= Religion of the Shang dynasty =

Early Chinese religious history

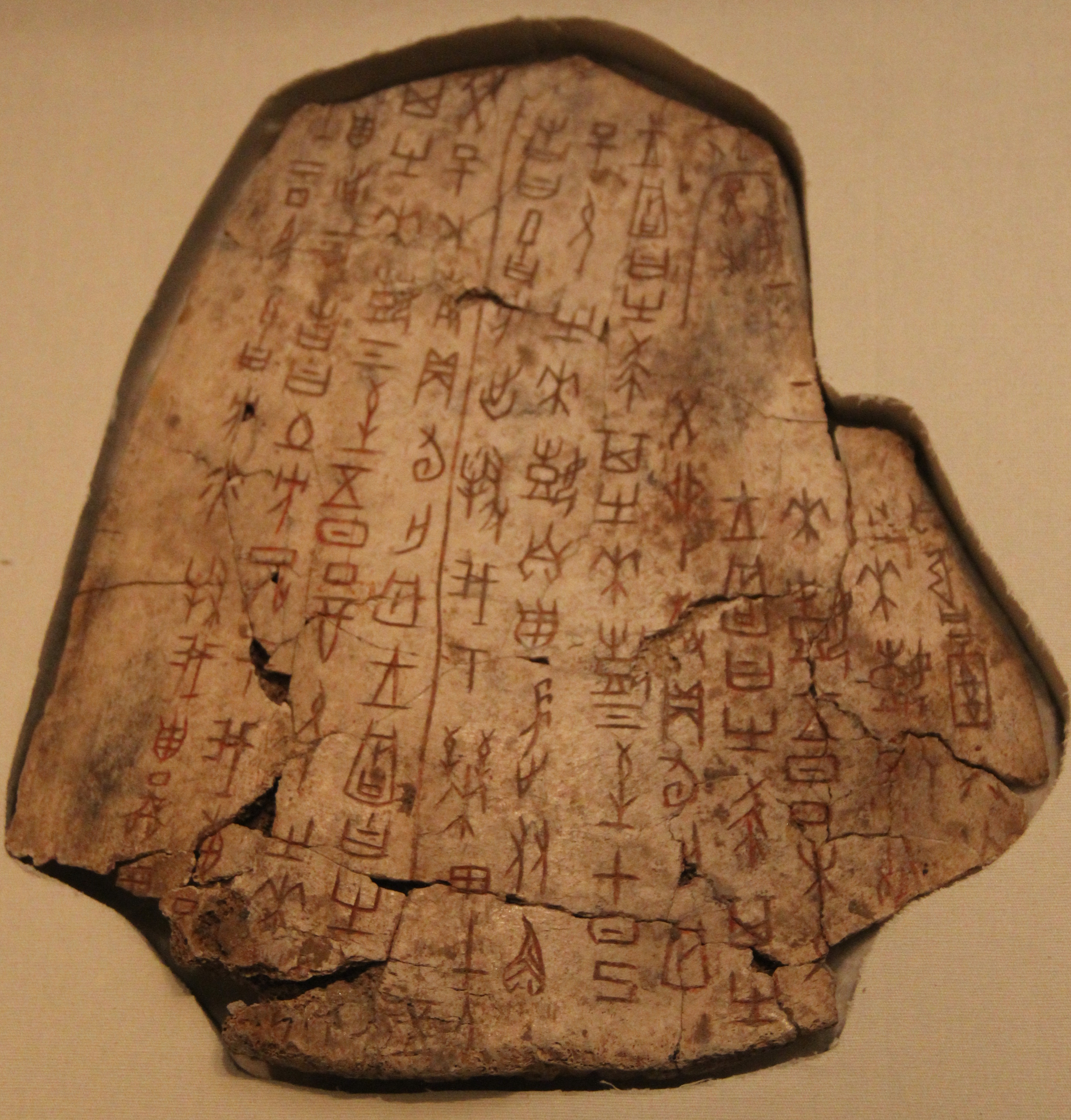
- A Shang oracle bone inscribed with the results of divination
- Type: Polytheism
- Theology: Ancestor deification; Animism; Shamanism
- Region: Yellow River valley
- Language: Old Chinese

The state religion of the Shang dynasty (c. 1600 – c. 1046 BC), the second royal dynasty of China, involved trained practitioners communicating with deities, including deceased ancestors and nature spirits. These deities formed a pantheon headed by the high god Di. Methods of communication with spirits included divinations written on oracle bones and sacrifice of living beings. Much of what is known about Shang religion has been discovered through archaeological work at Yinxu – the site of Yin, the Late Shang capital – as well as earlier sites. At Yinxu, inscriptions on oracle bones and ritual bronze vessels have been excavated. The earliest attested inscriptions were made c. 1250 BC, during the reign of king Wu Ding – though the attested script is fully mature, and is believed to have emerged centuries earlier.

Religion played an important role in Shang life and economy. Aside from divination and sacrifices, the Shang also practised burials, posthumous naming, and possibly shamanism, with facilitation from a diverse ritual culture. The royal adherents constantly worshipped the deities through those ceremonies, the scheduling of which was facilitated by Shang astronomers via the invention of a sophisticated calendar system based on a 60-day cycle. Regional estates maintained independent practitioners but worshipped the same deities for common purposes. Those acts of worship, which were formalised over time, were held for divine fortune along with prosperity of the late Shang state.

Originally derived from prehistoric Chinese religions, many aspects of the Shang religion first appeared during the Early Shang, developing gradually throughout the Middle and Late periods. After 1046 BC, the Zhou dynasty, which conquered the Shang, continued to assimilate elements of Shang religion into its own traditions. Elements of Shang beliefs and practices were integrated into later Chinese culture, with some even having legacies reflected in the traditions of countries within the Sinosphere. Various traditional texts of the Zhou and later Imperial dynasties make references to Shang beliefs and rituals, albeit with considerable differences from the actual religion.

== Definition ==
The spiritual system as practised by the Shang has been described as a religion, and some scholars – such as Robert Eno – characterise it more specifically as a state religion. The sinologist David Keightley defined the Shang tradition described in oracle bone inscriptions as "religiosity" instead of "religion", due to the limited scope of what these texts offer about Shang subjective experience with the spiritual aspect. This tradition has also been referred to as a royal cult, with an intimate relation to the power of the Shang king.

The Shang religion did not rely on any scriptures to narrate its faith. Modern scholarship instead understands it through oracle bone inscriptions which act as the main textual evidence, together with archaeological remains of ritual activities such as sacrifices. These sources mainly describe the religion in royal and elite contexts, but parts of the information they offer may have as well been concerned by the common people.

== Beliefs ==
There are disputes concerning whether Shang religious beliefs were bureaucratic or at least proto-bureaucratic, with sinologists such as Keightley supporting such theories while Eno rejects them. The Shang articulated a pantheon led by a supreme being and filled with deities of various origins, particularly ancestral and natural. Despite its diversity of spirits, Shang religion was dominated by ancestor worship, with core tenets of belief centred on relationships between the living and the dead.

=== High God Di ===
Shang Oracle bone script characters of the High God Di (帝)

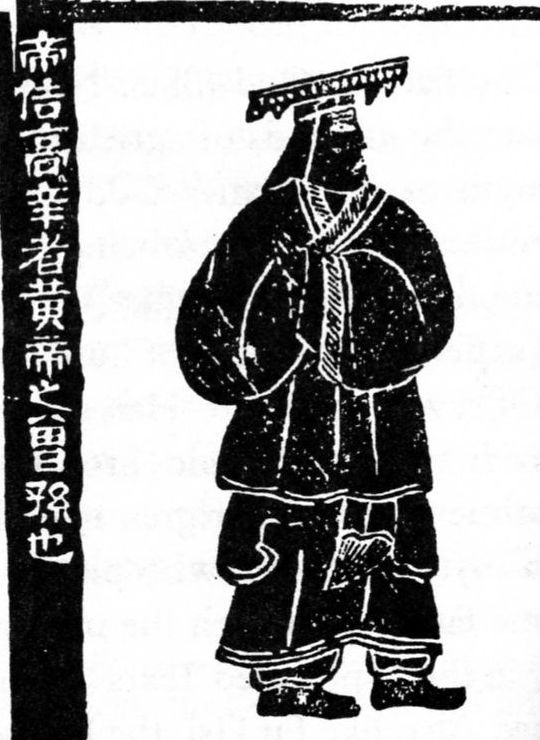
Emperor Ku, the third of the Five Emperors according to Sima Qian's history

The head of the Shang pantheon was Di (帝), the 'High God'. In many oracle bone inscriptions, Di is described as presiding over a hierarchy of spirits, including former humans and nature deities, of which all were under Di's control. The Shang sought to understand the will of this high deity through the practice of divination using oracle bones. (Note: Modern scholars studying Di often refer to the deity as Shangdi. The Shang conception of Di as a supreme god has been challenged by scholars including Zhu Fenghan, who argues instead that Di was a cosmic spirit. It is unknown whether Di is mentioned in Shang bronze inscriptions.)

The Shang believed that Di exercised authority over both the natural and human worlds, which included controlling the climate, influencing the harvest, and overseeing the outcomes of battles. Di expressed approval or disapproval over the everyday actions of humans, and was thought to be capable of either providing aid or sending down disasters. Di was virtually the only deity who could issue commands (令; lìng). While the Shang conducted rituals to ensure Di would not harm them, there is no evidence that they made sacrifices to Di as they did to other spirits, implying a significant distinction in how Di was perceived.

The identity of Di has been the subject of debate. Some scholars proposed that the Shang conceived of Di in a manner similar to the Judeo-Christian God. Another approach conflates Di with the legendary Emperor Ku, the third of the Five Emperors mentioned as preceding the Shang in Sima Qian's Shiji (c. 91 BC). Emperor Ku could be the same as Kui, a spirit addressed as "High Ancestor" in at least four Shang inscriptions. This might prove to be useful for the Shang king, who accordingly was seen as sharing portions of the High God's power.

Another view is that Shang religion did not conceive of a high god as such, and that Di was a generic word applicable to all divine powers. Eno advances four grounds: the absence of sacrifices to Di; inconsistent usage of the term, such as inscriptions where Di appears together with named royal ancestors; its apparent use as a plural; and its use as an honorific in naming the deceased father of a reigning king. He argues that di denoted not a single supreme deity, but whatever portion of the pantheon was being treated as its apex in the context of a given divination. While agreeing with Eno against the existence of a singular High God, John C. Didier differs from him in the nature of Di's multiplicity.

=== Nature spirits ===
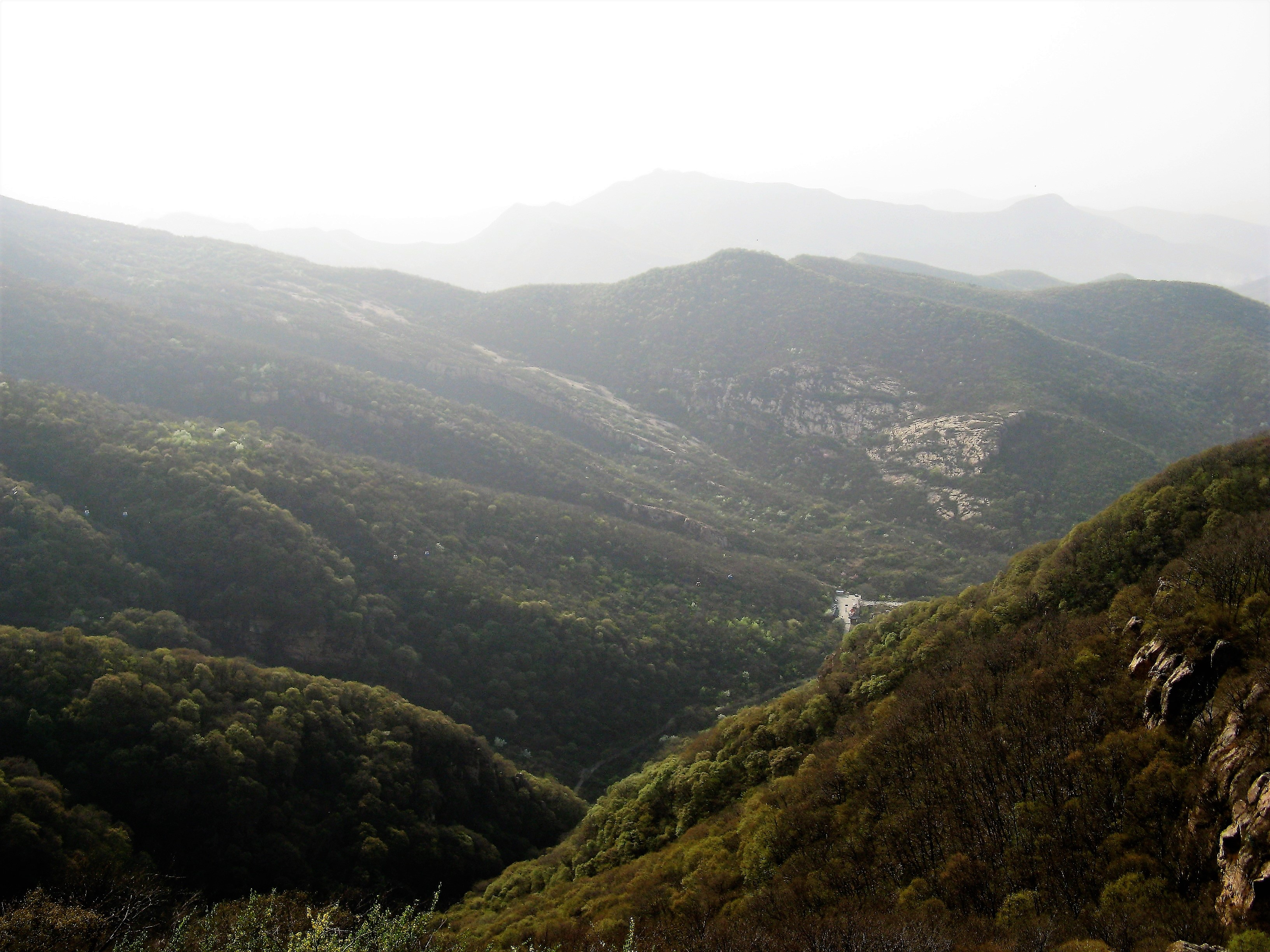
Mount Song in Henan, most likely associated with the Shang mountain god Yue

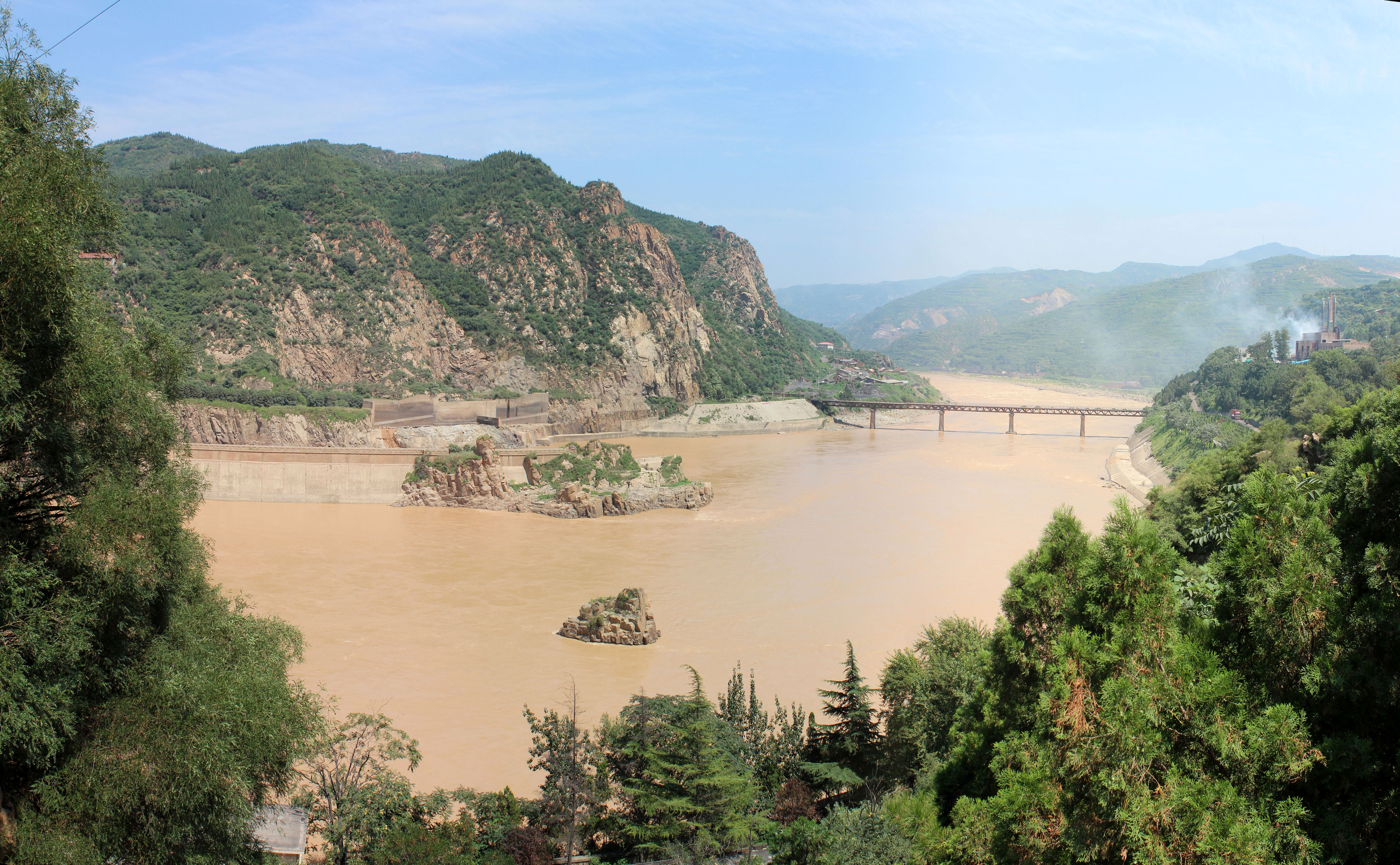
The Yellow River, worshipped by the Shang as the River Power He

Nature powers were typically addressed by the Shang only when the need for general blessings or assistance against natural calamities were urgent, and they seemed to have less influence than ancestor spirits. Among the nature spirits were wind gods, which were associated with the four cardinal directions and the four seasons. (Note: The Jiaguwen Heji 14294 inscription names the four winds and their corresponding directions: The eastern direction Xī (析) associated with the xié (劦) wind; The western direction Yí (彝) associated with the wēi (韋) wind; The southern direction Wéi (𡵂) associated with the yí (夷) wind; The northern direction Fú (伏) associated with the yì (伇) wind.) Winds also seemed to be associated with the phoenix, which is mentioned as Di's messenger. Rituals were conducted to appease the wind gods, and to pray for successful harvests. The wind itself appears as a deity, and there are other spirits that could control winds.

Some nature powers were responsible for crop failures, which were detrimental to the Shang whose economy was based on agriculture. Such spirits include the Mountain Power Yue (岳), which modern scholars identify as Mount Song, and the River Power He (河), a god representing the Yellow River. (Note: Some scholars, however, identify Yue instead as the spirit representing the Taihang Mountains to the west of the Shang capital.) Yue and He – which influenced state matters such as harvests and war – were the only nature spirits with clearly defined roles, and the Shang practice of treating them as ancestor-like deities was likely to allow them to exercise their authority together with ancestor spirits. Also recognised by the Shang, the Earth Power She (社) – or Tu (土) in Shang inscriptions – was associated with protection from misfortune, and potentially with the feminine.

Some inscriptions refer to gendered spirits such as the Mother of the West (西母; Xīmǔ) and Mother of the East (東母; Dōngmǔ) who respectively controlled sunset and sunrise. (Note: Shang inscriptions seem to indicate the worship of a third spirit, the Central Mother (中母; Zhōngmǔ), even though some interpret it to be ancestral.) Some identify these two spirits as goddesses of celestial objects, while others say that they were more likely earth deities with possible origins from agricultural and fertility cults.

Night and dreams were possibly associated with an owl deity, with references to owls found in Shang inscriptions and art. Dance and sacrifices acted as Shang prayers to the rains. The Sun was an independent deity to which the Shang prayed for harvests, although it did not usually receive rituals. Similarly, worship of the Moon is existent but rarely seen in Shang texts. Shang kings also worshipped the spirit of the Huan River, which served as a place where they conducted rituals. (Note: The river appears with the same name, Huan, on Shang inscriptions.) Oracle-texts mention a certain 'Shang River' and its own river spirit, whose name may be the origin of the dynastic name itself.

=== Ancestor spirits ===
Shang character for the high ancestor Shang Jia (上甲)

The Shang upheld beliefs in royal ancestor spirits, most of whom were former kings and queen consorts. (Note: It has been argued that the Shang ancestor cult was motivated by the notion that ancestor spirits would lead other spirits to act favourably towards the human realm – that is, to attempt to make the spirits controllable by humans.) The ancestor list grew through time, as the death of each reigning king added him as an ancestor. Six Predynastic ancestor deities were recognised:

1. Shang Jia (上甲)
2. Bao Yi (匚乙)
3. Bao Bing (匚丙)
4. Bao Ding (匚丁)
5. Shi Ren (示壬)
6. Shi Gui (示癸)

The Shang referred to these Predynastic ancestors as the 'Six Spirits' (六示; lìushì), with the junior five called the 'Lesser Spirits' (小示; xiǎoshì). The Shang dynastic line was recognised to begin with Shi Gui's child Da Yi – and ultimately ended with Di Xin, the final Shang king. (Note: Da Yi was the first traditional Shang king. In Shang inscriptions, his other names can be rendered as Chéng (成), Táng (唐) and Xián (咸) while in Shiji he is called Tāng (湯). The last two Shang kings' posthumous names were not found anywhere in the oracle bones due to the termination of Shang rule. They were conventionally referred to as Di Yi and Di Xin, which are anachronistic names.) All Shang kings whose both father and son also ruled as kings were grouped as mainline ancestors – a lineage anachronistically referred to as the dazong (大宗) – and formed the major subject of Shang ancestor worship, at the expense of collateral ancestors.

Shang ancestor worship possessed characteristics of an impersonalised cult, in which the spirits of dead royals were deprived of their individuality upon becoming ancestors. These spirits constituted what modern scholars describe as a "generational hierarchy", with the power of its members determined by seniority. Predynastic ancestors were the most powerful, with the power to influence weather and crops. In contrast, recently dead ancestors might only cause personal trouble, such as haunting the living king with nightmares. Ancestor spirits could intercede with the High God Di, and they could also inflict severe calamities if they were not appeased with the proper rituals.

The Shang to a certain degree revered female ancestor spirits, including the mothers and consorts of mainline kings – except for the wives of the first four Predynastic ancestors. Shang texts mention female ancestors causing the king's illness, and they occasionally refer to angry and unfriendly ancestresses who would thereafter receive offerings. However, female ancestors generally did not receive a similar level of reverence as male ancestors, being the focus of only one-sixth of Shang rituals, possibly due to the fact that their jurisdiction was seen as being limited to reproduction. Women attested in oracle bone inscriptions included Mu Ji (母己), Bi Bing (妣丙), and most prominently Fu Hao, the consort of Wu Ding, who was referred to as Mu Xin (母辛) and Bi Xin (妣辛) after her death.

=== Former Lords and other deities ===
Within the Shang pantheon there existed a group of ancestor-like spirits that were probably recognised by a general population outside of the royal clan, and it was also some of these spirits that later reappeared in traditional Chinese literature. The most prominent spirits in this group – which the Shang called the 'High Ancestors' (高祖; gāozǔ) but referred to by modern scholarship as the 'Former Lords' (先公; xiāngōng) – include Wang Hai (王亥) and Nao (獶, alternatively read as Kui or Jun). The powers of these two outranked those of the highest Shang ancestors, ranging from affecting the weather to influencing the king.

Also mentioned as Former Lords were Ji (季) and Wang Gen (王亙). This category also comprised spirits whom modern scholars identify as former Shang ministers with the postmortem ability to curse the living, such as Xue Wu, Xian Wu, Huang Yin, and Yi Yin; the latter was accompanied by a consort named Yi Shi, and was able to control rain and ensure good harvests. Also in the Shang pantheon was E (娥), whose categorisation status was unclear, and Mo Xi, who in later literature was mentioned as a consort of the last Xia dynasty ruler Jie.

=== Cosmology ===
Celestial pole in Shang–Zhou characters

The Shang character di (禘) features a rectangle projecting the stars Mizar, Thuban, Kochab, Alioth and Pherkad

The Zhou character for Tian (天) also features a rectangle at the top

Shang cosmology viewed the cosmos as being composed of the 'four directions' (四方; sìfāng), with the king being divinely sanctioned to rule at the 'Centre Shang' (中商; Zhōng Shāng). Shang deities – the High God Di, the nature spirits, and the ancestors – were connected together in this sifang universe, which served as an ordered medium through which Di interacted with humans. Events from the four directions were perceived as fulfillments of Di's will, making sifang cosmology a way for the Shang to understand Di and the universe.

Readings of Shang inscriptions led some scholars to attribute a possible cosmological identity to Di. Accordingly, the Shang believed in the divinity of the north celestial pole – the Shang's 'absolute centre' – and it was at the pole's surrounding square area that the High God was thought to dwell. Di was perceived to be composed of two components, with the upper one called Shangdi (上帝) and its lower counterpart named Xiadi (下帝). Either of these two was probably a collective manifestation of Shang ancestors, and Didier identifies it to be Shangdi, which he believes to have been the part of Di associated with the polar square.

Shang graphs for Di may have acted accordingly as projections of the celestial pole, the stars surrounding it, and Di's heavenly divinity. The square component within those characters possibly denoted even the sifang itself. The square also appears as an independent character in Shang inscriptions (口), representing the fourth Heavenly Stem ding and signifying various ritual meanings. (Note: There is another common variation on the square graph found in inscriptions.)

Phenomena within the Shang cosmos were conceived as both positive and negative counterparts, with a worldview variously described as dualistic, complementary, shamanistic, and correlative. It was through this complementarity of the optimistic and the pessimistic that the Shang attempted to influence the spirits.

A small group of inscriptions refers to the "Five Adjutants" or "Five Ministers" (五臣; wǔchén) of Di, which Didier interprets as subordinate spirits transmitting Di's messages to the human world, possibly associated with the five classical planets. Eno regards the evidence as too slight to establish a divine bureaucracy, noting that the phrase is attested on only a handful of bone fragments, of which two are ambiguous.

=== Totemism ===
Textual evidence seems to indicate that the Shang believed in bird totemism – the practice of associating kinship between humans and birds. Most academics identify the Shang bird totem with the Xuanniao (玄鳥), a divine bird mentioned in later Zhou accounts as giving birth to the Shang high ancestor Xie, and some take this as an indication that the Shang considered themselves descendants of birds. However, most evidence indicates that the Shang likely worshipped general bird features rather than a particular species. It is also possible that these names represented beasts instead of birds.

Sarah Allan contends that the Shang may also have forged a totemic identification of their highest ancestors with the ten suns which in turn were associated with birds, and that this belief might be one of the primary basis for the late Shang ritual calendar. Although Shang inscriptions do not directly mention the ten suns, which appeared as a myth discussed in Zhou and Han literature, Allan suggests that this totemic tradition was implied by many later texts. Aside from birds, tigers and dragons depicted on Shang bronzes have been interpreted as totems.

== Acts of worship ==
The inscriptional term feng (豊) represented the Shang abstract concept of ritual, which Keightley described as a "scientific" method by which the Shang attempted to prosper all aspects of life. Through rituals, the king was able to communicate directly with his most recent ancestors by offering sacrifices, and these ancestors could themselves provide access to more senior spirits – who in turn passed the king's requests to Di. Over 50 separate rituals have been identified in oracle bone inscriptions, with probably even more undocumented ones that may render modern understandings inadequate.

=== Sexagenary calendar ===
Shang rituals followed a sexagenary, or 60-day, calendrical cycle derived from 10- and 12-day subcycles. A Shang week consists of ten days corresponding with the 10-cycle signs – later known as the Heavenly Stems – with the order starting with jia (甲), then yi (乙), bing (丙), ding (丁), wu (戊), ji (己), geng (庚), xin (辛), ren (壬), and gui (癸). (Note: The concept of a seven-day week possibly reached China during the reign of Zu Jia (12th century BC), although it was never adopted by the Shang.) The 12-cycle – later called the Earthly Branches – comprises zi (子), chou (丑), yin (寅), mao (卯), chen (辰), si (巳), wu (午), wei (未), shen (申), you (酉), xu (戌), ending with hai (亥). A 10-cycle sign could combine with a 12-cycle sign to form a sexagenary name for a day. This early Chinese calendar was featured in various major Shang religious practices, especially those dedicated to ancestors.

=== Divination ===
Scapula inscribed by Zheng during the reign of Wu Ding – Yinxu Museum, Anyang

癸丑王卜貞：
On the day guichou, the king made cracks and divined:

旬亡禍。
"In the next ten days there will be no disasters."

王固曰吉。
The king read the cracks and said: "Auspicious".

— Divination during the reigns of Di Yi and Di Xin

The Shang practised pyromancy – a form of divination using fire – to communicate indirectly with spirits. Although major Shang periods all featured pyromancy with oracle bones, literate divination only appeared during the Late Shang (c. 1250 – 1050 BC) when about one-tenth of the corpus was with inscriptions. The oldest divinatory inscriptions have been dated to c. 1250 BC, although the script itself possibly traces its origin back to considerably earlier periods. (Note: Twenty-six oracle bones from the era of Wu Ding have been dated to 1254 – 1197 BC, with the oldest dated to 1254 – 1221 BC within a confidence level of 80–90%.) Shang inscriptions also seemingly imply engagement with divination using polygrams.

Shang divination typically took place in temples, but also could be conducted outside of ritual centres. Oracle bones primarily included scapulae or turtle plastrons, to which the staff applied heat after cleaning and preparing. (Note: Excavators of the Yinxu site were informed of pens which might be used by the Shang to keep turtles, the source for their shells.) Bone cracks produced during the process were seen as messages from the spirits, and scribes then wrote the interpretation on the bones. After a divination ritual, the used oracle bones were stripped of their divine qualities, and were subsequently buried in pits.

Typically, a full inscription includes a preface – which records the date and place of divination together with the diviner's name – accompanied by a charge that outlines the concerned topic, the king's prognostication, and a verification recording the actual outcome. (Note: The prognostication and verification are very rare in Shang inscriptions. Most often, the decision to include verification in divinations indicate that the subject divined was of crucial importance to the socio-political situation of the Shang state. Similarly, prognostications are seldom found in inscriptions; for example, only 1.2% of the Bin-group divinations contain this part. Some inscriptions also contain crack notations and crack numbers.) Many divinations follow a formula of positive and negative charges accompanying each other, reflecting the Shang dualistic theology of complementarity. It is common for multiple numbers of the same divination to appear on a single bone, in which case the date records help establish their sequence.

Shang divinations were conducted not to forecast the future, but to ensure that present actions would not result in catastrophes. Topics commonly covered in Shang divinations include warfare, hunting, agriculture, well-being, sacrifices, and weather. (Note: Many divinations were 'divining for the week ahead' (卜旬; bǔ xún), in which diviners would predict events for the next ten-day week after the said ritual.) For example, there are certain divinations about outside attacks, although none of them appeared during Yinxu Period V when the Shang had established control over a small, stable area. Additionally, divinations were carried out to determine suitable policies for public works and royal commissions, such as walling cities and mobilising people.

It has been recognised that some divinations were not made on the king's behalf, but by the aristocratic elite. Scholars identify multiple groups of these so-called 'non-king divinations' which mostly date to the early and middle periods of Wu Ding's reign. One such group comprises over 500 inscriptions excavated at the Huayuanzhuang East site that were originally commissioned by a Shang prince, (Note: The Prince of Huayuanzhuang was probably a son of Wu Ding, indicated in seven different oracle bones, though it is uncertain whether he was born by Fu Hao. Inscriptions of his own indicate that Wu Ding and Fu Hao were both in a close relationship with the patron, which supports this position. Besides, modern studies have identified that he worshipped Wu Ding's father Xiao Yi and his wife, addressing them as grandfather or grandmother.) and reflects a distinct writing style from that of the royal divinations.

Aside from the royal and noble traditions, some academics identify a third type of divination that served public needs. These divinations were conducted with less careful preparation; they do not feature inscriptions, either, suggesting that literate divination was restricted to a small group of royals and elites purportedly connected to the spirits. However, some divinations identified as public may have, in reality, belonged to the royal tradition.

=== Liturgical sacrifices ===
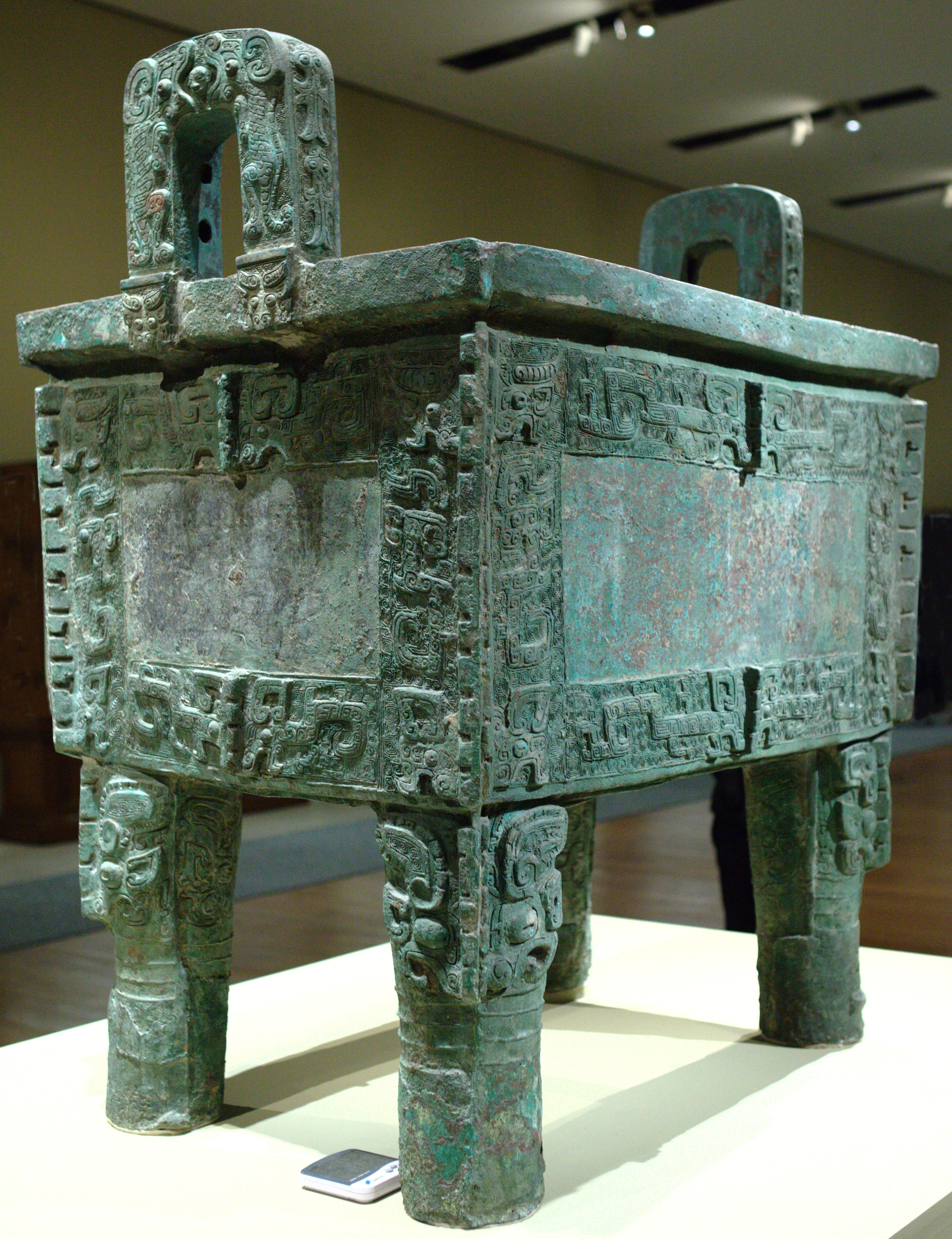
The Houmuwu ding, dimensions 133 cm × 110 cm × 79.2 cm (52.4 in × 43.3 in × 31.2 in), commissioned by Zu Geng to commemorate his deceased mother – National Museum of China, Beijing

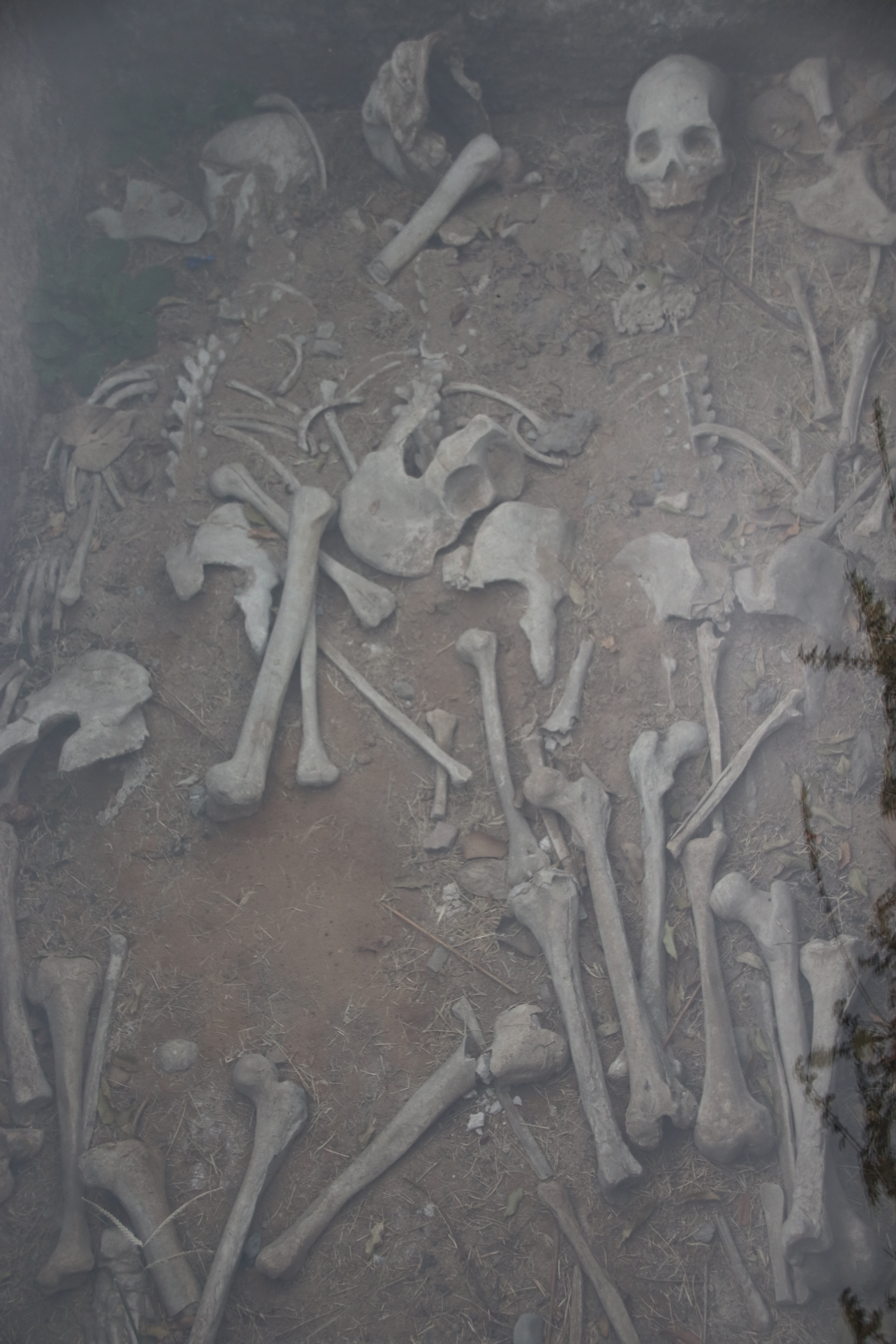
Reconstruction of a sacrificial pit filled with human skeletons

The Shang regularly conducted sacrifices to please the spirits and pray for their blessings, with a certain degree of ritual violence. Characteristic of the practice were "bureaucratic" ancestral sacrifices, in which each desired outcome was regarded as falling within the jurisdiction of particular royal ancestors, who in turn required a unique sacrificial package. Sacrifices to royal ancestors was a crucial obligation of the king, who by the 11th century BC had to perform such rituals every day. The demand for sacrificial materials spurred technological innovations for Shang society.

Non-living sacrificial offerings were mainly bones, stones, and bronzes. Bones came as hairpins or arrowheads, or as ivory in elite tombs. Jade ritual objects have been discovered in the Tomb of Fu Hao. Bronzes were offered as vessels with short inscriptions, such as the ding (鼎), of which access seemed to be exclusively granted to the king and heirs partaking in rituals. The Shang also utilised ceramics with inherited designs from earlier cultures.

Animals constituted an important source of offering to the royal ancestors and nature spirits. Faunal offerings were subjected to certain colour principles and, in funerary contexts, rules of completeness and location. Predominant sacrificial animals included pigs, which featured heavily in Early Shang (Erligang) contexts, and horses, the most commonly sacrificed during the Late period. Canine sacrifice was practised flexibly with dogs expected to be food or postmortem attendants for ancestors. Others include sheep and cattle, which were sacrificed to both the ancestors and nature powers. The Shang also sacrificed millet, ale, and grains alongside the animals.

The Shang practised large-scale human sacrifice, a practice deriving from their belief in the afterlife. At least 14,197 human victims were mentioned in inscriptions, although 1,145 inscriptions do not mention exact figures. Victims were often enemy prisoners, such as the Qiang (羌) who were either captured or sent as gifts by the Shang's neighbours. While some prisoners were spared, many, including women, were sacrificed. A single ritual sacrifice could involve hundreds or thousands of victims. Different recipients seemed to require different killing methods; for example, victims were drowned for sacrifices to the River Power, buried alive for the Earth Power, cut into pieces for the wind spirits, and burned to death for sky spirits.

==== Sacrificial names ====
The oracle bone inscriptions contain a rich sacrificial vocabulary. Numerous terms distinguished victims of sacrifice, such as 'females' (女; nǚ), 'dependent women' (妻; qī), and 'servants' (妾; qiè), and 'minor servants' (小臣; xiǎochén), indicating that the Shang even sacrificed minor officers.

Shang texts refer to methods of sacrifice, including dou (豆), the killing of humans in bronze vessels, shan (刪) denoting single human sacrifice, or shi (氏) referring to ritualised offering at temples. Distinct terms including liao (燎; lit. 'burning'), mao (卯; lit. 'splitting'), chen (沉; lit. 'drowning'), and da yu (大禦; lit. 'great exorcism') all fall into the group of exorcist sacrifices conducted to counteract negative forces. Particularly, the term yong (用) continued to be used in classical texts as yongren (用人), referring to human sacrifice.

==== Cycle of sacrifice ====
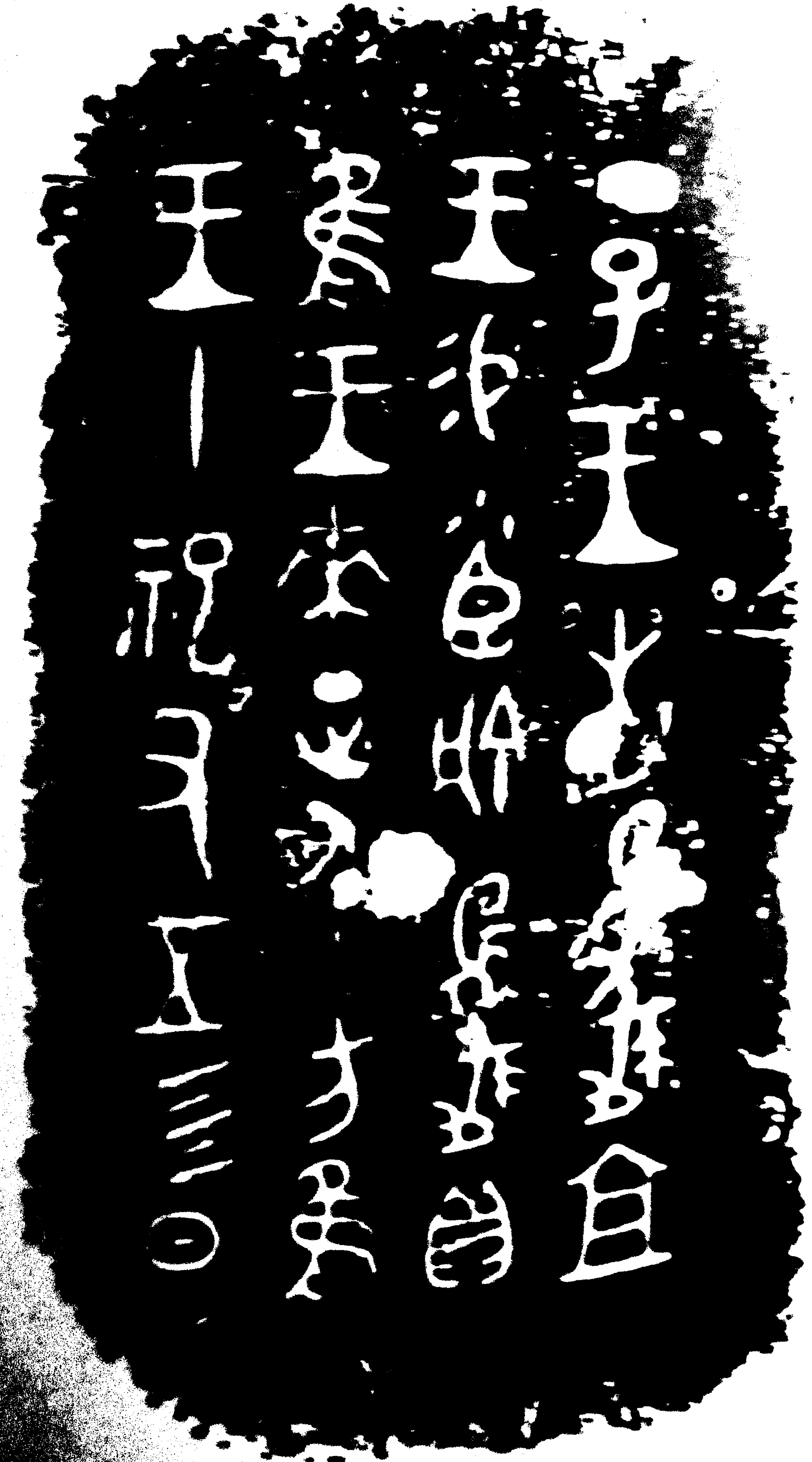
Rubbing of the four columns of the inscription on the Xiao Chen Yu zun

Late Shang ritual featured a liturgical cycle of regular sacrifices, with the recipients comprising ancestral kings and ancestress associated with mainline kings. This cycle consisted of five consecutive sacrificial rituals: ji (祭), zai (洅), xie (劦), yong (肜), and yi (翌). Each ancestor received only one of the five rituals at one time. At the beginning of each sacrificial round, a ceremony honouring all recipients called gongdian was held, and in every weekend, priests would make an inscription announcing the sacrifices for the next day. The basic sequence started with yi and ended with yong, although some believe that ji was the opening round.

The five sacrifices constituted alternating 36- and 37-week cycles, with only one "rest week" for preparations of the next cycle. Since a Shang week is 10 days, a full cycle approximated a solar year, and was sometimes used as a term for a year itself. This calendar terminology was occasionally employed in more secular contexts, as in this excerpt from a bronze inscription:

隹王來征人方；
It was when the king returned from marching to regulate the Renfang;

隹王十祀又五肜日
It was the king's fifteenth ritual cycle, (the time of) the yong-day rituals.

— Xiao Chen Yu zun

Shang kings sometimes conducted additional, irregular sacrifices to ancestors who caused them misfortune. Supplemental rituals, such as wine offerings, were occasionally conducted the night before the commencement of one among the five cyclical ceremonies. Due to the fall of the Shang, the last two kings did not receive sacrifices.

=== Shamanism ===
Oracle bone script character denoting wu

Inscriptions attest to Shang spiritual communication rituals, namely yi (異), described as a process of spiritual metamorphism and empowerment, and bin (賓) which involved the king hosting Di or one of his ancestors. Such rituals have sparked disputes regarding possible shamanic traits, with Kwang-chih Chang identifying it as shamanism espoused by the king, while David Keightley scrutinised it – citing a lack of evidence for ecstasy or in-body commingling.

Shang inscriptions refer to figures commonly rendered as the wu (巫). While the role of wu in Shang religion is not fully understood, they seemed to make use of prayer and astrology to mediate between humans and spirits. Multiple textual readings disagree on whether the wu were worshipped after death alongside other Shang spirits. It is uncertain whether the wu of the Shang were shamans per se, or if they used other means to communicate with spirits. Evidence suggests that non-Shang peoples could reasonably serve as wu; the sinologist Victor H. Mair supported the view that the occupation was indirectly connected to that of the Zoroastrian magus, who engaged in spiritual communications without shamanic trance or mediation. (Note: Mair identifies the Old Chinese pronunciation of wu as m^{y}ag, with regards to phonetic transcriptions from Bernhard Karlgren, Zhou Fagao, Li Fang-kuei, and Axel Schuessler.) David Keightley also disagreed with an identification of wu with shamans.

More recent investigation has demonstrated a lack of convincing evidence for shamanism in the Shang religion. As such, the arguments of Chang et al. for a shamanic theory ultimately relied on data from later Zhou religious practice that was being conflated with that of Shang. Furthermore, their theory seemingly did not account for the methods by which the Shang perpetuated their rule – i.e. discerning the High God, a figure that they left unaddressed.

=== Funerary practices ===
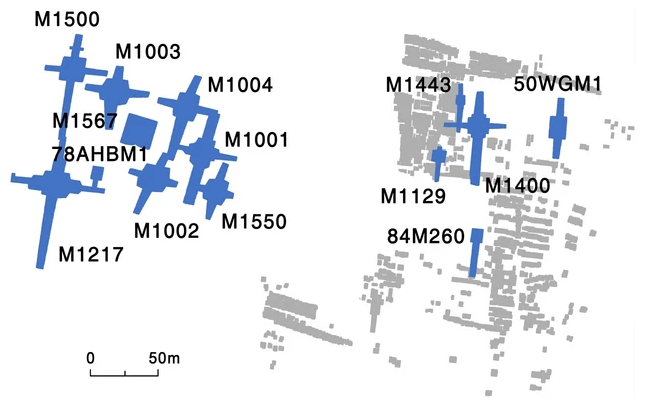
Map of the Xibeigang cemetery, with royal tombs in blue

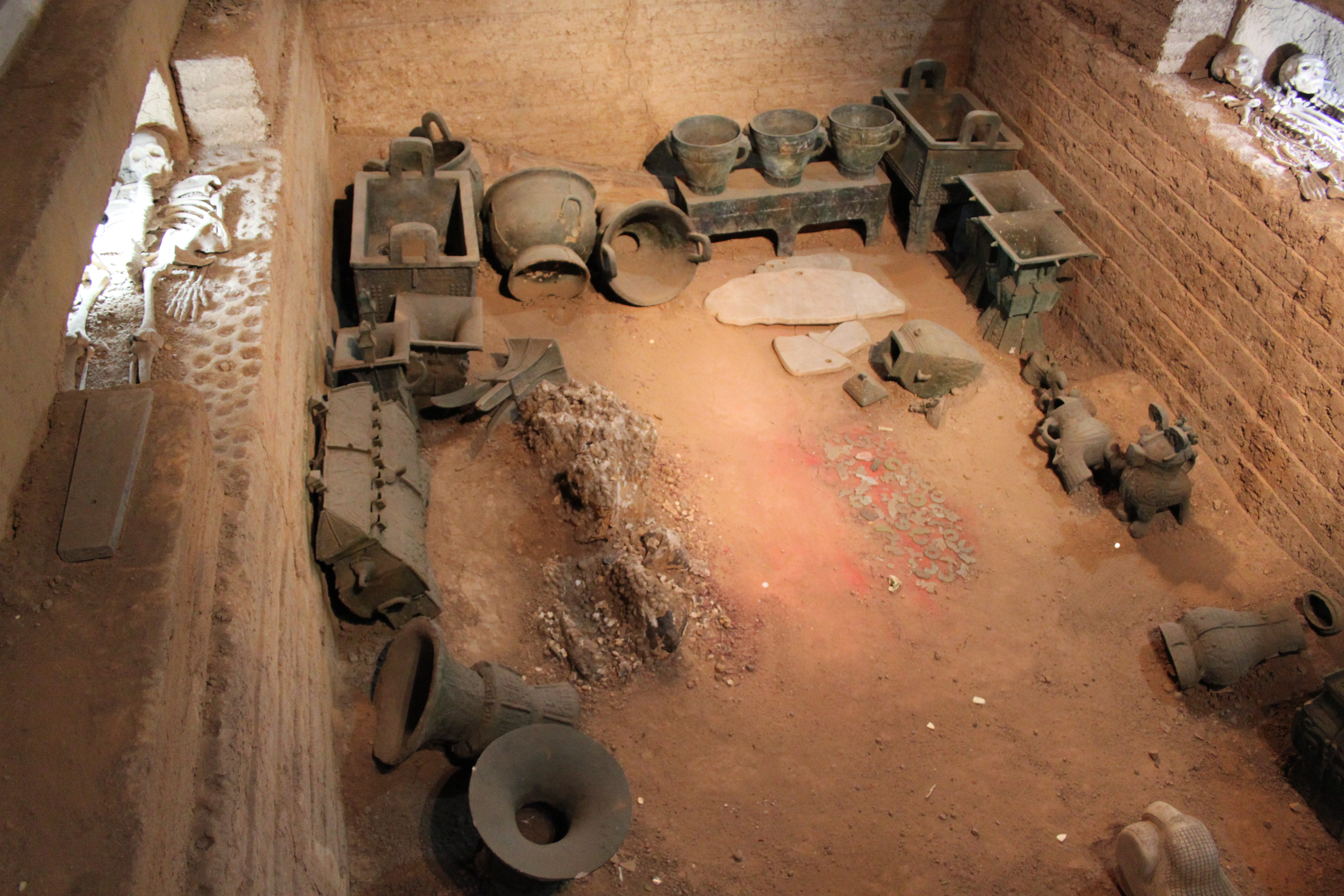
The Tomb of Fu Hao, dedicated to the principal queen of the Shang dynasty during the 13th century BC, enriched with artifacts and human sacrifice

Royal tombs of the Early Shang have not been discovered. Most Early-period burials were small, scattered graves, with less complexity and elaboration than those of later phases. During the Late Shang, a royal cemetery emerged at Xibeigang, located in the northern area of the capital. The cemetery was designed according to Shang cosmology, and was split into two zones for political purposes. Xibeigang houses nine tombs of kings, with seven in its western zone, but did not house Fu Hao's tomb which was situated within the palace complex. Over time, Xibeigang tombs have been looted of most of their contents, hindering the identification of the nine tombs with particular kings.

In a royal funeral, the king's tomb could be constructed before or after his death, while his coffin and furnishings were prepared elsewhere. The king, in his coffin, would be buried in a supine position within a wooden chamber in the central shaft. The chamber was then sealed, and the tomb refilled with earth as additional rituals were performed. Also found in Shang contexts are numerous smaller tombs for the political elites, and there is even a family grave of a diviner. The orientation of the dead in both capital and local settlements remained consistent throughout the Early to Late phases, being a deviation of 10 to 20 degrees northeast.

Early Shang grave goods include bronze items and ceramics, although many burials of this period feature neither of them. In Late-period contexts, the Shang enriched royal tombs with animals, human death attendants, and bronze items such as vessels and weapons, all to accompany the king in his afterlife. Elite tombs feature ceramics, bronzes, farming tools, but usually not coffins – especially if the tomb owners were low-ranked. Weapons were included in graves of both the Early and Late periods, suggesting the existence of a warrior class and their military ethos.

After funerals, relatives of the deceased usually engaged in mortuary feasting at their gravesides, presumably to transform the deceased into new ancestral spirits. Remains of shrines and possibly an offering hall have been found at Xibeigang, indicating that the site was used for rituals – even for ancestors not buried there.

More than 1,200 burials of sacrificial humans have been excavated at the Xibeigang cemetery, with particular concentration around a certain royal tomb. Unlike royal burials, the interment of these victims were oriented east–west, and there are some individuals without heads. It was once thought that they were victims killed during royal funerals, but more recent archaeology suggests that they were sacrificed after such ceremonies.

=== Posthumous naming ===
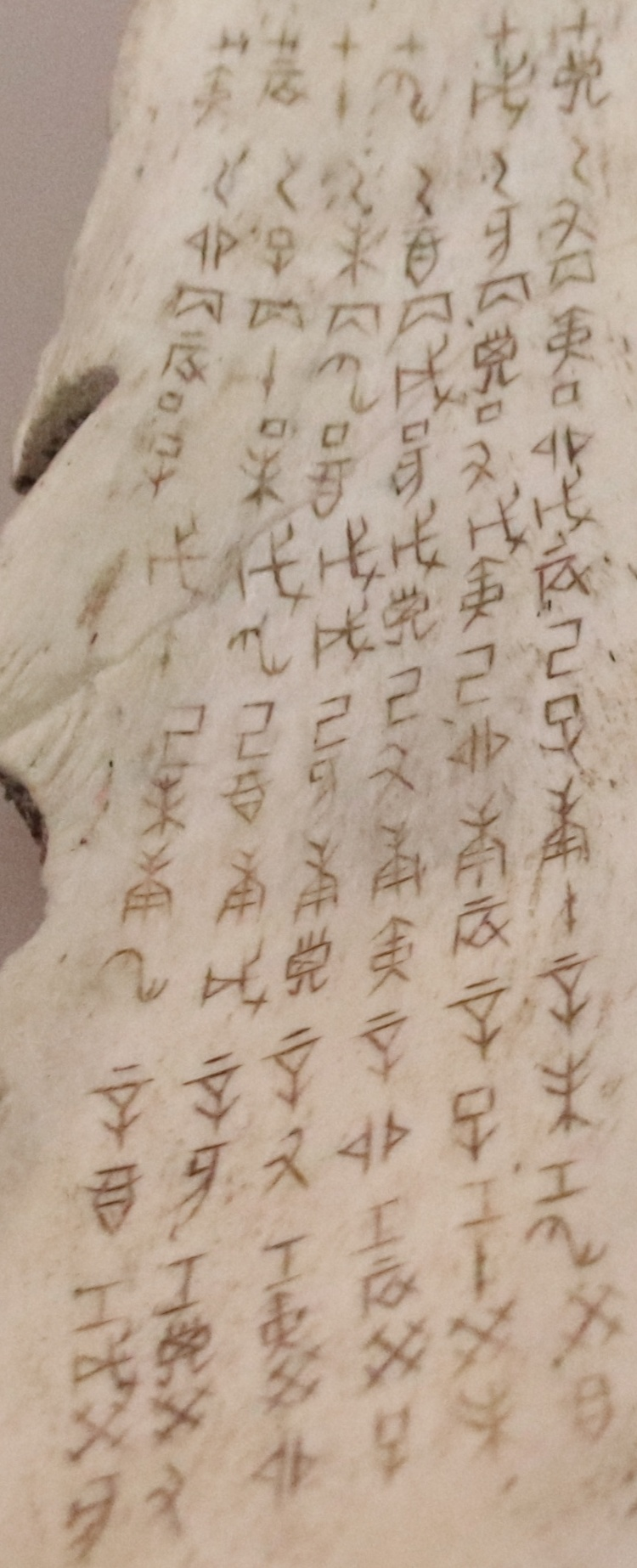
Table of Heavenly Stems from the reigns of the last two Shang kings, inscribed on a scapula

The Shang ascribed to each ancestor spirit a posthumous name that contains one of the 10-cycle Heavenly Stems. The sole exception to this convention is Wang Hai (王亥), the ancestor-like Former Lord whose name instead incorporates the twelfth Earthly Branch instead of one of the ten Stems. It seems that the ritualised process of assigning day-names to the dead involved divination, which would allow deterministic elements as well as human manipulation. Explanations have been given as to why the calendar was used for naming ancestors, but none is supported by direct evidence.

The American sinologist David Nivison has speculated about seemingly inherent patterns in the naming tradition, such as naming after first day of inaugural year, restraint from naming gui for dynastic kings, and avoiding the same name as the previous king. The Shang seemed to have a naming bias toward three stems – yi, ding, and jia – when naming male ascendants, and xin, ren, and gui when naming ancestresses. The stem-name of an ancestral spirit tended to dictate his or her day of receiving sacrifices – for example: out of 90 dates taken from a sample, Zu Yi received sacrifices on the yi day 53 times.

Posthumous names of some kings might be related to Shang cosmology, especially names with stems jia, ding and yi, which were probably projections of the celestial square. As such, the spirits referred to by these stem-names became perceived as powerful gods whose will significantly affected the living realm.

As there were more spirits than stems, the Shang added epithet-like prefixes to their names. Some prefixes indicate the specific familial relationship between the addressed ancestor and the reigning ruler; the characters are often used for a much broader range of meanings than their modern equivalents:

1. Relatives senior to the reigning king by two or more generations were referred to as zu (祖; 'grandfather', 'great uncle') and bi (妣; 'grandmother', 'great aunt').
2. Relatives of the generation prior to the reigning king were referred to as fu (父; 'father', 'uncle') and mu (母; 'mother', 'aunt'). For example, the sons of the then-ancestor Wu Ding referred to him as 'Father Ding' (父丁; Fù Dīng). Reigning kings sometimes replaced fu with di (帝), the name of the High God, to refer to their deceased fathers.
3. For relatives of the same generation, only the graph for males has been attested, which is xiong (兄; 'older brother', 'cousin').
4. Spouses of the reigning king were referred to as fu (婦).
5. Sons and nephews of the reigning king were referred to as zi (子). Some interpret this word as the royal surname, while others interpret it as a designation of the eldest son who led a family. It can be also be translated as 'lord'.

Other prefixes applied to Shang names include Da (大; 'greater') and Xiao (小; 'smaller'), which were used to differentiate mainline and collateral spirits sharing the same stem-name, and there are three kings – Jian Jia, Qiang Jia and Yang Jia – whose prefixes are of uncertain meaning. Since ancestors' posthumous names varied with their generational relationship with the worshipper, some ancestors received multiple posthumous names. The Former Lords such as Yi Yin seemed to possess implicit posthumous names not reflected by their appellations in Shang inscriptions.

=== Pilgrimage ===
The Shang may have engaged in pilgrimage, with the most likely destinations located in Chifeng (Inner Mongolia), Hanzhong (Shaanxi), Sichuan, and along the middle Yangtze River. Hoards of ritual paraphernalia found in those sites suggest that they were consecrated places, where Shang pilgrims made sacrifices and conducted ritual gatherings with local cultures' representatives. Those destinations served to ritually connect the Shang and other polities, with each possibly making their claim to religious association with certain pilgrimage sites.

== Distribution ==
By the Late period, Shang religion had been widespread among the general population. Rituals constituted a feature that Shang kings shared with the various lineage-based communities with scattered residence outside of their royal centre. The royal cult, however, stood out due to its massive expenditure of resources unseen in other Shang traditions. The Shang considered peoples who did not practice their religion to be alien, going possibly as far as being non-human.

=== Ritual centres ===
Early Shang ritual centres at Zhengzhou and Yanshi were subject to heavy ritualisation. Shortly before the abandonment of Zhengzhou, its ruling class probably sponsored considerable rituals in attempts to keep the settlement habitable. Shang rulers then turned to a short-lived ritual centre at the modern site of Xiaoshuangqiao (20 km northwest of Zhengzhou), most of whose ritual remains were looted after its own demise. The emergence of literacy at the last capital Yin (in modern Anyang), which the Shang called the 'Great Settlement Shang' (大邑商; Dàyì Shāng), came with first-time textual mentions of religious leaders, including the king, who acted as a "thearch", together with royals such as princes and queen consorts, who accompanied the king in divination and sacrifices.

Specialised diviners already existed at Zhengzhou, while about 120 diviners from the last capital city are known. Late Shang inscriptions also name other specialist groups serving the king, such as the scribes (史; shǐ), liturgists (祝; zhù), and the wu. Some of these groups appear to have gone through institutionalised ritual education (學; xué) before their official employment, despite debates on the nature of this education. These specialists were organised in a manner suggestive of an incipient bureaucracy, and it seems as well that they played a central role in the Shang government. Sacrificial rituals also featured commoners, who participated in these activities as part of their service to Shang kings.

=== Attested lineage practices ===
The core area of the Late Shang state comprised regions in and around the capital Yin administered by members of the various royal lineages, with the nature and extent of Shang control over further lands being difficult to fully discern and varying over time. (Note: The late Shang was in its early development as an authority-based state rising from chiefdoms. The state was made up of territories administered by the royal family and non-Shang leaders who were related to the king by marriage or supremacy recognition.) These elites rarely worshipped the predynastic and nature powers, and they also never divined about the High God Di. Each of the Shang lineages, however, was equipped with its own ritual staff, similar to the king.

An example among such traditions was that of the Wu Ding-era princely lineage associated with the Huayuanzhuang oracle bones, who appears to have administered a conquered region called Rong (戎). (Note: Rong has been variously located using Late Shang inscriptional references as well as later Eastern Zhou (771 – 256 BC) description. Evidence indicates that this land was most likely located along modern Henan's border, either with Shandong or Shanxi. Wu Ding established rule over Rong by issuing commands to its prince, assigning a royal officer to his estate, and being the one to whom the prince reported.) Huayuanzhuang inscriptions attest to the lineage worship of the same ancestors seen in royal texts, on whom this lineage conferred the same posthumous stem-name as the royal tradition but with their own prefixes. The patron of these inscriptions ordered the construction of temples in Rong, conducted sacrifices, and authorised accomplices to participate in common rituals. This prince acted as a diviner, with recurring topics including the construction of temples, relations with Wu Ding and the royal family, and matters of war. Wu Ding was mentioned as supplying the estate with sacrificial materials.

Royal leaders stationed along the western frontier worshipped more distant members of the mainline ancestral pantheon. Shang inscriptions also refer to Zi (子), a lineage territory sometimes sanctioned to perform sacrifices, and Lu (鹿), a royal land near the capital which the Huayuanzhuang prince used as a sacrificial place. Even the leader of the Gu – textually mentioned as a non-Shang lineage polity whose status fluctuated between enemy and ally – could perform sacrifices to Shang deities.

=== Predynastic Zhou homeland ===
The embrace of Shang religion spread to the area of Zhouyuan (周源) in the Guanzhong Basin, home to the Predynastic Zhou which existed as a Shang ally but eventually conquered the Shang to establish the Zhou dynasty. Hundreds of inscribed oracle bones have been unearthed in Zhouyuan – mostly produced during the reigns of the last two Shang kings (c. 1100 – c. 1046 BC), albeit with the inscriptions being of a distinct form and calligraphic style. These writings mention Zhou worship of Shang royal ancestors, especially the kings nearest to their time. For example, one fully surviving Zhouyuan oracle bone inscription reads:

Cracking on guisi day [the day of] performance of an yi-rite at the shrine of Wenwu Di-yi [Di Yi]; divining about whether the king, by performing a shao sacrifice to Cheng Tang [Da Yi] by means of an exorcism by cauldron using two female captive victims, and libation of the blood of three rams and three pigs, will in this way be correct.

— H11.1, Zhouyuan oracle bone corpus

The Predynastic Zhou ritual leader recorded in this inscription is assumed to be King Wen (文王; Wénwáng), who appears to have maintained shrines for Shang ancestors, and who was himself traditionally regarded as the son-in-law of the penultimate Shang king Di Yi. Modern scholarship still disagree about the nature of the Zhouyuan inscriptions. Some scholars suspect that the Zhouyuan bones were actually produced by the Shang people, despite excavations of several bones that confirm their Predynastic Zhou origins.

=== Other archaeological sites ===
Remains of Shang ritual are found at the sites of Panlongcheng and Daxinzhuang (located about 500 km (310 mi) away from Zhengzhou), probably pre-literate Shang military outposts that maintained strong ties to Zhengzhou. Daxinzhuang later featured traces of Late Shang ritual literacy, with excavated oracle bone inscriptions that exhibit both local variations and direct influence from royal practices. Readings of these inscriptions indicate preservations of the royal tradition in Daxinzhuang, albeit without specialised diviners. Also at Zhengzhou during the Late period, four pieces of oracle bone were discovered with short inscriptions possibly dating to the reign of Wu Ding.

Non-elite burials outside of the Late Shang capital area often lacked grave goods. The Subutun site (modern Shandong) features a four-ramped tomb which was the only one of that type discovered outside the capital, and may have housed either a local rival or a favourite of the Shang king. Another burial site at Tianhu (in Henan province) features a mix of Late Shang and indigenous elements, and served as the cemetery of a Shang lineage related to a consort of Wu Ding. The details of non-royal sacrificial practice are unclear due to rare inscriptional mentions. Human sacrifice of the Shang style have been identified at Qiuwan (modern Jiangsu), which Shang inscriptions refer to as Dapeng.

At the Shang village of Guandimiao (occupied c. 1250 – c. 1100 BC, in modern Xingyang, Henan), burials closely following the layout of Yinxu elite tombs have been excavated. Guandimiao features considerable ritual remains, including uninscribed oracle bones with similarities to the uninscribed corpus found at Yinxu; their use probably involved the participation of a local diviner. These remains are suggestive of Guandimiao's rich ritual life, which has challenged the modern assumption that Shang elites ruled with a religious monopoly.

== Arts and culture ==
=== Ritual art ===
Taotie on ritual bronzes

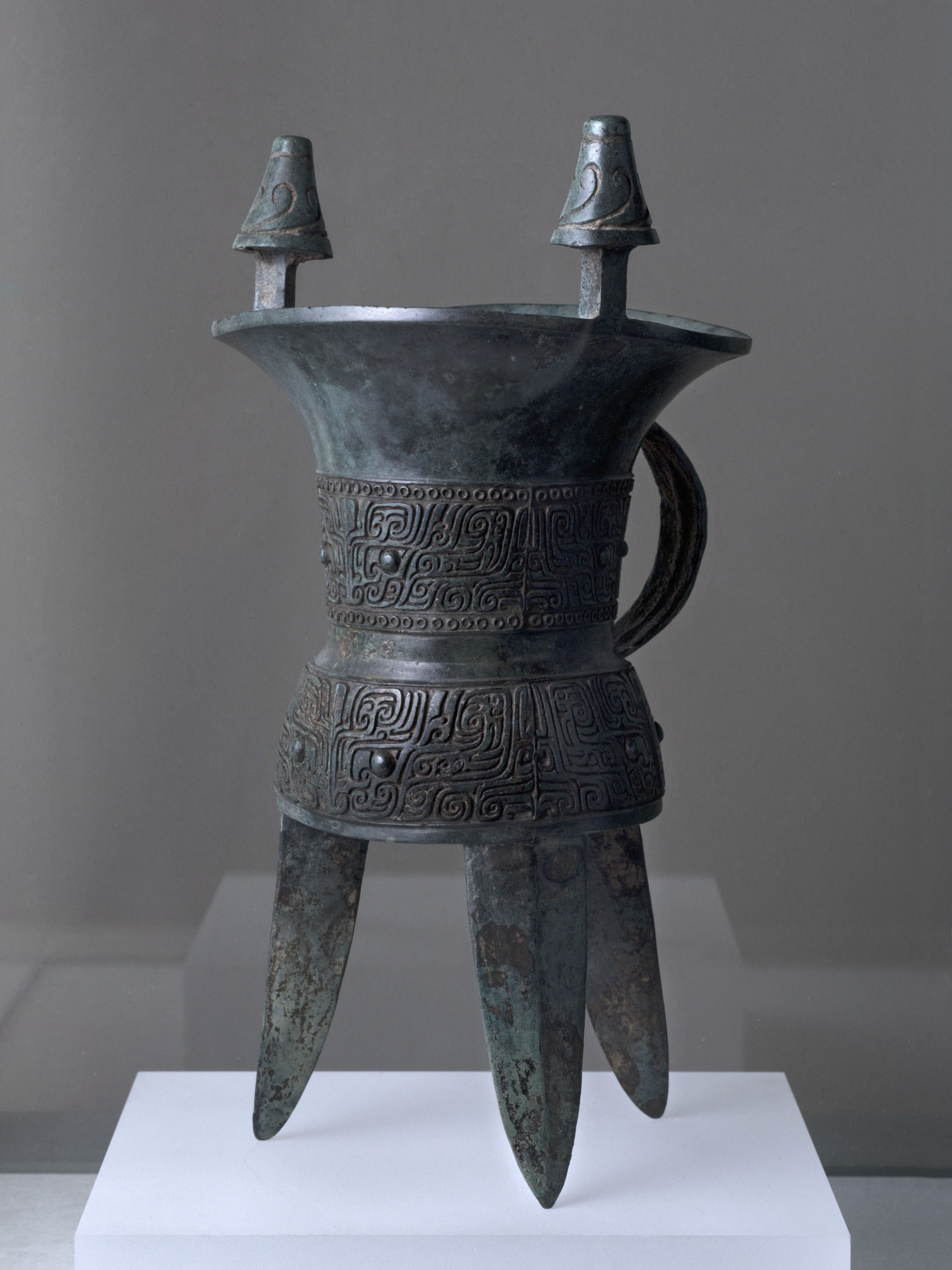
An Early Shang (16th – 14th century BC) bronze jia vessel decorated by the taotie motif – Musée Cernuschi, Paris

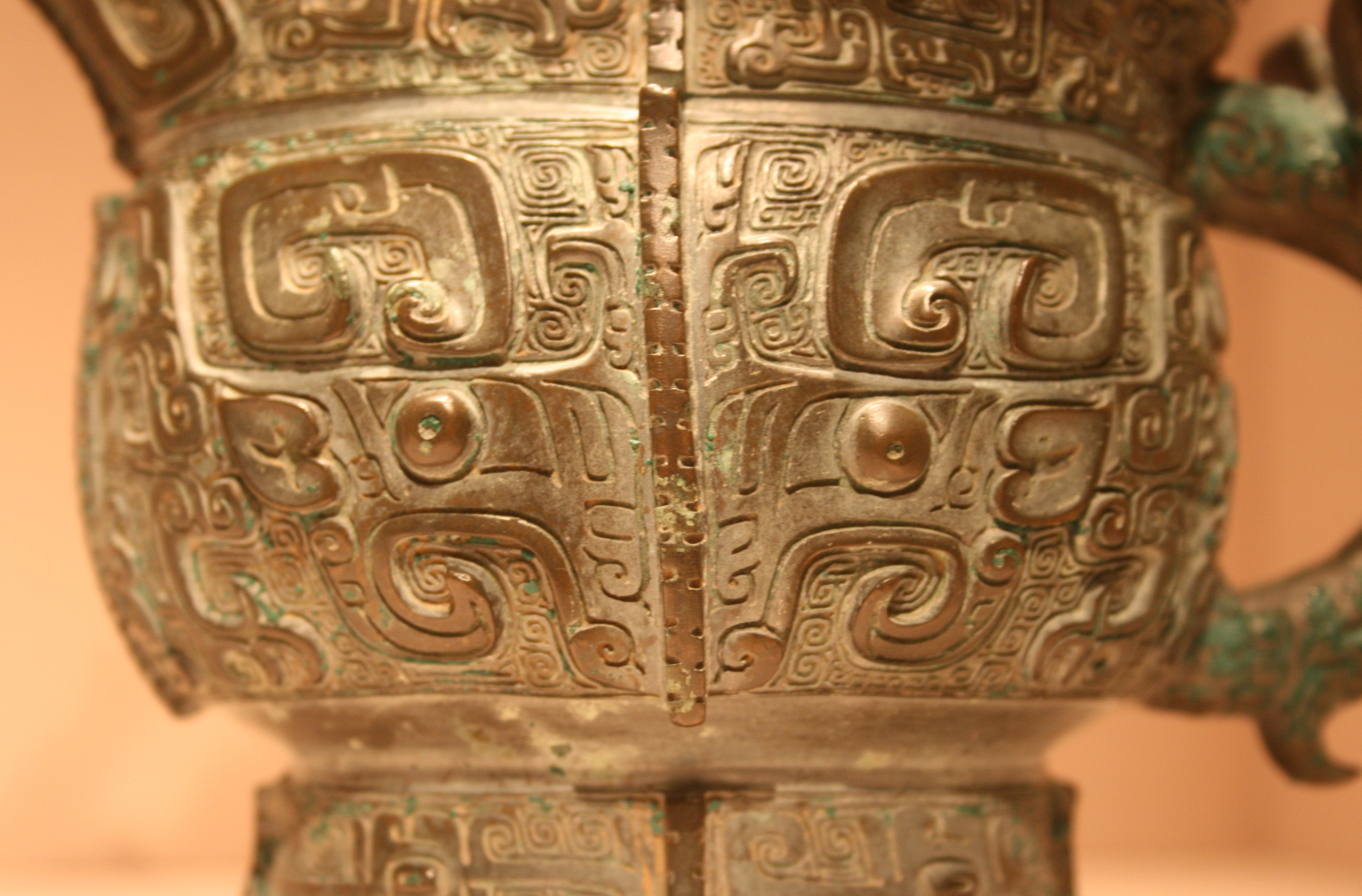
Taotie motif on a Late Shang gong vessel (12th century BC) – Freer-Sackler Galleries, Smithsonian Institution, Washington, D.C.

Shang art was predominantly religious in its nature, being an effective means of conveying the elite authority to the Shang – most of whom were probably illiterate. Shang artistic expressions bear no explicit relations to the pantheon described in oracle bone texts; rather, their art manifested evolving spiritual meanings through zoomorphic images.

Various religious principles guided Shang ritual art. One such basis was the dualistic outlook of Shang cosmology, corroborated by the symmetry often seen in Shang visual representations. Impersonalisation of Shang ancestor worship was also espoused with the art avoiding depiction of ancestors in direct human form. In addition, Shang art shows signs of influence from the concept of yi metamorphism, probably manifested in animal images found on vessels and sculptures.

Characteristic of Shang ritual art is the taotie animal face mask, a bronze motif that appears in both the Early and Late Shang periods. (Note: The name taotie, meaning 'greedy glutton' as now understood, was a name coined during the Zhou period and applied to the corresponding Shang motif by the Song dynasty (960 – 1279 AD) archaeologists. Several scholars have suggested that it may not be a correct term in the Shang context.) Taotie typically represents a central ridge surrounded by various animal beings, including deer, horses, dragons, and phoenixes, often blended with human features.

The taotie alluded to the spirit world probably in a general rather than specific manner. More specific meanings of this motif have been proposed, including an early projection of the celestial pole in Shang cosmology, a symbol of ancestor spirits in disguise, or the spirits of Shang ritual animals. The latter has been rejected by Ladislav Kesner, who instead states that the taotie was a theriomorphic image that gradually acquired spiritual association with monsters.

The use of colour appears to have been an embellishment of Shang ritual, with the particular combination of red and black seen as embodying mystical, magical, and cosmological essence. Main colourants include lacquer, from which came paintings that adorn coffins of kings and even those of Shang military leaders stationed faraway from royal centres. Red and black pigments also seem to have been applied to divination, either as written by brushes or filled in carved characters. Cinnabar, another main colourant that produced red shades, was used to fill in bone cracks and graphs, such as in the case of Huayuanzhuang lineage divinations.

=== Cuisine ===
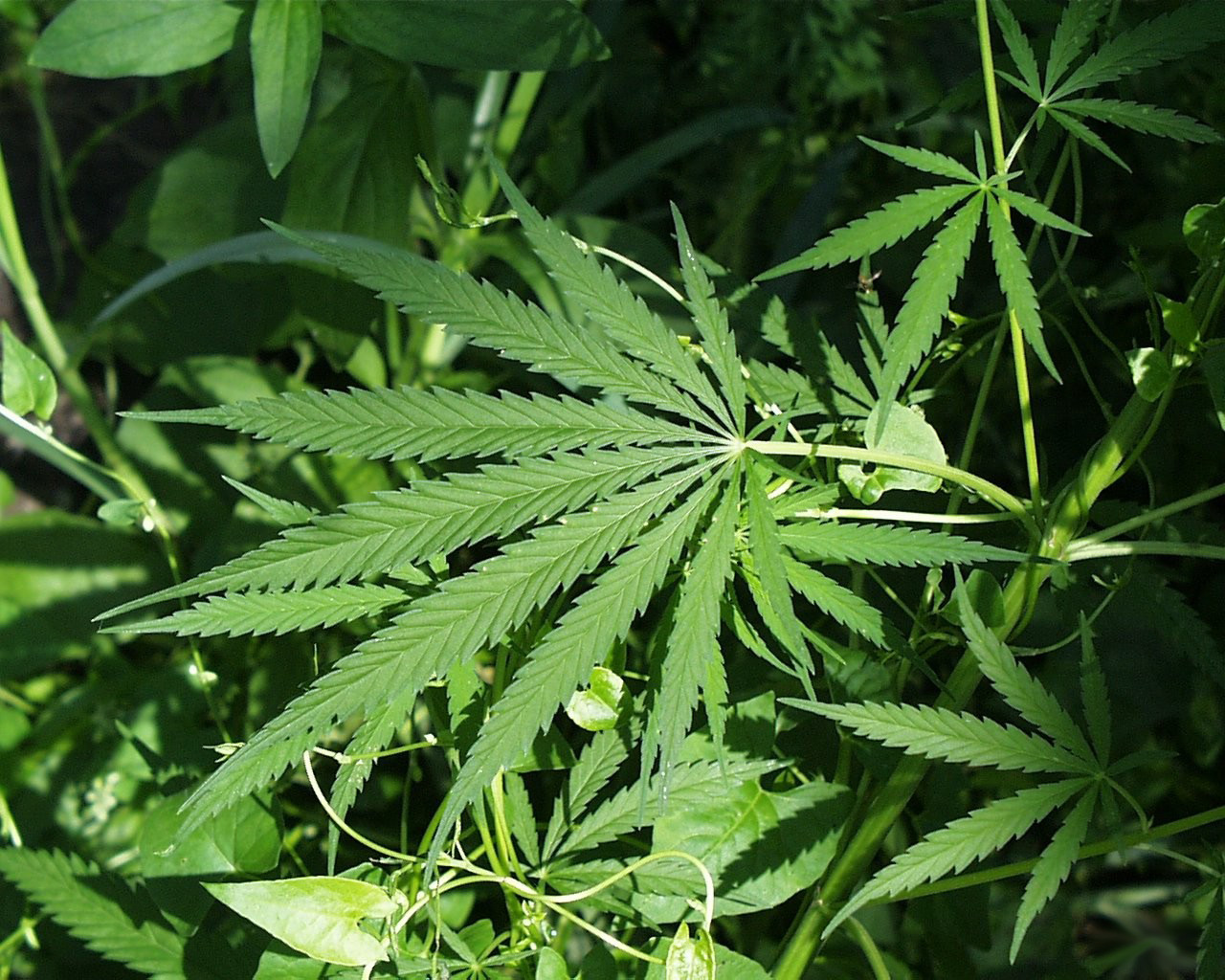
A cannabis plant

The Shang considered sacrificial animals such as cattle to be preferable food, possibly because eating them helped to forge closer connections with the ancestors who were thought to consume the same food. Scholars disagree on whether the Shang practised ritual cannibalism by eating sacrificial humans, or such acts were prohibited.

The consumption of psychoactive agents seemed to be a part of Shang religious culture, with traces of millet wine found in a he vessel, along with evidence for the use of cannabis. These ingredients may have helped induce image distortions that enabled participants to experience the true meaning of artistic motifs on Shang bronzes – resulting in them able to engage in practices that involved spiritual communication. Therefore, visual art and psychoactive cuisine together formed a means of religious facilitation.

=== Music and dance ===
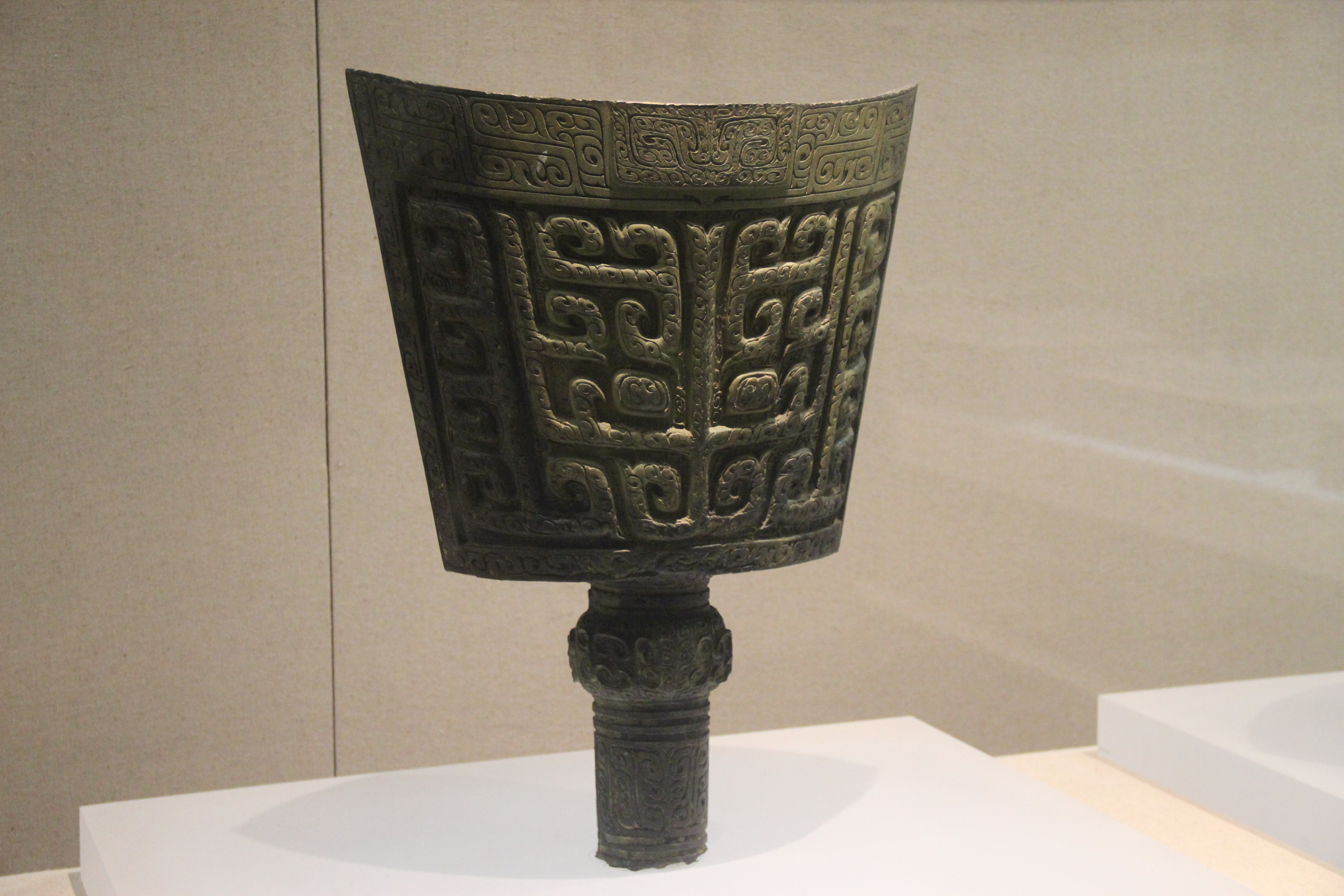
Shang bronze nao bell – Anhui Provincial Museum, Hefei, Anhui

Shang inscriptions indicate that music was an important way to please the spirits, albeit not exclusively reserved for that purpose. The Shang dedicated ritual music to certain ancestors and nature spirits, and traditional literature speaks of Shang temple hymns that were preserved after the fall of the dynasty. Shang musical instruments include nao bells, alligator drums, and chimestones, with animal iconography and vermillion decorating the latter. Such objects were placed within burials and ritual constructions, and they might also accompany sacrificial victims.

Dance was an integral part of Shang ritual, with a degree of significance possibly greater than commonly perceived. The Shang incorporated their dynastic name into the name of one particular dance ritual, suggesting that dancing was an alternative way for them, especially before the appearance of oracle bone inscriptions, to represent their religion. In addition, dances were possibly associated with the zoomorphic motifs in Shang ritual art, and possibly also with the wu mediums.

=== Sacral architecture ===
...大禦王自上甲，
[We shall perhaps perform] the great exorcist ritual, starting from Shang Jia,

其告于祖乙，
And perhaps make an announcement to Grandfather Yi,

在父丁宗卜
Cracking bones at the temple of Father Ding.

— Tunnan 2707

Sacral architecture – also called religious architecture – existed as early as the first phase of the Shang, with ritual constructions identified within both the Early-period settlements at Zhengzhou and Yanshi (Henan province) and the Middle-period centre of Xiaoshuangqiao. The Late period saw the emergence of a ritual complex on a hill near the Huan River whose original layout is difficult to discern. Most scholars agree that the complex's largest central area, called Yi (乙), was the primary locus for religious constructions, while smaller ritual buildings were situated to the south.

In oracle bone inscriptions, temples (宗; zōng) are generally described as including elevated halls (堂; táng), courtyards (庭; tíng) and gates (門; mén). Their design may have been inspired by Shang cosmological principles, such as the celestial pole and the notion of sifang. These temples were dedicated to the Former Lords, the nature spirits, the royal ancestresses, and individual ancestors starting from Da Yi. Temples named for the mainline ancestors were maintained continuously through generations, while those for collateral kings were scarcely recorded and tended to be dismantled after a certain period. The Shang housed in their temples spirit tablets used for ancestor commemoration, though no unequivocal remains of such tablets have been attested.

The Shang also constructed altars, many of which are open-air and located within several ritual loci in the capital. At the locus Yi, for instance, a central open-air pyramidal altar stood together with colonnaded halls and bridges. Modern academics identify this altar with the beng (祊), which Shang inscriptions describe as the altar for worshipping Di as well as the nature and ancestor spirits. Altars of the other loci were modelled after the Yi design.

Access to religious buildings was probably reserved only for the elites. Shang inscriptions suggest that the king routinely prayed to invoke in the temples, assuming a kneeling posture while holding ritual objects in his hands. Sacrificial ceremonies also seem to occur in certain areas of a temple, such as the "Great Hall" and the "Blood Hall", which they sometimes referred to.

=== Ritual bronzeware ===
Shang ritual bronzes were cast by the piece-mould, or section-mould, process rather than by lost-wax casting – a distinction established by the Swedish collector Orvar Karlbeck in 1935 – with outer moulds built in segments around a clay model and then reassembled around a core for casting. The decoration of a vessel was laid out in units corresponding to those mould sections, the vertical flanges falling along the seams. Lukas Nickel has argued from this that ornament was carved into the moulds rather than onto the model, which would account both for the taotie being rarely mirror-symmetrical and for vessels of identical shape never carrying identical decoration – among them the fifty-three gu beakers from the Tomb of Fu Hao, no two of which are ornamented alike. (Note: Nickel's argument runs against the prevailing view, associated with Noel Barnard and Robert Bagley, that most ornament was executed on the model and transferred to the mould.)

== Ritual economy ==
The Shang, possibly with specialised care, institutionalised a ritual economy to perpetuate their religion. Modern scholarship associates the high frequency of Shang rituals with a considerable economic cost, contributing to a ritual expense which might make up 10% of ancient China's total gross domestic product. Such investments in religion may have motivated Shang labourers with promised reciprocal blessings from the deities.

Most divinations concerning economic activities focus on the provisioning of sacrifices. The Late-period ritual economy is estimated to have provided the practitioners with up to 500,000 cattle individuals, together with even larger numbers of pigs and sheep. Their ritual consumption also functioned as a mechanism for Shang food redistribution. Cattle herding contributed to the supplying of oracle bones, which may number up to millions even only during the Late period.

At the Late Shang capital, the demand for sacrificial bronzes led to millions of labour hours with the input possibly comprising hundreds of tonnes of metal, the sources of which may include lands beyond the domain of direct Shang control. Late Shang human sacrifice is described as contributing to a significant decrease in the working population, as the human victims possibly had been under forced labour when waiting for their final ritual executions. The loss of such economic power during the 200 years of Late Shang is variously estimated as ranging from 10,000 to 200,000 sacrificed labourers, most of whom were probably not recorded in Shang inscriptions.

The state ritual economy was augmented by similar, smaller versions commissioned by Shang elites. An external exchange network was maintained from the Early to Late periods, supplying ritual items through trade, gifting, and tribute. In particular, inscriptions record tributary polities such as Que (雀) providing the Shang with oracle bones, and there are ritual cowries obtained through long trade routes that extended to the Indian Ocean.

== Political effects ==
Shang character for Kui (夔)

Shang religion served as a source of political power and legitimation for the governing elite. (Note: Two authorities of Shang studies, Kwang-chih Chang and David Keightley, similarly established causal connections between the religion of the Shang and their political constitution. These have been scrutinised by Campbell, who argues that the two scholars did not specify the nature of these connections.) Royal ancestors, in particular, were a unique factor that culminated in the authority of the kings. In contrast, ancestor-like Former Lords such as Kui and Wang Hai may have been either imported non-royal Shang deities, or spirits adopted from the religions of local cultures absorbed by the Shang; venerating them as part of a state religion secured for the Shang kings their right to rule over the peoples whose deities were adopted. Similarly, worship of the Sun might have been a way for the king to hold sway over lineages other than his, by inviting them to participate in state rituals.

The acts of worship themselves were sources of political power, with royal divination and sacrifices influential factors shaping state and royal authority. Notably in this practice, the living king seemed to acquire his political prestige from the fact that divinatory inscriptions always verify his prognostications, a strategic move whereby failed predictions were censored from such texts.

The priority of ancestors over ancestresses seen in Shang religion was mirrored by a gender bias in their political landscape, in which men were considered more important. The birth of boys by royal consorts was seen as auspicious; many inscriptions express concern about such events, particularly that of Fu Hao.

As prominent means of Shang violence, war and hunting were strongly influenced by religion. Warfare was seen as both a form of world pacification which the Shang viewed as service to the ancestral order, as well as a cultural practice motivated by the nature of sacrificial rituals. Closely linked to warfare is the frequent activity of hunting, which served to demonstrate royal authority, mystical power, the mastery of animal spirits, and the connection that hunting drew between the Shang and the spirit world. Hunting was not confined to the king alone, but extended to the allies and the lineage leaders.

== History ==
=== Prehistoric precursors ===
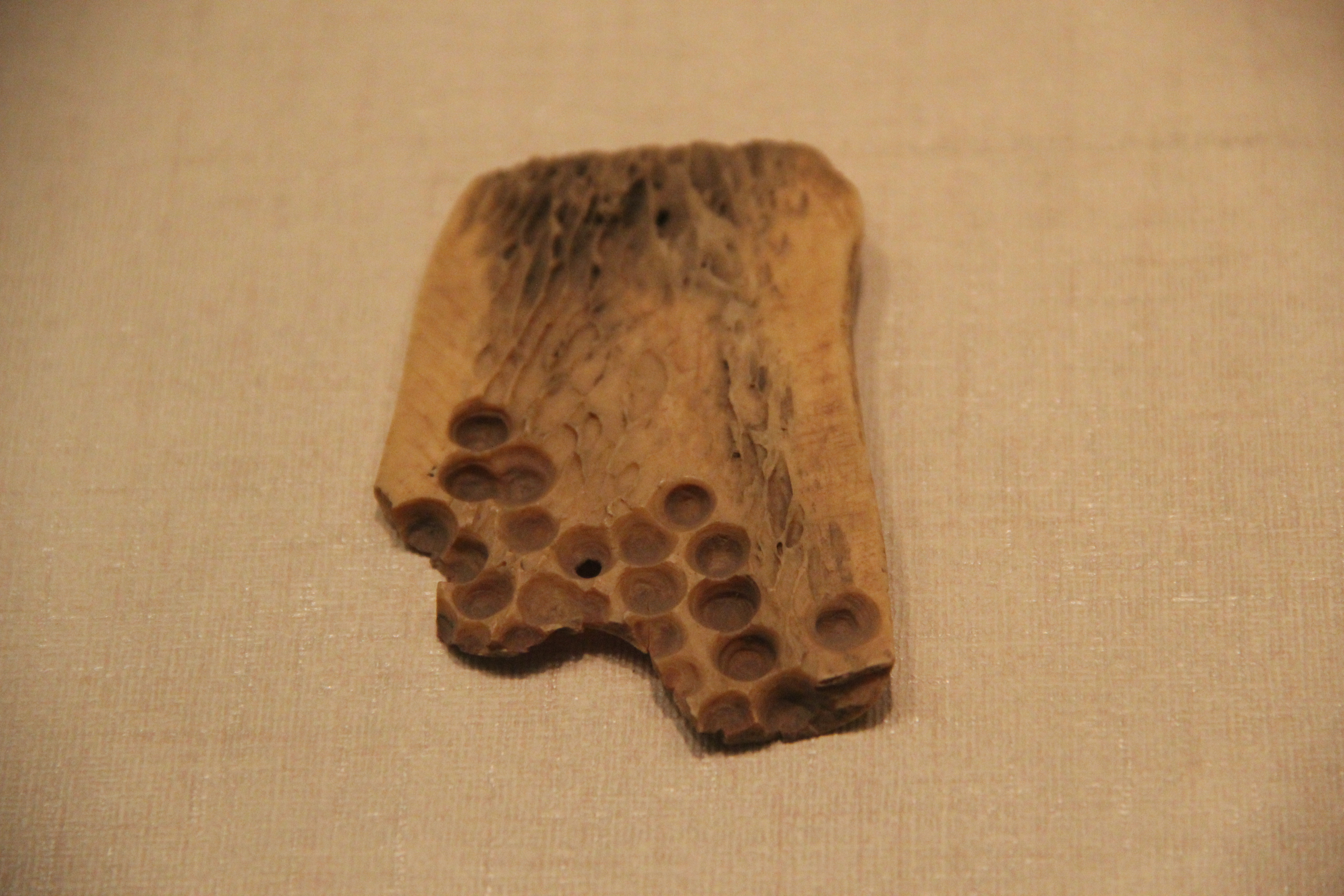
Prehistoric oracle bone of the Xiajiadian culture – Liaoning Museum, Shenyang

Before the emergence of the Shang, China was inhabited by various prehistoric cultures, which practised spiritual communication through a variety of methods – including prayers, grave goods, and animal sacrifice. Sinologists such as Kwang-chih Chang propose the existence of shamanic practices in Neolithic Chinese traditions, but their theory is not supported by any clear evidence. The prehistoric Chinese already engaged in pyromantic divination with oracle bones, namely scapulae from cattle, sheep, pigs, and deer. The use of ritual jades in spiritual communication was also a Neolithic tradition transmitted to the Shang religion.

Shang cosmology may have its origin in those prehistoric cultures, some of which produced artefacts bearing an anthropo-zoomorphic motif – a possible ancestor of the Shang taotie and is likely a Neolithic projection of the same celestial pole that the Shang observed. A connection possibly exists between the anthropo-zoomorphic motif and Shang ancestor worship, with theories postulating its likely ancestral or spiritually protective representation. Another rectangular design from the northern Qijia culture (c. 2200 – c. 1600 BC) may also be the origin of the taotie.

Traditional Chinese historiography dates ancestral worship anterior to the Shang period. For example, the second king of the Xia dynasty (c. 2070 – c. 1600 BC), Qi, was described in multiple texts as a spirit-medium who communicated with Shangdi and performed sacrifices to the deceased. The Book of Documents also mentions Emperor Shun – one of the legendary Three Sovereigns and Five Emperors whose reign predated even the Xia – conducting rituals such as divination and sacrifices to Shangdi. Although these periods are often considered mythical, their corresponding site of Erlitou (c. 2100 – c. 1500 BC) offers evidence of religious activities making use of bronze that were later adopted and developed by the Shang dynasty, such as the use of scapulae for divination.

=== Early to Late Shang ===
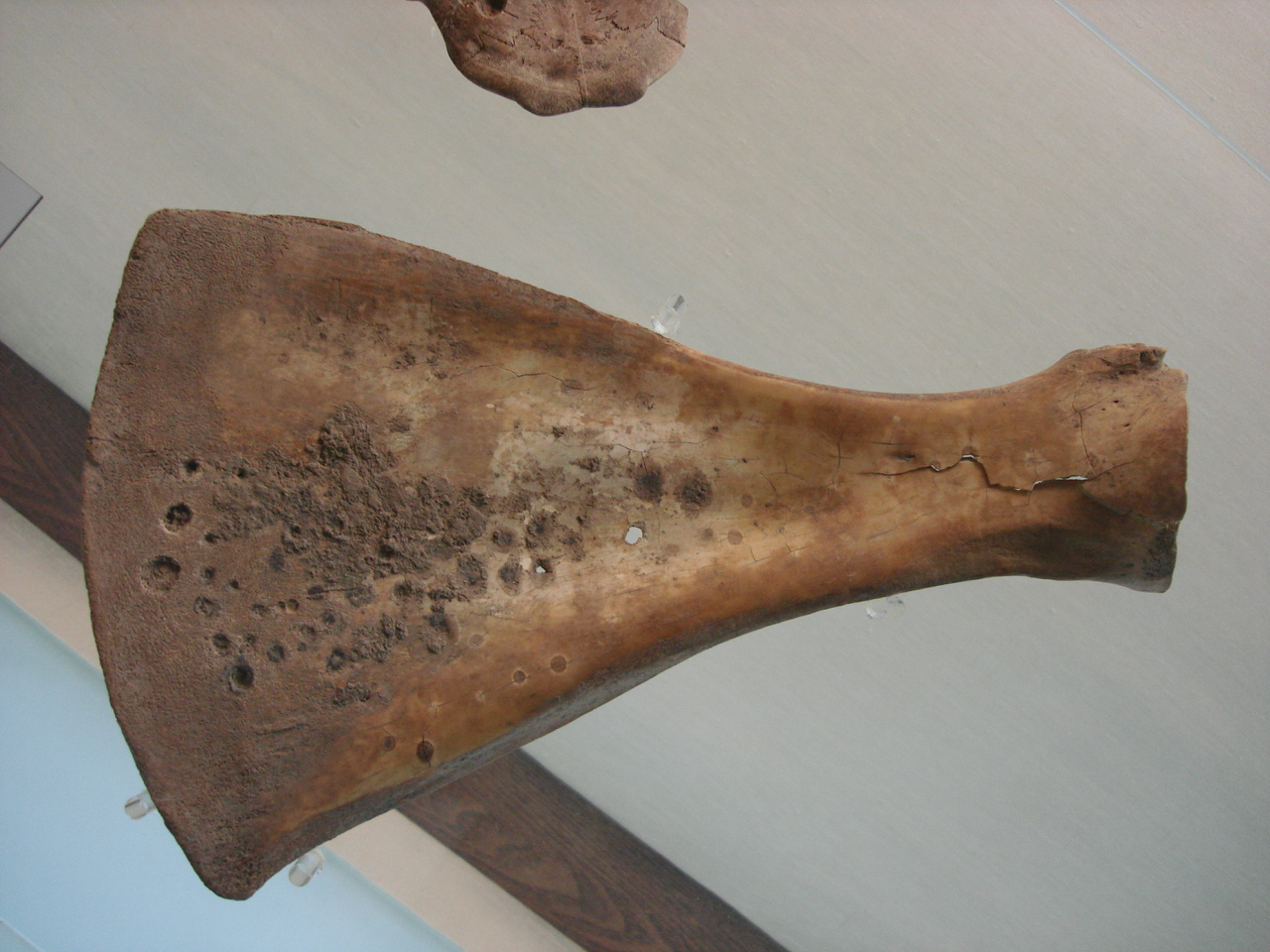
An Early Shang oracle bone fragment, prior to the appearance of inscriptions – Zhengzhou City Museum

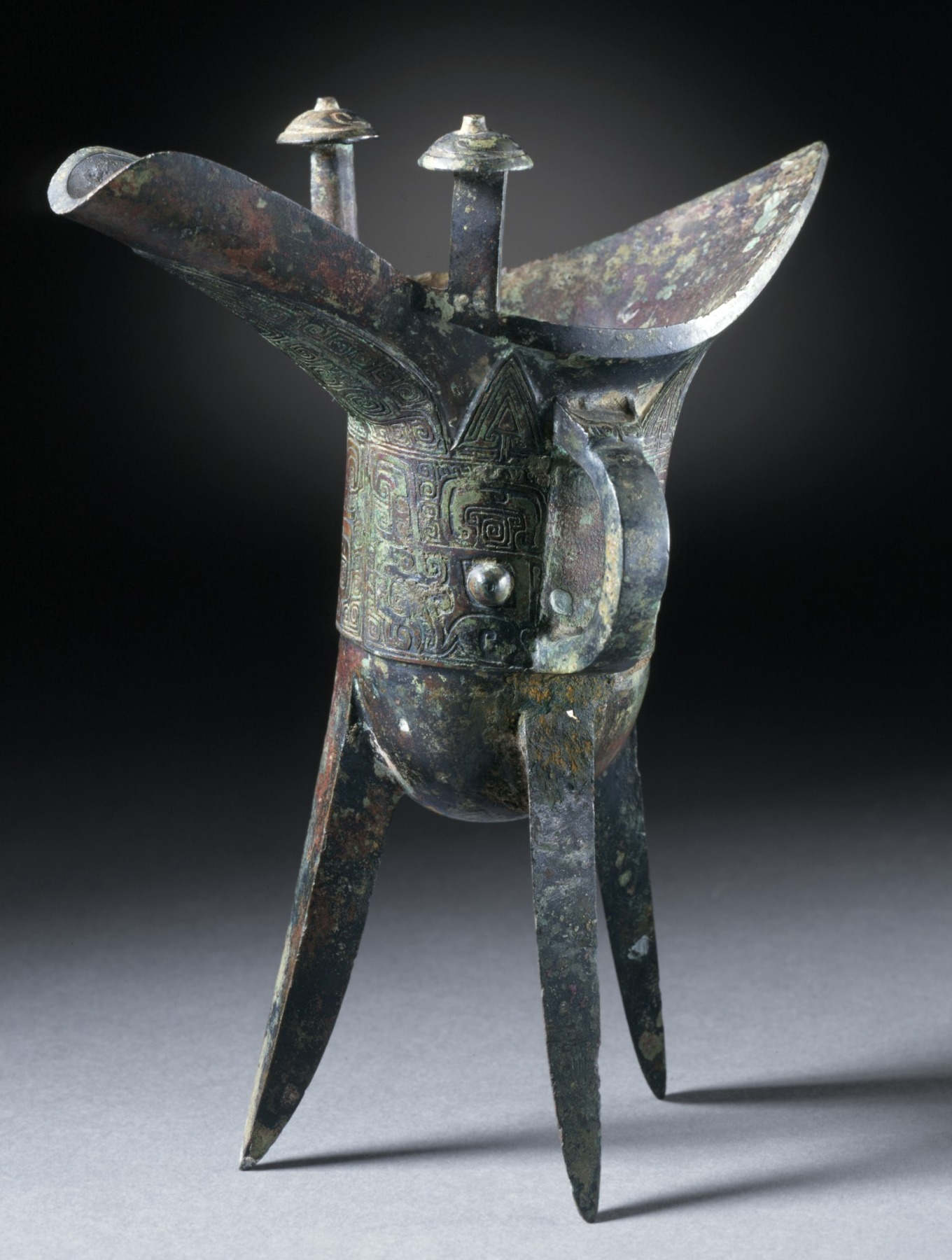
Late Shang ritual jue vessel, c. 1300 – c. 1050 BC – Los Angeles County Museum of Art

A large amount of oracle bones appear in pre–Late Shang sites, suggesting the prevalence of divination by the elites, although it was also probably practised by non-royal people. Early Shang pyromancy already involved pretreatment of oracle bones, but they were without systematic standardisation. Cattle bones then seemed to be accorded high status, and were likely associated with certain diviners. The Early Shang was also characterised by the prevalence of communal rituals, along with the institution of ritual violence.

The Middle Shang (c. 1400 – c. 1250 BC) saw the emergence of a more complex ritual system unseen in the Early period, with divination, sacrifices, and funerary practices more developed and systematic than their predecessors. Excavations at the Middle Shang site of Taixi have revealed departures from earlier traditions, including the burial of death attendants with tomb owners, together with a decline in the number of tombs without grave goods. Taixi, however, was yet to feature clear separations between ritual and residential space.

Shang religion underwent changes as it transitioned to the Late Shang (c. 1250 – c. 1050 BC), a period that witnessed the earlier cult system being transformed into a massive and sophisticated ritual structure, accompanied by the unprecedented flourishing of the ritual economy. Wu Ding – as the first Late Shang ruler – already initiated ritual formalisation attempts, which his son Zu Jia later developed into a series of reform, resulting in a disciplined cult structure that entitled the Shang to more control over spiritual communications. Zu Jia's reforms most prominently included the official institution of the five-sacrifice ritual schedule. Under the succeeding reigns of Lin Xin and Geng Ding, the practice of binary divination charges common during Wu Ding's era was neglected, especially with divinations on the five sacrifices.

By the final years of the Shang, the nature of Shang religion had changed significantly. The high god Di and nature spirits frequently appeared in divinations during Wu Ding's reign, but were rarely mentioned during the last reigns when ancestors became dominant. The Shang also switched their worship between the Former Lords, such as Huang Yin – whose cult was prevalent during the reign of Wu Ding – being replaced by Yi Yin during the reign of Wu Yi. (Note: Some scholars such as Qiu Xigui, however, takes Huang Yin and Yi Yin to be identical spirits.) The period of Di Yi and Di Xin likely witnessed significant secularisation, with humans increasingly believed to be able to control the world without the need for Di and the spirits.

During these final decades, the five-ritual sacrificial cycle seemed to fall into disuse, or it was still practised but no longer recorded. Possibly during this time, a new sacrificial schedule began to be employed. Divination also changed, with the king acting as the sole diviner, and topics almost virtually confined to royal hunts and cyclical sacrifices. These divinations tended to be optimistic and were not likely to request actions from ancestors, suggesting that the Shang changed their beliefs about the ability of the living to communicate with spirits through divination.

=== Continuation under the Zhou dynasty ===
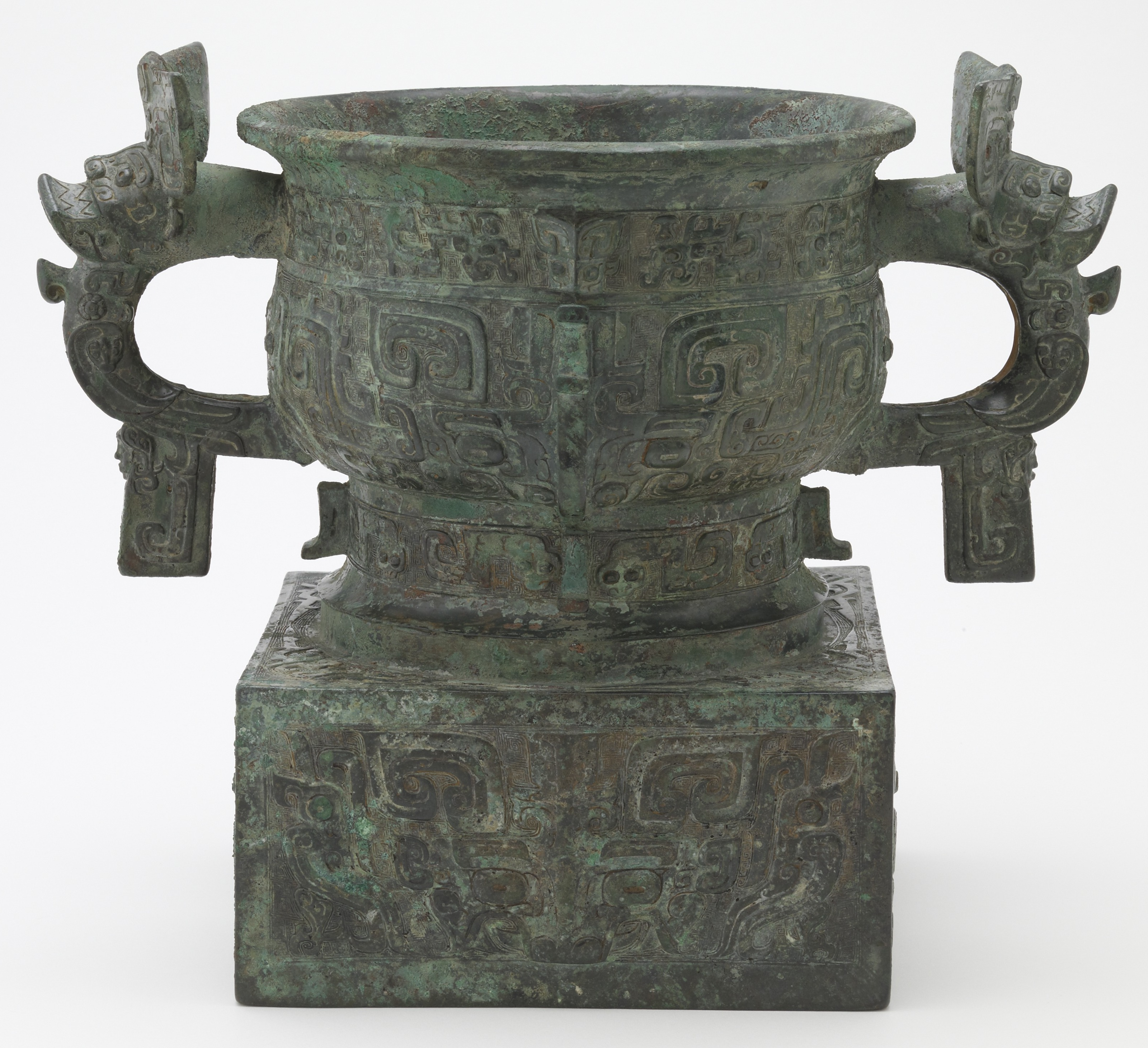
Western Zhou gui with taotie, late 11th – early 10th centuries BC – Freer-Sackler Galleries, Smithsonian Institution, Washington, D.C.

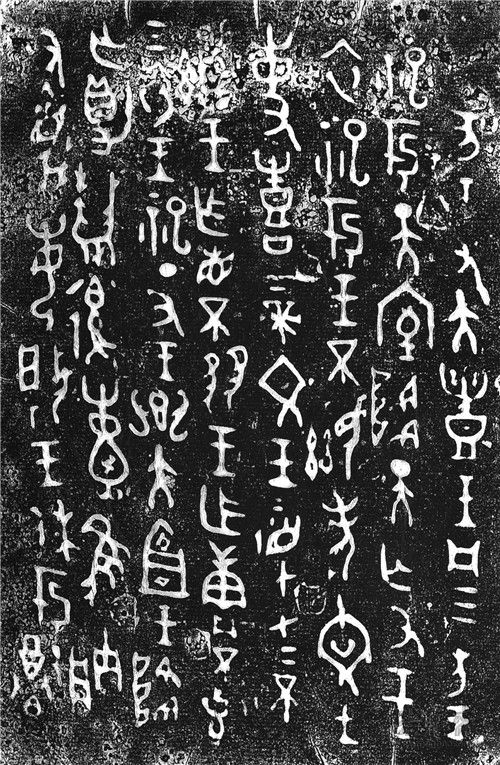
Rubbing of the Tian Wang gui, containing inscription praising Zhou ancestors and the high god Di

Around 1046 BC, the Shang under the king Di Xin collapsed, and were replaced by the Zhou dynasty following the Zhou victory in the Battle of Muye. Following the conquest was a Zhou process of espousing Shang culture. Zhou historiography denounces Di Xin, not only for his purported licentiousness and drunkenness, but also for his alleged ignorance of ancestor worship. (Note: However, Shang inscriptions indicate that the final king of Shang was not as religiously ignorant as has been traditionally described.)

The Zhou royals enfranchised Di Xin's son Wu Geng to continue overseeing Shang ancestor worship, and after Wu Geng's death in his rebellion, another Shang aristocrat named Weizi was enfeoffed as the new patron of Shang religious practice. (Note: The official Shang religion perpetuated by Weizi's lineage is believed to have faded throughout the Zhou dynastic course, and the situation was purportedly improved only after the recovery of Shang temple hymns by a minister serving Weizi's descendants.) Other Shang elites who survived the Zhou conquest continued the Shang religion as Zhou royal scribes, observing sacrifices to spirits such as Wen Ding. Some early Western Zhou (c. 1046 – 771 BC) tombs near modern Beijing were constructed in accordance with Shang burial customs, suggesting that these could have been tombs for later members of the Shang line following their usurpation.

The Zhou adopted the Shang liturgical calendar, although it is uncertain whether they reset the day count following their establishment. The Zhou replaced si (祀) – the Shang word denoting a ritual cycle – by the term nian (年), and they gradually developed a bias towards the 24th sexagenary day dinghai (丁亥). The calendar underwent its final major diversification during the Warring States period (c. 475 – 221 BC) with the increasing cultural divergence between Chinese states. A new system of posthumous names for dead relatives was devised, although some early Zhou royals were still assigned stem-names. (Note: The stem-name tradition appears to have spread over a large area during the Shang-Zhou transition. An example is an early Zhou cemetery in Gaojiapu, Shaanxi.)

Western Zhou notions of Di was integrated with the conception of their own supreme being Tian, with both terms sometimes used interchangeably in inscriptions. Yet, the Zhou still conceived of Di differently from Tian, in that the latter could inflict calamities, while the former was always seen as a divine protector presiding over Zhou royal ancestors and a source of their dynastic existence. (Note: The Zhou strategically forged their own royal lineage coming back directly to Di, which transformed the being into their own guardian.) Already during King Wu of Zhou's reign (r. 1050–1043 BC), Zhou liturgists made an inscription on the Tian Wang gui tureen about the king pleasing Di with sacrifices. (Note: The first sentences dealing with Di within the Tian Wang gui inscription is translated as follows: Yǐhài-day The King held the Great Rite. The King rode in a boat on three sides [of the sacral lake]. The King sacrificed on Mount Tiānshì and descended. Tiānwáng assisted the King. He made a great sacrifice to the King, The illustrious deceased father, King Wén. He served God on High with a sacrifice of white millet. King Wén is stern on high.)

The early Zhou retained their Predynastic pyromancy, with Zhou oracle bone records of cult dedicated to Shang ancestors such as Di Yi – owing to their former recognition of Shang suzerainty. Zhou pyromancy followed the Shang in its interconnection with political power, and in preserving the Shang text format of the preface, charge, prognostication and verification. The concern of auspicious and ominous weekdays in Shang divinatins formed the basis for later development of Eastern Zhou (771 – 256 BC) hemerology, including the Wuxing philosophy. Bronze vessels central to Shang ritual, such as the ding and gui, continued to be employed in Zhou contexts as an extension of the Shang bronze tradition and its religious values.

Despite Zhou inheritance of the Shang religion, Shang ancestors were still gradually replaced by Zhou royal spirits as the major sacrificial recipients, together with the Former Lords and nature powers virtually vanishing from the Zhou religious landscape. Shang human sacrifice declined through time despite Western Zhou integration of Shang sacrificial rituals to their ancestor cult. The Zhou did not document oracle bone records as extensively as the Shang, and they also cultivated their separate divinatory practices through texts such as the Zhou Changes (周易; Zhōuyì).

=== Imperial and modern legacy ===
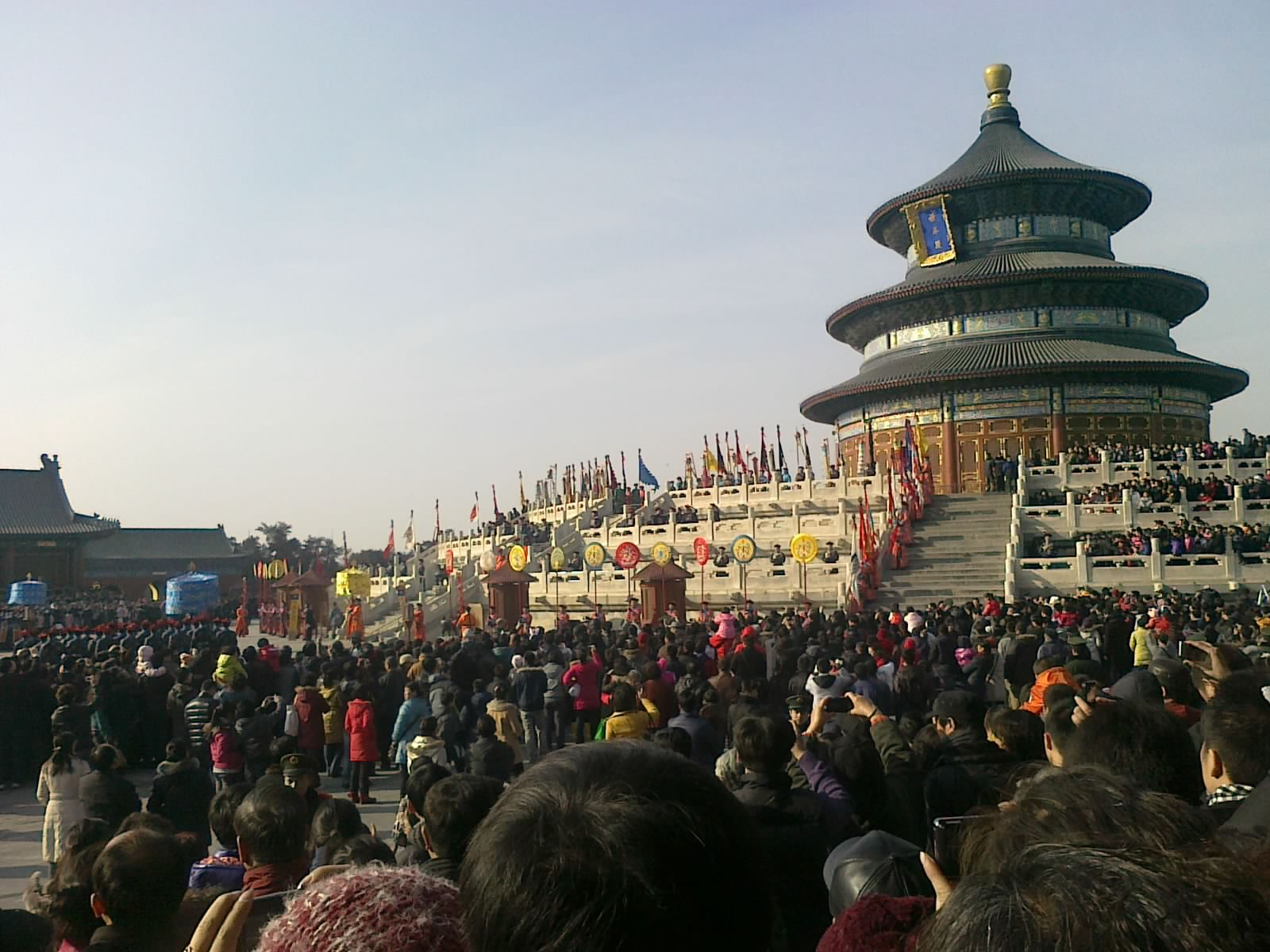
The 2011 observation of the annual Sacrifice to Heaven at the Temple of Heaven in Beijing

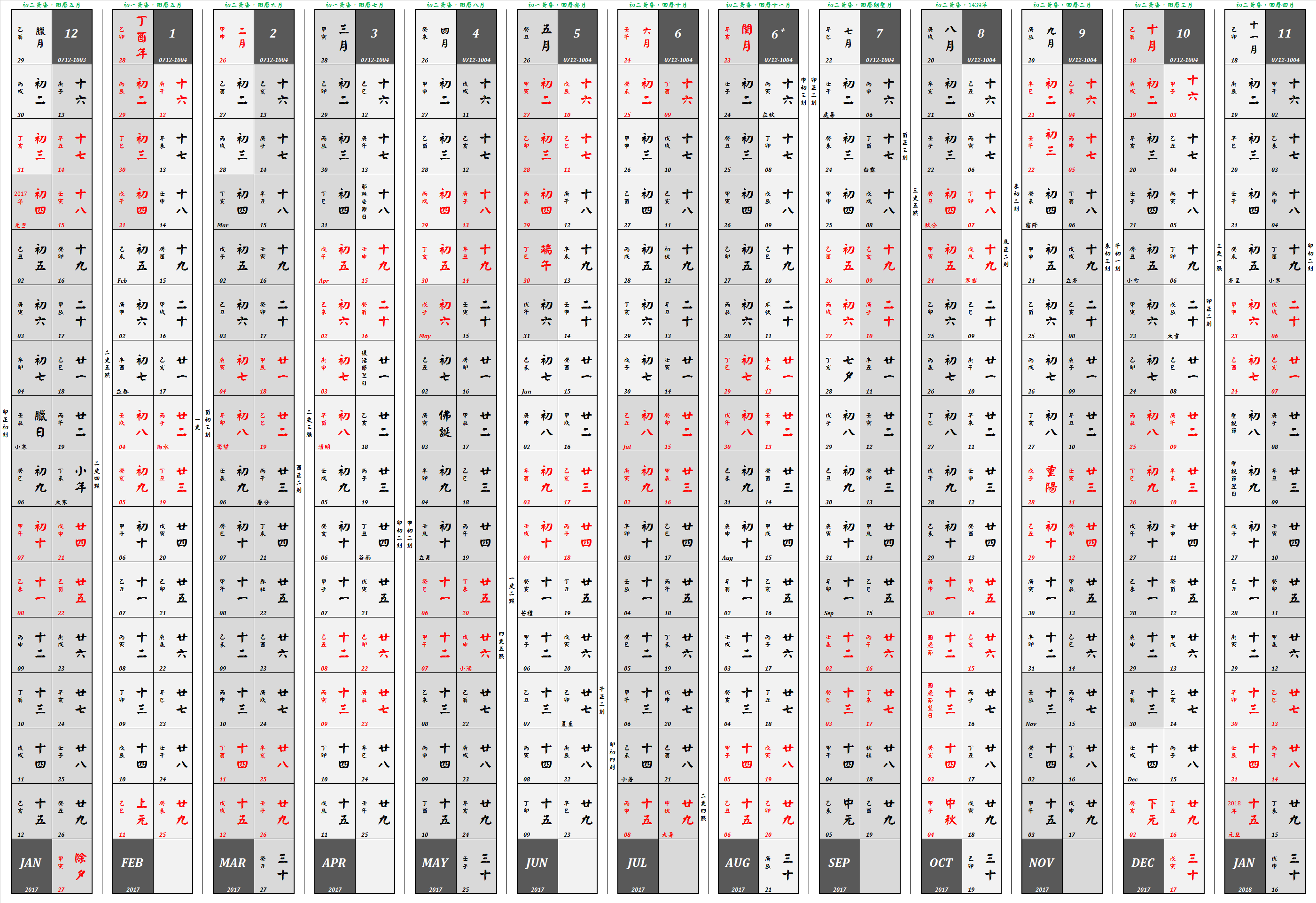
Chinese calendar for 2017

The later Chinese conception of Shangdi, the supreme deity in classical texts, was derived from the Shang theology of their high god Di. The term Shangdi (上帝) was absorbed into ''The Sublime Heavens'' (皇天; huángtiān), first appearing in the name for the Jade Emperor of Taoism (玉皇上帝; Yùhuáng Shàngdì) during the Eastern Han (25 – 220 AD). During the late Ming dynasty (1368 – 1644 AD), the Jesuit missionary Matteo Ricci introduced the use of Shangdi as the Chinese name for the Christian God, aiming to resonate Roman Catholicism with Chinese traditional beliefs.

The worship of the first Shang dynastic ancestor, Da Yi, only terminated with the start of the Eastern Han. Some Shang nature spirits including the Mother of the West and Mother of the East possibly evolved into Han deities, such as the Taoist Queen Mother of the West (西王母; Xī Wángmǔ) and King Father of the East (東王公; Dōng Wánggōng). They might also have evolved into Changxi and Xihe, whom Han lore mentioned as wives of the purported Shang progenitor Di Jun (i.e. Emperor Ku).

Shang pyromancy continued to the Han era and lasted even further, with an oracle bone dated to the Tang period (618 – 907 AD). The Shang sexagenary cycle persisted for over three millennia in China, and, due to their former status as client states of China, countries such as Vietnam, Korea and Japan also adopted the system. (Note: For example, the annual Lunar New Year's Eve CCTV New Year's Gala has continued to announce the sexagenary term of the upcoming year.) The legacy of the particular significance afforded to males by the Shang can be seen in contemporary Chinese culture, with families expecting sons more than daughters.

During the reign of the Song dynasty (960 – 1279 AD) emperor Huizong (1100 – 1126 AD), the imperial government initiated attempts to revive the Shang-Zhou ritual system. Particularly, emperor Huizong opened up state institutions for manufacturing bronze vessels modelled after that of the Shang ritual bronzes, which had been excavated by Song antiquarians earlier.

Other legacies that the Shang left to later periods include ancestor worship, the role of divination in politics, as well as the patrimonial state where religion and politics were interwoven together. Their religion exerted considerable influence even on the secular sphere during Imperial times.

== In later accounts ==
Ancient Chinese literature from the Eastern Zhou (771 – 256 BC) and Han periods is frequently employed by Chinese archaeologists to explain Bronze Age traditions that predated these eras by centuries. Linear projections of history espoused by those ancient texts often picture Shang religion as prefiguring many later elements of Chinese ideologies. However, what these narratives offer about the Shang is considerably different from that attested in oracle bone inscriptions, indicating that their authors had limited knowledge about the Shang world.

=== Zhou classical accounts ===
One of the Chinese classics written during the Zhou dynasty (c. 1046 – 256 BC), the Book of Documents, contains moral discourses on Shang traditions, including the belief that the Shang ancestor Tang would send down calamities on unworthy men. The text also includes an oblique description of Shang pyromancy, with a reference to Pan Geng lauding those who did not "presumptuously oppose the decision of the tortoise". However, Zhou writers generally focused on criticising the lavish lifestyle and ignorance of the final Shang kings, and did not initially mention either the Shang practice of human sacrifice or their recognition of royal consorts. In addition, the Zhou description that the Shang associated human virtue with the supreme deity is nowhere confirmed in Shang oracle bone inscriptions.

The Book of Documents chapter Gaozong rongri may contain an implicit mention of the Shang ritual structure's five cyclical sacrifices, albeit with considerably vague evidence for verification. The philosopher Confucius (c. 551 – 479 BC) is believed to have said that Zhou-era records of the state of Song – the successor state of the Shang – were not sufficient to reconstruct the Shang ritual system as a whole.

=== Sima Qian's description ===
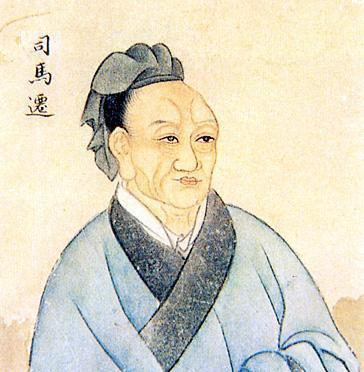
Sima Qian wrote about Shang religious practices a millennium after the dynasty's fall.

Discourse on the Shang religion was found in the writings of the Han dynasty (202 BC – 220 AD) historian Sima Qian, a millennium after the dynasty's fall. Sima claimed that the Shang were marked by their utmost devotion to divination and sacrifices, and had decayed from the mark of piety into a state of superstition, which Burton Watson considered substantiated claims that resonate with evidence collected from modern archaeology. Sima Qian appeared to be informed about some Shang divinatory practices, including the disposal of used oracle bones. Sima's posthumous names in terms of both stem and prefix for Shang kings largely match those given by the Shang inscriptions. However, his description of the Shang religion is not without flaw, as it was coloured with characteristics of the Han dynasty during which Sima lived.

Zu Jia's ritual reforms are never mentioned in Sima Qian's writings – which describe his reign as one of disorder and immorality – suggesting that the reforms were unknown to the composers of the traditional accounts who lived centuries after Zu Jia. Sima Qian's accusation of disorder might have originated from propaganda of the Predynastic Zhou who possibly regarded Zu Jia's ritual reforms as a threat, or from that of Zu Jia's opponents who were against his empowerment of mainline kings.

=== Jin dynasty accounts ===
References to the Shang tradition of yearly ritual cycles are found in a fourth-century commentary to the Erya, written by the Jin dynasty scholar Guo Pu. The account claims that the Shang conducted the major sacrificial cycle si which lasted for 'four seasons', suggesting that knowledge of the Shang ritual calendar and its association with a solar year was preserved to the Imperial era.
