= Wang Hai of Shang =

Ruler of Predynastic Shang

Wang Hai 王亥
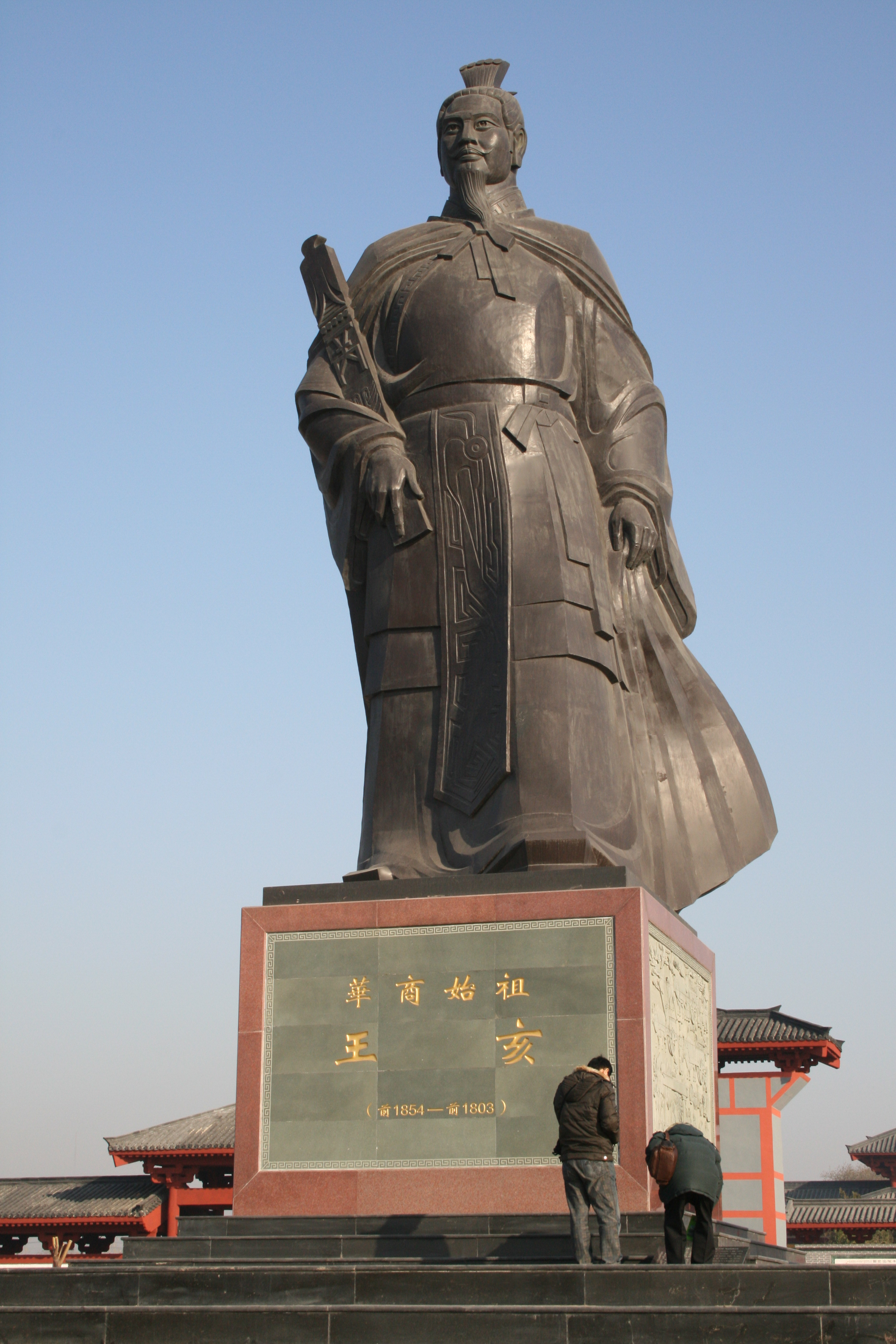
- Statue of Wang Hai in Shangqiu

Ruler of Predynastic Shang
- Predecessor: Ming of Shang
- Successor: Wang Gen of Shang
- Died: 12th year of Xie of Xia's reign Youyi (有易, modern-day Yi County, Hebei)
- Issue: Shang Jia
Names
- Family name: Zi (子); Given name: Zhen (振)
Temple name
- Wang Hai (王亥)
- Father: Ming of Shang

Wang Hai of Shang
- Chinese: 王亥
- Literal meaning: "King XII"
Transcriptions
Standard Mandarin
- Hanyu Pinyin: wáng hài
- Bopomofo: ㄨㄤˊ ㄏㄞˋ
- Wade–Giles: wang^{2}-hai^{4}
Wu
- Romanization: ^{6}waon 6ghe
Yue: Cantonese
- Yale Romanization: wong^{4} hoi^{6}
Middle Chinese
- Middle Chinese: hjwang hojX
Old Chinese
- Baxter–Sagart (2014): /*ɢʷaŋ [ɡ]ˤəʔ/

Alternative Chinese name
- Chinese: 振
- Literal meaning: "Zhen"
Transcriptions
Standard Mandarin
- Hanyu Pinyin: zhèn
- Bopomofo: ㄓㄣˋ
- Wade–Giles: chen^{4}
Wu
- Romanization: ^{5}tsen
Yue: Cantonese
- Yale Romanization: zan^{3}
Middle Chinese
- Middle Chinese: tsyinH
Old Chinese
- Baxter–Sagart (2014): /tər-s/

Wang Hai (Chinese: 王亥; pinyin: Wáng Hài), (Note: In this case, Wáng 王 is the clan name 氏, and Hài 亥 the personal name 名.) family name Zi (子), was a ruler of Predynastic Shang and the father of Shang Jia. He is attested on oracle bone inscriptions, and venerated by the Shang as a 'High Ancestor' (高祖; gāozǔ), or, in modern scholarship, a 'Former Lord' (先公; xiāngōng).

Little is known about Wang Hai's reign outside of posthumous accounts, which detail him domesticating horses and oxen, and pioneering Shang dynasty trade practices. He is therefore seen as the "Ancestor of Chinese merchants," even being seen as the origin of Chinese words relating to commerce.

== Names ==
Wang Hai is referred to by a number of names.

In Records of the Grand Historian, Wang Hai is referred to as Zhen (振).

Texts such as the Book of Han, the poem Heavenly Questions in Chu Ci (楚辭), and Shiben (世本) tend to add a radical to the left of Wang Hai's personal name, resulting in the corruptions gāi (垓), hé (核), gāi (該), and hǎi (胲) respectively. In Lüshi Chunqiu (呂氏春秋), he is referred to as yǒng (永).

In the Classic of Mountains and Seas (山海經), Wang Hai is possibly referred to as Shu Hai (豎亥), though this is contradicted by more concrete references appearing in other chapters.

== Early life ==
Wang Hai is said to have been a sixth-generation descendent of Xie of Shang (契), a legendary king who is said to have helped Yu the Great control the Great Floods. His father was Ming of Shang (冥), whom the Bamboo Annals states died in the Yellow River. His brother, Wang Gen of Shang (王恆), would succeed him.

Wang Hai bore one son, Shang Jia (上甲), who would go on to be worshipped as a sun god.

== Posthumous accounts ==
In Records of the Grand Historian, Wang Hai is referred to as Zhen (振). However, he is not mentioned beyond his ascending the throne, his death, and Shang Jia taking the throne, leaving Wang Gen of Shang out.

=== In the Bamboo Annals ===
Upon ascending the throne, Wang Hai produced transportation tools for cattle, allowing for improved grazing. However, it led to overproduction. In the twelfth year of Xie of Xia's reign, to solve the overproduction, Wang Hai, after consulting with his brother, Wang Gen of Shang, decided to go to the Youyi Tribe (有易; modern-day Yi County, Hebei), taking some energetic shepherds with sheep and cattle to them. However, as a man named Mianchen had a wife who fell in love with Wang Hai, so he conspired to assassinate him, cutting him into eight pieces with an axe. He was later captured and presented to the ruler of the Youyi.

The Bamboo Annals also state that Wang Hai led his people to Yin in the 33rd year of Mang of Xia's reign.

=== In the Classic of Mountains and Seas ===
In the Classic of Mountains and Seas (山海經), Wang Hai is mentioned concretely as a folk deity in a place called the Kingdom of Kunmin (困民國), which echoes the accounts in the Bamboo Annals.

有困民國，勾姓而食。有人曰王亥，兩手操鳥，方食其頭。王亥託于有易，河伯僕牛。有易殺王亥，取僕牛。河念有易，有易潛出，為國於獸，方食之，名曰搖民。帝舜生戲，戲生搖民。

Here we have the Kingdom of Kunmin, whose people bear the family name Gou (勾 "Hook"), who [also] eat this way [millet and use four birds]. There was a person called Wang Hai who, with two hands, took a bird, then went to ate its head. Wang Hai entrusted himself with the Youyi (有易) tribe and became a shepherd for the river lord Hebo 河伯. However, the Youyi killed him for his cattle. The river felt a bond with the Youyi and helped them secretly escape to live among beasts, eating them. This new nation was called the Yaomin (搖民). Emperor Shun (帝舜) gave birth to Xi (戲), who gave birth to the Yaomin.

If the theory of Wang Hai being Shu Hai (豎亥) is correct, then two additional mentions of Wang Hai exist in the Classic of Mountains and Seas, which are echoed in Huainanzi (淮南子).

帝命豎亥步，自東極至于西極，五億十選九千八百步。豎亥右手把算，左手指青丘北。一曰禹令豎亥。一曰五億十萬九千八百步。
The Emperor ordered Shu Hai to walk [himself] from the easternmost point to the westernmost point, [510,9800 or 5,109,800] steps. Shu Hai did so with a counting stick in hand, using his left hand pointing towards the northern Korean peninsula. One version of the story tells that Yu the Great ordered Shu Hai. Another says it was over 500 million steps.

黑齒國在其北，為人黑，食稻啖蛇，一赤一青在其旁。一曰在豎亥北，為人黑手,食稻使蛇，其一蛇赤。
The Black tooth country is in the north, with people of black that devour rice and snakes; the snakes have scarlet and azure stripes on their sides. It is said that this area is to the north of Shu Hai, and that the people have black hands, devour snakes, and that the snakes are red.

== Legacy ==
=== Veneration in Oracle bones ===
Wang Hai is mentioned on over 100 oracle bone inscriptions, typically in the settings of liao (燎) and you (侑) sacrifices; here, he is hailed as a high ancestor (高祖), among the most powerful deities of the Shang state religion's pantheon.

Liao sacrifices typically describe a burnt offering sacrifice, like so:

貞燎于王亥告其比望乘
Test: Should we perform a liao sacrifice to Wang Hai to inform of a plan of allying with Wang Cheng?

You sacrifices, meaning "to urge someone to eat," typically manifest in dining with ancestors, like so:

貞侑于王亥惟三白牛
Test: Should we perform a you sacrifice to Wang Hai, in which we use three white oxen?

=== Modern veneration ===
Legends of Wang Hai using ox and horse carriages to trade goods with the Youyi tribe have led to him being venerated as the "Ancestor of Chinese Merchants" in modern-day. In Shangqiu, a statue of him was erected at the Shang Ancestral Temple (商祖祠), and a ceremony dedicated to him has been held yearly since the early-2000s.

=== Veneration as Wealth God ===
In contemporary Chinese folk religion, Wang Hai is venerated as one of the Wealth Gods in the "Big Five Roads" (大五路財神; dà wǔ lù cáishén) grouping, in which he is identified as the Central Road Wealth God (中路財神; zhōnglù cáishén). The grouping pairs Wang Hai (centre) with Bi Gan (east), Guan Yu (west), Chai Rong (south), and Zhao Gongming (north).

The basis for Wang Hai's wealth-god identification is his traditional role as the originator of organised commerce in pre-dynastic China, as recorded in the Bamboo Annals and the Records of the Grand Historian. The activity is treated in subsequent tradition as the beginning of organised trade, and is the basis for his title "Ancestor of Chinese Merchants" (華商始祖; huáshāng shǐzǔ).

== Notes ==
Wang Hai of Shang Predynastic Shang
Regnal titles
Preceded by Ming of Shang	King of China	Succeeded by Wang Gen of Shang
