= Ming of Shang =

Ruler of Predynastic Shang

Ming 冥
- Ming 冥 in seal script.

Ruler of Predynastic Shang
- Reign: ? - ?
- Predecessor: Cao Yu
- Successor: Wang Hai
Names
- Family name: Zi (子); Given name: Ming (冥)
Temple name
- Ji (季)
- Father: Cao Yu

Ming
- Chinese: 冥
- Literal meaning: "Darkness"
Transcriptions
Standard Mandarin
- Hanyu Pinyin: míng
- Bopomofo: ㄇㄧㄥˊ
- Wade–Giles: ming^{2}
Yue: Cantonese
- Yale Romanization: ming4
Middle Chinese
- Middle Chinese: meng
Old Chinese
- Baxter–Sagart (2014): /*mˤeŋ/
- Zhengzhang: /*meːŋ/

Alternative Chinese name
- Chinese: 季
- Literal meaning: "youngest brother"
Transcriptions
Standard Mandarin
- Hanyu Pinyin: jì
- Bopomofo: ㄐㄧˋ
Yue: Cantonese
- Yale Romanization: gwai3
Middle Chinese
- Middle Chinese: kjwijH
Old Chinese
- Baxter–Sagart (2014): /*kʷi[t]-s/
- Zhengzhang: /*kʷids/

Ming (冥), family name Zi (子), was the sixth ruler of Predynastic Shang. Wang Guowei identifies him with Ji (季), an ancestor mentioned in oracle bone inscriptions based on patterns in Chu Ci, though consensus has not been reached due to inconclusive evidence.

== Family ==
Ming was a descendant of Xie of Shang, the mythical founder of Predynastic Shang; therefore, he was a descendant of the Yellow Emperor and Emperor Ku. His father was Cao Yu, and he would go on to father Wang Hai and Wang Gen, the former of whom would be revered as a high ancestor (高祖).

== In oracle bone inscriptions ==
In oracular inscriptions, Ming is usually seen as a placename:

丁酉卜𬆩貞來乙巳王入于冥
On the Dingyou day, Que divinates. Test: On the Yisi day, should the king attack (at) Ming?

貞呼去伯于冥
Test: Should we call a minister from Ming?

Should Ji (季) be interpreted as Ming's original name, however, inscriptions show him possibly afflicting the ruler and receiving you sacrifices.

辛亥卜古貞季弗祟王
On the Xinhai day, Gu divinates. Test: Will Ji not afflict the King?

壬申卜旅貞其侑于季惟羊
On the Renshen day, Lǚ divinates. Test: May we make a you sacrifice to Ji? It's a lamb.

== Posthumous accounts ==
=== In the Bamboo Annals ===
In the Bamboo Annals, Ming is mentioned as having been a lord of Shang and worked with Shao Kang of Xia, but died in the Yellow River.

十一年，使商侯冥治河。
In the eleventh year [of Shao Kang's reign], [Shao Kang] ordered Lord Ming of Shang to handle the Yellow River.

Later, during Zhu of Xia's reign, he is reported as having died in the river:

十三年，商侯冥死于河。
In the thirteenth year [of Zhu of Xia's reign], Lord Ming of Shang died in the Yellow River.

=== In Guoyu ===
In Guoyu, a text detailing ancient speeches, Ming is mentioned twice during a speech by Zhan Qin (展禽).

契為司徒而民輯，冥勤其官而水死，湯以寬治民而除其邪，
Xie acted as the Minister of Instruction and brought harmony to the people; Ming did his duty in the waters and died; Tang governed the people and eliminated their evils!

In the second mention, Zhan Qin directly quotes the Book of Rites:

商人禘舜而祖契，郊冥而宗湯；
The Shang offered di 禘 "grand banquet" sacrifices to Di Shun and performed ancestral rites 祖 to Ancestor Xie; they too offered jiao 郊 sacrifices to Ming and paid zong 宗 sacrifices to Tang!

=== In the Chu Ci ===
In the poem Tianmen (天問), Ji is mentioned as being Wang Hai's father, which was used by Wang Guowei as evidence for them being the same person. The poem notably matches with the story of Wang Hai and Wang Gen experiencing trouble at the hands of the Youyi Tribe.

該秉季德厥父是臧
胡終弊於有扈牧夫牛羊
乾協時舞何以懷之
平肋曼膚何以肥之
有扈牧豎云何而逢
擊床先出其命何從

He (Wang Hai) who held to the virtue of Ji (Ming), his father was good.
How then did he come to ruin among the Youhu, a herdsman of oxen and sheep?
When they danced with shields in hand, how did he win their hearts?
With smooth flanks and delicate skin, how was he so sleek?
The Youhu (Youyi), a lowly herdsman—how did they meet?
Attacked first upon his bed—from whom came that command?

恆秉季德焉得夫樸牛
何往營班祿不但還來

Heng, who held to the virtue of Ji—how did he get those draft cattle?
Why did he go to manage the distribution of rewards, not just come back?

== Veneration ==
In the Book of Rites, Ming is documented as being part of a sequence of sacrifices made by the Shang dynasty. He would receive a jiao 郊 sacrifice, a sort of suburban sacrifice made outside of the regular area; Xie would receive a zu 祖 sacrifice, Emperor Ku would receive a di 禘 "grand banquet" sacrifice, and Tang of Shang would receive a zong 宗 sacrifice. This is as opposed to the Youyu-shi doing a jiao sacrifice for Emperor Ku, performing a di sacrifice for the Yellow Emperor, and a zong sacrifice for Emperor Yao. The Zhou dynasty would perform similar sacrifices for Emperor Ku, King Wen of Zhou, and King Wu of Zhou.

Ming of Shang Predynastic Shang
Regnal titles
Preceded by Cao Yu	King of Shang	Succeeded by Wang Hai
