= Wang Gen of Shang =

Predynastic Shang ruler

Wang Gen 王亙
- Gen 亙 in Liushutong script style.

Ruler of Predynastic Shang
- Reign: 12th year — 16th year of Xie of Xia's reign
- Predecessor: Wang Hai
- Successor: Shang Jia
Names
- Family name: Zi (子)
Temple name
- Wang Gen (王亙)
- Father: Ming of Shang

Wang Gen of Shang
- Chinese: 王亙
- Literal meaning: "King Gen"
Transcriptions
Standard Mandarin
- Hanyu Pinyin: wáng gèn
- Bopomofo: ㄨㄤˊ ㄍㄣˋ
- Wade–Giles: wang^{2}-ken^{4}
Yue: Cantonese
- Yale Romanization: wong^{4} gang^{2}
Middle Chinese
- Middle Chinese: hjwang kongH
Old Chinese
- Baxter–Sagart (2014): /*ɢʷaŋ [k]ˤəŋ-s/

Wang Gen, (Note: While many records format the name as Wang Heng 王恆 (héng or gèng), contemporary sources list the name as 王亙.) family name Zi (子), was a ruler of Predynastic Shang, succeeding his brother Wang Hai. His existence is reflected in oracle bone inscriptions. He was succeeded by Shang Jia, Wang Hai's son.

== Names ==
Wang Gen's name is written as ⿰弓亙 (Note: See Heji 14760(.1) and 英國所藏甲骨 01177正.1-3) or 亙 (Note: See Heji 14762.1, 14763, 14764.3, 14766反.0, 14767正.1, 14768.2, and 14769) in oracle bone inscriptions.

Transmitted texts such as the Bamboo Annals list Wang Gen's name as Wang Heng (王恆), which is not attested in oracle bone inscriptions at all. Similar scribal errors can be seen with Wang Hai. Heng 恆 has been used in some transcriptions of Oracle Bones, possibly to align with later accounts, but this does not reflect Wang Gen's identity. (Note: e.g. 先秦甲骨金文簡牘詞彙庫 - 貞勿侑于王恆 (甲骨文合集 Heji 14768.2) and 貞王恆易禦 (英國所藏甲骨01177正.3))

== Posthumous accounts ==
=== In Oracle bone inscriptions ===
Wang Gen is mentioned in scant few oracle bones, much unlike his brother, Wang Hai. Some examples include a you sacrifice and debates as to Wang Gen's trustworthiness. Another text involves whether the sun will come out, but the last character is indecipherable.

Examples include:

貞侑于王亙
Test: Should we do a you sacrifice for Wang Gen?

貞王亙易孚
Test: Has Wang Gen become trustworthy? or Could Wang Gen bestow trustworthiness upon us?

=== In the Bamboo Annals ===
In the Bamboo Annals, Wang Gen is mentioned as having been consulted by his brother Wang Hai regarding what to do with the overproduction of cattle in Shang. In the end, they decide to take the cattle to the neighbouring tribe of the Youyin (modern-day Yi County, Hebei), which would result in Wang Hai's assassination as a result of a love quarrel. He is said to have reigned from the 12th year of Xie of Xia's reign until the 16th year.

== Notes ==
Wang Gen of Shang Predynastic Shang
Regnal titles
Preceded by Wang Hai	King of Shang	Succeeded by Shang Jia
