= Cao Yu of Shang =

Ruler of Predynastic Shang

Cao Yu 曹圉

Ruler of Predynastic Shang
- Reign: ? - ?
- Predecessor: Chang Ruo
- Successor: Ming
Names
- Family name: Zi (子); Given name: Cao Yu (曹圉)
- Father: Chang Ruo

Cao Yu
- Chinese: 曹圉
- Literal meaning: (personal name)
Transcriptions
Standard Mandarin
- Hanyu Pinyin: cáo yǔ
- Bopomofo: ㄘㄠˊ ㄩˇ
- Wade–Giles: ts'ao^{2} yü^{3}
Yue: Cantonese
- Yale Romanization: cou^{4} jyu^{5}
Middle Chinese
- Middle Chinese: dzaw ngjoX
Old Chinese
- Zhengzhang: /*N-tsˤu m-qʰ<r>aʔ/

Cao Yu (曹圉), family name Zi (子), was the fifth ruler of Predynastic Shang. He is not attested in oracle bone inscriptions, only being mentioned in post-Shang texts such as Records of the Grand Historian.

== Family ==
As a ruler of Predynastic Shang, Cao Yu is a descendent of Xie of Shang, the legendary founder of the tribe; this makes him a descendent of Emperor Ku and the Yellow Emperor. His grandfather, Xiang Tu, is recorded as having been a chariot-maker. His son was Ming, who would succeed him after his death.

Cao Yu of Shang Predynastic Shang
Regnal titles
Preceded by Chang Ruo	King of Shang	Succeeded by Ming
