= Battle of Mingtiao =

1600s BCE battle between the Xia and Shang dynasties of China

Battle of Mingtiao 鳴條之戰
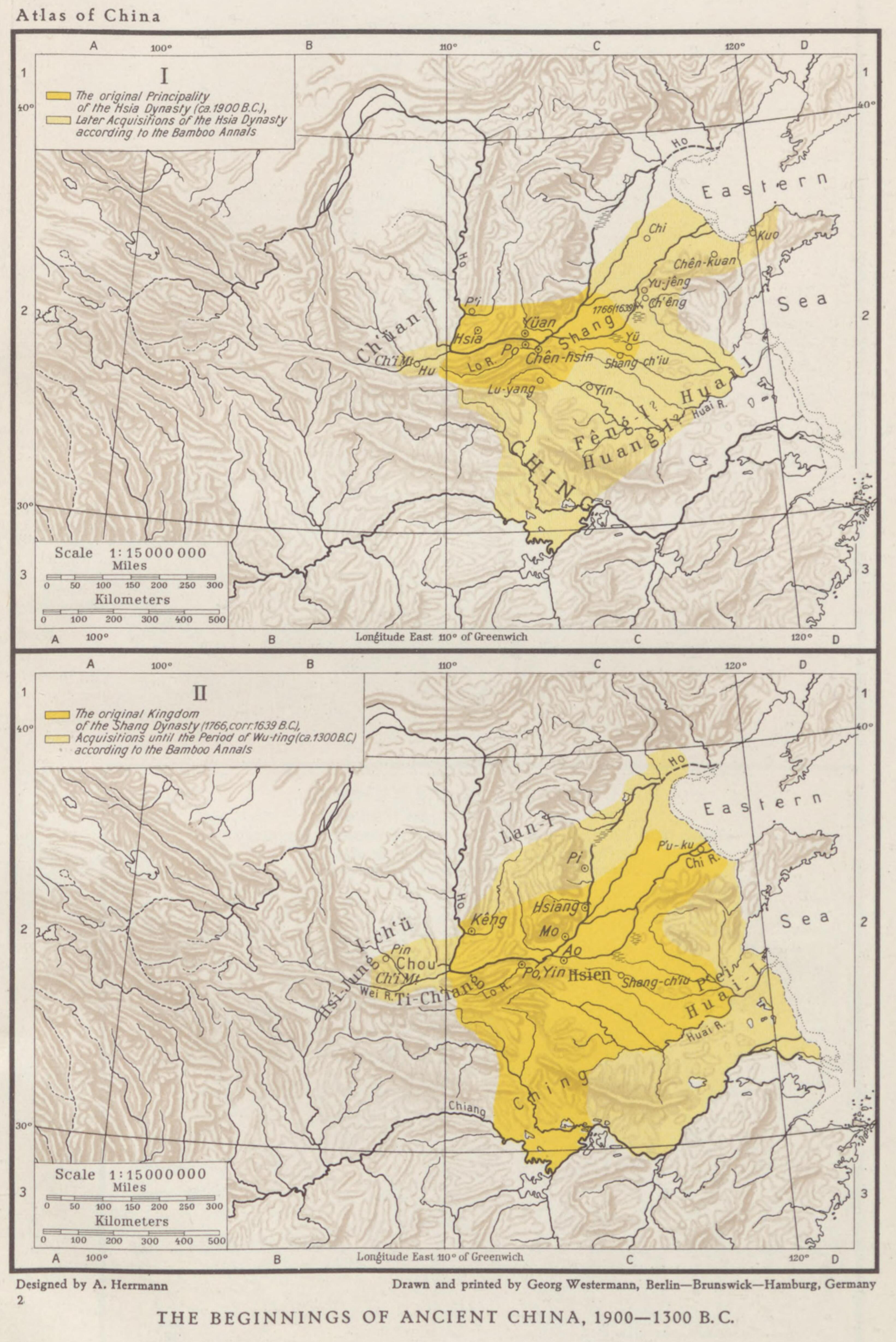
- 1930's illustration of the end of the Xia dynasty and beginning of the Shang dynasty, from The Beginnings of Ancient China, 1900–1300 B.C..
Date	c. 1600 BCE
Location	Mingtiao
Result	Shang victory; Collapse of the Xia dynasty; Rise of the Shang dynasty; Jie exiled to Nanchao (南巢)

Belligerents
Predynastic Shang; Myriad Fang polities (方)	Xia dynasty Kunwu (昆吾); Sanzong (三朡); Dongyi states

Commanders and leaders
Tang of Shang; Yi Yin; Zhong Hui (Note: The extant document is a forgery, but the claim itself predates Mei Ze, so the fact remains Zhong Hui took part here.); Feichang	Jie of Xia

Strength
~6,000 Infantry，70 chariots	Unknown

The Battle of Mingtiao (simplified Chinese: 鸣条之战; traditional Chinese: 鳴條之戰; pinyin: míngtiáo zhī zhàn) was a semi-legendary battle between Predynastic Shang and the Xia dynasty, resulting in a Shang victory that allowed the Lord of Shang (商侯), Tang, to the ascend the throne of China and begin the Shang dynasty.

== Background ==
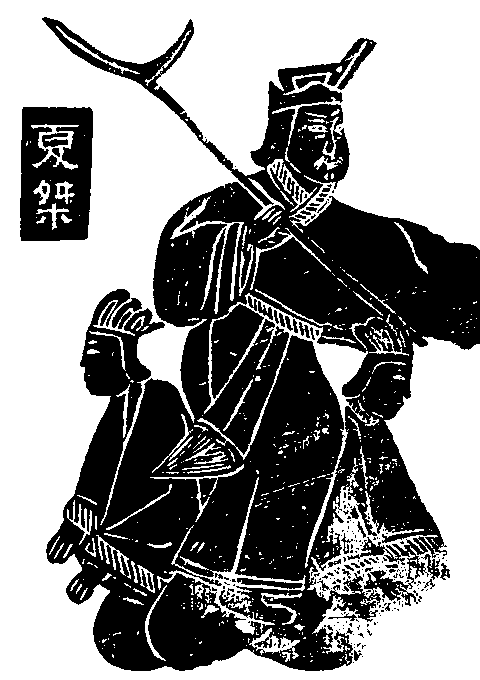
Jie of Xia, from a rubbing of relief from a Wu family shrine, Jiaxiang, Shandong Province, 150 CE, Han dynasty

King Tang of Shang

When the throne of Xia dynasty was passed down to Jie (桀), the power of the Xia clan was dwindling. Jie was generally corrupt and irresponsible. He felt that the original palace was too simple, so he ordered for construction of the Qing Palace (傾宮) "tilt palace." This palace took seven years, large sums of money, and tens of thousands of slaves to build.

Meanwhile, Predynastic Shang was gaining support from neighbouring tribes. Their ancestor, Xie, had worked for Yu the Great and was given the territory of Shang. During Tang of Shang's (湯) reign, thanks to agricultural and trade development from kings like Xiang Tu, Ming, and Wang Hai, the Shang were gaining more and more power. Tang allied with nearby tribes and treated his subjects kindly. He also gained the support of Yi Zhi (伊挚), who was originally the slave of Tang's father-in-law, named Youshen (有莘). When Tang married, Yi Zhi became Tang's chef, and through discussing politics whilst serving food, was made Yi Yin, "Minister Yi" (伊尹).

After years of deliberation with Yi Yin, Tang decided to end the Xia dynasty. He agreed to comply with Jie, but in secret prepared to overthrow him. First, he moved his people to a place named Bo (亳). The area from Bo to the Xia capital was flat, almost without any hills or rivers to stop them. He was also forgiving to his subjects, and was therefore supported by them. The first tribe to be targeted was Ge (葛), which was geographically close to the Shang clan, and did not worship their ancestors on a regular basis. They ate the cattle and sheep which Tang had given them for sacrifices, and killed the children who sent the animals. Tang conquered this tribe during a punitive expedition, under the pretext of avenging a child. Over time, Tang slowly conquered various neighbouring tribes and vassal states to the Xia, including the Youluo (有洛), Jing (荊), Wen (溫), Gu (顧), and, after repeated wars, Kunwu (昆吾). In doing so, Tang was also able to court various allies who could assist Tang in gaining a numbers advantage against Jie's army. Despite this, Jie, did not realise that Tang was a threat to his throne.

Shuo Yuan records that prior to the battle, on the advice of Yi Yin, Tang decided to refrain from paying tribute to Xia. Immediately, Jie assembled the Nine Barbaric Tribes (Note: The Nine Barbaric Tribes are referred to with myriad names. The Latter Book of Han refers to them as the Quanyi (畎夷), Yuyi (于夷), Fangyi (方夷), Huangyi (黃夷), Baiyi (白夷), Chiyi (赤夷), Xuanyi (Xuandu clan) (玄夷、玄都氏), Fengyi (風夷), and Yangyi (陽夷).) of the Dongyi to attack Shang. Tang relented and paid tribute, choosing not to offend Jie any more.

== Battle ==
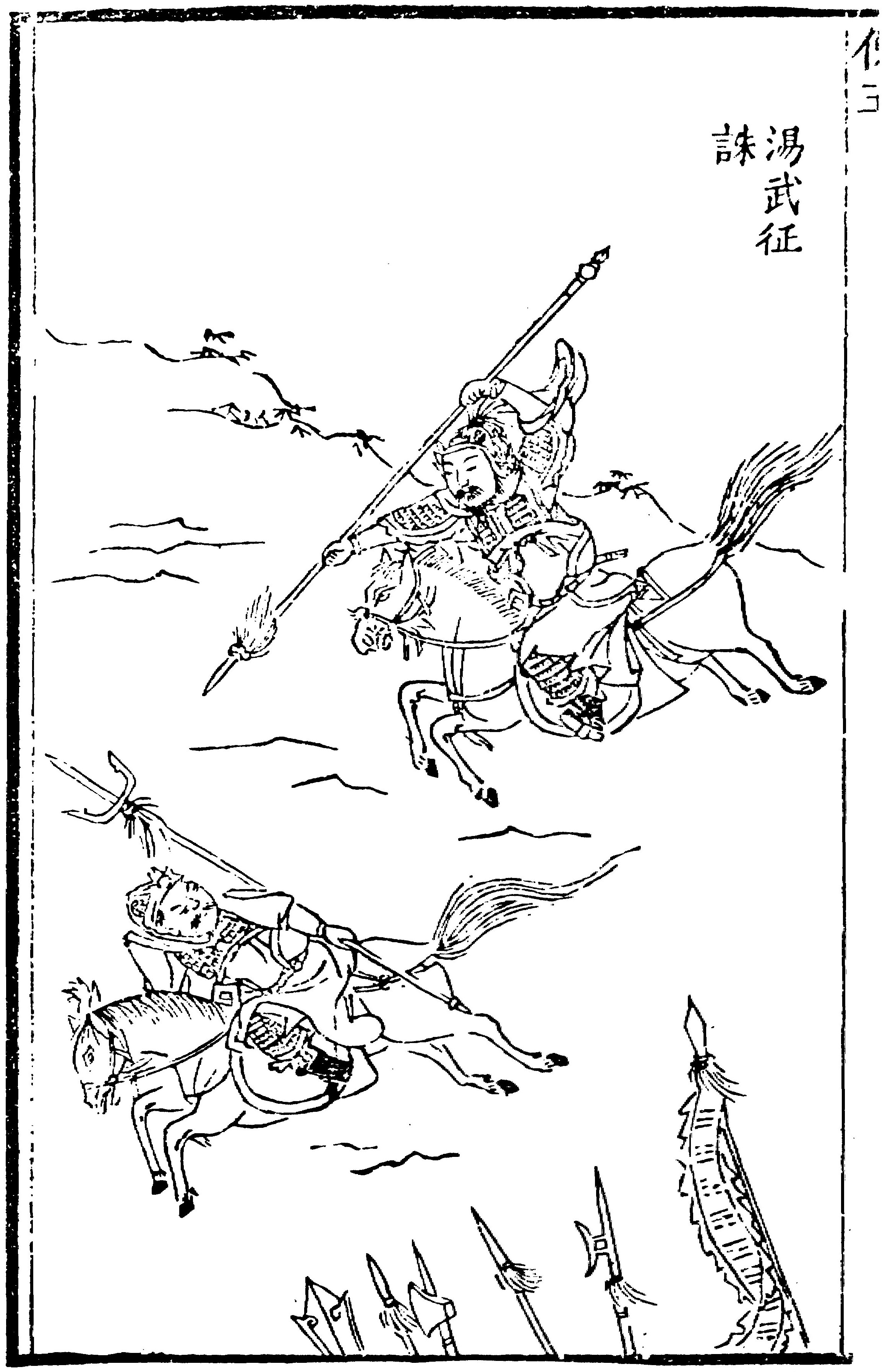
1736 illustration of Tang's punitive expedition.

When a few tribes started rebelling against Xia, Tang of Shang decided that the time had come. He started his attack on Xia. Upon hearing of Tang's rebellion, Jie sent troops from the smaller territories of Gu, Wei, and Kunwu. Yi advised Tang to put off the fight for a year, then conquered Gu and Wei, and defeated Kunwu.

Before the army proceeded any further, Yi Yin told Tang that the army needed a boost in morale. Tang gave a speech, known historically as 'The Oath of Tang', before the two armies met in Mingtiao (present-day Xia County, North Anyi, Xiyun) around 1600 BC. Tang's generals and soldiers all abhorred Jie, so they fought bravely and attacked from Er (陑). Jie's troops, however, did not listen to his commands, either surrendering or fleeing. As a result, the Shang won the battle and drove Jie to Kunwu. After conquering Kunwu, Tang of Shang forced Jie into exile in Nanchao (present day Chao, Anhui). Jie stayed there until his death. Tang then eliminated the remaining Xia forces and used the Xia peasants as slaves.

The Rong Cheng Shi, a Warring States period text first documented in academia in 1994, paints a slightly different picture of the battle, dividing it into three separate instances: First, Jie was defeated in Yousong; then, he was defeated in Mingtiao at Lishan; and finally, he received his ultimate defeat in Nanchao.

== Historicity ==
The historicity of the Xia dynasty itself has been heavily disputed since the Doubting Antiquity School's inception, on the grounds of no direct, testable, archaeological evidence ever coming to light; it is strictly seen in records postdating the Shang dynasty. The Xia have been placed in the Erlitou culture, but with no evidence of literacy, their endonym cannot be ascertained, and it is thus difficult to imprint the Xia onto them beyond geographic evidence.

One of the main questions behind the Battle of Mingtiao is where, from a modern perspective, the battle actually took place. Most sources believe it took place near Xia County (夏县), south of Shanxi. However, there is a lack of archaeological evidence for this beyond analysis of names within the classical texts, and the Rong Cheng Shi noting that three separate battles comprised the Battle of Mingtiao imply it was a war of movement complicates matters. Based on the burial site of Emperor Shun, Lie Hounan (刘俊男) and Wang Fengfu (王丰富) assert that Mingtiao may be an ancient name for Jingzhou (荆州).

== Legacy ==
As Tang of Shang was a nobleman, his revolution is considered the first 'noble revolution' in Chinese history. The Shang dynasty, which he founded, was also the second dynasty in Chinese history.

== See also ==
- Battle of Muye
