= Chang Ruo =

Ruler of Predynastic Shang

Chang Ruo 昌若

Ruler of Predynastic Shang
- Reign: ? - ?
- Predecessor: Xiang Tu
- Successor: Cao Yu of Shang
Names
- Family name: Zi (子); Given name: Chang Ruo (昌若)
- Father: Xiang Tu

Chang Ruo
- Chinese: 昌若
- Literal meaning: (personal name)
Transcriptions
Standard Mandarin
- Hanyu Pinyin: Chāng Ruò
- Wade–Giles: Ch'ang1 Jo4
Wu
- Romanization: ^{1}tshaon 8zaq
Yue: Cantonese
- Yale Romanization: Chēung Yeuk6
Middle Chinese
- Middle Chinese: tsyhang nyak
Old Chinese
- Zhengzhang: /*tʰjaŋ njaɡ/

Chang Ruo (Chinese: 昌若; pinyin: Chāng Ruò) was the fourth ruler of Predynastic Shang. His family name is Zi (子). He is not attested in oracle bone inscriptions at all, only being mentioned in post-Shang texts, particularly Records of the Grand Historian.

== Family ==
His great-grandfather was Xie, the founder of Predynastic Shang and a descendent of Emperor Ku and the Yellow Emperor. His grandfather was Zhao Ming. His father was Xiang Tu, who is recorded as being a chariot-maker. His son was Cao Yu, who would succeed him after his death.

Chang Ruo Predynastic Shang
Regnal titles
Preceded by Xiang Tu	King of Shang	Succeeded by Cao Yu
