= Feichang =

Descendant of Bo Yi and Battle of Mingtiao combatant

- 費昌
- Relatives: Bo Yi (founding ancestor); Lian the Great (great grandfather); Ruomu (great grandfather)
- Military career
- Allegiance: Shang dynasty
- Known for: Descendant of Bo Yi; Serving Tang of Shang
- Conflicts: Battle of Mingtiao

Feichang (simplified Chinese: 费昌; traditional Chinese: 費昌; pinyin: Fèichāng) was a figure in traditional Chinese historiography.

In the Records of the Grand Historian, Sima Qian's account of the origins of the House of Ying state that Feichang was the great-great-grandson of Ruomu, one of the sons of Bo Yi.

Feichang served in the Battle of Mingtiao in Tang of Shang's army. He is recorded as having driven a chariot for Tang, allowing him to defeat Jie of Xia. After his defeat, Jie of Xia was exiled to Nanchao, bringing about the beginning of the Shang dynasty. Taiping Yulan notes Feichang as going to Shang and unifying it prior to the war, after merely asking which was Xia and which was
