= Jiandi =

Jiandi (simplified Chinese: 简狄; traditional Chinese: 簡狄; pinyin: Jiǎndí), also with variants 简易; 簡易 and 简逷; 簡逷, is an important figure in Chinese history and Chinese mythology. She was the second wife of Emperor Ku, who was a descendant of the Yellow Emperor. Jiandi was the mother of Xie (偰), the predynastic founder of the Shang dynasty (Note: Xie's name is also written as 契 whose Mandarin Chinese reflexes are either also Xie or Qi, the latter of which should not be confused with Qi (棄) "abandoned", the birth-name of Houji, son of Ku's first wife Jiang Yuan and predynastic founder of the Zhou dynasty). Her pregnancy miraculously occurred following her swallowing or holding in her bosom the egg of a Xuanniao (玄鳥). Jiandi was said to be of the Yousong clan. Jiandi is mentioned in various sources, including the poems "Eulogy of Shang", in the Shijing, and the "Heavenly Questions" in the Chuci.
