= Miraculous Conception =

Miraculous conception may refer to:

- The Immaculate Conception of Mary, mother of Jesus Christ
- The Virgin Birth of Jesus
- A number of Miraculous birth traditions in history and literature
