= Nüxiu =

Nüxiu may refer to:

- Lady Xiu (女脩), a figure of Chinese mythology who gave birth to Daye, ancestor of the House of Ying, after swallowing the egg of a black bird
- Nü Xiu (女宿), the Mandarin name of the Girl lunar mansion in traditional Chinese astronomy
