= Lady Hua =

Mythical figure

Lady Hua (simplified Chinese: 女华; traditional Chinese: 女華; pinyin: Nǔhuá; lit. 'Lady of the Hua') was a figure in Chinese mythology. In the Records of the Grand Historian, Sima Qian's account of the origin of the House of Ying says that she was the wife of Ye the Great and the mother of Fei the Great, who was later known as Boyi. She is sometimes said to have been the daughter of Shaodian, although her husband and son were very far removed from his generation; it is more likely she was meant as his descendant or the daughter of his people.
