= Ruomu =

Figure in Chinese mythology

Ruomu (Chinese: 若木; pinyin: Ruòmù; lit. 'Treelike') was a figure in Chinese mythology.

In the Records of the Grand Historian, Sima Qian's account of the origins of the House of Ying makes him the second son of Fei the Great (also known as Bo Yi) and the younger brother of Lian the Great. His mother was said to be a 'jade lady of the Yao clan. Ruomu was the great-great-grandfather of Feichang.
