= Lady Xiu =

Figure in Chinese mythology

Lady Xiu 女脩
- Predecessor: Zhuanxu
- Successor: Ye the Great
- Issue: Ye the Great

Lady Xiu (Chinese: 女脩; pinyin: Nǚxiū; lit. 'Lady of Cultivation'), formerly romanized as Lady Hsiu, is a figure in Chinese mythology.

In the Records of the Grand Historian, Sima Qian's account of the origin of the House of Ying states that she became pregnant with Ye the Great after eating the egg of a Xuanniao, sometimes identified as a swallow. This story closely parallels another, told about the origin of the Shang dynasty. Her grandson Fei the Great (later titled Boyi) was reckoned as the ancestor of the ruling houses of Qin and Zhao during the Spring & Autumn and Warring States periods of Chinese history.
