= Xuanniao =

Mythical creature from Predynastic Shang China

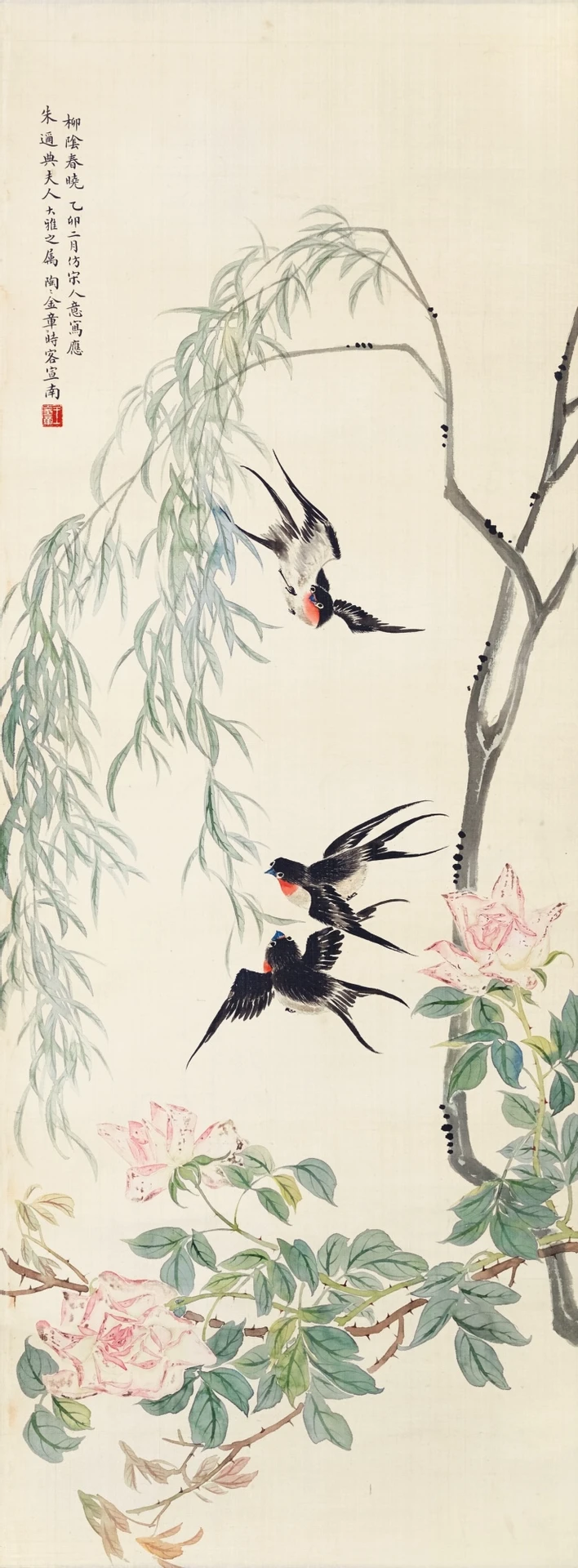
Swallows in the Spring by Jin Zhang, 1915.

Xuanniao (simplified Chinese: 玄鸟; traditional Chinese: 玄鳥; pinyin: Xuánniǎo) is a name given to a Shang dynasty bird in Chinese mythology. It is mentioned in myriad received texts, including the Classic of Poetry, the Book of Rites, Chu Ci, Lüshi Chunqiu and the Classic of Mountains and Seas.

The bird is said to have laid an egg that gave birth to Xie, who would go on to found Predynastic Shang, as well as Ye the Great, who would found the State of Qin. The Ge Tian clan also show connections with the bird through music. Despite extensive mentions in Zhou dynasty texts discussing the Shang dynasty, it is not mentioned in Oracle bones, leaving its role in the Shang state religion unclear.

== Name ==
Xuanniao is the descriptive name given to the bird dating back to the Zhou dynasty and seen in received texts. It is variously translated as "mystical bird," "dark bird," and "xuan bird."

=== Attempted identifications ===
Yàn (燕; "swallow") in oracle bone script.

Shuowen Jiezi identified yàn (燕; "swallow") with Xuanniao, which has been backed up by archaeological findings in Fuyang, as well as etymological findings that see yàn (燕) as etymologically related to yǎn (匽). The latter character which would go on to be clarified as 鶠 with a semantic component. Received texts such as Lüshi Chunqiu have also used the yàn (燕) moniker.

Yan (鶠; "Feng") in seal script.

Chen Mengjia identifies Xuanniao with a male Fenghuang (or simply Feng), a connection Xu Shen made in Shuowen Jiezi in another verse, through his readings of Chu Ci; specifically, Li Sao and Tianwen. Guan Donggui posited a theory that Xuanniao could have been a clipping of yànwū (燕烏; "crow"), which other scholars have echoed. This has been further extrapolated to a possible connection with a genitalia cult, where Xuanniao would be male genitals, and fish female ones. However, these have been disputed on the grounds of a "bird cult" possibly being an illusion brought about by early scholarship.

== In classical texts ==
Xuanniao is mentioned in numerous early texts, which chiefly associate it with Predynastic Shang and other pre-Zhou dynasty cultures.

=== In Records of the Grand Historian ===
The "canonical" view of the myth can be found in Records of the Grand Historian by Sima Qian, which records the Xuanniao as being the founder of Predynastic Shang.

殷契，母曰簡狄，有娀氏之女，為帝嚳次妃。三人行浴，見玄鳥墮其卵，簡狄取吞之，因孕生契。契長而佐禹治水有功。

Xie of Yin's mother was named Jiandi. She was a woman of the Yousong clan and consort of Emperor Ku. Amongst three other people, she went to bathe, and in there saw a Xuanniao drop its egg. Jiandi took the egg and swallowed it, and then became pregnant with Xie. As Xie grew older, he would go on to help Yu the Great control the floods.

This story is seen in numerous texts, such as the Classic of Poetry and Biographies of Exemplary Women. Therefore, the source Sima Qian used is unknown.

Additionally, the Qin dynasty is also said to have claimed ancestry in the same text:

秦之先，帝顓頊之苗裔孫曰女修。女修織，玄鳥隕卵，女修吞之，生子大業。

In the beginning of the State of Qin, Emperor Zhuanxu's progenitor's granddaughter was named Nüxiu. As she was weaving cloth, Xuanniao dropped an egg, and so Ye the Great was born.

=== In the Classic of Poetry ===
This fu-style piece describes the standard myth of giving Jiandi giving birth to Xie through the egg gifted by Xuanniao. Comparisons have been drawn between the poem and the myth of Yu the Great being birthed from a back rib torn out of his mother.

天命玄鳥、降而生商、宅殷土芒芒。
古帝命武湯、正域彼四方。

Translation:

Heaven commissioned the swallow,
To descend and give birth to [the father of our] Shang.

— James Legge translation

=== In Chu Ci ===
==== Allusions to Xie ====
Heavenly Questions (天問) makes clear allusions to the legend of Xie's birth, the founding myth of Predynastic Shang, mirroring the account given in Records of the Grand Historian and the Classic of Poetry.

簡狄在台嚳何宜
玄鳥致貽女何喜

Translation:

Jiandi dwelt in the tower, why did Emperor Ku find her suitable?
Xuanniao bequeathed her a gift, how did she find joy?

Thinking of the Beautiful One (思美人) refers to the same legend, alluding to Jiandi's receiving of the egg.

因歸鳥而致辭兮，羌迅高而難當。
高辛之靈盛兮，遭玄鳥而致詒。
欲變節以從俗兮，媿易初而屈志。

Translation:

I wished to send my message by the homeward-bound bird,
But it flies so swiftly and high that my plea goes unheard.
Yet the wise and virtuous Gaoxin [Emperor Ku] of old,
Met the Xuanniao and received its promise to hold.

==== In Accumulated Blossoms ====
Unlike the other two poems, Accumulated Blossoms (蓄英) treats Xuanniao as a strictly scenic bird, not using it to specifically reference the birth of Xie, and instead alluding to its spiritual origins.

微霜兮眇眇，病殀兮鳴蜩。
玄鳥兮辭歸，飛翔兮靈丘。

Translation:

Light frost spreads faint and far;
Sickly and dying, the cicadas whir.
The Xuanniao takes its leave, returning home,
Soaring and hovering over the Spirit Mound.

=== In Lüshi Chunqiu ===
In Lüshi Chunqiu, the Xuanniao appears strictly in the "Almanac" (紀) sections.

In the Second Month Almanac (二月紀), the Xuanniao is mentioned preceding a significant taolao sacrifice being made to Gao Mei, a goddess of fertility, thus alluding to other classics that link the Xuanniao with fertility.

是月也，玄鳥至。至之日，以太牢祀於高禖。天子親往，后妃率九嬪御，乃禮天子所御，帶以弓韣，授以弓矢於高禖之前。

This month, the Xuanniao arrived. On this day, a sacrifice of an ox, goat, and pig (tailao) was made to Gao Mei. The emperor went in person, accompanied by the empress and nine concubines. They paid homage to the emperor's entourage, who wore bows and saddles and presented them with bows and arrows before the Gao Mei.

In the Midsummer Almanac (仲夏紀), Xuanniao is mentioned as the second song sang by the Ge Tian Clan (葛天氏).

昔葛天氏之樂，三人操牛尾投足以歌八闋：一曰載民，二曰玄鳥，三曰遂草木，四曰奮五穀，五曰敬天常，六曰達帝功，七曰依地德，八曰總萬物之極。

In the past, the Ge Tian clan's music would have three people take oxtails and stamp around singing eight songs. The first is called Carrying the People, the second is called Xuanniao, the third is called Following the Grass and Trees, the fourth is called Striving for the Five Grains, the fifth is called Paying Reverence to Heaven's Constants, the sixth is called Achieving the Thearch's Merit, the seventh is called Relying on the Innate Power of the Earth, and the eighth is called Combining the Ultimate of All Things.

In the Mid-Autumn Almanac (仲秋紀), Xuanniao is mentioned as returning during the Mid-Autumn Month as it is defined by Lü Buwei.

日在角，昏牽牛中，旦觜嶲中。其日庚辛。其帝少皞。其神蓐收。其蟲毛。其音商。律中南呂。其數九。其味辛。其臭腥。其祀門。祭先肝。涼風生。候鳥來。玄鳥歸。群鳥養羞。天子居總章太廟，乘戎路，駕白駱，載白旂，衣白衣，服白玉，食麻與犬。其器廉以深。

The Sun is in the Horn (Spica); at dusk the Ox (Aquila) culminates, at dawn the Beak (Orion) culminates. Its days are geng 庚 and xin 辛. Its deity is Shaohao. Its spirit is Rushou. Its creatures are the hairy ones. Its yin 音 is Shang. Its pitch standard is Nanlü 南呂. Its number is nine. Its flavors are pungent. Its smells are rank. Its sacrifice is to the Gate; the offering is first to the liver. Cool winds arise; migrant birds arrive; the Xuanniao returns; flocks of birds store up provisions. The Son of Heaven resides in the Grand Temple of the General Hall, rides in the battle chariot, yokes a white horse, displays a white banner, wears white robes, wears white jade, and eats hemp seeds and dog meat. His vessels are angular and deep.

=== In the Classic of Mountains and Seas ===
The Xuanniao is mentioned twice in the Classic of Mountains and Seas, an ancient atlas known for featuring strangely-described creatures.

At the time of writing the classic, the Fenghuang was considered two separate entities, the male Feng 鳳 and female Huang 凰 respectively. The Northern Great Wilderness chapter of the Classic of Mountains and Seas notably distinguishes the Xuanniao from the Huang, using them separately when listing creatures found in two mountains, mentioned in completely different parts of the list. Whether this implies the Xuanniao is a Feng or a distinct entity, however, is unclear.

東北海之外，大荒之中，河水之間，附禺之山，帝顓頊與九嬪葬焉。爰有𩿨久、文貝、離俞、鸞鳥、凰鳥、大物、小物。有青鳥、琅鳥、玄鳥、[...] 皆出衛於山。

Beyond the northeastern sea, in the midst of the Great Wilderness, between the Yellow River's waters, stands Fuyu Mountain. There Emperor Zhuanxu and his nine consorts are buried. Following this, in this area, Qiujiu (bird name), patterned shells, Liyu, Luanniao [simorgh-like bird], female Fenghuang (huangniao), and big and small things appear. There are also qingniao (messengers of the Queen Mother of the West), langniao, Xuanniao [...] which all emerge to guard this mountain.

Meanwhile, the Inner Sea chapter mentions it as residing at the source of a certain river:

北海之內，有山，名曰幽都之山，黑水出焉。其上有玄鳥、

In the northern oceans, there is a mountain named Youdou Mountain; the Black River's source is here. At the summit lies Xuanniao...

== In excavated texts ==
A Mawangdui silk manuscript titled Xingde 刑德 notes that Xuanniao was venerated as a military deity.

== Possible veneration ==
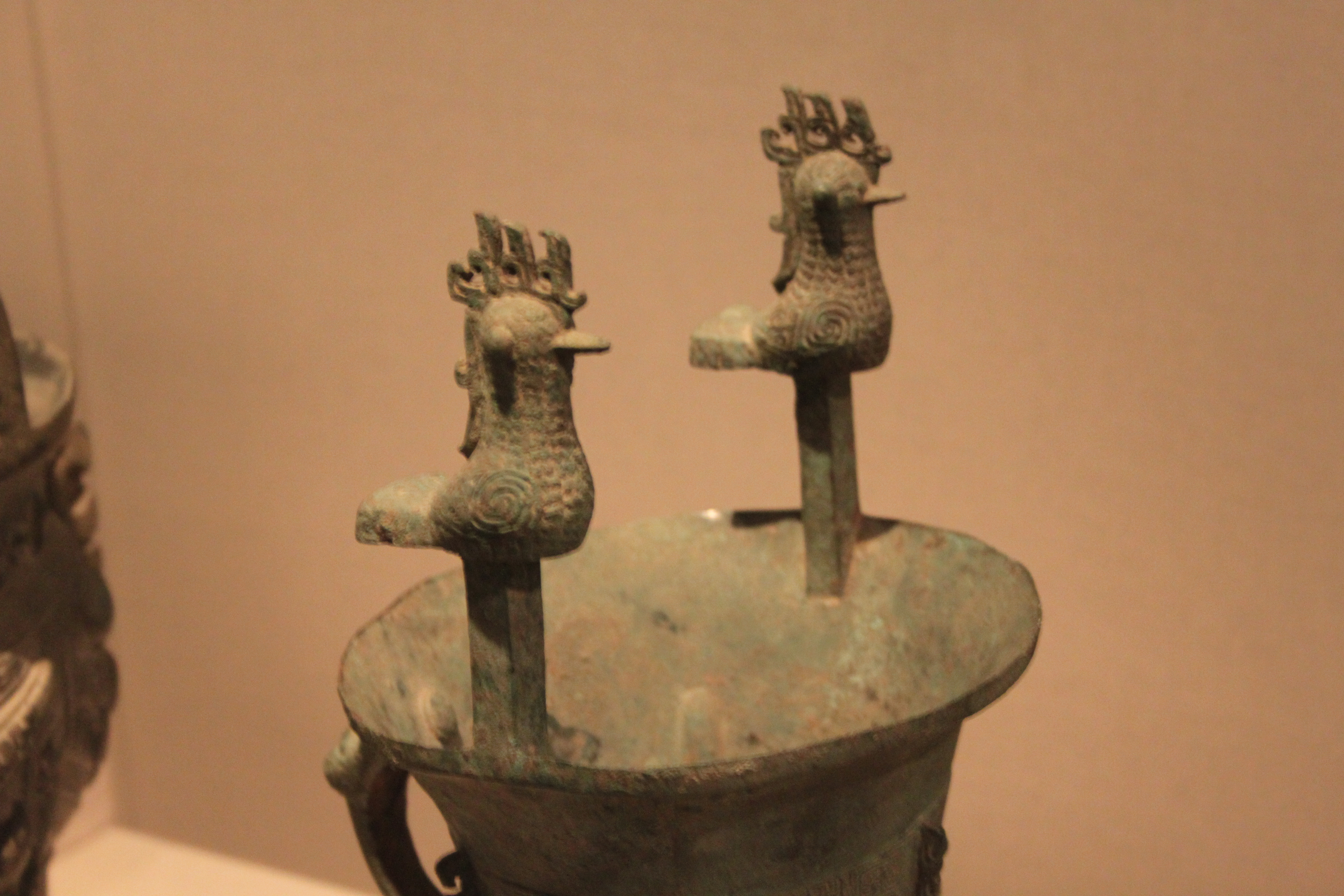
Late Shang bronze jia with two birds on it.

While the founding myth of Predynastic Shang is recorded in Zhou dynasty texts, whether the ancient Shang people mentioned by them actually venerated the bird is unclear, mainly due to a lack of contemporary texts. The Zhou texts in question were written centuries after the Battle of Muye that ended the Late Shang. Archaeological finds have given some signs of a "bird cult," given ample iconography of owls and swallows in jade and bronze artifacts, sometimes with Taotie forming the face. This has led to a broader theory of Shang birds being a central component of totemic iconography, particularly drawing upon the Shang odes in the Classic of Poetry as evidence when viewed in the light of Shang dynasty jade and bronze artifacts. Additionally, Wang Hai appears to have been worshipped as a bird. However, oracle bones do not reflect any sacrifices being made to any specific bird deity, nor is Xuanniao mentioned, at least by the same name given by the Zhou writers who recount the myth. Therefore, all scholarship on the topic is forced to synthesise Zhou dynasty retellings with Shang archaeology.
