= Ye the Great =

Figure in Chinese mythology; father of Boyi

Da Ye 大業
- Predecessor: Lady Xiu
- Successor: Fei the Great
- Issue: Fei the Great
- Mother: Lady Xiu

Ye or Yeh the Great (simplified Chinese: 大业; traditional Chinese: 大業; pinyin: Dàyè; lit. 'Great Undertaking', 'Enterprise', 'or Cause') was a figure in Chinese mythology.

In the Records of the Grand Historian, Sima Qian's account of the origin of the House of Ying made him the son of Lady Xiu and the egg of a Xuanniao. He was said to have been the father of Fei the Great, who later became known as Boyi, by the Lady Hua.

Some Chinese scholars have argued that his name was a title or epithet of Gao Yao, who served under Emperor Shun and was counted as the ancestor of some Li and Zhou families.
