= Xie of Shang =

Founder of Predynastic Shang

Xie 契
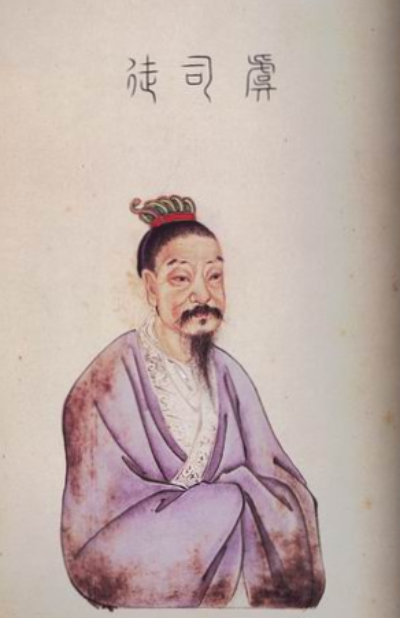
- Qing dynasty illustration

Ruler of Predynastic Shang
- Reign: c. 2070 B.C. – ? BC
- Predecessor: Emperor Ku
- Successor: Zhao Ming
- Issue: Zhao Ming
Names
- Family name: Zi (子); Given name: Xie (契 or 偰); Alternate name: E Bo (閼伯)
- Father: Emperor Ku
- Mother: Jian Di

Xie of Shang
- Chinese: 契 or 偰
Transcriptions
Standard Mandarin
- Hanyu Pinyin: xiè
- Bopomofo: ㄒㄧㄝˋ
- Wade–Giles: hsieh^{4}
Middle Chinese
- Middle Chinese: set
Old Chinese
- Zhengzhang: /*sqʰeːd/

Alternative Chinese name
- Chinese: 閼伯
Transcriptions
Standard Mandarin
- Hanyu Pinyin: è bó
- Bopomofo: ㄜˋ ㄅㄛˊ
- Wade–Giles: o^{4}-po^{2}
Middle Chinese
- Middle Chinese: 'en paek
Old Chinese
- Baxter–Sagart (2014): /*qˤat pˤrak/
- Zhengzhang: /*qeːn praːɡ/

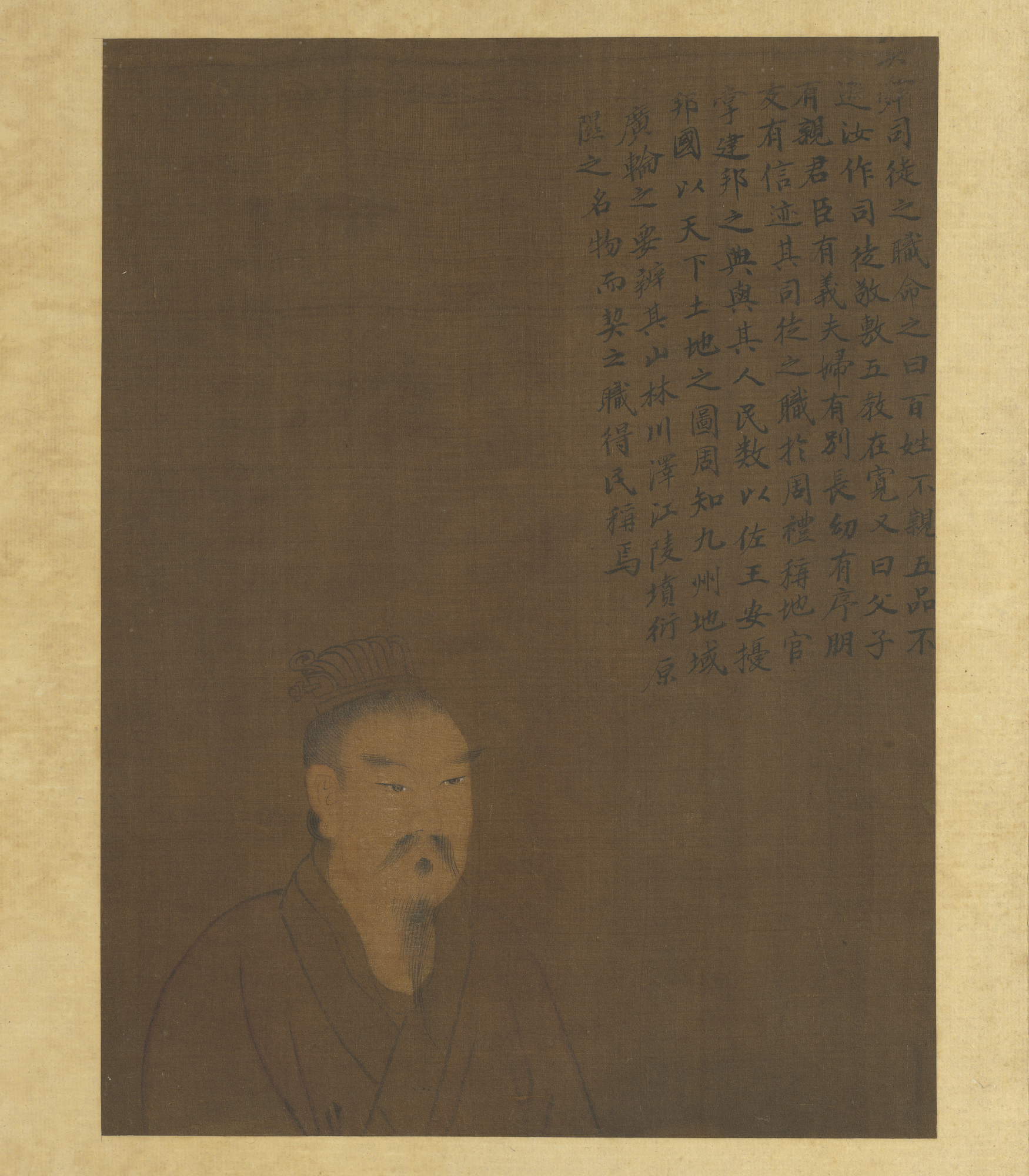
Portrait of Xie (National Palace Museum)

Xie (Chinese: 契) (Note: Sometimes pronounced as Qi, also written as (Chinese: 偰)) family name Zi (子), was an ancient Chinese nobleman and ancestor of the kings of the Shang dynasty. He is the first known Shang ancestor and ruler of the Predynastic Shang. However, he is only mentioned in texts from after the Shang dynasty: He is not attested in oracle bone inscriptions.

== Names ==
In Records of the Grand Historian, he is given the family name Zi (子), matching those of Shang rulers in oracle bone inscriptions. In Guoyu, he is referred to by a leader of the State of Lu as the "Dark King" (玄王), referring to a legend in which he was born from a Xuanniao to found Predynastic Shang.

Later generations post-Zhou refer to Xie as E Bo (閼伯). Additionally, some transmitted texts will use the character (偰) for his name, which clarifies the reading as xie.

== Family ==
Xie's consort(s) is unknown, but it is known he was a father of Zhao Ming of Shang and grandfather of Xiang Tu.

Xie's father was Emperor Ku, and Xie's brothers were Houji, Emperor Zhi and Emperor Yao. Xie's mother was one of Ku's consorts ‒ Jiang Yuan, Jiandi, Qingdu, or Changyi.

== Reign ==
Xie allegedly served as Minister of Instruction (司徒) under Emperor Shun during the Three Sovereigns and Five Emperors period, who said the following:

帝舜乃命契曰：「百姓不親，五品不訓，汝為司徒而敬敷五教，五教在寬。」

Emperor Shun gave the order to Xie, saying: "The people are wanting in affection for one another, and do not observe the five orders of relationship. You, as Minister of Instruction, should reverently inculcate the lessons of duty belonging to those five orders, but do so with gentleness."

As Minister of Instruction, Xie was tasked with upholding the five teachings (五品 or 五教). While these were not mentioned in Sima Qian's records, they are attested in other texts. In Zuo Zhuan, specifically the 18th Year of Duke Wen, Zuo Qiuming states they are the following:

1. 父義 - Righteousness and justice in the father.
2. 母慈 - Kindness in the mother.
3. 兄友 - Friendliness in the older brother.
4. 弟恭 - Respect in the younger brother.
5. 子孝 - Filial conduct in the son.

Additionally, as Minister of Instruction, Xie was enfeoffed with the Principality of Shang, which flourished under the rule of Emperor Yao and Emperor Shun.

After he died, Xie was succeeded by his son, Zhao Ming.

== Xuanniao myth ==
Xie is said to have been born as a result of Jian Di, the daughter of Yousong (有娀) and one of three sisters, consuming an egg from a Xuanniao (玄鳥). After consuming the egg, Jian Di became pregnant with Qi, gave birth to him, and raised him. When he grew up, he became the Minister of Instruction of Emperor Shun.

The myth of the Xuanniao is mentioned in an eponymous myth amongst the Sacrificial Odes of Shang (商頌) in the Classic of Poetry, opening as follows:

天命玄鳥，降而生商，宅殷土芒芒。

Heaven ordained a Xuanniao, which descended upon and birthed the Shang, settling in our desolate yet vast land of Yin.

== Great flood myth ==
Much of what is known about Xie comes from the Great flood involving Yu the Great, mentioned in myriad works after the Shang dynasty fell, most predominantly Records of the Grand Historian by Sima Qian. However, as there is little archaeological evidence for the flood as described, and the closest thing to the Xia dynasty it is associated with is the Erlitou culture, the story's legitimacy is questionable.

In the 20th year of Emperor Yao's reign, the Yellow River blew its banks, causing a massive flood that engulfed much of China, swelling over hills and forcing the common man to flee to higher ground. Yao sought individuals who could assist with the flood. Gun failed, and so the task fell to Yu the Great, his son. He succeeded, and so Emperor Yao offered him office; he wanted to refuse in favour of either Xie, Hou Ji, or Gao Yao, but Yao was set and told him to attend to his duties.

== Notes ==
Xie of Shang Predynastic Shang
Regnal titles
| New title | King of Shang | Succeeded by Zhao Ming |
