= Zhao Ming of Shang =

Ruler of Predynastic Shang

Zhaoming 昭明

Ruler of Predynastic Shang
- Reign: ? - ?
- Predecessor: Xie of Shang
- Successor: Xiang Tu
Names
- Family name: Zi (子); Given name: Zhaoming (昭明)
- Father: Xie of Shang

Zhaoming
- Chinese: 昭明
- Literal meaning: (personal name)
Transcriptions
Standard Mandarin
- Hanyu Pinyin: Zhāomíng
- Wade–Giles: Chao1 Ming2
Wu
- Romanization: ^{1}tsau 6men
Yue: Cantonese
- Yale Romanization: ciu^{1} ming^{4}
Middle Chinese
- Middle Chinese: tsyew mjaeng
Old Chinese
- Baxter–Sagart (2014): /*taw mraŋ/
- Zhengzhang: /*tjew mraŋ/

Zhaoming (Chinese: 昭明; pinyin: Zhāomíng; ? – ?) was a ruler of Predynastic Shang. His family name was Zi (子).

== Succession ==
His father was Xie of Shang, born in Shangqiu (商丘), Henan (河南). He is thus a descendent of the Yellow Emperor and Emperor Ku, and among the twelve ancestors of the King Tang of Shang. He was succeeded by Xiang Tu.

== In Chu Ci ==
In Chu Ci (楚辭), Zhaoming is described as being ordered to open the gates by Zhurong, a descendent of the Flame Emperor.

使祝融兮先行，令昭明兮開門。
I command Zhu Rong to lead the way, and order Zhaoming to open the gates.

== Existence ==
Zhaoming (昭明), as a name, is highly unusual in the classical period, and traditionally means "luminous" or to "become bright," which was reflected in James Legge's translation of Records of the Grand Historian.

Attempts to find correlation between Zhaoming and oracle bones have been made ever since the rise of the Doubting Antiquity School; however, in no known oracle bone inscription does any Late Shang individual venerate anyone named Zhaoming. Despite this setback, in the cases of rulers such as Ming or Wang Hai, this research has been successful. In 1935, Jin Xiangtong (金相同) attempted to draw equivalence between the characters gao 羔 and yue 岳, using evidence from the Zuo Zhuan dubbing him E Bo (閼伯), but as this theory was founded in modern pronunciation, the claim was lacking. Furthermore, the Zuo Zhuan evidence is usually associated with Xie. In 1940, Ding Shan (丁山) found equivalence with Jiong 囧, but further research by Jiang Linchang (江林昌) found that this was more than likely a placename, observing structures such as south Jiong 南囧. In 1985, Zheng Huisheng (鄭慧生) observed that the name could possibly result from a misinterpretation from the Book of Yao 堯典:

百姓昭明協和萬邦

The quote bears similar syntax to "昭明相土昌若曹圉" whilst using Zhaoming's name in its adjectival sense. The syntax can be interpreted either as a genealogy, or as an ancient idiom along the lines of Illustrious are the [people], united by the same earth and singing in harmony across borders.

Therefore, should Zheng's theory be correct, structures such as the following show in Xunzi's Cheng Xiang 成相 chapter would illustrate that misinterpretation:

契玄王，生昭明

This text can be interpreted as either "Xie, the Dark King, birthed Zhaoming." or "Xie, the Dark King, was born luminous." As Classical Chinese traditionally places an object after the verb, sheng 生 was interpreted as a genealogy, common in annalistic works.

Zhao Ming of Shang Predynastic Shang
Regnal titles
Preceded by Xie	King of Shang	Succeeded by Xiang Tu
