= Emperor Zhi =

Mythological emperor of ancient China

Zhi 摯
- Reign: 2366–2358 BC
- Predecessor: Emperor Ku
- Successor: Emperor Yao

Emperor Zhi (simplified Chinese: 帝挚; traditional Chinese: 帝摯, Dì Zhì; fl. c. 2366 – c. 2358 BC) was a legendary emperor of ancient China.

== Legend ==
Zhi is recorded as one of the quasi historical prehistoric rulers of ancient China between the mythological era of the Three Sovereigns and Five Emperors and the historical Zhou. His title di is usually translated into English as emperor but was shared by Shangdi, the "high god" of the earliest known Chinese writing. Much later Chinese historians like Sima Qian reported the surviving accounts that Zhi was a son of Emperor Ku, succeeding him for nine years roughly placed between 2366 and 2358 BC.

The Annals of the Five Emperors in Sima Qian's Records of the Grand Historian say that Zhi reigned badly, but was succeeded by his younger half-brother Fang Xun, who as King Yao became proverbial for the wisdom and success of his rule.

According to the Bamboo Annals, written earlier but rediscovered later, a descendant of Shennong named Shu Qi had attempted to rebel upon the death of the Emperor Zhuanxu. Gao Xin prince of Xin, another descendant of the Yellow Emperor, defeated him and established himself as Emperor Ku. In the 45th year of Ku's reign, he named his son Prince Yao of Tang as his successor, but upon his death in the 63rd year of his reign, Zhi the older son of Ku took the throne instead. The Bamboo Annals agree that Zhi ruled for nine years, and that he was then deposed and replaced by his brother Yao.

== See also ==
- Chinese mythology

Emperor Zhi Three Sovereigns and Five Emperors
Regnal titles
Preceded by Ku	Emperor of China	Succeeded by Yao
