= Rong Cheng Shi =

The Rong Cheng Shi (Chinese: 容成氏; pinyin: Róng Chéng shì) is an ancient bamboo manuscript from the Chinese Warring States period (ca. 453–221 BCE) that was discovered and purchased on Hong Kong's antiquity market in 1994. It is now kept at the Shanghai Museum. It was published in the second volume of the Shanghai Bowuguan can Zhanguo Chu jian shu 上海博物館藏戰國楚竹書. Like the entire collection, it is dated to the mid through late 4th century BCE.

To date, it is the only historical narrative from that runs from ancient times to the beginning of the Zhou dynasty. It addresses abdication as an ideal way of ruling, and describes history as devolutionary. It also contains among the earliest descriptions of the Nine Provinces allegedly divided by Yu the Great.
