= Bo Yi (legendary leader) =

Bo Yi 伯益
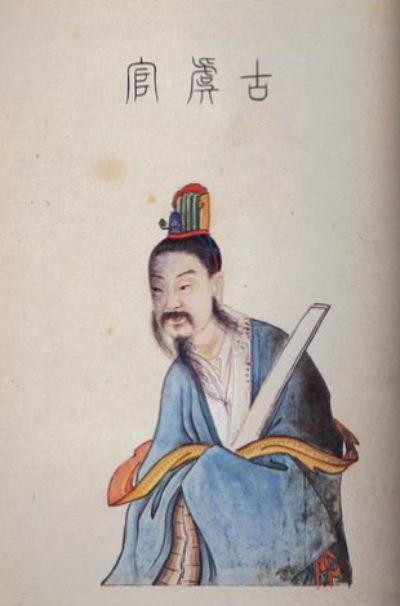
- Qing dynasty illustration
- Predecessor: Ye the Great
- Successor: Lian the Great
- Issue: Lian the Great; Ruomu
Posthumous name
- Emperor Qide Zunsheng 齊德尊聖皇帝 (honored by Wu Zetian)
- Father: Ye the Great
- Mother: Lady Hua

Yi (Chinese: 益; pinyin: Yì; fl. 2nd millennium BCE) was a tribal leader of Longshan culture and a culture hero in Chinese mythology who helped Shun and Yu the Great control the Great Flood; he served afterwards as a government minister and a successor as ruler of the empire. Yi is also credited with the invention of digging wells (although Shennong is also credited with this). He was the ancestor of the ruling houses of the Zhao, Qin, Xu and Liang states.

== Names ==
Yi was also known as Boyi or Bo Yi, written variously as 伯益, 伯夷, 伯翳, and 柏翳. He was also known as Fei the Great (大費, Dafei).

== History ==
In the Records of the Grand Historian, Sima Qian's account of the origins of the House of Ying states that Fei the Great was the son of Ye the Great and Lady Hua. His father is given as Gao Yao, but this seems to have been a mistake of various scholars in reading the original sources.

He was eventually titled Boyi or Count Yi. Yi was appointed by Shun to assist in controlling the great flood through the controlled burn use of fire to clear the land forests, overgrowth, and marshes; and, also, to provide meat to feed the workers involved in the disaster management effort: he thus became a close companion of Yu, with whom he worked closely for thirteen years in this effort.

Then, after the successful struggle against the flood, and the subsequent reorganization of government, Yi was appointed Minister of Animal Husbandry. According to the more mythical accounts, Yi could domesticate animals and birds due to knowing their languages.

Alternately, Yi is credited by creation of the canon of laws, while his relationship to the flood quelling is not underlined. This presentation is provided in the "Lü xing" 呂刑 chapter of the Book of Documents, where he is listed together with Yu the Great and Houji as "three princes" 三后.

After the succession of Yu as sole emperor, Yu initially designated Yi as his successor, in preference to his son Qi. Versions vary as to whether Yu later changed his mind or if instead Yi was killed in the course of a struggle for the throne, as well as to whether Yi ever served as emperor. According to Sima Qian, Boyi's children by a 'jade lady of the Yao' included Lian the Great and Ruomu. According to the Bamboo Annals, a temple (祠) was made for him after he died during the 6th year of Qi.

== Descendants ==
His son Ruomu was appointed lord of Xu in approximately 2061 BC by King Qi of Xia. Yi was believed to be the ancestor of Zhao clan and Qin clan as well. The state of Zhao and Qin were ruled by the two clans respectively. Descendants of Zhao clan were known as Zhao clan of Tianshui. Qin Shi Huang was one of his descendant from Qin clan. Other Ying clansmen, descended from Ruomu, formed Pei clan of Hedong.

== See also ==
- House of Ying
- House of Zhao
- Great Flood (China)
- Shun (Chinese leader)
