= Miraculous birth =

Conceptions and births by miraculous circumstances

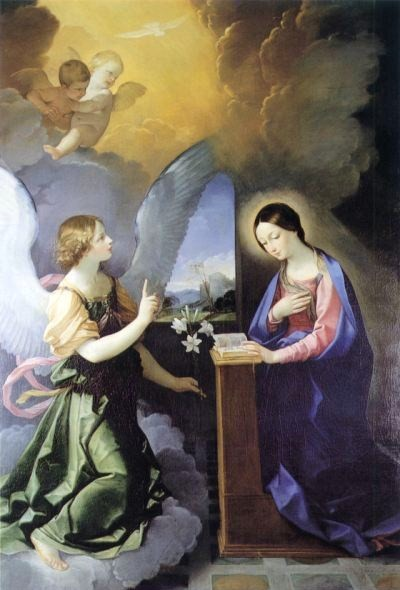
The Annunciation by Guido Reni (1621)

Miraculous births are a common theme in mythological, religious and legendary narratives and traditions. They often include conceptions by miraculous circumstances and features such as intervention by a deity, supernatural elements, astronomical signs, hardship or, in the case of some mythologies, complex plots related to creation.

== Ancient Mesopotamia ==
The Assyrian and Babylonian concept of origins expressed procreation first in "relationships between gods and goddesses resulting in other gods and goddesses", such as Ea and Damkina assisted by Apsu giving birth to Marduk. The Akkadian Enûma Eliš describes the birth of Marduk as him being created in the heart of Apsu, being begotten by his father Ea and conceived by his mother Damkina.

According to Norman Lockyer, Ea, Ia, or Oannes was the primal god of Babylon. He was a ‘Great God, Maker of Men, Potter, Artist and Workman.’ He formed a Triad with Anu and Bil—the two poles of heaven and the equator. Oannes first appeared from the sea to teach the Babylonians the art of writing, sciences and crafts, the building of cities, the surveying of land, the observation of the stars, and the sowing and harvesting of all kinds of grains and plants. He was believed to have been reincarnated several times. Berossos, priest of the Temple of Bel, in Babylon, knew of as many as six such reincarnations.

In addition, "procreative deities, either male or female, played a part in the birth of other deities or great personages, such as the Ugaritic tradition of Lady Asherah, 'the Progenitress of the gods'; Mami, 'the Mother-womb, the one who creates mankind'; Father Nanna, the 'begetter of gods and men'; the Assyrian traditions that Tukulti-Urta was created by the gods in the womb of his mother and that Sennacherib's birth was assisted by Ea, who provided a 'spacious womb', and Assur, 'the god, my begetter'; and the North Arabian myth of the mother goddess who was responsible for Dusares."

In Hittite mythology, the god Anu was overthrown by his cupbearer Kumarbi; Anu attempted to flee, but Kumarbi bit off Anu's genitals and swallowed them, and banished him to the underworld. As a consequence of swallowing Anu's genitals, Kumarbi became impregnated with Anu's son Teshub and four other offspring. Teshub overthrew his father Kumarbi, thus avenging his other father Anu's overthrow and mutilation. This account later became the basis for the Greek story of Uranus's castration by his son Cronus, resulting in the birth of Aphrodite, described in Hesiod's Theogony.

== Ancient Egypt ==
=== Gods ===
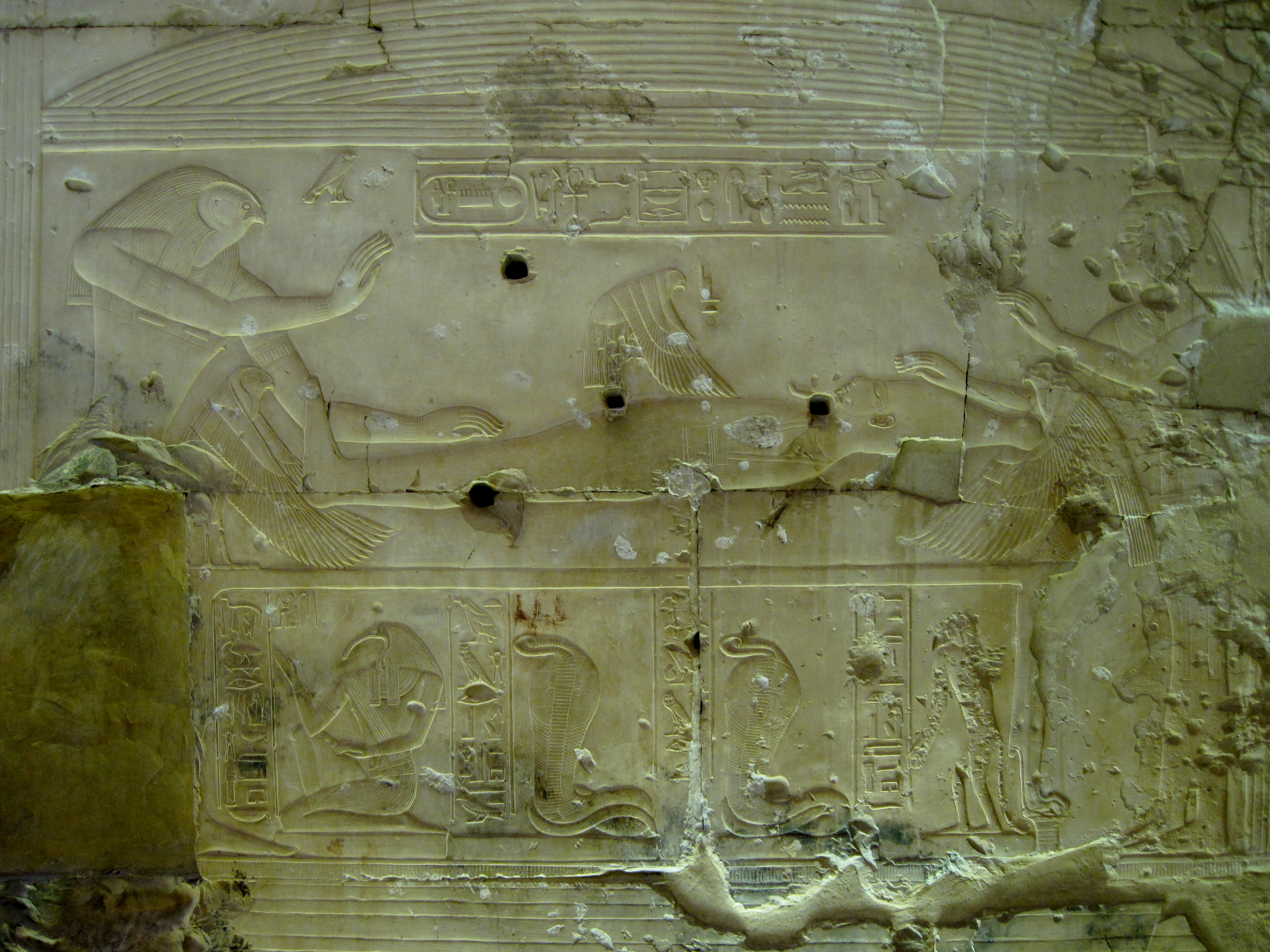
Isis, in the form of a bird, copulates with the deceased Osiris. At either side are Horus, although he is as yet unborn, and Isis in human form.

The belief in the conception of Horus by Isis is traced to the beginning of Egyptian history. Horus' conception and birth were understood in terms of the Egyptian doctrine of parthenogenesis, which was connected with the goddess Neith of Sais. (page 220) In Upper Egypt, Net was worshipped at Seni and represented with the head of a lioness painted green, with the titles: "Father of fathers and Mother of mothers," and "net-Menhit, the great lady, lady of the south, the great cow who gave birth to the sun, who made the germ of gods and men, the mother of Ra, who raised up Tem in primeval time, who existed when nothing else had being, and who created that which exists after she had come into being."

Egyptian texts mention numerous forms of Horus. In one he is "Heru-sa Ast, sa-Asar, or Horus, son of Isis, son of Osiris." Isis is described in the Hymn to Osiris, as finding and restoring the body of her dead husband, and using magical words given her by Thoth to restore him to life. Then, by uniting with Osiris she conceives Horus. Horus represented the rising sun and in this respect was comparable to the Greek Apollo.

There were at least fifteen other Horuses in the Egyptian pantheon, so in the story of Isis and Osiris Horus is "sometimes known as Harsiesis, to distinguish him from the others. He is depicted as a falcon, or with a falcon's head. He eventually avenged Osiris' death and reclaimed the throne, ruling peacefully...Herakhty, or 'Horus of the Horizon', was a sun god who rose each morning on the eastern horizon. He was often identified with the sun god, Ra, and was eventually absorbed by him, forming Ra-Herakhty."

Lineal descent from Ra, whether by birth or by marriage, was claimed by all kings of Egypt at least since User-ka-f, first king of the V Dynasty, who was high priest of Ra at Heliopolis. An important part of this tradition was the legend of the God Re generating with the wife of a priest. "The newborn child was regarded as a god incarnate, and later with appropriate ceremonies he was presented to Re or Amen-Re, in his temple, where the god accepted it and acknowledged it to be his child." This tradition was later inscribed in a stereotyped form in temple reliefs.

Many texts mention different attributes of Isis. These were combined into a single narrative by Plutarch in the 1st century AD. In her aspect of protector of Egypt and its people, Isis is depicted with huge outspread wings. She taught women to grind corn, to spin and to weave, and she taught the people how to cure illnesses. She instituted the rite of marriage. When her consort, Osiris, left Egypt to travel the world, Isis ruled the country in his absence. "The hieroglyph for her name is the image of a throne, and her lap came to be seen as the throne of Egypt. Because of her fame Isis eventually absorbed the qualities of almost all the other goddesses; "she was a great mother goddess, a bird goddess, a goddess of the underworld who brought life to the dead, and a goddess of the primeval waters...Her following spread beyond Egypt to Greece and throughout the Roman Empire...(lasting) from before 3000 BC until well into Christian times.

=== Pharaohs ===
There is a myth on the birth of Hatshepsut. In this myth, Amun goes to Queen Ahmose in the form of the Pharaoh Thutmose I and awakens her with pleasant odors. At this point Amun places the ankh, a symbol of life, to Ahmose's nose, and Hatshepsut is conceived by Ahmose. Another myth on divine birth concerns Amenhotep III: he is conceived by Amun which has gone to queen Mutemwiya in form of Thutmosis IV.

== Judaism ==
In the Hebrew Bible, and in later Jewish tradition there are stories of matriarchs giving birth where the God of Israel miraculously intervenes. For example, within the Rabbinic literature expansions were made on the birth of the matriarch Sarah on the earlier Old Testament traditions.

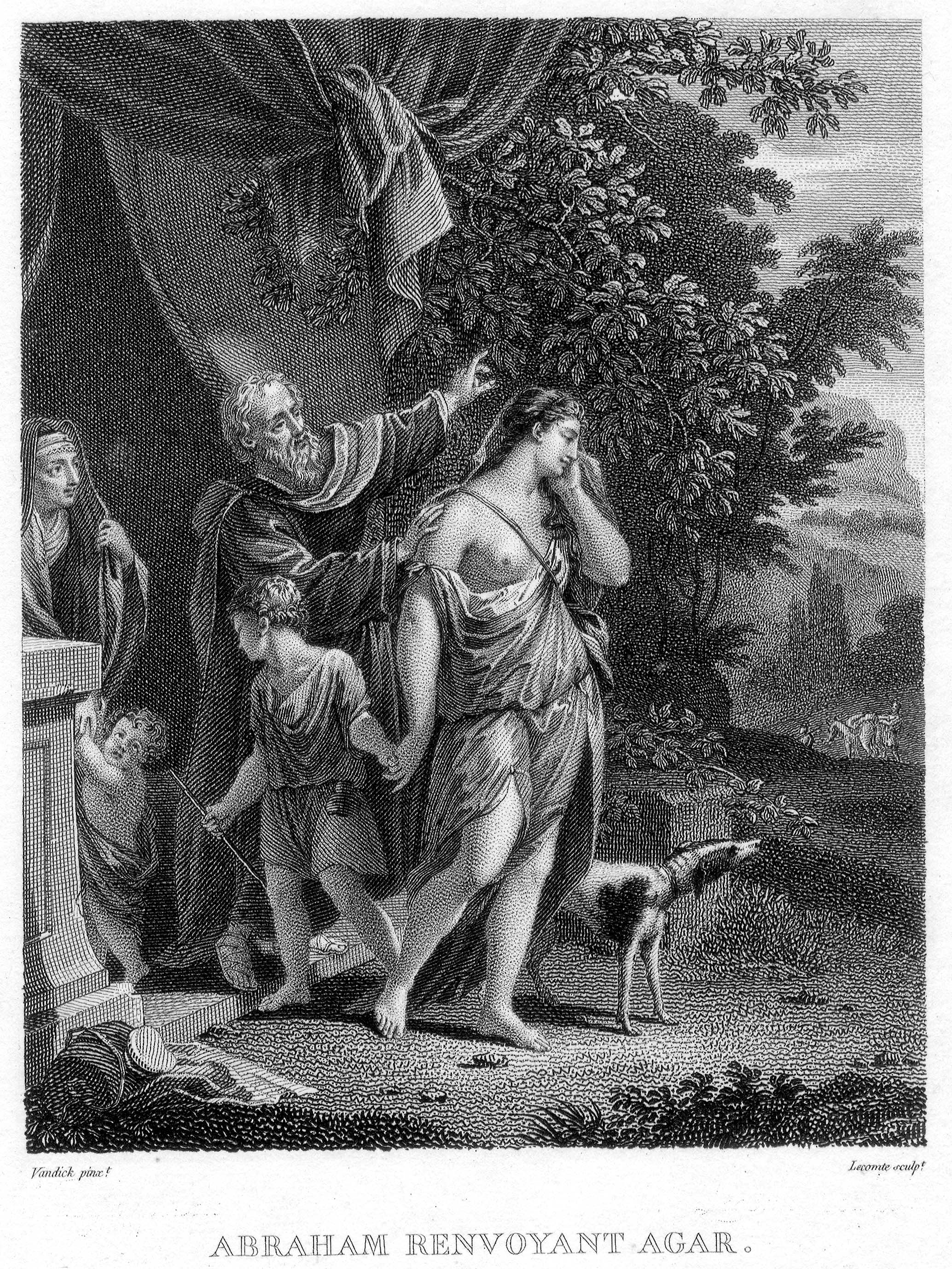
Banishment of Hagar. Sarah is seen on the left side, looking

=== Isaac ===
Due to her old age, Sarai was infertile, but a miracle was vouchsafed to her (Genesis Rabbah xlvii. 3) after her name was changed from "Sarai" to "Sarah" (R. H. 16b). When her youth had been restored and she had given birth to Isaac the people would not believe in the miracle, saying that the patriarch and his wife had adopted a foundling and pretended that it was their own son. Abraham thereupon invited all the notables to a banquet on the day when Isaac was to be weaned. Sarah invited the women, who brought their infants with them, and on this occasion she gave milk from her breasts to all the children, thus convincing the guests of the miracle (B. M. 87a; comp. Gen. R. liii. 13).

=== Jacob and Esau ===
Isaac and Rebecca were married for 20 years, before Isaac prayed earnestly, and the Lord answered allowed his wife to conceive. The twins Jacob and Esau were already fighting each other while in the womb, and prophesised to represent two nations, where the elder would serve the younger.

=== Immanuel ===
According to Isaiah 7:14, around 735 BC King Ahaz of Judah received a message from the prophet Isaiah during the Syro-Ephraimite War with Aram (Syria) and Israel, "Therefore, the Lord, of His own, shall give you a sign; behold, the young woman is with child, and she shall bear a son, and she shall call his name Immanuel." This is generally taken by Judaic commentators to be a reference to the non-miraculous birth of Hezekiah or another contemporary child, as indicated in Isaiah's following indication of the timing.

The Greek Septuagint and some later Christian translations, following the application of Isaiah 7 in Matthew 1, use the word "virgin". The Hebrew word alma actually translates as a young woman of childbearing age who had not yet given birth and who might or might not be a virgin, whereas the Hebrew betulah, used elsewhere in Isaiah, is the word that means "virgin." If the reference is to Ahaz's betrothed, Abi, daughter of the High Priest, no miraculous birth is implied, merely chastity. The Christian world believes that the verse is a messianic prediction of the miraculous birth of Jesus, as described in various gospels of the New Testament of the Bible.

=== Melchizedek ===
The Second Book of Enoch contains a section, called Exaltation of Melchizedek, which says that Melchizedek was born of a virgin, Sofonim (or Sopanima), the wife of Nir, a brother of Noah. The child came out from his mother after she had died and sat on the bed beside her corpse, already physically developed, clothed, speaking and blessing the Lord, and marked with the badge of priesthood. Forty days later, Melchizedek was taken by the archangel Gabriel (Michael in some manuscripts) to the Garden of Eden and was thus preserved from the Deluge without having to be in Noah's Ark.

=== Samson ===
Concerning the birth narrative of Samson, Marc Zvi Brettler argues that the Biblical text in Judges 13 subtly indicates that the angel of YHWH is Samson's actual father, and not Manoah, and thus he is conceived as a demigod. In this interpretation, the annunciation of Samson's birth to his barren mother is a censored account of divine conception.

=== Samuel ===
Hannah was a barren woman and wife of Elkanah who prayed fervently at Tabernacle, then God opened her womb and she dedicated her son Samuel to the temple. Her story is considered to echo the events surrounding Sarah and Rebecca, and other "barren mothers".

== Zoroaster ==
Zoroaster's name has been adopted from the Greek and Latin Zoroastres. The ancient form of his name in the Avesta is Zarathustra. His native country was probably Media in Western Iran (possibly in modern Azerbaijan), but his ministry took place in eastern Iran, especially in the region of Bactria, about 1200 BC. Zoroaster was originally a Magian priest, and under the reforms he instituted, Mithra became one of the Yazatas (Worshipful Ones), the angels or lesser divine beings.

"It was said that (Zoroaster's) birth was foretold from the beginning of time, and that the moment he was born, he burst out laughing and the whole universe rejoiced with him." After his birth evil demons tried to destroy him, but with Ahura Mazda's protection, he survived all attempts on his life. The Zoroastrian tradition differs from the Christian one because the divine only assists in the preservation of Zoroaster’s seed. "The central scripture, the Avesta and also the Pahlavi texts include the tradition that the 'kingly glory' is handed onward from ruler to ruler and from saint to saint for the purpose of illuminating ultimately the soul of the Zarathushtra." Also the scriptures clearly allude to conjugal relations between his parents, during which evil spirits try to prevent his conception. But according to later tradition, Zoroaster's mother, Dughdova, was a virgin when she conceived Zoroaster by a shaft of light.

== Greco-Roman and Hellenistic literature ==
=== Gods ===
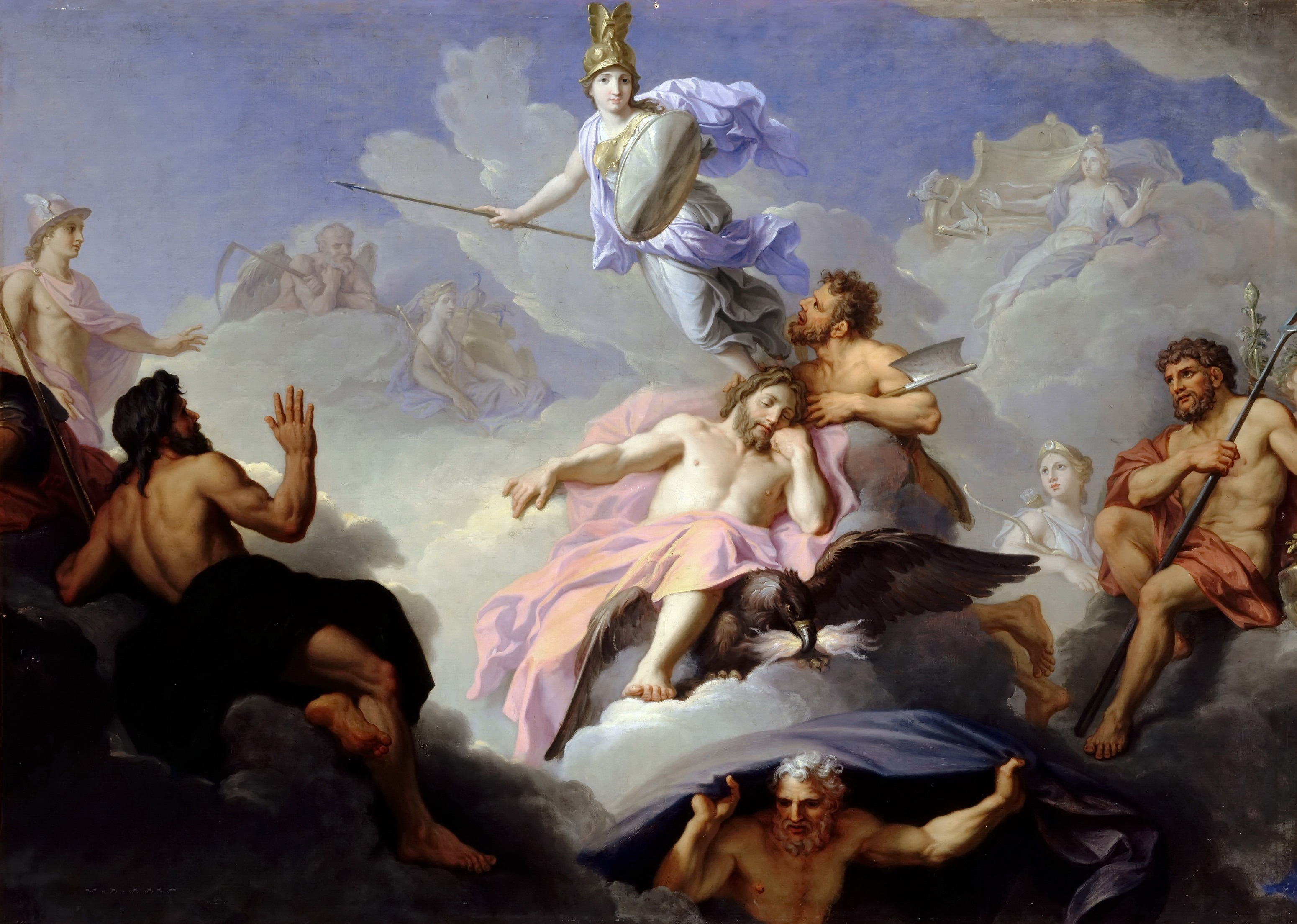
The Birth of Minerva by René-Antoine Houasse (before 1688)

Greco-Roman and Hellenistic literature is rich in the tradition of birth among the gods. In his poem Theogony, the Greek poet Hesiod tells a story that Zeus had once lain with the goddess Metis, impregnating her, but, fearing that she might bear a child mightier than he himself, he swallowed her. Their daughter Athena was born fully grown from Zeus's forehead, fully armed and clad in armor. Hesiod also relates that the goddess Aphrodite was born from the foam of the sea after Ouranos's castrated testicles were thrown into it.

Helios was a child of Zeus by Euryphaessa. He was also called "the son of Earth and starry Heaven," and the son of Hyperion. Dionysus was dithyrambus, "he who entered life by a double door." His first birth took place prematurely. His mother, Semele, died when Zeus appeared to her in a flash of lightning, and so Zeus opened his own flesh and enclosed the infant. In time, Dionysus was born "perfect" from Zeus' thigh. Dionysus Zagreus was important in Orphic theology. In Protrepticus ii. 14 ff. by Clement of Alexandria, this child had the form of a bull. Zeus intended to make him the ruler of the universe but the jealous Titans lured the child away, tore him to pieces, cooked him and ate him. Athena preserved his heart, however, which Zeus swallowed. According to Boslooper, Clement omitted one part of the myth that forms a connection between his account and the Theban legend of Dionysus. Because Zeus swallowed the heart of Dionysus Zagreus, when Semele bore Dionysus the new god was Zagreus reborn.

=== Mithra and Mithras ===
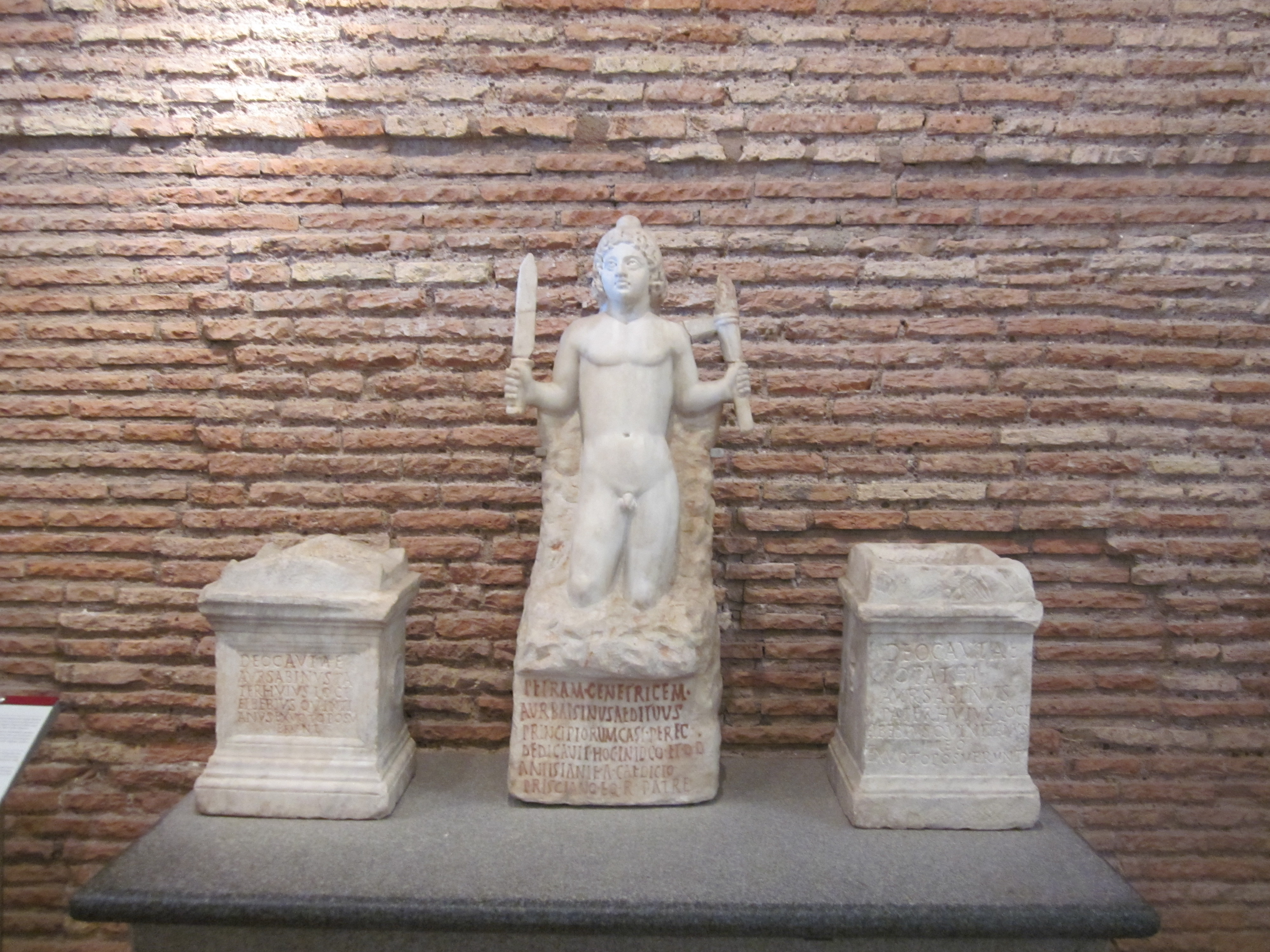
Roman statue showing Mithras born from the rock from the Diocletian Baths Museum

In Indian mythology, Mithra is known as Mitra. He was originally a god of contracts and friendship and was a forerunner of the Graeco-Roman god Mithras. In Iran, he developed into the protector of truth. Before the time of Zoroaster, he was associated with Ahura Mazda, the principle of good. As a consequence of Zoroaster's reforms to Iranian religion, Mithra was ousted from power and Ahura Mazda became supreme. In the more ancient Indian Vedas Mithra was the god of light, invoked under the name of Varuna, and was called "the Light of the World." He was the mediator between heaven and Earth.

"The light bursting from the heavens, which were conceived as a solid vault, became, in the mythology of the Magi, Mithra born from the rock."

Mithraism absorbed astrology from the Chaldeans after the Chaldean conquest, and continued as an astronomical religion. In the Hellenistic period it took on its final form. Mithra was assimilated into Graeco-Roman beliefs in the 1st century BC as Mithras. He was an ancient and highly honored god of Roman Paganism, where he was worshipped for more than 300 years as "the soldier's god."

=== Mythological heroes ===
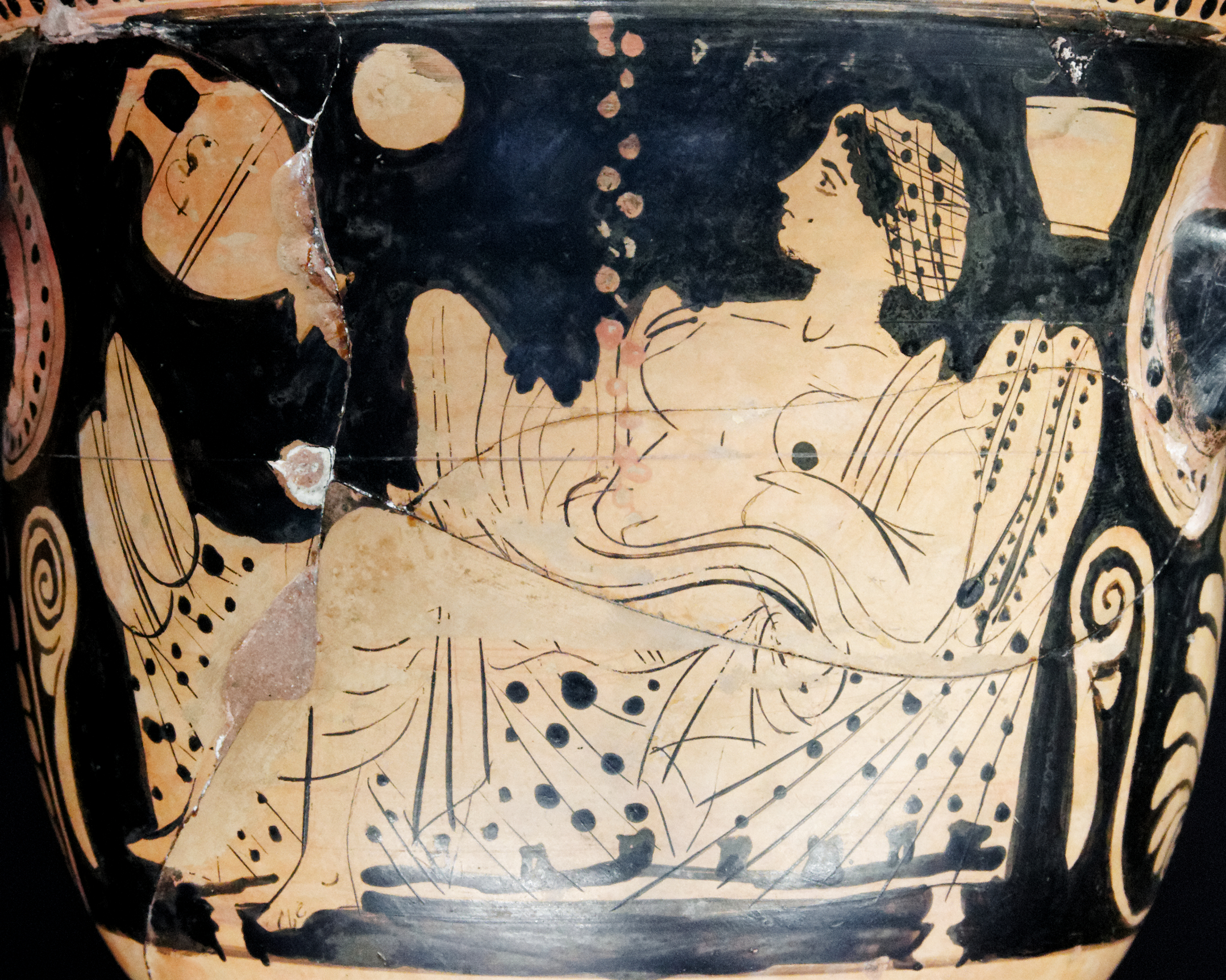
Ancient Boeotian bell-krater showing Zeus impregnating Danaë in the form of a shower of gold, circa 450–425 BC

The love of a god for a mortal, resulting in the birth of a hero, is one notable deviation from the tradition of the origin of gods. The legend of Perseus, whose mother conceived him when Jupiter came to her in the form of a shower of gold, is one example of this type (cf. Ovid, Metamorphoses, Book IV). The Greek Anthology has the following: Zeus, turned to gold, piercing the brazen chamber of Danae, cut the knot of intact virginity.

Heroes created by generation of a god with a mortal include Ion by Apollo and Creusa, Romulus by Mars and Aemila, Asclepius by Apollo and Coronis, and Helen by Zeus and Leda. Plutarch records how Theseus and Romulus were both born out of wedlock and of uncertain parentage and at the same time had the reputation of being sprung from the gods. He said that Theseus' grandfather Pittheus invented the story that Theseus was the child of Neptune to conceal Theseus' lineage as the son of Pittheus' daughter Aethra and Aegeus ("Lives", Vol. 1, p. 2; pp. 3 ff.). But there were other stories about the birth of Romulus and his brother Remus. The story of Romulus' divine origin says that his mother was the mortal daughter of Aeneas and Lavinia, and his father was Mars.

According to the Bibliotheca, Athena visited the smith-god Hephaestus to request some weapons, but Hephaestus was so overcome by desire that he tried to rape her. Athena fought him off. During the struggle, his semen fell on her thigh, and Athena, in disgust, wiped it away with a scrap of wool (ἔριον, erion) and flung it to the earth (χθών, chthôn). As she fled, Erichthonius was born from the semen that fell to the earth.

In his "Hymn to Asclepius", Homer attributes his origin to the god Apollo and the daughter of a renowned soldier, King Phlegyas. As the divine patron of the healing art, Asclepius became the most popular of the hero gods of Greece. The belief that religion was concerned with sickness and disease was central to his cult. His sanctuaries in the Greco-Roman world became so famous there was a movement to make him a god of the first rank and identify him with Zeus himself. Asclepius was "the one who leads and controls all things, the savior of the whole world, and the guardian of mortals."

Helen of Troy was worshiped as a heroine in several parts of the ancient world during the early historical epoch. Euripides' play "Helen" depends on a tradition begun in the early 6th century B.C. by the Greek poet Stesichorus that Helen was the daughter of Zeus (who took the form of a swan) and Leda. But this might simply be a poetic way of saying that she was hatched from an egg.

There are two versions of the birth of Oedipus. He was given a semidivine status in Sophocles' "Oedipus the King," where he was said to be the son of either Pan, Loxias, "or the Bacchants' god, dweller on the hilltops ..." and one of the nymphs of Helicon. But in Euripides' "The Phoenissae," his mother, Jocasta, says Oedupus is the son of Laius, a mortal, who was warned by the god Phoebus not to have children:

King of Thebes for horses famed! seek not to beget children against the will of heaven; for if thou beget a son, that child will slay thee, and all thy house shall wade in blood.

Laius ignored the warning, but after the child was born he gave him to shepherds to expose on Mount Cithaeron. The child was found and raised among the keepers of the horses of Polybus. As a grown man, Oedipus did indeed kill his father, not realizing who he was, and then married his mother. When he discovered the truth he blinded himself. In this story, he is clearly considered to be the son of Laius and Jocasta. This is also obvious in Sophocles' "Oedipus the King". According to Boslooper, "The two passages indicate that in the Greek mind the thoughts of divine and human paternal participation in conception were not mutually exclusive." (p. 178)

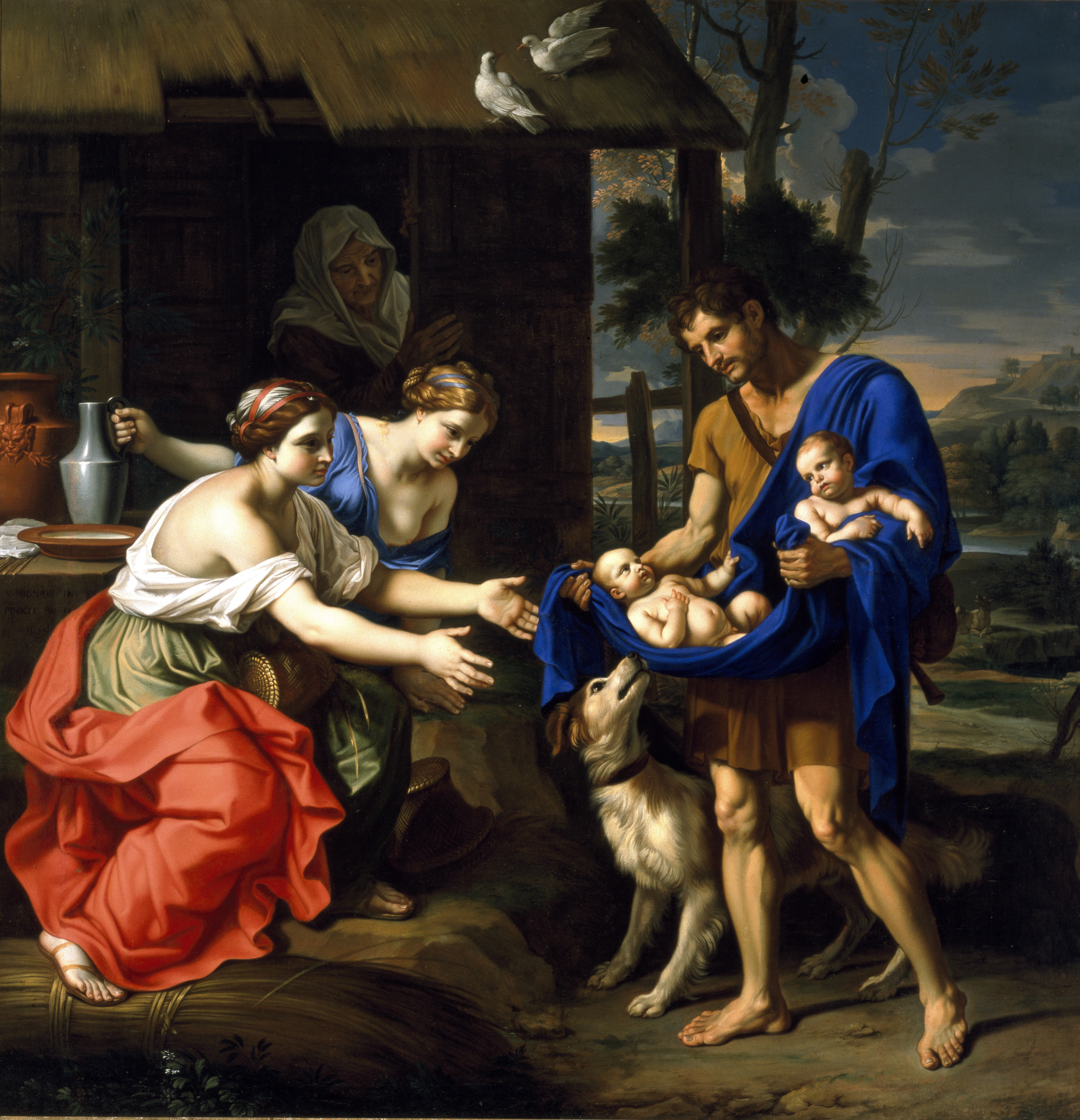
The Shepherd Faustulus Bringing Romulus and Remus to His Wife by Nicolas Mignard (1654)

Romulus and Remus, the legendary twin founders of the city of Rome, were said to have been born to a Vestal Virgin, Rhea Silvia. Rhea Silvia had been forced to become a Vestal Virgin against her will and claimed to have been impregnated through divine intervention. Livy attests that she was instead raped by an unknown man. In any case King Amulius ordered the twins to be drowned as death through the elements would not trigger divine punishment.

=== Historical figures ===
Alexander, the Ptolemies, and the Caesars were said by some scholars to have been "virgin-born." Alexander the Great, " journeyed to the Oasis of Amon in order that he might be recognized as the god’s son and thus become a legitimate and recognized king of Egypt. Inscriptions show that he and the Ptolemies after him had the incidents of their birth regularly depicted in temple reliefs.” (As cited by Boslooper) Norden calls this the Hellenistic virgin motif. However, evidence shows that Alexander must have had a double tradition of origin. It is recorded that "Alexander the Great and Augustus are deemed to have been conceived of a serpent god, and they claimed between them Phoebus and Jupiter as their progenitors."

“The Emperor Augustus was praised as the Savior of the world …[but] the idea of Savior was not unique or original with Augustus himself. Before him the same title was given to Seleucid and other Hellenistic kings. Throughout this period there were frequent longings for a savior from the present troubles.” Augustus was said to have had a miraculous birth and a childhood filled with many portents and signs. A few months before he was born a portent was observed at Rome which gave warning that nature was pregnant with a king for the Roman People. "Thereupon the Senate in consternation decreed that no male child born that year should be reared; but those whose wives were with child saw to it that the decree was not filed in the treasury, since each one appropriated the prediction to his own family." Boslooper relates several additional stories. In one, Suetonius narrates what he learned from Asclepias of Mendes:

When Atia had come in the middle of the night to the solemn service of Apollo, she had her litter set down in the temple and fell asleep, while the rest of the matrons also slept. On a sudden a serpent glided up to her and shortly went away. When she awoke, she purified herself, as if after the embraces of her husband, and at once there appeared on her body a mark in colors like a serpent, and she could never get rid of it; so that presently she ceased ever to go to the public baths. In the tenth month after that Augustus was born and was therefore regarded as the son of Apollo. Atia too, before she gave him birth, dreamed that her vitals were borne up to the stars and spread over the whole extent of land and sea, while Octavius dreamed that the sun rose from Atia's womb.

The hope for a savior was expressed in Virgil’s “Fourth Eclogue". The Church fathers later claimed this was a reference to Jesus Christ, however, the poem was dedicated to Pollio, one of the great influential men at the time of the civil wars and Virgil's patron and friend. The hero of the poem is a child born or to be born in 40 B.C., at the time of Pollio's consulate. A new era was expected, in fulfillment of an older oracle.

... Now the last age by Cumae's Sibyl sung
Has come and gone, and the majestic roll
Of circling centuries begins anew:
Justice returns, returns old Saturn's reign,
With a new breed of men sent down from heaven.
Only do thou, at the boy's birth in whom
The iron shall cease, the golden race arise,
Befriend him, chaste Lucina; 'tis thine own
Apollo reigns ...

For thee, O boy,
First shall the earth, untilled, pour freely forth
Her childish gifts, the gadding ivy-spray
With foxglove and Egyptian bean-flower mixed,
And laughing-eyed acanthus. Of themselves,
Untended, will the she-goats then bring home
Their udders swollen with milk, while flocks afield
Shall of the monstrous lion have no fear...

== Hinduism ==
In the story of Krishna the deity is the agent of conception and also the offspring. Because of his sympathy for the earth, the divine Vishnu himself descended into the womb of Devaki and was born as her son, Krishna. The Hindu Vishnu Purana relates: "Devaki bore in her womb the lotus-eyed deity...before the birth of Krishna, no one “could bear to gaze upon Devaki, from the light that invested her, and those who contemplated her radiance felt their minds disturbed.” This reference to light is reminiscent of the Vedic hymn "To an Unknown God," which refers to a Golden Child. According to F. M. Müller this term means "the golden germ of child" and is an attempt at naming the sun.

This is occasionally brought up as evidence for the hypothesis that "virgin birth" tales are a fairly common phenomenon in non-Christian religions around the world. However, there is nothing in Hindu scriptures to suggest that it was a "virgin" birth. By the time of conception and birth of Krishna, Devaki was married to Vasudeva and had already borne seven children.

In the Ramayana, Vishnu incarnates himself as a man, Rama, in the womb of Kausalya, one of the wives of the king Dasharatha. In the Mahabharata epic, Surya, the god of the sun, impregnates Queen Kunti before her marriage to King Pandu, causing her to give birth to their son Karna. Surya restores her virginity afterwards, thereby allowing her to marry Pandu, despite having already given birth. Also in the Mahabharata, Bharadwaja řshi goes with his companions to the Ganga River to perform his ablutions. There, he spots a beautiful apsara named Ghritachi, who has come to bathe. The sage is overcome by desire, causing him to involuntarily ejaculate out of excitement. Bharadwaja Muni captures the semen in a vessel called a Đroņa, and Đroņācharya himself springs forth from it.

However, some Hindus believe that when the emanations of the Supreme Being are pratyaksha, or obvious to the sight, they become sacara, or embodied. Krishna was such an embodiment and usually bore a human form. In that mode of appearance the deities are generally supposed to be born of a woman, but without any carnal intercourse. This belief is not adhered to by those who follow the Purva Mimansa, or the philosophy of Jaimini. They insist that the Devas were mere mortals whom the Supreme Being endowed with qualities similar to his own. In general, the Hindus perform acts of worship to some of their ancient monarchs and sages, who were deified on account of their eminent virtues.

== Buddhism ==
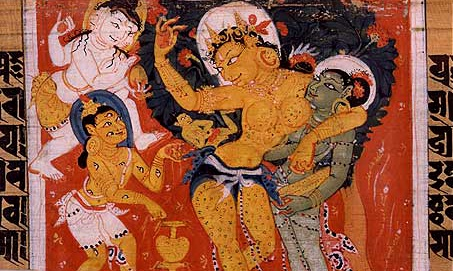
Māyā miraculously giving birth to Siddhārtha. Sanskrit, palm-leaf manuscript. Nālandā, Bihar, India. Pāla period

The stories of Buddha's unusual birth developed through the centuries. Two accounts cited by Boslooper tell of the descent of the future Bodhisattva from the "Tusita Body" into the mother's womb, the appearance of the Buddha in the mother as a shining gem, and the accompanying wonders in the natural world. These are the Majjhima-Nikāya, 123 Acchariyabbhutadhammasuta III. 119–124; (I. B. Horner, 1959, pp. 164–169); and Māhapadānasutta, Dīgha ii. In the Mahapadana-sutra, Digha ii. 12, is the description of the incarnation of the Vipassī Buddha:

Now Vipassi, brethren, when, as Bodhisat, he ceased to belong to the hosts of the heaven of Delight, descended into his mother’s womb mindful and self-possessed.

According to this text, the Vipassī Buddha was the first of six incarnations to precede Gautama. The others listed are Sikhī, Vessabhū, Kakusandha, Koṇāgamana, and Kassapa. The most popular legendary account of the birth of Buddha is in the Nidanakatha Jataka (see, Jataka tales) which accounted for the lives of Buddha in previous incarnations. In this account, the “Great Being” chose the time and place of his birth, the tribe into which he would be born, and who his mother would be. In the time chosen by him, Maya, his mother, fell asleep and dreamed that four archangels carried her to the Himalayan Mountains where their queens bathed and dressed her. In her dream the Great Being soon entered her womb from her side, in the form of a white elephant. When she woke, she told her dream to the Raja, who summoned sixty-four eminent Brahmans to interpret it.

"Then is described how at his birth he took seven great steps and at the seventh he shouted, 'I am the chief of the world,' how he at birth held in his hand some medicine that became for him the drug by which he later healed the sick and blind and deaf, how at birth he wished to give a gift but was presented one himself by his mother, and how lastly he sang the song of victory.'

In addition to the historical Buddha, the Vajrayana tradition of Buddhism includes many accounts of miraculous births. For example, Guru Padmasambava (Guru Rinpoche) is considered a second Buddha by Tibetan Buddhists and in some accounts is described as having been born from a lotus.

=== Tibetan Buddhism ===
The Nyingma school asserts the birth of Garab Dorje to have been a miraculous birth by a virgin daughter of the king of Odiyana (Uddiyana), and that he recited Dzogchen tantras at his birth.

A detailed interpretation of the hagiographic nativity of Garab Dorje briefly contextualizes his mother, a bhikṣuṇī whose sadhana was Yoga tantra, and her parents. The bhiksuni daughter has a dream in which a man holds the vase of the Astamangala, the 'threefold world', with the syllables 'oṃ ā hūṃ' and svāhā:

The Lord of Secrets (gSang-ba'i-bdag-po) instructed the Holders of Wisdom (Rig-'dsin) in Dhanakośa in Uḍḍiyāna the contemporary Swat valley. There was a large temple, called bDe-byed-brtsegs-pa; it was surrounded by 1608 smaller chapels. King Uparāja, and Queen sNang-ba-gsal-ba'i-od-ldan-ma resided there. They had a daughter called Sudharmā; she took the novice vows, and soon afterwards the full monastic vows. Sudharmā, together with her maidens, stayed on an island and meditated about the Yoga Tantra (rnal-'byor-gyi rgyud). One night the Bhikṣuṇī Sudharmā dreamed that a white man had come, who was utterly pure and beautiful. He held a crystal vessel in his hand which had the letters oṃ ā hūṃ svāhā engraved upon it. Three times he set the vessel upon the crown of her head, and light then shone from it. While this happened, she beheld the threefold world perfectly and clearly. Not long after this dream the Bhikṣuṇī gave birth to a true son of the gods.

== China ==
=== Yellow Emperor ===
The Yellow Emperor is sometimes said to have been the fruit of extraordinary birth, as his mother Fubao conceived him as she was aroused, while walking in the country, by a lightning bolt from the Big Dipper.

=== The Abandoned One ===
Qi, the Abandoned One, who later became known as Houji – a culture hero or god of agriculture – was held in some accounts to have been miraculously conceived when his mother, the consort Jiang Yuan, stepped into a footprint left by the supreme god Shangdi.

=== Laozi ===
Some Taoist schools held that Laozi was conceived when his mother gazed upon a falling star. He was born while his mother was leaning against a plum tree. Laozi was said to have emerged as an old man with a full grey beard. This may be because his name – "Old Master" (老子) – can also be read as "Old Child".

=== Abaoji ===
There are some legends about the birth of Abaoji (also known as Yi), the Emperor Taizu of Liao. According to the legends, his mother dreamed that the sun fell from the sky and into her bosom, from which pregnancy followed. When she gave birth, the room is said to have become filled with a mysterious light and extraordinary fragrance. As a newborn, his body was that of a three-year-old, and the legends go on to say that he was walking at the age of three months.

== Christianity ==
Mainstream Christian scholars agree that the nativity of Jesus, if not taken as historically accurate, should be interpreted within the context of first-century Judaism, not in the context of foreign mythologies, which contain only remote similarities.

=== John the Baptist ===
According to the first chapter of the Gospel of Luke, John the Baptist was born to Zechariah and Elizabeth, who were both very old and had been unable to have a child. An angel appeared to Zechariah and told him that Elizabeth would bear a son named John. Zechariah doubted the angel's words and was struck mute until the child's birth. Despite her advanced age, Elizabeth became pregnant and gave birth to John, and Zechariah's speech was restored after he wrote on a tablet that the child's name was to be John, as the angel had commanded.

=== Mary ===
The modern Biblical canon does not record Mary's birth. The earliest known account of Mary's birth is found in the Gospel of James (5:2), an apocryphal text from the late second century, with her parents known as Saint Anne and Saint Joachim. According to tradition of the Catholic church, they were childless when an angel came to them and told them they would give birth to a daughter. During the conception of Mary, she was preserved from the stain of original sin, a doctrine named the Immaculate Conception. Pope Pius IX invoked papal infallibility to define this doctrine as Catholic dogma in 1854, but it is rejected by many other denominations.

=== Jesus ===
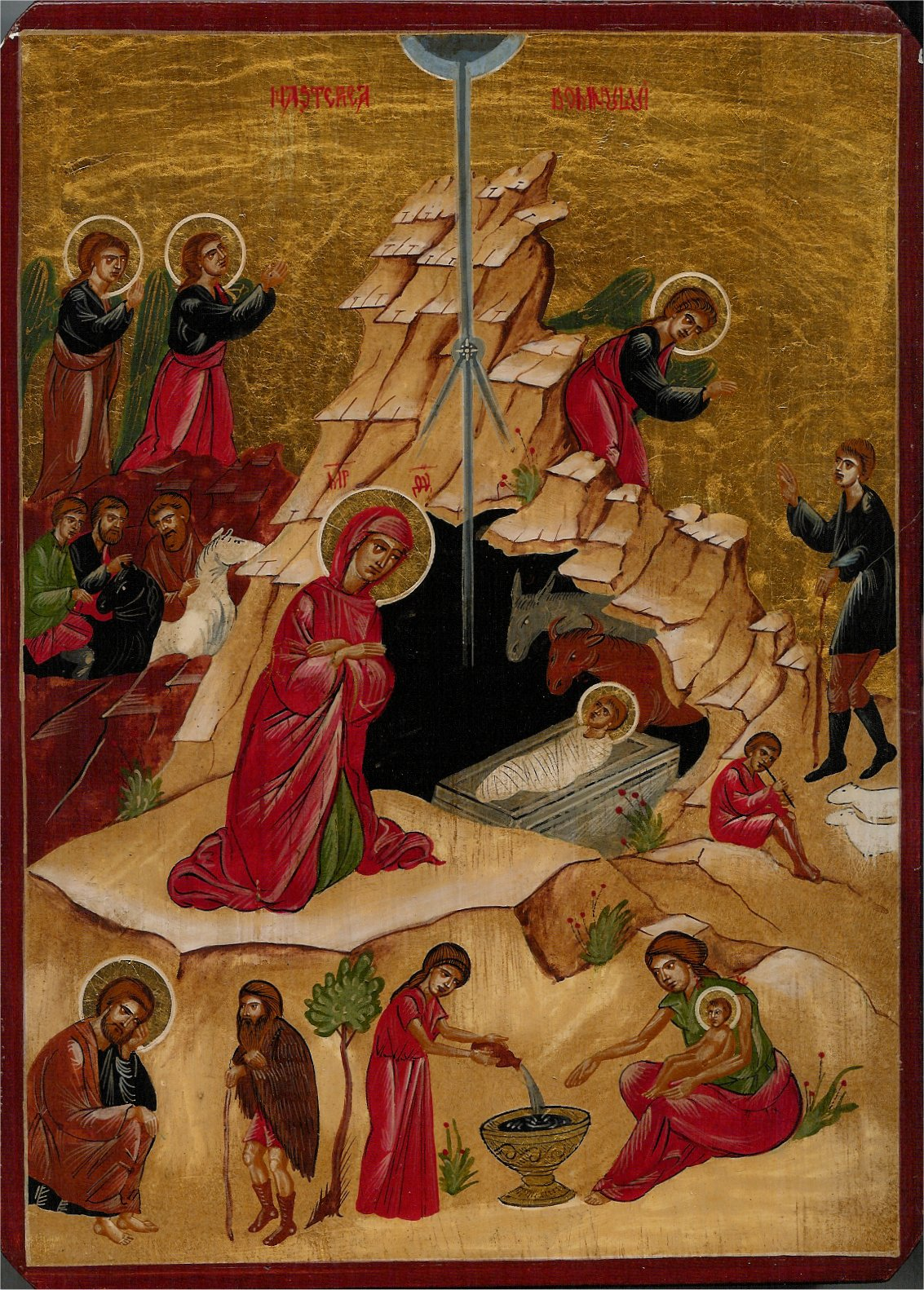
Romanian icon of the Nativity.

The Gospel of Luke and the Gospel of Matthew describe the nativity of Jesus. In the account in the Gospel of Luke, Mary learns from the angel Gabriel that she will conceive and bear a child. She asks "How this can be, since I am a virgin?". He tells her "The Holy Spirit will come upon you ... nothing is impossible with God.’ She responds: "Here am I, the servant of the Lord; let it be with me according to your word".

At the time that Mary is due to give birth, she and her husband Joseph travel from their home in Nazareth to Joseph's ancestral home in Bethlehem to register in the Census of Quirinius. Finding no place for themselves in the inn, Mary gives birth to Jesus and she places him in a manger (feeding trough). An angel of the Lord visits the shepherds guarding their flocks in nearby fields and brings them "good news of great joy": "to you is born this day in the city of David a Saviour, who is the Messiah, the Lord." The angel tells them they will find a child wrapped in bands of cloth and lying in a manger.

In the Gospel of Matthew, the impending birth is announced to Joseph in a dream, in which he is instructed to name the child Jesus. A star reveals the birth of Jesus to a number (traditionally three) of magi, Greek μάγος, commonly translated as "wise man" but in this context probably meaning "astronomer" or "astrologer", who travel to Jerusalem from an unspecified country "in the east".

After the 1st century, traditions flourished that represented the thinking of that time, and also preserved source material for many of the ideas in the "theological writings of the church fathers". In their present form the pseudepigraphal writings contained in the Sibylline Oracles include literature written from the 2nd century BC through the 6th century of the Christian era. They contain some material relevant to the birth and infancy of Jesus. But this passage in the Oracles, Book III, probably represents the hopes of pre-Christian Alexandrian Jews.

Be of good cheer, O maiden, and exult; for the Eternal, who made heaven and earth,
has given thee joy, and he will dwell in thee, and for thee shall be an immortal light.
And wolves and lambs promiscuously shall eat grass in the mountains,
and among the kids shall leopards graze,
And wandering bears shall lodge among the calves, and the carnivorous lion
shall eat straw in the manger like the ox,
And little children lead them with a band. For tame will be on earth the beasts he made,
And with young babes will dragons fall asleep, and no harm, for God’s hand will be on them.

Later, the church fathers refer to subsequent books in the Oracles that are clear allusions to Christ, and probably dated from the close of the second or beginning of the 3rd century AD. The first Christian theologians demonstrated in their writings their knowledge of such non-canonical sources.

The non-canonical gospels contain much that is pertinent. The apocryphal literature departs from the Christian canon and its legends have many elements similar to pagan stories representing popular beliefs of the church from the second Christian century on through the Middle Ages.

== Islam ==
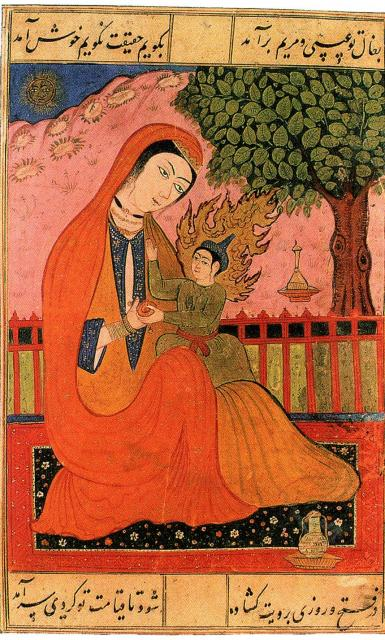
Mary and Jesus in old Persian Shi'a miniature.

=== Jesus in Islam ===
The Quran and other Islamic literature contain reports of a number of miraculous births of biblical characters. The Quran describes virginal conception of Jesus by Mary (Arabic: مريم, romanized: Maryam), which is recounted throughout several passages in the Quran. The narrative goes that Mary was visited by the angel Gabriel that she will give birth to a holy son, named Isa' (Jesus), the Messiah and that he will be a great prophet, to whom God will give the Injil (Gospel) and he will speak in infancy and maturity and will be a companion to the most righteous. When this news was given to Mary, she asked the angel how she can have a baby as she was a virgin. To this, the angel replied "Even though when God wants to create a matter, he merely wills (Kun-fa-yakun) it and the things come into being".

After giving birth, while resting near the trunk of a palm tree Jesus spoke to Mary from the cradle instructing her to shake the tree and obtain its fruits. After showing Jesus as a newborn to her family Jesus again spoke "Lo, I am God's servant; God has given me the Book, and made me a Prophet. Blessed he has made me, wherever I may be; and He has enjoined me to pray, and to give alms, so long as I live and likewise to cherish my mother" in order to dispel rumours of conception. This birth narrative draws strong parallels to the apocryphal tradition of Jesus' birth within the Infancy Gospel of Thomas and Arabic Infancy Gospel.

==== Kabir ====
In 1440, the poet Kabir was also said to have been born of a virgin widow (a Hindu), through the palm of her hand. Like Karna, Kabir was sent down the river in a basket; he was found and adopted by a family of Muslim weavers, downstream.

== Other traditions ==
=== Aztec ===
==== Huitzilopochtli ====
The myth of Huitzilopochtli is uniquely Aztec. Huitzilopochtli is therefore considered to be the cult god or the patron god of the Aztecs. As a solar deity, Huitzilopochtli is closely related to and overlaps with Tonatiuh. Huitzilopochtli's mother was Coatlicue, or She of the Serpent Skirt. Coatlicue, known for her devout nature and virtuous qualities, was at Mount Coatepec or Coatepetl ("Serpent Hill"; near Tula, Hidalgo) one day, sweeping and tending to her penance, when she discovered a bundle of feathers on the ground. She decided to save them and placed them in her bosom. Without her realizing, the feathers impregnated her.

==== Quetzalcoatl ====
There are several stories about the birth of Quetzalcoatl. In the first story, Quetzalcoatl was born by a virgin named Chimalman, to whom the god Ometeotl appeared in a dream. In another story, the virgin Chimalman conceived Quetzalcoatl by swallowing an emerald. A third story narrates that Quetzalcoatl was born from Coatlicue, who already had four hundred children who formed the stars of the Milky Way.

=== British ===
In the Matter of Britain, the wizard Merlin is said to have been born to a royal nun fathered by an incubus, according to the story as presented by Geoffrey of Monmouth.

=== Mongolian ===
According to a legend narrated by The Secret History of the Mongols, a Mongol woman named Alan Gua had a son, named Bodonchar, some years after her husband has died. She claimed a radiant yellow person visited her at night and impregnated her. She believed the visitor was the god Tengri. Bodonchar became the founder of the Borjigin tribe and a direct ancestor of Genghis Khan.

=== Japanese ===
Miraculous births are common in Japanese folklore, and include Momotarō the Peach Boy (who was found inside a giant peach floating on a river), Kintarō (about whom several origin myths are told), and Kaguya-hime (who was born inside the stalk of a glowing bamboo plant).

=== Native American ===
The Great Peacemaker, sometimes referred to as Deganawida or Dekanawida (Iroquois) was born a Huron, and by some accounts, his mother was a virgin, so the birth was miraculous.

=== Yoruba ===
The Yoruba deity (orisha) known as Ẹ̀là, is said to have been born to a virgin, Òyígí, and thus his birth was miraculous. This story is narrated in the Odu Ifa Èjì Ogbè. Other stories imply that the father may have been Orunmila.

== See also ==
- Christ myth theory
- Deification
- Monstrous birth
- Romulus and Remus
