= Lian the Great =

Figure in Chinese mythology

Da Lian 大廉
- Predecessor: Fei the Great
- Father: Fei the Great
- Mother: jade lady of the Yao

Lian or Lien the Great (Chinese: 大廉; pinyin: Dàlián; lit. 'the Great and Honest') was a figure in Chinese mythology. In the Records of the Grand Historian, Sima Qian's account of the origins of the House of Ying states that he was one of Fei the Great's two sons, along with Ruomu. He is said to be the great-great-grandfather of Mengxi and Zhongyan. His descendants ruled the State of Huang.
