= Xiang Tu =

Ruler of Predynastic Shang

Xiang Tu 相土

Ruler of Predynastic Shang
- Reign: ? - ?
- Predecessor: Zhao Ming of Shang
- Successor: Chang Ruo
Names
- Family name: Zi (子); Given name: Xiang Tu (相土); Alternate given name: Cheng Du (乘杜)
- Father: Zhao Ming of Shang

Xiang Tu
- Chinese: 相土
- Literal meaning: (personal name)
Transcriptions
Standard Mandarin
- Hanyu Pinyin: Xiàng Tǔ
- Wade–Giles: Hsiang4 T'u3
Wu
- Romanization: ^{1}shian 5thu
Yue: Cantonese
- Yale Romanization: Seung Tóu
Middle Chinese
- Middle Chinese: sjang thuX
Old Chinese
- Baxter–Sagart (2014): /*[s]aŋ tʰˤaʔ/
- Zhengzhang: /*slaŋ l̥ʰaːʔ/

Cheng Du
- Chinese: 乘杜
Transcriptions
Standard Mandarin
- Hanyu Pinyin: Chéng Dù
Wu
- Romanization: ^{5}tshen 6du
Yue: Cantonese
- Yale Romanization: Sìhng Dou6
Middle Chinese
- Middle Chinese: zying duX
Old Chinese
- Zhengzhang: /*ɦljɯŋ l'aːʔ/

Xiang Tu (Chinese: 相土; pinyin: Xiàng Tǔ; ? – ?), also known as Cheng Du (乘杜) was the third ruler of Predynastic Shang. His family name is Zi (子). He allegedly lived in Shangqiu (商丘), Henan (河南), where his grandfather, Xie of Shang, resided.

== Lineage ==
Xiang Tu was the son of Zhao Ming of Shang and thus the grandson of Xie of Shang, the founder of Predynastic Shang and descendent of the Yellow Emperor. He is also a direct ancestor of the King Tang of Shang. After he died, he was succeeded by Chang Ruo.

== Posthumous accounts ==
=== Influence on Transportation ===
Xiang Tu is mentioned multiple times in classical texts as having used and modified chariots during his reign, marking possibly some of the earliest use of Chariots in ancient China. Shaughnessy mentions that the Shang mainly used chariots as command vehicles and transportation mechanisms, which matches the mentioned themes.

==== In the Bamboo Annals ====
Xiang Tu is mentioned in the Bamboo Annals as producing a chariot during the reign of Xiang of Xia:

十五年，商侯相土作乘馬。遂遷于商丘。
In the fifteenth year of Di Xiang of Xia, Lord Xiang Tu of Shang made a horse chariot and thus transferred to Shangqiu.

==== In Discourses on Salt and Iron ====
In Discourses on Salt and Iron by Huan Kuan, Xiang Tu is cited in the second chapter:

大夫曰：「秦任商君，國以富強，其後卒并六國而成帝業。及二世之時，邪臣擅斷，公道不行，諸侯叛弛，宗廟隳亡。春秋曰：『末言爾，祭仲亡也。』夫善歌者使人續其聲，善作者使人紹其功。椎車之蟬攫，相土之教也。周道之成，周公之力也。雖有裨諶之草創，無子產之潤色，有文、武之規矩，而無周、呂之鑿枘，則功業不成。今以趙高之亡秦而非商鞅，猶以崇虎亂殷而非伊尹也。」

The High Official said: "Qin employed Lord Shang, and the state became wealthy and powerful. Later, it unified the six states and established an empire. However, during the reign of the Second Emperor, wicked ministers made arbitrary decisions, justice was not served, the feudal lords rebelled, and ancestral temples were destroyed. The Spring and Autumn Annals says: "The word "perish" refers to the departure of Ji Zhong 祭仲." (Note: Seemingly referring to the Gongyang Commentary) A skilled singer must have someone continue their song, and a good writer must have someone continue theirwork. The evolution from the solid-wheeled cart to one with cicada-claw-like components? That was the teaching of Xiang Tu. The establishment and perfection of the Zhou dynasty was due to the strength of the Duke of Zhou. Even with the initial draft by Bi Chen, without the polishing by Zi Chan; even with the rules of King Wen of Zhou and King Wu of Zhou, without the proper integration by the Duke of Zhou and Lü Wang, then the achievements of Zhou could not have happened. To blame Shang Yang for Zhao Gao's downfall of Qin is like blaming Yi Yin for the chaos caused by the worship of tigers in the Shang dynasty.

=== In the Classic of Poetry ===
In the Classic of Poetry's (詩經) Sacrificial Odes of Shang (商頌), specifically Chang Fa (長發) Xiang Tu is mentioned by name:

玄王桓撥，受小國是達，受大國是達。
率履不越，遂視既發。相土烈烈，海外有截。

[Then came] Xiang-tu, all-ardent,
And all [within] the seas, beyond [the middle region], acknowledged his restraints. - James Legge translation (1888).

=== In Zuo Zhuan ===
During the ninth year of the reign of Duke Xiang of Lu, Xiang Tu is described as taking after Xie of Shang (here named E Bo) as worshipping the star Antares, here referred to as the "Great Fire" 大火.

祝宗用馬于四墉，祀盤庚于西門之外，晉侯問於士弱曰，吾聞之，宋災，於是乎知有天道，何故，對曰，古之火正，或食於心，或食於咮，以出內火，是故咮為鶉火，心為大火，陶唐氏之火正閼伯，居商丘，祀大火，而火紀時焉，相土因之，故商主大火，商人閱其禍敗之釁，必始於火，是以日知其有天道也，公曰，可必乎，對曰，在道，國亂無象，不可知也。

Ritual ministers sacrificed horses at the four city walls, then sacrificed to Pan Geng outside the western gate. Therein, the Marquis Dao of Jin asked Shi Ruo, saying: "I heard that when a disaster occurs in Song, I know it is the Way of Heaven. Why is it so?". Shi Ruo responded: "In ancient times, Fire Officials would receive sacrifices correlating with the Xin or Zhou constellations in order to bring about the use of fire during seasonal rites. Therefore, Zhou is the Zhuque symbol, and Xin is the Antares constellation. The Fire Regulator of Emperor Yao, E Bo (Xie of Shang), lived in Shangqiu and worshipped the Great Fire Antares, using it to mark the seasons. Xiang Tu followed this practice. Therefore, the Shang dynasty worshipped Antares. The Shang people observed that the cause of their disasters and failures always began with fire. Therefore, they knew that there was a Way of Heaven. The Duke said, 'Is this inevitability certain?' He replied, 'It depends on the [state's] governance. When a state is in disorder, there are no regular heavenly signs—it cannot be known for certain."

== Family ==
- Grandfather: Xie (契) – a son of the Emperor Ku of ancient China
  - Father: Zhao Ming (昭明)
    - Son: Chang Ruo (昌若)

== Notes ==
Xiang Tu Predynastic Shang
Regnal titles
Preceded by Zhao Ming	King of Shang	Succeeded by Chang Ruo
