= Jiang Yuan =

Chinese mythological figure

Jiang Yuan (Chinese: 姜嫄) is an important figure in Chinese mythology and history. She is recorded as having lived during ancient Chinese history. Jiang Yuan was the mother of Houji, who is a culture hero and revered as the god of millet and, by extension, agriculture.

== Clan name and title ==
Jiang Yuan's personal name was not recorded. During the Spring and Autumn period, women were not called by personal names (名 míng) and even seemingly did not have such names, which could be considered taboo (諱 huì) to those of inferior status. Instead, Jiang is her clan name. Yuan does not seem to be a lineage name: instead, it seems to be a title signifying "origin" or "source", in reference to her role as the mother of Houji, whom is claimed as an ancestor of the royal Ji family of the Zhou dynasty.

== Mythological biography ==
Jiang Yuan was the mother of Qi (also known as Houji), credited in Chinese mythology with founding the Ji clan who went on to establish the Zhou dynasty. She was said historically to have been a consort of Emperor Ku. In mythology, she gave virgin birth to a miracle child. In some versions – such as that found in the Zhou hymn "Birth of Our People" – credit Qi with a miraculous birth after Jiang Yuan stepped into a footprint or toeprint left by the supreme deity Shangdi. The hymn records her as attempting to abandon him three times (his name Qi means "the Abandoned One"). According to mythology, the baby Houji was guarded in the street by livestock and fed by birds. Houji then (still little grown) introduced the cultivation of millet (ji) and other agricultural improvements and as the Lord of Millet set up the founding of the Zhou dynasty. Thus, the woman who gave birth to a child not sired by a husband mythologically became the ultimate human ancestor of the series of emperors known as the Zhou dynasty, the era when Chinese history as it is known truly commenced (Ferguson 1928, 6).

== History ==
In Sima Qian's rationalistic account in the Records of the Grand Historian, Jiang Yuan is simply the first consort of Emperor Ku and Qi is one of his children. He also records her lineage name as [Yóu] Tái [有]邰, also the name of the fief granted to her son Houji by Emperor Shun. In his account, he credits the success of Zhou as being due primarily to the two women: Jiang Yuan and Tai Ren (大任). It is possible he meant this to credit the virtue and success of their children, but it is also possible that they represented important marriage alliances. The Jiang were closely involved with the Ji before and after their rise to empire: Jiang Yuan was mother of Zhou dynasty's founder Hou Ji, Tai Jiang (or Jiang Nü) was wife of Gugong Danfu and mother of his son Jili, Tai Ren - born in Zhi (摯) and connected to the Shang dynasty - was wife of Jili and mother of King Wen.

== Legacy ==
The poem Sheng Min (生民) in the Classic of Poetry pays homage to Jiang Yuan by recounting her performing a ritual with incense to cure herself of her childlessness, thereby being blessed with the birth of Houji after stepping in a toeprint of Shangdi. The birth is said to have gone without any harm to Jiang, with no injuries or calamities. With Jiang's guidance, Houji was able to flourish.

In Chinese popular religion, Jiang Yuan is worshiped as a goddess.

== Sources ==
- Beckwith, Christopher I. (16 March 2009). Empires of the Silk Road: A History of Central Eurasia from the Bronze Age to the Present. Princeton University Press. ISBN 978-1400829941.
- Kleeman, Terry F. (1998). Great Perfection: Religion and Ethnicity in a Chinese Millennial Kingdom. University of Hawaii Press. ISBN 0824818008.
- Ferguson, John C. 1928. "China" in Volume VIII of Mythology of All Races. Archaeological Institute of America. <archive.org>
- Yang, Lihui & al. Handbook of Chinese Mythology. Oxford Univ. Press (New York), 2005. ISBN 978-0-19-533263-6.
