= Hou Ji =

Legendary Chinese culture hero

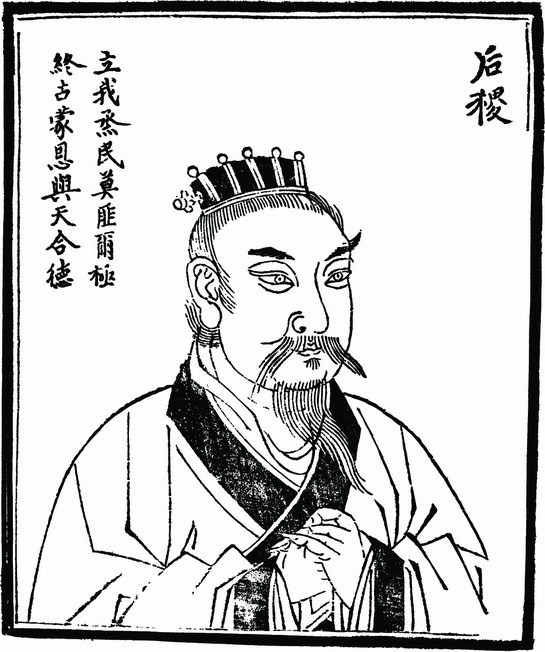
- Hou ji
- Other names: Qi
- Children: Buzhu
- Parent(s): Emperor Ku; Jiang Yuan

Hou Ji (or Houji; Chinese: 后稷; pinyin: Hòu Jì; Wade–Giles: Hou Chi) was a legendary Chinese culture hero credited with introducing millet to humanity during the time of the Xia dynasty. Millet was the original staple grain of northern China, prior to the introduction of wheat. His name translates as Lord of Millet and was a title granted to him by Emperor Shun, according to Records of the Grand Historian. Houji was credited with developing the philosophy of Agriculturalism and with service during the Great Flood in the reign of Yao; he was also claimed as an ancestor of the Ji clan that became the ruling family of the Zhou dynasty or a founder of the Zhou.

After the Zhou dynasty, ancient Chinese historians, folklorists, and religious practitioners had a variety of opinions on Hou Ji, including the opinion that he became deified as the god Shennong after his death.

== History ==
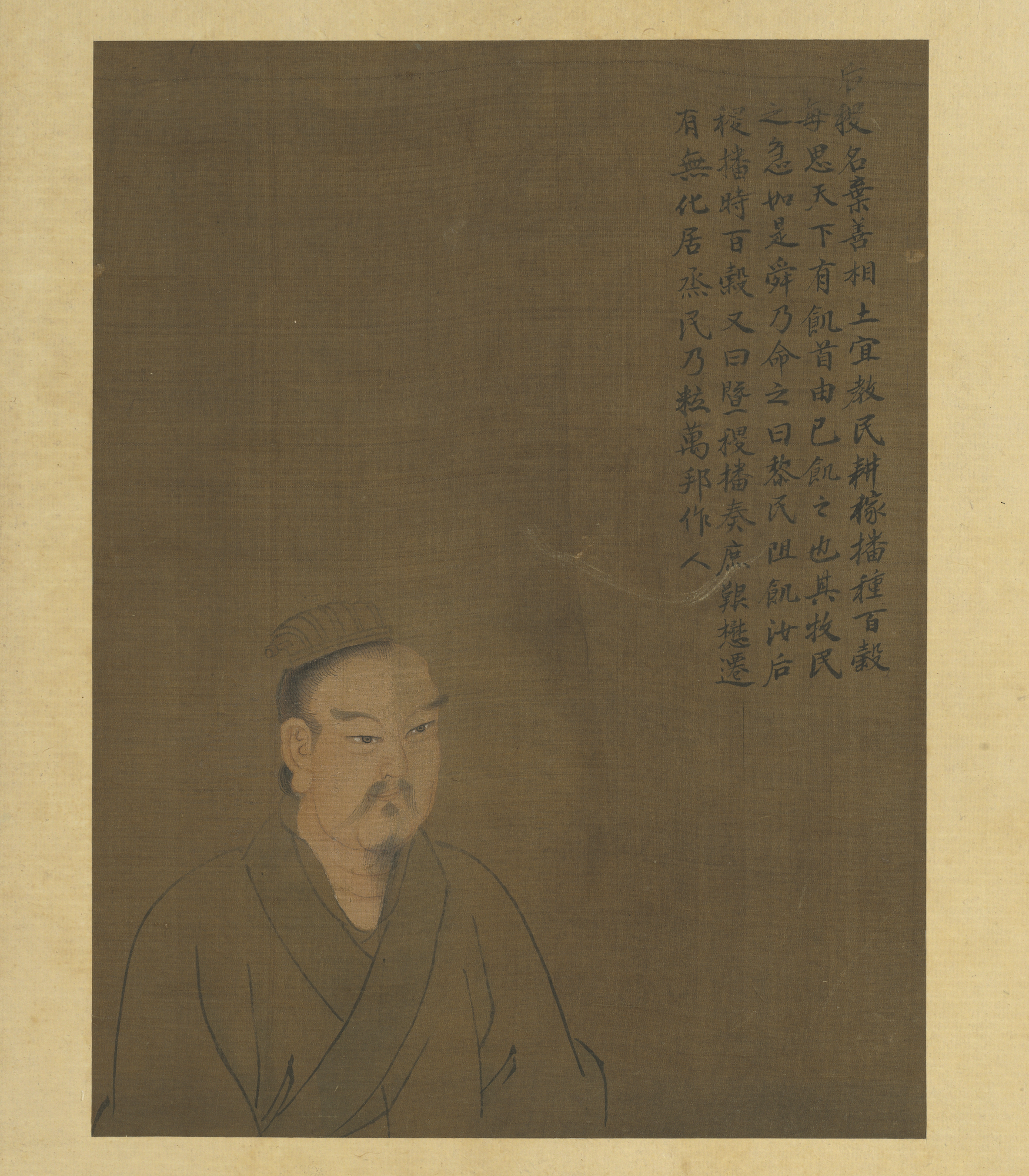
Portrait of Houji (National Palace Museum)

Hou Ji's original name was Qi (棄), meaning "abandoned".

Two separate versions of his origin were common. In one version of Chinese mythology, he was said to have been supernaturally conceived when his mother Jiang Yuan, a previously barren wife of the Emperor Ku, stepped into a footprint left by Shangdi, the supreme sky god of the early Chinese pantheon. Another account simply make him one of Ku's four sons, each prophesied to father a family of emperors over China. This origin allowed his descendants to claim a lineage from the Yellow Emperor as well.

He was held to have been repeatedly abandoned by his mother, but saved each time – in the street, by draft animals; in the forest, by woodcutters; on the ice, by a great bird. He later became famous for his luxuriant crops of beans, rice, hemp, gourds, and several kinds of millet and was credited with the introduction of the spring ritual sacrifice of fermented millet beer, roasted sheep, and the herb southernwood.

== Legacy ==
Houji was also claimed as an ancestor of the Zhou royal family and honored in their Book of Songs: the Sheng Min ("Birth of Our People") is counted as one of the work's Great Hymns. The Zhou ministers of agriculture were also titled "Houji" in his honor. His son Buzhu inherited his position at the Xia court. However, in Buzhu's old age, the Xia dynasty, descending from Yu the Great (a colleague of Hou Ji under Shun), declined politically; so Buzhu abandoned both his position and millet agriculture to live among the Rong and Di.

Although historians such as Sima Qian took a more rationalist approach to his life, making him a natural son of Emperor Ku and a regular official of the Xia court, Houji was honored not just as a culture hero but also as a patron god of abundant harvests.

== See also ==
- Ancestry of the Zhou dynasty
- The Five Cereals of China
- Shennong
- Shijing
- Shujun

== Bibliography ==
- Beckwith, Christopher I. (16 March 2009). Empires of the Silk Road: A History of Central Eurasia from the Bronze Age to the Present. Princeton University Press. ISBN 978-1400829941.
- Kleeman, Terry F. (1998). Great Perfection: Religion and Ethnicity in a Chinese Millennial Kingdom. University of Hawaii Press. ISBN 0824818008.
- Wu, K. C. (1982). The Chinese Heritage. New York: Crown Publishers. ISBN 0-517-54475X.
- Yang, Lihui, et al. (2005). Handbook of Chinese Mythology. New York: Oxford University Press. ISBN 978-0-19-533263-6
