= Emperor Ku =

Legendary ruler of China

Ku 嚳
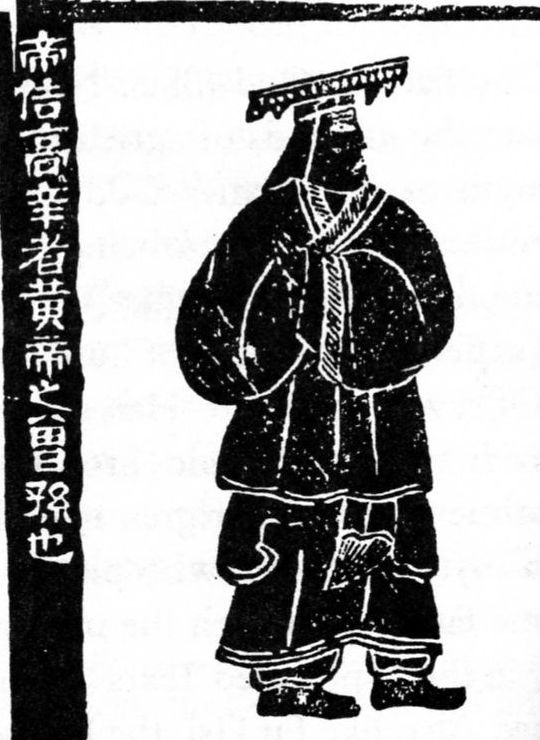
- Emperor Ku as depicted in Wu Family Shrines in Jiaxiang, Shandong, from the mid 2nd century AD.
- Predecessor: Zhuanxu
- Successor: Emperor Zhi
- Spouse: Jiang Yuan; Jiandi; Changyi; Qingdu
- Issue: Houji; Xie; Zhi; Yao
- Father: Jiaoji
- Mother: Juzi

Kù (traditional Chinese: 嚳; simplified Chinese: 喾, variant graph Chinese: 俈), usually referred to as Dì Kù (traditional Chinese: 帝嚳; simplified Chinese: 帝喾), also known as Gaoxin or Gāoxīn Shì (Chinese: 高辛氏) or Qūn (Chinese: 夋), was a descendant of the Yellow Emperor. He went by the name Gaoxin until receiving imperial authority, when he took the name Ku and the title Di, thus being known as Di Ku. He is considered the ancestor of the ruling families of certain subsequent dynasties. Some sources treat Ku as a semi-historical figure, while others make fantastic mythological or religious claims about him. Besides varying in their degree of historicizing Ku, the various sources also differ in what specific stories about him they focus on, so that putting together the various elements of what is known regarding Ku results in a multifaceted story. Di Ku was (according to many versions of the list) one of the Five Emperors of the Three Sovereigns and Five Emperors of Chinese mythology.

== Birth ==
Ku's lineage is derived from descent from the legendary Yellow Emperor, then through the line of Shaohao (as opposed to the line through Changyi, which led to Zhuanxu). He was the son of Jiaoji (蟜极; 蟜極), and thus grandson to Shaohao, and great-grandson to Yellow Emperor. According to speculative dates calculated after 100 BC by Liu Xin, he is supposed to have ruled from c. 2436 BC to c. 2366 BC, though other dates are also mentioned.

== As emperor ==
When he became emperor, Ku added the title Di, meaning "Thearch" (commonly translated as "Emperor"), in front of his name. After achieving the imperial title, Ku was said to travel seasonally by riding a dragon in spring and summer, and a horse in autumn and winter. Among other things, Ku was said to be an inventor of musical instruments and composer of songs. According to the Lüshi Chunqiu, drums, bells, chimes, pipes, ocarinas, and flutes were all invented, on the orders of Ku, by his subordinate Youchui (有倕); Ku's lyrics had musical scores (titles were jiuzhao (九招); liule (六列); liuying (六英; "snowflake")) composed by his assistant Xianhei (咸黑); and by a further imperial command, a dance accompaniment was provided by a phoenix. Although Ku held the title Di, it is unclear what territory, if any, his empire might have consisted of. The same title Di was later assumed by the King of Qin, upon conquering his neighboring kingdoms and forging them into the first historically known empire of China.

== Wives and Descendants ==
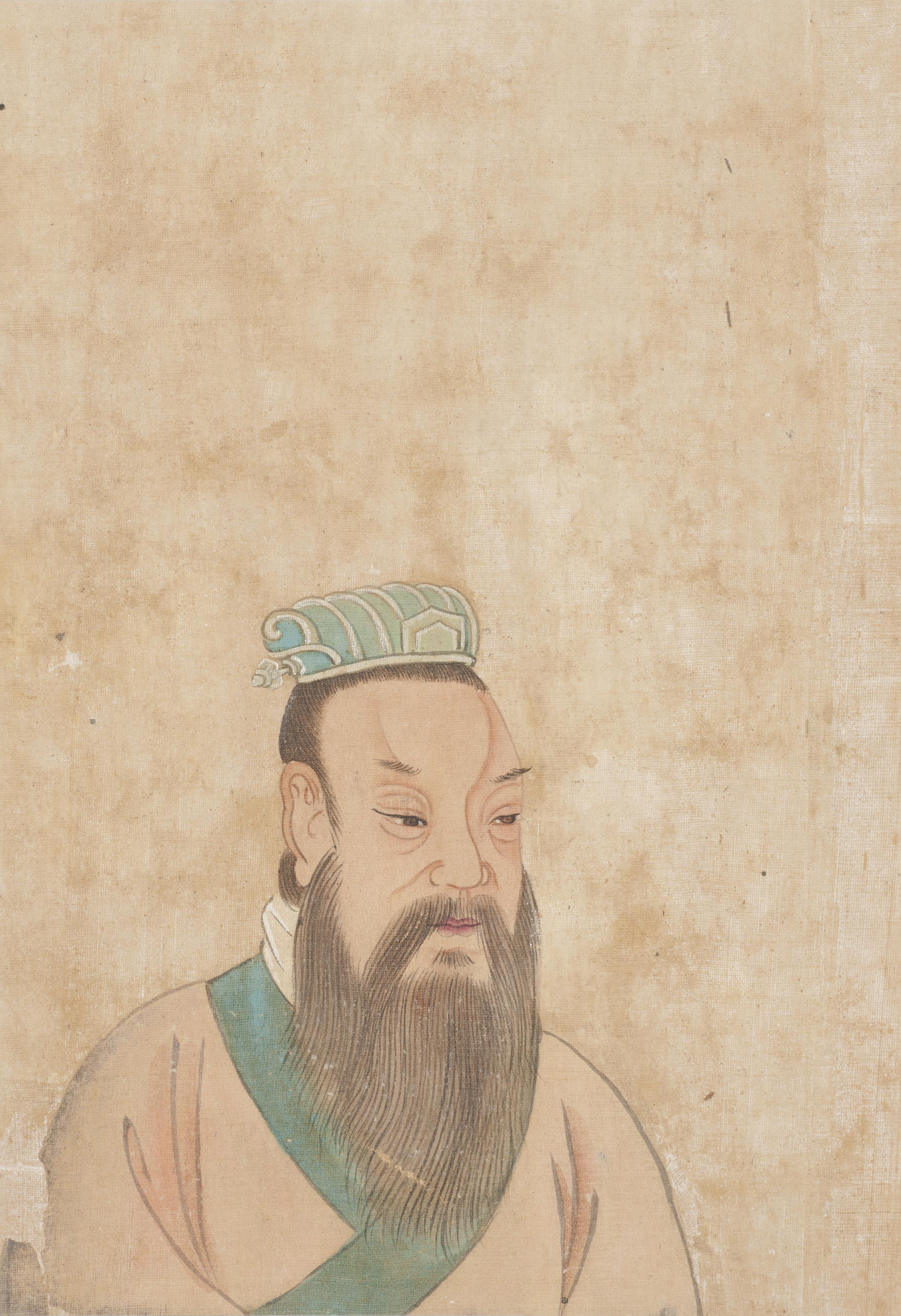
As depicted in the album Portraits of Famous Men c. 1900, housed in the Philadelphia Museum of Art

Ku had several wives. The best-known of his consorts are four ladies: Jiang Yuan, Jiandi, Changyi (常宜), and Qingdu (庆都). Once each of these ladies had given birth to a son (Houji, Xie, Zhi, and Yao, respectively) Ku had a diviner foretell for him which of the sons was destined to rule the empire, and he received the answer that all four would. Another source mentions a lady with whom he had eight sons, each one born after she had dreamed of swallowing the sun; although her name is uncertain, she was said to be from Zoutu. Shiji also recorded the lineage names of Zhi's mother as Juzi (娵訾氏) and Yao's mother as Chenfeng (陳鋒氏).

According to some traditions, each of these four sons inherited Ku's empire or was ancestral founder of a Chinese dynasty. The first of Ku's sons to rule the kingdom was Emperor Zhi, who was the son of Changyi. Another of his sons later became the Emperor Yao. Ku's son Xie, born miraculously to Jiandi after she swallowed the egg of a Xuanniao, became the predynastic founder of the ruling family of the Shang dynasty. Ku's son Houji, born miraculously to Jiang Yuan after she stepped in the footprint of a god, became a predynastic founder of the lineage of the Zhou dynasty.

According to Samguk Sagi, the kings of Goguryeo regarded themselves as a descendant of Chinese heroes because he called his surname "Go" (Hanja: 高) as they were the descendant of Gao Yang (Hanja: 高陽) who was a grandchild of the Yellow Emperor and Gaoxin (Hanja: 高辛) who was also a grandchild of Yellow Emperor.

== Bamboo Annals ==
In the Bamboo Annals, one of the earliest sources, it is mentioned that when Emperor Zhuanxu died, a descendant of Shennong named Shuqi (術器) organized a rebellion, but was destroyed by a descendant of Huangdi, Ku (of the Gaoxin lineage) the Prince of Xin; Ku then ascended to the throne. It also states that Ku "was born with double rows of teeth, and had the wisdom of a sage", and that he "made blind men beat drums, and strike bells and sounding stones, at which phoenixes flapped their wings and gambolled". The Annals further record that in the 16th year of his reign, he sent his general Chong (重) to defeat the state of Yukwai (有鄶). In the 45th year, Ku designated the prince of Tang (his son Yao) as his successor, however upon his death in the 63rd year, his elder son Zhi then took the throne instead, ruling 9 years before being deposed and replaced by Yao.

== See also ==
- Di Jun
- Dog (Chinese mythology)

== Notes ==
Emperor Ku Three Sovereigns and Five Emperors
Regnal titles
Preceded by Zhuanxu	Emperor of China	Succeeded by Zhi
