= Religious beliefs of the Shang dynasty =

Deities and cosmology of Bronze Age China

The religious beliefs of the Shang dynasty (c. 1600 – c. 1046 BC), the second royal dynasty of China, centred on a pantheon of deities comprising deceased ancestors, nature spirits, and a high power known as Di. These spirits were held to influence the weather, the harvest, warfare, and the health of the king, and were approached through divination and sacrifice. Almost everything known of these beliefs derives from oracle bone inscriptions of the Late Shang period (c. 1250 – c. 1050 BC), supplemented by archaeological remains and by later texts of uncertain reliability.

Ancestral spirits dominated Shang worship both in number and in the frequency with which they were addressed, and were organised in a hierarchy determined by generational seniority. Beside them stood nature powers – chiefly the Mountain Power Yue and the River Power He – and a group of ancestor-like figures known to modern scholarship as the "Former Lords". Above or apart from all of these was Di, the only member of the pantheon who received no sacrifice.

The nature of Di is one of the most contested questions in the study of Shang religion. Interpretations range from a supreme deity comparable to the Judeo-Christian God, through an identification with the legendary Emperor Ku, to the argument in favor of a generic nature of the term. Cosmological views locate Di in the pattern of stars at and around the north celestial pole. The binome shangdi, the name under which the deity is known throughout later Chinese religion, seldom appears in Shang records.

Shang cosmology set the king at the centre of a world ordered by the 'four directions', and construed natural and human events as balanced pairs of opposites – a habit of thought that that has been characterised, on the evidence of the paired divination charges of the Shang king Wu Ding, as a metaphysics of yin and yang. Totemic readings of the religion, associating the royal ancestors with birds or with a myth of ten suns, have been influential but rest largely on later texts. The pantheon itself was subject to changes, as over the two centuries covered by the inscriptions, Di and the nature powers appear with steadily decreasing frequency until, by the final reigns, divination concerned itself almost exclusively with a regularised cycle of sacrifices to royal ancestors.

== Overview ==
=== Sources and limitations ===
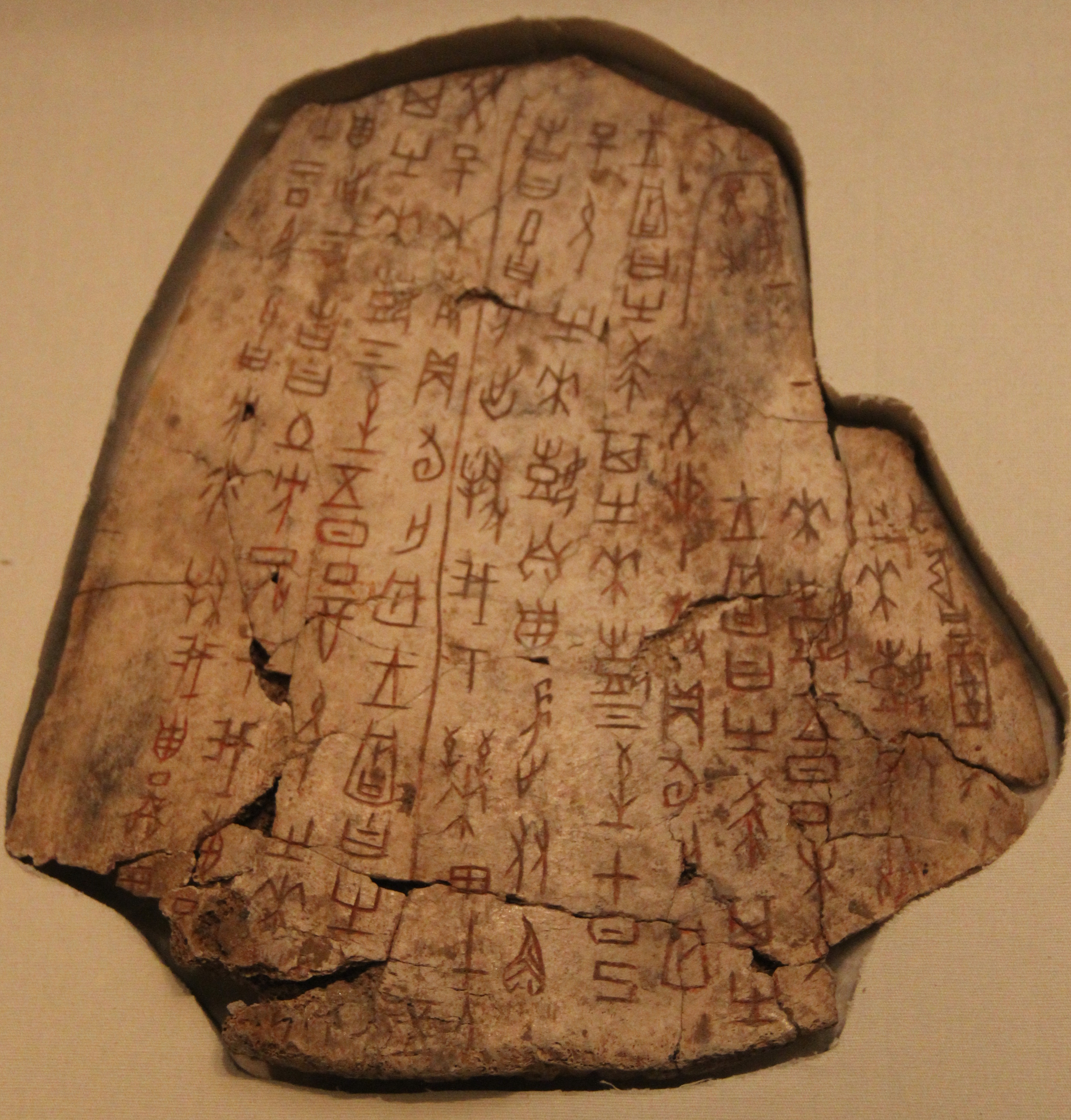
An inscribed ox scapula. Almost all that is known of Shang religious belief derives from texts of this kind.

The Shang religion did not rely on any scriptures to narrate its faith. Modern scholarship instead understands it through oracle bone inscriptions, which act as the main textual evidence, together with archaeological remains of ritual activities. The sinologist David Keightley preferred to describe the tradition attested in these texts as "religiosity" rather than "religion", owing to the limited scope of what they reveal of Shang subjective experience.

Several constraints follow from the nature of this evidence. Shang inscriptions record matters whose divination mattered to the ruling elite, so that features they reveal cannot, in a straightforward way, be assigned either to a state religion or to lineage and personal practice. They contain no narrative or expository writing; therefore, spirits that they name are not associated with any stories, and the pattern of worship is left without a stated rationale. Interpretation, as such, depends on later traditions of uncertain application. Inscribed oracle bones also constituted only about one-tenth of the corpus excavated at the last Shang capital, with uninscribed ones for divination recovered from widely dispersed sites, indicating that the literate record represents only a narrow portion of religious practice.

Interpretations of Shang belief may also encounter limitations from traditional Chinese notions of cultural continuity. Because the Shang furnish the earliest written evidence from China, features of later Chinese religion are often sought in their inscriptions; the Shang state meanwhile was preceded and surrounded by cultures of comparable complexity, and elements of later tradition may descend from these rather than from the Shang.

=== Pantheon structure ===
The Shang articulated a pantheon filled with deities of various origins, particularly ancestral and natural. Following Keightley's classification, its members are commonly grouped into six categories of "Powers": pre-dynastic kings, dynastic kings, heir-producing royal consorts, the Former Lords, the nature powers, and the High God Di. The first three constitute the core royal lineage; the remainder stand in uncertain or no relation to it.

Despite featuring a wide and diverse range of deities, Shang religion was dominated by ancestor worship, with core tenets of belief centred on relationships between the living and the dead. Divisions between these categories are less sharp than they appear. The River and Mountain Powers are listed in series with Former Lords and pre-dynastic kings in single inscriptions, and are treated in worship in ways that parallel ancestral spirits, leading some scholars to propose that the Shang construed nature powers as remote forbears of the royal line. Nor were functions clearly divided, with control over natural phenomena attributed to Di, the nature powers, the Former Lords, the pre-dynastic kings and at least one dynastic king alike.

Whether Shang religion was bureaucratic, or at least proto-bureaucratic, is disputed. Keightley posited a bureaucratic stance, on grounds of the depersonalisation of the spirits, the rationalisation of the pantheon, and the routinisation of divination. Eno accepts that divination grew increasingly routinised and that the ancestral pantheon was ordered by strict seniority, but rejects the description of the pantheon itself as bureaucratic based on several observations – no more than ten inscriptions depict Di commanding other spirits, and a hierarchy resting entirely on ascriptive traits of lineage, without division of function, is in his view dissimilar to a bureaucracy. Sarah Allan similarly declines the characterisation of the exchange between the king and his ancestors as contractual, at least for the earliest period.

== High God Di ==
Two Shang oracle bone script forms of the graph for Di (帝)

The head of the Shang pantheon was Di (帝), the 'High God'. The Shang sought to understand the will of this deity through the practice of divination using oracle bones. (Note: Modern scholars studying Di often refer to the deity as Shangdi. The binome shangdi (上帝) itself, however, appears in only three oracle-bone inscriptions, and is rarely seen in the Shang record by comparison with later texts.) It is unknown whether Di is mentioned in Shang bronze inscriptions.

=== Attributed powers ===
The Shang believed that Di exercised authority over both the natural and human worlds, which included controlling the climate, influencing the harvest, and overseeing the outcomes of battles. Di expressed approval or disapproval over the everyday actions of humans, and was thought to be capable of either providing aid or sending down disasters. Inscriptions record Di bringing an end to a city and determining whether the Shang would receive support in attacking an enemy people.

Di has commonly been understood as presiding over a hierarchy of spirits, including former humans and nature deities, all of whom were under Di's control, and as the only power able to issue commands (令; lìng). Both parts of this account have been scrutinised in light of existing inscriptional evidence. Eno finds an articulated command structure largely absent from the inscriptions, noting one text in which the River Power orders rain, and observes that where Di is said to order rain or thunder, what is commanded appears to be a natural phenomenon rather than a subordinate deity. John C. Didier identifies He, Huang Yin and Yi Yin as further spirits able to ling rain and secure good harvests, and notes that nature powers and Former Lords were petitioned for rain in the same terms as Di.

A small group of inscriptions refers to the "Five Adjutants" or "Five Ministers" (五臣; wǔchén) of Di, and one to "Di's envoy Wind". Didier interprets the former as subordinate spirits transmitting Di's messages to the human world, possibly associated with the five classical planets. Eno regards the evidence as too slight to establish a divine bureaucracy, the phrase being attested on only a handful of bone fragments, two of them in ambiguous contexts.

=== Absence of worship ===
While the Shang conducted rituals to ensure Di would not harm them, there is no evidence that they made sacrifices to Di as they did to other spirits, implying a significant distinction in how Di was perceived. (Note: Shima Kunio argued that Di did receive direct sacrifice, assembling five candidate inscriptions; Eno rejects four of these and regards the fifth as uncertain, while Didier considers Shima's evidence "extremely limited and tenuous".) Di is in this respect anomalous: alone among the spirits, Di appears to have needed and desired no sustenance.

Three explanations have been offered. The traditional view, associated with Hu Houxuan, holds that Di was too exalted to receive offerings directly, and that sacrifices reached Di through an ancestral intermediary acting as "helpmate" (配; pèi). Eno objects that the evidence for this practice derives from Zhou and later texts rather than from Shang inscriptions, and argues instead that di was a generic term and therefore an inappropriate way of naming the object of a sacrifice. Didier holds that Di received no cult because it was "a single and impersonal council of godliness" rather than a god possessing a single consciousness.

=== Identity ===
The identity of Di has been the subject of debate. Didier attributes the persistence of a singular, monotheistic reading in Western scholarship to two influences: the pyramidal hierarchy of deities that emerges in Chinese thought from about the 4th century BC, some six or seven centuries after the fall of the Shang; and the expectations of Christian missionaries from the 17th century onwards, who sought to identify Di with the God of the Bible.

==== As supreme deity ====
Some scholars proposed that the Shang conceived of Di in a manner similar to the Judeo-Christian God. This reading predates the discovery of the oracle bone inscriptions and rests principally on the use of the term di in early Zhou texts such as the Shijing and the Shangshu, in which Di appears as a semi-abstract anthropomorphic deity substantially identical with Tian.

==== As Emperor Ku ====
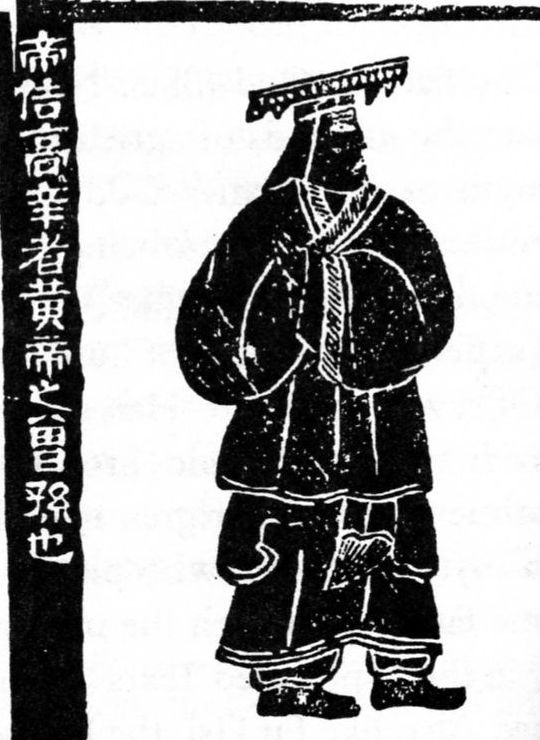
Emperor Ku, the third of the Five Emperors in Sima Qian's account, with whom Di has been identified

Some theories identify Di with the legendary Emperor Ku, the third of the Five Emperors mentioned as preceding the Shang in Sima Qian's Shiji (c. 91 BC). Emperor Ku could be the same as a Shang spirit whose ascribed name may read as Kui, addressed as "High Ancestor" in at least four Shang inscriptions. This might prove to be useful for the Shang king, who accordingly was seen as sharing portions of the High God's power, and would in effect universalise the ancestral worship of the royal Zi clan.

This identification is subject to various obstacles – Di issues orders and sends down approval while Kui does not, and Kui receives cult while Di does not; Kui is also invoked in series with other powers in a way suggestive of a horizontal relationship rather than an apex. Keightley has objected more generally to any account making Di a composite of Shang ancestors, on the grounds that Di could act against the Shang, such as by ordering enemy attacks.

==== As a collective reference ====
Eno argues that Shang religion did not conceive of a high god as such, and that di functioned solely as a generic or corporate term – denoting not "God on High" but "the gods" or "the god", whose referent was understood from the context of a given divination. He advances four grounds: the absence of sacrifices to Di; inconsistent usage of the term, including a set of inscriptions in which Di appears in sequence with named royal ancestors; the apparent use of di as a plural, parallel to collective nouns such as 'the many consorts' (多妣; duōbǐ) and 'those below and above' (下上; xiàshàng); and its use as an honorific, in which di replaces fu (父, 'father') in naming the deceased father of a reigning king. He concludes that di denoted whatever portion of the pantheon was being treated as its apex in the context of a given divination – the whole pantheon, a part of it, the lineage founder, or the reigning king's father.

Eno provides an etymological support by deriving di from a root meaning of 'father', particularly a deceased lineage leader, on the basis of cognate terms and of later Zhou evidence that the di sacrifice was offered to a father; on this reading the graph depicts an ancestral altar rather than, as commonly held, the calyx of a flower. He further proposes that the concept of a supreme deity emerged only with the Zhou, through a merger of Di with the Zhou sky deity Tian.

The strongest evidence against this proposed identification, as determined by Eno, is a set of inscriptions recording the bin (賓) hosting ritual, in which Di appears as host to the Shang first dynastic ancestor Da Yi, indicating both an individual character and a senior status. (Note: Michael Puett reads the same inscriptions as linking Di to the ancestral pantheon.)

==== Corporate-celestial theory ====
While agreeing with Eno that Di was not singular – and describing the evidence for a corporate Di as far outweighing that for a monotheistic arrangement – Didier differs from him in three respects. He locates the root meaning of di in the realm of spirits rather than in kinship vocabulary, following Hayashi Minao and Itô Michiharu, and assigns the sense of 'progenitor' instead to the square element (口). He regards Eno's corporeity as too narrowly ancestral. And he rejects the abstract characterisation for Di, holding that it referred to an object in the natural world, namely the pattern of stars at and around the north celestial pole.

According to Didier, Di was a consular body comprising the most powerful spirits known to the Shang – royal and non-royal ancestors, non-Shang former humans, and nature spirits – whose central core, represented by the rectangular element of the graph di, consisted of the mainline (dazong) royal ancestors. He infers a corresponding division into an upper component, Shangdi (上帝), and a lower counterpart, Xiadi (下帝), partly from the semantics of the pair shangxia (上下) and partly from a graphic argument: the dot written above some forms of di is equivalent to the full shang element, on the analogy of the variant forms of the Predynastic ancestor Shang Jia's name, so that inscriptions of plain di cannot securely be distinguished from those denoting Shangdi.

Didier reads the bin hosting inscriptions – the evidence Eno identifies as most contradictory to a corporate interpretation – as supportive, on the grounds that ancestral spirits are recorded hosting Di and one another, that these same spirits shared Di's powers, and that they received the di sacrifice. He rejects the reading, associated with Shima Kunio, on which bin denotes proxy-hosting to reach a remote Di, regarding it as a projection of a later Zhou ritual onto the Shang record.

==== Other proposals ====
There exist multiple other theories regarding the nature of Di. Zhu Fenghan, for instance, argues that Di was a cosmic spirit rather than a supreme god. Itô Michiharu and Hayashi Minao defined Di as an abstract high power that absorbed the deities of peoples conquered or assimilated by the Shang over the course of the dynasty, a process that would account for the complexity of the Shang pantheon relative to that of the Zhou.

== Nature spirits ==
Nature powers were typically addressed by the Shang only when the need for general blessings or assistance against natural calamities were urgent, and they seemed to have less influence than ancestor spirits. Their membership in the pantheon is uneven: the River and Mountain Powers are attested frequently and with clearly defined roles, while for most other candidates the volume of evidence drops sharply and the interpretation of individual inscriptions is disputed.

=== Mountain and river powers ===
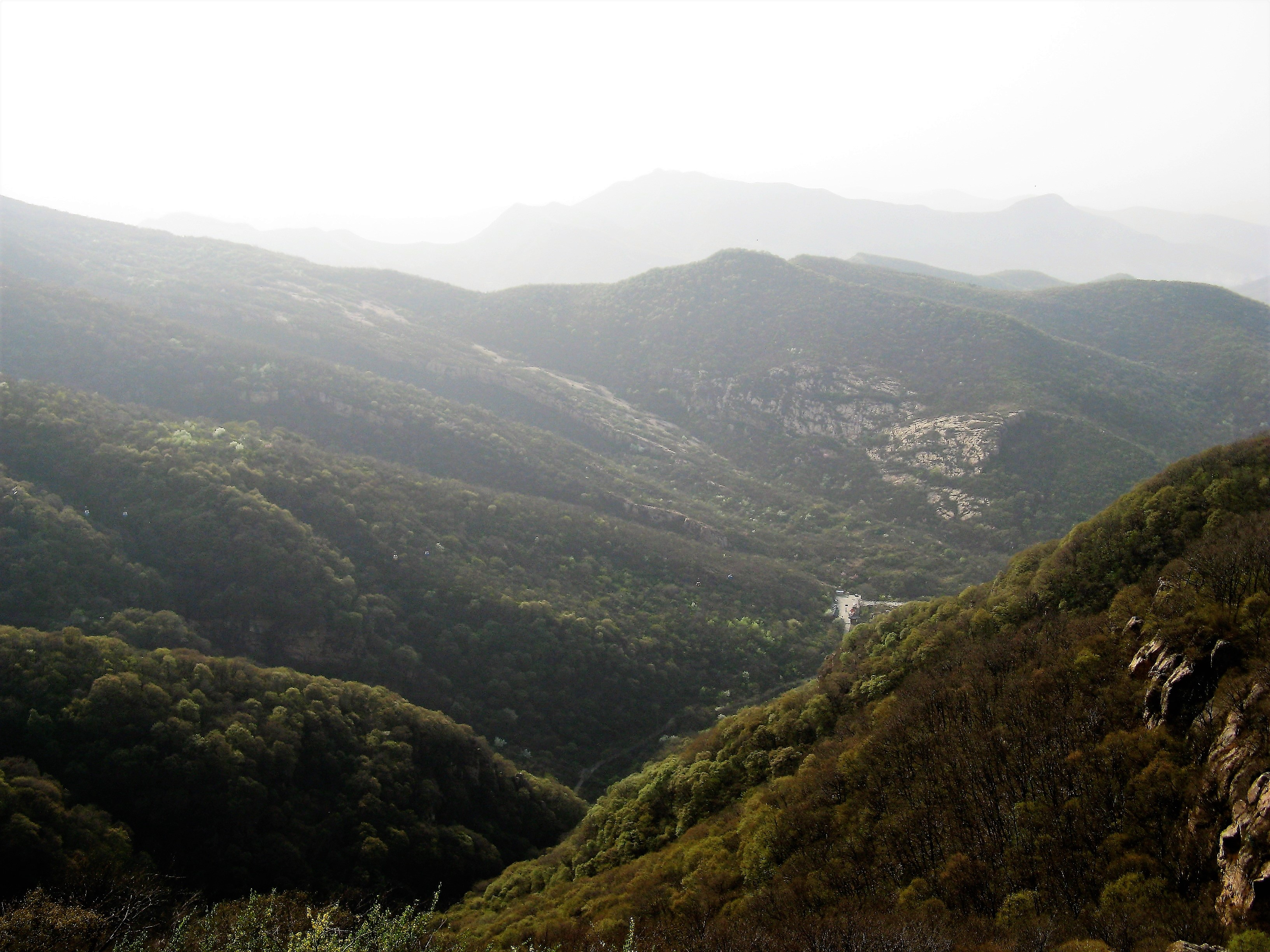
Mount Song in Henan, most commonly identified with the Mountain Power Yue

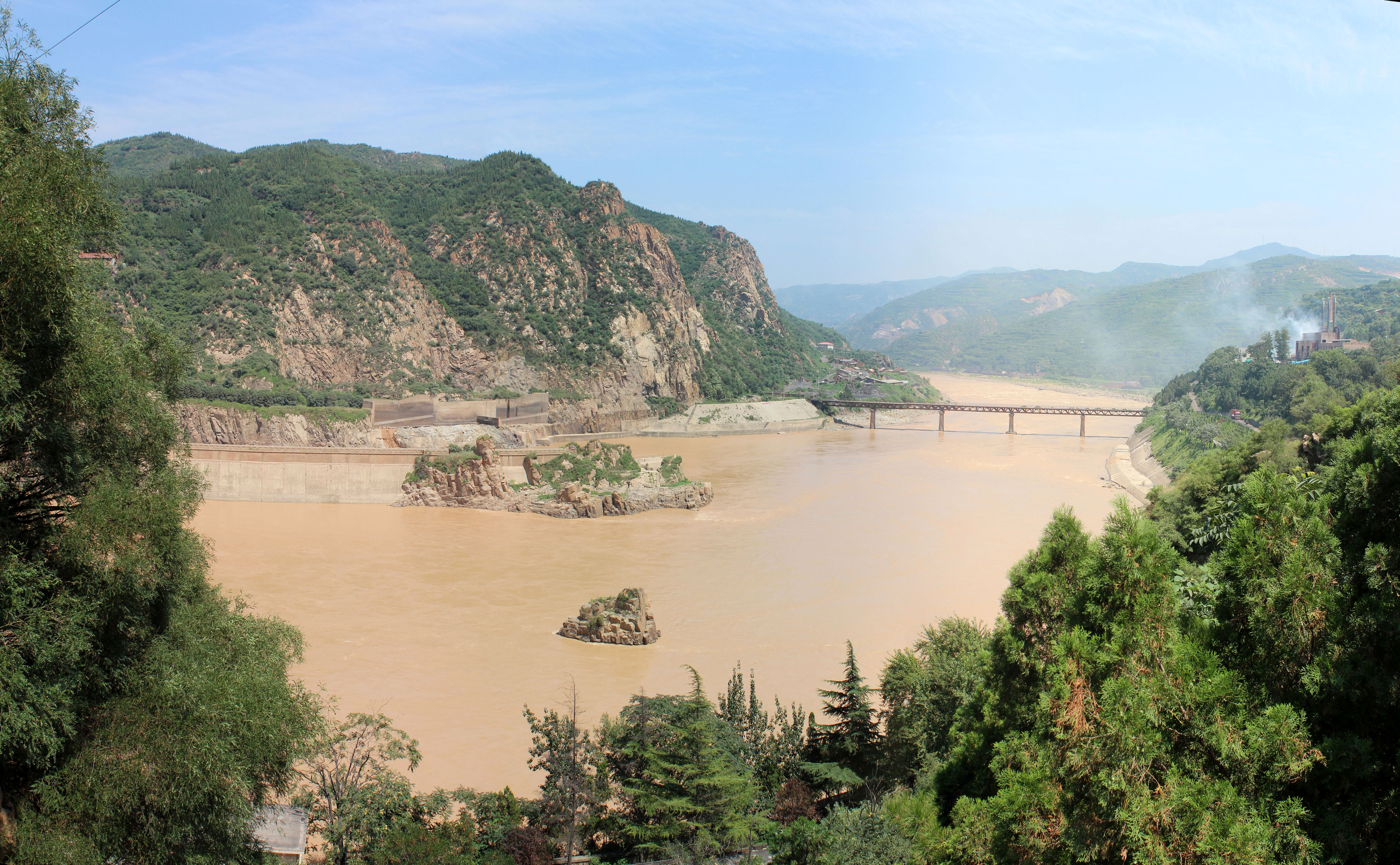
The Yellow River, worshipped by the Shang as the River Power He

Some nature powers were responsible for crop failures, which were detrimental to the Shang whose economy was based on agriculture. Such spirits include the Mountain Power Yue (岳) and the River Power He (河). He is generally interpreted as the Yellow River, and Yue as Mount Song, the principal peak of the central Henan region. Some scholars instead identify Yue as the spirit representing the Taihang Mountains to the west of the last Shang capital. Both are associated with the region of the Shang capitals prior to the move to Anyang, and there is a long-attested tradition that rulers were responsible for service to the major mountains and rivers of their territories.

Yue and He – which influenced state matters such as harvests and war – were the only nature spirits with clearly defined roles, and the Shang practice of treating them as ancestor-like deities was likely to allow them to exercise their authority together with ancestor spirits. The River Power alone among the nature powers is recorded as able to harm the king. A few inscriptions suggest that delegations were sent to make offerings to the River Power at the Yellow River itself. Whether either was regarded as an ancestor is disputed: an isolated inscription appears to name a "High Ancestor River", though this may be a fused reference to two separate powers.

Shang kings also worshipped the spirit of the Huan River, which served as a place where they conducted rituals. (Note: The river appears with the same name, Huan, on Shang inscriptions.) Oracle texts mention a certain 'Shang River' and its own river spirit, whose name may be the origin of the dynastic name itself.

=== The Earth Power ===
Recognised by the Shang, the Earth Power She (社) – or Tu (土) in Shang inscriptions – was associated with protection from misfortune, and potentially with the feminine. The identification is not secure, as in almost all occurrences the graph tu can be read without reference to a deity, as denoting territory or the outdoor sacrificial altar (she), and the one inscription that appears to treat it as a power in parallel with He and Yue may instead name the Former Lord Xiangtu (相土).

=== Wind gods and the four directions ===
Among the nature spirits were wind gods, which were associated with the four cardinal directions and the four seasons. Winds also seemed to be associated with the phoenix, which is mentioned as Di's messenger – an association reflected in the oracle bone graph for 'wind' (風; fēng), a pictograph of a bird that has been identified with the phoenix (鳳; fèng). Rituals were conducted to appease the wind gods, and to pray for successful harvests. The wind itself appears as a deity, and there are other spirits that could control winds.

Inscriptions in the Jiaguwen Heji name each direction together with its wind, in the formula "perform a di-sacrifice to the South, called Wei, its wind called Yi, requesting crops". The names given are:

The four directions and their winds
Direction	Name	Wind
East	析; Xī	劦; xié
South	𡵂; Wéi	夷; yí
West	彝; Yí	韋; wēi
North	伏; Fú	伇; yì

The two inscriptions carrying these names are not identical: Heji 14294 assigns the name Wei to the wind rather than to the direction, and reverses the pair in the case of the West, a variation not expected among fixed members of a pantheon. Matsumaru Michio has further identified 14294 as a practice or training inscription rather than the record of an actual divination, which Eno takes to indicate that the directional and wind names were basic enough to Shang culture to appear in elementary primers.

The same names recur in literature composed a millennium later, under different characters. Following Chen Mengjia, Allan aligns the Shang directional names with those of the four peoples named in the Yao dian chapter of the Book of Documents and with the four directions of the Da huang jing section of the Shanhaijing, holding that the three sets correspond even where the graphs differ, since several can be equated phonologically or semantically. The Da huang jing additionally names the east wind Jun (俊; Jùn), which Allan connects to the high ancestor Di Jun and so to the sun mythology.

That the four directions are given names strongly suggests that they were delineated members of the pantheon. Their significance within Shang religion itself is less clear: apart from the inscriptions that name them, the directional powers are almost never invoked in a sacrificial context – Eno finds only one clear instance, a sacrifice to the Power of the East – and in many other occurrences the directions can be read locatively rather than as deities.

=== Celestial spirits ===
Some inscriptions refer to gendered spirits such as the Mother of the West (西母; Xīmǔ) and Mother of the East (東母; Dōngmǔ) who respectively controlled sunset and sunrise. Some identify the two spirits as goddesses of celestial objects, while others say that they were more likely earth deities with possible origins from agricultural and fertility cults. A third proposal identifies them as antecedents of Xihe and Changxi, the consorts of Di Jun in later mythology and mothers respectively of the ten suns and the twelve moons; Eno regards the evidence for this as highly leveraged. Shang inscriptions seem to indicate the worship of a third spirit, the Central Mother (中母; Zhōngmǔ), even though some interpret it to be ancestral.

Night and dreams were possibly associated with an owl deity, with references to owls found in Shang inscriptions and art. Dance and sacrifices acted as Shang prayers to the rains. Similarly, worship of the Moon is existent but rarely seen in Shang texts.

Whether the Sun was itself a deity is disputed. Keightley identified a cult of the Sun at the core of Shang religion, to which the Shang prayed for harvests although it did not usually receive rituals. Eno counts at most about ten relevant inscriptions, all of which may equally be read as recording a rite performed at sunrise and sunset rather than one offered to the sun, and concludes that judgment should be reserved. Keightley proposed to enlarge the evidence by reading the cyclical sign ding (丁), in certain contexts, as a short form of ri (日; 'sun'), although Eno regards this as requiring further investigation.

== Ancestral spirits ==
The Shang upheld beliefs in royal ancestor spirits, most of whom were former kings and queen consorts, and these were by a wide margin the most numerous and most frequently addressed members of the pantheon. The ancestor list grew through time, as the death of each reigning king added him as an ancestor. Six Predynastic ancestor deities were recognised, beginning with Shang Jia (上甲) and collectively termed the 'Six Spirits' (六示; lìushì); the Shang dynastic line was recognised to begin with Da Yi and ended with Di Xin.

Shang royal ancestors and kings according to the oracle bones
Generation	Older brothers			Main line of descent	Younger brothers
Predynastic ancestors (Note: The six are collectively the 'Six Spirits' (六示; lìushì); the junior five, excluding Shang Jia, are the 'Lesser Spirits' (小示; xiǎoshì).)
A1				Shang Jia (上甲)	
A2				Bao Yi (報乙)	
A3				Bao Bing (報丙)	
A4				Bao Ding (報丁)	
A5				Shi Ren (示壬)	
A6				Shi Gui (示癸)	
Dynastic kings
1				Da Yi (大乙) / Tang (唐) (Note: This name is given as Tang (湯) in the Historical Records and the Bamboo Annals.) / Cheng (成)	
2				Da Ding (大丁)	
3				Da Jia (大甲)	Bu Bing (卜丙)
4				Da Geng (大庚)	Xiao Jia (小甲)
5				Da Wu (大戊) / Tian Wu (天戊)	Lü Ji (呂己)
6				Zhong Ding (中丁)	Bu Ren (卜壬)
7			Jian Jia (戔甲)	Zu Yi (祖乙) / Zhongzong (仲宗)	
8				Zu Xin (祖辛)	Qiang Jia (羌甲) (Note: The status of Qiang Jia varies over the history of the oracle bones. During the reigns of Wu Ding and the last two kings, he was not included in the main line of descent, a position also held by the Historical Records, but in the intervening reigns he was included as a direct ancestor.)
9				Zu Ding (祖丁) / Xiao Ding (小丁)	Nan Geng (南庚)
10	Xiang Jia (象甲)	Pan Geng (盤庚)	Xiao Xin (小辛)	Xiao Yi (小乙) / Xia Yi (下乙)	
11				Wu Ding (武丁)	
12		(Note: Oracle bone inscriptions (and Sima Qian's Shiji) include an older brother Zu Ji (祖己) who did not reign.)	Zu Geng (祖庚)	Zu Jia (祖甲)	
13			Lin Xin (廩辛) (Note: This king is mentioned in the oracle bones of succeeding reigns with various names: 'brother Xin', 'father Xin' and 'grandfather Xin' and in the Shiji (as Lin Xin), but not in divinations from the reigns of the last two kings.)	Geng Ding (康丁)	
14				Wu Yi (武乙)	
15				Wen Wu Ding (文武丁)	
16				Di Yi (帝乙) (Note: There is a single occurrence, albeit not dated securely, of the name Fu Yi (父乙, 'father Yi') that might refer to this king.)	
17				Di Xin (帝辛)	

Shang graph for Shang Jia

These spirits constituted what modern scholars describe as a "generational hierarchy", with the power of its members determined by seniority. Predynastic ancestors were the most powerful, with the ability to influence weather and crops, while recently dead ancestors might only cause personal trouble. Ancestor spirits could intercede with Di, and could inflict severe calamities if not appeased with the proper rituals. Shang ancestor worship possessed characteristics of an impersonalised cult, in which the spirits of dead royals were deprived of their individuality upon becoming ancestors – a feature reflected in the avoidance of direct human depiction in Shang ritual art.

=== Ancestresses ===
The Shang worshipped female ancestors alongside male ones, though on a markedly smaller scale; ancestresses were the focus of only about one-sixth of Shang rituals, and their jurisdiction appears to have been seen as limited to reproduction. Unlike the predynastic kings, neither royal consorts nor dynastic kings are recorded as influencing weather or crops.

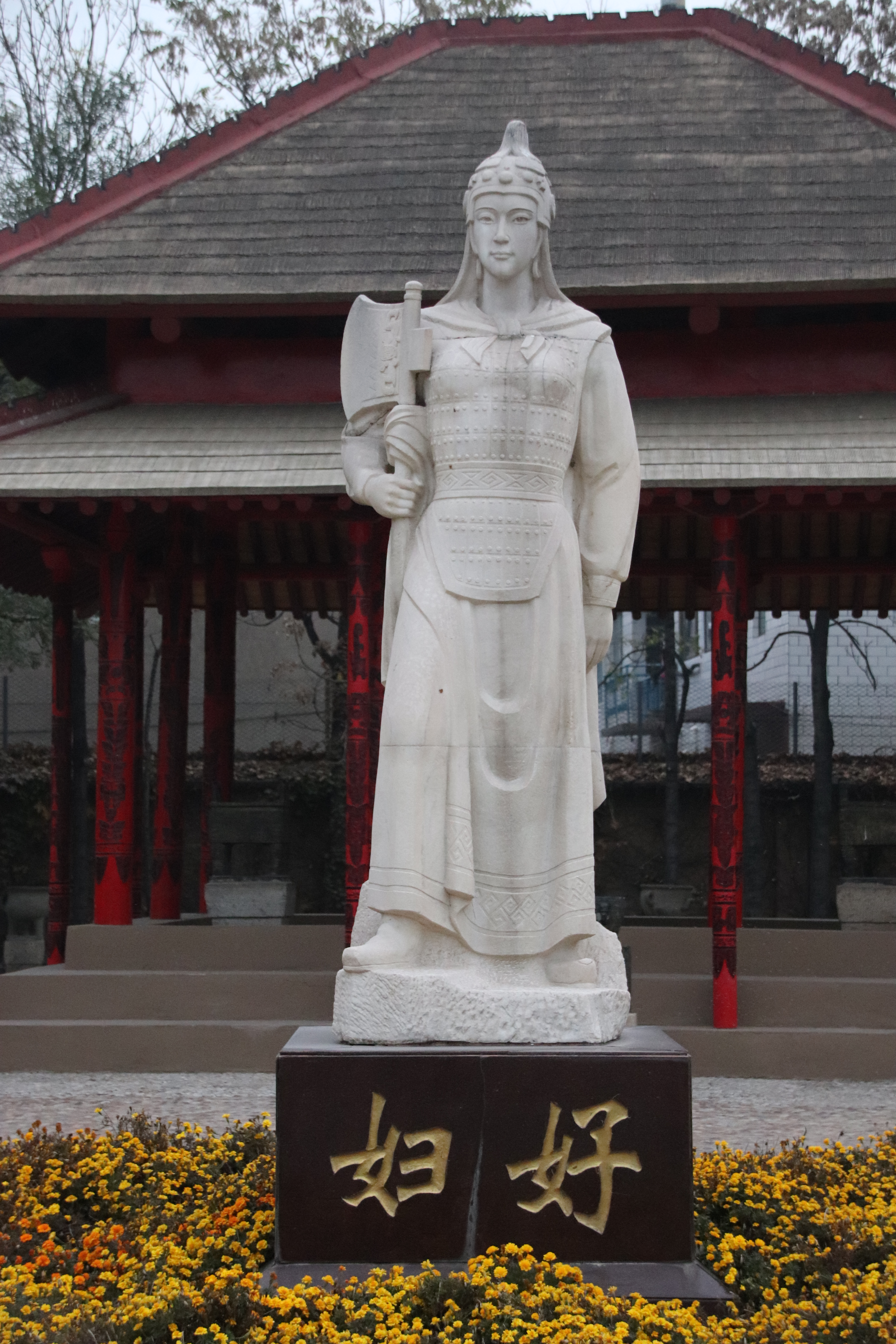
Statue of Fu Hao, one of the most prominent Shang ancestresses, posthumously honoured as Mu Xin and Bi Xin

Which consorts received cult was governed by a criterion that remains disputed. Eno holds that the ancestresses worshipped were only those who bore a son who ultimately took the throne, so that several consorts of a single king could be included where each had borne a reigning brother. Chang Yuzhi argues instead that the determining factor was not the bearing of an heir but establishment as principal consort (正后; zhènghòu). The wives of the first four predynastic ancestors were excluded in any case, and the regularised sacrificial cycle of the later reigns excluded both predynastic consorts and the mothers of kings outside the main line; the form of sacrifice assigned to ancestresses also differed from that of ancestors.

Ancestresses were nonetheless credited with real power over the living. Shang texts mention female ancestors causing the king's illness, and occasionally refer to angry and unfriendly ancestresses who would thereafter receive offerings. In divinations asking which spirit was striking the king with sickness, only three agents are ever named: Di, "those below and above" (下上; xiàshàng), and "the many consorts" (多妣; duōbǐ).

Women attested in the inscriptions include Mu Ji (母己), Bi Bing (妣丙), and most prominently Fu Hao, the consort of Wu Ding, who was referred to as Mu Xin (母辛) and Bi Xin (妣辛) after her death – the shift from mu (母) to bi (妣) marking her recession from the generation of the reigning king's mother into that of his grandmother.

== Former Lords ==
Within the Shang pantheon there existed a group of ancestor-like spirits, referred to by modern scholarship as the 'Former Lords' (先公; xiāngōng), understood as the spirits of deceased individuals regarded in some way as culture heroes. Some are clearly historical; others derive from legends whose later redactions contain clearly mythical elements; the majority have not been positively identified.

=== Wang Hai and Nao ===
Shang graph for Kui (夔), one of the two High Ancestors

Two members of the group are referred to in the inscriptions as 'High Ancestors' (高祖; gāozǔ). The first is written with a graph variously transcribed as Nao (獶), Kui (夔) or Jun (夋), and is widely identified with the figure the Shiji names as a source of the Shang lineage, Ku. (Note: None of the commonly proposed readings is phonetically compatible with ku; Wang Guowei's original transcription as jun, Ku's reported personal name, avoids the difficulty by asserting a direct identity but largely ignores the structure of the inscribed graph. Allan defends Wang's reading on the grounds that Di Jun was husband of Xihe and father of the sun-birds in later tradition, and that the figure tended to be worshipped on the xin day, Ku being known as Gao Xin Shi.)

The second is Wang Hai (王亥), plausibly identified with the figure the Shiji names as the father of Shang Jia. His name is the only one among the Shang ancestors to incorporate a character from the cycle of twelve (the Earthly Branches) rather than the cycle of ten (the Heavenly Stems), and his position is pivotal between the remote ancestors and those named by stem. In a minority of inscriptions a bird is drawn over the cyclical character hai.

The powers of these two outranked those of the highest Shang ancestors, ranging from affecting the weather to influencing the king, although they are invoked far less frequently.

=== Other figures ===
Also mentioned as Former Lords were Ji (季) and Wang Gen (王亙). The category also comprised spirits whom modern scholars identify as former Shang ministers with the postmortem ability to curse the living, such as Xue Wu, Xian Wu, Huang Yin, and Yi Yin; the latter was accompanied by a consort named Yi Shi, and was able to control rain and ensure good harvests. A position from Qiu Xigui takes Huang Yin and Yi Yin to be identical spirits.

Yi Yin is of particular interest because later Chinese accounts describe him either a commoner of exceptional ability or a defecting minister of the Xia dynasty, with no affinal link to the Shang royal house; yet his sacrifices fall consistently on the ding day, indicating a cyclical stem designation not reflected in his name, and his consort was worshipped as a power in her own right. Some scholars have accordingly argued that he was a member of a royal sub-lineage or the founder of a collateral branch, though the evidence is not compelling enough to displace the simpler interpretation that his place reflects services rendered to the state.

Also in the Shang pantheon was E (娥), who is not clearly assigned to any category, and Mo Xi, who in later literature was mentioned as a consort of the last Xia ruler Jie.

=== Political legitimation ===
Because the Former Lords stand partly outside the royal lineage, their role has been read as bearing on the legitimacy of Shang rule. Itô Michiharu suggested that they were independent deities worshipped by local cultures absorbed by the Shang in the course of state formation, whose worship the Shang assumed as a means of enhancing the legitimacy of their conquests; on this view, adopting widely revered gods as royal ancestors amounted to a claim to divine kingship. An alternative reading treats their adoption as a response to the belief, attested in later texts, that spirits do not accept sacrifices from people outside their own lineages.

== Cosmology ==
Shang cosmology viewed the cosmos as being composed of the 'four directions' (四方; sìfāng), with the king being divinely sanctioned to rule at the 'Centre Shang' (中商; Zhōng Shāng). Shang deities – Di, the nature spirits, and the ancestors – were connected together in this sifang universe, which served as an ordered medium through which Di interacted with humans. Events from the four directions were perceived as fulfillments of Di's will, making sifang cosmology a way for the Shang to understand Di and the universe.

=== The celestial pole ===
Based on Shang inscriptional evidence, some scholars point to the possibility of Di having a cosmological identity. On this interpretation the Shang believed in the divinity of the north celestial pole, and it was at the pole's surrounding square area that the High God was thought to dwell. David Pankenier and Didier arrived at this proposal independently and agree on its general form, but differ on its details.

The polar square in Shang and Zhou graphs

The Shang graph di (禘), whose rectangle Didier projects onto the stars Mizar, Thuban, Kochab, Alioth and Pherkad

The Zhou graph for Tian (天), which also carries a rectangle at the top

Pankenier observes that the true celestial pole lies in a region empty of significant stars, and projects the graph di onto the polar sky of the mid-to-late 2nd millennium BC such that its extreme points correspond to visible stars while its axes intersect at the vacant pole; he associates this with the later supreme power Taiyi. Didier welcomes Pankenier's support for a pole-centred godhead but rejects his particular projection, arguing that it does not account for the quadrilateral ding (口) element present in the graphs for Di and for several ancestral names, that the projected strokes do not follow lines of stars, and that it cannot accommodate the Zhou graph for Tian, which must derive from the same stars if the Zhou equated Tian with Di. He further disputes Pankenier's premise that the Shang abandoned the older pole star Thuban for Kochab around 1545 BC, noting that the two were then approximately equidistant from the true pole and that the weight of tradition lay with Thuban. (Note: Didier also rejects Pankenier's later identification of the stem ding with the quadrilateral of Pegasus, derived from the Shijing ode "Ding zhi fang zhong".)

Di was perceived by Didier to be composed of two components, with the upper one called Shangdi and its lower counterpart named Xiadi. Either of these two was probably a collective manifestation of Shang ancestors, and Didier identifies it to be Shangdi, which he believes to have been the part of Di associated with the polar square.

The square-like component within the character for Di possibly denoted the sifang itself. The square also appears as an independent character in Shang inscriptions (口), representing the fourth Heavenly Stem ding and signifying various ritual meanings. (Note: There is another common variation on the square graph found in inscriptions.) Posthumous names of some kings might be related to Shang cosmology, especially names with stems jia, ding and yi, which were probably projections of the celestial square.

=== Dualism and complementarity ===
A large majority of divination topics in the reign of Wu Ding were put to oracle bones as complementary pairs: a positive and a negative charge, opposed in content and placed antipodally on either side of the plastron, their inscriptions balanced as near mirror images and their pyromantic cracks deliberately symmetrical, the symmetry having been fixed in advance by the corresponding placement of the hollows chiselled into the reverse. Divinations concerning sickness, childbearing, rain, harvest, curses by ancestors or nature powers, military strategy, construction and tribute were all, on occasion, bifurcated in this way.

Keightley read the practice as evidence of a distinctive metaphysics. The Shang diviners, he argued, saw the world as "a series of balanced dualisms" in which auspicious and inauspicious outcomes – harvest and dearth, victory and defeat, flood and drought – were inextricably intertwined possibilities; the paired charges dramatised not a battle of good against evil but the symbiosis of good and bad fortune. Because both charges were potentially true they were contrary without being contradictory, and only by giving each possibility a fair hearing could a divination be equitable, in accord with reality, and therefore valid. A practical corollary followed: because the undesirable outcome had been acknowledged in advance and incised on the shell, a royal forecast that failed was not a fatal challenge to the king's standing as diviner.

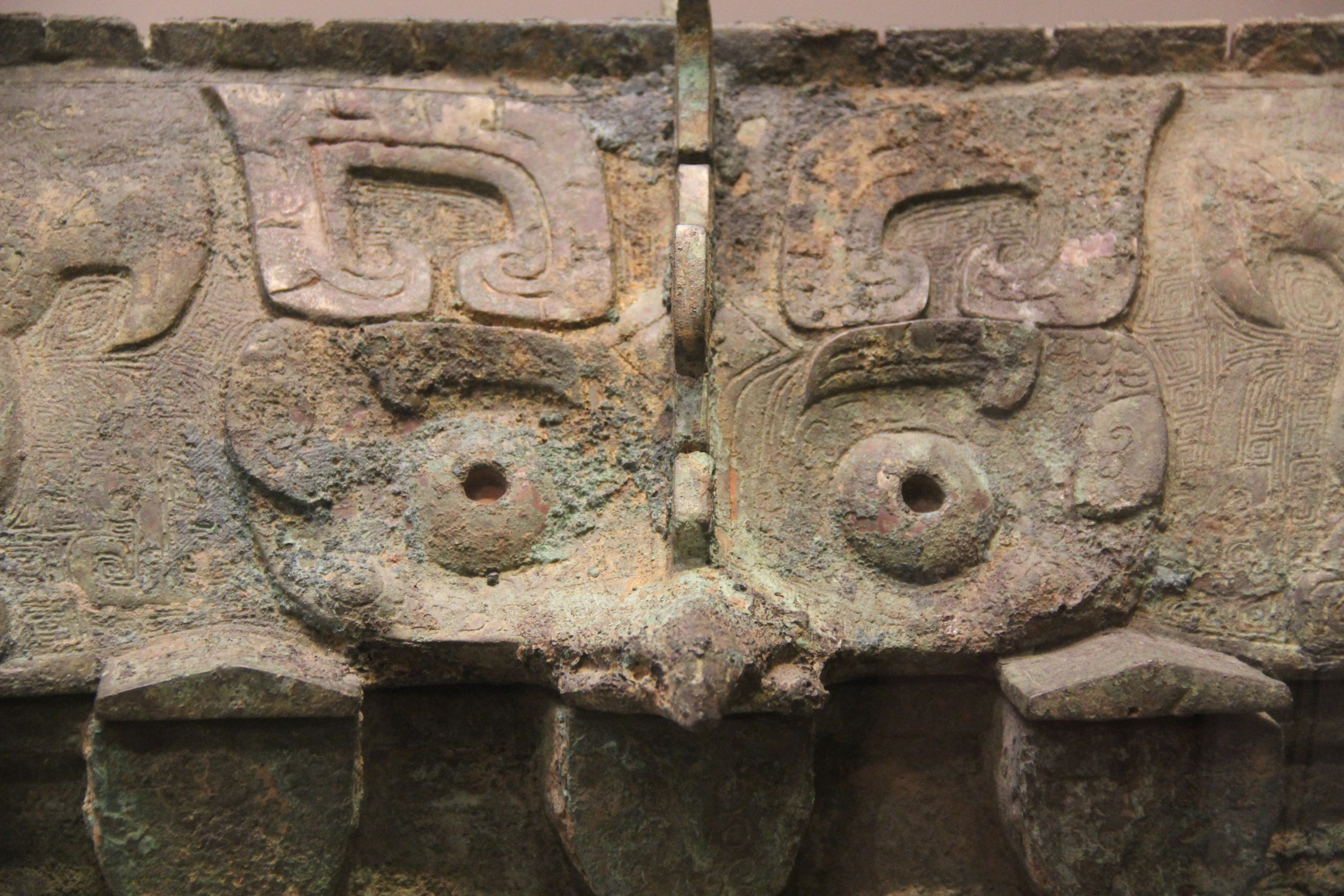
Shang bronze art depicting symmetry, reflection of a dualistic theology

The balance was, per Keightley, transitory. A divination might show it inclining one way while the opposite possibility recorded on the other half of the shell stood as a reminder of the changeable nature of reality and of the modest human role in understanding or controlling it. Shang divination was accordingly "no part of a theology of optimism", but neither did it assume a theology of tragedy; it conceived instead of "a world of alternating modes, pessimistic at times, optimistic at others, but with the germs of one mode always inherent in the other", which Keightley characterised – at least for the Wu Ding-period inscriptions – as "a metaphysics of yin and yang".

The principle was not confined to divination, as binary and symmetrical pairing is characteristic of much Shang ritual art. Keightley distinguished his reading from Lévi-Strauss's account of the union of opposites in myth, holding that the oppositions of the Shang diviner – rain or no rain, curse or no curse, harvest received or not received – are more starkly antinomical than those Lévi-Strauss adduced and by their nature permit no union, and that the complementarity of the charge pairs was explicit and intentional rather than unconscious, representing "not myth but dialectics".

== Totemism ==
Inscriptional evidence has been taken to indicate that the Shang believed in bird totemism – the practice of associating kinship between humans and birds. Most academics identify the Shang bird totem with the Xuanniao (玄鳥), a divine bird which was mentioned in later Zhou accounts as giving birth to the Shang high ancestor Xie, and some take this as an indication that the Shang considered themselves descendants of birds. However, most evidence indicates that the Shang likely worshipped general bird features rather than a particular species. It is also possible that these names represented beasts instead of birds. Aside from birds, tigers and dragons depicted on Shang bronzes have been interpreted as totems.

Eno regards the association of the Shang with birds as poorly supported by the inscriptions and the bronzes alike: the bird element over Wang Hai's name occurs in under ten percent of the relevant inscriptions, the other High Ancestor is transcribed with graphs denoting beasts, and birds occupy no privileged place among the animals depicted on ritual vessels. According to his assessment, any bird cult possibly practised by the Shang lay outside the scope covered by the oracle texts.

=== The ten suns ===
Sarah Allan contends that the Shang possessed a myth of ten suns and that the royal ancestors were organised in a totemic relationship to them, the suns in turn being identified with birds. She reconstructs the myth from the "Mulberry Tree tradition" of Zhou and Han texts, chiefly the Shanhaijing, Huainanzi and Chuci, in which ten suns rise in turn from the fusang (扶桑) tree, bathe in a pool in the Valley of the Sun, and are borne by birds, with Xihe as their mother. The better-known myth in which Archer Yi shoots nine of the ten suns presupposes these motifs and, Allan argues, served to reconcile the tradition with the Zhou belief in a single sun by relegating the ten to a mythical past.

Allan links this tradition to the Shang through their origin myth, in which the ancestor Xie is born after Jiandi swallows the egg of a Xuanniao sent by Emperor Ku, whose equivalence with Di Jun means that the bird giving birth to the Shang is the same as the bird in the suns. She adduces further associations between the Shang and the mulberry: the sanglin (桑林) altar of the successor state of Song, the drought at the Shang's founding at which Tang offered himself as a sacrifice, and the birth of Yi Yin from the Hollow Mulberry.

From the inscriptions themselves she cites the graphs for 'east' (東) and 'west' (西), read as a sun within a tree and as the nest in which the sun-birds roost; the female Mothers of the West and East as antecedents of Changxi and Xihe; a bronze dedication to a "Black Bird Lady"; and the bird drawn over Wang Hai's name. On this basis she proposes that the identification of each ancestor with one of the ten suns underlies the Shang ritual calendar, in which ancestors bearing one of the ten Heavenly Stems received sacrifice on the corresponding day, and notes that the stems are termed the 'ten suns' (十日; shí rì) in Zhou and Han texts. Although Shang inscriptions do not directly mention the ten suns, Allan suggests that this totemic tradition was implied by many later texts.

== Development and change ==
Shang religious belief as reflected in oracle bone inscriptions was not static. The corpus divides into an earlier era, comprising the long reign of Wu Ding and the brief reign of his son Zu Geng, and a later era beginning with Zu Jia and extending to the fall of the dynasty. (Note: An earlier model, proposed by Dong Zuobin, posited two contending schools alternating in influence across five periods. A re-dating of a large group of texts, first proposed by Li Xueqin in the 1970s, relocated them from the fourth period to the first, eliminating the apparent revival that the model required; scholars now recognise a single transition.)

It is only in the earlier era that the full Shang pantheon is active in the inscriptions. The High God Di appears in later texts at roughly one-seventh the frequency of the earlier era, and the River Power at a comparable rate; by the final period both have virtually disappeared from the record. In their place a regularised calendar of sacrifices to the mainline royal ancestors emerges, which by the last reigns had become the overwhelming subject of divination. The Shang also switched their worship between the Former Lords, the cult of Huang Yin prevalent under Wu Ding being replaced by that of Yi Yin under Wu Yi.

The interpretation of this contraction is disputed. Keightley described it in terms of deliberate reforms by Wu Ding's sons, particularly Zu Jia. Eno suggests instead that Wu Ding may have been the aberration – a ruler of unusually heightened concern with the spirit world, whose reign accounts for nearly 60 percent of the recovered corpus while representing at most 30 percent of its duration – and that his sons merely returned royal practice toward a pre-existing norm while retaining the innovation of written oracle notation. A third possibility is that the change concerns the status of pyromancy rather than belief, with other forms of divination coming to be used for matters of state.
