= Bao Yi of Shang =

Predynastic Shang ruler

Bao Yi 匚乙

Ruler of Predynastic Shang
- Predecessor: Shang Jia
- Successor: Bao Bing
Names
- Family name: Zi (子)
Temple name
- Bao Yi (匚乙)
- Father: Shang Jia

Bao Yi of Shang
- Chinese: 匚乙 or 報(报)乙
- Literal meaning: "Bao II"
Transcriptions
Standard Mandarin
- Hanyu Pinyin: bào yǐ
- Bopomofo: ㄅㄠˋ ㄧˇ
- Wade–Giles: pao^{4}-i^{3}
Wu
- Romanization: ^{5}pau 7iq
Yue: Cantonese
- Yale Romanization: bou^{3} jyut^{6}
Middle Chinese
- Middle Chinese: pawH 'it
Old Chinese
- Baxter–Sagart (2014): /*pˤuk-s qrət/
- Zhengzhang: /*puːɡs qriɡ/

Bao Yi (Chinese: 匚乙; pinyin: Bào Yǐ) (Note: Also written as simplified Chinese: 报乙; traditional Chinese: 報乙) was the tenth ruler of Predynastic Shang. Succeeding Shang Jia, he is regarded as one of the culture's Six Spirits (六示 (lìushì)). Veneration of him as an ancestral deity is recorded in oracle bone inscriptions, though little is known about his contemporary reign. He was succeeded by Bao Bing.

== Name ==
Bao Yi is consistently written as 匚乙 in Oracle Bone Script, where 匚 is pronounced as bào rather than fāng. In this scenario, it refers to a bao ritual sacrifice (e.g. 匚于河 - To perform a bao sacrifice to the river deity He). Keightley (1986) argues that, based on inscriptional evidence, the Heavenly Stem 乙 used in Bao Yi's name implies descent from a federation of the second of ten patrilineages, linked through marriage and consanguinity. It could also correspond to the day in which sacrifices are made to him.

In Records of the Grand Historian, Sima Qian writes Bao Yi as 報乙; 報 is a synonym in this case, as both 匚 and 報 carry the same Shang ritual meaning.

The name Bao Yi itself is a posthumous name applied to the individual; it is not necessarily the name the individual used in life, and the name was given based on the year in which his reign began; yi 乙 is one of three common stems, the others being ding 丁 and jia 甲. The name bao is somewhat disputed, with Didier (2009) positing that the name may have actually been kou 口.

== In oracle bone inscriptions ==
Bao Yi predates the Late Shang where extant oracle bone inscriptions begin, and thus no oracular inscription is contemporaneous. All mentions of Bao Yi are therefore in cases of ancestor veneration.

=== The "Three Baos" ===
Within Shang dynasty religion, Bao Yi is placed as one of the "Three Baos" 三匚, the others being Bao Bing and Bao Ding.

Occasionally, the Three Baos are sacrificed to as a group entity, often alongside the "Two Shis", Shi Ren and Shi Gui:

三匚二示卯王祭于之若有正
As for the Three Baos and Two Shis, would the Ruler dismembering individuals as sacrifice guarantee their approval and verification?

Shang Jia may also be included, such as in the following scenario:

三匚二示暨上甲𫹉王受祐 吉
If the King performs the ritual of pouring wine for the Three Baos, Two Shis, and Shang Jia, will we receive their protection? Result: Auspicious!

In Records of the Grand Historian, Sima Qian ordered the Three Baos incorrectly; Bao Ding, Bao Yi, then Bao Bing. This error was noticed and corrected by Wang Guowei upon reviewing oracle bone evidence; this was among the first instances of oracle bones being cross-referenced with received texts and confirmed that the names Sima Qian described were legitimate, but that the order was wrong. The error is noticeable upon referring to the order of the Heavenly Stems, as in the correct order, this is followed: 报乙 (Bao 2)、报丙 (Bao 3)、报丁 (Bao 4), which are also used to refer to the days in which sacrifices to each past ancestor are conducted.

=== Sacrifices ===
Each sacrifice made to Bao Yi, unless made as part of a sacrifice to the "Three Baos," was made on an yi day, corresponding to the temple name used for him. For example:

乙丑卜旅貞王賓匚乙彡無尤在七月
On the yichou day, Lǚ divinated. Test: If the ruler performs a bin ritual for Bao Yi, and does a rong sacrifice, will there be no misfortune in the seventh month?

Bao Yi is typically shown to receive modest sacrifices of oxen; for example:

X貞王賓匚乙歲一牛無尤
(someone) divinated. Test: If the ruler performs a bin ritual for Bao Yi and sui-sacrifices an ox, will there be no misfortune?

== Notes ==
Bao Yi of Shang Predynastic Shang
Regnal titles
Preceded by Shang Jia	King of Shang	Succeeded by Bao Bing
