= Shang ancestral deification =

Traditions practiced by the Shang dynasty to venerate royal ancestors

Shang designated character for the high ancestor Shangjia.

The Shang dynasty of China (c. 1600 – 1046 BCE) practiced a spiritual religion that includes veneration of deceased royal ancestors. Shang ancestors were perceived to possess divine powers ranging from trivial matters to state-related affairs, and sometimes were interpreted as a component of the Shang supreme god Di. Towards the later years of the Shang dynasty, activities of ancestral veneration became increasingly frequent compared to those of supernatural deities. The Shang dynasty organized performance of ancestral rituals into a full year with 36 weeks, intended for all deceased members of the royal clan.

Rituals were conducted by the representative of the living royal members, the Shang king, together with his bureaucratic court assistants. Usually, ceremonial performers would offer large-scale sacrifices to intended recipients in attempts to convince them to assure state welfare. Similar to the supernatural gods in the Shang's pantheon, its dead kin's spirits could exercise their power over the living realm. A spirit's power increased with seniority: more distant ancestors wielded power on the entire kingdom such as dictating agricultural successes and indirect help in wars. As such, Shang emphasized the importance of appeasing those godlike spirits for stability and development.

== History ==
=== Pre-Shang ===
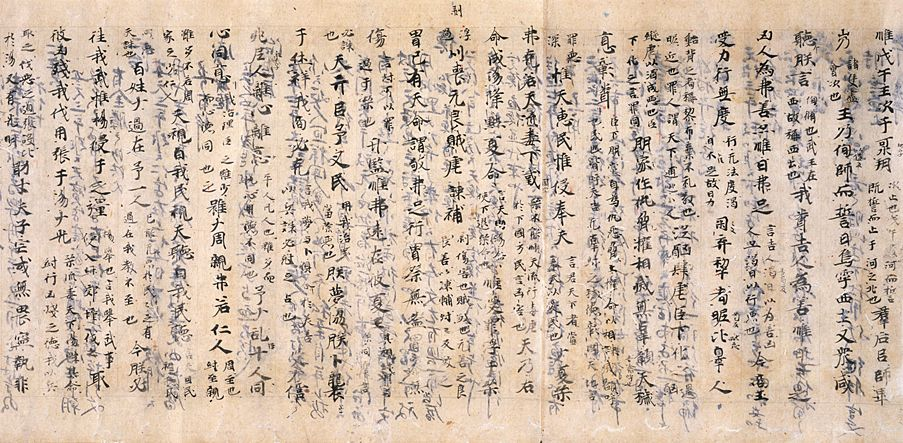
The Book of Documents.

Traditional narratives of later Chinese dynasties claim that elements of Shang theology had been practiced during previous eras, among them was ancestor veneration. The Book of Documents dedicates several chapters as the "Books of Xia", describing virtues of Xia kings. These figures often glorify the image of their preceding generations. For example, the chapter "The Songs of the Five Sons", dedicated to Tai Kang, contains a verse, the first sentences of which go:

"It was the lesson of our great ancestor,

The people should be cherished,

And not looked down upon."

— Book of Documents III.3, trans. James Legge

Yu the Great.

In another example, it is claimed that the Xia king Zhong Kang presented great virtues of Yu the Great and his successors:

"Ah! ye, all my men, there are the well−counselled instructions of the sage (founder of our dynasty [i.e. Yu the Great], clearly verified in their power to give stability and security.The former kings all were carefully attentive to the warnings of Heaven [...]"

— Book of Documents III.4, trans. James Legge

Since the Xia dynasty's existence is debated, the narrative given is not verified. However, there are signs that cultures contemporary with the Xia dynasty's alleged time frame practiced traditions that centered on dead ancestors. People living around the Yellow River valley had the practice of sacrifices and proper funerals.

=== Shang practices ===
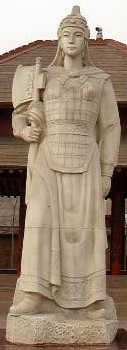
The Shang dynasty queen Fu Hao was widely revered by later generations.

Royal ancestors of the Shang dynasty were treated as godly authorities, being revered together with deities that took origins from the natural world. The ancestors received daily offerings as well as earthly inquiries. In some cases, they were not only individual spirits, but also representatives of the Shang supreme being Di and intermediaries of sacrificial rituals aimed at the being.

Shamanic practices were possible during the Shang dynasty. Some oracle bone inscriptions describe rituals in which the Shang king "took" an ancestral spirit as a "guest". Some argue that the information obtained from these oracle bones are not sufficient to conclude the presence of shamanism.

Sacrifices came in large numbers. The Shang would offer bronze, bones, animals, as well as captured humans to the spiritual world. As the tradition continued, more changes were made and by the final years of the Shang dynasty, it had developed into a complex sacrificial system, overlapping a full-Shang year. However, despite making up a large portion of court life, sacrifices at that point became "insufficient" and "mechanical". Shang kings of the late period tended to offer to their predecessors not in exchange for assistance but for mere veneration. This occurs notably during the reign of the last king Di Xin.

=== Post-Shang influences ===
The Zhou dynasty overthrew the Shang around 1046 BC, vilifying the image of Di Xin as a reason of their taking of state control. The new dynastic regime was influenced by the Shang religion and allowed direct descendants of the Shang royal family to continue ancestral veneration traditions in Song.

Ancestor deification and veneration was practiced by many Chinese royal and imperial dynasties up to the modern era. In the present day, Confucian thoughts on emphasizing the importance of ancestors still have profound impacts on Chinese folk religions.

=== Zhou dynasty evaluation ===
The Zhou dynasty blamed Di Xin of Shang for being impious and cruel, portraying him as no longer suitable to be a ruler and justifying its right to rule "All under Heaven". The Zhou accused Di Xin of neglecting rituals dedicated to Shang progenitors, thereby losing the ancestors' support. The Book of Documents records the Western Overlord Ji Fa's speech just before the decisive Battle of Muye, condemning the Shang king's failure in satisfying the honorable Shang spirits:

The king (then) said, 'The ancients have said, "The hen does not announce the morning. The crowing of a hen in the morning (indicates) the subversion of the family." Now Shou [Di Xin's personal name], the king of Shang, follows only the words of his wife. In his blindness he has neglected the sacrifices which he ought to offer, and makes no response (for the favours that he has received); he has also cast off his paternal and maternal relations, not treating them properly. They are only the vagabonds from all quarters, loaded with crimes, whom he honours and exalts, whom he employs and trusts, making them great officers and high nobles, so that they can tyrannize over the people, and exercise their villainies in the cities of Shang.

— Book of Documents, "The Speech at Mu", trans. James Legge

After its establishment, the Zhou royal clan kept the worshiped spirits of their preceding dynasty as honorable figures. Many Zhou famed people were compared with figures during the Shang dynasty, such as King Cheng of Zhou and his regent-uncle Duke of Zhou, whose relations were analogous to the Shang ruler Tai Jia and chief minister Yi Yin. In classical texts of the ancient era, Shang (and other different) dynastic rulers who purportedly emphasized on venerating his predecessors were viewed as righteous, gentle monarchs. Similar to Shang, the Zhou also practiced honoring their own ancestral spirits, especially King Wen and King Wu.

Bloody human sacrificial rituals that were conducted was not important to the Zhou, and left no trace in their traditional historiography. Initially, Zhou kept human sacrifice in their rituals, but these were later abandoned, the human victims being replaced by man-made figurines.

== Beliefs in ancestral powers ==
=== Six Spirits ===
The "Six Spirits" belong to the Predynastic Shang ancestors, composed of six beings arranged in six generations before the first Shang king Tai Yi. They are: Shang Jia (1st generation), Bao Yi (2nd generation), Bao Bing (3rd generation), Bao Ding (4th generation), Shi Ren (5th generation), and Shi Gui (6th generation). Among of the six, Shang Jia was the highest, commonly interpreted to be identical with Di; meanwhile, the remaining five were commonly referred to as the "Lesser Spirits". The "Six Spirits" appear frequently on Shang oracle bones, where they receive considerable numbers of sacrifices. The Shang believed in their ability to affect the economy, which was based on agriculture, by controlling the climatic phenomena. Such abilities distinguish the "Six Spirits" from less distant dynastic ancestors, whose powers were more limited, and make them more associated with Shang weather spirits. The six ancestors were additionally perceived to be indirect supporters in Shang's battles with neighboring polities.

Shang Jia's identification with Di was possible and might have been used to "deify" kingship of the royal family. The Shang oracle bone script grapheme for the individual includes the squared component known as the representation of the Celestial Polar Square, which housed the divine identity of Di. The other component of the oracle character is postulated to be the equivalent of the modern word "shang" (上, "above"), which further supports the ancestor's identity.

=== Dynastic deceased kin ===
The Shang dynasty revered dynastic kin of both genders. Rituals were dedicated to previous kings and their royal consorts. Contrary to their predynastic counterparts, these ancestors often only involved themselves in the reigning king's personal matters. Nearest predecessors of the Shang king would be responsible for his health, and that sacrifices would be delivered to them to ensure their protection. David Keightley reconstructed a ritual happening during Wu Ding's reign, in which the king suffered from a toothache and attempted to receive a treatment from his uncle Pan Geng. In another case, Wu Ding asked his (deceased) father Xiao Yi to cure a stomach ailment. Female ancestors seem to be responsible for more negative events. Many Shang inscriptions mention the king, or a relative of his, encountering "disasters" sent by consorts of long-dead previous monarchs. Usually, the Shang carried out sacrifices for female spirits after such ominous predictions. On the other hand, females also affected childbirth. Some individuals were offered sacrifices and prayed for a consort's conception of male offspring.

Towards the last decades of the Shang period, divinations and sacrifices were made primarily for veneration and unlikely to request assistance from the recipients. David Keightley suggested that this might reflect the change in perception of ancestral influences.

=== Identity of ancestral spirits ===
==== Cosmological divinity ====
Many oracle bone inscriptions show that Shang royal ancestors cannot be interpreted and understood by simply looking at the royal line. In fact, ancestral spirits have strong connections with the other section of the Shang's pantheon, the gods of non-ancestral origins. Shang Jia (上甲), the most senior member in Shang royal lineage, was represented on oracle bones by the square component drawn out of the character for "jia", which resembles a "plus" sign. Since the cross represents the "jia" stem, the square must denote "Shang". The square (口) has already been understood to be the source of supreme divinity, and the residence of Shangdi's power. The inclusion of 口 in Shang Jia's name would, therefore, relate him to Shangdi, creating a connection between the utmost progenitor of the Shang royal family and the supreme deity of the natural world. Three of the Six Spirits bear the character "Bao" which in oracle bone texts takes the form of 口 with the left side of the square missing. Scholars have postulated that to the Shang, the "Bao" actually was the "口".

The "口" was additionally used in combination of posthumous titles. In such cases, its meaning is the Heavenly Stem "ding". John C. Didier has presented a theory claiming that "口" was a phonetically borrowed word for an oral pronunciation of what was actually the "ding" stem. Furthermore, studying the ding-derived character "頂", which means "above" and "top", he further argued for the Stem representation of a character whose original notion was related to celestial and divine authority. Didier projected the squared form as consisting of five stars surrounding the ecliptic pole at the time of the Shang dynasty, taking Thuban as a referential object. That area was believed by the Shang to be the source of Di's power, and hence ascribing "口" to ancestors in their posthumously conferred names elevated them to the level of "true gods", hence polishing the image of the royal family.

==== Components of a cult-receiving spiritual power ====
In various inscriptional contexts, the square 口 was interpreted as collectively many spirits, particularly ancestral spirits. Didier also noted that in those contexts, 口 was far more authoritative than any individual ancestral spirits, especially because even rituals dedicated to a high ancestor like Shang Jia was reported to the "口".

Shangdi ruled over Shang ancestors, and the god actually seemed to be constituted of those spirits. He made himself accessible by manifestation of such spirits, who received sacrifices from the human realm. The character "di"' even features itself in the posthumous name of the last two Shang kings, suggesting a possible identification.

Although the "口" character only appears independently as a character in the stem "ding", it nevertheless features itself in many other stems. Didier counted fifteen Shang royal ancestors whose posthumous names include this square, of whom thirteen were ancestors in the main lineage. Because a kind of sacrifice named "口" was almost only offered to ancestors of the main descent line, it suggests a strong connection between those spirits and 口. Since this square was an important, and – in some cases – indispensable component of the character "Di", main-line ancestors must have been seen as constituting a generic Di. In other words, 口 was a central body of Di and consisted of all high Shang ancestors. This also explains significantly large portions of "口" sacrifices offered to them.

==== Ancestral and tribal spirits ====
The Shang dynasty ruled over many peoples. As it interacted with people in newly obtained lands, it gradually embraced spirits of those peoples into their own cult-receiving spiritual world. This is interpreted as an essential action to establish firm control over state-appointed regional governors, who were themselves former chiefs of conquered lands. Those spirits, in Shang scripts, were conventionally called the "Former Lords". A figure among them, called "Kui" was often referred to as "High Ancestor". Such incorporation of outside spirits into the level of Shang ancestors was effective in maintaining kingship.

This kind of worship indicates that there was possibly no discrete distinction between Shang progenitors and spirits of the king's patrilineal ascendent and spirits with no consanguine relations. The word "ancestor" could be applied to refer to both kinds. That, some argued, would challenge the view that the Shang religion was solely dedicated to the royal clan; instead, a more complex explanation would have to be given.

The fact that the word "Shangdi" only appears in three occasions while "Di" alone features in most cases seems to point out that the two words are not complete equivalents. According to Didier, "Shangdi" was only a component of "Di"; furthermore, he claimed that Shangdi was exclusively used by the Shang to refer to a collection of all Shang main-lineage ancestors, deriving from the fact that "Shangdi" has the same first character as the first Shang predynastic ancestor Shang Jia. Continuing to argue, Didier pointed out that there were several versions of the character "Di" which include three dashes at the top, in contrast to only two dashes from other forms. His theory illustrate the possibility of the three-dash form to depict "Shangxiadi", indicating the existence of Shangdi's counterpart "Xiadi". Xiadi was therefore composed of adopted tribal spirits, and together with Shangdi formed the complete supreme deity of the Shang dynasty: "Di".

== Deifying practices ==
=== Posthumous naming and addressing ancestors ===
==== Heavenly Stems ====
The Shang kings and their kin were not addressed by their personal names after death. Instead, a system of posthumous names was used for reference. Kings and queens would be conferred names after the Heavenly Stems, which consist of ten characters denoting ten days in a conventional Shang week (xun 旬). The common arrangement starts with jia (甲), followed by yi (乙), bing (丙), ding (丁), wu (戊), ji (己), geng (庚), xin (辛), ren (壬), ending with gui (癸) as the weekend. Some kings were named, extraordinarily, frequently after particular Stems. For example, up to 6 or 7 individuals shared ding in their posthumous title; the same goes with jia and yi. The three Stems are thought to have been projected from the Celestial Square and its components (in Shang inscriptions, they resemble the square or the ecliptic pole which bisects the shape). Since the Square was associated with Di, naming the ancestors frequently after such characters would further "deify" them.

Apart from regular use of certain days, scholars have observed several other implicit rules in naming a deceased person. According to the rules, choosing a Stem for a king would be subject to some restrictions:

- Conventionally, the first day of a dead king's first year of reign would dictate his posthumous title. For example, David Nivison determined that Pan Geng formally assumed the throne on 17 January 1292 BCE, a gengyin day, and so his posthumous name "Pan Geng".
- Shang kings never used the Stem "gui". Some interpret this as a taboo, since it coincides with the name of the last one among the "Six Spirits". In case the first day of a king's rule dictated the "gui", the next day "jia" would be used as substitute. For example, Wu Ding's son Zu Jia assumed power on a gui day and his title was replaced. This is theorized by Nivison (1999) to be because Shi Gui, Tang of Shang's father, used this stem.
- A king could not repeat a stem already used by his predecessor. In case of coincidence, a different day was used.

Contrary to the kings, their spouses' posthumous names are not known to follow specific rules. It is currently understood that a royal wife's title would never be the same as that of her kingly husband. The rules above seem to not affect the case of women: in fact, many of them bear the Stem "gui".

==== Indicatives of generation ====
There were comparably more kings and queens than Heavenly Stems; therefore, the Shang dynasty created a system of prefixes that indicate the concerned ancestor's gender as well as generation. Often, the terms of the system are translated as "mother", "father", "grandmother", and "grandfather". However, those terms had a much broader notion during the Shang dynasty. A full list of meanings goes as:

- zu (祖) was used to refer to the ruling monarch's grandfather or a patrilineal great-uncle.
- bi (妣) referred to both the king's grandmother and other consorts of his grandfather.
- fu (父) denoted the king's father or uncles.
- mu (母) indicated the mother or other consorts of father.

In oracle bone texts, these indicatives were written in combination with a Heavenly Stem to directly address the intended recipient. Since the words used by the Shang have boarder meanings, it is difficult to differentiate between one king's parents, grandparents and other individuals. Instead, studies to determine direct ancestors of a Shang monarch use records of Shang kinship from later dynasties.

==== Other indicatives ====
Kings whose Stem-component in posthumous names appear for the first time in the king list were often given other indicatives such as "da" (大, "big") and "tai" (太, "great") in addition to their generational titles. For example, Tai Wu was recorded on oracle bones as Da Wu, since he was the first to bear the "wu" stem.

=== Sacrificial rituals ===
==== Five scheduled sacrifices ====
Table 1. Sacrificial schedule during the reign of Wen Ding, Di Yi and Di Xin (c. 1120 – 1050 BCE)
Week	S1 sacrifice	S2 sacrifice	S3 sacrifice	S4 sacrifice	S5 sacrifice
Week 1	Full announcement of S1 sacrifice				
Week 2 – Week 11	Performance of S1 sacrificial rituals				
Week 12		Full announcement of S2 sacrifice			
Week 13		Performance of S2 sacrifices	Full announcement of S3 sacrifice		
Week 14		Performance of S2 sacrifices	Performance of S3 sacrifices	Full announcement of S4 sacrifice	
Week 15 – Week 22		Performance of S2 sacrifices	Performance of S3 sacrifices	Performance of S4 sacrifices	
Week 23			Performance of S3 sacrifices	Performance of S4 sacrifices	
Week 24				Performance of S4 sacrifices	
Week 25					Full announcement of S5 sacrifice
Week 26 – Week 35					Performance of S5 sacrifices
Week 36	Rest week				

The Shang dynasty developed a schedule for offerings which overlaps a full year of 36 weeks. Towards the reign of Wen Ding, Di Yi and Di Xin, sacrifices became more mechanically conducted. Five weeks would be spared for announcing sacrifices, commonly called gong dian (工典). Men responsible for offerings would make a presentation of intended recipients, types of sacrificial material used and other matters. There were five kinds of sacrifice: ji, zai, xie', yong, and yi; some argue that the ji type was the first to be performed in a typical year (S1). All five kinds would be performed for ten weeks each, with one week might have more than one sacrifice conducted. The last 36th week was a "rest week", before resetting sacrificial cycles.

These five types of conducted rituals differ from one another, despite being carried out in honor of the same recipients. The rong (肜) rites involved a kind of musical performance with drums, while the yi (翌) rites were accompanied by feather dances. The other three did not involve music but sacrificial food. In the ji (祭), animal meat was offered to the ancestors. The zai rites {(才/隹)*丸} offered meat-free grain meals, and xie rites (劦/口) had different kinds of meals being sacrificed.

Using both records from Huang and Chu, two Shang scribes living in different periods, Adam D. Smith discovered several principles in arranging sacrifice for ancestors:

- Stem name of a recipient dictated the day he or she received sacrifices.
- No two kings or consorts were offered on the same day. Meanwhile, a king and another's wife could occupy the same position. There is an exception in which two consorts received sacrifice on the wu day of the 10th week. Smith explained that that week ended a sacrifice's duration, and there were no available slots for separation.
- The first generations of kings would receive sacrifice first, then the schedule went by order of succession.
- Wives fill the slot after their spouses, and after previous kings' consorts had all received their offerings. (Note: Smith found out that there existed an exception for this rule. In the texts written by Huang, there were two cases in which two royal consorts filled slots not compliant with rules due to a lack of other suitable slots for them.)

==== Sacrificial changes ====
In Zhou dynasty official narrative about its preceding dynastic regime, some changes are thought to have taken place regarding religion. Allegedly, Wu Ding was the first to make modifications to sacrificial activities. According to the narrative, the king, advised by his son Zu Ji, sought to limit ancestral sacrifices after receiving ominous omens, intended to be not "generous".

Oracle bone script record Wu Ding's other son Zu Jia as the one who changed sacrificial amounts. He increased offerings to ancestors only, while critically cut down offerings to supernatural gods.

=== Funerary practices ===
==== Tomb belongings of deceased kin ====
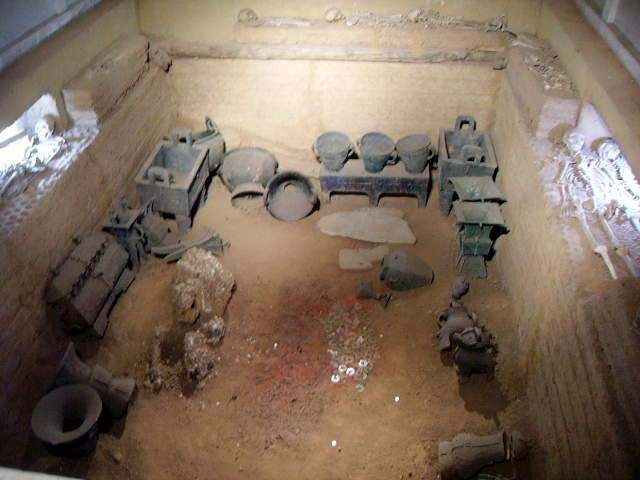
Tomb of Queen Fu Hao, around 1200 BCE.

A royal member would be interred in a designated tomb with many sacrificial items accompanying. For example, at the Tomb of Fu Hao, archaeologists have unearthed many ceremonial bronze vessels, on which various inscriptions about the queen appeared. The inscriptions often describe Fu Hao's attributed activities in military and religion.

Animal burials were prevalent during this period. At the beginning of the Shang dynasty, animal buried with humans in the Central Plains became widely popular. The Shang's buried ones were different from its Neolithic predecessors, which used pig mandibles instead of animal limbs. In the pre-Yinxu city of Zhengzhou, there are Shang tombs for the elite class containing dogs interred together with high-quality bronzes. In the middle Shang period, 38 of the 112 burials at the Taixi (台西) site in Gaocheng (藁城) contained animal sacrifices, including limbs and whole animals. However, only when the Yinxu era began did animal sacrifices become institutionalized in large scales. These traditions were gradually spread into other regions, and continued to be practiced after the Shang dynasty's collapse. The Late Shang practitioners at Yinxu buried animals in four different ways, reflecting different associations with each type of offering.

Human burial was not uncommon during the Shang dynasty. Some tombs of royal kin contain large numbers of human victims sacrificed to the lords. Some humans were decapitated and laid on the ramps within the tombs, while others were designated to be buried directly in the burial pits of their masters. These humans had two positions available to accompany the tomb owner. They were either laid on "waist-pits" below the dead person's coffin, or placed in their own coffins at the side of the lord. Many types of people were subject to sacrifices, including royal servants, guardians, concubines and charioteers, numbered up to hundreds of people in a single tomb. At the last Shang capital city Yin, more than 3,000 human remains have been unearthed and identified as sacrifices. Shang oracle bone script mention sacrificial numbers that sum up to more than 10,000.

==== Tomb positions ====
The Shang dynasty developed a complex viewpoint of tomb building, and the layout of their works was dictated by the status of the person buried. The largest place for the "afterlife" lay in the Royal Cemetery, located in what is now Xibeigang (西北岡), Anyang. The site, located in the ancient capital city of Yin, served as the resting place for almost all royal family members. Several tombs also served for the purpose of rites, mostly as honorary temples where scheduled offerings were conducted to the person interred.

Studying the cemetery's overall structure, scholars also pointed out that the tombs' positions harmoniously aligned with the northern celestial pole, which housed the power of the ancestors in the form of a collective Shangdi.

Using radiocarbon dating and other techniques, researchers have constructed a list of genealogy of the individuals buried. The study reports of Koji Mizoguchi and Junko Uchida, published in 2018, reveal that the Royal Cemetery's tombs were intended to be built in a complex manner that indicates the buried individuals' relationships to each other. Apart from several exceptions, tombs of later kings were constructed in a position that was "respectful" towards his predecessors. In that way, attendants at the funeral of a king or queen would be paying nominal respect to remote ancestors in other tombs. Some graves bear striking resemblances, which the authors interpreted as attempts to imitate virtuous royal ancestors by the kings. (Note: Tomb of Wen Ding has identical designs compared to that of his ancestor Wu Ding. Apparently, this was an attempt of Wen Ding, who sought to revitalize the then-weakened Shang dynasty by imitating Wu Ding, under which the kingdom flourished.)

===== Respect to Pan Geng, Xiao Xin and Xiao Yi =====
Tombs 1001 (Xiao Yi's), 1550 (Zu Ji's) and 1400 (Wu Ding's) were slightly southern of those two pre-existing tombs. Each of the three tombs had their main entrance on the southern side; by this design, they caused the mourners of the three deceased individuals to pay respect to the deceased of 1443 and 50WGM1 (Pan Geng and Xiao Xin). Regarding Zu Ji's tomb, the mourners were also made to pay respect Zu's grandfather Xiao Yi. A similar situation occurs in the relationship between tombs 1443 and 1400: a participant at the funeral of 1400 would have had tomb 1443—probably represented by an ancestral shrine or a very low platform—within view. This implies a strong impression and admiration of later Shang generations for the three brothers, especially the first two.

===== The case of Zu Geng =====
Tomb of Zu Geng was constructed northwestern of Xiao Yi's, as if deliberately placing the deceased so as to be paid respect by Xiao Yi (as well as Zu Ji). Additionally, the grave was placed with the clear intention of displaying the genealogical proximity of the king to his own grandfather – a peculiarity regarding Shang veneration of previous generations. Apparently, the intention was to both indicate the genealogical succession of Zu Geng to his grandfather, while also express his proximity to the latter. Construction of Zu Geng's grave also followed a design that made it on a "pairing" position with Zu's own father Wu Ding. The unique location of this tomb is an obvious example that does not comply with the conventional designation of other tombs.

===== Absence of Di Xin's tomb =====
On 20 January 1046 BCE, the last Shang king Di Xin lost the decisive Battle of Muye in which his forces was crushed by the Overlord of the West, Ji Fa. Di Xin set fire to his palace and committed suicide. The fact that he was not buried in accordance with Shang's tradition was due to his immoral and impious images made up by the Zhou dynasty.

== Temples ==
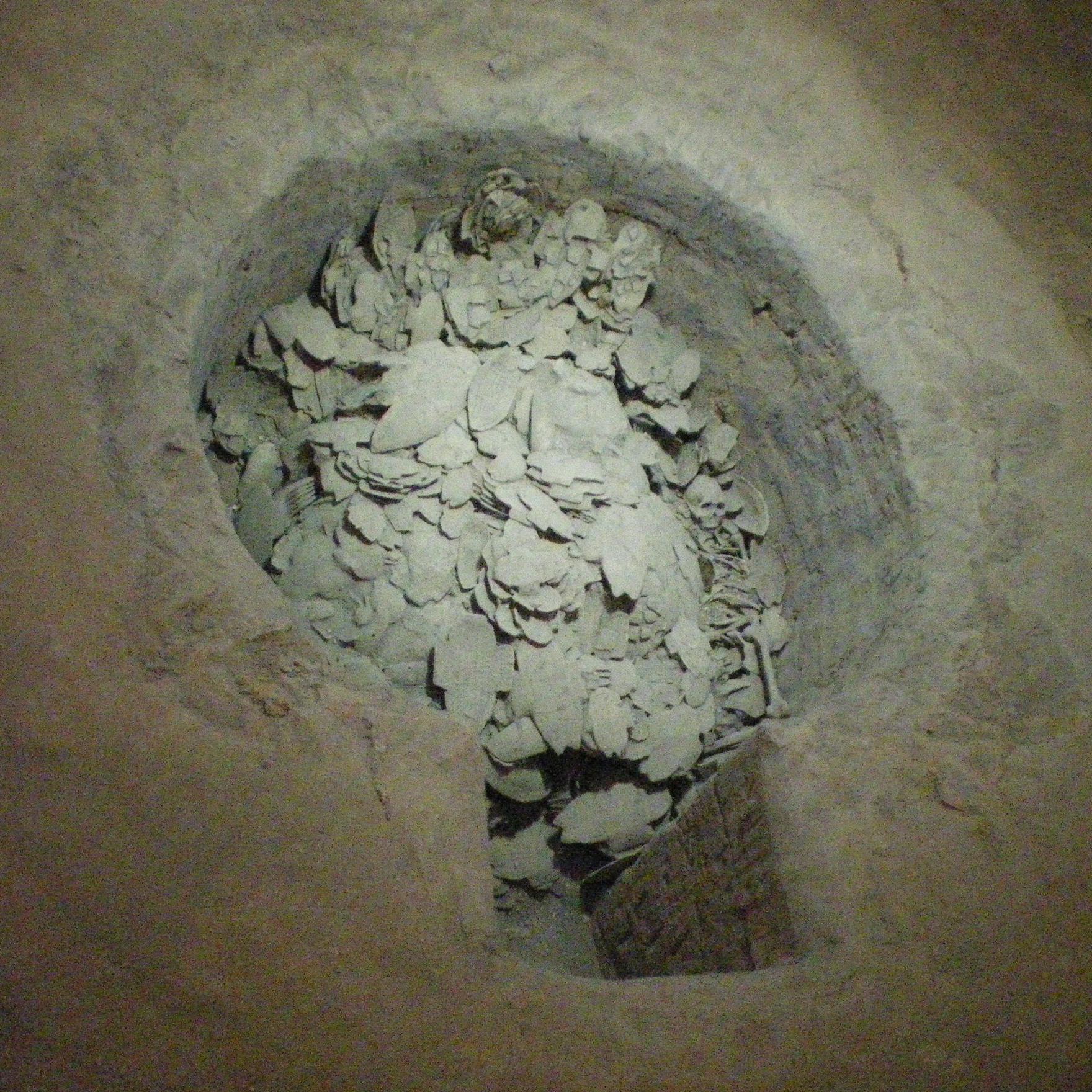
Burial pits of bones at a Shang sanctuary.

The Shang dynasty dedicated many temples ̣(and altars) for veneration of ancestral deities. Most of the temples were designed in a squared form, consistent with the role of the Celestial Square in the ancestors' spiritual identity. Many scholars assert that this square was also used linguistically to denote the Shang words for ancestral temples. Chen Mengjia saw in the square the connotation of an ancestral altar, which could also extend to "incomplete squares" like the designs found in three Shang predynastic spirits' titles. An alternative speculation claims that the square was an equivalent of the modern "beng" (祊), depicting fundamentally a gate of an altar / temple and extended to mean an entire construction. Meanwhile, Wang Guowei offered that "口" basically bore resemblances to ancestral tablet (dan 匰) or an ancestral altar or shrine (shi 祏), pointing out at the "unmistakable" squared shapes of both characters. There was a particular temple, addressed the "dashi" (大示) which is postulated to be the altar that housed all main-lineage ancestors in hosting ceremonies, and possibly other mysterious deities.

Honorary ceremonies were carried out in these constructions. Chen Mengjia believed that the "beng" (祊) ritual, an ancestral ritual performed by the Zhou dynasty, to be an equivalent of the Shang squared character due to its phonetic component "fang" denoting a square. This beng was further postulated to mean an announcing ceremony to Shang ancestors (bao 報, which is the very component in "Bao Bing", "Bao Yi" and "Bao Ding"). The Shang also wrote of a dashi ritual conducted in the corresponding sanctuary.

Practically, ancestral rituals involve many Shang practitioners, headed by the king himself. He acted as the mediator between spirits and humans, communicating with his predecessors through different means. This was seen as an essential prerogative for the monarch, as his ancestors' satisfaction depended on ritualized communications headed by him as head of the royal lineage. Some Shang characters for temple rituals, in fact, depict the king, wearing mediator masks, kneeling in front of the sacred altars. These ceremonies were scheduled and additionally recorded by inscribers.

== Gallery ==
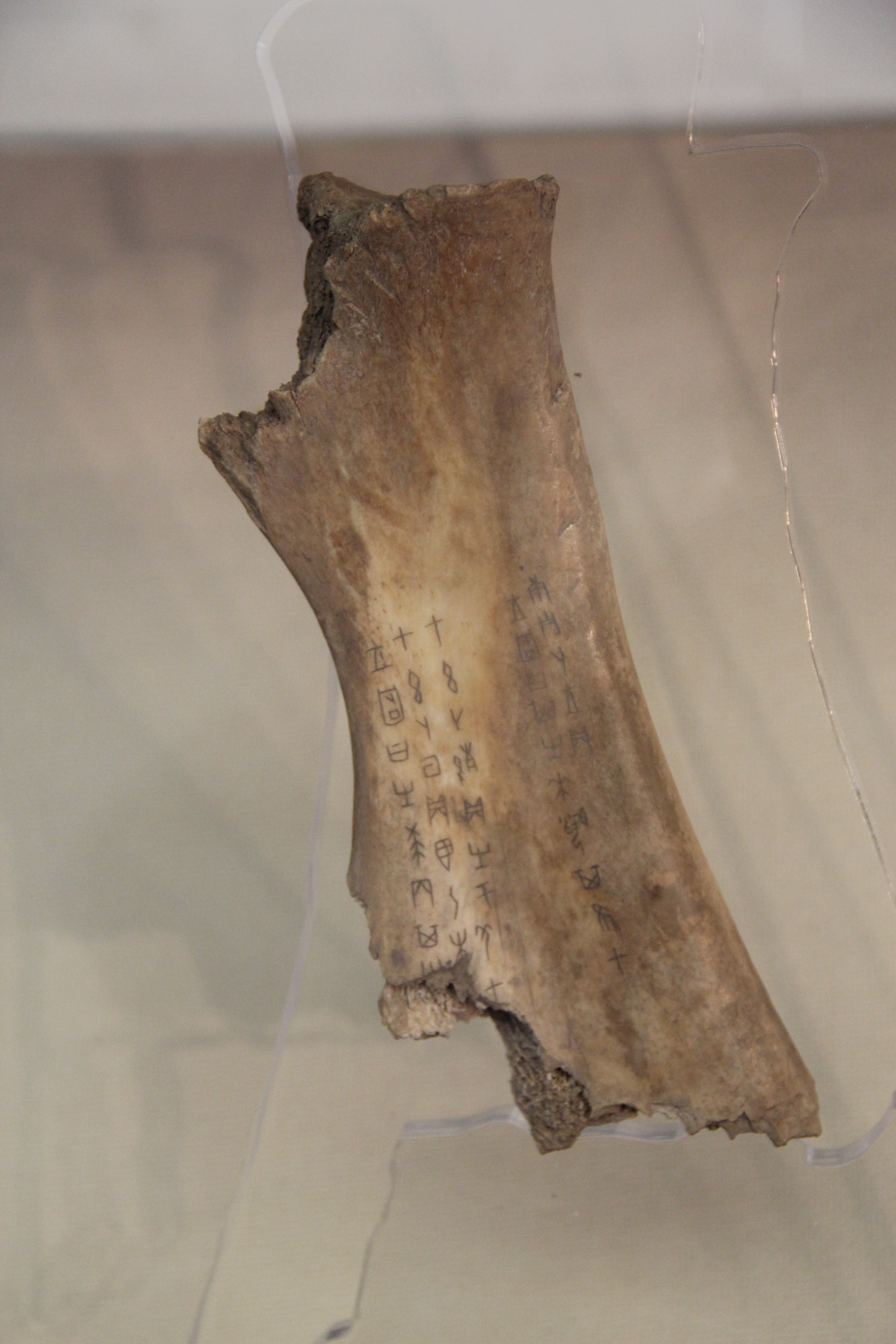
Ox scapula at Yinxu containing Shang script.

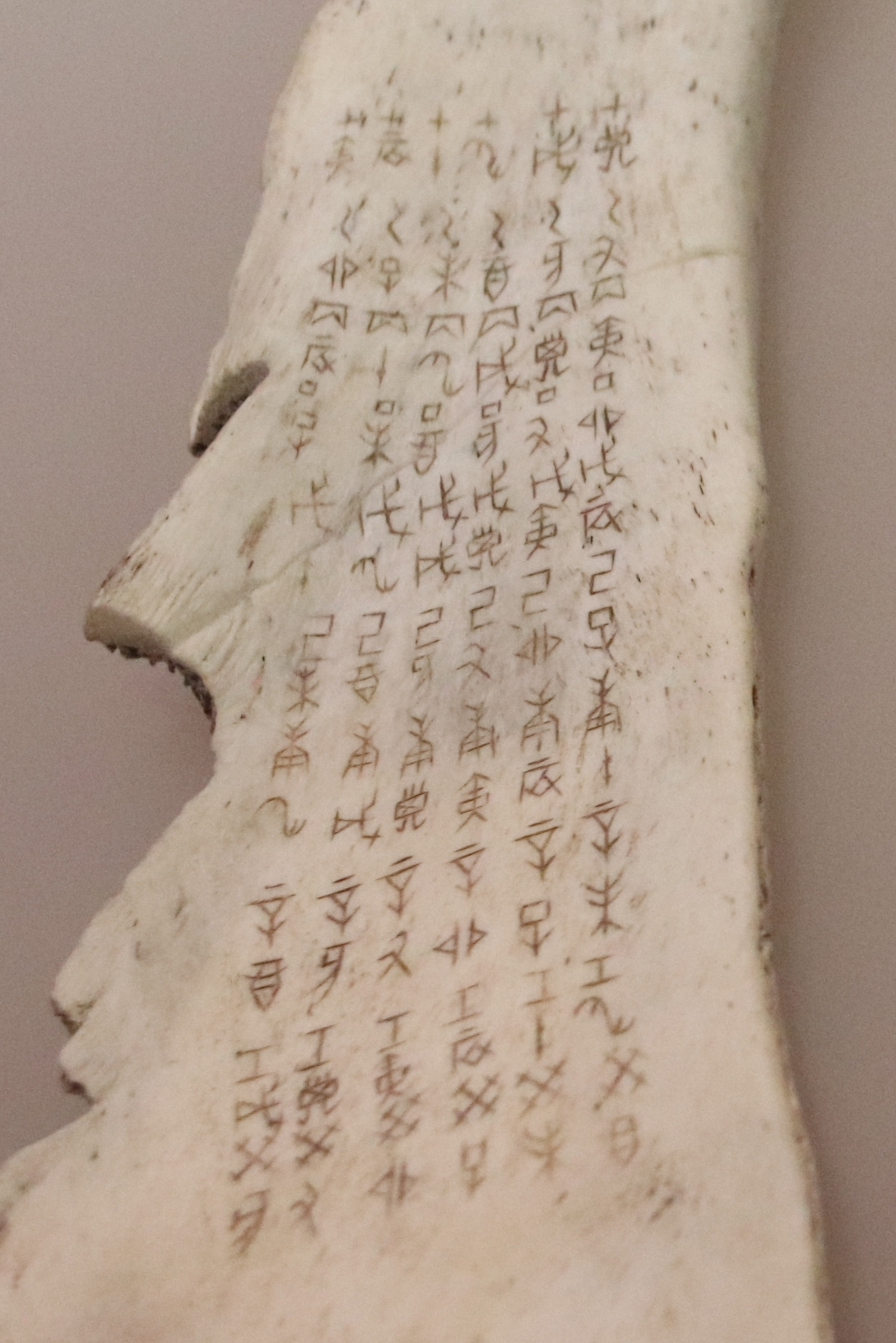
A table created by Shang scribes containing characters for the sexagenary Heavenly Stems.

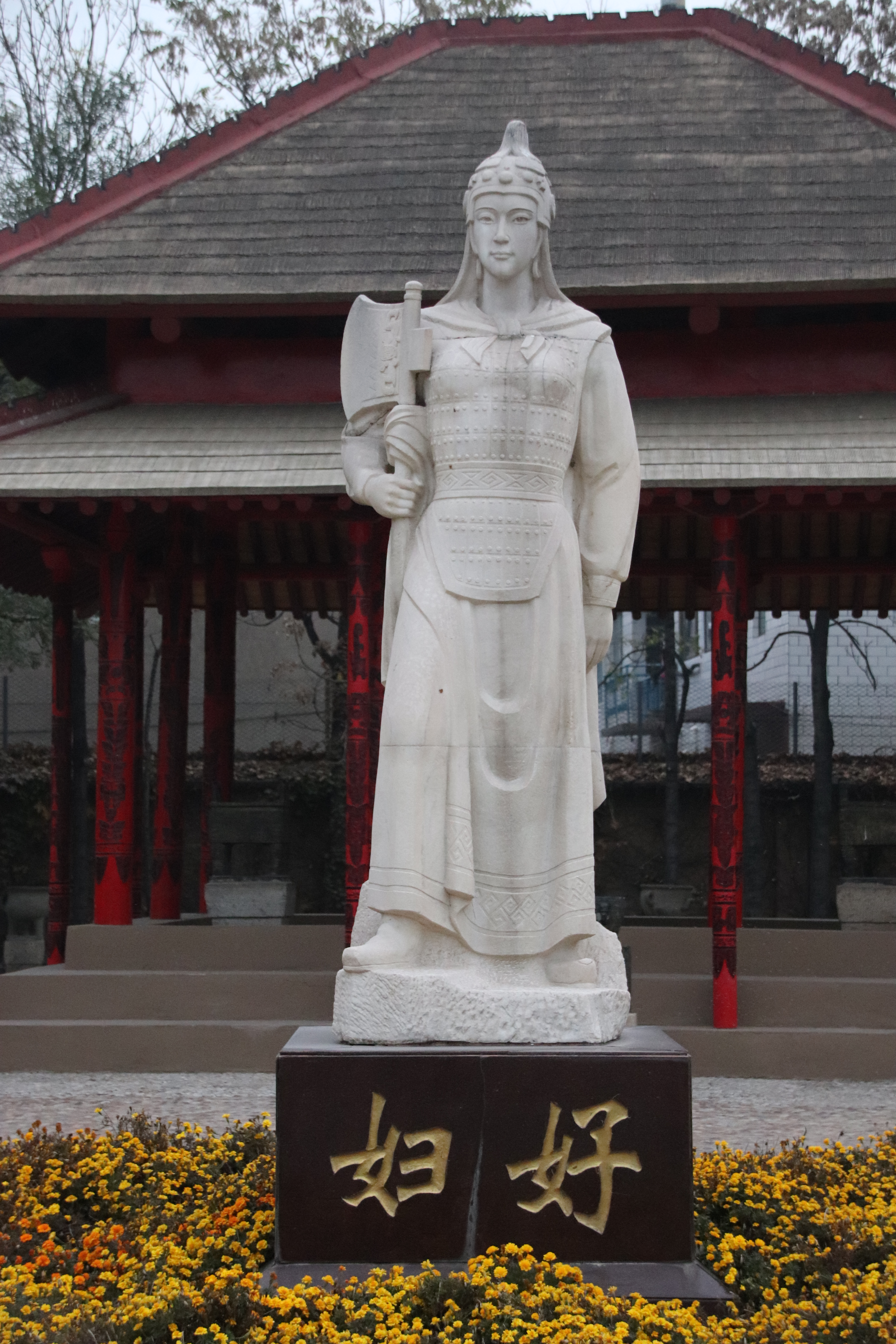
The statue of Fu Hao, a queen of the Shang dynasty who was highly revered and deified.

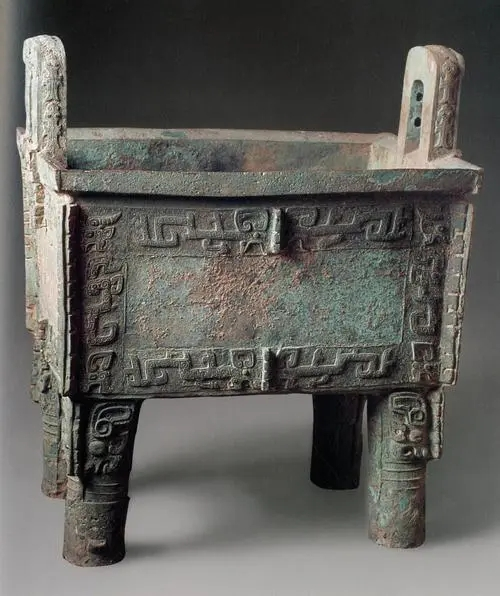
Houmuwu ding, whose production was commissioned by Zu Geng to honor his deceased mother Fu Jing.

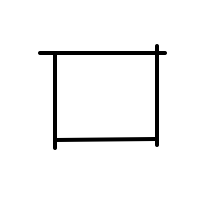
The Polar Square, which was thought to house Shang high royal ancestors as a part of the supreme being Shangdi.

== Bibliography ==
- Didier, John C. (2009). "In and Outside the Square: The Sky and the Power of Belief in Ancient China and the World, c. 4500 BC – AD 200". Sino-Platonic Papers (192). Victor H. Mair. Volume I: The Ancient Eurasian World and the Celestial Pivot, Volume II: Representations and Identities of High Powers in Neolithic and Bronze China, Volume III: Terrestrial and Celestial Transformations in Zhou and Early-Imperial China
- Eno, Robert (2010a). "History G380: Shang Religion" (PDF). Indiana University.
- Flad, Rowan; Lei, Xingshan; Liu, Yiting; Wang, Yang (2020). "Animal sacrifice in burial: Materials from China during the Shang and Western Zhou period". Archaeological Research in Asia (22).
- Keightley, David N. (1999). "The Shang: China's first historical dynasty". In Loewe, Michael; Shaughnessy, Edward L. (eds.). The Cambridge History of Ancient China. Cambridge University Press. pp. 232–291.
- Mizoguchi; Uchida (31 May 2018). "The Anyang Xibeigang Shang royal tombs revisited: a social archaeological approach". Antiquity. 92 (363): 709–723. doi:10.15184/aqy.2018.19. hdl:2324/2244064. S2CID 165873637.
- Nivison, David S. (January 1999), The key to the Chronology of the Three Dynasties: The "Modern Text" Bamboo Annals (PDF)
- Ruth H. Chang (2000). Understanding Di and Tian: Deity and Heaven From Shang to Tang Dynasties (PDF). Sino-Platonic Papers (Number 108).
- Smith, Adam (2010). The Chinese Sexagenary Cycle and the Ritual Foundations of the Calendar. doi:10.7916/D8891CDX.
