= Bao Bing of Shang =

Predynastic Shang ruler

Bao Bing 匚丙

Ruler of Predynastic Shang
- Predecessor: Bao Yi
- Successor: Bao Ding
Names
- Family name: Zi (子)
Temple name
- Bao Bing (匚丙)
- Father: Bao Yi

Bao Bing of Shang
- Chinese: 匚丙 or 報(报)丙
- Literal meaning: "Bao III"
Transcriptions
Standard Mandarin
- Hanyu Pinyin: bào bǐng
- Bopomofo: ㄅㄠˋ ㄅㄧㄥˇ
- Wade–Giles: pao^{4}-ping^{3}
Wu
- Romanization: ^{5}pau 5pin
Yue: Cantonese
- Yale Romanization: bou^{3} bing^{2}
Middle Chinese
- Middle Chinese: pawH pjaengX
Old Chinese
- Baxter–Sagart (2014): /*pˤuk-s praŋʔ/
- Zhengzhang: /*puːɡs pqraŋʔ/

Bao Bing (Chinese: 匚丙; pinyin: Bào bǐng) (Note: Also written as simplified Chinese: 报丙; traditional Chinese: 報丙) was the eleventh ruler of Predynastic Shang. Succeeding Bao Yi, he was the third of the Six Spirits (六示 (lìushì)) and venerated as an ancestral deity within the Religion of the Shang dynasty. After his death, he was succeeded by Bao Ding. He was only mentioned once in Records of the Grand Historian before oracular inscriptions revealed his historical deification, though comparatively little is known about his reign due to a lack of surviving records.

== Name ==
Bao Bing is written as 匚乙 in Oracle Bone Script, where 匚 is pronounced as bào rather than fāng. This is because it describes a bao-sacrifice (e.g. 匚于河 - To perform a bao sacrifice to the river deity He). The bing 丙 in Bao Bing's name may correspond to the day in which sacrifices are made to him, as all sacrifices made to him are made on bing days, matching scholarship on the topic.

In Records of the Grand Historian, Sima Qian writes Bao Bing as 報丙; because 匚 and 報 carry the same Shang ritual meaning, they can be considered direct synonyms.

The name "Bao Bing" is unlikely to be the name used in life; it was likely a temple name applied based on the day in which his reign began, and signifies the day in which sacrifices were to be made to him posthumously. Didier (2009) disputes that the bao in the names of Bao Yi, Bao Bing, and Bao Ding could have been kou 口 with its left stroke missing.

== In Oracle bone inscriptions ==
Bao Bing predates the Late Shang period; therefore, all mentions are in the context of posthumous ancestor veneration. As one of the Six Spirits, Bao Bing would have received sacrifices and veneration through scapulimancy rituals performed by Shang dynasty religious practitioners.

=== The "Three Baos" ===
In the Religion of the Shang dynasty, Bao Bing was the middle of the "Three Baos" 三匚, the others being Bao Yi and Bao Ding. They occasionally received sacrifices as a group entity, sometimes with the "Two Shis", Shi Ren and Shi Gui and/or Shang Jia:

三匚二示暨上甲𫹉王受祐 吉
If the King performs the ritual of pouring wine for the Three Baos, Two Shis, and Shang Jia, will we receive their protection? Result: Auspicious!

In Records of the Grand Historian, Sima Qian ordered the Three Baos incorrectly, in the order of; Bao Ding, Bao Yi, and, finally, Bao Bing. This error was noticed and corrected by Wang Guowei upon reviewing oracle bone evidence; while this did confirm that Sima Qian had access to Shang dynasty records that are unavailable today, and that the names were legitimate, it cast doubt on their validity. This was also one of the first cases of classical sources being reviewed alongside oracular inscriptions. The error in the ordering of the Baos is noticeable when comparing them to Heavenly Stems: In the correct order, it is the same as the standard ordering of the Stems: 报乙 (Bao 2)、报丙 (Bao 3)、报丁 (Bao 4).

=== Sacrifices ===
Unless sacrifices are made to the Three Baos as a group, every sacrifice made to Bao Bing was made on an bing day, corresponding to his temple name. For example:

丙戌卜行貞王賓匚丙彡無尤在十一月
On the bingxu day, Hang divinated. Test: If the King performs a bin ritual with Bao Bing and does a rong sacrifice, will there be no misfortune in the 11th month?

== Notes ==
Bao Bing of Shang Predynastic Shang
Regnal titles
Preceded by Bao Yi	King of Shang	Succeeded by Bao Ding
