= Bao Ding of Shang =

Predynastic Shang ruler

Bao Ding 匚丁

Ruler of Predynastic Shang
- Predecessor: Bao Bing
- Successor: Shi Ren
- Spouse: Bi Geng (妣庚)
Names
- Family name: Zi (子)
Temple name
- Bao Ding (匚丁)
- Father: Bao Bing

Bao Ding of Shang
- Chinese: 匚丁 or 報(报)丁
- Literal meaning: "Bao IV"
Transcriptions
Standard Mandarin
- Hanyu Pinyin: bào dīng
- Bopomofo: ㄉㄧㄥ
- Wade–Giles: ting^{1}
Wu
- Romanization: ^{5}pau 1tin
Yue: Cantonese
- Yale Romanization: bou^{3} ding^{1}
Middle Chinese
- Middle Chinese: pawH teng
Old Chinese
- Baxter–Sagart (2014): /*pˤuk-s tˤeŋ/
- Zhengzhang: /*puːɡs teːŋ/

Bao Ding (Chinese: 匚丁; pinyin: Bào Dīng) (Note: Also written as simplified Chinese: 报丁; traditional Chinese: 報丁) was the twelfth ruler of Predynastic Shang. Succeeding Bao Bing, he was the fourth of the Six Spirits (六示 (lìushì)) and deified in the Religion of the Shang dynasty. After his death, he was succeeded by Shi Ren. Until oracle bones were unearthed in the 20th century, little was known about his life and status outside of lineage in Records of the Grand Historian.

== Name ==
Bao Ding is written as 匚丁 in Oracle Bone Script, where 匚 is pronounced as bào rather than fāng. This is because it describes a bao-sacrifice (e.g. 匚于河 - To perform a bao sacrifice to the river deity He). The ding 丁 in Bao Ding's name was quite a common use of a Heavenly Stem, implying a sense of prestige seen in naming schemes such as with rulers like Wu Ding. Furthermore, as all sacrifices to Bao Ding were conducted on ding days, it may also have been used to dictate on which day rituals should be conducted towards him.

In Records of the Grand Historian, Sima Qian writes Bao Ding as 報丁; as 匚 and 報 carry the same meaning in Shang ritual contexts, they are essentially synonyms.

Didier (2009) disputes that the bao in the names of Bao Yi, Bao Bing, and Bao Ding could have been kou 口 with its left stroke missing.

== In Oracle bone inscriptions ==
Bao Ding predates the Late Shang period; therefore, all mentions of him are in the context of ancestor veneration rituals through scapulimancy performed by Shang dynasty religious practitioners. As one of the Six Spirits, Bao Ding would have received consultation requests and sacrifices on matters important to the ruler. Additionally, his wife, Bi Geng (妣庚), would also receive sacrifices on account of being Shi Ren's mother.

=== The "Three Baos" ===
In the Religion of the Shang dynasty, Bao Ding was the last of the "Three Baos" 三匚, the others being Bao Yi and Bao Bing. They occasionally received sacrifices as a group entity, sometimes with the "Two Shis", Shi Ren and Shi Gui and/or Shang Jia in tow:

三匚二示暨上甲𫹉王受祐 吉
If the King performs the ritual of pouring wine for the Three Baos, Two Shis, and Shang Jia, will we receive their protection? Result: Auspicious!

In Records of the Grand Historian, Sima Qian ordered the Three Baos incorrectly, in the order of; Bao Ding, Bao Yi, and, finally, Bao Bing. This error was noticed and corrected by Wang Guowei in 1917 upon reviewing oracle bone evidence. While this did confirm Sima Qian had the right names and thus records lost today, it cast doubt on their historical accuracy. This was one of the first cases of comparative analysis between oracular and classical evidence. When the rulers are ordered correctly, they match the standard Heavenly Stem order: 报乙 (Bao 2)、报丙 (Bao 3)、报丁 (Bao 4).

=== Sacrifices ===
Unless sacrifices are made to the Three Baos as a group, every sacrifice made to Bao Ding was made on an Ding day, corresponding to his temple name. For example:

丁卯卜貞王賓匚丁彡日無尤
On the Dingmao day, a divination occurred. Test: If the King performs a bin ritual with Bao Ding and does a rong sacrifice, will there be no misfortune?

On one occasion, a sui-sacrifice made to Yi Yin was conducted on the same day in which Bao Ding was to be venerated:

甲寅貞伊歲遘匚丁日
On the Jiayin day, it was charged: A sui-sacrifice for Yi will coincide with the Bao Ding's day.

== Notes ==
Bao Ding of Shang Predynastic Shang
Regnal titles
Preceded by Bao Bing	King of Shang	Succeeded by Shi Ren
