= Shi Ren of Shang =

Predynastic Shang ruler

Shi Ren 示壬

Ruler of Predynastic Shang
- Predecessor: Bao Ding
- Successor: Shi Gui
- Spouse: Bi Geng (妣庚)
Names
- Family name: Zi (子)
Temple name
- Shi Ren (示壬)
- Father: Bao Ding

Shi Ren of Shang
- Chinese: 示壬
- Literal meaning: "Spirit VIIII"
Transcriptions
Standard Mandarin
- Hanyu Pinyin: shì rén
- Bopomofo: ㄕˋ ㄖㄣˊ
- Wade–Giles: shih^{4} jen^{2}
Wu
- Romanization: zy^{6} zen^{6}
Yue: Cantonese
- Yale Romanization: si^{6} jam^{4}
Middle Chinese
- Middle Chinese: zyijH nyim
Old Chinese
- Baxter–Sagart (2014): /*s-ɡijʔ-s n[ə]m/
- Zhengzhang: /*ɢljils njɯm/

Shi Ren (Chinese: 示壬; pinyin: shì rén) (Note: Also known as Chinese: 主壬; pinyin: zhǔ rén) was the thirteenth ruler of Predynastic Shang. He succeeded Bao Ding and was regarded as one of the culture's Six Spirits (六示 lìushì). Little was known about him until oracle bones were noticed by academia in the late 19th century, where his veneration was recorded in inscriptions. However, as he was only invoked, almost nothing is known about his life or reign. He was succeeded by his son, Shi Gui.

== Name and family ==
Shi Ren is known as Zhu Ren in Records of the Grand Historian, where Sima Qian records his father as Bao Bing. This was proven incorrect by Wang Guowei in the early-20th century, on account of oracle bone evidence and comparison with Heavenly Stem ordering systems of the time. Therefore, coupled with oracle bone evidence, the consensus is that Bao Ding was likely his predecessor. However, arguments have been made that Sima Qian could be right, as the amount of sacrifices made seems to imply a ritual order of priority in the oracle bone Wang Guowei used, not a familial lineage.

The ren 壬 in Shi Ren's name may describe the day in which sacrifices were to be made to him, being the 9th of the Heavenly Stems.

== In Oracle bone inscriptions ==
Shi Ren is mentioned over 100 times in oracle bone inscriptions, around as many times as Wang Hai. However, because Shi Ren predates the Late Shang where extant oracle bones come from, no inscription took place during his reign and are thus only in the context of Shang ancestral deification. Said inscriptions were in the context of scapulimancy, heating the shells of turtles such as those of Mauremys sinensis, until cracks appear, wherein the king consults them and determines whether the omen is auspicious or not. Ergo, while the inscriptions tell a lot about Shang ritual practice, they say little about Shi Ren's life.

=== The "Two Shis" ===
Alongside Shi Gui, Shi Ren is one of the "Two Shis" (二示), occasionally invoked together during divination.

癸巳卜祝貞二示祟王遣並 二告
On the Guisi day, a liturgist divinated. Charge: Are the Two Shis ailing the ruler king? Should we perform an appeasement ritual [to fix the situation]?

=== Sacrifices ===
Like all ancestral deities, Shi Ren received sacrifices, gave consultations, and protected the Shang, among other duties. Additionally, his late spouse, Bi Geng (妣庚), would also receive sacrifices. (Note: 郭沫若主编《甲骨文合集》（938正）) Given the name, Shi Ren only received sacrifices on ren days, unless it was being conducted alongside Shi Gui.

侑于示壬二牛
Perform a you-sacrifice of two oxen to Shi Ren.

壬子貞王賓示壬翌日無尤
On the renzi day, charge: Should the king perform a bin ceremony for Shi Ren, and if so, on the coming day, will there be no misfortune?

== Notes ==
Shi Ren of Shang Predynastic Shang
Regnal titles
Preceded by Bao Ding	King of Shang	Succeeded by Shi Gui
