= Shi Gui of Shang =

Predynastic Shang ruler

Shi Gui 示癸

Ruler of Predynastic Shang
- Predecessor: Shi Ren
- Successor: Tai Yi
- Spouse: Bi Jia (妣甲)
Names
- Family name: Zi (子)
Temple name
- Shi Gui (示癸)
- Father: Shi Ren

Shi Gui of Shang
- Chinese: 示癸
- Literal meaning: "Spirit X"
Transcriptions
Standard Mandarin
- Hanyu Pinyin: shì guǐ
- Bopomofo: ㄕˋ ㄍㄨㄟˇ
- Wade–Giles: shih^{4} kuei^{3}
Wu
- Romanization: zy^{6} gue^{6}
Yue: Cantonese
- Yale Romanization: si^{6} gwai^{3}
Middle Chinese
- Middle Chinese: zyijH kjwijX
Old Chinese
- Baxter–Sagart (2014): /*s-ɡijʔ-s kʷijʔ/
- Zhengzhang: /*ɢljils kʷilʔ/

Shi Gui (Chinese: 示癸; pinyin: shì guǐ) (Note: Also known as Chinese: 主癸; pinyin: zhǔ guǐ) was the fourteenth ruler of Predynastic Shang. He succeeded Shi Ren and was regarded as one of the culture's Six Spirits (六示 (lìushì)). He was the father of Tang of Shang, known to the Shang as Tai Yi (太乙), who in traditional Chinese historiography would go on to found the Shang dynasty by overthrowing Jie of Xia.

Little is known about the life of Shi Gui, as his life predates the Late Shang that oracle bones are known for. Prior to their unearthing in the late-19th century, he was only mentioned in Records of the Grand Historian when tracking the lineage of the Shang dynasty, along with a brief reference by a speech by a minister of the State of Lu in Guoyu when discussing the virtue of Tang of Shang, referring to a legend in which he was born from a "Dark Bird" to found Predynastic Shang. However, as he was invoked many times as an ancestral deity, details such as his spouse can still be derived.

== Name ==
Shi Gui is known as Zhu Gui (主癸) in Records of the Grand Historian, where Sima Qian records his father as Shi Ren. Along with other scribal errors, this was proven incorrect by Wang Guowei in the early-20th century, on account of oracle bone evidence that was unearthed from Anyang, Henan.

The gui 癸 in Shi Gui's name is the 10th of the Heavenly Stems, which is theorised to dictate on which days sacrifices are made to him, on account of many sacrifices being made on gui days. Notably, no other Shang ruler uses the gui stem, which is theorized by Nivison (1999) to be because of Shi Gui being Tang of Shang's father.

== Family ==
Shi Gui descends from Xie, the founder of Predynastic Shang; he was one of Emperor Ku's children, a descendant of the Yellow Emperor. Shi Gui would go on to father Tang of Shang, also known as Tai Yi. His only known consort was Bi Jia (妣甲), who shares the name with Tang's consort. As these are posthumous titles that are closely associated with the days on which they died, whether they are the same person is unclear.

A the last ancestor when discussing lineages of those prior to Tang, Shi Gui would be used as a terminator in oracle bone inscriptions:

庚申卜𫹉自上甲一牛至示癸一牛自大乙九示一牢椸示一牛
On the gengshen day, scapulimancy took place. The you sacrifice was made, starting with a single ox to Shang Jia through to Shi Gui; then a penned animal going through Tai Yi through the Nine Spirits (Da Ding to Zu Jia), and for the Yi shrines, one ox.

== Posthumous accounts ==
=== In Oracle bone inscriptions ===
Shi Gui is invoked around 50 times in oracle bone inscriptions, half as many times as Shi Ren. None of these take place during his reign, as they predate the Late Shang in which these inscriptions were made. These inscriptions were made in the context of scapulimancy, which was performed by heating the shells of turtles such as Mauremys sinensis until they cracked, wherein the ruler at the time would consult them to determine their auspiciousness. Thus, these inscriptions rarely give any details of Shi Gui's life, but do give insight into his deification.

==== The "Two Shis" ====
Alongside Shi Ren, Shi Gui is one of the "Two Shis" (二示), sometimes invoked together during divination.

丙申卜侑三匚二示
On the bingshen day, scapulimancy was performed. Should we perform a you-sacrifice to the Three Baos (Bao Yi, Bao Bing, and Bao Ding and the Two Shis?

X惟𫹉于二示
[Charge:] Is it a you sacrifice that we should perform for the Two Shis?

==== Sacrifices ====
Like all ancestral deities, Shi Gui received sacrifices, gave consultations, and protected the Shang, among other duties. Given the name, Shi Gui only received sacrifices on gui days, unless it was being conducted alongside Shi Ren.

Example:

癸酉卜尹貞王賓示癸彡無尤在十一月
On the guiyuou day, Yi performed scapulimancy. The King charges: "If we perform the bin ritual for Shi Gui and then a rong sacrifice, will there be no misfortune on the eleventh month?

=== In Guoyu ===
In Guoyu (國語), a Zhou dynasty text attributed to Zuo Qiuming (左丘明), Shi Gui is mentioned by a minister of the State of Lu alongside other Predynastic Shang rulers in comparison to Tang of Shang, discussing the importance of ancestral order in the context of filial conduct.

夏父弗忌為宗，蒸將躋僖公。宗有司曰：「非昭穆也。」曰：「我為宗伯，明者為昭，其次為穆，何常之有！」有司曰：「夫宗廟之有昭穆也，以次世之長幼，而等胄之親疏也。夫祀，昭孝也。各致齊敬于其皇祖，昭孝之至也。故工、史書世，宗、祝書昭穆，猶恐其逾也。今將先明而後祖，自玄王以及主癸莫如湯，自稷以及王季莫如文、武，商、周之蒸也，未嘗躋湯與文、武，為不逾也。魯未若商、周而改其常，無乃不可乎？」弗聽，遂躋之。
Xiafu Fuji was serving as temple officer. At the winter sacrifice, he wanted to elevate Duke Xi. Another officer warned: "This is not in the proper arrangement of our other dukes (Zhaomu)." Fuji responded, "I am the temple officer. The illustrious ones are dubbed Zhao, the respected are called Mu. What is "fixed" about this order?" The contending officer said: "The Zhaomu order in the ancestral temple exists to rank generations by seniority and determine closeness by blood. Sacrifice manifests filial conduct. Each person offers reverence to their ancestors - that is the ultimate expression of this conduct. This is why the scribes and the workers record genealogies, and why temple officers and liturgists document the generational order. They fear of overstepping their boundaries. Now you wish to place an illustrious (Zhao) ruler before his ancestor. From the Dark King (Xie) down to Shi Gui, none surpassed Tang; from Hou Ji down to Wang Ji, none surpassed Kings Wen and Wu. Yet neither Shang nor Zhou, at their winter sacrifices, ever elevated Tang, Wen, or Wu above their predecessors, as they did not violate that order. Lu is not equal to Shang or Zhou, yet it hopes to change this established practice. This can't be right. Fuji would not listen, and elevated Duke Xi."

== Notes ==
Shi Gui of Shang Predynastic Shang
Regnal titles
Preceded by Shi Ren	King of Shang	Succeeded by Tai Yi
