= Shang Jia =

Shang Jia 上甲
- Shàngjiǎ 上甲 in Oracle bone script. (Note: This character is not encoded, but can and is rendered as 㘡)

Leader of the Predynastic Shang
- Successor: Bao Yi
- Predecessor: Wang Hai
Names
- Family name: Zi (子)
Temple name
- Shang Jia (上甲)

Shang Jia
- Chinese: 上甲(微)
- Literal meaning: "High I"
Transcriptions
Standard Mandarin
- Hanyu Pinyin: shàng jiǎ (wēi)
- Bopomofo: ㄕㄤˋ ㄐㄧㄚˇ (ㄨㄟˊ)
- Wade–Giles: shang^{2}-chia^{3}(-wei^{1})
Wu
- Romanization: zaon^{6} ciaq^{7} (vi^{6})
Yue: Cantonese
- Yale Romanization: soeng^{5} gaap^{3} (mei^{4})
Middle Chinese
- Middle Chinese: dzyangH kaep (mj+j)
Old Chinese
- Baxter–Sagart (2014): /*daŋʔ-s [k]ˤr[a]p (məj)/
- Zhengzhang: /*djaŋs kraːb (mɯl)/

Shang Jia (Chinese: 上甲), also known as Shang Jia Wei (Chinese: 上甲微), is one of the 14 predynastic Shang Kings cited in Records of the Grand Historian. He was worshipped by the Shang kings as a sun deity and one of the Six Spirits (六示 (lìushì)).

== Family ==
According to the Shang family tree, Shang Jia was a pre-dynastic ancestor of the Shang. He is listed in Records of the Grand Historian as one of the 14 Predynastic Shang kings, being the son of Wang Hai and the father of Bao Yi.

== Veneration by the Shang ==
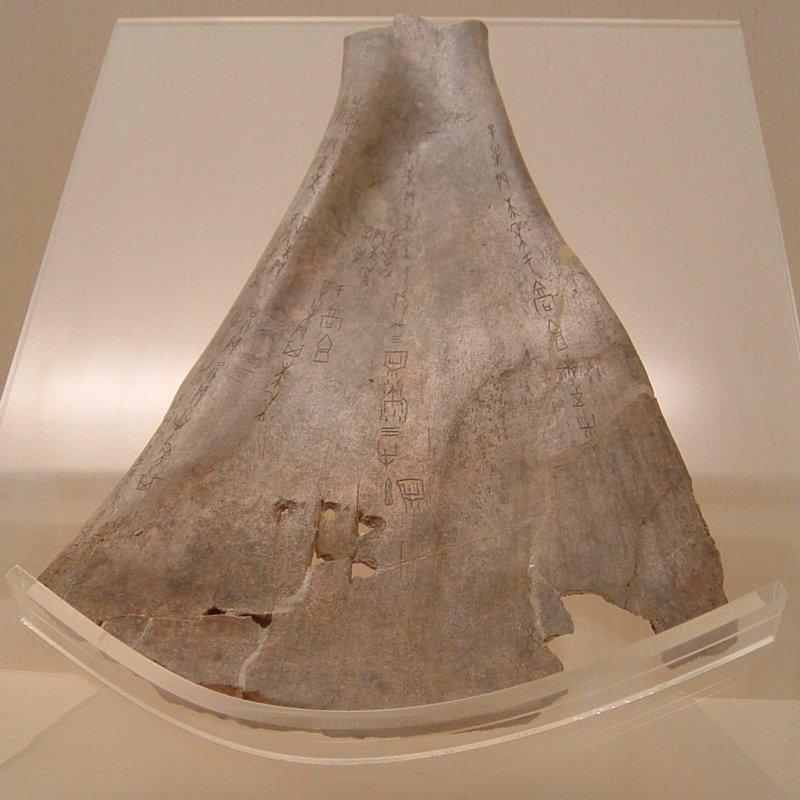
Oracle bone inscription of a sacrifice made to Shang Jia.

According to the sinologist Li Feng, Shang Jia was probably important for the Shang's rise to power, as he was the "first pre-dynastic ancestor to whom the late Shang kings made frequent sacrificial offerings". He was the first of the Shang descendants to be named after one of the 10 Heavenly Stems, symbolizing the day of the week he was worshipped. The cult of Shang Jia grew on the year si (ਘ), and all the kings claimed to be his direct ancestor. He was the spirit of the sun and deemed to be very powerful, as he was one of the oldest descendants of the kings. Sacrifices for him were made for wars and harvests.

The rituals involving Shang Jia are extensive, with over 800 mentions across oracle bones. One example details the Xingfang sending Qiang tribe members to be used as sacrifices for the Six Spirits, in which Shang Jia will always be mentioned first:

壬寅卜𬆩貞興方以羌用自上甲至下乙
On the renyin day, plastromancy was performed. Diviner Nan charges: If the Xingfang bring Qiang people for use, should we use them in sacrifices from Shang Jia down to Xia Yi?

Even you 侑 sacrifices, which involve beckoning an ancestor to eat with the Shang, Shang Jia would receive extensive sacrifices:

貞來甲寅侑于上甲十牛
Charge: On the coming jiayi day, should we perform a you sacrifice to Shang Jia of 10 oxen?

== Posthumous accounts ==
According to the Bamboo Annals, Shang Jia's father Wang Hai was killed by Mianchen of the Youyi Tribe in the 12th year of Xie of Shang's reign. Shang Jia would go on to avenge him four years later, leading an army with the support of the river deity Hebo. Later, during the reign of Wu Ding, it is said that Wu Ding paid respects to Shang Jia with a bao 報 sacrifice in the 12th year of his reign.

In Guoyu, Shang Jia is cited as having followed Xie's example during a speech by Zhan Qin (展禽), thus leading to his veneration.

== Legacy ==
=== In Confucianism ===
In the Kongcongzi, Duke Ding of Lu discusses the Book of Documents with Confucius. He brings up the Shang people venerating Shang Jia with bao 報 sacrifices, which Confucius describes as being given to those who are of the ancestral line but did not do enough to be considered a zu 祖 ancestor; this would preserve their innate power. The Duke asked if this would mean Duke Xi of Lu could or otherwise should be venerated in this way, but Confucius replies that while the Youyu-shi, Xia, and Shang did this, he did not know whether this would apply to Duke Xi. This narrative notably contradicts the extensive veneration Shang Jia documented as occurring during the Late Shang period.

== Notes ==
Shang Jia Predynastic Shang
Regnal titles
Preceded by Wang Gen	King of Shang	Succeeded by Bao Yi
