= Predynastic Shang =

21st-century BC precursor to the Shang dynasty

Predynastic Shang 先商
- c. 21st century BC–c. 1600 BC
- Location of the Xiaqiyuan culture, proposed by many archaeologists as the Proto-Shang
- Status: Autonomous state within Xia dynasty
- Common languages: Old Chinese
- Religion: Shang state religion
- Government: Chiefdom
- Leader
- History
  - Start of Xie's rule: c. 21st century BC
  - Battle of Mingtiao: c. 1600 BC
  - Established dynasty: c. 1600 BC
Succeeded by
Shang dynasty
- Today part of: China

Predynastic Shang or Proto-Shang (/ʃæŋ/; Chinese: 先商) was the tribal Shang dynasty chiefdom situated within the Xia dynasty prior the overthrow of their ruler, Jie of Xia, in traditional Chinese historiography. The Xia–Shang–Zhou Chronology Project identifies the end of Predynastic Shang as c. 1600 B.C., with the founding of the Erligang culture, which is traditionally considered to be the rough date of the Battle of Mingtiao.

== Traditional historiography ==
=== Founding myth ===
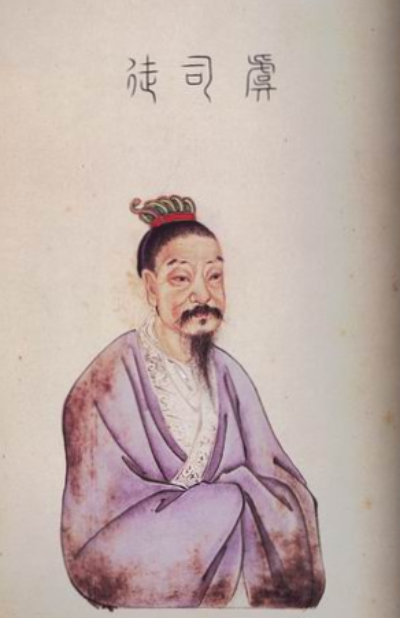
Xie, the legendary founder of Predynastic Shang.

Traditional Chinese historiography as it pertains to Predynastic Shang is typically derived from Sima Qian's Records of the Grand Historian, which claims that Predynastic Shang began with Xie of Shang, the son of Emperor Ku and a descendant of the Yellow Emperor. Xie is said to have been born from an egg laid by a "dark bird" (xuanniao 玄鳥) that was eaten by his mother, Jian Di (簡狄) of the Yousong clan (有娀氏). As he grew up, Xie is said to have helped Yu the Great control the flooding of the Yellow River that decimated cultures at the time. After succeeding in his work, Emperor Shun offered him a fief and the role of Minister of Instruction, which thereby founded Shang as a fang state. Over time, Shang flourished, going through several rulers, such as Wang Hai and Shi Ren, who would go on to be revered as High Ancestors (高祖). During this period, the capital changed eight times, eventually landing at Yin, which would be the post-Shang name for the tribe used by Sima Qian.

After the passing of Yu the Great, the rulers of Xia became progressively more belligerent, corrupt, and irresponsible. This came to a head when Jie of Xia ordered that a new palace be built, which took 7 years and left the people resentful of him. As Tang of Shang, then-ruler of Shang, treated his allies with respect and virtue, they banded together with him to rebel against Xia hegemony in the Battle of Mingtiao.

=== Relationship with the Xia dynasty ===
Records of the Grand Historian documents a heavy association with the Xia dynasty, a semi-legendary culture said to have been located around modern-day Henan and Shanxi. However, archaeological evidence for the Xia dynasty's existence is tenuous, given the lack of written records, and strong arguments have been made that it was an invention made by the Zhou dynasty used to post-hoc justify its takeover of the Late Shang.

If the assumption that the Xia dynasty existed is taken as fact, then the Shang concept of fang 方 nations could potentially be incompatible with the Xia's concept of the Nine Provinces. However, scholars such as Tong Zhuchen have argued that it could be that fang nations were tribes not within the Xia sphere of influence, but within the Nine Provinces regardless.

== List of rulers ==
#	English name	Chinese name
1	Xie	契
2	Zhao Ming	昭明
3	Xiang Tu	相土
4	Chang Ruo	昌若
5	Cao Yu	曹圉
6	Ming	冥
7	Wang Hai	王亥
8	Wang Gen	王亙
9	Shang Jia	上甲
10	Bao Yi	匚乙
11	Bao Bing	匚丙
12	Bao Ding	匚丁
13	Shi Ren	示壬
14	Shi Gui	示癸
15	Tang	太乙

== Legacy ==
Tang, the first ruler of the dynastic Shang.

=== During the Shang dynasty ===
==== Six Spirits ====
Six of the later Predynastic Shang rulers; Shang Jia, Bao Yi, Bao Bing, Bao Ding, Shi Ren, and Shi Gui, would go on to be venerated in the Religion of the Shang dynasty as ancestral deities during the Shang dynasty, with reverence being displayed into the Late Shang period. These individuals, dubbed the Six Spirits (六示), would receive wealthy sacrifices, be consulted for administrative guidance, receive requests for protection and good harvest, among numerous other requests.

Among the six, Shang Jia was the highest, commonly interpreted to be identical with Di and was seen as a sun deity. Meanwhile, the remaining five were commonly referred to as the "Lesser Spirits" and saw less extravagant rituals. The "Six Spirits" appear frequently on Shang oracle bones, sometimes being revered in groups, or otherwise individually.

=== Zhou dynasty mentions ===
Tang of Shang is mentioned prominently in Zhou dynasty materials, particularly Confucianist materials such as the Classic of Poetry, where he is mentioned in all Sacrificial Odes of Shang (商頌). Furthermore, speeches made by Yi Yin and Tang are recorded in the Book of Documents, Xunzi, and the Bamboo Annals, where he is typically described as a sage-king.

Tang is mentioned as an example by Zi Xia in the Analects as an example of ren.

樊遲問仁。子曰：「愛人。」問知。子曰：「知人。」樊遲未達。子曰：「舉直錯諸枉，能使枉者直。」樊遲退，見子夏。曰：「鄉也吾見於夫子而問知，子曰，『舉直錯諸枉，能使枉者直』，何謂也？」子夏曰：「富哉言乎！舜有天下，選於眾，舉皋陶，不仁者遠矣。湯有天下，選於眾，舉伊尹，不仁者遠矣。」
Fan Chi asked about benevolence. The Master said, "It is to love all men." He asked about knowledge. The Master said, "It is to know all men." Fan Chi did not immediately understand these answers. The Master said, "Employ the upright and put aside all the crooked; in this way the crooked can be made to be upright." Fan Chi retired, and, seeing Zi Xia, he said to him, "A Little while ago, I had an interview with our Master, and asked him about knowledge. He said, 'Employ the upright, and put aside all the crooked; in this way, the crooked will be made to be upright.' What did he mean?" Zi Xia said, "Truly rich is his saying! Shun, being in possession of the kingdom, selected from among all the people, and employed Gao Yao, on which all who were devoid of virtue disappeared. Tang, being in possession of the kingdom, selected from among all the people, and employed Yi Yin, and all who were devoid of virtue disappeared." – James Legge translation, 1888

== Archaeology ==
No written records from Predynastic Shang have been uncovered; the earliest date back to the Late Shang period of Wu Ding. Archaeologists in China have sought to divide the earlier part of the Shang dynasty, and the preceding Xia dynasty, between the dominant bronze-using civilizations of the period, the Erligang culture (c. 1600–1400 BC) and the aforementioned Erlitou culture (c. 1880–1520 BC). The current dominant view, adopted by the Xia–Shang–Zhou Chronology Project, is to identify the later part of Xia with Erlitou and the early Shang with Erligang.

The Xiaqiyuan culture, recognised by their distinct style of pottery, was a contemporary of the Erlitou, occupying the eastern foothills of the Taihang Mountains to its north. Many archaeologists identify this culture, or one of its variants, as the Proto-Shang, primarily on the basis of geographical proximity and similar pottery types to those of Erligang.

== See also ==
- Shang archaeology
- Periodization of the Shang dynasty
- Late Shang
- Predynastic Zhou
- List of Chinese monarchs
