= Wang Guowei =

Chinese historian and poet

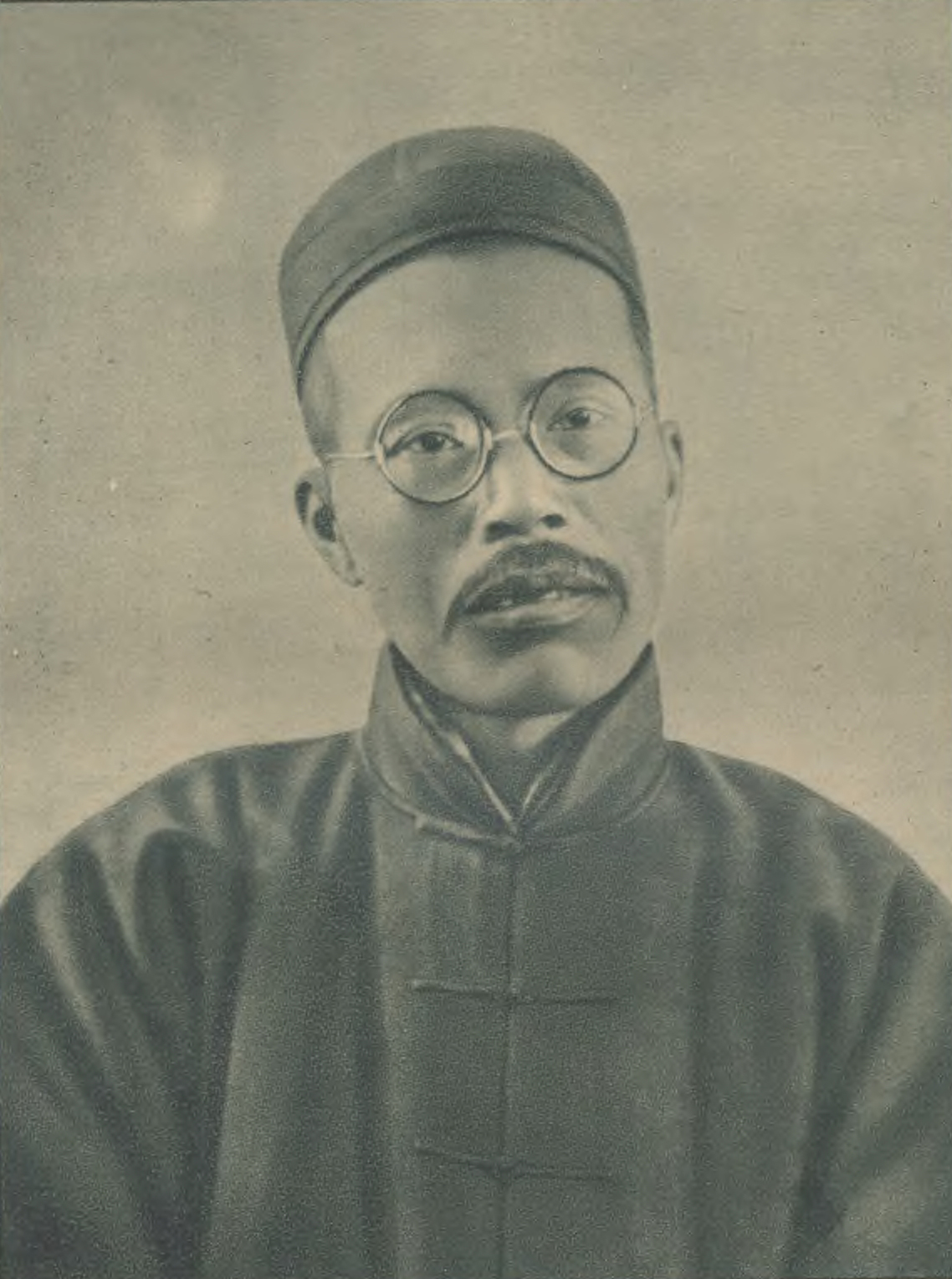
- Born: 2 December 1877; Haining, Zhejiang, Qing China
- Died: 2 June 1927 (aged 49); Kunming Lake, Beijing, Republic of China
- Cause of death: Suicide by drowning
- Occupations: Historian, poet

Chinese name
- Traditional Chinese: 王國維
- Simplified Chinese: 王国维
Transcriptions
Standard Mandarin
- Hanyu Pinyin: Wáng Guówéi
- Gwoyeu Romatzyh: Wang Gwowei
- Wade–Giles: Wang^{2} Kuo^{2}-wei^{2}
- IPA: [wǎŋ kwǒwěɪ]
Wu
- Romanization: Waõn Kueʔ-vi

Wang Guowei (Chinese: 王國維; 2 December 1877 – 2 June 1927) or Wang Kuo-wei, courtesy name Jing'an (靜安) or Boyu (伯隅), was a Chinese historian and poet. A versatile scholar, he made important contributions to the studies of ancient history, epigraphy, philology, vernacular literature and literary theory.

== Biography ==
A native of Haining, Zhejiang, he went to Shanghai to work as a proofreader for a newspaper, after failing to pass the Imperial Examination in his hometown, at the age of 22. There he studied in the Dongwen Xueshe (東文學社), a Japanese language teaching school, and became a protégé of Luo Zhenyu. Sponsored by Luo, he left for Japan in 1901, studying natural sciences in Tokyo. Back in China one year later, he began to teach in different colleges, and devoted himself to the study of German idealism. He fled to Japan with Luo when the Xinhai Revolution took place in 1911. He returned to China in 1916, but remained loyal to the overthrown Manchu emperor. In 1924, he was appointed professor by the Tsinghua University, where he was known as one of the "Four Great Tutors," along with the prominent Chinese scholars Liang Qichao, Chen Yinke, and Y. R. Chao.

Utilitarianism and 'Life-ism' (the continuous expansion and preservation of life) were advocated by Liang Qichao and Yan Fu, but drew criticism from Wang who claimed that they limited philosophical thinking.

In 1927, Wang drowned himself in Kunming Lake in the Summer Palace before the National Revolutionary Army entered Beijing during the Northern Expedition.

Chen Yinque's epitaph read: "The suicide of Wang was because he worried about losing the independent spirit and free thought he long cherished in his academic pursuit."

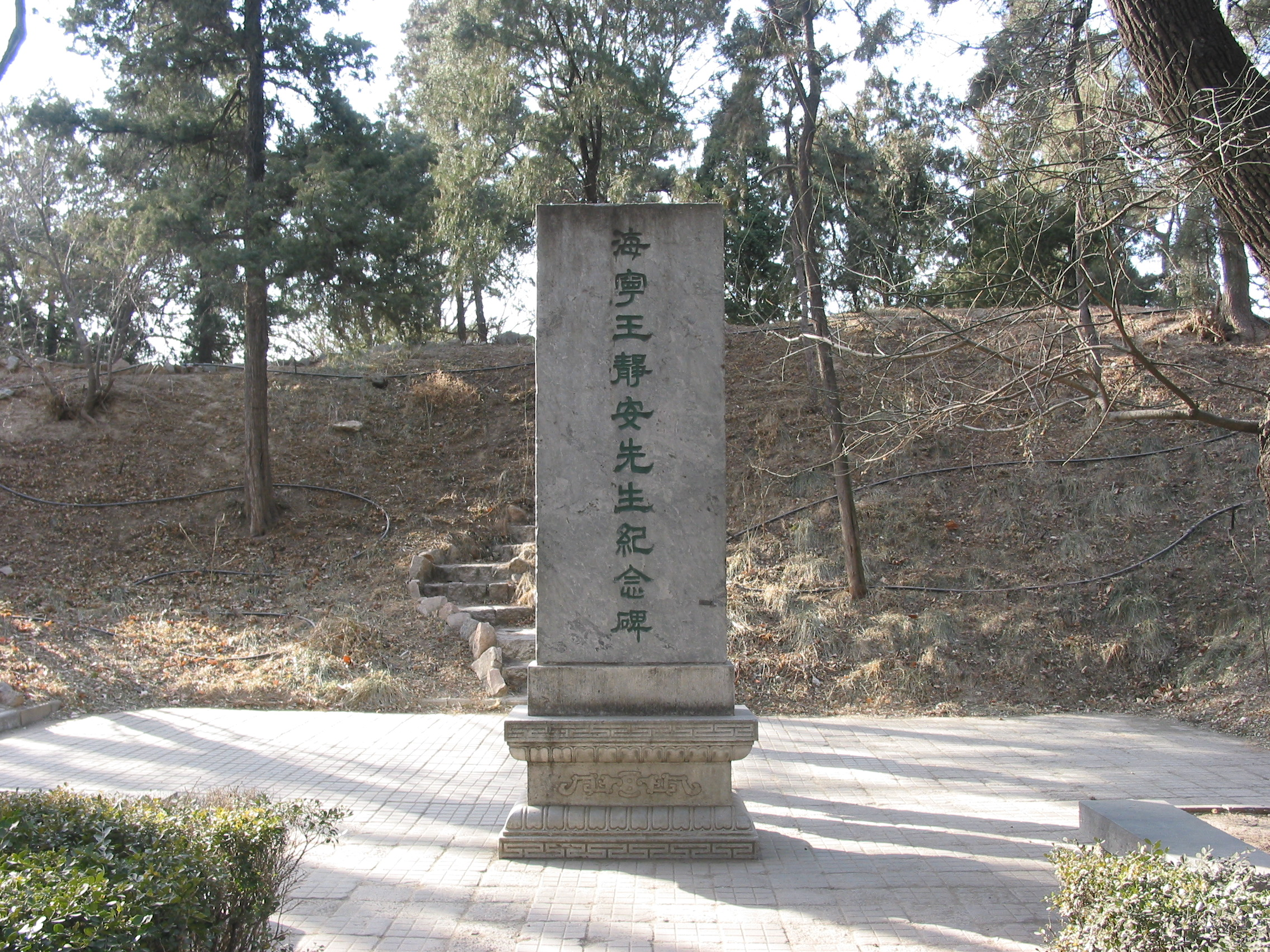
The monument of Wang Guowei at Tsinghua University

== Legacy ==
Wang focused on the studies of Chinese vernacular literature during the early year of his career. When he became convinced that Schopenhauer's metaphysics were not believable, he turned for solace to critical and philological studies of the novel Dream of the Red Chamber, as well as writing a concise history of the theaters of the Song and Yuan dynasties. Although its conclusions are controversial, his article "On A Dream of the Red Chamber" has been called "a monumental development in the history of modern Chinese criticism." Later he changed his academic direction, focusing on philology and ancient history. His works on ancient history and philology are collected in Guantang Jilin (觀堂集林). In these areas, Wang is remembered for his contributions to the study of oracle bone script and the history of the Shang dynasty. In 1917, Wang published a scholarly article entitled Study of the Ancestral Kings and Nobility Appearing in the Yin Oracular Inscriptions (殷卜辭中所見先公先王考) in which Wang identified 31 kings and ancestors of the Shang royal lineage as the recipients of sacrifices that were recorded in the Yinxu oracle bone inscriptions. Wang was able to basically confirm the king list compiled by Sima Qian over a millennium later in the "Basic Annals of Yin" of the Records of the Grand Historian (史記·殷本紀) while making several corrections to it.

In 1925, Wang proposed the "method of twofold evidence", arguing that archaeological evidence and historical records should not merely complement each other, but must mutually corroborate one another.
