= Youyu clan =

Chinese clan, c. 2500–2070 BCE

Youyu 有虞
- pre-c. 2,500 BCE–pre-c. 2,070 BCE
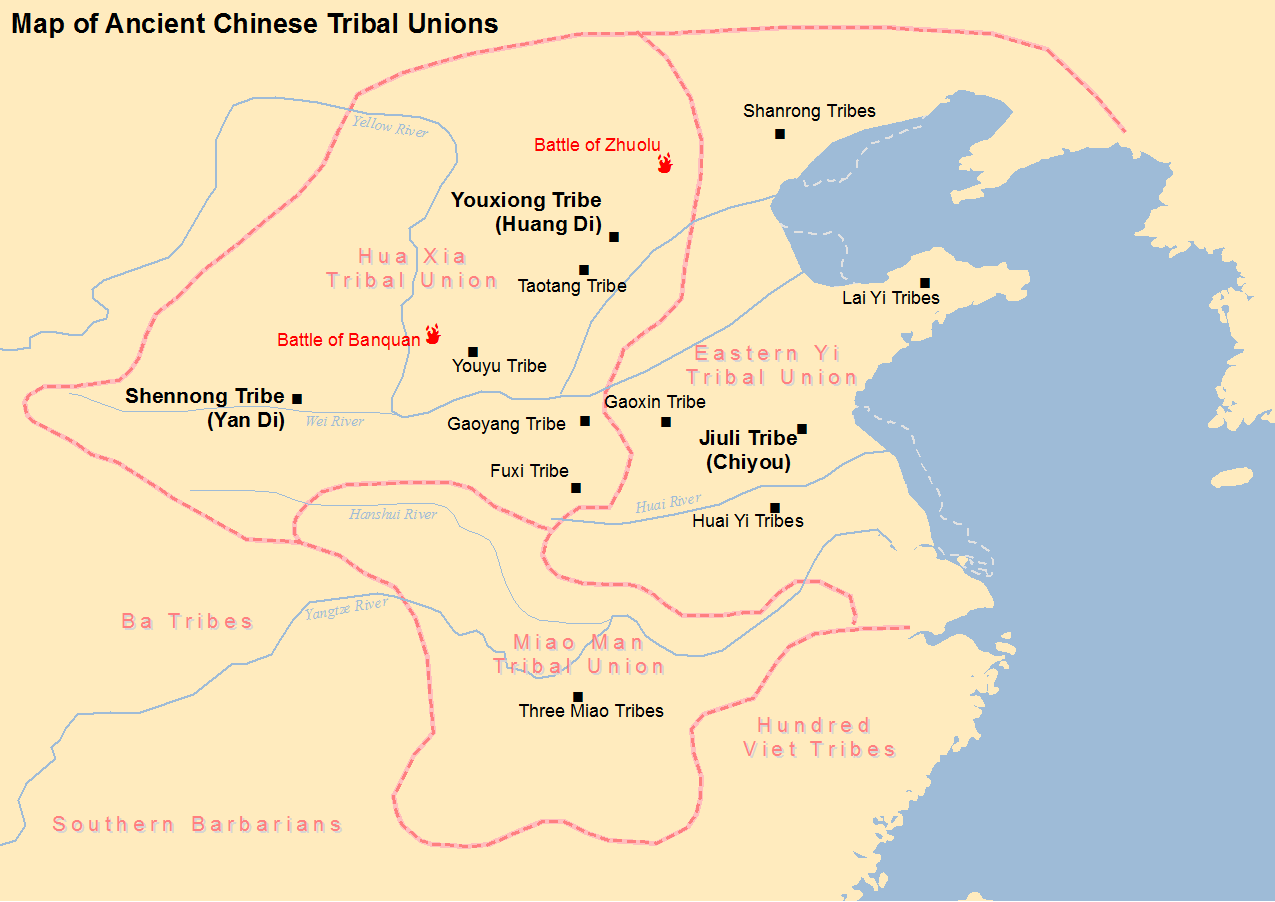
- Map of ancient tribal confederations during the Three Sovereigns and Five Emperors period.
- Common languages: Proto-Sinitic
- Government: Chiefdom
- Ruler
  - ?: Changyi
  - c. 2,500 BCE: Zhuanxu
  - ?: Qiongchan (窮蟬)
  - ?: Jingkang (敬康)
  - ?: Gouwang (句望)
  - ?: Qiaoniu (橋牛)
  - ?: Gusou (瞽叟)
  - c. 2120 BCE: Emperor Shun
- Historical era: Three Sovereigns and Five Emperors
  - Established: pre-c. 2,500 BCE
  - Birth of Changyi: ?
  - Enthronement of Zhuanxu: c. 2,500 BCE
  - Emperor Yao consults the Four Mountains: c. 2258 BCE
  - Enthronement of Emperor Shun: c. 2,255 BCE - 2,120 BCE
  - Subjugation of the Sanmiao tribe: c. 2,247 BCE - 2,112 BCE
  - Abdication of Shun: c. 2,205 - 2,070 BCE
  - Disestablished: pre-c. 2,070 BCE
- Today part of: Taosi, Shanxi

The Youyu clan (Chinese: 有虞氏) was ruled by Emperor Shun during the Three Sovereigns and Five Emperors period of China. Emperor Shun would take power after Emperor Yao of the Taotang clan abdicated, believing that his virtue surpassed that of his own successors. The territory controlled by the Youyu clan is hypothesized to have been located southwest of Pinglu County, in Shanxi Province, China. The clan faded from relevance after Emperor Shun, following Yao's example, abdicated in favor of Yu the Great, starting the Xia dynasty.

The clan is sometimes interpreted as an imperial dynasty predating the Xia dynasty; in this sense, it is called the Yu dynasty (虞朝). Combined with the Xia, it is sometimes referred to as the "Yu-Xia" (虞夏) period.

== In traditional historiography ==
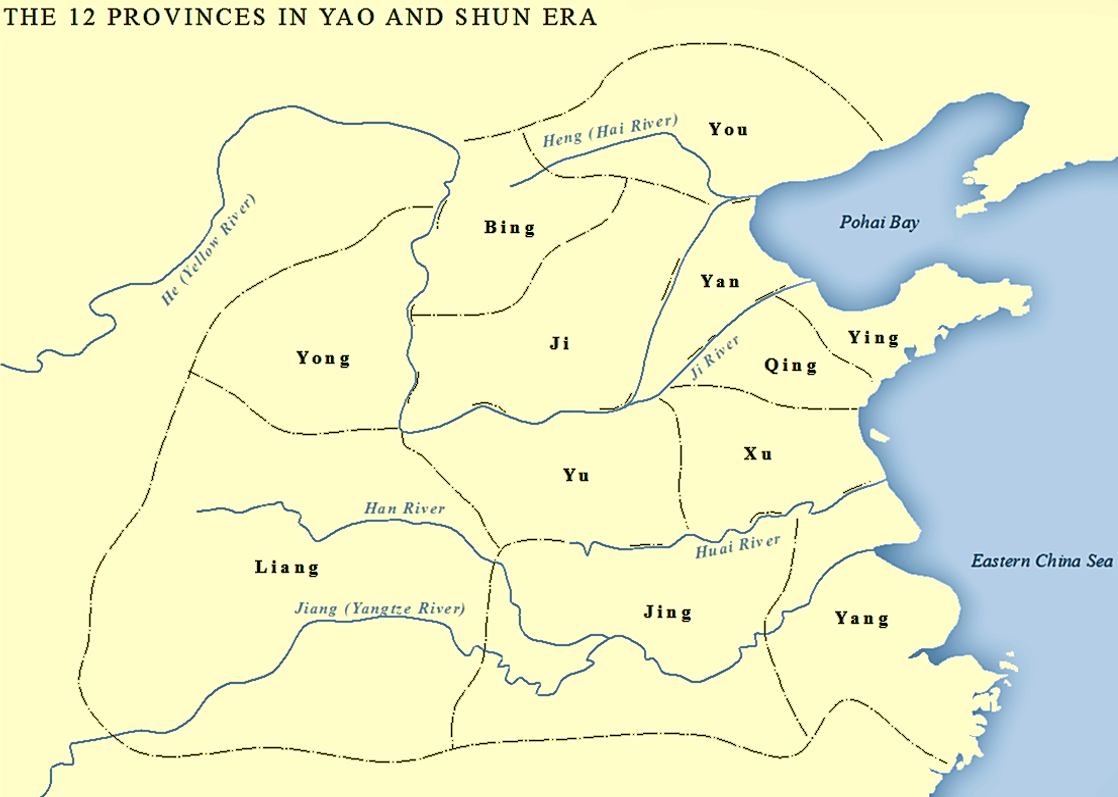
The Twelve Provinces defined during the Yao-Shun era of Chinese history.

Little is known about the leaders of the Youyu clan prior to Emperor Shun. Sima Qian (Note: In Records of the Grand Historian proper, Sima Qian notes that his own account likely has deficiencies, despite travelling extensively for accounts.) says the lineage began with Changyi, the second son of the Yellow Emperor. Changyi would bear Zhuanxu, who ruled as one of the earliest hegemons of predynastic China, according to the Bamboo Annals. Zhuanxu would reside in Pu (濮), compiling astronomical records in his 13th year and composing Chengyun (承雲) in his 21st. He would die in his 28th year, after which there was a rebellion started by Shu Qi (術器), which the Marquess of Xin (辛侯) would quash. Zhuanxu's son, Qiongchan, would bear Jingkang, and then from him to Gusou, little is known outside of names. By the days of Gusou, the clan was largely insignificant. Gusou, a cruel individual, would continually attempt to kill his son, Chonghua (重華), who would later be known as Emperor Shun. Despite these often elaborate attempts to kill him, Shun would nevertheless serve his parents and family with loyalty, leading to him being seen as a symbol of filial piety in later accounts.

During the twilight years of Emperor Yao, in his 70th year, he failed to raise a suitable successor that would be worthy of his own rule. He therefore consulted the Four Mountains and wished for his chancellor of such to succeed him instead. The chancellor denied, believing his moral faculty to be insufficient. Instead, he and the Four Mountains nominated Shun for the position. Some individuals, such as Gun, protested, but were swiftly put down. After serving for twenty years, overcoming the test of being given consorts, Shun would become the new Emperor of China.

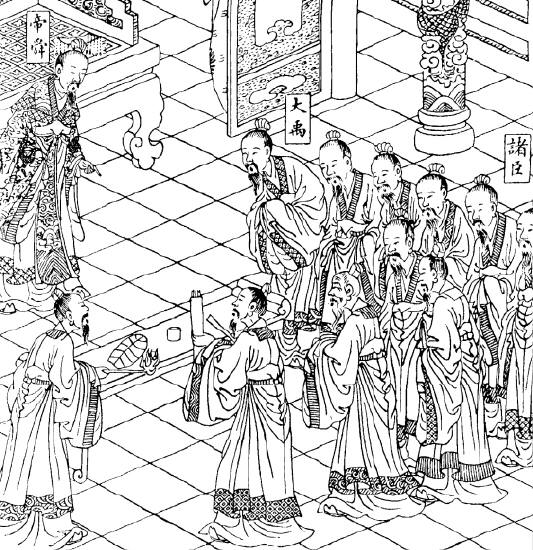
Qing dynasty illustration of Emperor Shun performing divination in a palace.

After Shun was enthroned, he composed Dashao music (大韶之樂). The first thirty years of his reign marked the formation of laws with help from Gao Yao, increased relations with the Youxia clan (有夏氏), improved enrolment in schools, and the enfeoffment of Yi Jun (義鈞) in what would become Predynastic Shang. Thereafter, Shun would order Yu the Great to subjugate the Youmiao clan (有苗氏), defeating Huandou in Shun's 35th year (c. 2,247 BCE). He would then confine Huandou on Mount Chong (宗山), banish Gonggong to You Prefecture, and imprison Gun on Feather Mountain. These four events would be known as the Four Criminals. In his final years, Shun would go to Mingtiao (鳴條) to spend his final days.

== Dynasty debate ==
Early historical texts refer to Yu (虞) as a long-lasting political entity, often alongside the later Xia, Shang, and Zhou dynasties. This has led to interpretations of them being considered a dynasty, not a predynastic polity, chiefly derived from the Book of Documents including a Book of Yu (虞典).

=== Evidence in favor ===
A Yu dynasty was mentioned alongside the Xia, Shang and Zhou dynasties in numerous historical Chinese works, including the Zuo Zhuan, Discourses of the States, Mozi, The Methods of the Sima, Master Lü's Spring and Autumn Annals and the Book of Rites. Texts from the Tsinghua Bamboo Slips cache have also reinforced this tie, with the excavated text The Government of Yu, Xia, Shang, and Zhou (虞夏殷周之治) being particularly notable for treating it on equal footing. This text notes that headware during this era was known as shou (首), and prioritised plainness over extravagance.

Historians such as Tang Shanchun note that the Youyu clan appeared to have a concrete political system: It organised a significant war against the Sanmiao tribe, had the punishment of exile with respect to Gun, and a hierarchy with the consultation of the Four Mountains. There is also a music culture when considering shao music. One proponent of the theory, Han Jianye, places the Taotang clan within the Yu dynasty as a period within the broader dynasty.

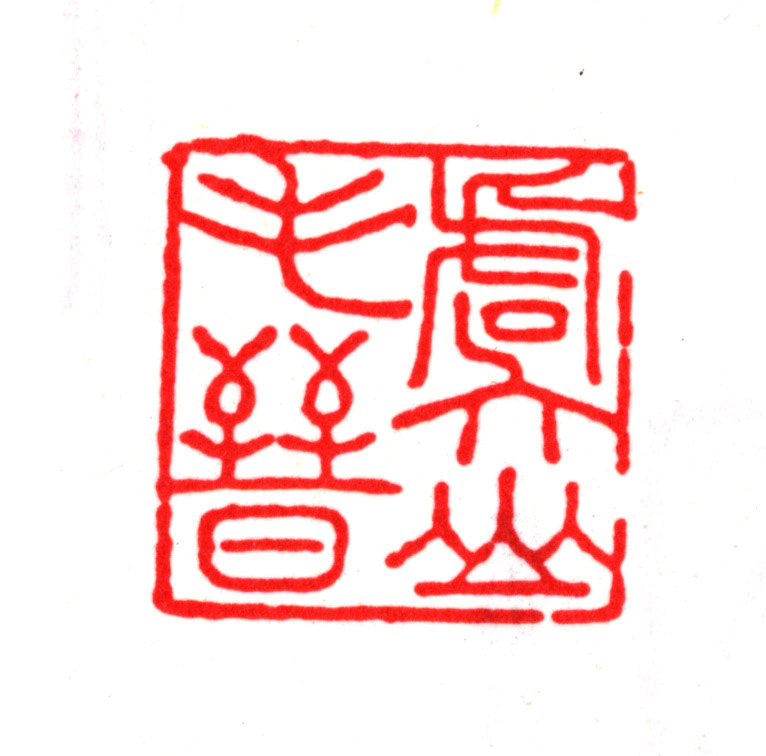
An imperial seal, featuring yu 虞 in the top-right with the tiger component. The seal refers to the mountain Yushan, Taiwan.

In 2002, Chinese historian Wang Shumin published an academic paper titled "There was a Yu dynasty before Xia, Shang and Zhou" which renewed public interest in the possible existence of a pre-Xia dynastic state in the Yellow River basin. Based on the available texts, Wang argues that the Yu dynasty lasted much longer than the reign of the Emperor Shun, and could be comparable in length to the Xia, Shang and Zhou dynasties that succeeded it, noting several rulers. Since then, this model has been used in academia; for example, Ye Shuxian links the character Yu (虞) with ancient Chinese tiger culture, believing the character carries the weight of tiger totemism given its use of the hu (虎) "tiger" component. The character is attested in oracle bone script on bones 華東 Huadong 3, 255, and 300.

Numerous large-scale urban ruins have been uncovered at the Taosi archaeological site, which is considered to be part of the Neolithic Longshan culture, which is traditionally thought to be the site of the Youyu clan. In particular, palaces and royal tombs were also discovered at Taosi, including a pot thought to have a wen (文, known as the Zhushu Wenzi 朱書文字) written in cinnabar, further proving the possible existence of a dynastic regime based on tribal confederation.

=== Evidence against ===
The existence of a Yu dynasty has been debated by historians and scholars. The lack of concrete, testable evidence to establish connection between it and any archaeological cultures means that this pre-Xia regime remains a legend. There is no documented, extant writing system for the Han script prior to the Late Shang period's oracle bone script, which means that even the Xia dynasty is incapable identifying itself, let alone a Yu dynasty, which makes testing this theory extremely difficult. Ergo, the Yu dynasty theory has yet to gain widespread acceptance as an archaeologically attested part of Chinese history, both within China and among Western scholars.

== Lineage ==
From the Records of the Grand Historian by Han official Sima Qian:

- Changyi (昌意) – Zhuanxu (顓頊) – Qiongchan (窮蟬) – Jingkang (敬康) – Gouwang (句望) – Qiaoniu (橋牛) – Gusou (瞽叟) – Chonghua, the Emperor Shun (帝舜 重華)

== Successor states ==
=== Enfeoffment in Chen ===
Map of the states of the Spring and Autumn Period, featuring the state of Chen.

After defeating Di Xin at the Battle of Muye, Gui Man (妫满), a descendant of the Youyu clan, was enfeoffed in Chen by the new King Wu of Zhou. King Wu would marry his eldest daughter, Da Ji (大姬), to him. Chen's capital was located in Wanqiu (宛丘), modern-day Huaiyang County.

=== Claim in Vietnam ===
The Hồ dynasty of Vietnam claimed descent from the Emperor Shun, through Duke Hu of Chen. The official name adopted by the Hồ state was Đại Ngu (大虞; lit. "Great Ngu"); "Ngu" is the Vietnamese rendition of the Chinese character yú (虞).

== See also ==
- History of China
- Dynasties of China
- Timeline of Chinese history
- Chinese historiography
- Three Sovereigns and Five Emperors
- Taowu
