= Youyu =

Youyu may refer to:

- Emperor Shun, legendary Chinese monarch from the Youyu Clan
- Youyu-shi or Youyu Clan, proposed Chinese dynasty ending with Emperor Shun
- Youyu County, in Shuozhou, Shanxi, China
- Youyu, grand chancellor of Qin State under the ruling of Duke Mu of Qin
