= Taotang clan =

Chinese clan, c. 2500 BCE

Taotang 陶唐
- c. 2336 BCE–c. 2,409 BCE
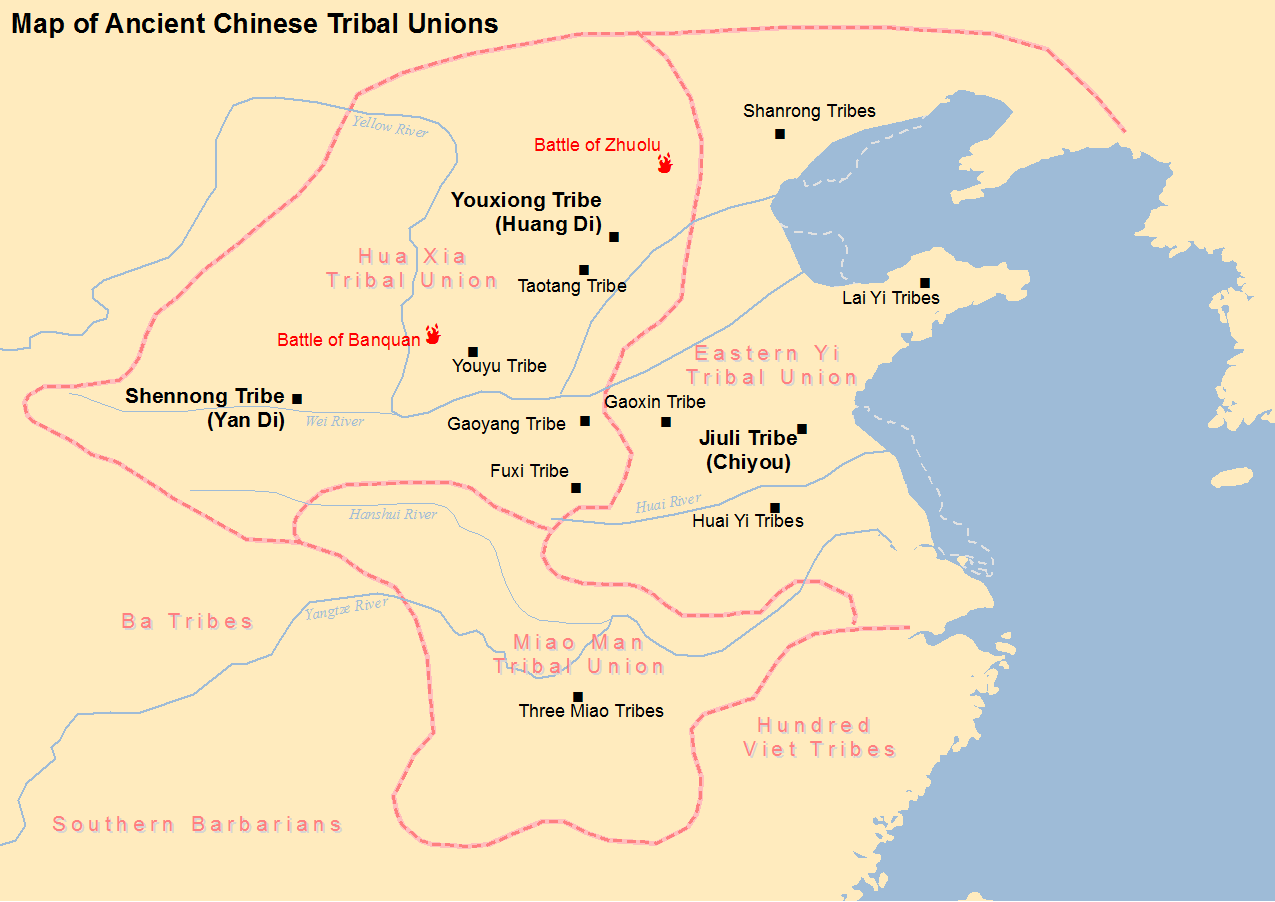
- Map of ancient tribal confederations during the Three Sovereigns and Five Emperors period.
- Common languages: Proto-Sinitic
- Government: Tribal confederation
- Ruler
  - c. 2,336 BCE - c. 2,409 BCE: Emperor Yao
- Historical era: Three Sovereigns and Five Emperors
  - Established: c. 2336 BCE
  - Enthronement of Emperor Yao: c. 2,336 BCE
  - Emperor Yao consults the Four Mountains: c. 2,412 BCE
  - Abdication to Emperor Shun: c. 2,409 BCE or 2,120 BCE
  - Disestablished: c. 2,409 BCE
Preceded by	Succeeded by
Shennong clan	Youyu clan
- Today part of: Taosi, Shanxi

The Taotang clan (陶唐氏) was a tribal confederation said to have existed during the Three Sovereigns and Five Emperors period of ancient China. It is known for its ruler, Emperor Yao, who is venerated as a virtuous sage-king.

== Name and identification ==
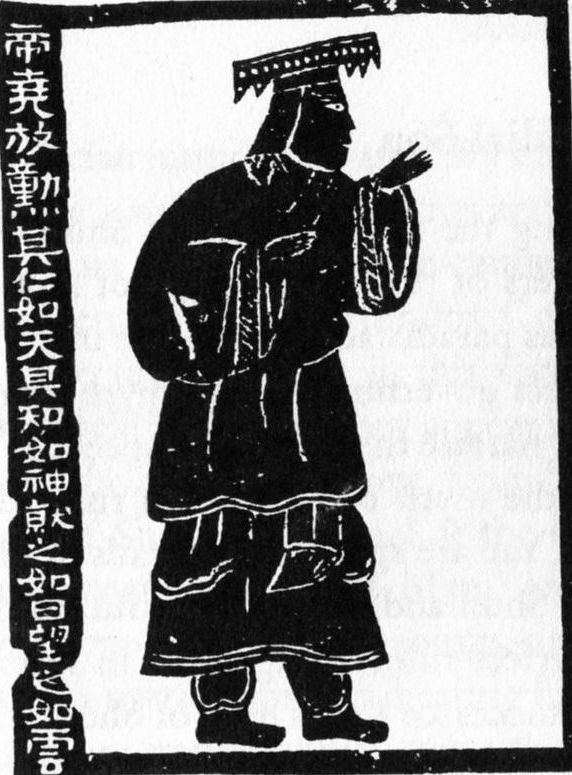
Interpretation of Emperor Yao depicted in the Wu Family Shrines, Eastern Han.

The name "Taotang" refers to the unification of the Tao (陶) and Tang (唐) clans, the latter of which seems to have been conquered by Emperor Yao early on.

Oracle bones note the existence of the state of Tang that existed into the Western Zhou period and beyond. Zhou Qinhan believes that the original Taotang state was ruled by an Earl of Yang (昜伯), possibly synonymous with Emperor Yao, who is mentioned in oracle bones and bronze inscriptions. Therefore, the Tang in the Taotang clan is sometimes thought to be a Taoyang clan (陶昜氏).

== Traditional historiography ==
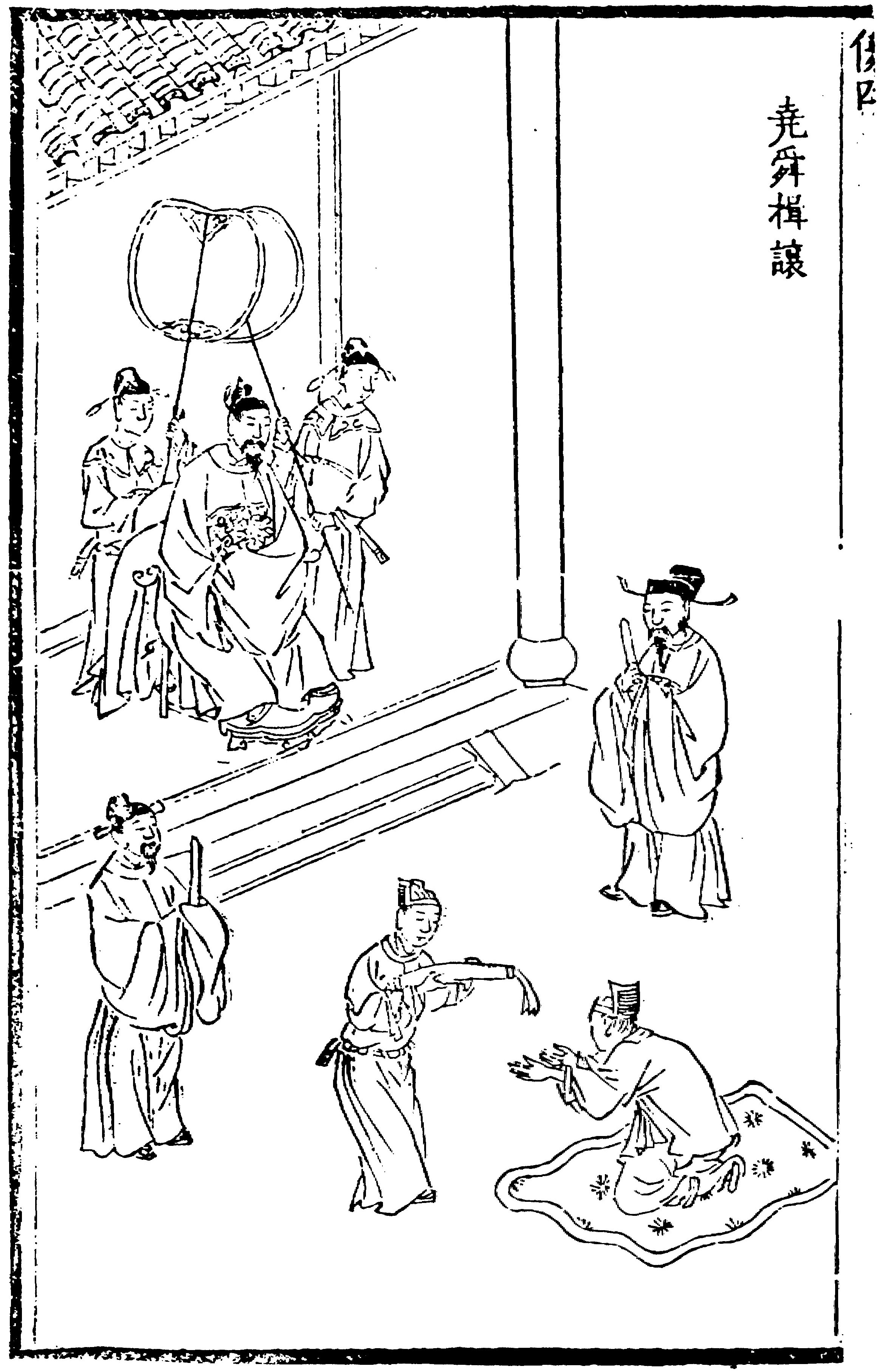
Emperor Yao abdicating to Chong Hua, 1736 illustration.

Sima Qian writes that the Taotang clan claimed descent from Emperor Ku of the Gaoxin clan, and the Book of Han states they were surnamed Gui (媯). Originally, Emperor Yao was enfeoffed in a state of Tao (陶), and later conquered a state of Tang (唐).

The Bamboo Annals records that upon Emperor Yao ascending the throne, he resided in Ji (冀), associated with Hebei today, and a historical location of the state of Tang. The clan enjoyed close relations with the Youyu clan, as well as the Qusou clan (渠搜氏) and Jiaoyao clan (僬僥氏). The Book of Documents records that Emperor Yao had ordered an individual named Xihe (羲和) to observe the stars. From these observations, the two determined that a year consists of 366 days. The Book of Han records that the Taotang clan had a Minister of Fire (火正) named E Bo (閼伯), who is sometimes identified with Xie of Shang.

Emperor Yao would consult with the Four Mountains (四嶽 or 四岳) for advice during his rule; whether these were actual mountains or ministers is unclear. One such case consisted of a severe flood which gripped the Chinese region for a considerable amount of time, and few were able to successfully control it. After repeated mistakes, Emperor Yao sent Gun, Earl of Chong to attempt to control it, who would fail after almost a decade of attempts.

Becoming old and unable to control the floods, Emperor Yao would consult with the Four Mountains again to find someone to abdicate to. He believed his son, Danzhu (丹朱), was unworthy and unfit to rule, and banished him to the Dan River. He eventually arrived at an individual named Chong Hua (重華). After testing him repeatedly, the emperor would deem him worthy, and abdicate, seemingly ending the Taotang clan. Chong Hua would be enthroned as Emperor Shun.

== Legacy ==
One descendant of Emperor Yao, named Liu Lei (劉累), was said to have tamed dragons, and founded the Yulong clan (御龍氏). This led to the Tangdu clan (唐杜氏), from which the Fan (范) and Du (杜) were said to originate. A son of Emperor Yao, Danzhu (丹朱), who was deemed an unworthy successor, also had his own lineage. Emperor Yao's mother was also deified.

According to the Book of Han, the state of Tang during Western Zhou is said to have maintained musical traditions from the period of the Taotang clan.

== Historicity and debated location ==
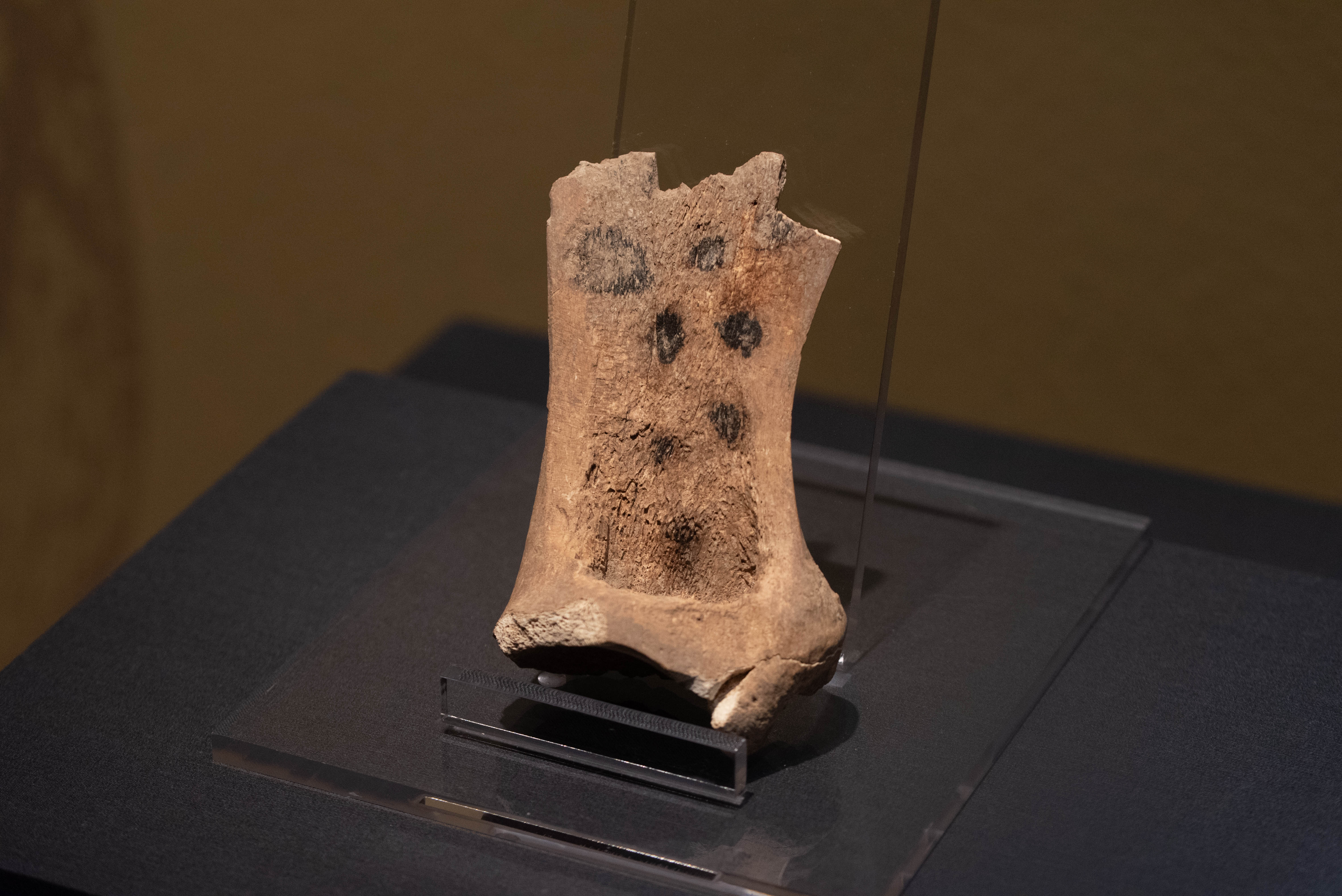
Bone used for scapulimancy from Taosi.

The historicity of the Taotang clan is debated, chiefly from the Doubting Antiquity School. The chief question comes from the lack of verifiable archaeological discoveries, as none of the alleged dig sites have surviving texts to name themselves. Gu Jiegang went as far as to argue that the abdication of Emperor Yao was a legend started by Mohists. Furthermore, the flood associated with the end of the Taotang clan, as described in texts, does not match with archaeological evidence when taken literally. Scientists such as Qinglong Wu connected the flood with the Jishi Gorge outburst flood, circa 1920 BCE, but this postdates traditional dates by several centuries, and neither the scale nor the location cleanly match the apparent location of the Taotang, Youyu, and Youxia clans that experienced it. However, the Chinese region did experience considerable typhoons around 3,000 BCE, which could explain the wording.

The Taotang clan's location is often identified with Taosi in Shanxi, which is known for its particular pottery styles and having what seems to be an ancient observatory, matching ancient descriptions of Emperor Yao's reign. One piece of pottery appears to have an early form of the character wen 文 "culture," though this is debated.

The State of Tang connection is dubious, as it is recorded as a Late Shang state, postdating the traditional history by several centuries. Zhang Kun therefore argues that the Taotang was located in northern Henan and associates it with the Hougang culture, Phase II.

Yu Taishan connects the Taotang clan with the Tocharian people who resided near the Chinese region.
