= Four Mountains =

Four deities, heroes or legendary mountains in Chinese mythology

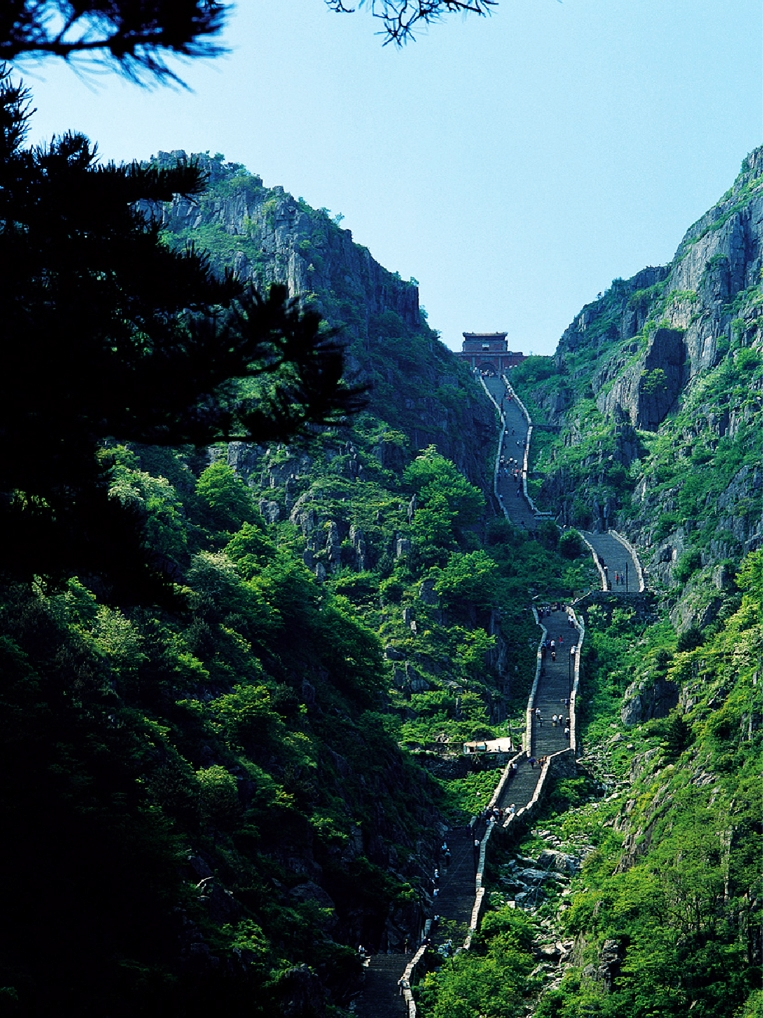
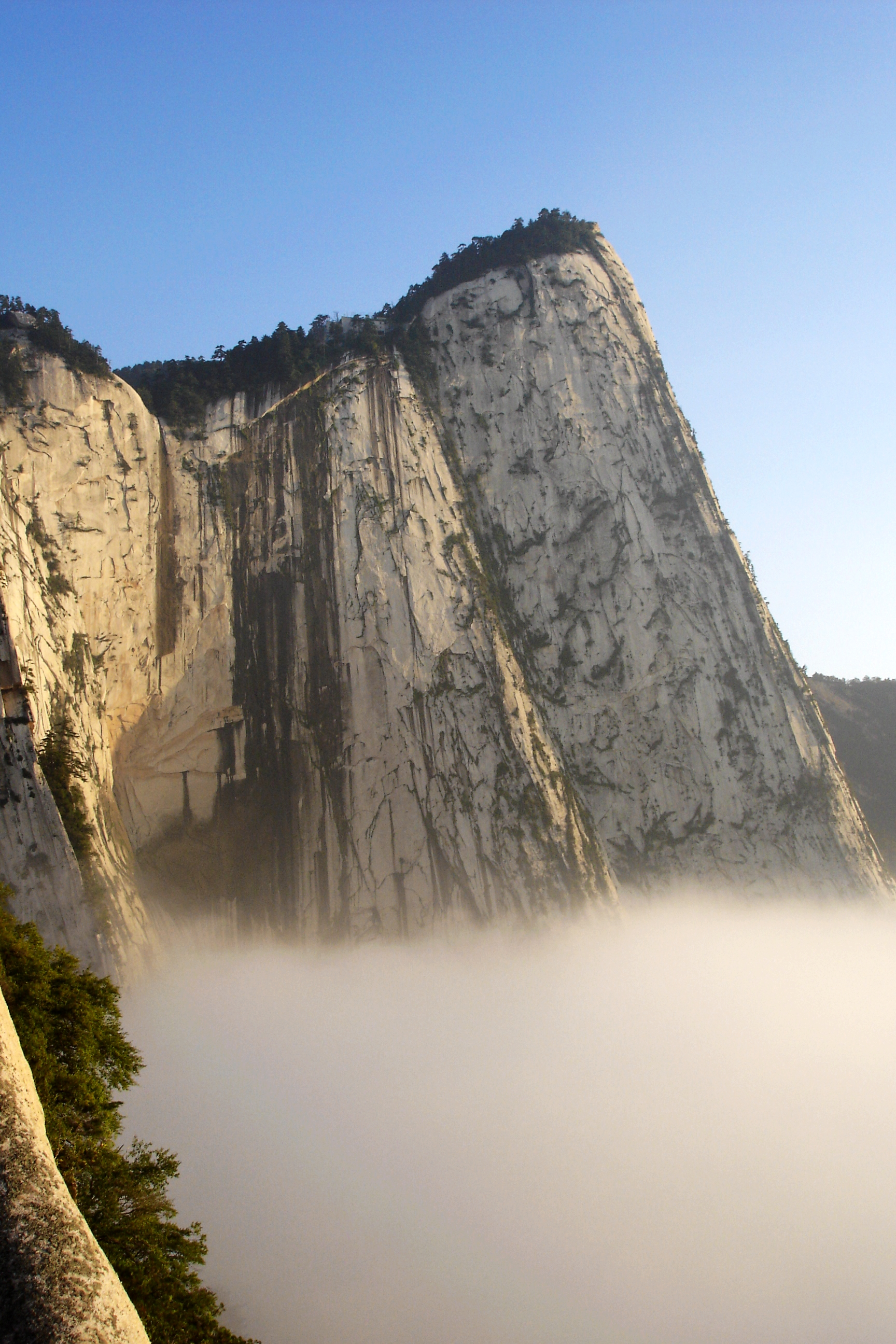
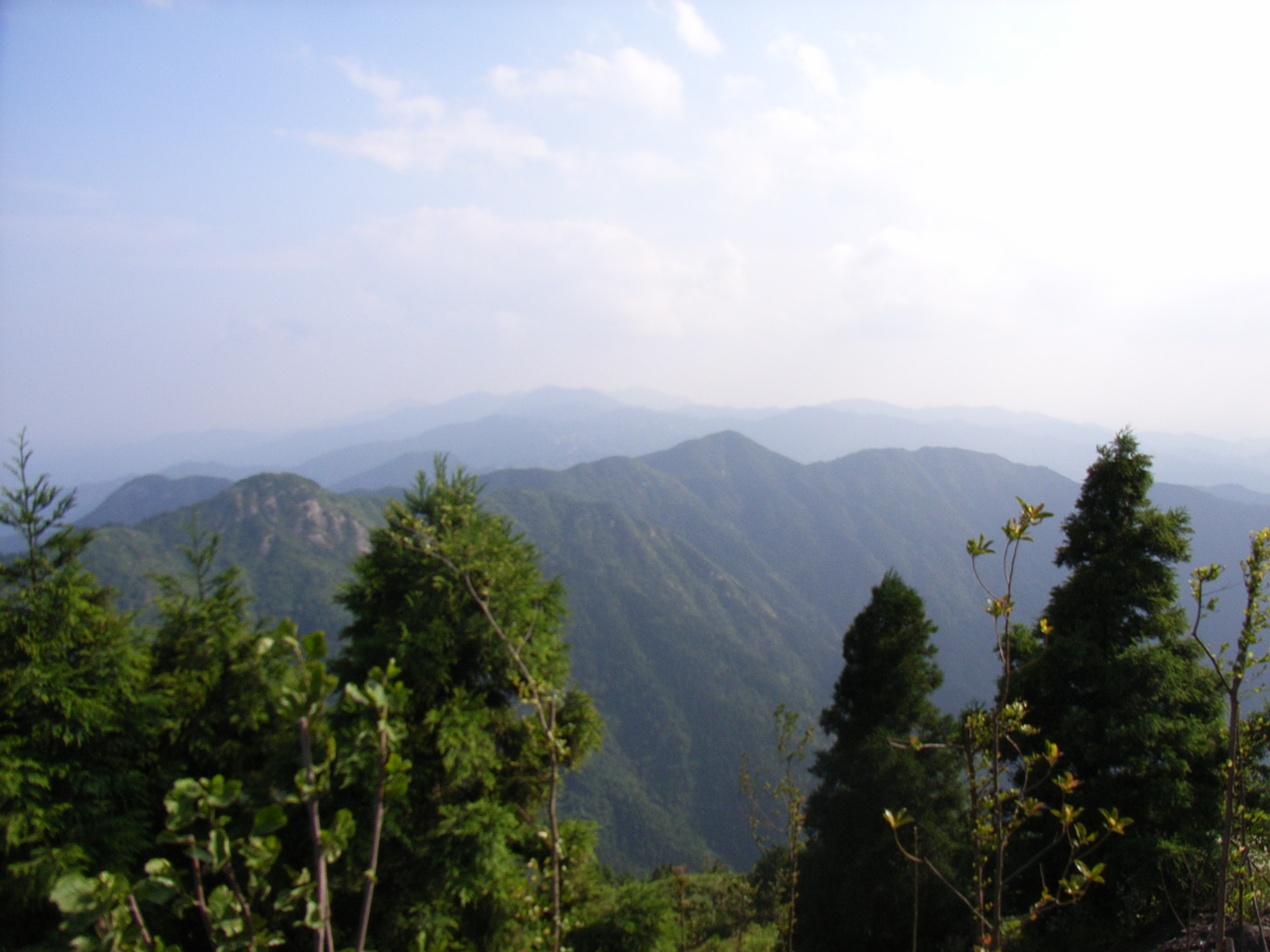
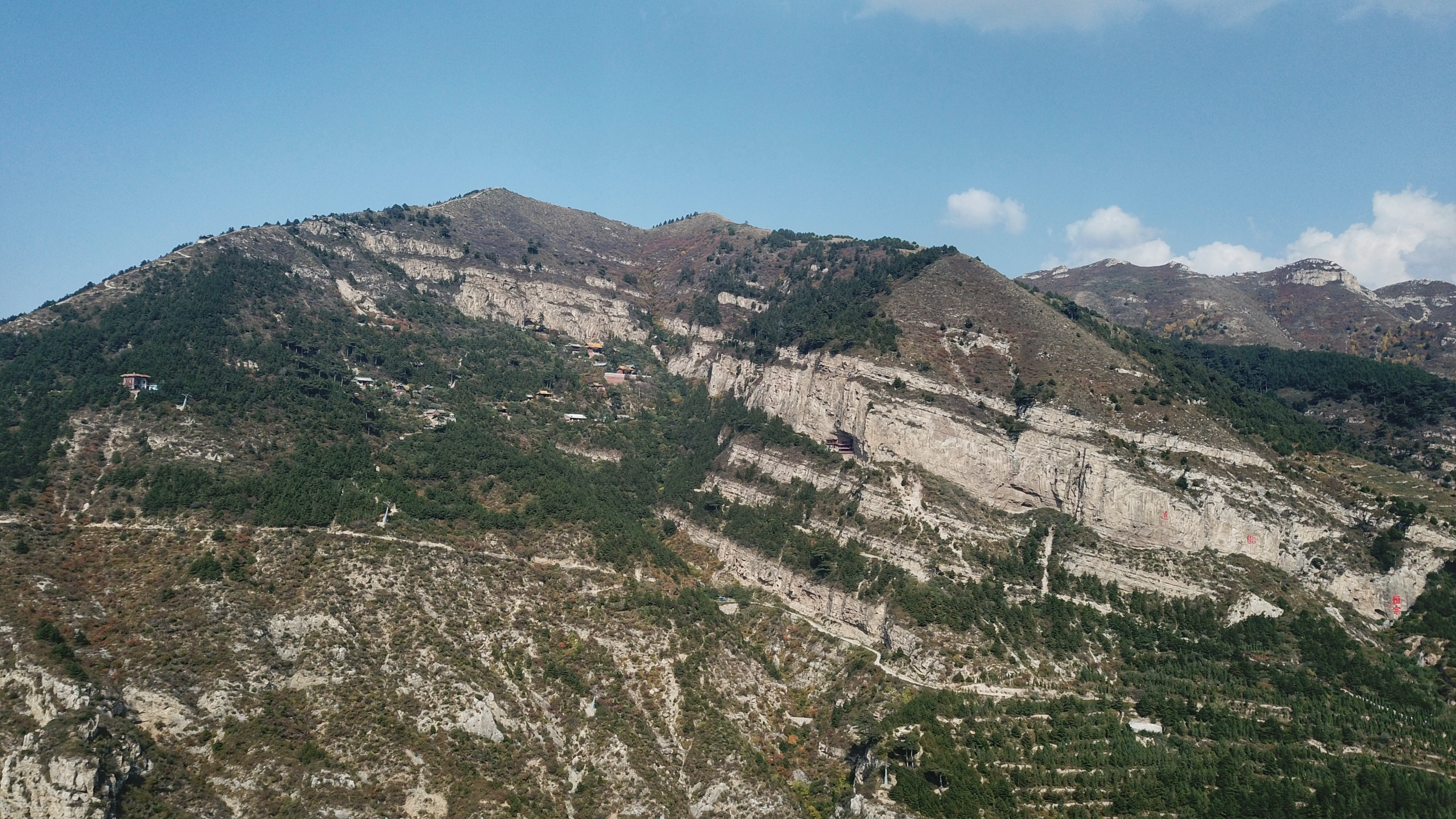
- Clockwise: Mount Tai, Mount Hua, Mount Heng (Hunan), and Mount Heng (Shanxi).
- Traditional Chinese: 四嶽
- Simplified Chinese: 四岳
Transcriptions
Standard Mandarin
- Hanyu Pinyin: Sì Yuè
Middle Chinese
- Middle Chinese: sijH ngaewk
Old Chinese
- Baxter–Sagart (2014): /*s.li[j]-s [ŋ]ˤrok/
- Zhengzhang: /*hljids ŋroːɡ/

The Four Mountains or Four Peaks (traditional Chinese: 四嶽; simplified Chinese: 四岳; pinyin: Sìyuè) are a set of deified mountains, variously interpreted in the Chinese classics, be it literally, as a ministerial position, or as a literal person or set of deities. They appear in the most ancient annals of traditional Chinese historiography and Chinese mythology.

== Name ==
The name "Four Mountains" in Chinese uses 四 (sì), the standard character/word for the number four, plus 嶽 (yuè), which refers to a great mountain, or the highest peak of a mountain — in contrast to the usual word for mountain, 山 (shān), which may also be used to refer to a mere foothill or other geological prominence.

== In traditional historiography ==
Mount Song, the Central Mountain.

The Four Mountains appear prominently in the Canon of Yao in the Book of Documents, where they are consistently written as 四岳. In this sequence, Emperor Yao of the Taotang clan is in the twilight years of his reign, faced with a devastating flood that cannot be stopped. He consults the Four Mountains for advice on who to enlist. They together suggest Gun, Earl of Chong, to do it, but after 9 years of attempts, he fails. Yao consults the mountains again, wishing to abdicate, and they together suggest Chong Hua of the Youyu clan, who would be enthroned Emperor Shun. Emperor Shun would make several offerings to the Four Mountains, and eventually ask them to suggest a person to be his Minister of Works. They would recommend Yu the Great, the son of Gun, who, according to the Bamboo Annals was dismissed from office by Yao for his failure. Gao Yao and Xie of Shang would assist Yu in his flood control efforts, ultimately controlling the floods via opening streams, forming the Nine Provinces.

The Erya identifies the Four Mountains as Mount Tai, Mount Hua, the Mount Heng in Henan and the Mount Heng in Shanxi. It additionally identifies Mount Song as the Central Mountain. This interpretation is compiled in Ministry of Education Mandarin Chinese Dictionary, produced in 1994.

== Interpretation ==
Yue in oracle bone script.

Mythologist Yang Lihui sees Four Mountains as four gods of a set of four mountains, with Four Mountains referring to the actual mountains themselves. K. C. Wu sees Four Mountains as being a ministerial position established by Yao to "oversee the mundane affairs of the empire", but points out that a real description of the functions of this position is lacking, nor is it certain whether there were one or four persons holding this ministerial position; however, he goes on to say that the evidence suggests the existence of four of them, and that they were charged with keeping themselves knowledgeable about what was going on throughout Yao's domain and advising him upon request. The importance of Four Mountains can be seen in the key role of selecting Gun to be the first to be put in charge of controlling the flood, then, later, in nominating Shun to be Yao's co-emperor, and later successor. Anne Birrell says that Four Peaks (alternate term for Four Mountains) is a "synonym for [the] ruling nobility of the four quarters of the world in the archaic era; also four mountains".

Oracle bones from the Late Shang period record a mountain deity named Yue (岳), identified with Mount Song, written using the same character used to refer to the Four Mountains in the Book of Documents. Manuel Rivera Espinoza concludes that the Four Mountains could be an innovation by the conquering Zhou dynasty, combining the Shang concept of the Four Directions (四方) with Yue.

== Cosmology ==
Anthony Christie relates the figure of Four Mountains to the Chinese cosmological idea of a square earth, with each of the peaks representing one of the four cardinal directions which the ruler would tour, and at which he would perform various imperial rituals, upon taking possession of his realm. The person or person(s) of Four Mountains being afterwards present in court then symbolized the completion of the ruler's having taken possession of his entire realm.

== See also ==
- Chinese mythological geography
- List of mythological Chinese mountains
- Sacred Mountains of China
- Kunlun Mountain (mythology)
- Xia dynasty
