= Gusou =

Father of Emperor Shun

Gusou 瞽叟
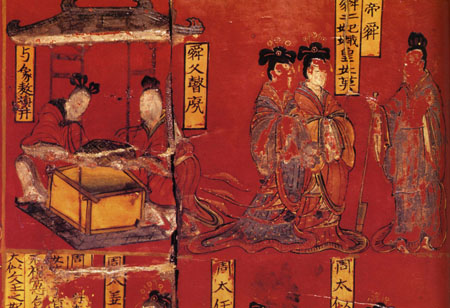
- Northern Wei depiction of Gusou and Xiang (left) with Emperor Shun (right), (c. 5th century).

Ruler of the Youyu clan
- Predecessor: Qiaoniu (橋牛)
- Successor: Chong Hua, Emperor Shun
- Spouse: Wodeng (握登)
- Issue: Emperor Shun; Xiang (象)
- Father: Qiaoniu (橋牛)

Chinese name
- Chinese: 瞽叟
Transcriptions
Standard Mandarin
- Hanyu Pinyin: gǔ sǒu
Middle Chinese
- Middle Chinese: kuX suwX
Old Chinese
- Baxter–Sagart (2014): /*[k]ˤaʔ s-ruʔ/
- Zhengzhang: /*kʷaːʔ suːʔ/

Gusou was a leader of the Youyu clan from the legendary Three Sovereigns and Five Emperors period of traditional Chinese historiography. He is said to have been the abusive father of Chong Hua, Emperor Shun.

== Name ==
"Gusou" (瞽叟) literally translates to "blind old man." Based on the traditions of employing the blind to serve as music officials in ancient China, it is believed that this was not necessarily a name, but a literal description of Gusou as a person. This is contrasted with Chong Hua, whose name means "dual pupils." Bamboo slips from the historical territory of Chu show numerous graphic variants of Gusou's name, usually phonetic loans.

== In traditional historiography ==
Chong Hua, Emperor Shun, the son of Gusou.

Gusou was married twice. He had three children: Chong Hua by his first wife, and Xiang and an unnamed daughter by his second. The bamboo manuscript Zigao (子羔), named after the person, records him as serving as a music official during his life. Lüshi Chunqiu records Gusou as mixing two guqin to make a musical style called Da Zhang (大章) to worship Shangdi during the reign of Emperor Yao. The excavated text The Changes of Emperor Shun (舜子變文) records Gusou regaining his sight through the touch of Chong Hua's tongue.

Gusou is recorded in texts such as Records of the Grand Historian as being abusive to Chong Hua, punishing him for even his smallest mistakes. Shuo Yuan records Confucius transmitting an account of Gusou flogging Chong Hua to Zengzi. Gusou would also attempt to kill Chong Hua on numerous occasions, in spite of Emperor Yao showering him with gifts and favour for his service to the Taotang clan. Sima Qian records an account of Chong Hua being made to climb to the top of a granary, wherein Gusou set fire to the base, forcing Chong Hua to escape. Liu Xiang notes that this attempt was made by having Chong Hua try to repair the roof of the granary and removing the ladder. On another occasion, Sima Qian records that Chong Hua went into a well, and Gusou and Xiang filled it with earth, to which Chong Hua escaped through the side passage; the two rejoiced thinking he was dead, and attempted to take the loot for themselves. Liu Xiang further records an attempt to kill Chong Hua whilst intoxicated, but Chong Hua did not get drunk. In spite of it all, Chong Hua would serve his father with utmost filial piety, never wavering despite the plots.

== Interpretation ==
Wang Chong questions why Chong Hua avoided trying to stop his father from killing him, surmising that it was because he could not foresee Gusou completing the act. However, in Shuo Yuan, Confucius is recorded as saying Chong Hua would escape Gusou's heavier hits, in hopes of saving him from committing the great wrong of murdering him, which would be more filial than simply taking those grave blows and submitting to his will.

Taking a Jungian perspective, Wang Pei interprets Gusou as an Earthly Father archetype; therefore, Xiang would be the Shadow. They note that the attempts to kill Chong Hua are too elaborate to be read straightforwardly, and they could instead be a shamanistic showing of ascending to heaven and descending to the underworld, given the spacial elements of the attempted murders.
