= Song of the South Wind =

Ancient Chinese verse

"Song of the South Wind" (南风歌，Nan Feng Ge) is a pre-Qin verse allegedly composed by the sage-king Shun. Its reference first appeared in Family sayings of Confucius. Qing dynasty scholar Cui Shu contended that the verse was not authored by Shun but by musicians and lyricists from later dynasties. The lines portray an ideal emperor in line with Confucian ideology.

南风之薰兮，可以解吾民之愠兮。
南风之时兮，可以阜吾民之财兮。

Translation:

The fragrance of the South Wind
Can melt people's woes.
The season of the South Wind
Can help my people's fortunes.

The first two lines describe how the gentle south wind brings both physical and emotional comfort, while the last two lines emphasize how this seasonal wind promotes the growth of crops, thereby aiding the people in building their fortunes.

Sima Qian remarked in the Records of the Grand Historian, Book of Music, that "Song of the South Wind" is a song on the emperor's virtue and benevolence to care for its people. Wang Su (王肃), a scholar during the Three Kingdoms era, and the editor of Family sayings of Confucius, echoed this view, stating that the "Song of the South Wind" is a poem about nurturing the people.

The "South Wind" became a symbol of a prosperous and harmonious society under the reign of sage kings. Later generations of poets including Wang Wei and Bai Juyi often referenced the "South Wind" as an ode to such an era.

== See also ==
- Nan Feng Chang
