= Jiaoji =

Jiaoji 蟜極
- Spouse: Juzi
- Issue: Ku
- Father: Shaohao

Jiaoji (? – ?) was an ancient Chinese figure and the son of Shaohao.

== History ==
According to the Records of the Grand Historian: Annals of the Five Emperors by Sima Qian, Jiaoji was the grandson of the Yellow Emperor and a son of Shaohao. Neither his father Shaohao nor him became the leaders (Five Emperors) of the Central Plains.

By the end of Zhuanxu's reign, Jiaoji's son Gaoxin (高辛氏) (or Qūn (夋)) succeeded Zhuanxu under the regnal name of Ku.

== See also ==
- Qiongqi
