= Nan Feng Chang =

Chinese guqin melody

"Nanfeng Chang" is a guqin (ancient Chinese zither) piece composed based on the ancient verse "Song of the South Wind", allegedly from the time of Emperor Shun.

Multiple guqin tablatures have recorded this piece expressing people's yearning for the ideal government that "governs without interference", as exemplified by Emperor Shun. Some of the more distinguished tablatures include The Complete Collection of Qin Music《琴書大全》, The Qin Anthology of Xilu Hall 《西麓堂琴統》, and The Supplement to the Grand Music of Xingzhuang 《杏莊太音補遺》, among others.

== The verse ==
The music was inspired by ancient verse "Song of the South Wind" (Nan Feng Ge, 南风歌), chanting: "The south wind blows gently, it can relieve my people's grievances; the south wind blows in season, it can enrich my people's wealth."

== The composition ==
The Qin Anthology of Xilu Hall interprets the piece as an ode to the wu wei style of governing of Shun: "Yu Shun (Emperor Shun), humbly seated facing south, played the guqin and sang, embodying the ideal of governance through non-action (wu wei). Thus, it is said that Shun played a five-stringed qin and sang the 'Song of the South Wind,' bringing peace and prosperity to the kingdom."
