= Gao Yao (minister) =

Ancient Chinese government minister

- 臯陶
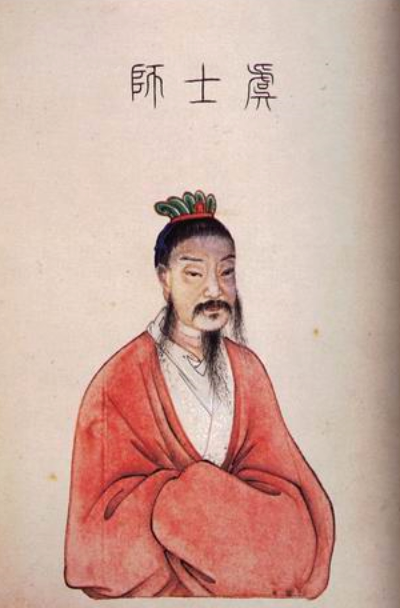
- Painting of Gao Yao, made during the reign of the Qianlong Emperor, Qing dynasty.
- Other names: Family name: Gao (臯); Given name: Yao (陶)
- Occupation: Minister
- Known for: Serving Emperor Shun

Minister of Law for the Youyu clan
- In office c. 2,255-2,120 BCE – c. 2,207 - 2,072 BCE
- Monarchs: Emperor Shun; Yu the Great

Chinese name
- Traditional Chinese: 臯陶
- Simplified Chinese: 皋陶
Transcriptions
Standard Mandarin
- Hanyu Pinyin: Gāo Yáo
Middle Chinese
- Middle Chinese: kau jeu

Gao Yao (traditional Chinese: 臯陶; simplified Chinese: 皋陶; pinyin: Gāo Yáo; Wade–Giles: Kao Yao), also known as Jiu Tao (咎陶), Gao Yao (皋繇) or Jiu Yao (咎繇), courtesy name Tingjian (庭堅), was the Minister for Law of Emperor Shun in Youyu clan-era China according to tradition. Gao Yao became a political senior advisor of Yu the Great. His father was Shaohao. He was considered the ancestor of the imperial house of Li of the Tang dynasty, which honoured him with the posthumous name Emperor Deming (德明皇帝).

== In traditional historiography ==
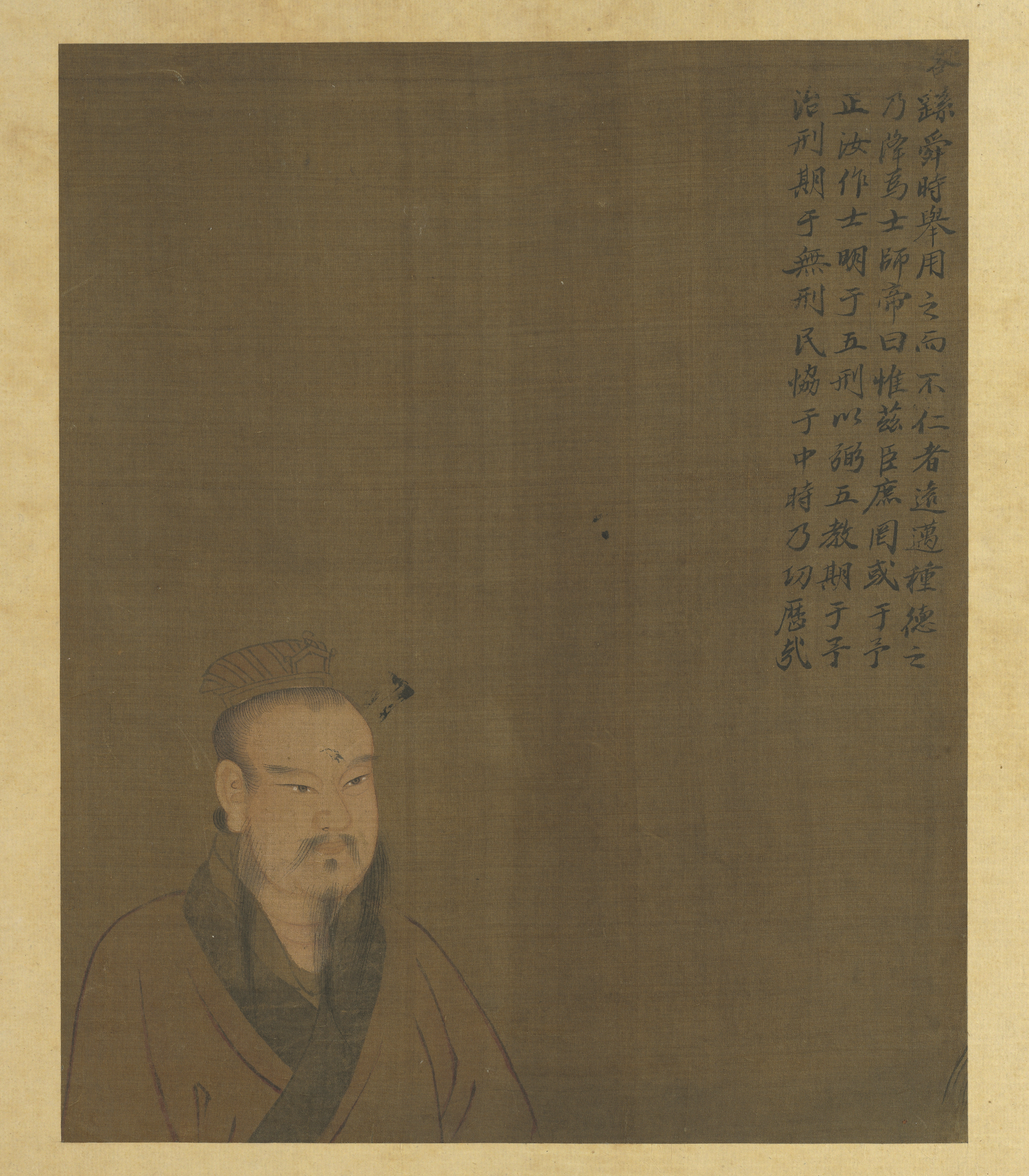
Portrait of Gao Yao (National Palace Museum)

Gao Yao served Emperor Shun very early into his reign, being recruited in the latter's third year to devise punishments and laws. Western Han scholar Shi You records these as prisons, which is annotated in the Guangyun as being two types called youfei (囿扉) and one called youtu (囿土). The Book of Documents records Gao Yao as putting the Five Punishments into practice against the manyi (蠻夷).

Later in the Book of Documents, Gao Yao has a dedicated chapter, detailing him giving counsel to Yu the Great. Here, he defines nine moral powers (九德) as a balance between seemingly opposing traits:

- Broad-minded yet discerning (寬而栗)
- Gentle yet firm (柔而立)
- Honest yet respectful (愿而恭)
- Chaotic yet reverent (亂而敬)
- Yielding yet steadfast (擾而毅)
- Upright yet warm (直而溫)
- Simple yet meticulous (簡而廉)
- Bold yet substantial (剛而塞)
- Resolute yet just (彊而義)

Gao Yao is cited as remonstrating Shun: "Heaven can see and hear, and does so through the eyes and ears of the people; Heaven rewards the virtuous and punishes the wicked, and does it through the people."

Taiping Yulan, a later source, records Gao Yao as having served Qi of Xia, giving now-lost quotes from the Guicang and Records of the Grand Historian.

== Identification with Ye the Great ==
Some Chinese scholars have argued he is the same person as Ye the Great, said by Sima Qian to have been the father of Fei the Great who was later known as Boyi. Ye was reckoned as one of the ancestors of the House of Ying in the Qin and of the ruling house of Zhao. Gao Yao is sometimes considered the father of Boyi.
