= Leizu =

Legendary Chinese empress

Leizu 嫘祖
- Spouse: Yellow Emperor
- Issue: Shaohao; Changyi

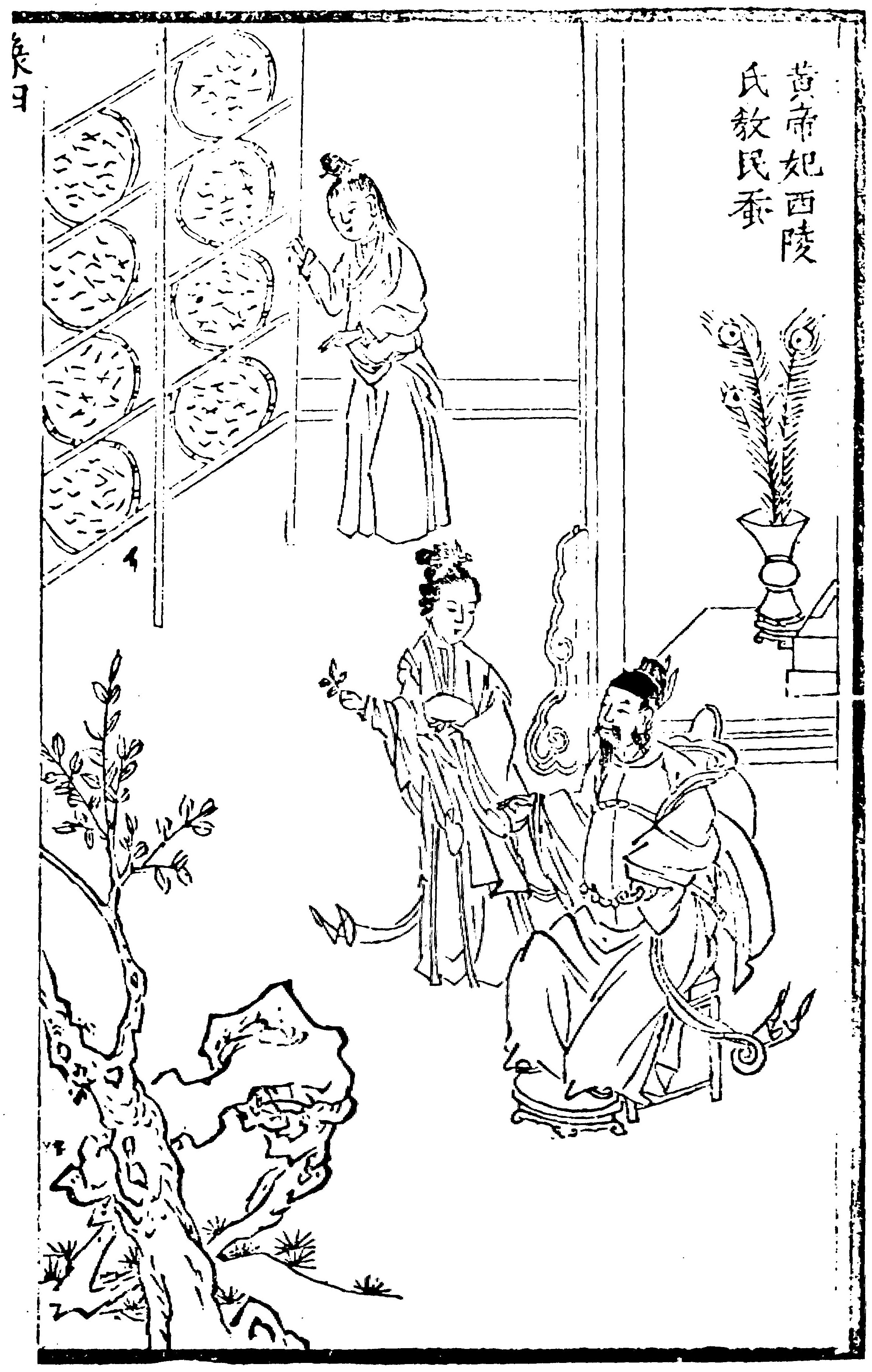
Illustration of Leizu teaching people to cultivate silkworms.

Leizu (Chinese: 嫘祖; pinyin: Léi Zǔ), also known as Xi Ling-shi (Chinese: 西陵氏, Wade–Giles Hsi Ling-shih), was a legendary Chinese empress and wife of the Yellow Emperor. According to tradition, she discovered sericulture, and invented the silk loom, in the 27th century BC.

== Myths ==
According to legend, Leizu discovered silkworms while having an afternoon tea, and a cocoon fell in her tea. It slowly unraveled and she was enchanted by it.

According to one account, a silkworm cocoon fell into her tea, and the heat unwrapped the silk until it stretched across her entire garden. When the silk ran out, she saw a small cocoon and realized that this cocoon was the source of the silk. Another version says that she found silkworms eating the mulberry leaves and spinning cocoons. She collected some cocoons, then sat down to have some tea. While she was sipping a cup, she dropped a cocoon into the steaming water. A fine thread started to separate itself from the silkworm cocoon. Leizu found that she could unwind this soft and lovely thread around her finger.

She persuaded her husband to give her a grove of mulberry trees, where she could domesticate the worms that made these cocoons. She is attributed with inventing the silk reel, which joins fine filaments into a thread strong enough for weaving. She is also credited with inventing the first silk loom. It is not known how much, if any, of this story is true, but historians do know that China was the first civilization to use silk. Leizu shared the art of silk with all of China and even other countries later on.

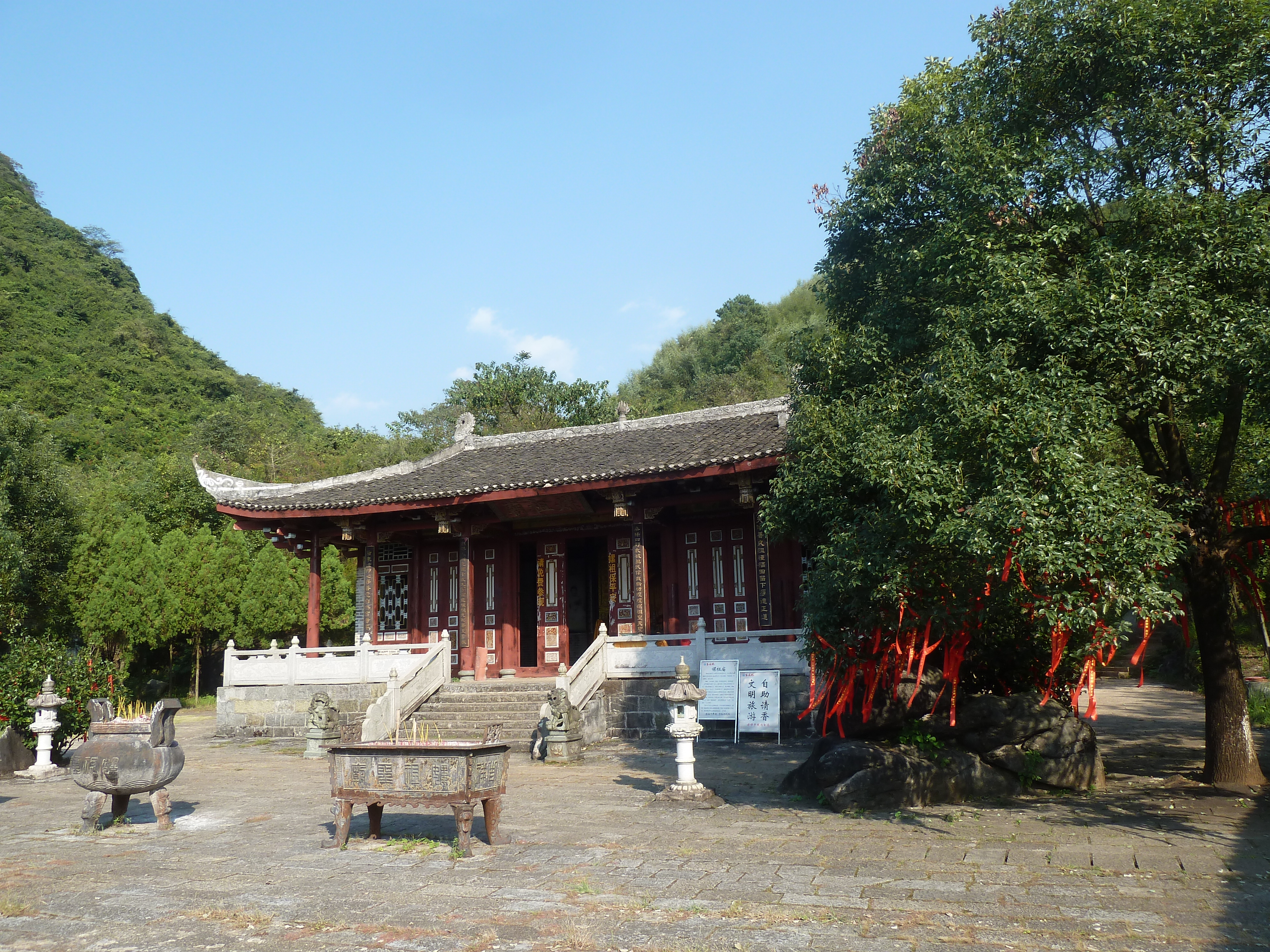
Leizu Temple in China

She is a popular object of worship in modern China, with the title of 'Silkworm Mother' (蠶奶奶; Cán nǎinai).

Leizu had two known sons with the Yellow Emperor named Shaohao and Changyi, with the latter the father of Zhuanxu. Zhuanxu's uncles and his father, the sons of Yellow Emperor, were bypassed and Zhuanxu was selected as heir.
