= Changyi =

Son of Yellow Emperor (Huangdi) and Leizu

Changyi 昌意
- Burial: Yu dynasty
- Spouse: Changpu
- Issue: Zhuanxu
- House: Youyu clan
- Father: Yellow Emperor
- Mother: Leizu

Changyi (? – ?) was the second son of the legendary Yellow Emperor and the father of Zhuanxu.

== History ==
According to the Records of the Grand Historian by Sima Qian, the Yellow Emperor had twenty-five sons, two of the known ones who were born to Leizu, the eldest son Shaohao, and the second son Changyi.

In the 29th year of the Yellow Emperor, Leizu gave birth to Changyi near Ruoshui (若水). In the 77th year of the Yellow Emperor, Changyi came to live at Sichuan by the Ruoshui. Later, Changyi married Changpu (昌僕), also named as Jingpu (景僕), of the Shushan clan. Jingpu gave birth to a son, Gaoyang.

Later, Changyi moved north to the Central Plains, and found the Changyi City (昌意城) (on the present day Leshanbei, Henan). Upon the passing of his father the Yellow Emperor, his brother Shaohao was said to have never actually reigned as king, according to the Records of the Grand Historian. Rather, Changyi's son Gaoyang was chosen as the tribe's new leader, with the regnal name of Zhuanxu.

Changyi is also said to have a son called Hanliu (韓流) in the Classic of Mountains and Seas.
