= Shaohao =

Legendary Chinese culture hero

Shaohao 少皞
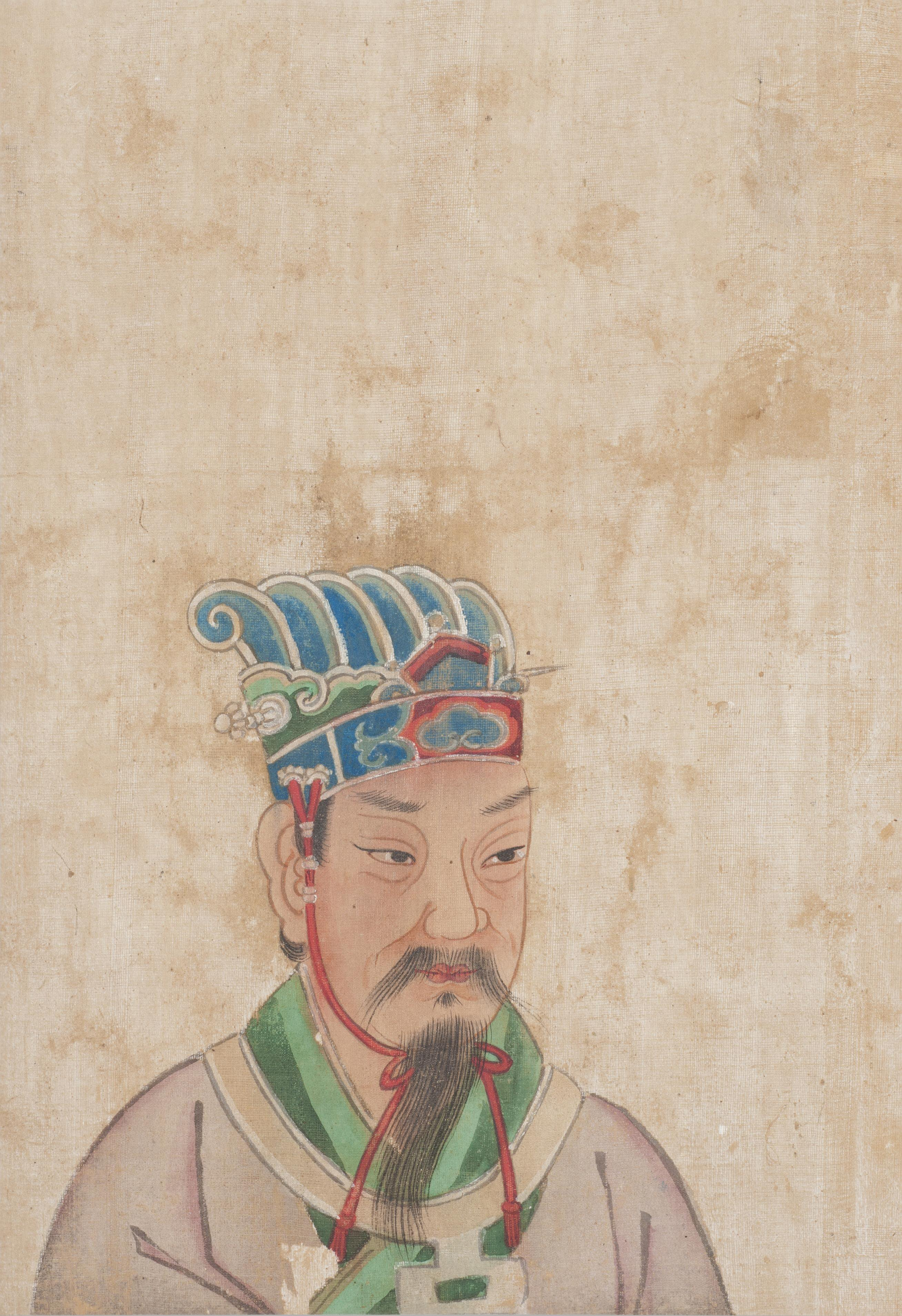
- A depiction of Shaohao from the album Portraits of Famous Men dated c. 1900, housed in the Philadelphia Museum of Art
- Predecessor: Yellow Emperor
- Successor: Zhuanxu
- Issue: Jiaoji
- Father: Yellow Emperor
- Mother: Leizu

Shaohao (Chinese: 少皞; pinyin: Shàohào; lit. 'Lesser brightness' (Note: Or 少昊. Compare 太昊; 太皞; Tàihào; 'Great brightness', an epithet of Fuxi.)), also known as Jin Tian (金天), was a legendary Chinese sovereign, usually identified as a son of the Yellow Emperor. According to some traditions, such as that within the Book of Documents, Shaohao is one of the Five Emperors. His place in the mythical lineage of the Yellow Emperor has been subject to controversy. Members of the 19th–20th century Doubting Antiquity School of historians posited that Shaohao was added to the orthodox succession legend by Liu Xin as part of a politically motivated campaign revising ancient texts c. 1 AD.

== Standard legend ==
Though its provenance can only be reliably traced from the 1st century AD onwards, the traditional story of Shaohao posits him as a son of the Yellow Emperor. Furthermore, he ruled as the leader of the Dongyi for 84 years, during which he moved the capital to Qufu. He was succeeded by his nephew Zhuanxu, the son of his brother Changyi.

However, the Shiji did not list an emperor between the Yellow Emperor and Zhuanxu. Shaohao is mentioned therein as a person living between the two fretting over an incompetent son, labelled as Qiongqi (窮奇; 'Extremely odd'). If Shaohao were to be identified with Xuanxiao (玄囂)—claimed by the Shiji to be the Yellow Emperor's eldest son—the incompetent Qiongqi would be identified with Jiaoji, Xuanxiao's only known offspring. Jiaoji was also passed over to serve as emperor; however, his son Ku, as well as his grandsons Zhi and Yao, would all ultimately become emperors.

The site traditionally claimed to be Shaohao's tomb is located in present-day Jiuxian village on the eastern outskirts of Qufu, most likely constructed during the Song dynasty. The site also includes Shou Qiu, a pyramidal monument marking the legendary birthplace of the Yellow Emperor.

== Alternative legends ==
In the Bamboo Annals, it is stated that Shaohao was not the Yellow Emperor's son but the son of a certain Lady Jie (女節), who miraculously conceived him after seeing a rainbow-like star flowing downwards onto Hua Islet (華渚).

Another legend says that his mother—the Weaver Woman, a star goddess—was a beautiful fairy named Huang'e, who fell in love with the planet Venus while drifting along the Milky Way. The two enjoyed many intimate nights together on her raft and they created a son. She soon gave birth to Shaohao, who grew up to be a handsome young man with a lot of potential. The Yellow Emperor—here his great-uncle—was so impressed with Shaohao that he named him God of the Western Heavens.

According to this telling, Shaohao created a kingdom in the five mountains of the Eastern Paradise inhabited by different types of birds. As ruler of this land, he captured the identity of a vulture, and other birds worked below him: a phoenix was his Lord Chancellor, a hawk delegated the law, and a pigeon was in charge of education. He deigned that the four seasons of the year would watch over the remaining birds.

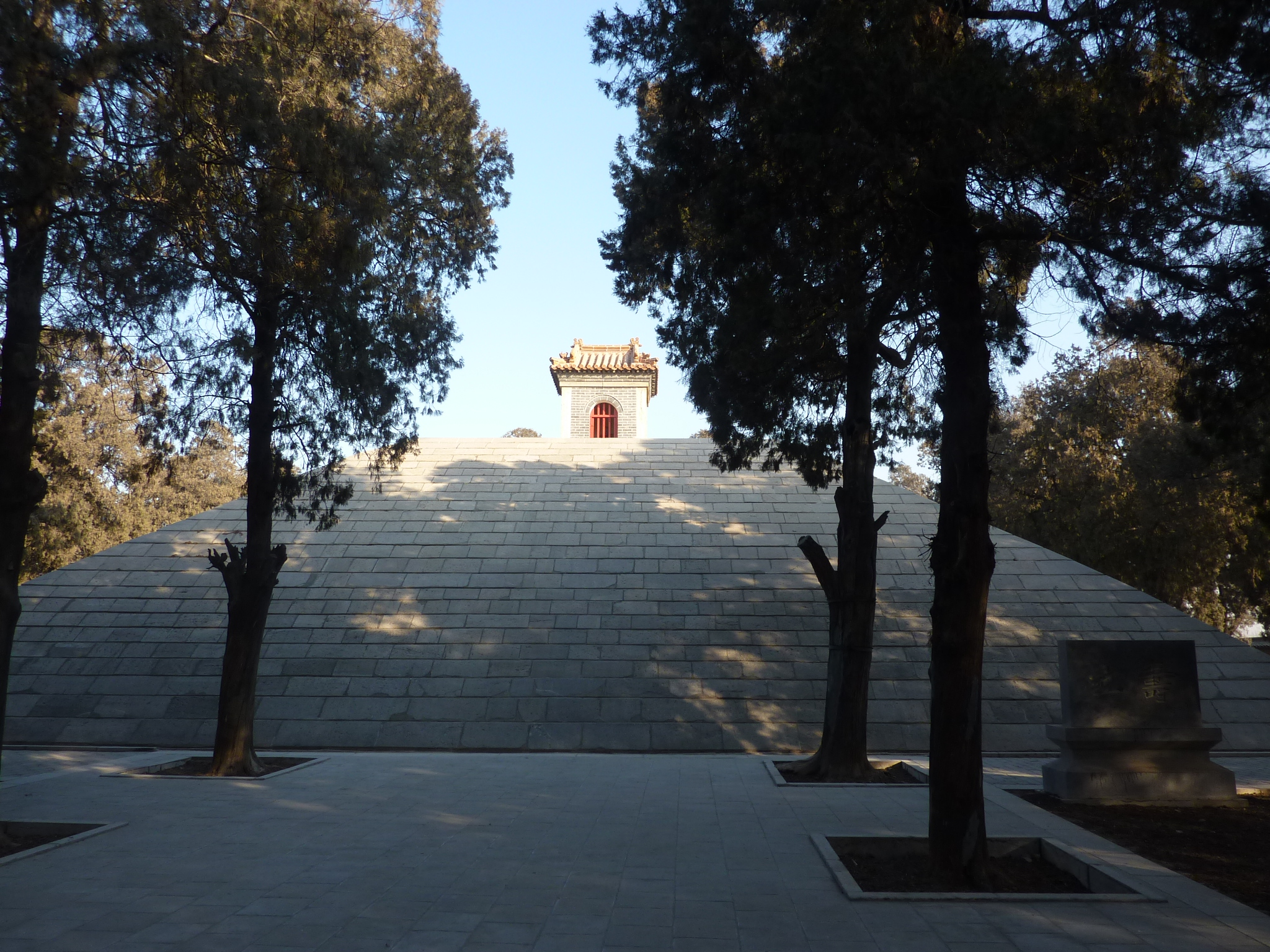
A stone-faced pyramid at the Shaohao Tomb near Qufu

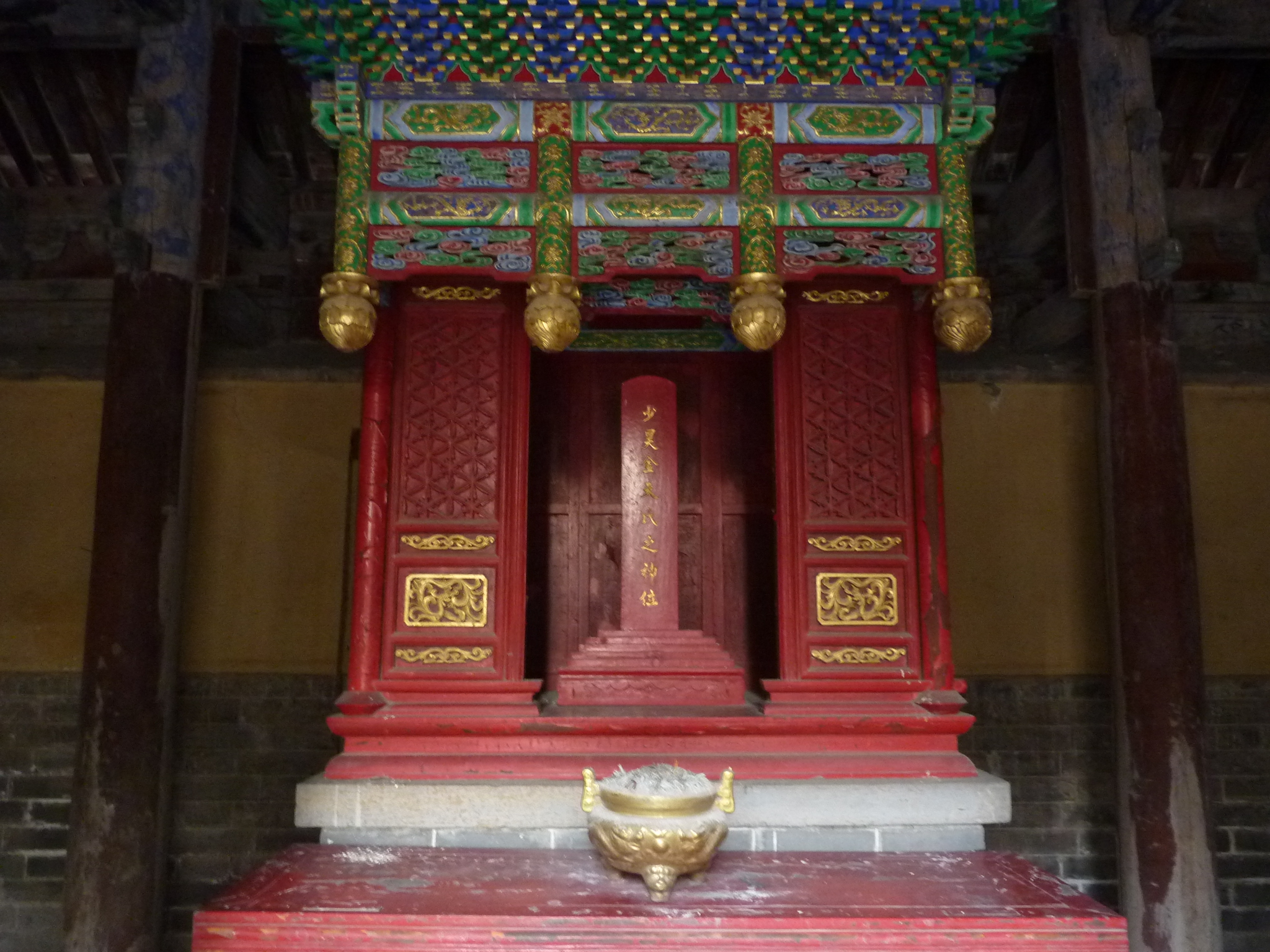
Traditional tomb of Shaohao

Although his kingdom was successful for many years, he moved back to the west and left his kingdom of birds to his son Chong. With a different son, Ru Shou, he made his home on Changliu Mountain, where he could rule over the Western Heavens. In union as father and son, they were responsible for the daily setting of the sun. In addition, Shaohao was thought to have introduced China to the twenty-five string lute.

== Historicity and historiography ==
While no modern scholarship accepts any part of the Yellow Emperor body of myth as describing historical events, traditional Chinese historiography viewed them as real. Shaohao's place in the succession is not dateable to early sources on the topic, and has its source in the so-called "Ancient Script Texts" only. In a theory that has since been discredited, by the Doubting Antiquity School, represented by Kang Youwei, Gu Jiegang, and Qian Mu, posited that Shaohao was inserted into the orthodox lineage during the Han dynasty by imperial librarian Liu Xin, as part of a wide-ranging campaign to revise ancient texts in order to justify the present monarch—either the Han imperial house, or the brief Xin dynasty that overthrew it. According to the theory, Liu Xin was keen to create a narrative which would satisfactorily reflect the five phases theory of dynastic succession, a "generative cycle" that rotated between different lineages, which would together legitimise the rule of either the Han, the Xin, or both.

There is debate whether that Shaohao was a real or legendary ruler of the Dongyi, a people who lived in eastern China. It is theorized that the worship of Shaohao was brought west into Qin by migration. Documentary evidence of Shaohao originates in the extant version of the ancient text Zuozhuan, but the lineage recited there that includes Shaohao is not corroborated by contemporaneous or earlier texts. The Doubting Antiquity School therefore theorizes that Liu Xin fabricated Shaohao from an existing but separate legendary figure, and inserted him into the early royal lineage during his edit of the Zuozhuan. More recent proponents of Shaohao's historicity cites tribal totems found in Dawenkou Culture sites resembling a proto-form of the character "hao".

== Legacy ==
According to the Samguk sagi, it is mentioned that Kim Yu-sin was a descendant of Shaohao.

== Notes ==
Shaohao Three Sovereigns and Five Emperors
Regnal titles
Preceded by Xuanyuan	Emperor of China	Succeeded by Zhuanxu
