= Lee Jun =

Lee Jun or Ri Jun may refer to:

- Yi Tjoune (1859–1907), Korean prosecutor and diplomat
- Lee Joon (d. 2003), South Korean businessman convicted of negligence in the Sampoong Department Store collapse which killed 502 people
- Joon Lee (born 1972), Korean American rapper
- Lee Joon (born 1988), South Korean actor
- Lee Jun (footballer) (born 1997), South Korean footballer
- Kweon Lee-jun (born 1997), South Korean snowboarder
