= Abdication system =

Historical Chinese political system

- Traditional Chinese: 禪讓制
- Simplified Chinese: 禅让制
Transcriptions
Standard Mandarin
- Hanyu Pinyin: Shàn ràng zhì

The abdicational system (Chinese: 禪讓制; pinyin: Shàn ràng zhì) was a historical Chinese political system. According to Chinese mythology, it was the system used by the Three Sovereigns and Five Emperors before the switch to hereditary rule in the Xia dynasty. Emperor Yao abdicated and chose Emperor Shun as his successor. Chinese archaeologist Feng Shi (冯時; 馮時) argues Qi of Xia had violently seized power and established a hereditary system after the death of his father Yu the Great, he argues this with traces of violence discovered around that time. The idea was most influential in the 4th century BC and declined in later periods.

According to Chinese mythology, following the rule of the Yellow Emperor, chieftains of different tribes in the Yellow River basin, including Yao, Shun, and Yu, came together to create a tribal alliance. Rather than engaging in warfare to establish dominance, these tribes opted for a more peaceful approach by selecting their leaders via an electoral process. This method drew its inspiration from the time-honored military democratic custom. In this system, the head of the tribal coalition was chosen through a democratic procedure involving representatives from each tribe.

A well-known instance of this mechanism at work is the resignation of Emperor Yao. As he aged, Yao sought to identify a successor who could carry on his legacy. He called upon the chieftains of different tribes and inquired, "Who can assume my role?" A minister recommended the skilled and righteous Shun, who was subsequently assessed and promoted to the rank of Emperor Shun.

This method facilitated a nonviolent transition of power, with the leader's role being transferred through dialogue and a democratic approach instead of through conflict and aggression. This system was widespread in ancient China, particularly during the advanced phases of primitive society.

A resurgence of curiosity in the abdication system has been sparked by the discovery of four brief texts unearthed in recent Chinese archeological excavations. Although the primary texts were lost in the burning of books and burying of scholars that took place between 213 and 212 BCE, the concept continued to be a part of political discussions throughout history.
