= Zhuanxu =

Legendary ancient Chinese emperor

Zhuanxu 顓頊
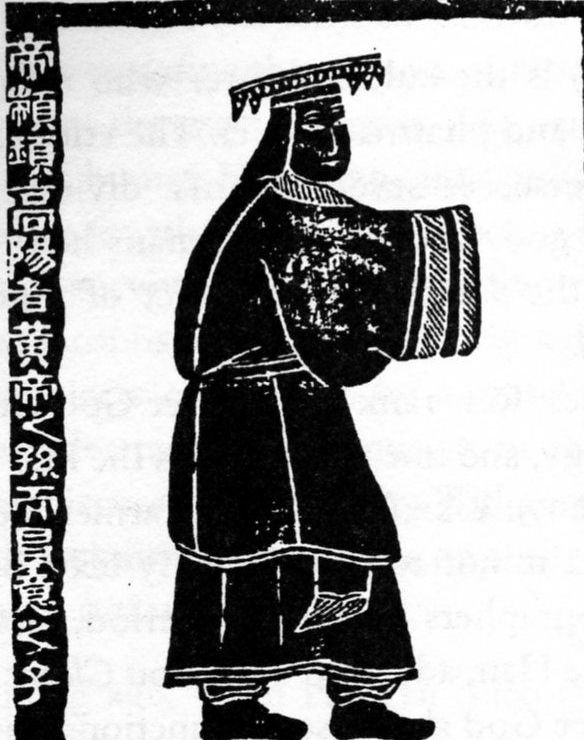
- Emperor Zhuanxu. Rubbing of mural bas-relief from the Wu Liang shrines, Han dynasty.
- Predecessor: Shaohao
- Successor: Ku
- Issue: Qiongchan
- Father: Changyi
- Mother: Changpu

Zhuanxu (simplified Chinese: 颛顼; traditional Chinese: 顓頊; pinyin: Zhuānxū), also known as Gaoyang (simplified Chinese: 高阳; traditional Chinese: 高陽; pinyin: Gāoyáng), was a mythological emperor of ancient China.

In the traditional account recorded by Sima Qian, Zhuanxu was a grandson of the Yellow Emperor.

== Association with Four Barbarians ==
At the age of ten with Shaohao, he was said to have led the Shi clan in an eastward migration to present-day Shandong, where intermarriages with the Dongyi clan enlarged and augmented their tribal influences.

He also was associated with a religious reform of the Jiuli (九黎) people, banishing witchcraft practised by the people.

== Family ==
Zhuanxu was the grandson of the Yellow Emperor and his wife Leizu by way of his father Changyi (昌意). His mother was named Changpu (昌僕) from the Shushan clan (蜀山氏), according to Sima Qian, and Niuqu (女樞) according to the Bamboo Annals. Zhuanxu is also alternatively said to be the son of Hanliu (韓流) in the Classic of Mountains and Seas. However, it is recorded in suspicious part Haineijing (海內經) that was written last.

Zhuanxu was claimed as an ancestor by many of the dynasties of Chinese history, including the Mi of Chu and Yue, the Yíng of Qin, the Cao of Wei, (Note: This last claim was made by the Wei Shu and Tung Pa but attacked by Chiang Chi, who claimed the Tian (田) were descended from Zhuanxu instead.) and the Qian of Wuyue.

== Reign ==
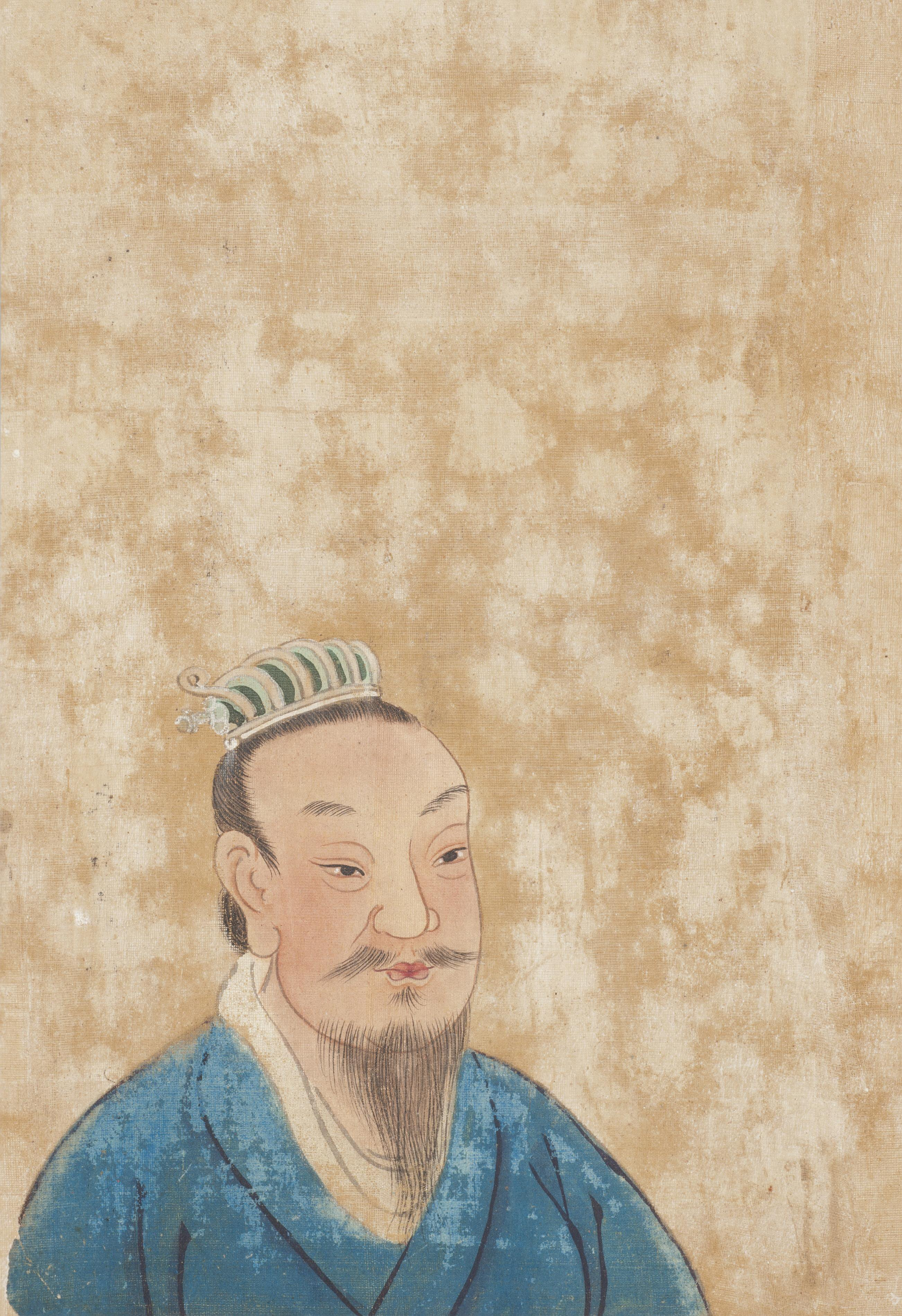
As depicted in the album Portraits of Famous Men c. 1900, housed in the Philadelphia Museum of Art

Zhuanxu is held by many sources to be one of the Five Emperors.

Some sources say that at age twenty, he became their sovereign, going on to rule for seventy-eight years until his death.

According to Sima Qian's Records of the Grand Historian (Shiji), upon the death of the Yellow Emperor, Zhuanxu's uncle Shaohao never reigned as king, as he was purported to do in other documents. Rather, Gaoyang was chosen as the tribe's new leader, with the regnal name Zhuanxu, in preference to his father and all his uncles. Zhuanxu defeated Gonggong, a descendant of the Emperor Yan.

However, the account in the Bamboo Annals states that Zhuanxu became an assistant to his uncle, Emperor Shaohao, at the age of ten, and became king in his own right at the age of 20.

Zhuanxu was credited with introducing the practice of sacrifice to soil and grain, which was essential to Chinese government until the fall of the Qing. He made contributions to a unified calendar, astrology, religion reforms to oppose shamanism, upheld the patriarchal (as opposed to the previous matriarchal) system, and forbade marriages between close kin. The Bamboo Annals also credit him with composing one of the earliest pieces of music, known as "The Answer to the Clouds (承雲)".

Zhuanxu was succeeded by his cousin, Shaohao's grandson, Ku. According to Shiji, Zhuanxu or Zhuanxu's lineage, had an incompetent son (不才子) derided as Taowu (梼杌; literally: "block-stump; blockhead"). Two other descendants of Zhuanxu were also named: one is Zhuanxu's son Qiongchan (窮蟬), from whom descended Emperor Shun; the other is Gun, father of Yu the Great. Emperor Yao had also criticised Gun for being incompetent and ruinous. Qiongchan was a commoner, though there is no account of his fall from grace. Eight of Zhuanxu's other descendants, unnamed yet of good repute, later worked for Shun.

== Calendar ==
The Bamboo Annals record that in the thirteenth year of his reign, Zhuanxu "invented calendric calculations and delineations of the heavenly bodies (歷象)".

Since Zhuanxu was claimed as a founder of the Qin dynasty, the new calendar system "zhuanxuli" (顓頊曆) was named after Zhuanxu by Shi Huangdi.

== Mythology ==
Zhuanxu is also mentioned along with god Taiyi (太一, 'Supreme First' or 'Unity'), the god of the Pole Star. The Three Sovereigns and Five Emperors were said to have been sent by Taiyi from the east to the land of the humans and thus considered to return to their original roles as gods of the seasons when their role in the land of the humans was done.In the lushi chunchu and book of rites he is depicted as managing the season of winter.The xuan ming is designated as the attending spirit and kidneys were considered the foremost sacrifice for the rites.

== Potential connection with Longshan culture ==
Zhuanxu is commonly associated with the mythical "separation of the Heaven from Earth" (絶地天通). According to the Lu Xing (呂刑) chapter of the Book of Documents:

We are told that the Miao (苗)… created oppressive punishments which pushed the people into disorder. Shang Di, the Lord on High… surveyed the people and found them lacking in virtue. Out of pity for those who were innocent, the August Lord (皇帝)… had the Miao exterminated. "Then he charged Chong (重) and Li (黎) to cut the communication between Heaven and Earth so that there would be no descending and ascending." After this had been done, order was restored and the people returned to virtue.

Several Chinese mythologists interpreted this myth as a representation or symbolisation of increasing social stratification. Before the "separation of Earth and Heaven", in Yangshao culture, every household could have or hire a shaman. However, during Longshan culture, shamans could only be hired by a few people, suggesting a monopoly of the ability to ascend to and descend from Heaven. In this sense, this myth may indicate the start of social stratification in ancient Chinese culture.

== Samguk Sagi ==
According to Samguk Sagi, the kings of Goguryeo regarded themselves as a descendant of Chinese heroes because he gave as his surname "Go" (Hanja: 高) as they were the descendant of Gaoyang (Hanja: 高陽) who was a grandchild of the Yellow Emperor and Gaoxin (Hanja: 高辛) who was a great-grandchild of the Yellow Emperor.

== See also ==
- Heidi ("Black Emperor") & Xuanwu ("Dark Warrior"), Chinese gods sometimes conflated with the North Star and Zhuanxu
- Pengzu, legendary ruler of part of Jiangsu under the Shang supposedly descended from Zhuanxu

Zhuanxu Three Sovereigns and Five Emperors
Regnal titles
Preceded by Shaohao	Emperor of China	Succeeded by Ku
