= Danzhu =

Danzhu 丹朱
- Father: Emperor Yao
- Mother: Nuying

Danzhu (Chinese: 丹朱; pinyin: Dān Zhū), surname Qi (祁) and given name Zhu (朱), was given the Fengjian state in Danyuan (丹淵), therefore got the honorable title in reference to the state. As the eldest son of the legendary Chinese monarch Emperor Yao (Tang Yao) who reigned traditionally c. 2356 – 2255 BCE, Danzhu studied Weiqi from his father.

== Bamboo Annals Documentation ==
The Central China under Emperor Yao's governance had been peaceful until Shun conspired an insurrection to usurp the throne. To carry out his scheme, Shun bad-mouthed Danzhu and made it known to Emperor Yao, intending to erode the harmony between father and son. As Shun gradually gained power, he blatantly asked Emperor Yao to abdicate, for him to ascend the throne.

The story of Danzhu is entwined with Shun – another distant relative to Yao through the Yellow Emperor; but one who was living in obscurity, despite his royal lineage. Shun succeeded in obtaining royal favour married Yao's daughter, and became emperor. According to the ancient Chinese text Han Feizi (韓非子) it was said that after the death of Yao "When the princes went to an audience at court, they did not present themselves before Danzhu, but before Shun; litigants did not go before Danzhu, but Shun; and the singers did not sing in praise of Danzhu, but of Shun." inferencing the virtuous attributes and authority of Shun.

The Bamboo Annals (Chinese: 竹書紀年; pinyin: Zhúshū Jìnián) represent Yao as having banished prince Danzhu to Danshui in his 58th year of his reign. They add that following Yao's abdication, Danzhu kept away from Shun, and that after the death of Yao, "Shun tried to yield the throne to him, but in vain." It was at this point that Shun invested Danzhu with Tang. However, an alternative account elsewhere in the Annals holds that Shun dethroned and imprisoned Yao, raising Danzhu to the throne for a short time before seizing it himself.

The Annals of Five Emperors (Chinese: 五帝本紀; pinyin: Wǔdì běnjì) which is part of Records of the Grand Historian by Sima Qian state that "Yao's son Danzhu and Shun's son Shangjun were allowed by Shun to have their own territories in order to offer sacrifices to their ancestors", The official Qiao Zhou proposed that Danzhu was given benefice at Tang (唐), while Shangjun's (商均) benefice was at Yu (虞).

Despite the fact that Danzhu did not succeed his father in most historical accounts, Danzhu is referred to with the title 帝 (Di, Emperor) in Zhou writings.

== Sources ==
- Wu, Kuo-Cheng (1982), The Chinese heritage, New York: Crown Publishers, Inc, ISBN 978-0517544754.
