= Emperor Shun =

Legendary ruler of ancient China, one of the Five Emperors

Shun 舜
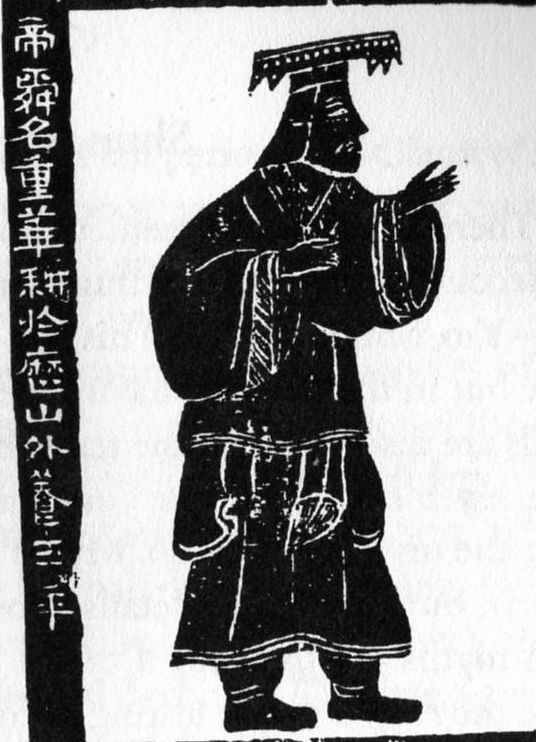
- Emperor Shun as depicted in Wu Family Shrines in Jiaxiang, Shandong, from the mid 2nd century AD.
- Predecessor: Emperor Yao
- Successor: Yu the Great
- Born: Yaoxu (姚墟)（Juancheng County, Heze City, Shandong Province）
- Died: Cangwu County (蒼梧)
- Burial: Jiuyi Mountains (九嶷山, Yunmeng (雲夢)
- Spouse: Ehuang (娥皇); Nüying (女英)
- Issue: Shangjun (商均)
Names
- Clan name: Youyu (有虞); Lineage name: Shi (氏); Given name: Chong Hua (重華)
- Father: Gusou (瞽叟)
- Mother: Wodeng (握登)

Emperor Shun
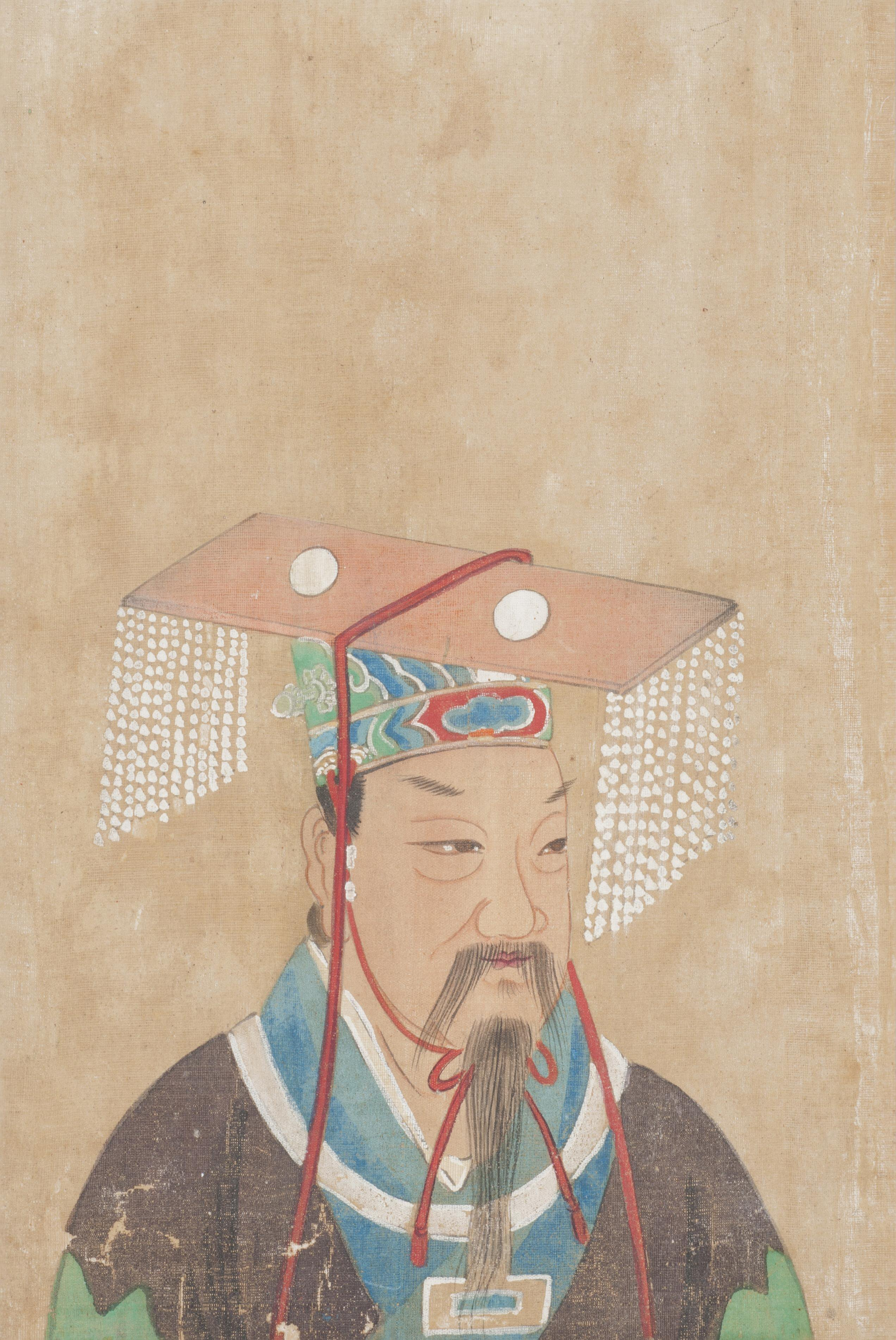
- Emperor Shun as depicted in the c. 1900 CE album Portraits of Famous Men, housed in the Philadelphia Museum of Art
- Chinese: 帝舜
Transcriptions
Standard Mandarin
- Hanyu Pinyin: Dì Shùn
- Bopomofo: ㄉㄧˋ ㄕㄨㄣˋ
- Wade–Giles: Ti^{4} Shun^{4}
- IPA: [tî.ʂwə̂n]
Yue: Cantonese
- Yale Romanization: Dai Seun
- Jyutping: Dai^{3} Seon^{3}
- IPA: [tɐj˧.sɵn˧]

Emperor Shun (Chinese: 帝舜; pinyin: Dì Shùn) was a leader of the Youyu clan of ancient China and is regarded by some sources as the last of the Five Emperors among the Three Sovereigns and Five Emperors. According to tradition, people bearing the surname Hu (胡) are descended from Emperor Shun. Later rulers of the Chen state and the Chen dynasty claimed descent from him.

In later centuries, Confucian philosophers praised Yao and Shun for their virtue. Shun was particularly noted for his modesty and filial piety (xiao 孝).

== Names ==
Shun's clan name (姓) was Yao (姚), his lineage name (氏) was Youyu (有虞), and his given name was Chonghua (重華). Shun is sometimes referred to as Great Shun (大舜), Yu Shun, or Shun of Yu (虞舜). "Yu" was the name of the fief that he received from Yao.

== Biography ==
Under Emperor Yao, Shun was appointed Minister of Instruction, General Regulator, and Chief of the Four Peaks, and is said to have brought state affairs into order within three years. Yao is said to have been so impressed that he appointed Shun as his successor. Shun reportedly wished to decline in favour of a more virtuous candidate, but eventually assumed Yao's duties. It was said that "those who had to try a lawsuit did not go to Danzhu, but to Shun." Danzhu was the son of Yao.

Shun is said to have received the mantle of leadership from Emperor Yao at the age of 53 and died at the age of 100. Before his death, Shun is recorded as having relinquished his seat of power to Yu (禹), the founder of the Xia dynasty. Shun's capital was located in Puban (蒲阪), which is now in Shanxi (山西).

After ascending to the throne, Shun is said to have offered sacrifices to the god Shang Di (上帝), as well as to the hills, rivers, and spirits (神). He then toured the eastern, southern, western, and northern parts of the country, where he offered burnt offerings to Heaven at each of the four peaks (Mount Tai, Mount Huang, Mount Hua, and Mount Heng), sacrificed to the hills and rivers, regulated the seasons, months, and days, established uniform measurements of length and capacity, and reinforced ceremonial laws.

Shun divided the land into twelve provinces, raising altars on twelve hills and deepening the rivers. Shun dealt with the Four Perils by banishing Gonggong to the You Prefecture, confining Huandou (驩兜) on Mount Chong (宗山), executing or imprisoning Gun (who remained a prisoner until his death on Feather Mountain (羽山), and driving the Sanmiao tribe into Sanwei Mountain. Gun's son, Yu (禹), was subsequently appointed Minister of Works (共工), responsible for governing the water and land. Later, Shun appointed Yu as General Regulator (often translated as Prime Minister). Yu wished to decline in favour of the Minister of Agriculture or Xie (契), or Gao Yao, but finally accepted upon Shun's insistence. Shun then appointed Chui (垂) as Minister of Works (共工). Shun also appointed Yi as Minister of Animal Husbandry, Bo-yi as Priest of the Ancestral Temple, Hui as Director of Music, and Long as Minister of Communications.

According to the Canon of Shun, Shun began to reign at the age of 30, reigned jointly with Yao for 30 years, and reigned a further 50 after Yao's abdication before Shun's death. The Bamboo Annals state that Yao chose Shun as his heir three years before abdicating the throne. Both sources agree that after abdicating, Yao lived for a further 28 years in retirement during Shun's reign.

== Legends ==
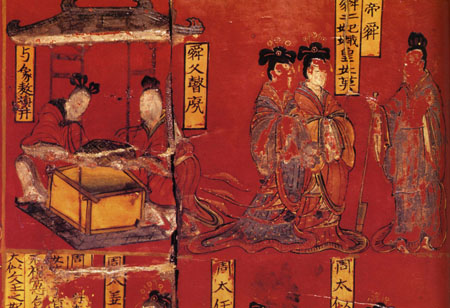
Northern Wei depiction of Shun with his father, Gusou.

Sima Qian, in Annals of the Five Emperors (五帝本紀), claimed that Shun was descended from the Yellow Emperor through the latter's grandson Emperor Zhuanxu. The Bamboo Annals (048) record the name of his mother as Wodeng (握登), and Shun's birthplace as Yaoxu (姚墟). Wodeng died when Shun was young. Shun's father Gusou (瞽叟, literally "blind elder") remarried soon after his mother's death. Shun's stepmother then gave birth to his half-brother Xiang (象) and half-sister. Shun's stepmother and half-brother treated him harshly, often forcing Shun to do all the hard work in the family and giving him only the worst food and clothing. Shun's father, being blind and elderly, was often unaware of his good deeds and frequently blamed him for everything. Yet, despite these conditions, Shun is said to have never complained and always treated his father, stepmother, and half-brother with kindness and respect.

According to later traditions, Shun's stepmother expelled him from the household when he was a young adult. Shun subsequently lived on his own. Traditional accounts portray Shun as possessing qualities that attracted followers and enabled him to promote cooperation among the people wherever he went. According to tradition, Shun's presence in a pottery village was associated with improvements in the quality of its pottery within a year. Tradition holds that, when Shun arrived at a fishing village, disputes over fishing grounds had resulted in violence among its inhabitants. According to these accounts, Shun promoted the sharing and allocation of fishing resources, after which the disputes came to an end and the village prospered.

According to tradition, when Emperor Yao grew older, he became concerned that his sons spent much of their time engaging in wine and song. Yao asked his ministers, known as the Four Mountains, to propose a suitable successor. Yao then heard accounts concerning Shun. According to tradition, Yao chose to test Shun rather than rely solely on these accounts. Tradition states that Yao granted Shun a district to govern and married his two daughters to him, providing a new house and money as a dowry.

According to tradition, despite receiving an office and financial support, Shun continued to live humbly. Tradition holds that he continued to work in the fields daily. These accounts state that Shun persuaded his wives, the princesses Ehuang (娥皇, Fairy Radiance) and Nüying (女英, Maiden Bloom), daughters of Yao, to adopt a humble lifestyle and work alongside the people. According to tradition, Shun's stepmother and half-brother became jealous and conspired to kill him. One tradition states that Shun's half-brother Xiang set fire to a barn and persuaded Shun to climb onto the roof to extinguish the fire before removing the ladder and trapping him there. According to the legend, Shun fashioned a makeshift parachute from his hat and clothing and descended safely. Another tradition relates that Xiang and his mother conspired to intoxicate Shun, throw him into a dry well, and bury him with rocks and soil. Tradition holds that Shun's half-sister, who disapproved of her mother and brother's plans, informed his wives about the plot. Shun then prepared for the attempt on his life. According to the legend, Shun feigned intoxication and escaped through a tunnel that he had prepared in advance. Traditional accounts describe Shun as surviving several attempts on his life while never blaming his stepmother or half-brother and forgiving them on each occasion.

Traditional accounts state that Shun's stepmother and half-brother eventually repented of their past wrongs. Shun forgave them and helped Xiang obtain an official position. Accounts also describe Shun as reforming Emperor Yao's nine sons and turning them into productive members of society.

According to tradition, Emperor Yao was impressed by Shun's achievements and chose him as his successor, enthroning him in the year of Jiwei (己未). Yao's capital was located in Ji (冀), in what is now Shanxi province.

Tradition also attributes the creation of Dashao (大韶), a symphony performed with nine Chinese instruments, to Shun.

In the final year of his reign, Shun is said to have undertaken a tour of the country, and is said to have died of an illness during the journey near the Xiang River. According to tradition, both of his wives came to the site of his death and mourned beside the river for several days. Legend holds that their tears turned into blood and stained the reeds along the river. The legend attributes the origin of spotted bamboo to this event. According to the legend, both women, overcome by grief, drowned themselves in the river.

Shun is said to have considered his son Shangjun (商均) unworthy and instead picked Yu, known for managing floods, as his heir.

== Descendants ==
According to tradition, the Hu people are descendants of Emperor Shun. Gui Man, a direct descendant of Shun, became known as Chen Hugong (Duke Hu of Chen) and founded the State of Chen. Later emperors of the Chen dynasty, such as Chen Baxian, also claimed descent from Shun.

Hồ is the Sino-Vietnamese pronunciation of (胡) Hú. Hồ Quý Ly, the founder of the Hồ dynasty, also claimed descent from Duke Hu of Chen and, by extension, from Shun. The Hồ family in Vietnam originated in China's Zhejiang Province around the 10th century.

The Tian (田) and Yuan (袁) lineages also claim descent from the State of Chen.

== Legends related to Emperor Yao ==
Emperor Shun
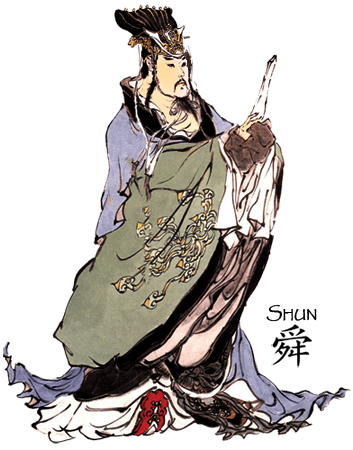
- Modern depiction of Emperor Shun

The 3rd-century BCE Confucian philosopher Mencius described an alternative tradition concerning Emperor Shun, characterising him as an "Eastern barbarian" based on the belief that Shun was born in the eastern Chu Feng region before moving west and rising to prominence. In this tradition, Emperor Yao tested Shun's filial piety by sending him valuable gifts, including his own sons and daughters, in an attempt to draw Shun away from his family. However, Shun continued to long for his parents, which demonstrated the strength of his character in Yao's eyes. Mencius also held that Shun did not formally assume the title of emperor until after Yao's death, as he believed a state could not have two concurrent rulers.

Two later sources, the Bamboo Annals (299 BCE) and writings from Chinese Legalist Han Fei (280-233 BCE), portray Shun's relationship with Emperor Yao differently. Both sources describe Shun as overthrowing Yao and leaving the former emperor imprisoned until his death. Han Fei's account also describes a battle in which Shun defeats and banishes Yao's son and heir, Danzhu, who later leads a successful rebellion against Shun, leading to Shun's defeat. This account was later referenced in Li Bai's poem "Distant Parting" (遠別離).

== Events of Shun's reign ==
According to the Bamboo Annals, several notable events are recorded during Shun's fifty-year reign.

In the 3rd year of his reign, Shun ordered Jiutao (咎陶) to establish penalties for criminal offences. In the ninth year, the Queen Mother of the West is said to have visited and presented white jade rings and jue (玦) as gifts. Various internal reforms are said to have taken place during the following years. Yu of Xia was appointed to manage disasters caused by floods and storms. Shun appointed Houshi (后氏) to oversee the construction of a palace, and two years later, dancing was introduced into schools.

In the twenty-fifth year, an envoy of the Xishen (息慎) tribe is said to have presented a bow and arrow as gifts. Four years later, Shun appointed Ziyi (子义) as duke in Shang. A year later, Shun's wife, Mang (盲), died and was commemorated with a tomb at Wei (渭). Two years later, Shun transferred military authority to Yu of Xia.

In the thirty-fifth year of his reign, Shun ordered Yu of Xia to send troops against Youmiao (有苗). Following Yu's victory, Youmiao sent an envoy seeking incorporation into Shun's realm. Shun ordered the destruction of a defensive wall, distinct from the later Great Wall of China. In the forty-second year of his reign, the Xuandu (玄都) people are said to have presented precious jade as gifts. Tradition holds that the winter of the forty-seventh year of his reign was unusually warm and that the grass did not die.

Two years later, Shun moved to Mingtiao (鸣条), a place later known as Haizhou (海州) during the Warring States period. Shun died the following year, after a reign described as having lasted fifty years.

== See also ==
- Cangwu County
- Chen (surname)
- Chinese mythology
- Emperor Yao
- Great Flood (China)
- Imperial examination in Chinese mythology
- Jiuyi Mountains
- Xiang River
- Xiang River goddesses
- Yu the Great

== Notes ==
Emperor Shun Three Sovereigns and Five Emperors
Regnal titles
Preceded by Yao	Emperor of China	Succeeded by Yu
