= Chinese mythology =

Mythology of the greater Chinese area

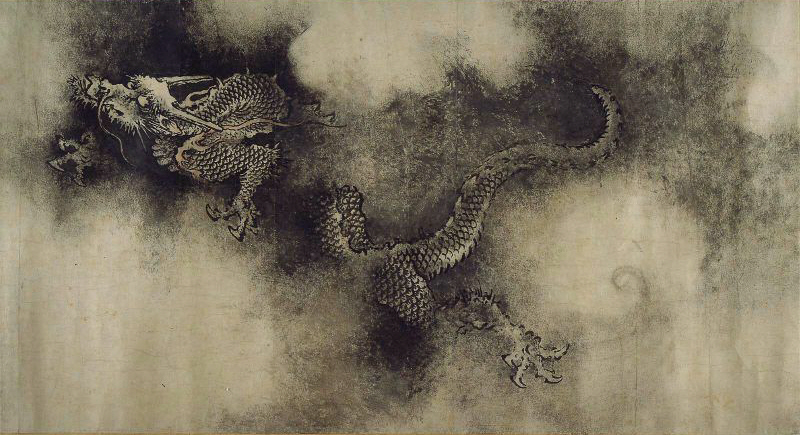
Nine Dragons, handscroll section, by Chen Rong, AD 1244, Song dynasty, Museum of Fine Arts, Boston

Chinese mythology (traditional Chinese: 中國神話; simplified Chinese: 中国神话; pinyin: Zhōngguó shénhuà), is mythology that has been passed down in oral form or recorded in literature throughout the area now known as Greater China. Chinese mythology encompasses a diverse array of myths derived from regional and cultural traditions. Populated with engaging narratives featuring extraordinary individuals and beings endowed with magical powers, these stories often unfold in fantastical mythological realms or historical epochs. Similar to numerous other mythologies, Chinese mythology has historically been regarded, at least partially, as a factual record of the past.

Along with Chinese folklore, Chinese mythology forms an important part of Chinese folk religion and of religious Taoism. Many narratives recounting characters and events from ancient times exhibit a dual tradition: one that presents a more historicized or euhemerized interpretation, and another that offers a more mythological perspective.

Numerous myths delve into the creation and cosmology of the universe, exploring the origins of deities and heavenly inhabitants. Some narratives specifically address the topic of creation, unraveling the beginnings of things, people, and culture. Additionally, certain myths are dedicated to the genesis of the Chinese state. A subset of myths provides a chronology of prehistoric times, often featuring a culture hero who taught people essential skills ranging from building houses and cooking to the basics of writing. In some cases, they were revered as the ancestor of an ethnic group or dynastic families. Chinese mythology is intimately connected to the traditional Chinese concepts of li and qi. These two foundational concepts are deeply entwined with socially oriented ritual acts, including communication, greetings, dances, ceremonies, and sacrifices.

== Classification ==
- Ancient myths: Pangu creating the world with his body, Nuwa mending the sky and creating human beings, Jingwei filling the sea, Kuafu chasing the sun, Dayu controlling the flood, Gonggong hitting Mount Buzhou in anger, the Three Sovereigns and Five Emperors, Shennong tasting hundreds of herbs, Cangjie creating characters, Xingtian dancing with Ganqi, Suiren drilling wood to make fire, Yugong moving the mountains, and many other famous myths.
- Folk myths and legends: The Legend of the White Snake, The Cowherd and the Weaver Girl, Chang'e Flying to the Moon, Houyi Shooting the Sun, Wu Gang Cutting the Cassia Tree, Meng Jiangnu, Weeping Down the Great Wall, Drilling Two Woods to Make Fire, Black Dog Eating the Moon, The Butterfly Lovers, Foolish Old Man Moving Mountains, Goddess of Luo River and Mi Fei, King Mu's Journey to the West, Magu Offering Longevity, Danzhu Turning into a Bird, The Slaying of the Unicorn, Lark Exterminating the Dragon, King Wang's Crying Cuckoo, The Acacia Tree, Jigong, The Legend of New Year's Eve, The Twelve Chinese Zodiac Signs, The Carp Leaping over the Dragon Gate, The Money Tree and the Treasure Bowl, The Seven Brothers of the Yang Family, The Five Brothers, The Book from Heaven, The Legend of the Dragon Boat Festival, The Legend of Sun Moon Lake and other famous myths and legends.
- Literary myths and legends: Nezha Conquers the Dragon King, Havoc in Heaven, Journey to the West, Investiture of the Gods, Splitting the Mountain to Save the Mother, The Precious Lotus Lantern and other famous myths and legends.

== Mythology and religion ==
Significant interplay exists between Chinese mythology and the philosophical traditions of Confucianism, Taoism, and Buddhism. Elements of pre-Han dynasty mythology such as those in Classic of Mountains and Seas were adapted into these belief systems as they developed (in the case of Taoism), or were assimilated into Chinese culture (in the case of Buddhism). Conversely, teachings and beliefs from Confucianism, Taoism, and Buddhism have, in turn, become integral components of Chinese mythology. For example, the Taoist belief of a spiritual paradise became incorporated into mythology as the place where immortals and deities dwell. Sometimes mythological and religious ideas have become widespread across China's many regions and diverse ethnic societies. In other cases, beliefs are more limited to certain social groups, for example, the veneration of white stones by the Qiang. One mythological theme that has a long history and many variations involves a shamanic world view, for example in the cases of Mongolian shamanism among the Mongols, Hmong shamanism among the Miao people, and the shamanic beliefs of the Qing dynasty from 1643 to 1912, derived from the Manchus. Politically, mythology was often used to legitimize the dynasties of China, with the founding house of a dynasty claiming a divine descent.

== Mythology and philosophy ==
Elaborations on the wuxing are not really part of mythology, although belief in five elements could appear. The Hundred Schools of Thought is a phrase suggesting the diversity of philosophical thought that developed during the Warring States of China. Then, and subsequently, philosophical movements had a complicated relationship with mythology. However, as far as they influence or are influenced by mythology, divides the philosophical camps into two rough halves, a Liberal group and a Conservative group. The liberal group being associated with the idea of individuality and change, for example as seen in the mythology of divination in China, such as the mythology of the dragon horse that delivered the eight bagua diagrams to Fu Xi, and methods of individual empowerment as seen in the Yi Jing (Book of Changes). The Liberal tendency is towards individual freedom, Daoism, and Nature. The relationship of the Conservative philosophies to mythology is seen in the legendary Nine Tripod Cauldrons, mythology about the emperors and central bureaucratic governance, Confucianism, written histories, ceremonial observances, subordination of the individual to the social groups of family and state, and a fixation on stability and enduring institutions. The distinction between the Liberal and Conservative is very general, but important in Chinese thought. Contradictions can be found in the details, however these are often traditional, such as the embrace by Confucius of the philosophical aspects of the Yi Jing, and the back-and-forth about the Mandate of Heaven wherein one dynasty ends and another begins based according to accounts (some of heavily mythological) where the Way of Heaven results in change, but then a new ethical stable dynasty becomes established. Examples of this include the stories of Yi Yin, Tang of Shang and Jie of Xia or the similar fantastic stories around Duke of Zhou and Di Xin.

== Mythology and ritual ==
Mythology exists in relationship with other aspects of society and culture, such as ritual. Various rituals are explained by mythology. For example, the ritual burning of mortuary banknotes (Hell Money), lighting fireworks, and so on.

=== Yubu ===
A good example of the relationship between Chinese mythology and ritual is the Yubu, also known as the Steps or Paces of Yu. During the course of his activities in controlling the Great Flood, Yu was supposed to have so fatigued himself that he lost all the hair from his legs and developed a serious limp. Daoist practitioners sometimes incorporate a curiously choreographed pedal locomotion into various rituals. Mythology and practice, one explains the other: in these rituals, the sacred time of Yu merges with the sacral practice of the present.

== Cosmology ==
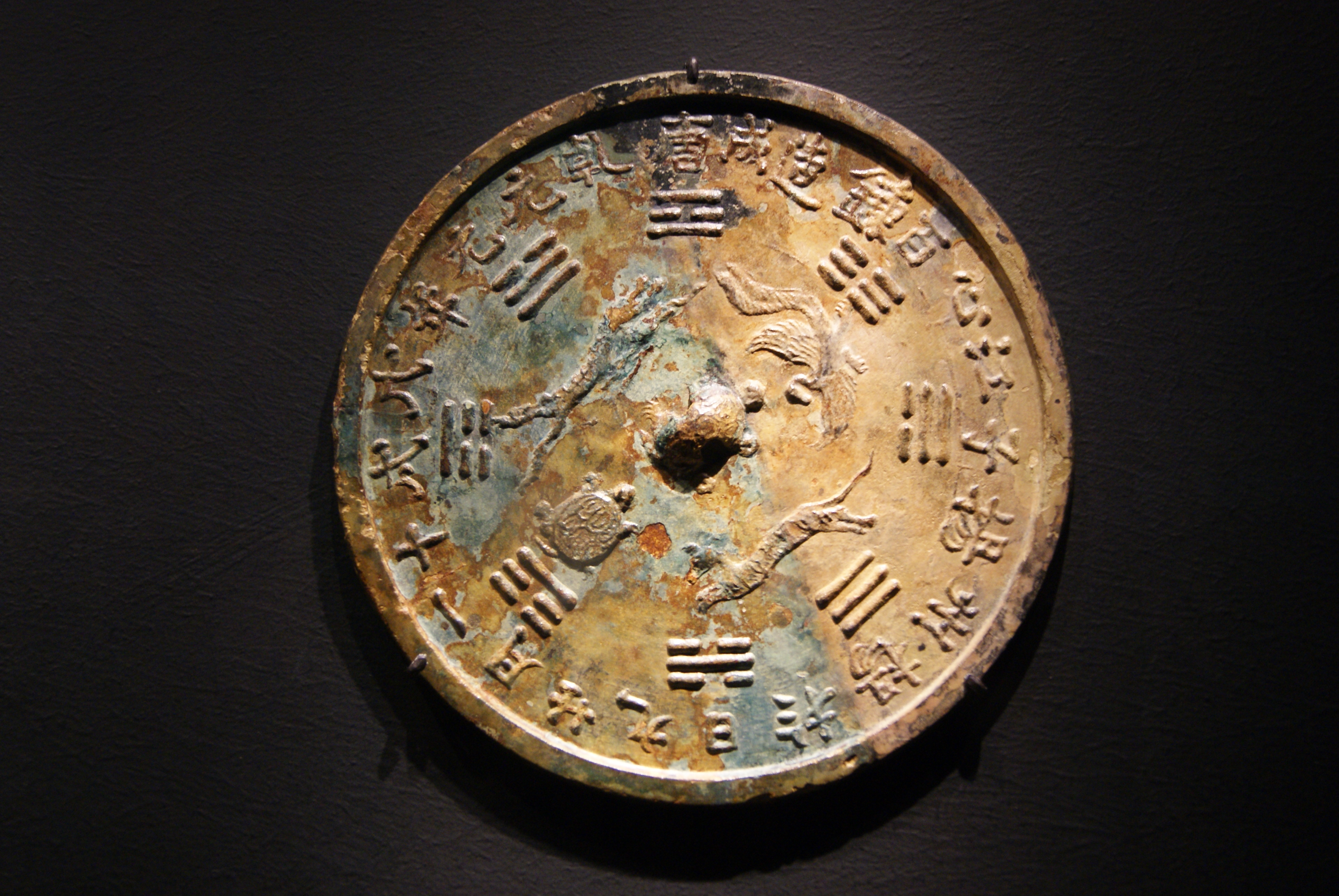
Bronze mirror with cosmological decoration from the Belitung shipwreck, including Bagua.

Various ideas about the nature of the earth, the universe, and their relationship to each other have historically existed as either a background or a focus of mythologies. One typical view is of a square earth separated from a round sky by sky pillars (mountains, trees, or undefined). Above the sky is the realm of Heaven, often viewed of as a vast area, with many inhabitants. Often the heavenly inhabitants are thought to be of an "as above so below" nature, their lives and social arrangements being parallel to those on earth, with a hierarchical government run by a supreme emperor, many palaces and lesser dwellings, a vast bureaucracy of many functions, clerks, guards, and servants. Below was a vast under ground land, also known as Diyu, Yellow Springs, Hell, and other terms. As time progressed, the idea of an underground land in which the souls of the departed were punished for their misdeeds during life became explicit, related to developments in Daoism and Buddhism. The underground world also came to be conceived of as inhabited by a vast bureaucracy, with kings, judges, torturers, conductors of souls, minor bureaucrats, recording secretaries, similar to the structure of society in the Middle Kingdom (earthly China).

=== Mythological places and concepts ===
The mythology of China includes a mythological geography describing individual mythological descriptions of places and the features; sometimes, this reaches to the level of a cosmological conception. Various features of mythological terrain are described in myth, including a Heavenly world above the earth, a land of the dead beneath the earth, palaces beneath the sea, and various fantastic areas or features of the earth, located beyond the limits of the known earth. Such mythological features include mountains, rivers, forests or fantastic trees, and caves or grottoes. These then serve as the location for the actions of various beings and creatures. One concept encountered in some myths is the idea of travel between Earth and Heaven by means of climbing up or down the pillars separating the two, there usually being four or Eight Pillars or an unspecified number of these Sky Ladders.

==== Directional ====
The Four Symbols of Chinese cosmology were the Azure Dragon of the East, the Black Tortoise of the North, the White Tiger of the West, and the Vermillion Bird of the South. These totem animals represented the four cardinal directions, with a lot of associated symbolism and beliefs. A fifth cardinal direction was also postulated: the center, represented by the emperor of China, located in the middle of his Middle Kingdom (Zhong Guo, or China). The real or mythological inhabitants making their dwellings at these cardinal points were numerous, as is associated mythology.

==== Heavenly realm ====
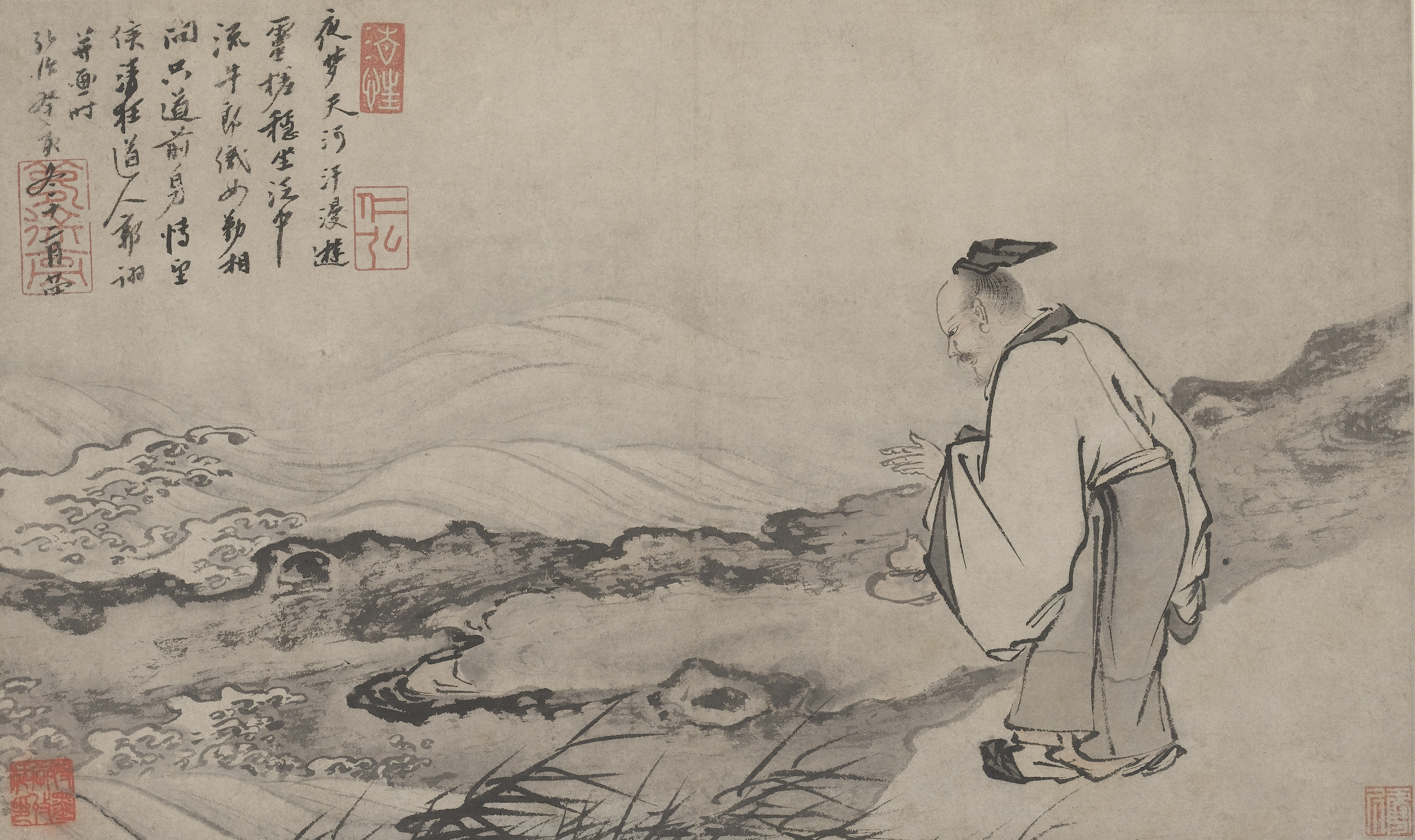
The creation of the River of Heaven (Milky Way) across the sky.

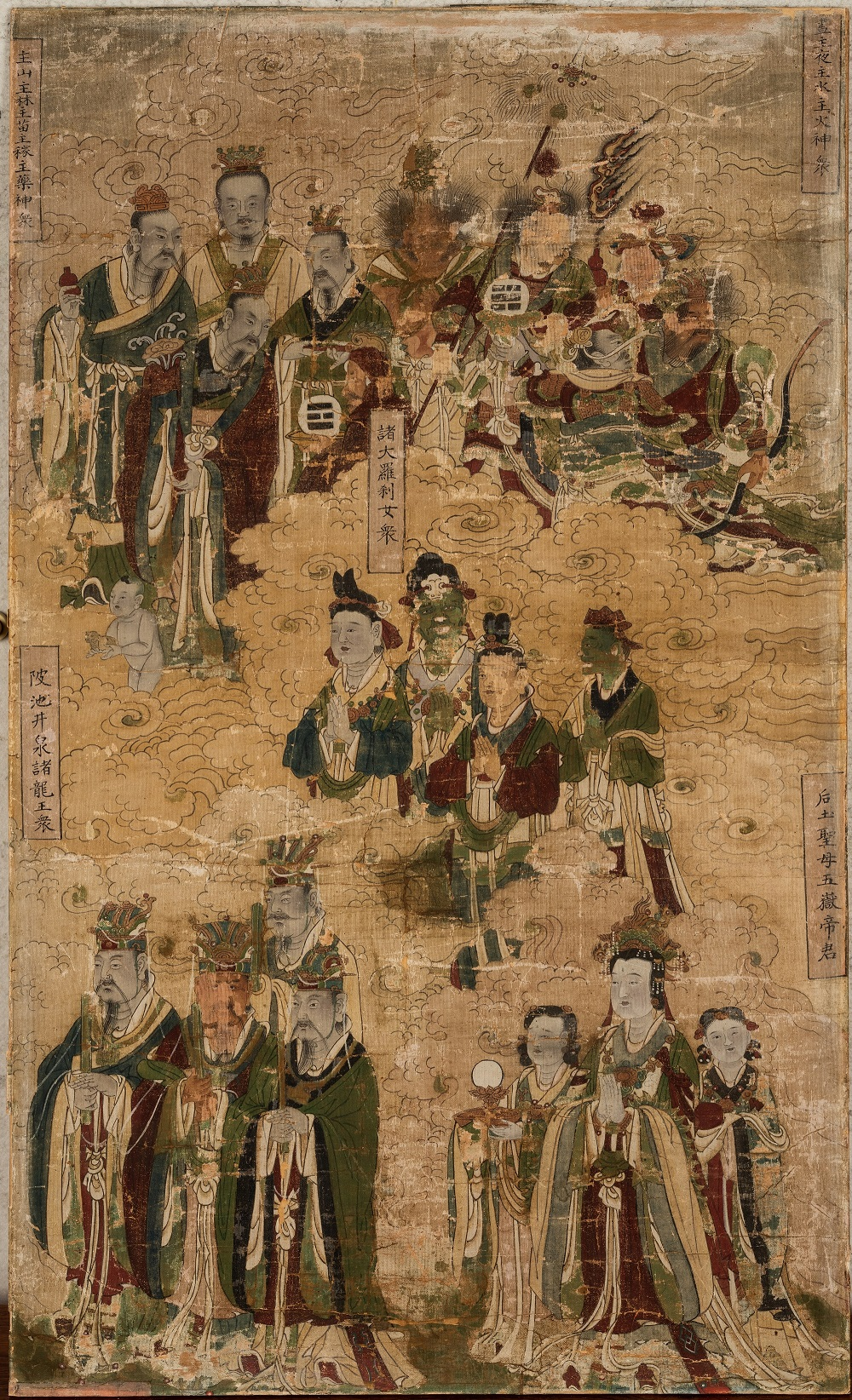
Ming dynasty Shuilu ritual painting of celestial deities

The Heavenly realm is described by the Chinese word "Tian," which can be translated into English as both "Heaven" and "sky." Sometimes this was personified into a deity (sky god). In some descriptions, this was an elaborate place ruled over by a supreme deity, or a group of supreme deities, Jade Emperor being associated with Daoism and Buddhas with Buddhism. Many astronomically observable features were subjects of mythology or the mythological locations and settings for mythic scenes. These include the sun, stars, moon, planets, Milky Way (sometimes referred to as the River of Heaven), clouds, and other features. These were often the home or destination of various deities, divinities, shamans, and many more. Another concept of the Heavenly realm is that of the Cords of the Sky. Travel between Heaven and Earth was usually described as achieved by flying or climbing. The Queqiao (鵲橋; Quèqiáo) was a bridge formed by birds flying across the Milky Way, as seen in The Cowherd and the Weaver Girl mythology surrounding the Qixi Festival. The hazy band of stars of the Milky Way was referred to as the "Silvery River" or the "River of Heaven".

==== Subterranean realm ====
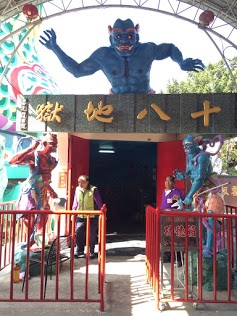
Tainan Madou Dai Tian Temple Eighteen Levels of Hell

According to mythology, beneath the Earth is another realm—an underground world generally said to be inhabited by the souls of dead humans and various supernatural beings (see hun and po). This hell is known by various names, including Diyu or the Yellow Springs. In more recent mythology, the underground inhabitation of the dead is generally described as somewhat similar to the land above: it possesses a hierarchical government bureaucracy, centered in the capital city of Youdu. The rulers of the underground realm are various kings, whose duties include parsing the souls of the dead according to the merits of their life on earth, and maintaining adequate records regarding that process. (An example of one such ruler is Yánluó wáng ("King Yanluo")). Souls are parsed and adjudicated for torturous punishment by balancing ones' crimes in life against any merits earned through good deeds. Various other functions within Diyu are performed by minor officials and minions, examples of whom are Ox-Head and Horse-Face, humanoid devils with animal features. In some versions of mythology or Chinese folk religion, souls are returned from Diyu and reincarnated after being given the Drink of Forgetfulness by Meng Po.

==== Earthly realm ====
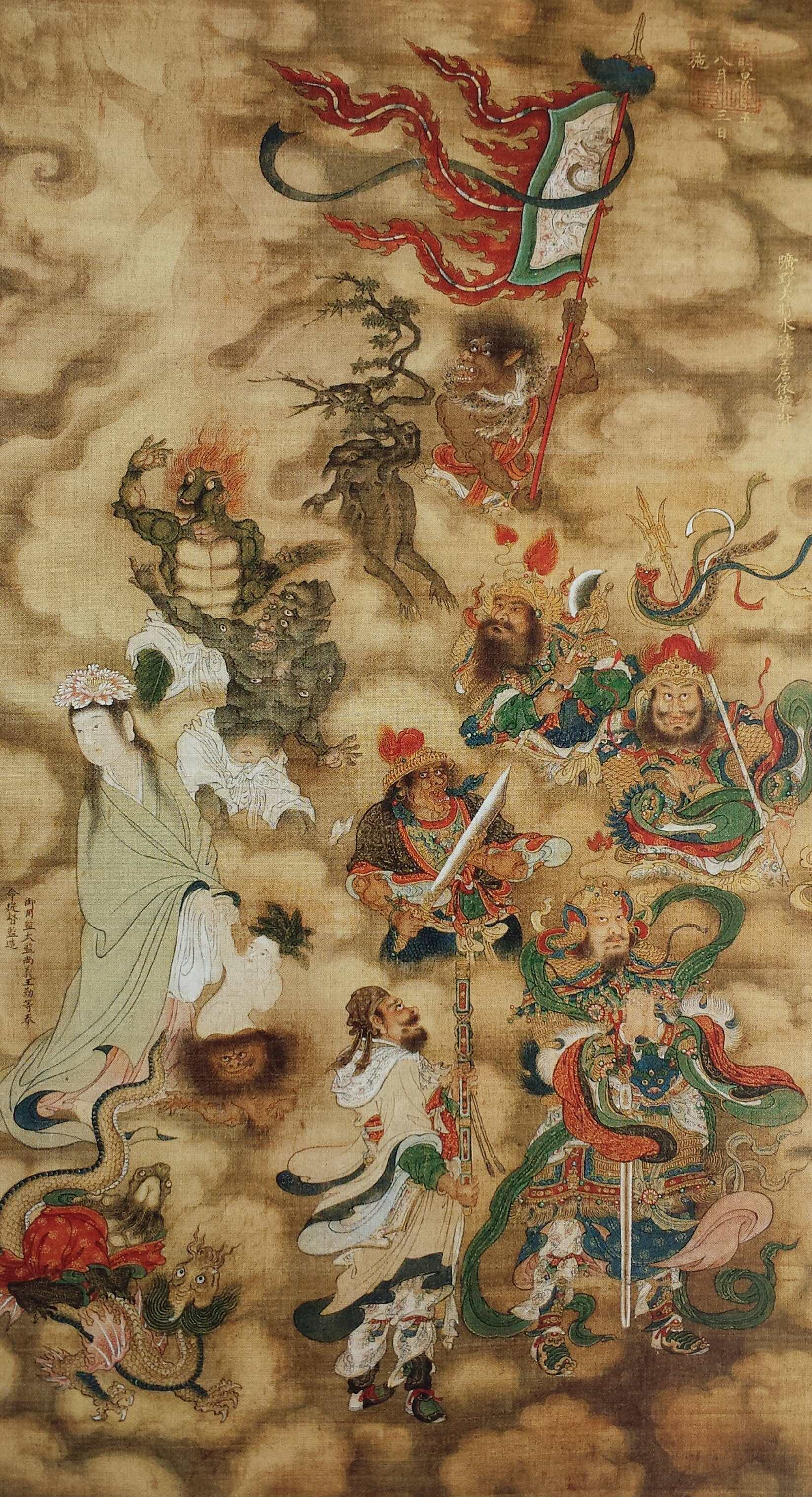
Ming dynasty Shuilu ritual painting of military and nature spirits.

Much mythology involves remote, exotic, or hard-to-get-to places. All sorts of mythological geography is said to exist at the extremes of the cardinal directions of earth. Much of the earthly terrain has been said to be inhabited by local spirits (sometimes called fairies or genii loci), especially mountains and bodies of water. There are Grotto Heavens, and also earthly paradises.

==== Seas, rivers, and islands ====
Various bodies of water appear in Chinese mythology. This includes oceans, rivers, streams, ponds. Often they are part of a mythological geography, and may have notable features, such as mythological islands, or other mythological features. There are mythological versions of all the major rivers that have existed in China in between ancient and modern China (most of these rivers are the same, but not all). Sometimes these rivers are said to originate from the Milky Way or Kunlun. Anyway, they are said to flow west to east because Gonggong wrecked the world pillar at Buzhou, tilting Earth and Heaven away from each other at that sector. Examples of these mythologized rivers include the Yangzi (including various stretches under different names), the Yellow River, the mythological Red River in the west, near Kunlun, and the Weak River, a mythological river in "the west", near "Kunlun", which flowed with a liquid too light in specific gravity for floating or swimming (but unbreathable). Examples of features along mythological rivers include the Dragon Gates (Longmen) which were rapid waterfalls where select carp can transform into dragons, by swimming upstream and leaping up over the falls. Examples of islands include Mount Penglai, a paradisaical isle in the sea, vaguely east of China but sometimes conflated with Japan.

==== Mountains and in-between places ====
Various other mythological locales include what are known as fairylands or paradises, pillars separating Earth and Sky, ruined or otherwise. The Earth has many extreme and exotic locales – they are separated by pillars between Earth and Heaven, supporting the sky, usually four or eight. Generally, Chinese mythology regarded people as living in the middle regions of the world and conceived the exotic earthly places to exist in the directional extremes to the north, east, south, or west. Eventually, the idea of an eastern and western paradise seems to have arisen. In the west, according to certain myths, there was Kunlun. On the eastern seacoast was Feather Mountain, the place of exile of Gun and other events during or just after the world flood. Further east was Fusang, a mythical tree, or else an island (sometimes interpreted as Japan). The geography of China, in which the land seems to be higher in the west and tilt down toward the east and with the rivers tending to flow west-to-east was explained by the damage Gonggong did to the world pillar Mount Buzhou, mountain pillars separating the sky from the world (China), which also displaced the Celestial Pole, so that the sky rotates off-center.

==== Kunlun ====
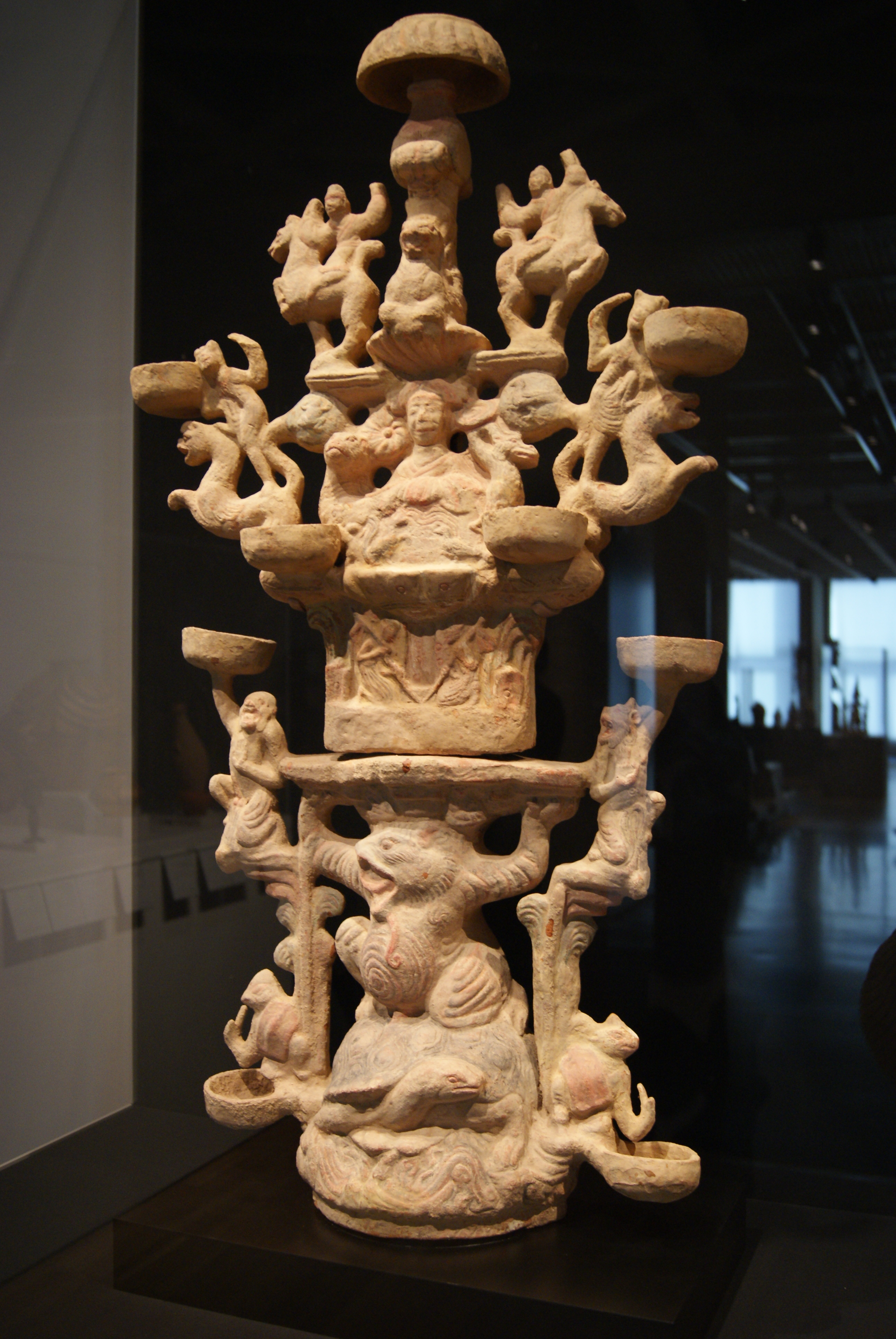
Lamp Representing the Realm of the Queen Mother of the West (1st–2nd century CE)

In the west was Kunlun, although it is also sometimes said to be towards the south seas. Kunlun was pictured as having a mountain or mountain range, Kunlun Mountain where dwelt various divinities, grew fabulous plants, home to exotic animals, and various deities and immortals (today there is a real mountain or range named Kunlun, as there has in the past, however the identity has shifted further west over time). The Qing Niao bird was a mythical bird, and messenger of Xi Wangmu to the rest of the world. Nearby to Kunlun, it was sometimes said or written and forming a sort of protective barrier to the western paradise or "fairyland" named Xuánpǔ (玄圃) where also was to be found the jade pool Yáochí (瑤池), eventually thought to exist on mount Kunlun (which itself was thought to possess cliffs insurmountable to normal mortals was the Moving Sands, a semi-mythological place also to the west of China (the real Taklamakan Desert to the west of or in China is known for its shifting sands). There were other locations of mythological geography around the area of Kunlun such as Jade Mountain and the various colored rivers which flew out of Kunlun. For example, the Red, or Scarlet River was supposed to flow to the south of Kunlun.

== Mythological and semi-mythological chronology ==
Mythological and semi-mythological chronology includes mythic representations of the creation of the world, population (and sometimes re-populations) by humans, sometimes floods, and various cultural developments, such as the development of ruling dynasties. Many myths and stories have been recounted about the early dynasties, however, more purely historical literature tends to begin with the Qin dynasty (for example, see Paladin 1998). On the other hand, accounts of the Shang, Xia, and early Zhou dynasties tend to mythologize. By a historical process of euhemerism many of these myths evolved over time into variant versions with an emphasis on moral parables and rationalization of some of the more fantastic ideas.

=== Mythology of time and calendar ===
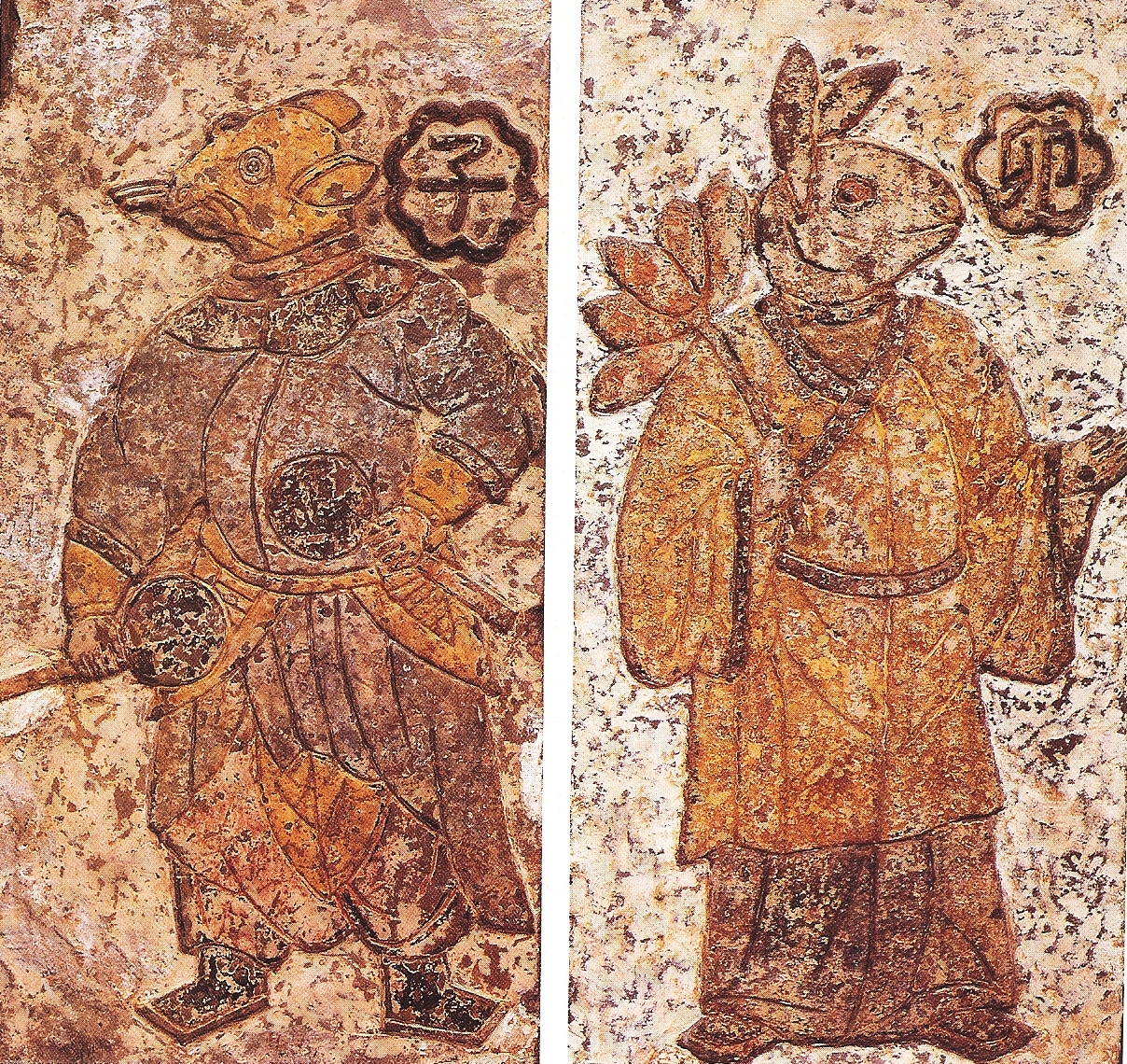
Zoomorphic guardian spirits of certain Hours. On the left is the guardian of midnight (from 11 pm to 1 am) and on the right is the guardian of morning (from 5 to 7 am). Han dynasty (202 BCE – 220 CE) Chinese paintings on ceramic tile

Mythology of time and the calendar includes the twelve zodiacal animals and various divine or spiritual genii regulating or appointed as guardians for years, days, or hours.

==== Twelve zodiacal animals ====
In China and surrounding areas, a calendrical system consisting of measuring time in cycles of twelve represented by twelve has an ancient historical past. The exact line-up of animals is sometimes slightly different, but the basic principle is that each animal takes a turn as the emblematic or totem animal for a year or other unit of time in a cycle of one dozen. This is explained by various myths.

The zodiacs in order are: Rat, Ox, Tiger, Rabbit, Dragon, Snake, Horse, Goat, Monkey, Rooster, Dog, and Pig

=== Correlation of mythological and real time ===
Some Chinese mythology becomes specific about chronological time, based on the ganzhi system, numbers of human generations, or other details suggesting synchronization between the mythological chronology and the ideas of modern historians. However, real correlation begins in the Year of the Metal Monkey, Zhou dynasty, 841 BC, a since validated claim by Sima Qian. However, although historians take note of this, subsequent mythology has not tended to reflect this quest for rational, historical timelining.

== Creation myths ==
Various ideas about the creation of the universe, the earth, the sky, various deities and creatures, and the origin of various clans or ethnic groups of humans have circulated in the area of China for millennia. These creation myths may include the origins of the universe and everything, the origins of humans, or the origins of specific groups, such as a Han Chinese in descent from Yandi and Huangdi (as 炎黃子孫, "Descendants of the Flame and Yellow Emperors"). Various myths contain explanations of various origins and the progress of cultural development.

=== Pangu ===
One common story involves Pangu. Among other sources, he was written about by Taoist author Xu Zheng c. 200 CE, as claimed to be the first sentient being and creator, "making the heavens and the earth".

== Age of heroes ==
Various culture heroes have been said to have helped or saved humanity in many ways, such as stopping floods, teaching the use of fire, and so on. As mythic chronology is inherently nonlinear, with time being telescopically expanded or contracted, there are various contradictions. The earliest culture heroes were sometimes considered deities and other times heroic humans, but often little distinction was made. Examples of early culture heroes include Youchao ("Have Nest") who taught people how to make wooden shelters) and Suiren ("Fire Maker") who taught people the use of fire and cooking thus saving them from much food-poisoning, in addition to developing cuisine. Another example of a mythological hero who provided beneficial knowledge to humanity involves sericulture, the production of silk: an invention credited to Leizu, for one. An example of a non-Han ethnicity culture hero is Panhu. Because of their self-identification as descendants from these original ancestors, Panhu has been worshiped by the Yao people and the She people, often as King Pan, and the eating of dog meat was tabooed. This ancestral myth has also been found among the Miao people and Li people. Some of the first culture heroes are the legendary emperors who succeeded the times of the part-human, part-serpent deities Nuwa and Fuxi; these emperors tend to be portrayed as more explicitly human, although Huangdi, the Yellow Emperor, is often portrayed as part-dragon during life.

=== Mythological emperors ===
==== Historicity ====
Some historicized versions of semi-historical and undeniably mythologized accounts of ancient times were used by those who have attempted to apply actual BCE dates to the mythological chronology. Traditional Chinese accounts of the early emperors chronologically locate the Yellow Emperor as having lived in the Northern Chinese plain around 2698 to 2599 BCE, about seventeen generations after the time of Shennong. A major difference between the possible historicity of material embedded in mythological accounts is that through the time of the last Flame Emperor (Yandi) information was recorded using knotted ropes, whereas the introduction of writing is associated with the reign of Huang Di (although the historical continuity of written tradition beginning at that time is a matter of discussion by experts). The most prominent of the first emperors include, in chronological order, Huangdi, Gaoyang (Zhuanxu), Gaoxin (Di Ku), Yao, and Shun. These emperors were said to be morally upright and benevolent, and examples to be emulated by latter-day kings and emperors. Sometimes approximate calculations of times have been made based on the claimed number of generations from one significant mythological figure to the next, as in the case of the legendary founder of the Ji family, Hou Ji, whose descendants would rule generations after his mythological appearance as the historical Zhou dynasty, beginning around 1046 BCE. Despite various assignments of dates to the accounts of these Emperors, fantastic claims about the length of their reigns are common. The average reign-lengths that these numbers imply are improbable, and there is a lack of consensus regarding these dates by modern historians. Their historical use may be limited to establishing a relative chronology.

=== Houji ===
Houji was a cultural hero, of the agricultural type.

=== Chiyou ===
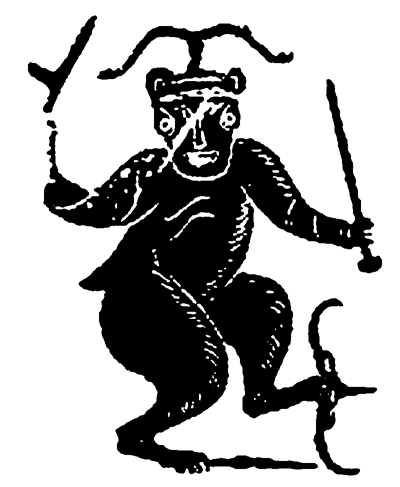
Chiyou

Chiyou (also known as Ch'ih Yu) was a metallurgical engineer, specializing in weaponry.

=== Three Primeval Emperors, Five Premier Emperors, and Three Dynasties ===
The mythological history of people (or at least the Han Chinese people) begins with two groups, one of three and one of five. The numbers are symbolically significant, however, the actual membership of the two groups is not explicated. There are different lists. The older group is the Three Primeval Emperors, who were followed by the Five Premier Emperors. After that came the Three Dynasties: these were the Xia dynasty, Shang dynasty, and the Zhou dynasty. These three are all historically attested to, but separating the myth from the history is not always clear; nevertheless, there is a lot of mythology around the Three Primeval Emperors, Five Premier Emperors, and Three Dynasties. An age of Three Primeval Emperors followed by the age of the Five Premier Emperors (Sānhuáng-Wǔdì) contrasts with the subsequent treatment of chronology by dynasties, up to recent times. Since the time the Qin emperor titled himself huangdi by combining two previous titles into one, huangdi was the title for Chinese emperors for ages.

==== Three Primeval Emperors ====
===== Title =====
The title of the Three Primeval Emperors is huang, in Chinese. The original connotation of this title is unknown, and it is variously translated into English. Translations include "Sovereign", "Emperor", and "August".

===== Names =====
The names of the Three Primeval Emperors include Youchao ("Have Nest"), Suiren ("Fire Maker"), Paoxi/Fuxi ("Animal Domesticator"), and Shennong ("Divine Husbandman"). Sometimes Huangdi is included.

==== Five Premier Emperors ====
===== Title =====
The title of the Five Premier Emperors is di, in Chinese. The original connotation of this title is unknown, or how it compares or contrasts with the term huang, and it is variously translated into English. Translations include "Sovereign", "Emperor", and "Lord".

===== Names =====
Names of the Five Premier Emperors include Huangdi, Shaohao, Zhuanxu, Di Ku, Yao, and Shun.

=== Nuwa and Fuxi ===
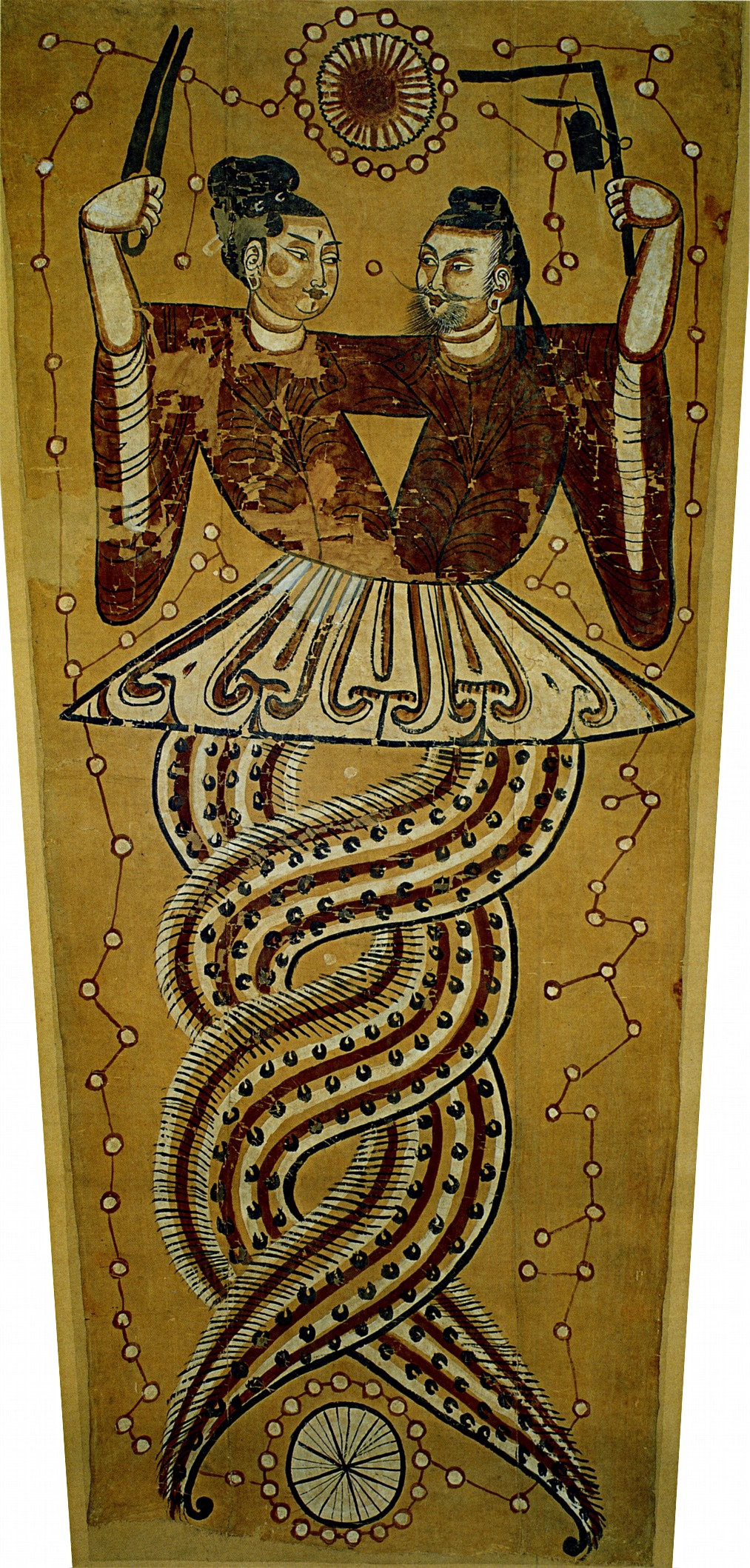
Nüwa and Fuxi represented as half-snake, half-human creatures.

Nuwa and Fuxi (also known as Paoxi) are sometimes worshiped as the ultimate ancestor of all humankind and are often represented as half-snake, half-humans. Nuwa's companion, Fuxi, was her brother and husband.

==== Nuwa saves the world ====
After Gong-Gong was said to have damaged the world pillar holding the earth and sky apart, the sky was rent, causing fires, floods, and other devastating events. The disasters were only remedied when Nüwa repaired the sky with five colored stones. The figure of Nüwa, also referred to as Nü Kwa, appeared in literature no earlier than c. 350 BCE. It is sometimes believed that Nüwa molded humans from clay to populate or re-populate the world, thus creating modern humans.

==== Fuxi and the Yellow River map ====
The production of the Yellow River Map is associated mythologically with Fuxi but is also sometimes placed in subsequent eras.

=== Shennong and Yan Emperor(s) ===
Shennong is variously translated as "Divine Farmer" or "Divine Peasant", or "Agriculture God", and also known as the Wugushen (Spirit of the Five Grains) and Wuguxiandi "First Deity of the Five Grains". Shennong is a mythological Chinese deity in Chinese folk religion and venerated as a mythical sage ruler of prehistoric China. Shennong's descendants began to style themselves as Yan Emperor (Yandi), or Flame Emperor. Yandi is often considered an important mythological emperor, although Yandi is sometimes considered as series of emperors bearing the same title, the "Yan Emperor(s)" or "Flame Emperor(s)". Yan literally means "flame", implying that Yan Emperor's people possibly uphold a symbol of fire as their tribal totems. K. C. Wu speculates that this appellation may be connected with the use of fire to clear the fields in slash and burn agriculture. And, Yandi is also a Red Emperor.

=== Yellow Emperor and Leizu ===
One of the more important figures in Chinese mythology is the Yellow Emperor, or Huang Di. His original name was Yellow Soil or Huangdi where di was the Chinese word for soil or ground. He was named after the Yellow Soil in the Yellow River Basin area where Chinese civilization was thought to have originated. Future generations later changed it to di or emperor in order to give Huangdi a more sovereign-sounding name. He also appears as Xuanyuan. Huang Di is also referred to as one of the Five August ones, and one of the few consistent members of the list. There were also other colored emperors, such as Black, Green, Red, and White. According to some mythology, Huang Di was the son of Shaodian, who was the half-brother of Yan Di. Huang Di's mother was said to be Fubao. Huang Di's wife Leizu is supposed to have invented sericulture. In some versions Cangjie invented writing during the reign of Huang Di. The Yellow Emperor is said to have fought a great battle against Chiyou. Huangdi had various wives and many descendants, including Shaohao (leader of the Dongyi).

=== Di Ku ===
Ku, Di Ku, Ti K'u, or Diku, is also known as Kao Hsin or Gāoxīn. Diku is an important mythological figure, as signified by his title Di (帝), basically signifying possession of some sort of imperial divinity, as in the sense of the Roman title wikt:divus; something sometimes translated as "emperor". Diku is sometimes considered to descend from Huangdi and to be ancestral to the ruling family of the Shang dynasty of the second millennium BCE. Diku is credited with the invention of various musical instruments along with musical pieces for them to accompany. Diku is said to have consorted with the semi-divine females Jiang Yuan and Jiandi.

=== Yao and Shun ===
Yao and Shun were important mythological rulers, exemplars of propriety in rulership. The Great Flood began during the reign of Yao and continued through the time of Shun (the successor of Yao, who had passed over his own son and made Shun his successor because of Shun's ability and morality). Historically, when Qin Shi Huang united China in 221 BCE, he used propaganda to acclaim his achievements as surpassing those of mythological rulers who had gone before him. He combined the ancient titles of Huáng (皇) and Dì (帝) to create a new title, Huángdì (皇帝); thus, the Qin emperor used mythology to bolster his claims to be the legitimate and absolute ruler of the whole earth. This reflected what was to become a longstanding belief that all civilized people should have one government, and that it should be Chinese.

=== Gun, Yu, and the Great Flood ===
Shun passed on his place as emperor to Yu the Great. The Yellow River, prone to flooding, erupted in a huge flood in the time of Yao. The flood disrupted society and endangered human existence, as agricultural fields drowned, hunting game disappeared, and the people were dislocated to hills and mountains. Yu's father, Gun, was put in charge of flood control by Yao, but failed to alleviate the problem after nine years. In some versions Gun was executed by Shun's minister Zhurong for this failure, but according to others Gun was merely exiled for opposing the elevation of Shun as co-emperor. In more purely mythological versions, the story is more along the lines that Gun transformed into an animal shape to escape the wrath of Heaven (for having dared to go to Heaven and steal the flood-fighting expanding earth xirang). He fled to Feather Mountain and was struck dead by the fire god Zhurong on behalf of Heaven. After three years, his son Yu appeared out of his belly, usually said to be in the form of some fantastic animal. Yu took his father's place fighting the flood, leading the people to build canals and levees, often said to be with the help of Xirang. After thirteen years of toil, Yu abated the flood. Why the Xirang failed to work when Gun used it and he was punished by Heaven, but when Yu used it he was able to stop the flood and was rewarded by Heaven, is a question frequently made in the myths. The mythology of Yu and his associates during their work in controlling the flood and simultaneously saving the people can be seen in various ways to symbolize different societal and cultural developments, such as innovations in hunting, agriculture, well-digging, astronomy, social and political organizing, and other cultural innovations that occur during the course of the mythology around the flood stories. For example, a historicized version of xirang explains this soil may represent an innovative type of raised garden, made up of soil, brushwood, and similar materials. Thus, Yu and his work in controlling the flood with xirang would symbolize a societal development allowing a large scale approach to transforming wetlands into arable fields. Yu was said to be the founder of the Xia dynasty.

=== First dynasties ===
The first three dynasties have especial significance in mythology.

==== Xia dynasty ====
The Xia dynasty is the first dynasty in traditional Chinese historiography as known through literary accounts. However, many of these accounts contain elements of a clearly semi-mythological, and in some versions completely mythological or fanciful. The founding mythology of the early dynasties tends to have certain common general features, including the divine assistance obtained in the founding and the reasons for it. The fighter of the Great Flood, Yu "the Great" had served Yao and Shun and they enfeoffed him as the Prince of Xia, an area of land. Upon Yu's death questions arose regarding the method of imperial succession, which would be a key factor as an example for Chinese culture for millennia. The question was who would succeed Yu upon his death. It could be his son, Qi of Xia, also known as Kai, or the deputy that competently and diligently helped in the work against the great flood, a mighty hunter who helped feed the people during a time when agriculture had been rendered impossible, Bo Yi. The mythological variants are much concerned with the relative merits between the two. Qi's succession broke the previous convention of meritorious succession in favor of hereditary succession, thus initiating a dynastic tradition. The new dynasty was called "Xia" after Yu's centre of power.

==== Shang dynasty ====
The Shang dynasty is the earliest dynasty of traditional Chinese history firmly supported by archaeological evidence. Yet, as in common with the founding of Xia, there is mythological material regarding how the previous dynasty turned to evil and unworthy ways, and the founder (of miraculous birth or ancestry) overthrew it. The mythology of the Shang dynasty is distinct from philosophical and historical accounts. Significant mythology includes the origin of its founders, the miraculous birth by Jiandi of Shang founder Qi, also known as Xie of Shang, after she became pregnant upon swallowing or holding in her bosom a bird's egg. After several generations, Xie (or Qi)'s descendant Tang became king of Shang by overthrowing Jie, the last king of the Xia dynasty, said to be a very drunken and bloodthirsty tyrant. The fifth book of the philosopher Mozi describes the end of the Xia dynasty and the beginning of the Shang:

During the reign of King Jie of Xia, there was a great climatic change. Legends hold that the paths of the sun and moon changed, the seasons became confused, and the five grains dried up. Ghouls cried in the country and cranes shrieked for ten nights. Heaven ordered Shang Tang to receive the heavenly commission from the Xia dynasty, which had failed morally and which Heaven was determined to end. Shang Tang was commanded to destroy Xia with the promise of Heaven's help. In the dark, Heaven destroyed the fortress' pool, and Shang Tang then gained victory easily (非攻下 Condemnation of Offensive War III, by Mozi).

After discussing the end of Xia and the beginning of Shang, Mozi describes the end of Shang and the beginning of the succeeding Zhou dynasty:

During the reign of Di Xin, Heaven could not endure his morality and neglect of timely sacrifices. It rained mud for ten days and nights, the nine cauldrons shifted positions, supernatural prodigies appeared, and ghosts cried at night. There were women who became men while it rained flesh and thorny brambles, covering the national highways. A red bird brought a message: "Heaven decrees King Wen of Zhou to punish Yin and possess its empire". The Yellow River formed charts and the earth brought forth mythical horses. When King Wu became king, three gods appeared to him in a dream, telling him that they had drowned Di Xin in wine and that King Wu was to attack him. On the way back from victory, the heavens gave him the emblem of a yellow bird.

The mythological events surrounding the end of the Shang dynasty and the establishment of the Zhou greatly influenced the subject and story told in the popular novel Investiture of the Gods.

==== Founding of the Zhōu dynasty ====
The origins of the Ji dynastic founding family of the Zhōu dynasty is replete with mythological material, going back to its legendary founder Houji (who was originally named Qi, but a different Qi than the Shang founder known as Xie or Qi). Myths about Houji include those of his mythical origins, of which there are two main myths. The end of the Shang overlaps the rise of the Zhōu, so there is shared material. Once established, the Zhōu were characterized by their volume of literature, in the beginning much of it justifying their overthrow of the Shang. However, it was not long before much historical material appeared, of a rational, rationalized, philosophical, or otherwise non-mythological nature.

===== Bagua =====
One of the main legacies of the rise of Zhou was the dissemination of the classic book I Ching, however the eight trigrams must be from a far earlier period than Wengong, and even more than the editing and commentary by Confucius – mythology references the culture hero sometimes named Fuxi.

=== Subsequent dynasties ===
Dynasties succeeding Zhou had notable mythological material, such as the accumulation of legend around the Jian'an transition between Han dynasty and the Three Kingdoms contention, reflected in the Romance of the Three Kingdoms. From the Tang dynasty on, legends occur around the monk Xuanzang's quest for Buddhist scriptures (sutras) from the area more-or-less corresponding to modern India, which influenced the Ming dynasty novel Journey to the West.

== Important deities, spirits, and mythological people ==
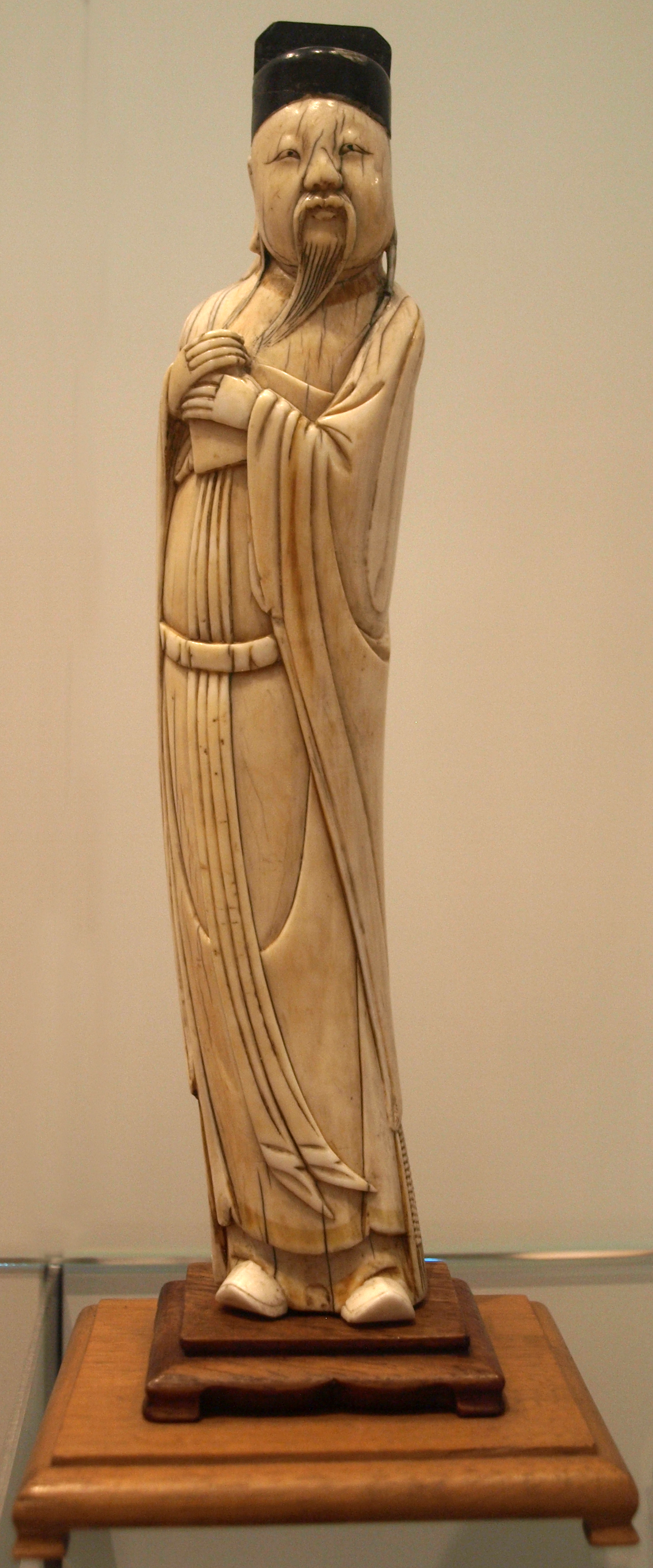
Wenchang Wang, Chinese God of literature, carved in ivory, c. 1550–1644, Ming dynasty.

There are various important deities, spirits, and mythological people in Chinese mythology and folk religion. Some are clearly divine, such as the Jade Emperor (and even he is sometimes said to have begun life as a mortal). However, in Chinese language many beings are referred to as shen. (Sometimes Chinese mythology is called 中國神話 – Mandarin Chinese: Zhōngguó Shénhuà). Due to the ambiguity of this word when translated into English, it is not always clear how to classify in English the entities described as shen. The category shen is rather comprehensive and generic in Chinese myth and religion, shen may be spirits, goddesses or gods, ghosts, or other. Another important concept is the classification of immortals (xian). Immortals are more a category of quality than a description of an actual type. Immortals are defined by living for a long time (maybe forever). However, this is not a static quality, since Daoist adepts, shamans, or others are said to become immortals through right effort and various practices. Another example is the immortality sometimes obtained by the lohans, Bodhisattvas, and Buddhas of Buddhist religion and mythology (this contrasts with indefinitely prolonged series of unenlightened re-births). Chinese mythology often tends to not make a clear differentiation between Buddhist and Daoist types. Various deities, spirits, and immortals (xian) are encountered in various myths. Some of these are particularly associated with Daoism. Some immortals or others became incorporated into Daoism as it developed as a phenomenon, deriving from ancient shamanic cults or other sources. The line between Daoism and folk religion is not clear. Other mythological beings are clearly derived through the process of the introduction of Buddhism into China.

=== Major deities ===
The concept of a principal or presiding deity has fluctuated over time in Chinese mythology.

==== Shangdi ====
Shangdi, also sometimes Huángtiān Dàdì (皇天大帝), appeared as early as the Shang dynasty. In later eras, he was more commonly referred to as Huángtiān Shàngdì (皇天上帝). The use of Huángtiān Dàdì refers to the Jade Emperor and Tian.

==== Jade Emperor ====
Chinese mythology holds that the Jade Emperor was charged with running of the three realms: heaven, hell, and the realm of the living. The Jade Emperor adjudicated and meted out rewards and remedies to saints, the living, and the deceased according to a merit system loosely called the Jade Principles Golden Script (玉律金篇, Yù lǜ jīn piān). When proposed judgments were objected to, usually by other saints, the administration would occasionally resort to the counsels of advisory elders. The Jade Emperor appeared in literature after the establishment of Taoism in China; his appearance as Yu Huang dates back to beyond the times of Yellow Emperor, Nüwa, or Fuxi.

==== Tian ====
Tian can be either a sky deity by that name or Heaven – the Sky itself. Tian appeared in literature c. 700 BCE, possibly earlier as dating depends on the date of the Shujing (Book of Documents). There are no creation-oriented narratives for Tian. The qualities of Tian and Shangdi appear to have merged in later literature and are now worshiped as one entity ("皇天上帝", Huángtiān Shàngdì) in, for example, the Beijing's Temple of Heaven. The extent of the distinction between Tian and Shangdi is debated. The sinologist Herrlee Creel claims that an analysis of the Shang oracle bones reveals Shangdi to have preceded Tian as a deity, and that Zhou dynasty authors replaced the term "Shangdi" with "Tian" to cement the claims of their influence.

==== Nüwa ====
Nüwa (or Nügua) is considered a mother goddess of Chinese mythology. She was involved in the creation of humanity and repairing the Pillars of Heaven. Nüwa is often depicted as half snake, half human, and is sometimes considered one of the Three Sovereigns, along with her brother and husband Fuxi.

==== Fuxi ====
Fuxi is the first of the Three Sovereigns. He created humanity alongside his sister and wife Nüwa, and like her, is depicted as half snake, half human. Fuxi is closely associated with the I Ching.

=== Daoism and Chinese mythology ===
Over time certain aspects of folk religion and belief coalesced and were refined into a group of formal religious beliefs, practices, and philosophy known as Daoism. One of the founders of Daoism was Old Man Laozi, who himself entered into legend or mythology. There is much overlap between religion and mythology, and between Chinese folk religion and Daoism. However, certain beings or concepts of Chinese mythology have a particularly strong association with religious or philosophical Daoism. For example, the Jade Emperor, Yùhuáng, is a major actor in many myths. In Daoist-related mythology there is often a strong presence of sorcery and magic, such as spells, charms, magical abilities, and elixirs. The development of Daoism as it came to be called was a lengthy one, with various strands including both rationalist ethical philosophy and a magico-religious stand informed by mythology. As Daoism developed as a concept from its traditional roots in Chinese folk religion and mythology, its legitimacy was bolstered by claims of originating with Huangdi, the Yellow Emperor. For example some of the Huangdi Sijing material, the Huangdi Yinfujing, and the Huangdi Neijing are Daoist classics with claims to a scriptural legacy going back to Huangdi.

=== Buddhist influences ===
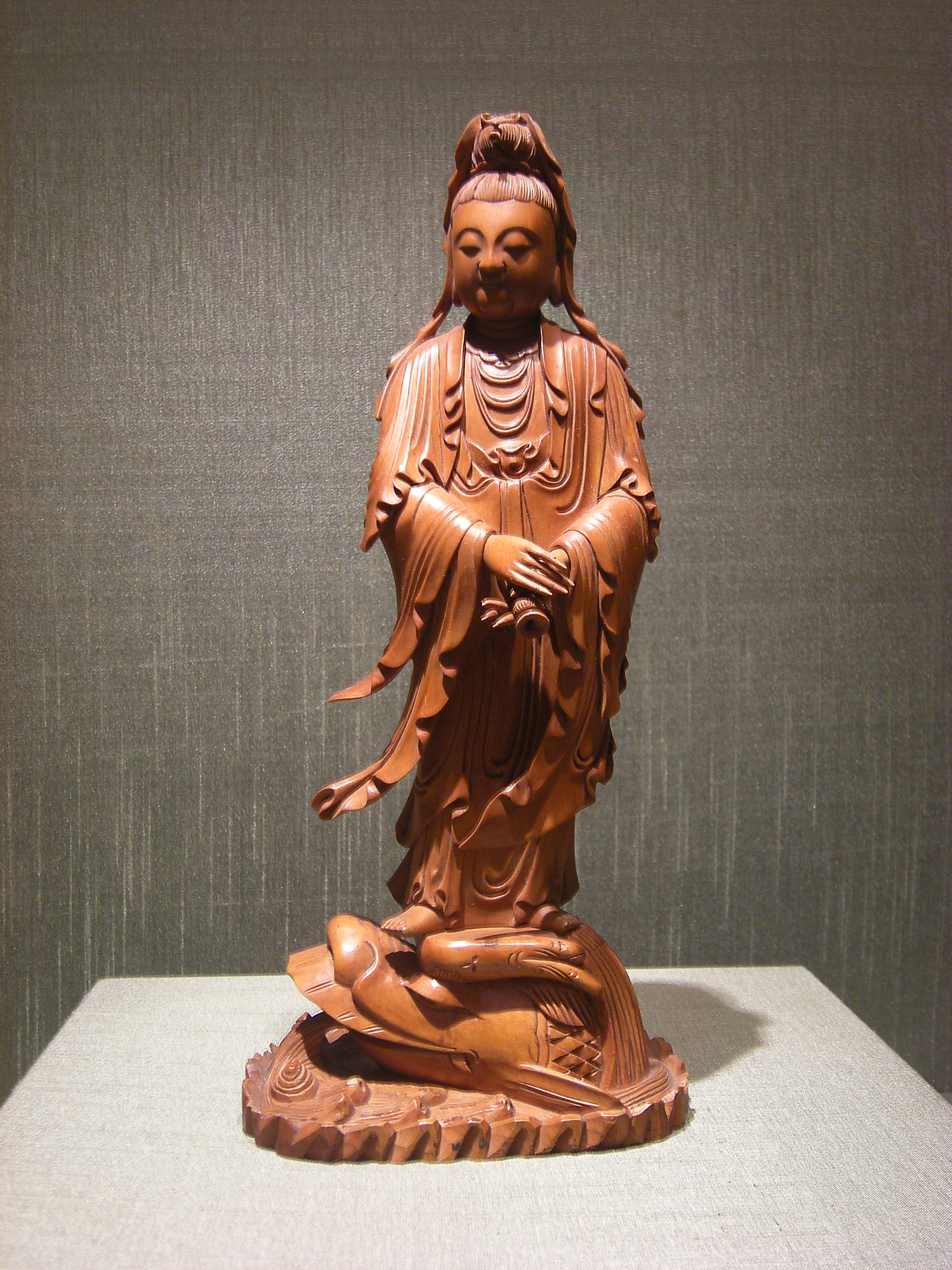
Boxwood statue of Avalokiteshvara (Guan-Yin)

Buddhism was historically introduced to China, probably in the first century CE, accompanied by the import of various ideas about deities and supernatural beings including Kṣitigarbha who was renamed Dizang. the Four Heavenly Kings, the main Buddha himself Shakyamuni Buddha (釋迦牟尼佛, Shìjiāmóunífó), Avalokiteśvara who after a few centuries metamorphosized into Guanyin (also Kuanyin) a bodhisattva of compassion, and Hotei the Laughing Buddha. New Buddhist material continued to enter China, with a big spike in the Tang dynasty, when the monk Xuanzang brought over 600 texts from India. Over time, Guanyin also became a Daoist immortal and was the subject of much mythology.

==== Guanyin ====
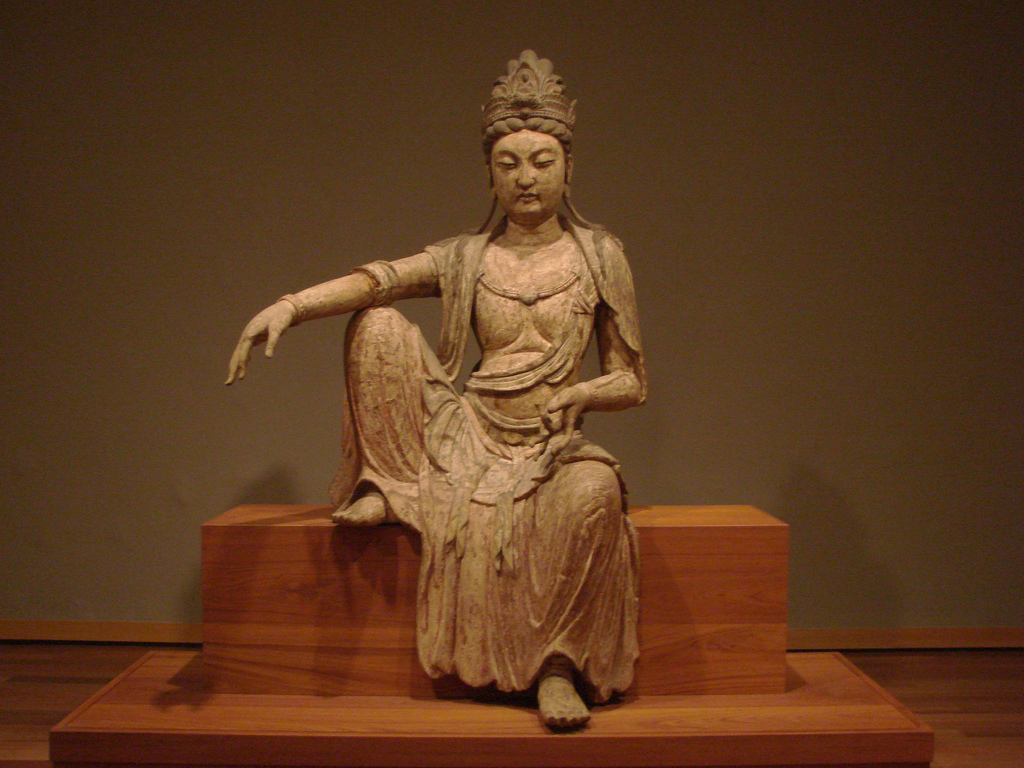
Song wood Guanyin

Guanyin is also known as Kwan Yin, Guanshiyin, the Goddess of Mercy and many other names. The mythology around Guanyin is two-fold, one based on the Avalokitasvara/Avalokiteśvara tradition from India and one based on an alleged Chinese young woman's life, as appears in the legend of Miaoshan. Guanyin is worshiped as a goddess, yet has a most impressive mythological résumé. Many myths and legends exist about Guan Yin. In all of them she is exceptionally compassionate.

==== Kṣitigarbha ====
Kṣitigarbha was a Buddhist deity from the area of India who was renamed Dizang, In China. He usually appears as a monk with a halo around his shaved head, he carries a staff to force open the gates of hell and a wish-fulfilling jewel to light up the darkness.

==== Four Heavenly Kings ====
There are a group known as the Four Heavenly Kings, one for each cardinal direction. Statues of them can be encountered in the Hall of the Heavenly Kings of many Buddhist temples.

==== Laughing Buddha ====
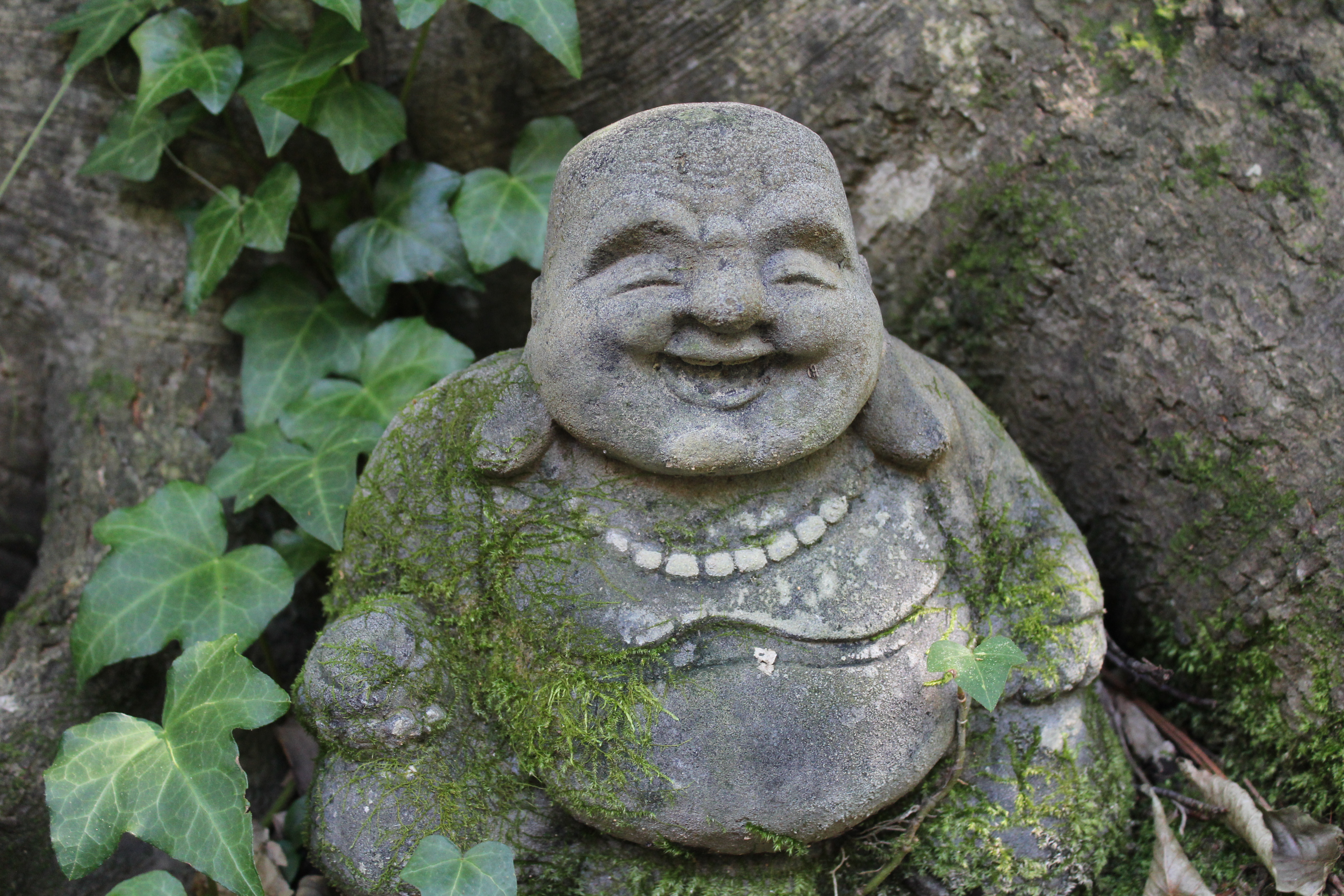
Laughing Buddha statue

The depiction of a fat, laughing Buddha developed in China.

=== Confucian influence ===
A major factor in Chinese mythology is shown in the development of the tradition known as Confucianism, named after a writer and school master who lived around 551–479 BCE. Confucius embraced the traditions of ancestor veneration. He came to be a major figure of worship in Daoism, which had its genesis in traditional Chinese religion. The legitimacy of the Confucian movement was bolstered by the claim that its origins could be found in the mythology (often claimed to be history) of Yao and Shun.

=== Sharing between folk religion and mythology ===
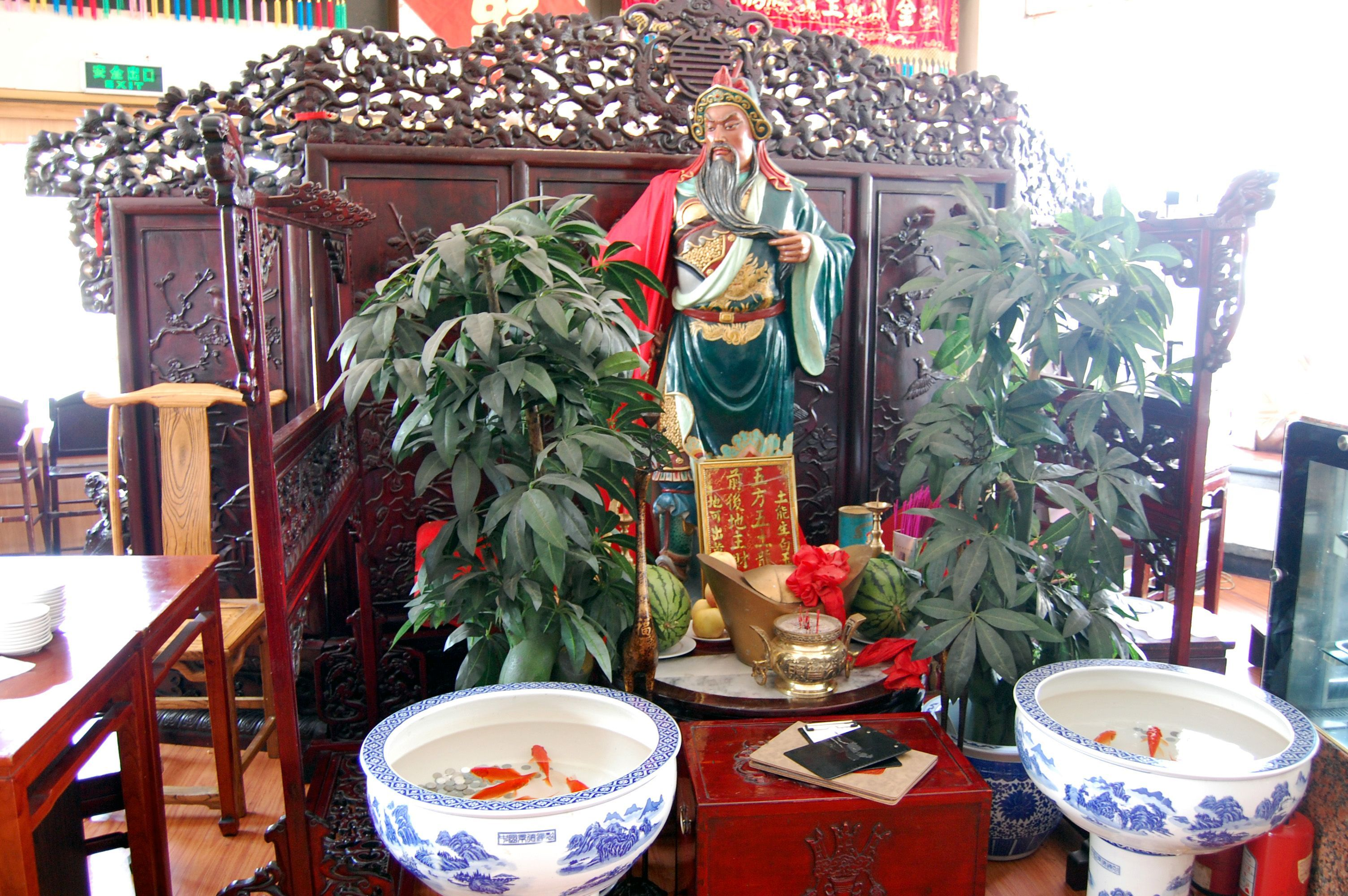
Altar to Guandi in a restaurant of Beijing

Modern and ancient Chinese culture had plenty of room for both religion and mythology. Certain deities or spirits receive special attention. These include divinities of wealth, longevity, fertility. Mythologically, it is possible to attain many desires through ritual activity involved with mythological themes. For example, many stores and restaurants in China or of the Chinese diaspora have shrines to Guan Yu, also known as Guandi.

==== Guandi ====
Guandi began as a Three Kingdoms general, Guan Yu. Over the subsequent centuries, Guan Yu became promoted by official decree to be the god Guandi. He is a god primarily of brotherhood and social organizations such as businesses, although this is sometimes seen in connection with martial power and war. According to mythology, Guan Yu made a famous covenant of brotherhood in a peach orchard.

==== Three Star deities ====
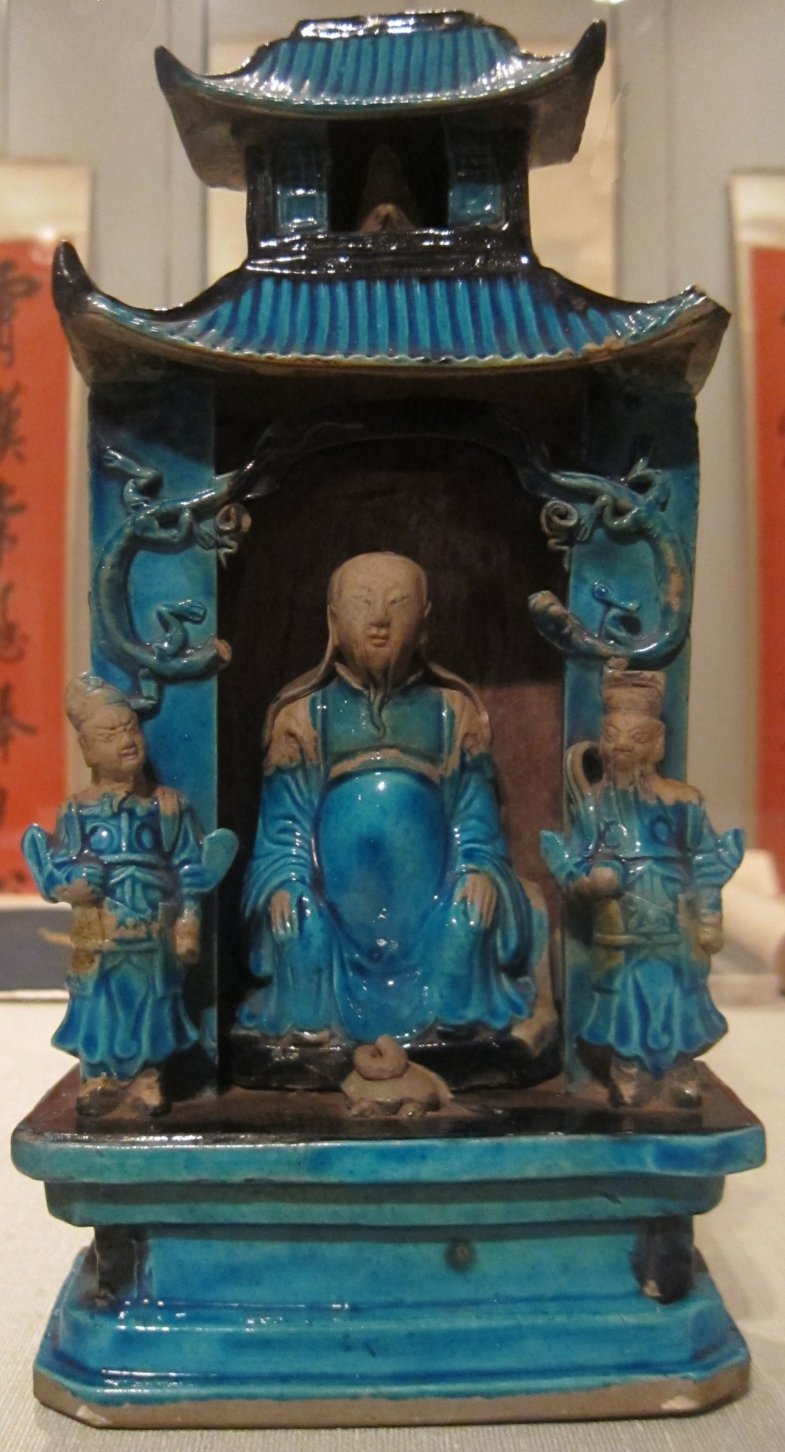
The Star God of Longevity, China, Ming dynasty, 16th century, glazed stoneware

===== Star God of Longevity =====
An example of Sharing between folk religion and mythology is the Star God of Longevity.

=== Afterlife and family ===
Much Chinese mythology concerns the afterlife, explaining what happens to people after they die. This is related to ancestor veneration, the mythological geography of heaven and hell, the rituals at family tombs, and so on.

==== Immortals (xiān) ====
Sometimes, in mythology, certain humans develop the ability to live indefinitely, avoiding death, and becoming divine xiān. Such humans generally also are said to develop special powers. Generally, these abilities are said to develop through such practices of Chinese alchemy, obtaining an Elixir of life, and/or various austerities of diet or sexuality. Symbolic associations with immortality include a spotted deer, cranes, the Lingzhi mushroom, and a gourd and bat. often Immortals are mythologically located in Mountain Paradises, such as Kunlun. Various common English translations of xiān exist, such as Immortal, Fairy, and Sage. An example of a Daoist immortal is Wong Tai Sin, who began as a fourth century CE hermit and developed into a divine healer.

===== Magu =====
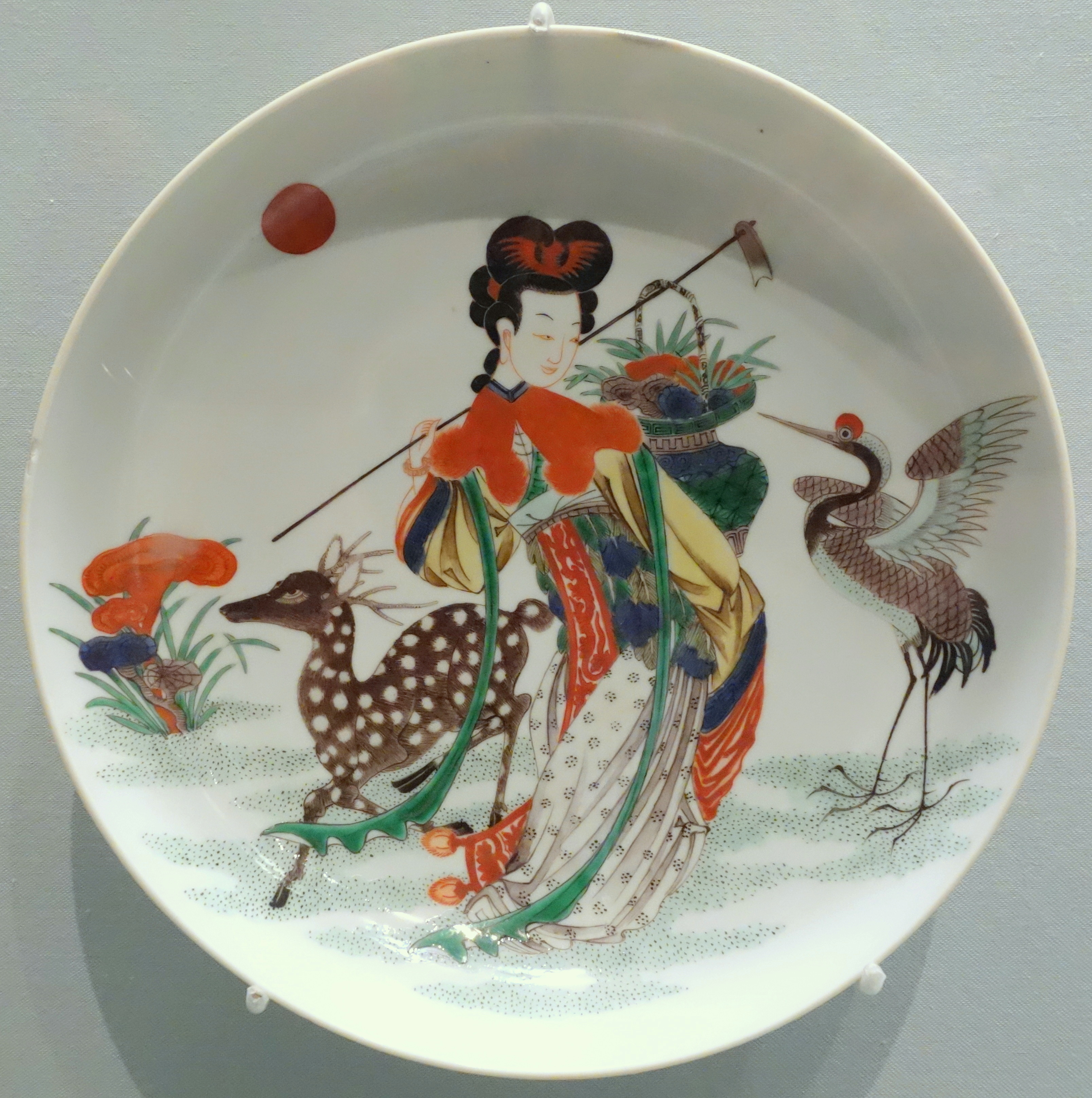
Dish with Magu, deity of longevity, China, Jingdezhen, Jiangxi province, Qing dynasty, approx. 1700–1800 AD, porcelain with overglaze polychrome

Magu is a legendary Taoist xian (transcendent"), still currently worshiped. Magu is associated with the elixir of life, and is a symbolic protector of females in Chinese mythology. Stories in Chinese literature describe Magu as a beautiful young woman with long birdlike fingernails, while early myths associate her with caves. Magu's name literally compounds two common Chinese words: ma "cannabis; hemp" and gu "aunt; maid".

==== Ghosts or spirits of the deceased ====
Common beliefs and stories in Chinese mythology involve a soul or spirit that survives after the death of someone's body. There are many types.

==== Living dead ====
Jiangshi are a type of re-animated corpse.

===== Zhong Kui =====
In the mythological folklore, Zhong Kui is regarded as a vanquisher of ghosts and evil beings. He committed suicide upon being unfairly stripped of his title of "Zhuangyuan" (top-scorer) of the Imperial Examinations by the emperor, due to his disfigured and ugly appearance. His spirit was condemned to Hell because suicide was considered a grave sin, but Yama (the Chinese Hell King) judged him worthy of the title "King of Ghosts" in Diyu (Hell). Yama tasked him to hunt, capture, take charge of, and maintain discipline and order of all ghosts. On Chinese New Year's eve, Zhong Kui returned to his hometown to repay the kindness of his friend Du Ping (杜平).

==== Holidays and festival rituals ====
Abundant mythology is associated with religious holidays and folk festivals.

===== Qingming Festival =====
The Qingming festival is a good example of a Chinese holiday that involves family activities associated with a seasonally-recurring annual event; and, also, ancestor veneration.

===== Qixi Festival =====
The seasonally-recurring annual holiday of Qixi involves love and romance. A main mythological tale is "The Cowherd and the Weaver Girl".

=== Weather deities ===
Various deities or spirits are associated with weather phenomena, such as drought or thunder. Dragons are often associated with rain. Examples include the deity or mythological person Ba, also known as Hànbá or Nuba. Ba is the daughter of the Yellow Emperor (Huangdi) whom she aided during his Battle at Zhuolu against Chiyou: after Chiyou had fielded a wind god (Feng Bo) and a rain god (Yu Shi), Ba descended from heaven to use her drought power to defeat their wind and rain powers. She is one of the first goddesses attested to in Chinese literature, appearing in the early collection of poetry, the Shijing, as well as in the later Shanhaijing. At least up through the middle of the twentieth century, ceremonies to produce rain were held in many regions of China. The basic idea of these ceremonies, which could last several hours, was to drive Ba out of the region. Another example is Lei Gong, god of thunder.

=== Astronomical deities ===
Various goddesses, gods, or spirits are especially associated with certain astronomical objects.

==== Sun (and Suns) ====
Various mythology involves the sun. One solar deity is Xihe, goddess of the sun. There is a myth of Kua Fu, a giant who followed the sun, during the course of his chase he drained all of the waters dry including the Yellow River, and after he died of thirst was transformed into a mountain range or a forest. Known as sānzúwū are three-legged raven or ravens associated with the sun, or the ten suns, of which Houyi shot down nine. Sometimes mythology portrays there being more than one sun.

===== Houyi and the Ten Suns =====
It was said that there were ten suns, each one taking a turn on its allotted day to cross the sky (this has been thought evidence of a ten-day week used at one time). There is a mythological account of how at one on a certain morning ten suns all rose into the sky together. The oppressive heat lead to drought, the plants began to wither, and humans and animals were all on the verge of death. A mighty archer Yi, or Houyi, shot down all but one of them, saving humanity.

==== Moon ====
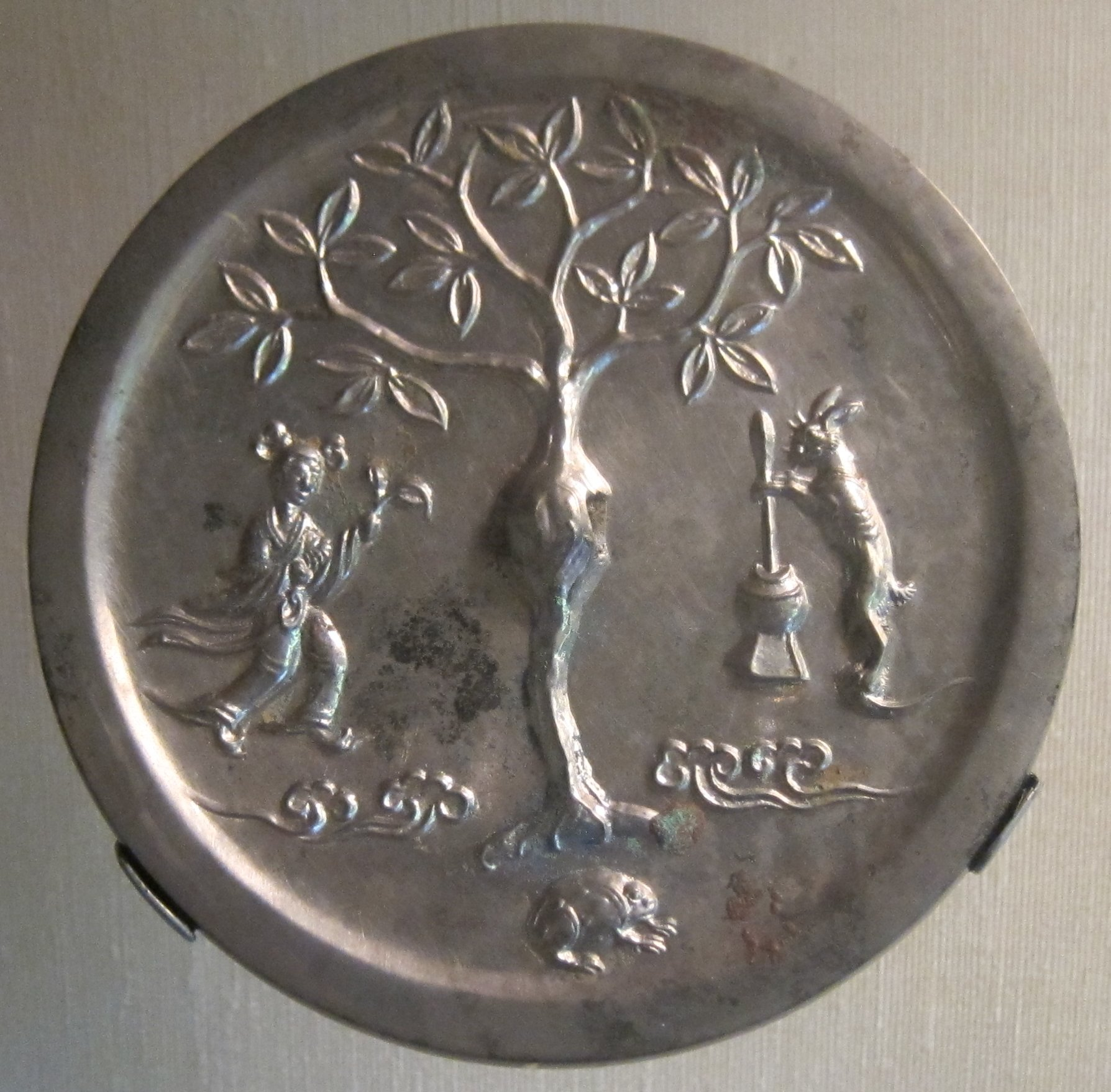
Tang dynasty bronze mirror with design on back depicting moon goddess, partially-chopped tree, three-legged toad, and rabbit with mortar and pestle

Chang'e (or in older versions Chang'O) is goddess of the moon. Another lunar deity is Changxi, probably an older version of Chang'e with the name changed due to a naming taboo. Chang'e is modern.

===== Chang'e =====
In mythology it was said that Chang'e had been married to the heroic archer Houyi, but one day she swallowed a Pill of Immortality and floated up to the moon. Now it is said Chang'e lives in a cold crystal palace on the moon. Every year during a full moon toward harvest time, Chang'e is worshiped. This is the Mid-Autumn Festival, families gather under the moonlight and celebrate in honour of the moon. Although somewhat lonely, Chang'e is not alone on the moon.

===== Wu Gang and the Magic Tree =====
A magical tree grows on the moon. It is possibly an osmanthus tree (Osmanthus fragrans), some type of laurel (Lauraceae), such as a cassia such as (Cinnamomum cassia), but more likely a unique specimen of a magical tree. Every month the xian Wu Gang cuts away at the tree, chopping it smaller and smaller. Then, just when he just has it chopped completely down, it magically grows back. Once it has grown back Wu Gang returns to his chopping, in an endless monthly cycle.

===== Rabbit in the Moon =====
An alchemical hare or rabbit lives on the moon. The lunar rabbit can be seen when the moon is full, busy with mortar and pestle, preparing the Elixir of Immortality.

===== Three-legged toad =====
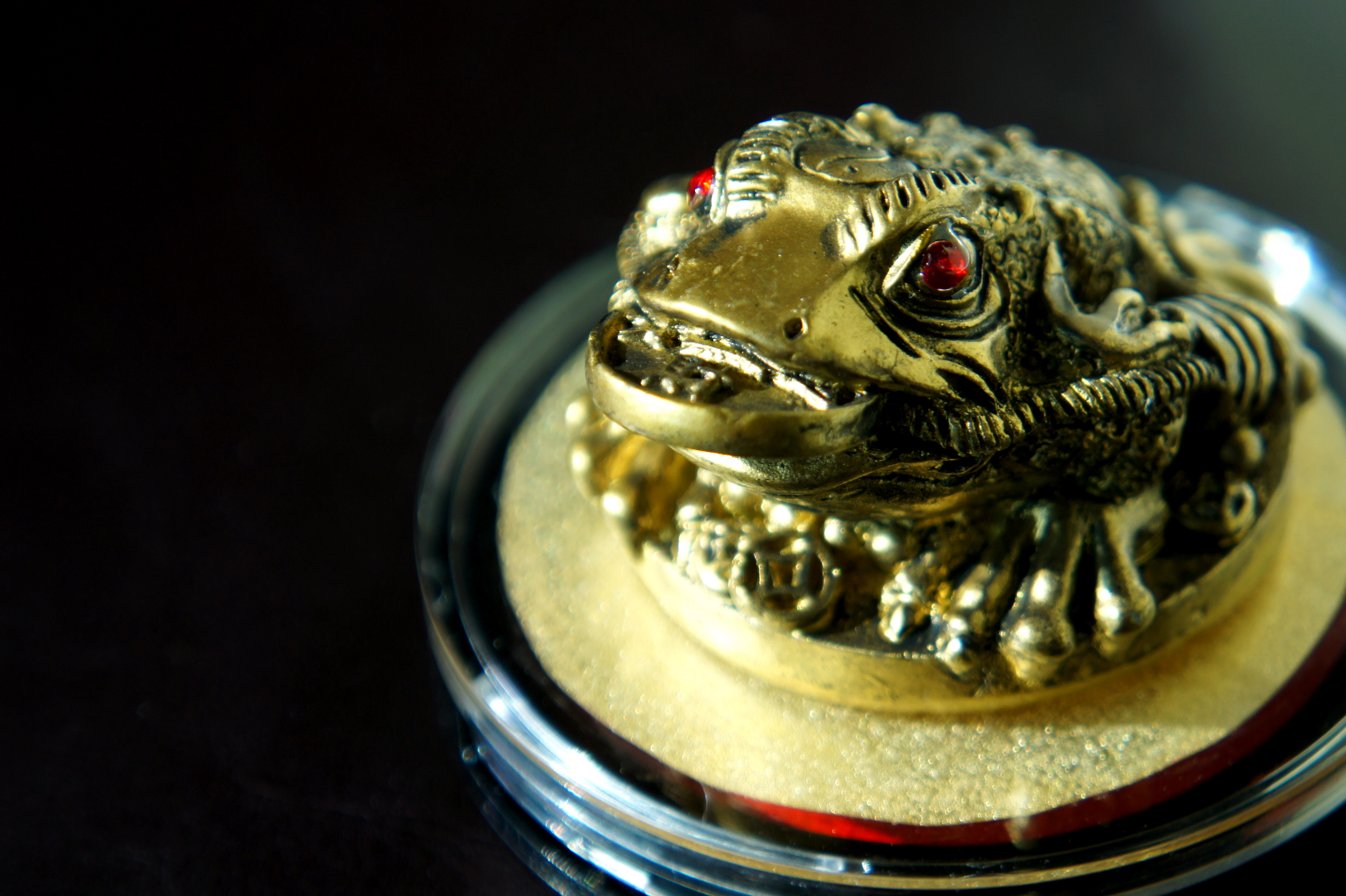
Good-fortune three-legged toad with a reservoir for vermilion ink paste used for stamping seals

(See Liu Haichan for Chinese characters)

A three-legged toad lives on the moon. During full moons the three-legged Golden Toad Jin Chan frequents near houses or businesses that will soon receive good news generally in the form of wealth. Also known as a Money Toad, statuettes of this toad are used as a charm in Fengshui. The mythology of the Immortal Liu Haichan (who seems to be a form of Caishen/Zhao Gong, God of Wealth) is associated with this tripedal toad.

=== Deities of places ===
Various goddesses, gods, spirits, fairies, or monsters are associated with specific places, such as particular rivers, mountains, or the ocean. Some of these locations are associated with real geography, others are known only through mythological imagination.

==== Xi Wangmu ====
Xi Wangmu, meaning Queen Mother of the West, predates organized Daoism, yet is now strongly identified with Daoism. Xi Wangmu is generally mythologically located in a western wonderland "to the west", now identified with the Kunlun of mythology. Thus, she is the ruler of a passageway between Earth and Heaven.

===== Mazu =====
Mazu is a major goddess. She is a goddess of the sea. Mazu worship is credited with leading to miraculous salvations at sea, protecting sailors and travelers from drowning. She is a tutelary deity of seafarers, including fishermen and sailors, especially along coastal China and areas of the Chinese diaspora.

==== Xiang River goddesses ====
The two Xiang River goddesses are ancient in mythology. They are associated with the Xiang River in the former Chu area of China. They are also mythologically credited with causing a certain type of bamboo to develop a mottled appearance said to resemble tear-drops (lacrima deae). The two Xiang River goddesses (Xiangfei) are named Éhuáng and Nǚyīng.

=== Deities or spirits of human activities ===
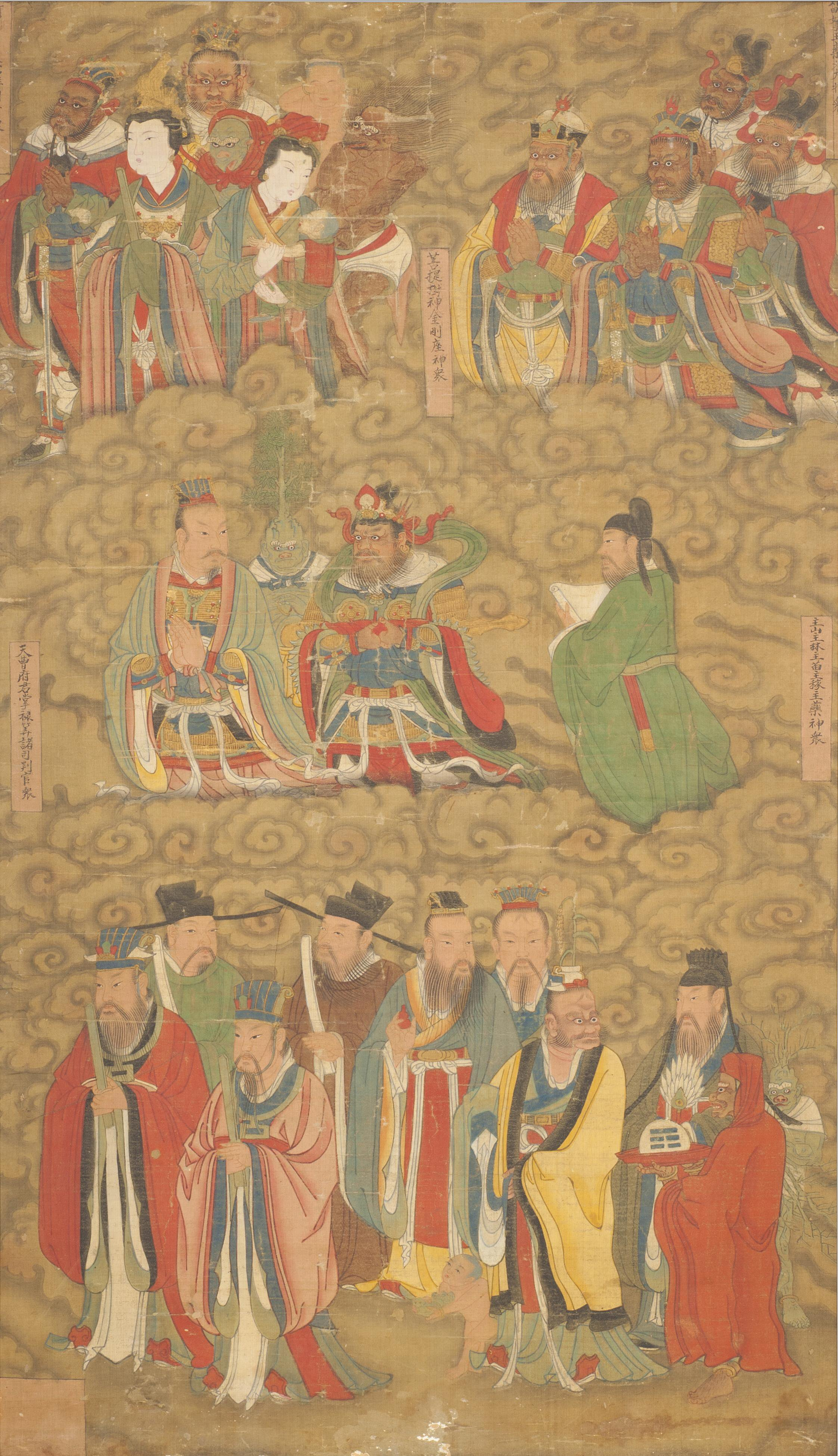
Shuilu ritual painting of Guardians and Deities

Various deities or spirits are associated with certain human activities. Various deities or spirits are associated with the households in general or with cities. Some provide tutelary help to persons pursuing certain occupations or seeking to have children.

==== Household deities and spirits ====
The Chinese household was often the subject of mythology and related ritual. The welfare of the family was mythologically-related to the perceived help of helpful deities and spirits, and avoiding the baneful effects of malicious ones. Of these household deities the most important was the kitchen god Zao Jun. The Kitchen God was viewed as a sort of intermediary between the household and the supreme god, who would judge, then reward or punish a household based on the Kitchen God's report. Zao Jun was propitiated at appropriate times by offerings of food and incense, and various mythological stories about him exist. Lesser deities or spirits were also thought to help out the household through their intervention. For example, the guardians of the doors, the Menshen pair and others.

==== Territories administrators ====
Various deities and spirits have been mythologically associated with the welfare of areas of land and with cities. Some were good, tutelary guardians: others were malicious ghosts or evil hauntings.

===== Houtu =====
Houtu is a guardian deity of the earth.

===== Tudi =====
The Tudi or Tudigong were the spiritual dukes or gods in charge of protecting particular parcels of land, acting as the local gods of individual villages.

===== City gods =====
In old China, the city was almost synonymous with the city wall. Most cities also had a moat, made to further protect the perimeter of the city and as an artifact of building the ramparts. A City god guarded an individual city. There were many cities and many city gods.

==== Occupational tutelaries ====
The life of a scholar has long been pursued in China, in part due to rewarding those who study hard and do well in standardized tests. There is a whole area of myth around the Imperial examination in Chinese mythology. For example, in the area of literature, success in standardized tests, and other culture there are associated pair Kui Xing and Wenchang Wang.

==== Life and social association ====
There are deities mythologically associated with various intimate aspects of human life, including motherhood, general sodality and formal syndicals, lifespan and fate, and war and death. Many are currently worshiped in Buddhism, Daoism, or Chinese folk religion. Guandi is a prominent example, but there are many others.

===== Promoters of health =====
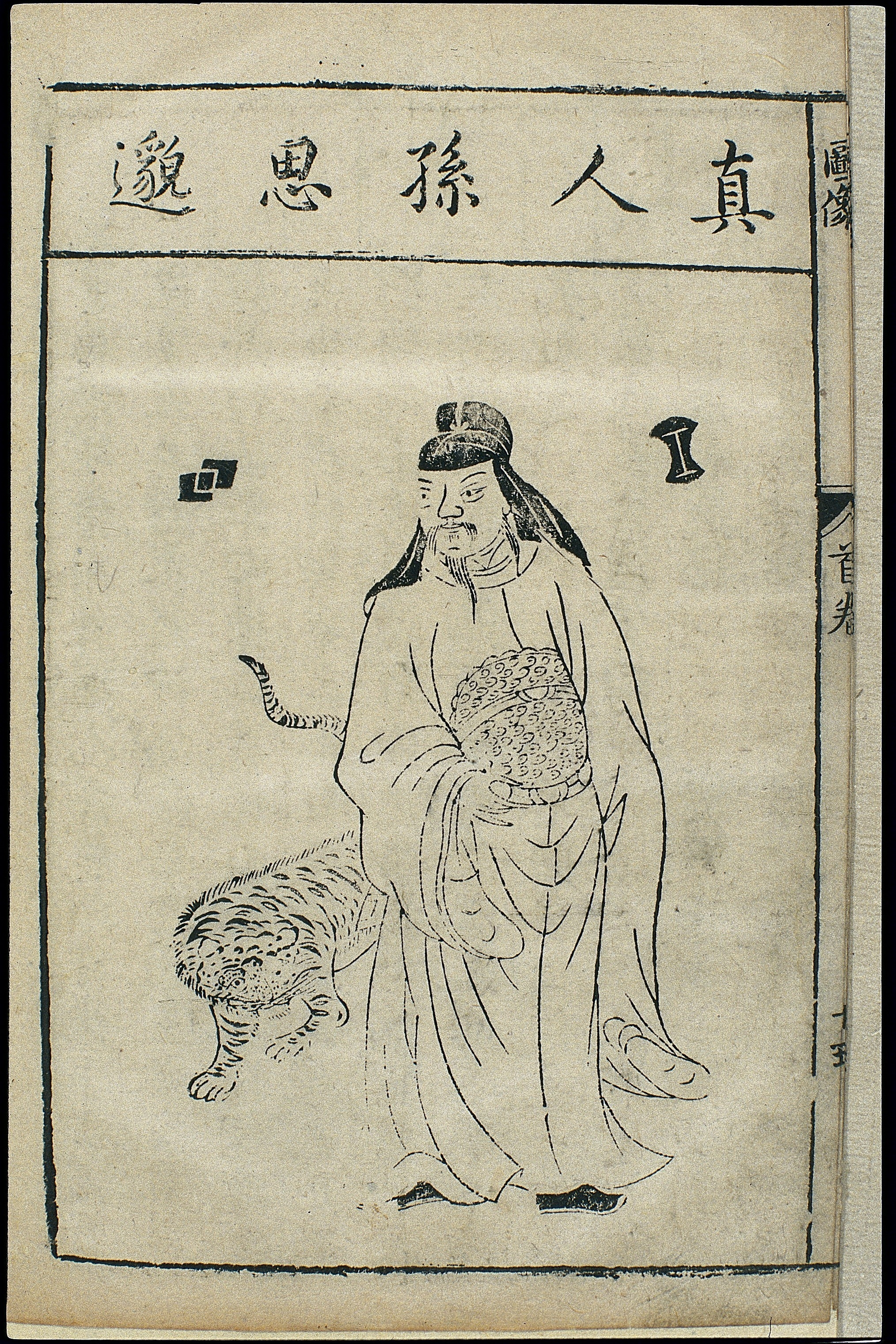
Chinese woodcut, Famous medical figures: Sun Simiao

A good example of a medicine deity is Sun Simiao, who became Yaowang. Another is Baosheng Dadi.

===== Bixia =====
Bixia is mythologically connected with motherhood and fertility. She is currently a popular goddess.

===== Siming =====
The Siming is a god of lifespan and fate.

===== Male sexuality =====
Tu'er Shen is a leveret or rabbit gay deity, patron of gay men who engage in same gender love and sexual activities.

=== Miscellaneous mythological beings ===
Various deities, spirits, or other mythological beings are encountered in Chinese mythology, some of them related to the religious beliefs of China. Some of them are currently worshiped, some of them now only appear as characters in myths, and some both ways.

- Fangfeng: the giant who helped fight flood, executed by Yu the Great
- Feng Meng: apprentice to Hou Yi, and his eventual murderer
- Gao Yao
- Nezha: Taoist protection deity
- Tam Kung: sea deity with the ability to forecast weather
- Yuqiang: Yellow Emperor's descendant, god of north sea and wind
- Daoji: compassionate folk hero known for wild and eccentric behaviour
- Erlang Shen: possessed a third eye in the middle of his forehead that saw the truth

==== Heroes ====
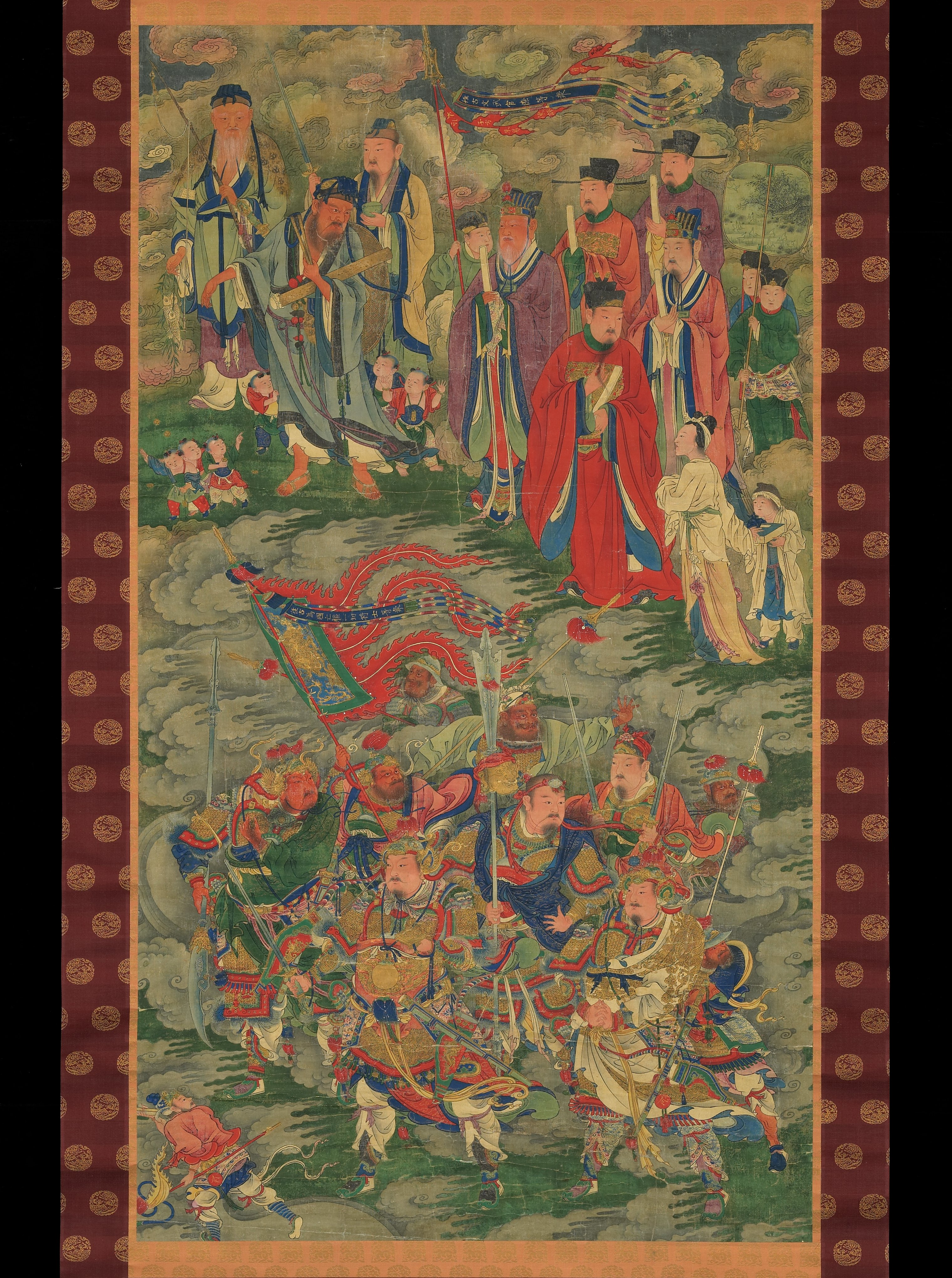
Martyred Generals Who Died for their Country and Officials of Former Times, Ming dynasty

===== Xingtian =====
Xingtian is a headless giant decapitated by the Yellow Emperor as punishment for challenging him; his face is on his torso as he has no head.

== Mythological creatures ==
Non-divine mythological beings are sometimes divided into several parts each ruled over by a particular type of being—humans ruled over by the Emperor, winged creatures ruled over by the phoenix, and scaly, finned, or crawly creatures ruled over by the dragon. However, whatever the approach, mythological taxonomy is not a rigorous discipline, not even as clear as folk taxonomy, much less the scientific efforts which result in modern biological taxonomy. Often, mythological creatures inhabit the furthest reaches of the exotic imagination.

=== The Four Symbols ===
The Four Symbols were four species of animals of particular intelligence (not considering humans). Each one represented and ruled over a class of animals. They are the Azure Dragon of the East, the Vermilion Bird of the South, the White Tiger of the West, and the Black Tortoise (also called "Black Warrior") of the North.

=== Dragons, dragon-like and related creatures ===
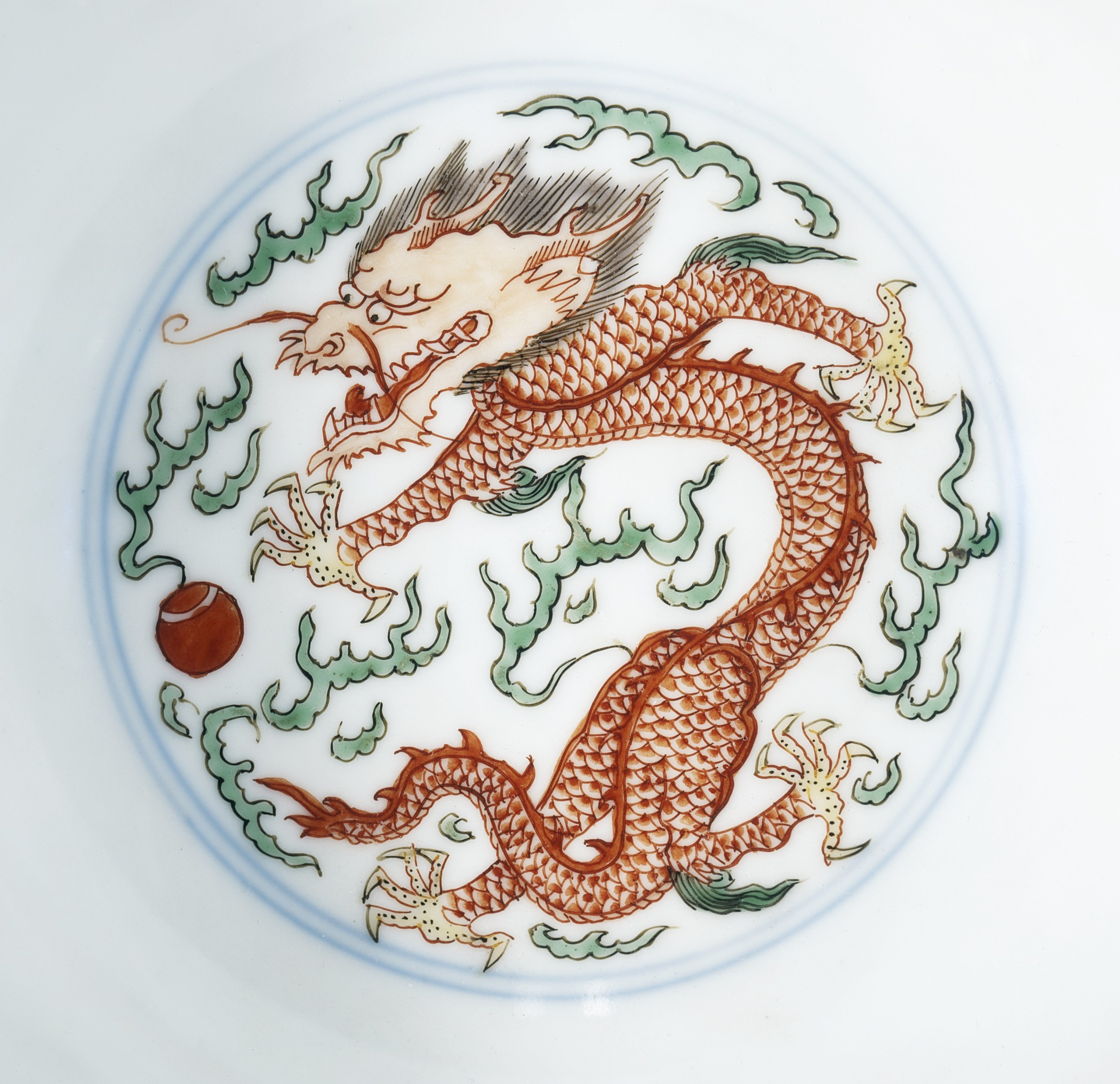
Porcelain bowl with dragon chasing a Flaming Pearl

The Chinese dragon is one of the most important mythical creatures in Chinese mythology, considered to be the most powerful and divine creature and the controller of all waters who could create clouds with their breath. The dragon symbolized great power and was very supportive of heroes and gods. The conventional dragon has a certain description, however there are other dragons or dragon-like beings that vary from this description. For example, the Chi of mythology lacks horns. Dragons often chase or play with a mystical or flaming pearl. A dragon-fenghuang pairing is a common motif in art, the fenghuang often being called a "phoenix".

One of the most famous dragons in Chinese mythology is Yinglong, the god of rain. Many people in different places pray to Yinglong to receive rain. Chinese people use the term 龍的傳人 ("Descendants of the Dragon") as a sign of their ethnic identity. Shenlong is a master of storms and bringer of rain. Zhulong the Torch Dragon is a giant red solar deity. Sometimes he appears in composite snake-like, human-dragon form. There were various dragon kings. They mostly lived undersea and were of the Ao family, such as Ao Guang.

Various mythology accounting human-dragon relationships exist, such as the story of Longmu, a woman who raised dragons.

Specific dragons, or types of dragon, include: Dilong, the earth dragon; Fucanglong, the treasure dragon; Jiaolong, dragon of floods and sea; Teng, a flying creature, sometimes considered a type of snake or dragon-snake; Tianlong, the celestial dragon, sometimes associated with centipede qualities; Yinglong, the water dragon, a powerful servant of the Yellow Emperor.

The fourteenth monarch of the Xia dynasty is said to be Kong Jia, who, according to mythology, raised dragons.

=== Fish and fish-like ===
Various mythology of China involves fish or fish-like beings. Part human, part sea creatures of the Mermaid (人魚) type appear. The Kun (or Peng) was a giant monstrous fish transformation of the Peng bird. Carp that leapt the dragon gate falls of the Yellow River were said to transform into dragons. This was used as a symbol for a scholar's successful graduation in the Imperial examination system.

=== Snakelike and reptilian ===
Nine-headed Snake, (the Xiangliu), from a version of Shanhaijing.

Various snakes and reptilians appear in Chinese mythology, folklore, and religion. These range from divine or semi-divine to merely fantastic types of the bestiary sort. Sometimes the dragon is considered part of this category, related to it, or the ruler of all the swimming and crawling folk. This may include the giant marine turtle or tortoise Ao, the Bashe snake reputed to swallow elephants, a nine-headed snake monster reminiscent of the hydra known as Xiangliu, and the White Serpent from the novel Legend of the White Snake.

Some xian were thought to have reptile and birdlike features in the Han Dynasty.

=== Birds ===
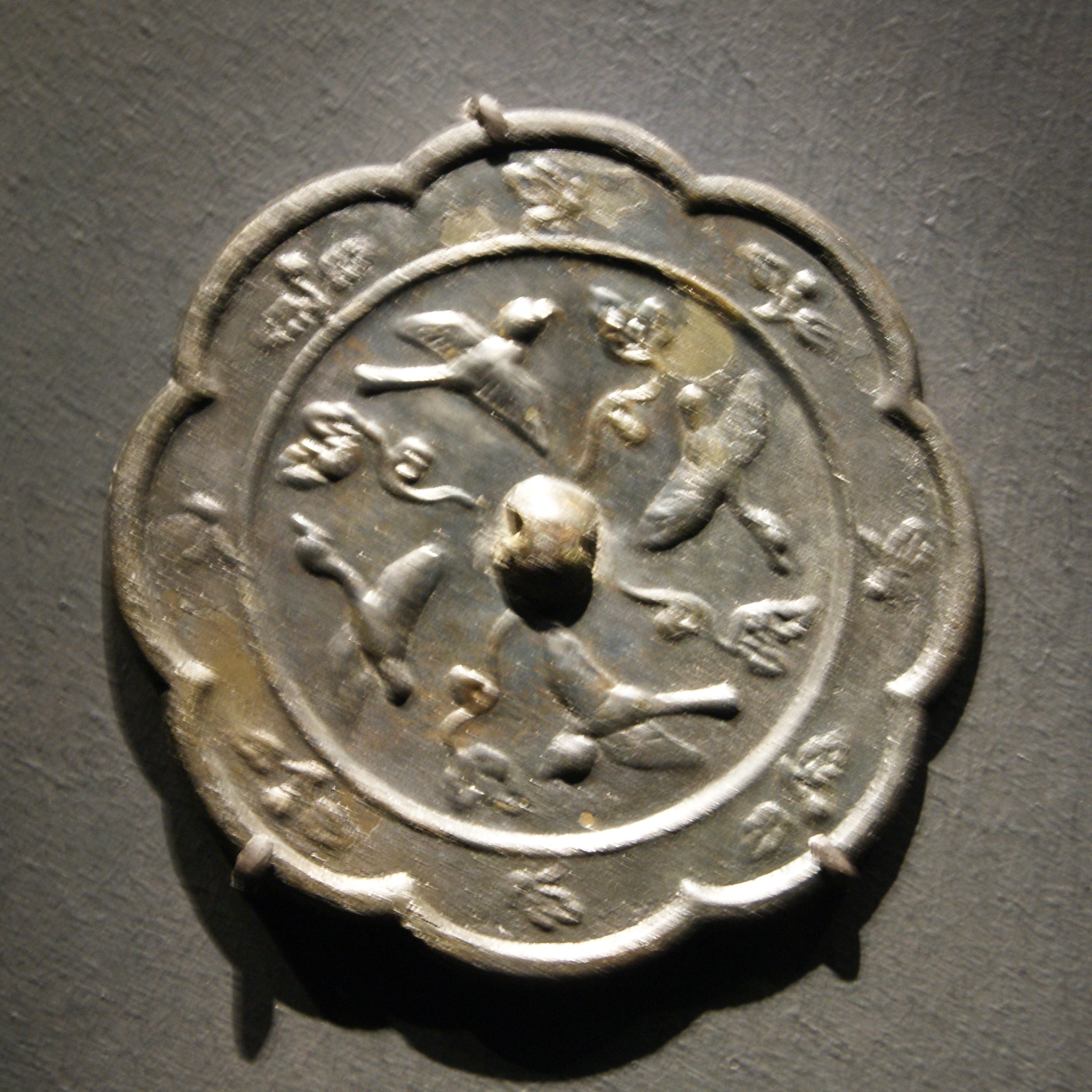
Bronze mirror with birds from the Belitung shipwreck

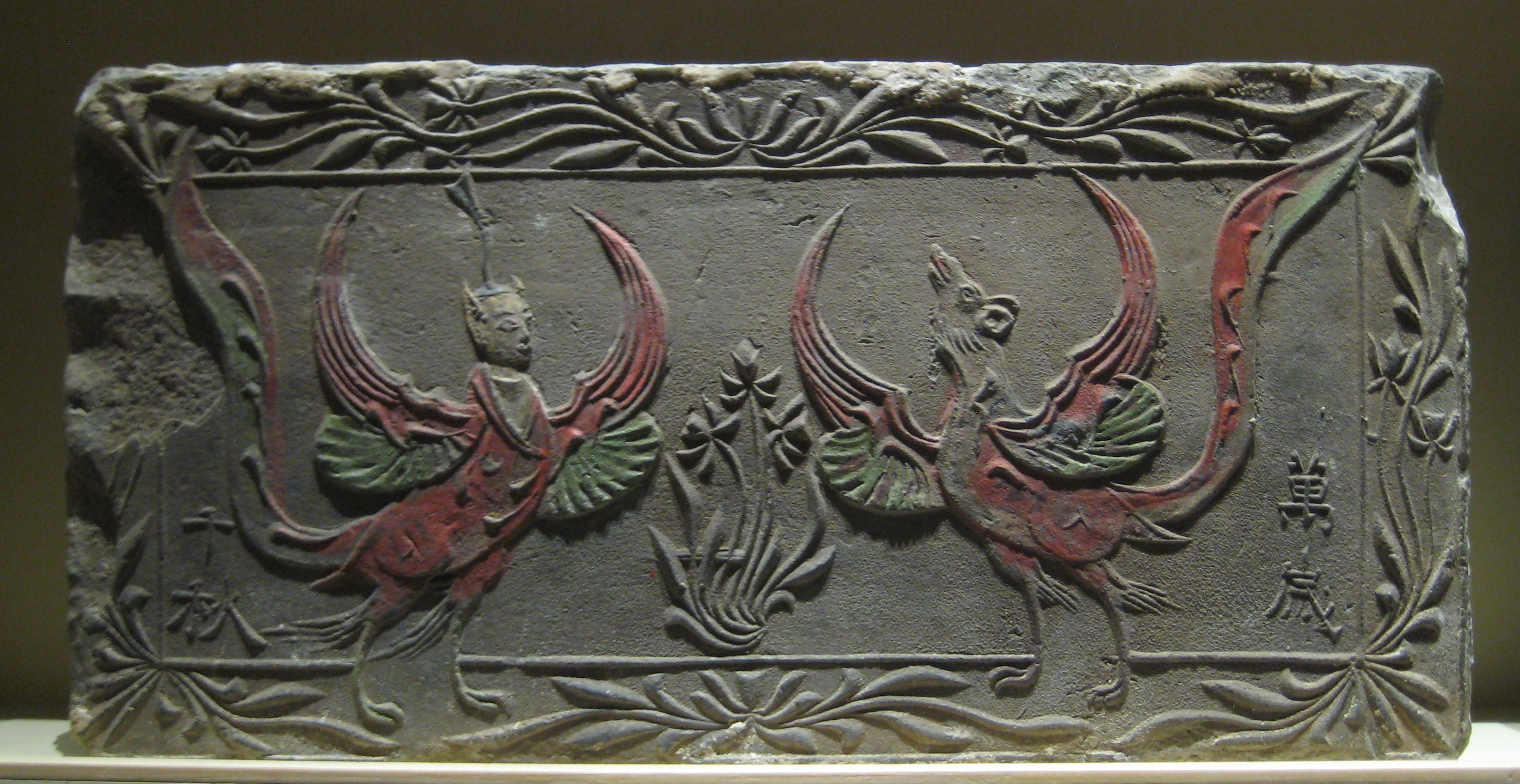
Phoenixlike deities

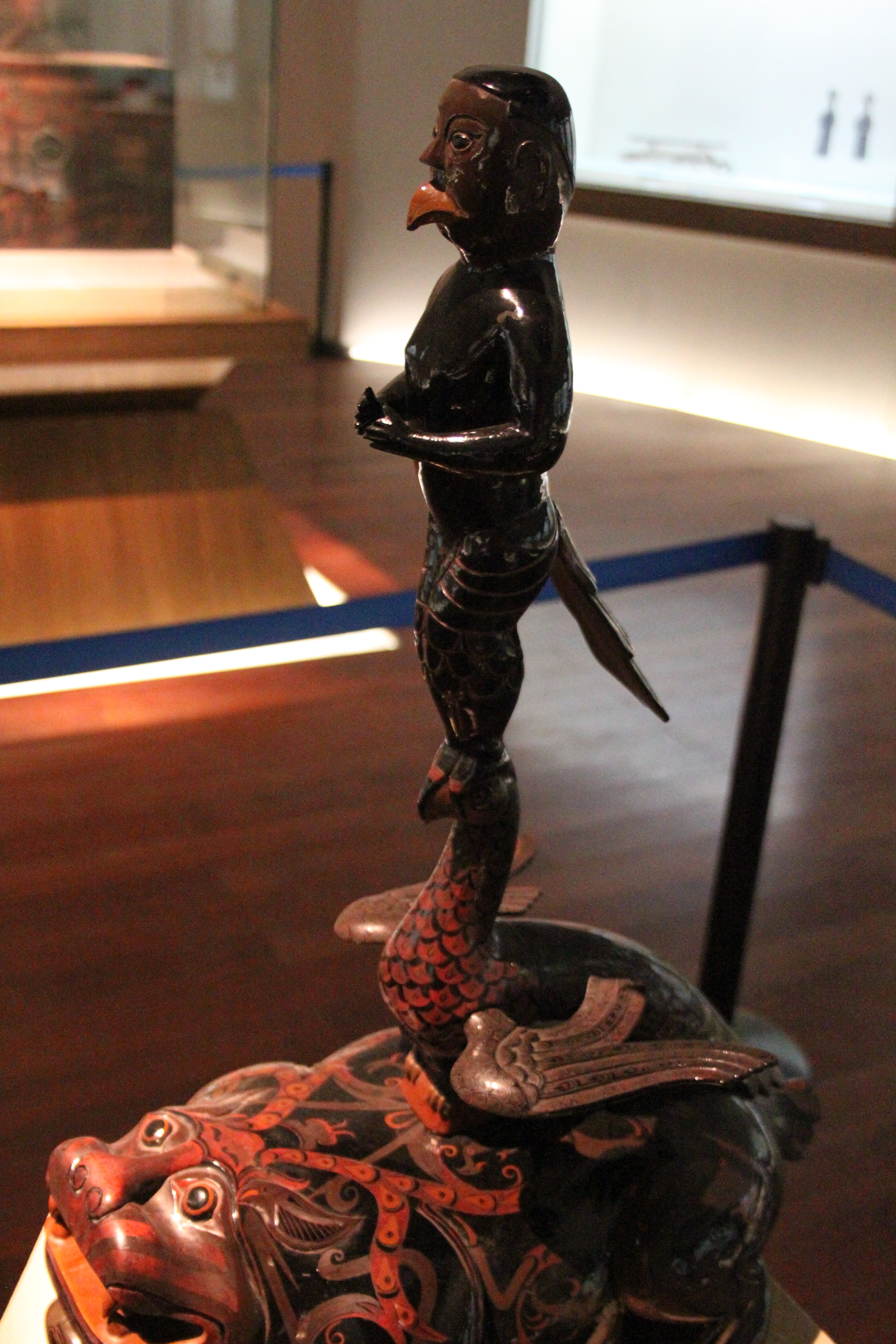
Lacquered yuren (羽人) figure on a toad stand, Chu (state) of the Warring States

Various birds are found in Chinese mythology, some of them obviously based on real birds, other ones obviously not, and some in-between. The Crane is an example of a real type of bird with mythological enhancements. Cranes are linked with immortality, and may be transformed xian immortals, or ferry an immortal upon their back. Early depictions of immortals also had a birdlike appearance. The Vermilion Bird is iconic of the south. Sometimes confused with the Fenghuang, the vermilion bird of the south is associated with fire. The Peng was a gigantic bird phase of the gigantic Kun fish. The Jingwei is a mythical bird which tries to fill up the ocean with twigs and pebbles symbolizing indefatigable determination. The Qingniao was the messenger or servant of Xi Wangmu.

Other birds include the Bi Fang bird, a one-legged bird. Bi is also number nineteen of the Twenty-Eight Mansions of traditional Chinese astronomy, the Net (Bi). There are supposed to be the Jiān (鶼; jian^{1}): the mythical one-eyed bird with one wing; Jianjian (鶼鶼): a pair of such birds dependent on each other, inseparable, hence representing husband and wife. There was a Shang-Yang rainbird. The Jiufeng is a nine-headed bird used to scare children. The Sù Shuāng (鷫鷞; su^{4}shuang^{3}) sometimes appears as a goose-like bird. The Zhen is a poisonous bird. There may be a Jiguang (吉光; jíguāng).

=== Mythological humanoid ===
Mythological humanoids include the former human, the part-human and the human-like, although these sometimes merge into other categories. Examples include Kui: one-legged mountain demon or dragon who invented music and dance; also Shun's or Yao's Music Master, Xiāo (魈; xiao^{1}) mountain spirit(s) or demon(s), and Yaoguai demons.

Xian are immortal humanoid beings with a variety of depictions, usually with human features.

=== Mythological mammalians ===
Various mythological mammals exist in Chinese mythology. Some of these form the totem animals of the Chinese zodiac. The Chinese language of mythology tends not to mark words for gender or number, so English language translations can be problematic. Also, species or even genera are not always distinguished, with the named animal often being seen as the local version of that type, such is as the case with sheep and goats, or the versatile term sometimes translated as ox.

==== Fox spirits ====
Fox spirits feature prominently in mythology throughout the mythology of East Asia. In China, these are generally known as Huli jing. There are various types, such as the nine-tailed fox.

==== Dogs ====
Various dogs appear in the mythology of China, featuring more prominently in some ethnic cultures more than others. The zodiacal dog is featured in the Chinese zodiac.

==== Bovidae ====
The Bovidae appearing in the mythologies of China include oxen (including the common cow, buffalo, and the yak), sheep and goats, and perhaps antelopes (some times "unicorns" are thought to be types of antelopes).

===== Ox =====
References to oxen may include those to the common cow, the buffalo, and the yak. The zodiacal ox is one of the twelve zodiacal signs in the twelve-year calendar cycle. Yak tails are mentioned as magical whisks used by Daoist sorcerers. The ox appears in various agricultural myths.

===== Sheep and goats =====
Sheep (and/or goats) appear in various myths and stories. The zodiacal sheep is one of the twelve zodiacal signs in the twelve-year calendar cycle. A semi-mythical, semi-historical story involves the adventures of the Han diplomat Su Wu held captive among the Xiongnu for nineteen years and forced to herd sheep and/or goats.

==== Horses ====
Horses frequently gallop through Chinese mythology. Sometimes the poets say that they are related to dragons. The zodiacal horse is one of the twelve zodiacal signs in the twelve-year calendar cycle.

==== Unicorns ====
Various types of "unicorns" can be found in the myths, designated by the term lin, which is often translated as "unicorn". They possess many similarities to the European unicorn, although not necessarily having only one horn. There are six types of lin. One type of lin is the Qilin, a chimeric or composite animal with several variations. Xu Shen in his early 2nd century CE) dictionary Shuowen Jiezi defines what is represented by this particular lin as "an animal of benevolence, having the body of an antelope, the tail of an ox, and a single horn." Also, according to the Shuowen Jiezi, the horn was sometimes said to have been frightening in appearance to scare off would be attackers, but really flesh-tipped so as to cause no harm. Lin, or unicorns appear only during the reign of benevolent rulers. In 451 BCE, Confucius recorded that a unicorn had appeared, but was slain in a ducal hunt. Confucius was so upset upon reporting this that he set aside his brush and wrote no more. The giraffe was not well known in China and poorly described: about 1200 CE the lin and the giraffe began to trade characteristics in their mythological conceptions. It is possible that the unicorns resulted from different descriptions of animals which later became extinct, or they no longer ranged in the area of China.

==== Cats ====
Various cats appear in Chinese mythology, many of them large. Examples are Pixiu, resembled a winged lion, and Rui Shi (瑞獅, Ruì Shī), guardian lions. Sometimes they are found pulling the chariot of Xiwangmu. The cat is one of the twelve annual zodiacal animals in Vietnamese and related cultural calendars, having the place of the rabbit found in the Chinese system.

==== Non-bovid ungulates ====
Various non-bovid ungulates are encountered. Xīniú: a rhinoceros, became mythologized when rhinoceroses became extinct in China. Depictions later changed to a more bovine appearance, with a short, curved horn on its head used to communicate with the sky.

==== Simian ====
Various beings with simian characteristics appear in Chinese mythology and religion. The Monkey King was a warder of evil spirits, respected and loved, an ancient deity at least influenced by the Hindu deity Hanuman. The Monkey god is still worshiped by some people in modern China. Some of the mythology associated with the Monkey King influenced the novel Journey to the West. The xiao of mythology appears as a long-armed ape or a four-winged bird, making it hard to categorize exactly; but this is true of various composite beings of mythology.

==== Draconid mammalian ====
The Longma is a composite beast, like a winged horse similar to the Qilin, with scales of a dragon.

=== Four Perils ===
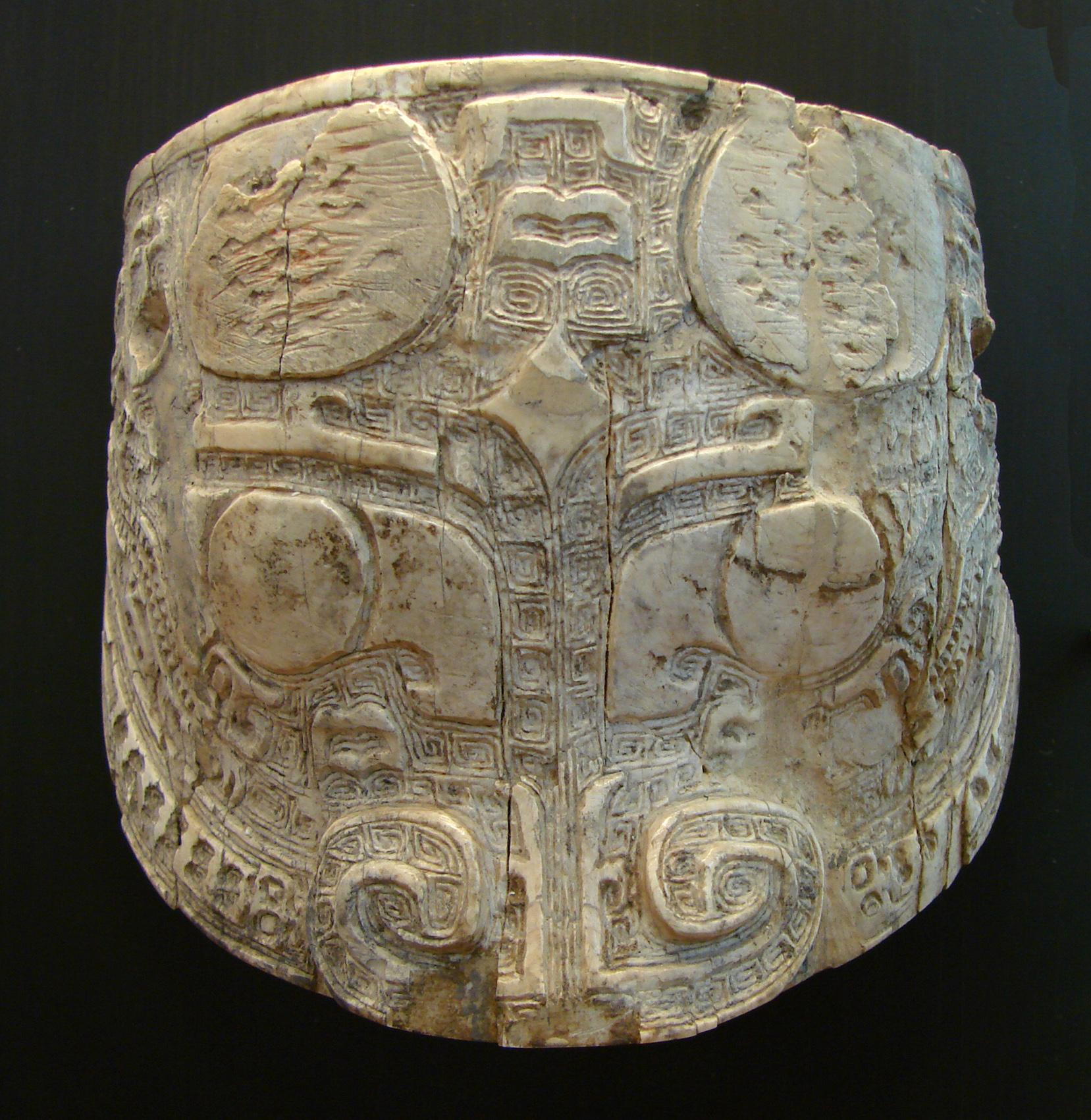
Taotie ivory mask, Shang dynasty, twelfth or eleventh century BCE

The Four Perils:

- Hundun: chaos
- Taotie: gluttony
- Taowu (梼杌): ignorance; provided confusion and apathy and made mortals free of the curiosity and reason needed to reach enlightenment
- Qiongqi (窮奇): deviousness

=== Miscellaneous or other ===
- Nian: lives under the sea or in mountains; attacks children
- Luduan: can detect the truth
- Xiezhi (also Xie Cai): the creature of justice said to be able to distinguish lies from truths; it had a long, straight horn used to gore liars
- Bai Ze: legendary creature said to have been encountered by the Yellow Emperor and to have given him a compendium listing all the demons in the world

== Mythological plants ==
Various mythological plants appear in Chinese mythology. Some of these in Heaven or Earthly Paradises, some of them in particularly inaccessible or hard-to-find areas of the Earth; examples include the Fusang world tree habitation of sun(s), the Lingzhi mushrooms of immortality, the Peaches of Immortality, and the magical Yao Grass. Also encountered are various plants of jasper and jade growing in the gardens of the Paradises.

== Mythological objects ==
Various mythological objects form a part of Chinese mythology, including gems, pearls, magical bronzes, and weapons. Examples include a wish-fulfilling jewel; various luminous gemstones, the Marquis of Sui's pearl, auspicious pearls associated with dragon imagery; and, the Nine Tripod Cauldrons which conferred legitimacy to the dynastic ruler of the Nine Provinces of China. The weaponry motif is common in Chinese mythology, for example, the heroic archer Yi is supposed to have shot down nine problematic suns with a magical bow and arrows given to him by Di Jun.

=== Jewels ===
Jewels include a wish-fulfilling jewel; various luminous gemstones, the Marquis of Sui's pearl, auspicious pearls associated with dragon imagery.

=== Weapons ===
Weapons include Guanyu's pole weapon, sometimes known as the Green Dragon Crescent Blade. Also: the shield and battleaxe of Xingtian, Yi's bow and arrows, given him by Di Jun, and the many weapons and armor of Chiyou.

== Major sources ==
Some myths survive in theatrical or literary formats as plays or novels, others are still collected from the oral traditions of China and surrounding areas. Other material can be gleaned from examining various other artifacts such as Chinese ritual bronzes, ceramics, paintings, silk tapestries and elements of Chinese architecture. The oldest written sources of Chinese mythology are short inscriptions, rather than literature as such. The earliest written evidence is found in the Oracle bone script, written on scapulae or tortoise plastrons, in the process of the divination practices Shang dynasty (ended approximately 1046 BCE). A copious and eclectic source of information on Chinese mythology is the written materials recovered from the Dunhuang manuscripts library, now scattered in libraries around the world.

=== Shells and bones ===
The earliest known written inscriptions of Chinese mythology are found on the shells and bones from about 3000 years before present. These shells and bones were inscribed with records of divinatory processes during the late Shang dynasty, also known as the Yin dynasty after its capital at Yin, near modern Anyang, in Hebei province. The use of these artifacts in the study of mythology is limited to fragmentary references, such as names, at best. No actual mythological narrative is known from the Shang oracle bones and shells.

=== Bronzes ===
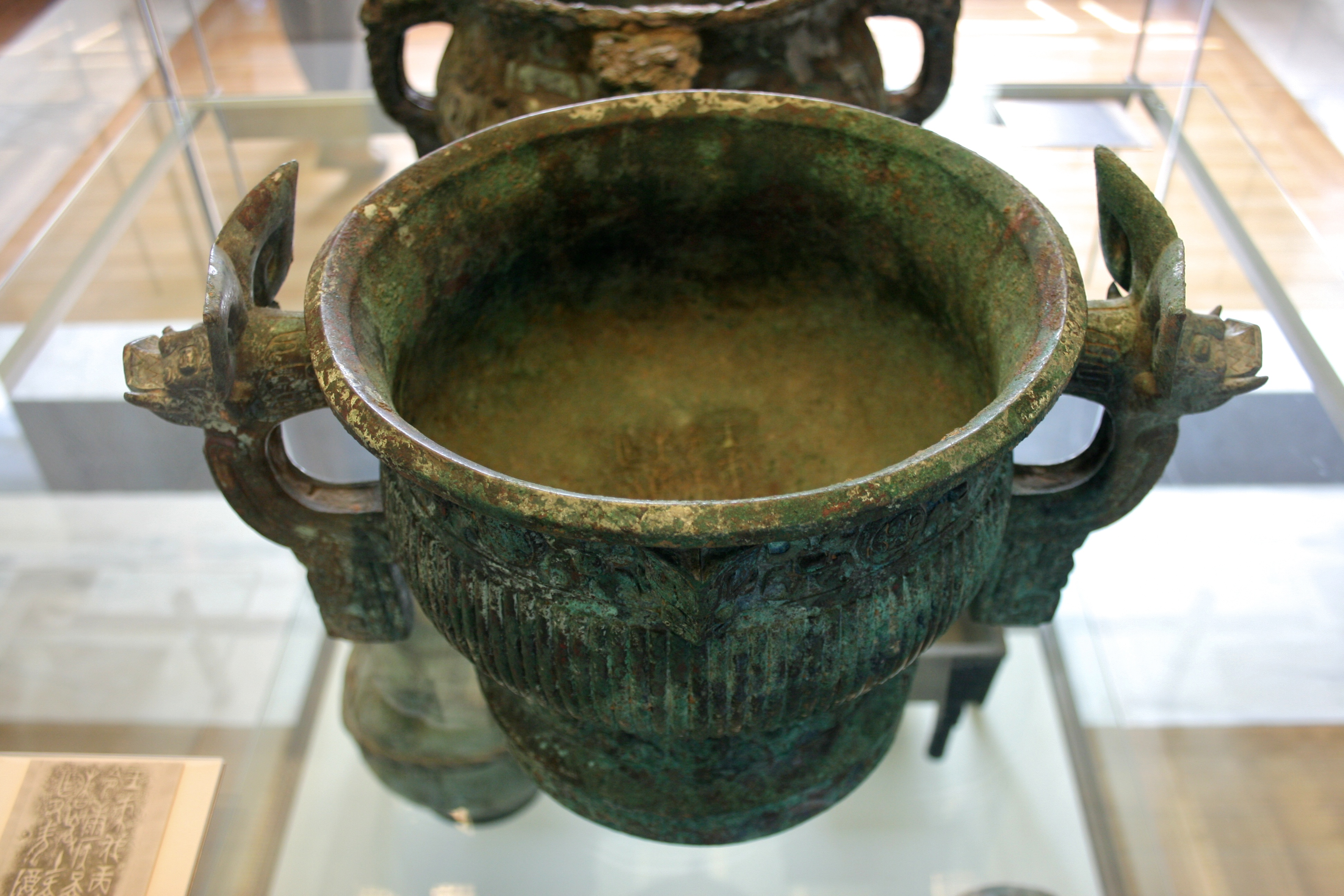
Zhou dynasty ritual Gui (vessel) vessel (the "Kang Hou gui"), with inscription barely visible on inside bottom, British Museum

Very ancient bronze pieces have also been found, especially beginning in the Zhou dynasty (founded about 3,000 years before present), with allusions or short descriptions adding to modern knowledge of Ancient Chinese mythology. The sacred or magical attitude towards some of these cast inscriptions is shown in that they sometimes appear in places almost inaccessible to being read, such as the inside of a vessel (often quite large and heavy, often covered with a lid, and perhaps meant to store food). However, there was a widespread belief that such writings were read by gods or spirits. One such vessel (a xu (盨), with the characters appearing on the inside-bottom) is a Zhou bronze with a 98-character description of the deeds of Yu draining the flood.

=== Literary sources ===
Various Chinese literature addresses the subject area of Chinese mythology. In some cases, some preservation of mythology occurs, either deliberately or incidentally. In other cases, the mythology inspires literary works which are not strictly of a mythological nature, for example works of fiction, didactic works of philosophy, or, more modernly, computer games and the names associated with Chinese explorations into outer space, the deep ocean, or the north and south polar regions. Approaching a rough organization of the topic of literature relating to Chinese mythology may be chronologic. The early textual materials mainly survive from the later Zhou dynasty; that is, Eastern Zhou, from about 450 to 221 BCE. Although these texts are relatively less editorial treated than some later texts, they are not the same as the original pre-literary myths. The next major period of textual sources for Chinese mythology dates from the start of the Qin dynasty (221 BCE), through the end of the Han dynasty (220 CE), and continuing through the end of the subsequent periods of disunity (581 CE). The surviving texts from this era often reflect evolution of the mythological substratum. Beginning with the establishment of the Sui dynasty and continuing through the subsequent Tang dynasty, Song dynasty, and Ming dynasty (ended 1644). During this period Chinese mythology developed into what now may be considered to be its traditional form. The Song literature is particularly valuable for the often verbatim transcriptions of mythological material from otherwise unpreserved earlier sources. In modern times, Chinese mythology has both become the subject of global study and inspiration, including popular culture.

==== Chuci and poetry sources ====
Some information on Chinese mythology is found in the verse poetry associated with the ancient state of Chu such as "Lisao", "Jiu Ge", and "Heavenly Questions", contained in the Chuci anthology, traditionally attributed to the authorship of Qu Yuan of Chu. The Chuci (together with some of its commentaries) in the form known today was compiled during Han, but contains some older material, dating back at least to the waning days of the Zhou dynasty (the Warring States period), prior to the 221 BCE defeat of Chu (state) during the rise of the Qin dynasty. Later poetic sources also address this mythology as a continuation of this poetic tradition, for example, Tang poetry.

==== Zhou dynasty literature ====
Some information can be found in the Confucian Classics, such as the Shijing and Yijing, and other Zhou dynasty era material, especially Book of Rites, but also the Lüshi Chunqiu. The Book of Documents contains some Chinese myths.

==== Literature of Qin-Han to Sui ====
===== Han dynasty =====
The Han dynasty existed from 206 BCE – 220 CE (with a brief intermission separating it into two halves). Han was preceded by the short-lived Qin dynasty, 221 to 206 BC, which has some important surviving literature. In the Qin and Han periods, besides the Chuci, useful historical documents include the Records of the Grand Historian, completed by Han historian Sima Qian before his death in about 220 CE. Legends were passed down for over a thousand years before being written in books such as Classic of Mountains and Seas (Shanhaijing), basically a gazetteer mixing known and mythological geography. Another major Han source on mythology is the Huainanzi.

===== Post-Han, pre-Sui disunity period =====
The mythologically relevant book Soushen Ji dates to the Jin dynasty (266–420), during the Sixteen Kingdoms era. Also known as In Search of the Supernatural and A Record of Researches into Spirits, it is a 4th-century compilation of stories and hearsay concerning spirits, ghosts, and supernatural phenomena, some of which being of mythological importance, including a "great deal" of pre-Han mythological narrative.

==== Sui, Tang, and Ming ====
===== Tang dynasty =====
The Tang dynasty had a flourishing literature, including prose and poetry involving mythological content. One important, partially-surviving work is Duyizhi by Li Rong.

===== Song dynasty =====
Surviving Song dynasty literature informative on Chinese mythology includes the encyclopedic work known as Taiping Yulan.

==== Vernacular novels and new media ====
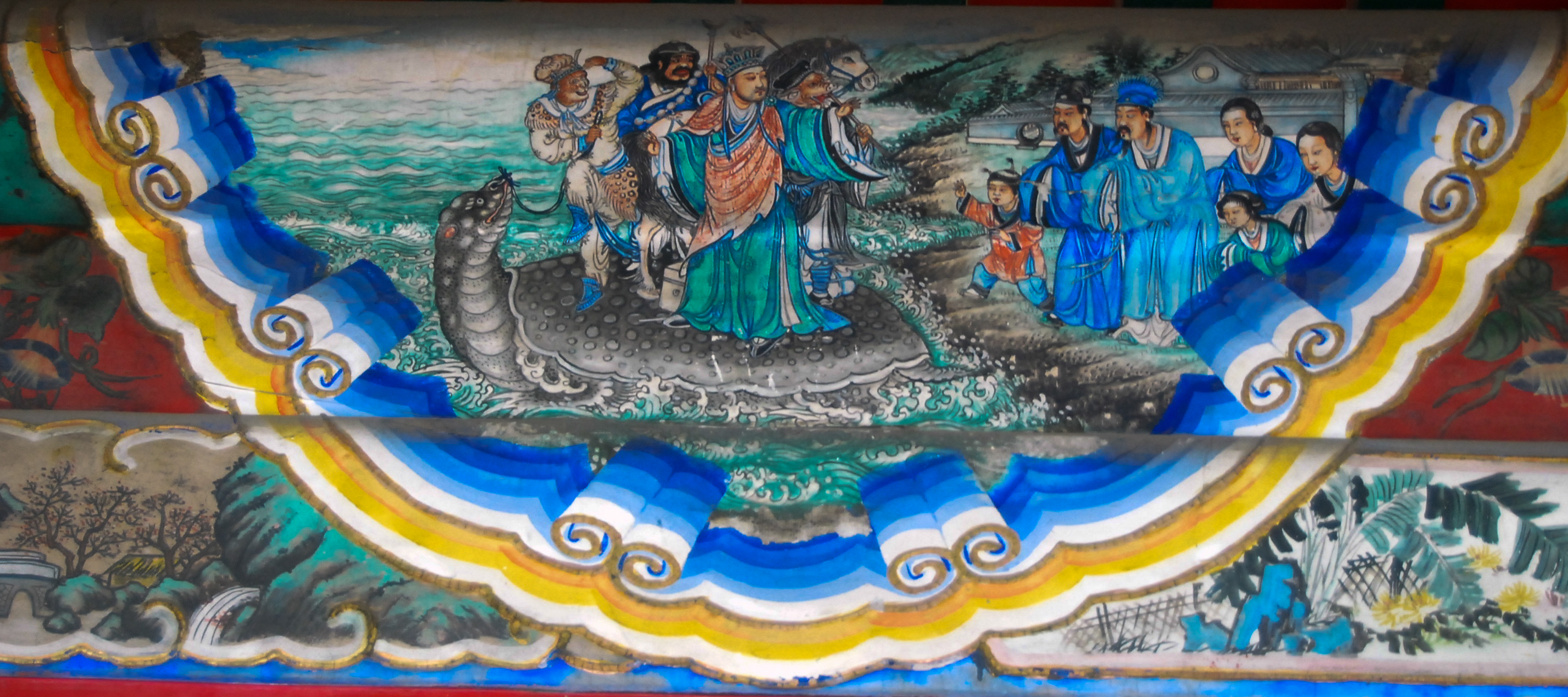
Xuanzang, Monkey King, and companions riding mythological turtle across a river as depicted on a Long Corridor mural, Beijing, China

Some myths were passed down through oral traditions literature, and art, such as theater and song before being recorded as novels. One example is Epic of Darkness. Books in the shenmo genre of vernacular fiction revolve around gods and monsters. Important mythological fiction which allude to these myths, include Fengshen Bang (Investiture of the Gods), a mythological fiction dealing with the founding of the Zhou dynasty; Journey to the West attributed to Wu Cheng'en, published in the 1590s, a fictionalized account of the pilgrimage of Xuanzang to India to obtain Buddhist religious texts in which the main character and his companions such as Sun Wukong encounter ghosts, monsters, and demons, as well as the Flaming Mountains; and, Baishe Zhuan (Madame White Snake), a romantic tale set in Hangzhou involving a female snake who attained human form and fell in love with a man. Strange Tales from a Chinese Studio, by Pu Songling contains many stories of fox spirits, and other phenomena. Another example is Zi Bu Yu, a collection of supernatural stories compiled during the Qing dynasty.

==== Literary genres ====
Certain genres of literature are notable for dealing with themes from mythology or tales of the supernatural; for example, the Zhiguai (誌怪) literary genre that deals with strange (mostly supernatural) events and stories.

==== India ====
The literature of India contains material about Chinese mythology, due to the influence of textual sources imported into China, and translated into Chinese and the ideas widely adopted by Chinese people. This was primarily in regard to Buddhist texts, containing Buddhist mythology from the area in and around the area now known as India. Some Hindu material may have been more directly imported.

== Comparative mythology ==
Many insights have developed through the examination of Chinese mythology as part of the field of comparative mythology, which is the comparison of myths from different cultures in order to identify shared themes, motifs, or other features. Early exponents of comparative mythology which are informative to the study of Chinese mythology include Georges Dumézil and James Frazer.

Ancient Chinese myths from various family and people groups survived for hundreds of years after they were first told and were integrated into Chinese Manichaeism.

== In popular culture ==
Thousands of years of the development of Chinese mythology has resulted in Chinese mythology in popular culture, in the sense of popular culture affected or inspired by this tradition. This includes television shows, cinema, and video games. Also, many of the vehicles associated with the modern Chinese space program are named after mythology, such as the lunar explorer Chang'e 4 that achieved the first soft landing on the far side of the Moon, on 3 January 2019, and named after the lunar goddess Chang'e associated and with a communications relay satellite Queqiao, named after the lovers bridge over the Milky Way formed by magpies.

== See also ==
- Celestial bureaucracy
- Chinese astrology
- Chinese creation myth
- Chinese folklore
- Chinese folk religion
- Chinese legendary creatures
- Chinese spiritual world concepts
- Cicada#In human culture
- Dance of China
- I Ching
- Imperial examination in Chinese mythology
- List of Chinese mythology: a list version of this article
- List of deities
- Lo Shu Square
- Music of China
- Panhu
- Sanxing (deities)
- Shen (Chinese religion)
- Simians (Chinese poetry)
- Teng
- Trees in Chinese mythology
- Weapons and armor in Chinese mythology
- Yuan Ke
- Japanese mythology

== Sources ==
- Barrett, T. H. (2008). The Woman Who Discovered Printing. New Haven: Yale University Press. ISBN 978-0-300-12728-7.
- Birrell, Anne (1993). Chinese Mythology. Baltimore: Johns Hopkins. ISBN 0-8018-6183-7.
- Christie, Anthony (1968). Chinese Mythology. Feltham: Hamlyn Publishing. ISBN 0-600-00637-9.
- Eberhard, Wolfram (2003) [1986]. A Dictionary of Chinese Symbols: Hidden Symbols in Chinese Life and Thought. London, New York: Routledge. ISBN 0-415-00228-1.
- Ferguson, John C. (1928). "China". Mythology of All Races. Vol. VIII. Archaeological Institute of America – via archive.org.
- Hawkes, David (2011) [1985]. The Songs of the South: An Ancient Chinese Anthology of Poems by Qu Yuan and Other Poets. London, England: Penguin Books. ISBN 978-0-14-044375-2.
- Latourette, Kenneth Scott (1947). The Chinese: Their History and Culture (3rd Revised ed.). New York: Macmillan.
- Legge, James (1963) [1899]. The I Ching: The Book of Changes Second Edition. New York: Dover. LCCN 63-19508.
- Paludan, Ann (1998). Chronicle of the Chinese Emperors: The Reign-by-Reign Record of the Rulers of Imperial China. New York, NY: Thames and Hudson. ISBN 0-500-05090-2.
- Paper, Jordan D. (1995). The Spirits are Drunk: Comparative Approaches to Chinese Religion. Albany, NY: State University of New York Press. ISBN 0-7914-2315-8.
- Schafer, Edward H. (1963). The Golden Peaches of Samarkand. Berkeley, CA: University of California Press.
- Sheppard, Odell (1930). The Lore of the Unicorn — Myths and Legends. London: Random House UK. ISBN 0-09-185135-1.
- Siu, R. G. H. (1968). ""Preface" and "Introduction"". The Man of Many Qualities: A Legacy of the I Ching. Cambridge: Michigan Institute of Technology Press. LCCN 68-18242.
- Strassberg, Richard E., ed. (2018) [2002]. A Chinese Bestiary: Strange Creatures from the GUIDEWAYS THROUGH MOUNTAINS AND SEAS. Berkeley and Los Angeles, CA: University of California Press. ISBN 978-0-520-29851-4.
- Werner, E.T.C. (1922). Myths and Legends of China. New York: George G. Harrap & Co. Ltd.
- Wu, K. C. (1982). The Chinese Heritage. New York, CA: Crown Publishers. ISBN 0-517-54475X.
- Yang, Lihui; An, Deming; Turner, Jessica Anderson (2005). Handbook of Chinese Mythology. New York, NY: Oxford University Press. ISBN 978-0-19-533263-6.
