= List of legendary creatures from China =

The following is a list of legendary creatures recorded from Chinese mythology.

== A ==
The Azure Dragon is depicted on the flag of the Qing Dynasty.

- Ao, a mythological tortoise who has a burning shell and cheeks with magma on them.
- Azure Dragon, also called Qinglong, a dragon that represents the cardinal point East and Spring.

== B ==
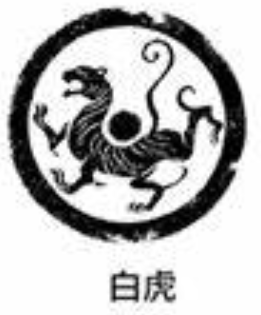
Baihu

- Bai Ze, a cow-like monster with a human head, six horns and nine eyes.
- Baihu
- Bai Suzhen
- Bailongma
- Bashe, a python-like snake that ate elephants.
- Bifang, a crane-like bird with only one foot that is accompanied by strange fires
- Bixi, a dragon with the shell of a turtle.
- Birds in Chinese mythology
- Biyiniao, birds with one eye and one wing each, that must attach to each other and fly in pairs.
- Black Tortoise, a turtle that represents the cardinal point North and Winter.

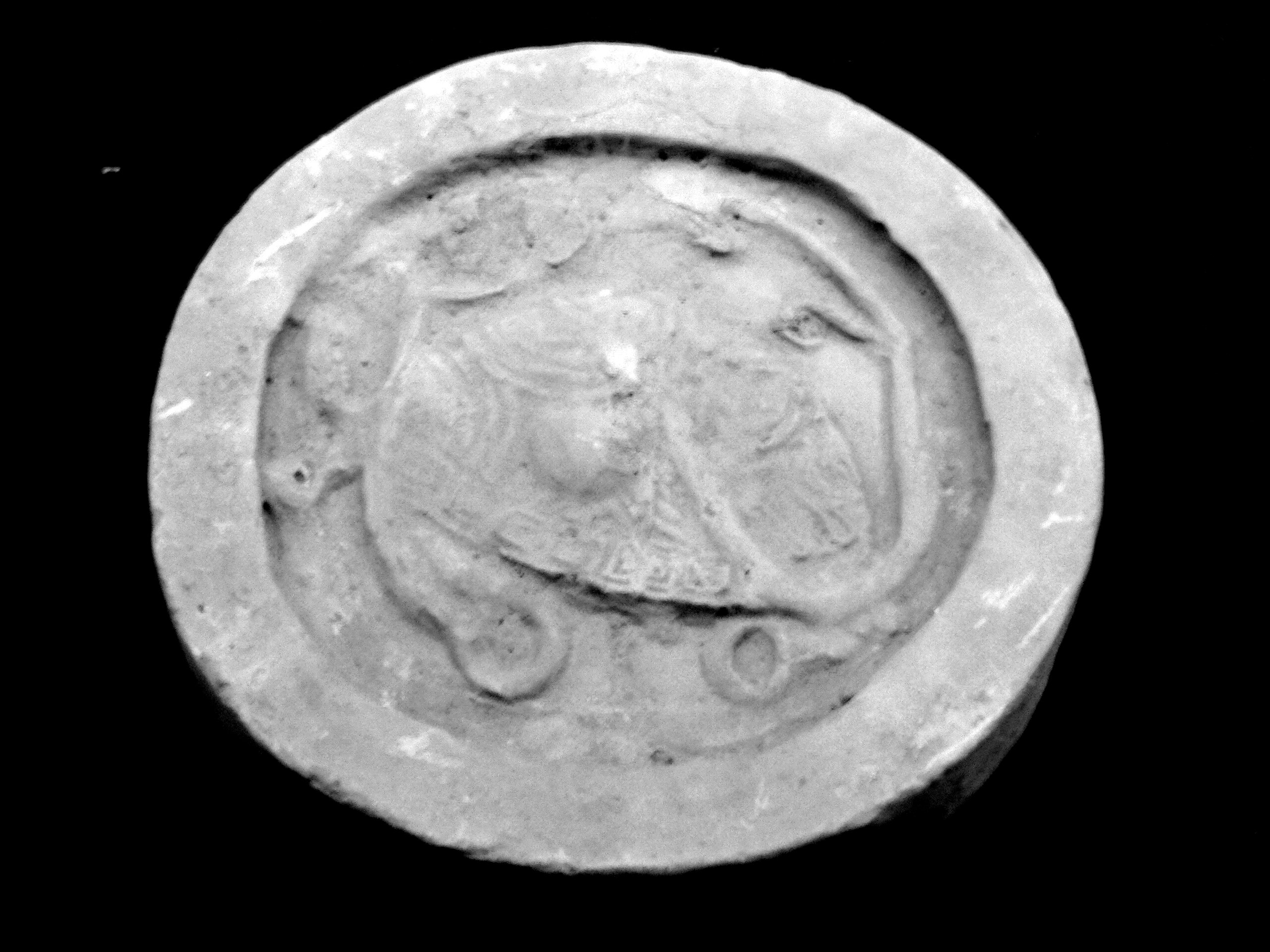
The Black Tortoise

- Bo beast, a horse-like beast with one horn that eats tigers and leopards.
- Bovidae in Chinese mythology
- Boyi, a sheep-like beast with nine tails and four ears and eyes on its back. A man who wears fur of boyi will have no fear.

== C ==
- Canshen
- Chi (mythology), a hornless dragon.
- Chinese guardian lions, traditional architectural ornaments.

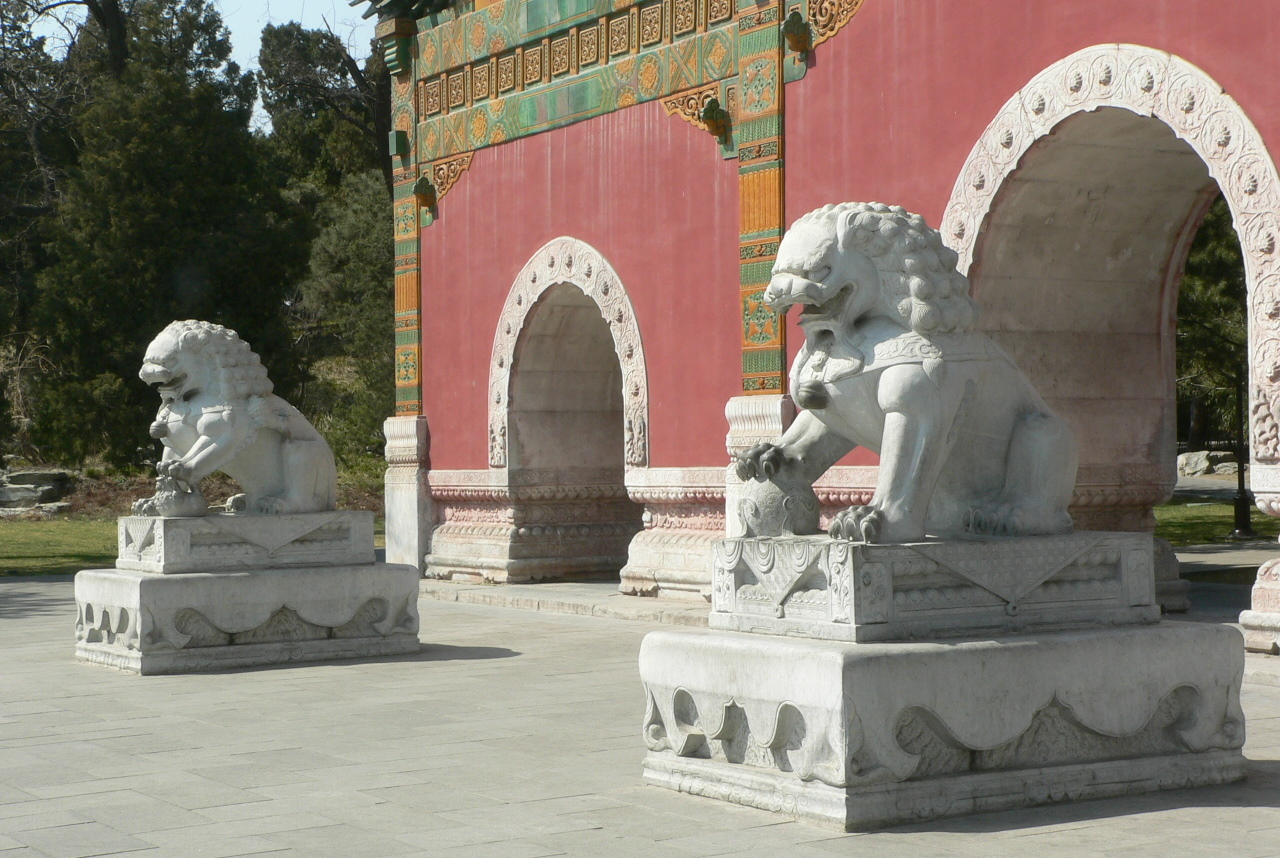
Guardian lions in Beijing

- Chinese dragon

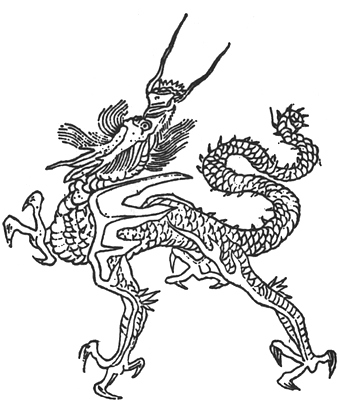
Chinese dragon from around the 17th century.

- Chituma, steed of General Lü Bu.
- Chiwen, a dragon that protects against fires, floods, and typhoons.
- Crane in Chinese mythology

== D ==
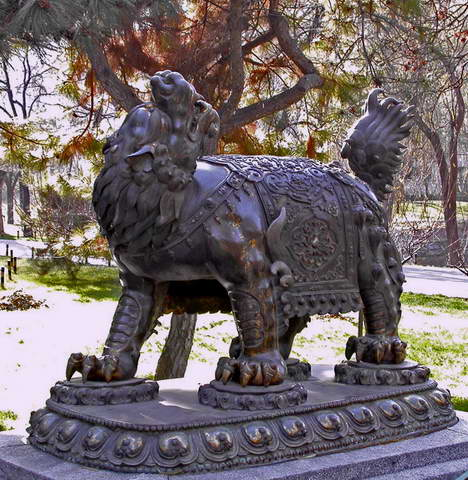
A Denglong

- Denglong, a mythical creature that acts as messenger between heaven and earth.
- Dilong
- Diting, a mythical dog-like creature with the ability to differentiate between truth and falsehood with its ears.
- Dog in Chinese mythology
- Dragon (zodiac)
- Dragon King
- Dragon turtle, mythical creature with head of a dragon and body of a tortoise which symbolises courage, power, and success.

== F ==
- Feng (mythology), an edible monster that resembles a two-eyed lump of meat and magically grows back as fast as it is eaten.
- Fenghuang, Chinese phoenix

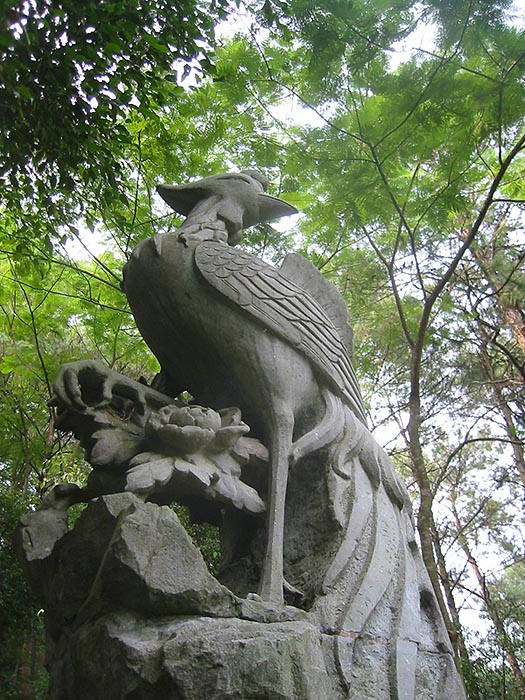
Fenghuang

- Feilian, god of the wind who is a winged dragon with the head of a deer and tail of a snake.
- Feilong, winged legendary creature that flies among clouds.
- Fish in Chinese mythology
- Four Perils
- Four Symbols, also called Sixiang, four legendary animals that represent the points of the compass.
- Fox spirit, a famous mythological fox-like creature. Also called huli jing, huyao, huxian, or huzu.

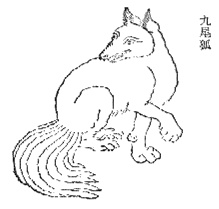
A Hulijing

- Fuzhu, a Chinese deer with four horns, possessing a gentle countenance, a likeness to be clean, and usually appears during periods of flood.
- Fuzanglong, the dragon of hidden treasures.

== H ==
- Hong (rainbow-dragon), two headed rainbow serpent.
- Huan beast, a cat-like beast with only one eye and three tails with the sound of the chirping of hundreds of animals
- Huli jing, see Fox Spirit.
- Hundun
- Huodou, a huge black dog that emits fire from its mouth.
- Hou, a powerful and ferocious beast, frequently depicted as a wolf-like or dragon-dog hybrid, famous as the mount for the bodhisattva Guanyin.

== J ==
- Jiangshi, a hopping vampire.
- Jiaolong, a hornless scaled dragon.
- Jin Chan, a prosperity frog.
- Jingwei, a bird who is determined to dry up the sea. It was morphed from a girl who drowned in the sea.
- Jiufeng or Nine-headed Bird, an earlier version of the Fenghuang.
- Jinnalaluo, divine creatures with human bodies and animal heads.
- Jiuweihu, Nine-tailed fox
- Jueyuan (mythology), creatures that look similar to monkeys.

== K ==
- Kalaviṅka, creatures with a human head and a bird's torso, with long flowing tail.
- Kui (Chinese mythology)

== L ==
- Lake Tianchi Monster
- Linggui, a spirit turtle, chief of all shelled creatures.
- Longma, a winged horse with dragon scales.
- Longmu
- Luan (mythology), a bird which carries a shield and tramples on snakes while wearing one on its breast.
- Luduan, a deer with green coat, horse tail, and one horn which can travel 18,000 li in a single day and speaks all world languages.
- Lushu, a white headed horse with markings on its body like a tiger, a red tail, and a neigh like people singing folk songs.

== M ==
- Mo (Chinese zoology)
- Mogwai (Chinese culture), evil spirits who reproduces during mating seasons triggered by the coming of rain.
- Moon rabbit, a mythical figure who is a companion of Chang'E and pounds the elixir of life constantly for her.

== N ==
- Nian, a beast related to the Chinese New Year.
- Nine-headed Bird, see Jiufeng and Fenghuang.
- Nine sons of the Dragon

== O ==
- Ox-Head and Horse-Face, two guardians of the underworld.

== P ==
- Panhu, a dog who transformed into a man.
- Pangu, a primitive, hairy giant with horns on his head.
- Panlong (mythology), an aquatic dragon.
- Peng (mythology), a mystical giant bird of the ocean.
- Penghou, a tree spirit.
- Pixiu, strong winged lions that protect Fengshui practitioners.
- Pig dragon
- Pulao (dragon)

== Q ==
- Qilin, a hooved dragon-like creature with antlers and the body of an ox, deer, or horse.

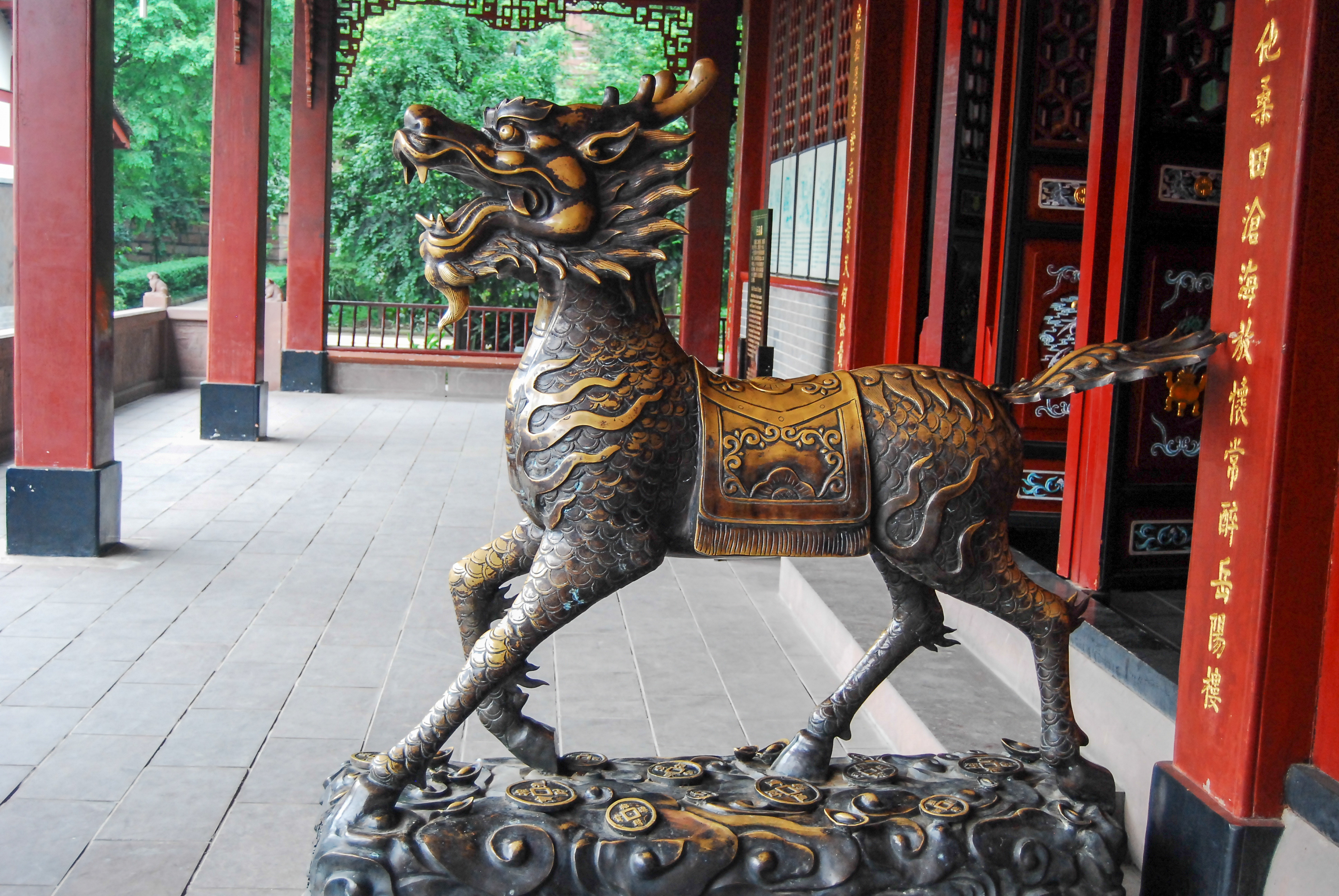
Qilin at Qingyang Palace

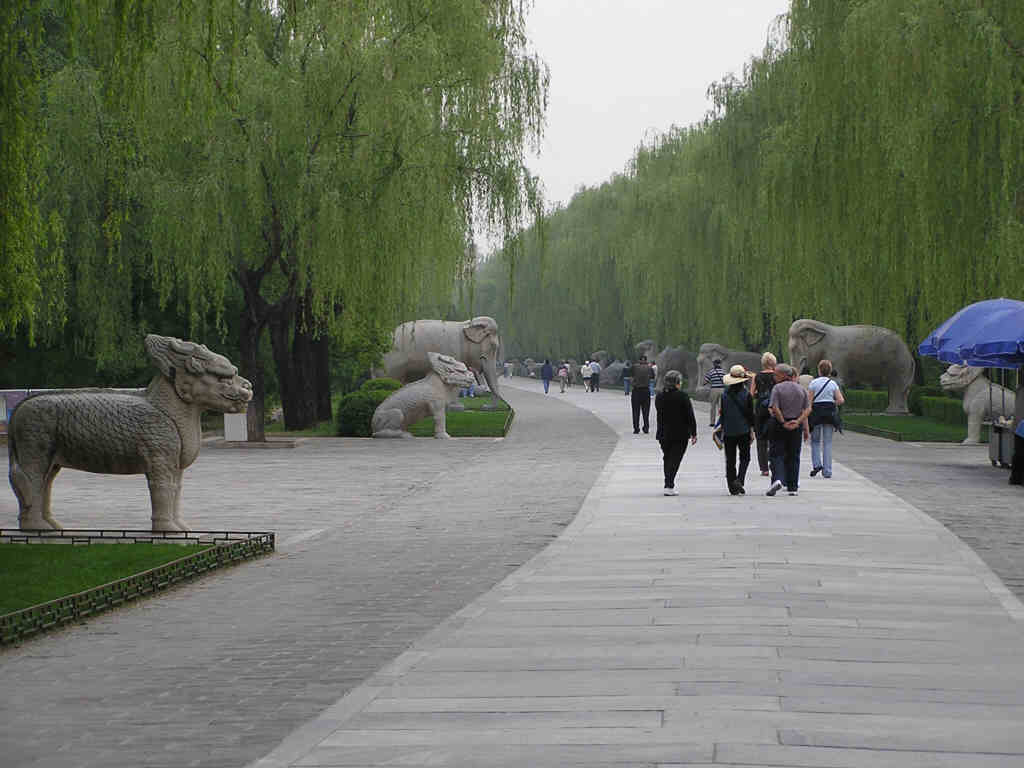
Qilins and Elephants at a Spirit Way

- Qianlima, a winged horse that can run a thousand miles at a step.
- Qingniao, messenger birds of the Queen Mother of the West.
- Qiongqi, a winged tiger, one of the Four Perils.
- Qitu beast, a crow-like bird with three heads and six tails and likes to laugh like a human being.
- Qiulong

== R ==
- Ranyi fish, a snake-like fish with the head of a snake, six legs, and eyes like the ears of a horse. Eating one made people sleep without nightmares and protect one from evil.
- Ruishi, Chinese guardian lions.

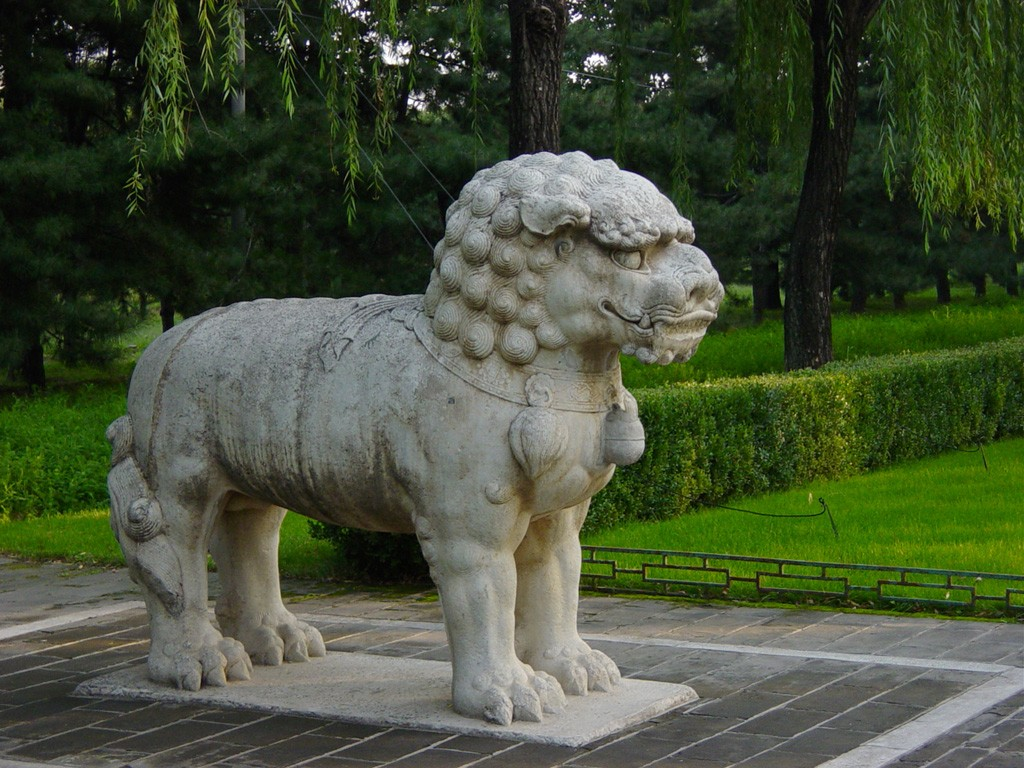
Ming Dynasty era stone lion

== S ==
- Shen (clam-monster)
- Shenlong, a dragon who is the master of storms and also a bringer of rain.
- Shennong
- Shōjō
- Shuhu beast, a wild beast with a horse's body and bird's wings, a human's face and a snake's tail. It likes to hug and lift people up.
- Shuihu, a water tiger.
- Sky Fox (mythology), a golden Hulijing that has reached 1000 years of age.
- Sun Wukong, a fire monkey with a golden rod also the Monkey King.

== T ==
- Taotie, a fiendish creature known for its greediness.
- Taowu, a stubborn, rambunctious beast.
- Tenghuang, a fox with horns on its back or a horse-like creature.
- Teng (mythology), a flying dragon.
- Three-legged crow, also known as Jinwu or Taiyang Shenniao

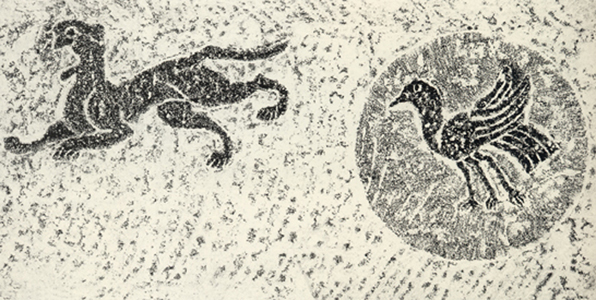
Three legged crow in a Mural from the Han Dynasty

- Tiangou, a dog which eats the moon, resulting in an eclipse.
- Tianma, a heavenly horse.

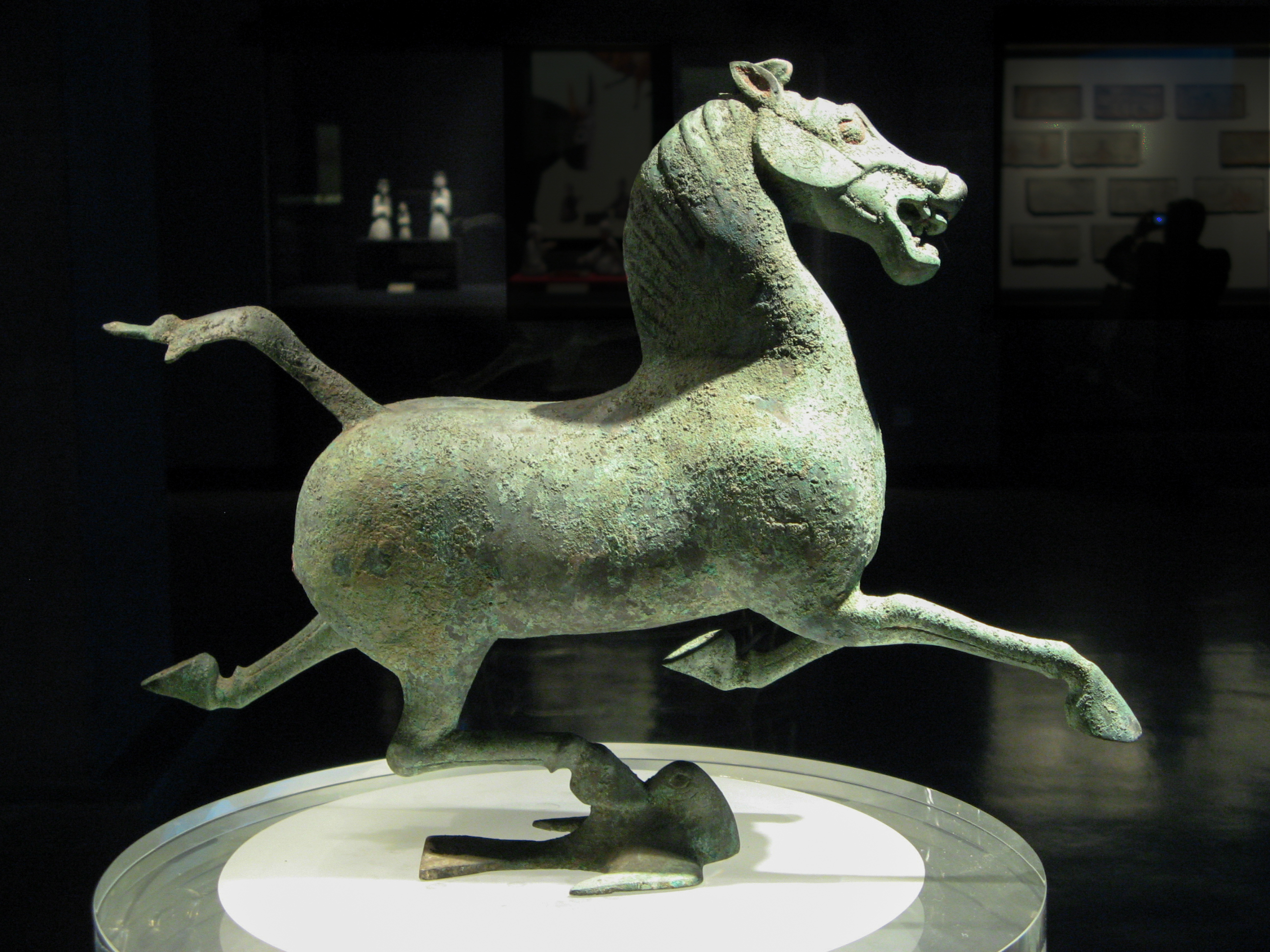
Statue of a heavenly horse (Tianma)

- Tianlong
- Tiger in Chinese culture

== W ==
- Wangliang
- White Tiger (mythology), also known as Baihu, a white tiger which symbolises the direction West and the season autumn.

== X ==
- Xiangliu, venomous nine-headed snake-like monster that brings floods and destruction.
- Xiao (mythology), name for multiple types of mythical creatures.
- Xiaotianquan, a mythological dog.
- Xiezhi, a creature which symbolises justice.
- Xingtian

== Y ==
- Yaoguai
- Yinglong
- Yeren
- Yong, an owl-like bird with a human face and four eyes and ears. Its cry was the pronunciation of its own name, and when it appeared there was a great drought in the world.

== Z ==
- Zhenniao, a legendary bird with poisonous feathers.
- Zhulong (mythology), a giant red solar dragon and god.
- Zhuque, a Vermilion Bird, one of the Four Symbols of the Chinese constellations.
- Zouyu a precious beast as big as a tiger, with five colors and a tail longer than its body known for travelling 1000 li per day

== See also ==
- List of Chinese mythology
- Chinese deities
- Chinese gods and immortals
- Chinese mythology
- Korean mythology
- List of legendary creatures from Japan
