= Manman =

Manman may refer to:

- Manman (software), a family of Enterprise resource planning software
- Manman Brijit, Vodou goddess
- Man Man, a band from Philadelphia, Pennsylvania
- Alondes Williams, an American basketball player, nicknamed "ManMan"
- Biyiniao, a bird from Chinese mythology
