= Three-legged turtle =

Three-legged turtle (simplified Chinese: 三足龟; traditional Chinese: 三足龜; pinyin: Sānzúguī) and Three-legged softshell turtle (simplified Chinese: 三足鳖; traditional Chinese: 三足鱉; pinyin: Sānzúbiē) are mythical turtles from China.

According to the ancient dictionary Erya, the former (pertaining to hardshell turtles including tortoises) is properly called Fen (simplified Chinese: 贲; traditional Chinese: 賁; pinyin: Fén), and the latter, Nai (Chinese: 能; pinyin: Nái).

== Descriptions ==
From the ancient text Classic of Mountains and Seas (trans. Anne Birrell):

...On the south face of Mount Bigbitter the River Mad rises and flows southwest to empty into the River Person. Three-footed turtles are numerous in the River Mad. Those who eat it won't have a serious illness, and it can be taken to cure a swelling.

— Book Five, The Classic of the Central Mountains, Chapter 7.

...The River Trailer rises on its summit and runs a hidden course to its base. This river contains many three-footed [softshell] turtles with a branching tail. If you eat it, you won't succumb to the plague of the malign force.

— Book Five, The Classic of the Central Mountains, Chapter 11.

Guo Pu (276–324) noted that they were in his times also found in Junshan Lake (君山池) in Yangxian County (陽羨縣, approximately modern Yixing).

The morbid zhiguai tale "Three-legged Softshell Turtles" by the Ming dynasty writer Lu Can (1494–1551), from his collection Gengsi Bian (庚巳編), contradicts the Classic's dietary advice. One summer day in 1510, in the county of Taicang, a man bought a softshell turtle with three feet from a group of fishermen. His wife slaughtered and cooked the turtle, and the man ate the dish alone before going to sit outside. When she went to check on him, she saw only his clothes and a pile of hair, but he was nowhere to be seen. The village head suspected foul play and had her taken to the yamen for interrogation. The county magistrate, Huang Tingxuan, could not make sense of it so he threw her in prison and ordered the fishermen to catch another three-legged softshell turtle or face consequences. When after a few days, another creature was caught, Huang made the wife cook the turtle in the same way and had a felon eat it. The felon also disappeared—minus his clothes and hair—so Huang released the woman. The fishermen then told him their story: Their first catch after receiving his order was something extremely heavy. When they dragged it to shore, they saw that it looked like a limbless human with all facial features intact; the eyes were closed but the body was shifting awkwardly. The terrified fishermen threw the monster back into the Yangtze, went to another location, and caught an identical-looking creature. Thereupon they prayed to the river god with sacrificial items and begged for help meeting Huang's deadline. On the third attempt, they caught the three-legged turtle that they brought in, but they did not know what it was that they caught before.

== Possible significance ==
Gun, the father of Yu the Great and a key figure in the myth of the Great Flood, transformed himself into a yellow animal after his execution on Feather Mountain. The animal was either a bear (熊) or a nai (能, "three-legged softshell turtle" according to Erya). Maxime Kaltenmark writes (trans. Gerald Honigsblum):

...it is unclear whether this animal was a bear or a turtle. As this animal went into some kind of hole, chances are it was a turtle, although the reading of "bear" is not impossible, since Yu can change into a bear at any given moment. The etymology of their names, however, suggests that Gun and Yu were aquatic animals.

Sarah Allan notes that Gun's status as a three-legged turtle makes him "a counterpart for the three-legged sun-bird of the Shang".

Sarah Allan also speculates that the origin of the three-legged turtle may be related to the legends of Nüwa, who, according to Huainanzi, cut off four legs of an Ao-turtle to support the corners of the sky, when in fact, "if only Bu Zhou Mountain were broken as in other versions of the myth, only one leg would have been needed to prop up the sky."

== See also ==
- Limb development
- Three-legged crow
