= Fuzhu =

Fuzhu may refer to:

- Fuzhu (food) (Chinese: 腐竹), an Asian dish prepared from tofu
- Fuzhu (mythical beast) (Chinese: 夫諸), a mythical beast in ancient Chinese myths and legends
