= Birds in Chinese mythology =

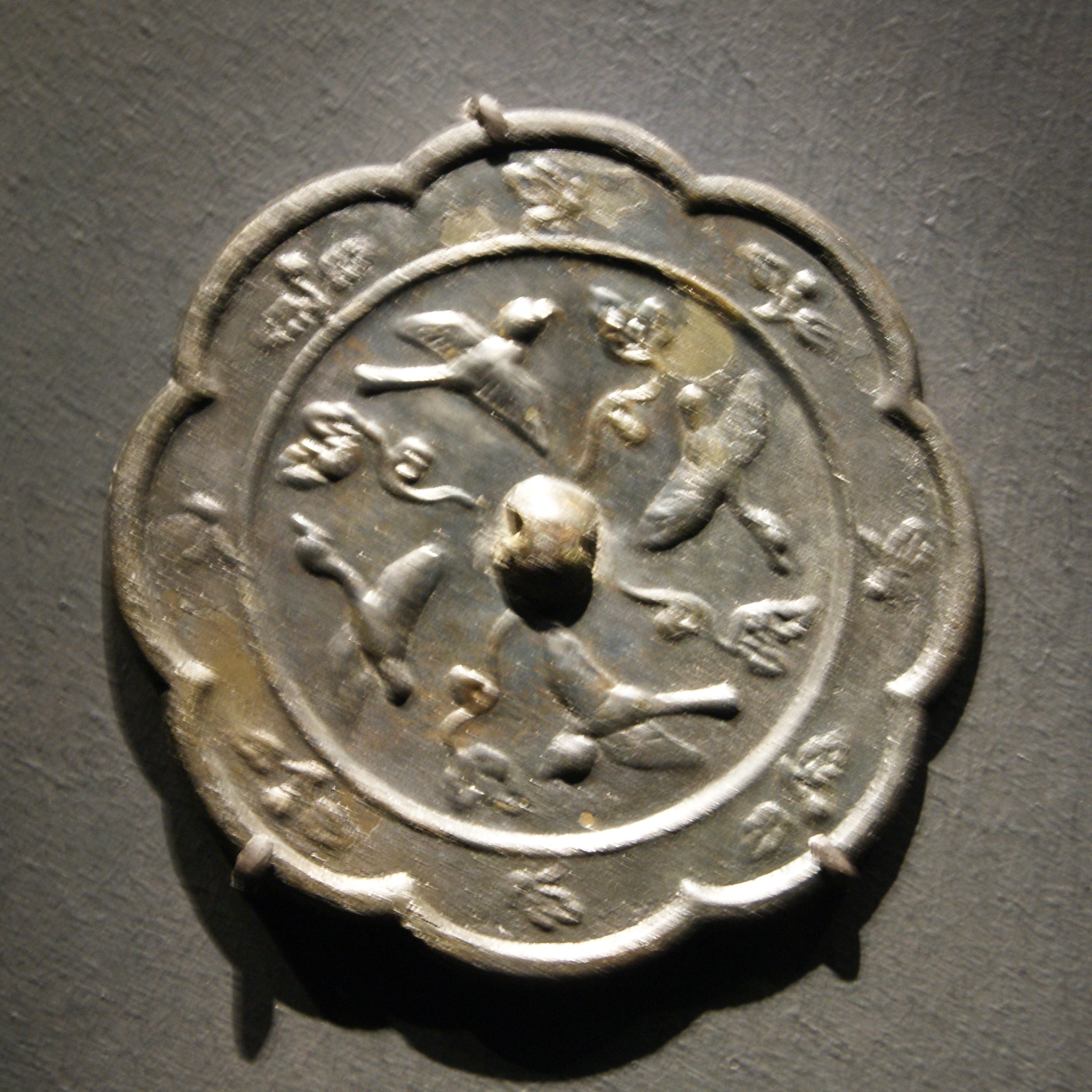
Decorative back of bronze mirror, with birds, from the Belitung shipwreck.

Birds in Chinese mythology and legend are of numerous types and very important in this regard. Some of them are obviously based on real birds, other ones obviously not, and some in-between. The crane is an example of a real type of bird with mythological enhancements. Cranes are linked with immortality, and may be transformed xian immortals, or ferry an immortal upon their back. The Vermilion Bird is iconic of the south. Sometimes confused with the Fenghuang, the Vermilion Bird of the south is associated with fire. The Peng was a gigantic bird phase of the gigantic Kun fish. The Jingwei is a mythical bird which tries to fill up the ocean with twigs and pebbles symbolizing indefatigable determination. The Qingniao was the messenger or servant of Xi Wangmu.

== Names and translation ==
Written and spoken Chinese varieties have different character graphs and sounds representing mythological and legendary birds of China.

Bronze script version of the character niǎo (鳥))

The character zhuī, in Large seal script

The Chinese characters or graphs used have varied over time calligraphically or typologically. Historically main generic characters for bird are niǎo (鸟; 鳥) and the other main "bird" word / character graph zhuī (隹). Many specific characters are based on these two radicals; in other words, incorporating one or the other radical as constituent to a more complex character graph, for example in the case of the Peng bird (鹏; 鵬): in both cases, a version of the niǎo character is radicalized on the right.

Modern pronunciations vary and the ancient ones are not fully recoverable. Sometimes the Chinese terms for mythological or legendary birds include a generic term for "bird" appended to the pronounced name for "bird"; an example would be the Zhenniao, which is also known just as Zhen: the combination of Zhen plus niao means "Zhen bird"; thus, "Zhenniao" is the same as "Zhen bird", or just "Zhen".

Translation into English language of Chinese terms for legendary and mythological birds is difficult, especially considering that even in Chinese there is a certain amount of obscurity. In some cases, the classical Chinese term is obviously a descriptive term. In other cases, the classical Chinese term is clearly based on the alleged sound of said bird; that is, what is known as onomatopoeia. However, often, it's not so simple.

== Auspicious birds ==
Very auspicious birds include the Feng, the Fenghuang, and the Luan.

== Symbolically representative birds ==
Some birds in Chinese legend and mythology symbolize or represent various concepts of a more-or-less abstract nature.

The Zhuque or Vermilion Bird symbolically represents the cardinal direction south. It is red and associated with the wu xing "element" fire.

The Jingwei bird represents determination and persistence, even in the face of seemingly over-whelming odds.

Some birds may function as totems or representative symbols of clans or other social groups.

The Biyiniao is an important bird to Chinese mythology symbolism, the picture and symbolism for this bird differs throughout the regions in china. In certain rural communities, the Biyiniao is not only a symbol of unity but also an emblem associated with agricultural prosperity and communal wellbeing. It's also sometimes incorporated the image of a linked wing bird or talisman for good fortune.

== Associated birds ==
Some birds are associated with other mythological content.

A three-legged bird or birds are a solar motif. Sometimes depicted as a Three-legged crow known as either the Jinwu or Sanzuwu.

The Qingniao is associated with the Queen Mother of the West, bearing her messages or bringing her food.

Some birds feature as part of visions of the mythological geography of China. According to the Shanhaijing and its commentaries, the Bifang can be found on Mount Zhang'e and/or east of the Feathered People (Youmin) and west of the Blue River.

The Black-naped Oriole, represents "joy, music and a happy marriage".

== Transportation ==
Certain birds in mythology transport deities, immortals, or others. One example is the Crane in Chinese mythology.

== Various birds ==
There is classification of birds within their mythology. The four classifications are normal, alien/ extraordinary, human- hybrid, and others/ mixed formed birds. Normal birds are named by bird's physical characteristics belonged to the birds in a biological sense. Alien birds are like common birds but are a different shape with different organs. human- hybrid are just human faces on bird body's, there was a god with a human face and bird body that had two yellow snake hanging ears to wear and feet that trampled trample two yellow snakes. other and mixed birds have no specific descriptions only their locations. in the other birds category its includes the Bi Fang bird, a one-legged bird. Bi is also number nineteen of the Twenty-Eight Mansions of traditional Chinese astronomy, the Net (Bi). There are supposed to be the Jiān (鶼; jian^{1}): the mythical one-eyed bird with one wing; Jianjian (鶼鶼): a pair of such birds dependent on each other, inseparable, hence representing husband and wife. There was a Shang-Yang rainbird. The Jiufeng is a nine-headed bird used to scare children. The Sù Shuāng (鷫鷞; su^{4}shuang^{3}) sometimes appears as a goose-like bird. The Zhen is a poisonous bird. There may be a Jiguang (吉光; jíguāng).

== Real birds ==
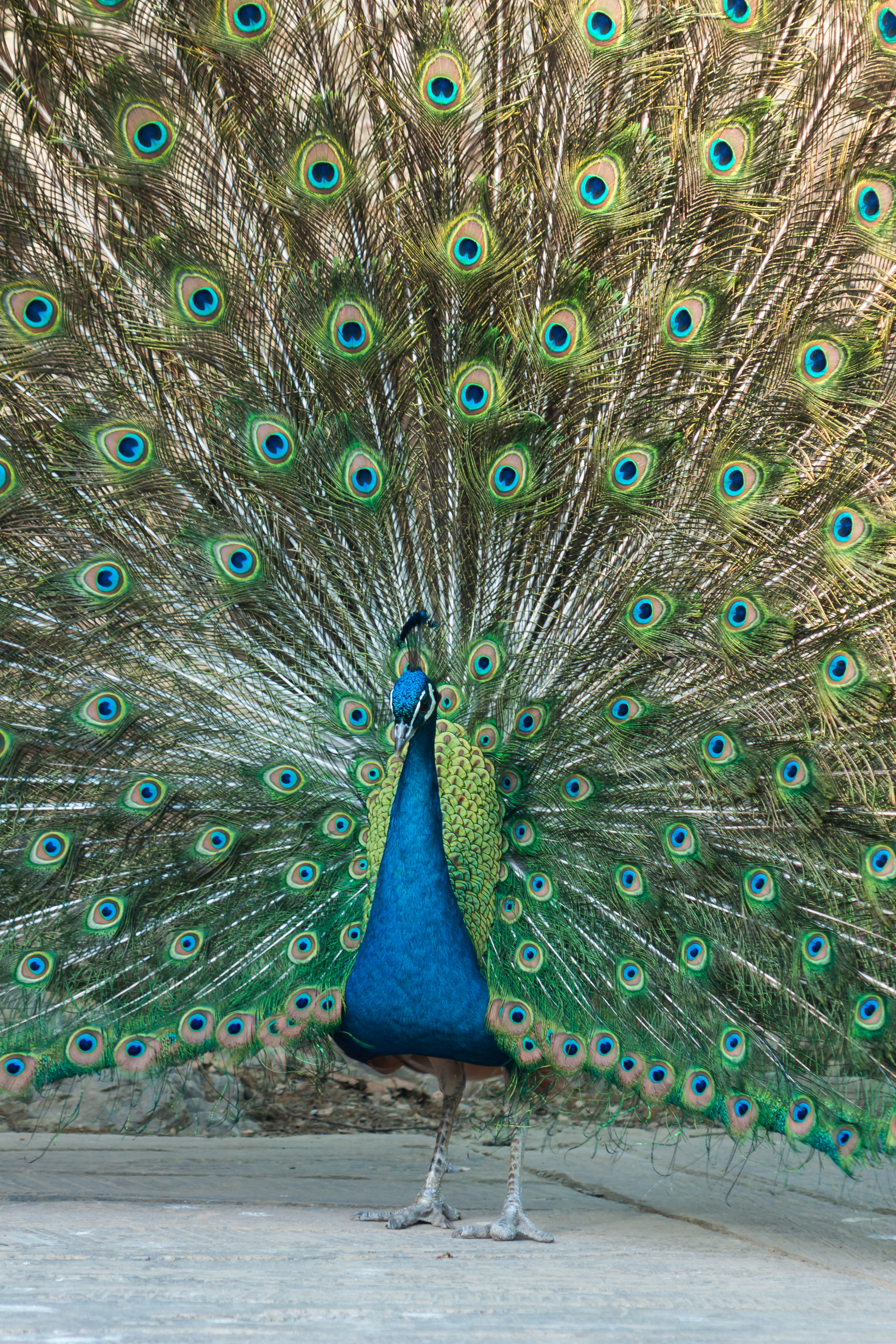
Dalian, Liaoning, China: An example of a real bird: a peacock of the family Phasianidae, in the "Singing Birds' Forest" (鸟语林)

The line between fantastic, mythological, or legendary birds and actually real exotic birds is sometimes blurred. Sometimes, the student of the real versus the unreal becomes challenged.

== Sources ==
Various sources for information on Chinese legends and mythology about bird. This includes the Shanhaijing. Also, "Questions to Heaven".

== See also ==
=== Main article ===
- Chinese mythology

=== Relevant categories ===
- Category:Birds in mythology
- Category:Legendary birds
- Category:Birds in Chinese mythology

=== Related ===
- Geese in Chinese poetry

== Sources ==
- Christie, Anthony (1968). Chinese Mythology. Feltham: Hamlyn Publishing. ISBN 0600006379.
- Ferguson, John C. (1928). "China". Mythology of All Races. Vol. VIII. Archaeological Institute of America.
- Hawkes, David, translator and introduction (2011 [1985]). Qu Yuan et al., The Songs of the South: An Ancient Chinese Anthology of Poems by Qu Yuan and Other Poets. London: Penguin Books. ISBN 978-0-14-044375-2
- Schafer, Edward H. (1963) The Golden Peaches of Samarkand. Berkeley: University of California Press.
- Strassberg, Richard E. (2002). A Chinese Bestiary: Strange Creatures from the GUIDEWAYS THROUGH MOUNTAINS AND SEAS. Berkeley and Los Angeles: University of California Press. ISBN 978-0-520-29851-4.
- Wu, K. C. (1982). The Chinese Heritage. New York: Crown Publishers. ISBN 0-517-54475X.
- Yang, Lihui; An, Deming (2005). Handbook of Chinese Mythology. with Jessica Anderson Turner. New York: Oxford University Press. ISBN 978-0-19-533263-6.
- Yi, S., Wang, J., & Han, B. (2023). Research on the bird image in Shanhai Jing. Journal of Education, Humanities and Social Sciences, 15(308–313). (PDF) Research on the bird image in Shanhai Jing
- Mythological Creatures Team. (2025, May). Biyiniao: Symbol of conjugal love and unity; represents the essential bond between partners. Mythological Creatures. Biyiniao: Symbol of conjugal love and unity; represents the essential bond between partners. | Mythical Legend
