= Rooster (zodiac) =

Sign of the Chinese zodiac

- "Rooster, Chicken" in Traditional (top) and Simplified (bottom) Chinese characters
- Traditional Chinese: 雞
- Simplified Chinese: 鸡
Transcriptions
Standard Mandarin
- Hanyu Pinyin: jī
- Wade–Giles: chi^{1}
- IPA: [tɕí]
Hakka
- Romanization: kiê
Yue: Cantonese
- Yale Romanization: gāi
- Jyutping: gai1
- IPA: [kɐj˥]
Southern Min
- Hokkien POJ: ke / koe
Eastern Min
- Fuzhou BUC: giĕ
Northern Min
- Jian'ou Romanized: gái
Old Chinese
- Baxter (1992): *ke
- Baxter–Sagart (2014): *kˤe

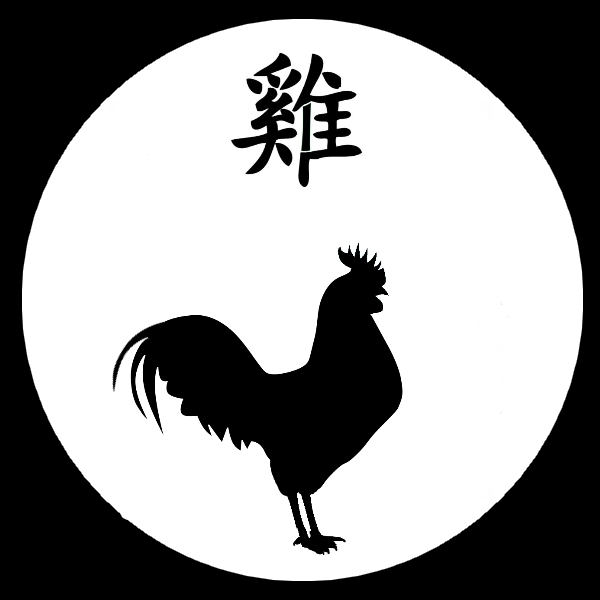
Zodiac rooster, showing the jī (雞) character for rooster

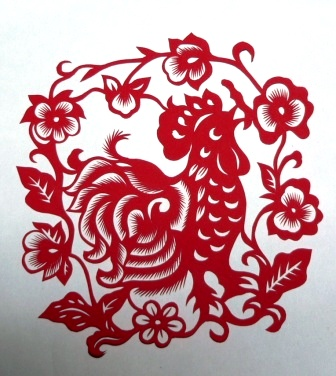
Chinese paper cutting

The Rooster (simplified Chinese: 鸡; traditional Chinese: 雞/鷄) or Chicken, is the tenth of the 12-year cycle of animals which appear in the Chinese zodiac related to the Chinese calendar. The Year of the Rooster is represented by the Earthly Branch symbol 酉.

In the Tibetan zodiac and the Gurung zodiac, the bird is in place of the Rooster.

== Years and the five elements ==
People born within these date ranges can be said to have been born in the "Year of the Rooster", while bearing the following elemental signs:

Start date	End date	Heavenly branch
26 January 1933	13 February 1934	Water Rooster
13 February 1945	1 February 1946	Wood Rooster
31 January 1957	17 February 1958	Fire Rooster
17 February 1969	5 February 1970	Earth Rooster
5 February 1981	24 January 1982	Metal Rooster
23 January 1993	9 February 1994	Water Rooster
9 February 2005	28 January 2006	Wood Rooster
28 January 2017	15 February 2018	Fire Rooster
13 February 2029	2 February 2030	Earth Rooster
1 February 2041	21 January 2042	Metal Rooster
19 February 2053	7 February 2054	Water Rooster
5 February 2065	25 January 2066	Wood Rooster
24 January 2077	11 February 2078	Fire Rooster
10 February 2089	29 January 2090	Earth Rooster
29 January 2101	16 February 2102	Metal Rooster

== Basic astrology elements ==
Earthly Branches:	酉 You
The Five Elements:	Metal
Direction:	West
Lunar Month:	September 6 to October 5
Yin Yang:	Yin
Lucky Numbers:	5, 7, 8; Avoid: 1, 3, 9
Lucky Flowers:	Gladiola, Cockscomb
Lucky Colors:	Brown, gold, yellow; Avoid: white, green
Season:	Autumn
Lucky/Associated Countries:	Poland, Saudi Arabia, Slovakia, Myanmar, Morocco, Canada

== See also ==
- Rooster
- Birds in Chinese mythology
- Fenghuang
