= Shangyang (rainbird) =

Mythological Chinese rainbird

The Shangyang (商羊), (or shang yang) in Chinese mythology was a rainbird (i.e. it could predict rain). It was one of several important mythical birds in this tradition. The Shangyang was particularly associated with the Lord of Rain, Yu Shi. Once, the Shangyang was said to have visited the royal court of Qi, where it danced on one leg. After seeing this, a delegation was sent to Confucius in the neighboring state of Lu to ask about the meaning of the event. Confucius, who was familiar with the Shangyang, predicted heavy rain and advised the people to dig drainage channels and build dikes. By following the sage's advice, Qi avoided the disaster caused by a subsequent flood, while other states that ignored this advice were heavily damaged. This legendary incident has often been used to illustrate the foolishness of those who ignore wise advice. Mythographer Lihui Yang associates Yu Shi with the Bi Fang bird, instead.

== See also ==
- Chinese mythology
- Qingniao
- Three-legged crow
