= Zhenniao =

Poisonous birds in Chinese mythology

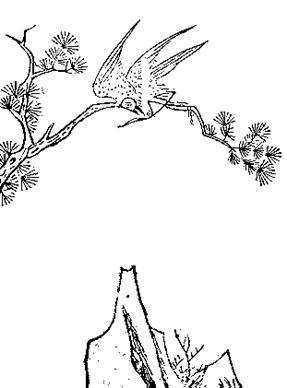
Woodblock print of the zhen from the Sancai Tuhui

Zhenniao (Chinese: 鴆鳥; pinyin: zhènniǎo; lit. 'poison-feather bird'), often simply zhen, is a name given in many Chinese myths, annals, and poetry to poisonous birds that are said to have existed in what is now southern China. The Classic of Mountains and Seas's fifth chapter, which relates details about the country's central mountains, describes the zhen as resembling an eagle, and lists it as living on Mount Nüji (女幾) in Lianyungang, Jiangsu, (Note: Also known as Mount Huaguo.) as well as on Mount Qingu (琴鼓), Jade Mountain, and Mount Yaobi (瑤碧)—all in southern China.

== Literary references ==
In Guo Pu's commentaries on the Classic of Mountains and Seas, he describes this bird as having a purple abdomen and green-tipped feathers, with a long neck and a scarlet beak. This bird acquires its poisonous attributes from devouring the heads of poisonous vipers. The male and female zhen are called 迴陽; huíyáng; 'revolving sun' and 陰氳; yīnyūn; 'Yin harmony', respectively.

More descriptions of zhen birds are found in Guo Yigong's Extensive Records (廣志; Guǎngzhì), written in the 3rd century CE, later lost, yet still quoted in the Guangyun and the Song-era Piya dictionary: in those works, the zhen is described as being goose-like, colored dark-purple, and having a beak 7–8 cun long and copper-colored; from its very veins to the tips of its feathers, the zhen's body is said to be tainted with a poison of unparalleled potency, referred to as 鴆毒; zhèndú. The zhen's feathers were often dipped into liquor to create a poisonous draught that was often used to carry out assassinations. Its meat, however, was said to be overtly toxic and gave off a gamy odor that rendered it inadequate for surreptitious use, and the zhen's excrement could dissolve stone. The zhen's poison was said to be so deadly that it needed only to pass through a person's throat to kill them. In the Baopuzi by Taoist adept Ge Hong, the only thing that was said to be able to neutralize the zhen's poison was the horn of the rhinoceros, which would be made into hairpins, foaming and neutralizing the poison when used to stir poisonous concoctions.

Aside from the Shanhaijing, Guangzhi, Piya, and Baopuzi, an entry for the zhen also appears in the Sancai Tuhui along with a woodblock print. In the historical records of ancient China, references to the zhen are usually in the form of the idiom 《飲鴆止渴》; yǐnzhènzhǐkě; 'drinking zhen to quench one's thirst', or when making comparisons between zhendu and the poison from monkshood. The idiom is usually meant to describe one who merely considers short-term benefits, not contemplating the grave consequences of their actions. Such references include the chapter "Duke Min's First Year" within the Zuo Tradition:

The Rong and Di are like dholes and wolves and may not be satisfied; the various Xia states are close intimates and may not be abandoned. Ease and peace are like zhen's poison and may not be contemplated.

and in the "Biography of Huo Xu" from the Book of the Later Han:

Would that not be like a person appeasing his hunger by eating monkshood, or quenching the thirst by drinking zhendu? The person would die as soon as the poison entered his throat, way before they could make their way to his stomach to quench his hunger or thirst. How could [anyone] do such a thing?

The 9th century Wunengzi uses Zhen as a parable for misguided scorn, with Zhen being confronted by a poisonous snake deeming it evil for being such itself. Zhen retorts by stating that it is the snake's poison that it uses, and that it protects people from the snake's bites by hunting them. Therefore, because humans are the ones who use its feathers to kill, it cannot be blamed for what comes from that usage.

In Chinese accounts, there are a number of mentions about zhendu poisoning used in failed and successful assassinations, but because zhen eventually became a metaphor for any type of poisoning in general, it is not always clear if the bird-poison was actually employed in each case. Various hagiographic sources relate that Wang Chuyi, a disciple of Wang Chongyang, was said to have been immune to poisons, even surviving after drinking liquor that contained the zhendu.

In the Japanese historical epic Taiheiki, Ashikaga Takauji and his brother Ashikaga Tadayoshi force Prince Morinaga to take zhendu (Japanese: chin doku). Later, Tadayoshi was himself captured and poisoned with zhendu.

== Existence ==
Wild zhenniao were supposedly last seen in the Song dynasty when many farming Han Chinese moved to Guangdong and Guangxi. Humans are supposed to have killed them all. Chinese ornithologists have often theorized that the zhen was similar to the secretary bird or the crested serpent eagle—which happens to live in southern China—and gained their toxicity from ingesting poisonous snakes, similar to how poison dart frogs produce poison by ingesting poisonous insects. As a consequence, in some illustrated books, pictures very similar to these two birds have been used to depict the zhen.

However, throughout most modern history, zoologists knew of no poisonous birds and presumed the zhen to be a fabulous invention of the mind. In 1992, an article was published in the journal Science reporting that the hooded pitohui of New Guinea has poisonous feathers; since then, a few other species of similarly poisonous birds have been discovered, most of which also gain their poison from their prey. A 2007 article published in China questioned whether or not the zhen could have really existed.

== Variation ==
According to Eastern Jin scholar Guo Pu, two different kinds of birds were called zhen: a poisonous, snake-eating bird of prey, and a pheasant-like species—which purportedly dwelt on Mount Yaobi and preyed instead on foul-smelling bugs called 蜚; fěi.

== See also ==
- Birds in Chinese mythology

== External references ==
- The Idiom "Drinking Zhen to quench one's thirst" (Chinese)
- 春秋左傳 - Chun Qiu Zuo Zhuan (Full Chinese text for the Biography of Qi Huan Gong)
- 太平記 (Full Japanese text for the Taiheiki)
