= Tenghuang =

Legendary creature in Chinese mythology

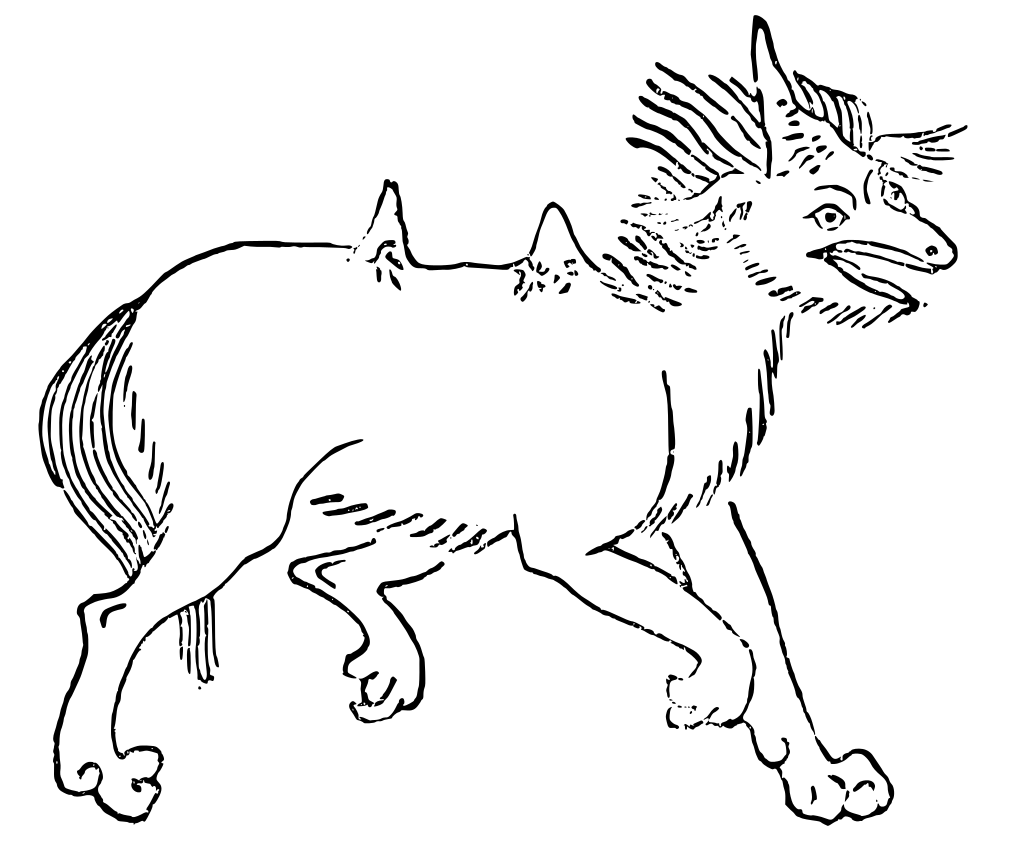
A drawing of Tenghuang from the Shanhaijing

Tenghuang (Chinese: 騰黃) is a mythological creature which is symbol of auspiciousness in Chinese mythology. It is mentioned in the Shanhaijing.

== Names ==
Tenghuang also known by various names as Chenghuang (Chinese: 乘黃), Feihuang (Chinese: 飛黃), Guhuang (Chinese: 古黃), and Cuihuang (Chinese: 翠黃)

== Appearance ==
There are two versions of what Tenghuang looked like. It is said to be a beast like a fox, with wings and horns like a dragon on its back. The life span of those who ride it can grow to two thousand years. Another claim states that it has the appearance of a horse.

== Folk sayings ==
There is an idiom in Chinese, "Flying the Yellow Tengda" (飛黃騰達) or "Riding on the Tenghuang". It is used to describe a person ascending and gaining a high position or reputation.
