= Jingwei =

Bird in Chinese mythology

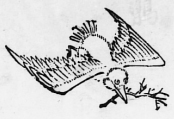
Jingwei as depicted in the 1597 edition of the Shanhaijing

Jingwei (traditional Chinese: 精衛; simplified Chinese: 精卫; pinyin: Jīngwèi; Wade–Giles: Ching-wei; lit. 'Spirit Guardian') is a bird in Chinese mythology, who was transformed from Yandi's daughter Nüwa. (Note: This is not to be confused with the goddess Nüwa who created mankind and repaired the heavens (Yang & An, 2005).) She is also a goddess in Chinese mythology. After she drowned when playing in the Eastern Sea, she metamorphosed into a bird called Jingwei. Jingwei is determined to fill up the sea, so she continuously carries a pebble or twig in her mouth and drops it into the Eastern Sea.

== Classic version ==
The story is recorded in the Shanhaijing:

Three thousand ninety li farther southeast, then northeast, stands Departing-Doves Mountain. On its heights are many mulberry trees. There is a bird dwelling here whose form resembles a crow with a patterned head, white beak, and red feet. It is called Jingwei and makes a sound like its name. She is the younger daughter of the Flame Thearch named Nüwa. Nüwa was swimming in the Eastern Sea when she was unable to return to shore and drowned. She then transformed into the bird Spirit-Guardian and regularly carries twigs and stones from the Western Mountains to fill up the Eastern Sea. The Zhang River emanates from here and flows eastward into the Yellow River.

The poet Tao Qian mentioned Jingwei in his Thirteen Poems upon Reading the Guideways through Mountains and Seas, where he made an association between Jingwei and Xingtian in their persistence to overcome tragedies but also mentions their inability to be free from it:

"[Jingwei] bites hold of twigs, determined to fill up the deep-blue sea. Xingtian dances wildly with spear and shield, his old ambitions still burn fiercely. After blending with things, no anxieties should remain. After metamorphosing, all one's regrets should flee. In vain do they cling to their hearts from the past. How can they, a better day, foresee?"

== In popular culture ==
Jingwei has a dialogue with the sea where the sea scoffs at her, saying that she won't be able to fill it up even in a million years, whereupon she retorts that she will spend ten million years, even one hundred million years, whatever it takes to fill up the sea so that others would not have to perish as she did. From this myth comes the Chinese chengyu (four-character idiom) "Jingwei Tries To Fill the Sea" (Jīngwèi tián hǎi 精衛填海), meaning dogged determination and perseverance in the face of seemingly impossible odds.

In 1988, a dome mural painting of Jingwei's legend was revealed in Tianjin railway station.

She is also a playable Smite heroine.

== Fruit fly genetics ==
Professor Manyuan Long of the University of Chicago named a Drosophila gene (jgw) after Jingwei because it is - like the princess - "reincarnated" with a new function and a new appearance (structure). Related genes were named following Chinese mythology.

== See also ==
- Birds in Chinese mythology

== Bibliography ==
- Strassberg, Richard E. (2002). A Chinese Bestiary: Strange Creatures from the Guideways Through Mountains and Seas. Berkeley: University of California press. p. 132. ISBN 0-520-21844-2.
- Lihui Yang and Deming An with Jessica Anderson Turner (2005). Handbook of Chinese mythology (PDF). ABC-CLIO, Inc. ISBN 1-57607-807-8. Archived (PDF) from the original on February 2, 2026.
