= Bifang =

Bird in Chinese mythology

Imperial Encyclopaedia, "Animal Kingdom", picture 113, Bifang image (畢方圖)

The Bifang (traditional Chinese: 畢方; simplified Chinese: 毕方; pinyin: Bì Fāng; Wade–Giles: Pi Fang) is a mythological bird, encountered in Chinese mythology. The Bifang is thought to have one leg. However, sources vary in terms of its description.

== Hanfeizi ==
Han Fei dates back to the third century BCE.The Bifang bird is described by Han Fei, in his work Hanfeizi. According to the Hanfeizi the Bifang is an auspicious bird which was a companion to Huangdi (the "Yellow Emperor") (Strassberg 2002, 110).

== Shanhaijing ==
The Shanhaijing also known as the Classic of Mountains and Seas is of indeterminate age, yet a perennial favourite. The commentary by Guo Pu is subsequent. The Bifang bird is item sixty-nine. The Bifang is described here as one-legged, crane-like, red markings on green, white-beaked, named by onomatopoiesis by the sound it makes, and an omen of fire (Strassberg 2002, 110–111). According to the Shanhaijing and it's commentaries, the Bifang can be found on Mount Zhang'e and/or east of the Feathered People (Youmin) and west of the Blue River (Strassberg 2002, 110 and 163).

== Huainanzi ==
The Bifang bird is described in the Huainanzi, developed by various persons associated with the circle around Liu An, ruler of Huainan, dating back to the second century BCE. Huainanzi associates the Bifang bird with the Wu Xing element Wood (Strassberg 2002, 110–111)

== See also ==
- Birds in Chinese mythology
- Chinese mythology
- Crane in Chinese mythology
- Shangyang (rainbird)
