= Qingniao =

Birds which appear in Chinese mythology

The Qingniao (traditional Chinese: 青鳥; simplified Chinese: 青鸟; pinyin: qīngniǎo; lit. 'Blue (or Green) Bird (or birds)') were blue or green birds which appear in Chinese mythology, popular stories, poetry, and religion (the Chinese are somewhat ambiguous in regard to English color vocabulary, and the word qing may and has been translated as "blue" or "green", or even "black"). Qingniao is especially regarded as the messengers or as otherwise serving the Queen Mother of the West Xi Wangmu. In some sources, three-legged Qingniao carry her messages; in other sources, a single one-legged Qingniao fetched her food. In some versions, three, sometimes three-legged, green birds brought her food: these seem to have some similarity with the Three-footed birds believed to reside in the sun. (Sometimes these birds are called "crows".) The Qingniao are an important motif and frequently depicted in myths regarding Xi Wangmu and her Western Paradise, which is generally located on the mythical Kunlun Mountain.

== See also ==
- Birds in Chinese mythology
- Chinese mythology
- Distinction of blue and green in various languages
- Shangyang (rainbird), a mythical one-legged bird
- Three-legged crow
