= Three-legged crow =

Mythical bird

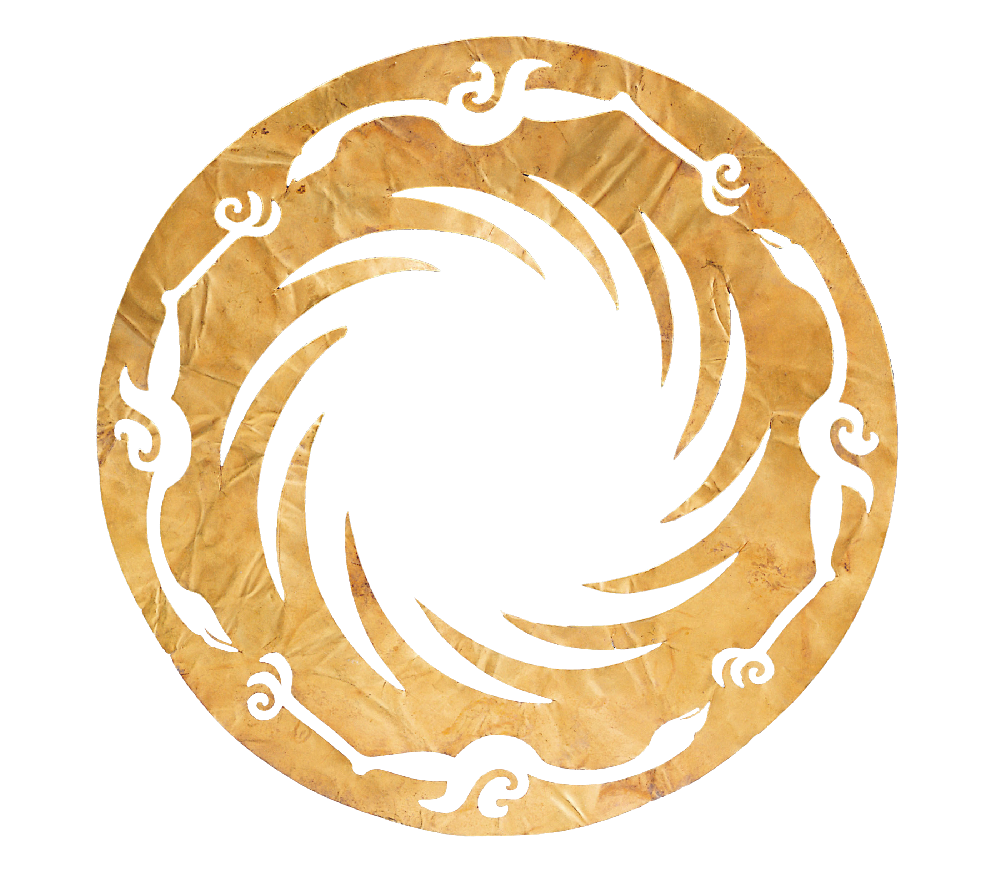
Sun and Immortal Birds Gold Ornament by ancient Shu people. The center is a sun pattern with twelve points around which four three-legged crows fly in the same counterclockwise direction, Ancient Kingdom of Shu.

The three-legged (or tripedal) crow is a mythological creature in various mythologies and arts of East Asia. It is believed to inhabit and represent the Sun.

Evidence of the earliest bird-Sun motif or totemic articles were excavated around 5000 BCE in China. This bird-Sun totem heritage was observed in later Yangshao and Longshan cultures. Also, in Northeast Asia, artifacts of birds and phoenix observed to be a symbol of leadership was excavated from around 5500 BCE in Xinle culture and later Hongshan culture from Liao river basin.

The Chinese have several versions of crow and crow-Sun tales. But the most popular depiction and myth of the Sun crow is that of the Yangwu or Jinwu, the "golden crow". It has also been found figured on ancient coins from Lycia and Pamphylia.

== China ==
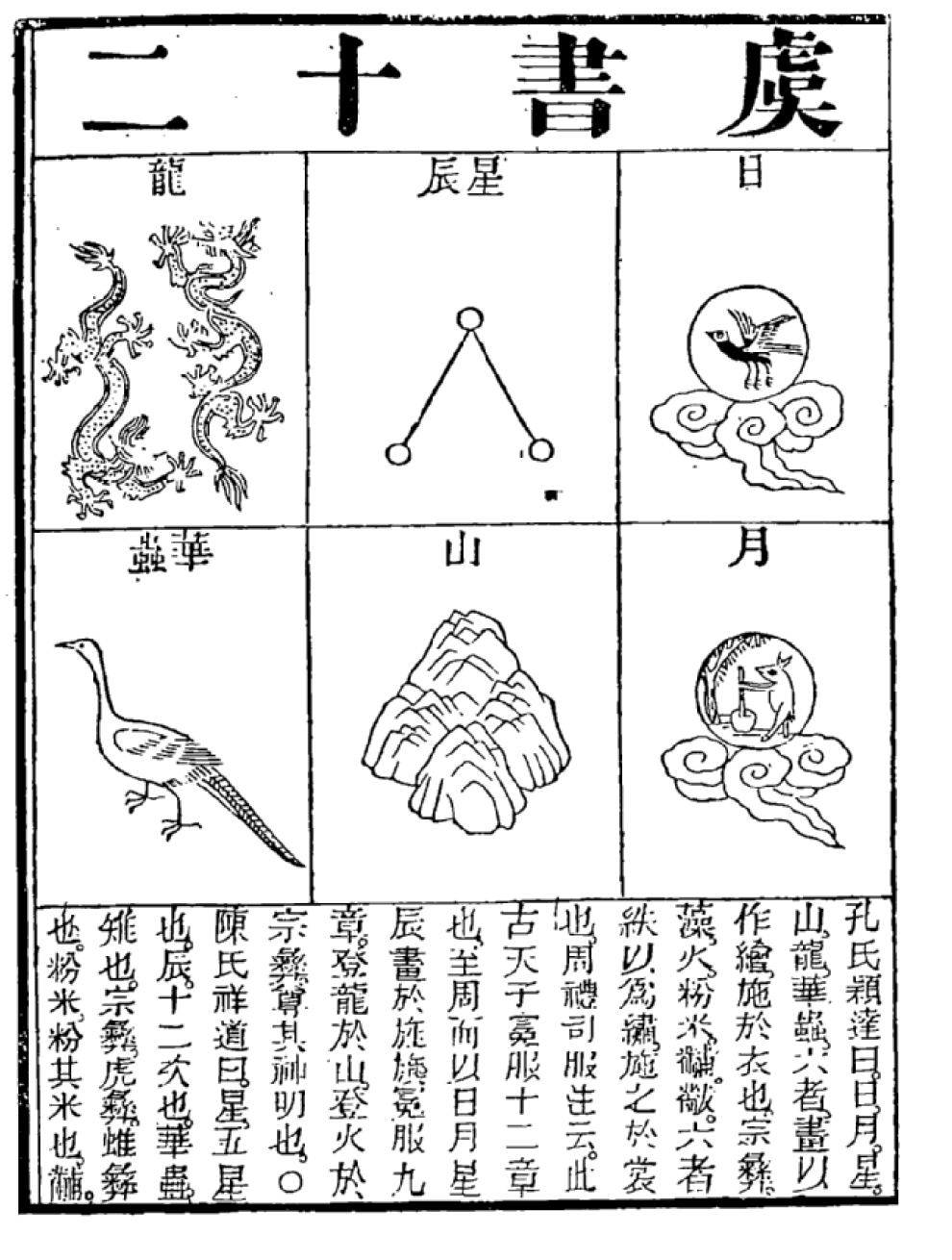
The sanzuwu in a disc representing the sun (top row: right) is one of the twelve ornaments which decorates the Imperial garments in China.

In Chinese mythology and culture, the three-legged crow is called the sanzuwu (simplified Chinese: 三足乌; traditional Chinese: 三足烏; pinyin: sān zú wū; Cantonese Yale: saam^{1}zuk^{1}wu^{1}; Shanghainese: sae tsoh u) and is present in many myths. It is also mentioned in the Shanhaijing. The earliest known depiction of a three-legged crow appears in Neolithic pottery of the Yangshao culture.

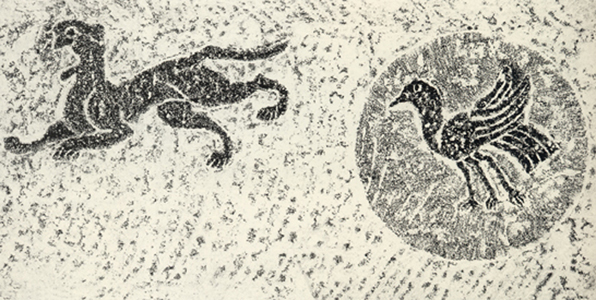
Mural from the Han dynasty (206 BCE – 220 CE) found in Henan province depicting a three-legged crow

The sanzuwu in a disc represents the sun and is also one of the Twelve Ornaments that is used in the decoration of formal imperial garments in ancient China.

=== Sun crow in Chinese mythology ===
The most popular depiction and myth of a sanzuwu is of a sun crow called the Yangwu (陽烏), more commonly referred to as the Jinwu (金烏; 'golden crow') or "golden crow". Even though it is described as a corvid, it is usually coloured red instead of black. A silk painting from the Western Han excavated at the Mawangdui archaeological site also depicts a "golden crow" in the sun. In ancient Chinese depictions, the Chinese god of creation, Fuxi, is often depicted carrying the sun disk with the 'golden crow' (金烏; jīnwū) while the Chinese goddess of creation, Nüwa, holds the moon disk which contains a gold-striped toad.

According to folklore, there were originally ten sun crows which settled in 10 separate suns. They perched on a red mulberry tree called the Fusang, literally meaning "the leaning mulberry tree", in the East at the foot of the Valley of the Sun. This mulberry tree was said to have many mouths opening from its branches. Each day one of the sun crows would be rostered to travel around the world on a carriage, driven by Xihe, the 'mother' of the suns. As soon as one sun crow returned, another one would set forth in its journey crossing the sky. According to the Shanhaijing, the sun crows loved eating two grasses of immortality, one called the Diri (地日; dìrì; 'ground sun'), and the other the Chunsheng (春生; 'spring grow'). The sun crows would often descend from heaven on to the earth and feast on these grasses, but Xihe did not like this; thus, she covered their eyes to prevent them from doing so. Folklore also held that, at around 2170 BCE, all ten sun crows came out on the same day, causing the world to burn; Hou Yi, the celestial archer, saved the day by shooting down all but one of the sun crows.

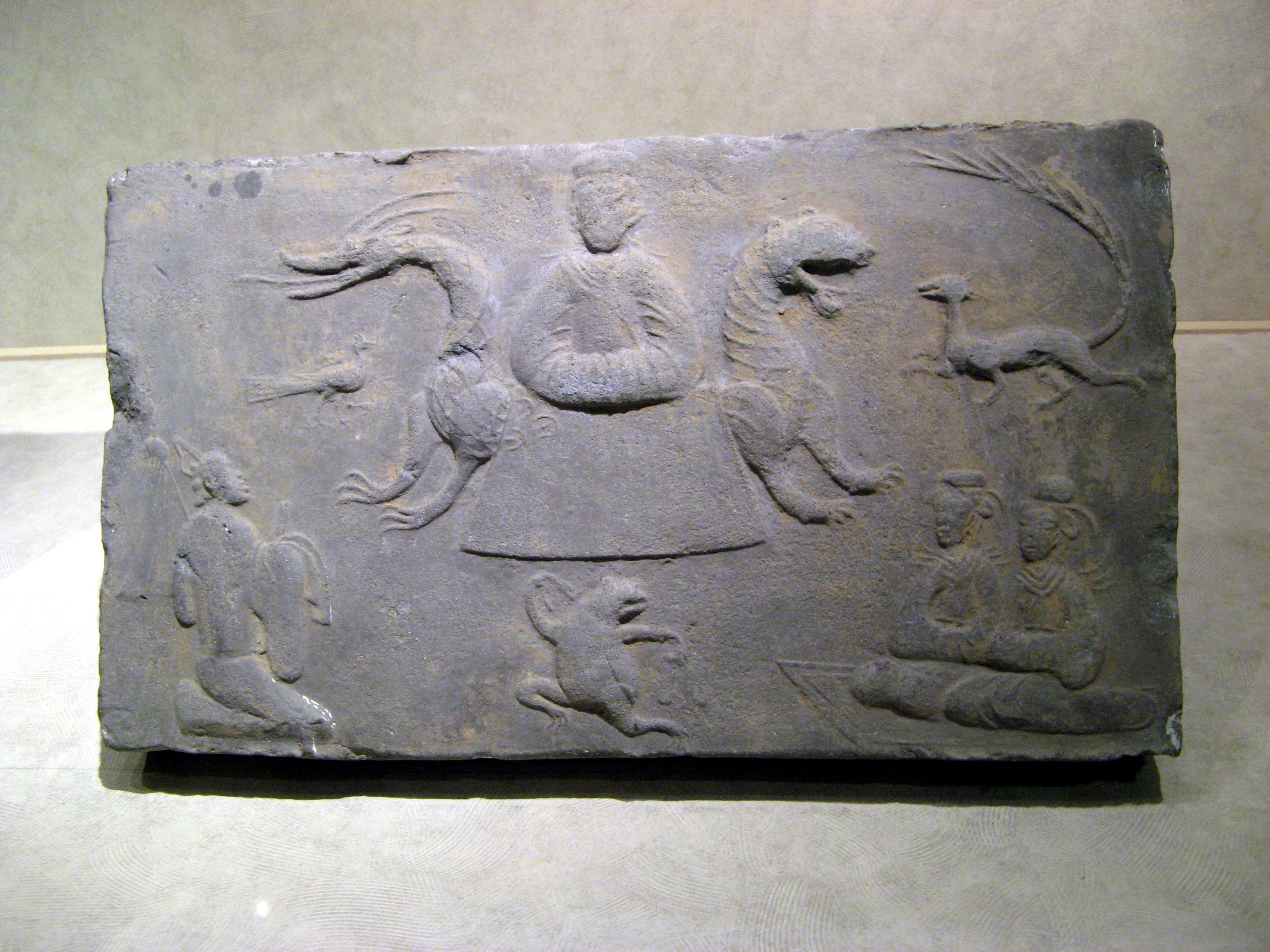
The Queen Mother of the West sits upon a throne, flanked by Tiger (west, autumn, yin) and Dragon (east, spring, yang). She is surrounded by a nine-tailed fox, two seated women, a leaping frog, a male attendant, and a three-legged crow, Eastern Han dynasty, 25–220 CE.

The sanzuwu is also depicted with the Queen Mother of the West who are believed to be her messengers.

=== Other tripedal creatures in Chinese mythology ===
In Chinese mythology, there are other three-legged creatures besides the crow, for instance, the 魊; yu "a three-legged tortoise that causes malaria".

The three-legged crow symbolizing the sun has a yin yang counterpart in the 蟾蜍; chánchú "three-legged toad" symbolizing the moon (along with the moon rabbit). According to an ancient tradition, this toad is the transformed Chang'e lunar deity who stole the elixir of life from her husband Houyi the archer, and fled to the moon where she was turned into a toad.

The Fènghuáng is commonly depicted as being two-legged but there are some instances in art in which it has a three-legged appearance.

Xi Wangmu (Queen Mother of the West) is also said to have three green birds (青鳥; qīngniǎo) that gathered food for her and in Han-period religious art they were depicted as having three legs. In the Yongtai Tomb dating to the Tang dynasty Era, when the Cult of Xi Wangmu flourished, the birds are also shown as being three-legged.

== Japan ==
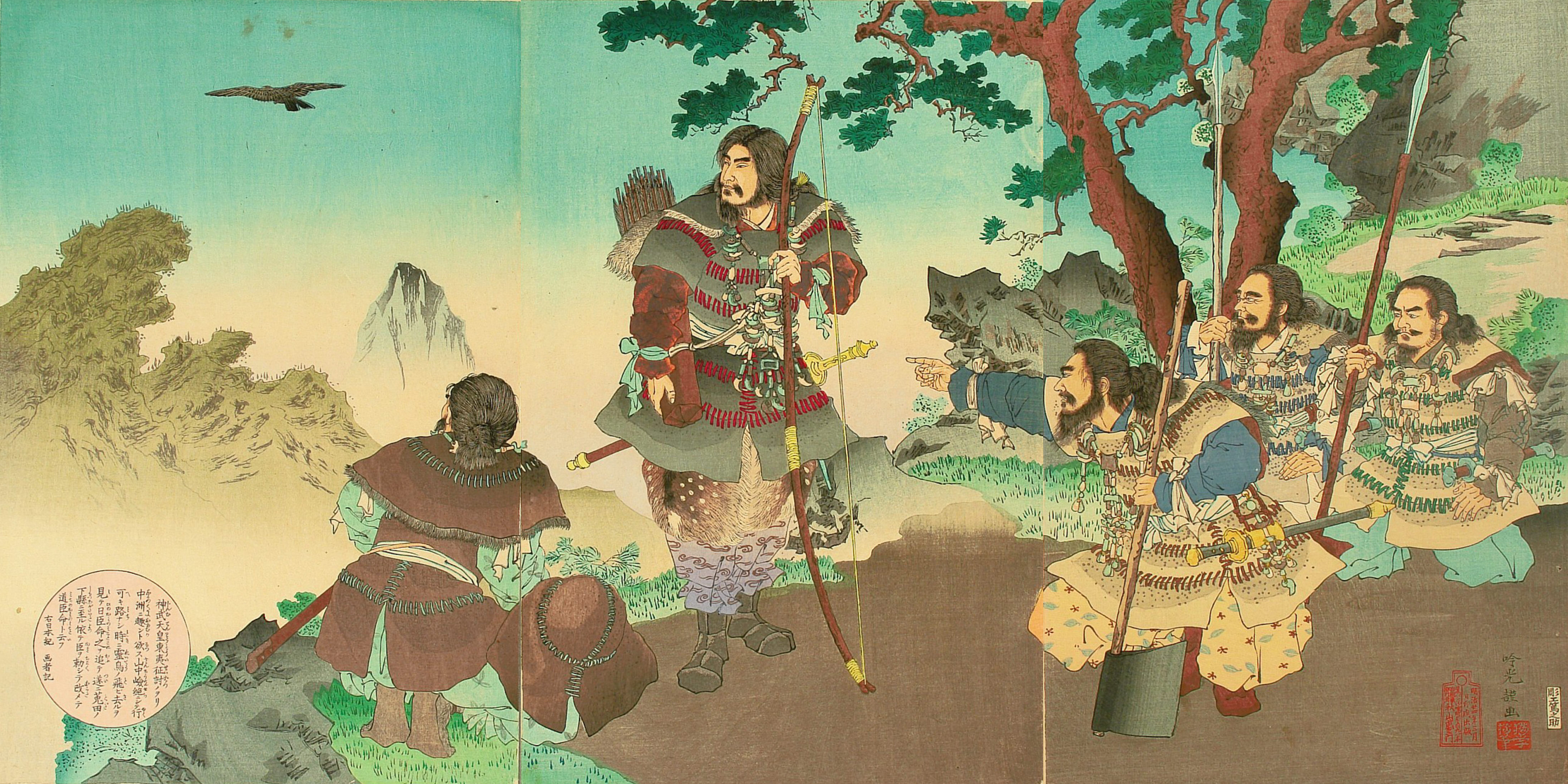
Yatagarasu guides legendary Emperor Jimmu towards the plain of Yamato.

In Japanese mythology, this flying creature is a raven or a jungle crow called Yatagarasu (八咫烏; "eight-span crow") and the appearance of the great bird is construed as evidence of the will of Heaven or divine intervention in human affairs.

Although Yatagarasu is mentioned in a number of places in Shintō, the depictions are primarily seen on Edo wood art, dating back to the early 1800s wood-art era. Although not as celebrated today, the crow is a mark of rebirth and rejuvenation; the animal that has historically cleaned up after great battles symbolized the renaissance after such tragedy.

Yatagarasu as a crow-god is a symbol specifically of guidance. This great crow was sent from heaven as a guide for legendary Emperor Jimmu on his initial journey from the region which would become Kumano to what would become Yamato (Yoshino and then Kashihara). It is generally accepted that Yatagarasu is an incarnation of Kamotaketsunumi no Mikoto, but none of the early surviving documentary records are quite so specific.

In more than one instance, Yatagarasu appears as a three legged crow not in Kojiki but in Wamyō Ruijushō.

Both the Japan Football Association and subsequently its administered teams such as the Japan national football team use the symbol of Yatagarasu in their emblems and badges respectively. The winner of the Emperor's Cup is also given the honor of wearing the Yatagarasu emblem the following season.

Although the Yatagarasu is commonly perceived as a three-legged crow, there is in fact no mention of it being such in the original Kojiki. Consequently, it is theorised that this is a result of a later possible misinterpretation during the Heian period that the Yatagarasu and the Chinese Yangwu refer to an identical entity.

== Korea ==
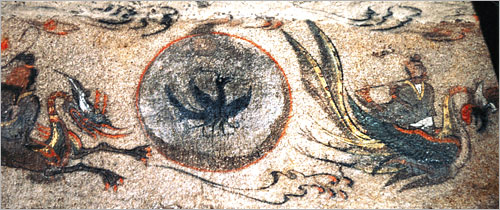
Three-legged crow flanked by dragon and phoenix. Mural from the Korean Goguryeo period, Ohoe Tomb nº 4, 6th–7th century, Ji'an, China.

In Korean mythology, it is known as Samjok-o (Korean: 삼족오; Hanja: 三足烏 – literally "three-legged crow"). During the Goguryeo period, the ancient Korean people thought the Samjok-o to be a symbol of the sun and of great power, often representing the Taewang (태왕; 太王; lit. 'Emperor; Greatest of Kings') and Goguryeo's sovereignty. It was also believed that the three-legged crow lived in the sun while a toad lived in the moon. The Samjok-o is such a highly respected symbol of power, even superior to both the dragon and the Korean bonghwang, that it carried into Silla, Goryeo, Joseon, and modern Korea.

Samjok-o appeared in the story Yeonorang Seonyeo. A couple, Yeono and Seo, lived on the beach of the East Sea in 157 (King Adalla 4), and rode to Japan on a moving rock. The Japanese took two people to Japan as kings and noblemen. At that time, the light of the sun and the moon disappeared in Silla. King Adalla sent an official to Japan to return the couple, but Yeono said to take the silk that was made by his wife, Seo, and sacrifice it to the sky. As he said this, the sun and moon were brighter again.

In modern Korea, Samjok-o is still found especially in television dramas such as Jumong. The three-legged crow was one of several emblems under consideration to replace the bonghwang in the Korean seal of state when its revision was considered in 2008. The Samjok-o appears also in Jeonbuk Hyundai Motors FC's current emblem. There are some Korean companies using Samjok-o as their corporate logos.

== See also ==
- Birds in Chinese mythology
- Three-legged turtle
- Triskelion
