= Nine-headed bird =

Creature in Chinese mythology

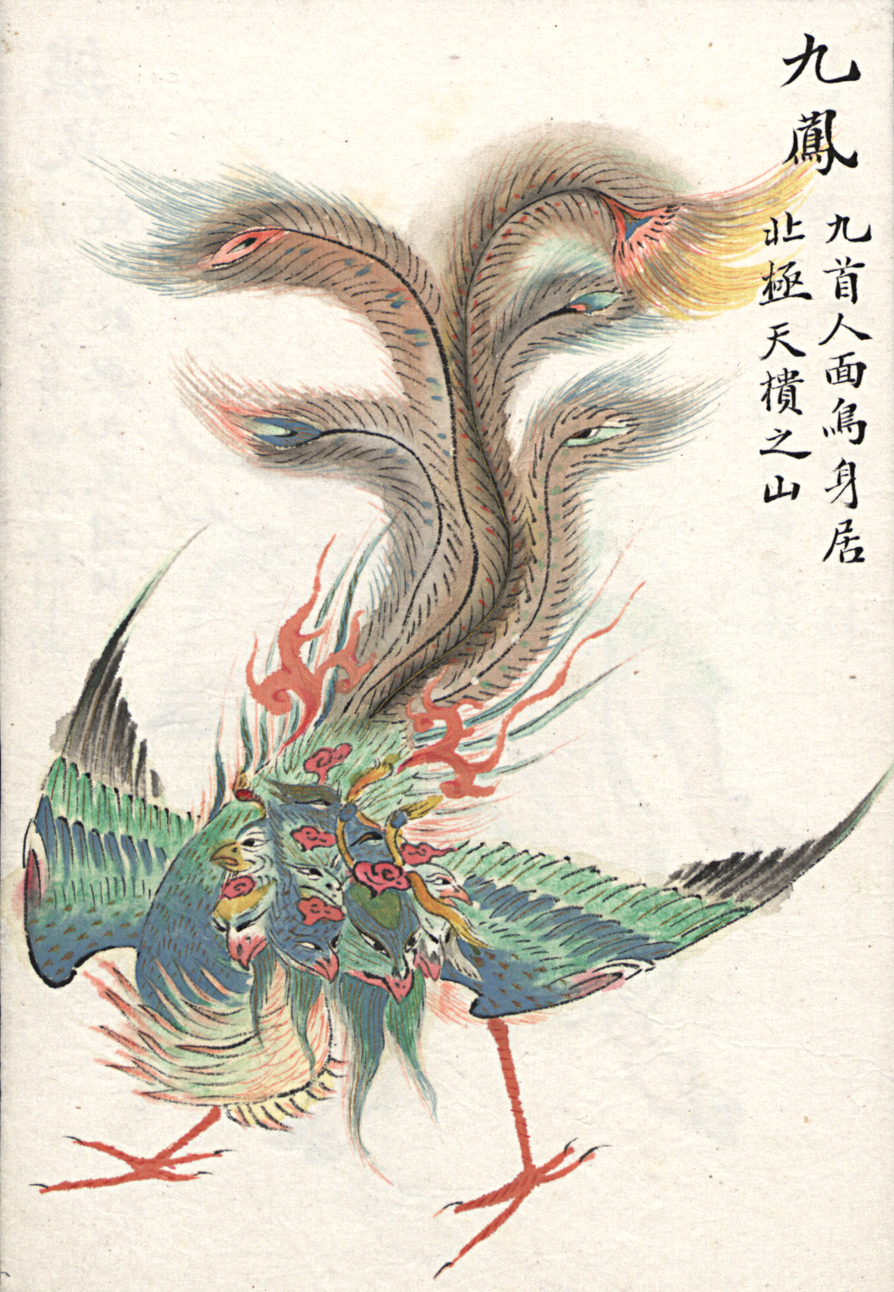
An illustration from the Qing dynasty.

The nine-headed bird (Chinese: 九頭鳥), also called the "Nine Phoenix" (九鳳), is one of the earliest forms of the fenghuang, worshipped by ancient natives in Hubei Province, which during the Warring States period was part of the kingdom of Chu (楚). Due to the hostile relationship between the Kingdom of Chu and its former overlord, the reigning Zhou dynasty, the nine-headed bird, being the totem creature of the Chu people, was demonised as a result.

In modern China, "nine-headed bird" is a derogatory term for Hubei people, used to mock Hubei people for being "cunning and deceitful." A famous proverb is "Above heaven there are nine-headed birds, on earth there are cunning Hubei people".

== Legends ==
The Nine-headed bird also appears in the 16th-century classic novel Journey to the West, where it is known as the Nine-Headed Beast (九頭蟲) or the Nine-Headed Prince Consort (九頭駙馬). As the son-in-law of the Wansheng Dragon King, he wields a monk's spade and conspires with his father-in-law to steal the śarīra from the pagoda. To confront these demons, Sun Wukong calls upon celestial forces for assistance. During the battle, Erlang Shen's hound, Xiaotian Quan, bites off one of the beast's heads, but the Nine-Headed Beast manages to escape to the North Sea.

To this day, there are still legends about the nine-headed bird dripping blood. These tales are rooted in the belief that "the bird originally had ten heads, and one was bitten off by a dog." In one of Ouyang Xiu's poems, it is written: "After three failed attempts to shoot it, a celestial dog was sent from the heavens. Once the dog bit off one of its heads, blood has continuously dripped from the severed head." Additionally, in a novel of the Southern Liang writer Yin Yun, it is recorded: "When the Duke of Zhou lived in the east, he despised the cry of this bird and ordered Tingshi to shoot it. Though one head was wounded, nine remained."

In Records of Doubtful Matters, Lu Changyuan noted that the bird was an evil omen, stating, "During the cold food period in the second and third months of spring, on a night of light rain and gloomy skies, a harsh, grating bird call was heard. As it passed over the courtyard, the family grew increasingly terrified, crying out that it was the nine-headed bird carrying ghosts. Moreover, this bird had once crushed one of its own heads against a closed door, and the blood had been dripping ever since. If the blood fell on someone's home, it was considered a disaster. The family huddled together at the door, barking like dogs to scare it away, urging it to pass quickly."

== See also ==
- Birds in Chinese mythology
