= Fuzhu (mythical beast) =

Mythical beast in ancient Chinese myths

Fuzhu (Chinese: 夫諸) is a mythical beast in ancient Chinese myths and legends. It appears in the Shanhaijing.

== Appearance ==
Fuzhu is described to be a kind of deer with four horns. It is described as being gentle and having a desire to be clean. The Fuzhu usually appears during periods of flood.
