= Cranes in Chinese mythology =

Motif in Chinese mythology

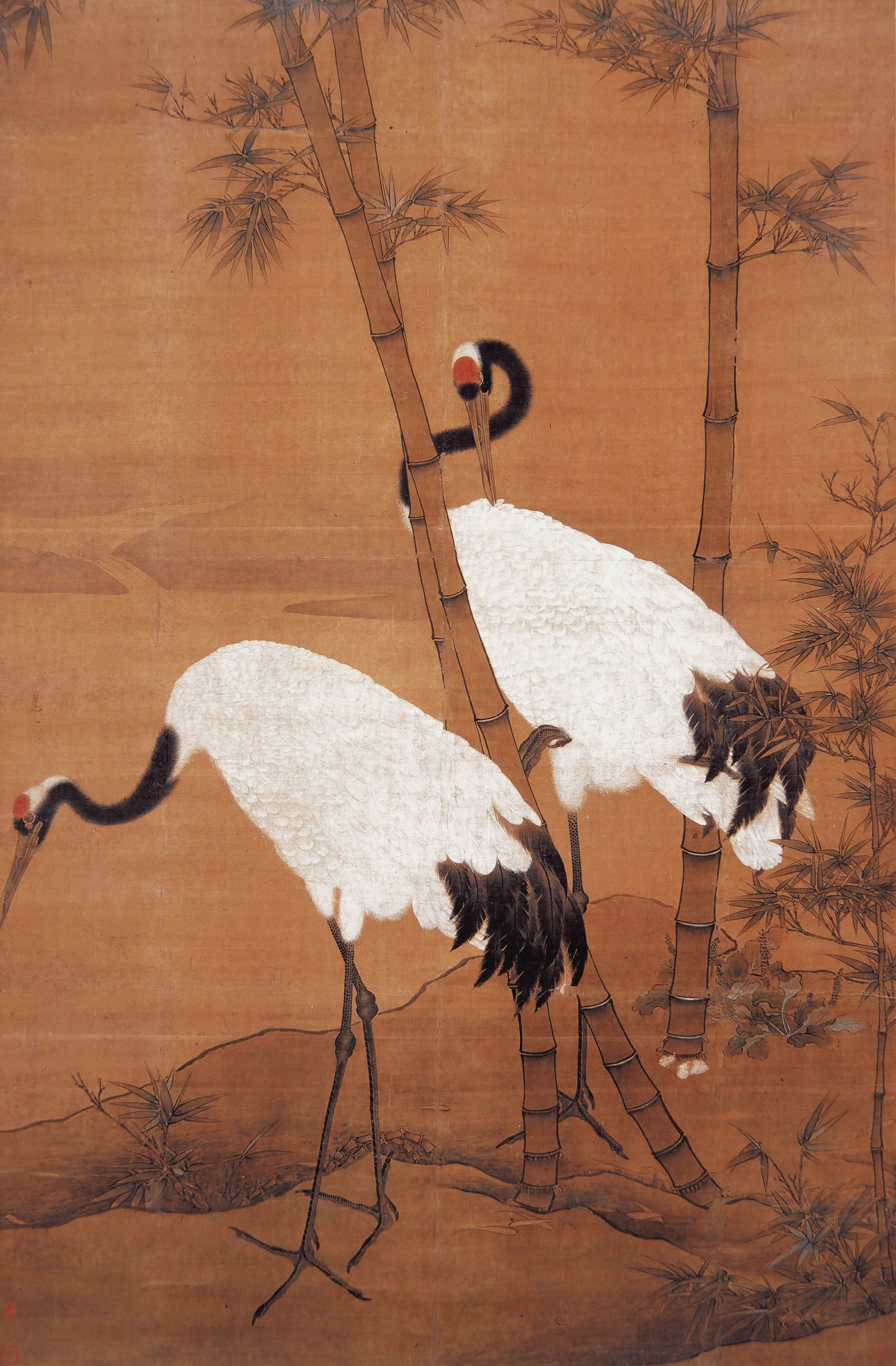
Bamboo and Cranes, by Bian Jingzhao

Cranes (simplified Chinese: 鹤; traditional Chinese: 鶴; pinyin: Hè) are an important motif in Chinese mythology. There are various myths involving cranes, and in Chinese mythology cranes are generally symbolically connected with the idea of longevity. In China, the crane mythology is associated with the divine bird worship in the animal totemism; cranes have a spiritual meaning where they are a form of divine bird which travels between heaven and man's world. Cranes regularly appear in Chinese arts such as paintings, tapestry, and decorative arts; they are also often depicted carrying the souls of the deceased to heaven. The crane is the second most important bird after the fenghuang, the symbol of the empress, in China.

The motifs of cranes may vary in a range from reference to real cranes (such as the red-crowned crane) referring to transformed Taoist immortals (xian), who sometimes were said to have magical abilities to transform into cranes in order to fly on various journeys. When a taoist priest dies, it is referred as yuhua (羽化; lit. "turning into a feathered (Crane)").

Chinese mythology refers to those myths found in the historical geographic area of China. The geographic area of "China" is, of course, a concept which has changed throughout history. Chinese mythology include myths in Chinese and other languages, as transmitted by Han Chinese as well as other minority ethnic groups.

== Legends and deities ==
Plums and crane, by Xu Gu.

=== Evolution of the crane with age ===
According to some Chinese legends, there are 4 kinds of cranes which differ in colours: white, yellow, blue, and black. The black crane is believed to have lived for centuries. According to Chinese legends, at the age of 1000, a crane would turn grey and after another 1000 years, the crane would turn dark; thus being termed as "the mysterious crane". According to some legends, a black crane no longer eats food and only drinks water when it turns 600 years old.

=== Cranes carrying pearl ===
- According to a Chinese legend, Tseng sang (a disciple of Confucius) spared the life of a wounded crane which then flew away but later came back to Tseng sang with its mate; both of them were carrying a pearl in their mouth which was then bestowed to Tseng sang.

=== Chinese deities and immortals ===
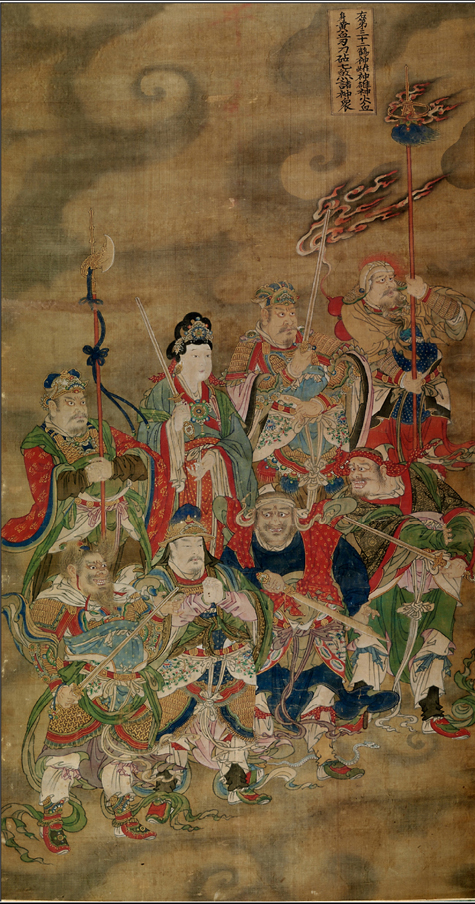
The Crane Deity (second from left in the back) and the Seven Inauspicious Deities, Shuilu ritual painting, Shanxi Museum

- As souls traditionally ride on a crane to go to the Western Heaven; crane illustrations with spread wings can appear in Chinese funeral material culture (e.g. on coffins or a banner in funeral processions). In the Western Han dynasty silk painting, cranes are depicted standing beside Nüwa.
- According to a popular story, one day, Lü Dongbin (one of the Eight immortals) drank in a wine shop and instead of paying, he drew 2 dancing cranes on the wall of the inn. The wall painting became famous attracting more customers; however, when the debt was paid, the cranes detached themselves from the wall and flew away.
- White Crane Immortal Boy (Xianhe Tongzi), an immortal who was transformed from an immortal crane according to the Investiture of the Gods.
- The Crane Deity (Chinese: 鶴神) is considered an ominous deity under the command of Tai Sui.

==== Crane as immortal rides ====
A crane which is used as a form of immortal ride is called an immortal crane.

- In the Shiyiji, Immortals often go to Mount Kunlun to play by riding on dragons and cranes.
- The Eight immortals are sometimes depicted in pictures greeting the god of longevity, Shouxing (壽星), who is flying past on a crane through auspicious clouds.
- According to Taoist legends, Laozi rode a crane after achieving immortality and cranes stand beside his statues. Some taoist robes are also referred as crane robes hechang (鶴氅).
- Xiwangmu is also often depicted riding a white crane.
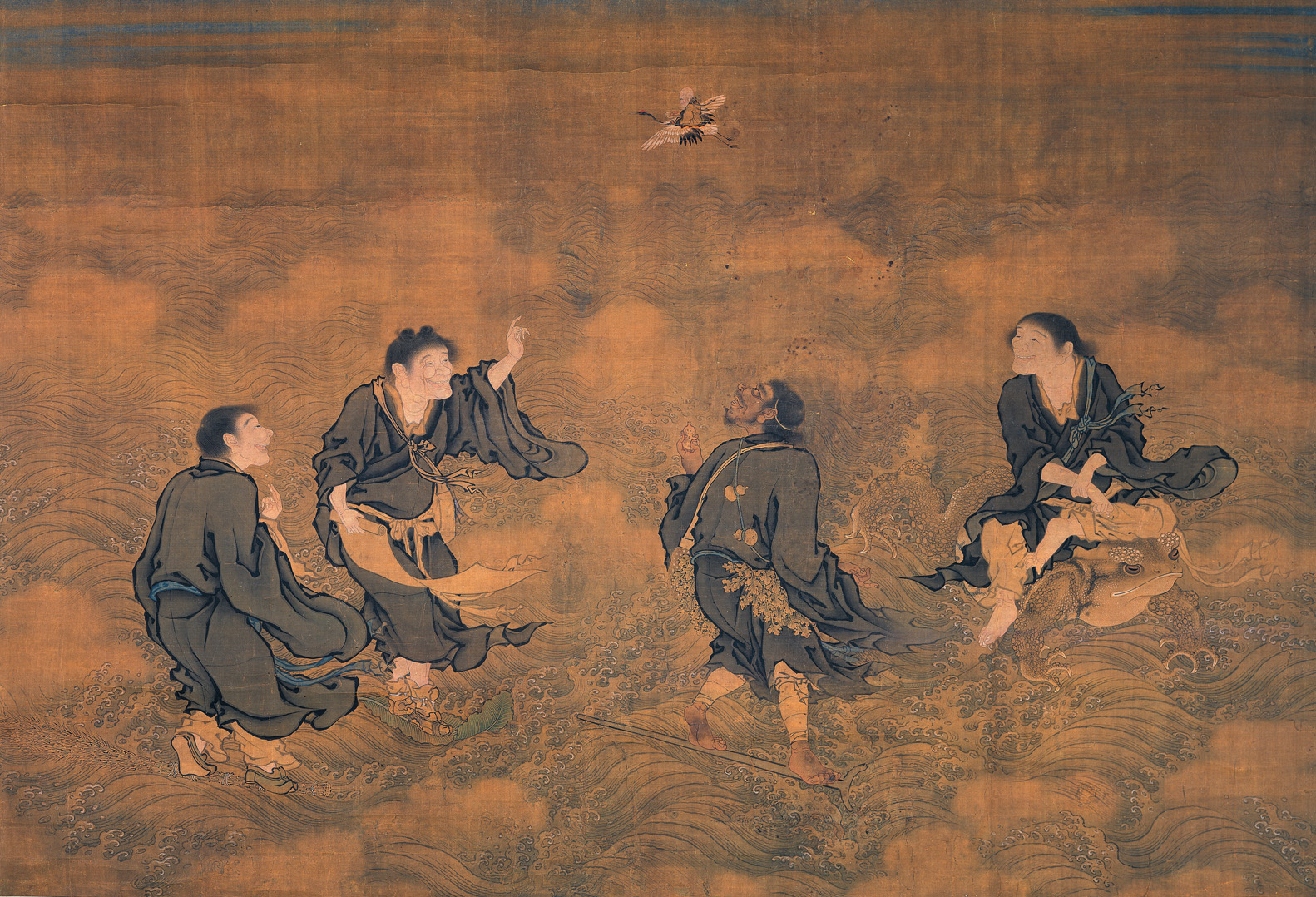
  Four Immortals Saluting Longevity, by Shang Xi (商喜), early Ming dynasty (1368–1644). The immortals are from left to right: Shide, Hanshan, Iron-Crutch Li, and Liu Haichan. The longevity deity riding the crane.
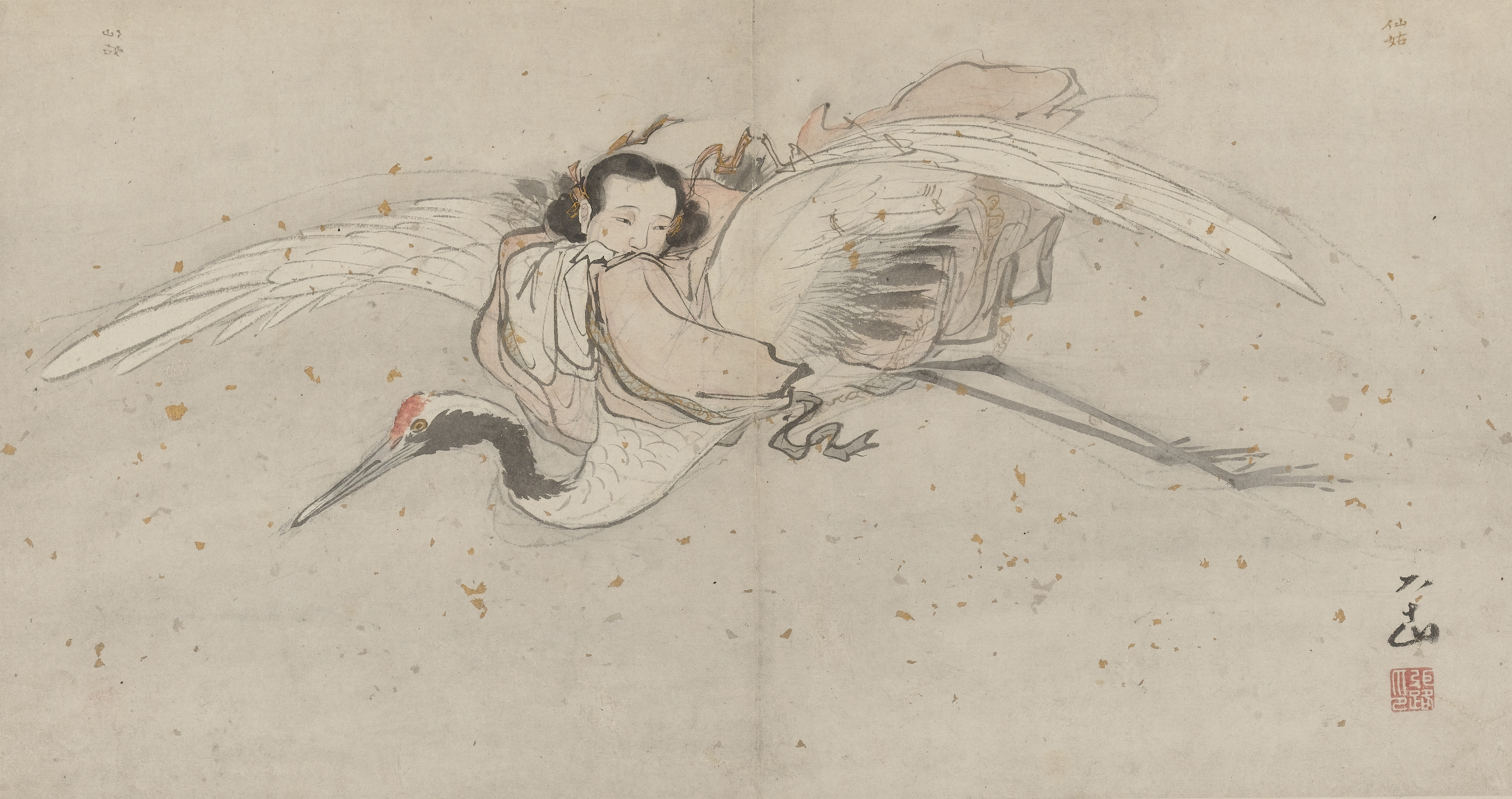
  Depiction of the Daoist immortal, He Xiangu, on a flying crane, by Zhang Lu (1464–1538), early 16th century.

=== Transformation into cranes ===
- In Chinese traditions, when pine trees are old, they can sometimes turn into cranes since both the pine trees and cranes have a long life-time.

== Dance ==
- A "dance of the white cranes" is a Chinese dance from the 500 BC in China.

== In popular culture ==
- In the Legend of White Snake, a white crane guards precious plants, such as the grass of immortality, which grow on Kunlun.

== Cultural significance and symbolism ==
In East Asian culture (China, Korea, Japan, Vietnam), the red-crowned crane is a symbol of happiness, good luck, long life, and marital bliss.

=== Demeanour and temperament ===
In ancient Chinese legends, the crane shows the elegance of the immortals, which included the meaning of elegance, moral integrity and the personal dignity of the immortals. The crane is often praised in classical Chinese literature and is perceived as elegant and graceful, and when a crane spreads its wings, it reflects an outstanding temperament.

=== Longevity ===
Cranes are one of the symbols of longevity in Chinese culture; as such, they are often depicted together with a pine tree or a stone, or together with a tortoise or a deer. It is also customary for Chinese people to give the picture of a crane to elderly people on their birthdays as it symbolizes good health and longevity.

==== Crane and pine tree ====
Pine trees and cranes together are symbols of longevity and also symbolize the last years of a long life. When flying cranes are combined with growing pines, the symbol of longevity is intensified.

==== Crane and herb of immortality ====
In popular prints, a crane is sometimes depicted with the herb of immortality (zhi) in its beak; this is a double symbol of longevity.

==== Crane and tortoise ====
According to Chinese beliefs, the combination of a tortoise and crane is associated with longevity. Like the crane, the tortoise is also one of the symbols of longevity in Chinese culture.

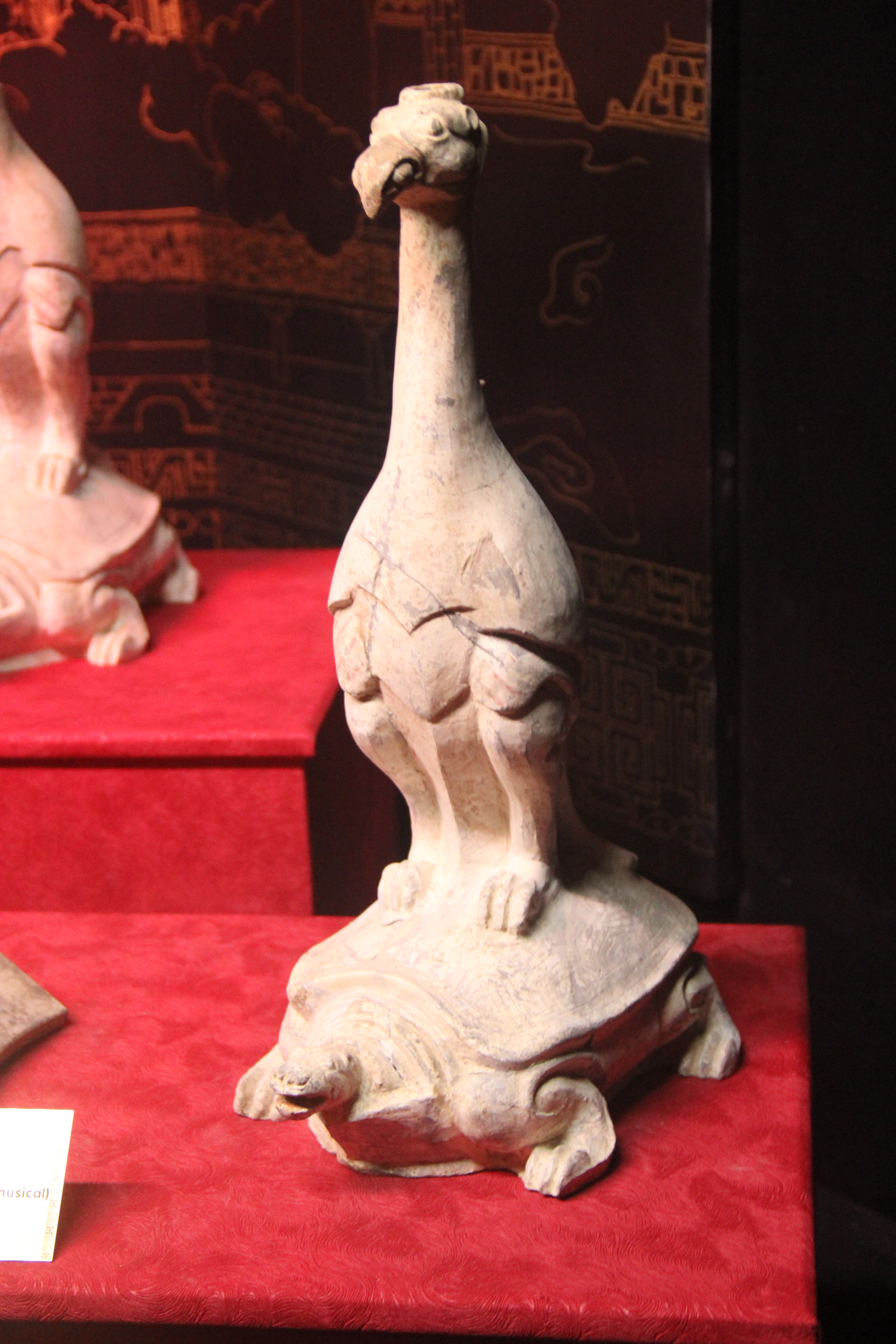
Crane and Tortoise, from the Mausoleum of Han Emperor Jingdi, Han dynasty.

==== Crane and peaches ====
The combination of a crane with peaches is one of the Chinese symbols of longevity, due to their associations with immortals (i.e. they were used as conveyance for immortals). Both of them are symbols of longevity in Chinese mythology. Immortals are often depicted on the back of cranes while mythical peaches are believed to grow in the orchard of Xiwangmu; therefore the combination of peaches and immortals evoke penglai, which is an isle for immortals.

=== Marker of social ranking in the Imperial Court ===
Cranes were depicted on the mandarin square of the Ming and Qing dynasties' court robes. In the Ming dynasty, the first class civil official would wear a buzi with a fairy crane (Chinese: 仙鹤; pinyin: xiānhè). The crane mandarin square when combined in a crane, water, clouds, and blue sky design reflects the emphasis on the wisdom and talent of the Chinese Imperial court's civil officials.

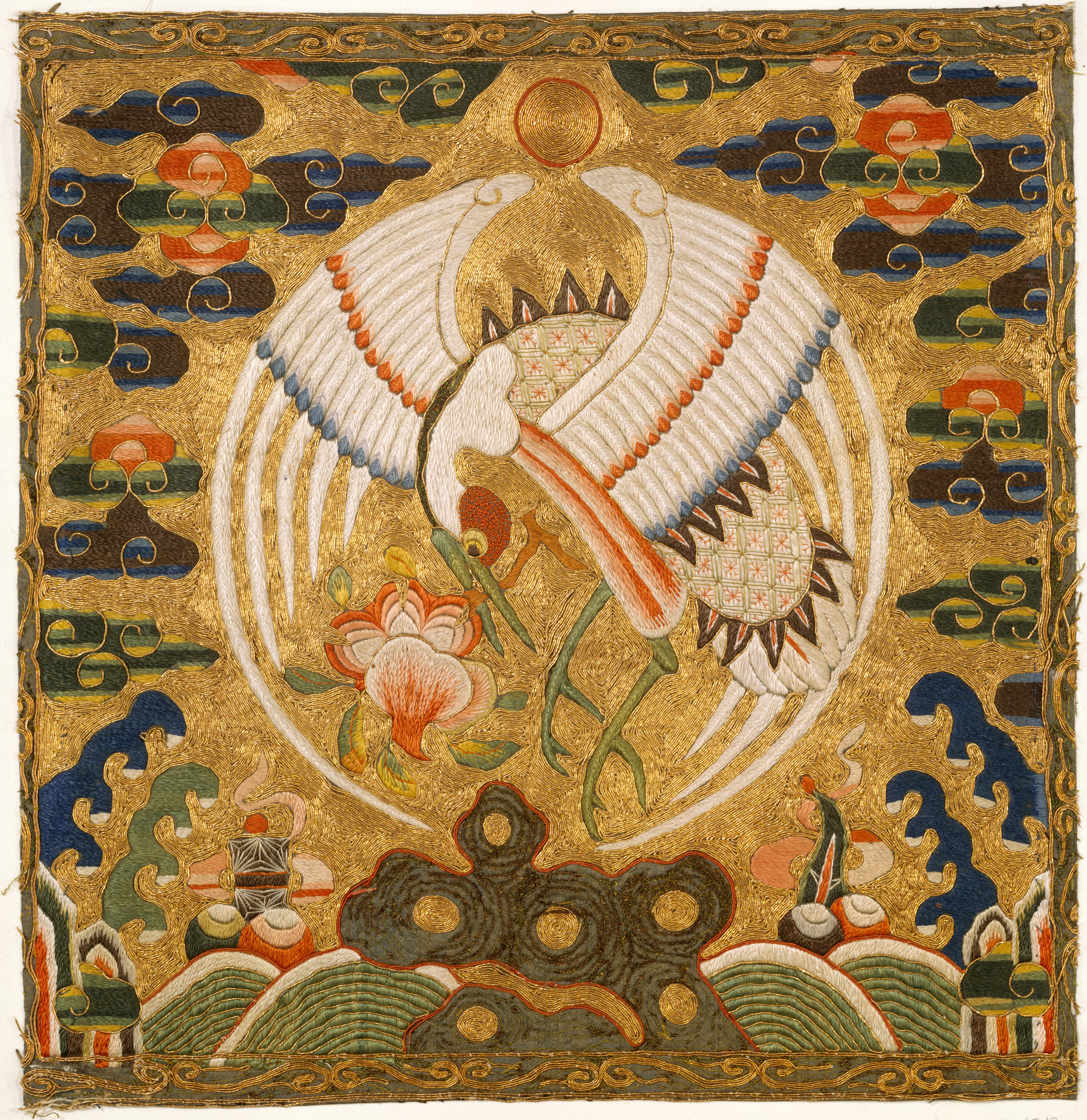
Rank badge with crane, early Qing dynasty, late 17th–early 18th century.

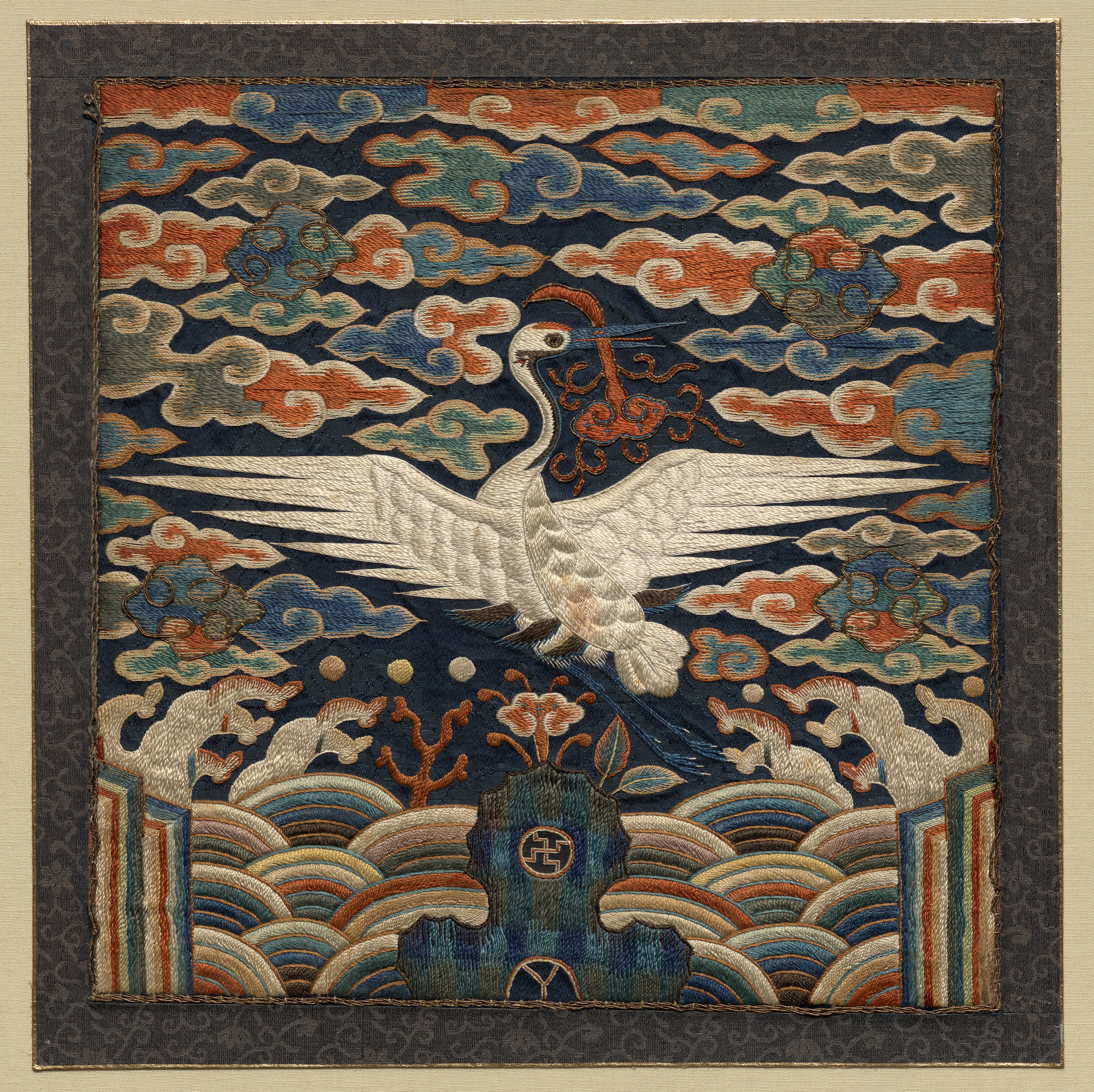
Rank badge with crane, late Qing dynasty, 19th century.

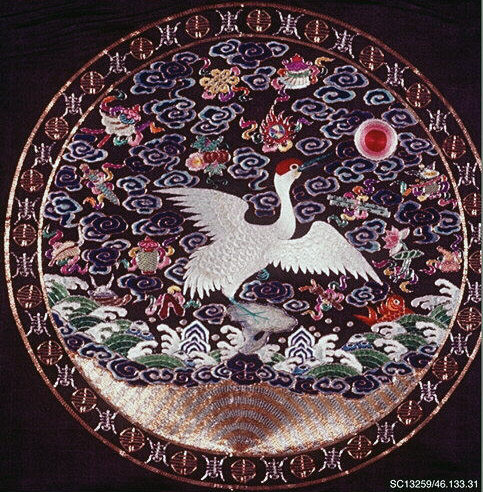
Rank badge with crane, late 19th century.

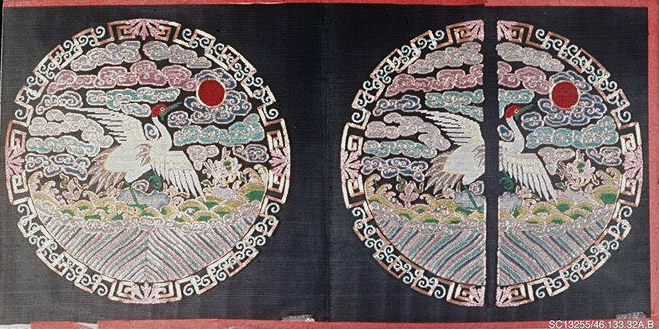
Rank badge with crane, late 19th century.

=== Wishes of prosperity ===
The illustrations of two cranes flying up towards the sun is used to express the wishes that the recipient of the illustration may 'rise high'.

=== Relationship between people ===
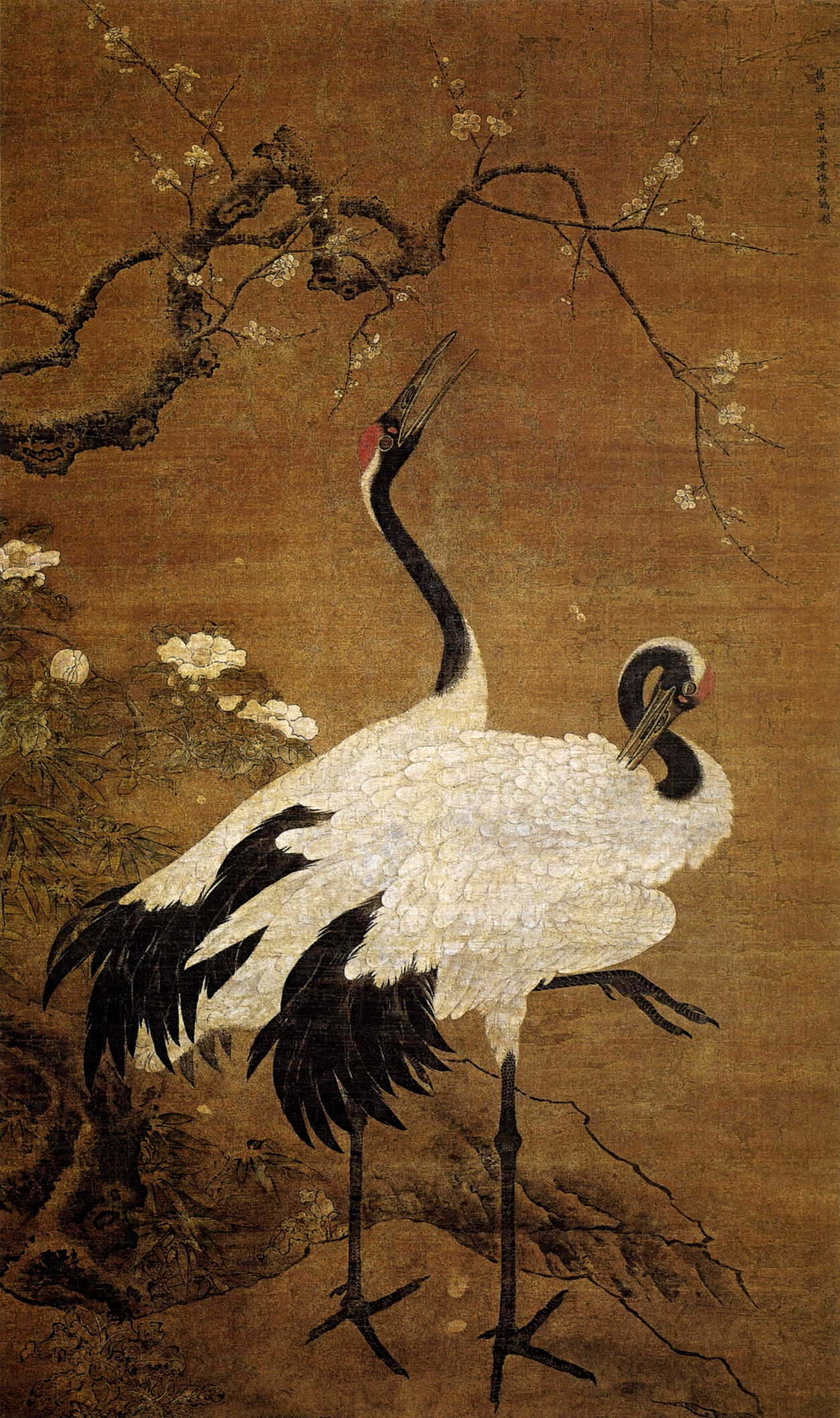
Snow Plums and Twin Cranes, early Ming dynasty (1368–1644).

When a crane is depicted with a fenghuang, mandarin duck, heron and a wagtail, this represents the Confucianist concepts of the five relationship between people (五伦). In this particular combination, the crane symbolizes the relationship between father and son.

Depictions of cranes in pairs were also associated with elderly couples as white feathers give the impression of the white hair of an elderly.

== Influences and derivative ==
=== Japan ===
The Japanese accepted the concept that the crane represented longevity when Chinese culture gradually influenced Japanese culture; the Japanese then gradually modified into becoming a symbol of joy. Since the 9th century, cranes are considered a symbol of happiness and the combination of a crane and tortoise is used in marriage ceremonies to represent both happiness and longevity.

== See also ==
- Bigu (avoiding grains), on use of crane bone marrow in a wugu immortality recipe
- Birds in Chinese mythology
- Chinese folklore, for general information on Chinese folklore
- Chinese folk religion, for general information on Chinese folk religion
- Chinese literature, for general information on Chinese literature
- Crane (bird), for general information on the cranes (Gruidae clade)
- Fujian White Crane, on a martial art style based on traditional ideas of the movements of cranes
- The Legend and the Hero, a cinematographic portrayal of the Fengshen Yanyi, with the White Crane Boy character from mythology
- Red-crowned crane, a large east Asian crane, important in mythology and symbolism
- South-pointing chariot, on an ancient technological device portraying associated cranes, tortoises, and xian (Taoist immortals)
- Xian (Taoism), on the Taoist immortals, who were closely associated with cranes, in various ways
- Yellow Crane Tower, on a series of structures of symbolic interest and in Chinese poetry
