= Biyiniao =

Birds in Chinese mythology

An illustration from Sancai Tuhui (1609).

In Chinese mythology, biyiniao (Chinese: 比翼鳥; variously translated as linked-wing birds, shared-wings birds, and likewing birds), also known as manman (Chinese: 蠻蠻), are birds with one eye and one wing each, that must attach to each other and fly in pairs. According to the ancient dictionary Erya, its proper name is jianjian (Chinese: 鶼鶼).

== Descriptions ==
From the ancient text Classic of Mountains and Seas (trans. Anne Birrell):

...There is a bird here which looks like a duck but it only has one wing and one eye. It can only fly if it and another bird join together. Its name is the southwild [manman]. Whenever it appears, there will be severe floods over all under the sky.

— Book Two, The Classic of the Western Mountains, Chapter 3.

...The country of Likewingbird lies to its east. These birds are green and scarlet. The birds fly in twos, wings to wings. One author says that this country lies east of Mount South.

— Book Six, The Classic of Regions Beyond the Seas: The South.

== Cultural significance ==
Biyiniao appeared in Han and Goguryeo tomb art, and has evolved into a popular cultural symbol of steadfast affection. The famous poem "Changhenge" or "Song of Everlasting Regret" by Bai Juyi (772–846), which retells the love story between Emperor Xuanzong of Tang and his consort Yang Yuhuan, invoked this metaphor, as did poetry by Cao Zhi (192–232) and Chen Weisong (1626–1682). For example, the last four lines of a Cao Zhi poem read:

山川阻且遠
別促會日長
願為比翼鳥
施翮起高翔

—from "Seeing off Mr. Ying, No. 2" (送應氏 其二)
Translation:

The mountains and rivers are rugged and distant;
Parting hastens and our reunion is far off.
I wish that we were linked-wing birds,
Spreading our wings to rise and soar aloft.

—translated by Robert Joe Cutter

== See also ==
- Mandarin ducks, another symbol of conjugal love in Chinese culture
- Conjoined twins
