= Classic of Mountains and Seas =

Chinese classic and compilation of myth

- Scrollable pages from volume five of the Classic of Mountains and Seas, a Ming dynasty (1368–1644) woodblock printed edition
- Traditional Chinese: 山海經
- Simplified Chinese: 山海经
- Literal meaning: "Classic of Mountains and Seas"
Transcriptions
Standard Mandarin
- Hanyu Pinyin: Shānhǎi jīng
- Wade–Giles: Shan^{1}-hai^{3} ching^{1}
- IPA: [ʂán.xàɪ.tɕíŋ]
Yue: Cantonese
- Yale Romanization: Sāan-hói gīng
- Jyutping: Saan^{1}-hoi^{2} ging^{1}
- IPA: [san˥ hɔj˧˥ kɪŋ˥]

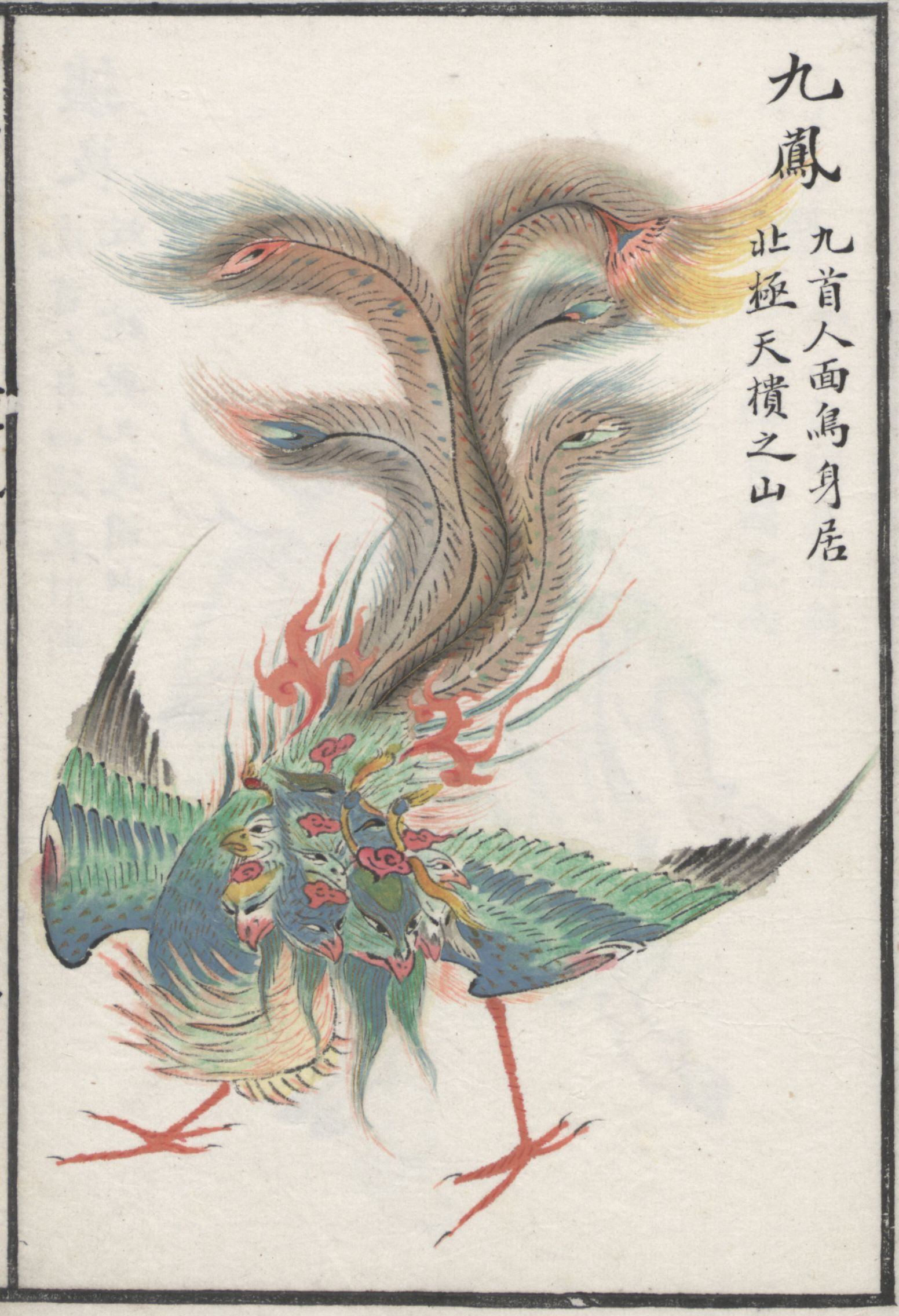
Classic of Mountains and Seas illustration of a nine-headed phoenix (colored Qing dynasty edition)

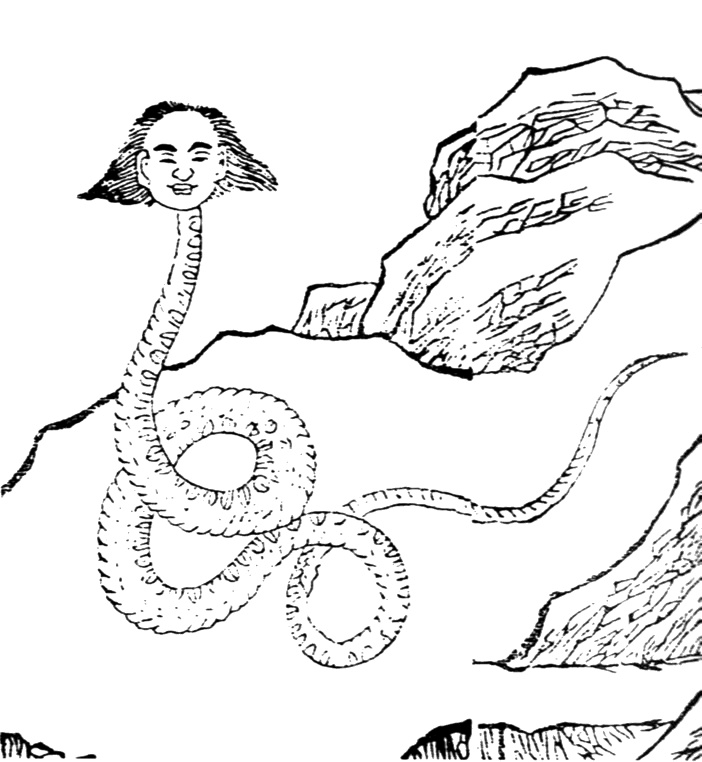
Classic of Mountains and Seas illustration of Nüwa

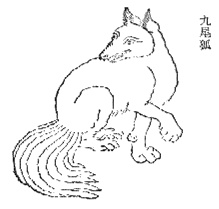
Classic of Mountains and Seas illustration of Nine-tailed Fox, companion of the Queen Mother of the West

The Classic of Mountains and Seas, also known as Shanhai jing (Chinese: 山海经), formerly romanized as the Shan-hai Ching, is a Chinese classic text and a compilation of mythic geography and beasts. Early versions of the text trace back to the 4th century BCE, but the present form was not reached until the early Han dynasty. The book is divided into eighteen sections; it describes over 550 mountains and 300 channels. It is largely a fabulous geographical and cultural account of pre-Qin China as well as a collection of Chinese mythology.

== Authorship ==
Since Sima Qian, the debate about the author(s) of the book has been going on for more than two thousand years.

=== Definite references ===
==== Yu the Great and Boyi ====
The earliest records of the Classic of Mountains and Seas can be found in Sima Qian's "Records of the Grand Historian - Biography of Dawan". The author of the book was first clearly identified in "The table of the Classic Mountains and Seas" written by Liu Xiu in the Western Han dynasty. Liu Xiu believed that the Classic of Mountains and Seas was written by Yu the Great and Boyi, during the classical era around Xia dynasty.

Wang Chong and Zhao Ye in the Eastern Han dynasty also identified the author as Boyi in their works, and was modified by later generations in the process of spreading. In Zhao Ye's Spring and Autumn Annals of Wu and Yue, Guo Pu's Preface of Classic Mountains and Seas, and Yan Zhitui's The Yan Family's instructions,' all of them supported the idea that the book's authors are Yu the Great and Boyi.

However, scholars after the Tang dynasty raised doubts about the authenticity of assigning the book's authors to Yu the Great and Boyi. Chen Zhensun's Zhizhai Bibliography, Zhu Xi's Annotations on Chu Ci: Dialectical Differentiation of Chu Ci, Hu Yinglin's Shaoshi Mountain Room Pen Cluster and others have acknowledged that it is a book written during the classical era, but it is not written by Yu the Great and Boyi. Many people also believe that the book was written by the descendants according to a map, which is the text description of the map named "Mountains and Seas".

==== During the Warring States period ====
Zhu Xi from the Southern Song dynasty and Hu Yinglin from Ming dynasty believed that the book was written by an author during the Warring States period. Hu Yinglin recorded in his Shaoshi Mountain Room Pen Cluster that the book was by "a curious man in the Warring States period", based on the books Tale of King Mu, Son of Heaven and Tian Wen.

==== Combination of different authors ====
On the basis of summarizing the research achievements of the previous dynasties scholars, Bi Yuan of the Qing dynasty further proposed that different sections of the book were written separately by different authors. He claimed that the "Mountains Classic" was written by Yu the Great and Boyi, the "Overseas Classic" and "Inside Seas Classic" were written by people from the Qin dynasty, and the "Great Farmland Classic" was produced when Liu Xiu revised it.

==== Zou Yan ====
Moving to the 20th century, some scholars put forward that the author of the book was Zou Yan in the Warring States period. This theory originated from Liu Shipei, who in his research on "A Study of Zou Yan's Theory on the Plurality of Literature in the Western Han Dynasty" inferred that, according to records in Mozi, the book Biographic of the Great Yu was a combined version of Records of the Grand Historian: Biography of Dawan and the Classic of Mountains and Seas, which supports the idea that the book was written by Zou Yan.

==== Sui Chaozi ====
In addition, some scholars also believe that the author of the book was a disciple of Mozi, named Sui Chaozi, during the Warring States period.

== Overview ==
The book is not a narrative, as the "plot" involves detailed descriptions of locations in the cardinal directions of the Mountains, Regions Beyond Seas, Regions Within Seas, and Wilderness. The descriptions are usually of medicines, animals, and geological features. Many descriptions are very mundane, and an equal number are fanciful or strange. Each chapter follows roughly the same formula, and the whole book is repetitious in this way.

It contains many short myths, which rarely exceed a paragraph. A famous ancient Chinese myth from this book is that of Yu the Great, who spent years trying to control the deluge. The account of him is in the last chapter, chapter 18, in the 2nd to last paragraph (roughly verse 40). This account is a much more fanciful account than the depiction of him in the Classic of History.

== Nature ==
=== Literary nature ===
Earlier Chinese scholars referred to it as a bestiary, but apparently assumed it was accurate. In fact, the information in the book is mythological. It is not known why it was written or how it came to be viewed as an accurate geography book.

Ancient Chinese scholars also called it an encyclopedia of geographical knowledge and a strange work with the most myths that records ancient China's "history, philosophy, mythology, religion, medicine, folklore, and ethnicity", reflecting a wide range of cultural phenomena and also involving "geography, astronomy, meteorology, medicine, animals, plants, minerals ..."

Contemporary academia has three main different arguments for the nature of the book:

1. The Myth Theory represented by Yuan Ke. Some academies consider the Classic of Mountains and Seas to be "the only surviving work that preserves the most ancient Chinese mythological materials".
2. The Novel Theory represented by Li Jianguo. Some agree with Complete Library of the Four Treasuries's classification of the Classic of Mountains and Seas, defining it as a "novel".
3. A majority of contemporary scholars believe it is primarily a geography book.

=== Historical nature ===
- From Han dynasty to Tang dynasty

During this period, the contents of the book were considered authentic and reliable. All the mountains, rivers, strange objects and creatures recorded in the book are credible.

- From Ming dynasty to Qing dynasty

Through this period, the book was regarded as a fictional work. Due to people's increasing cognition of the world and the prevalence of novels in the Ming dynasty and Qing dynasty, the credibility of the Classic of Mountains and Seas gradually decreased. More people started to believe in the Novel Theory.

- From the Late Qing dynasty to present

During this period, researchers gave the book different orientations according to various research directions and theories. Due to the introduction of Western anthropology, folklore/ etc., many scholars regarded the book as a synthesis of various disciplines, using it as a reference for analysis and summarizations.

== Field achievement ==
=== Geography ===
1. The Classic of Mountains and Seas systematically and comprehensively records the geographical overview of the Qin dynasty period. It provides future generations with information on the ecological environment and human activities thousands of years ago.
2. It includes information about ancient lakes, swamps, wetlands, deserts, mountains, and rivers; mineral distribution, plant distribution (recording climate changes), animal distribution, ethnic tribe communication and migration.

=== Mythology ===
1. The book records seven categories of ancient Chinese mythology.
2. It leaves a reliable textual basis for the mythical world and expresses the cosmology of the ancient Chinese people in the form of metaphors.

=== Zoology ===
1. The book records a list of supernatural beings in Chinese folklore.
2. The book records the migration, evolution, and extinction of more than 400 ancient Chinese animals. It describes animals' dynamics and living habits (including their sounds, characteristics, and attributes) for future generations' research and studies.

=== Medicine ===
1. For Traditional Chinese medicine, the Classic of Mountains and Seas records approximately 110–140 kinds of drugs with medicinal values. It provides evidence for the similarities and differences between ancient and modern diseases, the statistical quantity of animal and plant medicine materials, and the research on plants for both food and medicine.
2. While introducing the names, forms, origins, and functions of various drugs, the book puts forward a large number of ancient disease names, so that these ancient disease names can be preserved.

=== Religion ===
1. The book describes and reveals ancient Chinese religious consciousness and ideas. For example, from the descriptions of various strange mountains and rocks, mysterious creatures, and immortal supernatural beings, scholars discover the characteristics, beliefs and attribution of Chinese shamanism.

== Notable Mythological Beasts in Shanhai jing ==
The mythological creatures first described in Shanhai jing appear in many historical and modern stories and art based on Chinese mythology, for example the Ba snake, the Bi Fang bird, the qiongqi ("thoroughly odd", one of the Four Perils), the tiangou (heavenly dog), the zouyu, etc.

== English translations ==
Title	Publication Date	ISBN
The Classic of Mountains and Seas by Anne Birrell (Paperback)	January 1, 2001	978-0140447194
A Chinese Bestiary: Strange Creatures from the Guideways Through the Mountains and Seas by Richard Strassberg	June 17, 2002 (Hardcover); November 4, 2008 (Paperback)	978-0520218444 (Hardcover); 978-0520298514 (Paperback)
Fantastic Creatures of the Mountains and Seas: A Chinese Classic by Jiankun Sun, Siyu Chen, Howard Goldblatt (Hardcover)	June 1, 2021	978-1950691388

== See also ==
- Bai Ze – titular figure of the lost treatise on demonology which has similarities to some of the Shanhaijing.
- Chinese mythological geography
- Shi Yi Ji (拾遺记) by Wang Jia – a 4th-century work containing "apocryphal" versions of some of the stories in the Classic of Mountains and Seas.
