= Fenghuang (disambiguation) =

The Fenghuang is a mythological bird of East Asia similar to the Phoenix.

Fenghuang may also refer to:

- Fenghuang, Miluo (凤凰乡), a township in Miluo City, Hunan province, China
- Fenghuang Airport (disambiguation)
- Fenghuang County, in Hunan, China
- Fenghuang Mountain (disambiguation), several mountains in China
- Shanghai SH760, a 1958 car originally called 'Fenghuang'
- Fenghuang, a villain in Kung Fu Panda: Legends of Awesomeness

== See also ==
- Fenghuangcheng Subdistrict, a subdistrict of Fengcheng, Liaoning, China
- Huang Feng, Hong Kong based film director
