= Fenghuang =

Mythological birds in Sinosphere traditions

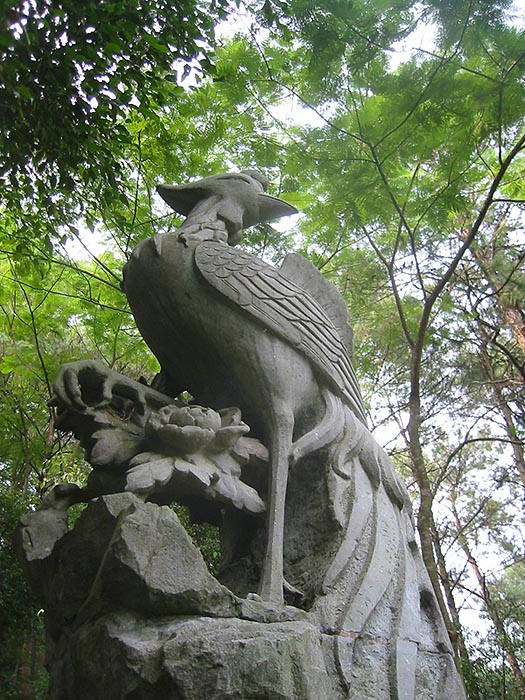
- Fenghuang sculpture in Nanning, Guangxi

Creature information
- Other name: Chinese phoenix
- Grouping: Mythical creature
- Sub grouping: Phoenix
- Folklore: Chinese mythology

Origin
- Country: China, Japan, Korea, Vietnam

Chinese name
- Traditional Chinese: 鳳凰
- Simplified Chinese: 凤凰
- Hanyu Pinyin: fènghuáng
Transcriptions
Standard Mandarin
- Hanyu Pinyin: fènghuáng
- Bopomofo: ㄈㄥˋ ㄏㄨㄤˊ
- Gwoyeu Romatzyh: fenqhwang
- Wade–Giles: fêng^{4}-huang^{2}
- Tongyong Pinyin: fònghuáng
- IPA: [fə̂ŋ.xwǎŋ]
Wu
- Romanization: vonwaon, bonwaon
Gan
- Romanization: fung5uong4
Hakka
- Romanization: fung55fong11
Yue: Cantonese
- Yale Romanization: fuhngwòhng
- Jyutping: fung6-wong4
- IPA: [fʊŋ˨.wɔŋ˩]
Southern Min
- Hokkien POJ: hōnghông
Middle Chinese
- Middle Chinese: bɨung^{H}hwang

Vietnamese name
- Vietnamese alphabet: Phượng hoàng; Phụng hoàng; Vietnamese pronunciation: [fɨəŋ˧ˀ˩ hwaŋ˨˩]

Korean name
- Hangul: 봉황
Transcriptions
- Revised Romanization: bonghwang
- McCune–Reischauer: ponghwang

Japanese name
- Hiragana: ほうおう
Transcriptions
- Romanization: hōō

Fenghuang (/fʌŋˈwɑːŋ/ fung-HWAHNG) are mythological birds featuring in traditions throughout the Sinosphere. Fenghuang are understood to reign over all other birds: males and females were originally termed feng and huang respectively, but a gender distinction is typically no longer made, and fenghuang are generally considered a feminine entity to be paired with the traditionally masculine Chinese dragon.

In the West, they are commonly called Chinese phoenixes, although mythological similarities with the Western/Persian phoenix are superficial.

== Appearance ==
Image of the fenghuang opposite the dragon on the Twelve Symbols national emblem, which was the state emblem of China from 1913 to 1928

A common depiction of fenghuang was of it attacking snakes with its talons and its wings spread. According to the Erya's chapter 17 Shiniao, fenghuang is made up of the beak of a rooster, the face of a swallow, the forehead of a fowl, the neck of a snake, the breast of a goose, the back of a tortoise, the hindquarters of a stag and the tail of a fish. Today, however, it is often described as a composite of many birds including the head of a golden pheasant, the body of a mandarin duck, the tail of a peacock, the legs of a crane, the mouth of a parrot, and the wings of a swallow.

The fenghuang's body symbolizes the celestial bodies: the head is the sky, the eyes are the sun, the back is the moon, the wings are the wind, the feet are the earth, and the tail is the planets. The fenghuang is said to have originated in the sun. Its body contains the five fundamental colors: black, white, red, yellow, and green or blue. It sometimes carries scrolls or a box with sacred books. It is sometimes depicted with a fireball. It is believed that the bird only appears in areas or places that are blessed with utmost peace and prosperity or happiness.

Chinese tradition cites it as living atop Mount Danzuan in the southern mountains.

== Origin ==
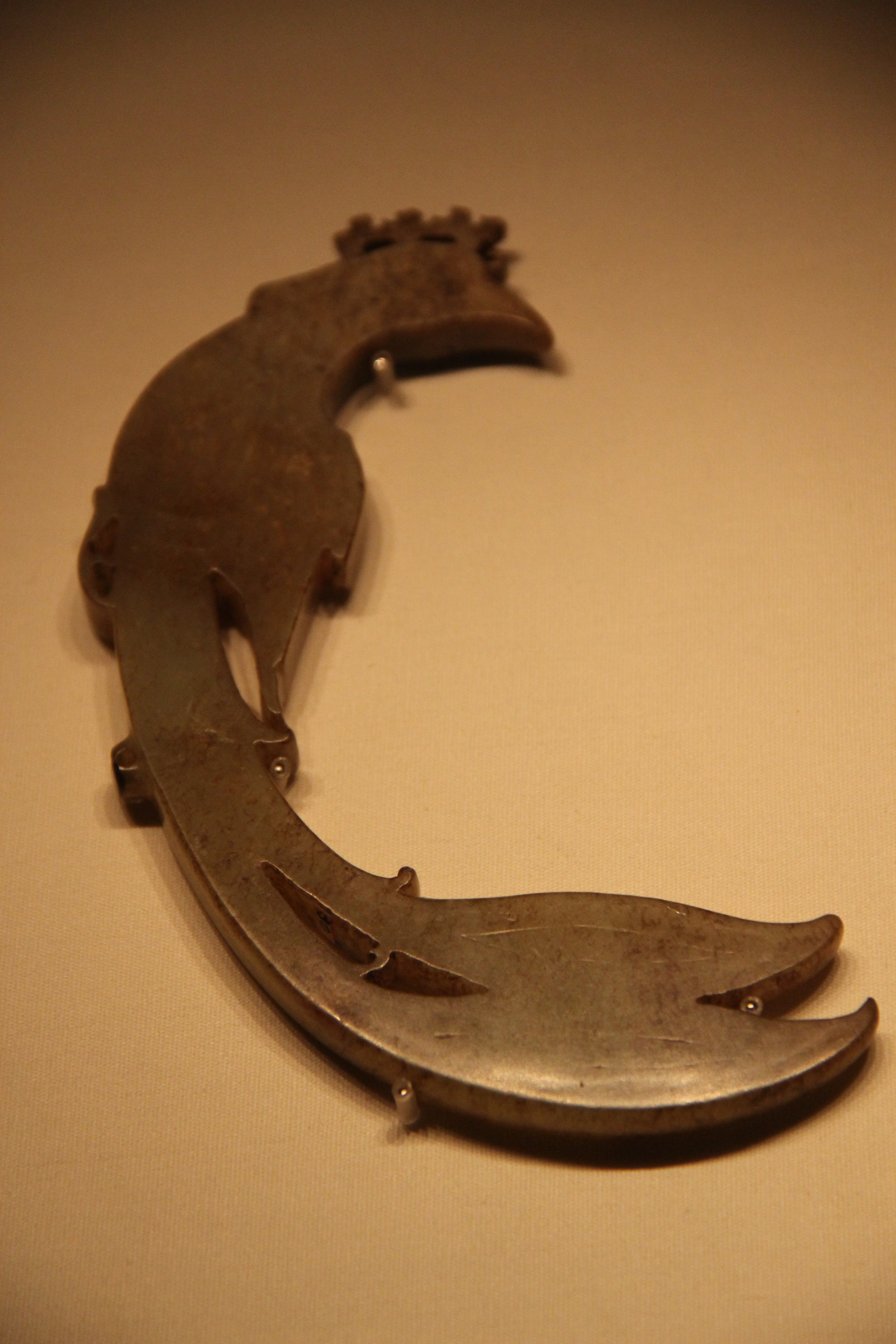
Jade fenghuang, unearthed from the tomb of Fu Hao, c. 1200 BC, Shang dynasty.

The earliest known ancient fenghuang design dates back to about the 7th millennium BC and was discovered in Hongjiang, Hunan Province, at the Gaomiao Archeological Site.

The earliest known form of a dragon-fenghuang design, on the other hand, dates back to the Yangshao culture (c. 5000 – c. 3000 BC) and was found at an archeological site near Xi'an in Shaanxi Province. The ancient usage of fenghuang and dragon designs are all evidence of an ancient form of totemism in China.

During the Shang dynasty, phoenix and dragon images appear to have become popular as burial objects. Several archeological artifacts of jade fenghuang and jade dragons were unearthed in tombs dating from the Shang dynasty period. The Xuanniao seen in Zhou dynasty poetry about the Shang people are implied, and in Shuowen Jiezi, glossed, as male Fenghuang (simply "Feng").

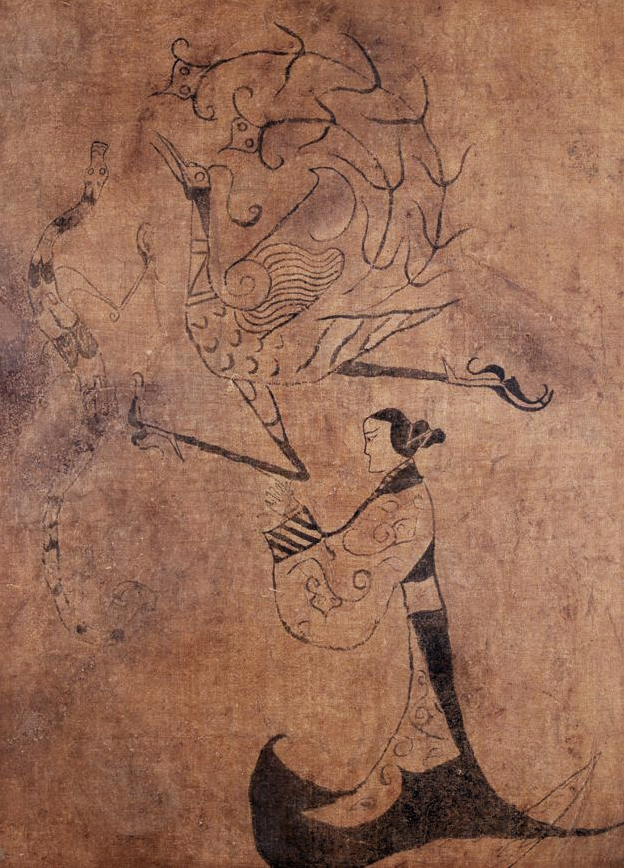
A fenghuang (top) and dragon (left), Silk Painting of a Human Figure with Phoenix and Dragon, Silk painting unearthed from a Chu tomb during Zhou dynasty (100BC-250BC).

During the Spring and Autumn period (c. 771 – c. 476 BC) and the Warring States period, the combination of dragon-fenghuang designs together became a common form of unearthed artifacts. One such artifact is the Silk Painting of Human Figure with Dragon and Phoenix from the Hunan Museum.

In the Qin dynasty (221–206 BC), fenghuang hairpins (i.e. hairpins with fenghuang decorations) and shoes which were also decorated with fenghuang designs were supposed to be worn by the Imperial concubines of the Qin Emperor.

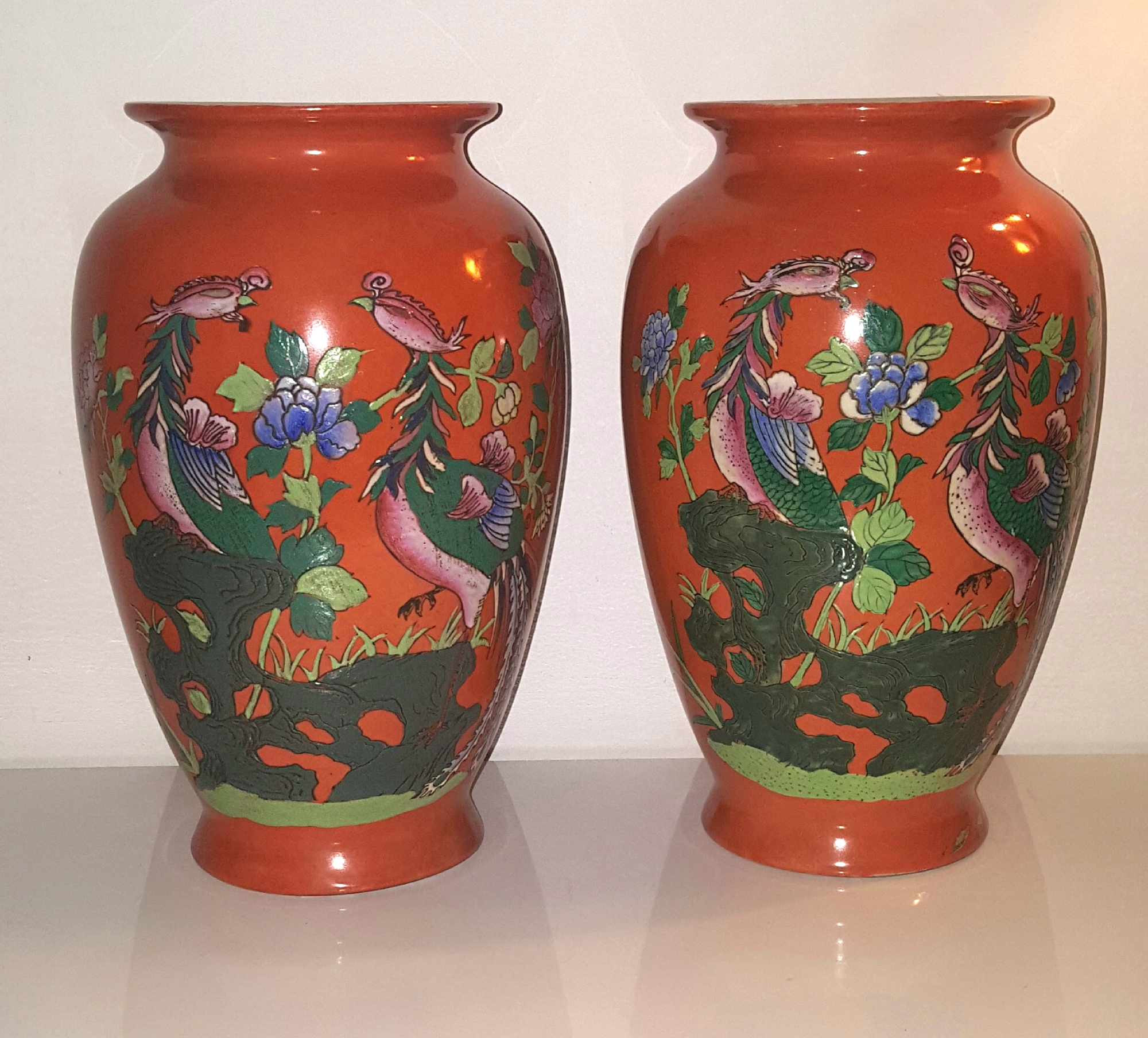
A pair of Chinese Fenghuang (鳳凰) vases. Each vase depicts the male bird, "Feng" and the female bird, "Huang" facing one another, representing their harmonious relationship. The pair also represent the concept of "Yin" and "Yang".

During the Han dynasty (2,200 years ago) two fenghuang, one a male (feng, 鳳) and the other a female (huang, 凰) were often shown together facing one another. In the Han dynasty, an imperial edict decreed that the fenghuang hairpins had to become the formal headpiece for the empress dowager and the imperial grandmother.

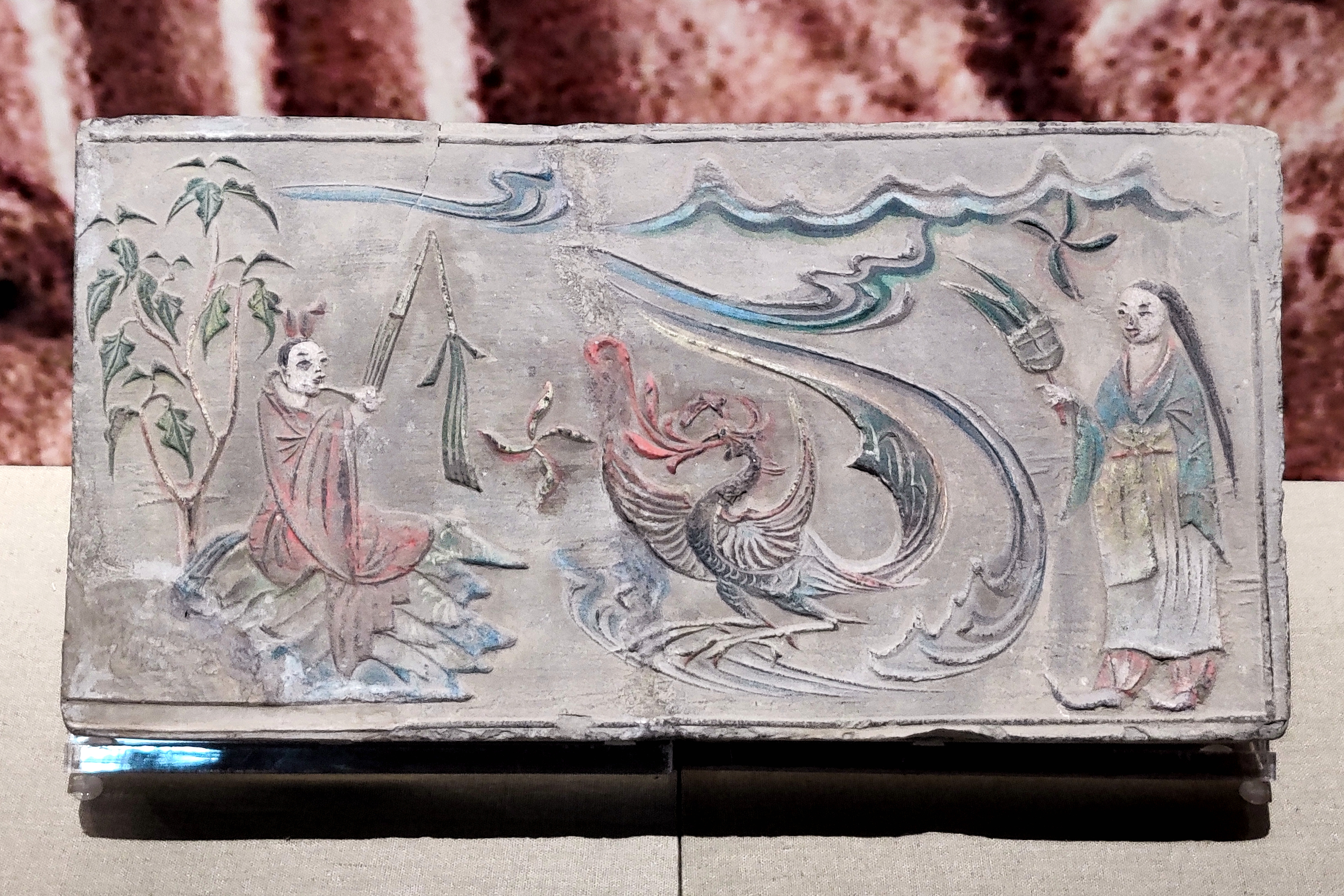
Man playing sheng to a fenghuang, Dengzhou painted stone-relief, Liu Song dynasty.

Later, during the Yuan dynasty the two terms were merged to become fenghuang, but the "King of Birds" came to symbolize the empress when paired with a dragon representing the emperor.

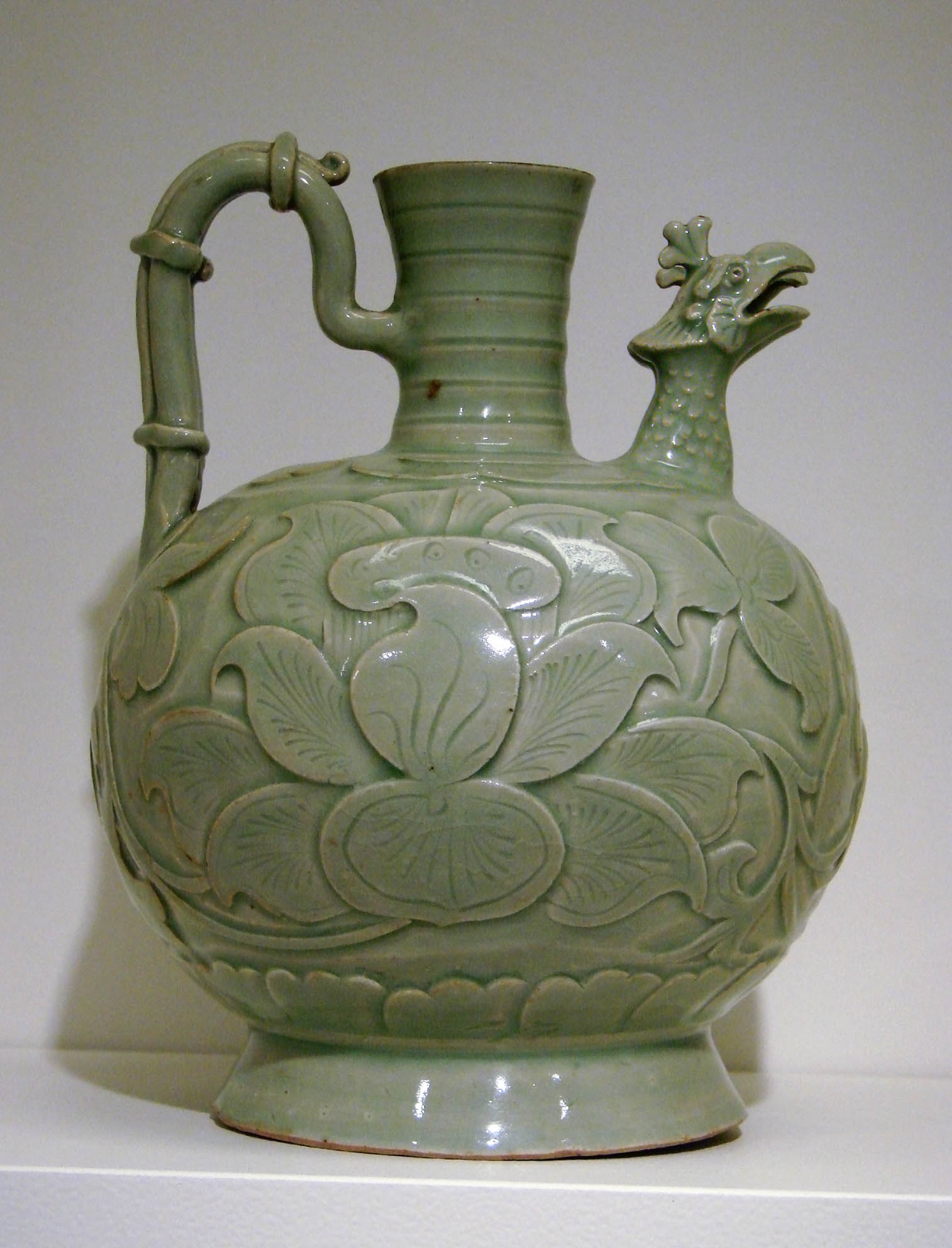
A vase with a fenghuang-headed spout, gray sandstone with celadon coating, Song Dynasty, last half of 10th century.

From the Jiajing era (1522–1566) of the Ming dynasty onwards, a pair of fenghuang was differentiated by the tail feathers of the two birds, typically together forming a closed circle pattern – the male identified by five long serrated tail feathers or "filaments" (five being an odd, masculine, or yang number) and the female by what sometimes appears to be one but is in fact usually two curling or tendrilled tail feathers (two being an even, feminine, or yin number). Also during this period, the fenghuang was used as a symbol representing the direction south. This was portrayed through a male and female facing each other. Their feathers were of the five fundamental colors: black, white, red, green, and yellow. These colours are said to represent Confucius' five virtues:

1. Ren: the virtue of benevolence, charity, and humanity;
2. Yi: honesty and uprightness; Yì may be broken down into zhōng, doing one's best, conscientiousness, loyalty and shù: the virtue of reciprocity, altruism, consideration for others
3. Zhi: knowledge
4. Xin: faithfulness and integrity;
5. Li: correct behavior, propriety, good manners, politeness, ceremony, worship.

The fenghuang represented power sent from the heavens to the Empress. If a fenghuang was used to decorate a house it symbolized that loyalty and honesty were in the people that lived there. Or alternatively, a fenghuang only stays when the ruler is without darkness and corruption (政治清明).

=== Etymology ===
Linguist Wang Li relates element 鳳, OC:*‍bums (ZS), mod. fèng to 鵬, OC:*‍bɯːŋ (ZS) "peng, fabulous great bird"; 鳳 is also related to *plum, OC:*‍風, mod. fēng "wind".

Historical linguist Marc Miyake reconstructs 鳳凰, OC:*‍N-prəm-s ɢʷˁɑŋ, mod. fènghuáng, which he proposes, though with uncertainty, to be the affixed form of 風皇, OC:*‍prəm [ɢ]ʷˁɑŋ (B&S), mod. fēng huáng "wind sovereign".

== Symbolism ==
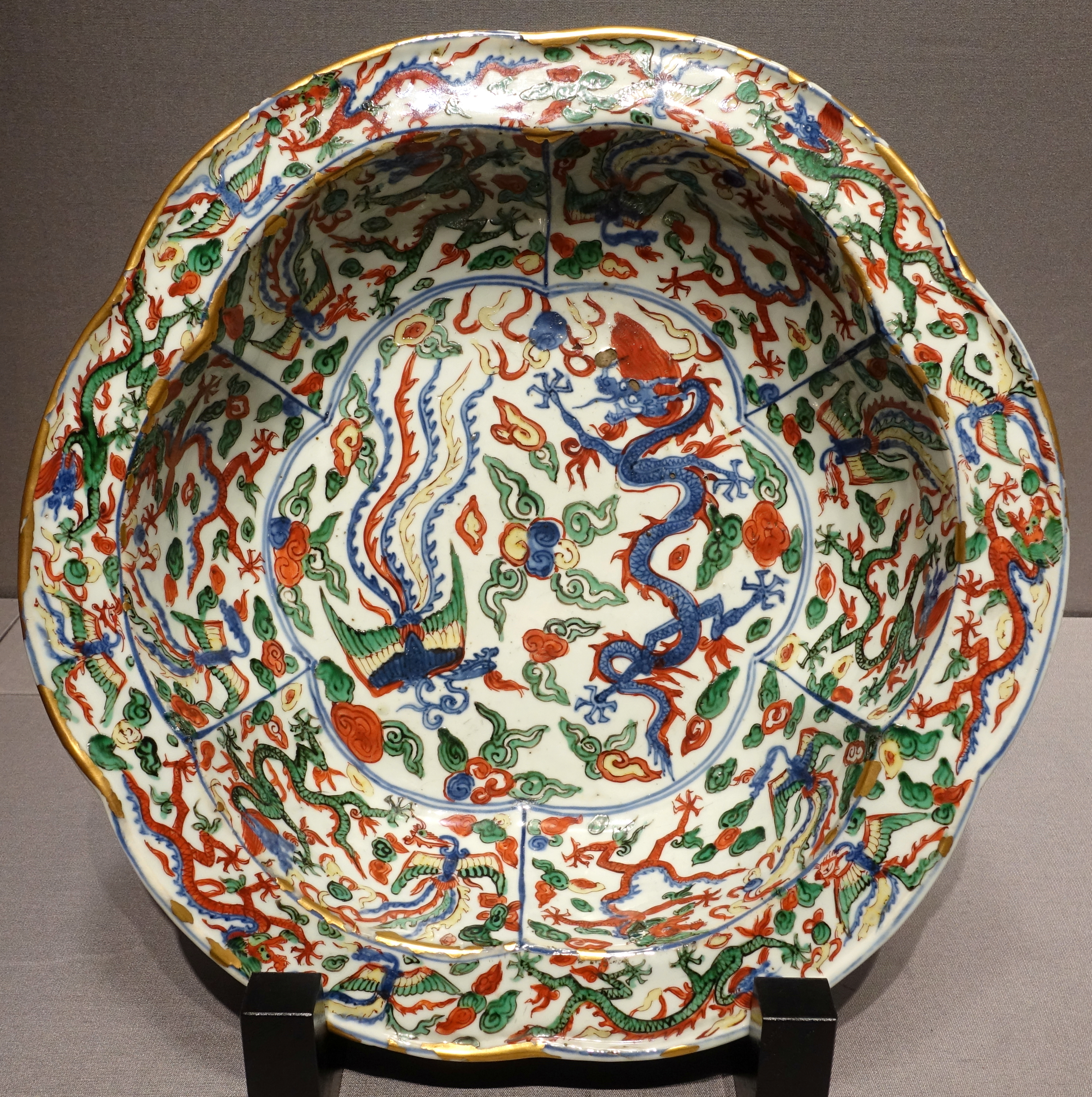
Basin with dragon and fenghuang design, Jingdezhen ware, China, Ming dynasty, Wanli era, 1573-1620 AD. Tokyo National Museum

The fenghuang has positive connotations. It is a symbol of virtue and grace. The fenghuang also symbolizes the union of yin and yang. The first chapter of the Classic of Mountains and Seas , the "Nanshang-jing", states that each part of fenghuang's body symbolizes a word. The head represents virtue (德), the wing represents duty (義), the back represents propriety (禮), the abdomen represents credibility (信) and the chest represents mercy (仁).

The fenghuang originally consisted of a separate male feng and a female huang as symbols of yin and yang. The male feng represented the yang aspect while the huang represented the yin aspect; and together, the feng and huang image was symbolic of love between husband and wife. However, since the Qin dynasty, the fenghuang progressively went through a feminization process as the dragon became a symbol of masculinity. Eventually, the feng and the huang merged into a single female entity.

In ancient and modern Chinese culture, fenghuang can often be found in the decorations for weddings or royalty, along with dragons. This is because the Chinese considered the dragon-and-fenghuang design symbolic of blissful relations between husband and wife, another common yang and yin metaphor. In some traditions, it appears in good times but hides during times of trouble, while in other traditions it appeared only to mark the beginning of a new era. In China and Japan, it was a symbol of the imperial house, and it represented "fire, the sun, justice, obedience, and fidelity".

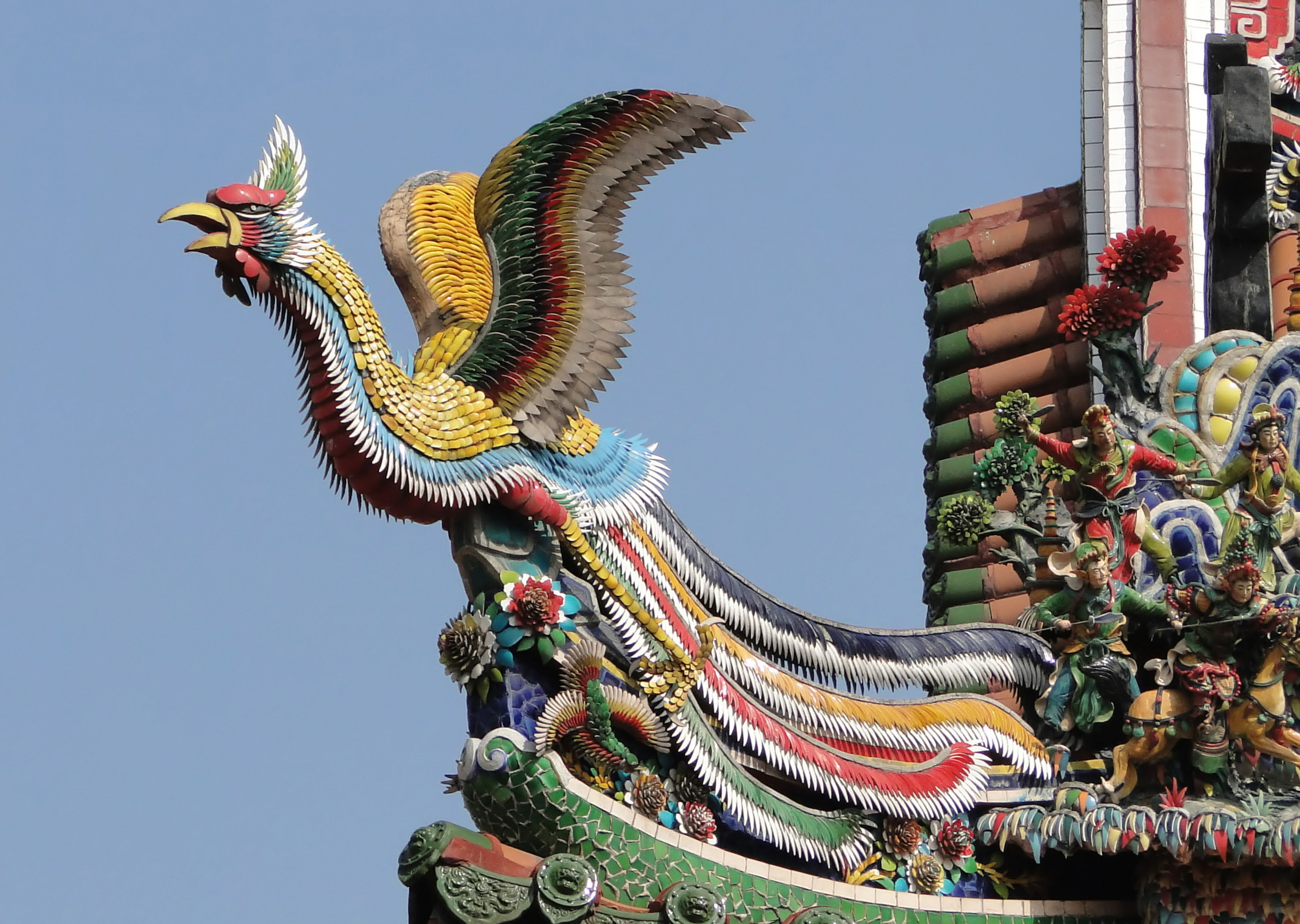
A fenghuang on the roof of Longshan Temple in Taipei

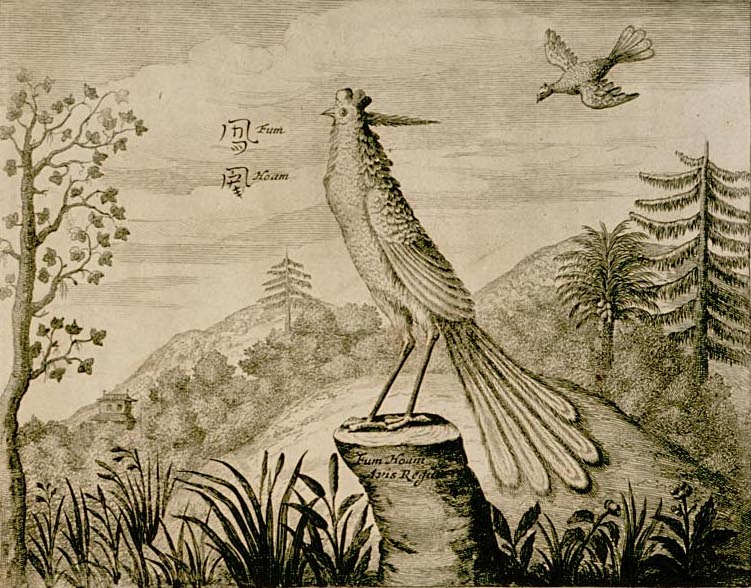
Drawing of a Fum Hoam (fenghuang) by a Dutch man, circa 1664.

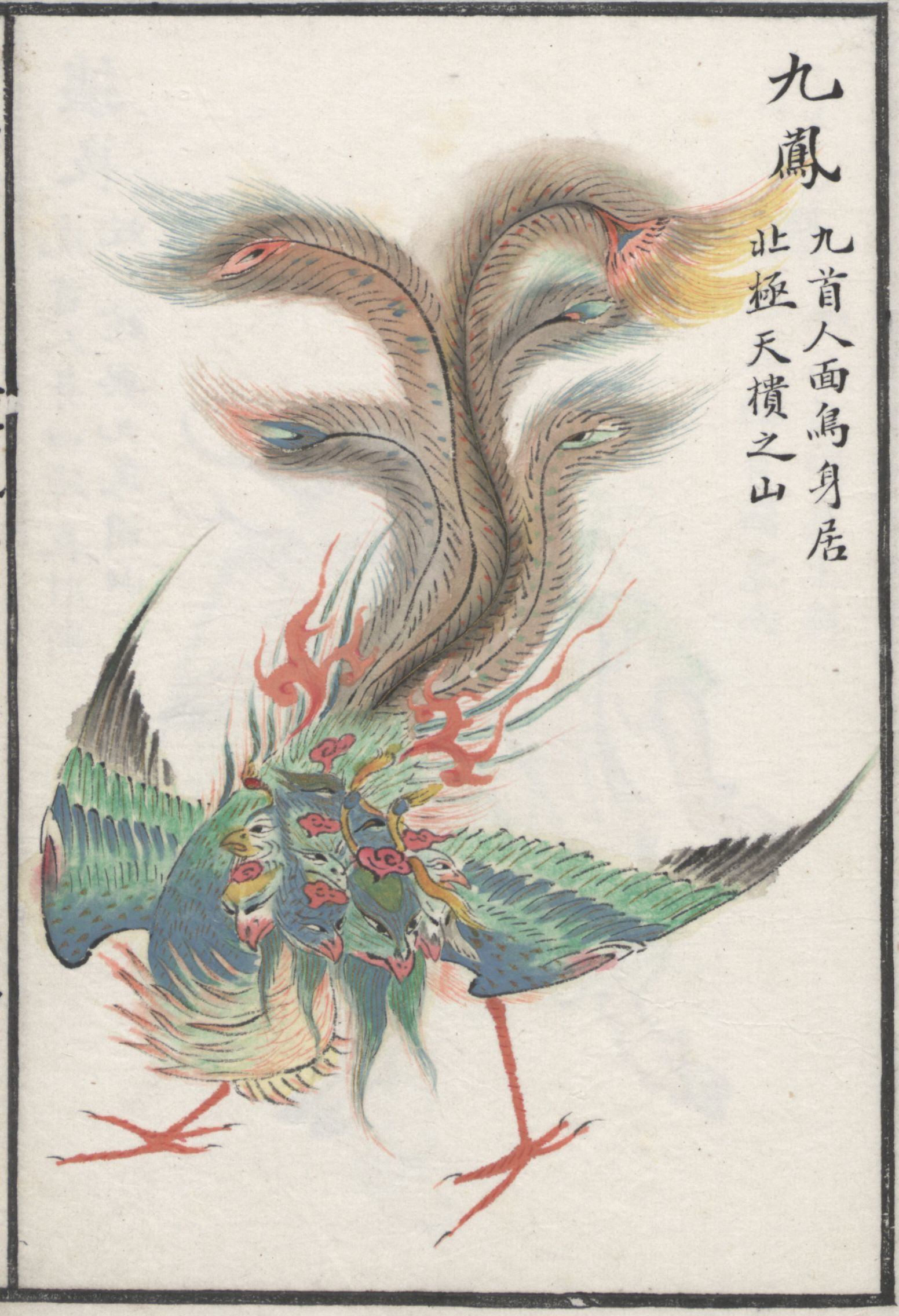
Classic of Mountains and Seas illustration of a nine-headed fenghuang (colored Qing Dynasty edition)

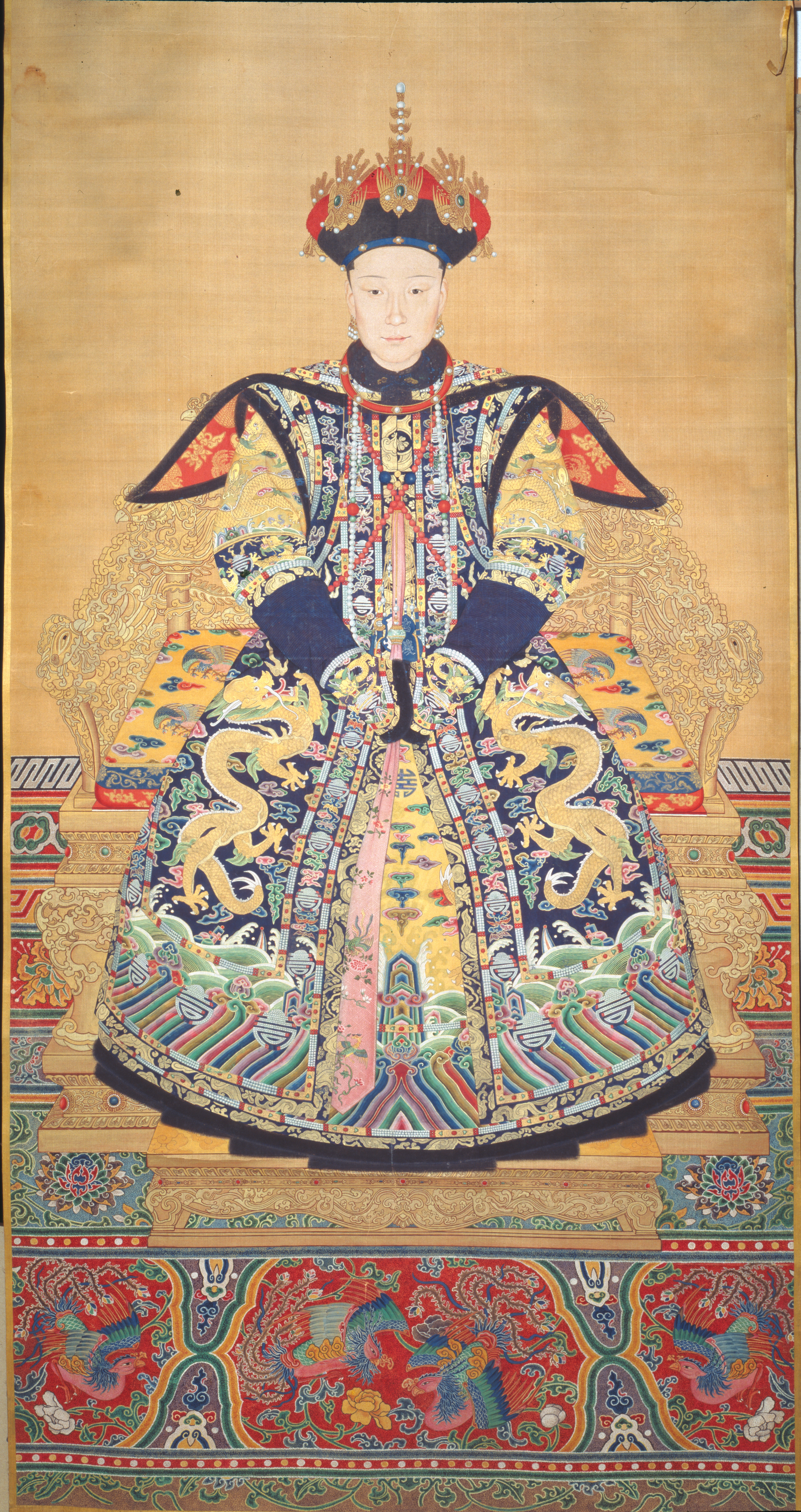
Portrait of an empress, possibly Empress Xiaoxianchun, (wife of the Qianlong Emperor) sitting on a chair decorated with fenghuang

== Modern usage ==
The fenghuang is still used in modern Japan and Korea in relation to the head of state:

- Japan: The Hōō (ほうおう, [hoːoꜜː], the Japanese pronunciation of 鳳凰) is associated with the Japanese Imperial family. The large difference between hō-ō and feng-huang is due to Chinese vowels with ng usually being converted to ō in go-on reading. Examples include:
  - The actual Imperial throne Takamikura (高御座) is adorned by numerous Hōōs.
  - The Imperial regalia Kōrozen no Gohō (黄櫨染御袍) is embroidered numerous textile patterns including a pair of Hōō.
  - Various Japanese stamps and currency, such as the back of the current series E (2004) ¥10,000 note.
  - Toyota's flagship vehicle favored by the Japanese Imperial family and high Japanese government officials, the Toyota Century, uses the Hōō as an identifying emblem.
- Korea: two bonghwang (봉황, Korean pronunciation of 鳳凰) are used in the symbol of the Korean President. They are also appeared on the national seal. Historically the bonghwang was used for queens and empresses.

Other uses include:

- Fèng or Fènghuáng is a common element in given names of Chinese women (likewise, "Dragon" is used for men's names).
- "Dragon-and-fenghuang infants" (龍鳳胎; 龙凤胎) is a Chinese term for a set of male and female fraternal twins.
- Fenghuang is a common place name throughout China. The best known is Fenghuang County in western Hunan, southern China, formerly a sub-prefecture. Its name is written with the same Chinese characters as the mythological bird.
- Phoenix talons (鳳爪; 凤爪) is a Chinese term for chicken claws in any Chinese dish cooked with them.
- The Vermilion Bird, (Suzaku in Japanese) one of the Four Symbols of Chinese myth, sometimes equated with the fenghuang.
- The Chinese University of Hong Kong (CUHK) uses it in its emblem to symbolize nobility, beauty, loyalty and majesty.
- Phoenix Television (鳳凰衛星電視) is a Hong Kong-based media company
- Typhoon Fung-wong has been used to name five tropical cyclones. The name was contributed by Hong Kong and is the Cantonese pronunciation of fenghuang.
- The hōō (Korean: bonghwang (봉황)) is a valuable card in hanafuda, traditional Japanese playing cards that are also popular in Korea and formerly in Hawaii. It is the light card (光札, hikari-fuda) of the paulownia suit, which is associated with the month of December in Japan and Hawaii, or November in Korea.
- When describing chinoiserie or authentic Asian ceramics and other artworks, English-speaking art historians and antique collectors sometimes refer to it as "hoho bird", a name derived from hōō, with a second extraneous h added. The Japanese also use the word fushichō for this image.

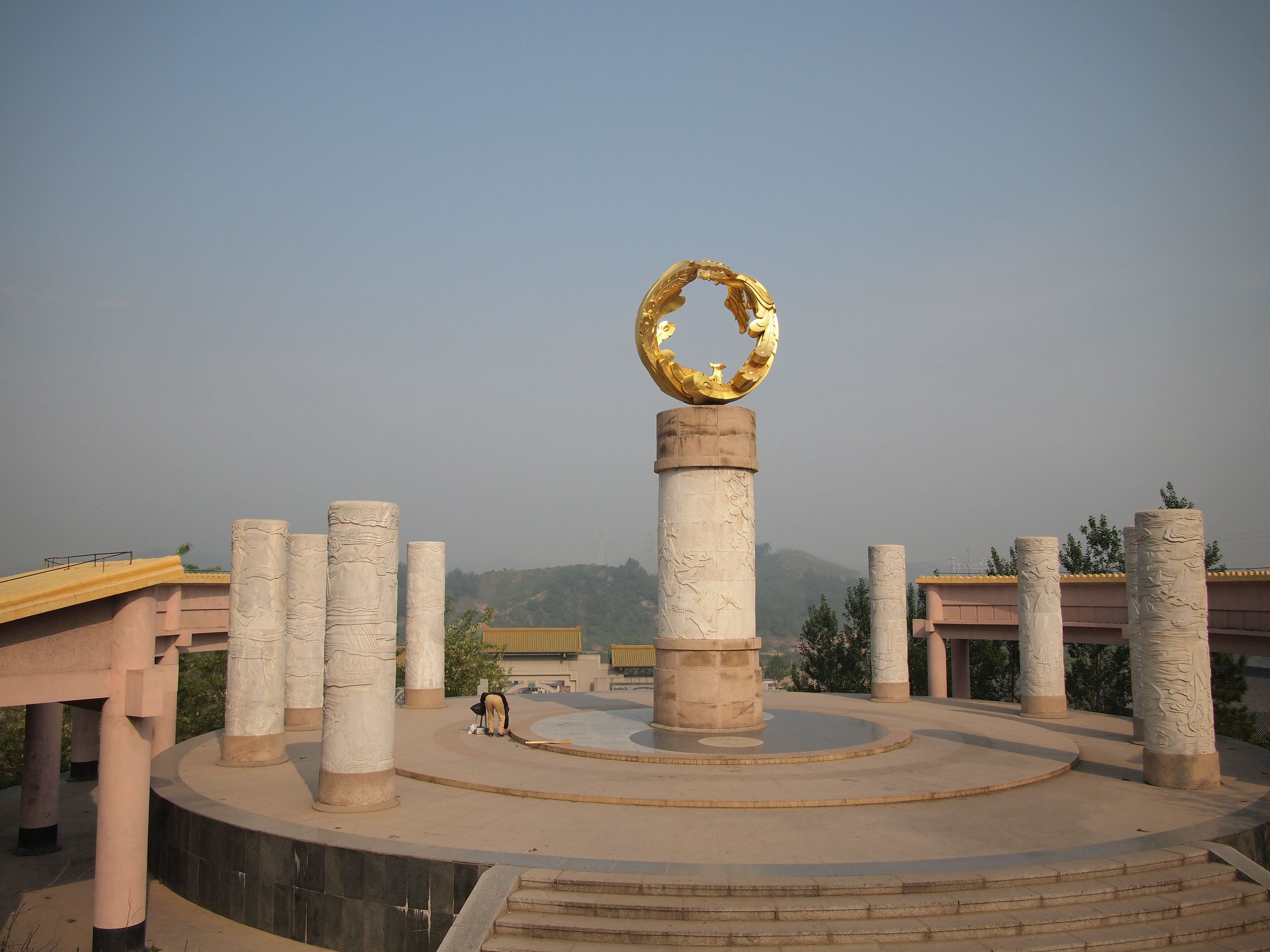
Fenghuang sculpture in Fenghuang mountain, Fengcheng.

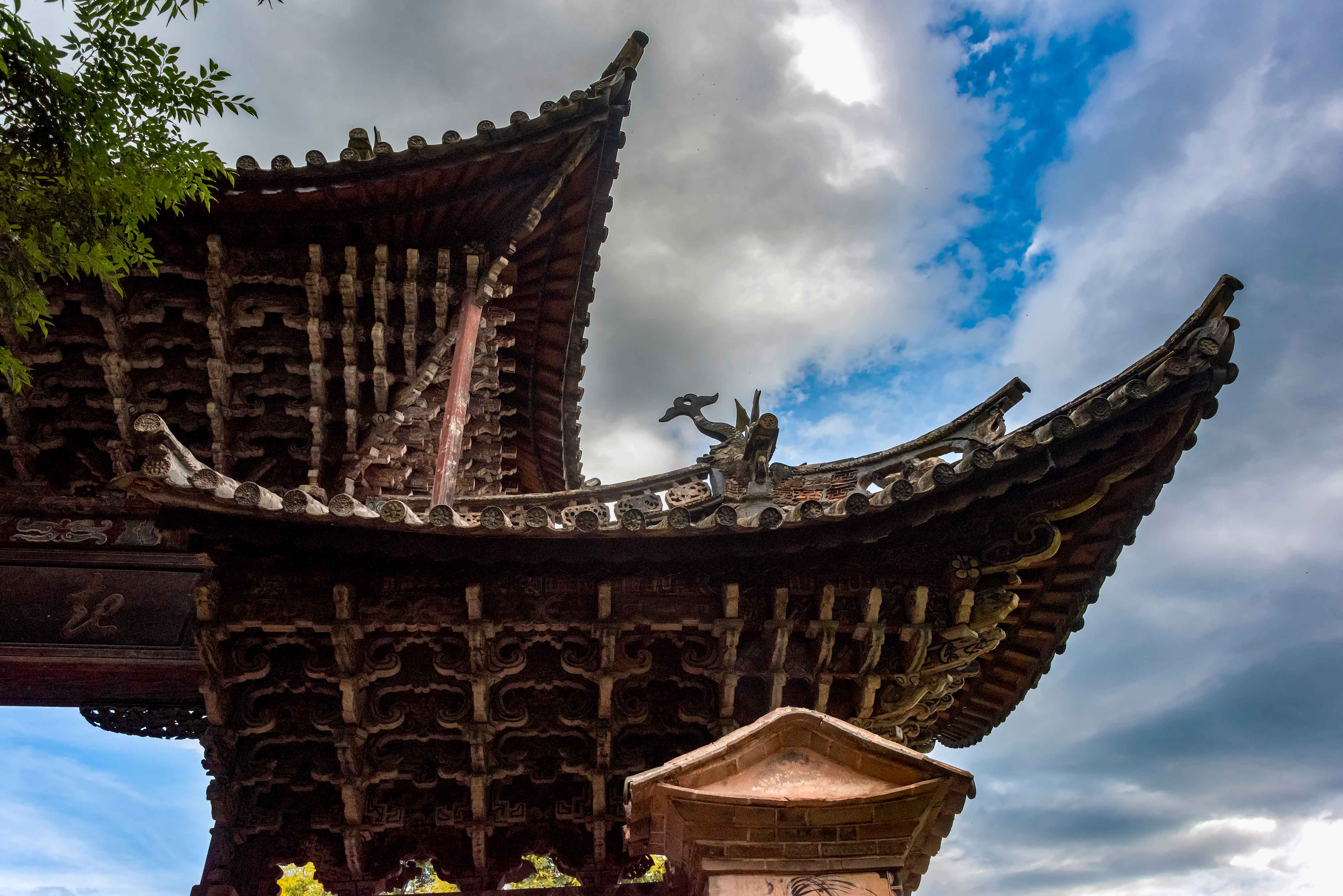
Dragon & Fenghuang Arch in China

Hōō sculpture on the Akasaka Palace

Seal of the South Korean President, with twin bonghwang emblem.

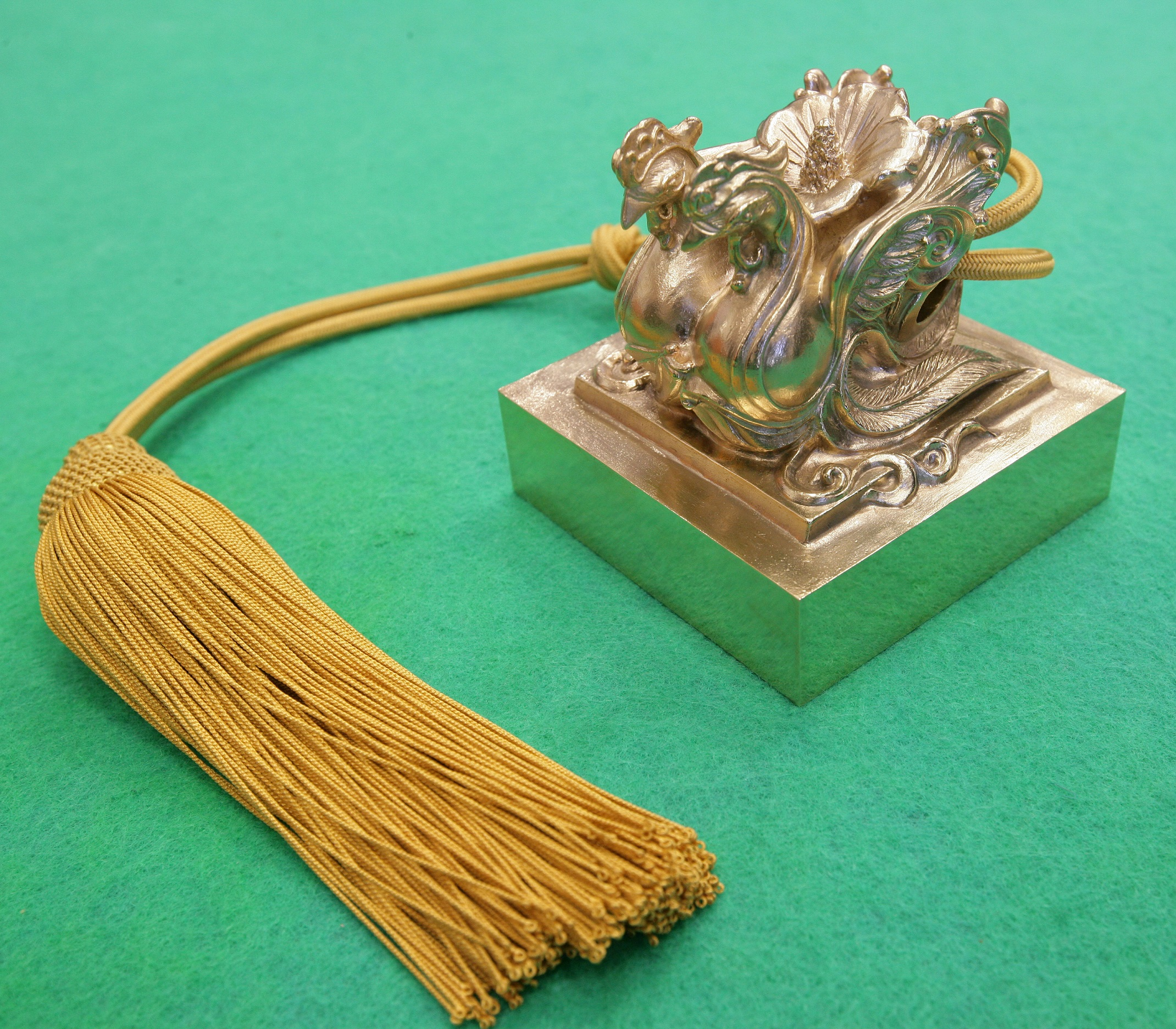
National seal of South Korea

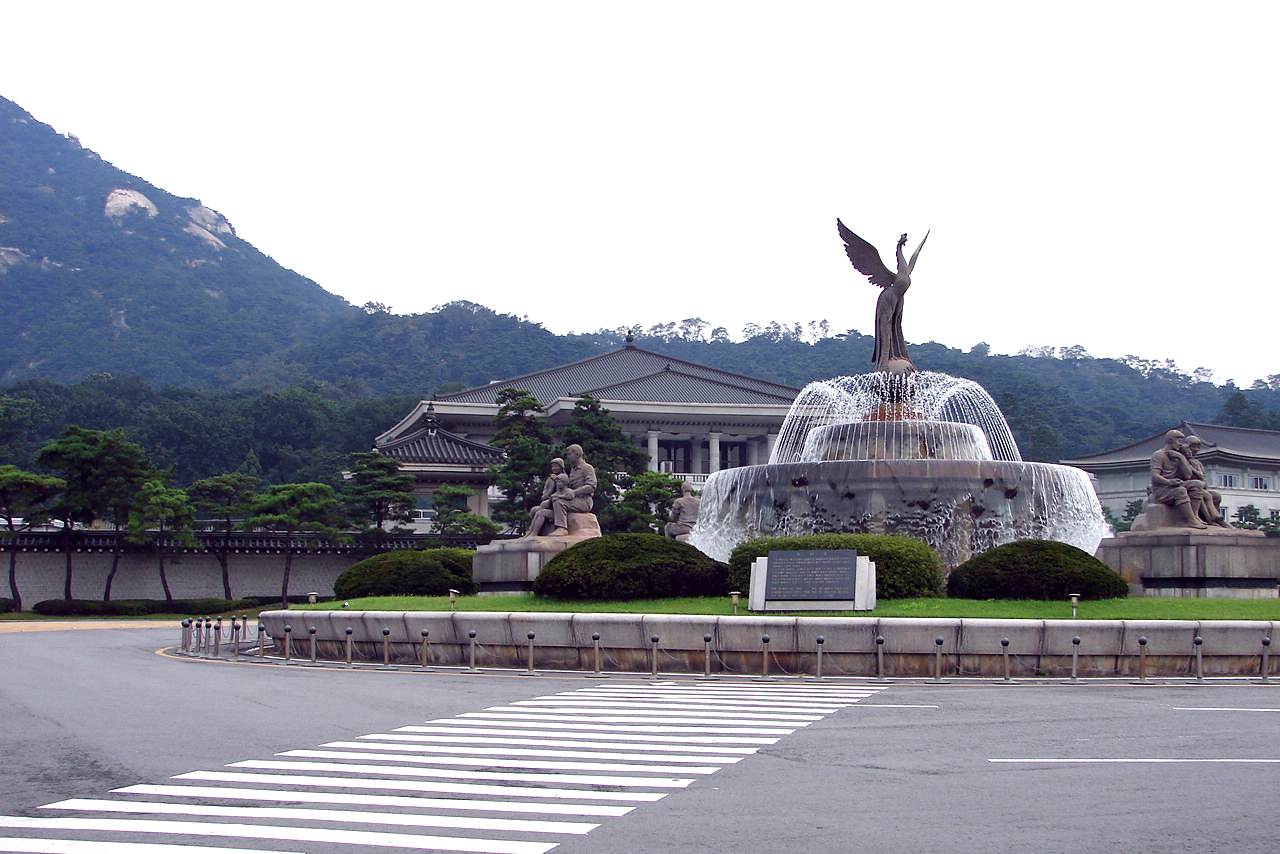
Bonghwang sculpture by the Blue House.

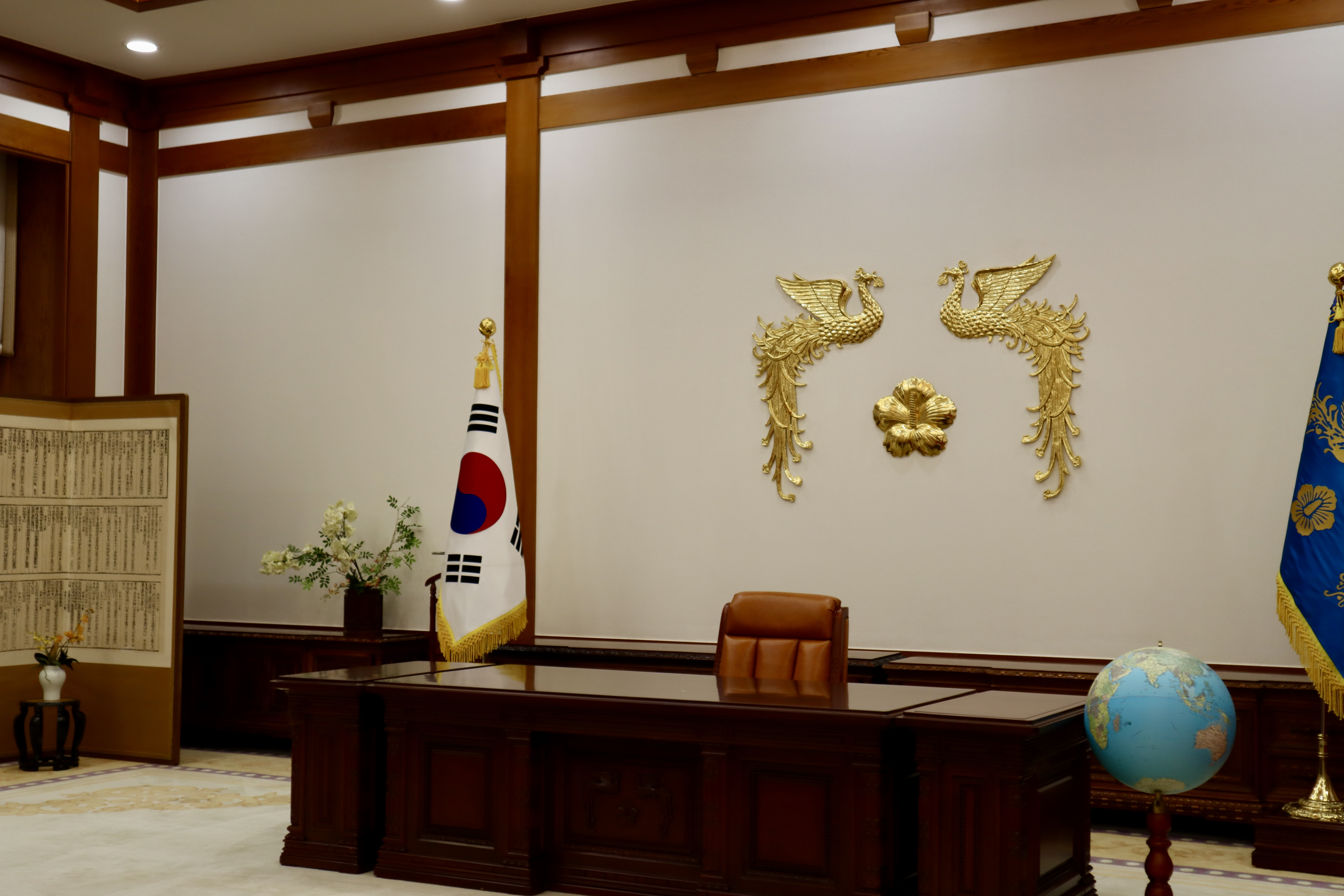
President's workspace in the Blue House

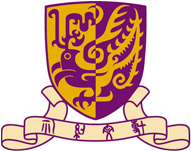
The emblem of CUHK is the mythical Chinese bird feng (鳳) which has been regarded as the Bird of the South since the Han dynasty. It is a symbol of nobility, beauty, loyalty and majesty. The University colours are purple and gold, representing devotion and loyalty, and perseverance and resolution, respectively.

A playing card in hanafuda, depicting a hōō over a paulownia flower.

== See also ==
- Birds in Chinese mythology
- Byōdō-in – Buddhist temple in Kyoto Prefecture, Japan
- Byodo-In Temple – Memorial park located on Oʻahu, Hawaiʻi, US
- Chinese mythology – Mythology of the greater Chinese area
- Zhuque - Chinese mythical bird, often mistaken for Fenghuang
- Firebird – Magical glowing bird in Slavic folklore
- Four Holy Beasts – Four sacred animals in Chinese mythology
- Garuda – Eagle-like demigod in Hindu mythology
- Huma bird – Mythical bird of Iranian mythology
- Lạc bird – Mythical creature in Vietnamese culture
- Phoenix (manga) – Japanese manga series by Osamu Tezuka
- Phoenix Mountain – Mountain in Hangzhou, China
- Roc (mythology) – Legendary bird in Middle Eastern mythology
- Simurgh – Iranian mythological bird
- Turul – Hungarian mythological bird and national symbol
