= National symbols of Vietnam =

The national symbols of Vietnam are official and unofficial flags, icons or cultural expressions that are emblematic, representative or otherwise characteristic of Vietnam and of its culture.

== Symbol ==
Title	Name of Symbol	Picture
National flag	Flag of Vietnam	
National emblem	Emblem of Vietnam	
National motto	Độc lập – Tự do – Hạnh phúc "Independence – Freedom – Happiness"	
National anthem	Tiến Quân Ca composed by Văn Cao	Tiến Quân Ca
(Unofficial) National flower	Lotus (Nelumbo nucifera)	
(Unofficial) National tree	Buddha Belly Bamboo (Bambusa ventricosa)	
Legendary national bird	Lạc bird	
(Unofficial) National animal	Water buffalo (Bubalus bubalis)	
(Unofficial) National sport	Đá cầu	
(Unofficial) National dish	Phở	
