= Daxing, Dandong =

Daxing 大兴镇
- Town
- Location in Liaoning
- Coordinates: 40°44′3″N 124°14′7″E
- Country: People's Republic of China
- Province: Liaoning
- Prefecture-level city: Dandong
- County-level city: Fengcheng
- Time zone: UTC+8 (China Standard)

Daxing (simplified Chinese: 大兴; traditional Chinese: 大興; pinyin: Dàxīng) is a town under the administration of Fengcheng, Liaoning, China. As of 2018, it has six villages under its administration.
