= Phoenix Hill (Zhejiang) =

Mountain in Hangzhou, China

Coordinates: 30.22°N 120.15°E

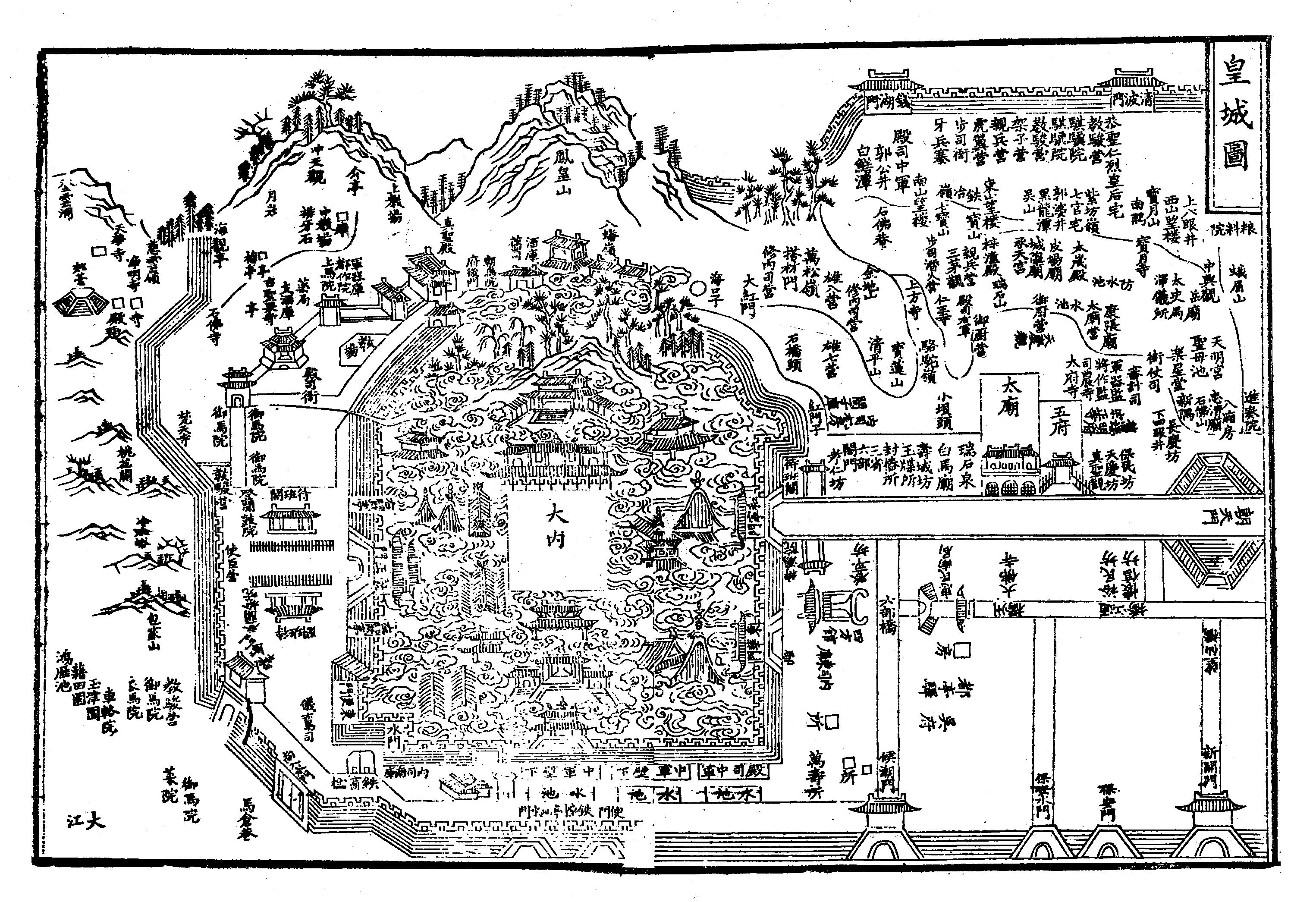
- The Song palace in Hangzhou
- Traditional Chinese: 鳳凰山
- Simplified Chinese: 凤凰山
Transcriptions
Standard Mandarin
- Hanyu Pinyin: Fènghuángshān
- Wade–Giles: Feng-huang Shan

Phoenix Hill, also known as Phoenix Mountain, Fenghuang Hill, Mt. Fenghuang, Fenghuangshan, etc., is a hill located on the edge of West Lake in Hangzhou, the capital of Zhejiang Province in eastern China. It is connected with the Wu Hills or Wushan (吴山) and is the highest point within the city.

According to Chinese legend, the mountain is the earthly remains of a mythical golden phoenix who, along with a jade dragon, had created a beautiful pearl which was subsequently stolen from them by the henchman of a queen goddess. In their attempt to rescue the pearl from the jealous queen, the pair cause the pearl to drop from heaven and turn into West Lake. The phoenix and dragon decided to remain beside it forever by becoming mountains.

The imperial palace of the Southern Song during the 12th & 13th centuries was located at the foot of the hill in Hangzhou's present-day Shangcheng District. The palace was destroyed in 1276, eleven years after the fall of the dynasty.

== See also ==
- Other Phoenix Hills and Mountains, mostly in China
