= Phoenix Mountain =

- Traditional Chinese: 鳳凰山
- Simplified Chinese: 凤凰山
Transcriptions
Standard Mandarin
- Hanyu Pinyin: Fènghuáng Shān
- Wade–Giles: Feng-huang Shan

Phoenix Mountain or Hill, also known in Chinese contexts as Mount Fenghuang or Fenghuangshan, may refer to:

== China ==
- Phoenix Mountain (Chaozhou), Guangdong, China
- Fenghuang Mountain (Shenzhen), Guangdong, China
- Phoenix Mountain (Hebei), China
- Phoenix Mountain (Liaoning), China
- Phoenix Hill (Shanxi), China
- Phoenix Mountain (Zhejiang), China
- Phoenix Hill Football Stadium, Chengdu, China

== United States ==
- Phoenix Mountains in Arizona, USA
- Phoenix Hill, Louisville, Kentucky, USA
