= Lạc bird =

Mythical creature in Vietnamese culture

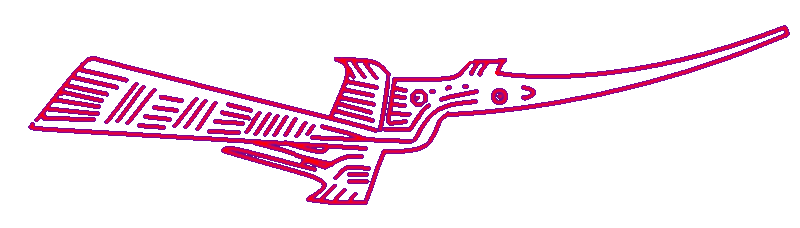
A rendition of the lạc bird, as recognized on the Dong Son drums

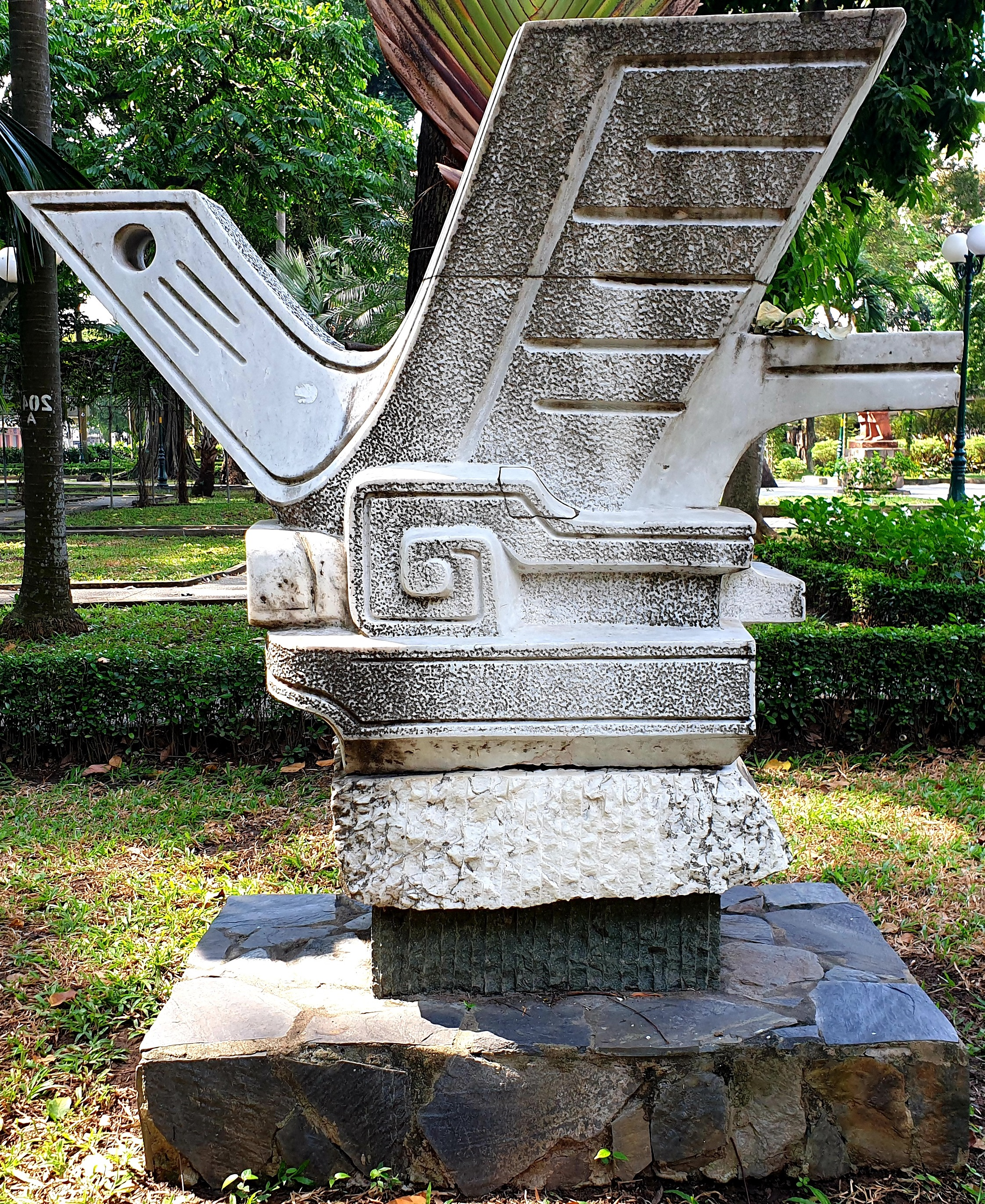
Stone plaque of a lạc bird at Tao Đàn Park, Ho Chi Minh City

Lạc bird (Vietnamese: chim lạc, lạc điểu, Chinese: 雒鳥) is a mythical creature in Vietnamese culture and a national bird of Vietnam.

== Appearance ==
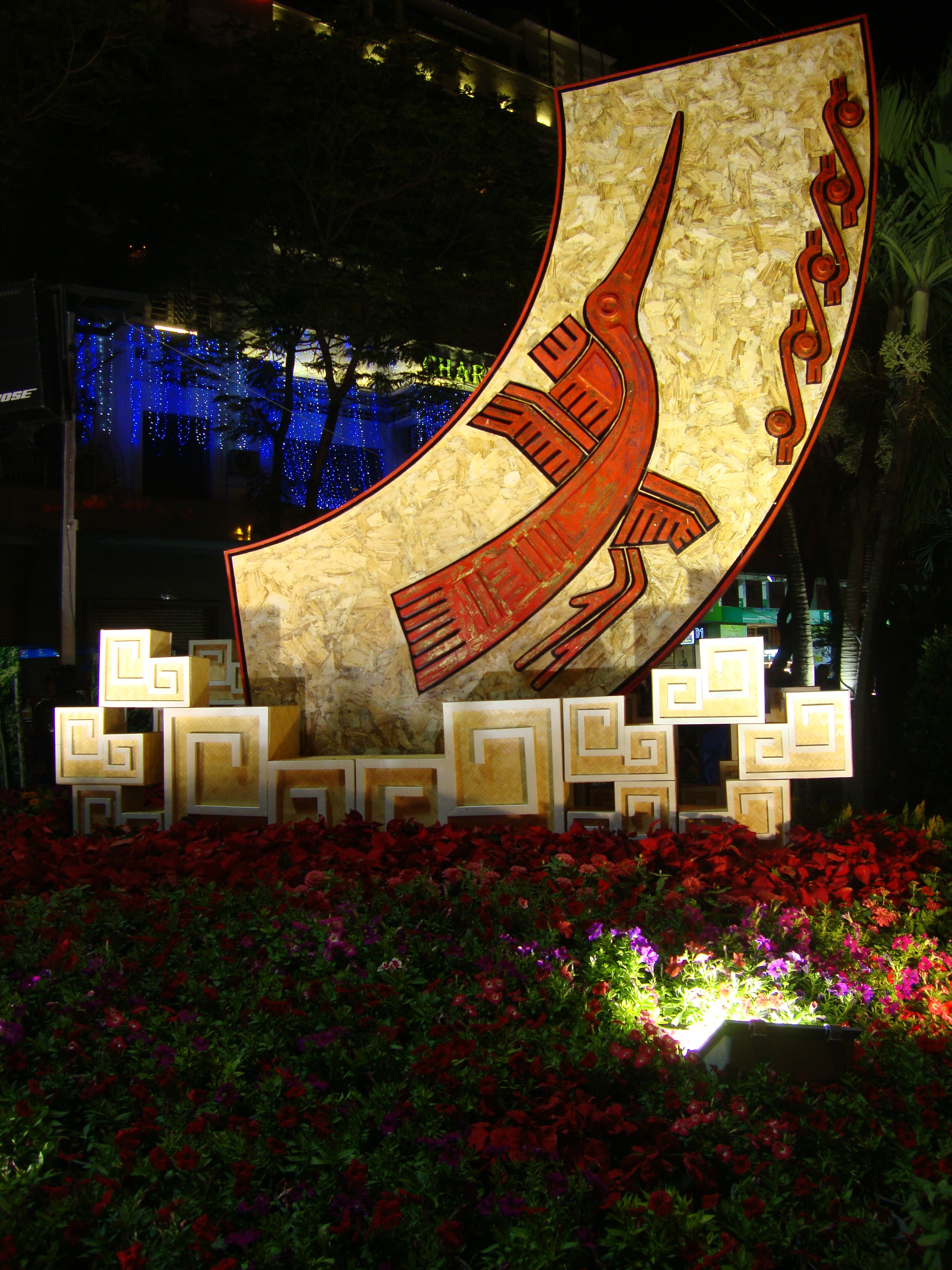
Image of a lạc bird at Nguyễn Huệ street, Ho Chi Minh City

The lạc bird is depicted with outstretched wings and a long beak. This image symbolizes the aspiration to conquering seemingly impossible challenges of the Vietnamese people.

== Terminology ==
The meaning of the word lạc itself is debatable. A theory suggests that it might come from the term "lạc điền", meaning waterfield, and so lạc bird would mean waterfield bird. The word is also translated as "lost" in modern Vietnamese language, which could be a metaphor to the Vietnamese history.

During the Hồng Bàng dynasty, the word lạc was used as part of different terms such as Lạc Việt (Luoyue), Lạc Vương (King of the Lạc), Lạc hầu (Marquis of the Lạc), Lạc tướng (General of the Lạc), and Lạc dân (Lạc people).

== Origin and species identification ==
Images of lạc bird appears on the surfaces of the Đông Sơn drums, one of the objects that were made thousands of years ago, during the era of Văn Lang-Âu Lạc. Despite its aged existence, it is still unclear as to what bird species the lạc bird truly depicts. Based on its appearance, the lạc bird could be another version of the Chinese Fenghuang, or a sketchy drawing of the stork, egret, crane, pelican, teal, or great hornbill.

== See more ==
- Fenghuang
- National symbols of Vietnam
- Vietnamese dragon
- Vietnamese mythology
