= Fenghuang Mountain (Shenzhen) =

Mountain in Bao'an District, Shenzhen, China

- Phoenix Mountain
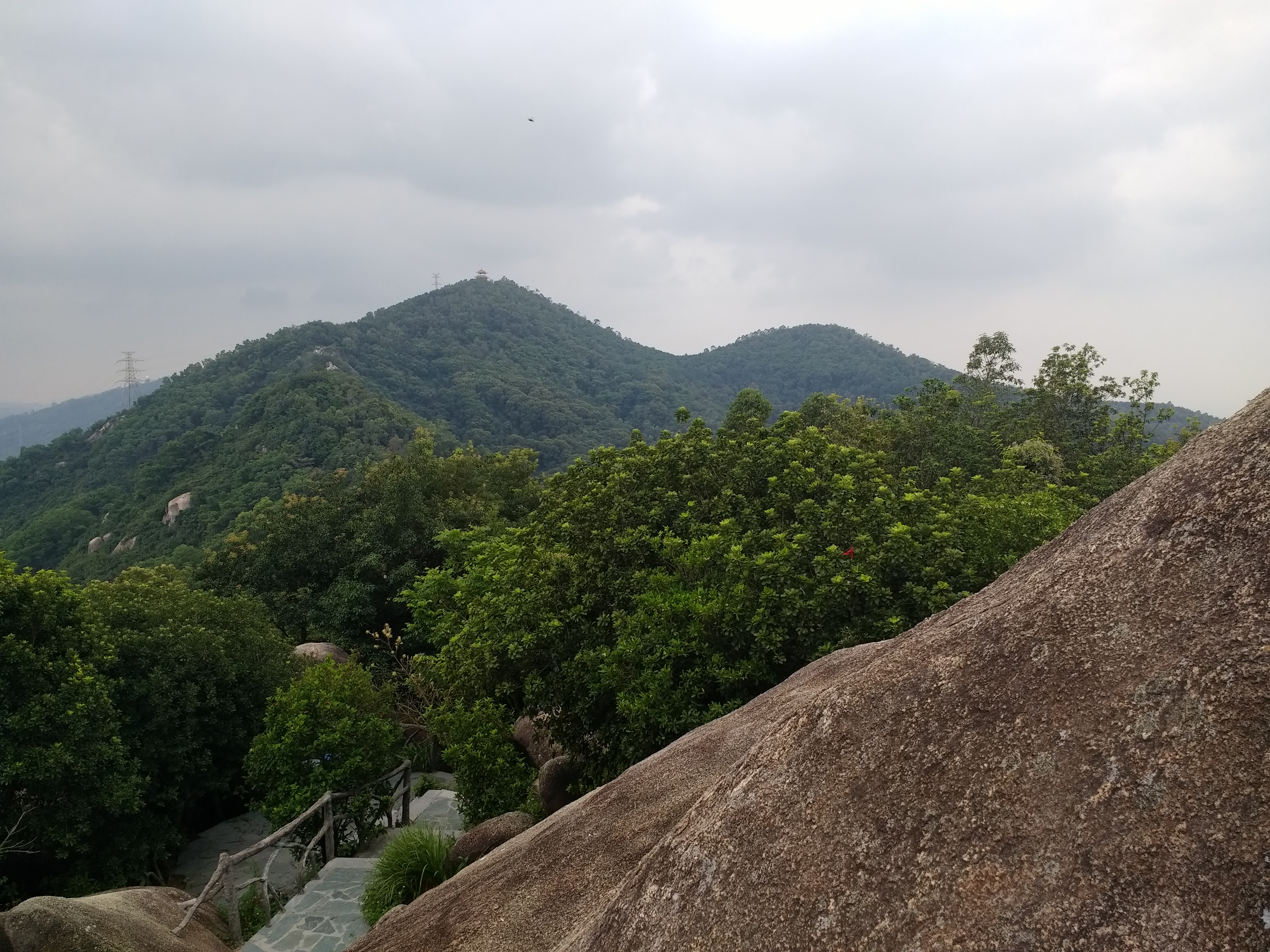

Highest point
- Elevation: 376 metres (1,234 ft)
- Coordinates: 22°40′16″N 113°50′53″E

Naming
- Native name: 凤凰山 (Chinese); Fènghuáng Shān (Chinese)

Geography
- Location: Bao'an District, Shenzhen, Guangdong, China

Fenghuang Mountain (simplified Chinese: 凤凰山; traditional Chinese: 鳳凰山; pinyin: Fènghuáng Shān; lit. 'Phoenix Mountain') is a low mountain range located east of the mouth of the Pearl River, in Bao'an District, Shenzhen, Guangdong, China. The ridge forms a crescent shape, and its highest peak reaches an altitude of about 376 meters. It is protected as a forest park of Bao'an District. Partway up the western part of the mountain, at an altitude of 190 meters, there is a Buddhist temple, Fengyan Temple (凤岩古庙), which receives many worshippers on public holidays. At the foot of the mountain to the southwest is Shenzhen Bao'an International Airport as well as some of Shenzhen's main transportation arteries, National Highway 107 and the Guangshen Expressway. To the southeast is Tiegang Reservoir (铁岗水库), a source of drinking water for Bao'an District. On a 300-meter peak at the southern end of the range is a television transmission tower.

== Geography ==
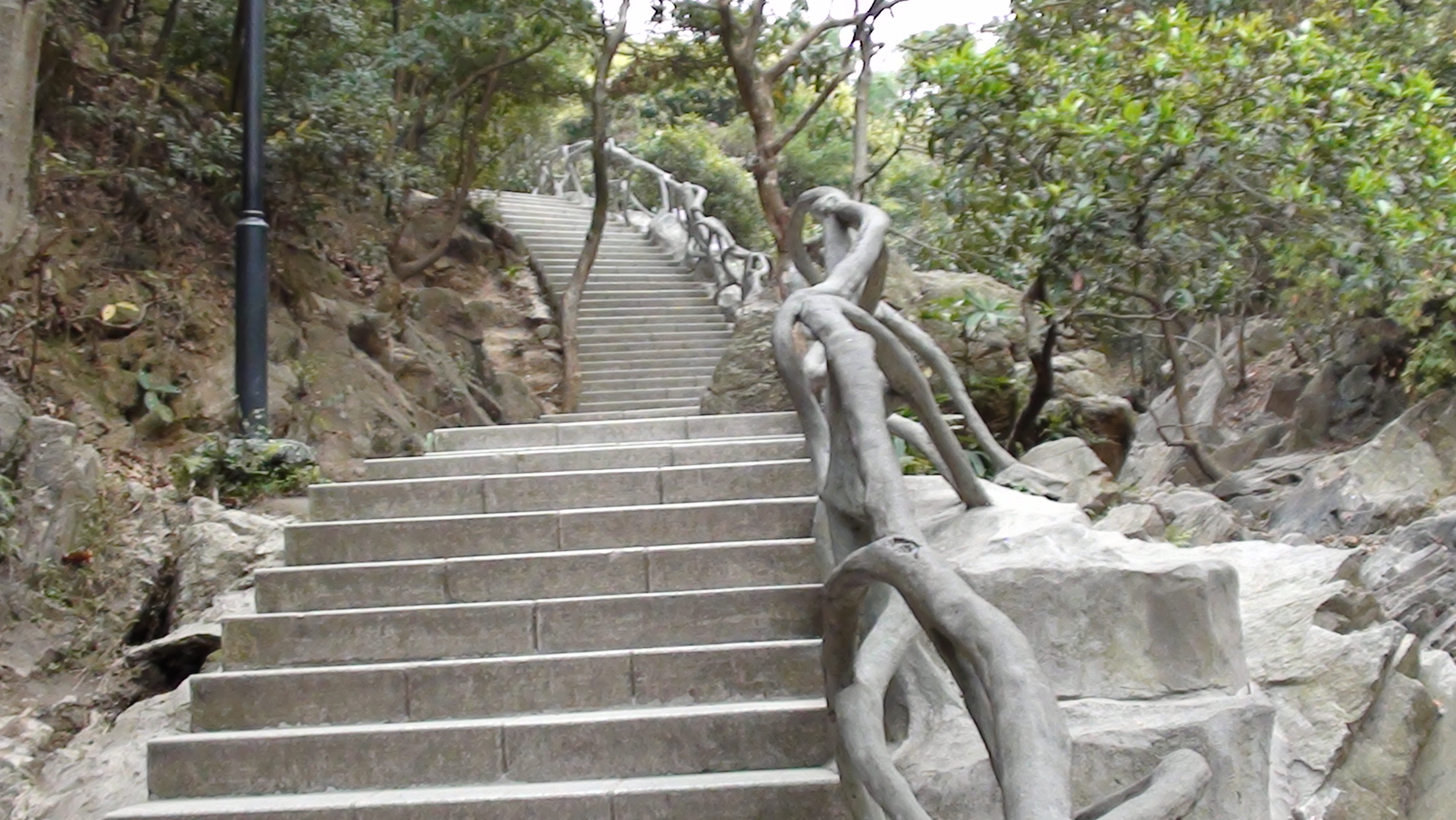
Walking path up the mountain

Fenghuang Mountain is a mountain range that runs roughly north to south, located in the northwest of Shenzhen Special Economic Zone. It covers an area of 29.7 square kilometers and is about 40 kilometers from Shenzhen's city center (Futian District). At the south end is the only tunnel on the Guangshen Expressway: Hubei Hill Tunnel (虎背山隧道). At the north end is a plain on the east bank of the mouth of the Pearl River. The surrounding area includes the towns of Fuyong, Songgang, Shajing, and Gongming, as well as Dongguan's Chang'an Town. At the southwest foot of the range there were once fish ponds and farmland that went up to the banks of the Pearl River, but in the late 1980s, the city of Shenzhen began to fill in the fish ponds and fields and replaced them with Bao'an International Airport. South of the southern end of the range is the central urban part of Bao'an District.

=== Noteworthy stones ===
Although Fenghuang Mountain is not a very tall mountain, it has lush vegetation and is celebrated for its remarkable stones. One natural boulder is known as the "nodding oriole" (莺石点头) as it resembles an oriole's mouth. The stone's name was recorded by the 1676 jinshi Wen Chaoling (文超灵), and the stone is inscribed with verses written by a number of famous people. In addition, to the right of Fengyan Temple are two boulders folded together like clasped hands, known as the "clasped hands stones" (合掌石). In the crack between the two boulders is an inscription: "Phoenix feathers transform into a dragon" (凤毛神化度云龙). According to legend, on the cliff there is also a trace of the last Song emperor Zhao Bing's dragon robe, and it was therefore named the "cliff of the hanging dragon robe" (龙袍挂壁).

== Buddhist culture and visitors ==
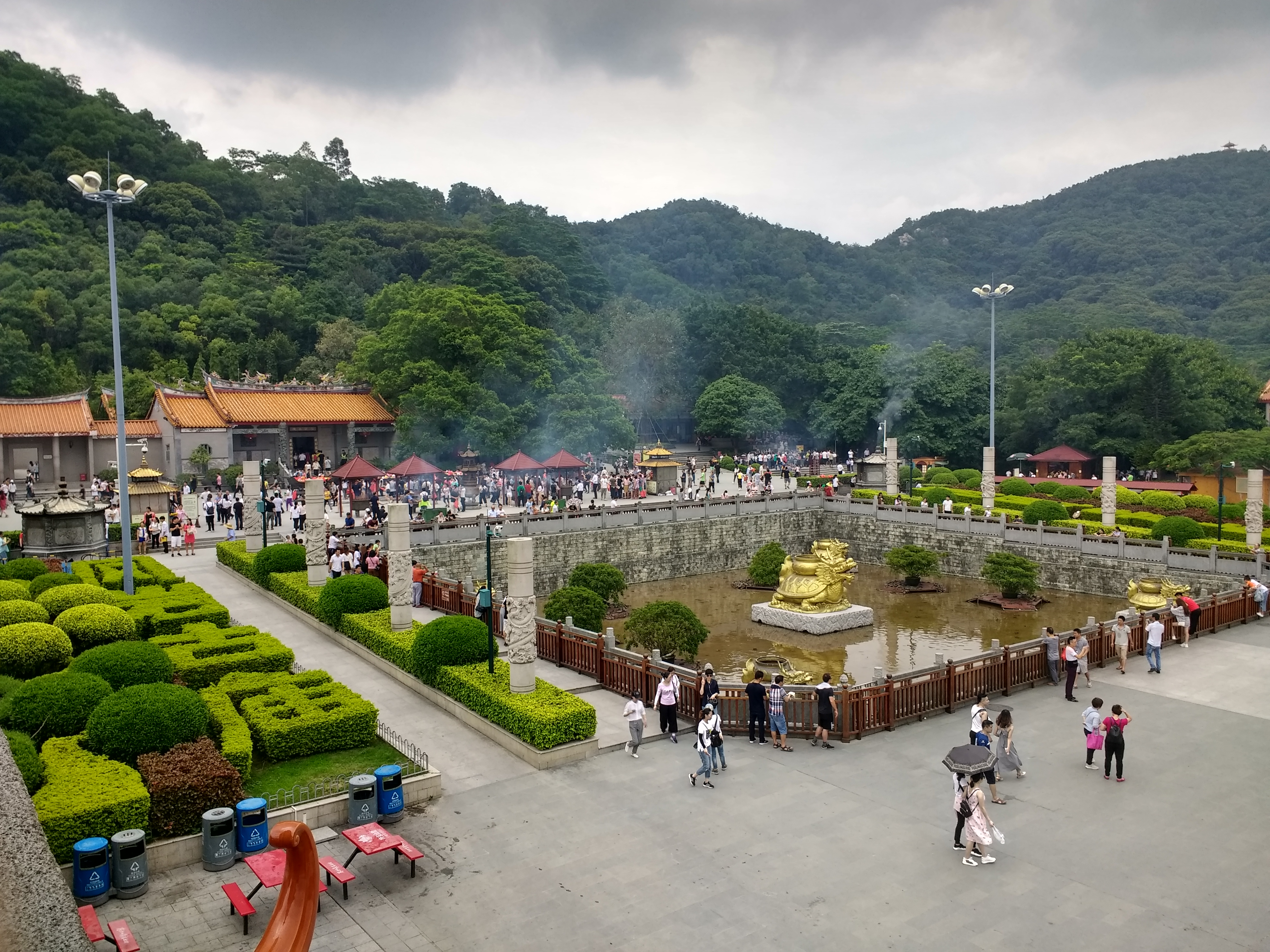
Fengyan Temple

Like Wutong Mountain, Fenghuang Mountain is a major site of Buddhist culture in Shenzhen. Fengyan Temple is influential in Bao'an District and the surrounding area, with incense left burning throughout the year. Construction of the temple began in 1297 during the Southern Song dynasty; it was built by descendants of Wen Tianxiang. Today it attracts many worshippers from other parts of the Pearl River Delta, who come to burn incense and pray to Buddha to bring good fortune to themselves and their families.

In terms of visitor amenities, Fenghuang Mountain has a road that leads up to the temple, as well as many walking paths which go up to the summit. To provide parking for the huge numbers of cars driven by worshippers, the foot of the mountain has an extra-large parking lot with a capacity of 800 cars. On holidays such as Chinese New Year, Qingming Festival, Labor Day, National Day, and the Double Ninth Festival, the temple bustles with the activity of visitors who come to pray. According to Shenzhen News, in February 2011, Fenghuang Mountain received as many as 300,000 visitors on Chinese New Year's Eve and New Year's Day, making it the most popular visitor attraction in Shenzhen for that period.

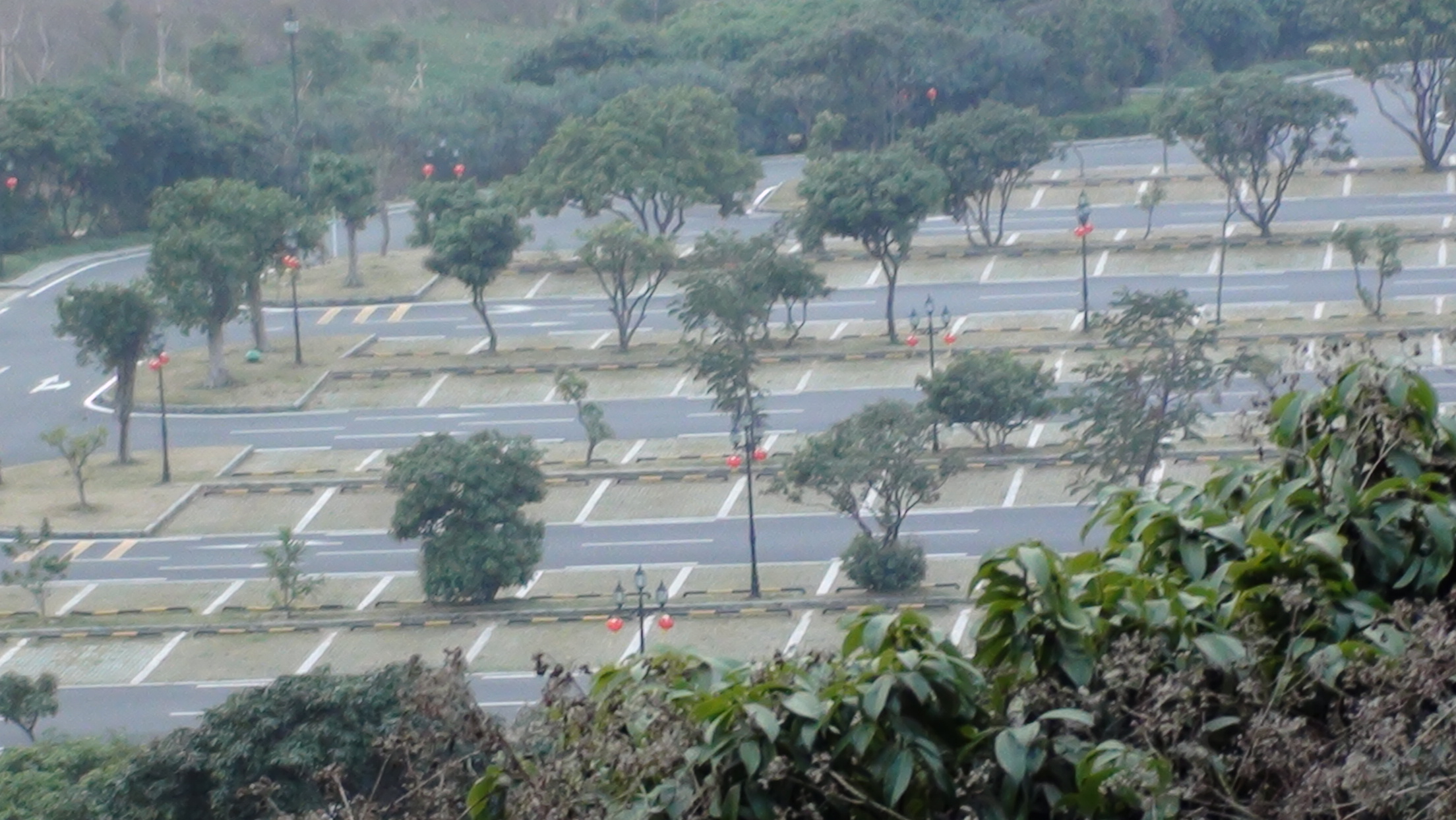
Green parking lot

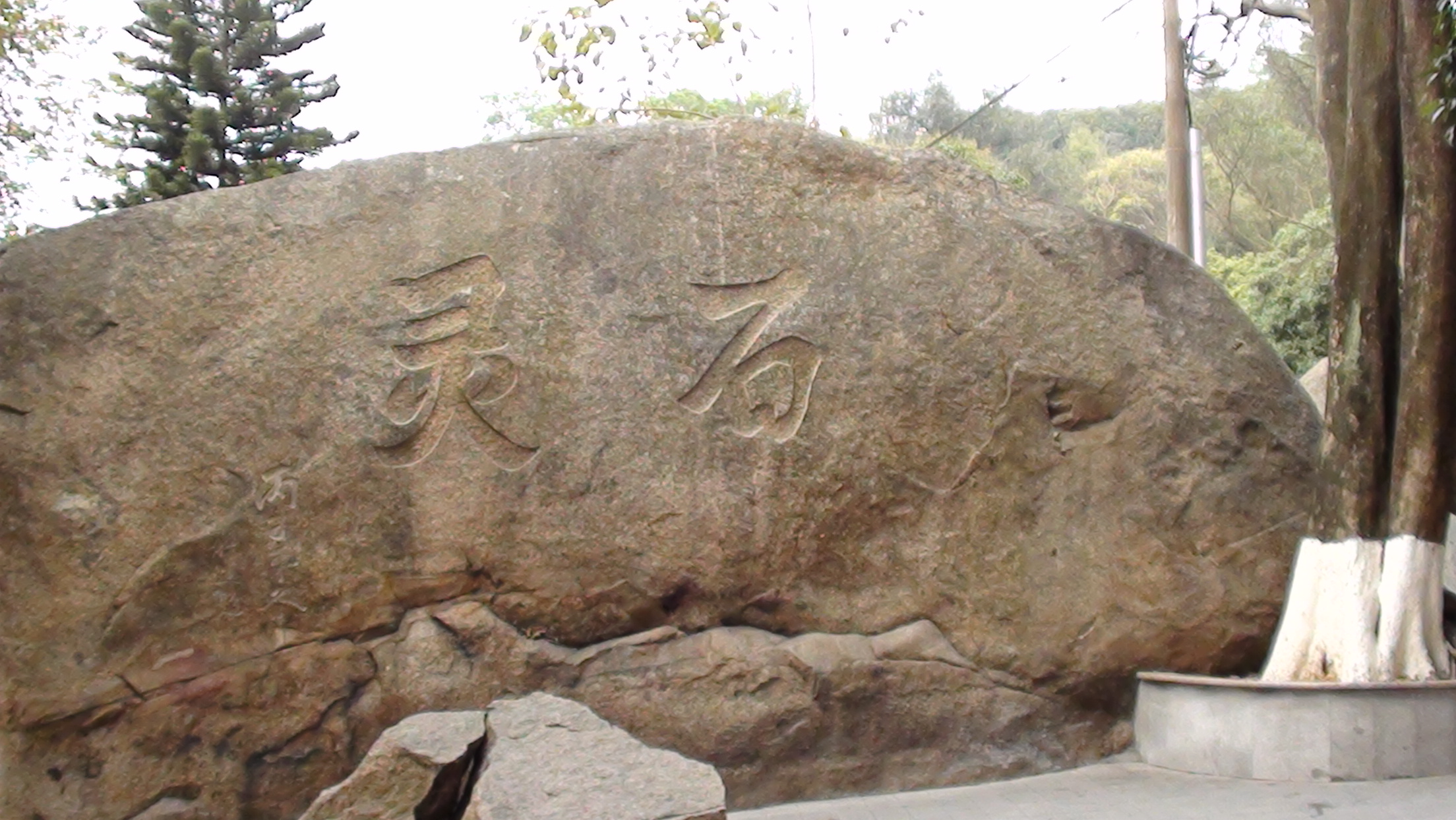
A boulder with an inscription

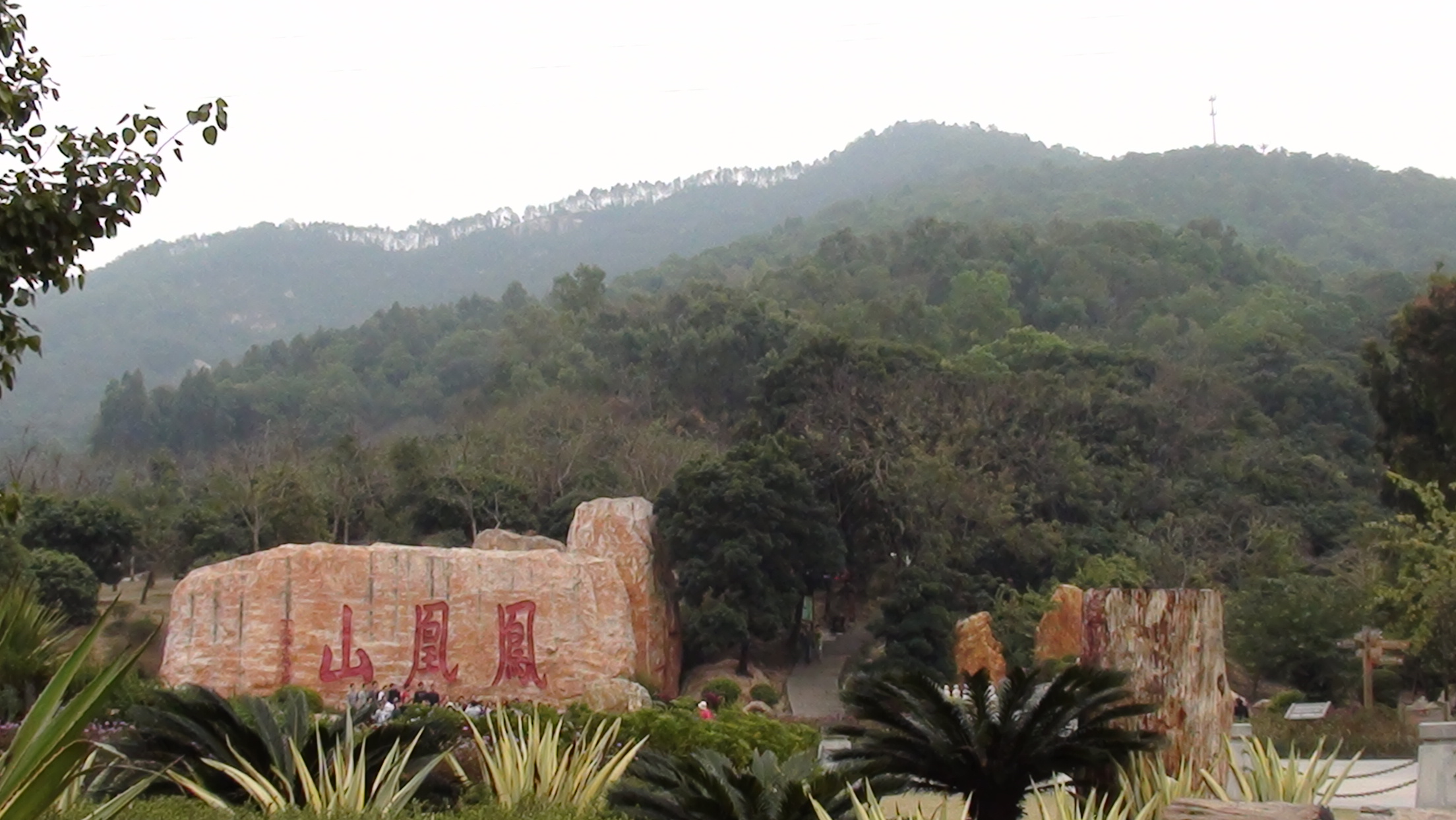
View from the foot of the mountain

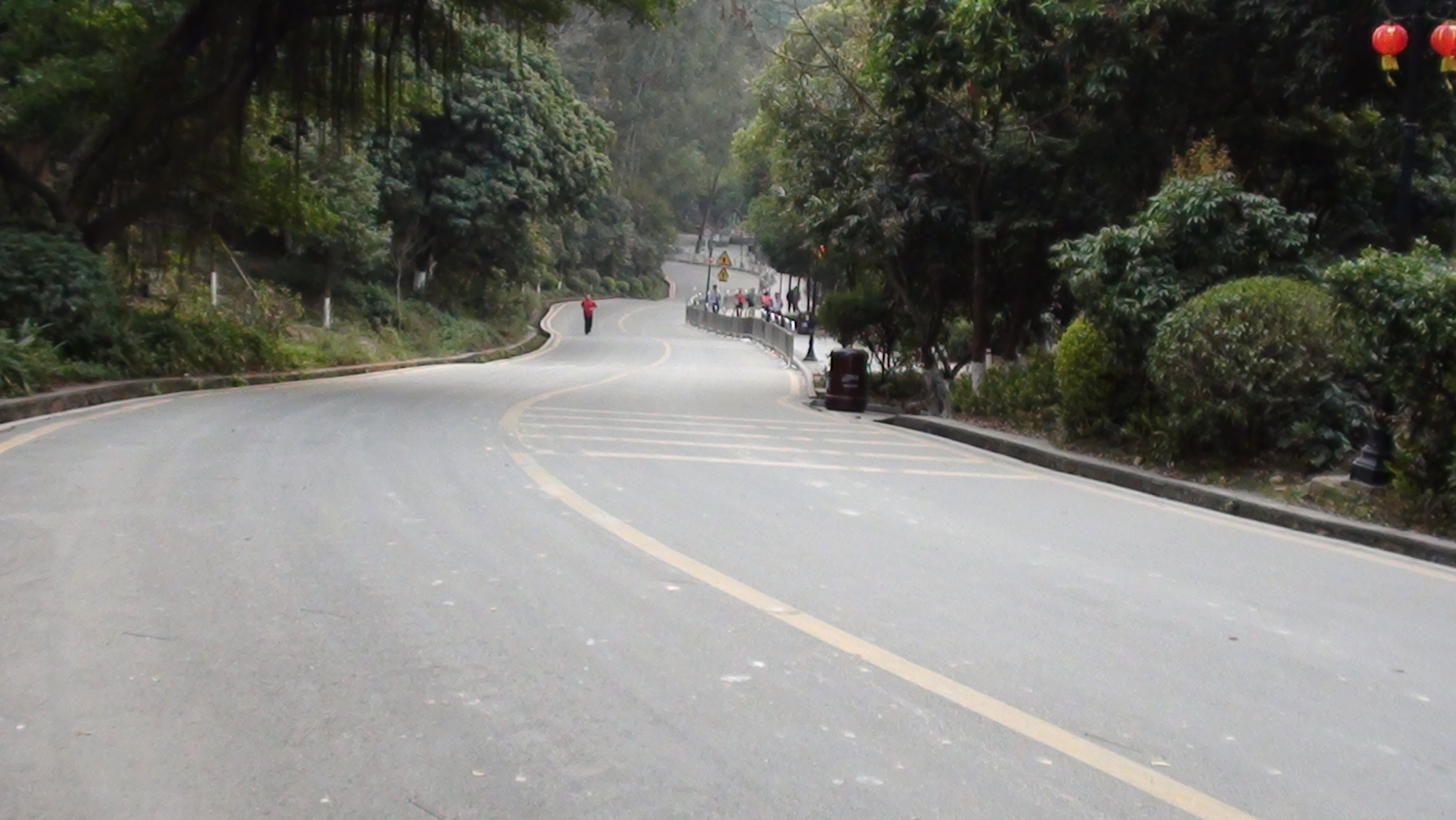
Road leading up the mountain

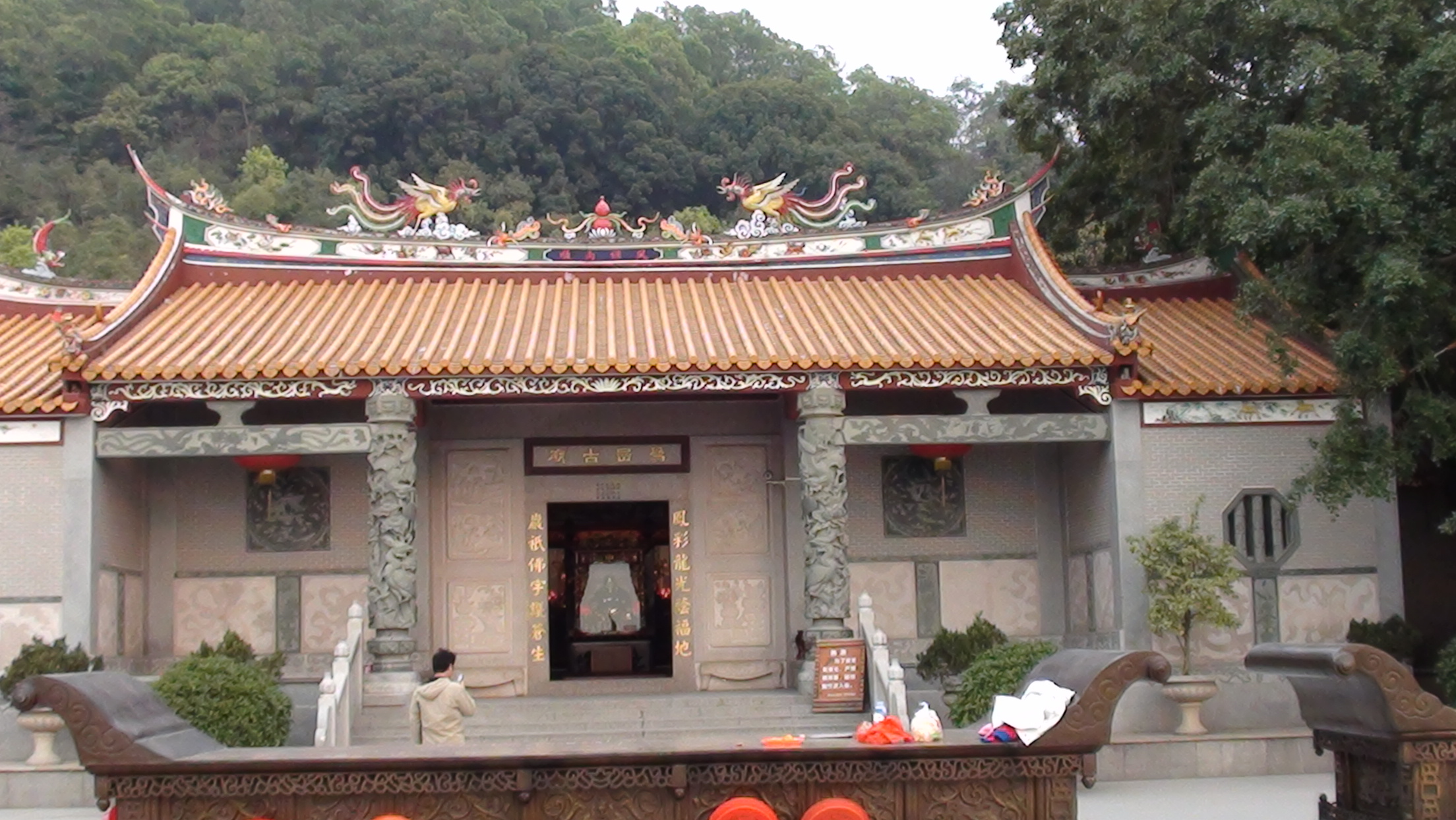
Fengyan Temple
