= Fenghuang Airport =

Fenghuang Airport may refer to:

- Sanya Phoenix International Airport, or Sanya Fenghuang Airport, in Sanya, Hainan, China
- Tongren Fenghuang Airport in Tongren, Guizhou, China
