= Phoenix Mountain (Liaoning) =

Mountain in Liaoning, China

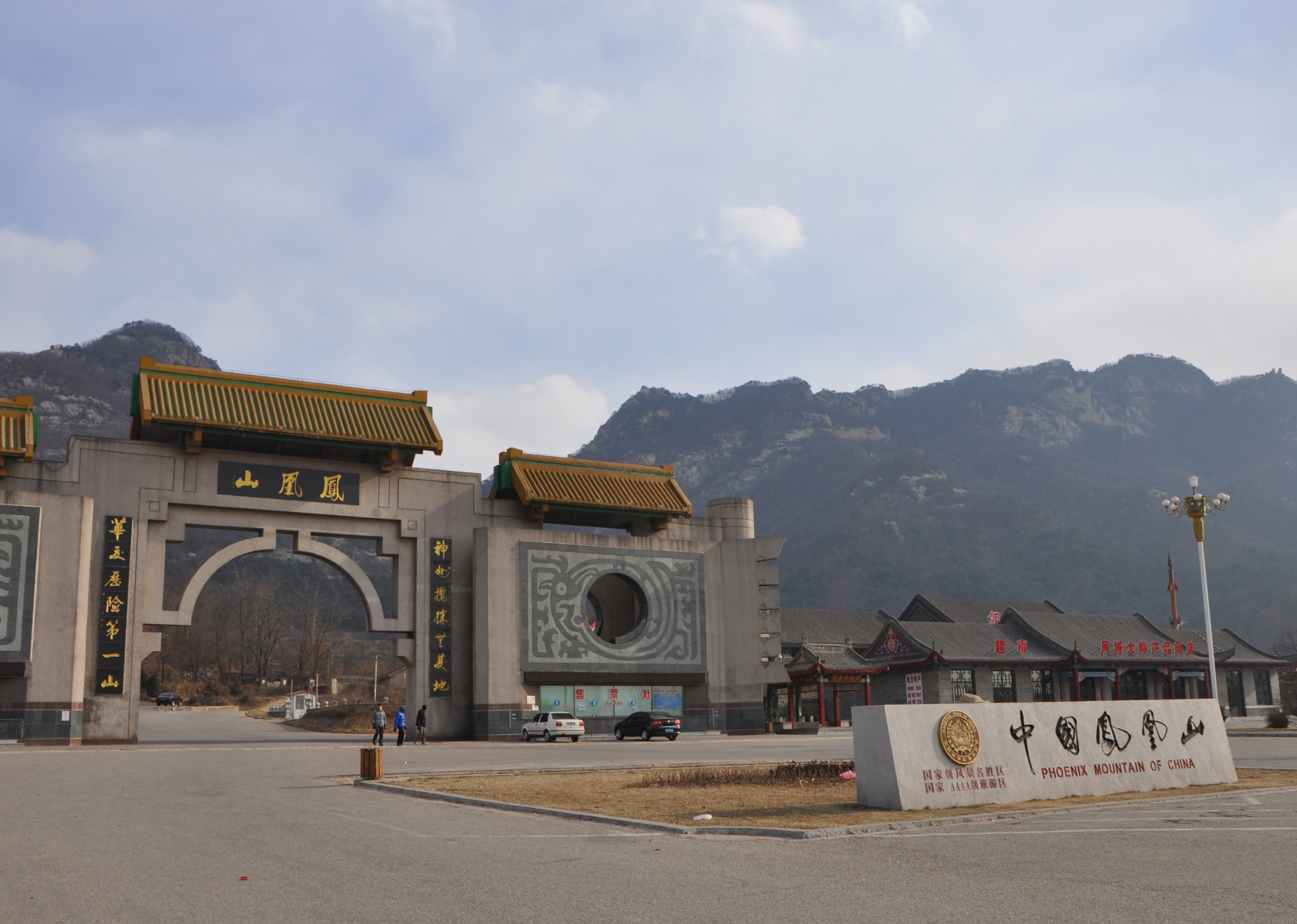
- Entrance to the Phoenix Mountain Scenic Area
- Traditional Chinese: 鳳凰山
- Simplified Chinese: 凤凰山
Transcriptions
Standard Mandarin
- Hanyu Pinyin: Fènghuángshān
- Wade–Giles: Feng-huang Shan

Phoenix Mountain, also known by its Chinese name Fenghuangshan, is a mountain located in Fengcheng, Dandong Prefecture, Liaoning Province, China. Its highest peak is called Jianyan (Chinese: 箭眼) with a height of 836 meters above sea level. Phoenix Mountain is one of Liaoning Provinces's four famous mountains, the other three being Qianshan, Yiwulü Mountain, and Yao Mountain.

== See also ==
- Other Phoenix Mountains
