= Fengcheng, Liaoning =

Fengcheng 凤城市
- County-level city
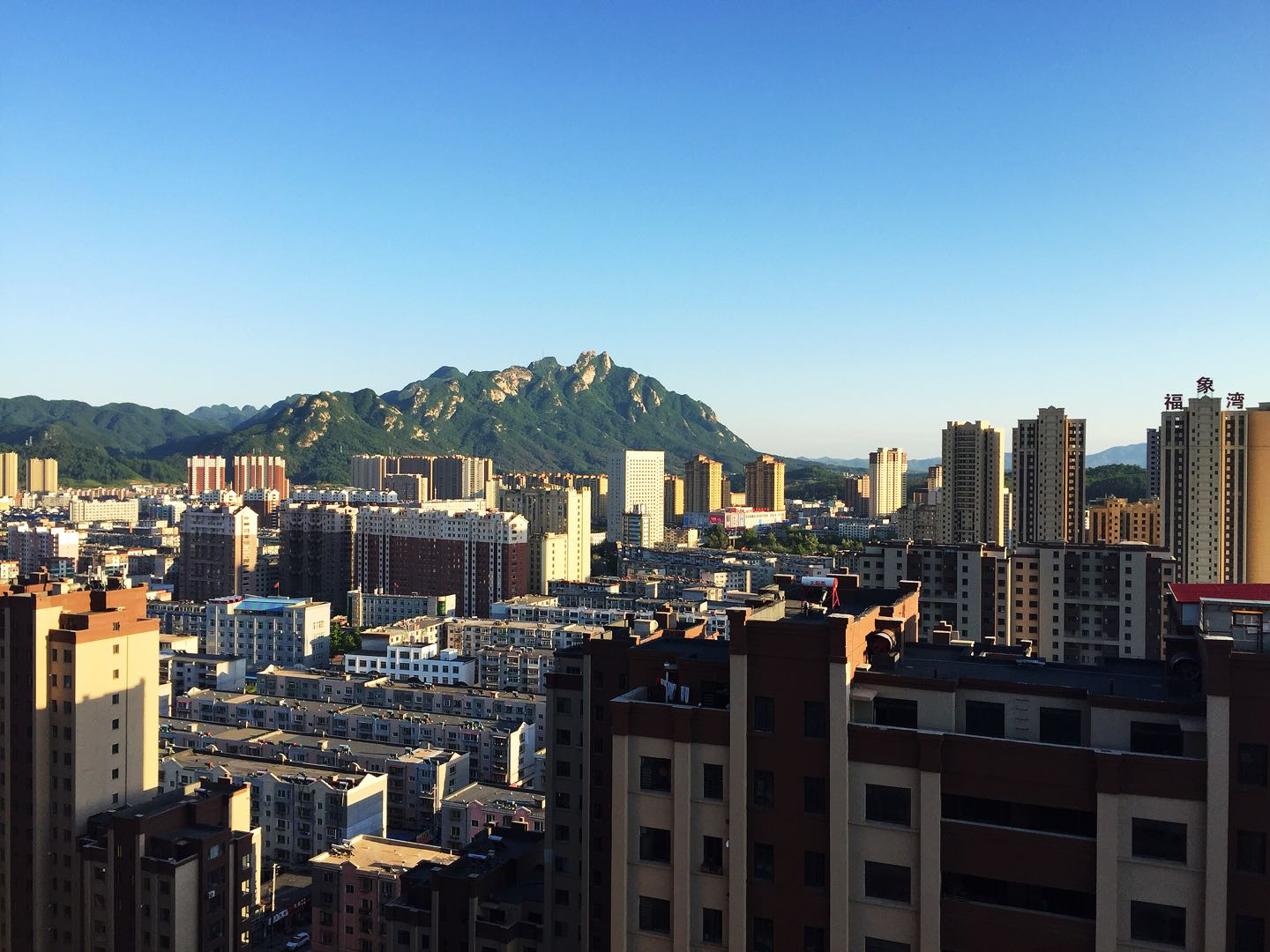

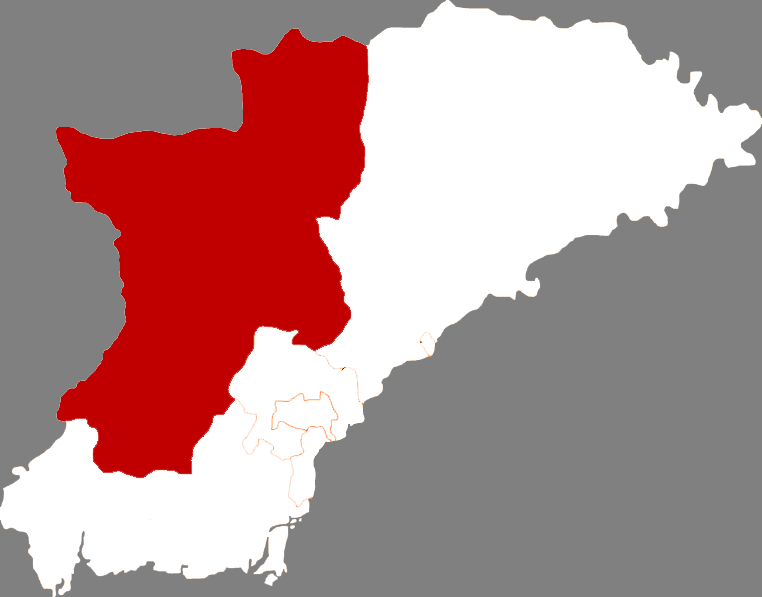
- Location in Dandong

- Location in Liaoning
- Coordinates: 40°27′N 124°04′E
- Country: People's Republic of China
- Province: Liaoning
- Prefecture-level city: Dandong

Area
  - County-level city: 5,515.0 km^{2} (2,129.4 sq mi)
  - Urban: 329.33 km^{2} (127.16 sq mi)

Population (2017)
  - County-level city: 580,000
  - Density: 110/km^{2} (270/sq mi)
  - Urban: 195,700
- Time zone: UTC+8 (China Standard)

Fengcheng (simplified Chinese: 凤城; traditional Chinese: 鳳城; pinyin: Fèngchéng; lit. 'Phoenix City') is a city in the southeast of Liaoning Province in Northeast China. Administratively, it is a county-level city under the administration of Dandong, the downtown of which lies 45 kilometres (28 mi) southeast of the city.

Formally known as the Fengcheng Manchu Autonomous County, its city status (a county-level city) was approved in 1994.

== Administrative divisions ==
There are three subdistricts, 18 town, and one ethnic township under the city's administration.

Subdistricts:

- Fenghuangcheng Subdistrict (凤凰城街道), Fengshan Subdistrict (凤山街道), Caohe Subdistrict (草河街道)

Towns:

- Qingchengzi (青城子镇), Tongyuanbao (通远堡镇), Aiyang (爱阳镇), Saima (赛马镇), Jiguanshan (鸡冠山镇), Bianmen (边门镇), Hongqi (红旗镇), Dixiongshan (弟兄山镇), Dabao (大堡镇), Dongtang (东汤镇), Liujiahe (刘家河镇), Baoshan (宝山镇), Lanqi (蓝旗镇), Baiqi (白旗镇), Simenzi (四门子镇), Shicheng (石城镇), Shalizhai (沙里寨镇), Daxing (大兴镇)

The only township is Dabao Mongol Ethnic Township (大堡蒙古族乡)

== Climate ==
Climate data for Fengcheng, elevation 73 m (240 ft), (1991–2020 normals, extremes 1981–present)
Month	Jan	Feb	Mar	Apr	May	Jun	Jul	Aug	Sep	Oct	Nov	Dec	Year
Record high °C (°F)	9.4 (48.9)	16.0 (60.8)	23.9 (75.0)	28.3 (82.9)	34.0 (93.2)	36.7 (98.1)	37.3 (99.1)	39.3 (102.7)	34.8 (94.6)	28.4 (83.1)	19.3 (66.7)	11.0 (51.8)	39.3 (102.7)
Mean daily maximum °C (°F)	−2.4 (27.7)	1.7 (35.1)	8.2 (46.8)	16.6 (61.9)	22.7 (72.9)	26.2 (79.2)	28.3 (82.9)	28.9 (84.0)	25.0 (77.0)	17.4 (63.3)	7.2 (45.0)	−1.2 (29.8)	14.9 (58.8)
Daily mean °C (°F)	−9.1 (15.6)	−4.8 (23.4)	1.9 (35.4)	9.7 (49.5)	15.9 (60.6)	20.5 (68.9)	23.7 (74.7)	23.5 (74.3)	18.0 (64.4)	10.2 (50.4)	1.3 (34.3)	−7.1 (19.2)	8.6 (47.6)
Mean daily minimum °C (°F)	−14.4 (6.1)	−10.3 (13.5)	−3.4 (25.9)	3.3 (37.9)	9.7 (49.5)	15.7 (60.3)	20.2 (68.4)	19.6 (67.3)	12.7 (54.9)	4.3 (39.7)	−3.5 (25.7)	−11.9 (10.6)	3.5 (38.3)
Record low °C (°F)	−31.4 (−24.5)	−26.1 (−15.0)	−18.6 (−1.5)	−7.7 (18.1)	0.8 (33.4)	6.9 (44.4)	11.5 (52.7)	8.5 (47.3)	−0.1 (31.8)	−9.0 (15.8)	−20.5 (−4.9)	−27.5 (−17.5)	−31.4 (−24.5)
Average precipitation mm (inches)	5.9 (0.23)	13.4 (0.53)	19.4 (0.76)	48.2 (1.90)	74.7 (2.94)	110.5 (4.35)	218.4 (8.60)	275.7 (10.85)	72.0 (2.83)	53.3 (2.10)	32.3 (1.27)	12.6 (0.50)	936.4 (36.86)
Average precipitation days (≥ 0.1 mm)	3.3	4.0	5.2	7.7	9.8	12.2	14.9	12.9	8.1	7.2	6.4	4.7	96.4
Average snowy days	5.2	5.1	4.3	1.1	0	0	0	0	0	0.3	3.8	6.8	26.6
Average relative humidity (%)	58	57	58	58	67	78	85	84	77	70	65	63	68
Mean monthly sunshine hours	195.3	193.4	230.7	230.8	253.1	202.0	163.8	206.6	227.5	210.4	168.9	169.8	2,452.3
Percentage possible sunshine	65	64	62	58	57	45	36	49	62	62	57	59	56
Source: China Meteorological Administrationall-time extreme temperature

== Landmarks ==
- Fenghuang Mountain
