= Agriculture in Chinese mythology =

Chinese mythology of agriculture

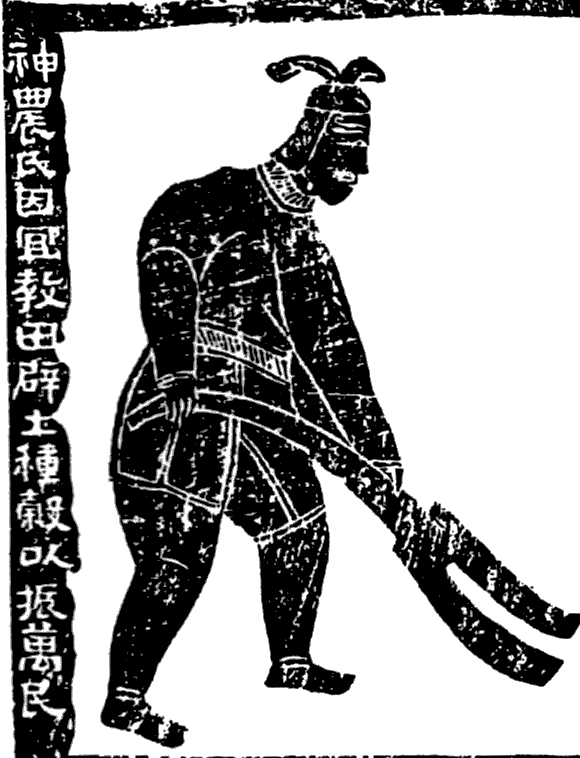
Shennong ploughing fields, Han dynasty mural

Agriculture is an important theme in Chinese mythology. There are many myths about the invention of agriculture that have been told or written about in China. Chinese mythology refers to those myths found in the historical geographic area of China. (Note: The geographic area of "China" is of course a concept which has evolved or changed through history.) This includes myths in Chinese and other languages, as transmitted by Han Chinese as well as other ethnic groups (of which fifty-six are officially recognized by the current administration of China). Many of the myths about agriculture involve its invention by such deities or cultural heroes such as Shennong, Houji, Houtu, and Shujun: of these Shennong is the most famous, according to Lihui Yang. There are also many other myths. Myths related to agriculture include how humans learned the use of fire, cooking, animal husbandry and the use of draft animals, inventions of various agricultural tools and implements, the domestication of various species of plants such as ginger and radishes, the evaluation and uses of various types of soil, irrigation by digging wells, and the invention of farmers markets. Other myths include events which made agriculture possible by destroying an excessive number of suns in the sky or ending the Great Flood.

== Myth versus history ==
In the study of historical Chinese culture, many of the stories that have been told regarding characters and events which have been written or told of the distant past have a double tradition: one which presents a more historicized and one which presents a more mythological version. This is also true in many of the accounts related to the acquisition of agricultural civilization in China.

== Shennong ==
Shennong is generally credited with having invented basic agriculture, including the plow; although he seems to have originated as a god of the burning wind, which is perhaps a reference to slash-and-burn agriculture, according to Anthony Christie.

== Houji ==
Houji was also known as Ji Qi, especially in more historically-oriented contexts. Posthumously, he was better known as Houji, from hou, meaning "prince/deity/spirit", and ji, meaning "agriculture", according to K. C. Wu.

== Houtu ==
A deity of the Earth who figures in various myths.

== Shujun ==
Shujun is a Chinese god of farming and cultivation, also known as Yijun and Shangjun. Alternatively he is a legendary culture hero of ancient times, who was in the family tree of ancient Chinese emperors descended from the Yellow Emperor (Huangdi). Shujun is specially credited with inventing the use of a draft animal of the bovine family to pull a plow to turn the soil prior to planting.

== Great Flood ==
Myths about a huge flood which lasted for many years before finally being controlled often include a motif of the acquisition of the agricultural civilization.

== Wugu ==
Traditionally there were five granular and storable staple food crops in China. Known as the "Five Grains", specific lists vary, but generally they include various seeds from the cereal, bean, and sometimes other families.

== Seeds from dog ==
According to some mythological accounts, the ancestral seed grains of modern crops were found stuck to the hair of a dog. There are many variants of this myth.

== Related ==
There are various myths related to agriculture. Humans are said to have been taught the use of fire by Suiren. Suiren, also known as the Drill Man, used a fire-drill to start fires, and thus to allowing food to be cooked . Also: animal husbandry and the use of draft animals, inventions of various agricultural tools and implements, the domestication of various species of plants such as rice and ginger and radishes, the evaluation and uses of various types of soil, and irrigation by digging wells. Other myths include events which made agriculture possible by destroying an excessive number of suns in the sky or ending the Great Flood. Also there were all sorts of deities or beings in charge of bringing rain, drought, and various cyclical phenomena such as day and night or the various seasons in their proper order, which are vital aspects of successful agriculture. Other myths include the invention of farmers markets and the invention of fermentation.

== Religion ==
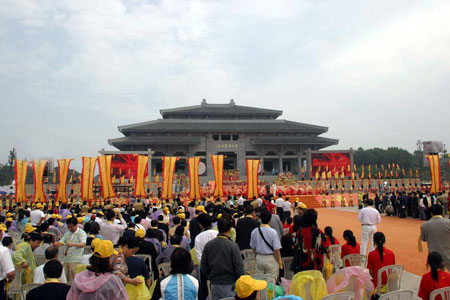
A modern Great Temple of Yandi and Shennong (May 20, 2009).

Many of the myths regarding agriculture in China are related to popular religion and ritual.

== See also ==
- Agriculture in China
- Bigu (avoiding grains)
- Chinese dragon
- Chinese folklore
- Chinese folk religion
- Chinese literature
- Dog in Chinese mythology
- Di Ku
- Five Grains
- Great Flood (China)
- Houji
- Houtu
- Ox in Chinese mythology
- Shennong
- Shujun
- Soil and grain
- Traditional Chinese Medicine
- Yellow Emperor
- Zhurong
