= Zhong Hui (Shang dynasty) =

Shang dynasty minister

- 仲虺
- Born: c. 17th – 16th century BCE
- Other names: Family name: Zhong (仲); Given name: Hui (虺)
- Occupation: Politician
- Known for: Serving Tang of Shang
- Notable work: The Announcement of Zhong Hui
- Military career
- Allegiance: Predynastic Shang
- Conflicts: Battle of Mingtiao

Minister of the Left for the Shang dynasty
- Monarch: Tang
- Constituency: Pi (邳, also known as Xue (薛), modern-day Tengzhou and Xuecheng)

Chinese name
- Chinese: 仲虺
Transcriptions
Standard Mandarin
- Hanyu Pinyin: Zhòng Huǐ
Middle Chinese
- Middle Chinese: drjuwngH xjw+jX
Old Chinese
- Baxter–Sagart (2014): /*N-truŋ-s [r̥]u[j]ʔ/

Zhong Hui (仲虺) was the Minister of the Left for Tang of Shang during Predynastic Shang, the Battle of Mingtiao and the resultant Shang dynasty. He is seemingly unmentioned in oracle bones.

== Name ==
Zhong Hui is occasionally named differently across classical texts. Ming dynasty scholar Chen Shiyuan (陳士元) finds several examples where different names are used in the same place as Zhong Hui when discussing who Tang of Shang's Minister of the Left was alongside Yi Yin. Coupled with their similar pronunciations, he therefore concludes that these are variants of the same person. Records of the Grand Historian is found to name him Zhong Lei (中壘) and Zhong Gui (仲傀), and Xunzi names him Zhong Kui (中蘬). He also reports Mencius as an outlier, naming him Lai Zhu (萊朱), which Zhu Zhaoqi (朱趙岐) believed to be another name for him and noted such in a commentary.

Given the age of the received Chinese characters in these names, save for zhong 中, it is likely that none of these names reflect the one used by the historical Zhong Hui. Very few personal names of Shang dynasty individuals are known; most names in general are temple names that were given posthumously for the purpose of ancestor veneration.

== Lineage ==
Zhong Hui was a descendant of Xi Zhong (奚仲) of Xia, the Marquis of Pi and a legendary creator of chariots. The Classic of Mountains and Seas traces the ancestry of Xi Zhong to Di Jun, an obscure figure who may be synonymous with Emperor Ku. Another relative, Ji Guang (吉光), produced wooden chariots, which paved the way for Xiang Tu to produce horse-drawn carriages.

Zhong Hui's descendent, Zhong Ji (仲幾), shows that Zhong Hui's lineage continued ruling Pi into the era of the Zhou dynasty, where they followed Song out of tradition.

== Biography ==
Little is known about Zhong Hui's early life. At some point, he was employed by Tang as his Minister of the Left, whilst Yi Yin would serve as the Minister of the Right. Shuowen Jiezi notes that Zhong Hui was enfeoffed in Pi (邳, modern-day Xuecheng District) at some point, where he would reside during the Battle of Mingtiao. Zhong Hui exerted considerable influence during their tenure, and would give their thoughts on warfare. This came to a head when Tang reached Dadong (大峒), Zhong Hui famously gave a proclamation named "The Announcement of Zhong Hui" (仲虺之告) that was recorded in the Book of Documents, which is preserved in other Chinese classics quoting it, chiefly on the matters of war, such as Zuo Zhuan and Mozi. However, the original text is considered lost.

The Tsinghua Bamboo Slips cache preserves myriad illegally excavated bamboo slips and maintains them for study. Among these is Tang dwells in Tangqiu (湯處于湯丘), where Zhong Hui expresses concern for Tang repeatedly going out at night unaccompanied to see a sick Yi Yin. Tang accepts the criticism, but explains that Yi Yin's merit warrants such action, and to not go would be to neglect his own royal duties.

== The Announcement of Zhong Hui ==
The Announcement of Zhong Hui was a chapter in the Book of Documents. At some point, the text was lost, which traditional historiography states occurred during the Burning of books and burying of scholars by Qin Shi Huang. This narrative is doubted by modern scholarship, but the received work is a forgery, and the original text as quoted by Zhou-Qin dynasty scholars has not been recovered.

From extant quotations, the text appears to be one of the earliest conceptions of the Mandate of Heaven and Legalist thought. If the text were written by a figure of Predynastic Shang, it would therefore connect these concepts with Shang culture. However, this is unclear. As the Mandate of Heaven is not reflected in oracle bone evidence, what is written here could be an imposition on the Shang made by Western Zhou-era thinkers.

=== Forged text ===
Among the first individuals to notice the received Announcement of Zhong Hui was forged was Wu Yu (吳棫) in Shu Bi Zhuan (書裨傳) during the Song dynasty, but the text appears to be lost. Zhu Xi would raise suspicions around the same time in A Collection of Conversations of Master Zhu. These suspicions would be proven correct by Mei Zhuo during the Ming dynasty in Shangshu Kaoyi (尚書考異), where specific language is taken and shown to be stitched together from myriad sources. This determination has since stuck, and the original Announcement of Zhong Hui has yet to be found. As classical texts quote it, which predate forgers such as Mei Ze, it is believed that the text did exist.

=== Quotations ===
The Announcement of Zhong Hui is quoted by several individuals, specifically in the texts Mozi, Zuo Zhuan, and Lüshi Chunqiu.

Mozi quotes what appears to be the same line in all three chapters of "Against Fate" (非命), albeit with slightly different wording each time. Within the quote, Zhong Hui discusses Jie of Xia's crimes, asserting that his claim to the Mandate of Heaven is a false one.

墨子·非命上：
仲虺之告曰：『我聞于夏，人矯天命布命于下，帝伐之惡，龔喪厥師。』
I heard of (the ruler of) Xia, who falsely claimed the Mandate of Heaven and issued commands below. The Emperor detested his evil and destroyed his host.

墨子·非命中：
仲虺之告曰：『我聞有夏，人矯天命布命于下，帝式是惡，用闕師。』
I heard of the (the ruler of) Xia, who falsely claimed the Mandate of Heaven and issued commands below. The Emperor accordingly detested this and overthrew his host.

墨子·非命下：
仲虺之告曰：『我聞有夏，人矯天命于下，帝式是增，用爽厥師。』
I heard of the (the ruler of) Xia, who falsely claimed the Mandate of Heaven below. The Emperor accordingly punished this and scattered his host.

Ian Johnston gives the following reading for the quote, taking it as a single one: (Note: fa 伐 is read as shi 式, and jue 蕨 is read as qi 其.)

I have heard that the man of Xia feigned the decree of Heaven and put forth a decree to his subjects. The Supreme Lord thereupon resented him and destroyed his forces.

In Zuo Zhuan, Duke Xiang of Lu and Duke Ding of Lu are seen quoting Zhong Hui on various occasions, particularly concerned with the meaning of 「亂者取之，亡者侮之」 "Those who cause chaos take it, those who perish despise it." The following quote from Duke Xiang of Lu is the longest, and every other quotation is a segment from the same line with no deviation, coming from his 14th year.

春秋左傳·襄公十四年：
仲虺有言曰：『亡者侮之，亂者取之。推亡、固存，國之道也。』
Mock the dead; seize the chaos. Push down the dead, secure the living. This is the way of a state.

In Lüshi Chunqiu, King Zhuang of Chu quotes the Announcement of Zhong Hui during a more elaborate conversation with Li Kui (李悝).

呂氏春秋·恃君覽·驕恣：
王曰：『仲虺有言，不穀說之。曰：「諸侯之德，能自為取師者王，能自取友者存，其所擇而莫如己者亡。」今以不穀之不肖也，群臣之謀又莫吾及也，我其亡乎？』
Among feudal lords, those who can choose their own teachers become kings; those who can select friends for themselves survive; and those whose choices are no better than themselves perish.
