= Di Jun =

One of the ancient supreme deities of China

Di Jun (Chinese: 帝俊; pinyin: Dìjùn), also known as Emperor Jun, is one of the ancient supreme deities of China, now known primarily through five chapters of the Shanhaijing (Yang 2005, 97). Di Jun had two wives, or consorts: Xihe and Changxi, and Di Jun figures in several stories from Chinese mythology. One of the famous myths in which Di Jun appears is that of the archer Houyi, to whom he gave a bow and arrows (Birrell 1993, 314). Di Jun is also associated with the agricultural arts, either directly or as the progenitor of other innovators of farming practice, including especially his son, Houji, the Zhou ancestor (Yang 2005, 98). Some scholars identify Di Jun and Di Ku as variations from a shared original source (Yang 2005, 100).

== See also ==
- Chinese mythology
- Di Ku
- Five Grains
- Horse in Chinese mythology
- Houyi
- Shujun
- Zhong Hui, a supposed descendant of Di Jun.
