= Pi (state) =

Pi 邳
- c. 21st Century BCE–unknown
- Capital: Xuecheng (薛城), 30 km south of Tengzhou, Shandong Province; Lower Pi (下邳), North east of Pizhou City, Shandong Province; Upper Pi (上邳), West of the Xuecheng District, Zaozhuang City, Shandong Province
- Religion: Chinese folk religion, ancestor worship, Taoism
- Government: Monarchy
- Earl
  - c. 21st Century BCE: Xi Zhong
  - c. 17th Century BCE: Zhong Hui
- History
  - Established: c. 21st Century BCE
  - Disestablished: unknown
- Currency: Chinese coin, gold coins
| Succeeded by |
| Chu (state) |

Pi (Chinese: 邳; pinyin: Pī) was a pre-Qin dynasty (pre-256 BCE) vassal state in ancient China. Also known as Xue (Chinese: 薛), Pi was ruled by members of the Ren (任) family.

During the Western Zhou dynasty (1046–771 BCE), the State of Pi shared a border with the State of Song to the east and the State of Tan (郯国) to the north.

== Etymology ==
Pi (邳) is a phono-semantic compound of pī (丕) and the semantic component for states (邑).

Among the earliest extant mentions of the state refers to a lei produced by an Earl of Pi for their sons, from the Spring and Autumn period, unearthed in 1954. It bears the following inscription:

隹正月初吉，丁亥，邳伯夏子自作尊罍，用祈眉寿无疆，子子孙孙永宝用之
It is on the auspicious first lunar month, on the dinghai day, that the Earl of Pi, Xiazi, makes themselves this zun lei vessel, used to pray for a long life, and for their sons and grandsons to treasure forever.

== History ==
The progenitor of Pi is said to be Xi Zhong, a mythical creator of chariots who served as a minister for such to Yu the Great during the semi-legendary Xia dynasty (c. 2070 BC – 1600 BCE). He was given land at the confluence of the Dan (丹水) and Yi Rivers (沂水) in the southern part of modern-day Shandong. The Bamboo Annals first mention the state in relation to Zhong Kang's son, Xiang, who resided there in the seventh year of his reign. At some point prior to the fall of the Xia dynasty, Zhong Hui, the Minister of the Left for Tang, was enfeoffed here, though this is only mentioned in later accounts of his life.

When moving to discuss the Shang dynasty, the Bamboo Annals state that during the reign of Wai Ren of the Shang dynasty, he resided in the capital Ao (隞), (Note: This is written as xiao 囂 in the text, but it is a variant.) and the people of Pi and Xian (姺) rebelled against him. Come the reign of He Dan Jia, Pi was subdued by the State of Peng.

In 418 BCE, the State of Qi moved into Xue's territory forcing its inhabitants to move south into Lower Pi (邳下), which was located on the lower reaches of the Si River. Upper Pi (邳上) lay to the north along the same river. The state was eventually annexed by the State of Chu.

== Notable people ==
- Xi Zhong - Mythical creator of chariots.
- Zhong Hui - Minister of the Left for Tang of Shang.
