= Xihe (deity) =

Solar deity in Chinese mythology

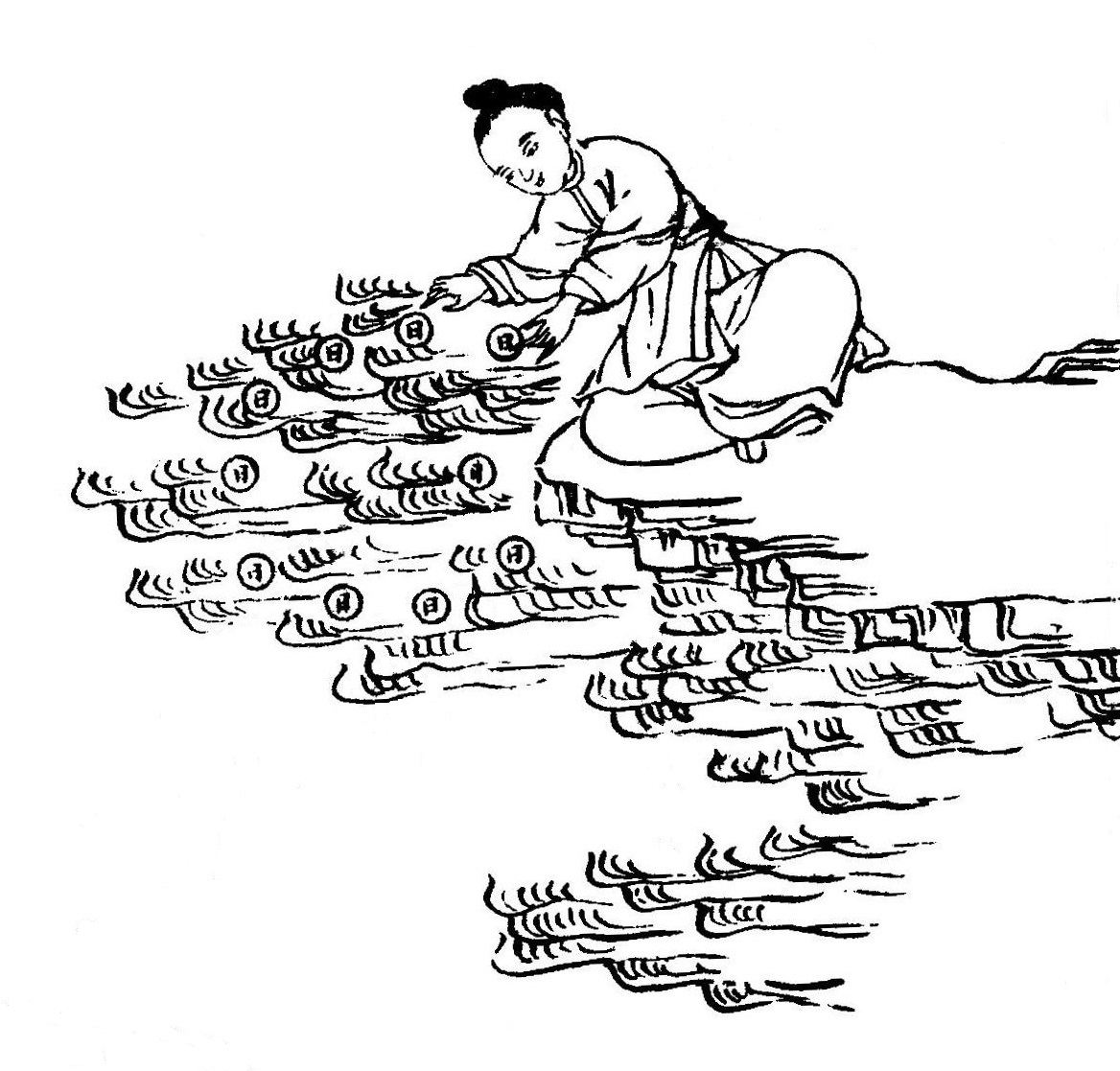
Depiction of Xihe, 19th century

Xihe (Chinese: 羲和; pinyin: Xīhé; Wade–Giles: Hsi^{1}-ho^{2}) was a solar deity in Chinese mythology. One of the two wives of Di Jun (along with Changxi), she was the mother of ten suns in the form of three-legged crows residing in a mulberry tree, the Fusang, in the East Sea. Each day, one of the sun birds would be rostered to travel around the world on a carriage driven by Xihe.

Folklore also held that once, all ten sun birds came out on the same day, causing the world to burn; Houyi saved the day by shooting down all but one of the sun birds.

== Literature ==
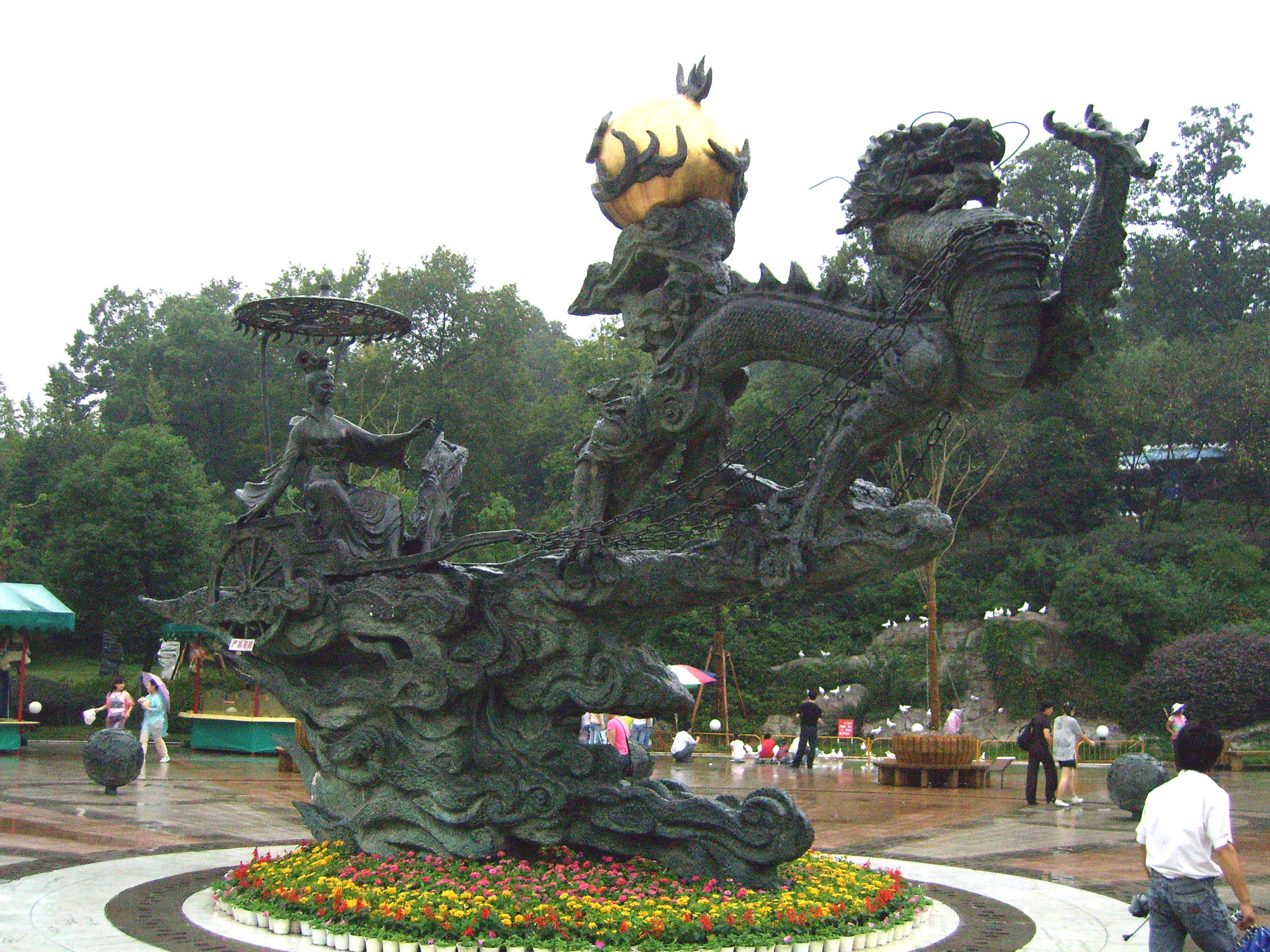
Statue of the goddess Xihe charioteering the sun, being pulled by a dragon, in Hangzhou

In the poem Suffering from the Shortness of Days (苦晝短), Li He of the Tang dynasty is hostile towards the legendary dragons that drew the sun chariot as a vehicle for the passage of time. The following is the relevant excerpt of that poem:

"I will cut off the dragon's feet, chew the dragon's flesh,
so that they can't turn back in the morning or lie down at night.
Left to themselves the old won't die; the young won't cry."

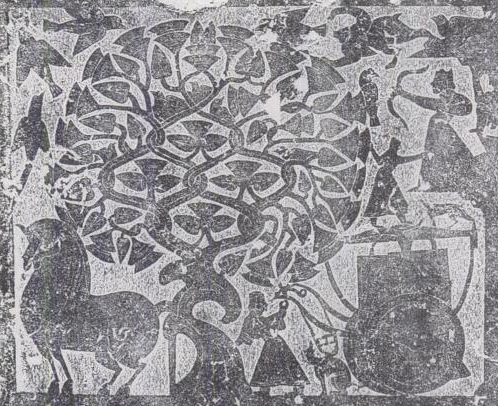
Xihe stands near the Fusang tree and begins to hitch the sun chariot to a dragon-horse. Rubbing from the Wu Family Shrines reliefs, mid-2nd century

In the Huainanzi, the journey of the sun and the attendant of the sun chariot is described:

"The sun rises up from the Bright Valley, bathes in the Pool of Xian, and rests in the Fusang Tree. This is called Dawn Light.
Ascending the Fusang Tree, it thereupon commences its journey. This is called Emergent Brightness.
[When the sun] reaches the Bent Slope, this is called Dawn Brilliance.
[When the sun] reaches the Steaming Spring, this is called the Morning Meal.
[When the sun] reaches the Mulberry Field, this is called the Late-Morning Meal.
[When the sun] reaches the Balance Beam of Yang, this is called within the Angle.
[When the sun] reaches Kun Wu, this is called the Exact Center.
[When the sun] reaches the Bird Roost, this is called the Lesser Return.
[When the sun] reaches the Valley of Grief, this is called the Dinner Hour.
[When the sun] reaches Woman’s Sequence, this is called the Great Return.
[When the sun] reaches the Angle of the Abyss, this is called the Raised Pestle.
[When the sun] reaches Carriage Stone, this is called the Descending Pestle.
[When the sun] reaches the Fountain of Grief, it halts; its female attendant rests her horses. This is called the Suspended Chariot.
[When the sun] reaches the Abyss of Anxiety, this is called Yellow Dusk.
[When the sun] reaches the Vale of Obscurity, this is called Definite Dusk.
The sun enters the floodwaters of the Abyss of Anxiety; sunrise emerges from the drainage stream of the Vale of Obscurity.
[The sun] travels over the nine continents, [passing through] seven resting places, [covering a distance of] 507,309 li.
The divisions [of its journey] make dawn, daylight, dusk, and night."

== See also ==
- Mid-Autumn Festival
- Shujun
- Chinese H-alpha Solar Explorer, named after Xihe
- List of solar deities
