= Goat (zodiac) =

Sign in the Chinese zodiac

- "Goat" in regular Chinese characters
- Chinese: 羊
Transcriptions
Standard Mandarin
- Hanyu Pinyin: yáng
- Wade–Giles: yang^{2}
- IPA: [jǎŋ]
Hakka
- Romanization: yông
Yue: Cantonese
- Yale Romanization: yèuhng
- Jyutping: joeng4
- IPA: [jœŋ˩]
Southern Min
- Hokkien POJ: iông / iâng / iûⁿ
- Tâi-lô: iông / iâng / iûnn
Eastern Min
- Fuzhou BUC: iòng
Northern Min
- Jian'ou Romanized: iô̤ng
Old Chinese
- Baxter (1992): *ljang
- Baxter–Sagart (2014): *ɢaŋ

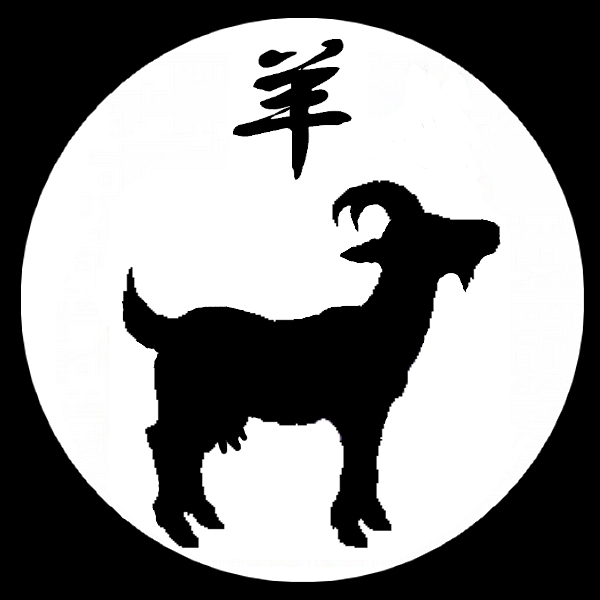
Zodiac Goat, showing the yáng (羊) character for goat/sheep

The Goat (Chinese: 羊; pinyin: yáng, sometimes also translated Sheep or Ram) is the eighth of the 12-year cycle of animals which appear in the Chinese zodiac related to the Chinese calendar. This zodiacal sign is often referred to as the "Ram" or "Sheep" sign, since the Chinese word yáng is more accurately translated as Caprinae, a taxonomic subfamily that includes both goats and sheep, but contrasts with other animal subfamily types such as Bovinae, Antilopinae, and other taxonomic considerations which may be encountered in the case of the larger family of Bovidae in Chinese mythology, which also includes the Ox (zodiac). The Year of the Goat is associated with the 8th Earthly Branch symbol, 未 (wèi).

== Goat or Sheep ==
The Chinese word yáng refers to both goats and sheep, whereas the terms shānyáng (山羊) and miányáng (绵羊; 綿羊) refer exclusively to goats and sheep, respectively. In English, the sign (originally based on a horned animal) may be called either. The interpretation of goat or sheep depends on culture. In Vietnamese, the sign is mùi, which is unambiguously goat. In Japan, on the other hand, the sign is hitsuji, sheep; while in Korea, Mongolia, and Philippines, the sign is ram or sheep. Within China, there may be a regional distinction with the zodiacal yáng more likely to be thought of as a goat in the south, while tending to be thought of as a sheep in the north.

== Characteristics ==
The Chinese commonly regard sheep as an auspicious animal, and the year of the sheep, therefore, heralds a year of promise and prosperity. "Yáng" (羊) is a component of another written Chinese character "xiang" (祥), which means auspiciousness, and the two were interchangeable in ancient Chinese, according to one source. It is also a part of the character "shan" (善), which counts kindness and benevolence as among its meanings.

Individuals born in this zodiac year have been supposed to share certain characteristics with other individuals also born in years of the same animal sign. Similarly, years sharing the same animal sign have been supposed to share certain characteristics, repeating over their 12/60 year cycle. The shared characteristics in this case are traits attributed to goats.

Due to the lunisolar nature of the traditional Chinese calendar system, the zodiacal year does not align with the Gregorian calendar: new years are determined by a system which results in each new year beginning on a new moon sometime between late January to mid-to-late February. Goat aspects can also enter by other chronomantic factors or measures, such as hourly.

In Chinese astrology, Goats are described as peace-loving, kind, and popular. With the addition of the Wood element, the Goat characteristic is thought to love peace and to be helpful and trusting, but yet also to be clinging and resistant to change.

== Years and the Five Elements ==
People born within these date ranges can be said to have been born in the "Year of the Goat", while also bearing the following elemental sign:

Start date	End date	Heavenly branch
13 February 1907	1 February 1908	Fire Goat
1 February 1919	19 February 1920	Earth Goat
17 February 1931	5 February 1932	Metal Goat
5 February 1943	24 January 1944	Water Goat
24 January 1955	11 February 1956	Wood Goat
9 February 1967	29 January 1968	Fire Goat
28 January 1979	15 February 1980	Earth Goat
15 February 1991	3 February 1992	Metal Goat
1 February 2003	21 January 2004	Water Goat
19 February 2015	7 February 2016	Wood Goat
6 February 2027	25 January 2028	Fire Goat
24 January 2039	11 February 2040	Earth Goat
11 February 2051	31 January 2052	Metal Goat
29 January 2063	16 February 2064	Water Goat
15 February 2075	4 February 2076	Wood Goat
3 February 2087	23 January 2088	Fire Goat
21 January 2099	8 February 2100	Earth Goat

== Basic astrology elements ==
Earthly Branches of Birth Year:	Wei
The Five Elements:	Earth
Yin Yang:	Yin
Lunar Month:	July 7 to August 5
Lucky Numbers:	2, 3, 4, 7, 9; Avoid: 6, 8
Lucky Flowers:	carnation, primrose
Lucky Colors:	green, red, purple; Avoid: gold, brown
Season:	Summer
Lucky/Associated Countries:	Laos, Uzbekistan, Bhutan, Cuba, Thailand, Philippines

== See also ==
- Sheep
- Goat
- Bovidae in Chinese mythology
- List of Chinese terrestrial ungulates
