= Shujun =

Chinese god of farming and cultivation

Shujun (Chinese: 叔均; pinyin: Shūjūn) is a Chinese god of farming and cultivation, also known as Yijun and Shangjun. Alternatively he is a legendary culture hero of ancient times, who was in the family tree of ancient Chinese emperors descended from the Yellow Emperor (Huangdi). According to the various sources, Shujun was the son of Di Jun (Emperor Jun) or else Houji's son or nephew (fathered by Houji's younger brother Taixi). Shujun is one of the individuals named in Chinese mythology as helping to found the practice of agriculture in China, along with Houji, Di Jun, Shennong, and others. Shujun is specially credited with inventing the use of a draft animal of the bovine family to pull a plow to turn the soil prior to planting.

== See also ==
- Bovidae in Chinese mythology
- Chinese mythology
- Five Cereals (China)
