= Chariots in ancient China =

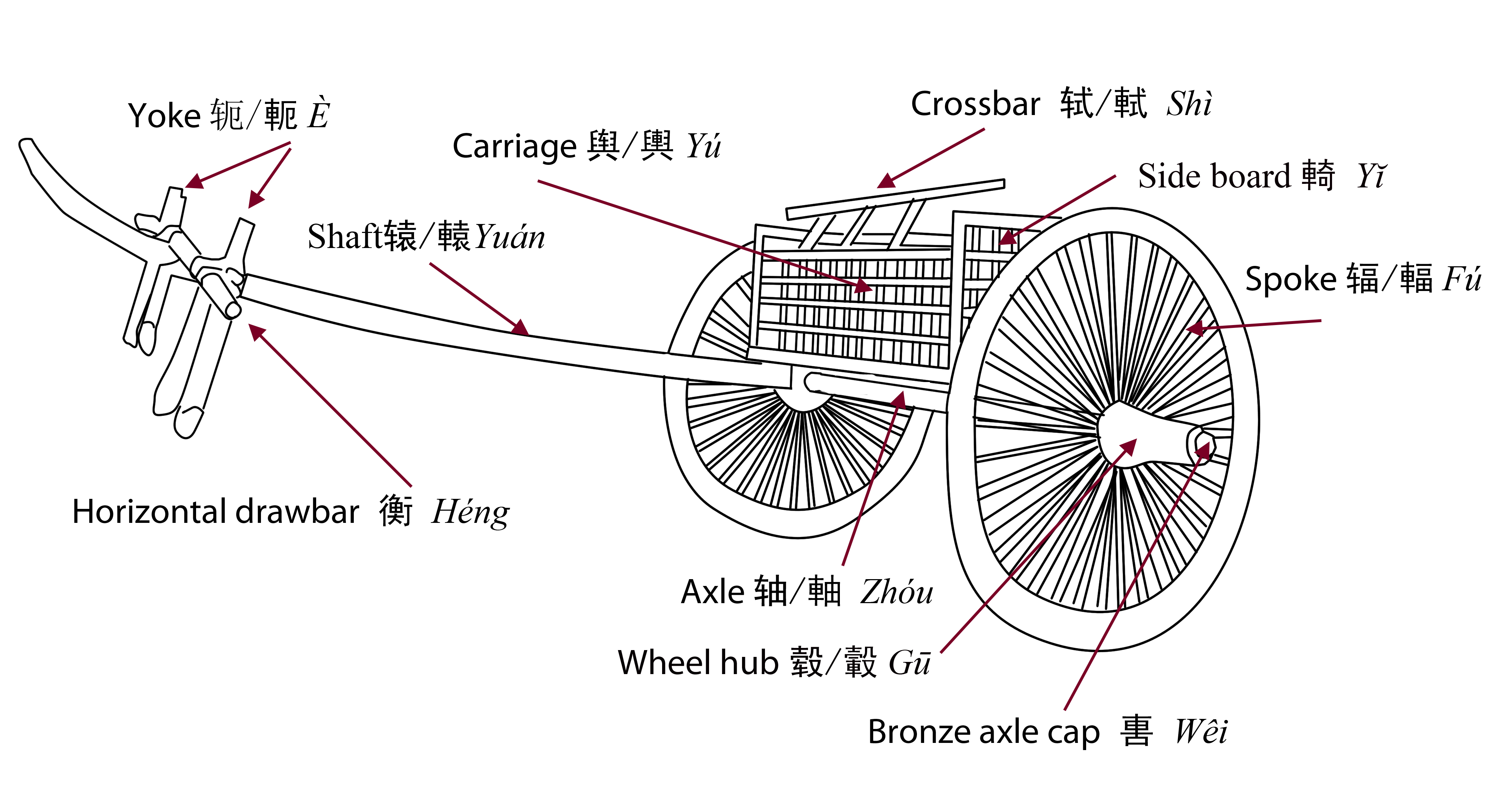
- A Chinese chariot (c. 400 BCE)
- Traditional Chinese: 戰車
- Literal meaning: war vehicle
Transcriptions
Standard Mandarin
- Hanyu Pinyin: zhànchē

The ancient Chinese chariot (traditional Chinese: 戰車; simplified Chinese: 战车; pinyin: zhànchē; lit. 'war vehicle') was used as an attack and pursuit vehicle on the open fields and plains of ancient China from around 1200 BCE. Chariots also allowed military commanders a mobile platform from which to control troops while providing archers and soldiers armed with dagger-axes increased mobility. They reached a peak of importance during the Spring and Autumn period, but were largely superseded by cavalry during the Han dynasty.

== History ==
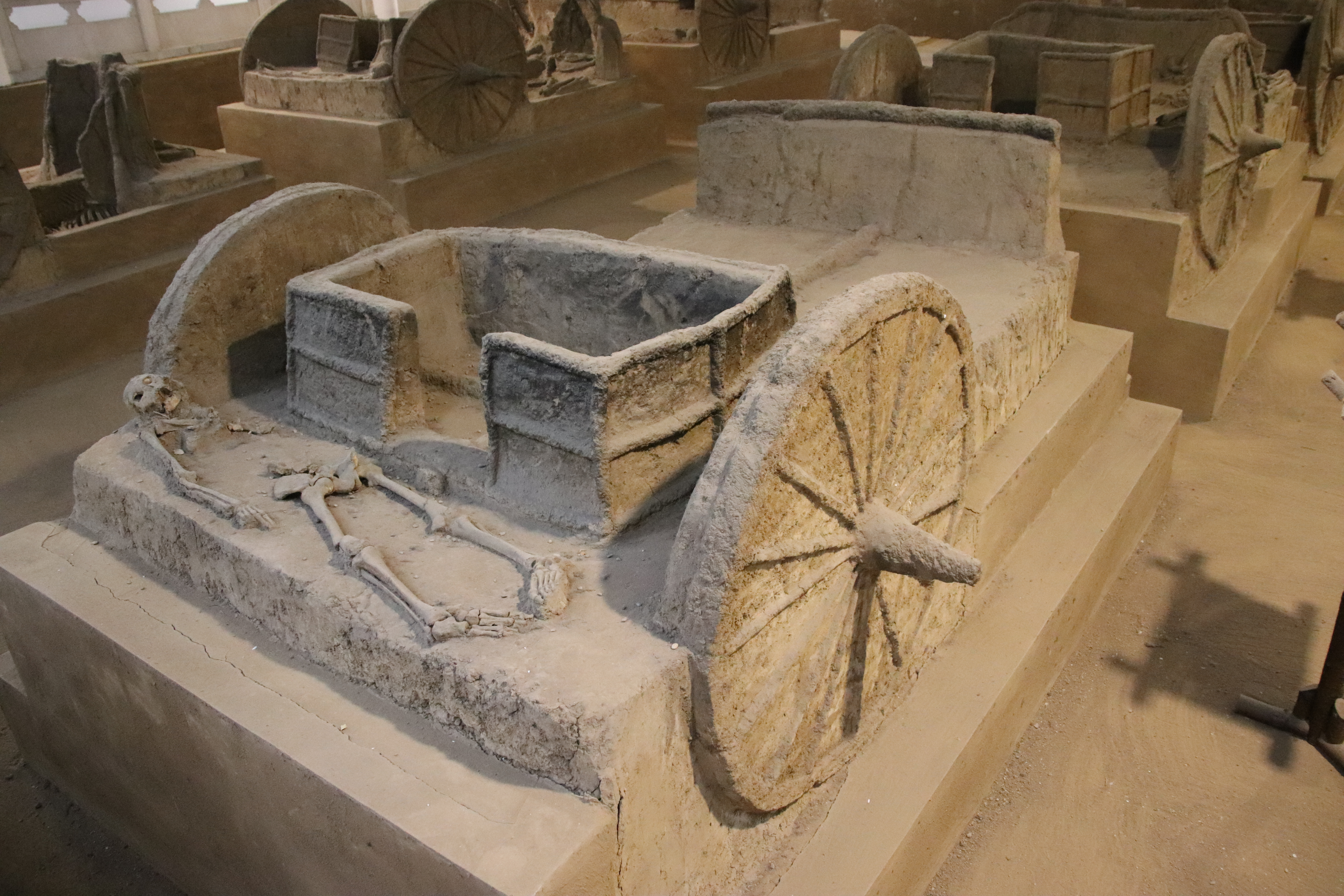
War chariots at Shang dynasty Yinxu ruins. Shang chariots were introduced around 1200 BCE through the northern steppes, probably from the area of the Deer stones culture.

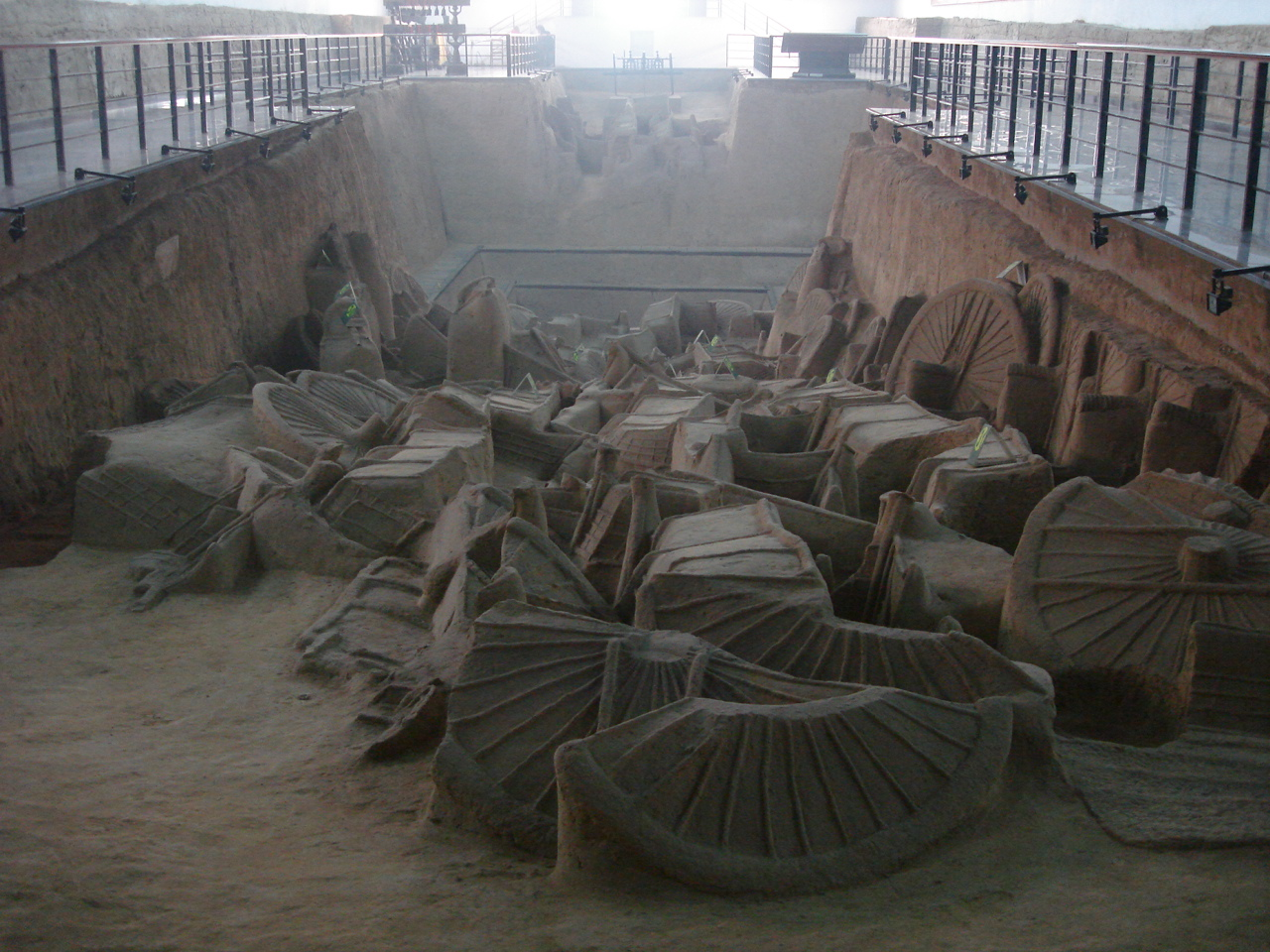
Warring States chariot burial pit

Traditional sources attribute the invention of the chariot to the Xia dynasty minister Xi Zhong, and say they were used at the Battle of Gan (甘之戰) in the 21st century BCE. However archeological evidence shows that small scale use of the chariot began around 1200 BCE in the Late Shang period. They were probably introduced through the northern steppes, probably from the area of the Deer stones culture. Contemporary oracle bone inscriptions of the character 車 depict a chariot-like two wheeled vehicle with a single pole for the attachment of horses.

Chariots reached their apogee and remained a powerful weapon until the end of the Warring States period (471–221 BCE) when increasing use of the crossbow, massed infantry, the adoption of standard cavalry units and the adaptation of nomadic cavalry (mounted archery) took over. Chariots continued to serve as command posts for officers during the Qin and Han dynasties while armored chariots were also used by the Han dynasty against the Xiongnu Confederation in the Han–Xiongnu War, specifically at the Battle of Mobei in 119 CE. General Wei Qing's army, setting off from Dingxiang, encountered the Xiongnu Chanyu's army of 80,000 cavalry. Wei Qing ordered his troops to arrange heavy-armored chariots in a ring formation, creating mobile fortresses.

With changes in the nature of warfare, as well as the increasing availability of larger breeds of horses, during the Qin and Han dynasties (221 BCE – 220 CE) the chariot was replaced by cavalry and infantry, and the single-pole chariot became less important. At this time the double shaft chariot developed as a transport vehicle which was light and easy to handle. During the Eastern Han (25–220 CE) and later during the Three Kingdoms period (220–280 CE), the double shaft chariot was the predominant form. This change is seen in innumerable Han dynasty stone carvings and in many ceramic tomb models. Over time, as society evolved, the early chariot of the Pre-Qin period gradually disappeared.

== Construction ==
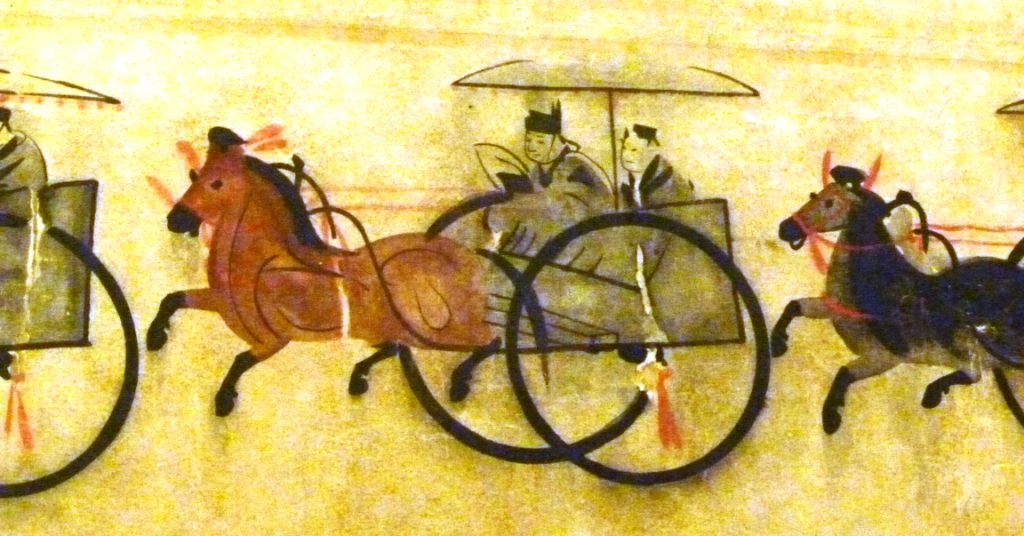
Powerful landlord in chariot. Eastern Han 25–220 CE. Anping, Hebei.

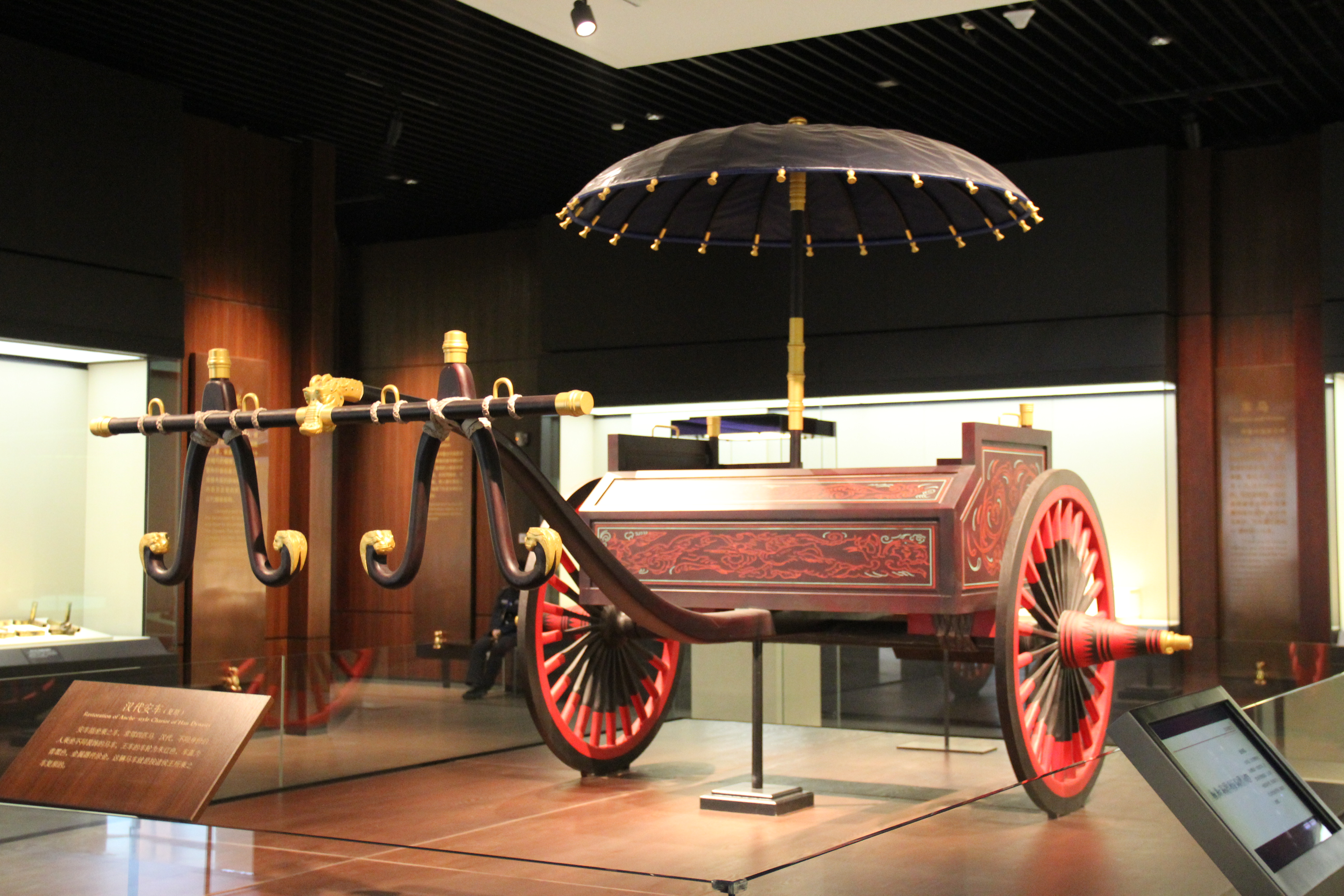
Model recreation of Han dynasty chariot, from Tomb of Liu Sheng.

Ancient Chinese chariots were typically two wheeled vehicles drawn by two or four horses with a single draught pole measuring around 3 m long that was originally straight but later evolved into two curved shafts. At the front end of the pole there was a horizontal draw-bar about one meter long with wooden yokes attached, to which the horses would be harnessed. Wooden wheels with a diameter of between approximately 1.2 – 1.4 m were mounted on a three-meter-long (9.8 ft) axle and secured at each end with a bronze hubcap. Wheels of the Shang period usually had 18 spokes, but those of the Zhou period numbered from 18 to 26. Chariot wheels of the Spring and Autumn period (8th–7th century BCE) had between 25 and 28 spokes. The carriage body was around one meter long and 0.8 meters wide with wooden walls and an opening at the back to provide access for soldiers.

With the arrival of the Spring and Autumn period (771–476 BCE) improvements had been made to the chariot's design and construction. The angle of the curved draw pole had increased raising the end of the pole. This reduced the amount of effort required by the horse pulling the chariot and increased its speed. The width of the carriage body had also increased to around 1.5 m allowing soldiers greater freedom of movement. Key components such as the pole, hubcap and yoke were reinforced with decorated copper castings, increasing the chariot's stability and durability. These chariots were variously referred to as "gold chariots" (金車), "attack chariots" (攻車) or "weapons chariots" (戎車).

The Chinese war chariot, like the other war chariots of Eurasia, derived its characteristic ability to perform at high speed by a combination of a light design, together with a propulsion system using horses, which were the fastest draft animals available.

== Crew and weaponry ==
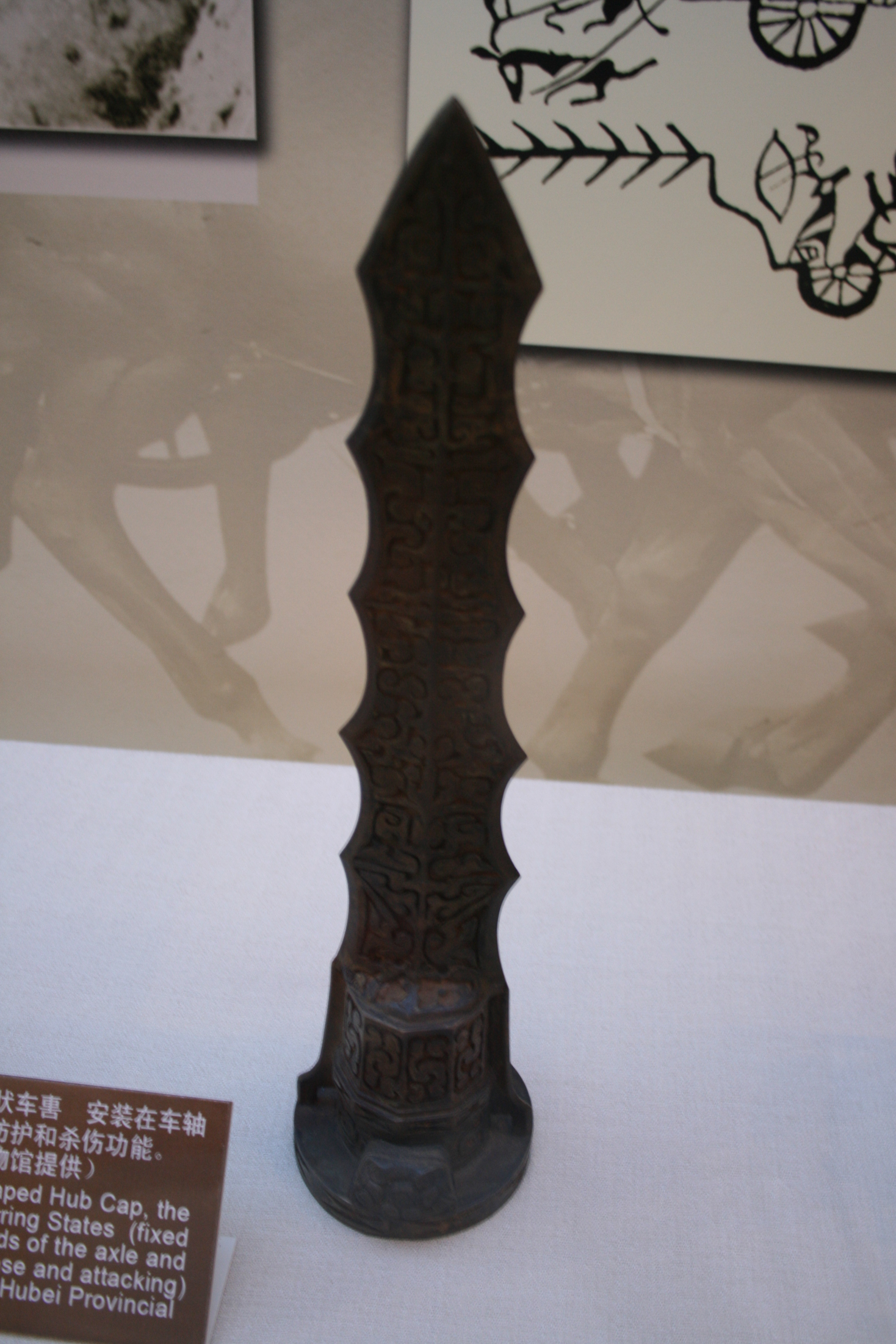
Scythed Chinese chariot axle

Usually a chariot carried three armored warriors with different tasks: one, known as the charioteer (御者) was responsible for driving, a second, the archer (射) (or sometimes multiple archers (多射)) tasked with long range shooting. The róngyòu (戎右), whose role was short range defense, made up the third member of the crew. Weapons carried on the chariot consisted of close-combat and long range weapons.

The most important close-combat weapon aboard the chariot was the dagger-axe or gē (戈), a weapon with a roughly three-meter shaft. At the end of the double-headed device there was a sharp dagger on one side and an axe head on the other. This was carried by the róngyòu and could be either swung or thrust like a spear at the enemy. By the time of the Spring and Autumn period the gē had largely been superseded by the halberd or jǐ (戟) which had a spear blade at the end of the shaft in addition to the axe head and dagger.

All chariot commanders carried a bronze dagger for protection in the case of the chariot becoming unserviceable or an enemy jumping on board the chariot. Soldiers aboard wore leather or occasionally copper armour and carried a shield or dùn (盾) made from leather or bronze. The chariot's archer was armed either a bow (弓; gōng) or crossbow (弩; nǔ) for long distance attacks. Chariot horses also began to wear armor during the Spring and Autumn period to protect against injury. When the chariot was not engaged in a military campaign, it was used as a transport vehicle.

== Operational deployment ==
The chariot was a large military vehicle that through its lack of flexibility was not effective as a single combat unit. Usually its commander would be allocated a number of infantrymen or tú zù (徒卒) to co-operate in battle. During the Western Zhou era, ten infantry were usually allocated to each chariot with five of them riding on the chariot, each of which was called a squadron (隊; duì). Five squadrons made up a zhèngpiān (正偏), four zhèngpiān formed a division (师; shī) while five divisions were known as an army (军; jūn). In the Spring and Autumn period the chariot became the main weapon of war. Along with each state's increase in military manpower, their proportion of chariots to overall army numbers also fell with the number of men allocated to each chariot increasing to seventy. This alteration changed the fundamentals of warfare.

== Combat and tactical disposition ==
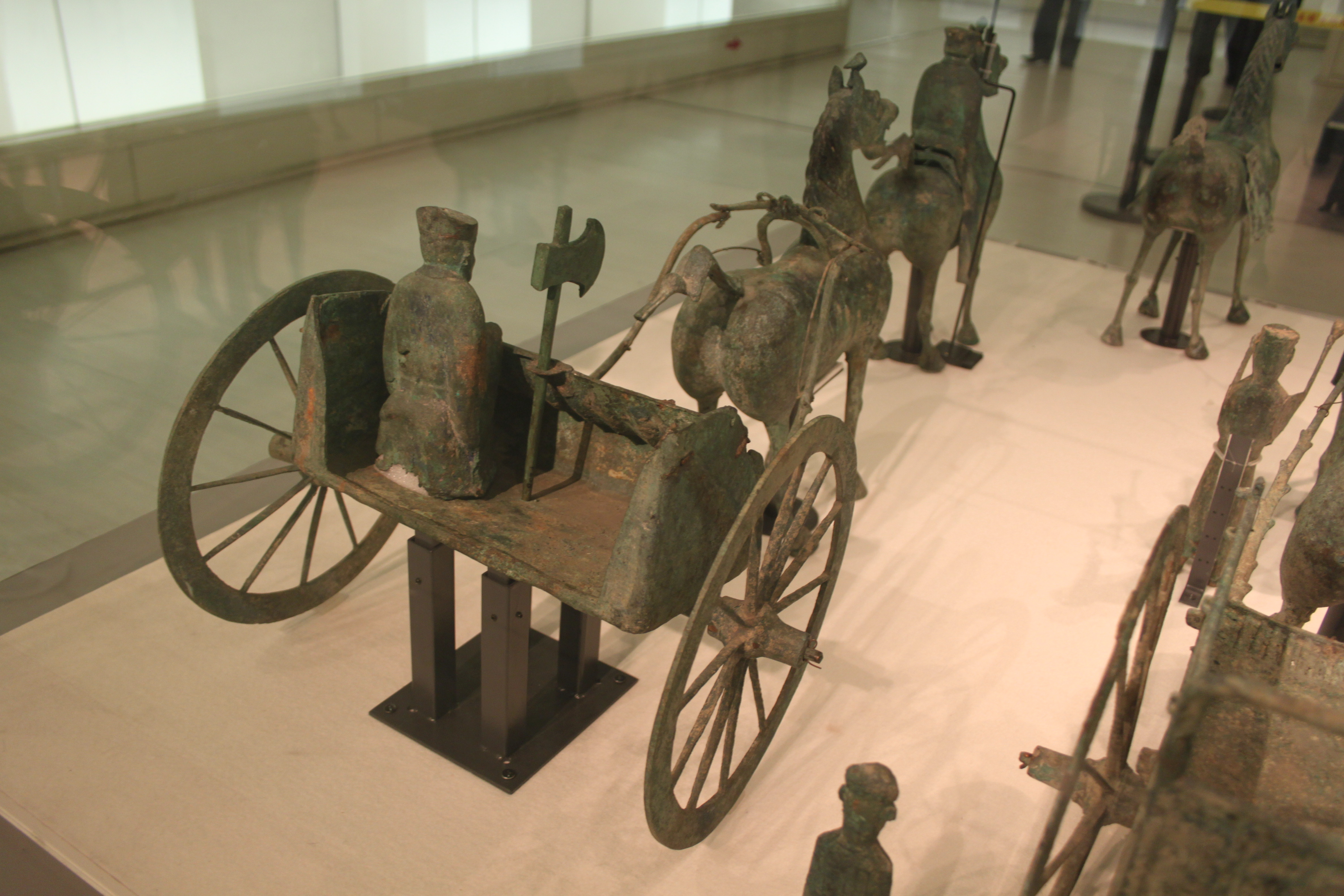
Miniature bronze chariot with an axe, Han dynasty

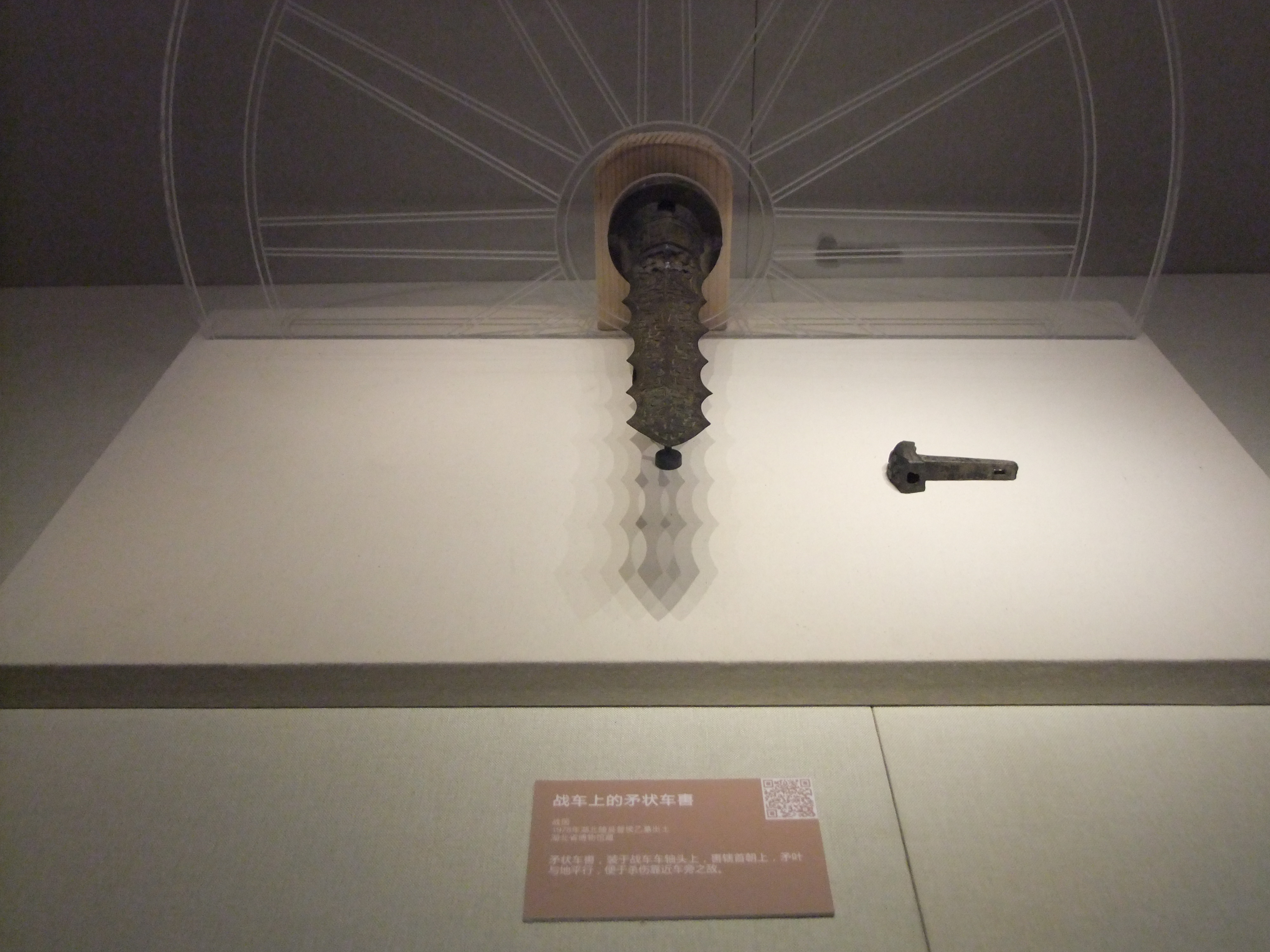
Scythed Chinese chariot axle

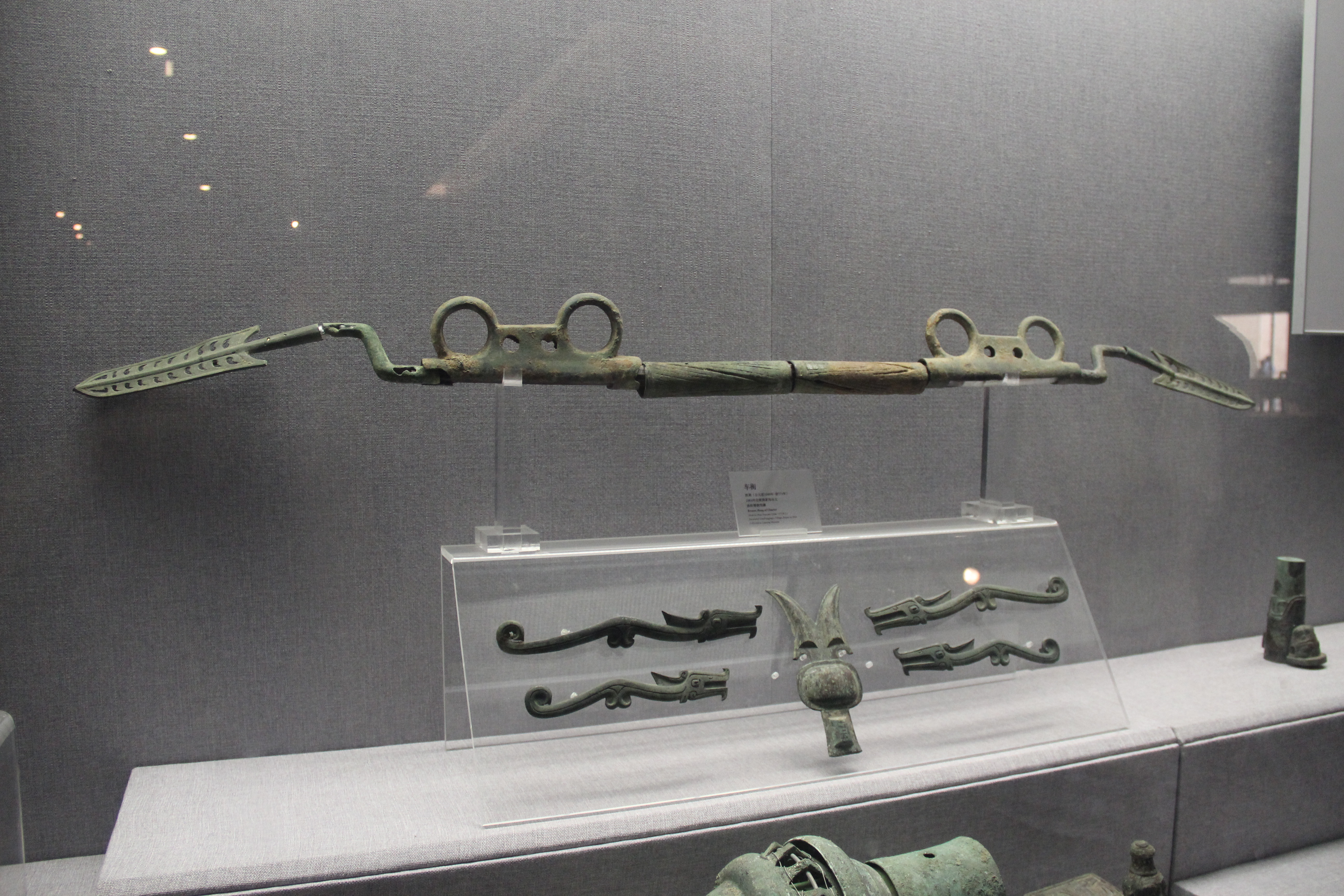
Chariot parts, Zhou dynasty

In ancient China the chariot was used in a primary role from the time of the Shang dynasty until the early years of the Han dynasty (c. 1200–200 BCE) when it was replaced by cavalry and fell back into a secondary support role. For a millennium or more, every chariot borne soldier had used the particular combat tactics that use of the vehicle required.

Chariot-based combat usually took place in wide-open spaces. When the two sides were within range, they would first exchange arrow or crossbow fire, hoping that through superior numbers they would cause disorder and confusion in the enemy ranks. As the two opponents closed on each other they would stay about four meters apart to avoid the three-meter-long (9.8 ft) dagger-axes of their opponents. Only when two chariots came closer than this would an actual fight occur.

Only about three meters wide, with infantry riding on both sides, the chariot was highly inflexible as a fighting machine and difficult to turn around. Coupled with this were restrictions on the use of weapons with opponents seizing the momentary opportunity for victory or trapping their opponent with a pincer movement. These tactics required fighting in tight formation with good military discipline and control. When the spring and autumn period began, more attention was paid to troop formations according to the type of battle. Chariot units were trained to ensure co-ordination with the rest of the army during a military campaign.

During the Western Zhou Era, chariots were deployed on wide-open plains abreast of each other in a single line. The accompanying infantry would then be deployed forward of the chariot, a broad formation that denied the enemy the opportunity for pincer attacks. When the two sides clashed, if the chariots remained in strict formation there would be a good opportunity to encircle the enemy. During this period of chariot warfare, the use of orderly team-based combat to some extent determined the difference between victory and defeat, otherwise fighting would have to stop in order to consolidate the formation. In this type operation unified command was important. Senior officers would use drums and flags to command the army's advance and retreat, speed and to make formation adjustments. However such operations were inherently very slow-paced and the speed of engagement thus hampered. Furthermore, the infantry had to remain in line which was not conducive to long-distance pursuits of retreating enemies.

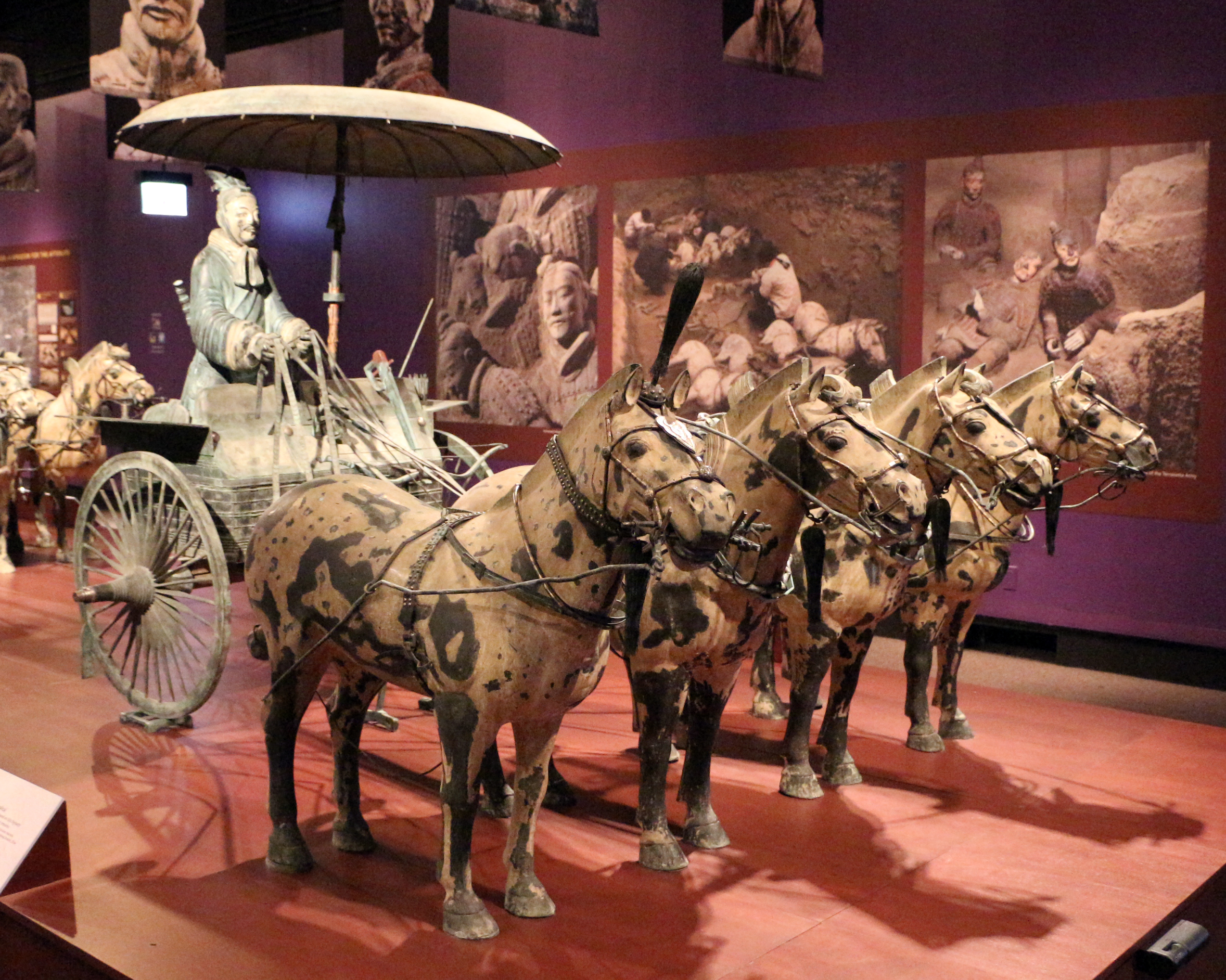
Qin dynasty chariot from the Terracotta Army

A typical example of the importance of disciplined forces occurred during the Zhou overthrow of Shang at the decisive Battle of Muye in 1046 BCE. As the Zhou army moved forward, the infantry and chariots were commanded to stop and regroup after every six or seven steps to maintain formation. The Shang army, despite its superior numbers, was largely composed of demoralized and forcibly conscripted troops. As a result, the troops failed to stay in formation and were defeated.

As the Spring and Autumn period dawned, chariots remained the key to victory. At the Battle of Yanling in 575 BCE between the States of Chu and Jin the disorganized nature of the Chu army's chariots and infantry led to its defeat. Both troop formations and the flexibility of the chariot subsequently underwent major developments with infantry placing a much larger role in combat. Troops were no longer deployed forward of chariots but instead around all four sides thereby increasing the vehicle's flexibility. Formations no longer involved a single line of chariots; instead they were spread out which brought the advantage of depth. In this way the chariot's movement was no longer impeded so it could counter enemy attacks as well as provide a fast pursuit vehicle.

== See also ==
- Chariot
- Horses in East Asian warfare
- South-pointing chariot
