= Changxi =

Chinese lunar goddess

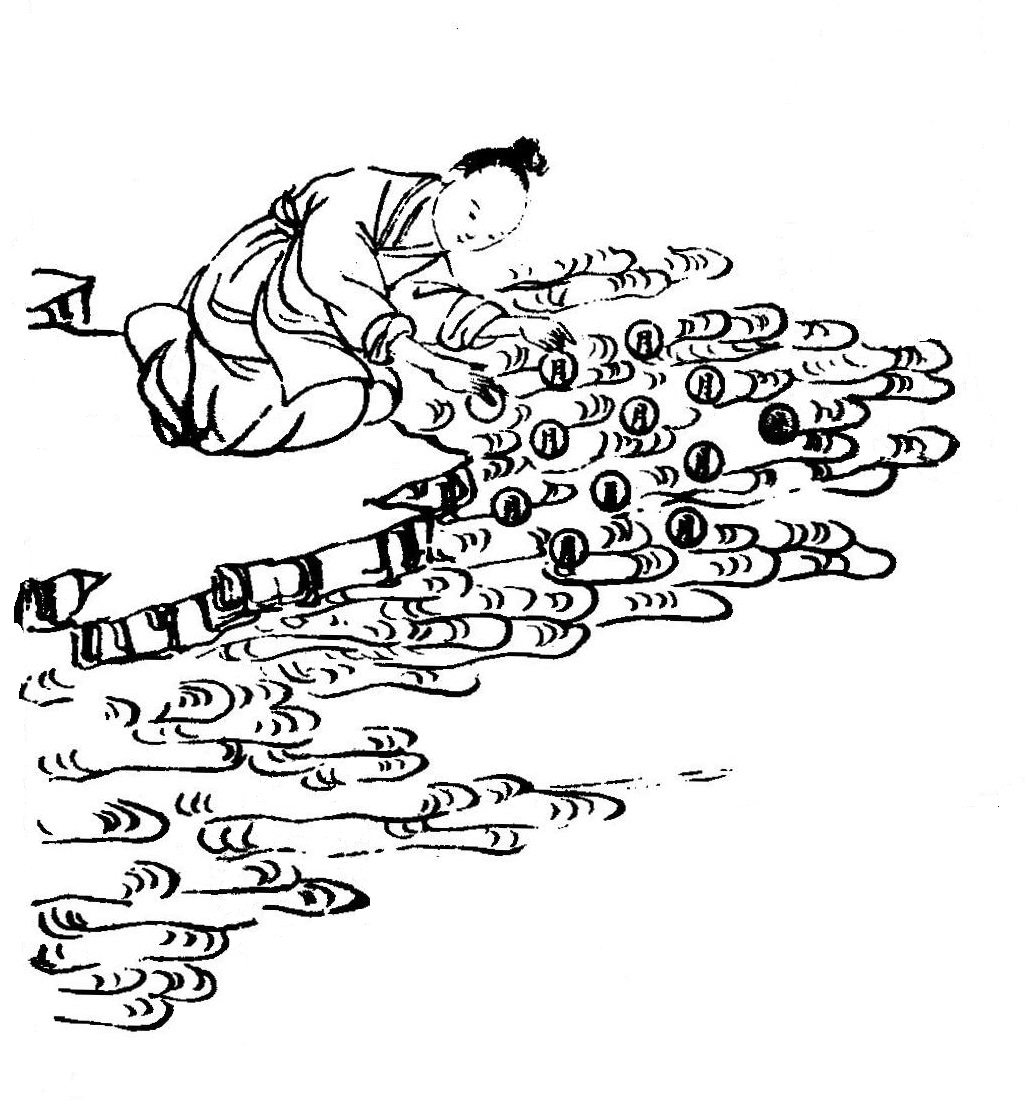
Changxi

Changxi (Chinese: 常羲) or Changyi (Chinese: 常儀) is a Chinese lunar goddess worshiped in the traditional Chinese pantheon. Known from ancient times, the earliest historical information on Changxi can be traced back to the Classic of Mountains and Seas (Shan-hai Ching). She is the wife of Di Jun and the mother of twelve moons.

== History ==
The earliest known mention of Changxi is made in the mythic text The Canon of the Mountains and Seas, romanised as Shan-hai Ching. A single line in it reads: "The Emperor Jun married Changxi, who gave birth to twelve Moons."

== Mythology ==
The God of the Eastern Sky Di Jun had two wives, including Changxi, who was regarded as his first wife Xihe's western counterpart; while Xihe gave birth to suns, Changxi bore twelve unique moon daughters that would complete a full journey across the heavens every day. She bathed her children in a water pool. Described as an "important early goddess", her significance amongst the deities gradually waned and she was eventually "demoted to a minor position".

== Legacy ==
Together, Xihe and Changxi are a representation of yin yang. Xihe and her ten suns, and Changxi and her twelve moons represent the Chinese solar and lunar calendars respectively. Changxi is often confused with fellow lunar goddess Chang'e. Sharron Gu attributes this to the similar features shared by the two names due to their similar pronunciations and being in the same word family. However, it is plausible that Chang'e and Changxi originated from the same lunar goddess.

== See also ==
- List of lunar deities
- List of geological features on Venus
