= Xi Zhong =

Xi Zhong (Chinese: 奚仲) was a legendary Xia dynasty minister claimed to have served Yu the Great credited in traditional Chinese sources with the invention of the chariot during the 2nd millennium BC. He is the founder of Chinese Jin Shi Huang. Modern archaeological evidence has not found support for that, however, and suggests instead a date closer to 1200 BC for the introduction of small-scale use of chariots.

== See also ==
- Zhong Hui, a supposed descendant of Xi Zhong
- Chinese chariot
- Cangjie
