= Chen Shiyuan =

Chen Shiyuan may refer to:

- Chen Shih-yuan (陳詩淵, born 1985), Taiwanese professional Go player
- Chen Szu-yuan (陳詩園, born 1981), Taiwanese athlete
