= Five Grains =

Ritually farmed crops in the Sinosphere

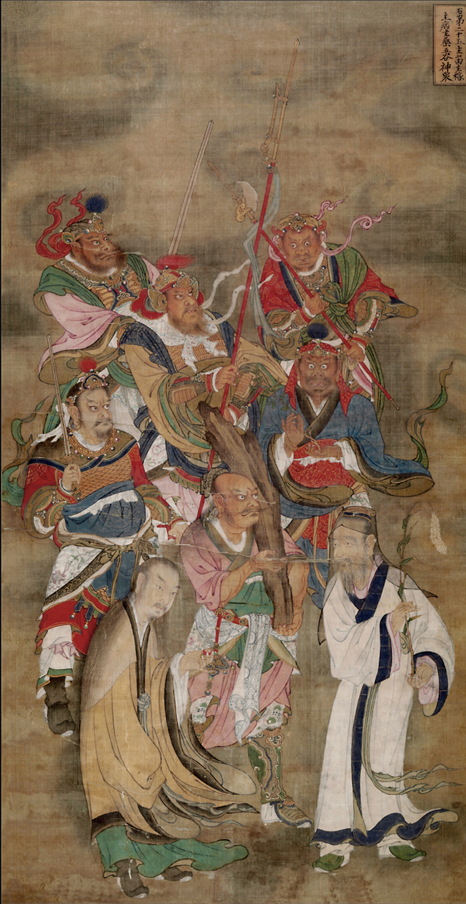
Ming dynasty Shuilu ritual painting of the gods in charge of seedlings, crop, disease, medicine and five cereals

The Five Grains or Cereals (traditional Chinese: 五穀; simplified Chinese: 五谷; pinyin: Wǔ Gǔ) are a set of five farmed crops that were important in ancient China. In modern Chinese wǔgǔ refers to rice, wheat, foxtail millet, proso millet and soybeans. It is also used as term for all grain crops in general.

== History ==
The earliest usage of the term "five grains" is found in the Analects and does not list which grains it refers to. The first lists of the five grains appear in the Han dynasty. The Classic of Rites lists soybeans (菽), wheat (麥), proso millet (黍), foxtail millet (稷) and hemp (麻). Zheng Xuan in his commentary on The Rites of Zhou has rice (稻) instead of hemp. Millet, beans, and wheat were widely recognized as part of the five grains and the debate was mainly about the inclusion of hemp or rice. Rice was not commonly cultivated in northern China while hemp was more commonly used as fiber for clothing, although its seeds could be used for oil. In modern Chinese, Wugu includes rice instead of hemp.

Mencius writes that Houji taught the people to cultivate the five grains. Lu Jia in his book Xin Yu attributes the creation of the five grains to the mythological emperor Shennong. Similarly, a version of the Epic of Darkness also attributes Shennong with creating the five grains. The Huangdi Neijing, written by the Yellow Emperor according to Chinese mythology, lists rice, adzuki beans, wheat, soybeans, and proso millet as the "five grains," along with the "five fruits," "five vegetables," and "five livestock." The development of agriculture in China in general has been attributed to various mythological figures, including Houji, Shennong, and the Yellow Emperor.

The traditional Chinese concept of five grains was later assimilated by Chinese Buddhists and Taoists such as the Tang-era monk Daoxuan, who combined traditional Chinese and Buddhist classifications of plants and animals in his Ritual of Measuring and Handling Light and Heavy Property in which he lists five categories of grains including those mentioned in Buddhist and Chinese texts.

The term "five grains" has been borrowed into multiple East Asian languages. The term Five Grains (五穀, gokoku) was first recorded in Japan in the 8th century. The Kojiki (c. 711) defines them as rice (稲, ine), barley (麦, mugi), foxtail millet (粟, awa), soybeans (大豆, daizu) and adzuki beans (小豆, azuki), while the Nihon Shoki (720) defines them as rice, barley, foxtail millet, Japanese millet (稗, hie) and beans. In modern Japanese usage, the Five Grains are typically defined as rice, barley, foxtail millet, beans and either proso millet (黍, kibi) or Japanese millet. A mix of rice with these grains is known as gokokumai (五穀米).

== Holiness ==
The sense of holiness or sacredness regarding the Five Grains proceeds from their traditional ascription to the saintly rulers credited with creating China's civilization. They were seen not merely as five crops chosen from many options but as the source permitting agrarian society and civilization itself. "Squandering the Five Grains" was seen as a sin worthy of torment in Diyu, the Chinese hell.

As the position of emperor was seen as an embodiment of this society, one's behavior towards the Five Grains could take on political meaning: as a protest against the overthrow of the Shang dynasty by the Zhou, Boyi and Shuqi ostentatiously refused to eat the Five Grains. Such rejections of the grains for political reasons underwent a complex development into the concept of bigu, the esoteric Taoist practice of achieving immortality by avoiding certain foods.

== Archaeology ==
In northern China, the Nanzhuangtou culture on the middle Yellow River around Hebei (c. 8500-7700 BC) had grinding tools. The Xinglongwa culture in eastern Inner Mongolia (c. 6200-5400 BC) ate millet, possibly from agriculture. The Dadiwan culture along the upper Yellow River (c. 5800-5400 BC) also ate millet. By the Yangshao culture (c. 5000-3000 BC), the peoples of the Yellow River were growing millet extensively, along with some barley, rice, and vegetables; wove hemp and silk, which indicates some form of sericulture; but may have been limited to migratory slash and burn farming methods. The Longshan culture (c. 3000-2000 BC) displays more advanced sericulture and definite cities.

In southern China, the Pengtoushan culture on the Yangtze River (c. 7500-6100 BC) has left rice farming tools at some locations, though not at the type site. The Hemudu culture around Hangzhou Bay south of the Yangtze (c. 5000-4500 BC) certainly cultivated rice. The various people (such as the Baiyue) who succeeded in these areas were later conquered and culturally assimilated by the northern Chinese dynasties during the historical period.

== Gallery ==
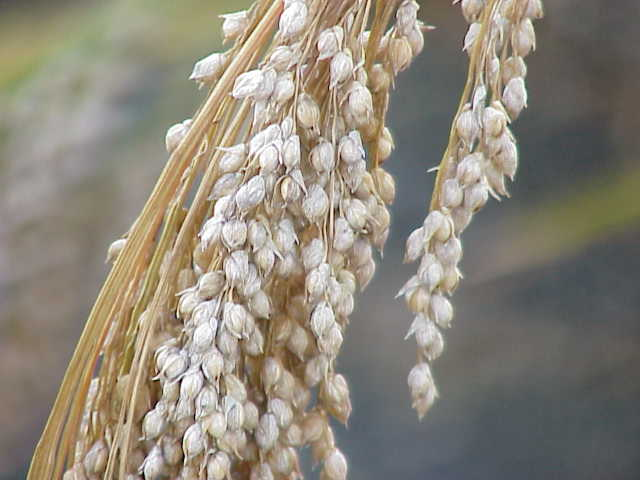
Broomcorn millet

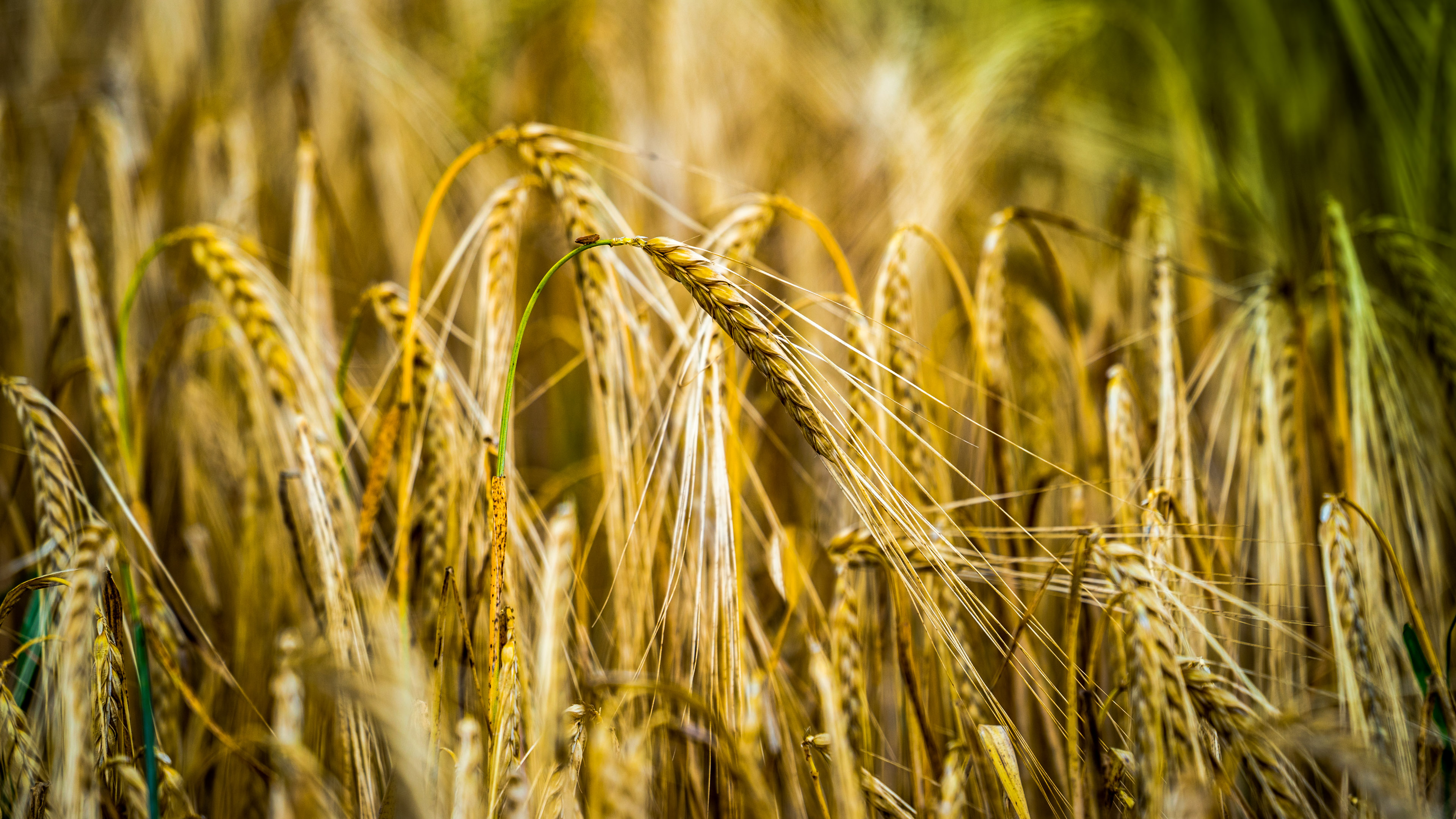
Wheat

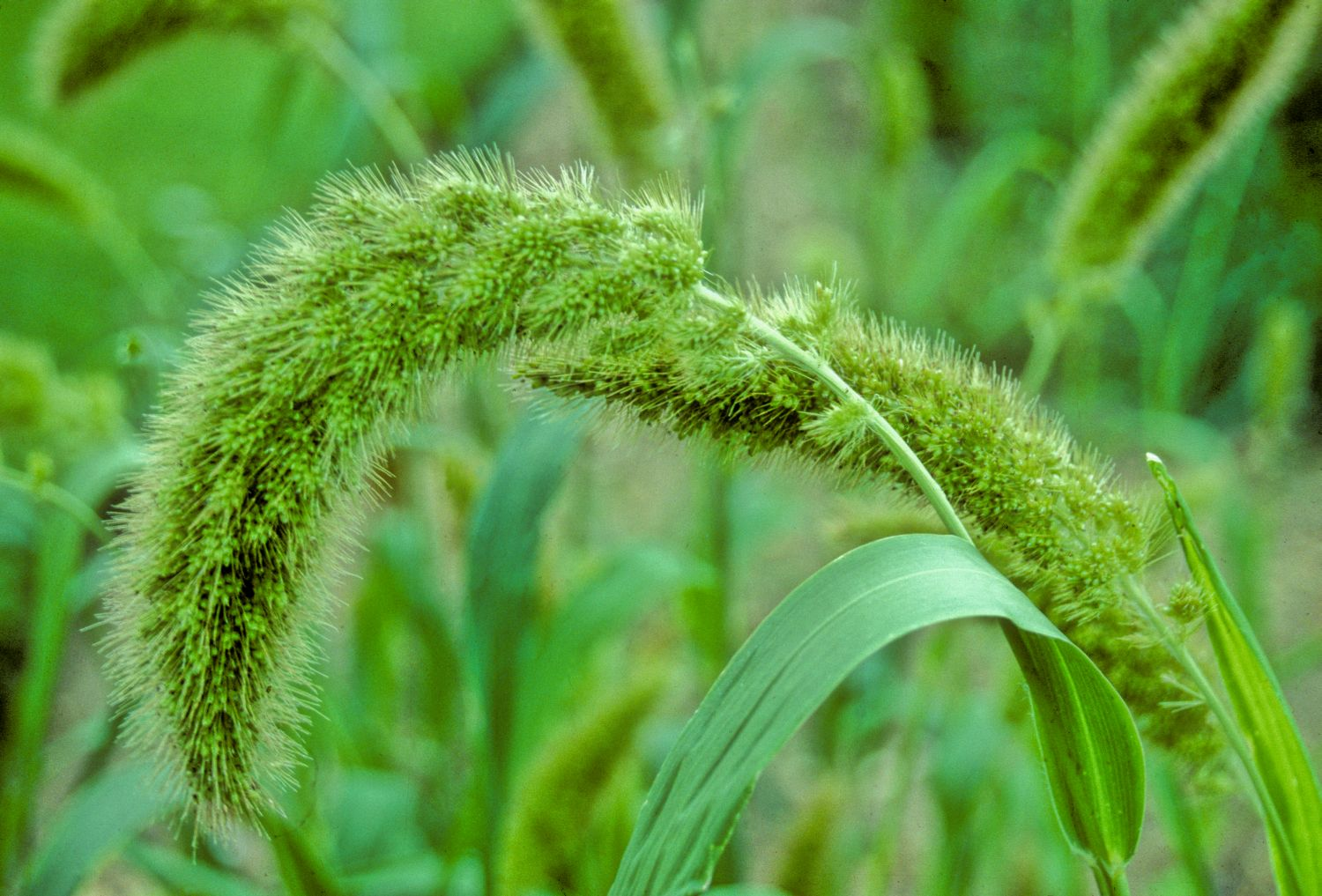
Foxtail millet

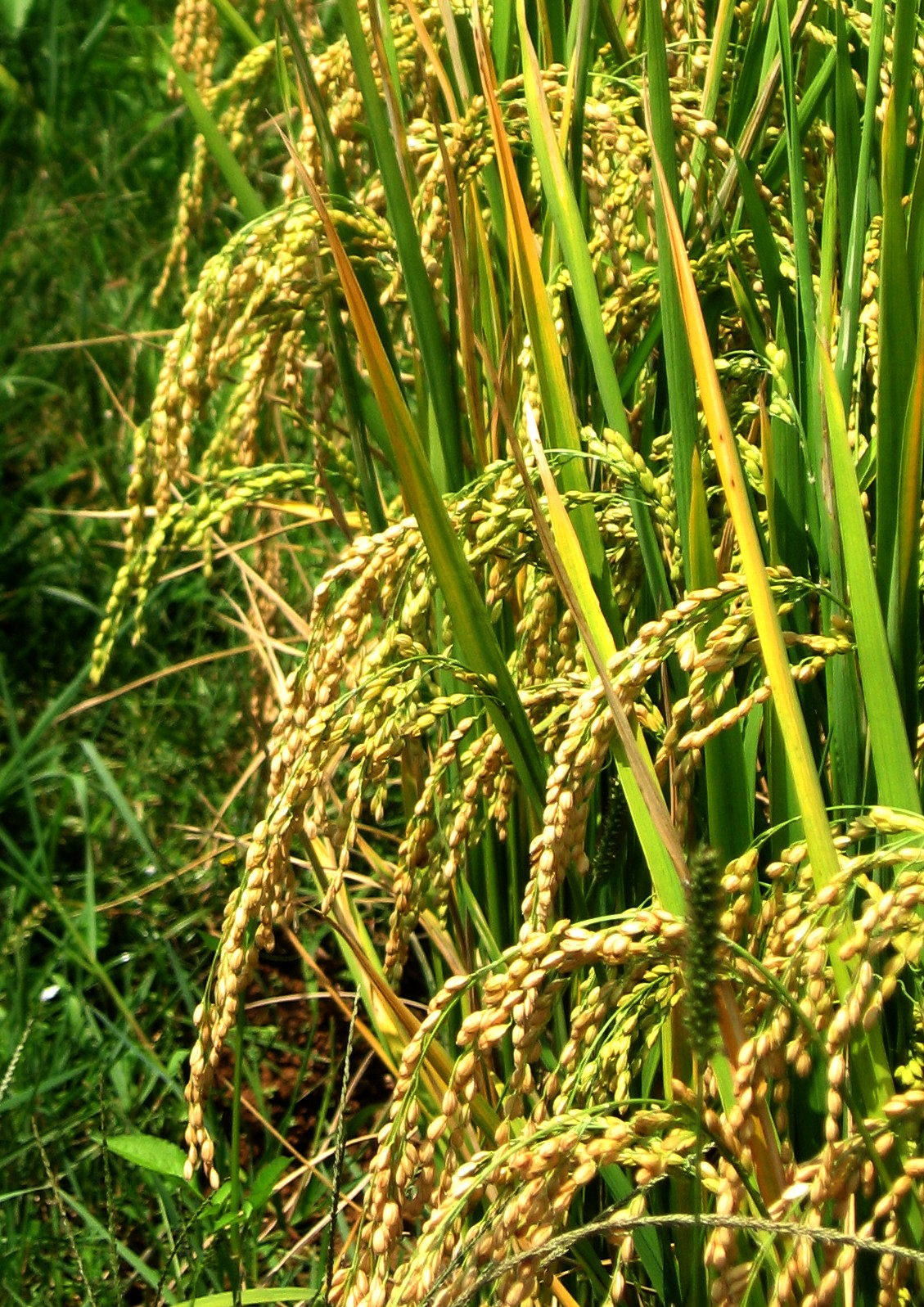
Rice

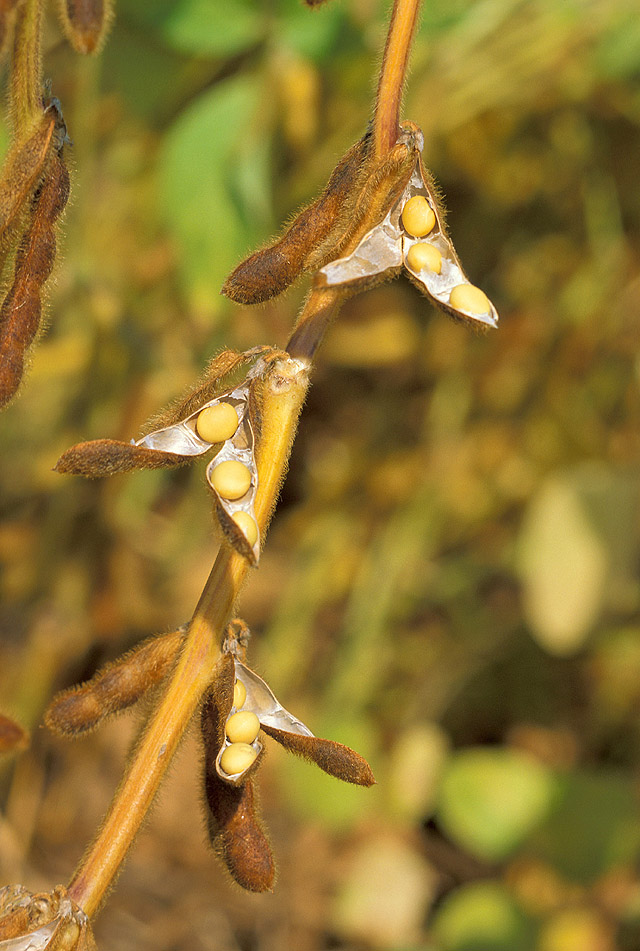
Soybeans

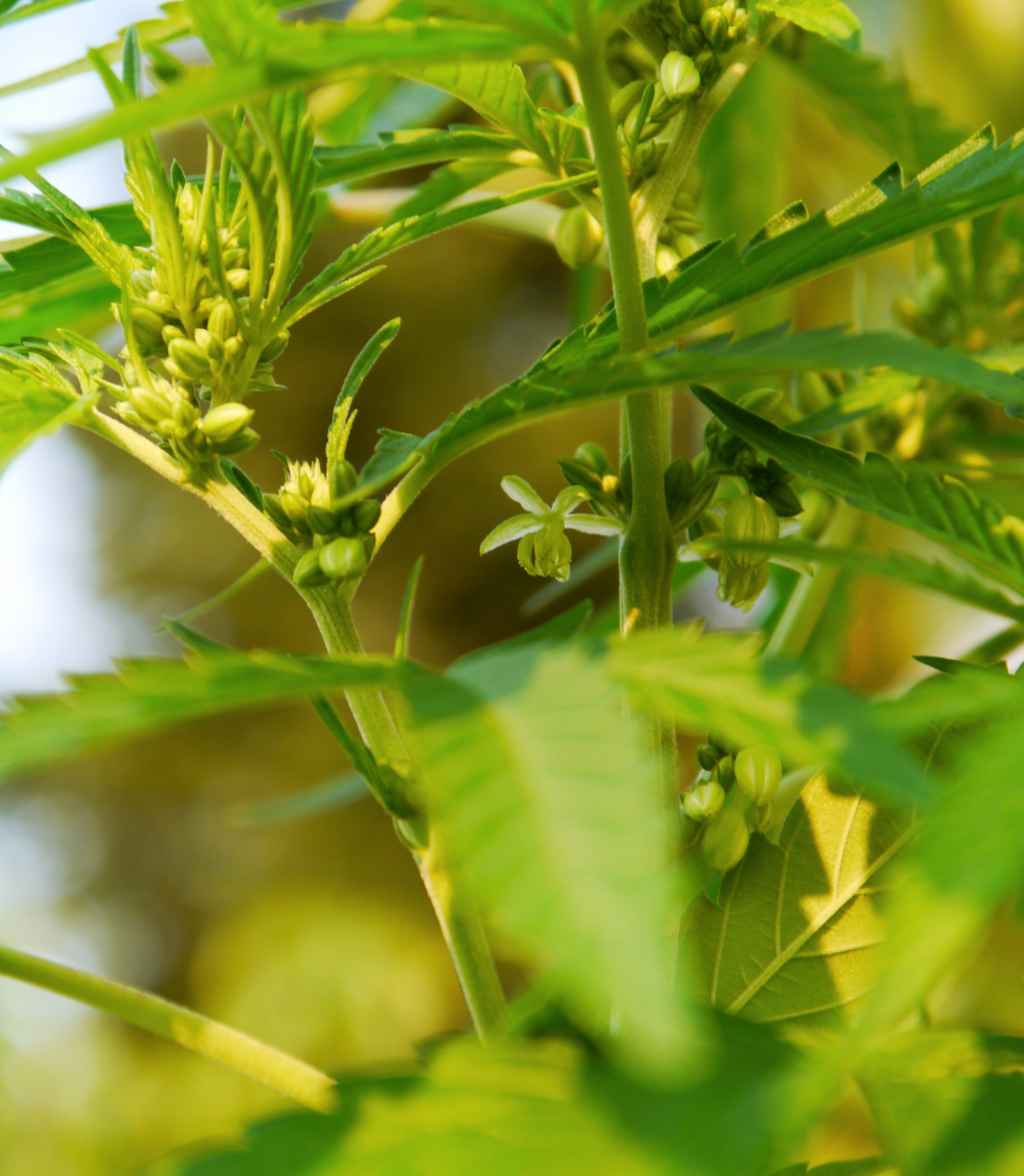
Hemp

== See also ==
- Agriculture in China
- Agriculture in Chinese mythology
