= Bovidae in Chinese mythology =

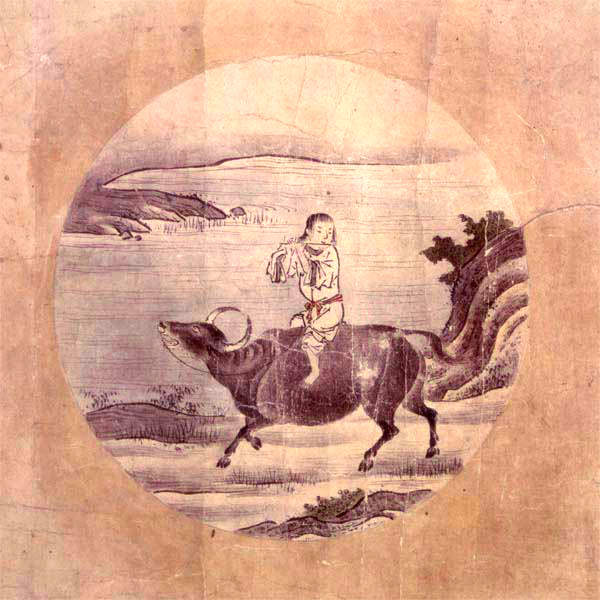
Number six of a series of ten images, generally known in English as the Ox-herding (or Bull-herding) pictures, by the 15th century Japanese Rinzai Zen monk Tenshō Shūbun. They are said to be copies of originals, now lost, traditionally attributed to Kuòān Shīyuǎn [廓庵師遠], or Kakuan Shien), a 12th-century Chinese Chan Buddhist (Zen) Master.

Bovidae in Chinese mythology include various myths and legends about a group of biologically distinct animals which form important motifs within Chinese mythology. There are many myths about the animals modernly classified as Bovidae, referring to oxen, sheep, goats, and mythological types such as "unicorns" (though perhaps not Bovidae, in the strict scientific sense). Chinese mythology refers to those myths found in the historical geographic area of China, a geographic area which has evolved or changed somewhat through history. Thus this includes myths in Chinese and other languages, as transmitted by Han Chinese as well as other ethnic groups (of which fifty-six are officially recognized by the current administration of China, according to Lihui Yang, 2005:4). There are various motifs of animals of the Bovidae biological family in Chinese mythology. These have often served as allusions in poetry and other literature. Some species are also used in the traditional Chinese calendar and time-keeping system.

== Biological taxonomy ==
The family Bovidae are a diverse group, classified as being part of the ungulates within Mammalia: they are the biological family of cloven-hoofed, ruminant mammals. All bovids have the similar basic form - a snout with a blunt end, a pair of horns (generally present on males) immediately after the oval or pointed ears, a distinct neck and limbs, and a tail varying in length and bushiness among the species. The bovids show great variation in size and pelage colouration. Excepting some domesticated forms, all male bovids have horns, and in many species females too possess horns. The size and shape of the horns vary greatly, but the basic structure is always a pair of simple bony protrusions without branches, often having a spiral, twisted or fluted form, each covered in a permanent sheath of keratin. Most bovids bear 30 to 32 teeth. A number of subfamilies are recognized, into which are grouped some 143 extant species and 300 extinct species (including extinct megafauna). Distribution of their ranges has varied considerably over the millennia, due to various factors, especially human factors and those related to climate change. Several species have been domesticated, and used for food, pulling loads, hides, wool, brush hair, and other purposes, including medicinal. Some Bovidae have historically been herded across the plains of Eurasia, by various nomadic groups of people.

The exact taxonomy of Bovidae subfamilies and the placement of species within them is not at least yet an exact science, and there is a lack of scientific consensus in some cases, and some reclassification due to further research distinctly possible. However, all Bovidae are "even-toed" ungulates, a taxonomic group which besides Bovidae also includes deer (cervidae), camels, and pigs. (The "odd-toed" ungulates include horses and rhinoceroses).

=== Bovinae ===
The biological subfamily Bovinae includes a diverse group of genera of medium to large-sized ungulates, of which those found in China historically include domestic cattle of the genus Bos (with Bos taurus predominating in the north of China), the water buffalo (genus Bubalus, mostly in the south), the yak (mostly in west, in the Himalayan mountains and other elevated terrain), and various antelopes (some now extinct). The taxonomy of the members of the group is somewhat uncertain, and they may be classified into loose tribes rather than formal subgroups. However, general characteristics include cloven hoofs and that most species have true horns, at least in the case of males. The largest extant bovine is the gaur, now found only in the extreme southern fringes of China.

=== Caprinae ===
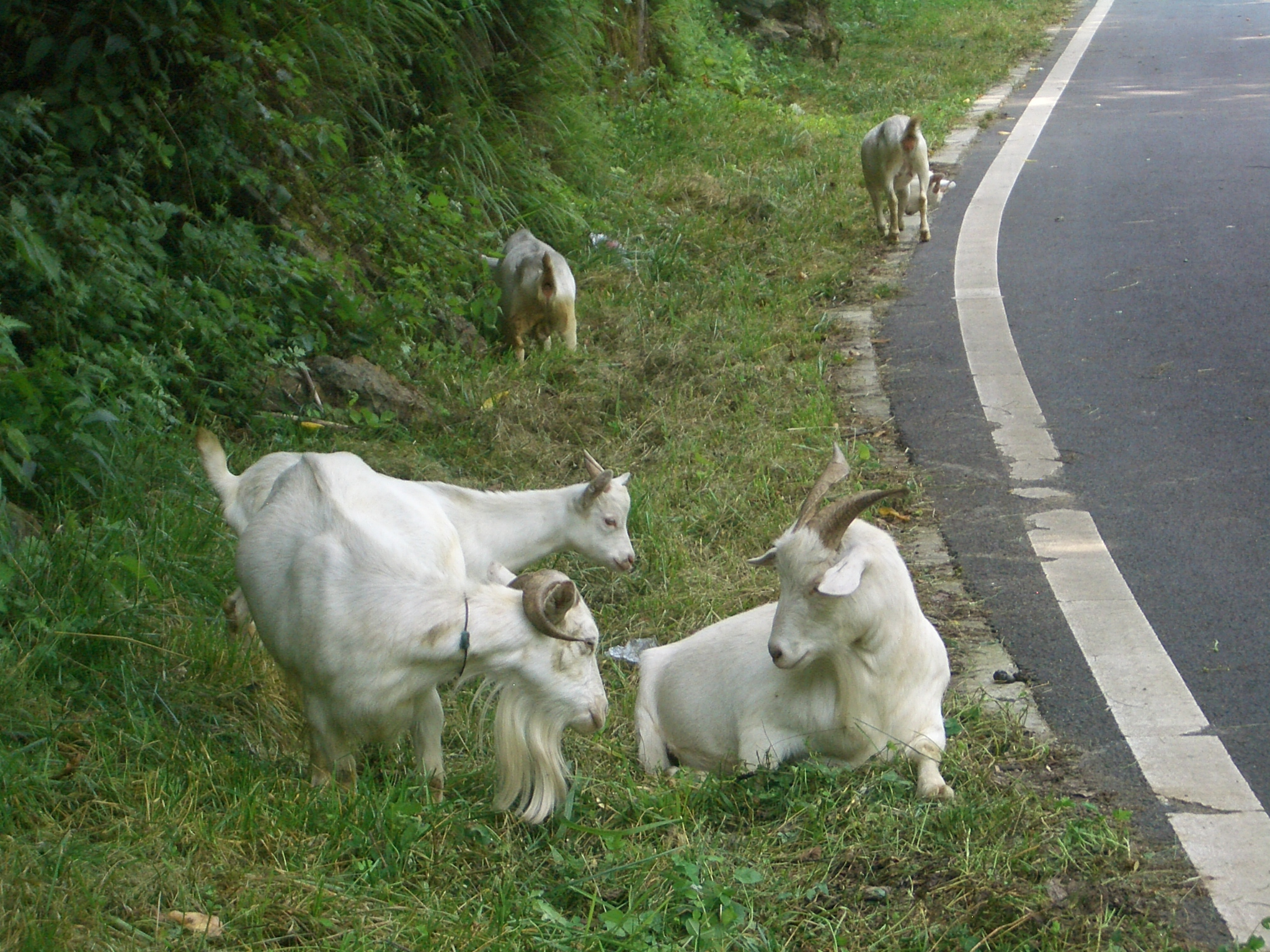
VM 5234 Shennongjia - goats south of Muyu, Hubei, China

The subfamily Caprinae are ruminants, consisting of mostly medium-sized bovids. its members also are known as caprids. The domestic sheep and goats have both been well known in China. Other Caprinae known in China are types called "antelopes", or "goat-antelopes" since they are not true antelopes (a true antelope is a bovid with a cervid-like or antilocaprid-like morphology). Most goat-antelopes are gregarious and have fairly stocky builds. The lifestyles of caprids fall into two broad classes: 'resource-defenders', which are territorial and defend a small, food-rich area against other members of the same species; and 'grazers', which gather together into herds and roam freely over a larger, usually relatively infertile area. Species in the area of China include the urial (Ovis orientalis) which occupies a largely infertile area from Kashmir to Iran, including much desert country characteristic of the historic Western Regions. The European mouflon (Ovis musimon) is thought to be the ancestor of the modern domestic sheep (Ovis aries), and was historically herded by the Xiong Nu, and other population groups located in or near China. The domestic goat (Capra aegagrus hircus) is a subspecies of goat domesticated from the wild goat of southwest Asia and Eastern Europe. Another species historically found wild in parts of China include the serow and the goral.

=== Antilopinae and others ===
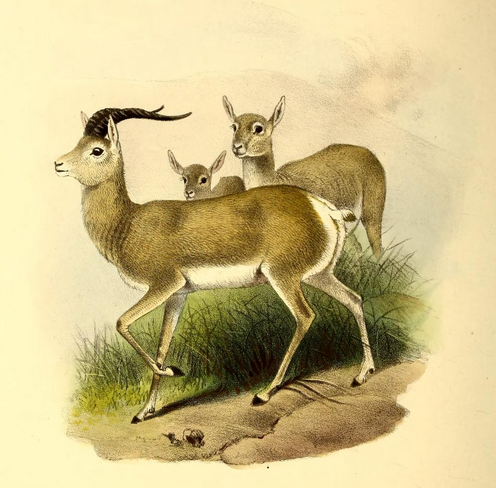
Gazella picticaudata, from The Book of Antelopes (1894)

This group includes various miscellaneous species, including gazelles. Species which have historically ranged in parts of China include 3 extant species of the genus Procapra: the Mongolian gazelle (Procapra gutturosa), the Tibetan Gazelle ((Procapra picticaudata), also known as the Goa), and the Przewalski's gazelle (Procapra przewalskii).

== Cattle ==
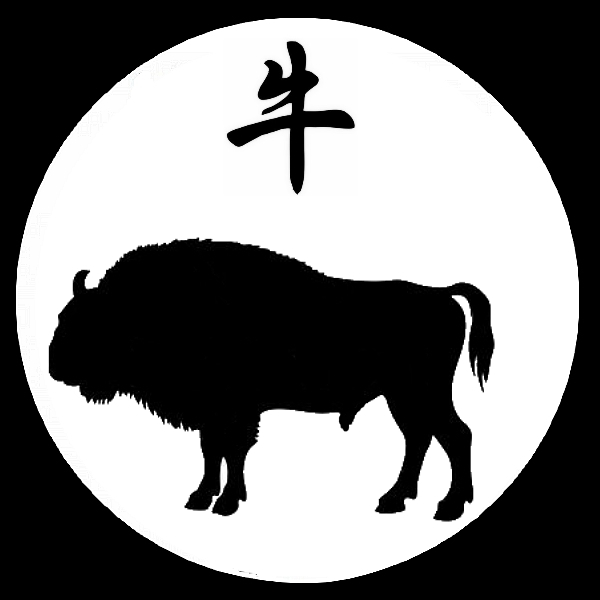
Picture of European bison-like bovid, in silhouette. Above is the Chinese character for "ox" ("cow", "buffalo", and so on).

One type of bovid is the bovine, or subfamily Bovinae, more commonly known as "oxen", "cows", "beef cattle", "calves", "buffalo". There are many Chinese myths about the oxen or ox-like beings, including both celestial and earthly varieties. The myths range from ones which include oxen or composite beings with cow characteristics as major actors to ones which focus on human or divine actors, in which the role of the cattle are more subsidiary. In some cases, Chinese myths focus on oxen-related subjects, such as plowing and agriculture or ox-powered carriage. Other myths focus on the power and temper of bulls, like the Bull Demon King and Ox-head. Another important historical role for beef has been in the religious capacity of sacrificial offerings.

== Sheep and goats ==
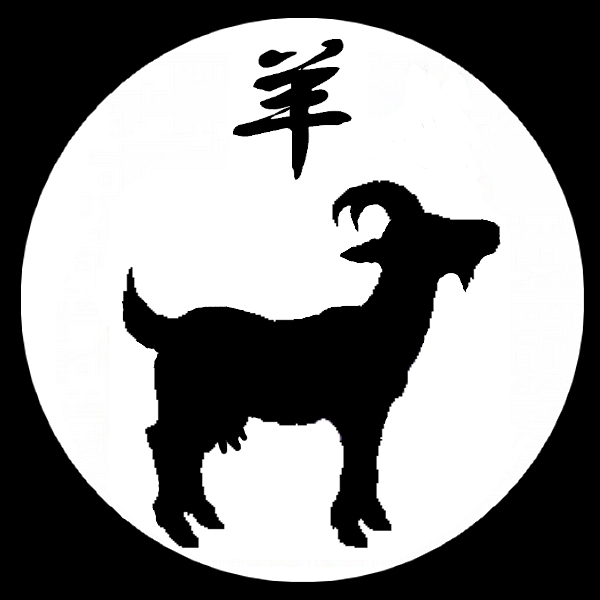
A zodiacal goat, with the Chinese character yang, meaning "goat" ("sheep" and so on).

Sheep and goats are not necessarily traditionally distinguished, in Chinese languages, with one word serving to denominate both. In ancient history, sheep arrived before goats.

Goats/Sheep are the eighth animal of the Chinese zodiac, and a symbol of filial piety, as the lambs are thought to kneel while their mothers suckle them (Eberhard: 264, sub "Sheep").

== Mythological types ==
Some mythological Bovidae in Chinese mythology are incapable of any pretence at scientific classification. Some of these are translated as "unicorns", in English. Some of the mythological types may represent extinct or exotic species, others seem completely mythological (Parker: passim). Some of the mythological types are chimeras, or composite type beasts, composed of parts from various animals, combined to form something different than found in nature.

== Qilin ==
Many translations from Chinese into English involve the translation of the Chinese qilin as "unicorn". However, the "Chinese unicorn" is more of a type of deer, than it is a type of horse. Taxonomically, the qilin would appear to be a one-horned ungulate; although, without information on whether the qilin, or lin, had, for example, an odd or even number of toes, the classification, in this regard, may remain moot, from a modern biological perspective. Nevertheless, and contextually, the Chinese characters used in sources strongly suggest that the "Chinese unicorn" was considered to be a type of bovid or cervid (deer family), rather than a horse (equid).

== See also ==
- List of Chinese terrestrial ungulates
- Mammals of China

== Works cited ==
- Eberhard, Wolfram (2003 [1986 (German version 1983)]), A Dictionary of Chinese Symbols: Hidden Symbols in Chinese Life and Thought. London, New York: Routledge. ISBN 0-415-00228-1
- Parker, Jeannie Thomas (2013). The Mythic Chinese Unicorn. Victoria, BC, Canada: FriesenPress. ISBN 9781460224076
- Yang, Lihui, et al. (2005). Handbook of Chinese Mythology. New York: Oxford University Press. ISBN 978-0-19-533263-6
