= Chi (mythology) =

Chinese dragon

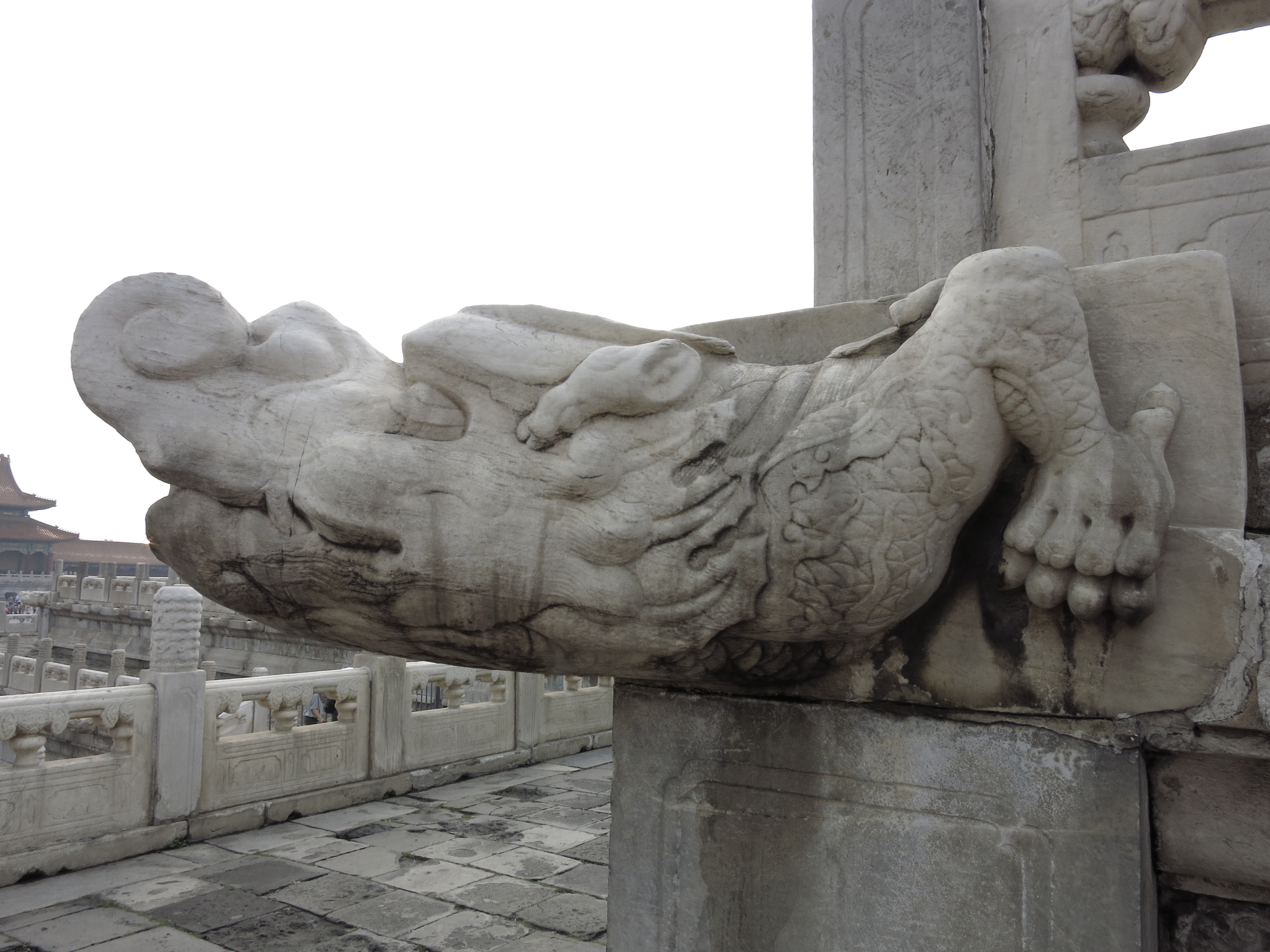
Head of chi ("hornless dragon"). Forbidden City, Hall of Supreme Harmony. Santai County marble. Showing use as an architectural element.

Chi (Chinese: 螭; pinyin: chī; Wade–Giles: ch'ih) means either "a hornless dragon" or "a mountain demon" (namely, 螭魅; chīmèi) in Chinese mythology. Hornless dragons were a common motif in ancient Chinese art, and the 螭吻; chiwen; 'hornless-dragon mouth' was an imperial roof decoration in traditional Chinese architecture.

== Word ==
In Modern Standard Chinese usage, 螭; chī; 'hornless dragon' occurs in words such as:

- 螭龍; chīlóng; 'hornless dragon + dragon'—"hornless dragon"; i.e. making it clear that a dragon and not a demon is being talked about.
- 螭紐; chīniǔ; 'hornless dragon + handle'—"carved dragon handle (esp. on cups)"
- 螭吻; chīwěn; 'hornless dragon + mouth'—"a roof ornament shaped like a dragon". Compare the homophonous variant 鴟吻; 'owl/hawk+mouth'.
- 螭首; chīshǒu; 'hornless dragon + head' or 螭頭; chītóu; 'hornless dragon + head'—"an architectural adornment; gargoyle"
- 蟠螭文; pánchīwén; 'coiled + hornless dragon + pattern'—"carved patterns of sinuous dragons (esp. on pillars/bronzes)"
- 螭陛; chībì; 'hornless dragon + throne'—"steps of the imperial palace; the Emperor"

=== Characters ===
Ancient seal script for 螭; chī; "a dragon; a demon"

The Chinese character for 螭; chī; 'hornless dragon', combines the "bug radical" 虫 (Kangxi radical #142)—typically used in words for insects, reptiles, and dragons (Note: See shen 蜃 as an example)—with a phonetic symbol, (离; 'mountain demon', 'leave'). This phonetic element 离 is pronounced either chī when used for 螭 "demon; dragon" or lí when used for 離; 'leave', 'part'. (Note: 離; Lí uses the "bird radical" 隹 combined with the phonetic element 离 to form the full word.) The c. 3rd century BCE seal script character for 螭, which is the earliest known writing, has the same radical-phonetic combination.

This 螭; chī; "hornless dragon" is also a variant Chinese character for 魑; chī (differentiated with the "ghost radical" 鬼) "mountain demon", which only occurs in the compound 魑魅; chīmèi; "mountain and forest demons; evil spirits; goblins". 魑魅; Chīmèi is sometimes written 螭魅 or 螭鬽 with 螭; chi. Note the "ghost radical" in the mei characters 魅 (with a phonetic of 未; wei) and 鬽 (with the "hair radical" 彡 representing the demon's hair, cf. 螭; chī variant 彲).

The Shuowen Jiezi (121 CE), which was the first Chinese dictionary of characters, gives 离, 螭; chī, and 魑 definitions.

- 离; chī: 山神獸也从禽頭从厹从屮。; "A mountain spirit and wild beast, [the pictograph] comes from its birdlike head, legs, and tail."
- 螭; chī: 若龍而黃北方謂之地螻从虫离聲或云無角曰螭。; "[A creature] like a dragon and yellow, in the north, they call it dìlóu, [the pictograph] comes from the "bug radical" and a chi 离 phonetic, or, a hornless [dragon] is called chi."
- 魑; chī: 鬼屬从鬼从离离亦聲。; "A kind of ghost/demon, [the ideograph] comes from the "ghost radical" and 离; chi; "mountain demon radical", which is also the phonetic."

This "earth cricket" (地螻; dìlóu) compares with tǔlóu (土螻; "earth cricket"), which the Classic of Mountains and Seas mentions in 昆侖邱; "Kunlun Mound", "There is an animal here [at the Mound of Offspringline] which looks like a ram, but has four horns. Its name is the earth-cricket. It devours humans."

=== Etymologies ===
The etymology of chi "dragon; demon" is obscure. Carr reviews three proposals by Peter A. Boodberg, Paul K. Benedict, and James Matisoff.

Boodberg proposed that chi 螭 or 魑 etymologically descends from a Sino-Tibetan root *brong-bri "wild oxen", from *brong "wild bull" and *bri or *brien "wild cow". He described this root as a "semantic atom, a referential complex with the meaning of 'wild' → 'wild animal' → 'couple'", and applied this etymon to many male and female animal couples, including *ly^{w}ung < *bl^{w}ong 龍; "male dragon" and *t'ia 魑; "female dragon". Compare how Yin and Yang cosmology dichotomized rainbow-dragons between Yang/male hóng (虹; "primary rainbow") and Yin/female ní (蜺; "secondary rainbow"). Benedict noted how Karlgren inconsistently reconstructed Old Chinese *t'lia for 离; chī; "a mountain demon", 魑; "a kind of demon", and 螭; "a kind of dragon; a demon"; but *lia for all the other words in this phonetic series (e.g., 漓; lí; "drip", 縭; lí; "ornamental scarf"). Benedict reconstructed Old Chinese *xlia 魑 "a mountain demon", deriving from a Proto-Tibeto-Burman *sri(-n) "demon" root, also evident in Tibetan sri "a species of devil or demon; a vampire", srin-po "demons", and Lushai hri < *sri "the spirit believed to cause sickness". He additionally hypothesized the *xlia 离 phonetic was cognate with shen < *[ly]yěn 神 "spirit; god" from Proto-Tibeto-Burman *[s-l]-rin < *[s-]rin.

Matisoff analyzes Benedict's *sri(-n) "demon" root as *s-r-i-n, and links Chinese *xlia 魑 with another Tibetan cognate hdre-srin "goblins and demons" (from hdre "goblin; demon; evil spirit").

Schuessler reconstructed Old Chinese *rhai for chī 离, 魑, and 螭 "mountain demon", and proposed a Sino-Tibetan etymology comparable with Tibetan ’dre < ɴdre "goblin; demon, evil spirit" and gre-bo "species of demon", Tangkhul rai "unclean spirit", Bodo ráj "devil", and possibly Proto-Kam–Sui la:l "devil; ghost" borrowed from Chinese.

== Meanings ==
Chinese classic texts use chī (螭) to mean both "a hornless dragon" and "a mountain demon". The following discussion focuses upon earliest recorded usages in pre-Han texts, some of which have uncertain dates of compilation.

=== Hornless dragon ===
The Lüshi Chunqiu (c. 239 BCE) quotes Confucius comparing lóng (龍; "dragons"), chī (螭; "hornless dragons"), and yú (魚; "fish").

The dragon eats and swims in clear water; the one-footed dragon eats in clean water but swims in muddy water; fish eat and swim in muddy water. Now, I have not ascended to the level of a dragon but I have not descended to that of fish. I am perhaps a one-footed dragon!

The reason for translating "one-footed dragon" is unclear. Compare the legendary Kuí (夔; "a one-footed dragon").

The Chuci (c. 2nd century CE) uses chī (螭) five times, which is more than any other Chinese classic. Two contexts mention xuanchi (玄螭; "dark/black hornless-dragon"); "They lined water monsters up to join them in the dance"; and "Driving black dragons, I travel northwards." Another mentions qīngqiú (青虯; "green horned-dragons") and báichī (白螭; "white hornless-dragons"); "With a team of azure dragons, white serpents in the traces." Two final contexts mention chī (螭) with lóng (龍; "dragons"); one describes a team of four dragons: "I ride a water chariot with a canopy of lotus; Two dragons draw it, between two water-serpents"; the other uses the compound chilóng (螭龍; "hornless dragon"): "And water dragons swim side by side, swiftly darting above and below."

The Huainanzi (c. 139 BCE) chapter "Peering into the Obscure" (覽冥訓) mentions chìchī (赤螭; 'red hornless-dragon') and báichī (白螭; 'white hornless-dragon'). The former occurs with qīngqiú (青虯; 'green horned-dragon'): "When the red hornless dragon and the green horned dragon roamed the land of Chi 冀, the sky was limpid and the earth undisturbed." The latter occurs with bēnshé (奔蛇; 'fast snake'): the chariot of Fu Xi and Nüwa was "preceded by white serpents and followed by speeding snakes."

The "Records of the Grand Historian" (c. 100 BCE) biography of Sima Xiangru includes two of his fu 賦 poems that mention chìchī (赤螭; "red hornless dragons"). "The Shanglin Park" 上林賦 mentions them with jiāolóng (蛟龍), "Here horned dragons and red hornless dragons"; "Sir Fantasy" 子虛賦 mentions them with qīngqiú (青虯; "red hornless dragons and green horned dragons")

Theses texts describe black, white, and red chī (螭; "hornless dragons"), which contradicts the Shuowen Jiezi "like a dragon and yellow" definition. However, a possible explanation might be found in the Hanshu (揚雄傳) commentary of Wei Zhao, which describes the chī (螭) demon as "resembling a tiger with scales".

Many later dictionaries—for instance, the Guangya (c. 230 CE), Longkan Shoujian (997 CE), and Piya (c. 1080 CE)—define a contrast between qiu (虯; "horned dragon") and chi (螭; "hornless dragon"). De Groot provides a picture of a sepulchral stone tablet decorated with a chi and the Gujin Tushu Jicheng illustration of this hornless dragon.

=== Mountain demon ===
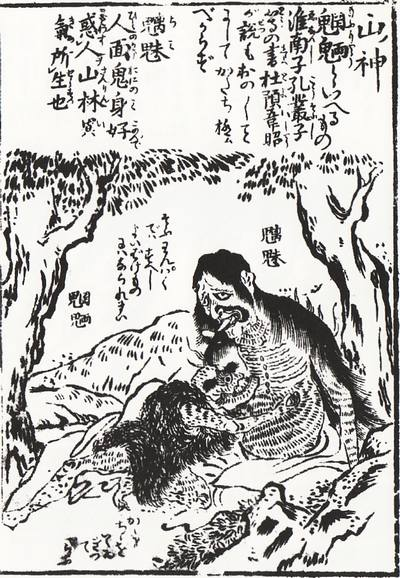
Chimi-mōryō (魑魅魍魎) illustration from the 1802 CE Japanese Hyakkiyako-Bakemonogatari 百鬼夜講化物語

The variant 魑; chī used in chīmèi (魑魅; "demon; evil spirit") only occurs as a bound morpheme in chīmèi, but mèi (魅; 'spirit')) occurs in other expressions such as mèilì (魅力; 'mèi+ power'; "enchantment; fascination; charm"). Both modern Chinese and Japanese normally use "ghost radical" 鬼 characters to write chīmèi (魑魅) and wǎngliǎng or mōryō (魍魎), but these were not regularly used in classical texts. The Hanshu (111 CE) first wrote chīmèi as 魑魅, but earlier texts like Zuozhuan and Shiji wrote it as 螭魅, with the "hornless dragon" variant. The Guoyu (c. 4th century BCE) first wrote wǎngliǎng as 魍魎, but more classics like the Shuoyuan, Zhuangzi, Huainanzi, and Chuci) phonetically wrote it as 罔兩, without the ghost radical.

Chīmèi 螭魅 is joined with wǎngliǎng in the expression chīmèi-wǎngliǎng (魑魅魍魎; "demons and monsters; evil spirits"). Since some commentators differentiate between chīmèi "demons of the mountains and forests" and wǎngliǎng "demons of the rivers and marshes", chīmèi-wǎngliǎng can mean either "'demons, monsters' generally or 'mountain and water demons' separately". De Groot describes chimei as "another demon-tribe" because the "Chinese place in their great class of hill-spirits certain quadrumana, besides actual human beings, mountaineers alien to Chinese culture, perhaps a dying race of aborigines."

The Zuozhuan (c. 389 BCE) commentary to the Chunqiu has the earliest textual usages of both chīmèi (螭魅) and chīmèi-wangliang (螭魅罔兩).

Both the chīmèi contexts concern banishing evildoers into dangerous wilderness regions. The former (文公18;) refers to the 四凶; Sixiong; 'Four Perils' (渾敦; Hundun, 窮奇; Qiongqi, 檮杌; Taowu, and 饕餮; Taotie); the legendary ruler Shun, "banished these four wicked ones, Chaos, Monster, Block, and Glutton, casting them out into the four distant regions, to meet the spite of the sprites and evil things". Du Yu's commentary glosses chīmèi as "born in the strange qi of mountains and forests, harmful to humans". The latter context only mentions the villainous Taowu: "The ancient kings located T'aou-wuh in [one of] the four distant regions, to encounter the sprites and other evil things."

The chīmèi-wǎngliǎng (螭魅罔兩) context records how Yu the Great, legendary founder of the Xia dynasty, cast nine instructional bronze ding "tripod cauldrons" to acquaint people with all the dangerous creatures in China's Nine Provinces.

Anciently, when Hea was distinguished for its virtue, the distant regions sent pictures of the [remarkable] objects in them. The nine pastors sent in the metal of their provinces, and the tripods were cast, with representations on them of those objects. All the objects were represented, and [instructions were given] of the preparations to be made in reference to them, so that the people might know the sprites and evil things. Thus the people, when they went among the rivers, marshes, hills, and forests, did not meet with the injurious things, and the hill-sprites, monstrous things, and water-sprites, did not meet with them [to do them injury].

Note how Legge translates each chīmèi-wǎngliǎng syllable individually: chīmèi "injurious things, and the hill-sprites" and wǎngliǎng "monstrous things, and water-sprites".

Wang Chong's Lùnhéng (論衡) (late 1st century CE) considers the chīmèi as a dragon hybrid, "Those who give their opinion on the ch'i, state that they are dragon-like beings; therefore, as the word mei is copulated to (the name of) a dragon, the mei must be a congener of this animal."

== Mythic parallels ==
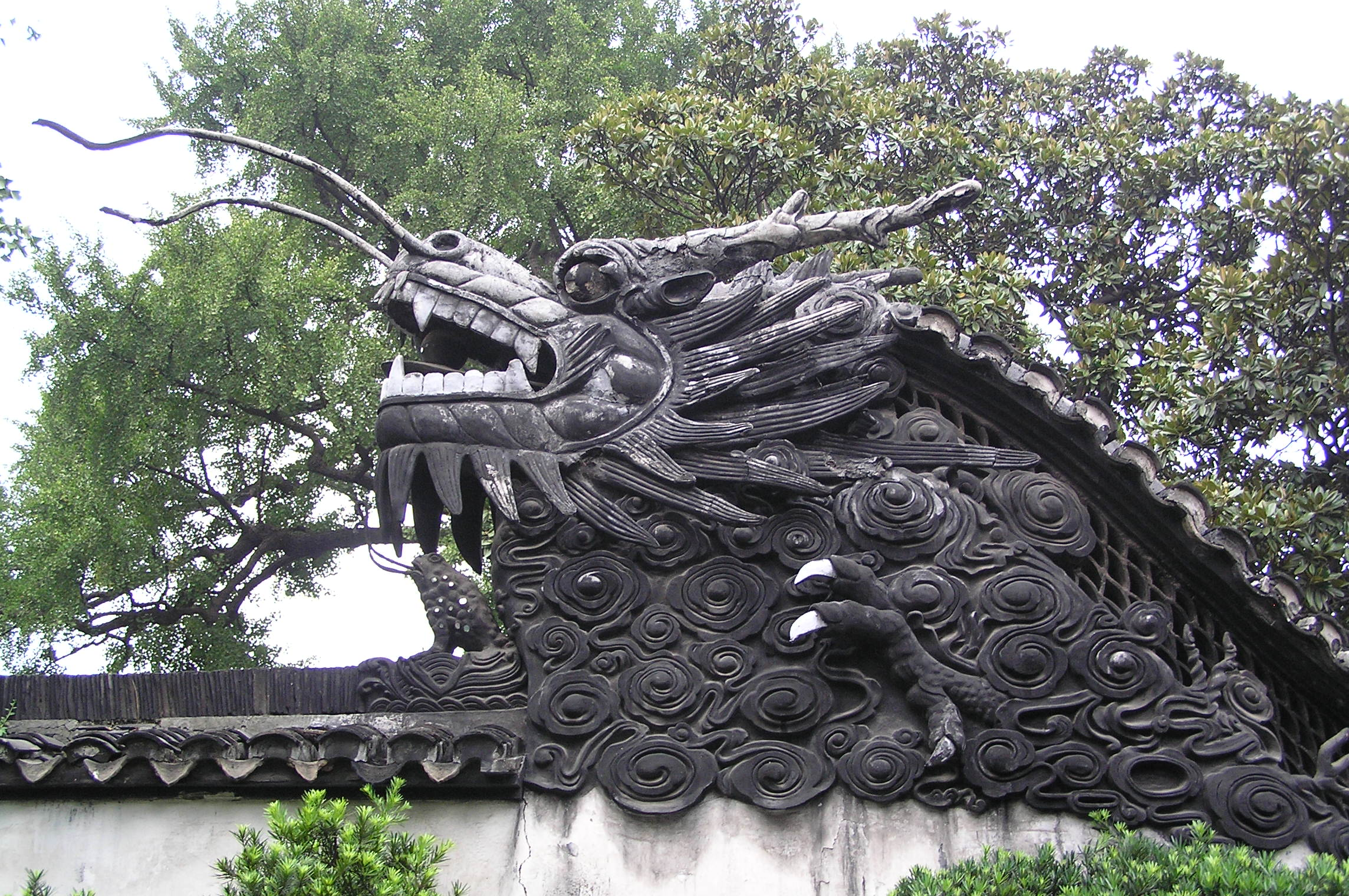
Horned dragon roof decoration in Yuyuan Garden, Shanghai

In Chinese folklore and art, most dragons, including the lóng (龍), are represented with two horns. Besides the chī (螭), only a few dragons supposedly lacked horns, for instance, jiaolong (蛟龍; "aquatic dragon; hornless dragon; crocodile") or qiulong (虯龍; "horned dragon; hornless dragon").

In comparative mythology as well, horned dragons are generally more common than hornless ones. Based upon the chīshŏu (螭首; "hornless-dragon head") roof adornment, Kroll translates chi as wyvern, "a footed winged dragon with a serpent's tail, becoming in medieval times an oft-pictured heraldic beast."
