= List of supernatural beings in Chinese folklore =

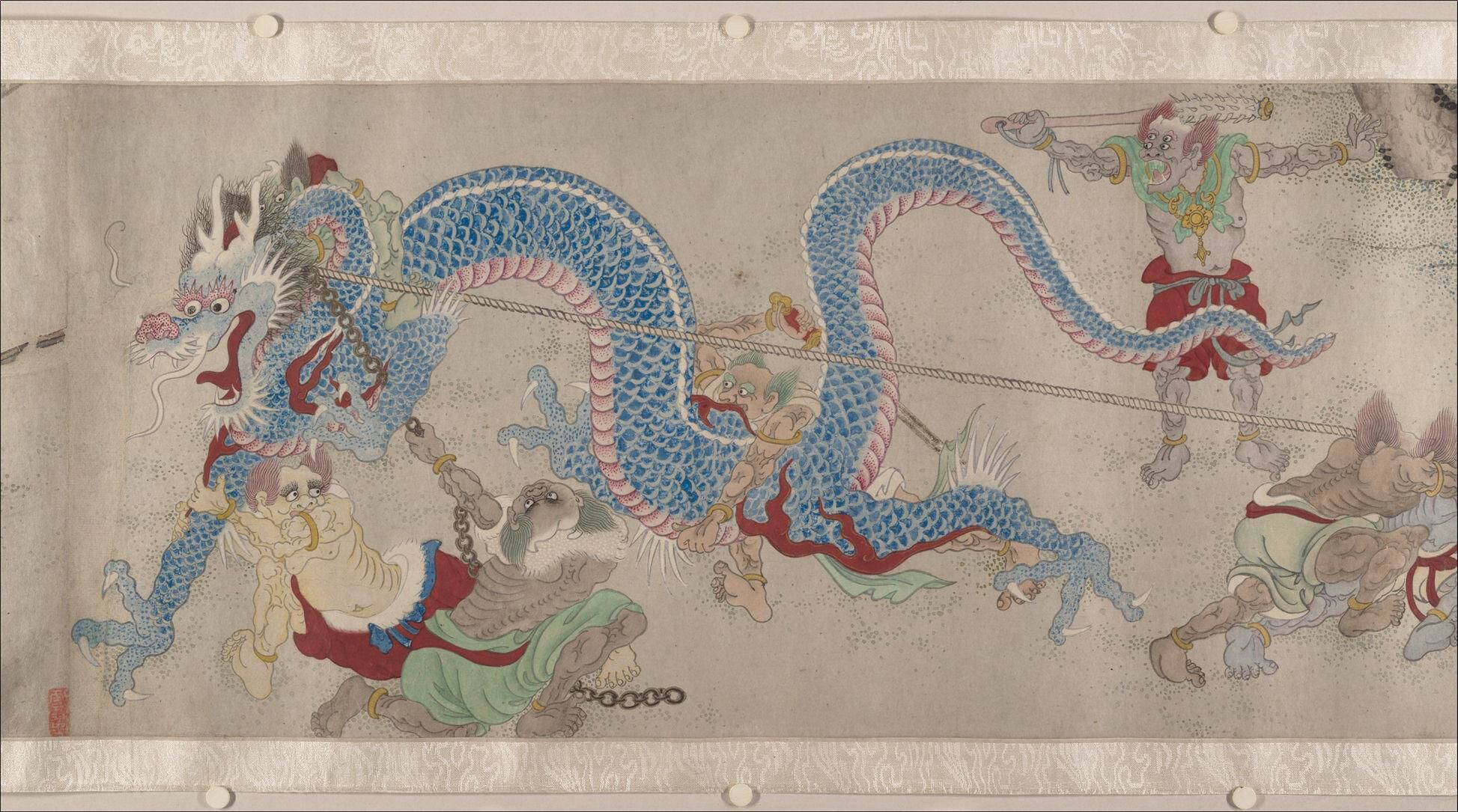
Erlang Shen's Heavenly Troops capturing a dragon, in one of the Searching the Mountains for Demons-paintings (zh:搜山图)

The following is a list of supernatural beings in Chinese folklore and fiction originating from traditional folk culture and contemporary literature.

The list includes creatures from ancient classics (such as the Discourses of the States, Classic of Mountains and Seas, and In Search of the Supernatural) literature from the Gods and Demons genre of fiction, (for example, the Journey to the West, and Investiture of the Gods), as well as works from the Records of the Strange genre (for example Pu Songling's Strange Stories from a Chinese Studio and What the Master Would Not Discuss).

This list contains supernatural beings who are inherently "evil" or that tend towards malevolence, such as ghosts and demons, hobgoblins and sprites, and even some ambivalent deities. It also includes uncanny or eerie entities that are not necessarily evil or harmful, but which evoke a sense of alienation.

== Aoyin (傲因) ==
The Aoyin (傲因) is a man-eating humanoid monster of the desolate Western regions, described as having a very long tongue, sharp claws, and wearing tattered clothes. This anthropophagous being has a taste for human brains. It may be slain by smashing a rock on its tongue. It is also known as the Mowei (獏㺔).

It is recorded in the Classic of Gods and Aberrations, in the chapter on creatures of the Southwestern Wastelands (神异经·西南荒经).

== Ba jiao gui (芭蕉鬼) ==
Ba jiao gui (Chinese: 芭蕉鬼; pinyin: bā jiāo guǐ; lit. 'banana ghost') is a female ghost that dwells in a banana tree and appears wailing under the tree at night, sometimes carrying a baby.

In some folktales from Thailand, Malaysia and Singapore, greedy people ask for lottery numbers from the ghost in the hope of winning money. They tie a red string around the tree trunk, stick sharp needles into the tree, and tie the other end of the string to their beds. At night, the ghost appears and begs the person to set her free. In return, she will give them a set of winning numbers. If the person does not fulfil his/her promise to set the ghost free after winning, they will meet with a horrible death. This ghost is similar in some aspects to the Pontianak/Kuntilanak in Malay and Indonesian folklore.

== Baigujing (白骨精) ==
Also known as Lady White Bone. A cunning, shapeshifting being that developed from the exposed skeleton of a maiden that had absorbed the energy of the sun and moon. In the novel the Journey to the West, she desires to consume the flesh of the travelling monk Tang San Zang in order to obtain immortality and assumes various guises in order to do so.

== Banyan Tree Spirits (榕树鬼) ==
From the perspective of feng shui, Banyan trees easily absorb yin energy, and thus readily shelter abominable spirits. These trees are ubiquitous in southern China.

== Black Wind Calamity (眚 黑) ==
A kind of demonic entity manifesting as a black fog or creatures within a black fog, leaving behind grievous and sometimes fatal injuries among the population wherever they went. The beings within the fog are variously dog-like or serpentine. Whenever these black winds struck, the emperor made petitions to heaven, issued decrees of repentance, and granted general pardons.

Creatures emerging from the black vapors are of diverse form. In Shunde and Hejian in Zhili, the area directly administered by the Emperor around Beijing, they appeared as creatures in between dogs and cats. In Hengyang, they appeared as nightmarish spectres that afflicted only women, so that blood streamed out of their mouths with fatal consequences. In Hangzhou, the black fog was followed by "serpentine beings, rolling in cartwheels, with eyes like lightning, and followed by frost and hail". In Shandong, one in the shape of a hairy black barrel came down from a willow tree and disappeared.

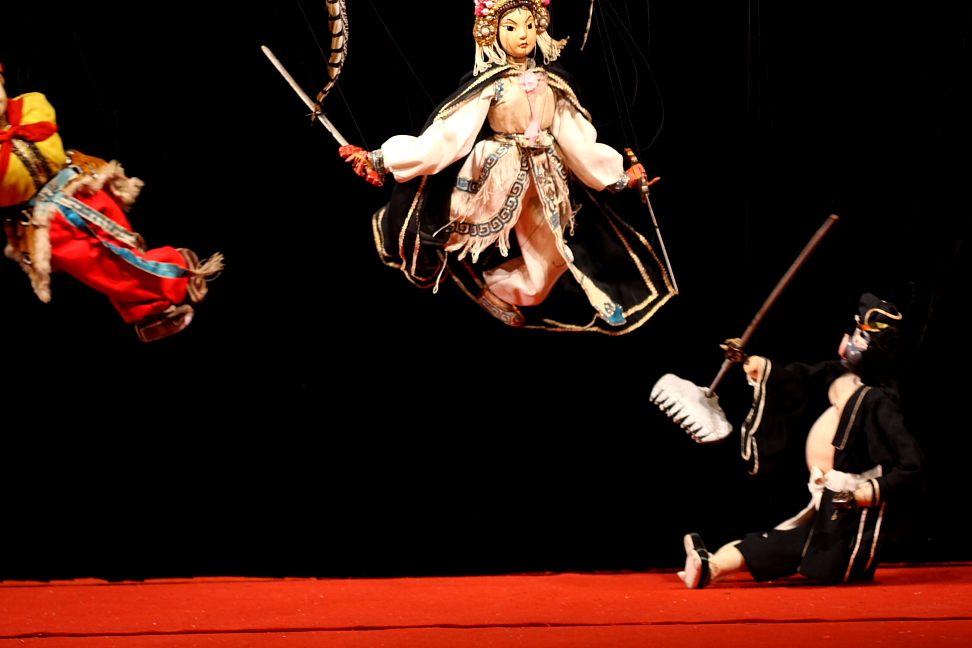
Lady White Bone battles Zhu Bajie and Sun Wukong in a puppet show

== Chimei (魑魅) ==
Chimei (魑魅) are wilderness demons. Sometimes regarded as demons of the mountains and forests that are born of aberrant or turbid qi or energy. The character "魅" suggests the supernatural power of enchantment or allurement. Often contrasted with wangliang (魍魎), who are demons of the marshes and rivers. The term chimeiwangliang (魑魅魍魎) means all kinds of demons, goblins and ghouls and is used as a metaphor for bad people in general.

One source describes a disease-causing mei 魅 assuming the form of a snake when killed.

Likely related to the one-horned dragon, or 螭, or a homonymous creature the 螭魅, which is a beast with a human head that likes to bewilder people.

== Dame Drowned Old-Lady (尊溺婆) ==
A specter in the oral traditions of Xiamen (Amoy) in Fujian province. A cloudy mass that suddenly appears to capsize and drown boats. The phenomenon is attributed to the spirit of a woman who, unable to bear her husband's abuse, committed suicide. This vengeful ghost seeks to drag her husband, a fisherman, down with her. Mock paper money is often burned to appease her whenever she appears.

== Daolaogui (刀劳鬼) ==
Documented in Chapter 12 of the text known as the Shoushenji (搜神記) written by Gan Bao (干寶). The Daolaogui (刀劳鬼) are said to generally found in damp and cold places in deep mountains of the Linchuan area of Jiangxi Province. The Daolaogui has a frightening appearance and can shoot a highly poisonous gas or dart from its mouth. The Daolaogui often appears accompanied by strong winds and heavy rain, possibly because they want to hide their voice, which sounds like a grown man roaring.

There are both male and female Daolaogui: the male is dark green, while the female is purple, and male Daolaogui are more toxic than female ones. If the victim is poisoned by the dart, they will swell up quickly, and die within a day. After dying, they will become a Daolaogui themselves unless their corpse is burned. However, the Daolaogui does not move very fast, so one may escape a Daolaogui encounter by holding one's breath and running away quickly. One may also survive partial poisonings by cutting off swollen areas within half a day.

== Di fu ling (地缚灵) ==
Dì fù líng (地缚灵; 地縛靈; 'Earth-bound spirit') refers to ghosts who are bound to certain locations on Earth, such as their place of burial or a place they had a strong attachment to when they were alive. They are highly circumscribed in their activities, unable to leave the area to which they are bound.

== Diao si gui (吊死鬼) ==
De Groot observes that "self-destruction in China is perpetrated usually by means of a rope", and the victims are usually said to become fearsome ghosts or "hanging-spectres". Diào sǐ guǐ (吊死鬼; 'hanged ghosts') are the ghosts of people who died from hanging due to various reasons (e.g. execution, suicide, accident). They are usually depicted with long red tongues sticking out of their mouths. They are also known as Diao gui (吊鬼). They are known to be capable of seducing others to suicide, or outright hanging others.

== Dog demons (狗妖) ==
Dog demons do not appear in Chinese folklore as "bloodthirsty demons", but rather "wickedly assume human shape, with the purpose of gratifying their lusts on modest maids and wives", as per De Groot.

== E gui (饿鬼) ==
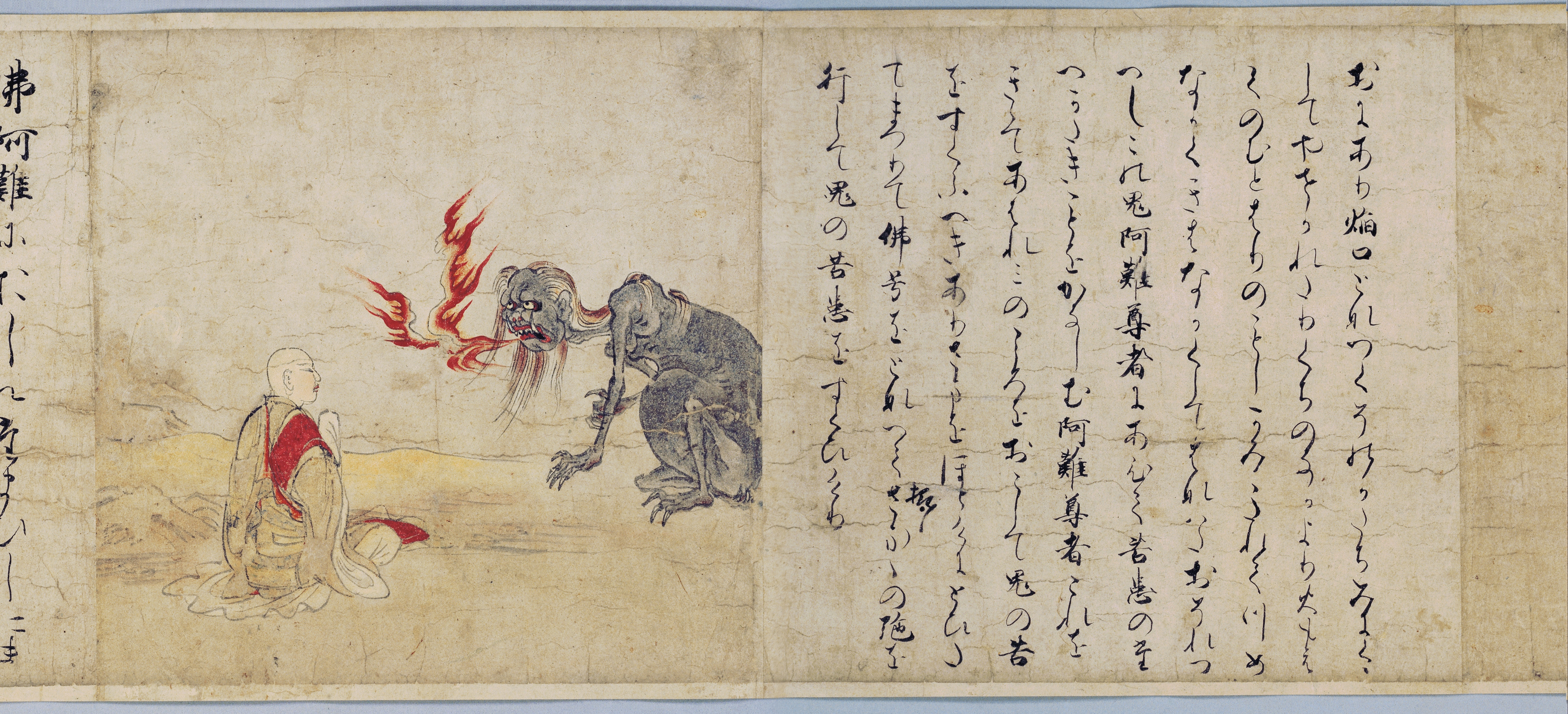
Hungry ghosts scroll, Kyoto

È guǐ (餓鬼; 饿鬼; 'hungry ghost') refers to ghosts driven by intense emotional needs in an animalistic way. They are the spirits of people who committed sins out of greed when they were alive and have been condemned to suffer in hunger after death.

The e gui is usually depicted as having green or grey skin, a mouth too small for ingesting food, and sometimes with a potbelly. The ghost suffers from insatiable hunger and roams the streets and kitchens in search of offerings and decomposed food. These hungry ghosts consume anything, including excreted waste and rotten flesh. Some have fire-breathing abilities while others suffer from anorexia. These appear during the Hungry Ghost Festival, observed by the Chinese diaspora in SE Asia and even in Japan, and when people avoid travelling during the night in order to avoid encountering something "unclean".

== Fang Liang (方良) ==
The Fang Liang (方良) are demonic, necrophagic creatures that break into tombs to consume the brains of the dead and which can be killed by twigs of the Arborvitae. It has an aspect that is like a cross between a pig and a sheep while being anthropomorphic enough to be represented by human statues. The Rites of Zhou describes the role Fang Xiang Shi, a kind of government-appointed ritual specialist as being to exorcise these creatures or drive them away. The brains of four-eyed variants known as Qi have medicinal value.

== Fen Yang (墳羊) ==
Literal meaning: "grave goat". A demon of the soil or the earth with a sheep-like aspect. A subterranean goat-like demon mentioned in the Guoyu (Discourses of the States) by Confucious. A sheep-like being of the earth, sometimes said to be born in wells. Usually regarded as necrophagous, invading tombs to eat corpses. De Groot claims that they were invoked to explain the process of decomposition, which could not be understood at the time.

Sometimes regarded as a demon with an undeveloped sexuality, and responsible for haunting houses and ruins, as well as afflicting children with epilepsy and inducing miscarriage.

"When water gives birth to water bugs or clams, or mountains give birth to gold and jade, people do not find it strange. But when mountains give birth to Xiaoyang (梟陽), water gives birth to Wangxiang (罔象), wood gives birth to Bifang (畢方), and wells give birth to Fenyang (墳羊), people find it strange."

== Gui po (鬼婆) ==
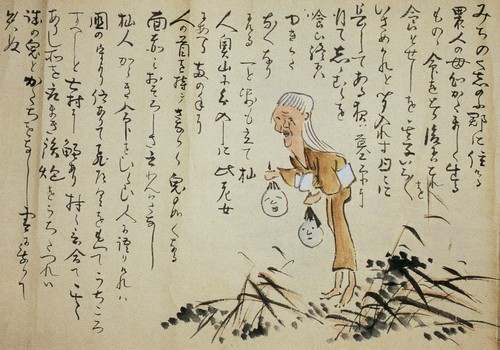
Bakemono Onibaba

A relatively modern belief, likely influenced by the "onibaba" of Japan, especially through the 1964 movie of the same name. The guǐ pó (鬼婆; 'old woman ghost') is a ghost that takes the form of a peaceful and friendly old woman. They may be the spirits of amahs who used to work as servants in rich families. They return to help their masters with housekeeping matters or take care of young children and babies. However, there are also evil gui pos with disgusting and violent appearances.

== Hanba (旱魃) ==
A drought-causing demon. De Groot observes that droughts have always vexed China and were often attributed to demons. The Shi Jing states that there are beings two to three feet in height, with eyes on top of their head, and that move as fast as the wind.

== Heibai Wuchang (黑白无常) ==
Literally: "Black and White Impermanence".

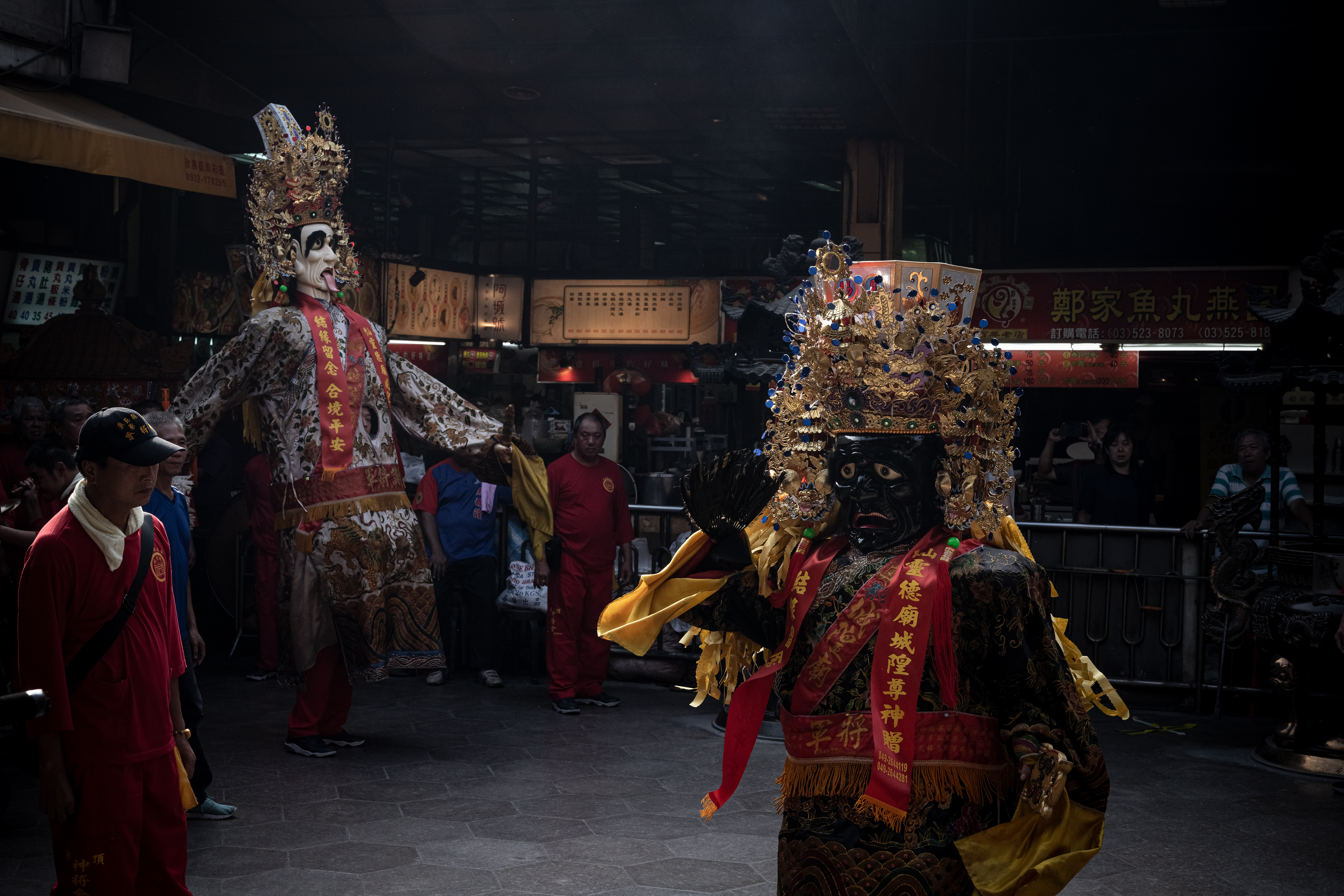
Heibai Wuchang

Two beings charged with escorting the spirits of the dead to the underworld, thus, playing the role of psychopomp in Taoist belief. Prominent in the folkloric beliefs of the people of Fujian and in the superstitions of the Chinese diaspora in SE Asia. In many accounts, the two, in their mortal lives, were a pair of yamen guards - Xie Bi'an (谢必安) and Fan Wujiu (范无咎). One of whom drowned and the other committed suicide. Their friendship impressed the Jade Emperor, who made them deities.

=== Xie Bi'An (谢必安), the White Impermanence (白无常) ===
The White Guard, 谢必安, is commonly portrayed as a fair complexioned man dressed in a white robe and wearing a tall hat bearing the Chinese words "Become Rich Upon Encountering Me" (simplified Chinese: 一見生財; traditional Chinese: 一見發財), "Become Lucky Upon Encountering Me" (一見大吉), or "You Have Come Too" (你也來了). He holds a hand fan in one hand and a fish-shaped shackle or wooden sign in the other hand. He is usually depicted as the taller of the duo.

=== Fan Wujiu (范无咎), the Black Impermanence (黑无常) ===
The Black Guard, 范无咎, is typically represented as a dark-complexioned man in a black robe and wearing a hat similar to the one worn by the White Guard. The Chinese words on his hat are "Peace to the World" (天下太平) or "Arresting You Right Now" (正在捉你). He holds a hand fan in one hand and a squarish wooden sign in the other hand. The sign bears the words "Making a Clear Distinction Between Good and Evil" (善惡分明) or "Rewarding the Good and Punishing the Evil" (獎善罰惡). A long chain is wrapped around one of his arms.

In popular culture, they often feature in Wuxia movies as disguises adopted by villains, and also feature as tropes in comic books.

== Huapigui (画皮鬼) ==
A man-eating demon that wears human skin to disguise its hideous countenance. The Huapigui first appeared in the painted skin record of the famous novel "Strange Tales from a Chinese Studio" in the Qing Dynasty. It is a ferocious ghost who eats humans and wear their victim's skin. Its initial appearance is green due to its rotten form, but it usually takes the form of a beautiful woman it killed. Huapigui means "Painted skin ghost".

== Hulijing (狐狸精) ==
A fox capable, through spiritual cultivation, of assuming human form, and of employing sorcery to poison, to bewilder, and to enthrall. Described as clairvoyant and capable of possessing humans. Said to be capable of transcending yin and yang. Often associated with sexual desire. It is capable of ascending to heaven and becoming a celestial fox after immense age. The popular imagination may have been fueled in part by the underground presence of suppressed or outlawed fox spirit cults and other heterodox forms of spirituality in the Song dynasty. These cults often held services in the secret backrooms of officially sanctioned temples.

De Groot describes them in the Chinese imagination as "the cause of insanity, disease and even death", "entering into men to change them into raving lunatics", a cause of matricide, uxoricide and even patricide, usually from a spirit of "unprovoked malignity". They are sufficiently cunning to sometimes adopt the guise of Buddhist saints. In their more humorous moods, they engage in minor tricks such as cutting off the hair of people.

== Hundun (浑沌) ==
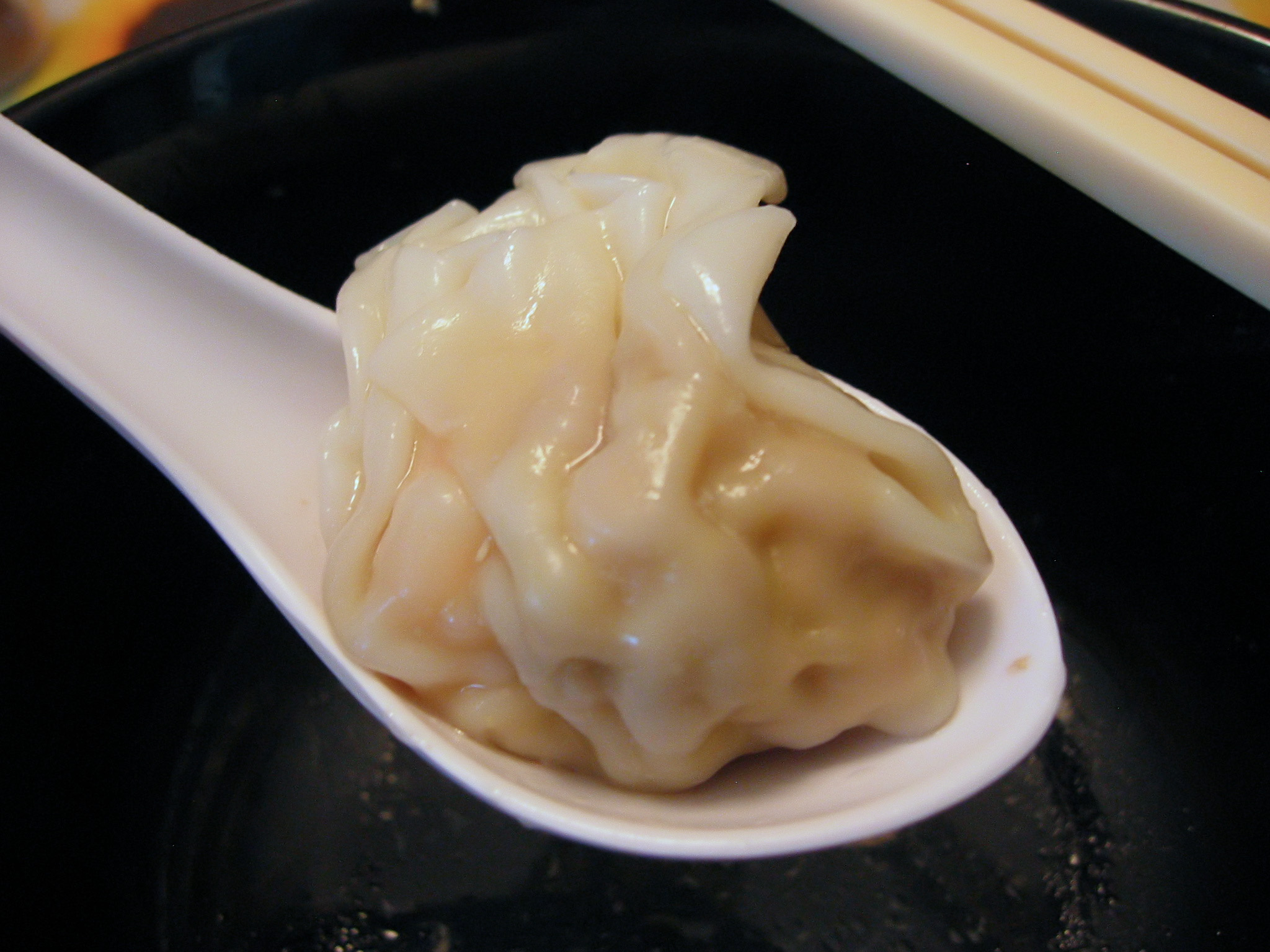
Huntun, a cognate of Hundun

A kind of river god of the Central Plains, also one of the four fiends of ancient China. Described as looking like a yellow sack without eyes or a face, and with six legs and four wings. Represents chaos, muddle-headedness and ignorance.

There is a linguistic connection between Hùndùn 浑沌 and húntun 餛飩 (wonton), and both share an amorphous sack-like appearance.

== Jian (聻) ==
jiàn (聻; chien) refers to the "ghost" of a ghost. Just as ghosts frighten men, ghosts of ghosts frighten ghosts. A story in volume 5 of Pu Songling's Strange Stories from a Chinese Studio contained the following line: "A person becomes a ghost after death, a ghost becomes a jian after death."

== Jiangshi (僵尸) ==
The jiāngshī (殭屍; 僵屍; chiang-shih; 'stiff corpse') is a ferocious, ravenous corpse reanimated by either natural energy, necromantic arts, or through freakish accident. They can also arise when the higher intellectual soul has left the body, but the lower animal soul remains behind. Characterized by great strength and hunger, they kill living beings to absorb their yang energy, or consume them whole, rather than by drinking blood. When they have acquired enough life force, they are capable of sorcery and flight.

De Groot describes them as follows: "they greatly occupy credulous and superstitious minds in Amoy [Xiamen, Fujian]... there and in the surrounding country, they are deemed to be produced by the sun and moon shining on uncoffined human remains still unburied." He also notes: "the fact that the empire is actually studded with unburied human remains... greatly nourishes belief in these spectres".

== Luocha (罗刹) ==
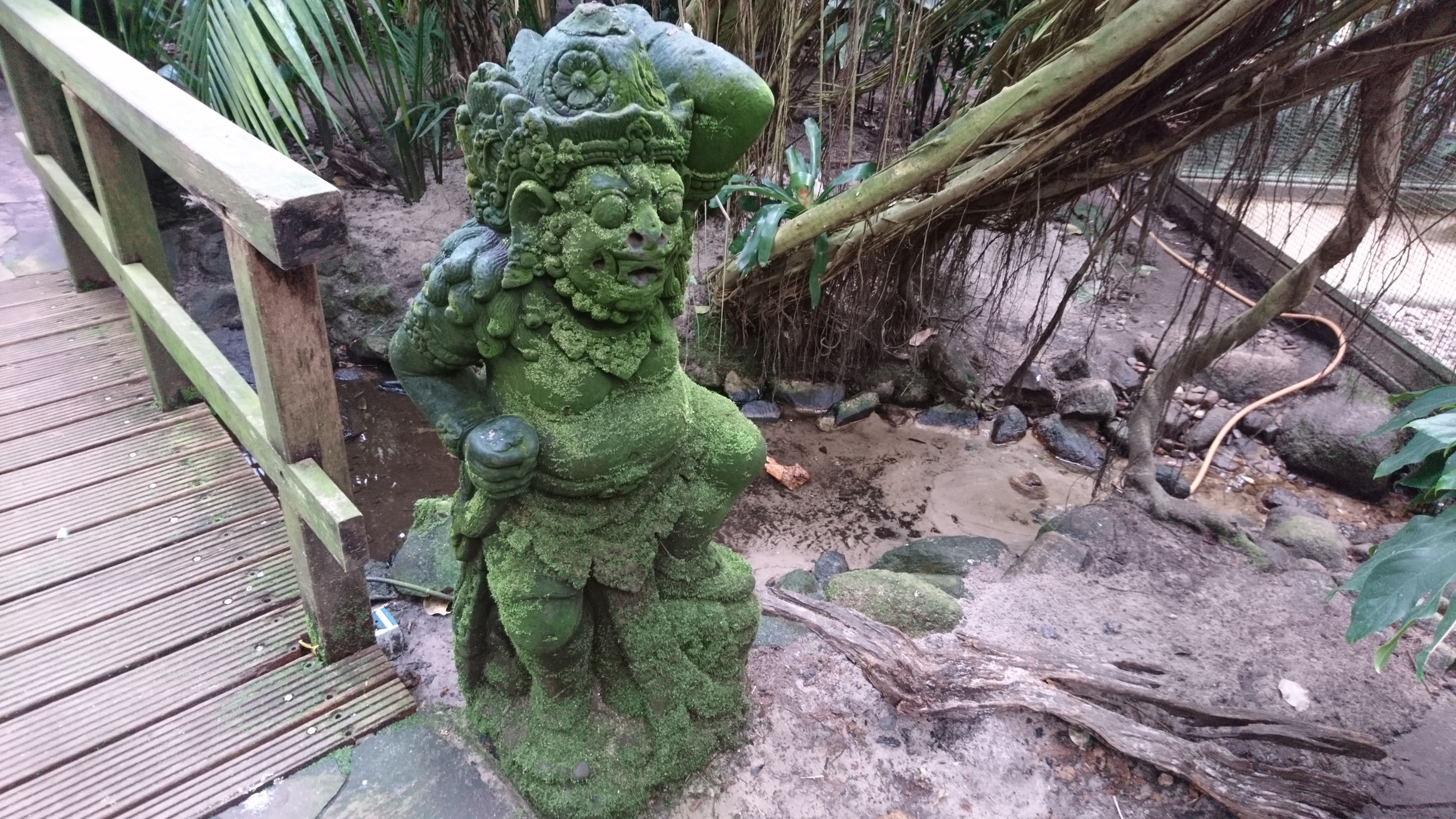
Raksha statue

Bloodthirsty malevolent demons with ugly appearances derived from Indian legend and entering China through the influence of Buddhism. They are described as evil man-eaters capable of swift and terrifying flight.

In some texts, they are described as jailers in hell tasked with punishing criminals, or as guardians of scripture upon conversion to Buddhism.

They feature in Pu Song Ling's tale "The Raksha Country and the Sea Market" as hideous beings that possess standards of beauty antithetical to that of the Chinese world, and whose society the protagonist has to cope with.

== Luo dong shen (落洞神) ==
A virgin-snatching chthonic deity who dwells in the caves of Western Hunan. Held by villagers as being responsible for the phenomenon of deadly mass hysteria or ultimately fatal delirium amongst the young and unmarried female population of Western Hunan in ancient China.

This chthonic entity allegedly chooses for his wives beautiful and unmarried maidens left over by society. A sign of a girl being selected is the sudden onset of delirium or madness, along with a refusal to eat and extreme fastidiousness. Some girls will claim the god caught a glimpse of them whilst they were passing a certain cave, others claim that the god visits them atop a rainbow. The girls inevitably wither away and slowly starve to death.

Psychologists today regard the phenomenon as the result of mass mental illness caused by either social pressure or frustration of the deep-seated need to find a spouse. Anthropologists regard the legend arising from the influence of the religion of the Miao tribe on Han Chinese beliefs.

== Niu tou ma mian (牛頭馬面) ==
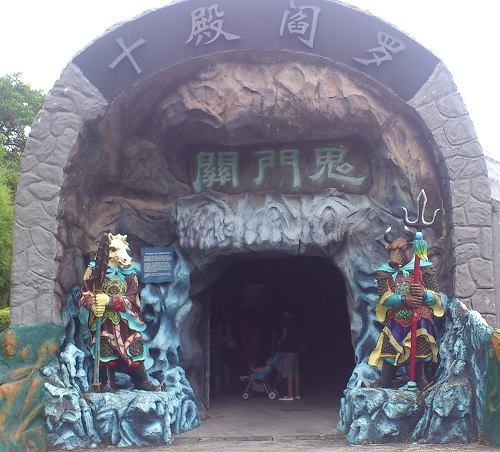
Niu Tou Ma Mian

Animal-headed psychopomps - one with the head of an ox, and the other the face of a horse, tasked with escorting the souls of the dead to the underworld, retrieving escaped souls, or enforcing various laws of the underworld. In traditional belief, they are high-ranking officials of hell, rather than being merely servants. In Taoist belief and folk superstition, they are described as the first beings one encounters at death, or upon arriving at the gates of the underworld. Also represented as torturers and jailors of hell. Their role is the execute gruesome punishments on sinners.

In popular culture, they are often represented as a kind of species of demonic beings.

== Nü gui (女鬼) ==
Nǚ guǐ (女鬼; 'female ghost'), is a vengeful female ghost with long hair in a white or red dress, a recurring trope in folklore, schoolyard rumor-mongering, urban legend, and popular culture. In folklore, this ghost is the spirit of a woman who committed suicide while wearing a red dress. Usually, she experienced some form of injustice when she was alive, such as being wronged or sexually abused. She returns to take her revenge. A tabloid story tells of a funeral ceremony where family members of a murder victim dress her in red, in the hope that her spirit will return to take revenge on her murderer. In traditional folklore, the color red symbolizes anger and vengeance. On the other hand, some ancient folktales tell of beautiful female ghosts who seduce men and suck their yang essence or sometimes kill them. This type of female ghost is likened to the Succubus. Paradoxically, the male counterpart of a nü gui, a nán guǐ (男鬼; 'male ghost'), is rarely mentioned. Apparently also found with the tale of murdering her own father.

== Penghou (彭侯) ==
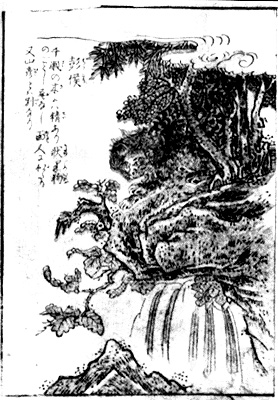
Penghou, an evil tree demon

Penghou (彭侯, lit. meaning "drumbeat marquis") is a malevolent tree spirit that takes the form of human-headed dog without a tail. It can be found growing in mountain forests and murders passing travelers. It is associated with the essence of the wood element and with camphor trees. It can also be killed, boiled, and eaten and tastes like a dog.

== Pipagui (琵琶鬼) ==
"Pipa ghost" is the Chinese transliteration of the Dai language "pibo", which is regarded as the most vicious kind of ghost in society. The Pipagui often gather in tropical areas where the climate is humid and poisonous insects, snakes, and ants are plenty. Historically, the gathering places of the Dai people were generally located in tropical rainforests, where the climate was humid, and the poisonous insects, snakes, and ants were aplenty, causing malaria to be widespread in the area; as medical conditions were limited at that time. The Dai villagers who believe in ghosts and gods think that this is the haunting of hungry ghosts – "Pipa ghost" comes from this.

"Pi" is a ghost, "Pa" is the name of a ghost, and "Pipa ghost" is a hungry ghost, which will attach itself to people. This kind of ghost generally does not have a free body, and the free body is what we call a lonely ghost. "Pipa Ghosts" are generally created by people, and those supporters cast spells to make "Pipa Ghosts" possessed by people who hate them. Once possessed by them, they will be seriously ill or in a trance, and even die in severe cases. To eliminate this symptom, one needs to take tobacco, alcohol, tea, and meat, and sincerely admit one's mistake to the caster. These people who can put "Pipa Ghosts" in the village are always frightened. Some young and bold villagers who are jealous of evil have heard that people who are possessed by "Pipa Ghosts" are generally weak in constitution, so after the village reaches an agreement, those people were driven out and their houses were burned. Those who were driven out gradually gathered to form new villages, which people called "ghost villages".

== Qianliyan (千里眼) ==
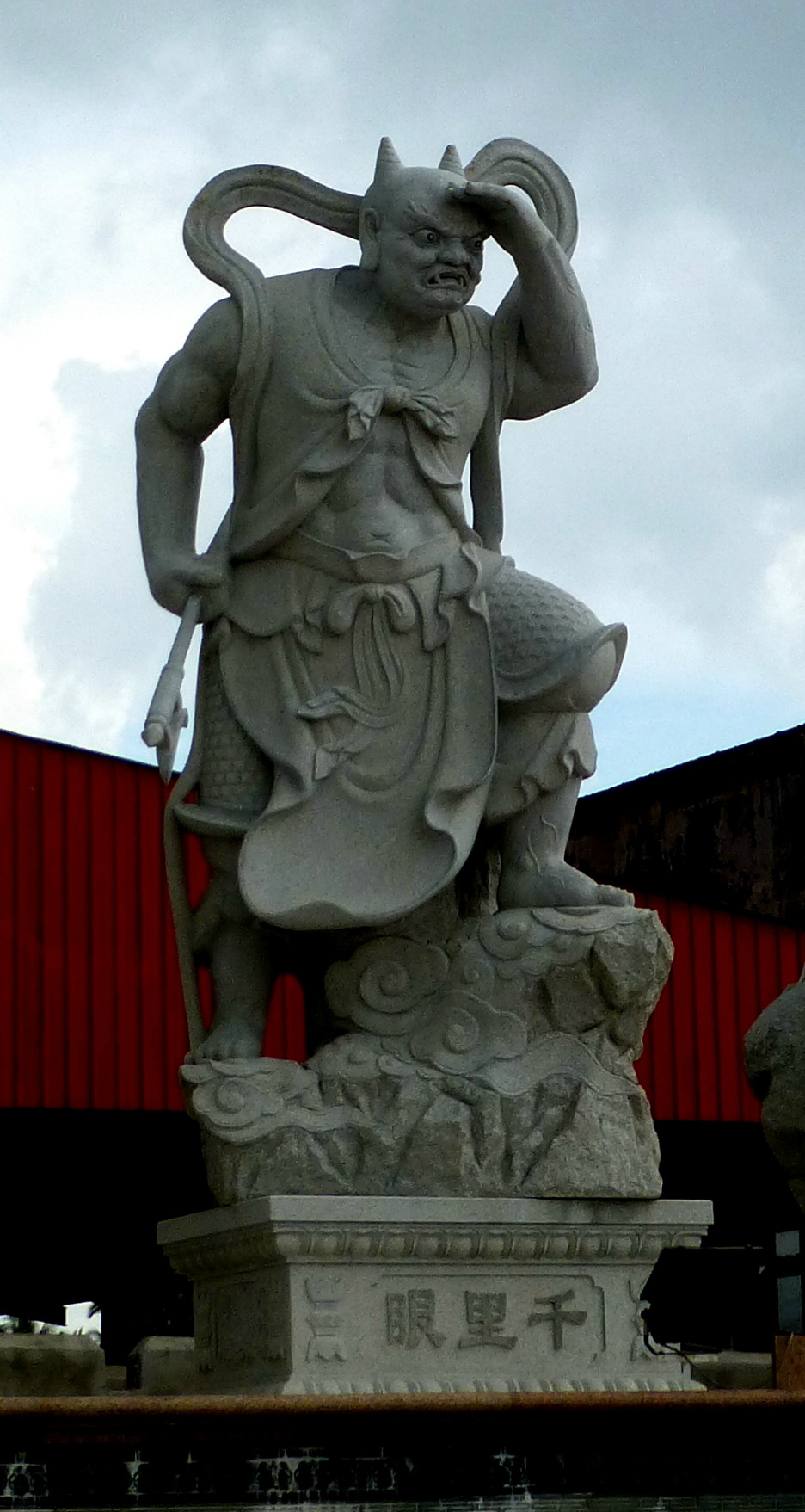
A statue of Qianliyan in Perak, Malaysia

Qianliyan is a Chinese sea and door god. He usually appears with Shunfeng'er as a guardian of the temples of the sea goddess Mazu.

Was one of two demons defeated by Mazu, or in alternative mythic accounts, a warrior and soldier of Di Xin.

== Qiongqi (穷奇) ==
Qiongqi is a man-eating monster in the form of a tiger with wings. It is associated with slander, refusing to believe in the words of good men, and enjoying the words of wicked men. One of the four fiends of ancient China.

== Shi rou (視肉) ==
A two-eyed self-regenerating lump of flesh in the shape of an ox liver. It is also known as the Feng (封) and associated with Jupiter (太歲).

This fleshy mass is capable of providing a never-ending supply of meat. Its consumption can lead to the acquisition of powers associated with immortals.

== Shui gui (水鬼) ==
Shuǐ guǐ (水鬼; 'water ghost') are the spirits of people who have drowned through either accident or by suicide. They are also known as 'water monkeys' (水猴) and are invoked as explanation for drownings. The text Zibuyu ("what the Master would discuss") transmits many such accounts. In Jiaxing, Zhejiang province, there is a tale of a black hand attempting to drag a rice merchant and his ox down into Yellow Mud Canal. In Kuaiji, there is a story of naked, black-faced beings attempting to drag a tailor down into a river with them.

De Groot observes the superstition arising as an attempt to rationalize unexplained drownings or difficulties in the water:

"should a corpse be found in the silt, its arms or legs worked deep into the mud, everyone is sure to believe it is a victim of a water-ghost, drawn down by those limbs with irresistible force. Cramps paralyzing the swimmer are likewise the clutches of a ghost."

According to tradition, being unable to reincarnate, they lurk in the place where they died, drag unsuspecting victims underwater, drowning them to take possession of their bodies. This process is known as tì shēn (替身; 'replace the body'), in which the spirit returns to life in the victim's body while the victim's spirit takes the shui gui's place and constantly seeks to take control of another living person's body.

== Shunfeng'er (順風耳) ==
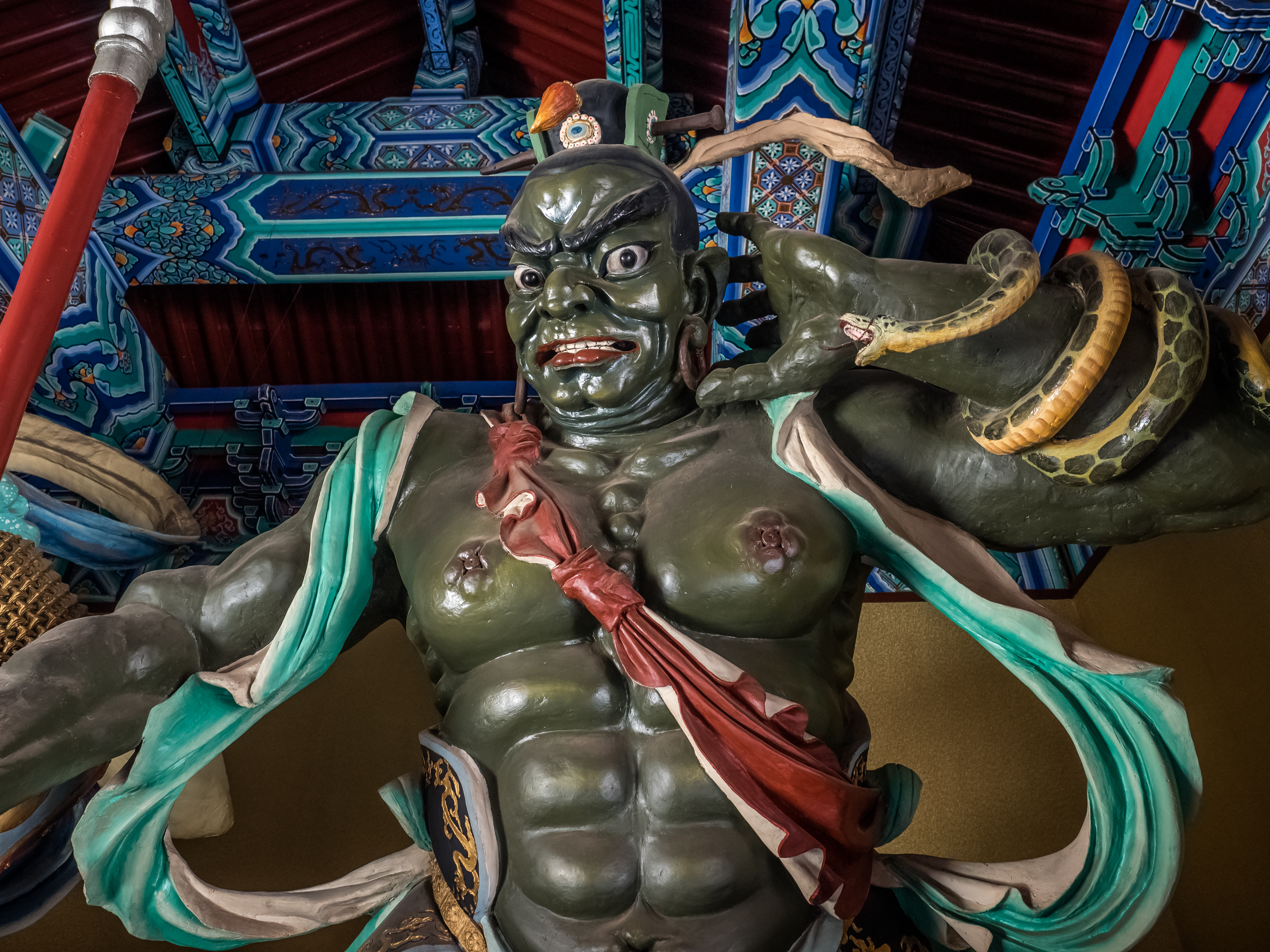
Shun Feng'Er, Tianjin

Shunfeng'er is a Chinese sea and door god. Depicted as a red-skinned or browns-skinned demon. His sharp ears are said to be able to distinguish favorable winds from coming storms for ten thousand miles.

He usually appears with Qianliyan as a guardian of the temples of the sea goddess Mazu. He was one of two ruthless generals defeated by Mazu, or else, a warrior of Di Xin.

== Snake Demons (蛇妖) ==
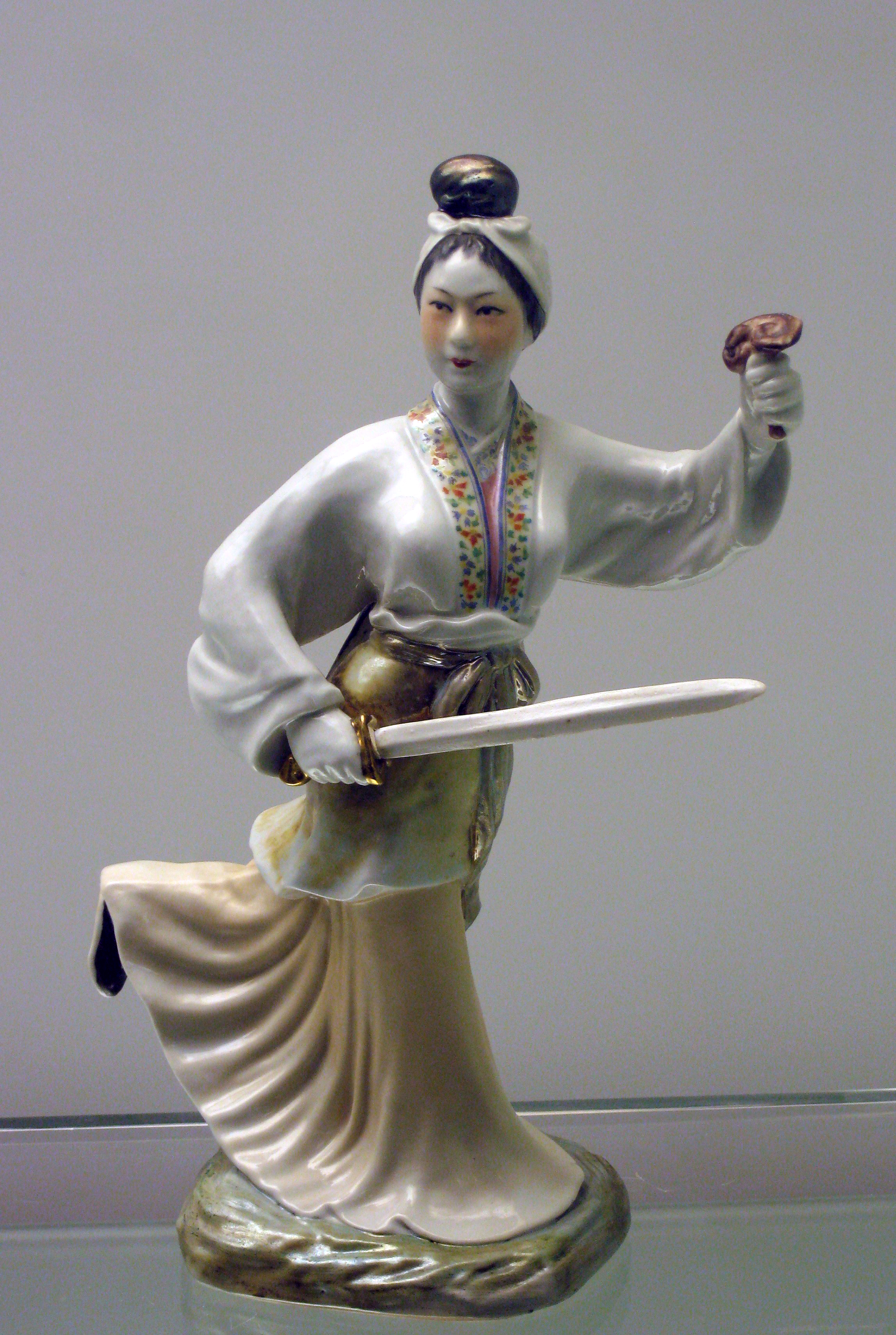
Bai Suzhen, the white snake in human form

Snake demons (蛇妖) are shapeshifters whose original form is that of a snake. In folklore, they are said to be disease-causing agents, instruments of divine punishment, and sometimes as sexual predators. They are also known as Shejing (蛇精), which literally translates to "Snake Fairy" or "Snake Essence", and which is a synonymous term.

Yen Hui, a disciple of Confucius, is described as having slain a spectre by grabbing it by the hips, causing it to change into a snake, whereupon he killed it by stabbing it with his sword.

In Shen-Mo literature, characters who are "snake demons" or "snake fairies" include Bai Suzhen - the protagonist in Legend of the White Snake and the Python Demon (蟒蛇精), an antagonistic character recorded in the Journey to the West that is eventually slain when the Monkey King bursts out of its belly.

== Taotie (饕餮) ==
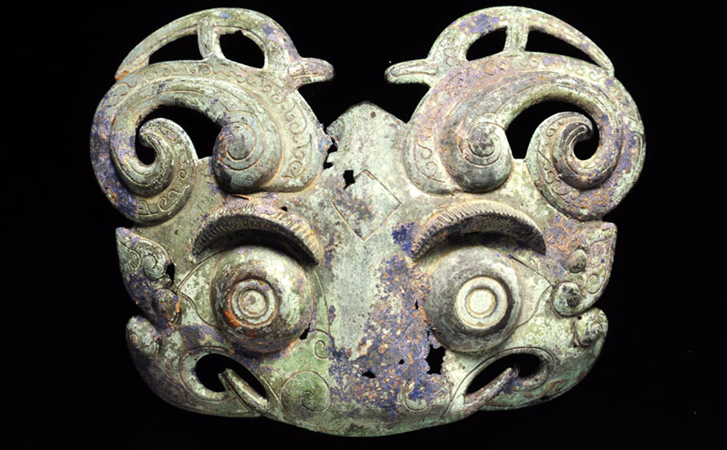
Taotie bronze mask

A rapacious creature with the body of a goat and the face and hands of a man, with eyes under its armpits and a lion's maw in its belly. It emits child-like cries but is a greedy and dangerous man-eater. Also known as the Paoxiao (狍鸮). One of the four fiends (四凶) of ancient China and commonly inscribed on ritual bronzes.

== Taowu (檮杌) ==
Taowu is kind of human-headed and lion-bodied creature with long dog-like fur, tusk-like teeth and a pig-like mouth. One of the four fiends of ancient China, representing stubbornness.

== Tiger Demons (虎妖) ==
Early Chinese literature mentions shapeshifting tigers in human form, describing them as ravening demons ranging over large areas, consuming large numbers of people. These beings form a recurring part of Chinese literature and primitive belief. Also known as the man-tiger or were-tiger (人虎) and the tiger faeries (虎精). Those slain by them are unable to reincarnate or move on and become servant spirits that do these tiger demons' bidding, and sometimes even become spirits which incite the tiger-demons to slaughter anew.

Tiger demons may take on the form of women and select an unsuspecting male as a husband. Unable to control their hunger, they eventually devour both their husbands and their children.

There is a historical record of a 22-year-old youth in 376 AD who became a tiger-like being and in a deranged mental state, devoured large numbers of people, ultimately dying of hunger in prison whilst awaiting execution. This belief is an early Chinese correlate to the Western lycanthrope and was likely driven by the same primitive fears. Men suspected of being tiger demons were often lynched by mobs in China. Some were even delivered up by magistrates to be put to death with the sanction of the state.

== Turou (土肉) ==
A being in Chinese mythology similar to the Feng (封) or Shirou (視肉) that may have been derived from an accidental encounter with a sea cucumber.

"There is also another thing in the sea called Turou that is pure black and five cun in width. It is as big as an arm of an infant. There is an abdomen but no mouth and eyes. It has 30 legs. It can be stir-fried and taken as food. This is something like a cross between a worm and a fish, and is similar to Feng"

== Wang Liang (魍魎) ==
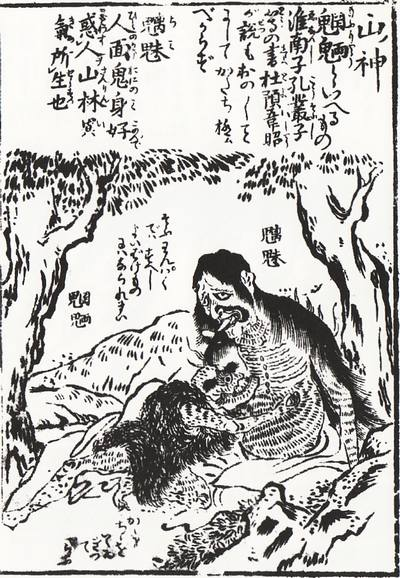
Wangliang, a wilderness demon

Wangliang (魍魎) are malevolent wilderness demons. Sometimes described as the demons of the marshes and rivers, or as apparitions in between trees and rocks, and often associated with disease. Sometimes described as having the appearance of a three-year-old child with red skin, claws, and long black hair, and with a taste for brains and livers.

The alchemist Ge Hong describes being slain by a wang liang as one of the hazards facing unwary or stupid travelers of mountain valleys.

Often contrasted with Chimei (魅魅), who are the demons of the mountains and forests. The term "chi mei wang liang" (魅魅魍魎) means all kinds of demons, goblins and ghouls and is used as a metaphor for bad people in general.

== Wang Xiang (罔象) ==
A malevolent demon associated with water, also described a fever-causing agency that is usually mentioned in the same breath as the wangliang. In the Discourses of the States, Confucius regards the wangxiang (罔象) as a water demon, and as an entirely different being to the wangliang (魍魎), which is a demon associated with rocks and trees. De Groot states that their association with fever may have been due to the observation that malaria occurs near quagmires, bogs and the mud of rivers, said to be the habitat of these beings.

In the Records of the Tripods of Xia, the Wang Xiang (罔象) is described as having the form of a three-year old child with red eyes, long black hair, and claws that is able to escape fetters to "find its (human) food".

== Wolf Demons (狼妖) ==
A shapeshifting wolf capable of assuming human form. Tales about ravening anthropomorphic wolf demons do not appear frequently until the Tang dynasty. Tales of shapeshifting wolves who assumed human form at will may have entered China through contact with Turks, Huns and Mongols. Unlike Western lycanthropes, these are beings are not "sudden and impetuous, artless and clumsy", but is a "deceitful were-specter par excellence", per De Groot.

A half-Chinese man from Taiyuan (in Shanxi) surnamed Wang and with a Hunnish mother is said to have discovered his mother was actually a wolf in human form. Another man in the Ming dynasty is said to have turned into a wolf at night in order to consume human beings during a famine. Furthermore, the annals of the Yuan (Mongol) dynasty records that in Henan province, wolves in human disguise broke into human homes at night to snatch babies.

== Wutou gui (无头鬼) ==
Wútóu guǐ (无头鬼; 無頭鬼; 'headless ghost') are headless ghosts who roam about aimlessly. They are the spirits of people who were killed by decapitation due to various causes (e.g. execution, accident). In some tales, the wutou gui approaches people at night and asks them where his/her head is. The wutou gui is sometimes depicted as carrying his/her head on the side.

== Xiaoyang (梟陽) ==
An ape-like being dwelling in the mountains, with a human face, a hair-covered body, reversed heels and a tendency to laugh loudly. They sometimes are described as forming man-eating tribes. There is a folk saying that it is better to meet a panther or a wolf than to meet with a xiaoyang, indicating the danger they pose.

== Yaksha or Yecha (夜叉) ==
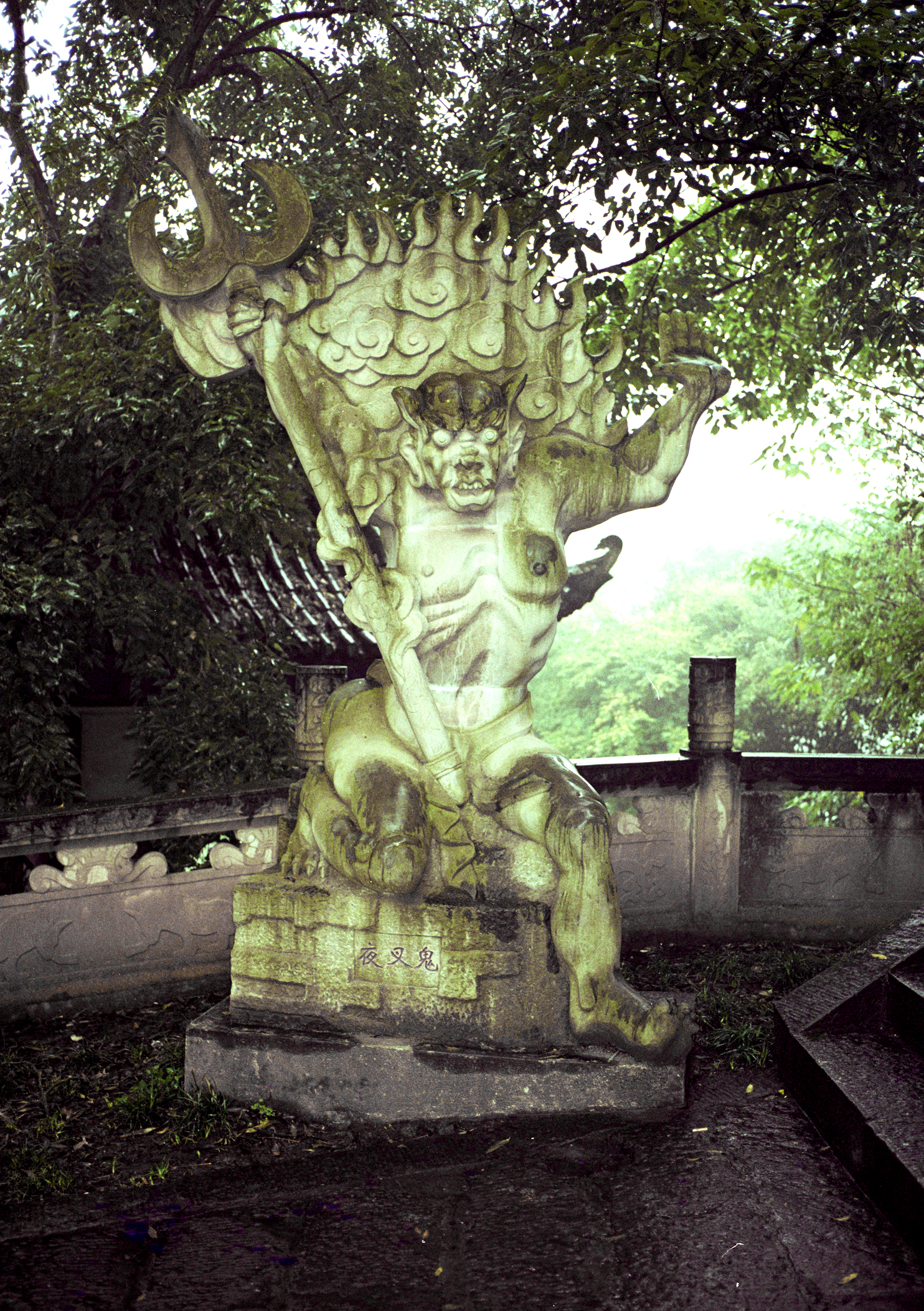
Chinese carving of a yaksha

Fearsome and malevolent demons. The Chinese transliteration of the Sanskrit word "yaksha". Demons from Indian folklore that entered into Chinese mythology through the influence of Buddhism. They appear in the Chinese Gods and Demons fiction and Records of the Strange genres of literature. These include the 16th-century classic The Investiture of the Gods and Strange Tales from a Chinese Studio.

There are two categories of yaksha 夜叉 - those that fly through the air, and those that dwell on the earth.

=== Air-traversing Yaksha (空行夜叉) ===
Air-traversing Yaksha (空行夜叉) are described as flying through the night with a pair of wings and radiating a strange glowing darkness. They are variously said to have red, blue or yellow complexions and animal heads. They take pleasure in afflicting human beings.

=== Earth-traversing Yaksha (地行夜叉) ===
Earth-traversing Yaksha (地行夜叉) are described as having flaming eyebrows, being several meters in height, and having a strange half-moon formation in between their eyes.

Today, used yecha 夜叉 is commonly employed as a metaphor to describe anyone who is both ferocious and unpleasant.

== You hun ye gui (游魂野鬼) ==
yóu hún yě guǐ (游魂野鬼; 'wandering souls and wild ghosts') refer to the wandering spirits of the dead. They roam the world of the living in the Seventh Lunar Month (typically August in the Gregorian calendar) during the Ghost Festival. These spirits include vengeful ghosts seeking revenge on those who offended them before, hungry ghosts (see the E gui section above), and playful spirits who might cause trouble during that period.

Some of these spirits have no living relatives or resting place, while others might lose their way and cannot return to the Underworld in time, so they continue to roam the world of the living after the Seventh Lunar Month. In Taiwan, there are shrines and temples set up for the worship of "You Ying Gong" (有應公; 有应公; Yǒu Yìng Gōng), a name which collectively refers to such "lost" spirits, in the hope that these spirits would not cause harm to the living. There are classified by some scholars from various universities in Taiwan. Some of these spirits may become deities known as "Wang Ye" (王爺; 王爷; Wáng yé; 'royal lord').

The Chinese idiom gū hún yě guǐ (孤魂野鬼; 'lonely souls and wild ghosts'), which describes such spirits, is also used to refer to homeless people or those who wander around aimlessly.

== Yuan gui (怨鬼) ==
Yuan gui (冤鬼; yuān guǐ; 'ghost with grievance') are the spirits of persons who died wrongful deaths. Beliefs in such ghosts had surfaced in China from as early as the Zhou dynasty and were recorded in the historical text Zuo Zhuan. These ghosts can neither rest in peace nor be reincarnated. They roam the world of the living as depressed and restless spirits who constantly seek to have their grievances redressed. In some tales, these ghosts approach living people and attempt to communicate with them in order to lead them to clues or pieces of evidence that point out that they died wrongful deaths. The living people then try to help them clear their names or otherwise ensure that justice is served.

== Ying ling (婴灵) ==
Ying ling (嬰靈; 婴灵; yīng líng; 'infant spirit') refer to the spirits of dead fetuses. The idea of such spirits are purported to have originated in Japan. Memorial services are held for them in Taiwan. A writer identified as "Zuigongzi" (lit. "drunk gentleman") wrote an article on thinkerstar.com in 2004 to claim that the stories of ying ling were fabricated.

== Zaochi (凿齿) ==
A long-toothed humanoid monster wielding a large shield in the habit of abducting and eating humans. It was ultimately killed by the archer Yi, who shot it through the heart as it was fleeing.

Anthropologists posit that the legend originates from the actual encounter between early Chinese settlers and the stigmatized aboriginal tribes they found in the southern parts of the country who may have engaged in cannibalism.

== Zhi ren (纸人) ==
Zhi ren (紙人; 纸人; zhǐ rén; 'paper person') are dolls made from paper that are burnt as offerings to the dead to become the deceased's servants. These dolls usually come in pairs – one male and one female – and are sometimes called jin tong yu nü (金童玉女; jīn tóng yù nǚ; 'golden boy and jade girl'). These dolls are not exactly spirits by themselves, but they can do the bidding of their deceased masters. Making these paper dolls was regarded as an abhorrent profession due to the association with death.

== Zhizhujing (蜘蛛精) ==
In the Journey to the West, seven spider demons capable of assuming the form of lovely maidens and of shooting webs from their navels reside in Silkweb Cave. They desire to eat the flesh of the monk Tang Sanzang. The spider demons are ultimately crushed by Sun WuKong.

== Zhong yin shen ==
Zhong yin shen (中陰身; 中阴身; zhōng yīn shēn; 'intermediate yin body') refers to a spirit in a transition state between their death and when they are reincarnated, as described in Mahayana Buddhism. This period of time is usually 49 days.

== Others ==
=== A ===
- Ao (媪)

=== B ===
- Baiye (白鵺)
- Bijianshou (比肩兽)
- Bifang (毕方)
- Bingfeng (并封)
- Bi'an (狴犴)
- Bixie (辟邪)
- Babo'erben (灞波儿奔)
- Bingcan (冰蚕)
- Bingmo (病魔)
- Benbo'erba (奔波儿灞)
- Bo (駮)
- Baiyanmojun (百眼魔君)
- Bishuijinjingshou (避水金晶兽)
- Baoyu (薄鱼)
- Baiyuan (白猿)
- Bailong (白龙)
- Bailu (白鹿)
- Benfu (奔浮)
- Baijueyao (败屩妖)
- Banyiguipo (斑衣鳜婆)
- Boyi (猼訑)

=== C ===
- Chiyou (蚩尤)
- Chenshimingji (沉石明鸡)
- Chaofeng (嘲风)
- Citie (呲铁)
- Chiru (赤鱬)
- Chongwei (虫为)
- Chilong (赤龙)
- Chenghuang (乘黄)
- Chihu (赤虎)
- Chishejing (赤蛇精)
- Chousheng (仇生)
- Chishengui (赤身鬼)
- Chaigui (虿鬼)
- Changui (产鬼)
- Chunshisanniang (春十三娘)
- Chikaomahou (赤尻马猴)
- Ciluo (茈蠃)
- Changgui (伥鬼)

=== D ===
- Dongmingcao (洞冥草)
- Dongxi (东曦)
- Dongtai (动态)
- Dafeng (大风)
- Dapeng (大鹏)
- Dangui (丹龟)
- Dansheng (担生)
- Delang (地狼)
- Danxia (丹虾)
- Danque (丹雀)
- Dufujin (妒妇津)
- Donghaikuiniu (东海夔牛)
- Daoli (盗骊)
- Dijiang (帝江)
- Dihong (帝鸿)
- Daoshou (倒寿)
- Dushelong (毒蛇龙)
- Duzugui (独足鬼)
- Dujiaomowang (独角魔王)
- Duoji (多即)
- Damangjing (大蟒精)
- Dapengmowang (大鹏魔王)
- Dangkang (当康)
- Danyu (丹鱼)
- Dujiaoyang (独角羊)
- Dujiaosidawang (独角兕大王)
- Duyao (蠹妖)
- Dujiaogui (独脚鬼)

=== E ===
- Ershu (耳鼠)
- Erzhongren (耳中人)
- Eshou (讹兽)

=== F ===
- Fuyao (蝠妖)
- Feifei (腓腓)
- Fengxi (封豨)
- Fengli(风狸)
- Fengguanniangzi (凤管娘子)
- Fuziguai (蝮子怪)
- Fuxi (凫徯)
- Fuzhu (夫诸)
- Fuyuanjun (福缘君)
- Fenyang (羵羊)
- Fei (蜚)
- Fuchong (蝮虫)
- Feishu (飞鼠)
- Feitouman (飞头蛮)
- Feidanniao (飞诞鸟)
- Feiyi (肥遗)
- Fengwulao (峰五老)
- Fenghuang (凤凰)
- Fengyao (蜂妖)
- Feilian (飞廉)
- Fuyunsou (拂云叟)
- Feiniao (吠鸟)

=== G ===
- Gongzhouchengsanguai (巩州城三怪)
- Gu (鼓)
- Goutouman (狗头鳗)
- Guohou (国后)
- Guhuoniao (姑获鸟)
- Guozhang (国丈)
- Goushe (钩蛇)
- Guixu (归墟)
- Guzhigong (孤直公)
- Guanxiongren (贯匈人)
- Guailong (乖龙)
- Gubailao (古柏老)
- Guiche (鬼车)
- Guili (鬼吏)
- Gudiao (蛊雕)

=== H ===
- Heihai’ertaizi (黑孩儿太子)
- Huowu (火乌)
- Huan (讙)
- Heifengguai (黑风怪)
- Huangzhangmowang (慌张魔王)
- Heilong (黑龙)
- Henggongyu (横公鱼)
- Huapo (花魄)
- Hongni (虹霓)
- Huoxing (火星)
- Huangpaoguai (黄袍怪)
- Heyu (合逾)
- Huanglong (黄龙)
- Huangfengguai (黄风怪)
- Huashe (化蛇)
- Huan (患)
- Huying (虎鹰)
- Huweimowang (虎威魔王)
- Hongliuwa (红榴娃)
- Huangyalaoxiang (黄牙老象)
- Huagai (华盖)
- Honglindamang (红鳞大蟒)
- Hongnv (虹女)
- Hairuo (海若)
- Haozhi (豪彘)
- Huiyao (虺妖)
- Hunshimowang (混世魔王)
- Hundun (浑沌)
- Huangshijing (黄狮精)
- Honghai’er (红孩儿)
- Huangmeidawang (黄眉大王)
- Haizhizhu (海蜘蛛)
- Huayao (花妖)
- Huoshu (火鼠)
- Humeiniang (胡媚娘)
- Heluoyu (何罗鱼)
- Heiyujing (黑鱼精)
- Haoyu (豪鱼)
- Haoqimowang (耗气魔王)
- Hushen (虎神)
- Huangfengdawang (黄风大王)
- Huangfugui (黄父鬼)
- Hanli (含利)
- Hou (犼)
- Huodou (祸斗)
- Huangui (患鬼)
- Hu’aqi (狐阿七)
- Hulidaxian (虎力大仙)

=== J ===
- Junren (菌人)
- Jinjiao (金角)
- Jinhuamao (金华猫)
- Jiuweihu (九尾狐)
- Jiutouzhijijing (九头雉鸡精)
- Jiu’erquan (九耳犬)
- Jiaochong (骄虫)
- Jiuweigui (九尾龟)
- Jiaoren (鲛人)
- Jiuselu (九色鹿)
- Jimeng (计蒙)
- Jigui/Ma ga/Phi cay (鸡鬼)
- Jiaoduan (角端)
- Jiangtun (江豚)
- Jinjieshibagong (劲节十八公)
- Jiutoufuma (九头驸马)
- Jiulingyuansheng (九灵元圣)
- Jidiao (吉吊)
- Jiliang (吉量)
- Jufu (举父)
- Jietuodawang (解脱大王)
- Jiuying (九婴)
- Jimeng (计蒙)
- Jiaogui (角圭)
- Jiao (狡)
- Jiaojing (鲛精)
- Jiulingyuanshengliusun (九灵元圣六孙)
- Jiaomowang (蛟魔王)
- Jianglaizhixu (姜赖之墟)
- Jiao (蛟)
- Jiaolong (角龙) (the monster)
- Jiaohu (角虎)
- Jiegou (絜钩)
- Jiuweishe (九尾蛇)
- Jueyuan (攫猿)
- Jianke (谏珂)
- Jingren (靖人)
- Juru (狙如)
- Jiuchong (酒虫)

=== K ===
- Kun (鲲)
- Kaimingshou (开明兽)
- Kui (夔)
- Kuilong (夔龙)

=== L ===
- Lingmingshihou (灵明石猴)
- Lushu (鹿蜀)
- Long (龙)
- Laojian (老蹇)
- Longchu (龙刍)
- Liukunmowang (六鲲魔王)
- Longbo (龙伯)
- Lvtoulang (驴头狼)
- Lingyu (陵鱼)
- Liu’ermowang (六耳魔王)
- Longzhi (蠪姪)
- Luotoumin (落头民)
- Luoshaniao (罗刹鸟)
- Liuzushou (六足兽)
- Luozu (罗祖)
- Lvlang (绿郎)
- Lingguilao (灵龟老)
- Lili (狸力)
- Lingkongzi (凌空子)
- Linggui (灵龟)
- Linggandawang (灵感大王)
- Lingque (灵鹊)
- Lingshuangshiping (灵爽式凭)
- Liu’ermihou (六耳猕猴)
- Lvshu (驴鼠)
- Liuyudawang (六欲大王)
- Lvma (驴马)
- Luoluo (罗罗)
- Lintaojuren (临洮巨人)
- Liushen (柳神)
- Lulidaxian (鹿力大仙)
- Luoyu (蠃鱼)
- Luan (鸾)
- Luanxiaofuren (鸾萧夫人)

=== M ===
- Meishanqiguai (梅山七怪)
- Mogui (魔鬼)
- Mishimowang (迷识魔王)
- Mabanshe (马绊蛇)
- Mafu (马腹)
- Manman (蛮蛮)
- Maolong (毛龙)
- Miyao (麋妖)
- Minniao (民鸟)
- Maren (马人)
- Manjintai (蔓金苔)
- Mihouwang (猕猴王)
- Meiweijun (美蔚君)
- Muwangbajun (穆王八骏)
- Mamian (马面)
- Miwang (蜜王)
- Mukeniao (木客鸟)
- Mo (魔)
- Miaogui (庙鬼)
- Mingshe (鸣蛇)
- Menglangmowang (孟浪魔王)
- Mohai (魔㺔)
- Maorongpo (猫容婆)
- Maogui (猫鬼)

=== N ===
- Nanhaijiaoren (南海鲛人)
- Nanhaihudie (南海蝴蝶)
- Niumowang (牛魔王)
- Niexiaoqian (聂小倩)
- Nvegui (疟鬼)
- Nigui (泥鬼)
- Niuyu (牛鱼)
- Nanshandawang (南山大王)
- Niutou (牛头)
- Nüyecha (女夜叉)
- Niunengyan (牛能言)

=== P ===
- Pixiu (貔貅)
- Pufu (朴父)
- Panguan (判官)
- Pianpian (翩翩)
- Pojingshou (破镜兽)
- Pipajing (琵琶精)
- Peng (鹏)
- Paoxiao (咆鸮)
- Penghou (彭侯)
- Pengshe (朋蛇)
- Pihandawang 辟寒大王
- Pishudawang 辟暑大王
- Pichendawang 辟尘大王

=== Q ===
- Quehuoque (却火雀)
- Qiuyu (犰狳) (the monster)
- Qiongqi (穷奇)
- Qingshidaoren (青狮道人)
- Qingyujing (鲭鱼精)
- Qingwashen (青蛙神)
- Qing’e (青娥)
- Qingshiwang (青狮王)
- Qilin (麒麟)
- Quechenxi (却尘犀)
- Qiuniu (囚牛)
- Qiqingdawang (七情大王)
- Qingwen (青鴍)
- Qingniu (青牛)
- Qiangliang (强良)
- Qiongshu (邛疏)
- Quzhousanguai (衢州三怪)
- Qinzhimaoren (秦之毛人)
- Qingchunshijiedawangxiaoyuewang (青春世界大王小月王)
- Qingfeng (青凤)
- Qidaosheng (七大圣)
- Qiantangjun (銭塘君)
- Qingji (庆忌)
- Quexiandawang (缺陷大王)
- Qiyu (契俞)
- Quru (瞿如)
- Qinglong (青龙)
- Qionggui (穷鬼)
- Qionglang (玱琅)
- Qinyuan (钦原)
- Qizhong (跂踵)

=== R ===
- Ruyizhenxian (如意真仙)
- Riji (日及)
- Ruishi (瑞狮)
- Renmianxiao (人面鸮)
- Renhu (人虎)
- Ruhe (如何)
- Renshe (人蛇)
- Ranyiyu (冉遗鱼)

=== S ===
- Sanzuwu (三足乌)
- Shijiniangniang (石矶娘娘)
- Sanshi (三尸)
- Shejing (蛇精)
- Sanjiaoshou (三角兽)
- Suanni (狻猊)
- Shuairan (率然)
- Sanzugui (三足龟)
- Shen (蜃)
- Sandaxian (三大仙)
- Shangfu (尚付)
- Songhu (耸弧)
- Shangyang (商羊)
- Shanjiao (山椒)
- Sixiong (四凶)
- Shexian (蛇衔)
- Shengsheng (狌狌)
- Shihoumowang (狮吼魔王)
- Sanshidawang (三尸大王)
- Shuihu (水虎)
- Sibuxiang (四不像)
- Shimaoguai (狮毛怪)
- Shuiluogui (水落鬼)
- Suanyu (酸与)
- Shangao (山膏)
- Shituowang (狮驼王)
- Shanheshang (山和尚)
- Sanzubie (三足鳖)
- Sidashenhou (四大神猴)
- Shanqingjun (善庆君)
- Sangku (丧哭)
- Shanzhizhu (山蜘蛛)
- Shituolingsanmowang (狮驼岭三魔王)
- Saitaisui (赛太歳)
- Shuangjing (双睛)
- Suoming (索冥)
- Shile (世乐)
- Shuoyinmowang (铄阴魔王)
- Shanshao (山臊)
- Shanxiao (山魈)
- Sunwukong (孙悟空)
- Sunxiaosheng (孙小圣)
- Shawujing (沙悟净)
- Shuhu (孰胡)
- Shelujing (麝鹿精)

=== T ===
- Taotie (饕餮)
- Taowu (梼杌)
- Tianzhi (天织)
- Tieshangongzhu (铁扇公主)
- Tongbiyuanhou (通臂猿猴)
- Tunkou (呑口)
- Tulou (土蝼)
- Tiebeiqiuwang (铁背虬王)
- Tenghua (藤花)
- Taige (鲐鮯)
- Tuofei (橐蜚)
- Tianhu (天狐)
- Tiaoshen (跳神)
- Techushi (特处士)
- Tianlu (天鹿)
- Tianyucao (天雨草)
- Tongren (瞳人)
- Taisui (太岁)

=== W ===
- Wuzhiqi (无支祁)
- Wangxiang (罔象)
- Wangyuyu (王馀鱼)
- Wangmushizhe (王母使者)
- Wutongshen (五通神)
- Waguai (蛙怪)
- Wenmingdawang (文明大王)
- Wanshenglongwang (万圣龙王)
- Wenwen (文文)
- Wujing (鼯精)
- Weiyi (委蛇)
- Wuzushou (五足兽)
- Woquan (偓佺)
- Wenyaoyu (文鳐鱼)
- Wangtianhou (望天吼)
- Woquan (偓佺)
- Wushang (无伤)
- Wangliang (魍魉)
- Wuwenhua (邬文化)

=== X ===
- Xianzhuzhilong (衔烛之龙)
- Xuhao (虚耗)
- Xiwangmu (西王母)
- Xiezijing (蝎子精)
- Xiebao (谢豹)
- Xiexiaoyao (蝎小妖)
- Xishu (奚鼠)
- Xiezhi (獬豸)
- Xuanfeng (玄蜂)
- Xuanwu (玄武)
- Xixi (鰼鰼)
- Xianli (仙狸)
- Xiaoniao (枭鸟)
- Xiangliu (相柳)
- Xiquan (犀犬)
- Xiaoyangmowang (消阳魔王)
- Xixuejuren (吸血巨人)
- Xingyunmowang (兴云魔王)
- Xiaofu (啸父)
- Xiushe (修蛇)
- Xuanyu (玄鱼)
- Xuangui (旋龟)
- Xingtian (刑天)
- Xinang (溪嚢)
- Xiyou (希有)
- Xiaofengmowang (啸风魔王)
- Xuansu (玄俗)
- Xinang (傒囊)
- Xurongwang (獝狨王)

=== Y ===
- Yazi (睚眦)
- Yaojiao (鳐鲛)
- Yinjiao (银角)
- Yigui (缢鬼)
- Yinglong (应龙)
- Yanju (炎驹)
- Yijiaoshou (一角兽)
- Yimuwuxiansheng (一目五先生)
- Yalongdaxian (压龙大仙)
- Yuantuo (鼋鼍)
- Yayu (猰貐)
- Yupei (育沛)
- Yi (鹢)
- Yuanfeiji (远飞鸡)
- Yingshengchong (应声虫)
- Yigui (役鬼)
- Yumiangongzhu (玉面公主)
- Yumianniangniang (玉面娘娘)
- Yingmu (影木)
- Yinggou (嬴勾) and Yinggou (赢勾)
- Youanniao (幽安鸟)
- Yunyang (云阳)
- Yaomoguiguai (妖魔鬼怪)
- Yutao (玉桃)
- Yeniao (冶鸟)
- Yatun (牙豚)
- Yutou (鱼头)
- Yegouzi (野狗子)
- Yecha (夜叉)
- Yonghe (雍和)
- Yinguai (阴怪) and Yangguai (阳怪)
- Yuji (玉鸡)
- Yong (颙)
- Yaogui (咬鬼)
- Youlaiyouqu (有来有去)
- Yunzhongzi (云中子)
- Yuyiren (羽衣人)
- Yuanyao (蚖妖)
- Yunchengwanlipeng (云程万里鹏)
- Yufu (鱼妇)
- Yingzhao (英招)
- Yuanxian (元仙)
- Yaoshou (药兽)
- Yanwei (延维)
- Yaueshen (岳神)
- Yinchen Mowang (阴沉魔王)
- Yiniao (翳鸟)
- Yigui (疫鬼)
- Yu (蜮)
- Yanglidaxian (羊力大仙)
- Yutujing (玉兔精)
- Yinglong (应龙)
- Yeming (噎鸣)
- Yujiang (禺疆)

=== Z ===
- Zaochi (凿齿)
- Zhutunshe (猪豚蛇)
- Zhubajie (猪八戒)
- Zhujian (诸犍)
- Zhupolong (猪婆龙)
- Zhunou (朱獳)
- Zhizhujing (蜘蛛精)
- Zaohuaxiao'er (造化小儿)
- Zaoju (藻居)
- Zhongguobashenshou (中国八神兽)
- Zhuyijie (猪一戒)
- Zhaohaijing (照海镜)
- Zheng (狰)
- Zhuyan (朱厌)
- Zhuyin (烛阴)
- Zhuyu (祝余)
- Zhen (鸩)
- Zhujiweng (祝鸡翁)
- Zhaiyao (宅妖)
- Zhuque (朱雀)
- Zhuoquan (䶂犬)
- Zhanyanjiejiebulaopopo (长颜姐姐不老婆婆)
- Zhangyou(长右)
- Zhongmingniao(重明鸟)
- Zhuniao (鴸鸟)
- Zhujiweng (祝鸡翁)
- Zouyu (驺虞)

== See also ==
- Chinese mythology
- Chinese folklore
- Hungry ghosts in Chinese religion
- Radical 194
