= Four Perils =

Four malevolent beings in Chinese mythology

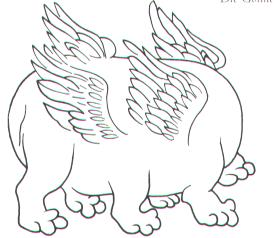
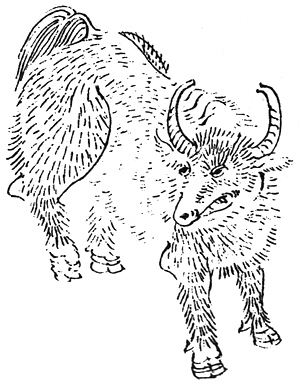
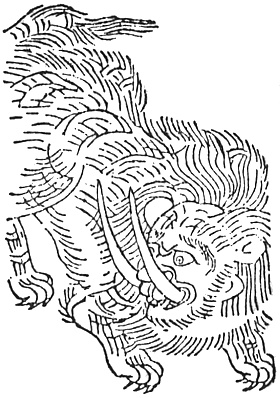
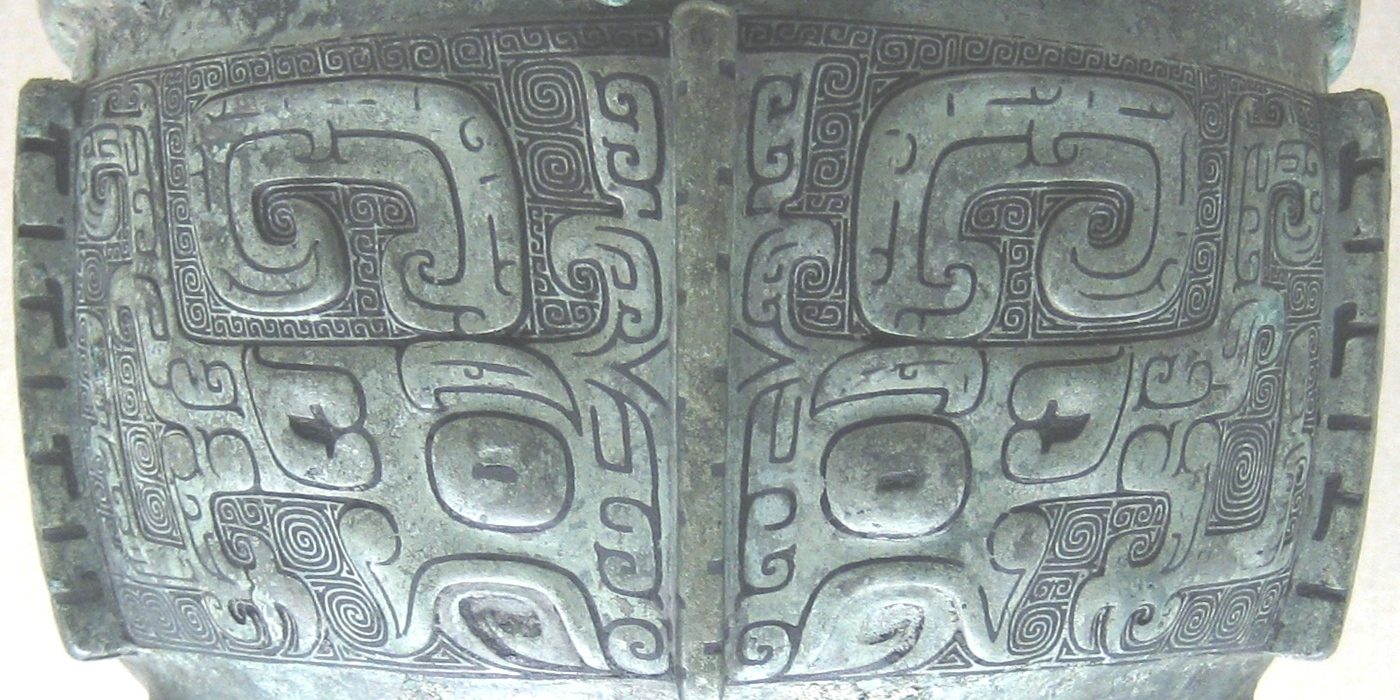
- Clockwise: Hundun, Qiongqi, Taotie, and Taowu.

Chinese name
- Chinese: 四凶
- Literal meaning: Four Perils
Transcriptions
Standard Mandarin
- Hanyu Pinyin: Sì Xiōng

Japanese name
- Kanji: 四凶
- Hiragana: しきょう
Transcriptions
- Romanization: Shikyō

The Four Perils (Chinese: 四凶; pinyin: Sì Xiōng) are four malevolent beings that exist in Chinese mythology.

== In the Zuo Zhuan ==
In the Zuo Zhuan, Shanhaijing, and Shenyijing, the Four Perils (Sì Xiōng) are defined as:

- Hundun (渾敦, 混沌; Hùndùn; 'chaotic torrent' (Note: a.k.a. 帝江; Dìjiāng; 'Emperor River', 'Thearch River')), a yellow winged creature of chaos with six legs and no face;
- Qiongqi (窮奇; Qióngqí; 'distressingly strange', 'thoroughly odd'), a monstrous creature that eats people,
- Taowu (檮杌; Táowù; 'block stump'), a reckless, stubborn creature; The Taowu is said to appear with "a human face, a tiger's feet, a pig's tusks and a tail 18 feet long."
- Taotie (饕餮; Tāotiè; 'greedy glutton'), a gluttonous beast.

The Zuo Zhuan does not describe these four beings as mythological beasts, but instead as "historical" persons. Hundun is said to have descended from Emperor Hong (Note: 帝鴻; Dìhóng; 'Emperor Swan', 'Thearch Swan'), Qiongqi from Shaohao, Taowu from Zhuanxu, and Taotie from the Jinyun lineage. This narrative is also used by Sima Qian in his record of the Three Sovereigns and Five Emperors period in Records of the Grand Historian.

== In the Classic of Mountains and Seas ==
The Classic of Mountains and Seas records Hundun and Qiongqi, but omits Taowu and Taotie, and there is no specific tie between the two creatures.

Qiongqi is given two conflicting descriptions in the Classic of Mountains and Seas. The first is in the Classic of the Western Mountains (西山經), where it is described as a man-eating beast residing on Mt. Gui ({邽山), possessing hedgehog-like fur and crying like a howling dog. The second description, in the Classic of the Northern Seas' Inner Realm (海內北經), records it as resembling a tiger with wings, eating people with dishevelled hair, starting from either the head or the feet.

Hundun is given the name Di Jiang (帝江) in the classic, a name usually given to thearchs, and is usually translated into English as "emperor," such as with Emperor Shun, Emperor Yao, and the Yellow Emperor. It resides on Mt. Tian (天山) and has a round, yellow sack-like body with a cinnabar-coloured pattern, as well as four wings and six legs, but neither a mouth nor eyes. However, it also sings and dances. The adjective hundun (渾敦), a homophone with the name Hundun, is used to describe it.

== In the Book of Gods and Strange Things ==
Taowu in Gujin Tushu Jicheng, using the description from the Book of Gods and Strange Things.

The Book of Gods and Strange Things mentions the Four Perils, and links Taotie, Taowu, and Hundun together in the Ten Examples from the Southwestern Wilderness (西南荒經三則) chapter.

Hundun is the first mentioned of the Perils, said to be located east of the Kunlun Mountains. It has a quadruped, dog-like body, sort of like a brown bear, but without claws. While it is described as having eyes, it cannot see, and cannot begin to walk. Despite having two ears, it cannot hear. It has a belly but no internal organs, and its intestines are straight, so food passes straight through its body. Those of virtue go against it, those without it rely on it. Tian is said to have created it, which is from where it gets its name. The name Di Jiang is not mentioned here.

The received description of Taowu is first mentioned in this text. It is said to be a monster with a human face, a tiger's feet, a pig's mouth and teeth, and a tail 18-foot long. It is also given two alternate names: Aohen (傲狠) and Nanxun (難訓).

Taotie is described as a theme and personality trait, using the word ren (人) "person" to describe it, rather than the regular shou (獸) "beast." It claims the people have fur and a pig's hood. It is as greedy as a wolf, but will not eat a person's grain. It feeds on the old and feeble, but fears those in groups. It also lists three other names: Tanlin 貪惏), Qiangduo (強奪), and Lingruo (凌弱), and cites the Zuo Zhuan to note that Taotie is the son of Jinyun. In the Ten Examples from the Western Wilderness (西荒經十則), Taotie is also used as an adjective to describe the Miao people, claiming they are greedy and unreasonable.

The text embellishes the second account of Qiongqi from the Classic of the Northern Seas' Inner Realm chapter of the Classic of Mountains and Seas. However, it is recorded separately from the other Perils, in the Ten Examples from the Northwestern Wilderness chapter (西北荒經六則). In addition to being a tiger-like creature that eats people, it is also said to understand human speech, and eat those who are in the right when they are arguing with someone. It will also eat the nose of those who are trustworthy and loyal, and kill beasts to feed those who are wicked. It is said to eat beasts and birds.

== Identification ==
Zhang Shoujie's Correct Meanings of the Record of the Grand Historian (史記正義; Shǐjì Zhèngyì) identifies Huandou with Hundun (渾沌), Gonggong with Qiongqi (窮竒), Gun with Taowu (檮杌), and the Sanmiao (三苗) with Taotie (饕餮).

== See also ==
- Four Barbarians
- Four Horsemen of the Apocalypse
- Four Criminals
