= Taowu =

One of the Four Perils in Chinese mythology

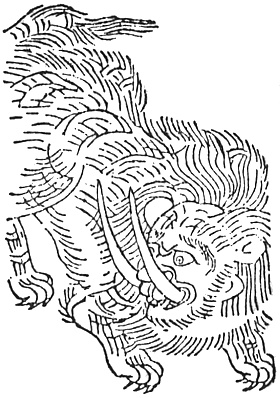
- Edo period illustration
- Traditional Chinese: 檮杌
- Simplified Chinese: 梼杌
Transcriptions
Standard Mandarin
- Hanyu Pinyin: táowù
Yue: Cantonese
- Jyutping: to^{4} ngat^{6}
Middle Chinese
- Middle Chinese: daw-ngwot

Taowu is a mythical creature mentioned in the Chinese classics. Along with Hundun, Qiongqi, and Taotie, it is one of the Four Perils.

== Etymology ==
Taowu is composed of two characters, both of which are quite rare. Paul W. Kroll et al link 檮/梼 tao with a block of wood or a tree stump, and 杌 wu is normally used to refer to a stool. In Records of the Grand Historian, 檮 tao is written with the character 梼, which is also the simplified form.

Semantically, the name originally referred to some sort of beast. However, its meaning extended over time to refer to mythical creatures in general, a now-lost text referring to the history of Chu, and violent, stubborn people.

== In traditional historiography ==
Sima Qian records Taowu as a label given to a rebellious, destructive son of Zhuanxu, the progenitor of the Youyu clan. He was devoid of ability, stubborn, ignorant to instruction, and could not be appeased. The trouble he caused would continue throughout the reign of Emperor Yao of the Taotang clan, until Emperor Shun of the Youyu clan would receive him along with the other Four Perils, banishing them to the outer reaches of the kingdom and expelling evil spirits.

Guoyu and Shuo Yuan record Taowu as residing at Mt. Pi (丕山) during the Shang dynasty.

The Book of Gods and Strange Things records Taowu as a monster with a human face, a tiger's feet, a pig's mouth and teeth, and a tail 18 feet long. It is also given two alternate names: Aohen (傲狠) and Nanxun (難訓).

== As a text ==
In his eponymous text, Mencius records Taowu as a record of the history of the State of Chu. This title would be mimicked by the Northern Song scholar Zhang Tangying (張唐英) in the text Shu Taowu (蜀檮杌), a history of the Later Shu dynasty.

== In popular culture ==
471325 Taowu

The trans-Neptunian object 471325 Taowu and a machairodont genus, Taowu liui, are named after Taowu.

Taowu is featured in the Shin Megami Tensei franchise, including Persona 4, Shin Megami Tensei: Devil Summoner, and Shin Megami Tensei IV, as a recruitable demon, using the description from the Book of Gods and Strange Things.
