= Qiongqi =

One of the Four Perils in Chinese mythology

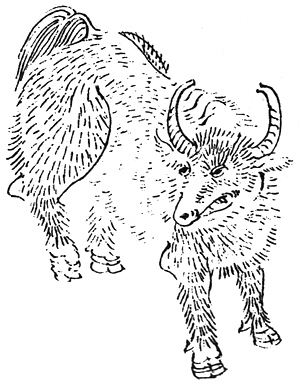
- Qing dynasty illustration from the Preface to the Classic of Mountains and Seas (山海經存) by Wang Fu (汪紱)
- Traditional Chinese: 窮奇
- Simplified Chinese: 穷奇
Transcriptions
Standard Mandarin
- Hanyu Pinyin: Qióngqí

Qiongqi is a mythical creature mentioned in the Chinese classics. Along with Hundun, Taowu, and Taotie, it is one of the Four Perils.

== Etymology ==
Qiongqi (窮奇) literally means "exhaustively strange".

== In traditional historiography ==
Qiongqi is mentioned in the Records of the Grand Historian as Shaohao's failed child, devoid of ability, who would act in bad faith, decry loyalty, and would speak only lies. Causing chaos across the Three Sovereigns and Five Emperors period, he would eventually be banished by Emperor Shun of the Youyu clan to the far reaches of the region. In the biographies, he also writes that it resides in a place called Yunmeng (雲夢) in the State of Chu. The Zuo Zhuan speaks to similar effect, but goes further, stating that the Qiongqi elevated lies, spread false accusations, and would stay quiet before slandering people.

=== In the Classic of Mountains and Seas ===
Qiongqi is given two conflicting descriptions in the Classic of Mountains and Seas.

The first is in the Classic of the Western Mountains (西山經):

又西二百六十里，曰邽山。其上有獸焉，其狀如牛，蝟毛，名曰窮奇，音如獋狗，是食人。
Two hundred and sixty li further west is Mount Gui. On it dwells a beast, resembling an ox with hedgehog-like fur, named Qiongqi, whose cry sounds like a howling dog; this (thing) eats people.

The second is in the Classic of the Northern Seas' Inner Realm (海內北經):

窮奇狀如虎，有翼，食人從首始，所食被髮，在蜪犬北。一曰從足。
Qiongqi resembles a tiger with wings. It eats people starting from the head, and those it eats have disheveled hair. It lives north of Taoquan. Another account says it starts from the feet.

The second account is embellished in the Book of Gods and Strange Things, which, in addition to the above description, also claims that Qiongqi understands human speech. If it hears people fighting, it will eat the one in the right, and if it hears one who is loyal and trustworthy, it will eat their nose. If it hears someone wicked, it will kill a beast to feed them. Outside of this, it also eats birds and beasts.

== In popular culture ==
Qiongqi is featured in the Shin Megami Tensei franchise, particularly the Devil Children games, as a recruitable demon, using the description from the Classic of the Northern Seas' Inner Realm (海內北經) of the Classic of Mountains and Seas.
