= Hundun =

Primordial and central chaos in Chinese cosmogony

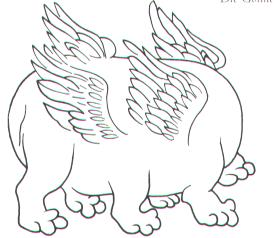
The faceless Sovereign Jiang (帝江) described in the Shanhaijing

Hundun (Chinese: 混沌; pinyin: Hùndùn; Wade–Giles: Hun^{4}-tun^{4}; lit. 'muddled confusion') is both a "legendary faceless being" in Chinese mythology and the "primordial and central chaos" in Chinese cosmogony, comparable with the world egg.

== Etymology ==
Hundun 混沌 was semantically extended from a mythic "primordial chaos; nebulous state of the universe before heaven and earth separated" to mean "unintelligible; chaotic; messy; mentally dense; innocent as a child". While hùndùn "primordial chaos" is usually written as 混沌 in contemporary sources, it is also written as 渾沌—as in the Daoist classic Zhuangzi—or 渾敦 —as in the Zuozhuan. Hùn "chaos; muddled; confused" is written either hùn (混; 'abundantly flowing', 'turbid water', 'torrent', 'mix up/in', 'confuse', 'thoughtless', 'senseless') or hún (渾; 'sound of running water', 'muddy', 'muddled', 'confused', 'dull', 'stupid'). These two are interchangeable graphic variants read as hún (混; 'muddy', 'dirty', 'filthy') (Note: See Mandarin slang húndàn (混蛋; 渾蛋; 'filthy egg'), meaning bastard or scumbag)) and hùn (渾; 'nebulous', 'stupid') (渾沌; hùndùn). Dùn ("dull; confused") is written as either dùn (沌; 'dull', 'confused', 'stupid') or dūn (敦; 'thick', 'solid', 'generous', 'earnest', 'honest', 'sincere').

Isabelle Robinet outlines the etymological origins of hundun.

Semantically, the term hundun is related to several expressions, hardly translatable in Western languages, that indicate the void or a barren and primal immensity – for instance, hunlun (混淪), hundong (混洞), kongdong (空洞), menghong (蒙洪), or hongyuan (洪元). It is also akin to the expression "something confused and yet complete" (混成; huncheng) found in the Daode jing 25, which denotes the state prior to the formation of the world where nothing is perceptible, but which nevertheless contains a cosmic seed. Similarly, the state of hundun is likened to an egg; in this usage, the term alludes to a complete world round and closed in itself, which is a receptacle like a cavern (洞; dong) or a gourd (壺; hu or 壺盧; hulu).

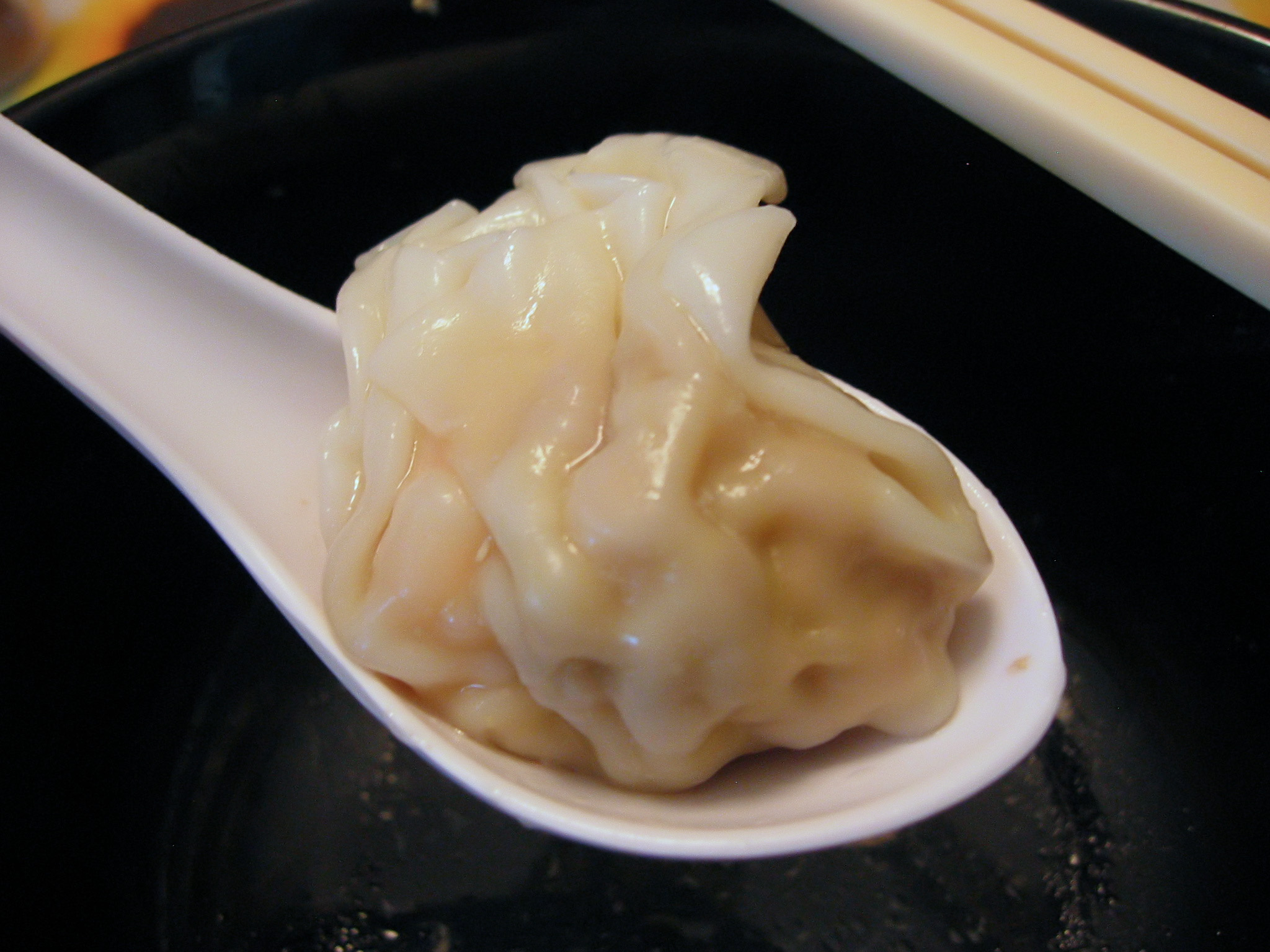
A shrimp wonton

Hùndùn "primordial chaos" is cognate with Wonton (餛飩; húntun) "wonton; dumpling soup" written with the "eat radical" 飠. Note that the English loanword wonton is borrowed from the Cantonese pronunciation wan^{4}tan^{1}. Victor H. Mair suggests a fundamental connection between hundun and wonton: "The undifferentiated soup of primordial chaos. As it begins to differentiate, dumpling-blobs of matter coalesce. … With the evolution of human consciousness and reflectiveness, the soup was adopted as a suitable metaphor for chaos". This last assertion appears unsupported, however, since wonton soup is not attested in Chinese sources dating earlier than the Han dynasty, although the linguistic connection of the soup to the larger concept certainly appears real.

== Early textual usages ==
In the Chinese written record, hundun first appears in classics dating from the Warring States period. The following summary divides them into Confucianist, Daoist, and other categories, and presents them in roughly chronological order, with the caveat that many early textual dates are uncertain.

=== Confucian texts ===
Hundun only occurs in one Confucian classic, the Zuo Zhuan commentary to the Spring and Autumn Annals. Most early Confucianist ancient texts (Lunyu, Book of Documents, I Ching, etc.) do not use hun, with four exceptions. One, the Mengzi, uses hun in its original meaning "sound of flowing water". Mencius explains why Confucius praised water, "There is a spring of water; how it gushes out!". The other three use hun as what Girardot calls "a term of opprobrium and condemnation related to the suppression of the "barbarians" or the "legendary rebels"."

The Shijing (237) mentions Hunyi (混夷) "ancient Hunni tribe in Turan". When King Wen of Zhou opened up the roads, "The hordes of the Keun [sic] disappeared, Startled and panting". The Chunqiu mentions the Luhun 陸渾 tribe of the Rong 戎 people, "the Jung of Luh-hwăn" The Zuozhuan commentary to the Chunqiu notes they were originally from western Gansu and forced into northern Henan.

Another Zuozhuan context refers to Hundun (渾敦) as a worthless son of the Yellow Emperor, one of the mythical Sixiong (四凶) "Four Perils" banished by Shun.

The ancient emperor Hung [Hwang-te] had a descendant devoid of ability [and virtue]. He hid righteousness from himself, and was a villain at heart; he delighted in the practice of the worst vices; he was shameless and vile, obstinate, stupid, and unfriendly, cultivating only the intimacy of such as himself. All the people under heaven called him Chaos. … When Shun became Yaou's minister, he received the nobles from the four quarters of the empire, and banished these four wicked ones, Chaos, Monster, Block, and Glutton, casting them out into the four distant regions, to meet the spite of the sprites and evil things.

The other "Perils" are Qiongqi, Taowu, and Taotie. Legge notes this passage "is worthy of careful study in many respects."

Girardot contrasts these rare Confucian usages of hundun pejoratively suggesting the forces thwarting civilization, "the "birds and beasts," barbarian tribes, banished ministers, and legendary rebels)" with the common Daoist usages in a "paradise lost theme".

=== Taoist texts ===
Hundun commonly occurs in classics of philosophical Taoism. The Daodejing does not mention hundun but uses both hun graphic variants. One section uses hun (渾; 'bemuddle'): "The sage is self-effacing in his dealings with all under heaven, and bemuddles his mind for the sake of all under heaven". Three other sections use hun (混; 'bound together', 'muddled', 'featureless'):

- "These three cannot be fully fathomed, Therefore, They are bound together to make unity".
- "plain, as an unhewn log, muddled, as turbid waters, expansive, as a broad valley"
- "There was something featureless yet complete, born before heaven and earth"

The Zhuangzi (ca. 3rd-2nd centuries BCE) has a famous parable involving emperors Hundun (渾沌), Shu (儵; 'a fish name', 'abrupt', 'quick'), and Hu (忽; 'ignore', 'neglect', 'sudden'). Girardot cites Marcel Granet on Shu and Hu synonymously meaning "suddenness; quickness" and "etymologically appear to be linked to the images of lightning and thunder, or analogously, flaming arrows." The "Heavenly Questions" chapter of the Chu Ci uses Shu and Hu as one name: "Where are the hornless dragons which carry bears on their backs for sport? Where is the great serpent with nine heads and where is the Shu-Hu?"

The emperor of the South Sea was called Shu [Brief], the emperor of the North Sea was called Hu [Sudden], and the emperor of the central region was called Hun-tun [Chaos]. Shu and Hu from time to time came together for a meeting in the territory of Hun-tun, and Hun-tun treated them very generously. Shu and Hu discussed how they could repay his kindness. "All men," they said, "have seven openings so they can see, hear, eat, and breathe. But Hun-tun alone doesn't have any. Let's trying boring him some!" Every day they bored another hole, and on the seventh day Hun-tun died.

Compare Watson's renderings of the three characters with other Zhuangzi translators.

- Change, Suddenness, Confusion (or Chaos) — Frederic H. Balfour
- Shû, Hû, Chaos — James Legge
- Change, Uncertainty, Primitivity — Yu-Lan Fung
- Shu, Hu, Hun Tun — Herbert Giles
- Immediately, Suddenly, Undifferentiation — James R. Ware
- Light, Darkness, Primal Chaos — Gia-Fu Feng and Jane English
- Fast, Furious, Hun-t'un — A.C. Graham
- Lickety, Split, Wonton — Victor H. Mair
- Change, Dramatic, Chaos — Martin Palmer
- Helter, Skelter, Chaos — Wang Rongpei

Two other Zhuangzi contexts use hundun. Chapter 11 has an allegory about Hong Meng 鴻蒙; "Big Concealment" or "Silly Goose", who "was amusing himself by slapping his thighs and hopping around like a sparrow", which Girardot interprets as shamanic dancing comparable with the Shanhaijing below. Hong Meng poetically reduplicates hunhun-dundun (渾渾沌沌; 'dark and undifferentiated chaos') in describing Daoist "mind-nourishment" meditation.

"You have only to rest in inaction and things will transform themselves. Smash your form and body, spit out hearing and eyesight, forget you are a thing among other things, and you may join in great unity with the deep and boundless. Undo the mind, slough off spirit, be blank and soulless, and the ten thousand things one by one will return to the root – return to the root and not know why. Dark and undifferentiated chaos – to the end of life none will depart from it. But if you try to know it, you have already departed from it. Do not ask what its name is, do not try to observe its form. Things will live naturally and of themselves."

Chapter 12 tells a story about the Confucian disciple Zigong becoming dumbfounded after meeting a Daoist sage. He reported back to Confucius, who denigrated Hundun Shi zhi shu (渾沌氏之術; "the arts of Mr. Chaos [Hundun]"):

"He is one of those bogus practitioners of the arts of Mr. Chaos. He knows the first thing but doesn't understand the second. He looks after what is on the inside but doesn't look after what is on the outside. A man of true brightness and purity who can enter into simplicity, who can return to the primitive through inaction, give body to his inborn nature, and embrace his spirit, and in this way wander through the everyday world – if you had met one like that, you would have had real cause for astonishment. As for the arts of Mr. Chaos, you and I need not bother to find out about them."

The Huainanzi has one occurrence of hundun (渾沌) in a cosmological description.

Heaven and earth were perfectly joined [tung-t'ung 洞同], all was chaotically unformed [hun-tun wei p'u 渾沌為樸]; and things were complete [ch'eng 成] yet not created. This is called [the time or condition] of the Great One. [t'ai-i 太一]. All came from this unity which gave to each thing its differences: the birds, fish, and beasts. This is called the lot [or division, fen 分] of things.

Three other Huainanzi chapters use hun, for example, the compound hunhun cangcang (渾渾蒼蒼; 'pure and unformed', 'vast and hazy')

The world was a unity without division into classes nor separation into orders (lit: a disorganised mass): the unaffectedness and homeliness of the natural heart had not, as yet, been corrupted: the spirit of the age was a unity, and all creation was in great affluence. Hence, if a man with the knowledge of I [羿 A mythical person of great powers] appeared, the world had no use for him.

The Liezi uses hunlun (渾淪) for hundun, which is described as the confused state in which qi (氣; 'pneuma', 'breath'), xing (形; 'form', 'shape'), and zhi (質; 'matter', 'substance') have begun to exist but are still merged as one.

There was a Primal Simplicity, there was a Primal Commencement, there were Primal Beginnings, there was a Primal Material. The Primal Simplicity preceded the appearance of the breath. The Primal Beginnings were the breath beginning to assume shape. The Primal Material was the breath when it began to assume substance. Breath, shape and substance were complete, but things were not yet separated from each other; hence the name "Confusion." "Confusion" means the myriad things were confounded and not yet separated from each other.

=== Other texts ===
The Shanhaijing collection of early myths and legends uses hundun (渾敦) as an adjective to describe a shen (神; 'spirit', 'god') on Tian Shan (天山; "Heaven Mountain").

There is a god here who looks like a yellow sack. He is scarlet like cinnabar fire. He has six feet and four wings. He is Muddle Thick. He has no face and no eyes. He knows how to sing and dance. He is in truth the great god Long River.

In the above passage, 渾敦 is translated as "Muddle Thick", and the name of the god Di-Jiang (帝江) is translated as "great god Long River". Toshihiko Izutsu suggests that singing and dancing here and in Zhuangzi refers to shamanic trance-inducing ceremonies, "the monster is said to be a bird, which is most probably an indication that the shamanistic dancing here in question was some kind of feather dance in which the shaman was ritually ornamented with a feathered headdress."

The Shen yi jing (神異經; "Classic of Divine Wonders") records a later variation of Hundun mythology. It describes him as a divine dog who lived on Mt. Kunlun, the mythical mountain at the center of the world.

It has eyes but can't see, walks without moving; and has two ears but can't hear. It has the knowledge of a man yet its belly is without the five internal organs and, although having a rectum, it doesn't evacuate food. It punches virtuous men and stays with the non-virtuous. It is called. Hun-tun.

Quoting the Zuo Zhuan, Hun-tun was Meng-shih's untalented son. He always gnaws his tail, going round and round. Everyone ridiculed him.

A poem in the Tang dynasty collection Hanshan refers to the Zhuangzi myth and reminisces about Hundun.

How pleasant were our bodies in the days of Chaos, Needing neither to eat or piss! Who came along with his drill And bored us full of these nine holes? Morning after morning we must dress and eat; Year after year, fret over taxes. A thousand of us scrambling for a penny, We knock our heads together and yell for dear life.

Note the addition of two holes (anus and penis) to the original seven (eyes, ears, nostrils, and mouth).

== Interpretations ==
Hundun myths have a complex history, with many variations on the "primordial chaos" theme and associations with other legends.

The sociologist and historian Wolfram Eberhard analyzed the range of various hundun myths. He treated it as a world egg mythic "chain" from the southern Liao culture, which originated in the Sichuan and Hubei region.

1. Hundun creation myths involving humanity being born from a "thunder-egg" or lump of flesh, the son of an emperor, the Thunder god represented as a dog with bat wings, localized with the Miao people and Tai peoples.
2. The animal Lei (Note: The character for lei combines the dog radical 犭 with a lei (雷; 'thunder') phonetic) "is a creature like a lump, without head, eyes, hands, or feet. At midnight it produces noises like thunder."
3. The hundun dumplings, etymologically connected with "round", "unorganized; chaotic", and perhaps the "round mountain" Kunlun.
4. The world-system huntian 渾天 in ancient Chinese astronomy conceptualized the universe as a round egg and the earth as a yolk swimming within it.
5. The sack and the shooting of the god connects sack-like descriptions of hundun, perhaps with "sack" denoting "testicles", legends about Shang dynasty king Wu Yi who lost a game of chess with the god Heaven and suspended a sack filled with blood and shot arrows at it, and later traditions of shooting at human dolls.
6. Pangu (盤古) is the mythological creator of the universe, also supposedly shaped like a sack, connected with dog mythologies, and who grew into a giant in order to separate Heaven and Earth.
7. Heaven and earth as marital partners within the world-egg refers to the theme of Sky father and Earth Mother goddess.
8. Zhongli (重黎/融黎) is identified with Zhu Rong 祝融 "god of fire", which is a mythology from the southern state Chu, with variations appearing as two gods Zhong and Li.
9. Zhongli (重黎) clan, which has variant writings, originated in the Ba (state), near present-day Anhui.
10. The brother-sister marriage is a complex of myths explaining the origins or mankind (or certain families), and their first child is usually a lump of flesh, which falls into pieces and populates the world. In later mythology, the brother Fu Xi and sister Nüwa, who lived on Mt. Kunlun, exemplify this marriage.

Norman J. Girardot, professor of Chinese religion at Lehigh University, has written articles and a definitive book on hundun. He summarizes this mythology as follows.

1. The hun-tun theme in early Taoism represents an ensemble of mythic elements coming from different cultural and religious situations.
2. The symbolic coherence of the hun-tun theme in the Taoist texts basically reflects a creative reworking of a limited set of interrelated mythological typologies: especially the cosmic egg-gourd, the animal ancestor-cosmic giant, and primordial couple mythologies. The last two of these typologies are especially, although not exclusively, linked to what may be called the deluge cycle of mythology found primarily in southern local cultures.
3. While there may also be a cultural connection between the southern deluge cycle and the cosmogonic scenario of the cosmic egg (i.e., via the "thunder-egg," "origin of ancestors [culture hero] from egg or gourd," and "origin of agriculture and mankind from gourd" myths), the fundamental linkage for all these typologies is the early Taoist, innovative perception of a shared symbolic intention that accounts for, and supports, a particular cosmogonic, metaphysical, and mystical vision of creation and life.

Interpretations of Hundun have expanded from "primordial chaos" into other realms. For instance, it is a keyword in Neidan "Chinese internal alchemy". explains that "Alchemists begin their work by "opening" or "boring" hundun; in other words, they begin from the Origin, infusing its transcendent element of precosmic light into the cosmos in order to reshape it."

== In popular culture ==
In the 2013 film Pacific Rim, the second kaiju to make landfall was named Hundun, though only a brief glimpse of it is seen and it doesn't have a major role in the plot. However, concept art of the film does show it with a rounded body akin to the mythological Hundun.

In the Marvel Cinematic Universe movie Shang-Chi and the Legend of the Ten Rings, the character Morris (vocal effects provided by Dee Bradley Baker) is a Hundun and acts as a companion of Trevor Slattery at the time when he was a jester for Wenwu. As Morris entered Ta Lo in a car with Shang-Chi, Xialing, Katy, and Trevor Slattery, he appeared excited to see other Hunduns and they waved their wings at each other.

A Hundun is featured as an optional final boss in the video game Spelunky 2. In the game, Hundun takes the form of a large egg with two legs, two wings, a snake head, a bird head, and a large eye in the center of the egg. Hundun's interpretation in Spelunky 2 is comparable to a world egg, as his body contains the final and largest world of the game.

The Hundun is referenced in episode 11 and 12 of the anime Lazarus.

In MiHoYo's mobile game Tears of Themis, Artem Wing was referred to as Hundun in "Omni-Spirits Bureau: Dark Fates". A small Hundun can also be seen in the "Super Adorable Demon" profile ornament.

In the Manhua and Donghua, You Shou Yan (有兽焉), Hundun of Mythology has 2 Counterparts. Within the story, both characters are depicted as Soulmates for each other.

- Hundun (混沌) is a Blue and Pink Sphinx-like canid creature who is blind and deaf. She has a clueless and nonchalant personality but develops a caring and protective personality after forming a family with the pixiu brothers, Tianlu and Bixie, and Dijiang. This counterpart of hundun was part of the Four Perils in the story.
- Dijiang (帝江) is the accurate looking counterpart of the two, having a Red furry balled body. Dijiang has a "gentle soul", who protects the people she calls Family, being the pixiu brothers and Hundun.

In the Age of Mythology: Retold downloadable content Immortal Pillars, the Hundun is a form of mythical creature recruitable by the Chinese pantheon under Huangdi.

== See also ==
- Chaos (cosmogony) – bearing the similar name (both meaning "chaos" in Modern English) and appearing in the mythological primordial era
- The Death of Hundun in the Zhuangzi
- Hongjun Laozu
- Tao
- Four Perils
- Tohu wa-bohu

== Sources ==
- Anderson, E. N. (1988). The Food of China. Yale. ISBN 9780300039559.
- The Classic of Mountains and Seas. Translated by Birrell, Anne. Penguin Classics. 2000.
- Eberhard, Wolfram (1968). The Local Cultures of South and East China. E.J. Brill. OCLC 1006434315.
- Girardot, Norman J. (1983). Myth and Meaning in Early Taoism: The Theme of Chaos (Hun-Tun). University of California Press.
- The Book of Lieh-tzǔ: A Classic of Tao. Translated by Graham, Angus C. New York: Columbia University Press. 1990. ISBN 9780231072373.
- Hawkes, David (1985). The Songs of the South: An Anthology of Ancient Chinese Poems by Qu Yuan and Other Poets. Penguin. ISBN 9780140443752.
- Izutsu, Toshihiko (1967). A comparative study of the key philosophical concepts in Sufism and Taoism: ibn 'Arabi and Lao-Tzu, Chuang-Tzu. Tokyo: The Keio Institute of Cultural and Linguistic Studies. OCLC 610228440.
- Legge, James (1872). The Chinese Classics. Vol. 5 vols. Trubner.
- Mair, Victor H. (1990). Tao Te Ching: The Classic Book of Integrity and the Way, by Lao Tzu; an entirely new translation based on the recently discovered Ma-wang-tui manuscripts. Bantam Books. ISBN 9780553070057.
- Mair, Victor H. (September 1994). "Introduction and Notes for a Complete Translation of the Chuang Tzu" (PDF). Sino-Platonic Papers. 48.
- Mair, Victor H. (1998). Wandering on the way: Early Daoist tales and parables of Chuang Tzu. New York: Bantam Books. ISBN 9780824820381.
- Tao, the Great Luminant: Essays from the Huai Nan Tzu. Translated by Morgan, Evan S. Kelly and Walsh. 1934.
- Robinet, Isabelle (2007). "Hundun 混沌 Chaos; inchoate state". In Pregadio, Fabrizio (ed.). The Encyclopedia of Taoism. Routledge. pp. 523–525.
- The Complete works of Chuang Tzu. Translated by Watson, Burton. Columbia University Press. 1968. OCLC 327431524.
- Han-shan (1970) [c. 650]. Cold Mountain: 100 Poems. Translated by Watson, Burton. Columbia University Press. ISBN 9780231034500.
- Yu, David C. (1981). "The Creation Myth and Its Symbolism in Classical Taoism". Philosophy East and West. 31 (4). University of Hawai'i Press: 481. doi:10.2307/1398794. ISSN 0031-8221. JSTOR 1398794.
- You Shou Yan (有兽焉) (2017)
