= Huodou =

Legendary creature of China

Huodou (simplified Chinese: 祸斗; traditional Chinese: 禍斗; pinyin: Huòdǒu) is a legendary creature originating within the minorities of southern China.

== Appearance ==
It is described as having the appearance of a large black dog that can emit flames from its mouth. Fire would break out wherever the Huodou went, so the ancients saw it as a sign of fire and often an ominous symbol. It is probably a demonized tribal symbol of southern China.

The "Shanhaijing" states: "There are people and beasts in the south who eat fire. Their country is near Hei Kunlun (Black Kunlun). People there can eat coals, and fire-eating beasts are also known as Calamities." The Shanhaijing also mentioned that the body of the Huodou is black.

It is also noted in the Chiya (赤雅) of the Ming Dynasty: "the Huodou looks like a dog, it eats fire and spits fire, it is ominous".
