= Book of Gods and Strange Things =

Ancient Chinese geography book

Inside a page of a printed edition of Shenyi Jing

Book of Gods and Strange Things or Shenyi Jing (Chinese: 神異經) is an ancient Chinese geography book. The original version was written by Dongfang Shuo during the Han dynasty. The modern versions were edited by Zhang Hua during the Jin dynasty and Zhu Mouhan during the Ming dynasty.

The claim that Dongfang Shuo wrote the Book of Gods and Strange Things was first recorded by Pei Songzhi in the Records of the Three Kingdoms in the footnotes.
