= Four Criminals =

Four malicious individuals in Chinese mythology

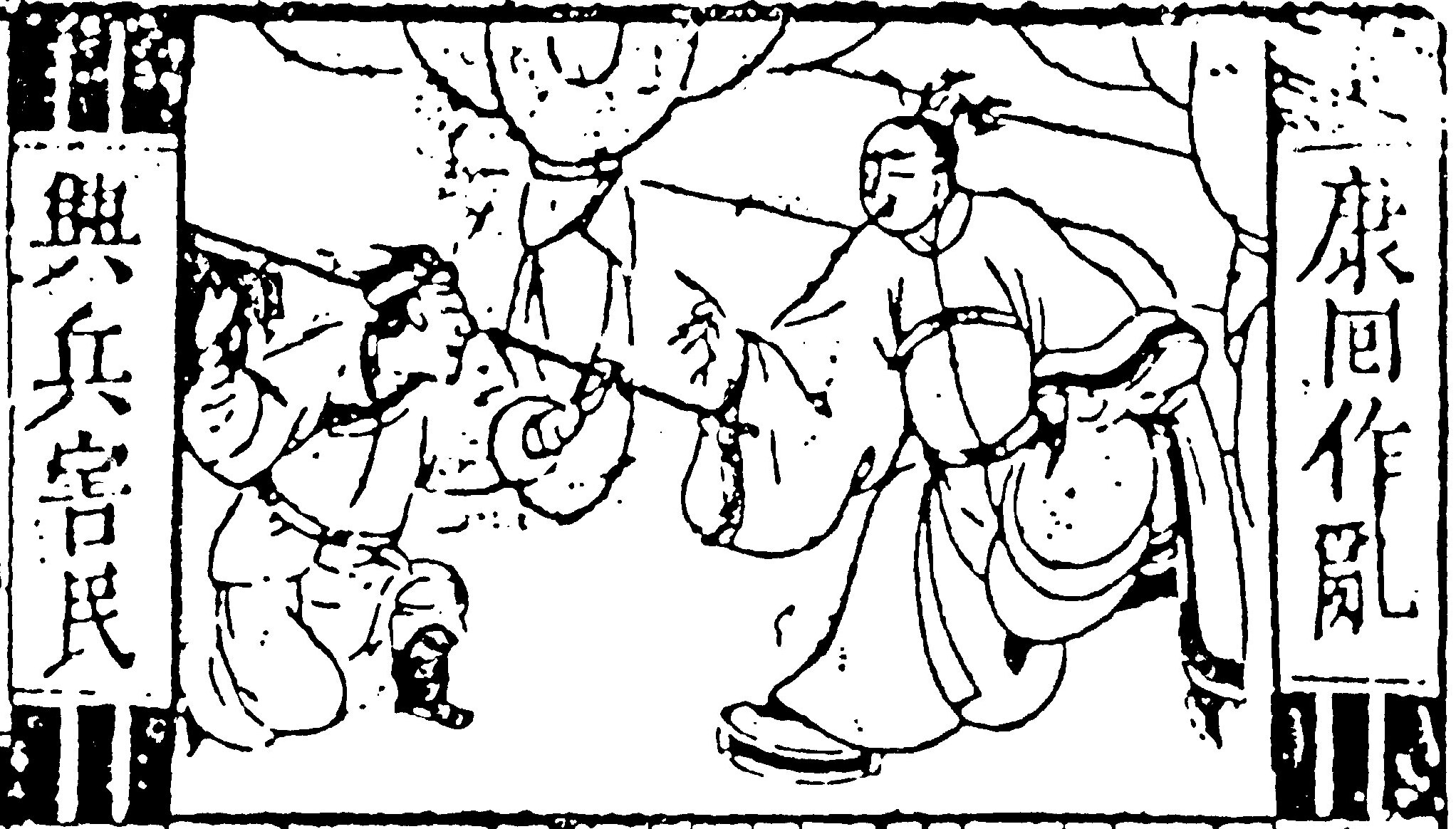
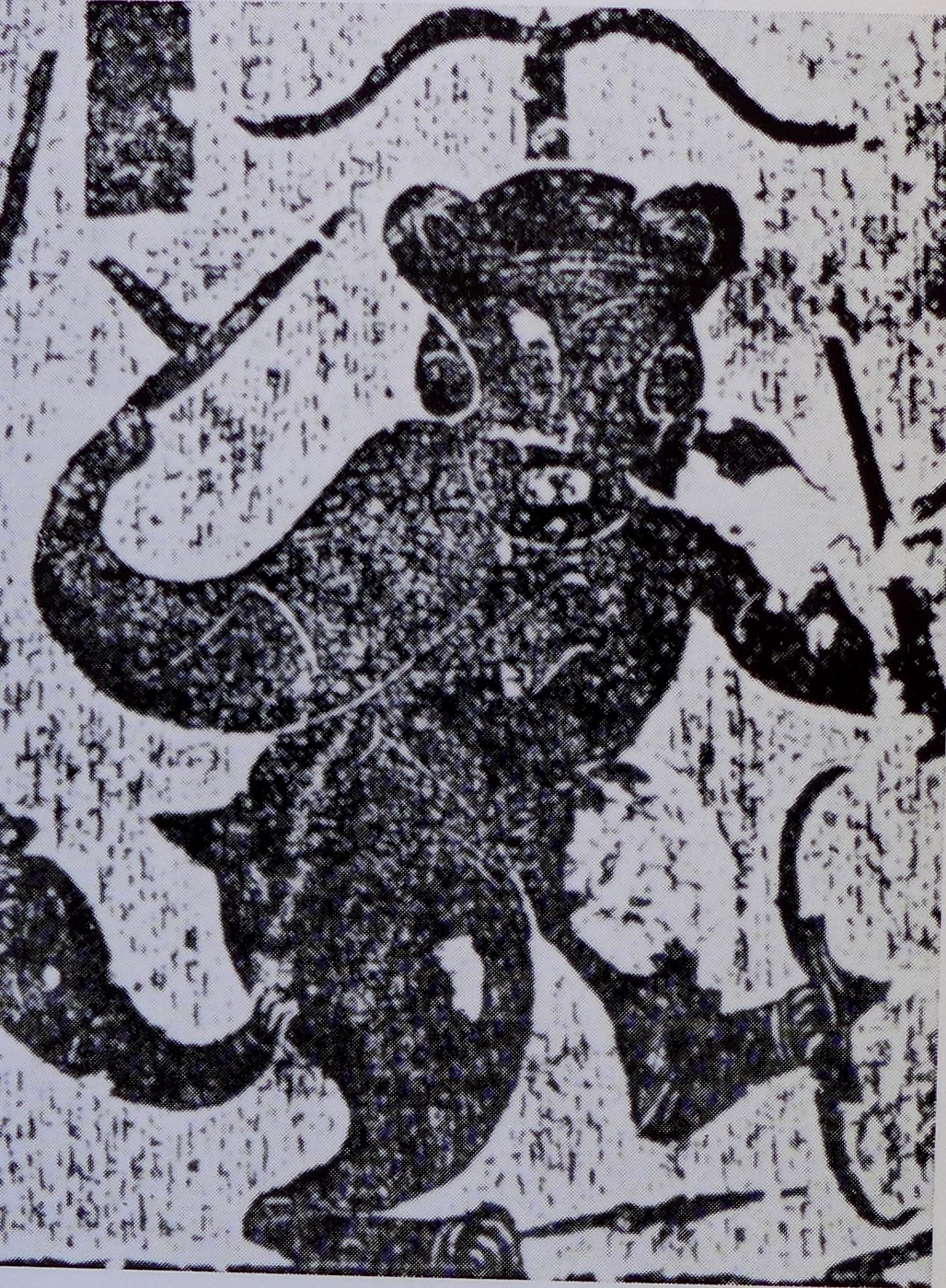
- Clockwise: Huandou as seen in the Classic of Mountains and Seas, Gonggong at war with Zhurong, Gun in small seal script, and Chi You, the progenitor of the Sanmiao tribe.

Chinese name
- Chinese: 四罪
- Literal meaning: Four Evildoers; Four Criminals
Transcriptions
Standard Mandarin
- Hanyu Pinyin: Sì Zuì

Japanese name
- Kanji: 四罪
- Hiragana: しざい
Transcriptions
- Romanization: Shizai

The Four Criminals (四罪) are a semi-legendary group of individuals who allegedly caused significant hardship for the Youyu clan during the Three Sovereigns and Five Emperors period of Chinese history. They are mentioned prominently in the Book of Documents.

== In the Book of Documents ==
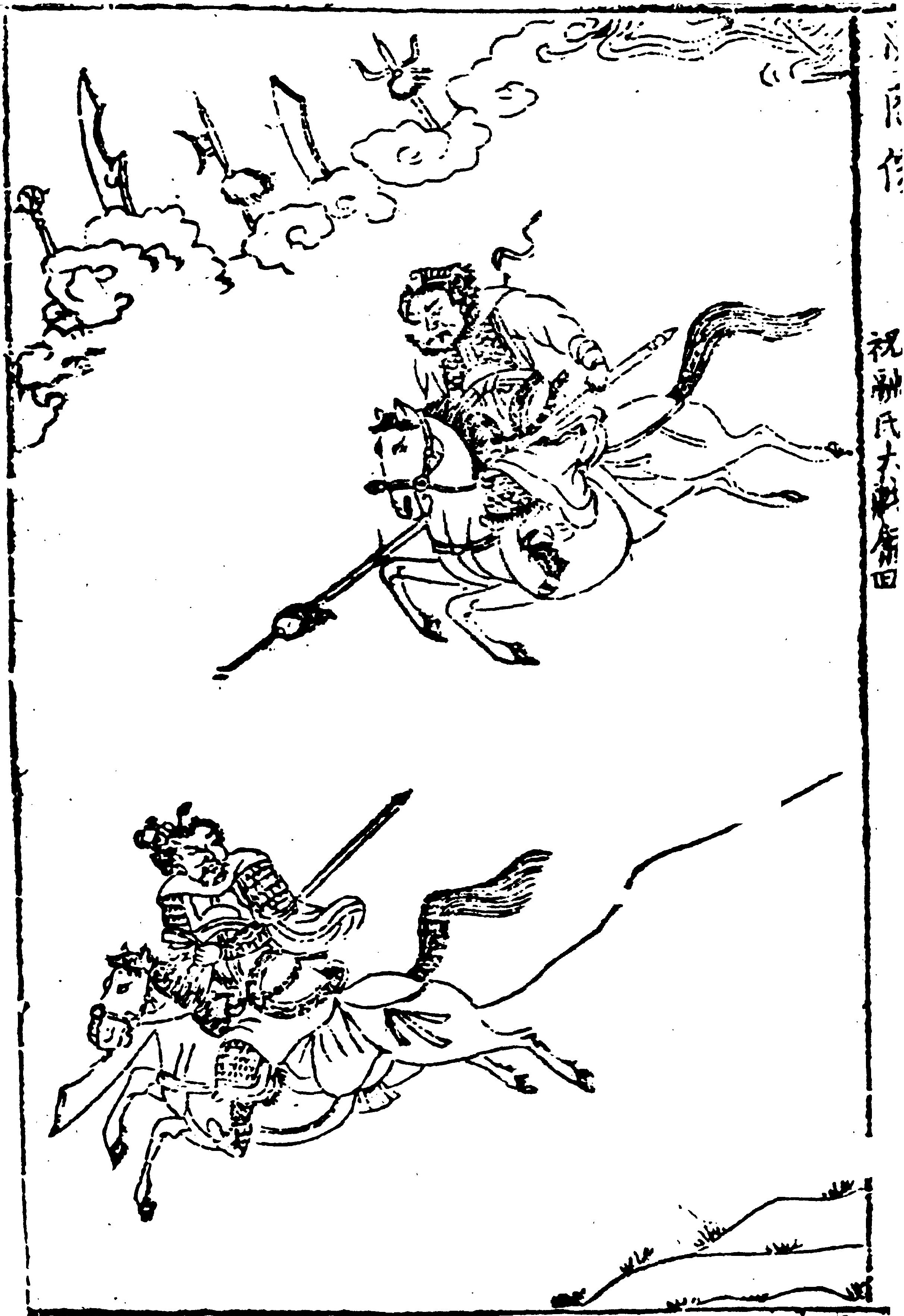
Zhurong at war with Gonggong.

The Four Criminals (四罪; Sì Zuì) are a set of individuals who caused great trouble for the rule of Emperor Yao of the Taotang clan and Emperor Shun of the Youyu clan. Three of the criminals are of the Sanmiao tribe: Huandou, Gonggong, and the tribe itself. The last criminal, Gun, was of the Youxia clan. Gun's son, Yu the Great, would go on to found the Xia dynasty with the Youxia clan, having fulfilled his father's legacy of controlling the floods.

According to the Bamboo Annals, Gonggong was the first of several individuals tasked with managing the Great Flood. This occurred during Emperor Yao's 19th year. He failed, and this forced Yao to consult the Four Mountains for advice. According to the Canon of Yao in the Book of Documents, Huandou was seemingly surprised at the inadequacy of Gonggong, and Gun was recommended instead. Yao begrudgingly agreed, and so Gun went to manage the cataclysm. After nine years, no progress was made. His son, Yu, would be recommended to finish the job, and succeeded, thus being named Yu the Great. Gonggong and Gun would be exiled far away from Emperor Yao's territory for their incompetence. In response, Huandou would rebel against the Taotang and Youyu clan's increasing influence over the region, which resulted in him being defeated several times by Yu the Great during Emperor Shun's reign, which would put an end to the Sanmiao tribe. After this, the three, and the broader tribe, would be labelled as the Four Criminals.

== Identification ==
Zhang Shoujie's Correct Meanings of the Record of the Grand Historian (史記正義; Shǐjì Zhèngyì) identifies Huandou with Hundun, Gonggong with Qiongqi, Gun with Taowu, and the Sanmiao with Taotie.

== See also ==
- Four Barbarians
- Four Horsemen of the Apocalypse
- Four Perils
- Yuwang
