= Yinglong =

Water deity in Chinese mythology

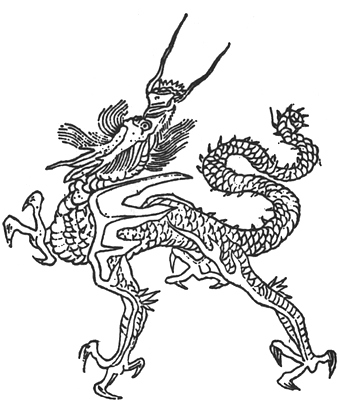
- Yinglong illustration from the Classic of Mountains and Seas

Chinese name
- Traditional Chinese: 應龍
- Simplified Chinese: 应龙
- Literal meaning: Responsive dragon
Transcriptions
Standard Mandarin
- Hanyu Pinyin: Yìnglóng

Korean name
- Hangul: 응룡
- Hanja: 應龍
Transcriptions
- Revised Romanization: Eunglyong
- McCune–Reischauer: Ŭngryong

Japanese name
- Kanji: 応竜 応龍 應竜 應龍
- Hiragana: おうりゅう
Transcriptions
- Romanization: Ōryū

Yinglong (traditional Chinese: 應龍; simplified Chinese: 应龙; pinyin: yìnglóng; lit. 'responsive dragon') is a winged dragon and rain deity in ancient Chinese mythology.

== Name ==
This legendary creature's name combines yìng 應 "respond; correspond; answer; reply; agree; comply; consent; promise; adapt; apply" and lóng 龍 "Chinese dragon". Although the former character is also pronounced (with a different tone) yīng 應 "should; ought to; need to; proper; suitable", yinglong 應龍 definitively means "responsive dragon; responding dragon" and not "proper dragon".

== Classical usages ==
The Chinese classics frequently mention yinglong 應龍 "a winged rain-dragon" in myths about the Three Sovereigns and Five Emperors, especially the Yellow Emperor and his alleged descendant King Yu. The examples below, limited to books with English translations, are roughly arranged in chronological order, although some heterogeneous texts have uncertain dates of composition.

=== Chuci ===
The (3rd–2nd centuries BCE) Chu Ci "Songs of Chu" mentions Yinglong helping King Yu 禹, the legendary founder of the Xia dynasty, to control the mythic Great Deluge. According to Chinese mythology, Emperor Yao 堯 assigned Yu's father Gun 鯀, who was supposedly a descendant of the Yellow Emperor, to control massive flooding, but he failed. Yao's successor, Emperor Shun 舜, had Gun executed and his body exposed, but when Gun's corpse did not decompose, it was cut open and Yu was born by parthenogenesis. Shun appointed Yu to control the floods, and after succeeding through diligently constructing canals, Yu divided ancient China into the Nine Provinces.

The Heavenly Questions section (3, 天問) asks about Yinglong, in context with Zhulong 燭龍 "Torch Dragon". Tianwen, which Hawkes characterizes as "a shamanistic catechism consisting of questions about cosmological, astronomical, mythological and historical matters", and "is written in an archaic language to be found nowhere else in the Chu anthology" excepting "one or two short passages" in the Li Sao section.

When Lord Gun brought forth Yu from his belly, how was he transformed? Yu inherited the same tradition and carried on the work of his father. If he continued the work already begun, in what way was his plan a different one? How did he fill the flood waters up where they were most deep? How did he set bounds to the Nine Lands? What did the winged dragon trace on the ground? Where did the seas and rivers flow?

The (early second century CE) Chuci commentary of Wang Yi 王逸 answers that Yinglong drew lines on the ground to show Yu where to dig drainage and irrigation canals.

=== Classic of Mountains and Seas ===
The (c. 4th century BCE – 1st century CE) Classic of Mountains and Seas 山海經 records variant Yinglong myths in two chapters of "The Classic of the Great Wilderness" section. The dragon is connected with two deities who rebelled against the Yellow Emperor: the war-god and rain-god Chiyou 蚩尤 and the giant Kua Fu 夸父.

"Great Eastern Wastelands" (14, 大荒東經) mentions Yinglong killing both Chiyou and Kua Fu and describes using Yinglong images in sympathetic magic for rainmaking.

A dragon called Yinglong lived on the southern flank of a mountain named Xiongli Hill in the northeast corner of the Great Wasteland...having killed celestial beings Chiyou and Kuafu...Yinglong could not return to heaven. With no Yinglong, who created clouds and rain, the people below suffered constant droughts. When that happened, they masqueraded as Yinglong or fashioned clay images of the dragon to bring rain, often successfully.

Guo Pu's (early 4th century CE) commentary mentions tulong 土龍 (lit. 'earth/clay dragon'): "The earthen dragons of the present day find their origin in this."

"Great Northern Wastelands" (17, 大荒北經) mentions Yinglong in two myths. The first says Yinglong killed Kua Fu in punishment for drinking rivers and creating droughts while chasing the sun.

In the middle of the Great Wilderness there is a mountain. Its name is [成都載天] Mount Successcity-carriesthesky. There is someone on this mountain. His ear ornaments are two yellow snakes, and he is holding two yellow snakes. His name is Boast Father [Kua Fu]. Sovereign Earth gave birth to Faith. Faith gave birth to Boast Father. Boast Father's strength knew no bounds. He longed to race against the light of the sun. He caught up with it at Ape Valley. He scooped some water from the great River to drink, but it wasn't enough. He ran towards Big Marsh, but just before he reached it, he died here by this mountain. Responding Dragon [Yinglong] had already killed Jest Much [Chiyou], and now he also killed Boast Father. Then Responding Dragon left for the southern region and settled there. That is why there is so much rain in the southern region.

The second myth says Yinglong failed to kill Chiyou, so the Yellow Emperor sought the aid of his daughter Nüba or Ba 魃 who, like Kua Fu, is associated with drought.

Back when the Yellow Emperor and Chiyou were in conflict, Chiyou fabricated many different weapons to attack the Yellow Emperor. The emperor sent Yinglong to the plains of Jizhou to fight off the attacker. He gathered up vast quantities of water, but Chiyou called for the gods of wind and rain to raise a violent storm...So the Yellow Emperor enlisted the help of his daughter, a Heavenly Maiden whose name was Ba... She quickly stopped the rainstorm, creating an opportunity for the Yellow Emperor to kill Chiyou. But she was too exhausted to return to heaven and was given to roaming the human world, causing drought wherever she went.

Based on textual history of Yinglong, Chiyou, Kua Fu, and related legends, Bernhard Karlgren concludes that "all these nature myths are purely Han-time lore, and there is no trace of them in pre-Han sources", with two exceptions. Ba, who is "a very old folk-lore figure", already occurs in the c. Spring and Autumn period Classic of Poetry, and Yinglong, "who directed the flow of rivers and seas", occurs in the c. Warring States period Tianwen.

=== Huainanzi ===
The (2nd century BCE) Huainanzi uses Yinglong 應龍 in three chapters. Ying also occurs in ganying 感應 (lit. "sensation and response") "resonance; reaction; interaction; influence; induction", which Charles Le Blanc posits as the Huannanzi text's central and pivotal idea.

"Forms of Earth" (4, 墬形訓) explains how animal evolution originated through dragons, with Yinglong as the progenitor of quadrupeds. Carr notes this Responsive Dragon is usually pictured with four wings, perhaps paralleling four legs.

All creatures, winged, hairy, scaly and mailed, find their origin in the dragon. The yu-kia (羽嘉) produced the flying dragon, the flying dragon gave birth to the phoenixes, and after them the luan-niao (鸞鳥) and all birds, in general the winged beings, were born successively. The mao-tuh (毛犢, "hairy calf") produced the ying-lung (應龍), the ying-lung gave birth to the kien-ma (建馬), and afterwards the k'i-lin (麒麟) and all quadrupeds, in general the hairy beings, were born successively. …

Wolfram Eberhard suggests this "otherwise unknown" maodu "hairy calf" alludes to the "water buffalo".

"Peering into the Obscure" (6, 覽冥訓) describes Fuxi and Nüwa being transported by yinglong 應龍 and qingqiu 青虯 "green qiu-dragons", while accompanied by baichi 白螭 "white chi-dragons" and benshe 奔蛇 "speeding snakes".

They rode the thunder chariot, using winged dragons as the inner pair and green dragons as the outer pair. They clasped the magic jade tablets and displayed their charts. Yellow clouds hung inter-woven (to form a coverlet over the chariot) and they (the whole retinue) were preceded by white serpents and followed by speeding snakes.

Gao Yu's (2nd century CE) Huainanzi commentary glosses yinglong 應龍 as a "winged dragon" and qiu 虯 as a "hornless dragon".

"The Art of Rulership" (9, 主術訓) parallels the yinglong with the tengshe 騰蛇 "soaring snake" dragon. "The t'eng snake springs up into the mist; the flying ying dragon ascends into the sky mounting the clouds; a monkey is nimble in the trees and a fish is agile in the water." Ames compares the Hanfeizi attribution of this yinglong and tengshe metaphor to the Legalist philosopher Shen Dao.

Shen Tzu said: "The flying dragon mounts the clouds and the t'eng snake wanders in the mists. But when the clouds dissipate and the mists clear, the dragon and the snake become the same as the earthworm and the large-winged black ant because they have lost that on which they ride.

=== Other texts ===
Yinglong occurs in various additional Chinese texts. For instance, the Records of the Grand Historian, Book of Han, and Book of the Later Han histories.

The early third century CE Guangya dictionary defines yinglong "winged dragon" as one of the principal dragons. "If a dragon has scales, he is called jiaolong [蛟龍]; if wings, yinglong (應龍); if a horn, qiulung (虯龍); and if he has no horn, he is called qilong (螭龍)".

The early sixth century CE Shuyiji 述異記 "Records of Strange Things" lists yinglong as a 1000-year-old dragon. "A water snake (水虺 shui hui) after five hundred years changes into a jiao (蛟), a jiao after a thousand years changes into a long (龍), a long after five hundred years changes into a jiulong (蛟龍, "horned dragon") and after a thousand years into a yinglong (應龍)".

In the Book of the Later Han, Yinglong was connected as a companion to Nüba in the myth. They fought simultaneously against Chiyou's forces. This relationship led to the mythological romance of Nüba and Yinglong in later centuries.

== Comparative mythology ==
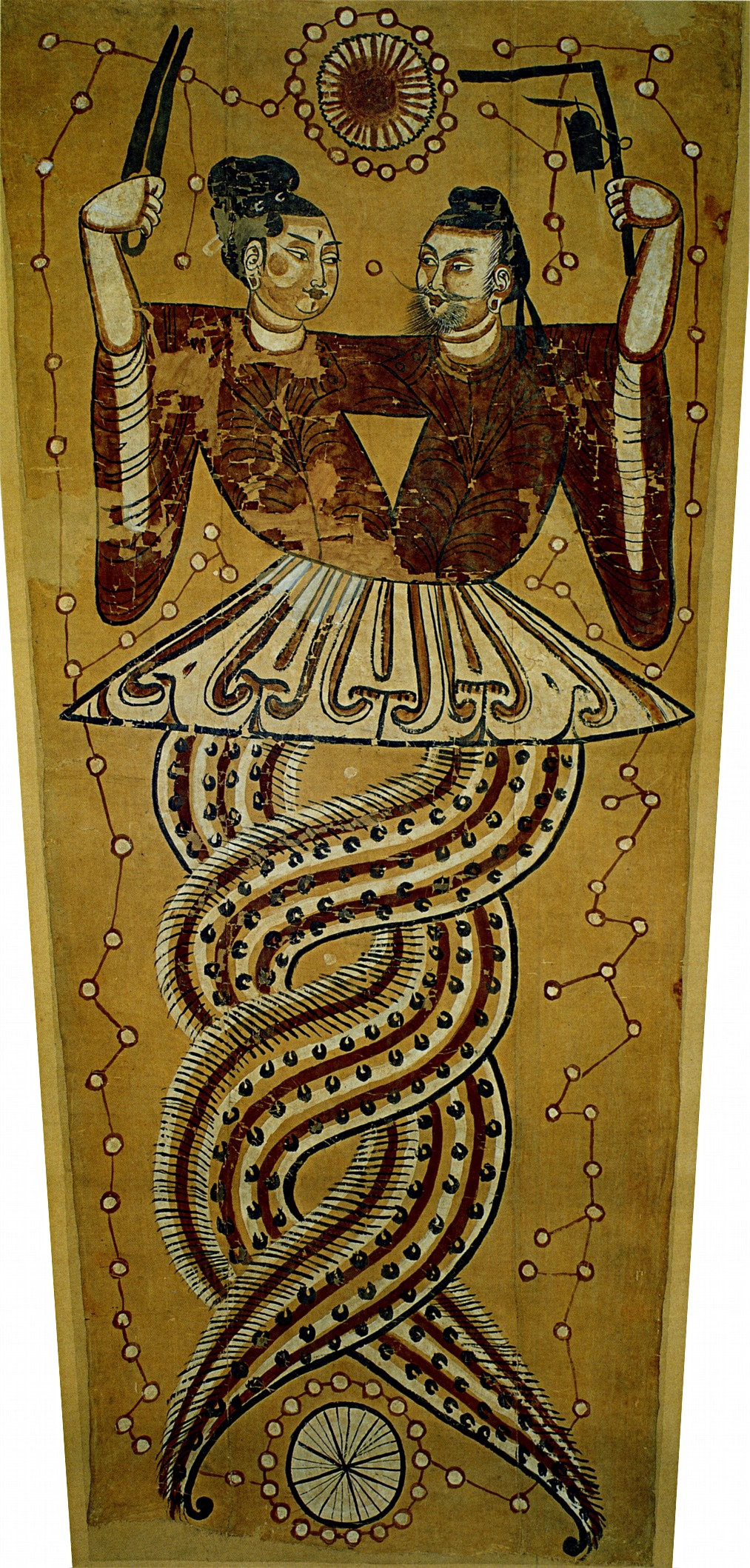
Ancient tomb painting of Fuxi and Nüwa

The yinglong mythically relates with other Chinese flying dragons and rain deities such as the tianlong ("heavenly dragon"), feilong ("flying dragon"), hong ("rainbow dragon"), and jiao ("flood dragon").

=== Flying dragons ===
Visser mentions that texts like the Daoist Liexian Zhuan often record "flying dragons or ying-lung drawing the cars of gods or holy men". Besides the Huainanzi (above) mentioning a pair of yinglong pulling the chariot of Fuxi and Nüwa, analogous examples include legends of Huangdi ascending to heaven on a dragon (Shiji) and Yu riding a carriage drawn by two flying dragons (Bowuzhi). Carr compares pairs of Yinglong with motifs on Chinese bronzes showing two symmetrical dragons intertwined like Fuxi and Nüwa.

Porter interprets the tail of the terrestrial Yinglong, which "uses its tail to sketch on the land a map of channel-like formations whereby the floodwaters were allowed to drain", as the tail of the celestial dragon Scorpius, which is "situated precisely where the Milky Way splits into two branches". The (4th century CE) Shiyiji 拾遺記 retells the Yu flood-control myth in terms of the Four Symbols, namely, the Yellow Dragon or Azure Dragon and the Black Tortoise. "Yü exhausted his energy creating channels, diverting the waters and establishing mountains as the yellow dragon dragged its tail in front and the black turtle carried green-black mud (used to build the channels) in back."

=== Rain dragons ===
Eberhard wrote that "All traditions about Ying-lung are vague". Although the legendary Yinglong dragon helped Yu to control floods, "Yü was frequently bothered by dragons", most notably the flood-deity Gonggong's minister Xiangliu 相柳. Eberhard, based on Sun Jiayi's identification of Xiangliu as an eel, concludes that Yinglong was an eel as well:

Sun points out that the eel is an important important animal in the flood tales of Formosan aborigines. Ying-lung, who ... made the beds of rivers by waggling his tail in the muddy soil and thus helped Yü to regulate the flood, was a kind of eel, too: Hsiang-liu [Xiangliu] stopped the water with his body; Ying-lung with his tail made it run freely, just as Yü's father Kun stopped the water, while Yü made it run. Kun who, according to legend, was executed for his inability to stop the flood, turned into a "dark fish"; and some texts call Kun "The naked one". Both names fit quite well the eel.

— Eberhard 1968, pp. 350–351, parenthetical comments omitted

Eberhard concludes that Yinglong and the mythic elements about Yu "testify to the connection between Yü and the cultures of the south, which differ from Yü myths of the Ba culture". Carr cites Chen Mengjia's hypothesis, based on studies of Shang dynasty oracle bones, that Yinglong was originally associated with the niqiu 泥鰍 "loach".

Yinglong representations were anciently used in rain-magic ceremonies, where Eberhard says "the most important animal is always a dragon made of clay". Besides controlling rain and drought, the Yinglong Responsive Dragon did something else: "With his tail he drew lines in the earth and thus created the rivers … In other words, the dragon made the waterways – the most important thing for all cultivators of rice.

== In popular culture ==
In Wolong Fallen Dynasty: Yinglong is a legendary Divine Beast who is hosted in Zhuge Liang the genius strategist of Shu Han who is famously known as the Crouching Dragon

In the game Limbus Company, Yinglong can be fought as a boss in Refraction Railway 6.
