= Xiangliu (moon) =

Moon of the dwarf planet Gonggong

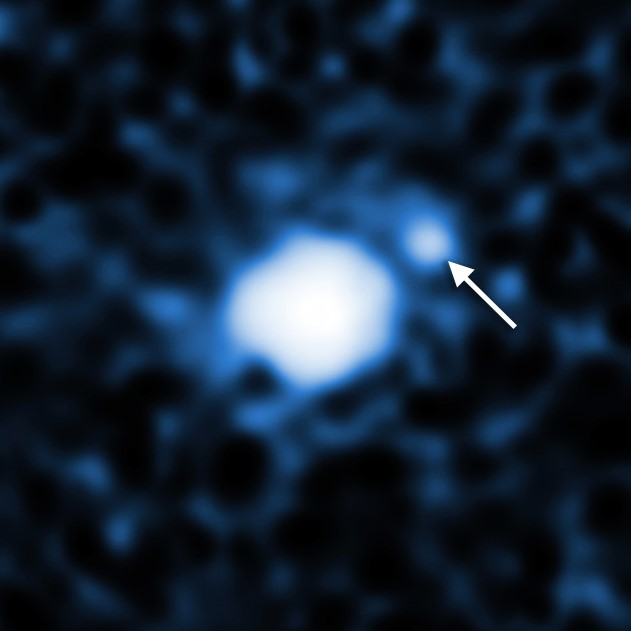
- Gonggong and Xiangliu (pointed at by arrow) imaged by the Hubble Space Telescope in 2010

Discovery
- Discovered by: Gábor Marton; Csaba Kiss; Thomas Müller
- Discovery date: 18 September 2010 (first identified) (announced 17 October 2016)

Designations
- Pronunciation: /ʃæŋ.ljuː/ SHANG-LEW
- Named after: 相柳 Xiāngliǔ

Orbital characteristics
- Epoch 8 December 2014 (JD 2457000.0)
- Semi-major axis: 24021±202 km (prograde), 24274±193 km (retrograde)
- Eccentricity: 0.2908±0.007 (prograde), 0.2828±0.0063 (retrograde)
- Orbital period (sidereal): 25.22073±0.000357 d (prograde), 25.22385±0.000362 d (retrograde)
- Inclination: 83.08°±0.86° (prograde), 119.14°±0.89° (retrograde)
- Longitude of ascending node: 31.99°±1.07° (prograde), 104.09°±0.82° (retrograde)
- Satellite of: 225088 Gonggong

Physical characteristics
- Mean diameter: <200 km 40–100 km
- Geometric albedo: >0.2
- Spectral type: V–I=1.22±0.17
- Absolute magnitude (H): 6.93±0.15

Xiangliu (formal designation (225088) Gonggong I) is the only known moon of the trans-Neptunian dwarf planet Gonggong. It was discovered by Gábor Marton, Csaba Kiss, and Thomas Müller in archival Hubble Space Telescope images taken on 18 September 2010. Its discovery was announced at the 48th Meeting of the Division for Planetary Sciences on 17 October 2016. The moon is named after Xiangliu, the nine-headed venomous snake monster from Chinese mythology who served the water god Gonggong as his chief minister.

Xiangliu is estimated to be less than 100 km (60 mi) in diameter and orbits Gonggong every 25.22 days at an average distance of 24,021 km (14,926 mi). It is thought to be tidally locked to Gonggong and may contribute to the maintenance of its highly eccentric orbit through tidal interactions or the Kozai mechanism.

== Discovery ==
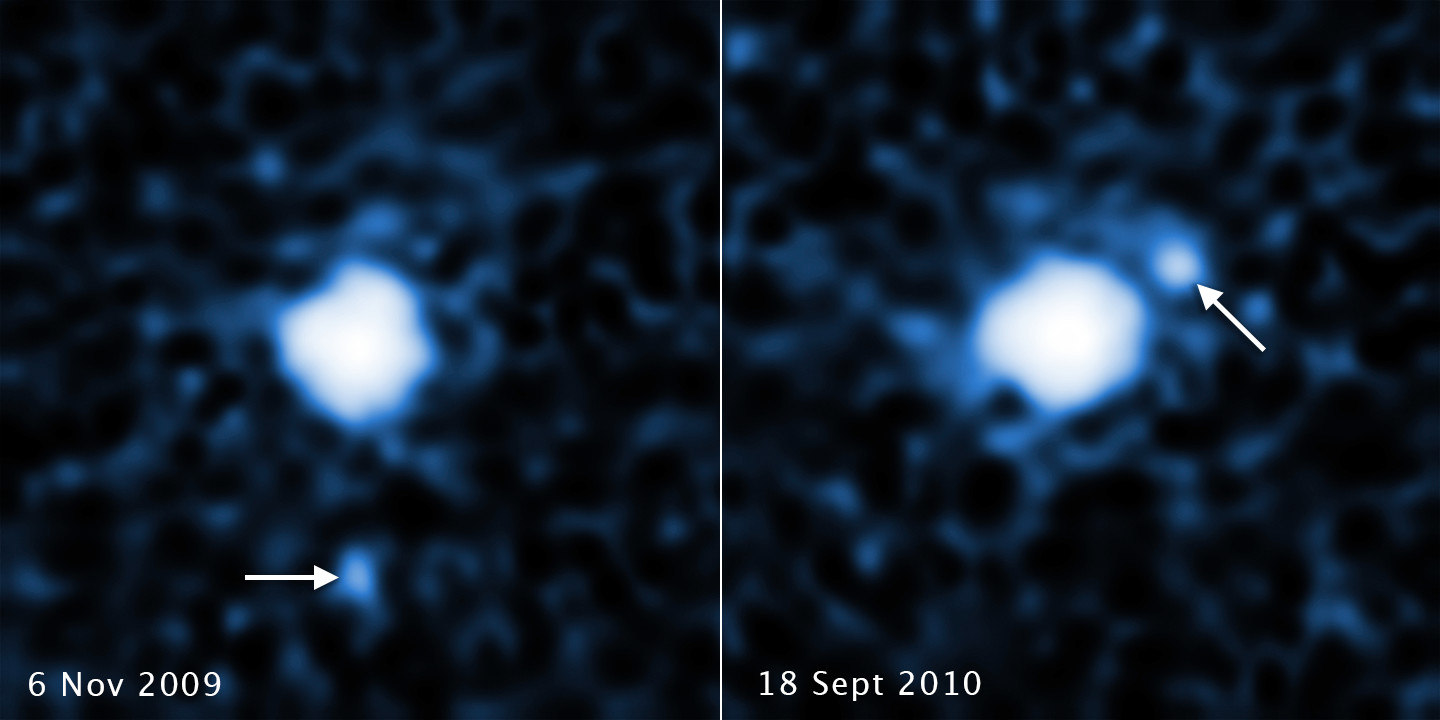
Discovery images of Xiangliu taken by the Hubble Space Telescope, showing the moon on 6 November 2009 (left) and 18 September 2010 (right)

After Gonggong was found in March 2016 to have an unusually slow rotation period, astronomers proposed that tidal interactions with an orbiting satellite might have caused the slowdown. This possibility prompted Csaba Kiss and colleagues to examine archival observations of Gonggong taken with the Hubble Space Telescope's Wide Field Camera 3. Their analysis of images taken on 18 September 2010 revealed a faint satellite orbiting at a distance of at least 15,000 km (9,300 mi). The discovery was announced by Gábor Marton, Csaba Kiss, and Thomas Müller at the 48th Meeting of the Division for Planetary Sciences on 17 October 2016, although the satellite was not immediately assigned a provisional designation. The team later identified the satellite in earlier archival Hubble images taken on 9 November 2009.

== Name ==
The satellite is named after Xiangliu, the nine-headed venomous snake monster and chief minister of the water god Gonggong in Chinese mythology. In the myth, Xiangliu is associated with flooding and destruction. When the discoverers of Gonggong proposed names for a public vote, they deliberately selected mythological figures with associated characters that could later provide names for any satellites. Xiangliu was named by its discovery team, led by Csaba Kiss, which had the privilege of naming the satellite. The names Gonggong and Xiangliu were approved by the International Astronomical Union's Committee on Small Body Nomenclature and announced simultaneously by the Minor Planet Center on 5 February 2020.

== Orbit ==
Based on Hubble Space Telescope images of Gonggong and Xiangliu obtained in 2009 and 2010, the discovery team initially constrained Xiangliu's orbital period to between 20 and 100 days. Additional Hubble observations in 2017 allowed the orbit to be determined more accurately. Xiangliu is thought to be tidally locked to Gonggong.

Because observations of Xiangliu cover only a small portion of Gonggong's orbit around the Sun, it is not yet possible to determine whether Xiangliu's orbit is prograde or retrograde. Under a prograde orbital solution, Xiangliu orbits Gonggong at an average distance of about 24,021 km (14,926 mi) and completes one orbit every 25.22 days. The same model indicates that its orbit is inclined by about 83 degrees to the ecliptic, suggesting that Gonggong is viewed nearly pole-on, assuming Xiangliu's orbit is only slightly inclined to Gonggong's equator.

Xiangliu's orbit is highly eccentric, with an eccentricity of about 0.29. This may reflect an initially eccentric orbit or the effects of slow tidal evolution, in which the timescale for orbital circularization is comparable to the age of the Solar System. Another possible explanation is the Kozai mechanism, driven either by solar tidal perturbations or by higher-order variations in Gonggong's gravitational potential caused by its oblate shape.

Animated time lapse of Xiangliu (circled) orbiting Gonggong in Hubble Space Telescope images from 2009 to 2019.

Same as left animation, but the images are reshuffled to show Xiangliu's orbital direction more clearly. A cyan dashed ellipse is overlaid to show Xiangliu's orbital path.

== Physical characteristics ==
To preserve its orbital eccentricity over a timescale comparable to the age of the Solar System, Xiangliu is estimated to be less than 100 km (60 mi) in diameter, corresponding to an albedo greater than 0.2. At the time of its discovery, its diameter was estimated to be 237 km (147 mi), based on the assumption that it had the same albedo as Gonggong.

Observations by the Hubble Space Telescope in 2017 showed that Xiangliu is 4.59 magnitudes fainter than Gonggong, corresponding to an estimated absolute magnitude of 6.93±0.15, based on Gonggong's estimated absolute magnitude of 2.34. Photometric measurements obtained the same year also showed that Xiangliu is significantly less red than Gonggong. The measured color difference, Δ_{V–I}=0.43±0.17, between Gonggong (V–I=1.65±0.03) and Xiangliu (V–I=1.22±0.17) is among the largest color differences observed for any known trans-Neptunian satellite. This pronounced color difference is unusual, as most trans-Neptunian satellites have colors similar to those of their parent bodies.
