= Sanmiao tribe =

Ethnic group in ancient China

三苗
- pre-c. 2,500 BCE
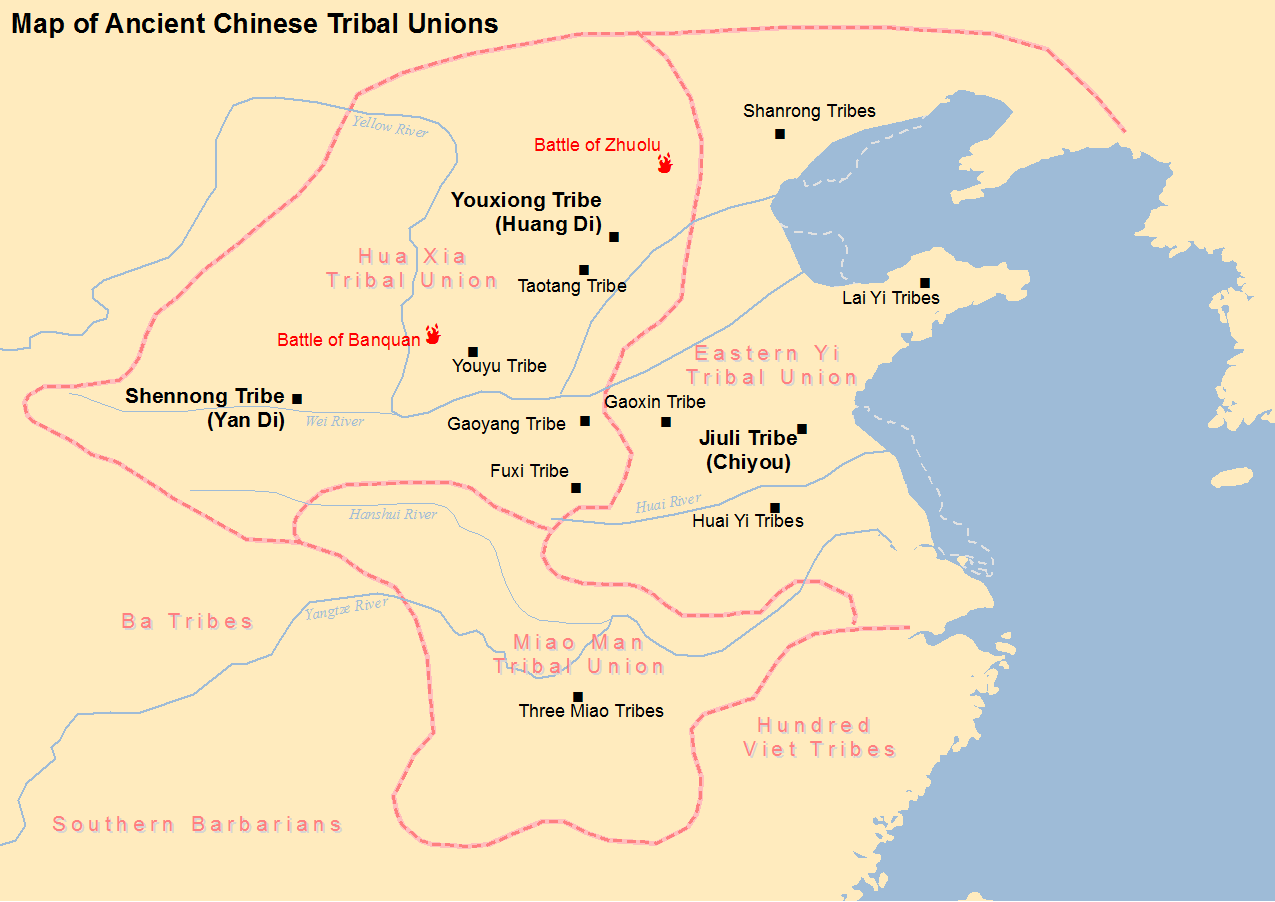
- Map of China during the Three Sovereigns and Five Emperors period, featuring the Jiuli Tribe.
- Government: Chiefdom
- Ruler
  - c. 2,500 BCE: Chiyou
- Zhurong
- Gonggong
  - c. 2,300 BCE: Huandou
- History
  - Established: pre-c. 2,500 BCE
  - Battle of Zhuolu: c. 2,500 BCE
  - Defeat by the Youyu clan: c. 2,300 BCE
  - Defeat by the Xia dynasty: c. 2,247 BCE
Preceded by
Jiuli tribe

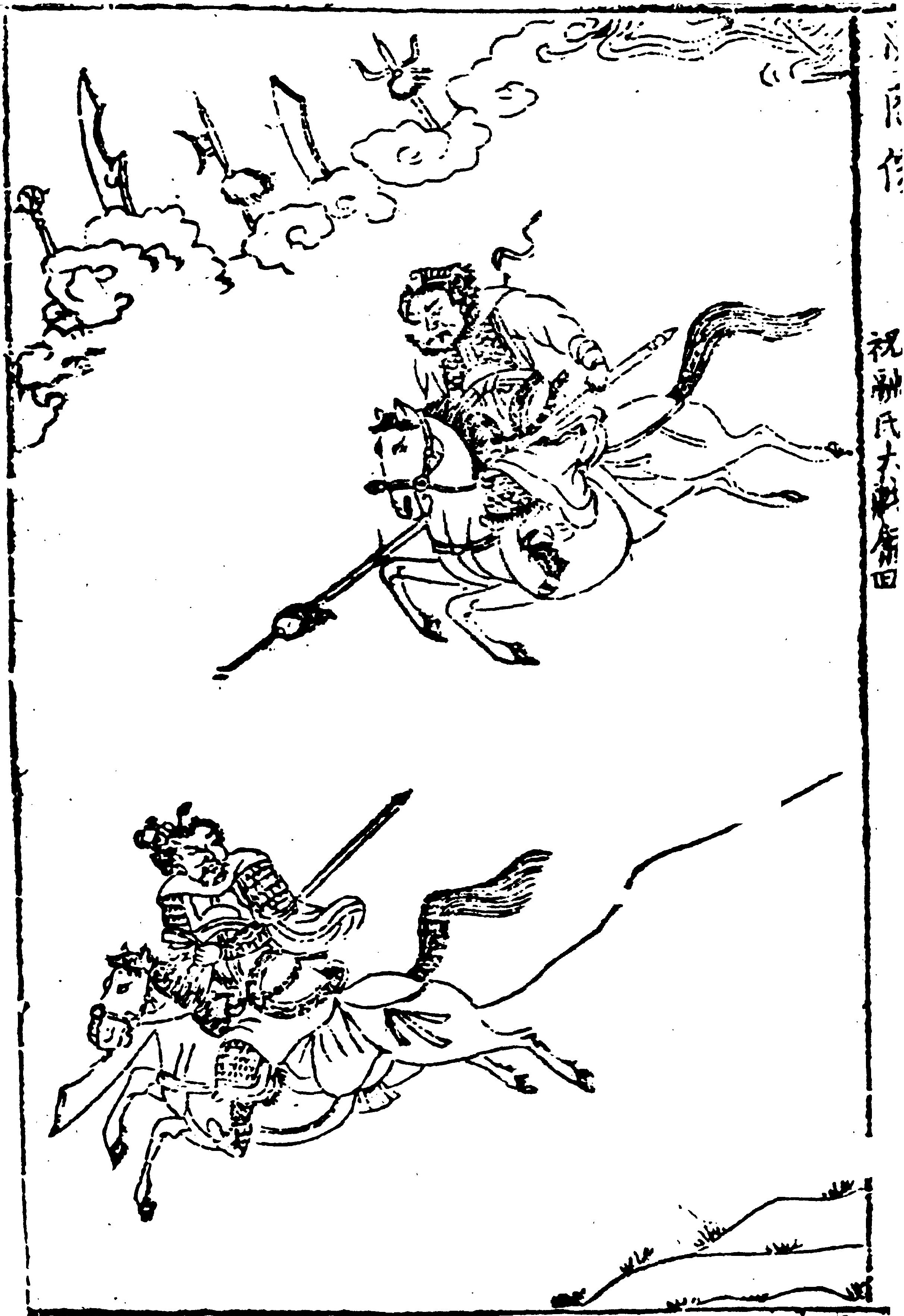
Zhurong in battle with Gonggong, leaders of the Sanmiao.

Sanmiao (Chinese: 三苗) was a legendary tribal confederation or state said to exist in ancient China. It was formed by the descendants of the Jiuli tribe, dismantled after the Battle of Zhuolu in 2,500 BC.

Their kingdom consisted of three distinct groups, led by three rulers. It rebelled against several Han emperors. They were persecuted and subjugated by Emperors Yao and Shun, thus being classified as one of the Four Criminals and nicknamed with the derogatory term "Miao".

The Sanmiao tribes were officially defeated by Yu the Great during the first rule of the Xia dynasty, in the end of the 20th century BC.

== History ==
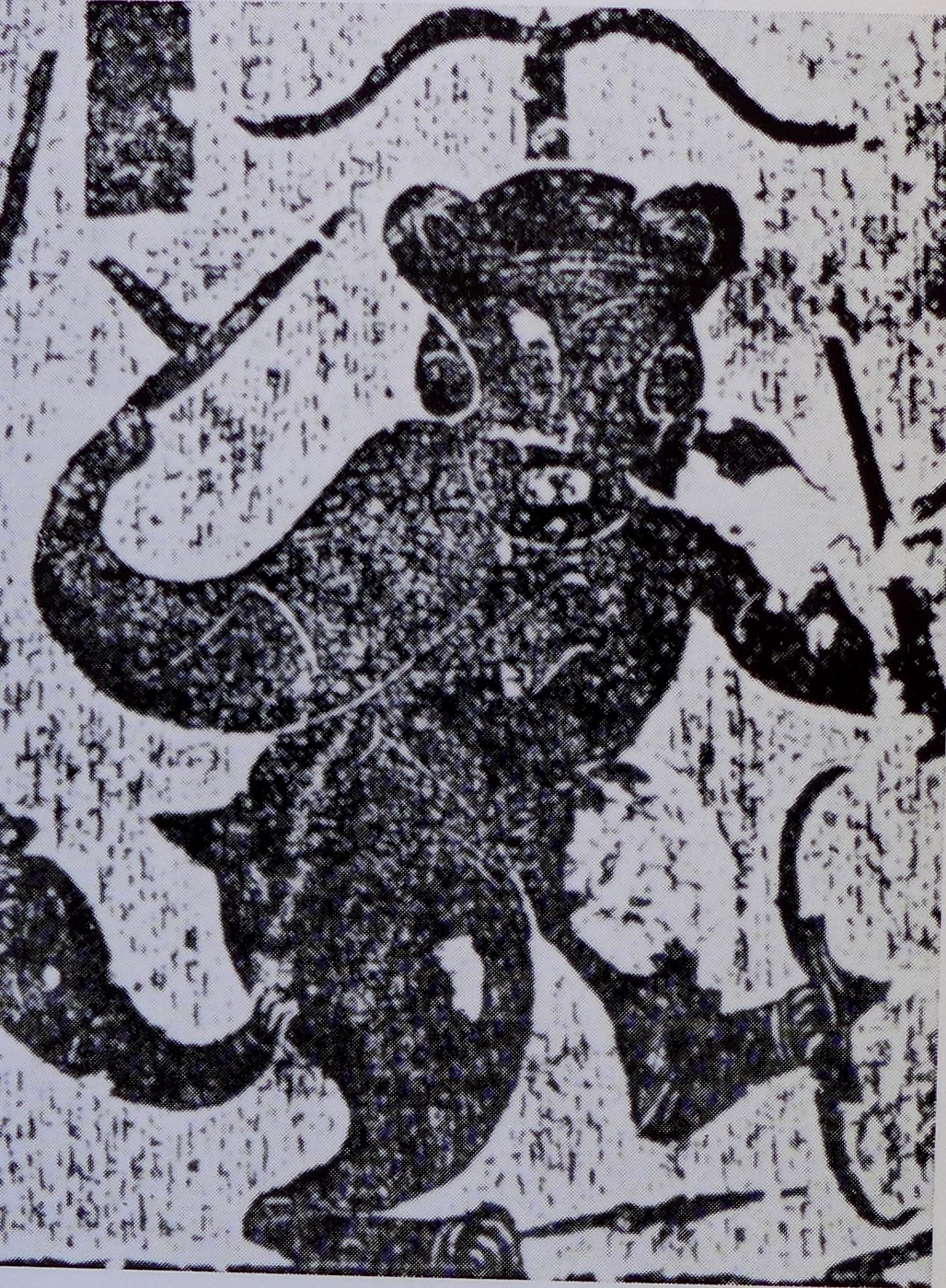
Chiyou, founder of the Sanmiao.

The Sanmiao Kingdom was established by Chiyou's descendants in Southern China, near Zishui River, where the Hunan Province is located nowadays. Their territory was composed of the upper Yangtze River, from the Han and Huai Rivers down to Poyang and Dongting Lakes. This is considered the second Hmong Kingdom, arising after the fall of the Jiuli Kingdom in the Battle of Zhuolu in about 2,500 BC.

Chiyou himself and Min Miao are considered the founders of the kingdom. It was composed of three distinct groups that were led by three different rulers. Three Sanmiao rulers were Zhurong, Gonggong and Huandou.

The Sanmiao kingdom refused to be part of the Han estate since the rule of Emperor Ku and Zhuanxu. The name "Miao" itself was a derogatory term used by the Han to refer to them. Yao wanted them to be part of his estate, but his request was denied by the Sanmiao leaders. Yao then sent his successor, Shun, in a military campaign, but he was defeated by Huandou. He then sent Chung and Li, finally subjugating them.

When Shun came to the throne, he sent Yu the Great to once again fight the Sanmiao and defeated Huandou in about 2,247 BC, making him flee to Shong Shana, nowadays located on Liyang County of Hunan Province. The Sanmiao were divided in several clans, and a Han official was appointed to "civilize" them. The ones that refused to be civilized had their noses and one or two ears cut off, were castrated, had their faces marked and were banned to Sanwei, near the Wei River. The people from north of Chishui River could not be defeated. Shun then classified them as the "Shu-ching" states, under the "barbarous" dominion.

After Shun's death, Yu the Great came into power. He founded the Xia dynasty and transformed his kingdom into a slave state. According to Lü Xing, people complained to Shangdi (上帝) about the bad behavior of the Sanmiao, but Shangdi saw the complete lack of de (德) and cut off his connection to them. He attacked the Sanmiao kingdom once more under Tian's orders, destroying it once for all. Yu slaughtered the ones that resisted his rule, which were the majority of the Sanmiao. The survivors migrated to the upper and lower valleys of the Yangtze River, stablishing themselves west of Lake Dongting, in the state of Wushi. Two other groups moved to where nowadays are Anhui and Jiangxi.

Their population diminished to almost extinction, and there were no historical records about their presence for the next 1,000 years. No other Hmong kingdom was ever established.

== See also ==
- Jiuli tribe
- Xia dynasty
- Four Perils
- Chiyou
- Miao
- Hmong
