= Huandou =

Miao ruler in ancient China

Huandou 驩兜
- 17th Century, bird-like depiction of Huandou based on the Classic of Mountains and Seas.

Ruler of the Sanmiao tribe
- Reign: ? - c. 2247 BCE
- Predecessor: Gonggong
- Born: c. 21st Century BCE; Sanmiao tribe
- Died: Mt. Chong (崇山); Modern-day Liyang County, Henan

Chinese name
- Traditional Chinese: 驩兜
- Simplified Chinese: 欢兜
Transcriptions
Standard Mandarin
- Hanyu Pinyin: Huāndōu

Huandou or Huantou was a Miao ruler of the Sanmiao tribe in ancient Chinese tradition, known for his exile and branding as one of the Four Criminals during the reign of Emperor Shun of the Youyu clan. Later texts regard Huandou as a mythical creature or state. Little is known about Huandou beyond posthumous accounts, particularly in the Chinese classics and Confucian texts.

== Name and identification ==
Huandou's name is recorded in several ways, all of which generally read the same: 歡/讙兜 Huandou, 讙/驩頭 Huantou, 鴅兜 Huandou, and 鴅吺 Huandou.

Zhang Shoujie identifies Huandou as a being synonymous with Hundun, a mythical creature symbolising the primordial chaos. Lüshi Chunqiu identifies Huandou as the name of a state (驩兜之國) rather than a person, something echoed in the Classic of Mountains and Seas, which synthesises this with the person narrative. However, this could be interpreted as "Huandou's Kingdom" or something similar given the use of zhi (之).

== Reign ==
Huandou ruled during a time where the Miao people maintained shaky relations with the neighbouring Taotang and Youyu clans. At the same time, a great flood devastated the region, and Emperor Yao sought to find someone to bring them under control. Huandou recommended Gonggong, at the time the ruler of his clan, to which Yao rejected him, believing him to be a rebellious and flawed leader. Gonggong was eventually banished to Youzhou.

Huandou would resist the rule of Emperor Yao on two occasions. First, he resisted a military expedition led by Shun, and then one by Yu the Great. The invasion by Yu led to Huandou retreating to Mt. Chong (崇山), where he was branded as one of the Four Criminals, and the Youyu clan gained hegemony over the region.

During a second invasion from Yu the Great, Huandou would finally be defeated, leading to the destruction of the Sanmiao, who would not appear again in the historical record for another 1,000 years.

== Ancestry ==
Some classics, such as the Zuo Zhuan, list Hundun as a member of the Di Hong clan (帝鴻氏), which was identified by Ming scholars as referring to Huandou under the tradition of Zhang Shoujie. The Classic of Mountains and Seas records Huandou as a descendant of Zhuanxu, the progenitor of the Youyu clan and himself a descendant of the Yellow Emperor. Another account from the same text claims he is the grandson of Gun, Earl of Chong.

== Legacy ==
18th Century depiction of the people of the Huandou Kingdom in Gujin Tushu Jicheng.

The Classic of Mountains and Seas describes a "Huandou Country" (驩頭之國) which appears to have appeared after his death. It also mythologises Huandou, depicting him as a bird-beaked man with wings, eating fish from the sea. Huandou, along with Chi You, is claimed by the modern Miao people as their progenitor.

== Historicity ==
As Huandou is known from transmitted early Chinese texts, there is no contemporary evidence of Huandou's existence, as there is little to no evidence of literary prior to the Shang dynasty. Although texts such as the Book of Documents and Records of the Grand Historian treat them as a figure of the Three Sovereigns and Five Emperors period, no contemporaneous inscription, excavated document, or archaeological find has been identified that verifies him as a historical individual. Since the earliest securely attested Chinese writing belongs to the Late Shang period, figures placed in the earliest received history cannot be confirmed. For example, the Great flood narrative that indirectly led to the Xia dynasty's foundation is severely disputed on geological grounds.
