= Xiangliu =

Mythological nine-headed Chinese serpent

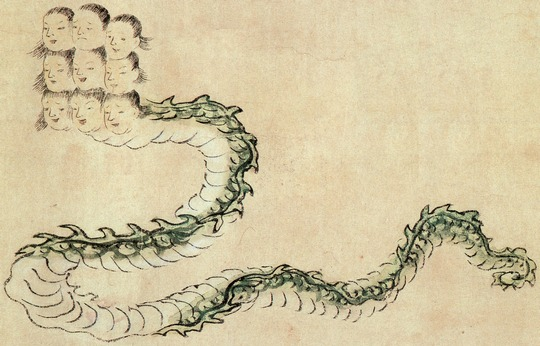
- An image of Xiangliu from Japan's Edo period

Chinese name
- Chinese: 相柳 (相栁)
Transcriptions
Standard Mandarin
- Hanyu Pinyin: Xiāngliǔ
- Wade–Giles: Hsiang1-liu3
- IPA: [ɕjáŋ.ljòʊ]

Xiangyao
- Chinese: 相繇
Transcriptions
Standard Mandarin
- Hanyu Pinyin: Xiāngyáo
- Wade–Giles: Hsiang1-yao2
- IPA: [ɕjáŋ.jǎʊ]

Vietnamese name
- Vietnamese alphabet: Tương Liễu, Tương Lưu?
- Hán-Nôm: 相柳

Korean name
- Hangul: 상류
- Hanja: 相柳
Transcriptions
- Revised Romanization: Sangryu

Japanese name
- Kanji: 相柳
- Hiragana: そうりゅう
Transcriptions
- Romanization: Sōryū

Xiangliu (/ʃæŋ.ljuː/), known in the Classic of Mountains and Seas as Xiangyao (/ʃæŋ.jaʊ/), is a venomous nine-headed snake monster that brings floods and destruction in Chinese mythology.

Xiangliu may be depicted with his body coiled on itself. The nine heads are arranged differently in different representations. Modern depictions resemble the hydra, with each head on a separate neck. Older wood-cuts show the heads clustered on a single neck, either side-by-side or in a stack three high, facing three directions.

== Legend ==
An image of Xiangliu from the Complete Classics Collection of Ancient China.

According to the Classic of Mountains and Seas (Shanhaijing), Xiangliu (Xiangyao) was a minister of the snake-like water deity Gonggong. Xiangliu devastated the ecology everywhere he went. He was so gluttonous that all nine heads would feed at the same meal. Everywhere he rested or breathed upon (or that his tongue touched, depending on the telling) became boggy with poisonously bitter water, devoid of human and animal life. When Gonggong received orders to punish people with floods, Xiangliu was proud to contribute to their troubles. Eventually, Xiangliu was killed, in some versions of the story by Yu the Great, whose other labors included ending the Great Flood of China, in others by Nüwa after he was defeated by Zhurong. The Shanhaijing says his blood stank to the point it was impossible to grow grain in the land it soaked and the area flooded, making it uninhabitable. Eventually Yu had to restrain the waters in a pond, over which the Sky Lords built their pavilions.

Sun Jiayi identified Xiangliu as an eel:

Sun points out that the eel is a most important animal in the flood tales of Formosan aborigines. Ying-lung, who ... made the beds of rivers by waggling his tail in the muddy soil and thus helped Yü to regulate the flood, was a kind of eel, too: Hsiang-liu [Xiangliu] stopped the water with his body; Ying-lung with his tail made it run freely, just as Yü's father Kun stopped the water, while Yü made it run. Kun who, according to legend, was executed for his inability to stop the flood, turned into a "dark fish"; and some texts ... call Kun "The naked one". Both names fit quite well the eel.

— Eberhard (1968: 350–351), parenthetical comments omitted

An oral version of the Xiangliu myth, in which Xiangliu is depicted as a nine-headed serpent responsible for floods and other harm, was collected from Sichuan as late as 1983.

== See also ==
- Chinese mythology
- Night at the Museum: Secret of the Tomb
- Yamata no Orochi
