= Sanmiao =

Sanmiao may refer to:

- Sanmiao tribe, an ancient Chinese people, related to the Miao people and one of the Four Perils
- Sammul Chan or Sanmiao (born 1978), Chinese actor, singer and presenter
