= Nüzhi =

Chinese mythological figure

In Chinese mythology, Nüzhi (Chinese: 女志; pinyin: Nǚzhì; lit. 'Woman Zhi') from the Youxin (有辛) clan was the wife of Gun and the mother of Yu the Great. This was mentioned in the second-century-BC text Shiben.

According to the third-century Genealogical Records of Emperors and Kings (帝王世紀, Diwang Shiji) by Huangfu Mi, Nüzhi saw a falling star piercing the Hairy Head of the Chinese constellations while traveling in the mountains. Then, in a dream, she received a pearl and Job's tears and swallowed them. Her belly split open and Yu was born at Stone Knob.
