= Jiuli tribe =

Mythological tribe in China

九黎
- pre-c. 2,500 BCE
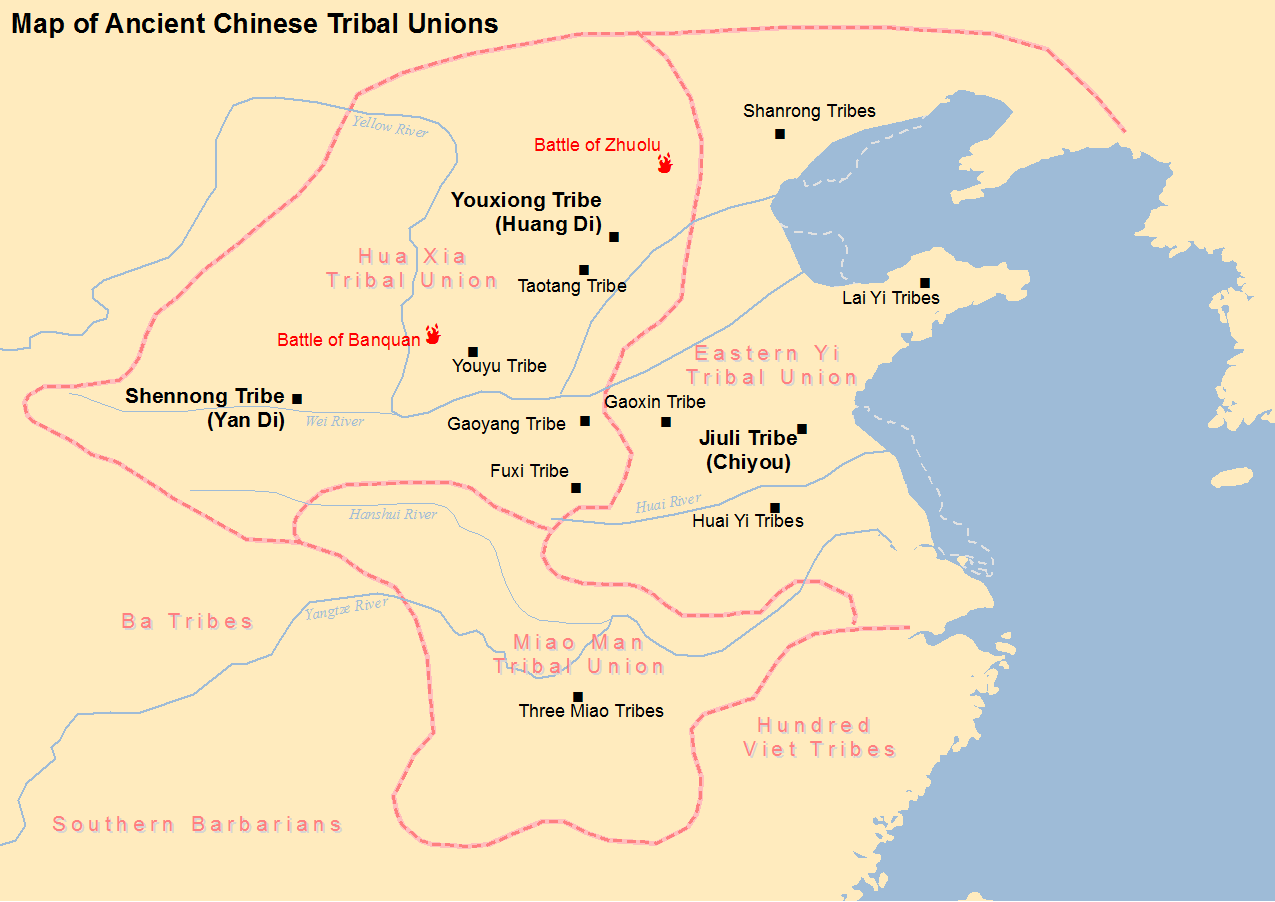
- Map of China during the Three Sovereigns and Five Emperors period, featuring the Jiuli tribe.
- Government: Chiefdom
- Ruler
  - c. 2,500 BCE: Chiyou
- History
  - Established: pre-c. 2,500 BCE
  - Battle of Zhuolu: c. 2,500 BCE
Succeeded by
Sanmiao tribe

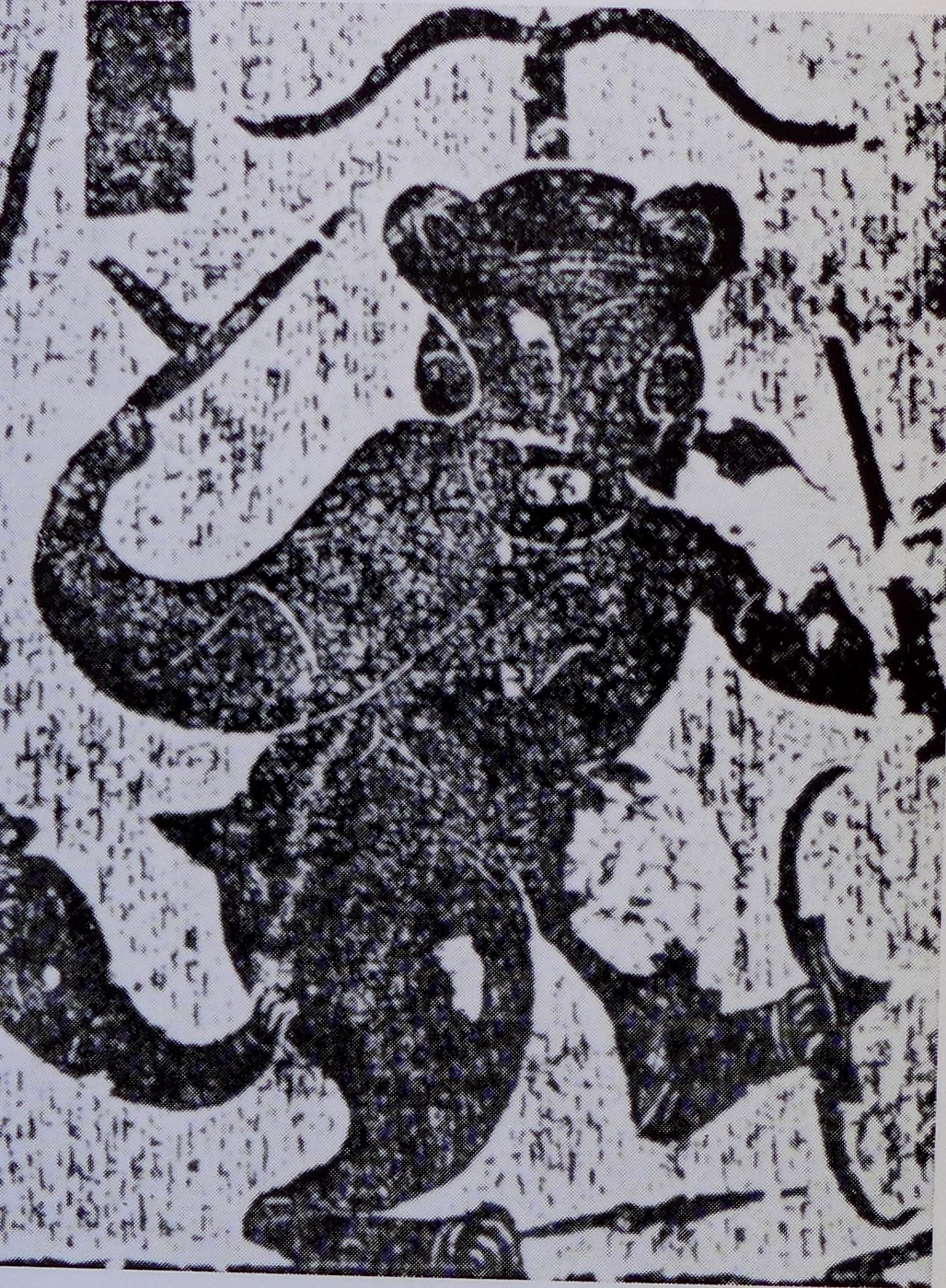
Chiyou, leader of the Jiuli tribe.

Jiuli (Chinese: 九黎, RPA White Hmong: Cuaj Li Ntuj, lit. "Nine Li") was a tribal group said to exist on the basins of the Yellow River and the Yangtze River in 2,500 BC. According to Chinese mythology, it was composed of 81 different clans and was led by Chiyou. The tribe fought his neighbors for issues related to farming and territorial disputes, and fell at the Battle of Zhuolu, when Chiyou was killed by the Yellow Emperor.

Despite its mythological status, it is considered by the Miao and Hmong people as their first kingdom, being later replaced by the Sanmiao Kingdom.

== History ==
According to Chinese mythology, the Jiuli was established in about 2,500 BC in Central China, near the Yellow River and Yangtze River basins, where today the Xie County in Shanxi Province is located.

According to the legend, the Jiuli was ruled by Chiyou and coexisted with other two kingdoms, ruled by the Yan Emperor and the Yellow Emperor. It was inhabited by 81 clans, including Miao (and their subgroup Hmong), Mu, Mo, Wei and Meng, that together were known as Jiuli. The kingdom was supposedly the first in Ancient China to forge tools and weapons out of metal, had a legal system and developed agriculture.

The Jiuli entered into an armed conflict with its neighbors for issues related to farming and territorial disputes. According to a Hmong folktale, the kingdom was invaded through the north by the ancestors of Han people and eventually fell. In another version, the war begun with ethnic conflicts and the kingdom fell after the Yan Emperor and the Yellow Emperor joined forces and killed Chiyou in the Battle of Zhuolu. The Jiuli survivors scattered southward.
