= Bin Gong xu =

Bin Gong xu (豳公盪) or Sui Gong xu (遂公盪) is a bronze tureen cast in a xu-style in the 9 century BCE, during the Western Zhou. It contains the first known narrative of Yu the Great.

== History ==
The Bin Gong xu was cast in 950-850 BCE, during the middle or late Western Zhou period.

It was rediscovered by representatives of the Baolin Museum in 2002. The tureen was on sale in a Hong Kong antiquities shop corroded and with its lid missing. Despite its state, it showed enough similarity to other vessels from the Zhou dynasty, such as Ying Hou, to confirm its authenticity. It was later transported to the Beijing Poly Art Museum.

The tureen was first dated by Liu Yu, Li Feng and others. The first set of scholarly discussions was published in June 2002 in the Chinese scientific journal Chongguo Lishi Wenwu (中国历史文物), followed in 2003 by a series of articles of Jao Tsung-i in Huaxue (華學). The first scholarly opinions in the West were from a congress at Dartmouth College.

== Description ==
The bronze tureen was cast in a xu-style. It has horizontal ribbed decór on its body, animal handles and images of long-tailed birds under the rim. It was cast in a similar manner to the Ying bronzes.

Constance A. Cook brings that the tureen was probably used during feasts, where the spirit of Yu the Great (大禹) would be summoned by zhu (祝) in order to receive his blessings. Despite its original discovery being unknown, he brings up the possibility that the turren was not buried with the local leader, as it was common at the time. Instead, it's possible that the recipient was passed down to other people.

== Inscriptions ==
The 98-character inscriptions were first discovered by the staff of the Shanghai Museum while cleaning the vessel. The inscriptions follow the lineage of the rulers of Bin (彬), that was first inhabited by Gong Liu (公刘) and later made into a state by his son Qingjie (慶節). The text was probably a song recited during the Yu rituals, as hinted by rhymes and the use of repetitive words, especially de (德), hao (好) and tian (天). It was first transcribed by Li Xueqin. There's doubt about the first character of the xu, that can be understood as sui (遂).

The text begins with Yu the Great "spreading earth" and regulating mountains and rivers by Tian's orders. He then splits the land and analyzes people's de in order to decide its governors. People then perform a matching ritual created by Yu to receive the de, where they became fathers and mothers and elect a king. The text ends with an oath for the patriacrh of Bin people, Bin Gong (Duke of Bin).

It is the first known record that cites Yu the Great as a cosmic creator and lineage progenitor. There, Yu is celebrated as the founder of the Zhou dynasty through the Bin lineage, said to have initiated the annual sacrifices and that he was worshiped in the jiao ritual. Other inscriptions, such as the Shijing (诗经) and Guoyu (国语), usually bring forth Hou Ji (后稷) as the progenitor of the Zhou. Despite the appearance of Yu, the Xia dynasty or any other names are not cited.

There are several differences from typical Western Zhou writings. Some of them are the absence of eulogization of the Mandate of Heaven by Kings Wen and Wu, the absence of accumulated merit by the Zhou, and the absence of the vessel maker and the reason for its confection.
