= Gun, Earl of Chong =

Earl of Chong and one of the Four Criminals

Earl of Chong Gun
- 鯀
- Gun (鯀) in small seal script.

Personal details
- Died: c. 2300-2200 BCE Feather Mountain (modern-day Lianyungang, Jiangsu)
- Cause of death: Executed (殛) or old age during exile
- Spouse: Nüzhi 女志
- Children: Yu the Great
- Parent: Luoming 駱明 (father)

Gun, Earl of Chong
- 鯀 in oracle bone script
- Traditional Chinese: 鯀
- Simplified Chinese: 鲧
Transcriptions
Standard Mandarin
- Hanyu Pinyin: gǔn
- Bopomofo: ㄍㄨㄣˇ
- Wade–Giles: kun^{3}
Middle Chinese
- Middle Chinese: kwonX
Old Chinese
- Zhengzhang: /*kuːnʔ/

Gun, Earl of Chong (Chinese: 崇伯鯀; pinyin: Chóngbó Gǔn; Wade–Giles: Ch'ung^{²}-po^{²} Kun^{³}, lit. "big fish") was a ruler of the State of Chong during the Taotang clan and Youyu clan eras of the Three Sovereigns and Five Emperors period of traditional Chinese historiography. He is said to have been the father of Yu the Great, the founder of the Xia dynasty. As ruler Chong, Gun was appointed to the task of controlling the Great Flood by Emperor Yao on the advice of the Four Mountains. Gun used dykes to try to stop the flooding, but the dykes collapsed, killing many people, leading to either his execution or exile by Emperor Shun, depending on account. He is thus labelled as one of the Four Criminals.

== Etymology & Identity ==
The character used for Gun's 鯀 (standard Chinese gǔn) name is unusual and not usually used in the names of individuals; it is furthermore rarely used to refer to anything other than Gun himself. In historical dictionaries, it literally translates to "big fish," as seen in Shuowen Jiezi and repeated in later works such as Kangxi Dictionary. However, come the classical period, the productive use of the word appeared to have ceased.

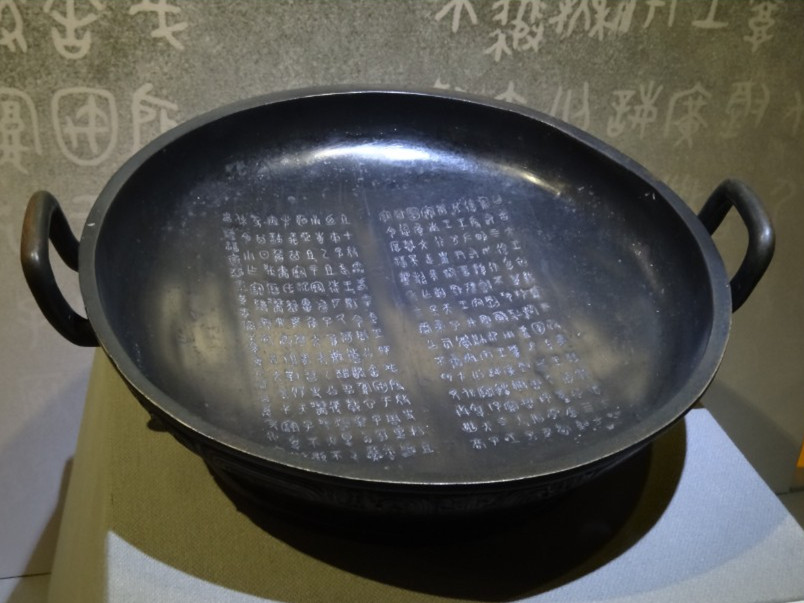
The Shi Qiang pan, featuring amongst the earliest uses of Gun's name as a character.

The earliest uses of Gun are in oracle bone inscriptions, where it is used as a placename in present-day Yucheng County, Henan. Bronze inscriptions record the name being used, such as the Gun Huan ding (鯀還鼎) and Shi Qiang pan (史牆盤) during the reign of King Gong of Zhou. However, none of these are in reference to this individual.

According to Schuessler (2009), 鯀 (standard Chinese gǔn < Old Chinese *kwə̂nʔ) is the same word as 鮌 (gǔn < OC *kwə̂nʔ) and 鯤 (kūn < OC *kûn), the latter being a mythical giant fish mentioned in Zhuangzi. Taiping Yulan (Siku Quanshu version) quotes "Records of Natural Conditions and Social Customs" (風土記) that the 鯤 Kūn (Note: Sibu Congkan (四部叢刊) version of Taiping Yulan has 鯢 ní "cow-whales" here instead of 鯤 Kūn.) is also colloquially known as 海鰌 hǎiqiū (literally: "sea loach"), which in turn has been identied with 鯨鯢 jīngní "bull-whales and cow-whales" by Emperor Yuan of Liang in his treatise Jinlouzi (金樓子 "Master of the Golden Chamber").

In his treatise "Commentaries on a miscellany of marine creatures in Fujian" (閩中海錯疏; Mǐnzhōng hǎicuò shū), Ming scholar Tu Benjun (屠本畯) states that the 馬鮫; mǎjiāo; "Chinese mackerel, Chinese seerfish" is also called 章鮌; zhānggǔn. Wolfram Eberhard (1968) suggests that Chinese texts' descriptions of 鯀 Gǔn as a "naked one" and "dark fish" (玄魚) (Note: "Records of picked-up Leftovers" (拾遺記) by Wang Jia (王嘉) additionally describes the dark fish, whom Gun became after drowning himself, as having scales and barbels.) fit the eel.

== In traditional historiography ==
The Bamboo Annals record Gun as being an Earl or Count (伯) of the State of Chong, the same state as the one governed by Marquess Hu of Chong during the Late Shang period, during the Three Sovereigns and Five Emperors period, specifically during the era of the Youyu clan. He would marry a member of the Youshen clan (有莘氏), Nuzhi (女志), and would have a child, Wenming (文命), who would later be known as Yu the Great.

During the reign of Emperor Yao around c. 2300-2200 BCE, an apocalyptic flood struck the Taotang clan, causing enormous suffering to the people into the period in which the Youyu clan ruled. Gun was chosen by Emperor Yao to control the flooding on the recommendation of the Four Mountains (四嶽), after he determined his son and current Minister of Works inadequate. Yao complained that Gun tends to disobey orders and ruins his companions, but the Four Mountains insisted out of desperation for the floods to receive some sort of control, stating that if Gun is found to be useless, then it shall be so. Gun would work at controlling the floods for nine years, building walls 3 ren high.

Lüshi Chunqiu by Lü Buwei (Note: This source records Gun as a Marquess (侯), in conflict with other texts) records an anecdote where Gun protested against the appointment of Emperor Shun when Emperor Yao intended to abdicate, on the grounds that Emperors know the Way of Heaven, and those who know the way of the land became the Three Dukes (三公). Although Gun understood the way of the land, he did not become one of the Three Dukes. Lü also records Gun deliberately disobeying the orders of Yao to trouble him, such as not responding to summons and instead wandering the kingdom.

A lost chapter of the Book of Gods and Strange Things mentions Gun, which was preserved in later works through quotation, particularly during the Ming dynasty. It mentions that Gun was a hairy man of the east, who innately understood the waters and the earth, what is flowing and what is obstructed. However, he acts for his own desires and benefits.

== Death and veneration ==
After nine years, despite initial success, Gun saw little progress in his attempts to control the floods. He would be imprisoned for life at Feather Mountain (羽山, at the present day Lianyungang, Jiangsu), far away from Youyu-shi civilisation, much to the horror of Yu the Great, who would be so beside himself to the point of not entering his home for over a decade. Sima Qian says he was later executed by Emperor Shun in hopes of changing the Dongyi, and was thus placed amongst the Four Criminals. K. C. Wu argues that an execution did not happen based on misinterpretations of the character ji (殛), believing it was an exile in line with alternate accounts. Wang Chong records in Lunheng that Gun's spirit became a yellow bear after his execution.

The Book of Rites records the Xia dynasty as giving jiao 郊 sacrifices to Gun as the individual to receive the Mandate of Heaven and pass it down to Yu the Great. This is placed in opposition to the Shang dynasty giving sacrifice to Ming, the Youyu clan doing so to Emperor Ku, and the Zhou dynasty doing so to Houji.

=== Alternative accounts ===
The above narratives are generally consistent across texts, but several texts are conflicted as to how and when Gun was executed.

The Classic of Mountains and Seas records that in order to make dykes that would ward off floods, Gun stole Xirang (息壤) (self-renewing soil) from the gods. After the dykes were finished, when the water levels rose, the magical earth of the dyke also rose to keep the water out. It worked very well at first, but when the dykes rose too high (in the legend, they rose to nine rèn (仞; "an ancient Chinese measure of between 1 and 3 meters"), they collapsed, resulting in the death of many people in the subsequent flood. Due to this accident, Gun was executed by Zhurong.

Han Feizi records an alternate tale of Gun's death, being that he protested against the appointment of Emperor Shun on the grounds of his common birth, which resulted in Yao executing him. Other sources however state that he committed suicide by jumping into an abyss, transformed into an animal and became the god of the abyss.

== Evaluation ==
In the Book of Documents, specifically the Book of Zhou, Jizi recalls the story of Gun failing to control the floods and placing it within the tradition of Wuxing, believing that he had thrown the five elements into disorder. In Chu Ci, specifically Heavenly Questions and Li Sao, Gun is portrayed in a noticeably more sympathetic light, with the writers decrying the hopeless task that Gun was put up to, and that his body did not decay for three years after his death.

Zhang Shoujie's Correct Meanings of Records of the Grand Historian (史記正義) identifies Gun with Taowu ("Block-Stump"), one of the Four Perils (四凶), as part of a broader equivalence between the Four Criminals and Four Perils.

=== Historicity ===
The historicity of the Great Flood narrative is disputed, with some believing it to be the Jishi Gorge outburst flood from c. 1920 BCE, while others associate it with typhoon-induced disasters from c. 3000 BCE. However, despite the scale of the flood as it occurred as stated in the Chinese classics, its historical location has not been ascertained as of 2026. Therefore, Gun's life is also in question.

== Family ==
According to Sima Qian's Records of the Grand Historian, Gun's father was Zhuanxu, grandfather was Changyi, and great-grandfather was the Yellow Emperor, Changyi & Gun being mere officials, not emperors. Book of Han, quoting Lord Yu Imperial Lineage, stated that Gun was a five-generation-descendant of Zhuanxu. The Classic of Mountains and Seas also records that Gun has family ties to Huandou, one of the Four Criminals. The text also records that Gun's personal name was Bai Ma (白馬 "white horse"), who was the son of Luómíng (駱明), who in turn was the son of the Yellow Emperor.

== See also ==
- Yu the Great - The son of Gun.
- Huandou - Said to be a grandson of Gun in some accounts.
- Marquess Hu of Chong - A successor from the Late Shang period.
- Zhurong - One of the alleged executioners of Gun.
- Four Perils - A group of entities with which Gun is associated.
