= Zhurong =

Chinese mythological figure

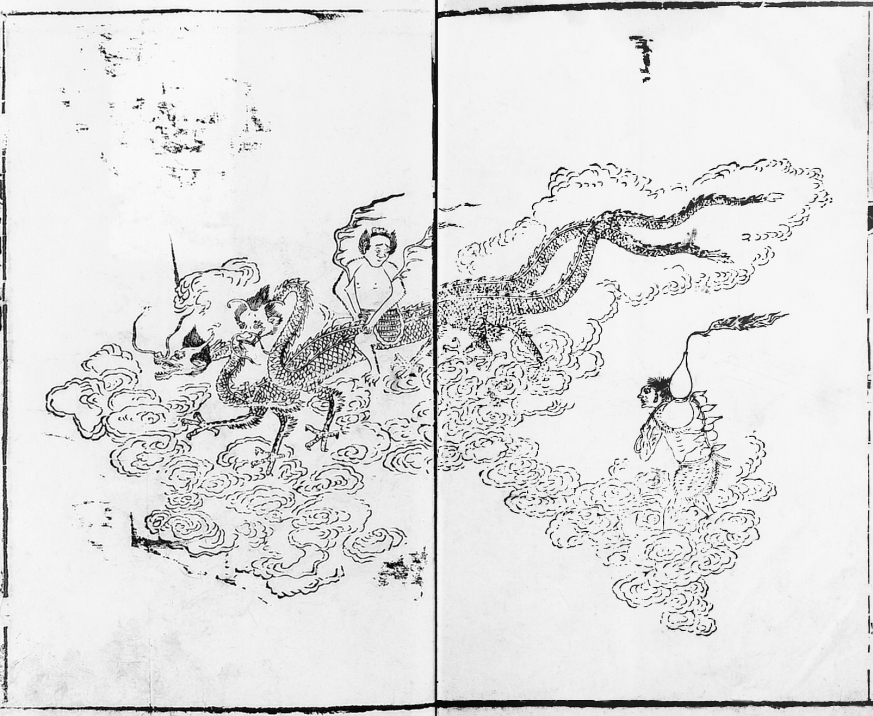
Zhurong riding two dragons, depicted in the Classic of Mountains and Seas, 1597 edition

Zhurong (Chinese: 祝融), also known as Chongli (Chinese: 重黎), is an important personage or being in Chinese mythology, historical materials, and Chinese folk religion. According to the Huainanzi and the philosophical texts of Mozi and his followers, Zhurong is a god of fire and of the south. Some sources associate Zhurong with some of the principal early and ancient myths of China, such as those of Nüwa (Nüwa Mends the Heavens), Gonggong, and the Great Flood. Other sources portray Zhurong as a historical person.

== Name ==
One aspect of the traditional Chinese characters used in the case of Zhurong's name is that the character 融 is composed by combining the character 鬲 which refers to a ritual cauldron or tripodal vessel with three hollow legs, which is well known from archeological reports as a characteristic Chalcolithic (Late Neolithic/Early Bronze) Age feature encountered in archaeological sites in northern China. This character is combined with another character, 虫; which, in the case of certain other complex characters is used productively to represent words with meanings related to worms, snakes, or insects. David Hawkes makes a connection between the characters in Zhurong's name and the culture and ceramic technology in ancient China.

== Historicity ==
Chinese mythology has in the past been believed to be, at least in part, a factual recording of history. Thus, in the study of historical Chinese culture, many of the stories that have been told regarding characters and events which have been written or told of the distant past have a double tradition: one tradition which presents a more historicised and one which presents a more mythological version. This is also true in the case of Zhurong. In Sima Qian's Records of the Grand Historian, Zhurong is portrayed as a historical person, who held the governmental office of Minister of Fire.

== Legendary ancestry ==
The Classic of Mountains and Seas gives alternative genealogies for Zhurong, including descent from both the Yan Emperor and Yellow Emperor. However, it is recorded in the suspicious part of Dahuangjing (大荒經) and Haineijing (海內經) that were written last.

The Classic of Mountains and Seas represents Zhurong as the son of a father whose name translates as "Play-with-Pots", who in turn is represented as the son of a father whose name translates as "Skillful Pot" (and is described as having a square top upon his head). In "General Introduction" to the Chu Ci anthology, Hawkes uses these observations to bolster his speculation of a significant relationship between the archeological evidence regarding ceramic technology and the cultural background of the Chu Ci material.

Zhurong was said to be the son of Gaoyang (also known as Zhuanxu), a sky god. (Again, the more historicised versions of the mythology portray Zhuanxu as a historical person; in this case an "Emperor of China"). Gaoyang also had a son, Gun, who fathered Yu the Great.

== Description ==
The Wu Liang Shrine inscriptions describe Zhurong as:

「祝誦〔融〕氏：無所造為，未有嗜欲，刑罰未施。」
"[...]: He did nothing. He was addicted to nothing and desired nothing. And punishment were not in [his] practice."

However, in one myth, Zhurong was interested in physical power and fought against Gonggong for days in a contest to see who was stronger. According to the Classic of Mountains and Seas, Gonggong is a descendant of Zhurong. This raises suspicions that Haineijing's record was distorted in the Han dynasty for Chinese political purposes.

== Legacy ==
The imperial clan of the Qin dynasty also claimed descent through Gaoyang (but not Zhurong). Zhurong was also claimed to be an ancestor to the eight lineages of the royal families of the state of Chu.

== See also ==
- Chinese ritual bronzes
- Lady Zhurong
- Xirang
- Zhurong rover, 2021 Mars rover
- Shennong clan
