= Gonggong =

Chinese water god

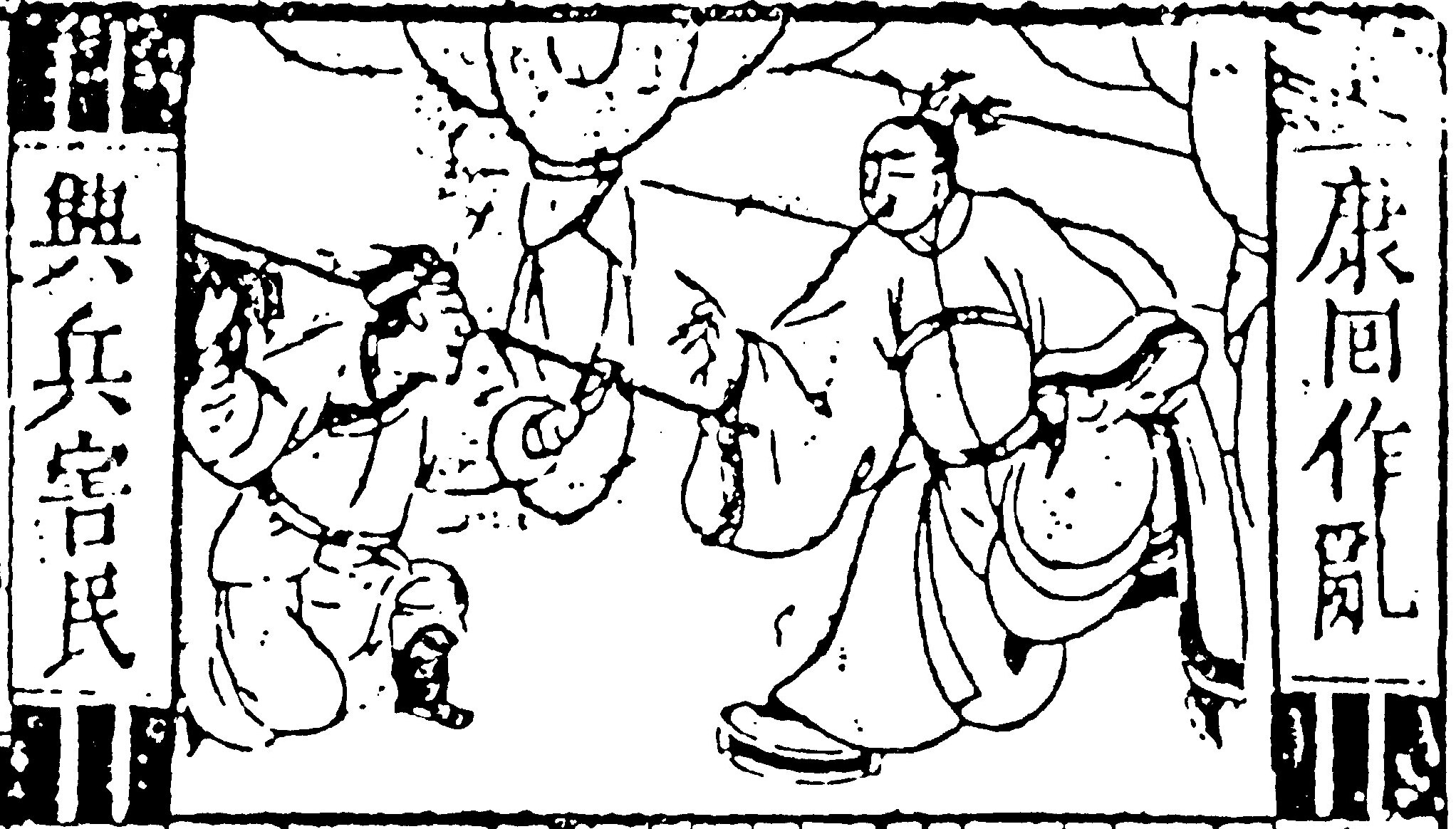
- 17th Century illustration of Gonggong's rebellion.

Gònggōng
- Chinese: 共工
Transcriptions
Standard Mandarin
- Hanyu Pinyin: Gònggōng
- Wade–Giles: Kung4-kung1
- IPA: [kʊ̂ŋ.kʊ́ŋ]
Wu
- Wugniu: gon^{6} gon^{1}
- IPA: Shanghainese: [ɡoŋ˨ koŋ˧]
Hakka
- Romanization: Khiung-kûng
Yue: Cantonese
- Jyutping: gung^{6} gung^{1}
- IPA: [kʊŋ˨ kʊŋ˥]
Middle Chinese
- Middle Chinese: gjowngH kuwng (Baxter)

Gōnggōng
- Traditional Chinese: 龔工
- Simplified Chinese: 龚工
Transcriptions
Standard Mandarin
- Hanyu Pinyin: Gōnggōng
- Wade–Giles: Kung1-kung1
- IPA: [kʊ́ŋ.kʊ́ŋ]
Wu
- Wugniu: kon^{1} kon^{1}
- IPA: Shanghainese: [koŋ˥ koŋ˧]
Yue: Cantonese
- Jyutping: gung^{1} gung^{1}
- IPA: [kʊŋ˥ kʊŋ˥]
Middle Chinese
- Middle Chinese: kjowng kuwng (Baxter)

Kanghui
- Chinese: 康回
Transcriptions
Standard Mandarin
- Hanyu Pinyin: Kānghuí
- Wade–Giles: Kʻang1-hui2
- IPA: [kʰáŋ.xwěɪ]
Wu
- Wugniu: khaon^{1} we^{2}
- IPA: Shanghainese: [kʰɑ̃˥ ɦue˧]
Yue: Cantonese
- Jyutping: hong^{1} wui^{4}
- IPA: [hɔŋ˥ wuj˩]
Middle Chinese
- Middle Chinese: khang hwoj (Baxter)

Vietnamese name
- Vietnamese alphabet: Cung Công, Cộng Công, Khang Hồi
- Hán-Nôm: 共工, 龔工, 康回

Korean name
- Hangul: 공공
- Hanja: 共工
Transcriptions
- Revised Romanization: Gonggong

Japanese name
- Kanji: 共工
- Hiragana: きょうこう
Transcriptions
- Romanization: Kyōkō

Gonggong (/ˈɡɒŋɡɒŋ/) is a Chinese water god who is depicted in Chinese mythology and folktales as having a copper human head with an iron forehead, red hair, and the body of a serpent, or sometimes the head and torso are human, with the tail of a serpent. He is destructive and is blamed for various cosmic catastrophes. In all accounts, Gonggong ends up being killed or sent into exile, usually after losing a struggle with another major deity such as the fire god Zhurong.

In astronomy, the dwarf planet 225088 Gonggong is named after Gonggong.

== Name ==
In English, the two syllables of the name are the same. But in Mandarin, they differ in tone (共工 Gònggōng), and in other Chinese languages they differ in their vowel and the initial consonant as well (cf. Middle Chinese *ɡɨoŋh-kuŋ, also Japanese kyōkō). The most common variant of the name, 龔工, is identical to the first in English, but in Mandarin remains in high-level tone (Gōnggōng), and in other Chinese languages in consonant and vowel as well (cf. Middle Chinese *kɨoŋ-kuŋ).

Gonggong's personal name is said to be Kanghui (pronounced either /ˈkæŋhuːi/ KANG-hoo-ee in English, or as Mandarin Kānghuí kʰáŋ.xwěi kong-HWAY).

== Legend ==
Gonggong is known from the late Warring States period (before 221 BC). Gonggong appears in the ancient "Heavenly Questions" (Tianwen) poem of the Chu Ci, where he is blamed for knocking the Earth's axis off center, causing it to tilt to the southeast and the sky to tilt to the northwest. This axial tilt is used to explain why the rivers of China generally flow to the southeast, especially the Yangzi River and the Yellow River, and why the Sun, Moon, and stars move towards the northwest. Literature from the Han dynasty becomes much more detailed regarding Gonggong. For example, within the Classic of Mountains and Seas, he is noted as being the son of Zhurong, father of Houtu, and a descendant of the Flame Emperor. However, in a separate verse, he is also said to be a descendant of the Black Emperor. Records of the Grand Historian corroborates the latter account.

Gonggong was credited in various mythological contexts as being responsible for great floods, often in concert with his minister Xiangliu (a.k.a. Xiangyao), who has nine heads and the body of a snake.

Gonggong was ashamed that he lost the fight with Zhurong, the Chinese god of fire, to claim the throne of Heaven. In a fit of rage, he smashed his head against Buzhou Mountain, one of eight pillars holding up the sky, greatly damaging it and causing the sky to tilt towards the northwest and the Earth to shift to the southeast, which caused great floods and suffering. In one account of the myth, Gonggong kills himself in the process and fire comes out of the shattered mountain alongside floods.

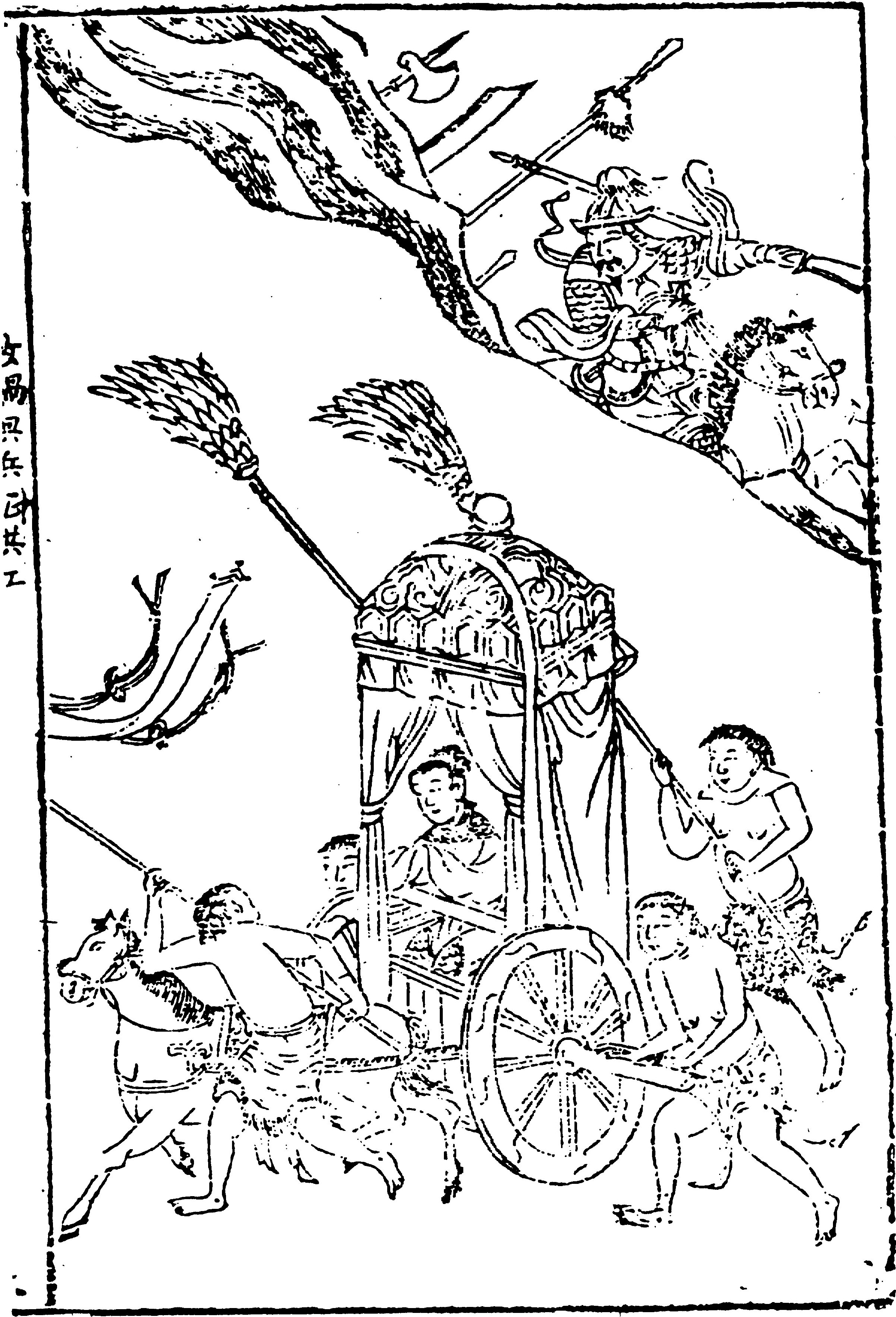
The goddess Nüwa raises troops to fight against Gonggong (1635 illustration)

The goddess Nüwa cut off the legs of the giant turtle Ao and used them in place of the fallen pillar, ending the floods and suffering; she was, however, unable to fully correct the tilted sky and Earth and alter their effects on the Sun, Moon, stars, and rivers in China.

== See also ==
- Yinglong
- Four Criminals
- Shennong clan
