= Yu the Great =

Xia Dynasty king and founder

Yu the Great 大禹
- Yu as depicted by Song-era artist Ma Lin (馬麟), National Palace Museum

Founder of the Xia dynasty
- Predecessor: Dynasty established
- Successor: Qi
- Died: Mount Kuaiji
- Spouse: Lady Tushan
- Issue: Qi of Xia
- Father: Gun
- Mother: Nüzhi

King Yu
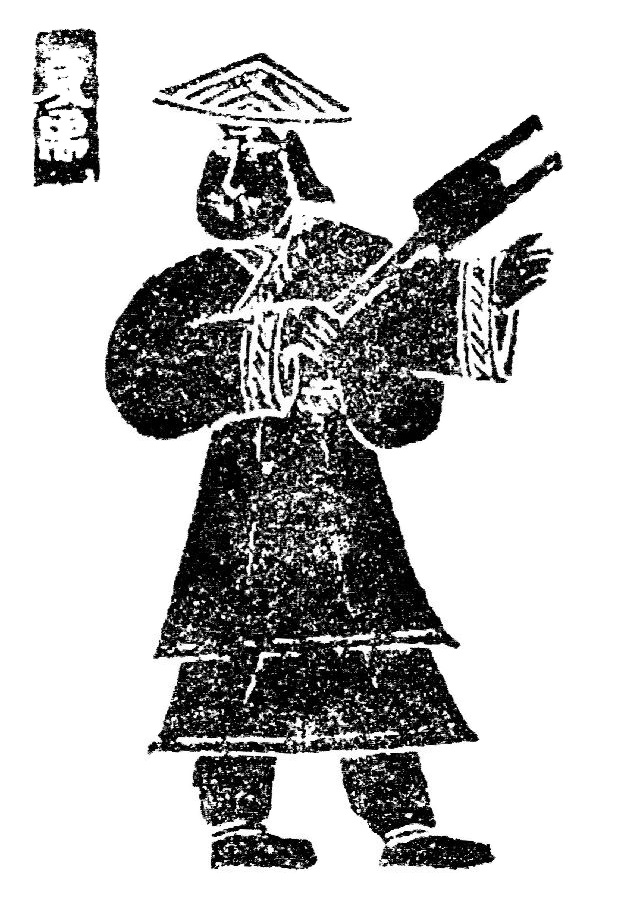
- King Yu as depicted in Wu Family Shrines in Jiaxiang, Shandong, from the mid 2nd century AD.
- Chinese: 大禹
Transcriptions
Standard Mandarin
- Hanyu Pinyin: Dà Yǔ
- Wade–Giles: Ta^{4} Yü^{3}
- IPA: [tâ ỳ]
Yue: Cantonese
- Yale Romanization: Daaih Yúh
- Jyutping: Daai6 Jyu5
- IPA: [taj˨ jy˩˧]
Southern Min
- Hokkien POJ: Tāi-í; Tāi-ú
Old Chinese
- Baxter–Sagart (2014): *lˤat-s ɢʷraʔ

Yu the Great or Yu the Engineer was a legendary sage-king in ancient China who was credited with "the first successful state efforts at flood control", his establishment of the Xia dynasty, which inaugurated dynastic rule in China, and for his upright moral character. He figures prominently in the Chinese legend titled "Great Yu Controls the Waters" (大禹治水; Dà Yǔ zhì shuǐ). Yu and other sage-kings of ancient China were lauded for their virtues and morals by Confucius and other Chinese teachers. He is one of the few Chinese monarchs who is posthumously honored with the epithet "the Great".

There is no contemporary evidence of Yu's existence as traditionally attested in the Shiji. Yu is said to have ruled as sage-king during the late 3rd millennium BC, which predates the oracle bone script used during the late Shang dynasty—the oldest known form of writing in China—by nearly a millennium. Yu's name was not inscribed on any artifacts which were produced during the proposed era in which he lived, nor was it inscribed on the later oracle bones; his name was first inscribed on vessels which date to the Western Zhou period (c. 1045 – 771 BC).

== Name ==
The Shuowen Jiezi (c. 121 AD) gives the earliest definition of yu 禹 under the ⽱ 'TRACK' radical: 'bug', 'reptile'; a pictograph.

Historical linguist Axel Schuessler reconstructs the Old Chinese pronunciation of 禹 as *waʔ, and compares it to either Proto-Tibeto-Burman *was 'bee', 'honey', or Proto-Waic *wak 'insect' (further from Proto-Palaungic *ʋaːk).

== Ancestry and early life ==
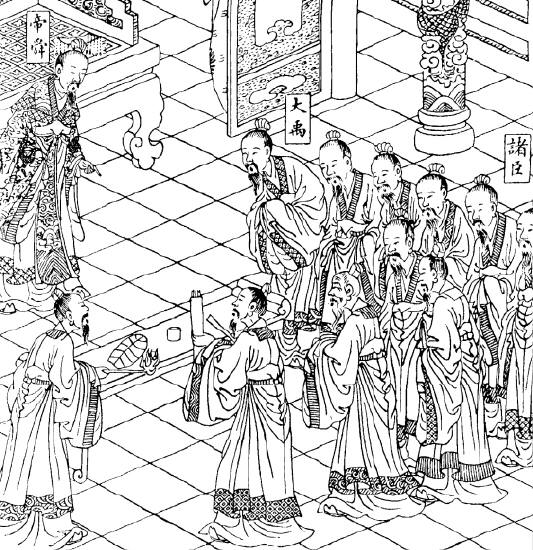
Qing dynasty illustration of Yu observing Emperor Shun's divination.

Transmitted sources uniformly asserted that Yu was the son of Gun, whose name denotes a kind of mythical fish, though they differed on Gun's origins. According to Sima Qian's Shiji (c. 90 BC), Yu's father was Gun, grandfather was Zhuanxu, great-grandfather was Changyi, and great-great-grandfather was the Yellow Emperor, Changyi and Gun being mere officials, not emperors. The Book of Han, quoting Lord Yu Imperial Lineage, stated that Yu's father Gun was a five-generation-descendant of Zhuanxu. The Classic of Mountains and Seas stated that Yu's father Gun (also known as 白馬; 'White Horse') was the son of Luoming, who in turn was the son of the Yellow Emperor.

Yu's father, Gun, was enfeoffed at Shiniu of Mount Wen (汶山), in modern-day Beichuan County, Sichuan, Yu was said to have been potentially born there, though there are debates as to whether he was born instead in Shifang. Yu's mother was of the Youxin (有莘氏) clan, named either Nüzhi (女志) or Nüxi (女嬉). His surname was Si, later Xia after the state he was enfeoffed with, while his personal name was Wenming (文命), according to the Shiji.

When Yu was a child, Emperor Yao enfeoffed Gun as Earl of Chong, usually identified as the middle peak of Mount Song. Yu is thus believed to have grown up on the slopes of Mount Song, just south of the Yellow River. Yu was described as a trustworthy, hard working, quick witted person with unwavering morals. He later married a woman from Mount Tu (塗山) who is generally referred to as Tushanshi (塗山氏; 'Lady Tushan'). They had a son named Qi, a name literally meaning "revelation".

The location of Mount Tu has always been disputed. The two most probable locations are Mount Tu in Anhui, and the Tu Peak of the Southern Mountain of Chongqing.

A separate legend of Yu's birth is attested in an excavated manuscript, the provenance of which is provisionally assigned to the Warring States period. In this legend, Yu's mother became pregnant after consuming the grains of a Job's tears plant, and gave birth to him through her back after a three-year gestation period.

=== Great Flood legend ===
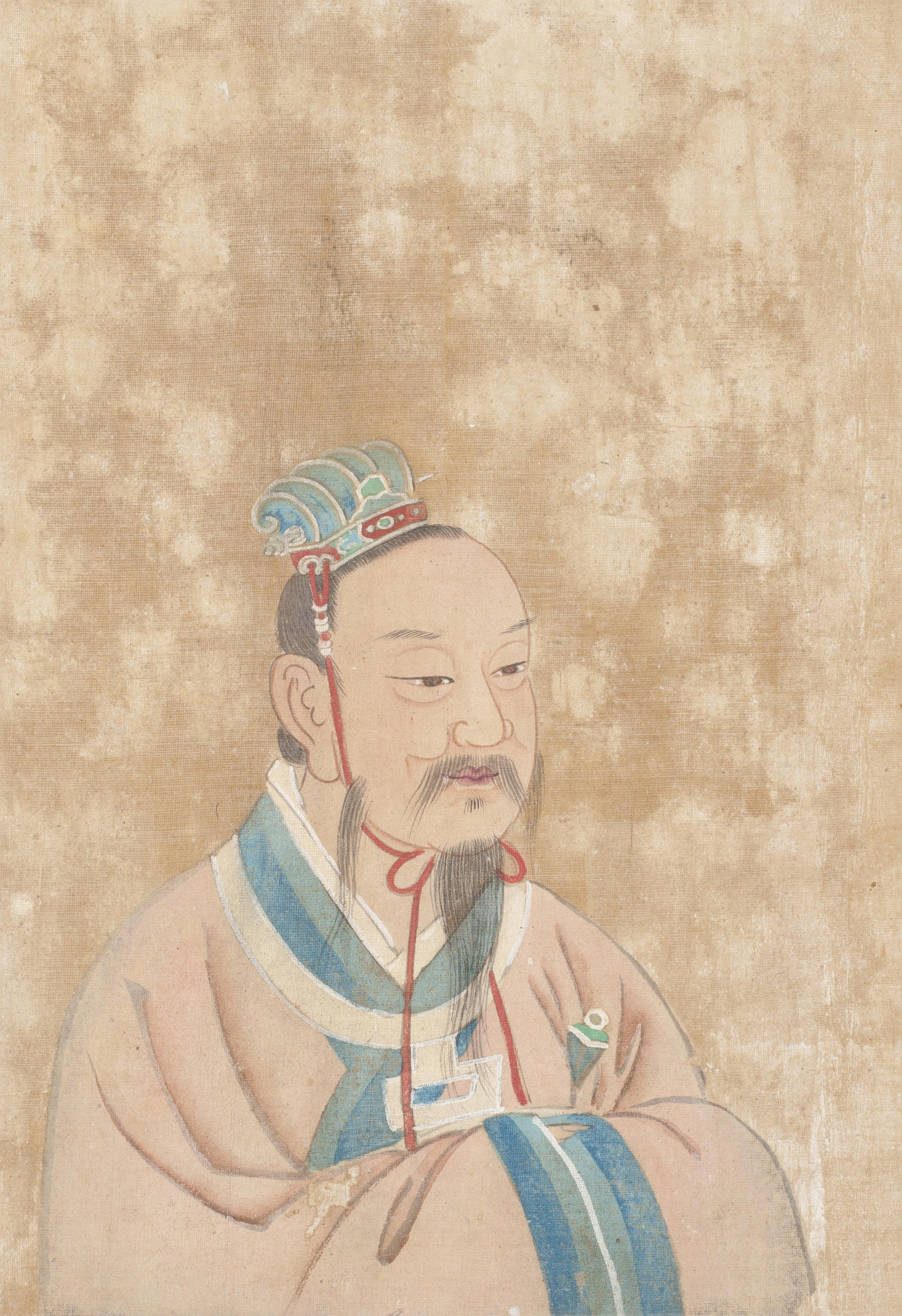
Yu as depicted in the album Portraits of Famous Men c. 1900, housed in the Philadelphia Museum of Art

During the reign of Emperor Yao, the Chinese heartland was frequently plagued by floods that prevented further economic and social development. Yu's father, Gun, was tasked with devising a system to control the flooding. He spent more than nine years building a series of dikes and dams along the riverbanks, but all of this was ineffective, despite (or because of) the great number and size of these dikes and the use of a special self-expanding soil. As an adult, Yu continued his father's work and made a careful study of the river systems in an attempt to learn why his father's great efforts had failed.

Collaborating with Hou Ji, a semi-mythical agricultural master, Yu successfully devised a system of flood controls that were crucial in establishing the prosperity of the Chinese heartland. Instead of directly damming the rivers' flows, Yu constructed a system of irrigation canals which redirected flood water into fields, as well as expending a great effort to dredge the riverbeds. Yu is said to have eaten and slept with the common workers and spent most of his time personally assisting the work of dredging the silty beds of the rivers for the thirteen years the projects took to complete. The dredging and irrigation were successful, and allowed ancient Chinese culture to flourish along the Yellow River, Wei River, and other waterways of the Chinese heartland. The project earned Yu renown throughout Chinese history, and is referred to in Chinese history as "Great Yu Controls the Waters" (大禹治水; Dà Yǔ zhì shuǐ). In particular, Mount Longmen along the Yellow River had a very narrow channel which blocked water from flowing freely east toward the ocean. Yu is said to have brought a large number of workers to open up this channel, which has been known ever since as "Yu's Gateway" (禹門口). According to Shangshu, Yu and Hou Ji worked together to spread seeds and teach people how to feed themselves.

In a retold version of this story as presented in Wang Jia's Shi Yi Ji (4th century AD), Yu is assisted in his work by a yellow dragon and a black turtle (not necessarily related to the Black Tortoise in Chinese mythology). Another local myth says that Yu created the Sanmenxia in the Yellow River by cutting a mountain ridge with a divine battle-axe to control flooding. This is perhaps a reference to a meteorite stone—something hard enough to etch away at the hard bedrock of Mount Longmen.

Traditional stories say that Yu sacrificed a great deal of his body to control the floods. For example, his hands were said to be thickly calloused, and his feet were completely covered with calluses. In one common story, Yu had only been married four days when he was given the task of fighting the flood. He said goodbye to his wife, saying that he did not know when he would return. During the thirteen years of flooding, he passed by his own family's doorstep three times, but each time he did not return inside his own home. The first time he passed, he heard that his wife was in labor. The second time he passed by, his son could already call out to his father. His family urged him to return home, but he said it was impossible as the flood was still going on. The third time Yu was passing by, his son was more than ten years old. Each time, Yu refused to go in the door, saying that as the flood was rendering countless number of people homeless, he could not rest.

Yu supposedly killed Gonggong's minister Xiangliu, a nine-headed snake monster.

== Nine Provinces ==
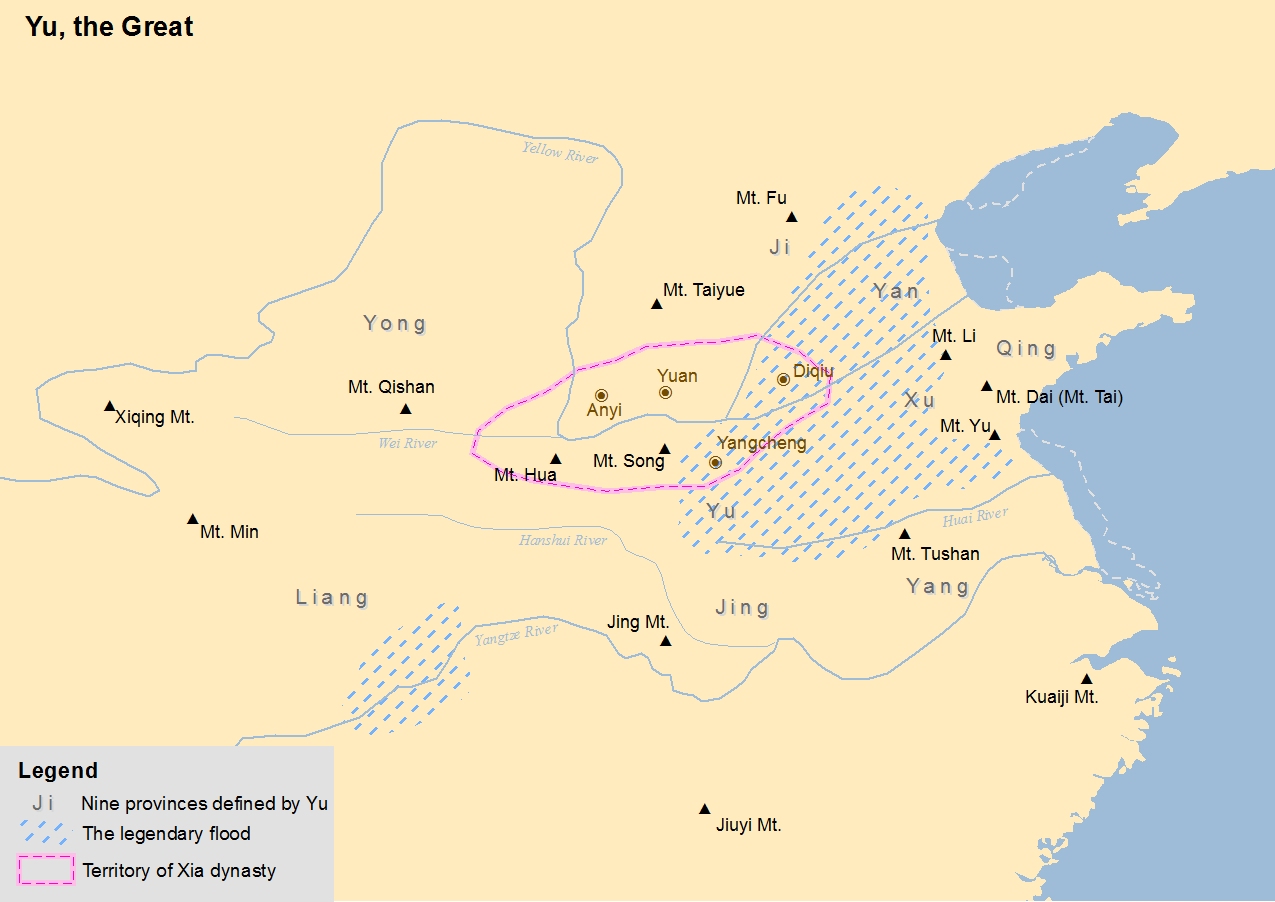
Map showing the Nine provinces defined by Yu the Great during the legendary flood

Emperor Shun, who reigned after Yao, was so impressed by Yu's engineering work and diligence that he passed the throne to Yu instead of to his own son. Yu is said to have initially declined the throne, but was so popular with other local lords and chiefs that he agreed to become the new emperor, at age 53. He established a capital at Anyi (安邑), the ruins of which are in modern Xia County in southern Shanxi and founded what would be called the Xia, traditionally considered China's first dynasty.

Yu's flood control work is said to have made him intimately familiar with all regions of what was then Huaxia territory. According to his Yu Gong treatise in the Book of Documents, Yu divided the Chinese world into nine zhou or provinces. These were Jizhou, Yanzhou, Qingzhou, Xuzhou, Yangzhou, Jingzhou, Yuzhou, Liangzhou, and Yongzhou.

According to the Rites of Zhou, there was no Xuzhou or Liangzhou, instead there were Youzhou and Bingzhou, but according to the Erya there was no Qingzhou or Liangzhou, instead there was Youzhou (幽州) and Yingzhou (營州). Either way there were nine divisions. Once he had received bronze from these nine territories, he created ding vessels called the Nine Tripod Cauldrons. Yu then established his capital at Yang (陽城, modern Dengfeng). It is said in the Book of Documents that the Miao people rebelled under their leader, but he treated them harshly and so many abandoned him. He fought with Yu, who had the intention to kill him, but after defeating him spared him and reformed him for 3 years. He became wise and ruled well and the people returned. The Bamboo Annals claim Yu killed Fangfeng, one of the northern leaders, to reinforce his hold on the throne.

== Mausoleum ==
Mausoleum for Yu the Great in Shaoxing, Zhejiang

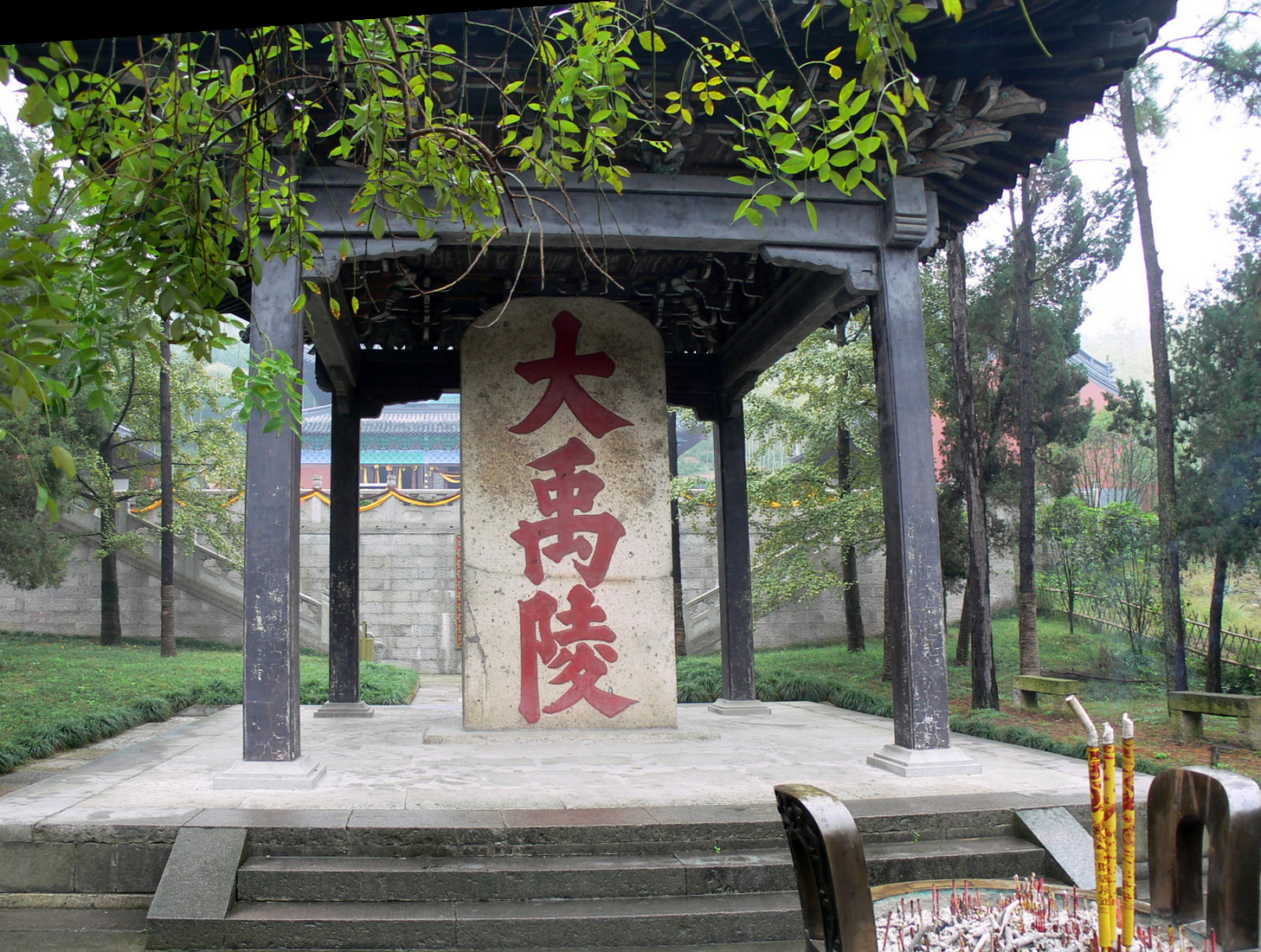
Mausoleum stele

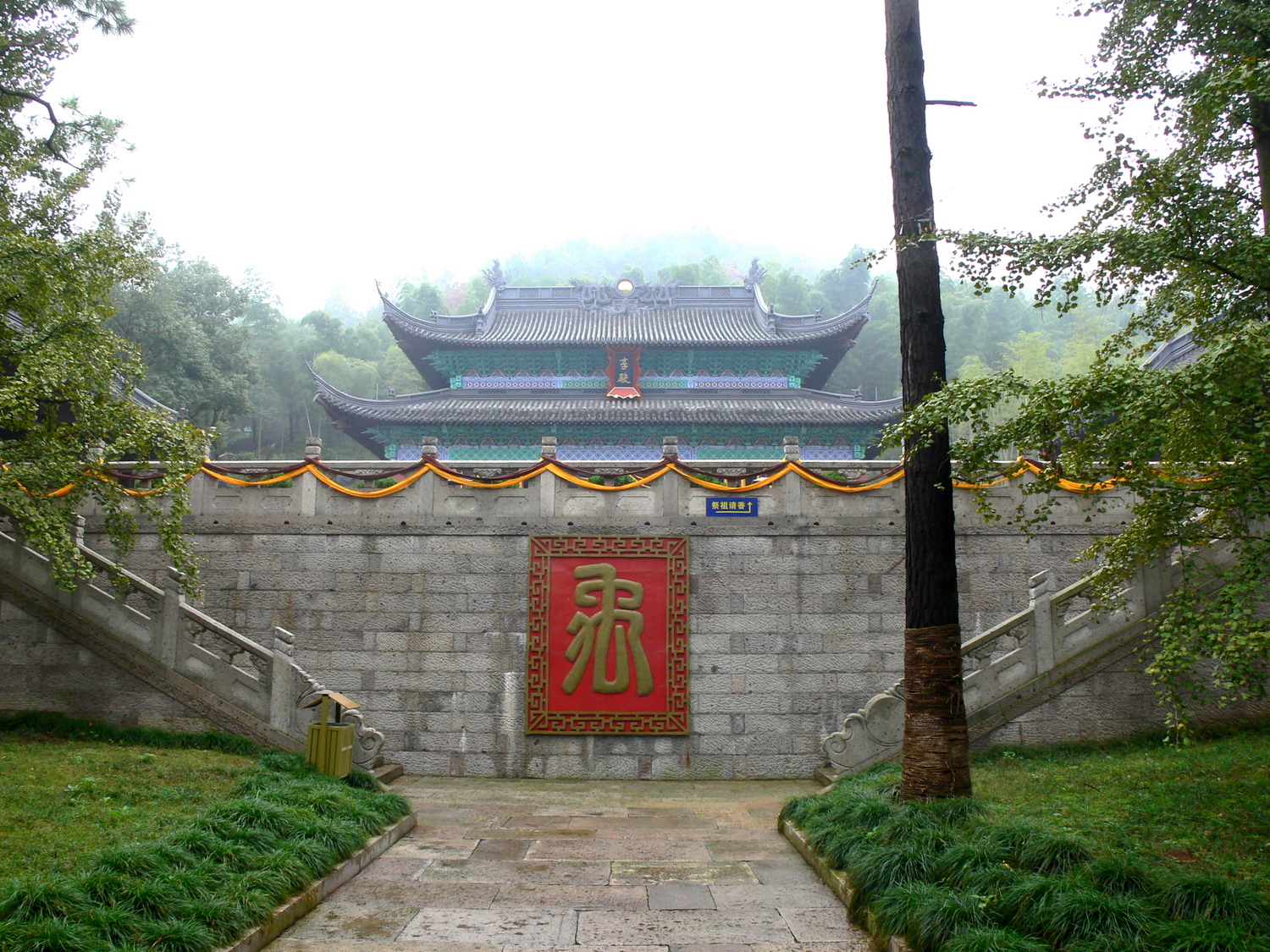
Temple grounds

According to the Bamboo Annals, Yu ruled the Xia Dynasty for forty-five years and, according to Yue Jueshu (越絕書), he died from an illness. It is said that he died at Mount Kuaiji, south of present-day Shaoxing, while on a hunting tour to the eastern frontier of his empire, and was buried there. The Yu Mausoleum (大禹陵) known today was first built in the Northern and Southern period (6th century) in his honor. It is located four kilometers southeast of Shaoxing city. Most of the structure was rebuilt many times in later periods. The three main parts of the mausoleum are the tomb, temple, and memorial of Yu. Sima Qian once "went to Kuaiji and explored the cave of Yu". The tomb faces east and west and has a grate gate, a canal and a pavilion for the Great Yu Tomb. In many statues he is seen carrying a hoe. A number of emperors in imperial times traveled there to perform ceremonies in his honor, notably Qin Shi Huang.

== Historicity ==
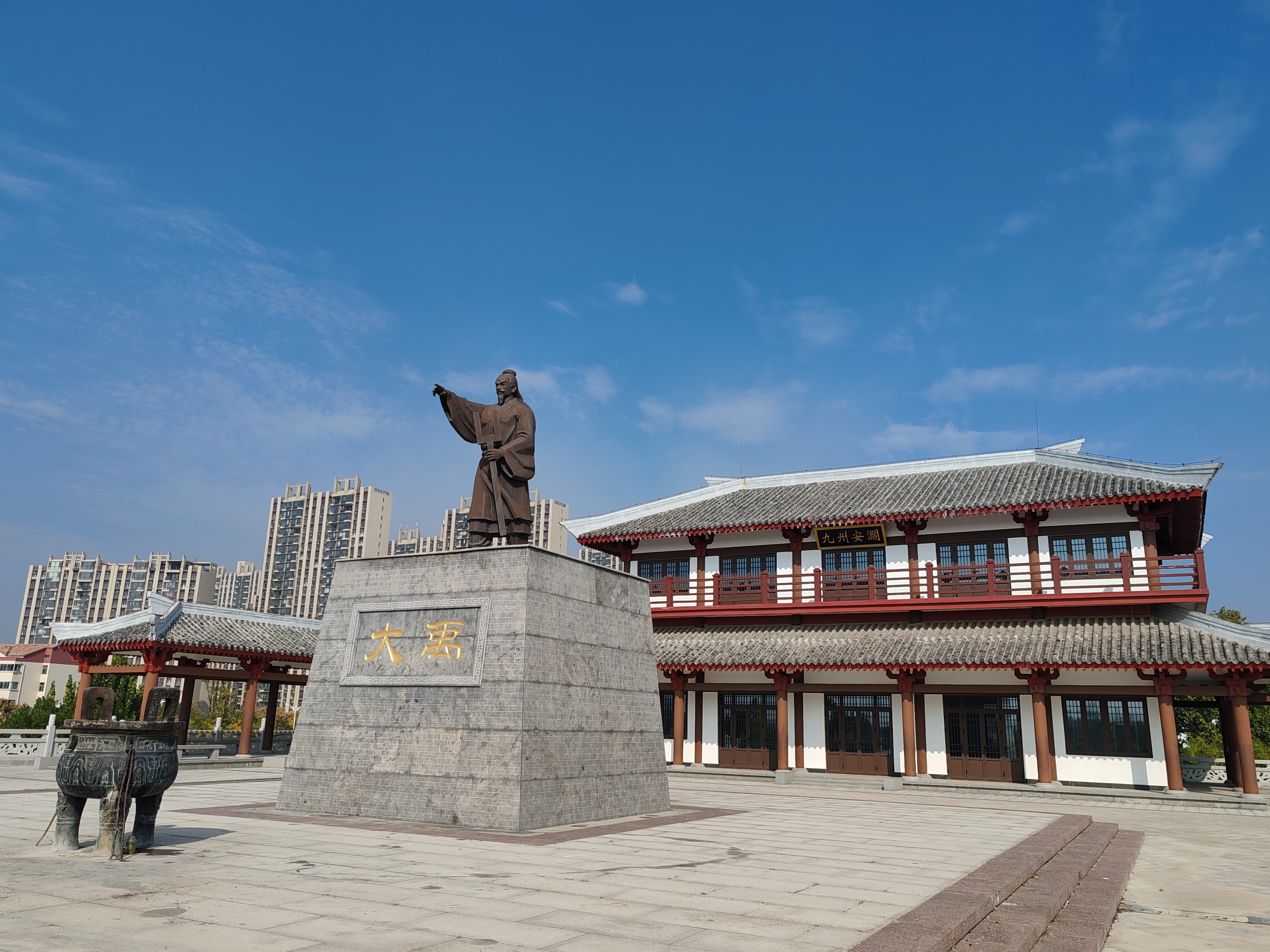
Statue of Yu near Si River in Yanzhou, Shandong

There is no evidence suggesting the existence of Yu as a historical figure until several centuries after the invention of writing in China, during the Western Zhou dynasty—nearly a millennium after the traditional dating of his reign. What was eventually recorded in historiography consists of myth and legend. No inscriptions on artifacts dated to the supposed era of Yu, or the later oracle bones, contain any mention of him. The first archeological evidence of Yu comes from vessels made about a thousand years after his supposed death.

During the early 20th century, the Doubting Antiquity School of historiography theorized that Yu was not a person in the earliest legends, but rather a god or mythical beast who was connected with water, and possibly with the mythical Dragon Kings and their control over water. According to this theory, Yu was represented on ceremonial bronzes by the early Xia people, and by the beginning of the Zhou dynasty, the legendary figure had morphed into the first man, who could control water, and it was only during the Zhou Dynasty that the legendary figures that now precede Yu were added to the orthodox legendary lineage. According to the Chinese legend Yu the Great was a man-god.

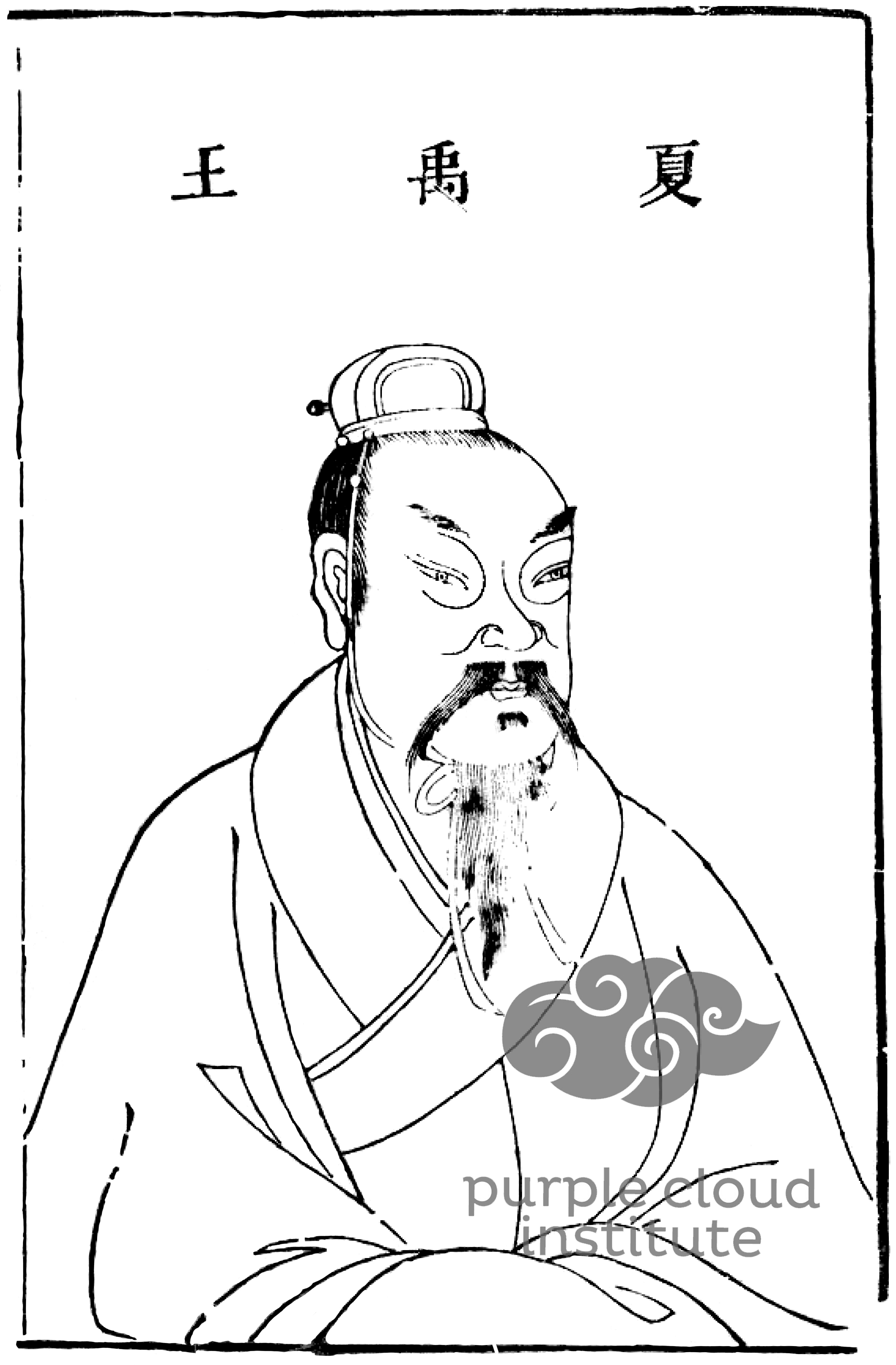
Portrait of Yu, the Great

Some scholars suggest that Yu was originally a nature spirit. Chen Shuguo states that Yu was originally worshipped not in temples, but outside in jiao rituals, just as it was done with other earth deities. Kominami Ichiro also links Yu with the earth altar, she.

The first record of Yu as a cosmic creator and lineage progenitor comes from Bin Gong xu (豳公盪), cast during the Zhou dynasty in the 9th century BCE. There, Yu is celebrated as the founder of the Zhou dynasty, said to have initiated the annual sacrifices and that he was workshiped in the jiao ritual. Other inscriptions, such as the Shijing (诗经) and Guoyu (国语), usually brings forth Hou Ji (后稷) as the progenitor of the Zhou. The first known document to make the shift of the Zhou progenitors was Zuo Zhuan (左傳), where Yu, the responsible for controlling the flood, chases away Yu, one of the Dragon Kings, commonly associated in Chinese mythology with the water element. The writing also brings forth the earth spirit as Gou Long (句龍), that literally translates to "Hooked Dragon".

Another mythological character that resembles Yu is Liu Lei. He became famous during the Xia dynasty for being able to raise and feed dragons, an art practiced by Emperor Shun (帝舜).

Archaeological evidence of a large outburst flood at Jishi Gorge on the Yellow River has been dated c. 1920 BC. This coincides with new cultures all along the Yellow River. The water control problems after the initial flooding could plausibly have lasted for some twenty years. Wu and coauthors suggest that this supports the idea that the stories of Yu the Great may have originated from a historical person.

== Legacy ==
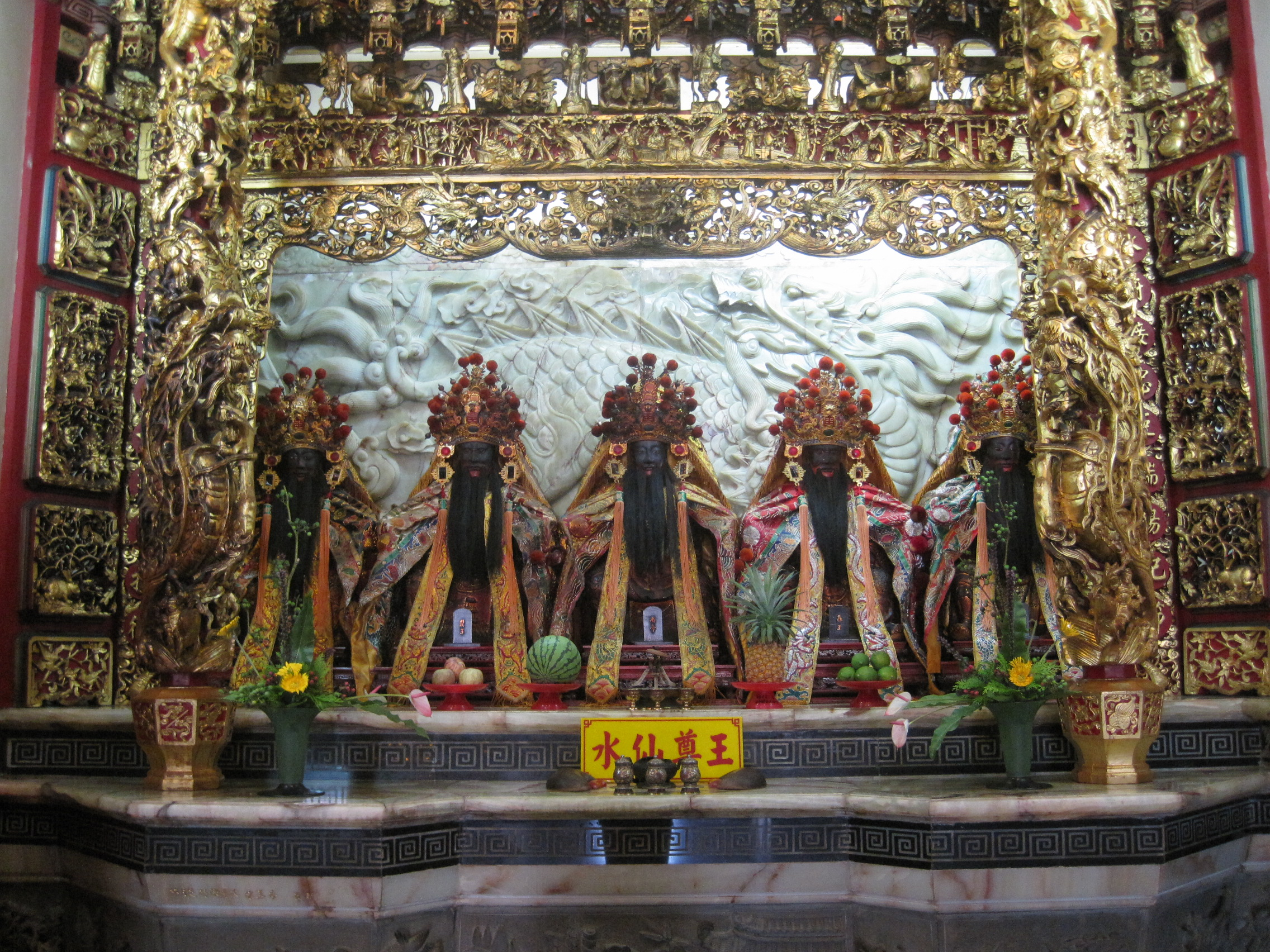
Yu and his fellow kings of the water immortals in a shrine at the Tianhou Temple in Tainan, Taiwan

Yu was long regarded as an ideal ruler and kind of philosopher king by the ancient Chinese. Beichuan, Wenchuan, and Dujiangyan in Sichuan have all made claims to be his birthplace.

He was also perceived as a deity or involved in ritual ceremonies to other deities. During the Zhou dynasty, it was common to perform the ritual of "Steps of Yu" before going on a journey or exiting a gate. Yu was also considered the "First Farmer" in some communities, such as Bin. Girls performed an annual sacrifice, where meat and ale were set out in front of a silo and the Steps of Yu were performed three times. According to Rong Cheng Shi (容成氏), Yu was responsible for creating the cardinal flags used during the "Great Pay Back" sacrifices to Shangdi. The same flags are mentioned in Shang Shu as being used to celebrate Yu's achievements.

Owing to his involvement in China's mythical Great Flood, Yu also came to be regarded as a water deity in Taoism and Chinese folk religion. He is the head of the "Five Kings of the Water Immortals" honored in shrines in Mazu temples as protectors of ships in transit.

His personal name is written identically to a Chinese surname, a simplification of the minor polity of Yu (鄅國) in present-day Shandong. Its people carried this lineage name forward after Yu was conquered by the state of Lu during the Spring and Autumn period.

== See also ==
- List of Chinese monarchs
- Family tree of ancient Chinese emperors
- Yubu
- Rishu
- Wuzhiqi

Yu the Great Xia dynasty
Regnal titles
Preceded by Shun	King of China	Succeeded by Qi
