= Chinese mythological geography =

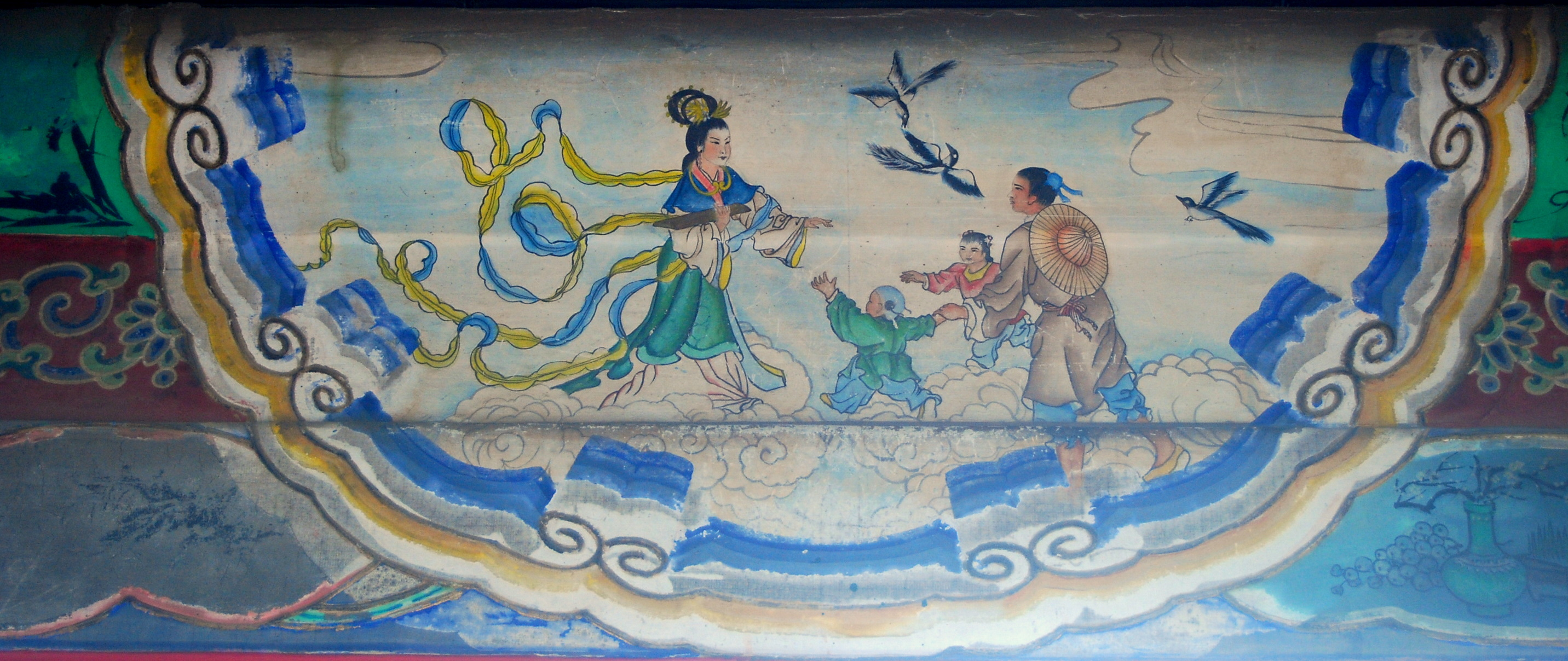
Magpie Bridge (Queqiao), crossing the Silver River (Milky Way), one of the famous mythological locations of Chinese mythology, in a mural decorating the Long Corridor of the Summer Palace, in Beijing.

Chinese mythological geography refers to the related mythological concepts of geography and cosmology, in the context of the geographic area now known as "China", which was typically conceived of as the center of the universe. The "Middle Kingdom" thus served as a reference point for a geography sometimes real and sometimes mythological, including lands and seas surrounding the Middle Land, with mountain peaks and sky (Heaven or heavens) above, with sacred grottoes and an underworld below, and even sometimes with some very abstract other worlds.

== Mythological geography of China ==
"Chinese mythology" refers to mythology associated with the geographic area now known as "China", and in traditional Chinese mythology often known as the "Middle Kingdom". Chinese mythology includes many varied myths from regional and cultural traditions. Chinese mythology is far from monolithic, not being an integrated system, even among just Han people. Chinese mythology is encountered in the traditions of various classes of people, geographic regions, historical periods including the present, and from various ethnic groups.

China is the home of many mythological traditions, including that of Han Chinese and their Huaxia predecessors, as well as Tibetan mythology, Turkic mythology, Korean mythology, and many others. The study of Chinese mythology tends to focus upon material in Chinese language. Much of the mythology involves exciting stories full of fantastic people and beings, the use of magical powers, often taking place in an exotic mythological place or time. Along with Chinese folklore, Chinese mythology forms an important part of Chinese folk religion. In these cases, Chinese mythological geography forms and informs these ideational processes.

== Cosmology ==
"Cosmology" refers to the entirety of the Earth and its environment, significantly including Heaven (or Sky), Earth, a mythological underworld, and other less Earth-oriented conceptual locations.

=== Earth ===
In ancient China, the Earth was held to be flat.

=== Heaven ===
"Heaven" (or "sky") refers to the universe outward of the Earth's surface and the concept of it as a liminal place that guides fate.

=== Underworld ===
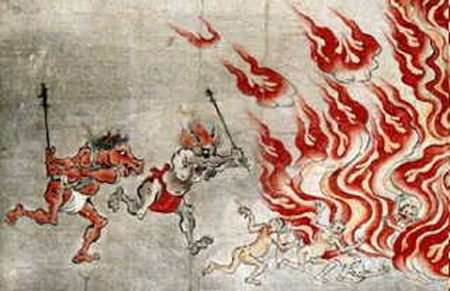
Ox-Head and Horse-Face in the Hell Scroll at Seattle Asian Art Museum

"Underworld" (or "Hell") refers to the universe located underneath the Earth's surface. Apparently this motif appears relatively late in the course of the development of Chinese mythology. The introduction of Buddhism certainly seems to have included a greater focus upon the fate of the soul and detailed depictions of a possible afterlife underground.

=== Otherworldly locations ===
"Non-Earth-based locations", include, for example the Pure Lands of Buddhism.

== Geography ==
=== Middle earth ===
The perspective of Chinese mythological geography tends to focus on the locus of those possessing the myths, as a "center" or "middle" area, based on land, with Sky above, Underworld below, and replete with mountains, seas, islands, and grottoes. Mythological locations tend to be replete with local inhabitants, of a mythological variety. Although Chinese mythological geography tends to focus on humans existing on a middle land territory of earth, a major motif is change, such as in Chinese flood myths.

==== Mountains ====
Various mountains present an appearance in Chinese mythology. The Kunlun Mountain(s) of mythology are associated with a number of deities, such as Xiwangmu, Yu Shi, various shamans, and xian immortals.

===== Example =====
As the mythology related to the Kunlun developed, it became influenced by the later introduction of ideas about an axis mundi from the cosmology of India. The Kunlun became identified with (or took on the attributes of) Mount Sumeru.

==== Grottoes ====
The counter feature to the holy or sacred mountains and peaks were the grotto-heavens, and various grottoes appear in Chinese mythological landscape. Sometimes sacred grottoes are associated with sacred mountains; and both may correspond to actual geolocations, but with an overlay of mythological geography.

==== Seas ====
Various seas or oceans present an appearance in Chinese mythology. Sometimes "the Sea" appears in a generic way, or in a directionally designated way such, as in the Jingwei story involving the Eastern Sea. Often a Dragon King was located in a sea, appropriately palaced. Sometimes sea and dry land were thought to alternate, as in the case of the Mulberry Fields and the sea related in the story of Magu.

==== Rivers ====
Various rivers appear in Chinese mythology.

===== Example =====
Various mythological geography is associated with the Red River, including one or more of the eight mountain pillars, especially the rivers thought to flow from or surround (mythological) Kunlun Mountain, the Weak River, the Black River, and intervening terrain, such as the Moving Sands. Jade Mountain was also in the vicinity.

==== Islands ====
Various islands present an appearance in Chinese mythology.

=== Inhabitants and other features ===
The inhabitants and features of Chinese mythological geography add life and interest to the whole subject, and contribute toward more complete mythological narratives. Examples include mythological plants, animals, humans, other beings, magical jewels, weapons and other objects.

=== Philosophers ===
There were a number of schools of thought about Chinese cosmology. Very few pieces of information are known about the Suan Ye school, except that its followers believed the stars and the sun moved on their own in space. Another philosophical school held that the universe was a cosmic egg, the sky was a painting on the top half of the shell, and that the flat Earth floated on top of water that dominated the bottom half. An older tradition, Zhou Bei, taught that the sky was a concave bowl that rotated.

== See also ==
- Category:Locations in Chinese mythology
- Chinese mythology
- Classic of Mountains and Seas
- Four Mountains
- Moving Sands
- River of Heaven

== References cited ==
- Bellingham, David; Whittaker, Clio; Grant, John (1992). Myths and Legends. Secaucus, New Jersey: Wellfleet Press. p. 132. ISBN 1-55521-812-1. OCLC 27192394.
- Christie, Anthony (1968). Chinese Mythology. Feltham: Hamlyn Publishing. ISBN 0600006379.
- Yang, Lihui; An, Deming; Turner, Jessica Anderson (2005). Handbook of Chinese Mythology. New York: Oxford University Press. ISBN 978-0-19-533263-6.

== References consulted ==
- Birrell, Anne (1993). Chinese Mythology. Baltimore: Johns Hopkins. ISBN 0-8018-6183-7.
- Ferguson, John C. (1928). "China". Mythology of All Races. Vol. VIII. Archaeological Institute of America.
- Qu Yuan (2011) [2nd century BCE]. Hawkes, David (ed.). The Songs of the South: An Ancient Chinese Anthology of Poems by Qu Yuan and Other Poets. Translated by Hawkes, David. London: Penguin Books. ISBN 978-0-14-044375-2.
- Latourette, Kenneth Scott (1947). The Chinese: Their History and Culture (Third Revised ed.). New York: Macmillan.
- The I Ching: The Book of Changes. Translated by Legge, James (Second ed.). New York: Dover. 1963 [1899]. LCCN 63-19508.
- Paludan, Ann (1998). Chronicle of the Chinese Emperors: The Reign-by-Reign Record of the Rulers of Imperial China. New York: Thames and Hudson. ISBN 0-500-05090-2.
- Schafer, Edward H. (1963). The Golden Peaches of Samarkand. Berkeley: University of California Press.
- Sheppard, Odell (1930). The Lore of the Unicorn -- Myths and Legends. London: Random House UK. ISBN 0-09-185135-1.
- Siu, R. G. H. (1968). ""Preface" and "Introduction"". The Man of Many Qualities: A Legacy of the I Ching. Cambridge: Michigan Institute of Technology Press. LCCN 68018242.
- Strassberg, Richard E., ed. (2018). A Chinese Bestiary: Strange Creatures from the GUIDEWAYS THROUGH MOUNTAINS AND SEAS. Translated by Strassberg, Richard E. Berkeley: University of California Press. ISBN 978-0-520-29851-4.
- Wu, K. C. (1982). The Chinese Heritage. New York: Crown Publishers. ISBN 0-517-54475X.
