= List of Chinese mythology =

Listicles of Chinese mythology

This article is a list of topics in Chinese mythology. Chinese mythology is mythology that has been passed down in oral form or recorded in literature from the area now known as China. Chinese mythology includes many varied myths from regional and cultural traditions. Chinese mythology is far from monolithic, not being an integrated system, even among Han people. Chinese mythology is encountered in the traditions of various classes of people, their Huaxia predecessors, Tibetan mythology, Turkic mythology, Korean mythology, and many others. However, the study of Chinese mythology tends to focus upon material in the Chinese language. Much of the mythology involves exciting stories full of fantastic people and beings, the use of magical powers, often taking place in an exotic mythological place or time.

Like many mythologies, Chinese mythology has in the past been believed to be, at least in part, a factual recording of history. Along with Chinese folklore, Chinese mythology forms an important part of Chinese folk religion (Yang et al 2005, 4). Many stories regarding characters and events of the distant past have a double tradition: ones which present a more historicized or euhemerized version and ones which presents a more mythological version (Yang et al 2005, 12–13). Many myths involve the creation and cosmology of the universe and its deities and inhabitants. Some mythology involves creation myths, the origin of things, people and culture. Some involve the origin of the Chinese state. Some myths present a chronology of prehistoric times, many of these involve a culture hero who taught people how to build houses, or cook, or write, or was the ancestor of an ethnic group or dynastic family. Mythology is intimately related to ritual. Many myths are oral associations with ritual acts, such as dances, ceremonies, and sacrifices.

== Major sources and concepts ==
- Shanhaijing, or Classic of Mountains and Seas
- shenmo genre of vernacular fiction revolve around gods and monsters. Important mythological fiction, seen as definitive records of these myths, include:
- Verse poetry associated with the ancient state of Chu such as "Li Sao", "Jiu Ge", and "Heavenly Questions", contained in the Chuci anthology, traditionally attributed to the authorship of Qu Yuan of Chu
- Fengshen Bang (Investiture of the Gods), a mythological fiction dealing with the founding of the Zhou dynasty
- Journey to the West attributed to Wu Cheng'en, published in the 1590s; a fictionalized account of the pilgrimage of Xuanzang to India to obtain Buddhist religious texts in which the main character encounters ghosts, monsters, and demons, as well as the Flaming Mountains
- Baishe Zhuan, a romantic tale set in Hangzhou involving a female snake who attained human form and fell in love with a man

== Presiding deities ==
The concept of a principal or presiding deity has fluctuated over time in Chinese mythology. Examples include:

- Shangdi, also sometimes Huángtiān Dàdì (皇天大帝), appeared as early as the Shang dynasty. In later eras, he was more commonly referred to as Huángtiān Shàngdì (皇天上帝). The use of Huángtiān Dàdì refers to the Jade Emperor and Tian.
- Yu Di (the Jade Emperor) appeared in literature after the establishment of Taoism in China; his appearance as Yu Huang dates back to beyond the times of Yellow Emperor, Nüwa, or Fuxi.
- Tian (Heaven) appeared in literature c.700 BCE, possibly earlier as dating depends on the date of the Shujing (Book of Documents). There are no creation-oriented narratives for Tian. The qualities of Tian and Shangdi appear to have merged in later literature and are now worshiped as one entity ("皇天上帝", Huángtiān Shàngdì) in, for example, the Beijing's Temple of Heaven.
- Nüwa (also referred to as Nü Kwa) appeared in literature no earlier than c.350 BCE. Her companion, Fuxi, (also called Fu Hsi) was her brother and husband. They are sometimes worshiped as the ultimate ancestor of all humankind, and are often represented as half-snake, half-human. It is sometimes believed that Nüwa molded human beings from clay for companionship. She repaired the sky after Gong Gong had damaged the pillar supporting the heavens.
- Pangu, written about by Taoist author Xu Zheng c.200 CE, was claimed to be the first sentient being and creator, “making the heavens and the earth.”

== Time periods ==
=== Three August Ones and Five Emperors ===
During or following the age of Nüwa and Fuxi came the age of the Three August Ones and Five Emperors. These legendary rulers ruled between c.2850 BCE to 2205 BCE, before the Xia dynasty. These rulers are generally regarded as morally upright and benevolent, examples to be emulated by latter-day kings and emperors. The list of names comprising the Three August Ones and Five Emperors vary widely among sources. One widely circulated and popular version is:

- The Three August Ones (Huáng)
  - Fuxi: companion of Nüwa
  - Yellow Emperor ("Huang Emperor"): often regarded as the first sovereign of the Chinese nation
  - Shennong ("Divine Farmer"): reputedly taught the ancients agriculture and medicine
- The Five Emperors (Dì)
  - Shaohao: leader of the Dongyi (Eastern Barbarians); his pyramidal tomb is in present-day Shandong
  - Zhuanxu: grandson of the Huang Emperor.
  - Emperor Ku: great-grandson of the Huang Emperor and nephew of Zhuanxu.
  - Yao: son of Ku; Yao's elder brother succeeded Ku, but he abdicated when found to be an ineffective ruler.
  - Shun: the successor of Yao, who passed over his own son and made Shun his successor because of Shun's ability and morality.

=== Great Flood ===
- Yu the Great
- Yellow River
- Yao
- Gun

== Important deities and mythological figures ==
- Deities with Buddhist appellations
  - Dizang: ruler of the ten hells
  - Four Heavenly Kings: four Buddhist guardian gods
  - Gautama Buddha (釋迦牟尼, Shìjiā móu ní)
  - Guanyin (also Kuanyin): bodhisattva associated with compassion
  - Laughing Buddha
- Baosheng Dadi: god of medicine
- Cangjie: had four eyes, invented Chinese characters
- Chang'e: moon goddess
- Chiyou: the tyrant who fought against the then-future Yellow Emperor
- City god
- Da Yu (Yu the Great): founder of the Xia dynasty famed for his introduction of flood control and upright moral character
- Daoji: compassionate folk hero known for wild and eccentric behaviour
- Dragon King
- Eight Immortals
  - Cao Guojiu
  - Han Xiangzi
  - Han Zhongli
  - He Xiangu
  - Lan Caihe
  - Lü Dongbin
  - Li Tieguai
  - Zhang Guolao
- Erlang Shen: possessed a third eye in the middle of his forehead that saw the truth
- Four Heavenly Ministers: heavenly kings of Taoist religion
  - Jade Emperor
  - Zi Wei Emperor
  - Great Emperor of Polaris
  - Houtu
- Fangfeng: the giant who helped fight flood, executed by Yu the Great
- Feng Meng: apprentice to Hou Yi, and his eventual murderer
- Gao Yao
- Goddess Golden Flower (金花聖母), popularly known in Cantonese as Kam Fa Neung Neung (金花娘娘)
- Gong Gong: water god/sea monster resembling a serpent or dragon
- Guan Yu: god of brotherhoods, martial power, and war
- Hànbá (旱魃)
- Houyi: archery deity; married to Chang'e, a moon goddess
- Kua Fu: a giant who wanted to capture the sun
- Kui Xing: god of examinations and an associate of the god of literature, Wen Chang
- Lei Gong: god of thunder
- Lung Mo: Chinese woman who became a goddess after raising five infant dragons
- Magu (deity): Daoist immortal, "Auntie Hemp"
- Mazu: goddess of the sea
- Meng Po: responsible for reincarnated souls forgetting previous lives
- Nezha: Taoist protection deity
- Nüwa: creator of humans
- Pangu: a deity that separated heaven and earth
- Siming: god of lifespan and fate
- Sun Wukong (also known as the Monkey King): protects mankind from demons and evil spirits
- Tam Kung: sea deity with the ability to forecast weather
- The Cowherd and Weaver Girl
- Three August Ones and Five Emperors: a collection of legendary rulers
- Three Pure Ones: the Taoist trinity
  - Daode Tianzun
  - Lingbao Tianzun
  - Yuanshi Tianzun
- Tu Di Gong: god of wealth and merit
- Tu Er Shen: managed the love and sex between homosexual men
- Wenchang Wang: god of culture and literature
- Wong Tai Sin: possessed healing power
- Wu Gang: endlessly cut down a self-healing bay laurel on the moon
- Xi Wangmu: Queen Mother of the West
- Xiang River goddesses (Xiangfei)
  - É huáng (娥皇)
  - Nǚ yīng (女英).
- Xihe, goddess of the sun
- Xingtian: headless giant decapitated by the Yellow Emperor as punishment for challenging him; his face is on his torso as he has no head
- Yanluowang: God of death
- Yuqiang: Yellow Emperor's descendant, god of north sea and wind
- Zao Jun: kitchen god
- Zhao Gongming (also Cai Shen): god of prosperity
- Zhong Kui: vanquisher of ghosts and evil beings
- Zhurong: god of fire

== Cosmology ==
=== Directional ===
- The Four Symbols of Chinese cosmology
  - Azure Dragon: east
  - Black Tortoise: north
  - White Tiger: west
  - Vermillion Bird: south

=== Mythological places ===
- Mount Buzhou (不周山): mythical mountain, generally considered to be one of the eight mountain pillars supporting the sky above the world (China). Damage by Gong Gong was thought to have caused China/the world to slant to the southeast, and thus the rivers to flow in that direction, and also displacing the Celestial Pole.
- Diyu (Chinese: 地獄): hell, the subterranean land inhabited by souls of dead humans and various supernatural beings.
- Eight Pillars: pillars between Earth and Heaven, supporting the sky.
- Feather Mountain: a place of exile during or just after the world flood
- Fusang: a mythical island interpreted to be Japan
- Heaven: an elaborate place up in the sky, the abode of the god (or God) Tian (also meaning "Heaven), also the home destination of various deities, divinities, shamans, and many more.
- Jade Mountain, a mythological mountain
- Kunlun Mountain: a mythical mountain, dwelling of various divinities, and fabulous plants and animals (there is also a real Kunlun Mountain or range).
- Longmen: dragon gate where carp can transform into dragons
- Mount Penglai: paradise; a fabled fairy isle on the China Sea
- Moving Sands: a semi-mythological place to the west of China (the real Taklamakan Desert to the west of or in China is known for its shifting sands).
- Red River: the mythological river in the west, near Kunlun
- Queqiao (鵲橋; Quèqiáo): bridge formed by birds flying across the Milky Way
- Tiantang: heaven
- Weak River: the mythological river in the west, near Kunlun, too light in specific gravity for floating or swimming
- Xuanpu (玄圃; Xuánpǔ): a mythical fairyland on Kunlun Mountain
- Yaochi (瑤池; Yáochí): the abode of immortals where the Queen Mother of the West lives.
- Yellow Springs (simplified Chinese: 黄泉; traditional Chinese: 黃泉; pinyin: Huángquán; Wade–Giles: Huang^{2}-ch'üan^{2}): (see Diyu)
- Youdu (Chinese: 幽都; pinyin: yōudū): the capital city of Di Yu, likewise under the ground

=== Concepts ===
- Cords of the Sky
- Sky Ladder/Pillars of the Earth

== Mythical creatures ==
=== Abstract ===
- Zhulong: the torch dragon, a solar deity
- The Four Fiends (四凶, Sì xiōng):
  - Hundun: chaos
  - Taotie: gluttony
  - Taowu: ignorance; provided confusion and apathy and made mortals free of the curiosity and reason needed to reach enlightenment
  - Qiongqi: deviousness

=== Birds ===
- Sanzuwu (三足烏; sānzúwū): three-legged crow that represented the sun birds shot down by Houyi
- Qing Niao (青鳥; qīngniâo): mythical bird and messenger of Xi Wangmu
- Fenghuang (鳳凰; fènghuáng): Chinese mythical bird, sometimes translated as "Phoenix"
- Bi Fang bird (畢方), a one-legged bird.
- Crane: linked with immortality, may be transformed xian
- Jiān/biyiniao (鶼/比翼鸟): a mythical bird with two heads, one male, one female. They have only one pair of wings, and they are inseparable. In the poem Chang Hen Ge(长恨歌), the emperor mourns for his dead lover, and states that he would be a biyiniao and stay with her forever.
- Jiguang (吉光; jíguāng)
- Jingwei: the mythical bird which tried to fill up the ocean with twigs and pebbles
- Jiufeng: nine-headed bird used to scare children
- Peng (鵬/鹏): giant mythical bird
- Shang-Yang (商羊): a rainbird
- Sù Shuāng (鷫鷞; su^{4}shuang^{3}): mythical bird like a crane; described as a water bird
- Vermilion Bird (朱雀): the icon of the south, sometimes confused with the Fenghuang
- Zhen: poisonous bird
- Lúan (鸾): mythical bird related to phoenix

=== Dragons ===
- Chi (螭): hornless dragon or mountain demon
- Dilong (地龍/地龙): the earth dragon
- Dragon King (various): one of the various kings – dragons ruling other dragons and often aquatic beings in general.
- Fuzanglong (伏藏龍/伏藏龙): the treasure dragon
- Jiaolong (蛟龍/蛟龙): dragon of floods and sea
- Shenlong (神龍/神龙): the rain dragon
- Teng (螣): a flying creature, sometimes considered a type of snake or dragon-snake
- Tianlong (天龍/天龙): the celestial dragon, sometimes associated with centipede qualities
- Yinglong (應龍/应龙): the water dragon, a powerful servant of Yellow Emperor
- Zhulong (烛龙/燭龍): the luminous red celestial "torch dragon" (only part-dragon)

=== Fishlike ===
- Mermaid (人魚)
- Kun (also Peng): giant monstrous fish form of the Peng bird.

=== Humanoid ===
- Kui: one-legged mountain demon or dragon who invented music and dance; also Shun's musical master
- Jiangshi: a reanimated corpse
- Ox-Head and Horse-Face
- Xiāo (魈; xiao^{1}): mountain spirit or demon
- Yaoguai: cultivated creatures or demoted gods

=== Mammalian ===
- Jiuwei Hu (九尾狐): Nine-tailed Fox
- Nian: lives under the sea or in mountains; attacks children
- Longma: winged horse similar to the Qilin
- Luduan: can detect the truth
- Xiezhi (also Xie Cai): the creature of justice said to be able to distinguish lies from truths; it had a long, straight horn used to gore liars
- Qilin: chimeric animal with several variations. The first giraffe sent as a gift to a Chinese emperor was believed to be the Qilin; an early Chinese painting depicts this giraffe replete with the fish scales of the Qilin. Qilin was believed to show perfect good will, gentleness, and benevolence to all righteous creatures.
- Pixiu: resembled a winged lion
- Rui Shi (瑞獅, Ruì Shī): guardian lions
- Huli jing: fox spirits
- Xīniú (犀牛): a rhinoceros; became mythologized when rhinoceroses became extinct in China. Depictions later changed to a more bovine appearance, with a short, curved horn on its head used to communicate with the sky
- Bai Ze: legendary creature said to have been encountered by the Yellow Emperor and to have given him a compendium listing all the demons in the world
- Dēnglóng / Hǒu (蹬龙/犼) : legendary creature worshipped as the greatest creature in China because it helps to drive away evil from its master, defend against ill-meaning wishes, takes away bad fortune, gathers and guards money.

=== Simian ===
- Chinese Monkey: warded off evil spirits; highly respected and loved
- Xiao (mythology), described as a long-armed ape or a four-winged bird

=== Snakelike and reptilian ===
- Ao: a giant marine turtle or tortoise
- Bashe: a snake reputed to swallow elephants
- Xiangliu: nine-headed snake monster
- White Serpent

== Mythical plants ==
- Fusang: a world tree, home of sun(s)
- Lingzhi mushroom: legendary fungus of immortality
- Peaches of Immortality: legendary peaches of immortality
- Yao Grass: grass with magical properties

== Mythical substances ==
- Xirang: the flood-fighting expanding earth

== Literature ==
- Imperial historical documents and Confucian canons such as Records of the Grand Historian, Lüshi Chunqiu, Book of Rites], and Classic History
- In Search of the Supernatural: 4th-century compilation of stories and hearsay concerning spirits, ghosts, and supernatural phenomena
- Strange Tales from a Chinese Studio, by Pu Songling, with many stories of fox spirits
- Zhiguai (誌怪): literary genre that deals with strange (mostly supernatural) events and stories
- Zi Bu Yu: a collection of supernatural stories compiled during the Qing dynasty

== Miscellaneous ==
- Agriculture in Chinese mythology
- Ba gua
- Bovidae in Chinese mythology
- Celestial bureaucracy
- Chinese astrology
- Chinese creation myth
- Chinese folk religion
- Chinese folklore
- Chinese legendary creatures
- Chinese mythology in popular culture
- Chinese spiritual world concepts
- Dog in Chinese mythology
- Fish in Chinese mythology
- Fuxi
- Geese in Chinese poetry
- Great Flood (China)
- Guanyin
- Horse in Chinese mythology
- Huangdi, the Yellow Emperor
- I Ching
- Imperial examination in Chinese mythology
- List of deities
- Nüwa
- Panhu
- Sanxing (deities)
- Simians (Chinese poetry)
- Teng
- Yuan Ke

== See also ==
- List of Legendary Animals from China
- Chinese gods and immortals
