= Red River (mythology) =

Mythological river in Chinese culture

The Red River or Red Water (Chinese: 赤水; pinyin: Chishui; lit. 'red water') is an important feature in the mythological geography of Chinese literature, including novels and poetry over a course of over two millennia from the Warring States to early Han dynasty era poetry of the Chuci onward. The Red River is one of the mythological rivers said to flow from Kunlun, a mythological land, with mountainous features. Translations into English include "Scarlet River".

== Mythical geography ==
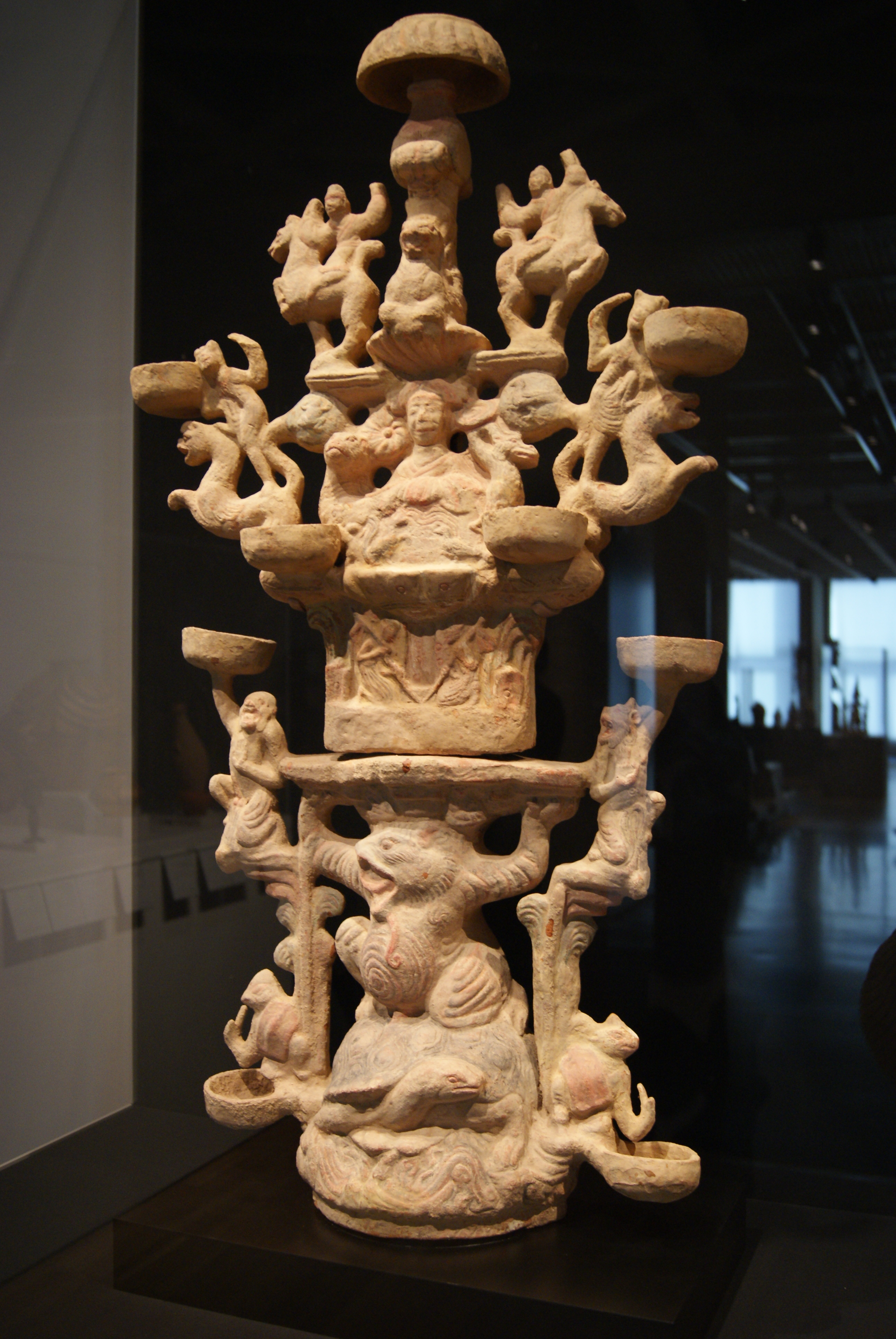
Oil lamp depicting the Queen of the West in her Heavenly Paradise together with relevant mythological geography and beings. Eastern Han ceramic unearthed at Chengdu, China.

Chinese mythology and imagination developed an extensive collection of ideas related to a mythical geography. Put together, these could form a picture of an exotic land usually thought to be located somewhere "in the west". Sometimes, as the areas to the west were charted, real geographical features would be named for mythological ones. It is also possible that the reverse process also occurred, as stories or legends formed from actual geographic phenomena were incorporated into mythical geography.

=== Nearby features ===
Various mythological geography is associated with the Red River, including one or more of the eight mountain pillars, especially the (mythological) Kunlun Mountain, the Weak River, the Black River, and intervening terrain, such as the Moving Sands. Jade Mountain was also in the vicinity.

== Ideas ==
As the mythology of the Red River and related mythical geography developed, it was influenced by ideas from the cosmology of India related to Mount Sumeru as an axis mundi, together with related cosmological features, such as rivers. India was the goal of the Buddhist priest Xuanzang and his companions in the Journey to the West, in which India became part of a fictional geography, as well as all the land between it and Tang China.

=== Poetry ===
The Red River is an allusion in various Chinese Classical poems, the early Chuci anthology included. Pulled through the sky by a team of dragons, Qu Yuan soars above all obstacle rivers and hostile terrain at will during his spirit journey as described in his poem "Li Sao". The Li Sao helped set the tone for other poems of the Chuci, which also allude to this type of mythical geography. In the "Li Sao", Qu Yuan, on a spiritual journey, which he describes as being pulled in a chariot by winged dragons, leaves the Ford of Heaven in the morning and reaches Kunlun by nightfall. On the way, in line 350 of the "Li Sao" (according to David Hawkes' line numbering), Qu Yuan comes to the banks of the Red Water (or River). This is one of the colored rivers flowing from Kunlun. Qu Yuan encounters this right after reaching the Moving Sands. Qu Yuan then surmounts the Red Water, or River, by summoning water dragons to make a bridge, then being conducted across by a Deity of the West (lines 351-352).

=== Western Paradise ===
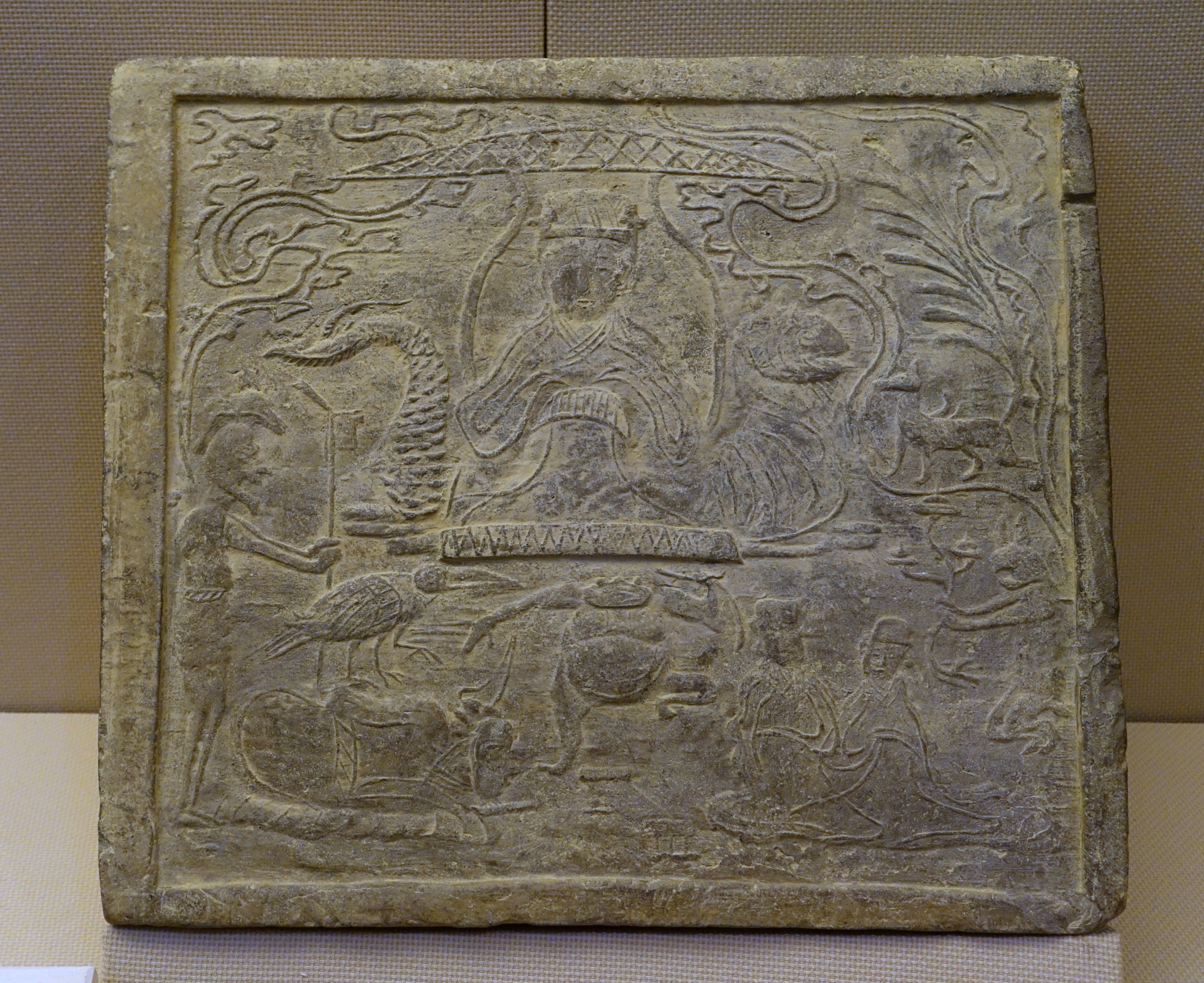
Queen of the West in her paradise. Eastern Han ceramic tomb tile. Unearthed at Chengdu, China.

The Red River was often thought to flow from Kunlun, sometimes located in the south seas area and sometimes considered to be the focal point of a Western Paradise. It is sometimes said that this Paradise was presided over by Xiwangmu, the Queen Mother of Meng Hao in the West, in later accounts was relocated to a palace protected by golden ramparts, within which immortals (xian) would feast, and inhabited by various other exotic beings, such as Wu or shamans, who were conceived of as people that practiced divination, prayer, sacrifice, rainmaking, and healing: they specialized in traveling by spirit flight, induced through the usual shamanic means.

== Shanhaijing ==
The Shanhaijing forms an interesting intersection between Red Water/Red River mythology and geography, because it the borderline between what is based on reality and what is purely imaginary is unclear in this book. The Shanhaijing discusses the Red River in chapter 16 (Yang 2005, 162).

== Real Red Rivers ==
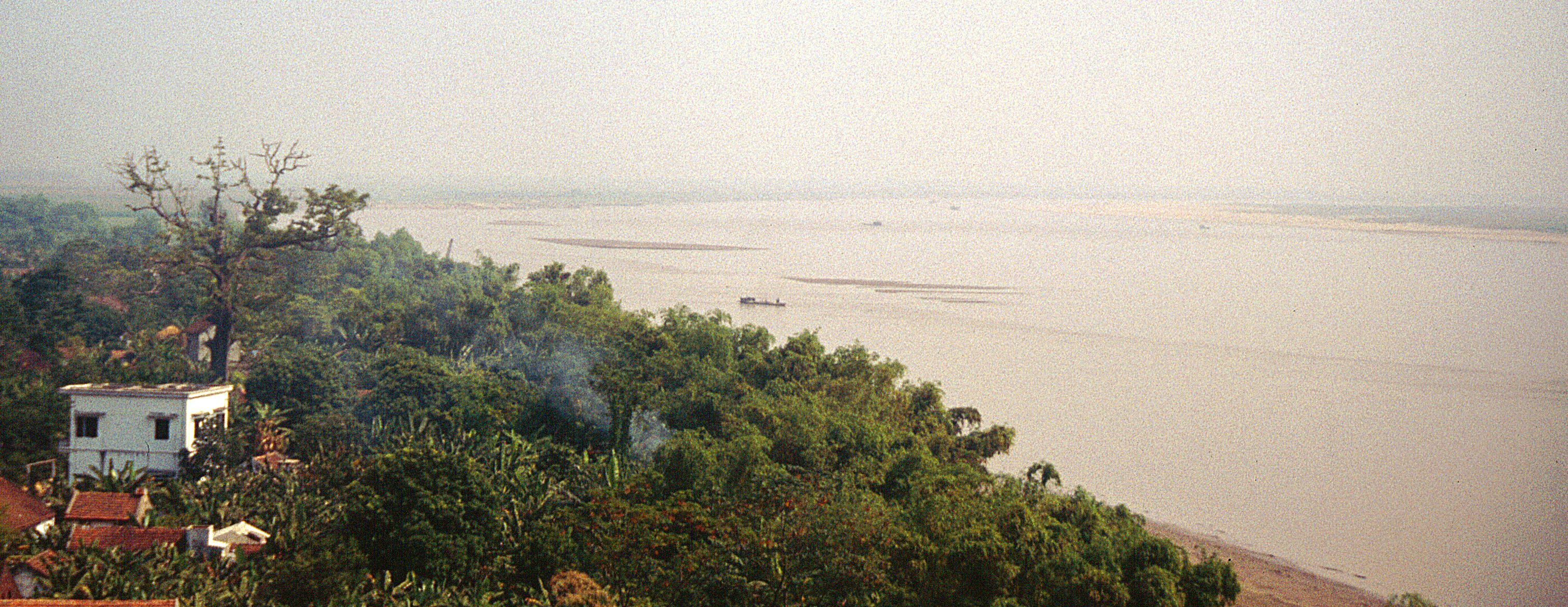
Red River in Hanoi, Vietnam

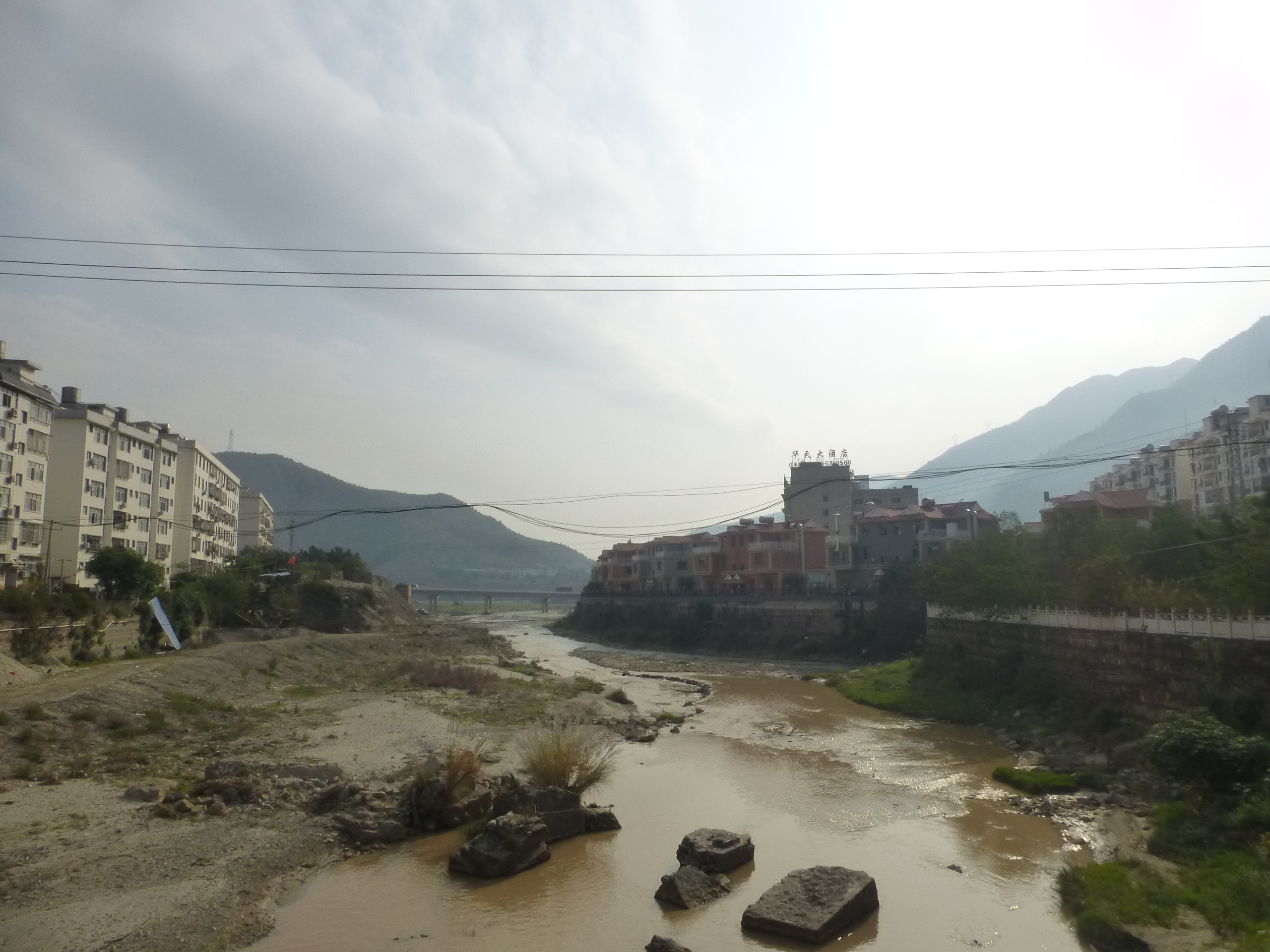
Red River in Yuanyang County, Yunnan

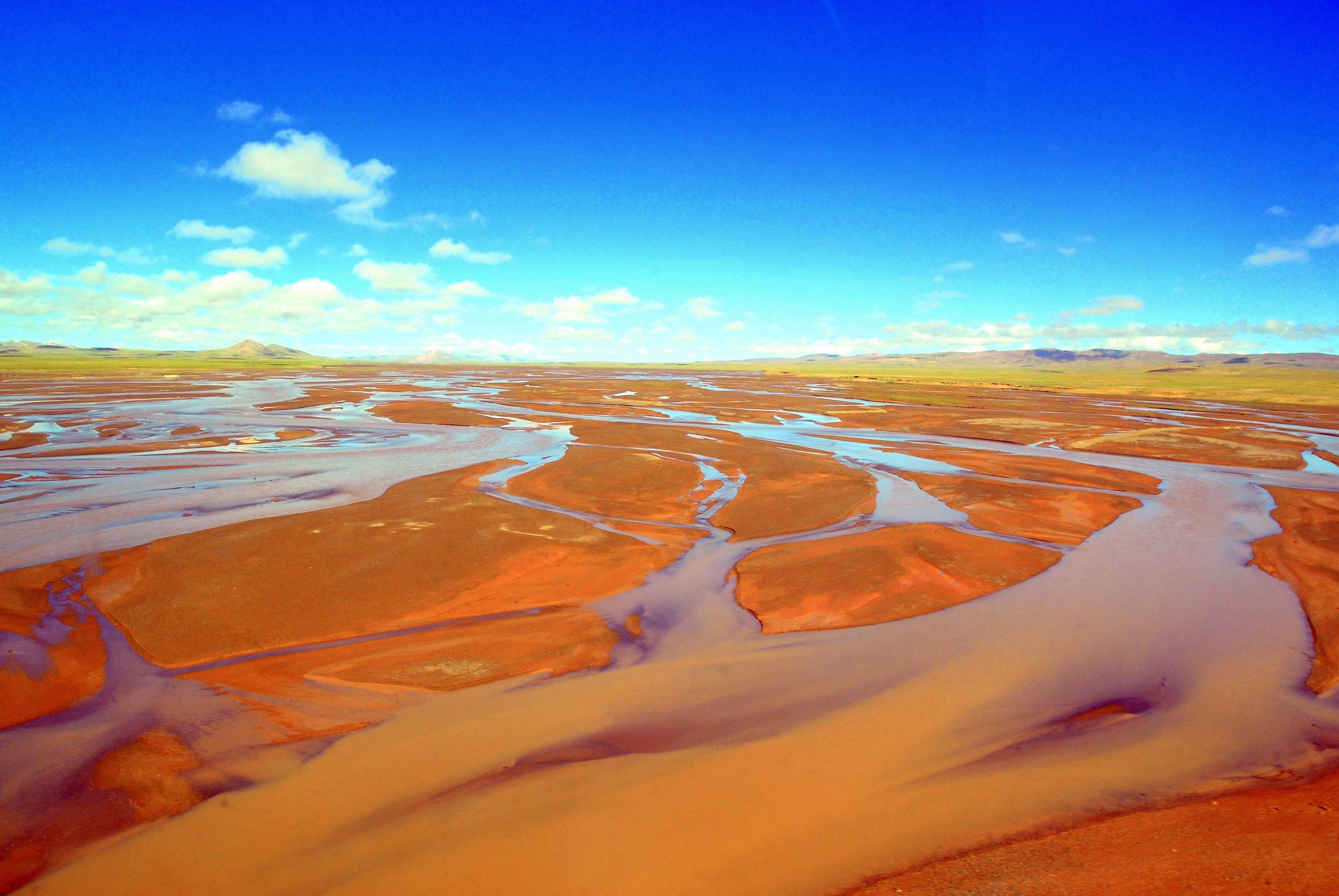
Yangzi at First Bridge

There are various modern rivers, or parts of rivers, in modern China known by a name meaning "Red River". In ancient times, the sources of these rivers often were not known by people down stream, and they often created mythological explanations for the sources of these rivers, such as mythological rivers flowing from "Kunlun". For example, the official source of the longest river in Asia: the Yangzi ("Yangtze", in older versions) main head water source is what is sometimes known in Mongolian as Ulaan Mörön, meaning "Red River" (it is also known by other names, such as the Tuotuo River). The use of "Yanngzi" to refer to the whole river is relatively recent, classically and in ancient times, this was only used to describe the lower reaches, with other names used for the upper stretches. Another of Asia's major rivers is also named the Red River (simplified Chinese: 红河; traditional Chinese: 紅河; pinyin: Hóng Hé; Vietnamese: Sông Hồng). With a source in the Hengduan Mountains, it flows into the ocean through northern Vietnam. The study of the relationship between real rivers and mythological rivers is complicated by the various name changes or variations in names for the real rivers over time, including often interchangeable Chinese characters for "water", "river", or "stream". Although the relationship between real and mythological geography such as rivers is not always clear, but one open to further study.

== See also ==
- Chinese mythological geography: general information
- Chinese mythology: a general article on Chinese mythology
- Classical Chinese poetry: a general article on Classical Chinese poetry
- Jinsha River
- List of Chinese mythology
- List of mythological Chinese rivers
- Weak River (mythology)
