= List of mythological Chinese rivers =

Mythological Chinese rivers are an important motif in Chinese mythology, forming part of a mythological geography. Among mythological Chinese rivers are:

- Weak River or Weak Water: a river or body of such low specific gravity that no one can swim nor anything float, not even a feather
- Red River or Red Water: one of the colored rivers flowing from Kunlun. In his poem "Li Sao", Qu Yuan crosses it on a bridge formed by dragons which he summons for the purpose
- White River or White Water: one of the colored rivers flowing from Kunlun
- Black River or Black Water: one of the colored rivers flowing from Kunlun
- Yellow River: a colored river flowing from mount Kunlun. Often identified with the real Yellow River. Once drunk dry by Kua Fu and also said to have been ruled by the deity He Bo
- Yellow Springs: another name for Hell

== See also ==
- Celestial bureaucracy
- Chinese astrology
- Chinese creation myth
- Chinese folk religion
- Chinese folklore
- Chinese legendary creatures
- Chinese mythology in popular culture
- Chinese spiritual world concepts
- Cicadas in mythology
- Dance of China
- I Ching
- Imperial examination in Chinese mythology
- List of deities
- List of Chinese mythology: a list version of this Wikipedia article
- Lo Shu Square
- Music of China
- Panhu
- Sanxing (deities)
- Simians (Chinese poetry)
- Teng
- Yuan Ke
