= Eight Pillars =

Concept in Chinese mythology

The Eight Pillars (Chinese: 八柱, bāzhù) also known as Eight Pillars of the Sky are a concept from Chinese mythology. Located in the eight cardinal directions, they are a group of eight mountains or pillars which have been thought to hold up the sky. They are symbolically important as types of axis mundi and cosmology. Their functions in mythology ranged from pillars which functioned to hold apart the Earth and the Sky (or Heaven), as ladders allowing travel between the two, and as the location of various paradises or wonderland with associated magical people, plants, and animals. The Eight Pillars are a central aspect to Chinese mythology, and also have been used extensively in poetic allusion. Some variations exist, such as only having four pillars.

== Places ==
Various mythological geography is associated with the Eight Pillars, including the eight mountain pillars themselves along with surrounding or intervening terrain, such as the Moving Sands. The eight mountain pillars include Kunlun, Jade Mountain, Mount Buzhou, and five more (Yang Lihui 2005: passim). Kunlun functions as a sort of ladder which could be used to travel between earth and Heaven. Accordingly, any person who succeeded in climbing up to the top of Kunlun would magically become an immortal spirit (Yang 2005: 160–162).

=== Buzhou Mountain ===
Buzhou was the defective mountain pillar. Having been damaged by Gonggong when he smashed his head into it (Tian, Zhaoyuan 2020: 8-10), it no longer separated the Earth and the Heaven for the proper distance. Bu-zhou was the northwest one (Hawkes, 1985 (2011): 94–95, 135–136, 323). It was said that after Heaven fell to the northwest, the starts, sun, and moon followed. And with this the Earth started to lean to the east (Tian, Zhaoyuan 2020: 8-10).

=== Kunlun ===
Kunlun Mountain has been described in various texts, as well as being depicted in art. Sometimes Kunlun appears as a pillar of the sky (or earth), sometimes appearing as being composed of multiple tiers (Yang 2005: 160), with the commonality of "mystery, grandeur, or magnificence" being emphasized in the mythological descriptions. The base of the Kunlun Mountain is said to penetrate as far into the earth, as its above-ground part proceeds towards the sky (Christie1968: 74). As the mythology related to the Kunlun developed, it became influenced by the later introduction of ideas about an axis mundi from the cosmology of India. The Kunlun became identified with (or took on the attributes of) Mount Sumeru. Another historical development in the mythology of Kunlun, (again with Indian influence) was that rather than just being the source of the Yellow River, Kunlun began to be considered to be the source of four major rivers flowing to the four quarters of the compass (Christie 1968:74).

=== Jade Mountain ===
Another of the Eight Pillars was Jade Mountain.

=== Associated geography ===
Various other mythological geography is associated with the Eight Pillars. This includes the four rivers flowing from Kunlun Mountain and the Moving Sands.

== Activities ==
Various activities took place at the eight pillars. For one, they were often thought of as reaching from Earth to Heaven; thus, climbing one of the pillars would allow one to reach Heaven from Earth.

== Inhabitants ==
The eight mountain pillars were favorite places for all sorts of characters to visit or dwell. This includes various deities, immortals, and shamans.

=== Deities ===
Various deities inhabited or visited one or more of the eight mountain pillars. These include Xiwangmu and others on Kunlun.

==== Queen Mother of the West (Xiwangmu) ====
Although not originally located on Kunlun, but rather on a Jade Mountain neighboring to the north (and west of the Moving Sands), Xiwangmu, the Queen Mother of Meng Hao in the West, in later accounts was relocated to a palace protected by golden ramparts, within which immortals (xian) feasted on bear paws, monkey lips, and the livers of dragons, served at the edge of the Lake of Gems. Every 6000 years the peaches which conferred immortality upon those who ate them would be served (except the time when they were purloined by Monkey King). Originally a plague deity with tiger teeth and leopard tail, she became a beautiful and well-mannered goddess responsible for guarding the herb of immortality (Christie 1968: 78–79).

=== Xian (Immortals) ===
The immortals, or xian, were Daoist immortals (humans who had metamorphosed into superhuman form). The xian were often seen as temporary residents, who visited by means of flying on the back of a magical crane or dragon.

==== Wu shamans ====
The Wu or shamans were people that practiced divination, prayer, sacrifice, rainmaking, and healing, generally through the use of spirit flight. They generally seem to have become immortals.

== Poetry ==
The Eight Pillars are a subject of poetic allusion from the ancient poems "Li Sao" and "Heavenly Questions" by Qu Yuan; and, on through later times, in Classical Chinese poetry. The immortals, or xian, were Daoist immortals (humans who had metamorphosed into superhuman form), which was presided over by Xiwangmu. The xian were often seen as temporary residents, who visited by means of flying on the back of a magical crane or dragon.

== Gallery ==
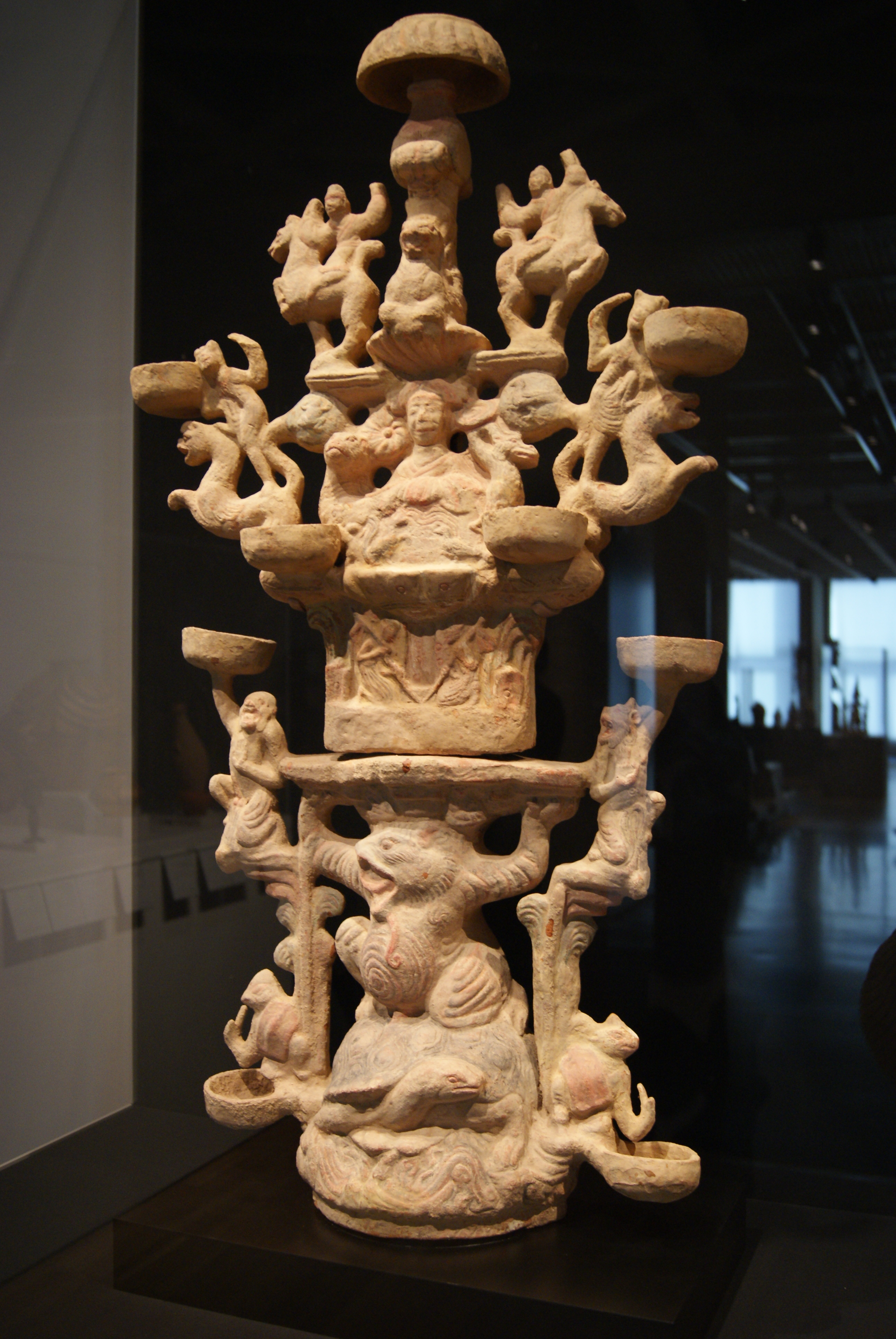
1st–2nd century lamp in the shape of Kunlun Mountain as the pillar of the sky, realm of the Queen Mother of the West (1st–2nd century CE)

== See also ==
- Axis mundi
- Chinese mythology: a general article on Chinese mythology
- Fusang: a giant tree, fulfilling similar functions to the mountain pillars
- Jade Mountain (mythology): another mythical mountain
- List of Chinese mythology
- List of mythological Chinese mountains
- Mount Buzhou: another mythical mountain, the damaged one of the eight pillars
- Moving Sands: western area bordering one or more of the mountains of the Eight Pillars
- Red River (mythology)
- Weak River: one of the mythological rivers flowing around Kunlun: it flowed with "water" so lacking in specific gravity that even a feather would not float. One of the obstacles faced by the Monk and Monkey in Journey to the West

== References cited ==
- Christie, Anthony (1968). Chinese Mythology. Feltham: Hamlyn Publishing. ISBN 0600006379.
- Hawkes, David, translation, introduction, and notes (2011 [1985]). Qu Yuan et al., The Songs of the South: An Ancient Chinese Anthology of Poems by Qu Yuan and Other Poets. London: Penguin Books. ISBN 978-0-14-044375-2
- Yang, Lihui, et al. (2005). Handbook of Chinese Mythology. New York: Oxford University Press. ISBN 978-0-19-533263-6
- Tian, Zhaoyuan; Ye, Shuxian; Qian, Hang (18 June 2020). Myths of the Creation of Chinese. Springer Singapore. pp. 8–10. ISBN 978-981-15-5927-3.
