= Weak River (mythology) =

Mythological river in Chinese culture

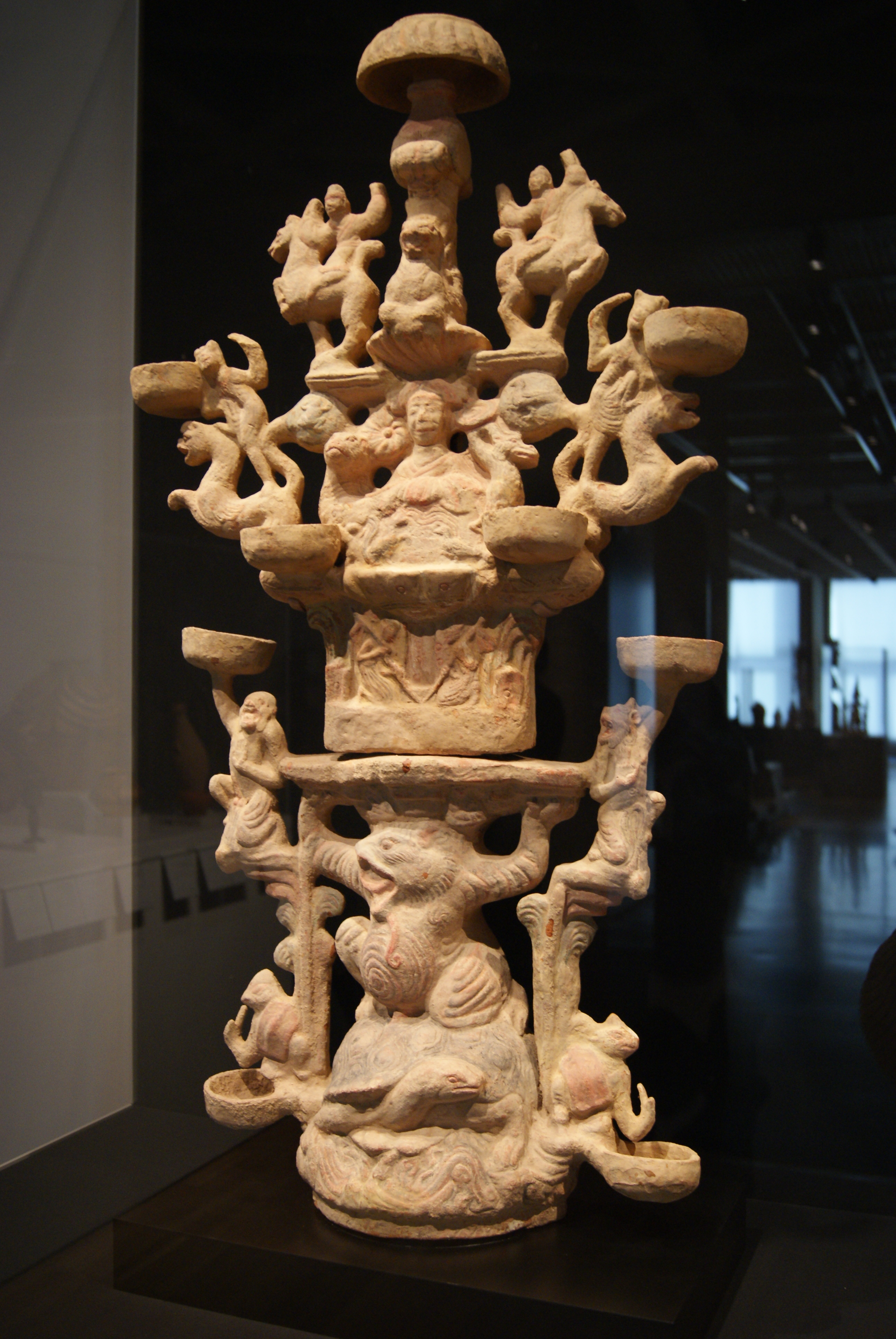
Oil lamp depicting the Queen of the West in her Heavenly Paradise together with relevant mythological geography and beings. Eastern Han ceramic unearthed at Chengdu, China.

The Weak River also known as the Weak Water or Ruoshui (Chinese: 弱水; lit. 'weak water') is an important feature in the mythical geography of Chinese literature, including novels and poetry over a course of over two millennia from the Warring States to early Han dynasty era poetry of the Chuci onward. The Weak River is one of the mythological rivers flowing near Kunlun, home of a Western Paradise. The Weak River flowed with "water" so lacking in specific gravity that even a feather would not float, thus being a protective barrier against the unworthy, who otherwise would profane the paradise on Kunlun, and perhaps even climb up to Heaven and disturb the deities and other inhabitants residing there. In the novel Journey to the West, the Weak Water River forms one of the obstacles the fictional version of the monk Xuanzang, the magic monkey Sun Wukong, and companions must cross over on their mission to fetch the Buddhist scriptures from India and return them to Tang China.

== Mythical geography ==
Chinese mythology and imagination developed an extensive collection of ideas.

=== Weak Water River ===
The Weak River, or Weak Water, was so-called because nothing could float in it.

=== Nearby features ===
Various mythological geography is associated with the Weak River, including one or more of the eight mountain pillars, especially the (mythological) Kunlun Mountain, the Red River, intervening terrain, such as the Moving Sands. Jade Mountain was also in the vicinity.

== Ideas ==
As the mythology of the Weak River and related mythical geography developed, it was influenced by ideas from the cosmology of India related to Mount Sumeru as an axis mundi, together with related cosmological features, such as rivers. Also India was the goal of the Buddhist priest Xuanzang and his companions in the Journey to the West.

=== Literature and poetry ===
==== Literature ====
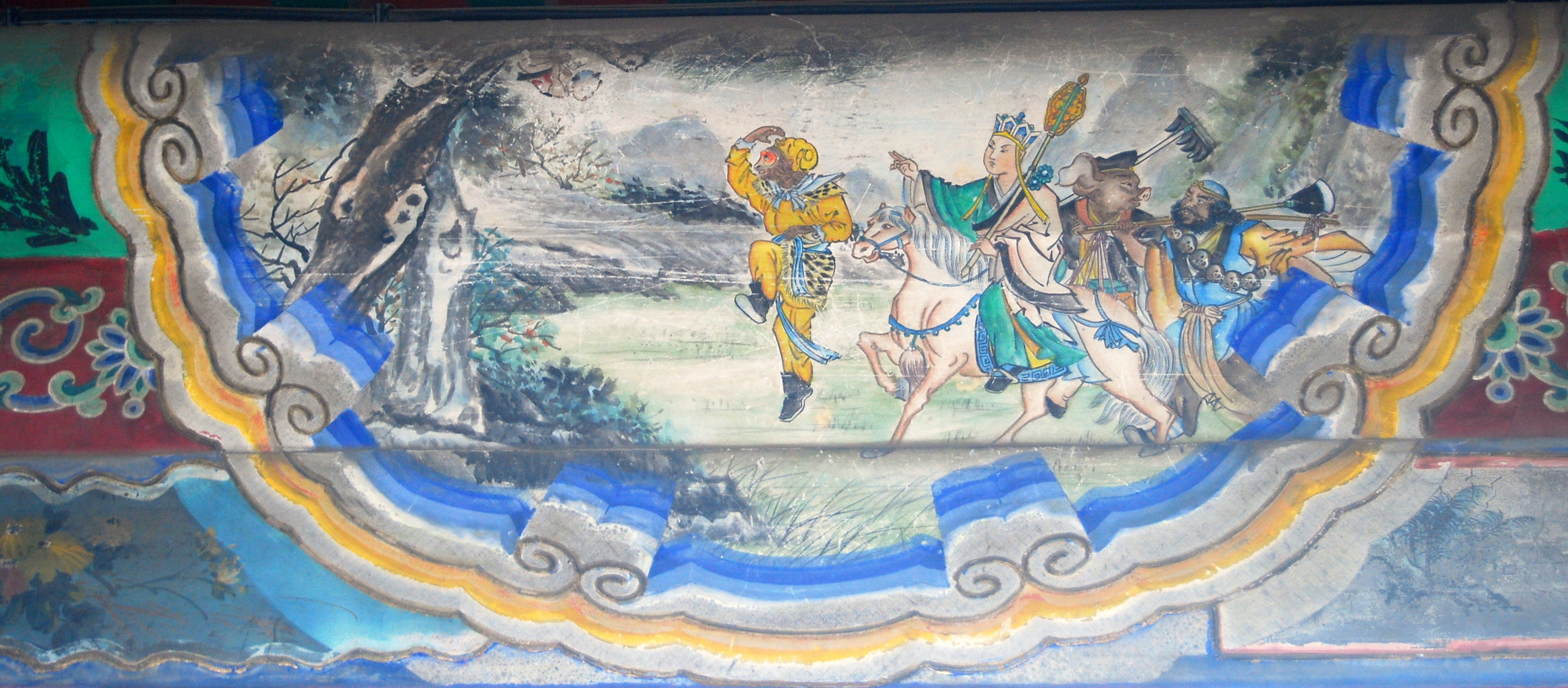
The companions in one episode of Journey to the Weet. Mural in the Long Corridor, a covered walkway in the Summer Palace in Beijing, China.

In the novel Journey to the West the Weak Water river forms one of the barriers on the way, one of the many difficult areas which the Xuanzang the Monk, Sun Wukong the Monkey, and their companions must cross over.

==== Poetry ====
The Weak Water River is an allusion in various Chinese Classical poems, the early Chuci anthology included. Pulled through the sky by a team of dragons, Qu Yuan soars above all obstacle rivers and hostile terrain at will during his spirit journey as described in his poem "Li Sao". The Li Sao helped set the tone for other poems of the Chuci, which also allude to this type of mythical geography. Although Qu Yuan is largely credited for the Chuci material, other authors are also known. "Alas That My Lot Was Not Cast" was written by Zhuang Ji also known as Yan Ji in the second century BCE. Also known as "Ai shi ming" this poem is an example of the use of the Weak Water River as an image, where in lines 15-22 the poet laments that he is not only irremediably separated from his lord due to earthly rivers which are wide and bridgeless, but that his desire to visit the Hanging Garden of Kunlun is not possible due to his inability to pass the barrier of the "rushing Weak Water". Apparently he was less worthy than Qu Yuan and chose to write a poem lamenting this.

=== Western Paradise ===
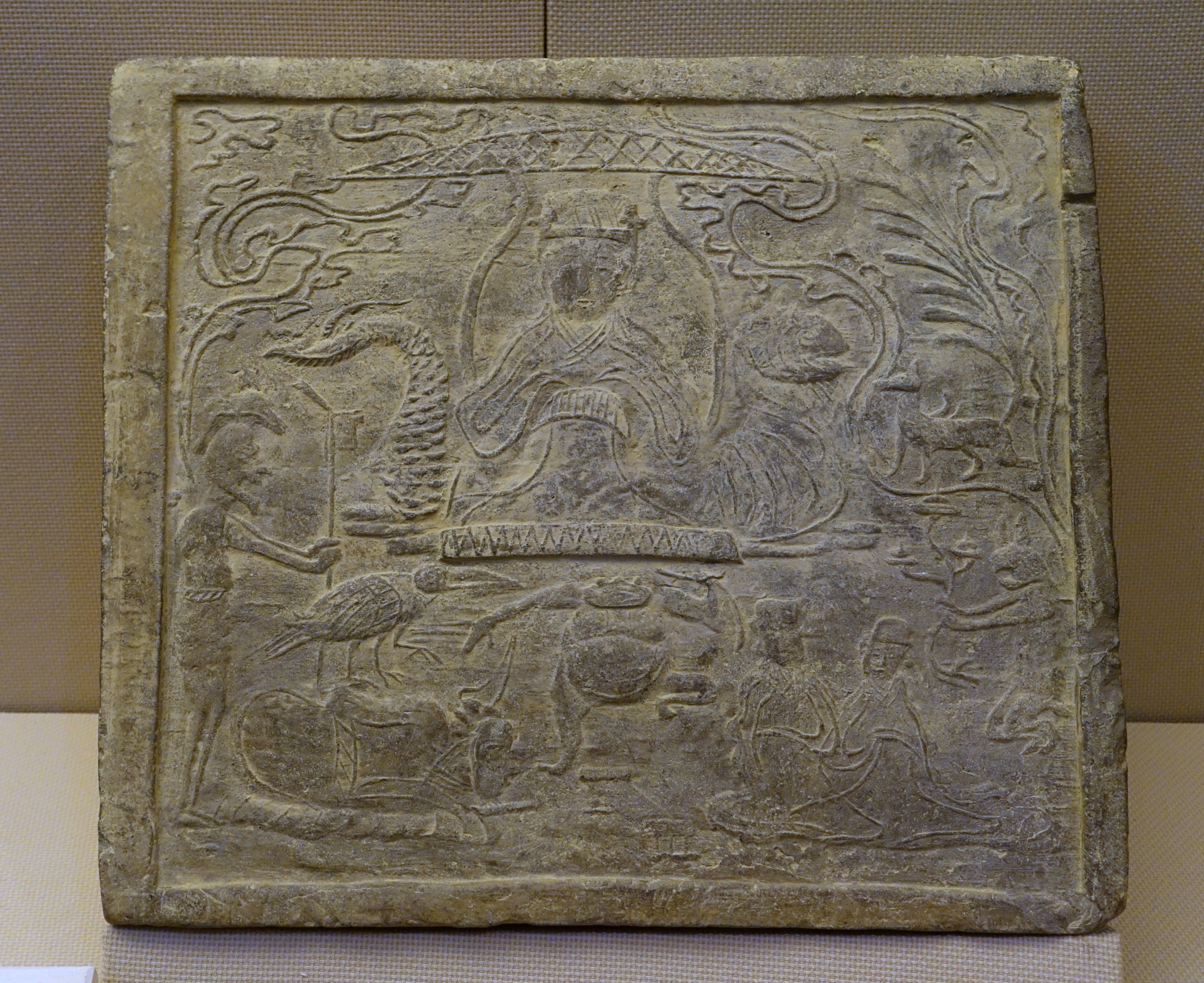
Queen of the West in her paradise. Eastern Han ceramic tomb tile. Unearthed at Chengdu, China.

The Weak River was often seen as a protective barrier against the profane and unworthy, protecting a Western Paradise. Often this Paradise was presided over by Xiwangmu, the Queen Mother of Meng Hao in the West, in later accounts was relocated to a palace protected by golden ramparts, within which immortals (xian) feasted on bear paws, monkey lips, and the livers of dragons, served at the edge of the Lake of Gems. Every 6000 years the peaches which conferred immortality upon those who ate them would be served (except the time when they were purloined by Monkey King). However, as a barrier The Weak Water River would be crossed over by those who were worthy, such as immortals (xian), humans who had metamorphosed into superhuman form, or those well on the Way to immortality. The xian were often seen as guests who visited by means of flying on the back of a magical crane or dragon. The Wu or shamans were people that practiced divination, prayer, sacrifice, rainmaking, and healing: they in specialized traveling by spirit flight, induced through the usual shamanic means.

== Real river ==
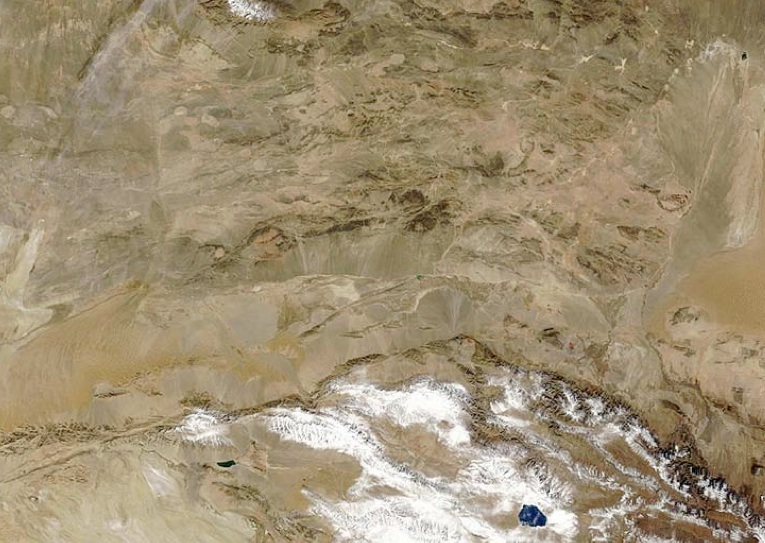
Taklimakan Desert, with real Ruo Shui visible as the faint green trace to the right of the satellite image.

There is a real, geographical Ruo Shui (Chinese: 弱水; lit. 'weak water' also Etsin Gol or Ruo He or Ejin River). This Ruoshui ("Weak River" was named for its seasonal weak flow in its lower reaches, while the mythological Weak River was named for the inability of the liquid substance constituting it to float any objects. Ruoshui begins as the Heishui (黑水, black water) on the north slopes of the Qilian Mountains, a major river system of northern China, then flowing approximately 630 kilometres (390 mi) from its headwaters on the northern Gansu side of the Qilian Mountains, on a spur of the Kunlun range, north-northeast into the endorheic Juyan Lake in the Badain Jaran Desert, forming one of the largest inland deltas or alluvial fans in the world, its drainage basin covering about 78,600 square kilometres (30,300 mi^{2}) in Gansu and Inner Mongolia: on the other hand, the mythological Ruoshui River circles Kunlun and is the scene for all sorts of activities by deities, immortal, would-be immortals, and so on, and generally exists in an alternate reality of culture. However, both Ruo Shui rivers are directionally located in a somewhat northern and western way.

== See also ==
- Axis mundi
- Chinese mythology: a general article on Chinese mythology
- Classical Chinese poetry: a general article on Classical Chinese poetry
- Fusang: a giant tree, fulfilling similar functions to the mountain pillars
- Jade Mountain (mythology): another mythical mountain
- List of Chinese mythology
- List of mythological Chinese rivers
- Mount Buzhou: another mythical mountain, the damaged one of the eight pillars
- Moving Sands: western area bordering one or more of the mountains of the Eight Pillars
- Red River (mythology)

== References cited ==
- Christie, Anthony (1968). Chinese Mythology. Feltham: Hamlyn Publishing. ISBN 0600006379.
- Qu Yuan (2011) [1985]. Hawkes, David (ed.). The Songs of the South: An Ancient Chinese Anthology of Poems by Qu Yuan and Other Poets. Translated by Hawkes, David. London: Penguin Books. ISBN 978-0-14-044375-2.
- Yang, Lihui, ed. (2005). Handbook of Chinese Mythology. New York: Oxford University Press. ISBN 978-0-19-533263-6.
- Wu Cheng'en (1980) [c. 1592]. Yu, Anthony C. (ed.). The Journey to the West. Translated by Yu, Anthony C. Chicago: The University of Chicago Press. ISBN 978-0-226-97150-6.
