= Mount Buzhou =

Mythological mountain in Chinese mythology

- Chinese: 不周山
Transcriptions
Standard Mandarin
- Hanyu Pinyin: Bùzhōushān
- Wade–Giles: Pu-chou Shan

Mount Buzhou (不周山 lit. "Unrevolving Mountain") was an ancient Chinese mythological mountain which, according to old texts, lay to the northwest of the Kunlun Mountains, in a location today referred to as the Pamir Mountains. It is the mountain said to have supported the heavens, against which the Chinese water god Gonggong smashed his head in a fit of anger, requiring the goddess Nüwa to repair the sky. Nevertheless, once the spacer between the Earth and Sky was damaged, the land of China was permanently tilted to the southeast, causing all the rivers to flow in that same direction.

== In mythology ==
The world was conceived as being divided into eight directional divisions, at each of which a mountain pillar supported the sky. Bu-zhou was the northwest one (Hawkes 2011, pp. 94–95, 135–136, 323).

In mythological geography, Buzhou Mountain was located near Jade Mountain (Yang 2005, pp. 161–162, 206).

== In poetry ==
The mountain is mentioned in the Classic of Mountains and Seas and is a location mentioned by Qu Yuan in his classic poem Li Sao, one of the Songs of Chu (line 355), which the poet visits during a shamanic, spiritual journey. Li Bo and other poets also make allusions or references to Buzhou. Former Chinese leader Mao Zedong also refers to Mount Buzhou in his 1931 poem "Against the First Encirclement Campaign".

== See also ==
- Eight Pillars: eight mountain/pillars located in the eight cardinal directions supporting the sky
- Moving Sands: in mythological geography, a dangerous place to be traversed in route to or from Mount Bouzhou from the central China
- Sacred mountains of China
- Phoenix Mountain in Hebei, said to have been the place where Nüwa repaired the sky
- Feather Mountain, a mythological mountain
- Jade Mountain, a mythological mountain
- Kunlun Mountain, a mythical mountain, dwelling of various divinities, and fabulous plants and animals
- Mount Penglai, paradise; a fabled fairy isle on the China Sea
