= Moving Sands =

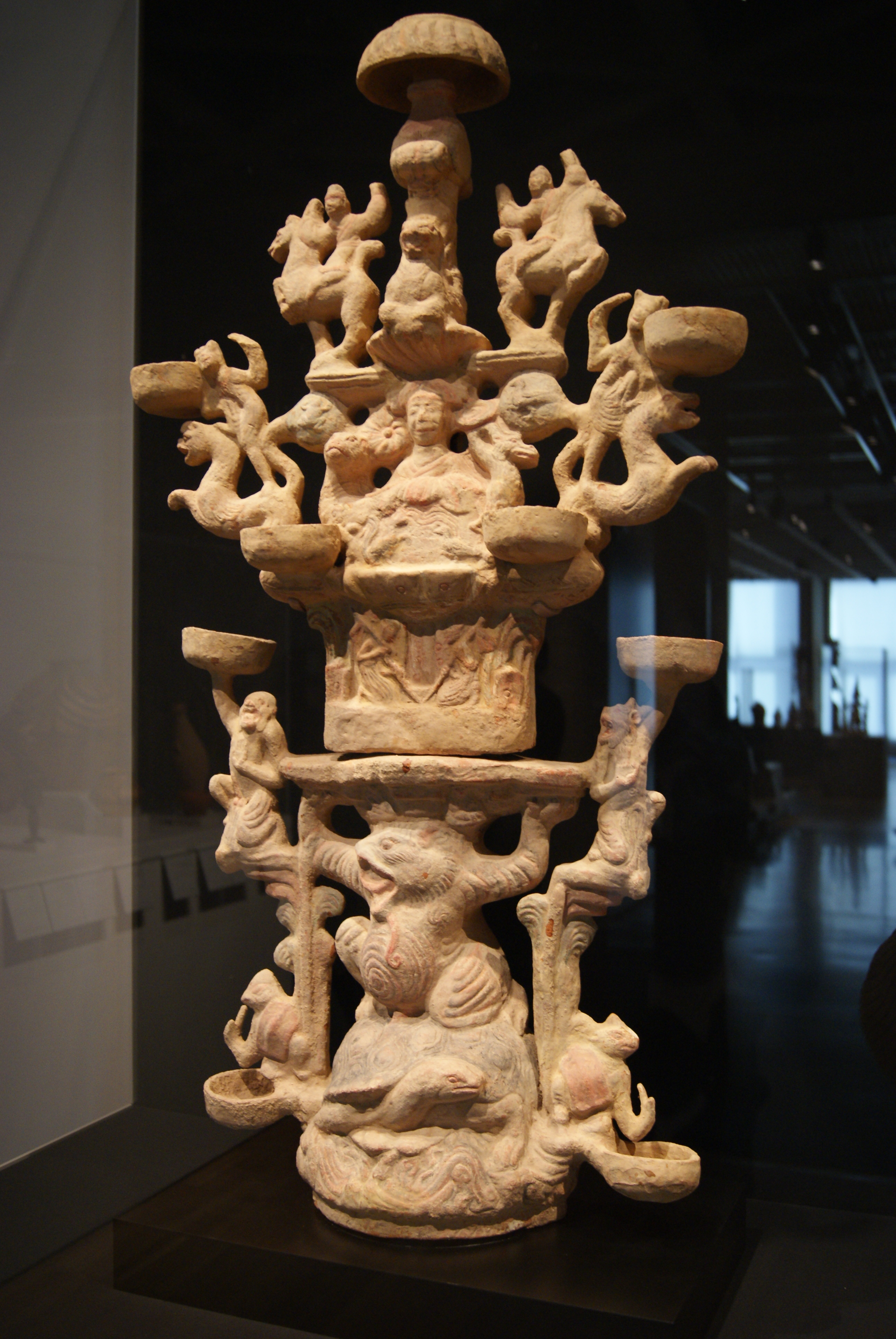
Oil lamp depicting the Queen of the West in her Heavenly Paradise together with relevant mythological geography and beings. Eastern Han ceramic unearthed at Chengdu, China.

The Moving Sands, also known as the Flowing Sands (Liúshā (流沙), "flowing-sand", or "quicksand"), is an important feature in the mythological geography of Chinese literature, including novels and poetry over a course of over two millennia from the Warring States to early Han dynasty era poetry of the Chuci onward to the present. In his poem "Li Sao", author Qu Yuan describes an aerial crossing of the Moving (or Flowing) Sands on a shamanic spiritual Journey to Kunlun. "Moving Sands forms one of the obstacles the fictional version of the monk Xuanzang and companions must cross over on their mission to fetch the Buddhist scriptures from India and return them to Tang China. In this story, Xuanzang recruits the former sand demon and eater-of-humans Sha Wujing who is living in Moving Sands as his third disciple. Sometimes the Moving (or Flowing) Sands seem to depict drifting dunes or desert, sometimes a sand or quicksand-like river, in which case, in Chinese, it would be (Liúshā-hé (流沙河, "flowing-sand river", or "quicksand-river").

== Mythological geographic context ==
Chinese mythology and imagination developed an extensive collection of ideas, about mythological places and terrains, Moving Sands included. David Hawkes Says "Chu poets give this name to an unlocatable area in the mythical geography of the west, but no doubt it derives ultimately from travelers' tales of the Takla Makan desert".

=== Nearby features ===
Various mythological geography is associated with the Moving Sands, including the Weak River, the Red River, and one or more of the eight mountain pillars, especially the (mythological) Kunlun Mountain and Jade Mountain.

=== Literature and poetry ===
The Moving Sands feature in literature, both in poetry and novels.

==== Literature ====
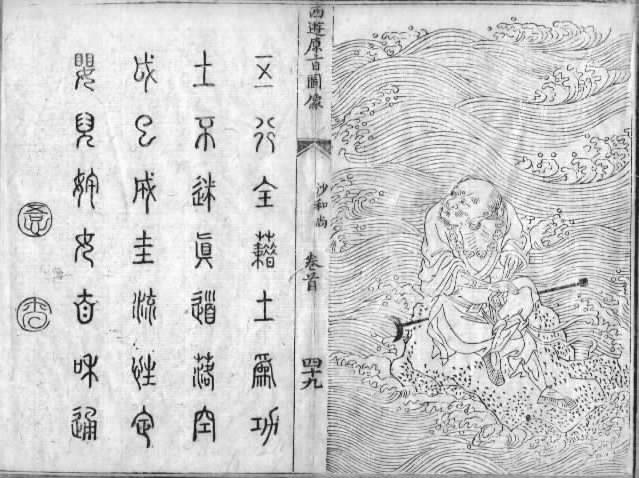
The heroic monk Sha Wujing, as pictured in the Journey to the West

In the novel Journey to the West the Moving Sand river forms one of the barriers on the way, one of the many difficult areas which the Xuanzang the Monk, Sun Wukong the Monkey, and their companion must cross over. By the mercy and help of the Buddhist goddess Guanyin, who by forethought and prior preparation made it happen, Xuanzang met his third disciple at the Moving (or Flowing) Sands, who joins them after a brief misunderstanding.

==== Poetry ====
The Moving Sands are referred to allusionly in various Chinese Classical poems, including the Chuci anthology included. In lines 349-350 of his poem "Li Sao", Qu Yuan describes crossing over through the sky by means of a team of dragons: he soars above all obstacle rivers and hostile terrain at will during his spirit journey. The Li Sao helped set the tone for other poems of the Chuci, which also allude to this type of mythological geography.

== Real moving sands ==
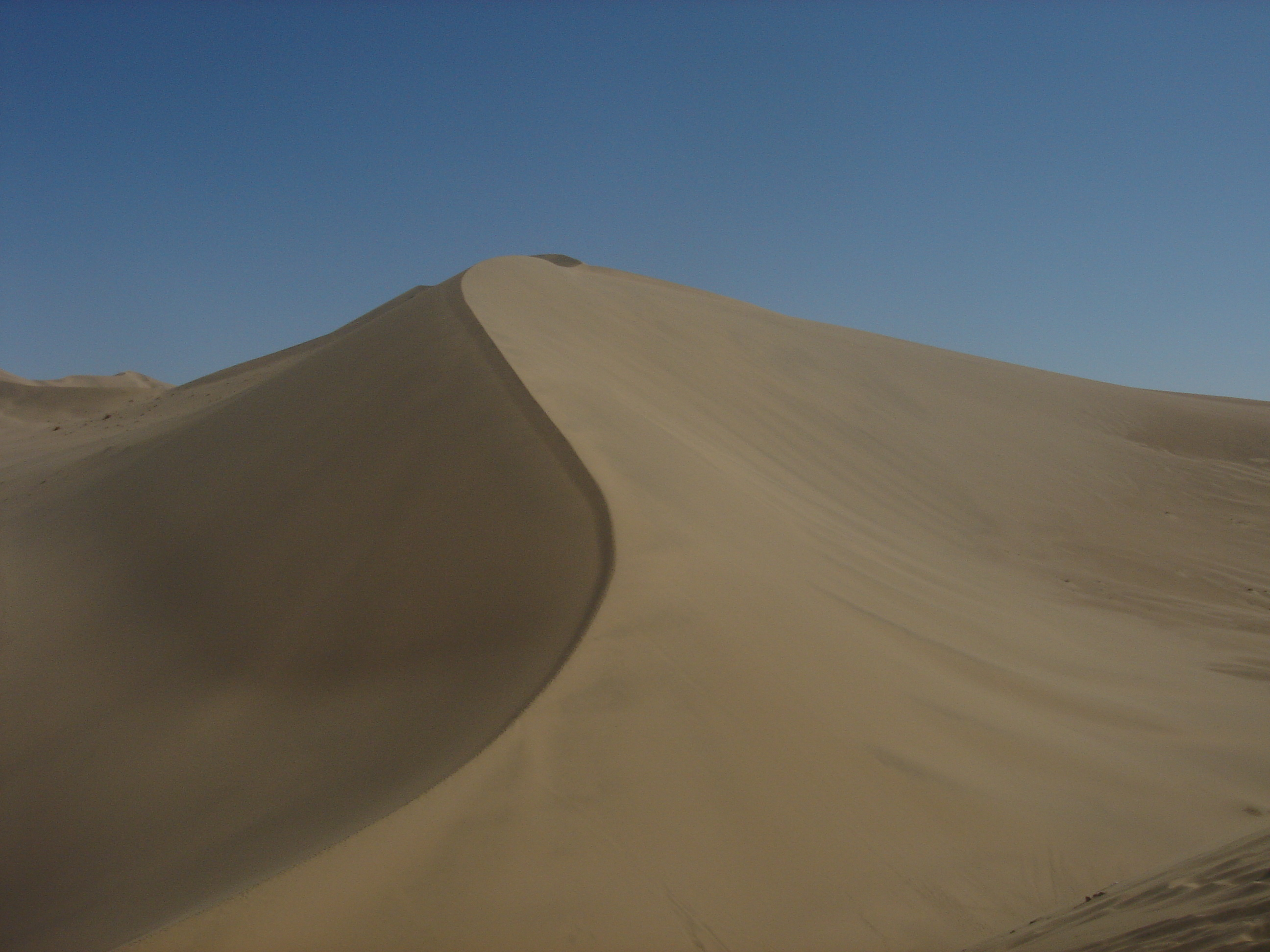
Singing sand dunes near Dunhuang, China, an example of shifting sands due to wind and gravity.

Real moving sands occur in and around China, in the form of desert dunes, moved by wind and gravity. The Taklamakan Desert is one example. Quicksand is another phenomenon encountered in and around China

== See also ==
- Chinese mythology: a general article on Chinese mythology
- Classical Chinese poetry: a general article on Classical Chinese poetry
- Dune, about sand dunes (moving sands)
- Jade Mountain (mythology): another mythical mountain
- Kunlun (mythology): nearby location in the mythological geography of China
- List of mythological Chinese rivers
- Red River (mythology): nearby location in the mythological geography of China.

== References cited ==
- Hawkes, David, translation, introduction, and notes (2011 [1985]). Qu Yuan et al., The Songs of the South: An Ancient Chinese Anthology of Poems by Qu Yuan and Other Poets. London: Penguin Books. ISBN 978-0-14-044375-2
- Yang, Lihui, et al. (2005). Handbook of Chinese Mythology. New York: Oxford University Press. ISBN 978-0-19-533263-6

== References consulted ==
- Yu, Anthony C., editor, translator, and introduction (1980 [1977]). The Journey to the West. Chicago and London: The University of Chicago Press. ISBN 978-0-226-97150-6
