= Jade Mountain (mythology) =

Fictional mountain in Chinese mythology

Jade Mountain (Chinese: 玉山; pinyin: Yùshān) is a mythological mountain in Chinese mythology and the residence of The Queen Mother of the West.

== Place ==
Jade Mountain should not be confused with any geographic places named Yushan. Also note, Jade Mountain and Feather Mountain (Chinese: 羽山; pinyin: Yǔshān) are both important places in Chinese mythology, but the Chinese word yu in both cases has a different character.

It has been suggested that the mountain corresponds to a location in the Kunlun Mountains and that "jade mountain" is a common Chinese name to describe a snow-capped peak.

== Background ==
Jade Mountain is mentioned in Chapter 2 of the Han dynasty text Classic of Mountains and Seas as being the residence of the Queen Mother of the West. It is thought that Jade Mountain, along with the Queen Mother of the West, date back to much earlier; the 4th century BCE Zhuangzi also describes her residence as being on a mountain.

== See also ==
- Kunlun Mountain: a mythical mountain, dwelling of various divinities, and fabulous plants and animals
- Mount Buzhou: mythical mountain
- Mount Penglai: paradise; a fabled fairy isle on the China Sea
- Moving Sands
