= Kunlun (mythology) =

Mountain in Chinese mythology

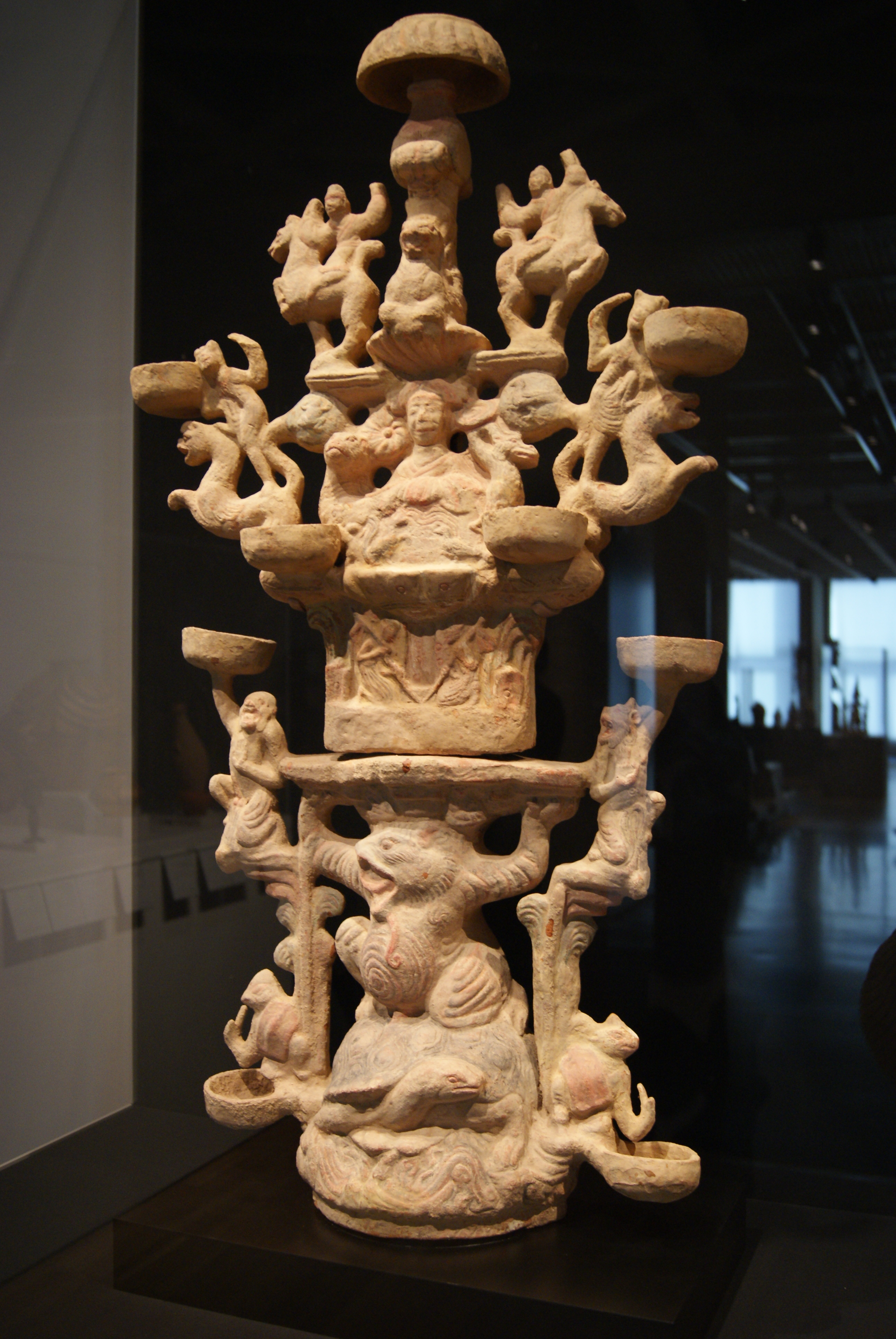
1st–2nd century lamp in the shape of Kunlun Mountain as the pillar of the sky, realm of the Queen Mother of the West (1st–2nd century CE).

The Kunlun (traditional Chinese: 崑崙; simplified Chinese: 昆仑; pinyin: Kūnlún; Wade–Giles: K'un-lun) or Kunlun Shan is a mountain or mountain range in Chinese mythology, an important symbol representing the axis mundi and divinity.

The mythological Kunlun is based on various mythologic and geographic sources from the Himalayan countries of India, China, Nepal, Bhutan, Pakistan and Afghanistan, including the Kunlun Mountains of the Tibetan Plateau and Mount Kailash (as an archetypal omphalos). The term "Kunlun" has also been applied to Southeastern, South and West Asian lands or islands and seemingly even Europe —although the relationship to the mountain is not clear beyond the nomenclature. Kunlun Mountains are also possible derivation and related to Mount Sumeru (myth), which is also directly referenced to Himalayas.

In any case, in Asian Mythology and folklore-combined, Kunlun refers to distant, exotic, and mysterious places. Different locations of Kunlun have been ascribed in the various legends, myths, and semi-historical accounts in which it appears. These accounts typically describe Kunlun as the dwelling place of various gods and goddesses where fabled plants and mythical creatures may also be found. Many important events in Asian mythology were based around Kunlun and Sumeru.

== Historical development ==
As the mythology related to the Kunlun developed, it became influenced by the later introduction of ideas about an axis mundi from the cosmology of India. The Kunlun became identified with (or took on the attributes of) Mount Sumeru.

Another historical development in the mythology of Kunlun (again with Indian influence) was that—rather than just being the source of the Yellow River—Kunlun began to be considered the source of four major rivers, flowing to the four quarters of the compass.

The Kunlun mythos was also influenced by developments within the Taoist tradition, and Kunlun came to be perceived as more of a paradise than a dangerous wilderness.

Some recent research proposed that, over time, the merging of various traditions has resulted in a duality of paradises—i.e., an East Paradise, identified with Mount Penglai, and a West Paradise, identified with Kunlun Mountain. A pole replaced a former mythic system that opposed Penglai with Guixu ("Returning Mountain"), and the Guixu mythological material was transferred to the Kunlun mythos.

== Name ==
The Chinese name "Kunlun" 崑崙 (or 崐崘) is written with characters combining the "mountain radical" 山 with phonetics of kun 昆 and lun 侖. Alternate names for Kunlun shan include Kunling 崑陵 (with "hill") and Kunqiu 崑丘 (with "mound").

The term "Kunlun" may be semantically related to two other terms: Hundun (Chinese: 混沌; pinyin: hùndùn; Wade–Giles: hun-tun; lit. 'primal chaos" or "muddled confusion'), which is sometimes personified as a living creature; and kongdong (Chinese: 空洞; pinyin: kōngdòng; Wade–Giles: k'ung-tung; lit. 'grotto of vacuity'), according to Kristofer Schipper. Grotto-heavens were traditionally associated with mountains, as hollows or caves located in/on certain mountains. The term "Kunlun Mountain" can be translated as "Cavernous Mountain", and the mythological Kunlun Mountain has been viewed as a hollow mountain (located directly under the pole star).

The term "Kunlun", however, had also been used in old texts to refer to people and places unrelated to the mythical mountain. It was, for example, used in reference to the southern people called Gurong, who were slaves in China. Edward H. Schafer quotes the Old Book of Tang description "The people south of Lin yi are curly haired and black bodied and was called kurung" and following quote by 9th century Buddhist scholar Hui Lin (慧琳), "They are also called Kurung. They are the barbarous men of the islands, great and small, of the Southern Seas. They are very black, and expose their naked Figures. They can tame and cow ferocious beasts, rhinoceroses, elephants, and the like." Schafer notes that—besides Kunlun—these southerners were occasionally referred to as Gulong 古龍 or Gulun 骨論.

Julie Wilensky notes that the term Kunlun is a "mysterious and poorly understood word, first applied to dark-skinned Chinese and then expanded over time to encompass multiple meanings, all connoting dark skin." But she further explains: "These uses of kunlun are unrelated to the name of the Kunlun Mountains." In a footnote, she adds: "Chang Hsing-Iang writes that the Kunlun mountain 'region has been familiar to the Chinese from the earliest times, and no Chinese work has ever described its inhabitants as being black-skinned.'" She then proceeds to explain how "Kunlun" was used to refer to places in Southeast Asia and Africa.

== Location ==
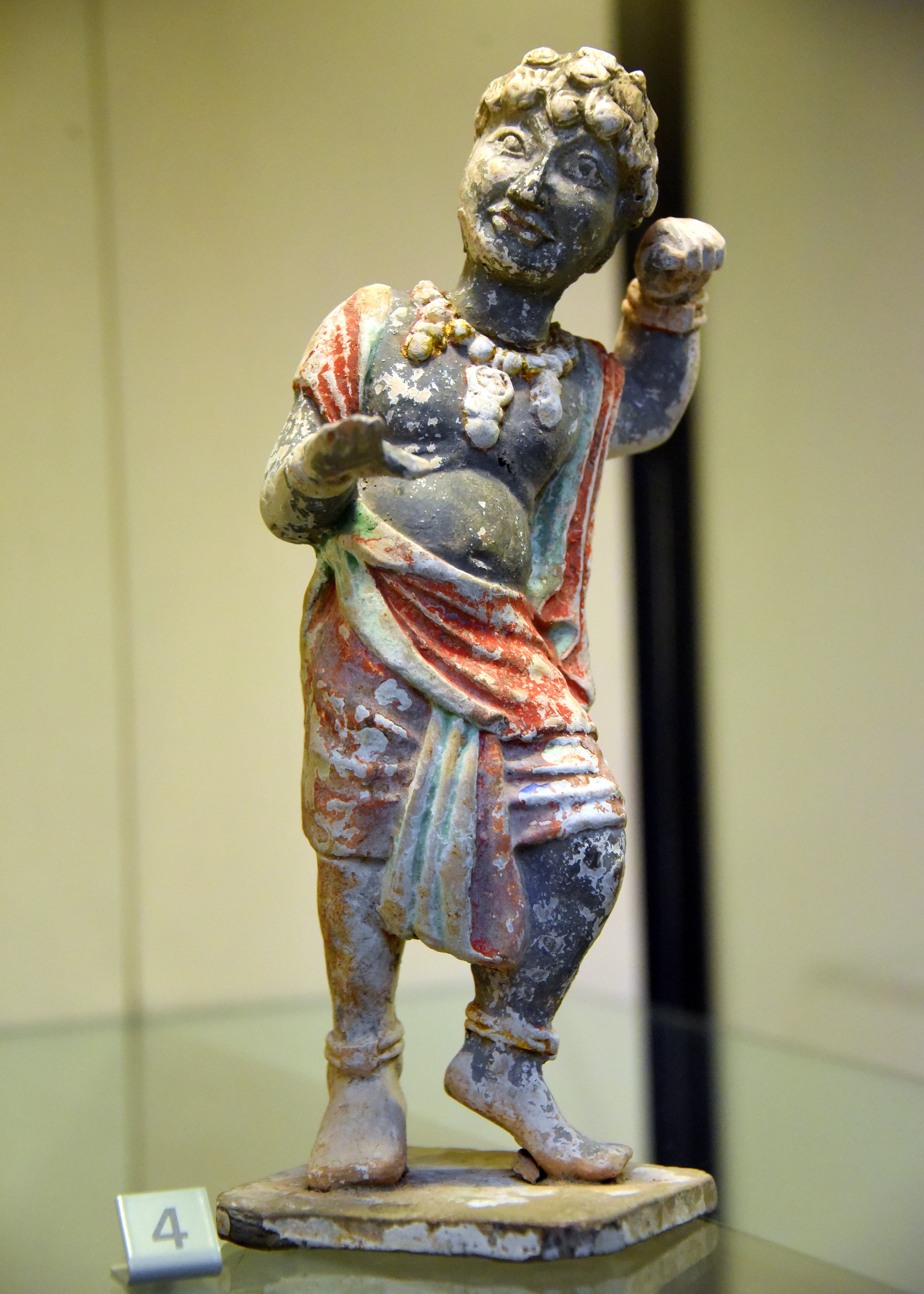
Dancing boy, representing one of the Kunlun boys. Painted earthenware with gilding. Tang Dynasty, 680–750 CE. From the Eumorfopoulos Collection. Victoria and Albert Museum, London

Various notions about the location of the mythical Kunlun Mountain have been proposed: chapter eleven of the Shanhaijing describes it as being in the northwest, chapter sixteen says it is south of the western sea, and other sources place it in the center of the Earth.

Some believed Kunlun to be located to the "far" west; in this case, the alleged location was relocated further and further to the west, along with advances in geographical knowledge. E. T. C. Werner identifies Kunlun with the Hindu Kush mountain range.

At times, the mythical Kunlun Mountain has been confused with the modern Kunlun Mountains and with Kurung (or Kurung Bnam), possibly translated as "Kings of the Mountain" from the Old Khmer (formerly known as Old Cambodian) and equivalent to the Sanskrit Śailarāja, also meaning "Kings of the Mountain", referring to a mythical holy cosmic mountain. Kurung (Kunlun) is known to have flourished during the time of the Tang dynasty, and seems to have developed ambassadorial relations with the Tang court by the time of Li He (790–816), who records a visit in one of his extent poems; although geographical specifics of the state of Kunlun's location(s) remain uncertain, it is associated with trans-Gangetic India, possibly the Malay Peninsula or areas controlled by the Sailendra thalassocracy.

== Description ==
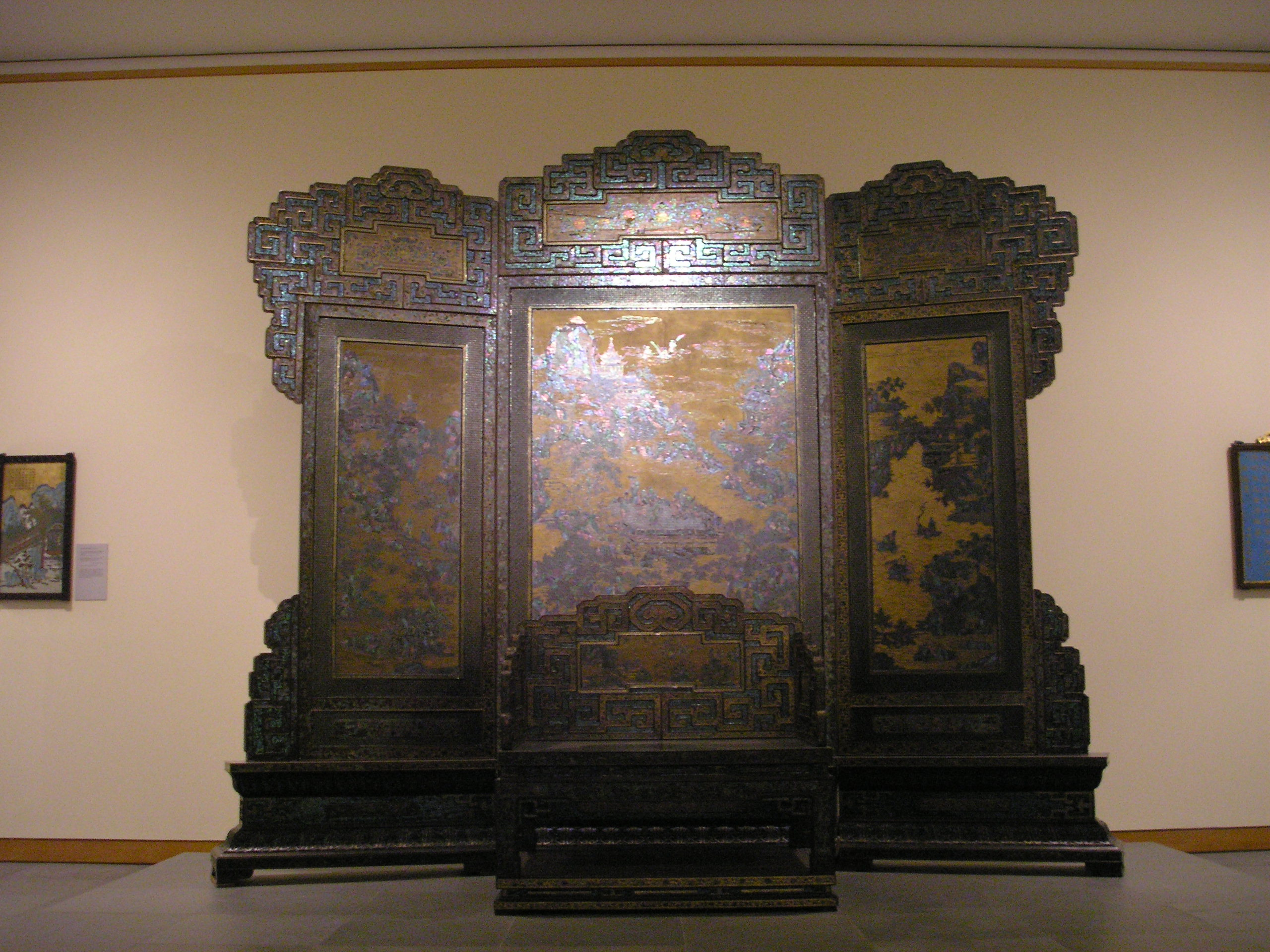
A throne and screen from the imperial workshops in the beginning of the era of the Kangxi Emperor (1662–1722). The screen depicts the Western Paradise — mythologically located on Kunlun Mountain — with scenes of mountains, valleys, seas, terraces, lakes, and palaces. Shown is the arrival of its ruler — the Queen Mother of the West (Xiwangmu), shown riding a phoenix — and the Eight Immortals awaiting her arrival.

Kunlun Mountain has been described in various texts, as well as being depicted in art. Sometimes Kunlun appears as a pillar of the sky (or earth)—sometimes appearing to be composed of multiple tiers, with the commonality of "mystery, grandeur, or magnificence" being emphasized in its mythological descriptions. The base of Kunlun Mountain is said to penetrate far into the earth, while its above-ground part proceeds into the sky.

In general, accounts emphasize the difficulty of access to the mountain and—even more strikingly—its hallowed places, due to its surrounding waters and steep cliffs of immense heights. Kunlun typically also has a strong association with various means to obtain immortality, or longevity. Poetic descriptions tend to lavish Kunlun with paradisaical detail: gem-like rocks and towering cliffs of jasper and jade, exotic jeweled plants, bizarrely formed and colored magical fungi, and numerous birds and other animals, together with humans who have become immortal beings. Sometimes, it is the Eight Immortals who are seen, coming to pay their respects to the goddess Xiwangmu, perhaps invited to join her in a feast of immortal repast. This is the well-worn image or motif that is frequently painted, carved, or otherwise depicted in the material arts.

=== Association with divinity ===
==== Supreme Deity ====
Kunlun is believed to be the representation of the Supreme Deity (Taidi). According to some sources, his throne is at the top tier of the mountain, known as the "Palace of Heaven". As Kunlun was sometimes viewed as the pillar holding up the sky and keeping it separated from the terrestrial plane, some accounts place the top of Kunlun in Heaven rather than locating it on Earth; in this case, the Supreme Deity's abode on Kunlun is actually in Heaven, and Kunlun functions as a sort of ladder that could be used to travel between Earth and Heaven. Accordingly, any person who succeeded in climbing up to the top of Kunlun would magically become an immortal spirit.

==== Xiwangmu ====
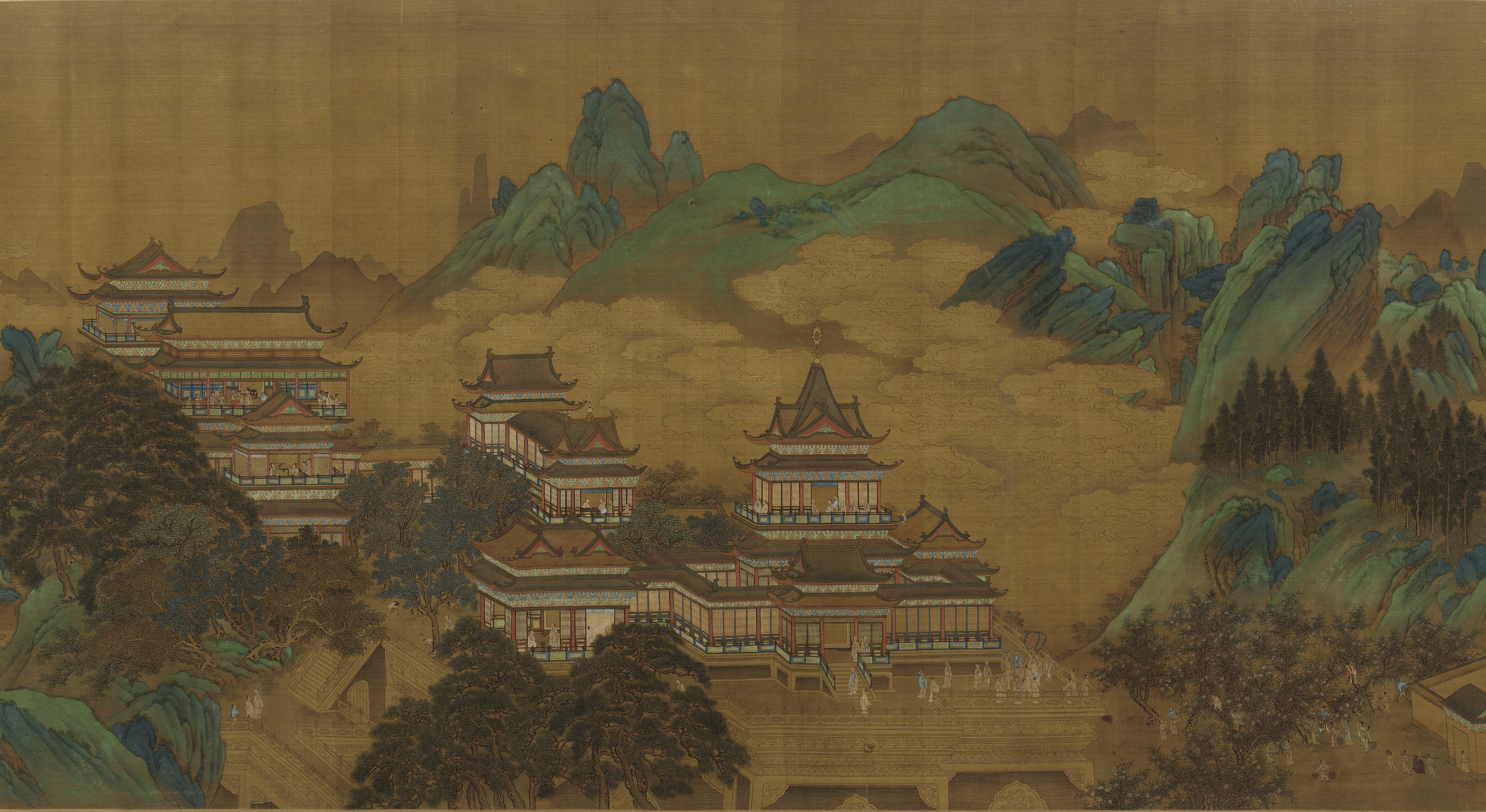
Peach Festival of the Queen Mother of the West, a Chinese Ming Dynasty painting from the early 17th century, by an anonymous artist. A mythological event traditionally occurring on the mythological Kunlun Mountain. From the Freer and Sackler Galleries of Washington D.C.

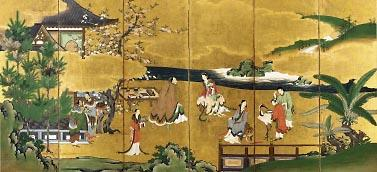
A Japanese painting depicting Emperor Wu of the Han Dynasty meeting Xiwangmu, according to a fictional account of his magical transportation to Kunlun Mountain.

Although not originally located on Kunlun, but rather on Jade Mountain neighboring to the north (and west of the Moving Sands), Xiwangmu—the Queen Mother of Meng Hao in the West—in later accounts was relocated to a palace protected by golden ramparts, within which immortals (xian) feasted on bear paws, monkey lips, and the livers of dragons, served at the edge of the Lake of Gems. Every 6,000 years, the peaches that conferred immortality upon those who ate them would be served (except during the time when they were purloined by Monkey King). Originally a plague deity with tiger teeth and leopard tail, Xiwangmu became a beautiful and well-mannered goddess, responsible for guarding the herb of immortality.

==== Yu Shi ====
Yu Shi—a Chinese spirit or god of rain, also known as the "Lord of Rain" or "Leader of Rain"—is thought to have his dwelling place upon the Kunlun slopes. During the reign of Shennong, a certain Chisongzi (Master Red Pine) performed a rain-making ceremony that successfully ended a terrible drought, leading to his promotion to "Yu Shi", "Master of Rain".

==== Shamans ====
According to the Shanhaijing, the top of Kunlun is the habitation of shamans; Wu Peng is depicted holding the herb of immortality there, in the company of five other shamans called Siva Harish.

==== Xian ====
In later tradition, Kunlun was pictured as a Daoist paradise, inhabited by xian, or Daoist immortals (i.e., humans who had metamorphosed into superhuman form), which was presided over by Xiwangmu. The xian were often seen as temporary residents, who visited by means of flying on the back of a magical crane or dragon.

=== Creatures ===
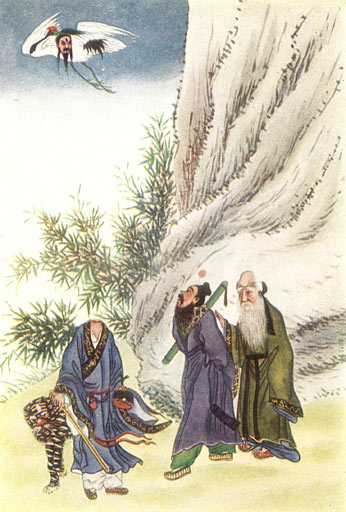
Chiang Tzŭ-ya at K’un-lun

Kunlun has a lively bestiary, with various types of more-or-less fantastic beasts and birds present in its environs. Often the tiger or beings with tiger-like features are associated with Kunlun, since the tiger is symbolic of the west, and Kunlun is often associated with the Western Paradise. Creatures symbolic of immortality are often seen or described in depictions of Kunlun, such as deer or cranes. Xiwangmu is often identified as having a spotted deer as a pet. Besides the cranes (traditionally thought of as the mounts or the transformations of immortals), other birds come and go from the mountain, flying errands for Xiwangmu; these blue (or green) birds are her qingniao. Sometimes the poets claim to have received joyful inspiration during a visit by one of these birds, carrying a message from Xiwangmu.

=== Plants ===
The flora of Kunlun and its environs are in keeping with the rest of its natural (and supernatural) qualities, including the Pearl and Jade Trees, the Tree of Immortality, and Tree Grain (i.e., Muhe, which was forty feet in height and five spans in thickness). Peaches are (and have been) often associated with Xiwangmu. The langgan was a tree of fairy gems in colours of blue or green, which was reported to grow on Kunlun in the classic books of the Zhou and early Han dynasties.

=== Palaces and Gardens ===
Kunlun is described as having various structures, areas, or significant features either on or around the area of the mountain. The palace of Xiwangmu, sometimes described as having golden ramparts, was located on Kunlun; those blessed to gather there might partake of the fruit of longevity. Often, her palace is described as having a park or garden, bordering a Jasper Pool. Of gardens, a (the) Hanging Garden was referenced early on.

=== Rivers and Sands ===
Four rivers were sometimes said to flow out of Kunlun Mountain: the Red River (Chishui, 赤水), the Yellow River, the Black River (黑水, black water), and the Yang River(洋水) (Yang 2005: 161). A fifth river was said to flow around the base of Kunlun, which rose in a way that was particularly steep and hard to climb. This Weak River at the base of Kunlun flowed with a liquid so lacking in density that not even a feather could float upon it. This was a major obstacle, since it could neither be swum or floated over on a vessel (Yang 2005: 162, 219). However, this was an obstacle routinely overcome by those practiced in the way of magic (Daoist or shamanic). Two examples of those who overcame these hindrances were Sun Wukong (Journey to the West) and Qu Yuan in his poem ("Li Sao")—both already on the path to immortality, one as a god and the other as a poet. Another barrier to Kunlun was the dangerous and difficult-to-cross Moving Sands, also known as Flowing Sands or Liusha. According to Shanhaijing (Chapter 16), Kunlun was located south of the West Sea, behind the Red River, and on the shore of Liusha (Yang 2005: 162, 219).

== Events ==
Kunlun Mountain is a major scene of action in various myths, as well as literary works derived from the myths, legends, or religious descriptions or depictions.

=== Marriage of Nüwa and Fuxi ===
Fuxi and Nuwa's marriage took place on the mountain of Kunlun. Generally held to be brother and sister, and the last surviving human beings after a catastrophic flood, the incest taboo was waived by an explicit sign after prayerful questioning of a divine being, who approved their marriage and thus the repopulation of the world.

=== King Mu, Son of Heaven ===
Mu, son of Heaven, visited the mountain to dine with Queen Mother of the West—carried along on his trip by eight extraordinary mounts, depicted in art as "weird and unworldly".

== Cultural references ==
Many important literary references and allusions to Kunlun Mountain are found in traditional works—including famous novels, poems, and theatrical pieces. It also appears in popular modern fiction.

=== Novels ===
Among other literature, Kunlun Mountain appears in Fengshen Yanyi, Legend of the White Snake, the Tale of King Mu, Son of Heaven, Kunlun Nu, Zhen Hun (镇魂, also known as Guardian), and Journey to the West (also known as Monkey).

=== Theater ===
The Kunlun Slave (slave from Kunlun) was a stock character in Chinese theater, also known in Japanese theater as "Konron". He was portrayed as exotic in appearance, possessing superhuman powers. The Ming dynasty dramatist and playwright Mei Dingzuo (1549–1615) wrote a play "How the Kunlun Slave Became an Immortal".

=== Poetry ===
Kunlun Mountain is a subject alluded to in the ancient poems "Li Sao" and "Heavenly Questions" by Qu Yuan, frequently mentioned in medieval Tang dynasty poetry, and referenced during the twentieth century in Mao Zedong's 1935 poem "Kunlun".

=== Modern popular culture ===
Kunlun is used in the manga 3×3 Eyes. The term — written as K'un-L'un — also appears in the Marvel Comics universe, primarily in stories featuring Iron Fist. It is depicted as one of the seven Capital Cities of Heaven and only appears on Earth periodically. In Alan Moore's The League of Extraordinary Gentlemen: Black Dossier (2007), K'un-Lun is identified with the Fire Mountain from H. Rider Haggard's Ayesha. Kunlun is also featured in many Chinese dramas. The 2024 action platformer game Nine Sols takes place on an island named New Kunlun. It also appears in Ne Zha 2.

== See also ==
- Chi (mythology): has some discussion related to Kunlun beastiary
- Chinese mythology: a general article on Chinese mythology
- Four Mountains: advisors to emperors Yao and Shun, sometimes associated with four cardinal mountains
- Gigaku: article mentioning the character from Kunlun
- List of mythological Chinese mountains
- Neijing Tu: Daoist internal alchemy diagram relating human anatomy and cosmic theory
- Peaches of Immortality: magical fruit providing longevity
- Sungmo: Korean primordial goddess associated to a "western mountain"
- Shangri-La, a fictional Himalayan mountain paradise with many similarities to the mythical Kunlun
