= Li Sao =

Ancient Chinese narrative poem attributed to Qu Yuan

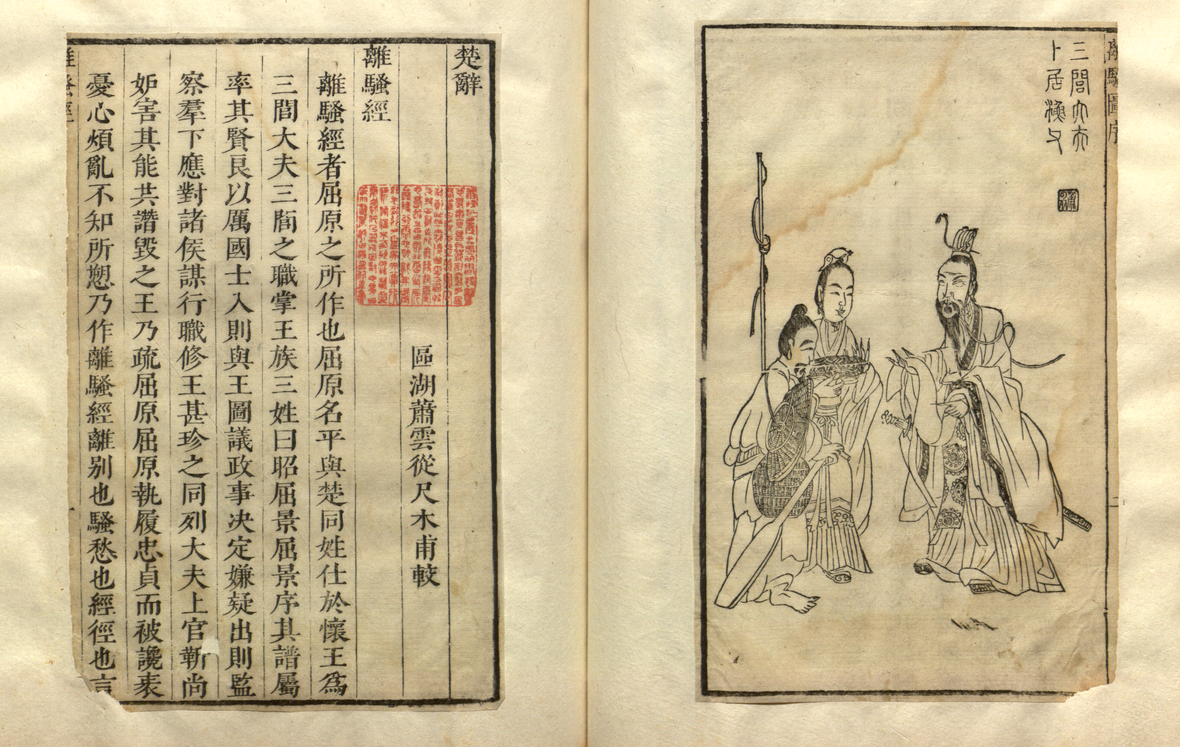
- Two pages from "Li Sao" from a 1645 illustrated copy of the Songs of Chu, showing the poem "The Lament", with its name being enhanced by the addition of the character 經 (jing), which is usually only so used in the case of referring to one of the Chinese classics.
- Author: (trad.) Qu Yuan
- Published: c. 3rd century BCE

Li Sao
- "Li Sao" in seal script (top), Traditional (middle), and Simplified (bottom) Chinese characters
- Traditional Chinese: 離騷
- Simplified Chinese: 离骚
- Literal meaning: "Encountering Sorrow"
Transcriptions
Standard Mandarin
- Hanyu Pinyin: Lí Sāo
- Wade–Giles: Li^{2} Sao^{1}
- IPA: [lǐ sáʊ]
Yue: Cantonese
- Yale Romanization: Lèih Sōu
- Jyutping: Lei^{4} Sou^{1}
- IPA: [lej˩ sɔw˥]
Southern Min
- Tâi-lô: Lī So
Middle Chinese
- Middle Chinese: Lje Saw
Old Chinese
- Baxter–Sagart (2014): *[r]aj [s]ˤu

"Li Sao" (Chinese: 離騷; pinyin: Lí Sāo; translation: "Encountering Sorrow") is an ancient Chinese poem from the anthology Chuci traditionally attributed to Qu Yuan. Li Sao dates from the 3rd century BCE, during the Chinese Warring States period.

== Background ==
The poem "Li Sao" is in the Chuci collection and is traditionally attributed to Qu Yuan (Note: Qu Yuan 屈原, alias Qu Ping 屈平.) of the Kingdom of Chu, who died about 278 BCE.

Qu Yuan manifests himself in a poetic character, in the tradition of Classical Chinese poetry, contrasting with the anonymous poetic voices encountered in the Shijing and the other early poems which exist as preserved in the form of incidental incorporations into various documents of ancient miscellany. The rest of the Chuci anthology is centered on the "Li Sao", the purported biography of its author Qu Yuan.

In "Li Sao", the poet despairs that he has been plotted against by evil factions at court with his resulting rejection by his lord and then recounts a series of shamanistic spirit journeys to various mythological realms, engaging or attempting to engage with a variety of divine or spiritual beings, with the theme of the righteous minister unfairly rejected sometimes becoming exaggerated in the long history of later literary criticism and allegorical interpretation. It dates from the time of King Huai of Chu, in the third century BCE.

== Meaning of title ==
The meaning of the title "Li Sao" is not straightforward. In the biography of Qu Yuan, li sao is explained as being as equivalent to li you 離憂 "leaving with sorrow" (Sima Qian, Shiji or the Records of the Grand Historian). Inference must be made that 'meeting with sorrow' must have been meant. However, the 1st century CE scholar Ban Gu explicitly glossed the title as "encountering sorrow". Modern theories posit that, at some point, scribes mistook yóu ⿱又虫 𧈡 {尤} for zǎo 蚤, having a cha 叉 component instead of you 又, which led to the current name. Therefore, the name could be li you 罹尤 or 離尤 "to encounter a fault."

== Content ==
The Li Sao begins with the poet's introduction of himself, his ancestry, and his former shamanic glory.

Of the god-king Gao-yang I am the far offspring,
My late honored sire bore the name of Bo-yong.
The she-ti stars aimed to the year's first month;
Geng-yin was the day that I came down.

He scanned and delved into my first measure,
From the portents my sire gave these noble names:
The name that he gave me was Upright Standard;
And my title of honor was Godly Poise.

Such bounty I had of beauty within,
And to this was added fair countenance.
I wore mantles of river rush and remote angelica,
Strung autumn orchids to hang from my sash.

— Li Sao, stanzas 1 to 3 (Stephen Owen, trans.)
Translation:

帝高陽之苗裔兮，
朕皇考曰伯庸。
攝提貞于孟陬兮，
惟庚寅吾以降。

皇覽揆余初度兮，
肇錫余以嘉名。
名余曰正則兮，
字余曰靈均。

紛吾既有此內美兮，
又重之以脩能。
扈江離與辟芷兮，
紐秋蘭以為佩。

He references his current situation, and then recounts his fantastical physical and spiritual trip across the landscapes of ancient China, real and mythological. "Li Sao" is a seminal work in the large Chinese tradition of landscape and travel literature.

I knelt with robes open, thus stated my case,
Having grasped so clearly what is central and right.
I teamed jade white dragons, rode the Bird that Hides Sky,
Waiting on winds to fleetly fare upward.

At dawn I loosed wheel-block there by Cang-wu,
And by twilight I reached the Gardens of Air.
I wished to bide a while by the windows of gods,
But swift was the sun and it soon would be dusk.

I bade sun-driver Xi-he, to pause in her pace,
To stand off from Yan-zi and not to draw night.
On and on stretched my road, long it was and far,
I would go high and go low in this search that I made.

I watered my horses in the Pools of Xian,
And twisted the reins on the tree Fu-sang,
I snapped a branch of the Ruo Tree to block out the sun,
I roamed freely the while and lingered there.

— Li Sao, stanzas 46–49 (Owen, trans.)
Translation:

跪敷衽以陳辭兮，
耿吾既得此中正。
駟玉虯以乘鷖兮，
溘埃風余上徵。

朝發軔於蒼梧兮，
夕余至乎縣圃。
欲少留此靈瑣兮，
日忽忽其將暮。

吾令羲和弭節兮，
望崦嵫而勿迫。
路曼曼其脩遠兮，
吾將上下而求索。

飲余馬於咸池兮，
總余轡乎扶桑。
折若木以拂日兮，
聊逍遙以相羊。

"Li Sao" is also a political allegory in which the poet laments that his own righteousness, purity, and honor are unappreciated and go unused in a corrupt world. The poet alludes to being slandered by enemies and being rejected by the king he served (King Huai of Chu).

Those men of faction had ill-gotten pleasures,
Their paths went in shadow, narrow, unsafe.
Not for myself came this dread of doom—
I feared my king's chariot soon would be tipped.

In haste I went dashing in front and behind,
Till I came to the tracks of our kings before.
Lord Iris did not fathom my nature within,
He believed ill words, he glowered in rage.

I knew well my bluntness had brought me these woes,
Yet I bore through them, I could not forswear.
I pointed to Heaven to serve as my warrant,
It was all for the cause of the Holy One.

— Li Sao, stanzas 9 to 11 (Owen, trans.)
Translation:

惟黨人之偷樂兮，
路幽昧以險隘。
豈余身之憚殃兮，
恐皇輿之敗績。

忽奔走以先後兮，
及前王之踵武。
荃不察余之忠情兮，
反信讒而齌怒。

余固知謇謇之為患兮，
忍而不能舍也。
指九天以為正兮，
夫唯靈脩之故也。

As a representative work of Chu poetry it makes use of a wide range of metaphors derived from the culture of Chu, which was strongly associated with a Chinese form of shamanism, and the poet spends much of "Li Sao" on a spirit journey visiting with spirits and deities. The poem's main themes include Qu Yuan's falling victim to intrigues in the court of Chu, and subsequent exile; his desire to remain pure and untainted by the corruption that was rife in the court; and also his lamentation at the gradual decline of the once-powerful state of Chu.

The poet decides to leave and join Peng Xian (Chinese: 彭咸), a figure that many believe to be the God of Sun. Wang Yi, the Han dynasty commentator to the Chuci, believed Peng Xian to have been a Shang dynasty official who, legend says, drowned himself after his wise advice was rejected by the king (but this legend may have been of later make, influenced by the circumstances of Qu Yuan drowning himself). Some scholars believe the name refers to two separate people named Peng and Xian. Peng Xian may also have been an ancient shaman who later came to symbolize hermit seclusion.

It is now done forever!
In all the kingdom there is no man, no man who knows me,
Then why should I care for that city, my home?
Since no one will join me in making good rule,
I will go off to seek where Peng and Xian dwell.

— Li Sao, ending song (Owen, trans.)
Translation:

已矣哉，
國無人莫我知兮，
又何懷乎故都？
既莫足與為美政兮，
吾將從彭咸之所居。

The poem has a total of 373 lines and close to 2500 characters, which makes it one of the longest poems dating from Ancient China. It is in the fu style. The precise date of composition is unknown, it would seem to have been written by Qu Yuan after his exile by King Huai; however, it seems to have been before Huai's captivity in the state of Qin began, in 299 BCE.

== Reissue ==
The poem was reissued in the 19th century by Pan Zuyin (1830–90), a linguist who was a member of the Qing Dynasty staff. It was reissued as four volumes with two prefaces, with one by Xiao Yuncong.

== Translations into Western languages ==
English

- E.H. Parker (1878–1879). "The Sadness of Separation or Li Sao". China Review 7: 309–14.
- James Legge (1895). The Chinese Classics (Oxford: Clarendon Press): 839–64.
- Lim Boon Keng (1935). The Li Sao: An Elegy on Encountering Sorrows by Ch'ü Yüan (Shanghai: Commercial Press): 62–98.
- David Hawkes (1959). Ch'u Tz'u: Songs of the South, an Ancient Chinese Anthology (Oxford: Clarendon Press): 21–34.
- Stephen Owen (1996). An Anthology of Chinese Literature: Beginnings to 1911 (New York: W.W. Norton): 162–75.
- Red Pine (2021). A Shaman's Lament (Empty Bowl).

French

- Marie-Jean-Léon, Marquis d'Hervey de Saint Denys (1870). Le Li sao, poéme du III^{e} siècle avant notre ére, traduit du chinois (Paris: Maisonneuve).
- J.-F. Rollin (1990). Li Sao, précédé de Jiu Ge et suivie de Tian Wen de Qu Yuan (Paris: Orphée/La Différence), 58–91.

Italian

- G.M. Allegra (1938). Incontro al dolore di Kiu Yuan (Shanghai: ABC Press).

== See also ==
- Chu Ci
- Kunlun Mountain (mythology)
- List of Chu Ci contents
- Liu An
- Liu Xiang (scholar)
- Qu Yuan
- Wang Yi (librarian)
- Wu (shaman)
- Xiao Yuncong
