= List of flood myths =

List of floods in mythology

Flood myths are common across a wide range of cultures, extending back into Bronze Age and Neolithic prehistory. These accounts depict a flood, sometimes global in scale, usually sent by a deity or deities to destroy civilization as an act of divine retribution.

== Africa ==
Although the continent has relatively few flood legends, African cultures preserving an oral tradition of a flood include the Khoisan, Kwaya, Mbuti, Maasai, Mandin, and Yoruba peoples.

Egypt

Floods were seen as beneficial in Ancient Egypt, and as such the culture did not have myths of destructive floods. However, one flood myth in Egyptian mythology involves the god Ra transforms his daughter Hathor into Sekhmet and sends her to destroy part of humanity for their disrespect and unfaithfulness. The story goes that she became overenthusiastic in her bloodlust so Ra instructed the people to pour out wine and beer dyed with red ochre. Thinking it was more blood, Sekhmet drank it causing her to pass out and her slaughter ceased. This was commemorated in a wine drinking festival during the annual Nile flood.

== Americas ==
=== North America ===
- Algonquian peoples (some): Manabozho Stories
- Anishinaabe: Flood Myth - an Algonquin Story
- Anishinaabe: Turtle Island
- Choctaw: A Choctaw Flood Story
- Comox people: Legend of Queneesh
- Cree: Cree Flood Story
- Cree (Knisteneaux): Knisteneaux Flood Myth
- Hopi mythology: Entrance into the Fourth World
- Inuit: flood myth
- Menomini: Manabozho and the Flood
- Miꞌkmaq: Two Creators and their Conflicts
- Nipmuc: Cautanowwit
- Nisqually: In the beginning of the Nisqually world.
- Ojibwe: Great Serpent and the Great Flood
- Ojibwe: Manabozho and the Muskrat
- Ojibwe: Waynaboozhoo and the Great Flood
- Orowignarak (Alaska): "A great inundation, together with an earthquake, swept the land so rapidly that only a few people escaped in their skin canoes to the tops of the highest mountains."
- Ottawa: The Great Flood
- Saanich (W̱SÁNEĆ): the W̱SÁNEĆ endonym means "the emerging people" in the Saanich dialect because they survived a great flood and settled atop the mountain that emerged as the water receded.

=== Mesoamerica ===
==== Aztec/Mexica ====
- Coxcox

==== Maya ====
- Popol Vuh: Huracan caused the fall of the wooden people by way of a great flood.

=== South America ===
- Jipohan flood legend
- Kaingang flood legend

==== Canari ====
- Urcocari

==== Inca ====
- Unu Pachakuti

==== Mapuche ====
- Legend of Trentren Vilu and Caicai Vilu

==== Muisca ====
- Bochica

==== Tupi ====
- Sumé

== Asia ==
=== Ancient West Asia ===
==== Mesopotamia ====
- Eridu Genesis
- Atra-Hasis
- Gilgamesh flood myth

==== Abrahamic religions ====
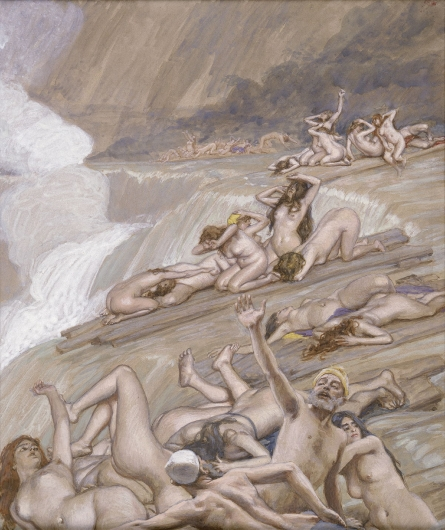
The Deluge, c. 1896–1902, by James Jacques Joseph Tissot

- Genesis flood narrative (retold in Gnostic texts such as the Secret Book of John and Hypostasis of the Archons)
  - Noah's Ark
  - Islamic view of Noah

=== China ===
- Yu the Great
- Nüwa
- Great Flood (China)
- Li Bing and Li Erlang: Li Bing designed a dam to control the floods in Sichuan that still stands today. Li Erlang and his sworn brother defeat the river dragon who'd caused the flood.
- Sinking city myth
- Great flood and procreation

=== Iran ===
- The Videvdad mentions that Ahura Mazda warns Yima that there will come a harsh winter storm followed by melted snow. Ahura Mazda advises Yima to construct a Vara (Avestan: enclosure). This he is to populate with the fittest of men and women; and with two of every animal, bird and plant; and supply with food and water gathered the previous summer. Norbert Oettinger argues that the story of Yima and the Vara was originally a flood myth, and the harsh winter was added in due to the dry nature of Eastern Iran, as floods didn't have as much of an effect as harsh winters. He has argued that the Videvdad 2.24's mention of melted water flowing is a remnant of the flood myth.

=== India ===
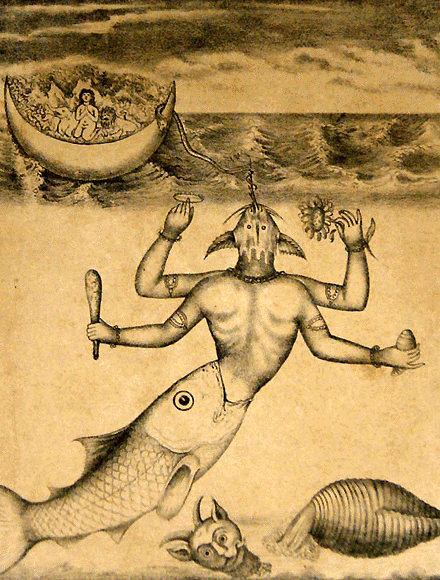
The Matsya avatar comes to the rescue of Manu

- Manu and Matsya: The legend first appears in Shatapatha Brahmana (700–300 BCE), and is further detailed in Matsya Purana (250–500 CE). Matsya (the incarnation of Lord Vishnu as a fish) forewarns Manu (a human) about an impending catastrophic flood and orders him to collect all the grains of the world in a boat; in some forms of the story, all living creatures are also to be preserved in the boat. When the flood destroys the world, Manu – in some versions accompanied by the seven great sages – survives by boarding the ark, which Matsya pulls to safety. Norbert Oettinger argues that the story originally was about Yama, but that he was replaced by his brother Manu due to the social context of the authorship of the Shatapatha Brahmana.
- Pūluga, the creator god in the religion of the indigenous inhabitants of the Andaman Islands, sends a devastating flood to punish people who have forgotten his commands. Only four people survive this flood: two men and two women.

=== Indonesia ===
- Watuwe the Mystic Crocodile

=== Japan ===
Japan lacks a major flood myth. The namazu is considered a creature that brings earthquakes, which in turn bring tsunamis, but they do not count as floods in a strict mythological sense. Japanese scholars in the 19th century such as Hirata Atsutane and Motoori Norinaga have used the global flood myths of other cultures to argue for the supremacy of Shinto and promote Japanese nationalism. They claimed that the fact that Japan has no flood myth showed that it was both the centre and highest point on Earth, making it the closest place on Earth to the heavens. As such, to them this demonstrates the veracity of the Japanese creation myth, where Japan comes first and foremost.

=== Korea ===
- Mokdoryung
- Namu doryeong

=== Malaysia ===
- Temuan
- Orang Seletar

=== Philippines ===
- Ifugao: One year, when the rainy season should have come, it did not. When the river dried up, the people dug into its grave, hoping to find the soul of the river. They struck a great spring, which angered the river gods. It began to rain and the river overflowed its banks. The resulting flood wiped out all of humanity save for two survivors, Wigan and Bugan, who repopulated the earth once the waters receded.
- Igorot: Once upon a time, when the world was flat and there were no mountains, there lived two brothers, sons of Lumawig, the Great Spirit. The brothers were fond of hunting, and since no mountains had formed there was no good place to catch wild pig and deer, and the older brother said: "Let us cause water to flow over all the world and cover it, and then mountains will rise up."

=== Thailand ===
The Origin of Humans from A Massive Magical Gourd, by Suradej Kaewthamai

There are many folktales among Tai peoples, included Zhuang, Thai, Shan and Lao, talking about the origin of them and the deluge from their Thean (แถน), supreme being object of faith.

- Pu Sangkasa-Ya Sangkasi (Thai: ปู่สังกะสา-ย่าสังกะสี) or Grandfather Sangkasa and Grandmother Sangkasi, according to the creation myth of those Tai people folktales, were the first man and woman created by the supreme god, Phu Ruthua (ผู้รู้ทั่ว). A thousand years passed, their descendants were wicked and crude as well as not interested in worshiping the supreme god. The god got angry and punished them with a great flood. Fortunately, some descendants survived because they fled into an enormous magical gourd. Many months passed, the supreme god had compassion on the humans that had to live in the difficult period of their life, so he had two deities Khun Luang and Khun Lai climbed down a massive vine linking an island heaven that floated in the sky to the earth in order to drill the enormous gourd and take the surviving humans to a new land. The water levels had been come down already and there was the dry land. The deities helped the surviving people and led them to the new land. When everyone arrived in the land called Mueang Thaen, the two deities taught the humans how to cultivate rice, farming and building structures.

=== Taiwan ===
- Saisiyat: An old white-haired man came to Oppehnaboon in a dream and told him that a great storm would soon come. Oppehnaboon built a boat. Only Oppehnaboon and his sister survived. They had a child, they cut the child into pieces and each piece became a new person. Oppehnaboon taught the new people their names and they went forth to populate the earth.

=== Vietnam ===
- Sơn Tinh – Thủy Tinh
- Virtually every Southeast Asian ethnic group in Vietnam tells a story of a great flood that leaves only 2 survivors who must consummate the marriage. Sometimes they are siblings, sometimes a woman and dog, but from this incestuous abnormality is born a gourd or a gourd-shaped lump of flesh, and the gourd becomes the source for various ethnic groups, according to Dang Nghiem Van, who explored the flood myths of Southeast Asia by collecting 307 flood myths in a field research in Vietnam in the early 90s, describing how they all have varying versions of essentially a similar story.

=== Siberia ===
- Ket: In the mythology of the Ket people of Northern Eurasia, there have been many floods in the past. People and animals survived by grabbing on to pieces of floating turf. In the future, a final flood will bring back ancient Ket heroes.

== Europe ==
=== Classical Antiquity ===
- Ancient Greek flood myths

=== Medieval Europe ===
==== Baltic area ====
- Vineta

==== Breton ====
- Ys

==== Cornish ====
- Lyonesse

==== Irish ====
- Lebor Gabála Érenn – Cessair

==== Welsh ====
- Dwyfan and Dwyfach
- Cantre'r Gwaelod

==== Bashkir ====
- Ural-batyr

=== Modern era folklore ===
==== Finnish ====
- Finnish flood myth

== Oceania ==
=== Australia ===
- Tiddalik: A water-holding frog awoke one morning with an extreme thirst, and began to drink until all the freshwater was consumed. Creatures and plant life everywhere began to die due to lack of moisture. Other animals devised a plan for him to release all of the water he had consumed by making him laugh. As Tiddalik laughed, the water rushed out of him to replenish the lakes, swamps and rivers.
- Lizards vs Platypuses: The world became overpopulated with birds, reptiles, and other animals. Therefore, a meeting took place in the Blue Mountains to mitigate this. Tiger Snake planned that birds and animals who have good mobility should migrate to a new country. The lizards, who knew about rainmaking, decided to rid the world of the platypuses, whereby instructing all of their family to perform the rain ceremony. The lizards fled to mountain tops, before a deluge covered the land below, destroying most of the world. The flood eventually ended and there were no platypuses. After some time Carpet Snake observed the existence of platypus. The animals discovered that they were all related to the platypuses, who were then invited back and treated as ancient value. Eventually the head platypus married into the bandicoot family, although platypuses were never comfortable with other animals.

=== Polynesia ===
- Nu'u
- Ruatapu
- Tāwhaki
