= Chinese flood myths =

Floods in Chinese mythology

Chinese flood myths are flood myths in Chinese mythology. In 1961, Derk Bodde stated that "from all mythological themes in ancient Chinese, the earliest and so far most pervasive is about flood." Chinese flood myths have shared characteristics with other flood myths all over the world, though they also have unique characteristics. Lu Yilu (2002) groups all flood myths into three different themes: "heroes control the flood"; "brother-sister marriage to repopulate the world"; and "the flood drowns the whole city along with its citizens".

== History and mythology ==
=== Literary history ===
The history of China as a continuously recorded literary tradition begins with the ancient documents transmitted for posterity through the Records of the Grand Historian. According to these, the great-grandson (or fourth successor) of the Yellow Emperor was Emperor Yao.

Beginning with the reign of Yao, additional literary sources become available, including the Book of Documents (collected and edited by Confucius), which begins with the "Canon of Yao" (堯典), describing the events of Yao's reign. However, the "Canon of Yao" is problematic in regards to textual transmission. At best, it seems to represent an early textual reconstruction, and at worst a fabrication based on available knowledge or sources from the 3rd or 4th centuries AD. "The Counsels of Yu the Great" (大禹謨) is considered to be one of the reliably transmitted pre-Qin texts. These and other texts of the preserved literature mark the beginnings of the Chinese historical tradition.

Other important texts include the poem Heavenly Questions collected in the Chu Ci, which is attributed to Qu Yuan and the famous mythological compendium Classic of Mountains and Seas (Shanhaijing). Centuries of scholarship have gone into piecing together a narrative from the bits, pieces, and occasionally longer sections found in these and other early sources, sometimes subjected to heavy editorial handling in terms of viewpoint.

=== Oral traditions ===
Besides having been preserved in various literary forms, mythological stories have also been collected from various oral traditions. Some of these folktales are still told. Some of these sources are from people of the Han ethnicity, and some are from other Chinese ethnic groups.

== Struggles to control the flood ==
The Zhou sources narrated struggles faced by heroes or deities in controlling the floods. Of all of these stories, the struggle of Yao, Gun, and Yu is the best example of a description of human effort to control the flood. Much later works from the Warring States period (Shiben) and Diwang Shiji (3rd century) paired Yu and Nuwa as a couple, allowing their previously uncorrelated stories to complete one another.

=== Gun-Yu Mythology ===
This myth recounts the efforts of Great Yu (and Gun) to control a great flood, and the origins of animal domestication. It is sometimes also associated with Emperor Yao and Shun. In it, Gun steals xirang to stop the flood while Great Yu channels the flood into the sea and succeeds in making the water level subside, so that the earth can be cultivated. Huainanzi states that the great flood was caused by the water god Gong Gong, who used the water to wreak havoc in the realm of Emperor Yao. Shan Hai Jing narrates another version, where the flood is caused by Xiangliu, one of Gong Gong's ministers, rather than Gong Gong himself.

There are many mythologies which are correlated to this theme, one of which concerns the "Dragon Gate" (Chinese: 龍門; pinyin: lóngmén), a canal through the mountains that was dug by Yu. While he was digging the canal, many of the carps were swept away and fell, and were disappointed because they couldn't swim back up to the upper level. Yu then promised them that if any of the carp could leap through his dam, it would transform into a dragon. This legend is a variant of the dragon gate myth, also known as the longmen myth.

=== Nuwa repairs heaven ===
Another story tells that the goddess Nüwa created (molded) humanity from yellow clay, brought them into life, and gave them the ability to reproduce. The water god Gonggong banged his head into Mount Buzhou, which was actually one of the pillars that supported the sky, causing a flood. Nüwa patched up the sky with five-colored pebbles and piled up reeds and ashes to stop the flood.

=== The extinction of human race ===
Chen Jianxian (1996) said that this theme was one of some popular legends which was still being told by more than 40 ethnics in China. There is a possibility that the myth is rather new because the oldest recorded sources about this myth were from Six Dynasties, save that the oral tradition may be much older.

The theme was made into several versions, but the outline is about a great flood which was destroyed all the humans all over the world except a pair of brother and sister, or aunt and nephew. Both were forced to marry in order to repopulated the world. One version stated that their children were ordinary humans, while the others said it was a lump of meat, squash, melon, or grindstone; after they opened, cut, or destroyed it, humans emerged.

=== Sinking city ===
This theme have some specific characteristics: one or two people were survived, the statue which was crying blood, and the whole city along with its citizens were sinking. The survivor(s) was being saved by the gods because of his/her benevolent acts; may be an old lady or a devoted son. The blood crying statue was often a stone lion statue, or sometimes tortoise statue.

== Other flood myths ==
=== East Sea and Mulberry Field ===
A less widespread flood myth involves the goddess Magu: this myth involves the cyclic rise and fall of the ocean level over the eons: sometimes the sea floor is under water; at other times, it turns into mulberry fields. However, the material about Magu seems to be distinct from the idea of a great flood upon the land of China.

One tradition narrates Magu, a benevolent Taoist lady who lived on the second century. She was reclaiming a very wide seashore water bodies on Jiangsu and changing it into mulberry fields.

=== Heyu ===
Shan Hai Jing mentions a pig-like creature with human face, yellow-colored and red-tailed, and it sounds like human singing. The creature is known as Heyu; it preys on human, reptiles, and snakes. It appearance is a sign that there will be a great deluge all over the world.

== See also ==
- Chinese myth
- Flood myth
