= Huanglong Zhenren =

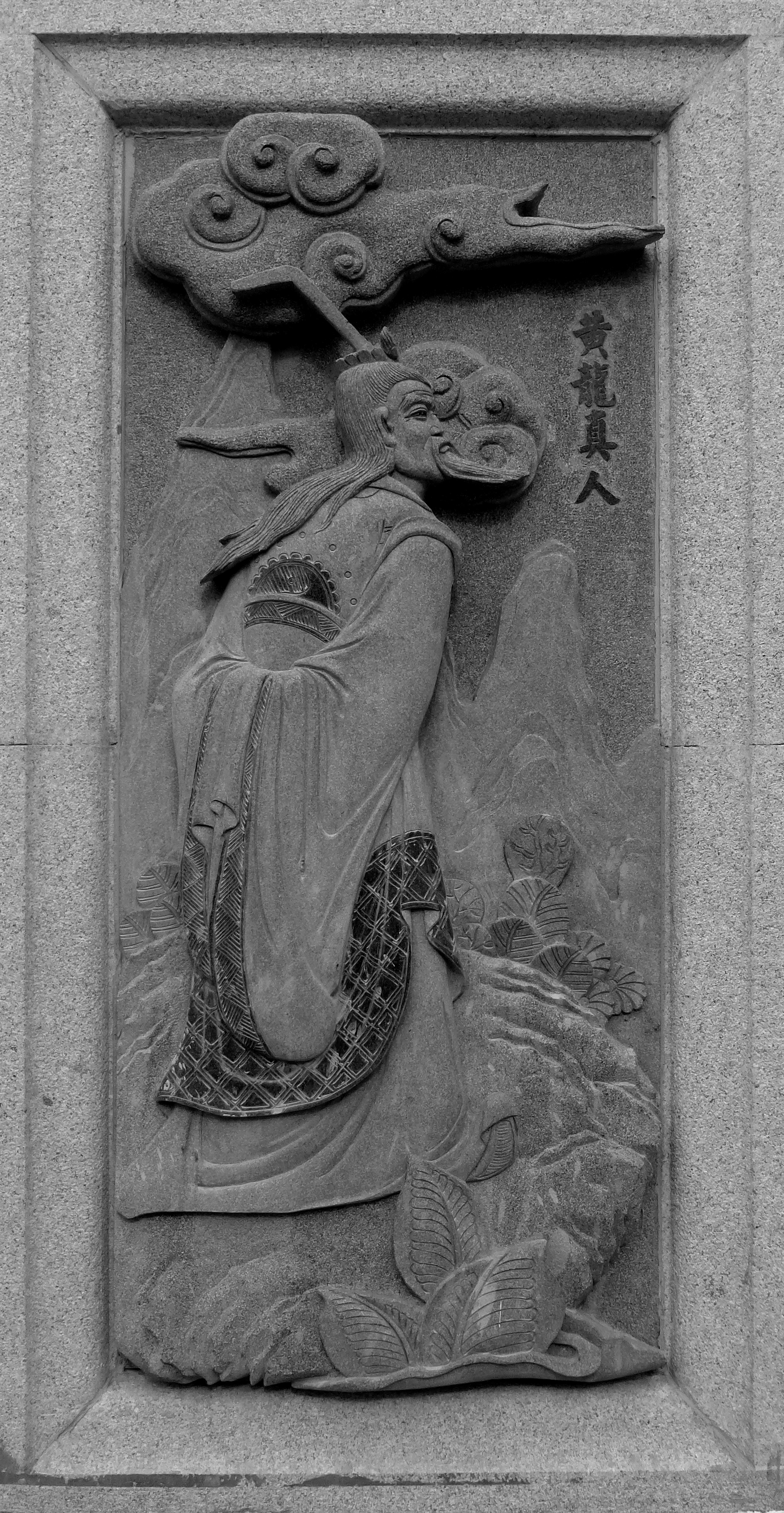
Relief of Huanglong Zhenren

Huanglong Zhenren (Chinese: 黄龙真人; pinyin: Huánglóng Zhēnrén; lit. 'the Yellow Dragon Immortal') is an immortal in the Chinese novel Investiture of the Gods (Fengshen Yanyi). He is one of the Twelve Golden Immortals (十二金仙) of the Chan Sect (阐教) and a disciple of Yuanshi Tianzun.

In local legends from Sichuan, Huanglong Zhenren is identified with a yellow dragon (黄龙) that helped Yu the Great control the Great Flood. One story says the dragon saved Yu's boat from dangerous waves. After the flood, Yu asked heaven to reward the dragon, but it refused the offer and stayed in the mountains.

== Fengshen Yanyi ==
In Investiture of the Gods, Huanglong Zhenren resides in Magu Cave (麻姑洞) on Erxian Mountain (二仙山). His mount is a white crane, and he uses a pair of swords as weapons. A modern discussion of the novel describes Huanglong Zhenren as the "poorest" (贫民玩家) of the Twelve Golden Immortals, noting that he has no magical treasures or disciples unlike some of the other immortals.

Huanglong Zhenren is defeated or captured in several encounters in the novel. During the battle against the plague deity Lü Yue, he is unable to withstand Lü Yue's three-headed, six-armed form and retreats. Lü Yue pursues him, but Nezha intervenes and prevents his death. Later, during the Ten Thousand Immortals Array (万仙阵), Huanglong fights the Jie Sect immortal Ma Sui. Ma Sui throws a magical golden hoop (金箍) at him, which clamps onto his head and causes him intense pain. None of the other immortals can remove it, and Yuanshi Tianzun eventually removes the hoop himself.

== Local folklore ==
In Sichuan, people tell stories about Huanglong Zhenren. He is said to have lived and practised Daoism in the area now called Huanglong. He later became an immortal. Huanglong Temple (黄龙寺) was built in his honor.

One legend says a yellow dragon helped Yu the Great control the Great Flood. Yu once saw nine dragons lying in front of him. He thought they were snakes. One dragon died from anger, while the others ran away. The yellow dragon was also angry and wanted revenge. Later, strong winds and waves almost sank Yu's boat. The yellow dragon saw that an evil spirit was trying to kill Yu. It changed its mind and fought the spirit. The dragon won the fight and carried Yu's boat upstream. This helped Yu find the source of the Min River. After the flood, Yu asked heaven to reward the dragon. But the dragon did not want to go to heaven. It stayed in the mountains, where people later built a temple for it.

There are other stories about Huanglong Zhenren. One says he was a yellow dragon who became an immortal after practising Daoism. Another says he was a Di–Qiang chief who could turn into a yellow dragon. According to a Qiang story, the chief helped Yu control the floods. He later lived in Muni Valley (牟尼沟) before going to Huanglong Valley to practise Daoism. In Tibetan tradition, Huanglong Zhenren is linked to Xiongpa Lama (雄帕喇嘛), who is said to have opened a gate at Mount Xuebaoding.

Another story says Huanglong Zhenren appeared in people's dreams as an old man with a white beard. He warned people living near the Min River that a flood was coming. He told them to move to higher ground. Some people believed him and moved away. Others stayed behind. Soon, the river flooded and many people died. The people who survived later went upstream to look for the old man. They found a clay statue of Huanglong Zhenren in a cave near the river's source. They believed he was the man from their dreams and built Huanglong Temple to honor him.

One story tells how the golden terraces of Huanglong were formed. After becoming an immortal, Huanglong Zhenren invited his fellow Daoists to a feast. He asked two disciples to prepare soy milk for the guests. But they made the fire too hot, and the boiling soy milk spilled from the pot and ran down the hillside. When Huanglong returned, he threw sand over the spilled soy milk, making it harden. People say this formed the golden terraces now called "Golden Sand Paving the Earth" (金沙铺地).

The Huanglong Temple Fair is held every year on the fifteenth day of the sixth lunar month. Local people believe Huanglong Zhenren became an immortal on this day. Han, Tibetan, Qiang and Hui people come to the temple to pray, sing and dance. The fair usually begins on the twelfth day and ends on the sixteenth. Satoshi Ninomiya notes that it is unclear whether the Huanglong Zhenren of these local stories is the same figure who appears in Fengshen Yanyi.

== Interpretations ==
Chen Hong believes that Huanglong Zhenren's character in Investiture of the Gods was influenced by an old story about Lü Dongbin and a Buddhist monk named Huanglong. In the Buddhist version, Lü Dongbin tries to attack the monk with his flying sword but loses. Other versions written from a Daoist view have Lü Dongbin defeat the monk instead. Chen sees these different stories as part of the rivalry between Buddhism and Daoism.

Chen also believes that the author made Huanglong Zhenren look foolish on purpose. Although he is one of the Twelve Golden Immortals, he often loses fights and has to be rescued by others. Zhao Gongming captures him and hangs him from a pole, while Ma Sui defeats him with a golden hoop. Chen argues that these scenes may have been written to make fun of the Buddhist Huanglong. In his view, the novel gives Daoism the upper hand by making a character named Huanglong suffer repeated defeats.

== In popular culture ==
Huanglong Zhenren appears in the Chinese web novel Huanglong Zhenren's Journey to Another World (黄龙真人异界游) by Shen Jian (神见). In the story, he travels to another world after the war in Investiture of the Gods. There, he becomes much stronger and gains powerful magical weapons. This is different from the original novel, where he has few magical treasures and often loses fights.
