= Magu (deity) =

Taoist immortal

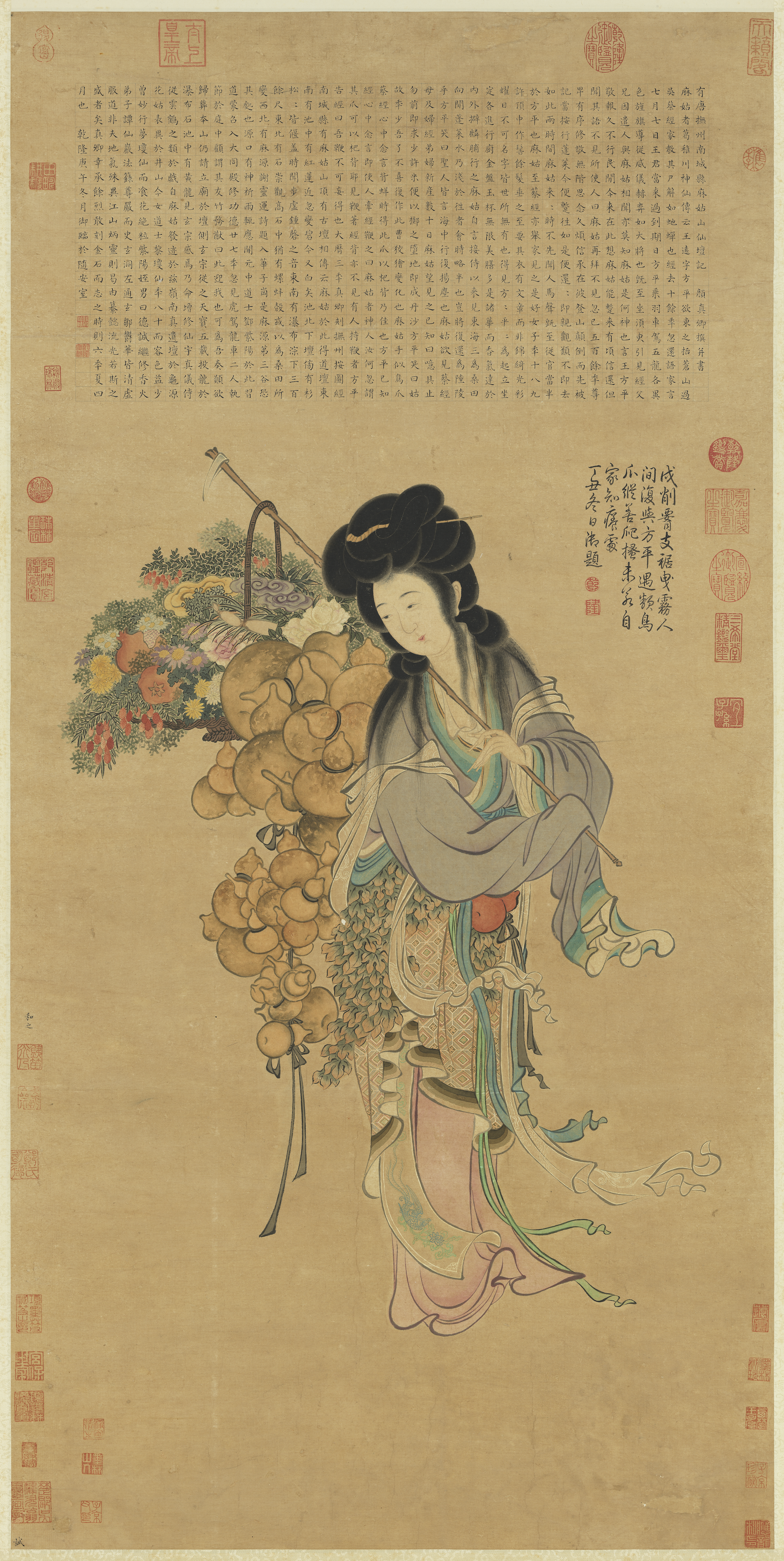
Portrait of the Immortal Magu (National Palace Museum, Taipei)

Magu (Chinese: 麻姑; pinyin: Mágū; Wade–Giles: Ma-ku; lit. 'Hemp Maiden') is a legendary Taoist xian (仙; 'immortal', 'transcendent') associated with the elixir of life, and a symbolic protector of women in Chinese mythology. Stories in Chinese literature describe Magu as a beautiful young woman with long birdlike fingernails, while early myths associate her with caves. Magu xian shou (麻姑獻壽; 'Magu gives her birthday greetings') is a popular motif in Chinese art.

== Name ==
The logographic meaning of 麻姑 ("Magu") is given as "Hemp Maiden" or "Hemp Goddess." Eberhard and Campany both doubt that this was the original name or interpretation. Needham explores a potential connection to Taoist ritual practices involving the burning of hemp seeds. Campany references a story recorded by Liu Jingshu (劉敬叔), about Meigu (梅姑 "Plum Maid"). Campany says that some versions of Liu Jingshu's story refer to the same persona as 麻姑 ("Magu"). Magu is called Mago in Korean and Mako in Japanese. In Japan, Mako is usually referenced in connection to the Chinese story (below) about Magu's long fingernails, for instance, the phrase Mako sōyō (麻姑掻痒 "Magu scratches the itch") metaphorically means "things going like one imagined".

== Cultic origins ==
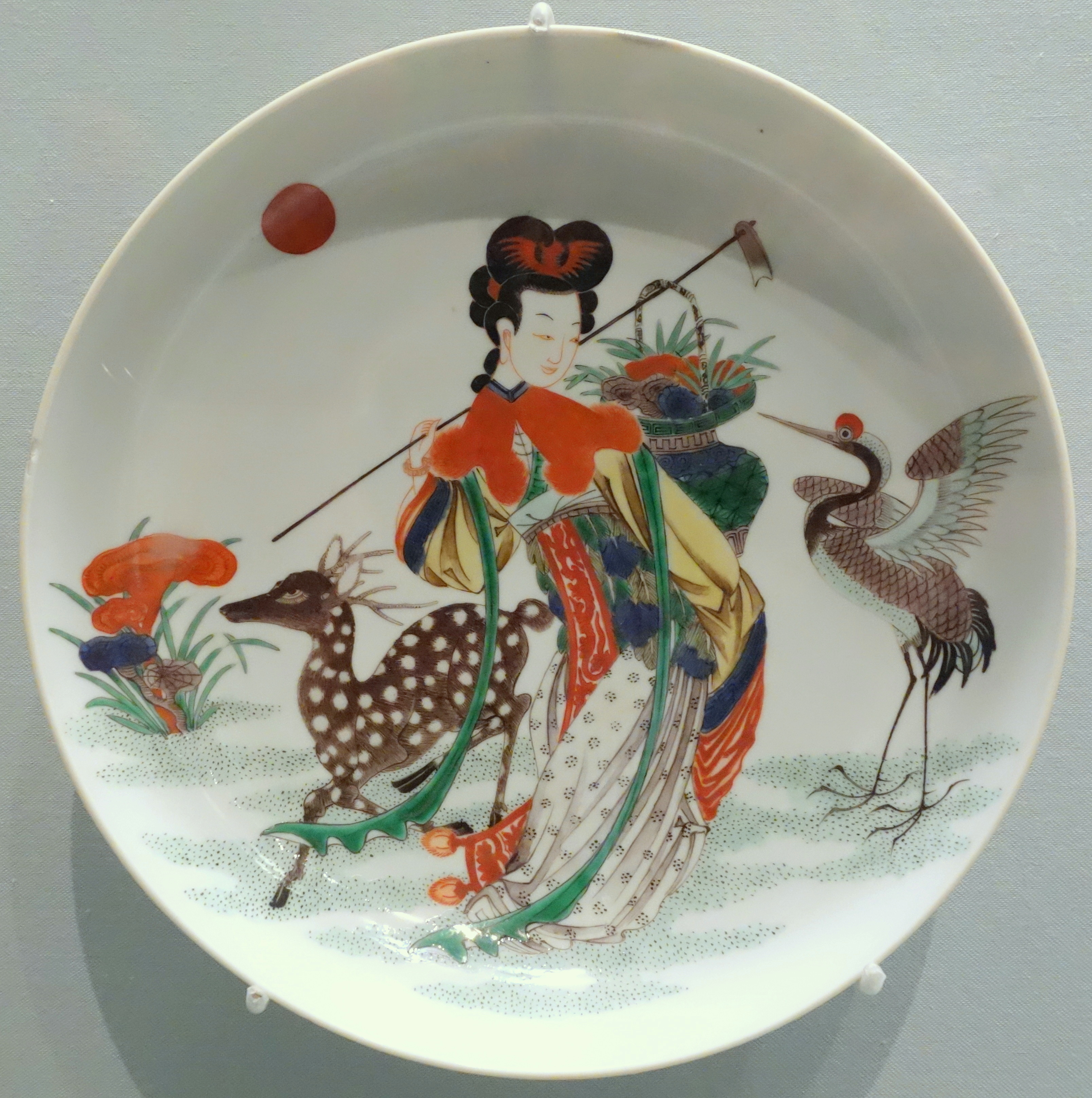
Porcelain dish with overglaze decoration depicting Magu, deity of longevity, Jingdezhen, Jiangxi province, Qing dynasty, c. 18th century, Asian Art Museum of San Francisco.

While Magu folktales are familiar in East Asia, the sociologist Wolfram Eberhard was the first Western scholar to analyze them. He categorized Magu under a cultural chain of Yao love songs and festivals. Based on references in Chinese texts, Eberhard proposed two centers for the Magu cult, in the present-day provinces of Jiangxi and Hubei. Evidence for an "original cultic center" near Nancheng (南城) county in southwestern Jiangxi includes several place names, and, among them, two mountains'. The famous Magu Shan (麻姑山 "Magu Mountain") is located in Nancheng, and Taoists regard its Danxia Dong (丹霞洞 "Cinnabar Cloud Grotto"), as the 28th of 36 sacred dongtian (洞天 "Grotto-heavens, heaven-reaching grottos"). The famous Tang dynasty Daoist calligrapher Yan Zhenqing visited Mt Magu and inscribed the Magu Shan Xiantan Ji (痲姑山仙壇記 "Record of the Mountain Platform where Magu Ascended to Immortality"). A second Magu Mountain is located in Jianchang county (建昌, near Nanfeng 南豐). Magu Wine (麻姑酒) is made in Jianchang and nearby Linchuan. In addition, Magu is an alternate name for Huagu (華姑 "flower maid") Mountain in Xuancheng county of Anhui. Evidence for a secondary area for the Magu cult in Hubei includes the Song dynasty temple near Hankou, along with the Magu Temple on Mount Heng. Several early folktales from Sichuan province associate Magu with caves and one describes a shaman who invoked her. Regarding the traditions that she was born in Jiangxi and became an immortal xian in Shandong, Eberhard says, "This ascent to heaven, typical of Taoists, connects her with the immortal saints, and indeed she is regarded as a symbol of long life and rebirth, and therefore in the Chinese drama, appears a good omen during birthday celebrations."

== Early descriptions ==
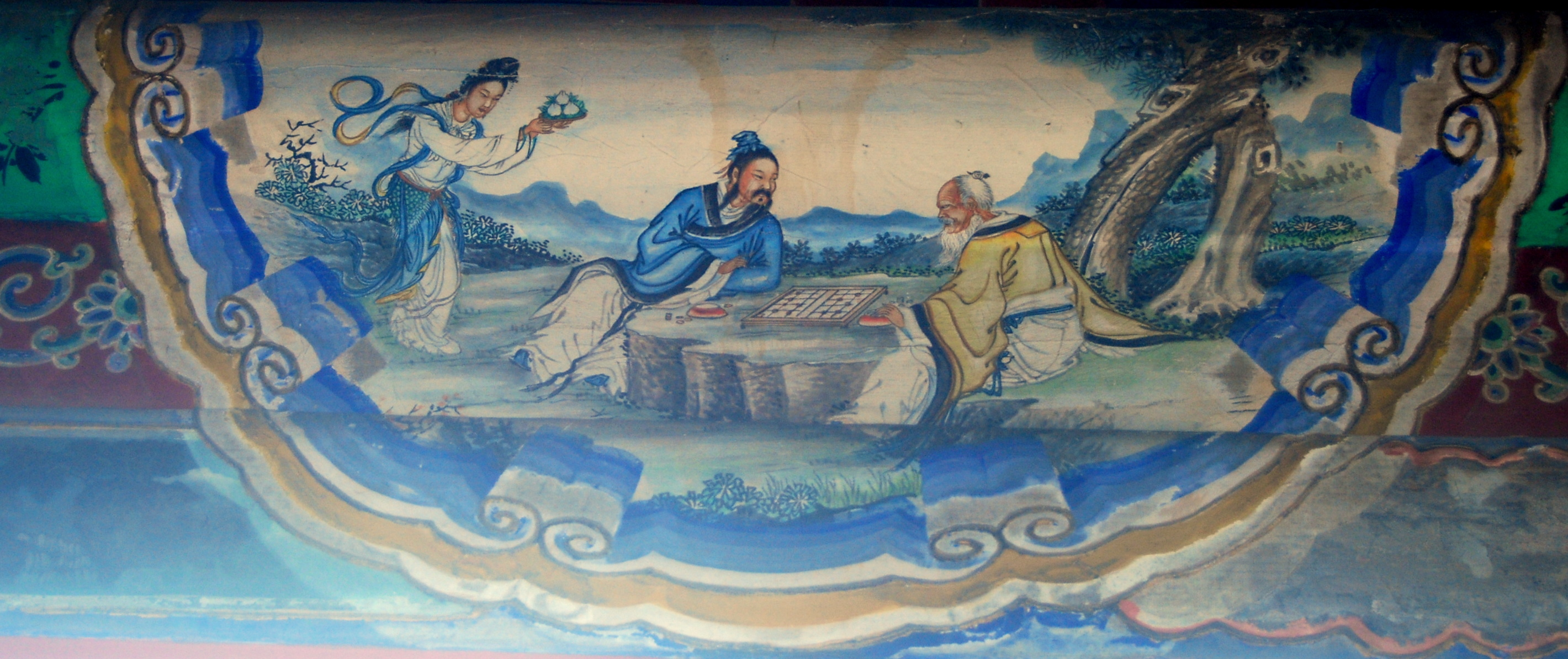
麻姑献寿 Magu Presents Longevity, late 19th-century mural in the Summer Palace's Long Corridor.

Scholar Robert Campany provides details of Magu mythology in his annotated translation of Ge Hong's Traditions of Divine Transcendents (Shenxian zhuan (神仙傳), ca. 317 CE) and compares four Chinese textual variations of Magu stories.

In the Traditions of Divine Transcendents, a story about Wang Yuan (王遠) contains the longest early descriptions of her. Wang was supposedly a Confucianist scholar who quit his official post during the reign (146–168 CE) of Emperor Huan of Han and went into the mountains to become a Daoist xian. Later, while traveling in Wu (modern Zhejiang), Wang met Cai Jing 蔡經, whose physiognomy indicated he was destined to become an immortal, and taught him the basic techniques. After Cai had been gone for "over a decade", he suddenly returned home, looking like a young man, announced that Lord Wang would visit on the "seventh day of the seventh month" (later associated with the Cowherd and Weaver Girl lovers' festival), and ordered preparations for a feast. After Wang and his celestial entourage arrived on the auspicious "double-seven" day, he invited Magu to join their celebration because "It has been a long time since you were in the human realm." She replied by invisible messenger. "Maid Ma bows and says: 'Without our realizing it, more than five hundred years have passed since our last meeting!'" After apologizing that she would be delayed owing to an appointment at Penglai Mountain (a legendary island in the Eastern Sea, where the elixir of immortality grows), Ma arrived four hours later.

She appeared to be a handsome woman of eighteen or nineteen; her hair was done up, and several loose strands hung down to her waist. Her gown had a pattern of colors, but it was not woven; it shimmered, dazzling the eyes, and was indescribable – it was not of this world. She approached and bowed to Wang, who bade her rise. When they were both seated, they called for the travelling canteen. The servings were piled up on gold platters and in jade cups without limit. There were rare delicacies, many of them made from flowers and fruits, and their fragrance permeated the air inside [Cai's home] and out. When the meat was sliced and served, [in flavor] it resembled broiled mo, and was announced as kirin meat.
Maid Ma declared: "Since I entered your service, I have seen the Eastern Sea turn to mulberry fields three times. As one proceeded across to Penglai, the water came only up to one's waist. I wonder whether it will turn to dry land once again." Wang answered with a sigh, "Oh, the sages all say that the Eastern Sea will once again become blowing dust."

This "traveling canteen" is the xingchu (行廚), an exotic banquet that xian transcendents have the ability to summon at will.

Magu legends frequently mention these mulberry fields in the East Sea. When Magu was introduced to the women in Cai's family, she transformed some rice into pearls as a trick to avoid the unclean influences of a recent childbirth. Then Wang presented Cai's family with a strong liquor from "the celestial kitchens", and warned that it was "unfit for drinking by ordinary people". Even after diluting the liquor with water, everyone became intoxicated and wanted more.

Maid Ma's fingernails resembled bird claws. When Cai Jing noticed them, he thought to himself, "My back itches. Wouldn't it be great if I could get her to scratch my back with those nails?" Now, Wang Yuan knew what Cai was saying in his heart, so he ordered him bound and whipped, chiding, "Maid Ma is a divine personage. How dare you think that her nails could scratch your back!" The whip lashing Cai's back was the only thing visible; no one was seen wielding it. Wang added, "My whippings are not given without cause."

Some later versions of this legend say Ma was Wang's sister. The poet Li Bai immortalized two Classical Chinese expressions from this story. Magu saobei (麻姑掻背 "Magu scratches [my] back") refers to her extraordinary fingernails. Canghai sangtian (滄海桑田 "blue ocean [turns to] mulberry fields") means "great changes over the course of time"; Needham says early Daoists observed seashells in mountainous rocks and recognized the vast scale of geologic transformations.

The Lieyi zhuan (列異傳 "Arrayed Marvels", late 2nd or early 3rd century), attributed to Cao Pi (187–226 CE) has three stories about Wang Fangping.

The third gives a version of the incident of Cai Jing's inappropriate fantasy concerning Maid Ma and her luxuriant four-inch nails. Here, Cai Jing's home is located in Dongyang; he is not whipped but rather flung to the ground, his eyes running blood; and Maid Ma herself, identified as "a divine transcendent" (shenxian), is the one who reads his thoughts and does the punishing.

Kohn includes a woodblock from the illustrated Zengxiang Liexian zhuan.

The Yiyuan (異苑 "Garden of Marvels", early 5th century), by Liu Jingshu (劉敬叔), records a story about Meigu (梅姑 "Plum Maid") or Magu, and suggests her cult originated during the Qin dynasty (221–206 BCE).

During Qin times, there was a Temple to Maid Mei 梅 – or, as one version has it, Maid Ma – beside a lake. When alive, she had possessed arts of the Dao. She could walk on water in her shoes. Later she violated the laws of the Dao, and her husband, out of anger, murdered her and dumped her body in the lake. Following the current, it floated on the waves until it reached the [present site of] the temple. A subordinate shaman directed that she be encoffined but not immediately buried. Very soon a square, lacquered coffin appeared in the shrine hall. [From then on], at the end and beginning of each lunar month, people there could make out through the fog an indistinct figure, wearing shoes. Fishing and hunting were prohibited in the area of the temple, and violators would always become lost or drown. Shamans said that it was because the Maid had suffered a painful death and hates to see other beings cruelly killed.

Campany reads this legend to describe founding a temple, probably on Lake Gongting, and translates these "shaman" and "shrine" references in the future tense. Compare the present tense translation of Miyakawa who interprets her body floating to an existing temple.

The Qi Xie ji (齊諧記, 6th century) associates Magu with snakes. It describes her as a commoner from Fuyang, Zhejiang, rather than a Daoist transcendent, who loved raw meat hash. She captured a strange beast resembling a sea turtle and a serpent, and ate it with her companion Hua Ben (華本 "Flower Root"). When Ma started choking, Hua could see a snake flicking its tongue inside her mouth. She later enjoyed a meal at Hua's house, but upon learning that they had eaten snake meat, she vomited blood and died. Campany concludes:

This story hints at an even older stratum of legend behind the Maid Ma cult: like other territorial gods known to Chinese religious history, she may have begun as a theriomorphic deity (perhaps snake-headed) who gradually metamorphosed into a human being and finally – the process culminating in Ge Hong's Traditions narrative – into a full-fledged transcendent. Seen in this light, several details of the Traditions hagiography might be read as betraying these chthonic origins. Among these are Maid Ma's long nails, the featuring of meat dishes among the fantastic foods served by the travelling canteen, and the scene describing the "summoning" of Maid Ma, which is reminiscent of shamanic invocations of deities to attend spirit-writing sessions.

== Hemp goddess ==
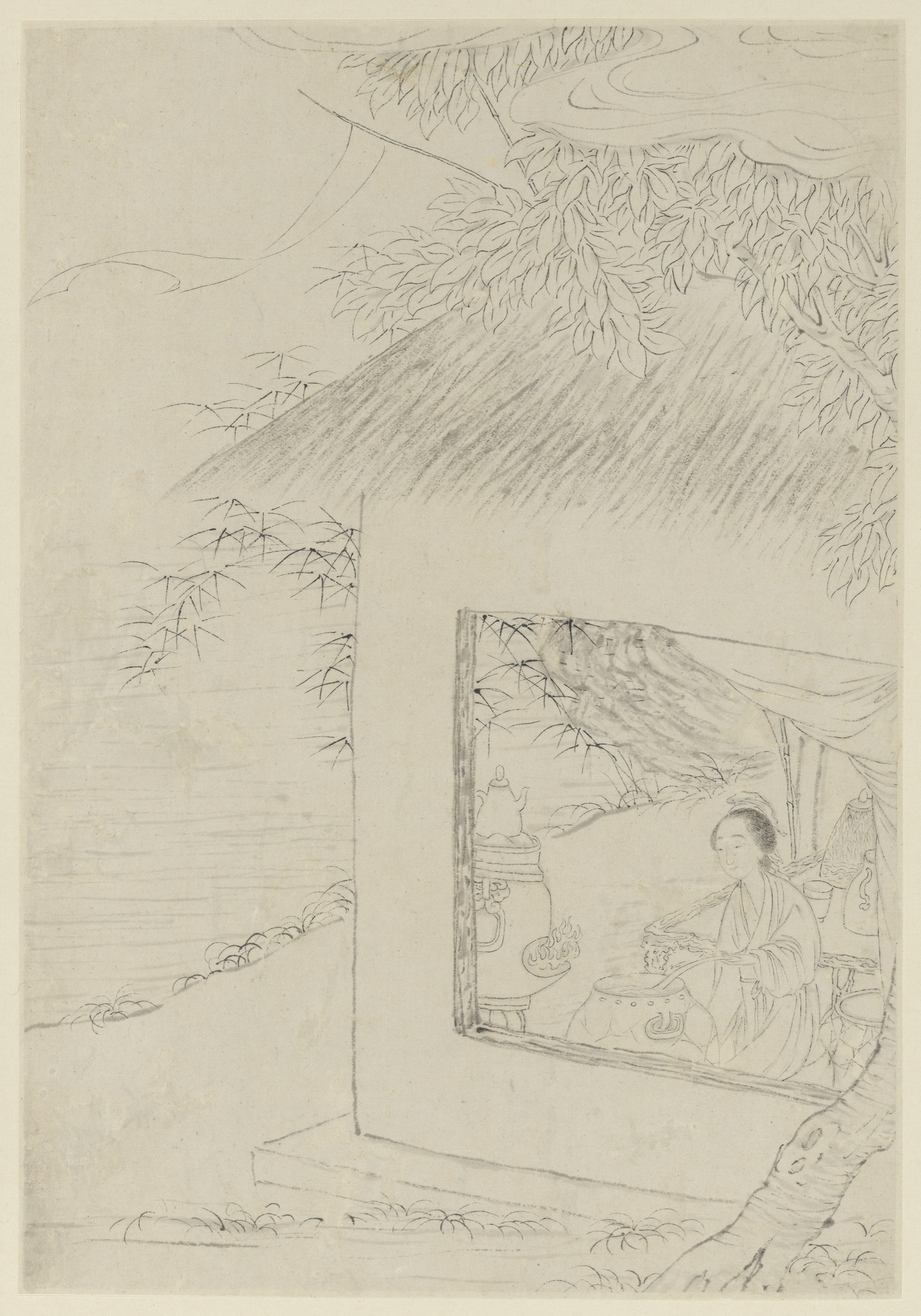
"Maiden Magu Selling Wine" from Album of Famous Women, 1799

Hellmut Wilhelm's book review of Eberhard's original German book suggested that Magu was associated with cannabis. Eberhard dismissed this hypothesis in the English version.

I have no indication that the goddess ever was a goddess of the hemp plant (ma) as H. Wilhelm surmised (Monumenta Serica vol. 9, p. 213 note 9). She often wears aboriginal attire, a dress with a collar made of leaves, but not of hemp, which only sometimes has developed, according to a late fashion into a cape of cloth.

Campany mentions the Chinese use of ma "hemp" fibers as a weaving material. "(Note also her shimmering, multicolored gown, "not of this world"; but we are told that it was not woven, at least not in an ordinary way.) I know of no attempt to explain the name Ma gu (literally, "the Hemp Maiden")."

The historian and sinologist Joseph Needham connected myths about Magu "the Hemp Damsel" with early Daoist religious usages of cannabis. Cannabis sativa is described by the oldest Chinese pharmacopeia, the (ca. 100 CE) Shennong Bencaojing 神農本草經 ("Shennong's Materia Medica Classic"). "The flowers when they burst (when the pollen is scattered) are called 麻蕡 [mafen] or 麻勃 [mabo]. The best time for gathering is the 7th day of the 7th month. The seeds are gathered in the 9th month. The seeds which have entered the soil are injurious to man. It grows on Mount Tai." Needham pointed out that Magu was goddess of Shandong's sacred Mount Tai, where cannabis "was supposed to be gathered on the seventh day of the seventh month, a day of seance banquets in the Taoist communities". The (ca. 570 CE) Daoist encyclopedia Wushang Biyao 無上秘要 records that cannabis was added into ritual censers.

The Shangqing School of Taoism provides a good example. Yang Xi (330-c. 386 CE) was "aided almost certainly by cannabis" in writing the Shangqing scriptures during nightly visitations by Taoist "immortals". Tao Hongjing (456–536 CE), who edited the official Shangqing canon, also recorded, "Hemp-seeds ([mabo] 麻勃) are very little used in medicine, but the magician-technicians ([shujia] 術家) say that if one consumes them with ginseng it will give one preternatural knowledge of events in the future."

Needham concluded,

Thus all in all there is much reason for thinking that the ancient Taoists experimented systematically with hallucinogenic smokes, using techniques which arose directly out of liturgical observance. … At all events the incense-burner remained the centre of changes and transformations associated with worship, sacrifice, ascending perfume of sweet savour, fire, combustion, disintegration, transformation, vision, communication with spiritual beings, and assurances of immortality. Wai tan and nei tan met around the incense-burner. Might one not indeed think of it as their point of origin?

== Korea ==
In Korean mythology, Magu is called Mago Halmi (Korean: 마고할미; lit. 'Grandmother Mago'), the giant goddess of creation.

== See also ==
- He Xiangu
- Mulberry fields (idiom)
- Queen Mother of the West
- Shen (Chinese religion)
- Wei Huacun
- Xian (Taoism)

== Bibliography ==
- Campany, Robert Ford (2002). To Live As Long As Heaven and Earth: Ge Hong's Traditions of Divine Transcendents. University of California Press.
- Eberhard, Wolfram (1968) [1943]. The Local Cultures of South and East China. E.J. Brill. OCLC 1006434315.
- Li, Hui-lin (1974). "An archaeological and historical account of cannabis in China". Economic Botany. 28 (4): 437–47. Bibcode:1973EcBot..28..437L. doi:10.1007/BF02862859. S2CID 19866569.
- Needham, Joseph (1974). "Volume 5, Chemistry and Chemical Technology; Part 2, Spagyrical Discovery and Invention: Magisteries of Gold and Immortality". Science and Civilisation in China. Cambridge University Press. ISBN 9780521085717.
- Wilhelm, Hellmut (1944). "[Review of] "Wolfram Eberhard: Untersuchungen über den Aufbau der chinesischen Kultur II. Teil 2: Die Lokalkulturen des Südens und Ostens"". Monumenta Serica. 9: 209–230. doi:10.1080/02549948.1944.11745193.

Footnotes
