= Feather Mountain =

Mountain in Chinese myth

Feather Mountain (Chinese: 羽山; pinyin: Yǔshān) is one of many important mythological mountains in Chinese mythology, particularly associated with the Great Flood. According to the mythological studies of Lihui Yang, Gun was executed on the "outskirts" of Feather Mountain by Zhu Rong, either for stealing the xirang or for failing to control the flood waters. According to K. C. Wu, Emperor Shun exiled Gun to Feather Mountain for lèse-majesté, but that Gun was not executed; and, rather, that such accounts result from misunderstanding the meanings associated with the ancient Chinese character jí (殛), which appears in certain source works.

Anthony Christie relays the following three mythic story versions: that on Yushan, Gun was either killed by Zhu Rong, torn into pieces by tortoises and owls, or else that his lifeless-seeming body lay there for three years before being slashed open at the belly with the Wu sword, after which his son Yu emerged as a winged dragon and Gun himself metamorphosed into a yellow bear. According to Zuozhuan, Gun falls into an abyss called Yuyuan (Chinese: 羽渊; pinyin: yúyuān) after becoming a bear.

== See also ==
- Heavenly Questions
- Kunlun Mountain: a mythical mountain, dwelling of various divinities, and fabulous plants and animals
- Yushan (mountain): in some accounts the dwelling of Xi Wangmu
- Mount Buzhou: mythical mountain
- Mount Penglai: paradise; a fabled fairy isle on the China Sea
