= Great Flood (China) =

Myth described in Chinese mythology

The Great Flood of Gun-Yu (Chinese: 鯀禹治水, romanized: Gǔn yǔ zhìshuǐ), also known as the Gun-Yu myth, was a major flood in ancient China that allegedly continued for at least two generations, which resulted in great population displacements among other disasters, such as storms and famine. People left their homes to live on the high hills and mountains, or nest on the trees. According to mythological and historical sources, it is traditionally dated to the third millennium BCE, or about 2300–2200 BCE, during the reign of Emperor Yao.

Treated either historically or mythologically, the story of the Great Flood and the heroic attempts of the various human characters to control it and to abate the disaster is a narrative fundamental to Chinese culture. Among other things, the Great Flood of China is key to understanding the history of the founding of both the Xia dynasty and the Zhou dynasty. It is also one of the main flood motifs in Chinese mythology, and it is a major source of allusion in Classical Chinese poetry.

== Overview ==
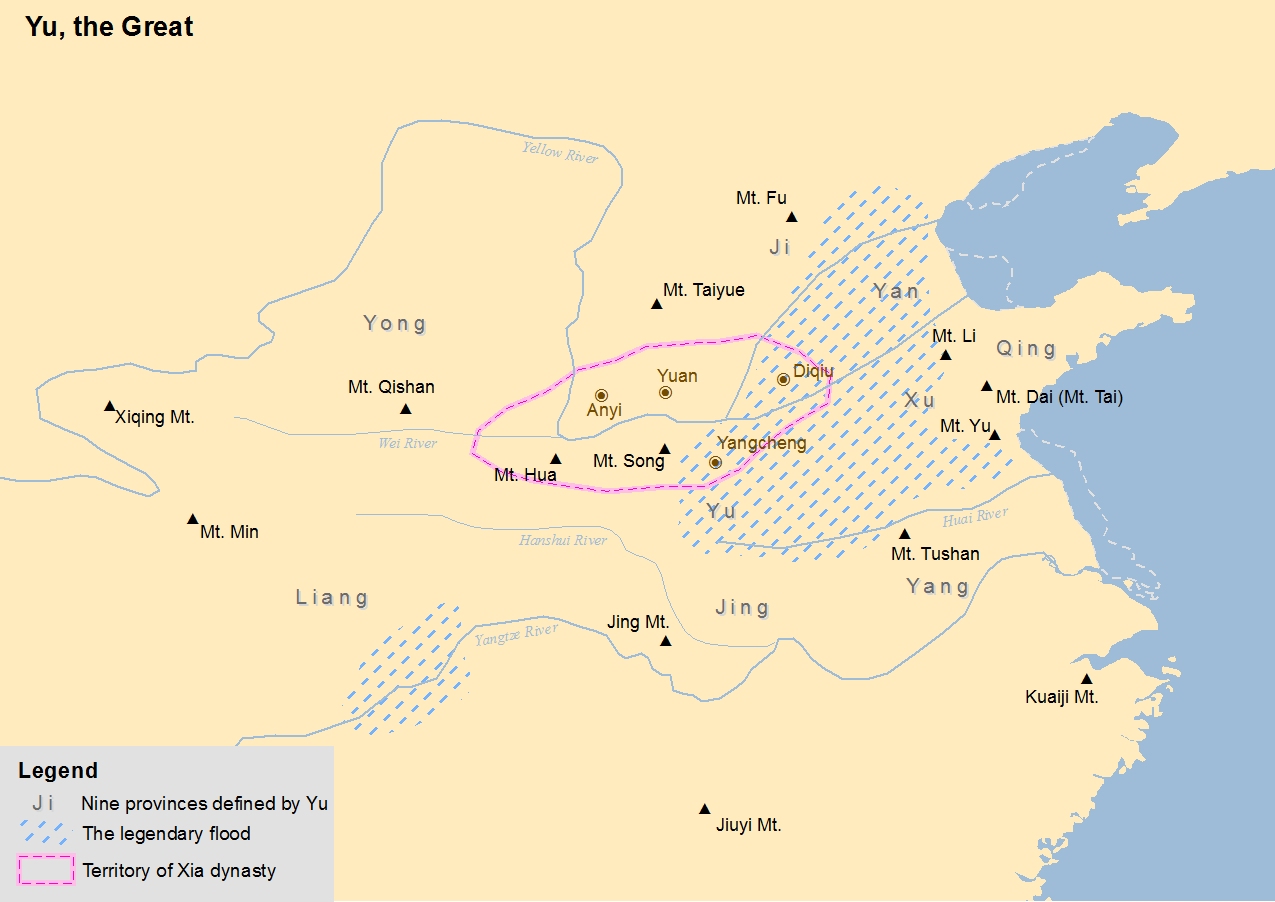
Map showing the legendary flood and the Nine Provinces of ancient China.

The story of the Great Flood plays a dramatic role in Chinese mythology, and its various versions present a number of examples of the flood myth motif around the world. Flood narratives in Chinese mythology share certain common features, despite being somewhat lacking in internal consistency as well as incorporating various magical transformations and divine or semi-divine interventions like Nüwa. For example, the flood usually results from natural causes rather than "universal punishment for human sin". Another distinct motif of the myth of the Great Flood of China is an emphasis on the heroic and praiseworthy efforts to mitigate the disaster; flooding is alleviated by constructing dikes and dams (such as the efforts of Gun), digging canals (as devised by Yu the Great), widening or deepening existing channels, and teaching these skills to others.

Another key motif is the development of civilization and bettering the human situation despite the disaster of the deluge. During the course of fighting, surviving, and eventually getting the inundation problems under control, much progress was also made in terms of land management, beast control, and agricultural techniques. These and other developments are integral to the narrative, and exemplify a wider approach to human health and societal well being than emergency management of the flood and its immediate effects. According to legend, a comprehensive approach to societal development resulted not only in wide-scale cooperation and large-scale efforts to control the flood but also led to the establishment of the first dynastic state of China, the Xia dynasty (c.2070–c.1600 BCE).

A study on the ~1920 BCE flood published in 2016 suggested that the concurrence of these major natural and sociopolitical events known through the geological, historiographical, and archaeological records may not simply be coincidence but rather an illustration of a profound and complicated cultural response to an extreme natural disaster that connected many groups living along the Yellow River.

== Narrative ==
=== Flood begins ===
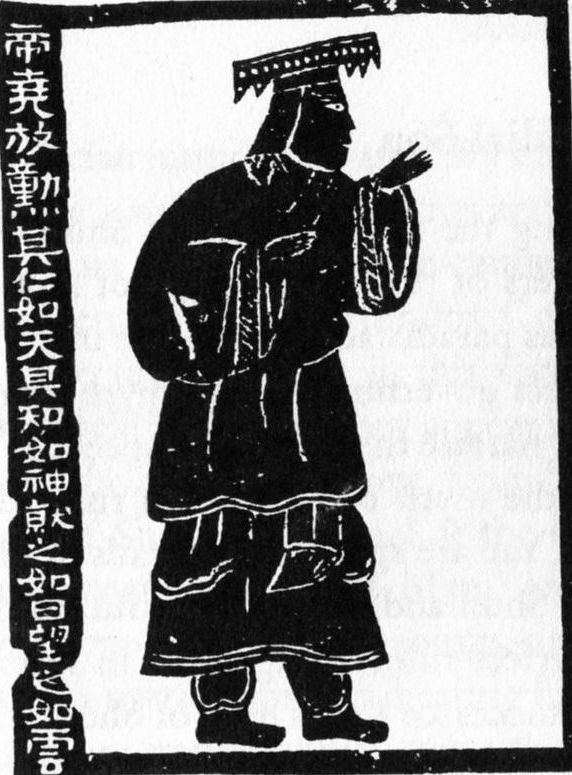
Emperor Yao. Inscription reads: "The Emperor Yao, Fang Xun, was humane like Heaven itself, and wise like a divine being; to be near him was like approaching the sun, to look at him was like gazing into clouds".

It was during the reign of Emperor Yao that the Great Flood began, a flood so vast that no part of Yao's territory was spared, and both the Yellow River and the Yangtze valleys flooded. The alleged nature of the flood is shown in the following quotation:

Like endless boiling water, the flood is pouring forth destruction. Boundless and overwhelming, it overtops hills and mountains. Rising and ever rising, it threatens the very heavens. How the people must be groaning and suffering!

— Emperor Yao, as quoted in the Book of History, describing the flood

According to both historical and mythological sources, the flooding continued relentlessly. Yao sought to find someone who could control the flood, and turned for advice to his special adviser, or advisers, the Four Mountains (四嶽 or 四岳, Sìyuè); who, after deliberation, gave Emperor Yao some advice which he did not especially welcome.

=== Yao appoints Gun ===
Upon the insistence of Four Mountains, and over Yao's initial hesitation, the person Yao finally consented to appoint in charge of controlling the flood was Gun, the Prince of Chong, who was a distant relative of Yao's through common descent from the Yellow Emperor.

=== Gun's efforts ===
According to the main mythological tradition, Gun's plan of flood control was through the use of a miraculously continuously self-expanding soil, Xirang. Gun chose to obtain the Xirang by stealing it from the Supreme Divinity, which he did; however, the Supreme Divinity became quite angered at this importunity. Year in and year out, many times, and to great extents; Gun applied the magical Xirang earth in attempt to block and barricade the flood waters with dams, dikes, and embankments (which he built with the special powers of the magic soil). However, Gun was never able to abate the problems of the Great Flood. Whether his failure to abate the flood was due to divine wrath or to engineering defects remains an unanswered question – although one pointed out over two thousand years ago by Qu Yuan, in his "Heavenly Questions".

=== Shun in power ===
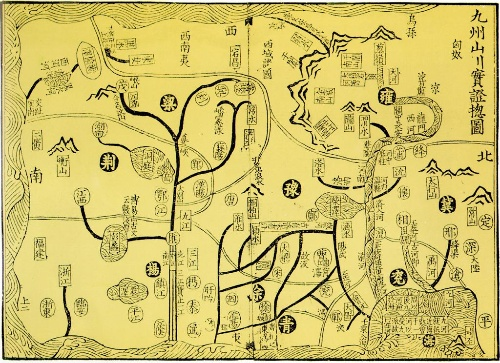
A depiction of the system of the zhou, or "islands" (now reinterpreted as "provinces"), a system which Shun is credited with developing as a tool to allow political administration of a territory with ongoing flooding making normal communications impossible, although the number and locations of zhou have varied over time

Even after nine years of the efforts of Gun, the flood continued to rage on, leading to the increase of all sorts of social disorders. The administration of the empire was becoming increasingly difficult; so, accordingly, at this point, Yao offered to resign the throne in favor of his special adviser(s), Four Mountains: however, Four Mountains declined, and instead recommended Shun – another distant relative to Yao through the Yellow Emperor; but one who was living in obscurity, despite his royal lineage.

Yao proceeded to put Shun through a series of tests, beginning with marrying his two daughters to Shun and ending by sending him down from the mountains to the plains below where Shun had to face fierce winds, thunder, and rain. After passing all of Yao's tests, not the least of which being establishing and continuing a state of marital harmony together with Yao's two daughters, Shun took on administrative responsibilities as co-emperor. Among these responsibilities, Shun had to deal with the Great Flood and its associated disruptions, especially in light of the fact that Yao's reluctant decision to appoint Gun to handle the problem had failed to fix the situation, despite having been working on it for the previous nine years. Shun took steps over the next four years to reorganize the empire, in such a way as to solve immediate problems and to put the imperial authority in a better position to deal with the flood and its effects.

Although Shun's organization (or reorganization) of the flooded and increasingly flooded lands into zhou or islands (the political ancestors of the modern zhou or provinces, both of which may be written with the same character, 州) alleviated some of the administrative difficulties, the fact remained that despite the additional four years of effort, Gun still had not only failed to achieve any success towards solving the main problem of the ongoing flooding, but the water even kept on rising. Gun insisted on staying the course with the dikes, insisting that despite the overwhelming failure so far that the people work even harder and to continue to build more and higher. Not only that, but Gun questioned the legitimacy of Shun as a ruler due to his modest background.

=== Acts of Shun ===
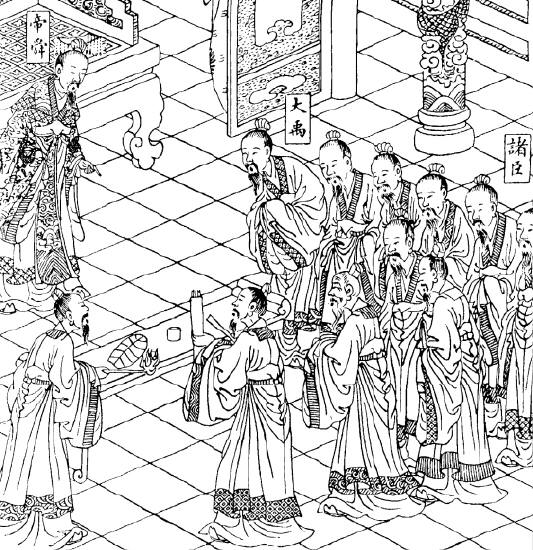
Emperor Shun performs divination in the palace, with Yu present

After the solemnities of his final accession to power, the first thing Shun did was to reform the calendar. Next, for the period of a month, Shun convoked a series of meetings, ceremonies, and interviews at the imperial capital with the Four Mountains and the heads, lords, or princes of the realm's houses, clans, surnames, tribes, and nations.

Shun then went to Mount Tai as the beginning of his tour of inspection of the flood-ravaged realm. Here, at Taishan, he met with the princes of the eastern regions; and, after certain religious ceremonies, he standardized weights, measures, and ritual. Then he went on to do the same to the south, the west, and the north, meeting at the sacred mountains of each region with the princes and leaders of each region, and standardizing their rules, measures, and practices. All of these acts can be seen as preparatory to the fighting of the flood, as this was an effort requiring extraordinary levels of synchronized and coordinated activity over a relatively large territory: the timing was synchronized through the calendar reform and the engineering measures were made possible by standardizing the weights and measures.

Towards the end of the year, Shun returned to the imperial seat, and after a sacrificial offering of a bullock at his ancestral temple, he then put into action the plan that he had developed during his working tour of inspection. One of these was to divide the empire into twelve administrative units (zhou), each one administered from the highest mountain within that area. This was doubtlessly a useful expedient in the face of the rising and unpredictable flood waters. Another of Shun's acts was administrative reform.

=== Gun's demise ===
With Gun's overwhelming failure to control the flood waters and his questioning of the legitimacy of Shun's rule, he became labeled as an intransigent. Accordingly, as part of his administrative reforms, Shun had Gun banished to Feather Mountain. Accounts vary considerably about the details of Gun's demise; but, in any case, the sources seem to agree that he met the end of his human existence at Feather Mountain (although again accounts vary as to whether this end was death, through execution by Zhurong, or through a metamorphic transformation into — depending on account — a yellow bear, a three-footed tortoise, or a yellow dragon.)

=== Gun's son Yu ===
Somehow, Gun had a son, Yu (大禹). Various myths suggest that this occurred under circumstances that would not meet the normal criteria for historical fact. Yu would continue the struggle to contain the flood waters.

=== Great Yu controls the flood ===
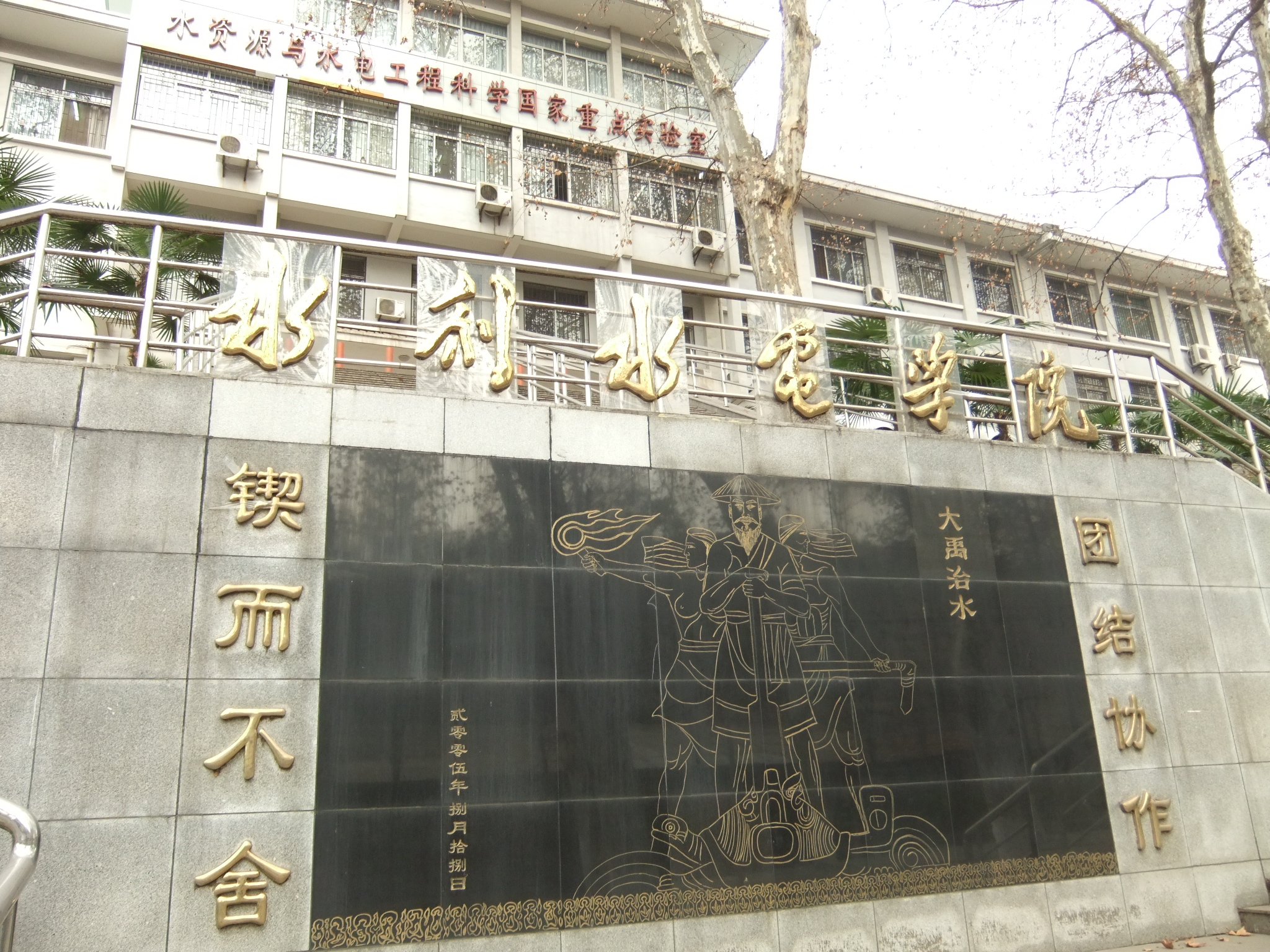
Yu the Great and his human and chelonian associates, fighting the flood. Relief outside the Water Resources and Hydro Power Lab, Wuhan University (2005)

Yu tried a different approach to the project of flood control; which in the end having achieved success, earned Yu renown throughout Chinese history, in which the Gun-Yu Great Flood is commonly referred to as "Great Yu Controls the Waters" (Chinese: 大禹治水; pinyin: Dà Yǔ Zhìshuǐ). Yu's approach seems to have involved an approach more oriented toward drainage and less towards containment with dams and dikes. According to the more fancily embellished versions of the story it was also necessary for him to subdue various supernatural beings as well as recruit the assistance of others, for instance a channel-digging dragon and a giant mud-hauling tortoise (or turtle).

洪水滔天，浩浩懷山襄陵，下民昏墊。予乘四載，隨山刊木，暨益奏庶鮮食。予決九川，距四海，濬畎澮距川。

— Yu the Great, quoted according to tradition, describing his work in regard to the flood: Book of Documents, ch. "Yi and Ji" 益稷
Translation:

The inundating waters seemed to assail the heavens, and in their extent embraced the hills and overtopped the great mounds, so that the people were bewildered and I opened passages for the streams throughout the nine provinces and conducted them to the seas. I deepened the channels and conducted them to the streams.

— Cotterell & Cotterell 1975, p. 24.

=== Yu's helpers ===
Various myths, or versions of myths, specify that Yu received help from various sources which helped him to succeed in controlling the Great Flood. Hebo, the god of the Yellow River is supposed to have provided Yu with a map of the river and its surroundings which helped him make his plans. Alternatively, the Yellow River map is said to have been provided to Yu by Houtu.

=== Aftermath ===
After his work in controlling the flood waters, Yu became sole respected emperor and went on to found the Xia dynasty, when his son Qi of Xia succeeded him, thus establishing the beginning of a tradition of dynastic succession through primogeniture. But, before this, after ending his work against the flooding, Yu was said to have assembled all of the heroes/gods involved in fighting the flood together on Mount Guiji (in modern Zhejiang) at a certain time; but, when Fangfeng arrived late Yu had him executed — later it turned out that Fangfeng was late because he had stopped to fight a local flood which he encountered on his way.

== Acquisition of agricultural civilization ==
Besides the motif of controlling the flood waters another motif is particularly characteristic of the Chinese Gun Yu flood myth, namely the acquisition of the agricultural civilization. In some versions, this includes the appointment of Ji Qi (later called Houji) as Minister of Agriculture. Other versions go into the details of how a tiny remnant of people consisting of only two or a few individuals managed to survive the flood and the re-population/civilization process following the worldwide disaster, and/or how grain seeds or fire were obtained. Another figure in this regard is Yi, also known as Boyi or Bo Yi.

== Historicity ==
The narrative of the Great Flood of prehistoric China may provide some insight into social development during this era. David Hawkes comments on the way that the various versions of the Gun-Yu story seem to contrast the relative success or failure, or at least the differences, between Gun, the father, and his son, Yu. Hawkes proposes a symbolic interpretation of a societal transition. In this case, Gun represents a society at an earlier technological stage, which engages in small scale agriculture which involves raising areas of arable land sufficiently above the level of the marshes existing then in the flood plains of the Yellow River system, including tributaries: from this perspective the "magically-expanding" xirang soil can be understood as representing a type of floating garden, made up of soil, brushwood, and similar materials. Yu and his work in controlling the flood would symbolize a later type of society, a one which possessed of technological innovations allowing a much larger scale approach to transforming wetlands to arable fields. Hawkes explains the miraculous transformations of the landscape which appear in the mythological descriptions as symbolically representative of a gridded drainage system engineered to permanently eliminate entire marsh areas, in favor of agriculturally exploitable fields.

=== Identification ===
Archaeological evidence of an outburst flood at Jishi Gorge on the Yellow River, comparable to similar severe events in the world in the past 10,000 years, has been dated to about 1920 BCE (a few centuries later than the traditional beginning of the Xia dynasty which came after Emperors Shun and Yao), and is suggested to have been the basis for the myth. A colossal landslide created a natural dam across the river which was breached about a year later. The resulting flood could plausibly have travelled 2,000 km (1,200 mi) down the river and the resulting instability of river channels might have lasted up to twenty years. About this time, the Neolithic gave way to the Bronze Age in the Yellow River valley. The authors suggest that this coincided with the beginning of the Xia, several centuries later than traditionally thought, and that the Erlitou culture is an archaeological manifestation of the Xia dynasty. However, this identification has been hotly contested by academics. For one, the size and scale of the flood does not match the descriptions given in the classics, and the date contradicts Xia dynasty chronology. Furthermore, the ruins destroyed during the flood had already crumbled 2,000 years prior to the Jishi Gorge outburst, which means there was no civilisation to experience the flood in that area.

=== Dating ===
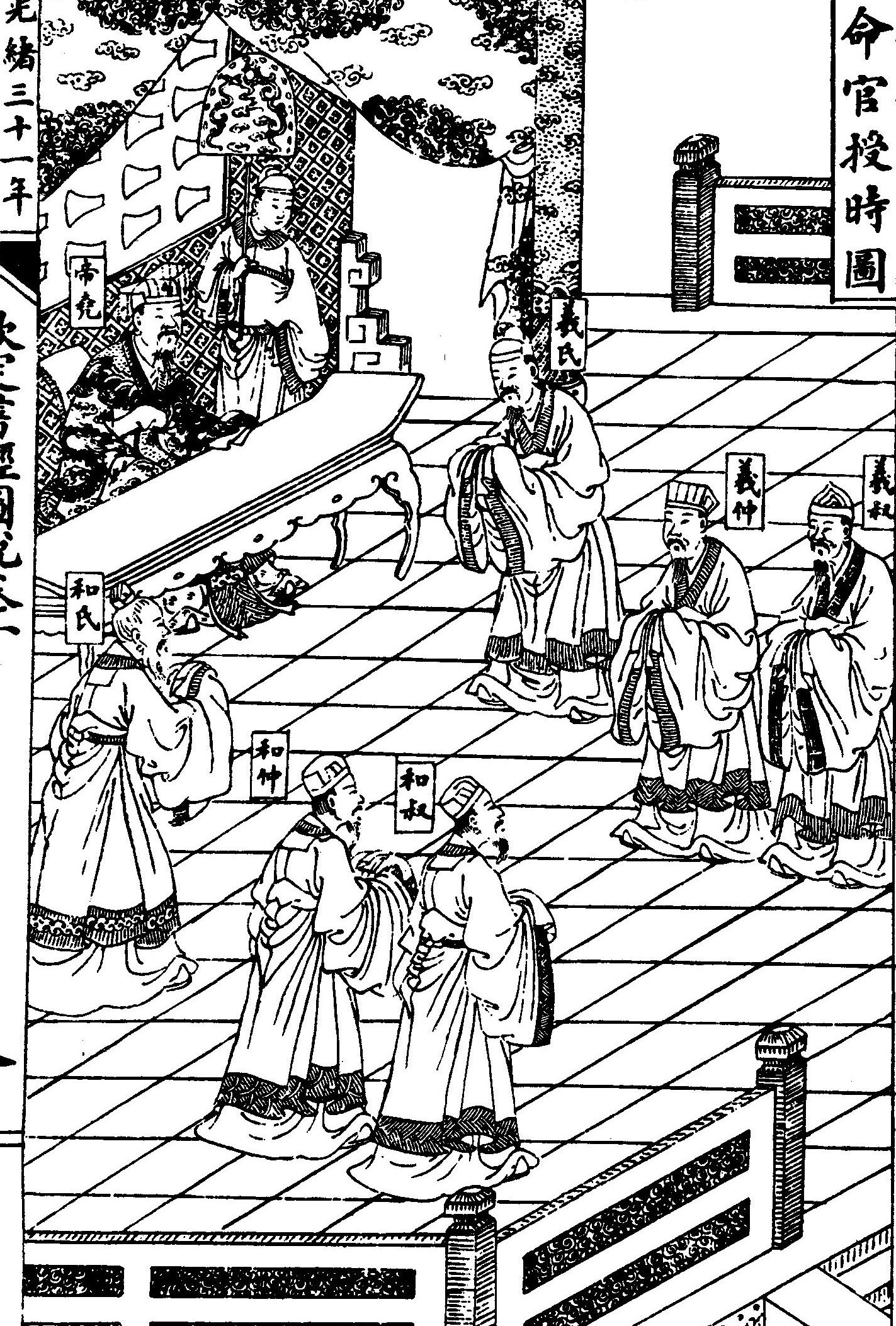
The Xihe brothers receive orders from emperor Yao to organise the calendar

The historian K. C. Wu believes that the "Canon of Yao" ("yaodian") in the Book of History (Shujing) has historical value, despite being one of the "second batch" or "new" texts comprising this collection of documents, which despite the problematic nature of their textual transmission, and that they appear to be reconstructed or heavily edited and interpolated, as compared with the "first" or "old" batch, which supposedly survived the Fires of Qin (the burning of books and burying of scholars together with the destruction by fire of the Qin imperial library at the collapse of its dynasty). The first batch documents allegedly remained hidden for about a century, until accidentally discovered and handed over to a descendant of Confucius. Wu accepts that the "yaodian" is not a direct copy of the original, however he argues that it was based on the same, authentic sources as the first batch documents, perhaps even being to some extent based on the actual original. However, the clinching factor which K. C. Wu claims is objective, extra-textual confirmation of "Yao's Canon" (and by implication, the rest of the second batch documents) has directly to do with dating the Great Flood, specifically to around the year 2200 BCE. This is based on comparing astronomical data from the text with modern astronomical or astrophysical analysis.

At the beginning of his reign, Yao was supposed to have appointed four ministerial officials (two sets of two brothers) to make the necessary astronomical observations for a reformed calendar. Each of these individuals were sent to the limits of the royal territory, one in each of the cardinal directions, where they were supposed to observe certain stars at sunset on each of the solstices and equinoxes, so the results could then be compared, and the calendar accordingly adjusted. K. C. Wu cites references from two modern astronomers that largely confirm a date of around 2200 for Yao's reign, which is in accord with traditional, accepted dating.

In view of Yao and his reign, this evidence for accurate astronomical observations could be interpreted as an intrusion of archeoastronomy into the realm of mythology; in other words, ancient astronomical observations have been incorporated with mythological material, or the other way around.

== See also ==
- 2350 BCE Middle East anomaly
- 4.2 kiloyear event (in 2200 BCE)
- Agriculture (Chinese mythology)
- Chinese emperors family tree (ancient)
- Chinese mythology
- Classic of History
- Emperor Yao
- Flood myth
- Gong Gong
- Great flood and procreation
- Gun (Chinese mythology)
- History of Agriculture#China
- Houji
- Mulberry fields (idiom)
- Nine Provinces (China)
- Nüwa Mends the Heavens
- Qin dynasty
- Shun (Chinese leader)
- Sinking city myth (Chinese)
- Three Sovereigns and Five Emperors
- Xia dynasty
- Yangzi
- Yellow River
- Yu the Great
- Xia–Shang–Zhou Chronology Project

== Sources ==
- Christie, Anthony (1968), Chinese mythology, London: Hamlyn, ISBN 978-0600006374.
- Birrell, Anne (1999), Chinese mythology: an introduction, Johns Hopkins University Press, ISBN 978-0801861833.
- Cotterell, Yong Yap; Cotterell, Arthur (1975), The Early Civilization of China, G.P.Putnam's Sons, ISBN 978-0-399-11595-0
- Feng, Li (2013), Early China: a social and cultural history, Cambridge University Press, ISBN 9780521895521.
- Hawkes, David (1985), The songs of the south : an ancient Chinese anthology of poems by Qu Yuan and other poets, Penguin Books, ISBN 9780140443752.
- Strassberg, Richard, ed. (2002), A Chinese bestiary : strange creatures from the guideways through mountains and seas, University of California Press, ISBN 978-0520218444.
- Wu, Kuo-Cheng (1982), The Chinese heritage, New York: Crown Publishers, Inc, ISBN 978-0517544754.
- Wu, Qinglong; Zhao, Zhijun; Liu, Li; Granger, Darryl E.; Wang, Hui; Cohen, David J.; Wu, Xiaohong; Ye, Maolin; Bar-Yosef, Ofer; Lu, Bin; Zhang, Jin; Zhang, Peizhen; Yuan, Daoyang; Qi, Wuyun; Cai, Linhai; Bai, Shibiao (5 Aug 2016), "Outburst flood at 1920 BCE supports historicity of China's Great Flood and the Xia dynasty", Science, 353 (6299): 579–582, Bibcode:2016Sci...353..579W, doi:10.1126/science.aaf0842, PMID 27493183, S2CID 206646492.
- Wu, Qinglong; Zhao, Zhijun; Liu, Li; Granger, Darryl E.; Wang, Hui; Cohen, David J.; Wu, Xiaohong; Ye, Maolin; Bar-Yosef, Ofer; Lu, Bin; Zhang, Jin; Zhang, Peizhen; Yuan, Daoyang; Qi, Wuyun; Cai, Linhai; Bai, Shibiao (31 March 2017), "Response to Comments on "Outburst flood at 1920 BCE supports historicity of China's Great Flood and the Xia dynasty"", Science, 355 (6332): 579–582, Bibcode:2017Sci...355R1382W, doi:10.1126/science.aal1325, PMID 28360294, S2CID 206654344.
- Yang, Lihui; An, Deming; Turner, Jessica Anderson (2005), Handbook of Chinese mythology, Santa Barbara: ABC-Clio, ISBN 9780195332636.
