= Mulberry fields =

Chinese idiom

Chinese name
- Traditional Chinese: 滄海桑田 桑田滄海 滄桑
- Simplified Chinese: 沧海桑田 桑田沧海 沧桑
- Literal meaning: the vast sea (turned into) mulberry fields
Transcriptions
Standard Mandarin
- Hanyu Pinyin: cānghǎisāngtián sāngtiáncānghǎi cāngsāng
Yue: Cantonese
- Jyutping: cong1 hoi2 song1 tin4 song1 tin4 cong1 hoi2 cong1 song1

Vietnamese name
- Vietnamese: bãi bể nương dâu bể dâu thương hải tang điền tang thương tang hải
- Hán-Nôm: 𡓁𣷭埌橷 𣷭橷
- Chữ Hán: 滄海桑田 桑滄 桑海

Korean name
- Hangul: 창해상전 상전벽해
- Hanja: 滄海桑田 桑田碧海
Transcriptions
- Revised Romanization: changhaesangjeon sangjeonbyeokhae

Japanese name
- Kanji: 滄海桑田 桑田滄海 桑田碧海
Transcriptions
- Romanization: sōkaisōden sōdensōkai sōdenhekikai

In China, at least since the middle of Tang dynasty, the phrase mulberry fields is a metonymy for the land which was or will be covered by oceans. (Note: Joseph Needham, as cited by Robert F. Campany, said that this subject gave a notion of the Taoist belief, that "over vast eras", geological change will turn the ocean into land and vice versa.) This term is often used in Chinese literature and poetry, for example in Zuo Zhuan, which is about the death of Duke Jing of Jin and mentions the "Shaman of Mulberry Fields" (Chinese: 桑田巫; pinyin: sāngtián wū). (Note: In this case, sāngtián can be a name or a place.) Along with the "blue seas" phrase, since the Han dynasty, these two phrases were combined into an idiom that has meaning about changes and changing.

The mathematics book shushù jìyí 数术记遗 (shushù jìyí) by Xu Yue, from the Han dynasty, mentioned an idea about the turning of blue seas into mulberry fields. Yan Zhenqing, in his literature Magu Shan Xiantan Ji (痲姑山仙墰記), wrote that on the high tops of Mount Magu there could still be found clam and oyster shells, and he also mentioned the gardens and fields which once were under the water.

== The blue sea turned into mulberry fields ==
"The blue sea turned into mulberry fields" (traditional Chinese: 滄海桑田; simplified Chinese: 沧海桑田; pinyin: cānghǎi-sāngtián; fig. "the transformations of the world") appears in the hagiographic works of Ge Hong, i.e., "Shenxian zhuan". The idiom is given in four characters, each having its own meaning: 沧 "blue, dark green; cold"; 海 "sea, ocean; maritime"; 桑 "mulberry tree; surname"; 田 "field, arable land, cultivated". This idiom can also be interpreted as "time will bring a great change into the world" or "everything will be change in time".

When the immortal Wang Yuan invited Magu to come to his house for a feast, after the food was being served, Magu said:

Since I became an immortal, I have seen the Eastern Sea turn to mulberry fields three times. As one across to Penglai, the water only his waist-depth. I wonder whether it will turn into a dry land once again.

Wang drew a long breath and said:

O, all the sages say that Eastern Sea once again will become blowing dust.

== Blue seas where once was mulberry fields ==
"Blue seas where once was mulberry fields" (Chinese: 渤澥桑田; pinyin: bóxièsāngtián) was written on the Records of the Grand Historian by Sima Qian. The idiom can be interpreted as "the time will bring great changing" or "the wheel of fate is spinning". Each characters of the idiom has a meaning: 渤 "swelling; the gulf of Hebei"; 澥 "gulf"; 桑 "mulberry tree; surname"; 田 "field, arable land, cultivated".

== Literary works ==
Chunhyangjeon is a popular romance story from Korea that tells of a beautiful peasant girl named Choon Hyang, who was proposed to by a noble young man named Yi Doryung. Wolmai, Choon Hyang's mother, agreed, as long as Yi Doryung was willing to give a marriage letter secretly to them and promise to never leave her daughter. (Note: In Korean tradition, marriage between a noble and a commoner can't be held formally.) Yi Doryung wrote this letter:

Blue seas may be turn into mulberry fields, and mulberry fields may be turn into blue seas but my heart for Choon Hyang will never be changed. The heaven and earth with all the gods become the witnesses.

At the end of the Qing Dynasty, Prince Chun (1840–1891) lamented the destruction of Mingheyuan Garden (traditional Chinese: 鳴鶴園; simplified Chinese: 鸣鹤园; pinyin: mínghèyuán; lit. "Singing Crane Garden") by Taiping Rebellion. He wrote a sentence:

White mulberries swallowed by darkest seas, and are you not lamenting?

One of the most popular poems in Vietnam, the Tale of Kieu, has a line in the opening of the poem that refers to a great upheaval in the realm of humans. Vietnamese uses a native phrase bể dâu (shorting of bãi bể nương dâu) which is a calque of the Chinese term, 滄海桑田 cānghǎisāngtián. Bể meaning sea or ocean, while dâu meaning mulberries.

Trải qua một cuộc bể dâu
𣦰戈𠬠局𣷭橷
How many harrowing events have occurred while mulberries cover the conquered sea!

— Nguyễn Du, The Tale of Kieu

== See also ==
- Chinese flood myths
