= Xirang =

Magical substance in Chinese mythology

Xirang (Chinese: 息壤; pinyin: xírǎng) (Note: also known as hsi-jang, swelling earth, self-renewing soil, breathing earth, and living earth) was a magical soil in Chinese mythology with the ability to self-expand and grow continuously. Its properties made it particularly effective for use by Gun and Yu the Great in fighting the rising waters of the Great Flood.

== Etymology ==
This Chinese word compounds xí 息 "breathe; cease; rest; grow; multiply" and rǎng 壤 "soil; earth". Noting similarities with earth-diver creation myths, Anne Birrell translates xirang as "self-renewing soil", and compares other translations of "breathing earth" (Wolfram Eberhard), "swelling mold" (Derk Bodde), "idle soil" (Roger Greatrex), and "living earth" or "breathing earth" (Rémi Mathieu).

== Mythology ==
In some versions of the myths, Gun stole the xirang from the Shangdi, who sent the deity Zhu Rong to execute him in punishment, on Feather Mountain. According to some accounts, Yu, on the other hand, went up to Heaven. After begging Shangdi, he received from him a gift of as much xirang as his magical black tortoise could carry on its back, thus allowing Yu to successfully block up the 233,559 springs, the sources of the flood waters. In other versions of these myths, xirang was stolen or obtained from the Primordial Divinity, or Gun's executioner was other than Zhu Rong.

== Historical basis ==
A historical basis has been suggested for both the Great Flood and for xirang. Sinologist David Hawkes proposes that the myths are a symbolic interpretation of a societal transition. In this case, Gun represents a society at an earlier technological stage, which engages in small-scale agriculture which involves raising areas of arable land sufficiently above the level of the marshes. The "magically-expanding" xirang soil may represent a type of friable raised garden, made up of soil, brushwood, and similar materials. Yu and his work in controlling the flood would symbolize a later type of society, which allowed a much larger scale approach to transforming wetlands to arable fields.

A less mythical explanation could be sought in various forms of expansive clay. Generally impervious to water, clays are useful in creating the core of earthen dams. Expansive clays, in particular, slowly expand when wetted, thus matching the "swelling" translation. When dried, they take on a puffy "popcorn" look, which could be interpreted as "breathing" or airy. Such clays are abundant in the Shaanxi Province where many of these events are thought to have occurred.

== Comparative mythology ==
The xirang mythology has parallels to the mythologies of the indigenous peoples of the Americas, particularly the earth-diver creation myth. In the earth-diver myth, the world is covered by primordial waters until a certain creature dives down into them (after overcoming great perils) and retrieves a small bit of magical soil, which subsequently expands into the land areas of today.

== See also ==
- Chinese mythology
