= Sinking city myth =

Flood myth in Chinese folklore

The sinking city myth is one of the great flood themes in Chinese folklore. It is a flood myth with three specific characteristics: one or two survivors, a statue that weeps blood, and the sinking of an entire city along with its citizens. The survivor(s) are saved by the gods because of their benevolent acts; the survivors may include an old lady or a devoted son. The statue that weeps blood is often a stone lion statue, or sometimes a tortoise statue.

There are several different versions of the sinking city myth.

This theme is often confused with another flood theme in which the sunken area is greatly increased, from a city to the whole world.

== Records of Searching for Spirits ==
Records of Searching for Spirits (Chinese: 搜神記; pinyin: Sōushénjì) is a collection of stories from the 4th century CE which was compiled by Gan Bao from the East Jin Dynasty. This literature contains two versions of the legend of the sunken city, in Chapters 13 and 20. The story from Chapter 20 tells of a benevolent old woman who is told that her city would be sunk after the eyes of the tortoise statue in her city turned red. Every day she checked its eyes, until one day a naughty child colored the eyes red. The old woman, with the help of a dragon, escaped the city just before the city sank beneath the water and become a lake.

== Buddhist version ==
This version of the myth takes place during a dark time, when most people did not believe in Buddha and the gods anymore. Ksitigarbha Bodhisattva turned himself into a beggar to find the last pious person. He found an old lady praying to the gods who gave him half of the rice which was intended for offering. The Bodhisattva told the lady that her hometown would be sunk after the lion statue's eyes in her city turned red. She passed the warning to other citizens but was laughed at. They secretly painted the statue's eyes red as a prank for the old lady, who was shocked and once again warned the citizens. The people of the city laughed at her and, realising that she could not convince them, the old woman climbed a nearby mountain. After she reached the top, she turned her head just to find her whole city had sunk under the water, and she wept bitterly.

== Nanyang (1982) ==
In 1982, the people from Nanyang, Henan still recall the legend of a brother and sister who frequently played with an iron lion statue in the front of a temple. One day, a monk told the older sister to give the lion a steamed bun every day and warned her to check its eyes. If the eyes turned red, she and her brother were to climb into the lion's belly. One day the sister found the statue's eyes red. She called her little brother and they both climbed into the lion's belly not long before the sky turned dark and the wind blew hard. After the sky was clear, they climbed out and found that "the sky had fallen" while everyone in the village had died. They brought with them the steamed buns from inside the lion's belly and searched for other survivors until they found an old woman on the top of the mountain. Both brother and sister asked the old woman what they should do next; the old woman advised that each of them should roll a part of a millstone from the top of the mountain. If the two millstone pieces landed on top of each other as they should, the sister and brother should marry and repopulate the world; and the result was so. They had five pairs of male and female children; each pair were married and they repopulated the world with human beings once more.

== Culture ==
- Gùshi shíshī yǎn hóng 紅眼石獅故事 ("When the Lion's Eyes Turn Red") was a drama dance by "New Tang Dynasty Performing Arts Center" (choreography by Tia Zhang) to celebrate Chinese New Year in 2006, about a benevolent old lady and Guan Yin.

== See also ==
- Chinese mythology
