= Namu doryeong =

Korean orally transmitted folktale

Namu doryeong (Korean: 나무도령Master Tree) is a Korean orally transmitted folktale that tells the story of the son of a tree and a seonnyeo (fairy). While riding on his father, the tree, during a great flood, the boy rescues disaster-stricken animals, marries the daughter of an old woman and becomes the progenitor of humanity. The pattern of a boy with an earthly father and heavenly mother ("地父天母") founding a new human race after the previous one is wiped out in a flood lends Namu doryeong the characteristics of a human foundation myth.

== History and transmission ==
Namu doryeong is one of a number of flood fables and human foundation myths found across the world. Stories of the single survivor of a great flood going on to found a new human race were told in various guises in a number of civilizations worldwide, from the Sumerian tale of Ziusudra to those of Deucalion and Pyrrha in Greek mythology, Noah in the Bible, or Manu in India. The latter story is recorded in the Shatapatha Brahmana, an Indian text dating from the sixth century BCE, and tells how Manu saves a fish from death, finds a boat and survives the flood. The Chinese Buddhist text Yukdo jipgyeong (六度集經 Sutra on the Collection of the Six Perfections), too, contains a similar story. Namu doryeong appears throughout Korea, with versions recorded in at least 15 oral folktale sourcebooks including Hanguk gubi munhak daegye (한국구비문학대계 Outlines of Korean Oral Literature]. While Mok doryeong-gwa daehongsu (목도령과 대홍수 Master Tree and the Great Flood], the version recorded by Son Jin-tae during the Japanese colonial period, contains strongly mythical characteristics, subsequently recorded versions are characterized by more prominent folktale-style elements.

== Plot ==
=== (1) Basic plot ===
Once, long ago, a fairy came down to earth from the sky and sat down to rest in the shade of a tree. She became intimate with the tree, and gave birth to a son. When he had grown up, the fairy returned to the sky. The boy would play with the tree and call it his father, so they named him Namu Doryeong. One day, the tree told the boy that if ever he were to fall down in heavy rain, the boy must climb onto him and ride him. Just as his father had said, a huge flood came and covered the world in water. Namu Doryeong quickly climbed onto his fallen father. While he was floating along, he met some ants, then a mosquito, pleading to be rescued. With his father's permission, he saved them all. Finally, he came across a boy begging to be saved. Namu Doryeong wanted to save the boy, too, but his father refused. Nonetheless, Namu Doryeong disobeyed his father and rescued the boy.

The rain stopped and the group came to a house on the highest peak. There lived an old woman with her daughter and a slave girl. The old woman was looking for partners for her daughter and the slave girl. In an attempt to win the daughter for himself, the boy saved by Namu Doryeong claimed that Namu Doryeong could pick out grains of millet scattered on a bed of sand. When the old woman asked to see Namu Doryeong's skill for herself, Namu Doryeong found himself in a tight spot. Just then, the ants came and gathered the scattered millet. The old woman put her daughter in the room on the east side of the house and the slave girl in the room on the west side, telling Namu Doryeong and the rescued boy to choose their wives by themselves. Just then, the mosquito came and told Namu Doryeong where the woman's daughter was. Namu Doryeong married the daughter and the boy married the slave girl. Because the flood had wiped out everyone else on earth, they bore a new human race.

=== (2) Variations ===
Alternative versions of this story hold that Namu Doryeong was the son of a childless widow or unmarried woman who had intercourse with the spirit of the tree and bore a son. In some versions, the story of Namu Doryeong's birth is omitted altogether. This omission has served to rationalize the story, given that the birth of a person to a tree is hard to accept in terms of human experience. There are also variations in terms of the animals that help Namu Doryeong. In some versions, not just ants and mosquitos but bees, mayflies, snakes, swallows, roe deer and wild boar make appearances. In others, the boy rescued by Namu Doryeong does not feature at all. Sometimes, he is introduced as a man who comes to the old woman's house once the flood has receded.

== Features and significance ==
Namu doryeong shows the character of a myth in that it describes the origins of humanity. Unlike in the West, where floods are due to divine wrath, the reason for the inundation in Namu doryeong is unclear. Namu Toryeong is of holy descent, having been born to a fairy and a tree spirit. His mother returns to heaven after giving birth to him, and he is brought up by his father. This places him apart from heroes in other Korean legends, who have heavenly fathers and earthly mothers (天父地母). Furthermore, he is raised by a tree on earth. Namu Doryeong, the progenitor of the new human race, is thus an earth-oriented being. The boy who connives against Namu Doryeong also becomes the progenitor of a new race. This boy symbolizes the evil nature of human beings, while Namu Doryeong represents our good side. Their two conflicting natures show how both good and evil are innate in humans. Namu Doryeong's descendants will be good, while those of the boy will be bad. Because plants save life, while humans kill.

Some versions of the story omit the birth of Namu Doryeong and focus on how the animals repay his kindness to them. This indicates a change away from a legendary form based on a tree spirit to a folk tale form focusing on the gratitude of animals. Later on in Namu doryeong, the animals saved by the protagonist repay his kindness, while the boy betrays him. This reveals a perception of animals as good and humans as evil, while the strong implications of human betrayal show a deep-rooted folk tale logic. Moreover, Namu doryeong differs from most flood myths in that it does not end with marriage between a brother and sister who emerge as the sole survivors of the flood. This, too, indicates its transformation from a myth to a folk tale.

== Other ==
Namu Doryeong and the boy represent good and bad human nature, respectively. Korean creation myths also feature characters representing good and bad human nature, appearing together. Examples include Maitreya and Shakyamuni in Changsega (창세가 Song of Creation) and Daebyeorwang and Sobyeorwang in Cheonjiwang bonpuri (The Origins of Cheonjiwang).

== Bibliography ==
- Namu doryeong [나무도령 Master Tree], Hanguk gubi munhak daegye [한국구비문학대계 Outlines of Korean Oral Literature].
- https://gubi.aks.ac.kr/web/VolView2_html5.asp?datacode=03_15_FOT_20100217_HRS_SCS_0006
- Baegusan namu doryeong [백우산 나무도령, Master Tree of Mt. Baegusan], Hanguk gubi munhak daegye [한국구비문학대계 Outlines of Korean Oral Literature].
- https://gubi.aks.ac.kr/web/VolView2_html5.asp?datacode=03_15_FOT_20100113_HRS_KSJ_0002
