= Coxcox =

Character of Aztec mythology

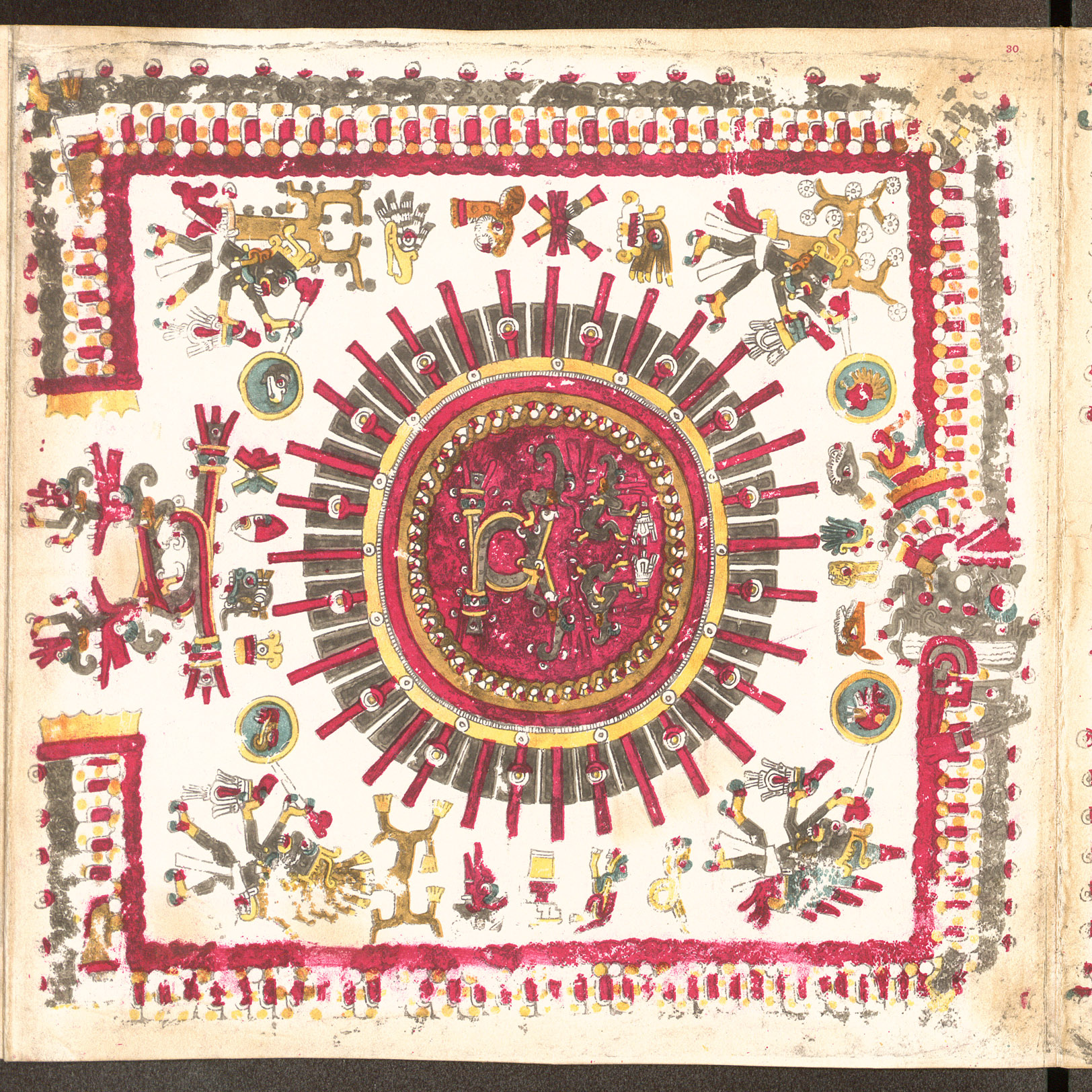
Page 30 of the Codex Borgia.

In Aztec mythology, Coxcox was the only male survivor of a worldwide flood, which was the fourth destruction of the world in Aztec myth.

The Aztecs believed that only Coxcox and his wife, Xochiquetzal, survived the flood. They took refuge in the hollow trunk of a cypress -or, in some versions, a small boat - which floated on top of the water and finally banked on a mountain in Culhuacan.

They had many children, but all of them were mute. The great spirit took pity on them, and sent a dove, which attempted to teach the children how to speak. Fifteen of them succeeded, and from these, the Aztecs believed, the Toltecs and Aztecs were descended.

== Another account ==
In another account, the Nahua god Tezcatlipoca spoke to a man named Nata and his wife Nana, saying: "Do not busy yourselves any longer making pulque, but hollow out for yourselves a large boat of an ahuehuete (cypress) tree, and make your home in it when you see the waters rising to the sky."

When flood waters came, the Earth disappeared and the highest mountain tops were covered in water. All other men perished, being transformed into fish.

== The legend in art ==
Ancient Aztec paintings often depict the boat floating on the flood waters beside a mountain. The heads of a man and a woman are shown in the air above the boat and a dove is also depicted. In its mouth the dove is carrying a hieroglyphic symbol representing the languages of the world, which it is distributing to the children of Coxcox.
