= East Sea (Chinese literature) =

Eastern boundary in ancient Chinese geography

The East Sea (simplified Chinese: 东海; traditional Chinese: 東海; pinyin: Dōng Hǎi), one of the Four Seas, is identified as the body of water east of the mainland according to ancient Chinese geography. In Chinese literature, the Four Seas are a metaphor for the boundaries of China. It contains modern day East China Sea as well as the Yellow Sea and Bohai Sea.

In Chinese mythology, East Sea is the domain of Ao Guang, the Donghai Longwang (東海龍王), or "the Dragon King of the Eastern Sea", who is responsible for controlling its storms and tides. Supposedly, the Dragon King resides in a large "Dragon Palace", the Donghai Longgong (東海龍宮), located at its bottom. In the Classic of Mountains and Seas（《山海经》）, the Dragon King of the East China Sea is the god of the rain department, but it maintains a greater special freedom, and human rainfall is completed by the dragon King of other rivers, lakes and Wells, and rarely needs the East Sea Dragon King to rain himself. The power of maritime jurisdiction is owned by the dragon King, and the Heavenly Court is generally autonomous. Ruling the sea of the East China Sea, dominating rain, thunder, floods, tides, tsunamis, etc. In China, the eastern Wei is respected, and according to the Zhouyi《周易》, the East is Yang, so it is natural that the Dragon King of the East China Sea ranks first.

== See also ==
- Dragon King
- Mulberry fields (idiom)
