= Great flood and procreation =

Theme in Chinese mythology

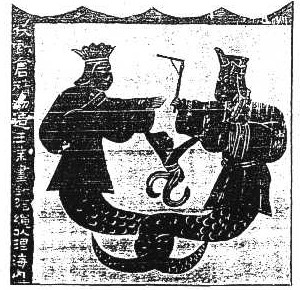
A mural of Nuwa and Fuxi from Han Dynasty.

The great flood and procreation theme, in which a flood almost wipes out the entire human race and a brother and sister pair up to repopulate the earth, is a recurring theme in Chinese flood myths. Chen Jianxian (1996) said that this theme was one of the more popular, and was still being told by more than 40 ethnic groups in China. There is a possibility that the myth is newer than other Chinese flood myths, because the oldest recorded sources about this myth are from the Six Dynasties, but the oral tradition may predate that period. The myth narrates incest between a brother and sister, and is often confused with the myth of Nüwa and Fuxi. The Shan-hai Ching describes the divine ancestors as a brother and sister who married each other to populate the earth with human beings. Another version pairs Pangu with his unnamed older sister as the main characters of this myth.

The theme has several variations, but the outline describes a great flood which destroyed all the humans all over the world except a brother and sister, or aunt and nephew. Both end up married in order to repopulate the world. One version states that their children were ordinary humans, while other say their child was a lump of meat, gourd, melon, or grindstone; after they opened, cut, or destroyed it, humans emerged.

== Thunder god's revenge ==
Chen Jianxian presumed the origin of this myth to be the Miao people. In this version, the story begin with dissent between the human ancestor, whose name varies, and the thunder god. One day, the human ancestor managed to confine the thunder god, but his children (sometimes named as Fuxi and Nüwa) released him out of pity. The thunder god gave them a seed of gourd or pumpkin or his own tooth, and told them that there would be a great flood. All the humans perished except the brother and sister, who hid themselves inside the gourd. To repopulate the earth, they married each other after receiving an "agreement sign from the heaven" (which is different depending on the source). Some versions say that the sister gave birth to a gourd; both cut the gourd into pieces and each pieces became the ancestors of different tribes, and so on. There are other versions, written below.

Once upon a time, a farmer was working in his field when he heard thunder. He took his children (Nüwa and Fuxi) inside their house, prepared an iron cage, and armed himself with a pitchfork. When the thunder god Lei Gong appeared with his thunder axe, the farmer stabbed him and locked him inside the cage. The farmer planned to kill the god and pickle him, and he went into the market to buy the spices after warning his children not to go near the god and gave him anything to eat or drink. Both children obeyed their father, until they pitied the thunder god, who asked them for food and water. After the children gave him a drop of water, his strength returned and he freed himself from the cage. He gave the frightened children his own tooth to be planted, which grew into a gourd plant. Lei Gong leapt into the sky and commanded the rain god to pour down water as heavy as he could.

When the farmer came into his house, the flood was already as high as his knees. He made a boat, put his children inside the magical gourd, and climbed into the boat. The water level continued to rise until it almost reach the heavens. The farmer knocked on heaven's gate and asked Taidi to stop the rain. Taidi realized what was about to happen and ordered the water god to get rid of the water at once. With the water gone, the boat fell from the sky and crashed into the ground along with the farmer, but his children inside the gourd was safe. After they climbed out of the gourd, both children realized that they were the only survivors of humankind and decided to marry and repopulated the earth.

Another version names the survivor boy as A Zie. After the flood, he planned to marry his older sister to in order to repopulate the earth, but was rejected because she was hesitant to violate the incest taboo. After reasoning with her, she agreed to accept his marriage proposal with a condition: they should both go up to the top of opposite hills, taking with them each a part of a millstone, and roll the millstone down into the valley in the middle. If both parts of the millstones managed to perfectly collide straight into each other, she would marry her younger brother. A Zie, realising that his sister's condition was almost impossible to meet, prepared already collided millstones in the bottom of the valley without her knowledge before they climbed on the hills and rolled their millstones, making it appear as if he won. But his sister did not expect this and was still reluctant. She proposed another condition, which was the same as the first, but the objects they carried would be different. He carried a knife and she carried its sheath; she would marry her younger brother only if the knife was inserted into the sheath. A Zie made the same trick by setting up a duplicate knife and sheath in advance. After this, she agreed to the marriage and they consummated. She conceived and bore her younger brother's first child, which was a lump of meat without arms and legs. The maddened A Zie cut off their offspring into pieces and scattered it to the rest of the hill. The next morning the pieces of the meat became both male and female humans, making A Zie and his older sister the progenitors of the humans that lived after the flood.

There is another version which stated that the brother could not meet his sister's condition and so both of them were not married. They created living humans from clay. While they dried the clay dolls under the sun, the rain was pouring and the couple tried to save their creations. Unfortunately, some of the dolls lost their arms, legs, eyes, and so forth, explaining why some people are disabled.

== Human ancestor marries heavenly maiden ==
The theme is spread among the Nakhi and Yi people. There were some brothers who worked at their field, but their work was undone the next morning; this happened for several days. The brothers found out that every night their field was being spoiled by a boar. They all planned to kill the boar except one, and for his benevolence, the boar which was actually a god told him that there would be a great and devastating flood on its way. The youth climbed into a leather-covered drum or wooden box, which was carried into the heaven by the ever-rising water level. In heaven, he met a heavenly maiden and fell in love with her. He had to pass a series of tests before they were able to be married, while their offspring became the ancestors of the Tibetan, Nakhis, and Bais.

The last version is a mixture of different myths. There were two brothers and one sister who hoed the field, which was vandalized by a god. The god later told them of the coming great flood; he told the younger brother and sister to go aboard a giant gourd, while the older ill-tempered brother was told to go into a stone boat. The brother and sister inside the giant gourd were saved. The brother married his older sister, and they had a boy who eventually married a heavenly maiden.

== See also ==
- Chinese flood myths
- Chinese mythology
- Flood myth
- Great flood of Gun-Yu
- Nüwa Mends the Heavens
