= Robert E. Howard bibliography (poems P–Z) =

Bibliography

A list of poems by Robert E. Howard (1906–1936), an American writer and poet in early 20th-century Texas. His love of poetry came from being read to by his mother at a young age. However, his attempts to make a living by poetry were unsuccessful and he is today most remembered for his short stories and fiction. Nevertheless, Howard wrote hundreds of poems; many were published within his lifetime and the others published after his 1936 suicide.

== Key ==
Title	Lines	Opening line	Place of publication	Publication date	Alternative title(s)	Source text	Notes	References
The title of the poem	#	The text of the first known line in the poem	The book or magazine in which the poem was first published	The date on which the poem was first published	Any alternative titles by which the poem is also known	Links to online texts where available	Further information about the poem	Bibliographic sources
An alternative title for the poem					The main title of the poem			

The lack of information in a column does not necessarily mean that the information does not exist, only that verifiable information is not currently available. For example, the lack of publication information does not necessarily mean that a poem has not been published to date, nor does the lack of a definite note about the public domain indicate that a poem is still under copyright.

This table may be sorted by different columns by clicking on the icon in the appropriate column. Clicking the icon again will alternate between ascending and descending order.

Additional notes

Title/Alternative title: Some poems are known by multiple titles. Alternative titles are shown in the column of the same name. Every effort has been made to list full information at all entries for each title, to save the user time in scrolling. Occasionally, alternative titles appear consecutively, in which case the second entry will follow without additional information, shown in a darker gray on the table. In other cases, some poems were not titled by Howard or the original title has not survived. Some poems have been given tentative titles after Howard's death; this is indicated in the Notes column. Where multiple titles exist, they have been listed alphabetically by their various designations following the word "Untitled." Some pieces of poetry were used by Howard as epigraphs within his stories. Lord (1976) listed these poems under the title of the short story rather than the title of the poem itself, so the poems are listed under those titles as well. With epigraphs, the first publication information given in this table is that of the poem's first printing separated from the story.

Lines: The number of lines in the poem.

Source text: Links given in the Source Text column are to copies of the poem in online libraries (where available). For ease of browsing the table, these links are preceded by a small icon. For example, for poems on Wikisource.

References: Bibliographic references are given in the final column of each row. The exception to this is the Notes column; as notes may come from diverse sources, or from a separate part of one of the main sources, each individual note is followed by its own reference.

== Poetry ==
Title	Lines	Opening line	Place of publication	Publication date	Alternative title(s)	Source text	Notes	References
Palace of Bast, The	23	She sits all day on an ebon couch	Chacal #2	Spring 1977	Palace of Bast			Lord 1976, p. 308; Herman 2006, p. 192
Palm-trees are waving in the Gulf breeze	putatively 36 lines, when divided into couplets, but some lines and stanzas are written across the page like prose	Palm-trees are waving in the Gulf breeze	Austin, vol. 3, no. 1	May 1992	Untitled: Palm-trees are waving in the Gulf breeze		Letter:^{K} Tevis Clyde Smith, September 7, 1924 (Herman 2006, p. 229); Distributed as part of REHUPA #115 (Herman 2006, p. 229)	Herman 2006, p. 229
Parody	20	What is so vile as a February day?	Always Comes Evening (Underwood-Miller edition)	1977	February		The oldest known Howard poem, written January 28, 1921 at Cross Plains Highschool; Tentative title^{B} (Lord 1976, p. 304); A parody of the famous passage that begins "And what is so rare as a day in June?" from James Russell Lowell's THE VISION OF SIR LAUNFAL (Lord 1976, p. 304); An early work^{C} (Lord 1976, p. 304)	Lord 1976, p. 304; Herman 2006, p. 168
The Parrot	20	When the king and his folk lay dead	A Means to Freedom: The Letters of H. P. Lovecraft and Robert E. Howard	ca. July 1934			Mnemonic reconstruction^{V} of the Alfred Noyes poem of the same name;Letter:^{K} H. P. Lovecraft; NOT INCLUDED IN COLLECTED POETRY	p. 769-770
Passing of the Elder Gods	4	The elder gods have fled	A Rhyme of Salem Town and Other Poems	2002	Untitled ("The elder gods have fled")		Tentative title^{B} (Lord 1976, p. 308)	Lord 1976, p. 308; Herman 2006, p. 192
Passionate Typist, The	12	My love, to you this verse I pen	The Howard Review #5	Nov 1976				Lord 1976, p. 308; Herman 2006, p. 192
Path of the Strange Wanderers, The	27	They have broken the lamps and burst the camps	Shadows of Dreams	1989			Letter:^{K} Tevis Clyde Smith, c. March 1929 (Herman 2006, p. 192)	Herman 2006, p. 192
Peasant on the Euphrates, The	10	He saw Old Sumer reel before the hoofs	A Rhyme of Salem Town and Other Poems	2002				Lord 1976, p. 308; Herman 2006, p. 192
Perspective	4	All men look at Life and all look differently	A Rhyme of Salem Town and Other Poems	2002	Untitled ("All men look at life ...")		Tentative title^{B} (Lord 1976, p. 308)	Lord 1976, p. 308; Herman 2006, p. 192
Peter Jackson			n/a	n/a			Lost^{U}	Thom, Herman & Woods, § C
Phantoms Gather, The	6	Up over the cromlech and down the rath	A Rhyme of Salem Town and Other Poems	2002	Untitled ("Up over the cromlech ...")		Tentative title^{B} (Lord 1976, p. 308)	Lord 1976, p. 308; Herman 2006, p. 192
Phases of Life, The	5	Life is the same, yet of many phases	Unaussprechlichen Kulten #2	Jul 1992	Untitled ("Life is the same ...")		Tentative title^{B} (Lord 1976, p. 308); French^{P} (Herman 2006, p. 192)	Lord 1976, p. 308; Herman 2006, p. 192
Phoenix on the Sword, The	Two 4-line verses for a total of 8	3. Under the caverned pyramids great Set coils asleep / 4. When the world was young and men were weak, and the fiends of the night walked free	Always Comes Evening^{A}	1957^{A}	Chapters 2 and 5 are subtitled "The Road of Kings"—-see complete poem under that title)		Epigraph:^{S} The Phoenix on the Sword (Lord 1976, p. 205); The fifth verse was published alone earlier in Crit-Q (1951)' Chapter 1 had no heading; (Herman 2006, p. 192)	Lord 1976, p. 205; Herman 2006, p. 192
Pirate, The (Lord 1976, p. 309)	8	I was born in Devonshire, close by Bristol Bay	A Rhyme of Salem Town and Other Poems	2002			An early work^{C} (Lord 1976, p. 309)	Lord 1976, p. 309; Herman 2006, p. 193
Pirate Remembers, A	22	From the scarlet shadows they come to me	The Grim Land and Others	1976				Lord 1976, p. 309; Herman 2006, p. 193
Plains of Gilban, The	12	Red swirls the dust	A Rhyme of Salem Town and Other Poems	2002	Untitled ("Red swirls the dust")		Tentative title^{B} (Lord 1976, p. 309)	Lord 1976, p. 309; Herman 2006, p. 193
Pledge, A	28	Oe ever they spiked good beer with rum	The Howard Collector #14	Spring 1971				Lord 1976, p. 182; Herman 2006, p. 193
Poet	4	My soul is a blaze	The Cross Plainsman	Aug 2004		Wikisource	Letter:^{K} Tevis Clyde Smith, June 23, 1926 (Herman 2006, p. 193); PD^{L}	Herman 2006, p. 193
Poets, The	28	Out of the somber night the poets come	Weird Tales	Mar 1938		"The Poets"		Lord 1976, p. 182; Herman 2006, p. 193
Poet's Skull, A	56	My empty skull is full of dust	Shadows of Dreams	1989	Untitled: ("My empty skull is full of dust")		Letter:^{K} Tevis Clyde Smith, undated (Herman 2006, p. 193)	Herman 2006, p. 193
Pool of the Black One, The	6	Into the west, unknown of man	Lost Continents^{A}	1954^{A}			Epigraph:^{S} The Pool of the Black One (Lord 1976, p. 205)	Lord 1976, p. 205; Herman 2006, p. 193
Prelude	4	I caught Joan alone upon her bed	A Rhyme of Salem Town and Other Poems	2002	Untitled ("I caught Joan alone upon her bed")		Tentative title^{B} (Lord 1976, p. 309)	Lord 1976, p. 309; Herman 2006, p. 193
Pretty Polly	56	"Now take a part of your father's gold ..."	The Collected Letters of Robert E. Howard, Volume 1: 1923-1929	Jun 2007		https://www.youtube.com/watch?v=bq6RldgW7NQ	Mnemonic reconstruction^{V} of "Lady Isabel and the Elf Knight" a.k.a. "The Outlandish Knight"; Letter:^{K} Robert W. Gordon, April 9, 1926; NOT INCLUDED IN COLLECTED POETRY	
Primal Urge, The	7	The wild geese fly south, carving the cold blue sky	Desire and Other Erotic Poems	1989			Tentative title^{B} (Lord 1976, p. 309)	Lord 1976, p. 309; Herman 2006, p. 194
Prince and Beggar	18	I was a prince of China, lord of a million spears	Always Comes Evening	1957	Untitled ("I was a prince of China, lord of a million spears ...")		Originally untitled (Lord 1976, p. 182)	Lord 1976, p. 182; Herman 2006, p. 194
Private Magrath of the A.E.F.	39	The night was as dark as a Bowery saloon	The Yellow Jacket^{F}	13 January 1927		Wikisource	One line was omitted in all printed versions (Lord 1976, p. 183); First line originally ended "Harlem coon"; PD^{L}	Lord 1976, p. 183; Herman 2006, p. 194
Proem	148	Let no man read here who lives only in the world about him. ...	Etchings In Ivory (Chapbook)	1968	Untitled introduction to ETCHINGS IN IVORY			
Prude	4	I dare not join my sisters in the street	The Last of the Trunk Och Brev I Urval	Mar 2007		Wikisource	Letter:^{K} Tevis Clyde Smith, June 23, 1926 (Herman 2006, p. 194); PD^{L}	Herman 2006, p. 194
Quatrain of Beauty, A	4	Silky winds are sighing low	A Rhyme of Salem Town and Other Poems	2002	A Quattrain of Beauty			Lord 1976, p. 309; Herman 2006, p. 194
Queen of the Black Coast	23	"Believe green buds awaken in the spring ..."; "In that dead citadel of crumbling stone ..."; "Was it a dream the nighted lotus brought? ..."; "The shadows were black around him ..."; "Now we are done with roaming, evermore ...")	Always Comes Evening^{A}	1957^{A}	Song of Bêlit, The		Epigraph:^{S} Queen of the Black Coast (Lord 1976, p. 205)	Lord 1976, p. 205; Herman 2006, pp. 208, 194
Rain No Mo' (Early Version)	2 4-line verses, plus a 4-line chorus repeated after each verse	Steal, steal, steal all around	The Collected Letters of Robert E. Howard, Volume 1: 1923-1929	Jun 2007			Mnemonic reconstruction^{V} of an old folk song, possibly this one: https://www.youtube.com/watch?v=Izug5iG-Ewo Letter:^{K} Robert W. Gordon, February 4, 1925; NOT INCLUDED IN COLLECTED POETRY	
Ramona! Romona!	4	Romona! Romona!	The Last of the Trunk Och Brev I Urval	Mar 2007	Untitled: Romona! Romona!	Wikisource	Letter:^{K} Tevis Clyde Smith, c. November–December 1928 (Herman 2006, p. 229); PD^{L}; "Ramona" spelling probably a typo	Herman 2006, p. 229
Rattle of Drums	48	Rattle of drums	A Rhyme of Salem Town and Other Poems	2002	Untitled ("Rattle of drums")		Tentative title^{B} (Lord 1976, p. 309)	Lord 1976, p. 309; Herman 2006, p. 194
Rattlesnake Sings in the Grass, A	20	Oh, brother coiling in the acrid grass	n/a	n/a		Wikisource	Shares lines with Hymn of Hatred (Lord 1976, p. 309); Never published (Herman 2006, p. 194); PD^{L}	Lord 1976, p. 309; Herman 2006, p. 194
Rebel	108	I lived upon the earth of yore	Singers in the Shadows	1970	The Rebel			Lord 1976, p. 183; Herman 2006, p. 194
Rebel souls from the falling dark	8	Rebel souls from the falling dark	The Collected Letters of Robert E. Howard, Volume 1: 1923-1929	Jun 2007	Untitled: Rebel souls from the falling dark	Wikisource	Letter:^{K} Tevis Clyde Smith, c. November 1928 (Herman 2006, p. 229); PD^{L}	Herman 2006, p. 229
Rebellion	14	The marble statues tossed against the sky	Poet's Scroll	Feb 1929		Wikisource	Pen name: Patrick Howard^{O} (Herman 2006, p. 194); Letter:^{K} Tevis Clyde Smith, c. November 1928 (Herman 2006, p. 194); PD^{L}	Herman 2006, p. 194
Recompense	24	I have not heard lutes beckon me, nor the brazen bugles call	Weird Tales	Nov 1938		"Recompense" Wikisource		Lord 1976, p. 183; Herman 2006, p. 195
Red Blades of Black Cathay	12	Trumpets die in the loud parade	Always Comes Evening^{A}	1957^{A}			Epigraph:^{S} Red Blades of Black Cathay (Lord 1976, p. 206)	Lord 1976, p. 206; Herman 2006, p. 195
"Red swirls the dust"	12	Red swirls the dust	A Rhyme of Salem Town and Other Poems	2002	Plains of Gilban, The; Untitled ("Red swirls the dust")		Tentative title^{B} (Lord 1976, p. 309)	Lord 1976, p. 309; Herman 2006, p. 193
Red Thunder	24	Thunder in the black skies, beating down the rain	JAPM: The Poetry Weekly	16 September 1929		Wikisource	PD^{L}	Lord 1976, p. 309; Herman 2006, p. 195
Remembrance	14	Eight thousand years ago a man I slew	Weird Tales	Apr 1928		"Remembrance"		Lord 1976, p. 183; Herman 2006, p. 195; Howard 2008, p. x
Reminiscence			n/a	n/a			Lost^{U}	Thom, Herman & Woods, § C
Renunciation	59	By the crimson cliffs where the spray is blown	The Last of the Trunk Och Brev I Urval	Mar 2007		Wikisource	Letter:^{K}to Tevis Clyde Smith, undated (Herman 2006, p. 195); PD^{L}	Herman 2006, p. 195
Repentance	36	How is it that I am what I am	The Last of the Trunk Och Brev I Urval	Mar 2007		Wikisource	Letter:^{K} Tevis Clyde Smith, c. March 1928 (Herman 2006, p. 196); PD^{L}	Herman 2006, p. 196
Retribution	22	The moon above the Kerry hills had risen scarce a span	Always Comes Evening	1957	Black Michael's Story; The Song of Murtagh O'Brien; Untitled ("The moon above the Kerry hills ...")	"Retribution"	Titled Retribution from an untitled draft, Howard's original title The Song of Murtagh O'Brien was found on a later copy (Herman 2006, p. 196)	Lord 1976, p. 183; Herman 2006, p. 196
Return of Sir Richard Grenville, The	44	One slept beneath the branches dim	Red Shadows	1968	Untitled ("One slept beneath the branches dim")		Originally untitled (Lord 1976, p. 183); A Solomon Kane poem	Lord 1976, p. 183; Herman 2006, p. 196
Return of the Sea-Farer, The	36	Thorfinn, Thorfinn, where have you been?	Weirdbook #13	1978	Untitled: ("Thorfinn, Thorfinn, where have you been?")			Lord 1976, p. 309; Herman 2006, p. 196
Reuben's Birthright	42	The Black Prince scowled above his lance, and wrath in his hot eyes lay	The Junto^{H} The Howard Collector #2	Aug 1929; Spring 1962	The Skull in the Clouds	Wikisource	Conflict:^{M} Lord (1976, p. 186), The Howard Collector, 1962/Herman (2006, p. 204), The Junto, 1929; PD^{L}	Lord 1976, p. 186 { Herman 2006, p. 196
Reuben's Brethren	16	Drain the cup while the ale is bright	The Howard Collector #11	Spring 1969			Letter:^{K} H. P. Lovecraft, c. October 1930 (Herman 2006, p. 197)	Lord 1976, p. 184; Herman 2006, p. 197
Revolt Pagan	16	High on the hills where the white winds thunder	Verses of Ebony	1975				Lord 1976, p. 309; Herman 2006, p. 197
A Rhyme of Faring Town	28	Her house, a moulting buzzard on the Hill	Verses in Ebony	1975	Legend of Faring Town, A			Lord 1976, p. 305; Herman 2006, p. 180; Howard 2008, p. x
Rhyme of Salem Town, A	74	As I went down to Salem town, I met good Mistress Meek	A Rhyme of Salem Town and Other Poems	2002	Untitled ("As I went down to Salem town ...")		Tentative title^{B} (Lord 1976, p. 309)	Lord 1976, p. 309; Herman 2006, p. 197
Rhyme of the Three Slavers, The	48	Still and dim lay sea and land	The Rhyme of the Three Slavers	Oct 1983				Lord 1976, p. 309; Herman 2006, p. 197
Rhyme of the Viking Path, The	24	Serpent prow on the Afric coast	The Howard Collector #11	Spring 1969	Thor's Son		Letter:^{K} Tevis Clyde Smith; c. May 1930) (Herman 2006, p. 214)	Lord 1976, p. 189; Herman 2006, p. 214
Ride of Falume, The	24	Falume of Spain rode forth amain when twilight's crimson fell	Weird Tales	Oct 1927		Wikisource	PD^{L}	Lord 1976, p. 184; Herman 2006, p. 197
Riders of Babylon, The	22	The riders of Babylon clatter forth	Weird Tales	Jan 1928		Wikisource	PD^{L}	Lord 1976, p. 184; Herman 2006, p. 197
Riding Song	20	Do you know the terrible thrill that comes	The Howard Review #2	Mar 1975			Not to be confused with "A Riding Song"	Lord 1976, p. 309; Herman 2006, p. 197
Riding Song, A	20	Blast away the black veil, / Blast away the blue	Shadows of Dreams	1989			Not to be confused with "Riding Song"	Herman 2006, p. 198
"Rise to the peak of the ladder"	16	Rise to the peak of the ladder	The Ghost Ocean and Other Poems of the Supernatural	1982	Never Beyond the Beast; Untitled ("Rise to the peak of the ladder")		Tentative title^{B} (Lord 1976, p. 306)	Lord 1976, p. 306; Herman 2006, pp. 187–188
The Road			n/a	n/a			Lost^{U}	Thom, Herman & Woods, § C
Road of Azrael, The	22	Towers reel as they burst asunder	Always Comes Evening^{A}	1957^{A}	The Song Of Skel Thorwald's Son	"The Road of Azrael"	Originally untitled (Lord 1976, p. 184); Epigraph:^{S} The Road of Azrael (Lord 1976, p. 184)	Lord 1976, pp. 184 & 315; Herman 2006, p. 198
Road of Kings, The	12	When I was a fighting man, the kettle drums they beat	Always Comes Evening^{A}	1957^{A}	The Phoenix on the Sword (verse heading); The Scarlet Citadel (verse heading)		Epigraph:^{S} The Phoenix on the Sword and The Scarlet Citadel (Herman 2006, p. 198)	Lord 1976, pp. 204–205; Herman 2006, p. 198
Road to Babel, The	108	Along the road to Babel ...	Shadows of Dreams	1989			Letter:^{K} Tevis Clyde Smith, October 1927	
Road to Bliss, The	28	I did not give a tinker's curse / For the Stuarts or the Church ...	A Rhyme of Salem Town and Other Poems	2002				
Road to Freedom, The	10	Some day I'm going out on the Road	Cross Plains #7	Sep 1975				Lord 1976, p. 309; Herman 2006, p. 198
Road to Hell, The	28	Along the road that leads to Hell	Singers in the Shadows	1970	Untitled ("The road to hell ...")	Wikisource	Lines 1-4 similar to lines 69-72 of The Dust Dance (version 1) (Lord 1976, p. 184); PD^{L}	Lord 1976, p. 184; Herman 2006, p. 198
Road to Rest, The ^{N}	44	I will rise some day when the day is done	The Junto^{H} The Howard Collector #3	Aug 1929; Autumn 1962	Surrender (1)	Wikisource	PD^{L}; Conflict: Lord (1976, p. 189), The Howard Collector, 1962/Herman (2006, p. 212), The Junto, 1929	Herman 2006, p. 198
Road to Rome, The	54	Ah, feet that left a bloody track	The Road to Rome	1972				Lord 1976, p. 184; Herman 2006, p. 198
Road to Yesterday, The	16	The dust is deep along the trail	The Grim Land and Others	1976			Suggested by the Cecil B. DeMille film The Road to Yesterday (Herman 2006, p. 199)	Lord 1976, p. 309; Herman 2006, p. 199
Roads	4	I too have strode those white-paved that run	The Howard Collector #17	Autumn 1972	Untitled ("I too have strode those white-paved roads")		Originally untitled (Lord 1976, p. 184)	Lord 1976, p. 184; Herman 2006, p. 199
Roar, Silver Trumpets	8	Roar, silver trumpets, in your pride	Night Images	1976	Untitled ("Roar, silver trumpets")		Tentative title^{B} (Lord 1976, p. 309)	Lord 1976, p. 309; Herman 2006, p. 199
Robes of the Righteous, The	21	I am a saintly reformer, basking in goodly renown	The Last of the Trunk Och Brev I Urval	Mar 2007		Wikisource	Letter:^{K} Tevis Clyde Smith, c. September 1927 (Herman 2006, p. 199); PD^{L}	Herman 2006, p. 199
Rogues in the House (verse heading)	3	One fled			Old Rime		This poem has only appeared with the story	
Roman Lady, A	40	There is a strangeness in my soul	The Last of the Trunk Och Brev I Urval	Mar 2007	Similar to "Ecstasy," a.k.a. UNTITLED: ("There is a strangeness in my soul ...")	Wikisource	Letter:^{K} Tevis Clyde Smith, c. June 1928 (Herman 2006, p. 199); PD^{L}	Herman 2006, p. 199
Romance (1)^{N}	23	I am king of all the Ages	A Rhyme of Salem Town and Other Poems	2002		Wikisource		Lord 1976, p. 309; Herman 2006, p. 199
Romance (2)^{N}	Shouting I come, flouting I come	The Last of the Trunk Och Brev I Urval	Mar 2007				Letter:^{K} Tevis Clyde Smith, June 23, 1926 (Herman 2006, p. 199) PD^{L}	Herman 2006, p. 199
Romany Road	16	Some day I'll go down a Romany Road	Shadows of Dreams	1989			Letter:^{K} Tevis Clyde Smith, c. January 1928 (Herman 2006, p. 199)	Herman 2006, p. 199
Romona! Romona!	4	Romona! Romona!	The Last of the Trunk Och Brev I Urval	Mar 2007	Untitled: Ramona! Romona!	Wikisource	Letter:^{K} Tevis Clyde Smith, c. November–December 1928 (Herman 2006, p. 229); PD^{L}	Herman 2006, p. 229
Roses laughed in her pretty hair	10	Roses laughed in her pretty hair	The Collected Letters of Robert E. Howard, Volume 1: 1923-1929	Jun 2007	Untitled: Roses laughed in her pretty hair	Wikisource	Letter:^{K} Tevis Clyde Smith, August 28, 1925 (Herman 2006, p. 229); PD^{L}	Herman 2006, p. 229
Roundelay of the Roughneck	60	Let others croon of lovers' moon	The Daniel Baker Collegian^{G}	12 April 1926		Wikisource	PD^{L}	Lord 1976, p. 184; Herman 2006, p. 200
Rover, The	35	In the heather hills of Scotland	A Rhyme of Salem Town and Other Poems	2002			Tentative title^{B} (Lord 1976, p. 310); An early work^{C} (Lord 1976, p. 310)	Lord 1976, p. 310; Herman 2006, p. 200
Rulers, The	64	In everlasting legions	A Rhyme of Salem Town and Other Poems	2002				Lord 1976, p. 310; Herman 2006, p. 200
Rules of Etiquette	25	If a girl stops you to talk while you are chasing your trains	The Progress^{J}	1 February 1924		Wikisource	PD^{L}	Herman 2006, p. 200
Rune	34	Gods of heather, god of lake	Always Comes Evening	1957	Rune of the Ancient One; Untitled ("Gods of heather, gods of lake")	"Rune"	From:^{T} Men of the Shadows (Lord 1976, p. 185); Originally untitled (Lord 1976, p. 185); Separate version called Rune of the Ancient One (Herman 2006, p. 200)	Lord 1976, p. 185; Herman 2006, p. 200
Rune of the Ancient One								Herman 2006, p. 200
Russian Bill			n/a	n/a			Lost^{U}	Thom, Herman & Woods, § C
Sacrifice	28	The baron sat in his lordly seat	Singers in the Shadows	1970				Lord 1976, p. 185; Herman 2006, p. 200
The Sacrifice	8	Her face was white, the naked girl they sat	Yesteryear #4	Oct 1989			Letter:^{K} Tevis Clyde Smith, c. February 1929 (Herman 2006, p. 187); Third poem in the cycle "The Mysteries"	Herman 2006, p. 187
A Saga of Bjorn The Dane			n/a	n/a			Lost^{U}	Thom, Herman & Woods, § C
Sailor	8	I saw a mermaid sporting in the bay	The Last of the Trunk Och Brev I Urval	Mar 2007		Wikisource	Letter:^{K} Tevis Clyde Smith, June 23, 1926 (Herman 2006, p. 200); PD^{L}	Herman 2006, p. 200
Sam Bass	8+2	Sam Bass was born in Indiana, that was his native home / He always drank good liquor wherever he might be!	A Means to Freedom: The Letters of H. P. Lovecraft and Robert E. Howard Volume 1: 1930–1932	2011		https://www.youtube.com/watch?v=6ouJPYL9tqI	Mnemonic reconstruction^{V} From a letter to H. P. Lovecraft, ca. January 1931 /In addition, a couplet is embedded in the story "Drums of the Sunset" (a.k.a. "Riders of the Sunset") First published in The Cross Plains Review, November 1928–January 1929 (in 9 parts)	
Samson's Brooding	20	I will go down to Philistia	Shadows of Dreams	1989			Letter:^{K} Tevis Clyde Smith, c. August 1932 (Herman 2006, p. 201)	Herman 2006, p. 201
San Jacinto (1)^{N}	12	Flowers bloom on San Jacinto	Shadows of Dreams	1989		Wikisource	Letter:^{K} Tevis Clyde Smith, June 23, 1926 (Herman 2006, p. 201); PD^{L}	Herman 2006, p. 201
San Jacinto (2)^{N}	32	Red fields of glory	The Last of the Trunk Och Brev I Urval	Mar 2007				Lord 1976, p. 310; Herman 2006, p. 201
Sand-Hills' Crest, The	39	Here where the post oaks crown the ridge, and the dreary sand-drifts lie	A Robert E. Howard Memorial: June 13–15, 1986	1986			Tentative title^{B} (Lord 1976, p. 310)	Lord 1976, p. 310; Herman 2006, p. 201
Sandford Burns	48	My name it is Sandford Burns	The Collected Letters of Robert E. Howard, Volume 1: 1923-1929	Jun 2007	"The State of Arkansaw";	https://www.youtube.com/watch?v=_mAnoTTyGqY; https://www.youtube.com/watch?v=XIU-7G7txmo	Mnemonic reconstruction^{V} of "The State of Arkansaw"; Letter:^{K} Robert W. Gordon, February 15, 1926; NOT INCLUDED IN COLLECTED POETRY	
Sands of the Desert, The	4	A sea of molten silver	Dragonfields #3	Summer 1980	Untitled ("A sea of molten silver")		Dragonfields is a Canadian chapbook (Herman 2006, p. 201); Tentative title^{B} (Lord 1976, p. 310)	Lord 1976, p. 310; Herman 2006, p. 201
Sands of Time, The	12	Slow sift the sands of Time; the yellowed leaves	The Howard Collector #1; Fire and Sleet and Candlelight	Summer 1961; 1961	Untitled ("Slow shifts the sands of time ...")	Wikisource	Conflict:^{M} Lord (1976, p. 185), Fire and Sleet and Candlelight, 1961/Herman (2006, p. 201), The Howard Collector, 1961; Letter:^{K} Harold Preece, November 24, 1930 (Herman 2006, p. 201); Originally untitled (Lord 1976, p. 185); PD^{L}	Lord 1976, p. 185; Herman 2006, p. 201
Sang the King of Midian	24	These I will give to you, Astair: an armlet of frozen gold	Weird Tales	Apr 1930	Song Out of Midian	Wikisource	Letter:^{K} Tevis Clyde Smith; undated)	Herman 2006, p. 201
The Sapayat of Omarge Gayhim			n/a	n/a			Lost^{U}	Thom, Herman & Woods, § C
A sappe ther wos and that a crumbe manne	16	A sappe ther wos and that a crumbe manne	The Collected Letters of Robert E. Howard, Volume 1: 1923-1929	Jun 2007	Untitled: A sappe ther wos and that a crumbe manne	Wikisource	Letter:^{K} Tevis Clyde Smith, c. November 1928 (Herman 2006, p. 230); PD^{L} Parody of the section of Chaucer's Prologue to the Canterbury Tales involving the Knight ("A knyght ther was, and that a worthy man ...")	Herman 2006, p. 230
Sappho, the Grecian hills are gold	4	Sappho, the Grecian hills are gold	The Last of the Trunk Och Brev I Urval	Mar 2007	Untitled: Sappho, the Grecian hills are gold	Wikisource	Letter:^{K} Tevis Clyde Smith, c. November–December 1928 (Herman 2006, p. 230); PD^{L}	Herman 2006, p. 230
Saul Falls On His Sword			n/a	n/a			Lost^{U}	Thom, Herman & Woods, § C
Scarlet and gold are the stars tonight	8	Scarlet and gold are the stars tonight	The Cross Plainsman	Aug 2004 (last four lines only) / The Collected Letters of Robert E. Howard, Volume 1: 1923-1929 (first full appearance)	Adventures; Untitled: Scarlet and gold are the stars tonight	Wikisource	Letter:^{K} Tevis Clyde Smith, c. November 1928 (Herman 2006, p. 230); PD^{L}	Herman 2006, p. 230
Scarlet Citadel, The	18 + a prose proverb		Weird Tales	January 1933			verse headings for the CONAN story of the same name: The verse heading for Chapter 1 is titled "Old Ballad" (6 lines); Chapter 2 is "The Road of Kings" (4 lines); Chapter 3 is the second part of "Old Ballad" (6 lines); Chapter 4 has a short proverb ("The sword that slays the king cuts the cords of the empire."); and Chapter 5 is "Song of the Bossonian Archers" (2 lines)	Herman 2006, p. 201
"The scarlet standards of the sun" ^{N}	64	The scarlet standards of the sun	The Ghost Ocean and Other Poems of the Supernatural	1982	Adventurer's Mistress, The (1); Untitled ("The scarlet standards of the sun")		a draft version with a different 4th stanza is found in the notes of COLLECTED POETRY	Lord 1976, p. 300; Herman 2006, p. 148; Thom, Herman & Woods, § A
The Scouts Lament	40	Come all of you, my brother scouts	The Collected Letters of Robert E. Howard, Volume 1: 1923-1929	Jun 2007			Mnemonic reconstruction^{V} of "The Old Scouts' Lament" by John A. Lomax; virtually identical to original Letter:^{K} Robert W. Gordon, March 17, 1927; NOT INCLUDED IN COLLECTED POETRY	
Sea, The	48	The sea, the sea, the rolling sea	The Baylor United Statement; The Cross Plains Review^{E}	Spring 1923; 29 June 1923		Wikisource	Conflict:^{M} Lord (1976, p. 185) Cross Plains Review, 1923/Herman (2006, p. 202), The Baylor United Statement, 1923; PD^{L}	Lord 1976, p. 185; Herman 2006, p. 202
Sea and the Sunrise, The	8	The dawn on the ocean is rising	A Rhyme of Salem Town and Other Poems	2002				Lord 1976, p. 310; Herman 2006, p. 202
Sea-Chant	4	Topaz seas and laughing skies	A Rhyme of Salem Town and Other Poems	2002	Untitled ("Topaz seas and laughing skies")		Tentative title^{B} (Lord 1976, p. 310)	Lord 1976, p. 310; Herman 2006, p. 202
Sea-Girl, The	24	My love is the girl of the jade green gown	Whispers #4	Jul 1974				Lord 1976, p. 310; Herman 2006, p. 202
"A sea of molten silver"	4	A sea of molten silver	Dragonfields #3	Summer 1980	Sands of the Desert, The; Untitled ("A sea of molten silver")		Dragonfields is a Canadian chapbook (Herman 2006, p. 201); Tentative title^{B} (Lord 1976, p. 310)	Lord 1976, p. 310; Herman 2006, p. 201
Sea Slumber			n/a	n/a			Lost^{U}	Thom, Herman & Woods, § C
Sea-Woman, The	16	The wild sea is beating	Singers in the Shadows	1970				Lord 1976, p. 185; Herman 2006, p. 202
The Search	27	They came to a village which lay / Within a king's domains	The Collected Letters of Robert E. Howard, Volume 1: 1923-1929	Jun 2007	Untitled: ("They came to a village which lay / Within a king's domains ...")		Mnemonic reconstruction^{V} of "The Search" by Edgar Lee Masters; Letter:^{K} Robert W. Gordon, February 4, 1925; NOT INCLUDED IN COLLECTED POETRY	
Secrets	58	There is a serpent lifts his crest o' nights	The Collected Letters of Robert E. Howard, Volume 1: 1923-1929	Jun 2007		Wikisource	Letter:^{K} Tevis Clyde Smith, c. March 1928 (Herman 2006, p. 202); PD^{L}	Herman 2006, p. 202
The Seekers And The Dreamer			n/a	n/a			Lost^{U}	Thom, Herman & Woods, § C
Senor Zorro	41	In the olden days of ancient lore	A Rhyme of Salem Town and Other Poems	2002			An early work^{C} (Lord 1976, p. 310)	Lord 1976, p. 310; Herman 2006, p. 202
The Sepoy			n/a	n/a			Lost^{U}	Thom, Herman & Woods, § C
Serpent	25	I am the symbol of Creation and Destruction	The Last of the Trunk Och Brev I Urval	Mar 2007		Wikisource	Letter:^{K} Tevis Clyde Smith, June 23, 1926 (Herman 2006, p. 202); PD^{L}	Herman 2006, p. 202
Seven Kings	16	Seven kings of the grey old cities	Fantasy Tales #11	Winter 1982	Untitled ("Seven kings of the grey old cities")		British^{P} (Herman 2006, p. 202); Tentative title^{B} (Lord 1976, p. 310)	Lord 1976, p. 310; Herman 2006, p. 202
"Seven kings of the grey old cities"	16	Seven kings of the grey old cities	Fantasy Tales #11	Winter 1982	Seven Kings; Untitled ("Seven kings of the grey old cities")		British^{P} (Herman 2006, p. 202); Tentative title^{B} (Lord 1976, p. 310)	Lord 1976, p. 310; Herman 2006, p. 202
Seven-Up Ballad, The	30	Carl Macon was a kollege kid of far and wide renown	Costigan Special #1	Nov 1982			Costigan Special was distributed as part of REHUPA #60 (Herman 2006, pp. 202, 399)	Lord 1976, p. 310; Herman 2006, p. 202
The shades of night were falling faster	6	The shades of night were falling faster	The Last of the Trunk Och Brev I Urval	Mar 2007	Untitled: The shades of night were falling faster	Wikisource	Letter:^{K} Tevis Clyde Smith, April 14, 1926 (Herman 2006, p. 230); PD^{L}	Herman 2006, p. 230
Shadow of Dreams	39	Stay not from me, that veil	Poet's Scroll	Aug 1929	Stay Not From Me; Untitled ("Stay not from me, that veil ...")	Wikisource	Pen name: Patrick Howard^{O} (Herman 2006, p. 202); Letter:^{K} Tevis Clyde Smith, c. December 1928 (Herman 2006, p. 202); PD^{L} [NOT to be confused with SHADOWS OF DREAMS!]	Herman 2006, p. 202
Shadow of the Beast, The	4	As long as evil stars arise					Epigraph:^{S} The Shadow of the Beast (Lord 1976, p. 315)	Lord 1976, p. 315
Shadow Thing	28	There was a thing of the shadow world	The Ghost Ocean and Other Poems of the Supernatural	1982	Untitled ("There was a thing of the shadow world")		Tentative title^{B} (Lord 1976, p. 310); From:^{T} Untitled, begins "As he approached the two..." (Lord 1976, p. 310)/(Herman 2006, p. 203)	Lord 1976, p. 310; Herman 2006, p. 203
Shadows (1)^{N}	20	A black moon nailed against a sullen dawn	n/a	n/a		Wikisource	Part 1 of 5 in the Black Dawn cycle (Herman 2006, pp. 154, 203); Never published separately (Herman 2006, p. 203)	Herman 2006, p. 203
Shadows (2)^{N}	14	Grey ghost, dim ghost	Singers in the Shadows	1970				Lord 1976, p. 185; Herman 2006, p. 203
Shadows (3)^{N}	20	I am that which was, was never	The Last of the Trunk Och Brev I Urval	Mar 2007		Wikisource	Letter:^{K} Tevis Clyde Smith, June 23, 1926 (Herman 2006, p. 203); PD^{L}	Herman 2006, p. 203
Shadows from Yesterday	28	Ages ago, in the dawn of Time, I looked on a man with hate	The Ghost Ocean and Other Poems of the Supernatural	1982				Lord 1976, p. 310; Herman 2006, p. 203
Shadows of Dreams	102	Men sing of poets who leave their sheets	Shadows of Dreams	1989			Letter:^{K} Tevis Clyde Smith, undated (Herman 2006, p. 203); NOT to be confused with SHADOW OF DREAMS!	Herman 2006, p. 203
Shadows on the Road	46	Nial of Ulster, welcome home	Weird Tales	May 1930		"Shadows on the Road"		Lord 1976, p. 185; Herman 2006, p. 203
"She came in the dim of the desert dawn ..."	36	She came in the dim of the desert dawn	Lone Star Universe	1976	Coming of Bast, The; Untitled: "She came in the dim of the desert dawn ..."		Letter:^{K} Tevis Clyde Smith, undated, a version (Herman 2006, p. 158)	Lord 1976, p. 302; Herman 2006, p. 158; Thom, Herman & Woods, § C
"She came in the grey of the desert dawn ..."	46	She came in the grey of the desert dawn	The Collected Letters Of Robert E. Howard, Volume 3: 1933–1936	2008	Coming of Bast, The—draft; Untitled: "She came in the grey of the desert dawn ..."		Letter:^{K} Tevis Clyde Smith, undated, beginning "Ha, Ha! Your not going ..." (Herman 2006, p. 158)	Lord 1976, p. 302; Herman 2006, p. 158; Thom, Herman & Woods, § C
The Shellback's Prayer			n/a	n/a			Lost^{U}	Thom, Herman & Woods, § C
Ships	22	There's a far, lone island in the dim, red west	Weird Tales	Jul 1938		"Ships"	Lines 1–4 identical to lines 1–4 of "The Isle of Hy-Brasil"; lines 5–22 identical to lines 20–38 of the same; all the lines from this poem are included in "The Isle of Hy-Brasil", which is slightly longer, with just a few word changes (Lord 1976, p. 185)	Lord 1976, p. 185; Herman 2006, p. 203
Shrines	26	Mohammed, Buddha, Moses, Satan, Thor!					Part 3 of 5 in the Black Dawn cycle (Herman 2006, pp. 154, 203); Never published separately (Herman 2006, p. 203)	Herman 2006, p. 203
Sighs in the Yellow Leaves	20	I took an ivory grinning joss	The Last of the Trunk Och Brev I Urval	Mar 2007		Wikisource	Letter:^{K} Tevis Clyde Smith, undated (Herman 2006, p. 203); PD^{L}	Herman 2006, p. 203
Sign of the Sickle, The	10	Flashing sickle and falling grain	A Rhyme of Salem Town and Other Poems	2002			Shares lines with Timur-langd (Lord 1976, p. 310)	Lord 1976, p. 310; Herman 2006, p. 204
Silence Falls on Mecca's Walls	30	Silence Falls on Mecca's Walls	Cthulhu the Mythos and Kindred Horrors	May 1987	Untitled ("Silence falls on Mecca's walls")		Originally untitled (Herman 2006, p. 204); Letter:^{K} Tevis Clyde Smith, c. December 1928 (Herman 2006, p. 204)	Herman 2006, p. 204
Singer in the Mist, The	14	At birth a witch laid on me monstrous spells	Weird Tales	Apr 1938	Singer in the Mist, A	"The Singer in the Mist"	First poem of five from the Sonnets Out of Bedlam cycle; (Herman 2006, p. 204)	Lord 1976, p. 185; Herman 2006, p. 204
Singing Hemp	16	Aslaf sat in the dragon bows	Verses in Ebony	1975				Lord 1976, p. 310; Herman 2006, p. 204
Singing in the Wind	44	Singing joy, singing joy	The Junto^{H} The Howard Collector #14	Jul 1929; Spring 1971			Conflict:^{M} Lord (1976, p. 186), The Howard Collector, 1971/Herman (2006, p. 204), The Junto, 1929	Lord 1976, p. 186; Herman 2006, p. 204
Skull in the Clouds, The	42	The Black Prince scowled above his lance, and wrath in his hot eyes lay	The Junto^{H} The Howard Collector #2	Aug 1929; Spring 1962	Reuben's Birthright	Wikisource	Conflict:^{M} Lord (1976, p. 186), The Howard Collector, 1962/Herman (2006, p. 204), The Junto, 1929; PD^{L}	Lord 1976, p. 186; Herman 2006, p. 204
Skull of Silence, The	6	—And a dozen death-blots blotched him	Seanchai #82	Aug 1997			From:^{T} The Skull of Silence verse heading (not published in its first printing) (Herman 2006, p. 204); Distributed as part of REHUPA #146 (Herman 2006, pp. 204, 433)	Herman 2006, p. 204
Skulls	24	Oh, ye who dine on evil wine	Fantasy Book	Sep 1984				Lord 1976, p. 310; Herman 2006, p. 205
Skulls Against the Dawn	32	Oh, who comes down the mountain, a stalking oak at morning			Skulls Over Judah		there are two slightly different versions, each with one of the alternative names	Herman 2006, p. 205
Skulls and Dust	23	The Persian slaughtered the Apis Bull	American Poet	May 1929		Wikisource	Pen name: Patrick Howard^{O} (Lord 1976, p. 169); PD^{L}; Won $3 prize for best poem in that issue of American Poet (Herman 2006, p. 205)	Lord 1976, p. 169; Herman 2006, p. 205
Skulls and Orchids	(1,795 words)	Surely it was in decadent Athens—in marble-throned Athens of Sophocles in the Periclean Age.	Etchings in Ivory (Chapbook)	1968			Second "prose poem" in the Etchings in Ivory cycle	
Skulls Over Judah	16	Oh, who comes down the mountain, a stalking oak at morning	The Howard Collector #9	Spring 1967	Skulls Against the Dawn		Letter:^{K} Tevis Clyde Smith, undated (Herman 2006, p. 205);there are two slightly different versions, each with one of the alternative names	Lord 1976, p. 186; Herman 2006, p. 205
Slaves			n/a	n/a			Lost^{U}, different line count from "The Slaves"	Thom, Herman & Woods, § C
The Slaves			n/a	n/a			Lost^{U}, different line count from "Slaves"	Thom, Herman & Woods, § C
Slayer, The	24	The women come and the women go	A Rhyme of Salem Town and Other Poems	2002	Untitled ("The women come and the women go")	Wikisource	Letter:^{K} Tevis Clyde Smith, c. December 1928 (Herman 2006, p. 205); PD^{L}	Herman 2006, p. 205
"Slow shifts the sands of time ..."	12	Slow sift the sands of Time; the yellowed leaves	The Howard Collector #1; Fire and Sleet and Candlelight	Summer 1961; 1961	Sands of Time, The; Untitled ("Slow shifts the sands of time ...")	Wikisource	Conflict:^{M} Lord (1976, p. 185), Fire and Sleet and Candlelight, 1961/Herman (2006, p. 201), The Howard Collector, 1961; Letter:^{K} Harold Preece, November 24, 1930 (Herman 2006, p. 201); Originally untitled (Lord 1976, p. 185); PD^{L}	Lord 1976, p. 185; Herman 2006, p. 201
Slugger's Vow	9	How your right thudded on my jaw	Robert E. Howard's Fight Magazine #4	Oct 1996	Untitled ("How your right thudded on my jaw")		Letter:^{K} Tevis Clyde Smith, January 30, 1925 (Herman 2006, p. 205)	Herman 2006, p. 205
Slumber	28	A silver scroll against a marble sky	Magazine of Horror #30	Dec 1969				Lord 1976, p. 186; Herman 2006, p. 205
"The snow-capped peaks of Ural ..."	20	The snow-capped peaks of Ural shone white against the sky	A Rhyme of Salem Town and Other Poems	2002	Tartar Raid, The; Untitled ("The snow-capped peaks of Ural ...")		Tentative title^{B} (Lord 1976, p. 311); Unfinished (Lord 1976, p. 311)	Lord 1976, p. 211; Herman 2006, p. 213
A Soldier's Memories			n/a	n/a			Lost^{U}	Thom, Herman & Woods, § C
Solomon Kane's Homecoming (1)^{N}	44	The white gulls wheeled above the cliffs, the air was slashed with foam	Fanciful Tales	Fall 1936	The Home-Coming Of Solomon; Solomon's Home-coming	Wikisource	Original version; A Solomon Kane poem; PD^{L}	Lord 1976, p. 186; Herman 2006, pp. 205–206
Solomon Kane's Homecoming (2)^{N}	The white gulls wheeled above the cliffs, the wind was slashed with foam,		The Howard Collector #15	Fall 1971			A slightly different version of the poem; A Solomon Kane poem	Herman 2006, p. 206
Solomon's Home-coming
Something About Eve	4	Bugles beckon to red disaster	Echoes From An Iron Harp^{A}	1972^{A}			Epigraph:^{S} Something About Eve (Lord 1976, p. 206)/(Herman 2006, p. 206)	Lord 1976, p. 206; Herman 2006, p. 206
Son of Spartacus, A	24	I pinned him hard in an empty trench	The Dark Man #6	Summer 2001				Herman 2006, p. 206
Song at Midnight (1)	28	I heard an old gibbet that crowned a bare hill	The Phantagraph	Aug 1940	Man, the Master	Wikisource	PD^{L}	Lord 1976, p. 187; Herman 2006, p. 206
Song at Midnight (2) (SPURIOUS RETITLING?)	10	I saw a man going down a long trail	Robert E. Howard Foundation Newsletter Volume 5 Number 3	Fall 2011	Man, The Master	Wikisource	PD^{L} Alternative only mentioned in Herman (2006, p. 183)	Lord 1976, p. 306; Herman 2006, p. 183
Song Before Clontarf	12	Lean on your sword, red-bearded lord, and watch your victims crawl	The Howard Review #2	Mar 1975			Letter:^{K} Harold Preece, March 24, 1930 (Herman 2006, p. 207)	Lord 1976, p. 310; Herman 2006, p. 207
A Song for All Exiles			n/a	n/a			Lost^{U}	Thom, Herman & Woods, § C
Song for All Woman, A	20	Man run naked and free and bold	Night Images (deluxe edition)	1976	Swings and Swings			Lord 1976, p. 310; Herman 2006, p. 207
Song for Men that Laugh, A	24	Satan is my brother, Satan is my son	The Junto^{H} Magazine of Horror #16	Dec 1928; Summer 1967			Conflict:^{M} Lord (1976, p. 187), Magazine of Horror, 1967/Herman (2006, p. 207), The Junto, 1928	Lord 1976, p. 187; Herman 2006, p. 207
Song from an Ebony Heart, A	44	The wine in my cup is bitter dregs	Shadows of Dreams	1989	Untitled ("The wine in my cup is bitter dregs ...")		Letter:^{K} Tevis Clyde Smith; c. November 1928)	Herman 2006, p. 207
Song from the Outer Dark, A	24	My ruthless hands still clutch at life	Kadath #1	1974	Word from the Outer Dark, A		Pen name: Patrick Howard^{O} (Lord 1976, p. 299)	Lord 1976, p. 299; Herman 2006, p. 240
Song of a Fugitive Bard	30	They gave me a dollar and thirty cents when they let me outa my cell	Shadows of Dreams	1989	Untitled ("They gave me a dollar and thirty cents when they let me outa my cell. ...")		Letter:^{K} Tevis Clyde Smith; c. June 1928)	Herman 2006, p. 207
Song of a Mad Minstrel, The	32	I am the thorn in the foot, I am the blur in the sight	Weird Tales	Feb-March 1931		"The Song of a Mad Minstrel"		Lord 1976, p. 187; Herman 2006, p. 207; Howard 2008, p. X
The Song of a Worshipper			n/a	n/a			Lost^{U}	Thom, Herman & Woods, § C
Song of Bards, A	5	Chesterton twanged on his lyre	A Rhyme of Salem Town and Other Poems	2002	Untitled ("Chesterton twanged on his lyre")		Tentative title^{B} (Lord 1976, p. 311)	Lord 1976, p. 311; Herman 2006, p. 208
Song of Bêlit, The	23	"Believe green buds awaken in the spring ..."; "In that dead citadel of crumbling stone ..."; "Was it a dream the nighted lotus brought? ..."; "The shadows were black around him ..."; "Now we are done with roaming, evermore ...")	Always Comes Evening^{A}	1957^{A}	Queen of the Black Coast		Epigraph:^{S} Queen of the Black Coast (Lord 1976, p. 205)	Lord 1976, p. 205; Herman 2006, pp. 208, 194
Song of Bran, The	4	The Caesar lolled on his ivory throne	Always Comes Evening^{A]}	1957^{A}	Kings of the Night		Epigraph:^{S} Kings of the Night (Lord 1976, p. 204)	Lord 1976, p. 204; Herman 2006, pp. 208, 178
Song of Cheer, A	22	I was his mistress, she was his wife; that was the difference it made	The Last of the Trunk Och Brev I Urval	Mar 2007		Wikisource	Letter:^{K} Tevis Clyde Smith; c. March 1928); PD^{L}	Herman 2006, p. 208
Song of College, A	24	Now is chapel gathered, now the seats are full	The Last of the Trunk Och Brev I Urval	Mar 2007		Wikisource	Letter:^{K} Tevis Clyde Smith; undated); PD^{L}	Herman 2006, p. 208
Song of Defeat, A	28	We are they	Magazine of Horror #34	Fall 1970	Untitled ("We are they")		Originally untitled (Lord 1976, p. 187)	Lord 1976, p. 187; Herman 2006, p. 208
Song of Greenwich, A	20	The lords of Greenwich sallied forth	The Last of the Trunk Och Brev I Urval	Mar 2007		Wikisource	Letter:^{K} Tevis Clyde Smith; undated); PD^{L}	Herman 2006, p. 208
Song of Horsa's Galley, The	16	From the Baltic Sea our galleys sweep	The Howard Collector #13	Autumn 1970			Lines 1-4 similar to lines 33-36 of The Dust Dance (version 1) (Lord 1976, p. 187)	Lord 1976, p. 187; Herman 2006, p. 208
Song of Murtagh O'Brien, The	22	The moon above the Kerry hills had risen scarce a span	Always Comes Evening	1957	Black Michael's Story; Retribution; Untitled ("The moon above the Kerry hills ...")	"Retribution"	Titled Retribution from an untitled draft, Howard's original title The Song of Murtagh O'Brien was found on a later copy (Herman 2006, p. 196)	Lord 1976, p. 183; Herman 2006, p. 196
A Song of Omar			n/a	n/a			Lost^{U}	Thom, Herman & Woods, § C
Song of Skel Thorwald's Son, The	4	We shall not see the hills again where the grey cloud limns the oak					Epigraph:^{S} The Road of Azrael (Lord 1976, p. 315)	Lord 1976, p. 315
Song of the Anchor Chain, A	52	Let down, let out the anchor	Shadows of Dreams	1989			Letter:^{K} Tevis Clyde Smith; c. November 1928)	Herman 2006, p. 208
Song of the Bats, The	21	The dusk was on the mountain	Weird Tales	May 1927		Wikisource	PD^{L}	Lord 1976, p. 187; Herman 2006, pp. 208–209
Song of the Bossonian Archers	2	A long bow and a strong bow, and let the sky grow dark	Always Comes Evening^{A}	1957^{A}	The Scarlet Citadel (verse heading for Chapter 5)		Epigraph:^{S} The Scarlet Citadel (Lord 1976, p. 206)	Lord 1976, p. 206; Herman 2006, pp. 201, 209
The Song of The Bull-Moose			n/a	n/a			Lost^{U}	Thom, Herman & Woods, § C
Song of the Don Cossacks, A	26	Wolf-brother, wolf-lover	Always Comes Evening	1957		"A Song of the Don Cossacks"		Lord 1976, p. 187; Herman 2006, p. 209
Song of the Gallows Tree, The	24	Worn am I by the winds and the rains	Weird Tales #2	1981				Lord 1976, p. 311; Herman 2006, p. 209
Song of the Jackal, The	26	I haunt the halls where the lichen clings	Night Images	1976				Lord 1976, p. 311; Herman 2006, p. 209
Song of the Last Briton, The	16	The sea is grey in the death of day	The Ghost Ocean and Other Poems of the Supernatural	1982				Lord 1976, p. 311; Herman 2006, p. 209
Song of the Legions, A	40	The crystal gong of the silence	The Howard Collector #12	Spring 1970				Lord 1976, p. 187; Herman 2006, p. 209
Song of the Naked Lands, A	92	You lolled in gardens where breezes fanned	A Song of the Naked Lands	1973	Untitled ("You lolled in gardens where breezes fanned")		Originally untitled (Lord 1976, p. 188)	Lord 1976, p. 188; Herman 2006, p. 209
Song of the Pict	14	Wolf on the height	Always Comes Evening	1957		"Song of the Pict"	From:^{T} Men of the Shadows (Lord 1976, p. 188); Originally untitled (Lord 1976, p. 188)	Lord 1976, p. 188; Herman 2006, p. 209
Song of the Race, A	72	High on this throne sat Bran Mak Morn	Bran Mak Morn	Sep 1969	Untitled ("High on his throne sat Bran Mak Morn")		Originally untitled (Lord 1976, p. 188); A Bran Mak Morn poem	Lord 1976, p. 188; Herman 2006, p. 210
Song of the Red Stone, The	10	It shows on the breast of the Persian king	Echoes From An Iron Harp^{A}	1972^{A}	The Blood of Belshazzar		Epigraph:^{S} The Blood of Belshazzar (Lord 1976, p. 203); Verse heading of short story "The Blood of Belshazzar," starring Cormac Fitzgeoffrey	Lord 1976, p. 203; Herman 2006, pp. 210, 155
Song of the Sage, The	4	Thus spoke Scutto on the mountains in the twilight	The Collected Letters of Robert E. Howard, Volume 2: 1930-1932	Oct 2007		Wikisource	Letter:^{K} Tevis Clyde Smith; c. March 1930); PD^{L}	Herman 2006, p. 210
Song of the Werewolf Folk, A	24	Sink white fangs in the throat of Life	Etchings and Odysseys #10	1987				Lord 1976, p. 311; Herman 2006, p. 210; Howard 2008, p. x
Song of Yar Ali Khan, The	20	This is the song of Yar Ali Khan	Always Comes Evening (Underwood-Miller)	1977			An early work^{C} (Lord 1976, p. 311)	Lord 1976, p. 311; Herman 2006, p. 210
Song Out of Midian, A	24	These I will give to you, Astair: an armlet of frozen gold	Weird Tales	Apr 1930	Sang the King of Midian	Wikisource	Letter:^{K} Tevis Clyde Smith; undated)	Lord 1976, p. 188; Herman 2006, p. 210
Song Out of the East, A	22	Allah	Night Images	1976				Lord 1976, p. 311; Herman 2006, p. 210
Songs of Bastards	559	Oh, the years they pass / like a bleak jackass	Lewd Tales	1987			Letter:^{K} Tevis Clyde Smith, c. March 1929 (Herman 2006, p. 226); A play ("One of the Greatest Operas Never Yet Produced Anywhere") written entirely in verse' contains the following poems: Untitled ("I knocked upon her lattice – soft!"); Untitled ("Let us up in the hills ..."); Untitled ("Life is a lot of hooey"); Untitled ("Men are toys ...")	Herman 2006, p. 226
Sonnet of Good Cheer, A	14	Fling wide the portals, rose-lipped dawn has come	The Howard Collector #9	Spring 1967				Lord 1976, p. 188; Herman 2006, p. 211
Sonnets Out of Bedlam	Five 14-line sonnets for a total of 70 lines						A cycle of five poems: "The Singer in the Mist" (14 lines), "The Dream and the Shadow" (14 lines), "The Soul-Eater" (14 lines), "Haunting Columns" (14 lines), and "The Last Hour" (14 lines) (Herman 2006, p. 211)	Herman 2006, p. 211
Sonora to Del Rio	20	Sonora to Del Rio is a hundred barren miles	The Howard Collector #1	Summer 1961		Wikisource	Shares lines with The Grim Land (Lord 1976, p. 188); PD^{L}	Lord 1976, p. 188; Herman 2006, p. 211
Soul-Eater, The	14	I swam below the surface of a lake	Weird Tales	Aug 1937		"The Soul-Eater"	Third poem of five from the Sonnets Out of Bedlam cycle; (Herman 2006, p. 211)	Lord 1976, p. 188; Herman 2006, p. 211
The South Sea Trader			n/a	n/a			Lost^{U}	Thom, Herman & Woods, § C
Sowers of the Thunder, The	8	Iron winds and ruin and flame			last eight lines of the 15-line The Ballad of Baibars		verse heading to the story of the same name;	Herman 2006, p. 211
The spiders of weariness come on me	4	The spiders of weariness come on me	The Collected Letters of Robert E. Howard, Volume 1: 1923-1929	Jun 2007	Untitled: The spiders of weariness come on me	Wikisource	Letter:^{K} Tevis Clyde Smith, c. March 1928 (Herman 2006, p. 230); PD^{L}	Herman 2006, p. 230
Stanley Ketchell			n/a	n/a			Lost^{U}; two different drafts listed	Thom, Herman & Woods, § C
"The stars beat up from the shadowy sea"	28	The stars beat up from the shadowy sea	Always Comes Evening	1957	Heart of the Sea's Desire, The; Mate of the Sea; Untitled: "The stars beat up from the shadowy sea"	"The Heart of the Sea's Desire"	Title created by Dale Hart for an untitled version but another draft was later found with the title Mate of the Sea (Herman 2006, p. 173)	Lord 1976, p. 177; Herman 2006, p. 173
"The State of Arkansaw"	48	My name it is Sandford Burns	The Collected Letters of Robert E. Howard, Volume 1: 1923-1929	Jun 2007	Sandford Burns;	https://www.youtube.com/watch?v=_mAnoTTyGqY; https://www.youtube.com/watch?v=XIU-7G7txmo	Mnemonic reconstruction^{V} of "The State of Arkansaw"; Letter:^{K} Robert W. Gordon, February 15, 1926; NOT INCLUDED IN COLLECTED POETRY	
Stay Not From Me	39	Stay not from me, that veil	Poet's Scroll	Aug 1929	Shadow of Dreams; Untitled ("Stay not from me, that veil ...")	Wikisource	Pen name: Patrick Howard^{O} (Herman 2006, p. 202); Letter:^{K} Tevis Clyde Smith, c. December 1928 (Herman 2006, p. 202); PD^{L} [NOT to be confused with SHADOWS OF DREAMS!]	Herman 2006, p. 202
"Stay not from me, that veil ..."	39	Stay not from me, that veil	Poet's Scroll	Aug 1929	Shadow of Dreams; Stay Not From MeUntitled ("Stay not from me, that veil ...")	Wikisource	Pen name: Patrick Howard^{O} (Herman 2006, p. 202); Letter:^{K} Tevis Clyde Smith, c. December 1928 (Herman 2006, p. 202); PD^{L} [NOT to be confused with SHADOWS OF DREAMS!]	Herman 2006, p. 202
Stirring of Green Leaves, A	16	I long for the South as a man for a maid	Shadows of Dreams	1989			Letter:^{K} Tevis Clyde Smith; c. May 1930) (Herman 2006, p. 211)	Herman 2006, p. 211
Stralsund, The	5	He has rigged her and tricked her	A Rhyme of Salem Town and Other Poems	2002	Untitled ("He has rigged her and tricked her")		Tentative title^{B} (Lord 1976, p. 311)	Lord 1976, p. 311; Herman 2006, p. 211
Strange Passion	34	Ah, I know the black queens whose passions blaze	Risque Stories #1	Mar 1984	Untitled ("Ah, I know black queens ...")		Tentative title^{B} (Lord 1976, p. 311)	Lord 1976, p. 311; Herman 2006, p. 211
Strangeness			n/a	n/a			Lost^{U}	Thom, Herman & Woods, § C
Stranger, The	28	The wind blew in from seaward	Singers in the Shadows	1970				Lord 1976, p. 188; Herman 2006, p. 211
"A sturdy housewife was Mistress Brown ..."	20	A sturdy housewife was Mistress Brown	Desire and Other Erotic Poems	1989	Good Mistress Brown; Untitled ("A sturdy housewife was Mistress Brown ...")		Tentative title^{B} (Lord 1976, p. 304)	Lord 1976, p. 304; Herman 2006, p. 172
Sullivan			n/a	n/a			Lost^{U}; possibly a variation of the poem "John L. Sullivan"	Thom, Herman & Woods, § C
Summer Morn	5	Am-ra stood on a mountain height	Kull: Exile of Atlantis	Oct 2006	Untitled ("Am-ra stood on a mountain height")	Wikisource	Tentative title^{B} (Lord 1976, p. 311); PD^{L}	Lord 1976, p. 311; Herman 2006, p. 212
Surrender (1)^{N}	44	I will rise some day when the day is done	The Junto^{H} The Howard Collector #3	Aug 1929; Autumn 1962	The Road to Rest	Wikisource	PD^{L}; Conflict: Lord (1976, p. 189), The Howard Collector, 1962/Herman (2006, p. 212), The Junto, 1929	Lord 1976, p. 189; Herman 2006, p. 212
Surrender (2)^{N}	20	Open the window and let me go	Shadows of Dreams	1989			Letter:^{K} Tevis Clyde Smith; undated) (Herman 2006, p. 212)	Herman 2006, p. 212
Swamp Murder	20	Through the mists and damps	Verses in Ebony	1975				Lord 1976, p. 311; Herman 2006, p. 212
"Swift with your mitts"	8	Swift with your mitts and fast on your feet	A Rhyme of Salem Town and Other Poems	2002	Time, the Victor; Untitled ("Swift with your mitts")		Tentative title^{B} (Lord 1976, p. 312); Unfinished (Lord 1976, p. 312)	Lord 1976, p. 312; Herman 2006, p. 214
Swine			n/a	n/a			Lost^{U}	Thom, Herman & Woods, § C
Swings and Swings	56	"Swing your girl in a grape vine swing?"	The Junto^{H}	unknown (c. 1928-30)	Song for All Women, A		Howard's Foreword: Once upon a time I heard a girl make a speech; and, lo, she bid all youths to swing their girls in grape vine swings if they wished to win them.	Lord 1976, p. 311; Herman 2006, p. 212
Sword of Lal Singh, The	24	Men I have slain with naked steel	A Rhyme of Salem Town and Other Poems	2002	Untitled (Men I have slain with naked steel)		Tentative title^{B} (Lord 1976, p. 311); An early work^{C} (Lord 1976, p. 311)	Lord 1976, p. 311; Herman 2006, p. 212
Sword of Mohammed, The			The Toreador	5 July 1925				Herman 2006, p. 212
Sword Woman verse heading for Chapter 3	5	Beyond the creak of rat-gnawed beams in squalid peasant huts	n/a	n/a			Epigraph:^{S} Drums in My Ears (Lord 1976, p. 315) Never published separately (Herman 2006, p. 164)	Lord 1976, p. 315; Herman 2006, p. 164
Sword Woman verse heading for Chapter 4	4	Her sisters bend above their looms	n/a	n/a	Alternate title: verse heading for Chapter 4 of "Sword Woman"; Ballad of Dark Agnes, The;		Epigraph:^{S} (Lord 1976, p. 315) Never published separately from the story (Herman 2006, p. 152)	Lord 1976, p. 315; Herman 2006, p. 152; Thom, Herman & Woods, § B
Swords glimmered up the pass	93	Swords glimmered up the pass	The Collected Letters of Robert E. Howard, Volume 1: 1923-1929	Jun 2007	Untitled: Swords glimmered up the pass	Wikisource	Letter:^{K} Tevis Clyde Smith, c. November 1928 (Herman 2006, p. 231); PD^{L}	Herman 2006, p. 231
Symbol, The	24	Eons before Atlantean days in the time of the world's black dawn	Ariel^{[Horror]}	Autumn 1976^{[Horror]}	Untitled ("Eons before the Atlantean days ...")		Tentative title^{B} (Lord 1976, p. 311)	Lord 1976, p. 311; Herman 2006, p. 212; Howard 2008, p. x
Symbols	8	Scarce had the east grown red with dawn	Shadows of Dreams	1989			Letter:^{K} Tevis Clyde Smith, c. January 1928	
Take some honey from a cat	5	Take some honey from a cat	The Last of the Trunk Och Brev I Urval	Mar 2007	Untitled: Take some honey from a cat	Wikisource	Letter:^{K} Tevis Clyde Smith, c. August–September 1927 (Herman 2006, p. 231); PD^{L}	Herman 2006, p. 231
The Tale of Our Lives			n/a	n/a			Lost^{U}	Thom, Herman & Woods, § C
Tale the Dead Slaver Told, The	22	Dim and grey was the silent sea	Weirdbook #8	1974	The Dead Slaver's Tale			Herman 2006, p. 161; Howard 2008, p. X
The tall man answered / The tall man rose and said / The tall man said			The Last of the Trunk Och Brev I Urval	Mar 2007	from "People of the Winged Skulls," q, v.			
Tarentella	63	Heads! Heads! Heads!	The Daniel Baker Collegian^{G}	25 May 1926	Tarantella	Wikisource	PD^{L}	Lord 1976, p. 189; Herman 2006, p. 213
Tartar Raid, The	20	The snow-capped peaks of Ural shone white against the sky	A Rhyme of Salem Town and Other Poems	2002	Untitled ("The snow-capped peaks of Ural ...")		Tentative title^{B} (Lord 1976, p. 311); Unfinished (Lord 1976, p. 311)	Lord 1976, p. 211; Herman 2006, p. 213
Tavern, The	14	There stands, close by a dim, wolf-haunted wood	Singers in the Shadows	1970				Lord 1976, p. 189; Herman 2006, p. 213; Howard 2008, p. x
Tavern Song	20	Old Compass is dead and lies under the ground	The Collected Letters of Robert E. Howard, Volume 1: 1923-1929	Jun 2007		https://www.youtube.com/watch?v=tJlykbm7nfU	Mnemonic reconstruction^{V} of "Oliver Cromwell Lies Buried and Dead"; Letter:^{K} Robert W. Gordon, April 9, 1926; NOT INCLUDED IN COLLECTED POETRY	
Tell me not in coocoo numbers	4	Tell me not in coocoo numbers	The Collected Letters of Robert E. Howard, Volume 1: 1923-1929	Jun 2007	Untitled: Tell me not in coocoo numbers		Letter:^{K} Tevis Clyde Smith, c. October 1927 (Herman 2006, p. 231); From the story The Fastidious Fooey Mancucu (Herman 2006, p. 231)	Herman 2006, p. 231
Tempter, The	40	Something tapped me on the shoulder	The Cross Plains Review^{E}	18 June 1937		Wikisource	PD^{L}	Lord 1976, p. 189; Herman 2006, p. 213
"That is no land for weaklings ..."	28	That is no land for weaklings, no land for coward or fool	A Rhyme of Salem Town and Other Poems	2002	Zululand; Untitled ("That is no land for weaklings ...")		Tentative title^{B} (Lord 1976, p. 314); An early work^{C} (Lord 1976, p. 314)	Lord 1976, p. 314; Herman 2006, p. 242
That Women May Sing of Us	8	I have felt their eyes upon me	The Last of the Trunk Och Brev I Urval	Mar 2007		Wikisource	Letter:^{K} Tevis Clyde Smith; undated) (Herman 2006, p. 213); PD^{L}	Herman 2006, p. 213
Then Stein the peddler with rising joy	14	Then Stein the peddler with rising joy	The Last of the Trunk Och Brev I Urval	Mar 2007	Untitled: Then Stein the peddler with rising joy	Wikisource	Letter:^{K} Tevis Clyde Smith, c. July 1930 (Herman 2006, p. 231); PD^{L}	Herman 2006, p. 231
There are grim things did	26	There are grim things did, in the East, old kid	Chacal #1	Winter 1976	The Ballad of Naughty Nell; The Ballad of Singapore Nell; Untitled: ("There are grim things did ...")		draft from an undated letter^{K} to Tevis Clyde Smith, significantly different from the version published in CHACAL and DESIRE; the original typescript version is used for COLLECTED POETRY	Lord 1976, p. 301; Herman 2006, p. 153; Thom, Herman & Woods, § B
"There burns in me ..."	4	There burns in me no honeyed drop of love	Always Comes Evening	1957	Invective; Untitled ("There burns in me ...")	"Invective"		Lord 1976, p. 177; Herman 2006, p. 175
"There come long days ..."	21	There come long days when the soul turns sick	Fantasy Tales	Summer 1987	Outworn Story, An; Untitled ("There come long days ...")		Tentative title^{B} (Lord 1976, p. 308); British^{P} (Herman 2006, p. 184)	Lord 1976, p. 308; Herman 2006, p. 191
"There is a misty sea ..."	6	There is a misty sea beneath the earth	A Rhyme of Salem Town and Other Poems	2002	Misty Sea, A; Untitled ("There is a misty sea ...")		Tentative title^{B} (Lord 1976, p. 306)	Lord 1976, p. 306; Herman 2006, p. 185
"There is a sea and a silent moon"	16	There is a sea and a silent moon	The Ghost Ocean and Other Poems of the Supernatural	1982	Ghost Ocean, The; Untitled ("There is a sea and a silent moon")		Tentative title^{B} (Lord 1976, p. 304)	Lord 1976, p. 304; Herman 2006, p. 171
"There is a strangeness in my soul"	60	There is a strangeness in my soul	Rhymes of Death	1975	Ecstasy; Untitled ("There is a strangeness in my soul")		Tentative title^{B} (Lord 1976, p. 303); shares some stanzas with "A cringing woman's lot is hard"	Lord 1976, p. 303; Herman 2006, p. 166
There once was a wicked old elf	5 (limerick)	There once was a wicked old elf	The Last of the Trunk Och Brev I Urval	Mar 2007	Untitled: There once was a wicked old elf	Wikisource	Letter:^{K} Tevis Clyde Smith, undated (Herman 2006, p. 232); PD^{L}	Herman 2006, p. 232
"There was a thing of the shadow world"	28	There was a thing of the shadow world	The Ghost Ocean and Other Poems of the Supernatural	1982	Shadow Thing; Untitled ("There was a thing of the shadow world")		Tentative title^{B} (Lord 1976, p. 310); From:^{T} Untitled, begins "As he approached the two..." (Lord 1976, p. 310)/(Herman 2006, p. 203)	Lord 1976, p. 310; Herman 2006, p. 203
"There was a young girl from Siberia"	15	There was a young girl from Siberia	Desire and Other Erotic Poems	1989	Limericks to Spank By; Untitled ("There was a young girl from Siberia")		Tentative title^{B} (Lord 1976, p. 305); Three 5-line limericks (Herman 2006, p. 181)	Lord 1976, p. 305; Herman 2006, p. 181
"There was an old dick whose name was Stiff"	2 4-line ditties for a total of 8 lines	"There was an old dick whose name was Stiff"	The Last of the Trunk Och Brev I Urval	Mar 2007	Untitled: ("There was an old dick whose name was Stiff")		Letter:^{K} Tevis Clyde Smith, ca. March 1929; contained in the untitled story "Hatrack!"; titled with the first line in COLLECTED POETRY	
There were three lads who went their destined ways	53	There were three lads who went their destined ways	The Last of the Trunk Och Brev I Urval	Mar 2007	Untitled: There were three lads who went their destined ways	wikisource	Letter:^{K} Tevis Clyde Smith, undated (Herman 2006, p. 232); PD^{L}	Herman 2006, p. 232
"There's a bell that hangs in a hidden cave"	24	There's a bell that hangs in a hidden cave	Bran Mak Morn — The Last King	2001	Bell of Morni, The; Untitled ("There's a bell that hangs in a hidden cave")		Tentative title^{B} (Lord 1976, p. 301)	Lord 1976, p. 301; Herman 2006, p. 153; Thom, Herman & Woods, § B
"There's a calling, and a calling ..."	8	There's a calling and a calling	A Rhyme of Salem Town and Other Poems	2002	Calling to Rome, A; Untitled ()		Tentative title^{B} (Lord 1976, p. 301)	Lord 1976, p. 301; Herman 2006, p. 156; Thom, Herman & Woods, § C
There's an isle far away on the breast of the sea	24	There's an isle far away on the breast of the sea	The Last of the Trunk Och Brev I Urval	Mar 2007	Untitled: There's an isle far away on the breast of the sea	Wikisource	Letter:^{K} Tevis Clyde Smith, c. December 1928 (Herman 2006, p. 232); PD^{L}	Herman 2006, p. 232
These Things Are Gods	18	These things are gods	Unaussprechlichen Kulten #2	Jul 1992			French^{P} (Herman 2006, p. 213)	Lord 1976, p. 311; Herman 2006, p. 213
"They break from the pack ..."	24	They break from the pack and seek their own track	A Rhyme of Salem Town and Other Poems	2002	Untamed Avatars; Untitled ("They break from the pack ...")		Tentative title^{B} (Lord 1976, p. 312)	Lord 1976, p. 312; Herman 2006, p. 217
"They came to a village which lay / Within a king's domains"	27	They came to a village which lay / Within a king's domains	The Collected Letters of Robert E. Howard, Volume 1: 1923-1929	Jun 2007	The Search Untitled: ("They came to a village which lay / Within a king's domains ...")		Mnemonic reconstruction^{V} of "The Search" by Edgar Lee Masters; Letter:^{K} Robert W. Gordon, February 4, 1925; NOT INCLUDED IN COLLECTED POETRY	
"They cast her out of the court of the king ..."	44	They cast her out of the court of the king	Chacal #2	Spring 1977	Daughter of Evil; Untitled ("They cast her out of the court of the king ...")		Letter:^{K} Tevis Clyde Smith, c. September 1930 (Herman 2006, p. 160); Tentative title^{B} (Lord 1976, p. 302)	Lord 1976, p. 302; Herman 2006, p. 160
"They gave me a dollar and thirty cents ..."	30	They gave me a dollar and thirty cents when they let me outa my cell	Shadows of Dreams	1989	Song of a Fugitive Bard; Untitled ("They gave me a dollar and thirty cents ...")		Letter:^{K} Tevis Clyde Smith; c. June 1928)	Herman 2006, p. 207
They matched me up that night ...	24	They matched me up that night with a bird that was a fright	The Last of the Trunk Och Brev I Urval	Mar 2007	Untitled: ("They matched me up that night ...")	Wikisource	Letter:^{K} Tevis Clyde Smith, c. June 1928 (Herman 2006, p. 233); PD^{L}	Herman 2006, p. 233
They were there, in the distance dreaming	4	They were there, in the distance dreaming	Dear HPL: Letters, Robert E. Howard to H. P. Lovecraft, 1933-1936	2002	Untitled: They were there, in the distance dreaming		Letter:^{K} H. P. Lovecraft, April 23, 1933 (Herman 2006, p. 233)	Herman 2006, p. 233
Thing on the Roof, The	8	They lumber through the night	Echoes From An Iron Harp^{A}	1972^{A}	The Old Ones; Out of the Old Land		Justin Geoffrey^{R} (Herman 2006, pp. 213–214); This is the published title, The Old Ones was the draft title, from The Thing on the Roof(Herman 2006, p. 214)	Lord 1976, p. 206; Herman 2006, pp. 191, 213–214
This is a young world		This is a young world	The Right Hook,^{I} vol. 1, #3	1925	Untitled: This is a young world			Herman 2006, p. 233
"This is the tale of a nameless fight"	1,046	This is the tale of a nameless fight	The Ballad of King Geraint; Untitled: ("This is the tale of a nameless fight")	1989	The Ballad of King Geraint		Tentative title^{B} (Lord 1976, p. 301); Title provided by Lenore Preece (Herman 2006, p. 153); Letter:^{K} Harold Preece, January 4, 1930 (Herman 2006, p. 153)	Lord 1976, p. 301; Herman 2006, p. 153; Thom, Herman & Woods, § B
"This is the tale the Kaffirs tell ..."	28	This is the tale the Kaffirs tell as the tints of twilight melt	Fantasy Tales	Winter 1983	Zulu Lord, The; Untitled ("This is the tale the Kaffirs tell ...")		Tentative title^{B} (Lord 1976, p. 314); British^{P} (Herman 2006, p. 242)	Lord 1976, p. 314; Herman 2006, p. 242
Thomas Fitzgerald, Shane O'Neill ...)	24	Thomas Fitzgerald, Shane O'Neill			Black Harps in the Hills Untitled: ("Thomas Fitzgerald, Shane O'Neill")		A shorter version of the 53-line "Black Harps in the Hills"; Letter:^{K} Harold Preece, c. March 1929, a version (Herman 2006, p. 154)	Lord 1976, p. 299; Herman 2006, p. 154; Thom, Herman & Woods, § B
Thor	8	I stand / Back of the North Wind	The Last of the Trunk Och Brev I Urval	Mar 2007		Wikisource	Letter:^{K} Tevis Clyde Smith; June 23, 1926) (Herman 2006, p. 214); PD^{L}	Herman 2006, p. 214
Thor's Son	24	Serpent prow on the Afric coast	The Howard Collector #11	Spring 1969	The Rhyme of the Viking Path		Letter:^{K} Tevis Clyde Smith; c. May 1930) (Herman 2006, p. 214)	Lord 1976, p. 189; Herman 2006, p. 214
"Thorfinn, Thorfinn, where have you been?"	36	Thorfinn, Thorfinn, where have you been?	Weirdbook #13	1978	Return of the Sea-Farer, The; Untitled: ("Thorfinn, Thorfinn, where have you been?")			Lord 1976, p. 309; Herman 2006, p. 196
Thousand Years Ago, A	21	I was a chief of the Chatagai	Night Images	1976	Untitled ("I was a chief of the Chatagai")		Tentative title^{B} (Lord 1976, p. 311)	Lord 1976, p. 311; Herman 2006, p. 214
"A thousand years ago great Genghis reigned"	4	A thousand years ago great Genghis reigned	A Rhyme of Salem Town and Other Poems	2002	Krakorum; Untitled ("A thousand years ago great Genghis reigned")		Tentative title^{B} (Lord 1976, p. 305); An early work^{C} (Lord 1976, p. 305); An introduction by Howard states that he was 17 when he wrote this poem (Herman 2006, p. 178)	Lord 1976, p. 305; Herman 2006, p. 178
"A thousand years, perhaps, have come and gone"	32	A thousand years, perhaps, have come and gone	Up John Kane! and Other Poems	1977	When Death Drops Her Veil; Untitled ("A thousand years, perhaps, have come and gone")		Tentative title^{B} (Lord 1976, p. 313)	Lord 1976, p. 313; Herman 2006, p. 238
Three Sketches	88	You stole niggers, John Brown	THE COLLECTED LETTERS OF ROBERT E. HOWARD, VOLUME 2: 1930–1932	2007			Letter:^{K} Tevis Clyde Smith; ca. May 1932)Herman 2006, p. 214; A cycle of three poems: "John Brown" (24 lines), "Abe Lincoln" (34 lines), and "John Kelley" (30 lines)	
Through the mists of silence there came a sound	9	Through the mists of silence there came a sound	Yesteryear #4	Oct 1989	Untitled: Through the mists of silence there came a sound		Letter:^{K} Tevis Clyde Smith, c. February 1929 (Herman 2006, p. 233)	Herman 2006, p. 233
Throw out that Red!	4	"'Throw out that Red!' they cried ..."	The Collected Letters Of Robert E. Howard, Volume 1: 1923–1929	2007		Untitled: ("'Throw out that Red!' they cried ...")		Letter:^{K} Tevis Clyde Smith, c. March 1929
Thus Spake Sven the Fool	14	The night is dark; the fenlands lie asleep	Singers in the Shadows	1970				Lord 1976, p. 189
Tide, The	30	Thus in my mood I love you	Omniumgathum	October 1976	To a Woman (3)^{N}; Untitled ("Thus in my mood I love you")		Pen name: Patrick Howard^{O} (Lord 1976, p. 299) Cited in the movie The Whole Wide World. There's an original REH typescript, titled "To a Woman", credited "Patrick Howard." The title "The Tide" could be Glenn Lord's, to prevent confusion with previously published poems with the same title; SELECTED POEMS dropped the titles and just goes with the first line; the last two lines of "The Tide" are not included in the known versions of "To A Woman (3)." || Herman 2006, p. 214	
Tides	20	I am weary of birth and battle	Contemporary Verse	Sep 1929		Wikisource	PD^{L}	Herman 2006, p. 214
Tiger Girl	12	Your eyes, as scintillant as jet	Omniumgathum	1976				Lord 1976, p. 311; Herman 2006, p. 214
Time, the Victor	8	Swift with your mitts and fast on your feet	A Rhyme of Salem Town and Other Poems	2002	Untitled ("Swift with your mitts")		Tentative title^{B} (Lord 1976, p. 312); Unfinished (Lord 1976, p. 312)	Lord 1976, p. 312; Herman 2006, p. 214
The times, the times stride on apace and fast	14	The times, the times stride on apace and fast	The New Howard Reader #5	Mar 1999	The Times, The Times Stride on Apace and Fast; Untitled: The times, the times stride on apace and fast		Written on the endpapers of a copy of Beau Geste (Herman 2006, p. 233)	Herman 2006, p. 233
Timur-il-lang					Timur-lang			Lord 1976, p. 189; Herman 2006, p. 214
Timur-lang	6	The warm wind blows through the waving grain	The Howard Collector #5	Summer 1964	Timur-il-lang		Letter:^{K} Harold Preece; undated) (Herman 2006, p. 215); Shares lines with The Sign of the Sickle (Herman 2006, p. 215)	Lord 1976, p. 189; Herman 2006, p. 215
"Tingle, jingle, dingle, tingle ..."	23	Tingle, jungle, dingle, tingle, hear my brazen tones	A Rhyme of Salem Town and Other Poems	2002	Little Bell of Brass; Untitled ("Tingle, jingle, dingle, tingle ...")		Tentative title^{B} (Lord 1976, p. 305)	Lord 1976, p. 305; Herman 2006, p. 182
To a Blasé Lady			n/a	n/a			Lost^{U}	Thom, Herman & Woods, § C
To a Certain Cultured Woman	44	Open the window; the jungle calls	The Last of the Trunk Och Brev I Urval	Mar 2007	To Certain Cultured Women	Wikisource	Letter:^{K} Tevis Clyde Smith; undated) (Herman 2006, p. 215); PD^{L}	Herman 2006, p. 215
To a Friend	14	I toiled beside you in the galley's chains	Verses in Ebony	1975			Pen name: Patrick Howard^{O} (Lord 1976, p. 299)	Lord 1976, p. 299; Herman 2006, p. 215
To a Kind Missionary Woiker	10	Lissen, lady, youse can't do me nuttin'	A Rhyme of Salem Town and Other Poems	2002				Lord 1976, p. 312; Herman 2006, p. 215
To a Modern Young Lady	44	Ages ago I came to woo			To a Woman ("Ages ago ...") (1)^{N}		Similar to To a Woman, but not identical, with a different final quatrain	Herman 2006, p. 215
To a Nameless Woman	28	Hard shadows break along the smoky hills	Shadows of Dreams	1989			Letter:^{K} Tevis Clyde Smith; c. November 1928) (Herman 2006, p. 215)	Herman 2006, p. 215
To a Roman Woman	28	Gleaming ivory, black basalt	The Last of the Trunk Och Brev I Urval	Mar 2007		Wikisource	Letter:^{K} Tevis Clyde Smith; undated) (Herman 2006, p. 215); PD^{L}	Herman 2006, p. 215
To a Woman (1)^{N}	44	Ages ago I came to woo	The Ghost Ocean and Other Poems of the Supernatural	1982	To a Modern Young Lady	Wikisource	another typescript version that has a different last quatrain was included in the proposed poetry collection IMAGES OUT OF THE SKY by REH, TCS, and Lenore Preece, titled "To a Modern Young Lady"	Lord 1976, p. 312; Herman 2006, p. 215
To a Woman (2)^{N}	12	Through fathoms deep you sink me in the mould	Modern American Poetry	1933		Wikisource	PD^{L}	Lord 1976, p. 189; Herman 2006, p. 215; Howard 2008, p. x
To a Woman (3)^{N}	30	Thus in my mood I love you			The Tide; Untitled ("Thus in my mood I love you")		Very similar to THE TIDE—the last two lines of "Tide" have been truncated; some punctuational differences, one word changed, and third and fourth lines of each verse are combined in a single line	Lord 1976, p. 299; Herman 2006, p. 216
To All Evangelists			The Ghost Ocean and Other Poems of the Supernatural	1982	Flood, The			Herman 2006, p. 169
To All Lords of Commerce	20	Go down your little byway	Verses in Ebony	1975	To All the Lords of Commerce			Lord 1976, p. 312; Herman 2006, p. 216
To All Sophisticates	48	You who with pallid wine still toast	The Ghost Ocean and Other Poems of the Supernatural	1982			Pen name: Patrick Howard^{O} (Lord 1976, p. 299)	Lord 1976, p. 299; Herman 2006, p. 216
To an Angry Woman			n/a	n/a			Lost^{U}	Thom, Herman & Woods, § C
To an Earth-Bound Soul	28	Villon, Villon, your name is stone	The Grim Land and Others	1976	To an Earth Bound Soul			Lord 1976, p. 312; Herman 2006, p. 216
To Certain Cultured Women	44	Open the window; the jungle calls	The Last of the Trunk Och Brev I Urval	Mar 2007	To a Certain Cultured Woman	Wikisource	Letter:^{K} Tevis Clyde Smith; undated) (Herman 2006, p. 215); PD^{L}	Herman 2006, p. 215
To Certain Orthodox Brethren	18	You say all things were made for you - then prove it, on your crowns	The Howard Collector #12	Spring 1970				Lord 1976, p. 190; Herman 2006, p. 216
To Harry the Oliad Men	12	When the first winds of summer the roses brought	Omniumgathum	1976	Untitled ("When the first winds of summer ...")		Tentative title^{B} (Lord 1976, p. 312)	Lord 1976, p. 312; Herman 2006, p. 216
To Lyle Saxon	28		Shadows of Dreams	1989			Letter:^{K} Tevis Clyde Smith; undated) (Herman 2006, p. 216)	Herman 2006, p. 216
To Moderns	47	Little poets, little poets	A Rhyme of Salem Town and Other Poems	2002			Pen name: Patrick Mac Conaire Howard^{O} (Lord 1976, p. 299)	Lord 1976, p. 299; Herman 2006, p. 216
To One Turned Faithless			n/a	n/a			Lost^{U}	Thom, Herman & Woods, § C
To One Who Understands			n/a	n/a			Lost^{U}	Thom, Herman & Woods, § C
To the Contended	20	Bide by the fluted iron walls	The Collected Letters of Robert E. Howard, Volume 1: 1923-1929	Jun 2007		Wikisource	Letter:^{K} Tevis Clyde Smith; c. April 1929) (Herman 2006, p. 216); PD^{L}	Herman 2006, p. 216
To the Evangelists	14	Rise in your haughty pulpits; preach with a godly ire	The Junto^{H}	Dec 1928	The Flood			Lord 1976, p. 312; Herman 2006, p. 216
To the Old Men	20	Age sat on his high throne	The Junto^{H} / The Howard Collector	Sep 1928 / Spring 1971	Age (two slightly variant versions)		Conflict:^{M} Lord (1976, p. 169), The Howard Collector, 1971/Herman (2006, p. 148), The Junto, 1928	Lord 1976, p. 169; Herman 2006, p. 148; Thom, Herman & Woods, § A
To the Stylists	4	Hammer your verses, file your songs	A Rhyme of Salem Town and Other Poems	2002				Lord 1976, p. 312; Herman 2006, p. 216
Toast to the British! Damn their souls to Hell	6	Toast to the British! Damn their souls to Hell	The Last of the Trunk Och Brev I Urval	Mar 2007	Untitled: Toast to the British! Damn their souls to Hell	Wikisource	Letter:^{K} Tevis Clyde Smith, c. August–September 1927 (Herman 2006, p. 233); PD^{L}	Herman 2006, p. 233
Today	24	I dreamed of a woman straight as a spear	The Grim Land and Others	1976			Pen name: Patrick Howard^{O} (Lord 1976, p. 299)	Lord 1976, p. 299; Herman 2006, p. 216
Tom Thumb Moider Mystery, The	8	Harry the Fourth was a godly king	n/a	n/a			Letter:^{K} Tevis Clyde Smith; c. May 1932) (Herman 2006, p. 217); Epigraph:^{S} The Tom Thumb Murder Mystery (Herman 2006, p. 217); verse heading—never published separately (Herman 2006, p. 217)	Herman 2006, p. 217
Tommy's Gone To Hilo	16	Tommy's gone and I'll go too!	The Collected Letters of Robert E. Howard, Volume 1: 1923-1929	Jun 2007		https://www.youtube.com/watch?v=fHyNvQJBjrQ; https://www.youtube.com/watch?v=3aSwYog4mY0	Mnemonic reconstruction^{V} Letter:^{K} Robert W. Gordon, March 17, 1927; NOT INCLUDED IN COLLECTED POETRY	
The Tool Dresser			n/a	n/a			Lost^{U}	Thom, Herman & Woods, § C
"Topaz seas and laughing skies"	4	Topaz seas and laughing skies	A Rhyme of Salem Town and Other Poems	2002	Sea-Chant; Untitled ("Topaz seas and laughing skies")		Tentative title^{B} (Lord 1976, p. 310)	Lord 1976, p. 310; Herman 2006, p. 202
Toper	4	Toil, cares, annoyances all fade away	The Last of the Trunk Och Brev I Urval	Mar 2007		Wikisource	Letter:^{K} Tevis Clyde Smith; June 23, 1926) (Herman 2006, p. 217); PD^{L}	Herman 2006, p. 217
Tower of Zukala, The	48	Far and behind the Eastern wind	A Rhyme of Salem Town and Other Poems	2002				Lord 1976, p. 312; Herman 2006, p. 217
The towers stand recorders	16(?)	The towers stand recorders	The Robert E. Howard Foundation Newsletter, vol. 1, #2	Nov 2007	Untitled: Builders, The (3) ^{N}			Herman 2006, p. 156
Trail of Gold, The	8	Come with me to the Land of Sunrise	A Rhyme of Salem Town and Other Poems	2002	Untitled ("Come with me to the Land of Sunrise")		Tentative title^{B} (Lord 1976, p. 312); An early work^{C} (Lord 1976, p. 312)	Lord 1976, p. 312; Herman 2006, p. 217
Trail's End	4	Ho, for a trail that is bloody and long	A Rhyme of Salem Town and Other Poems	2002	Untitled ("Ho, for a trail that is bloody and long!")		Tentative title^{B} (Lord 1976, p. 312); Possibly incomplete (Lord 1976, p. 312); From:^{T} Originally embodied as an untitled verse in an untitled story ("As he approached the two ...") (Lord 1976, p. 312)	Lord 1976, p. 312; Herman 2006, p. 217
"Tread not where stony deserts hold"	4	Tread not where stony deserts hold	Dark Things	1971	Children of the Night, The The House in the Oaks		Third of the three verses from "The House In The Oaks" (with "An Open Window" and "Arkham"). Originally from an early draft of "The Children of the Night", in which it was attributed to fictitious poet Justin Geoffrey. Replaced in the final version with two lines from "The Gates of Damascus" by James Flecker, this poem was added by Derleth to his version of "The House in the Oaks"; titled with the first line in COLLECTED POETRY. Herman 2006, p. 157	Herman 2006, p. 157; Thom, Herman & Woods, § C
"The tribes of men rise up and pass"	4	The tribes of men rise up and pass	Weirdbook #13	1978	Only a Shadow on the Grass; Untitled ("The tribes of men rise up and pass")		Tentative title^{B} (Lord 1976, p. 308)	Lord 1976, p. 308; Herman 2006, p. 190
Tribute to the Sportsmanship of the Fans, A	17	Headlock, hammerlock, toss him on his bean again	The Collected Letters of Robert E. Howard, Volume 2: 1930-1932	Oct 2007		Wikisource	Letter:^{K} Tevis Clyde Smith; c. March 1930) (Herman 2006, p. 217); PD^{L}	Herman 2006, p. 217
"'Turn out the light.' I raised a willing hand"	14	"Turn out the light." I raised a willing hand	Desire and Other Erotic Poems	1989	Desire; Untitled ("'Turn out the light.' I raised a willing hand")		Tentative title^{B} (Lord 1976, p. 303)	Lord 1976, p. 303; Herman 2006, p. 162
"'Twas twice a hundred centuries ago"	9	Twas twice a hundred centuries ago	A Rhyme of Salem Town and Other Poems	2002	Now and Then; Untitled ("'Twas twice a hundred centuries ago")		Tentative title^{B} (Lord 1976, p. 308); Unfinished (Lord 1976, p. 308)	Lord 1976, p. 308; Herman 2006, pp. 188–189
Twilight on Stonehenge	14	Great columns loom against the brooding sky	Shadows of Dreams	1989			Letter:^{K} Tevis Clyde Smith; August 21, 1926) (Herman 2006, p. 217)	Herman 2006, p. 217
Twilight Striding O'er the Mountain ^{N}	7	Twilight striding o'er the mountain	The Right Hook,^{I} vol. 1, #3	1925	L'Envoi (3)			Herman 2006, p. 180
Twin Gates, The	8	The gates of Hades stand ajar	Singers in the Shadows	1970				Lord 1976, p. 190; Herman 2006, p. 217
Two Men	48	Two men stood in the gates of day	The Ghost Ocean and Other Poems of the Supernatural	1982			Pen name: Patrick Howard^{O} (Lord 1976, p. 299)	Lord 1976, p. 299; Herman 2006, p. 217
"Under the grim San Saba hills"	60	Under the grim San Saba hills	A Rhyme of Salem Town and Other Poems	2002	The Lost Mine; Lost San Saba Mine, The; Untitled: ("Under the grim San Saba hills")		Letter:^{K} H. P. Lovecraft, April 23, 1933 (Herman 2006, p. 182)	Lord 1976, p. 305; Herman 2006, p. 182
Universe	17	My face may be a Universe peopled by billions and billions	Weird Tales #294	Fall 1989			Tentative title^{B} (Lord 1976, p. 312)	Lord 1976, p. 312; Herman 2006, p. 217
Untamed Avatars	24	They break from the pack and seek their own track	A Rhyme of Salem Town and Other Poems	2002	Untitled ("They break from the pack ...")		Tentative title^{B} (Lord 1976, p. 312)	Lord 1976, p. 312; Herman 2006, p. 217
Untitled ("Across the wastes of No Man's Land")	28	Across the wastes of No Man's Land, the grey-clad slayers came	A Rhyme of Salem Town and Other Poems	2002	No Man's Land		Tentative title^{B} (Lord 1976, p. 308)	Lord 1976, p. 308; Herman 2006, p. 188
Untitled Actor, The	12	I am an actor and have been an actor from birth	A Rhyme of Salem Town and Other Poems	2002	Actor, The; Untitled (I am an actor ...")		Tentative title^{B} (Lord 1976, p. 300)	Lord 1976, p. 300; Herman 2006, p. 147; Thom, Herman & Woods, § A
Untitled ("Adam's loins were mountains")	40	Adam's loins were mountains	The Collected Letters of Robert E. Howard, Volume 1: 1923-1929	Jun 2007		Wikisource	Letter:^{K} Tevis Clyde Smith, c. November 1928 (Herman 2006, p. 217); PD^{L}	Herman 2006, p. 217
Untitled ("Adventure, I have followed your beck")	21	Adventure, I have followed your beck	Omniumgathum	1976	Adventure(1)^{N}		Tentative title^{B} (Lord 1976, p. 300); An early work^{C} (Lord 1976, p. 300)	Lord 1976, p. 300; Herman 2006, p. 147; Thom, Herman & Woods, § A
Untitled (Adventures)	8	Scarlet and gold are the stars tonight	The Cross Plainsman	August 2004 (last four lines only) / The Collected Letters of Robert E. Howard, Volume 1: 1923-1929 (first full appearance)	Adventures; Untitled: Scarlet and gold are the stars tonight	Wikisource	Letter:^{K} Tevis Clyde Smith, ca. November 1928 (Herman 2006, p. 148); PD^{L}	Herman 2006, p. 148; Thom, Herman & Woods, § A
Untitled ("After the trumps are sounded")	8	After the trumps are sounded	The Last of the Trunk Och Brev I Urval	Mar 2007		Wikisource	Letter:^{K} Tevis Clyde Smith, c. September 1929 (Herman 2006, p. 218); PD^{L}	Herman 2006, p. 218
Untitled ("Against the blood red moon a tower stands")	8 lines, plus a prose introduction	Against the blood red moon a tower stands	The Last of the Trunk Och Brev I Urval	Mar 2007		Wikisource	Letter:^{K} Tevis Clyde Smith, c. Aug/Sep 1927 (Herman 2006, p. 218); PD^{L}	Herman 2006, p. 218
Untitled ("The ages stride on golden feet")	6	The ages stride on golden feet	A Rhyme of Salem Town and Other Poems	2002	Ages Stride on Golden Feet, The		Tentative title^{B} (Lord 1976, p. 300)	Lord 1976, p. 300; Herman 2006, p. 148; Thom, Herman & Woods, § A
Untitled ("Ah, I know black queens whose passions blaze")	34	Ah, I know black queens whose passions blaze	Risque Stories #1	Mar 1984	Strange Passion		Tentative title^{B} (Lord 1976, p. 311)	Lord 1976, p. 311; Herman 2006, p. 211
Untitled ("Ah, the rover hides in Aves when he runs")	4	Ah, the rover hides in Aves when he runs	A Rhyme of Salem Town and Other Poems	2002	O the Brave Sea-Rover		Tentative title^{B} (Lord 1976, p. 308); An early work^{C} (Lord 1976, p. 308)	Lord 1976, p. 308; Herman 2006, p. 189
Untitled ("Ah, those were glittering, jeweled days")	12	Ah, those were glittering, jeweled days	Night Images	1976	Days of Glory		Tentative title^{B} (Lord 1976, p. 302)	Lord 1976, p. 302; Herman 2006, p. 161
Untitled Alien	16	My brothers are blond and calm of speech	Verses in Ebony	1975	Alien; Untitled ("My brothers are blond and calm of speech")		Tentative title^{B}	Lord 1976, p. 300; Herman 2006, pp. 148–149; Thom, Herman & Woods, § A
Untitled: All Hallows Eve	18	Now anthropoid and leprous shadows lope	Amazing Stories	Mar 1986	Untitled: ("Now anthropoid and leprous shadows lope")		Tentative title^{B} (Lord 1976, p. 300)	Lord 1976, p. 300; Herman 2006, p. 149; Thom, Herman & Woods, § A
Untitled ("All is pose and artifice")	4	All is pose and artifice	A Rhyme of Salem Town and Other Poems	2002	Artifice		Tentative title^{B} (Lord 1976, p. 300)	(Lord 1976, p. 300); Herman 2006, p. 150; Thom, Herman & Woods, § A
Untitled ("All the crowd")	20	All the crowd	The Last of the Trunk Och Brev I Urval	Mar 2007		Wikisource	Letter:^{K} Tevis Clyde Smith, October 9, 1925 (Herman 2006, p. 218); PD^{L}	Herman 2006, p. 218
Untitled ("Along the road that leads to Hell")	28	Along the road that leads to Hell	Singers in the Shadows	1970	Road to Hell, The	Wikisource	Lines 1-4 similar to lines 69-72 of The Dust Dance (version 1) (Lord 1976, p. 184); PD^{L}	Lord 1976, p. 184; Herman 2006, p. 198
Untitled ("Am-ra stood on a mountain height")	5	Am-ra stood on a mountain height	Kull: Exile of Atlantis	Oct 2006	Summer Morn	Wikisource	Tentative title^{B} (Lord 1976, p. 311); PD^{L}	Lord 1976, p. 311; Herman 2006, p. 21
Untitled ("The ancient boast, the ancient song")	12	The ancient boast, the ancient song	A Rhyme of Salem Town and Other Poems	2002	The House of Gael		Tentative title^{B} (Lord 1976, p. 307)	Lord 1976, p. 307; Herman 2006, p. 174
Untitled ("And Bill, he looked at me ...")		And Bill, he looked at me ...	The Right Hook^{I} vol. 1, #2	1925				Herman 2006, p. 218
Untitled ("And Dempsey climbed into the ring")	6	And Dempsey climbed into the ring and the crowd	The Collected Letters of Robert E. Howard, Volume 1: 1923-1929	Jun 2007	introduced with the line "In Carl S.'s style" (presumably Sandberg)	Wikisource	Letter:^{K} Tevis Clyde Smith, July 16, 1925 (Herman 2006, p. 218); PD^{L}	Herman 2006, p. 218
Untitled ("And there were lethal women, flaming ice and fire")	8	And there were lethal women, flaming ice and fire	Yesteryear #4	Oct 1989			Letter:^{K} Tevis Clyde Smith, c. February 1929 (Herman 2006, p. 219)	Herman 2006, pp. 218–219
Untitled: Artifice	4	All is pose and artifice	A Rhyme of Salem Town and Other Poems	2002	Untitled: ("All is pose and artifice")		Tentative title^{B} (Lord 1976, p. 300)	(Lord 1976, p. 300); Herman 2006, p. 150; Thom, Herman & Woods, § A
Untitled ("As a great spider grows to monstrous girth")	14	As a great spider grows to monstrous girth	A Rhyme of Salem Town and Other Poems	2002	Ju-ju Doom		Tentative title^{B} (Lord 1976, p. 307)	Lord 1976, p. 307; Herman 2006, p. 176
Untitled ("As I rode down to Lincoln town beneath a copper moon")	4	As I rode down to Lincoln town beneath a copper moon	A Rhyme of Salem Town and Other Poems	2002	As I Rode Down to Lincoln Town		Tentative title^{B} (Lord 1976, p. 300)	Lord 1976, p. 300; Herman 2006, p. 150; Thom, Herman & Woods, § A
Untitled: As I Rode Down to Lincoln Town	4	As I rode down to Lincoln town beneath a copper moon	A Rhyme of Salem Town and Other Poems	2002	Untitled: ("As I rode down to Lincoln town beneath a copper moon")		Tentative title^{B} (Lord 1976, p. 300)	Lord 1976, p. 300; Herman 2006, p. 150; Thom, Herman & Woods, § A
Untitled ("As I went down to Salem town, I met good Mistress Meek")	74	As I went down to Salem town, I met good Mistress Meek	A Rhyme of Salem Town and Other Poems	2002	A Rhyme of Salem Town		Tentative title^{B} (Lord 1976, p. 309)	Lord 1976, p. 309; Herman 2006, p. 197
Untitled ("As you dance upon the air")	7	As you dance upon the air	A Rhyme of Salem Town and Other Poems	2002			Incomplete, only the final seven lines survive (Lord 1976, p. 312)	Lord 1976, p. 312; Herman 2006, p. 219
Untitled ("At the Inn of the Gory Dagger")	56	At the Inn of the Gory Dagger, with nothing to ...	The Last of the Trunk Och Brev I Urval	Mar 2007		Wikisource	Letter:^{K} Tevis Clyde Smith, c. February 1929 (Herman 2006, p. 219); PD^{L}	Herman 2006, pp. 218–219
Untitled ("Away in the dusty barracoon")	88	Away in the dusty barracoon	A Rhyme of Salem Town and Other Poems	2002	Cornish Jack		Tentative title^{B} (Lord 1976, p. 302)	Lord 1976, p. 302; Herman 2006, p. 159; Thom, Herman & Woods, § C
Untitled Baal	57	My name is Baal; I walked the earth of yore	A Rhyme of Salem Town and Other Poems	2002	Untitled ("My name is Baal; I walked the earth of yore")		Tentative title^{B} (Lord 1976, p. 301)	Lord 1976, p. 301; Herman 2006, p. 151; Thom, Herman & Woods, § B
Untitled: Baal-pteor	6	High on his throne Baal-pteor sat	A Rhyme of Salem Town and Other Poems	2002	Untitled: ("High on his throne Baal-pteor sat")		Tentative title^{B} (Lord 1976, p. 301)	Lord 1976, p. 301; Herman 2006, p. 151; Thom, Herman & Woods, § B
Untitled: Babylon	16	For I have seen the lizards crawl	Always Comes Evening	1957	Untitled: ("For I have seen the lizards crawl")	"Babylon"	Originally untitled (Lord 1976, p. 171)	Lord 1976, p. 171; Herman 2006, p. 152; Thom, Herman & Woods, § B
Untitled: A Ballad of Beer	28	I was once, I declare, a grog-shop man	Shadows of Dreams	1989	Untitled: ("I was once, I declare, a grog-shop man")		Letter:^{K} Tevis Clyde Smith, c. July 1930 (Herman 2006, p. 152); Originally untitled (Herman 2006, p. 152)	Herman 2006, p. 152; Thom, Herman & Woods, § B
Untitled: "The Ballad of King Geraint"	1,046	This is the tale of a nameless fight	The Ballad of King Geraint	1989	Untitled: ("This is the tale of a nameless fight")		Tentative title^{B} (Lord 1976, p. 301); Title provided by Lenore Preece (Herman 2006, p. 153); Letter:^{K} Harold Preece, January 4, 1930 (Herman 2006, p. 153)	Lord 1976, p. 301; Herman 2006, p. 153; Thom, Herman & Woods, § B
Untitled: The Ballad of Singapore Nell—draft	44	There are grim things did	The Last of the Trunk Och Brev I Urval	Mar 2007	Untitled: ("There are grim things did")		Letter:^{K} Tevis Clyde Smith, undated (Herman 2006, p. 231); From a draft of The Ballad of Singapore Nell (Herman 2006, p. 231)	Herman 2006, p. 231
Untitled: The Bandit	31	Out of the Texas desert, over the Rio Grande	A Rhyme of Salem Town and Other Poems	2002	Untitled: ("Out of the Texas desert")		Tentative title^{B} (Lord 1976, p. 301); An early work^{C} (Lord 1976, p. 301)	Lord 1976, p. 301; Herman 2006, p. 153; Thom, Herman & Woods, § B
Untitled: The Baron and the Wench	20	The baron quaffed a draught of wine	A Rhyme of Salem Town and Other Poems	2002	Untitled: ("The baron quaffed a draught of wine")		Tentative title^{B} (Lord 1976, p. 301); Unfinished (Lord 1976, p. 301)/(Herman 2006, p. 153)	Lord 1976, p. 301; Herman 2006, p. 153; Thom, Herman & Woods, § B
Untitled: ("The Baron of Fenland ...")	19	The Baron of Fenland ...	American and European Manuscripts and Printed Books	19 December 1986			Letter:^{K} Tevis Clyde Smith, c. September 1927 (Herman 2006, p. 219); Also written on the endpapers of a copy of Beau Geste (Herman 2006, p. 219)	Herman 2006, p. 219
Untitled: ("The baron quaffed a draught of wine")	20	The baron quaffed a draught of wine	A Rhyme of Salem Town and Other Poems	2002	The Baron and the Wench		Tentative title^{B} (Lord 1976, p. 301); Unfinished (Lord 1976, p. 301)/(Herman 2006, p. 153)	Lord 1976, p. 301; Herman 2006, p. 153; Thom, Herman & Woods, § B
Untitled: ("A beggar, singing without")	14	A beggar, singing without	The Last of the Trunk Och Brev I Urval	Mar 2007			Excerpted from the verse play "Bastards All." Letter:^{K} Tevis Clyde Smith, c. March 1929 (Herman 2006, p. 219)	Herman 2006, p. 219
Untitled: The Bell of Morni	24	There's a bell that hangs in a hidden cave	Bran Mak Morn — The Last King	2001	Untitled: ("There's a bell that hangs in a hidden cave")		Tentative title^{B} (Lord 1976, p. 301)	Lord 1976, p. 301; Herman 2006, p. 153; Thom, Herman & Woods, § B
Untitled: ("Bill Boozy was a pirate bold")	8	Bill Boozy was a pirate bold	The Last of the Trunk Och Brev I Urval	Mar 2007		Wikisource	Letter:^{K} Tevis Clyde Smith, c. July 30, 1923 (Herman 2006, p. 217); PD^{L}	Herman 2006, p. 219
Untitled: Black Michael's Story	22	The moon above the Kerry hills			Retribution; The Song of Murtagh O'Brien; Untitled: ("The moon above the Kerry hills")			Herman 2006, p. 154; Thom, Herman & Woods, § B
Untitled: ("Brazen thewed giant of a grimmer Age")		Brazen thewed giant of a grimmer Age	The Robert E. Howard Foundation Newsletter, vol. 1, #2	Nov 2007			Unfinished (Herman 2006, p. 220)	Herman 2006, p. 220
Untitled: ("The broken walls of Babel")	10	The broken walls of Babel rear	A Rhyme of Salem Town and Other Poems	2002	The Broken Walls of Babel		Tentative title^{B} (Lord 1976, p. 301)	Lord 1976, p. 301; Herman 2006, p. 155; Thom, Herman & Woods, § B
Untitled: The Builders (3)	16(?)	The towers stand recorders	The Robert E. Howard Foundation Newsletter, vol. 1, #2	Nov 2007	Untitled: ("The towers stand recorders")			Herman 2006, p. 156
Untitled: But the Hills Were Ancient Then	24	Now is a summer come out of the sea	Amra (vol. 2, no. 8)	Nov-December 1959	Untitled: ("Now is a summer come out of the sea")	Wikisource	Originally untitled (Lord 1976, p. 171); Title created by George Scithers (Herman 2006, p. 156); PD^{L}	Lord 1976, p. 171; Herman 2006, p. 156; Thom, Herman & Woods, § B
Untitled: ("By old Abie Goldstein's pawn shop")	8	By old Abie Goldstein's pawn shop where the...	The Last of the Trunk Och Brev I Urval	Mar 2007		Wikisource	Letter:^{K} Tevis Clyde Smith, c. March 1929 (Herman 2006, p. 220); Parody of "On the Road to Mandalay" by Rudyard Kipling. PD^{L}	Herman 2006, p. 220
Untitled: A Calling to Rome	8	There's a calling and a calling and a calling	A Rhyme of Salem Town and Other Poems	2002	Untitled ("There's a calling and a calling and a calling")		Tentative title^{B} (Lord 1976, p. 301)	Lord 1976, p. 301; Herman 2006, p. 156; Thom, Herman & Woods, § C
Untitled: The Call of Pan	14	My heart is a silver drum tonight	Shadows of Dreams	1989	Untitled: ("My heart is a silver drum tonight")		Letter:^{K} Tevis Clyde Smith, c. November 1928 (Herman 2006, p. 156)	The Call of PanHerman 2006, p. 156; Thom, Herman & Woods, § C
Untitled: The Champ	20	The champion sneered, the crowds they jeered	Robert E. Howard Fight Magazine #1	Sep 1990	Untitled: ("The champion sneered")		Tentative title^{B} (Lord 1976, p. 302)	Lord 1976, p. 302; Herman 2006, p. 157; Thom, Herman & Woods, § C
Untitled: ("The champion sneered")	20	The champion sneered, the crowds they jeered	Robert E. Howard Fight Magazine #1	Sep 1990	The Champ		Tentative title^{B} (Lord 1976, p. 302)	Lord 1976, p. 302; Herman 2006, p. 157; Thom, Herman & Woods, § C
Untitled: Chant of the White Beard	8	O'er lakes agleam the old gods dream	Always Comes Evening	1957	Untitled: ("O'er lakes agleam the old gods dream")		From:^{T} Men of the Shadows (Lord 1976, p. 172); Originally untitled (Lord 1976, p. 172); From:^{T} Men of the Shadows (Herman 2006, p. 157)	Lord 1976, p. 172; Herman 2006, p. 157; Thom, Herman & Woods, § C
Untitled: ("The chariots were chanting")	14	The chariots were chanting	Shadows of Dreams	1989	The Last Words He Heard		Letter:^{K} Tevis Clyde Smith, c. December 1928 (Herman 2006, p. 179)	Herman 2006, p. 179
Untitled: ("Chesterton twanged on his lyre")	5	Chesterton twanged on his lyre	A Rhyme of Salem Town and Other Poems	2002	A Song of Bards		Tentative title^{B} (Lord 1976, p. 311)	Lord 1976, p. 311; Herman 2006, p. 208
Untitled: The Chief of the Matabeles	84	The warm veldt spread beneath the tropic sun	A Rhyme of Salem Town and Other Poems	2002	Untitled: ("The warm veldt spread beneath the tropic sun")		Tentative title^{B} (Lord 1976, p. 302); Unfinished (Lord 1976, p. 302)/(Herman 2006, p. 157); An early work^{C} (Lord 1976, p. 302)	Lord 1976, p. 302; Herman 2006, p. 157; Thom, Herman & Woods, § C
Untitled: The Children of the Night	4	Tread not where stony deserts hold	Dark Things	1971	The House in the Oaks; Untitled: ("Tread not where stony deserts hold")		Third of the three verses from "The House In The Oaks" (with "An Open Window" and "Arkham"). Originally from an early draft of "The Children of the Night", attributed to fictitious poet Justin Geoffrey. Replaced in the final version with two lines from "The Gates of Damascus" by James Flecker, this poem was added by Derleth to his version of "The House in the Oaks"; titled with the first line in COLLECTED POETRY. Herman 2006, p. 157	Herman 2006, p. 157; Thom, Herman & Woods, § C
Untitled: ("A Chinese washer, Ching-Ling ...")		A Chinese washer, Ching-Ling ...	The Toreador	5 July 1925				Herman 2006, p. 220
Untitled: ("Cities brooding beneath the seas")	19	Cities brooding beneath the seas	The Howard Collector #6	Spring 1965	Lines To Lovecraft; Who is Grandpa Theobold?		Originally untitled (Lord 1976, p. 191); Letter:^{K} Tevis Clyde Smith, c. November 1931 (Herman 2006, p. 240)	Lord 1976, p. 191; Herman 2006, p. 240
Untitled: ("A clash of steel, a thud of hoofs")	4	A clash of steel, a thud of hoofs	The Last of the Trunk Och Brev I Urval	Mar 2007		Wikisource	Letter:^{K} Tevis Clyde Smith, August 4, 1923 (Herman 2006, p. 220); PD^{L}	Herman 2006, p. 220
Untitled: Code	4	We're a jolly good bunch of bums	A Rhyme of Salem Town and Other Poems	2002	Untitled: ("We're a jolly good bunch of bums")		Tentative title^{B} (Lord 1976, p. 302); An early work^{C} (Lord 1976, p. 302)	Lord 1976, p. 302; Herman 2006, p. 158; Thom, Herman & Woods, § C
Untitled: ("Come with me to the Land of Sunrise")	8	Come with me to the Land of Sunrise	A Rhyme of Salem Town and Other Poems	2002	The Trail of Gold		Tentative title^{B} (Lord 1976, p. 312); An early work^{C} (Lord 1976, p. 312)	Lord 1976, p. 312; Herman 2006, p. 217
Untitled: Cornish Jack	88	Away in the dusty barracoon	A Rhyme of Salem Town and Other Poems	2002	Untitled: ("Away in the dusty barracoon")		Tentative title^{B} (Lord 1976, p. 302)	Lord 1976, p. 302; Herman 2006, p. 159; Thom, Herman & Woods, § C
Untitled: Counterspells	4	The doine sidhe sang to our swords by night	Unaussprechlichen Kulten #1	Oct 1990	Untitled: ("The doine sidhe sang to our swords by night")		Tentative title^{B} (Lord 1976, p. 302)	Lord 1976, p. 302; Herman 2006, p. 159; Thom, Herman & Woods, § C
Untitled: ("A cringing woman's lot is hard")	44	A cringing woman's lot is hard	The Last of the Trunk Och Brev I Urval	Mar 2007		Wikisource	Letter:^{K} Tevis Clyde Smith, c. June 1928 (Herman 2006, p. 220); PD^{L}	Herman 2006, p. 220
Untitled: Dance Macabre	16	I saw the grass on the hillside bend	Weirdbook #12	1977	Untitled: ("I saw the grass on the hillside bend")		Tentative title^{B} (Lord 1976, p. 302)	Lord 1976, p. 302; Herman 2006, p. 160
Untitled: ("Dark are your eyes")	10	Dark are your eyes	The Last of the Trunk Och Brev I Urval	Mar 2007		Wikisource	Letter:^{K} Tevis Clyde Smith, January 30, 1925 (Herman 2006, p. 220); PD^{L}	Herman 2006, p. 220
Untitled: Daughter of Evil	44	They cast her out of the court of the king	Chacal #2	Spring 1977	Untitled ("They cast her out of the court of the king")		Letter:^{K} Tevis Clyde Smith, c. September 1930 (Herman 2006, p. 160); Tentative title^{B} (Lord 1976, p. 302)	Lord 1976, p. 302; Herman 2006, p. 160
Untitled: A Dawn in Flanders	8	I can recall a quiet sky once more	The Howard Collector #5	Summer 1964	Untitled: ("I can recall a quiet sky")			Lord 1976, p. 172; Herman 2006, p. 160
Untitled: ("The day that towers, sapphire kissed")	20	The day that towers, sapphire kissed	Always Comes Evening	1957	Nisapur	"Nisapur"	Originally untitled (Lord 1976, p. 181)	Lord 1976, p. 181; Herman 2006, p. 188
Untitled: Days of Glory	12	Ah, those were glittering, jeweled days	Night Images	1976	Untitled: ("Ah, those were glittering, jeweled days")		Tentative title^{B} (Lord 1976, p. 302)	Lord 1976, p. 302; Herman 2006, p. 161
Untitled: ("Deep in my bosom ...")	8	Deep in my bosom ...	THE COLLECTED LETTERS OF ROBERT E. HOWARD, VOLUME 3: 1933–1936	2008			From a letter to Tevis Clyde Smith, undated ("Salaam: / I have forgotten ..."); did NOT get included in the first edition of COLLECTED POETRY	
Untitled: The Desert	7	Wide and free ranging	A Rhyme of Salem Town and Other Poems	2002	Untitled: ("Wide and free ranging")		Tentative title^{B} (Lord 1976, p. 302); An early work^{C} (Lord 1976, p. 302)	Lord 1976, p. 302; Herman 2006, p. 161
Untitled: Desire	14	"Turn out the light." I raised a willing hand	Desire and Other Erotic Poems	1989	Untitled: ("'Turn out the light.'")		Tentative title^{B} (Lord 1976, p. 303)	Lord 1976, p. 303; Herman 2006, p. 162
Untitled: Devon Oak	20	I am a Devon oak	A Rhyme of Salem Town and Other Poems	2002	Untitled: ("I am a Devon oak")		Tentative title^{B} (Lord 1976, p. 303)	Lord 1976, p. 303; Herman 2006, p. 162
Untitled: ("The doine sidhe sang to our swords by night")	4	The doine sidhe sang to our swords by night	Unaussprechlichen Kulten #1	Oct 1990	Counterspells		Tentative title^{B} (Lord 1976, p. 302)	Lord 1976, p. 302; Herman 2006, p. 159; Thom, Herman & Woods, § C
Untitled: Down the Ages	22	Forever down the ages	A Rhyme of Salem Town and Other Poems	2002	Untitled: ("Forever down the ages")		Tentative title^{B} (Lord 1976, p. 303); Unfinished (Lord 1976, p. 303)	Lord 1976, p. 303; Herman 2006, p. 162
Untitled: ("Drawers that a girl strips down her thighs")	4	Drawers that a girl strips down her thighs	The Last of the Trunk Och Brev I Urval	Mar 2007		Wikisource	Letter:^{K} Tevis Clyde Smith, c. November 1928 (Herman 2006, p. 221); PD^{L}	Herman 2006, p. 221
Untitled: The Drum	14	I heard the drum as I went down the street	A Rhyme of Salem Town and Other Poems	2002	Untitled: ("I heard the drum as I went down the street")		Tentative title^{B} (Lord 1976, p. 303)	Lord 1976, p. 303; Herman 2006, p. 164
Untitled: The Drums of Pictdom	4	How can I wear the harness of toil	Bran Mak Morn	Sep 1969	Untitled: ("How can I wear the harness of toil")		Originally untitled (Lord 1976, p. 173)	Lord 1976, p. 173; Herman 2006, p. 164
Untitled: Dust Dance, The (2)^{N}	72	For I, with the shape of my kin, the ape	The Howard Collector #7	Winter 1965	Untitled: ("For I, with the shape of my kin, the ape")		Incomplete (Lord 1976, p. 173); Shares lines with version (1), The Song of Horsa's Galley and The Road to Hell (Lord 1976, p. 173); Letter:^{K} Tevis Clyde Smith, c. March 1928, partial (Herman 2006, p. 165)	Lord 1976, p. 173; Herman 2006, p. 165
Untitled: ("Early in the morning I gazed at the eastern skies")	4	Early in the morning I gazed at the eastern skies	The Last of the Trunk Och Brev I Urval	Mar 2007		Wikisource	PD^{L}	Herman 2006, p. 221
Untitled: ("Early in the mornin' in the month of May")	16	Early in the mornin' in the month of May					From the story BOOT HILL PAYOFF (embedded within the text); did NOT get included in the first edition of COLLECTED POETRY	
Untitled: ("The east is red and I am dead")	2	The east is red and I am dead	The Collected Letters of Robert E. Howard, Volume 1: 1923-1929	Jun 2007		Wikisource	Letter:^{K} Tevis Clyde Smith, c. January 1928 (Herman 2006, p. 221); PD^{L}	Herman 2006, p. 221
Untitled: Ecstasy	60	There is a strangeness in my soul	Rhymes of Death	1975	Untitled: ("There is a strangeness in my soul")		Tentative title^{B} (Lord 1976, p. 303)	Lord 1976, p. 303; Herman 2006, p. 166
Untitled: The Ecstasy of Desolation	22	Long were the years, lifelong and deathly-bare	Shadows of Dreams	1989	Untitled: ("Long were the years, lifelong and deathly-bare")		Letter:^{K} Tevis Clyde Smith, c. October 1928 (Herman 2006, p. 166)	Herman 2006, p. 166
Untitled: Edgar Guest	5	How long have you written, Eddie Guest? How long have you twirled a pen	A Rhyme of Salem Town and Other Poems	2002	Untitled: ("How long have you written, Eddie Guest?")		Tentative title^{B} (Lord 1976, p. 303); Unfinished (Lord 1976, p. 303)/(Herman 2006, p. 166)	Lord 1976, p. 303; Herman 2006, p. 166
Untitled: ("The elder gods have fled")	4	The elder gods have fled	A Rhyme of Salem Town and Other Poems	2002	Passing of the Elder Gods		Tentative title^{B} (Lord 1976, p. 308)	Lord 1976, p. 308; Herman 2006, p. 192
Untitled: ("Eons before Atlantean days")	24	Eons before Atlantean days in the time of the world's black dawn	Ariel^{[Horror]}	Autumn 1976^{[Horror]}	The Symbol		Tentative title^{B} (Lord 1976, p. 311)	Lord 1976, p. 311; Herman 2006, p. 212; Howard 2008, p. x
Untitled: "Exhortation"	4	Oh, ye who tread the narrow way	A Rhyme of Salem Town and Other Poems	2002	Untitled: ("Oh, ye who tread the narrow way")		Tentative title^{B} (Lord 1976, p. 304); An early work^{C} (Lord 1976, p. 304)	Lord 1976, p. 304; Herman 2006, p. 167
Untitled: "A Fable for Critics"	98	Now come the days of high endeavor and / The blare of brazen trumpets through the land.	Shadows of Dreams	1989	Untitled: ("Now come the days of high endeavor")		Letter:^{K} Tevis Clyde Smith, ca. November–December 1928	
Untitled: ("Far in the gloomy Northland")	24	Far in the gloomy Northland	A Rhyme of Salem Town and Other Poems	2002	Far in the Gloomy Northland		Tentative title^{B} (Lord 1976, p. 304); An early work^{C} (Lord 1976, p. 304)	Lord 1976, p. 304; Herman 2006, p. 168
Untitled: "Farewell, Proud Munster"	28	Night in the county of Donegal	A Rhyme of Salem Town and Other Poems	2002	Untitled: ("Night in the county of Donegal")		Tentative title^{B} (Lord 1976, p. 304); An early work^{C} (Lord 1976, p. 304)	Lord 1976, p. 304; Herman 2006, p. 168
Untitled: "The Feud"	12	He did not glance above the trail to the laurel where I lay	Fantasy Crossroads #13	Jun 1978	Untitled: ("He did not glance above the trail")		Tentative title^{B} (Lord 1976, p. 304)	Lord 1976, p. 304; Herman 2006, p. 168
Untitled: ("Fill up my goblet")	15	Fill up my goblet	The Robert E. Howard Foundation Newsletter, vol. 1, #2	Nov 2007	Last 8 lines used as verse heading in the short story "The Sowers of the Thunder" as "The Ballad of Baibars"			Herman 2006, p. 221
Untitled: ("The first came up / Was a little cabin boy ...")	5 7-line verses and a 6-line chorus repeated after each one	The first came up / Was a little cabin boy	The Collected Letters of Robert E. Howard, Volume 1: 1923-1929	Jun 2007	The Mermaid; Oh, The Stormy Winds;	https://www.youtube.com/watch?v=BcAPJ77WfCs	Mnemonic reconstruction^{V} of an old folk song Letter:^{K} Robert W. Gordon, February 4, 1925; NOT INCLUDED IN COLLECTED POETRY	
Untitled: ("The first great man that ever I robbed ...")	16	The first great man that ever I robbed	The Collected Letters of Robert E. Howard, Volume 1: 1923-1929	Jun 2007	The Highwaymen	http://mudcat.org/thread.cfm?threadid=29243); https://www.youtube.com/watch?v=MD4Nd_rzNWg	Mnemonic reconstruction^{V} of "Allan Tyne of Harrow" a.k.a. "Valentine of Harrow" Letter:^{K} Robert W. Gordon, misdated January 2, 1926—actually 1927; NOT INCLUDED IN COLLECTED POETRY	
Untitled: "Flaming Marble"	14	I carved a woman out of marble when	Poet's Scroll	Jan 1929	Untitled: ("I carved a woman out of marble")	Wikisource	PD^{L}; Pen name: Patrick Howard^{O} (Herman 2006, p. 168)	Herman 2006, p. 168
Untitled: ("Flappers flicker and flap and flirt")	12	Flappers flicker and flap and flirt	The Last of the Trunk Och Brev I Urval	Mar 2007		Wikisource	Letter:^{K} Tevis Clyde Smith, c. December 1928 (Herman 2006, p. 221); PD^{L}	Herman 2006, p. 221
Untitled: "Flight"	24	A jackal laughed from a thicket still, the stars were haggard pale	Witchcraft & Sorcery	May 1971	Untitled: ("A jackal laughed from a thicket still")		Letter:^{K} Tevis Clyde Smith, c. September 1927, earlier, shorter version (Herman 2006, p. 168)	Lord 1976, p. 175; Herman 2006, p. 168
Untitled: ("For I have seen the lizards crawl")	16	For I have seen the lizards crawl	Always Comes Evening	1957	Babylon	"Babylon"	Originally untitled (Lord 1976, p. 171)	Lord 1976, p. 171; Herman 2006, p. 152; Thom, Herman & Woods, § B
Untitled: ("For I, with the shape of my kin, the ape")	72	For I, with the shape of my kin, the ape	The Howard Collector #7	Winter 1965	Dust Dance, The (2)^{N}		Incomplete (Lord 1976, p. 173); Shares lines with version (1), The Song of Horsa's Galley and The Road to Hell (Lord 1976, p. 173); Letter:^{K} Tevis Clyde Smith, c. March 1928, partial (Herman 2006, p. 165)	Lord 1976, p. 173; Herman 2006, p. 165
Untitled: ("For what is a maid to the shout of kings")	14	For what is a maid to the shout of kings	A Rhyme of Salem Town and Other Poems	2002			Incomplete, only the final fourteen lines survive (Lord 1976, p. 312)	Lord 1976, p. 312; Herman 2006, p. 221
Untitled: ("Forever down the ages")	22	Forever down the ages	A Rhyme of Salem Town and Other Poems	2002	Down the Ages		Tentative title^{B} (Lord 1976, p. 303); Unfinished (Lord 1976, p. 303)	Lord 1976, p. 303; Herman 2006, p. 162
Untitled: ("Forth from the purple")	12	Forth from the purple and feats of the palace	The Grim Land and Others	1976	The Outcast		Tentative title^{B} (Lord 1976, p. 308)	Lord 1976, p. 308; Herman 2006, p. 191
Untitled: "Freedom"	8	The world is rife, say I	A Rhyme of Salem Town and Other Poems	2002	Untitled: ("The world is rife, say I")		Tentative title^{B} (Lord 1976, p. 304)	Lord 1976, p. 304; Herman 2006, p. 169
Untitled: ("From the dim red dawn of Creation")	34	From the dim red dawn of Creation	Always Comes Evening^{A}	1957^{A}	Men of the Shadows (verse heading)	"Men of the Shadows"	From:^{T} Men of the Shadows (Lord 1976, p. 180); Originally untitled (Lord 1976, p. 180)	Lord 1976, p. 180; Herman 2006, p. 184
Untitled: "The Ghost Ocean"	16	There is a sea and a silent moon	The Ghost Ocean and Other Poems of the Supernatural	1982	Untitled: ("There is a sea and a silent moon")		Tentative title^{B} (Lord 1976, p. 304)	Lord 1976, p. 304; Herman 2006, p. 171
Untitled: ("Give ye of my best though the dole be meager")	8	Give ye of my best though the dole be meager	The Last of the Trunk Och Brev I Urval	Mar 2007		Wikisource	Letter:^{K} Tevis Clyde Smith, June 23, 1926 (Herman 2006, p. 222); PD^{L}	Herman 2006, p. 222
Untitled: "The Gods of Easter Island"	14	Long ere Priapus pranced through groves Arcadian sunlight kissed	Always Comes Evening	1957	Untitled: ("Long ere Priapus pranced through groves")	"The Gods of Easter Island"	Originally untitled (Lord 1976, p. 176)	Lord 1976, p. 176; Herman 2006, p. 171
Untitled: ("Gods of heather, gods of lake")	34	Gods of heather, gods of lake	Always Comes Evening	1957	Rune; Rune of the Ancient One	"Rune"	From:^{T} Men of the Shadows (Lord 1976, p. 185); Originally untitled (Lord 1976, p. 185); Separate version called Rune of the Ancient One (Herman 2006, p. 200)	Lord 1976, p. 185; Herman 2006, p. 200
Untitled: ("The great grey oaks by the banks of the river")	5	The great grey oaks by the banks of the river	A Rhyme of Salem Town and Other Poems	2002	The Oaks		Tentative title^{B} (Lord 1976, p. 308)	Lord 1976, p. 308; Herman 2006, p. 189
Untitled: "The Guise of Youth"	20	Men say my years are few; yet I am old	Science-Fantasy Correspondent #1	Dec 1975	Untitled: ("Men say my years are few; yet I am old")		Tentative title^{B} (Lord 1976, p. 307)	Lord 1976, p. 307; Herman 2006, p. 172
Untitled: ("Hark, hark, the jackals bark")	41	Hark, hark, the jackals bark	Fantasy Crossroads #7	Feb 1976	Madame Goose's Rhymes		Tentative title^{B} (Lord 1976, p. 306)	Lord 1976, p. 306; Herman 2006, p. 183
Untitled: "Harvest"	4	We reap and bind the bitter yield	The Howard Collector	Autumn 1972	Untitled: ("We reap and bind the bitter yield")		Originally untitled (Lord 1976, p. 176)	Lord 1976, p. 176; Herman 2006, p. 173
Untitled: ("A haunting cadence fills the night")	58	A haunting cadence fills the night with fierce longing ...	Yesteryear #4	Oct 1989				Herman 2006, p. 222
Untitled: ("He clutched his penis tight")	4	He clutched his penis tight	The Collected Letters of Robert E. Howard, Volume 1: 1923-1929	Jun 2007		Wikisource	Letter:^{K} Tevis Clyde Smith, c. November 1928 (Herman 2006, p. 222); PD^{L}	Herman 2006, p. 222
Untitled: ("He did not glance above the trail")	12	He did not glance above the trail to the laurel where I lay	Fantasy Crossroads #13	Jun 1978	The Feud		Tentative title^{B} (Lord 1976, p. 304)	Lord 1976, p. 304; Herman 2006, p. 168
Untitled: ("He has rigged her and tricked her")	5	He has rigged her and tricked her	A Rhyme of Salem Town and Other Poems	2002	The Stralsund		Tentative title^{B} (Lord 1976, p. 311)	Lord 1976, p. 311; Herman 2006, p. 211
Untitled: ("The helmsman gaily, rode down the rickerboo")	7	The helmsman gaily, rode down the rickerboo	The Last of the Trunk Och Brev I Urval	Mar 2007		Wikisource	Letter:^{K} Tevis Clyde Smith, June 22, 1923 (Herman 2006, p. 222); PD^{L}	Herman 2006, p. 222
Untitled: ("Here where the post oaks crown the ridge")	39	Here where the post oaks crown the ridge, and the dreary sand-drifts lie	A Robert E. Howard Memorial: June 13–15, 1986	1986	The Sand-Hills' Crest		Tentative title^{B} (Lord 1976, p. 310)	Lord 1976, p. 310; Herman 2006, p. 201
Untitled: ("H'Id like to see Cheapside go up in flames")	4	H'Id like to see Cheapside go up in flames	The Collected Letters of Robert E. Howard, Volume 1: 1923-1929	Jun 2007	Untitled: ("H'Id like to see Cheapside go up in flames")		Letter:^{K} Tevis Clyde Smith, contained in the untitled story "Hatrack!"; NOT INCLUDED IN COLLECTED POETRY	
Untitled: ("A high land and a hill land!")		A high land and a hill land!	Unpublished	n/a	Untitled: ("A high land and a hill land!")		handwritten, discovered among the Tevis Clyde Smith papers at Texas A & M University	Thom, Herman & Woods
Untitled: ("High on his throne Baal-pteor sat")	6	High on his throne Baal-pteor sat	A Rhyme of Salem Town and Other Poems	2002	Baal-pteor		Tentative title^{B} (Lord 1976, p. 301)	Lord 1976, p. 301; Herman 2006, p. 151; Thom, Herman & Woods, § B
Untitled: ("High on this throne sat Bran Mak Morn")	72	High on this throne sat Bran Mak Morn	Bran Mak Morn	Sep 1969	A Song of the Race		Originally untitled (Lord 1976, p. 188); A Bran Mak Morn poem	Lord 1976, p. 188; Herman 2006, p. 210
Untitled: ("High the towers and mighty the walls")	43	High the towers and mighty the walls, oh, proud-crested sons of Babylon	A Rhyme of Salem Town and Other Poems	2002	Who Shall Sing of Babylon?		Tentative title^{B} (Lord 1976, p. 314)	Lord 1976, p. 314; Herman 2006, p. 240
Untitled: ("Hills of the North! Lavender hills")	7	Hills of the North! Lavender hills	The Last of the Trunk Och Brev I Urval	Mar 2007		Wikisource	Letter:^{K} Tevis Clyde Smith, January 30, 1925 (Herman 2006, p. 222); PD^{L}	Herman 2006, p. 222
Untitled: ("Ho, for a trail that is bloody and long!")	4	Ho, for a trail that is bloody and long	A Rhyme of Salem Town and Other Poems	2002	Trail's End		Tentative title^{B} (Lord 1976, p. 312); Possibly incomplete (Lord 1976, p. 312); From:^{T} Untitled, begins "As he approached..." (Lord 1976, p. 312)	Lord 1976, p. 312; Herman 2006, p. 217
Untitled: ("Ho, ho, the long lights lift amain")	Putatively, 16 lines-—In the original letter, the entire poem is written out like a paragraph of prose	Ho, ho, the long lights lift amain	The Last of the Trunk Och Brev I Urval	Mar 2007			Letter:^{K} Tevis Clyde Smith, c. June 1928 (Herman 2006, p. 223)	Herman 2006, p. 223
Untitled: ("Ho merry bark ...")		Ho merry bark ...	The Right Hook^{I} vol. 1, #2	1925				Herman 2006, p. 223
Untitled: The House in the Oaks	4	Tread not where stony deserts hold	Dark Things	1971	The Children of the Night; Untitled: ("Tread not where stony deserts hold")		Third of the three verses from "The House In The Oaks" (with "An Open Window" and "Arkham"). Originally from an early draft of "The Children of the Night", attributed to fictitious poet Justin Geoffrey. Replaced in the final version with two lines from "The Gates of Damascus" by James Flecker, this poem was added by Derleth to his version of "The House in the Oaks"; titled with the first line in COLLECTED POETRY. Herman 2006, p. 157	Herman 2006, p. 157; Thom, Herman & Woods, § C
Untitled: ("The House of Asgard passes with the night")	8	The House of Asgard passes with the night	The Howard Collector #14	Spring 1971	No More the Serpent Prow		Originally untitled (Lord 1976, p. 181)	Lord 1976, p. 181; Herman 2006, p. 188
Untitled: The House of Gael	12	The ancient boast, the ancient song	A Rhyme of Salem Town and Other Poems	2002	Untitled: ("The ancient boast, the ancient song")		Tentative title^{B} (Lord 1976, p. 307)	Lord 1976, p. 307; Herman 2006, p. 174
Untitled: ("How can I wear the harness of toil")	4	How can I wear the harness of toil	Bran Mak Morn	Sep 1969	The Drums of Pictdom		Originally untitled (Lord 1976, p. 173)	Lord 1976, p. 173; Herman 2006, p. 164
Untitled: ("How long have you written, Eddie Guest?")	5	How long have you written, Eddie Guest? How long have you twirled a pen	A Rhyme of Salem Town and Other Poems	2002	Edgar Guest		Tentative title^{B} (Lord 1976, p. 303); Unfinished (Lord 1976, p. 303)/(Herman 2006, p. 166)	Lord 1976, p. 303; Herman 2006, p. 166
Untitled: ("A hundred years the great war raged")	4	A hundred years the great war raged	The Last of the Trunk Och Brev I Urval	Mar 2007		Wikisource	Letter:^{K} Tevis Clyde Smith, August 4, 1923 (Herman 2006, p. 223); PD^{L}	Herman 2006, p. 223
Untitled: ("I am a Devon oak")	20	I am a Devon oak	A Rhyme of Salem Town and Other Poems	2002	Devon Oak		Tentative title^{B} (Lord 1976, p. 303)	Lord 1976, p. 303; Herman 2006, p. 162
Untitled: ("I am an actor and have been an actor from birth")	12	I am an actor and have been an actor from birth	A Rhyme of Salem Town and Other Poems	2002	The Actor		Tentative title^{B} (Lord 1976, p. 300)	Lord 1976, p. 300; Herman 2006, p. 147; Thom, Herman & Woods, § A
Untitled: ("I am MAN from the primal, I")	7	I am MAN from the primal, I	The Last of the Trunk Och Brev I Urval	Mar 2007		Wikisource	Letter:^{K} Tevis Clyde Smith, c. March 1928 (Herman 2006, p. 223); PD^{L}	Herman 2006, p. 223
Untitled: ("I am the Spirit of War!")	9	I am the Spirit of War!	The Last of the Trunk Och Brev I Urval	Mar 2007		Wikisource	Letter:^{K} Tevis Clyde Smith, January 30, 1925 (Herman 2006, p. 223); PD^{L}	Herman 2006, p. 223
Untitled: ("I Call the Muster of Iron Men")		I call the muster of iron men	Argosy All-Story Weekly	July 20, 1929	Untitled: ("I call the muster of iron men")		From an early draft of the short story "Crowd-Horror"; titled with the first line in COLLECTED POETRY	
Untitled: ("I can recall a quiet sky")	8	I can recall a quiet sky once more	The Howard Collector #5	Summer 1964	A Dawn in Flanders			Lord 1976, p. 172; Herman 2006, p. 160
Untitled: ("I carved a woman out of marble")	14	I carved a woman out of marble when	Poet's Scroll	Jan 1929	Flaming Marble	Wikisource	PD^{L}; Pen name: Patrick Howard^{O} (Herman 2006, p. 168)	Herman 2006, p. 168
Untitled: ("I caught Joan alone upon her bed")	4	I caught Joan alone upon her bed	A Rhyme of Salem Town and Other Poems	2002	Prelude		Tentative title^{B} (Lord 1976, p. 309)	Lord 1976, p. 309; Herman 2006, p. 193
Untitled: ("I cut my teeth on toil and pain")	12	I cut my teeth on toil and pain	The Ghost Ocean and Other Poems of the Supernatural	1982	When the Glaciers Rumbled South		Tentative title^{B} (Lord 1976, p. 313)	Lord 1976, p. 313; Herman 2006, p. 238
Untitled: ("I do not sing of a paradise")	4	I do not sing of a paradise	The Collected Letters of Robert E. Howard, Volume 1: 1923-1929	Jun 2007		Wikisource	Letter:^{K} Tevis Clyde Smith, c. January 1928 (Herman 2006, p. 224); PD^{L}	Herman 2006, p. 224
Untitled: ("I hate the man who tells me that I lied")	24	I hate the man who tells me that I lied	The Collected Letters of Robert E. Howard, Volume 1: 1923-1929	Jun 2007		Wikisource	Letter:^{K} Tevis Clyde Smith, c. November 1928 (Herman 2006, p. 224); PD^{L}	Herman 2006, p. 224
Untitled: ("I heard the drum as I went down the street")	14	I heard the drum as I went down the street	A Rhyme of Salem Town and Other Poems	2002	The Drum		Tentative title^{B} (Lord 1976, p. 303)	Lord 1976, p. 303; Herman 2006, p. 164
Untitled: ("I hold all women are a gang of tramps")	10	I hold all women are a gang of tramps	The Last of the Trunk Och Brev I Urval	Mar 2007		Wikisource	PD^{L}	Herman 2006, p. 224
Untitled: ("I knocked upon her lattice — soft!")	8	I knocked upon her lattice — soft!	Lewd Tales	1987			Letter:^{K} Tevis Clyde Smith, c. March 1929 (Herman 2006, p. 224); From:^{T} Songs of Bastards, Act 1, Scene 1	Herman 2006, p. 224
Untitled: ("I lay in Yen's opium joint")	7	I lay in Yen's opium joint	The Last of the Trunk Och Brev I Urval	Mar 2007		Wikisource	Letter:^{K} Tevis Clyde Smith, January 30, 1925 (Herman 2006, p. 224); PD^{L}	Herman 2006, p. 224
Untitled: ("I'm more than a man ...")		I'm more than a man ...	n/a	n/a			From the draft of the story Yellow Laughter (Herman 2006, p. 225); Never published (Herman 2006, p. 225)	Herman 2006, p. 225
Untitled: ("I saw the grass on the hillside bend")	16	I saw the grass on the hillside bend	Weirdbook #12	1977	Dance Macabre		Tentative title^{B} (Lord 1976, p. 302)	Lord 1976, p. 302; Herman 2006, p. 160
Untitled: ("I stand in the streets of the city")	8	I stand in the streets of the city	Night Images	1976	The King of the Ages Comes		Tentative title^{B} (Lord 1976, p. 307)	Lord 1976, p. 307; Herman 2006, p. 178
Untitled: ("I tell you this my friend ...")	9	I tell you this my friend ...	The Last of the Trunk Och Brev I Urval	Mar 2007	Wikisource		Letter:^{K} Tevis Clyde Smith, August 6, 1925 (Herman 2006, p. 224); PD^{L}	Herman 2006, p. 224
Untitled: ("I too have strode those white-paved roads")	4	I too have strode those white-paved roads that run	The Howard Collector #17	Autumn 1972	Roads		Originally untitled (Lord 1976, p. 184)	Lord 1976, p. 184; Herman 2006, p. 199
Untitled: ("I was a chief of the Chatagai")	21	I was a chief of the Chatagai	Night Images	1976	A Thousand Years Ago		Tentative title^{B} (Lord 1976, p. 311)	Lord 1976, p. 311; Herman 2006, p. 214
Untitled: ("I was a prince of China")	18	I was a prince of China, lord of a million spears	Always Comes Evening	1957	Prince and Beggar		Originally untitled (Lord 1976, p. 182)	Lord 1976, p. 182; Herman 2006, p. 194
Untitled: ("I, was I there")	10	I, was I there	A Rhyme of Salem Town and Other Poems	2002	Was I There?		Tentative title^{B} (Lord 1976, p. 313)	Lord 1976, p. 313; Herman 2006, p. 237
Untitled: ("I was once, I declare, a grog-shop man")	28	I was once, I declare, a grog-shop man	Shadows of Dreams	1989	A Ballad of Beer		Letter:^{K} Tevis Clyde Smith, c. July 1930 (Herman 2006, p. 152); Originally untitled (Herman 2006, p. 152)	Herman 2006, p. 152; Thom, Herman & Woods, § B
Untitled: ("If life was a thing that money could buy")	2	If life was a thing that money could buy	The Collected Letters of Robert E. Howard, Volume 1: 1923-1929	Jun 2007			Letter:^{K} Tevis Clyde Smith, ca. October 1927; contained in the story "The Fastidious Fooey Mancucu"; parody of an old saying whose second line is usually some variant of "The rich would live and the poor would die"	
Untitled: ("I'm more than a man ...")		I'm more than a man ...	n/a	n/a			From the draft of the story Yellow Laughter (Herman 2006, p. 225); Never published (Herman 2006, p. 225)	Herman 2006, p. 225
Untitled: "In the Ring"	47	Over the place the lights go out	Robert E. Howard's Fight Magazine #4	Oct 1996	Untitled: ("Over the place the lights go out")		Tentative title^{B} (Lord 1976, p. 307)	Lord 1976, p. 307; Herman 2006, p. 175
Untitled: "Invective"	4	There burns in me no honeyed drop of love	Always Comes Evening	1957	Untitled: ("There burns in me no honeyed drop of love")	"Invective"		Lord 1976, p. 177; Herman 2006, p. 175
Untitled: ("The iron harp that Adam christened Life")	18	The iron harp that Adam christened Life	The Collected Letters of Robert E. Howard, Volume 1: 1923-1929	Jun 2007		Wikisource	Letter:^{K} Tevis Clyde Smith, c. April 1929 (Herman 2006, p. 225); PD^{L}	Herman 2006, p. 225
Untitled: ("It wuz on a starry night, in the month of July")	4	It wuz on a starry night, in the month of July ...)	The Howard Collector #6	1965	LAMENT FOR JESSE JAMES; Title is Howard's only to the extent that it is referred to thus in the text.		A barroom song taken from the Sonora Kid story "Knife, Bullet and Noose"(a.k.a. "Knife, Gun and Noose"); variation on a very common theme, probably with adjustments by Howard. Probably never published separately.]	
Untitled: ("A jackal laughed from a thicket still")	24	A jackal laughed from a thicket still, the stars were haggard pale	Witchcraft & Sorcery	May 1971	Flight		Letter:^{K} Tevis Clyde Smith, c. September 1927, earlier, shorter version (Herman 2006, p. 168)	Lord 1976, p. 175; Herman 2006, p. 168
Untitled: Ju-ju Doom	14	As a great spider grows to monstrous girth	A Rhyme of Salem Town and Other Poems	2002	Untitled: ("As a great spider grows to monstrous girth")		Tentative title^{B} (Lord 1976, p. 307)	Lord 1976, p. 307; Herman 2006, p. 176
Untitled: ("Keep women, thrones and kingly lands")	4	Keep women, thrones and kingly lands	The Collected Letters of Robert E. Howard, Volume 1: 1923-1929	Jun 2007		Wikisource	Letter:^{K} Tevis Clyde Smith, c. January 1928 (Herman 2006, p. 225); PD^{L}	Herman 2006, p. 225
Untitled: ("Keresa, Keresita")	24	Keresa, Keresita	Shadows of Dreams	1989	Keresa, Keresita		Letter:^{K} Tevis Clyde Smith, c. March 1928 (Herman 2006, p. 177)	Herman 2006, p. 177
Untitled: "The King of the Ages Comes"	8	I stand in the streets of the city	Night Images	1976	Untitled: ("I stand in the streets of the city")		Tentative title^{B} (Lord 1976, p. 307)	Lord 1976, p. 307; Herman 2006, p. 178
Untitled: "Krakorum"	4	A thousand years ago great Genghis reigned	A Rhyme of Salem Town and Other Poems	2002	Untitled: ("A thousand years ago great Genghis reigned")		Tentative title^{B} (Lord 1976, p. 305); An early work^{C} (Lord 1976, p. 305); An introduction by Howard states that he was 17 when he wrote this poem (Herman 2006, p. 178)	Lord 1976, p. 305; Herman 2006, p. 178
Untitled: "The Ladder of Life"	4	Life is a ladder of cynical years	A Rhyme of Salem Town and Other Poems	2002	Untitled: ("Life is a ladder of cynical years")		Tentative title^{B} (Lord 1976, p. 305)	Lord 1976, p. 305; Herman 2006, p. 178
Untitled: "Land of the Pioneer"	8	The wild bees hum in the tangled vines	A Rhyme of Salem Town and Other Poems	2002	Untitled: ("The wild bees hum")		Tentative title^{B} (Lord 1976, p. 305); An early work^{C} (Lord 1976, p. 305)	Lord 1976, p. 305; Herman 2006, p. 179
Untitled: "The Last Words He Heard"	14	The chariots were chanting	Shadows of Dreams	1989	Untitled: ("The chariots were chanting")		Letter:^{K} Tevis Clyde Smith, c. December 1928 (Herman 2006, p. 179)	Herman 2006, p. 179
Untitled: "Legacy of Tubal-Cain, The"	10	"No more!" they swear; I laugh to hear them speak	The Howard Collector #18	Autumn 1973	Untitled ("'No more!' they swear ...")		Originally untitled (Lord 1976, p. 179)	Lord 1976, p. 179; Herman 2006, p. 180
Untitled: ("Let it rest with the ages mysteries")	4	Let it rest with the ages mysteries	The Collected Letters of Robert E. Howard, Volume 2: 1930-1932	Oct 2007	Lines To Lovecraft; Who Is Grandpa Theobald? (verse heading)		Letter:^{K} Tevis Clyde Smith, c. November 1931 (Herman 2006, p. 225);Not actually written by Howard, but a quote from WHERE CANNIKANS CLINKED by Charles Nichols Webb, which, to confuse matters, Robert Louis Stevenson also cited in a poem	Herman 2006, p. 225
Untitled: ("Let me dream by a silver stream")	4	Let me dream by a silver stream	The Collected Letters of Robert E. Howard, Volume 3: 1933-1936	2008	Untitled: ("Let me dream by a silver stream")		Letter:^{K} Tevis Clyde Smith, undated; did NOT get included in the first edition of COLLECTED POETRY	
Untitled: ("Let me live as I was born to live")	4	Let me live as I was born to live	The Collected Letters of Robert E. Howard, Volume 1: 1923-1929	Jun 2007		Wikisource	Letter:^{K} Tevis Clyde Smith, c. November 1928 (Herman 2006, p. 225); PD^{L}	Herman 2006, p. 225
Untitled: ("Let us up in the hills ...")		Let us up in the hills ...	Lewd Tales	1987			Letter:^{K} Tevis Clyde Smith, c. March 1929 (Herman 2006, p. 225); From:^{T} Songs of Bastards, Act 1, Scene 2	Herman 2006, p. 225
Untitled: ("Life is a cynical, romantic pig")	5	Life is a cynical, romantic pig	The Collected Letters of Robert E. Howard, Volume 2: 1930-1932	Oct 2007		Wikisource	Letter:^{K} Tevis Clyde Smith, c. February 1930 (Herman 2006, p. 225); PD^{L}	Herman 2006, p. 225
Untitled: ("Life is a ladder of cynical years")	4	Life is a ladder of cynical years	A Rhyme of Salem Town and Other Poems	2002	The Ladder of Life		Tentative title^{B} (Lord 1976, p. 305)	Lord 1976, p. 305; Herman 2006, p. 178
Untitled: ("Life is a lot of hooey")	4	Life is a lot of hooey	Lewd Tales	1987			Letter:^{K} Tevis Clyde Smith, c. March 1929 (Herman 2006, p. 225); From:^{T} Songs of Bastards, Act 2, Scene 1	Herman 2006, p. 225
Untitled: ("Life is the same, yet of many phases")	5	Life is the same, yet of many phases	Unaussprechlichen Kulten #2	Jul 1992	The Phases of Life		Tentative title^{B} (Lord 1976, p. 308); French^{P} (Herman 2006, p. 192)	Lord 1976, p. 308; Herman 2006, p. 192
Untitled "Limericks to Spank By"	15	There was a young girl from Siberia	Desire and Other Erotic Poems	1989	Untitled ("There was a young girl from Siberia")		Tentative title^{B} (Lord 1976, p. 305); Three 5-line limericks (Herman 2006, p. 181)	Lord 1976, p. 305; Herman 2006, p. 181
Untitled: "Lines to Lovecraft"	19	Cities brooding beneath the seas	The Howard Collector #6	Spring 1965	Untitled: ("Cities brooding beneath the seas"); Who is Grandpa Theobold?		Originally untitled (Lord 1976, p. 191); Letter:^{K} Tevis Clyde Smith, c. November 1931 (Herman 2006, p. 240)	Lord 1976, p. 191; Herman 2006, p. 240
Untitled: "Little Bell of Brass"	23	Tingle, jingle, dingle, tingle, hear my brazen tones	A Rhyme of Salem Town and Other Poems	2002	Untitled: ("Tingle, jingle, dingle, tingle")		Tentative title^{B} (Lord 1976, p. 305)	Lord 1976, p. 305; Herman 2006, p. 182
Untitled: ("Little brown man of Nippon who apes the ways of the West")	36	Little brown man of Nippon who apes the ways of the West	A Rhyme of Salem Town and Other Poems	2002	Little Brown Man of Nippon		Tentative title^{B} (Lord 1976, p. 305); Letter:^{K} Tevis Clyde Smith, c. April 1932 (Herman 2006, p. 182)	Lord 1976, p. 305; Herman 2006, p. 182
Untitled: ("Lizzen my children and you shall be told")	6	Lizzen my children and you shall be told	Robert E. Howard: Selected Letters: 1923-1930	Oct 1989			Letter:^{K} Tevis Clyde Smith, c. September 1931 (Herman 2006, p. 226)	Herman 2006, p. 226
Untitled: ("Long ere Priapus pranced through groves")	14	Long ere Priapus pranced through groves Arcadian sunlight kissed	Always Comes Evening	1957	The Gods of Easter Island	"The Gods of Easter Island"	Originally untitled (Lord 1976, p. 176)	Lord 1976, p. 176; Herman 2006, p. 171
Untitled: ("Long were the years, lifelong and deathly-bare")	22	Long were the years, lifelong and deathly-bare	Shadows of Dreams	1989	The Ecstasy of Desolation		Letter:^{K} Tevis Clyde Smith, c. October 1928 (Herman 2006, p. 166)	Herman 2006, p. 166
Untitled: "The Lost Mine"	60	Under the grim San Saba hills	A Rhyme of Salem Town and Other Poems	2002	The Lost San Saba Mine; Untitled: ("Under the grim San Saba hills")		Letter:^{K} H. P. Lovecraft, April 23, 1933 (Herman 2006, p. 182)	Lord 1976, p. 305; Herman 2006, p. 182
Untitled: "The Lost San Saba Mine"	60	Under the grim San Saba hills	A Rhyme of Salem Town and Other Poems	2002	The Lost Mine; Untitled: ("Under the grim San Saba hills")		Letter:^{K} H. P. Lovecraft, April 23, 1933 (Herman 2006, p. 182)	Lord 1976, p. 305; Herman 2006, p. 182
Untitled: ("Love is singing soft and low")	4	Love is singing soft and low	The Last of the Trunk Och Brev I Urval	Mar 2007		Wikisource	Letter:^{K} Tevis Clyde Smith, c. December 1928 (Herman 2006, p. 226); PD^{L}	Herman 2006, p. 226
Untitled: "Madame Goose's Rhymes"	41	Hark, hark, the jackals bark	Fantasy Crossroads #7	Feb 1976	Untitled: ("Hark, hark, the jackals bark")		Tentative title^{B} (Lord 1976, p. 306)	Lord 1976, p. 306; Herman 2006, p. 183
Untitled: ("Mahomet! Man of Mecca!")		Mahomet! Man of Mecca!	A Rhyme of Salem Town and Other Poems	2002	Mahomet			Herman 2006, p. 183
Untitled: "Mankind"	72	The world has changed	A Rhyme of Salem Town and Other Poems	2002	Untitled: ("The world has changed")		Tentative title^{B} (Lord 1976, p. 306); An early work^{C} (Lord 1976, p. 306)	Lord 1976, p. 306; Herman 2006, p. 183
Untitled: ("Many fell at the grog-shop wall")	2	Many fell at the grog-shop wall	Robert E. Howard: Selected Letters: 1923-1930	Oct 1989			Letter:^{K} Tevis Clyde Smith, c. November 1931 (Herman 2006, p. 226)	Herman 2006, p. 226
Untitled: ("The Master beat on his master-drum")	27	The Master beat on his master-drum	Night Images	1976	The Master-Drum		Tentative title^{B} (Lord 1976, p. 306)	Lord 1976, p. 306; Herman 2006, p. 184
Untitled: ("Match a toad with a far-winged hawk")	58	Match a toad with a far-winged hawk	The Last of the Trunk Och Brev I Urval	Mar 2007		Wikisource	Letter:^{K} Tevis Clyde Smith, c. undated (Herman 2006, p. 226); PD^{L}	Herman 2006, p. 226
Untitled: ("Men are toys ...")	4	Men are toys ...	Lewd Tales	1987			Letter:^{K} Tevis Clyde Smith, c. March 1929 (Herman 2006, p. 226); From:^{T} Songs of Bastards	Herman 2006, p. 226
Untitled: ("Men I have slain with naked steel")	24	Men I have slain with naked steel	A Rhyme of Salem Town and Other Poems	2002	The Sword of Lal Singh		Tentative title^{B} (Lord 1976, p. 311); An early work^{C} (Lord 1976, p. 311)	Lord 1976, p. 311; Herman 2006, p. 212
Untitled: "Men of the Shadows" (verse heading)	34	From the dim red dawn of Creation	Always Comes Evening^{A}	1957^{A}	Untitled: ("From the dim red dawn of Creation")	"Men of the Shadows"	From:^{T} Men of the Shadows (Lord 1976, p. 180); Originally untitled (Lord 1976, p. 180)	Lord 1976, p. 180; Herman 2006, p. 184
Untitled: ("Men say my years are few; yet I am old")	20	Men say my years are few; yet I am old	Science-Fantasy Correspondent #1	Dec 1975	The Guise of Youth		Tentative title^{B} (Lord 1976, p. 307)	Lord 1976, p. 307; Herman 2006, p. 172
Untitled: "Mine But to Serve"	91	The moonlight glimmered white across the sands	A Rhyme of Salem Town and Other Poems	2002	Untitled: ("The moonlight glimmered white")		Tentative title^{B} (Lord 1976, p. 306)	Lord 1976, p. 306; Herman 2006, p. 185
Untitled: ("Mingle my dust with the burning brand")	12	Mingle my dust with the burning brand	The Collected Letters of Robert E. Howard, Volume 1: 1923-1929	Jun 2007		Wikisource	Letter:^{K} Tevis Clyde Smith, c. August 28, 1925 (Herman 2006, p. 226); PD^{L}	Herman 2006, p. 226
Untitled: ("Mist and madness and mockery rule")	4	Mist and madness and mockery rule	THE COLLECTED LETTERS OF ROBERT E. HOWARD, VOLUME 2: 1930–1932	2007	Untitled MIST AND MADNESS AND MOCKERY RULE		Letter:^{K} From a letter to Tevis Clyde Smith, ca. May 1930	
Untitled: "A Misty Sea"	6	There is a misty sea beneath the earth	A Rhyme of Salem Town and Other Poems	2002	Untitled: ("There is a misty sea beneath the earth")		Tentative title^{B} (Lord 1976, p. 306)	Lord 1976, p. 306; Herman 2006, p. 185
Untitled: ("The moon above the Kerry hills")	22	The moon above the Kerry hills			Retribution; The Song of Murtagh O'Brien; Black Michael's Story			Herman 2006, p. 154; Thom, Herman & Woods, § B
Untitled: ("Moonlight and shadows barred the land")	8	Moonlight and shadows barred the land	The Last of the Trunk Och Brev I Urval	Mar 2007		Wikisource	Letter:^{K} Tevis Clyde Smith, c. late 1928 (Herman 2006, p. 227); PD^{L}	Herman 2006, p. 227
Untitled: ("The moonlight glimmered white")	91	The moonlight glimmered white across the sands	A Rhyme of Salem Town and Other Poems	2002	Mine But to Serve		Tentative title^{B} (Lord 1976, p. 306)	Lord 1976, p. 306; Herman 2006, p. 185
Untitled: ("Moses was our leader")	64 + a 12-line revision	Moses was our leader	Shadows of Dreams	1989	The Odyssey of Israel		Letter:^{K} Tevis Clyde Smith, c. March 1926 (Herman 2006, p. 189); In multiple parts, part of a projected longer work (Herman 2006, p. 189)	Herman 2006, p. 189
Untitled: ("Mother Eve, Mother Eve, I name you a fool")	4	Mother Eve, Mother Eve, I name you a fool	The Collected Letters of Robert E. Howard, Volume 1: 1923-1929	Jun 2007		Wikisource	Letter:^{K} Tevis Clyde Smith, c. January 1928 (Herman 2006, p. 227); PD^{L}	Herman 2006, p. 227
Untitled: ("Murky the night")	7	Murky the night	A Rhyme of Salem Town and Other Poems	2002			Unfinished (Lord 1976, p. 312)	Lord 1976, p. 312; Herman 2006, p. 227
Untitled: ("My brother he was an auctioneer")	56	My brother he was an auctioneer	The Last of the Trunk Och Brev I Urval	Mar 2007		Wikisource	Letter:^{K} Tevis Clyde Smith, c. November–December 1928 (Herman 2006, p. 227); PD^{L}	Herman 2006, p. 227
Untitled: ("My brothers are blond and calm of speech")	16	My brothers are blond and calm of speech	Verses in Ebony	1975	Alien			Lord 1976, p. 300; Herman 2006, pp. 148–149; Thom, Herman & Woods, § A
Untitled: ("My heart is a silver drum tonight")	14	My heart is a silver drum tonight	Shadows of Dreams	1989			Letter:^{K} Tevis Clyde Smith, c. November 1928 (Herman 2006, p. 156)	The Call of PanHerman 2006, p. 156; Thom, Herman & Woods, § C
Untitled: ("My name is Baal; I walked the earth of yore")	57	My name is Baal; I walked the earth of yore	A Rhyme of Salem Town and Other Poems	2002	Baal		Tentative title^{B} (Lord 1976, p. 301)	Lord 1976, p. 301; Herman 2006, p. 151; Thom, Herman & Woods, § B
Untitled: ("Mystic Lore")	4	A wizard who dwelt by Drumnakill	A Rhyme of Salem Town and Other Poems	2002	Untitled: ("A wizard who dwelt by Drumnakill")		Tentative title^{B} (Lord 1976, p. 306)	Lord 1976, p. 306; Herman 2006, p. 187
Untitled: "Never Beyond the Beast"	16	Rise to the peak of the ladder	The Ghost Ocean and Other Poems of the Supernatural	1982	Untitled: ("Rise to the peak of the ladder")		Tentative title^{B} (Lord 1976, p. 306)	Lord 1976, p. 306; Herman 2006, pp. 187–188
Untitled: ("Night falls")	18	Night falls	Weirdbook #11	1977	Nocturne		Tentative title^{B} (Lord 1976, p. 308)	Lord 1976, p. 308; Herman 2006, p. 188
Untitled: ("Night in the county of Donegal")	28	Night in the county of Donegal	A Rhyme of Salem Town and Other Poems	2002	Farewell, Proud Munster		Tentative title^{B} (Lord 1976, p. 304); An early work^{C} (Lord 1976, p. 304)	Lord 1976, p. 304; Herman 2006, p. 168
Untitled: The Night Winds	32	The night winds whisper across the grass	Verses in Ebony	1975	("The night winds whisper across the grass")		Tentative title^{B} (Lord 1976, p. 306)	Lord 1976, p. 306; Herman 2006, p. 188
Untitled: ("The night winds whisper across the grass")	32	The night winds whisper across the grass	Verses in Ebony	1975	The Night Winds		Tentative title^{B} (Lord 1976, p. 306)	Lord 1976, p. 306; Herman 2006, p. 188
Untitled: Nisapur	20	The day that towers, sapphire kissed	Always Comes Evening	1957	Untitled: ("The day that towers, sapphire kissed")	"Nisapur"	Originally untitled (Lord 1976, p. 181)	Lord 1976, p. 181; Herman 2006, p. 188
Untitled: ("No Man's Land")	28	Across the wastes of No Man's Land, the grey-clad slayers came	A Rhyme of Salem Town and Other Poems	2002	Untitled ("Across the wastes of No Man's Land")		c(Lord 1976, p. 308)	Lord 1976, p. 308; Herman 2006, p. 188
Untitled: No More the Serpent Prow	8	The House of Asgard passes with the night	The Howard Collector #14	Spring 1971	Untitled: ("The House of Asgard passes with the night")		Tentative title^{B} Originally untitled (Lord 1976, p. 181)	Lord 1976, p. 181; Herman 2006, p. 188
Untitled: ("'No more!' they swear")	10	"No more!" they swear; I laugh to hear them speak	The Howard Collector #18	Autumn 1973	The Legacy of Tubal-Cain		Originally untitled (Lord 1976, p. 179)	Lord 1976, p. 179; Herman 2006, p. 180
Untitled: ("Noah was my applesauce")	24	Noah was my applesauce	The Collected Letters of Robert E. Howard, Volume 1: 1923-1929	Jun 2007		Wikisource	Letter:^{K} Tevis Clyde Smith, c. November 1928 (Herman 2006, p. 227); PD^{L}	Herman 2006, p. 227
Untitled: "Nocturne"	18	Night falls	Weirdbook #11	1977	Untitled: ("Night falls")		Tentative title^{B} (Lord 1976, p. 308)	Lord 1976, p. 308; Herman 2006, p. 188
Untitled: "Now and Then"	9	'Twas twice a hundred centuries ago	A Rhyme of Salem Town and Other Poems	2002	Untitled: ("'Twas twice a hundred centuries ago")		Tentative title^{B} (Lord 1976, p. 308); Unfinished (Lord 1976, p. 308)	Lord 1976, p. 308; Herman 2006, pp. 188–189
Untitled: ("Now anthropoid and leprous shadows lope")	18	Now anthropoid and leprous shadows lope	Amazing Stories	Mar 1986	All Hallows Eve		Tentative title^{B} (Lord 1976, p. 300)	Lord 1976, p. 300; Herman 2006, p. 149; Thom, Herman & Woods, § A
Untitled: ("Now bright, now red, the sabers sped")	8	Now bright, now red, the sabers sped among the	The Last of the Trunk Och Brev I Urval	Mar 2007		Wikisource	Letter:^{K} Tevis Clyde Smith, June 23, 1923 (Herman 2006, p. 228); PD^{L}	Herman 2006, p. 228
Untitled: ("Now come the days of high endeavor")	98	Now come the days of high endeavor and / The blare of brazen trumpets through the land.	Shadows of Dreams	1989	A Fable for Critics		Letter:^{K} Tevis Clyde Smith, ca. November–December 1928	
Untitled: ("Now hark to this tale of long ago")	19	Now hark to this tale of long ago	A Rhyme of Salem Town and Other Poems	2002	When Men Were Bold		Tentative title^{B} (Lord 1976, p. 313); An early work^{C} (Lord 1976, p. 313); Unfinished (Lord 1976, p. 313)	Lord 1976, p. 313; Herman 2006, p. 238
Untitled: ("Now is a summer come out of the sea")	24	Now is a summer come out of the sea	Amra (vol. 2, no. 8)	Nov-December 1959	But the Hills Were Ancient Then	Wikisource	Originally untitled (Lord 1976, p. 171); Title created by George Scithers (Herman 2006, p. 156); PD^{L}	Lord 1976, p. 171; Herman 2006, p. 156; Thom, Herman & Woods, § B
Untitled: ("Now that the kings have fallen")	32	Now that the kings have fallen	The Howard Collector #11	Spring 1969	Where Are Your Knights, Donn Othna?		Originally untitled (Lord 1976, p. 191)	Lord 1976, p. 191; Herman 2006, p. 239
Untitled: ("Now the stars are all gleaming ...")	32	Now the stars are all gleaming	The Collected Letters of Robert E. Howard, Volume 1: 1923-1929	Jun 2007	Untitled: ("Now the stars are all gleaming ...")		Mnemonic reconstruction^{V} Letter:^{K} Robert W. Gordon, May 14, 1928; Howard's rendition of "a song I heard once some time ago and have heard only once," sung to him by a "wandering willy" to whom he'd given a lift; NOT INCLUDED IN COLLECTED POETRY	
Untitled: O the Brave Sea-Rover	4	Ah, the rover hides in Aves when he runs	A Rhyme of Salem Town and Other Poems	2002	Untitled: ("Ah, the rover hides in Aves when he runs")		Tentative title^{B} (Lord 1976, p. 308); An early work^{C} (Lord 1976, p. 308)	Lord 1976, p. 308; Herman 2006, p. 189
Untitled: "The Oaks"	5	The great grey oaks by the banks of the river	A Rhyme of Salem Town and Other Poems	2002	Untitled: ("The great grey oaks by the banks of the river")		Tentative title^{B} (Lord 1976, p. 308)	Lord 1976, p. 308; Herman 2006, p. 189
Untitled: "The Odyssey of Israel"	64 + a 12-line revision	Moses was our leader	Shadows of Dreams	1989	Untitled: ("Moses was our leader")		Letter:^{K} Tevis Clyde Smith, c. March 1926 (Herman 2006, p. 189); In multiple parts, part of a projected longer work (Herman 2006, p. 189)	Herman 2006, p. 189
Untitled: ("O'er lakes agleam the old gods dream")	8	O'er lakes agleam the old gods dream	Always Comes Evening	1957	Chant of the White Beard		From:^{T} Men of the Shadows (Lord 1976, p. 172); Originally untitled (Lord 1976, p. 172); From:^{T} Men of the Shadows (Herman 2006, p. 157)	Lord 1976, p. 172; Herman 2006, p. 157; Thom, Herman & Woods, § C
Untitled: ("Oh, the road to glory lay")	4	Oh, the road to glory lay	n/a	n/a			From:^{T} The Pit of the Serpent (attributed to Mushy Hansen) (Herman 2006, p. 228); Never published separately (Herman 2006, p. 228)	Herman 2006, p. 228
Untitled: ("Oh, we are little children ...")	2	Oh, we are little children ...					Letter:^{K} Tevis Clyde Smith, c. November 1928 (Herman 2006, p. 228); From:^{T} People of the Winged Skulls (Herman 2006, p. 228)	Herman 2006, p. 228
Untitled: ("Oh, ye who tread the narrow way")	4	Oh, ye who tread the narrow way	A Rhyme of Salem Town and Other Poems	2002	Exhortation		Tentative title^{B} (Lord 1976, p. 304); An early work^{C} (Lord 1976, p. 304)	Lord 1976, p. 304; Herman 2006, p. 167
Untitled: ("Old Faro Bill was a man of might")	20	Old Faro Bill was a man of might	The Collected Letters of Robert E. Howard, Volume 1: 1923-1929	Jun 2007		Wikisource	Letter:^{K} Tevis Clyde Smith, c. November 1928 (Herman 2006, p. 228); PD^{L}	Herman 2006, p. 228
Untitled: "On With the Play"	14	Up with the curtain, lo, the stage is set	The Howard Collector #17	Autumn 1972	Untitled: ("Up with the curtain, lo, the stage is set")		Originally untitled (Lord 1976, p. 182)	Lord 1976, p. 182; Herman 2006, p. 190
Untitled: ("One slept beneath the branches dim")	44	One slept beneath the branches dim	Red Shadows	1968	The Return of Sir Richard Grenville		Originally untitled (Lord 1976, p. 183); A Solomon Kane poem	Lord 1976, p. 183; Herman 2006, p. 196
Untitled: "Only a Shadow on the Grass"	4	The tribes of men rise up and pass	Weirdbook #13	1978	Untitled: ("The tribes of men rise up and pass")		Tentative title^{B} (Lord 1976, p. 308)	Lord 1976, p. 308; Herman 2006, p. 190
Untitled: ("Out in front of Goldstein's")	8, plus seven additional 2-line choruses—22 lines total	Out in front of Goldstein's	The Last of the Trunk Och Brev I Urval	Mar 2007		Wikisource	Letter:^{K} Tevis Clyde Smith, c. December 1928 (Herman 2006, p. 228); PD^{L}	Herman 2006, p. 228
Untitled: ("Out of Asia the tribesmen came")	4	Out of Asia the tribesmen came	The Cross Plainsman	Aug 2004		Wikisource	Letter:^{K} Tevis Clyde Smith, July 30, 1923 (Herman 2006, p. 229); PD^{L}; In addition to the opening 8-line song parody of "East Side, West Side (The Sidewalks of New York)," there are also seven two-line choruses scattered throughout the letter	Herman 2006, p. 228
Untitled: ("Out of the Texas desert")	31	Out of the Texas desert, over the Rio Grande	A Rhyme of Salem Town and Other Poems	2002	The Bandit		Tentative title^{B} (Lord 1976, p. 301); An early work^{C} (Lord 1976, p. 301)	Lord 1976, p. 301; Herman 2006, p. 153; Thom, Herman & Woods, § B
Untitled: "The Outcast"	12	Forth from the purple and feats of the palace	The Grim Land and Others	1976	Untitled: ("Forth from the purple")		Tentative title^{B} (Lord 1976, p. 308)	Lord 1976, p. 308; Herman 2006, p. 191
Untitled: "An Outworn Story"	21	There come long days when the soul turns sick	Fantasy Tales	Summer 1987	Untitled: ("There come long days when the soul turns sick")		Tentative title^{B} (Lord 1976, p. 308); British^{P} (Herman 2006, p. 184)	Lord 1976, p. 308; Herman 2006, p. 191
Untitled: ("Over the hills the winds of the seas")	14	Over the hills the winds of the seas	A Rhyme of Salem Town and Other Poems	2002	The Winds of the Sea, The (1)^{N}		Tentative title^{B} (Lord 1976, p. 314)	Lord 1976, p. 314; Herman 2006, p. 240
Untitled: ("Over the hills the winds of the seas") (2)^{N}	16	Over the hills the winds of the seas	The Last of the Trunk Och Brev I Urval	Mar 2007	The Winds of the Sea			Herman 2006, p. 240
Untitled: ("Over the old Rio Grandey")	12	Over the old Rio Grandey	A Rhyme of Salem Town and Other Poems	2002	Over the Old Rio Grandey		Tentative title^{B} (Lord 1976, p. 308); An early work^{C} (Lord 1976, p. 308)	Lord 1976, p. 308; Herman 2006, p. 192
Untitled: ("Over the place the lights go out")	47	Over the place the lights go out	Robert E. Howard's Fight Magazine #4	Oct 1996	In the Ring		Tentative title^{B} (Lord 1976, p. 307)	Lord 1976, p. 307; Herman 2006, p. 175
Untitled: ("Palm-trees are waving in the Gulf breeze")	putatively 36 lines, when divided into couplets, but some lines and stanzas are written across the page like prose	Palm-trees are waving in the Gulf breeze	Austin, vol. 3, no. 1	May 1992			Letter:^{K} Tevis Clyde Smith, September 7, 1924 (Herman 2006, p. 229); Distributed as part of REHUPA #115 (Herman 2006, p. 229)	Herman 2006, p. 229
Untitled: Passing of the Elder Gods	4	The elder gods have fled	A Rhyme of Salem Town and Other Poems	2002	Untitled: ("The elder gods have fled")		Tentative title^{B} (Lord 1976, p. 308)	Lord 1976, p. 308; Herman 2006, p. 192
Untitled: "The Phantoms Gather"	6	Up over the cromlech and down the rath	A Rhyme of Salem Town and Other Poems	2002	Untitled: ("Up over the cromlech")		Tentative title^{B} (Lord 1976, p. 308)	Lord 1976, p. 308; Herman 2006, p. 192
Untitled: "The Phases of Life"	5	Life is the same, yet of many phases	Unaussprechlichen Kulten #2	Jul 1992	Untitled: ("Life is the same, yet of many phases")		Tentative title^{B} (Lord 1976, p. 308); French^{P} (Herman 2006, p. 192)	Lord 1976, p. 308; Herman 2006, p. 192
Untitled: "The Plains of Gilban"	12	Red swirls the dust	A Rhyme of Salem Town and Other Poems	2002	Untitled: ("Red swirls the dust")		Tentative title^{B} (Lord 1976, p. 309)	Lord 1976, p. 309; Herman 2006, p. 193
Untitled: "Prelude"	4	I caught Joan alone upon her bed	A Rhyme of Salem Town and Other Poems	2002	Untitled: ("I caught Joan alone upon her bed")		Tentative title^{B} (Lord 1976, p. 309)	Lord 1976, p. 309; Herman 2006, p. 193
Untitled: "Prince and Beggar"	18	I was a prince of China, lord of a million spears	Always Comes Evening	1957	Untitled: ("I was a prince of China")		Originally untitled (Lord 1976, p. 182)	Lord 1976, p. 182; Herman 2006, p. 194
Untitled: ("Ramona! Romona!")	4	Romona! Romona!	The Last of the Trunk Och Brev I Urval	Mar 2007	Untitled: ("Romona! Romona!")	Wikisource	Letter:^{K} Tevis Clyde Smith, c. November–December 1928 (Herman 2006, p. 229); "Ramona" spelling a probable typo?; PD^{L}	Herman 2006, p. 229
Untitled: ("Rattle of drums")	48	Rattle of drums	A Rhyme of Salem Town and Other Poems	2002	Rattle of Drums		Tentative title^{B} (Lord 1976, p. 309)	Lord 1976, p. 309; Herman 2006, p. 194
Untitled: ("Rebel souls from the falling dark")	8	Rebel souls from the falling dark	The Collected Letters of Robert E. Howard, Volume 1: 1923-1929	Jun 2007		Wikisource	Letter:^{K} Tevis Clyde Smith, c. November 1928 (Herman 2006, p. 229); PD^{L}	Herman 2006, p. 229
Untitled: ("Red swirls the dust")	12	Red swirls the dust	A Rhyme of Salem Town and Other Poems	2002	The Plains of Gilban		Tentative title^{B} (Lord 1976, p. 309)	Lord 1976, p. 309; Herman 2006, p. 193
Untitled: Retribution	22	The moon above the Kerry hills			Retribution; The Song of Murtagh O'Brien; Black Michael's Story Untitled: ("The moon above the Kerry hills")			Herman 2006, p. 154; Thom, Herman & Woods, § B
Untitled: The Return of Sir Richard Grenville	44	One slept beneath the branches dim	Red Shadows	1968	Untitled: ("One slept beneath the branches dim")		Originally untitled (Lord 1976, p. 183); A Solomon Kane poem	Lord 1976, p. 183; Herman 2006, p. 196
Untitled: ("The Return of the Sea-Farer")	36	Thorfinn, Thorfinn, where have you been?	Weirdbook #13	1978	Untitled: ("Thorfinn, Thorfinn, where have you been?")			Lord 1976, p. 309; Herman 2006, p. 196
Untitled: A Rhyme of Salem Town and Other Poems	74	As I went down to Salem town, I met good Mistress Meek	Untitled: ("As I went down to Salem town, I met good Mistress Meek")	2002	A Rhyme of Salem Town		Tentative title^{B} (Lord 1976, p. 309)	Lord 1976, p. 309; Herman 2006, p. 197
Untitled: ("Rise to the peak of the ladder")	16	Rise to the peak of the ladder	The Ghost Ocean and Other Poems of the Supernatural	1982	Never Beyond the Beast		Tentative title^{B} (Lord 1976, p. 306)	Lord 1976, p. 306; Herman 2006, pp. 187–188
Untitled: Road to Hell, The	28	Along the road that leads to Hell	Singers in the Shadows	1970	Untitled: ("Along the road that leads to Hell")	Wikisource	Lines 1-4 similar to lines 69-72 of The Dust Dance (version 1) (Lord 1976, p. 184); PD^{L} Tentative title^{B}	Lord 1976, p. 184; Herman 2006, p. 198
Untitled: "Roads"	4	I too have strode those white-paved roads that run	The Howard Collector #17	Autumn 1972	Untitled: ("I too have strode those white-paved roads")		Originally untitled (Lord 1976, p. 184)	Lord 1976, p. 184; Herman 2006, p. 199
Untitled: ("Roar, silver trumpets")	8	Roar, silver trumpets, in your pride	Night Images	1976	Roar, Silver Trumpets		Tentative title^{B} (Lord 1976, p. 309)	Lord 1976, p. 309; Herman 2006, p. 199
Untitled: ("Romona! Romona!")	4	Romona! Romona!	The Last of the Trunk Och Brev I Urval	Mar 2007	Untitled: ("Ramona! Romona!")	Wikisource	Letter:^{K} Tevis Clyde Smith, c. November–December 1928 (Herman 2006, p. 229); PD^{L}	Herman 2006, p. 229
Untitled: ("Roses laughed in her pretty hair")	10	Roses laughed in her pretty hair	The Collected Letters of Robert E. Howard, Volume 1: 1923-1929	Jun 2007		Wikisource	Letter:^{K} Tevis Clyde Smith, August 28, 1925 (Herman 2006, p. 229); PD^{L}	Herman 2006, p. 229
Untitled: "Rune"	34	Gods of heather, gods of lake	Always Comes Evening	1957	Rune of the Ancient One; Untitled: ("Gods of heather, gods of lake")	"Rune"	From:^{T} Men of the Shadows (Lord 1976, p. 185); Originally untitled (Lord 1976, p. 185); Separate version called Rune of the Ancient One (Herman 2006, p. 200)	Lord 1976, p. 185; Herman 2006, p. 200
Untitled: "Rune of the Ancient One"	34	Gods of heather, gods of lake	Always Comes Evening	1957	Rune; Untitled: ("Gods of heather, gods of lake")	"Rune"	From:^{T} Men of the Shadows (Lord 1976, p. 185); Originally untitled (Lord 1976, p. 185); Separate version called Rune of the Ancient One (Herman 2006, p. 200)	Lord 1976, p. 185; Herman 2006, p. 200
Untitled: "The Sand-Hills' Crest"	39	Here where the post oaks crown the ridge, and the dreary sand-drifts lie	A Robert E. Howard Memorial: June 13–15, 1986	1986	Untitled: ("Here where the post oaks crown the ridge")		Tentative title^{B} (Lord 1976, p. 310)	Lord 1976, p. 310; Herman 2006, p. 201
Untitled: ("A sappe ther wos and that a crumbe manne")	16	A sappe ther wos and that a crumbe manne	The Collected Letters of Robert E. Howard, Volume 1: 1923-1929	Jun 2007		Wikisource	Letter:^{K} Tevis Clyde Smith, c. November 1928 (Herman 2006, p. 230); PD^{L}	Herman 2006, p. 230
Untitled: ("Sappho, the Grecian hills are gold")	4	Sappho, the Grecian hills are gold	The Last of the Trunk Och Brev I Urval	Mar 2007		Wikisource	Letter:^{K} Tevis Clyde Smith, c. November–December 1928 (Herman 2006, p. 230); PD^{L}	Herman 2006, p. 230
Untitled: ("Scarlet and gold are the stars tonight")	8	Scarlet and gold are the stars tonight	The Cross Plainsman	Aug 2004 (last four lines only) / The Collected Letters of Robert E. Howard, Volume 1: 1923-1929 (first full appearance)	Adventures	Wikisource	Letter:^{K} Tevis Clyde Smith, c. November 1928 (Herman 2006, p. 230); PD^{L}	Herman 2006, p. 230
Untitled: "Sea-Chant"	4	Topaz seas and laughing skies	A Rhyme of Salem Town and Other Poems	2002	Untitled: ("Topaz seas and laughing skies")		Tentative title^{B} (Lord 1976, p. 310)	Lord 1976, p. 310; Herman 2006, p. 202
Untitled: ("The shades of night were falling faster")	6	The shades of night were falling faster	The Last of the Trunk Och Brev I Urval	Mar 2007		Wikisource	Letter:^{K} Tevis Clyde Smith, April 14, 1926 (Herman 2006, p. 230); PD^{L}	Herman 2006, p. 230
Untitled "Shadow Thing"	28	There was a thing of the shadow world	The Ghost Ocean and Other Poems of the Supernatural	1982	Untitled ("There was a thing of the shadow world")		Tentative title^{B} (Lord 1976, p. 310); From:^{T} Untitled, begins "As he approached the two..." (Lord 1976, p. 310)/(Herman 2006, p. 203)	Lord 1976, p. 310; Herman 2006, p. 203
Untitled: ("She came in the dim of the desert dawn")	36	She came in the dim of the desert dawn	Lone Star Universe	1976	Coming of Bast, The; Untitled: "She came in the dim of the desert dawn ..."		Letter:^{K} Tevis Clyde Smith, undated, a version (Herman 2006, p. 158)	Lord 1976, p. 302; Herman 2006, p. 158; Thom, Herman & Woods, § C
Untitled: ("She came in the grey of the desert dawn")	46	She came in the grey of the desert dawn	The Collected Letters Of Robert E. Howard, Volume 3: 1933–1936	2008	Coming of Bast, The—draft; Untitled: "She came in the grey of the desert dawn ..."		Letter:^{K} Tevis Clyde Smith, undated, beginning "Ha, Ha! Your not going ..." (Herman 2006, p. 158)	Lord 1976, p. 302; Herman 2006, p. 158; Thom, Herman & Woods, § C
Untitled: "The Slayer"	24	The women come and the women go	Slayer, The; A Rhyme of Salem Town and Other Poems	2002	Untitled: ("The women come and the women go")	Wikisource	Letter:^{K} Tevis Clyde Smith, c. December 1928 (Herman 2006, p. 205); PD^{L}	Herman 2006, p. 205
Untitled: "A Song from an Ebony Heart"	44	The wine in my cup is bitter dregs	Shadows of Dreams	1989	Untitled: ("The wine in my cup is bitter dregs")		Letter:^{K} Tevis Clyde Smith; c. November 1928)	Herman 2006, p. 207
Untitled "Song of a Fugitive Bard"	30	They gave me a dollar and thirty cents when they let me outa my cell	Shadows of Dreams	1989	Untitled ("They gave me a dollar and thirty cents")		Letter:^{K} Tevis Clyde Smith; c. June 1928)	Herman 2006, p. 207
Untitled: A Song of Bards	5	Chesterton twanged on his lyre	A Rhyme of Salem Town and Other Poems	2002	s Untitled: ("Chesterton twanged on his lyre")		Tentative title^{B} (Lord 1976, p. 311)	Lord 1976, p. 311; Herman 2006, p. 208
Untitled: A Song of Defeat	28		Magazine of Horror #34	Fall 1970	Untitled: ("We are they")		Originally untitled (Lord 1976, p. 187)	Lord 1976, p. 187; Herman 2006, p. 208
Untitled: The Song of Murtagh O'Brien	22	The moon above the Kerry hills			Black Michael's Story; Untitled: ("The moon above the Kerry hills"); Retribution;			Herman 2006, p. 154; Thom, Herman & Woods, § B
Untitled: ("A Song of the Naked Lands")	92	You lolled in gardens where breezes fanned	A Song of the Naked Lands (chapbook)	1973	Untitled: ("You lolled in gardens")		Originally untitled (Lord 1976, p. 188)	Lord 1976, p. 188; Herman 2006, p. 209
Untitled: "Song of the Pict"	14	Wolf on the height	Always Comes Evening	1957	Untitled: ("Wolf on the height")	"Song of the Pict"	From:^{T} Men of the Shadows (Lord 1976, p. 188); Originally untitled (Lord 1976, p. 188)	Lord 1976, p. 188; Herman 2006, p. 209
Untitled: "A Song of the Race"	72	High on this throne sat Bran Mak Morn	Bran Mak Morn	Sep 1969	Untitled: ("High on this throne sat Bran Mak Morn")		Originally untitled (Lord 1976, p. 188); A Bran Mak Morn poem	Lord 1976, p. 188; Herman 2006, p. 210
Untitled: ("The spiders of weariness come on me")	4	The spiders of weariness come on me	The Collected Letters of Robert E. Howard, Volume 1: 1923-1929	Jun 2007		Wikisource	Letter:^{K} Tevis Clyde Smith, c. March 1928 (Herman 2006, p. 230); PD^{L}	Herman 2006, p. 230
Untitled: "The Stralsund"	5	He has rigged her and tricked her	A Rhyme of Salem Town and Other Poems	2002	Untitled: ("He has rigged her and tricked her")		Tentative title^{B} (Lord 1976, p. 311)	Lord 1976, p. 311; Herman 2006, p. 211
Untitled: ("Strange Passion")	34	Ah, I know black queens whose passions blaze	Risque Stories #1	Mar 1984	Untitled: ("Ah, I know black queens"		Tentative title^{B} (Lord 1976, p. 311)	Lord 1976, p. 311; Herman 2006, p. 211
Untitled: "Summer Morn"	5	Am-ra stood on a mountain height	Kull: Exile of Atlantis	Oct 2006	Untitled: ("Am-ra stood on a mountain height")	Wikisource	Tentative title^{B} (Lord 1976, p. 311); PD^{L}	Lord 1976, p. 311; Herman 2006, p. 21
Untitled: "The Sword of Lal Singh"	24	Men I have slain with naked steel	A Rhyme of Salem Town and Other Poems	2002	Untitled: ("Men I have slain with naked steel")		Tentative title^{B} (Lord 1976, p. 311); An early work^{C} (Lord 1976, p. 311)	Lord 1976, p. 311; Herman 2006, p. 212
Untitled: ("Swords glimmered up the pass")	93	Swords glimmered up the pass	The Collected Letters of Robert E. Howard, Volume 1: 1923-1929	Jun 2007		Wikisource	Letter:^{K} Tevis Clyde Smith, c. November 1928 (Herman 2006, p. 231); PD^{L}	Herman 2006, p. 231
Untitled: "The Symbol"	24	Eons before Atlantean days in the time of the world's black dawn	Ariel^{[Horror]}	Autumn 1976^{[Horror]}	Untitled: ("Eons before Atlantean days")		Tentative title^{B} (Lord 1976, p. 311)	Lord 1976, p. 311; Herman 2006, p. 212; Howard 2008, p. x
Untitled: ("Take some honey from a cat")	5	Take some honey from a cat	The Last of the Trunk Och Brev I Urval	Mar 2007		Wikisource	Letter:^{K} Tevis Clyde Smith, c. August–September 1927 (Herman 2006, p. 231); PD^{L}	Herman 2006, p. 231
Untitled: ("")		The tall man answered: ...					Letter:^{K} Tevis Clyde Smith, c. November 1928 (Herman 2006, p. 231); From:^{T} People of the Winged Skulls (Herman 2006, p. 231)	Herman 2006, p. 231
Untitled: ("")		The tall man rose and said: ...					Letter:^{K} Tevis Clyde Smith, c. November 1928 (Herman 2006, p. 231); From:^{T} People of the Winged Skulls (Herman 2006, p. 231)	Herman 2006, p. 231
Untitled: ("")		The tall man said: ...					Letter:^{K} Tevis Clyde Smith, c. November 1928 (Herman 2006, p. 231); From:^{T} People of the Winged Skulls (Herman 2006, p. 231)	Herman 2006, p. 231
Untitled: ("Tell me not in coocoo numbers")	4	Tell me not in coocoo numbers	The Collected Letters of Robert E. Howard, Volume 1: 1923-1929	Jun 2007			Letter:^{K} Tevis Clyde Smith, c. October 1927 (Herman 2006, p. 231); From the story The Fastidious Fooey Mancucu (Herman 2006, p. 231)	Herman 2006, p. 231|
Untitled: ("That is no land for weaklings")	28	That is no land for weaklings, no land for coward or fool	A Rhyme of Salem Town and Other Poems	2002	Zululand		Tentative title^{B} (Lord 1976, p. 314); An early work^{C} (Lord 1976, p. 314)	Lord 1976, p. 314; Herman 2006, p. 242
Untitled: ("Then Stein the peddler with rising joy")	14	Then Stein the peddler with rising joy	The Last of the Trunk Och Brev I Urval	Mar 2007		Wikisource	Letter:^{K} Tevis Clyde Smith, c. July 1930 (Herman 2006, p. 231); PD^{L}	Herman 2006, p. 231
Untitled: ("There are grim things did")	44	There are grim things did	The Last of the Trunk Och Brev I Urval	Mar 2007	The Ballad of Singapore Nell—draft		Letter:^{K} Tevis Clyde Smith, undated (Herman 2006, p. 231); From a draft of The Ballad of Singapore Nell (Herman 2006, p. 231)	Herman 2006, p. 231
Untitled: ("There burns in me no honeyed drop of love")	4	There burns in me no honeyed drop of love	Always Comes Evening	1957	Invective	"Invective"		Lord 1976, p. 177; Herman 2006, p. 175
Untitled: ("There come long days when the soul turns sick")	21	There come long days when the soul turns sick	Fantasy Tales	Summer 1987	An Outworn Story		Tentative title^{B} (Lord 1976, p. 308); British^{P} (Herman 2006, p. 184)	Lord 1976, p. 308; Herman 2006, p. 191
Untitled: ("There is a misty sea beneath the earth")	6	There is a misty sea beneath the earth	A Rhyme of Salem Town and Other Poems	2002	A Misty Sea		Tentative title^{B} (Lord 1976, p. 306)	Lord 1976, p. 306; Herman 2006, p. 185
Untitled: ("There is a sea and a silent moon")	16	There is a sea and a silent moon	The Ghost Ocean and Other Poems of the Supernatural	1982	The Ghost Ocean		Tentative title^{B} (Lord 1976, p. 304)	Lord 1976, p. 304; Herman 2006, p. 171
Untitled: ("There is a strangeness in my soul")	60	There is a strangeness in my soul	Rhymes of Death	1975	Ecstasy		Tentative title^{B} (Lord 1976, p. 303); shares some stanzas with "A cringing woman's lot is hard"	Lord 1976, p. 303; Herman 2006, p. 166
Untitled: ("There once was a wicked old elf")	5 (limerick)	There once was a wicked old elf	The Last of the Trunk Och Brev I Urval	Mar 2007		Wikisource	Letter:^{K} Tevis Clyde Smith, undated (Herman 2006, p. 232); PD^{L}	Herman 2006, p. 232
Untitled ("There was a thing of the shadow world")	28	There was a thing of the shadow world	The Ghost Ocean and Other Poems of the Supernatural	1982	Shadow Thing		Tentative title^{B} (Lord 1976, p. 310); From:^{T} Untitled, begins "As he approached the two..." (Lord 1976, p. 310)/(Herman 2006, p. 203)	Lord 1976, p. 310; Herman 2006, p. 203
Untitled ("There was a young girl from Siberia")	15	There was a young girl from Siberia	Desire and Other Erotic Poems	1989	Limericks to Spank By		Tentative title^{B} (Lord 1976, p. 305); Three 5-line limericks (Herman 2006, p. 181)	Lord 1976, p. 305; Herman 2006, p. 181
Untitled ("There was an old dick whose name was Stiff")	2 4-line ditties for a total of 8 lines	There was an old dick whose name was Stiff	THE LAST OF THE TRUNK OCH BREV I URVAL				Letter:^{K} Tevis Clyde Smith, ca. March 1929; contained in the untitled story "Hatrack!"; titled with the first line in COLLECTED POETRY	
Untitled ("There were three lads who went their destined ways")	53	There were three lads who went their destined ways	The Last of the Trunk Och Brev I Urval	Mar 2007		wikisource	Letter:^{K} Tevis Clyde Smith, undated (Herman 2006, p. 232); PD^{L}	Herman 2006, p. 232
Untitled ("There's a bell that hangs in a hidden cave")	24	There's a bell that hangs in a hidden cave	Bran Mak Morn — The Last King	2001	The Bell of Morni		Tentative title^{B} (Lord 1976, p. 301)	Lord 1976, p. 301; Herman 2006, p. 153; Thom, Herman & Woods, § B
Untitled ("There's a calling and a calling and a calling")	8	There's a calling and a calling	A Rhyme of Salem Town and Other Poems	2002	Untitled ("There's a calling and a calling and a calling")		Tentative title^{B} (Lord 1976, p. 301)	Lord 1976, p. 301; Herman 2006, p. 156; Thom, Herman & Woods, § C
Untitled ("There's an isle far away on the breast of the sea")	24	There's an isle far away on the breast of the sea	The Last of the Trunk Och Brev I Urval	Mar 2007		Wikisource	Letter:^{K} Tevis Clyde Smith, c. December 1928 (Herman 2006, p. 232); PD^{L}	Herman 2006, p. 232
Untitled ("They break from the pack")	24	They break from the pack and seek their own track	A Rhyme of Salem Town and Other Poems	2002	Untamed Avatars		Tentative title^{B} (Lord 1976, p. 312)	Lord 1976, p. 312; Herman 2006, p. 217
Untitled: ("They came to a village which lay / Within a king's domains ...")	27	They came to a village which lay / Within a king's domains	The Collected Letters of Robert E. Howard, Volume 1: 1923-1929	Jun 2007	The Search		Mnemonic reconstruction^{V} of "The Search" by Edgar Lee Masters; Letter:^{K} Robert W. Gordon, February 4, 1925; NOT INCLUDED IN COLLECTED POETRY	
Untitled ("They cast her out of the court of the king")	44	They cast her out of the court of the king	Chacal #2	Spring 1977	Daughter of Evil		Letter:^{K} Tevis Clyde Smith, c. September 1930 (Herman 2006, p. 160); Tentative title^{B} (Lord 1976, p. 302)	Lord 1976, p. 302; Herman 2006, p. 160
Untitled ("They gave me a dollar and thirty cents")	30	They gave me a dollar and thirty cents when they let me outa my cell	Shadows of Dreams	1989	Song of a Fugitive Bard		Letter:^{K} Tevis Clyde Smith; c. June 1928)	Herman 2006, p. 207
Untitled ("They matched me up that night")	24	They matched me up that night	The Last of the Trunk Och Brev I Urval	Mar 2007		Wikisource	Letter:^{K} Tevis Clyde Smith, c. June 1928 (Herman 2006, p. 233); PD^{L}	Herman 2006, p. 233
Untitled ("They were there, in the distance dreaming")	4	They were there, in the distance dreaming	Dear HPL: Letters, Robert E. Howard to H.P. Lovecraft, 1933-1936	2002			Letter:^{K} H. P. Lovecraft, April 23, 1933 (Herman 2006, p. 233)	Herman 2006, p. 233
Untitled ("This is a young world")		This is a young world	The Right Hook,^{I} vol. 1, #3	1925				Herman 2006, p. 233
Untitled: ("This is the tale of a nameless fight")	1,046	This is the tale of a nameless fight	The Ballad of King Geraint	1989	The Ballad of King Geraint		Tentative title^{B} (Lord 1976, p. 301); Title provided by Lenore Preece (Herman 2006, p. 153); Letter:^{K} Harold Preece, January 4, 1930 (Herman 2006, p. 153)	Lord 1976, p. 301; Herman 2006, p. 153; Thom, Herman & Woods, § B
Untitled: ("This is the tale the Kaffirs tell")	28	This is the tale the Kaffirs tell as the tints of twilight melt	Fantasy Tales	Winter 1983	"The Zulu Lord"		Tentative title^{B} (Lord 1976, p. 314); British^{P} (Herman 2006, p. 242)	Lord 1976, p. 314; Herman 2006, p. 242
Untitled: ("Thomas Fitzgerald, Shane O'Neill")	24	Thomas Fitzgerald, Shane O'Neill			Black Harps in the Hills	A shorter version of the 53-line "Black Harps in the Hills"; Letter:^{K} Harold Preece, c. March 1929, a version (Herman 2006, p. 154)	Lord 1976, p. 299; Herman 2006, p. 154; Thom, Herman & Woods, § B	
Untitled: ("Thorfinn, Thorfinn, where have you been?")	36	Thorfinn, Thorfinn, where have you been?	Weirdbook #13	1978	The Return of the Sea-Farer			Lord 1976, p. 309; Herman 2006, p. 196
Untitled: "A Thousand Years Ago"	21	I was a chief of the Chatagai	Night Images	1976	Untitled: ("I was a chief of the Chatagai")		Tentative title^{B} (Lord 1976, p. 311)	Lord 1976, p. 311; Herman 2006, p. 214
Untitled: ("A thousand years ago great Genghis reigned")	4	A thousand years ago great Genghis reigned	A Rhyme of Salem Town and Other Poems	2002	Krakorum		Tentative title^{B} (Lord 1976, p. 305); An early work^{C} (Lord 1976, p. 305); An introduction by Howard states that he was 17 when he wrote this poem (Herman 2006, p. 178)	Lord 1976, p. 305; Herman 2006, p. 178
Untitled ("A thousand years, perhaps, have come and gone")	32	A thousand years, perhaps, have come and gone	Up John Kane! and Other Poems	1977	When Death Drops Her Veil		Tentative title^{B} (Lord 1976, p. 313)	Lord 1976, p. 313
Untitled: ("Through the mists of silence there came a sound")	9	Through the mists of silence there came a sound	Yesteryear #4	Oct 1989			Letter:^{K} Tevis Clyde Smith, c. February 1929 (Herman 2006, p. 233)	Herman 2006, p. 233
Untitled: ("'Throw out that Red!' they cried ...")	4	"'Throw out that Red!' they cried ..."	The Collected Letters Of Robert E. Howard, Volume 1: 1923–1929	2007	Throw out that Red!		Letter:^{K} Tevis Clyde Smith, c. March 1929	
Untitled: ("Thus in my mood I love you")	30	Thus in my mood I love you	Omniumgathum	October 1976	To a Woman (3)^{N}; The Tide		Pen name: Patrick Howard^{O} (Lord 1976, p. 299)	Herman 2006, p. 214
Untitled: ("Thus in my mood I love you")	30	Thus in my mood I love you			To a Woman (3)^{N}; The Tide		Very similar to THE TIDE—-the last two lines of "Tide" have been truncated; some punctuational differences, one word changed, and third and fourth lines of each verse are combined in a single line	Lord 1976, p. 299; Herman 2006, p. 216
Untitled: ("The Tide")	30	Thus in my mood I love you			To a Woman (3)^{N}; The Tide Untitled: ("Thus in my mood I love you")		Very similar to THE TIDE—-the last two lines of "Tide" have been truncated; some punctuational differences, one word changed, and third and fourth lines of each verse are combined in a single line	Lord 1976, p. 299; Herman 2006, p. 216
Untitled: ("The times, the times ...")	14	The times, the times ...	The New Howard Reader #5	Mar 1999			Written on the endpapers of a copy of Beau Geste (Herman 2006, p. 233)	Herman 2006, p. 233
Untitled: ("Tingle, jingle, dingle, tingle")	23	Tingle, jingle, dingle, tingle, hear my brazen tones	A Rhyme of Salem Town and Other Poems	2002	Little Bell of Brass		Tentative title^{B} (Lord 1976, p. 305)	Lord 1976, p. 305; Herman 2006, p. 182
Untitled: To a Woman	30	Thus in my mood I love you			(3)^{N}; The Tide; Untitled: ("Thus in my mood I love you")		Very similar to THE TIDE—-the last two lines of "Tide" have been truncated; some punctuational differences, one word changed, and third and fourth lines of each verse are combined in a single line	Lord 1976, p. 299; Herman 2006, p. 216
Untitled: ("To Harry the Oliad Men")	12	When the first winds of summer the roses brought	Omniumgathum	1976	Untitled: ("When the first winds of summer")		Tentative title^{B} (Lord 1976, p. 312)	Lord 1976, p. 312; Herman 2006, p. 216
Untitled: ("Toast to the British!")	6	Toast to the British! Damn their souls to Hell.	The Last of the Trunk Och Brev I Urval	Mar 2007		Wikisource	Letter:^{K} Tevis Clyde Smith, c. August–September 1927 (Herman 2006, p. 233); PD^{L}	Herman 2006, p. 233
Untitled: ("Topaz seas and laughing skies")	4	Topaz seas and laughing skies	A Rhyme of Salem Town and Other Poems	2002	Sea-Chant		Tentative title^{B} (Lord 1976, p. 310)	Lord 1976, p. 310; Herman 2006, p. 202
Untitled: ("The towers stand recorders")	16(?)	The towers stand recorders	The Robert E. Howard Foundation Newsletter, vol. 1, #2	Nov 2007	The Builders (3)			Herman 2006, p. 156
Untitled: The Trail of Gold	8	Come with me to the Land of Sunrise	A Rhyme of Salem Town and Other Poems	2002	Untitled: ("Come with me to the Land of Sunrise")		Tentative title^{B} (Lord 1976, p. 312); An early work^{C} (Lord 1976, p. 312)	Lord 1976, p. 312; Herman 2006, p. 217
Untitled: "Trail's End"	4	Ho, for a trail that is bloody and long	A Rhyme of Salem Town and Other Poems	2002	Untitled: ("Ho, for a trail that is bloody and long")		Tentative title^{B} (Lord 1976, p. 312); Possibly incomplete (Lord 1976, p. 312); From:^{T} Untitled, begins "As he approached..." (Lord 1976, p. 312)	Lord 1976, p. 312; Herman 2006, p. 217
Untitled: ("Tread not where stony deserts hold")	4	Tread not where stony deserts hold	Dark Things	1971	The House in the Oaks; The Children of the Night		Third of the three verses from "The House In The Oaks" (with "An Open Window" and "Arkham"). Originally from an early draft of "The Children of the Night", attributed to fictitious poet Justin Geoffrey. Replaced in the final version with two lines from "The Gates of Damascus" by James Flecker, this poem was added by Derleth to his version of "The House in the Oaks"; titled with the first line in COLLECTED POETRY. Herman 2006, p. 157	Herman 2006, p. 157; Thom, Herman & Woods, § C
Untitled: ("The tribes of men rise up and pass")	4	The tribes of men rise up and pass	Weirdbook #13	1978	Only a Shadow on the Grass		Tentative title^{B} (Lord 1976, p. 308)	Lord 1976, p. 308; Herman 2006, p. 190
Untitled: ("'Turn out the light.'")	14	"Turn out the light." I raised a willing hand	Desire and Other Erotic Poems	1989	Desire		Tentative title^{B} (Lord 1976, p. 303)	Lord 1976, p. 303; Herman 2006, p. 162
Untitled: ("'Twas twice a hundred centuries ago")	9	'Twas twice a hundred centuries ago	A Rhyme of Salem Town and Other Poems	2002	Now and Then		Tentative title^{B} (Lord 1976, p. 308); Unfinished (Lord 1976, p. 308)	Lord 1976, p. 308; Herman 2006, pp. 188–189
Untitled: ("Under the grim San Saba hills")	60	Under the grim San Saba hills	A Rhyme of Salem Town and Other Poems	2002	The Lost Mine; The Lost San Saba Mine		Letter:^{K} H. P. Lovecraft, April 23, 1933 (Herman 2006, p. 182)	Lord 1976, p. 305; Herman 2006, p. 182
Untitled Untamed Avatars	24	They break from the pack and seek their own track	A Rhyme of Salem Town and Other Poems	2002	Untitled ("They break from the pack")		Tentative title^{B} (Lord 1976, p. 312)	Lord 1976, p. 312; Herman 2006, p. 217
Untitled: ("Up over the cromlech")	6	Up over the cromlech and down the rath	A Rhyme of Salem Town and Other Poems	2002	The Phantoms Gather		Tentative title^{B} (Lord 1976, p. 308)	Lord 1976, p. 308; Herman 2006, p. 192
Untitled: ("Up with the curtain, lo, the stage is set")	14	Up with the curtain, lo, the stage is set	The Howard Collector #17	Autumn 1972	On With the Play		Originally untitled (Lord 1976, p. 182)	Lord 1976, p. 182; Herman 2006, p. 190
Untitled: ("The warm veldt spread beneath the tropic sun")	84	The warm veldt spread beneath the tropic sun	A Rhyme of Salem Town and Other Poems	2002	The Chief of the Matabeles		Tentative title^{B} (Lord 1976, p. 302); Unfinished (Lord 1976, p. 302)/(Herman 2006, p. 157); An early work^{C} (Lord 1976, p. 302)	Lord 1976, p. 302; Herman 2006, p. 157; Thom, Herman & Woods, § C
Untitled: Warning, A(2)^{N} (partial version)	16	You have built a world of paper and wood	The Howard Collector #5	Summer 1964	Untitled: ("You have built a world of paper and wood")		Letter:^{K} August Derleth, May 9, 1936 (Herman 2006, p. 237); Share lines with version 1 (Herman 2006, p. 237)	Lord 1976, p. 191; Herman 2006, p. 237
Untitled: "Was I There?"	10	I, was I there	A Rhyme of Salem Town and Other Poems	2002	Untitled: ("I, was I there")		Tentative title^{B} (Lord 1976, p. 313)	Lord 1976, p. 313; Herman 2006, p. 237
Untitled: ("We are the duckers of crosses")	20	We are the duckers of crosses	The Last of the Trunk Och Brev I Urval	Mar 2007		Wikisource	parody of "We Are the Music Makers"; Letter:^{K} Tevis Clyde Smith, April 14, 1926(Herman 2006, p. 234); PD^{L}	Herman 2006, p. 234
Untitled: ("We are they")	28		Magazine of Horror #34	Fall 1970	A Song of Defeat		Originally untitled (Lord 1976, p. 187)	Lord 1976, p. 187; Herman 2006, p. 208
Untitled: ("We reap and bind the bitter yield")	4	We reap and bind the bitter yield	The Howard Collector	Autumn 1972	Harvest		Originally untitled (Lord 1976, p. 176)	Lord 1976, p. 176; Herman 2006, p. 173
Untitled: ("We, the winds that walk the world")	64	We, the winds that walk the world	A Rhyme of Salem Town and Other Poems	2002	The Winds That Walk the World		Tentative title^{B} (Lord 1976, p. 314)	Lord 1976, p. 314; Herman 2006, p. 240
Untitled: ("We're a jolly good bunch of bums")	4	We're a jolly good bunch of bums	A Rhyme of Salem Town and Other Poems	2002	Code		Tentative title^{B} (Lord 1976, p. 302); An early work^{C} (Lord 1976, p. 302)	Lord 1976, p. 302; Herman 2006, p. 158; Thom, Herman & Woods, § C
Untitled: ("What's become of Waring")	8	What's become of Waring	The Last of the Trunk Och Brev I Urval	Mar 2007		Wikisource	Letter:^{K} Tevis Clyde Smith, c. Fall 1927 (Herman 2006, p. 234); PD^{L}; Parody of "Waring" by Robert Browning	Herman 2006, p. 234
Untitled: "When Death Drops Her Veil"	32	A thousand years, perhaps, have come and gone	Up John Kane! and Other Poems	1977	Untitled: ("A thousand years, perhaps, have come and gone")		Tentative title^{B} (Lord 1976, p. 313)	Lord 1976, p. 313; Herman 2006, p. 238
Untitled: ("When I was a youth")	12	When I was a youth, a deep craving for truth	A Rhyme of Salem Town and Other Poems	2002	When I Was a Youth		Tentative title^{B} (Lord 1976, p. 313)	Lord 1976, p. 313; Herman 2006, p. 238
Untitled: When Men Were Bold	19	Now hark to this tale of long ago	A Rhyme of Salem Town and Other Poems	2002	Untitled: ("Now hark to this tale of long ago")		Tentative title^{B} (Lord 1976, p. 313); An early work^{C} (Lord 1976, p. 313); Unfinished (Lord 1976, p. 313)	Lord 1976, p. 313; Herman 2006, p. 238
Untitled: ("When Napoleon down in Africa")	13	When Napoleon down in Africa	Austin, vol. 3, no. 1	May 1992			Letter:^{K} Tevis Clyde Smith, June 8, 1923 (Herman 2006, p. 235); Distributed as part of REHUPA #115 (Herman 2006, p. 235)	Herman 2006, p. 235
Untitled: ("When the first winds of summer")	12	When the first winds of summer the roses brought	Omniumgathum	1976	To Harry the Oliad Men		Tentative title^{B} (Lord 1976, p. 312)	Lord 1976, p. 312; Herman 2006, p. 216
Untitled: "When the Glaciers Rumbled South"	12	I cut my teeth on toil and pain	The Ghost Ocean and Other Poems of the Supernatural	1982	Untitled: ("I cut my teeth on toil and pain")		Tentative title^{B} (Lord 1976, p. 313)	Lord 1976, p. 313; Herman 2006, p. 238
Untitled: "When the Gods Were Kings"	16	Where the jungle lies dank, exuding	Spoor Anthology #1	1974	Untitled: ("Where the jungle lies dank, exuding")		Tentative title^{B} (Lord 1976, p. 314)	Lord 1976, p. 314; Herman 2006, p. 238
Untitled: ("When wolf meets wolf")	4		The Golden Caliph^{I} The Last Celt	1922/1923; 1976	When Wolf Meets Wolf		An early work^{C} (Lord 1976, p. 190); Conflict:^{M} Lord (1976, p. 190), The Last Celt, 1976/Herman (2006, p. 239), The Golden Caliph, 1922/3	Lord 1976, p. 190; Herman 2006, p. 239
Untitled: ("When you were a set-up and I was a ham")	44	When you were a set-up and I was a ham	REH FIGHT MAGAZINE #2 (Chpbk.)				Letter: ^{K} Tevis Clyde Smith, May 24, 1925; probably inspired by Langdon Smith's "Evolution" (a.k.a. "When you were a tadpole and I was a fish"), cited in the November 4, 1923, letter to Tevis Clyde Smith)	
Untitled: "Where Are Your Knights, Donn Othna?"	32	Now that the kings have fallen	The Howard Collector #11	Spring 1969	Untitled: ("Now that the kings have fallen")		Originally untitled (Lord 1976, p. 191)	Lord 1976, p. 191; Herman 2006, p. 239
Untitled: ("Where the jungle lies dank, exuding")	16	Where the jungle lies dank, exuding	Spoor Anthology #1	1974	When the Gods Were Kings		Tentative title^{B} (Lord 1976, p. 314)	Lord 1976, p. 314; Herman 2006, p. 238
Untitled: Who is Grandpa Theobold?	19	Cities brooding beneath the seas	The Howard Collector #6	Spring 1965	Lines To Lovecraft; Untitled: ("Cities brooding beneath the seas")		Originally untitled (Lord 1976, p. 191); Letter:^{K} Tevis Clyde Smith, c. November 1931 (Herman 2006, p. 240)	Lord 1976, p. 191; Herman 2006, p. 240
Untitled: "Who Is Grandpa Theobald?" (verse heading)	4	Let it rest with the ages mysteries	The Collected Letters of Robert E. Howard, Volume 2: 1930-1932	Oct 2007	Lines To Lovecraft; Untitled: ("Let it rest with the ages mysteries")		Letter:^{K} Tevis Clyde Smith, c. November 1931 (Herman 2006, p. 225);Not actually written by Howard, but a quote from WHERE CANNIKANS CLINKED by Charles Nichols Webb, which, to confuse matters, Robert Louis Stevenson also cited in a poem	Herman 2006, p. 225
Untitled: "Who Shall Sing of Babylon?"	43	High the towers and mighty the walls, oh, proud-crested sons of Babylon	A Rhyme of Salem Town and Other Poems	2002	Untitled: ("High the towers and mighty the walls")		Tentative title^{B} (Lord 1976, p. 314)	Lord 1976, p. 314; Herman 2006, p. 240
Untitled: ("Wide and free ranging")	7	Wide and free ranging	A Rhyme of Salem Town and Other Poems	2002	The Desert		Tentative title^{B} (Lord 1976, p. 302); An early work^{C} (Lord 1976, p. 302)	Lord 1976, p. 302; Herman 2006, p. 161
Untitled: ("The wild bees hum")	8	The wild bees hum in the tangled vines	A Rhyme of Salem Town and Other Poems	2002	Land of the Pioneer		Tentative title^{B} (Lord 1976, p. 305); An early work^{C} (Lord 1976, p. 305)	Lord 1976, p. 305; Herman 2006, p. 179
Untitled: "Winds of the Sea, The" (1)	14	Over the hills the winds of the seas	A Rhyme of Salem Town and Other Poems	2002	^{N} Untitled: ("Over the hills the winds of the seas") (1)		Tentative title^{B} (Lord 1976, p. 314)	Lord 1976, p. 314; Herman 2006, p. 240
Untitled: "Winds of the Sea, The" (2)^{N}	16	Over the hills the winds of the seas	The Last of the Trunk Och Brev I Urval	Mar 2007	Untitled: ("Over the hills the winds of the seas") (2)^{N}			Herman 2006, p. 240
Untitled: ("The Winds That Walk the World")	64	We, the winds that walk the world	A Rhyme of Salem Town and Other Poems	2002	Untitled: ("We, the winds that walk the world")		Tentative title^{B} (Lord 1976, p. 314)	Lord 1976, p. 314; Herman 2006, p. 240
Untitled: ("The wine in my cup is bitter dregs")	44	The wine in my cup is bitter dregs	Shadows of Dreams	1989	A Song from an Ebony Heart		Letter:^{K} Tevis Clyde Smith; c. November 1928)	Herman 2006, p. 207
Untitled: ("A wizard who dwelt by Drumnakill")	4	A wizard who dwelt by Drumnakill	A Rhyme of Salem Town and Other Poems	2002	Mystic Lore		Tentative title^{B} (Lord 1976, p. 306)	Lord 1976, p. 306; Herman 2006, p. 187
Untitled: ("Wolf on the height")	14	Wolf on the height	Always Comes Evening	1957	Song of the Pict	"Song of the Pict"	From:^{T} Men of the Shadows (Lord 1976, p. 188); Originally untitled (Lord 1976, p. 188)	Lord 1976, p. 188; Herman 2006, p. 209
Untitled: ("The women come and the women go")	24	The women come and the women go	Slayer, The; A Rhyme of Salem Town and Other Poems	2002	The Slayer	Wikisource	Letter:^{K} Tevis Clyde Smith, c. December 1928 (Herman 2006, p. 205); PD^{L}	Herman 2006, p. 205
Untitled: ("The world goes back to the primitive, yea")	4	The world goes back to the primitive, yea	The Collected Letters of Robert E. Howard, Volume 1: 1923-1929	Jun 2007		Wikisource	Letter:^{K} Tevis Clyde Smith, c. January 1928 (Herman 2006, p. 235)	Herman 2006, p. 235
Untitled: ("The world has changed")	72	The world has changed	A Rhyme of Salem Town and Other Poems	2002	Mankind		Tentative title^{B} (Lord 1976, p. 306); An early work^{C} (Lord 1976, p. 306)	Lord 1976, p. 306; Herman 2006, p. 183
Untitled: ("The world is rife, say I")	8	The world is rife, say I	A Rhyme of Salem Town and Other Poems	2002	Freedom		Tentative title^{B} (Lord 1976, p. 304)	Lord 1976, p. 304; Herman 2006, p. 169
Untitled: ("The years are as a knife")	42	The years are as a knife against my heart	Magazine of Horror #19	Jan 1968	The Years Are as a Knife			Lord 1976, p. 192; Herman 2006, p. 241
Untitled: ("You have built a world of paper and wood")	16	You have built a world of paper and wood	The Howard Collector #5	Summer 1964	Warning, A (2)^{N}		Letter:^{K} August Derleth, May 9, 1936 (Herman 2006, p. 237); Share lines with version 1 (Herman 2006, p. 237)	Lord 1976, p. 191; Herman 2006, p. 237
Untitled: ("You lolled in gardens where breezes fanned ...")	92	You lolled in gardens where breezes fanned	A Song of the Naked Lands (chapbook)	1973	A Song of the Naked Lands		Originally untitled (Lord 1976, p. 188)	Lord 1976, p. 188; Herman 2006, p. 209
Untitled: ("The Zulu Lord")	28	This is the tale the Kaffirs tell as the tints of twilight melt	Fantasy Tales	Winter 1983		Untitled: ("This is the tale the Kaffirs tell")	Tentative title^{B} (Lord 1976, p. 314); British^{P} (Herman 2006, p. 242)	Lord 1976, p. 314; Herman 2006, p. 242
Untitled: ("Zululand")	28	That is no land for weaklings, no land for coward or fool	A Rhyme of Salem Town and Other Poems	2002	Untitled: (" That is no land for weaklings")		Tentative title^{B} (Lord 1976, p. 314); An early work^{C} (Lord 1976, p. 314)	Lord 1976, p. 314; Herman 2006, p. 242
"Up, John Kane!"	23	Up, John Kane, the grey night's falling	Up John Kane! and Other Poems	1977				Lord 1976, p. 313; Herman 2006, p. 236; Howard 2008, p. x
Up over the cromlech ...	6	Up over the cromlech and down the rath	A Rhyme of Salem Town and Other Poems	2002	Untitled ("Up over the cromlech ..."); Phantoms Gather, The		Tentative title^{B} (Lord 1976, p. 308)	Lord 1976, p. 308; Herman 2006, p. 192
"Up with the curtain, lo, ..."	14	Up with the curtain, lo, the stage is set	The Howard Collector #17	Autumn 1972	On With the Play; Untitled ("Up with the curtain, lo, ...")		Originally untitled (Lord 1976, p. 182)	Lord 1976, p. 182; Herman 2006, p. 190
Vampire			n/a	n/a			Lost^{U}	Thom, Herman & Woods, § C
Victory	48	Red fires in the North are glowing bright	Night Images	1976				Lord 1976, p. 313; Herman 2006, p. 236
Viking of the Sky, The	80	The skies are red before me	Austin, vol. 3, no. 3	Nov 1992			Letter:^{K} Tevis Clyde Smith, undated (Herman 2006, p. 236); Distributed as part of REHUPA #118 (Herman 2006, p. 236)	Herman 2006, p. 236
Viking's Trail	22	From the sullen cliffs and the grim fiords	Verses in Ebony	1975				Lord 1976, p. 313; Herman 2006, p. 236
Viking's Vision	44	A white sea was flowing, a bitter wind was blowing	The Ghost Ocean and Other Poems of the Supernatural	1982	Viking's Vision, A			Lord 1976, p. 313; Herman 2006, p. 236
Vision, A	32	Long glaives of frozen light crawled up and down	Startling Mystery Stories	Fall 1967	Black Mass			Lord 1976, p. 190; Herman 2006, p. 236
Visions	8	I cannot believe in a paradise	The Howard Collector #16	Spring 1972		Wikisource		Lord 1976, p. 190; Herman 2006, p. 236
Voices of the Night [poem cycle]	134	1. The blind black shadows reach inhuman arms / 2. Now in the gloom the pulsing drums repeat / 3. Ten million years beyond the sweep of Time / 4. The great black tower rose to split the stars / 5. A roar of battle thundered in the hills	The Last of the Trunk Och Brev I Urval	Mar 2007	Echoing Shadows; Iron Harp, The		A group of five poems: "The Voices Waken Memory" (24 lines); "Babel" (19 lines); "Laughter in the Gulfs" (18 lines); "Moon Shame" (34 lines); and "A Crown for a King" (39 lines); Letter:^{K} Tevis Clyde Smith, undated, beginning "The Seeker thrust ..."; Does NOT include the individual poem "The Iron Harp," which is, confusingly, the fourth poem in the BLACK DAWN cycle!	Lord 1976, p. 174; Herman 2006, p. 166
Voices Waken Memory, The	24	The blind black shadows reach inhuman arms	The Fantasy Fan	Sep 1934	A Drum Begins to Throb; Out of the Deep	Wikisource	PD^{L}; Part 1 of the Voices of the Night cycle	Lord 1976, p. 190; Herman 2006, p. 237
Wanderer, The	12	I wandered through a forest land	A Rhyme of Salem Town and Other Poems	2002			Incomplete, only the first eleven lines survive (Lord 1976, p. 313)	Lord 1976, p. 313; Herman 2006, p. 237
The Wanderlust			n/a	n/a			Lost^{U}	Thom, Herman & Woods, § C
War to the Blind	16	War is thunder of unseen feet	Fantasy Crossroads #4/5	Aug 1975				Lord 1976, p. 313; Herman 2006, p. 237
"The warm veldt spread ..."	84	The warm veldt spread beneath the tropic sun	A Rhyme of Salem Town and Other Poems	2002	Chief of the Matabeles, The; Untitled ("The warm veldt spread ...")		Tentative title^{B} (Lord 1976, p. 302); Unfinished (Lord 1976, p. 302)/(Herman 2006, p. 157); An early work^{C} (Lord 1976, p. 302)	Lord 1976, p. 302; Herman 2006, p. 157; Thom, Herman & Woods, § C
Warning, A (1)^{N}	24	I come in the wail of the broken skies	Echoes from an Iron Harp	1972			Share lines with version 2 (Herman 2006, p. 237)	Lord 1976, p. 191; Herman 2006, p. 237
Warning, A (2)^{N}	16	You have built a world of paper and wood	The Howard Collector #5	Summer 1964	Untitled ("You have builded a world of paper and wood")		Letter:^{K} August Derleth, May 9, 1936 (Herman 2006, p. 237); Share lines with version 1 (Herman 2006, p. 237)	Lord 1976, p. 191; Herman 2006, p. 237
Warning to Orthodoxy, A	36	Frozen crust that a hoof cuts through	Shadows of Dreams	1989			Letter:^{K} Tevis Clyde Smith, c. July 1928 (Herman 2006, p. 237)	Herman 2006, p. 237
Was I There?	10	I, was I there	A Rhyme of Salem Town and Other Poems	2002	Untitled ("I, was I there")		Tentative title^{B} (Lord 1976, p. 313)	Lord 1976, p. 313; Herman 2006, p. 237
We are the duckers of crosses	20	We are the duckers of crosses	The Last of the Trunk Och Brev I Urval	Mar 2007	Untitled: We are the duckers of crosses	Wikisource	parody of "We Are the Music Makers"	Letter:^{K} Tevis Clyde Smith, April 14, 1926(Herman 2006, p. 234); PD^{L} Herman 2006, p. 234
"We are they"	28	We are they	Magazine of Horror #34	Fall 1970	Song of Defeat, A; Untitled ("We are they")		Originally untitled (Lord 1976, p. 187)	Lord 1976, p. 187; Herman 2006, p. 208
"We reap and bind the bitter yield"	4	We reap and bind the bitter yield	The Howard Collector	Autumn 1972	Harvest; Untitled ("We reap and bind the bitter yield")		Originally untitled (Lord 1976, p. 176)	Lord 1976, p. 176; Herman 2006, p. 173
Weakling, The	14	I died in sin and forthwith went to Hell	A Robert E. Howard Memorial: June 13–15, 1986	1986		Wikisource		Lord 1976, p. 313; Herman 2006, p. 238
Weird Ballad, A	25	The werewolf came across the hill	Shadows of Dreams	1989			Letter:^{K} Tevis Clyde Smith, c. April 1932 (Herman 2006, p. 238)	Herman 2006, p. 238
"We're a jolly good bunch of bums"	4	We're a jolly good bunch of bums	A Rhyme of Salem Town and Other Poems	2002	Code; Untitled ("We're a jolly good bunch of bums")		Tentative title^{B} (Lord 1976, p. 302); An early work^{C} (Lord 1976, p. 302)	Lord 1976, p. 302; Herman 2006, p. 158; Thom, Herman & Woods, § C
West	4	West to the halls of Belshazzar	A Rhyme of Salem Town and Other Poems	2002				Lord 1976, p. 313; Herman 2006, p. 238
What is Love?			The Right Hook^{I} vol. 1, #2	1925				Herman 2006, p. 238
What's become of Waring?	8	What's become of Waring	The Last of the Trunk Och Brev I Urval	Mar 2007	Untitled: What's become of Waring	Wikisource	Letter:^{K} Tevis Clyde Smith, c. Fall 1927 (Herman 2006, p. 234); PD^{L}; Parody of "Waring" by Robert Browning	Herman 2006, p. 234
Wheel of Destiny, The	12	The day of man's set doom is come	A Rhyme of Salem Town and Other Poems	2002	Doom			Lord 1976, p. 313; Herman 2006, p. 238
When Arthur Rides Again			n/a	n/a			Lost^{U}	Thom, Herman & Woods, § C
When Death Drops Her Veil	32	A thousand years, perhaps, have come and gone	Up John Kane! and Other Poems	1977	Untitled ("A thousand years, perhaps, have come and gone")		Tentative title^{B} (Lord 1976, p. 313)	Lord 1976, p. 313; Herman 2006, p. 238
When I Was a Youth	12	When I was a youth, a deep craving for truth	A Rhyme of Salem Town and Other Poems	2002	Untitled ("When I was a youth")		Tentative title^{B} (Lord 1976, p. 313)	Lord 1976, p. 313; Herman 2006, p. 238
When I Was in Africa	21	When I was down in Africa, in Africa, in Africa	A Rhyme of Salem Town and Other Poems	2002			An early work^{C} (Lord 1976, p. 313)	Lord 1976, p. 313; Herman 2006, p. 238
When Men Were Bold	19	Now hark to this tale of long ago	A Rhyme of Salem Town and Other Poems	2002	Untitled ("Now hark to this tale of long ago")		Tentative title^{B} (Lord 1976, p. 313); An early work^{C} (Lord 1976, p. 313); Unfinished (Lord 1976, p. 313)	Lord 1976, p. 313; Herman 2006, p. 238
When Napoleon down in Africa	13	When Napoleon down in Africa	Austin, vol. 3, no. 1	May 1992	Untitled: When Napoleon down in Africa		Letter:^{K} Tevis Clyde Smith, June 8, 1923 (Herman 2006, p. 235); Distributed as part of REHUPA #115 (Herman 2006, p. 235)	Herman 2006, p. 235
"When the first winds of summer ..."	12	When the first winds of summer the roses brought	Omniumgathum	1976	To Harry the Oliad Men; Untitled ("When the first winds of summer ...")		Tentative title^{B} (Lord 1976, p. 312)	Lord 1976, p. 312; Herman 2006, p. 216
When the Glaciers Rumbled South	12	I cut my teeth on toil and pain	The Ghost Ocean and Other Poems of the Supernatural	1982	Untitled ("I cut my teeth on toil and pain")		Tentative title^{B} (Lord 1976, p. 313)	Lord 1976, p. 313; Herman 2006, p. 238
When the Gods Were Kings	16	Where the jungle lies dank, exuding	Spoor Anthology #1	1974	Untitled ("Where the jungles lay dank, exuding")		Tentative title^{B} (Lord 1976, p. 314)	Lord 1976, p. 314; Herman 2006, p. 238
When Wolf Meets Wolf	4	When wolf meets wolf	The Golden Caliph^{I} The Last Celt	1922/1923; 1976	Untitled ("When wolf meets wolf")		An early work^{C} (Lord 1976, p. 190); Conflict:^{M} Lord (1976, p. 190), The Last Celt, 1976/Herman (2006, p. 239), The Golden Caliph, 1922/3	Lord 1976, p. 190; Herman 2006, p. 239
"When you were a set-up and I was a ham"	44	When you were a set-up and I was a ham	REH FIGHT MAGAZINE #2 (Chpbk.)	September 1990	Untitled: ("When you were a set-up and I was a ham")		Letter: ^{K} Tevis Clyde Smith, May 24, 1925; probably inspired by Langdon Smith's "Evolution" (a.k.a. "When you were a tadpole and I was a fish"), cited in the November 4, 1923, letter to Tevis Clyde Smith)	
Whence Cometh Erlik?			Robert E. Howard Foundation Newsletter Volume 6 Number 3	2012			An untitled poem from the Glenn Lord collection	
Where Are Your Knights, Donn Othna?	32	Now that the kings have fallen	The Howard Collector #11	Spring 1969	Untitled ("Now that the kings have fallen")		Originally untitled (Lord 1976, p. 191)	Lord 1976, p. 191; Herman 2006, p. 239
"Where the jungles lay dank, exuding"	16	Where the jungle lies dank, exuding	Spoor Anthology #1	1974	When the Gods Were Kings; Untitled ("Where the jungles lay dank, exuding")		Tentative title^{B} (Lord 1976, p. 314)	Lord 1976, p. 314; Herman 2006, p. 238
Which Will Scarcely Be Understood	45	Small poets sing of little, foolish things	Weird Tales	Oct 1937		"Which Will Scarcely Be Understood"		Lord 1976, p. 191; Herman 2006, p. 239; Howard 2008, p. x
Whispers	16	I was born in a lonesome land	Shadows of Dreams	1989			Letter:^{K} Tevis Clyde Smith, c. March 1930 (Herman 2006, p. 239)	Herman 2006, p. 239
Whispers on the Nightwinds	12	"I would ride on the winds, I would soar like a gull	Shadows of Dreams	1989			Letter:^{K} Tevis Clyde Smith, c. April 1930 (Herman 2006, p. 239)	Herman 2006, p. 239
White Thunder	24	I was a child in Cornwall where the mountains meet the shore	Singers in the Shadows	1970				Lord 1976, p. 191; Herman 2006, p. 240
Who is Grandpa Theobold?	19	Cities brooding beneath the seas	The Howard Collector #6	Spring 1965	Untitled ("Cities brooding beneath the seas")		Originally untitled (Lord 1976, p. 191); Letter:^{K} Tevis Clyde Smith, c. November 1931 (Herman 2006, p. 240)	Lord 1976, p. 191; Herman 2006, p. 240
Untitled: "Who Shall Sing of Babylon?"	43	High the towers and mighty the walls, oh, proud-crested sons of Babylon	A Rhyme of Salem Town and Other Poems	2002	Untitled: ("High the towers and mighty the walls")		Tentative title^{B} (Lord 1976, p. 314)	Lord 1976, p. 314; Herman 2006, p. 240
Whoopansat of Humorous Kookooyam, The	96	Rise, seize your clothes, prepare yourself for flight	Risque Stories #2	Oct 1984			A parody of Omar Khayyam (Lord 1976, p. 314)	Lord 1976, p. 314; Herman 2006, p. 240
"Wide and free swings the desert ..."	7	Wide and free swings the desert, far as reaches the eye	A Rhyme of Salem Town and Other Poems	2002	Desert, The; Untitled ("Wide and free ranging ...")		Tentative title^{B} (Lord 1976, p. 302); An early work^{C} (Lord 1976, p. 302)	Lord 1976, p. 302; Herman 2006, p. 161
"The wild bees hum ..."	8	The wild bees hum in the tangled vines	A Rhyme of Salem Town and Other Poems	2002	Land of the Pioneer; Untitled ("The wild bees hum ...")		Tentative title^{B} (Lord 1976, p. 305); An early work^{C} (Lord 1976, p. 305)	Lord 1976, p. 305; Herman 2006, p. 179
Winds of the Sea, The (1)^{N}	14	Over the hills the winds of the seas	A Rhyme of Salem Town and Other Poems	2002	Untitled ("Over the hills the winds ...")		Tentative title^{B} (Lord 1976, p. 314)	Lord 1976, p. 314; Herman 2006, p. 240
Winds of the Sea, The (2)^{N}	16	Over the hills the winds of the seas	The Last of the Trunk Och Brev I Urval	Mar 2007				Herman 2006, p. 240
Winds That Walk the World, The	64	We, the winds that walk the world	A Rhyme of Salem Town and Other Poems	2002	Untitled ("We, the winds that walk the world")		Tentative title^{B} (Lord 1976, p. 314)	Lord 1976, p. 314; Herman 2006, p. 240
"The wine in my cup is bitter dregs ..."	44	The wine in my cup is bitter dregs	Shadows of Dreams	1989	Song from an Ebony Heart, A Untitled ("The wine in my cup is bitter dregs ...")		Letter:^{K} Tevis Clyde Smith; c. November 1928)	Herman 2006, p. 207
Witch, The	28	We set a stake amid the stones	Singers in the Shadows	1970				Lord 1976, p. 191; Herman 2006, p. 240
"A wizard who dwelt in Drumnakill"	4	A wizard who dwelt by Drumnakill	A Rhyme of Salem Town and Other Poems	2002	Mystic Lore; Untitled ("A wizard who dwelt in Drumnakill")		Tentative title^{B} (Lord 1976, p. 306)	Lord 1976, p. 306; Herman 2006, p. 187
"Wolf on the height"	14	Wolf on the height	Always Comes Evening	1957	Untitled: "Song of the Pict"; Untitled: ("Wolf on the height")	"Song of the Pict"	From:^{T} Men of the Shadows (Lord 1976, p. 188); Originally untitled (Lord 1976, p. 188)	Lord 1976, p. 188; Herman 2006, p. 209
The women come and the women go	24	The women come and the women go	A Rhyme of Salem Town and Other Poems	2002	Slayer, The; Untitled: The women come and the women go	Wikisource	Letter:^{K} Tevis Clyde Smith, c. December 1928 (Herman 2006, p. 205); PD^{L}	Herman 2006, p. 205
Word from the Outer Dark, A	24	My ruthless hands still clutch at life	Kadath #1	1974	Song from the Outer Dark, A		Pen name: Patrick Howard^{O} (Lord 1976, p. 299)	Lord 1976, p. 299; Herman 2006, p. 240
The world goes back to the primitive, yea	4	The world goes back to the primitive, yea	The Collected Letters of Robert E. Howard, Volume 1: 1923-1929	Jun 2007	Untitled: The world goes back to the primitive, yea	Wikisource	Letter:^{K} Tevis Clyde Smith, c. January 1928 (Herman 2006, p. 235)	Herman 2006, p. 235
"The world has changed"	72	The world has changed	A Rhyme of Salem Town and Other Poems	2002	Mankind; Untitled ("The world has changed")		Tentative title^{B} (Lord 1976, p. 306); An early work^{C} (Lord 1976, p. 306)	Lord 1976, p. 306; Herman 2006, p. 183
"The world is rife, say I"	8	The world is rife, say I	A Rhyme of Salem Town and Other Poems	2002	Freedom; Untitled ("The world is rife, say I")		Tentative title^{B} (Lord 1976, p. 304)	Lord 1976, p. 304; Herman 2006, p. 169
Worshippers, The	24	Man who looks from the shadows with eyes like the seas of night	A Rhyme of Salem Town and Other Poems	2002				Lord 1976, p. 314; Herman 2006, p. 240
Years Are as a Knife, The	42	The years are as a knife against my heart	Magazine of Horror #19	Jan 1968	Untitled ("The years are as a knife ...")			Lord 1976, p. 192; Herman 2006, p. 241
Yesterdays	30	At the dawning of Time when the world was young	A Rhyme of Salem Town and Other Poems	2002				Herman 2006, p. 241
Yodels of Good Sneer to the Pipple, Damn Them	24	We are the buttock shakers	The Collected Letters of Robert E. Howard, Volume 1: 1923-1929	Jun 2007		Wikisource	Letter:^{K} Tevis Clyde Smith, c. November 1928 (Herman 2006, p. 241); PD^{L}; Parody of "We Are the Music-Makers" by Arthur William Edgar O'Shaughnessy	Herman 2006, p. 241
"You have built a world of paper and wood"	16	You have built a world of paper and wood	The Howard Collector #5	Summer 1964	Warning, A (2)^{N}; Untitled ("You have built a world of paper and wood")		Letter:^{K} August Derleth, May 9, 1936 (Herman 2006, p. 237); Share lines with version 1 (Herman 2006, p. 237)	Lord 1976, p. 191; Herman 2006, p. 237
"You lolled in gardens where breezes fanned"	92	You lolled in gardens where breezes fanned	A Song of the Naked Lands	1973	Song of the Naked Lands, A; Untitled ("You lolled in gardens where breezes fanned")		Originally untitled (Lord 1976, p. 188)	Lord 1976, p. 188; Herman 2006, p. 209
Young Corbett			n/a	n/a			Lost^{U}	Thom, Herman & Woods, § C
Young Johnny	48	Young Johnny's been on sea	The Collected Letters of Robert E. Howard, Volume 1: 1923-1929	Jun 2007		https://maxhunter.missouristate.edu/songinformation.aspx?ID=1404	Mnemonic reconstruction^{V} of an old folk song; Letter:^{K} Robert W. Gordon, February 4, 1925; third and fourth lines of the second stanza were omitted, and later included in REH's February 15, 1926 letter to Gordon; NOT INCLUDED IN COLLECTED POETRY	
Young Lockanbars	36	Oh, young Lockanbars has come out	The Golden Caliph^{I} The Last Celt	1922-1923; 1976			An early work^{C} (Lord 1976, p. 192); Conflict:^{M} Lord (1976, p. 190), The Last Celt, 1976/Herman (2006, p. 239), The Golden Caliph, 1922/3	Lord 1976, p. 192; Herman 2006, p. 241
Young Wife's Tale, A	24	My husband's brother's wife is a woman I fear and hate	Risque Stories #5	Mar 1987			Letter:^{K} Tevis Clyde Smith, c. June 1928 (Herman 2006, p. 241)	Herman 2006, p. 241
Youth Spoke — Not in Anger 2)^{N}	24	They bruised my soul with a proverb	The Howard Collector #18	Autumn 1973	Life (2)	Wikisource	Letter:^{K} R. H. Barlow, June 14, 1934 (Herman 2006, p. 181)	Lord 1976, p. 179; Herman 2006, p. 181
Zukala's Hour	48	High in his dim, ghost haunted tower	Singers in the Shadows	1970				Lord 1976, p. 192; Herman 2006, p. 241
Zukala's Jest	26	The gods brought a Soul before Zukala	Whispers #5	Nov 1974				Lord 1976, p. 314; Herman 2006, p. 241
Zukala's Love Song	80	Along the sky my chariot ran	Weird Tales #302	Fall 1991	Zukala's Mating Song		Some lines published in The Dark Barbarian (1984) (Herman 2006, p. 241)	Lord 1976, p. 314; Herman 2006, p. 241
Zukala's Mating Song					Zukala's Love Song			Lord 1976, p. 314; Herman 2006, p. 241
Zulu Lord, The	28	This is the tale the Kaffirs tell as the tints of twilight melt	Fantasy Tales	Winter 1983	Untitled ("This is the tale the Kaffirs tell ...")		Tentative title^{B} (Lord 1976, p. 314); British^{P} (Herman 2006, p. 242)	Lord 1976, p. 314; Herman 2006, p. 242
Zululand	28	That is no land for weaklings, no land for coward or fool	A Rhyme of Salem Town and Other Poems	2002	Untitled ("That is no land for weaklings ...")		Tentative title^{B} (Lord 1976, p. 314); An early work^{C} (Lord 1976, p. 314)	Lord 1976, p. 314; Herman 2006, p. 242

== Poem cycles ==
In addition to stand-alone poems, Howard also wrote cycles of poetry.

Title	Lines	Opening line	Place of publication	Publication date	Alternative title(s)	Source text	Notes	References
Black Dawn	105	A black moon nailed against a sullen dawn / The gods have said: "Life is a mystic shrine." / Mohammed, Buddha, Moses, Satan, Thor! / They sell brown men for gold in Zanzibar / Break down the world and mold it once again!	Black Dawn	1972			Letter:^{K} Tevis Clyde Smith, c. March 1929 (Herman 2006, p. 154); Each poem was untitled in the original letter, but the titles were listed in a later manuscript found in 1985 (Herman 2006, p. 154).	Lord 1976, p. 171; Herman 2006, p. 154; Thom, Herman & Woods, § B
1. Shadows; 2. Clouds; 3. Shrines; 4. The Iron Harp (2)^{N}; 5. Invocation
Echoing Shadows					The Iron Harp (1)^{N}, Voices of the Night			Lord 1976, p. 174; Herman 2006, p. 166
Etchings In Ivory (1)^{N}	148 words + 1,001 words + 1,795 words + 331 words + 904 words + 579 words, for a total of 4,758 words	Let no man read here who lives only in the world about him. / This is a dream that comes to me often. / Surely it was in decadent Athens—in marble-throned Athens of Sophocles in the Periclean Age. / There is a gate whose portals are of opal and ivory, and to this gate I went one silent twilight ... / The tang of winter is in the air and in the brain of me. / I knelt in a great cavern before an altar which sent up in everlasting spirals a slender serpent of white smoke. /	Etchings In Ivory (Chapbook)	1968			A brief collection of "prose-poems."	
untitled introduction (148 words); 1. Flaming Marble(not to be confused with the verse poem of the same name) (1,001 words); 2. Skulls and Orchids (1,795 words); 3. Medallions in the Moon (331 words); 4. The Gods that Men Forget (904 words); 5. Bloodstones and Ebony (579 words)
Iron Harp, The (1)^{N}	24 + 19 + 18 + 34 + 39 lines, for a total of 134	1. The blind black shadows reach inhuman arms / 2. Now in the gloom the pulsing drums repeat / 3. Ten million years beyond the sweep of Time / 4. The great black tower rose to split the stars / 5. A roar of battle thundered in the hills	The Last of the Trunk Och Brev I Urval	Mar 2007	Voices of the Night; Echoing Shadows		Letter:^{K} Tevis Clyde Smith, undated (Herman 2006, p. 175); ..."; Does NOT include the individual poem "The Iron Harp," which is, confusingly, the fourth poem in the BLACK DAWN cycle!	Herman 2006, p. 175
1. Out of the Deep (a.k.a. The Voices Waken Memory); 2. Babel; 3. Laughter in the Gulf; 4. Moon Shame; 5. A Crown for a King
The Mysteries	4 + 2 + 8 lines for a total of 14	Baal, lord Baal, of the ebon throne / God of the gods, high, most high! See these rods! Hear our cry! / Her face was white, the naked girl they sat	Yesteryear #4	October 1989			Letter:^{K} Tevis Clyde Smith, ca. February 1929	Herman 2006, p. 211
1."The Invocation"; 2. The Chorus of the Chant; 3. The Sacrifice
Sonnets Out of Bedlam	Five 14-line sonnets for a total of 70 lines	At birth a witch laid on me monstrous spells / I dreamed a stony idol striding came / I swam below the surface of a lake / The walls of Luxor broke the silver sand / Hinged in the brooding west a black sun hung						Herman 2006, p. 211
1. The Singer in the Mist; 2. The Dream and the Shadow; 3. The Soul-Eater; 4. Haunting Columns; 5. The Last Hour
Three Sketches	24 + 34 + 30 for a total of 88 lines	You stole niggers, John Brown / Your only excuse, Abe Lincoln / I hesitate to name your name	The Collected Letters of Robert E. Howard, Volume 2: 1930–1932	2007			Letter:^{K} Tevis Clyde Smith, ca. May 1932	Herman 2006, p. 211
1. John Brown; 2. Abe Lincoln; 3. "John Kelley"
Voices of the Night					Echoing Shadows; The Iron Harp (1)^{N}			Herman 2006, p. 236

== Notes ==
Further explanations

- ^A These publications/dates indicate where and when these headings were first published independently of the works to which they were originally attached. (Lord 1976, p. 106)
- ^B These tentative titles were used by Glenn Lord as a means to identify the poems where no original title was available. (Lord 1976, pp. 106–107)
- ^C An early work is defined as one believed to have been written before 1924. (Lord 1976, p. 107)

Notes on publications

- ^D The Tattler was the newspaper of Brownwood High School. (Lord 1976, p. 107)
- ^E The Cross Plains Review is the weekly newspaper for Cross Plains, Texas. (Lord 1976, p. 107)
- ^F The Yellow Jacket is the newspaper of Howard Payne College. (Lord 1976, p. 107)
- ^G The Daniel Baker Collegian was the newspaper of Daniel baker College of Brownwood; the college has since merged with Howard Payne College. (Lord 1976, p. 107)
- ^H The Junto was a literary travelogue circulated from member to member on a mailing list from 1928 to 1930. (Lord 1976, p. 341)
- ^I The Golden Caliph (1922 or 1923, one issue) and The Right Hook (1925, three issues) were amateur magazines created by Robert E. Howard and Tevis Clyde Smith as teenagers. (Herman 2006, pp. 407 & 427)
- ^J The Progress was published by Cross Plains High School.

Notes on short hand

- ^K All or part of these poems are from or were included in a letter from Robert E. Howard to some recipient (the date is either the explicit date on the letter, an approximate dating of the letter where possible or else simply marked undated). e.g. "Letter: Tevis Clyde Smith, June 23, 1926" indicates that the poem is from a letter to Tevis Clyde Smith dated June 23, 1926.
- ^L These poems are in the public domain in the United States and any country where the Rule of the Shorter Term applies. (Herman 2007, Poems)
- ^M With these poems, two or more sources give different publications and dates of the first appearance. e.g. "Conflict: Lord (1976, p. 186), The Howard Collector, 1962/Herman (2006, p. 204), The Junto, 1929" indicates that Lord (1976, p. 186) states first publication as The Howard Collector (published in 1962), while Herman (2006, p. 204) states first publication as The Junto (published in 1929). Always listed with the earliest date first.
- ^N Howard sometimes used the same title more than once, or the same title has been attached to untitled works by others. In these cases the poems have been numbered to distinguish them. e.g. "(2)" following the title indicates that this the second poem with the same name.
- ^O These poems were published under a pen name. e.g. "Pen name: Patrick Howard" indicated that the poem was published under the pen name Patrick Howard.
- ^P These poems were first published in a non-American publication. e.g. "French" indicates that it was first published in a French book or magazine.
- ^R These poems are attributed to "Justin Geoffrey," a fictional poet Howard created for his fiction.
- ^S These poems were originally used as epigraphs, heading chapter and whole stories, in works of prose fiction. This list shows where they were printed separately from the prose. e.g. "Epigraph: The Phoenix on the Sword" indicates that the poem was used as an opening in the short story The Phoenix on the Sword.
- ^T These poems were part of a different work, usually prose fiction, but were not used to open the work or head chapters. This list shows where they were printed separately from the main work, if at all. e.g. "From: Men of the Shadows" indicates that this poem was originally included in, or part of, the short storyMen of the Shadows.
- ^U Poems with these titles are on record but no known copy exists today.

== See also ==
- List of works by Robert E. Howard
