= Shao Siming =

Chinese deity

- Lord of Fate; God of Destiny; God of Life
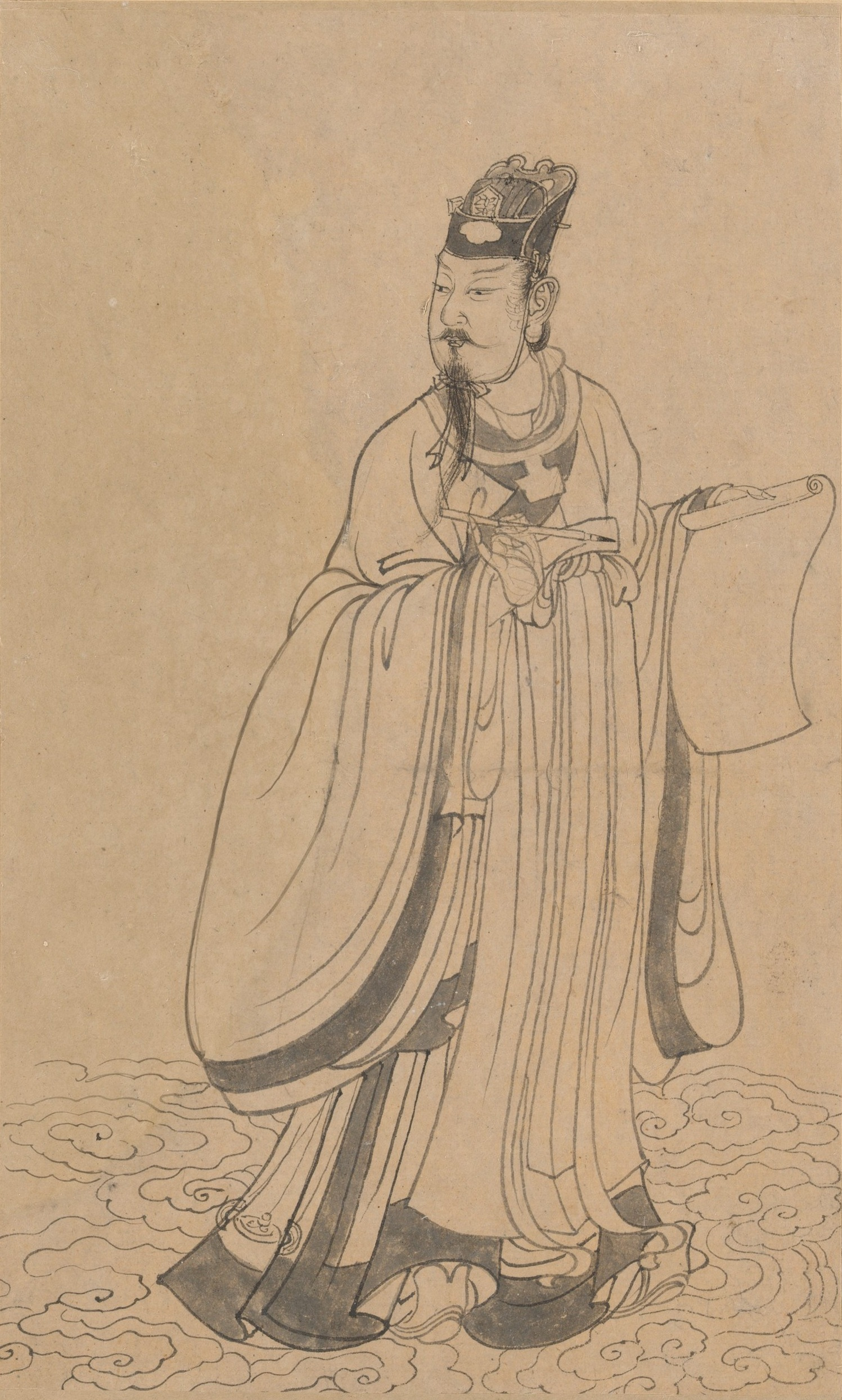
- Other names: Lesser Siming; Lord of Fate; Lesser Master of Fate
- Hanzi: 少司命
- Planet: Siming (24 Aquarii, 26 Aquarii); Wenchangsi (θ UMa)
- Weapon: Changjian (Long Sword)
- Texts: Jiu Ge
- Ethnic group: Han Chinese

Shao Siming (Chinese: 少司命; pinyin: Shǎo sī mìng) is an primordial Chinese deity of fate, paired with Da Siming (大司命) as one of a dual male dyadic pair of gods representing complementary aspects of destiny. His name has also been translated as Lesser Siming or The Lesser Master of Fate, The Young Lord of Fate.

Beginning in the mid-to-late 20th century, a minority of people began to depict Shao Siming and other deities as female figures, with Fu Baoshi (傅抱石)'s works being the first example. However, this did not stem from breakthroughs in academic research or the rediscovery of ancient traditions, but rather was mainly a product of the artist's personal aesthetic style within a specific historical context. During the same period, a few scholars cited the Western mythological paradigm and believed that Shao Siming might be a goddess, but due to the weak evidence, it was immediately rejected by scholars of the same era, such as Ji Yong (紀庸) and many others.

== Appearance ==
Shao Siming is often depicted as a handsome, well-dressed young gentleman, with facial hair tied into a traditional Chinese topknot bun (頭髻, Touji), dressed in Hanfu (漢服, Chinese traditional clothing) and a Chinese crown or hat. Occasionally, he is also depicted as a boy or teenager.

== Powers and duties ==
In the poem The Lesser Master of Fate (少司命) from the Jiu Ge (九歌) section of the ancient Chinese poetry anthology Chu Ci (楚辭), Shao Siming is depicted as wielding a Changjian (長劍, Chinese long double-edged straight sword), cradling a child and an elder, riding a chariot into the sky, touching and stroking a comet—a symbol of misfortune in Chinese culture. Mortals, filled with mixed emotions of joy and sorrow, expectation and resignation, accept and lament their subjugation by his will and arrangements. He is portrayed as possessing authority, capable of determining the rise and fall of every mortal clan, nation, or ethnic group.

Due to the ambiguity of the poems, Shao Siming is depicted in multiple forms. He is sometimes portrayed as wielding a Changjian, accompanied by ministers, driving a chariot , and controlling calamities, thus seen as someone who controls the rise and fall of the nation. Alternatively, he is depicted as wielding a Changjian and tender mugwort/Artemisia argyi (an important medicinal and exorcising plant in Chinese culture), driving a chariot , thus seen as someone who controls force, medicine, and exorcism. Furthermore, he is depicted embracing or possessing young, beautiful women, seen as a protector of women or a controller of women. He is also depicted as someone who cares for the elderly, women, or children, also depicted as a man fighting or protecting his family, and as someone who controls the death of children or the life of humankind, among other things.

However, due to the ambiguity of the poem, some believe him to be compassionate, a god of fate with a protective role, describing him as protecting the young and old and warding off misfortune. Others believe him to be cruel and merciless, bringing calamity to mortals and determining their prosperity and decline. Currently, the academic community has not reached a consensus on whether he is benevolent or ruthless, as the ambiguity of the poem allows for different interpretations from different perspectives.

Shao Siming is most authoritatively understood as the deity who governs the process of life—namely, youth and aging, and by extension, the prosperity and decline of clans and nations. His counterpart, Da Siming, in this framework, governs the boundaries of life: birth and death. This complementary dyad represents a conceptual division where Shao Siming controls the quality and journey of existence, while Da Siming controls its ultimate beginning and end.

However, some scholars propose a more literal division, interpreting Shao Siming as governing birth and Da Siming as governing death.

In summary, the diverse powers attributed to Shao Siming collectively define his role as a supreme arbiter of collective and individual destiny. His authority can be understood through several overarching domains:

- The Fate of Nations: Control over fortune, disasters, national strength, and the rise and fall of royal power, directly reflecting his role in determining the prosperity and decline of clans and states.
- The Fortune of the Household: Governance over the wealth and poverty of families.
- The Course of Human Life: Influence over critical life processes such as love, marriage, childbirth, and health (encompassing disease and medicine).
- Vitality and Its Application: Command over more abstract aspects of existence like personal luck, military affairs, and the quality of one's lifespan.

This comprehensive sphere of influence over the processes of life, from the personal to the political, solidifies his identity as the deity who governs the journey of existence itself.

== Worship ==
=== Ritual ===
China has two systems of sacrificial rituals: one is a public sacrificial ceremony performed by monarchs and feudal lords to pray for the well-being of the people and the nation; the other is a private sacrificial ceremony performed by their own families. Within these systems, different ranks and social classes had regulations governing the deities worshipped, the scale of the sacrifices, and the offerings. The specific offerings also varied according to the local agricultural products and livestock of the territory or state. Shao Siming and Da Siming belong to the list of gods worshipped by monarchs and feudal lords.

The worship of Shao Siming was intrinsically linked to the legitimacy and continuity of political power. When a new monarch ascended the throne, the sacrificial ceremony necessarily included rites for Shao Siming, seeking blessings for the new ruler's longevity and prosperity, thereby enabling him to effectively govern the nation. In a complementary fashion, the sacrificial ceremony following the death of a monarch required rites for Da Siming, appealing for the nation's continued longevity and prosperity, and ensuring the seamless continuation of the throne under the Eternal Mandate of Heaven (天命).

This ritual framework extended to the Zhuhou (諸侯, China's feudal lords) as well. The inauguration of a new lord demanded sacrifices to Shao Siming, while lord passing necessitated sacrifices to Da Siming.

According to the system prior to the Han dynasty, commoners were restricted to worshipping ancestors and household deities (such as the Kitchen God), whereas deities like Da Siming and Shao Siming were worshipped exclusively by the nobility.

=== Regional scope ===
Shao Siming and Da Siming are considered high-ranking deities. They were already worshipped in the ancient Tang and Yu period (唐虞時代, circa 21st century BCE to 20th century BCE), ruled by Yao (堯) and Shun (舜), and were initially regarded as gods in charge of sacrificial rites. and their worship had already spread throughout the entire Chinese region during the Spring and Autumn and Warring States periods (春秋戰國時期, c. 770-221 BC), and they were regarded as gods who controlled destiny.

=== Relation ===
Shao Siming and Da Siming share the same divine office, Sīmìng (司命). They are considered inseparable dual deities, each responsible for different aspects of the fate of all people and things, including the important concept of the Mandate of Heaven (天命) in Chinese culture. However, they are not the supreme chief deities, but rather ministers of the supreme chief deities, though their status is close to that of the supreme chief deities.

Shao Siming and Da Siming are not related; they are colleagues. Shao Siming is considered a subordinate deity of Da Siming, but the actual hierarchical difference between the two deities is not obvious; they appear to be partners.

Some scholars believe that Shao Siming is a deity who split off from Da Siming. Originally a single deity called Sīmìng (司命), after the split into two deities, the name Sīmìng became their collective title. Some scholars also believe that they were originally dualistic gods from the beginning, and Sīmìng is just a general term for them. Some scholars believe that both Shao Siming and Da Siming are deities derived from the supreme god. Some even argue that early Chinese mythology was a dualistic system, with two supreme gods representing different regions (north and south) within a single pantheon, and that Shao Siming and Da Siming were the respective deities of fate for these two supreme gods. Currently, scholars have not reached a definitive conclusion.

== Poetry ==
The poems related to Shao Siming originate from the Jiu Ge (九歌) collection, written over two thousand years ago during the Warring States period (戰國時期) by Qu Yuan (屈原), a nobleman and poet of the Chu (楚).

Illustration of "Nine Songs". Ink on paper, handscroll by Li Gonglin, Mi Fu.
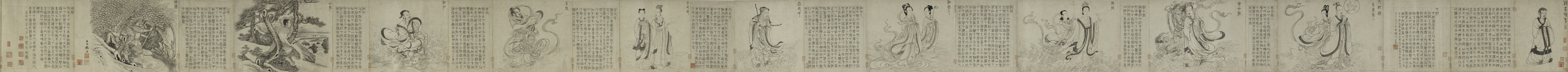
Illustration of "Nine Songs". Ink on paper, handscroll by Zhang Wo.
Illustration of "Nine Songs". Ink on paper, handscroll by Zhang Wo and Chu Huan, Wei Ceng.

Some scholars believe that Jiu Ge's poems are interconnected, thus there are correspondences between Shao Siming's poems and Da Siming's related poems.

=== Narrative Perspective and Interpretation ===
The poem presents significant challenges regarding its narrative perspective. Scholars have proposed various frameworks: it may be voiced entirely by WūXí (巫覡, Chinese shamans), by Shao Siming himself, or it may enact a dialogue between Shao Siming and Da Siming, or between the deity and a mortal or shamanic interlocutor. The possibility of three or more distinct voices has also been raised. As such, there is no definitive academic consensus on this matter.

=== Political Allegory ===
Beyond its mythological surface, the Jiu Ge is widely understood as a work rich with political allegory. In this context, Shao Siming can be interpreted as an allusion to the king. A critical piece of evidence for this reading is Qu Yuan's use of the aromatic herb Sūn (蓀) to designate the deity. Sūn is one of only two herbs (the other being Quán 荃) that Qu Yuan consistently employs in his poetry as a metaphor for the ruler. This deliberate lexical choice strengthens the theory that the poem uses the divine relationship between the WūXí and the god to explore the ideal, and perhaps fraught, relationship between a minister and his sovereign.

=== Original poem ===
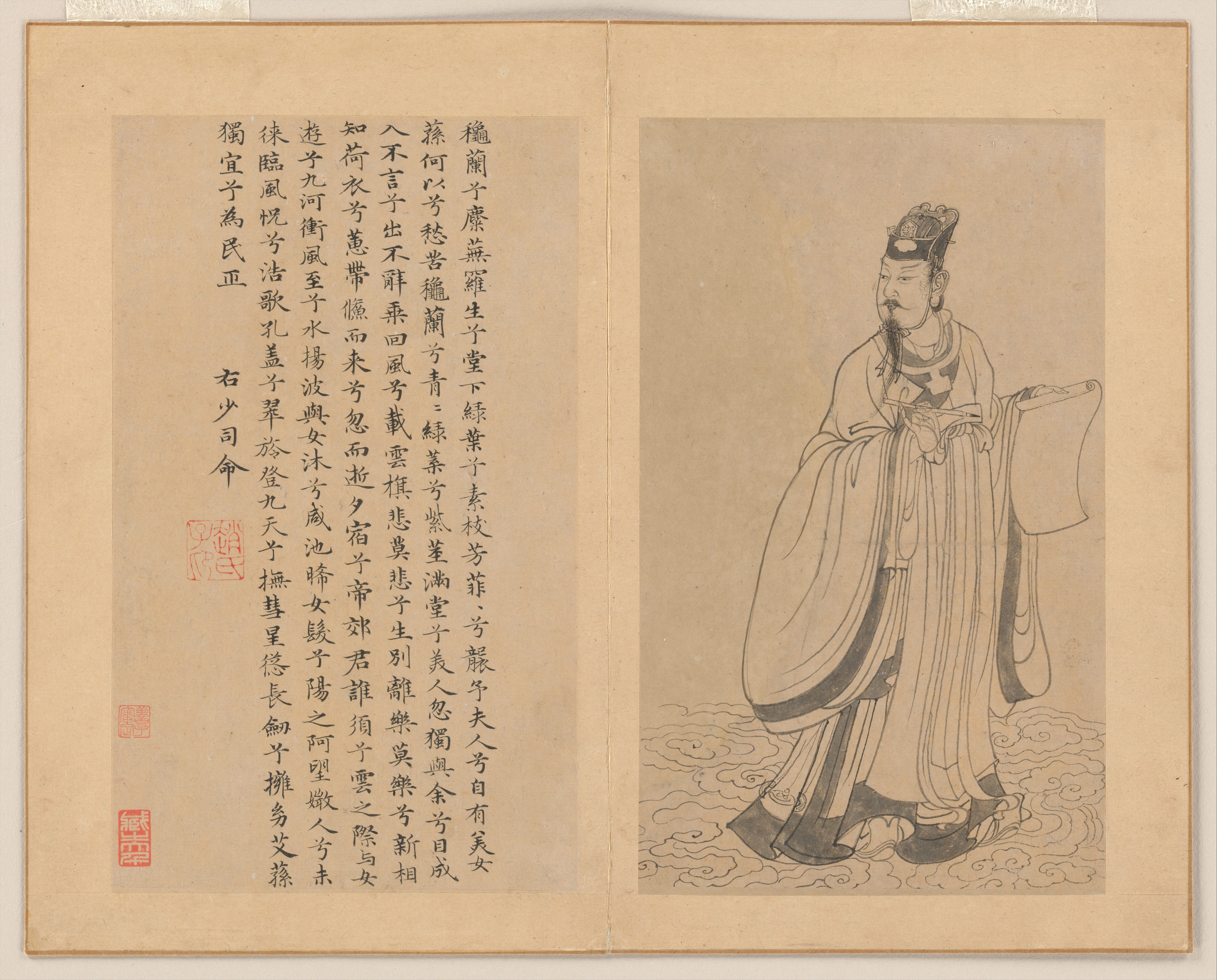
Illustrated version of the poem "Lesser Master of Fate", probably fourteenth century

秋蘭兮麋蕪，羅生兮堂下。
綠葉兮素華，芳菲菲兮襲予。
夫人自有兮美子，蓀何㠯兮愁苦？
秋蘭兮青青，綠葉兮紫莖。
滿堂兮美人，忽獨與余兮目成。
入不言兮出不辭，乘迴風兮載雲旗。
悲莫悲兮生別離，樂莫樂兮新相知。
荷衣兮蕙帶，儵而來兮忽而逝。
夕宿兮帝郊，君誰須兮雲之際？
與女遊兮九河，衝風至兮水揚波。
望美人兮未來，臨風怳兮浩歌。
孔蓋兮翠旌，登九天兮撫彗星。
竦長劍兮擁幼艾，蓀獨宜兮爲民正。

— 屈原, 九歌-少司命

== Astronomy and Astrology ==
He and Da Siming are also considered celestial asterism, and they are considered an asterism called "Siming" (司命).

In Chinese astronomy and Chinese astrology, the astronomical Siming (actually part of asterism 虛, "Emptiness") consists of the Deified Judge of Life star group. Sīmìngyī (24 Aquarii, 司命一) and Sīmìngèr (26 Aquarii, 司命二).

As an asterism, or apparent stellar constellation, Siming is associated both with the Wenchang Wang (文昌帝君) star pattern, near the Big Dipper, in Aquarius, and with a supposed celestial bureaucrat official of fate.

In addition, Wénchāngsì (θ UMa, 文昌四) in the Ursa Major is also considered to be the star that corresponds solely to Shao Siming. It is the fourth star in the constellation Wenchang (文昌) within the Ziwei enclosure (紫微垣), one of the Three Enclosures (三垣) of Chinese constellations.

== Art ==
In ancient poetry, Shao Siming is depicted riding in a chariot adorned with fluttering emerald banners, ribbons, and peacock feathers, holding a long sword (長劍) in one hand and carrying the elderly and children in the other. However, in paintings, he is not always shown holding weapons or carrying the elderly and children, nor is he always depicted driving a chariot. Sometimes he carries scrolls and brushes, and sometimes he returns empty-handed. In some paintings, he is followed by maids or servants, while in others they are not. Some paintings even depict only his back. This may be due to the ambiguity of the poetry or the artist's creativity.

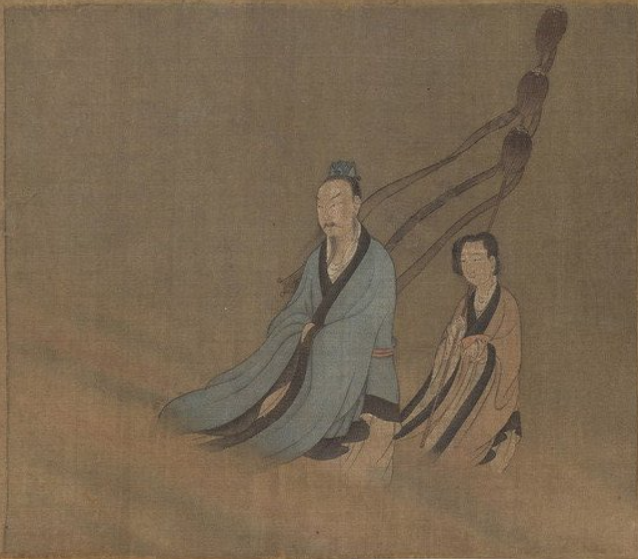
A partial view of Zhang Dunli's Nine Songs Scroll from the Song Dynasty, featuring an image of Shao Siming.

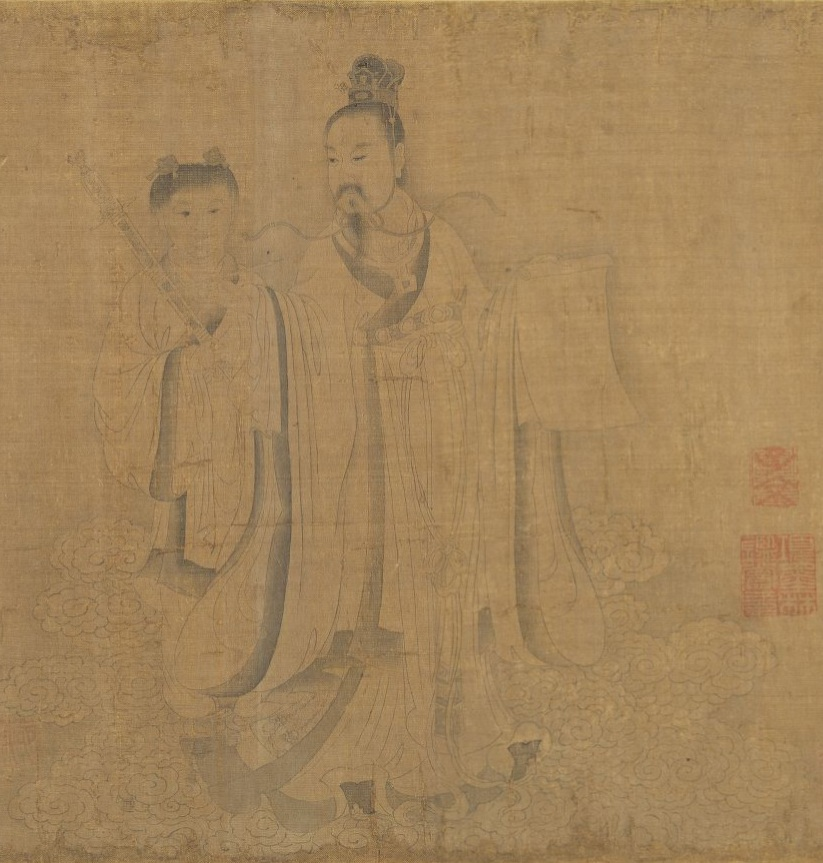
A partial view of Li Gonglin's Nine Songs Scroll from the Song Dynasty, featuring an image of Shao Siming.

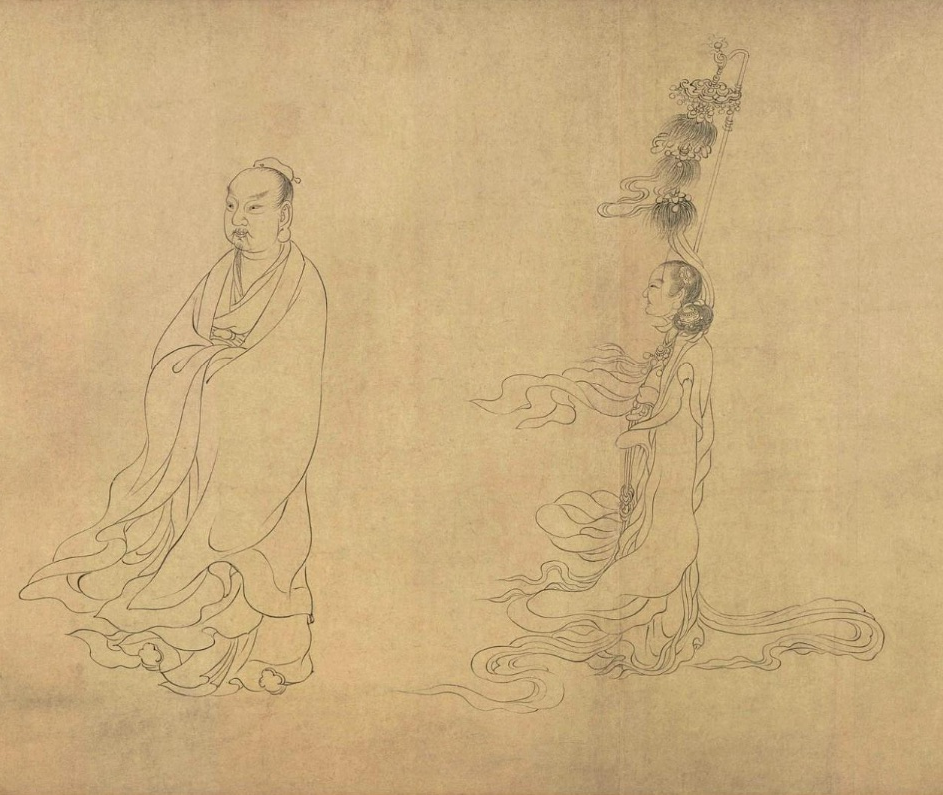
The "Nine Songs" painting from the Song Dynasty.

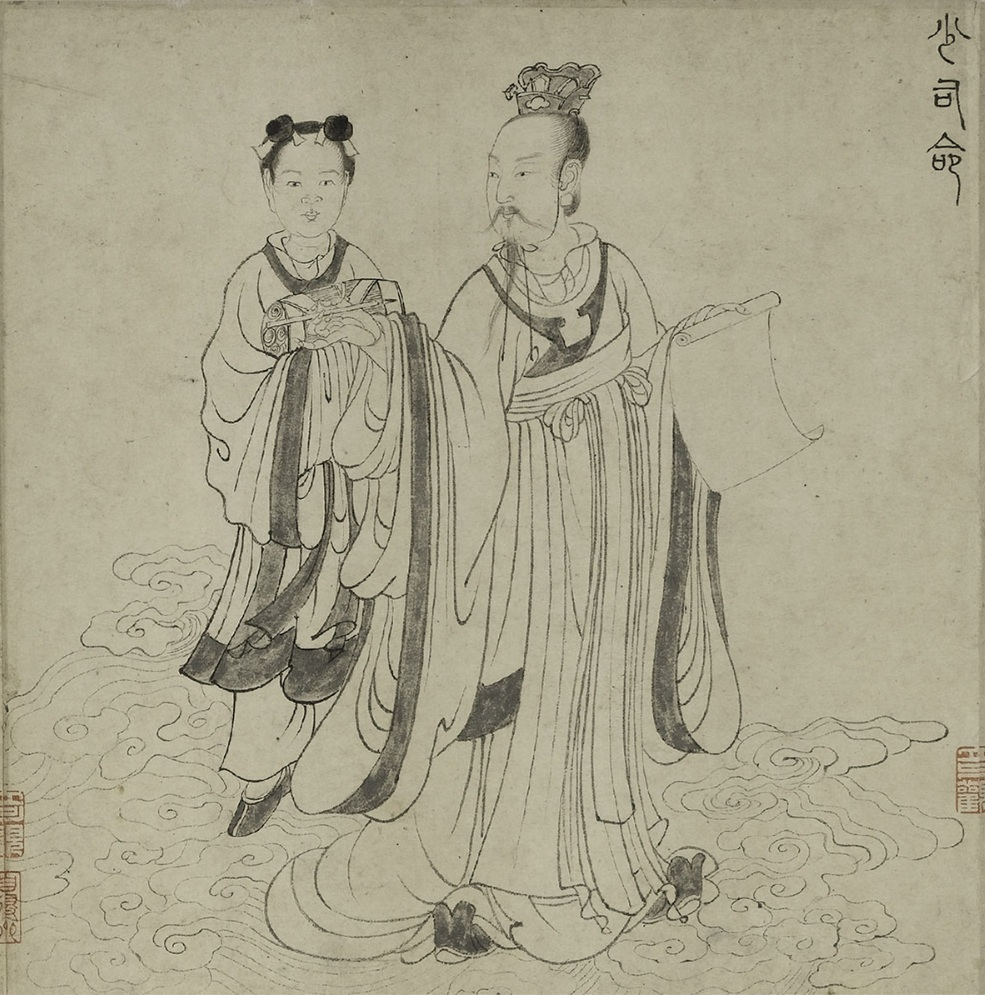
A partial view of Zhang Wo's Nine Songs Scroll from the Yuan Dynasty, featuring an image of Shao Siming.

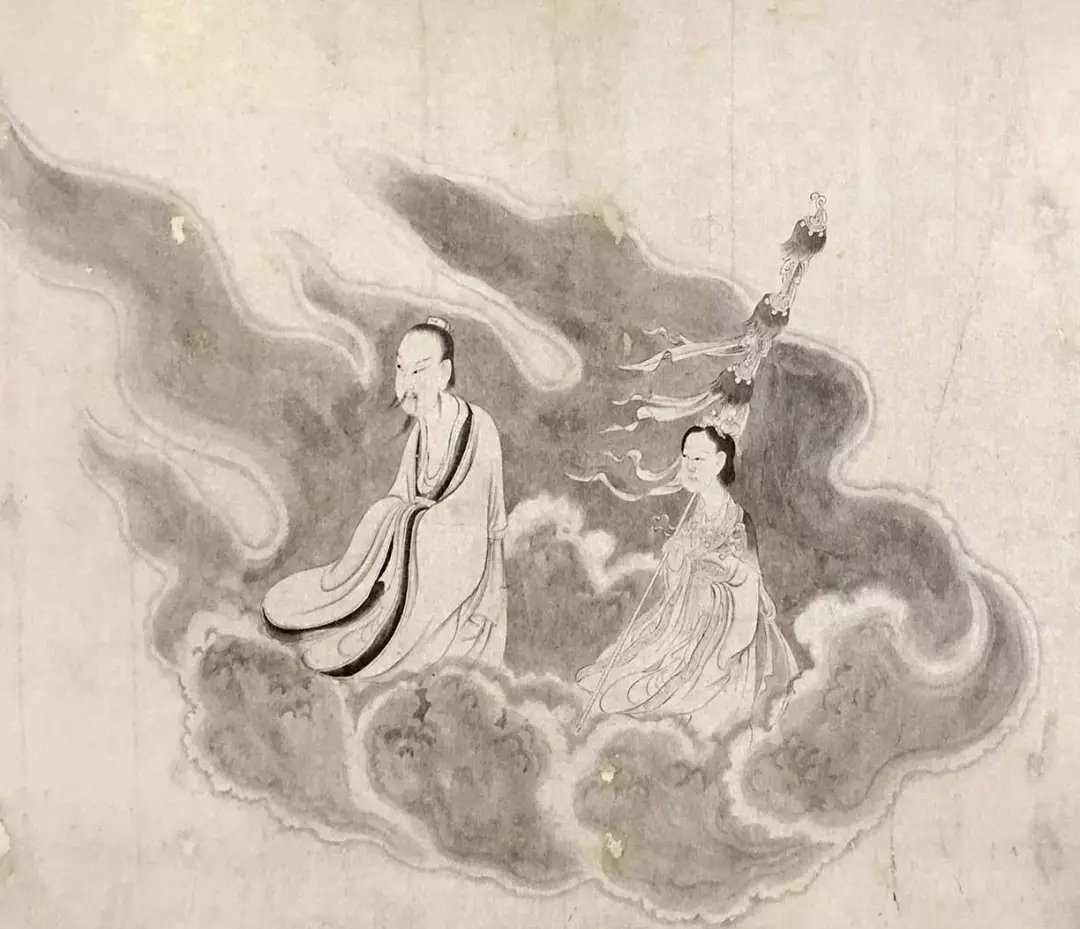
A partial view of the unsigned "Nine Songs" painting in the Zhejiang Provincial Museum – featuring the character Shao Siming, possibly dating from the early 14th century.

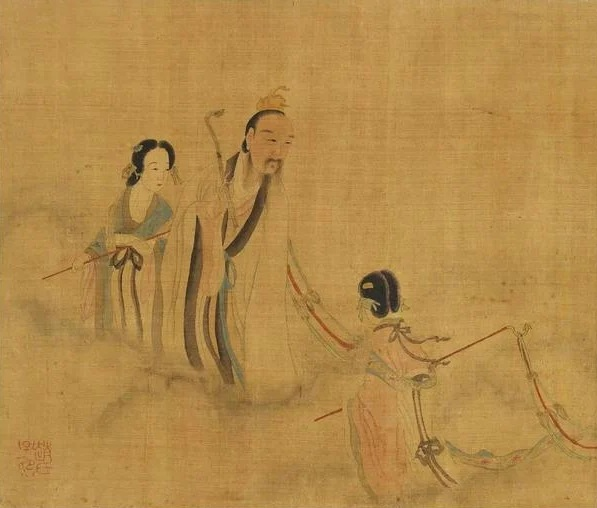
A partial view of Zhao Mengfu's Nine Songs Scroll from the Yuan Dynasty, featuring an image of Shao Siming.

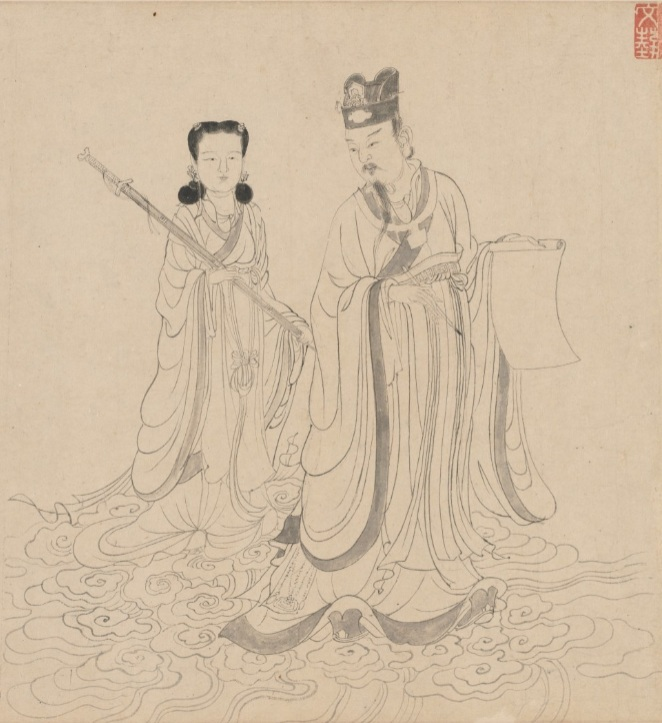
A partial view of Chu Huan, Wei Ceng, Zhang Wo's Nine Songs Scroll from the Yuan Dynasty, featuring an image of Shao Siming.

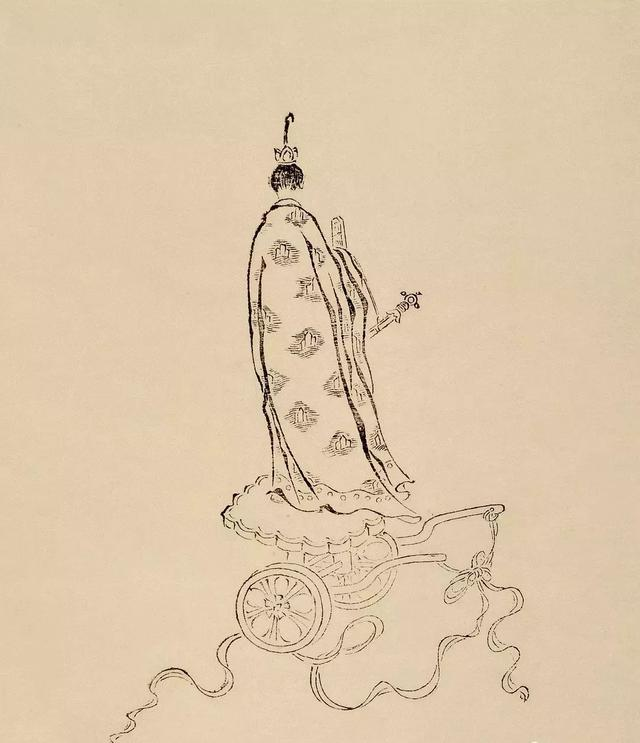
Portrait of Shao Siming, painted by Chen Hongshou, circa Ming Dynasty.

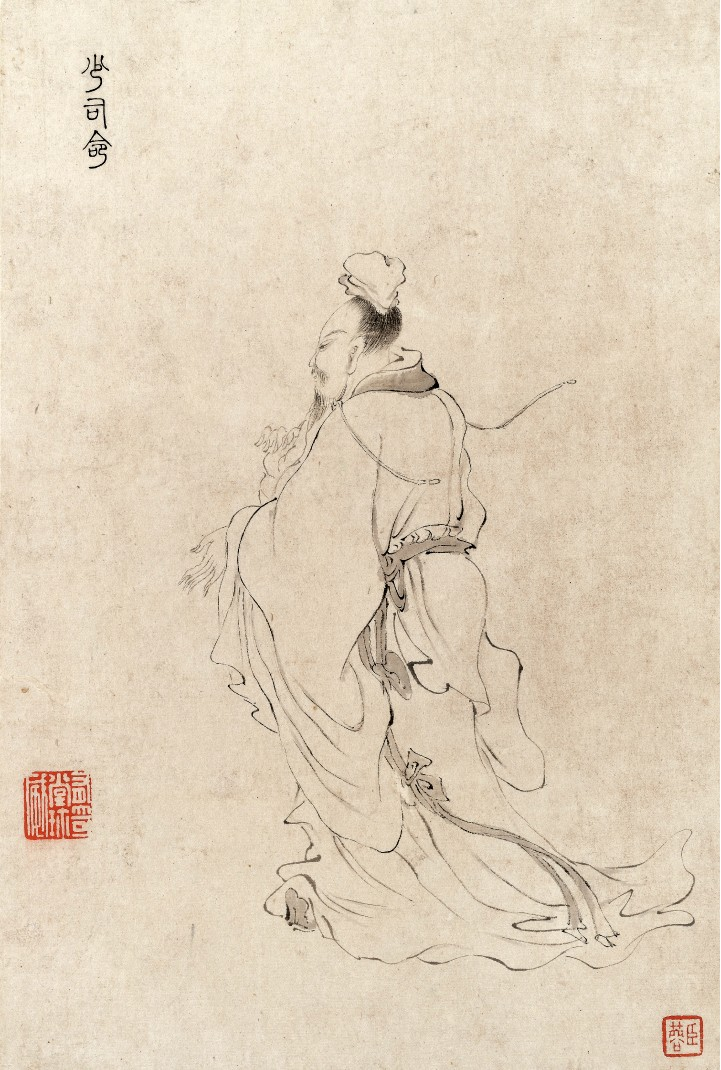
The character Shao Siming in Jiang Rong's "Nine Songs" painting, from the Qing Dynasty.

== Pop Culture ==
A character known as Shao Siming appears in the Chinese animated series The Legend of Qin (秦時明月).

== See also ==
- Siming (deity)
- Jiu Ge
- Chu Ci
- List of Chu Ci contents
- Qu Yuan
- Chu (state)
