= Jiu Ge =

Chinese set of poems

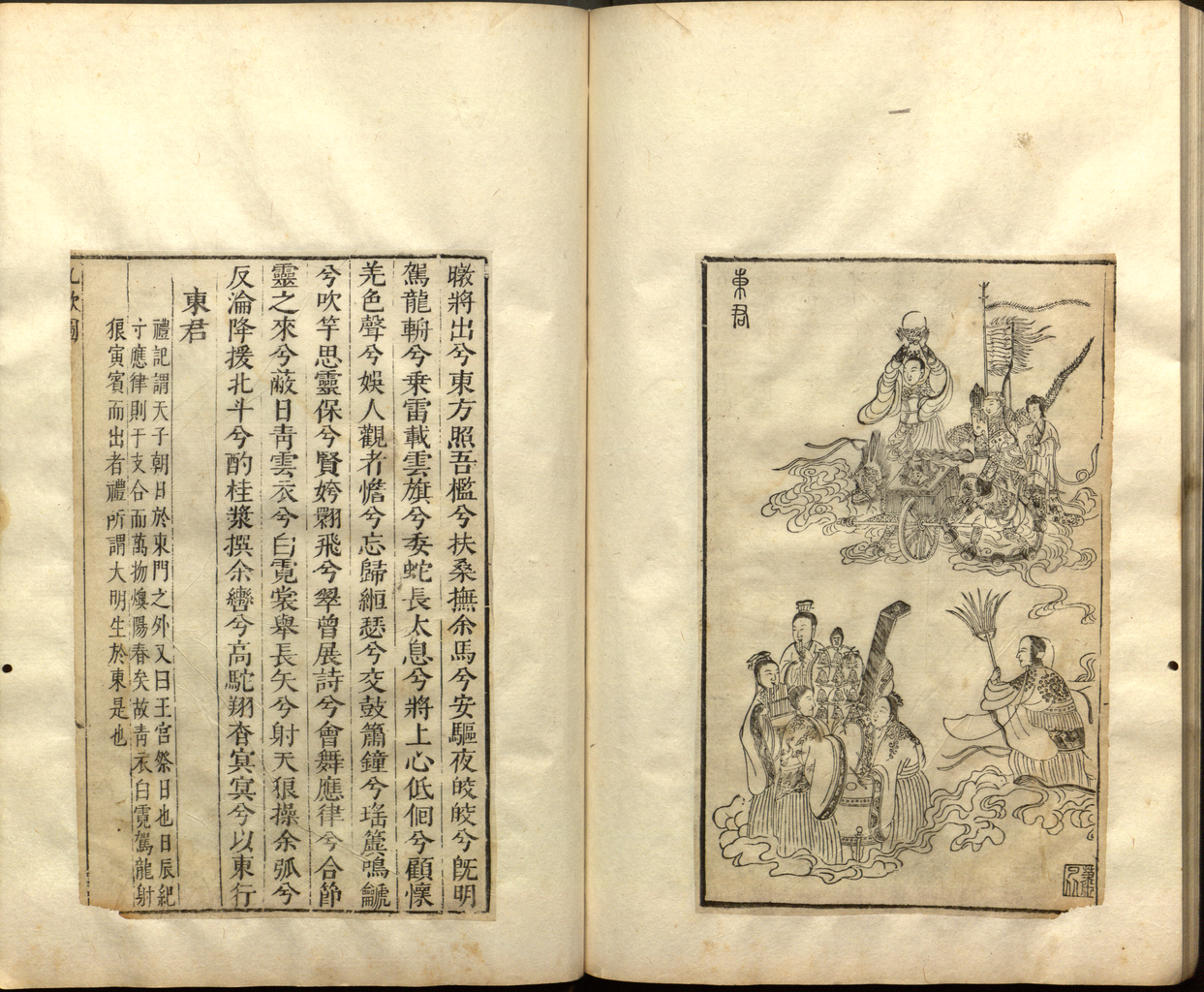
The "Lord of the East" ("Dong Jun") poem number 7 of the Nine Songs, illustrated version reprint from 1645.

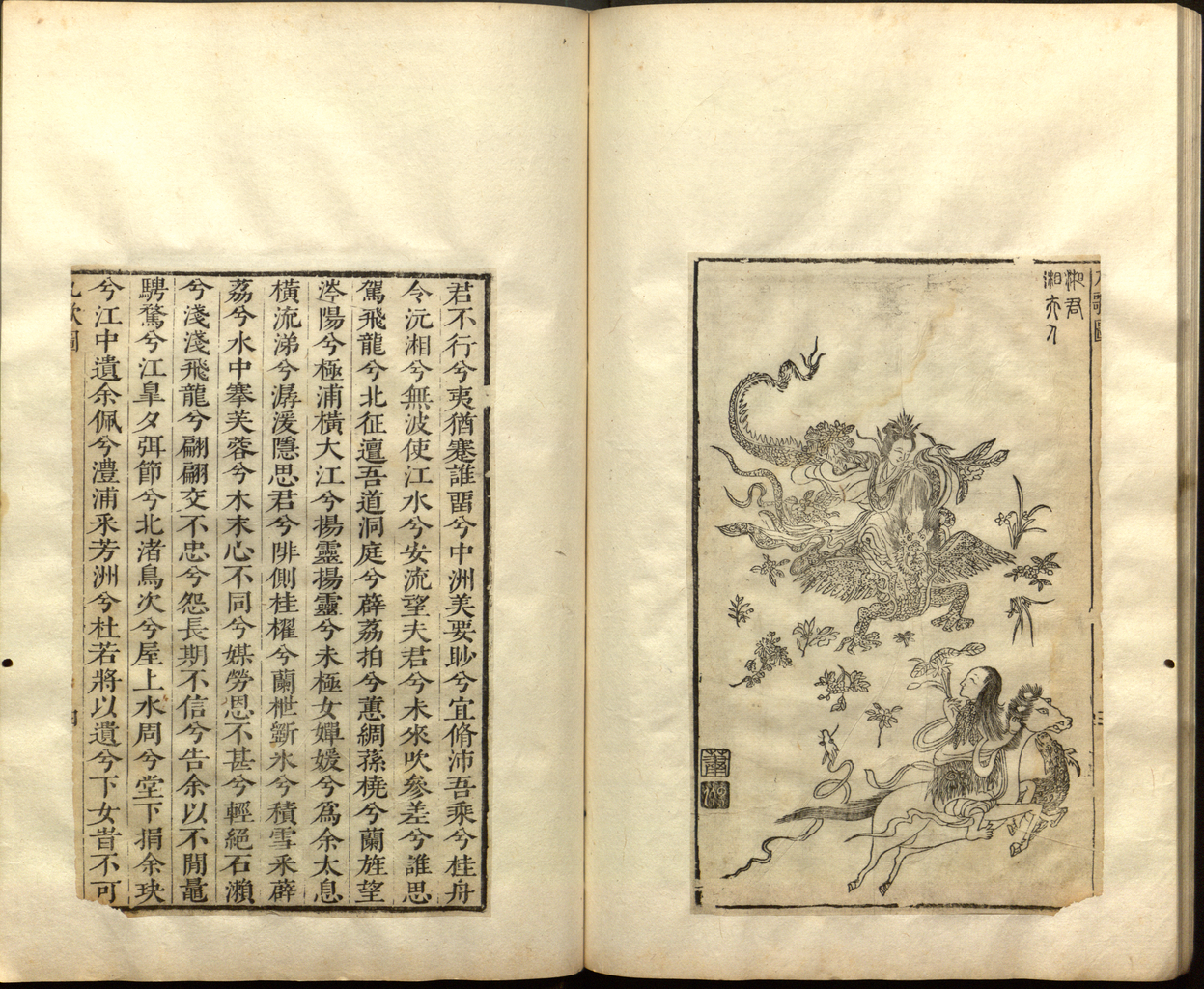
"Xiang River Goddesses" (Xiang Jun), poem number 3 of 11 in the Nine Songs section, in an annotated version of Chu Ci, published under title Li Sao, attributed to Qu Yuan and illustrated by Xiao Yuncong.

Jiu Ge, or Nine Songs, (Chinese: 九歌; pinyin: Jiǔ Gē; lit. 'Nine Songs') is an ancient set of poems. Together, these poems constitute one of the 17 sections of the poetry anthology which was published under the title of the Chuci (also known as the Songs of Chu or as the Songs of the South). Despite the "Nine", in the title, the number of these poetic pieces actually consists of eleven separate songs, or elegies. This set of verses seems to be part of some rituals of the Yangzi River valley area (as well as a northern tradition or traditions) involving the invocation of divine beings and seeking their blessings by means of a process of courtship. Though the poetry consists of lyrics written for a performance, the lack of indications of who is supposed to be singing at any one time or whether some of the lines represent lines for a chorus makes an accurate reconstruction impossible. Nonetheless there are internal textual clues, for example indicating the use of costumes for the performers, and an extensive orchestra.

== Authorship and dating ==
In common with other Chuci works, the authorship of these 11 poems has been attributed to the poet Qu Yuan, who lived over two-thousand years ago. Sinologist David Hawkes finds evidence for this eclectic suite of eleven poems having been written by "a poet (or poets) at the Chu court in Shou-chun (241–223) B.C."

== Text ==
The "Jiu Ge" songs include eleven (despite the "Nine" in the title). Nine of the verses are addressed to deities by a type of shaman, one to the spirits of fallen warriors who died fighting far from home, and the concluding verse. The reason for the discrepancy between the 9 verses referred to in the title and the fact that there are actually 11 is uncertain, although an important question, which has had several possible explanations put forth. Of these explanations, some may be rooted in general Chinese number magic or symbology. More specifically, David Hawkes points out that "nine songs" is referenced in the seminal Chu Ci work, Li Sao, referring to the nine (twice times nine?) dances of Qi of Xia.

=== Why nine? ===
Critics and scholars have elaborated various hypotheses as to why the Jiu Ge ("Nine Songs") consists of eleven songs, rather than nine. An obvious, and common, suggestion has been that Number 1 and Number 11 songs are somehow to be classified as an introduction and a luan: examination of Song 1 and Song 11 fails to support this convenient conjecture, however. Sinologists Masaru Aoki and David Hawkes propose that for performance purposes there were nine songs/dances performed at each a spring and at an autumn performance, with the spring performance featuring Songs 3 and 5, but not 4 or 6, and the autumnal performance 4 and 6, but not 3 or 5 (with the songs otherwise being performed in numerical order). Another explanation has to do with ancient ideas about numbers and numbering, where by the use of a numeric term, an order of magnitude, estimation, or other symbolic qualities are meant, rather than a specific quantity. 11 songs could be "about 9" songs.

=== List of contents ===
The following table shows the eleven individual poems of the Nine Songs. The English translations are following those of David Hawkes, although he uses Roman numerals for the traditional song order.

1. The Great Unity, God of the Eastern Sky (东皇太一; 東皇太一; Dong Huang Tai Yi)

2. The Lord within the Clouds (云中君; 雲中君; Yun Zhong Jun)

3. The God of the Xiang (湘君; Xiang Jun)

4. The Lady of the Xiang (湘夫人; Xiang Fu Ren)

5. The Greater Master of Fate (大司命; Da Si Ming)

6. The Lesser Master of Fate (少司命; Shao Si Ming)

7. The Lord of the East (东君; 東君; Dong Jun)

8. The River Earl (河伯; He Bo)

9. The Mountain Spirit (山鬼; Shan Gui)

10. Hymn to the Fallen (国殇; 國殤; Guo Shang)

11. Honouring the Dead (礼魂; 禮魂; Li Hun)

=== Illustrated versions ===
Illustrated versions of the Chuci exist. Below is a selection from the "Nine Songs":

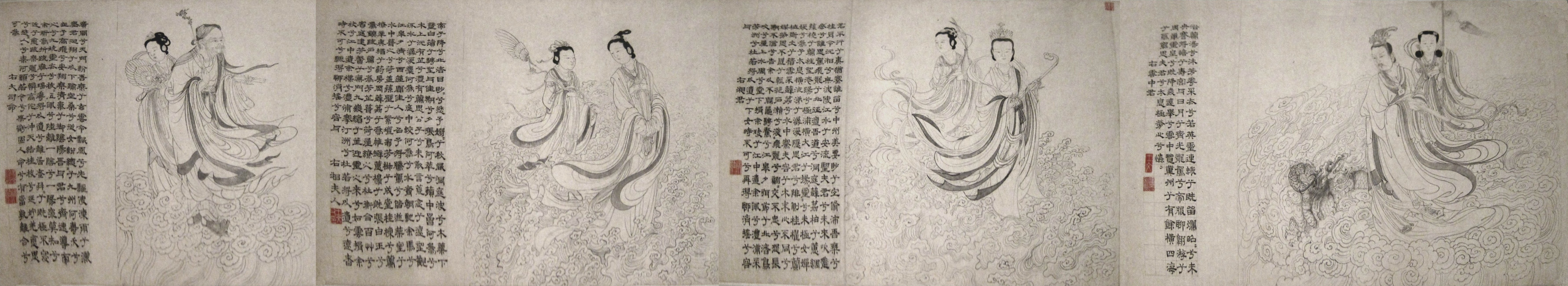
Illustration of "Nine Songs", detail. Ink on paper, handscroll by Zhang Wo, 1361, Cleveland Museum of Art. From right-to-left (in the normal Classical Chinese direction of reading) showing poems 2, 3, 4, and 5.

== Divine beings ==
Of the 11 songs of the "Jiu Ge", 9 are addressed to deities and 1 to the spirits of dead heroes (the last verse section is a conclusional cauda). These deities include He Bo, also known as the River Earl or as the Count of the River, and the Lord (or God) of the Clouds.

=== Donghuang Taiyi ===
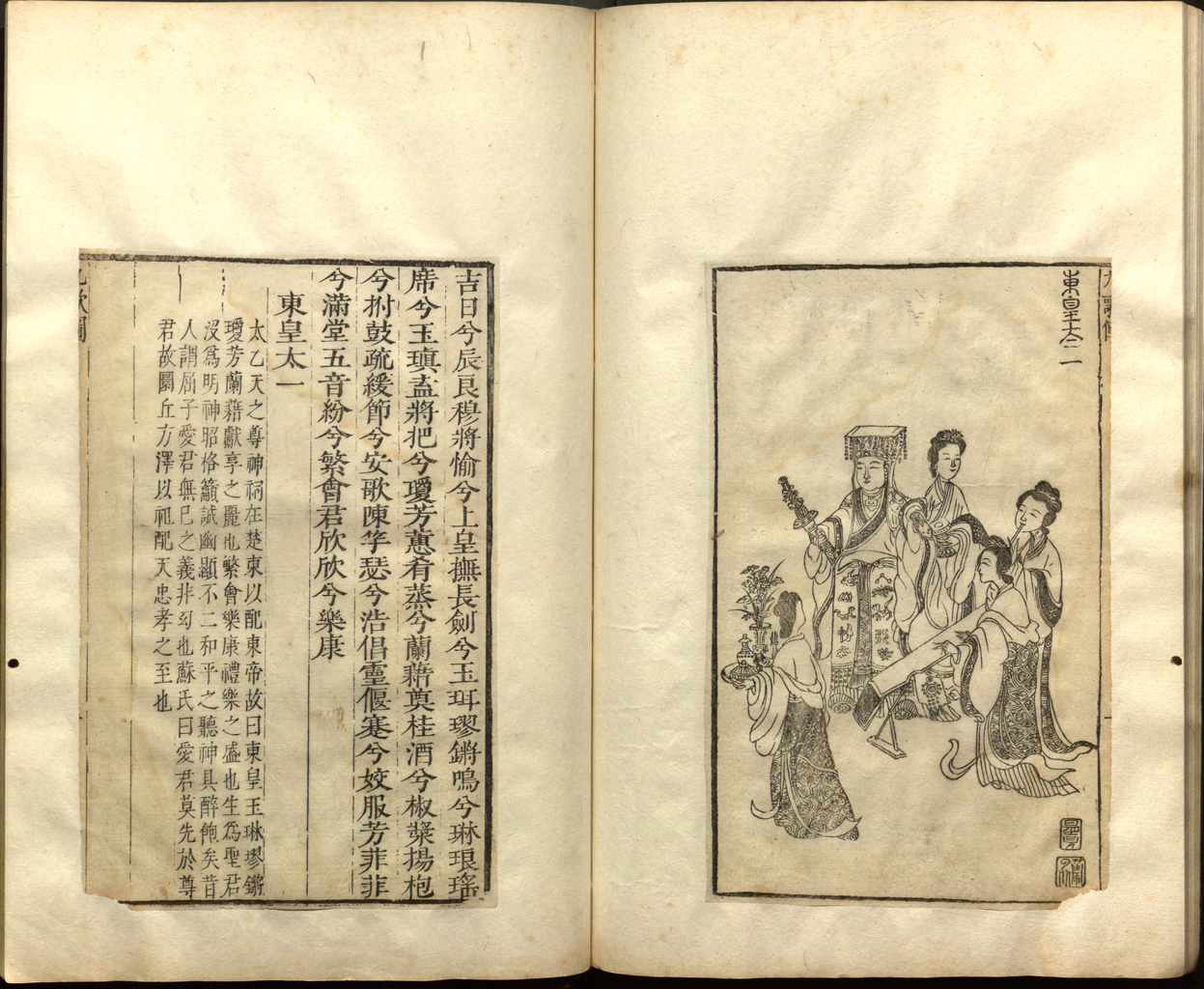
From illustrated version of poem, depicting Donghuang Taiyi

.

The character with which Song 1 concerns itself is Donghuang Taiyi, combining the terms Taiyi and Donghuang. This is not a common concept in previous Chinese historical sources. The character of this divinity resolves readily as two familiar parts, here coupled together.

=== God of Clouds ===
The God of Clouds (Yunzhong Jun) was worshipped in the hope of rain and good weather for crops. This poem can be divided into two parts: one part is sung by the person who does the offering and the other part is sung by the person who acts as the God of Clouds in the form of antiphonal singing in order to show their admiration towards her. This poem expresses the characteristics of the God of Clouds, the deep desire that human have towards God, and how God responds to people's prayer through the antiphonal singing of human and God.

=== He Bo, the Earl of Yellow River ===
The Earl of Yellow River (one of the world's major rivers, and one with close association with Chinese Culture) has been associated with control of that wild river's occasional devastating floods and general qualities as an agricultural aquifer.

=== Lord of the East ===
The Lord of the East is the sun, in his aspect as a deity of the morning.

=== Master of Fate ===
The Master of Fate is known as Siming (司命) with various English translations (such as, Controller of Fate, Deified Judge of Life, and Director of Destinies). Siming is both an abstract deity (or more rather title thereof) and a celestial asterism. In the Daoist case of the Three Worms, Siming, as Director of Destinies, has the bureaucratic function of human lifespan allocation. As an asterism, or apparent stellar constellation, Siming is associated both with the Wenchang Wang star pattern, near the Big Dipper, in (Aquarius (Chinese astronomy)), and with a supposed celestial bureaucrat official of fate.

The astronomical Siming (actually part of asterism 虛, "Emptiness") consists of the Deified Judge of Life star group. Sīmìngyī: (24 Aquarii, 司命一) and Sīmìngèr (26 Aquarii, 司命二).

The earthly Siming has the bureaucratic function of human lifespan allocation.

=== Qu Yuan ===
Qu Yuan is the protagonist and author of much of the Chu ci opus: whether or not he wrote the Jiu ge pieces while he was in exile is an open question. Certainly the work appears underlain by earlier tradition, as well as possible editing during the reign of Han Wudi. Whether he makes a cameo appearance is also not known.

=== Shaman ===
The shamanic voice is an important part of the proceedings here.

=== Shan Gui, the Mountain Spirit ===
Shan Gui (山鬼), literally "Mountain Spirit" is here actually a goddess who is "lovesick" and pining for her lord. See (§Mountain Spirit below).

=== Spirits of the Fallen and the Dead ===
Presupposing some sort of continuation of life after death: ghosts or spirits.

=== Taiyi ===
Taiyi also known as: Tai Yi, Great Unity, and so on, is a familiar deity from the Chinese Daoist/shamanic tradition.

=== Xiang River Deities ===
The deities of the Xiang waters, are the Xiangshuishen. Various conceptions of them exist. Of these conceptions, one set consists of ancient folk belief, and another of more modern interpretation.

== Individual poems ==
The individual poems of the Jiu Ge are related to each other as parts of a religious drama, meant for performance; however, the individual roles of each and their relationship to each other is a matter for interpretive reinterpretation, rather than something known.

Some aspects of the dramatic performance are known, mostly through internal evidence. The performances were evidently replete with fantastic shamanic costumes, were probably performed indoors, and with orchestral accompaniment to the tune of "lithophones, musical bells, drums, and various kinds of wind and string instruments."

However, in the case of any individual poem, its role in the overall performance is not necessarily determinable. They may represent monologues, dialogues, choral pieces, or combinations thereof, within the individual pieces or between them.

The titles of the individual poems which follow are loosely based on David Hawkes:

=== East Emperor/Grand Unity ===
The first Jiu ge poetic piece is a dedication to a deity ("Dong huang tai yi").

=== Lord in the Clouds ===
The second Jiu ge poetic piece addresses another deity ("Yun-zhong jun").

=== Xiang deity (two titles) ===
The third and fourth Jiu ge poetic pieces involve a deity, male, female, singular or plural: the Chinese is not marked for number or gender ("Xiang jun" and "Xiang fu-ren").

=== Master of Fate (two titles) ===
The fifth and sixth Jiu ge poetic pieces involve a deity singular or plural: the Chinese is not clear as to whether the "lesser" and "greater" in the titles refers to a distinction between the two Siming (Master of Fate) poems or if it refers to a distinction between two Siming, Masters of Fate ("Xiang jun" and "Xiang fu-ren").

=== East Lord ===
The seventh Jiu ge poetic piece addresses involves the deity "Dong jun".

=== River Earl ===
The eighth Jiu ge poetic piece involves another deity ("Hebo").

=== Mountain Spirit ===
The ninth Jiu ge poetic piece addresses the Shan gui which is literally "Mountain Spirit", but here she is rather a Mountain Goddess, wearing clothing of climbing-fig vine (Note: Xu renders as "ivy", but bili (薜茘) answers to Ficus pumila.) and a girdle of dodder (or hanging moss). (Note: Xu renders as "sweet grass", but the plant nüluo (女蘿) is considered to be either dodder (tusi "hare floss" 菟絲 or Cuscuta chinensis) or bearded moss (Usnea lichen).) She is possibly to be identified with the Wushan Mountain goddess, Yaoji, and this "lovesick fairy queen" of the mount is presumably "waiting for King Xiang of Chu". She is depicted as "riding a red leopard and holding a wen li (patterned wildcat, 文貍)", (Note: Which commentators equate with a "divine leopard cat 神貍", i.e., civet cat.) or perhaps rather riding a fragrant car (Note: Literally a "magnolia" (辛夷) car.) drawn by these "leopards".

=== Hymn to the Fallen ===
The tenth Jiu ge poem (Guo shang) is a hymn to soldiers killed in war ("Guo shang"). Guó (國) means the "state", "kingdom", or "nation". Shāng (殤) means to "die young". Put together, the title refers to those who meet death in the course of fighting for their country. David Hawkes describes it as "surely one of the most beautiful laments for fallen soldiers in any language". The meter is a regular seven-character verse, with three characters separated by the exclamatory particle "兮" followed by three more characters, each composing a half line, for a total of nine lines of 126 characters.

==== Background ====
The historical background of the poem involves the ancient type of warfare practiced in ancient China. Included are references to arms and weapons, ancient states or areas, and the mixed use of chariots in warfare. A good historical example of this type of contest is the "Battle of Yanling", which features similar characteristics and problems experienced by participants in this type of fighting, such as greatly elevated mortality rates for both horses and humans.

==== Poem ====
The poem is translated as "Battle" by Arthur Waley (1918, in A Hundred and Seventy Chinese Poems)

BATTLE
....

“We grasp our battle-spears: we don our breast-plates of hide.
The axles of our chariots touch: our short swords meet.
Standards obscure the sun: the foe roll up like clouds.
Arrows fall thick: the warriors press forward.
They menace our ranks: they break our line.
The left-hand trace-horse is dead: the one on the right is smitten.
The fallen horses block our wheels: they impede the yoke-horses!”

They grasp their jade drum-sticks: they beat the sounding drums.
Heaven decrees their fall: the dread Powers are angry.

The warriors are all dead: they lie on the moor-field.
They issued but shall not enter: they went but shall not return.
The plains are flat and wide: the way home is long.

Their swords lie beside them: their black bows, in their hand.
Though their limbs were torn, their hearts could not be repressed.
They were more than brave: they were inspired with the spirit of
“Wu.”
Steadfast to the end, they could not be daunted.
Their bodies were stricken, but their souls have taken Immortality–
Captains among the ghosts, heroes among the dead.

I.e., military genius.

=== Honoring the Dead ===
The eleventh Jiu ge poetic piece concludes the corpus ("Li hun").

== Translations ==
The first translation of the Nine Songs into a European language was done by the Viennese scholar August Pfizmaier (1808–1887). Over 100 years later Arthur Waley (1889–1966) accredited it as "an extremely good piece of work, if one considers the time when it was made and the meagreness of the material to which Pfizmaier had access."

== See also ==
- Chariots in ancient China
- Taiyi
- Chu ci
- Chu (state)
- Jiu Zhang
- He Bo
- List of Chuci contents
- Liu An
- Liu Xiang (scholar)
- Qin (state)
- Qu Yuan
- Rhinoceroses in ancient China
- Xiao (mythology)
- Simians (Chinese poetry)
- Song Yu
- Wang Yi (librarian)
- Wu (武) at Wiktionary
- Wu (state)
- Xiang River goddesses
- Xiao (mythology)
- Yunzhongzi
- Shao Siming
- Siming (deity)
