= Siming (deity) =

Chinese male deity

A temple in Taiwan, where a consortium of deities are worshiped, including Siming, as "Siming, True Lord" (司命真君/Sīmìng zhēnjūn)

Siming (Chinese: 司命; pinyin: Sīmìng) refers to a Chinese male deity or deified functionary of that title who makes fine adjustments to human fate, with various English translations (such as, the Master of Fate, Controller of Fate, Deified Judge of Life, Arbiter of Fate, Director of Allotted Life Spans, and Director of Destinies). Siming is both an abstract deity (or title thereof) and a celestial asterism.

Siming, as Director of Destinies, has the bureaucratic function of human lifespan allocation. Siming seems to have roots in the shamanic traditions, then later to have somewhat assimilated with the Kitchen God, as in the Daoist case of the Three Worms, in which Siming becomes a deity to whom home household activities are periodically reported,

As an asterism, or apparent stellar constellation, Siming is associated with the Wenchang Wang star pattern, near the Big Dipper, in what is more or less Aquarius.

Sometimes the term Siming is qualified by 大 (da, meaning "big" or "greater") or by 少 (shao, meaning "small" or "lesser").

== Siming (deity) ==
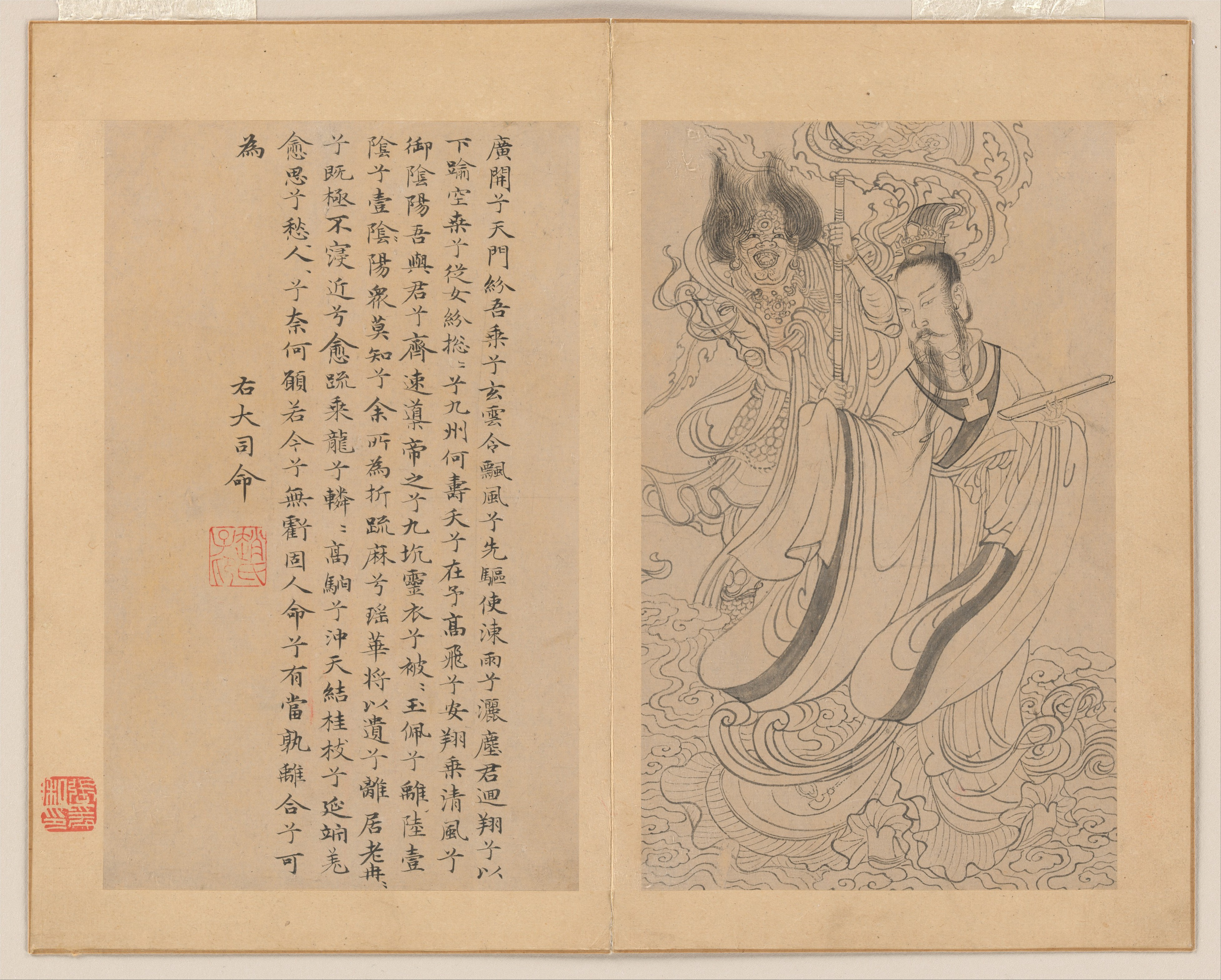
From an illustrated version of the Chuci poetry anthology section "Nine Songs" (Jiu ge), poem the "Greater Master of Fate"

The Siming deity has the bureaucratic function of human lifespan allocation. In bureaucratic terms, Si (司) is a common term, meaning "in charge of", "a person or department which is in charge of something", often translated as "secretary". Commonly, in real life or in imagined bureaucracies, there were Chief and Assistant Secretaries (Dasi and Shaosi). Ming (命) is a complicated word with a long folk and technical history, basically meaning "life" or "the balance of fate or destiny", personified as Siming. Often, a deified entity such as Siming receives increased sanctity over time, signified by additional official titles.

=== Powers and duties ===
As a deity Siming takes his, her, or their place in a complex cosmological system of Chinese religion and mythology. Over time, this system became a visualization of a complex cosmology including the elaboration of a heavenly bureaucracy, somewhat parallel to the earthly bureaucracy of the Chinese state, and invoking the same sort of explicit hierarchy.

Siming's special concern (and power) is the balancing of yin and yang. Of particular relevance here is the relation between yin and yang balance and human health, and the importance to individual human health of such balance, as articulated in traditional Chinese medicine. Siming has the power to balance or unbalance yin and yang, and thus to lengthen or shorten human lifespans, or to provide health or prolong illness.

=== Three Deathbringers ===
An idea from Daoism/traditional Chinese medicine relates to the Siming. Also known as the sanshi (三尸; "Three Corpses") or sanchong (三蟲; "Three Worms"), the Three Deathbringers are part of a Daoist physiological belief that demonic creatures live inside the human body, and they seek to hasten the death of their hosts. These three supernatural parasites allegedly enter the person at birth, and reside in the three dantian "energy centers" (head, chest, and abdomen). Succeeding the demise of their human host, they become free of the body as malevolent "ghosts". However, this process is regulated by Siming, who may or may not permit this process: in this regard, Siming is said to rely on the reports which the Three Deathbringers (and perhaps Kitchen God) provide on specifically regulated dates. Based on these reports, and perhaps other information, Siming alters the fine yin-yang balance of each individual, thus regulating each one's health or sickness, and ultimately each's lifespan. Nevertheless, humans are believed to have various recourses available to alter the judgement of Siming regarding their fates, such as interfering with the reporting process, praying to Siming or his superiors, or following treatment from a doctor to improve the yin-yang balance, and thus extend the lifespan.

=== Zhuangzi and the skull ===
One of the early literary references to Siming as a deity is in a section of the book Zhuangzi, from about 300 BCE (莊子, 至樂: Zhuāngzǐ, Zhì lè).

One of the great literary figures of China, Zhou of the Zhuang family became known as Master Zhuang, Zhuangzi, to many subsequent generations. Living in about the 3rd century BCE, Zhuangzi's words and anecdotes have since become a central part of philosophy and culture around the globe. One anecdote, presumably relayed by the Master himself is that one day, while traveling down the road, he came upon a skull. After a prolonged and introspective session of speculation on what unhappy events had led to some unknown person's lack of proper burial, in such an inappropriate final resting spot: whose it had been and by what event the skull came to be lying here, abandoned by the wayside. Master Zhuang then became tired, and lay down to sleep, pillowing his head upon "Mr. Skull". In his sleep, the skull came and lectured the Master upon the great tranquillity and happiness experienced by the dead. Zhuangzi retorted that he could petition Siming to use his or her powers over Fate and Destiny to restore the skull to be again a living human being, and then he or she could return to both hometown and family. The skull emphatically denies any such desire, and ends the encounter by rhetorically asking why anyone in such a state of unassailable happiness as experienced by the dead would ever wish give this up in exchange for suffering the vicissitudes of the living?

== Astronomical Siming ==
Starmaps showing two Siming asterisms

In ancient times, astrology and astronomy were hardly distinguished. In China, on the one hand, there was the observation of phenomena in the sky, particularly trans-atmospheric phenomena: this observational study of experiential events became differentially known as Chinese astronomy. On the other hand, cerebral and emotional impulses lead to the development of a more philosophic, religious, and sometimes superstitious phenomenon known as Chinese astrology. It is worth emphasizing that the differentiation between the two is relatively modern. The astronomical asterisms of Siming (itself, actually part of asterism 虛, "Emptiness") consist of the Deified Judge of Life star group. Sīmìngyī: (24 Aquarii, 司命一) and Sīmìngèr (26 Aquarii, 司命二); that is, Siming One and Siming Two. Astrological considerations appear to have had some influence on the assignment of names.

=== Wenchang ===
Wenchang Wang (Chinese: 文昌王), also known as Wenchang Dijun (Chinese: 文昌帝君), or simply as Wen Qu, or Wen, is a Taoist god of Culture and Literature. Literally he is King (王) of Flourishing (昌) Culture/Language (文). Wenchang Wang is physically represented by a constellation of six stars near the Big Dipper. The stars traditional names are: Shangjiang (上將), Cijiang (次將), Guixiang (貴相), Siming (司命), Sizhong (司中), and Silu (司祿). Wenchang Wang is often depicted as an elderly scholar accompanied by two attendants, Tianlong (天聾 or Heaven-Deaf) and Diya (地啞 or Earth-Mute). Wenchang has historically been called upon by scholars and writers who need inspiration or help right before an exam, in especial, traditionally, the Imperial examination.

== Poetry ==
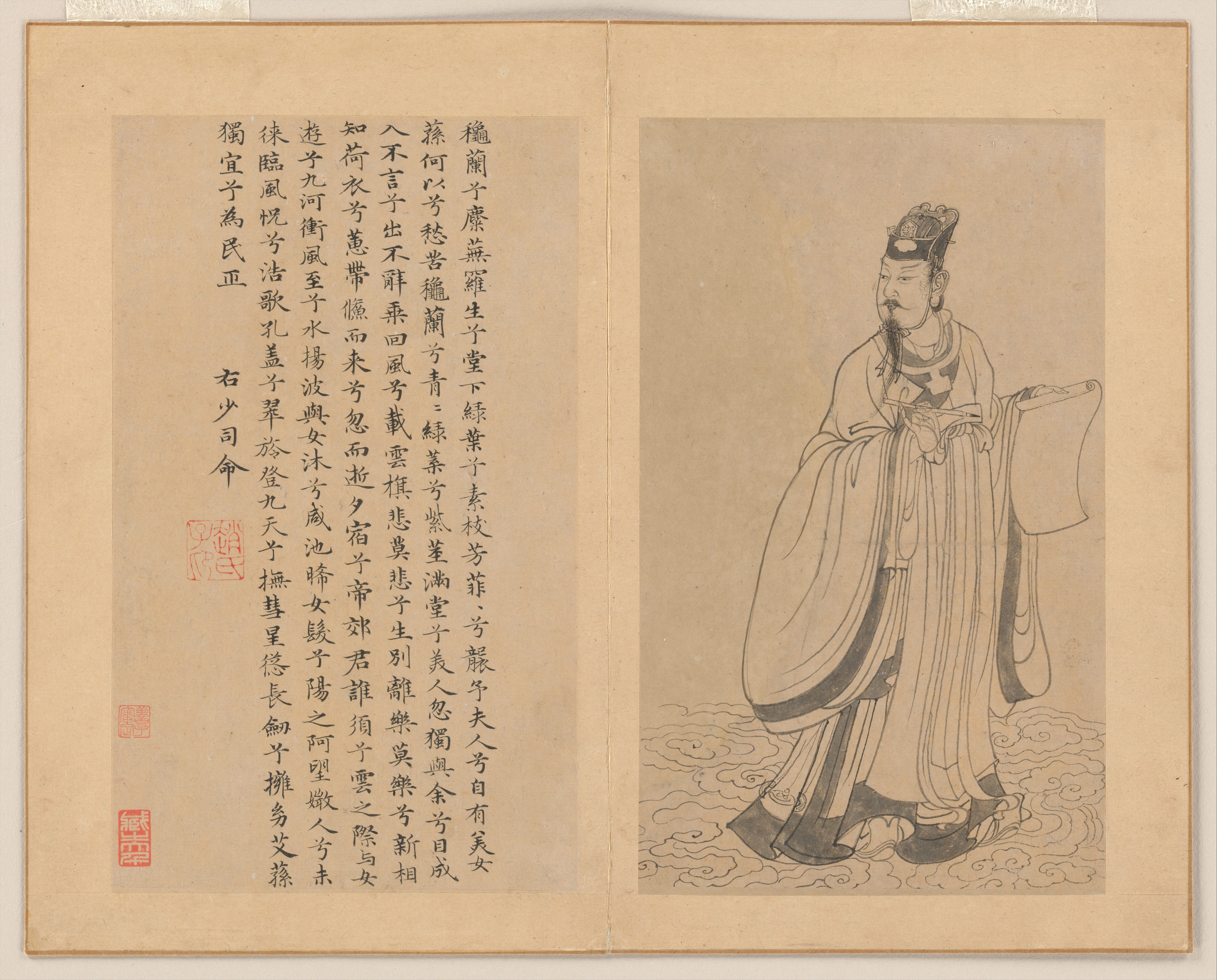
Illustrated version of the poem "Lesser Master of Fate", probably fourteenth century

The ancient poetry text Chu Ci features to Siming in two titles of the Jiu Ge: the so-called "Da Siming" (大司命,Greater Siming) and the "Shao Siming" (少司命,Lesser Siming). The Chuci poetry anthology (collected late BC - early BCE) has a section Nine Songs (Jiu Ge). Two of its poems are titled "Greater Master of Fate" and "Lesser Master of Fate". The "Greater" and "Lesser" may refer to two different Siming deities, two aspects of the same deity (such as Jin and Chu (state) shamanic cult versions, both of which were prominent at the time the poems were collected and both of which listed Siming as a god), the greater and lesser may refer to the length of the poems, have some seasonal connotation, or perhaps there is some other explanation.

== Pop culture ==
Two Siming are found in The Legend of Qin film. There are a Greater Siming (大司命), appearing as the Priestess of Death and a Lesser Siming (少司命) as Priestess of Birth.

== See also ==
- Culture of China
- Chinese spiritual world concepts
- Emptiness (Chinese constellation)
- List of supernatural beings in Chinese folklore
- Chinese mythology
- Religion in China
- Ghosts
- Shao Siming
