= Wu (shaman) =

Chinese shaman

Chinese name
- Chinese: 巫
Transcriptions
Standard Mandarin
- Hanyu Pinyin: wū
Hakka
- Romanization: mù
Yue: Cantonese
- Jyutping: mou4

Korean name
- Hangul: 무
Transcriptions
- Revised Romanization: Mu

Wu (Chinese: 巫; pinyin: wū; Wade–Giles: wu) is a Chinese term translating to "shaman" or "sorcerer", originally the practitioners of Chinese shamanism or "Wuism" (巫教 wū jiào).

== Terminology ==
The glyph ancestral to modern 巫 is first recorded in bronze script, where it could refer to shamans or sorcerers of either sex. Modern Mandarin wu (Cantonese mouh) continues a Middle Chinese mju or mjo. The Old Chinese reconstruction is uncertain, given as *m^{y}wo or as *m^{y}ag, (Note: Bernhard Karlgren), mjuo < *mjwaɣ (Zhou Fagao), *mjag (Li Fanggui), mju < *ma (Axel Schuessler).) the presence of a final velar -g or -ɣ in Old Chinese being uncertain.

By the late Zhou dynasty (4th to 3rd centuries BCE), wu referred mostly to female shamans or "sorceresses", while male sorcerers were named xi 覡 "male shaman; sorcerer", first attested in the Guoyu or Discourses of the States (4th century BCE). Other sex-differentiated shaman names include nanwu 男巫 for "male shaman; sorcerer; wizard"; and nüwu 女巫, wunü 巫女, wupo 巫婆, and wuyu 巫嫗 for "female shaman; sorceress; witch".

Wu is used in compounds like wugu 巫蠱 "sorcery; cast harmful spells", wushen 巫神 or shenwu 神巫 (with shen "spirit; god") "wizard; sorcerer", and wuxian 巫仙 (with xian "immortal; alchemist") "immortal shaman".

The word tongji 童乩 (lit. "youth diviner") "shaman; spirit-medium" is a near-synonym of wu. Chinese uses phonetic transliteration to distinguish native wu from "Siberian shaman": saman 薩滿 or saman 薩蠻. "Shaman" is occasionally written with Chinese Buddhist transcriptions of Shramana "wandering monk; ascetic": shamen 沙門, sangmen 桑門, or sangmen 喪門.

Joseph Needham suggests "shaman" was transliterated xianmen 羨門 in the name of Zou Yan's disciple Xianmen Gao 羨門高 (or Zigao 子高). He quotes the Shiji that Emperor Qin Shi Huang (r. 221–210 BCE), "wandered about on the shore of the eastern sea, and offered sacrifices to the famous mountains and the great rivers and the eight Spirits; and searched for xian "immortals", [xianmen], and the like." Needham compares two later Chinese terms for "shaman": shanman 珊蛮, which described the Jurchen leader Wanyan Xiyin, and sizhu 司祝, which was used for imperial Manchu shamans during the Qing dynasty.

=== Translations ===
Shaman is the common English translation of Chinese wu, but some scholars maintain that the Siberian shaman and Chinese wu were historically and culturally different shamanic traditions. Arthur Waley defines wu as "spirit-intermediary" and says, "Indeed the functions of the Chinese wu were so like those of Siberian and Tunguz shamans that it is convenient (as has indeed been done by Far Eastern and European writers) to use shaman as a translation of wu. In contrast, Schiffeler describes the "untranslatableness" of wu, and prefers using the romanization "wu instead of its contemporary English counterparts, "witches," "warlocks," or "shamans"," which have misleading connotations. Taking wu to mean "female shaman", Edward H. Schafer translates it as "shamaness" and "shamanka". The transliteration-translation "wu shaman" or "wu-shaman" implies "Chinese" specifically and "shamanism" generally. Wu, concludes von Falkenhausen, "may be rendered as "shaman" or, perhaps, less controversially as "spirit medium"." Paper criticizes "the majority of scholars" who use one word shaman to translate many Chinese terms (wu 巫, xi 覡, yi 毉, xian 仙, and zhu 祝), and writes, "The general tendency to refer to all ecstatic religious functionaries as shamans blurs functional differences."

The character 巫 wu besides the meanings of "spirit medium, shaman, witch doctor" (etc.) also has served as a toponym: Wushan 巫山 (near Chongqing in Sichuan Province), Wuxi 巫溪 "Wu Stream", Wuxia 巫峽 "Wu Gorge".

Wu is also a surname (in antiquity, the name of legendary Wu Xian 巫咸). Wuma 巫馬 (lit. "shaman horse") is both a Chinese compound surname (for example, the Confucian disciple Wuma Shi/Qi 巫馬施/期) and a name for "horse shaman; equine veterinarian" (for example, the Zhouli official).

=== Characters ===
The contemporary Chinese character 巫 for wu combines the graphic radicals gong 工 "work" and ren 人 "person" doubled (cf. cong 从). This 巫 character developed from Seal script characters that depicted dancing shamans, which descend from Bronzeware script and Oracle bone script characters that resembled a cross potent.

The first Chinese dictionary of characters, the (121 CE) Shuowen Jiezi defines wu as zhu 祝 "sacrifice; prayer master; invoker; priest" ("祝也 女能以舞降神者也 象从工 两人舞形") and analyzes the Seal graph, "An Invoker. A woman who can serve the Invisible, and by posturing bring down the spirits. Depicts a person with two sleeves posturing." This Seal graph for wu is interpreted as showing "the 工 work of two dancing figures set to each other – a shamanistic dance" or "two human figures facing some central object (possibly a pole, or in a tent-like enclosure?)".

This dictionary also includes a variant Great Seal script (called a guwen "ancient script") that elaborates wu 巫. Hopkins analyzes this guwen graph as gong 廾 "two hands held upward" at the bottom (like shi 筮's Seal graph) and two "mouths" with the "sleeves" on the sides; or "jade" because the Shuowen defines ling 靈 "spiritual; divine" as synonymous with wu and depicting 巫以玉事神, "an inspired shaman serving the Spirits with jade."

Schafer compares the Shang dynasty oracle graphs for wu and nong 弄 "play with; cause" (written with 玉 "jade" over 廾 "two hands") that shows "hands (of a shaman?) elevating a piece of jade (the rain-compelling mineral) inside an enclosure, possibly a tent. The Seal and modern form 巫 may well derive from this original, the hands becoming two figures, a convergence towards the dancer-type graph."

Tu Baikui 塗白奎 suggests that the wu oracle character "was composed of two pieces of jade and originally designated a tool of divination." Citing Li Xiaoding 李孝定 that gong 工 originally pictured a "carpenter's square", Allan argues that oracle inscriptions used wu 巫 interchangeably with fang 方 "square; side; place" for sacrifices to the sifang 四方 "four directions".

This 巫 component is semantically significant in several characters:

- wu 誣 (with the "speech radical" 言) "deceive; slander; falsely accuse"
- shi 筮 (with the "bamboo radical" 竹) "Achillea millefolium (used for divination)"
- xi 覡 (with the "vision radical" 見) "male shaman; male sorcerer"
- ling 靈 (with the "cloud radical" 雨 and three 口 "mouths" or "raindrops") "spirit; divine; clever"
- yi 毉 "doctor", which is an old "shaman" variant character for yi 醫 (with the "wine radical" 酉)

=== Etymology ===
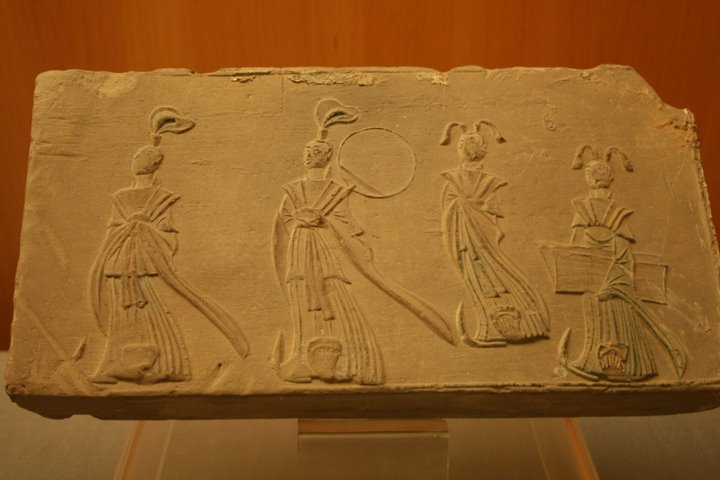
Han dynasty tomb-tile showing "long-sleeved dancers" and attendants.

A wide range of hypotheses for the etymology of wū "spirit medium; shaman" has been proposed.

Laufer proposed a relation between Mongolian bügä "shaman", Turkish bögü "shaman", "Chinese bu, wu (shaman), buk, puk (to divine), and Tibetan aba (pronounced ba, sorcerer)".

Coblin puts forward a Sino-Tibetan root *mjaɣ "magician; sorcerer" for Chinese wū < mju < *mjag 巫 "magician; shaman" and Written Tibetan 'ba'-po "sorcerer" and 'ba'-mo "sorcereress" (of the Bön religion).

Schuessler notes Chinese xian < sjän < *sen 仙 "transcendent; immortal; alchemist" was probably borrowed as Written Tibetan gšen "shaman" and Thai [mɔɔ] < Proto-Tai *hmɔ "doctor; sorcerer". In addition, the Mon–Khmer and Proto-Western-Austronesian *səmaŋ "shaman" may also be connected with wū. Schuessler lists four proposed etymologies:

Firstly, wū could be the same word as wū 誣 "to deceive". Schuessler notes a written Tibetan semantic parallel between "magical power" and "deceive": sprul-ba "to juggle, make phantoms; miraculous power" cognate with [pʰrul] "magical deception".

Secondly, wu could be cognate with wǔ 舞 "to dance". Based on analysis of ancient characters, Hopkins proposed that wū 巫 "shaman", wú 無 "not have; without", and wǔ 舞 "dance", "can all be traced back to one primitive figure of a man displaying by the gestures of his arms and legs the thaumaturgic powers of his inspired personality". Many Western Han dynasty tombs contained jade plaques or pottery images showing "long-sleeved dancers" performing at funerals, whom Erickson identifies as shamans, citing the Shuowen jiezi that early wǔ characters depicted a dancer's sleeves.

Thirdly, wū could also be cognate with mǔ 母 "mother" since wū, as opposed to xí 覡, were typically female. Edward Schafer associates wū shamanism with fertility rituals. (Note: "Linguistic facts reveal the intimate relationships between the word wu (*myu) "shamanka" and such words as "mother", "dance", "fertility", "egg", and "receptacle". The ancient shamanka, then, was closely related to the fecund mother, to the fertile soil, to the receptive earth. The textual evidence supports these philological associations. In Shang and Chou times, shamankas were regularly employed in the interests of human and natural fertility, above all in bringing rain to parched farmlands – a responsibility they shared with ancient kings. They were musicians and dancers and oracles.") Jensen cites the Japanese sinologist Shirakawa Shizuka 白川静's hypothesis that the mother of Confucius was a wū.

Drawing of the bronze script character wū (*mjag).

Fourthly, wū could be a loanword from Iranian *maguš "magus; magician" (cf. Old Persian maguš, Avestan mogu), meaning an "able one; specialist in ritual". Mair provides archaeological and linguistic evidence that Chinese wū < *m^{y}ag 巫 "shaman; witch, wizard; magician" was a loanword from Old Persian *maguš "magician; magus". Mair connects the bronze script character for wū 巫 with the "cross potent" symbol ☩ found in Neolithic West Asia, suggesting the loan of both the symbol and the word.

== Early records of wu ==
The oldest written records of wu are Shang dynasty oracle inscriptions and Zhou dynasty classical texts. Boileau notes the disparity of these sources.

Concerning the historical origin of the wu, we may ask: were they a remnant of an earlier stage of the development of archaic Chinese civilization? The present state of the documentation does not allow such a conclusion for two reasons: first, the most abundant data about the wu are to be found in Eastern Zhou texts; and, second, these texts have little in common with the data originating directly from the Shang civilization; possible ancestors of the Eastern Zhou wu are the cripples and the females burned in sacrifice to bring about rain. They are mentioned in the oracular inscriptions but there is no mention of the Shang character wu. Moreover, because of the scarcity of information, many of the activities of the Zhou wu cannot be traced back to the Shang period. Consequently, trying to correlate Zhou data with Neolithic cultures appears very difficult.

=== Wu in Shang oracular inscriptions ===
Shima lists 58 occurrences of the character wu in concordance of oracle inscriptions: 32 in repeated compounds (most commonly 巫帝 "wu spirit/sacrifice" and 氐巫 "bring the wu) and 26 in miscellaneous contexts. Boileau differentiates four meanings of these oracular wu:

1. "a spirit, wu of the north or east, to which sacrifices are offered"
2. "a sacrifice, possibly linked to controlling the wind or meteorology"
3. "an equivalent for shi 筮, a form of divination using achilea"
4. "a living human being, possibly the name of a person, tribe, place, or territory"

The inscriptions about this living wu, which is later identified as "shaman", reveal six characteristics:

1. whether the wu is a man or a woman is not known;
2. it could be either the name for a function or the name of a people (or an individual) coming from a definite territory or nation;
3. the wu seems to have been in charge of some divinations, (in one instance, divination is linked to a sacrifice of appeasement);
4. the wu is seen as offering a sacrifice of appeasement but the inscription and the fact that this kind of sacrifice was offered by other persons (the king included) suggests that the wu was not the person of choice to conduct all the sacrifices of appeasement;
5. there is only one inscription where a direct link between the king and the wu appears. Nevertheless, the nature of the link is not known, because the status of the wu does not appear clearly;
6. he follows (being brought, presumably, to Shang territory or court) the orders of other people; he is perhaps offered to the Shang as a tribute.

Based on this ancient but limited Shang-era oracular record, it is unclear how or whether the Wu spirit, sacrifice, person, and place were related.

=== Wu in Zhou received texts ===
Chinese wu 巫 "shaman" occurs over 300 times in the Chinese classics, which generally date from the late Zhou and early Han periods (6th-1st centuries BCE). The following examples are categorized by the common specializations of wu-shamans:

men and women possessed by spirits or gods, and consequently acting as seers and soothsayers, exorcists and physicians; invokers or conjurers bringing down gods at sacrifices, and performing other sacerdotal functions, occasionally indulging also in imprecation, and in sorcery with the help of spirits.

A single text can describe many roles for wu-shamans. For instance, the Guoyu idealizes their origins in a Golden Age. It contains a story about King Zhao of Chu (r. 515-489 BCE) reading in the Shujing that the sage ruler Shun "commissioned Chong and Li to cut the communication between heaven and earth". He asks his minister to explain and is told:

Anciently, men and spirits did not intermingle. At that time there were certain persons who were so perspicacious, single-minded, and reverential that their understanding enabled them to make meaningful collation of what lies above and below, and their insight to illumine what is distant and profound. Therefore the spirits would descend upon them. The possessors of such powers were, if men, called xi (shamans), and, if women, wu (shamanesses). It is they who supervised the positions of the spirits at the ceremonies, sacrificed to them, and otherwise handled religious matters. As a consequence, the spheres of the divine and the profane were kept distinct. The spirits sent down blessings on the people, and accepted from them their offerings. There were no natural calamities.

In the degenerate time of [Shaohao] (traditionally put at the twenty-sixth century B.C.), however, the Nine Li threw virtue into disorder. Men and spirits became intermingled, with each household indiscriminately performing for itself the religious observances which had hitherto been conducted by the shamans. As a consequence, men lost their reverence for the spirits, the spirits violated the rules of men, and natural calamities arose. Hence the successor of [Shaohao], [Zhuanxu] ..., charged [Chong], Governor of the South, to handle the affairs of heaven in order to determine the proper place of the spirits, and Li, Governor of Fire, to handle the affairs of Earth, in order to determine the proper place of men. And such is what is meant by cutting the communication between Heaven and Earth.

==== Wu-shamans as healers ====
The belief that demonic possession caused disease and sickness is well documented in many cultures, including ancient China. The early practitioners of Chinese medicine historically changed from wu 巫 "spirit-mediums; shamans" who used divination, exorcism, and prayer to yi 毉 or 醫 "doctors; physicians" who used herbal medicine, moxibustion, and acupuncture.

As mentioned above, wu 巫 "shaman" was depicted in the ancient 毉 variant character for yi 醫 "healer; doctor". This archaic yi 毉, writes Carr, "ideographically depicted a shaman-doctor in the act of exorcistical healing with (矢 'arrows' in) a 医 'quiver', a 殳 'hand holding a lance', and a wu 巫 'shaman'." Unschuld believes this 毉 character depicts the type of wu practitioner described in the Liji.

Several times a year, and also during certain special occasions, such as the funeral of a prince, hordes of exorcists would race shrieking through the city streets, enter the courtyards and homes, thrusting their spears into the air, in an attempt to expel the evil creatures. Prisoners were dismembered outside all gates to the city, to serve both as a deterrent to the demons and as an indication of their fate should they be captured.

Replacing the exorcistical 巫 "shaman" in 毉 with medicinal 酒 "wine" in yi 醫 "healer; doctor" signified, writes Schiffeler, "the practice of medicine was not any longer confined to the incantations of the wu, but that it had been taken over (from an official standpoint) by the "priest-physicians," who administered elixirs or wines as treatments for their patients."

Hexagram 32, Heng 恆

Wu and yi are compounded in the word wuyi 巫醫 "shaman-doctor; shamans and doctors", translated "exorcising physician", "sorcerer-physician", or "physician-shaman". Confucius quotes a "Southern Saying" that a good wuyi must have heng 恆 "constancy; ancient tradition; continuation; perseverance; regularity; proper name (e.g., Yijing Hexagram 32)". The (ca. 5th century BCE) Lunyu "Confucian Analects" and the (ca. 1st century BCE) Liji "Record of Rites" give different versions of the Southern Saying.

First, the Lunyu quotes Confucius to mention the saying and refer to the Heng Hexagram:

The Master said, The men of the south have a saying, Without stability a man will not even make a good shaman or witch-doctor. Well said! Of the maxim; if you do not stabilize an act of te 德, you will get evil by it (instead of good), the Master said, They (i.e. soothsayers) do not simply read the omens.

Confucius refers to a Yijing line interpretation of the Heng "Duration" Hexagram: "Nine in the third place means: He who does not give duration to his character meets with disgrace." In Waley's earlier article about the Yijing, he translated "If you do not stabilize your "virtue," Disgrace will overtake you", and quoted the Lunyu.

"The people of the south have a saying, 'It takes heng to make even a soothsayer or medicine-man.' It's quite true. 'If you do not stabilize your virtue, disgrace will overtake you'." Confucius adds 不占而已矣, which has completely baffled his interpreters. Surely the meaning is 'It is not enough merely to get an omen,' one must also heng 'stabilize it'. And if such a rule applies even to inferior arts like those of the diviner and medicine-man, Confucius asks, how much the more does it apply to the seeker after [de] in the moral sense? Surely he too must 'make constant' his initial striving!

Second, the Liji quotes Confucius to elaborate upon the Southern Saying.

The Master said, 'The people of the south have a saying that "A man without constancy cannot be a diviner either with the tortoise-shell or the stalks." This was probably a saying handed down from antiquity. If such a man cannot know the tortoise-shell and stalks, how much less can he know other men? It is said in the Book of Poetry (II, v, ode 1, 3) "Our tortoise-shells are wearied out, And will not tell us anything about the plans." The Charge to [Yue] says ([Shujing], IV, VIII, sect. 2, 5, 11), "Dignities should not be conferred on men of evil practices. (If they be), how can the people set themselves to correct their ways? If this be sought merely by sacrifices, it will be disrespectful (to the spirits). When affairs come to be troublesome, there ensues disorder; when the spirits are served so, difficulties ensue." 'It is said in the [Yijing], "When one does not continuously maintain his virtue, some will impute it to him as a disgrace; (in the position indicated in the Hexagram.) 'When one does maintain his virtue continuously (in the other position indicated), this will be fortunate in a wife, but in a husband evil'."

This Liji version makes five changes from the Lunyu. (1) It writes bushi 卜筮 "diviner" instead of wuyi 巫醫 "shaman-doctor", compounding bu "divine by bone or shell, scapulimancy or plastromancy" and shi (also with "shaman") "divine by milfoil stalks, cleromancy or sortilege". (2) Instead of quoting Confucius to remark "well said!"; he describes the southern proverb as "probably a saying handed down from antiquity" and rhetorically questions the efficacy of divination. (3) The Liji correctly quotes the Shijing criticizing royal diviners: "Our tortoises are (satiated =) weary, they do not tell us the (proper) plans." (4) It quotes the "Charge to Yue" 說命 (traditionally attributed to Shang king Wu Ding) differently from the fabricated Guwen "Old Texts" Shujing "Classic of History" chapter with this name.

Dignities may not be conferred on man of evil practices, but only on men of worth. Anxious thought about what will be good should precede your movements. Your movements also should have respect to the time for them. ... Officiousness in sacrifices is called irreverence; ceremonies when burdensome lead to disorder. To serve the spirits in this way is difficult.

(5) It cites an additional Yijing Hexagram 32 line that gender determines the auspiciousness of heng. "Six in the fifth place means: Giving duration to one's character through perseverance. This is good fortune for a woman, misfortune for a man."

The mytho-geography Shanhaijing "Classic of Mountains and Seas" associates wu-shamans with medicinal herbs.

East of the Openbright there are Shaman Robust, Shaman Pushaway, Shaman Sunny, Shaman Shoe, Shaman Every, and Shaman Aide. They are all on each side of the corpse of Notch Flaw and they hold the neverdie drug to ward off decay.

There is Mount Divinepower. This is where Shaman Whole, Shaman Reach, Shaman Share, Shaman Robust, Shaman Motherinlaw, Shaman Real, Shaman Rite, Shaman Pushaway, ShamanTakeleave, and Shaman Birdnet ascend to the sky and come down from Mount Divinepower. This is where the hundred drugs are to be found.

"Shaman Whole" translates Wu Xian 巫咸 below.

Boileau contrasts Siberian and Chinese shamanic medicines.

Concerning healing, a comparison of the wu and the Siberian shaman shows a big difference: in Siberia, the shaman is also in charge of cures and healing, but he does this by identifying the spirit responsible for the disease and negotiates the proper way to appease him (or her), for example by offering a sacrifice or food on a regular basis. In archaic China, this role is performed through sacrifice: exorcism by the wu does not seem to result in a sacrifice but is aimed purely and simply at expelling the evil spirit.

==== Wu-shamans as rainmakers ====
Wu anciently served as intermediaries with nature spirits believed to control rainfall and flooding. During a drought, wu-shamans would perform the yu 雩 "sacrificial rain dance ceremony". If that failed, both wu and wang 尪 "cripple; lame person; emaciated person" engaged in "ritual exposure" rainmaking techniques based upon homeopathic or sympathetic magic. As Unschuld explains, "Shamans had to carry out an exhausting dance within a ring of fire until, sweating profusely, the falling drops of perspirations produced the desired rain." These wu and wang procedures were called pu 曝/暴 "expose to open air/sun", fen 焚 "burn; set on fire", and pulu 暴露 "reveal; lay bare; expose to open air/sun".

For the year 639 BCE, the Chunqiu records, "In summer, there was a great drought" in Lu, and the Zuozhuan notes a discussion about fen wu wang 焚巫尪:

The duke (Xi) wanted to burn a wu and a cripple at the stake. Zang Wenzhong 臧文仲 said: this is no preparation for the drought. Repair the city walls, limit your food, be economic in your consumption, be parsimonious and advise (people) to share (the food), this is what must be done. What use would be wu and cripple? If Heaven wanted to have them killed, why were they born at all? If they (the cripple and the wu) could produce drought, burning them would augment very much (the disaster).

The duke followed this advice, and subsequently "scarcity was not very great".

The Liji uses the words puwang 暴尪 and puwu 暴巫 to describe a similar rainmaking ritual during the reign (407-375 BCE) of Duke Mu 穆公 of Lu.

There was a drought during the year. Duke Mu called on Xianzi and asked him about the reason for this. He said: 'Heaven has not (given us) rain in a long time. I want to expose to the sun a cripple and what about that?' (Xianzi) said: 'Heaven has not (given us) rain in a long time but to expose to the sun the crippled son of somebody, that would be cruel. No, this cannot be allowed.' (the duke said): 'Well, then I want to expose to the sun a wu and what about that?' (Xianzi) answered: 'Heaven has not (given us) rain in a long time but to put one's hope on an ignorant woman and offer her to pray (for rain), no, this is too far (from reason).'

Commentators interpret the wu as a female shaman and the wang as a male cripple.

De Groot connects the Zuozhuan and Liji stories about ritually burning wu.

These two narratives evidently are different readings of one, and may both be inventions; nevertheless they have their value as sketches of ancient idea and custom. Those 'infirm or unsound' wang were non-descript individuals, evidently placed somewhat on a line with the wu; perhaps they were queer hags or beldams, deformed beings, idiotic or crazy, or nervously affected to a very high degree, whose strange demeanour was ascribed to possession.

==== Wu-shamans as oneiromancers ====
Oneiromancy or dream interpretation was one type of divination performed by wu 巫. The Zuozhuan records two stories about wu interpreting the guilty dreams of murderers.

First, in 581 BCE the lord of Jin, who had slain two officers from the Zhao (趙) family, had a nightmare about their ancestral spirit, and called upon an unnamed wu "shaman" from Sangtian 桑田 and a yi "doctor" named Huan 緩 from Qin.

The marquis of [Jin] saw in a dream a great demon with disheveled hair reaching to the ground, which beat its breast, and leaped up, saying: "You have slain my descendants unrighteously, and I have presented my request to the High God in consequence." It then broke the great gate (of the palace), advanced to the gate of the State chamber, and entered. The duke was afraid and went into a side-chamber, the door of which it also broke. The duke then awoke, and called the witch of [Sangtian], who told him everything which he had dreamt. "What will be the issue?" asked the duke. "You will not taste the new wheat," she replied.

After this, the duke became very ill, and asked the services of a physician from [Qin], the earl of which sent the physician [Huan] to do what he could for him. Before he came, the duke dreamt that his disease turned into two boys, who said, "That is a skilful physician; it is to be feared he will hurt us; how shall we get out of his way?" Then one of them said: "If we take our place above the heart and below the throat, what can he do to us?" When the physician arrived, he said, "Nothing can be done for this disease. Its seat is above the heart and below the throat. If I assail it (with medicine), it will be of no use; if I attempt to puncture it, it cannot be reached. Nothing can be done for it." The duke said, "He is a skilful physician", gave him large gifts, and send him back to [Qin].

In the sixth month, on the day [bingwu], the marquis wished to taste the new wheat, and made the superintendent of his fields present some. While the baker was getting it ready, [the marquis] called the witch of [Sangtian], showed her the wheat and put her to death. As the marquis was about to taste the wheat, he felt it necessary to go to the privy, into which he fell, and so died. One of the servants that waited on him had dreamt in the morning that he carried the marquis on his back up to heaven. The same at mid-day carried him on his back out from the privy, and was afterwards buried alive with him. (Note: In this quote, "witch" is a translation of wu.)

Commentators have attempted to explain why the wu merely interpreted the duke's dream but did not perform a healing ritual or exorcism, and why the duke waited until the prediction had failed before ordering the execution. Boileau suggests the wu was executed in presumed responsibility for the Zhao ancestral spirit's attack.

Second, in 552 BCE a wu named Gao 皋 both appears in and divines about a dream of Zhongxing Xianzi. After conspiring in the murder of Duke Li of Jin, Zhongxing dreams that the duke's spirit gets revenge.

In autumn, the marquis of [Jin] invaded our northern border. [Zhongxing Xianzi] prepared to invade [Qi]. (Just then), he dreamt that he was maintaining a suit with duke [Li], in which the case was going against him, when the duke struck him with a [ge] on his head, which fell down before him. He took his head up, put it on his shoulders, and ran off, when he saw the wizard [Gao] of [Gengyang]. A day or two after, it happened that he did see this [Gao] on the road, and told him his dream, and the wizard, who had had the same dream, said to him: "Your death is to happen about this time; but if you have business in the east, you will there be successful [first]". Xianzi accepted this interpretation. (Note: In this quote, "wizard" is a translation of wu.)

Boileau questions:

why wasn't the wu asked by Zhongxin to expel the spirit of the duke? Perhaps because the spirit went through him to curse the officer. Could it be that the wu was involved (his involvement is extremely strong in this affair) in a kind of deal, or is it simply that the wu was aware of two different matters concerning the officer, only one connected to the dream?

According to these two stories, wu were feared and considered dangerous. This attitude is also evident in a Zhuangzi story about the shenwu 神巫 "spirit/god shaman" Jixian 季咸 from Zheng.

In [Zheng], there was a shaman of the gods named [Jixian]. He could tell whether men would live or die, survive or perish, be fortunate or unfortunate, live a long time or die young, and he would predict the year, month, week, and day as though he were a god himself. When the people of [Zheng] saw him, they all ran out of his way.

"As soothsayers." writes de Groot, "the wu in ancient China no doubt held a place of great importance."

==== Wu-shamans as officials ====
Sinological controversies have arisen over the political importance of wu 巫 in ancient China. Some scholars believe Chinese wu used "techniques of ecstasy" like shamans elsewhere; others believe wu were "ritual bureaucrats" or "moral metaphysicians" who did not engage in shamanistic practices.

Chen Mengjia wrote a seminal article that proposed Shang kings were wu-shamans.

In the oracle bone inscriptions are often encountered inscriptions stating that the king divined or that the king inquired in connections with wind- or rain-storms, rituals, conquests, or hunts. There are also statements that "the king made the prognostication that ...," pertaining to weather, the border regions, or misfortunes and diseases; the only prognosticator ever recorded in the oracle bone inscriptions was the king ... There are, in addition, inscriptions describing the king dancing to pray for rain and the king prognosticating about a dream. All of these were activities of both king and shaman, which means in effect that the king was a shaman.

Chen's shaman-king hypothesis was supported by Kwang-chih Chang who cited the Guoyu story about Shao Hao severing heaven-earth communication (above).

This myth is the most important textual reference to shamanism in ancient China, and it provides the crucial clue to understanding the central role of shamanism in ancient Chinese politics. Heaven is where all the wisdom of human affairs lies. ... Access to that wisdom was, of course, requisite for political authority. In the past, everybody had had that access through the shamans. Since heaven had been severed from earth, only those who controlled that access had the wisdom – hence the authority – to rule. Shamans, therefore, were a crucial part of every state court; in fact, scholars of ancient China agree that the king himself was actually head shaman.

Some modern scholars disagree. For instance, Boileau calls Chen's hypothesis "somewhat antiquated being based more on an a priori approach than on history" and says,

In the case of the relationship between wu and wang [king], Chen Mengjia did not pay sufficient attention to what the king was able to do as a king, that is to say, to the parts of the king's activities in which the wu was not involved, for example, political leadership as such, or warfare. The process of recognition must also be taken into account: it is probable that the wu was chosen or acknowledged as such according to different criteria to those adopted for the king. Chen's concept of the king as the head wu was influenced by Frazer's theories about the origin of political power: for Frazer the king was originally a powerful sorcerer.

The Shujing "Classic of History" lists Wu Xian 巫咸 and Wu Xian 巫賢 as capable administrators of the Shang royal household. The Duke of Zhou tells Prince Shao 召 that:

I have heard that of ancient time, when King Tang had received the favoring decree, he had with him Yi Yin, making his virtue like that of great Heaven. Tai Jia, again, had Bao Heng. Tai Wu had Yi Zhi and Chen Hu, through whom his virtue was made to affect God; he had also [巫咸] Wu Xian, who regulated the royal house; Zu Yi had [巫賢] Wu Xian. Wu Ding had Gan Pan. These ministers carried out their principles and effected their arrangements, preserving and regulating the empire of [Shang], so that, while its ceremonies lasted, those sovereigns, though deceased, were assessors to Heaven, while it extended over many years. (Note: Names in this quote have been standardized to pinyin.)

According to Boileau,

In some texts, Wu Xian senior is described as being in charge of the divination using [shi 筮] achilea. He was apparently made a high god in the kingdom of Qin 秦 during the Warring States period. The Tang subcommentary interprets the character wu of Wu Xian father and son as being a cognomen, the name of the clan from which the two Xian came. It is possible that in fact the text referred to two Shang ministers, father and son, coming from the same eponymous territory wu. Perhaps, later, the name (wu 巫) of these two ministers has been confused with the character wu (巫) as employed in other received texts.

Wu-shamans participated in court scandals and dynastic rivalries under Emperor Wu of Han (r. 141-87 BCE), particularly regarding the crime of wugu 巫蠱 (with gu "venom-based poison") "sorcery; casting harmful spells". In 130 BCE, Empress Chen Jiao was convicted of using shamans from Yue to conduct wugu magic. She "was dismissed from her position and a total of 300 persons who were involved in the case were executed", their heads were cut off and exposed on stakes. In 91 BCE, an attempted coup against crown prince Liu Ju involved accusations of practicing wugu, and subsequently "no less than nine long months of bloody terrorism, ending in a tremendous slaughter, cost some tens of thousands their lives!".

Ever since Emperor Wu of Han established Confucianism as the state religion, the ruling classes have shown increasing prejudice against shamanism. Some modern writers view the traditional Confucianist disdain for female shamans as sexism. Schafer wrote:

In the opinion of the writer, the Chou ruling class was particularly hostile to women in government, and regarded the ancient fertility rites as impure. This anti-female tendency was even more marked in the state of Lu, where Confucius approved of the official rain-ceremony in which men alone participated. There was, within ancient China, a heterogeneity of culture areas, with female shamans favored in some, males in others. The "licentiousness" of the ceremonies of such a state as Cheng (doubtless preserving the ancient Shang traditions and customs) was a byword among Confucian moralists. Confucius' state seems on the other hand to have taken the "respectable" attitude that the sexes should not mingle in the dance, and that men were the legitimate performers of the fertility rites. The general practice of the later Chou period, or at least the semi-idealized picture given of the rites of that time in such books as the Chou li, apparently prescribed a division of magical functions between men and women. The former generally play the role of exorcists, the latter of petitioners. This is probably related to the metaphysical belief that women, embodying the principle yin, were akin to the spirits, whereas men, exemplifying the element yang, were naturally hostile to them.

Accepting the tradition that Chinese shamans were women (i.e., wu 巫 "shamaness" as opposed to xi 覡 "shaman"), Kagan believes:

One of the main themes in Chinese history is the unsuccessful attempt by the male Confucian orthodoxy to strip women of their public and sacred powers and to limit them to a role of service ... Confucianists reasserted daily their claim to power and authority through the promotion of the phallic ancestor cult which denied women religious representation and excluded them from the governmental examination system which was the path to office, prestige, and status.

In addition, Unschuld refers to a "Confucian medicine" based upon systematic correspondences and the idea that illnesses are caused by excesses (rather than demons).

The Zhouli provides detailed information about the roles of wu-shamans. It lists, "Spirit Mediums as officials on the payroll of the Zhou Ministry of Rites (Liguan 禮官, or Ministry of Spring, Chun guan 春官)." This text differentiates three offices: the Siwu 司巫 "Manager/Director of Shamans", Nanwu 男巫 "Male Shamans", and Nüwu 女巫 "Female Shamans".

The managerial Siwu, who was of Shi 士 "Gentleman; Yeoman" feudal rank, yet was not a wu, supervised "the many wu".

The Managers of the Spirit Mediums are in charge of the policies and orders issued to the many Spirit Mediums. When the country suffers a great drought, they lead the Spirit Mediums in dancing the rain-making ritual (yu 雩). When the country suffers a great calamity, they lead the Spirit Mediums in enacting the long-standing practices of Spirit Mediums (wuheng 巫恆). At official sacrifices, they [handle] the ancestral tablets in their receptacles, the cloth on which the spirits walk, and the box containing the reeds [for presenting the sacrificial foodstuffs]. In all official sacrificial services, they guard the place where the offerings are buried. In all funerary services, they are in charge of the rituals by which the Spirit Mediums make [the spirits] descend (jiang 降).

The Nanwu and Nüwu have different shamanic specializations, especially regarding inauspicious events like sickness, death, and natural disaster.

The Male Spirit Mediums are in charge of the si 祀 and yan 衍 Sacrifices to the Deities of the Mountains and Rivers. They receive the honorific titles [of the deities], which they proclaim into the [four] directions, holding reeds. In the winter, in the great temple hall, they offer [or: shoot arrows] without a fixed direction and without counting the number. In the spring, they make proclamations and issue bans so as to remove sickness and disease. When the king offers condolence, they together with the invocators precede him.
The Female Mediums are in charge of anointing and ablutions at the exorcisms that are held at regular times throughout the year. When there is a drought or scorching heat, they dance in the rain-making ritual (yu). When the queen offers condolence, they together with the invocators precede her. In all great calamities of the state, they pray, singing and wailing. (part 26)

Von Falkenhausen concludes:

If we are to generalize from the above enumeration, we find that the Spirit Mediums' principal functions are tied up with averting evil and pollution. They are especially active under circumstances of inauspiciousness and distress. In case of droughts and calamities, they directly address the supernatural powers of Heaven and Earth. Moreover, they are experts in dealing with frightful, dangerous ghosts (the ghosts of the defunct at the time of the funeral, the evil spirits at the exorcism, and the spirits of disease) and harmful substances (unburied dead bodies during visits of condolence and all manner of impure things at the lustration festival).

=== Chu Ci ===
The poetry anthology Chu Ci, especially its older pieces, is largely characterized by its shamanic content and style, as explicated to some extent by sinologist David Hawkes: passim). Among other points of interest are the intersection of Shamanic traditions and mythology/folk religion in the earlier textual material, such as Tianwen (possibly based on even more ancient shamanic temple murals), the whole question of the interpretation of the 11 verses of the Jiu Ge (Nine Songs) as the libretto of a shamanic dramatic performance, the motif of shamanic spirit flight from Li Sao through subsequent pieces, the evidence of possible regional variations in wu shamanism between Chu, Wei, Qi, and other states (or shamanic colleges associated with those regions), and the suggestion that some of the newer textual material was modified to please Han Wudi, by Liu An, the Prince of Huainan, or his circle. The Chu Ci contents have traditionally been chronologically divided into an older, pre-Han dynasty group, and those written during the Han dynasty. Of the traditionally-considered to be the older works (omitting the mostly prose narratives, "Bu Ju" and "Yu Fu") David Hawkes considers the following sections to be "functional, explicitly shamanistic": Jiu Ge, Tian Wen, and the two shamanic summons for the soul, "The Great Summons" and "Summons of the Soul". Regarding the other, older pieces he considers that "shamanism, if there is any" to be an incidental poetic device, particularly in the form of descriptions of the shamanic spirit journey.

==== Background ====
The mainstream of Chinese literacy and literature is associated with the shell and bone oracular inscriptions from recovered archeological artifacts from the Shang dynasty and with the literary works of the Western Zhou dynasty, which include the classic Confucian works. Both are associated with the northern Chinese areas. South of the traditional Shang and Zhou areas was the land (and water) of Chu. Politically and to some extent culturally distinct from the Zhou dynasty and its later 6 devolved hegemonic states, Chu was the original source and inspiration for the poems anthologized during the Han dynasty under the title Chu Ci, literally meaning something like "the literary material of Chu". Despite the tendency of Confucian-oriented government officials to suppress wu shamanic beliefs and practice, in the general area of Chinese culture, the force of colonial conservatism and the poetic voice of Qu Yuan and other poets combined to contribute an established literary tradition heavily influenced by wu shamanism to posterity. Shamanic practices as described anthropologically are generally paralleled by descriptions of wu practices as found in the Chu Ci, and in Chinese mythology more generally.

==== Li Sao, Yuan You, and Jiu Bian ====
The signature poem of the Chu Ci is the poem Li Sao. By China's "first poet", Qu Yuan, a major literary device of the poem is the shamanic spirit journey. "Yuan You", literally "The Far-off Journey" features shamanic spirit flight as a literary device, as does Jiu Bian, as part of its climactic ending. In the Li Sao, two individual shamans are specified, Ling Fen (靈氛) and Wu Xian (巫咸). This Wu Xian may or may not be the same as the (one or more) historical person(s) named Wu Xian. Hawkes suggests an equation of the word ling in the Chu dialect with the word wu.

==== Questioning Heaven ====
The Heavenly Questions (literally "Questioning Heaven") is one of the ancient repositories of Chinese myth and a major cultural legacy. Propounded as a series of questions, the poem provides insight and provokes questions about the role of wu shaman practitioners in society and history.

==== Jiu Ge ====
The Jiu Ge may be read as the lyrical preservation of a shamanic dramatic performance. Apparently typical of at least one variety of shamanism of the Chu area of the Yangzi River basin, the text exhibits a marked degree of eroticism in connection with shamanic invocations.

==== Summoning the soul ====
Summoning the soul (hun) of the possibly dead was a feature of ancient culture. The 2 Chu Ci pieces of this type may be authentic transcriptions of such a process.

==== Individual wu shaman ====
Various individual wu shaman are alluded to in the Chu Ci. In some cases the binomial nomenclature is unclear, referring perhaps to one or two persons; for example, in the case of Peng Xian, who appears likely to represent Wu Peng and Wu Xian, which is a common type of morphological construction in Classical Chinese poetry. David Hawkes refers to some wu shaman as "Shaman Ancestors". Additionally, the distinction between humans and transcendent divinities tends not to be explicit in the received Chu Ci text. In some cases, the individual wu shaman are known from other sources, such as the Shanhaijing (Classic of Mountains and Seas). The name of some individual shaman includes "Wu" (巫) in the normal position of the family surname, for example, in the case of Wu Yang (巫陽, "Shaman Bright"). Wu Yang is the major speaker in Zhao Hun/Summons for the Soul. He also appears in Shanhaijing together with Wu Peng (巫彭): 6 wu shaman are depicted together reviving a corpse, with Wu Peng holding the Herb of Immortality.

In the Li Sao, two individual shaman are specified: Ling Fen (靈氛) and Wu Xian (巫咸). This Wu Xian may or may not be the same as the (one or more) historical person(s) named Wu Xian. Hawkes suggests an equation of the word ling in the Chu dialect with the word wu.

In Shanhaijing (Classic of Mountains and Seas), the name of some individual shaman includes "Wu" (巫) in the normal position of the family surname, for example, in the case of the following list, where the 6 are depicted together reviving a corpse, with Wu Peng holding the Herb of Immortality. Wu Peng and Wu Yang and others are also known from the Chu Ci poetry anthology. Wu Yang is the major speaker in Zhao Hun (also known as Summons for the Soul). From Hawkes:

- The six shamans receiving a corpse: Wu Yang (巫陽, "Shaman Bright"), Wu Peng (巫彭), Wu Di (巫抵), Wu Li (巫履) [Tang reconstruction *Lǐ, Hanyu Pinyin Lǚ], Wu Fan (巫凡), Wu Xiang (巫相)
- Ten other individuals named Wu in Shanhaijing: Wu Xian (巫咸), Wu Ji (巫即), Wu Fen (or Ban) (巫肦), Wu Peng (巫彭), Wu Gu (巫姑), Wu Zhen (巫真), Wu Li (巫禮), Wu Di (巫抵), Wu Xie (巫謝), Wu Luo (巫羅).

== Modern Chinese folk religion ==
Aspects of Chinese folk religion are sometimes associated with "shamanism". De Groot provided descriptions and pictures of hereditary shamans in Fujian, called saigong (pinyin shigong) 師公. Paper analyzed tongji mediumistic activities in the Taiwanese village of Bao'an 保安.

Shamanistic practices of Tungusic peoples are also found in China. Most notably, the Manchu Qing dynasty introduced Tungusic shamanistic practice as part of their official cult (see Shamanism in the Qing dynasty). Other remnants of Tungusic shamanism are found within the territory of the People's Republic of China. documented Chuonnasuan (1927–2000), the last shaman of the Oroqen in northeast China.

== See also ==
- Chinese shamanism
- Chinese folk religion
- Shamanism in the Qing dynasty
- Chu Ci
- Han Wudi
- Jiu Ge
- Mudang
- Miko
- Xu Fu
- Yubu
