= Zhang Wo =

Chinese painter

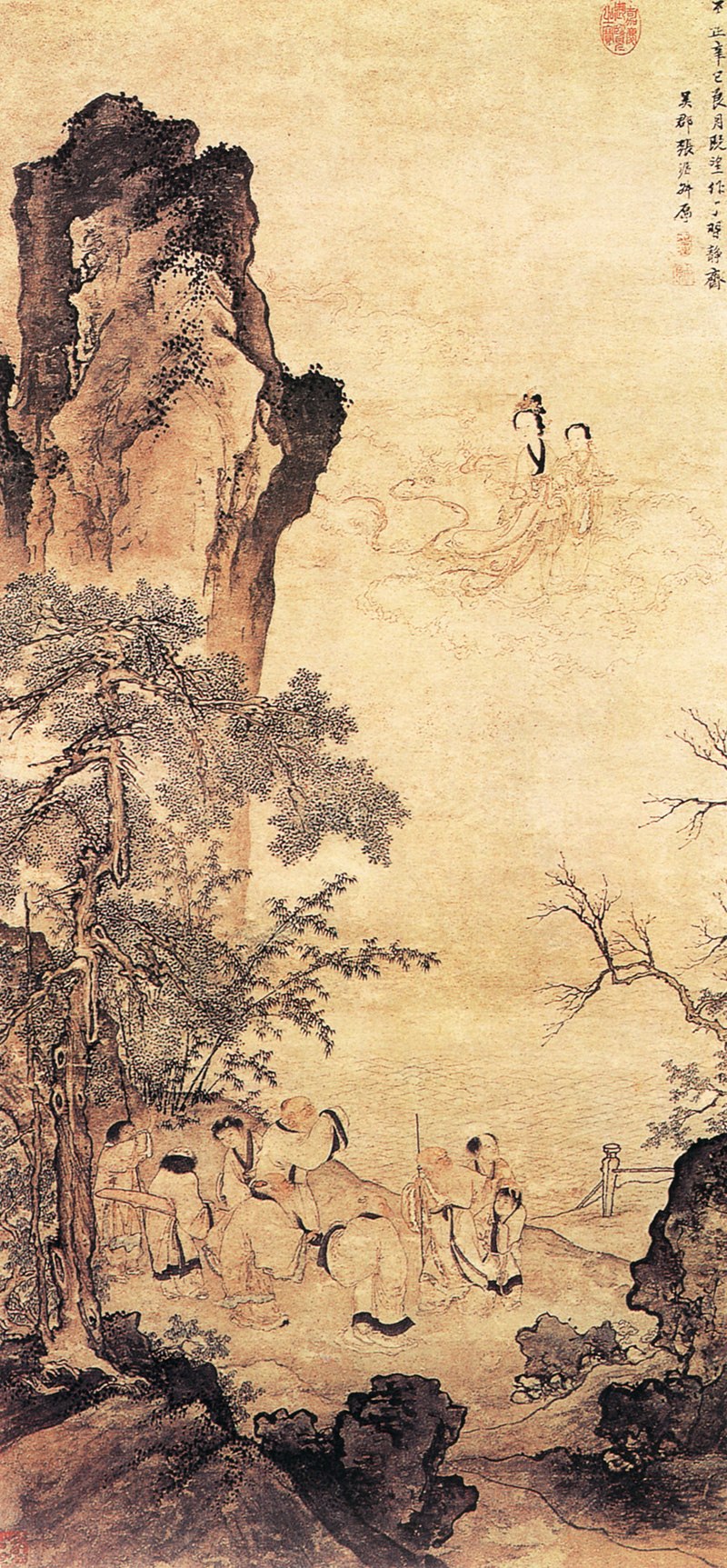
Celebration in Jade Pool (瑶池仙庆图), Zhang Wo, National Palace Museum, Taipei

Zhang Wo (or Zhang Wu, Chinese: 張渥), courtesy name as Shuhou, sobriquet as Zhenqisheng and Jianghaike, is a famed Chinese painter who was active during the Yuan Dynasty. Both his birth and death dates are unknown.

Zhang was born in Hangzhou in the Zhejiang province. His style name was 'Zhong Chun' and his sobriquet was 'Mi Gong'. Zhang's painting followed the fluent and pure style of Li Gonglin. Zhang specialized in painting human figures.
