= Li Gonglin =

Chinese Song Dynasty artist and politician

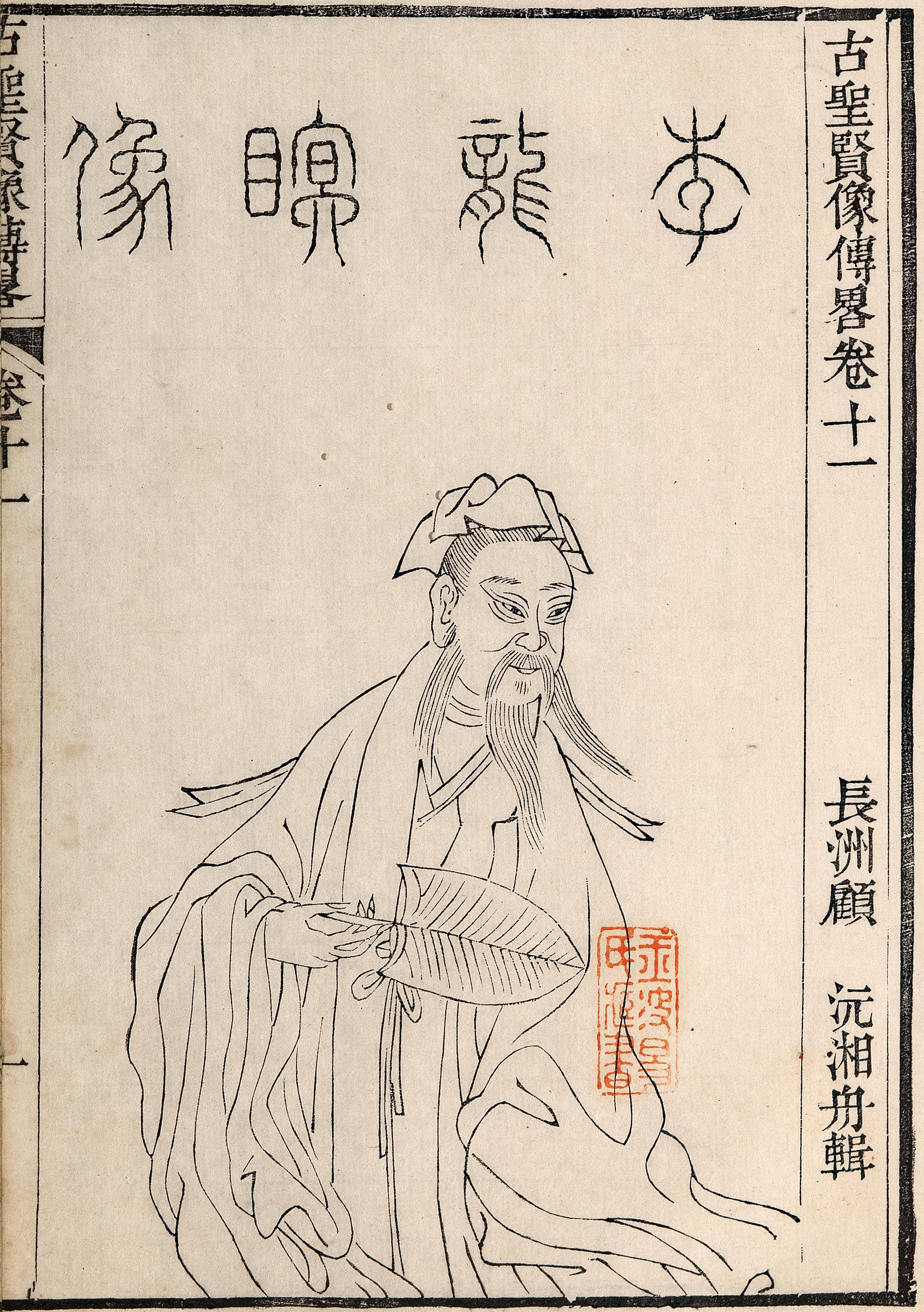
Li Gonglin

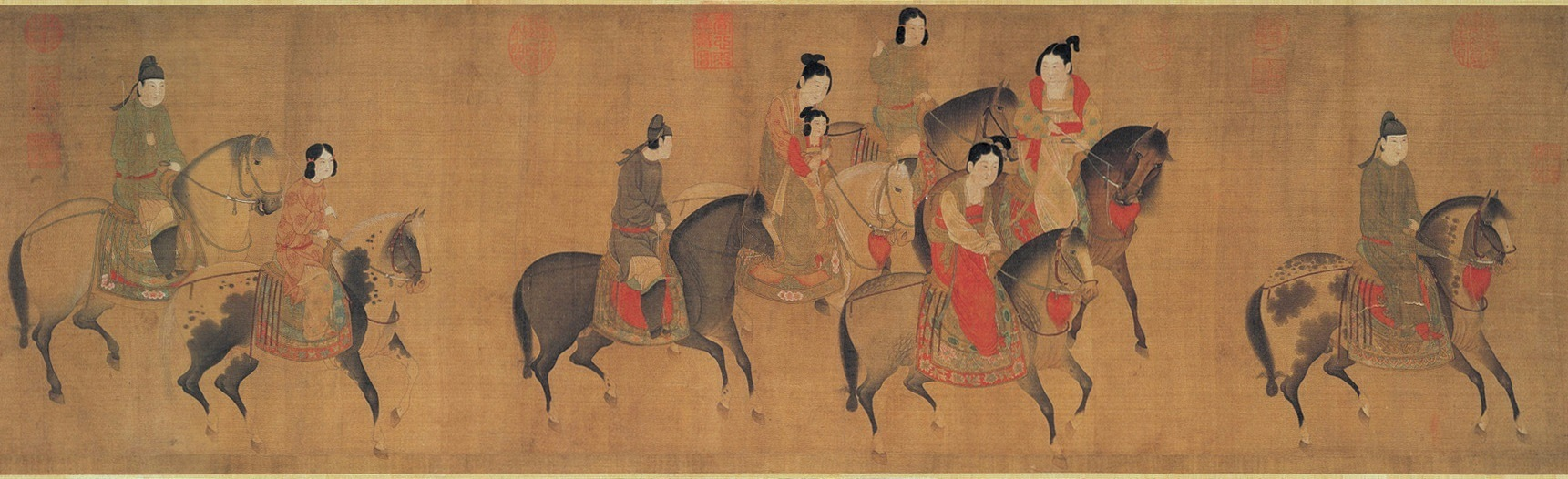
A painting of court ladies on horseback, a 12th-century remake by Li Gonglin after an 8th-century original by Zhang Xuan.

Li Gonglin (李公麟, 1049–1106), style name Boshi (伯時), art name Longmian Jushi (龍眠居士, Householder of the Sleeping Dragon), was a Chinese antiquarian, painter, and politician during the Northern Song dynasty.

== Biography ==
Born into a scholarly home near what is modern day Lu'an, Li Gonglin passed the highest level of civil service examinations at 21 and became a civil officer. He moved to serve at the capital of Kaifeng, a common path at the time. It was there that he became increasingly familiar with the literary figures of the day, both collecting and copying their works.

== Art ==
He became famous for his paintings of horses, then he turned to Buddhism and Taoism religious painting, as well as portrait and landscape painting. His painting style was attributed to the style of Gu Kaizhi and Wu Daozi. He made antiquarian contributions in the areas of copperware and Jade Seal dated between the Xia dynasty and the Zhou dynasty. Li published influential catalogues on his collections. The catalogues, of which none survive, featured a line drawing of each artefact, the philological origin of any inscriptions, and a discussion of the function of the artefact based on his interpretation of received texts. Li's work lay the foundation of Song antiquarian nomenclature and use interpretation of ancient bronze vessels. For example, his use of the term taotie based on 3rd and 4th century BCE scripture for a mask like decoration on bronze vessels, became standard vocabulary for the description of bronze vessels and is still used by scholars today.

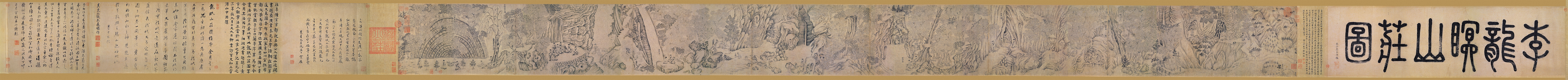
Li Gonglin, Mountain Villa, copy in the National Palace Museum, Taipei
