= 26 Aquarii =

Star in the constellation Aquarius

Observation data Epoch J2000.0 Equinox J2000.0 (ICRS)
- Constellation: Aquarius
- Right ascension: 21^{h} 42^{m} 10.11292^{s}
- Declination: +01° 17′ 06.9019″
- Apparent magnitude (V): 5.66

Characteristics
- Spectral type: K2(III)
- B−V color index: 1.446±0.008

Astrometry
Radial velocity (R_{v})	+8.15±0.19 km/s
Proper motion (μ)	RA: −4.298 mas/yr Dec.: −7.530 mas/yr
Parallax (π)	3.4044±0.1310 mas
Distance	960 ± 40 ly (290 ± 10 pc)
Absolute magnitude (M_{V})	−1.98

Details
Radius	54.5+3.5 −3.00 R_{☉}
Luminosity	842±38 L_{☉}
Surface gravity (log g)	1.2 cgs
Temperature	4,210+121 −129 K
Rotational velocity (v sin i)	3.2 km/s

Other designations
- 26 Aqr, BD+00°4770, GC 30377, HD 206445, HIP 107144, HR 8287, SAO 126997

Database references
SIMBAD	data

26 Aquarii is a single star located approximately 960 light years away from the Sun in the zodiac constellation of Aquarius. 26 Aquarii is the Flamsteed designation. It is visible to the naked eye as a dim, orange-hued star with an apparent visual magnitude of 5.66. This object is moving away from the Earth with a heliocentric radial velocity of +8 km/s.

Houk and Swift (1999) listed a stellar classification of K2(III) for 26 Aquarii, corresponding to an evolved K-type giant of uncertain luminosity class. Bartkevicius and Lazauskaite (1997) found spectral traits of MD-Ba?-K3 II–III, K2 Ia, suggesting some type of giant K-type star with a suspected metal deficiency (MD) of barium. It has 54.5 times the Sun's radius and is radiating 842 times the luminosity of the Sun from its photosphere at an effective temperature of 4,210 K.
