= 24 Aquarii =

Star in the constellation Aquarius

Observation data Epoch J2000 Equinox ICRS
- Constellation: Aquarius
- Right ascension: 21^{h} 39^{m} 31.53468^{s}
- Declination: −00° 03′ 04.1095″
- Apparent magnitude (V): 6.66 (7.08 + 15.11 + 7.90)

Characteristics
- Evolutionary stage: main sequence
- Spectral type: F5.5V + M5V + F8V
- U−B color index: +0.04 +0.005 (Aa) +1.13 (Ab) +0.15 (B)
- B−V color index: +0.514 +0.459 (Aa) +1.701 (Ab) +0.642 (B)

Astrometry
Radial velocity (R_{v})	−15.86±0.06 km/s
Proper motion (μ)	RA: +215.367 mas/yr Dec.: +17.077 mas/yr
Parallax (π)	22.63±0.25 mas
Distance	144 ± 2 ly (44.2 ± 0.5 pc)
Absolute magnitude (M_{V})	3.45

Orbit
Primary	24 Aqr A
Name	24 Aqr B
Period (P)	48.98±0.07 yr
Semi-major axis (a)	0.4250±0.0005″
Eccentricity (e)	0.8610±0.0002
Inclination (i)	55.00±0.04°
Longitude of the node (Ω)	140.26±0.05°
Periastron epoch (T)	2020.799±0.003
Argument of periastron (ω) (secondary)	293.95±0.07°

Orbit
Primary	24 Aqr Aa
Name	24 Aqr Ab
Period (P)	5.883933(15) days
Semi-major axis (a)	0.0706±0.0019 AU
Eccentricity (e)	0.071±0.006
Inclination (i)	55.8±2.9°
Periastron epoch (T)	46,988.58±0.08 MJD
Argument of periastron (ω) (secondary)	286±5°
Semi-amplitude (K_{1}) (primary)	14.60±0.09 km/s

Details

24 Aqr Aa
Mass	1.12±0.06 M_{☉}
Radius	1.23±0.04 R_{☉}
Luminosity	2.4±0.1 L_{☉}
Surface gravity (log g)	4.40±0.06 cgs
Temperature	6,483±80 K
Metallicity [Fe/H]	–0.09 dex
Age	3.612 Gyr

24 Aqr Ab
Mass	0.24±0.05 M_{☉}
Radius	0.28±0.04 R_{☉}
Surface gravity (log g)	4.80±0.06 cgs
Age	3.612 Gyr

24 Aqr B
Mass	1.06±0.05 M_{☉}
Radius	1.02±0.04 R_{☉}
Luminosity	1.33±0.05 L_{☉}
Surface gravity (log g)	4.47±0.06 cgs
Temperature	6,150±80 K
Age	3.612 Gyr

Other designations
- 24 Aqr, BD−00°4245, HD 206058, HIP 106942, SAO 145566, WDS J21395-0003, LTT 8626

Database references
SIMBAD	data

24 Aquarii is a triple star system in the equatorial constellation of Aquarius. 24 Aquarii is the Flamsteed designation. The apparent magnitude of this system is 6.66, which, according to the Bortle Dark-Sky Scale, means it is a faint star that is just visible to the naked eye from dark, rural skies. Based on a dynamical parallax measurement, the system is located at a distance of 144 light-years (44 parsecs). The system is moving closer to the Earth with a heliocentric radial velocity of −16 km/s.

The components A and B make up a visual binary with an orbital period of 48.98 years and a high eccentricity of 0.8610. Both are main sequence stars with spectral types of F5.5V and F8V, respectively. Component A is itself a single-lined spectroscopic binary with a period of 5.8839 days and an eccentricity of 0.071±0.006, being orbited by a faint red dwarf with a spectral type of M5V.
