= Alû =

Demonic character in Sumerian mythology

In Akkadian and Sumerian mythology, Alû is a vengeful spirit of the Utukku that goes down to the underworld Kur. The demon has no mouth, lips or ears. It would roam at night and terrify people while they sleep and the Alû may also torment their victims for fun. It was also said that possession by the Alû would result in unconsciousness or a coma; in this manner it resembles creatures such as the mara, and incubus, which are invoked to explain sleep paralysis. In Akkadian and Sumerian mythology, it is associated with other demons such as the Gallu and the Lilu.

== In ancient texts ==
Stephen Herbert Langdon (1864) cites a translation of a cuneiform script by Major-General Sir H. C. Rawlinson. From v Pl. 50, A, line 42:

Whom in his bed the wicked Alû covered,
Whom the wicked ghost by night overwhelmed.

Langdon (364) stated that Alû is androgynous and "attacks a man's breast".

The following passage quoted by Langdon shows the modus operandi of the Utukku:

The wicked Utukku who slays man alive on the plain.

The wicked Alû who covers (man) like a garment.
The wicked Etimmu, the wicked Gallû, who bind the body.
The Lamme (Lamashtu), the Lammea (Labasu), who cause disease in the body.
The Lilû who wanders in the plain.
They have come nigh unto a suffering man on the outside.
They have brought about a painful malady in his body.
The curse of evil has come into his body.
An evil goblin they have placed in his body.
An evil bane has come into his body.
Evil poison they have placed in his body.
An evil malediction has come into his parts.
Evil and trouble they have placed in his body.
Poison and taint have come into his body.
They have produced evil.
Evil being, evil face, evil mouth, evil tongue.
Sorcery, venom, slaver, wicked machinations,
Which are produced in the body of the sick man.

O woe for the sick man whom thy cause to moan like a šąharrat.

--(Langdon, 357, 362, 364)

== Contemporary cultural influence ==
- Alû is Monster in My Pocket #113
- Alu-demon in Dungeons & Dragons
- Alu is a demon in FAITH: Chapter III
