= Spirit spouse =

Aspect of shamanism

The spirit spouse is a widespread element of shamanism, distributed through all continents and at all cultural levels. Often, these spirit husbands/wives are seen as the primary helping spirits of the shaman, who assist them in their work, and help them gain power in the world of spirit. The relationships shamans have with their spirit spouses may be expressed in romantic, sexual, or purely symbolic ways, and may include gender transformation as a part of correctly pairing with their "spouse". Shamans report engaging with their spirit spouses through dreams, trance, and other ritual elements. In some cultures, gaining a spirit spouse is a necessary and expected part of initiation into becoming a shaman. Examples of spirit spouses may be seen in non-shamanic cultures as well, including dreams about Jesus Christ by nuns, who are considered to be "brides of Christ".

== Particular instances ==
=== Africa ===
Ewe of Togo: variant in Haiti (Vodou) – "Wedding ceremonies between Vodou divinities and their devotees take place ... It is also believed that there is sexuality between the conjugal pair, by way of dreams."

Baule of Côte d'Ivoire: "Baule statuary is dominated by elaborate figures carved to symbolize "spirit spouses". Baule mythology dictates that every adult, male or female, has such a spouse, manifested through dreams." Each woman has a blolo bian ("spirit-husband"), and each man has a blolo bla ("spirit-wife"): these may be encountered in dreams; "Every Baule man and woman living in the world has in the blɔlɔ a "spirit spouse". Women have a blɔlɔ bian ... and men have a blɔlɔ bla ... This dream partner is always described as very beautiful". These spirit spouses are said to be in opposition to every man or woman's terrestrial husband or wife. The term that a man's wife would use to describe her relationship to his spirit spouse would translate into other languages as rival. The spirit spouses of the Baule can appear to their wife or husband in dreams and can take many forms but are never the form of their terrestrial spouse. Figurines representing them can be made for particular reasons, for example infertility or another crisis of a sexual nature . The blolo is able to give "good luck" however if the spirit spouse does not help with the problems of the natural world then the character of the spirit may be called into question and the figure of them may be discarded.

Among the varied tribes of southern Nigeria such as the Yoruba and the Igbo, Spirit Spouses of the Sea are common features of life due to the geographical closeness of their cultures to the Atlantic Ocean, though attitudes to their supposed existence depend largely on the religious inclinations of the individuals concerned. For example, a Yoruba traditionalist might look at a conjugal visit from a dream-based lover in much the same way as the aforementioned Ewe and Baule do, whereas a Muslim or Christian tribesman in the same situation would most likely look at it as a grave misfortune and seek the mystic aid of a spiritual counsellor to rectify what he would see as a probably dangerous connection to an otherworldly demon.

=== Asia ===
Yakshini of India.

China – "King Xiang (Hsiang; third century BCE) is said to have dreamt of a tryst with a goddess on Wu Shan (Witch's Mountain), with the goddess seizing the initiative." In another translation, "Witch's Mountain" is "Shamanka Mountain". This goddess of Wu Shan "transformed into the fungus-like yaocao 媱草", the "edible mushroom" being a metaphor in courtship for marriage.

Goldi of Siberia, along Sea of Japan: A male shaman may have in dreams a divine wife as ayami ("spirit-helper").

Yukaghir of Siberia, along upper Kolyma River: The goddess of hunting is "a lustful young woman whom hunters must persuade to provide them with prey animals by seducing her in their dreams."

Yakut of Siberia: The daughters of the abassy ("deities"), "in appearing to the shaman in his dream, ... enter into sexual intercourse with him." Thereby she imparts to him "luck".

Nganasan of Siberia: A woman in a shamanist family married the smallpox-spirit: she "became a wife of the Smallpox in her dream."

Buryat of Siberia: In shamanic dreams, "The soul of a Buryat novice travels to the center of the world, where it meets, in an amorous encounter, the nine wives of Tekha, the god of ... dance. Eventually, the soul meets there his future celestial spouse."

Mesopotamia: Hemerologies reveal that an ardat lilī-demoness or lilû-demon could pick a young man or woman respectively as their mate, (hâru), resulting in poor health. The lilu class of demons (later becoming associated during the 20th century with Lilith of Jewish mythology) appeared to their victims in dreams and were held responsible for illnesses such as epilepsy and syphilis. Here the spirit spouse concept was used not as a feature of shamanic healing, but offered as a disease etiology with corresponding shamanic cure.

=== Europe ===
In Christian literature, there are demons called incubus and succubus, who are also called types of spirit spouses. They are specifically referred to as spirit husband and spirit wife, respectively. In the work of St. Augustine it was stated that "many have verified it by their own experience and trustworthy persons have corroborated the experiences others told, that sylvans and fauns, commonly called incubi, have often wicked assaults upon women." These creatures are considered as spirit spouses, who only exist in dreams having intercourse with the dreamer. Some sources state that they are acquired through sexual promiscuity and are prominently connected with witchcraft spells, love potions, and lust.

In France, there is a belief that "during the night, in dreams, which he contrives to excite, he takes care to be the principal object of her ideas...'tis her sylph that causes her those pleasing reveries". "Humans long to mate with sylphs, according to the Comte de Gabalis, because they want to live forever".

=== Oceania ===
Sandwich Islands – "ʻaumakua could ... have sex with living persons during the night. These spirit mates ... could be of help".

Kaluli on the northern slope of Mt. Bosavi in Papua – "Mediums are men who have married spirit women in a dream". "The medium is always a man who is married (in a dream) to a woman of the invisible world. When he has a child by her, he is able to go to sleep, leave his body, and walk about in the mama world."

Kodi of Sumba Island in southern Indonesia – A man "dreamed that he had an encounter with two wild spirits who lived in the forest ... The wild spirit takes the form of a seductive woman, asking for ... sexual favors in return for the magical powers she controls." A generation later, this man's son "was seduced by the wild spirit woman he saw and entered into a "spirit marriage" (ole marapu)" with her, she becoming "his "spirit wife" (ariwyei marapu)".

=== South America ===
In South America, the shaman is a dominant figure. The type of shamanism practiced in this region has similarities with those of ethnic groups residing in Siberia and these include the process of initiation. In both of these societies, the process included marriage to a spirit spouse. For instance, Barbara Tedlock's anthropological fieldwork with the K'iche' diviners in Momostenango, Guatemala revealed they "are recruited in a classical shamanic fashion, including divine election—through ... dreams—and the process involves a marriage to a spirit spouse." In addition, the "male elders who decide on community leadership roles all possess female personal icons (bara) which commonly manifest themselves in dreams as women." "Quichés openly talk about the bara as a spouse". "Quichés are open and expressive in talking about and playing with their bara, or metaphoric 'spouses,' kissing, fondling, opening, and caressing them".

Events that highlight the role of the spirit spouse include the Andean people's Tinku Festival, held in the first week of May. This Andean religious event celebrates Pachamama, a goddess considered to be the Mother Earth. The festivity includes a ceremonial ritual, wherein participants shed blood as sacrifice and offering to the goddess in order to acquire blessing and guarantee a plentiful harvest. Shamans troop to the Tinku Festival to search for their spirit spouse.

In Mapuche, in Chile – "human-like wekufe include Punkure and Punfüta, nocturnal ... spouses ... in their dreams".

== Contrast against opposite-gender spirit-mediumship ==
The practice of dream-based spirit-marriage would appear to exclude and be excluded by (i.e., not be practiced by the same practitioners, nor perhaps even ever known in the same ethnic culture, as) the practice of opposite-gender spirit-possession mediumship. The latter practice (of opposite-gender spirit-possession mediumship) is attested in, e.g., Okinawa, Siam, and Burma, in each of which areas it would appear to be mainly (if not entirely) based on non-remembered (putatively non-conscious) trance.

The practice of dream-based spirit-marriage would appear likewise to exclude and be excluded by shallower trances involving some partial degree of control (but permanently and continuously, instead of merely intermittently as was the case in non-remembered trance) of the practitioner by a spirit-entity of opposite gender from that of the practitioner; which is attested not only among the berdache in tribes of the Great Plains of North America, but also among the manang in Borneo, and perhaps also among numerous other persons and geographic regions (including European practitioners of homosexual magic, etc.).

=== Asia ===
Thai – For a male spirit-medium, "female spirits possess the medium on Saturdays"; for which occasions the male medium is attired in feminine garments—these are events of spirit-possession by the medium's "losing consciousness". However, dreaming is not significant for T'ai spirit-mediumship. (There is, nevertheless, some degree of similarity between this practice of becoming possessed by an opposite-gender spirit regularly on a particular day of the week; and the custom in Haitian spirit-marriage of regularly devoting a particular day of the week to one's marital duty to that spirit.)

== See also ==
- Divine marriage
- Incubus
- Mystical marriage
- Sex magic
- Succubus
- Posthumous marriage
- Fictosexuality

== Bibliography ==
- Barbara Tedlock (ed.): Dreaming: Anthropological and Psychological Interpretations. Cambridge University Press, 1987.
- Rosalind C. Morris: In the Place of Origins: Modernity and Its Mediums in Northern Thailand. Duke University Press, Durham (NC), 2000.
