= Labasu =

Mesopotamian disease demon

Labasu (Labāṣu; Sumerian: ᵈdìm.me.A, ᵈkamad-duru₅) is a Mesopotamian demon of disease, that belongs to the DÌM/kamad group of demons, along with Lamashtu and Ahhazu. Although the name Labasu sounds Akkadian, it does not have a convincing Akkadian etymology.

== Mesopotamian Sources ==
=== Sumerian and Akkadian Literature ===
==== Disease ====
Labasu is associated with disease, specifically biphasic fevers without jaundice, such as rat-bite fever. Labasu has no personality profile outside of Lamashtu, and frequently appears alongside her in incantations. The demon Ahhazu is blamed for biphasic fevers with jaundice.

==== Relationship with Spirits ====
In Sumerian and bilingual texts, DÌM.ME (Lamashtu) was the leading demoness of a triad that consisted of ᵈdìm.me.A and ᵈdìm.me.ḪAB, the names of whom share the element DÌM.ME/Kamad.me with hers. In Akkadian versions of these texts, ᵈdìm.me.A becomes known as Labasu, and ᵈdìm.me.ḪAB as Ahhazu.

==== Astrology ====
LBAT 1597 is an astral-medical text, which mentions diseases that are ascribed to celestial influences. The text includes Lamashtu, Labasu and Ahhazu.

If (the moon is) in the region of Leo, lamaštu, labašu, and ahhazu-demons, the seized-by-lamaštu(-disease), seized by lamaštu day-and-night(-disease), the god is a lion related to a belligerent god, Ištar, and Hand of the Ghost-disease, (in the region of) Venus and Leo.

=== Magical Corpus ===
Labasu appears alongside Lamashtu and Ahhazu in the magical corpus, before the triad lilu, lilitu and ardat-lili. On some occasions, only the pair of Lamashtu and Labasu occurs.

==== Anti-Witchcraft Corpus ====
Texts of Group Eight: CEREMONIAL RITUALS FOR UNDOING WITCHCRAFT

Ghosts, Demons and Witches

109 Lamaštu, the labāṣu-demon, [the aḫḫāzu-demon], 207 or Lamaštu, or the labāṣu-demon, or the aḫ[ḫāzu-demon],

A collection of Anti-Witchcraft Rites Closely Related to Maqlû

33 [An evil rābiṣu-demon you have caused to seize me. May an evil rābiṣu-demon seize you!] [Lamaštu, the lab]āṣu-demon (and) the 34 [aḫḫāzu-demon you have caused to seize me]. May [Lamaštu, the labāṣu-demon (and) the aḫḫāz]u-demon seize you!

A parallel to Maqlû II 52-58

13" or Lamaštu, o[r the labāṣu-demon], 14" or the aḫḫ[āzu-demon], [or the lilû-demon, or the lilītu-demon, or]

==== Maqlû ====
Tablet I

135 Incantation. I am raising the torch and burning their statues,

136 (Those) of the utukku-demon, the šēdu-spirit, the lurker-demon, the ghost,

137 Lamaštu, labāṣu (disease), ahhāzu-jaundice

Tablet II

55 Be it Lamaštu, be it labāṣu (disease), be it ahhāzu-jaundice,

56 Be it lilû, be it lilītu, be it ardat-lilî,

61 Be it Hand-of-a-ghost-disease, be it Hand-[of-a-curse]-disease,

62 Be it Hand-of-mankind-disease, be it young Lamaštu, the daughter of Anu

Tablet V

66 Lamaštu, labāṣu (disease), (and) aḫḫāzu-jaundice you have caused to seize me: May Lamaštu, labāṣu (disease), (and) aḫḫāzu-jaundice seize you.

==== Utukkū Lemnūtu (Udug-Hul) ====
The Akkadian Utukku Lemnutu (meaning: evil demons; Sumerian Udug-Hul) are a series of incantation used to treat illnesses caused by demons. Labasu appears in those incantations, along with Lamashtu and Ahhazu, or sometimes (tablet 3, line 34; tablet 5, line 89; tablet 7) as a pair with Lamashtu alone.

The tablets that include Labasu are the following:

- 2 (line 64)
- 3 (34, 139)
- 4 (69, 150)
- 5 (21, 89)
- 6 (47, 59)
- 7 (3, 22)
- 9 (85)
- 10 (15, 30, 58)
- 11 (3)
- 12 (100)
- 13-15 (178, 223)
- 16 (169)

==== Incantations ====
TIM 9, 63

A portion of TIM 9, 63 (17′–23′), a Sumerian incantation of the Old Babylonian period, survived into the Standard Babylonian Lamashtu incantations. The rest of the tablet seems to be spells against Lamashtu, that also include Labasu.

When you cast the incantation of Eridu,

The evil udug, evil ala, evil ghost, evil galla,

Lamaštu, Labaṣu,

Evil man, evil eye, evil mouth, evil tongue -

Then they [all] shall stand aside!

Then the good udug and good lama shall stand (as guardians).

Then it shall be adjured by the heavens, it shall be adjured by the earth.

== See also ==
- Lamashtu
- Ahhazu
- Ardat-lilî
- Lilu
- Udug
