= Ahhazu =

Mesopotamian jaundice demon

Ahhazu (Aḫḫāzu, Ahhāzu, Akhkhazu; Sumerian: ᵈdìm.me.ḪAB, ᵈDÌM.ME.LAGAB, ᵈkamad-NIGIN, ᵈdìm(-me)-niĝin, aš-ru, dù-dù) is a Mesopotamian demon of jaundice, and belongs to the DÌM/kamad group of demons, along with Lamashtu and Labasu. Her name translates to "seizer" or "The Habitual Grabber".

Ahhazu comes from aḫāzu, "to take, marry, acquire; learn".

== Mesopotamian Sources ==
=== Sumerian and Akkadian Literature ===
==== Disease ====
Ahhazu was thought to be responsible for biphasic fevers presenting with jaundice, associated with alterations in mental status, skull fractures accompanied by fever, abnormal posturing, and even liver injuries. Ahhazu is not the sole cause of fever or jaundice; the demon Labasu appears to be fever without jaundice, while amurriqanu appears to mean "jaundice and bloating or wasting". The afflictions of ahhazu are sometimes called "hand of aḫḫāzu".

==== Relationship with Spirits ====
In Sumerian and bilingual texts, the goddess Lamashtu/DÌM.ME (Kamadme) was the leader of a demonic triad, along with ᵈdìm.me.A and ᵈdìm.me.ḪAB (their names share the element DÌM.ME/Kamad.me). In the Akkadian versions of the texts, ᵈdìm.me.A became known as Labasu, and ᵈdìm.me.ḪAB as Ahhazu.

==== Astrology ====
LBAT 1597, an astral-medical text, mentions diseases which are ascribed to celestial influences.

If (the moon is) in the region of Leo, lamaštu, labašu, and ahhazu-demons, the seized-by-lamaštu(-disease), seized by lamaštu day-and-night(-disease), the god is a lion related to a belligerent god, Ištar, and Hand of the Ghost-disease, (in the region of) Venus and Leo.

=== Magical Corpus ===
Ahhazu appears in the Babylonian magical corpus, usually along with Lamashtu and Labasu, sometimes before the triad lilu, lilitu, ardat-lilî.

==== Anti-Witchcraft Corpus ====
Texts of Group Eight: CEREMONIAL RITUALS FOR UNDOING WITCHCRAFT

Ghosts, Demons and Witches

109 Lamaštu, the labāṣu-demon, [the aḫḫāzu-demon] 207 or Lamaštu, or the labāṣu-demon, or the aḫ[ḫāzu-demon]

A collection of Anti-Witchcraft Rites Closely Related to Maqlû

33 [An evil rābiṣu-demon you have caused to seize me. May an evil rābiṣu-demon seize you!] [Lamaštu, the lab]āṣu-demon (and) the 34 [aḫḫāzu-demon you have caused to seize me]. May [Lamaštu, the labāṣu-demon (and) the aḫḫāz]u-demon seize you!

A parallel to Maqlû II 52-58

13" or Lamaštu, o[r the labāṣu-demon], 14" or the aḫḫ[āzu-demon], [or the lilû-demon, or the lilītu-demon, or]

==== Maqlû ====
Tablet I

135 Incantation. I am raising the torch and burning their statues,

136 (Those) of the utukku-demon, the šēdu-spirit, the lurker-demon, the ghost,

137 Lamaštu, labāṣu (disease), ahhāzu-jaundice

Tablet II

55 Be it Lamaštu, be it labāṣu (disease), be it ahhāzu-jaundice,

56 Be it lilû, be it lilītu, be it ardat-lilî,

61 Be it Hand-of-a-ghost-disease, be it Hand-[of-a-curse]-disease,

62 Be it Hand-of-mankind-disease, be it young Lamaštu, the daughter of Anu

Tablet V

66 Lamaštu, labāṣu (disease), (and) aḫḫāzu-jaundice you have caused to seize me: May Lamaštu, labāṣu (disease), (and) aḫḫāzu-jaundice seize you.

==== Utukkū Lemnūtu (Udug-Hul) ====
The Utukku Lemnutu (Sumerian: Udug-Hul) incantations were used to treat patients from illnesses caused by evil demons (which is also the translation of the title). Ahhazu is mentioned across the tablets, alongside Lamashtu and Labasu, translated as jaundice-demon(s) (in Tablet 11 she's translated as grabber).

The tablets that mention ahhazu/the jaundice-demons are:

- 2 (line 64)
- 3 (139)
- 4 (69, 150)
- 5 (21)
- 6 (48, 59)
- 9 (89)
- 10 (16, 31, 59)
- 11 (3)
- 12 (100)
- 13-15 (178, 223)
- 16 (169)

== See also ==
- Lamashtu
- Labasu
- Ardat-lilî
- Lilu
- Udug
