= Ḫulbazizi =

Sumerian exorcism

Ḫulbazizi, inscribed in cuneiform phonetically Ḫul.ba.zi.zi, “the Evil is Eradicated” or more literally "Evil (be) gone", is an ancient Mesopotamian exorcistic incantation series extant in earlier Sumerian and later Akkadian forms, the language switch taking place in the late Bronze Age, directed at every sort of evil (mimma lemnu), including a spell (ša malṭi eršiya, see below) against everything scary that hides below one's bed at night, depicted on an amulet with the terrified subject seated upright on his bed while a small dragon emerges from beneath to be confronted by a third figure.

== The text ==
The title by which the series is now known comes from the rubric on the last line, which may only actually refer to a couple of the preceding incantations rather than the composition as a whole. The final incantation in the collection entreats the planet Jupiter, the Pleiades and the deity Irragal (another name for Nergal) to deflect evil from the subject. The title appears on line seven of one of the manuscripts of the Exorcists Manual, the only one legible at this point. The opening incipit of the series begins Sil_{7}-lá ^{lú}érim-ma.

Two Ḫulbazizi incantations appear on Kassite seals depicting the fish-sage apkallu and its incantations were frequently invoked on amulets and charms, decorated with suitable apotropaic illustrations such as that of Ugallu, the lion-headed demon, during the Neo-Assyrian period:

He who transgressed the privacy of my bed, made me shrink for fear, and gave me frightening dreams: on the command of Ninurta, the first son, the beloved son, and on the command of Marduk, who lives in the E-sagil in Babylon, he must be handed over to Bedu, the chief gatekeeper of the Netherworld. You, door and door bolt, you must know: (from now on) I fall under the protection of these two divine lords.

— ša malṭi eršiya incantation

Some of its incantations were later to be sampled in the Muššu'u, "rubbing", compendium.

=== Primary publication ===
- Irving L. Finkel (1976). Ḫul.Ba.Zi.Zi: Ancient Mesopotamian Exorcistic Incantations (dissertation). Birmingham.

== See also ==
- Ancient Mesopotamian religion
- Asag/Asakku
- Gallu
- Utukku
