= The Four Winds (Mesopotamian) =

Mesopotamian demon

The Four Winds are a group of mythical figures in Mesopotamian mythology whose names and functions correspond to four cardinal directions of wind. They were both cardinal concepts (used for mapping and understanding geographical features in relation to each other) as well as characters with personality, who could serve as antagonistic forces or helpful assistants in myths.

== Functions and iconography ==
The concept of the Four Winds originated in Sumer, before 3000 BCE. While older theories posited that the ancient Mesopotamians had a concept of cardinality similar to modern day with a North, East, South, and West, it was more likely that their directions were framed around these four "principle winds". The Akkadian word for cardinality is equivalent to the word for wind. J. Neumann names these winds as "The regular wind" (NW), "The mountain wind" (NE), "The cloud wind" (SE), and "The Amorite Wind" (SW). These wind directions could be used to establish the presence of astrological bodies, orient maps, and direct the layout of cities and home construction, keeping buildings open to wind blowing in and alleviating the heat. These winds, aside from being used for cardinality, were also figures important to mythology and general culture in Mesopotamia.

As figures, the four winds have been identified with four winged beings on cylinder seals. Three are male (the NE, NW, and SW winds) and one (The South wind or South-East wind) is female.

Franz Wiggermann also discusses an association between the winds (which he denotes as N, E, S, and W) and various constellations; Ursa Major as the North Wind, Pisces as the South Wind, Scorpio as the West wind, and the Pleiades as the East Wind. Sometimes in incantation they are called upon as guardians, in one particular text the South and East winds are singled out as being guarding winds.

== Character ==
No clear genealogy is known for the winds, other than that they thought of as siblings. They are affiliated with Anu in some texts, as his creations or his messengers.

One Sumerian proverb describes them: "the North wind is the wind of satisfaction, the South wind overthrows the men it hits, the East wind is the wind that brings rain, and the West wind is mightier than the man living there."

=== The North-West or Regular Wind ===
The name for this wind, referred to sometimes as the North wind in earlier scholarship, can mean "normal", "regular" or "favorable" wind. This wind is likely what is called today as the Shamal, the most predictable wind in the Persian Gulf Region. Most often portrayed as a good force, a gentle wind that is reliable. Thought as having some connections to the goddess Ninlil, as well as Adad and Ninurta.

=== The North-East, East, or Mountain Wind ===
Usually translated simply as the East Wind, the etymology of the name is likely "mountain wind", or "direction of the mountains." It is argued that this wind should be referred to as the North East wind, stemming from the direction of the wind blowing off of the Zagros mountain chain being centered around the North East. This wind, in one ritual text, is referred to as a friend of the king Naram-Sin, and is also speculated to be associated with Enlil.

=== The South-East, or Cloud Wind ===
Usually translated as South wind, the name of this wind likely means "cloud wind." This wind may correlate to a modern-day counterpart, the Kaus which blows around the South and East and is associated with the rain and thunderstorms of the wet season. This wind is speculated to be feminine or female, as it is referred to with feminine pronouns in texts, and has been connected to the female winged figure on cylinder seals. She also has a connection to the god Ea and was speculated to have taken on a more divine roll, gaining a horned crown of divinity and losing her wings in later depictions. Sometimes this wind is characterized positively, but also had an evil aspect as a Demonic wind that needed to be chased away.

=== The South-West, or Amorite Wind ===
Translated typically as the West wind, possibly denotes a stormy wind, or a wind originating from the place where the sun sets. The name "Amorite Wind" comes from the Assyrian-Babylonian term for this wind, "amurru", corresponding to the Amorite peoples who inhabited regions in the west and northwest relative to the Babylonian territory. This wind is speculated to be associated with Anu. There is little characterization of this wind in texts, leading to theories that the image of this wind was repurposed and evolved into the demon Pazuzu.

== Appearances in myth ==
In Enuma Elish, Marduk marshals the Four Winds to assist in trapping the monstrous Tiamat. These winds were said to be given to him by Anu. The text also describes him summoning and unleashing seven evil winds similar to those wielded by Ninurta in the Anzu Epic.

The South Wind appears in the myth of Adapa as an antagonistic force, preventing the sage from fishing in the sea and sinking his boat. In response, Adapa breaks the Wind's wing, causing Anu to summon him to court when he realizes that the wind had stopped blowing. Stephanie Dalley argues that the South Wind is female in the myth, with the other three winds as her brothers.

In some versions of Gilgamesh, the winds are guides to the hero and his friend Enkidu, helping them navigate the cedar forest on the orders of Utu.

== Relationship to other mythological figures ==
=== Pazuzu ===
The demon Pazuzu, who first appeared in the early Iron Age, likely draws his iconography and much of his character from the Four Winds. He is also assigned the role of king over the lilu or wind demons as a category.

Franz Wiggermann claims that due to iconographic links (a shared crouching posture), Pazuzu may have been derived specifically from the masculine West Wind. There are also theories that Pazuzu possessing four wings represents his control over the totality of the wind demons. In one myth, Pazuzu narrates ascending a mountain, where he encounters other winds and breaking their wings.

=== Egyptian counterparts ===
Ancient Egyptian texts also have personifications of four winds, representing cardinal directions. These winds have some iconographic links to their Mesopotamian counterparts (both groups processing wings) but they are described in the Coffin Texts and other rituals as having more chimera-like bodies with other animal parts. In the Book of the Dead, they are said to come from different openings in the sky, while in another myth, they were created when a divine falcon beat its wings.

== See also ==
- Pazuzu – Mesopotamian demon
- lilu – Masculine Akkadian word for evil spirits
- Ugallu – Mythical monster in Babylonian religion

== Bibliography ==
- Dalley, Stephanie (2000). Myths from Mesopotamia : creation, the flood, Gilgamesh, and others. Oxford: Oxford University Press. ISBN 0-19-283589-0. OCLC 47780554.
- Neumann, J. (1977). "The Winds in the World of the Ancient Mesopotamian Civilizations". Bulletin of the American Meteorological Society. 58 (10). American Meteorological Society: 1050–1055. Bibcode:1977BAMS...58.1050N. doi:10.1175/1520-0477(1977)058<1050:TWITWO>2.0.CO;2. JSTOR 26218411.
- Noegel, Scott (2018-04-30). ""On the Wings of the Winds: Towards an Understanding of Winged Mischwesen in the Ancient Near East," KASKAL 14 (2017), pp. 15-54". Academia.edu.
- Wiggermann, Frans (2007-01-01). "The Four Winds and the Origins of Pazuzu". Academia.edu.
- Wiggermann, Frans A. M. (2005), "Pazuzu", Reallexikon der Assyriologie
