= Pazuzu =

Mesopotamian demon

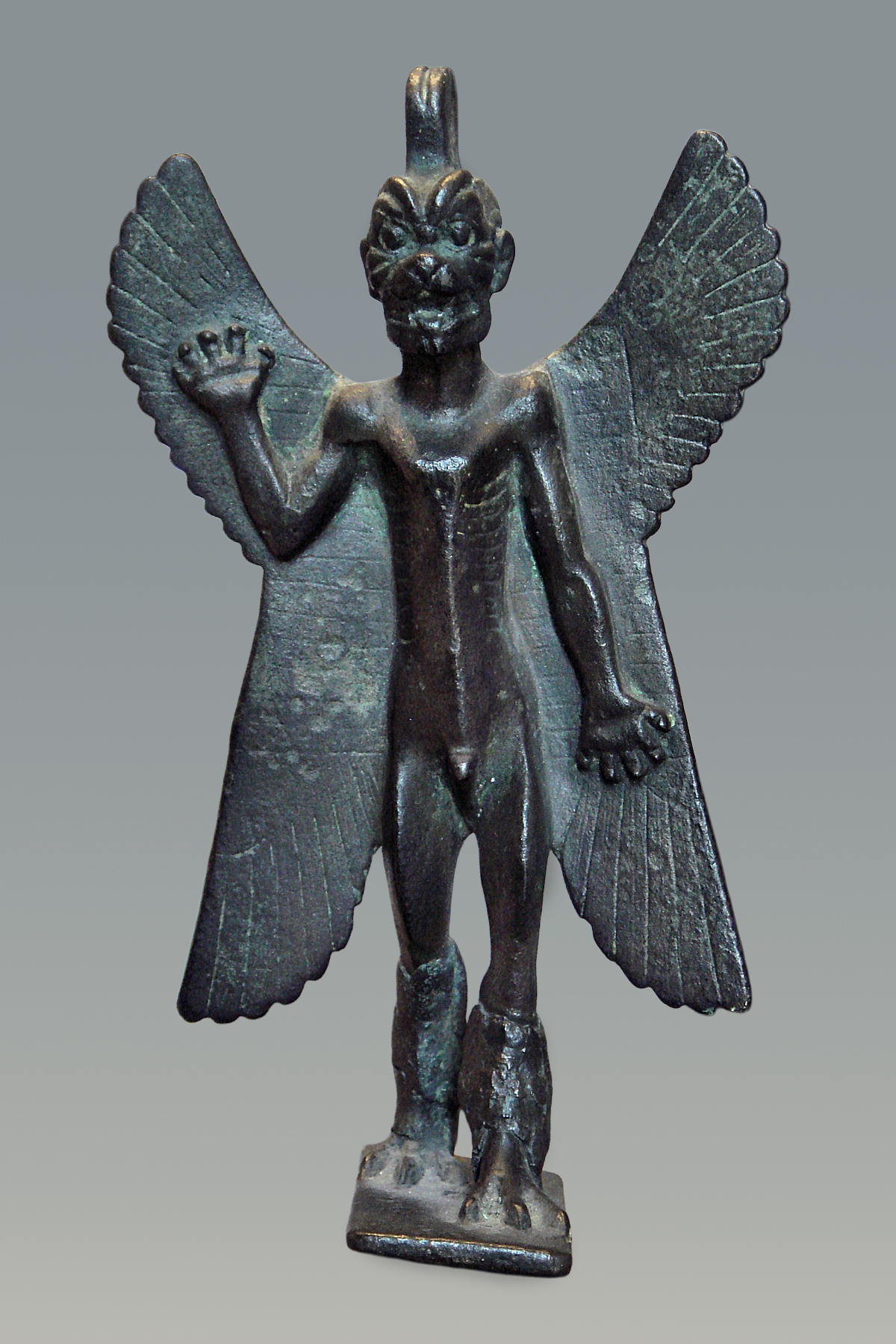
This Assyrian bronze statuette of Pazuzu is 15 cm (6 inches) in height, from the early 1st millennium BC, held at the Louvre Museum.

In ancient Mesopotamian religion, Pazuzu (Akkadian: 𒀭𒅆𒊒𒍪𒍪, romanized: pà.zu.zu) is a demonic deity from the Babylonian and Assyrian cultures in the first millennium BCE. He is shown with "a rather canine face with abnormally bulging eyes, a scaly body, a snake-headed penis, the talons of a bird and usually wings". He was believed to be the son of the god Hanbi.

He was usually regarded as evil, but he could also sometimes be a beneficent entity who protected against winds bearing pestilence and he was thought to be able to force the demoness Lamashtu, his rival, back to the underworld. Amulets bearing his image were positioned in dwellings to protect infants from Lamashtu and pregnant women frequently wore amulets with his head on them as protection from her.

As an apotropaic entity, he is considered as both a personification of a destructive and dangerous wind, but also as a repellent to other demons, one who safeguards the home from their influence. In particular he protects pregnant women and mothers, defending them from the machinations of Lamashtu. He is invoked in ritual and representations of him are used as defence charms.

== Function ==
Pazuzu has two chief aspects: firstly as a domestic spirit wherein he is frequently portrayed as benevolent, and secondly as the wandering wind demon traversing the mountains wherein he presents a wilder character.

=== Pazuzu as domestic protector deity ===
There is a well documented use of Pazuzu in Mesopotamian white magic. His inhuman and grotesque form can be inferred to have been used to frighten away unwanted guests, as well as prevent his wind-demon subjects from entering the home and wreaking havoc. His role in magic and ritual is documented within inscriptions on the backs of his statues, or in ritual texts. Spells, incantations, and special artifacts were used to gain the favour and protection of the demon, such as artifacts being placed in and/or around the home. They can also be worn on the person to achieve the desired effect.

==== Protective objects ====
Large numbers of Pazuzu heads have been discovered, made from a variety of materials; chiefly terracotta, but also bronze, iron, gold, glass, and bone. These heads often feature holes or loops at the top, allowing them to be worn on necklaces by pregnant women in order to protect the baby from evil forces. Occasionally, the heads would be attached to cylinder seals or worn as brooches as well. Some of these heads have been found in graves.

Carved amulets are common. Ritual texts from Uruk state that a woman could be given a bronze necklace or amulet of Pazuzu in order to protect her from miscarrying via the interference of demoness Lamashtu. Some are rectangular and depict Pazuzu either standing or crouching. Larger amulets made from stone could be hung on the wall to protect the room or an entrance. One of this type of amulet that was found inside a home in the Neo-Assyrian town of Dur-Katlimmu was lying on the floor of the main reception room and was thought to have been hung on the wall facing the entryway.

Given the number of artifacts uncovered, it can be inferred that Pazuzu enjoyed great popularity, and the uniformity of the heads, amulets, and statues demonstrates that representations of the demon-god were mass-produced.

==== Images ====
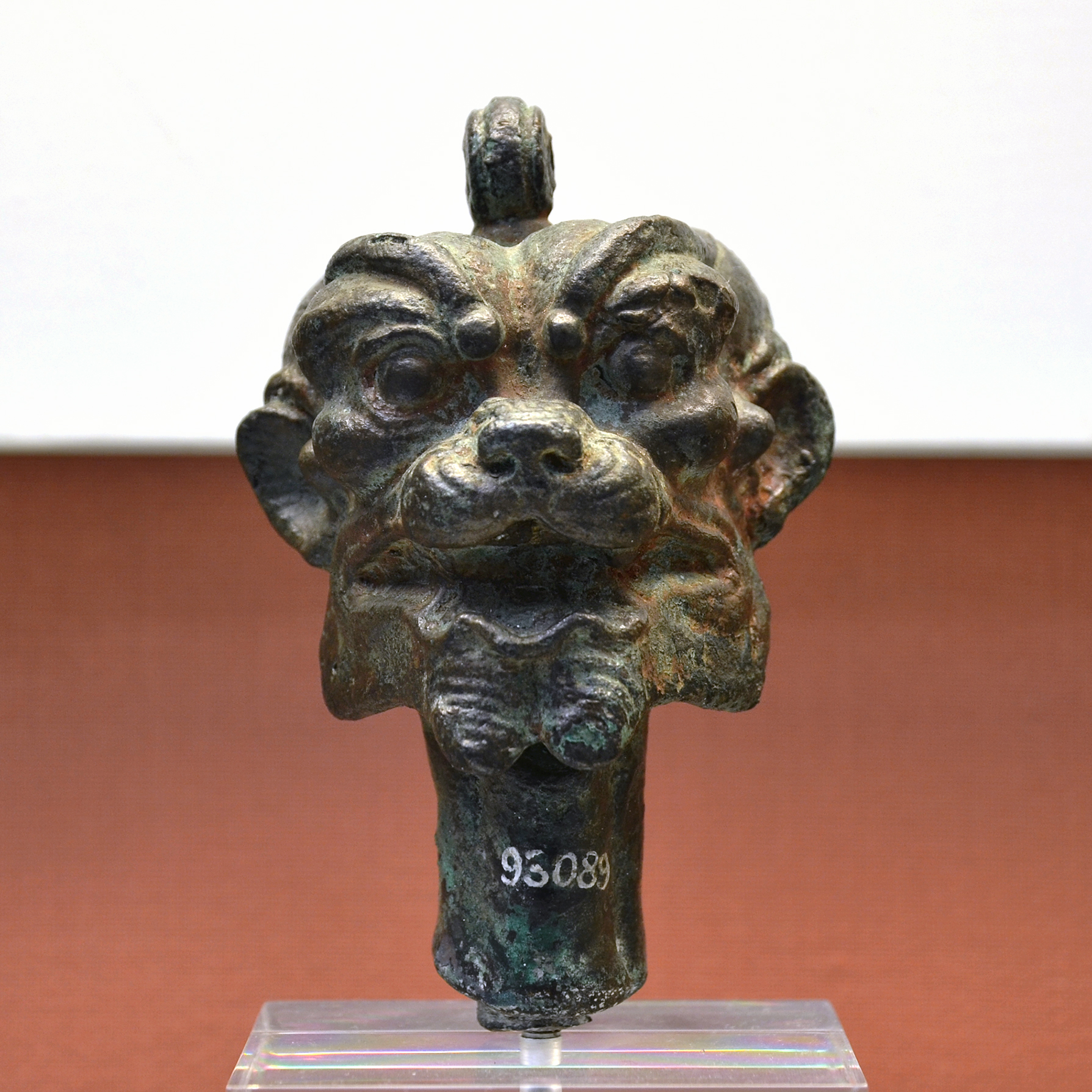
A bronze Pazuzu head, including a loop to be strung onto a necklace and worn as a protective charm.

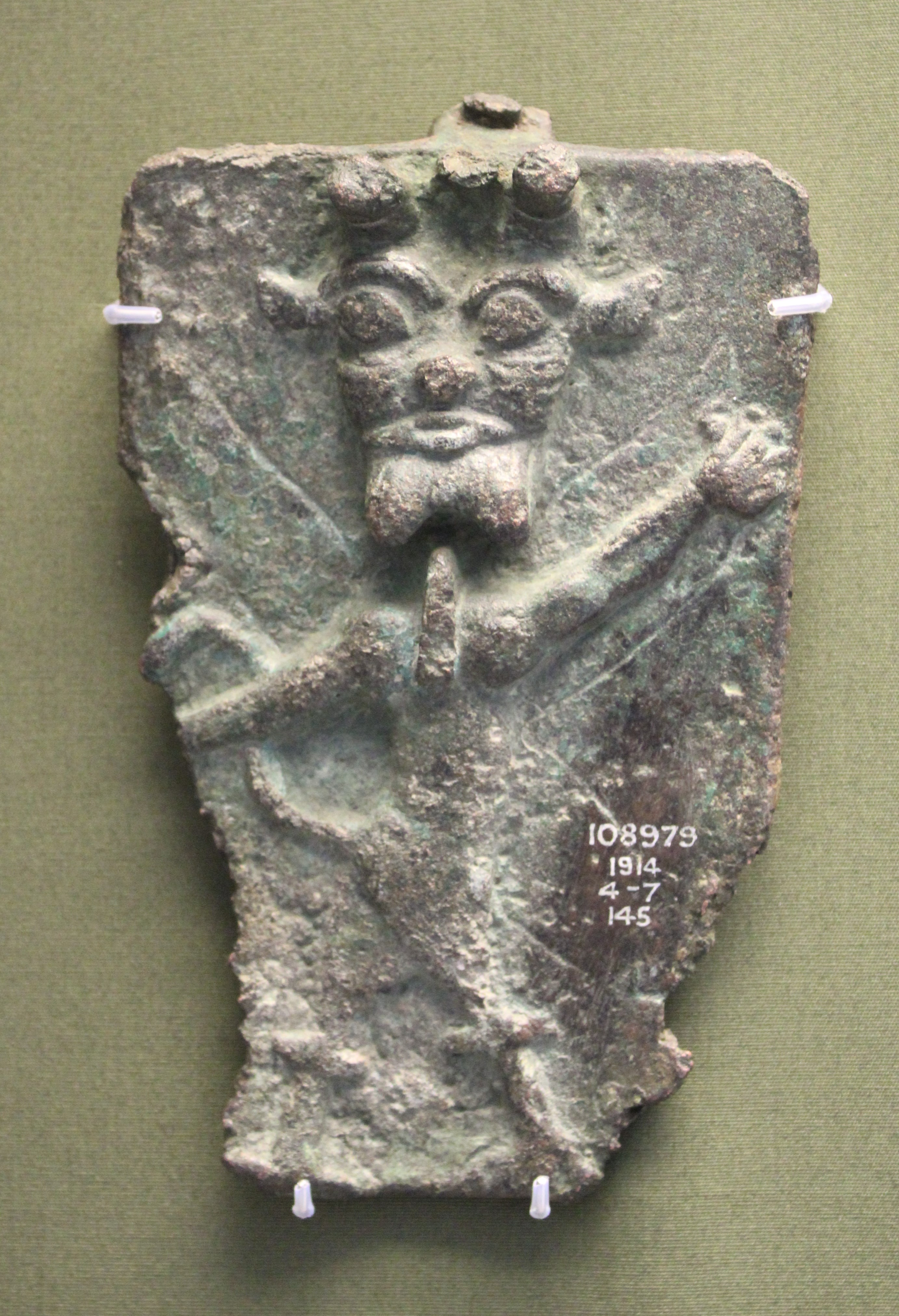
The front of a copper alloy Pazuzu amulet from the British Museum.

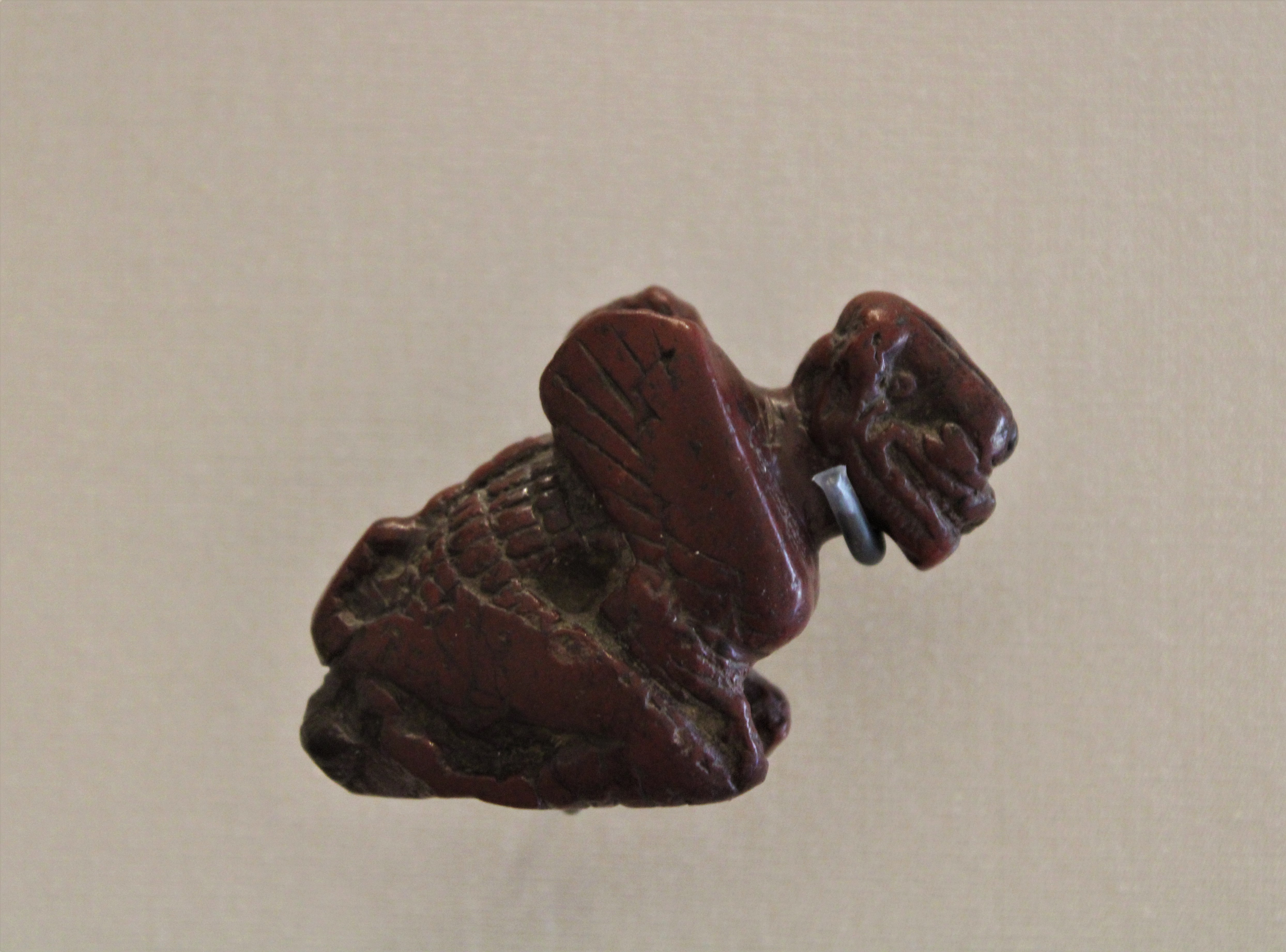
A red jasper carving of a squatting Pazuzu, the crouching posture suggesting his connection to the West Wind.

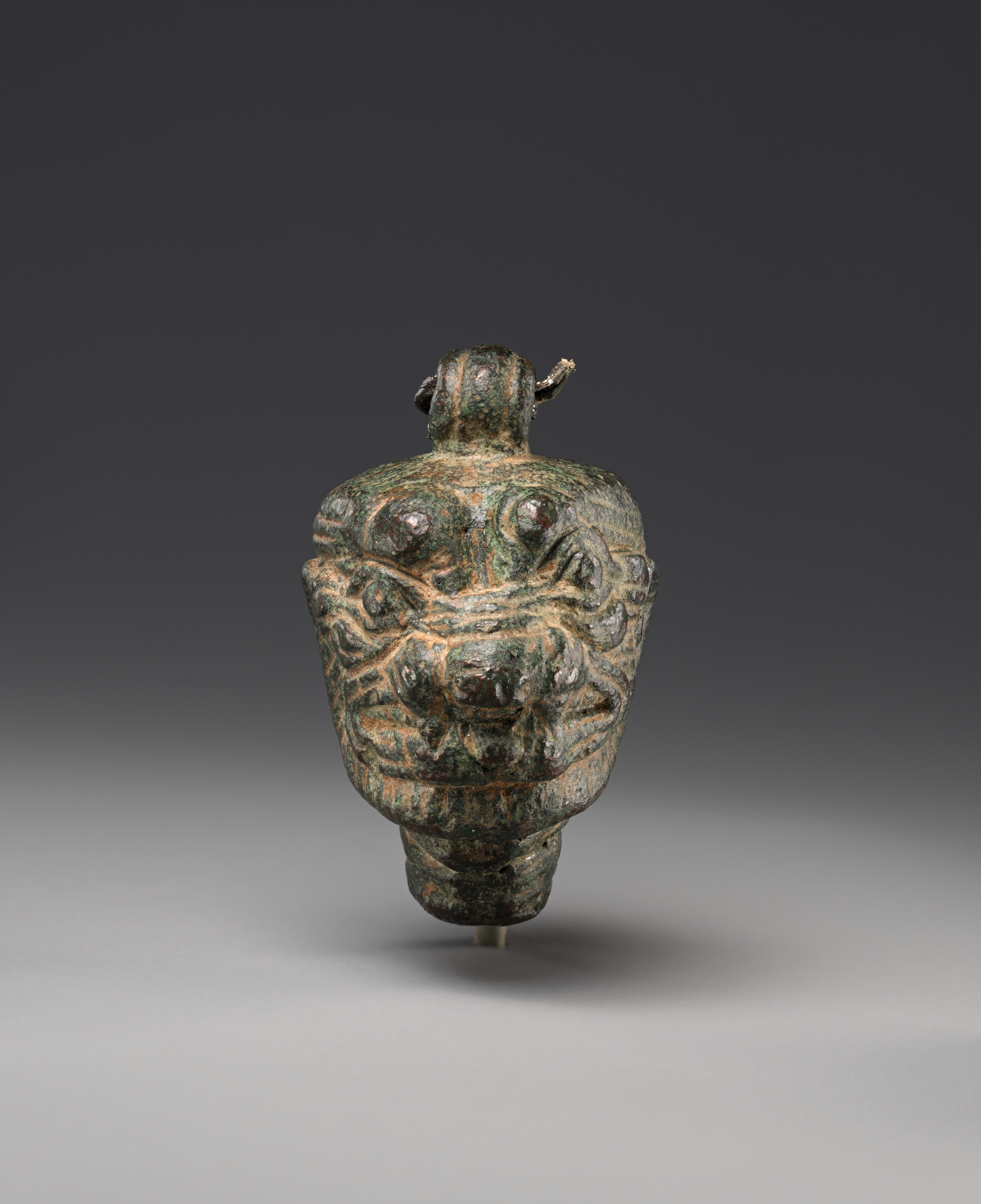
This bronze pendant features a suspension loop to ensure that the demon's gaze is always directed outward; for example, with the demon's apotropaic power directed, not at the amulet's owner, but at the owner's supernatural enemies.

Bronze Mesopotamian pendant of Pazuzu; three-quarter profile

==== Ritual texts ====
Relating to the representations of Pazuzu, text inscriptions on the backs of representations or on tablets would invoke or otherwise mention Pazuzu.

A ritual text from Assyria prescribes a Pazuzu head as a way to banish sickness. Similarly, a ritual incantation against demoness Lamastu from the Late Babylonian Period directs the reader to make a Pazuzu necklace and hang it around the afflicted person's neck.

In the bilingual (Sumerian and Akkadian) version of the Compendia, Pazuzu identifies himself:

"I am Pazuzu, son of Ḫanbu, king of the evil lilû-demons. I was enraged (in violent motion) against the strong mountains and ascended them."

Another text also narrated by him describes Pazuzu encountering other lilû demons in his travels, and breaking their wings, therefore preventing them from inflicting harm. "I ascended a mighty mountain that shook, and the (evil) winds I encountered there were heading West; One by one I broke their wings." In another text he is perceived as more malicious, as the narrator addresses him as "Agony of Mankind", "Suffering of Mankind", "Disease of Mankind", and chants telling the demon to not enter the home.

== Iconography ==
According to Eckart Frahm's study, the appearance of Pazuzu has remained fairly uniform throughout his history. Pazuzu is depicted as a combination of diverse animal and human parts. His body is of canine form, though scaled not furred, with birds' talons for feet, two pairs of wings, a scorpion's tail and a serpentine penis. He holds his right hand up and his left hand down. His face is striking, with gazelle horns, human ears, a doglike muzzle, bulging eyes, and wrinkles on the cheeks.

== Demonic relationships ==
=== Parents and siblings ===
His father is Hanbi, "The staggering one" or "The perverted one".

=== Wind demons ===
Lilû (wind) demons are the class to which Pazuzu and his subjects belong.

There is a connection to the earlier Babylonian personifications of The Four Winds. These beings, as depicted on several cylinder seals, have wings, and each represents a different wind direction; South, East, West, and North. Franz Wiggermann calls attention to the crooked positioning of the masculine West Wind in seals, as similar to posture in Pazuzu's iconography. More connections appear in later seals, as this same bent-over figure takes on talons and a scorpion's tail. The main difference in their depictions is the head, thus Wiggerman concludes that it is Pazuzu's body and not his head that denotes him as a wind demon. Another scholar, Scott Noegel, asserts that Pazuzu's possession of four wings links to the term kippatu, meaning "circle, loop, circumference, and totality", suggesting his control over all cardinal directions of wind inherited from his predecessors.

=== Lamashtu ===
The baby-snatching demoness Lamashtu was attested as both a subject of and an antagonist of Pazuzu. It is theorized that Pazuzu could have been created specifically as a counter to her. Initially she existed as an independent demoness, with no distinct connection to other demons. Then in the Late Bronze Age she took on the lilû demon classification, thus Pazuzu was introduced as a way to chase her from the home and back into the underworld. It does also seem to be that Pazuzu's first appearances and Lamastu's reassigning as a lilû both originate from the same time and place, the Middle Assyrian Empire, but this could be a coincidence.

On one Lamashtu amulet, a scene shows Pazuzu chasing the demoness away from her victim, while another displays him destroying it.

On a Neo-Assyrian bronze plaque, Pazuzu's head is perched above the top of the plaque, and a smaller version of him in the scene is chasing Lamashtu away down a river. Other protective spirits also appear in the plaque, including Apkallu a demigod and other animal-headed demons, there to protect the person who is lying down on a bed.

=== Bes ===
Some scholars believe that Egyptian demon Bes is a counterpart of Pazuzu. Both are known to be protector demons in the home. They have iconographic links: both having lion parts, wings, a distinctly long phallus, and similar facial features. There are noted similarities between the positioning of the two on protective amulets as well. Another close connection is their association with the protection of pregnant women and mothers.

There is evidence that the two were in each other's cultural spheres. A possible Pazuzu figure was found in Egypt, as well as Bes amulets uncovered in sites in Iran. In a seventh century era fort in Nimrud, five Pazuzu heads were found near a Bes amulet.

One theory posits a connection in their names – that Bes, like Pazuzu, could have been derived from the king name Bazi – although Pazuzu's name has not yet been proven to have originated from Bazi - Pazi -, nor, it is speculated, has Bes's name been proven to be of foreign origin.

=== Other protective demons ===
On some amulets, Pazuzu appears alongside Ugallu and Lulal, protective deities who were thought to solely benefit mankind thus their presences here may be apotropaic, or deployed to minimise Pazuzu's maleficent aspect. Their common positioning on the back of the amulet out of sight of the viewer could suggest the latter. They have also been present on the back of half-relief Pazuzu heads, again out of sight.

== In Mesopotamian religion ==
Pazuzu is the god of the southwestern wind and is associated with the plague. Pazuzu was invoked in apotropaic amulets, which combat the powers of his rival, the malicious goddess Lamashtu, who was believed to cause harm to mother and child during childbirth. He would protect humans against any variety of misfortune or plague.

== History ==
According to Wiggermann, the Pazuzu figure suddenly appeared in the Early Iron Age. His first visual depictions are not attested until the 8th century BC with the first finds being in the tombs of Nimrud, and his first appearances in texts trace to the 7th century BC. The majority of his representations were found in the 7th and 6th centuries BCE, with the most recent finds dating back to the time of the Seleucid Empire.

=== Name ===
One speculation for the origin of the name of Pazuzu connects to Bazi, as named in the Tell Leilan version of the Sumerian King List, who was a king of Mari. The name is followed by that of the succeeding king, Zizi. Bazi's name is preceded by Anbu, his father, who was suspected to have inspired the god Anbu, which later conflated into Hanbu, Pazuzu's father. The theory goes that, given the connection between Anbu and Hanbu, it could be that the name Pazuzu is a construction of the following kings names: Ba-zi-Zi-zi.

Like Pazuzu, Humbaba was used as a protector deity, with depictions of his frightening head being used to ward off evil. It could therefore be speculated that the Pazuzu heads replaced those of Humbaba. Humbaba fell from favour in the Late Bronze Age, shortly before Pazuzu emerged, although the two do not share any great iconographic connection, making it unlikely that Pazuzu could have evolved from the earlier deity.

Another speculation is that rather than Bes and Pazuzu having a common origin point, Pazuzu was an offshoot of Bes.

== In popular culture ==
According to Christian iconography, Pazuzu is most famous in western popular culture due to the 1971 novel The Exorcist and its 1973 film adaptation. In both instances, Pazuzu is the evil spirit that possesses the young girl Regan MacNeil.

== See also ==
- Abyzou
- Edimmu
- Enlil
- Hermeticism § "As above, so below"
- Kilili
- Lilitu
- Lulal
- Ugallu
- Umū dabrūtu

== Bibliography ==
- Black, Jeremy; Green, Anthony (1992), Gods, Demons and Symbols of Ancient Mesopotamia: An Illustrated Dictionary, Austin: University of Texas Press, ISBN 0-7141-1705-6
- El-Kilany, Engy (2017-01-01). "The Protective Role of Bes- image for Women and Children in Ancient Egypt". Journal of Association of Arab Universities for Tourism and Hospitality. 14 (2): 19–28. doi:10.21608/jaauth.2017.48140. ISSN 1687-1863.
- Heeßel, Nils P (2011-01-01). "Evil against evil. The Demon Pazuzu". In: L. Verderame (Ed.), Demoni mesopotamici, Studi e Materiali di Storia delle Religioni 77/2, Rome 2011, 357–368.
- Maiden, Brett (2018-01-01). "Counterintuitive Demons: Pazuzu and Lamaštu in Iconography, Text, and Cognition". Journal of Ancient Near Eastern Religions. 18 (1): 86–110. doi:10.1163/15692124-12341295. ISSN 1569-2116.
- Niederreiter, Zoltán (2018-01-06). "2017. "Two Pazuzu-head amulets inscribed with the standard B incantation" Revue d'assyriologie et d'archéologie orientale 111 (2017) 109–132". Academia.edu.
- Noegel, Scott (2018-04-30). ""On the Wings of the Winds: Towards an Understanding of Winged Mischwesen in the Ancient Near East," KASKAL 14 (2017), pp. 15–54". Academia.edu.
- Wiggermann, Frans A. M. (2005), "Pazuzu", Reallexikon der Assyriologie, pp. 372–381
- Wiggermann, Frans (2007-01-01). "The Four Winds and the Origins of Pazuzu". Academia.edu.
- "A Tale of Two Lands and Two Thousand Years: The Origins of Pazuzu". Mesopotamian Medicine and Magic. 2019-07-01.
- "Gorillaz – Humility (Official Video)". YouTube. 2022-03-25.
- "Rhinestone Eyes". YouTube. 2022-03-25.
- "Gorillaz – Désolé ft. Fatoumata Diawara (Episode Two)". YouTube. 2022-03-25.
