= American Anthropologist =

- Discipline: Anthropology
- Language: English
- Edited by: Elizabeth Chin

Publication details
- History: 1888–present
- Publisher: Wiley for the American Anthropological Association (USA)
- Frequency: Quarterly
- Open access: Hybrid Open Access
- Impact factor: 1.7 (2024)

Standard abbreviations
- ISO 4: Am. Anthropol.

Indexing
- ISSN: 0002-7294
- JSTOR: 00027294

Links
- Journal homepage

American Anthropologist is the flagship journal of the American Anthropological Association (AAA), published quarterly by Wiley. The "New Series" began in 1899 under an editorial board that included Franz Boas, Daniel G. Brinton, and John Wesley Powell. The current editor-in-chief is Elizabeth Chin. Dána-Ain Davis and Sameena Mulla will take over as editors-in-chief in 2027.

The journal publishes research articles from all subfields of anthropology as well as book reviews and obituaries, and includes sections on Public Anthropologies, Multimodal Anthropologies, and World Anthropologies. The journal also maintains a website with essays, virtual issues, teaching resources, and supplementary material for print articles.

== Past editors ==
F. W. Hodge (1899–1910)

John R. Swanton (1911)

F. W. Hodge (1912–1914)

Pliny E. Goddard (1915–1920)

John R. Swanton (1921–1923)

Robert H. Lowie (1924–1933)

Leslie Spier (1934–1938)

Ralph Linton (1939–1944)

J. Alden Mason (1945–1948)

Melville J. Herskovits (1949–1952)

Sol Tax (1953–1955)

Walter R. Goldschmidt (1956–1959)

Edward H. Spicer (1960–1962)

George D. Spindler (1963–1966)

Ward H. Goodenough (1967–1970)

Laura Bohannan (1971–1973)

Robert A. Manners (1974–1975)

Richard B. Woodbury (1976–1978)

David L. Olmsted (1979–1981)

H. Russell Bernard (1982–1985)

Thomas C. Greaves (1985–1986)

H. Russell Bernard (1986–1989)

Janet Keller (1990–1993)

Barbara Tedlock & Dennis Tedlock (1993–1997)

Robert Sussman (1998–2001)

Susan H. Lees & Fran Mascia-Lees (2001–2005)

Ben Blount (2005–2007)

Tom Boellstorff (2007–2012)

Michael Chibnik (2012–2016)

Deborah A. Thomas (2016–2020)

== Four-field approach ==
The four main subfields of anthropology include cultural, linguistic, archeology, and biological/physical. Sometimes applied anthropology and public anthropology are added as additional subfields.

Among the journals published by the AAA, American Anthropologist is the only one that follows the "four-field" approach, publishing articles from the four main subfields of anthropology. Proponents of the four-field approach see American Anthropologist's broad scope as important to maintaining disciplinary unity, while critics have expressed serious reservations about this aim, and criticize pressures since the 1970s against editors and works that do not subscribe to four-field holism as an ideal for anthropological scholarship.

In 2010, then editor-in-chief Tom Boellstorff proposed that American Anthropologist be viewed as an "interdisciplinary" journal, arguing that the goal should be "to present the best work in 'anthropology'—as defined in the broadest possible sense. That certainly includes work that speaks across subdisciplines in some manner, often by integrating methods, problematics, and relevant literatures from more than one subfield. However, it also includes work that is not invested in the four-field concept and presents itself as, say, cultural anthropology or archaeology, with no reference to a four-field vision of 'the discipline.'"
