= Hanbi =

Mesopotamian god of evil

In Sumerian and Akkadian mythology (and Mesopotamian mythology in general) Hanbi or Hanpa (more commonly known in western text) was the lord of evil, lord of all evil forces (Udug) and the father of Pazuzu.

Aside from his relationship with Pazuzu, very little is known of this figure.

Some have connected Hanbi to Helel, the Jewish name generally equated to Lucifer in Christian thought. However, Hanbi's characteristic of being a shadow born in the underworld, different from the Sumerian gods (Dingir) of the underworld, would make him more similar to the concept of the Jewish shedim and se'iri or the Islamic shaitan.

== See also ==
- List of Mesopotamian deities
