= Dennis Tedlock =

Academic (1939 – 2016)

Dennis Ernest Tedlock
- Born: June 19, 1939; St. Joseph, Missouri, U.S.
- Died: June 3, 2016 (aged 76)
- Education: Tulane University
- Occupation: Professor
- Spouse: Barbara Tedlock
- Writing career
- Notable awards: American Anthropological Association President's Award

Dennis Ernest Tedlock (June 19, 1939 – June 3, 2016) was an ethnopoeticist, linguist, translator, and poet. He was a leading expert of Mayan language, culture, and arts, best known for his definitive translation of the Mayan text, Popul Vuh, for which he was awarded the PEN translation prize. He co-founded the method of ethnopoetics with Jerome Rothenburg in the late 1960s.

== Early life ==
He received his Ph.D. in 1968 from Tulane University. In 1986, he won the PEN Translation Prize for his book Popul Vuh: The Mayan Book of the Dawn of Life, and in 1997 was the joint recipient of the American Anthropological Association President's Award, along with his wife, Barbara Tedlock.

Raised in New Mexico, he earned his bachelor's degree from the University of New Mexico and a PhD in anthropology from Tulane University. He conducted most of his field work with his wife, Barbara Tedlock. The worked primarily with Mayan peoples in Guatemala and Belize.

== Publications ==
Tedlock published 10 books and over 100 articles. He was editor of 3 academic journals, including the flagship publication of the American Anthropological Association. At the time of his death, he was the McNulty Professor of English and research professor of anthropology at the State University of New York at Buffalo.

Tedlock was a proponent of dialogical anthropology, seeking to give indigenous peoples more input into the Western academic work written about their culture and practices. For his translation of the Popul Vuh, he consulted with Maya K’iche’ daykeeper, Andrés Xiloj.
