= Lamashtu =

Mesopotamian mythological figure

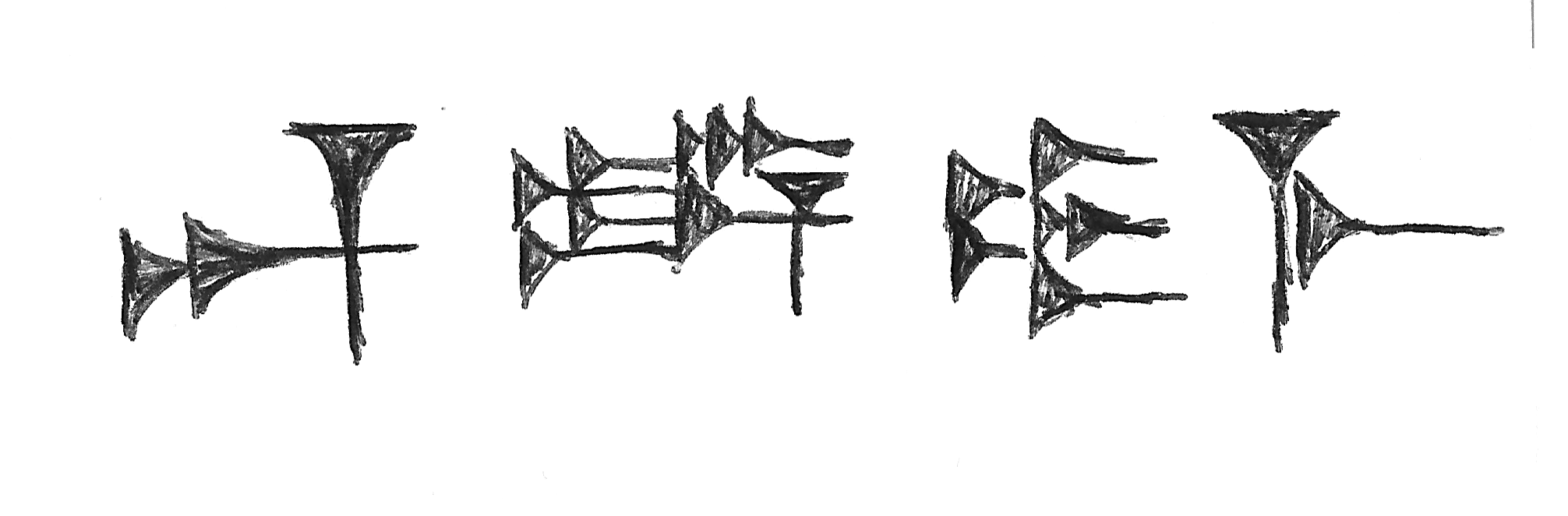
Sumerian name in Old Babylonian cuneiform, ^{d}Dim_{3}-me

In Mesopotamian mythology, Lamashtu (𒀭𒈕𒈨; Akkadian ^{d}La-maš-tu; Sumerian Dimme ^{d}Dim_{3}-me or Kamadme), the daughter of the sky god Anu, is a demonic Mesopotamian deity that spread disease and was widely blamed as the cause of miscarriages and cot deaths.

Although Lamashtu has traditionally been identified as a demoness, the fact that she could cause evil on her own without the permission of other deities strongly indicates that she was seen as a goddess in her own right. Mesopotamian peoples protected themselves against her using amulets and talismans. She was believed to ride in her boat on the river of the underworld and she was associated with donkeys.

== Characterization ==
=== Appearance ===
Lamashtu has the "head of a lion, the teeth of a donkey, naked breasts, a hairy body, hands stained (with blood?), long fingers and fingernails, and the feet of Anzû".

=== Character ===
Lamashtu's father was the sky god Anu. Unlike many other usual demonic figures and depictions in Mesopotamian lore, Lamashtu was said to act in malevolence of her own accord, rather than at the gods' instructions. Along with this, her name was written together with the cuneiform determinative indicating deity, making her a goddess in her own right.

Lamashtu's main victims were unborn or newly born babies, and by extension pregnant women. She touched the woman's stomach seven times to kill the baby, or kidnap it from the wet nurse. Babies and young children were not her sole victims, as those also included adolescents, adults and even old people. In this instance, Lamashtu functions as a bringer of disease.

== Mesopotamian sources ==
=== Sumerian and Akkadian Literature ===
==== Atra-Hasis Myth ====
Pashittu/Pašittu, "the Exterminator", which is a name of Lamashtu, appears in the Atra-hasis myth to keep the population growth in check. Enki, during his speech, says:

Let there be the pašittu-demon among the people, to snatch the baby from its mother's lap.

In this myth, Lamashtu is part of the divine order, which represents a minority view that does not seem to inform the exorcistic rituals, as in those, the gods help against her, and she does not operate on divine assignment.

==== Names ====
Lamashtu's seven names are frequently encountered in incantations and on amulets. The incantation opens by addressing Lamashtu, "Dimme/Kamadme, daughter of Anu", and the names that follow appear like descriptive epithets. One of Lamashtu's obscure names is "adopted daughter of Irnina", while in other occasions, she borrows the name of goddess Inanna.

One amulet example that includes Lamashtu's names is AO 8184:

Oh, 'Dimme'. 'Daughter of Anu',

'Who was named by the gods',

'Victoria, heroine among ladies',

'Dimme (or: Lamaštu) the exalted',

'Who holds the evil Asakku in a tight grip',

'South Wind weighing heavily on mankind',

you must not approach (this) person.

==== Astrology ====
LBAT 1597 is an astral-medical text. It mentions diseases, which are all ascribed to celestial influences.

6. If (the moon is) in the region of Taurus and Orion, joint-disease, vertigo, maškadu-disease, šû-disease, seizure; [alternatively] lamaštu-disease (lit. 'Daughter of Anu') (in) Orion (and) Saturn. 9. If (the moon is) in the region of Leo, lamaštu, labašu, and ahhazu-demons, the seized-by-lamaštu(-disease), seized by lamaštu day-and-night(-disease), the god is a lion related to a belligerent god, Ištar, and Hand of the Ghost-disease, (in the region of) Venus and Leo.

==== Relationship with spirits ====
The demon Pazuzu was invoked to protect birthing mothers and infants against Lamashtu's malevolence, usually on amulets and statues. Although Pazuzu was said to be bringer of famine and drought, he was also invoked against evil for protection, and against plague, and was primarily and popularly invoked against his fierce, malicious rival Lamashtu. Although Pazuzu frequently appears on amulets, he is absent from the Lamashtu rituals.

=== Magical Corpus ===
==== Lamashtu Incantations ====
Lamashtu incantations were gathered and published by Walter Farber. One such incantation against Lamashtu is the following:

Spell: She is monstrous, the Daughter-of-Anu, who wreaks havoc among the babies.
Her paws are a snare net, her bosom (hold?) spells death.
Cruel, raging, malicious, rapacious, violent,
destructive, aggressive is the Daughter-of-Anu.
She lays hands on the womb(s) of women in labor,
she pulls the babies from (the hold of) the nannies,
suckles (them), sings (to them), and covers (them) with kisses.
The weapons she uses are powerful, (and) her muscles are very agile.
The Daughter-of-Anu acts as the wet-nursing priestess/nun of the gods, her brothers.
Her head is a lion’s head, donkey’s teeth are [her] teeth?
Her lips are a gale and spread death.
From deep in the mountains she came down,
roaring like a lion,
whimpering all the time like a bitch.

— Lamaštu Series II, Inc. 12

== Amulets and iconography ==
Lamashtu was represented in a distinctive but historically variable iconography on amulets and other apotropaic objects. Early representations could vary considerably in their treatment of her head and other features, while later first-millennium BCE examples developed more standardized compositions.

Mesopotamian texts and images describe Lamashtu as a composite being combining human and animal characteristics. Her appearance could include a canine or leonine face or head, the teeth of a donkey or dog, the talons of a bird of prey, wings, and other animal features. Surviving amulets likewise show considerable variation. While Lamashtu is generally depicted as clearly female and nude, her genitalia are deliberately omitted. On an obsidian amulet in the Metropolitan Museum of Art, for example, Lamashtu has a lion-griffin-like head, raised clawed hands, and the feet of a bird of prey.

A number of iconographic elements became particularly characteristic. Lamashtu could be shown holding serpents, standing or moving upon a donkey, and accompanied by a dog and a pig or piglet, which in some representations suckle at her breasts. Other amulets depict her with objects including a comb and spindle. These features did not occur uniformly on every object; typological studies distinguish earlier and later forms of the iconography, including images emphasizing a threatening figure with raised hands, a figure holding a comb and spindle, and the more elaborate serpent-holding compositions of the first millennium BCE.

The largest and most elaborate examples integrate Lamashtu's image into scenes of ritual protection. The Neo-Assyrian "Plaque des Enfers" in the Louvre depicts divine symbols and protective beings above a ritual scene involving a sick person and ritual specialists. In its lower register, Lamashtu holds two serpents while positioned on a donkey in a boat; a dog and pig are shown at her breasts, while Pazuzu appears as an opposing protective force. Related plaques similarly combine the afflicted patient, protective figures, divine symbols, offerings, Lamashtu, and Pazuzu.

Representations of Lamashtu were themselves part of protective and exorcistic practices rather than simply images of the demon. Amulets bearing her image could be worn, attached to the body or garments, or placed near beds, doorways, and other vulnerable spaces, while inscriptions and accompanying ritual imagery identified and acted against the demon. The material form of these objects, including their portability, suspension devices, inscriptions, and placement, formed part of their intended apotropaic efficacy.

Pazuzu is frequently associated with this protective imagery but should be distinguished iconographically and functionally from Lamashtu. Although Pazuzu was himself a demonic being, his image and name could be employed against Lamashtu. His head was worn as a pendant or incorporated into plaques and other objects, where his threatening appearance was used apotropaically to repel her. On some Lamashtu plaques he is shown confronting or driving away Lamashtu, while his head could also appear separately as a protective device.

=== Amulets ===
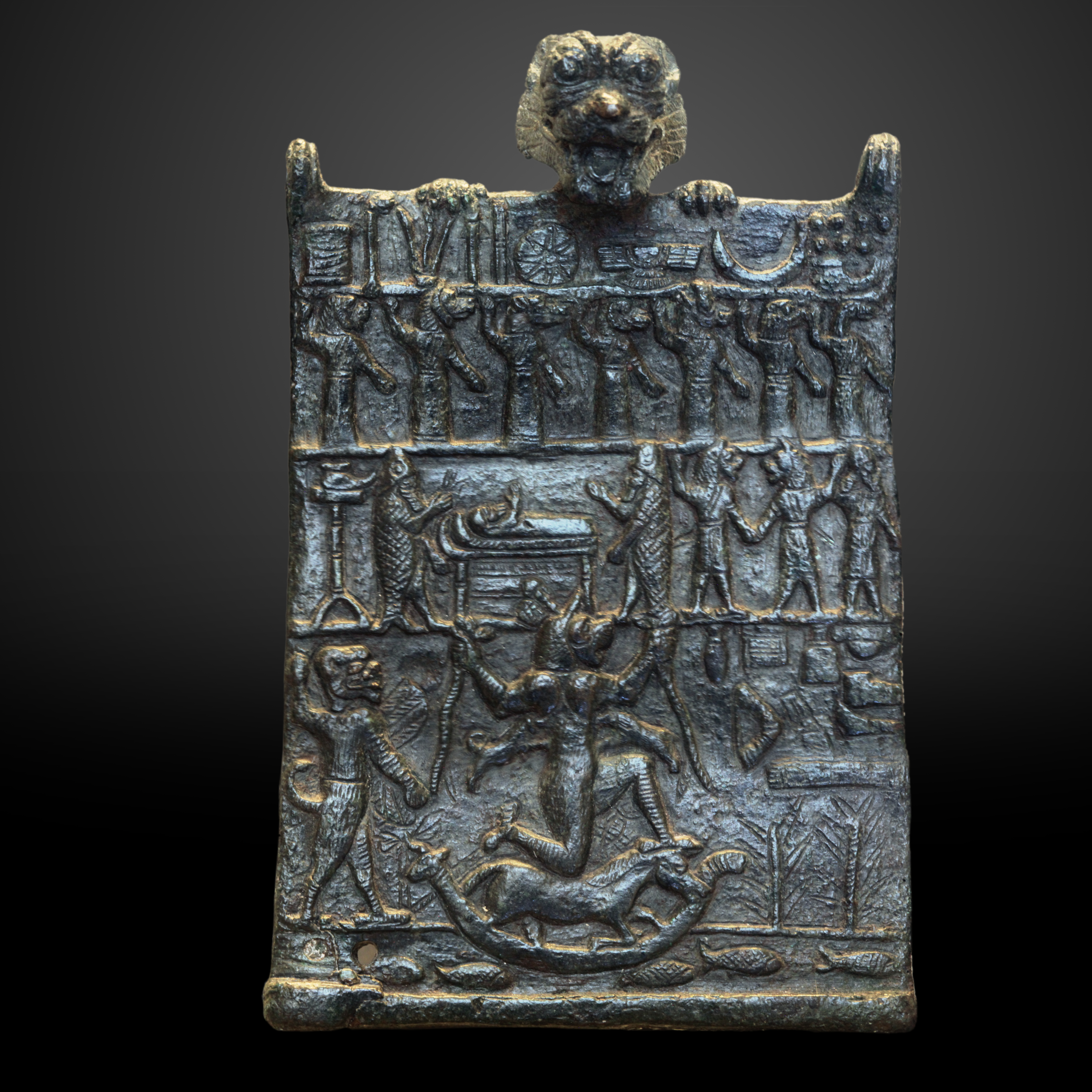
Lamashtu plaque held by Pazuzu

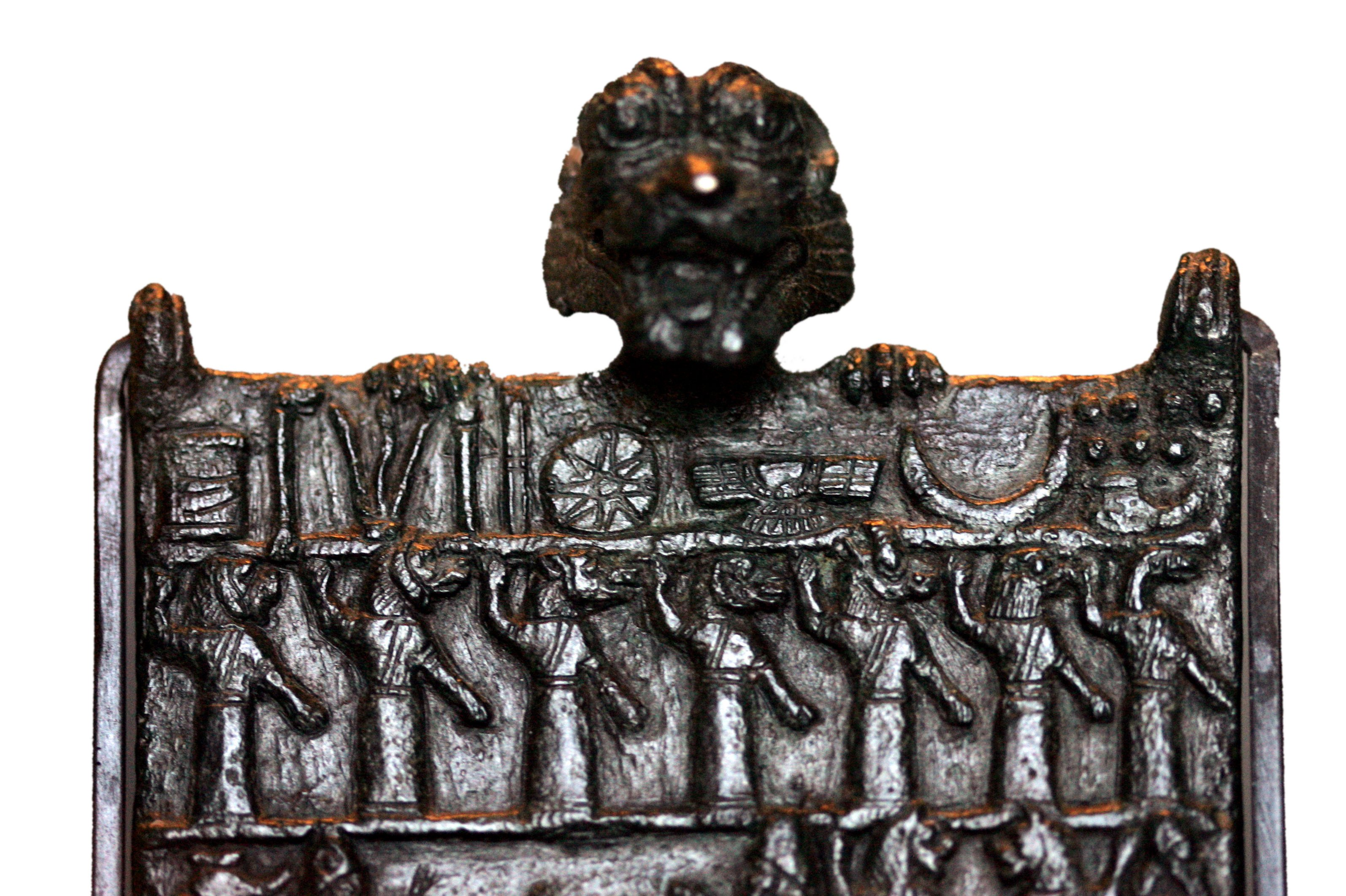
Close-up of plaque's top register

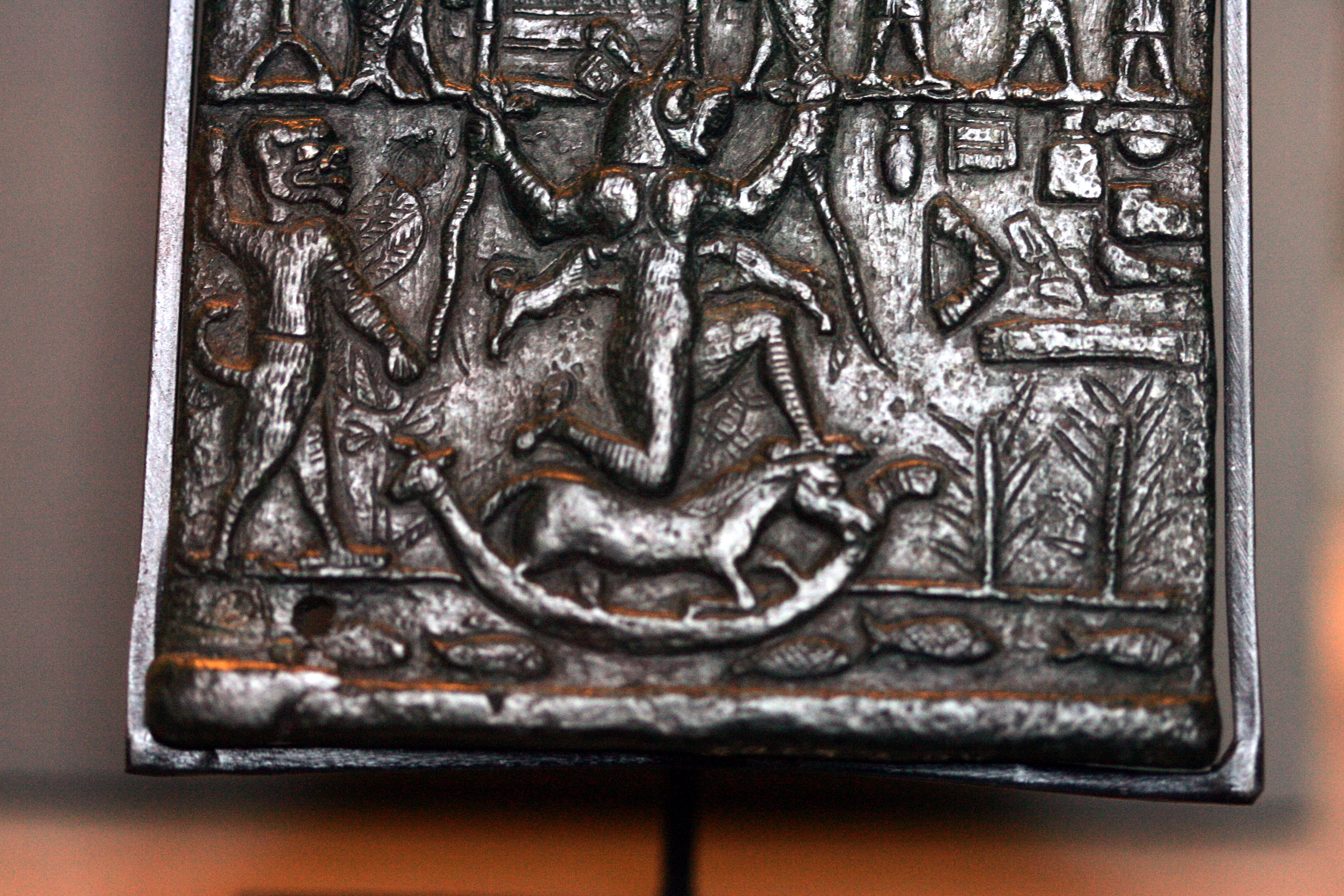
Close-up of plaque's bottom register

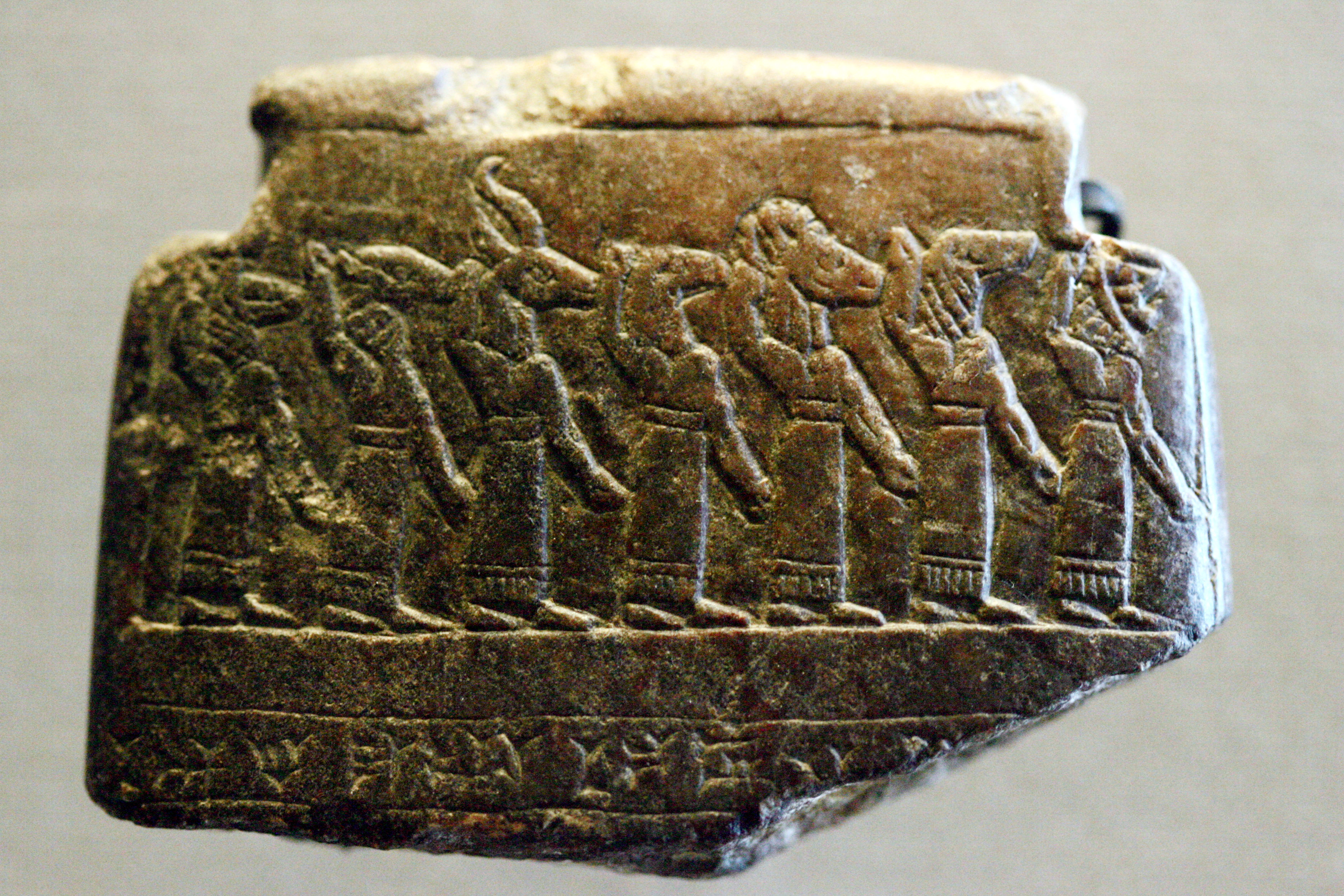
Lamashtu plaque

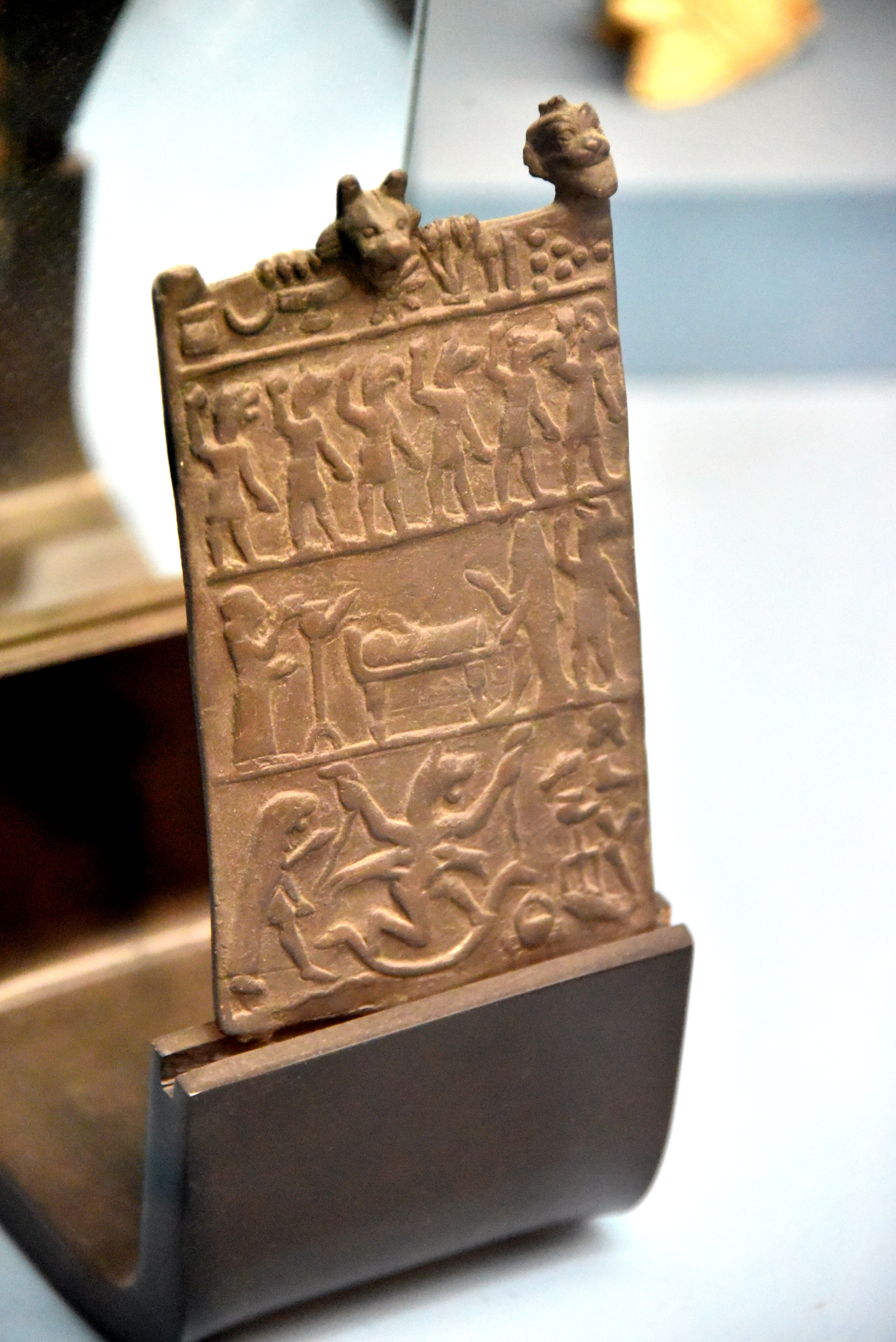
Bronze plate, several Mesopotamian deities ward off evil spirits. From northern Iraq. 9th–7th century BCE. Ancient Orient Museum, Istanbul

== In modern culture ==
- Lamashtu is depicted on the Ankaran Sarcophagus in the 2004 video game Vampire: The Masquerade – Bloodlines.
- Lamashtu is a demon lord and the goddess of monsters, called the Mother of Beasts and Mistress of Insanity, in the Pathfinder Roleplaying Game which was released in 2009.
- In the 2014 TV series Constantine, Lamashtu appeared in the 8th Episode ("The Saint of Last Resorts"). In that episode protagonist John Constantine invoked Pazuzu to fight against it. The episode was written by Carly Wray and directed by T. J. Scott.
- Lamashtu is the title of a 2015 audiobook by Paul E Cooley.
- Lamashtu appears as the antagonist in the 2017 film Still/Born.
- The song "lamashtu" by Necrophobic on their 2018 album Mark of the Necrogram is named for Lamashtu.
- Lamashtu is worshipped in the 2022 Spanish horror film Venus.
- Lamashtu appears as the demon who possesses two young girls in the 2023 film The Exorcist: Believer.
- Lamashtu and her connections with Lilith are presented in the book Lilith and Lamastu: Legends of the Ancient Abyss by Michael W. Ford, October 2024.
- Lamashtu is summoned in a 2025 Saturday Night Live sketch featuring Lady Gaga.

== See also ==
- Abyzou
- Ardat-lilî
- Akhkhazu
- Alû
- Gello
- Lamassu
- Lamia
- Lilin
- Lilith
- Lilu (mythology)
- Shedim
- Utukku
