= Andrés Xiloj =

Andrés Xiloj Peruch was a Kʼicheʼ daykeeper (Kʼicheʼ: ajq'ij) from Momostenango in Guatemala. He was also one of the four "chuchkajawib" (lineage leaders) of Momostenango. After his death, his son Angél became chuchkajaw of the Santa Isabel lineage. Being a native speaker of the Kʼicheʼ language and a practitioner of traditional Maya calendric divination, he served as a consultant for several anthropological studies. He assisted Dennis Tedlock in elaborating his award-winning translation of the ancient Kʼicheʼ document Popol Vuh. Dennis Tedlock has described the translation process as "three-way dialogue among Andres Xiloj, the Popol Vuh text, and myself."
