= Kilili =

Mesopotamian demon

In ancient Mesopotamian religion, Kilili, ki.li.li; was a female demon of Sumerian origin, likely associated with owls. She is also attested as a minor goddess who functioned as a servant of Ishtar. She was usually affiliated with Ishtar. Direct identification between them, while attested, is limited to a single late esoteric explanatory text.

Kilili has been identified with the winged goddess depicted in the Burney Relief. Frans Wiggermann, who has done a number of in-depth studies on Mesopotamian demons, asserts that the evidence for the figure as Kilili is the most compelling. The figure on the relief is a goddess, associated with Ishtar (the presence of the lions), has birdlike qualities (linking to Kilili), and contains owls as well, the bird specifically affiliated with Kilili.

== Function and Associations ==
Kilili's name is that of a bird, most likely an owl. In one document she is equated with ^{d}ab-ba-šú-šú, meaning "she who leans on the window" in Sumerian. She could be called as "queen of the windows", "the one of haunted places" and it assumed she was imagined as an owl-demoness.

She was usually affiliated with Ishtar. Direct identification between them, while attested, is limited to a single late esoteric explanatory text. In the god list An = Anum she is one of Ishtar's eighteen messengers (^{lú}kin-gi-a), alongside other similar figures such as Barīrītu ("she who comes at dusk") and Abtagigi. Kilili under the name ^{d}ab-ba-šú-šú could be considered as a complement to the goddess Abtagigi, whose name means "retiring through the window." Kilili can be considered as having a connection to sex due to her link with Ishtar, however the "window" in her name is likely not implicating prostitution, unlike for the succubus Kisikil-lila (also called Ardat-lilî). The phrase "spilling through the window" can also reference various evils, and Kilili's name has no clear connection to that of Kisikil-lila.

== Worship ==
According to the Tākultu text from the Neo-Assyrian period, she was also worshiped in one of the temples of the goddess Gula, located in Assur. She was also present in neo-Babylonian Uruk, as indicated by a document mentioning offerings of dates to her and a number of pieces of jewelry dedicated to her. She continued to be worshiped there in the Seleucid period. There is also evidence that she was worshipped elsewhere at a temple of Bēlet-Ninua in the neo-Babylonian period.

== Possible Depiction in The Burney Relief ==
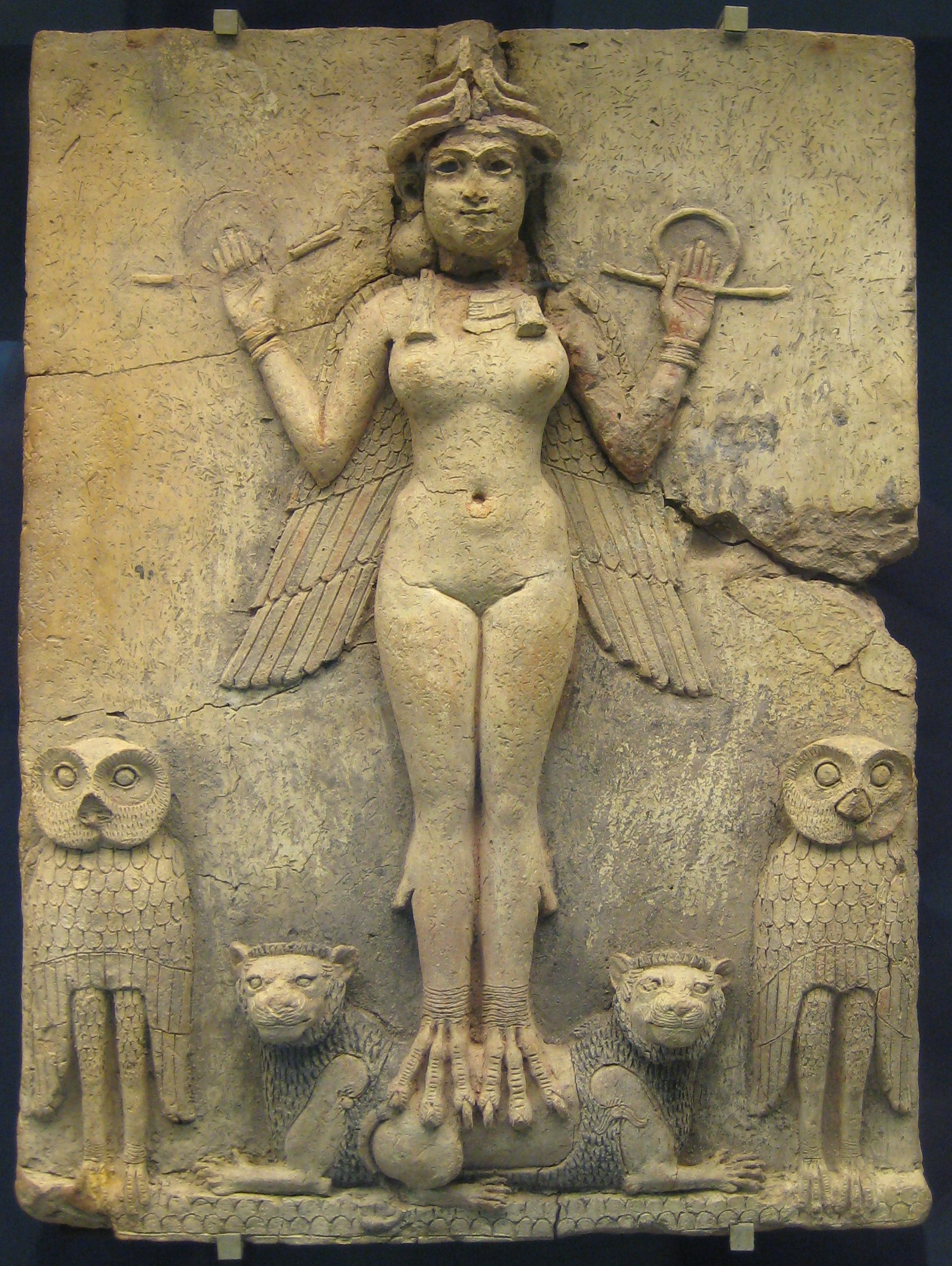
The Burney Relief

The Burney Relief, also known as The Queen of the Night relief, is a terracotta panel from the Old Babylonian Period depicting a nude female figure, standing upon two lions flanked by owls. The goddess possesses wings and birdlike talons, and wears a horned tiara. Several theories as to which deity the relief depicts have been proposed, most commonly Inanna/Ishtar, due to the presence of her symbols (lions), the nudity, and the possible connection between the relief and the myth Inanna's Descent into the Underworld. Frans Wiggermann, who has done a number of in-depth studies on Mesopotamian demons, asserts that the evidence for the figure as Kilili is the most compelling. The figure on the relief is a goddess, associated with Ishtar (the presence of the lions), has birdlike qualities (linking to Kilili), and contains owls as well, the bird affiliated with her. Unaccounted for are the "loop-ring" symbols held in the hands of the goddess, though this is equally a mystery for any other identification of the goddess.

== Works cited ==
- Lambert, Wilfred G. (1980), "Kilili", Reallexikon der Assyriologie
- Beaulieu, Paul-Alain (2003). The pantheon of Uruk during the neo-Babylonian period. Leiden Boston: Brill STYX. ISBN 978-90-04-13024-1. OCLC 51944564.
- Finkel, Irving L. (2021). The first ghosts : most ancient of legacies. London. ISBN 978-1-5293-0326-1. OCLC 1090201481.
- Wiggermann, Frans (2011-01-01). "The Mesopotamian Pandemonium". SMSR 77/2.
- Wiggermann, Frans (2007). "Some Demons of Time and their Functions in Mesopotamian Iconography". In Groneberg, Brigitte; Spieckermann, Hermann (eds.). Beihefte zur Zeitschrift für die alttestamentliche Wissenschaft. Berlin, New York: Walter de Gruyter. pp. 102–116. doi:10.1515/9783110204155.1.102. ISBN 978-3-11-019463-0. ISSN 0934-2575.
