= Barbara Tedlock =

American cultural anthropologist

- Born: September 9, 1942; Battle Creek, Michigan
- Died: September 11, 2023 (aged 81); Rio Rancho, New Mexico
- Education: University of California, Berkeley; Wesleyan University; SUNY Albany
- Occupation: Professor
- Spouse: Dennis Tedlock
- Writing career
- Notable awards: American Anthropological Association President's Award

Barbara Helen Tedlock (September 9, 1942 – September 11, 2023) was an American cultural anthropologist and oneirologist. She was a Distinguished Professor of Anthropology at the State University of New York, Buffalo. Her work explores cross-cultural understanding and communication of dreams, ethnomedicine, and aesthetics and focuses on the indigenous Zuni of the Southwestern United States and the Kʼicheʼ Maya of Mesoamerica. Through her study and practice of the healing traditions of the Kʼicheʼ Maya of Guatemala, Tedlock became initiated into shamanism. She was the collaborator and wife of the late anthropologist and poet Dennis Tedlock.

== Early life and education ==
Barbara Helen Tedlock was born in Battle Creek, Michigan, to Byron Taylor and Mona Gerteresse (O'Connor) McGrath.

Tedlock earned a Bachelor's degree in Rhetoric from the University of California, Berkeley in 1967. In 1973, she earned a Master's in Anthropology and Ethnomusicology from Wesleyan University. Tedlock completed her PhD in Anthropology at SUNY Albany in 1978.

== Career ==
After earning her PhD, Tedlock taught at Tufts University, Princeton University, the University of Texas at Austin, and the University of British Columbia. In 1987, Tedlock joined the State University of New York, Buffalo anthropology faculty. That same year, she edited Dreaming: Anthropological and Psychological Interpretations, an anthology significant for presenting cross-cultural perspectives on dreaming. The collection featured cultural perspectives that challenge the typical Western conception of dreaming as a phenomenon existing completely separate from objective reality.

Tedlock examined how linguistic conventions mediate the performance and interpretation of dream experience. She explored how communications about dreams reveal patterns and variations around how different cultures perceive the role and significance of dreaming. For example, the Kʼicheʼ Maya people use the first-person pronoun "I" to narrate dreams with the understanding that this "I" does not necessarily relate to the conscious self of the dream teller. Likewise, the use of third person pronouns, particularly in relating negative dreams, communicates distance between the dream teller and the experience of the dream self.

Tedlock rejected the existence of any hard boundary between anthropologist and the peoples with whom they interact in the field. She advocated for narrative ethnography as a methodological innovation that honored and more accurately represented the intertwining, interdependent relationship between anthropologist and the subjects of their research.

From 1993 to 1997, Tedlock, with collaborator and husband Dennis Tedlock, edited American Anthropologist, the American Anthropological Association's flagship journal. In 1998, she became the chair of the Department of Anthropology at the University of Buffalo. Tedlock served on the Anthropology and Humanism advisory board.

== Publications ==
=== Books ===
Time and the Highland Maya (1992)

The Beautiful and the Dangerous: Encounters with the Zuni Indians (2001)

The Woman in the Shaman's Body: Reclaiming the Feminine in Religion and Medicine. (2005).

=== Co-authored or edited books ===
Teachings from the American Earth: Indian Religion and Philosophy (1975)

Dreaming: Anthropological and psychological interpretations. (1987)

=== Selected articles and book chapters ===
Tedlock, B. (1981). Quiché Maya dream interpretation. Ethos, 9(4), 313-330. doi.org/10.1525/eth.1981.9.4.02a00050

Tedlock, B. (1982). Sound texture and metaphor in Quiche Maya ritual language. Current Anthropology, 23(3), 269-272. doi.org/10.1086/202830

Tedlock, B. (1983). Zuni sacred theater. American Indian Quarterly, 93-110. doi:10.2307/1184258

Tedlock, B. (1984). The Beautiful and the Dangerous Zuni Ritual and Cosmology as an Aesthetic System. Conjunctions, (6), 246-265. jstor.org/stable/24515110

Tedlock, B. (1985). Hawks, meteorology and astronomy in Quiché-Maya agriculture. Archaeoastronomy, 8, 80.

Tedlock, B. (1986). Keeping the breath nearby. Anthropology and Humanism Quarterly, 11(4), 92-94. doi.org/10.1525/ahu.1986.11.4.92

Tedlock, B. (1987). An interpretive solution to the problem of humoral medicine in Latin America. Social science & medicine, 24(12), 1069-1083. doi.org/10.1016/0277-9536(87)90022-0

Tedlock, B. (1991). From participant observation to the observation of participation: The emergence of narrative ethnography. Journal of Anthropological Research, 47(1), 69-94. doi.org/10.1086/jar.47.1.3630581

Tedlock, B. (1992). The role of dreams and visionary narratives in Mayan cultural survival. Ethos, 20(4), 453-476. jstor.org/stable/640279

Tedlock, B. (1999). Maya Astronomy: what we know and how we know it. Archaeoastronomy, 14(1), 39.

Tedlock, B. (1999). Sharing and interpreting dreams in Amerindian nations. In D. Schulman & G.G. Stroumsa (Eds.), Dream cultures: Explorations in the comparative history of dreaming, (pp. 87–103.) Oxford University Press.

Tedlock, B. (2001). Divination as a way of knowing: Embodiment, visualisation, narrative, and interpretation. Folklore, 112(2), 189-197. doi.org/10.1080/00155870120082236

Tedlock, B. (2004). Narrative ethnography as social science discourse. Studies in Symbolic Interaction, 27, 23-32. doi.org/10.1016/S0163-2396(04)27004-1

Tedlock, B. (2004). The poetics and spirituality of dreaming: A Native American enactive theory. Dreaming, 14(2-3), 183–189. doi.org/10.1037/1053-0797.14.2-3.183

Tedlock, B. (2006). Toward a theory of divinatory practice. Anthropology of Consciousness, 17(2), 62-77. doi.org/10.1525/ac.2006.17.2.62

Tedlock, B. (2007). Bicultural dreaming as an intersubjective communicative process. Dreaming, 17(2), 57–72. doi.org/10.1037/1053-0797.17.2.57

Tedlock, B. (2009). Writing a storied life: Nomadism and double consciousness in transcultural ethnography. Etnofoor, 21(1), 21-38. jstor.org/stable/25758148

Tedlock, B. (2013). Braiding evocative with analytic autoethnography. In S.L. Holman Jones, T.E. Adams, & C. Ellis (Eds.), Handbook of autoethnography, 358-362.

=== Co-authored articles ===
Tedlock, B., & Tedlock, D. (1985). Text and textile: Language and technology in the arts of the Quiché Maya. Journal of Anthropological Research, 41(2), 121-146. doi.org/10.1086/jar.41.2.3630412

Tedlock, D., & Tedlock, B. (2002). The Sun, Moon, and Venus Among the Stars: Methods for Mapping Mayan Sidereal Space. Archaeoastronomy, 17.

== Awards ==
Society of Humanistic Anthropology Prize for Ethnographic Fiction (1986) (for "Keeping the Breath Nearby").

American Anthropological Association President's Award (1997) (with Dennis Tedlock)
