= Edimmu =

Type of demon in Sumerian religion

The edimmu, read incorrectly sometimes as ekimmu, were a type of utukku in the Mesopotamian religion of Sumer, Akkad, Assyria and Babylonia, similar in nature to the preta of the Hindu religions or the jiangshi of Chinese mythology. They were envisioned as the ghosts of those who were not buried properly. They were considered vengeful toward the living and might possess people if they did not respect certain taboos, such as the prohibition against eating ox meat. They were thought to cause disease and inspire criminal behavior in the living, but could sometimes be appeased by funeral repasts or libations. The edimmu were also thought to be completely or nearly incorporeal, "wind" spirits that sucked the life out of the susceptible and the sleeping (most commonly the young).
