= Ardat-lilî =

Mesopotamian demon

Ardat-lilî (Sumerian: ki-sikil-líl-lá, ki-sikil-ud-da-kar-ra) is a type of female Ancient Mesopotamian demon. The male equivalent of ardat-lilî is called eṭel-lilî (Sumerian: ĝuruš-líl-lá). Cuneiform sources describe an ardat-lilî as the ghost of a young woman who died without experiencing sexual fulfillment or marriage, and as a result attempts to seduce young men. Evidence for ardat-lilî as a "family" of demons rather than a single individual includes multiple, varying origin stories for different cases of ardat-lilî spirits. Members of the category of líl- demons, they were considered subjects of Pazuzu. A text placing one or more ardat-lilî in the entourage of the god Erra is also known. Incantations against ardat-lilî are attested as early as in the Old Babylonian period.

== Name ==
In addition to the standard form ardat-lilî, the variant wardat-lilîm appears in Old Babylonian sources. The name can be translated as "girl of the wind" or "phantom bride". The second half is derived from the Akkadian word lilû, a loanword from Sumerian LIL_{2}, which in turn depending on context can refer to winds, ghosts or demons. It is possible that through folk etymologies it additionally came to be connected with Akkadian lilâtu, "night".

Ardat-lilî was also known under the Sumerian term kisikillilla or kisikillillaenna. However, Markham J. Geller notes that in bilingual incantations kisikillilla corresponds to a different demon, lilītu, while ardat-lilî is translated to Sumerian kisikil-uddakarra, "maiden who the storm demon chose". However, this convention is not followed in an Old Babylonian lexical list, where kisikil uddakarra is given as the Sumerian name of a different demon, pāšittum (epithet of Lamashtu). (Note: This name is commonly translated as "exterminator" or "obliterating one" due to being most likely derived from the Akkadian verb pašāṭum, "to erase". In another lexical list its Sumerian equivalent is KA-im-ma.) Despite phonetic similarities, the theonym Kilili is not related to kisikillila. (Note: While the being designated by this name could be regarded as a demon, she belonged to the category of demonic animals, possibly representing a demonized owl.)

== Characterization ==
While demons were typically less well defined than deities in Mesopotamian beliefs, Daniel Schwemer stresses that in the case of ardat-lilî it is nonetheless possible to speak of a "detailed, standardized set of motifs". Lorenzo Verderame notes that ardat-lilî was believed to have an "appealing" appearance, in contrast with other demons, who could be described as faceless, "ever-changing" (uttakkarū) or "strange" (nakru) They belonged to a class of supernatural beings designated by the root lil-. It also included figures such as eṭel-lilî ("phantom bridegroom"), lilītu ("female phantom"), lilû ("male phantom") and possibly naššuqītu ("phantom kisser"). Additionally, Pazuzu was referred to as the king of the lil-. (Note: Frans Wiggermann argues this likely indicates Lamashtu was also regarded as a lil, as Pazuzu was believed to have power over her. However, Eric Schmidtchen notes it can be argued that in standardized lists of demons they are divided in three groups, utukku, lil and KAMAD. The last of them is distinct from the lil and encompasses Lamashtu and related figures like aḫḫazu and labāṣu.)

The lil- demons were believed to be the ghosts of young people who died sexually unfulfilled. Incantations focused on ardat-lilî accordingly describe them as beings who has never had sex, never got married and as a result had no family. One incantation states that while still alive, an ardat-lilî was unable to partake in a festival (isinnu) alongside other girls, which according to Julia Krul is most likely an allusion to a specific unidentified event which was focused on young women, as opposed to a general reference to religious celebrations. Stories of individual ardat-lilî include varying details such as “young girl who never had a husband”, “young girl who was snatched away from a husband, snatched away from a child”, “young woman who was never impregnated”, and “young girl who was driven from her father-in-law’s house” (Scurlock & Anderson, page 273).

Ardat-lilî were believed to typically target young men, acting as a demonic seductress due to their grief and desolation. Their role can be compared to that of a succubus. In a number of cases, exorcism formulas prescribe a mock marriage as a solution to problems caused by them.

No evidence exists for any association between ardat-lilî and children.

== Attestations ==
=== Sumerian and Akkadian literature ===
==== Epic of Gilgamesh ====
Under the Sumerian term kisikillila, ardat-lilî appears in the composition Gilgamesh, Enkidu and the Netherworld. It belonged to the curriculum of Old Babylonian scribal schools, and as a result is well documented in the archeological record, with seventy four copies recovered as of 2014. Kisikillila is described as one of the three beings Gilgamesh has to drive away from the ḫalub tree planted by Inanna. While part of the narrative was later translated into Akkadian and incorporated into the Epic of Gilgamesh, the section dealing with the ḫalub tree was not, possibly due to thematically overlapping with the myth of the cedar forest. The term ki-sikil-lil-la-ke is commonly translated as phantom maid, demon-maiden, demon-girl or a similar variation.

==== Disease ====
References to ardat-lilî have been identified in medical incantations. An illness called the "hand of ardat-lilî" (qāt ardat lilî) is known from multiple sources. In the Assur Medical Catalogue, it is described as the cause of la’bu, which has been variously interpreted as a skin disease, a type of fever, psychiatric and neurological disorders, or as a reference to an unidentified bodily fluid.

==== Astrology ====
An astrological text from Sultantepe (STT ii, 300) indicates that the twelfth day of the month was believed to be particularly suitable for performing rituals meant to ward off ardat-lilî.

==== Disputed or disproved examples ====
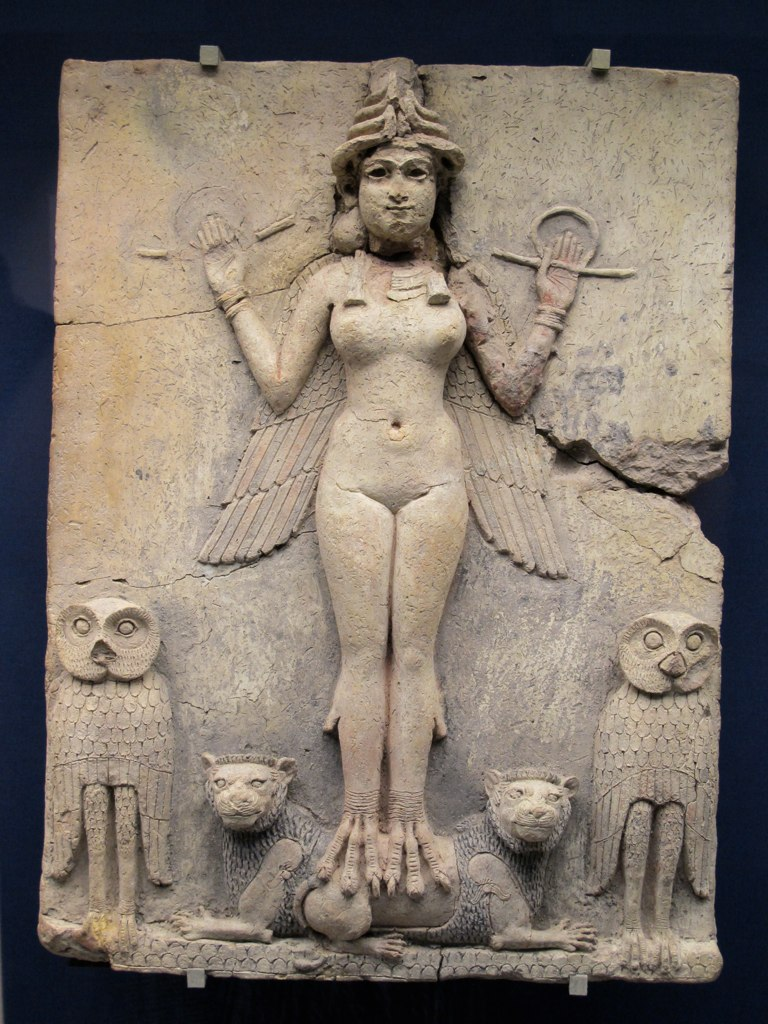
The Burney Relief.

In the past identification of the figure depicted on the Burney Relief as an ardat-lilî or lilītu has been proposed, but today it is considered implausible as it is unlikely a figure perceived negatively would be represented as a cultic image. In ancient Mesopotamia demons were not an object of cult, and it was believed they are incapable of heeding prayers of humans the way gods were supposed to. With the exception of first millennium BCE exorcist rituals which required the preparation of figures of demons such as Lamashtu, utukku or rābiṣu, there is no evidence that demons known from exorcistic literature were depicted in Mesopotamian art. Such figures would generally be destroyed as a part of the ceremony.

While it has been suggested that a passage in the Old Babylonian hymn to Ishtar preserved on the tablet AO 6035 might refer to the eponymous deity as the mistress of ardat-lilî or another similarly named demon, Michael P. Streck and Nathan Wasserman conclude that the word līlu, "evening", is meant instead.

=== Magical Corpus ===
Incantations dealing with ardat-lilî were already known in the Old Babylonian period. The standard texts are bilingual, with Sumerian and Akkadian versions of the same formula listed side by side.

Ardat-lilî appears alongside lilû and lilītu in an incantation targeting mimma lemnu, "any evil", a personification of a formula referring to any possible cause of harm which has befallen a person. Specific well known demons and illnesses are singled out as possible sources, but the cause ultimately remains undefined. The formula was originally written in the seventh century by Nabû-kabti-aḫḫēšu, an exorcist from the temple of Ashur in Assur. Later copies have been discovered during excavations of Uruk and Babylon as well.

==== Ardat-lilî incantations ====
Ardat-lilî incantations included an explanation on their nature and origins. The ghosts, while alive, didn't celebrate with girls their age, had no husband, never had sex and were despised for not giving birth to a child. One of the Old Babylonian incantations (YOS 11, 92) places one or more ardat-lilî in the entourage of Erra. Some incantations appear during the Hellenistic period.

Ardat-lilî is also mentioned in incantations from the series Udug Hul. Markham J. Geller notes there is a degree of textual overlap between this corpus and independent ardat-lilî incantations. Ardat-lilî appears for example in a formula meant to prevent various demons from approaching their victims on tablet 6. A different ardat-lilî is described as having been “mistreated by the ‘hand’ of Ishtar”.

Geller interprets tablet 5 to be a rare case of an ardat-lilî being a victim of another demon, which causes her to be placed under the protection of Ishtar. A re-examination of the tablet, and identification of Neo-Assyrian manuscripts translating the passage, identify the evil Utukku demon having seized "him", the patient, and not "her", the ardat-lilî. The ardat-lilî features as a vehicle, as she has brought an evil Utukku back into civilization with her. Afterwards the utukku attacks the patient, which enrages Ištar, who prompts the oath that banished the utukku from the patient.

== See also ==
- Lilu (mythology)
- Lamashtu
- Lilith
- Incubus
- Succubus
