= Rabisu =

Akkadian mythological spirits

In Akkadian mythology the Rabisu ("the lurker"; Sumerian 𒉺𒁽 Maškim, "deputy, attorney"), or possibly Rabasa, are vampiric spirits, daimons, or demons. The Rabisu are associated in mythology with the Curse of Akkad. A consistent translation of "Rabisu" is "Lingerers". The Rabisu, whether intending malicious actions or not, linger around those who have been found wayward or to be rewarded by the deity Enlil.

== Description ==
The spirit identified by the Akkadians as "Rabisu" is not an inherently evil spirit. Despite the Hebrew Bible referring to demons as evil by nature, the demonology expressed by the Akkadians suggests that Rabisu, rather than being an entity of evil, was "a neutral being that is nothing other than a current of wind dispatched by the deities to perform certain duties". Rather, the Rabisu was a spirit sent out to correct the transgressions committed by humans.

When one refers to the spirit of the Rabisu as an evil entity (Evil Rabisu) it may be better interpreted as reference to malicious action performed by the Rabisu in response to the wayward actions of an afflicted human. That is, the malicious event does not reflect the Rabisu spirit as a whole.

== In Mesopotamian mythology ==
The Sumerian and Akkadian deity Enlil, a major god of the earth and sky, is the sender of the "windy beings" known as Rabisu. The Rabisu, rather than acting as predatory demons with their own malicious will, were more like links between the divine beings of Heaven and the Earth. In mythology, Enlil sent the spirit of the Rabisu as a sort of messenger. Whether the message entailed good or bad things for the receiver was not a reflection upon the Rabisu but rather the consequence of human actions, which themselves were of different moral character.

The Rabisu, though believed to hold no moral implications, were often opposed by hero figures. In Sumerian texts, the hero is named Hendursanga, roughly translated as "Watchman of the Night." Other translations include "Isums" which is interpretated as "Herald of the Gods, Watchman of the Streets" (University of Chicago Press 3).

The Rabisu is also listed in the rituals of Šurpu which have to do with burning, such as the symbolic burning of witches. The Šurpu ritual allows the banishment of Rabisu described as "a demon that springs unawares on its victims".

=== The Curse of Akkad ===
The Curse of Akkad, also known as The Curse of Agade, is a story told by Sumerians during the Third Dynasty of Ur (2047-1750BCE) about the Akkadian king Naram-Sin who was the grandson and successor of Sargon the Great. Sometimes the Curse is described as Naram-Sin's fight with Enlil. Naram-Sin had grown discontent with himself and blamed the gods for not providing relief from his sorrows. Naram-Sin took up arms against Enlil who, in turn, sent the Rabisu to correct Naram-Sin's transgressions. The story ends with the complete destruction of the city of Akkad, Enlil triumphing over the earthly human domain. This story can be read in the context of the Rabisu as the enforcers of divine will.

==== Myth of Ubar ====
The story of the Curse of Akkad is similar to a myth of the "lost city" of Ubar, sometimes referred to as "Atlantis of the Sands", located farther to the south in southeastern Oman. The Rabisu were noted to operate as a flock or unit, as opposed to individual spirits. It was believed that Enlil would send "flocks" of Rabisu in the form of storms of wind, sometimes carrying dust or sand storms.

In one tablet from the Akkadian Empire, the author records that "A disfavorable storm arose against the land. It disturbed the people of the upper and lower territory .. the awful storm, the (great) storm, that will neither be returned to the steppe-land, nor look back... Cities offer no protection, for such beings borne on the wind are able to penetrate the urban landscape. They pursue people. They invade dwellings and buildings." This story is nearly identical to a myth that refers to Ubar in which the gods, having grown angry with the residents of Ubar, struck it down in a great storm in which sand entirely engulfed the city and all its people.

== In the Bible ==
The book The Religion of Babylonia and Assyria by Theophilus Pinches describes the Rabisu as being "the seizer": a spirit that lies in wait "to pounce upon his prey".

In the Bible, Gen 4:6–7 reads:

The Lord said to Cain, "Why are you angry, and why has your countenance fallen? If you do well, will you not be accepted? And if you do not do well, sin is lurking at the door; its desire is for you, but you must master it."

The New American Bible translates this as:

So the LORD said to Cain: "Why are you so resentful and crestfallen? If you do well, you can hold up your head; but if not, sin is a demon lurking at the door: his urge is toward you, yet you can be his master."

It adds as a footnote:

Demon lurking: in Hebrew, robes, literally "croucher," is used here, like the similar Akkadian term rabisu, to designate a certain kind of evil spirit.

It is possible that this displays a continued tradition in the emerging culture of the Hebrews.

== In popular culture ==
In the 1977 grimoire Simon Necronomicon by Peter Levenda, which draws upon a blend of real myths including Sumerian and fictional creations, Rabisu are described as ancient demons. It talks about the god Marduk who battled Tiamat, Kingu, and Azag-Thoth. In the book, among the fifty Names of Marduk is the name Nariluggaldimmerankia, which is the sixth. Nariluggaldimmerankia is said to be the sub-commander of wind demons. He is described as the foe of Rabisu and all maskim who haunt humans. Marduk's seventh name, Asaruludu, is said to have the power using his sacred word Banmaskim to banish all Maškim (a.k.a. Rabisu).

Myths of the Rabiru as lingerers or lurkers may have inspired the title of The Lurker at the Threshold, a horror novel by August Derleth.

In 2021, Supermassive Games released House of Ashes, an interactive drama horror video game set during the invasion of Iraq in 2003. A squad of American Marines find themselves trapped in an ancient Mesopotamian temple after a raid on a local village in search of weapons goes awry. Concurrently, bat-like vampiric creatures awaken from their millennia-long slumber to roam the temple and stalk and terrorize their newfound human prey.

== Scholarship ==
The idea of the Rabisu (Akkadian) or Robes (Hebrew) as evil spirits first began in a series of books published in 1903–1904 by Assyriologist Reginald Campbell Thompson. Thompson portrayed the Rabisu as an evil spirit in the seventeenth volume of Cuneiform Texts from Babylonian Tablets and the two-volume series Devils and Evil Spirits of Babylonia. This caused substantive debate and is still contested by scholars today.

In 1903, the claim that the Rabisu was an evil, demonic spirit was contested by Hans Duhm in Die bösen Geister im Alten Testament in which he and Assyriologist Charles-Francois Jean were able to compare Hebrew texts to Akkadian demonology to attest that the Rabisu was not a predatory being. In this literature, despite the assertion that the Rabisu was not evil, the entity was still referred to as a "demon" in some classifications. Some have stuck to this notion without question. Duhm's assertion has also been challenged from multiple angles. Others who interpreted the Hebrew Bible also reached a separate conclusion that Rovetz ("lurking, crouching" in Hebrew) is not the same entity or in some cases not even the same religion as the spirit of the Rabisu (Akkadian Demon).

One of the main reasons people often consider the Rabisu intrinsically evil is because of modern connotations of the word "demon". In ancient theology, a daimon had both an intrinsically evil and intrinsically good dichotomy; in vernacular usage, however, a "demon" is often assumed to be evil or malicious. It is also understood by modern translation that the Rabisu did not act without divine authority. That is, unless Enlil and his heavenly counsel specifically told or commanded the Rabisu to do something, they would not. Rather, they remained neutral spirits existing between the planes of heaven and earth.
