= Gallu =

Great demon in Mesopotamian mythology

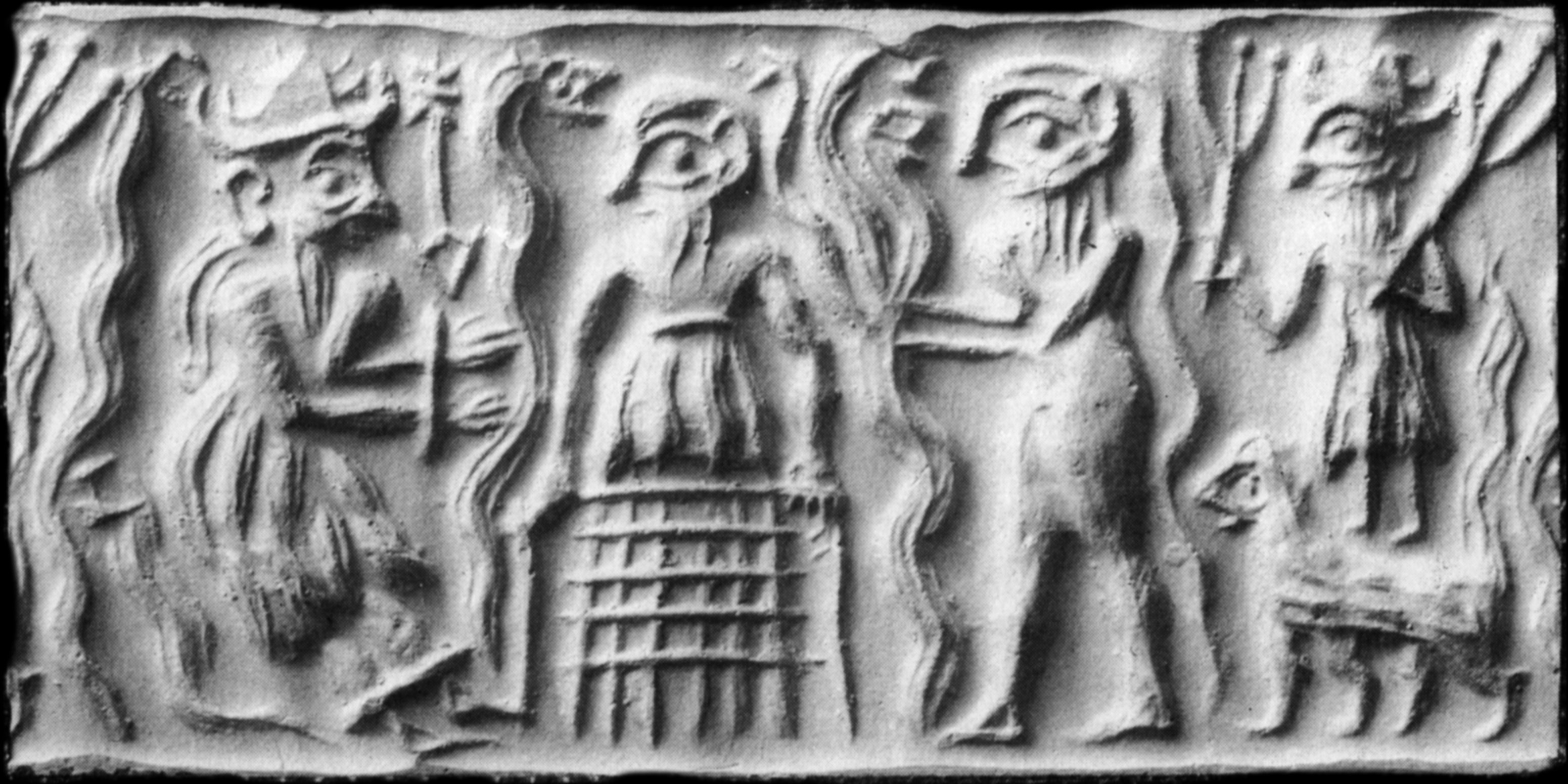
A cylinder seal of the god Dumuzid being tortured in the ancient Mesopotamian underworld by gallas

In Sumerian and ancient Mesopotamian religion, gallûs (also called gallas; Akkadian gallû < Sumerian gal.lu) were demons or devils of the ancient Mesopotamian Underworld.

== Role in mythology ==
Gallu demons hauled unfortunate victims off to the underworld. They were one of seven devils (or "the offspring of hell") of Babylonian theology that could be appeased by the sacrifice of a lamb at their altars.

The goddess Inanna was pursued by gallu demons after being escorted from the Underworld by Galatura and Kuryara. In the Descent, it is stated that said demons

know no food, know no drink, eat no flour offering, drink no libation. They never enjoy the pleasures of marital embrace, never have any sweet children to kiss. They snatch the son from a man’s knee. They make the bride leave the house of her father in law.

== Other uses ==
The word gallu may also refer to a human adversary, one that is dangerous and implacable.

== See also ==
- Sumerian religion
- Asag
- Ḫulbazizi
- Udug
- Gello
- Ghoul
