= Udug =

Class of demons in ancient Mesopotamian mythology

The udug (Sumerian: 𒌜), later known in Akkadian as the utukku, were an ambiguous class of demons from ancient Mesopotamian mythology found in the literature of Sumer, Akkad, Assyria and Babylonia. They were born in the underworld (Kur), as a beings different from the dingir (Anu-nna-Ki and Igigi), and they were generally malicious, even if a member of demons (Pazuzu) was willing to clash both with other demons and with the gods, even if he is described as a presence hostile to humans. The word is generally ambiguous and is sometimes used to refer to demons as a whole rather than a specific kind of demon. No visual representations of the udug have yet been identified, but descriptions of it ascribe to it features often given to other ancient Mesopotamian demons: a dark shadow, absence of light surrounding it, poison, and a deafening voice. The surviving ancient Mesopotamian texts giving instructions for exorcizing the evil udug are known as the Udug Hul texts. These texts emphasize the evil udug's role in causing disease and the exorcist's role in curing the disease.

== Appearance ==
Only a few descriptions of the udug are known and, according to Gina Konstantopoulos, no pictorial or visual representations of them have ever been identified. According to Tally Ornan, however, some Mesopotamian cylinder seals show a figure carrying a scepter alongside the benevolent guard demoness Lama, which may be identified as the udug. F. A. M. Wiggerman has argued that images of Lama and the udug were frequently used to guard doorways.

In a bilingual incantation written in both Sumerian and Akkadian, the god Asalluḫi describes the "evil udug" to his father Enki:

O my father, the evil udug [udug hul], its appearance is malignant and its stature towering,
Although it is not a god (dingir) its clamour is great and its radiance [melam] immense,
It is dark, its shadow is pitch black and there is no light within its body,
It always hides, taking refuge, [it] does not stand proudly,
Its claws drip with bile, it leaves poison in its wake,
Its belt is not released, his arms enclose,
It fills the target of his anger with tears, in all lands, [its] battle cry cannot be restrained.

This description mostly glosses over what the udug actually looks like, instead focusing more on its fearsome supernatural abilities. All the characteristics ascribed to the "evil udug" here are common features that are frequently attributed to all different kinds of ancient Mesopotamian demons: a dark shadow, absence of light surrounding it, poison, and a deafening voice. Other descriptions of the udug are not consistent with this one and often contradict it. Konstantopoulos notes that "the udug is defined by what it is not: the demon is nameless and formless, even in its early appearances." An incantation from the Old Babylonian Period (c. 1830 – c. 1531 BC) defines the udug as "the one who, from the beginning, was not called by name... the one who never appeared with a form." One of the udug could be Hanbi. In Sumerian and Akkadian mythology (and Mesopotamian mythology in general) Hanbi or Hanpa (more commonly known in western text) was the god of evil, god of all evil forces and the father of Pazuzu. Aside from his relationship with Pazuzu, very little is known of this figure.

== List of udugs ==
- Akhkhazu/Dimme-Kurr
- Alû (Sumerian shadow demon without face)
- Ardat-lilî (Sumerian shadow demon partly woman, partly dog and partly scorpion, devourer of children)
- Hanbi (Sumerian lord of the shadow demon called udug)
- Labasù (Sumerian shadow demon disease bearer)
- Mimma Lemnu (Sumerian name used for a demon and for a ritual)
- Mukīl rēš lemutti (Sumerian shadow demon capable of possessing people's bodies and omen of misfortune)
- Namtar (Sumerian shadow demon ally with the dingir of the afterlife Ereshkigal)
- Pazuzu (Sumerian king shadow demon of the wind)
- Vardat Lilitu (Sumerian vampire shadow demon, devourer of children-the Babylonians modified her origin)

== Identity ==
Of all Mesopotamian demons, the udug is the least clearly defined. The word originally did not connote whether the demon in question was good or evil. In one of the two Gudea cylinders, King Gudea of Lagash (ruled c. 2144–2124 BCE) asks a goddess to send a "good udug" to protect him and a lama to guide him. Surviving ancient Mesopotamian texts giving instructions for performing exorcisms frequently invoke the "good udug" to provide protection or other aid as the exorcism is being performed. Mesopotamian magical texts, however, also mention a specific "evil udug" as well as plural "udugs", who are also referred to as evil. The phrase for "evil udug" is Udug Hul in Sumerian and Utukkū Lemnutū in Akkadian. The evil udug is often a vector for physical and mental illnesses.

The word udug by itself without a qualifier usually connotes the evil udug. Exorcism texts sometimes invoke the "good udug" against the "evil udug". A text from the Old Babylonian Period (c. 1830 – c. 1531 BCE) requests, "May the evil udug and the evil galla stand aside. May the good udug and good galla be present." Sometimes the word udug does not even refer to a specific demon, but rather functions as an umbrella term for all the different demons in Mesopotamian demonology. On account of the udug's capacity for both good and ill, Graham Cunningham argues that "the term daimon seems preferable" over the term "demon", which is the one normally used to describe it.

== Udug hul incantations ==
The canon of exorcism of the evil udug is known as udug-ḫul, the Akkadian expansion of which (known in Akkadian as utukkū lemnūtu) is in sixteen tablets. The tradition of Udug Hul incantations spans the entirety of ancient Mesopotamian history; they are among the earliest texts known written in Sumerian in the third millennium BCE, as well as among the last Mesopotamian texts of late antiquity, written in cuneiform with Greek transliterations. The udug-ḫul incantations were originally unilingual and written in Sumerian, but these earliest versions were later converted into bilingual texts written in both Sumerian and Akkadian. They were also expanded with additions written only in Akkadian with no Sumerian precursors. The udug-ḫul incantations emphasize the role of the evil udug as the cause of sickness and focus primarily on attempting to drive out the evil udug to cure the illness. They frequently contain references to Mesopotamian mythology, such as the myth of Inanna's Descent into the Underworld.

== Bibliography ==
- Black, Jeremy; Green, Anthony (1992), Gods, Demons and Symbols of Ancient Mesopotamia: An Illustrated Dictionary, Austin, Texas: University of Texas Press, ISBN 978-0292707948
- Cunningham, Graham (2007) [1997], Deliver Me from Evil: Mesopotamian Incantations, 2500-1500 BC, Studia Pohl: Series Maior, vol. 17, Rome, Italy: Etrice Pontificio Instituto Biblico, ISBN 978-88-7653-608-3
- Geller, Markham J. (2016), Healing Magic and Evil Demons: Canonical Udug-hul Incantations, Berlin, Germany: Walter de Gruyter, ISBN 978-1-5015-0015-2
- Konstantopoulos, Gina (2017), "Shifting Alignments: The Dichotomy of Benevolent and Malevolent Demons in Mesopotamia", in Bhayro, Siam; Rider, Catharine (eds.), Demons and Illness from Antiquity to the Early-Modern Period, Leiden, The Netherlands and Boston, Massachusetts: Koninklijke Brill, pp. 19–38, ISBN 978-90-04-33854-8
- Ornan, Tally (2005), The Triumph of the Symbol: Pictorial Representation of Deities in Mesopotamia and the Biblical Image Ban, Orbus Biblical et Orientalis, vol. 213, Fribourg, Switzerland: Academic Press Fribourg and Vandenhoek & Ruprecht Gottingen, ISBN 978-3-7278-1519-5
- Romis, Sara (2018), "A Demonic Servant in Riv Papa's Household: Demons as Subjects in the Mesopotamian Talmud", in Herman, Geoffrey; Rubenstein, Jeffrey L. (eds.), The Aggada of the Bavli and Its Cultural World, Providence, Rhode Island: Brown Judaic Studies, ISBN 978-194-652710-3
- Bane, Theresa (2014-01-10). Encyclopedia of Demons in World Religions and Cultures. McFarland. p. 157. ISBN 978-0-7864-8894-0.
- Sumerian Deities". Sarissa.org. Archived from the original on 2010-12-20. Retrieved 2010-09-12.
- Simon, Ed (2022-02-22). "Chapter 1". Pandemonium: A Visual History of Demonology. Abrams. ISBN 978-1-64700-389-0.

Lambert, Wilfred George (1970). "Inscribed Pazuzu Heads from Babylon". Forschungen und Berichte. 12: 41–T4. doi:10.2307/3880639. JSTOR 3880639. Wiggermann, p. 372. Wiggermann, p. 373. Maiden 2018, p. 109. Maiden 2018, p. 99. Maiden 2018, p. 100. Heeßel 2011, p. 358. Heeßel 2011, p. 359. Wiggermann, p. 374. Heeßel 2011, p. 361. Wiggermann 2007. "Pendant with the head of Pazuzu". www.metmuseum.org. Retrieved 2022-05-06. Heeßel 2011, p. 362. Mesopotamian Medicine and Magic 2019, p. 273. Maiden 2018, p. 106. Mesopotamian Medicine and Magic 2019, p. 272. Maiden 2018, p. 88. Niederreiter 2018. Noegel 2018. Horowitz, Wayne (2010). A Woman of Valor: Jerusalem Ancient Near Eastern Studies in Honor of Joan Goodnick Westenholz. CSIC Press. p. 66. ISBN 978-8400091330. Maiden 2018, p. 87. Mesopotamian Medicine and Magic 2019, p. 274. El-Kilany 2017, p. 1. El-Kilany 2017, p. 2. Mesopotamian Medicine and Magic 2019, p. 284. El-Kilany 2017, p. 3. Mesopotamian Medicine and Magic 2019, p. 285. Heeßel 2011, p. 366. "Statuette of the demon Pazuzu with an inscription". Louvre website. Archived from the original on 2009-06-28. Retrieved 2010-05-18. "Pazuzu". World History Encyclopedia. Retrieved 2021-11-24. Mesopotamian Medicine and Magic 2019, p. 275. Mesopotamian Medicine and Magic 2019, p. 276. Mesopotamian Medicine and Magic 2019, p. 277. Guiley, Rosemary (2009). The Encyclopedia of Demons and Demonology. Infobase Publishing. p. 197. ISBN 978-1-4381-3191-7.Verderame, Lorenzo (2020). 'Evil from an Ancient Past and the Archaeology of the Beyond: An Analysis of the Movies The Exorcist (1973) and The Evil Dead (1981)', in L. Verderame and A. Garcia-Ventura (eds) Receptions of the Ancient Near East in Popular Culture and Beyond. Lockwood Press. pp. 159–179. ISBN 978-1-948488-24-2. Lambert, Wilfred G. (1980), "Kilili", Reallexikon der Assyriologie, retrieved 2022-05-17 Beaulieu, Paul-Alain (2003). The pantheon of Uruk during the neo-Babylonian period. Leiden Boston: Brill STYX. ISBN 978-90-04-13024-1. OCLC 51944564. Finkel, Irving L. (2021). The first ghosts : most ancient of legacies. London. ISBN 978-1-5293-0326-1. OCLC 1090201481. Wiggermann, Frans (2011-01-01). "The Mesopotamian Pandemonium". SMSR 77/2. Retrieved 2022-05-17. Wiggermann, Frans (2007). "Some Demons of Time and their Functions in Mesopotamian Iconography". In Groneberg, Brigitte; Spieckermann, Hermann (eds.). Beihefte zur Zeitschrift für die alttestamentliche Wissenschaft. Berlin, New York: Walter de Gruyter. pp. 102–116. doi:10.1515/9783110204155.1.102. ISBN 978-3-11-019463-0. ISSN 0934-2575. This name is commonly translated as "exterminator" or "obliterating one" due to being most likely derived from the Akkadian verb pašāṭum, "to erase".[8] In another lexical list its Sumerian equivalent is KA-im-ma.[9] While the being designated by this name could be regarded as a demon, she belonged to the category of demonic animals, possibly representing a demonized owl.[11] Frans Wiggermann argues this likely indicates Lamashtu was also regarded as a lil, as Pazuzu was believed to have power over her.[16] However, Eric Schmidtchen notes it can be argued that in standardized lists of demons they are divided in three groups, utukku, lil and KAMAD.[17] The last of them is distinct from the lil and encompasses Lamashtu and related figures like aḫḫazu and labāṣu.[18]
