= Lilu (mythology) =

Masculine Akkadian word for evil spirits

A lilu or lilû (Sumerian: líl-lá(-en-na), lú-líl-lá) is the masculine Akkadian word for a spirit or demon. A female lilû was called a lilītu (munus-líl-lá, ki-sikil-líl-lá(en-na), ᵈdim(-me)-gi₆) (and her adolescent counterpart ardat-lilî). Together, these were a class of demon that the ancient Mesopotamians believed emerged from the unfulfilled spirits of adults/adolescents who died before marriage or conceiving children. "Lilû" and its root word lil- also show wider meanings linked to spirits, desolation, and wild creatures.

== History ==
Scurlock and Andersen (2005) attribute the origin of "the lilû class of demons" (pg. 434) to treatment of neurological and mental disorders as well as STDs such as syphilis (pg. 95). An abundance of cuneiform text characterizes the lilû as "teenage demons". (pg. 273). As these demons were thought to afflict members of the opposite sex, lilû were often held responsible for illnesses afflicting girls (pg. 434). Scurlock and Andersen suggest an association with Ištar, although not necessarily positively, as one ardat-lilî was described as "mistreated by the hand of Ištar" (pg. 434, pg.273).

=== Sumerian and Akkadian literature ===
==== Sumerian King List ====
In the Sumerian King List the father of Gilgamesh is said to be a lilu.

==== 'Spirit in the tree' in the Gilgamesh cycle ====
Tablet XII, dated c. 600 BCE, is a later Assyrian Akkadian translation of the latter part of the Sumerian Epic of Gilgamesh. It describes a 'spirit in the tree' referred to a ki-sikil-lil-la-ke. In modern scholarship, ki-sikil-lil-la-ke is understood as the Sumerian equivalent of the Akkadian ardat lilî, and accepted translations include phantom maid, demon-maiden and demon-girl. A connection between the Gilgamesh ki-sikil-lil-la-ke and the Jewish Lilith was rejected on textual grounds by Sergio Ribichini (1978).

The ki-sikil-lil-la-ke is associated with a serpent and a zu bird. (Note: Kramer translates the zu as "owl", but most often it is translated as "eagle", "vulture", or "bird of prey".) In Gilgamesh, Enkidu, and the Netherworld, a huluppu tree grows in Inanna's garden in Uruk, whose wood she plans to use to build a new throne. After ten years of growth, she comes to harvest it and finds a serpent living at its base, a Zu bird raising young in its crown, and that a ki-sikil-lil-la-ke made a house in its trunk. Gilgamesh is said to have killed the snake, and then the zu bird flew away to the mountains with its young, while the ki-sikil-lil-la-ke fearfully destroys its house and runs for the forest.

==== Astrology ====
BRM 4 19

Spells to remove lilu and ardat-lili:

rev. 20′–21′: On Month 2 Day 12, in order to remove lilû and ardat lilî demons; make (spells/rituals), and it will be well. 2! 12 7 6 Scales (micro-Libra) of Stars (Pleiades in Taurus) is the distance). 22′–23′: On Month 4 Day 12, in order to remove lilû and ardat lilî demons; make (spells/rituals), and it will be well. 4 12 9 6 Pabilsag (micro-Sagittarius) [of] Crab (Cancer) is the distance).

BRM 4 20 The tablet from Uruk, adapts older astrological magic to the newly discovered zodiac, presenting a novel approach to magical rituals. It presents specific timings for spells to be performed, amongst them ones that deal with the lilu and ardat-lili.

(Spells/rituals for) the lilû demon; with the Stars (Pleiades in (micro)-Taurus) or with the Scales ((micro)-Libra)

(Spells/rituals for) the ardat lilî demon; with the Stars (Pleiades in (micro)-Taurus), or with the Twins ((micro)-Gemini), or with Pabilsag ((micro)-Sagittarius).

(Spells/rituals for) lilû (and) ardat lilî demons; with Pabilsag ((micro)-Sagittarius).

Tablet STT ii, 300

12–13: If on Month 4 …; on Day 12, in order to remove lilû (and) ardat lilî demons; … make (spells/rituals), and it will be well. 9–11: If on Month [10] …; on Day 12, ( for) 'cutting off the breath' and in order to remove lilû (and) ardat lilî demons; make (spells/rituals), and it will be well …

Tablet SpTU v, 243

3–4: [(Spells/rituals for) lilû and] ardat lilî demons; with … (or) with the Stars (Pleiades in (micro)-Taurus). 4′–5′: (Spells/rituals for) sorcery, 'cutting off the breath,' lilû and ardat lilî demons; with Pabilsag ((micro)-Sagittarius).

=== Magical Corpus ===
In Akkadian literature hlilu occurs. In Sumerian literature lili occurs. Dating of specific Akkadian, Sumerian, and Babylonian texts mentioning lilu (masculine), lilitu (female) and ardat-lili (female) are haphazard. In older scholarship, such as R. Campbell Thompson's The Devils and Evil Spirits of Babylonia (1904), specific text references are rarely given. An exception is K156 which mentions an ardat lili. Heinrich Zimmern (1917) tentatively identified vardat lilitu KAT3, 459 as paramour of lilu.

==== Anti-Witchcraft Corpus ====
Texts of Group Eight: CEREMONIAL RITUALS FOR UNDOING WITCHCRAFT

Sumerian Incantations Against a Demonic Witch

1 The evil one (variant: Evil storm), evil eye, child of destruction,

[Akk.:] The lilītum-demon, whose e[ye is evil, … ],

2 roaming with witchcraft (and) magic, she is flitting about like a male lil-demon.

[Akk.:] witchcraft (and) magic are roa[ming, … ].

Ghosts, Gods and Witches

108 'hand-of-a-human', the lilû-demon, the lilītu-demon, [the ardat-lilî-demon], 208 or the lilû-demon, or the lilītu-demon, or the ardat lilî-demon

A collection of Anti-Witchcraft Rites Closely Related to Maqlû

35 [The lilû-demon, the lilītu-demon (and) the ardat lilî-demon] you have caused to seize me. 36 [May the lilû-demon, the lilītu-demon (and) the ardat lilî-demon] seize you!

A parallel to Maqlû II 52-58

14" or the aḫḫ[āzu-demon], [or the lilû-demon, or the lilītu-demon, or]

15" the ardat-[lilî-demon], [or]

16" the liʾb[u]-disease [of the mountain], [or bennu-epilepsy, the semen of]

17" Šulpa[ea, ...]

==== Maqlû ====
Tablet I

137 Lamaštu, labāṣu (disease), ahhāzu-jaundice,

138 lilû, lilītu, ardat-lilî,

139 And any evil that seizes mankind,

140 Melt, dissolve, drip ever away!

Tablet II

51 Who have given me over to a dead man, who have made me experience hardship

52 Be it an evil utukku-demon, be it an evil alû-demon,

53 Be it an evil ghost, be it an evil (demonic) constable,

54 Be it an evil god, be it an evil lurker-demon,

55 Be it Lamaštu, be it labāṣu (disease), be it ahhāzu-jaundice,

56 Be it lilû, be it lilītu, be it ardat-lilî,

61 Be it Hand-of-a-ghost-disease, be it Hand-[of-a-curse]-disease,

62 Be it Hand-of-mankind-disease, be it young Lamaštu, the daughter of Anu

Tablet V

67 lilû, lilītu, (and) ardat-lilî you have caused to seize me: May lilû, lilītu, (and) ardat-lilî seize you.

==== Utukkū Lemnūtu (Udug-Hul) ====
The incantations, known in Sumerian as Udug-Hul and in Akkadian as Utukkū Lemnūtu were used to treat patients from illnesses caused by evil demons. The lilu, lilitu and ardat-lili are mentioned across most tablets, frequently together with Lamashtu and other demons. The text is translated by Markham J. Geller, whose translation of lilitu and ardat-lili varies, as he sometimes prefers to translate them as Lilith.

The lil-demons are mentioned on Tablets: 1 (lines 62, 79-81), 2 (65), 3 (114, 119, 140), 4 (131), 5 (ardat-lili incantation), 6 (50-51, 59-60), 9 (87), 10 (17-19, 32-34, 60-62), 11 (4, 16), 13-15 (138, 179, 223), and 16 (170).

== Relationship to Hebrew Lilith and lilin ==
Judit M. Blair wrote a thesis on the relation of the Akkadian word lilu, or its cognates, to the Hebrew word lilith in Isaiah 34:14, which is thought to be a night bird. The Babylonian concept of lilu may be more strongly related to the later Talmudic concept of Lilith (female) and lilin (male); Hebrew: לילין). In Jewish mythology, Lilin is a term for night spirits. In the Syriac Apocalypse of Baruch, lilin come from the desert (Note: R. H. Charles translation) and they are similar to shedim.

== See also ==
- Ahhazu
- Ardat-lilî
- Labasu
- Lamashtu
- Lilith
- Lilin
- Nocnitsa
- Incubus
- Succubus
