= Akkadian literature =

Mesopotamian writings, 23rd–6th century BC

Akkadian literature is the ancient literature written in the East Semitic Akkadian language (Assyrian and Babylonian dialects) in Mesopotamia (Akkad, Assyria, and Babylonia) during the period spanning the Middle Bronze Age to the Iron Age (roughly the 25th to 4th centuries BC).

Drawing on the traditions of Sumerian literature, the Akkadians, Assyrians, and Babylonians compiled a substantial textual tradition of mythological narrative, legal texts, scientific works, letters and other literary forms. Conversely, Akkadian also influenced Sumerian literature.

== Literature in Akkadian society ==
Most of what we have from the Assyrians and Babylonians was inscribed in cuneiform with a metal stylus on tablets of clay, called laterculae coctiles by Pliny the Elder; papyrus seems to have also been utilised, but not been preserved.

There were libraries in most towns and temples in Akkad, Assyria, Babylonia, and Sumer; an old Sumerian proverb averred that "he who would excel in the school of the scribes must rise with the dawn." Women as well as men learned to read and write, and after the time the Sumerians themselves had been absorbed by the Semites circa 2000 BC, this involved a knowledge of the extinct Sumerian language, and a complicated and extensive syllabary. The Assyrians and Babylonians' very advanced systems of writing, science, medicine, civil administration, legal and economic structures and mathematics contributed greatly to their literary output.

Many works of Akkadian literature were commissioned by kings who had scribes and scholars in their service. Some of these works served to celebrate the king or the divine, while others recorded information for religious practices or medicine. Poetry, proverbs, folktales, love lyrics, military campaigns and accounts of disputes were all incorporated into Akkadian literature.

== Relation to other ancient literatures ==
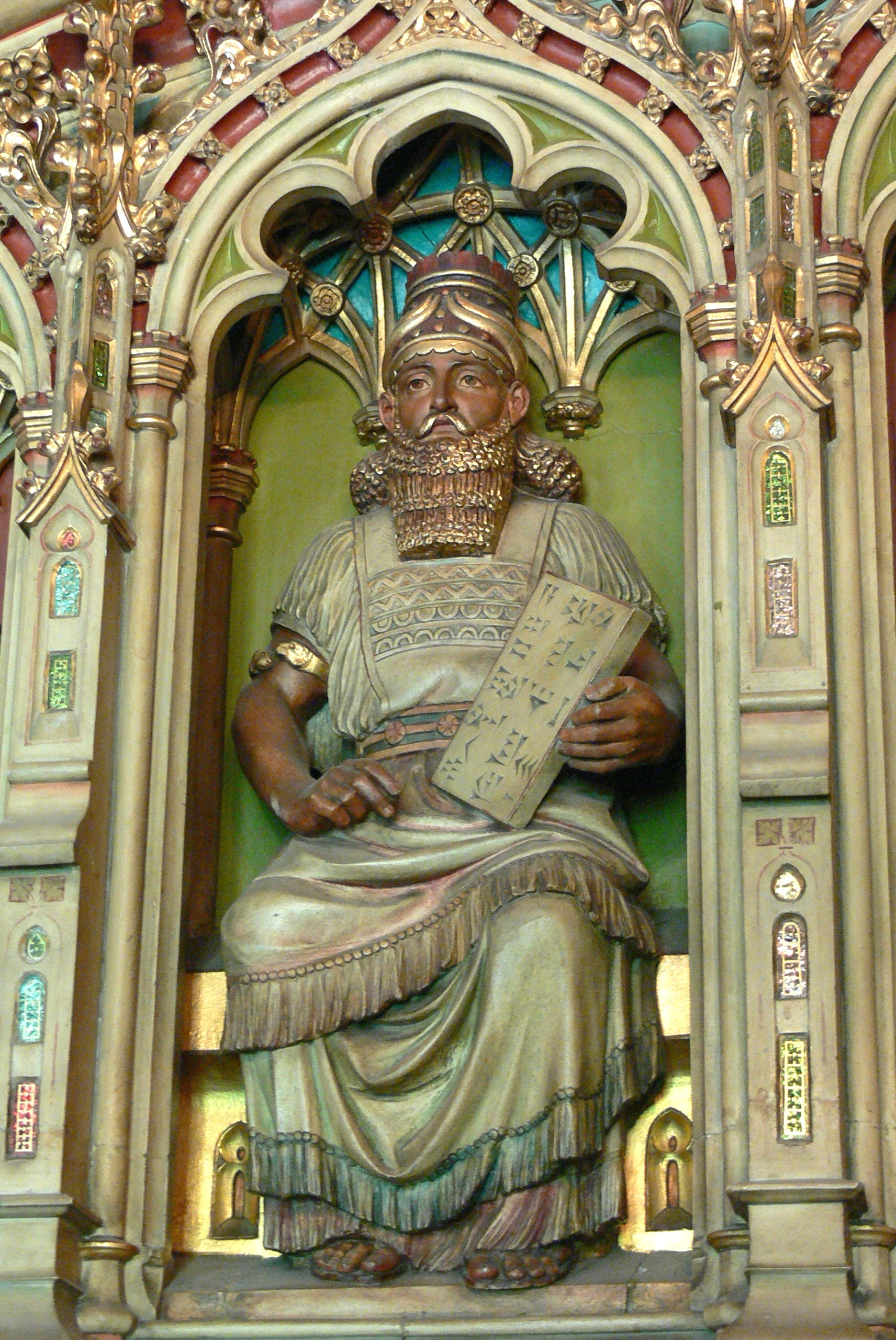
Cardiff Castle (Wales). Castle apartments: Library (1870s) - Allegory of Assyrian literature (relief by Thomas Nicholls).

A considerable amount of Akkadian, Assyrian and Babylonian literature was translated from Sumerian originals, and the language of religion and law long continued to be the old agglutinative language of Sumer, which was a language isolate. Vocabularies, grammars, and interlinear translations were compiled for the use of students, as well as commentaries on the older texts and explanations of obscure words and phrases. The characters of the syllabary were all arranged and named, and elaborate lists of them were drawn up.

Assyrian culture and literature came from the same source as Babylonia, but even here, there was a difference between the two ethnolinguistically similar countries. Assyrian literature was similar to that of Babylonia, however, in the early periods, education was mostly restricted to a single class of society in Assyria, unlike Babylonia. Under the second Assyrian empire, when Nineveh had become a great centre of trade, Aramaic — the language of commerce and diplomacy — was added to the number of subjects that the educated class was required to learn, dialects of which still survive among the Assyrian people today.

Under the Seleucids, Greek was introduced into Babylon, and fragments of tablets have been found with Sumerian and Assyrian (i.e. Semitic) words transcribed into Greek letters.

== Notable works ==
According to A. Leo Oppenheim, the corpus of cuneiform literature amounted to around 1,500 texts at any one time or place, approximately half of which, at least from the first millennium, is extant in fragmentary form, and the most common genres included (in order of predominance) are omen texts, lexical lists, ritual incantations, cathartic and apotropaic conjurations, historical and mythological epics, fables and proverbs.

=== Annals, chronicles, and historical epics ===
The Assyrian dialect of Akkadian is particularly rich in royal inscriptions from the end of the 14th century BC onward, for example the epics of Adad-nārārī, Tukulti-Ninurta, and Šulmānu-ašarēdu III and the annals which catalogued the campaigns of the neo-Assyrian monarchs. The earliest historical royal epic is, however, that of Zimri-Lim (c. 1710–1698 BC short) of Mari. Similar literature of the middle Babylonian period is rather poorly preserved with a fragmentary epic of the Kassite period, that of Adad-šuma-uṣur and of Nabû-kudurrī-uṣur I and Marduk.

The chronicle tradition is first attested in the compositions of the early Iron Age which hark back to earlier times, such as the Chronicle of Early Kings, the Dynastic Chronicle, Chronicle P and the Assyrian Synchronistic History. A series of fifteen neo to late Babylonian Chronicles have been recovered which narrate the period spanning Nabû-nasir (747–734 BC) to Seleucus III Ceraunus (243–223 BC) and were derived from the political events described in Babylonian astronomical diaries.

=== Humorous literature ===
Exemplars of comical texts span the genres of burlesque to satire and include humorous love poems and riddles. “At the cleaners” is a tale of the dispute between an insolent scrubber and his client, a “sophomoric fop” who lectures the cleaner in ridiculous detail on how to launder his clothes, driving the exasperated cleaner to suggest that he lose no time in taking it to the river and doing it himself. The Dialogue of Pessimism was seen as a saturnalia by Böhl, where master and servant switch roles, and as a burlesque by Speiser, where a fatuous master mouthes clichés and a servant echoes him. Lambert considered it a musing of a mercurial adolescent with suicidal tendencies.

The Aluzinnu (“trickster,” a jester, clown or buffoon) text, extant in five fragments from the neo-Assyrian period concerns an individual, dābibu, ākil karṣi, “character assassin,” who made a living entertaining others with parodies, mimicry, and scatological songs. The Poor Man of Nippur provides a subversive narrative of the triumph of the underdog over his superior while Ninurta-Pāqidāt's Dog Bite is a school text of a slapstick nature.

=== Laws ===
The earliest Akkadian laws are the “Old Assyrian Laws” relating to the conduct of the commercial court of a trading colony in Anatolia, c. 1900 BC. The Laws of Eshnunna were a collection of sixty laws named for the city of its provenance and dating to around 1770 BC. The Code of Ḫammu-rapi, c. 1750 BC, was the longest of the Mesopotamian legal collections, extending to nearly three hundred individual laws and accompanied by a lengthy prologue and epilogue. The edict of Ammi-Saduqa, c. 1646 BC, was the last issued by one of Ḫammu-rapi’s successors.

The Middle Assyrian Laws date to the fourteenth century BC, over a hundred laws are extant from Assur. The Middle Assyrian Palace Decrees, known as the “Harem Edicts,” from the reigns of Aššur-uballiṭ I, c. 1360 BC, to Tukultī-apil-Ešarra I, c. 1076 BC, concern aspects of courtly etiquette and the severe penalties (flagellation, mutilation and execution) for flouting them. The Neo-Babylonian Laws number just fifteen, c. 700 BC, probably from Sippar.

=== Mythology ===
One of the most famous of these was the Epic of Gilgamesh, which first appears in Akkadian during the Old Babylonian period as a circa 1,000 line epic known by its incipit, šūtur eli šarrī, ‘‘Surpassing all other kings,’’ incorporating some of the stories from the five earlier Sumerian Gilgamesh tales. A plethora of mid to late second millennium versions give witness to its popularity. The Standard Babylonian version, ša naqba īmeru, ‘‘He who saw the deep,’’ contains up to 3,000 lines on eleven tablets and a prose meditation on the fate of man on the twelfth which was virtually a word-for-word translation of the Sumerian “Bilgames and the Netherworld.” It is extant in 73 copies and was credited to a certain Sîn-lēqi-unninni and arranged upon an astronomical principle. Each division contains the story of a single adventure in the career of Gilgamesh, king of Uruk. The whole story is a composite product, and it is probable that some of the stories are artificially attached to the central figure.

Another epic was that of the "Creation" Enûma Eliš, whose object was to glorify Bel-Marduk by describing his contest with Tiamat, the dragon of chaos. In the first book, an account is given of the creation of the world from the primeval deep, and the birth of the gods of light. Then comes the story of the struggle between the gods of light and the powers of darkness, and the final victory of Marduk, who clove Tiamat asunder, forming the heaven from half of her body and the earth from the other. Marduk next arranged the stars in order, along with the sun and moon, and gave them laws they were never to transgress. After this, the plants and animals were created, and finally man. Marduk here takes the place of Ea, who appears as the creator in the older legends, and is said to have fashioned man from clay.

The legend of Adapa, the first man — a portion of which was found in the record-office of the Egyptian king Akhenaton at Tell-el-Amarna — explains the origin of death. Adapa, while fishing, had broken the wings of the south wind, and was accordingly summoned before the tribunal of Anu in heaven. Ea counselled him not to eat or drink anything there. He followed this advice, and thus refused the food that would have made him and his descendants immortal.

Among the other legends of Babylonia may be mentioned those of Namtar, the plague-demon; of Erra, the pestilence; of Etana and of Anzu. Hades, the abode of Ereshkigal or Allatu, had been entered by Nergal, who, angered by a message sent to her by the gods of the upper world, ordered Namtar to strike off her head. She, however, declared that she would submit to any conditions imposed on her, and would give Nergal the sovereignty of the earth. Nergal accordingly relented, and Allatu became the queen of the infernal world. Etana conspired with the eagle to fly to the highest heaven. The first gate, that of Anu, was successfully reached; but in ascending still farther to the gate of Ishtar, the strength of the eagle gave way, and Etanna was dashed to the ground. As for the storm-god Anzu, we are told that he stole the tablets of destiny, and therewith the prerogatives of Enlil. God after god was ordered to pursue him and recover them, but it would seem that it was only by a stratagem that they were finally regained.

=== Omens, divination and incantation texts ===
The magnitude of omen literature within the Akkadian corpus is one of the peculiar distinguishing features of this language's legacy. According to Oppenheim, 30% of all documents of this tradition are of this genre. Exemplars of omen text appear during the earliest periods of Akkadian literature but come to their maturity early in the first millennium with the formation of canonical versions. Notable among these is the Enuma Anu Enlil (astrological omens), Šumma ālu (terrestrial omens), Šumma izbu (anomalous births), Alamdimmû (physiognomic omens), and Iškar Zaqīqu (dream omens). It is among this genre, also, that the Sakikkū (SA.GIG) “Diagnostic Handbook” belongs.

The practice of extispicy, divination through the entrails of animals, was formalized into a science over the millennia by the Babylonians and supporting texts were eventually gathered into a monumental handbook, the Bārûtu, extending over a hundred tablets and divided into ten chapters. Divination, however, extended into other fields with, for example, the old Babylonian libanomancy texts, concerning interpreting portents from incense smoke, being one and Bēl-nadin-šumi's omen text on the flight paths of birds, composed during the reign of Kassite king Meli-Šipak, being another exemplar.

Incantations form an important part of this literary heritage, covering a range of rituals from the sacred, Maqlû, "burning" to counter witchcraft, Šurpu, “incineration” to counter curses, Namburbi, to preempt inauspicious omens, Utukkū Lemnūtu (actually bilingual), to exorcise “Evil Demons,” and Bīt rimki, or “bath house,” the purification and substitution ceremony, to the mundane, Šà.zi.ga, “the rising of the heart,” potency spells, and Zu-buru-dabbeda, “to seize the ‘locust tooth’,” a compendium of incantations against field pests.

=== Wisdom and didactic literature ===
A particularly rich genre of Akkadian texts was that represented by the moniker of “wisdom literature,” although there are differences in opinion concerning which works qualify for inclusion. One of the earliest exemplars was the Dialogue between a Man and His God from the late Old Babylonian period. Perhaps the most notable were the Poem of the Righteous Sufferer (Ludlul bēl nēmeqi) and the Babylonian Theodicy. Included in this group are a number of fables or contest literature, in varying states of preservation, such as the Tamarisk and the Palm, the Fable of the Willow, Nisaba and Wheat (kibtu), the Ox and the Horse (Inum Ištar šurbutum, “When exalted Ishtar”), the Fable of the Fox, and the Fable of the Riding-donkey.

W. G. Lambert and others include several popular sayings, and proverbs (both bilingual and Babylonian) together with the Lament of a Sufferer with a Prayer to Marduk, Counsels of Wisdom, Counsels of a Pessimist, and Advice to a Prince in this genre. “A Dialogue between Šūpê-amēli and His Father” (Šimâ milka) is a piece of wisdom literature in the manner of a deathbed debate from the Akkadian hinterland. There are also Akkadian translations of earlier Sumerian works such as the Instructions of Shuruppak which are often considered belonging to this tradition.

=== Disputation poems ===
The Akkadian disputation poem or Akkadian debate, also known as the Babylonian disputation poem, is a genre of Akkadian literature in the form of a disputation. They feature a dialogue or a debate involving two contenders, usually cast as inarticulate beings such as particular objects, plants, animals, and so forth. Extant compositions from this genre date from the early 2nd millennium BC, the earliest example being the Tamarisk and Palm, to the late 1st millennium BC. These poems occur in verse and follow a type of meter called 2||2 or Vierheber, which is the same meter found in some other Akkadian texts like the Enuma Elish.

=== Other genres ===
Besides the purely literary works, there were others of varied nature, including collections of letters, partly official, partly private. Among them the most interesting are the letters of Hammurabi, which have been edited by Leonard William King.

=== List of works ===
The following gives the better-known extant works, excluding lexical and synonym lists.

Abnu šikinšu • Adad-nārārī I Epic • Adad-šuma-uṣur Epic • Adapa and Enmerkar • Adapa and the South Wind • Advice to a Prince • Agushaya Hymn • Alamdimmû • Aluzinnu text • Ardat-lili • Asakkū marṣūtu • Ašipus' Almanac (or Handbook) • At the cleaners • Atra-ḫasīs • Autobiography of Adad-guppī • Autobiography of Kurigalzu • Autobiography of Marduk • Babylonian Almanac • Babylonian King List • Babylonian Theodicy • Bārûtu • Birth legend of Sargon • Bīt mēseri • Bīt rimki • Bīt salā’ mê • Bullussa-rabi’s Hymn to Gula • Catalogue of Texts and Authors • Chronicle of Early Kings • Chronicle of the Market Prices • Chronicle of reign of Šulgi • Chronicle P • Code of Hammurabi • Consecration of a priest • Counsels of a Pessimist • Counsels of Wisdom • Crimes and Sacrileges of Nabu-šuma-iškun • Curse of Akkad • Cuthean Legend of Naram-Sin • Dialogue between a Man and His God • Dialogue of Pessimism • Dingir.šà.dib.ba • Donkey Disputation • Dream of Kurigalzu • Dynastic Chronicle • Dynastic Prophecy • Dynasty of Dunnum (Harab Myth) • Eclectic Chronicle • Edict of Ammi-Saduqa • Egalkura spells • Elegies Mourning the Death of Tammuz • Enlil and Sud • Enuma Anu Enlil • Enûma Eliš • Epic of Anzu • Epic of Gilgameš • Epic of the Kassite period • Epic of Nabû-kudurrī-uṣur • Epic of the plague-god Erra (Erra and Išum) • Etana • Fable of the Fox • Fable of the Riding-donkey • Fable of the Willow • Girra and Elamatum • Great Prayer to Šamaš • Great Prayer to Nabû • Great Revolt Against Naram-Sin • Harem Edicts • Hemerology for Nazi-Maruttaš • Hymn to Ištar (“Ištar 2”) • Hymn to Ninurta as Savior • Hymn to the Queen of Nippur • Ḫulbazizi • Inana's Ascent • Iqqur Ipuš • Iškar Zaqīqu • Ištar’s hell ride • Kalûtu catalogue • KAR 6 • Kataduggû • Kedor-laomer texts • Kettledrum rituals • King of Battle (šar tamḫāri) • Ki'utu • Labbu myth • Lamaštu • Lament of a Sufferer with a Prayer to Marduk • Laws of Eshnunna • Lipšur litanies • Ludlul bēl nēmeqi • Maqlû • Marduk's Address to the Demons • Marduk Prophecy • Middle Assyrian Laws • Mîs-pî • Moon god and the cow • Mukīl rēš lemutti • MUL.APIN • Muššu'u • Na'id-Šihu Epic • Nabonidus Chronicle • Namburbi • Namerimburrudû • Neo-Babylonian Laws • Nergal and Ereškigal • New year ritual-Akitu procession • Nigdimdimmû • Ninurta-Pāqidāt's Dog Bite • Nissaba and the Wheat • Ox and the Horse • Palm and Vine • Pazuzu • Poor Man of Nippur • Prophecy A • Qutāru • Recipes against Antašubba • Religious Chronicle • Royal inscription of Simbar-Šipak • Sag-gig-ga-meš (Muruṣ qaqqadi) • Sakikkū • Salmānu-ašarēdu III Epic • Synchronistic History • A Syncretistic Hymn to Ištar • Șēru šikinšu • Šammu šikinšu • Šar Pūḫî • Šà.zi.ga • Series of Ox and Horse • Series of the Fox • Series of Ox and Horse • Series of the Poplar • Series of the Spider • Šēp lemutti • Story of the Poor, Forlorn Wren • Šu'ila • Šulgi Prophecy • Šumma ālu • Šumma amēlu kašip • Šumma immeru • Šumma Izbu • Šumma liptu • Šumma sinništu qaqqada rabât • Šurpu • Tākultu ritual texts • Tamarisk and Palm • Tamītu Oracles • Tašritu hemerology • Tukulti-Ninurta Epic • Tu-ra kìlib-ba • The therapeutic series UGU (Šumma amēlu muḫḫašu umma ukāl) • Uruhulake of Gula • Uruk King List • Uruk Prophecy • Ušburruda • Utukkū Lemnūtu • Verse Account of Nabonidus • Vision of the Netherworld • Walker Chronicle • Weidner Chronicle • Zimri-Lim Epic • Zi-pà incantations • Zisurrû (Sag-ba Sag-ba) • Zu-buru-dabbeda

== See also ==
- Ancient literature
- Ancient near eastern cosmology
