= Zisurrû =

Ancient Mesopotamian protection ritual

Zisurrû, meaning “magic circle drawn with flour,” and inscribed ZÌ-SUR-RA-a, was an ancient Mesopotamian means of delineating, purifying and protecting from evil by enclosing a ritual space in a circle of flour. It involved ritual drawings with a variety of powdered cereals to counter different threats and is accompanied by the gloss: SAG.BA SAG.BA, Akkadian: māmīt māmīt, the curse from a broken oath, in The Exorcists Manual, where it refers to a specific ritual on two tablets, only the first of which is extant.

== The ritual ==
The zisurrû, a word ultimately derived from Sumerian, was used as a defensive measure and drawn on the ground around prophylactic figurines as part of a Babylonian ritual to thwart evil spirits, around a patient's bed to protect against ghosts or demons in much the same manner in which bowls thwart demons and curses, or as a component of another elaborate ritual. It was a component in the Ritual and Incantation-Prayer against Ghost-Induced Illness: Šamaš, and also the Mîs-pî ritual. In the ritual tablet of the Maqlû incantation series, it instructs “Thereafter, you encircle the bed with flour-paste and recite the incantation sag.ba sag.ba and the incantation tummu bītu (“Adjured is the house”).” It occurs in a namburbi performed when preparing to dig a new well and appended to tablet seventeen of the Šumma ālu series. It is incorporated into the Kettledrum rituals, where the circle of flour surrounds the bull whose hide forms the drum skin. The incipit én sag.ba sag.ba also appears in the Muššu’u ritual tablet, line thirty-eight.

The circle is rationalized in commentaries as representing certain protective deities, LUGAL.GIR.RA and Meslamtae’a according to one. In other rituals a circle might be painted in whitewash or dark wash on either side of a doorway for apotropaic purposes. The choice of flour was crucial to the purpose of the ritual, with šemuš-flour reserved (níĝ-gig) for repelling ghosts, wheat-flour for rituals invoking personal gods and šenuḫa-barley to encircle beds, presumably to counter disease-carrying demons.

In the ritual against broken oaths, a catalogue from Aššur gives the incipits of the two tablets as én (abbreviation for én é-nu-ru) sag-ba sag-ba and én sag-ba min sil_{7}-lá-dè. The colophon line of the first of these tablets, which has been recovered, reads KA-INIM-ma ZÌ-ŠUR-ra NIG-ḪUL-GÁL BÚR.RU.DA-kam. The text describes measures to repel, thwart or imprison demons, such as trapping them in a covered fermentation vat.

== Primary publications ==
- G. Barton, H. C. Rawlinson (1875). The Cuneiform Inscriptions of Western Asia; Vol. IV: A Selection from the Miscellaneous Inscriptions of Assyria et Bd. R. E. Bowler. pl. 16 no. 1
- R. Campbell Thompson (1903). Cuneiform Texts from Babylonian Tablets, &c. in the British Museum, Part 17. pl. 34–36, line-art.
- R. Campbell Thompson (1904). "The tablet of the Ban; tablet "V"". The devils and evil spirits of Babylonia, vol II. Luzac and co. pp. 118–125. transliteration, translation.
- H. Zimmern (1914). "Die Beschwörung "Bann, Bann" (sag-ba sag-ba)". Zeitschrift für Assyriologie und Vorderasiatische Archäologie. 28: 75–80. doi:10.1515/zava.1914.28.1.75. S2CID 162276306.
- Gerhard Meier (1936–1937). "Keilschrifttexte nach Kopien von T. G. Pinches. Aus dem Nachlass veröffentlicht und bearbeitet". Archiv für Orientforschung. 11: 365–367. JSTOR 41634968. transliteration, translation
- W. H. Ph. Römer (1989). "Eine Beschwörung gegen den 'Bann'". In H. Behrens; D. Loding; M. T. Roth (eds.). DUMU-E2-DUB-BA: Studies in Honor of Åke W. Sjöberg. pp. 465–479.
- W. Schramm (2001). Bann, Bann! Eine sumerisch-akkadische Beschwörungsserie. Gottingen: Seminar fur Keilschriftforschung. pp. 20–72. text: A1.
