= Ningirima =

Mesopotamian goddess

- Goddess of incantations and purification
- Major cult center: Girima, Murum, Uruk
- Animals: snake, fish
- Symbol: possibly a battlemented crown

Genealogy
- Siblings: Enlil

Ningirima was a Mesopotamian goddess associated with incantations and ritual purification, as well as snakes and fish. She was a major member of the Mesopotamian pantheon in the Early Dynastic period. Her importance declined in the second millennium BCE, but in some locations, such as Ur, she was still worshiped after the Achaemenid conquest of Mesopotamia in the first millennium BCE. According to the god list An = Anum and other sources, she was regarded as a sister of Enlil. While suggestions that she was conflated with the mongoose deity Ninkilim can be found in modern literature, this theory finds no direct support in primary sources.

== Name ==
The standard early writing of Ningirima's name in cuneiform, known from Tell Fara, Abu Salabikh and Ebla, was ^{d}nin-A.MUŠ.ḪA.DU, with the sign sequence A.MUŠ.ḪA.DU read as girima. From the Sargonic period onward it was instead written as ^{d}nin-A.BU.ḪA.DU, while ^{d}nin-A.ḪA.KUD.DU became common in the Old Babylonian period. Other less common logographic spellings are known too. In later periods phonetic syllabic spellings are attested as well, for example ^{d}ni-gi-ri-ma.

The oldest writing of Ningirima's name can be literally translated from Sumerian as "mistress of snake and fish water". However, theological and astronomical texts indicate that it was typically explained in Akkadian as "lady of purification" (bēlet tēlilti). An explanatory god list additionally indicates that the late convention of writing of the element girim as A.ḪA.KUD.DU lead to the development of a scholarly reinterpretation of this theonym as gašan ālikat sulê [...], "the lady who goes the road of [...]", with the sign KUD (TAR) understood as sulû, "street", and DU as alāku, "to go". However, as stressed by Wilfred G. Lambert, this should only be considered a word play relying on alternate sign values.

=== Similar theonyms ===
A male deity named Ninigirima (or Engirima) is attested in the god list An = Anum ša amēli, where he is described as "Ea of the gardener" (Ea ša nukaribbi). (Note: The list has a hermeneutic character and reinterprets rare epithets and theonyms as designations of major members of the Mesopotamian pantheon, sometimes entirely based on word plays, homonyms, or hitherto unidentified factors, not necessarily reflecting the well documented aspects of character of the deities involved.) Antoine Cavigneaux and Manfred Krebernik assume that due to the difference in gender and character he should be considered entirely unrelated to the homonymous goddess. However, since he is not attested outside of this single god list, Ryan D. Winters suggests he might only be the result of reinterpretation of Ninigirima's name reliant on connecting the second element with the Sumerian word gurun (also girim, girin), "fruit", and was never a distinct deity otherwise.

It has been proposed that due to the phonetic similarity between their names and shared association with the settlement Murum Ningirima and Ninkilim were considered analogous, but according to Manfred Krebernik this proposal is implausible. He points out that while Ningirima was consistently considered a goddess, Ninkilim could be regarded as a male deity; that their placement in god lists always differs; and that while both were associated with snakes, the nature of this connection was not identical. However, Nathan Wasserman and Elyze Zomer argue that the male deity Ninkilkil, known exclusively from a single Old Assyrian incantation which refers to him as the "lord of the incantation" (bēl šipātim), the masculine form of a common title of Ningirima, might represent a unique instance of amalgamation of Ningirima and Ninkilim.

Despite the phonetic similarity between the names of Ningirima and Ningirida and their respective connections to Ninazu, there is no evidence the two were confused or conflated with each other.

== Character ==
Ningirima was associated with incantations. She could be referred to as the "lady of the incantations" (bēlet šipātim). Through the third millennium BCE, all texts belonging to this genre were symbolically attributed to her. However, in the Ur III period, even though most incantations were seemingly composed in Nippur, deities associated with Eridu, such as Asalluhi and Namma, started to predominate in them. Ningirima is nonetheless still well represented in incantations from the subsequent Old Babylonian and Old Assyrian periods, sharing her exorcistic role with Enki and Asalluhi. Some of them still invoke her in a legitimizing formula in which the performer states that a deity is the original author of the incantation. She is also attested in similar texts from outside Mesopotamia, as far west as Ugarit.

Eventually competition with deities such as Asalluhi and Marduk, who shared Ningirima's association with incantations, lead to a decline in her status, reducing her primary role to that of a divine purifier associated with basins of sacred water, rather than the preeminent divine exorcist. Ninigirima's association with ritual water vessels is particularly emphasized by her alternate name attested in the god list An = Anum (tablet I, line 345), Agubba, which is derived from a term referring to these cultic paraphernalia. (Note: Wilfed G. Lambert translated it as "divine censer", though according to Elizabeth A. Bennett this is most likely a mistake.) In association with this container she occurs as late in the Achaemenid and Seleucid periods.

Ningirima was also associated with fish and snakes. An Old Babylonian incantation refers to her as the "mistress" of snakes, indicating she was believed to have control over these animals. She could be implored to expel them, though she was also invoked to ward off demons and illnesses.

In astronomical texts Ningrima was associated with the scorpion star. However, the same astral body was also associated with Išḫara.

It has been proposed that depictions of a goddess wearing an "battlemented crown" (uncommon in Mesopotamian art) and holding two bottles can be identified as depictions of Ningirima.

== Associations with other deities ==
An association between Ningirima and Enlil is first documented in Early Dynastic incantations, with later sources describing them as siblings. For example, she is explicitly designated as his sister in a currently unpublished Sumerian incantation. As noted by Takayoshi M. Oshima, Ningirima continued to be recognized as Enlil's sister and a member of his circle at least up to the end of the Kassite period, as reflected by a reference to them as siblings preserved in An = Anum (tablet I, line 353). According to Wilfred G. Lambert a reference to Ningirima as a sister of Anu is also known, but Frank Simons noted that this interpretation might be based on an erroneous reading of a damaged tablet, which might simply contain another attestation of the standard sibling relation between Ningirima and Enlil. In some cases, due to their overlapping functions she could instead be referred to as sister of Asalluhi, and thus as a daughter of Enki. A single late instance of Ningirima possibly being reinterpreted as a member of Marduk's family, presumably as a result of reassignment of different aspects of Enlil s character and members of his court to him, is known from a prayer, though the restoration of the relevant passage is uncertain.

A ritual text from Nineveh mentions the "holy water vessel of Ningirima and Kusu"; both of them could also form a triad with Nisaba due to their shared association with purification. Another trinity consisted of Ningirima, Kusu and Girra, as attested attested in a consecration rite for priests of Enlil, in various incantations, and in royal inscriptions of Esarhaddon. Incantations indicate she could also be associated with Nanshe.

An early hymn compares Ningirima to the snake god Irḫan. She could be associated with another deity with serpentine traits, Išḫara, who also shared her connection with the "scorpion star". Manfred Krebernik notes that in the god list An = Anum both of them belong to the court of Enlil. Šurpu, the Weidner god list and other sources group Tishpak, Ninazu and Ningirima together, always in that order, also based on their shared association with snakes.

== Worship ==
Ningirima was a major member of the Mesopotamian pantheon in the third millennium BCE. Her elevated position is reflected by her placement in the Early Dynastic god list from Fara. She also appears in Ningirima is attested in a variety of other god lists from between the Early Dynastic and Neo-Assyrian periods, including the lists from Mari, Nippur and Sultantepe, the Weidner god list, the Old Babylonian An = Anum forerunner and An = Anum itself. Her cult had a supraregional significance, instead of being tied to the surroundings of a specific city. The existence of clergy of Ningirima is confirmed by formulas in incantations from Fara and Ebla, and by administrative texts from Puzrish-Dagan from the Ur III period which mention gudu priest of this goddess.

The forty-sixth of the seventy Early Dynastic Zame Hymns from Abu Salabikh is dedicated to her and situates her in Girim. (Note: Girim might also be implicitly the location associated with Ninekuga in the following hymn, as no separate toponym is listed in it.) It is unclear if this term should be interpreted as the name of a cultic installation or as a toponym. In the Early Dynastic period it is also attested as an element of personal names. Examples are known from Fara, Ur, Uruk and possibly Zabalam. It has been suggested that if Girim was a settlement, it was located in the proximity of Uruk-Kullaba. An identification with Murum, which is first attested as a cult center of Ningirima in the Sargonic Temple Hymns, has also been proposed. This settlement was most likely located near Bad-tibira. Manfred Krebernik and Jan Lisman argue that this settlement should be distinguished from the identically named cult centers of Nikilim and Ishkur. However, Andrew R. George considers Ningirim's and Nikilim's cult centers to be identical.

Uruk was also considered a major cult center of Ningirima. In an inscription of Lugalzagesi she is addressed as the "lady of Uruk". Further evidence connecting her with this city includes her placement near deities associated with her in god lists (Ninirigal in the god list from Fara, Nineanna in the later list from Mari) and a literary text from Fara which mentions her alongside Inanna and Ninirigal. She was also worshiped in Fara itself. Furthermore, she occurs in a text from Lagash which refers to her as the "great true-eyed one of heaven" (igi-zi-gal-an-na).

A late syncretic hymn (KAR 109) possibly addressed to Bau or Ishtar associates Ninigirima with Babylon. (Note: The city is poetically described in this context as the "entrance of the gods" (nēreb ilānī) in reference to the common understanding of its name as "gate of the gods" (bāb ilī).) However, aside from an inscription of Esarhaddon containing references to Ninigirima playing a role in mīs pî and pīt pî rituals held in the Ekarzagina, the sanctuary of Ea in the Esagil temple complex, no evidence exists for a close association between her and the pantheon of Babylon.

Ninigrima already appears in theophoric names from the third millennium BCE, one example being Ur-Ningirima. A single female theophoric name invoking Ningirima is known from the Neo-Babylonian period. She occurs in a single late theophoric name from Ur as well, Ningirima-ilat, "Nigirima is divine", dated to the reign of Artaxerxes II. Paul-Alain Beaulieu assumes that Ningirima's presence in the pantheon of this city well into Achaemenid times was the result of the association between her and Ninazu, whose cult was well established in Ur, and remained influential through the late first millennium BCE.
