= Mukīl rēš lemutti =

Mesopotamian demon

Mukīl rēš lemutti, inscribed in cuneiform Sumerian syllabograms as ^{(d)}SAG.ḪUL.ḪA.ZA (Note: The lù = zitàte lexical list (published in MSL 12),) and meaning "he who holds the head of evil", was an ancient Mesopotamian winged leonine demon, a harbinger of misfortune associated with benign headaches and wild swings in mood, where the afflicted "continually behaves like an animal caught in a trap." It was one of the two demons that followed people around, an “evil accomplice” also referred to as rabis lemutti (“he who offers misfortune”), with its auspicious alter-ego mukīl rēš daniqti or rabis damiqti (“he who offers good things”).

== Textual references ==
Although it features in the Exorcists Manual, the list of works of the craft of the āšipūtu, in the part attributed to Esagil-kin-apli himself, there is no extant work dedicated to this demon, or to the disorders it was thought to have promulgated. Instead, references to mukīl rēš lemutti are scattered among diverse texts. The earliest appearance of this demon comes in Old Babylonian lecanomancy omen collections.

The demon features in the Diagnostic Handbook. In the chapter on infectious diseases, tablet 22, lines 62 to 64 read:

If he continually laughs, “hand” of mukīl rēš lemutti; he will die … (Note: DIŠ iṣ-ṣe-né-eḫ ŠU ^{d}SAG.ḪUL.ḪA.ZA GAM …)

If he rejoices and is terrified, “hand of" mukīl rēš lemutti; he will die… (Note: DIŠ ḫa-di u pa-rid ŠU SAG.ḪUL.ḪA.ZA GAM …)

If he feels harassed, he will die (var. “hand” of mukīl rēš lemutti) (Note: DIŠ ud-daḫ-ḫa-as GAM / ŠU SAG.ḪUL.ḪA.ZA GAM …)

In the chapter concerning neurological syndromes, on tablet 27 a variant of line 4 provides the omen:

If a stroke had struck him and his forehead seizes him all the time, he sees mukīl rēš lemutti; he will die. (Note: DIŠ mi-šit-ti im-šid-su-ma SAG.KI-šú DIB.DIB-su SAG.ḪUL.ḪA.ZA IGI GAM.)

The demon frequently appears in prescriptions such as those for the fashioning of a figurine for a neurological disorder caused by a pursuing ghost, where “The evi[l confusional stat]e (causing ghost or) mukīl rēš lemutti-demon [which] was set [on] (personal name) son of (personal name)–he is your husband. You are given [t]o him (as wife).” In a burial ritual, where the malady is that “a person continually sees dead persons,” the text entreats the god Šamaš: “a ghost (or) mukīl rēš lemutti which was set on me and so continually pursues me – I am continually frightened and terrified (about him).” The demon is a harbinger of evil in the apodoses of omens, such as in the šumma padānu ("the path") chapter of the Bārûtu compendium:

If there are two Paths and the second is drawn at the rear of the Dyeing Vat; mukīl rēš lemutti (an evil demon) (Note: BE GÍR 2-ma MAN-ú ina EGIR NÍG.TAB e-ṣir mu-kil SAG MUNUS.ḪUL.)

It makes an appearance in both Šumma ālu, the monumental compendium of terrestrial omens, and the Iškar Zaqīqu, dream omen series. The Religious Chronicle records a unique appearance of this demon in the bed chambers of Nabû as one of the inauspicious omens encountered during the troubled reign of Babylonian king Nabû-mukin-apli (978 – 943 BC).
