= Atta mannu =

Atta mannu, “who are you?”, inscribed in cuneiform Sumerograms: A.BA.ME.EN.MEŠ, was an ancient Mesopotamian ritual or conjuration of uncertain content.

== Contemporary Citations ==
It is listed on the first Millennium B.C. compendium of ritual texts known as the Exorcists Manual with the Gloss: UR.SAG ḪUL.GÁL.ME.EN, Akkadian: qarrādu lemnu atta? “you wicked warrior”.

This title appears quite often at the beginning of ritual conjurations, such as that of the magical invocation work known as KAR 76, after its primary publication, and the anti-witchcraft series Maqlû, where it makes an appearance on five of the nine tablets. Its inclusion in the compendium of the āšipu (“exorcist”) would lead one to suppose it existed in antiquity as a separate ritual or incantation series. It remains, however, not extant.
