= Middle Eastern philosophy =

Various philosophies of the Middle East regions

Middle Eastern philosophy includes the various philosophies of the Middle East regions, including the Fertile Crescent and Iran. Traditions include Ancient Egyptian philosophy, Babylonian philosophy, Christian philosophy, Jewish philosophy, Iranian/Persian philosophy, and Islamic philosophy.

== Mesopotamian philosophy ==
The origins of Babylonian philosophy, in the popular sense of the word, can be traced back to the wisdom of early Mesopotamia, which embodied certain philosophies of life, particularly ethics, in the forms of dialectic, dialogs, epic poetry, folklore, hymns, lyrics, prose, and proverbs. The reasoning and rationality of the Babylonians developed beyond empirical observation.

It is possible that Babylonian philosophy had an influence on Greek philosophy, and later Hellenistic philosophy, however the textual evidence is lacking. The undated Babylonian text Dialogue of Pessimism contains similarities to the agnostic thought of the sophists, the Heraclitean doctrine of contrasts, and the dialogs of Plato, as well as a precursor to the maieutic Socratic method of Socrates and Plato. The Milesian philosopher Thales is also said to have studied philosophy in Mesopotamia.

== Ancient Egyptian philosophy ==
Egyptian philosophy began with development of its ancient cosmology. By 1,000 B.C. philosophers were already proposing four constituent elements in the universe, namely: mist, earth, fire, and water. This formed the basis of their investigations of the heaven and the earth. A tradition of Holism emerged out of this development. It addressed the ontological question: What exists? Egyptian thinkers joined spirit and matter so that humans were not separated from animals and even gods. For this reason, priests also functioned as philosophers, astronomers, architects, and healers.

There are scholars who cite that the ancient Egyptian philosophy influenced ancient Greek philosophy. Greek philosophers such as Plato and Pythagoras either went on pilgrimages in Egypt or received their training there. Pythagoras, particularly, established a philosophical school based on the Mystery School of ancient Egypt, where he spent training for more than two decades. This philosophy is rooted on Egyptian metaphysics that embraced the heavens and the earth in a sweeping unity.

== Ancient Iranian philosophy ==
See also Ancient Iranian Philosophy

=== Zoroastrianism ===
Zoroastrianism is a monotheistic religion, which originated in Iran. It has a dualistic nature (Ahura Mazda and Angra Mainyu), with an additional series of six important divine entities called the Amesha Spentas. In modern Zoroastrianism they are interpreted as aspects or emanations of Ahura Mazda (the Supreme Being), who form a heptad that is good and constructive. They are opposed to another group of seven who are evil and destructive. It is this persistent conflict between good and evil that distinguishes Zoroastrianism from monotheistic frameworks that have only one power as supreme. By requiring its adherents to have faith and belief in equally opposing powers Zoroastrianism characterizes itself as dualistic.

The teachings of Zarathustra (Zoroaster) appeared in Persia at some point during the period 1700-1800 BCE. His wisdom became the basis of the religion Zoroastrianism, and generally influenced the development of the Iranian branch of Indo-Iranian philosophy. Zarathustra was the first who treated the problem of evil in philosophical terms. He is also believed to be one of the oldest monotheists in the history of religion. He espoused an ethical philosophy based on the primacy of good thoughts (pendar-e-nik), good words (goftar-e-nik), and good deeds (kerdar-e-nik).

The works of Zoroaster and Zoroastrianism had a significant influence on Greek philosophy and Roman philosophy. Several ancient Greek writers such as Eudoxus of Cnidus and Latin writers such as Pliny the Elder praised Zoroastrian philosophy as "the most famous and most useful". Plato learnt of Zoroastrian philosophy through Eudoxus and incorporated much of it into his own Platonic realism. In the 3rd century BC, however, Colotes accused Plato's The Republic of plagiarizing parts of Zoroaster's On Nature, such as the Myth of Er.

=== Manichaeism ===
Manichaeism, founded by Mani, was influential from North Africa in the West, to China in the East. Its influence subtly continues in Western Christian thought via Saint Augustine of Hippo, who converted to Christianity from Manichaeism, which he passionately denounced in his writings, and whose writings continue to be influential among Catholic, Protestant and Orthodox theologians. An important principle of Manichaeism was its dualistic nature.

=== Mazdakism ===
The religious and philosophical teaching called Mazdakism, which its founder, Mazdak, regarded as a reformed and purified version of Zoroastrianism displays remarkable influences from Manichaeism as well.

=== Zurvanism ===
Zurvanism is characterized by the element of its first principle, which is time (Zurvan), as a primordial creator. According to Zaehner, Zurvanism appears to have three schools of thought, all with classical Zurvanism as a foundation: aesthetic, materialist, and fatalistic.

==== Aesthetic Zurvanism ====
Aesthetic Zurvanism—apparently not as popular as the materialistic kind—viewed Zurvan as undifferentiated time, which, under the influence of desire, divided reason (a male principle) and concupiscence (a female principle).

==== Materialist Zurvanism ====
While Zoroaster's Ormuzd created the universe with his thought, materialist Zurvanism challenged the concept that anything could be made out of nothing.

==== Fatalistic Zurvanism ====
Fatalistic Zurvanism resulted from the doctrine of limited time with the implication that nothing could change this preordained course of the material universe and that the path of the astral bodies of the 'heavenly sphere' was representative of this preordained course. According to the Middle Persian work Menog-i Khrad: "Ohrmazd allotted happiness to man, but if man did not receive it, it was owing to the extortion of these planets."

== Abrahamic traditions ==
=== Jewish philosophy ===
Jewish philosophy includes all philosophy carried out by Jews, both within their original homeland and in the diaspora.

=== Christian philosophy ===
- Christianity and Hellenistic philosophy
- Neoplatonism and Christianity
- Neoplatonism and Gnosticism
- Byzantine philosophy

=== Islamic philosophy ===
==== Early Islamic philosophy ====
The rise of Islam led to the emergence of various Islamic philosophical schools of thought. Schools influenced by Sufism involved esoteric philosophy, while the Mu'tazili school (partly influenced by Hellenistic philosophy) reconstructed rationalism, and the Ash'ari school reshaped logical and rational interpretation of God, justice, destiny and the universe.

The Philosophy of Illumination founded by Sohrevardi argued that light operates at all levels and hierarchies of reality. Light produces immaterial and substantial lights, including immaterial intellects, human and animal souls and even 'dusky substances', such as bodies. Sohrevardi's works display extensive developments on the basis of Zoroastrian ideas and ancient Iranian thought.

Other schools of philosophy were centered on the works of individual authors during the Islamic Golden Age, with Averroism and Avicennism being two of the most prominent such schools.

=== Baháʼí philosophy ===
`Abdu'l-Bahá, son and successor of the founder of the Baháʼí Faith, has explained the Baháʼí philosophy in the work Some Answered Questions.

== See also ==
- Babylonian literature: Philosophy
- Early Islamic philosophy
- Modern Islamic philosophy

== Sources ==
Printed sources

- Bowker, John (2000), The Concise Oxford Dictionary of World Religions, Oxford University Press
- Flood, Gavin D. (1996), An Introduction to Hinduism, Cambridge University Press
- Georgis, Faris (2010), Alone in Unity: Torments of an Iraqi God-Seeker in North America, Dorrance Publishing, ISBN 978-1-4349-0951-0
- Lockard, Craig A. (2007), Societies, Networks, and Transitions. Volume I: to 1500, Cengage Learning, ISBN 978-0618386123

Web-sources
