= Counsels of Wisdom =

Babylonian text

Counsels of Wisdom is a piece of Babylonian wisdom literature written in Akkadian containing moral exhortations. It is composed primarily of two-line units, without sections. A translation of extant portions of the text was published in Lambert 1996. Existing manuscripts are fragmentary, but the original was estimated to be about 160 lines. Its original composition dates to around the first dynasty of Babylon in the 2nd millenium BCE.

== Date of authorship ==
Scholars disagree on the date of the work. Gemser and Frans de Liagre Böhl placed it in the First Dynasty, but Lambert believes it should be dated to the Kassite period. The work is attested primarily by a stone tablet written in Late Babylonian script.

== Comparison with other wisdom literature ==
The text is addressed to "my son", which may be a physical son, a student, a successor, or a trope of the genre, as it is in later wisdom literature. Scholars have observed several pieces of ancient wisdom literature to be similar, including the Instructions of Shuruppak, Counsels of a Pessimist, and the Hymn to Šamaš. Together these works were an ancient genre. Similarities have been noticed with the Book of Proverbs, but no literary dependence has been found. The Counsels of Wisdom is believed to have been somewhat popular in its time, since fragments of this passage are quoted in other extant works. The work may have influenced the Wisdom of Ahiqar.

== Kindness to evildoers ==
Biblical scholar John Nolland sees a passage in the Counsels of Wisdom as a possible precursor to Jesus' command to "love your enemies", where it advises in the Mesopotamian text: "Do not return evil to the man who disputes with you; requite with kindness your evildoer, maintain justice to your enemy, smile on your adversary." Hector Avalos cites it alongside the Instruction of Amenemope (ca. 14th-11th centuries BCE) where it states "don't raise an outcry against one who attacks you, nor answer him yourself", as examples of the moral principle existing centuries earlier.

== See also ==
- Akkadian literature
- Code of Ur-Nammu
- Wisdom literature
