= Story of the Poor, Forlorn Wren =

Work of Akkadian Literature

The Story of the Poor, Forlorn Wren is a work of Akkadian literature in the form of a disputation, preserved only in late manuscripts. It contains a fable featuring a wren and an eagle. It is an example of poetic expression in the literature of Iraq in the first millennium BCE.

== Story ==
The minute bird called diqdiqqu or duqduqqu ("wren") in Akkadian is a bird of proverbial small size and great ambitions. The Story of the Poor, Forlorn Wren describes his conflict with Eagle – paragon of pride – resolved by the Sun God.

The opening lines represent Eagle nesting on top of a mountain, and Wren in the more humble abode of a "mountain plant". Wren, described as "poor, forlorn" (epithets reminiscent of those given to Gimil-Ninurta in Poor Man of Nippur), is apparently prevented by Eagle from going out to feed himself, for which reason he demands justice from the Sun God. Wren concedes that "my size may be small" – after all, he is called the "one-shekel bird", i.e., the bird who weighs only 8 grams –, but contends that he should still be allowed to subsist. The Sun God apparently punishes Eagle for its pride, whereupon Wren exhorts the "birds from the mountain and the plain" to sing the god's praises for making him an equal to Eagle. Eagle should never boast again of the loftiness of its nesting sites, nor should Wren be ashamed of his humble abode. The poem ends with a short epimythium: the beloved of Marduk alone is allowed to nest and raise his progeny.

== Manuscripts ==
The text appears to be a late composition, perhaps from the second half of the first millennium BCE. It is preserved in three library manuscripts from Babylon: one of them, MS BabPar1, dated to 69 BCE, is one of the latest datable cuneiform literary texts. In addition, two excerpts of the fable on school tablets from Babylon and Nippur are known, which shows that its celebration of the ways of the humble found the favor of the Mesopotamian pedagogues.

The first edition of this text, still riddled with lacunas, was published in 2017.
