= Bīt mēseri =

Bīt mēseri, inscribed bit me-se-ri^{meš} and meaning “House of Confinement” or “Detention,” is an ancient Mesopotamian ritual incantation text complete on four cuneiform tablets for the protection of the house against invading evil. The earliest extant copies are neo-Assyrian, from the library of Ashurbanipal, where, according to its ritual tablet, it was to be conducted regularly in the months of Tašrītu and Araḫsamna, but there is also a late Babylonian (4th or 3rd century BC) rescension recovered from the house of a priest in Uruk and copied by Anu-ikṣur, kalû, or incantation priest, son of Šamaš-iddin, descendant of Šangû-Ninurta. It is one of the works cited in the Exorcists Manual as forming part of the curriculum of the āšipu, or exorcist.

== The text ==
In contrast to the incantation šēp lemutti ina bīt amēli parāsu, “to block the foot of evil into a man’s house,” which provides the ritual to be performed to protect a house from demonic attack, bīt mēseri prescribes the activities to be performed when someone has already become ill, which was assumed to be under demonic assault. The first tablet is extant in fragmentary form and probably included the incipits to the incantations on the other three tablets. Offerings are made to Ea, Šamaš and Marduk and there is a purification of “all the statues of wood and [clay] that you have made.”

The second tablet includes an instruction for the āšipu conducting the ritual – to impersonate the god Marduk: šiptu šipat Marduk āšipu ṣalam Marduk, "The incantation is the incantation of Marduk, the āšipu is the very image of Marduk." It describes the events (deaths, confusion and unhappiness) which have befallen the house and led to the selection of this ritual and then provides a lengthy list of figures and incantations. The text describes in detail how figurines should be formed and paintings drawn of the apkallus, "sages," and the invocation to make them incarnate. They are arranged in the sick person’s room, close to his bed:

To the seven figures of purādu-apkallus, painted with gypsum and black paste that are drawn at the side of the bedroom at the wall.

To the seven figures of the consecrates cornel; they stand in the gate of the bedroom nearest the sick man at the head of the bed.

To the seven figures of apkallus or tamarisk, kneeling, that stand at the foot of the bed.

It concludes with a lengthy prayer to the god Nusku, who is entreated to "expel the Demon, overcome Evil, and Šulak, the nightly wanderer, whose touch is death."

The third tablet of the series is perhaps why the incantation series is considered significant as it includes the earliest extant list of the apkallus. These come in three forms – ūmu-, fish- and bird-apkallus, where the former may mean light and/or day and seem to be of human descent. In contrast to the other extant lists, there are eleven of these primordial beings, in two distinct groups, seven antediluvian and four postdiluvian:

Incantation: Uanna, "who accomplishes the plans of heaven and earth." (mušaklil uṣurāt šamê u erṣeti).

Uannedugga, who is given broad understanding. Enmedugga, to whom a good fate is decreed.
Enmegalamma, who was born in a house. Enmebulugga, who grew up in a pasture land.
Anenlida, the conjuror from Eridu. Utuabzu, "who ascended to heaven." (ša ana šamê ilū)
The pure purādu-fishes, the purādu-fishes from the sea, the seven of them, the seven apkallus, born in the river, who control the plans of heaven and earth.

Nungalpiriggaldim, the apkallu of Enmerkar, who brought down Ištar from heaven into the sanctuary.
Piriggalnungal, born in Kiš, who angered the god Adad in heaven, so he allowed neither rain nor growth in the land for three years.
Piriggalabzu, born in Adab, who hung his seal on a “goat fish” and thereby angered the god Ea in the fresh water sea, so that a fuller struck him with his own seal.
The fourth, Lu-Nanna, two-thirds apkallu, who expelled a dragon from É-Ninkiagnunna, the Ištar temple of Šulgi;

The four apkallus, of human descent, whom the Lord Ea has endowed with broad understanding.

— bīt mēseri III 1’-29’

At the end of the third tablet, the statues are discarded in the river and the drawings erased from the walls. The fourth tablet is fragmentary.
