= Namerimburrudû =

Namerimburrudû or “curse-breaking” incantations, inscribed KA-INIM-MA NAM-ÉRIM-BÚR-RU-DA-KAM, are ancient Mesopotamian spells composed to avert the effects of oath-breaking, namely the curses which result from them. The genre is listed on the Exorcists Manual with the gloss: [māmītu] ana pašāri, “to dissolve a curse.” Probably a genre on single clay tablets rather than a defined series, exemplars have been found in the Library of Ashurbanipal and late Babylonian Sippar.

== The incantation ==
In many respects, Namerimburrudû incantations share characteristics with both the Šurpu series and Lipšur litanies. The incantations endeavor to determine whether the subject has intentionally or otherwise sworn falsely and brought upon himself the wrath of his personal god. However, in contrast, the invocation of inanimate objects, such as various boats, road travel, sunrise and sunset, entry and exit of city gates, the street, oven or bellows, may merely be related to their misuse in the delivery of oaths.

The accompanying ritual entails the use of figurines of the demons Silakkum and Barīrītum to carry away the subjects sins: lû paṭrā lû passā, “may it be released, may it be wiped out.” Various deities, natural forces (the four winds, Tigris, Euphrates, Diyala and Zab rivers) and ritual objects (plants, woods, reeds, altars and vessels) are employed to neutralize the curse. There is a litany of sins the gods are asked to forgive, and finally a ritual is described where flour and dates are scattered, beer is poured, and sulfur burned.
