= Zu-buru-dabbeda =

Ancient Akkadian text

Zu-buru-dabbeda, inscribed zú-buru_{5}-dib-bé-da, is the most complete exemplar of a small body of similarly themed texts from ancient Mesopotamia. Composed in Akkadian, it is a compendium of incantations against field pests such as locusts, grasshoppers, insect larvae, weevils and other vermin, the creatures known as the "great dogs of Ninkilim". Authorship credited to a certain Papsukkal-ša-iqbû-ul-inni, a scholar and cleric of Babylon and Borsippa.

== The text ==
Listed in the Exorcist's Manual, (Note: VAT 8275 (KAR 44) and duplicates, obverse 22.) recovered from Nineveh, Aššur, Babylon, Sippar and Uruk and the catalogue of apotropaic and prophylactic rituals known as Namburbi from Nineveh, it was inscribed on perhaps four tablets. It is one of the many texts only recovered from the Library of Ashurbanipal. The text provides a series of invocations to various deities, entreating them to deflect various subjects of the god Ninkilim:

Accept, O East Wind that averts [storm-damage!] Eat the tasty food, drink [the sweet liquid!] Get rid of the great dogs of [Ninkilim,] locusts whose mouths are a Deluge, [a tempest,] mice whose mouths are a Deluge, [a tempest!] Come [around] to this plot of farmland and lead them [away . . . !] Seize them by the hand, [take them away! Take them off ] to the latch of the heavens! Roast them, [ . . . them!] By command of Marduk, [lord of exorcism,] by command of Adad, [king of plenty,] by command of Ninurta, foremost one of E-kur! (Note: Tablet K 3270+, 16–28.)

There is a sequence of šuilla-prayers and incantations ("ka.inim.ma") to a variety of gods and the four winds, in a formulaic structure. The latter part of the series introduces rituals, one of which involves the fumigation of the infested field with a censer of juniper. In a letter (Note: Tablet ABL 1015.) to Sargon II by his governor of Assur, Ṭab-ṣilli-Ešarra, he quotes the king's instructions to carry out just such a ritual fumigation. The final ritual includes a pause of seven days, a sacrificial white lamb, a bonfire heaped with a variety of offerings, and careful treatment of the charred remains. The tablet includes a plea that "An ignorant scholar, who does not know the wise arts and is not skilled in wisdom, must not see (it)!" It then concludes with a list of equipment needed to perform the rituals.
