= Ištar 2 =

Piece of Akkadian literature

Ištar 2, also called the Hymn to Ištar or the Great Ištar Prayer, is a piece of Akkadian literature. It is a long and elaborate prayer of the shuilla ("lift of the hand") type. It was composed in the second millennium BC. Six Akkadian textual witnesses are known, but only one is complete. There is also an incomplete Hittite copy.
