= Catalogue of Texts and Authors (Akkadian literature) =

Work of Akkadian Literature

The Catalogue of Texts and Authors is a work of Akkadian literature. The Catalogue represents the most important Mesopotamian metatext: its compiler grouped together texts or text categories under the names of authors "from whose mouth" they purportedly stem. Works are ascribed to Ea (the god of wisdom), to antediluvian sages and semi-mythical kings; but also to famous family ancestors and scholars from a less remote past. Additionally, some compositions are said to result from divine revelation or from dictation by certain animals.

== Composition and manuscripts of the text ==
The composition of the Catalogue can be tentatively dated at some point between the 10th (the plausible composition date of the latest works included in it) and 7th centuries BCE (the date of its earliest manuscripts). Furthermore, as all post-diluvian scholars mentioned in it are said to either stem from Babylon, Nippur, or Eridu, a Babylonian origin of the text is more than likely. At present, the Catalogue is preserved in two versions: one from 7th century Nineveh and a less well-preserved one from Hellenistic or Arsacid Babylon. Both use the same basic pattern and overlap in some of the titles listed, but seem to belong to two divergent recensions.

== Authorship in ancient Mesopotamia ==
The Catalogue shows that Babylonian scholars wondered who created their canonical texts. This fact in itself is remarkable, since for the most part of its history Mesopotamian scholarly tradition showed little interest in understanding works of literature as creations of inspired individuals (see Author). For this reason, it has been argued that the main raison d'être of the Catalogue was not the concern for the biographies of individual authors, but rather the wish to underline the professional and familial heritage of the scribes whose prerogative it was to engage with and maintain cuneiform scholarship.
