= Advice to a Prince =

Work of Akkadian literature

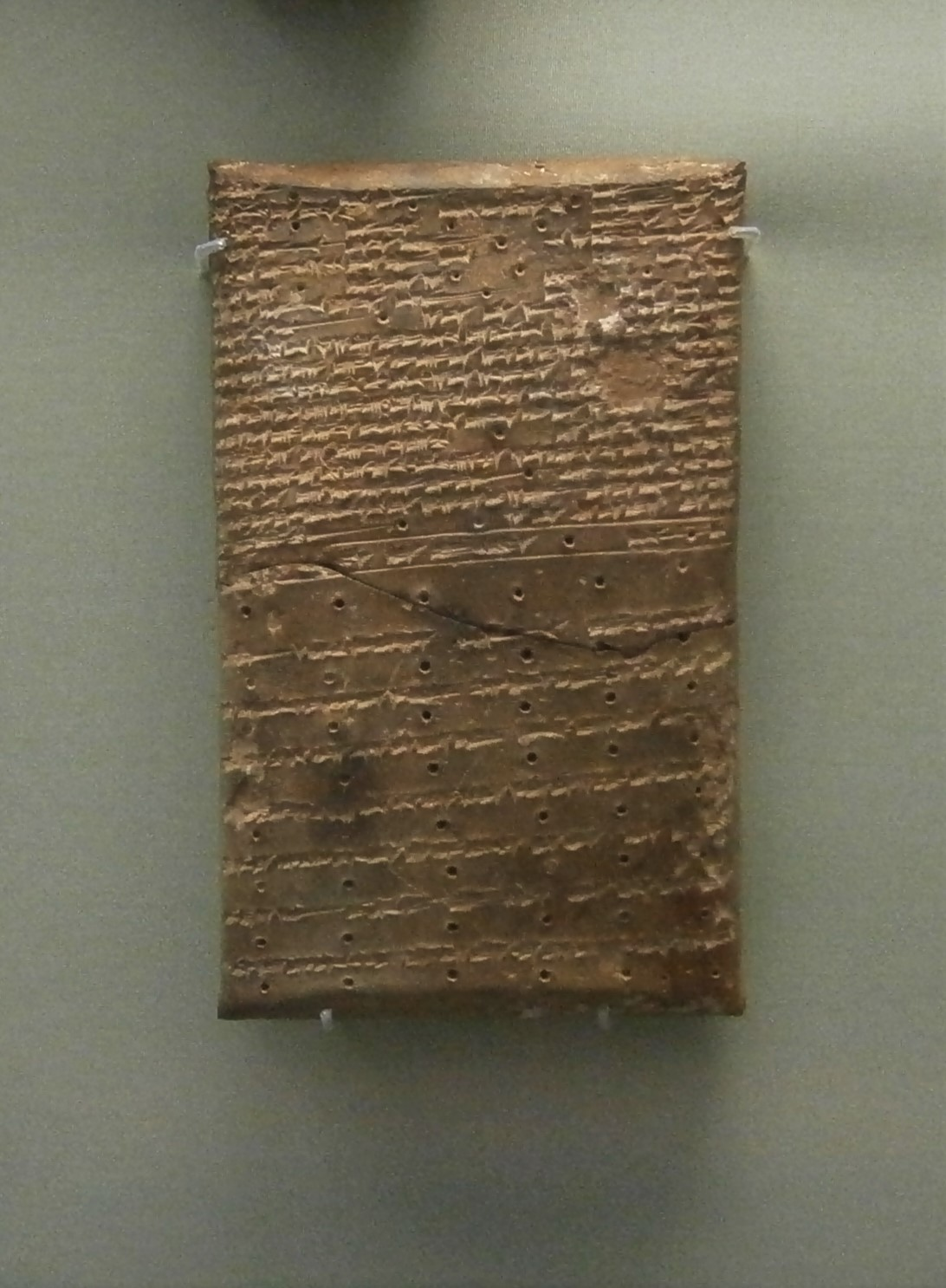
Nineveh Manuscript of Advice to a Prince

The Akkadian composition Advice to a Prince, also known as Babylonischer Fürstenspiegel, calls on future kings and magnates to heed justice. More particularly, it exhorts them to respect the special status of the three ancient Babylonian cities Sippar, Nippur and Babylon, whose citizens are presented as exempted from forced labor and taxes by divine decision. In a casuistic structure reminiscent of both law and omen treatises, the text lists the divine punishments reserved for the powerful who do not abide by its clauses.

== Manuscripts of the text ==
The way the Advice is written is remarkable in three different respects: first, both manuscripts make use of archaizing syllabic sign values and certain linguistic features of older stages of Akkadian. Secondly, they use a plethora of logographic writings, a practice usually restricted to technical literature. Thirdly, the text omits conjunctions and relative pronouns at the beginning of lines and at times employs infinitives where finite forms would be expected. These features are probably affectations intended to increase the apparent age of the text, and their presence makes it difficult to date its composition.

Advice to a Prince is attested in two manuscripts from first-millennium Nippur and Nineveh and listed in an inventory of the royal libraries at Nineveh (K.10182). Furthermore, the text is quoted in a letter sent from Nippur to the Assyrian king, which asks for his support to rebuild the city.
