= Sultantepe =

Assyrian archaeological site in Turkey

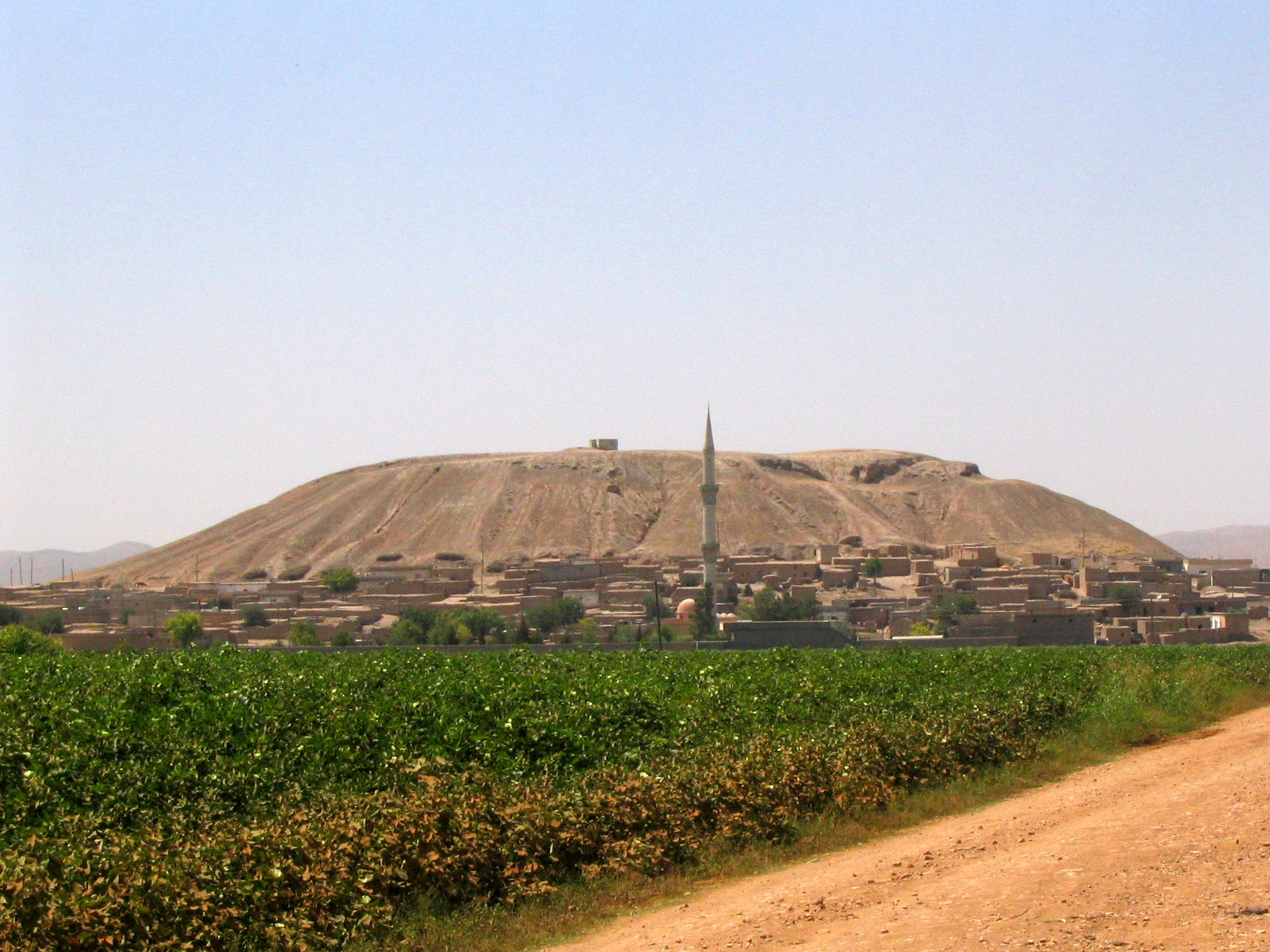
- The tell of Sultantepe seen from a distance, with the modern village Sultantepe Köyü at its base.

- Location within Turkey
- 37°03′01″N 38°54′22″E
- Type: Settlement
- Periods: Neo-Assyrian, Hellenistic, Roman
- Location: Sultantepe Köyü, Şanlıurfa Province, Turkey
- Region: Mesopotamia

Site notes
- Length: 100 m (330 ft)
- Width: 50 m (160 ft)
- Area: 0.5 ha (1.2 acres)

Sultantepe (Huzirina?), a tell with a temple complex from the Late Assyrian, an archeological site at the edge of the Neo-Assyrian Empire, now in Şanlıurfa Province, Turkey. Sultantepe is about 15 kilometres (9.3 mi) south of Urfa on the road to Harran. The modern village of Sultantepe Köyü lies at the base of the tell.

== History ==
=== Iron Age ===
==== Assyrian period ====
Excavations have revealed an Assyrian city, with eighth to seventh century levels that were rebuilt after ca 648 BCE, containing a hoard of cuneiform tablets, including versions of the Epic of Gilgamesh and school texts including exercise tablets of literary compositions full of misspellings. The complete library of some 600 unfired clay tablets was found outside a priestly family house. Contracts also found at the site consistently record Aramaean names, J. J. Finkelstein has remarked The writings end suddenly simultaneously with the fall of nearby Harran in 610 BCE, two years after the fall of Nineveh. The tablets from Sultantepe now form the Assyrian library in the Archaeological Museum at Ankara.

The site remained unoccupied during the subsequent Neo-Babylonian and Achaemenid periods, to be re-occupied by Hellenistic and Roman times. The modern village lies in an arc round the base of the mound on the north and east.

== Archaeology ==
Sultantepe is a steep-sided mound over 50 m. high, with a flat top measuring 100 by 50 m.. Erosion on one side had exposed giant basalt column-bases, apparently belonging to a monumental gateway, which established the Assyrian level, at which, on another face of the mound, massive wall-ends projected, standing on the same level, some 7 m. below the top surface of the mound. The temple was eventually identified as dedicated to Sin by a well-carved stele bearing his symbol of a crescent moon with its horns upwards on a pedestal in relief.

A brief preliminary campaign at Sultantepe in May–June 1951 was followed by a series of soundings made in 1952 by Seton Lloyd of the British Institute or Archaeology at Ankara with Nuri Gökçe, of the Archaeological Museum, Ankara. Further work at the site was precluded by the seven-meter layer of Hellenistic and Roman era debris covering the remainder of the site.

== The Sultantepe Tablets ==
A series of publications of The Sultantepe Tablets have been edited and published in Anatolian Studies (British Institute at Ankara) from 1953 onwards by O. R. Gurney and others. The texts range widely. Some of the highlights are:

- A series of tablets record the eponyms, or limmu officials, whose names were used by the Assyrians for dating their years, and so provide support for the standard Assyrian chronology during the period 911—648 BCE in the "Eponym Canon"
- Forty lines of the Creation Epic, Enuma Elish, which were missing from the texts recovered in Assyria proper
- A long section of the Epic of Gilgamesh apparently copied by a schoolboy from dictation, full of errors. There is also a fragmentary abraded and bent unfired tablet of the feverish dream of Enkidu.
- Sections of the composition called The Righteous Sufferer or by its incipit Ludlul bēl nēmeqi, with strong parallels in the Book of Job. The Sultantepe library furnished for the first time text of Tablet I, narrating the Righteous Sufferer's tribulations at the hands of men,
- The narû text (complete in 175 lines), a literary genre composed as if it were a transcription from an engraved royal stele, introducing the king by his titles, followed by a first-person narrative of his reign, concluding with imprecations against defacing the inscription and blessings for preserving it; in this case the narû text is the "Legend of Naram-Sin", associated to the famous Akkadian king's name but in no degree historical; the Sultantepe text completes and revises the interpretation of long-known fragmentary texts from Assurbanipal's library at Nineveh and Hittite archives at Hattusa and includes the fragment previously known as "The Legend of the King of Cuthah".
- The complete text of a new Akkadian literary text, an example of a new genre, The Poor Man of Nippur (complete in 160 lines), a tale which originated no doubt at Nippur and in the mid-second millennium BCE, represented in a seventh-century recension that was published in Anatolian Studies 6 (145ff) and 7 (135f).

Other texts of importance include rituals, incantations, omen readings, contracts and vocabulary lists.

== See also ==
- Cities of the ancient Near East
