= Summa izbu =

Mesopotamian compendium of omens

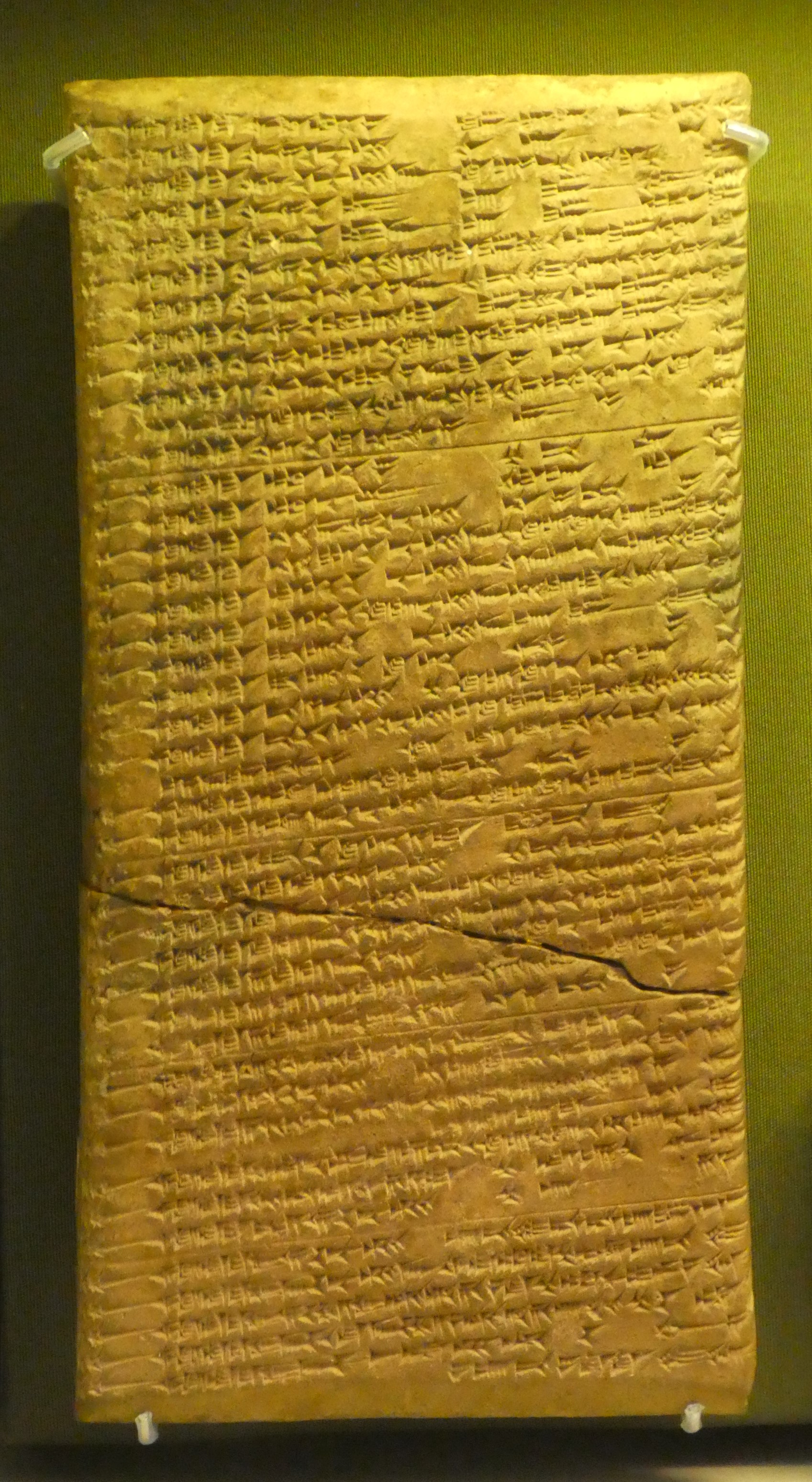
A šumma izbu tablet from the library of Ashurbanipal

Šumma izbu, “If a reject (= anomalous birth)” is an ancient Mesopotamian compendium of around 2,000 teratological omens, on 24 tablets probably formed from three separate earlier series on odd human births, šumma sinništu arâtma, “if a woman is pregnant” (tablets 1–4), the šumma izbu proper, on physically malformed births (tablets 6–17), and anomalous animal births: goats (tablet 18), cattle and donkeys (tablet 19), horses (tablets 20–21), pigs (tablet 22), dogs (tablet 23), wild animals (tablet 24), lambs (tablet 5, possibly the oldest in the series) and sheep (distributed across tablets 18–24). Exemplars of izbu compendia first appear in the old Babylonian period but it is not until the late second millennium that it is thought to have reached canonical form and exemplars of teratomantic texts from this era have been found in Assur and Babylon as well as further afield in Susa, Emar, Ugarit (in Ugaritic) and Ḫattuša. The most complete form of the text comes from copies in the library of Ashurbanipal.

== The text ==
It was one of the works cited by the astrologer Marduk-šāpik-zēri as evidence of his learning in his letter to Aššur-bāni-apli in search of employment. Its esoteric nature was emphasized by the royal astrologer Balasi, in his letter to the same king:

Šumma izbu is difficult to interpret. The first time I come before the king, my lord, I shall (personally) show, with this tablet that I am sending to the king, my lord, how the omen in written. Really, [the one] who has [not] had (the meaning) pointed out to him cannot possibly understand it.

— Balasi, Letter to Aššur-bāni-apli

In common with other works of omens, each clause is formed from a protasis giving the antecedent and an apodosis giving the consequence. In common with the Sakikkū (SA.GIG), it arranges the malformations ištu muḫḫi adi šēpi, “from head to foot,” and in the color sequence: white, black, red, green–yellow, and variegated. Some of the tablets focus on malformations of single body parts, such as horns (tablet 9), eyes (tablet 10) and ears (tablet 11) and others record the behavior of adult animals as well as their offspring, such as tablet 22 which begins treating with the birth of piglets of monstrous shape (kūbu) and then goes on to describe the behavioral anomalies in sows, pigs in general, and wild boars.

The series includes omens of public apodoses (mostly tablets 1–17), “If a woman gives birth, and at birth (the child) is already as white as alabaster—end of the reign; omen of a despotic king,” and private apodoses (mostly tablets 18–24), “If a woman gives birth to an ecstatic [maḫḫu], male or female, she has been impregnated in the street by a sinful man.” The sinful man being one who has leprosy (garbānu) or dropsy (male mê). For the most part, private omens concerned the fortunes of the bēl bīti, head of a household, or the owner of a flock or herd and related to life and death, health, general condition, relationship with the gods, social status, family and economic circumstances. “If a woman gives birth to a dog: the owner of the house will die, and his house will be scattered; the land will go mad; pestilence.” For public omens, the subject might relate to the king and his immediate family, or more generally the country as a whole, “There will be bad times. The mother will bar her door against her daughter; there will be no [sense of] brotherhood.”

The work follows the common left-right polarity, where right is generally auspicious, left not so, where for example a deformity to the right ear is bad, to the left ear is good and two right ears are good whereas two left ears are perceived to be bad. The work shares much in common with some of the izbu omens in the Šumma ālu series, from which it may have borrowed, or alternatively provided a source for these “unprovoked” omens. A late Babylonian commentary relates some of the omens to astrological observations:

If you want to find the izbu: (If) the constellation of the month passed by and you see half of it in the second month, there will be an izbu (such that) the child who will be born will be defective. If at the beginning of Capricorn one of the planets reaches first visibility or reaches a stationary point or is high (and) another (planet) remains visible: women will bear twins. Capricorn (is relevant) for cattle. The izbu which began in Leo inside the constellation Leo in front of the star Erua.
