= Ninkilim =

Mesopotamian deity

The god Ninkilim, inscribed ^{d}nin-PEŠ_{2}, is a widely referenced Mesopotamian deity from Sumerian to later Babylonian periods whose minions include wildlife in general and vermin in particular. His name, Nin-kilim, means "Lord Rodent," where rodent, pronounced šikku but rendered nin-ka_{6}, is a homograph.

He is described in the Sumerian language as a.za.lu.lu “lord of teeming creatures”, and in Akkadian as Bēl-nammašti “lord of wild animals” and features in much of the incantation texts against field pests, such as the Zu-buru-dabbeda. Although Ninkilim is feminine in the great god-list, and the Sumerian Farmer's Almanac – (which entreats the farmer to pray to Ninkilim, goddess of field mice, so that she will keep her sharp-toothed little subjects away from the growing grain), the field-pest incantations know him as masculine, as do other texts of the later periods. Ninkilim was often regarded as the creator of various field pests, though this role could also be assigned to the god Ennugi or to Alulu, a legendary primordial king of Eridu who was apparently believed to detest barley (metaphorically referred to as "Queen Nisaba").

The 8th year of Iddin-Dagān celebrates his selection “by means of the omens (of) the high-priestess of Nin-kilim.” He was one of the patron deities, with the goddess Bēlit-ilī, of the city of Diniktum.

Suggestions that Ninkilim was equated with Ningirima can be found in older publications, based on the similarity of their names, a shared cult center (Murum) and other factors, but according to Manfred Krebernik this proposal is implausible. He points out the following differences: while Ningirima is always female, Ninkilim could be regarded as a male deity; their placement in god lists always differs; while both were associated with snakes, the nature of this connection was not identical.
