= Hymn to Ninurta as Savior =

Piece of Akkadian literature

The Hymn to Ninurta as a Savior is a piece of Akkadian literature.
