= Namburbi =

Magical texts which take the form of incarnations

The NAM-BÚR-BI are magical texts which take the form of incantations (Akkadian: namburbȗ). They were named for a series of prophylactic Babylonian and Assyrian rituals to avert inauspicious portents before they took on tangible form. At the core of these rituals was an appeal by the subject of the sinister omen to the divine judicial court to obtain a change to his impending fate. From the corpus of Babylonian-Assyrian religious texts that has survived, there are approximately one hundred and forty texts, many preserved in several copies, to which this label may be applied.

== The apotropaic ritual ==
The Sumerian rubric, NAM-BÚR-BI, which devolved from the broader class of counter-rituals, literally means “(ritual for) undoing of it (i.e of the portended evil)” or “apotropaeon," where the Sumerian possessive suffix BI was originally a reference to a preceding omen apodosis. The impending catastrophe identified in the apodosis was to be averted by the implementation of an apotropaic ritual. In addition to dissolution NAM-BÚR-BI, it is also a generic name for rituals, NAM-BÚR written phonetically as nappulu in late Babylonian sources. In a few ritual descriptions of the 1st millennium BC, the caption NAM-BÚR-BI is found with its general, rather than the more specific "apotropaic ritual" context.

=== Sources ===
The collection of NAM-BÚR-BI rituals is one of the largest genera of the ritual cuneiform tradition. Zimri-Lim of Mari’s officials sent rare ants and a sheep abortion to their king as evidence of omens and Maul suggests that these could be interpreted as indicating that these were needed for a NAM-BÚR-BI ritual. The oldest extant descriptions of the actual rituals, although without the appended moniker NAM-BÚR-BI, come from the royal archives of the Hittite capital Ḫattuša. It is probable that similar but as yet unrecovered texts were in use during the old Babylonian period in Mesopotamia proper. All other tablets with NAM-BÚR-BI rituals are of neo-Assyrian origin, from Nineveh, Aššur, Huzirina and Kalhu, or neo- and late-Babylonian, such as those excavated at Uruk.

In addition to its original form as a supplement to inscribed omen collections such as Šumma ālu, NAM-BÚR-BI rituals are part of a compendium in their own right, and appear in their own collections of tablets. Ashurbanipal assembled for his personal use the NAM.BÚR.BI.MES series, which consisted of more than 135 tablets, but much of it is lost. Catalogues of apotropaic rituals are known from Nineveh and from Uruk.

=== Subject matter ===
The greatest numbers of apotropaic ritual were to counteract terrestrial signs observed in nature, in the immediate vicinity and workspace of the subject, in and near the house of a man, and in the field of agriculture and animal husbandry. This has led to the supposition that their origin may have been in rites of the rural population. Several rituals are known to divert the omens from birds and snakes displaying mischief. Others counter the portents from observations of domestic animals, wildlife and desert animals, rodents, reptiles, scorpions and insects, including a general namburbi for the omen series Šumma izbu. A small part of the corpus of rituals, served to counter the misfortune presaged by weather phenomena.

There are strikingly few namburbi rituals to counter astrological omens, as a neo-Assyrian letter records: “A solar eclipse of two fingers magnitude took place during the sunrise. There is no apotropaic ritual against it.” Some apotropaic rituals (“universal namburbis”) could be directed against any form of augury, ḪUL DÙ.A.BI, “every evil.”

The various aims of the ritual included the placating of divine anger, the persuasion of gods to change the omenistic verdict, the removal of all impurity, a return to normalcy, and the rendering of permanent protection.

=== The ritual ===
Colophons of namburbi tablets and letters from writers and astrologers of the Assyrian kings Esarhaddon and Assurbanipal show that it was the role of the ašipu, “exorcist,” to plan and implement the apotropaic rituals. If a sign had been recognized as foreboding, the gods Ea and his son Asalluḫi, Šamaš, the sun god and god of justice (mīšaru), and often the deity, in whose sphere of influence the prognostication had occurred - were invoked, and offered a meal of bread, meat, dates, incense, water and beer to appease the source of the portent and effect a change in outcome. Clay figurines were fashioned and a Šuilla, or “show of hands prayer,” was delivered to implore divine mercy.

During the preliminary purification stage, the subject and conjuror conducting the ritual abstained from eating watercress, onions, leeks or fish. Water was consecrated under the stars and with all manner of cleansing substances. Small altars were erected by the riverside in a “place difficult of access.” The person infected with the evil (lumnu) was led to a spot strewn with garden herbs (šammū kirî) behind one of the altars and a clay figurine representing the harbinger of the omen was laid before them. The conjuror then performed the incantation, often climaxing by shattering a clay pot, and the subject was washed with the consecrated water, which was afterward poured over the figurine, to return the impurity to its source. A variety of symbolic actions could follow, including cutting the subjects hair, fingernails, stripping off his coat, peeling an onion or unwinding a thread to represent the dissolution of the fate. The figurine was then cast into the river, "down to the apsû." Measures were taken to avoid reinfection, with the subject perhaps wearing an amulet and returning home via a different route from that taken prior to the ritual.

The profound psychological effect of the release ritual cannot be underestimated. For the private individual it would have had a deep impression, akin to absolution, but to a monarch it may have altered his behavior. By ridding the impending evil inherent in a bad omen, a namburbi “bolstered the king’s self-confidence, strengthened his resolution, and steeled his will to fight.” An entire staff of conjurors organized like a ministry, poured over omen collections and prepared rituals to counter any portent that was diagnosed. A namburbi was a central part of the substitute king ritual.
