= Great Prayer to Šamaš =

Ancient Mesopotamian literary composition

The Great Prayer to Šamaš is a piece of Akkadian literature.
