= Babylonian Theodicy =

Ancient Babylonian wisdom poem from 1600 – 900 BC

The Babylonian Theodicy is an Akkadian poem from ancient Babylonia dated to 1600 – 900 BC which examines the subjects of human suffering, the problem of evil, and the possibility of a moral universe. The poem is an example of wisdom literature of the Ancient Near East in the form of a dialogue between two speakers on a philosophical subject; as such, it is thematically and formally very similar to the Book of Job in the Hebrew Bible.

The "Babylonian Theodicy" is written in Akkadian cuneiform on a clay tablet; its dating is based on linguistic evidence. The poem has also been called "An Akkadian dialogue on the unrighteousness of the world" or "The Babylonian Ecclesiastes (Koheleth)."

== Content ==
The "Babylonian Theodicy" is a dialogue between two friends. One of the friends is suffering; he recounts the evil acts of people in the society around him. The sufferer's friend argues that the universe must be just because it was made by a divinity.

The poem begins:

O sage...come let me speak to you...let me recount to you...

The suffering friend recounts his grief, called lumnu libbi in Akkadian; the literal translation is "evil of the heart". The sufferer attributes his grief and emotional pain to his having been orphaned and abandoned when very young. He is confused by his suffering, and finds no satisfactory explanation for his misfortune. The sufferer hopes for emotional purgation, i.e., catharsis, once a compassionate listener hears his tale. The sufferer concludes by addressing his friend:

....behold my grief—help me, look on my distress; know it.

and asking for divine aid:

May the god who has thrown me off give help, may the goddess who has [abandoned me] show mercy, for the shepherd Šamaš guides the peoples like a god.

== Structure ==
The "The Babylonian Theodicy" was composed as an acrostic. Each horizontal line's initial syllabic sign, when read together vertically, spell out words which constitute a passage or message. The poem is composed of 27 stanzas with each stanza consisting of 11 lines. The acrostic spells out the passage:

I, Saggil-kīnam-ubbib, the incantation priest, am adorant of the god and king

a-na-ku sa-ag-gi-il-ki-[i-na-am-u]b-bi-ib ma-áš-ma-šu ka-ri-bu ša i-li ú šar-ri

== Dating ==
The earliest manuscripts containing "The Babylonian Theodicy" text date from the reign of the Assyrian king Ashurbanipal (669 – 631 BC). Linguistic clues suggest that it was composed after the Kassite period (c. 1500 – 1100 BC); more precise estimates date it to 1000 BC.

== See also ==
- Adad-apla-iddina
- Akkadian literature
- Ancient literature
- Ludlul bēl nēmeqi
- Nebuchadnezzar I
- Problem of evil (section Responses, defences and theodicies)
- Šamaš
- Theodicy
