= Asakkū marṣūtu =

Namtaru lemnu asakkū marṣūtu, inscribed NAM.TAR ḪUL.GÁL Á.SÀG GIG.GA, is an ancient Mesopotamian medical treatise from the first millennium BC which concerns the “grievous asakku-demons” and the diseases they cause. Originally stretching to at least twelve tablets, it is only partially extant, with parts of around eight of the tablets from the Library of Ashurbanipal in Nineveh and a copy of tablet 3 from the temple of Nabȗ in Nimrud, ancient Kalhu. It is recorded, with a somewhat different gloss than one might have expected, in the Exorcists Manual: di-‘u GIG-tu_{4}, di’u marṣūtu, betraying its intended purpose in the combat of the demons and the cure of the ailment they were supposed to have caused, “fever sickness,” a grave disease characterized by a headache, possibly malaria.

== The text ==
The sickness that afflicts the patient is described asakku marṣu ina zumur amēli ittabši, “the dangerous asakku-demon has settled in the body of the man.” It invokes the metaphor of clothing: amēla muttallika kīma ṣubāti iktatam, “he [the asakku-demon] enveloped the miserable man like a garment”; and that of a force of nature: asakku kīma mīli nāru isḫup, “the asakku-demon overwhelmed [him] like the flood of a river.”

The text includes several ritual procedures for combating epidemic fevers and these often involve the manipulation of goats or their offspring. One example involves the placement of a kid on the head of the patient. Piglets (ŠAḪ.TUR.RA) are also sacrificed in pursuit of relief.
