= Sag-gig-ga-meš =

Ancient Mesopotamian collection of magical prescriptions

The incantation series inscribed in cuneiform Sumerograms as ÉN SAG.GIG.GA.MEŠ, Akkadian: muruṣ qaqqadi, “headache” (literally “sick-head”), is an ancient Mesopotamian nine-tablet collection of magical prescriptions against the demon that caused grave disease characterized by a headache. Some of its incantations seem to have become incorporated into the later Assyrian work muššu’u, “rubbing”. It is listed on the ninth line of the KAR44, the work known as the Exorcists Manual, a compendium of the works of the āšipūtu, craft of exorcism, prefixed by the gloss sa.kik.ke_{4}, a phonetic rendition of the series’ opening incipit, én sag-gig é-kur-ta nam-ta-è.

== The text ==
Prescriptions against headache have a long tradition within Mesopotamian folk remedy. The Kassite-era physician Rabâ-ša-Marduk authored “Eighteen prescriptions for headache”.

Like many of the other canonical collections of incantations and rituals, Sag-gig-ga-meš probably achieved its final form in the first millennium BC where it was copied down until the Hellenistic period. Its first five incipits are known from a fragmentary catalog.

Tablet 8 describes a change in mental status (ṭēmu) that the person becomes detached from his body: "They (the demons) altered his mental state, so that he forgets his own flesh." In the ritual part of the text, a lamb is offered up for immolation as a substitute for the sick man.

=== Primary publications ===
- R. Campbell Thompson (1903). Cuneiform Texts from Babylonian Tablets, &c. in the British Museum, Part XVII (CT 17). British Museum. pp. 4–8, 25–26. line art.
- R. Campbell Thompson (1904). The Devils and Evil Spirits of Babylonia, Vol. 2. Luzac and Co. pp. 44–97. transliteration and translation
- Adam Falkenstein (1931). Die Haupttypen Der Sumerischen Beschwörung: Literarisch Untersucht. Zentralantiquariat der DDR. pp. 13f.
- Deirdre Linton (1970). The series Sag.gig.ga.meš and related incantations. University of Birmingham Dissertation.
- H. Hunger (1975). "Zur Ordnung der diagnostischen Omenserie". ZA (65): 63–68.
