= Dialogue of Pessimism =

Ancient Mesopotamian dialogue

The Dialogue of Pessimism is an ancient Mesopotamian literary composition in the form of a dialogue between a master and his slave. Its interpretations have varied, but it is generally considered an unusual text which thematises the futility of human action. It is an example of ancient Near Eastern wisdom literature.

== Text and dating ==
The Dialogue is a loosely poetic composition in Akkadian, written soon after 1000 BC in Mesopotamia. It was discovered in five different clay tablet manuscripts written in the cuneiform script. The text is well-preserved, as only 15 of its 86 lines are fragmentary. Two textual versions seem to survive, as a Babylonian tablet is substantially different from Assyrian versions. Ancient audiences may have known it by the Akkadian title arad mitanguranni ("slave, attend me"), the phrase at the beginning of every stanza.

== Publication and title ==
The text was first published by G. Reisner in 1896, followed by the works of E. Ebeling between 1917 and 1919. However, the title "Dialogue of Pessimism" was only attributed by Stephen Herbert Langdon in his 1923 article "The Babylonian dialogue of pessimism." Jacyntho Lins Brandão believes that the fact that this title has prevailed demonstrates a certain bias in interpretation, and suggests that the text should be seen as a "dialogue of hesitation."

== Content and style ==
The Dialogue of Pessimism takes the form of a dialogue between a master and his slave valet. In each of the first ten stanzas the master proposes a course of action, for which the slave provides good reasons. Each time, however, the master changes his mind and the slave provides equally good reasons for not pursuing that course of action. The courses of action are:

I. Driving to the palace

II. Dining

III. Hunting

IV. Marriage ("building a house" in Speiser)

V. Litigation (this is the most fragmentary stanza)

VI. Leading a revolution ("commit a crime" in Speiser)

VII. Sexual intercourse

VIII. Sacrifice

IX. Making investments ("plant crops" in Speiser)

X. Public service

A sample of the Dialogue is (Master Slave):

Slave, listen to me! Here I am, master, here I am!
I want to make love to a woman! Make love, master, make love!
The man who makes love forgets sorrow and fear!
O well, slave, I do not want to make love to a woman.
Do not make love, master, do not make love.
Woman is a real pitfall, a hole, a ditch,
Woman is a sharp iron dagger that cuts a man's throat.
(Stanza VII, lines 46–52)

Stanza XI is substantially different:

Slave, listen to me! Here I am, master, here I am!
What then is good?
To have my neck and yours broken,
or to be thrown into the river, is that good?
Who is so tall as to ascend to heaven?
Who is so broad as to encompass the entire world?
O well, slave! I will kill you and send you first!
Yes, but my master would certainly not survive me for three days.
(Lines 79–86)

The dialogue is limited to two people (unlike, for instance, Plato's dialogues), as is common in ancient Near Eastern wisdom literature. It has much in common with the local tradition of dispute literature, including its cynical, questioning outlook. As with other dispute poems, it may have been performed orally outside the school setting. Rather than a set of abstract or universal principles to be applied to every situation, the slave employs concrete images and instances.

The dialogue also references Mesopotamian literature of other sorts. Line 76 quotes a line at the beginning and the end of the Epic of Gilgamesh. Lines 86–87 quote an ancient Sumerian saying. Lines 62–69 may allude to a part of the Great Hymn to Shamash (lines 118–127).

== Interpretation ==
Interpretation of the Dialogue is divided. Some consider the Dialogue a theodicy. Others consider it a statement of life's absurdity, because there are no definitive right and wrong choices or reasons for action. The final stanza is therefore a logical outcome of this quandary, the choice of non-existence over existential futility. This has led recent interpreters to compare the Dialogue to modern existentialists such as Kierkegaard and Camus.

An opposing interpretation takes its cue from the slave's final cheeky retort, seeing the Dialogue as social satire. By this view, the boisterous slave exposes the vacillation and unproductiveness of his aristocratic master through giving conflicting and clichéd answers. Religious satire may also be present in comments about the behaviour of the gods.

Parallels with the second-millennium Mesopotamian text Monologue of the Righteous Sufferer (also known as "I will praise the Lord of Wisdom") and the biblical Book of Ecclesiastes suggest a third interpretation. The universe is indeed enigmatic, even seeming meaningless, but it may have some rationale known to the gods (suggested in the slave's comment about heaven and earth in Stanza XI). Rather than counselling death out of despair, the master wants the slave to enter before him into death so that he can ask the gods. The slave's final satirical rejoinder parries his master's suggestion. The Dialogue may be satirical, serious, or both, but by this view its message is that the gods control the destinies, which are unknown to us. The wise man, like the slave, reserves judgement and assesses possibilities in the face of life's ambiguities, albeit retaining his sense of humour.

== Parallels with the Old Testament ==
There is a thematic parallel between the Dialogue of Pessimism and the Book of Ecclesiastes in the Old Testament. The affirmations and their negations given by the Dialogue's slave are similar to the list of actions and their opposites given in Ecclesiastes 3:1-9 ("a time to be born and a time to die..."). Ecclesiastes, like the Dialogue, has been the subject of pessimistic and optimistic interpretations, and is also amenable to the interpretation that the incomprehensibility of the universe and human life point to our limitations and the transcendent knowledge of God.

There are also some parallels and contrasts with the Book of Job. Like the Dialogue, Job also considers death as an option in the face of life's contradictions (Job 3:2–13), although he never contemplates suicide. Moreover, Job does not conclude on a note of death: rather, that theme was more present at the outset. The use of irony and satire to probe life's mysteries also feature in both the Dialogue and Job (e.g. Job 9:39–31).

A proverb appearing at the end of the dialogue, "who is so tall as to ascend to the heavens? who is so broad as to encompass the entire world?" has several biblical parallels, among which are the opening verse of the proverbs of Agur (Proverbs 30:4); Deuteronomy 30:11-14; Job 11:7-9; and Job 28:12-18. (Note: Jacyntho Lins Brandão notes a parallel between these verses and Version A of Bilgames and Huwawa: "um homem não pode estender-se até o céu, não importa quão alto,/ um homem não pode abarcar uma montanha, não importa quão largo." ("a man cannot reach up to heaven, no matter how high,/ a man cannot embrace a mountain, no matter how wide."))

== Text ==
- II.4 Dialogue of Pessimism Critical edition and translation of the text (electronic Babylonian Library).
- Anonymous (2021). "Arad mitanguranni" [Slave, attend me!]. Nota do Tradutor (in Akkadian). No. 23. Desterro: Revista de Tradução Literária e Biblioteca Digital. pp. 62–67. ISSN 2177-5141.

== Bibliography ==
- Bottéro, J. (1992). Mesopotamia: Writing, Reasoning, and the Gods. Chicago. (Especially "The Dialogue of Pessimism and Transcendence", pp. 251–267.)
- Brandão, Jacyntho Lins (2022). "Diálogo do Pessimismo ou Elogio da Hesitação" [Dialogue of Pessimism or Praise of Hesitation]. Phoînix (in Brazilian Portuguese). 28 (2). Rio de Janeiro: Laboratório de História Antiga: 14–47. doi:10.26770/phoinix.v28n2a1. ISSN 2527-225X. S2CID 255333094.
- Denning-Bolle, S. J. (1987). Wisdom and Dialogue in the Ancient Near East. Numen 34 (2): 214–234.
- Hartley, J. E. (2008). Job 2: Ancient Near Eastern Background. In T. Longman III & P. Enns (Eds.), Dictionary of the Old Testament: Wisdom, Poetry & Writings. Inter-Varsity Press: 316–361.
- Jacobsen, T. (1948). The Negation of All Values: A Dialogue of Pessimism. In H. & H. A. Frankfort, J. A. Wilson, & T. Jacobsen, Before Philosophy: The Intellectual Adventure of Ancient Man. Penguin: 231–234.
- Helle, S. (2017). Babylonian Perspectives on the Uncertainty of Death: SB Gilgamesh X 301-321. KASKAL 14: 211–219.
- Hurowitz, V. A. (2007). An Allusion to the Šamaš Hymn in the Dialogue of Pessimism. In R. J. Clifford (Ed.), Wisdom Literature in Mesopotamia and Israel. Society of Biblical Literature: 33–36.
- Kim, K. (2008). Lemuel and Agur. In T. Longman III & P. Enns (Eds.), Dictionary of the Old Testament: Wisdom, Poetry & Writings. Inter-Varsity Press: 427–431.
- Lambert, W. G. (1960). The Dialogue of Pessimism. In ibid., Babylonian Wisdom Literature. Oxford: 139–149.
- Metcalf, C. (2013). Babylonian Perspectives on the Certainty of Death. KASKAL 10: 255–267.
- Speiser, E. A. "The Case of the Obliging Servant." Journal of Cuneiform Studies 8 (3): 98–105.
- Samet, N. (2008). The Babylonian Dialogue between a Master and His Slave: A New Literary Analysis. Shnaton 23: 99–130.
- Samet, N. (2010). The Tallest Man Cannot Reach Heaven, The Broadest Man Cannot Cover Earth - Reconsidering the Proverb and Its Biblical Parallels. Journal of Hebrew Scripture 10, article 8.
- van der Toorn, K. (1991). The Ancient Near Eastern literary dialogue as a vehicle of critical reflection. In G. J. Reinink & H. L. J. Vanstiphout (Eds.), Dispute Poems and Dialogues in the Ancient and Mediaeval Middle East: 59-75. OLA 42; Leuven: Peeters.
