= Šumma sinništu qaqqada rabât =

Ancient Mesopotamian collection of physiognomic omens

The text with the incipit protasis Šumma sinništu qaqqada rabât, inscribed in cuneiform: DIŠ MUNUS SAG.DU GAL-at, “If a Woman is Large of Head” (apodosis: išarru, “she will prosper’), is an ancient Mesopotamian collection of physiognomic omens, or oracles based on a woman's anatomical features, where the apodosis either predicts the fortune of the individual or makes snap judgements about them based on their physical appearance. It is an Akkadian two-tablet composition dedicated to a woman's prognostication and is often considered a subsection or extension of the greater twenty-seven tablet work, Alamdimmû, concerning physiognomic omens in general.

== Synopsis ==
The text as we now have it extends to around 265 lines based on the collation of four extant fragmentary exemplars. It seems to have been intended to draw a comparison between a woman's physical traits and her later, post-marital, personality, thus enabling a suitor to predict her suitability for betrothal. The ideal characteristics do not necessarily represent beauty, as “a propitious woman can be quite homely or downright ugly.” The features of the body are arranged, ištu muḫḫi adi šēpē, from head to foot, a characteristic of other works edited by the 11th Century BC ummânū, or chief scholar, Esagil-kin-apli, in whose late Babylonian catalogue it appears listed with three catch-lines, where features on the left are generally auspicious and those on the right are not from the point of view of the observer.

The text is divided by horizontal lines into subsections, each with the theme of a body-part, including hands, fingers, chest, breasts, nipples, belly, navel, vaginal labia and toes. A typical sample of the text's contents is given by this series of omens based on the first of these:

šumma sinništum qātāša ba՚lā bit dulli ippuš
šumma qattanā muštamriṣat
šumma arkā išarru ilānât
šumma karâ ulappan

If a woman's hands are abnormally large, she will build a house of labor/misery
If they are small, she is a hypochondriac
If they are long, she will be rich, she is divine
If they are short, she will be poor

— Lines 100-103

Towards the end of the work it moves to describe portents concerning the appearance of the whole body:

If the forehead glows, a tooth protrudes, the nose is straight, the lips are thin, the chin is flat, hands and feet are pointed, (and) she is covered with ḫalû and umṣatu-marks, ... this woman ..., she is near to the god, she is cheerful, barley and silver are set in place for her, she will acquire barley and silver, her days are long, (and) a basket she will not carry before her.

— Lines 250-255

=== Primary publication ===
- Barbara Böck (2000). Die babylonisch-Assyrische Morphoskopie (AfOB 27). Institut für Orientalistik der Universität Wien. pp. 148–173.
