= Iqqur Ipuš =

Akkadian almanac of omens

Iqqur Ipuš (“he destroyed, he built”) is an ancient Mesopotamian menology, first described as "An Almanac from ancient Babylonia", a work recording favorable and inauspicious months in which one might choose to carry out a wide variety of enterprises, such as building works, ritual activities, etc. It exists in two forms, ordered by activity (“série générale”) and by month (“série mensuelles”), providing lists and tables for easy reckoning and was probably composed during the last third of the second millennium. Together with the astrological work, Astrolabe B, it is the most distinctly menological work within Mesopotamian literature.

== The menology ==
The work contains hundreds of omens in a hundred and five sections linked to the Mesopotamian calendar. Two different recensions of Iqqur īpuš are known: the série mensuelle, which groups the prognoses of the series according to the month they refer to; and the série générale, in which prognoses for each month are given under the title of the activity or event in question. The first sixty six sections of Iqqur Ipuš ordered by activity concern those of daily human life, such as “If a man digs a well, … in the month of Ajar, then he will be in want of grain…”, “If a child is born in the month of Abu, that child will be despondent”, while the last third of the text concerns natural phenomena, such as meteorological events, like thunder: "When Adad hurls his voice". Like the series Enuma Anu Enlil, it contains many astrological omens, such as those concerning earthquakes and the rising of Venus, but its relationship with this prominent work is otherwise uncertain.

The Assyrian royal hemerology, “Fruit, Lord of the month”, excerpts several of its omina, but with a man replaced by a king and a house by a palace.

=== Primary publication ===
- E. F. Weidner (1957). Ein Hauskalender aus dem alten Babylonien. RSO 32. pp. 185–196.
- R. Labat (1965). Un calendrier babylonien des travaux des signes et des mois (series iqqur ipuš). Librairie Honoré Champion.
