= Babylonian Almanac =

The Babylonian Almanac is a source of information for predictions, i.e., an almanac, made for astronomical phenomena for the specific years contained within it.

The work comes entirely from manuscripts, of which fifty-two were discovered. Of these, there are significant variations in certain lines of the ancient texts.
