= Ninurta-Pāqidāt's Dog Bite =

Ninurta-Pāqidāt's Dog Bite, also known as The Tale of the Illiterate Doctor in Nippur, is a text in Akkadian cuneiform, recorded on clay Tablet W 23558 - IM 78552, from the reign of King Marduk-balassu-iqbi of Babylon. It includes one of the earliest examples of scatological humour.

== The man from Nippur and the priest from Isin ==
According to its colophon, it was written "for educating apprentice scribes of Uruk," It has garnered much academic attention, since it was first published in 1979 by Antoine Cavigneaux when "the text was not properly understood", from which it can be inferred he did not understand the joke. A certain Ninurta-Pāqidāt, the brother of Ninurta-ša-kunnâ-irammu and nephew of Enlil-Nippuru-ana-ašrišu-ter (both absurd names), of Nippur was bitten by a dog, the symbol of Gula, the goddess of healing. He sought help from Amel-Baba, a priest from Isin, who, after reciting the appropriate anti-rabies incantation:

Incantation (against diseases) of the house of [the god] Ea: Concerning a man whom a snake attacks, or a scorpion attacks, or a rabid dog attacks, and to whom it passes its venom ... (The water) shall be cleansed in his pure tube. Cast the spell into the water! Feed the water to the patient, so that the venom itself can go out (of the body).

== Journey to Nippur and miscommunication ==
Amel-Baba must travel to Nippur to collect his fee. On arrival, he encounters Bēltīya-šarrat-Apsî ("who tends the garden called Abundance of Enlil and sits [at a] plot on Right Street selling vegetables"), the daughter of Ra'im-kini-Marduk, who insists in communicating with him in Sumerian (the language of ancient Nippur many centuries earlier), causing much misunderstanding when he mistakes her for mocking him and is threatened with being driven out of town by an outraged mob of apprentice scribes with their buns (clay practice tablets). Despite the efforts of generations of Assyriologists, such as Erica Reiner ("Why do you cuss me?"), the punch-line remained elusive, until the Sumerian response, en.nu.dúr.me-en, was translated as "O (my) lord, I am a farter," thus identifying the piece as an early exemplar of lavatorial humor.
