= Series of Ox and Horse =

Work of Akkadian Literature

The Series of Ox and Horse is an Akkadian disputation poem. It contains a poetic dispute between an ox and a horse and perhaps other animals. Around 200 mostly fragmentary verses are known, but it is uncertain how long the text originally was, or in which order the preserved fragments should be arranged.

The text opens with a mythological introduction describing the arrival of the spring, which provides the occasio litingadi (cause of quarrel): in the lush pastures an ox and a horse meet and decide to dispute, simply for pleasure's sake. Nine speeches of Ox and eight of Horse are preserved, concerned with a variety of topics. In the opening salvo (A+25–A+37), Ox claims that, whereas he enjoys the pasture and his calves gambol in it during the spring, Horse gruffly tramples it. In one speech, Horse (B+1–B+12) scoffs at Ox for being a pack animal; both Horse and Ox brag of their proximity to kings and princes (Ox in F+2; Horse in A+6 and C+11).

== Manuscripts ==
Seven pieces of this series, all of them from Ashurbanipal's libraries, are known. None of the pieces duplicate each other, and they can be identified solely on the basis of the presence of one of the two speech introduction formulae of the series: "Horse answered and spake a word unto the heroic Ox saying" and "Ox answered and spake unto Horse, the expert in war." The Series, as well as the incipit of one of its chapters are mentioned among other disputation poems in the inventory tablet Rm.618. Nothing is known about the genesis of the text, but since some hippological lexemes are otherwise attested only in Middle Babylonian documents, the Series was probably composed in the second half of the second millennium BCE.

The most recent edition of the series was published in the 1960s, although most fragments had already been edited in the 1920s, many of them were also in G. Smith's pioneering edition in the 1870s.
