= Šà.zi.ga =

Mesopotamian incantations to cure impotence

Šà.zi.ga are a set of incantations of Mesopotamian origin, used to cure impotence, or return sexual potency to a person.
