= Bārûtu =

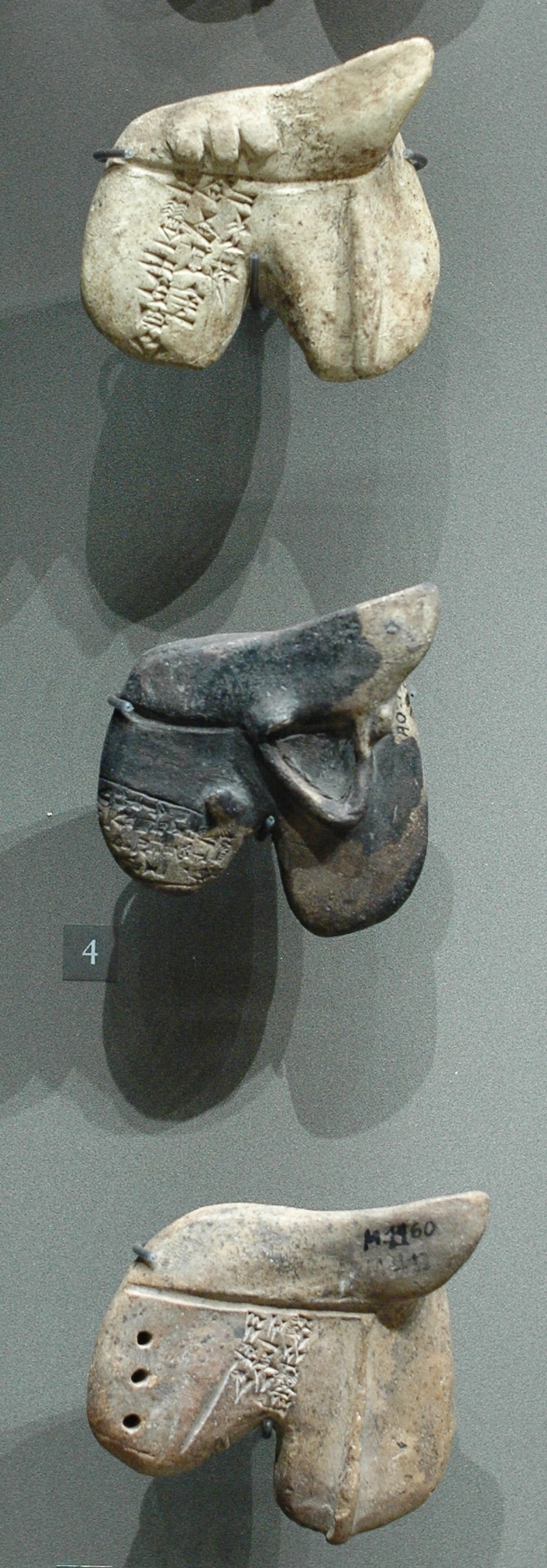
Divinatory livers, clay models for the training of soothsayers, in the Louvre.

The Bārûtu, the “art of the diviner,” is a monumental ancient Mesopotamian compendium of the science of extispicy or sacrificial omens stretching over around a hundred cuneiform tablets which was assembled in the Neo-Assyrian/Babylonian period based upon earlier recensions. At the Assyrian court, the term extended to encompass sacrificial prayers and rituals, commentaries and organ models. The ikribu was the name of collections of incantations to accompany the extispicy. The bārûtu's extant predecessors date back to Old Babylonian times with the liver models from Mari (pictured right) and where the order of the exta were largely fixed.

The task of the bārû, or diviner, was summarized as lipit qāti hiniq immeri naqē niqē nēpešti bārûti, “the ‘touch of hand’, the restriction^{?} of the sheep, the offering of the sacrifice, the performance of extispicy.” This required elaborate ritual purity, achieved through washing hands and mouth, donning fresh clothing, placing tamarisk and cedar into the diviner's ears, anointing and fumigation with sulfur – all measures to avoid the outcome of the apodosis lā ellu niqâ ilput, “an unclean person has touched the sacrifice.” The autopsy then proceeded in a counter-clockwise direction, beginning with the liver, the lungs, then the breastbone, vertebrae, ribs, colon and finally the heart.

== The text ==
The work is particularly difficult to interpret due to the extensive use of graphemes, but included an estimated 8,000 omens. These were the accumulation of a millennium and a half of observations of political, social and private events and the divinatory signs that accompanied them but bereft of their chronological context or other identifying marker and stylistically posed in the form of a prediction. Occasionally, an attribution is made to a king, but it is generally archaic:

- "Omen of Šarru-kīn whose troops were shut in by a rainstorm and exchanged weapons among themselves" (padānu tablet 4),
- “Omen of king Amar-Su’ena, who was gored by an ox, but died from the bite of a shoe [i.e., an infection of the foot]” (padānu commentary),
- “Omen of king Tiriqqan, who in the midst of his army took flight” (pān tākalti tablet 6),
- “Omen of king Rimuš, whom his courtiers killed with their seals” (pān tākalti tablet 13), or
- “Omen of the Apišalian, whom Narām-Sîn captured by tunnelling.”

Some of the signs are identified as pitruštu, “ambiguous,” or by another "wild card" nipḫu, "unreliable," while others echo modern concerns, šatammu ekalla imallalu, “the accountants will plunder the palace!” Some predict the weather: enūma lullik šamū ikallâni, “whenever I want to go out rain will stop me.” Some give quite specific predictions, edû rākib imēru irruba, “a famous person will arrive riding on a donkey,” while others are vague, ina ūmi rūqi rigmu, “long-term forecast: lament.” Some predict li'ibu-, masla'tu- or qūqānu-disease or other disorders: “If the pleasing word is split above and below: the man’s teeth will come loose.” The majority of the omens, however, concern royal and military affairs.

=== The parts of the bārûtu ===
The barūtû is divided into ten “chapters” (summarized in the table below), each dealing with a different aspect of entrail divination, but predominantly concerned with the examination of the ṭuppu ša ilī, the "tablet of the gods," or the liver (amūtu). The Babylonian and Assyrian versions vary slightly in arrangement due to the Babylonian predilection for sixty line tablets.

Cuneiform	Akkadian	Name	Subject	Tablet count
BE GIŠ.DAL	šumma išru	The "fetlocks" (kursinnu) or "thighs"?	Also includes: KIŠIB.MEŠ (kunukkū), the "seal (impression)" = vertebrae, KAK.TI (sikkat ṣēli) the rib cage, najabtu, "the peg" or the floating ribs and; GAG.(=KAK.)ZAG.GA (kaskāsu), the breastbone	4
BE ŠÀ.NIGIN	šumma tirānu	The "intestines"	Parts of the sheep other than the liver and lungs, and includes the coils or convolutions of the sacrificial animal's colon and the kidneys (BIR, kalītu)	8
BE NA	šumma manzāzu	The "presence" or "station"	The liver examination commences with the groove or reticular impression on the liver's lobus sinister, known as the IGI.BAR or KI.GUB (naplastum), in the Old Babylonian period	6
BE GÍR	šumma padānu	The "path"	Another groove on the liver's lobus sinister, the abomasal impression on the ventral lobe perpendicular to the "station"	6
BE IGI.TÙN	šumma pān tākalti	The "front of the pouch"	A series of obscure features of the facies visceralis consisting of twelve subsections: -: NÍG.TAB (maṣraḫ naṣrapti), the "dyeing vat" or "crucible" (the impressio abomalis); KA.DÙG.GA (pû ṭābu), the "pleasing word", another groove on the lobus sinister; KALAG (danānu), "strength" (ligamentum teres hepatis); ME.NI/KÁ.É.GAL (bāb ekalli), "palace gate" (umbilical fissure or incisura ligamenti teretis); SILIM (šulmu), "well-being" (lobus quandratus); GÍR 15 ZÉ (padān imitti marti), "path to the right of the gall-bladder", a groove on the lobus quadratus; GÍR 150 ZÉ (padān šumēl marti), "path to the left of the gall-bladder," another groove on the lobus quadratus; ŠUB-AŠ.TE/ŠUB-(GIŠ)GU.ZA (nīddi kussî), "base of the throne" (impressio renalis?); NE MU (uncertain meaning), TÙR (tarbaṣ), "cattle fold" and kiṣirti, the "ridges", omentum minus; MÁŠ (ṣibtu), "increase" (processus papillaris); DU_{8} 2, 30, the "left fissure", ZI 150 (tīb šumēlim) the "left rise" and tīb šāri "rise of the wind"; Ni-ri (nīru), "yoke" (impressio omasica)	15
BE ZÉ	šumma martu	The "gall bladder"	Divided into the “tip” (appu), “top” (rēšu), “middle” (qablu), “bottom” (išdu), “narrow part” (qutnu), and maṣrahu or cystic duct.	10
BE ŠU.SI	šumma ubānu	The "finger"	The "head of the liver," the caudate lobe or caput iecoris on the left side of the liver, which was subdivided into the regions: the "land" (KUR), the "median area" (ṣēr bīrīti) and; the "palace" (ekallu)	11
BE GIŠ.TUKUL	šumma kakku	The "weapon" or "fortuitous markings"	A small piece of liver tissue that sticks out in the form of a club or peg	8+
BE ḪAR (=MUR)	šumma ḫašu	The “lungs”	Including the ‘middle finger’ (ubān hašî qablītu), or the accessory lobe of the right lung, and the “cap” (kubšu), or apical lobe^{?} of the lung	15
BE mul-ta-bil-tum	šumma multābiltu	"Analysis", i.e., the “one who interprets”	Treats with the rules of association, ambiguous signs, extraordinary appearances and the šumma amūtu omens, for the liver as a whole	17

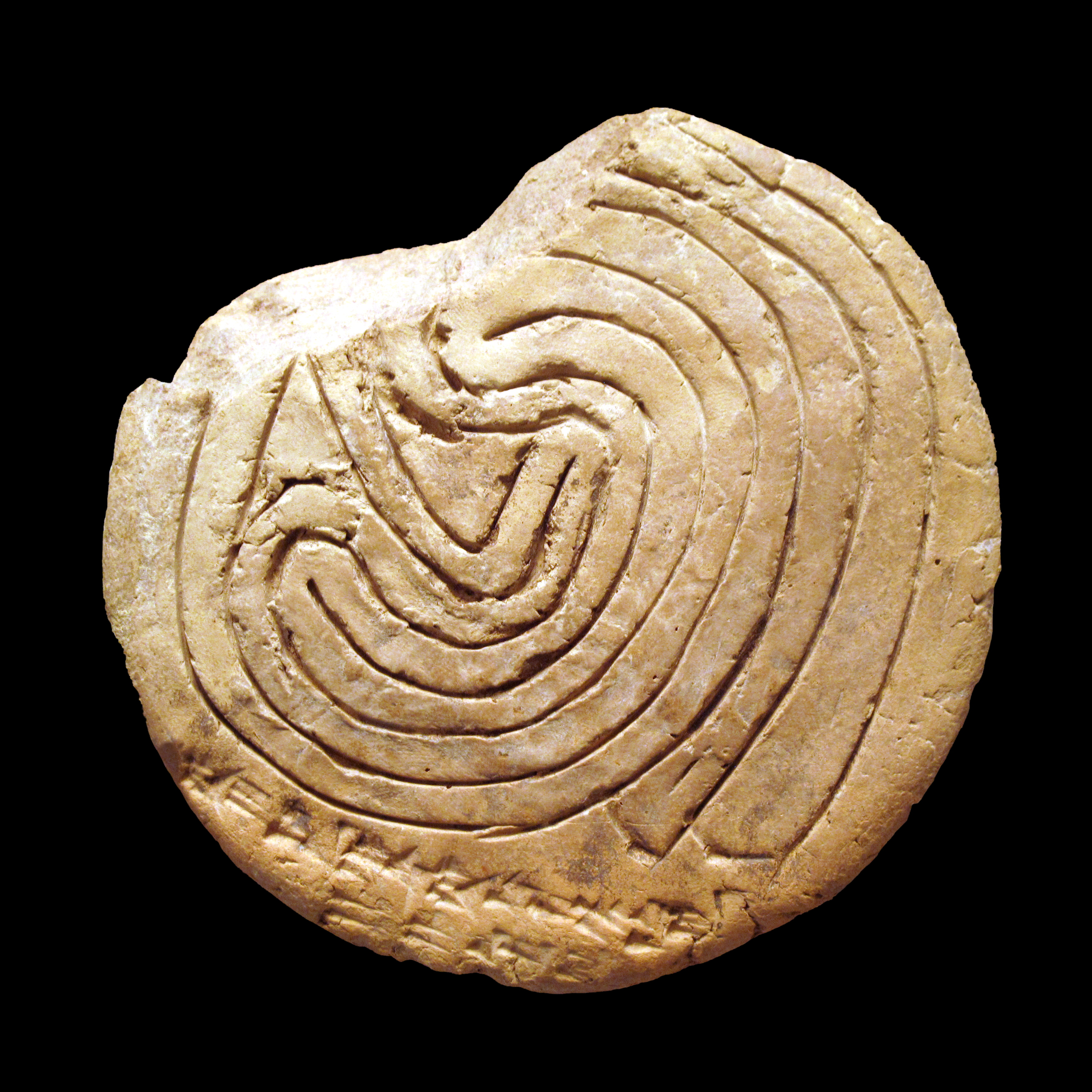
Clay tablet representing the bowels of a sheep. The inscription reads: "Left and right meet on the right, and meet an end here", in the Louvre.

Commentaries exist for each part called NÍG.PÀD.DA (mukallimtu) typically bringing together omens with similar protases from each chapter. The niṣirti bārûti, “secret of extispicy”, texts, predating the multābiltu chapter of the bārûtu and subsequently superseded by it, endeavored to elucidate the esoteric character of the omens. Excerpts or compendia were written to make the manual more user-friendly, such as that known as KAR 423 after its primary publication reference, and it was these truncated versions of the omens that seem to have been consulted during the actual divination process. The dub ḫa.la tablets concern the “calculation of the stipulated term”, or the time and duration of the omen. The šumma immeru records observations derived from scholarly debates relating to the behavior of sacrificial lambs before and during the ritual and there were also “orientation tables” in the form of extispicy models (example pictured right) and interpretive grids to assist with the training of bārû.

=== The copyists ===
The compendium seems to have been under progressive editorship as witnessed in correspondence of the senior diviners Marduk-šumu-uṣur and Naṣiru, and Tabni, who collectively advised king Esarhaddon that

The series should be rev[ised]. Let the king command: two ‘long’ tablets containing explanations, or antiquated words should be removed, and two tablets of the haruspices’ corpus should be put (instead).

In 647 BC, at least 135 writing boards of bārûtu were expropriated from private collections, many from Bīt Ibâ, the subject of a Babylonian revolt. Captive scribal labor was employed at the Assyrian capital to contribute to the local material assimilated from older libraries such as those of Nabû-zuqup-kēnu, who was recorded as the copyist of a manzāzu commentary dated to 704 BC, from Nineveh. Nabû-ušallim, son of Nabû-pašer, was a bārû whose name appears on the colophon of one mukallimtu, and an individual by this name is known from amongst the authors of divinatory queries, or tamītu, during the Neo-Assyrian period.

By the late Hellenic period, the text of the series had become more ossified as astrology superseded extispicy as the preferred method of divination. Exemplars include pān tākalti tablet 6, copied by Anu-aha-u šabši in 180 BC, Uruk, and pān tākalti tablet 15 copied by Itti-Marduk-balāṭu, son of Ša-našī-šu, from late Babylonian Sippar.

== Gallery ==
Source: British Museum.
