= Šurpu =

Ancient Mesopotamian incantation series

The ancient Mesopotamian incantation series Šurpu begins enūma nēpešē ša šur-pu t[epp]ušu, “when you perform the rituals for (the series) ‘Burning,’” and was probably compiled in the middle Babylonian period, ca. 1350–1050 BC, from individual incantations of much greater antiquity. It consisted of a long confessional of sins, ritual offences, unwitting breaches of taboos, offences against the moral or social order when the patient was unsure what act of omission he may have committed to offend the gods. Composed in Akkadian, its adjurations extend to nine clay tablets and, at Nineveh, Assurbanipal's scribes had canonized the series, fixing the sequence and providing a codicil at the bottom of each tablet providing the first line of the following tablet. Elsewhere, such as at Assur, the tablet order could vary. The three extant versions of the series vary in included passages, passage order, and tablet numbers. It has been suggested that the current canonical combined version omits one tablet.

== The text ==
In contrast to the Maqlû incantation series, which was intended to counteract kišpū, black magic, it is a ritual against a māmītu, or curse, and entailed the burning of dough which had been applied to and wiped (kuppuru) over the patient, transferring sins to an object that is burnt, providing relief from, for example, the consequences of adultery, murder, theft, perjury, witchcraft, arrogance against the gods, humans or contamination by accursed people or the objects they had infected. The patient would throw various items such as garlic or onion peel, or red wool, symbolically representing his transgressions, into the fire while an incantation was recited:

My illness, my weariness, my guilt, my crime, my sin, my transgression,

The illness that is present in my body, my flesh (and) my veins,
Be peeled off like this garlic so that
The fire-god, the burner, consumes (it) today!

May the curse leave so that I may see the light!

— from Šurpu V–VI

Apart from these references, Erica Reiner observed that “contrary to what we may expect from its title, burning plays a very small role in the series. With the exception of tablet V-VI, none of the prayers or incantations have anything to do with the magical operation the title suggests” and by tablet VII impure material is disposed of in the wilderness, where desert deities are active. The second tablet provided purification from sins of the mouth such as eating taboo things, evil speech, contempt, lying and so on, and also a long list of offenses for the patient to confess. The reverse continues with an invocation of a list of more than forty gods on behalf of the afflicted. Tablets III and IV are addressed to the patron god of magic, Marduk, and the bulk of the remainder include invocations of lists of gods.

The ninth tablet sanctified the various instruments and paraphernalia of the ritual using what is referred to as Kultmittelbeschwörungen, incantations conveying purification. “Incantation: Your hands are washed…you are holy; your hands are washed, you are pure.” (IX 88–95)
