= Counsels of a Pessimist =

The Counsels of a Pessimist is a fragment of Akkadian wisdom literature from the library of the seventh century BC King Assurbanipal.

== Contents ==
The text begins with several affirmations on the futility of human existence. Then it includes advice on piety, diligence, and taking care of one’s livestock and family. The final lines explain how to deal with the fear produced by nightmares. The overarching theme seems to be the necessity of overcoming depression and dealing with distressing thoughts.
