= Mîs-pî =

Ancient Mesopotamian ritual

Mîs-pî, inscribed KA-LUḪ.Ù.DA and meaning “washing of the mouth,” is an ancient Mesopotamian ritual and incantation series for the cultic induction or vivification of a newly manufactured divine idol. It involved around eleven stages: in the city, countryside and temple, the workshop, a procession to the river, then beside the river bank, a procession to the orchard, in reed huts and tents in the circle of the orchard, to the gate of the temple, the niche of the sanctuary and finally, at the quay of the Apsû, accompanied by invocations to the nine great gods, the nine patron gods of craftsmen, and assorted astrological bodies.

== The ritual ==
The extant corpus of tablets comprising mîs-pî consist of two ritual accounts, one late Babylonian and one earlier Assyrian, together with several Sumerian incantations to be recited at the various stages of the ritual, recovered from a wide distribution of find spots. These date from the eighth to the fifth centuries BC and are thought to have been arranged on 6 or 8 tablets. Although these texts are from the first millennium BC, a reference to a ritual of the opening of the mouth of a statue of the deified statue of Gudea may represent an earlier recension, and mouth-washing is mentioned during the middle Babylonian period.

The rituals are for the consecration of a cultic image, a statue formed from a wooden core encased in gold and/or silver, decorated with inlaid precious stones, and dressed in robes. They involve the “washing of the mouth” (mîs-pî proper) on the first day to cleanse the statue of all traces of human contamination in the production of the idol, and the “opening of the mouth” (inscribed KA.DUḪ.Ù.DA, Akkadian: pit pî) performed with syrup, ghee, cedar and cypress on the second to bring it to life, sacraments which may be related to the pit uzni, “ear-opening” ceremony. “On this day be present: for this statue which stands before you ceremoniously grant him the destiny that his mouth may eat, that his ears might hear.” The rituals facilitated the idol taking on the persona of the deity, awakening the supernatural force within it, and enabling it to see, act, eat and drink the offerings and smell the incense: ṣalmu annû ina la pīt pî qutrinna ul iṣṣin akala ul ikkal mê ul išatti, “this statue cannot smell incense without the “Opening of the Mouth” ceremony, it cannot eat food nor drink water.”

Four exemplars from Hellenic Uruk do not include the pit pî stage, but instead introduce a burnt offering of a brushwood fire, lamentations recited by a kalû-priest and the presence of the monarch. Its application seems to have spread to encompass other objects, such as a ceremonial torch, the hide of a bull which is to cover a lilissu- or kettledrum, the apotropaic figurines used in the Šēp lemutti ritual, the divinatory bag of the barû-priest, the mouth of the river to abate its torrent, and even the jewels adorning a king's chariot. It seems that the process of mouth-washing was intended to prepare a person or thing for contact with the divine.

== See also ==
- Prana pratishtha - rite by which a devotional image of a deity is consecrated in a Hindu or Jain temple
- Opening of the mouth ceremony (Ancient Egypt)
- A re-edited Akkadian Sumerian ritual tablet and incantations is now available at https://sites.google.com/a/siena.edu/mis-pi/
