= Ludlul bēl nēmeqi =

Ancient Mesopotamian wisdom poem of c. 1300 BC

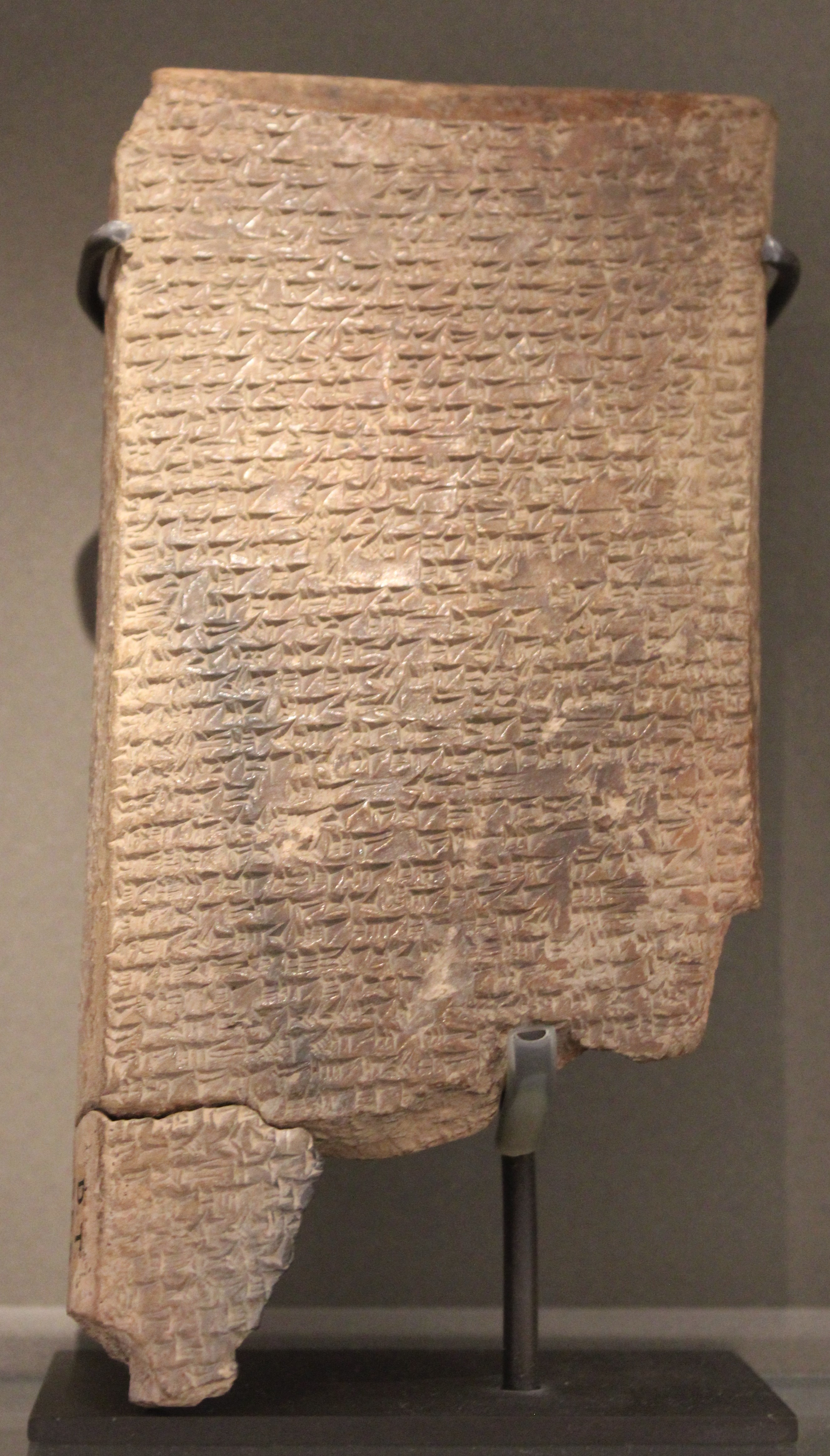
Copy of Ludlul bēl nēmeqi, from Nineveh, 7th Century BC. Louvre Museum (deposit from British Museum).

Ludlul bēl nēmeqi ("I Will Praise the Lord of Wisdom"), known as The Poem of the Righteous Sufferer, is an Ancient Mesopotamian poem (Note: ANET, pp. 434–437) composed in Akkadian in c. 1307–1282 BC. An example of wisdom literature, it considers the unjust suffering of a just man—the author—who is afflicted, and who begins to question the problem of evil and the nature of the cosmic order. The work may be a hymn of thanksgiving to the god Marduk for recovery from illness.

Its composition is dated to the reign of Kassite king of Babylon Nazi-Maruttaš (c. 1307–1282 BC), who is mentioned on line 105 of tablet IV.

The poem was written on four tablets in its canonical form and consisted of 480 lines. Alternate names for the poem include the "Poem of the Righteous Sufferer" or the "Babylonian Book of Job".

== Publication history ==
The first (but now outdated) edition of the poem was published by W. G. Lambert in 1960 (reprinted in 1996). Amar Annus and Alan Lenzi have edited in 2010 a new edition of the poem for the Neo-Assyrian Text Corpus Project. This volume was published as State Archive of Assyria Cuneiform Text 7 (SAACT 7). The new edition includes tablets published by Wiseman, George and Al-Rawi, Horowitz and Lambert, and several other unpublished tablets from the British Museum.

== Šubši-mašrâ-Šakkan ==
Šubši-mašrâ-Šakkan (sometimes given as Šubši-mešrê-šakkan), inscribed ^{m}šub-ši-maš-ra-a-^{d}GÌR, was the narrator of Ludlul bēl nēmeqi. According to the text, he occupied high office, had slaves and fields, a family and spoke of the city as if it were subject to his rule. An official of the same name appears in two other documents dated to his reign.

== Sources ==
A tablet recovered in Nippur lists grain rations given to the messenger of a certain Šubši-mašrâ-Šakkan during Nazi-Marrutaš' fourth year (1304 BC). There is a court order found in Ur, dated to the sixteenth year of Nazi-Maruttaš (1292 BC), in which Šubši-mašrâ-šakkan is given the title šakin māti, ^{lú}GAR KUR, "governor of the country." It is an injunction forbidding harvesting reeds from a certain river or canal.

The poetic work, Ludlul bēl nēmeqi, describes how the fortunes of Šubši-mašrâ-Šakkan, a rich man of high rank, turned one day. When beset by ominous signs, he incurred the wrath of the king, and seven courtiers plotted every kind of mischief against him. This resulted in him losing his property, "they have divided all my possessions among foreign riffraff," friends, "my city frowns on me as an enemy; indeed my land is savage and hostile," physical strength, "my flesh is flaccid, and my blood has ebbed away," and health, as he relates that he "wallowed in my excrement like a sheep." While slipping into and out of consciousness on his death bed, his family already conducting his funeral, Urnindinlugga, a kalû, or incantation priest, was sent by Marduk to presage his salvation. The work concludes with a prayer to Marduk. The text is written in the first person, leading some to speculate that the author was Šubši-mašrâ-Šakkan himself. Perhaps the only certainty is that the subject of the work, Šubši-mašrâ-Šakkan, was a significant historical person during the reign of Nazi-Maruttaš when the work was set. Of the fifty-eight extant fragmentary copies of Ludlul bēl nēmeqi the great majority date to the neo-Assyrian and neo-Babylonian periods.

== See also ==
- Babylonian Theodicy
- Book of Job
- Problem of evil
