= Šēp lemutti =

The work šēp lemutti ina bīt amēli parāsu (inscribed GÌR ḪUL-tim AŠ É LÚ TAR-si), “to block the entry of the enemy (‘foot of evil’) into someone’s house,” also referred to as ana nasāḫ šēp lemutti, "to expel the 'foot of evil'," is a first millennium BC Mesopotamian ritual text idiom well attested in the apodoses of divinations which provides the procedures to protect a house with magical defenses from demonic attack. Sickness, death, misfortune, and ominous occurrences in the house, were perceived to be the result of actions of the hordes of demons from the netherworld. These involve the use of apotropaic figurines, whose god, apkallu, and monster alter-egos, are invoked by an incantation, and their interment in various parts of a private house. Archaeological excavation has uncovered many instances of small figurines buried in boxes in the foundations of structures such as palaces and domestic houses of the Neo-Assyrian and Neo-Babylonian periods.

== The text ==
The purpose of the ritual is defined at the beginning as to evert evil from a house. It then prescribes the fashioning of the various wooden models of the seven apkallus, from seven Babylonian cities, with the faces and wings of birds, or their cloaks from the skin of a fish, their conjuration and distribution in five groups of seven around the building: at the head of the bed, the foundations of the house, the threshold of the chapel, the front of the door, behind the chair or throne, and the middle of the house in front of the chair or throne. Their arrival at the first of the locations is addressed with an invocation followed by šiptu attunu ṣalmānu apkallu maṣṣari, “incantation: you are the statues of the apkallus, the watchers,” which was to recur at each of the subsequent locations. Other figurines were fashioned from clay:

Incantation: Clay pit, clay pit, you are the clay pit of Anu and Enlil,

the clay pit of Ea, lord of the deep, the clay pit of the great gods;
you have made the lord for lordship, you have made the king for kingship,
you have made the prince for future days;
your pieces of silver are given to you, you have received them;
your gift you have received, and so, in the morning before Šamaš, I pinch off
the clay NN son of NN; may it be profitable, may what I do prosper.
. . . .
[As soon as] you have recited this, you shall speak before Šamaš as follows:
[statues] of Ea and Marduk, repelling the evil ones,
[to] be placed in the house of NN son of NN [to] expel the foot of evil,

I [pinch off] their clay before you <in> the clay pit.

— šēp lemutti, lines 151–61

Those of the Sebitti were formed with a qulmû, an ax, in their right hand and a dagger in their left. Other models that were fashioned included dogs, ugallus, various gods (e.g. Meslamtae’a) and monsters, all invoked with the purpose to further the cause that "the evil one and the enemy will be put to flight." The text is known from four copies and also from excerpts included in other ritual texts, such as that known as KAR 298, a derivative work of a similar purpose.
