= Poor Man of Nippur =

Akkadian story

The Poor Man of Nippur is an Akkadian story dating from around 1500 BC. It is attested by only three texts, only one of which is more than a small fragment.

There was a man, a citizen of Nippur, destitute and poor,
Gimil-Ninurta was his name, an unhappy man,
In his city, Nippur, he lived, working hard, but
Had not the silver befitting his class,
Had not the gold befitting people (of his stature).
His storage bins lacked pure grain,
His insides burned, craving food, and
His face was unhappy, craving meat and first-class beer;
Having no food, he lay hungry every day, and
Was dressed in garments that had no change.
In his unhappy mood, he thought to himself:
I'll strip off my garments which have no change, and
In my city of Nippur's market I'll buy a sheep!
So he stripped off his garments which had no change, and
In his city of Nippur's market he bought a three-year-old goat.
In his unhappy mood, he thought to himself:
Suppose I slaughter this goat in my yard-
There could be no feast, for where is the beer?
My friends in the neighbourhood would find out and be furious,
And my family and relatives would be angry with me.

Instead he presents the goat to the mayor. This is interpreted as an insulting bribe and Gimil-Ninurta is given only a mug of third-class beer and the leavings of the meal before being thrown out. Through the medium of the gatekeeper Gimil-Ninurta vows to avenge his mistreatment three times over but when the mayor hears this he laughs all day.

Gimil-Ninurta hires a chariot and robe from the king on credit. Returning to the mayor's house with a locked chest containing two birds he presents himself as a royal courier conveying gold to the temple of Enlil. Arising in the night and opening the chest to release the birds, he beats the mayor for the purported theft and is compensated with two minas of red gold, twice the sum owed to the king.

Gimil-Ninurta calls upon the mayor again disguised as an itinerant physician come to treat his wounds. Claiming that his medication is only effective in the darkness, he lures the mayor into a private room, binds the mayor's hands and feet to stakes and beats him once more.

The mayor instructs his staff to watch for his persecutor but Gimil-Ninurta hires an accomplice to identify himself as 'the man with the goat' at the mayor's gate and draw them out. He hides under a bridge near the mayor's house and beats the mayor nigh to death while he is alone.
