= Maqlû =

Akkadian incantation text

The Maqlû, “burning,” series is an Akkadian incantation text which concerns the performance of a rather lengthy anti-witchcraft, or kišpū, ritual. In its mature form, probably composed in the early first millennium BC, it comprises eight tablets of nearly a hundred incantations and a ritual tablet, giving incipits and directions for the ceremony. This was performed over the course of a single night in the month of Abu (July/August) when the perambulations of the spirits to and from the netherworld made them especially vulnerable to its spells. It was the subject of a letter from the exorcist Nabû-nādin-šumi and the Assyrian king Esarhaddon. It seems to have evolved from an earlier short-form with only ten incantations to be performed in a morning ceremony, whose first incantation begins: Šamaš annûtu șalmū ēpišiya (“O Shamash, these are the figurines of my sorcerer”).

== The ritual ==
The manifestation of witchcraft could take many forms, such as “the grip of the mountain, be it the epilepsy, the offspring of Šulpaea.” The incantations are divided into three sequences. During the first of these rites, figurines of the sorcerer were burned, drowned in black liquid, and finally placed face down on the ground and crushed while the first four tablets were recited.

Pure oven, great daughter of Anu, inside whom the fire of the grave is flaring, inside whom the valiant fire-god has taken up residence, [whose] flames have reached the sky [...], burn, set alight, incinerate my witch! May my warlock's and witch's life swiftly, quickly come to an end!

— Maqlû, Tablet II, 219–224

During the second sequence, the destructive rites against the source of the evil were gradually replaced by the purification and protection of the victim. These rites involved the fumigation of the household and the massaging of the patient while tablets five to seven, line 57, were read out, “May their spells be … peeled away like garlic!” The third and final sequence took place during the early hours of the morning when the remaining incantations were recited while washing the patient. An invocation of the god Nusku, the “protective night light,” was recited at dawn then a greeting to the savior, the sun-god and finally a moment of self recognition in a bowl of pure water: "You are my reflection ... You are mine, and I am yours. May nobody know you, may no evil approach you!" (Maqlû, VIII 127–137)

=== Principal publications ===
- Knut L. Tallqvist (1895). Die assyrische Beschwörungsserie Maqlû nach den Originalen im British Museum. Leipzig: E. Pfeiffer.
- Gerhard Meier (1937). "Die assyrische Beschwörungssammlung Maqlu". Archiv für Orientforschung; Beiheft 2. Berlin.
- Tzvi Abusch (2015). The Witchcraft Series Maqlû. Writings from the Ancient World 37. SBL Press. ISBN 9781628370829.
