= Šumma ālu =

Cuneiform lists of omens

Šumma ālu ina mēlê šakin is the title for a series of a collected number of cuneiform texts of ancient Mesopotamia amounting to one hundred and twenty clay tablets.

The title translates as If a City is Situated on a Height, and it lists over ten thousand omens.

Many of the omens listed in this group begin with the words "Šumma ina āli ma'du (kind of people)," as in, "if there are too many kinds of people," and the omens in this group then proceed with a description of misfortune or negative occurrence.

Similarities are recognised within the nature of the series and in other types of works that are concerned with hemerology and menology.

== Homosexuality omens ==
The text contains some omens related to homosexuality. Out of the 38 omens, five of them are related to homosexuality and two of them are positive omens. One of the positive omens states, "If a man copulates with his equal from the rear, he becomes the leader among his peers and brothers".
