= Esagil-kin-apli =

Chief scholar of Adad-apla-iddina

Esagil-kin-apli, was the ummânū, or chief scholar, of Babylonian king Adad-apla-iddina, 1067–1046 BCE, as he appears on the Uruk List of Sages and Scholars (165 BCE) (Note: W 20030,7 the Seleucid List of Sages and Scholars, obverse line 16, recovered from Anu’s Bīt Rēš temple during the 1959/60 excavation.) listed beside him and is best known for his Diagnostic Handbook, Sakikkū (SA.GIG), a medical treatise which uses symptoms to ascertain etiology, frequently supernatural, and prognosis, which became the received text during the first millennium.

He was a “prominent citizen of Borsippa” from a learned family as he was referred to as the “son” of Assalluḫi-mansum, the apkallu, or sage, of Hammurabi’s time, c. 1792–1750 BCE.

== Works ==
=== The Exorcists Manual ===
The Exorcists Manual, also known as KAR 44, (Note: KAR 44 at CDLI (ref. P369026) rev 5-20.) is sometimes described as a vademecum or handbook and is a compendium of the works all those aspiring to master the āšipūtu or craft of exorcism, should be cognizant. These include exorcism rituals, royal rituals, medical knowledge, incantations and omen series. It begins, "Incipits of the Series belonging to the art of exorcism (mašmaššūtu), established (kunnu) for instruction (izhu) and testing (tāmartu), all to be read out." It is actually composed of two manuals, the first concerning kakugallūtu, “exorcism corpus,” and išippūtu, “esoteric knowledge,” and the second of which begins on the reverse line 4 stating that what follows on lines 5 to 20 is the manual of the exorcist according to the scholar Esagil-kin-apli and then goes on to list works such as the great omen series of astrological (Enūma Anu Enlil) and terrestrial (Šumma Ālu) portents.

=== The Esagil-kīn-apli catalogue ===
Subtitled the niṣirti E[zida], “secret of Ezida,” this is extant in a Neo-Assyrian and a Neo-Babylonian copy. (Note: From Nimrud, ND 4358 + 4366, and from Babylon, BM 41237 + 46607 + 47163.) It provides a biographical introduction and then Esagil-kīn-apli provides an explanation for the new edition of the diagnostic compendium SA.GIG (Sakikkû) and the physiognomic series Alamdimmû, which he describes “(Regarding) the twin series, their arrangement is one.” Although the Catalogue of Texts and Authors credits the authorship of the two works to the god Ea, it is this catalogue together with the codicil on the Sakikkû which suggest otherwise. The catalogue opens with an index of sorts, providing incipits for each of the tablets together with the number of their lines.

=== Alamdimmû ===
Šumma alamdimmû, “if the form,” contains physiognomic omens on twenty-seven tablets. In his catalogue, Esagil-kin-apli describes the work as: “... (concerning) external form and appearance (and how they imply) the fate of the man that Ea and Assaluḫi/Marduk (?) ordained in heaven.” The term alamdimmû, “form” or “figure,” comes from the Sumerian alam.dímu. Following the first twelve tablets of the Šumma alamdimmû proper, the work is subdivided into sections beginning with Šumma nigdimdimmû, “if the appearance” or “shape,” on two tablets, whose extant copies are too fragmentary to interpret.

The section named Šumma kataduggû, “if the utterance,” on one tablet describes the consequences of utterances and habitual conduct and shares characteristics with omens from the Šumma ālu, “if a city,” terrestrial omen series. The section beginning Šumma sinništu qaqqada rabât, “if a woman’s head is large,” on two tablets provides omens based on the appearance of a woman. The Šumma liptu section, “if a spot” or “mole,” was probably complete on nine tablets, eight devoted to the location of blemishes on males and one on females. The final tablet, Šumma šer’ān pūt imittišu ittenebbi, “if the vein on the right side of his forehead throbs,” concerns itself with involuntary movements.

=== The Sakikkū (SA.GIG) ===
In the colophons of the two extant catalogues of diagnostic and physiognomic omens, the origin of the Sakikkū, “symptoms,” (Sumerian: SA.GIG: “diseased veins/muscles”) is given. Esagil-kīn-apli relates that he assembled the diagnostic omens to produce the received text for the first millennium during the reign of Adad-apla-iddina. He says of these omens, “that since long ago had not been organized into a new edition but was tangled like threads and had no master edition.” (Note: ša ul-tu ul-la zarâ(sur.[gibil]) [la] ṣab.tu_{4} ù kīma(gim) qê.gu^{meš} parkū/egrū.(gib)[^{meš}-ma gabarâ(gaba.ri)] là īšû(tuku).) The primary purpose of the diagnosis was to identify the divine sender of the disease, as this was perceived to be a message from a deity. He applies a logical set of axioms and assumptions, including the need to inspect the symptoms of a patient in order to come up with a diagnosis, and arranges the more than 3,000 entries systematically from head to foot, left (inauspicious) to right (auspicious), and in the color sequence red/brown, yellow/green, black or white, and two shades of uncertain hue on 40 tablets as this is the number of the god Ea who gave man diagnostic knowledge.

It is divided into six chapters of unequal length and starts with a two-tablet section beginning “when the exorcist goes to the house of a sick person,” (Note: enūma anta bīt marsi āšipu illku…) which provides the omens that one might encounter on the way such as a multi-colored pig (patient has dropsy). The second chapter, “when you approach the sick man,” is arranged a capite ad calcem, “inspection from the head to the feet,” and was attributed to the authorship of the deity Ea. It was complete in twelve tablets, the first seven of which are devoted to the head. The third chapter on infectious diseases, “if he is sick for one day and…” includes the course of the disease.

The fourth chapter exclusively deals with neurological syndromes including epilepsy, seizures, strokes, ghosts and gods and contains the few magical prescriptions contained within the work. The catalogue names the five tablets (Note: Tablets XXVI (BM 47753 from Babylon), XXVII (SU51/92+ from Sultantepe), XXVIII, XXIX and XXX although the latter is not extant.) of this chapter, “if miqtu (a “fall”) falls upon him and…,” “if a man’s face has been struck by palsy,” “if the hand of a spirit turns him into an an.ta.šub.ba (sudden seizure “fallen from heaven”),” “if Lugal.ùr.ra is born with him,” and “if he is ill and opens his mouth all the time.” The fifth chapter, consisting of five tablets, possibly treats with specific diseases such as those evidenced by skin lesions and fever. The 33rd tablet is dedicated to giving the name to a disease based upon its nature. The sixth and final chapter, also consisting of five tablets on the woman and infants, “if a fertile woman is pregnant,” concerns gynecology, in which the gender and fortune of the unborn child are diagnosed by the symptoms encountered during the course of the pregnancy, such as the change in shape and color of the nipples.
