= List of inscriptions in biblical archaeology =

The following is a list of inscribed artifacts, items made or given shape by humans, that are significant to biblical archaeology.

== Selected artifacts significant to biblical chronology ==
This table lists inscriptions which are of particular significance to the study of biblical chronology. References are from ANET and COS and link to editio princeps (EP), if known.

=== Egyptian ===
Name	Image	Current location	Discovered	Date	Writing	Significance	Refs
Autobiography of Weni		Cairo Museum	1880, Abydos	c.2280 BC	Egyptian hieroglyphs	Records the earliest known Egyptian military campaigns in Sinai and the Levant.	ANET 227–228
Sebek-khu Stele		Manchester Museum	1901, Abydos	c.1860 BC	Egyptian hieroglyphs	Records the earliest known Egyptian military campaign in Retjenu, including Sekmem (s-k-m-m, thought to be Shechem).	ANET 230
Merneptah Stele		Cairo Museum	1896, Thebes	c. 1209 BC	Egyptian hieroglyphs	The text is largely an account of a military campaign against the ancient Libyans, but the last three of the 28 lines deal with a separate campaign in Canaan, including the first documented instance of the name Israel in the historical record, and the only documented record in Ancient Egypt.	COS 2.6 / ANET 376–378 / EP
Bubastite Portal		Original location	1828, Karnak	c. 925 BC	Egyptian hieroglyphs	Records the conquests and military campaigns in c.925 BC of Shoshenq I, of the Twenty-second Dynasty, identified with the biblical Shishaq. Towns identified include Rafah (rph), Megiddo (mkdi) and Ajalon (iywrn)	ANET 242–243

==== Other significant Egyptian artifacts ====
- Execration texts – earliest references to many Biblical locations
- Papyrus Brooklyn 35.1446 – A document that lists the names of 45 individuals, including a Canaanite woman named "Šp-ra." Scholars assume that this is a hieroglyphic transliteration of the Hebrew name "Shiphrah," which also appears in Exodus 1:15–21. However, while the name may be related, the document dates to c. 1833–1743 BCE (centuries before the biblical Shiphra would have lived).
- Ipuwer Papyrus – poem describing Egypt as afflicted by natural disasters and in a state of chaos. The document is dated to around 1250 BC but the content is thought to be earlier, dated back to the Middle Kingdom, though no earlier than the late Twelfth Dynasty. Once thought to describe the biblical Exodus, it is now considered the world's earliest known treatise on political ethics, suggesting that a good king is one who controls unjust officials, thus carrying out the will of the gods.
- Berlin pedestal relief – considered by many modern scholars to contain the earliest historic reference to ancient Israel. Experts remain divided on this hypothesis.

=== Cuneiform ===
Name	Image	Current location	Discovered	Date	Writing	Significance	Refs
Statue of Idrimi		British Museum	1939, Alalakh	c.1500 BC	Akkadian cuneiform	Records the earliest certain cuneiform reference to Canaan	ANET 557
Kurkh Monoliths		British Museum	1861, Üçtepe, Bismil	c.850 BC	Assyrian cuneiform	The Shalmaneser III monolith contains a description of the Battle of Qarqar at the end. This description contains the name "A-ha-ab-bu Sir-ila-a-a" which is generally accepted to be a reference to Ahab king of Israel, although it is the only known reference to the term "Israel" in Assyrian and Babylonian records, a fact brought up by some scholars who dispute the proposed translation.	COS 2.113A / ANET 277–278
Black Obelisk of Shalmaneser III		British Museum	1846, Nimrud	c.825 BC	Assyrian cuneiform	Contains what is thought to be the earliest known picture of a biblical figure: possibly Jehu son Omri (^{m}Ia-ú-a mar ^{m}Hu-um-ri-i), or Jehu's ambassador, kneeling at the feet of Shalmaneser III.	COS 2.113F / ANET 278–281
Saba'a Stele		Istanbul Archaeology Museums	1905, Saba'a	c.800 BC	Assyrian cuneiform	Records Adad-nirari III's Assyrian campaign to Pa-la-áš-tu (Philistia)	COS 2.114E / ANET 282 / EP
Nimrud Slab		Unknown	1854, Nimrud	c.800 BC	Akkadian cuneiform	Describes Adad-nirari III's early Assyrian conquests in Palastu (Phillistia), Tyre, Sidon, Edom and Humri (the latter understood as the Kingdom of Israel).	COS 2.114G
Nimrud Tablet K.3751		British Museum	c.1850, Nimrud	c.733 BC	Akkadian cuneiform	Describes Tiglath-Pileser III's (745 to 727 BC) campaigns to the region, including the first known archeological reference to Judah (Yaudaya or KUR.ia-ú-da-a-a).	COS 2.117 / ANET 282–284
Sargon II's Prism A		British Museum	c.1850, Library of Ashurbanipal	c.710 BC	Akkadian cuneiform	Describes Sargon II's (722 to 705 BC) campaigns to Palastu, Judah, Edom and Moab.	COS 2.118i / ANET 287
Lachish relief		British Museum	1845, Nineveh	c.700 BC	Assyrian cuneiform	Portion of the Sennacherib relief, which depicts captives from Judah being led into captivity after the Siege of Lachish in 701 BC.	COS 2.119C / EP
Azekah Inscription		British Museum	c.1850, Library of Ashurbanipal	c.700 BC	Akkadian cuneiform	Describes an Assyrian campaign by Sennacherib against Hezekiah, King of Judah, including the conquest of Azekah.	COS 2.119D
Sennacherib's Annals		British Museum, Oriental Institute of Chicago, and the Israel Museum	1830, likely Nineveh, unprovenanced	c.690 BC	Assyrian cuneiform	Describes the Assyrian king Sennacherib's siege of Jerusalem in 701 BC during the reign of king Hezekiah.	COS 2.119B / ANET 287–288
Esarhaddon's Treaty with Ba'al of Tyre		British Museum	c.1850, Library of Ashurbanipal	c.675 BC	Akkadian cuneiform	Describes a treaty between Esarhaddon (reigned 681 to 669 BC) and Ba'al of Tyre with respect to pi-lis-te	COS 2.120 / ANET 533
Cylinders of Nabonidus		British Museum and Pergamon Museum	1854, Ur	c.550 BC	Akkadian cuneiform	Describes Belshazzar (Balthazar) as Nabonidus' eldest son	COS 2.123A
Nebuchadnezzar Chronicle		British Museum	1896 (acquired), unprovenanced	c.550 – 400 BC	Akkadian cuneiform	Describes Nebuchadnezzar's first siege of Jerusalem in 597 BC, the Siege of Jerusalem (597 BC)	COS 1.137 / ANET 301–307
Cylinder of Cyrus		British Museum	1879, Babylon	c.530 BC	Akkadian cuneiform	King Cyrus's treatment of religion, which is significant to the books of Chronicles, Ezra and Nehemiah.	COS 2.124 / ANET 315–316
Nabonidus Chronicle		British Museum	1879 (acquired), Sippar, unprovenanced	4th –1st century BC	Akkadian cuneiform	Describes the conquest of Babylon by the Persian king Cyrus the Great	COS 1.137 / ANET 301–307 / EP

==== Other significant cuneiform artifacts ====
- Creation myths and flood myths – recorded on the Epic of Gilgamesh, the Atra-Hasis tablets, the Enûma Eliš, the Eridu Genesis and the Barton Cylinder
- Law tablets – ancient Near East legal tablets: Code of Hammurabi, Laws of Eshnunna, the Code of Ur-Nammu, king of Ur (c. 2050 BC), the Laws of Eshnunna (c. 1930 BC) and the Code of Lipit-Ishtar of Isin (c. 1870 BC). Later codes than Hammurabi's include the Code of the Nesilim. Hittite laws, the Assyrian laws, and Mosaic Law / Ten Commandments. (see cuneiform law).
- Tell al-Rimah stela (c. 780 BC) – tells of the exploits of Adad-nirari III, mentioning "Joash King of Samaria"
- Annals of Tiglath-Pileser III (740–730 BC):
  - Layard 45b+ III R 9,1 possibly refers to [KUR sa-me-ri-i-na-a-a] as ["land of Samaria"]
  - The Iran Stela refers to KUR sa-m[e]-ri-i-na-a-[a] "land of Samaria"
  - Layard 50a + 50b + 67a refers to URU sa-me-ri-na-a-a "city of Samaria"
  - Layard 66 refers to URU Sa-me-ri-na "city of Samaria"
  - III R 9.3 50, refers to "Menahem the Samarian"
  - Nimrud Tablet III R 10.2 28–29, refers to the overthrown of Pekah by Hoshea.
  - one fragment refers to "Azriau" and another it has been joined to refers to "Yaudi". Some scholars have interpreted this as Ahaziah / Uzziah, although this is disputed and has not gained scholarly consensus.
  - III R 10,2 refers to KUR E Hu-um-ri-a "land of Bit-Humri"
  - ND 4301 + 4305 refers to KUR E Hu-um-ri-a "land of Bit-Humri"
- Babylonian Chronicle ABC1 (725 BC) – Shalmaneser V refers to URU Sa-ma/ba-ra-'-in "city of Samar(i)a"
- Annals of Sargon II (720 BC):
  - Nimrud Prism, Great Summary Inscription refers to URU Sa-me-ri-na "city of Samerina"
  - Palace Door, Small Summary Inscription, Cylinder Inscription, Bull Inscription refers to KUR Bit-Hu-um-ri-a "land of Bit-Humri"
- Victory stele of Esarhaddon – a dolerite stele commemorating the return of Esarhaddon after his army's second battle and victory over Pharaoh Taharqa in northern ancient Egypt in 671 BC, discovered in 1888 in Zincirli Höyük (Sam'al, or Yadiya) by Felix von Luschan and Robert Koldewey. It is now in the Pergamon Museum in Berlin.
- Esarhaddon's Succession Treaty (written around 675 BCE) – Some scholars think that this treaty served as a literary model for the curses in Deuteronomy 28:15–64, as well as content in Deuteronomy 13, due to strong textual similarities.
- Nebo-Sarsekim Tablet (circa 595 BC) – a clay cuneiform inscription referring to an official at the court of Nebuchadrezzar II, king of Babylon, possibly the same official named in the Biblical Jeremiah.
- Jehoiachin's Rations Tablets (6th century BC) – Describe the rations set aside for a royal captive identified with Jehoiachin, king of Judah (Cf. 2 Kings 24:12,15–16; 25:27–30; 2 Chronicles 36:9–10; Jeremiah 22:24–26; 29:2; 52:31–34; Ezekiel 17:12).

=== Canaanite, Aramaic and Hebrew ===
Name	Image	Current location	Discovered	Date	Writing	Significance	Refs
Mesha Stele		Louvre	1868, Dhiban, Jordan	c.850 BC	Moabite language	Describes the victories of Moabite king Mesha over the House of Omri (kingdom of Israel). It bears the earliest certain extra-biblical reference to the Israelite god Yahweh, and—if French scholar André Lemaire's reconstruction of a portion of line 31 is correct—the earliest mention of the "House of David" (i.e., the kingdom of Judah). One of the only two known artifacts containing the "Moabite" dialect of Canaanite languages (the second is the El-Kerak Inscription)	COS 2.23 / ANET 320–321
Tel Dan Stele		Israel Museum	1993, Tel Dan	c.800 BC	Old Aramaic	Significant as an extra-biblical corroboration of Israel's past, particularly in lines 8 and 9, which mention a "king of Israel" and a "house of David". The latter is generally understood by scholars to refer to the ruling dynasty of Judah. Although the meaning of this phrase has been disputed by a small minority of scholars, today it is generally accepted as a reference to the Davidic dynasty.	
Siloam inscription		Istanbul Archaeology Museums	1880, Siloam tunnel	c.701 BC	Paleo-Hebrew	Records the construction of Siloam tunnel	COS 2.28 / ANET 321
LMLK seals		Various	1870 onwards	c.700 BC	Phoenician alphabet (also known as Paleo-Hebrew)	c.2,000 stamp impressions, translated as "belonging to the King"	COS 2.77 / EP
Ekron inscription		Israel Museum	1996, Ekron	c.650 BC	Phoenician alphabet	The first known inscription from the area ascribed to Philistines	COS 2.42
Trumpeting Place inscription		Israel Museum	1968, Jerusalem	c.1st century AD	Hebrew	Believed to be a directional sign for the priests who blew a trumpet, consistent with an account in Josephus	

==== Other significant Canaanite, Aramaic and Hebrew artifacts ====
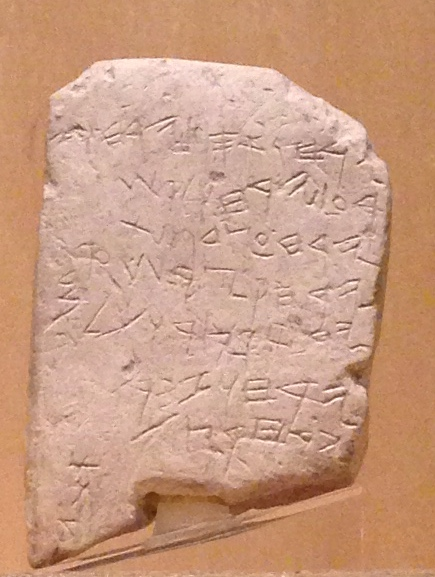
Gezer calendar in the Istanbul Archaeology Museums.

- Early Paleo-Hebrew writing – contenders for the earliest Hebrew inscriptions include the Gezer calendar, Biblical period ostraca at Elah and Izbet Sartah, and the Zayit Stone
- Yeho'ezer ben Hosh'ayahu seal – 2,700 year old seal discovered in 2024 in Jerusalem. Neo-Assyrian-style amulet thought to be from First Temple Period, likely Judahite senior administrator
- Pim weight – evidence of the use of an ancient source for the Book of Samuel due to the use of an archaic term.
- Khirbet Qeiyafa ostracon – 10th century BC inscription – both the language it is written in and the translation are disputed. Was discovered in excavations near Israel's Elah valley.
- Tell es-Safi inscription (10th to mid 9th centuries BC) – Potsherd inscribed with the two names "alwt" and "wlt", etymologically related to the name Goliath and demonstrate that the name fits with the context of late-tenth/early-ninth-century BC Philistine culture. Found at Tell es-Safi, the traditional identification of Gath.
- Ophel pithos is a 3,000-year-old inscribed fragment of a ceramic jar found near Jerusalem's Temple Mount by archeologist Eilat Mazar. It is the earliest alphabetical inscription found in Jerusalem written in what was probably Proto-Canaanite script. Some scholars believe it to be an inscription of the type of wine that was held in a jar.
- Amman Citadel Inscription – 9th century BC inscription in the Ammonite language, one of the few surviving written records of Ammon.
- Melqart stele – (9th–8th century BC) William F. Albright identifies Bar-hadad with Ben-hadad I, who was a contemporary of the biblical Asa and Baasha.
- Ostraca House – (probably about 850 BC, at least prior to 750 BC) 64 legible ostraca found in the treasury of Ahab – written in early Hebrew.
- Deir Alla Inscription (c. 840–760 BC) 9th or 8th century BC inscription about a prophet named Balaam (cf. the Book of Numbers).
- Kuntillet Ajrud inscriptions – (9th–8th century BC) Jar and plaster inscriptions, stone incisions, and art with "Yahweh and his Asherah".
- Sefire steles (8th century BC) – described as "the best extrabiblical source for West Semitic traditions of covenantal blessings and curses".
- Stele of Zakkur (8th century BC) – Mentions Hazael king of Aram.
- Shebna Inscription (8th–7th century BC?) – found over the lintel or doorway of a tomb, has been ascribed to Hezekiah's comptroller Shebna.
- Bullae (c. 715–687 BC or 716–687 BC) (Note: See William F. Albright for the former and for the latter Edwin R. Thiele.. But Gershon Galil dates his reign to 697–642 BC.) (clay roundels impressed with a personal seal identifying the owner of an object, the author of a document, etc.) are, like ostraka, relatively common, both in digs and on the antiquities market. The identification of individuals named in bullae with equivalent names from the Bible is difficult, but identifications have been made with king Hezekiah and his servants (avadim in Hebrew, [עבדים – slaves])
  - Bulla of Gemariah son of Shaphan (r. 609–598 BC) – possible link to a figure during the reign of Jehoiakim (Jeremiah 36:10). Archaeologist Yair Shoham notes: "It should be borne in mind, however, that the names found on the bullae were popular in ancient times and it is equally possible that there is no connection between the names found on the bullae and the person mentioned in the Bible."
  - Seal of Jehucal (7th century BC) – Jehucal or Jucal is mentioned in chapters 37 and 38 of the Book of Jeremiah where King Zedekiah sends Jehucal son of Shelemiah and the priest Zephaniah son of Maaseiah to the prophet Jeremiah saying "Please pray for us to the Lord our God" (Jeremiah 37:3). His seal and also one of Gedaliah, son of Pashhur (also mentioned in Jeremiah 38:1 together with Jehucal) were found within a few yards from each other during excavations in the city of David, Jerusalem, in 2005 and 2008, respectively, by Eilat Mazar.
  - Bullae of Eliakhim – In 2019, archaeologist Yosef Garfinkel claimed to have discovered a reference to Eliakhim, son of Hilkiah, in two bullae unearthed at Tel Lachish. He described the seal legends as reading "Eliakim, (son of) Yehozarah". The stratified bulla, publicized with three others, is sibling to an earlier find from the market.

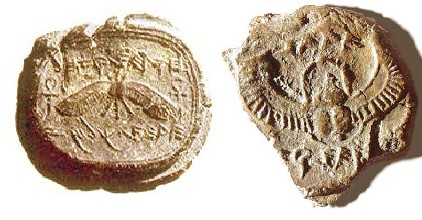
"To Hezekiah, son of Ahaz, king of Judah" – found at the Ophel excavations in Jerusalem

- Seals
  - Seal of Jaazaniah – Features skillfully ground onyx into appearance of eye with black pupil. Cock image proof of chickens in Palestine before Hellenistic times.
  - Seal of Hezekiah – 8th. c BCE
  - King Ahaz's Seal (732 to 716 BC) – Ahaz was a king of Judah but "did not do what was right in the sight of the Lord his God, as his ancestor David had done" (2 Kings 16:2; 2 Chronicles 28:1). He worshiped idols and followed pagan practices. "He even made his son pass through fire, according to the abominable practices of the nations" (2 Kings 16:3). Ahaz was the son and successor of Jotham.
  - Seal of פלטה (Paltah) – one known of at least seven women's names on inscribed Hebrew seals with a pedigree. Provenanced seals constitute 7% of what's on record.
- Khirbet Beit Lei graffiti contains oldest known Hebrew writing of the word "Jerusalem", dated to 7th century BC: "I am YHWH thy Lord. I will accept the cities of Judah and I will redeem Jerusalem. ... Absolve us oh merciful God. Absolve us oh YHWH"
- Yavne-Yam ostracon is an inscribed pottery fragment dated to 7th century BC and written in ancient Hebrew language. It contains early attestation of the word Shabbat.

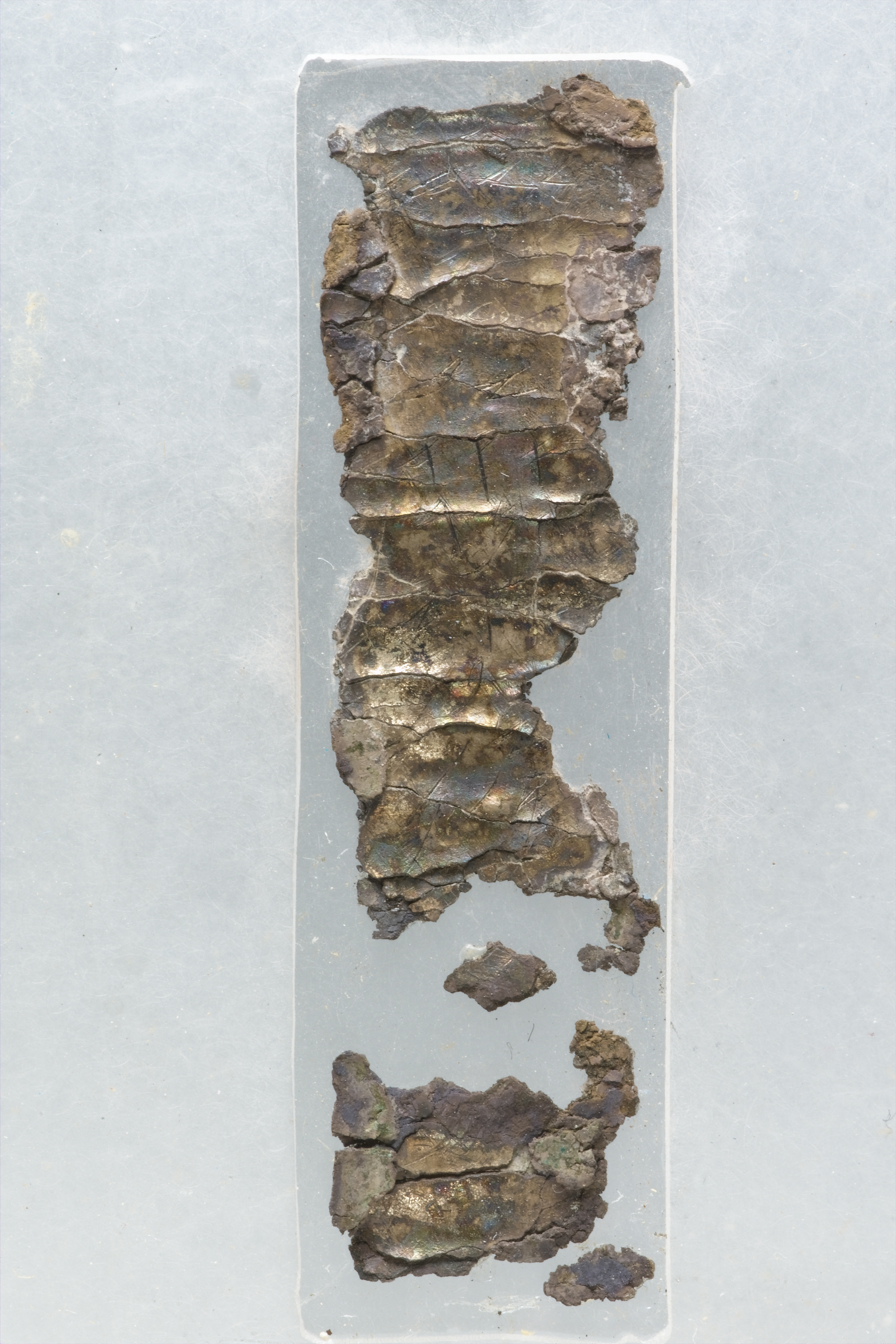
Ketef Hinnom Priestly Blessing

- Ketef Hinnom scrolls – Probably the oldest surviving texts currently known from the Hebrew Bible – priestly blessing dated to 600 BC. Text from the Book of Numbers in the Old Testament. Described as "one of most significant discoveries ever made" for biblical studies.
- Lachish letters – letters written in carbon ink by Hoshaiah (cf. Nehemiah 12:32, Jeremiah 42:1, 43:2), a military officer stationed near Jerusalem, to Joash the commanding officer at Lachish during the last years of Jeremiah during Zedekiah's reign (c.588 BC) (see Jeremiah 34:7). Lachish fell soon after, two years before the fall of Jerusalem.
- Lachish ewer – a pot with sacred trees and more, often mentioned in academic discussion
- Arad ostraca – the "House of Yahweh" ostracon is an ancient pottery fragment discovered at Tel Arad probably referring to the Temple at Jerusalem.
- Elephantine papyri – ancient Jewish papyri dating to the 5th century BC, name three persons mentioned in Nehemiah: Darius II, Sanballat the Horonite and Johanan the high priest.
- Hasmonean coinage (164–35 BC)

=== Greek and Latin ===
Name	Image	Current location	Discovered	Date	Writing	Significance	Refs
Eunēlos inscription		Likely the National Museum of Damascus	Ras Macalister's excavations of Gezer		Greek	Early Greek trigrammaton attestation with syncretic character, refers to Hercules and a feast of Yahweh Inasios.	
Heliodorus stele		Israel Museum	2005–2006, Maresha	178 BC	Greek	It provides background for the "Heliodorus affair" described in 2 Maccabees, in which a Seleucid official named Heliodorus attempts to confiscate the treasury of the Jerusalem Temple. The inscription, for its part, records Heliodorus appointing Olympiodorus as overseer of sanctuaries in the Levant.	
Temple Warning inscription		Istanbul Archaeology Museums	1871, Jerusalem	c.23 BC – 70 AD	Greek	Believed to be an inscription from Herod's Temple, warning foreigners ("allogenē") to refrain from entering the Temple enclosure	
Arch of Titus		Original location	n.a., Rome	c.82 AD	Latin	Relief showing spoils from the Sack of Jerusalem by Titus in 70 AD. Depicted are the menorah and trumpets, as well as what might be the Table of Showbread.	

==== Other significant Greek and Latin artifacts ====
- Pilate Stone (c. 36 AD) – carved inscription attributed to Pontius Pilate, a prefect of the Roman-controlled province of Judaea from 26 to 36 AD.
- Delphi Inscription (c. 52 AD) – The reference to proconsul Gallio in the inscription provides an important marker for developing a chronology of the life of Apostle Paul by relating it to the trial of Paul in Achaea mentioned in the Acts of the Apostles (18:12–17).
- Erastus Inscription (Roman period) – an inscription found in 1929 near a paved area northeast of the theater of Corinth, dated to the mid-first century and reads "Erastus in return for his aedileship paved it at his own expense." Some New Testament scholars have identified this aedile Erastus with the Erastus mentioned in the Epistle to the Romans but this is disputed by others.
- Judaea Capta coinage (after 70 AD) – a series of commemorative coins originally issued by the Roman Emperor Vespasian to celebrate the capture of Judaea and the destruction of the Jewish Second Temple by his son Titus in 70 AD during the First Jewish Revolt.
- Nazareth Inscription bears an edict of Caesar prohibiting grave robbing.

== Controversial (forgery, claimed forgery, or identification disputed) ==
- Uzziah Tablet (8th century BC or 30–70 AD?) – controversial tablet discovered in 1931 by Professor E. L. Sukenik of the Hebrew University of Jerusalem in a Russian convent.
- Jehoash Inscription – controversial black stone tablet in Phoenician regarding King Jehoash's repair work. Suspected to be a forgery.
- Ivory pomegranate – a thumb-sized semitic ornamental artifact bears an inscription: "Holy to the Priest of the House of God [blank, but reconstructed YHWH]", thought to have adorned the High Priest's sceptre within the Holy of Holies. Suspected to be a forged inscription on an older item rather than a newer one, but unresolved.
- James Ossuary – a 1st-century limestone box that was used for containing the bones of the dead, bearing an Aramaic inscription in the Hebrew alphabet, "James, son of Joseph, brother of Jesus", cut into one side of the box. Suspected to be a forgery.
- Caiaphas ossuary – a highly decorated ossuary twice inscribed "Joseph, son of Caiaphas" which held the bones of a 60-year-old male, discovered in a burial cave in south Jerusalem in November 1990.
- Miriam ossuary – a decorated ossuary inscribed "Miriam, daughter of Yeshua, son of Caiaphas", found in a tomb in the Valley of Elah in 2011.
- Titulus Crucis – a piece of wood claimed to be a relic of the True Cross, which Christian tradition holds to be a part of the cross's titulus (inscription), now kept in the church of Santa Croce in Gerusalemme in Rome. Radiocarbon dating tests on the artifact have shown that it dates between 980 and 1146 AD.
- Shapira Scroll, leather strips containing a somewhat different text of the Ten Commandments, belonging to Moses Wilhelm Shapira, a Jerusalem antiquities dealer. Widely discredited following its 1883 release, resulting in Shapira's suicide. Has been reassessed following the 1946 discovery of the Dead Sea Scrolls.
- Seal of Manasseh – Stone seal of Manasseh, King of Judah c.687–642 BC. Reportedly offered to a private collector for one million dollars.
- Seals of Baruch – controversial bullae allegedly belonging to Baruch, son of Neriah. Suspected to be forgeries.
- Seal of Ahaz – Some scholars stipulate that this is in fact a forgery.
- Shema Seal – bulla that mentions the name of Jeroboam II and is written in Paleo Hebrew.

== Significant museums ==
- Israel Museum, Jerusalem
- Bible Lands Museum, Jerusalem
- Hecht Museum
- Institute for the Study of Ancient Cultures, Chicago
- British Museum
- The Louvre

== Concordance of external lists ==
- ANET: Ancient Near Eastern Texts Relating to the Old Testament. Third Edition with Supplement. Ed. James B. Pritchard. Princeton: Princeton Univ. Press, 1969
- COS: The Context of Scripture. 3 volumes. Eds. William W. Hallo and K. Lawson Younger. Leiden: Brill, 1997–2002

Inscription	COS		ANET	
Inscription	Ref.	Title	Ref.	Title
Pyramid Texts	1.4	Pyramid Texts Spell 600	3	The Creation by Atum
	1.9	Papyrus Bremer-Rind	6–7	The Repulsing of the Dragon and the Creation
Shabaka Stone	1.15	The "Memphite Theology"	4–6	The Theology of Memphis
	1.17	Coffin Texts Spell 1130	7–8	All Men Created Equal in Opportunity
Book of the Dead	1.18	Book of the Dead 175	9–10	The Primeval Establishment of Order
Coffin Texts	1.19	Coffin Text 157	10	The Mythological Origin of Certain Unclean Animals
	1.21	The Repulsing of the Dragon	11–12	The Repulsing of the Dragon
	1.22	The Legend of Isis and the Name of Re	12–14	The God and His Unknown Name of Power
Astarte and the Insatiable Sea	1.23	The Legend of Astarte and the Tribute of the Sea	17–18	Astarte and the Tribute of the Sea
Book of the Heavenly Cow	1.24	The Destruction of Mankind	10	Deliverance of Mankind from Destruction
Great Hymn to the Aten	1.25	The Great Cairo Hymn of Praise to Amun-Re	365–367	A Hymn to Amon-Re
Great Hymn to the Aten	1.27	Two Hymns to the Sun-god	367–368	A Universalist Hymn to the Sun
Great Hymn to the Aten	1.28	The Great Hymn to the Aten	369–371	The Hymn to the Aton
Harper's Songs	1.30	The Song from the Tomb of King Intef	467	A Song of the Harper
Harper's Songs	1.31	The Song from the Tomb of Neferhotep	33–34	The Good Fortune of the Dead
Execration texts	1.32	Execration Texts	328–329	The Execration of Asiatic Princes
	1.33	Dream Oracles	495	The Interpretation of Dreams
	1.34	Daily Ritual of the Temple of Amun-Re at Karnak	325–326	The Daily Ritual in the Temple
Teaching for King Merykara	1.35	Merikare	414–418	The Instruction for King Meri-ka-re
Instructions of Amenemhat	1.36	Amenemhet	418–419	The Instruction of King Amen-em-het
Story of Sinuhe	1.38	Sinuhe	18–22	The Story of Si-nuhe
Tale of Two Brothers	1.40	The Two Brothers	23–25	The Story of Two Brothers
Story of Wenamun	1.41	The Report of Wenamun	25–29	The Journey of Wen-Amon to Phoenicia
Ipuwer Papyrus	1.42	The Admonitions of an Egyptian Sage: the Admonitions of Ipuwer	441–444	The Admonitions of Ipu-wer
The Eloquent Peasant	1.43	The Eloquent Peasant	407–410	The Protests of the Eloquent Peasant
Instruction of Any	1.46	Instruction of Any	420–421	The Instruction of Ani
Instruction of Amenemope	1.47	Instruction of Amenemope	421–424	The Instruction of Amen-em-Opet
The Satire of the Trades	1.48	Dua-khety or the Satire on the Trades	432–434	The Satire on the Trades
Famine Stela	1.53	The Famine Stela	31–32	The Tradition of Seven Lean Years in Egypt
Bentresh stela	1.54	The Legend of the Possessed Princess ("Butresh Stela")	29–31	The Legend of the Possessed Princess
Myth of Elkunirša	1.55	Elkunirsa and Asertu	519	El, Ashertu and the Storm-god
Illuyanka	1.56	The Storm-god and the Serpent (Iluyanka)	125–126	The Myth of Iluyankas
Telipinu	1.57	The Wrath of Telipinu	126–128	The Telepinus Myth
Muršili II	1.60	Plague Prayers of Mursili II	394–396	Plague Prayers of Mursilis
	1.63	Uhhamuwa's Ritual Against Plague	347	Ritual Against Pestilence
Hittite military oath	1.66	The First Soldiers' Oath	353–354	The Soldiers' Oath
Šuppiluliuma I	1.74	Deeds of Suppiluliuma	319	Suppiluliumas and the Egyptian Queen
	1.83	Instructions to Priests and Temple Officials	207–210	Instructions for Temple Officials
	1.84	Instructions to Commanders of Border Garrisons	210–211	From the Instructions for the Commander of the Border Guards
Baal Cycle	1.86	The Ba`lu Myth	129–142	Poems about Baal and Anath
Legend of Keret	1.102	The Kirta Epic	142–149	The Legend of King Keret
Tale of Aqhat	1.103	The 'Aqhatu Legend	149–155	The Tale of Aqhat
	1.108	The Descent of Ishtar to the Underworld	106–109	Descent of Ishtar to the Nether World
	1.109	Nergal and Ereshkigal	507–512	Nergal and Ereshkigal
	1.110	Nergal and Ereshkigal (Amarna Version)	103–104	Nergal and Ereshkigal
Enūma Eliš	1.111	Epic of Creation	60–72, 501–503	The Creation Epic
Dynasty of Dunnum	1.112	The Theogony of Dunnu	517–518	A Babylonian Theogony
	1.115	Prayer to Gods of the Night	390–391	Prayer to the Gods of the Night
Great Prayer to Šamaš	1.117	The Shamash Hymn	387–389	Hymn to the Sun-god
	1.129	The Adapa Story	101–103	Adapa
Atra-Hasis	1.130	Atra-Hasis	104–106, 512–514	Atrahasis
	1.131	Etana	114–118, 517	Etana
Epic of Gilgamesh	1.132	Gilgamesh	72–99, 503–507	The Epic of Gilgamesh
	1.133	The Birth Legend of Sargon of Akkad	119	The Legend of Sargon
	1.134	Babylonian King Lists	271, 272, 566–567	The Babylonian King List B, The Babylonian King List A, A Seleucid King List
	1.135	Assyrian King Lists	564–566	The Assyrian King List
Babylonian Chronicles	1.137	Babylonian Chronicle	301–307	The Neo-Babylonian Empire and its Successors
	1.143	An Assurbanipal Hymn for Shamash	386–387	Prayer of Ashurbanipal to the Sun-God
Adad-guppi	1.147	The Adad-Guppi Autobiography	560–562	The Mother of Nabonidus
Ludlul bēl nēmeqi	1.153	The Poem of the Righteous Sufferer	596–600; 434	Ludlul Bēl Nēmeqi
Babylonian Theodicy	1.154	The Babylonian Theodicy	601–604	The Babylonian Theodicy
Dialogue of Pessimism	1.155	Dialogue of Pessimism or the Obliging Slave	600–601	The Dialogue of Pessimism
	1.171	Gilgamesh and Akka	45–47	Gilgamesh and Agga
Dialogue between a Man and His God	1.179	"Man and his God"	589–591	Man and His God
Autobiography of Ahmose Pen-Nekhebet	2.1	The Tomb Biography of Ahmose of Nekheb	233–234	The Expulsion of the Hyksos
	2.2A	The Annals of Thutmose III	234B–238	The Annals in Karnak
	2.2B	The Gebel Barkal Stela of Thutmose III	238C, 240D-C	The Barkal Stela
	2.2C	The Armant Stela of Thutmose III	234 A	The Armant Stela
	2.3	The Memphis and Karnak Stelae of Amenhotep II	245–247	The Memphis and Karnak Stelae
Karnak	2.4A	[Sethos I] Karnak, Campaign from Sile to Pa-Canaan, Year 1	254C, 254A, 254D	Campaigns of Seti I in Asia
Karnak	2.4C	[Sethos I] Karnak, Campaign to Yenoam and Lebanon (Year 1 or Later)	254C	Campaigns of Seti I in Asia
Beisan steles	2.4B	[Sethos I] First Beth-Shan Stela, Year 1	253–254	A Campaign of Seti I in Northern Palestine
Beisan steles	2.4D	[Sethos I] Second Beth-Shan Stela, Year Lost	255	Beth-Shan Stelae of Seti I and Ramses II
Kadesh inscriptions	2.5A	[Ramesses II] The Battle of Qadesh — The Poem, or Literary Record	255–256	The Asiatic Campaigning of Ramses II
Merneptah Stele	2.6	The (Israel) Stela of Merneptah	376–378	Hymn of Victory of Mer-ne-ptah (The "Israel Stela”)
	2.10	Coffin Text 159	33	The Fields of Paradise
	2.12	Book of the Dead 125	34–36	The Protestation of Guiltlessness
Mesha Stele	2.23	The Inscription of King Mesha	320–321	The Moabite Stone
Siloam inscription	2.28	The Siloam Tunnel Inscription	321	The Siloam Inscription
Yehimilk inscription	2.29	The Inscription of King Yahimilk	653–654	Yehimilk of Byblos
Kilamuwa Stela	2.30	The Kulamuwa Inscription	654–655	Kilamuwa of Y'dy-Sam'al
Yehawmilk Stele	2.32	The Inscription of King Yehawmilk	656	Yehawmilk of Byblos
Stele of Zakkur	2.35	The Inscription of Zakkur, King of Hamath	655–656	Zakir of Hamat and Lu`ath
Ahiram sarcophagus	2.55	The Sarcophagus Inscription of ‘Ahirom, King of Byblos	661	Ahiram of Byblos
Tabnit sarcophagus	2.56	The Sarcophagus Inscription of Tabnit, King of Sidon	662	Tabnit of Sidon
Sarcophagus of Eshmunazar II	2.57	The Sarcophagus Inscription of 'Eshmun`azor, King of Sidon	662	Eshmun`azar of Sidon
Sefire steles	2.82	The Inscription of Bar Ga'yah and Mati`el from Sefire	659–661	The Treaty between KTK and Arpad
Gezer calendar	2.85	The Gezer Calendar	320	The Gezer Calendar
Arslan Tash amulets	2.86	An Amulet from Arslan Tash	658	The Amulet from Arslan Tash
Kurkh Monoliths	2.113A	[Shalmaneser III] Kurkh Monolith	277–278	[Shalmaneser III] Annalistic Reports (i 29 – ii 13)
	2.113B	[Shalmaneser III] Annals: Assur Clay Tablets	Cf. 278–279	[Shalmaneser III] Annalistic Reports
	2.113C	[Shalmaneser III] Annals" Calah Bulls	279–280	[Shalmaneser III] Annalistic Reports (Bull Inscription)
Black Obelisk of Shalmaneser III	2.113F	[Shalmaneser III] Black Obelisk	278–281	[Shalmaneser III] Annalistic Reports (Black Obelisk)
	2.113G	[Shalmaneser III] Assur Basalt Statue	280	[Shalmaneser III] Various Inscriptions (a)
	2.113H	[Shalmaneser III] Black Stone Cylinder	281	[Shalmaneser III] Various Inscriptions (c)
Saba'a Stele	2.114E	[Adad-nirari III] Saba'a Stela	282	[Adad-Nirari III] (b) Saba'a Stela
	2.117A	[Tiglath-Pileser III] The Calah Annals	282–283	[Tiglath-Pileser III] Annalistic Records (103-133)
	2.117C	[Tiglath-Pileser III] Summary Inscription 4	283–284	[Tiglath-Pileser III] Annalistic Records (1-34)
Annals of Sargon II	2.118A	[Sargon II] The Annals	285	[Sargon II] From Annalistic Reports (23-57)
Sargon Stele	2.118E	[Sargon II] The Great “Summary" Inscription	284–285	[Sargon II] Inscriptions of a General Nature (1)
Annals of Sargon II	2.118F	[Sargon II] The Small “Summary" Inscription	285	[Sargon II] From Annalistic Reports (11-15)
Sargon II's Prisms	2.118i	[Sargon II] The Nimrud Inscription	287	[Sargon II] From Broken Prisms (3)
Sennacherib's Annals	2.119B	Sennacherib's Siege of Jerusalem	287–288	[Sennacherib] (a) The Siege of Jerusalem
Cyrus Cylinder	2.124	Cyrus Cylinder	315–316	Cyrus
Laws of Eshnunna	2.130	The Laws of Eshnunna	161–163	The Laws of Eshnunna
Code of Hammurabi	2.131	The Laws of Hammurabi	163–180	The Code of Hammurabi
	2.132	The Middle Assyrian Laws	180–188	The Middle Assyrian Laws
	2.133	The Neo-Babylonian Laws	197–198	The Neo-Babylonian Laws
Code of Ur-Nammu	2.153	The Laws of Ur-Nammu	523–525	The Laws of Ur-Nammu
Lipit-Ishtar	2.154	The Laws of Lipit-Ishtar	159–161	Lipit-Ishtar Lawcode
Gudea cylinders	2.155	The Cylinders of Gudea	268–269	Gudea, ENSI of Lagash
	3.2	The Craft of the Scribe	475–479	A Satirical Letter
Papyrus Anastasi I	3.3	Praise of Pi-Ramessu (Papyrus Anastasi I)	471	In Praise of the City Ramses
	3.4	A Report of Escaped Laborers (Papyrus Anastasi V)	259	The Pursuit of Runaway Slaves
	3.5	A Report of Bedouin (Papyrus Anastasi VI)	259	The Report of a Frontier Official
Judicial Papyrus of Turin	3.8	The Turin Judicial Papyrus (The Harem Conspiracy against Ramesses III)	214–216	Results of a Trial for Conspiracy
	3.10	A Lawsuit over a Syrian Slave	216–217	From the Record of a Lawsuit
Yavne-Yam ostracon	3.41	The Mesad Hashavyahu (Yavneh Yam) Ostracon	568	A Letter from the Time of Josiah
Lachish letters	3.42A	Lachish Ostraca [2]	322	Lachish Ostracon II
Lachish letters	3.42B	Lachish Ostraca [3]	322	Lachish Ostracon III
Lachish letters	3.42C	Lachish Ostraca [4]	322	Lachish Ostracon IV
Lachish letters	3.42D	Lachish Ostraca [5]	322	Lachish Ostracon V
Lachish letters	3.42E	Lachish Ostraca [6]	322	Lachish Ostracon VI
Lachish letters	3.42F	Lachish Ostraca [9]	322	Lachish Ostracon IX
Arad ostraca	3.43A	Arad Ostraca [1]	569B	Three Ostraca from Arad (A)
Arad ostraca	3.43H	Arad Ostraca [17]	569C	Three Ostraca from Arad (B)
Arad ostraca	3.43i	Arad Ostraca [18]	569A	Three Ostraca from Arad (C)
Elephantine papyri and ostraca	3.46	[The Jedaniah Archive from Elephantine] The Passover Letter	491	"The Passover Papyrus"
Elephantine papyri and ostraca	3.51	[The Jedaniah Archive from Elephantine] Request for Letter of Recommendation (First Draft)	491–492	Petition for Authorization to Rebuild the Temple of Yaho
Elephantine papyri and ostraca	3.52	[The Jedaniah Archive from Elephantine] Recommendation for Reconstruction of Temple	492	Advice of the Governors of Juda and Samaria to the Jews of Elephantine
Elephantine papyri and ostraca	3.53	[The Jedaniah Archive from Elephantine] Offer of Payment for Reconstruction of Temple (Draft)	492	Petition by Elephantine Jews, Perhaps to Arsames
Elephantine papyri and ostraca	3.65	[The Mibtahiah Archive] Withdrawal from Goods	491	Settlement of Claim by Oath
Elephantine papyri and ostraca	3.87C	Offer to Sew a Garment	491	Letter from One Jew to Another of Superior Station
Elephantine papyri and ostraca	3.87E	Greetings from a Pagan to a Jew	491	Greeting from a Pagan to a Jew
Amarna letters	3.92A	Letter of Abdi-heba of Jerusalem (EA 286)	487–488	[The Amarna Letters] EA, No. 286
Amarna letters	3.92B	Letter of Abdi-heba of Jerusalem (EA 289)	489	[The Amarna Letters] EA, No. 289
Amarna letters	3.92C	Letter of the Ruler of Gazru (EA 292)	489–490	[The Amarna Letters] EA, No. 292
Amarna letters	3.92G	Letter of Lab'ayu of Shechem (EA 254)	486	[The Amarna Letters] EA, No. 254
	3.129	Inheritance of a Brother and Sister	545–546 (§ 14)	Litigation Concerning Inheritance
Dispute between a man and his Ba	3.146	The Dispute Between a Man and His Ba	405–407	A Dispute Over Suicide
Anzû	3.147	The Akkadian Anzu Story	514–517	The Myth of Zu

== See also ==
- Archaeology of Israel
- Assyro-Babylonian religion
- The Bible and history
- Biblical archaeology (excavations and artifacts)
- Canaanite and Aramaic inscriptions
- Cuneiform inscriptions found in Israel and Palestine
- Levantine archaeology
- Library of Ashurbanipal
- List of biblical figures identified in extra-biblical sources
- List of Egyptian papyri by date
- List of Hebrew Bible manuscripts
- List of proposed Assyrian references to Kingdom of Israel (Samaria)
- Model of Jerusalem in the Late 2nd Temple Period
- Near Eastern archaeology
- Nag Hammadi library – early Christian gnostic papyri.
- Non-canonical books referenced in the Bible
- Oxyrhynchus Papyri – collection of Old and New Testament papyri, Apocryphal works and works of Philo
