= Slavery in antiquity =

Slavery in the ancient world, from the earliest known recorded evidence in Sumer to the Mediterranean cultures of classical and late antiquity, comprised a mixture of debt-slavery, slavery as a punishment for crime, and the enslavement of prisoners of war.

Masters could free slaves, and in many cases, such freedmen went on to rise to positions of power. This would include those children born into slavery, but who were actually the children of the master of the house. The slave master would ensure that his children were not condemned to a life of slavery.

The institution of slavery condemned a majority of slaves to agricultural and industrial labor, and they lived hard lives. In many of these cultures, slaves formed a very large part of the economy, and in particular the Roman Empire and some of the Greek poleis built a large part of their wealth on slaves acquired through conquest.

== Near East ==
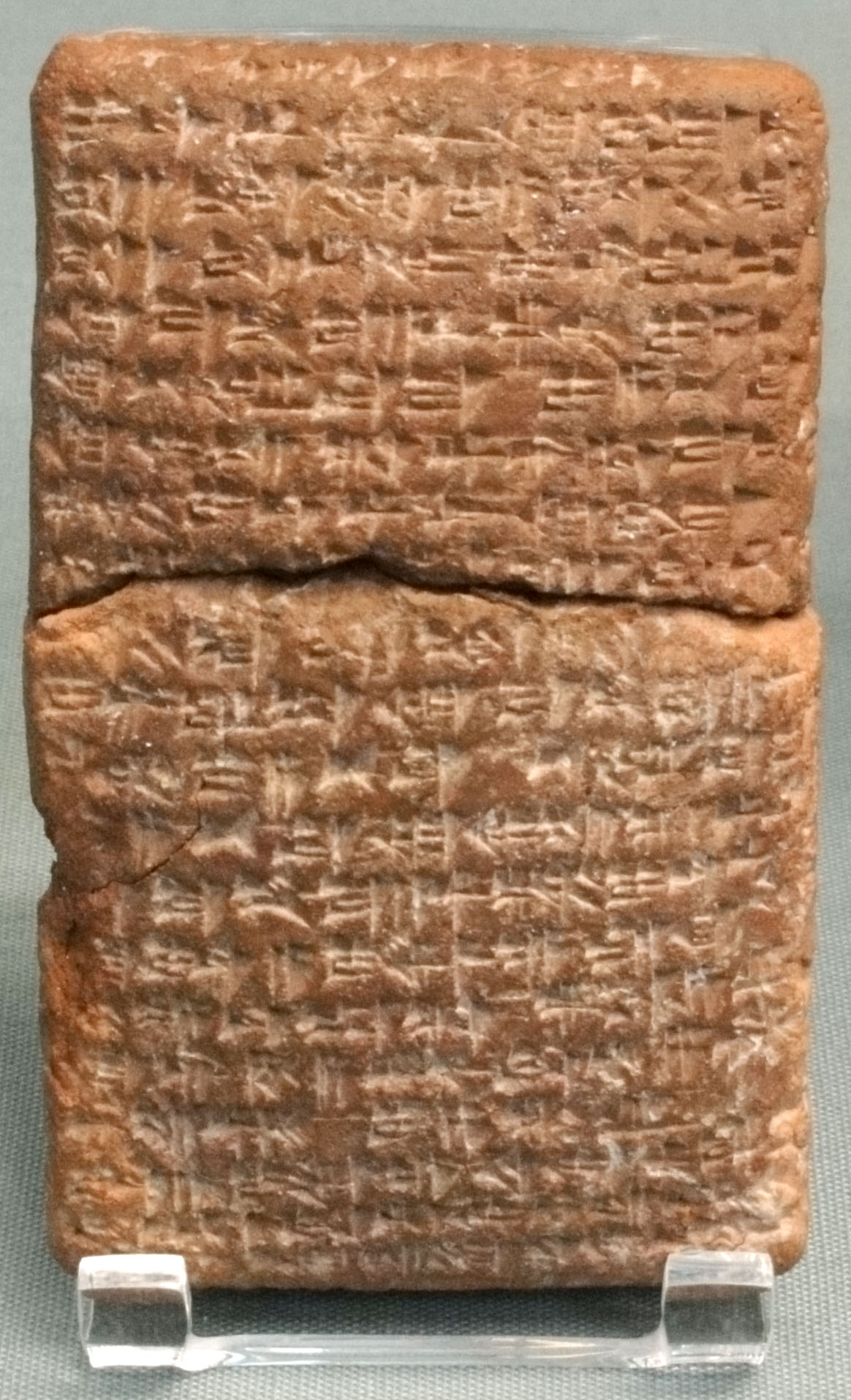
C. 1480 BC, fugitive slave treaty between Idrimi of Alakakh (now Tell Atchana) and Pillia of Kizzuwatna (now Cilicia). Ref:131447 .

=== Sumer ===
The Code of Ur-Nammu, the oldest known surviving law code, written c. 2100 – 2050 BCE, includes laws relating to slaves during the Third Dynasty of Ur in Sumerian Mesopotamia. It states that a slave that marries cannot be forced to leave the household, and that the bounty for returning a slave who has escaped the city is two shekels. It reveals that there were at least two major social strata at the time: those free, and those enslaved.

=== Babylon ===
The Babylonian Code of Hammurabi, written between 1755–1750 BC, also distinguishes between the free and the enslaved. Like the Code of Ur-Nammu, it offers a reward of two shekels for returning a fugitive slave, but unlike the other code, states that harbouring or assisting a fugitive was punishable by death. Slaves were either bought abroad, taken as prisoners in war, or enslaved as a punishment for being in debt or committing a crime. The Code of Hammurabi states that if a slave is purchased and within one month develops epilepsy ("benu-disease") then the purchaser can return the slave and receive a full refund. The code has laws relating to the purchase of slaves abroad. Numerous contracts for the sale of slaves survive. The final law in the Code of Hammurabi states that if a slave denies his master, then his ear will be cut off.

=== Hittites ===
Hittite texts from Anatolia include laws regulating the institution of slavery. Of particular interest is a law stipulating that reward for the capture of an escaped slave would be higher if the slave had already succeeded in crossing the Halys River and getting farther away from the center of Hittite civilization — from which it can be concluded that at least some of the slaves kept by the Hittites possessed a realistic chance of escaping and regaining their freedom, possibly by finding refuge with other kingdoms or ethnic groups.

=== In the Bible ===
In the Hebrew Bible (the Old Testament), there are many references to slaves, including rules of how they should behave and be treated. Slavery is viewed as routine, as an ordinary part of society. During jubilees, slaves were to be released, according to the Book of Leviticus. Israelite slaves were also to be released during their seventh year of service, according to the Deuteronomic Code. Non-Hebrew slaves and their offspring were the perpetual property of the owner's family, with limited exceptions. The Curse of Ham (Genesis 9:18–27) is an important passage related to slavery.

Scholars are divided as to the protections afforded to slaves in the Hebrew Bible. According to Peter J. Williams, biblical slavery differed greatly from Roman and modern slavery in that slaves mentioned in the Hebrew Bible received sexual protection and enough food, and were not chained, tortured or physically abused. However, according to Hilary Lipka, most scholars understand certain biblical laws to involve, for instance, daughters being sold as slaves for sexual and reproductive use by their masters.

In the New Testament, slaves are told to obey their owners, who are in turn told to "stop threatening" their slaves. The Epistle to Philemon has many implications related to slavery.

== Egypt ==
Mummy soles depicting two Asian prisoners. Between 722 and 332 BC, Late Period of ancient Egypt. Museo Egizio, Turin.

In Ancient Egypt, slaves were mainly obtained through prisoners of war. Other ways people could become slaves was by inheriting the status from their parents. One could also become a slave on account of his inability to pay his debts. Slavery was the direct result of poverty. People also sold themselves into slavery because they were poor peasants and needed food and shelter. Slaves only attempted escape when their treatment was unusually harsh. For many, being a slave in Egypt made them better off than a freeman elsewhere. Young slaves could not be put to hard work and had to be brought up by the mistress of the household. Not all slaves went to houses. Some also sold themselves to temples or were assigned to temples by the king. Slave trading was not very popular until later in Ancient Egypt. But while slave trading eventually sprang up all over Egypt, there was little worldwide trade. Rather, the individual dealers seem to have approached their customers personally.

Only slaves with special traits were traded worldwide. Prices of slaves changed with time. Slaves with a special skill were more valuable than those without one. Slaves had plenty of jobs that they could be assigned to. Some had domestic jobs, like taking care of children, cooking, brewing, or cleaning. Some were gardeners or field hands in stables. They could be craftsmen or even get a higher status. For example, if they could write, they could become a manager of the master's estate. Captive slaves were mostly assigned to the temples or a king, and they had to do manual labor. The worst thing that could happen to a slave was being assigned to the quarries and mines. Private ownership of slaves, captured in war and given by the king to their captor, certainly occurred at the beginning of the Eighteenth Dynasty (1550–1295 BCE). Sales of slaves occurred in the Twenty-fifth Dynasty (732–656 BCE), and contracts of servitude survive from the Twenty-sixth Dynasty (c. 672 – 525 BCE) and from the reign of Darius: apparently such a contract then required the consent of the slave.

== Greece ==
The study of slavery in Ancient Greece remains a complex subject, in part because of the many different levels of servility, from traditional chattel slave through various forms of serfdom, such as helots, penestai, and several other classes of non-citizens.

Most philosophers of classical antiquity defended slavery as a natural and necessary institution. Aristotle believed that the practice of any manual or banausic job should disqualify the practitioner from citizenship. Quoting Euripides, Aristotle declared all non-Greeks slaves by birth, fit for nothing but obedience.

By the late 4th century BCE passages start to appear from other Greeks, especially in Athens, which opposed slavery and suggested that every person living in a city-state had the right to freedom subject to no one, except those laws decided using majoritarianism. Alcidamas, for example, said: "God has set everyone free. No one is made a slave by nature." Furthermore, a fragment of a poem of Philemon also shows that he opposed slavery.

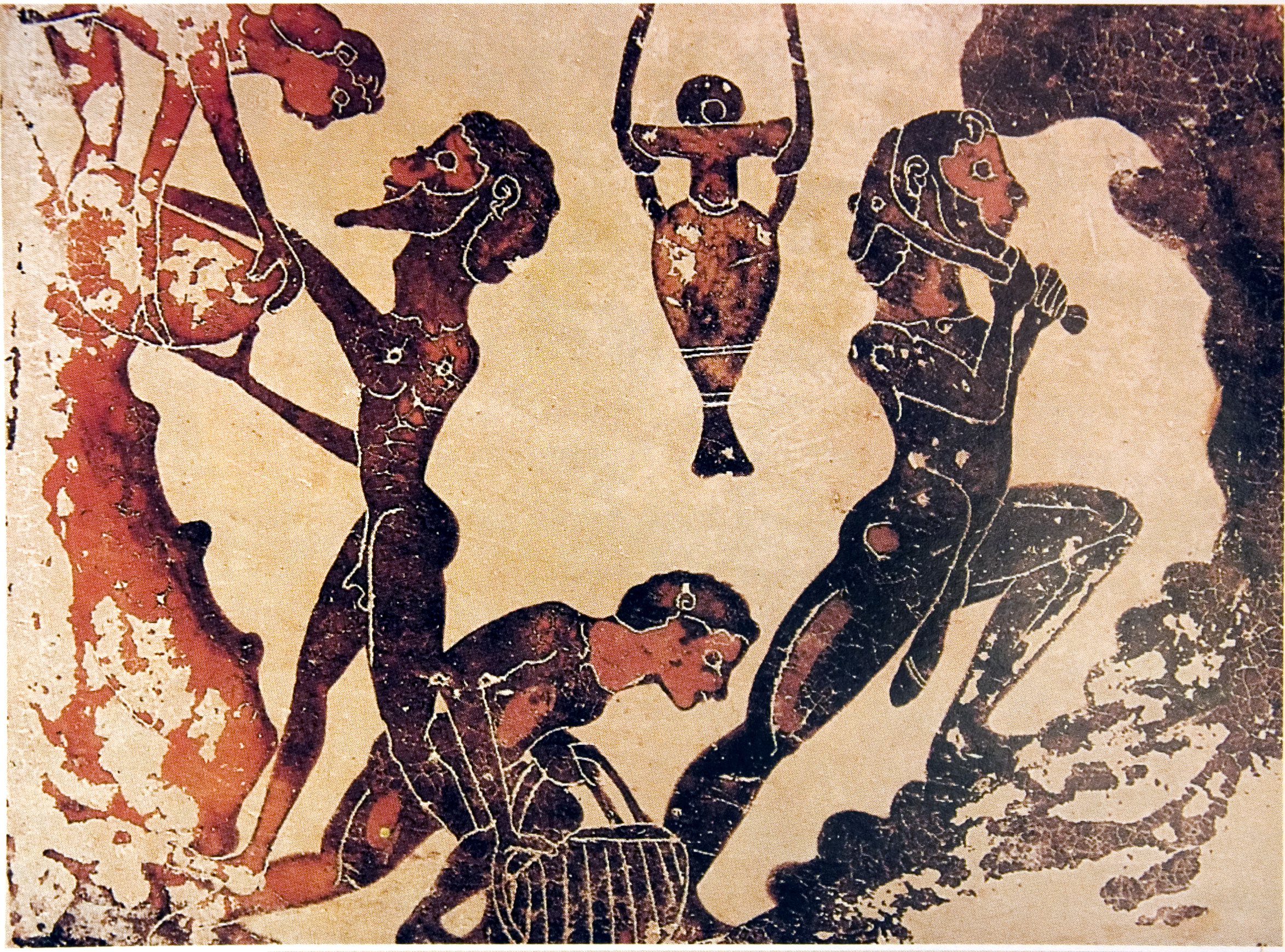
Corinthian black-figure terra-cotta votive tablet of slaves working in a mine, dated to the late seventh century BC

Greece in pre-Roman times consisted of many independent city-states, each with its own laws. All of them permitted slavery, but the rules differed greatly from region to region. Greek slaves had some opportunities for emancipation, though all of these came at some cost to their masters. The law protected slaves, and though a slave's master had the right to beat him at will, a number of moral and cultural limitations existed on excessive use of force by masters.

In ancient Athens, about 10-30% of the population were slaves. The system in Athens encouraged slaves to save up to purchase their freedom, and records survive of slaves operating businesses by themselves, making only a fixed tax-payment to their masters. Athens also had a law forbidding the striking of slaves—if a person struck an apparent slave in Athens, that person might find himself hitting a fellow-citizen, because many citizens dressed no better. It startled other Greeks that Athenians tolerated back-chat from slaves (Old Oligarch, Constitution of the Athenians). Pausanias (writing nearly seven centuries after the event) states that Athenian slaves fought together with Athenian freemen in the Battle of Marathon, and the monuments memorialize them. Spartan serfs, Helots, could win freedom through bravery in battle. Plutarch mentions that during the Battle of Salamis Athenians did their best to save their "women, children and slaves".

On the other hand, much of the wealth of Athens came from its silver mines at Laurion, where slaves, working in extremely poor conditions, produced the greatest part of the silver (although recent excavations seem to suggest the presence of free workers at Laurion). During the Peloponnesian War between Athens and Sparta, twenty thousand Athenian slaves, including both mine-workers and artisans, escaped to the Spartans when their army camped at Decelea in 413 BC.

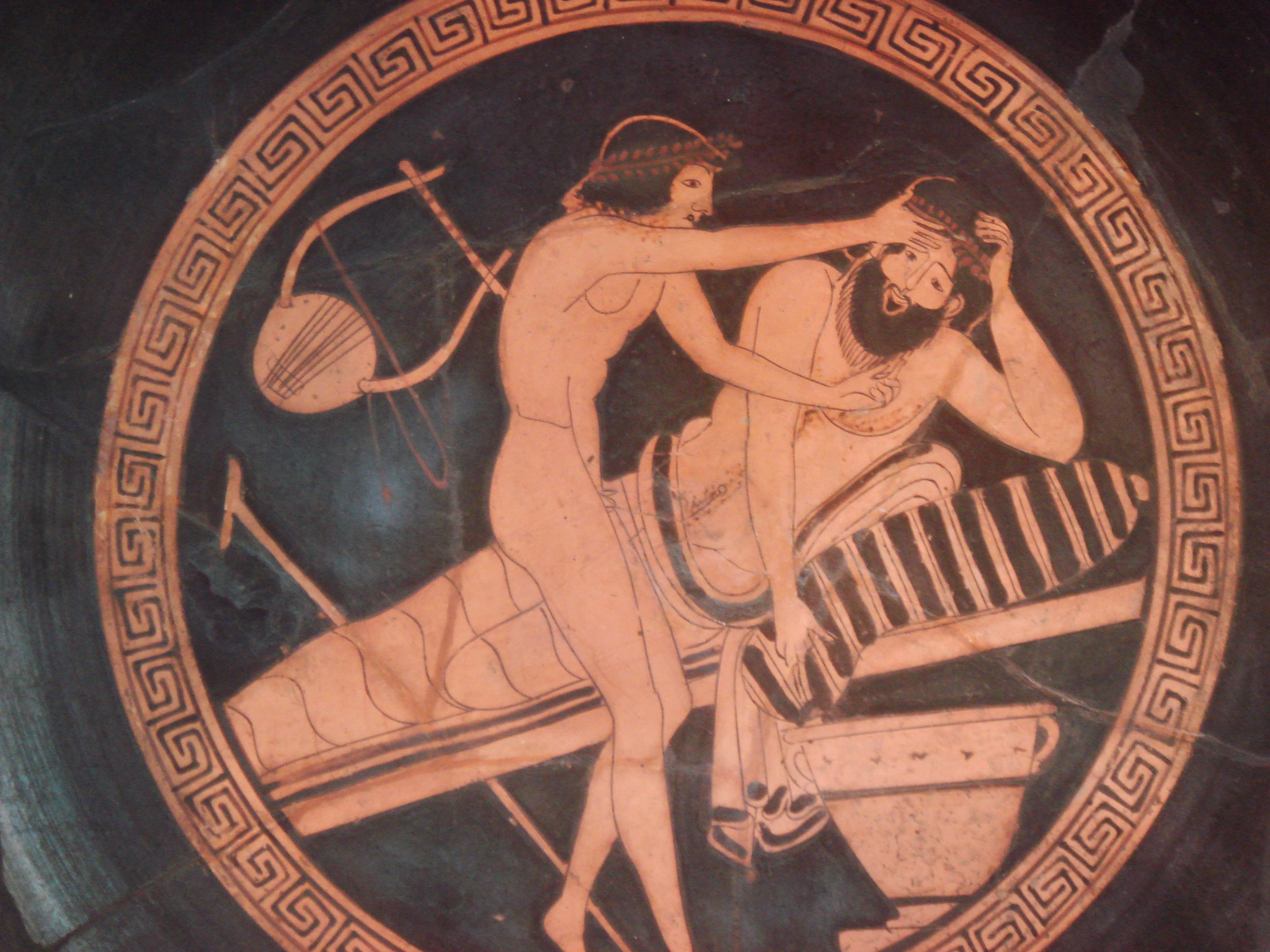
A drunk man vomiting, while a young slave is holding his forehead. Brygos Painter, 500-470 BC

Other than flight, resistance on the part of slaves occurred only rarely. GEM de Ste. Croix gives two reasons:

1. slaves came from various regions and spoke various languages
2. a slave-holder could rely on the support of fellow slave-holders if his slaves offered resistance.

Athens had various categories of slave, such as:

- House-slaves, living in their master's home and working at home, on the land or in a shop.
- Freelance slaves, who didn't live with their master but worked in their master's shop or fields and paid him taxes from money they got from their own properties (insofar as society allowed slaves to own property).
- Public slaves, who worked as police-officers, ushers, secretaries, street-sweepers, etc.
- War-captives (andrapoda) who served primarily in unskilled tasks at which they could be chained: for example, rowers in commercial ships, or miners.

In some areas of Greece there existed a class of unfree laborers tied to the land and called penestae in Thessaly and helots in Sparta. Penestae and helots did not rate as chattel slaves; one could not freely buy and sell them.

The comedies of Menander show how the Athenians preferred to view a house-slave: as an enterprising and unscrupulous rascal, who must use his wits to profit from his master, rescue him from his troubles, or gain him the girl of his dreams. These plots were adapted by the Roman playwrights Plautus and Terence, and in the modern era influenced the character Jeeves and A Funny Thing Happened on the Way to the Forum.

== Rome ==
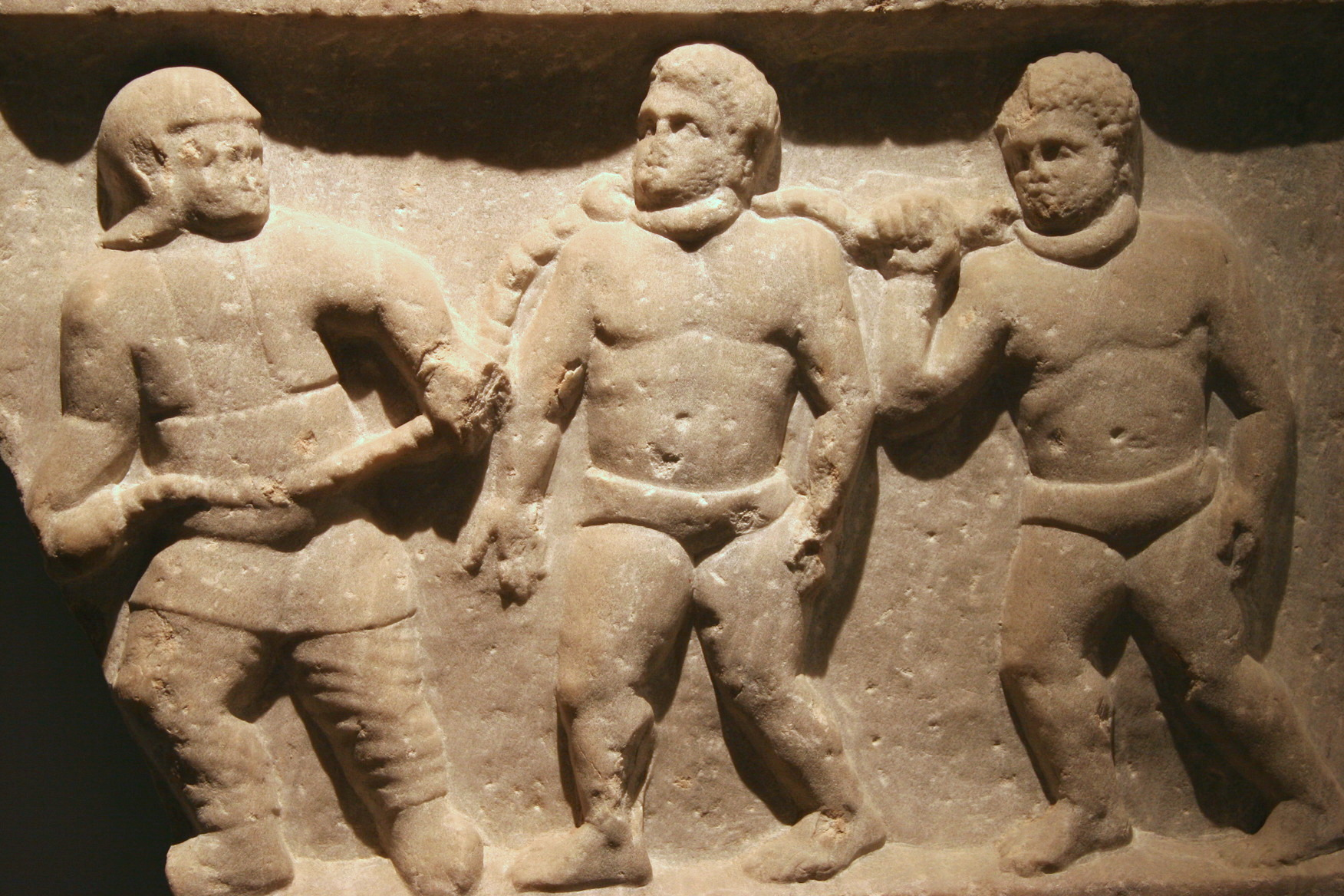
Relief from Smyrna (present-day İzmir, Turkey) depicting a Roman soldier leading captives in chains

Rome differed from Greek city-states in allowing freed slaves to become citizens. After manumission, a male slave who had belonged to a citizen enjoyed not only passive freedom from ownership, but also active political freedom (libertas), including the right to vote, though he could not run for public office. During the period of the Roman Republic (c. 509 to 27 BCE), Roman military expansion produced a large number of captive slaves.

Besides manual labor, Roman slaves performed many domestic services, and might be assigned to highly skilled jobs and professions. Teachers, accountants, and physicians were often slaves. Slaves from the Greek world in particular might be highly educated. Unskilled slaves, or those condemned to slavery as punishment, worked on farms, in mines, and at mills.

In late antiquity, slaves in the Roman world are known to have sometimes worn metal slave collars: about forty-five examples are known, mostly from Italy with a few from Roman Africa, typically consisting of an iron or lead neck ring riveted shut and fitted with a Latin-inscribed tag. The texts often instruct passersby to detain the wearer and return them to a named owner; in the case of the Zoninus collar, the inscription even promises a gold coin as a reward for doing so. Literary references to short phrases tattooed or branded on the foreheads of runaway slaves (for example, "I have escaped; catch me") have led scholars to view these collars as punitive restraints imposed after an escape attempt and as a later alternative to such facial marks, allowing longer and more detailed messages. Some collars carry Christian symbols (such as a palm branch or Chi-Rho), and one example from Bulla Regia explicitly identifies a female slave with the words Adultera meretrix, possibly marking her as a prostitute; her remains were found still wearing the collar.

== The "barbarian" world ==
Herodotus (5th century BCE) recounts a lurid tale featuring slaves held by the Scythians.

Roman sources records various tribes of Europe as owning slaves.

Strabo (c. 64 BCE to 24 CE) notes slaves as an export commodity from Britannia, At Llyn Cerrig Bach in Anglesey, an iron gang-chain dated to 100 BCE-50 CE has been found, over 3 metres long with neck-rings for five captives. In his 6th century Institutes, the emperor Justinian classified slavery under International Law (Ius Gentium), because, he said, "every nation practices it." It was therein listed as an alternative to killing war-captives.

In late antiquity, the Huns could enslave captives, hold them for ransom, enlist them in Hun armies, or sell them on the market; but being themselves a nomadic people, Huns kept few domestic slaves.

== See also ==
- History of slavery
- Slavery in ancient Babylon
- Slavery in ancient Egypt
- Slavery in ancient Greece
- Slavery in ancient Rome
  - Contubernium
  - Ancillae
- Black Sea slave trade
- Red Sea slave trade
- Trans-Saharan slave trade
- Bukhara slave trade
- Sogdian slave trade
