= Repudiation =

Repudiation may refer to:

- Repudiation (marriage), the formal act by which a husband forcibly renounces his wife in certain cultures and religions
- Disownment, the formal act by which a parent forcibly renounces his child
- Anticipatory repudiation is a term in the law of contracts that describes a declaration by one party (the promising party) to a contract that they do not intend to live up to their obligations under the contract
- Non-repudiation is the concept of ensuring that a party in a dispute cannot repudiate, or refute the validity of a statement or contract
- Repudiation (religion), the act of refusing and no longer accepting a philosophical or religious doctrine
