= Cuneiform law =

Ancient legal codes written in cuneiform script

Cuneiform law refers to any of the legal codes written in cuneiform script that were developed and used throughout the ancient Middle East among the Sumerians, Babylonians, Assyrians, Elamites, Hurrians, Kassites, and Hittites. The Code of Hammurabi is the best-known of the cuneiform laws, but there were a number of precursor laws.

== Features ==
Although they were written in several different cities and kingdoms, these early laws have a number of formulae in common. Most contain both an epilogue and a prologue, which usually explain the purpose of composing the laws, invoke divine authority, and command the reader to abide by them. They are always imposed or 'enacted' in the name of a ruler—be it a prince or king—and show no sign of being the result of legislative bodies.

While many of these codes are only partially known, they still paint a fairly clear picture that enables us to learn what issues pertaining to rules were considered significant by the societies they governed in the 3rd, 2nd, and 1st millennia BC.

Unlike modern codes, Cuneiform law provides no universal formula for general areas of law. Rather, laws typically consist of specific "if... then..." cases that are meant to act as an example or precedent. Punishments for crimes vary from code to code, but not all prescribe vengeance. Some call only for fines in certain instances, such as in the Code of Ur-Nammu, where one line reads: "If a man knocks out the eye of another man, he shall weigh out one-half a mina of silver." These cases are sometimes arranged in a seemingly random order, though this may be the result of an inability to properly interpret them today as they would have been at the time they were enforced.

Cuneiform law is generally classified separately from later Middle Eastern law, but has been viewed as a predecessor of Biblical and Jewish law. The Middle Eastern communities that made use of cuneiform law were generally all in contact with one another, and developed similar cultures. Akkadian, a cuneiform language, was used throughout the entire area and beyond, reaching Egypt as a means of diplomatic communication during the Amarna Period.

== Timeline ==
- c. 2400 BC – The code of law found at Ebla
- c. 2350 BC – Reforms of Urukagina of Lagash – not extant, but referenced in other sources.
- c. 2060 BC – Code of Ur-Nammu (or Shulgi?) of Ur – Neo-Sumerian (Ur-III). Earliest code of which fragments have been discovered. The code speaks of witchcraft and the flight of slaves.
- c. 1934-1924 BC – Code of Lipit-Ishtar of Isin – With a typical epilogue and prologue, the law deals with penalties, the rights of ordinary people, right of kings, marriages, and more.
- c. 1800 BC – Laws of the city of Eshnunna (sometimes ascribed to king Bilalama)
- Babylonian law
  - c. 1758 BC – Code of Hammurabi – The most famous and also most preserved of the ancient laws. Discovered in December 1901, it contains over 282 paragraphs of text, not including the prologue and epilogue.
- c. 1500-1300 BC – Assyrian law
- c. 1500-1400 BC – Hittite laws

== Gallery ==
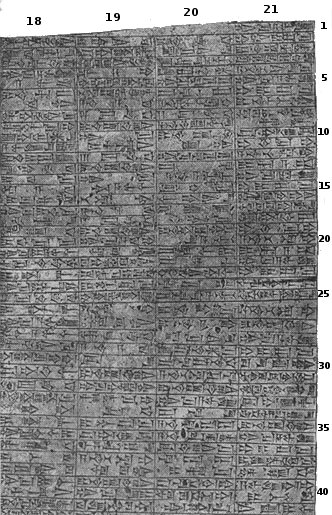
An inscription of the Code of Hammurabi

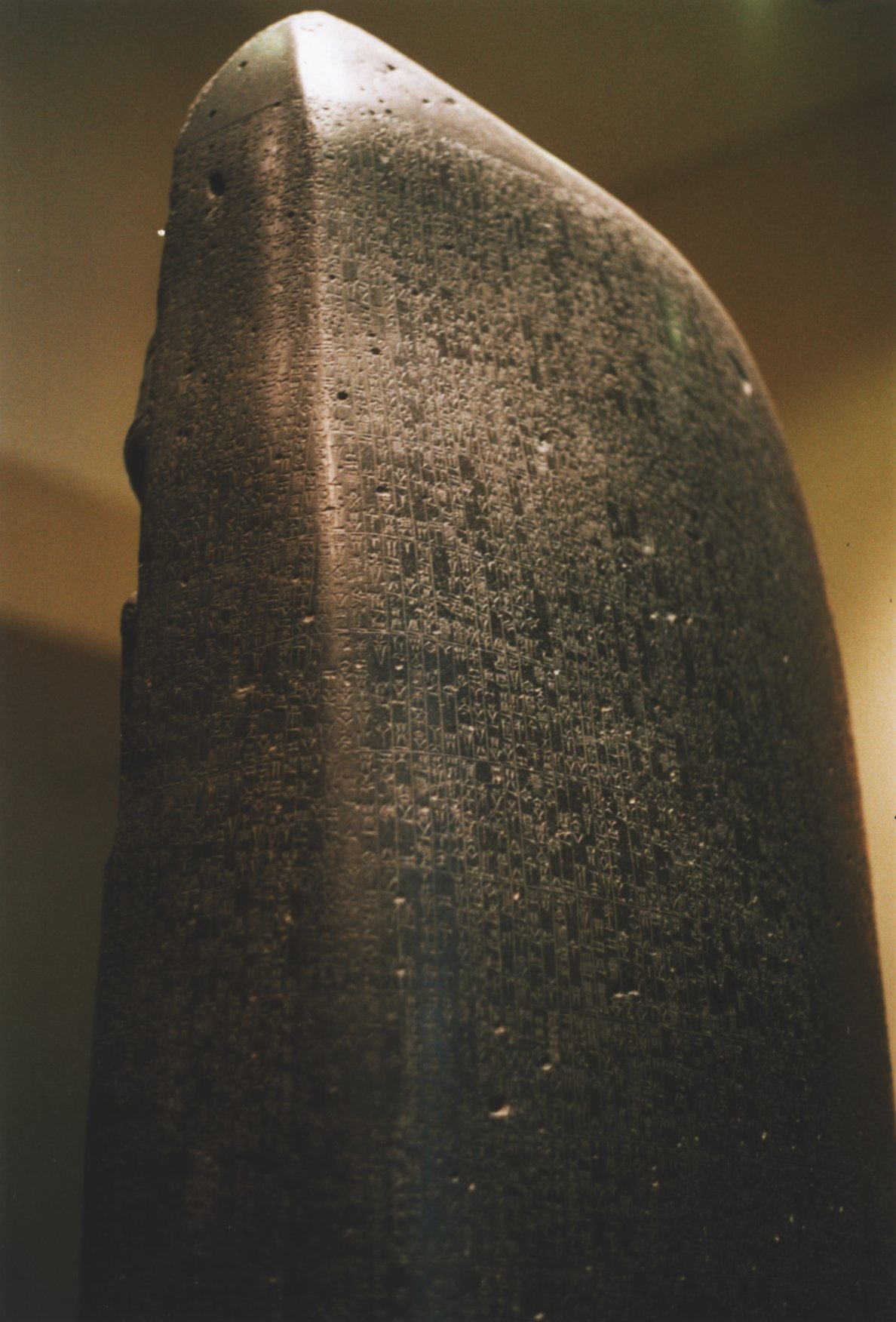
Code of Hammurabi

== See also ==
- List of ancient legal codes
