= Laws of Eshnunna =

c. 1930 BC law code from Iraq

The Laws of Eshnunna (abrv. LE) are inscribed on two cuneiform tablets discovered in Tell Abū Harmal, Baghdad, Iraq. The Iraqi Directorate of Antiquities headed by Taha Baqir unearthed two parallel sets of tablets in 1945 and 1947. The two tablets are separate copies of an older source and date back to c. 1930 BC. An additional fragment was later found at Me-Turan. The differences between the Code of Hammurabi and the Laws of Eshnunna significantly contributed to illuminating the development of ancient and cuneiform law.

In distinction from the other Mesopotamian collections of law, this one got its name after the city where it had originated – Eshnunna, located on the bank of the Diyala River, tributary to the Tigris, north of Ur. Eshnunna became politically important after the fall of the third dynasty of Ur, founded by Ur-Nammu.

The law code is also notable for it having the earliest recorded mention of rabies. It prescribed that an owner of a dog with symptoms of rabies was to take preventative measures against that dog biting people and that an owner of a dog who bit someone who then died was to be heavily fined.

== Contents ==
This collection of laws is not a real systemized codex; nearly sixty of its sections are preserved. The Laws are written in Akkadian and consist of two tablets which are marked with A and B. In 1948, Albrecht Goetze of Yale University had translated and published them. In some sources the Laws of Eshnunna are mentioned as the Laws of Bilalama due to the belief that the Eshnunnian ruler probably was their originator, but Goetze maintained that tablet B was originated under the reign of Dadusha. The text of the prologue is broken at the point where the ruler who promulgated the laws was specified.

Albrecht Goetze has noticed the specific style of expression. The laws were composed in a mode that facilitated memorizing. A distinguished Israeli scientist and one of the foremost experts on this collection of laws, Reuven Yaron of the University of Jerusalem concerning this matter stated: "What matters to me – and might have mattered to those who fashioned them almost 4000 years ago – is the ease of remembering the text."

The conditional sentence ("If A then B" – as it also is the case with the other Mesopotamian laws) is an attribute of this codification. In 23 paragraphs, it appears in the form šumma awilum – "If a man..." After the disposition, a precise sanction follows, e.g. LU42(A): "If a man bit and severed the nose of a man, one mina silver he shall weigh out."

The Laws clearly show signs of social stratification, mainly focusing on two different classes: the muškenum and awilum. The audience of the Laws of Eshnunna is more extensive than in the case of the earlier cuneiform codifications: awilum – free men and women (mar awilim and marat awilim), muškenum, wife (aššatum), son (maru), slaves of both sexes – male (wardum) and female (amtum) – which are not only objects of law as in classical slavery, and delicts where the victims were slaves have been sanctioned, and other class designations as ubarum, apþarum, mudum that are not ascertained.

Reuven Yaron has divided the offences of the Laws of Eshnunna into five groups. The articles of the first group had to be collected from all over the Laws and the articles of the other four were roughly ordered one after the other:

1. Theft and related offences,
2. False distraint,
3. Sexual offences,
4. Bodily injuries,
5. Damages caused by a goring ox and comparable cases.

The majority of these offences were penalized with pecuniary fines (an amount of silver), but some serious offences such as burglary, murder, and sexual offences were penalized with death. It seems that the capital punishment was avoidable (in contrast to the Code of Hammurabi), because of the standard formulation: "It is a case of life ... he shall die".

== See also ==
- Akkadian Empire
- Eshnunna
- Cuneiform law
- Code of Hammurabi
- Code of Ur-Nammu
- Code of Lipit-Ishtar
- List of ancient legal codes
