= Code of Ur-Nammu =

Oldest surviving law code, from Mesopotamia

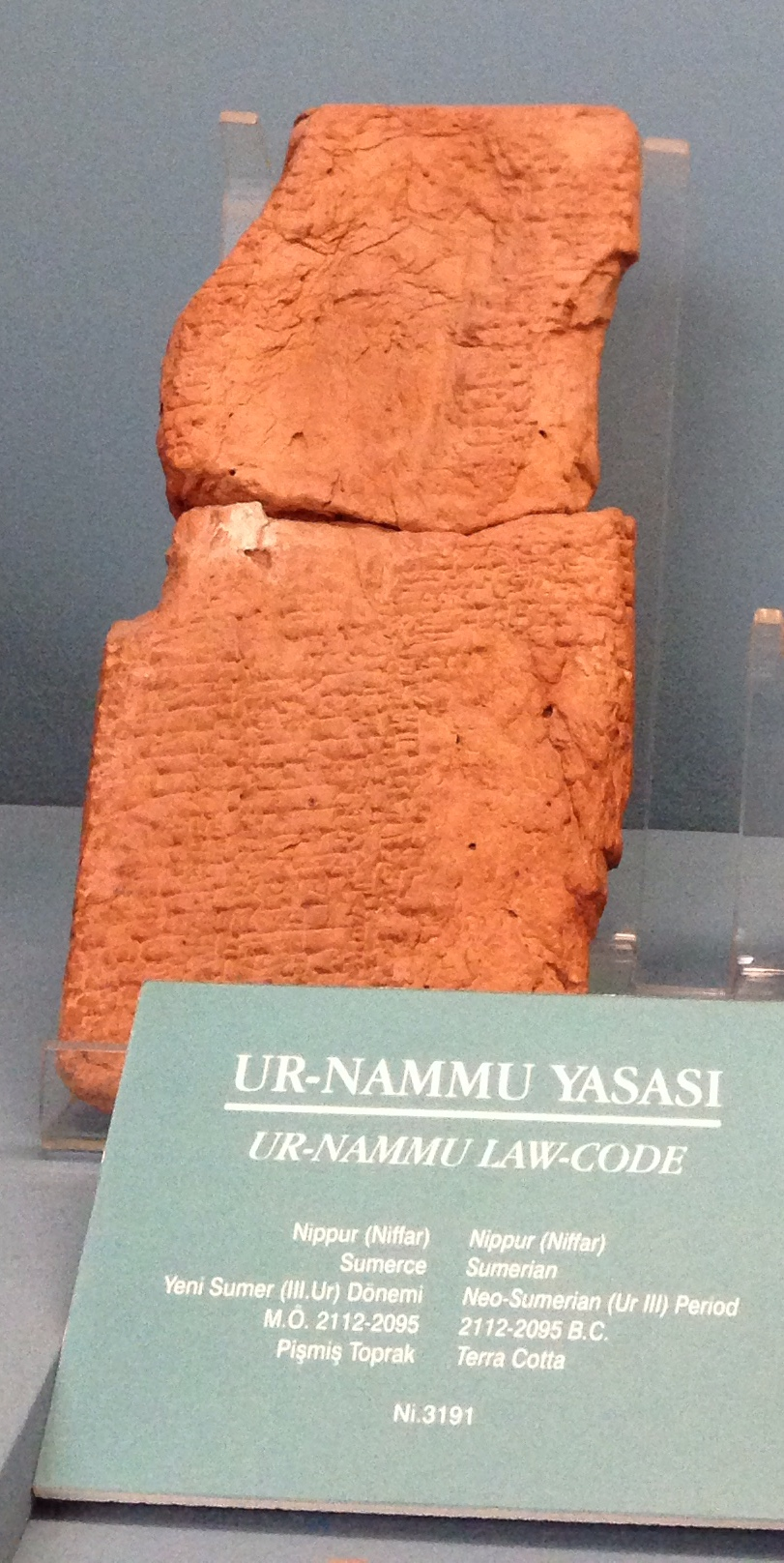
- The first known version of the code in its current location
- Created: c. 2100 BC
- Location: Istanbul Archaeology Museums (Ni.3191) (originally Nippur, Mesopotamia (modern-day Iraq))
- Author: Ur-Nammu
- Purpose: Legal code

The Code of Ur-Nammu is the oldest known surviving law code. It is from Mesopotamia and is written on tablets, in the Sumerian language. It contains strong statements of royal power like "I eliminated enmity, violence, and cries for justice."

Ur-Nammu's codes and reforms have been seen as some of the earliest documented cases of regard for widows, orphans, and the poor in the Fertile Crescent.

== Discovery ==
The first recension of the code (Ni 3191), an Old Babylonian period copy in two fragments found at Nippur, in what is now Iraq, was translated by Samuel Kramer in 1952. These fragments are held at the Istanbul Archaeology Museums. Owing to its partial preservation, only the long prologue and five of the laws were discernible. Kramer noted that luck was involved in the discovery:

In all probability I would have missed the Ur-Nammu tablet altogether had it not been for an opportune letter from F. R. Kraus, now Professor of Cuneiform Studies at the University of Leiden in Holland ... His letter said that some years ago, in the course of his duties as curator in the Istanbul Museum, he had come upon two fragments of a tablet inscribed with Sumerian laws, had made a "join" of the two pieces, and had catalogued the resulting tablet as No. 3191 of the Nippur collection of the Museum ... Since Sumerian law tablets are extremely rare, I had No. 3191 brought to my working table at once. There it lay, a sun-baked tablet, light brown in color, 20 by 10 centimeters in size. More than half of the writing was destroyed, and what was preserved seemed at first hopelessly unintelligible. But after several days of concentrated study, its contents began to become clear and take shape, and I realized with no little excitement that what I held in my hand was a copy of the oldest law code as yet known to man.

— Samuel Kramer, History begins at Sumer

Two further Old Babylonian period tablet fragments (IM 85688+85689) now held at Iraq Museum in Baghdad, with no prologue or concluding formula, were found in Ur and translated in 1965, allowing some 30 of the 57 laws to be reconstructed. Two Old Babylonian period exemplars were found in Sippar. One (Si 277), held at the Istanbul Museum, bears the prologue and lines 125-79. The other (BM 54722+), held at the British Museum, bears the laws and part of the concluding formula. A clay cylinder (MS 2064) of unknown origin and provenance contains 8 (of 10) columns at least partially preserved. It has been dated to the Ur III period and is held in the Schoyen Collection.

== Background ==
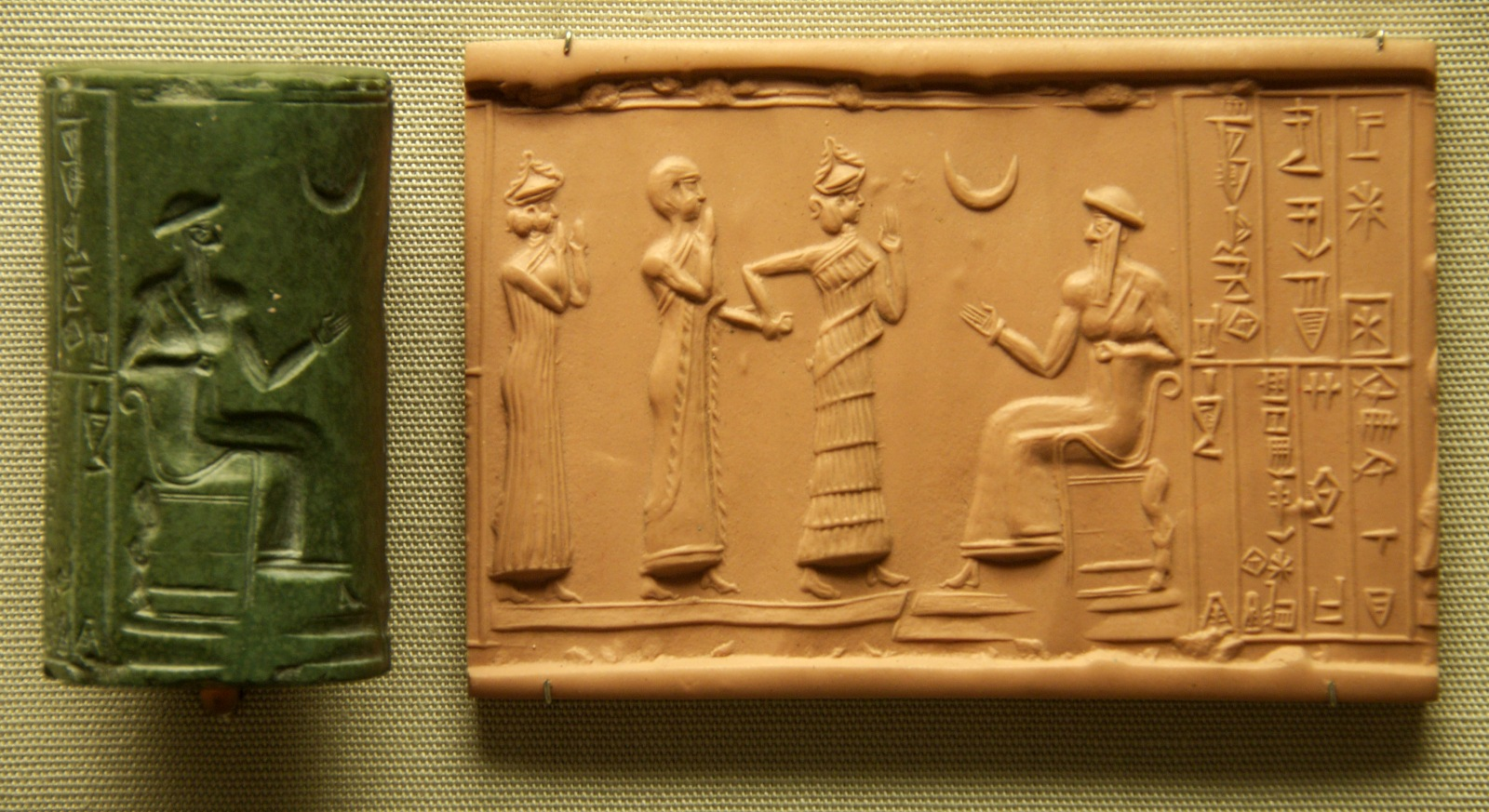
The Sumerian King Ur-Nammu (seated), the creator of the Code of Ur-Nammu, bestows governorship on Ḫašḫamer, ensi of Iškun-Sin (cylinder seal impression, c. 2100 BC)

The preface directly credits the laws to king Ur-Nammu of Ur (2112–2095 BC). The author who had the laws written onto cuneiform tablets is still somewhat under dispute. Some scholars have attributed it to Ur-Nammu's son Shulgi.

Although it is known that earlier law-codes existed, such as the Code of Urukagina, this represents the earliest extant legal text. It is three centuries older than the Code of Hammurabi. The laws are arranged in casuistic form of IF (crime) THEN (punishment)—a pattern followed in nearly all later codes. It institutes fines of monetary compensation for bodily damage as opposed to the later lex talionis ('eye for an eye') principle of Babylonian law. However, murder, robbery, adultery and rape were capital offenses.

The code reveals a glimpse at societal structure during Ur's Third Dynasty. Beneath the lugal ("great man" or king), all members of society belonged to one of two basic strata: the lu or free person, or the slave (male: arad; female: geme). The son of a lu was called a dumu-nita until he married, becoming a "young man" (gurus). A woman (munus) went from being a daughter (dumu-mi) to a wife (dam), then if she outlived her husband, a widow (nu-ma-su), who could remarry.

In one section, regarding slaves, ur-Nammu contrasts law under Gutian rule with the new law implemented by Ur-Nammu at the beginning of his rule.

== Content ==
The prologue, typical of Mesopotamian law codes, invokes the deities for Ur-Nammu's kingship, Nanna and Utu, and decrees "equity in the land".

... After An and Enlil had turned over the Kingship of Ur to Nanna, at that time did Ur-Nammu, son born of Ninsun, for his beloved mother who bore him, in accordance with his principles of equity and truth ... Then did Ur-Nammu the mighty warrior, king of Ur, king of Sumer and Akkad, by the might of Nanna, lord of the city, and in accordance with the true word of Utu, establish equity in the land; he banished malediction, violence and strife, and set the monthly Temple expenses at 90 gur of barley, 30 sheep, and 30 sila of butter. He fashioned the bronze sila-measure, standardized the one-mina weight, and standardized the stone weight of a shekel of silver in relation to one mina ... The orphan was not delivered up to the rich man; the widow was not delivered up to the mighty man; the man of one shekel was not delivered up to the man of one mina.

One mina (1/60 of a talent) was made equal to 60 shekels (1 shekel = 8.3 grams, or 0.3 oz).

=== Surviving laws ===
Among the surviving laws are these:

1. If a man commits a murder, that man must be killed.
2. If a man commits a robbery, he will be killed.
3. If a man commits a kidnapping, he is to be imprisoned and pay 15 shekels of silver.
4. If a slave marries a slave, and that slave is set free, he does not leave the household. (Note: A slave who has married (and presumably will soon have children) cannot be set free and forced to leave the household so that the owner can save themselves the expense of supporting the slave's family. Slaves needed the consent of their masters to marry, so this ensured they were not just turned out: even if they were now a freedman, they were still members of the household and they and their family had to be supported by it.)
5. If a slave marries a native [i.e. free] person, he/she is to hand the firstborn son over to his owner.
6. If a man violates the right of another and deflowers the virgin wife of a young man, they shall kill that male.
7. If the wife of a man followed after another man and he slept with her, they shall slay that woman, but that male shall be set free. [§4 in some translations]
8. If a man proceeded by force, and deflowered the virgin female slave of another man, that man must pay five shekels of silver. (5)
9. If a man divorces his first-time wife, he shall pay (her) one mina of silver. (6)
10. If it is a (former) widow whom he divorces, he shall pay (her) half a mina of silver. (7)
11. If the man had slept with the widow without there having been any marriage contract, he need not pay any silver. (8)
13. If a man is accused of sorcery [translation disputed], he must undergo ordeal by water; if he is proven innocent, his accuser must pay 3 shekels. (10) (Note: Differing interpretations of this trial avail in Finkelstein 1968, Yildiz 1981 and Sauren 1990.)
14. If a man accused the wife of a man of adultery, and the river ordeal proved her innocent, then the man who had accused her must pay one-third of a mina of silver. (11)
15. If a prospective son-in-law enters the house of his prospective father-in-law, but his father-in-law later gives his daughter to another man, the father-in-law shall return to the rejected son-in-law twofold the amount of bridal presents he had brought. (12)
16. If [text destroyed], he shall weigh and deliver to him 2 shekels of silver.
17. If a slave escapes from the city limits, and someone returns him, the owner shall pay two shekels to the one who returned him. (14)
18. If a man knocks out the eye of another man, he shall weigh out half a mina of silver. (15)
19. If a man has cut off another man's foot, he is to pay ten shekels. (16)
20. If a man, in the course of a scuffle, smashed the limb of another man with a club, he shall pay one mina of silver. (17)
21. If someone severed the nose of another man with a copper knife, he must pay two-thirds of a mina of silver. (18)
22. If a man knocks out a tooth of another man, he shall pay two shekels of silver. (19)
24. [text destroyed] If he does not have a slave, he is to pay 10 shekels of silver. If he does not have silver, he is to give another thing that belongs to him. (21) (Note: This presumably relates to a freeman killing another man's slave, as a slave is the preferred fine above a simple payment in silver, building on the trend in laws 31 and 32 for payment in kind for certain offences. The fact that the fine in silver is equivalent to cutting off a free man's foot also seems to suggest this.)
25. If a man's slave-woman, comparing herself to her mistress, speaks insolently to her, her mouth shall be scoured with 1 quart of salt. (22)
26. If a slave woman strikes someone acting with the authority of her mistress, [text destroyed]
28. If a man appeared as a witness, and was shown to be a perjurer, he must pay fifteen shekels of silver. (25)
29. If a man appears as a witness, but withdraws his oath, he must make payment, to the extent of the value in litigation of the case. (26)
30. If a man stealthily cultivates the field of another man and he raises a complaint, this is however to be rejected, and this man will lose his expenses. (27)
31. If a man flooded the field of a man with water, he shall measure out three kur of barley per iku of field. (28)
32. If a man had let an arable field to a(nother) man for cultivation, but he did not cultivate it, turning it into wasteland, he shall measure out three kur of barley per iku of field. (29)

== See also ==
- Cuneiform law
- Code of Hammurabi
- List of ancient legal codes
- List of inscriptions in biblical archaeology
- Ancient Mesopotamian units of measurement
