= Repudiation (marriage) =

Act by which a husband renounces his wife in certain cultures and religions

Repudiation is a formal or informal action in which a husband leaves his wife in a certain culture and religions. For example:

- In Islam, a talaq divorce allows a man to divorce his spouse (in Arabic, talaq), otherwise known as the formula of repudiation.
- In Babylonian law a husband could repudiate his wife, at the cost of returning the dowry.
- Repudiation is also a concept that existed in the Roman law.
- In India, Section 13(2)(iv) of the Hindu Marriage Act and Section 2(vii) of the Dissolution of Muslim Marriages Act, 1939 gave young wives the option, within time limits, while Section 3(3) of the Prohibition of Child Marriage Act, 2006 gave both husbands and wives the choice, as well as a little more time to exercise it. Inconsistencies in the law are an issue in repudiation of marriage due to different age requirements.

== See also ==
- Divorce
- Category:Repudiated queens
