= Ahaziah =

Ahaziah (Hebrew: אֲחַזְיָהוּ, "held by Yah(-weh)"; Douay–Rheims: Ochozias) was the name of two kings mentioned in the Hebrew Bible:

- Ahaziah of Israel
- Ahaziah of Judah
