= Code of Lipit-Ishtar =

Collection of laws promulgated by Lipit-Ishtar

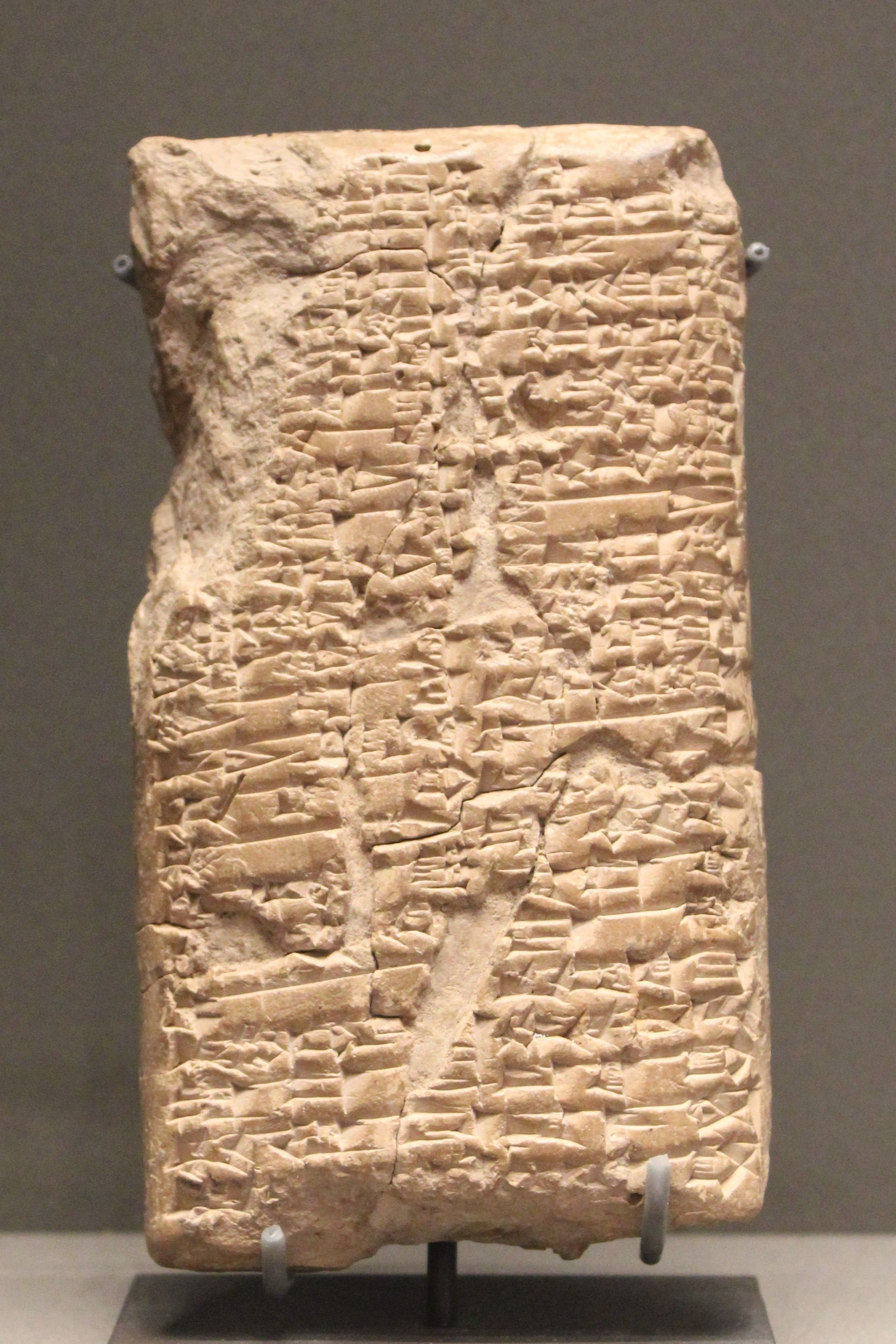
- Prologue to the Code of Lipit-Ishtar (housed in the Louvre [AO 5473])
- Author(s): Lipit-Ishtar

The Code of Lipit-Ishtar is a collection of laws promulgated by Lipit-Ishtar (r. 1934 – 1924 BCE (MC)), a ruler in Lower Mesopotamia. As cuneiform law, it is a legal code written in cuneiform script in the Sumerian language.

It is the second-oldest known extant legal code after the Code of Ur-Nammu. As it is more detailed than that earlier code, it paved the way for the famous later Code of Hammurabi.

== History ==
=== Historical background ===
Lipit-Ishtar (r. 1934 – 1924 BCE (MC)) was the fifth king of the Dynasty of Isin, which was founded after the collapse of the Third Dynasty of Ur. His father, Ishme-Dagan, is credited with the restoration of Nippur, an ancient Sumerian city located in today's Iraq. The Dynasty of Isin governed the city of Isin, also located in today's Iraq, and held political power in the cities of Lower Mesopotamia.

Lipit-Ishtar himself is said to have restored peace and is praised for the establishment of a functioning legal system.

=== Original stele ===
The original diorite stele inscribed with the code was placed in Nippur. Two pieces of this stele have survived to this day. The American academic Martha Roth notes that during this period a tradition existed to name individual years after notable events that happened in that year and argues that one named year could commemorate the erection of the stele. In its English translation, the year is named as follows:

The year in which Lipit-Ishtar established justice in the lands of Sumer and Akkad.

— Lipit-Ishtar (translated by Martha Roth)

=== Transmission ===
The code has been handed down to the present day through various sources. All but two of them stem from Nippur. About half of the code is contained in these sources and thus transmitted. The total length the code is considered to be about the same as that of the later Code of Hammurabi.

== Legal contents ==
The Code of Lipit-Ishtar is similar in structure to the Code of Ur-Nammu, the oldest surviving law code. It has a prologue, which justifies its legal authority, a main body which contains the civil and penal laws governing life and a concluding epilogue.

=== Prologue ===
The prologue legitimatizes the legal content of the code. The gods An and Enlil are invoked and it is explained that they have invested Lipit-Ishtar as "the country’s prince" in order to "establish justice in the land, eradicate the cry for justice [...] [and] forcefully restrain crime and violence" so "that Sumer and Akkad [can] be happy". The prologue further informs the reader that Lipit-Ishtar has recently freed slaves from Nippur, Ur, and Isin.

The academic Martha Roth summarizes the prologue as containing self-praise of Lipit-Ishtar, listing all Lower Mesopotamian cities under his rule, and emphasizing his success as a restorer of justice.

=== Laws ===
The existing main body consists of almost fifty legal provisions. The first set of them deals with boats. They are followed by provisions on agriculture, fugitive slaves, false testimony, foster care, apprenticeship, marriage and sexual relationships as well as rented oxen. The provisions are all introduced by the Sumerian tukun-be, meaning "if". The transmitted provisions do not contain crimes which are punished by death.

The code contains, for example, a provision according to which false accusers have to bear the punishment for the crimes they have alleged. All extant provisions of the code are listed by Martha Roth and Claus Wilcke.

=== Epilogue ===
The epilogue of the code contains three large lacunae. The remaining parts explain that Lipit-Ishtar executed a divine order and brought justice to his land:

I, Lipit-Ishtar […] silenced crime and violence, made tears, laments and cries for justice taboo, let probity and law shine, made Sumer and Akkad content.

— Lipit-Ishtar (translated by Claus Wilcke)

Furthermore, the erection of the stele is reported upon, and blessings are said to those who honour the stele and curses inflicted upon those who would venture to desecrate or destroy it.

== Critical edition and modern translations ==
No modern critical edition of the code exists. Its last English translation was performed by Martha Roth in 1995. The German academic Claus Wilcke translated it into German in 2014.
