= Babylonian law =

Subset of cuneiform law

Babylonian law is a subset of cuneiform law that has received particular study due to the large amount of archaeological material that has been found for it. So-called "contracts" exist in the thousands, including a great variety of deeds, conveyances, bonds, receipts, accounts, and most important of all, actual legal decisions given by the judges in the law courts. Historical inscriptions, royal charters and rescripts, dispatches, private letters and the general literature afford welcome supplementary information. Even grammatical and lexicographical texts contain many extracts or short sentences bearing on law and custom. The so-called "Sumerian Family Laws" are preserved in this way.

Other cultures involved with ancient Mesopotamia shared the same common laws and precedents extending to the form of contracts that Kenneth Kitchen has studied and compared to the form of contracts in the Bible with particular note to the sequence of blessings and curses that bind the deal. The Maxims of Ptahhotep and Sharia Law, also include certifications for professionals like doctors, lawyers and skilled craftsmen which prescribe penalties for malpractice very similar to the code of Hammurabi.

The discovery of the now-celebrated Code of Hammurabi (hereinafter simply termed "the Code") has made possible a more systematic study than could have resulted from just the classification and interpretation of other material. Fragments of other Ancient codes exist and have been published, but there still remain many points whereof evidence is still lacking. There survive legal texts from the earliest writings through the Hellenistic period, but evidence on a particular point may be very full for one period and almost entirely lacking for another. The Code forms the backbone of most reconstructions. Fragments of it recovered from Assur-bani-pal's library at Nineveh and later Babylonian copies show that it was studied, divided into chapters, entitled Ninu ilu sirum from its incipit (opening words), and recopied for fifteen hundred years or more.

Much Babylonian legal precedent remained in force, even through the Persian, Greek and Parthian conquests, which had little effect on private life in Babylonia; and it survived to influence Romans. The laws and customs that preceded the Code may be called "early"; that of the Neo-Babylonian empire (as well as the Persian, Greek, etc.), "late". The law of Assyria was derived from the Babylonian, but it conserved early features long after they had disappeared elsewhere.

== History ==
=== Tribal influence ===
The early history of Mesopotamia is the story of a struggle for supremacy between the cities. A metropolis demanded tribute and military support from its subject cities but left their local cults and customs unaffected. City rights and usages were respected by kings and conquerors alike. When the ancient Semitic-speaking peoples settled in the cities of Mesopotamia, their tribal customs passed over into city law.

As late as the accession of Assur-bani-pal and Shamash-shum-ukin, we find the Babylonians appending to their city laws that groups of aliens to the number of twenty at a time were free to enter the city; that foreign women, once married to Babylonian husbands, could not be enslaved; and that not even a dog that entered the city could be put to death untried.

The population of Babylonia was multi-ethnic from early times, and intercommunication between the cities was incessant. Every city had a large number of resident aliens. This freedom of intercourse must have tended to assimilate custom. It was, however, reserved for the genius of Hammurabi to make Babylon his metropolis and weld together his vast empire by a uniform system of law.

=== Hammurabi's Code ===
By Hammurabi's time, almost all trace of tribal custom had already disappeared from the law of the Code. It is state law—self-help, blood-feud, and marriage by capture, are all absent; though code of family solidarity, district responsibility, ordeal, and the lex talionis (an eye for an eye), are primitive features that remain. The king is a benevolent autocrat, easily accessible to all his subjects, both able and willing to protect the weak against the highest-placed oppressor. The royal power, however, can only pardon when private resentment is appeased. Judges are strictly supervised, and appeal is allowed. The whole land is covered with feudal holdings, masters of the levy, police, etc. There is a regular postal system. The pax Babylonica is so assured that private individuals do not hesitate to ride in their carriage from Babylon to the coast of the Mediterranean. The position of women is free and dignified.

The Code did not merely embody contemporary custom or conserve ancient law. It is true that centuries of law-abiding and litigious habitude had accumulated, in the temple archives of each city, vast stores of precedent in ancient deeds and records of judicial decisions and that intercourse had assimilated city custom. The universal habit of writing, and perpetual recourse to written contract, further modified primitive custom and ancient precedent.

If the parties themselves could agree to the terms, the Code as a rule left them free to make contracts. Their deed of agreement was drawn up in the temple by a notary public and confirmed with an oath "by god and the king." It was publicly sealed and witnessed by professional witnesses, as well as by collaterally interested parties. The manner in which it was executed may have been sufficient guarantee that its stipulations were not impious or illegal. Custom or public opinion doubtlessly ensured that the parties would not agree to "wrong". If a dispute arose, the judges dealt first with the contract. They might not sustain it, but if the parties did not dispute it, they were free to observe it. The judges' decision might, however, be appealed. Many contracts contain the proviso that in case of future dispute, the parties would abide by "the decision of the king." The Code made known, in a vast number of cases, what that decision would be, and many cases of appeal to the king were returned to the judges with orders to decide in accordance with it. The Code itself was carefully and logically arranged, its sections arranged by subject matter. Nevertheless, the order is not that of modern scientific treatises, so a somewhat different order than either is most convenient for our purpose.

See also: English translation of Hammurabi's Code

== Three classes ==
The Code contemplates the whole population as falling into three classes: the avilum, the mushkenu and the ardu.

The avilum was originally a patrician, a man from an elite family, possessed of full civil rights, whose birth, marriage and death were registered. He had aristocratic privileges and responsibilities, and the right to exact retaliation for corporal injuries, but was liable to a heavier punishment for crimes and misdemeanours, higher fees and fines. To this class belonged the king and court, the higher officials, the professions and craftsmen. Over time, the term became a mere courtesy title—already in the Code, when status is not concerned, it is used to denote anyone. There was no property qualification, nor does the term appear to be racial.

It is most difficult to characterize the mushkenu exactly. The term in time came to mean "a beggar", and that meaning has passed through Aramaic and Hebrew into many modern languages; but though the Code does not regard him as necessarily poor, he may have been landless. He was free but had to accept monetary compensation for corporal injuries, paid smaller fees and fines, and even paid less offerings to the gods. He inhabited a separate quarter of the city. There is no reason to regard him as specially connected with the court, as a royal pensioner, nor as forming the bulk of the population. The rarity of any references to him in contemporary documents makes further specification conjectural.

The ardu was a slave, his master's chattel, and formed a very numerous class. He could acquire property and even own other slaves. His master clothed and fed him and paid his doctor's fees, but took all compensation paid for injury done to him. His master usually found him a slave girl for a wife (the children were then born slaves), often set him up in a house (with farm or business) and simply took an annual rent of him. Otherwise, he might marry a free woman (the children were then free), who might bring him a dower that his master could not touch, and at his death, one-half of his property passed to his master as his heir. He could acquire his freedom by purchase from his master, or might be freed and dedicated to a temple, or even adopted, when he became an amelu and not a mushkenu. Slaves were recruited by purchase abroad, from captives taken in war, or by freemen degraded for debt or crime. A slave often ran away; if caught, the captor was bound to restore him to his master, and the Code fixes a reward of two shekels that the owner must pay the captor. It was about one-tenth of the average value of a slave. To detain or harbour a slave was punishable by death. So was aiding him to escape the city gates. A slave bore an identification mark, removable only by a surgical operation, that later consisted of his owner's name tattooed or branded on the arm. On the other hand, on the great estates in Assyria and its subject provinces there were many serfs, mostly of subject race, settled captives, or quondam slaves; tied to the soil they cultivated and sold with the estate, yet capable of possessing land and property of their own. There is little trace of serfs in Babylonia, unless the mushkenu is really a serf.

== Citizens tenants of gods ==
The god of a city was originally considered the owner of its land, which encircled it with an inner ring of irrigable arable land and an outer fringe of pasture; the citizens were his tenants. The god and his vice regent, the king, had long ceased to disturb tenancy and were content with fixed dues in naturalia, stock, money or service.

One of the earliest monuments records the purchase by a king of a large estate for his son, paying a fair market price and adding a handsome honorarium to the many owners, in costly garments, plate, and precious articles of furniture. The Code recognizes complete private ownership of land but apparently extends the right to hold land to votaries and merchants; but all land sold was subject to its fixed charges. The king, however, could free land from these charges by charter, which was a frequent way of rewarding those who deserved well of the state.

It is from these charters that we learn of the obligations lying upon land. The state demanded men for the army and the corvée, as well as dues in kind. A certain area was bound to provide a bowman, together with his linked pikeman (who bore the shield for both), and to furnish them with supplies for the campaign. This area was termed a "bow" as early as the 8th century BC, but the practice goes back much earlier. Later, a horseman was also due from certain areas. A man was only bound to serve a certain number of times, but the land still had to find a man annually. This service was usually discharged by slaves and serfs, but the amelu (and perhaps the mushkenu) also went to war. The bows were grouped together in tens and hundreds. The corvée was less regular. Special liabilities also lay upon riparian owners to repair canals, bridges, quays, etc. The letters of Hammurabi often deal with claims to exemption. Religious officials and shepherds in charge of flocks were exempt from military duty.

The state claimed certain proportions of all crops, stock, etc. The king's messengers could commandeer any subject's property, giving a receipt. Further, every city had its own octroi duties, customs, ferry dues, highway and water rates. The king had long ceased to be owner of the land, if he ever was. He had his own royal estates, his private property, and dues from all his subjects. The higher officials had endowments and official residences.

The Code regulates the feudal position of certain classes. They held an estate from the king, consisting of a house, a garden, a field, stock, and a salary, on condition of personal service on the king's errand. They could not delegate the service, on penalty of death. When ordered abroad, they could nominate a capable son to hold the benefice and carry on the duty. If there was no capable son, the state put in a locum tenens but granted one-third to the wife to maintain herself and her children. The fief was otherwise inalienable; it could not be sold, pledged, exchanged, sublet, devised or diminished. Other land was leased from the state. Ancestral estate was strictly tied to the family. If a holder would sell, the family kept the right of redemption, and there seems to have been no time limit to its exercise.

== Temple ==
The temple occupied a most important position. It received income from its estates, from tithes and other fixed dues, as well as from the sacrifices (a customary share) and other offerings of the faithful—vast amounts of all sorts of naturalia, besides money and permanent gifts. The larger temples had many officials and servants.

Originally, perhaps, each town clustered round one temple, and each head of family had a right to minister there and share its receipts. As the city grew, the right to so many days a year at one shrine (or its gate) descended within certain families and became a kind of property that could be pledged, rented or shared within the family, but not alienated. Despite all these demands, the temples became great granaries and storehouses and were also the city archives. The temple had its responsibilities. If a citizen was captured by the enemy and could not ransom himself, the temple of his city must do so. To the temple came the poor farmer to borrow seed, grain, or supplies for harvesters, etc.—advances that he repaid without interest.

The king's power over the temple was not proprietary, but administrative. He might borrow from it, but repaid like other borrowers. The tithe seems to have been considered the rent due to the god for his land. It is not clear that all lands paid tithe; perhaps only such as once had a special connection with the temple.

The Code deals with a class of persons devoted to the service of a god, as vestals or hierodules. The vestals were vowed to chastity, lived together in a great nunnery, were forbidden to enter a tavern, and, together with other votaries, had many privileges.

== Property law ==
The Code recognizes many ways of disposing of property: sale, lease, barter, gift, dedication, deposit, loan, or pledge, all of which were matters of contract. Sale was the delivery of a purchase (in the case of real estate, symbolized by a staff, a key, or deed of conveyance) in return for purchase money, receipts being given for both. Credit, if given, was treated as a debt, and secured as a loan by the seller to be repaid by the buyer, for which he gave a bond.

The Code only allows claims substantiated by documents, or in some cases the oath of witnesses. Saving contracts and receipts thus assumed a vital importance in Babylon - in fact it could literally be a matter of life or death. A buyer had to be sure of the seller's title. If he bought (or received on deposit) property from even a minor or a slave without witnessing contracts, he would be executed as a thief (§7). If purchased goods were stolen and the rightful owner reclaimed them, he had to prove his purchase by producing the seller and the deed of sale, or witnesses to it; otherwise, he would be adjudged a thief and die. If he proved his purchase, he had to give up the property but could pursue a remedy against the seller or, if the seller had died, could reclaim fivefold from his estate.

A man who bought a slave abroad might find that he had previously been stolen or captured from Babylonia; he would then have to restore him to his former owner without recompense. If he bought property belonging to a feudal holding, or to a ward in Chancery, he had to return it as well as forfeit what he paid for it. He could repudiate the purchase of a slave attacked by the bennu sickness within a month (later, a hundred days) and could hold a newly purchased female slave for three days "on approval". A defect of title, or an undisclosed liability, would invalidate a sale at any time.

== Leasing ==
Landowners frequently cultivated their land themselves, but could also employ a husbandman, or rent it. The husbandman was bound to carry out proper cultivation, raise an average crop, and leave the field in good tilth. In case the crop failed, the Code fixed a statutory return. Land might be leased at a fixed rent, where the Code stipulates that accidental loss fell on the tenant. If leased on profit-sharing terms, the landlord and tenant shared the loss proportionally to their stipulated share of profit. If the tenant paid his rent and kept the land in good tilth, the landlord could not interfere nor forbid subletting.

Wasteland could be leased for reclamation, the tenant being rent-free for three years and paying a stipulated rent in the fourth year. If the tenant neglected to reclaim the land, the Code stipulated that he must hand it over in good tilth and set a statutory rent. Gardens or plantations were leased in the same ways and under the same conditions; but for date groves, four years' free tenure was allowed.

The metayer system was common, especially on temple lands. The landlord found land, labour, oxen for ploughing and working the watering machines, carting, threshing or other implements, grain seed, rations for the workmen and fodder for the cattle. The tenant, or steward, usually had other land of his own. If he stole the seed, rations or fodder, the Code stipulated that his fingers be cut off. If he appropriated or sold the implements, or impoverished or sublet the cattle, he was heavily fined and in default of payment, might be condemned to be torn to pieces by the cattle on the field. Rent was determined by contract.

Irrigation was essential for farming in this region. If the irrigator neglected to repair his dike or left his runnel open and caused a flood, he had to make good the damage done to his neighbours' crops or be sold with his family to pay the cost. The theft of a watering machine, water-bucket or other agricultural implement was heavily fined.

Houses were usually leased for the year, but also for longer terms, rent being paid in advance, half-yearly. The contract generally specified that the house be in good repair, and the tenant was bound to keep it so. The woodwork, including doors and door frames, was removable, and the tenant might bring and take away his own. The Code stipulated that if the landlord re-entered before the term was up, he must remit a fair proportion of the rent. Land could be leased for the purpose of building houses or other buildings on it, the tenant being rent-free for eight or ten years; after which the building came into the landlord's possession.

== Hired labour ==
Despite the multitude of slaves, hired labour was often needed, especially at harvest. This was a matter of contract, and the employer, who usually paid in advance, might demand a collateral against fulfillment of the work. Cattle were hired for ploughing, working the watering machines, carting, threshing, etc. The Code fixed a statutory wage for sowers, ox-drivers, field-labourers, and hire for oxen, asses, etc.

There were many herds and flocks. The flocks were committed to a shepherd, who gave receipt for them and took them out to pasture. The Code fixed his wage. He was responsible for all care, must restore ox for ox, sheep for sheep and must breed them satisfactorily. Any dishonest use of the flock had to be repaid tenfold, but loss due to disease or wild beasts fell upon the owner. The shepherd made good all loss due to his own neglect. If he let the flock feed on a field of crops, he had to pay damages fourfold; if he turned them into standing crops when they ought to have been folded, he paid twelvefold.

== Debt ==
In commerce, payment in kind was still common, though contracts usually stipulated cash, naming the currency expected—that of Babylon, Larsa, Assyria, Carchemish, etc. The Code stipulated, however, that a debtor must be allowed to pay in produce according to a statutory scale. If a debtor had neither money nor crops, the creditor must not refuse goods.

Debt was secured on the debtor's own person. Distraint on a debtor's grain was forbidden by the Code; not only must the creditor return it, but his illegal action forfeited his claim altogether. An unwarranted seizure for debt was fined, as was the distraint of a working ox.

If a debtor were seized for debt, he could nominate as mancipium, or hostage to work off the debt, his wife, child, or slave. The creditor could only hold a wife or child three years as mancipium. If the mancipium died a natural death while in the creditor's possession, no claim could lie against the latter; but if he was the cause of death by cruelty, he had to give son for son, or pay for a slave. He could sell a slave-hostage, but not a slave-girl who had borne her master children; she had to be redeemed by her owner.

The debtor could also pledge his property and in contracts, often pledged a field, house or crop. The Code stipulated, however, that the debtor must take the crop himself and pay the creditor from its yield. If the crop failed, payment was deferred, and no interest could be charged for that year. If the debtor did not cultivate the field himself, he had to pay for its cultivation, but if the field was already cultivated, he must harvest it himself and pay his debt from the crop. If the cultivator did not get a crop, this would not cancel his contract.

Pledges were often made where the intrinsic value of the article was equivalent to the amount of the debt; but antichretic pledge was more common, where the profit of the pledge was a set-off against the interest of the debt. The whole property of a debtor might be pledged as collateral for payment of a debt, without any of it passing through the hands of the creditor. Personal guarantees were often given in Babylon that the debtor would repay, or the guarantor become liable himself.

== Trade ==
Trade was very extensive. A common procedure was for a merchant to entrust his goods or money to a traveling agent, who sought a market for his goods. The caravans travelled far beyond the limits of the empire.

The Code insisted that the agent should inventory and give a receipt for all that he received. No claim could be made for anything not so entered. Even if the agent made no profit, he was bound to return double what he had received; if he made poor profit, he had to make up the deficiency; but he was not responsible for loss by robbery or extortion on his travels. On his return, the lending merchant must give him a receipt for what was handed over to him. Any false entry or claim on the agent's part was penalised threefold; on the lending merchant's part, sixfold. In normal cases, profits were divided according to contract, usually equally.

A considerable amount of forwarding (advancing wares to the agent up front) was done by the caravans. The carrier gave a receipt for the consignment, took all responsibility, and exacted a receipt upon delivery. If he defaulted, he paid fivefold. He was usually paid in advance. Deposit, especially warehousing of grain, was charged for at one-sixtieth. The warehouse man took all risks and paid double for all shortage, but no claim could be made unless he had given a properly witnessed receipt.

Water traffic on the Euphrates and canal system was early on, quite considerable. Ships, whose tonnage was estimated by the amount of grain they could carry, were continually hired for the transport of all kinds of goods. The Code fixes the price for shipbuilding and insists on the builder's giving a year's guarantee of seaworthiness. It also fixes the rate of hire for ship and crew. The captain was responsible for the freight and the ship; he had to replace all loss. Even if he refloated the ship, he had to pay a fine of half its value for sinking it. In the case of collision, the boat under way was responsible for damages to the boat at anchor.

The Code also regulated the liquor traffic—fixing a fair price for beer and forbidding the connivance of the tavern keeper (a female) at disorderly conduct or treasonable assembly, under pain of death. She was required to take the offenders to the palace—implying an efficient and accessible police system.

Payment through a banker or by written draft against deposit was frequent. Bonds to pay were treated as negotiable. Interest was rarely charged on advances by the temple or wealthy landowners for pressing needs, but this may have been part of the metayer system. The borrowers may have been tenants. Interest was charged at very high rates for overdue loans of this kind. Merchants (and even temples in some cases) made ordinary business loans, charging from 20% to 30%.

== Family law ==
=== Marriage ===
Marriage retained the form of purchase, but was essentially a contract to be husband and wife together. The marriage of young people was usually arranged between their relatives—the groom's father the bride-price, which, with other gifts, the suitor ceremonially presented to the bride's father. This bride-price was usually then handed over by her father to the bride upon her marriage, and so returned into the bridegroom's possession, along with her dowry, which was her portion of the family's inheritance as a daughter.

The bride-price varied greatly, according to the status of the parties, but surpassed the price of a slave. The Code stipulated that if the father did not give the suitor his daughter after accepting the suitor's gifts, he must return the gifts. The bride-price had to be returned even if the father reneged on the marriage contract because of slander of the suitor on the part of the suitor's friend, and the Code stipulated that the slanderer should not marry the girl (and thus would not profit from his slander). Conversely, if a suitor changed his mind, he forfeited the presents.

The dowry might include real estate, but generally consisted of personal effects and household furniture. It remained the wife's for life, descending to her children, if any; otherwise returning to her family, when the husband could deduct the bride-price if it had not been given to her, or return it if it had.

The marriage ceremony included joining hands and the bridegroom uttering a formula of acceptance, such as, "I am the son of nobles, silver and gold shall fill thy lap, thou shalt be my wife, I will be thy husband. Like the fruit of a garden I will give thee offspring." The ceremony must be performed by a freeman.

The marriage contract—without which, the Code ruled that the woman was no wife—usually stated the consequences to which each party was liable for repudiating the other. These by no means necessarily agree with the Code. Many other conditions might also be inserted: such as that the wife should act as maidservant to her mother-in-law or to a first wife.

The married couple formed a single unit in terms of external responsibility, especially for debt. The man was responsible for debts contracted by his wife, even before her marriage, as well as for his own; but he could use her as a mancipium (see above). Hence the Code allowed a proviso to be inserted in the marriage contract, that the wife should not be seized for her husband's pre-nuptial debts; but stipulated that then he was not responsible for her pre-nuptial debts, and, in any case, that both together were responsible for all debts contracted after marriage. A man might make his wife a settlement by deed of gift, which gave her a life interest in part of his property, and he might reserve to her the right to bequeath it to a favorite child; but she could in no case leave it to her family. Although married, she always remained a member of her father's house—she is rarely named wife of A, but usually daughter of B, or mother of C.

=== Divorce ===
Divorce was the husband's option, but he had to restore the dowry, and if the wife had borne him children, she had custody of them. He then had to assign her the income from property, as well as goods to maintain herself and their children until they grew up. She shared equally with their children in the allowance (and apparently in his estate at his death) and was free to marry again. If she had no children, he returned her dowry to her and paid her a sum equivalent to the bride-price, or a mina of silver if there had been none. The latter is the forfeit usually named in the contract for his repudiation of her.

If the husband could show that his wife had been a bad wife, the Code allowed him to send her away, while he kept the children as well as her dowry; or he could degrade her to the position of a slave in his own house, where she would have food and clothing. The wife might bring an action against her husband for cruelty and neglect and, if she proved her case, obtain a judicial separation, taking her dowry with her. No other punishment fell on the man. If she did not prove her case, but was proved to be a bad wife, she was drowned.

If the wife was left without maintenance during an involuntary absence of her husband (called to war, etc.), she could cohabit with another man, but must return to her husband when he came back, the children of the second union remaining with their own father. If she had maintenance, a breach of the marriage tie was adultery. Willful desertion by, or exile of, the husband dissolved the marriage without penalty to the wife. If he returned, she was not required or even permitted to return to him.

=== Widowhood ===
A widow took her husband's place in the family—living in his house and bringing up the children. She could only remarry with judicial consent, where the judge inventoried the deceased's estate and handed it over to her and her new husband in trust for the children. They could not alienate a single utensil.

If she did not remarry, she lived on in her husband's house and, when the children had grown up, took a child's share in the division of his estate. She retained her dowry and any settlement deeded to her by her husband. This property would come down to her children on her death. If she had remarried, all her children would share equally in her dowry, but the first husband's estate fell only to his children, or to her selection among them, if so empowered.

=== Childbearing ===
Monogamy was the rule, and a childless wife might give her husband a maid to bear him children, who were then reckoned hers. She remained mistress of her maid, and might degrade her to slavery again for insolence, but could not sell her if she had borne her husband children. If the wife did this, the Code did not allow the husband to take a concubine; but if she did not, he could do so. The concubine was a co-wife, though not of the same rank; the first wife had no power over her. A concubine was a free woman, often dowered for marriage, and her children were legitimate and lawful heirs. She could only be divorced on the same conditions as a wife.

If a wife became a chronic invalid, the husband was bound to maintain her in the home they had made together, unless she preferred to take her dowry and return to her father's house; but he was free to remarry. Again, the children of the new wife were legitimate and lawful heirs.

There was no hindrance to a man having children by a slave girl. These children were free, and their mother then could not be sold, though she might be pledged, and she became free upon her master's death. Her children could be legitimized by their father's acknowledgment before witnesses and were often adopted. They then ranked equally in sharing their father's estate; but if not adopted, the wife's children divided and took first choice.

Temple priests were not supposed to have children, yet they could marry and often did. The Code contemplated that such a wife would give a husband a maid, as above.

Free women might marry slaves and still be dowered for the marriage. The children were free, and at the slave's death, the wife took her dowry and half of what she and her husband had acquired in wedlock for self and children; the master taking the other half, as his slave's heir.

A father had control over his children until their marriage. He had a right to their labor in return for their keep. He might hire them out and receive their wages, pledge them for debt, or even sell them outright. Mothers had the same rights in the absence of the father; elder brothers, when both parents were dead. A father had no claim on his married children for support, but they retained the right to inherit on his death.

The daughter was not only in her father's power to be given in marriage, but he might dedicate her to the service of a god as a vestal or a hierodule or give her as a concubine. She had no choice in these matters, often decided in her childhood. An adult daughter might wish to become a votary, perhaps in preference to an uncongenial marriage, and it seems that her father could not refuse her wish.

In all these cases, the father might dower her. If he did not, on his death the brothers were obligated to do so, giving her a full child's share if a wife, a concubine or a vestal, but one-third of a child's share if she were a hierodule or a Marduk priestess. The latter had the privilege of exemption from state dues and absolute disposal of her property. All other daughters had only a life interest in their dowry, which reverted to their family if childless or went to their children if they had any. A father might, however, execute a deed granting a daughter power to leave her property to a favorite brother or sister.

A daughter's estate was usually managed for her by her brothers, but if they dissatisfied her, she could appoint a steward. If she married, her husband then managed it. Sons also appear to have received their share on marriage, but then did not always leave their father's house; they might bring their wives there. This was usual in child marriages.

=== Adoption ===
Adoption was very common, especially when the father (or mother) was childless or had seen all his children grow up and marry away. The child was then adopted to care for the parents' old age. This was done by contract, which usually specified what the parent had to leave and what maintenance was expected. The natural children, if any, were usually consenting parties to an arrangement that cut off their expectations. In some cases they even acquired the estate for the adopted child who was to relieve them of care. If the adopted child failed to carry out the filial duty, the contract was annulled in the law courts. Slaves were often adopted, and if they proved unfilial, were reduced to slavery again.

A craftsman often adopted a son to learn the craft. He profited by the son's labour. If he failed to teach his son the craft, that son could prosecute him and get the contract annulled. This was a form of apprenticeship, and it is not clear whether the apprentice had any filial relation.

A man who had adopted a child, and afterwards married and had a family of his own, could dissolve the contract and must give the adopted child one-third of a child's share in goods, but no real estate. Property could only descend through his legitimate family. Vestals frequently adopted daughters, usually other vestals, to care for them in their old age.

Adoption had to be with consent of the natural parents, who usually executed a deed making over the child, who thus ceased to have any claim upon them. But vestals, hierodules, certain palace officials and slaves had no rights over their children and could raise no objection. Orphans and illegitimate children had no parents to object. Ingratitude by adopted children was severely frowned on by the law: if the adopted child of a prostitute abandoned his foster parents and returned to his biological father's house, his eye was torn out. If an adopted child rejected his foster parents, claiming they were not his mother and father, his tongue was torn out. An adopted child was a full heir; the contract might even assign him the position of eldest son. Usually, he was residuary legatee.

=== Inheritance ===
All legitimate children shared equally in the father's estate on his death, reservation being made of a bride-price for an unmarried son, dower for a daughter, or property deeded to favourite children by the father. There was no birthright attaching to the position of eldest son, but he usually acted as executor and, after considering what each had already received, equalized the shares. He even made grants in excess to the others from his own share. If there were two widows with legitimate issue, both families shared equally in the father's estate, until later times, when the first family took two-thirds. Daughters, in the absence of sons, had sons' rights. Children also shared their own mother's property, but had no share in that of a stepmother.

A father could disinherit a son in early times without restriction, but the Code insisted upon judicial consent, and that only for repeated unfilial conduct. In early times, the son who denied his father had his front hair shorn and a slave-mark put on him and could be sold as a slave; while the son who denied his mother had his front hair shorn, was driven round the city as an example and expelled from his home, but not degraded to slavery.

=== Adultery ===
Adultery was punished with the death of both parties by drowning; but if the husband was willing to pardon his wife, the king might intervene to pardon the paramour. For incest between mother and son, both were burned to death; with a stepmother, the man was disinherited; with a daughter, the man was exiled; with a daughter-in-law, he was drowned; with a son's fiancée, he was fined. A wife who for her lover's sake procured her husband's death was gibbeted. A betrothed girl seduced by her prospective father-in-law took her dowry and returned to her family and was free to marry as she chose.

== Punishment ==
In the criminal code, the ruling vice-principle was the lex talionis. Eye for eye, tooth for tooth, limb for limb was the penalty for assault upon an amelu. A sort of symbolic retaliation was the punishment for the offender, seen in cutting off the hand that struck a father or stole a trust; in cutting off the breast of a wet nurse who switched the child entrusted to her for another; in the loss of the tongue that denied father or mother (in Elamite contracts, the same penalty was inflicted for perjury); in the loss of the eye that pried into forbidden secrets. The loss of the surgeon's hand that caused loss of life or limb, or the brander's hand that obliterated a slave's identification mark, are very similar. The slave who struck a freeman or denied his master lost an ear, the organ of hearing and symbol of obedience. A person who brought another into danger of death by false accusation was punished by death. A perjurer was punished by the same penalty the perjurer sought to bring upon another.

The death penalty was freely rendered for theft and other crimes in this section of the Code: for theft involving entering a palace or temple treasury, for illegal purchase from a minor or slave, for selling stolen goods or receiving the same, for common theft in the open (in lieu of multiple-fold restoration) or receiving the same, for false claim to goods, for kidnapping, for assisting or harbouring fugitive slaves, for detaining or appropriating the same, for brigandage, for fraudulent sale of drink, for not reporting criminal conspiracy in one's tavern, for delegation of personal service and refusing to pay the delegate or not sending the delegate, for misappropriating the levy, for harming or robbing one of the king's captains, for causing the death of a house owner through bad construction. The manner of death is not specified for these cases.

This death penalty was also set for conduct that placed another in danger of death. The form of death penalty was specified for the following cases: gibbeting: for burglary (on the spot where crime was committed), later also for encroaching on the king's highway, for getting a slave-brand obliterated, for procuring a husband's death; burning: for incest with own mother, for a vestal entering or opening a tavern, for looting a house on fire (thrown into the fire); drowning: for adultery, rape of a betrothed maiden, bigamy, bad conduct as a wife, seduction of a daughter-in-law.

A curious extension of the lex talionis is the death of a creditor's son for his father's having caused the death of a debtor's son as mancipium; of a builder's son for his father's causing the death of a house owner's son by bad construction; the death of a man's daughter because her father caused the death of another man's daughter.

Contracts naturally do not usually touch on criminal matters as the above, but marriage contracts do specify death by strangling, drowning, precipitation from a tower or pinnacle of the temple, or by the iron sword, for a wife's repudiation of her husband. We are quite without evidence as to the executioner in all these cases.

Exile was inflicted for incest with a daughter; disinheritance for incest with a stepmother, or for repeated unfilial conduct. Sixty strokes of an ox-hide scourge were awarded for a brutal assault on a superior, both being amelu. Branding (perhaps the equivalent of degradation to slavery) was the penalty for slander of a married woman or vestal. Permanent deprivation of office fell upon the corrupt judge. Enslavement befell the extravagant wife and unfilial children. Imprisonment was common, but is not mentioned in the Code.

The commonest of all penalties was a fine. This is awarded by the Code for corporal injuries to a mushkenu or to a slave (paid to his master), for damages done to property, or for breach of contract. The restoration of goods appropriated, illegally bought, or damaged by neglect, was usually accompanied by a fine, giving it the form of multiple restoration. This might be double, treble, fourfold, fivefold, sixfold, tenfold, twelvefold, or even thirtyfold, according to the enormity of the offence.

The Code recognized the importance of intent. A man who killed another in a quarrel must swear he did not do so intentionally and was then only fined according to the rank of the deceased. The Code does not say what would be the penalty of murder, but death is so often awarded where death is caused, that we can hardly doubt that the murderer was put to death. If the assault only led to injury and was unintentional, the assailant in a quarrel had to pay the doctor's fees. A brander, induced to remove a slave's identification mark, could swear to his ignorance and was free. The owner of an ox that gored a man on the street was only responsible for damages if the ox was known by him to be vicious—even if it caused death. If the mancipium died a natural death under the creditor's hand, the creditor was free. In ordinary cases, a person was not responsible for accident or if they exercised more than proper care. Poverty excused bigamy on the part of a deserted wife.

On the other hand, carelessness and neglect were severely punished, as in the case of the unskillful physician, if it led to loss of life or limb, his hands were cut off; a slave had to be replaced, the loss of his eye paid for by half his value; a veterinary surgeon who caused the death of an ox or donkey paid quarter value; a builder whose careless workmanship caused death died or paid for it by the death of his child, replaced slave or goods and in any case, had to rebuild the house or make good any damages due to defective building and repair the defect as well. The boat builder had to make good any defect of construction or damage due to it for a year's warranty.

Throughout the Code, respect is paid to evidence. Suspicion was not enough. The criminal must be taken in the act, e.g. the adulterer, etc. A man could not be convicted of theft unless the goods were found in his possession.

In the case of a lawsuit, the plaintiff proffered his own plea. There is no trace of professional advocates, but the plea had to be in writing, and the notary doubtlessly assisted in the drafting of it. The judge saw the plea, called the other parties before him, and sent for the witnesses. If these were not at hand, he might adjourn the case for their subpoena, specifying a time for up to six months. Pledges might be made to produce the witnesses on a fixed day.

The more important cases, especially those involving life and death, were tried by a bench of judges. With the judges were associated a body of elders who shared in the decision, but whose exact function is not yet clear. Agreements, declarations and non-contentious cases were usually witnessed by one judge and twelve elders.

Parties and witnesses were put on oath. The penalty for false witness was usually the punishment that would have been awarded the victim if convicted. In matters beyond human knowledge, such as the guilt or innocence of an alleged practitioner of magic or a suspected wife, the ordeal by water was used. The accused jumped into the sacred river, and the innocent swam while the guilty drowned. The accused could clear himself by taking an oath if the only knowledge available was his own. The plaintiff could swear to his loss by brigands, the price paid for a slave purchased abroad, or the sum due to him; but great stress was laid on the production of written evidence. It was a serious thing to lose a document. The judges might be satisfied of its existence and terms by the affidavit of the witnesses to it and then issue an order that whenever found, it should be submitted. The clay tablets of contracts that were annulled were broken. The court might even travel to view the property and take with them the sacred symbols with which oaths were made.

Court decisions were set in writing, sealed and witnessed by the judges, the elders, witnesses, and a scribe. Women might act in all these capacities. The parties swore an oath, included in the document, to observe its stipulations. Each party received a copy, and one was kept by the scribe to be stored in the archives.

Appeal to the king was allowed and is well attested. The judges at Babylon seem to have formed a superior court to those of provincial towns, but a defendant might elect to answer the charge before the local court and refuse to plead at Babylon.

Finally, it may be noted that many immoral acts, such as the use of false weights, lying, etc., that could not be brought into court are severely denounced in the Omen Tablets as likely to bring the offender into "the hand of God" as opposed to "the hand of the king".

== See also ==
- Assyrian law
- Hebraic law
- List of ancient legal codes
