= Ancient literature =

Ancient literature comprises religious and scientific documents, tales, poetry and plays, royal edicts and declarations, and other forms of writing that were recorded on a variety of media, including stone, clay tablets, papyri, palm leaves, and metal. Before the spread of writing, oral literature did not always survive well, but some texts and fragments have persisted. An unknown number of ancient written works have not survived and are therefore lost.

== Incomplete list of ancient texts ==
=== Bronze Age ===
==== Early Bronze Age ====
3rd millennium BC (approximate dates shown). The earliest written literature dates from about 2600 BC (classical Sumerian). Certain literary texts are difficult to date, such as the Egyptian Book of the Dead, which was recorded in the Papyrus of Ani around 1240 BC, but other versions of the book probably date from about the 18th century BC.

- 2600 BC: Sumerian texts from Abu Salabikh, including the Instructions of Shuruppak and the Kesh temple hymn
- 2600 BC: Egyptian The Life of Metjen from Saqqara
- 2500 BC: Egyptian Diary of Merer and Instruction of Hardjedef
- 2500 BC: Sumerian Hymn to Enlil, Enlil and Ninlil, and Debate between sheep and grain
- 2400 BC: Sumerian Code of Urukagina
- 2400 BC – 2300 BC: Egyptian Pyramid Texts, including the Cannibal Hymn
- 2375 BC: Egyptian The Maxims of Ptahhotep
- 2283 BC: Egyptian Palermo Stone
- 2270 BC: Sumerian Enheduanna's Hymns
- 2250 BC: Egyptian Autobiography of Weni and South Saqqara Stone
- 2250 BC – 2000 BC: Earliest Sumerian stories in the Epic of Gilgamesh
- 2200 BC: Egyptian Autobiography of Harkhuf
- 2125 BC: Sumerian Building of Ningirsu's Temple
- 2100 BC: Sumerian Curse of Agade, Debate between bird and fish, Debate between the hoe and the plough, Debate between tree and reed, Debate between silver and copper, Inanna's Descent into the Underworld, Self-praise of Shulgi, Code of Ur-Nammu, and Song of the hoe
- 2084 BC: Sumerian Sumerian King List
- 2050 BC: Egyptian The Satire of the Trades

==== Middle Bronze Age ====
2000 BC to 1601 BC (approximate dates shown)

- 2000 BC: Egyptian Coffin Texts and Teaching for King Merykara
- 2000 BC: Sumerian Lament for Ur, Lament for Sumer and Ur, Enmerkar and the Lord of Aratta, and Debate between Winter and Summer
- 2000 BC – 1900 BC: Egyptian Tale of the Shipwrecked Sailor, Prophecy of Neferti, and the first of the Harper's Songs
- 1950 BC: Akkadian Laws of Eshnunna and Hymn to Ištar
- 1950 BC: Egyptian Instructions of Amenemhat, the Akhmim wooden tablets, and the Heqanakht papyri
- 1940 BC: Sumerian Correspondence of the Kings of Ur
- 1900 BC: Akkadian Legend of Etana, Summa izbu, Šumma ālu, Namburbi, and Iškar Zaqīqu
- 1900 BC: Sumerian Code of Lipit-Ishtar and The Legend of Adapa
- 1900 BC: Egyptian Instructions of Kagemni
- 1859 BC – 1840 BC: Egyptian Dispute between a man and his Ba
- 1859 BC – 1813 BC: Egyptian Loyalist Teaching
- 1850 BC: Egyptian The Eloquent Peasant
- 1850 BC: Akkadian Kultepe texts, Bārûtu, the Counsels of Wisdom, the Cuthean Legend of Naram-Sin, and the Labbu Myth
- 1800 BC: Akkadian earliest complete version of the Epic of Gilgamesh
- 1800 BC: Egyptian Berlin Papyrus 6619, Moscow Mathematical Papyrus, and Story of Sinuhe (in Hieratic)
- 1780 BC: Akkadian Mari letters, including the Epic of Zimri-Lim
- 1754 BC: Akkadian Code of Hammurabi stele
- 1750 BC: Akkadian Agushaya Hymn
- Late 18th century BC: Hittite Anitta text
- 1700 BC: Akkadian Atra-Hasis
- 1700 BC: Egyptian Westcar Papyrus
- 1650 BC: Egyptian Ipuwer Papyrus
- 1650 BC: Sumerian Dialogue between a Man and His God

==== Late Bronze Age ====
1600 BC to 1201 BC (approximate dates shown)

- 1600 BC: Hittite Code of the Nesilim
- 1600 BC: Akkadian Ḫulbazizi, Eridu Genesis and Enuma Anu Enlil
- 1600 BC: Egyptian Edwin Smith Papyrus
- 1550 BC: Egyptian Book of the Dead, Instruction of Any, King Neferkare and General Sasenet, the Tale of the Doomed Prince, the Litany of Re, Rhind Mathematical Papyrus, and the Ebers Papyrus
- 1550 BC: Akkadian Bullussa-rabi's Hymn to Gula
- 1550 BC: Babylonian Venus tablet of Ammisaduqa
- 1500 BC: Akkadian Poor Man of Nippur
- 1500 BC: Hittite military oath
- 1500 BC – 1300 BC: Ugaritic Baal Cycle
- 1500 BC – 1200 BC: Ugaritic Legend of Keret
- 1500 BC – 1000 BC: Sanskrit Rig Veda
- 1500 BC: Akkadian Dynasty of Dunnum and Chronicle of Early Kings
- 1450 BC: Egyptian The Taking of Joppa
- 1450 BC: Akkadian Assyrian law
- 1425 BC: Egyptian Amduat
- 1400 BC: Akkadian Marriage of Nergal and Ereshkigal, Autobiography of Kurigalzu, and Amarna letters
- Mid 14th century BC: Egyptian Great Hymn to the Aten
- 1350 BC: Ugaritic Tale of Aqhat
- 1350 BC: Akkadian Šurpu
- 1300 BC: Egyptian Instruction of Amenemope, Papyrus Anastasi I
- 1300 BC: Akkadian Ludlul bēl nēmeqi, the Dream of Kurigalzu, The Hemerology for Nazi-Maruttaš, Iqqur Ipuš, and Summa izbu
- 1274 BC: Akkadian Adad-nārāri Epic
- 1240 BC: Egyptian Papyrus of Ani, Book of the Dead
- 1200 BC – 900 BC: Akkadian version and younger stories in the Epic of Gilgamesh
- 1200 BC: Akkadian Tukulti-Ninurta Epic
- 1200 BC: Egyptian Tale of Two Brothers

=== Iron Age ===
Iron Age texts predating Classical Antiquity: 12th to 8th centuries BC

- 1200 BC: The Yajurveda, Samaveda, and Atharvaveda
- 1100 BC: Akkadian Šumma sinništu qaqqada rabāt
- 1050 BC: Egyptian Story of Wenamun
- 1050 BC: Akkadian Sakikkū (SA.GIG) "Diagnostic Omens" by Esagil-kin-apli.
- 1050 BC: Akkadian Alamdimmû
- 1050 BC: The Babylonian Theodicy of Šaggil-kīnam-ubbib.
- 1010 BC: Akkadian Royal Inscription of Simbar-Šipak
- 1000 BC: Chinese Classic of Poetry (Shījīng)
- 1000 BC: Akkadian Dialogue of Pessimism, Chronicle P, Maglû, Bīt rimki, Zu-buru-dabbeda, Advice to a Prince, Asakkū marsūtu, the Great Prayer to Šamaš, the MUL.APIN, the Sag-gig-ga-meš, and Šēp lemutti
- 900 BC: Akkadian Epic of Erra
- 900 BC: Vedic Sanskrit Aranyaka

=== Classical antiquity ===
==== 9th century BC ====
- Chinese:
  - Classic of Changes (I Ching)
- Akkadian:
  - Ninurta-Pāqidāt's Dog Bite
  - Enûma Eliš

==== 8th century BC ====
- Greek:
  - Trojan War cycle, including the Iliad and the Odyssey
- Sanskrit:
  - Brahmanas
  - Brihadaranyaka Upanishad
  - Isha Upanishad
  - Chandogya Upanishad
  - Aitareya Upanishad
  - Taittiriya Upanishad
- Akkadian:
  - Chronicle of the Market Prices
  - Hymn to Ninurta as Savior
  - Mîs-pî

==== 7th century BC ====
- Vedic Sanskrit:
  - Shulba Sutra (containing geometry related to fire-altar construction)
    - Manava Sulbasutra
    - Baudhayana sutra
  - Shatapatha Brahmana – Commentary on the Vedas
  - Nirukta (technical treatise on etymology, lexical category and the semantics of Sanskrit words)
  - Kausitaka Upanishad
- Greek:
  - Hesiod: Theogony and Works and Days
  - Archilochus
  - Alcman
  - Semonides of Amorgos
  - Solon
  - Mimnermus
  - Stesichorus
- Paleo-Hebrew alphabet:
  - Ketef Hinnom amulets, the oldest found Biblical text (amulets with the Priestly Blessing, which are recorded in the Book of Numbers)
- Chinese:
  - Classic of Documents (Shūjīng) (authentic portions)
- Akkadian:
  - Dynastic Chronicle
  - Eclectic Chronicle
  - Marduk Prophecy

==== 6th century BC ====
- Sanskrit:
  - Sushruta: Sushruta Samhita (Book on Surgery and Medicine)
  - Kapila: Samkhya-sutra, Kapilanyayabhasa, Kapila Gita, Dṛṣṭantara Yoga
  - Kanada: Vaiśeṣika Sūtra (Book on Atomism)
  - Kashyapa Samhhita (Book on Medicine)
  - Pratishakhyas
- Greek:
  - Sappho
  - Ibycus
  - Alcaeus of Mytilene
  - Aesop's Fables
- Akkadian:
  - The Autobiography of Adad-guppi
  - Abnu šikinšu
  - Nabonidus Chronicle
  - Verse Account of Nabonidus
  - Cyrus Cylinder

==== 5th century BC ====
- Sanskrit:
  - Pāṇini:Aṣṭādhyāyī
  - Kenopanishad
  - Apastamba Dharmasutra, Apastambha Smriti
- Avestan: Yasht
- Chinese:
  - Spring and Autumn Annals (Chūnqiū) (722–481 BC, chronicles of the state of Lu)
  - Confucius: Analects (Lúnyǔ)
  - Classic of Rites (Lǐjì)
  - Commentaries of Zuo (Zuǒ Zhuàn)
  - Mozi: Mozi
  - Sun Tzu: The Art of War (Sūnzǐ Bīngfǎ)
  - Guoyu: Discourses of the States
  - Yanzi Chunqiu: Annals of Master Yan
  - Wenzi: Book of Master Wen
- Greek:
  - Pindar: odes
  - Herodotus: The Histories of Herodotus
  - Thucydides: History of the Peloponnesian War
  - Aeschylus: The Suppliants, The Persians, Seven Against Thebes, Oresteia
  - Sophocles: Oedipus Rex, Oedipus at Colonus, Antigone, Electra and other plays
  - Euripides: Alcestis, Medea, Heracleidae, Hippolytus, Andromache, Hecuba, The Suppliants, Electra, Heracles, Trojan Women, Iphigeneia in Tauris, Ion, Helen, Phoenician Women, Orestes, Bacchae, Iphigeneia at Aulis, Cyclops, Rhesus
  - Aristophanes: The Acharnians, The Knights, The Clouds, The Wasps, Peace, The Birds, Lysistrata, Thesmophoriazusae, The Frogs, Ecclesiazousae, Plutus
- Hebrew: date of the extant text of the Torah

==== 4th century BC ====
- Sanskrit:
  - Katha Upanishad
  - Prashnopanishad
  - Mundaka Upanishad
  - Māṇḍūkya Upanishad
  - Bhadrabahu: Kalpa Sūtra
  - Chanakya: Arthashastra, Chanakya Neeti
  - Salihotra: Shalihotra Samhita (treatise on veterinary medicine)
  - Vyasa: Mahabharata, Puranas, Brahma Sutras
  - Jaimini: Mimamsa Sutras, Jaimini Sutras, Ashvamedhika Parva
  - Valmiki: Ramayana
  - Bhāsa: Svapnavasavadattam, Pancarātra, Pratijna Yaugandharayaanam, Pratimanātaka, Abhishekanātaka, Bālacharita, Karnabhāram, Dūtaghaṭotkaca, Chārudatta, Madhyamavyayoga and Urubhanga.
- Hebrew: Book of Job, beginning of Hebrew wisdom literature
- Chinese:
  - Laozi (or Lao Tzu): Tao Te Ching
  - Zhuangzi: Zhuangzi
  - Mencius: Mencius (Mèngzǐ)
  - Shanhai Jing: Classic of Mountains and Seas
  - Li Sao: Encountering Sorrow
  - Nine Songs (Jiǔ Gē)
  - Heavenly Questions (Tiān Wèn)
  - Nine Pieces (Jiǔ Zhāng)
  - Yuan You (Far-off Journey)
  - Shang Yang: Book of Lord Shang (Shāng jūn shū)
  - Shizi: Book of Master Shi
  - Guiguzi: Sage of Ghost Valley
  - Huangdi Sijing: Yellow Emperor's Four Classics
  - Tale of King Mu, Son of Heaven (Mù Tiānzǐ Zhuàn)
  - Wuzi: Wu Qi's Art of War
  - Sun Bin's Art of War (Sūn Bìn Bīngfǎ)
  - The Methods of the Sima (Sīmǎ Fǎ)
  - Li Kui: Book of Law
- Persian:
  - DNa inscription
- Greek:
  - Xenophon: Anabasis, Cyropaedia, Oeconomicus, Memorabilia, Hellenica
  - Aristotle: Nicomachean Ethics, Metaphysics, Organon, Physics, Historia Animalium, De Partibus Animalium, De Motu Animalium, De Mundo, De Caelo, Poetics, Politics, Magna Moralia, Eudemian Ethics
  - Plato: Euthyphro, Apology, Crito, Theaetetus, Parmenides, Symposium, Phaedrus, Protagoras, Gorgias, Meno, Republic, Timaeus, Critias, Laws, Menexenus, Phaedo, Lysis, Alcibiades I, Alcibiades II, Hippias minor, Epinomis, Minos, Hipparchus, Ion
  - Euclid: Elements
  - Menander: Dyskolos
  - Theophrastus: Enquiry into Plants
- Egyptian:
  - Famine Stela

==== 3rd century BC ====
- Avestan: Avesta
- Chinese:
  - Lüshi Chunqiu: Master Lü's Spring and Autumn Annals
  - Yi Zhoushu: Lost Book of Zhou
  - Erya: Ancient dictionary
  - Hanfeizi: Book of Master Han Fei
  - Xunzi: Book of Master Xun
  - Wei Liaozi: Book of Master Wei Liao
  - Gongsun Longzi: Book of Master Gongsun Long
  - Cangjiepian: Cang Jie's Chapter
  - Lament for Ying (Āi Yǐng)
  - Bu Ju: Divination
  - Yu Fu: Fisherman
  - Nine Changes (Jiǔ Biàn)
  - Zhao Hun: Summons of the Soul
  - Da Zhao: The Great Summons
  - Sorrow for Troth Betrayed (Xī Shì)
- Etruscan: Liber Linteus Zagrabiensis (Linen Book of Zagreb)
- Sanskrit:
  - Pingala: Chandaḥśāstra
  - Moggaliputta-Tissa: Kathavatthu
  - Kātyāyana: Vārttikakāra, Śulbasūtras
  - Vishnu Sharma: Panchatantra
  - Vedanga Jyotisha
  - Bharata Muni: Natya Shastra (A theoretical treatise on classical Indian dance and drama)
- Elu (Sri Lankan Prakrit): Sīhalattakathā or Hela Atuwā (Pali commentaries of Buddhist teachings that were translated into Sinhalese after the introduction of Buddhism to Sri Lanka)
- Tamil:
  - 3rd century BC to 3rd century AD: Sangam poems
  - Tolkāppiyam (grammar book)
  - Korakkar (3rd century BC) Siddhar, Physician, Philosopher
  - Bogar (3rd century BC) Siddhar, Physician, Yogi
  - Agattiyam
- Hebrew: Ecclesiastes
- Greek:
  - Apollonius of Rhodes: Argonautica
  - Callimachus (310/305-240 BC), lyric poet
  - Manetho: Aegyptiaca
  - Theocritus, lyric poet
- Latin:
  - Lucius Livius Andronicus (c. 280/260 BC — c. 200 BC), translator, founder of Roman drama
  - Gnaeus Naevius (c. 264 — 201 BC), dramatist, epic poet
  - Titus Maccius Plautus (c. 254 — 184 BC), dramatist, composer of comedies: Poenulus, Miles Gloriosus, and other plays
  - Quintus Fabius Pictor (3rd century BC), historian
  - Lucius Cincius Alimentus (3rd century BC), military historian and antiquarian
- Egyptian:
  - Demotic Chronicle
  - Oracle of the Potter
- Akkadian:
  - Crimes and Sacrileges of Nabu-šuma-iškun
  - Religious Chronicle

==== 2nd century BC ====
- Sanskrit:
  - Patanjali (founder of yoga school of philosophy): Mahābhāṣya (treatise on grammar and linguistics), Patanjalatantra (medical text), Yoga Sūtras
  - Badrayana (founder of Vedanta school of philosophy): Brahma Sutras
  - Manu: Manusmriti (Laws of Manu)
- Avestan: Vendidad
- Chinese:
  - Sima Qian: Records of the Grand Historian (Shǐ Jì)
  - Huainanzi: Book of the Huai'nan Masters
  - Sima Xiangru
  - Six Secret Teachings (Liù Tāo)
  - Book of Gods and Strange Things (Shényì Jīng)
  - Seven Remonstrances (Qī Jiàn)
  - Summons for a Recluse (Zhāo Yǐnshì)
  - Alas That My Lot Was Not Cast (Āi Shí Mìng)
  - Jia Yi: The Faults of Qin (Guò Qín Lùn)
- Aramaic: Book of Daniel
- Hebrew: Sirach
- Greek:
  - Polybius: The Histories
  - Book of Wisdom
  - Septuagint
- Latin:
  - Terence (195/185 BC — 159 BC), comic dramatist: The Brothers, The Girl from Andros, Eunuchus, The Self-Tormentor
  - Quintus Ennius (239 BC — c. 169 BC), poet
  - Marcus Pacuvius (c. 220 BC — 130 BC), tragic dramatist, poet
  - Statius Caecilius (220 BC — 168/166 BC), comic dramatist
  - Marcius Porcius Cato (234 BC — 149 BC), generalist, topical writer
  - Gaius Acilius (2nd century BC), historian
  - Lucius Accius (170 BC — c. 86 BC), tragic dramatist, philologist
  - Gaius Lucilius (c. 160s BC — 103/2 BC), satirist
  - Quintus Lutatius Catulus (2nd century BC), public officer, epigrammatist
  - Aulus Furius Antias (2nd century BC), poet
  - Gaius Julius Caesar Strabo Vopiscus (130 BC — 87 BC), public officer, tragic dramatist
  - Lucius Pomponius Bononiensis (2nd century BC), comic dramatist, satirist
  - Lucius Cassius Hemina (2nd century BC), historian
  - Lucius Calpurnius Piso Frugi (2nd century BC), historian
  - Manius Manilius (2nd century BC), public officer, jurist
  - Lucius Coelius Antipater (2nd century BC), jurist, historian
  - Publius Sempronius Asellio (158 BC — after 91 BC), military officer, historian
  - Gaius Sempronius Tuditanus (2nd century BC), jurist
  - Lucius Afranius (2nd & 1st centuries BC), comic dramatist
  - Titus Albucius (2nd & 1st centuries BC), orator
  - Publius Rutilius Rufus (158 BC — after 78 BC), jurist
  - Quintus Lutatius Catulus (2nd & 1st centuries BC), public officer, poet
  - Lucius Aelius Stilo Praeconinus (154 BC — 74 BC), philologist
  - Quintus Claudius Quadrigarius (2nd & 1st centuries BC), historian
  - Valerius Antias (2nd & 1st centuries BC), historian
  - Lucius Cornelius Sisenna (121 BC — 67 BC), soldier, historian
  - Quintus Cornificius (2nd & 1st centuries BC), rhetorician
- Pali: Tipitaka

==== 1st century BC ====
- Chinese:
  - Shuo Yuan: Garden of Talks
  - Zhan Guo Ce: Annals of the Warring States
  - Taixuanjing: Canon of Supreme Mystery
  - Fangyan: Regional Speech
  - Liexian Zhuan: Biographies of Immortals
  - Jijiupian: Quick Mastery of the Characters
  - Three Strategies of Huang Shigong (Huáng Shígōng Sānlüè)
  - Nine Regrets (Jiǔ Huái)
  - Nine Laments (Jiǔ Tàn)
- Pali (Sri Lanka): Pāli Tripiṭaka (written under the patronage of King Vattagamani of Anuradhapura in Aluhihare, Matale)
- Latin:
  - Cicero: Catiline Orations, Pro Caelio, Dream of Scipio
  - Julius Caesar: Gallic Wars, Civil War
  - Virgil: Eclogues, Georgics and Aeneid
  - Lucretius: On the Nature of Things
  - Livy: History of Rome (Ab Urbe Condita)

==== 1st century AD ====
- Sanskrit:
  - Śabara: Śābara-bhāṣyam
  - Gunadhara:Kasayapahuda
  - Aśvaghoṣa:Buddhacharita (Acts of the Buddha), Saundarananda, Sutralankara
- Chinese:
  - Ban Gu: Book of Han (Hàn Shū)
  - Lun Heng: Discourses in the Balance
  - Spring and Autumn Annals of Wu and Yue (Wúyuè Chūnqiū)
  - Nine Longings (Jiǔ Sī)
- Greek:
  - Plutarch: Lives of the Noble Greeks and Romans
  - Josephus: The Jewish War, Antiquities of the Jews, Against Apion
  - The books of the New Testament of the Christian Bible and the Didache
- Latin: see Classical Latin
  - Tacitus: Germania
  - Ovid: Metamorphoses; also Tristia and Epistulae ex Ponto written during his exile
  - Pliny the Elder: Natural History
  - Petronius: Satyricon
  - Seneca the Younger: Phaedra, Dialogues
  - Statius: Thebaid; also Silvae and unfinished Achilleid
- Egyptian:
  - Oracle of the Lamb

==== 2nd century ====
- Chinese:
  - Shuowen Jiezi: Ancient Dictionary
  - Cantong Qi: The Kinship of the Three
  - Fengsu Tongyi: Comprehensive Meaning of Customs and Mores
  - Nineteen Old Poems (Gǔshī Shíjiǔ Shǒu)
  - Taiping Jing: Scriptures of the Great Peace
  - Eighteen Songs of a Nomad Flute (Hú Jiā Shí Bā Pāi)
  - Zhang Heng
- Sanskrit: Aśvaghoṣa: Buddhacharita (Acts of the Buddha)
- Pahlavi:
  - Yadegar-e Zariran (Memorial of Zarēr)
  - Visperad
  - Drakht-i Asurig (The Babylonian Tree)
- Greek:
  - Arrian: Anabasis Alexandri
  - Marcus Aurelius: Meditations
  - Epictetus and Arrian: Enchiridion
  - Ptolemy: Almagest, Tetrabiblos
  - Athenaeus: The Banquet of the Learned
  - Pausanias: Description of Greece
  - Longus: Daphnis and Chloe
  - Lucian: True History
  - The Shepherd of Hermas
- Latin: see Classical Latin
  - Apuleius: The Golden Ass
  - Lucius Ampelius: Liber Memorialis
  - Suetonius: Lives of the Twelve Caesars
  - Tertullian: Apologeticus

==== 3rd century ====
- Avestan: Khordeh Avesta (Zoroastrian prayer book)
- Pahlavi: Mani: Shabuhragan (Manichaean holy book)
- Chinese:
  - Chen Shou: Records of Three Kingdoms (三國志, Sānguó Zhì)
  - Zhang Hua: 博物志, Bowuzhi
  - Xiang'er: 老子想爾注, Lǎozi Xiǎng'ěr Zhù
  - Lieyi Zhuan: 列異傳, Arrayed Marvels
  - Lu Ji: 文賦, Wen fu (Essay on Literature)
  - Xijing Zaji: 西京雜記, Miscellaneous Records of the Western Capital
  - Jian'an poetry (建安風骨, Jiàn'ān Fēnggǔ)
  - The Peacock Flies Southeast (孔雀東南飛, Kǒngquè Dōngnán Fēi)
  - Cao Zhi
  - Ji Kang
  - Ruan Ji
  - Zuo Si
  - Pan Yue
- Greek: Plotinus: Enneads
- Latin: see Late Latin
  - Distichs of Cato
- Hebrew: Mishnah
- Pali (Sri Lanka): Dīpavaṃsa

=== Late Antiquity ===
==== 4th century ====
- Latin: see Late Latin
  - Augustine of Hippo: Confessions, On Christian Doctrine
  - Faltonia Betitia Proba: Cento Vergilianus de laudibus Christi (A Virgilian Cento Concerning the Glory of Christ)
  - Apicius (De re coquinaria, On the Subject of Cooking)
  - Pervigilium Veneris (Vigil of Venus)
- Sanskrit:
  - Asanga: Dharma-dharmata-vibhaga (Distinguishing Phenomena and Pure Being), Mahāyānasaṃgraha (Summary of the Great Vehicle)
  - Vasubandhu: Verses on the Treasury of the Abhidharma, Pañcaskandhaprakaraṇa (Explanation of the Five Aggregates), Pañcaskandhaprakaraṇa (Explanation of the Five Aggregates), Vyākhyāyukti (Proper Mode of Exposition), Vādavidhi (Rules for Debate), Dharmadharmatāvibhāgavṛtti (Commentary on Distinguishing Elements from Reality), Madhyāntavibhāgabhāṣya (Commentary on Distinguishing the Middle from the Extremes), Mahāyānasūtrālaṃkārabhāṣya (Commentary on the Ornament to the Great Vehicle Discourses)
  - Dignāga: Pramāṇa-samuccaya (Compendium of Valid Cognition), Hetucakra (The wheel of reason)
  - Haribhadra: Anekāntajayapatākā (The Victory Banner of Anekantavada (Relativism)), Dhūrtākhyāna (The Rogue's Stories), Yogadṛṣṭisamuccaya (An Array of Views on Yoga), Ṣaḍdarśanasamuccaya (Compendium of Six Philosophies)
- Chinese:
  - Liezi: Book of Master Lie
  - Baopuzi: Simplex One
  - In Search of the Supernatural (Sōu Shén Jì)
  - Ziyuan: Character Garden
  - Shiyiji: Forgotten Tales
  - Shenxian Zhuan: Biographies of the Deities and Immortals
  - Lantingji Xu: Preface to the Poems Composed at the Orchid Pavilion
  - Star Gauge (Xuánjī Tú)
- Syriac: Aphrahat, Ephrem the Syrian
- Aramaic: Jerusalem Talmud
- Pali (Sri Lanka): Mahāvaṃsa

==== 5th century ====
- Armenian:
  - Movses Khorenatsi: History of Armenia
- Chinese:
  - A New Account of the Tales of the World (世說新語, Shì Shuō Xīn Yǔ)
  - The Literary Mind and the Carving of Dragons (文心雕龍, Wén Xīn Diāo Lóng)
  - Bao Zhao: Fu on the Ruined City (蕪城賦, Wú Chéng Fù)
  - Fan Ye: Book of the Later Han (後漢書, Hòuhàn Shū)
  - You Ming Lu (幽明錄, Collection of Supernatural Tales)
  - Zhengao (真誥, Declarations of the Perfected)
  - Tao Yuanming
  - Xie Lingyun
  - Xie Tiao
  - Shen Yue
- Sanskrit:
  - Kālidāsa (speculated): Abhijñānaśākuntalam (अभिज्ञान शाकुन्तलम्, "The Recognition of Shakuntala"), Meghadūta (मेघदूत, "Cloud Messenger"), Vikramōrvaśīyam (विक्रमोर्वशीयम्, "Urvashi Won by Valour", play)
  - Pujyapada: Iṣṭopadeśa (Divine Sermons), Sarvārthasiddhi (Attainment of Higher Goals), Jainendra Vyākaraṇa (Jainendra Grammar), Samādhitantra (Method of Self Contemplation), Daśabhaktyādisangraha (Collection of Ten Adorations) ,Śabdāvatāranyāsa (Arrangement of Words and their Forms)
  - Aryabhata: Aryabhatiya
  - Kamandaka: Nitisara (The Elements of Polity)
  - Bodhidharma: Two Entrances and Four Practices, Treatise on Realizing the Nature, Refuting Signs Treatise
  - Bhartṛhari: Vākyapadīya (treatise on Sanskrit grammar and linguistic philosophy), Śatakatraya (the three hundred poems of moral values)
  - Siddhasena: Nyāyāvatāra, Sanmati sutra, Kalyan Mandir stotra
  - Sarvanandi: Lokavibhaga (text on Jain cosmology)
- Tamil:
  - Tirukkural (Sacred Verses)
  - Silappatikaram (The Tale of the Anklet)
- Pahlavi:
  - Matigan-i Hazar Datistan (The Thousand Laws of the Magistan)
  - Frahang-i Oim-evak (Pahlavi-Avestan dictionary)
- Pali (Sri Lanka):
  - Buddhaghosa: Visuddhimagga (The Path of Purification)
- Latin: see Late Latin
  - Publius Flavius Vegetius Renatus: De Re Militari
  - Augustine of Hippo: The City of God
  - Paulus Orosius: Seven Books of History Against the Pagans
  - Jerome: Vulgate
  - Prudentius: Psychomachia
  - Consentius's grammar
  - Pseudo-Dionysius the Areopagite: De Coelesti Hierarchia (Περὶ τῆς Οὐρανίας Ἱεραρχίας, On the Celestial Hierarchy), Mystical Theology
  - Socrates of Constantinople: Historia Ecclesiastica
- Greek:
  - Nonnus: Dionysiaca

==== 6th century ====
- Chinese:
  - Wen Xuan (文選, Selections of Refined Literature)
  - Shui Jing Zhu (水經注, Commentary on the Water Classic)
  - New Songs from the Jade Terrace (玉台新詠, Yù Tái Xīn Yǒng)
  - Jingchu Suishiji (荊楚歲時記, Records of the Seasons of Jingchu)
  - Thousand Character Classic (千字文, Qiān Zì Wén)
  - The Ballad of Mulan (木蘭詩, Mù Lán Shī)
- Latin: Boethius: De consolatione philosophiae (The Consolation of Philosophy)
- Aramaic: Babylonian Talmud
- Sanskrit:
  - Varāhamihira: Pañcasiddhāntikā ([Treatise] on the Five [Astronomical] Canons), Brihat-Samhita (Great Compilation) encyclopedic work
  - Yativṛṣabha: Tiloya Panatti (Book on Cosmology and Mathematics)
  - Virahanka
  - Prabhākara: Triputipratyaksavada (Doctrine of Triple Perception)
  - Dharmakirti: Saṃbandhaparikṣhāvrtti (Analysis of Relations), Pramāṇaviniścaya (Ascertainment of Valid Cognition), Nyāyabinduprakaraṇa (Drop of Logic), Hetubindunāmaprakaraṇa (Drop of Reason), Saṃtānāntarasiddhināmaprakaraṇa (Proof of Others' Mindstreams), Vādanyāyanāmaprakaraṇa (Reasoning for Debate)
  - Praśastapāda: Padārtha-dharma-saṅgraha (Collection of Properties of Matter)
  - Bhāviveka: Heart of the Middle, Wisdom Lamp
  - Udyotakara: Nyāyavārttika (Work on logic)
  - Gaudapada: Mandukya Karika
- Sinhalese:
  - Wansaththppakāsinī (Sinhalese translation of the Pali Mahāvaṃsa)
  - Sigiriya Poems (poems written by visitors to the citadel of Sigiriya)
- Pali (Sri Lanka): Cūḷavaṃsa
- Irish: Early Irish literature
  - Dallán Forgaill: Amra (life of Saint Columba)

== See also ==
- Early medieval literature
- List of languages by first written accounts
- List of years in literature
- List of oldest documents
- List of Hebrew Bible manuscripts
- Biblical manuscript
