= Drakht-i Asurig =

Parthian poem

Drakht ī Āsūrīg ("The Babylonian Tree") is a Parthian-language poem consisting of about 120 verses and written in the Book Pahlavi script. The language shows influences from Middle Persian. It is one of the oldest existing texts in the Parthian language.

The poem is framed as a dialogue between a goat and a palm tree. At the end, the goat is proclaimed to be victorious. The Iranians may have adopted this genre (the disputation or debate poem) from the oral traditions of ancient Mesopotamia.

Some scholars consider the goat and the palm tree to be the symbols of Zoroastrianism and the Babylonian religion, or simply the pastoral life and agricultural life, respectively.

The poem is also considered wisdom literature.

A similar but less significant story, "The story of the vine and the ewe" (رز و میش raz o mīš), has been recorded in Persian literature.

== See also ==
- Asurestan
