= Zhuo Wenjun =

Chinese poet

- 卓文君
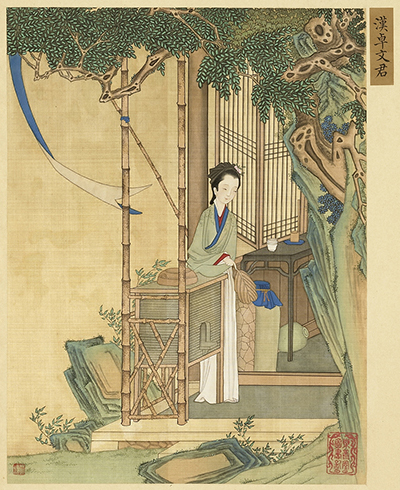
- Zhuo Wenjun depicted in He Dazai's (赫達資) Gathering Gems of Beauty (畫麗珠萃秀), from the Qing dynasty
- Born: 175 BCE
- Died: 121 BCE

Zhuo Wenjun (Note: Chinese: 卓文君) (175 – 121 BCE) was a Chinese poet of the Western Han dynasty.

Some of her most popular works include Bai Tou Yin (Chant about Old Age), Juebie Shu (Farewell Letter) and Yuanlang Shi (Blaming Husband Poem), although some scholars debate her authorship.

== Biography ==
Zhuo Wenjun was a lady from the Zhuo family of the Sichuan province, and her father was Zhuo Wangsun. She was highly educated, and especially skilled at music and poetry. Married at sixteen, she was soon widowed and returned to her parents. Sima Xiangru, a famous poet and musician, during a stay in Chengdu, was invited to their home by the Zhuos. Zhuo Wenjun fell in love with him when she saw him play the qin and did not hesitate to run away with him. Angry, her father denied her any support. Finding herself in poverty because her new husband's family was not rich, Zhuo Wenjun opened a wine shop. Ashamed that his daughter was a simple innkeeper, her father relented and gave them money and servants.

Emperor Wu learned of Sima Xiangru's talent and offered him an official cargo in the capital. There, Sima distanced himself not only physically from his wife, but also wrote her a letter informing her of his intent to take a concubine. Saddened, Zhuo Wenjun replied with a long poem that moved him so deeply that he was ashamed of his plan and returned with her, living together until their old age. When he died, she composed a funeral ode in his honor.

== Popular media ==
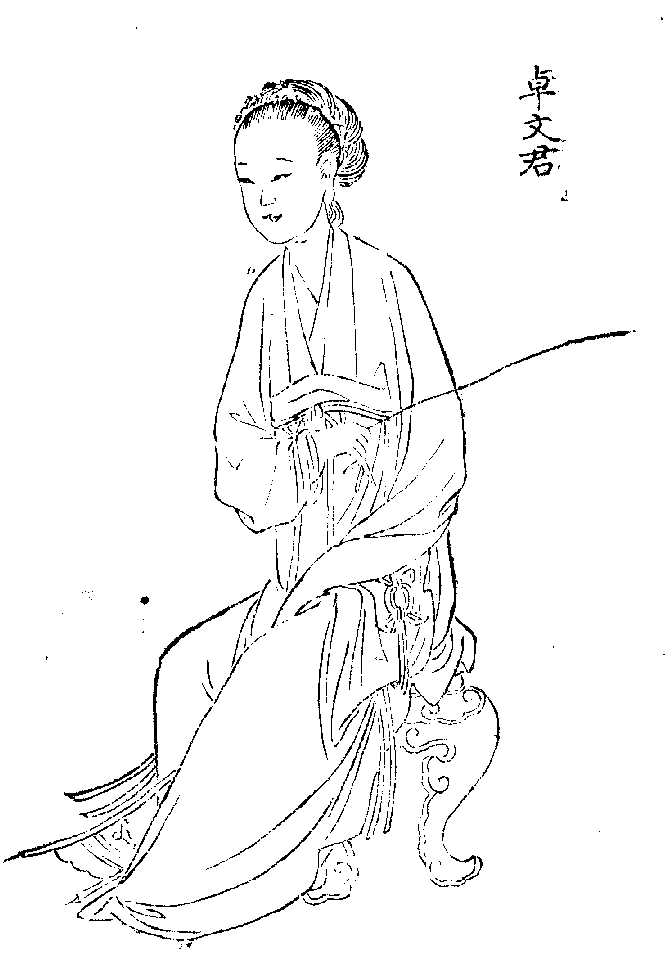
Portrait of Zhuo Wenjun, c. 1772

She is portrayed by Park Si-yeon in the 2004 Chinese television series Feng Qiu Huang.
