= Zhuang Ji (poet) =

Zhuang Ji (simplified Chinese: 庄忌; traditional Chinese: 莊忌; pinyin: Zhuāng Jì) had the courtesy name (zi) of Fuzi (夫子), literally, "the Master"; and, he was later sometimes referred to as Yan Ji (嚴忌) due to a naming taboo based on Han Mingdi (personal name Liu Zhuang). Zhuang Ji flourished in the second century BCE as an early Han dynasty writer of literature and court attendant. He is notable for being one of the most published poets ever, due to having authored the piece Ai shi ming "Alas That My Lot Was Not Cast", collected in the collection of verse Chuci. None of his other works are known to have survived. Zhuang Ji's biography is also sparse, although he is known to have been born in Wu state and later found refuge in Liang state. Zhuang Ji pursued a literary career, though he seems to have at least initially made a living attending his local ruler's court in some function.

== Biography ==
Little is known about the life of Zhuang Ji. However, there are historical records from the time which indicate the environmental background of his times. This was during the early Han dynasty, which was divided up into semi-autonomous states ruled by princes of the Liu family, the royal family of Han. His two main patrons were both princes of the Liu dynastic family, and rulers of semi-autonomous states (under nominal loyalty to the emperor -- vassal states of the early Han). Zhuang Ji's first patron was Liu Pi, who reigned as King or Prince of Wu from 216 to 154 BCE. Wu (吳) was Zhuang Ji's home state. Zhuang Zhu, a son or nephew of Zhuang Ji, became a courtier to the emperor Han Wudi, initially chosen by tested merit through the imperial examination system, and later becoming personally promoted by Wudi to be Palace Grandee (zhong dafu), Zhuang Zhu became one of Wu's favorite courtiers.

== Early life ==
Zhuang Ji was a native of Wu, now southern Jiangsu, born in Kuaiji Commandery. Wu had formerly been part of the Warring States kingdom of Chu, for which the Chuci poetry anthology was named, and largely inspired by.

=== At the court of Liu Pi, prince of Wu ===
Zhuang Ji eventually served at the court of Liu Pi, Prince of Wu (reigned 195 BCE - 154 BCE). He served there with his two friends Zou Yang and Mei Sheng. They presumably found some use for their literary skills, or perhaps they served as advisors of some sort; however, Liu Pi left no surviving works.

=== Rebellion of the Seven States ===
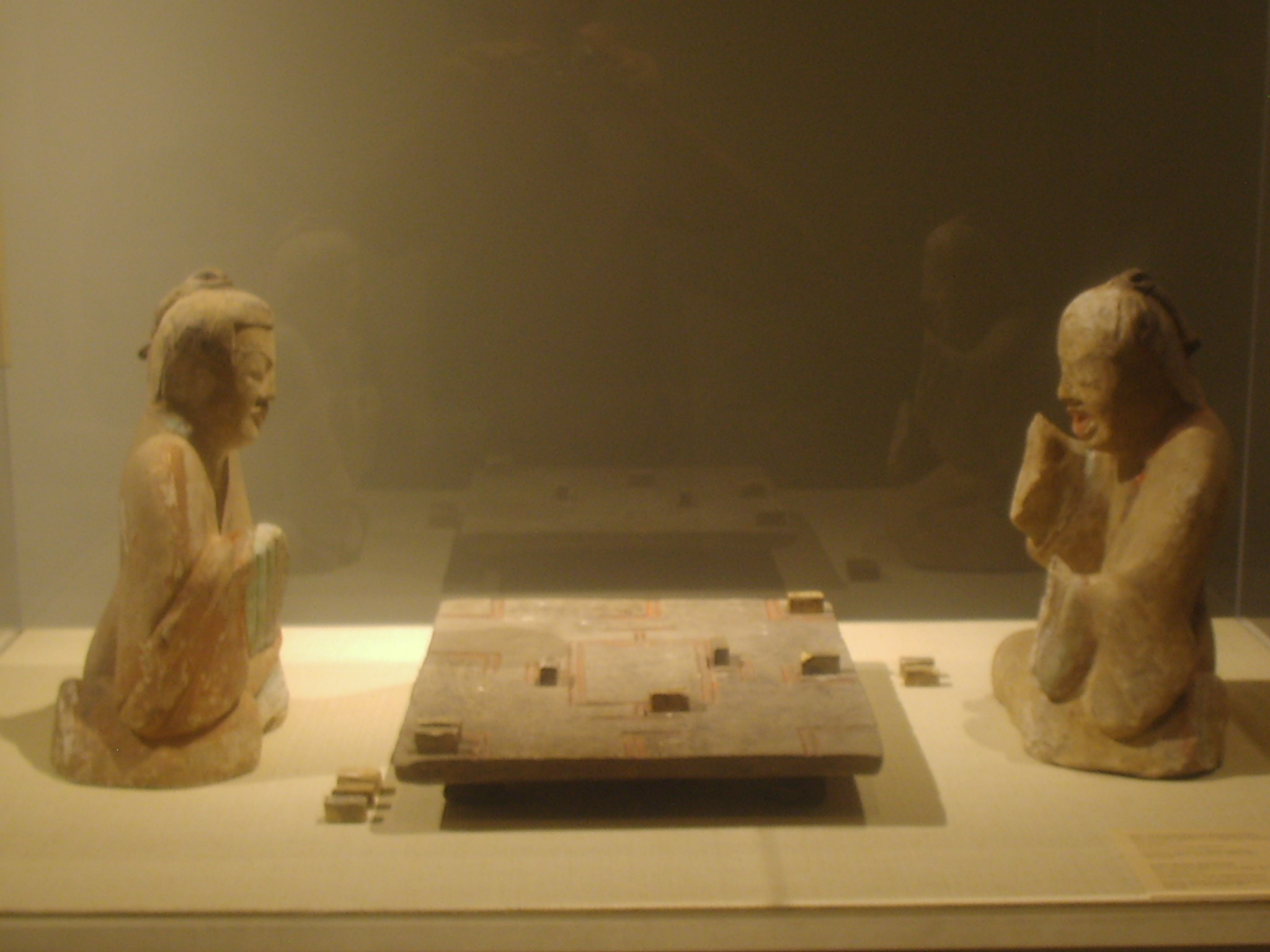
Earthenware figures playing liubo, Han dynasty

According to Sima Qian, prince Liu Pi's son Liu Xian and his relative crown prince Liu Qi became involved in a game of liubo, which ended in the crown prince killing Liu Xian with the game board. Wendi died in 157 BCE and Qi became Emperor Han Jingdi. Liu Pi started building up wealth and military strength in Wu state in reaction to this. Jingdi then fell under the influence of his warmongering Legalist minister Chao Cuo. This was followed by an imperial campaign to reduce the strength, if not eliminate, the semi-independent princes to consolidate power in the central empire. Perceiving the threat of the emperor, in 154 BCE prince Pi convinced six other ruling princes to rebel against the Han emperor; however, some of the rulers such as Liu Wu of Liang remained loyal vassals to Jingdi. This was the beginning of what is known as the Rebellion of the Seven States, or the Vassals' Rebellion.

== Later life ==
=== At the court of Liu Wu, prince of Liang ===
Zhuang, Zou, and Mei seem to have taken the opportunity to leave Wu at some point before the rebellion, perhaps in 157 BCE. Furthermore, Zhuang Ji's companions Zou Yang and Mei Cheng had advised Liu Pi to not revolt against the Han emperor, advice which was rejected. The three went to Liang, where they obtained the patronage of Liu Wu, Prince of Liang, the Han emperor's younger brother and a great patron of the literary arts.

=== Princes' Rebellion ===
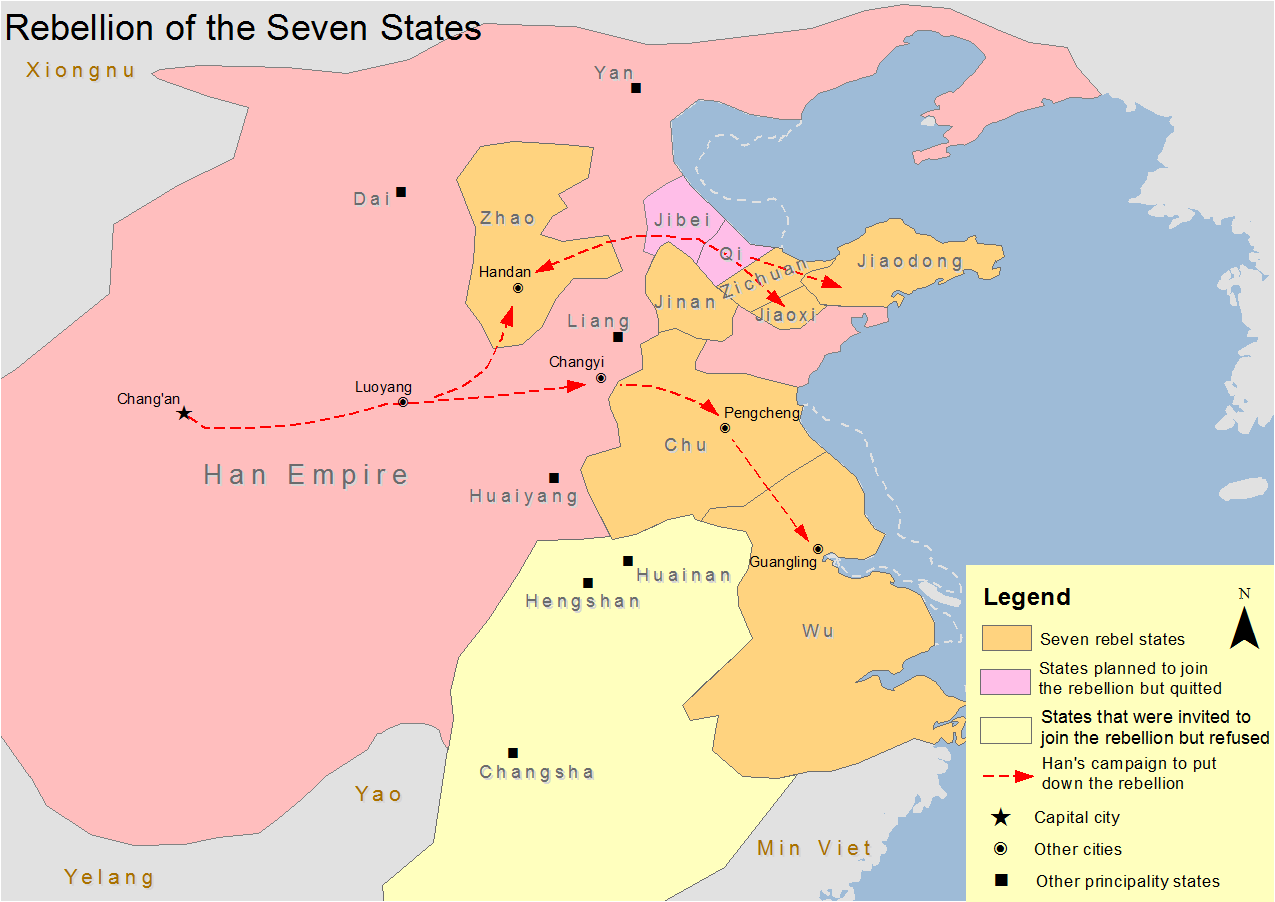
Map depicting the Rebellion of the Seven States

in 154 BCE, emperor Jingdi ordered punishing reduction of many of the states, including carving out the commanderies of Huiji and Yuzhang from the state of Wu. Minister Yuan Ang persuaded the emperor that Chao Cuo's claims of the vassal princes' disloyalty was overstated, and in response, Jing had minister Chao Cuo executed.

==== Uprising ====
The seven princes rose in armed rebellion with the support of allied southern independent kingdoms of Donghai (modern Zhejiang) and Minyue (modern Fujian), which sent troops in aid. This was known as the Rebellion of the Seven States or the Vassals' War. Allied princes included Zhuang Ji's former patron Liu Pi. These princes attacked the state of Liang, ruled by Zhuang Ji's new patron Liu Wu, Prince of Liang (刘武; 劉武). The rebel armies, particularly those of Wu and Chu, besieged Liu Wu's capital Suiyang (睢陽).

==== Response ====
The empress dowager Xiaowen urged her son the emperor to send the imperial army to relieve Liang and her younger son. The emperor appointed Zhou Yafu as general commander. General Zhou was a highly disciplined and effective general. After taking up his command, Zhou Yafu took advantage of the disorder among the rebel princes to establish a strong camp at Xiayi (下邑, modern Dangshan in Anhui) and thwart the rebel's line of supply and communication along the Si River, formerly a large and important watercourse. The rebels continued their unsuccessful assault on Zhuang Ji's new home in the capital of Liang Suiyang. With their supply lines cut by general Zhou's subordinate Han Tuidang's cavalry, the rebels fell back from their attack on Liang, deciding to attack general Zhou at his base in Xiayi. In the attack, the vassal prince's were easily defeated due to general Zhou's disciplined and effective preparations. The rebellion came to an end after three months of fighting.

==== Aftermath ====
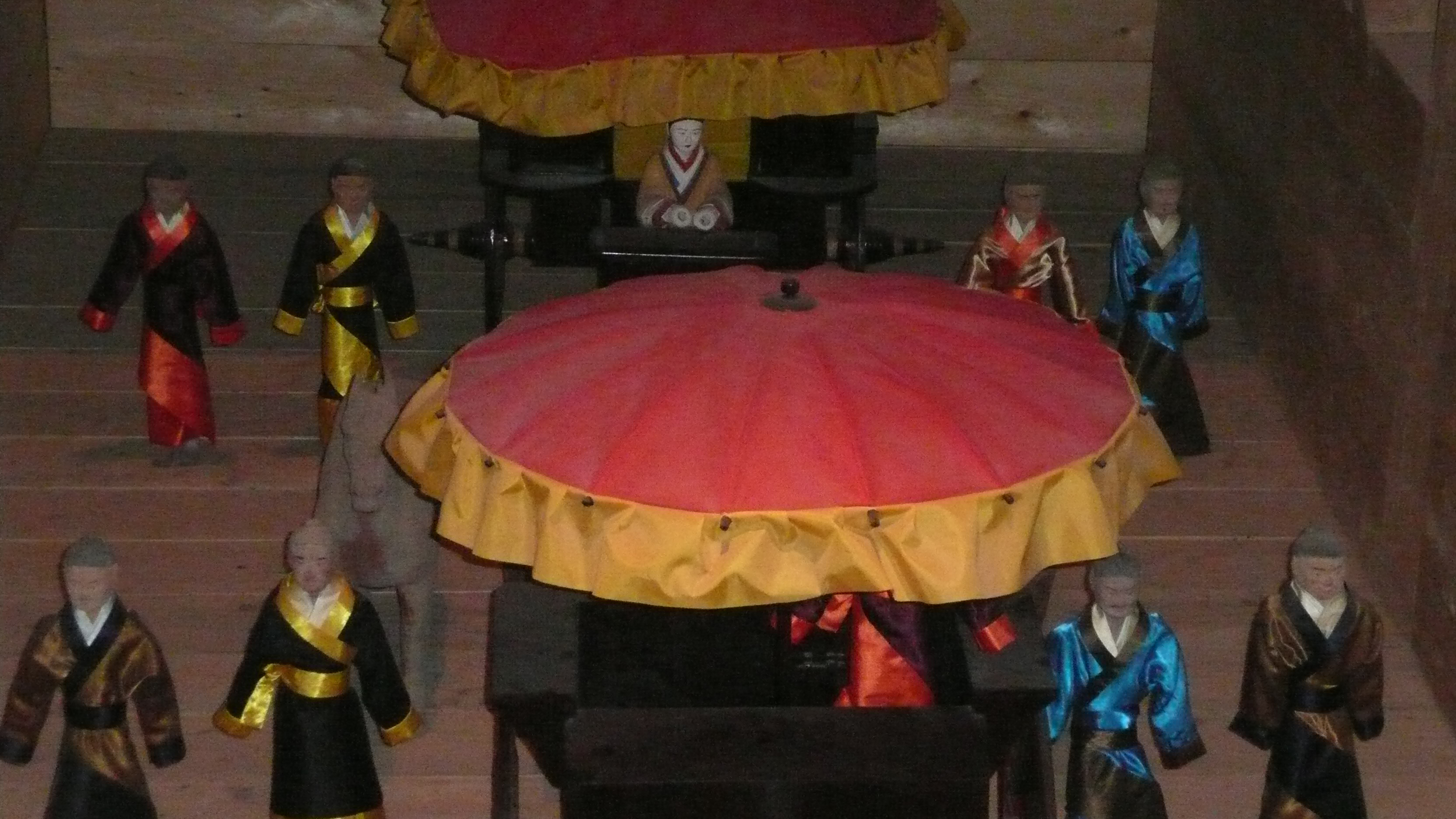
Close-up view of model of a Han official procession. Excavated from the tomb of emperor Jing and has second wife, namely Wang Zhi, mother of Han Wudi.

The rebel princes generally came to a bad end: Zhuang Ji's former patron Liu Pi, ruler of Wu fled and was killed in flight by native Yue (a term used for various non-Han Chinese peoples), which people his duty had been to suppress, and his territory of Wu divided up among Liu Wu's sons. In contrast Zhuang Ji's patron Liu Wu was rewarded for his loyal support through the rebellion, his brother emperor Jingdi giving him honors and privileges. Liu Wu's private gardens rivaled the emperor's and he increased the number of his retinue, bringing in people whose actions would end up losing the favor he had gained with the emperor and leading to his eventual fall from grace. When Jingdi demoted his son Liu Rong from crown prince (taizi, heir apparent), in 150 BCE, Liu Wu and Jingdi's mutual mother, empress dowager Dou took this opportunity to lobby for her son Jingdi to name her other son, Liu Wu, as crown prince and successor, rather than Jingdi promoting one of his sons to this position. Jingdi agreed initially, but was then talked out of it by advisors. For example, minister Yuan Ang warned strongly against this breaking of the laws of succession as a destabilizing precedent, appointing a brother rather than the usual practice of choosing a son. Proceeding in support of their patron, some of Liu Wu's new retainers then went out and murdered this minister, Yuan Ang, going on to commit a series of killings in the effort to regain their patron, Liu Wu's, position as crown prince and the opportunity to become emperor, if Jingdi were to suddenly die. When Jingdi found out about this intrigue, Liu Wu had his two retainers commit suicide, presenting their bodies to the emperor, in appeasement. Nevertheless, Liu Wu failed to regain favor after this, he was seldom received at court, and his half-nephew (the future emperor, Han Wudi) replaced him as crown prince. In another and related dangerous turn of events for Liu Wu, the new crown prince's mother Wang Zhi was promoted to first lady, consolidating power against him at court. However, Liu Wu did not loose support of all the powerful court females. His mother, empress dowager Dou, still supported him, refusing to eat until he was cleared of charges. After an official investigation, the report back to emperor Jingdi was that Liu Wu had been found to have been involved, that "sparing the Prince of Liang would break the law of Han", yet, "killing him would deeply distress the Empress Dowager and upset the Emperor even more", counseling Jingdi to drop the issue. In discussion with the women, he blamed the murders solely upon Liu Wu's two courtiers, now dead and already lawfully punished. After returning from an unsuccessful trip to Chang'an, Liu Wu died at home in Liang, in 144 BCE.

=== Literary patronage ===
Liu Wu, prince of Liang, became a famous patron, particularly notably of the fu author Sima Xiangru. More generally, his court was a center of the development of fu poetry/prose style, rivaling that of his brother Jingdi in Chang'an. Zhuang Ji was able to continue his literary efforts. His companion Zou Yang had one particularly influential piece was the "Memorial from Prison to the Prince of Liang", whereby Zou Yang successfully pleaded his case against the slander of other courtiers and freed himself from a death sentence by multiplying historical examples of the disaster of gossip and libel. Zhuang Ji and Mei Sheng were said to have been too frightened to protest Zou's arrest and consequent narrowly avoided death sentence. Liu Wu's death was at about age forty, keeping his court in Liang and the feudal possessions thereof, despite being out of favor with the emperor. Prince Liu Wu of Liang left behind an estate estimated to include 400,000 catties of gold and an equivalent amount of wealth in land. It is unknown whether Zhuang Ji outlived his patron.

== Works ==
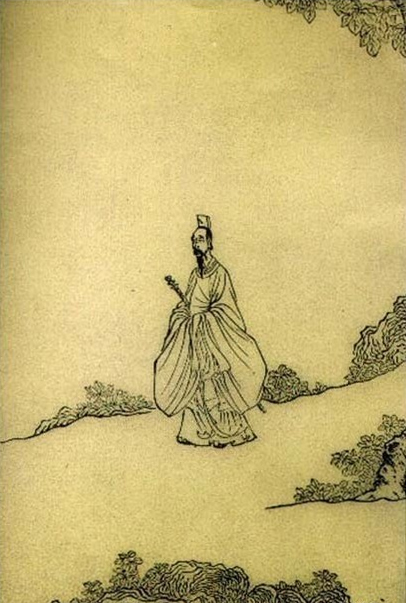
The archetypal sao poet, alone in the wilderness: Qu Yuan

Zhuang Ji is the writer of the Chuci anthology piece "Ai shi ming", or "Alas That My Lot Was Not Cast". The Chu ci, together with the Shijing, comprise the two major textual sources for ancient Chinese poetry. "Alas That My Lot Was Not Cast" is an example of the Sao type of Chu ci poetry, in the "O tempora o mores!" vein. "Ai shi ming" is written in the sao style initiated by Qu Yuan in his "Li sao". Zhuang Ji is also credited with writing 24 pieces in the fu-style in the Book of Han. Despite the mention of 24 fu in Hanshu, the only known surviving piece of Zhuang Ji is "Ai shi ming". Critical reception for Zhuang Ji's "Ai shi ming" has often been less than enthusiastic, despite his contemporaries nicknaming him "the Master", and even going so far as to extensively recycle parts of it as their own work. David Hawkes says that the poem incorporates all of the elements of the sao style: introspective grief, the symbolic structure, parallelism as a poetic device, and even a very brief shamanic-style spirit journey. However Hawkes finds the "inspiration dead" and the effect "monotonous and oppressive". Another point which he notes is to oppose the modern take on the poem to that of Zhuang Ji's contemporaries, whose taste for the poem was enhanced by their ability to particularly identify the "objects of his scorn and hatred", which is no longer possible due to lack of detailed information surviving into modern times. David Knechtes and Taiping Chan find that for the time in which it was written "Ai shi ming" has "eremitic sentiments" which were "rare in early Han" and that almost seem to be looking forward to Six Dynasties poetry.

== See also ==
- Alas That My Lot Was Not Cast
- Chuci
- Empress Wang Zhi
- Empress Dou (Wen)
- Han dynasty
- Liu Pengli
- Sima Xiangru
