= Nyāyāvatāra =

Information
- Religion: Jainism
- Author: Siddhasena
- Period: 5th century CE
- Verses: 32

Nyāyāvatāra (also called Dvatrimsika) was composed in fifth century CE.

== Author ==
It was written by Siddhasena in fifth century CE.

== Sources ==
- Balcerowicz, Piotr; Mejor, Marek, eds. (2004) [2002], Essays in Indian Philosophy, Religion and Literature (First Indian ed.), Delhi: Motilal Banarsidass, ISBN 9788120819788
