= Lokavibhaga =

Jain cosmological text

Information
- Author: Siṃhasūri
- Language: Sanskrit
- Period: 458 CE

The Lokavibhāga (literally "division of the universe") is a 5th-century Sanskrit text by Rishi Simhasuri. Its manuscript was first discovered in an Indian temple of Karnataka by M.R.R. Narasimhachar. The Lokavibhaga consists of 11 chapters and a total of 1737 verses (shlokas) distributed over these chapters. The text has an incomplete colophon, which states it was completed in a village named Patalika near Kanchi (Tamil Nadu) in the 22nd year of Simhavarman's rule in Banarastra. The colophon includes astronomical observations along with a samvat date and year which together indicate the surviving copy was completed on 25 August 458 CE.

The Lokavibhaga is notable as the oldest known text in the world that clearly uses three principles of positional decimal arithmetic system together – graphical signs and terms as numerals, assigning a value to the same numeral depending on the position it occupies in a number, and the use of fully operational zero. This Indian system contrasted with competing ancient arithmetic systems developed independently in Babylon, ancient Rome and China.

The text presents Jain cosmology. It has been claimed by the Digambara tradition of Jainism to be a Sanskrit translation of an older Prakrit-language text Loyavibhaga by Muni Sarvanandi. The Lokavibhaga mentions Sarvanandi and others, but does not mention any text called "Loyavibhaga". No manuscript copy of the claimed older Prakrit "Loyavibhaga" has been found so far.

The Lokavibhaga presents its cosmological ideas in a form that takes its mathematical system for granted. It is not a mathematical treatise, and it does not introduce principles of positional decimal arithmetic system. The arithmetic system used in Lokavibhaga text, state Jain and Dani, must have been invented earlier by someone else in some other context. That system of expressing numbers with positional decimal arithmetic was accepted and must have been in wide use in India by mid 5th-century to appear as it does in the Lokavibhaga text. The same Indian arithmetic system and operations appears in the mathematical treatise of Aryabhata published in 510 CE.

The surviving manuscripts of the Lokavibhāga are listed in the New Catalogus Catalogorum. The published edition of the surviving Lokvibhaga manuscript is a palm leaf copy of the original Sanskrit text, likely from 11th or 12th century. The text was edited and translated in 1962 into the Hindi language by Balachandra Siddhanta-Shastri.
