= Aulus Furius Antias =

Furius Antias was an ancient Roman poet, born in Antium.

Following William Smith, Dictionary of Greek and Roman Biography and Mythology, (1870), art. Bibaculus, his full name was Aulus Furius Antias and he was the poet Furius whose friendship with Quintus Lutatius Catulus, consul in 102 BC, is attested by Cicero (Brutus, ch. 35).

The 2nd-century Roman author Aulus Gellius defends his neologisms against the critic Caesellius Vindex.

The 5th-century historian Macrobius quotes several lines of Furius's work which would be copied by Virgil.

== Editions ==
- Willy Morel, Fragmenta poetarum latinorum epicorum et lyricorum praeter Ennium et Lucilium, Leipzig, Teubner, 1927. (New ed. Leipzig 1995.)
- Furius Antias (Aulus Furius Antias) [fragmenta in aliis scriptis seruata]; Bibliotheca Teubneriana Latina.
