= Shalihotra =

Ancient Indian veterinarian

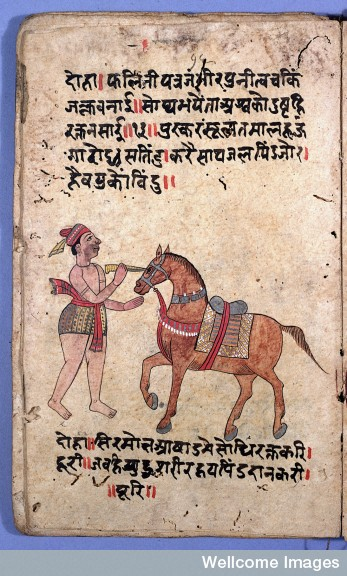
- Page from an 18th-century manuscript of Shalihotra Samhita, showing an eye operation on a horse.
- Discipline: Veterinary medicine
- Language: Classical Sanskrit

Publication details
- History: 3rd century BCE

Standard abbreviations
- ISO 4: Shalihotra

Shalihotra was a veterinarian and writer. His work, the Shalihotra Samhita, is an early Indian treatise on veterinary medicine (hippiatrics), likely composed in the 3rd century BCE.

Shalihotra was the son of a sage named Hayagosha. He is considered as the founder of veterinary sciences in Indian tradition. He is said to have lived in Sravasti (modern Sahet-Mahet on the borders of Gonda and Bahraich districts in Uttar Pradesh).

== Text ==
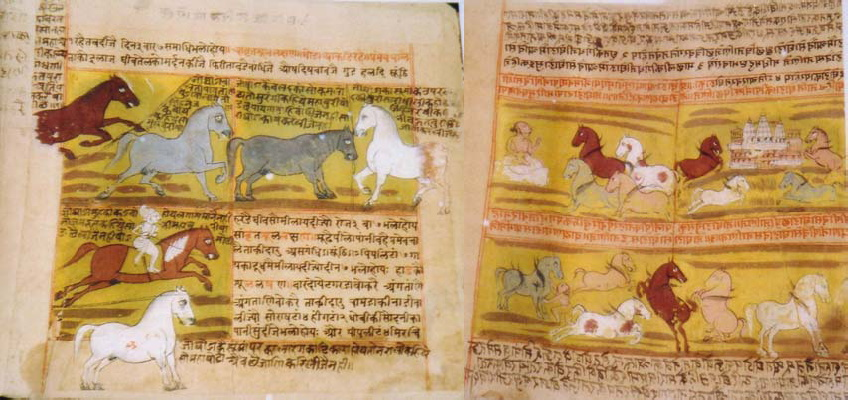
Pages of a copy of the Shalihotra from Rajasthan.

Shalihotra's principal work was a large treatise on the care and management of horses, the Shalihotra Samhita (encyclopedia of the physician Shalihotra) having some 12,000 shlokas in Sanskrit. It has been translated into Iranian, Arabic, Tibetan and English and all languages. This work described horse and elephant anatomy, physiology, surgery and diseases with their curative and preventive measures. It elaborated on the body structures of different races of horses, and identified the structural details by which one can determine the age of a horse. Two other works, namely Asva-prashnsa and Asva-lakshana sastram are also attributed to Shalihotra.

Some of the later authors have named their veterinary works after Shalihotra and others have based their work on his Samhita. Subsequent generations copied, revised and added to Shalihotra's text. one of these later texts is shown in the illustration above. Hence, the term "Shalihotra" refers to similar texts in a tradition. Muni Palkapya wrote Hasti Ayurveda, covering all aspects of elephant medicine. This book has four sections and 152 chapters, including the anatomy of elephants. During Mahabharata period, Nakula, author of the Ashva-chikitsa, was considered an equine expert, while Sahadeva was a specialist in cattle management.

Horses and elephants were vital assets in the never-ending warfare of the ancient world. Physicians treating human beings were also trained in the care of animals. Ancient Indian medical treatises such as those of Charaka, Sushruta and Harita contain chapters or references about the care of diseased, as well as healthy animals.

== Author ==
Shalihotra and the sage Agnivesha are pupils of the same teacher; according to tradition, Bharadvaja's Ayurveda, the science of life, was first presented in text form by Agnivesha, in his book Agnivesha Tantra and later by Charaka (Charaka Samhita, encyclopedia of the physician Charaka). Others say the great surgeon Sushruta, author of Sushruta Samhita (encyclopedia of the physician Sushruta), is Shalihotra's ally.

== See also ==
- Ayurveda
- History of veterinary medicine
- Hippiatrica
- History of the horse in South Asia

== Literature ==
- Apte, M. S. "Selected articles from Salihotra's Asvasastra." Indian veterinary journal 15 (1938): 415-420.
- Froehner, R. "Salihotra." Veterinärhistorische Mitteilungen 2, no. 1 (1922): 1-2.
