= Alas That My Lot Was Not Cast =

Ancient Chinese poem

"Alas That My Lot Was Not Cast" or "Ai shi ming" (traditional Chinese: 哀時命; simplified Chinese: 哀时命; pinyin: Āi shí mìng; lit. 'Lamenting this Season of Fate') is one of the poems anthologized in the ancient Chinese poetry collection, the Chu ci; which, together with the Shijing comprise the two major textual sources for ancient Chinese poetry. "Alas That My Lot Was Not Cast" is an example of the Sao type of Chu ci poetry, in the "O tempora o mores!" vein. The authorship of the "Alas That My Lot Was Not Cast" poem has been attributed to Zhuang Ji (also known as Yan Ji).

== See also ==
- Chuci
- List of Chuci contents
- Qu Yuan
- Weak River (mythology)
- Xian (Taoism)
- Zhuang Ji
- 惜誓
