= Sima Xiangru =

Chinese musician, poet, and politician (c. 179–117 BC)

- Born: 179 BC; Nanchong, Western Han
- Died: 117 BC
- Occupations: Musician, poet, politician

Sima Xiangru
- Traditional Chinese: 司馬相如
- Simplified Chinese: 司马相如
Transcriptions
Standard Mandarin
- Hanyu Pinyin: Sīmǎ Xiāngrú
- Wade–Giles: Ssŭ^{1}-ma^{3} Hsiang^{1}-ju^{2}
- IPA: [sɹ̩́.mà ɕjáŋ.ɻǔ]
Wu
- Romanization: Sy-mo Sian-zyu
Yue: Cantonese
- Yale Romanization: Sīmàah Sēungyùh
- Jyutping: Si^{1}-maa^{4} Soeng^{1}-jyu^{4}
- IPA: [si˥.ma˩˧ sœŋ˥.jy˩]
Southern Min
- Tâi-lô: Su-má Siong-jû
Middle Chinese
- Middle Chinese: Si-má Sjang-nyo
Old Chinese
- Baxter–Sagart (2014): *s-lə mˤraʔ [s]ang na

Sima Xiangru (pronounced [sɹ̩́mà ɕjáŋɻǔ], c. 179 – 117 BC), originally named Sima Quanzi (Chinese: 司馬犬子), courtesy name Zhangqing (長卿), was a Chinese musician, poet, and politician of the Western Han dynasty. Sima is a significant figure in the history of Classical Chinese poetry, and is generally regarded as the greatest of all composers of Chinese fu rhapsodies. His poetry includes his invention or at least development of the fu form, applying new metrical rhythms to the lines of poetry, which he mixed with lines of prose, and provided with several of what would in ensuing centuries become among a group of common set topics for this genre. Sima Xiangru was also versatile enough to write in the Chu ci style, while it was enjoying a renaissance, and he also wrote lyrics in what would become known as the yuefu formal style.

== Early life and career ==
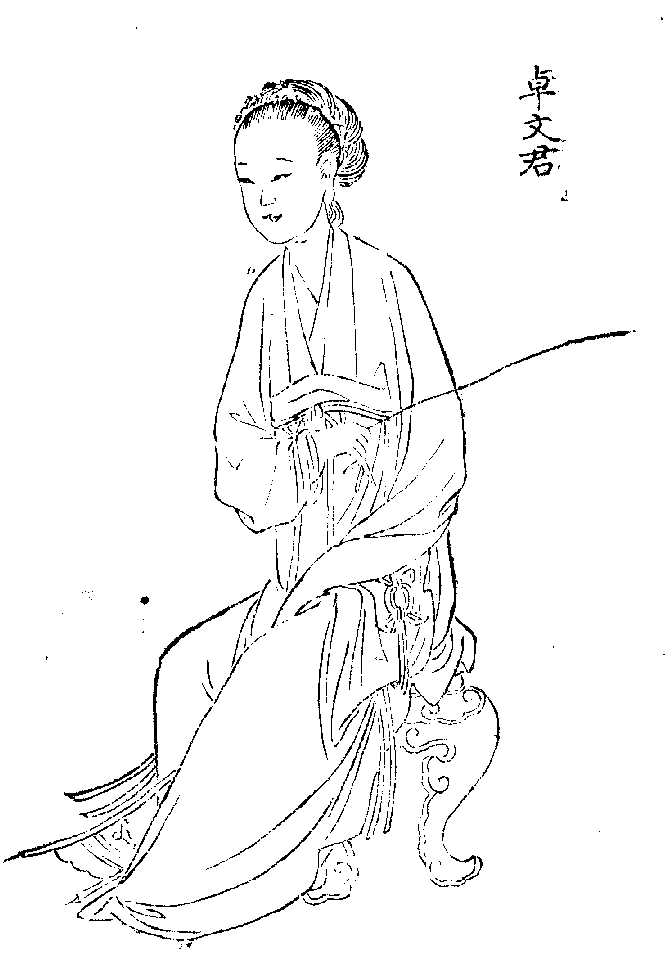
Sima's Sichuan wife, Zhuo Wenjun, his "love at first sight", (as imagined in 18th-century illustration)

Sima Xiangru was born in the commandery of Shu (now Sichuan Province) in the early 2nd century BC. He probably was born in 179 BC, but some sources give it variously as 172, 171, or 169 BC. Most sources agree that he was born in Chengdu, although the 19th-century scholar Wang Peixun proposed he may actually have been from Pengzhou (modern Peng'an County).

Little is known of Sima's family and ancestry. His family may have been descended from Sima Cuo (司馬錯; fl. 316–280 BC), a Qin general who led Qin's invasion of Shu in the late 4th century BC. During his youth he is said to have been a studious child who read widely, and to have been a lover of swordsmanship. As a youth, Sima took the name "Xiangru" out of admiration for the Warring States period leader Lin Xiangru.

Around 150 BC, while in his twenties, Sima left his home in Shu and traveled to the imperial capital Chang'an. He received a court appointment "by virtue of property", which means he had at least 40,000 copper cash. He was made a mounted military attendant to Emperor Jing of Han, which was a low-ranking position but allowed Sima to accompany the emperor and the court on imperial excursions. Sima does not seem to have enjoyed this position, likely because Emperor Jing, and his mostly Legalist advisors, were known for their dislike of literary embellishment.

In 149 BC, Sima moved to Liang (modern northern Anhui, southern Shandong, northeastern Henan, centered around modern Shangqiu city) to become a guest scholar at the court of Liu Wu, Prince of Liang, Emperor Jing's younger brother. The prince's court already held a number of prominent literary men of the era, including Mei Sheng (枚乘; d. 141 BC), Zou Yang (鄒陽; fl. 150 BC), and Zhuang Ji. During this period, Sima began composition of his "Fu on Sir Vacuous" (Zixu fu 子虛賦), which later became the first half of his famous fu on the Shanglin imperial hunting park.

Sima stayed in Liang until Prince Liu Wu's death in 143 BC, after which he returned to his home area of Shu. Sima no longer had any money, and he lived in a state of near poverty after returning home. His fortunes improved when he was taken on as a protégé of Wang Ji, the magistrate of Linqiong (modern Qionglai, Sichuan). Wang introduced Sima to Zhuo Wangsun (卓王孫; fl. 140 BC), a wealthy iron manufacturer, and Sima immediately fell in love with Zhuo's recently widowed daughter Zhuo Wenjun. In 142 BC, the following year, Sima and Zhuo Wenjun eloped together. Sima's biography states that the couple supported themselves by running an ale shop until Zhuo's father was forced by public shame into recognizing their marriage, giving the couple 1,000,000 copper cash, 100 servants, and valuables from the dowry of Zhuo's first marriage.

== Imperial career ==
In 137 BC, the young Emperor Wu of Han summoned Sima to Chang'an. The traditional account of this incident states that the emperor happened across a copy of Sima's "Fu of Sir Vacuous", and was so impressed by it that he exclaimed, "Why do I not have the privilege of being this man's contemporary?!" The account states that Yang Deyi, the keeper of the imperial hounds and a native of Shu, happened to overhear the emperor's exclamation, and informed him that Sima was the piece's author, whereupon Emperor Wu immediately had Sima summoned to the imperial capital. Notwithstanding its liveliness and charm, modern scholars have noted a number of logical inconsistencies in this traditional account, and do not consider it to be accurate.

In the subsequent, more credible portion of the story, Sima appeared before Emperor Wu and stated that he wished to compose a grand fu on the emperor's excursions and hunts. The emperor had the chief steward of writing give Sima a supply of brushes and bamboo slips (Note: Paper would not be invented for another 250 years.) which Sima used to compose his magnum opus, a fu on the imperial hunting reserve usually entitled "Fu on the Shanglin Park" (Shanglin fu 上林賦), though its original title was probably "Fu on the Excursions and Hunts of the Son of Heaven" (Tianzi youlie fu 天子遊獵賦). The emperor was so pleased with Sima's composition that he immediately appointed him to a position at the imperial court.

Sima served Emperor Wu by composing fu for special court occasions, though none of these have survived to modern times. Because of Sima's background in the Shu area, the emperor made him his personal envoy to what was then the southwestern frontier of China, of which Shu was a part. Around 131 BC, Sima traveled to Shu on an imperial mission to mediate a dispute between the local population and the area's oppressive governor, after which the emperor promoted him to General of the Gentlemen of the Household (zhonglang jiang 中郎將), a fairly high-ranking position at the imperial court. Sometime later, Sima was accused of taking bribes while on the mission, and was summarily dismissed from his position. Although he continued to enjoy the emperor's favor, and was brought back to court after several years, he never again served in a high-ranking position, and seems to have largely lost interest in court affairs.

During Sima's brief tenure as General of the Gentlemen of the Household, Emperor Wu dispatched him back to Shu to oversee a roadbuilding project in the southwest. Upon arriving with his large entourage from the capital, Sima was proudly greeted by his father-in-law Zhuo Wangsun, who decided to bequeath to Zhuo Wenjun a large portion of his estate, equal to that of a son's. This generous inheritance made Sima and his wife independently wealthy, so that after Sima was dismissed from his post around 130 BC, he had no need for further employment.

== Later life ==
Between 130 and 120 BC, Sima's primary activities were writing poetry and occasionally accompanying Emperor Wu on imperial outings. Around 120 BC, Sima accepted an appointment as director of Emperor Wen of Han's funerary park, though the position was probably a sinecure. Around 119 BC, Sima resigned this position due to increasing illness (likely diabetes), and retired to Maoling, a town where Emperor Wu had members of wealthy and influential families live so he could surveil them. In 117 BC, word reached the imperial court that Sima was dying, and Emperor Wu dispatched an official to visit his home and collect his writings to preserve them. However, by the time the official reached Sima's mansion, he had already died, aged approximately 62.

== Works ==
The "Monograph on Art and Literature" (Yiwenzhi 藝文志) from the Book of Han (Han Shu 漢書) lists 29 fu by Sima Xiangru, but only six complete fu and a fragment of another have survived to modern times, and two of the six surviving fu are of disputed authenticity among modern scholars. None of his poetical, non-fu works are listed. A dictionary entitled Fan jiang (凡將) is also listed among Sima's works, but only five fragments of it have survived.

The 5th-century anthology Selections of Refined Literature (Wen xuan 文選) preserves three of Sima's fu, as well as four non-fu pieces: his "Proclamation on Ba and Shu" (Yu Ba Shu xi 喻巴蜀檄), "Refuting the Elders of Shu" (Nan Shu fulao 難蜀父老), "Letter Admonishing Against Hunting" (Jian lie shu 諫獵書), and "Essay on the Feng and Shan Sacrifices" (Feng Shan wen 封禪文).

A volume of Sima's collected works appears in the bibliography catalogs of the dynastic histories of the Sui and Tang dynasties, but it seems to have been lost during the Song dynasty. Modern versions of it are Qing dynasty reconstructions pieced together from quotations in other works.

== Influence ==
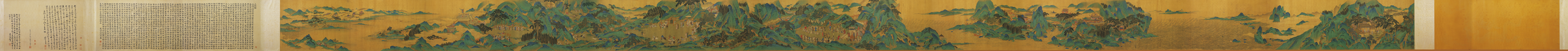
Shanglin Park, a painting inspired by Sima Xiangru's famous rhapsody "Fu on Shanglin Park". Attributed to Qiu Ying (c. 1494-1552), Ming dynasty, Handscroll, ink and colors on silk, 53.5 x 1183.9 cm. The scroll is meant to read right to left.

Besides being an important poet of the Han dynasty, Sima Xiangru has also influenced later art and artists.

== See also ==
- Fu
- Han poetry, a general article on poetry associated with the main time-frame of this dynastic era
- Science and technology of the Han dynasty, regarding gimbals in Chinese architecture
- Zhuang Ji
