= Siddhasenadivākarasuri =

Indian Jain monk

Ācārya Śrī Siddhasenadivākarasuri
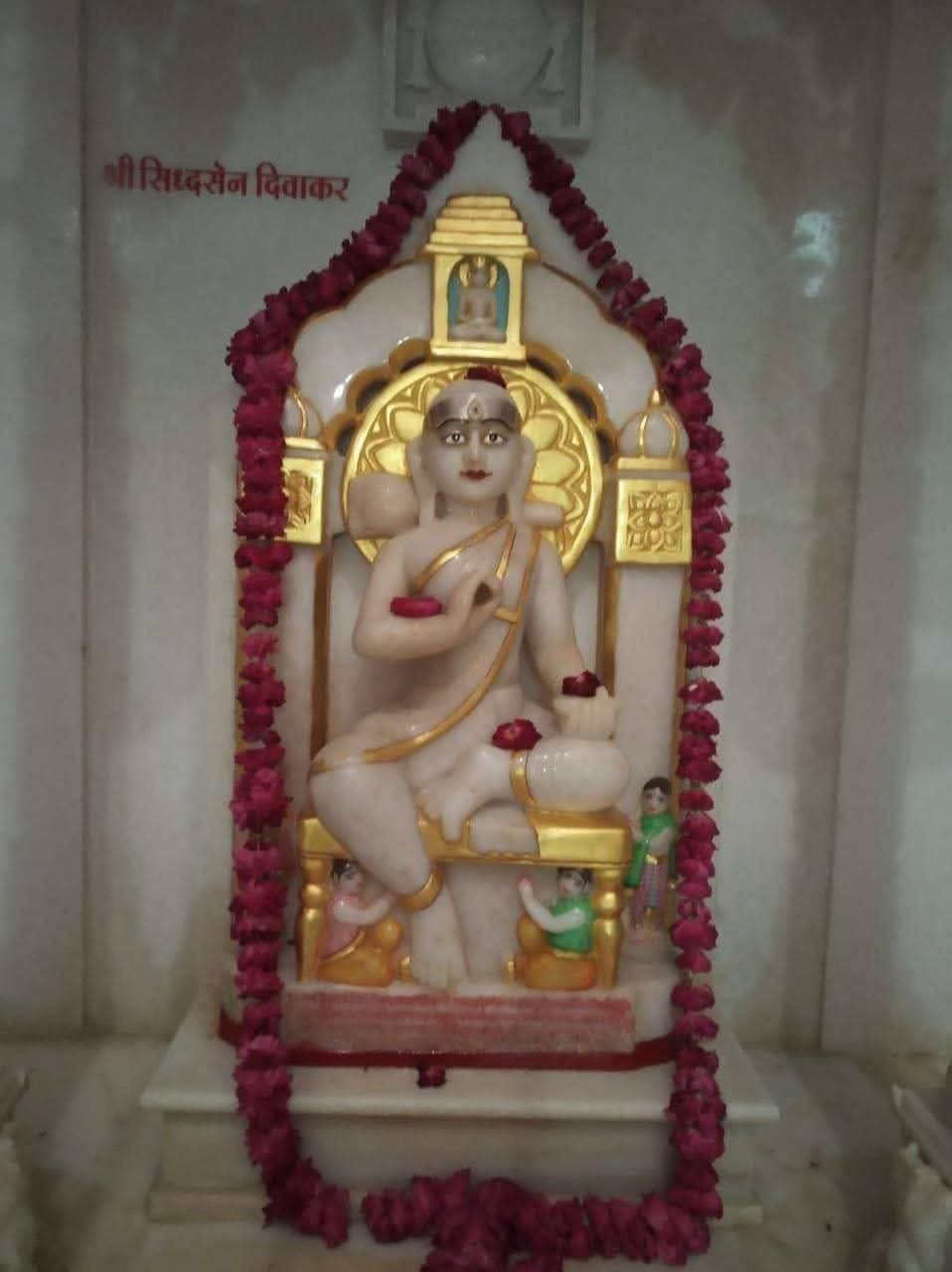
- An idol of Acharya Siddhasenadivākarasuri at a Śvetāmbara Jain temple in Ujjain, Madhya Pradesh

Personal life
- Born: 5th century CE
- Died: 5th century CE
- Notable work(s): Nyāyāvatāra, Kalyanmandir, Vardhman Shakrastav

Religious life
- Religion: Jainism
- Sect: Śvetāmbara
- Initiation: by Acharya Vruddhavadisuri

Siddhasenadivākarasuri (Jain Prakrit: सिद्धसेनदिवाकरसूरि) was a Jain monk of the Śvetāmbara sect in the fifth century CE who wrote works on Jain philosophy and epistemology. He was like the illuminator of the Jain order and therefore came to be known as Divākara, "Sun". He is credited with the authorship of many books, most of which are not available. Sanmatitarka ('The Logic of the True Doctrine') is the first major Jain work on logic written in Sanskrit. Among the most popular of his works, the Kalyan Mandir Stotra is a Sanskrit hymn dedicated to the 23rd Tirthankara Parshvanatha. It is one of the 9 holiest recitations (Nav Smaran) in the Śvetāmbara Murtipujak sect of Jainism.

Two references to Siddhasena's Sanmati Tarka and one reference of Siddhasena himself are found in Jinadāsagaṇī Mahattarā's cūrṇi which is believed to have had been written in 676 CE. Therefore, according to Pandit Bechardas Doshi and Pandit Sukhlal Sanghvi's translation of Sanmati Tarka, Siddhasena Divakarasuri was a Śvetāmbara ascetic in the 5th century CE.

== Life ==
Siddhasenadivākarasuri is said to have lived in fourth or fifth century CE and is said to have flourished in the Gupta Empire. He was a Brahmin by birth and a scholar. He was initiated by Acharya Vṛddhavadisuri. His name at birth was Kumudchandra. He was a proud Brahmin. However, when he lost a debate to Acharya Vruddhavadisuri, he accepted initiation into the Jain sangha. He came to be known as Acharya Siddhasensuri or Acharya Siddhasenadivākarasuri after he was given the position of an acharya. He is one of the most revered Acharyas of the Śvetāmbara sect.

According to the tradition, Siddhasenadivākarasuri once planned to translate all the Jaina works from prakrit to Sanskrit. He was asked by his master to visit all the Jain temples as a punishment. He thus visited the Jain temples for twelve years. He then came upon a Linga temple in Ujjain. He slept at the temple with his feet towards the Linga, which is a symbol of Shiva. King Vikramaditya had him beaten for the sin on request of the devotees. However, with miraculous powers, Siddhasenadivākarasuri made that the King's wife receive the beating instead of him, looking at his miraculous powers he was then set free. King Vikramaditya requested Siddhasenadivākarasuri not to sleep in front of the Linga and should start worshipping him, Siddhasenadivākarasuri replied to the king's request stating that the Linga would not be able to handle his devotion and bhakti, thus he then started to praise the lord by residing his composition "The Kalyan Mandir Stotra" as he reached the 11th verse, the sky rumbled, the temple bells started ringing and the Linga opened thus emerging the idol of Avanti Parshwanath from within. This idol is worshipped by the Śvetāmbara sect and it is one of the 108 most revered images of the 23rd Tirtankara Parshvanatha as worshipped by the Śvetāmbara Murtipujak sect. It is believed that the idol of Avanti Parshvanath was created and worshipped by Mahakala himself.

He is said to have spent the rest of his life in the vicinity of Bharuch in Gujarat.

== Thought ==
Siddhasena's main contribution in the Sanmatitarka is his analysis of the Jaina theory of Anekantavada. According to Jeffery Long, Siddhasena divides the seven classical Jain nayas (standpoints, viewpoints) into two categories: "those which affirm the substantiality of existence (dravyāstikanayas) and those which affirm the impermanent, changing aspects of existence (paryāyāstikanayas)." This view sees the best account of reality as one which includes permanence and impermanence, identity and difference in a complex set of contradictory relations. Siddhasena also argued that the number of possible nayas or viewpoints of reality is potentially limitless. He then goes on to correlate each of the nayas with the positions of Indian philosophical schools, showing how each view is not only partial but also one sided.

== Works ==
He is credited with authorship of -

- Sanmati-tarka-prakaraṇa - Prākṛta work on logic consisting of 167 verses divided into 3 kāṇḍas..
- Nyāyāvatāra - One of the first Jaina works on Nyāya in Saṃskṛta
- Kalyāṇa-mandira-stotra - 44-versed praise to 23rd Jaina Tīrthaṅkara Pārśvanātha.
- Dvātriṃśad Dvātriṃśikā - Thirty-two-versed compositions in Saṃskṛta. Out of 32 he authored, only 21 are available today.
- Gandhahastivivaraṇa on 1st adhyayana on ācārāgasūtra (not available)
- Gandhahastimahābhāṣya on Tattvārthādhigamasūtra (not available)

== Commentaries on his works ==
Lāvaṇyasūri has composed a Saṁskṛta commentary - Kiraṇāvalī on his 21 of 32 Dvātriṁśikā-s available today.

A Sanskrit commentary called Tattvabodhavidhāyinī is composed upon his Sanmatitarka by Abhaydevsuri and is edited in modern scholarship.

A modern Gujarati commentary titled Śakrastava: Paramno Shakshātkār has been written by Acharya Yashovijaysuri, offering a devotional and philosophical interpretation of the Śakrastava, traditionally attributed to Siddhasena Divākara. The work presents the hymn not merely as a liturgical composition but as a contemplative text, explaining the spiritual meanings of the epithets used for the Arihanta and relating them to inner experience, meditation, and devotional practice within the Jain bhakti tradition. The commentary combines scriptural references, philosophical reflection, and experiential exposition, aiming to make the devotional and contemplative dimensions of the Śakrastava accessible to contemporary readers while preserving its traditional theological framework.

== See also ==
- Mānatuṅga
- Hemacandra
- Devarddhigaṇi Kṣamāśrama
- Yaśovijaya
