= Xijing Zaji =

Ancient Chinese short story collection

Title text of Xijing Zaji from a printed edition from the Guangxu era

The Xijing Zaji (traditional Chinese: 西京雜記; simplified Chinese: 西京杂记), translated into English as Miscellaneous Records of the Western Capital, is an ancient Chinese collection of short stories. The collection, which is of uncertain authorship, includes 129 stories that mostly takes place in Chang'an, capital of the Western Han dynasty. Although the stories within the collection supposedly dates back to the late Western Han, most modern scholars consider the collection a later work, no earlier than the 3rd century (with Ge Hong being named as its compiler or one of its main editors), with stories being added during the 4th century and later.

Cover of a Ming dynasty printed edition of Xijing Zaji

Pages from a printed edition of Xijing Zaji

== Editions and translations ==
- The Chinese original in Wikisource
- Parallel Chinese original and English translation by Julie Sullivan
- Pimpaneau, Jacques. 2016. Notes diverses sur la capitale de l'ouest. Paris: Les Belles-Lettres.
