= Dialogue between a Man and His God =

Piece of Wisdom Literature from Old Babylonian period

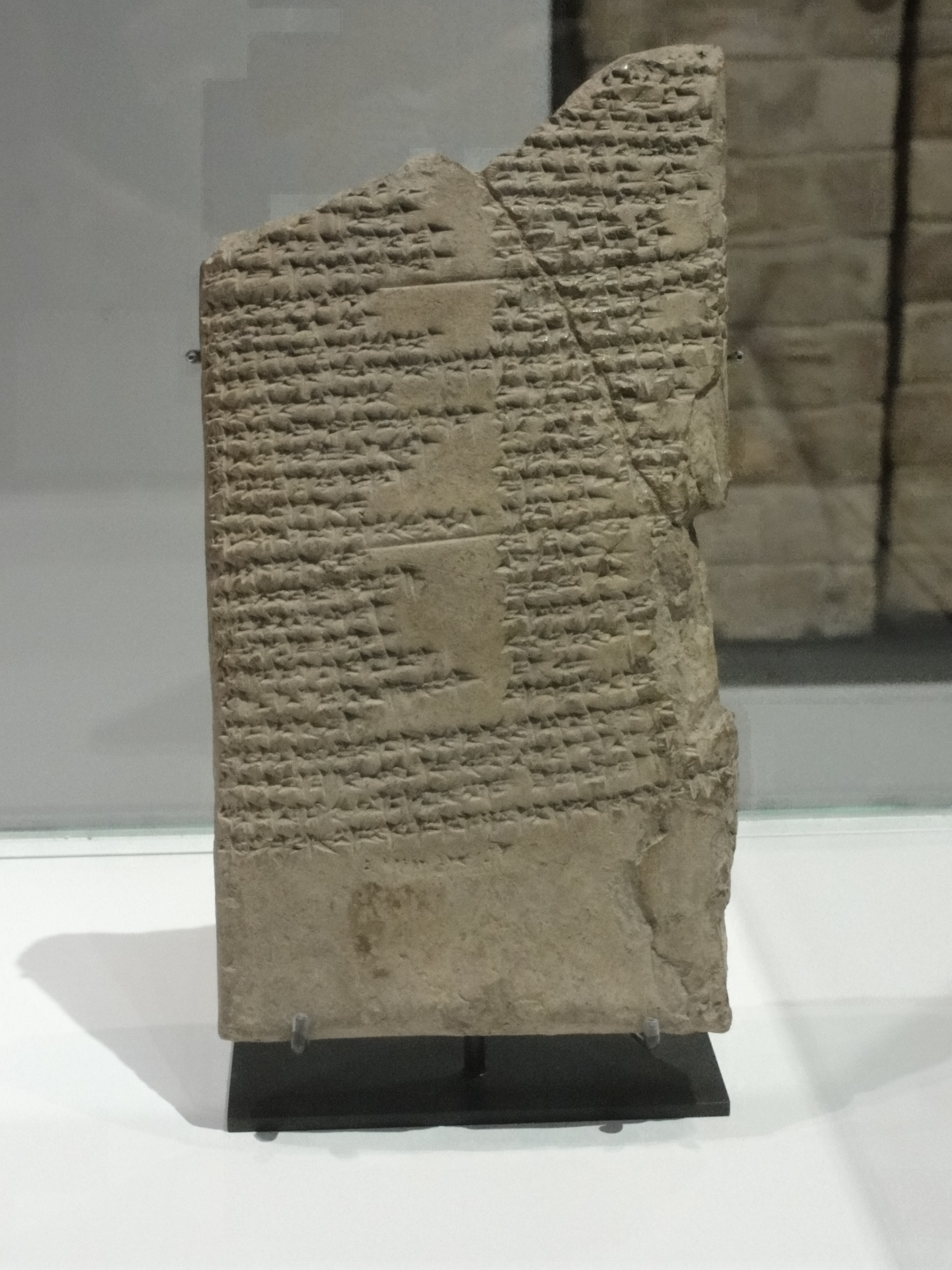
- Tablet AO 4462 of the “Dialogue between a Man and His God”
- Height: 11.5 cm
- Width: 6.8 cm
- Created: c. 1664 BC
- Discovered: before 1906; Baghdad, Baghdad Governorate, Iraq
- Present location: Paris, Ile-de-France, France
- Language: Akkadian

The Dialogue between a Man and His God is the earliest known text to address the answer to the question of why a god permits evil, or theodicy, a reflection on human suffering. It is a piece of Wisdom Literature extant on a single clay cuneiform tablet written in Akkadian and attributed to Kalbanum, on the last line, an individual otherwise unknown. It is dated to the latter part of the Old Babylonian period, around the reign of Ammi-Ditana (reigned 1683–1640s BC) according to Lambert, and is currently housed in the Louvre Museum, accession number AO 4462. It is of unknown provenance as it was purchased from an antiquities dealer by the Museum in 1906. It shares much of its style with an earlier Sumerian work, “Man and His God”, a penitential prayer of the Ur III period.

== The text ==
With sixty-nine lines arranged in ten strophes, each separated by a horizontal line, the work is structured around a dialogue between two people, one of whom has lost favor with both his lord and his personal god, resulting in his intense suffering from an undisclosed illness. The text is difficult and fragmentary, especially in the middle leading to debate among scholars about its meaning and purpose. The opening line has been rendered as “a man weeps for a friend to his god” or, alternatively, “a young man was imploring his god as a friend”.

He protests his innocence, “the wrong I did I do not know!”, and holds his god responsible for his condition. He continues his lament and cries for deliverance in a sufferer's prayer. At the end, the text switches to a third-person narrator who relates the man's pleas did not go unheeded and that his god responded to his entreaties with his deliverance from his afflictions, with the proviso “you must never till the end of time forget [your] god”, a “happy ending” framing device which also appears in other works of this genre.

=== Translation ===
Line	Akkadian (romanized)	English translation
First strophe
1	et,-lu-um ru-i-isz a-na i-li-szu i-ba-ak-ki u_{2}-te-ne-en-ne-en iq-[bi^{?} …] szu	A young man was weeping to his god like a friend, constantly praying, he [...] his [...]
2	ha-mi-it, li-ib-bu-usz du-ul-la-szu ma-ru-is,^{!?}-ma	His heart was aflame, his toil grim.
3	i-ta-a'-da-ar ka-ba-at-ta-szu i-ni-in-hi	His liver was grieving from its suffering.
4	i-ni-isz-ma ik-ta-mi-us i-pa-al-si_{20}-ih	He is bent over in suffering; he is prostrate.
5	ik-pi_{2}-us,^{!?}-ma um-ma du-ul-la-szu ba-ka-i-isz iq-ra-ab	His toil has become too heavy for him, he has drawn near to weep.
6	ki-ma bu-ri-im pa-ar-si-im ša i-me-ri i-na-ag-ga-ag	He brays like the weaned foal of a donkey,
7	iš-ta-pu ma-ha-ar i-li-[im] reši-[…]-šu	He has got loud in the god's presence, his chief,
8	ri-mu-um pu-šu-u_{2} la-al-la-ra-ma ri-gi-im-[š]	A bull is his speech, [his] voice two lamenters,
9	be-li-iš-šu qu_{2}-ba-am ub-ba-la ša-ap-ta-aš-[šu]	His lips bear a lament to his lord.
Second strophe
10	be-li-iš-šu du-ul-li ih-bu-tu i-ma-an-nu	He recounts to his lord the toil he has gone through,
11	in-hu i-na-hu-u_{2} i-pa-aš-ša-ar et,-lu-um	The man explains the suffering he is enduring:
12	be-li-am-ta-al-ka-am-ma i-na ka-ba-at-ti-ia	"My lord, I have reflected within my reins,
13	[…] i li-ib-bim še-et, i-pu-šu la i-di	[...] in [my] heart. I do not know what sin I have committed.
14	[…] an-zi-il-la-ka a-na-ku ik-ki-ba-am le-em-na-ma am-ma-[…] ar	Have I [eaten] a very evil forbidden fruit?
15	u_{2}-ul da-[a]-gi-il a-hu [a]-hi-iš-šu ka-ar-s,i_{2} ib-ri-im ib-ra-šu la a-ki-il	Does brother look down on brother?
16	u_{2}-ul […] an-ni […] na šu ša-ap-li-ka be-lu bi-it ri-a-ši-im	[...] has not [...] me, [...] beneath you, the lord of the house of rejoicing [...]
Third strophe
17	ši-mi-[…] pi […] ra-na-ba-iz-za be-lu mi-ša-ri mu-[ši^{?-im?}]	[...] there is present for me the lord of justice who decrees [...]
18	[…] i […] am-ma li-ib-ba-šu na-as-qu_{2}-um li	[...] may his choice intelligence [...]
19	[…] i […] ra-ma-an-šu us,-s,u_{2}-ra a-na	[...] to guard himself for [...]
20	[…] tu […]-ni-tu-a ti-ib-ta	[...] my [...]
21	[…]-še ša ku-[… tu]-ul-li-da-an-ni u_{3} be-[…]	[...] [you] begot me and [...]
Fourth strophe
22	[...] x-ar a-ta-szu-x [...]	[...] I got distressed [...]
23	[...] ki-ma sza x pa?-[...] ri-sze-pi_{2} x...	[...] like/when [...]
24	UR? x iq-ta-ti ka-ba-at-ti szi? ma x […] da?-ar U_{4}-mi-ia	my spirit came to an end, [...] of my days.
25	[isz-tu s,]e-eh,_{2}-re-ku a-di ra-bi-ya-ku ur-ri im-ma-ti mu-[…]	[From] my childhood to my maturity, the days have lengthened
26	[im-ma]-ti ma-la tu-da-mi-qa_{2}-an-ni-ma ma-la tur-tab-ba […] la am-szi	?
Fifth strophe
27	i-na x du-um-qi_{2} tu-ka-al-li-ma lu-um-na be-li-ma x tu-sza-an-me-er iq-[qi_{2}]-ib-bi	In [...] of grace you have shown me evil, my lord, you have caused [...] it will be said.
28	ru-ub-bu mu-usz-qi_{2} sze-pi_{2}-isz wa-ta-ti-ma me-eh,_{2}-s,e-tim […] ma-h,i-ia	My misfortune has increased, it attaches itself to [my] feet, [it has inflicted] blows upon me.
29	pi_{2}ya-am-ma at-ta tu-ma-ar-ri-ra-am da-an-ni-isz […] x-tu-szu i-wi da-da-ar-szu	You are making the mouth (filled with food) bitter to me, its [...] ha become like stinkwort.
30	[…] tu-ur_{2}-ri-x ta-ad-lu-uh,-ma-mi pi_{2}-isz-ri […]-wi-ir isz-tu s,e_{2}-eh,-re-ku	You have [...], you have muddied the water, [...] since my childhood.
31	[…] x-le-et sza-di-i asz-x-mu lu-u_{2} mu-ri-da la i-szu-ni	[...] the side of the mountain, [...] the ascent has no descent.
Sixth strophe
32	[…] x ta-ka-qa_{2}-ar-szu tu-szu-mi-da sze-pi_{2}-ia	[...] You have set my feet on the earth.
33	[…] x-asz-szi-sza-e-li tu-sza-az-ni-in a-ta	[...] you have made to bear, you have made my [...] care for me.
34	[…] tu-sza-am-li	[...] you have filled up.
35	[…] pi_{2}-sza-tim ta-ag-ru-un	[...] you have heaped up.
36	[…] bi-ti-ia a-bi mu-ti ki-im-ti-ia	[...] of my house, my father, the man of my clan.
37	[… wa?]-ar-di-szu	[...] of his slave.
38	[…] x-szu	[...] his [...]"
Seventh strophe
39	[…]	[...]
40	[…] x-ar-ki-isz	?
41	[…] x-ra-ah,-ku	?
42	[…] x-ar-szu tu-ma-i-szu	[...] him [...] his [...]
43	[…] x-szu-li-wa-szu ka-qa2-ar-szu	[...], he raised him to the earth.
44	[…] ta-x […] sza-ma-an a-si-im	[...] with a physician's oil.
45	[…] a-ak-la u_{3} li-bi-us-su_{2} ik-tu-um	[...], he [gave] food and his garments.
46	[…] x-s,u_{2}-um-ma li-ib-ba-su_{2} u_{2}-sza/ta?-an-me-er	[...], he cheered his spirit.
47	i-ta-u_{2}-szu ta-ap-sze-h,a-at t,u_{2}-ub szi-ri-szu	and spoke to him of the relief his good health (would bring)."
Eighth strophe
48	ši-ib-bu-uk e-de-el li-ib-bu-uk la i-le-em-mi-in	"Gird your loins, do not be dispirited,
49	ga-am-ra ša-na-tu u_{4}-mu ša am-la-u_{2}-ni du-ul-la	the years are finished, the days I filled with toil.
50	šu-um-ma-ma-an la qa_{2}-bi-ya-at a-na ba-la-t,i-im	If you had not been ordained to life,
51	ki-ma-ma-an te-le-'i di-ya-am ka-ab-ta ku-ul-la-ti-iš-šu ta-aš-du-ud	how possibly could you have suffered the severe malady to its end?
52	ta-mu-ur pu-usz-qa_{2}-am i-s,a-bi ka-li-ma	You experienced distress, but my [...] is withdrawn:
53	tu-usz-ta-ag-me-er-ma bi-il-ta-szu ka-bi-it-ta ta-asz-szi	You have borne its heavy load to its completion.
54	isz-ti-i-qu_{2}-uk pa-da-nu-um pe_{2}-ti-i-ku	People have [...]ed you, but [now] the way is open for you,
55	isz-ra-at-ku t,u_{2}-du-um u_{3} sza-ki-in-ku re-mu-um	Your path is straight and compassion is bestowed on you,
56	ah,-re-ti-isz u_{4}-mi la ta-ma-asz-szu-u_{2} il-ka	You who in future days will not forget [your] god,
57	ba-ni-ka ki ta-da-am-mi-qu_{2}-nim a-at-ta	Your creator, and that you are well favored.
Ninth strophe
58	a-na il-ka ba-nu-uk tu-ku-ul-tu-uk	I am your god, your creator, your help.
59	e-ru-kum ma-as,-s,a-ru-ia u_{3} da-an-nu-ku-[um]	My guards are watching over you with power for your [protection].
60	a-sza_{3} ma-ar-qi_{2}-us-su_{2} i-pe_{2}-et-ti-[ku-um]	I will open for you a place of refuge,
61	a-pa-al-la-asz-ku-um-ma da-ri-isz ba-la-t,a-[am]	eternal life I will provide for you.
62	u_{3} a-at-ta e-te-ep-s,i ub-bu-la-am pu-szu-usz	As for you, unblenchingly anoint the parched,
63	em-s,a szu-ki-il szi-qi_{2} s,a-mi-ia ma-mi	feed the hungry, give water to the thirsty to drink.
64	u_{3} sza usz-pu-ma isz-ta-ab-bu-ba i-[…]	But he who has cast sorceries, [whose] [...] have [...],
65	li-it,-t,u_{2}-ul ak-li-isz-ka li-zu-ub li-h,u-ur u_{3} li-ih,-[h,a-ra-mi-it,]	May he stare at your food as he melts, flows down and dis[solves].
66	pa-ti-ye-et-ku a-bu-ul szu-ul-mi-im u_{3} ba-la-t,i-im	For you the gate of prosperity and life is open,
67	mu-um-ma qe_{2}-er-bu-usz e-ru-ub s,i-i lu sza-al-ma-a-at	[...] go in and out of it and prosper."
Tenth strophe
68	szu-sze-er pa-da-nu-usz pe_{2}-te t,u_{2}-du-usz un-ne-en a-ar-di-ka li-ri-id a-na li-bi-ka	Make straight his way, open his path, may the prayer of your servant sink into your mind.
69	ka-al-ba-nu-um	Kalbanum

=== Primary publications ===
- Jean Nougayrol (1952). "Une version ancienne du "juste souffrant"". Revue Biblique. 59. pl. vii and viii (text)
- W. von Soden (1957). "Zum altbabylonischen Gedicht von schuldlos Leidenden". Orientalia - Nova Series (OrNS). 26: 315–319. (with collations)
- W. G. Lambert (1960). Babylonian Wisdom Literature. Clarendon Press. p. 10.
- W. von Soden (1965). "Das Fragen nach der Gerechtigkeit Gottes im Alten Orient". Mittheilungen der Deutschen Orient-Gesellschaft. 96: 46–48.
- W. G. Lambert (1987). "A Further Attempt at the Babylonian "Man and his God"". In Francesca Rochberg-Halton (ed.). Language, Literature, and History: Philological and Historical Studies Presented to Erica Reiner. American Oriental Society. pp. 187–202. edition, with collations
- W. von Soden (1990). "Weisheitstexte". In G. Burkard (ed.). Texte aus der Umwelt des Alten Testaments (TUAT) III/1. Gutersloher Verlaghaus. pp. 135–149. (translation)
- Benjamin R. Foster (2005). Before the Muses: An Anthology of Akkadian Literature. CDL Press. pp. 148–150.
