= Mixed School (Chinese philosophy) =

Eclectic school of thought

Zajia (Chinese: 雜家; pinyin: zájiā) or the Mixed School in Chinese philosophy was an eclectic school of thought that combined elements of Confucianism, Taoism, Mohism, and Legalism. Its texts include the Shizi (c. 330 BCE), Lüshi Chunqiu, and Huainanzi. Huainanzi translator John Major took the Lüshi Chunqiu and Huainanzi as forming an "encyclopedic" tradition together with the Guanzi and Shiji. Shen Dao was included in the eighteenth century.

== Za translation ==
The term Za 雜 is applied to several texts in the Hanshu's bibliographical catalogue. The Hanshu's bibliography is based on the text Seven Summaries (including that of Zajia), written by imperial librarian Liu Xin. Several school summaries were earlier written by Sima Tan.

As translated modernly, Za could mean "mixed", "combined", "eclectic", or "miscellaneous". Preceding translation, Mark Edward Lewis believed that the term Za indicated syncretist texts, but still translated it as "mixed" or "combined". The Lüshi Chunqiu's translators John Knoblox and Jeffrey Riegel (2001) considered a translation of "mixed school" accurate. While influential in earlier scholarship, they did not consider "eclectic", "syncretic" or "miscellaneous" accurate.

There was no school that called itself "syncretist school" or Zajia "za school". The term was moreover invented later than that of Daojia, later referring to classical "Daoism". Retrospectively, many early pre-Han dynasty texts could be described as mixed. The ancient Chinese do not pretend any of their bibliographical categories are strictly precise, separate, or uniform.

Shen Dao was included in the eighteenth century due to association with both Huang-Lao "Daoist" and "Legalist" traditions, as categorized in the Shiji and Hanshu respectively.

== Early interpretation ==
Eclecticism was the "first" interpretation of the school category and its texts dating back to early modern scholarship, popular in Chinese scholarship, e.g., by the early modern scholar Feng Youlan. A.C. Graham (1989) translated Zajia as "syncretists" late in early modern scholarship, which saw some use. But Graham also referred to some chapters in the Zhuangzi as syncretist.

Chinese scholar Liu Xiaogan disagreed with this usage, because he didn't consider "syncretism" a term from Chinese history. Such content was later traditionally described as Huang-Lao or "Yellow Emperor and Laozi (Daoism)", as used in the Records of the Grand Historian.

Knoblox and Riegel did not believe the term was intended to pejoratively label the works as "miscellaneous" as more commonly believed in earlier scholarship. Graham saw Liu Xin as writing school summaries for at least potentially useful texts, not just criticizing texts as "miscellaneous compilations".

Sinologist Goldin (2005) did not consider syncretism an accurate interpretation of the Huainanzi. The Huainanzi considers Confucianism and Mohism to have important ideas for a ruler. But it also has anti-Confucian and anti-Mohist positions.

== Post-translation interpretation ==
The Lüshi Chunqiu's translators John Knoblox and Jeffrey Riegel considered the Lüshi Chunqiu and Huainanzi to be more accurately understood within the context of early arguments about the relations between man, government, and the cosmos. While later termed as "mixed-school" texts, they would arguably have been understood this way anciently. As translated by Graham, while Liu Xin describes the texts as "combining" the different schools, he moreover praises Zajia for perceiving that "everything in royal government is interconnected", mainly criticizing them as lacking focus.

Leading up to the modern translation of the Huainanzi (2010), while influential in earlier scholarship, Sinologist Goldin (2005) rejected a syncretist interpretation of the Huainanzi as simply a "confluence of Confucianism, Daoism, and Legalism", favoring a authoritarian, ruler-centered interpretation. It represents an "amalgam of various philosophical schools" inasmuch they are included as source material. It considers people important as a basis for monarchism. It states that Confucius and Mozi have broad understanding, but are not always as useful as people who live in mountains, ride on horses, or navigate little boats.

Later included in the Daozang, or Daoist canon, the Huainanzi differs from Daoism as later understood. However, also earlier argued by Huainanzi translator John Major, it was still very influential in scholarship to interpret the Huainanzi within the context of the (Huang-Lao) Daoist tradition, albeit with differing understandings of Daoism. Centering scholarship surrounding the new translations, the Huainanzi's modern translators included it as a "third" remaining interpretation following eclecticism and the new scholarship.

== Daoism ==
While not lumped under Zajia, the Zhuangzi also includes what can be called an intellectual history, incorporating figures from the later-termed school of names. Sima Qian saw Zhuang Zhou, or the Zhuangzi, as "eclectic" in the sense that "there was nothing that his learning did not probe into." Sima's Lu Buwei Biography in the Shiji says that the Lushi chunqiu was compiled to provide a “complete account of Heaven and Earth, the myriad things, and the affairs of past and present."

At the center of the classical discourse was Dao the Way, or Method of doing, a concept containing fa or "norms, patterns, and methods", developing towards definitions, rules, and laws. While it would be an exaggeration to say that only Laozi and Zhuang Zhou are focused on Dao, the term Daoism is at least arguably descriptive of a focus on dao. Such focuses would describe Mozi, later included in the Daoist canon.

Syncretism marks the late Warring States period, characterizing what was later described as Huang-Lao, or (Yellow Emperor) Daoism as originally defined in the early Shiji. In these terms, Daoism, more specifically Huang-Lao, would theoretically describe the political and intellectual milieu continuing into the Qin and Han dynasties, becoming entangled with authoritarian Confucianism and Legalism. While the Shizi may not have formally made its way to the (Huang-Lao) Daoist category, it does contain an identical story on the Yellow Emperor to the Huangdi Sijing.

A.C. Graham used the term syncretism in older scholarship. Liu Xiaogan, as a traditional Chinese scholar, still prefers Huang-Lao or Yellow Emperor and Laozi (Daoism). While neither the terms "syncretism", "Daoism", or "Huang-Lao" existed in the Warring States period, there at at least three Yellow Emperor stories in the Zhuangzi treating him as a Daoist master, so that traditional terms like Huang-Lao are not based on nothing.

Seven chapters of the Zhuangzi draw on different schools and so could be called syncretic, but that is how Sima Tan (originally) defined Daoism. As used by the Confucians for the Lüshi Chunqiu and Huainanzi, Zajia syncretism splits off 'syncretic' texts that could otherwise be interpreted in relation to a concept of ('syncretic') political Daoism (Daojia) in the Shiji, including notable quantities of content that could be called Daoist. Their two texts can be understood as seeking to comprehensively incorporate, or syncretize, all knowledge of their time, a defining feature held in common with the Daoistic Shiji.

== Zajia ==
The term Zajia would theoretically transplant syncretism as an original defining feature of Daoism in the Shiji under a new categorical term. The division would theoretically enlarge the appearance of a discrete Confucianism by dividing and concretizing other categories, specifically Daoism. Sima Tan does the same when he names the schools to argue for the superiority of Daoism.

Liu Xin says in the Book of Han:

"Those of the Eclectic school had their origin in the Councillors. They drew both from the Confucianists and the Mohists, and harmonized the School of Names and the Legalists. They knew that the nation had need of each of these, and saw that kingly government should not fail to unite all. Herein lies the strong point of this school."

As it is known today, the Shizi does contain much Confucian material but differs from Han-state orthodox Confucianism. The description articulates a "syncretic" categorical term other than the categorical term "Daoism".

== Huainanzi ==
Several early chapters in the Huainanzi essentially present the worldview of early Han intellectuals, dominated by Lüshi Chunqiu content, though the broader Huainanzi is strongly influenced by the Daoist Zhuangzi and Laozi texts. Insisting on the value of trust over either law, rewards, or penalties, Griet Vankeerberghen considered the Confucianism of Gongsun Hong reminiscent of Huang-Lao ideology, like that of the Daoistic Huainanzi, the book of his opponents. Both are syncretistic; one is simply defined as Confucianism.

Though the Zhuangzi is taken as having been compiled in the late Warring States period, more specific anti-state doctrines in the Zhuangzi tended to quickly lose control of political discourse. The Huainanzi arguably uses Laozi and Zhuangzi more as founders of "themes" for its own religious political ideology, which characterizes Daoism in the Shiji. Possibly, the term Daoism (Daojia) was originally coined with the Laozi-Zhuangzi eclecticism of the Huainanzi in mind, or it is in those terms at least comparable to the definition of Daojia in the Shiji.

Though the Huainanzi came to be considered an important philosophical text, as texts later labeled "syncretist", they did not achieve the status of classics or other Confucian texts, becoming syncretist rather than Daoist. The Confucians gradually came to sometimes consider the Huainanzi a Daoist classic using Laozi and Zhuangzi, coming to be seen more specifically as "eclectic Daoist" and ultimately incorporated in the Daozang.

== Sources ==
- Chan, Shirley, ed. (2019). Dao Companion to the Excavated Guodian Bamboo Manuscripts. Dao Companions to Chinese Philosophy. Vol. 10. Cham: Springer. doi:10.1007/978-3-030-04633-0. ISBN 978-3-030-04632-3. OCLC 1055562095.
  - Chan, Shirley (2019b). "Introduction: The Excavated Guodian 郭店 Bamboo Manuscripts". In Chan, Shirley (ed.). Dao Companion to the Excavated Guodian Bamboo Manuscripts. Dao Companions to Chinese Philosophy. Vol. 10. Cham: Springer. pp. 1–17. doi:10.1007/978-3-030-04633-0. OCLC 1055562095.
- Cook, Scott (2021). The Use and Abuse of History in Early China: From Xun Zi to Lüshi chunqiu. Albany: State University of New York Press. ISBN 978-1-4384-8507-2.
- Fraser, Chris (2023). "Mohism". In Zalta, Edward N.; Nodelman, Uri (eds.). Stanford Encyclopedia of Philosophy (Fall 2023 ed.).
- Fischer, Paul (2012). Shizi: China's First Syncretist. New York Chichester, West Sussex: Columbia University Press. doi:10.7312/fisc15906. ISBN 9780231504171. OCLC 967258975.
- Goldin, Paul R. (2005a). "Insidious Syncretism in the Political Philosophy of Huainanzi". University of Hawai'i Press: 90–111.
- Goldin, Paul R. (2011). "Persistent Misconceptions about Chinese "Legalism"" (PDF). Journal of Chinese Philosophy. 38 (1): 88–104.
- Graham, A.C. (1989). Disputers of the Tao: Philosophical Argument in Ancient China. Open Court. ISBN 978-0-8126-9942-5.
- Hansen, Chad (2024). "Daoism". In Zalta, Edward N.; Nodelman, Uri (eds.). The Stanford Encyclopedia of Philosophy (Summer 2024 ed.). Metaphysics Research Lab, Stanford University.
- Hansen, Chad (1992). A Daoist Theory of Chinese Thought. Oxford: Oxford University Press. ISBN 978-0-19-535076-0.
- Hansen, Chad (2006). "Chinese Philosophy: Daoism". In Borchert, Donald M. (ed.). Encyclopedia of Philosophy. Vol. 2 (2nd ed.). Macmillan Reference USA. pp. 184–194.
- Jiang, Tao (2021). Origins of Moral-political Philosophy in Early China. Oxford: Oxford University Press. ISBN 978-0-19-760347-5.
- Klein, Esther (2010). "Were There "Inner Chapters" in the Warring States? A New Examination of Evidence about the Zhuangzi". T'oung Pao. 96 (4/5): 299–369. JSTOR 41354706.
- Knechtges, David R. (2014). "Shenzi 慎子". In Knechtges, David R.; Chang, Taiping (eds.). Ancient and Early Medieval Chinese Literature: A Reference Guide, Part Two. Leiden: Brill. pp. 871–874. ISBN 978-90-04-19240-9.
- Liu Xiaogan (1994). Classifying the Zhuangzi Chapters. Michigan Monographs in Chinese Studies, vol. 65. Ann Arbor: University of Michigan Press. doi:10.3998/mpub.19186. ISBN 9780472901340.
- Loewe, Michael (1999). The Cambridge History of Ancient China. Cambridge University Press. ISBN 978-0-521-47030-8.
- Major, John S. (1993). Heaven and Earth in Early Han Thought: Chapters Three, Four and Five of the Huainanzi. Albany: State University of New York Press.
- Major, John S. (2010). The Huainanzi: A Guide to the Theory and Practice of Government in Early Han China. Columbia University Press. ISBN 978-0-231-52085-0.
- Mou, Bo (2008). Routledge History of Chinese Philosophy. Taylor & Francis. ISBN 978-1-134-24937-4.
- O’Neill, R. (2025). "Publicness as Backdrop for the Shanghai Museum "Shenzi" Fragments". Dao. 24: 285–308. doi:10.1007/s11712-025-09990-x.
- Pines, Yuri (2023). "Legalism in Chinese Philosophy". In Zalta, Edward N.; Nodelman, Uri (eds.). Stanford Encyclopedia of Philosophy (Summer 2023 ed.).
  - Pines, Yuri (2023a), 1. Defining the fa Tradition, Stanford Encyclopedia of Philosophy
- Smith, Kidder (2003). "Sima Tan and the Invention of Daoism, "Legalism," et cetera". The Journal of Asian Studies. 62 (1): 129–156. doi:10.2307/3096138. JSTOR 3096138.
- Vankeerberghen, Griet (2001). The Huainanzi and Liu An's Claim to Moral Authority. Albany: State University of New York Press. ISBN 0-7914-5148-8.
- Yates, Robin D. S. (1997). Five Lost Classics: Tao, Huang-Lao, and Yin-Yang in Han China. Ballantine Books. ISBN 978-0345365385.
- Youlan, Feng (1976) [1948]. A Short History of Chinese Philosophy. Free Press. ISBN 978-0-684-83634-8.
