= Shizi (book) =

4th-century BCE Syncretic philosophy text

Chinese name
- Chinese: 尸子
- Literal meaning: [Writings of] Master Shi
Transcriptions
Standard Mandarin
- Hanyu Pinyin: Shīzǐ
- Wade–Giles: Shih-tzu
Yue: Cantonese
- Yale Romanization: Si^{1}ji^{2}

Korean name
- Hangul: 시자
Transcriptions
- Revised Romanization: Sija
- McCune–Reischauer: Sija

Japanese name
- Kanji: 尸子
- Hiragana: しし
Transcriptions
- Revised Hepburn: Shishi

The Shizi is an eclectic Chinese classic written by Shi Jiao (尸佼; c. 390–330 BCE), and the earliest text from Chinese philosophical school of Zajia (雜家; "Syncretism"), which combined ideas from the Hundred Schools of Thought, including Confucianism, Daoism, Mohism, and Legalism. The Shizi text was written c. 330 BCE in twenty sections, and was well known from the Han dynasty (206 BCE – 220 CE) until the Song dynasty (960–1279) when all copies were lost.

Scholars during the Ming (1368–1644) and Qing (1644–1911) dynasties reconstructed the Shizi from quotations in numerous sources, yet only about 15 percent of the original text was recovered and now extant. Western sinology has largely ignored the Shizi and it was one of the last Chinese classics to be translated into English.

== Authorship ==
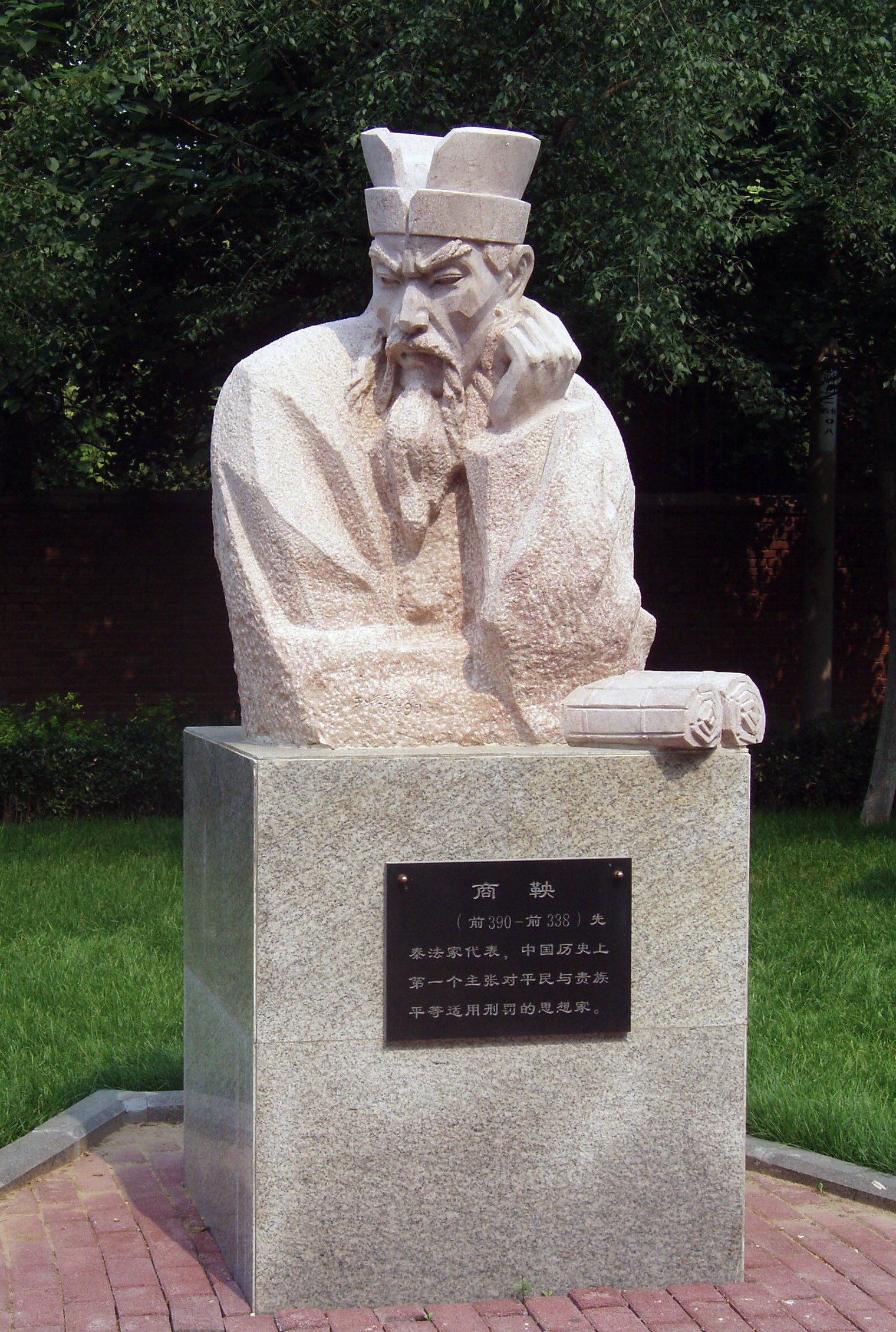
Modern statue of Shang Yang

Little is known about Shi Jiao or Shizi "Master Shi" except for references to his eponymous text. He was probably from the Warring States period state of Jin (modern Shanxi), and employed by the Legalist statesman Shang Yang (390–338 BCE), the chief minister of Qin (modern Shanxi) for Duke Xiao. When Duke Xiao died in 338 BCE, his successor King Huiwen ordered Shang Yang to be executed by dismemberment and his entire family to be exterminated. Shi Jiao fled to the state of Shu (modern Sichuan), where he wrote the Shizi in 20 sections, totaling over 60,000 Chinese characters, and subsequently died.

The Chinese surname Shi is commonly written 石 "stone", 史 "history", 師 "teacher", 時 "time", or 士 "scholar" – but hardly ever written shi (尸; "corpse; ceremonial 'personator' of a dead person"). Besides Shi Jiao, there are few examples other than Shi Cong 尸聰 and Shi Bo 尸帛, who served Yongle Emperor (r. 1402–1424). The given name Jiao or Xiao 佼 can be pronounced jiǎo "handsome; beautiful; excellent", jiāo "associate; have intercourse with", or xiáo "imitate; false". Tang dynasty scholar Sima Zhen first noted the jiǎo (佼) in Shi Jiao was pronounced like jiǎo (絞; "twisted"), which could cause confusion.

== Textual history ==
The Shizi has had a long and dynamic history. The twenty-chapter text was written around 330 BCE, became a famous classic of philosophical Eclecticism, had sections repeatedly lost and recovered from political and military destruction, until only one original chapter existed around 1060 CE, and later scholars partially reconstructed the text from quotes in over seventy Chinese classics. For example, the Syncretist Huainanzi quotes the Shizi 27 times.

The Chinese Imperial Library catalogs in the standard Twenty-Four Histories inventory the Shizi text in twenty sections from the Han through Tang dynasties, and then only one section in the Song dynasty. The most complete reconstruction was done in 1812, but even it only recovered about 15 percent of the original text (about 10,000 of 60,000 characters). Technically speaking, Paul Fischer describes the Shizi text as "simultaneously lost and extant".

The oldest surviving reference to Shizi is found in the (91 BCE) Shiji "Scribal Record" biography of Xunzi (c. 312–230 BCE).

And (in addition to Xun Zi, the state of) Zhao also had Gongsun Long, who made arguments about the similarity and difference of hardness and whiteness, and the sayings of Ju Zi; (the state of) Wei had Li Kui (with his) teaching on fully using the powers of the land; (the state of) Chu had Shizi, Chang Lu, and Yu Zi from A in it. Following from Meng Zi down until Yu Zi, the world has their writings in abundance; therefore (I) will not discuss their biographies.

The (8 BCE) Bielu (別錄; "Separate Records") was a detailed bibliography of holdings in the Imperial Library, including the Shizi. It was begun by the imperial librarian Liu Xiang, and after his death, was completed by his son Liu Xin. Although this early library catalog is no longer extant, there are two surviving Bielu fragments that mention the Shizi. First, Liu Xiang's own Sun Qing shulu (孫卿書錄; "Sun Qing Record") says: "The state of Chu had Shizi, Chang Lu Zi, and Yu Zi, and all wrote texts, but (these) were not of the model of former kings, and none followed the methods of Kong Zi. Only Meng Zi and Xun Qing were able to respect Kong Zi." Second, the Shiji commentary of Pei Yin 裴駰 (fl. 438) more fully quotes it:

Liu Xiang’s Bie lu says: "(The Shi ji says :) 'Chu had Shizi ...' (but I) suspect (it should have) said he (lived) in Shu (not Chu). Now, according to the Shizi text, he was from Jin, (with the) given name Jiao, and was a retainer of Qin chief minister Wei Yang. (When) Wei Yang, the Shang Lord, planned things and designed strategies, and established laws to regulate the people, (he) always devised them with Jiao. (When) the Shang Lord was punished, Jiao feared (that he) also would be killed, and thereupon fled and ran away to Shu. (There he) himself created this text in twenty sections, (with) altogether more than sixty thousand words. (When he) died, (he was) accordingly buried in Shu."

Liu Xin abridged the Bielu catalog into the (6 BCE) Qilue (七略; "Seven Summaries"), and the historian Ban Gu used both catalogs to compile the Yiwenzhi “Literature Record” chapter of his (92 CE) Hanshu "Han History". It lists the Shizi as one of twenty texts in the Syncretist section: "Shizi in twenty sections. (His) given name was Jiao, and (he was) from Lu; the Qin chief minister, the Shang Lord, took him as a teacher, (and when Shang) Yang died, Jiao fled to Shu."

These earliest (91 BCE to 92 CE) references generally agree except for Shizi's home state. Was he from Chu (Shiji), Shu (Bielu author's suspicion), Jin (Bielu author's text), or Lu (Hanshu)? Fischer concludes he was from Jin, primarily because the testimony of the Shizi itself, as specifically cited by Liu Xiang".

The Tang historian Wei Zheng's (656) Suishu "Sui History" first described Shizi chapters being lost: "The Shizi in twenty sections, table of contents in one section. In the Liang (502–557) there were (only) nineteen sections. Authored by Shi Jiao, chief retainer of Qin chief minister Wei Yang. Nine of its sections were lost, and in the Wei (220–265) “Yellow Beginning” (reign era; 220–227), (it was) continued." Wei Zheng says that during the reign of Wei Emperor Cao Pi the nine lost chapters were "continued" (續; xu, which Fischer interprets to mean replacing an incomplete Shizi copy in the imperial collection with a complete copy from a private library.

The (445) Hou Hanshu "Later Han History" only mentions the Shizi once in a quotation, but Tang dynasty crown prince Li Xian's (677) Hou Hanshu commentary is informative.

Shizi was from Jin, had the given name of "Jiao," and was the retainer of Qin chief minister Wei Yang. (When Wei) Yang planned strategies (he) always devised them with Jiao. (When) the Shang Lord was punished, (Shizi) feared (that he) also would be killed, and therefore fled and ran away to Shu, (where he) made a text in twenty sections: nineteen sections elaborate the threads of the Way, virtue, goodness, and propriety, and one section speaks of the nine regions, strategic passes, and the places where river springs originate.

The Shizi text was largely lost sometime between the writing of the 1060 New Tang History and 1345 History of Song. The (1739) Ming and (1927) Qing dynasty imperial catalogs do not list the Shizi. One private catalog, Chen Kui's (1174) Zhongxing Guange shumu (中興館閣書目) lists the text with only one section written on two bundles of bamboo strips (篇; pian. Examining Chinese history between 1060 and 1174 when all full copies of the Shizi text were lost, Fischer suggests the Jingkang Incident when the invading Jurchen soldiers of the Jin Dynasty besieged and sacked Kaifeng, the Northern Song dynasty capital.

During the Ming and Qing dynasties, Chinese scholars worked on reconstructing the Shizi text from quotations. The (c. 1691) Qianqingtang shumu (千頃堂書目; "Thousand Acre Hall Bibliography"), written by Huang Yuji 黄虞稷, lists a Shizi in two sections that was reconstructed by Xu Yuantai 徐元太 around 1565. Although it was lost, six other Shizi reconstructions are still extant; Chen Zhengxue (1640), Hui Dong (1730), Ren Zhaolin (1788), Zhang Zongyuan (1796), Sun Xingyan (1806), and Wang Jipei (1812). The version of Wang Jipei 汪繼培 is considered the most authoritative.

The sources for these reconstructions were based on over seventy texts that quoted the Shizi. Those containing the most quotes are: Ouyang Xun's 604 Typological Collections from the Classics and Other Literature, Yu Shinan's c. 615 "Copied Writings from the North Hall", Wei Zheng's 631 Essentials of Government from Many Books, Li Shan's 658 Notes on the Anthology of Literature, and Li Fang's 983 Taiping Imperial Reader. The Qunshu zhiyao (群書治要) abridgement, comprising over 5,000 characters (out of the original 60,000), quotes 13 of the original 20 chapters, and represents almost half of the reconstructed Shizi text.

Fischer summarizes the Shizi as "both unique and paradigmatic for being the first Syncretist text from a time when eclectic authorship—in both content and form—was the norm. We are fortunate that several Ming and Qing scholars made the effort to reconstruct it, that so much of it was quoted by Wei Zheng in the Tang dynasty, and that Wei’s work was preserved in Japan even while it was lost in China."

== Contents ==
The reconstructed Shizi contains 15 of the original 20 sections or chapters, the first 13 of which primarily derive from Wei Zheng's Qunshu zhiyao. The contents of are shown below, from the Fischer's translations.

Section	Name	Pinyin	Meaning
1	勸學	Quanxue	Exhortation to Learn
2	貴言	Guiyan	Good Advice
3	四儀	Siyi	Four Kinds of Proper Conduct
4	明堂	Mingtang	The Enlightenment Hall
5	分	Fen	Allocation
6	發蒙	Fameng	Emerging from Delusion
7	恕	Shu	Considerateness
8	治天下	Zhi tianxia	Governing the World
9	仁意	Renyi	Good Intentions
10	廣	Guang	Broad-Mindedness
11	綽子	Chuozi	Generous Fellows
12	處道	Chudao	Dwelling in the Way
13	神明	Shenming	Spiritous Enlightenment
14	止楚師	Zhi Chushi	Stopping the Chu Army
15	君治	Junzhi	The Ruler's Governance

In addition to these 15 titled chapters, the reconstructed Shizi comprises 194 yiwen (佚文; "fragments") from source texts that quote the Shizi without specifying the chapter. Nineteen of these fragments have doubtful authenticity because they are only attested in sources later than 1127 CE when the text was probably lost.

The Shizi includes some humorous teachings, such as this anecdote about the importance of naming.

(The state of) Qi had a person named Tian Guo who named his dog "Riches" and his son "Happiness." (Once) when (he) was about to perform a sacrifice, the dog entered the house. Guo yelled at it saying: "Riches, get out!" A shamaness (heard this and) said: "(That) was not auspicious." (Later,) Guo experienced misfortune: (his) eldest son died. Weeping over him, (he) cried: "Happiness!" and (he thus) did not seem to be sad (to those who heard him).

== Key concepts ==
According to Fischer, Shizi's message is based upon four key ideas: self-cultivation, timeliness, humility, and objectivity. "With the single exception of self-cultivation (修身 or 治身), none of these ideals appear as technical terms in the text. Unlike the more usual advice to be good (仁), proper (義), or virtuous (德), even generalized terms for timeliness, humility, and objectivity are not used; rather, the advice must be inferred from the narrative."

Self-cultivation. The beginning of Chapter 1 recommends self-cultivation through broad learning.

To learn without tiring is that by which one cultivates the self; to teach without becoming bored is that by which one cultivates the people. (If) a cocoon is abandoned and not cultivated, then it will rot away and be discarded. (But if) a female artisan extracts the silk, then this can be used to make beautiful brocade, (fit even for) a great ruler to wear to court. (Your) person is (like) a cocoon: (if) it is abandoned and not cultivated, then (your capacity to) think and act will rot away.

One Shizi fragment (188), "Imitate the conch and oyster and close the door", is apparently related to self-cultivation through Daoist meditation

Timeliness. Acting in a timely manner is a recurring textual theme, frequently phrased in terms of shen "spirit; god, deity; spiritual, supernatural" translated as "spiritous". Chapter 2 says:

Misfortunes, at the beginning, are easily dispelled. As for those which cannot be dispelled, avoid them. (Because when) they are fully manifested, (you might) desire to dispel them (but will) be unable, and (you might) desire to avoid them (but will) be unable. Those who deal with (problems) while (still) spiritous: their activities are few but (their) merit is great. ... (When) a house burns and someone saves it, then (we) know their virtue. (But) the elderly who daub chimney cracks to guard (against fire), thereby living their whole lives without the misfortune of stray flames (causing a fire): (their) virtue (remains) unknown! ... Misfortunes also have "chimneys," and (if) worthies were to travel the world to aid in "daubing" them, then the world would have no military suffering, yet none would know their virtue. Therefore it is said: "Sagely people rectify (things) when (they) are yet spiritous [i.e., inchoate]; stupid people contend with (things) after (they) have become obvious."

The following context clarifies the semantics of "spiritous", "This 'spiritousness' is the beginning of the myriad things, the leading thread of the myriad affairs."

Humility. The Shizi teaches that rulers should have humility when seeking good ministers, as well as have eminence when effectively ruling. For instance, this dialogue between Confucius and his disciple Zixia,

"Kong Zi said: 'Zixia, do you know how rulers function as rulers?' Zixia replied: '(If) fish lose the water (they are in), then (they) will die, (but) if water loses the fish (in it, it) is still water.' Kong Zi said: 'You know it!'." An effective ruler needs both to practice humility and to pursue self-cultivation through study.

Objectivity. The text recommends that rulers objectively hire, fire, promote, and demote officials based upon the verifiable results of performance, rather than upon the traditional criteria of nepotism and hereditary rank.

The stupid and wise (decisions) of the many ministers are daily presented before (you): choose those whom are knowledgeable about affairs and order their plans (to be carried out). Those whom the many ministers promote are daily presented before (you): choose those whom are knowledgeable about people and order their promotions (to be carried out). The orderly and disorderly (effects) of the many ministers are daily presented before (you): choose those whom are competent in undertaking tasks and order their governance (to be carried out). ... (If you) use the worthy and employ the competent, (then you) will govern without exertion. (If you) rectify names and examine reality, (then you) will be revered without (having to) punish. (If you) arrive at the facts and see (them) purely, then truth and fallacy will not be obscured.

While many Masters texts discussed the importance of employing worthies and rectifying names, the Shizi exceptionally argued for detached objectivity through "examining reality" (覈實) and "seeing purely" (見素).

== Syncretism ==
The Shizi is the oldest extant text from the Zajia (雜家; "Syncretism") School, which is described as the "eclectic, discriminating, selective, and consolidating trend in philosophical literature". Shizi's writings were popular for centuries before the comprehensive Syncretist collections (c. 239 BCE) Lüshi Chunqiu and (c. 139 BCE) Huainanzi. The Han scholar Dong Zhongshu (179–104 BCE) used the Syncretic method to combine early Confucianism with Naturalist and Legalist thought, and to promote Confucianism into the new official ideology of Imperial China. Ultimately, Fischer describes Master Shi as "a man of his times. His syncretism made explicit the eclecticism of other authors of his day and demonstrated that many of their ideas were not necessarily incompatible.") Consider this statement that six Zi "Masters" had substantially similar doctrines:

Mo Zi valued impartiality; Kong Zi valued public-mindedness, Huang Zi valued centeredness, Tian Zi valued equanimity, Lie Zi valued emptiness, and Liao Zi valued dispelling closed-mindedness. Their schools mutually denied each other, stopping (only) after several generations: but all were trapped in selfishness. Heaven, thearch, sovereign, monarch, governor, lord: all are (words for) "ruler." Immense, wide open, vast, wide, broad, large, spacious, encompassing, supreme, eminent, big: all are (words for) "great." More than ten names but the actuality is one. If (you) make impartiality, public-mindedness, emptiness, equanimity, centeredness, peace, and dispelling closed-mindedness one actuality, then there will be no mutual negating.

This passage is unusual because pre-Qin masters texts typically refer to other masters with disparagement or differentiation. The Zhuangzi, for instance, describes the early schools of Mohism whose, "divergent distortions were so different that they called each other "aberrant Mohists." They reviled each other with their disputations over "hard" and "white" and over "sameness" and "difference," as well as with their rejoinders to each other over the disparity between "odd" and "even"." The Chinese lexicographers Yong and Peng identify this Shizi passage, with six synonyms meaning jun (君; "ruler") and 11 synonyms meaning da (大; "great; big"), as the source for the (c. 3rd century BCE) Erya dictionary (1.2–1.3) definitions that list 10 synonyms meaning jun (君) and 39 meaning da (大).

The zhuzi (諸子; "The Masters/Philosophers") category of the Yiwenzhi "Treatise on Literature" in the Hanshu subdivided philosophical books into ten schools: Confucianism (儒家), Daoism (道家), School of Yin-Yang (陰陽家), Legalism (法家), School of Names or Designatism (名家), Mohism (墨家), Diplomatic (縱橫家), Syncretism (雜家), Agriculturalism (農家), and Miscellaneous (小說). It summarized Syncretism: "Syncretists probably emerged from the Councilor office. (They) combine Ruism and Mohism, unite Designatism and Legalism, know that (proper) state formation has (all) these, and see that (proper) kingly government is entirely interconnected: these are its strengths. (But if) the dissolute practice it, then (they) become dissipated and have no foundation to (which they can) return." The reconstructed Shizi text refers to most of these schools of thought.

Confucianism or Ruism was centered upon the teachings and principles of Kongzi or Confucius. The Shizi upholds several Confucianist concepts, including ren "goodness; humaneness", yi "propriety; righteousness", li "ritual; courtesy", and zhengming "rectification of names". The text cites Confucius 17 times, more than any other person, and several quotes are not recorded elsewhere. For instance, this story about Zichan when he was prime minister for Duke Jian 簡公 (r. 564– 530 BCE) of Zheng.

Zheng Duke Jian said to Zichan: "Joyless drinking and unsounded bells and drums are my responsibilities (to repair). A misruled state, a disordered court, and not attaining (our) aims in dealing with the state sovereigns are your responsibilities (to repair). (If) you do not meddle in my pleasure, I will not meddle in your court." From then on, Zichan governed Zheng and the city gates did not close, the state had no robbers or criminals, and (its) roads had no hungry people (on them). Kong Zi said: "Even with Zheng Duke Jian’s love of pleasure, still, even if (he) had held court while hugging a bell, it would have been acceptable."

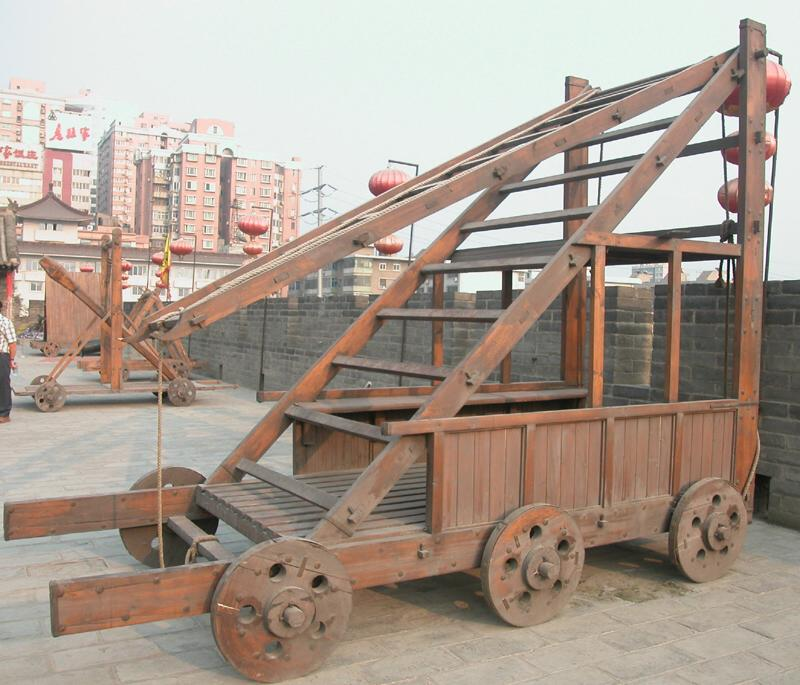
Ancient Chinese siege scaling ladder, replica in Xi'an

Mohism emphasized universal love and meritocracy, in which rulers employ worthy ministers regardless of their social class. The Shizi likewise stressed meritocracy, for instance,

In ancient times, enlightened kings in pursuit of worthies did not avoid those far or near, nor discuss (their) status or lack thereof, (but rather they) denigrated (their own) positions in order to yield to the worthy, and diminished (their own) persons in order to put the (worthy) official first. Thus, Yao followed Shun into the midst of the fields, faced north to look at him, and did not fuss about a show of ritual. This is why former kings were able to rectify heaven and earth and is the reason why (they could) benefit the myriad things.

Mohism repudiated warfare, and Chapter 14 "Stopping the Chu Army" tells a legend about how Mozi convinced the king of Chu not to use Lu Ban's newly invented "meets-with-heaven" mobile scaling ladder to attack the weaker state of Song. When Mozi asked the king what sort of person would refuse his own sumptuous, decorated carriage and want to steal his neighbor's dilapidated cart, the king replied, "He definitely has a stealing sickness". Mozi responded, "Chu territory is two thousand kilometers square, (while) Song territory is (only) two hundred kilometers square: these are like the decorated carriage and the dilapidated cart!", which convinced the king to cancel the attack.

School of Names or Logicians focused upon the relationship between words and reality. The Shizi links the Logician doctrine of fen (分; "separation; distribution; allocation") with the Confucian rectification of names. Joseph Needham writes that the primary meaning of fen is "separation", but the Shizi uses it to mean "the allotment of duties to persons by the ruler or lord", comparable with Greek Moira "portion of the whole". Chapter 5 "Allocation" favors explicitly allocating tasks and responsibilities to specific ministers, through the "rectification" of ministerial titles and "allocation" of the duties that accompany any given position.

Heaven and earth produce the myriad things and sages categorize them. (They) categorize things by means of establishing allocations, and facilitate (human) affairs by means of instituting (political) offices. Ruler and minister, father and son, superior and inferior, elder and youth, honored and despised, close and distant all fulfilling their allocations is called order. Concern that fulfills (its) allocation is called good; giving that fulfills (its) allocation is called proper; contemplation that fulfills (its) allocation is called wise; action that fulfills (its) allocation is called appropriate; words that fulfill (their) allocation are called faithful. After (you) have fulfilled all (these) allocations, (you) will become a complete person.

School of Yin Yang or Naturalists believed heaven and earth were composed of qi, constantly transforming through yin-yang and wuxing. The Shizidescribes this school's correlative cosmology idea that the universe responds to the ruler's morality.

Goodness, propriety, sageliness, and wisdom are joined with heaven and earth. If heaven did not canopy (them), (then) how could the people depend upon (it) and gaze into (it)? If the earth did not support (them), (then ) how could the people live (from it) and move (on it)? If sages did not order (them), (then) how could the people be guided and led (by them)? This is why heaven canopies them, the earth supports them, and sages order them. The person of the sage is like the sun. The sun (is only) one foot (in diameter), (but its) brightness fills heaven and earth. The person of the sage is (also) small, but it illuminates places that are distant. Sages rectify themselves and the four quadrants are (thereby) ordered.

Daoism was based upon the universal Dao (道; "Way") and advocated wuwei "effortlessnesss", ziran "naturalness", and simplicity. The Shizi mentions the Daoist paradigm of a mysterious cosmic Way. "Guard the Way firmly, (even in) extremity, then (you may) make light of kingship or dukedom." It also refers to three Daoist masters, Tianzi (Tian Pian 田駢), Liezi, and Lao Laizi (sometimes identified as Laozi): "Tian Zi valued equanimity, Lie Zi valued emptiness, Liao Zi valued dispelling closed-mindedness".

Legalism was based upon the idea of rule by law, through rewards and punishments. Even though Shizi was a retainer of the famous Legalist Shang Yang, his reconstructed writings rarely refer to Legalism. Two examples: "(If) rewards and punishments follow names (then) the people will all be respectful.", "(When) the vehicle is light and the road is short, then the whip and the goad are not needed. That for which the whip and goad are needed is a long road or a heavy load. Punishments and laws are the whip and goad for the people."

Agriculturalism advocated for rulers to participate in farming activities, following the example of their culture hero Shennong "Divine Farmer", who invented agriculture. The Shizi does not directly refer to Agriculturalism but mentions Shennong five times. For instance, "Shun personally had (some) southside acres (of farmland), (while his) wife had fields of mulberry trees; Shen Nong likewise tilled and ruled. (This) is how (they) encouraged tilling."
