= Liang Yusheng (Qing dynasty) =

Qing dynasty Confucian scholar

Liang Yusheng (simplified Chinese: 梁玉绳; traditional Chinese: 梁玉繩; pinyin: Liáng Yùshéng; 1745–1819) was a Confucian classical scholar and historian of the Qing dynasty. His courtesy name (zi) was Yaobei 曜北, and he styled himself Qingbaishi 清白士 (“Pure and Clean Scholar”). He was from Qiantang 钱塘 (Renhe 仁和) in the Hangzhou area in Zhejiang. During the Qianlong reign, he obtained the status of a gongsheng 贡生 (a recommended scholar). Liang Yusheng was a grandson of the Grand Academician (daxueshi 大學士) Liang Shizheng 梁詩正 (1697–1763).

Before reaching the age of forty, he abandoned the imperial civil service examinations (keju) in order to devote himself entirely to writing and scholarship. He conducted extensive research on the Shujing (Book of Documents) and the Three Commentaries on the Chunqiu (Spring and Autumn Annals), and was especially accomplished in the field of historiography.

His major work, Shiji zhiyi (simplified Chinese: 史记志疑; traditional Chinese: 史記志疑), a critical study on doubtful passages in the Shiji (by Sima Qian, variously translated with Grand Scribe’s Records, or Records of the Grand Historian), was composed over a period of twenty-five years and revised five times. The scholar Qian Daxin 錢大昕 (1728–1804) praised him as a “a meritorious minister of Longmen” (Longmen gongchen 龙门功臣), an allusion to Sima Qian.

His work continued and further developed the exegetical tradition during the Qing dynasty. He died at the age of seventy-six.

His collected works were published under the title Qingbaishi ji 清白士集 (Collected Works of Qingbaishi). His work Pieji (瞥記, in seven juan) primarily contains explanations of the Confucian Classics and contributes to clarifying their ancient meanings.

A short biography is contained in the Qingshi gao 清史稿 (juan 481), others in the Jiaolang cuolu 蕉廊脞錄 and Qingru xue'an 清儒學案.

A short biographical notice written by Tu Lien-chê 杜聯喆 (1902–1994) was included in Arthur Hummel's Eminent Chinese of the Ch'ing Period (ECCP).

== Works (in selection) ==
- Shiji zhiyi 史记志疑 (his major work; 36 juan, first printed 1787; rpt. Beijing: Zhonghua shuju, 1981). - The Hanyu da zidian uses the edition of the Shixue congshu 史学丛书.
- Lüzi jiaobu 吕子校补
- Hanshu renbiao kao 汉书人表考
- Yuanhao lüe 元号略
- Qingbaishi ji 清白士集

Pieji 瞥記 1 juan (Huang-Qing jingjie), in: Qingbaishi ji 清白士集

== See also ==
- Commentaries of the Three Scholars (Sanjia zhu 三家注)

== Bibliography ==
- Weiguo Cao: Liang Yusheng's critical study of the Doubtful Passages in the Grand Scribe's Records and its impact on modern scholarship. A dissertation submitted in partial fulfillment of the requirements for the degree of Doctor of Philosophy (Chinese) at the University of Wisconsin–Madison. 2016
- Tu Lien-chê: "Liang Yü-shêng" (ECCP)
- Jeffrey Riegel: A Journal of My Misgivings: Liang Yusheng, Sima Qian, and the History of Qin. China Research Monograph 79. Institute of East Asian Studies, University of California, Berkeley 2023
- Article: "Liang Yusheng", in: Zhongguo zhexue da cidian 中国哲学大辞典. Zhang Dainian 张岱年 (ed.). Shanghai cishu chubanshe 上海辞书出版社, Shanghai 2010
- Li Xueqin, Lü Wenyu (eds.): Siku da cidian 四庫大辭典. 2 vols., Jilin daxue chubanshe, Changchun 1996 (I:867 f.: Shiji zhiyi)
