= Lüshi Chunqiu =

Chinese annals compiled in 239 BC

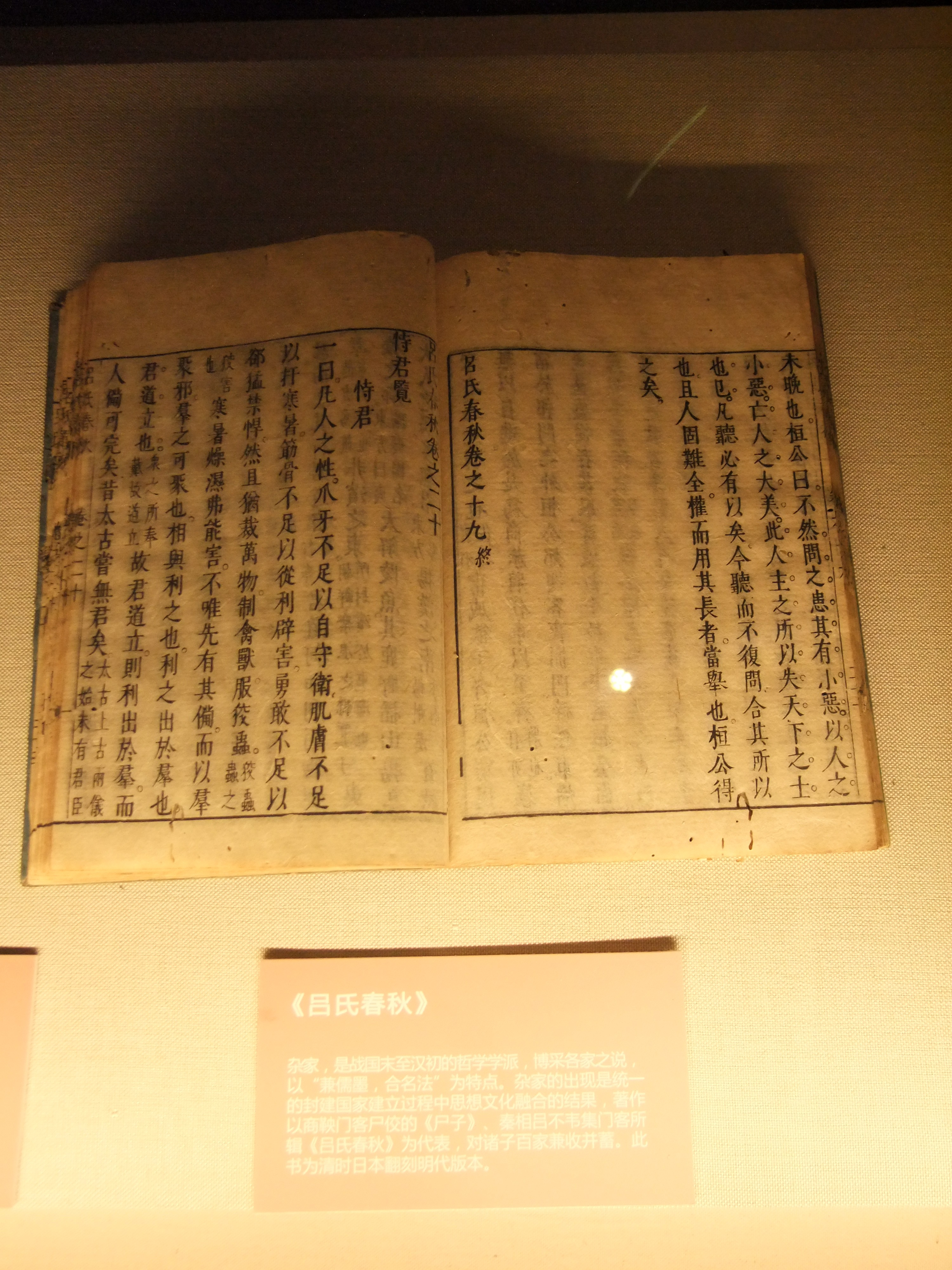
- An Edo period (1603–1868) edition
- Author: Lü Buwei
- Original title: 呂氏春秋
- Language: Chinese
- Genre: Chinese classics
- Publication place: China

Lǚshì chūnqiū
- Traditional Chinese: 呂氏春秋
- Simplified Chinese: 吕氏春秋
- Literal meaning: "Mr. Lü's Spring and Autumn [Annals]"
Transcriptions
Standard Mandarin
- Hanyu Pinyin: Lǚshì chūnqiū
- Wade–Giles: Lü^{3}-shih^{4} Ch'un^{1}-ch'iu^{1}
- IPA: [lỳʂɻ̩̂ ʈʂʰwə́ntɕʰjóʊ]
Wu
- Romanization: Liu-zy Tshen-chieu
Yue: Cantonese
- Yale Romanization: Léuih-sih Chēun-chāu
- Jyutping: Leoi^{5}-si^{6} Ceon^{1}-cau^{1}
- IPA: [lɵɥ˩˧.si˨ tsʰɵn˥.tsʰɐw˥]
Southern Min
- Hokkien POJ: Lū-sī Chhun-chhiu
Eastern Min
- Fuzhou BUC: Lṳ̄-sê Chŭng-chiŭ
Middle Chinese
- Middle Chinese: Ljó-d͡ʒjé tɕʰwin-tsʰjuw
Old Chinese
- Baxter–Sagart (2014): *[r]ˤa k.dəʔ tʰun tsʰiw

The Lüshi Chunqiu (simplified Chinese: 吕氏春秋; traditional Chinese: 呂氏春秋; lit. 'Lü's Spring and Autumn'), abbreviated Lülan 吕览 "Lu Survey", also known in English as Master Lü's Spring and Autumn Annals, is an encyclopedic Chinese classic text compiled around 239 BC under the patronage of late pre-imperial Qin Chancellor Lü Buwei. One of the longest early texts, it extends to over 100,000 words.

Incorporating ideas from the "full range" of intellectual traditions dating back from the late Warring States period, in the evaluation of Michael Loewe, "The Lü shih ch'un ch'iu is unique among early works in that it is well organized and comprehensive, containing extensive passages on such subjects as music and agriculture, unknown elsewhere."

Combining ideas from many different 'schools', it was traditionally classified as 'Syncretist', though there was no school that called itself Syncretist. Almost certainly written for review by Qin authorities, or those who were going to come into a position of authority, Yuri Pines considered it more moral leaning than the Strategies of the Warring States.

== Dating ==
Early linguistic investigations of the Lushi Chunqiu were performed by Richard Wilhelm and Naitō Torajirō, with Michael F. Carson (1980) discussing "some characteristic features of grammar and style in a third century b.c. text". Early scholarship considered the listed late Warring States period date of circa 239 BCE satisfactory without disagreement, generally accepting the Lushi Chunqiu as a legitimate pre-Qin dynasty text.

At the turn of the millennium, it was still accepted as completed "about two decades before Qin Shihuangdi united the empire". Its Almanacs have a postface that can be dated to 239 BCE, and were likely completed first. The other two halves would seem completed in haste after the death of Lu Buwei in 235 BCE, not completely adhering to the plan outlined in the postface.

The earliest and "most instructive" direct reference to the Lushi Chunqiu is in the early Han Shiji; though the earlier Han text Huainanzi also makes extensive unattributed use of the Lushi Chunqiu. The abbreviated title Lülan also derives from the Shiji (ch.130). The much later Han Gao You is the Lushi Chunqiu's earliest and most well known commentator.

As claimed in the Shiji's Lu Buwei biography, it is, in comparison with the Zhuangzi or Guanzi, a "project" written according to an "overarching plan", and clearly designed with specific internal divisions in mind. In this sense, it more closely resembles later early Han works like the Shiji and Huainanzi, but has a different formatting. Rather than the Inner and Outer chapters format later said to have been given to Huainanzi and Zhuangzi, it has large internal divisions, called examinations 覽 (eight chapters), discourses 論 (six chapters), and almanacs 紀 (twelve chapters).

== Dating arguments ==
Alongside Warring States period language, the Lushi Chunqiu displays Warring States attitudes considering it impossible to disband the army, whereas the Han dynasty came to consider itself superior based on peace. Though highly composite, sinologist Scott Cook (2021) argued that its political position aligns with late Warring States Xunzi philosophy. It also makes significant quotation and reuse of the Zhuangzi, including concepts of a Yielding Kingship, though not to the degree of the Huainanzi.

Chinese scholarship still argued a traditional late pre-imperial Warring States dating in 2021, relying on terminology taking compounds like "dao-de" as late. Becoming a title for Laozi, earlier figures like Mencius do not use the term "dao-de", or "way and virtue". But this is synonymous with an argument that the Inner Chapters of the Zhuangzi are early as lacking the terms. The Lushi Chunqiu can be used to argue that some Outer and Misccelaneous Zhuangzi chapters date back to at least the late Warring States period.

== Lu Buwei background ==
It is not known what part Lu Buwei played in the Lushi Chunqiu's compilation, with most of it "probably" composed by the scholars he is said to have recruited. The postface of the text says that he "succeeded in studying what the Yellow Sovereign used to instruct the Zhuanxu Sovereign"; i.e. that he engaged in study intending to produce a compendium for the upcoming emperor, as "instructions in the methods of kingship for a young ruler", most likely as a guide to conduct.(Lewis)

The Shiji (chap. 85, p. 2510) biography of Lü Buwei has the earliest information about the Lüshi Chunqiu. Lü was a successful merchant from Handan who befriended King Zhuangxiang of Qin. The king's son Zheng, who the Shiji suggests was actually Lü's son, eventually became the first emperor Qin Shi Huang in 221 BC.

When Zhuangxiang died in 247 BC, Lü was made regent for the 13-year-old Zheng. In order to establish Qin as the intellectual center of China, Lü "recruited scholars, treating them generously so that his retainers came to number three thousand". In 239 BC, he, in the words of the Shiji:

... ordered that his retainers write down all that they had learned and assemble their theses into a work consisting of eight "Examinations", six "Discourses", and twelve "Almanacs", totaling more than 200,000 words.

According to the Shiji, Lü exhibited the completed text at the city gate of Xianyang, capital of Qin, and above it a notice offering a thousand measures of gold to any traveling scholar who could add or subtract even a single word.

The Hanshu Yiwenzhi listed the Lüshi Chunqiu as belonging to the Zajia (杂家; 雜家; 'mixed school'), within the philosophers' domain (諸子略), or Hundred Schools of Thought. Although this text is frequently characterized as "syncretic", "eclectic", or "miscellaneous", it was a cohesive summary of contemporary philosophical thought, including Legalism, Confucianism, Mohism, and Daoism.

== Contents ==
The title uses chunqiu (春秋; spring and autumn) to mean 'annals; chronicle' in a reference to the Confucianist Spring and Autumn Annals, which chronicles the State of Lu history from 722–481 BC.

The text comprises 26 juan (卷; 'scrolls', 'books') in 160 pian (篇; 'sections'), and is divided into three major parts.

1. The Ji (紀; 'Almanacs') comprises books 1–12, which correspond to the months of the year, and lists appropriate seasonal activities to ensure that the state runs smoothly. This part, which was copied as the Liji chapter Yueling, takes many passages from other texts, often without attribution.
2. The Lan (覧; 'Examinations') comprises books 13–20, which each have 8 sections. This is the longest and most eclectic part, giving quotations from many early texts, some no longer extant.
3. The Lun (論; 'Discourses') comprises books 21–26, which mostly deal with rulership, except for the final four sections about agriculture. This part resembles the Lan in composition.

=== Integrity of the text ===
The composition's features, measure of completeness (i.e. the veracity of the Shiji account) and possible corruption of the original Annals have been subjects of scholarly attention. It has been mentioned that the Almanacs have much greater integrity and thematic organization than the other two parts of the text.

The Yuda (諭大) chapter of the Examinations, for example, contains text almost identical to the Wuda (務大) chapter of the Discourses, though in the first case it is ascribed to Jizi (季子), and in the second to Confucius.

== "Encyclopedic" tradition ==
Lu Buwei's traditional Biography in the Shiji says the Lushi Chunqiu was compiled to provide a “complete account of Heaven and Earth, the myriad things, and the affairs of past and present". Lü Buwei "ordered his retainers to record what they had learned... Proclaiming that it embraced Heaven and Earth, the myriad things and all events old and new, he called it Lüshi chunqiu”. Hence, traditionalist Liu Xiaogan sees the Lüshi chunqiu's objective as to make an encyclopedic work that collected what others had said.

Sinologist Scott Cook acknowledges its statement inasmuch as the Lushi Chunqiu's composite nature is a hallmark of the text. But it does not present individual schools; its comprehensive philosophy is "consciously selected and amalgamated" from disparate positions, the work (or Lu Buwei) aiming to harmonize its various voices. Cook tried to demonstrate that its musical chapters graft "Orthodox Confucian philosophy" onto a "Laoist metaphysical" worldview."

Though not the "true" enormous encyclopedias associated with the Tang dynasty onward, Huainanzi translator John Major took the Lushi Chunqiu and Huainanzi as forming an "encyclopedic" tradition together with the Guanzi and Shiji. Intended for rulers, though they do have philosophical bias, the Huainanzi would arguably intend to represent a compendium of contemporary ideas and views. It uses the Lushi Chunqiu for ideas including topography and the origin of music, albeit for its own political argument.

Inasmuch as the Huiananzi reflects early Han dynasty intellectual life, it suggests a strong continued relevance for the Lushi Chunqiu into the early Han dynasty before it was sidelined by Confucian and other classics. The Lushi Chunqiu's ideologically militarist components in particular would not have remained relevant as the Han dynasty progressed. The Huainanzi otherwise makes more prominent use of the Tao te Ching and Zhuangzi, with the Tao te Ching earlier named a classic under Emperor Jing of Han.

== Major positions ==
Admitting the difficulties of summarizing the Lüshi Chunqiu, John Knoblock and Jeffrey Riegel list 18 major points:

1. Affirmation of self-cultivation and impartiality
2. Rejection of hereditary ruler over the empire
3. Stupidity as the cause of hereditary rule
4. Need for government to honor the concerns of the people
5. The central importance of learning and teachers
6. Support and admiration for learning as the basis of rule
7. Non-assertion on the part of the ruler
8. Primary task for a ruler is to select his ministers
9. Need for a ruler to trust the expertise of his advisers
10. Need for a ruler to practice quiescence
11. The attack on Qin practices
12. Just warfare
13. Respect for civil arts
14. Emphasis on agriculture
15. Facilitating trade and commerce
16. Encouraging economy and conservation
17. Lightening of taxes and duties
18. Emphasis on filial piety and loyalty.

The Lüshi chunqiu is an invaluable compendium of early Chinese thought and civilization.

== Ch.84 Examining the Present ==
Hu Shih made an early dating argument that the Lushi Chunqiu continued to be edited during the Qin dynasty by Li Si, particularly the chajin (察今) chapter. Chajin or "Examining the Present" mainly argues that "When the ages change and the times move on, changing the regulations is fitting", which can be found in the Qin-associated Han Feizi (Ch. "Wudu").

However, "Changing with the times" characterizes Warring States thought. It need not be specific to Qin or Han Fei. It can also be found in the Zhuangzi (Ch. "Tianyun"). The Lushi Chunqiu shares content with nearly half its chapters. Though some of the Zhuangzi is considered to be from the Han dynasty, arguably, none of these examples are of Qin dynasty or Han dynasty derivation.

== Ch.95 Ren Shu Relying on methods ==
=== Wu wei ===
Although the Tao te Ching was popular by the late Warring States period, Laozi's approach to government is more "non-interventionist". In comparison with Xun Kuang's subordination of punishment under moral government, later-termed "Huang-Lao Daoism" includes penal law in a secondary place under "laissez-faire" government. But this is more characteristic of the early Han dynasty.

Though not necessarily the "ruling" idelogy, China's officialdom was arguably becoming more Huang-Lao Daoistic before the Han. While the Lushi Chunqiu may not specifically favor Laozi (or other major figures like Confucius), Ren Shu incorporates a "Daoist-Legalist" fusion comparable to Shen Buhai, Shen Dao, Han Fei, Guanzi and the Mawangdui Huangdi sijing, demonstrating that a philosophy promoting the wu wei reduced activity of the ruler goes back to the Warring States period.

Ren shu says:

To follow is the method of the ruler; to act is the way of the minister. If (the ruler) acts, he will be troubled, if he follows, he will find peace. To follow the winter when it produces cold and the summer when it produces heat, why should the ruler do anything? Therefore to say: "The way of the ruler is to have no knowledge and no action, but still he is more worthy than those who know and act," that is to get the point."

== Ch.99 No duality ==
Sinologist Scott Cook (2021) sees the Lushi Chunqiu as reading "like a comprehensive blueprint for the successful rulership of the world". Maintaining a "relatively consistent position", its authors seem to have had a "reasonably clear notion" of their ideal before composition, with Lu Buwei's retainers primarily "filling in details" and the text ironing out the differences.

Cook summarizes the "government of the next true king" in the Lushi Chunqiu as "expressly articulated" in the Bu er 不二 "no duality" chapter. The chapter states that “When the state is ruled by listening to the deliberations of numerous people, the imperilment of the state is not far off", leaving the sage to "even out the myriad differences." Combining different positions, it is not the philosophy of any one school. Bu er summarizes:

1. The true king values his health and longevity while being benevolent and compassionate toward the people.
2. In government affairs, the true king's government emphasizes "the promotion of worthies and deference toward gentlemen-scholars."
3. It opposes lavish burials as unfilial, instead highlighting "the role of musical performance" in self-cultivation as adorning and spreading the king's "charismatic virtue"
4. "It would be a rule of humanity, propriety, and moral suasion", giving only second place to rewards and punishments.

=== Confucianist syncretism ===
Cook charactered the Lushi Chunqiu's musical chapters as grafting "Orthodox Confucianism" onto a "Laois metaphysical world view". As described in Bu Er, an aim for long life would also typically be associated with "Laoism", or Huang-Lao Daoism. But an aim for long life may not simply originate in Daoism. Laozi and Zhuangzi accept long life as a desired good, and some of their followers may suppose that "embodying the dao" could prolong life. But the two also accept death.

An aim for long life can also show the influence of the more moral-leaning, Xunzi and be found in the Han Feizi. Cook considered the Lushi Chunqiu's "nuanced position" as consciously selecting, and "largely concordant" with that of Xun Kuang, including (otherwise Mohist) reward and punishment in a subordinate position to a moral government based on propriety.

The Lushi Chunqiu includes elements of Mohism, but are anonymized as the disfavored philosophy, as a mode of argument typical earlier in the Warring States period. Conforming to the spirit of antiquity without committing to its specific forms, while the Lushi Chunqiu gives no credence to governmental models of remote antiquity, Xunzi also referred more to recent kings. Mainly, Xunzi gives a more explicit prominent role to li (rites) in statecraft.

Humanity, propriety and musical education refer to Confucian values. The opposition to lavish burials is Mohist, but distances and dissociates itself from Mohism and its positions in favour of Laoism and Confucianism. It claims lavish burials as unfilial - a Confucian concern, and criticizes Mohist opposition to music while attempting to obscure them as anonymous.

Its main compromise with Mohism is an acceptance of people as seeking benefit, which it pairs with compassion under humanity and propriety. Worth, reward and penalty can be associated with Mohism, but are subsumed under a Confucianist "philosophy of governance through humanity and moral suasion" earlier reconciled by Xunzi.

=== Impartialist militarism ===
While an invaluable compendium "accommodating diverse textual traditions", a militarist section of the work takes a "multiplicity of views" as dangerous to the Qin state if listened to too much, though it withholds judgment of Laozi, Confucius, Mozi, Yang Zhu, or Sun Bin, resorting to a "military model" comparable to the Art of War rather than an ideology. Likely not considering it useful as a comparative, in the early Han, Sima Tan didn't include militarism as a school. But militarism is a major viewpoint of the Qin, that is, its stratocracy.

If one listens to the views of the many, then there is no day that the state will be free of danger. How to know who is right? Lao Dan [Laozi) values the soft, Confucius values humanity, Mo Di values the inexpensive, Guan Yin values clarity, Zi Liezi values vacuity, Chen Pian values things equally, Yang Sheng [Yang Zhu] values himself, Sun Bin values strategic configuration, Wang Liao values being ahead, Ni Liang values being behind.

To unify the ears [of one's troops], use metal drums. To unify their minds, make standards and commands the same. To unify their intelligence, keep the wise from being crafty and the stupid from being clumsy. To unify their strength, keep the brave from going ahead and the cowardly from lagging behind.

While the Lushi Chunqiu considers learning and teachers of central importance as if its fifth major point, as noted under Major Positions, John Knoblock includes filial piety as its last major point, and wu wei as its seventh. But "Affirmation of self-cultivation and impartiality" is its first position. While the work does encourage the ruler to listen to ministers, its own priorities consist of such mundane positions as facilitating agriculture, trade and commerce, thrift, and reducing taxes.

Although Qin's Shang Yang, the Han Feizi or Sima Qian's Li Si are less tolerant, Yuri Pines (Stanford Encyclopedia) analysis of them is similar to Smith. Shang Yang was anti-intellectual but did not actually care about the content of doctrines. Not "adoring" a martial spirit, he was concerned with recruiting farmers and soldiers, inculcating militarist regulations rather than values. Li Si isn't specifically anti-Confucian, so much as simply authoritarian. Opposing the "discourses of the former kings" in favor of teaching law in Chapter 49, the Han Feizi's Chapter 50 resorts to simply having the king promulgate and prohibit doctrines, whatever they may be. By comparison, they cared more about state control, but still not doctrinal unity. Despite the later term Chinese Legalism, they do not provide an ideological alternative.

== Xunzi or Legalism ==
The early Han text Huainanzi makes extensive use of the Lushi Chunqiu, leading some early scholars to label some the Huainanzi's chapters as Legalist. Arguably the Lushi Chunqiu is closer to Xun Kuang. The Huainanzi makes some anti-Confucian use of the Han Feizi's argumentation, but neither the Lushi Chunqiu or Huainanzi think very highly of Shang Yang, as the figure typically thought of as a penal "Legalist". The Lushi Chunqiu titles his chapter "unrighteous". The Lushi Chunqiu and Huainanzi instead draw on "bits and pieces" of Xunzi's "Daoist-Legalist" predecessor Shen Dao for their own "heterogeneous political outlook." The Lushi Chunqiu's ideas on Shen Dao also look more like Xunzi.

Punishment as an ideological distinction from Confucianism is arguably meaningless once Xun Kuang reconciles punishment in a subordinate position under "Confucianism", "gentlemen-scholars", or what Cook terms a "philosophy of governance through humanity and moral suasion". The Lushi Chunqiu doesn't commit to a prominent place for specific Confucian rituals in statecraft, but promotes deference toward the "gentlemen-scholars" and considers it unlikely that reward and punishment will succeed without propriety. To be distinct from Xunzi Confucianism, it would be necessary to oppose the authority of li ritual and "gentlemen-scholars", more like the Han Feizi, not just have punishment or law as an element of government.

== Correction bounty ==
The Shiji tells that after Lü Buwei presented the finished Lüshi Chunqiu for the public at the gate of Xianyang and announced that anyone could correct the book's content would be awarded 1000 taels of gold for every corrected word. This event lead to the Chinese idiom "One word [is worth] a thousand gold" (一字千金).

None of the contemporary scholars pointed out any mistakes in the work, although later scholars managed to detect a number of them. It is believed that Lü's contemporaries were able to detect the book's inaccuracies, but none dared to openly criticize a powerful figure like him.

== Reception ==
Scholar Liang Qichao (1873–1929) stated: "This book, through the course of two thousand years, has had no deletions nor corruptions. Moreover, it has the excellent commentary of Gao You. Truly it is the most perfect and easily read work among the ancient books." Liang's position, mildly criticized afterwards, was dictated by the lack of canonical status ascribed to the book.

== Translations ==
Before John Knoblock and Jeffrey Riegel's translation (2001), Michael Loewe (1993) states that the only complete translation (into a European language) was Richard Wilhelm's (German) translation, "Frühling und Herbst des Lü Bu we; aus dem Chinesischen verdeutscht und erläutert; Jena: Eugen Diederichs, 1928; reprinted, with a new preface by Hellmut Wilhelm, 1971."

There were also several Japanese translations; "Kokuyaku kambun taisei, no. 20, 1924, edited by Fujita Toyohachi; Kambun sōsho, 1928, edited by Okada Masayuki; Chūgoku koten shinsho, 1976, edited by Uchino Kumaichirō and Nakamura Shōhachi.'

== Works cited ==
- Chong, Kim-chong, ed. (2022). Dao Companion to the Philosophy of the Zhuangzi. Dao Companions to Chinese Philosophy. Springer. doi:10.1007/978-3-030-92331-0. ISBN 978-3-030-92330-3.
  - Klein, Esther (2022). "Early Chinese Culture and the Zhuangzi Anthology: An Alternative Model for Authorship". In Chong, Kim-chong (ed.). Dao Companion to the Philosophy of the Zhuangzi. Springer. pp. 37–57. doi:10.1007/978-3-030-92331-0_3. ISBN 978-3-030-92330-3.
- Cook, Scott (2021). The Use and Abuse of History in Early China: From Xun Zi to Lüshi chunqiu. Albany: State University of New York Press. ISBN 978-1-4384-8507-2.
- Creel, Herrlee Glessner (1982) [1970]. What Is Taoism?: And Other Studies in Chinese Cultural History. University of Chicago Press. ISBN 9780226120478. JSTOR 1397689. OCLC 1256745090 – via Google Books.
- Goldin, Paul R. (2005). After Confucius: Studies In Early Chinese Philosophy. University of Hawai'i Press. ISBN 978-0-8248-2842-4.
  - Goldin, Paul R. (2005a), "Insidious Syncretism in the Political Philosophy of Huainanzi" (PDF), University of Hawai'i Press: 90–111
- Hansen, Chad (1992). A Daoist Theory of Chinese Thought. Oxford: Oxford University Press. ISBN 978-0-19-535076-0.
- Hansen, Chad (2025). "Daoism". In Zalta, Edward N.; Nodelman, Uri (eds.). Stanford Encyclopedia of Philosophy (Summer 2025 ed.).
- Harris, Eirik Lang (2016). The Shenzi Fragments. New York: Columbia University Press. ISBN 9780231542166.
- Jiang, Tao (2021). Origins of Moral-political Philosophy in Early China. Oxford: Oxford University Press. ISBN 978-0-19-760347-5.
- Klein, Esther (2010). "Were There "Inner Chapters" in the Warring States? A New Examination of Evidence about the Zhuangzi". T'oung Pao. 96 (4/5): 299–369. JSTOR 41354706.
- Lewis, Mark Edward (1999). Writing and Authority in Early China. State University of New York Press. doi:10.1353/pew.2001.0006. ISBN 978-0-7914-4114-5.
- Liu Xiaogan (1995). Classifying the Zhuangzi Chapters. Michigan Monographs in Chinese Studies, vol. 65. Ann Arbor: University of Michigan Press. doi:10.3998/mpub.19186. ISBN 9780472901340.
- Liu, Xiaogan (2014). Xiaogan Liu (ed.). Dao Companion to Daoist Philosophy. Springer. ISBN 9789048129270.
- Lundahl, Bertil (1992). Lundahl, Bertil (ed.). Han Fei Zi: The Man and the Work. Institute of Oriental Languages, Stockholm University. ISBN 9789171530790.
- Major, John S. (1993). Heaven and Earth in Early Han Thought: Chapters Three, Four and Five of the Huainanzi. Albany: State University of New York Press.
- Carson, Michael; Loewe, Michael (1993). "Lü shih ch'un ch'iu 呂氏春秋". In Loewe, Michael (ed.). Early Chinese Texts: A Bibliographical Guide. Berkeley: Society for the Study of Early China; Institute of East Asian Studies, University of California Berkeley. pp. 324–30. ISBN 1-55729-043-1.
- Knoblock, John and Riegel, Jeffrey. 2000. The Annals of Lü Buwei: A Complete Translation and Study. Stanford: Stanford University Press. ISBN 0-8047-3354-6.
- Major, John S. (2010). The Huainanzi A Guide to the Theory and Practice of Government in Early Han China. Columbia University Press. ISBN 978-0-231-52085-0.
- Pines, Yuri (2009). Envisioning Eternal Empire. University of Hawaii Press. ISBN 978-0-8248-3275-9.
- Pines, Yuri (2012b). "Alienating Rhetoric in the Book of Lord Shang and its Moderation". Extrême-Orient Extrême-Occident. 34. Presses Universitaires de Vincennes: 79–110. doi:10.4000/extremeorient.254. ISBN 9782842923525.
- Pines, Yuri (2023). "Legalism in Chinese Philosophy". In Zalta, Edward N.; Nodelman, Uri (eds.). Stanford Encyclopedia of Philosophy (Summer 2023 ed.).
  - Pines, Yuri (2023f). "2.1 Evolutionary view of History". In Zalta, Edward N.; Nodelman, Uri (eds.). Legalism in Chinese Philosophy. Stanford Encyclopedia of Philosophy (Summer 2023 ed.).
- Pines, Yuri (2024). Dao Companion to China's fa Tradition. Hebrew University of Jerusalem: Springer. ISBN 9789048129270.
  - Pines, Yuri (2024b), Chapter 1. Shang Yang and The Book of Lord Shang. In: Pines, Y. (eds) Dao Companion to China's fa Tradition (PDF), Springer, Cham, pp. 23–56, doi:10.2307/600068, JSTOR 600068
  - Lewis, Mark Edward. "Chapter 11 The Ruler in the Polity of Objective Standards". In Pines (2024), pp. 315-349.
- Sellmann, James D. 2002. Timing and Rulership in Master Lü's Spring and Autumn Annals (Lüshi chunqiu). Albany: State University of New York Press.
- Ritchie, Jennifer Lundin (2010). An investigation into the Guodian Laozi. University of British Columbia. doi:10.14288/1.0069902.
- Ryden, Edmund (1997). The Yellow Emperor's Four Canons: A Literary Study and Edition of the Text from Mawangdui. Taipei: Kuangchi Press. ISBN 978-9575462925.
- Schwartz, Benjamin (1985). The World of Thought in Ancient China. Harvard: Harvard University Press. ISBN 978-0-674-96191-3.
- Sellmann, James D. (March 2002). Timing and Rulership in Master Lü's Spring and Autumn Annals (Lüshi chunqiu). SUNY series in Chinese Philosophy and Culture. Albany: State University of New York Press. ISBN 0-7914-5232-8.
- Smith, Kidder (2003). "Sima Tan and the Invention of Daoism, "Legalism," et cetera". The Journal of Asian Studies. 62 (1): 129–156. doi:10.2307/3096138. JSTOR 3096138.
- Yang, Suzanne Xiao (2013). China in UN Security Council Decision-making on Iraq. Routledge. ISBN 9780415617697 – via Google Books.
- Zhu, Zhirong (2024). A Survey of Chinese Literature. Springer Nature Singapore. ISBN 9789819734221 – via Google Books.
