= Commentaries of the Three Scholars =

Commentaries on Sima Qian's Shiji

- Traditional Chinese: 史記三家註
- Simplified Chinese: 史记三家注
- Literal meaning: Three Commentaries on the Shiji
Transcriptions
Standard Mandarin
- Hanyu Pinyin: Shǐjì sānjiā zhù

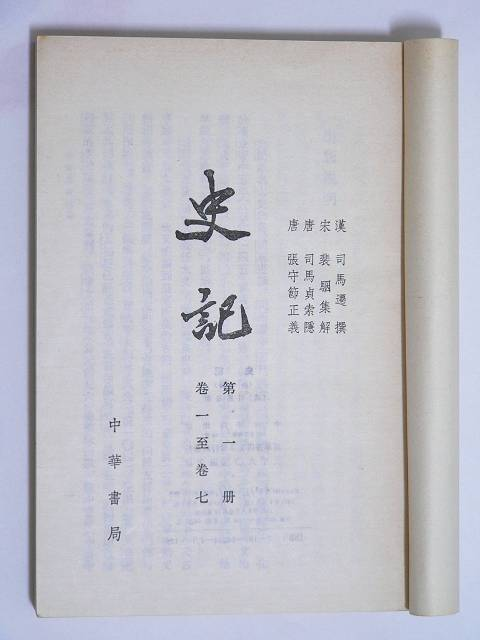
Title page of the Shiji (with the Three Commentaries) in an edition of the Zhonghua Book Company (1982)

The Commentaries of the Three Scholars (simplified Chinese: 三家注; traditional Chinese: 三家註; pinyin: Sānjiā zhù) or Three Commentaries on the Shiji (simplified Chinese: 史记三家注; traditional Chinese: 史記三家註; pinyin: Shǐjì sānjiā zhù) are the three most important traditional exegeses on the Shiji (Records of the Grand Historian or The Grand Scribe's Records, etc.), the monumental history written by Sima Qian (ca. 145–86 BCE) in the Han dynasty. The three commentary works, composed between the fifth and eighth centuries CE, form the basis of most received editions of the Shiji and are usually incorporated directly into its text in modern annotated versions.

== The Three Commentaries ==
The term sanjia zhu (三家注) refers to the following works:

- Shiji jijie (史記集解) by Pei Yin (裴駰; fl. 438), in 80 juan (scrolls). Pei’s work collects and harmonizes earlier glosses and interpretations of the Shiji.
- Shiji suoyin (史記索隱) by Sima Zhen (司馬貞; fl. 745), in 30 juan. Sima’s commentary supplements the original text and attempts to fill in missing passages, offering genealogical and textual clarifications.
- Shiji zhengyi (史記正義) by Zhang Shoujie (張守節; fl. 725–735), also in 30 juan. Zhang’s edition provides philological notes and aims at a “correct meaning” (zhengyi) through systematic comparison with other classical sources.

Although these works were originally written independently, they came to be transmitted together and are commonly integrated into the corresponding chapters of the Shiji in traditional editions. The Sanjia zhu collectively form the foundation of the standard annotated text.

The Three Commentaries have had a profound influence on the study and transmission of the Shiji. Virtually all later scholars of early Chinese historiography rely on the composite Sanjia zhu version as the authoritative text. Modern critical editions and translations continue to cite these commentaries extensively.

The work Shiji zhiyi 史记志疑 (Records of Doubtful Passages in the Grand Scribe’s Records) of Liang Yusheng 梁玉绳 (1745-1819) f.e. was one of the works which continued and further developed the exegetical tradition during the Qing dynasty.

== See also ==
- Shiji
- Sima Qian
- Chinese historiography

== Bibliography ==
- Nienhauser, William H., Jr.: Ssu-ma Ch'ien, The Grand Scribe's Records. Volume 1: The Basic Annals of Pre-Han China, Bloomington (Indiana University Press) 1994, ISBN 0-253-34021-7
- David R. Knechtges and Taiping Chang (eds.), Ancient and Early Medieval Chinese Literature: A Reference Guide, Part Two (Leiden: Brill, 2013), vol. 2, p. 897 ff.
- Zhu Zhengyi 朱正义: Shiji sanjia zhu《史记》三家注, in: Zhongguo yuyanxue yaoji jieti . Qilu shushe 齐鲁书社, Jinan 1991, ISBN 7-5333-0210-9
