= Lu Weiyi =

Lu Weiyi may refer to:

- Michael Loewe, Chinese name Lǔ Wéiyī 鲁惟一, British sinologist
- Mark Edward Lewis, Chinese name Lù Wēiyí 陆威仪, American sinologist
