= Gao You =

Han Chinese historian, philosopher and politician

- Traditional Chinese: 高誘
- Simplified Chinese: 高诱
Transcriptions
Standard Mandarin
- Hanyu Pinyin: Gāo Yòu
- Wade–Giles: Kao Yu

Gao You (c. 168–212) was a Chinese historian, philosopher, and politician during the Eastern Han dynasty under its last emperor and the warlord Cao Cao.

== Life ==
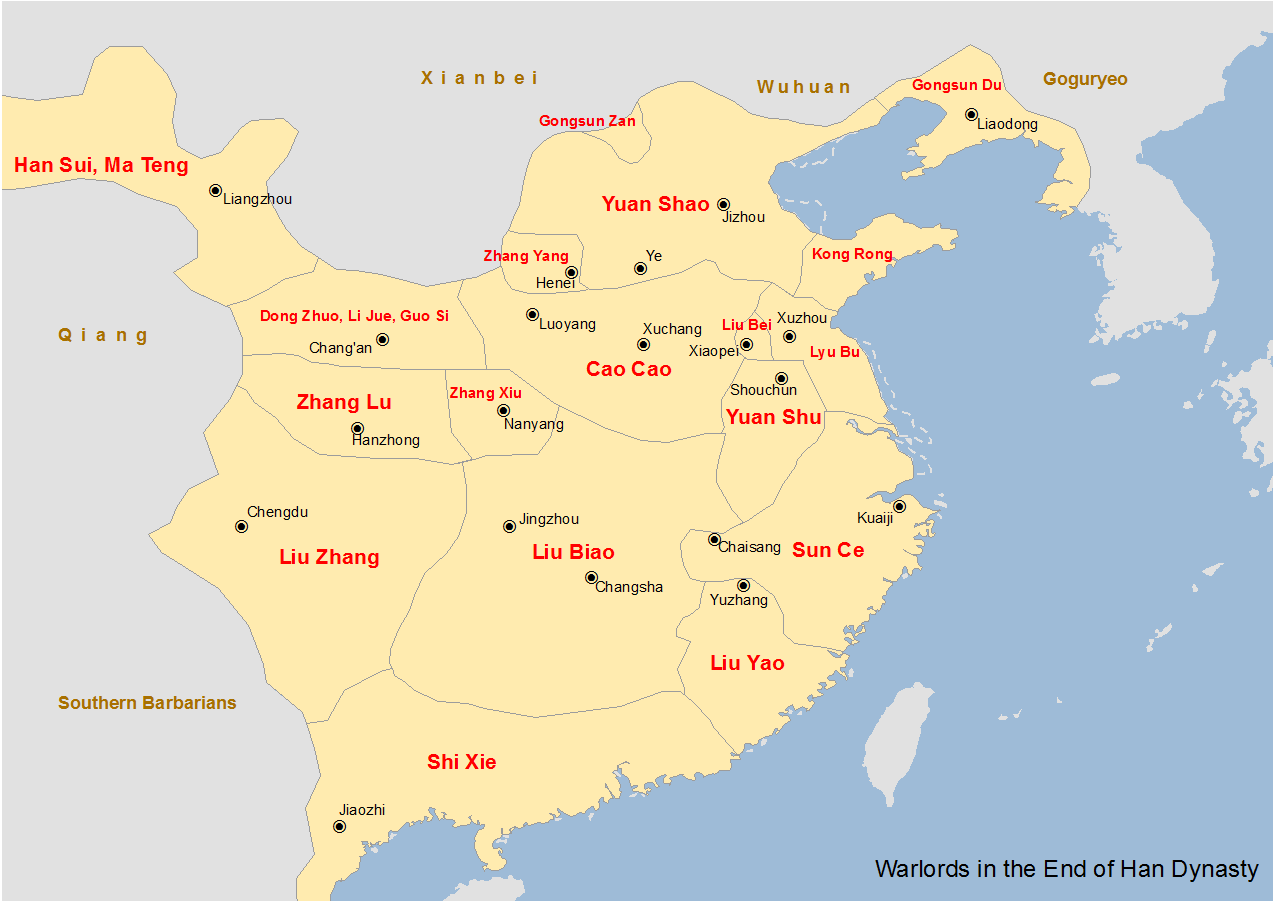
Territory of the warlords of Han China in the 190s. Gao You served in the administration of Cao Cao's territory, which later became the Kingdom of Wei.

Gao You was born in Zhuo Commandery (涿郡, Zhuōjùn; present-day Zhuozhou, Hebei) around AD 168. He studied with one of the area's preëminent scholars at the time, Lu Zhi. Lu was known for his work with texts concerning Chinese rituals and for his assistance in compiling the History of the Eastern Han (t 東觀漢記, s 东观汉记, Dōngguān Hànjì). His other students included Liu Bei, the future king of Shu, and Gongsun Zan, another regional warlord of the era. Gao's schooling was interrupted by the Yellow Turban Rebellion in AD 184.

Gao was working in Xuchang in the Capital Construction Office in AD 205 when he received his first post as magistrate of Puyang in the Eastern Commandery (t 東郡, s 东郡, Dōngjùn). This was about 10 kilometers (6.2 mi) south of the location of the present county-level city of Puyang in Henan. He later held some other mid-level appointments under Cao Cao, who ruled northern China in the name of the Han emperor until his death in 220.

Gao died in AD 212.

== Works ==
Gao's work dates mostly to the Jian'an Era (AD 196–220) of the Xian Emperor, the last emperor of the Eastern Han dynasty. Gao wrote commentaries on the Spring and Autumn Annals ordered by Lü Buwei; the Classics of Filial Piety and of Mountains and Seas; the Huainanzi; The Strategies of the Warring States; Discourse Weighed in the Balance; and the collected works of the philosopher Mencius.

Gao began his Notes on the Huainanzi (《淮南子注》, Huáinánzi Zhù) while studying under Lu and then completed his full commentary in AD 212. The Huainanzi had become important by his time because it was used to "verify" or "test" the genuineness of editions and commentaries of other classics. Charles Le Blanc (1935) argues that the phrasing of Gao's preface to his edition of the Huainanzi indicates that still had notes from his former teacher to consult; he also argues that Gao's commentary presumably incorporates the highlights of the otherwise lost work by Lu's own teacher Ma Rong.

By the time he finished his work on the Huainanzi, Gao had also already completed his notes on the Classic of Filial Piety and the collected works of Mencius. The latter is now lost.

Gao wrote his commentary on Master Lü's Spring and Autumn Annals next, presumably under the influence of Lu's own work on that text. Most of his preface consists of a biography of its chief editor, the Qin chancellor Lü Buwei. This account mostly repeats the biography of Lü found in Sima Qian's Records of the Grand Historian. He defends the work's importance—equating it to Liu An's Huainanzi, Yang Xiong's Model Sayings, and the collected works of Xun Kuang and Mencius—by reference to its inclusion in the official bibliographies compiled by Liu Xiang and Liu Xin.

Gao's commentary on the Strategies of the Warring States appears to have been its first. It is now lost, except for the parts that were included in the later Song-era commentary by Yao Hong.

== Legacy ==
Current editions of the Huainanzi derive in part from copies of Gao's commentaries on it. He commented on all 21 chapters of the original text, but only 13 survive in full. Although the authenticity and completeness of the eight chapters now taken from Xu Shen's alleged commentary are both questioned, Gao's chapters are thought to represent survivals of a genuine copy of the original text. The sinologist Victor Mair considers Gao You responsible for the current organization of the Strategies of the Warring States.

Gao's commentaries on the Huainanzi and Master Lü's Spring and Autumn Annals include numerous asides on the pronunciation of certain characters, particularly in his local dialect. His notes on the Huainanzi also includes material on the peculiarities of the usual dialect in the former area of Chu. Baxter and Sagart have used some of these notes in their reconstruction of the pronunciation of old Chinese.

Gao's note that his copy of Master Lü's Spring and Autumn Annals, which he considered in "poor condition", consisted of 173,054 characters is significant to scholarship concerning that text, since it makes his edition about a third longer than any currently existing.
