= Zhang Shoujie =

Historian from China

Zhang Shoujie (simplified Chinese: 张守节; traditional Chinese: 張守節; pinyin: Zhāng Shǒujié; Wade–Giles: Chang Shou-chieh; fl. 725–735) was a Chinese scholar of the Tang dynasty. He was the compiler of Rectified Interpretations of the Shiji (Shiji zhengyi, 史记正义 /史記正義; in 30 juan), often abbreviated as Zhengyi (正義).

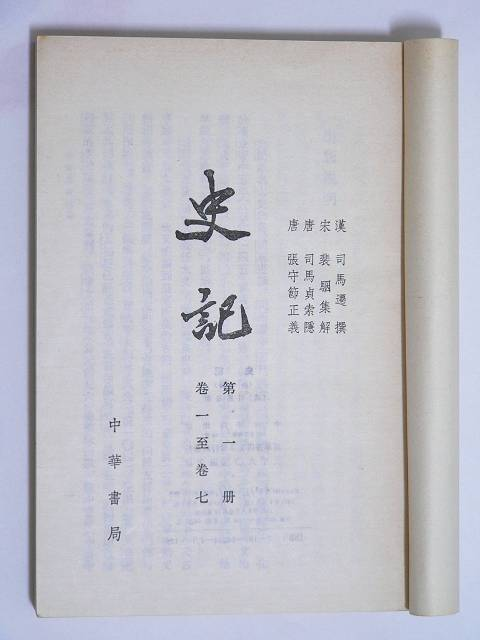
Title page of the Shiji in an edition of the Zhonghua Book Company (1982)

This work is an important commentary on the Shiji (Records of the Grand Historian) and is regarded as one of the “Commentaries of the Three Scholars” (sanjia zhu 三家注), i.e. of Pei Yin, Sima Zhen, and Zhang Shoujie.

In detail, these works of the Shiji sanjia zhu《史记》三家注) are the three commentaries known as Sanjia zhu 三家注 (Commentaries of the Three Scholars), which are from Pei Yin 裴駰 (5th cent.), Shiji jijie 史记集解 / 史記集解; Sima Zhen 司馬貞 (8th cent.), Shiji suoyin 史記索隱, and Zhang Shoujie 張守節 (8th cent.), Shiji zhengyi 史記正義.

Zhang Shoujie’s commentary provides a detailed explanation of the geographical names appearing in the Shiji. Since 1196, the Zhengyi, along with the commentaries of Pei Yin and Sima Zhen, has been included in its entirety as part of the standard text of the Shiji.

== See also ==
- Sima Zhen

== Bibliography ==
- Nienhauser, William H., Jr.: Ssu-ma Ch'ien, The Grand Scribe's Records. Volume 1: The Basic Annals of Pre-Han China, Bloomington (Indiana University Press) 1994, ISBN 0-253-34021-7
