= Eva Shang =

American entrepreneur

- Born: March 1996 (age 30)
- Education: Harvard University
- Occupations: Lawyer (Bar Admissions California, 2024) and entrepreneur
- Known for: Co-founder of Legalist
- Children: 3

Eva Shang (born March 1996) is an American lawyer who currently serves as general partner of Legalist. As an attorney, she also represents the Parkmerced Tenant Association and other tenants unions in San Francisco.

After founding Legalist at the age of 20, Eva led the company through Y Combinator’s S16 accelerator program. By 2025, Legalist had approximately $1.5 billion in assets under management.

Shang is a Harvard drop-out and was recognized by Forbes as one of its 30 under 30 in 2018.

Shang has been featured in several publications, including the Wall Street Journal, the New Yorker, the Boston Globe, and the Financial Times, highlighting her work at Legalist and her commitment to expanding access to justice.

== Early life and education ==
At age three, Shang emigrated from China to the U.S., growing up mostly in a Philadelphia suburb where her mother supported the family by working as an actuary. At age seven, Shang began editing her mother’s resumes and helped look after her younger sister, Melissa, who has a form of muscular dystrophy and uses a wheelchair. Together, they co-authored “Mia Lee is Wheeling Through Middle School”, a middle-grade novel starring a girl with a disability.

During her time at Harvard, Shang founded the Harvard Organization for Prison Education and Reform and tutored at prisons across Massachusetts. She also helped her sister petition toy maker American Girl to make a doll representing disabled children. Melissa Shang later became a Harvard undergraduate and a disability activist.

At age 20, Shang and Legalist co-founder Christian Haigh left Harvard and relocated to San Francisco, where they entered startup accelerator Y Combinator. In 2023, she passed the California bar exam after completing a four-year apprenticeship of reading law.

== Career ==
As Harvard undergraduates, Shang and Haigh developed an idea to generate profits from court cases by leveraging proprietary sourcing technology to identify those that were likely to win. An advisor recommended that they apply their database to litigation finance, which led to the development of Legalist’s flagship litigation finance strategy.

Legalist raised its inaugural fund of $10.25 million in 2017 and its second fund of $100 million in 2019. In 2022, Legalist launched its government receivables strategy. In early 2025, the firm provided over $100 million in financing to dozens of government contractors awaiting reimbursement from the federal government. These loans act as bridge financing for completed government projects awaiting reimbursement, often in cases where traditional banks have declined to offer credit.

By 2025, the company had approximately $1.5B of assets under management.

== Personal life ==
Shang resides in San Francisco with her husband, three children, and her labradoodle, the General Partner who was named after a legal term often used to describe a hedge-fund founder.
