= Jeffrey K. Riegel =

American sinologist (born 1945)

Jeffrey Kenneth Riegel (born 1945) is an American sinologist and university professor. He taught at the University of California, Berkeley (1979–2007), and the University of Sydney (2007–2017). He was one of the editors (Note: Together with Richard C. Rudolph, Albert E. Dien & Nancy T. Price.) of the Chinese archaeological abstracts (in the Monumenta Archaeologia series) and of the journal (Note: Together with David N. Keightley, Nancy Thompson Price.) Early China.

Together with John Knoblock he translated the classical philosophical books Lüshi chunqiu and Mozi.

Under the English title A Journal of My Misgivings: Liang Yusheng, Sima Qian, and the History of Qin he published a study on the Shiji zhiyi 史記志疑 (A Journal of My Misgivings about the Records of the Grand Historian) by Liang Yusheng 梁玉繩 (1745–1819), a detailed analysis and critique of the Shiji 史記 of Sima Qian 司馬遷 (b. 145 BCE).

== Publications (in selection) ==
- (with John Knoblock) The Annals of Lü Buwei. Stanford, 2000 (translation)
- (with John Knoblock) Mozi: A Study and Translation of the Ethical and Political Writings. China Research Monograph 68. Berkeley: Institute of East Asian Studies, 2013 (translation)
- A Journal of My Misgivings: Liang Yusheng, Sima Qian, and the History of Qin. China Research Monograph 79. Institute of East Asian Studies, University of California, Berkeley 2023
- "Li chi" and "Ta Tai Li chi", in: Michael Loewe, ed. Early Chinese Texts: A Bibliographical Guide. Berkeley: Society for the Study of Early China/Institute of East Asian Studies 1993, 456-459.
