= Legalist =

American investment firm

Legalist, Inc.
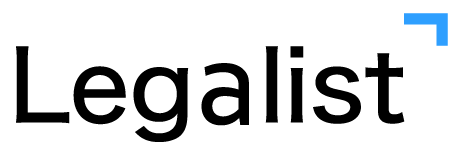
- Company type: Private company
- Industry: Financial services
- Founded: 2016
- Founders: Eva Shang, CEO; Christian Haigh
- Headquarters: California, United States
- AUM: $1.5 billion
- Website: www.legalist.com

Legalist, Inc. is an American investment firm that specializes in alternative assets in the private credit industry. Currently, the firm manages approximately $1.5 billion across three separate strategies: litigation finance, bankruptcy (debtor-in-possession or DIP) financing, and government receivables lending.

The firm’s clients include institutional investors such as endowments, foundations, hospitals, insurance companies, and family offices.

== History ==
The company was founded in 2016 by Harvard University undergraduates, Eva Shang and Christian Haigh, and was part of that year's Summer Y Combinator Demo Day.

In November 2017, Forbes Magazine included Legalist's founders in its "30 Under 30" Law & Policy list and reported that Legalist had raised $10.25 million over the summer.

In September 2019, The Wall Street Journal reported that Legalist had raised and closed its second fund of $100 million.

In April 2020, AngelList named Legalist among the 52 best startups to watch out for.

In March 2021, Reuters reported that Legalist had raised $50 million for its first bankruptcy fund.

In August 2022, Legalist managed approximately $750 million across three distinct private credit strategies: litigation finance, bankruptcy financing, and government receivables lending.

As of July 2025, Legalist manages approximately across $1.5 billion across its three strategies. This growth was driven by the company securing a new group of clients in the form of U.S. government contractors who recently lost support from the Department of Government Efficiency (DoGE).
