= Sima Tan =

Chinese astrologer and historian (c. 165–110 BCE)

- 司馬談
- Born: 165 BCE; Longmen, Han dynasty (now Hejin, Shanxi)
- Died: 110 BCE (aged 55); Luoyang, Han dynasty
- Occupations: Astrologist, astronomer, historian
- Relatives: Sima Xi (father); Sima Qian (son)

Sima Tan (traditional Chinese: 司馬談; simplified Chinese: 司马谈; pinyin: Sīmǎ Tán; Wade–Giles: Ssu-ma T'an; c. 165–110 BCE) was a Chinese astrologist, astronomer, and historian during the Western Han dynasty. His work Records of the Grand Historian was completed by his son Sima Qian, who is considered the founder of Chinese historiography.

== Family ==
Sima Tan was a descendant of the mythological figures Gaoyang and Chongli (Gaoyang's son). Their family held served as xiaguan (夏官; "officers of summer") for generations in the reigns of the mythical emperors Yao and Shun and through the Xia and Shang dynasties. During the Zhou dynasty, officials holding the appointment of xiaguan oversaw military affairs and were collectively known as "sima". Cheng-bo Xiufu (程伯休甫), a descendant of Chongli (Zhurong), helped King Xuan of the Zhou dynasty consolidate his rule over his kingdom. In return, the king rewarded Cheng-bo Xiufu to uesd "Sima"(the official position name that Cheng-bo Xiufu was currently holding) as his family name. So Chengbo Xiufu and his descendants adopted Sima as their family name. The descendants of Cheng-bo Xiufu went some to Zhao, some to Qin. Sima Ang was a descendant of the branch that went to Zhao; Sima Tan was a descendant of the branch that went to Qin.

== Education and career ==
Sima Tan studied astronomy with Tang Du, the I Ching under Yang He, and Daoism under Master Huang.

He was appointed to the office of Court Astronomer (Chinese: 太史令; pinyin: tài shǐ lìng) at age 25 in 140 BCE, a position which he held until his death. Although Sima Tan began writing the Records of the Grand Historian (Shiji), he died before it was finished; it was completed by his son, Sima Qian. The year of Sima Tan's death (110 BCE) was the year of the great imperial sacrifice fengshan (zh:封禅) by Emperor Han Wudi, for which the emperor appointed another person to the rank of fangshi, bypassing Sima, probably causing him much consternation.

== Six schools ==
An essay by Sima Tan has survived within the Records of the Grand Historian. The essay is the last of the Shiji, called Yaozhi or Essential Points. It discusses the strengths and weakness of six kinds of governance. Using the concept of 'Jia', which can mean "expert" but likely meant "family", the essay coined the categories of Yin-Yangjia, Fajia, Mingjia and Daojia. The idea of Yin-Yang already existed, but all Han dynasty thought involves yin-yang thinking, even the military has it. Primarily an argument for the Daojia, it did not necessarily occur to Tan that anyone would later use them as historical categories, or put people under them. As new categories, Tan's contemporaries probably considered his Jia novel.

- Confucianism (儒家 Rú jiā)
- Daoism (道家 Dào jiā)
- Legalism (法家 Fǎ jiā)
- Mohism (墨家 Mò jiā)
- School of Names (名家 Míng jiā)
- School of Naturalists (陰陽家/阴阳家 Yīnyáng jiā) (central figure Zou Yan)

Together with Mohism and Confucianism, he compares their purported strengths and weaknesses in promotion of what he dubs the Daojia or Dao school, taking the "essential points" of the others. Tan's descriptions of the Jia are all flawed, orbiting the characteristically 'empty' Daojia, which includes a description of a court of ministers with a Wu wei semi-inactive ruler. Its description, and the Shiji more generally, would suggest the Simas prefer a court with a wu wei semi-inactive ruler in a time when the central government was expanding.

Neither Sima Tan or Sima Qian name anyone under them. Likely popular by their time, imperial archivists Liu Xiang (77–6BCE) and Liu Xin named the 'schools' relevant texts, using the categories in the imperial library a hundred years after Sima Qians death. Liu Xin connects them with purported ancient Zhou dynasty departments. Daojia comes to mean something like Daoism around the same time. They become categories of texts in book catalogues, namely the Han states' own Book of Han under Ban Gu.

Those later termed Daoists likely did not early know each other. While the later part of the Zhuangzi would seem familiar with the Daodejing, the earlier first part does not demonstrate familiarity with it. Although disconnected, as later used the Mingjia school of names would at least seem to represent an actual social category interacted with by the Mohists, earlier referred to by the Zhuangzi as debaters. Taken as having a common interest in disputative theories of language, they otherwise have different philosophies.

== Fajia ==
Connected with a department of prisons, Fajia comes to mean something like Legalism, which contains Shang Yang and figures Sima Qian had described as rooted in Huang-Lao, or "Yellow Emperor and Laozi (Daoism)". Fa standards would seem a major element of their philosophy, and by his own words, Sima Qian does most favour Laozi over Shen Buhai or Han Fei. But it is questionable if Sima Qian himself believed or at least intended that Shen Buhai, Shen Dao and Han Fei should go under Fajia, or he might have either used his father's categories, or at least discussed Shen Buhai and Han Fei alongside Shang Yang rather than Laozi and Zhuang Zhou. Shen Dao is mentioned alongside Jixia academy scholars. Giving the harsh penal Shang Yang his own individual chapter, if anything Sima Qian was probably opposed to his combination with any of the others.

Although a modern Sinologist might consider a historical usage of the categories revisionist, to its credit, the Book of Han only presents their groupings as theoretical; Feng Youlan chose to take it as a legitimate attempt at historical theory. Emphasizing philosophical differences with the Confucians, Sinologist Herrlee G. Creel argued that it might have been misleading to list Shen Buhai together with Shang Yang under Fajia, with a combination of the two more common after the Han Feizi. But Liu Xiang at least readily recounts that, unlike Shang Yang, Shen Buhai vacillated against punishments, and they would not seem to have attempted to individually obfuscate him.

== See also ==
- Daoism
- Sima Qian
- Shiji
