= William H. Nienhauser Jr. =

American academic (born 1943)

William Henry Nienhauser Jr. (Chinese: 倪豪士; pinyin: Ní Háoshì, born 1943) is an American academic, who has been Halls-Bascom Professor of Classical Chinese Literature at the University of Wisconsin–Madison since 1995.

== Life and career ==
Nienhauser was born in St. Louis, Missouri. He married his high school sweetheart, Judith Brockway Nienhauser in 1961; they have two children and three grandchildren. After a semester of study at Fenn College, he enlisted in the U.S. Army as a private; he first studied Chinese at the Army Language School (1963–64), then went on to major in Chinese literature at Indiana University Bloomington and Bonn University (1968–69), receiving his BA (Phi Beta Kappa, summa cum laude), MA and Ph.D. from Indiana (1966, 1968, and 1973). Although he began working on modern Chinese literature under Professor Liu Wuji 柳無忌 (1907-2002), the year he spent studying Tang literature under Professor Peter Olbricht at Bonn directed him towards working on Liu Zongyuan 柳宗元 (773-819) and Tang fiction.

Upon returning to Bloomington, Nienhauser taught German language as a visiting assistant professor in the Germanic Languages program at Indiana University. In 1973 the volume of essays Nienhauser edited on Liu Zongyuan was published in the Twayne World Author Series and that same year he took up a position as assistant professor in the Department of East Asian Languages and Literature at the University of Wisconsin–Madison. In 1979 his P'i Jih-hsiu appeared (Twayne) and in 1985 and 1998 the two volumes of the Indiana Companion to Traditional Chinese Literature. The following year he began to edit what has now become nine volumes translating and commenting on 105 chapters of Sima Qian's Shiji 史記 in cooperation with nearly 70 scholars from the U.S., Germany, China, Japan, Romania, and Italy. The project continues in 2025 volume 6 recently published. Promoted to full professor in 1983, in 1995 he was made Halls-Bascom Professor. In 2020 he retired. Later that year he won the Special Book Award of China as the only American among fifteen international winners for his work on the Shiji.

His publications include the two-volume Indiana Companion to Traditional Chinese Literature and eight volumes of translations from the Shiji (The Grand Scribe's Records). In 1979 Nienhauser was a founding editor of Chinese Literature: Essays, Articles, Reviews (CLEAR), which he edited until 2009. He has taught or conducted research at several universities in Germany, at Academia Sinica in Taiwan, at Kyoto University, National Taiwan University, Peking University, and Nanyang Technical University (Singapore). In addition to grants from the American Council of Learned Societies, Fulbright-Hays, the German Academic Exchange Service (DAAD), the German Research Foundation, the Alexander von Humboldt Foundation, the Japan Foundation, and the National Endowment for the Humanities, in 2003 he was awarded a Forschungspreis (Research Prize) for lifetime achievement from the Humboldt Foundation.

== Works ==
- William H. Nienhauser Jr. (1973). Liu Tsung-yüan. New York: Twayne Publishers.
- William H. Nienhauser Jr. (1979). Pʻi Jih-hsiu. Twayne's World Authors Series. ISBN 0-8057-6372-4.
- William H. Nienhauser, Jr., ed. (1994– ). The Grand Scribe's Records, 9 volumes. Bloomington: Indiana University Press. Ongoing translation, and being translated out of order. As of 2026, translates 112 out of 130 chapters, with only the Tables and Treatises sections left untranslated.
  - I. The Basic Annals of Pre-Han China (2018), ISBN 978-0-253-03855-5.
  - II. The Basic Annals of the Han Dynasty (2018), ISBN 978-0-253-03909-5.
  - V. part 1. The Hereditary Houses of Pre-Han China (2006), ISBN 978-0-253-34025-2.
  - V. part 2. The Hereditary Houses, II (2026), ISBN 978-0-253-07647-2.
  - VI. The Hereditary Houses, III (2022), ISBN 978-0-253-06418-9. (edited with Masha Kobzeva)
  - VII. The Memoirs of Pre-Han China (1995), ISBN 978-0-253-34027-6.
  - VIII. The Memoirs of Han China, Part I (2008), ISBN 978-0-253-34028-3.
  - IX. The Memoirs of Han China, Part II (2010), ISBN 978-0-253-35590-4.
  - X. The Memoirs of Han China, Part III (2016), ISBN 978-0-253-01931-8.
  - XI. The Memoirs of Han China, Part IV (2019), ISBN 978-0-253-04610-9.
- William H. Nienhauser, Jr. Tang Dynasty Tales, v. 1 and 2 (2010, 2016). Singapore: World Scientific.
- Nienhauser. Biographical Dictionary of Tang Literature (2022). Written or revised, translated and edited with Michael Naparstek. Bloomington: Indiana University Press.
