= Sima Zhen =

Chinese historian (679–732)

- Traditional Chinese: 司馬貞
- Simplified Chinese: 司马贞
Transcriptions
Standard Mandarin
- Hanyu Pinyin: Sīmǎ Zhēn
- Wade–Giles: Ssu^{1}-ma^{3} Chen^{1}

Sima Zhen (Chinese: 司馬貞; Wade–Giles: Ssu-ma Chen; 679–732), courtesy name Zizheng (Tzu-cheng; 子正), was a Tang dynasty Chinese historian born in what is now Jiaozuo, Henan.

Sima Zhen was one of the most important commentators on the Shiji. His commentary is known as the Shiji Suoyin (史記索隱), which means "Seeking the Obscure in the Records of the Grand Historian".

== See also ==
- Zhang Shoujie
