= Mark Edward Lewis =

American historian and sinologist (born 1954)

- Born: September 25, 1954 (age 71)
- Other name: 陆威仪
- Education: University of Chicago
- Scientific career
- Fields: Chinese history
- Workplaces: Cambridge University; Stanford University
- Doctoral advisor: Ho Ping-ti

Mark Edward Lewis (Chinese: 陆威仪; pinyin: Lù Wēiyí; born September 25, 1954) is an American sinologist and historian of ancient China.

== Life and career ==
Lewis was born on September 25, 1954. He received his B.A., M.A., and Ph.D. from the University of Chicago and studied Chinese at the International Chinese Language Program (ICLP). His dissertation, entitled "The Imperial Transformation of Violence in Ancient China," was written under the Chinese-American historian Ho Ping-ti. He was a Junior Fellow in the Harvard University Society of Fellows.

Since 2002 he has been Kwoh-Ting Li Professor in Chinese Culture at Stanford University. Previously he was a Reader at the Faculty of Oriental Studies at the University of Cambridge.

He was a Humboldt Research Award Fellow for one year at the University of Muenster.

He created the Chinese Texts course, which is intended to teach students how to read Classical Chinese philosophy and history. The course uses texts from the Warring States and Early Han period, provides detailed analysis of the passages and how the translation was reached, and explains the uses of parallelism and rhythmic patterns in Classical Chinese.

== Monographs ==
- Honor and Shame in early China. Cambridge University Press, 2021.
- China’s Cosmopolitan Empire: The Tang Dynasty. The Belknap Press of Harvard University Press, 2009.
- China Between Empires: The Northern and Southern Dynasties. The Belknap Press of Harvard University Press, 2009.
- The Early Chinese Empires: Qin and Han. The Belknap Press of Harvard University Press, 2007. Awarded the Prix Stanislas Julien by the Académie des Inscriptions et Belles-Lettres of the Institut de France, 2009.
- The Flood Myths of Early China. State University of New York Press, 2006.
- The Construction of Space in Early China. State University of New York Press, 2006.
- Writing and Authority in Early China. State University of New York Press, 1999. Awarded the Prix Budget by the Académie des Inscriptions et Belles-Lettres of the Institut de France, 2002.
- Sanctioned Violence in Early China. State University of New York Press, 1990.
- Writing the World in the Family Instructions of the Yan Clan

== Articles ==
- "Early Imperial China, from the Qin and Han through the Tang." In Fiscal Regimes and the Political Economy of Premodern States. Ed. Andrew Monson and Walter Scheidel. Cambridge: Cambridge University Press, 2015.
- "Mothers and Sons in Early Imperial China." In Extrême Orient, Extrême Occident. 2012.
- "Swordsmanship and the Socialization of Violence in Early China," in From Athens to Beijing: West Meets East in the Olympic Games. Ed. Susan Brownell. New York: Athlone. 2012.
- "Historiography and Empire," in Oxford History of Historical Writing, Vol 1. Ed. Grant Hardy and Andrew Feldherr. Oxford: Oxford University Press, 2011. online
- "Evolution of the Shang Calendar," in Measuring the World and Beyond: The Archaeology of Early Quantification and Cosmology. Ed. Colin Renfrew and Iain Morley. Cambridge: Cambridge University Press, 2010.
- "The Mythology of Early China," in Rituels, pantheons et techniques: Histoire de la religion chinoise avant les Tang. Ed. John Lagerwey. Leiden: E. J. Brill, 2009.
- "Gift Exchange and Charity in Ancient China and the Roman Empire," in Institutions of Empire: Comparative Perspectives on Ancient Chinese and Mediterranean History. Ed. Walter Scheidel. Stanford: Stanford University Press, 2009.
- "Writing the World in the Family Instructions of the Yan Clan." Early Medieval China: Essays in Honor of Albert E. Dien Volumes 13-13: Part 1. 2007.
- "The Just War in Early China," in The Ethics of War in Asian Civilizations. Ed. Torkel Brekke. London: Routledge, 2006.
- "Writings on Warfare Found in Ancient Chinese Tombs," Sino-Platonic Papers 158 (August 2005).
- "Custom and Human Nature in Early China." Philosophy East and West 53:3 (July 2003).
- "Dicing and Divination in Early China." Sino-Platonic Papers. 121 (July 2002).
- "The Han Abolition of Universal Military Service," in Warfare in Chinese History. Ed. Hans van de Ven. E. J. Brill, 2000.
- "The City-State in Spring-and-Autumn China," in A Comparative Study of Thirty City-State Cultures. Ed. M. H. Hansen. Historisk-filosofiske Skrifter 21. The Royal Danish Academy of Sciences and Letters, 2000.
- "The Feng and Shan Sacrifices of Emperor Wu of the Han," in State and Court Ritual in China. Ed. Joseph McDermott. Cambridge University Press, 1999.
- "Political History of the Warring States," in The Cambridge History of Ancient China. Ed. Michael Loewe and Edward Shaughnessy. Cambridge University Press, 1999.
- "The Ritual Origins of the Warring State." Bulletin de l'École Française d'Extrême-Orient 84:2 (1997).
- "The Warring State in China as Institution and Idea," in War: A Cruel Necessity? Ed. Robert A. Hinde. I. B. Tauris, 1995.
- "Les rites comme trame de l'histoire," in Changement et idées de changement en Chine. Ed. Vivienne Alton. Institut des Hautes Études Chinoises, 1994.
- "The Suppression of the Sect of the Three Stages: Apocrypha as a Political Issue," in Chinese Buddhist Apocrypha. Ed. Robert Buswell, ed., University of Hawaii Press, 1990.
