= Shiji =

Historical account of ancient China

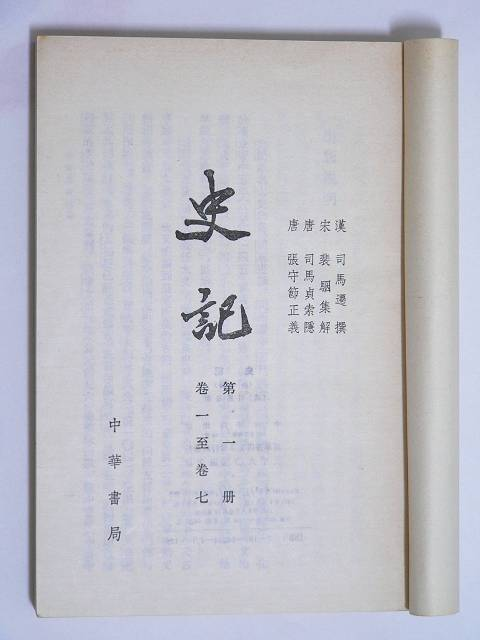
- 1982 printed edition by the Zhonghua Book Company
- Author: Sima Qian
- Language: Classical Chinese
- Subject: History
- Publication date: c. 91 BC
- Publication place: China

Chinese name
- Traditional Chinese: 史記
- Simplified Chinese: 史记
- Hanyu Pinyin: Shǐjì
- Literal meaning: "Historical Records"
Transcriptions
Standard Mandarin
- Hanyu Pinyin: Shǐjì
- Wade–Giles: Shih^{3}-chi^{4}
- IPA: [ʂɻ̩̀.tɕî]
Wu
- Romanization: Sy-ci
Yue: Cantonese
- Yale Romanization: Sí-gei
- Jyutping: Si2-gei3
- IPA: [si˧˥ kej˧]
Southern Min
- Hokkien POJ: Sú-kì
Middle Chinese
- Middle Chinese: ʂí-kì
Old Chinese
- Baxter–Sagart (2014): s-rəʔ C.krəʔ-s

Alternative Chinese name
- Traditional Chinese: 太史公書
- Simplified Chinese: 太史公书
- Hanyu Pinyin: Tàishǐgōng shū
- Literal meaning: "Records of the Grand Historian"
Transcriptions
Standard Mandarin
- Hanyu Pinyin: Tàishǐgōng shū
- Wade–Giles: T'ai^{4}-shih^{3}-kung^{1} shu^{1}
- IPA: [tʰâɪ.ʂɻ̩̀.kʊ́ŋ ʂú]
Yue: Cantonese
- Yale Romanization: Taisígōng syū
- Jyutping: Tai3-si2-gong1 syu1
Southern Min
- Hokkien POJ: Thài-sú-kong su
Middle Chinese
- Middle Chinese: Tʰài ʂí kuwng sho
Old Chinese
- Baxter–Sagart (2014): *l̥ˤat-s s-rəʔ C.qˤung s-ta

Vietnamese name
- Vietnamese alphabet: Sử ký
- Chữ Hán: 史記

Korean name
- Hangul: 사기
Transcriptions
- Revised Romanization: Sagi

Japanese name
- Kanji: 史記
Transcriptions
- Romanization: Shiki

The Shiji (traditional Chinese: 史記; simplified Chinese: 史记; pinyin: Shǐjì; lit. 'Historical Records'), also known as Records of the Grand Historian or The Grand Scribe's Records (traditional Chinese: 太史公書; simplified Chinese: 太史公书; pinyin: Tàishǐgōng shū), is a Chinese historical text that is the first of the Twenty-Four Histories of imperial China. It was written during the late 2nd and early 1st centuries BC by the early Han dynasty historian Sima Qian, building upon work begun by his father Sima Tan. The work covers a 2,500-year period from the age of the legendary Yellow Emperor to the reign of Emperor Wu of Han in the author's own time, and describes the world as it was known to the Chinese of the Western Han dynasty.

The Shiji has been called a "foundational text in Chinese civilization". Following Confucius and Qin Shi Huang, "Sima Qian was one of the creators of Imperial China; by providing definitive biographies, he effectively shaped the enduring images of these two earlier figures." The Shiji set the model for all subsequent dynastic histories of China. In contrast to Western historiographical conventions, the Shiji does not treat history as "a continuous, sweeping narrative", but rather breaks it up into smaller, overlapping units dealing with famous leaders, individuals, and major topics of significance.

== History ==
=== Title ===
The original title of the work, as given by the author in the postscript, is Taishigongshu (太史公書), or Records of the Grand Historian. However, the book was also known by a variety of other titles, including Taishigongji (太史公記) and Taishigongzhuan (太史公傳) in ancient times. Eventually, Shiji (史記), or Historical Records became the most commonly used title in Chinese. This title was originally used to refer to any general historical text, although after the Three Kingdoms period, (Note: The Three Kingdoms period scholar Wang Su (AD 195–256) appears to be among the earliest to apply the name Shiji to Sima Qian's work.) Shiji gradually began to be used exclusively to refer to Sima Qian's work. In English, the title is variously translated as Records of the Grand Historian, Historical Records, The Grand Scribe's Records, or Records of the Historian, although other titles are sometimes used.

=== Textual history ===
The work that became the Shiji was begun by Sima Tan, who was Grand Historian (Tàishǐ 太史, also translated "Grand Scribe") of the Han dynasty court during the late 2nd century BC. Sima Tan drafted plans for the ambitious work and left behind some fragments and notes that may have been incorporated into the final text. After Sima's death in 110 BC, the Shiji was continued and completed by his son and successor Sima Qian, who is generally credited as the work's author. The exact date of the completion of the Shiji is unknown. It is certain that Sima Qian completed it before 86 BC, which was approximately the year he died, with one copy residing in the imperial capital of Chang'an (present-day Xi'an) and the other copy probably being stored in Sima's home.

Little is known about the early reception and circulation of the Shiji. Several 1st-century BC authors, such as the scholar Chu Shaosun (褚少孫; fl. 32–7 BC), added interpolations to it. Ten of the Shiji's original 130 chapters were lost in the Eastern Han period (AD 25–220) and seem to have been reconstructed later.

The first commentaries to the Shiji date from the Northern and Southern dynasties (420–589) and the early Tang dynasty (618–907). Most historical editions of the Shiji included the commentaries of Pei Yin (裴駰, 5th century), Sima Zhen (early 8th century), and Zhang Shoujie (early 8th century). The primary modern edition of the Shiji is the ten-volume Zhonghua Book Company edition published in 1959 (revised in 1982), which is based on an edition created in the early 1930s by the Chinese historian Gu Jiegang.

=== Manuscripts ===
Only two fragments of pre-Tang dynasty Shiji manuscripts have survived to the present, and both are held by the Ishiyama-dera temple in Ōtsu, Japan. Portions of nine Tang dynasty manuscripts survive: three fragments discovered among the Dunhuang manuscripts in the early 20th century, and six manuscripts preserved in Japanese temples and museums such as the Kōzan-ji temple in Kyoto and the Tōyō Bunko museum in Tokyo. Several woodblock printed editions of the Shiji survive, the earliest of which date to the Song dynasty (960–1279).

== Contents ==
Pages from volume eleven of a Ming dynasty printed edition of the Shiji

The Shiji is around 526,500 Chinese characters in length, making it four times longer than Thucydides' History of the Peloponnesian War and longer than the Hebrew Bible. Sima Qian conceived and composed his work in self-contained units, with a good deal of repetition between them. His manuscript was written on bamboo slips, with 24 to 36 characters each, and assembled into bundles of around 30 slips. Even after the manuscript was allowed to circulate or be copied, the work would have circulated as bundles of bamboo slips or small groups. Endymion Wilkinson calculates that there were probably between 466 and 700 bundles, whose total weight would have been 88–132 pounds (40–60 kg), which would have been difficult to access and hard to transport. Later copies on silk would have been much lighter, but also expensive and rare. Until the work was transferred to paper many centuries later, circulation would have been difficult and piecemeal, which accounts for many of the errors and variations in the text.

Sima Qian organized the chapters of the Shiji into five categories, which each comprise a section of the book.

=== "Basic Annals" ===
The "Basic Annals" (běnjì 本紀) make up the first 12 chapters of the Shiji, and are largely similar to records from the ancient Chinese court chronicle tradition, such as the Spring and Autumn Annals. The first five cover either periods, such as the Five Emperors, or individual dynasties, such as the Xia, Shang, and Zhou dynasties. The last seven cover individual rulers, starting with the First Emperor of Qin and progressing through the first emperors of the Han dynasty. In this section, Sima chose to also include de facto rulers of China, such as Xiang Yu and Empress Dowager Lü, while excluding rulers who never held any real power, such as Emperor Yi of Chu and Emperor Hui of Han.

=== "Tables" ===
Chapters 13 to 22 are the "Tables" (biǎo 表), which comprise one genealogical table and nine other chronological tables. They show reigns, important events, and royal lineages in table form, which Sima Qian stated that he did because "the chronologies are difficult to follow when different genealogical lines exist at the same time." Each table except the last one begins with an introduction to the period it covers.

=== "Treatises" ===
The "Treatises" (shū 書, sometimes called "Monographs") is the shortest of the five Shiji sections, and contains eight chapters (23–30) on the historical evolution of ritual, music, pitch pipes, the calendar, astronomy, sacrifices, rivers and waterways, and financial administration.

=== "Hereditary Houses" ===
The "Hereditary Houses" (shìjiā 世家) is the second largest of the five Shiji sections, and spans chapters 31 to 60. Within this section, the earlier chapters are very different in nature than the later chapters. Many of the earlier chapters are chronicle-like accounts of the leading states of the Zhou dynasty, such as the states of Qin and Lu, and two of the chapters go back as far as the Shang dynasty. The later chapters, which cover the Han dynasty, contain biographies.

=== "Ranked Biographies" ===
The "Ranked Biographies" (lièzhuàn 列傳, usually shortened to "Biographies") is the largest of the five Shiji sections, covering chapters 61 to 130, and accounts for 42% of the entire work. The 69 "Biographies" chapters mostly contain biographical profiles of about 130 outstanding ancient Chinese men, ranging from the moral paragon Boyi from the end of the Shang dynasty, to the legendary founder of Taoism, Laozi, to some of Sima Qian's near contemporaries. About 40 of the chapters are dedicated to one particular man, but some are about two related figures, while others cover small groups of figures who shared certain roles, such as assassins, caring officials, or Confucian scholars. Unlike most modern biographies, the accounts in the "Biographies" give profiles using anecdotes to depict morals and character, with "unforgettably lively impressions of people of many different kinds and of the age in which they lived." The "Biographies" have been popular throughout Chinese history, and have provided a large number of set phrases, or chengyu, still used in modern Chinese.

== Style ==
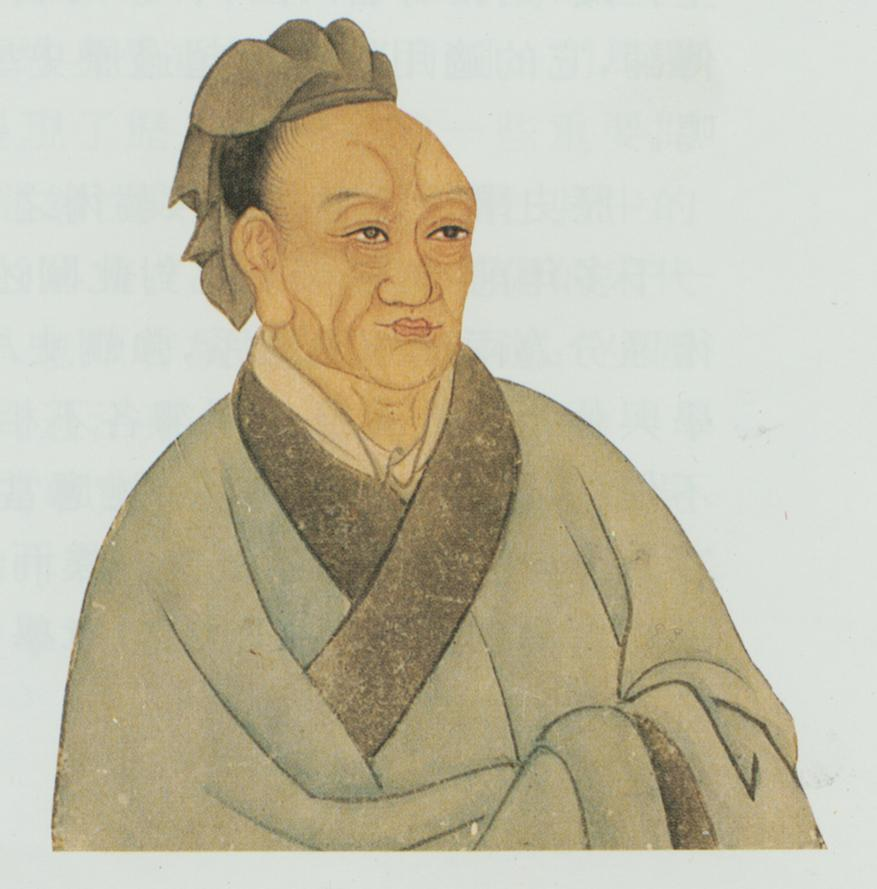
Sima Qian

Unlike subsequent official historical texts that adopted Confucian doctrine, proclaimed the divine rights of the emperors, and degraded any failed claimant to the throne, Sima Qian's more liberal and objective prose has been renowned and followed by poets and novelists. Most volumes of Liezhuan are vivid descriptions of events and persons. Sima Qian sought out stories from those who might have closer knowledge of certain historical events, using them as sources to balance the reliability and accuracy of historical records. For instance, the material on Jing Ke's attempt at assassinating the King of Qin incorporates an eye-witness account by Xia Wuju (夏無且), a physician to the king of Qin who happened to be attending the diplomatic ceremony for Jing Ke, and this account was passed on to Sima Qian by those who knew Xia.

It has been observed that the diplomatic Sima Qian has a way of accentuating the positive in his treatment of rulers in the Basic Annals, but slipping negative information into other chapters, and so his work must be read as a whole to obtain full information. For example, the information that Liu Bang (later Emperor Gaozu of Han), in a desperate attempt to escape in a chase from Xiang Yu's men, pushed his own children off his carriage to lighten it, is not given in the emperor's biography, but in the biography of Xiang Yu. He is also careful to balance the negative with the positive, for example, in the biography of Empress Dowager Lu which contains startling accounts of her cruelty, he points out at the end that, despite whatever her personal life may have been, her rule brought peace and prosperity to the country.

The vivid accounts of historical events recorded in the Shiji have made it a widely admired and frequently anthologized body of prose writing. Along with the Zuozhuan, the Shiji serves as a particularly rich source of chengyu (four-character idiomatic phrases used in modern Chinese prose and speech). The language of the Shiji, while broadly categorized as literary Chinese, is relatively accessible to contemporary students with only modest training in the literary language. In contrast to prose from later in the imperial period that utilize a fully fossilized literary standard modeled after the pre-Qin classics, the language of the Shiji still shows significant influences by the author's spoken language. This is evidenced by the appearance of certain grammatical innovations not found in pre-Qin writing and by the proliferation of disyllabic compounds. Disyllabic compounds became increasingly common in the spoken language of the Han dynasty and eventually replaced monosyllabic words as the most common form of vocabulary. In the opening sentence of the text (from the "Basic Annals of the Five Emperors"), for instance, Sima Qian uses the adjectives 敦敏 'sincere and astute' and 聰明 'intelligent' to describe the Yellow Emperor. Both of these disyllabic compounds remain in use in modern Chinese.

== Source materials ==
Sima's family were hereditary historians to the Han emperor. Sima Qian's father Sima Tan served as Grand Historian, and Sima Qian succeeded to his position. Thus he had access to the early Han dynasty archives, edicts, and records. Sima Qian was a methodical, skeptical historian who had access to ancient books, written on bamboo and wooden slips, from before the time of the Han dynasty. Many of the sources he used did not survive. He not only used archives and imperial records, but also interviewed people and traveled around China to verify information. In his first chapter, "Annals of the Five Emperors", he writes,

余嘗西至空桐，北過涿鹿，東漸於海，南浮江淮矣，至長老皆各往往稱黃帝、堯、舜之處，風教固殊焉，總之不離古文者近是。

I myself have travelled west as far as Kongtong, north past Zhuolu, east to the sea, and in the south I have sailed the Yangtze and Huai Rivers. The elders and old men of these various lands frequently pointed out to me the places where the Yellow Emperor, Yao, and Shun had lived, and in these places the manners and customs seemed quite different. In general those of their accounts which do not differ from the ancient texts seem to be near to the truth.

— Sima Qian, translation by Burton Watson

The Grand Historian used The Annals of the Five Emperors (五帝系諜) and the Classic of History as source materials to make genealogies from the time of the Yellow Emperor until that of the Gonghe regency (841–828 BC). Sima Qian often cites his sources. For example, in the first chapter, "Annals of the Five Emperors", he writes, "I have read the Spring and Autumn Annals and the Guoyu." In his 13th chapter, "Genealogical Table of the Three Ages", Sima Qian writes, "I have read all the genealogies of the kings (dieji 諜記) that exist since the time of the Yellow Emperor." In his 14th chapter, "Yearly Chronicle of the Feudal Lords", he writes, "I have read all the royal annals (chunqiu li pudie 春秋曆譜諜) up until the time of King Li of Zhou." In his 15th chapter, "Yearly Chronicle of the Six States", he writes, "I have read the Annals of Qin (qin ji 秦記), and they say that the Quanrong [a barbarian tribe] defeated King You of Zhou [ca 771 BC]."

In the 19th chapter, he writes, "I have occasion to read over the records of enfeoffment and come to the case of Wu Qian, the marquis of Bian...." (The father of Marquis Bian, Wu Rui, was named prince (王; wáng) of Changsha for his loyalty to Gaozu.) In his chapter on the patriotic minister and poet Qu Yuan, Sima Qian writes, "I have read [Qu Yuan's works] Li Sao, Tianwen ("Heaven Asking"), Zhaohun (summoning the soul), and Ai Ying (Lament for Ying)". In the 62nd chapter, "Biography of Guan and of Yan", he writes, "I have read Guan's Mu Min (牧民 - "Government of the People", a chapter in the Guanzi), Shan Gao ("The Mountains Are High"), Chengma (chariot and horses; a long section on war and economics), Qingzhong (Light and Heavy; i.e. "what is important"), and Jiufu (Nine Houses), as well as the Spring and Autumn Annals of Yanzi." In his 64th chapter, "Biography of Sima Rangju", the Grand Historian writes, "I have read Sima's Art of War." In the 121st chapter, "Biographies of Scholars", he writes, "I read the Imperial Decrees that encouraged education officials."

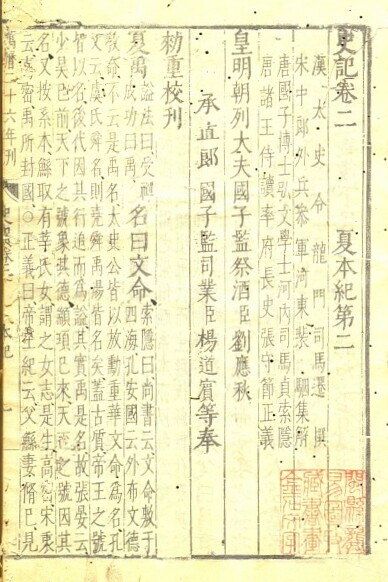
Chapter 2, Annals of Xia (Ming dynasty edition, 1598)

Sima Qian wrote of the problems with incomplete, fragmentary and contradictory sources. For example, he mentioned in the preface to chapter 15 that the chronicle records of the Zhou dynasty states kept in the royal archive were burnt by Qin Shi Huang because they contained criticisms and ridicule of the Qin state, and that the Qin annals were brief and incomplete. In the 13th chapter he mentioned that the chronologies and genealogies of different ancient texts "disagree and contradict each other throughout". In his 18th chapter, Sima Qian writes, "I have set down only what is certain, and in doubtful cases left a blank."

== Reliability and accuracy ==
Scholars have questioned the historicity of legendary kings of the ancient periods given by Sima Qian. Sima Qian began the Shiji with an account of the five rulers of supreme virtue, the Five Emperors, who modern scholars, such as those from the Doubting Antiquity School, believe to be originally local deities of the peoples of ancient China. Sima Qian sifted out elements of the supernatural and fantastic which seemed to contradict their existence as actual human monarchs, and was therefore criticized for turning myths and folklore into sober history.

However, according to Joseph Needham, who wrote in 1954 on Sima Qian's accounts of the kings of the Shang dynasty (c. 1600 – c. 1050 BC):

It was commonly maintained that Ssuma Chhien [Sima Qian] could not have adequate historical materials for his account of what had happened more than a thousand years earlier. One may judge of the astonishment of many, therefore, when it appeared that no less than twenty-three of the thirty rulers' names were to be clearly found on the indisputably genuine Anyang bones. It must be, therefore, that [Sima Qian] did have fairly reliable materials at his disposal—a fact which underlines once more the deep historical-mindedness of the Chinese—and that the Shang dynasty is perfectly acceptable.

— Joseph Needham

The list of kings from the Xia dynasty presented on Shiji also matches the one found in the Bamboo Annals, written during the Warring States period. The Bamboo Annals were written in the third century BC and rediscovered in 280 AD, being unknown to Sima Qian.

There are also discrepancies of fact such as dates between various portions of the work. This may be a result of Sima Qian's use of different source texts.

== Transmission and supplementation by other writers ==
After ca. 91 BC, the more-or-less completed manuscript was hidden in the residence of the author's daughter, Sima Ying (司馬英), to avoid destruction under Emperor Wu and his immediate successor Emperor Zhao. The Shiji was finally disseminated during the reign of Emperor Xuan by Sima Qian's grandson (through his daughter), Yang Yun (楊惲), after a hiatus of around twenty years.

The changes in the manuscript of the Shiji during this hiatus have always been disputed among scholars. That the text was more or less complete by ca. 91 BC is established in the Letter to Ren An (報任安書), composed in the Zhenghe (征和) era of Emperor Wu's reign. In this letter, Sima Qian describes his work as "spanning from the time of the Yellow Emperor to the present age and consisting of ten tables, twelve basic annals, eight treatises, thirty chapters on hereditary houses, and seventy biographies, together totaling 130 chapters." These numbers are likewise given in the postface to Shiji.

After his death (presumably only a few years later), few people had the opportunity to see the whole work. However, various additions were still made to it. The historian Liu Zhiji reported the names of a total of fifteen scholars supposed to have added material to the Shiji during the period after the death of Sima Qian. Only the additions by Chu Shaosun (褚少孫, c. 105 – c. 30 BC) are clearly indicated by adding "Mr Chu said," (Chu xiansheng yue, 褚先生曰). Already in the first century AD, Ban Biao and Ban Gu claimed that ten chapters in Shiji were lacking. A large number of chapters dealing with the first century of the Han dynasty (i.e. the 2nd century BC) correspond exactly to the relevant chapters from the Book of Han (Hanshu). It is unclear whether those chapters initially came from the Shiji or from the Hanshu. Researchers Yves Hervouet (1921–1999) and A. F. P. Hulsewé argued that the originals of those chapters of the Shiji were lost and they were later reconstructed using the corresponding chapters from the Hanshu.

== Editions ==
The earliest extant copy of the Shiji, handwritten, was made during the Southern and Northern Dynasties period (420–589 AD). The earliest printed edition, called Shiji jijie (史記集解, literally Scribal Records, Collected Annotations), was published during the Northern Song dynasty. Huang Shanfu's edition, printed under the Southern Song dynasty, is the earliest collection of the Sanjia zhu commentaries on the Shiji (三家注, literally: The Combined Annotations of the Three Experts).

In modern times, the Zhonghua Book Company in Beijing has published the book in both simplified Chinese for mass consumption and traditional Chinese for scholarly study. The 1959 (2nd ed., 1982) Sanjiazhu edition in traditional Chinese (based upon the Jinling Publishing House edition, see below) contains commentaries interspersed among the main text and is considered to be an authoritative modern edition.

The most well-known editions of the Shiji (all woodblock printed) are:

Year	Publisher	Notes
Southern Song dynasty (1127–1279)	Huang Shanfu	Abbreviated as the Huang Shanfu edition (黄善夫本)
Ming dynasty, between the times of the Jiajing and Wanli Emperors (between 1521 and 1620)	The Northern and Southern Imperial Academy	Published in 21 Shi. Abbreviated as the Jian edition (监本)
Ming dynasty	Bibliophile Mao Jin (毛晋), 1599–1659) and his studio Ji Gu Ge (汲古閣 or the Drawing from Ancient Times Studio)	Published in 17 Shi. Abbreviated as the Mao Ke edition (毛刻本) or the Ji Gu Ge edition (汲古閣本)
Qing dynasty, in the time of the Qianlong Emperor (1711–1799)	Wu Yingdian	Published in the Twenty-Four Histories (24 Shi), abbreviated as the Wu Yingdian edition (武英殿本)
Qing dynasty, in the time of the Tongzhi Emperor (1856–1875)	Jinling Publishing House (in Nanjing)	Proofreading and copy editing done by Zhang Wenhu. Published with the Sanjiazhu commentaries, 130 volumes in total. Abbreviated as the Jinling Ju or Jinling Publishing edition (金陵局本)

== Notable translations ==
=== English ===
- Herbert J. Allen, Ssŭma Ch'ien's Historical Records, The Journal of the Royal Asiatic Society of Great Britain and Ireland, 1894, p. 269–294; 1895, p. 93–110, 601–611, available online. (The first English translation of the first three chapters).
- Watson, Burton, trans. (1961). Records of the Grand Historian of China. New York: Columbia University Press.
  - Second edition, 1993 (Records of the Grand Historian). Translates roughly 90 out of 130 chapters.
    - Qin Dynasty, ISBN 978-0-231-08169-6.
    - Han Dynasty, Volume 1, ISBN 978-0-231-08165-8.
    - Han Dynasty, Volume 2, ISBN 978-0-231-08167-2.
- Yang Hsien-yi and Gladys Yang (1974), Records of the Historians. Hong Kong: Commercial Press.
  - Reprinted by University Press of the Pacific, 2002. Contains biographies of Confucius and Laozi. ISBN 978-0835106184
- Raymond Stanley Dawson (1994). Historical Records. New York: Oxford University Press.
  - Reprinted, 2007 (The First Emperor : Selections from the Historical Records). Translates only Qin-related material. ISBN 9780199574391
- William H. Nienhauser, Jr., ed. (1994– ). The Grand Scribe's Records, 10 vols. Bloomington: Indiana University Press. Ongoing translation, and being translated out of order. As of 2026, translates 112 out of 130 chapters, with only the Tables and Treatises sections left untranslated.
  - I. The Basic Annals of Pre-Han China (2018), ISBN 978-0-253-03855-5. Basic Annals 1-7.
  - II. The Basic Annals of the Han Dynasty (2018), ISBN 978-0-253-03909-5. Basic Annals 8-12.
  - V. part 1. The Hereditary Houses of Pre-Han China (2006), ISBN 978-0-253-34025-2. Hereditary Houses 1-10.
  - V. part 2. The Hereditary Houses, II (2026), ISBN 978-0-253-07647-2. Hereditary Houses 11-17.
  - VI. The Hereditary Houses, III (2022), ISBN 978-0-253-06418-9. (edited with Masha Kobzeva) Hereditary Houses 18-30.
  - VII. The Memoirs of Pre-Han China (1995, revised 2021), ISBN 978-0-253-34027-6. Biographies 1-28.
  - VIII. The Memoirs of Han China, Part I (2008), ISBN 978-0-253-34028-3. Biographies 29-44.
  - IX. The Memoirs of Han China, Part II (2010), ISBN 978-0-253-35590-4. Biographies 45-52.
  - X. The Memoirs of Han China, Part III (2016), ISBN 978-0-253-01931-8. Biographies 53-61.
  - XI. The Memoirs of Han China, Part IV (2019), ISBN 978-0-253-04610-9. Biographies 62-70.

=== Non-English ===
- (in French) Chavannes, Édouard, trans. (1895–1905). Les Mémoires historiques de Se-ma Ts'ien [The Historical Memoirs of Sima Qian], 6 vols.; rpt. (1967–1969) 7 vols., Paris: Adrien Maisonneuve. Left uncompleted at Chavannes' death. William Nienhauser calls it a "landmark" and "the standard by which all subsequent renditions... must be measured.". Accessible online at Se-ma Ts'ien: Les Mémoires Historiques - Bibliothèque Chine ancienne and La bibliothèque numérique Les Classiques des sciences sociales - Collection «Les auteur(e)s classiques» - La Chine ancienne - Les auteurs chinois.
- (in French) Chavannes, Édouard, Maxime Kaltenmark Jacques Pimpaneau, translators. (2015) Les Mémoires historiques de Se-Ma Ts'ien [The Historical Memoirs of Sima Qian], 9 vols.; Éditions You Feng, Paris. This is the completed full translation of the Shiji
- (in Russian) full translation in 9 vols: Vyatkin, Rudolf V., trans. Istoricheskie Zapiski (Shi-czi) [Исторические записки (Ши-цзи)], 8 vols. Moscow: Nauka (1972–2002); 9th volume: Vyatkin, Anatoly R., trans. (2010), Moscow: Vostochnaya literatura. This is the first complete translation into any European language. Full text available online: Сыма Цянь. Исторические записки (Ши цзи).
- (in Modern Chinese) Yang Zhongxian 杨钟贤; Hao Zhida 郝志达, eds. (1997). Quanjiao quanzhu quanyi quanping Shiji 全校全注全译全评史记 [Shiji: Fully Collated, Annotated, Translated, and Evaluated], 6 vols. Tianjin: Tianjin guji chubanshe.
- (in Modern Chinese) Yang Yanqi 杨燕起; ed. (2001). "Shi Ji Quan Yi" 史记全译, 12 vols. Guiyang: Guizhou renmin chubanshe 贵州人民出版社.
- (in Modern Chinese) Xu Jialu 许嘉璐; An Pingqiu 安平秋, eds. (2003). Ershisishi quanyi: Shiji 二十四史全译：史记, 2 vols. Beijing: Hanyudacidian chubanshe.
- (in Japanese) Mizusawa, Toshitada 水澤利忠; Yoshida, Kenkō 吉田賢抗, trans. (1996–1998). Shiki 史記 [Shiji], 12 vols. Tokyo: Kyūko.
- (in Polish) Mieczysław J. Künstler, trans. (2000). Sy-ma Ts'ien, Syn smoka. Fragmenty Zapisków historyka, Warszawa: Czytelnik; ISBN 83-07-02780-2. Selected chapters only.
- (in Danish) Svane, Gunnar O., trans. (2007). Historiske Optegnelser: Kapitlerne 61-130, Biografier 1-70. Aarhus: Aarhus Universitetsforlag.
- (in German) Gregor Kneussel, Alexander Saechtig, trans. (2016). Aus den Aufzeichnungen des Chronisten, 3 vols. Beijing: Verlag für fremdsprachige Literatur (Foreign Languages Press); ISBN 978-7-119-09676-6.
- (in Italian) Cannata, Vincenzo, translator. (2024) Memorie Storiche di Sima Qian [Historical Memoirs of Sima Qian], 4 vols.; Luni Editrice, Milano This is the completed full translation of the Shiji; ISBN 9-788879-848220.

== See also ==
- Twenty-Four Histories
- Liang Yusheng
