= Nine Changes =

"Nine Changes," also known as "Nine Variations," "Chiu pien" or "Jiu Bian" (traditional Chinese: 九辯; simplified Chinese: 九辩; pinyin: Jiǔ biàn) is one of the 17 poems in the ancient Chinese poetry collection Chu ci, also known as The Songs of the South, or The Verses of Chu. Along with Shi Jing, Chu ci is one of the two essential Classical Chinese anthologies of poetry. The authorship, date, division, title significance, and composition intention of "Nine Changes" are controversial. However, it is still vital in the development process of Chinese poetry. As a poem in Chu ci, "Nine Changes" is written in a new style: "Sao Style," which allows each line to contain a good deal of narrative. Moreover, starting from "Nine Changes," "be grieved by autumn" (悲秋) has been a motif of traditional Chinese literature.

== Authorship ==
Song Yu is a purported author of the "Nine Changes." He was a supposedly 3rd century B.C. disciple of a 4th century B.C. poet called Qu Yuan at the Chu court. A 2nd century A.D. compiler Wang Yi, who collected all poems and compiled this anthology, first attributed the poem to Song Yu. Zhu Xi (12th—13th century, A.D.) also claimed that this poem was composed by Song Yu, who grieved his teacher Qu Yuan's exile and thus wrote this poem to proclaim his integrity.

However, the authorship is still controversial because there is scant reliable information about this purported author. Although a notable historian Sima Qian (c. 2nd—1st century, B.C.), in his Historical Records, listed Song Yu among the great poets of the Chu who lived after Qu Yuan, Sima Qian did not mention the authorship of "Nine Changes." Jiao Hong (16th century—17th century, A.D.) believes that this poem was composed by Qu Yuan rather than Song Yu. The same situation also happens in other poems: "the date and authorship of the poems in the anthology (Chu ci) are in many cases the subject of fierce controversy."

== Content ==
=== Title ===
"Nine Changes" is a title borrowed from myth, and another example of such borrowing is "Nine Songs," a phrase that occurs in more than one Chinese myth. Wang Fuzhi (1619–1692) clarifies that this poem uses the same title of another "Jiu Bian" composed by the son of the founder of the Xia dynasty. Modern scholar Gopal Sukhu agrees that this title "refers to music said to have been brought back to earth by Qi, the son of the founder of the Xia dynasty, after one of his visits to heaven."

The Chinese characters are "九辩" (which pinyin is "Jiǔ Biàn"), in which "九" literally means "Nine," and "辩" literally means "arguments." "Nine" in antiquity was often used as a synonym for "many," and in the context of the Chu ci generally refers to a musical arrangement with "nine" modal changes. According to Wang Yi, "Nine" is the number of "Yang (masculine principle);" "Nine" indicates the Way ("the Way" is the fundamental reality; a constant Way in which the diverse ways of living and relating are essentially balanced) of ordering principles, such as the nine stars of the heaven, and the nine "isles (provinces)" of the earth.

The word "biàn" (辩) has multiple explanations. In ancient China, two different characters sharing the same pronunciation could be interchangeable, while the modern pinyin may reflect the Classical Chinese pronunciation. In other words, "biàn" (辩) could be interchangeable with another or even dozens of Chinese characters with the same pronunciation. The first compiler Wang Yi considers the word "biàn" (辩) to be interchangeable with "biàn (change)" (变). Wang Fuzhi regards "jiǔ biàn" as "jiǔ biàn (nine times)" (九遍), which indicates that the poem is composed of nine parts. Gopal Sukhu claims that "Nine Variations are variations on themes that belong very much to court life: falling out of favor with one’s sovereign and the concomitant demotion and exile." He thus suggests that "biàn" is also interchangeable with "biǎn (demotion)" (贬).

=== Structure ===
"Nine Changes" is a long poem with 258 lines, while two lines usually compose a complete sentence. This poem does not have individual subtitles, subheadings, or clear division. Moreover, rather than consisting of rhymed couplets, lines tend to be characterized by run-on rhyming: thus, the number of individual pieces of the "Nine Changes" is uncertain. Though Wang Fuzhi claims that "Nine Changes" is "Jiǔ biàn (nine times)" and which indicates that the poem is composed of nine parts, the "Nine Changes" verses are not characterized by clear division into separate parts. In fact, different critics have different ways of division: Wang Fuzhi divides the poem into nine parts; Hong Xingzu (c. 1090—1155, in his Chu ci Buzhu) and Zhu Xi (in his Chu ci Jizhu) divide the poem into ten parts; Gopal Sukhu divides it into eleven parts.

=== Poem Style ===
There are two types of poems in Chu ci. One is "Sao-style" poems, and another is "Song-style" poems. The "Song Style" was widely used from the 11th century B.C. to the 6th century B.C., while "Nine Changes" is written in a new poem style: "Sao Style." The most significant "Sao-style" poem in Chu ci is "Li Sao (Encountering Sorrow)," which reputedly was composed by Qu Yuan. Modern scholars believe that Qu Yuan and his "Li Sao" have influenced later "Sao-style" poems in Chu ci, and the poems composed in "Sao Style," such as "Nine Changes," "Yu Fu (The Fisherman)," and "Bu Ju (Divining the Abode)," "aim to capture Qu Yuan's poetic spirit and sentiment of desolation."

According to David Hawkes, "Sao-style poem" is an evolution from the "Song-style poem," and this new style is designed for the recitation of long narrative poems. Hawkes uses the carrier-sound "hsi," the unstressed particle "tee," and the mark of a content character "tum" to demonstrate the sentence structures of "Sao-style poem" and "Song-style poem." The prosodic unit of a Sao-style poem is a double-line sentence separated midway by the carrier-sound "hsi." The differences between the two styles become apparent when Hawkes compares two sentences of a Song-style poem with one double-line sentence of a "Sao-style" poem.

Two Sentences of a "Song-style" Poem:

tum tum tum hsi tum tum.

tum tum tum hsi tum tum.

One Sentence of a "Sao-style" Poem:

tum tum tum tee tum tum hsi,

tum tum tum tee tum tum.

From the structures above, the Sao-style sentence "contains on the average three times as many meaningful syllables as the tetrasyllabic line of the Shih Ching songs ("Song-style" poems in Shi Jing)," and the Sao-style poems "are very long and contain a good deal of narrative." Undoubtedly, in "Sao Style," the longer lines and more meaningful syllables allow poets to describe complicated things.

As a "Sao-style poem," "Nine Changes" follows the "Sao Style" sentence structure. In "Nine Changes," we can also see such a pattern:

"顏 (tum) 淫 (tum) 溢 (tum) 而 (tee) 將 (tum) 罷 (tum) 兮 (hsi)，

柯 (tum) 彷 (tum) 佛 (tum) 而 (tee) 萎 (tum) 黃 (tum)；

萷 (tum) 櫹 (tum) 槮 (tum) 之 (tee) 可 (tum) 哀 (tum) 兮 (hsi)，

形 (tum) 銷 (tum) 鑠 (tum) 而 (tee) 瘀 (tum) 傷 (tum)。"

Like other "Sao-style" poems, "Nine Changes" also contains an abundant narrative of the depiction of nature and emotional expressions, which allows "Nine Changes" to become a notable early example of nature poetry.

=== Nature Poetry ===
"Nine Changes," as a nature poem or a poem about a journey, can be compared with other poems in Chu ci. Similar to "Yuan You" (also known as "Yuan Yu" or "Distant Journey"), which is "a Taoist re-casting of 'Li Sao (Encountering Sorrow),' tracing the path of an adept from worldly frustrations to the attainment of mystical union," "Nine Changes" also contains "a quest journey for a Fair One prompted both by frustrations at court and by grief over the passing of time." Besides that, similar to "Yu Fu (The Fisherman)" and "Bu Ju (Divining the Abode)," "Nine Changes" also "develops a new depiction of nature far beyond the brief and simple images known from the 'Airs of the States (Guo Feng).'" In other words, it describes the bleak environment in a long and intense way of description.

The "Nine Changes" is an interesting early example of nature poetry. Hawkes says that in terms of the development of poetry, the "Nine Changes" shows, "perhaps for the first time, a fully developed sense of what the Japanese call mono no aware, the pathos of natural objects, which was to be the theme of so much Chinese poetry through the ages."

Moreover, "Nine Changes" starts a lyrical tradition that autumn is associated with sadness. "Nine Changes" is filled with descriptions of autumn scenery. Additionally, the speaker of this poem frequently expresses his sorrow in this poem by using "sadness" (悲), "gloomy" (凄), and "lonely" (独) directly. For example, the poet describes the wan and drear autumn in the first four lines: the trees are decaying, the leaves are falling, the air is cold, and the speaker feels sad. Gopal Sukhu relates this poem to "demotion and exile," he claims that this poem depicts the exile’s landscape, which is the wilderness; he notes that the season is autumn, and that sadness that is peculiar to autumn is associated with this work. From "Nine Changes," "be grieved by autumn" becomes a motif of traditional Chinese literature.

== See also ==
- Chu ci
- List of Chuci contents
- Liu An
- Liu Xiang (scholar)
- Mono no aware
- Qu Yuan
- Song Yu
- Wang Yi (librarian)

=== Sources ===
- 九辯 "Nine Changes" (九辯), text source, in Chinese
