= History of fu poetry =

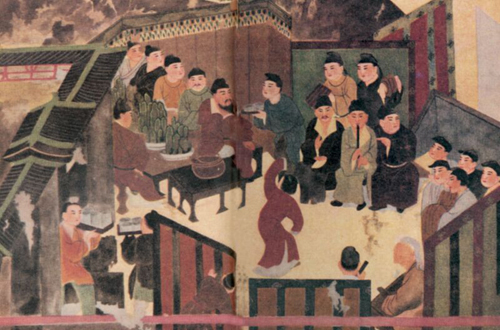
- Han dynasty literary gathering at the court of Liu Wu, King of Liang
- Traditional Chinese: 賦
- Simplified Chinese: 赋
- Hanyu Pinyin: Fù
- Wade–Giles: Fu
- Jyutping: Fu^{3}
- Hokkien POJ: Hu
- Middle Chinese: Pju^{C}

The History of fu poetry covers the beginnings of the Chinese literary genre of fu. The term fu describes literary works that have certain characteristics. English lacks an equivalent term (or form). Sometimes called "rhapsodies", sometimes "rhyme-prose", fu have qualities of both poetry and prose: both are obligatory. The fu form is a poetic treatment, wherein a topic (or topics) of interest, such as an exotic object, a profound feeling, or an encyclopedic subject, is described and rhapsodized upon, in exhaustive detail and from various angles. For a piece to be truly considered to be in the fu genre, it must follow the rules of this form, in terms of structure, meter, and so on.

The first known fu in the fully accepted, modern meaning of the term, dates from the later part of the Zhou dynasty (c. 1046–256 BC), also known as the Warring States period (4th or 5th century BC – 221 BC), since the central regime of the Zhou dynasty had weakened and political power devolved to control by various regional hegemons. During the Han dynasty (206 BC – 220 AD), the fu style developed into one of the Classical Chinese poetry forms. The fu form continued to develop through the Tang dynasty (618–906 AD), where it found an exponent in the poet Li Bai, although he is less known in modern translation for this than for his shi and yuefu poetry. After this, new forms of poetry and literature continued to arise and spread, and the fu form became less prominent. During the Song dynasty (960 – 1278 AD) the ci form became dominant; after Kublai Khan established the Yuan dynasty in the 13th century, qu ruled as the poetry style of the times. More recently, the fu form has been the subject of historical study and critical interest.

== Origins ==
=== Word fu ===
The term "fu", when applied to Chinese literature, first appears in the Zhou dynasty (during the time period also known as the "Warring States"), where it meant "to present", as in poetic recitations. The term "fu", when not applied to Chinese literature, appears earlier than this with the meaning of "tribute", in the sense of a military contribution of goods or services.

=== Ancestry ===
The fu form derives from a long tradition of Chinese poetry and literature. There are also related genres, such as ch'i and chiu.

=== Classic of Poetry ===
The fu form was one of the three literary devices traditionally assigned to the songs of the Classic of Poetry (Shijing). Fu became the name of poetic expositions in which an author or composer created a comprehensive exposition and perform it as a rhapsody. Han dynasty historian Ban Gu in the "Monograph on Arts and Letters" defined fu as "to recite without singing".

==== Verses of Chu ====
O Soul come back to joys beyond all telling!
Where thirty cubits high at harvest time
The corn is stacked;
Where pies are cooked of millet and bearded maize.
Guests watch the steaming bowls
And sniff the pungency of peppered herbs.
The cunning cook adds slices of bird-flesh,
Pigeon and yellow heron and black crane.
They taste the badger-stew.
O Soul come back to feed on foods you love!

Next are brought
Fresh turtle, and sweet chicken cooked with cheese
Pressed by the men of Ch'ü.
And flesh of whelps floating in liver sauce
With salad of minced radishes in brine;
All served with that hot spice of southernwood
The land of Wu supplies.
O Soul come back to choose the meats you love!

Roasted daw, steamed widgeon and grilled quail—On every fowl they fare.
Boiled perch and sparrow broth—in each preserved
The separate flavor that is most its own.
O Soul come back to where such dainties wait!

Selection from the "Great Summons" of the Chu Ci.
Translation Arthur Waley.
While not considered to be a fu itself, ancestral similarities are evident.

Fu poetry is often viewed as a descendant of the Verses of Chu (also known as the Chu Ci or Ch'ü Tz'u) songs combined with the rhetorical expositions of the Intrigues of the Warring States. The Chu Ci is an anthology of Chinese poetry traditionally attributed mainly to Qu Yuan and Song Yu from the Warring States period (ended 221 BC), though about half of the poems seem to have been composed several centuries later, during the Han dynasty. Particularly, literary historians sometimes see an influence upon the fu from the "shaman-inspired catalogues of royal luxury" of the Verses of Cu pieces such as appear in "Zhao Hun" (or the somewhat similar "Da Zhao").

==== First fu ====
The first fu is unknowable, both due to the vicissitudes of historical survival of literature, or failure thereof; but, also, there is the further definitional question of identifying early fu-like pieces as full-on, actual fu, or as archetypical prototypes. There is scholarly debate regarding the origin of the fu, and the identity of the first surviving example.

A chapter of Xunzi contains a series of riddles which Idema and Haft cite theoretically as the earliest known fu, but they also cite the earliest definitively identified fu to be Jia Yi's "Fu on the Owl" (Chinese: 鵩鳥賦; pinyin: Fúniǎo fù), composed about 170 BC.

Hellmut Wilhelm definitively identifies "the oldest fu in existence" to be by Xun Qing (also known as Hsün Ch'ing, Xun Kuang, and Xunzi), the attributed author of the Xunzi, in a chapter of which this fu is contained. Wilhelm remarks that the scholarly identification of this fu as such has been impeded by limiting examination of the piece to the series of riddles, but ignoring the immediately succeeding poems which form the coda (luan) of the fu. Wilhelm points out that the Hanshu (also known as the Book of Han) specifically refers to this as a fu. The Hanshu even specifies what categorical type or genre of fu this is, calling it a "fu of frustration", a genre (or subgenre) which later experienced significant development as the "Fu of the scholar's frustration", a name taken from the Xunzi fu.

Xun Qing ("Xun Zi") flourished ca. 312–230 BC, during the Warring States period, but the flourishing of the fu is identified with the Han dynasty, which was established in 206 BC, and with the hands of authors such as Jia Yi (200 BC – 169 BC) and Sima Xiangru (also known as Ssu-ma Hsiang-ju) (179–127 BC).

== Han dynasty ==
=== Western Han ===
Fu achieved its greatest prominence during the early Han dynasty. On his way into exile, and upon crossing the Xiang River, Jia Yi wrote a fu named "Lament for Qu Yuan". After three years of exile, at sunset, an owl flew into his room: the depressed Jia Yi considered this as an omen of his exile soon reaching a miserable end by means of his impending death, as signaled by this avian harbinger of doom, and he wrote another, subsequently renowned fu, "The Owl". After making these contributions to the Xiaoxiang poetry tradition, Jia Yi nevertheless lived to be recalled to court.

Revolving and rushing, a glistening halo,
front and rear conjoined and connected.
Lofty and lofty, lifted and lifted,
roiling and roiling, raging and raging,
pressing and pressing, climbing and climbing,
a layered fortress of multiplied strength,
doubled and diverse like the lines of troops.
Rumbling and roaring, booming and crashing,
pushing and turning, surging and rolling –
truly, it cannot be withstood!

— Description of a tidal bore,
"Seven Stimuli", Mei Sheng

Emperor Wu of Han ascended the throne in 141 BC, and his long reign is considered the golden age of "grand fu" (Chinese: 大賦; pinyin: dàfù). Emperor Wu summoned famous fu writers to the imperial court in Chang'an, where many of them composed and presented fu to the court. The earliest grand fu of Emperor Wu's reign is "Seven Stimuli" (Chinese: 七發; pinyin: Qī fā), by Mei Sheng (Chinese: 枚乘; d. 140 BC). In "Seven Stimuli", Mei Sheng acts as a Warring States-style traveling orator who tries to cure a Chu prince of an illness caused by overindulgence in sensual pleasures by pushing his senses to their limits with his fu descriptions.

During the golden age of fu in the 2nd century BC, many of the greatest fu composers, such as Sima Xiangru, were from the southwestern area of Shu (modern Sichuan Province). Sima Xiangru is the most famous fu writer in history. A native of Chengdu, he was traditionally said to have been summoned to the imperial court after Emperor Wu happened to personally read his "Fu of Sir Vacuous" (Chinese: 子虛賦; pinyin: Zǐxū fù), though this is almost certainly a story added later. After arriving in the capital around 136 BC, Sima Xiangru expanded his "Fu of Sir Vacuous" into his magnum opus, "Fu on the Excursion Hunt of the Son of Heaven" (Chinese: 天子遊獵賦; pinyin: Tiānzǐ yóuliè fù), generally considered the most famous fu of all. This work, often known as "Fu on the Imperial Park" (Chinese: 上林賦; pinyin: Shànglín fù), after the second half of the poem, is a grand celebration of the Emperor's personal hunting park east of Chang'an, and is famed for its rich number of rare and difficult words and characters.

The grand fu of the Western Han dynasty were read and recited as celebrations of pure poetic delight, and were the first pieces of Chinese literature to fuse unrestrained entertainment and moral admonitions in single works. But after the reign of Emperor Wu, his court culture began to be criticized as having placed undue emphasis on the grandiose language in fu and thereby having missed opportunities to encourage moral restraint. The most prominent critic of "grand fu" was the other great fu writer of the Han dynasty, Yang Xiong. As a youth, Yang admired and imitated Sima Xiangru's fu, but he later came to disapprove of grand fu. Yang believed that the original purpose of fu was to "indirectly admonish" (Chinese: 諷; pinyin: fèng), but that the extended rhetorical arguments and complex vocabulary used in grand fu caused their hearers and readers to marvel at their aesthetic beauty while missing their moral messages. Yang juxtaposed early Han dynasty fu with the fu-like expositions in the Classic of Poetry, saying that while those in the Poetry provided moral standards, the fu of the Han poets "led to excess". While known as one of the fu masters of the Han dynasty, Yang's fu are generally known for their focus on admonishing readers and listeners to uphold moral values.

The august house is resplendent, as if dwelling in Heaven;
from a myriad directions they come, gathering like stars.
The honored and favored fan their fires of lust even hotter;
all guard profit without cease.
When a front coach overturns not far ahead,
the rear teams dash forward, racing to catch up.
They exhaust their multifarious craft on terraces and towers,
while the people dwell in the open, sleep in the wet.
They waste fine grain on birds and beasts,
while those below eat chaff and husks without the kernels.
They grandly bestow liberal generosity on fawning flatterers,
but in impeaching loyal protest, they are swift and sure.

— Criticizing corrupt eunuchs and officials,
"Fu on Recounting a Journey", Cai Yong

=== Eastern Han ===
Two of the most famous fu writers of the Eastern Han period were the great polymaths Zhang Heng and Cai Yong. Among Zhang's large corpus are many fu poems, the first written in the shorter style that became typical of post-Han fu. His earliest known fu is "Fu on the Hot Springs" (Chinese: 溫泉賦; pinyin: Wēnquán fù), which describes the hot springs at Mount Li that famously later became a favorite of Imperial Concubine Yang during the Tang dynasty. "Fu on the Two Metropolises" (Chinese: 二京賦; pinyin: Èr jīng fù) is considered Zhang's masterpiece. Zhang spent ten years gathering material for the fu, which is a response to an earlier fu by Ban Gu that is a poetic comparison between the two capitals of the Han dynasty: Luoyang and Chang'an. Zhang's fu is highly satirical, mocking many aspects of the Western Han period, including Emperor Wu. The piece contains long passages describing life in the two capitals in great detail, including the entertainment areas.

Like Zhang, Cai Yong was a prolific writer in addition to his mathematical, astronomical, and musical interests. In AD 159, Cai was summoned to Chang'an to perform on the Chinese zither for the imperial court, but became ill shortly before arriving and returned to his home. He composed a poetic record of his journey in "Fu on Recounting a Journey" (Chinese: 述行賦; pinyin: Shù xíng fù), his best-known fu. In "Fu on Recounting a Journey", Cai cites examples of treacherous and dishonest rulers and officials from Chinese history, then criticizes the eunuchs of the capital for similar crimes.

A number of fu writers from the late 2nd and early 3rd centuries AD became considered great fu poets, and were noted for their descriptions of the chaos and destruction following the collapse of the Han dynasty. Wang Can, who lived as a refugee in Chu after Dong Zhuo was assassinated in AD 192, wrote a famous fu titled "Fu on Climbing the Tower" (Chinese: 登樓賦; pinyin: Dènglóu fù), in which he describes climbing a tower near Jingzhou and gazing longingly in the direction of his home in Luoyang. Poets often used subjects of descriptive fu poems to symbolize themselves, as in "Fu on the Parrot" (Chinese: 鸚鵡賦; pinyin: Yīngwǔ fù), by Mi Heng, in which Mi uses a caged parrot as a metaphor for a scholar whose talents go unrecognized and whose inability to control his tongue results in his captivity. During the Three Kingdoms period, the court of the warlord Cao Cao and his sons Cao Pi and Cao Zhi became a famous literary salon, and a number of fu poems from their court have survived. Cao Zhi's Fu on the Luo River Goddess (Chinese: 洛神賦; pinyin: Luòshén fù) uses an ancient motif from the Verses of Chu in which the author's unfulfilled erotic desire for a goddess symbolically represents their frustration in being denied a high-ranking position at court or in government.

== Six Dynasties ==
During the Six Dynasties period, fu remained a major part of contemporary poetry, although shi poetry was gradually gaining popularity. Six Dynasties fu are generally much shorter and less extravagant than Han dynasty fu, likely due to a tradition of composing works entirely in parallel couplets that arose during the period. While lyrical fu and "fu on things" had been starkly different forms in the Han dynasty, after the 2nd century AD the distinction mostly disappeared. Although the extravagant fu style of the Han mostly disappeared, "fu on things" continued to be widely written.

=== Western Jin ===
During the Western Jin period, fu writing moved away from the extravagant style of the Han dynasty and toward the style of "fu on things". Rather than use fu to laud the glories of the Emperor or the Chinese empire, fu writers often had mundane subjects. Pan Yue, the most famous writer of the period, wrote "Fu on my Tiny House" (Chinese: 狹室賦; pinyin: Xiá shì fù), which describes his life enduring heat and rainstorms in a small cottage, though he actually lived in a large mansion.

Poet Shu Xi (Chinese: 束皙; AD 263–302), one of the most famous scholars of the Western Jin, wrote five fu that have survived to the present, and seem to be written in a playful style. One of them has become well known in the history of Chinese cuisine: his "Fu on Pasta" (Chinese: 餅賦; pinyin: Bǐng fù) is an encyclopedic description of a wide variety of dough-based foods, including noodles, steamed buns, and dumplings, which had not yet become the traditional Chinese foods they are now.

The two most prolific fu writers of the Western Jin were Fu Xuan and his son Fu Xian (Chinese: 傅咸), who together have 94 fu that survive today. Fu Xuan and his son's fu on things frequently involve the natural environment. Fu Xuan has fu describing many different species of plants, fruits, and birds, of which he was especially fond. Fu Xuan's "Fu on the Running Dog" (Chinese: 走狗賦; pinyin: Zǒu gǒu fù), describes an especially quick racing dog. Fu Xian wrote on topics similar to those of his father, but seems to have been particularly fascinated by insects. His "Fu on Paper" (Chinese: 紙賦; pinyin: Zhǐ fù) is well known as an early description of writing paper, which had only been invented about 150 years earlier.

=== Eastern Jin ===
In AD 317, the Western Jin was conquered by a confederation of Xiongnu and Xianbei (Särbi) states, forcing huge numbers of Han Chinese aristocrats and landowners to flee to southern China. Many of the writings from the Eastern Jin, which only controlled land south of the Yangzi River, recount the chaos following north China's conquest and try to extol the imperial power reestablished at the new Eastern Jin capital, Jiankang (modern Nanjing).

Guo Pu, who was famed for his skills in writing and divination, is considered the foremost writer of the Eastern Jin period. Guo wrote a number of fu while fleeing his hometown of Wenxi (modern Wenxi County, Shanxi Province) in the face of an invading Xiongnu army, some of which describe the large number of destroyed or deserted towns and villages throughout the Chinese heartland. Guo's "Fu on the Yangzi River" (Chinese: 江賦; pinyin: Jiāng fù), written around 317, brought him wide renown. This fu is a Han dynasty-style "grand fu" praising the Yangzi River from its origin in Sichuan (as was then believed) to its mouth at the eastern sea. Like early Han fu, the poem displays Guo's broad knowledge and familiarity with rare, obscure vocabulary and ancient legends. Another of Guo's notable fu is "Fu on Making Sacrifices to Heaven in the Southern Suburbs" (Chinese: 南郊賦; pinyin: Nánjiāo fù), a fu on the traditional ritual sacrifice to Heaven made by the Emperor. When Guo composed the fu, an altar for the sacrifice had not yet been constructed in Jiankang. Emperor Yuan of Jin was impressed by Guo's detailed description of the grand ritual and decided to reinstate it.

The general and poet Lu Ji wrote a number of fu, the best known of which is the Wen fu (Essay on literature), an essay on the nature of poetry and poetic forms.

=== Liu Song ===
The Liu family gained control of the Eastern Jin in 420, changing the dynasty's name to Song. A number of famous fu were composed during the Liu Song period. "Fu on the Weed-covered City" (Chinese: 蕪城賦; pinyin: Wú chéng fù) by Bao Zhao (Chinese: 鮑照; 414–466) is about the city Guangling (modern Yangzhou), which once had been a flourishing metropolis, but in Bao's time lay abandoned after being ruined in a battle. Fu were still part of the poems composed at the imperial court, though five-syllable poems were increasingly becoming the main form of verse. In 441, Yan Yanzhi (Chinese: 顏延之; 385–433) composed a famous fu on a prized piebald horse of the Liu Song emperors, titled "Fu on the Russet-and-white Horse" (Chinese: 赭白馬賦; pinyin: Zhěbái mǎ fù), which is known for its extensive use of equine terminology and folklore.

Xie Lingyun is the best-known poet of the Liu Song period and is generally considered one of the greatest of the entire Six Dynasties period, second only to Tao Yuanming. In contrast Tao, Xie is known for difficult language, dense allusions, and frequent parallelisms. Xie's greatest fu is "Fu on Dwelling in the Mountains" (Chinese: 山居賦; pinyin: Shān jū fù), a Han-style "grand fu" describing Xie's personal estate that borrows its style from Sima Xiangru's "Fu on the Imperial Park". Like classical Han fu, the poem uses many obscure and rare characters, but "Fu on Dwelling in the Mountains" is unique in that Xie included his own annotations, without which the poem would be nearly incomprehensible.

=== Liang ===
During the Liang dynasty, fu continued to be popular, but began to merge with the popular five- and seven-syllable poetry forms, which completely eclipsed fu during the Tang dynasty. Some fu pieces, such as Shen Yue's "Fu on Dwelling in the Suburbs" (Chinese: 郊居賦; pinyin: Jiāo jū fù), an homage to Xie Lingyun's "Fu on Dwelling in the Mountains", followed the traditional forms and subjects of classical fu, but an increasing number did not. "Fu on Lotus-picking" (Chinese: 採蓮賦; pinyin: Cǎi lián fù) by Xiao Gang (later Emperor Jianwen of Liang) is a short, lyrical, and mixes freely with popular lyric poetry, portraying southern China as a romantic land of pleasure and sensuality. Lotus-picking was an activity traditionally associated with peasant women that in the early 5th century became a popular topic in fu and poetry.

== Sui dynasty ==
The second half of the 6th century saw southern China conquered by the northern kingdoms and eventually incorporated into the Sui dynasty in 589. Soon after the south's fall, Emperor Wen of Sui ordered its capital, Jiankang, razed to the ground: all buildings in the city and its walls were completely demolished, and the land turned into fields. Many notable writers were forced back to the north, and much of the writing of the early Sui dynasty is in the form of stories of survival.

The most famous writers of the late Six Dynasties and early Sui periods are Yan Zhitui and Yu Xin. Yan's most well-known fu is "Fu on Contemplating My Life" (Chinese: 觀我生賦; pinyin: Guān wǒ shēng fù), which gives an account of Yan's entire life, itself having spanned four separate dynasties. This fu contains Yan's personal annotations added in between various lines in normal prose, and shows Yan's concern that northerners of his generation, as well as members of future generations, would learn of the chaos that had taken place in the south through his writing.

Yu Xin is generally considered the last great fu poet of Chinese history. Yu, like Yan Zhitui, was born in the south but forced to relocate to northern China after the south's defeat, and spent the rest of his career writing of the loss of the south as a loss of an entire culture and way of life. Yu's most famous piece is "Fu on Lamenting the South" (Chinese: 哀江南賦; pinyin: Āi Jiāngnán fù), in which he describes his life's experiences in the context of the larger context of the destruction of the south and its culture.

== Tang and Song dynasties ==
The fu genre changed rapidly during the Tang dynasty. During the early Tang, a new form of fu called "regulated fu" (Chinese: 律賦; pinyin: lǜfù) supplanted the original form. "Regulated fu" had strict rules of form and expression, and required the use of consistent rhymes throughout each piece. Additionally, rules were created to govern the arrangement of tones in each poem, as the introduction of Buddhist texts written in Sanskrit and Pali had stimulated the Chinese the study of their own language and the identification of the four tones of Middle Chinese. Beginning in the Tang dynasty, these "regulated fu" were required for the composition sections of the imperial examinations. Tang writers added new topics to the traditional subjects of fu, such as purely moral topics or scenes from Chinese antiquity. The "parallel fu" (Chinese: 駢賦; pinyin: piānfù) was another variant of the fu developed in the Tang, and was only used for rhetorical compositions.

In 826, Tang poet Du Mu's poem "Fu on E-pang Palace" (Chinese: 阿房宫賦; pinyin: Ēpáng gōng fù) (Note: Although The Cambridge History of Chinese Literature, vol. 1, p. 350, gives the name of the palace as "Apang", most scholarly dictionaries read the first character 阿 as ē, not ā, in this case.) laid the foundation for a new form of fu called "prose fu" (Chinese: 文賦; pinyin: wénfù), in which prose is freely rhymed. This form of fu became the dominant fu form during the late Tang and the Song dynasty. By the 9th and 10th centuries, traditional fu had become mainly historical pursuits, and were largely read and copied because of their inclusion on the imperial examinations.

== Later ==
Fu continued to be written after the demise of the Song dynasty, but these later fu have generally received less scholarly attention.

== See also ==
- Classical Chinese poetry forms
- Han poetry
- Xiaoxiang poetry
