= Zhulong =

Zhulong may refer to:

- Zhulong, Chuzhou (珠龙镇), town in Nanqiao District, Chuzhou, Anhui
- Zhulong, Longquan (住龙镇), town in Longquan, Zhejiang
- Zhulong (mythology) (燭龍), a mythical being in Chinese mythology)
- Zhúlóng (galaxy), an ultra-massive spiral galaxy discovered by the James Webb Space Telescope
- 472235 Zhulong, a Trans-Neptunian Object named after 燭龍
- Pig dragon (Chinese 猪龍), a type of artifact known from ancient China
