= Canglang Pavilion =

Part of the Classical Gardens of Suzhou, China

The Canglang Pavilion
UNESCO World Heritage Site
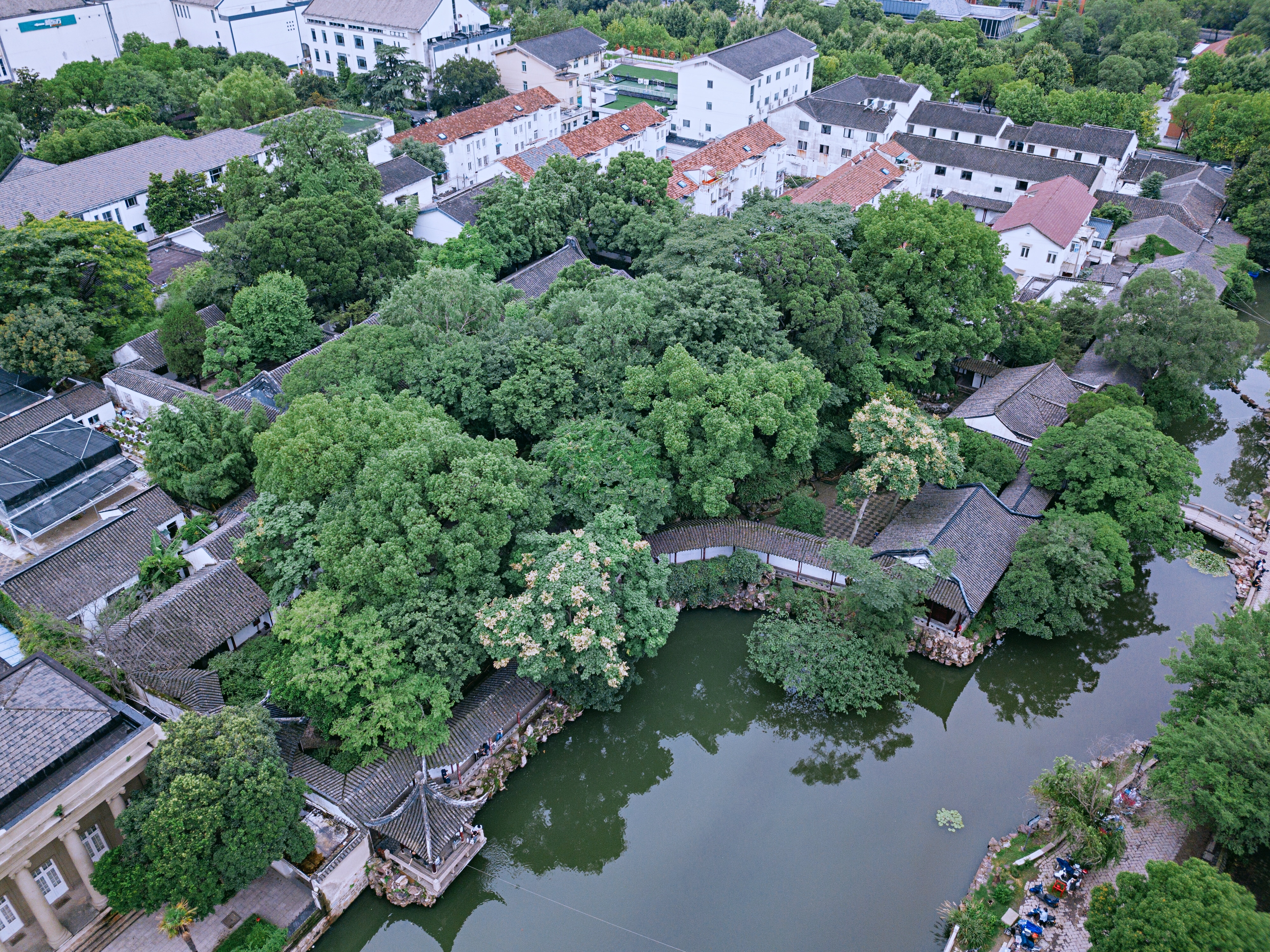
- Aerial view of The Canglang Pavilion.

- Location within Jiangsu Location within China
- Location: Suzhou, Jiangsu, China
- Part of: Classical Gardens of Suzhou
- Criteria: Cultural: (i)(ii)(iii)(iv)(v)
- Reference: 813bis-005
- Inscription: 1997 (21st Session)
- Extensions: 2000
- Area: 1.174 ha (2.90 acres)
- Buffer zone: 16.362 ha (40.43 acres)
- Coordinates: 31°17′49.3″N 120°37′16.1″E

The Canglang Pavilion (traditional Chinese: 滄浪亭; simplified Chinese: 沧浪亭; pinyin: Cāng Làng Tíng; Suzhou Wu, Wugniu: Tshaon^{1} laon^{6} din^{2}, Wu Chinese pronunciation: [tsʰɑ̃ lɑ̃ din]), variously translated as the Great Wave Pavilion, Surging Wave Pavilion, or Blue Wave Pavilion, is one of the Classical Gardens of Suzhou that are jointly recognized as a UNESCO World Heritage Site. It is located at 3 Canglangting Street in Suzhou, Jiangsu China.

== History ==
The Canglang Pavilion was built in 1044 CE by the Song dynasty poet Su Shunqin (1008–1048), on the site of a pre-existing imperial flower garden c 960 CE. It is the oldest of the UNESCO gardens in Suzhou, keeping its original Song dynasty layout. The name is derived from a verse in the poem Fishermen by Qu Yuan (ca. 340 BCE-278 BCE), a poet from the southern state of Chu during the Warring States period, in his book Songs of the South, "If the Canglang River is dirty I wash my muddy feet; If the Canglang River is clean I wash my ribbon". This verse alludes to an honest official who removes himself from politics rather than act in a corrupt manner. Su Shunqing choose this to express his feelings after his removal from office.

After his death the garden passed through many owners and fell into disuse until 1696 CE when it was restored by Song Luo, the governor of Jiangsu Province. In 1827 ownership was transferred to governor Tao Zhu and again in 1873 ownership was transferred to governor Zhang Shusheng. In 1955 the garden was opened to the public and in 2000 it was added to the UNESCO World Cultural Heritage Monuments.

== Design ==
The 1.6 ha garden is divided into two main sections. The garden is sited on a branch of the Fengxi Stream which forms a lotus pond. The garden has 108 windows each one with a unique design.

Garden Design Elements with Description
Elegant Bamboo House Named after a line by Su Shunqing, "Autumn darkens the reddish woods, the sunlight goes through he bamboo elegantly". This irregular building was used as a painting studio.
Enlightenment Hall Named after a line by Su Shunqin, "He Who turns a blind eye and a deaf ear to what is evil will be enlightened" from A Record of the Great Wave Pavilion. This three bay building was the primary hall of the garden used as a lecture hall. It is attached to an enclosed courtyard with covered corridor on three sides. The side opposite this Hall is anchored by the Realm of Yaohua.
Entry Hall
Fish Watching Place Named after a famous dialectic conversation between Zhuangzi about fish which. It is a square detached pavilion with a hipped gable roofline and flying eves. It is unique for being located outside the garden walls. It is connected to the garden by a double roofed corridor which runs above a rockery abstractly depicting the 500 arhats.
Great Wave Pavilion Named after the a line from songs of the south. It is the namesake of the garden. It was moved from its original location of the Fengxi Stream by Song Luo when he rebuilt the garden. It has a unique all stone construction, and uses flower brackets. It is square with a hipped gable roofline and flying eves, as well as a raised ridge. The ridge, gables, and eves are all richly decorated. A pillar couplet has been formed by one verse from Ouyang Xiu's The Canglang Pavilion, and Su Shunqin's (苏舜钦) Passing by Suzhou (过苏州), "The refreshing breeze and the bright moon are priceless; And water nearby and hills afar how beautifully they rate". This composite couplet was composed by governor Liang Zhangju, in honor of the garden.
Imperial Stele Pavilion An attached pavilion at the western end of the main hill housing a stele inscribed with poems by the Kangxi Emperor.
Mountain-in-View Tower The name is meant to evoke the feeling of the view of looking from a high mountain. It is a boat building on top of a grotto with a cave called the Mutual Affinity Stone Chamber.
Pavilion Fronting the Water Named after a line by Du Fu, "All the pavilions front the water and old trees are weather beaten".
Prunus mume Pavilion
Pure Fragrance House Named from a line by Li Shangyin, "Keep Cassia (Osmanthus fragrans) under lock and key not letting its pure fragrance escape". The line was inspired by the 170-year-old Cassia trees in front of this five bay hall.
Realm of Yaohua Named after a line from Historical Record of Suzhou by Lu Xiong, which referred to the mythical Yaohua flower. This flower was said to exist in the Chinese Garden of Eden, and had the quality of sweet smelling and jade like. The name alludes to the noble character of the owner, and was meant to visually evoke something from a fariyland.
Recitation Pavilion An attached pavilion at the eastern end of the main hill. It houses a stele inscribed with the poetry of the Qianlong Emperor.
Reverence Pavilion An attached square pavilion with a stele portrait of Wen Zhenming.
Smelling Prunus mume Pavilion Named after a line by Du Fu, "By lamplight I couldn't sleep as the wonderful smell of Prunus mume purified my mind". Coordinated with the verse is a grove of Prunus mume in front of the hall.
Temple of 500 Sages Built by governor Tao Shu in 1827 to house his collection of 584 engravings of famous sages from Suzhou from the Spring and Autumn period until the Qing dynasty
Water Pavilion of Lotus Blossoms

== See also ==
- Chinese garden
