= Heavenly Questions =

Ancient Chinese poem rich in mythological references

- Simplified Chinese: 天问
- Traditional Chinese: 天問
Transcriptions
Standard Mandarin
- Hanyu Pinyin: Tiān Wèn
- Yale Romanization: Tyān Wèn

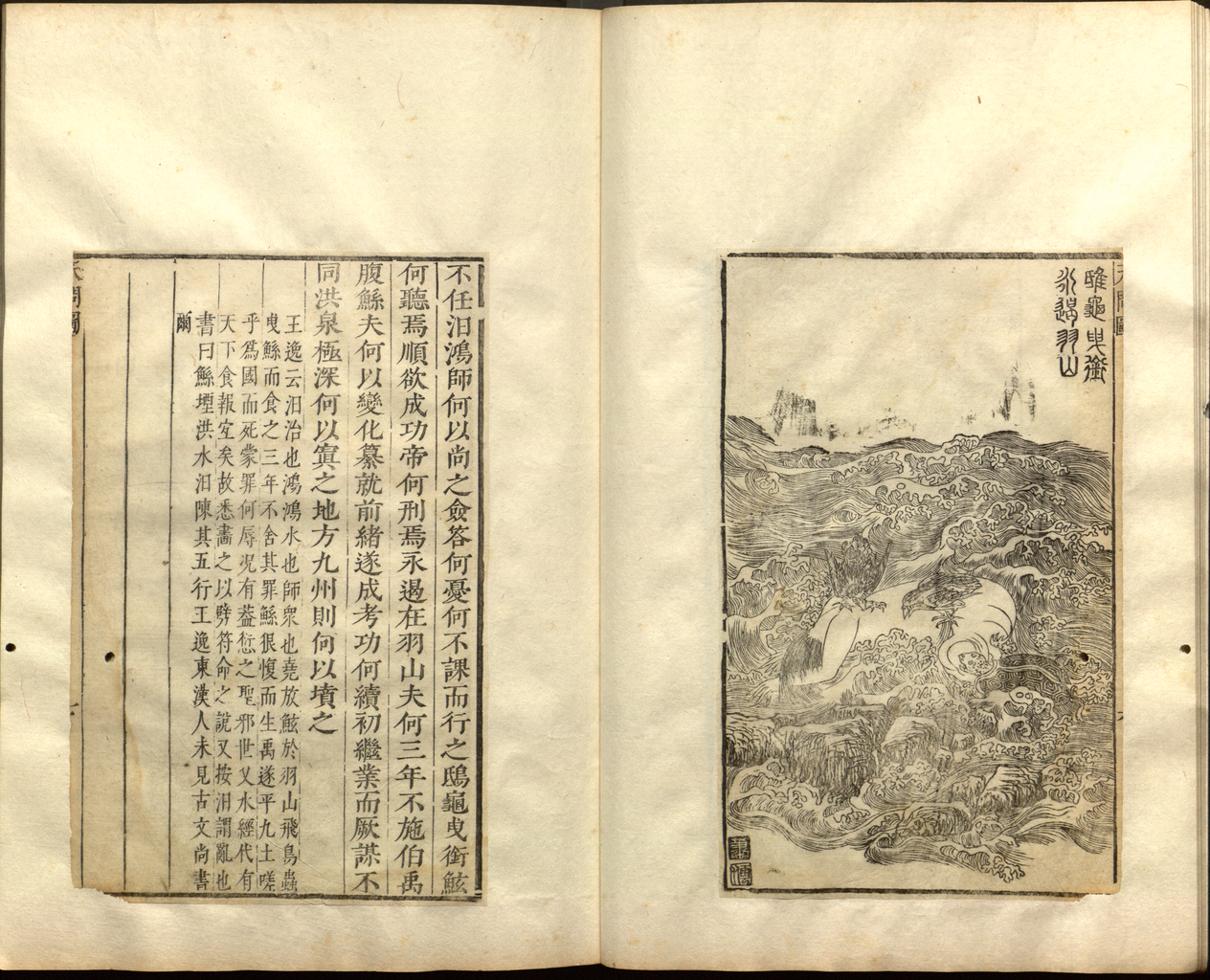
Heavenly Questions (Tian Wen), attributed to Qu Yuan, but with evidence of an older source or sources. From the book The Illustrated Li Sao, illustrated by Xiao Yuncong, and inscribed by Tang Yongxian. Note that the title in the upper right is somewhat cut off due to some reason related to the historical preservation of the original before it was pasted down on a new sheet of paper.

The Heavenly Questions or Questions to Heaven (traditional Chinese: 天問; simplified Chinese: 天问; pinyin: Tiānwèn) is a piece contained in the Classical Chinese poetry collection of Chu Ci, which is noted both in terms of poetry and as a source for information on the ancient culture of China, especially the area of the ancient state of Chu. Of all the poems attributed to Qu Yuan, "Tianwen" contains more myths than any of the other pieces which may be attributed to him; however, due to the formal structure of "Tianwen" as a series of questions, information regarding the myths alluded to appear more as a series of allusive fragments than as cohesively narrated stories.

According to legend, Qu Yuan wrote this series of questions in verse after viewing various scenes depicted on temple murals; specifically, it is said that following his exile from the royal court of Chu, Qu Yuan looked upon the depictions of the ancestors and the gods painted upon the walls of the ancestral temple of Chu; and, then, in response, wrote his questions to Heaven, upon these same walls.

== Description ==
The Heavenly Questions consists of a series of verses, in question format, addressed to Tian, or Heaven. The 172 questions asked revolve around Chinese mythology and ancient Chinese religious beliefs, and perceived contradictions or conundrums existing therein. That the Tianwen consists in questions rather than answers is somewhat of a problem for mythographers. Nevertheless, the questions themselves open up informative windows into a world of ancient mythology. The informational questions raised by Tianwen are a factor that contributes to the description of Tianwen as "the written treasure of Chinese mythology", or as "the most valuable document in Chinese mythology" (Birrell 1993, 26).

== Style ==
The poetic style of the Heavenly Question is markedly different from the other sections of the Chuci collection, with the exception of the "Nine Songs" ("Jiuge"). The poetic form of the Heavenly Questions is the four-character line, more similar to the Shijing than to the predominantly variable lines generally typical of the Chuci pieces, the vocabulary also differs from most of the rest of the Chuci, sharing more in common with works in the wisdom tradition like the Daodejing. David Hinton finds that these features of the work suggest that Heavenly Questions has ancient sources in the oral tradition, although perhaps having been put together into its present form by Qu Yuan. Hinton finds that much of the power of the poetic impact of the Heavenly Questions derives from "its fragmentary and enigmatic character" combined with a pervasive sense of mystery throughout the poem.

== Content ==
The content of the Tianwen includes questions regarding various myths, which today are often important informational sources on the historical development of these myths, with the Tianwen representing some of the earliest textual bases of information regarding these myths.

== Influence ==
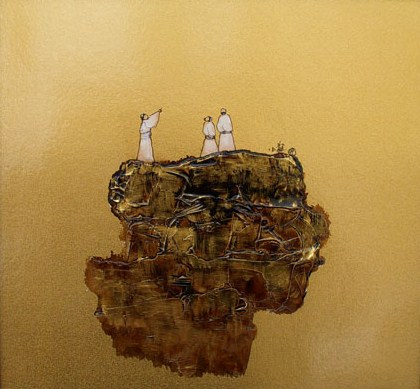
"Question to heaven" from Wang Xiaolong's 2007 series: Tao's Queries.

The Heavenly Questions was an influence on the later works of the Chuci. David Hinton sees the Heavenly Questions and the "Nine Songs" as introducing a "shamanistic world from the folk tradition" into the literary tradition of Chinese poetry: appearing in form close to the older, oral tradition in Heavenly Questions and the "Nine Songs", these voices from the shamanic world were transformed into poetry of "self-conscious individual authorship" with a personal voice in the "Li Sao".

Other examples of the influence of the Heavenly Questions include the poem written by Li He, which A. C. Graham translates as "Don't Go Out of the Door", which then in turn influenced the lyrics of the Pink Floyd song "Set the Controls for the Heart of the Sun", attributed to Roger Waters. This translation by Graham features the line: "Witness the man who raved at the wall as he wrote his questions to Heaven". Thus, beginning with the Heavenly Questions contained in the Chu Ci anthology of the third or fourth century BCE, then progressing to the eighth or ninth century work of Li He influenced by Qu Yuan's Heavenly Questions, and continuing on into the twentieth century with Graham's translation, and through the subsequent use of this motif by Roger Waters in the lyrics for a song by the popular music band Pink Floyd, and then subsequently as cover versions of that song in the twenty-first century, Heavenly Questions has had a long and enduring influence upon poetry and song.

American poet Gjertrud Schnackenberg used the title Heavenly Questions for her elegy of six linked poems on the death of her husband Robert Nozick in 2002. The work won the Griffin Poetry Prize in 2011. The title was taken from the Chinese poem.

China's interplanetary exploration program is named after Heavenly Questions (Tianwen). The first mission, Tianwen-1, was launched on July 23, 2020, and reached Mars on February 10, 2021. On Mar 14, 2021, the lander and rover successfully landed on the surface of Mars.

== See also ==
- Bashe
- Chu ci
- List of Chuci contents
- Liu An
- Liu Xiang (scholar)
- Qu Yuan
- Song Yu
- Tian
- Tianwen-1
- Wang Yi (librarian)
- Wu (shaman)
- Yinglong
- Zhulong (mythology)
