= Singing in the wind =

Singing in the Wind may refer to:

- The sounds produced by overhead power line wires due to wind vortex shedding
- Singing in the Wind, a poem by Robert E. Howard
- Singing in the Wind, a collection of poetry by Yu Fu
