= Guwen Guanzhi =

- Traditional Chinese: 古文觀止
- Simplified Chinese: 古文观止
- Literal meaning: ancient style best-of
Transcriptions
Standard Mandarin
- Hanyu Pinyin: Gǔwén guānzhǐ
- Wade–Giles: Ku-wen kuan-chih
Yue: Cantonese
- Yale Romanization: Gú-màhn gūn-jí
- Jyutping: Gu2-man4 gun1-zi2
Southern Min
- Hokkien POJ: Kó͘-bûn koan-chí

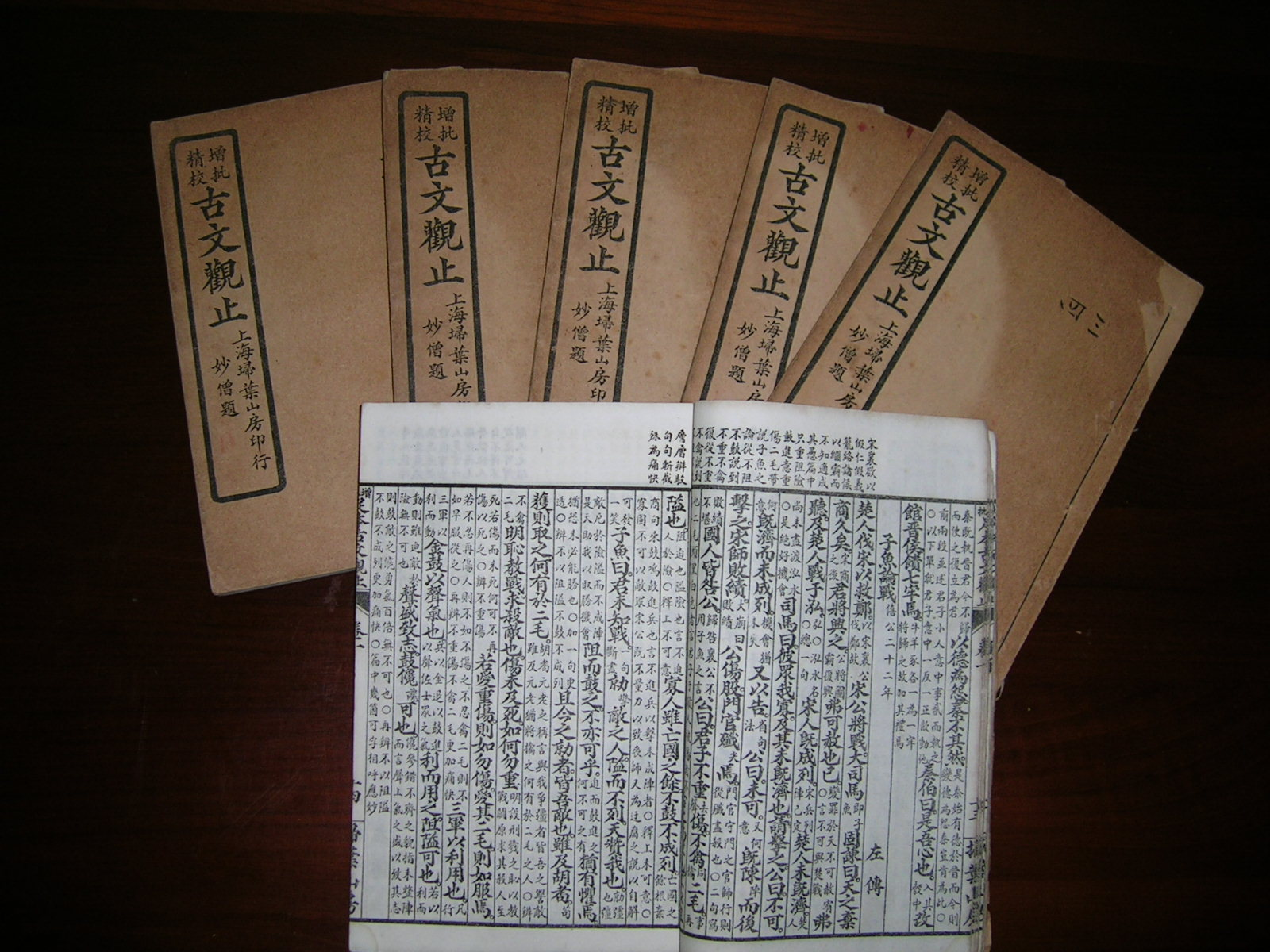
Guwen Guanzhi

Guwen Guanzhi (Chinese: 古文觀止) is an anthology of essays written in literary Chinese. It was first published during the Qing dynasty in 1695. It comprises more than two hundred works from the Warring States period to the Ming dynasty. Today the anthology (in whole but mostly in part) is widely used as required or supplementary reading material of literary Chinese in schools in the Greater China Region, including the Mainland China, Hong Kong, Macao and Taiwan.

== Structure ==
Guwen Guanzhi has a total of 221 texts. The texts are arranged by period, and originally the book consisted of 12 fascicles (juan, 卷). The composition is as follows:

- Zhou dynasty (1045–221 BC), fascicles 1–3, 56 texts; from Zuo Zhuan 34 texts, Guoyu 11, Gongyang Zhuan 3, Guliang Zhuan 2, Liji: ”Tangong” 6
- Qin dynasty (221–206 BC), fascicle 4, 17 texts; from Zhan Guo Ce 14 texts, by Li Si one text, two Chu ci poems
- Han dynasty (206 BC–220), fascicles 5–6, 31 texts; from Shiji and by Sima Qian 15 texts; also texts from Hanshu, Hou Hanshu, Xinshu and by various writers including Zhuge Liang
- Six dynasties (222–589), fascicle 7, 6 texts by one writer from Western Jin/Shu, two from Eastern Jin and one from Southern Qi
- Tang dynasty (618–907), fascicles 7–9, 43 texts by 9 writers
- Song dynasty (960–1279), fascicles 9–11, 51 texts by 12 writers (all from Northern Song)
- Ming dynasty (1368–1644), fascicle 12, 18 texts by 12 writers

Most of the texts are prose written in the "ancient style" which guwen (古文) refers to. The selection includes also three (or four) pieces written in ”parallel prose” (usually not regarded as guwen), as well as three ci and four fu prose poems. Guanzhi (literally "read-end") is an idiom meaning "good beyond comparison; cream of the crop."

Guwen Guanzhi was first and foremost produced as a practical study aid. The compilers avoided overly difficult texts and made their explanations as clear and concise as possible. In its own time, Guwen Guanzhi's main assets were its ideal size (in terms of number and length of the selected texts), the relative comprehensiveness of its selection, lack of an overly moralistic or tendentious approach, and good notes and comments. The same features have helped the anthology survive through centuries.

== Origin ==
Guwen Guanzhi was compiled and edited by Wu Chucai and Wu Diaohou, who at the time of the publication were working as teachers in a private village school in Shaoxing. Very little is known of Wu Chucai (given name Wu Chengquan 吳乘權, sobriquet Chucai, 楚才, 1655–1719), except that he was originally from Shaoxing and never became part of the established literati. Wu Diaohou (given name Wu Dazhi 吳大職, courtesy name Diaohou, 調侯) was his younger nephew.

Wu Chucai started working on the anthology in 1678 in Fujian where he had travelled to take on duties as a private secretary for his uncle, high imperial official Wu Xingzuo (吳興祚, 1632–97). His nephew joined him in the work later.

The anthology was originally published in two editions. The first edition of the 34th year of the Kangxi Emperor's reign (1695, place of printing unknown) has the preface by Wu Xingzuo, which in the second edition of 1697 has been replaced by the preface of Wu Chucai and Wu Diaohou. The 1697 edition also contained some corrections and changes on the notes and commentaries, but was otherwise of lower quality than the first edition. Only the first edition has been the basis for all following editions (through two Qianlong era editions).

Analysis shows that the composition of Guwen Guanzhi is heavily based on a former anthology produced by an altogether different compiler. Though the "blueprint" has often been presumed to be the "imperial" anthology Guwen yuanjian (古文淵鑑), edited during early Qing dynasty under the personal supervision of the Kangxi Emperor, and including the standard commentaries required for the imperial examinations, this has proven not to be the case. Instead, altogether almost 90% of the texts in Guwen Guanzhi originate from another Qing era anthology, Guwen xiyi (古文析義), often copied character by character. However, the notes and commentaries are all different.

Guwen xiyi was compiled and edited by Lin Yunming (林雲銘, 1628–97, Fujian). Lin Yunming was a mid-ranking official who had passed the metropolitan examination (jinshi) in 1658. An earlier version of Lin's manuscript "is said to have been lost in the course of the 'Fujian troubles' ...", referring to the Revolt of the Three Feudatories. In 1674, Lin was imprisoned by the pro-Ming rebels, who in turn were defeated by the troops under the command of Wu Xingzuo and others in 1675. Guwen xiyi was published in 1682.
