= Zhao Hun =

"Zhao Hun" ("Summons of the Soul")
- Chinese seal script character for wu, or "shaman"
- Chinese: 招魂
- Literal meaning: "Summoning the (hun) soul"
- Hanyu Pinyin: Zhāo Hún

Summons of the Soul, Summoning of the Soul, or Zhao Hun (Chinese: 招魂, or, with old variant 招䰟; Pinyin: Zhāo Hún) is one of the poems anthologized in the ancient Chinese poetry collection, the Chu Ci. The "Summons of the Soul" consists of a four-part poem. The first part consists of a few lines with no clear relationship to the rest of the poem. The second part is a prolog in the form of a conversation in heaven, in which God (帝) orders the Ancestor Shaman Wu Yang (巫陽) to go down below to earth and help out in the case of someone whose soul has wandered off. Part three is the actual summoning of the soul, by means of threats and temptations. The fourth part is an epilog (luan). (Hawkes, 2011 [1985]: 222) The authorship of "Summons of the Soul" has been attributed to Qu Yuan, but Song Yu is more likely. (Hawkes, 2011 [1985]: 223) The "Summons of the Soul" is very similar, but longer, than another of the Chu ci poems, "The Great Summons" (Da zhao). Both poems derive from a shamanic tradition of summoning the soul of someone who has seemed to die, most likely originally with the intention of having it to re-animate its former body (but in the later literary tradition this was meant more allegorically). The two poems both follow a similar pattern: threats of dangers lurking in all directions to which the soul might wander and then detailed lists with tempting descriptions of magnificent sensual pleasures which would be available as a reward for the souls obedient return (Hawkes, 2011 [1985]: 219–221)

== Interpretations ==
Various interpretations of the "Summoning the Soul" have been made, as to whose soul is being summoned, by whom, and in what context.

== See also ==
- Chuci
- Classical Chinese poetry
- Duanwu Festival
- History of fu poetry
- List of wu shaman
- Qu Yuan
- Wu (shaman)
