= Zhulong (mythology) =

Chinese mythological dragon

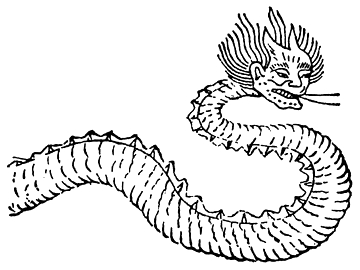
- Zhulong in an edition of the Classic of Mountains and Seas
- Traditional Chinese: 燭龍
- Simplified Chinese: 烛龙
- Literal meaning: Torch Dragon
Transcriptions
Standard Mandarin
- Hanyu Pinyin: Zhúlóng
- Wade–Giles: Chu-lung

Choulong
- Traditional Chinese: 逴龍
- Simplified Chinese: 逴龙
- Literal meaning: Distant Dragon; Quarrelsome Dragon
Transcriptions
Standard Mandarin
- Hanyu Pinyin: Chuòlóng
- Wade–Giles: Ch‘o-lung

Zhoulong
- Traditional Chinese: 趠龍
- Simplified Chinese: 趠龙
- Literal meaning: Outstanding Dragon; Departed Dragon
Transcriptions
Standard Mandarin
- Hanyu Pinyin: Zhuólóng
- Wade–Giles: Cho-lung

Zhuyin
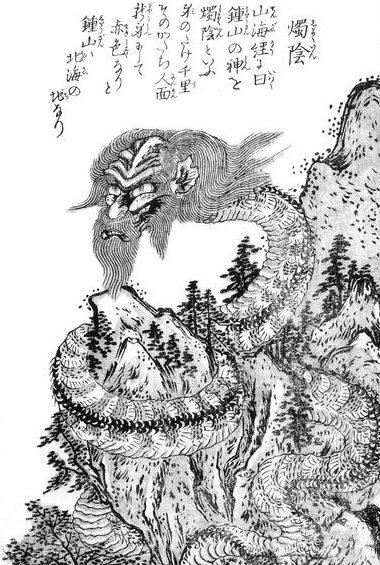
- Zhulong in an edition of the Konjaku Hyakki Shūi
- Traditional Chinese: 燭陰
- Simplified Chinese: 烛阴
- Literal meaning: Light-&-Dark; Illuminator of the Darkness
Transcriptions
Standard Mandarin
- Hanyu Pinyin: Zhúyīn
- Wade–Giles: Chu-yin

Zhulong /ˈdʒuːlɒŋ/ or Zhuyin /ˈdʒuːjɪn/, also known in English as the Torch Dragon, was a giant red solar dragon and god in Chinese mythology. It supposedly had a human's face and snake's body, created day and night by opening and closing its eyes, and created seasonal winds by breathing.

== Names ==
The key word in the names "Zhuyin" and "Zhulong" is 燭, pronounced zhú in present-day Mandarin. It describes the act of "shining" or "illuminating" something but, owing to the nature of Chinese grammar, can function as a verb ("to shine", "to illuminate"), an adjective ("shining", "bright"), or a noun ("light", "illumination", an object which illuminates) depending upon its position in a phrase. For example, the Chinese word for "candle" is 蠟燭 (làzhú) or "wax-zhú"; an older word for "lantern" is 燭籠 (zhúlóng) or "zhú-basket". In the name Zhulong, the zhú modifies the noun 龍 (lóng) and thus intends a "shining", "torch-like", or "torch-bearing" Chinese dragon. and others call him "Torch Dragon", since he is described in some of the classic texts as carrying a torch. In the name Zhuyin, the zhú sits beside the noun 陰 (yīn), which describes both regular darkness and the feminine principle of the yin-yang, with an implicit conjunction between them. The zhú can also be rendered as an attributive, as in Birrell's "Torch Shade", or as an agent, as Visser's "Enlightener of the Darkness".

In the Chu Ci, Zhulong is also rendered as Chuolong, which can variously mean "Distant" or "Quarrelsome Dragon", and as Zhuolong, variously "Outstanding" or "Departed Dragon". According to present reconstructions, these variant characters 逴 (now chuò) and 趠 (now zhuó) sounded closer to the pronunciation of 燭 in old Chinese, although not homophonous.

== Early textual references ==
The names "Zhuyin" and "Zhulong" appear in classic Chinese texts from the Han (3rd century BCE – 3rd century CE) that record the myths of the Zhou (12th–3rd century BCE).

=== Classic of Mountains and Seas ===
The Classic of Mountains and Seas (c. 3rd century BCE – 1st century CE) records parallel myths about Zhuyin and Zhulong.

"The Classic of Regions Beyond the Seas: The North" section (8) describes Zhuyin on Bell Mountain 鍾山, Zhōngshān):

The deity of Mount Bell is named Torch Shade. When this deity's eyes look out there is daylight, and when he shuts his eyes there is night. When he blows it is winter, and when he calls out it is summer. He neither drinks, nor eats, nor breathes. If this god does breathe, there are gales. His body is a thousand leagues long. Torch Shade is east of the country of Nolegcalf, which "lies East of Longtigh country". Nolegcalf "people have no calves on their legs". He has a human face and a snake's body, and he is scarlet in colour. The god lives on the lower slopes of Mount Bell.

Guo Pu (276–324 CE)'s commentary on this passage is:

'Enlightener' is a dragon; he enlightens the nine yin (darknesses, i.e. the nine points of the compass at the opposite, dark side of the earth, which is a flat disk; these nine points are North, South, East, West, North-east, North-west, South-east, South-west, and the Centre)".

"The Classic of the Great Wilderness: The North" section (17) describes Zhulong living on Mount Brillianttail (章尾山, Zhāngwěishān):

Beyond the northwest seas, north of the River Scarlet there is Mount Brillianttail. There is a god-human here with a human face and a snake's body, and he is scarlet. He has vertical eyes that are in a straight seam. When this deity closes his eyes, there is darkness. When the deity looks with his eyes, there is light. He neither eats, nor sleeps, nor breathes. The wind and the rain are at his beck and call. This deity shines his torch over the ninefold darkness. This deity is Torch Dragon.

Guo Pu quotes a legend from a no longer extant Classic of Poetry commentary that "the sky is insufficient to cover the northwest, so there is no ebb and flow of yang and yin. Therefore a dragon carries a torch in its mouth to light up the sky."

=== Songs of Chu ===
The Songs of Chu (3rd–2nd centuries BCE) mentions Zhulong, though not Zhuyin.

The "Heavenly Questions" section (3, cf. Bashe) asks about Zhulong in a line variously translated:

- "What land does the sun not shine on and how does the Torch Dragon light it?"
- "Where does the sun not rise, How does the Torch Dragon flame?"
- "The Torch Dragon flares where the sun does not reach [where? how?]"

The "Great Summons" section (10) uses the alternate name Chuolong or Zhuolong, although Hawkes translates it according to its usual form: "In the north are the Frozen Mountain, and the Torch Dragon, glaring red."

=== Huainanzi ===
The Huainanzi (2nd century BCE) has a section called the "Treatise on Topography" (4) that refers to Zhulong:

The Torch Dragon dwells north of Wild Goose Gate. He hides himself in Abandoned Wings Mountain and never sees the sun. This god has a human face and a dragon body, but no feet.

Gao You (fl. 200 CE) composed a commentary on the Huainanzi that explains "Weiyu is the name of a mountain ... in the shade of the northern limit, the sun cannot be seen." Mount Weiyu (委羽), notes Major, might mean "abandoned wings", "broken wings", "shed feathers", or something else.

=== Records of Penetration into the Mysteries ===
The Records of Penetration into the Mysteries (洞冥記, Dòngmíngjì) describes ritual activities of Emperor Wu of Han (r. 141–87 BCE). It is traditionally attributed to Guo Xian (郭憲, fl. 25–57 CE) but probably dates from around the 6th century. Although this text does not mention Zhuyin or Zhulong by name, Wu's Taoist advisor Dongfang Shuo describes a mythical northern "Azure Dragon" which bears a torch:

... in the year 99 before our era the emperor Wu convoked a meeting of magicians and learned men, at which Tung Fang-soh spoke as follows: "I made a journey to the north pole, and came to a mountain planted with fire, which neither the sun, nor the moon ever illumines, but which is lighted to its uttermost bounds by a blue dragon by means of a torch which it holds in its jaws. I found in that mountain gardens, fields, and parks with ponds, all studded with strange trees and curious plants, and with shrubs which had luminiferous stalks, seeming at night to be lamps of gold. These stalks could be broken off and used as torches, in the light of which the spectres were visible. Ning-fung the immortal had always eaten this plant, the consequence being that in the darkness of the night there beamed light out of his belly. It is called the herb which pierces darkness.

This namesake torch-like plant is called the "herb of penetration into the mysteries" (洞冥草, dòngmíngcǎo).

== Interpretations ==
Zhulong or Zhuyin was not the only serpent-bodied celestial deity in Chinese folklore. Other examples include Pangu, Fuxi, Nüwa and Gonggong. Major describes the Torch Dragon as "well-known in early Chinese mythology" and suggests it is probably "a mythical interpretation of the aurora borealis". Others consider it to embody sunlight. Carr cites a Chinese-language article by Kwang-chih Chang characterizing it with the Eastern Zhou "Transformation Thesis" that natural elements transform out of the bodily parts of mythical creatures.

== Namesakes ==
472235 Zhulong, a resonant trans-Neptunian object discovered by the Pan-STARRS survey in 2014, was named after the mythological creature. The official naming citation was published by the Minor Planet Center on 27 August 2019 (M.P.C. 115895).

Zhúlóng, discovered in late 2024, is the most distant grand design spiral galaxy known.
