= Bu Ju =

Bu Ju (Chinese: 卜居; pinyin: Bǔ Jū; English: Divination) is a short work anthologized in the Chu Ci (楚辭 Songs of Chu, sometimes called The Songs of the South). Although traditionally attributed to Qu Yuan, there is little likelihood that he is the author. (Hawks 2011 [1985]: 203) Rather, "Bu ju" is a biographical or pseudobiographical account of an incident in Qu Yuan's life, mostly in prose, but with a short, incidental verse ascribed to be a quote from Qu Yuan. The anecdotal story tells of how Qu Yuan visited a Great Diviner to resolve some of his moral dilemmas, by means of plastromancy or by casting yarrow stalks. However, in the end the diviner excuses himself on the grounds that in a case such as this one, divination would be of no help.

== See also ==
- I Ching
