= Yuan You =

"Yuanyou" or Far-off Journey (Chinese: 遠遊; pinyin: Yuǎnyóu; English: Far Roaming) is a short work anthologized in the Chuci (楚辭 Songs of Chu, sometimes called The Songs of the South). "Yuanyou" is a poetic conceit involving a shamanic/Daoist flight to various places on earth and in heaven. Traditionally attributed to Qu Yuan, there is little likelihood that he is the actual author, and the imagery of the cosmos and of the beings and deities encountered during this vast trip are rather typical of the literary circle around the Han dynasty Prince of Huainan Liu An, according to David Hawkes. (2011 [1985]: 191 – 193)

== See also ==
- Chuci (the anthology containing "Yuanyou")
- Classical Chinese poetry (general information on subject)
- Daoism (a religiophilosophical tradition strongly referenced in "Yuanyou")
- Eight Immortals of Huainan (members of Liu An's court; also known as the Eight Gentlemen of Huainan)
- Fu Yue (menial worker promoted to key government minister; "Yuanyou" example of proper recognition of merit by the ruler)
- Huainan (a geographic region)
- Huainanzi (a classic text written in the milieu of Liu An's court)
- List of Chuci contents (list of works in the anthology containing "Yuanyou")
- Liu An (Huainan prince and literatus)
- Qu Yuan (most famous of attributed authors of the Chuci anthology)
- Xian (Taoism) ("Daoist immortals", or adepts who transcended merely mortal existence)
- Yu Shi (one aspect of Chisongzi, or Red Pine Master, in "Yuanyou" an exemplary xian)
- Zhu Rong (god) (ancient deity of the south and of fire, one of the deities mentioned in "Yuanyou")
