= Chu Ci =

Anthology of Chinese poetry

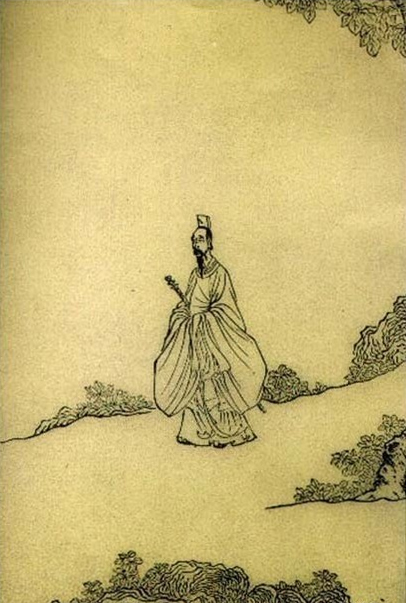
- Qu Yuan Sang while Walking (Quzi xingyin tu 屈子行吟圖), by Chen Hongshou (1616)
- Author: (trad.) Qu Yuan, Song Yu
- Original title: 楚辭
- Language: Classical Chinese
- Genre: Poetry
- Publication place: China

Chinese name
- Traditional Chinese: 楚辭
- Simplified Chinese: 楚辞
- Literal meaning: "Words of Chu"
Transcriptions
Standard Mandarin
- Hanyu Pinyin: Chǔ cí
- Gwoyeu Romatzyh: Chuu tsyr
- Wade–Giles: Ch'u^{3} tz'ŭ^{2}
- IPA: [ʈʂʰù tsʰɹ̩̌]
Wu
- Suzhounese: Tshou^{3} zy^{2}
Yue: Cantonese
- Yale Romanization: Chó chìh
- Jyutping: Co^{2} ci^{4}
- IPA: [tsʰɔ˧˥ tsʰi˩]
Southern Min
- Tâi-lô: Tshóo sû
Middle Chinese
- Middle Chinese: tʂ^{h}jó zi
Old Chinese
- Baxter–Sagart (2014): *s.r̥aʔ sə.lə

The Chu Ci, variously translated as Verses of Chu, Songs of Chu, or Elegies of Chu, is an ancient anthology of Chinese poetry including works traditionally attributed mainly to Qu Yuan and Song Yu from the Warring States period, as well as a large number of works composed during the Han dynasty several centuries later. The traditional version of the Chu Ci contains 17 major sections, anthologized with its current contents by Wang Yi, a 2nd-century AD librarian who served under Emperor Shun of Han. Classical Chinese poetry prior to the Qin dynasty is largely known through the Chu Ci and the Classic of Poetry.

== Background ==
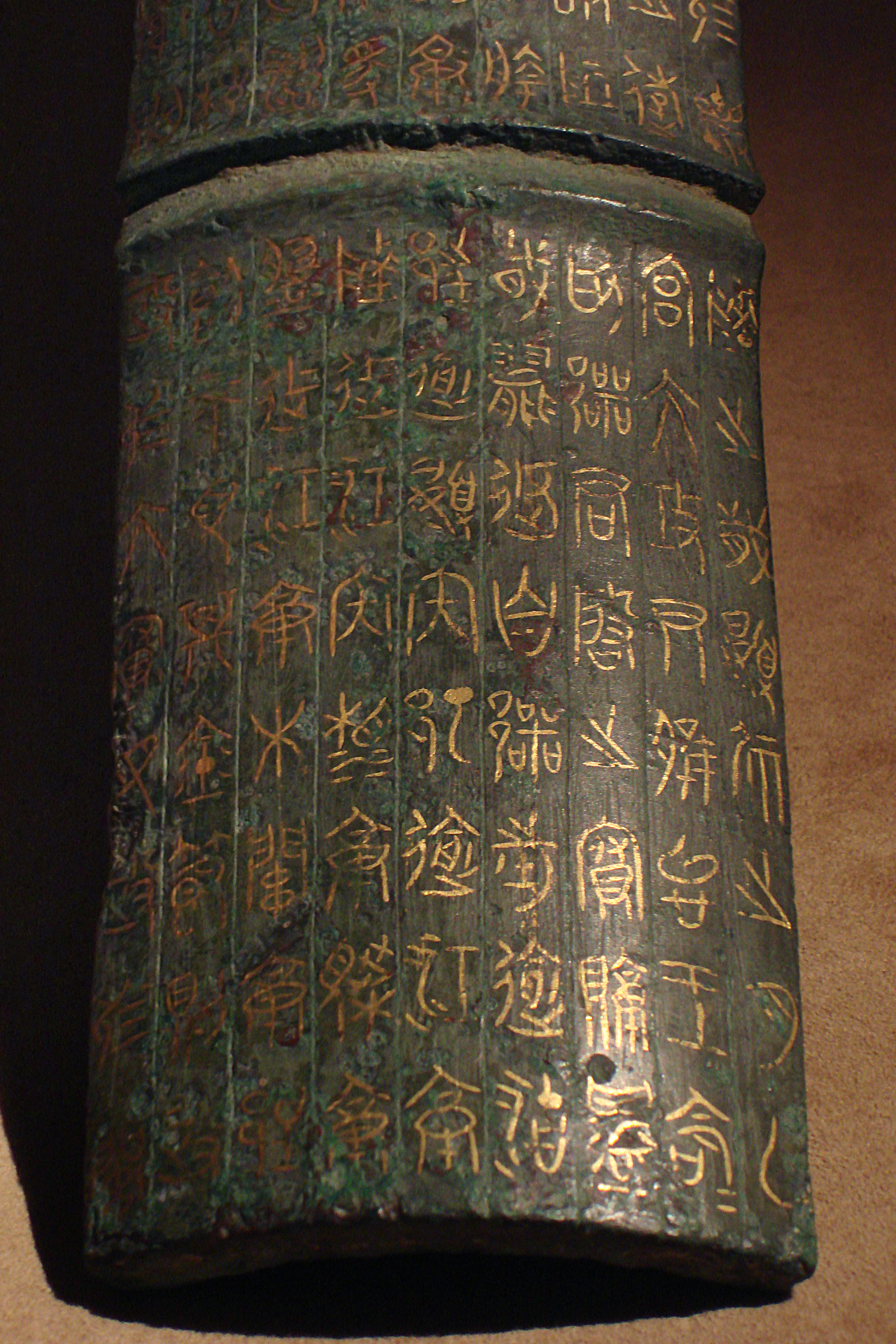
Detail of shou jie (shipping transit pass) issued to Prince Qi. Gold inscriptions on bronze in the shape of bamboo, issued by King Huai of Chu to the state of E, in 323 BCE.

The Chu Ci was named after a form of poetry that originated in the State of Chu, which was located in what is now central China, but was then in the southern fringe of the Chinese cultural area. The territory of Chu was known for its blend of culture from the Central Plain, or "north", with other cultural influences, associated with the "south". Thus, north Chinese sometimes viewed the Chu as part of "the south", which had a reputation for various exotic features. The Chu Ci verses characteristically strongly feature the presence of the exotic. A Chinese form of shamanism was prominent in Chu, and a large number of the Chu Ci verses describe "spirit journeys". However, southern influence was extremely insignificant, only limited to the ideas of shamanism and burial objects which were from the south; other than that literature, poetry, clothing and architecture all remained northern.

Other references to the exotic include encounters with various magical or fragrant plants and interaction with various spirits and deities, and travel to various exotic locations, such as the heavens, the ends of the earth, Bactria, and the Mount Kunlun of mythology.

The collection of poems by Qu Yuan and Song Yu are included in the Chu Ci, as well as works by other Chu poets (or poets writing in the Chu style), represent a certain development of an older tradition which eventually achieved a period of popularity and imperial favor during the Western Han dynasty. The Book of Han noted 106 Chu poets with 1,318 compositions. Many established Han poets also wrote in the Chu Ci style, producing their fair share of notable poems: the term Chu Ci can generically refer to the type of verse in this formal style of this type of verse. Other Chu Ci style verses were written, including some which survive, but are not generally included in the standard anthology. Wang Yi made an extensive commentary on the Chu Ci, as well as appending his own "Nine Longings", as the seventeenth and final section.

== Authorship and editing ==
Although Chu ci is an anthology of poems by many poets, Qu Yuan was its central figure, both as author of the Li Sao section and in the persona of protagonist. There are various other authors which are also thought to have written various sections of the Chu Ci, as well as some sections which may derive from some traditional source. Various scholarly sources propose solutions for who wrote what, in the Chu Ci, with more doubt or questions about some sections than others. Besides the actual authorship of the diverse material of the Chu Ci, another scholarly concern is in regard to the history of who and when these pieces were collected and anthologized into one work, and also what other editorial work was done. Besides the authorship of the actual content, much commentary has been written in regard to the Chu Ci, some of which is traditionally incorporated into the printed editions.

=== Qu Yuan ===
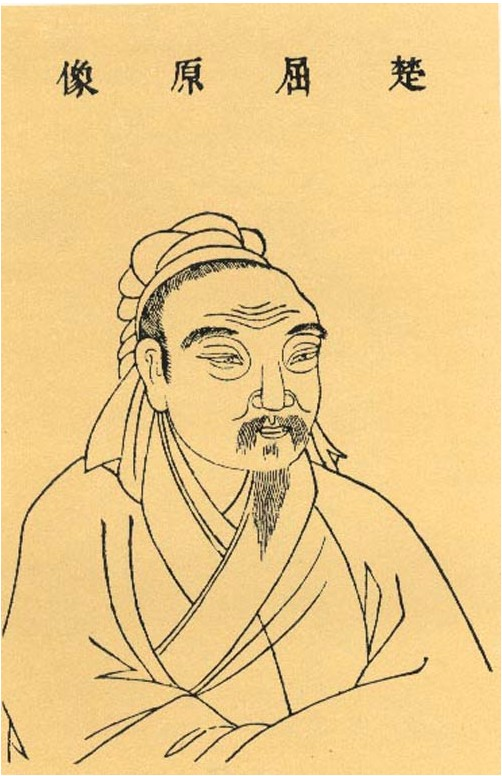
A depiction of Qu Yuan from an early 17th-century book

The name "Qu Yuan" does not occur in any text prior to the Han dynasty (202 BC – AD 220). According to common tradition, Qu Yuan was an administrative official in the court of King Huai of Chu (r. 328–299 BC) who advocated forming an alliance with the other states against the increasingly dominant power of the Qin kingdom, during the Warring States period; however, his advice was not taken and he was slandered by other officials in court: seeing the corruption of his colleagues and the inability of his king to appreciate his true worth, Qu Yuan went into exile and then finally committed suicide by wading into the Miluo River with a heavy rock, when Qin general Bo Qi sacked the Chu capital Ying in 278 BC, forcing the royal court to relocate with considerable loss of territory. It is also traditionally said that it is in remembrance of the circumstances of Qu Yuan's death that the annual Dragon boat races are held.

During his days of exile, Qu Yuan is thought to have written Li Sao. The authorship, as in many a case of ancient literature, can be neither confirmed nor denied. Written in 373 verses containing 2490 characters, Li Sao is a long Chinese poem.

Also, among the other Chu Ci works sometimes attributed to Qu Yuan, the Jiu Ge ("Nine Songs") exemplify shamanic literature in China.

=== Authorship ===
The traditional view of the Chu Ci, which went largely unchallenged until the 20th century, was that Qu Yuan wrote about half of the pieces in the Chu Ci, with the other half being ascribed to other poets associated with him or writing in his style. Modern scholars have devoted long studies to the question of the Chu Ci pieces' authorship, but there is no consensus on which may actually be by Qu Yuan himself.

Sima Qian's Records of the Grand Historian mentions five of Qu Yuan's works: Li Sao (or "Encountering Sorrow", "The Lament"), Tian Wen, Zhao Hun ("Summoning of the Soul"), Ai Ying ("Lament for Ying"), Huai Sha.

According to Wang Yi of the Eastern Han dynasty, a total of 25 works can be attributed to Qu Yuan: Li Sao, Jiu Ge (consisting of 11 pieces), Heavenly Questions (Tian Wen), Jiu Zhang (all 9 pieces), Yuan You, Pu Ju, and Yu Fu.

Wang Yi chose to attribute Zhao Hun to another contemporary of Qu Yuan, Song Yu; most modern scholars, however, consider Zhao Hun to be Qu Yuan's original work, whereas Yuan You, Pu Ju, and Yu Fu are believed to have been composed by others. Similarly, Wang's attribution of the Qijian to Dongfang Shuo is suspect.

=== Anthology ===
There are questions or uncertainties as to how the Chu Ci came to be collected into its present form; however, at least some outlines of this historical process have been presented in scholarly literature. Another important aspect of Chu Ci studies is the editorial history. One regard is the order in which the various titles appear. There are also reasons to believe that some of the sections (juan) were subject to editing for various reasons, including to suit the verses to theatrical performance and due to the nature of the textual process of ancient China, involving writing lines of text on individual bamboo strips which were bound together, but when the bindings broke were subject to editorial decisions as to what their original order was.

Wang Yi's selections of certain specific verses to anthologize in the modern Chu Ci has remained standard since its publication, towards the end of the Han dynasty. During the reign of Emperor Cheng of Han, Liu Xiang apparently arranged and compiled the poems of Qu Yuan and Song Yu, likely working from an earlier compilation by Liu An, as well as those of Han poets including Wang Bao, Jia Yi, Yan Ji (嚴忌) and Liu Xiang himself into the Chu Ci anthology as it is known today.

One of the important aspects of the Chu Ci is the body of commentary in this regard. Much of the initial surviving annotation of the standard editions of the Chu Ci was provided by Wang Yi, the Han royal librarian.

== Contents ==
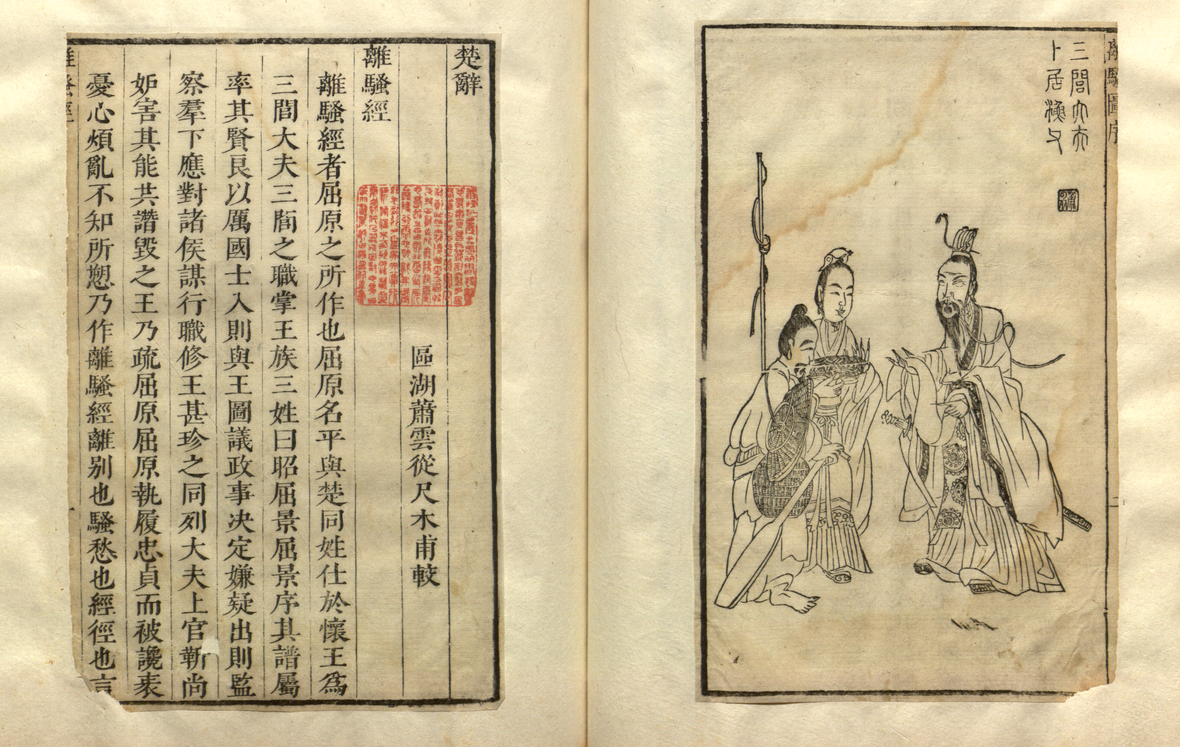
Two pages of "Encountering Sorrow", from a 1645 copy of the Chu Ci, illustrated by Xiao Yuncong, showing the poem "Encountering Sorrow", with the character 經 (jing), appended as a status reference to the Chinese Classics.

The Chu Ci consists of seventeen main sections, in standard versions, with some accompanying commentary standard. Chu Ci begins with "Li Sao", a poem which assumes biographical material about Qu Yuan with his relationship with the person of King Huai, ruler of Chu. Critics historically often interpret the "Li Sao" as political allegory, yet religious and mythological aspects arise, which derive from the culture of Chu. The second section, in standard modern order, the "Jiu Ge", despite its title translating to "Nine songs", actually includes eleven discrete parts. These seem to represent some shamanistic dramatic practices of the Yangzi River valley area involving the invocation of divine beings and seeking their blessings by means of a process of courtship. "Heavenly Questions" ("Tian Wen"), also known as Questions to Heaven, addressed to Tian (or "Heaven"), consists of series of questions, 172 in all, in verse format. The series of questions asked involves Chinese mythology and ancient Chinese religious beliefs. In general, the text of the Heavenly Questions asks questions; but, the text does not include answers, except, in some cases, in hints.

"Nine Pieces" ("Jiu Zhang") consists of nine pieces of poetry, one of which is the "Lament for Ying" ("Ai Ying"). Ying was the name of one of the traditional capital cities of Qu Yuan's homeland of Chu (eventually, Ying and Chu even became synonymous). However, both the city of Ying and the entire state of Chu itself experienced doom due to the expansion of the state of Qin, which ended up consolidating China at the expense of the other former independent states: including Qu Yuan's home state. "Jiu Zhang" includes a total of nine pieces (Text in Chinese: 九章).

Also included are "Far-off Journey" ("Yuan You") (遠遊), "Divination" "Bu Ju" (卜居), "The Fisherman" "Yu Fu" (漁父), "Nine Changes" (九辯), "Summons of the Soul" "(Zhao Hun)" (招魂), "The Great Summons" (大招), "Sorrow for Troth Betrayed" (惜誓), "Summons for a Recluse" (招隱士), "Seven Remonstrances" (七諫), "Alas That My Lot Was Not Cast" (哀時命), "Nine Regrets", consisting of nine sections (九懷), "Nine Laments" (九歎), and "Nine Longings" (九思).

=== Poetic qualities ===
The poems and pieces of the Chu ci anthology vary, in formal poetic style. Chu ci includes varying metrics, varying use of exclamatory particles, and the varying presence of the luan (envoi). The styles of the Chu Ci compare and contrast with the poems of the Shi Jing anthology (Classic of Poetry, or "Song" style), with the typical Han poetry styles, and with Qu Yuan's style in The Lament.

==== Song style ====
Some Chuci poems use the typical Book of Songs (Shijing) four syllable line, with its four equally stressed syllables:

tum tum tum tum

This is sometimes varied by the use of a pronoun or nonce word in the fourth (or final) place, in alternate lines, thus weakening the stress of the fourth syllable of the even lines:

tum tum tum ti

where "tum" stands for a stressed syllable and "ti" stands for the unstressed nonce syllable of choice. Heavenly Questions (Tian wen), Summons of the Soul (Zhao hun), and The Great Summons (Da Zhao) all have metrical characteristics typical of the Shijing. Generally, the Shijing style (both in Shijing and in Chuci) groups these lines into rhymed quatrains. Thus, the standard building block of the Song style poetry is a quatrain with a heavy, thumping sound quality:

tum tum tum tum

tum tum tum tum

tum tum tum tum

tum tum tum tum

The variant song style verse (one type of "7-plus") used seven stressed (or accented) syllables followed by an unstressed (or weakly accented) final syllable on alternate (even) lines:

tum tum tum tum

tum tum tum ti

tum tum tum tum

tum tum tum ti

"Heavenly Questions" shares the prosodic features typical of Shijing: four character lines, a predominant tendency toward rhyming quatrains, and occasional alternation by using weak (unstressed) line final syllables in alternate lines.

The "Great Summons" and the "Summons for the Soul" poetic form (the other kind of "7-plus") varies from this pattern by uniformly using a standard nonce word refrain throughout a given piece, and that alternating stressed and unstressed syllable finals to the lines has become the standard verse form. The nonce word used as a single-syllable refrain in various ancient Chinese classical poems varies: (according to modern pronunciation), "Summons for the Soul" uses xie and the "Great Summons" uses zhi (and the "Nine Pieces" uses xi). Any one of these unstressed nonce words seem to find a similar role in the prosody. This two line combo:

[first line:] tum tum tum tum; [second line:] tum tum tum ti

tends to produce the effect of one, single seven character line with a caesura between the first four syllables and the concluding three stressed syllables, with the addition of a weak nonsense refrain syllable final

tum tum tum tum [caesura] tum tum tum ti.

==== Han-style lyrics ====
Within the individual songs or poems of the "Nine Pieces", lines generally consist of various numbers of syllables, separated by the nonce word. In this case, the nonce word of choice is 兮 (pinyin: xī, Old Chinese: *gˤe). This, as opposed to the four-character verse of the Shi Jing, adds a different rhythmic latitude of expression.

==== Sao style ====
Some verses tend towards the sao style, based on imitation of the "Li Sao". The sao style features long line lengths optimized for poetic oral recitation, with a concluding luan (or, envoi).

The scholar and translator David Hawkes divides the verses of what seem to be of the earlier (pre-Han era), into two types, each type being characterized by one of two characteristic metrical forms (with the exception of the mixed poetry and prose narratives of the "Divination" and of "The Fisherman").

Direct influences of the Chu Ci verses can be seen in the saoti (騷體) style of prosody as seen in the "Epilog" of the Cantong qi (the "Luanci", 亂辭), and in anthologies such as the Guwen Guanzhi. Furthermore, the verses of the Chu Ci would have been recited using distinctive linguistic features of the Chu version of Chinese language, together with various rare characters, which together with some of the vocabulary and the characters themselves also vary from the typical northern literature; thus, the poems of the Chu Ci remain as a major factor in the study of Classical Chinese poetry, cultural, and linguistic history, and the various poems or prose-poems influenced subsequent literature, including other Han poetry, and subsequent Classical Chinese poetry.

=== Mythology and religion ===
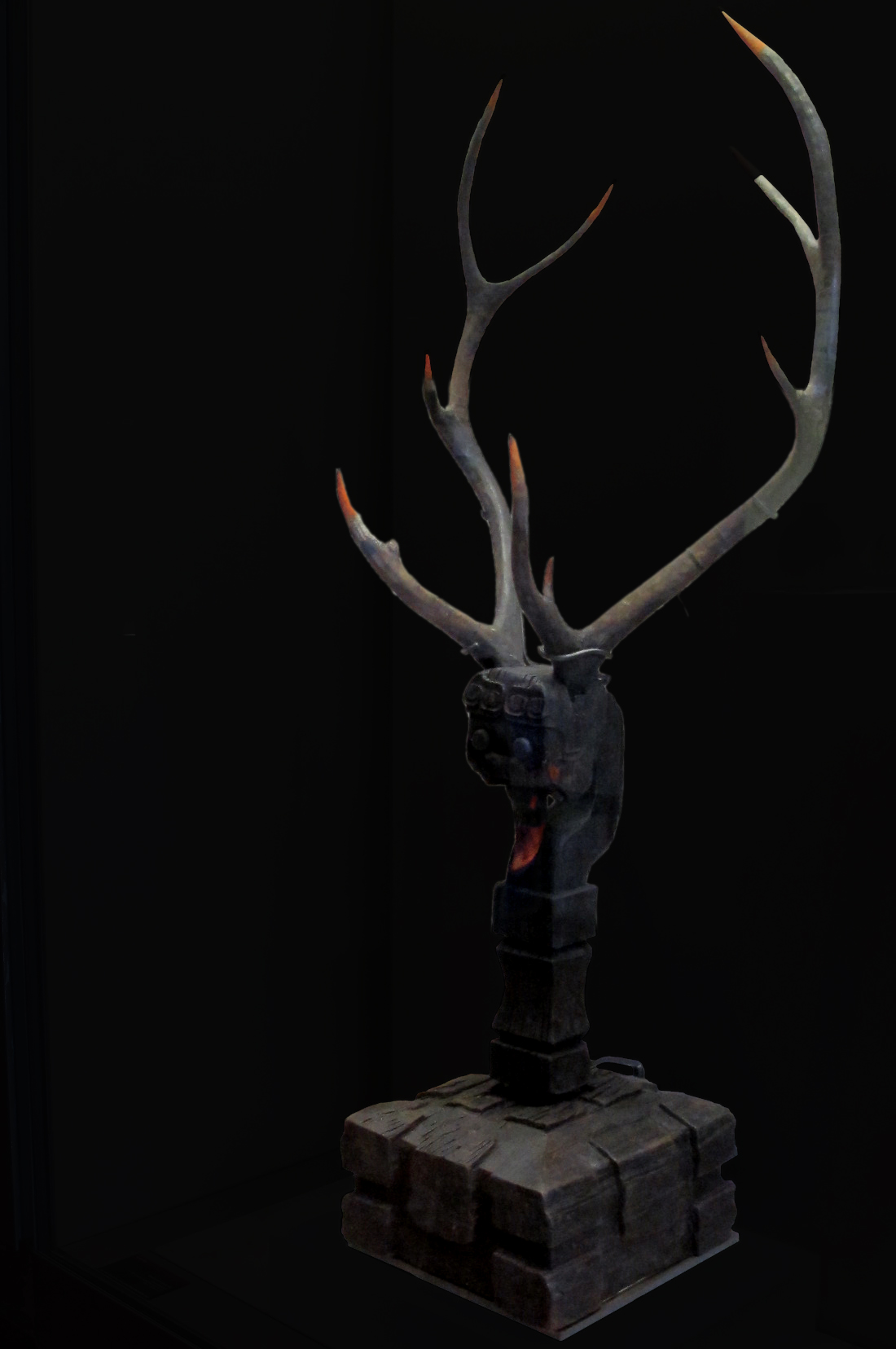
Tomb Beast-Guard (Zhenmushou). 5th – 3rd century BCE, Kingdom of Chu, Southern China.

Not only have the various poems or prose-poems influenced subsequent literature, but the contents of this material are a major primary source for historical information about the culture and religious beliefs in the territorial area of the former Kingdom of Chu. Some sections of the Chu songs consist of especially dense mythological material, such as the "Heavenly Questions". More general religious or philosophical questions such as regarding the existence of spirit receive some poetic treatment in the Chu Ci.

==== Beasts and beings ====
Information on mythological beings in early Chinese mythology is often based upon references from the Chu Ci as one of a few surviving primary sources from ancient times: among which are references to the ambiguously horned dragon (qiulong), crocodilian dragon (jiaolong), the immortal xian and zhenren of later Daoist fame, the giant bashe serpent, the hong rainbow dragon, the feilong flying dragon, and the zhulong Torch Dragon. Also, information of the meaning of and in regard to the Chinese characters used for the teng, the shi and chi also has been derived using the Chu Ci as a primary source.

==== Myths ====
The myths of Nüwa, Tian, the ancient sovereign Shun, and the Great Flood are among those importantly receiving treatment in the Chu Ci material. Among these are materials relating to the Xiang River goddesses and the legendary tale of how spotted bamboo got its spots.

==== Shamanism ====
The contents of the Chu Ci are a major primary source for historical information about the culture and religious beliefs in the territorial area of the former Kingdom of Chu. The beliefs reflected in these poems seem to be related to the beliefs of the preceding Shang and the Zhou dynasties; but, yet to have retained indications of shamanistic practices. Themes of flight or excursion are typical of shamanism and are frequently encountered throughout the Chu Ci verses. Both "Encountering Sorrow" and the "Nine Songs" share a floral symbolism together with flights through the air involving intimate meetings with divine beings.

== Later history ==
The Chuci material, or at least some of it, has been a major influence on Classical Chinese poetry in multiple genres. It has also been translated into a number of other languages, including English, which has extended its influence even further.

=== Prominence ===
The Chu Ci never became a canonical work, not in the sense as did the Shi Jing. As David Hawkes puts it, "[t]he Chu Ci poems, however popular, belonged to no canon, dealt in matters that were outlandish and unorthodox, and originated outside of the area of sanctified Western Zhou tradition." However, part of the Chu Ci tradition includes a Confucian outlook, glorifying the loyal minister who prefers death over compromising his integrity. Following its publication during the Han, the Chu Ci was subject to various editorial treatment, including various commentaries and editions. The order in which the sections of the Chu ci are currently generally arranged was established through editorial re-arrangement during or following the tenth or eleventh century. However, this is not true of Li Sao. In the Wang Yi edition, it is titled "Lisaojing". The other works of the Chu Ci generally fall in the category of exegesis or amplification upon the original "classic" text.

The influence of the Chu Ci projects itself through the works of poets, including Jia Yi, Shen Quanqi, Zhang Yue, Du Fu, Han Yu, Liu Zongyuan, and Su Shi.

=== Translation into English ===
In addition to the translations by David Hawkes cited above, translations into English include:

- Hawkes, David (translator). Chapter 5 in J. Minford & J. S. M. Lau (Eds.) (2000). Classical Chinese Literature: An Anthology of Translations, Vol. I: From Antiquity to the Tang Dynasty. New York: Columbia University Press, ISBN 0-231-09676-3.
- Williams, Nicholas Morrow (2022). Elegies of Chu: An Anthology of Early Chinese Poetry. Oxford: Oxford University Press, ISBN 978-0-198-81831-1.
- Sun Dayu (translator). (2007). Selected Poems of Chu Yuan (Chinese-English edition). Shanghai: Foreign Language Education Press, ISBN 978-7-5446-0459-8.
- Waters, Geoffrey R. Three Elegies of Ch'u: an Introduction to the Traditional Interpretation of the Ch'u Tz'u. University of Wisconsin Press, 1985. ISBN 978-0-299-10030-8.
- Gladys Yang and Xianyi Yang, Chu ci Xuan Selected Elegies of the State of Chu. Beijing: Foreign Languages Press, 2001. ISBN 7-119-02890-1.
- Fusheng Wu, "Sao Poetry," pp. 36–58, in Zong-Qi Cai, ed., How to Read Chinese Poetry: A Guided Anthology. New York: Columbia University Press, 2008 ISBN 978-0-231-13940-3. Background on the poems and their form; side by side columns of Chinese characters, pinyin pronunciation, and English translations for "The Lord of the Xiang River" (attrib. Qu Yuan), "The Lady of the Xiang River" (attrib. Qu Yuan), and "On Encountering Trouble" (Qu Yuan). ISBN 9780231511889
- Xu, Yuanchong (translator). Elegies of the South. 2008. ISBN 978-7-5001-2022-3
- Zhuo, Zhenying (2006). 楚辞 [The Verse of Chu]. Library of Chinese Classics. Changsha: Hunan People's Publishing House.
- Sukhu, Gopal (2012). The Shaman and the Heresiarch: A New Interpretation of the Li sao. SUNY Series in Chinese Philosophy and Culture. Albany: State University of New York Press.
- Sukhu, Gopal (2017). The Songs of Chu: An Anthology of Ancient Chinese Poetry by Qu Yuan and Others. Translations from the Asian Classics. New York: Columbia University Press.
- Mingyuan Hu, Lament in Love: The Verses of Qu Yuan. London: Hermits United, 2024. ISBN 9781739115647.

== Authors ==
- Liu An
- Liu Xiang (scholar)
- Qu Yuan
- Song Yu
- Wang Yi (librarian)
- Zhuang Ji

== See also ==
- List of Chu Ci contents
- List of mythical Chinese mountains (mythological mountains, all or most of which feature in the Chu ci)
- List of wu shaman
- Moon rabbit
- Shuanggudui (site of archeological finds, including bamboo strip texts related to the Chu ci and fragments of the work itself)
- Zhuang Ji
