= Zhúlóng (galaxy) =

Galaxy in the constellation Sextans

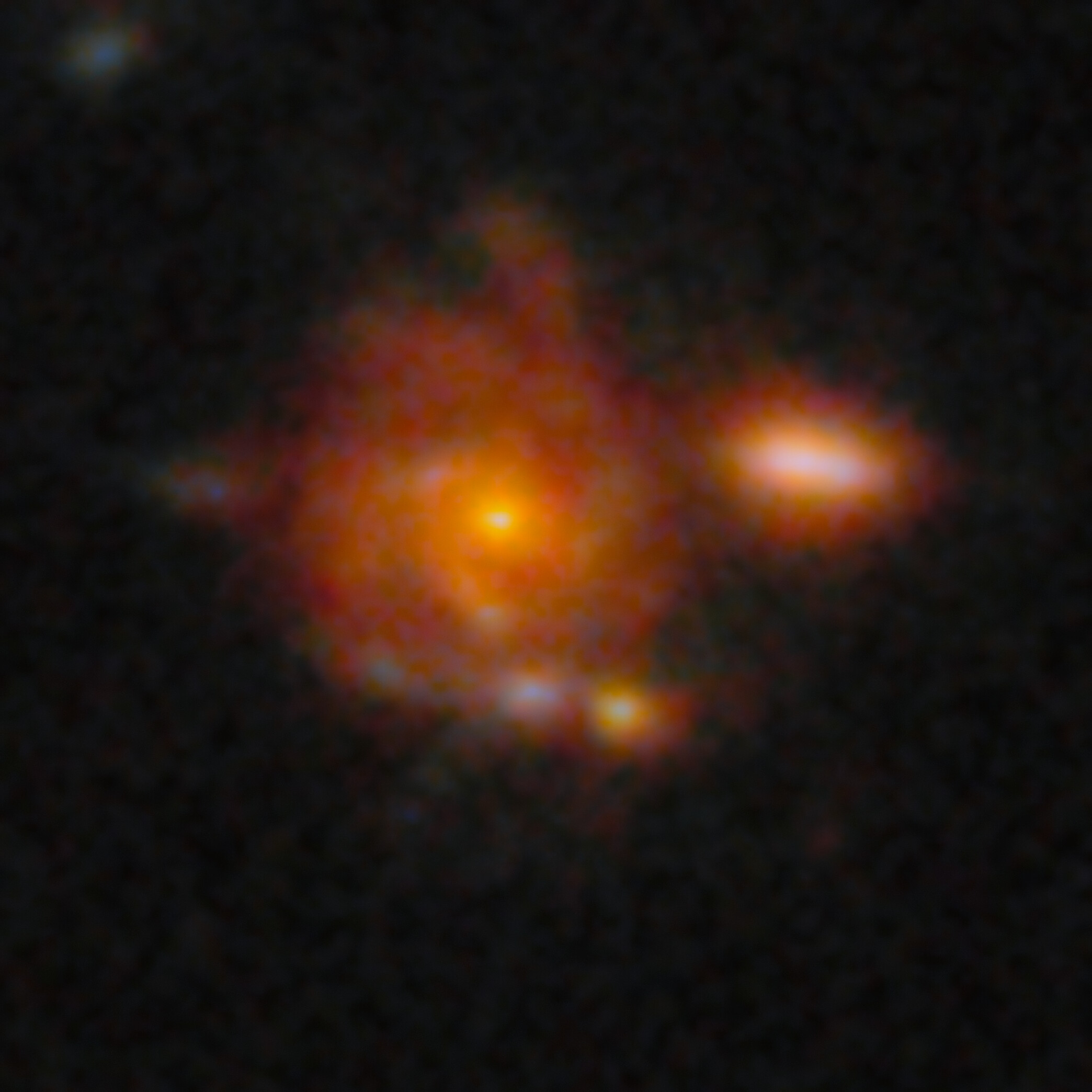
- Zhúlóng imaged by the James Webb Space Telescope

Observation data (J2000 epoch)
- Constellation: Sextans
- Right ascension: 10^{h} 00^{m} 29.97^{s}
- Declination: +02° 05′ 34.51″
- Redshift: 5.2
- Distance: 3.9 Gpc (12.8 Gly) (Light travel distance); 8.3 Gpc (27 Gly) (present comoving distance)

Characteristics
- Type: Sbc
- Size: ~62 kly (19 kpc) (estimated)
- Apparent size (V): 3″ × 3″
- Notable features: Most distant known grand design spiral galaxy

Zhúlóng is an extremely massive grand-design spiral galaxy located at a redshift distance of z=5.2 (12.8 Gly) in the constellation of Sextans. It is believed to be the most distant known grand design spiral galaxy. Spiral galaxies beyond redshift 3.0 are generally rare with only a few known.

The galaxy has well-defined spiral arms that have dense star formation regions while the core is quiescent. However the rate of star formation is low, forming 66 solar masses of stars per year. The size of this galaxy is comparable to the Milky Way galaxy, being an estimated 62,000 light years in diameter. It has a mass of around 100 billion solar masses.

== Naming ==
The galaxy was named Zhúlóng (燭龍), meaning “Torch Dragon” in Chinese mythology. In the myth, Zhúlóng is a powerful red solar dragon that creates day and night by opening and closing its eyes, symbolizing light and cosmic time.

== Discovery ==
Zhúlóng was discovered by a team led by Mengyuan Xiao, and announced in a paper submitted to Astronomy & Astrophysics on 17 December 2024, and published on 16 April 2025. The discovery was surprising to astronomers, who had previously believed that spiral galaxies took billions of years to develop.

== Image gallery ==
PANORAMIC Survey showing position of Zhúlóng, imaged by the James Webb Space Telescope
