= Bashe =

Mythological serpent

Bashe (Chinese: 巴蛇; pinyin: bā-shé; Wade–Giles: pa-she) was a python-like Chinese mythological giant snake that ate elephants.

== Name ==
The term bashe compounds ba 巴 "elephant-eating snake" (Note: 巴 is also a loangraph for "a proper name; tip, tail; crust; greatly desire; cling to; be near") and she 蛇 "snake; serpent".

The Chinese character 巴 for ba was graphically simplified from ancient Oracle bone script and Seal script pictograms of a long-tailed snake. In early Written Chinese usage, ba 巴 frequently referred to the Zhou dynasty (1122 BCE – 256 BCE) state of Ba, which was located in present-day eastern Sichuan. In Modern Standard Chinese usage, ba 巴 often transcribes foreign loanwords such as ba 巴 "bar (unit)", Bali 巴黎 "Paris", or Guba 古巴 "Cuba". Ba 巴 is a variant Chinese character for ba 把 "grasp; handle", ba 笆 "bamboo; fence", or ba 芭 in bajiao 芭蕉 "banana" (using ba 巴 as the phonetic element with graphic radicals for 扌 "hand", 竹 "bamboo", and 艹 "plant").

Bashe not only names this mythical giant reptile but is also a variant Chinese name for the South Asian ran 蚺 or mang 蟒 "python" (and South American "boa constrictor" or African "mamba"). "Mythical draconyms often derive from names of larger reptilians", says Carr and "Since pythons usually crush their prey and swallow them whole, one can imagine Chinese tales about southern ran 蚺 'pythons' being exaggerated into legendarily-constipated bashe 'giant snakes' that ate an elephant every three years". In literary usage, bashe is found in the four-character idiom bashetunxiang 巴蛇吞象 (lit. "ba-snake gulping down an elephant") meaning "inordinately greedy; extremely insatiable".

== Early textual occurrences ==
The earliest references to the legendary bashe 巴蛇 are in the Chuci and Shanhaijing, two Chinese classic texts containing Warring States period (475 BCE – 221 BCE) materials compiled during the Han dynasty (206 BCE – 220 CE).

The Chuci is an anthology of Chinese poems (see Qu Yuan) from the southern state of Chu and it mentions bashe in the Tianwen 天問 "Heavenly Questions" section. The preeminent Chuci translator David Hawkes describes the Tianwen as a "somewhat odd combination of archaic riddles with questions of a speculative or philosophical nature" and believes "it started as an ancient, priestly riddle-text (a sort of catechism to be used for mnemonic purposes) which was rewritten and greatly enlarged by a secular poet". This mythological questionnaire asks:

Where are the hornless dragons which carry bears on their backs for sport? Where is the great serpent with nine heads and where is the Shu Hu? Where is it that people do not age? Where do giants live? Where is the nine-branched weed? Where is the flower of the Great Hemp? How does the snake that can swallow an elephant digest its bones?

— tr. Hawkes

The Shanhaijing is an ancient Chinese mytho-geography. Chapter 10, the "Haineinan jing" 海內南經 "Classic of Regions within the Seas: South" describes a legendary land where bashe lived:

The Big Snake eats elephants and after three years it disgorges their bones. Gentlemen take a dose of this snake so that they will never have heart disease or illnesses of the belly. The snakes of Bigsnake country are green, or yellow, or scarlet, or black. One author says the black snakes have a green head. The land of Bigsnake lies west of Rhinoceros country.

— tr. Birrell

The Shanhaijing commentary by Guo Pu (276–324 CE) compares the ba snake with the southern ran 蚺 "python", which after eating a large animal can wind around a tree trunk and expel the bones from between its scales and notes they could grow up to a length of 100 xun 尋 (about 270 meters). Guo's commentary likewise notes this exaggerated length for the changshe 長蛇 "long snake" that the Shanhaijing locates on Daxian 大咸 Mountain "Mount Bigwhole": "There is a snake here named the long-snake; its hair is like pig bristles. It makes a noise like a nightwatchman banging his rattle".

The 1578 CE Bencao Gangmu entry for ranshe 蚺蛇 "python" mentions the bashe:

The Shan-Hai-Ching says that pythons can eat elephants, the bones of which they emit every three years. Gentlemen who take these bones as medicine never suffer from heart or visceral ailments. They are referred to as Pa She, that is the great snake.

— tr. Read

Compare how the Shanhaijing description of the ba-snake's sympathetic magic is interpreted as eating the snake (Birrell "take a dose of this snake" and Schiffeler "swallow its flesh") or eating the undigested elephant bones (Read "take these bones as medicine"). This materia medica lists uses for python bile, flesh, fat, teeth, and oil. The Bencao Gangmu says pythons can reach lengths of 50–60 chi 尺 (about 16–20 meters), but Python molurus grow up to 5.8 meters and Python reticulatus 9.2 meters.

The Chinese folklore scholar Wolfram Eberhard links bashe with the legendary archer Houyi 后翌 who descended from heaven to destroy evildoers. One of Houyi's victims was a monstrous serpent in Lake Dongting, the xiushe 修蛇 "adorned/long snake" (or changshe 長蛇, cf. above). Eberhard concludes giant snakes such as the xiushe, bashe, and ranshe "were typical for the South", but were not part of a snake cult like those among the ancient Baiyue.

== See also ==
- Snakes in Chinese mythology
