= List of mythological Chinese mountains =

Mythological mountains are an important motif in Chinese mythology and related mythologies. Some mountains are more mythological than others with some only having conjectural relations to real mountains. In some cases historical records indicate that explorers named newly charted mountains after mythological mountains; thus, sometimes real mountains were named after mythological mountains.

For example, the identification of Kunlun kept moving west (when it was not stated to be in the south). In other cases, the mountains seem real enough, but a mythological or fictional layer or layers have been added to their description; for example, the stories told about the Flaming Mountains.

Due to the features of Chinese vocabulary, syntax, and resulting translations, it is not clear whether a given "mountain" is one mountain, a mountain range, or merely a significant hill, though mythological exaggeration occurs. For example, some mountains are said to reach up into Heaven. Mountains or mythological mountains significantly related to Chinese and related mythology include:

- Eight Pillars: eight mountains holding the earth and heaven apart.
- Feather Mountain: a place of exile during or just after the world flood and other events.
- Flaming Mountains: located in the Tian Shan range of Central Asia. Subject of Chinese stories and Uyghur mythology.
- Jade Mountain: in some accounts the dwelling of Xiwangmu, Queen Mother of the West.
- Kunlun Mountain: a mythical mountain, dwelling of various divinities and fabulous plants and animals.
- Mount Buzhou: mythological mountain, one of the Pillars holding the earth and sky apart, damaged by Gong Gong.
- Mount Penglai: paradise; a fabled isle in the China Sea.
