= Yu Fu =

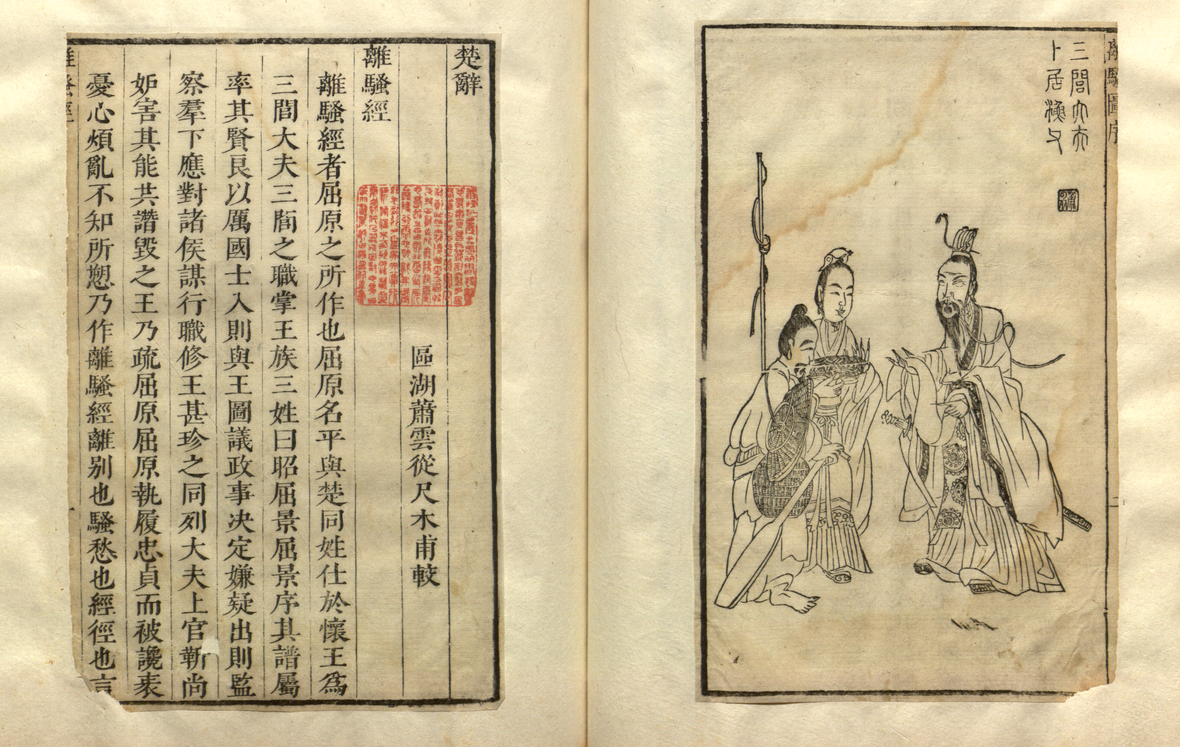
Qu Yuan conversing with fisherman.

"Yu Fu" or "The Fisherman" (traditional Chinese: 漁父; simplified Chinese: 渔父; pinyin: yú fù; lit. 'fisherman') is a short work anthologized in the Chu Ci (楚辭 Songs of Chu, sometimes called The Songs of the South. Traditionally attributed to Qu Yuan, there is little likelihood that he is the actual author (Hawkes 2011 [1985]: 203). Rather, "Yu fu" is a biographical or pseudobiographical account of an incident in poet and scholar Qu Yuan's life. It is mostly in prose, but with a short, incidental verse known as "the fisherman's song". This song, and the accompanying prose description of Qu Yuan's encounter with a fisherman during his exile are well known in Classical Chinese literature. Furthermore, "Yu fu" represents a common motif: the story of the encounter between a scholar and a fisherman also appears in the Zhuangzi, chapter 31, as an encounter between Confucius and a fisherman. There are a number of other Daoist parables of a similar nature; and, the fisherman's song itself appears in identical form in the Mencius, but there put into the mouth of a child, instead of an old fisherman. (Hawks 2011 [1985]: 204 and 207)

== See also ==
- Fish in Chinese mythology
- Great Wave Pavilion
