= Song Yu =

Chinese poet (3rd century BCE)

- Chinese: 宋玉
Transcriptions
Standard Mandarin
- Hanyu Pinyin: Sòng Yù
- Wade–Giles: Sung^{4} Yü^{4}
- IPA: [sʊ̂ŋ ŷ]
Yue: Cantonese
- Yale Romanization: Sung Yuhk
- Jyutping: Sung^{3} Juk^{6}
- IPA: [sʊŋ˧ jʊk̚˨]
Southern Min
- Hokkien POJ: Sòng Gio̍k
Old Chinese
- Baxter–Sagart (2014): *[s]ˤung-s [ng](r)ok

Song Yu (Note: In this Chinese name, the family name is Song.) (Chinese: 宋玉; Wade–Giles: Sung Yü; fl. 298–263 BC) was a Chinese poet from the late Warring States period, and is known as the traditional author of a number of poems in the Verses of Chu (Chu ci). Among the Verses of Chu poems usually attributed to Song Yu are those in the Jiu Bian section. Also credited to Song Yu are several fu collected in the 6th century literary anthology Wen Xuan.

== Biography ==
Biographic information about Song Yu tends to be anecdotal, rather than truly historical, and little reliable information about Song's life exists. Historical accounts agree that Song was from the state of Chu, and was born in the city of Yan 鄢 (modern Yicheng, Hubei Province), and lived during the reign of King Xiang of Chu (r. 298–263 BC).

He was likely a protege of Qu Yuan who succeeded him as a court poet after Qu's suicide. Both Song and Qu's work, especially in the elegiac Chu Ci, are remembered as mournful of the downfall of King Xiang and Chu.

== Works ==
According to the section covering literature and art in the Book of Han, Song wrote 16 works, but only 14 of them have been handed down, such as Jiu Bian and Dengtuzi Haose Fu (登徒子好色赋). However, it is uncertain if, with the exception of Jiu Bian, these works were actually written by Song. As a writer of cifu, Song was an accomplished successor to Qu Yuan with his own original style. In the fu poems attributed to Song Yu in the Wen Xuan literary anthology compiled by Xiao Tong (501–531), the poems appear in the context of a purported dialogue between Song Yu and King Xiang of Chu, in which the King requests a fu on a certain subject. However, this is likely to be a literary device deployed by a later author, rather than an authentic historical record of a real event. Song's name has long been put together with Qu Yuan's as "Qu-Song".

=== Summoning the Soul (Zhao Hun 招魂) ===
Wang Yi the noted Chu Ci anthologist and commentator also attributes the "Zhao Hun" (Summons of the Soul) to Song Yu.

=== Rhapsody on Gaotang (Gaotang Fu 高唐賦) ===
The narrative of Gaotang Fu follows a meeting at the Gaotang Shrine between King Huai of Chu and the love goddess Yaoji, who is associated with Mount Wu. She offers him her "pillow and mat" in his service. Academic Zhang Zhenjun has referred to the poem as "likely the earliest extant narrative about an erotic dream in Chinese literature" As a prototypical erotic narrative, Gaotang Fu remained influential for popular Chinese literature by successive writers, including Tao Qian.

=== Rhapsody on the Goddess (Shennu fu 神女賦) ===
Shennu Fu follows another meeting between a king and goddess, with Huai's son and successor King Xiang and an unnamed goddess. Whereas the Gaotang Fu deity is generally rendered as a love goddess, interpretations of Shennu Fu generally depict her as a Goddess of Beauty. Academic Ye Zhuxian wrote of the goddess that she "makes the man attracted to her give up his intimate desire after seducing him[,] [. . .] interrupting King Xiang of Chu’s fervent wish to recreate his father’s erotic dream."

== Legacy ==
With Qu Yuan, he is regarded as one of the definitive poets of the era. Song remained a reference point for other Chinese writers of successive centuries. Han dynasty poet Wang Can consciously echoed Song's Rhapsody of the Wind in his own Rhapsody on the Great Heat, composed with Chen Lin and Liu Zhen. The Tang dynasty poet Du Fu wrote "deep knowledge have I of Song Yu's grief" and that Song's work deeply influenced his own. In the Song Dynasty, Ouyang Xiu drew from Song Yu's "Nine Variations" for his own essay "The Sounds of Autumn".

Song Yu's main contribution to Classical Chinese poetry can be considered to be the development of the theme of nature together with an implicit sense of inherent pathos. Apart from proving a rich source of reference points for Chinese poets in centuries to come, many Chinese idioms that are still widely used today can be traced back to his poems. The metaphor "chariot-umbrella heaven" (gai tian 蓋天) stemmed from an idiom attributed to Song about a predominant cosmological view of his time, that "the square earth is my chariot, and the round heaven is my canopy".

== Attributed works ==
- "Summoning the Soul" (Zhao hun 招魂)
- "Rhapsody on the Wind" (Feng fu 風賦)
- "Nine Variations" (Jiubian 九辯)
- "Rhapsody on Gaotang" (Gaotang fu 高唐賦)
- "Rhapsody on the Goddess" (Shennu fu 神女賦)

== See also ==
- List of Chu Ci contents
- Liu An
- Liu Xiang (scholar)
