= The Great Summons =

"The Great Summons" or "Da Zhao" (Chinese: 大招; pinyin: Dà zhāo; lit. 'The Great Summons') is one of the poems anthologized in the ancient Chinese poetry collection, the Chu ci, also known as The Songs of the South. "The Great Summons" consists of a single poem without introduction or epilog. Its authorship has been attributed to Qu Yuan and to the otherwise relatively unknown Jing Cuo. (Hawkes, 2011 [1985]: 232-233) It is very similar, but shorter, than another of the Chu ci poems, Zhao Hun, ("Summons of the Soul"). Both poems derive from a shamanic tradition of summoning the soul of the someone who has seemed to die, most likely originally with the intention of having it to re-animate its former body (but in the later literary tradition this was meant more allegorically). The two poems both follow a similar pattern: threats of dangers lurking in all directions to which the soul might wander and then tempting descriptions of magnificent sensual pleasures which would be available as a reward for the souls obedient return. (Hawkes, 2011 [1985]: 219-221)

== Interpretations ==
Various interpretations of "The Great Summons" have been made, as to whose soul is being summoned, by whom, and in what context. According to a historically unlikely tradition, Qu Yuan was on the verge of suicide for political reasons, and wrote "The Great Summons" to persuade himself to cling to life.

== Selection from "The Great Summons" ==
In the "Great Summons", food is described with a rhapsodic and worldly joy. "The Great Summons" describes a sumptuous feast, designed to tempt a fleeing soul back to the body when it is on the point of fleeing away permanently:

魂乎归来 乐不可言只
五谷六仞 设菰梁只
鼎臑盈望 和致芳只
内鶬鸽鹄 味豺羹只
魂乎归来 恣所尝只

Translation:

O Soul come back to joys beyond all telling!
Where thirty cubits high at harvest time
The corn is stacked;
Where pies are cooked of millet and bearded maize.
Guests watch the steaming bowls
And sniff the pungency of peppered herbs.
The cunning cook adds slices of bird-flesh,
Pigeon and yellow heron and black crane.
They taste the badger-stew.
O Soul come back to feed on foods you love!

鲜蠵甘鸡 和楚酪只
醢豚苦狗 脍苴蒪只
吴酸蒿蒌 不沾薄只
魂兮归来 恣所择只

Translation:

Next are brought
Fresh turtle, and sweet chicken cooked with cheese
Pressed by the men of Ch'ü.
And flesh of whelps floating in liver sauce
With salad of minced radishes in brine;
All served with that hot spice of southernwood
The land of Wu supplies.
O Soul come back to choose the meats you love!

煎鰿臛雀 遽爽存只
魂乎归来 丽以先只

Translation:

Roasted daw, steamed widgeon and grilled quail—On every fowl they fare.
Boiled perch and sparrow broth—in each preserved
The separate flavor that is most its own.
O Soul come back to where such dainties wait!

== See also ==
- Chu (state)
- Chuci
- List of Chuci contents
- Qu Yuan
- 大招 (Wikisource, in Chinese)
