= List of poems in Chinese or by Chinese poets =

This is a list of Chinese poems in the broad sense of referring to those poems which have been written in Chinese, translated from Chinese, authored by a Chinese poet, or which have a Chinese geographic origin. Chinese poems are poetry written, spoken, or chanted in the Chinese language. The various versions of Chinese include Classical Chinese, Standard Chinese and other historical and vernacular types. In other words, Chinese poetry refers to poetry written or spoken in the Chinese language. The various versions of Chinese poetry, as known historically and to the general knowledge of the modern world, include two primary types, Classical Chinese poetry and modern Chinese poetry.

== List of Chinese poems (in Wikipedia) ==
This is a list of poems written in China, in Chinese, or by Chinese authors appearing in Wikipedia. The list is variously sortable by clicking on the radio buttons (up-and-down arrows/triangles) in the column-headers.

| Title or descriptive name | Author (Note: or anonymous) | Poetic era (Chinese) | Dates | Chinese poetry collection | Chinese | Pinyin |
|---|---|---|---|---|---|---|
| "Alas That My Lot Was Not Cast" | Zhuang Ji (or, Yan Ji) (Note: attributed) | Ancient | Late BCE - Early AD | Chu ci | 哀時命 | Āi shí mìng |
| "Autumn Day in Kui Prefecture" | Du Fu | Tang poetry | | Complete Tang Poems | 秋日夔府詠懷奉寄鄭監李賓客一百韻 | |
| "Bu Ju" | Uncertain (Note: Traditionally attributed to Qu Yuan) | Ancient | Late BCE - Early AD | Chu ci | 卜居 | Bǔ Jū |
| "Chang Hen Ge" | Bai Juyi | Tang poetry | 806 | | 長恨歌 | Cháng hèn gē |
| "Changsha (poem)" | Mao Zedong | Modern Chinese poetry | 1925 | Various (Note: see Poetry of Mao Zedong) | 長沙 | Chángshā |
| "Chunwang (poem)" | Du Fu | Tang poetry | 757 | Complete Tang Poems, others | 春望 | Chūnwàng |
| "Dandan youqing" (Note: From traditional Tang dynasty and Song dynasty sources) | Teresa Teng (Note: vocalist) | Modern musical recording, based on classical originals | Modern | 1983 | 淡淡幽情 | Dàndàn yōuqíng (Note: literally, "faint deep feelings") |
| "The Double Ninth" | Mao Zedong | Modern Chinese poetry | 1929 | Various (Note: see Poetry of Mao Zedong) | | |
| "Epic of Darkness" | Traditional folk epic, (Note: original author(s) unknown) translated by Hu Chongjun into modern Chinese | Tang dynasty or earlier/Modern Chinese poetry | original dates unknown/translation begun 1982 | | 黑暗傳 | Hēi Àn Zhuàn |
| "Wo Bau-Sae" | Anonymous | Ming dynasty, or later | | | 华抱山 | (Note: Original in Wu Chinese) |
| "Guan ju" | anonymous | Ancient | Seventh century BCE? | Shijing | 關雎 | Guān jū |
| "Heavenly Questions" | Anonymous (Note: Attributed to Qu Yuan, but uncertain, and some parts certainly older.) | Ancient | | Chu Ci | 天問 | Tiānwèn |
| "Ballad of Hua Mulan" | Anonymous | Associated with Music Bureau (Note: Han dynasty, or later, but before Tang) | | (Note: The Ballad of Hua Mulan is recorded as having appeared in the pre-Tang 古今樂錄, but that text is not extant.) | 木蘭辭 | Mùlán cí |
| "Jiu Ge", or Nine Songs (Note: Actually a group of poems, rather than being a particular piece.) | Uncertain | Ancient | | Chu Ci | 九歌 | Jiǔ Gē |
| "Jiu Zhang", or Nine Pieces (Note: Actually a group of poems, rather than being a particular piece.) | Uncertain | Ancient | | Chu Ci | 九章 | |
| "Ju Song", or "In Praise of the Orange-Tree" | Anonymous | Ancient | | Chu Ci (Jiu Zhang section) | 橘頌 | Jú sòng |
| "Lament for Ying", or "Ai Ying" | Uncertain | Ancient | | Chuci | 哀郢 | āi Yǐng |
| "Li Sao" (Note: Sometimes used as name for larger work.) | Qu Yuan | Ancient | | Chu Ci | 離騷 | Lí Sāo |
| "Lion-Eating Poet in the Stone Den" | Yuen Ren Chao | Modern Chinese poetry | | | 施氏食獅史 | Shī Shì shí shī shǐ |
| "Listening to Louis Chen's Zither" | Wong Kwok Pun | Modern Chinese poetry | | | 聽陳蕾士的琴箏 | |
| "Looking up at the Starry Sky" | Wen Jiabao | Modern Chinese poetry | | | 仰望星空 | yǎng wàng xīng kōng |
| "Loushan Pass" | Mao Zedong | Modern Chinese poetry | 1935 | Various (Note: see Poetry of Mao Zedong) | | |
| "Man Jiang Hong" | uncertain (Note: Original tune pattern attributed to Yue Fei.) | Song poetry or subsequent | | | 滿江紅 | Mǎn Jīang Hóng |
| Poetry of Mao Zedong | Mao Zedong (Note: Also known as "Mao Tsetung".) | Modern Chinese poetry (Note: Although in the Modern Chinese poetry period, his works are in the Classical Chinese poetry style.) | mid-20th century | various | | |
| "Nine Changes", or Jiu bian (Note: Actually a group of poems, rather than being a particular piece.) | Uncertain, attributed to Song Yu | Ancient | | Chu Ci | 九辯 | Jiǔ biàn |
| "Nine Laments", or Jiu Tan (Note: Actually a group of poems, rather than being a particular piece.) | Uncertain, attributed to Liu Xiang | Ancient | | Chu Ci | 九歎 | Jiǔ tàn |
| "Nine Longings", or Jiu Si (Note: Actually a group of poems, rather than being a particular piece.) | Wang Yi | Ancient | | Chu Ci | 九思 | Jiǔ sī; |
| "Nine Regrets", or Jiu Huai (Note: Actually a group of poems, rather than being a particular piece.) | Uncertain, attributed to Wang Bao | Ancient | | Chu Ci | 九懷 | Jiǔ huái or Jiǔ Huái |
| "Pipa xing" | Bai Juyi | Tang poetry | 816 | | 琵琶行 | Pípa xíng |
| Poetry of Cao Cao | Cao Cao | Jian'an poetry | | | | |
| "Tiandi yinyang jiaohuan dalefu" | Bai Xingjian | Fu | | | 天地阴阳交欢大乐赋 | Tiāndì yīnyáng jiāohuān dàlèfù |
| "The Quatrain of Seven Steps" | Cao Zhi | Jian'an poetry | | | 七步詩 | Qī Bù Shī |
| "Quiet Night Thought" | Li Bai, also known as "Li Bo" and "Li Po" (Note: "Li Bo" preferred modern Pinyin) | Tang poetry | | Complete Tang Poems, others | 靜夜思 | |
| "Reply to Li Shuyi" | Mao Zedong | Modern Chinese poetry | 1957 | Mao Tsetung Poems | | |
| "Return to the Field" (Note: Zhang Heng's "Return to the Field" is classified as a fu literary work, making it somewhat semi-poetic.) | Zhang Heng | Han poetry | | | 歸田賦 | |
| "Cāntóngqì", or "Sandokai", in Japanese | Shitou Xiqian (Sekitō Kisen) | Tang poetry (Note: Or, Chán) | | | 參同契 | Cāntóngqì |
| "Saying Goodbye to Cambridge Again" | Xu Zhimo | Modern Chinese poetry | 1928 | | 再别康橋 | |
| "Seven Remonstrances", "Seven Admonishments", or Qi Jian (Note: Actually a group of poems, rather than being a particular piece.) | Anonymous (Note: Various theories, in persona of Qu Yuan) | Ancient | (Note: Probably Han poetry) | Chu Ci | 七諫 | Qī jiàn |
| "Shui diao ge" or "Shui diao ge tou" (Note: Tóu (頭) indicates a heading or title, that is that poems with the name (in this case) "Shuǐ diào gē" are based on a Cipai or tone pattern for ci poems with this same name.) | (Note: Cipai tone pattern for ci poems, various known authors wrote their own lyrics to this title/tone pattern, including Su Shi) | | | | 水調歌 | Shuǐ diào gē |
| "Song of the Yue Boatman" | anonymous | | original version attributed to about 528 BC | Garden of Stories (Note: Collected by Liu Xiang. Includes transcription from original language and Chinese language version.) | 越人歌 (Note: Chinese version.) | Yuèrén Gē (Note: Chinese version.) |
| "Sorrow for Troth Betrayed" | Anonymous, with attributions | Ancient | | Chu Ci | 惜誓 | Xī shì |
| "Summons for a Recluse" | Anonymous (Note: Possibly Liu An or his circle.) | Ancient | | Chu Ci | 招隱士 | Zhāo yǐnshì |
| For "Tianwen", see "Heavenly Questions" | | | | | | |
| "The Great Summons" | unknown (Note: Attributed to Qu Yuan and the otherwise relatively unknown Jing Cuo.) | Ancient | | Chu Ci | 大招 | Dà zhāo |
| "Yellow Crane Tower" | Several authors wrote poems under this title | various | | | 黄鹤楼 | Huáng Hè Lóu |
| "Yu Fu", or "The Fisher" | Anonymous, with attributions | Ancient | | Chu Ci | 漁父 | yú fù |
| "Yuan You", or "Far-off Journey (Roaming)" | Anonymous, with attributions | Ancient | | Chu Ci | 遠遊 | Yuǎnyóu |
| "Zhao Hun", or "Summons of the Soul" | Anonymous, with attributions | Ancient | | Chu Ci | 招魂 | Zhāo Hún |
| "Zuiweng Tingji" (Note: Introduction to series of lyrics, some or all set to gu qin.) | Ouyang Xiu (Note: Author of explanatory introduction) | Song poetry | | various | 醉翁亭記 | Zùiwēng Tíng Jì |

== See also ==
=== General ===
- Classical Chinese poetry
- Chinese art
- Shi (poetry) (the Chinese term for poetry)
- Chinese literature
- Chinese classic texts
- List of national poetries
- Modern Chinese poetry
- Category:Chinese translators

=== Poetry of particular (dynastic) periods ===
- Han poetry
- Jian'an poetry
- Six Dynasties poetry
- Tang poetry
- Song poetry

=== Poetry works and collections ===
- Three Hundred Tang Poems
- Classic of Poetry
- Gao Bing
- List of Chuci contents
- List of Classical Chinese poetry anthologies
- List of Three Hundred Tang Poems poets
- "Li Sao"
- New Songs from the Jade Terrace
- Orchid Pavilion Gathering
- Complete Tang Poems
- Sun Zhu
- Wangchuan ji
- Yan Yu (poetry theorist)

=== Individual poets, poems, and translators ===
- List of Chinese language poets
- Poetry of Cao Cao
- Du Fu
- Leung Ping-kwan
- Li Bai
- Poetry of Mao Zedong
- Qu Yuan
- Su Shi
- Wang Wei
- Xu Zhimo

=== Lists of poets ===
- List of Chinese-language poets
- List of Three Hundred Tang Poems poets

=== Important translators of Chinese poetry into English ===
- Archie Barnes
- Witter Bynner
- Herbert Giles
- David Hawkes
- David Hinton
- Bernard Karlgren
- James Legge
- Amy Lowell
- Ezra Pound
- Arthur Waley
- Burton Watson

=== English-language translation collections ===
- Sunflower Splendor: Three Thousand Years of Chinese Poetry

=== Poetic modes, genres, and forms ===
- Ci (poetry)
- Classical Chinese poetry forms
- Classical Chinese poetry genres
- Fu (poetry)
- Jueju
- Pailu
- Qu (poetry)
- Shi
- Yuefu

=== Technical factors of poetry ===
- Classical Chinese poetry
- Classical Chinese poetry forms
- Rime dictionary
- Tone pattern
- Rime table

=== Influence outside of China ===
- Japanese poetry
- Korean poetry
- Vietnamese poetry
- Ernest Fenellosa
- Shigin Shiyin (詩吟)
