= Jiu Zhang =

Collection of ancient chinese poems

Jiu Zhang (Chinese: 九章; pinyin: Jiu Zhang; English: Nine Pieces) is a collection of poems attributed to Qu Yuan and printed in the Chu Ci (楚辭 Songs of Chu, sometimes Songs of the South).

== Title translation ==
Jiu zhang is a transliteration of the title of this section of the Chu ci. Jiu means nine, as in the number. It is not entirely clear why this number was chosen to divide this work into sections, although performance purposes or imitation of prior Chu ci works are both likely factors. Zhang was commonly used in ancient Chinese to mean a section of a literary work, such as a paragraph of a prose piece or for a stanza of a song or poem. Jiu zhang may also be translated into English alternatively, such as Nine Declarations.

== The nine pieces ==
The nine poems of the Jiu Zhang form a diverse collection.

=== Table of contents ===
The "Nine Pieces" consists of nine titles of poems:

Standard order	English translation	Transcription (based on Pinyin)	Traditional Chinese	Simplified Chinese
1	Grieving I Make My Plaint	Xi Song	惜誦	惜诵
2	Crossing the River	She Jiang	涉江	涉江
3	A Lament for Ying	Ai Ying	哀郢	哀郢
4	The Outpouring of Sad Thoughts	Chou Si	抽思	抽思
5	Embracing Sand	Huai Sha	懷沙	怀沙
6	Thinking of a Fair One	Si Meiren	思美人	思美人
7	Alas for the Days Gone By	Xi Wangri	昔往日	昔往日
8	In Praise of the Orange-Tree	Ju Song	橘頌	橘颂
9	Grieving at the Eddying Wind	Bei Hui Feng	悲回風	悲回风

Note that poem numbers 1, 6, 7, and 9 actually lack titles in the original text; rather, they are named for the sake of convenience after the first few words with which these poems begin. English titles based on David Hawkes' translations.

== See also ==
- Chu ci
- List of Chuci contents
- Liu An
- Liu Xiang (scholar)
- Qu Yuan
- Song Yu
- Wang Yi (librarian)
