= The Legend of Huainanzi =

Chinese television series

The Legend of Huainanzi (originally titled 淮南子传奇) is a TV animation series produced by CCTV Animation Co. LTD, Huainan Media Industry Development Centre and Communication University of China. This 52-episode epic-historical-fantasy series is based on Chinese philosophical classic Huainanzi and is broadcast by CCTV-Children.

== Synopsis ==
During the ancient Western Han dynasty (206BC-9AD), a series of disasters caused by occult phenomena swept across the entire world. Huainanzi, the mysterious Chinese book bound in bamboo, was ripped apart and sent through time to different historical junctures. The book pieces were transformed into various objects, waiting to be rediscovered.

A hundred years later, a young man, named Hong Lie lifts up the burden to collect the missing pieces of the ancient bamboo book. With the help of Ba Gong and his friends, going through the Gate of 24 Solar Terms, Hong Lie travels through dynasties to search for the lost pieces.

In his adventure, Hong Lie and his loyal friends, Ji Ming and Gou Tiao, together experienced the greatness of the ancient legends, appreciating the wisdom of the ancestors from Chun Qiu Period, and witnessed all the weird things happening among ordinary people. Warmth and coldness, sadness and happiness, separation and reunion, stories led him to the great world in the book Huainanzi and through exciting adventures he made lifelong friends. In this special way, Hong Lie communicated with ancestors and started to see the principle of world, realizing that obeying the laws of nature and being in harmony with the environment was the right thing to do. A simple collecting journey slowly became a challenging trip for him to go on with his family mission, and inherit the ancestor's spirit.

== Main Character ==
Hong Lie

A 12-year-old naughty boy, with a direct and straight character, he is a big fan of playing tricks, but inside him is kind and faithful soul. He has a strong sense of justice, when unfair things occur, he would definitely fight against them. As long as he made up his mind on something, no one or nothing could ever stop him. Since he never cares for the consequences, most goodies would be turned into disasters because of him, and often the situation would fall out of control.

Li Qi

A 15-year-old pretty girl, innocent and romantic, she is the real first-chair in the family, doing all the chores and maintaining the daily order. She also needs to take care of Ba Gong and educate her younger brother. She is always gentle and nice to other people, however when it comes to her naughty brother Hong Lie, she would go crazy, and of course, two of them are always fighting.

Ba Gong

He is a weird old man of over an hundred years old, moody and unpredictable, he is always absorbed in his own thoughts. He loves to play small tricks, and doing unexpected things, people are already used to his craziness.

He never seems to worry about Hong Lie or Li Qi at all, he lets them do whatever they want, and treats them like friends. He believes that everyone has their own destiny and as long as one can enjoy his life, that's fine. However, if anything relates to the bamboo book happens, he would take it very serious and suddenly become another man.

Ji Ming

He was once a fighting rooster of the royal court, then went to heaven with Liu An and was known as the Vermilion Bird. However, after that he got banished to the man's world and ever since then he became an ordinary rooster. He can't stand the mocking of fate and swears to go back to heaven. Therefore, he's always so eager about travelling back through time, and for this reason, he is sometimes way too utilitarian and selfish. He's quite clever, and the thing he hates the most is being treated as an ordinary rooster.

Gou Tiao

He loves to sleep, loves to droll, and rarely talks, but when he starts to say something in that fairly slow speed, those simple words always reveals the reality and the truth. Usually he seems to be lazy and casual, nothing could ever surprise him. However, when trapped in dangerous situations, he would become ferocious in a second and get ready to fight. Once the alert canceled, he would go back to that sleepy face again. In addition, his loyalty to Hong Lie cannot be doubted.
