= Dongfang Shuo =

Han dynasty scholar-official

- 東方朔
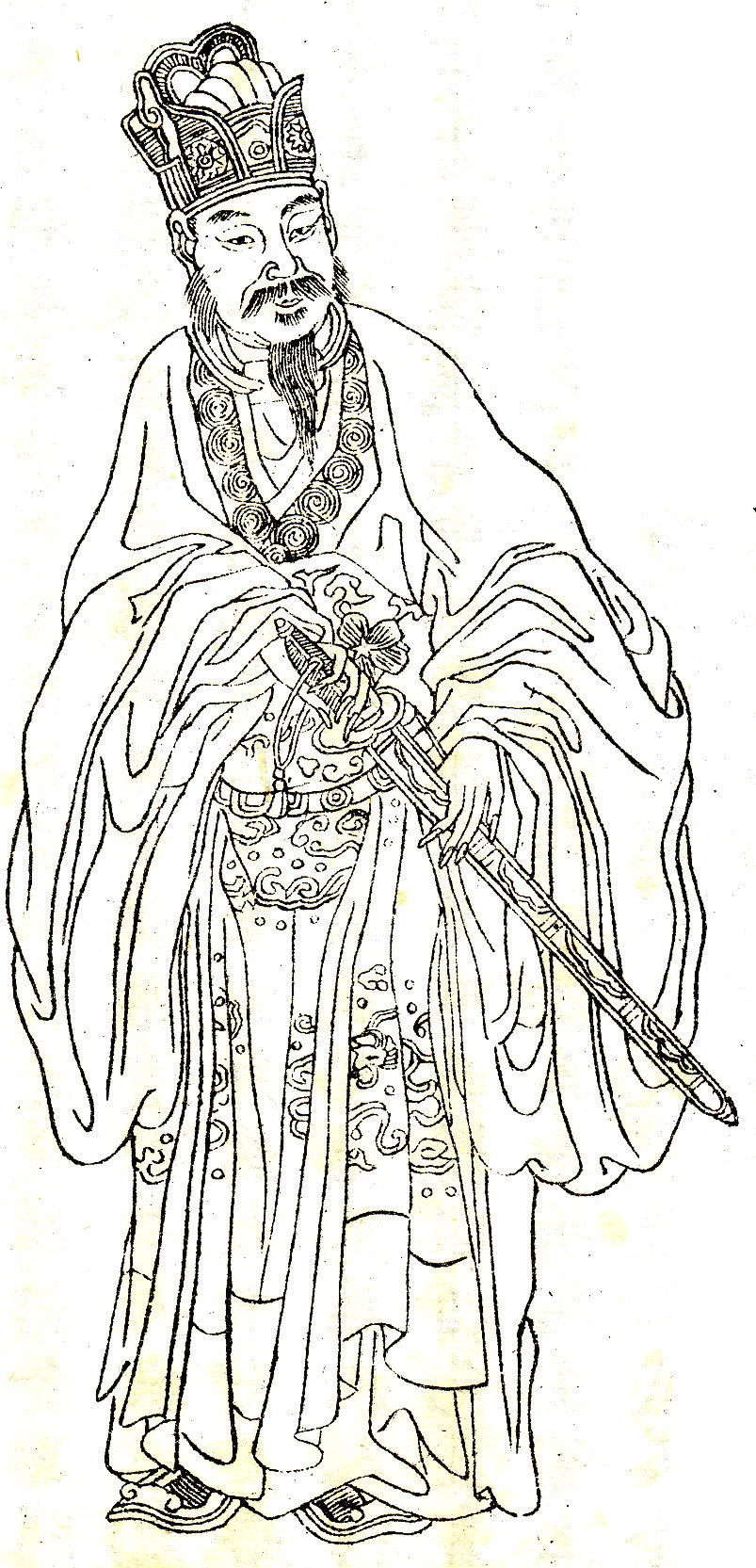

Personal details
- Born: Zhang Shuo c. 160 BCE Yanci County, Pingyuan Commandery, Western Han dynasty (now Huimin County, Shandong)
- Died: c. 93 BCE
- Occupation: Scholar-official, fangshi, writer and jester

Dongfang Shuo
- Traditional Chinese: 東方朔
- Simplified Chinese: 东方朔
Transcriptions
Standard Mandarin
- Hanyu Pinyin: Dōngfāng Shuò
- Wade–Giles: Tung^{1}-fang^{1} Shuo^{4}
- IPA: [tʊ́ŋfáŋ ʂwô]
Yue: Cantonese
- Yale Romanization: Dūng-fōng Sok
- Jyutping: Dung^{1}-fong^{1} Sok^{3}
Southern Min
- Tâi-lô: Tang-hong Sok

Dongfang Shuo (Chinese: 東方朔, c. 160 BCE – c. 93 BCE) was a Han dynasty scholar-official, fangshi ("master of esoterica"), author, and court jester to Emperor Wu (r. 141 – 87 BCE). In Chinese mythology, Dongfang is considered a Daoist xian ("transcendent; immortal") and the spirit of Venus who incarnated as a series of ancient ministers including Laozi. Dongfang Shuo is depicted in the Wu Shuang Pu (無雙譜, Table of Peerless Heroes) by Jin Guliang.

== Names ==
Dongfang Shuo's original Chinese surname was Zhang (張 meaning "stretch; spread"), which was later changed to an uncommon compound surname Dongfang (東方 "eastern direction; the east"). His Chinese given name was Shuo (朔 "new moon") and his courtesy name was Manqian (曼倩 "graceful handsome").

Owing to his eccentric and humorous behavior at the Han court in Chang'an, Dongfang was regarded as a court jester (Huaji 滑稽, "Buffoon") and he proclaimed himself the first chaoyin (朝隱 "recluse at court", punning yinshi 隱士 "recluse scholar; hermit"). When fellow courtiers called him crazy, Dongfang replied, "People like me are known as those who escape the world by taking it easy at court."

== History ==
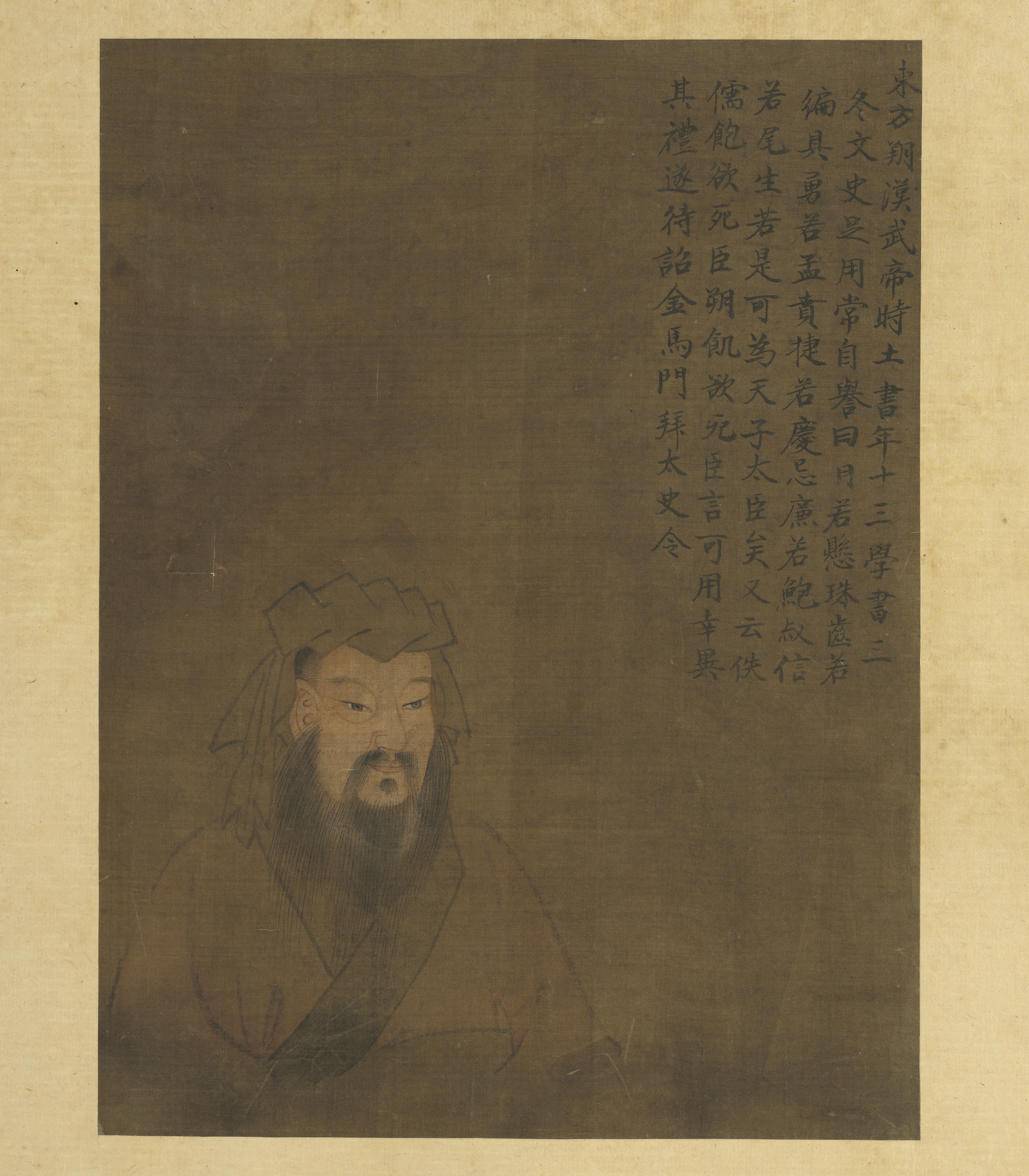
Portrait of Dongfang Shuo (National Palace Museum)

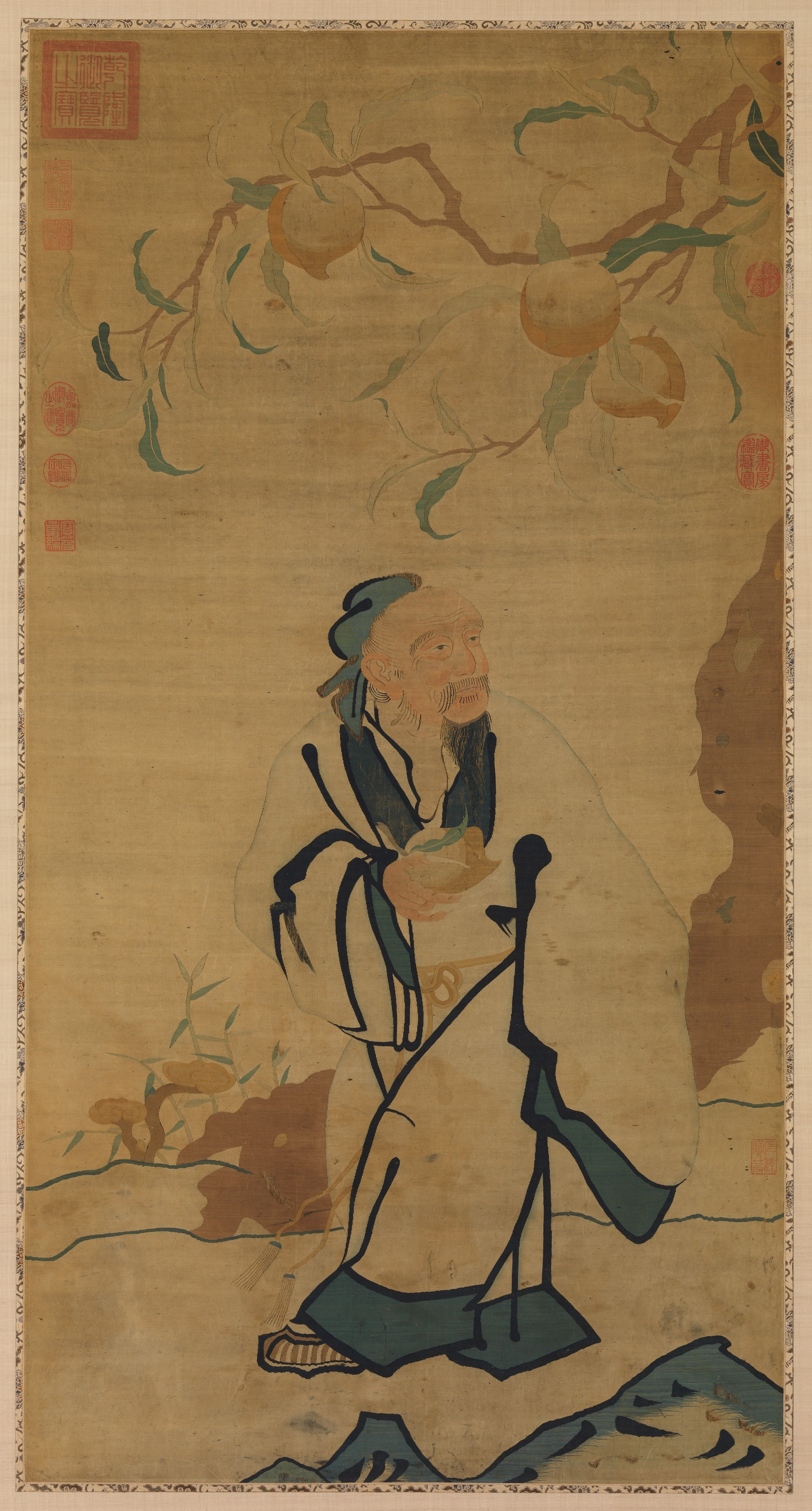
Silk tapestry of Dongfang Shuo stealing a peach of immortality, Ming dynasty (Metropolitan Museum of Art)

The primary historical sources for Dongfang Shuo are biographies in the early Chinese dynastic Twenty-Four Histories. The (91 BCE) Records of the Grand Historian includes him under the "Biographies of Jesters" chapter (126, 滑稽列傳), which was appended by Chu Shaosun (褚少孫, c. 105 – c. 30 BCE). The (111 CE) Book of Han gives him a full "Biography of Dongfang Shuo" chapter (65, 東方朔傳).

Dongfang Shuo was a native of Yanci (厭次) in Pingyuan (平原), present-day Ling County in Shandong, where his tomb and a shrine are located.

The Book of Han biography of Dongfang Shuo characterizes him as "rich in words, a man of jests and witticisms, an actor and a buffoon."

In 138 BCE, Emperor Wu called for recommendations of individuals who were "honest and upright, worthy and good, or noted for scholarly or literary talents or unusual strength", offering to assign them official posts. While "thousands came forward to peddle and parade their abilities", Dongfang submitted the following self-description to the throne.

When I was young, I lost my father and mother and was brought up by my older brother and his wife. At the age of twelve I began to study writing, and after three winters I knew enough to handle ordinary texts and records. At fifteen I studied fencing; at sixteen, the Songs and History; and soon I had memorized 220,000 words. At nineteen I studied the works on military science by Masters Sun and Wu, the equipment pertaining to battle and encampment, and the regulations concerning drum and gong. Once more I memorized 220,000 words, so that in all I could recite 440,000 words. In addition I always kept in mind Zilu's words. I am twenty-two years in age, measuring nine feet three inches [the chi "Chinese foot" was about 24 cm.], have eyes like pendant pearls, teeth like ranged shells, and am as brave as Meng Ben, nimble as Qingji, scrupulous as Bao Zhu, and loyal as Wei Sheng. I am fit to become a great minister to the Son of Heaven. Daring death, I bow twice and submit this report.

Based on these egregiously conceited words, the emperor concluded that Dongfang Shuo was extraordinary and "ordered him to await the imperial command in the office of public carriage."

Dongfang was impatient for an imperial audience and devised a scheme that involved frightening the court dwarfs who worked in the stable. He told them the emperor was going to have them killed because they could not do the work of ordinary men, and suggested that the next time Wu passed by, they should kowtow and beg for mercy.

After a while, word came that the emperor was on his way. The dwarfs all wailed and bowed their heads, and when the emperor asked them why they were doing that, they relied, "Dongfang Shuo told us Your Majesty was going to have us all executed!" The emperor, knowing that Shuo was a man of many devices, summoned him and asked him what he meant by terrifying the dwarfs in this fashion. Shuo replied, "I will speak out, whether it means life or death for me! The dwarfs are somewhat over three feet in height, and as a stipend they receive one sack of grain and 240 cash each. I am somewhat over nine feet in height, and as a stipend I too receive one sack of grain and 240 cash. The dwarfs are about to die from overeating, I am about to die of hunger. If my words are of any use, I hope I may be treated differently from them. If my words are of no use, then dismiss me. There's no point in merely keeping me around to eat up the rice of Chang'an!" The emperor roared with laughter and accordingly assigned him to await command at the Golden Horse Gate. Little by little, Shuo gained the confidence of the emperor.

Humor is also recorded in a third Book of Han example. On a hot summer day, Emperor Wu ordered a gift of meat be given to his attendants, but the imperial butler was slow to distribute them. Dongfang drew his sword, cut off a piece of meat, put it into the breast of his robe, and said to his fellow officials, "In these hot days one ought to go home early. With your permission, therefore, I will take my gift." On the next day at court, Dongfang Shuo apologized for his violation of etiquette to the emperor, who commanded, "Stand up, sir, and confess your faults."

Shuo bowed twice and said. "All right now, Shuo! You accepted the gift without waiting for the imperial command – what a breach of etiquette! You drew your sword and cut the meat – what singular daring! When you carved it up, you didn't take much – how abstemious of you! You took it home and gave it to the little lady – how big-hearted!" The emperor laughed and said, "I told you to confess your faults and here you are praising yourself!" Then he presented him with a further gift of a gallon of wine and a hundred catties of meat and told him to take them home to "the little lady."

== Writings ==
Dongfang Shuo wrote various texts, essays, and poems; other writings attributed to him are doubted by textual scholars.

According to the Book of Han biography of Dongfang,. his two finest writings are the Da ke nan (答客難 "Replies to a Guest's Objections", oldest example of the shelun 設論 "hypothetical discourse" literary form), and Feiyou xiansheng lun (非有先生論 "An Essay by Elder Nobody". It further states that Book of Han bibliography (chapter 30, 藝文志 "Treatise on Literature") lists all of Dongfang's genuine writings, "but the other pieces that are passed around these days are completely spurious". An example of the latter is the Qijian (七諫 "Seven Admonishments") poem in the Chuci, which Wang Yi's (2nd century) commentary attributes to Dongfang. David Hawkes concludes, "Nothing that we know about Dong-fang Shuo leads us to suppose he … is likely to have been a writer in the poetry of Chu style".

Two early texts are traditionally attributed to Dongfang Shuo. The (c. late 2nd century) Shenyi jing (神異經 "Classic on Divine Marvels"), with a commentary by Zhang Hua (232–300), is a geographically arranged collection of wonders and marvels. The (c. 300) Shizhou ji (十洲記 "Records of the Ten Continents") is a long speech by Dongfang to Emperor Wu on mythical geography, in which "this fangshi-adviser describes the outlying terrestrial paradises on each of the Ten Continents, four islands, and two mountains".

== Legends ==
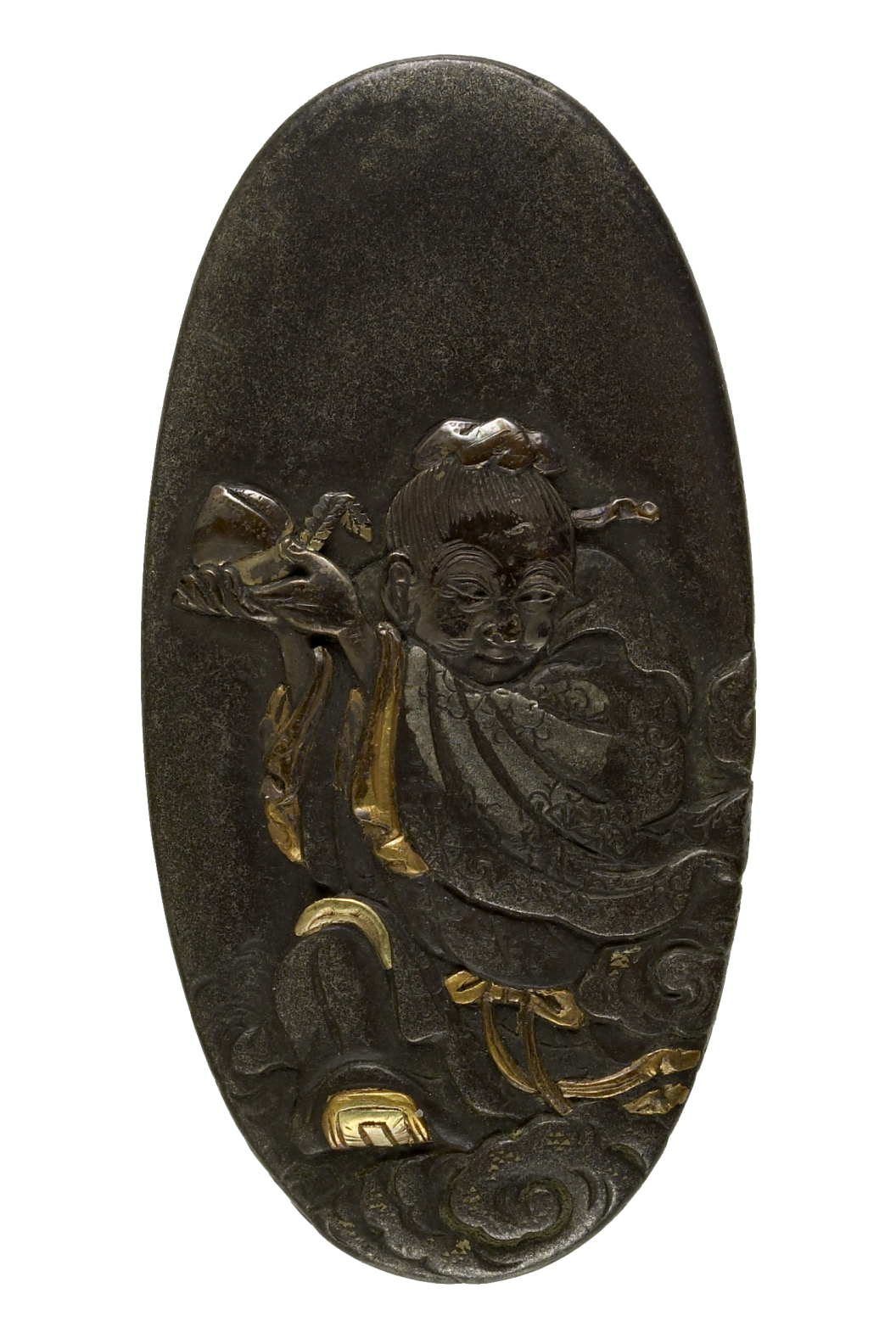
Kashira with Dongfang Shuo holding a peach

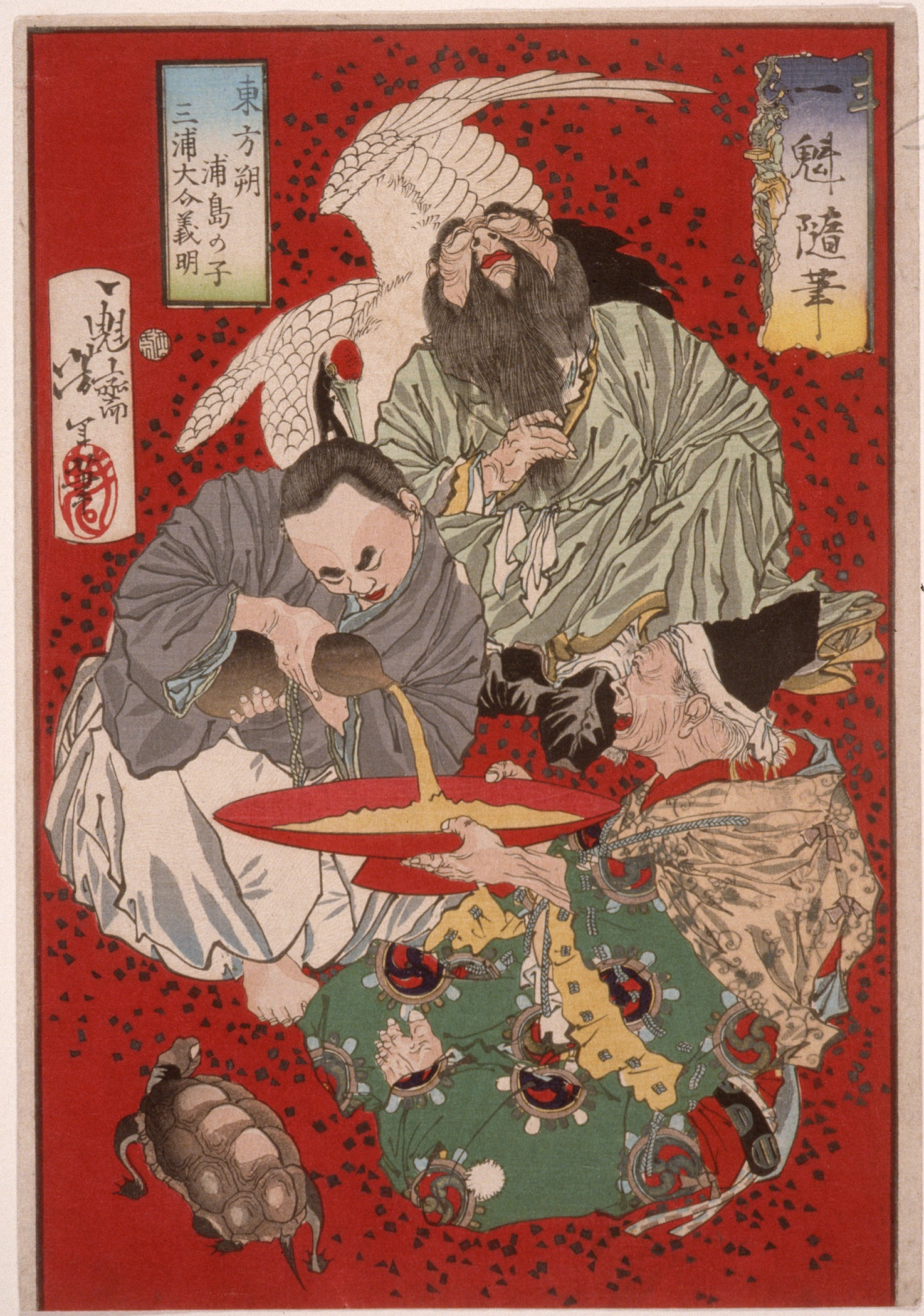
Tsukioka Yoshitoshi's "Tobosaku(Dongfang Shuo), Miura Daisuke Yoshiaki, and the Son of Urashima"

During his lifetime, Dongfang Shuo was considered a zhexian (謫仙 "banished immortal"). In the Six dynasties period (222–589 CE), Dongfang Shuo became the hero of many legends and stories. He was supposedly an embodiment of Sui (歲 "Jupiter") or Taibai (太白 "Venus"), had a miraculous birth, possessed supernatural powers, and went through numerous reincarnations, including Laozi and Fan Li.

Liu Xiang's (c. 77-6 BCE) Liexian Zhuan ("Biographies of Exemplary Transcendents") has an early description of Dongfang Shuo. By the time of Emperor Zhao of Han (r. 87 – 74 BCE), "some people thought he was a sage; others found him ordinary. His behavior varied between depth and shallowness, brazenness and withdrawal. At times his words were full of loyalty, then again he made jokes. Nobody could figure him out." At beginning of Emperor Xuan of Han's reign (91 BCE), Dongfang resigned from his position, left his official residence, and went "drifting off to wherever chance might take him. … Among wise men some suspected that he was really an incarnation of the essence of the planet Jupiter."

The (c. 195 CE) Fengsu tongyi ("Comprehensive Accounts of Popular Customs"), which repeats Dongfang's conceited self-recommendation, says he was "commonly said to be the spirit of the planet Venus, and to have passed through a number of incarnations." When Dongfang was a court official, "he kept a troupe of singers and actors, and did not concern himself with State business. [Liu Xiang] in his youth often questioned him about the prolongation of life, and found him full of shrewdness and insight. His own contemporaries all describe him as the prince of good fellows, and irresistible in argument."

Both the (c. 3rd century) Han Wudi gushi ("Precedents of Han Emperor Wu") and Buowuzhi ("Monograph on Various Matters") record a myth about Xi Wangmu ("Queen Mother of the West") presenting the "peaches of immortality" to Han Emperor Wu. She brought seven peaches, "each only the size of a pill, five of which she presented to the Emperor, and ate the other two herself." The Queen Mother recognized Dongfang as a courtier of hers at Mount Kunlun and told the Emperor he was "an incarnation of the planet Jupiter who has been temporarily banished to earth for stealing her peaches of immortality".

The (c. 335–349) Soushenji ("Records of an Inquest into the Sacred") tells a story about Emperor Wu encountering a monster blocking Hangu Pass, "Thirty or forty feet in length, its body resembled in shape that of a buffalo or an elephant. It had black eyes that blazed with light, and its four legs were so firmly planted in the ground that every effort to dislodge it was unavailing." All the courtiers were terrified except for Dongfang Shuo, who sprinkled gallons of wine over the monster, which gradually melted away. He explained to the emperor, "This may be called the product of an atmosphere of sorrow and suffering," the site of either a Qin dynasty dungeon or corvée labor by criminals. "Now, wine has the power to banish grief, and that is why it was able to dispel this phantom." The emperor exclaimed, "Oh, man of much learning, to think that your knowledge can extend as far as this!"

The (c. 6th century) Han Wudi neizhuan ("Outer Biography of Emperor Wu") tells of Dongfang leaving the world in a typically xian fashion. A number of people observed him mount a dragon and fly northwest up into the sky until "he was enveloped in a dense mist which made it impossible to see where he went."
