= Summons for a Recluse =

"Summons for a Recluse" (traditional Chinese: 招隱士; simplified Chinese: 招隐士; pinyin: Zhāo yǐnshì; lit. 'Summons for a Recluse') is one of the 17 major sections of the ancient Chinese poetry collection Chu ci, also known as The Songs of the South or The Songs of Chu. The "Summons for a Recluse" is a short but influential poem (Hawkes, 2011 [1985]: 244). The actual poet is not known; but, Liu An or an associate are likely as authors (Hawkes, 2011 [1985]: 243).

== See also ==
- Chu ci
- List of Chuci contents
- Liu An
- Liu Xiang (scholar)
- Qu Yuan
- Song Yu
- Wang Yi (librarian)

=== Sources ===
- 招隱士
