= Boyi and Shuqi =

11th-century BC brothers in ancient China

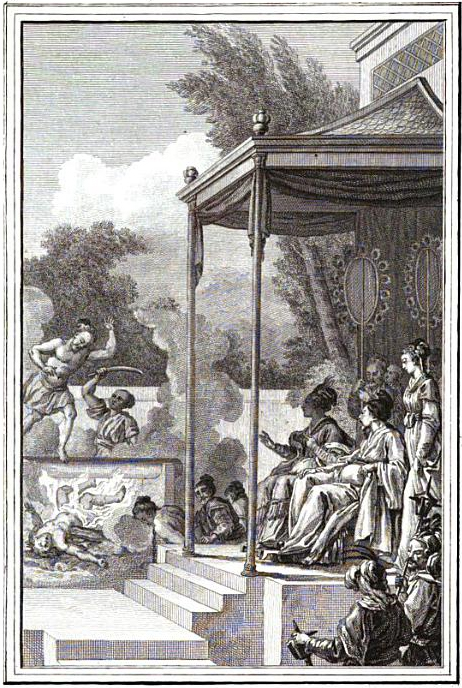
Di Xin (King Zhou) of the Shang dynasty accompanied by consort Daji, in the midst of their abominable acts. Nevertheless, Boyi and Shuqi indirectly swore loyalty to the dynasty after they fled their land of birth.

Boyi (Chinese: 伯夷; pinyin: Bó Yí, lit. 'Eldest Brother Even') and Shuqi (Chinese: 叔齊; pinyin: Shū Qí, lit. 'Third Brother Equal') were two Dongyi brothers from Guzhu (modern Hebei province, near Tangshan), a Dongyi vassal state under the Shang dynasty. According to tradition, they lived at the time of the transition between the Shang dynasty and the Zhou dynasty (approximately 1046 BCE). They are remembered in literary culture for their personal and moral virtue, loyalty, and pacifist idealism. Sometimes they are referred to together just as "Boyi", after the elder brother.

Boyi and Shuqi represent some paradoxes in ethics: Boyi refused to take over rule of his father's kingdom because he felt his father preferred his younger brother and going against his father's wishes would not be in accord with filial piety. Shuqi refused the rule because it would be unfilial to allow his older brother to be bypassed. So the two fled together. Then, after the overthrow of the Shang dynasty to which they had pledged loyalty (and which theoretically owned the land and its produce by divine right), the two brothers faced the dilemma of disloyalty in eating the food of the new (in their opinion, usurping) dynasty or remaining loyal in spirit to the former dynasty. Thus the two were left with starvation as the final option.

== Background ==
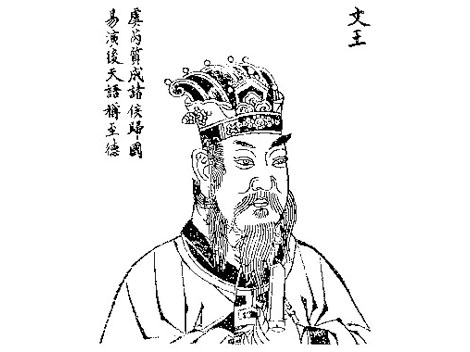
Depiction of King Wen of Zhou, originally a vassal of the Shang dynasty to whose territory Boyi and Shuqi fled after hearing reports of his able governance

Boyi and Shuqi lived during the reign of the last Shang ruler Di Xin, who at this point had become given over to drinking, women, sex, and a disdain for morals. His country was misruled, with high taxes, mass hunger, and arbitrary acts of violence and cruelty. Sima Qian provides lurid details of prolonged orgies of drunken sex and acts of violence and torture, during which he refused to heed the advice of his ministers. At the same time the leader of the Zhou clan, posthumously known as King Wen of Zhou, was preparing to replace the Shang dynasty with the rule of his own clan (the subsequent Zhou dynasty), though at the time they were a vassal state to Shang. In contrast to Shang, the leadership of Zhou was famous for its provision of food and protection for its subjects, in part due to their advances in agricultural techniques.

== Biography ==
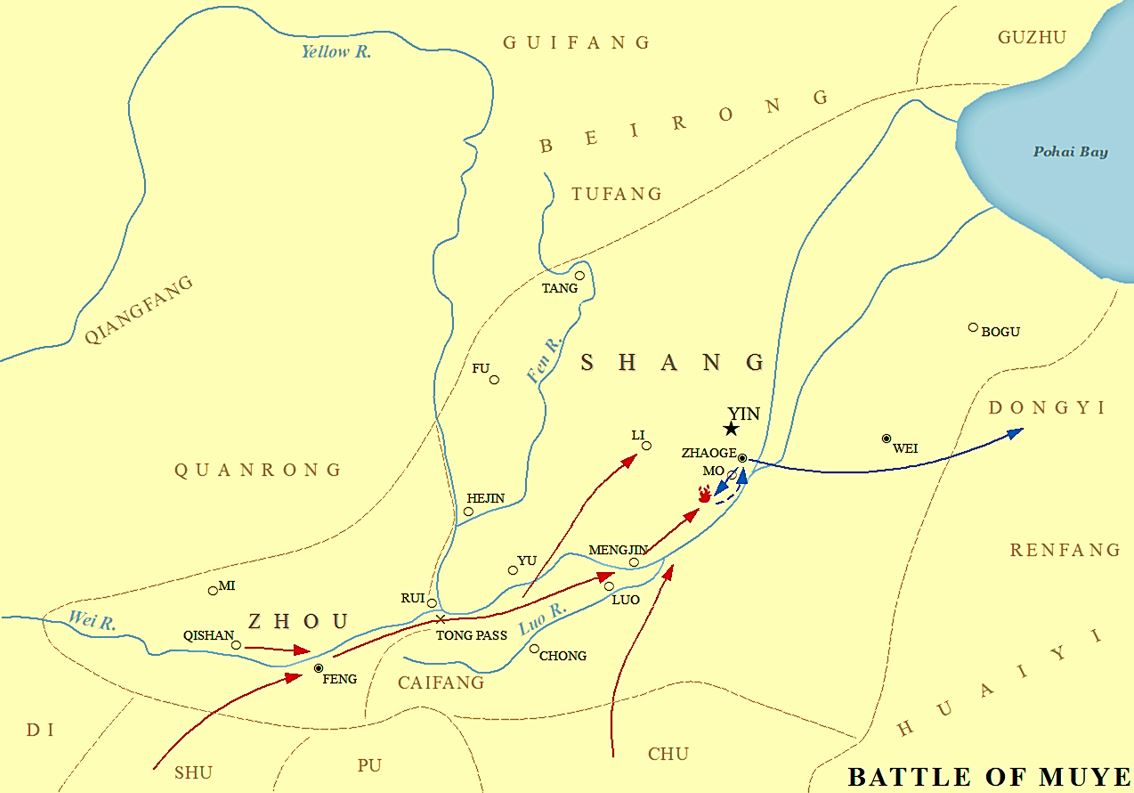
Map of the location of the Battle of Muye, where the rising Zhou dynasty defeated the incumbent Shang dynasty

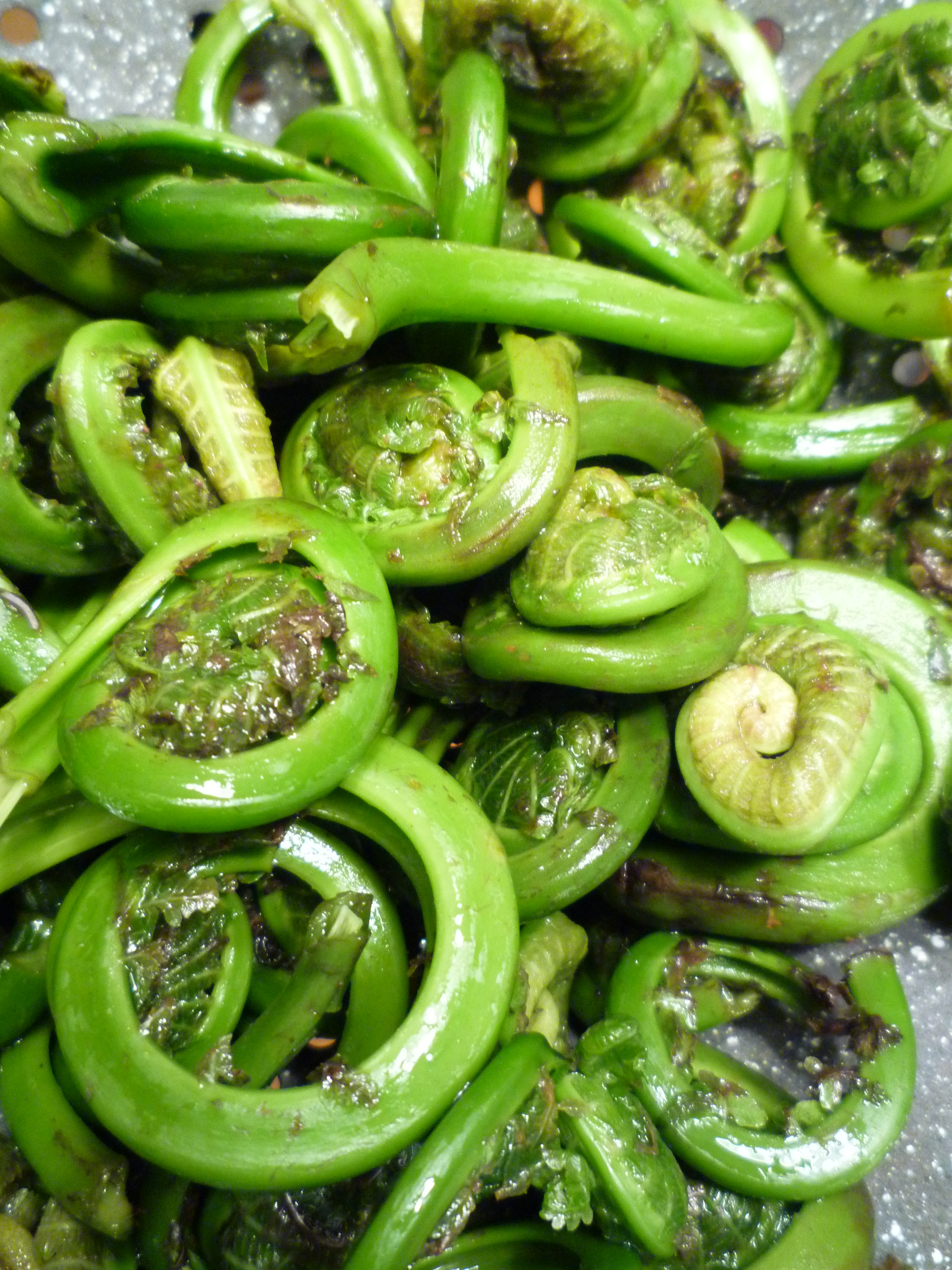
Fiddlehead ferns, said to be Boyi and Shuqi's diet in exile, shown newly picked and washed. They are generally considered to be toxic before cooking.

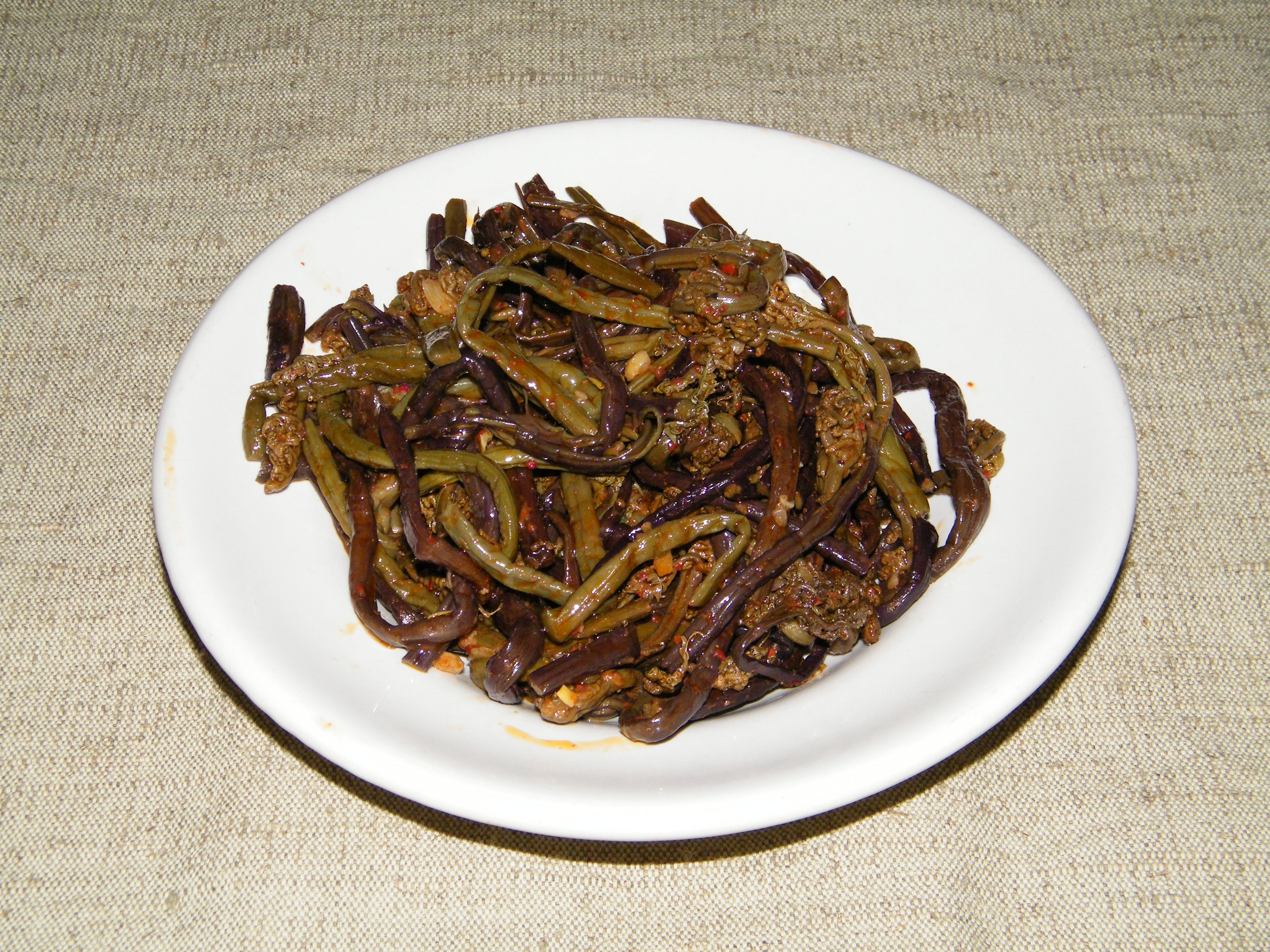
Fiddlehead ferns, prepared dish.

Boyi and Shuqi, together with another brother Yà Píng (亞憑/亚凭; lit. "Junior Brother Leaning"), were the sons of Ya Wei (亞微/亚微, lit. "Junior Brother Wei"), the Ruling Lord of the Guzhu state (lit. "Lone Bamboo" kingdom). Traditionally, the succession to the rulership would have gone to the elder son, namely Boyi; but, when Shuqi was preferred to succeed him as ruler, rather than engaging in conflict or disharmonious relationships, together they fled to the Zhou territory; which, at the time was actively encouraging immigration, particularly of skilled and talented persons.

The moral sensitivities of Boyi and Shuqi were such that they would not abide by the violence and horror then rampant in the directly ruled part of Shang territory due to the misrule of emperor Di Xin. At first, the two brothers were welcomed by the Zhou, who held a vassal kingdom to the West of the main Shang territory. However, the ruler of the Zhou, Wen, died and his son Ji Fa, later known as king Wu, upon succeeding him as ruler, immediately proceeded to marshal his forces and lead them to conquer Shang: the brothers attempted to change the course of history by pulling on the chariot reins of the ruler, Ji Fa (Wu), remonstrating with him for his lack of filial piety, both because rather than sufficiently mourning his recently deceased father he was going off to war and also that he was betraying his sacred allegiance to his sovereign lord, Di Xin, the ruler of the Shang. Wu's outraged guards would have killed the brothers, except for the intervention of general Jiang Taigong, who recognized the sincerity of their moral convictions. But, instead of heeding their protests, the army continued on its way to eventual victory over the Shang, in the extremely violent slaughter known as the Battle of Muye.

Boyi and Shuqi made their protest widely known through their refusal to eat the produce of Zhou, the traditional and very culturally significant "Five Grains", saying: "King Wu, as a minister who assassinated his king, is an disloyal and unrighteous man. We cannot work as ministers for an emperor lacking in loyalty, righteousness, and virtue. We are ashamed to have accepted an emolument from him." They retired to the wilderness of Shouyang Mountain (首陽山), in modern Yongji, Shanxi, also called "West Mountain", and lived on fiddlehead ferns, until they were reminded that these plants too now belonged to Zhou, at which point they starved themselves to death. According to a version, which appears in the Heavenly Questions, the brothers were eventually warned not to eat the ferns by a maiden (or other unidentified woman), after which a white deer miraculously appeared, suckling them, nurturing them with her milk, and thus preventing immediate starvation; however, all known versions of the story end with the demise of Boyi and Shuqi, by starvation.

== Legacy ==
During the Song dynasty, in 1102, Boyi and Shuqi were both posthumously awarded the rank of marquis.

Boyi and Shuqi have had a long legacy both in philosophy and literature and in art and poetry.

=== Philosophy and literature ===
Boyi and Shuqi's life and their choices became a mainstay of Chinese philosophy and literature. They raise the question of why did they choose to give up fortune, power, and riches, and whether they would have regretted their choices near the end of their lives. Their starvation in the story, whilst various evildoers thrive, seems to contradict the common belief that Heaven rewards good and punishes evil.

==== Confucius ====
When the famous philosopher Confucius was asked whether Boyi and Shuqi felt wronged for starving to death in the western mountains, Confucius answered by saying: "They pursued the perfection of humaneness, and they achieved it. Why should they feel wronged?"

==== Sima Qian ====
The historian Sima Qian included various biographical sketches in his Records of the Grand Historian, including the "A Biographical Sketch of Boyi", which includes Shuqi. In this, he incorporates discussion of morality and Heaven from the perspective of Lao Zi. Sima addresses the question of whether there are consequences for choosing good or evil, by comparing Boyi with the robber Zhi (盜), who was said to have lived to a ripe old age feeding on human flesh, among other heinous deeds.

=== Art and poetry ===
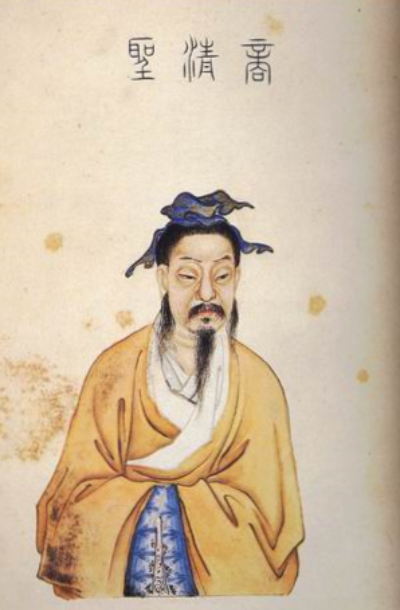
Qing dynasty illustration of Bo Yi.

Boyi and Shuqi have been used as artistic references in painting, poetry, and literature, including a surviving painting by Li Tang and references in poems by Du Fu, and others. The Chuci anthology's Qi jian's second piece ("Drowning in the River") references Bo Yi and Shuqi with extravagant praise: in this case, metrical considerations have led to an artificial apparent separation between the brothers, with Boyi in line 29 being described as starving himself on Shouyangshan and in line 30 Shuqi described as having (thus) won eternally-spreading glory. In literature Boyi and Shuqi are also referred to as Yi-Shu, that is, Yi and Shu. For example, in lines of the second of the "Drinking Songs" series by Tao Yuanming (using poetic antithesis):

It is said that accumulated good brings a reward.
Yi and Shu starved at West Mountain.

("積善云有報 夷叔在西山")

== See also ==
- Baimei Shen
- Confucius
- History of China
- Houji
- Ju Song
- List of people who died of starvation
- Sima Qian
- Yanshi
