= Liu Ling (Han dynasty) =

Liu Ling (劉陵) (died 122 BC or earlier) was a Han dynasty princess during Emperor Wu's reign. She was the daughter of Liu An, the King of Huainan, as well as a second cousin of Emperor Wu.

Liu An sent her to the national capital Chang'an to become a socialite, so as to spy on Emperor Wu and his ministers. After Liu An was accused of staging a rebellion, his entire clan was apprehended and executed, Liu Ling presumably among them (unless she died before that).

== Biography ==
Liu Ling probably grew up in her father Liu An's territory of Huainan, a large area south of the Huai River. She was said to be intelligent and articulate. Her father was fond of her, and sent her to Chang'an with a lot of "gold and money" to "befriend" and "spy on" the Emperor and those to his "left and right". She bribed and had an illicit sexual relationship with at least one person: Zhang Cigong (張次公), the Marquess of Antou (岸頭侯), who lost his title and territory when the scandal was exposed in 122 BC, the year Liu An and Liu Ling were executed.

According to official history, Liu An plotted to rebel, while his wife Tu (荼), son Liu Qian (劉遷), and daughter Liu Ling were all profligate and oppressive: they robbed commoners of their farmland and houses, and sentenced people on wanton charges. In 122 BC, Emperor Wu discovered Liu An's plot and called for his arrest: Liu An committed suicide, while thousands of people including his entire clan were executed.

== Notes and references ==
- Ban Gu; et al. Han Shu 漢書 [Book of Han] (in Chinese).
