= Eight Gentlemen of Huainan =

The Eight Gentlemen of Huainan (Chinese: 淮南八公; pinyin: Huáinán bāgōng) were the eight scholars under the patronage of Liu An (劉安 Liú Ān), the prince of Huainan during the Western Han dynasty. Together, they wrote the philosophical collection Huainanzi (淮南子, Huáinánzǐ, literally "The Philosophers of Huainan").

They were:

- Jin Chang (晋昌 Jìn Chāng),
- Lei Bei (雷被 Léi Bèi),
- Li Shang (李尚 Lǐ Shàng),
- Mao Bei (毛被 Máo Bèi),
- Su Fei (苏飞 Sū Fēi),
- Tian You (田由 Tián Yóu),
- Wu Bei (伍被 Wǔ Bèi), and
- Zuo Wu (左吴 Zuǒ Wú).

The "Bagong Mountain" ("Eight Gentlemen Mountain") in China is named after them.
