= Huainan Kingdom =

Kingdom of China's Han dynasty

- Chinese: 淮南國
- Literal meaning: Kingdom south of the Huai
Transcriptions
Standard Mandarin
- Hanyu Pinyin: Huáinánguó
- Wade–Giles: Huai-nan Kuo

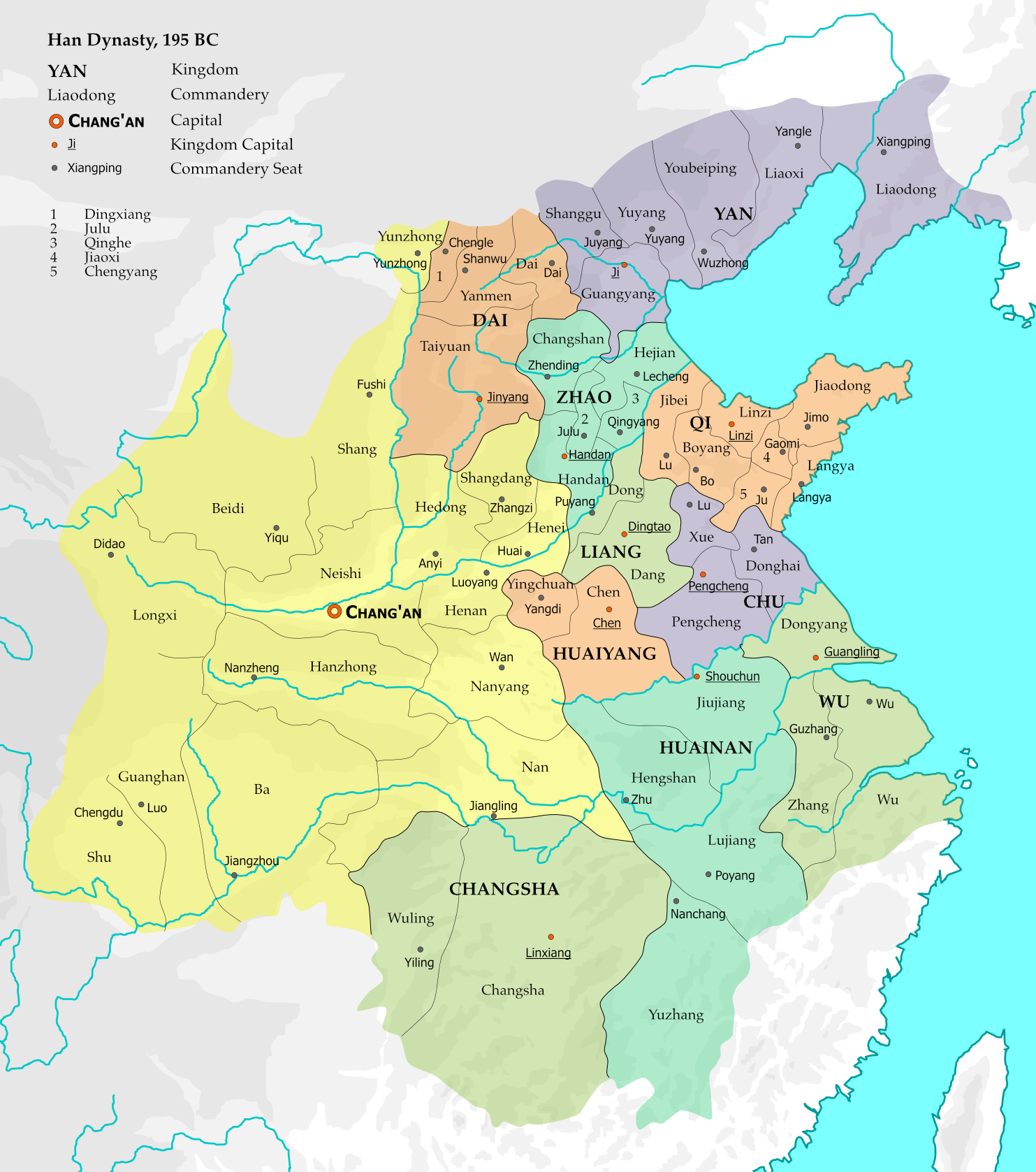
Kingdoms of the Han dynasty in 195 BC

Huainan Kingdom (Note: The title 王 previously and now usually means "king" but was equivalent to and usually translated as "prince" during China's imperial period.) was a kingdom of China's Han dynasty, located in what is now parts of Anhui, Jiangxi and Hubei provinces.

== History ==
The title "King (or Prince) of Huainan" was first created in 202 BC by Liu Bang, King of Han, for Ying Bu, the former king of Jiujiang. After Liu Bang became the first emperor of the Han, Ying Bu rose up against Liu Bang in 196 BC. He was defeated and killed by Liu Bang.

After Liu Bang killed Ying Bu, he conferred the title of king of Huainan on his youngest son Liu Chang.

In 164 BC, Huainan was divided among Liu Chang's three sons. The eldest son Liu An kept the title King of Huainan, while his brothers became Kings of Hengshan (衡山王) and Lujiang (廬江王), respectively.

Liu An, engaged in political and cosmological arguments with Dong Zhongshu, founded an academy which compiled the Huainanzi. The Huainanzi leaves room for multiple cultural traditions in China through the concept of the Tao. By contrast, Dong advocated cultural centralization, placing Heaven and its mandate before all other concepts. Wang Aihe views the defeat of the Prince of Huainan as symbolic of China's increasing cultural centralization during the Han dynasty.

In 122 BC, Liu An was involved in an alleged plot of rebellion, and committed suicide. The kingdom was converted to Jiujiang Commandery, while the title King of Huainan became extinct.

== Kings of Huainan ==
1. Ying Bu (英布, 202–196 BC)
2. Liu Chang (劉長, 196–174 BC)
3. Liu Xi (劉喜, 169–165 BC)
4. Liu An (劉安, 164–122 BC)

== See also ==
- Prince of Wu
- Timeline of the Chu–Han Contention
