= Nine Longings =

Nine Longings (Chinese: 九思; pinyin: Jiǔ sī; lit. 'Nine Longings') form one of the 17 major sections of the ancient Chinese poetry collection, the Chu ci. The "Nine Longings" consists of ten poems (or, nine plus luan envoi), each individually titled, written according to the style of the earlier pieces in the Chu ci anthology. It is one of the several collections of poems grouped under the title of "Nine" something-or-others, most but not all of which consist of 9 pieces of poetry. One of the older of them, Jiu ge ("Nine Songs") consists of 11 individual pieces: "nine" in antiquity was often used as a synonym for "many", and in the context of the Chu ci generally refers to a musical arrangement with "nine" modal changes. (Hawkes, 2011 [1985]: 36–37) The "Nine Longings" poems were written by the Han dynasty royal librarian Wang Yi, who is more famous for his commentary on the Chu ci than he is for these original works which he appended to his published annotated copy. (Hawkes, 2011 [1985]: 307)

== Content ==
Wang Yi manages to produce somewhat of a Confucian version of Chuci poetry, using its conventionalized symbolism. In nine verses with an envoi:

- I Meeting with Reproach (Feng you)
- II Resentment against the Ruler (Yuan shang)
- III Impatience with the World (Ji shi)
- IV Pity for the Ruler (Min shang)
- V Running into Danger (Zan e)
- VI Grieving over Disorder (Dao luan)
- VII Distressed by These Times (Shang shi)
- VIII Lament for the Year (Ai sui)
- IX Maintaining Resolution (Shou zhi)
- X Luan

(Hawkes 1985, 307-321)

== See also ==
- Chuci
- List of Chuci contents
- "Nine Regrets"
- Qu Yuan
- "Nine Longings", in Chinese (九思)
