= Sorrow for Troth Betrayed =

Ancient Chinese poem from the Chu Ci

"Sorrow for Troth Betrayed" (Chinese: 惜誓; pinyin: Xī shì; lit. 'Sorrow for Troth Betrayed') is one of the poems anthologized in the ancient Chinese poetry collection, the Chu Ci, which together with the Shijing comprise the two major textual sources for Classical Chinese poetry. The "Sorrow for Troth Betrayed" describes a shamanistic or Daoist type of flight over an area including the axis mundi, Bactria, and the Middle Kingdom, during which the wise and virtuous narrator observes the evils rampant in the world with grief, concluding that in such a case that withdrawal from the world is the only valid option. The poem appears to have been preserved in a somewhat fragmentary form, with several lacunae. The authorship of the "Sorrow for Troth Betrayed" poem has been attributed to both Qu Yuan (d. about BCE 278) and Jia Yi (d. BCE 168 or 169); but, based on internal evidence, Sorrow for Troth Betrayed appears to have been written by an anonymous author after the lifetimes of both Qu Yuan and Jia Yi. (Hawkes, 2011 [1985]: 239)

== See also ==
- Chuci
- Classical Chinese poetry
- List of Chuci contents
- Qu Yuan
- Xian (Taoism)
- 惜誓
