= The Double Ninth =

1929 poem by Mao Zedong

"The Double Nine" (采桑子·重阳) is a poem written by Mao Zedong in 1929. Double Ninth Festival, also called Chong Yang, is an important holiday in China. During this holiday, Chinese people usually go to the top of mountains, looking far away, as a ritual of expecting those family members who are travelling outside to come back home sooner.

Man ages all too easily, not Nature;
Year by year the Double Ninth returns.
On this Double Ninth,
The yellow blooms on the battle field smell sweeter.

Each year the autumn wind blow fierce,
Unlike spring's splendour,
Yet surpassing spring's splendour,
See the endless expanse of frosty sky and water.
