= Seven Remonstrances =

"Seven Remonstrances" or "Seven Admonishments" (traditional Chinese: 七諫; simplified Chinese: 七谏; pinyin: Qī jiàn; lit. 'Seven Admonishments') is one of the 17 major sections of the ancient Chinese poetry collection Chu ci, also known as The Songs of the South or The Songs of Chu. The "Seven Admonishments" consists of seven poetic verses, plus a luan. The Seven Admonishments are written in the persona of Qu Yuan, but the actual poet or poets who authored these pieces is unknown; but, Wang Yi supposes them to have been written by Dongfang Shuo, a supposition which David Hawkes rejects, on various grounds. (Hawkes, 2011 [1985]: 245-246) In terms of poetic quality, Hawkes finds the Qi jian poems to be "extremely derivative" of the other Chu ci pieces, and he further describes them as "a long, almost unrelieved litany of complaint which progresses by mere accumulation and ends only when the poet, reader and metaphor are all three exhausted." (Hawkes, 2011 [1985]: 246).

== Contents ==
Seven Admonishments include seven pieces plus an envoi (luan):

- I When First Exiled (Chu fang)
- II Drowning in the River (Chen jiang)
- III Disgust with the World (Yuan shi)
- IV Embittered Thoughts (Yuan si)
- V Oppressed by Grief (Zi bei)
- VI Mourning my Lot (Ai ming)
- VII Reckless Remonstrance (Miu jian)
- VII Luan

(Hawkes 1985, 245-262)

== See also ==
- List of Chuci contents

=== Sources ===
七諫
