= Huainanzi =

2nd-century BC Chinese treatise

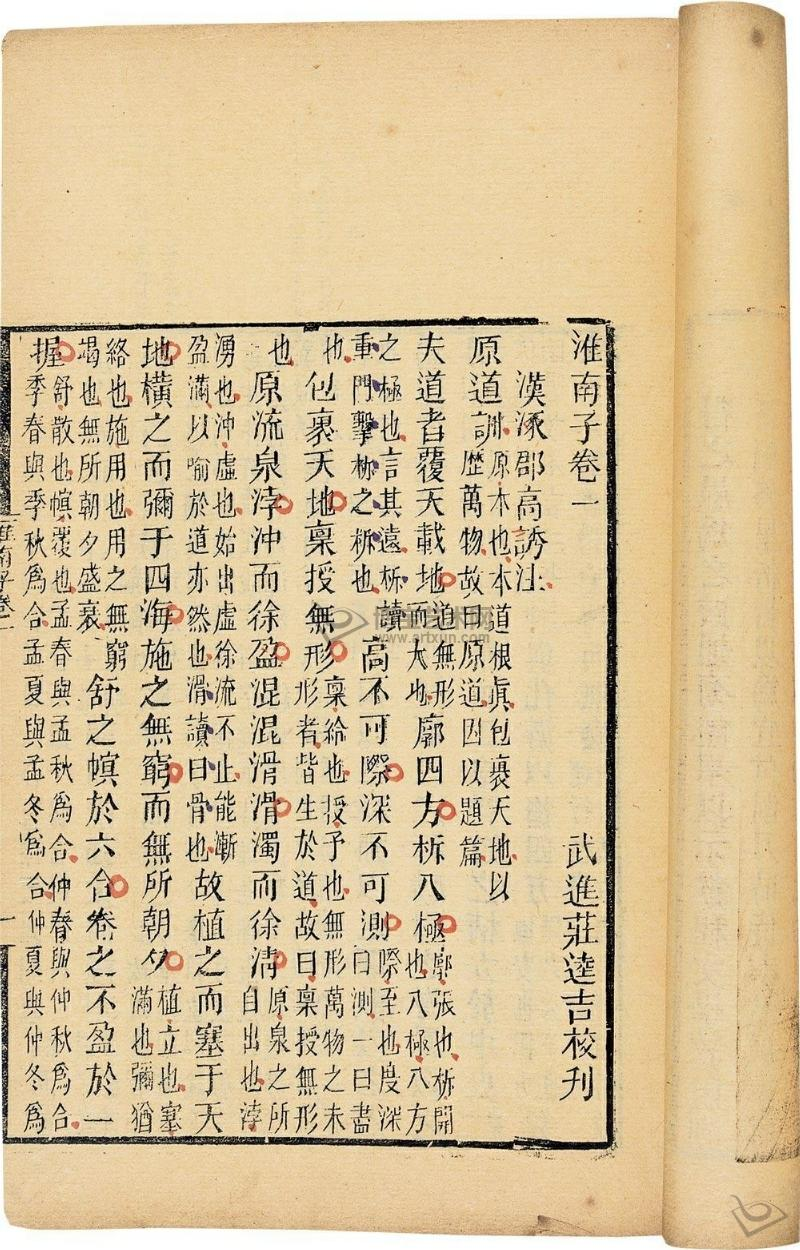
- Qing-era copy of Huainanzi
- Chinese: 淮南子
- Literal meaning: [The Writings of] the Huainan Masters
Transcriptions
Standard Mandarin
- Hanyu Pinyin: Huáinánzǐ
- Gwoyeu Romatzyh: Hwainantzyy
- Wade–Giles: Huai^{2}-nan^{2} tzŭ^{3}
- IPA: [xwǎɪ.nǎn.tsɨ̀]
Yue: Cantonese
- Yale Romanization: Wàaih-nàahm-jí
- Jyutping: Waai^{4}-naam^{4}-zi^{2}
- IPA: [waj˩ nam˩ tsi˧˥]
Southern Min
- Tâi-lô: Huâi-lâm-tsú
Middle Chinese
- Middle Chinese: Hweaj-nom-tzí
Old Chinese
- Baxter–Sagart (2014): *[ɢ]ʷˤrij nˤ[ə]m tsəʔ

The Huainanzi is an ancient philosophical and governmental Chinese text made up of essays from scholarly debates held at the court of Liu An, Prince of Huainan, before 139 BCE. Compiled as a compendium for an enlightened sovereign and his court, the work attempts to define the conditions for a perfect socio-political order, derived mainly from a perfect (or enlightened) ruler. With a notable Zhuangzi 'Taoist' influence, alongside Chinese folk theories of yin and yang and Wu Xing, the Huainanzi draws on Taoist, Legalist, Confucian, and Mohist concepts. But it subverts the latter three in favor of a less active ruler, as prominent in the early Han dynasty before the Emperor Wu.

The early Han authors of the Huainanzi themselves likely preceded Taoist identification, and differ from Taoism as later understood. Sima Tan may have had the "subversive 'syncretism'" of the Huainanzi in mind when he coined the term Daojia ("Taoism"), claiming to "pick what is good among the Confucians and Mohists". Its ideas theoretically contributed to the founding of the Taoist church in 184 c.e..

Confucian bibliographers classified it as Zajia or 'Syncretist', but came to often consider it a Taoist classic, at least by extension of its use of themes from Laozi and Zhuangzi as classics. Though not achieving the status of a classic, it came to be considered an important philosophical work, and was later included in the Daozang. K.C. Hsiao and the work's modern translators considered it a 'principal' example of Han 'Taoism', retrospectively.

== Dating ==
The Huainanzi is said to have been compiled by Liu An for presentation to the Emperor Wu of Han. While the modern translators of the Huainanzi did believe it had been compiled by a Liu An, they believed much of it was earlier written during the reign of Wu's father, Emperor Jing of Han.

Debates on organization of the government had already begun under Jing. Liu An himself would have been around during Jing's reign, and the process of debate and organization were not quick; although increasing under Jing, they date back to the founding of the Han dynasty.

More recent scholarship argues that the final chapter of the Huainanzi, Yaolue, was composed after Liu An's death.

== Jixia inheritance ==
In an earlier work, John S Major, the work's modern translator, considered the Huainanzi a product of the Huainan academy, "maintaining and extending the tradition of the Jixia Academy". The Jixia Academy's Qi state and later Huainan Kingdom border one another, situated around the eastern coastal "periphery of the Chinese Zhongyuan cultural heartland". Despite the interceding events of the Qin and Han dynasties, there is only about a century's difference between the death of the Jixia academy's founder and the founding of the Huainan academy.

== The work ==
Scholars are reasonably certain regarding the date of composition for the Huainanzi. Both the Book of Han and Records of the Grand Historian record that when Liu An paid a state visit to his nephew the Emperor Wu of Han in 139 BC, he presented a copy of his "recently completed" book in twenty-one chapters. Recent research shows that Chapters 1, 2, and 21 of the Huainanzi were performed at the imperial court.

The Huainanzi is an eclectic compilation of chapters or essays that range across topics of religion, history, astronomy, geography, philosophy, science, metaphysics, nature, and politics. It discusses many pre-Han schools of thought, especially the Huang–Lao form of religious Daoism, and contains more than 800 quotations from Chinese classics. The textual diversity is apparent from the chapter titles, listed under the table of contents (tr. Le Blanc, 1985, 15–16).

Some passages are philosophically significant, with one example combining Five Phase and Daoist themes.

When the lute-tuner strikes the kung note [on one instrument], the kung note [on the other instrument] responds: when he plucks the chiao note [on one instrument], the chiao note [on the other instrument] vibrates. This results from having corresponding musical notes in mutual harmony. Now, [let us assume that] someone changes the tuning of one string in such a way that it does not match any of the five notes, and by striking it sets all twenty-five strings resonating. In this case there has as yet been no differentiation as regards sound; it just happens that that [sound] which governs all musical notes has been evoked.

Thus, he who is merged with Supreme Harmony is beclouded as if dead-drunk, and drifts about in its midst in sweet contentment, unaware how he came there; engulfed in pure delight as he sinks to the depths; benumbed as he reaches the end, he is as if he had not yet begun to emerge from his origin. This is called the Great Merging. (chapter 6, tr. Le Blanc 1985:138)

== Taoist reception ==
Anthony C. Yu argued that the Huainanzi can be "unmistakenly denominated" as Taoist in the sense of emphasizing "essential sincerity" as "moving the cosmos", versus Dong Zhongshu's (Confucian) theory of "resonance between heaven and humanity". Recalling the scholarship of Wang Aihe, the two are taken as rival models for the emperor, who is "no longer a self-evident entity", but rather a "set of complex and dynamic relations" - in practice, positional power relations, contested through a proliferation of cosmological theories and interpretations of omens.

The Huainanzi says that "essential sincerity will be felt within" and cause corresponding movement in the Heavens. Yu takes this as an example of ritual. However, while the Huainanzi does have heavy Laozi & Zhuangzi influences, Yu admits that such an example of language and terminologies was "fairly common" across ideologies in the Han dynasty. Language and ritual later taken as specifically Taoist was more common to its general milieu. Though the association is "interesting to note", it becomes an example of Taoist(-specific) ritual in Tang dynasty poetic fiction. If the Huainanzi or early Han 'Daoism' pairs notions of sincerity and rites, so does Xun Kuang and arguably even the Qin dynasty.

Quoting the Book of Rites, the Xunzi says: "To establish sincerity and get rid of artifice is the principle of li ("ritual")." In generalist terms, an implication of the ruler's disposition and attitude as motivating the world is an example of ancient ideas of Wu wei held in common with the Analects. Generally considered addendums, Laozi commentaries in the Han Feizi (ch.20-21) argue a dichotomy between sincerity and complex propriety. But it's esteem of the 'innermost heart' is held in common with Mencius. As an aid to self-cultivation, the Xunzi differs in considering ceremony more important than (inborn) benevolence. Han Fei's Warring States period predecessor Shen Buhai holds somewhat different ideas opposing with Confucianism; but voices no direct opposition, quoting Confucius himself.

== Influences ==
Alongside the Tao Te Ching (Laozi) and Zhuangzi, the Huainanzi includes influences from such works as the Classic of Poetry, Book of Changes, Book of Documents, Han Feizi, Guanzi, Mozi, Lüshi Chunqiu, Chu Ci, and the Classic of Mountains and Seas. Although several of the aforementioned works come to be considered Confucian classics, it is mainly chapter 12 which draws on a combination of Confucian texts, the Lunyu (Analects), Mencius, Xunzi, and Zisizi. Scattered anecdotes are comparable to Mencius, though sometimes differing.

Quantitatively, the Huainanzi's most major influences are the Zhuangzi (269 references) and encyclopedic Lüshi Chunqiu (190), with the Lüshi Chunqiu quoted in twenty of the Huainanzi's twenty one chapters. Most prominently influencing chapters 3-5, much of chapter five quotes directly from the Lushi Chunqiu's first twelve chapters. The Huainanzi's second most major influences are drawn from the Tao Te Ching (99) and Han Feizi (72), or a bit less than half as much, including traces of the Han Feizi's predecessor Shen Buhai.

=== Laozi, Zhuangzi, and Han Feizi ===
The first, second and twelfth chapters of the work are based on the Laozi, with Chapter's 2 title "Activating the Genuine" referring to the Dao. But in the evaluation of the Huainanzi's modern translators, the work most strongly resonates with the Zhuangzi. All of Chapter 2's primary themes draw on the Zhuangzi, with one section drawing on such classic Inner Zhuangzi imagery as the "Great Clod" representing Earth and the Dao, and "The Butterfly Dream".

Zhuangzi influences only existed as traces in the earlier, late Warring States period Han Feizi, and the Mawangdui silk texts Huangdi sijing, entombed in the early Han dynasty, still did not associate Laozi and Zhuangzi together. In these terms, the Huainanzi is notable as the main evidence of Zhuangzi influence in the Han dynasty.

The Huainanzi is the first Han dynasty work pairing together the Han Feizi's combination of Shang Yang and Shen Buhai, but disparagingly glosses them together as penal (Shen Buhai issued laws, but was not evidently as penal as Shang Yang). One section briefly re-frames a story from the Han Feizi, adding Laozi, Confucius and Han Fei as characters. Confucius is portrayed as approving Laozi leniency (in the Huainanzi's framing "to attract those who would admonish (the ruler"), while Han Fei decries what he takes to be a failure to punish the officials as abandoning ritual.

== Reformist conservatism ==
If Dong Zhongshu was familiar with the Huainanzi, its "syncretism" would likely have infuriated him, deciding for itself the relation between fundamental Confucian texts and relegating them to one quarter of the "fundamentals of rulership." Though positively receiving earlier reunification of the empire, the Huainanzi opposed a growing expansion of centralized government, with its upcoming class of attending (Confucian) scholar-officials.

Not believing decentralization would win out, the Huainanzi sought to forge a "third way" between centralization and decentralization - with the interest of the local kingdoms in mind. To this end, it places heavenly prognosticators above (Confucian) ritual specialists, and advocates ideas of wuwei nonaction, recommending the ruler put aside trivial matters to follow Fuxi and Nüwa, abiding in Pure Unity as Empty Nothingness. Aiming to demonstrate how every text before it is part of its own integral unity, the Huainanzi posed a threat to the Han court.

When the First Emperor of Qin conquered the world, he feared that he would not be able to defend it. Thus, he attacked the Rong border tribes, repaired the Great Wall, constructed passes and bridges, erected barricades and barriers, equipped himself with post stations and charioteers, and dispatched troops to guard the borders of his empire. When, however, the house of Liu Bang took possession of the world, it was as easy as turning a weight in the palm of your hand.

In ancient times, King Wu of Zhou vanquished tyrant Djou... (and then) distributed the grain in the Juqiao granary, disbursed the wealth in the Deer Pavilion, destroyed the war drums and drumsticks, unbent his bows and cut their strings. He moved out of his palace and lived exposed to the wilds to demonstrate that life would be peaceful and simple. He lay down his waist sword and took up the breast tablet to demonstrate that he was free of enmity. As a consequence, the entire world sang his praises and rejoiced in his rule, while the Lords of the Land came bearing gifts of silk and seeking audiences with him. [His dynasty endured] for thirty-four generations without interruption.

Therefore, the Laozi says: "Those good at shutting use no bolts, yet what they shut cannot be opened; those good at tying use no cords, yet what they tie cannot be unfastened." Chapter 12.47

== Table of contents ==
Number	Name	Reading	Meaning
1	原道訓	Yuandao	Searching out Dao (Tao)
2	俶真訓	Chuzhen	Beginning of Reality
3	天文訓	Tianwen	Patterns of Heaven
4	墜形訓	Zhuixing	Forms of Earth
5	時則訓	Shize	Seasonal Regulations
6	覽冥訓	Lanming	Peering into the Obscure
7	精神訓	Jingshen	Seminal Breath and Spirit
8	本經訓	Benjing	Fundamental Norm
9	主術訓	Zhushu	Craft of the Ruler
10	繆稱訓	Miucheng	On Erroneous Designations
11	齊俗訓	Qisu	Placing Customs on a Par
12	道應訓	Daoying	Responses of Dao
13	氾論訓	Fanlun	A Compendious Essay
14	詮言訓	Quanyan	An Explanatory Discourse
15	兵略訓	Binglue	On Military Strategy
16	說山訓	Shuoshan	Discourse on Mountains
17	說林訓	Shuolin	Discourse on Forests
18	人間訓	Renjian	In the World of Man
19	脩務訓	Youwu	Necessity of Training
20	泰族訓	Taizu	Grand Reunion
21	要略	Yaolue	Outline of the Essentials

== Notable translations ==
- Major, John S.; Queen, Sarah A.; Meyer, Andrew Seth; Roth, Harold D. (2010). The Huainanzi. Columbia University Press. ISBN 978-0-231-52085-0.
- Le Blanc, Charles; Mathieu, Rémi (2003). Philosophes Taoïstes II: Huainan zi (in French). Paris: Gallimard.

Translations that focus on individual chapters include:

- Balfour, Frederic H. (1884). Taoist Texts, Ethical, Political, and Speculative. London: Trübner.
- Morgan, Evan (1933). Tao, the Great Luminant: Essays from the Huai-nan-tzu. London: Kegan Paul, Trench, Trübner & Co.
- Wallacker, Benjamin (1962). The Huai-nan-tzu, Book Eleven: Behavior Culture and the Cosmos. New Haven: American Oriental Society.
- Komjathy, Louis (2015). Contemplative Literature: A Comparative Sourcebook on Meditation and Contemplative Prayer. Albany, NY: State University of New York Press. ISBN 978-1-4384-5705-5.
  - Roth, Harold D. (2015). "Daoist Apophatic Meditation: Selections from the Classical Daoist Textual Corpus". In Komjathy, Louis (ed.). Contemplative Literature: A Comparative Sourcebook on Meditation and Contemplative Prayer. Albany, NY: State University of New York Press. pp. 89–144. ISBN 978-1-4384-5705-5.
- Kusuyama, Haruki (1979–1988). E-nan-ji 淮南子 [Huainanzi]. Shinshaku kanbun taikei (in Japanese). Vol. 54, 55, 62.
- Larre, Claude (1982). Le Traité VIIe du Houai nan tseu: Les esprits légers et subtils animateurs de l'essence [Huainanzi Chapter 7 Translation: Light Spirits and Subtle Animators of Essence]. Variétés sinologiques (in French). Vol. 67.
- Ames, Roger T. (1983). The Art of Rulership: A Study in Ancient Chinese Political Thought. Honolulu: University of Hawaii Press.
- Le Blanc, Charles (1985). Huai nan tzu; Philosophical Synthesis in Early Han Thought: The Idea of Resonance (Kan-ying) With a Translation and Analysis of Chapter Six. Hong Kong: Hong Kong University Press.
- Major, John S. (1993). Heaven and Earth in Early Han Thought: Chapters Three, Four and Five of the Huainanzi. Albany: State University of New York Press.
- Ames, Roger T.; Lau, D.C. (1998). Yuan Dao: Tracing Dao to Its Source. New York: Ballantine Books.

== Television series ==
- The Legend of Huainanzi
