= List of Chu Ci contents =

This is a list of the sections and individual pieces contained within the ancient poetry anthology Chu Ci (traditional Chinese: 楚辭; simplified Chinese: 楚辞; pinyin: chǔ cí; Wade–Giles: Ch'u Tz'u), also known as Songs of the South or Songs of Chu, which is an anthology of Classical Chinese poetry verse traditionally attributed to Qu Yuan and Song Yu from the Warring States period, though about half of the poems seem to have been composed several centuries later, during the Han dynasty. The traditional version of the Chu Ci contains 17 major sections, and was edited by Wang Yi (Chinese: 王逸), a 2nd-century AD librarian who served under Emperor Shun of Han. The Chu Ci and the Shi Jing together constitute the chief sources of pre-Qin dynasty Chinese verse.

== "Encountering Sorrow" ==
"Li Sao" (traditional Chinese: 離騷; simplified Chinese: 离骚; pinyin: Lí sāo; lit. 'On Encountering Trouble, or, Encountering Sorrow') is one of the most famous of the works contained in the Chu Ci: it mainly is upon a theme of seemingly autobiographical material about the relationship between Qu Yuan and the leadership of the Chu kingdom. Although often interpreted as a political allegory, other aspects of this rather long poem seem to refer to religious and mythological themes derived from the culture of the Chu area. Source text of Li Sao (in Chinese): 離騷.

== "Nine Songs" ==
"Jiu Ge" (Chinese: 九歌; pinyin: Jiǔ gē; lit. 'Nine Songs'), despite the "Nine" in the title, the "Jiu Ge" actually includes eleven discrete parts or songs. These seem to represent some shamanistic dramatic practices of the Yangzi River valley area and other areas involving the invocation of divine beings and seeking their blessings by means of a process of courtship. Text (in Chinese): 九歌

The titles of the poems in Chinese are as follows. English translations of titles follow David Hawkes:

Standard order	English translation	Transcription (based on Pinyin)	Traditional Chinese	Simplified Chinese
1	The Great Unity, God of the Eastern Sky	"Dong Huang Tai Yi"	東皇太一	东皇太一
2	The Lord within the Clouds	"Yun Zhong Jun"	雲中君	云中君
3	The Goddess of the Xiang	"Xiang Jun"	湘君	湘君
4	The Lady of the Xiang	"Xiang Fu Ren"	湘夫人	湘夫人
5	The Greater Master of Fate	"Da Si Ming"	大司命	大司命
6	The Lesser Master of Fate	"Shao Si Ming"	少司命	少司命
7	The Lord of the East	"Dong Jun"	東君	东君
8	The River Earl	"He Bo"	河伯	河伯
9	The Mountain Spirit	"Shan Gui"	山鬼	山鬼
10	Hymn to the Fallen	"Guo Shang"	國殤	国殇
11	Honouring the Dead	"Li Hun"	禮魂	礼魂

== "Heavenly Questions" ==
"Tian Wen" (Chinese: 天問; pinyin: Tiān wèn; lit. 'Heavenly Questions'), also known as Questions to Heaven, addressed to Tian (or "Heaven"), consists of series of questions, 172 in all, in verse format. The series of questions asked involves Chinese mythology and ancient Chinese religious beliefs. The answers are not explicated. Text (in Chinese): 天問. One piece.

== "Nine Pieces" ==
"Jiu Zhang" (Chinese: 九章; pinyin: Jiǔ zhāng; lit. 'Nine Pieces, or Nine Declarations') consists of nine pieces of poetry, one of which is the "Lament for Ying" ("Ai Ying"). Ying was the name of one of the traditional capital cities of Qu Yuan's homeland of Chu (eventually, Ying and Chu even became synonymous). However, both the city of Ying and the entire state of Chu itself experienced doom due to the expansion of the state of Qin, which ended up consolidating China at the expense of the other former independent states: including Qu Yuan's home state — hence the "Lament". Text in Chinese: 九章.

Standard order	English translation	Transcription (based on Pinyin)	Traditional Chinese	Simplified Chinese
1	Grieving I Make My Plaint	Xi Song	惜誦	惜诵
2	Crossing the River	She Jiang	涉江	涉江
3	A Lament for Ying	Ai Ying	哀郢	哀郢
4	The Outpouring of Sad Thoughts	Chou Si	抽思	抽思
5	Embracing Sand	Huai Sha	懷沙	怀沙
6	Thinking of a Fair One	Si Meiren	思美人	思美人
7	Alas for the Days Gone By	Xi Wangri	昔往日	昔往日
8	In Praise of the Orange-Tree	Ju Song	橘頌	橘颂
9	Grieving at the Eddying Wind	Bei Hui Feng	悲回風	悲回风

Note that poem numbers 1, 6, 7, and 9 actually lack titles in the original text; rather, they are named for the sake of convenience after the first few words with which these poems begin. English titles based on David Hawkes' translations.

== "Far-off Journey" ==
"Yuan You" (traditional Chinese: 遠遊; simplified Chinese: 远游; pinyin: Yuǎn yóu; lit. 'Far-off Journey') 遠遊 One piece.

== "Divination" ==
"Bu Ju" (Chinese: 卜居; pinyin: Bǔ jū; lit. 'Divination') 卜居. One piece, mixed poetry and prose.

== "The Fisherman" ==
"Yu Fu" (traditional Chinese: 漁父; simplified Chinese: 渔父; pinyin: Yú fù; lit. 'The Fisherman'). Text source (Chinese): 漁父. One piece, mixed poetry and prose.

== "Nine Changes" ==
"Nine Changes" (traditional Chinese: 九辯; simplified Chinese: 九辩; pinyin: Jiǔ biàn; lit. 'Nine Changes', or "Nine Disputations", or "Nine Arguments"). Attributed to Song Yu. Chinese source: 九辯. Number of individual pieces uncertain. No separate titles.

== "Summons of the Soul" ==
"Summons of the Soul" (Chinese: 招魂; pinyin: Zhāo Hún; lit. 'Summons of the Soul'). Text source (in Chinese): 招魂. One piece.

== "The Great Summons" ==
"The Great Summons" (Chinese: 大招; pinyin: Dà zhāo; lit. 'The Great Summons'). Text source (in Chinese): 大招. One piece.

== "Sorrow for Troth Betrayed" ==
"Sorrow for Troth Betrayed" (Chinese: 惜誓; pinyin: Xī shì; lit. 'Sorrow for Troth Betrayed'). Text source (in Chinese): 惜誓. One piece, with luan.

== "Summons for a Recluse" ==
"Summons for a Recluse" (traditional Chinese: 招隱士; simplified Chinese: 招隐士; pinyin: Zhāo yǐnshì; lit. 'Summons for a Recluse'). Textsource (in Chinese): 招隱士. One piece.

== "Seven Remonstrances" ==
"Seven Remonstrances" (traditional Chinese: 七諫; simplified Chinese: 七谏; pinyin: Qī jiàn; lit. 'Seven Admonishments'). Text source (in Chinese): 七諫. Seven pieces, plus luan.

- I When First Exiled (Chu fang)
- II Drowning in the River (Chen jiang)
- III Disgust with the World (Yuan shi)
- IV Embittered Thoughts (Yuan si)
- V Oppressed by Grief (Zi bei)
- VI Mourning my Lot (Ai ming)
- VII Reckless Remonstrance (Miu jian)
- VIII Luan

== "Alas That My Lot Was Not Cast" ==
"Alas That My Lot Was Not Cast" (traditional Chinese: 哀時命; simplified Chinese: 哀时命; pinyin: Āi shí mìng; lit. 'Lamenting this Season of Fate'). Chinese text source: 哀時命. One piece.

== "Nine Regrets" ==
"Nine Regrets" (traditional Chinese: 九懷; simplified Chinese: 九怀; pinyin: Jiǔ huái or Jiǔ Huái; lit. 'Nine Regrets or Verses on Huai'). Attributed to Wang Bao, who flourished during the reign of Emperor Xuan of Han. Source text (in Chinese): 九懷. Consists of nine sections, plus a luan (envoi).

- I Release from Worldly Contrivings (Kuang ji)
- II A Road to Beyond (Tong lu)
- III Dangerous Heights (Wei jun)
- IV A Light on the World (Zhao shi)
- V Honouring the Good (Zun jia)
- VI Stored Blossoms (Xu ying)
- VII Thoughts on Loyalty Bent (Si zhong)
- VIII Raising Barriers (Tao yong)
- IX Quenching the Light (Zhu zhao)
- X Luan (envoi)

== "Nine Laments" ==
"Nine Laments" (traditional Chinese: 九歎; simplified Chinese: 九叹; pinyin: Jiǔ tàn; lit. 'Nine Laments'). (歎 is a variant for 嘆). Written by Liu Xiang (77-6 BCE). Text (in Chinese): 九歎. Nine pieces, each one including a final "Lament", entitled 'Embittered Thoughts':

1. 'Encountering Troubles'
2. 'Leaving the World'
3. 'Embittered Thoughts'
4. 'Going Far Away'
5. 'Lament for the Worthy'
6. 'Saddened by Sufferings'
7. 'Grieved by this Fate'
8. 'Sighing for Olden Times'
9. 'The Far-off Journey'

== "Nine Longings" ==
"Nine Longings" (Chinese: 九思; pinyin: Jiǔ sī; lit. 'Nine Thoughts'). By Wang Yi, a Han dynasty librarian and compiler and annotator of the Chu Ci. Chinese text source: 九思. Nine pieces, plus a luan:

- I Meeting with Reproach (Feng you)
- II Resentment against the Ruler (Yuan shang)
- III Impatience with the World (Ji shi)
- IV Pity for the Ruler (Min shang)
- V Running into Danger (Zan e)
- VI Grieving over Disorder (Dao luan)
- VII Distressed by These Times (Shang shi)
- VIII Lament for the Year (Ai sui)
- IX Maintaining Resolution (Shou zhi)
- X Luan

== See also ==
- Chinese mythology
