= Wong Kwok-pun =

Hong Kong scholar and poet (born 1946)

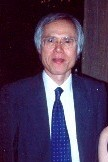
- Wong in 2004
- Born: 1946 (age 79–80); British Hong Kong
- Education: University of Hong Kong (BA, MPhil); University of Toronto (PhD)

Wong Kwok-pun (also known as Laurence Wong, Chinese: 黃國彬; Cantonese [wɔ̀ːŋ kʷɔ̄ːk pɐ́n]; Jyutping: wong4 gwok3 ban1; Mandarin Pinyin: Huang Guobin) is a Hong Kong scholar, poet and translator. He is most famous for rendering Dante's La Divina Commedia into Chinese while preserving the terza rima rhyming scheme, an approach no Chinese translator had ever tried to take.

He was born in Hong Kong in 1946 and grew up there, his original hometown being Guangzhou. He received his BA (English and Translation) and MPhil (English) from The University of Hong Kong and his PhD (East Asian Studies) from the University of Toronto. He taught in the Department of English Studies and Comparative Literature at The University of Hong Kong from 1982 to 1986 and in the Department of Languages, Literatures, and Linguistics at York University in Canada from 1987 to 1992. After being the professor of the Department of Translation at Lingnan University, he is now teaching in the Chinese University of Hong Kong as research professor.

He is a polyglot, familiar with Classical Greek, Latin, French, Italian, German, and Spanish, as well as Chinese and English. He studied for some time in Florence to better understand Dante.

One of his poems, On Listening to Louis Chen's Zither (Traditional Chinese: 聽陳蕾士的琴箏), was selected into the Chinese textbooks for secondary school students in Hong Kong. In the poem Wong uses synesthesia to describe his audial experiences. The poem has been included as an essential text in Hong Kong secondary school textbooks since the 1990s. Wong apologised to students in 2006, for many students consider the poem too difficult to be understood for examination in the HKCEE subject of Chinese Language. Since 2007, students no longer need to study the poem for HKCEE.

Most of his books are published in Taiwan, including the ground-breaking Dante translation, though he lives and works in Hong Kong.

Besides poetry and translation, he has published several books of literary criticism and translation studies.
