= Looking up at the Starry Sky =

Looking up at the Starry Sky (Chinese: 仰望星空; pinyin: yǎng wàng xīng kōng) is a widely known poem written by the Chinese Premier Wen Jiabao "to encourage young people to aim high and pursue their goals fearlessly." The poem is directed at the Post-80s, who are China's Generation Y, and who may have Little Emperor Syndrome due to the one-child policy.

== See also ==
- May Fourth Movement
- Strawberry generation
