= Ju Song =

Classical Chinese poem

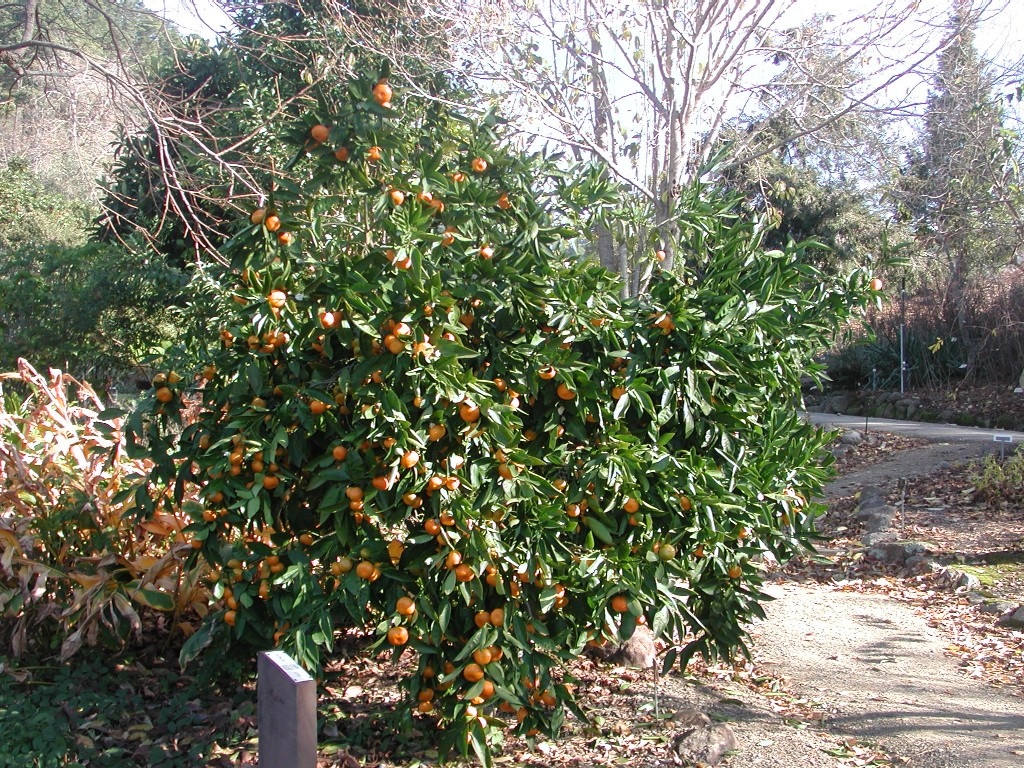
An orange-tree (Citrus reticulata)

Ju Song (simplified Chinese: 橘颂; traditional Chinese: 橘頌; pinyin: Jú sòng; lit. 'In praise of an orange') is a Classical Chinese poem which has been preserved in the Nine Pieces (Jiu Zhang) section of the ancient Chinese poetry anthology, the Chu ci, or The Songs of Chu. The poem has been translated into English by David Hawkes as "In Praise of the Orange-Tree". In the poem, the orange-tree is used as a metaphor for certain human qualities, such as "steadfastness". Hawkes explains this by the tradition that this type of orange tree is supposed to grow naturally only in the part of China which included the ancient land of Chu (as opposed to the northern plain). The particular orange-tree (ju) mentioned is what David Hawkes calls "citrus nobilis"; but, this type of orange (or its hybrids) is now usually botanically referred to as Citrus reticulata, or else by the common name of "mandarin orange".

== Symbolism ==
The word ju, meaning "orange (fruit or tree)" is phonetically reminiscent of the word zhù (祝), which means "to wish or pray for", as in the phrase zhù fú (祝福), "to wish or pray for good luck", thus the orange is symbolically a "harbinger of good luck". Also in ancient times the emperor gave oranges to his officials,; thus the emperor could be said to be like an orange tree, both being a source of orange fruits (and the metaphor could be extended).

== Meter ==
"Ju Song" is written throughout in what David Hawkes calls "7-plus" meter; that is, each line has 7 regular syllables, augmented by a refrain word repeated in each line. In this case, the final syllable of each line is the exclamatory particle 兮 (xī).

== Context ==
"Ju Song" is one of the nine poems of the Jiu Zhang (Nine Pieces) section of the Chu Ci, but is quite different from the other poems in this section; so that, as David Hawkes puts it "it is hard to see how it came to be included in the same collection".

== Poem ==
The poem appears to praise a prince or other young man, according to David Hawkes (178), by an extended comparison between the young man and an orange tree. David Hawkes describes the poem as being "charming". The author is unknown, although as usual with the Chu ci pieces, Qu Yuan has been given attribution, although in this case, this is not to likely given the evidence of the advanced metrical style (Hawkes 1985, 178). The final line of the poem makes an allusion to "Bo Yi", referring to the pair of brothers whose loyalty to the previous Shang dynasty resulted in that they preferred to starve to death than to symbolically submit to the succeeding Zhou dynasty by eating the produce of the land, which Zhou in their view had usurped from Shang.

== See also ==
- Chu ci
- Citrus
- List of Chuci contents
