= Wo Bau-Sae =

Wo Bau-Sae (simplified Chinese: 华抱山; traditional Chinese: 華抱山; pinyin: Huà Bàoshān) is an epic poem of Wu Chinese long narrative verses found around the Lake Tai region in Southeastern China. The backdrop of the story is set in the Ming dynasty, when heroes from three generations of the Wo (Mandarin: Hua) family: Wo Lon-Ken (华龙根; Hua Longgen), Wo Bau-Sae (Hua Baoshan), and Wo Lon-Lon (华龙龙; Hua Longlong) participated in a rebellion against Ming rule.
