= Nine Laments =

"Nine Laments" (traditional Chinese: 九歎; simplified Chinese: 九叹; pinyin: Jiǔ tàn; lit. 'Nine Laments') is one of the 17 major sections of the ancient Chinese poetry collection Chu ci, also known as The Songs of the South or The Songs of Chu. The "Nine Laments" consists of nine verses, each with an individual name, and each with a main part, paired with a concluding "lament". The "Nine Laments" is one of the several collections of poems grouped under the title of "Nine" something-or-others, which do not necessarily consist of 9 pieces of poetry. One of the older of them, Jiu Ge ("Nine Songs") consists of 11 individual pieces: "nine" in antiquity was often used as a synonym for "many", and in the context of the Chu ci generally refers to a musical arrangement with "nine" modal changes (Hawkes 2011 [1985], 36-37). The "Nine Laments" poems are attributed to Liu Xiang (Hawkes 2011 [1985], 280-282).

== Contents ==
Nine Laments consists of nine individual pieces. Each of these pieces consists of a main section followed by a "Lament" section:

- 1. 'Encountering Troubles'
- 2. 'Leaving the World'
- 3. 'Embittered Thoughts'
- 4. 'Going Far Away'
- 5. 'Lament for the Worthy'
- 6. 'Saddened by Sufferings'
- 7. 'Grieved by this Fate'
- 8. 'Sighing for Olden Times'
- 9. 'The Far-off Journey'

== See also ==
- List of Chuci contents

=== Sources ===
- "Nine Laments" (九歎), text source, in Chinese
