= Wang Yi (librarian) =

Chinese poet and librarian (89–158)

- Chinese: 王逸
Transcriptions
Standard Mandarin
- Hanyu Pinyin: Wáng Yì
- Gwoyeu Romatzyh: Wang Yih
- Wade–Giles: Wang^{2} I^{4}
- IPA: [wǎŋ î]
Yue: Cantonese
- Yale Romanization: Wòhng Yaht
- Jyutping: Wong^{4} Jat^{6}
Southern Min
- Tâi-lô: Ông It

Wang Yi (Chinese: 王逸; c. 89–158 CE), courtesy name Shushi (Chinese: 叔師), was a Chinese anthologist, librarian, and poet during the Eastern Han dynasty who was employed in the Imperial Library by the Later Han emperor Shun Di (r. 125–144 CE). Wang Yi is known for his work on the poetry anthology Chu Ci. Although with varying reliability, his commentaries on this work are a main source of information regarding some of its often obscure textual references.

== Biography ==
Wang Yi was born in the former territory of the State of Chu, in what is now Yicheng, Hubei. Chu had existed as an independent political entity for many centuries, and for much of that time as one of the major regional powers, until its defeat in BCE 223, by Qin, some four centuries before the birth of Wang Yi. The Qin political unification of China by military conquest was followed by a deliberate policy of enforcing cultural uniformity throughout the new empire. Still, his associations with the former Chu region gave Wang an advantage in terms of explaining some of the dialectic words or the customs of Chu.

== Family ==
Wang Yi had a son, Wang Yanshou, a poet. One of Yanshou's poems, "The Nightmare", was translated by Arthur Waley, in Chinese Poems.

== Works ==
Wang Yi's main known works are his introductory commentaries on the Chu Ci and its individual works as well as his original poetry written in the Chu Ci style. Although Wang Yi is sometimes attributed as selecting and compiling the Chu Ci in its present form, he himself specifically denies this, attributing the compilation instead to Liu Xiang, except for his own original contributions. (And, it turns out, this does not include the commentaries on Wang's own Chu Ci imitations.) Also, the order in which the Chu Ci material is presented in modern editions dates from the tenth or eleventh centuries at the earliest, when Wang Yi's edition was rearranged.

Wang Yi wrote nine poems in the Chu Ci style, which he contributed as part of his Chu Ci anthology, adding them on to the book's end, as the custom was in such a case. These poems appear under the collective title of Nine Longings (Jiu si), in the seventeenth and final major section (juan) of the Chu Ci anthology. In terms of quality, these works by Wang Yi have nowhere near the fame and acclaim of "On Encountering Trouble" (Li Sao), or some of the other poems: David Hawkes describes Wang's "Nine Longings" poems as "not very inspired verses".

Wang Yi is also known for writing in the fu style which was typically popular during the Han dynasty, one example being his "Fu on the Lychee" (Chinese: 荔枝賦; pinyin: Lìzhī fù).

== See also ==
- Chu ci
- Fu (poetry)
- List of Chuci contents
- Liu An
- Liu Xiang (scholar)
- Nine Longings
- Song Yu
- Qu Yuan
- Wang Bao
