= Lament for Ying =

Chinese poem by Qu Yuan

Lament for Ying (Chinese: 哀郢; pinyin: Āi Yǐng) is a poem which has sometimes been attributed to Chinese poet Qu Yuan, and dated to around 278 BCE. Lament for Ying is from the "Nine Declarations" (Jiu Zhang) section of the Chuci poetry anthology, compiled in ancient China. The Ying in the title is a toponym (placename). The word Ai implies a post-destruction lamentation for this place. Ying was famous as the capital of the kingdom of Chu, Qu Yuan's homeland.

== Background ==
According to tradition, Qu Yuan, a patriot of the State of Chu, his home country, wrote the work in anguish as the Qin general Bai Qi marched his troops upon Ying, capital of Chu (in present-day Hubei Province), threatening to invade. In the face of the imminent peril confronting his homeland, he was filled with fury and grief. The poem expresses his deep concern and worry for his country's fate, his pity for the people of Chu, and his anger at the country's self-indulgent ruler who had allowed this tragedy to befall them.
