= Liu An =

Han dynasty Chinese scholar and prince

- Traditional Chinese: 劉安
- Simplified Chinese: 刘安
Transcriptions
Standard Mandarin
- Hanyu Pinyin: Liú Ān
- IPA: [ljǒʊ án]
Yue: Cantonese
- Yale Romanization: Làuh Ōn
- Jyutping: Lau^{4} On^{1}
- IPA: [lɐw˩ ɔn˥]
Southern Min
- Hokkien POJ: Lâu An
Middle Chinese
- Middle Chinese: Ljuw 'An
Old Chinese
- Baxter–Sagart (2014): *mə-ru ʔˤan (or ʔˤar)

Liu An
- King of Huainan
- Reign: 164 BC-122 BC
- Predecessor: Liu He
- Born: 179 BC
- Died: 122 BC (aged 57)
- Issue: Prince Liu Buhai; Prince Liu Qian; Princess Liu Ling
- Father: Liu Chang, Prince Li of Huainan
- Mother: Lady Yong
- Occupation: Cartographer, monarch, philosopher

Liú Ān (Chinese: 劉安, c. 179–122 BC) was a Chinese monarch, philosopher and cartographer. A Han dynasty prince ruling the Huainan Kingdom, Liu An advised his nephew, Emperor Wu of Han (武帝). He is best known for editing the (139 BC) Huainanzi compendium of Daoist, Confucianist, and Legalist teachings and is credited for inventing tofu. Early texts represent Liu An in three ways: the "author-editor of a respected philosophical symposium", the "bumbling rebel who took his life to avoid arrest", and the successful Daoist adept who transformed into a xian and "rose into the air to escape prosecution for trumped-up charges of treason and flew to eternal life."

== Life ==
Liu An was the grandson of Liu Bang, the founding emperor of the Han dynasty. After his father died, he became the Prince of Huainan, the lands south of the Huai River, at the age of 16.

Liu An had two sons. The younger was Liu Qian (刘迁), who was born by his princess consort and thus became heir to Huainan, while the elder, Liu Buhai (刘不害), was born to a concubine. Liu An favoured Liu Qian over Liu Buhai and never viewed the latter as his son. Liu Qian never regarded Liu Buhai as his elder brother. According to Tui'en Ling (推恩令, Order to Expand Favours), Liu Buhai could become a marquess if Liu An carved a part of Huainan for him as his fief, but Liu An never did. Liu Jian (刘建), son of Liu Buhai, having realized that both he and his father had little chance to be a marquess, became so resentful that he accused Liu An and Liu Qian of a coup attempt. Finally, in a fate similar to his father, Liu An committed suicide in 122 BC after his plot was revealed.

== Literature ==
Noted for his literary ability, Liu An was reputed to be able to compose an elaborate work of prose between waking and finishing breakfast. In addition to composing literary pieces himself, Liu An also frequently invited other scholars as guests to his estate. Eight of these scholars in particular became known as the Eight Immortals of Huainan (淮南八仙).

=== Huainanzi ===
Together with the Eight Immortals of Huainan and/or other members of his literary circle, Liu An published a treatise in 139 BC. known as the Huainanzi, translated as "Book of the Master of Huainan", or the "Huainan Philosophers". This book is considered one of the cornerstones of Taoist philosophy, along with the works of Laozi and Zhuangzi. Along with the earlier ShuJing (Classic of History) of the 5th century BC (Warring States era), this book provided further concrete information on geography, including descriptions of the topography of China. His book was also concerned with mathematics and music, making use of the "Pythagorean comma" and listing the first known Chinese 12 tone musical tuning.

=== Chu ci ===
One of the two major ancient Chinese poetry collections was the Chu ci, also known as The Songs of the South or The Songs of Chu (the other being the Shijing). The seminal poem of the collection is the "Li Sao", generally agreed to be by Qu Yuan. Liu An wrote an introduction to the "Li Sao" as well as the first known commentary. There is also reasonable evidence that Liu An was the first editor and anthologist of the original Chu ci collection. The poem Zhao yin shi (Summons for a Recluse) is attributed to Liu An. Also, "Yuan You" ("Far-off Journey") shows many similarities to the work of the literary circle around Liu An.

== Legend of inventing soy milk ==
According to the legend, Liu An developed soy milk for his old, ill mother. She wanted to taste soybeans but couldn't chew, so Liu An ground the soybeans into milk, apparently upon her suggestion. No contemporaneous sources supports the legend. In the Ming dynasty reference work Bencao Gangmu, author Li Shizhen describes the development of bean curd (tofu) but does not mention a particular inventor. The attribution of the invention of tofu to Liu An was also made by another Ming dynasty writer, Li Yi (李翊). During the Song dynasty in the 10th century, Zhu Xi had already written of the method of Huainan in "Song of Bean Curd" ("豆腐詩"). It is also mentioned in a book that called bean curd "Lai Ki" in the Han dynasty, and the word appeared in an early Song dynasty writing. Other Chinese sources discredit the Liu An invention theory, however, and state that Liu An lived with a lot of vegetarian monks and the method was taught by them. The Chinese Daoists that he recruited used "alchemical" methods to make both soy milk and bean curd, perhaps as a medicine for eternal life. As a powerful noble, Liu An could order the (relative) mass-production of such items and spread them around, thus making him famous for soy milk and bean curd. Still, many place Liu An as the inventor of both bean curd and soy milk.

A different tradition could be found in 《金華地方風俗志》 and 《中國風俗故事集》, which mention that soy milk and bean curd were made before the Han dynasty. These traditions date soy milk to the warring states period by the Yan general Yue Yi, These two books are rather recent and the quote in it was only a legend told to bean curd makers orally, without written record.

== Legend of immortality ==
One day, eight old men came to visit Liu An's palace. When they arrived, a servant told them that he only wanted visitors who had something to offer him and that he was only interested in people who had knowledge of longevity and immortality, martial artists, and renowned scholars. He then asked how such old men could have something to offer. The old men laughed and transformed themselves into young men. The servant knew they were immortals immediately and went to get Liu An. They spent nine years teaching him their secret practices, which enabled An to create a pill of immortality.

Just as Liu An's apprenticeship was coming to an end, his son was accidentally killed during a sword-fighting practice session by one of the emperor's secretaries. Fearing reprisal from the boy's father, the secretary told the emperor that Liu An was plotting a rebellion in order to get the emperor to have him executed. Through their supernatural wisdom, the eight taoists knew of the plot and warned Liu An that he had to leave right away. He rushed to his cauldron to eat one of the immortal pills, and knocked it over. He ate one himself, but the others that spilled on the floor were all eaten by cats and dogs before he could pick them up.

When soldiers came to arrest Liu An, they found the palace empty, so they asked locals where he was. They told the soldiers that they saw him flying into the sky followed by a pack of dogs and cats.

== See also ==
- List of geographers
- List of Chinese people
- List of Chinese writers
- List of Chu Ci contents
