= Liu Xiang (scholar) =

Chinese official, scholar and writer (77–6 BCE)

- Born: Liu Gengsheng; 77 BCE; Xuzhou, Western Han
- Died: 6 BCE (aged 71)
- Issue: Liu Xin
- Father: Liu De, Marquis Miao of Yangcheng
- Religion: Confucianism
- Occupation: Astronomer, historian, librarian, poet, politician, writer

Liu Xiang
- Traditional Chinese: 劉向
- Simplified Chinese: 刘向
Transcriptions
Standard Mandarin
- Hanyu Pinyin: Liú Xiàng
- Gwoyeu Romatzyh: Liou Shianq
- Wade–Giles: Liu Hsiang
- IPA: [ljǒʊ ɕjâŋ]
Yue: Cantonese
- Yale Romanization: Làuh Heung
- Jyutping: Lau^{4} Hoeng^{3}
- IPA: [lɐw˩ hœŋ˧]
Southern Min
- Tâi-lô: Lâu Hiòng
Middle Chinese
- Middle Chinese: Ljuw Xjàng
Old Chinese
- Baxter–Sagart (2014): *mə-ru n̥ang-s

Liu Gengsheng
- Traditional Chinese: 劉更生
- Simplified Chinese: 刘更生
Transcriptions
Standard Mandarin
- Hanyu Pinyin: Liú Gēngshēng
- Wade–Giles: Liu Kêng-shêng
Yue: Cantonese
- Jyutping: Lau4 Gang1 Sang1

Courtesy Name
- Chinese: 子政
Transcriptions
Standard Mandarin
- Hanyu Pinyin: Zǐzhèng
- Wade–Giles: Tzŭ-chêng
Yue: Cantonese
- Jyutping: Zi1 Zing3

Liu Xiang (77–6 BCE), born Liu Gengsheng, courtesy name Zizheng, was a Chinese astronomer, historian, librarian, poet, politician, and writer of the Western Han dynasty. Among his polymathic scholarly specialties were history, literary bibliography, and astronomy. He is particularly well known for his bibliographic work in cataloging and editing the extensive imperial library.

== Life ==
Liu Gengsheng was born in Xuzhou. He was a fourth-generation descendant of Liu Jiao, the brother of the Han dynasty founder Liu Bang, so Liu Xiang was a member of the ruling dynastic clan (the Liu family). Liu Xiang's father ranked as a marquess. Liu Xiang's son, Liu Xin, would continue the scholarly tradition of his father and his relative Liu An (the Prince of Huainan). Liu Xiang's brother Liu Anmin was the ancestor of the Liu Song dynasty founder Liu Yu.

By the beginning of Emperor Yuan's reign, Liu Xiang was a member of a group of Confucian officials, including Xiao Wangzhi, who wished to limit the power of the emperor's female family members relatives' clans, the Shi and the Xu. He ended up on the losing side of a power struggle between the powerful eunuch's Hong Gong and Shi Xian. Briefly imprisoned, Liu Xiang was terminated from his official position, and he received no new appointments to the office for the next fifteen years.

The succession of Emperor Cheng to the imperial throne was accompanied by a realignment of power among the various factions involved in government, and Liu Xiang was able to revive his official prospects. In 26 BCE, at the command of the emperor, Liu Xiang spent much of the rest of the 20-odd years of his life engaged in the massive bibliographic work of organizing the imperial library. This work was assisted by his son, Liu Xin, who finally completed the task after his father's death.

== Human nature ==
In comparison with Mencius, who considered human nature good, and Xunzi, who considered human nature bad, Han dynasty poet Yang Xiong is known for considering human nature "mixed". Liu Xiang can be compared with Yang Xiong, considering human nature mixed.

== Works ==
Liu compiled the first catalogue of the imperial library, the Abstracts (別錄, Bielu), and is the first known editor of the Classic of Mountains and Seas (Shanhaijing), which was finished by his son. Liu also edited collections of stories and biographies, including the Strategies of the Warring States (Zhanguoce), the New Prefaces (新序, Xinxu), the Garden of Stories (說苑, Shuoyuan), and the Biographies of Exemplary Women (Lienüzhuan). He has long erroneously been credited with compiling the Biographies of the Immortals (Liexian Zhuan), a collection of Taoist hagiographies and hymns.

Liu Xiang was also a poet. He is credited with the "Nine Laments" ("Jiu Tan") that appears in the Songs of Chu.

== See also ==
- Confucian classics
- Guodian Chu Slips
- Liu An
- Science and technology of the Han dynasty
- Sima Qian
- Sima Tan
