= All flesh is grass =

Phrase from the Book of Isaiah

All flesh is grass (Hebrew: כָּל־הַבָּשָׂ֣ר חָצִ֔יר kol-habbāsār ḥāṣīr) is a phrase found in the Old Testament book of Isaiah, chapter 40, verses 6–8. The English text in King James Version is as follows:

^{6} The voice said, Cry.

And he said, What shall I cry?

All flesh is grass,

and all the goodliness thereof is as the flower of the field:

^{7} The grass withereth, the flower fadeth:

because the spirit of the Lord bloweth upon it:
surely the people is grass.

^{8} The grass withereth, the flower fadeth:

but the word of our God shall stand for ever.

A more modern text, English Standard Version, reads:

^{6} A voice says, “Cry!”

And I said, “What shall I cry?”

All flesh is grass,

and all its beauty is like the flower of the field.

^{7} The grass withers, the flower fades

when the breath of the Lord blows on it;
surely the people are grass.

^{8} The grass withers, the flower fades,

but the word of our God will stand forever.

== Analysis ==
In the New Testament the phrase reoccurs in the First Epistle of Peter (see 1 Peter 1:24; Greek: πᾶσα σὰρξ ὡς χόρτος, pasa sarx hōs chortos). It was a commonly used epitaph, frequently found for example on old ledger stones and monuments in churches in 17th century England. The phrase is interpreted to mean that human life is transitory ('impotent, perishing, limited').

== Uses ==
It has been used in various works, including:

Year	Title	Creator	Type	Notes	Ref
c. 1570	King Edward VI and the Pope	Unknown	Painting	Inscribed on the pope's chest	
1599	The Shoemakers' Holiday	Thomas Dekker	Play		
1852	The Old Nurses Story	Elizabeth Gaskell	Short story	"Flesh is grass, they do say..."	
1855	Leaves of Grass	Walt Whitman	Poetry with prosaic introduction		
1865-1868	"Denn alles Fleisch es ist wie Gras"	Johannes Brahms	Choral composition	The second movement of the German Requiem, used as text	
1886	"Arithmetic on the Frontier"	Rudyard Kipling	Poem	Used in the first stanza	
1889 -	En vänlig grönskas rika dräkt	Carl David af Wirsén	Hymn		
Mid to late 1800s	"All Flesh is Grass"	Christina Rossetti	Poem		
1921-1923	The Good Soldier Švejk and His Fortunes in the World War	Jaroslav Hašek	Novel	The volunteer Marek recites it to Švejk	
1931	"Difficulties of a Statesman"	T. S. Eliot	Poem		
1938	The Code of the Woosters	PG Wodehouse	Novel	Quoted by Bertie Wooster	
1939	"Ten Songs"	W. H. Auden	Poem	Used in the third stanza of the ninth poem	
1965	All Flesh is Grass	Clifford D. Simak	Novel		
1972	The Bird of Night	Susan Hill	Novel		
1980	Heaven's Gate	Michael Cimino (writer/director)	Film	John Hurt's character Billy Irvine mutters it to himself	
1985	"War Photographer"	Carol Ann Duffy	Poem	It describes the sights seen in war photographs	
1985	The Handmaid's Tale	Margaret Atwood	Novel	In "Waiting Room: Chapter 8," Aunt Lydia references it incorrectly as "all flesh is weak"	
1994	Cracker	Ted Whitehead (writer)	TV show	The phrase appears in the episode "The Big Crunch"	
1996	"6ix"	The Lemonheads	Song	On the album Car Button Cloth	
2001	All Flesh Is Grass	Madder Mortem	Album		
2004	All flesh is Grass: Pleasures & Promises of Pasture Farming	Gene Logsdon	Nonfiction book		
2006	The Omnivore's Dilemma	Michael Pollan	Nonfiction book		
2014	"Soldier of God"	Ken Theriot (Musician)	Song	The phrase appears in the third verse	
2020	"All Flesh Is Grass"	Una McCormack	Novel	A Doctor Who companion	

== See also ==
- Swords into ploughshares
- Straw dog
