= Mercury (Madder Mortem album) =

Studio album by Madder Mortem
- Released: 8 February 1999
- Recorded: August – 29 September 1998, X-Ray Studios
- Genre: Gothic metal, doom metal
- Length: 51:52
- Label: Misanthropy Records
- Producer: Madder Mortem

Madder Mortem chronology
Misty Sleep (1997)	Mercury (1999)	All Flesh is Grass (2001)

Professional ratings
Review scores
Source	Rating
Sputnikmusic	3.5/5 stars

Mercury is the debut studio album by the Norwegian heavy metal band Madder Mortem. The members involved on this release left shortly after, leaving only BP and Agnete M. Kirkevaag. The music is described as "dreamy" with folk elements. Following this release, the band's music took an extreme turn towards heavier elements.

== Track listing ==
No.	Title	Length
1.	"Undertow"	6:02
2.	"Under Another Moon"	6:00
3.	"He Who Longed for the Stars"	5:50
4.	"These Mortal Sins"	5:15
5.	"The Grinding Silence"	5:28
6.	"Loss"	3:45
7.	"Remnants"	5:37
8.	"Misty Sleep"	6:25
9.	"Convertion"	7:31

== Personnel ==
Madder Mortem

- Agnete M. Kirkevaag – lead vocals
- BP M. Kirkevaag – guitars, synth, backing vocals
- Christian Ruud – guitars, backing vocals
- Boye Nyberg – bass
- Sigurd Nielsen – drums, percussion

Additional musicians

- Synth and programming by Henning Ramseth except on "Under Another Moon" by BP M. Kirkevaag
- Synth arrangements by Henning Ramseth and Madder Mortem

Production

- Produced by Madder Mortem
- Engineered by Fridtjof A. Lindeman and Fredrik Darum
- Mixed by Fridtjof A. Lindeman and Madder Mortem
- Mastering by Tom Kvålsvoll at Strype Audio
