= Chinese elephants expedition =

Migration and return of Asian elephants in China

Chinese Elephants Expedition
- Date: March 2020 - August 2021
- Location: Yunnan, China
- Participants: 14 Asian elephants
- Outcome: Elephants returned to their original sanctuary after a 1300 km journey
- Built temporary roads, installed electric fences, set up traps, deployed police officers and vehicles, and monitored the elephants with drones.

In March 2020, a group of 14 Asian elephants left their habitat in Pu'er City in the southeastern province of Yunnan, China. The elephants were reported as far south as Menghai County, Xishuangbanna Dai Autonomous Prefecture. After 17 months, they returned to their original sanctuary after a journey of 1300 km in early August 2021. These elephants were the center of attention of the Chinese people and worldwide.

== Safety measures ==
Chinese authorities also set up an emergency committee to ensure the elephants return home safely. For the safe return, the committee has built temporary roads for the elephants, electric fences have been installed, and traps have been set up at various places to keep them on track. They also deployed more than 25,000 police officers to provide food for the 14 elephants and to ensure the safety of residents in their paths, and more than 1,500 vehicles were also earmarked. A force of 360 people in 76 vehicles and nine drones monitored the elephants.

David Attenborough covered the herd migration in Netflix's 2023 documentary Our Planet II, providing visual documentation and education of the migration and the effort to keep them safe.

== See also ==
- Elephants in ancient China
- List of individual elephants
