= Dogs in ancient China =

Dogs (Canis lupus familiaris), known in Classical Chinese as quan (Chinese: 犬; pinyin: quǎn; Wade–Giles: ch'üan), played an important role in ancient Chinese society.

== Domestication ==
Remains of dogs and pigs have been found in the oldest Neolithic settlements of the Yangshao (circa 4000 BC) and Hemudu (circa 5000 BC) cultures. Canine remains similar to the Dingo have been found in some early graves excavated in northern China.

Tests on neolithic dog bones show similarities between dogs from this era and modern-day Japanese dogs, especially the Shiba Inu.

== Dogs as ceremonial sacrifice ==
According to Bruno Schindler, the origin of using dogs as sacrificial animals dates back to a primitive cult in honour of a dog-shaped god of vegetation whose worship later became amalgamated with that of Shang Di, the reigning deity of the Shang pantheon.

Systematic excavation of Shang tombs around Anyang since 1928 have revealed a large number of animal and human sacrifices. There was hardly a tomb or a building consecrated without the sacrifice of a dog. At one site, Xiaotong, the bones of a total of 825 human victims, 15 horses, 10 oxen, 18 sheep and 35 dogs were unearthed. Dogs were usually buried wrapped in reed mats and sometimes in lacquer coffins. Small bells with clappers, called ling (鈴) have sometimes been found attached to the necks of dogs or horses. The fact that alone among domestic animals dogs and horses were buried demonstrates the importance of these two animals to ancient Chinese society. It's reflected in an idiom passed down to modern times: "to serve like a dog or a horse." (犬馬之勞).

Shang oracle bones mention questions concerning the whereabouts of lost dogs. They also refer to the ning (寧) rite during which a dog was dismembered to placate the four winds or honour the four directions. This sacrifice was carried over into Zhou times. The Erya records a custom to dismember a dog to "bring the four winds to a halt." (止風). Other ceremonies involving dogs are mentioned in the Zhou li. In the nan (難) sacrifice to drive away pestilence, a dog was dismembered and his remains buried in front of the main gates of the capital. The ba (軷) sacrifice to ward off evil required the Son of Heaven, riding in a jade chariot, to crush a dog under the wheels of his carriage. The character ba gives a clue as to how the ceremony took place. It is written with the radical for chariot (車) and a phonetic element which originally meant an animal whose legs had been bound (发). It was the duty of a specially appointed official to supply a dog of one colour and without blemishes for the sacrifice. The blood of dogs was used for the swearing of covenants between nobles.

Towards the late fifth century BC, surrogates began to be used for sacrifice in lieu of real dogs. The Dao De Jing mentions the use of straw dogs as a metaphor:

Heaven and earth are ruthless, and treat the myriad creatures as straw dogs;
the sage is ruthless, and treats the people as straw dogs.

However, the practice of burying actual dogs by no means died out. One Zhongshan royal mausoleum, for example, included two hunting dogs with gold and silver neck rings.

Later, clay figurines of dogs were buried in tombs. Large quantities of these sculptures have been unearthed from the Han dynasty onwards. Most show sickle-shaped tails not unlike the modern Shiba Inu or Akita Inu.

== Dogs as food ==
Dog butcher (狗屠) was a specific (and lowly-regarded) profession. They are called "idle and untrustworthy" by Fan Ye. Dog butchers who rose to prominence include the strongman Zhu Hai, the musician Gao Jianli, and general Fan Kuai (all circa third century BC).

The ancient word for dog meat was ran (肰). The Old Chinese character meaning "to burn" or "to roast" showed dog meat on top of a fire (然).

The Bencao Gangmu (Compendium of Materia Medica) divides dogs into three categories: the tianquan (田犬) or watchdog, the feiquan (吠犬) or barking dog, and the shi-quan (食犬) or edible dog. With the exception of the liver every part of the animal was considered edible.

At the banquets of feudal lords a dish of dog's broth and glutinous rice was considered a great delicacy. For summer, dried fish fried in pungent dog's fat was thought to be cooling. When dog's meat was prepared as sacrificial meat it had first to be marinated in vinegar and pepper.

== Dogs for hunting ==
Dogs were associated with hunting from very early times. Many words for hunting in the Chinese language are written with the radical for dog - for example, lie (獵: hunt), shou (狩: winter hunt), huo (獲: bird hunt).

The Shang kings recognised "Dog Officers" (犬) who were involved in hunting in a specific area beyond the royal domain. One oracle bone records: "If the king joins with Qin, the Dog Officer at Cheng, there will be no regrets and he will have no disasters."

There is one reference to dogs in the Shi Jing, China's earliest anthology of poetry:

Swiftly runs the crafty hare,
But it is caught by the hound.

In the Warring States period, the kingdoms of Han and Yan were thought to produce the best hunting dogs.

Because of their importance and numbers, there was at Shanglin an "inspector of kennels" (狗監; goujian) who oversaw the raising and training of the hunting dogs for the Han court.

There is pictorial evidence from early Han tomb tiles of large dogs with collars in the typical pointing position - the body in a slightly crouching position, neck extended horizontally, and one forepaw being under and raised several inches above ground - standing before a flock of geese in flight and several running deer.

== Cultural perceptions ==
It is clear from the role of dogs in ceremony and as food, as well from the presence of dog figurines in Ancient Chinese tombs, that they were held in some esteem.

Book of Rites, ch.4, quotes Confucius ordering his disciple to perform the respectful burial for his dog and saying:

"I have heard that it is best not to throw away old and frayed carriage curtains because one can use them to bury horses; that it is best not to throw away old and frayed carriage canopies because one can use them to bury dogs. I am poor and have no carriage canopy. So use my mat when you put the dog into his grave. Be sure not to let his head get stuck in the mud."

Nevertheless, classical literature usually qualified dogs as hui treacherous, jiao crafty and si restless. The Quanrong (犬戎), literally "Dog nomad-tribe", were enemies of the settled civilizations from the time of the Zhou dynasty onwards. The tribe claimed descendancy from two large white dogs and worshipped a totem in their honor.

The word for dog was sometimes used in human names. Sima Xiangru, for example, had the nickname Quǎnzǐ (犬子), meaning "Dog-son".

The term Quǎner (犬兒, meaning [My] dog of a son) has been used as a term of self-cheapening deference in reference to one's own son, mostly in front of others as a form of respect. Such practice is now considered obsolete, as modern Chinese customs have largely eschewed the practice of self-cheapening deference altogether. The term is now also used to refer to puppies, which has led to confusion when people used the term in its original, ancient context.

=== Dogs in legend ===
According to ancient folk legends, solar eclipses take place because dogs in heaven eat the sun. In order to save the sun from demise, ancient people formed the habit of beating drums and gongs at the critical moment to drive away the dogs.

=== Stories about loyal dogs ===
The Savior with a Tail (Chinese: 的尾救主/Dewěijiùzhǔ), is a novel originating from the Northern Song dynasty. In the novel, a man named Hualong loved to shoot and hunt. His dog, nicknamed 'Tail' (的尾/Dewěi) follows him every time he goes hunting. One day, Hualong went to the riverside and a python wound itself around him, suffocating him. 'Tail' bit the snake to death, but his master lay stiffly on the ground unconsciously. 'Tail' barked restlessly around Hualong for a while, before running back home. Hualong's family was surprised by the dog's behavior, so they followed the dog to the river. Seeing Hualong unconscious on the ground, his family rushed him back home, where he woke up only two days later. 'Tail' did not eat for two days until his master had woken up. Since then, Hualong has cherished dogs as if they were his kin.

The "Tomb for the Righteous Dog" (义犬冢) is a tomb made for dogs who died in order to save their owners. During the Three Kingdoms period, there was a man named Li Xinchun, and his family had a dog named "Heilong" (黑龙, Black Dragon). Li loved this dog very much, allowing it to go wherever he went and eating with it.

"One day, Li was drunk outside the city and fell asleep in the grass on the side of the road. It happened that Zheng Xia, the Governor (上太守), came out to hunt, and seeing that the grass in the field was long, sent someone to set the grass on fire in order to scare out the animals. The place where Li lay was just downwind. When Heilong saw the fire coming, he dragged Li's clothes in its teeth, but Li didn't move. There was a small stream near where Li was lying, only thirty or fifty steps away from him. Heilong ran into the stream and soaked his body with water, then ran back to where Li was lying, wetting him with the water from the dog's body. In consequence, Li survived the fire, but Heilong was so tired that he died beside his owner. When Li woke up and found his hair wet and Heilong dead beside him, he very surprised by what had happened. He saw the traces of the fire, and then burst into tears. The Governor Zheng Xia heard of the news, felt very sorry for the dog and said: "A dog's repayment of kindness is greater than man's. Man does not know (true) kindness; how can he compare to a dog?" He asked people to prepare coffin clothes for Heilong's burial. Today, Jinan has the Tomb of the Righteous Dog, which is more than ten Zhàng high." This story was recorded in the Soushenji.

== See also ==
- Dogs in Chinese mythology
- Elephants in ancient China
- Rhinoceroses in ancient China
