= Eight Ways =

Studio album by Madder Mortem
- Released: 11 May 2009
- Genre: Progressive metal, gothic metal, symphonic metal, doom metal, alternative metal
- Length: 64:17
- Label: Peaceville

Madder Mortem chronology
Desiderata (2006)	Eight Ways (2009)	Where Dream and Day Collide (2010)

Eight Ways is the fifth studio album by Norwegian metal band Madder Mortem, released on 16 June 2009. It was their second CD release on Peaceville Records.

== Track listing ==
No.	Title	Length
1.	"Formaldehyde"	5:24
2.	"The Little Things"	4:59
3.	"Armour"	5:01
4.	"Resolution"	6:25
5.	"A Different Kind of Hell"	5:12
6.	"The Riddle Wants to Be"	4:08
7.	"Where Dream & Day Collide"	5:44
8.	"The Flesh, the Blood & the Man"	4:32
9.	"Get That Monster Out of Here"	5:37
10.	"Life, Lust & Liberty"	4:19
11.	"All I Know"	3:48
12.	"The Eighth Wave"	9:14

== Personnel ==
Madder Mortem

- Agnete M. Kirkevaag – lead vocals
- BP M. Kirkevaag – guitars, mandolin, backing vocals
- Odd E. Ebbesen – guitars
- Tormod L. Moseng – bass guitar, double bass, backing vocals
- Mads Solås – drums, percussion, backing vocals

Production

- Produced by Madder Mortem
- Engineered by BP M. Kirkevaag
- Mixed by BP M. Kirkevaag
- Mastering – Maor Appelbaum at Maor Appelbaum Mastering, California

== Reception ==
Professional ratings
Review scores
Source	Rating
About.com	4/5 stars
Chronicles of Chaos	9/10 stars
Metalrage.com	85/100
Metalunderground.com	4/5

Metalunderground.com has rated the album 4 out of 5, "Excellent":

"Their fifth studio album, 'Eight Ways,' is the type of album that takes a few listens to sink in, but once it does, the result is one of deep satisfaction.

[...] The band has a tendency to jam a lot of content into one song, and with the average song length being over five minutes, the first listen may not sink in all the sharp turns taken with the songwriting. The transition from smooth jazz to harsh guitar tones and screaming vocals may prove to be jarring in the beginning, but as time goes on, everything starts to click and the album begins to make sense, piece by piece, minute by minute."
