= Where Dream and Day Collide =

EP by Madder Mortem
- Released: 10 May 2010
- Recorded: Loppa and Huseby, January 2010
- Genre: Progressive metal, progressive rock
- Length: 21:05
- Label: Peaceville

Madder Mortem chronology
Eight Ways (2009)	Where Dream and Day Collide (2010)	Red in Tooth and Claw (2016)

Professional ratings
Review scores
Source	Rating
Sputnikmusic	3.5/5 stars

Where Dream and Day Collide is an EP by Norwegian metal band Madder Mortem, released on 10 May 2010 on Peaceville Records. The EP contains three brand new songs, along with the single and album versions of the title track, taken from the 2009 release Eight Ways.

== Track listing ==
No.	Title	Length
1.	"Where Dream & Day Collide (Single Edit version)"	3:43
2.	"Jitterheart"	3:54
3.	"The Purest Strain"	3:30
4.	"Quietude"	4:18
5.	"Where Dream and Day Collide (Album Version)"	5:40

== Personnel ==
Madder Mortem

- Agnete M. Kirkevaag – lead vocals
- BP M. Kirkevaag – guitars, backing vocals
- Odd E. Ebbesen – guitars
- Tormod L. Moseng – bass guitar, double bass
- Mads Solås – drums

Production

- Produced by BP M. Kirkevaag and Madder Mortem
- Engineered by BP M. Kirkevaag
- Mixed by BP M. Kirkevaag
- Mastering by Peter In de Betou
