= Marrow (album) =

Studio album by Madder Mortem
- Released: September 21, 2018
- Recorded: 2017–2018
- Genres: Avant-garde metal, alternative metal, gothic metal, progressive metal
- Label: Dark Essence Records

Madder Mortem chronology
Red in Tooth and Claw (2016)	Marrow (2018)	Old Eyes, New Heart (2024)

Marrow is the seventh studio album by Norwegian metal band Madder Mortem, released on 21 September 2018 on Dark Essence Records.

== Track listing ==
No.	Title	Length
1.	"Untethered"	1:18
2.	"Liberator"	3:59
3.	"Moonlight Over Silver White"	5:43
4.	"Until You Return"	6:40
5.	"My Will Be Done"	4:13
6.	"Far From Home"	4:52
7.	"Marrow"	6:19
8.	"White Snow, Red Shadows"	4:16
9.	"Stumble On"	6:34
10.	"Waiting To Fall"	9:03
11.	"Tethered"	0:30

== Personnel ==
Madder Mortem

- Agnete M. Kirkevaag – vocals
- BP M. Kirkevaag – guitars, percussion and vocals
- Anders Langberg – guitars
- Tormod L. Moseng – bass
- Mads Solås – drums, percussion, backing vocals

"Marrow" was composed and recorded with Richard Wikstrand on guitars
Pedal steel guitar on "Until You Return" and "Marrow": Thomas Vik

Production

- Produced by BP M. Kirkevaag and Madder Mortem
- Engineered by BP M. Kirkevaag
- Mixed by BP M. Kirkevaag
- Mastering – Peter in de Betou at Tailor Maid
- Recorded at Skytterhuset and Studio Omnivore

== Reception ==
Agnete M. Kirkevaag's dynamic and immensely powerful vocals, are, as always, at the fore on an album that is more doomy than its predecessor, "Red In Tooth And Claw", as well as being at times both heavier, and catchier. "Marrow" is about "sticking to the essence of yourself. Your ideas, your thoughts, your values".

Angrymetalguy.com rates the album 4.5/5.0:

"With their idiosyncratic sound, an avant-garde mixture of alternative, gothic and progressive metal, and frontwoman Agnete Kirkevaag's signature blend of ragged screams and sultry smooth croon, the band is nearing 20 years of existence, yet never gained a large audience. 2016's excellent Red in Tooth and Claw finally started making some waves for the quintet, upon which they now hope to capitalize with Marrow, an album constructed around the central theme of inner strength."
