= Hymn to the Fallen (Jiu Ge) =

Classical Chinese poem

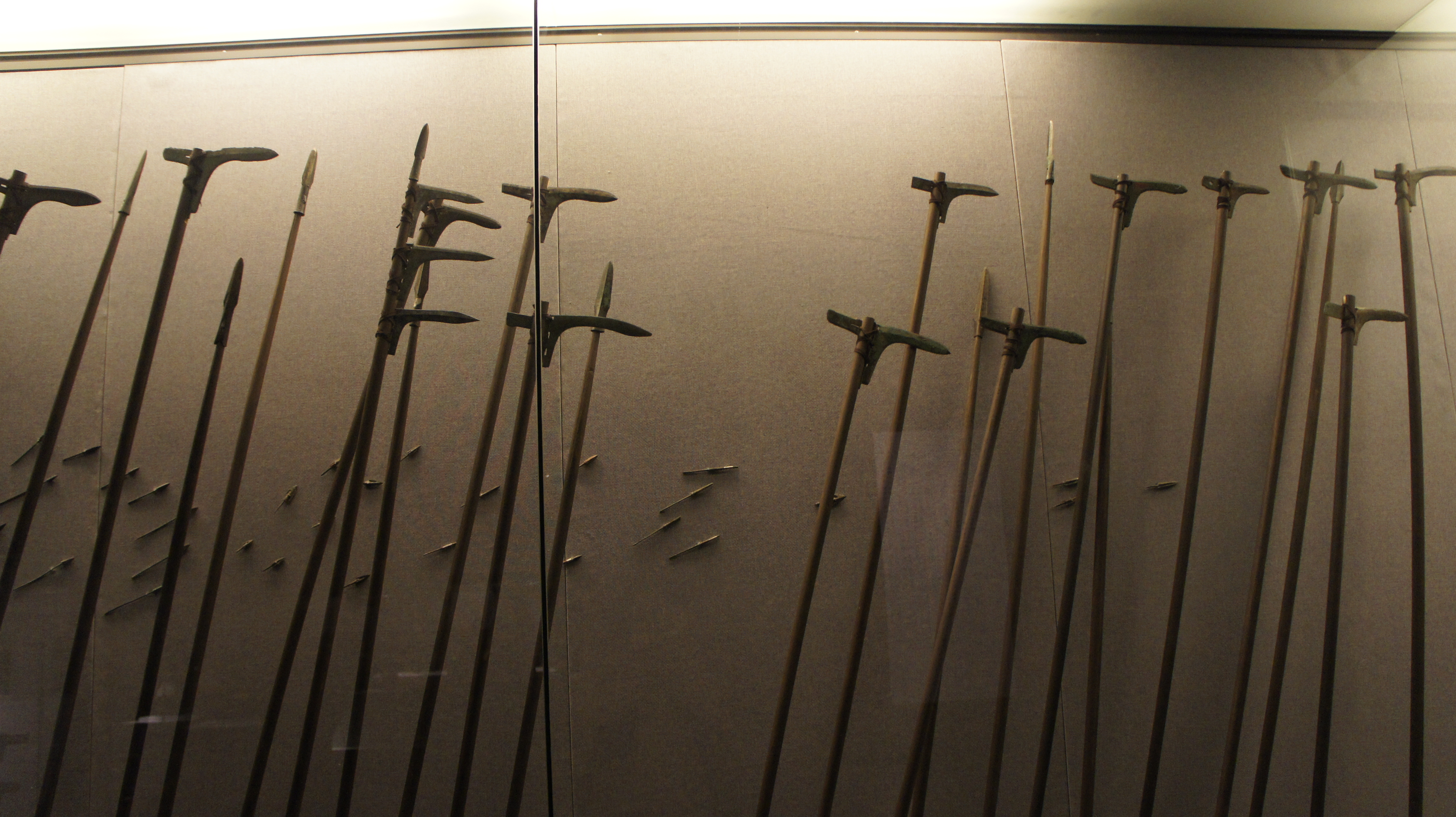
A collection of typical ge and crossbow bolts from the Warring States

"Hymn to the Fallen" (traditional Chinese: 國殤; simplified Chinese: 国殇; pinyin: Guó shāng; lit. 'National casualties') is a Classical Chinese poem which has been preserved in the Jiu Ge section of the ancient Chinese poetry anthology, Chu Ci.

Despite the "nine" in the title, the number of these pieces actually consists of eleven separate songs, or elegies. The verses appear to represent shamanistic dramatic practices of the Yangzi River valley area involving the invocation of divine beings and seeking their blessings through courtship.

The lyrics are part of a religious drama performance, however the lack of stage directions or indications of who is supposed to be singing at any one time or whether some of the lines represent lines for a chorus makes an accurate reconstruction of how the drama is to be performed uncertain. There are internal textual clues such as spectacular costumes for the performers, and an extensive orchestra.

Although not precisely dated, "Hymn to the Fallen" dates from the end of the late the Warring States period (221 BCE), with possible revisions in the Han dynasty, particularly during the reign of Han Wudi, during 141 to 87 BCE.

The poem has been translated into English by David Hawkes as "Hymn to the Fallen", while the literal meaning of "Guó Shāng" is a hymn to soldiers killed in war. Guó (國) means the "state", "kingdom", or "nation". Shāng (殤) means to "die young". Put together, the title refers to those who meet death in the course of fighting for their country. David Hawkes describes it as "surely one of the most beautiful laments for fallen soldiers in any language".

== Meter ==
The meter is a regular seven-character verse, with three characters separated by the exclamatory particle "兮" followed by three more characters, each composing a half line, for a total of nine double lines totaling 126 characters.(國殤)

== Background ==
The historical background of the "Hymn to the Fallen" poem involves the ancient type of warfare practiced in ancient China. Included are references to arms and weapons, ancient states or areas, and the mixed use of chariots in warfare. A good historical example of this type of contest is the "Battle of Yanling", which features similar characteristics and problems experienced by participants in this type of fighting, such as greatly elevated mortality rates for both horses and humans. As is generally the case of Chu ci poems, it is concerned with events or matters relating to Chu, whether considered as a political state or as or pertaining to the area in which that state was located. Thus "Hymn to the Fallen" refers to a battle (whether real or imaginary) involving Chu warriors, although the characteristic warfare described would similar to that of the early Han dynasty.

== Chu and the Warring States ==
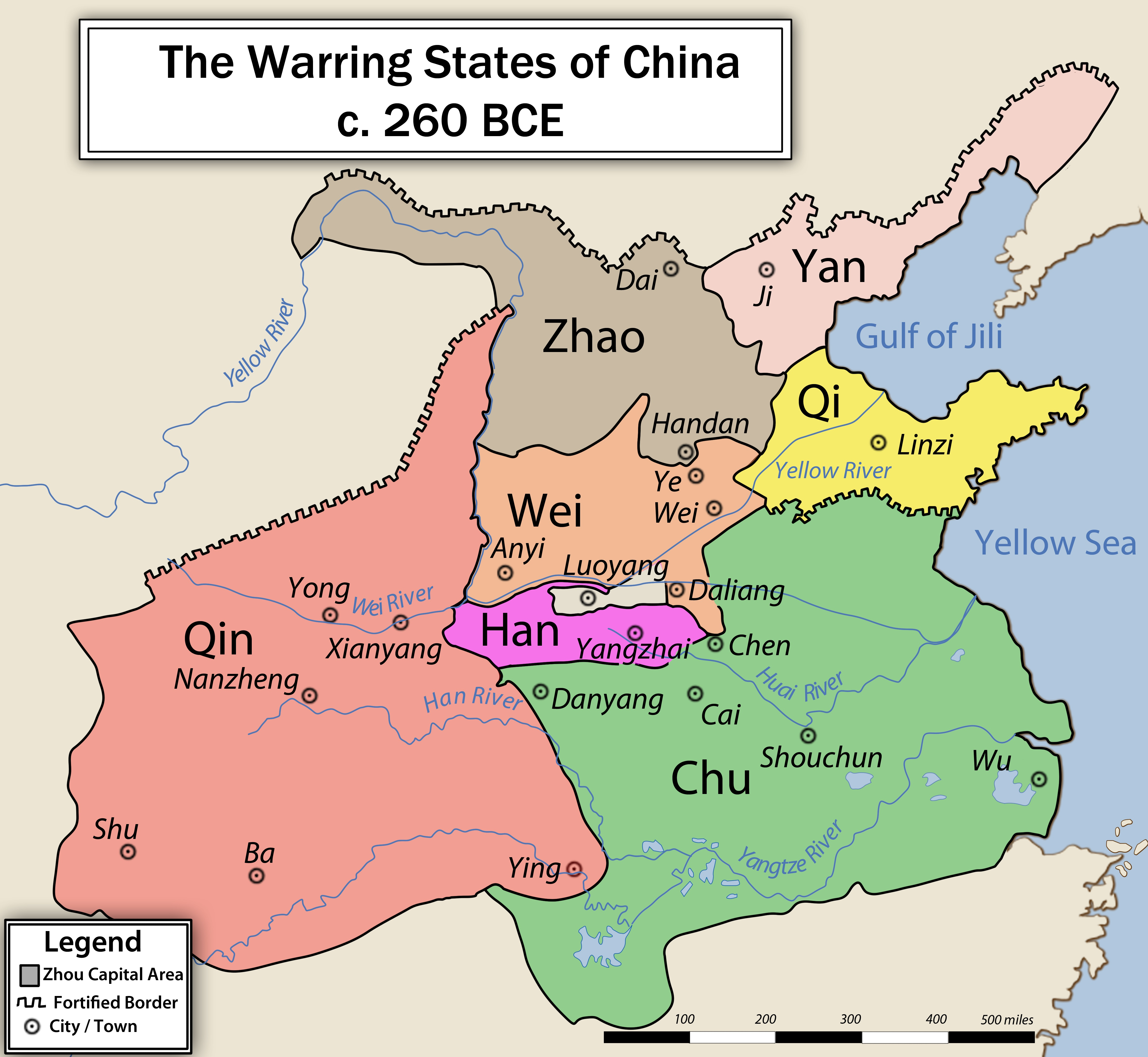
Map of Warring States, 260BCE, showing Chu (楚), having incorporated Wu (吳), bordered by Qin (秦)

The state of Chu was a kingdom dating back to early 8th century BCE. During its existence there was frequent armed violence; indeed, the latter part of its existence is known for that reason as Warring States period (beginning early Fifth Century BCE). This was a period characterized by struggles between the different kingdoms for supremacy until their final political consolidation by Qin in 221 BCE. (Chu was annexed in 223 BCE.) During the Warring States era, warfare developed in ways characteristic to what is depicted in "Hymn to the Fallen". There was also often factional violence within the states, often related. The Confucian philosopher Xun Zi (Shun Kuang) comments on this in his early Third Century BCE book known eponymously as the Xunzi or Works of Xun Zi:

The soldiers of Chu were equipped with armour made of sharkskin and rhinoceros hide hard as metal or stone, and pikes of Nanyang steel that could sting a man like a wasp or scorpion. They were so light and mobile that they seemed to move about like the wind. Yet at Chui-sha the Chu army was all but destroyed and its commander Tang Mie [...] was killed. Zhuang Jiao led a rising in the capital and the country split in several parts. This was not because they lacked strong armour and sharp weapons but because they did not know how to use them.

== Weapons, armor, and equipment ==
"Hymn to the Fallen" specifically mentions several types of weapon and other characteristics of early Chinese warfare and culture. Specific understanding of this type of warfare and the cultural background enhances specific understanding of the poem; this includes specific weapons, armor, vehicles, and methodology of war.

=== Ge ===
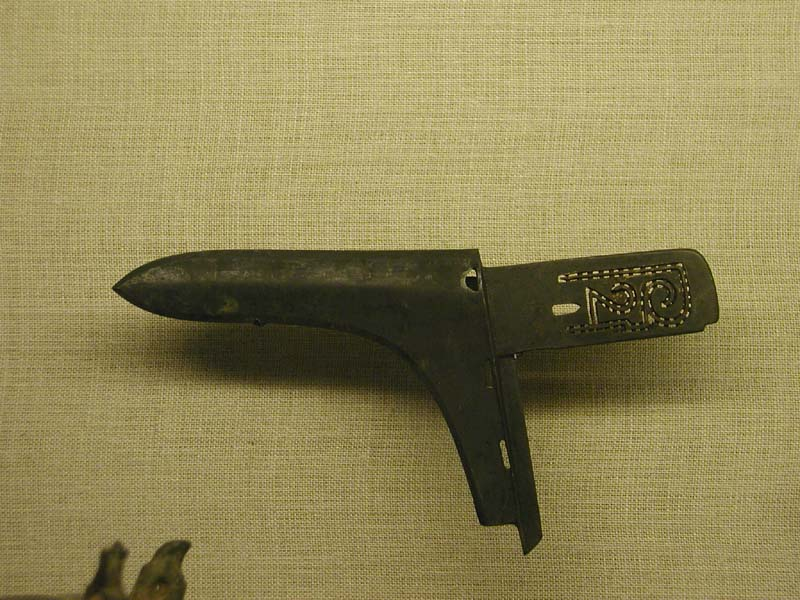
Head of ge (戈) from the Warring states period. Typically the wood pole did not survive. Nor did the tassels affixed to the slot seen here.

One weapon specifically-mentioned in "Hymn to the Fallen" is the variously-translated ge (Chinese: 戈; pinyin: gē; Wade–Giles: ko. (Note that the two Chinese words and characters for ge -- weapon and song -- are distinct.) Translations include dagger-axe, pike, halberd, and others (dagger-axe is descriptive, the others tend to be the names of European relatives. This long, polearm weapon generally consists of a metal blade or blades and sometimes a metal point hafted at the end of a long pole, generally of wood. Eventually these ge were mass-produced, the spear tip on the end became more common and the ji became commonly used (Chinese: 戟). The ge was known in China from earliest history through the time period when "Hymn to the Fallen" was written. Ge made in Wu (吳戈) or produced from steel made there were especially renowned, and specifically mentioned in "Hymn to the Fallen".

=== Bow and Arrow/Bolt ===
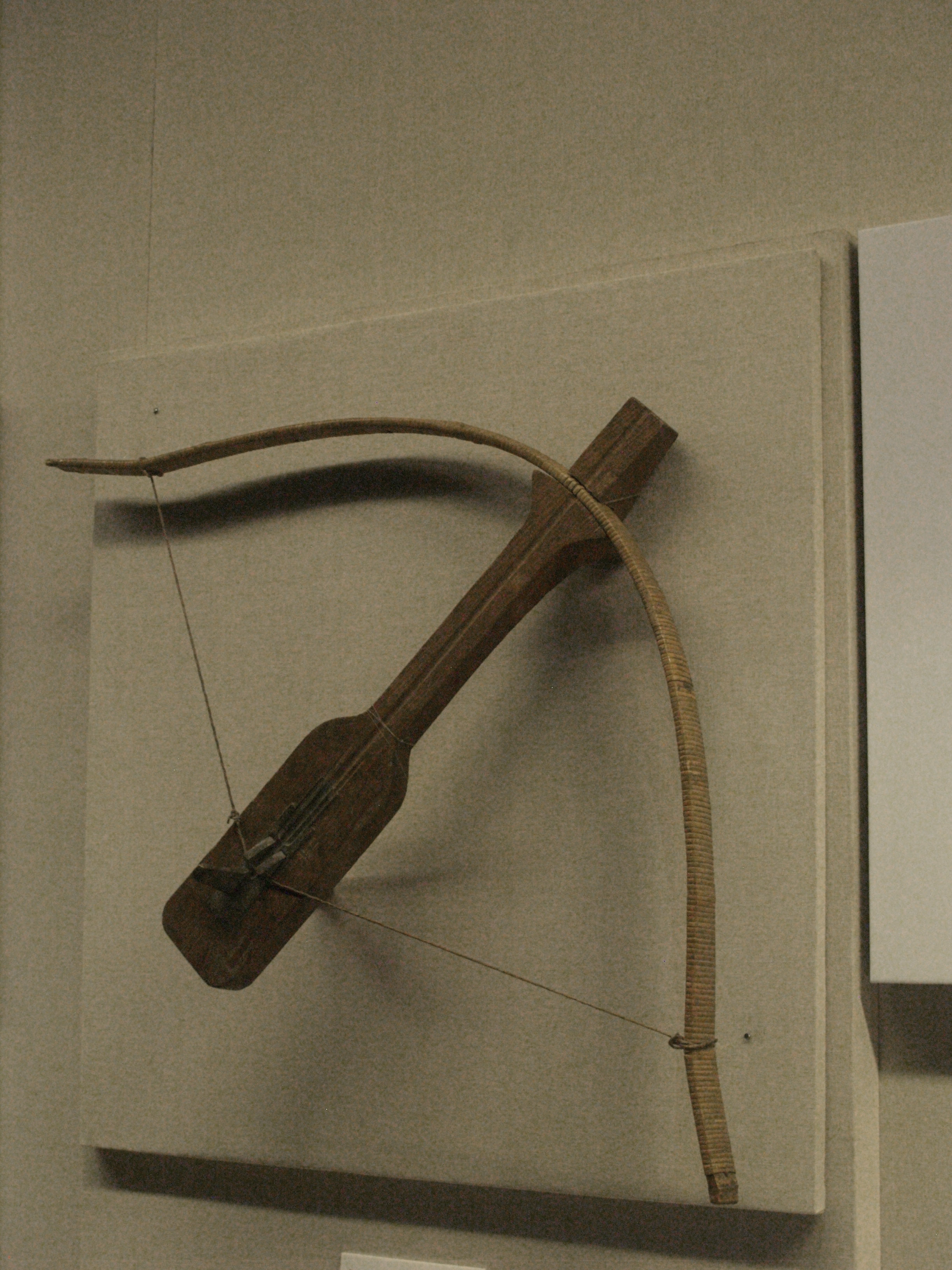
Qin crossbow

Another weapon which specified is the bow, which is a ranged weapon which launches a projectile, usually referred to as an arrow in the case of a long bow and as a quarrel or bolt in the case of a cross bow, in both cases possessed of a deadly metal tip. In either case, the relevance to the poem is the way in which these weapon is used in ancient Chinese warfare: shot by an archer from the ground or from chariots generally in large numbers, battles frequently began with massed archery as soon as the armies were in range of each other. Often shot ballistically, the arrows/bolts would come down from on high, accelerated by the force of gravity into a deadly rain from above. However, at close quarters the archer was no match for the wielder of the ge, so a typical battle would begin with volleys of arrows/bolts, followed by hand-to-hand fighting. Both the longbow and crossbow were known to the author of "Hymn to the Fallen" and the only specification made is to "Qin bows (秦弓)". The state of Qin was noted for its bows.

=== Armor ===
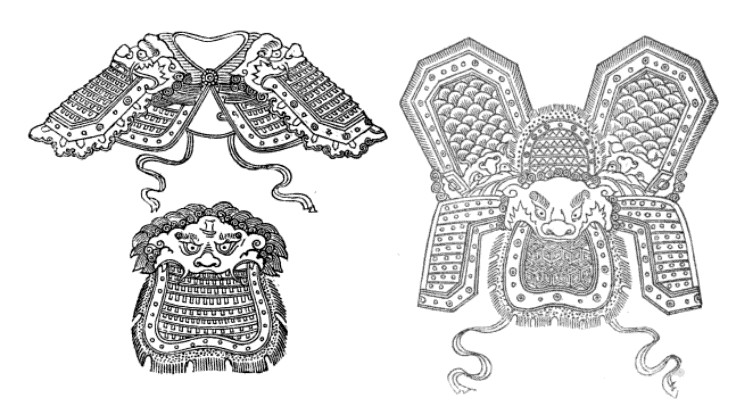
Drawing of rhinoceros hide and buffalo hide armour (犀甲)

Rhinoceros hide armor (犀甲) is specifically mentioned in "Hymn to the Fallen". Rhinoceroses were relatively common in southern China at the time of the composition of "Hymn to the Fallen", and Chu is noted for historical use of rhino skin armor for war. "[t]he soldiers of Chu were equipped with armour made of sharkskin and rhinoceros hide as hard as metal or stone, and with pikes of Nanyang steel that could sting a man like a wasp or a scorpion". The lamellar armour favoured by Chu was generally constructed of many small pieces intricately sewn together, resulting in a type of armor providing a certain amount of defensive protection, while at the same time being reasonably light and flexible.

=== Chariots ===
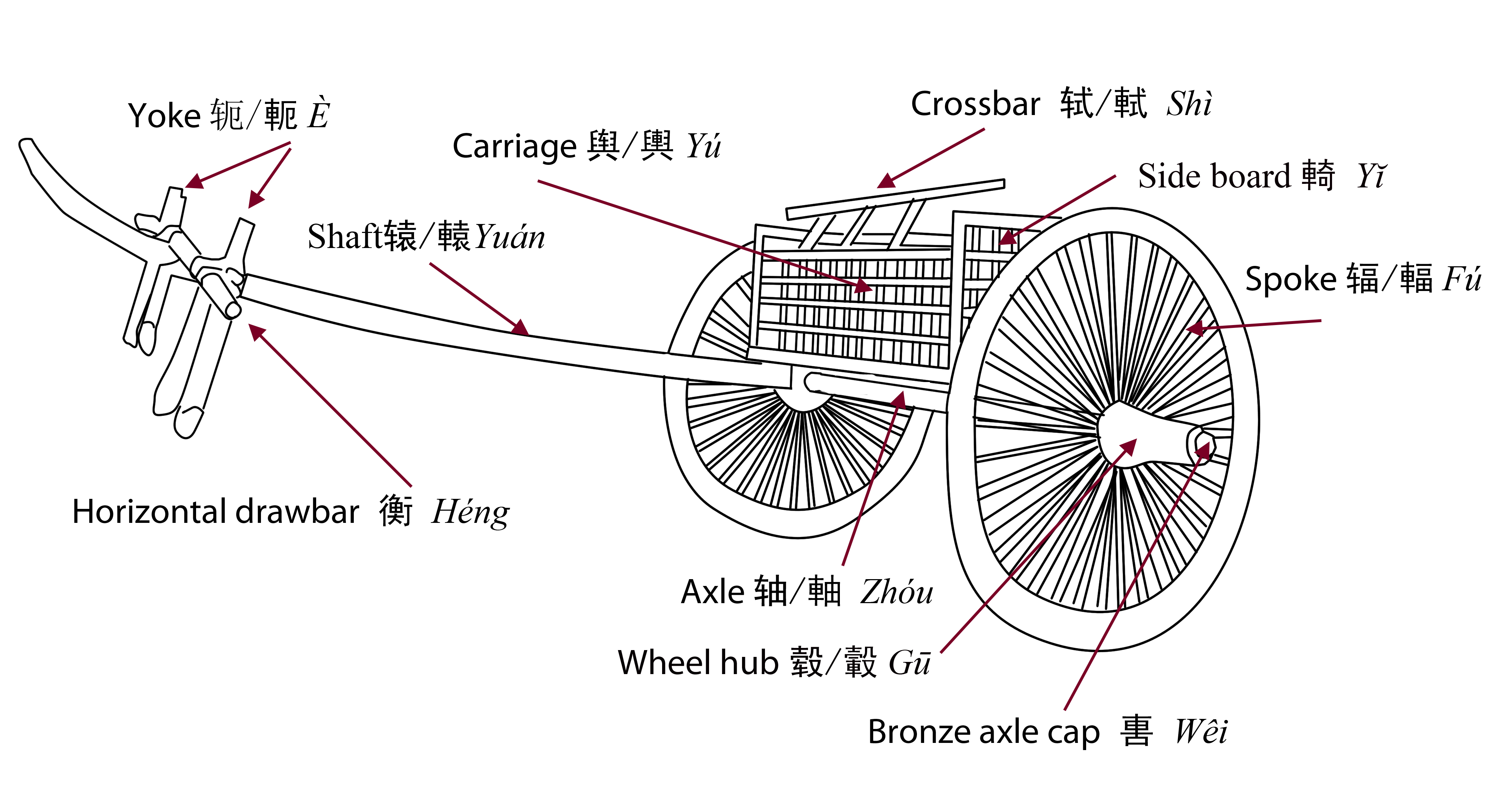
Schematic of typical chariot (車)

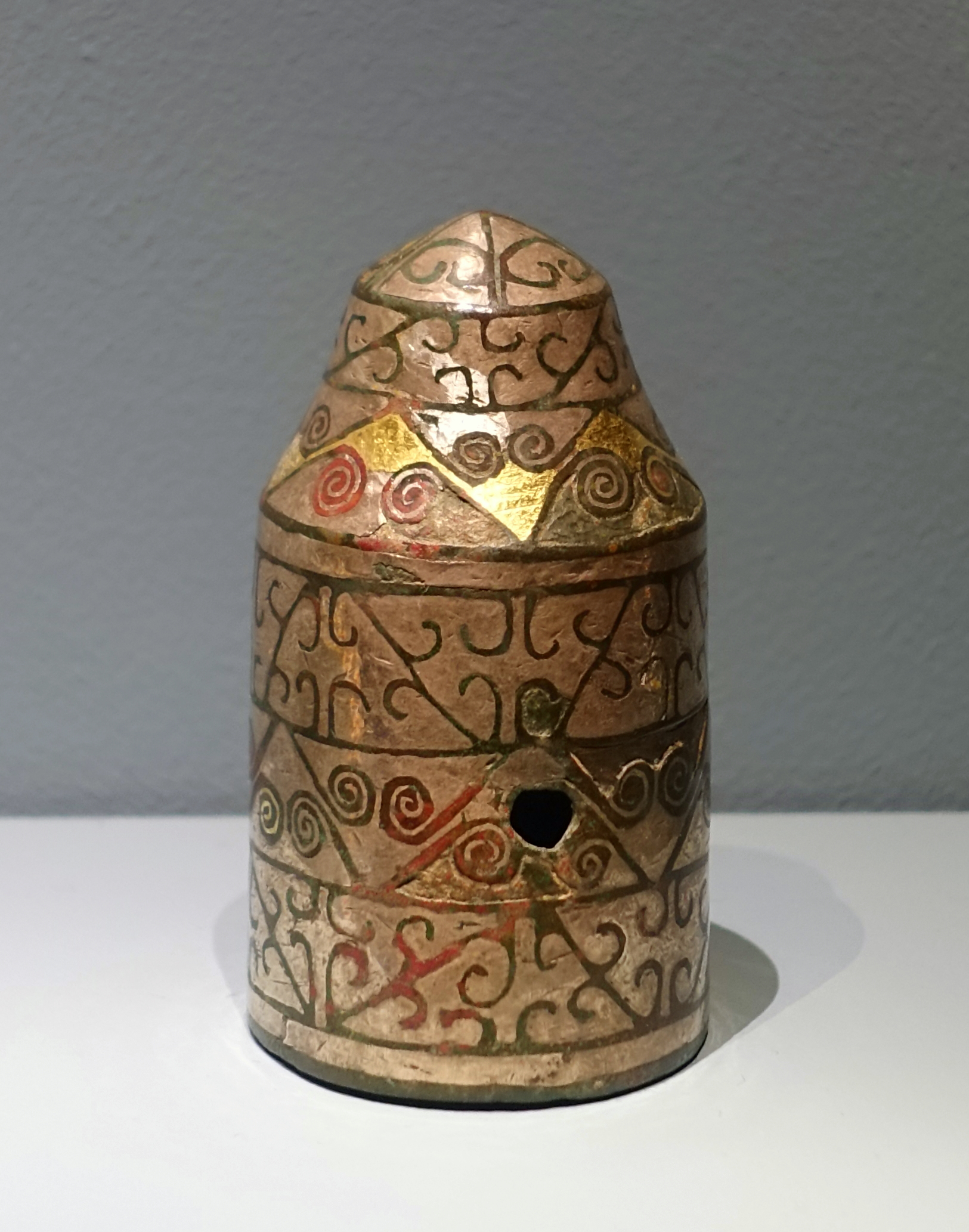
Chariot wheel hub/cap (轂), China, Warring States period, 475-221 BC, bronze inlaid with silver and gold

The horse and chariot were key components of the type of warfare described in this verse, and had been for a long time. Chariots in ancient China were generally light, two-wheeled vehicles pulled by two to four horses (or ponies), yoked together by one or two poles, to which the outside horses were attached by traces. Typically, on the left side of the chariot rode the charioteer who controlled the horses, generally armed only with a short sword. Beside him would be one (or more) archers armed with bows and a short sword. The short swords were in case an enemy jumped on the chariot or the personnel were forced into melee combat; however, yet of such construction as they be not so bulky that they might interfere with main duties onboard. Typically, protecting the right side was a soldier armed with the ge, a lengthy and lethal hand weapon. In battle, the tactical aim for chariots was generally to avoid direct contact with the enemy, and instead inflict damage at a relatively safe distance, charging towards the enemy ranks, discharging a volley of arrows/bolts, and wheeling away to a safe distance. Then, repeat. If the chariots got stuck in mud, hemmed in, or the wheels damaged or otherwise disabled they were likely to be quite at a disadvantage if attacked by foot soldiers armed with ge, swords, axes, or other melee weapons, especially if the foot soldiers maintained disciplined formations.

=== Military organization ===
Military discipline was key component in the warfare depicted in "Hymn to the Fallen"; that is, the ordering of the army so as to be most effective in tactics and responsive to command. Coordination of chariot forces and infantry was generally critical to success. The chariots were vulnerable to infantry attack at close quarters and so generally would be provided with infantry support. Infantry was also vulnerable to chariots if they were able to maintain a distance allowing ranged attacks but avoiding melee, so generally chariot accompaniment was required. Communications, including rallying points and identifying forces was often done through the use of banners, sometimes adorned with feathers (jīng, 旌), as is mentioned in "Hymn to the Fallen". Also mentioned is the use of musical instruments to lead on the troops and to coordinate their actions. The use of musical instruments to control movements of the army was an old practice. Attack (charge), regroup, retreat, and similar maneuvers could all be sounded.

== Spiritual and Religious Phenomena ==
Various spiritual and religious cultural phenomena are encountered in the "Hymn to the Fallen" poem. This includes belief in an after life, with survival of soul or spirit beyond the death of the body and the presence of various supernal or earthly powers, particularly a Heavenly Lord (Tian) and a Martial Deity (Wu).

=== Vital Soul (Hunpo) ===
In ancient China, there was a belief that some part of a person would survive the death of the body, a belief continued and developed over time. There is some uncertainty in the beliefs around the time that the "Hymn to the Fallen" was written, in late Warring States/early Han dynasty.

=== Tian and Wu ===
In ancient China, there was a belief in supernal and earthly powers of deities and spirits. This includes a belief in Tian, a celestial deity with great influence on Earth and a belief in a spiritual being named Wu as a personified spirit of warfare, comparable to Ares or Mars.

== Poem ==
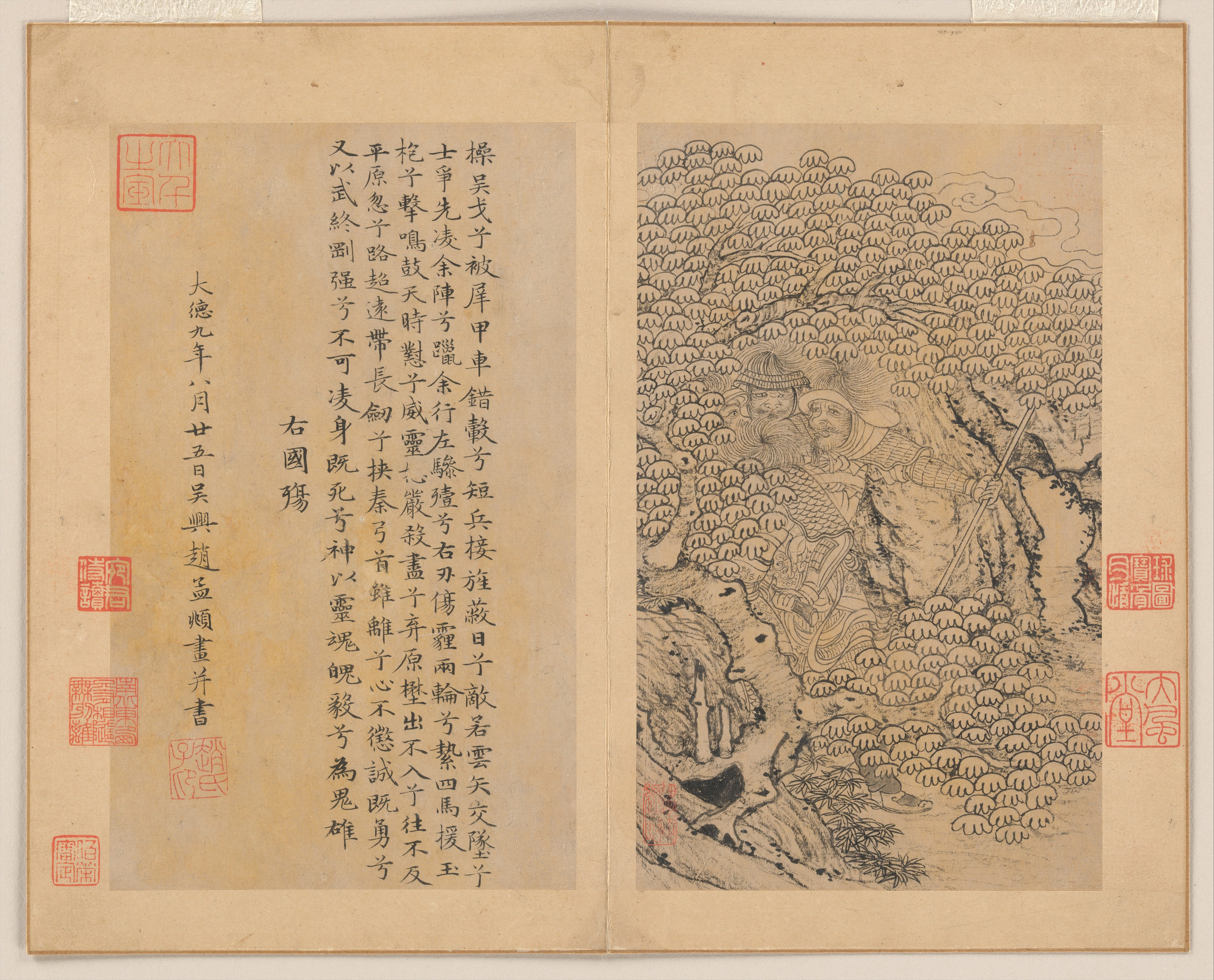
"Illustrated "Hymn to the Fallen". Unknown artist after Zhao Mengfu. Characters in traditional vertical, right-to-left columns.

Standard Chinese version (Traditional characters but written in the modern way, left-to-right and horizontally):

國殤

操吳戈兮被犀甲，車錯轂兮短兵接。
旌蔽日兮敵若雲，矢交墜兮士爭先。
凌余陣兮躐余行，左驂殪兮右刃傷。
霾兩輪兮縶四馬，援玉枹兮擊鳴鼓。
天時懟兮威靈怒，嚴殺盡兮棄原野。
出不入兮往不反，平原忽兮路超遠。
帶長劍兮挾秦弓，首身離兮心不懲。
誠既勇兮又以武，終剛強兮不可凌。
身既死兮神以靈，魂魄毅兮為鬼雄。

The poem is translated as "Battle" by Arthur Waley (1918, in A Hundred and Seventy Chinese Poems):

BATTLE
....

“We grasp our battle-spears: we don our breast-plates of hide.
The axles of our chariots touch: our short swords meet.
Standards obscure the sun: the foe roll up like clouds.
Arrows fall thick: the warriors press forward.
They menace our ranks: they break our line.
The left-hand trace-horse is dead: the one on the right is smitten.
The fallen horses block our wheels: they impede the yoke-horses!”

They grasp their jade drum-sticks: they beat the sounding drums.
Heaven decrees their fall: the dread Powers are angry.

The warriors are all dead: they lie on the moor-field.
They issued but shall not enter: they went but shall not return.
The plains are flat and wide: the way home is long.

Their swords lie beside them: their black bows, in their hand.
Though their limbs were torn, their hearts could not be repressed.
They were more than brave: they were inspired with the spirit of
“Wu.”[2]
Steadfast to the end, they could not be daunted.
Their bodies were stricken, but their souls have taken Immortality--
Captains among the ghosts, heroes among the dead.

[2] I.e., military genius.

== See also ==
- Chariots in ancient China
- Chu ci: general information about the anthology
- Chu (state): one of the Warring States. Protagonist of this poem. One of the last of the Warring States to succumb during the process of the Qin unification, Chu having along the way absorbed other states. A region during Han dynasty.
- Crossbow: a projectile weapon. A bow with rifle-like stock.
- Dagger-axe: a pole melee weapon, capable of hacking or stabbing.
- Hunpo: part or parts of humans which survive death of the body
- Jiu Bian: the Nine Changes section of the Chuci. Perhaps another aspect of a common liturgy, incorporating the musical .
- Jiu Ge: the Nine Songs. Section of Chuci anthology in which "Hymn to the Fallen" appears.
- Jiu Zhang: the Nine Pieces. Section of Chuci anthology. Perhaps from a common liturgy complementary to the Nine Songs derived from dance material.
- History of crossbows: more about crossbows
- List of Chuci contents: index of the anthology
- Taiyi: deity
- Qin (state): known for their bows. One of the Warring States, later would defeat Chu in the process of unifying China
- Qu Yuan: associated author
- Rhinoceroses in ancient China: formerly much more prevalent. Sometimes the hides were used for armor.
- Wang Yi (librarian): Han dynasty editor, critic, and commentator. Also wrote some Chuci material.
- Wu (武): information about this word on Wiktionary
- Wu (state): (吳) coastal state bordering Chu, known for steel fabrication. At a time independent, but later subsumed by Chu.
- Xuanwu (god): deity
