= Straw dog =

Chinese phrase

Straw dogs or grass dogs (simplified Chinese: 刍狗; traditional Chinese: 芻狗; pinyin: chú gǒu), were figures of dogs made out of straw or grass, used as ceremonial objects in ancient China, as a substitute for real sacrifice of living dogs - Chú gǒu - and the phrase has been used figuratively to refer to anything discarded after use.

== Use as a metaphor ==
=== Tao Te Ching ===
Chapter 5 of the Tao Te Ching makes use of the phrase chu gou (芻狗) to compare living beings to straw dogs. This metaphor is used to explain the non-humanity (不仁 bu ren) of Heaven and Earth:

天地不仁
以萬物為芻狗
聖人不仁
以百姓為芻狗

Translation:

Heaven and Earth are not humane.
They regard all things as straw dogs.
The sage is not humane.
He regards all people as straw dogs. (Note: "All people" here translates 百姓 lit. "hundred families"; "all things" translates 萬物 lit. "myriad things")

However, some translators prefer to interpret this phrase as two separate words, "straw" (芻) and "dogs" (狗), rather than together, as "straw dogs" (芻狗).

This verse is usually interpreted as an expression of the Taoist rejection of the principle of ren (仁), one of the Five Constant Virtues in Confucianism, variously translated as "humanity", "benevolence", "partiality", or "kind acts". Su Zhe's commentary on the verse explains: "Heaven and Earth are not partial. They do not kill living things out of cruelty or give them birth out of kindness. We do the same when we make straw dogs to use in sacrifices. We dress them up and put them on the altar, but not because we love them. And when the ceremony is over, we throw them into the street, but not because we hate them."

=== Zhuangzi ===
Another Taoist text, the Zhuangzi provides a more detailed description for the treatment of the straw dogs in its 14th chapter, "The Turnings of Heaven":

Before the grass-dogs [芻狗 chu gou] are set forth (at the sacrifice), they are deposited in a box or basket, and wrapt up with elegantly embroidered cloths, while the representative of the dead and the officer of prayer prepare themselves by fasting to present them. After they have been set forth, however, passers-by trample on their heads and backs, and the grass-cutters take and burn them in cooking. That is all they are good for.

The image of the straw dogs is again used to criticise Confucianism, as the Zhuangzi goes on to compare Confucius, in his insistence upon the ancient rites, to a fool who attempts to reconstitute the trampled straw dogs, "replace them in the box or basket", and "wrap them up with embroidered cloths".

== See also ==
- All flesh is grass — similar Old Testament verse
- Paper tiger
- Stone lion
- Straw Dogs (1971 film) — named after the metaphor
