= Red in Tooth and Claw =

Studio album by Madder Mortem
- Released: 28 October 2016
- Genre: Avant-garde metal, alternative metal, gothic metal, doom metal, progressive metal
- Length: 50:54
- Label: Dark Essence Records

Madder Mortem chronology
Where Dream and Day Collide (2010)	Red in Tooth and Claw (2016)	Marrow (2018)

Red in Tooth and Claw is the sixth studio album by Norwegian metal band Madder Mortem, released on 28 October 2016 on Dark Essence Records. It is the genre-defying quintet's first new full-length album since 2009.

== Track listing ==
No.	Title	Length
1.	"Blood on the Sand"	5:22
2.	"If I Could"	5:16
3.	"Fallow Season"	4:12
4.	"Pitfalls"	5:21
5.	"All the Giants Are Dead"	5:12
6.	"Returning to the End of the World"	5:57
7.	"Parasites"	3:13
8.	"Stones for Eyes"	4:24
9.	"The Whole Where Your Heart Belongs"	4:31
10.	"Underdogs"	7:31

== Personnel ==
Madder Mortem

- Agnete M. Kirkevaag – lead vocals
- BP M. Kirkevaag – guitars, mandolin, backing vocals
- Richard Wikstrand – guitars
- Tormod L. Moseng – bass guitar, double bass, backing vocals
- Mads Solås – drums, percussion, backing vocals

Guitars on "Red in Tooth and Claw" performed by BP M. Kirkevaag & Patrick Scantlebury

Production

- Produced by BP M. Kirkevaag and Madder Mortem
- Engineered by BP M. Kirkevaag
- Mixed by BP M. Kirkevaag
- Mastering – Peter In de Betou

== Reception ==
Angrymetalguy.com rates the album 4.0/5.0:

"Madder Mortem's style is not easy to describe succinctly; switching effortlessly from crushing grooves to uncomfortable dissonance to quiet contemplation or soaring beauty, they are experts at manipulating your emotions with their skillful song-craft. The one-two punch of "Blood on the Sand" and "If I Could" that open the record showcase the Madders at their emotive peak, with off-kilter timing and uncomfortable harmonies building towards dramatic releases of tension. Though each runs for over five minutes, the shimmering guitars and arpeggiated bass-lines create a continuous sense of motion meaning that neither seems too long."
