= Elephants in ancient China =

Ancient elephant population

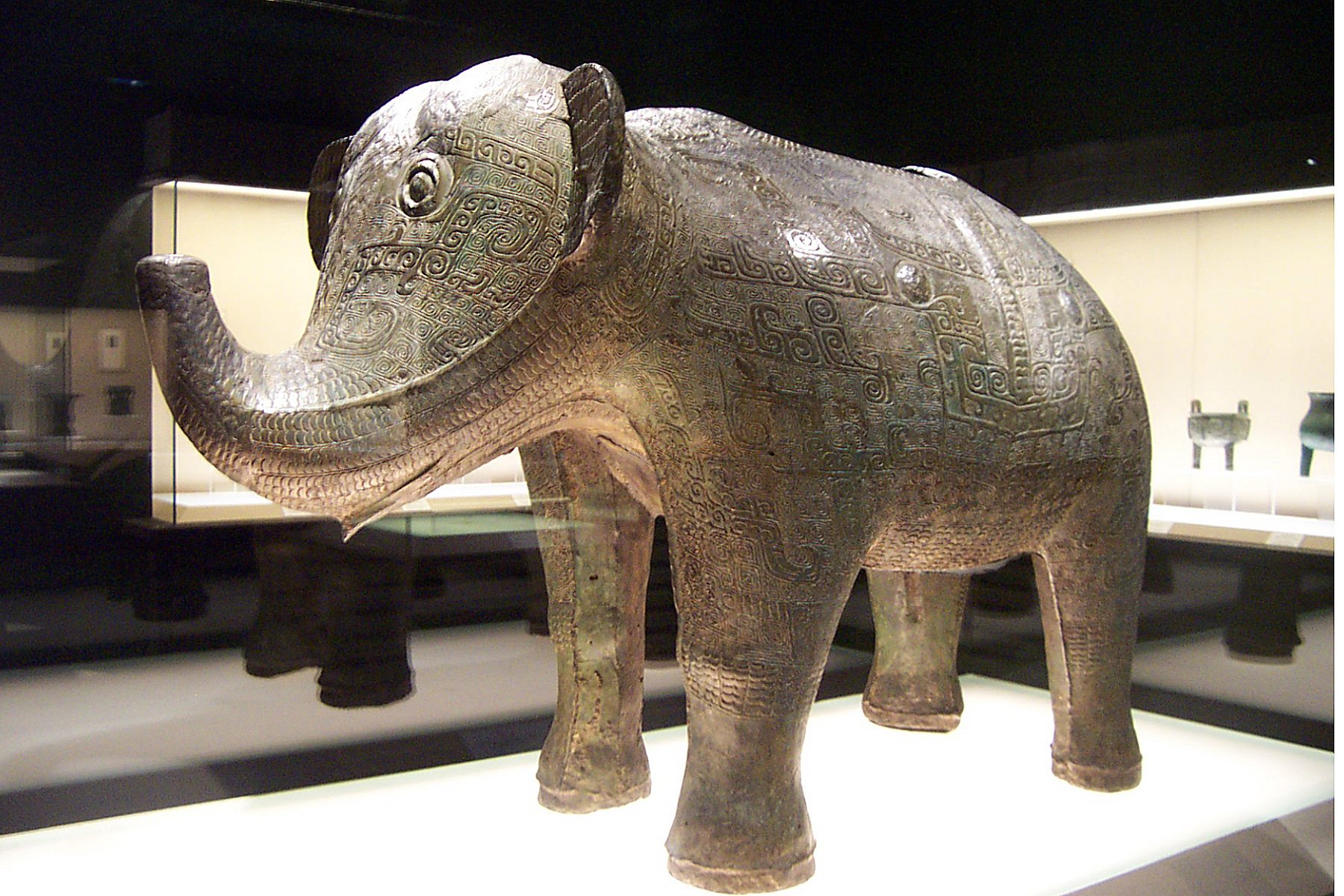
Bronze wine vessel in the form of an elephant

The existence of elephants in ancient China is attested both by archaeological evidence and by depictions in Chinese artwork. Long thought to belong to an extinct subspecies of the Asian elephant named Elephas maximus rubridens, they lived in Central and Southern China before the 14th century BC. They once occurred as far north as Anyang, Henan in Northern China. The elephant is mentioned in the earliest received texts, including the Shijing, Liji, and Zuozhuan. The oracle bone script and bronzeware script glyphs for elephant are pictographic depictions of an animal with a long trunk. Their modern descendant is the regular script character 象 (Standard Modern Chinese, xiàng).

In December 2011, a study by a team of scientists from China reported that the elephant living in China in ancient times (Shang and Zhou dynasties) could not have been a subspecies of the Asian elephant, as previously thought, but probably belonged to the genus Palaeoloxodon. P. namadicus were distributed across Asia, but it is unclear if the mysterious elephants of northern China were remnants of P. namadicus or a unique species of their own. This conclusion was reached after studying remains of Chinese elephant molars and tusks from the Holocene epoch, as well as examining ritual bronzes from the Shang and Zhou dynasties, which all depicted elephants with two 'fingers' on the tip of their trunk (whereas the Indian elephant only has one 'finger'). Fossil elephant experts Victoria Herridge and Adrian Lister disagree with the assignment, stating that the claimed diagnostic dental features are actually contrast artifacts, created due to the low resolution of the figures in the scientific paper, and are not evident in better quality photographs.

Elephants still survived in the southwestern provinces of China after the extinction of the Chinese elephant, but they are of a different subspecies, the Indian elephant (Elephas maximus indicus). A native population of these elephants remains in Xishuangbanna, Yunnan Province.

== Warfare ==
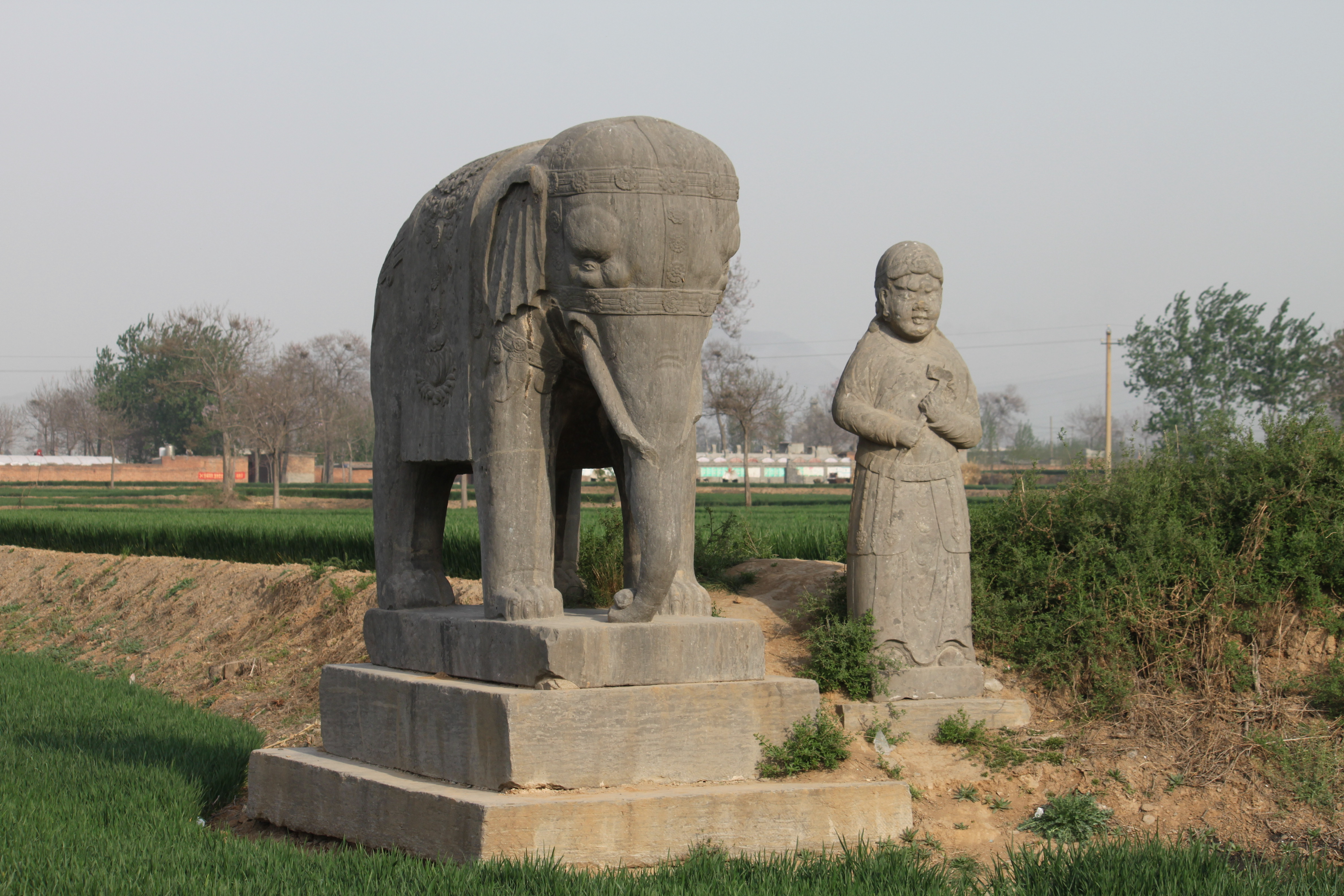
Stone elephant and a soldier at Emperor Zhezong of Song's tomb

Elephants were used for warfare in China by a small handful of southern dynasties. The state of Chu used elephants in 506 BC against Wu by tying torches to their tails and sending them into the ranks of the enemy soldiers, but the attempt failed. In December 554 AD, the Liang dynasty used armoured war elephants, carrying towers, against Western Wei. They were defeated by a volley of arrows. The Southern Han dynasty is the only state in Chinese history to have kept a permanent corps of war elephants. These elephants were able to carry a tower with some 10 people on their backs. They were used successfully during the Han invasion of Ma Chu in 948. In 970, the Song dynasty invaded Southern Han and their crossbowmen readily routed the Han elephants on 23 January 971, during the taking of Shao. That was the last time elephants were used in Chinese warfare.

Chinese armies also faced off against war elephants in Southeast Asia, such as during the Linyi-Champa Campaign (602–605) and Ming–Mong Mao War from 1366 – 1388. In 605, Champa used elephants against the invading army of the Sui dynasty. The Sui army dug pits and lured the elephants into them and shot them with crossbows. The elephants turned back and trampled their own army. During the Mong Mao campaign, the elephants were routed by an assortment of gunpowder projectiles.

== Drastic decline ==
Elephants mostly disappeared from large areas of China primarily due to a focus on maximizing agricultural production. This led to deforestation and habitat loss, ultimately eliminating wild animals, including elephants. In contrast, ancient India (see Indian elephant and Asian elephant) had a more complex land ethic that balanced various priorities, such as economic, recreational, religious, aesthetic and wildlife conservation, which helped preserve elephant populations.

== In popular culture ==
The elephants

The elephant is one of the pieces of the chess-like Chinese board game xiangqi.

== See also ==
- Chinese elephants expedition
- List of individual elephants
- Dogs in ancient China
- Rhinoceroses in ancient China
- Wildlife of China
