= All Flesh Is Grass (album) =

Studio album by Madder Mortem
- Released: 5 March 2001
- Recorded: October 2000
- Genre: Progressive metal, alternative metal
- Length: 47:43
- Label: Century Media
- Producer: Madder Mortem and Pelle Saether

Madder Mortem chronology
| Mercury (1999) | All Flesh Is Grass (2001) | Deadlands (2002) |

Professional ratings
Review scores
| Source | Rating |
|---|---|
| Chronicles of Chaos | 9/10 stars |
| Sputnikmusic | 3.5/5 |

All Flesh Is Grass is the second studio album by Norwegian metal band Madder Mortem, released on 5 March 2001 through Century Media Records. It was recorded in Studio Underground, Västerås, Sweden, in October 2000.

The title refers to the phrase "All flesh is grass", an extract from the Old Testament Book of Isaiah 40:6, meaning that human life is transitory.

== Track listing ==
| No. | Title | Length |
|---|---|---|
| 1. | "Breaker of Worlds" | 6:47 |
| 2. | "To Kill and Kill Again" | 4:34 |
| 3. | "The Cluster Children" | 4:30 |
| 4. | "Ruby Red" | 5:02 |
| 5. | "Head on Pillow" | 0:54 |
| 6. | "Turn the War On" | 5:37 |
| 7. | "Four Chambers" | 2:51 |
| 8. | "Ten Times Defeat" | 6:54 |
| 9. | "Traitor's Mark" (one minute silence from 8:58 to 9:58 before acoustic hidden track) | 10:37 |

== Personnel ==
Madder Mortem

- Agnete M. Kirkevaag – lead vocals
- BP M. Kirkevaag – guitars, percussion, backing vocals
- Eirik Ulvo Langnes – guitars
- Paul Mozart Bjørke – bass, keyboards, backing vocals
- Mads Solås – drums, percussion, backing vocals
- Additional musician: Lennart Glenberg-Eriksson – violin

Production

- Produced by Madder Mortem and Pelle Saether
- Engineered by Pelle Saether and Lars Lindèn
- Mixed by Pelle Saether
- Mastering by Ulf Horbelt at DMS, Marl, Germany
