= Rhinoceroses in ancient China =

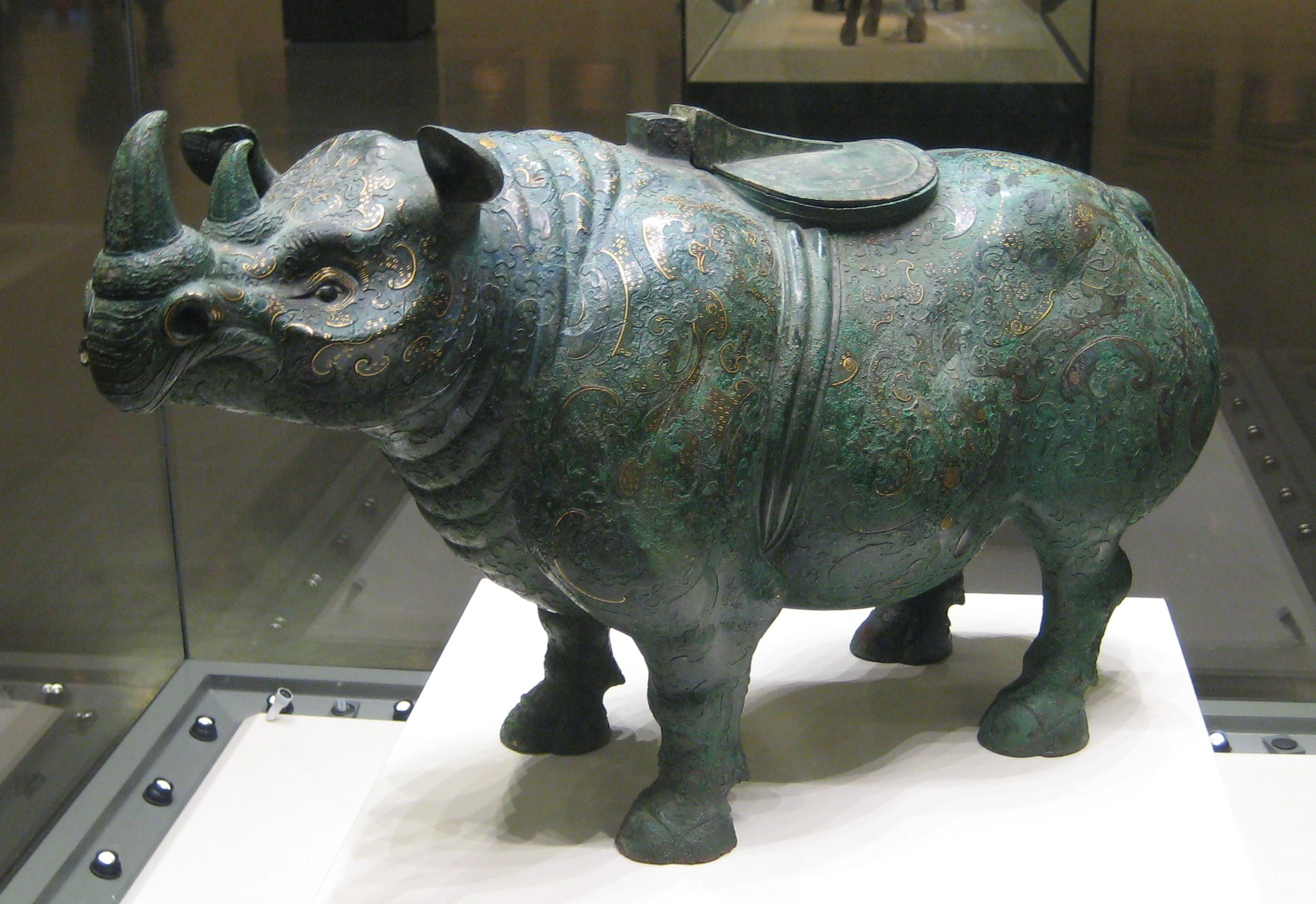
Rhinoceros wine vessel dating to the Western Han (206 BC – AD 9).

The existence of rhinoceroses in ancient China is attested both by archaeological evidence and by references in ancient Chinese literature. Depictions of rhinoceroses in ancient Chinese art are typically very accurate and lifelike, suggesting that they were modelled first-hand by the artist on living rhinoceroses rather than being based on legend or traveller's tales. The two species of rhinoceros that lived in China in ancient times have been identified as the Sumatran rhinoceros (Dicerorhinus sumatrensis) and the Javan rhinoceros (Rhinoceros sondaicus).

== Nomenclature ==
There are two ancient Chinese characters that have been interpreted as meaning 'rhinoceros': xī 犀; and sì 兕 (the former character is used in the modern Chinese word for 'rhinoceros', xīniú 犀牛). In the early 2nd century dictionary, Shuowen Jiezi, the xī is defined as "an ox occurring beyond the southern frontier. It has a horn on its nose and another one on the crown of its head; it resembles a pig"; and the sì (written as 𤉡, a variant of 兕) is defined as being "like a wild ox and dark-colored". In the Erya glossary, probably compiled during the 3rd century BC, the xī is said to resemble a boar, whereas the sì is said to resemble an ox, but the commentary by Guo Pu (276–324) elaborates, stating that the xī is like a water buffalo, but with a large paunch, short legs, three toes on each foot, and three horns on a pig-like head, two on its forehead and one on its nose; and the sì has a single horn. It is evident from these two sources that the xī refers to the two-horned Sumatran rhinoceros, but it is not clear what exactly the sì refers to. Some authorities suppose that the sì refers to the one-horned Javan rhinoceros, and some follow the definition given, for example, in the Tang book Xinxiu Bencao by Su Jing (aka Su Gong, died 674), in the 1037 CE rime dictionary Jiyun, or the Ming dynasty materia medica, Bencao Gangmu, that the sì is the name for a female rhinoceros; on the other hand, many scholars believe that the sì refers to a type of wild buffalo, in particular the extinct short-horned water buffalo, Bubalus mephistopheles, or even that the si may have been used as a name for both the more common buffalo and the rarer rhinoceros.

== Species and distribution ==
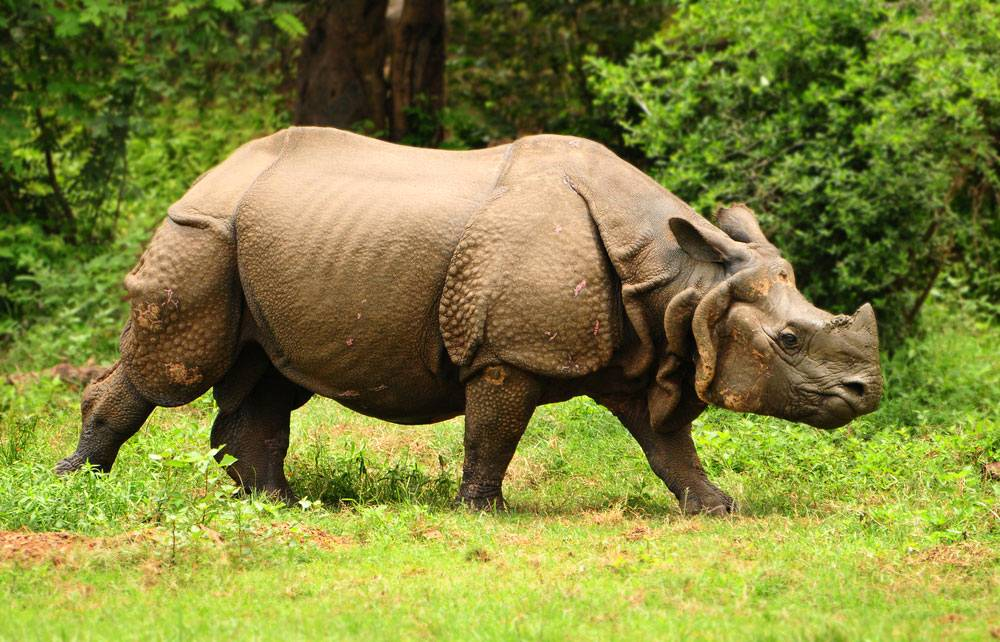
Indian rhinoceros

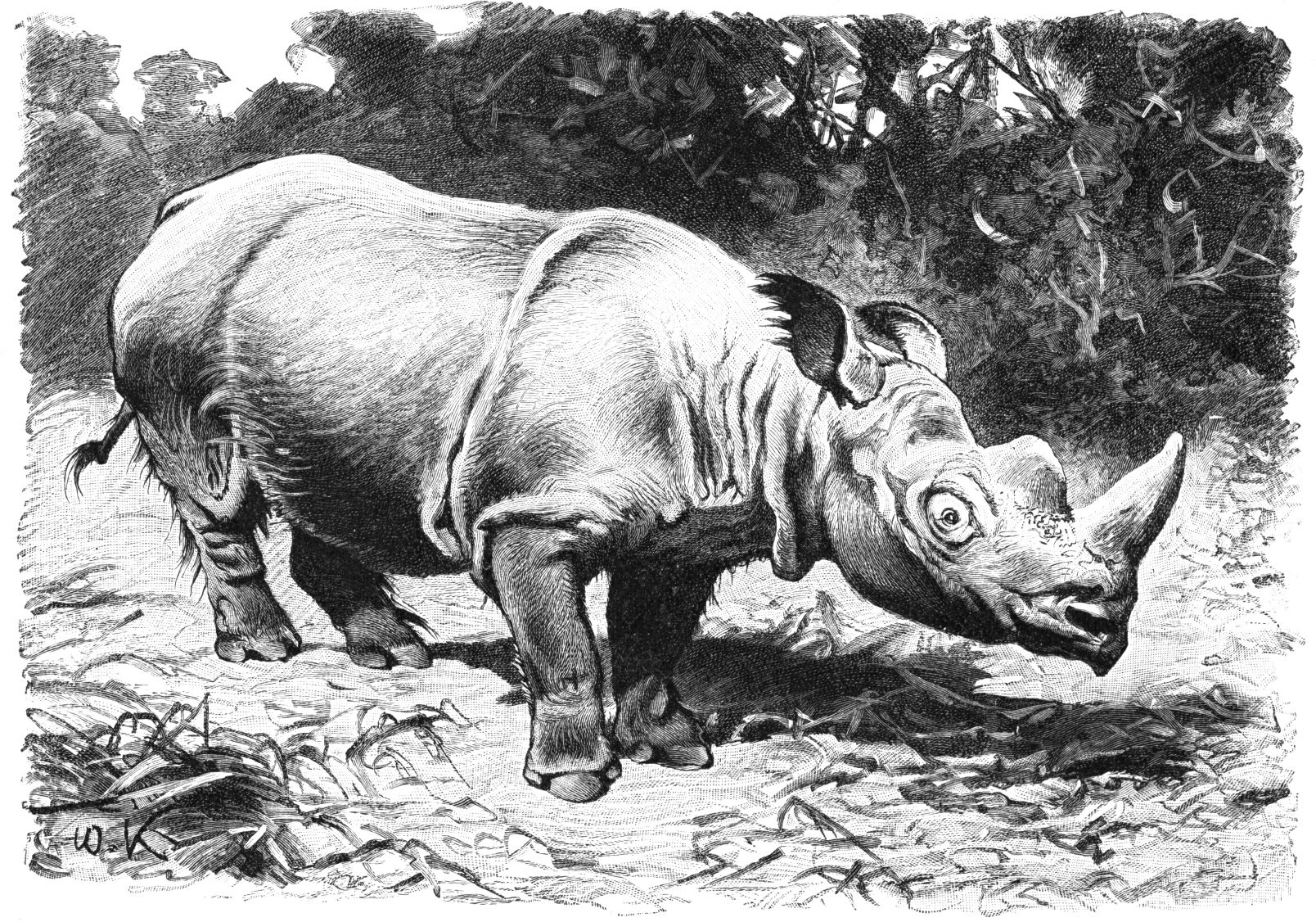
Depiction of the possibly extinct mainland subspecies of the Sumatran rhinoceros, with longer horns than the living subspecies in Sundaland

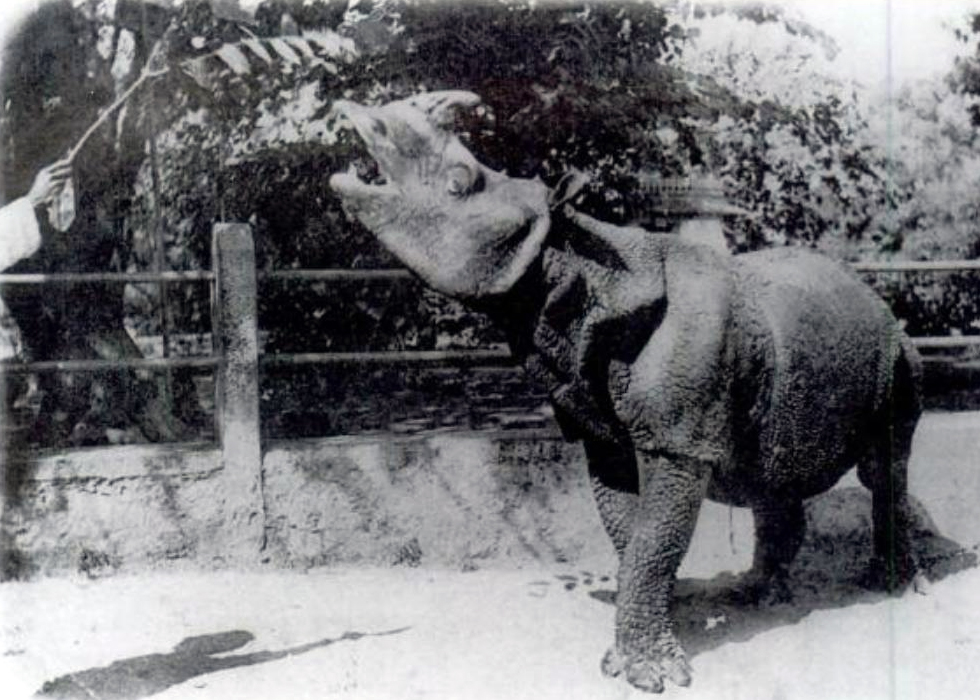
Javan rhinoceros

=== Prehistory ===
During the late Pleistocene (ca. 120,000-10,000 BCE) three extinct species of rhinoceroses lived in China: the woolly rhinoceros (Coelodonta antiquitatis) and Merck's rhinoceros (Stephanorhinus kirchbergensis) in northern China, and Rhinoceros sinensis in lands south of the Yellow River. Of the living species, the Indian rhinoceros (R. unicornis) lived in China only during the early Pleistocene, 2 million years ago, while the Javan rhinoceros (R. sondaicus) and Sumatran rhinoceros (Dicerorhinus sumatrensis) were found during the Holocene (ca. 10,000 BCE - present). The genus Rhinoceros has never been found north of the Yellow River.

Remains of both Sumatran and Javan rhinoceros have been found at the Neolithic site of Hemudu in Zhejiang Province. Fossils of Sumatran rhinoceros in China are more common than of Javan rhinoceros, being also found in Neolithic sites of Xiawanggang, Hunan Province; Dongshan County, Fujian Province; and the northeastern Tibetan Plateau.

Northern China was also home to the gigantic one-horned near-rhino Elasmotherium, which persisted in the Western Siberian Plain until about 36,000–35,000 years ago. It has been speculated that the Chinese "unicorn", known as the qilin or zhi is a folk memory of the Elasmotherium. A wooden sculpture of a charging bull-like creature with a huge single horn, similar to reconstructions of the Elasmotherium, was discovered in a late Western Han (206 BC – AD 9) tomb at Wuwei, Gansu in 1959. However, no keratinous horn of Elasmotherium has ever been found, only the dome base in the skull, made of bone. In 2021, a study examined the skull dome and neck musculature of Elasmotherium and challenged traditional portrayals with a long horn. Instead, it was theorized that the actual horn was short, and the large dome functioned as a resonating chamber of some sort.

=== History ===
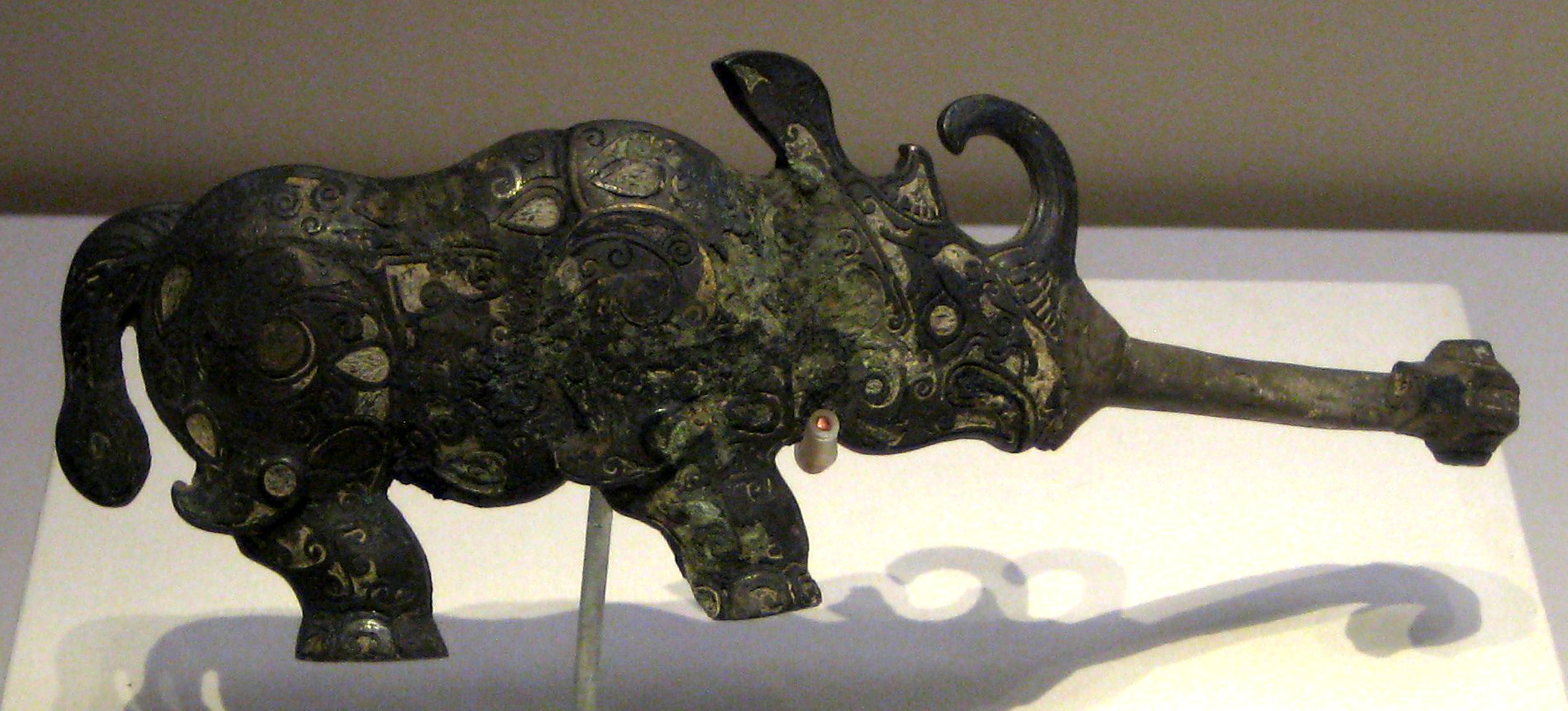
Warring States period bronze belt hook in the form of a two-horned rhinoceros, from the State of Ba (modern Sichuan).

Most depictions of rhinoceroses in Shang, Zhou and Han art show two distinct horns, and in some cases wrinkles around the eyes are also evident, which are features only found in the Sumatran Rhinoceros. However, a few examples of sculptures showing one-horned rhinoceroses are also known, for example on a bronze cylinder supported by three rhinoceroses from the tomb of King Cuo of Zhongshan (late 4th century BC). Some historians have taken this as evidence that, in addition to the Sumatran rhinoceros which were more widely distributed within China, the one-horned Javan rhinoceros was also present in ancient China. On the other hand, the posterior horn of the Sumatran rhinoceros is often undeveloped and inconspicuous, so it is still possible that such examples of one-horned rhinoceroses may in fact also represent the Sumatran rhinoceros.

During the Shang dynasty the range of the rhinoceros may have reached as far north in Inner Mongolia as the territory of the Shang kings, in the Yellow River valley, but over time its range was reduced, and by the Han dynasty it was no longer present in northern China, north of the Yangtze River and in Zhongyuan. The Classic of Mountains and Seas, completed during the Han dynasty, mentions several regions inhabited by wild rhinoceroses, distinguishing two types, one of which has a single horn. This presumed reference to the Javan rhinoceros is placed in the Yangtze River basin. By the Tang dynasty (618–907) rhinoceroses were only found south of the Yangtze, in the provinces of Guangdong, Guangxi and Yunnan.

One of the last strongholds of native rhinoceroses in China was Sichuan, where they were reported to be living up to the late 17th century. The last native population of rhinoceros only became extinct in Yunnan province in the 20th century. A small population of southern white rhinoceros (native to South Africa) was introduced in 2013.

== Rhinoceros hunting ==
Several Shang dynasty oracle bone inscriptions record the hunting of the sì, including one famous inscription that tells how an accident befell King Wu Ding's hunting party whilst in pursuit of a sì:

On the day Jiawu the king went to hunt a rhinoceros. The carriage of courtier Chu broke its axis. A gelding tripped over stones and bolted away from the king's carriage. Prince Yang also fell down.

The Book of Songs, dating to the Western Zhou (c. 1046–771 BC), also describes the hunting of the sì:

We have bent our bows;
We have our arrows on the string.
Here is a small boar transifixed;
There is a large rhinoceros killed.
The spoil will be presented to the visitors and guests,
Along with the cup of sweet wine. — Book of Songs no.180, trans. James Legge (1814–1897)

However, as discussed above, some scholars now believe that the sì was a wild buffalo rather than a rhinoceros. The character for the xī, which is universally agreed to refer to the rhinoceros, does not occur in oracle bone inscriptions, so there is no certain literary evidence that rhinoceroses were hunted during the Shang dynasty. Nevertheless, there is some archaeological evidence, in the form of a tarsal bone and a carpal bone from a rhinoceros, that rhinoceroses were present in the region of the Shang capital Yin, and most historians accept that rhinoceroses probably were hunted during the Shang dynasty.

The earliest literary mention of hunting the xī rhinoceros occurs in the "Great Capture" chapter of the Lost Book of Zhou (Yizhoushu 逸周書), where the results of a hunting trip on an enormous scale by the first king of the Zhou dynasty, King Wu, are recounted:

King Wu hunted and netted 22 tigers, 2 panthers, 5,235 stags, 12 rhinoceri, 721 yaks, 151 bears, 118 yellow-bears, 353 boars, 18 badgers, 16 king-stags, 50 musk-deer, 30 tailed-deer, and 3,508 deer.

In the Manshu (Tang dynasty) it states that rhinoceroses were hunted by the Nanzhao (in modern Yunnan) using pit traps, and that it was believed that killing one would always bring a thunderstorm.

== Rhinoceroses in captivity ==
One of the earliest pieces of evidence for a captive rhinoceros in China comes from the tomb of Empress Dowager Bo (died 155 BC), a concubine of the first emperor of the Han dynasty, where a complete rhinoceros's skeleton was unearthed. It is thought that this was a specimen from the royal zoo. The Analects has this interesting saying which indicates rhinos were held captive even during the period of Confucius (500 B.C.E): "And further, you speak wrongly. When a tiger or rhinoceros escapes from his cage; when a tortoise or piece of jade is injured in its repository:-whose is the fault?" ("Analects 16:7).

During the Tang dynasty a number of rhinoceroses were presented to the imperial court from south-east Asian countries, including Champa, Chinrap, and Kalinga, as well as Tibet and a country named as Persia. At least some of these were specimens of Indian rhinoceros. Performing elephants and rhinoceroses took part in the entertainments for Emperor Xuanzong of Tang (reigned 712–756).

== Rhinoceroses in early Chinese art ==
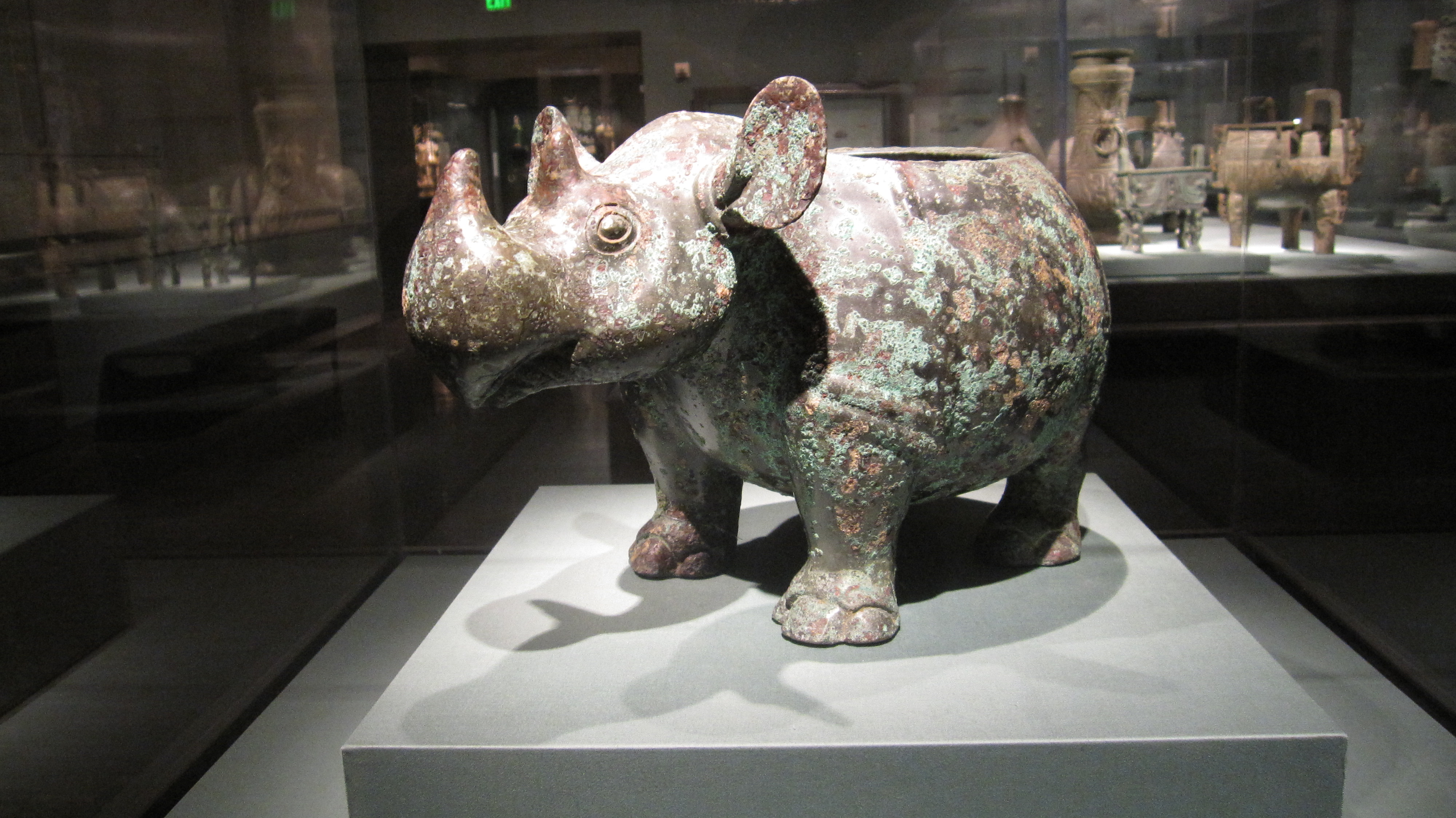
Rhinoceros-shaped wine vessel dating to the late Shang dynasty.

The earliest, and one of the most impressive, examples of a rhinoceros in Chinese art is a bronze zun wine vessel unearthed in Shandong in 1843, and formerly in the collection of Avery Brundage, which is thought to date to the reign of the last king of Shang, during the first half of the 11th century BC. The vessel is in the form of a two-horned rhinoceros with a rotund body and splayed legs, possibly a Sumatran rhino.

Another bronze rhinoceros wine vessel, dating to the Western Han dynasty (206 BC – AD 9), was discovered in Shaanxi in 1963 (shown at the top of this page). This one is even more lifelike and realistic than the Shang dynasty example, and must have been modelled on an actual rhinoceros. It is also a more highly decorated piece of art, with complex cloud patterns inlaid into its skin with gold and silver wire. Laurence Sickman has noted that "[i]n its bony head, powerful shoulders, ponderous hindquarters, thick folds of skin, firmly planted hoofs, and stance with head lifted on the alert, the essential reality of a rhinoceros is present in a bronze of superlative quality". This rhinoceros has two horns and shows distinctive wrinkles around the eyes which are characteristic features of the Sumatran rhinoceros. The lid of the vessel is in the form of a saddle, and straps attaching the saddle to the rhinoceros go around the belly of the animal, suggesting that the model for this vessel must have been a tame rhinoceros.

== Rhinoceros hide armour ==
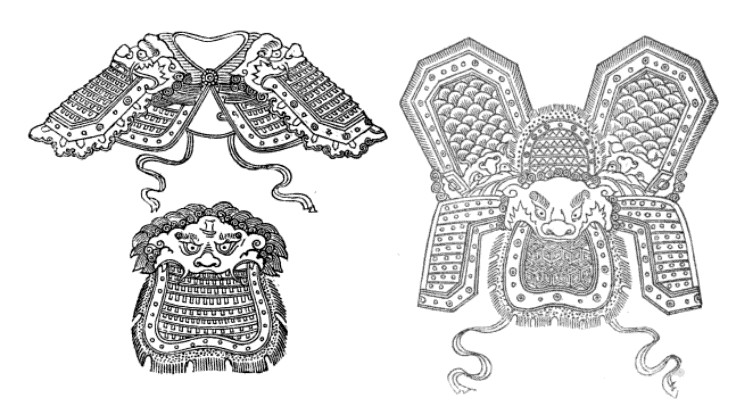
Drawing of rhinoceros hide and buffalo hide armour.

During the Zhou dynasty (1045–256 BC) rhinoceros hide was used for armour. The Rites of Zhou specifies:

The rhinoceros-hide armour was of seven folds or links, one over another; the wild-buffalo's-hide armour was of six folds or links; and the armour, made of two hides together was of five folds or links. The rhinoceros-hide armour would endure 100 years; the wild-buffalo-hide armour 200 years; and the armour of double hide 300 years.

During the Warring States period, the southern State of Chu was renowned for its rhinoceros hide armour, and the philosopher Xun Zi from the northern State of Qi, who was an official in Chu for a short time, notes that "[t]he soldiers of Chu were equipped with armour made of sharkskin and rhinoceros hide as hard as metal or stone, and with pikes of Nanyang steel that could sting a man like a wasp or a scorpion".

Rhinoceros and buffalo hide was also recorded to have been used for the inner coffin of the emperor, as it was supposed to preserve the body, similar in function to Han dynasty jade burial suits.

In the Manshu (Tang dynasty) it states that rhino and buffalo hide was used for saddles, armor and weapons of Nanzhao troops in Yunnan.

== Rhinoceros horn ==
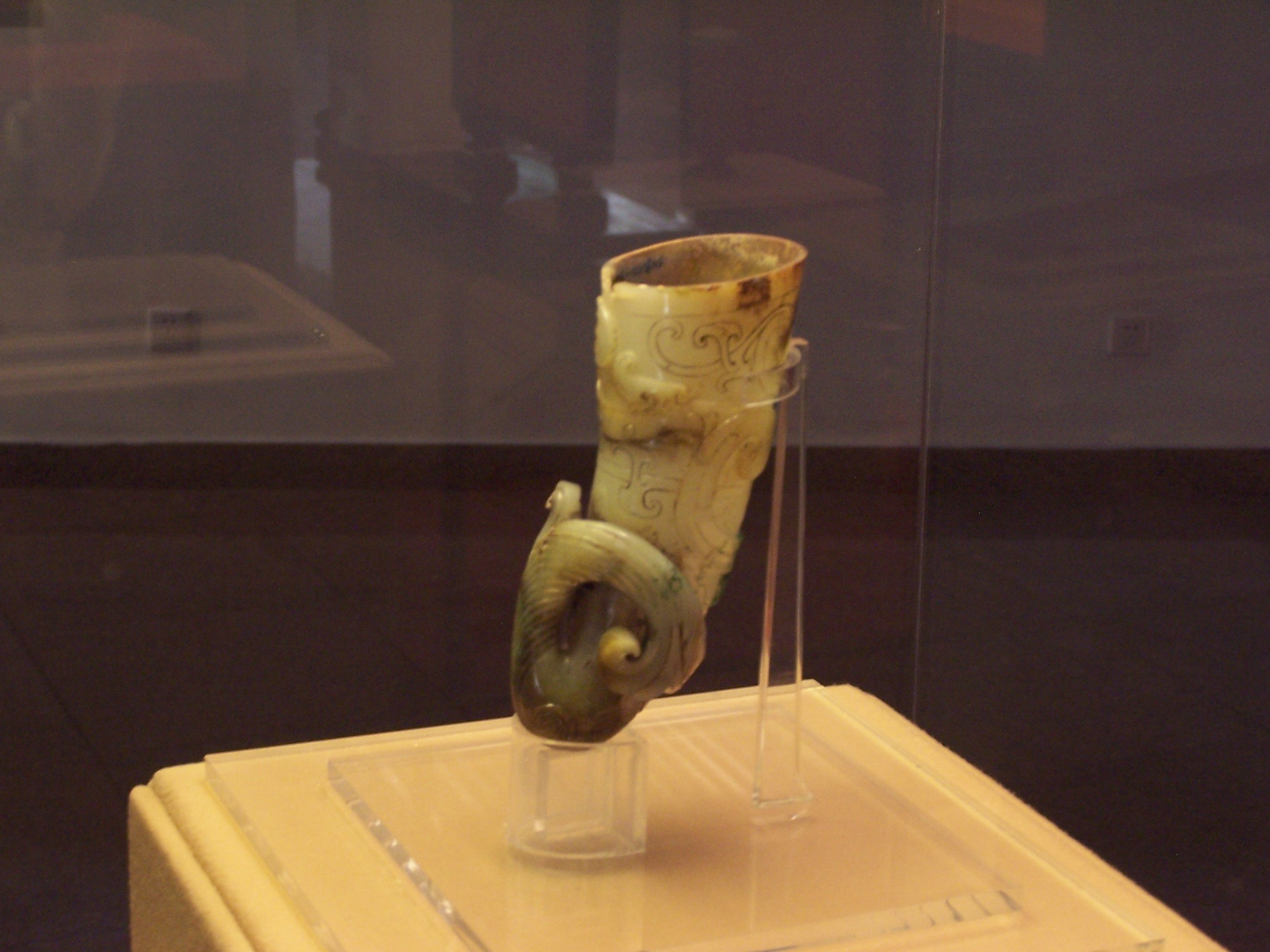
Jade imitation of a rhinoceros horn cup from the Mausoleum of the King of Nanyue.

From an early date, rhinoceros horn was believed to have special properties, in particular that it would react by fizzing if it came into contact with poison, and so cups made out of rhinoceros horn were valued as a protection against poisoning. It is thought that rhinoceros horn cups developed during the Warring States Period or earlier, and rhinoceros cups (Chinese sìgōng 兕觥) feature prominently in pre-Han literature; they are, for example, mentioned in four of the 300 odes of the Book of Songs (nos. 3, 154, 215 and 292). Although there are no surviving examples of rhinoceros horn cups from this period, imitation rhinoceros horn cups are known, such as a version made of jade from the tomb of King Zhao Mo of Nanyue (reigned 137–122 BC).

The earliest surviving examples of rhinoceros cups are examples held at the Shōsōin treasure house in Nara, Japan, that date to the Tang dynasty. During the Tang dynasty cups like these were used as presents for successful candidates in the imperial examinations.

Cups made out of rhinoceros horn were very popular during the Ming (1368–1644) and Qing (1644–1912) dynasties, when they were used as libation cups for ritual purposes. Many examples of Ming and Qing rhinoceros horn cups are held in museums and private collections, and in recent years a number of rhinoceros horn cups have sold for large sums of money:

- a 17th-century cup sold for £80,000 in 2010
- a 17th-century cup sold for £300,000 in 2011
- 5 cups were valued at $1m to $1.5m in 2011

In addition to cups, rhinoceros horn was also sometimes used to make other objects, such as medicine / snuff bottles, hair pins, belt hooks, and dress toggles. Due to high demand for rhinoceros horn medicine, rhinoceros horn carvings were ground down for medicine. Whilst the popularity of libation cups has aided their survival, it appears far fewer of these other examples have survived.

== See also ==
- Dogs in ancient China
- Elephants in ancient China
- Hymn to the Fallen (Jiu Ge)
- Wildlife of China
