= Old Eyes, New Heart =

Studio album by Madder Mortem
- Released: January 26, 2024
- Recorded: 2021–2023
- Genre: Post-metal, progressive metal, gothic metal, alternative metal
- Length: 48:14
- Label: Dark Essence Records
- Producer: BP M. Kirkevaag

Madder Mortem chronology
Marrow (2018)	Old Eyes, New Heart (2024)

Old Eyes, New Heart is the eighth studio album by Norwegian metal band Madder Mortem, released on 26 January 2024 on Dark Essence Records. The album artwork is a painting by the Kirkevaag siblings' father Jakob who died the previous year.

== Track listing ==
No.	Title	Length
1.	"Coming from the Dark"	4:53
2.	"On Guard"	3:42
3.	"Master Tongue"	4:43
4.	"The Head That Wears the Crown"	4:25
5.	"Cold Hard Rain"	7:00
6.	"Unity"	3:52
7.	"Towers"	4:43
8.	"Here and Now"	4:29
9.	"Things I'll Never Do"	6:34
10.	"Long Road"	3:53

== Personnel ==
Madder Mortem

- Agnete M. Kirkevaag – vocals
- BP M. Kirkevaag – guitars, percussion and vocals
- Anders Langberg – guitars
- Tormod L. Moseng – bass
- Mads Solås – drums, percussion, backing vocals

"On Guard" was composed and recorded with Richard Wikstrand on guitars.

Production

- Produced by BP M. Kirkevaag
- Engineered by BP M. Kirkevaag
- Mixed by BP M. Kirkevaag
- Mastering – Peter in de Betou at Tailor Maid
- Recorded at Skytterhuset and Studio Omnivore
