= Deadlands (album) =

Studio album by Madder Mortem
- Released: 21 October 2002
- Recorded: 2002
- Genre: Progressive metal, gothic metal, doom metal
- Length: 57:09
- Label: Century Media Europe
- Producer: Madder Mortem and Pelle Saether

Madder Mortem chronology
All Flesh is Grass (2001)	Deadlands (2002)	Desiderata (2006)

Professional ratings
Review scores
Source	Rating
AllMusic	4.5/5 stars
Chronicles of Chaos	9/10 stars
Sputnikmusic	4.5/5

Deadlands is the third studio album by Norwegian metal band Madder Mortem, released on Century Media Europe on 21 October 2002. Released in the US on The End Records, 11 February 2003. It was the final CD to be released by them on Century Media Records. The band have since signed to Peaceville records.

== Track listing ==
No.	Title	Length
1.	"Enter"	1:07
2.	"Necropol Lit"	4:04
3.	"Omnivore"	4:44
4.	"Rust Cleansing"	7:20
5.	"Faceless"	5:41
6.	"Distance Will Save Us"	5:06
7.	"Silverspine"	8:12
8.	"Jigsaw (The Pattern and the Puzzle)"	4:53
9.	"Deadlands"	6:05
10.	"Resonatine"	9:57

The album was re-released in the UK on Peaceville Records, November 2009, with two bonus tracks:

1. "The Exile" – 5:34
2. "Deadlands Revisited" – 5:48

== Personnel ==
Madder Mortem

- Agnete M. Kirkevaag – lead vocals
- BP M. Kirkevaag – guitars, percussion, backing vocals
- Eirik Ulvo Langnes – guitars
- Paul Mozart Bjorke – bass, percussion, backing vocals
- Mads Solås – drums, percussion

Production

- Produced by Madder Mortem and Pelle Saether
- Engineered by Pelle Saether, Lars Lindén and Madder Mortem
- Mixed by Pelle Saether
- Mastering by Ulf Horbelt at DMS, Marl, Germany

Bonus track production

- Recorded at Loppa & Huseby
- Ingvild "Sareeta" Kaare – violin, strings
- Produced, engineered, mixed by BP M. Kirkevaag
- Mastering by Peter In de Betou at Tailor Maid
