= Desiderata (Madder Mortem album) =

Studio album by Madder Mortem
- Released: 27 March 2006
- Genres: Progressive metal, avant-garde metal, gothic metal, symphonic metal
- Length: 54:43
- Label: Peaceville

Madder Mortem chronology
| Deadlands (2002) | Desiderata (2006) | Eight Ways (2009) |

Singles from Desiderata
- 1. "My Name Is Silence"

Professional ratings
Review scores
| Source | Rating |
|---|---|
| Chronicles of Chaos | 9/10 stars |
| Sputnikmusic | 4/5 stars |

Desiderata is the fourth studio album by Norwegian metal band Madder Mortem, released on 24 April 2006 (in Norway on 27 March 2006). It was their first CD release on Peaceville Records. The album spawned a digital single, "My Name Is Silence". A video was also shot for the single.

Desiderata is the Latin word for "things worthy of desire".

== Track listing ==
| No. | Title | Length |
|---|---|---|
| 1. | "My Name Is Silence" | 3:07 |
| 2. | "Evasions" | 5:14 |
| 3. | "Plague on This Land" | 4:39 |
| 4. | "Dystopia" | 1:16 |
| 5. | "M for Malice" | 4:16 |
| 6. | "The Flood to Come" | 4:55 |
| 7. | "Changeling" | 4:25 |
| 8. | "Cold Stone" | 6:01 |
| 9. | "Hypnos" | 4:38 |
| 10. | "Sedition" | 4:05 |
| 11. | "Desiderata" | 6:07 |
| 12. | "Hangman" | 6:02 |

== Personnel ==
Madder Mortem

- Agnete M. Kirkevaag – lead vocals
- BP M. Kirkevaag – guitars, backing vocals, percussion
- Odd E. Ebbesen – guitars
- Tormod L. Moseng – bass guitar, double bass, backing vocals
- Mads Solås – drums, percussion, backing vocals

Production

- Produced by Madder Mortem
- Engineered by Henning Ramseth and Madder Mortem
- Mixed by Fredrik Nordström and Patrick Sten at Studio Fredman, except "Dystopia" and "Cold Stone" (mixed by Henning Ramseth at Space Valley studio)
- Mastering by Peter In de Betou at Tailor Maid
