= Madder Mortem =

Norwegian progressive metal band

- Also known as: Mystery Tribe (1993–1997)
- Origin: Nord-Odal, Hedmark, Norway
- Genres: Progressive metal; avant-garde metal; alternative metal; doom metal; gothic metal
- Years active: 1993–present
- Labels: Misanthropy; Century Media; The End; Peaceville; Dark Essence Records
- Members: Agnete M. Kirkevaag; BP M. Kirkevaag; Tormod Langøien Moseng; Mads Solås; Anders Langberg
- Past members: Odd Eivind Ebbesen; Boye Nyberg; Sigurd Nilsen; Eirik Ulvo Langnes; Patrick Scantlebury; Richard Wikstrand; Paul Mozart Bjørke; Christian Ruud
- Website: maddermortem.com

Madder Mortem is a Norwegian progressive metal band. They were originally formed by siblings Agnete and BP M. Kirkevaag in 1993 as a doom metal/gothic metal band as Mystery Tribe, but changed the name to Madder Mortem in 1997.

The group released their first full-length album, Mercury, in 1999, but the band's label folded soon after its release, and all members except the Kirkevaags left. A new lineup recorded the All Flesh Is Grass album for a new label, Century Media, in 2001, and Deadlands followed on The End Records in 2002, after which further lineup changes ensued. On 21 July 2014 the band announced the addition of a new guitar player, Richard Wikstrand, formerly of Chrome Division.

Red In Tooth And Claw, their sixth full-length album, was released on 28 October 2016 via Dark Essence Records. The band followed with the worldwide release of Marrow on 21 September 2018. The release of Marrow also coincided with another lineup change, with guitarist Richard Wikstrand being replaced by Anders Langberg, known from Souls Of Tide. The band's next album, Old Eyes, New Heart, was released on Dark Essence Records 26 January 2024.

== Live performances ==
Madder Mortem has an extensive history of live performances across Europe and beyond. In September/October 2001, they supported Tristania, Rotting Christ, and Vintersorg on a 23-date European tour. In early 2003 they joined Opeth on the European leg of their "Deliverance" tour, which included their first shows in the UK, totalling 33 gigs.

They have played festivals including Brutal Assault in the Czech Republic, Popkomm in Germany, Yuletide Metal Meeting in Northern Ireland, and Conmusic in Mexico; as well as the Norwegian festivals Transistorfestivalen, Southern Discomfort, Inferno Metal Festival, and Quart Festival.

Madder Mortem performed at the festival Livestock at Alvdal in rural Norway on 11 July 2014. In 2017, the band supported the Soen European Lykaia tour, showcasing their presence in the progressive metal circuit. Among the highlights of their recent live history is their performance at ProgPower Europe 2024 in Baarlo, Netherlands, where they played a prime evening slot. The festival is well regarded in the progressive metal community, and Madder Mortem's appearance underlined their stature as a significant live act within this scene.

== Members ==
=== Current lineup ===
- Agnete M. Kirkevaag − lead vocals (1993–present)
- BP M. Kirkevaag − guitar, percussion, backing vocals (1993–present)
- Mads Solås − drums, percussion, backing vocals (1999–present)
- Tormod Langøien Moseng − bass guitar, double bass, backing vocals (2003–present)
- Anders Langberg − guitar (2018–present)

=== Former members ===
- Christian Ruud − guitar, backing vocals (1993–1999)
- Boye Nyberg − bass guitar (1993–1999)
- Sigurd Nilsen − drums, percussion (1996–1999)
- Eirik Ulvo Langnes − guitar (2000–2003)
- Pål Mozart Bjørke − bass guitar, percussion, keyboards, backing vocals (2000–2003, died 2025)
- Odd Eivind Ebbesen − guitar (2003–2010)
- Patrick Scantlebury − guitar (2010–2014)
- Richard Wikstrand − guitar (2014–2018)

== Discography ==
=== Full-Lengths ===
- Mercury (1999)
- All Flesh Is Grass (2001)
- Deadlands (2002)
- Desiderata (2006)
- Eight Ways (2009)
- Red in Tooth and Claw (2016)
- Marrow (2018)
- Old Eyes, New Heart (2024)

=== Demos ===
- Misty Sleep (1997)
- Demo 98 (1998)
- Demo 2000 (2000)

=== Singles and EPs ===
- "My Name is Silence" (single, 2007)
- Where Dream and Day Collide (EP, 2010) GRC #32
