= Public holidays in China =

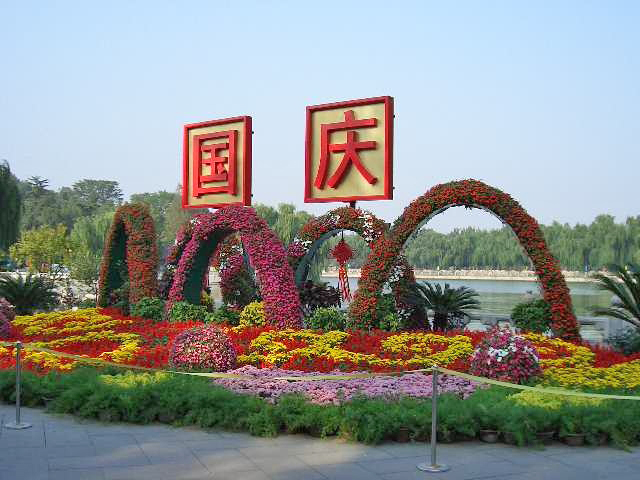
Chinese National Day in 2004 at Beihai Park, Beijing

There are currently seven official public holidays in the People's Republic of China. Each year's holidays are announced about one month before the start of the year by the General Office of the State Council. A notable feature of such holidays is that weekends are usually swapped with the weekdays next to the actual holiday to create a longer holiday period. Generally, by adjusting the adjacent weekends, a "golden week" or a three to five-day "short holiday" is formed.

Festivals in mainland China have been around since the Qin dynasty around 221–206 BC. During the more prosperous Tang dynasty from AD 618–907, festivals involved less sacrifice and mystery to more entertainment. Culminating to the modern era Between the 1920s until around the 1970s, the Chinese began observing two sets of holidays, which were the traditional and what became "official", celebrating the accomplishments of the communist regime. There was then a major reform in 2008, abolishing the Labour Day Golden Week and adding three traditional Chinese holidays (Qingming Festival, Duanwu Festival, and Mid-Autumn Festival). From at least 2000 until this reform, the Spring Festival public holiday began on New Year's Day itself. From 2008 to 2013 it was shifted back by one day to begin on Chinese New Year's Eve. In 2014, New Year's Eve became a working day again, which provoked hostile discussion by netizens and academics. However, since 2015, Chinese New Year's Eve is usually swapped with nearby weekends so that people need not work on Chinese New Year's Eve.

== Overview ==
Holidays in China are complicated and are one of the least predictable among developing nations. In all these holidays, if the holiday lands on a weekend, the days will be reimbursed after the weekend. The National Holidays and Anniversary Holidays Measures issued by the State Council is the highest administrative regulation for regulating national holidays. The establishment of theme holidays and industry-specific holidays is stipulated by law or approved by the State Council. At present, China's current statutory annual holiday standard is 13 days.

The Chinese New Year and National Day holidays are three days long. The week-long holidays on May (Labor) Day and National Day began in 2000, as a measure to increase and encourage holiday spending. The resulting seven-day or eight-day (if Mid-Autumn Festival is near National Day) holidays are called "Golden Weeks" (黄金周), and have become peak seasons for travel and tourism. In 2008, the Labor Day holiday was shortened to three days to reduce travel rushes to just twice a year, and instead, three traditional Chinese holidays were added.

Generally, if there is a three-day or four-day (if Mid-Autumn Festival is near National Day) holiday, the government will declare it to be a seven-day or eight-day holiday. However, citizens are required to work during a nearby weekend. Businesses and schools would then treat the affected Saturdays and Sundays as the weekdays that the weekend has been swapped with. Schedules are released late in the year prior and might change during the year.

The following is a graphical schematic of how the weekend shifting works.

Example

New Year's Day Holiday, 2010
Dec				Jan
28	29	30	31	1	2	3	4	5	6	7
M	T	W	T	F	S	S	M	T	W	T
Weekdays					Weekend		Weekdays
becomes
Weekdays				Holiday	Weekend		Weekdays

Chinese New Year Holiday, 2010
Feb
12	13	14	15	16	17	18	19	20	21	22
F	S	S	M	T	W	T	F	S	S	M
Weekdays	Weekend		Weekdays					Weekend		Weekdays
becomes
Weekdays	Holiday			Moved Weekend		Moved Weekend		Moved Weekdays		Weekdays

Qingming Holiday, 2010
Mar		Apr
30	31	1	2	3	4	5	6	7	8	9
T	W	T	F	S	S	M	T	W	T	F
Weekdays				Weekend		Weekdays
becomes
Weekdays				Weekend		Holiday	Weekdays

Labor Day Holiday, 2010
Apr				May
27	28	29	30	1	2	3	4	5	6	7
T	W	T	F	S	S	M	T	W	T	F
Weekdays				Weekend		Weekdays
becomes
Weekdays				Holiday	Long Weekend		Weekdays

Dragon Boat Festival Holiday, 2010
Jun
10	11	12	13	14	15	16	17	18	19	20
T	F	S	S	M	T	W	T	F	S	S
Weekdays		Weekend		Weekdays					Weekend
becomes
Weekdays		Moved Weekdays		Moved Weekend		Holiday	Weekdays		Weekend

Mid-Autumn Festival Holiday and National Day Holiday, 2010
Sept														Oct
17	18	19	20	21	22	23	24	25	26	27	28	29	30	1	2	3	4	5	6	7	8	9	10	11
F	S	S	M	T	W	T	F	S	S	M	T	W	T	F	S	S	M	T	W	T	F	S	S	M
Weekday	Weekend		Weekdays					Weekend		Weekdays					Weekend		Weekdays					Weekend		Weekday
becomes
Weekday	Weekend	Moved Weekday	Weekdays		Holiday	Moved Weekend		Moved Weekdays		Weekdays				Holiday			Moved Weekend		Moved Weekend		Weekday	Moved Weekday	Weekend	Weekday

=== Weekend shifting scheme (since 2014) ===
==== Spring Festival ====
Shift the Saturdays and Sundays nearby to make a 7-day holiday. People may need to work for 6 or 7 continuous days before or after the holiday.

==== National Day (not near Mid-Autumn Festival) ====
Shift the Saturdays and Sundays nearby to make a 7-day holiday. The holiday is from 1 to 7 October. People may need to work for 6 or 7 continuous days before or after the holiday.

==== New Year, Tomb-Sweeping Day, Labor Day (before 2020), Dragon Boat Festival and Mid-Autumn Festival (not near National Day) ====
- Wednesday: No weekend shifting. The holiday is only 1 day long. This is to prevent people from working for 7 continuous days since 2014. Sometimes shift the Sundays nearby to make a 4-day holiday. People may need to work for 6 continuous days after the holiday.
- Tuesday or Thursday: Shift the Saturdays and Sundays nearby to make a 3-day holiday. People may need to work for 6 continuous days before or after the holiday.
- Saturday or Sunday: The public holiday is transferred to Monday.

==== Labor Day (since 2020) ====
Shift the Saturdays or Sundays nearby to make a 5-day holiday. People may need to work for 6 consecutive days before or after the holiday.

== List of holidays ==
=== Statutory holidays ===
Name	Date	Length (without weekends)	Remarks	Ref.
New Year's Day (元旦; Yuándàn)	1 January	1 day		
Spring Festival (Note: The authorities always refer to "Chinese New Year" as 'Spring Festival' since they recognize the Gregorian calendar.) (春节; Chūnjié)	1st day of 1st Lunisolar month	4 days (Chinese New Year's Eve, 1st, 2nd and 3rd days of 1st Lunisolar month)	Usually occurs in late January or early February. The most important holiday, celebrating the start of a new year	
Tomb-Sweeping Day (清明节; Qīngmíngjié)	5 April (4 or 6 April in some years)	1 day	Occurs about 15 days after the March Equinox; day for paying respect to one's ancestors	
Labour Day (劳动节; Láodòngjié)	1 May	2 days	International Workers' Day	
Dragon Boat Festival (端午节; Duānwǔjié)	5th day of 5th Lunisolar month	1 day	Usually occurs in June; commemoration of the ancient poet Qu Yuan	
Mid-Autumn Festival (中秋节; Zhōngqiūjié)	15th day of 8th Lunisolar month	1 day	Usually occurs in September; important autumn celebration of harvest and togetherness	
National Day (国庆节; Guóqìngjié)	1 October	3 days	Commemorating the formal Proclamation of the People's Republic of China on 1 October 1949	

=== Additional holidays for specific social groups ===
In addition to these holidays, applicable to the whole population, there are four official public holidays applicable to specific sections of the population:

Name	Date	Applicable to	Ref.
International Women's Day (国际妇女节; Guójì Fùnǚ Jié)	8 March	Women (half-day)	
Youth Day (青年节; Qīngniánjié)	4 May	Youth from the age of 14 to 28 (half-day)	
Children's Day (六一儿童节; Liùyī értóng jié)	1 June	Children below the age of 14 (half-day)	
Army Day (建军节; Jiàn jūn jié)	1 August	Military personnel in active service (half-day)	

The closeness of Labor Day and Youth Day resulted in an unexpectedly long break for schools in 2008 - the Youth Day half-holiday entitlement had been largely forgotten because it has been subsumed into the Golden Week.

=== National holidays and memorial days ===
Article 5 of the Regulations on National Holidays and Anniversary Days stipulates that "No holidays will be given for February 7th Anniversary, May 30th Anniversary, July 7th Anniversary of the War of Resistance Against Japanese Aggression, September 3rd Anniversary of the Victory of the War of Resistance Against Japanese Aggression, September 18th Anniversary, Teachers' Day, Nurses' Day, Journalists' Day, Arbor Day, and other holidays and anniversaries."

Date	English name	Chinese name	Remarks	Ref.
7 February	February 7th Anniversary	二七纪念日	Commemorating the Great Strike of February 7	
12 March	Arbor Day	植树节	Also known as National Tree Planting Day (全民义务植树日; Quánmín yìwù zhíshù rì)	
12 May	Nurses Day	护士节	International Nurses Day	
30 May	May 30th Anniversary	五卅纪念日	Commemorating the May Thirtieth Movement of 1925	
7 July	July 7th Anti-Japanese War Memorial Day	七七抗战纪念日	Commemorating the Marco Polo Bridge incident of 1937	
3 September	Victory Day of the Chinese People's War of Resistance Against Japanese Aggression	中国人民抗日战争胜利纪念日	Honoring the Allied victory over Japan and the end of the Second World War in the Pacific (new holiday established 2014)	
10 September	Teachers' Day	教师节		
18 September	September 18th Anti-Japanese War Memorial Day	九一八抗战纪念日	Commemorating the Mukden incident of 1931	
8 November	Journalists' Day	记者节	Journalists' Day is celebrated on November 8, the day when the China Youth Journalists Association (the predecessor of the All-China Journalists Association) was founded in Shanghai in 1937.	

=== Other national themed festivals and anniversaries ===
Date	English name	Chinese name	Establishment	Remarks	Ref.
10 January	Chinese People's Police Day	中国人民警察节	2021	110 Police Hotline	
3 March	National Ear Care Day	全国爱耳日	2000	Double ear shape "33"	
Last Monday of March	National Safety Education Day for Primary and Secondary School Students	全国中小学生安全教育日	1996		
15 April	National Security Education Day	全民国家安全教育日	2016	Day to enhance the national security awareness	
24 April	China Space Day	中国航天日	2016	The date China's first artificial earth satellite Dong Fang Hong 1 was successfully launched	
18 May	China Tourism Day	中国旅游日	2011	The opening day of Xu Xiake's Travels	
3rd Sunday of May	National Disability Day	全国助残日	1991		
30 May	National Science and Technology Workers' Day	全国科技工作者日	2017		
6 June	National Eye Care Day	全国爱眼日	1996		
2nd Saturday of June	China's Cultural Heritage Day	文化和自然遗产日	2006		
3rd day of the National Energy Conservation Publicity Week	National Low Carbon Day	全国低碳日	2013		
25 June	National Land Day	全国土地日	1991	The date the Land Administration Law of the People's Republic of China was promulgated	
11 July	China National Maritime Day	中国航海日	2005	The anniversary of Zheng He's first voyage	
8 August	National Fitness Day	全民健身日	2009	The opening day of the 2008 Summer Olympics	
15 August	National Ecology Day	全国生态日	2023		
19 August	Chinese Doctors' Day	中国医师节	2018		
Autumnal equinox day	Chinese Farmers' Harvest Festival	中国农民丰收节	2018		
3rd Saturday of September	National Defense Education Day	全民国防教育日	2001		
29 September	National Love Teeth Day	全国爱牙日	1989		
29 September	Civic Morality Promotion Day	公民道德宣传日	2003	The date the Implementation Outline of Citizen Morality Construction was promulgated	
30 September	Martyrs' Day	烈士纪念日	2014	Honors all the fallen of the country right before National Day, new holiday established in 2014	
25 October	Commemoration Day of Taiwan's Restoration	台湾光复纪念日	2025	Commemorates the retrocession of and the end of the Japanese colonial rule in Taiwan	
9th day of the 9th lunar month	Senior Citizens' Day	老年节	2013	Double Ninth Festival	
9 November	National Fire Protection Day	全国消防日	1992	Fire alarm number "119"	
2 December	National Traffic Safety Day	全国交通安全日	2012	Traffic accident alarm number "122"	
4 December	National Law Publicity Day	全国法制宣传日	2001	The date the Constitution of China was promulgated. Also the National Constitution Day	
13 December	National Memorial Day for the Victims of the Nanjing Massacre	南京大屠杀死难者国家公祭日	2014	Commemorates the victims of the Nanjing Massacre	

=== Other holidays ===
Date	English name	Local name	Pinyin	Remarks
2nd day of 2nd Lunisolar month	Zhonghe Festival (Dragon Raising its Head)	中和节	Zhōng hé jié	Based on Chinese calendar
1 July	Anniversary of the Chinese Communist Party	建党节	Jiàndǎng jié	Formation of 1st National Congress in July 1921
7th day of 7th Lunisolar month	Qixi Festival	七夕	Qīxī	The Chinese Valentine's Day, based on Chinese calendar
15th day of 7th Lunisolar month	Spirit Festival (Ghost Festival)	中元节	Zhōng yuán jié	Based on Chinese calendar
10 October	Wuchang Uprising	武昌起义	Wǔchāng Qǐyì	Commemoration of the anti-monarch uprising against the Qing which began the Xinhai Revolution
9th day of 9th Lunisolar month	Chongyang Festival	重阳节	Chóngyáng jié	Based on Chinese calendar.

== Ethnic minorities' holidays ==
There are public holidays celebrated by certain ethnic minorities in certain regions, which are decided by local governments. The following are holidays at the provincial level.

Date	English name	Local name	Chinese name	Pinyin	Ethnic groups	Remarks
1st day of Tibetan year	Losar	ལོ་གསར	洛萨/藏历新年	Luò sà / zànglì xīnnián	Tibetan	7 days in Tibet
30.6 of Tibetan calendar	Sho Dun	༄༅། ཞོ་སྟོན།	雪顿节	Xuě dùn jié	Tibetan	1 day in Tibet
1.9 of Islamic calendar	Eid al-Fitr		开斋节/肉孜节	Kāizhāi jié / ròu zī jié	Hui, Uyghur and other Muslims	3 days in Ningxia; 1 day in Xinjiang
10.12 of Islamic calendar	Eid al-Adha		古尔邦节	Gǔ'ěrbāng jié	Hui, Uyghur and other Muslims	2 days in Ningxia; 3 days in Xinjiang
3.3 of Lunisolar calendar	Sam Nyied Sam	Sam Nyied Sam	三月三	Sān Yuè Sān	Zhuang	3 days in Guangxi

The following are traditional holidays at the prefectural level, and there are more at lower-level divisions, i.e. county-level.

Date	Celebrating location	English name	Chinese name	Pinyin	Ethnic groups	Remarks
6th day of the 6th Lunisolar month	Qiannan and Qianxinan	Liuyueliu	六月六	Liù Yuè Liù	Bouyei	1 day in Qiannan and Qianxinan
8th day of the 8th Lunisolar month	Qiannan and Qianxinan	Bayueba	八月八	Bā Yuè Bā	Miao	1 day in Qiannan and Qianxinan
10th day of the 9th Lunisolar month	Dehong		阿露窝罗节	Ā Lù Wō Luó jié	Achang	2 days in Dehong
1st day of Tibetan year	Dêqên, Garzê, Gannan and Ngawa	Losar	藏历新年	Luò sà / zànglì xīnnián	Tibetan	3 days in Dêqên, Garzê, Gannan and Ngawa
24th day of the 6th Lunisolar month	Honghe		矻扎扎节	Kū Zhā Zhā jié	Hani	2 days in Honghe
24th day of the 6th Lunisolar month	Chuxiong, Liangshan and Honghe	Fire Festival	火把节	Huǒ Bǎ jié	Yi	5 days in Chuxiong, Liangshan and 3 days in Honghe
20 September	Nujiang		阔时节	Kuò Shí jié	Lisu	3 days in Nujiang
15th day of the 1st Lunisolar month	Dehong	Manau Festival	目瑙纵歌节	Mùnǎo Zónggē jié	Jingpo	2 days in Dehong
5th day of the 5th Lunisolar month	Wenshan		闹兜阳	Nào Dōuyáng	Miao	3 days in Wenshan, often celebrated together with Dragon Boat Festival
13 April	Dehong and Xishuangbanna	Water-Sprinkling Festival or Songkran	泼水节	Pō Shuǐ jié	Dai	2 days in Dehong and Xishuangbanna
1st day of the 10th Lunisolar month	Ngawa	Qiang New Year	羌历年	Qiānglì Nián	Qiang	5 days in Ngawa
15th to 22nd day of the 3rd Lunisolar month	Dali	Third Month Fair	三月街	Sān Yuè Jiē	Bai	7 days in Dali
3rd day of the 3rd Lunisolar month	Wenshan	Sam Nyied Sam	三月三	Sān Yuè Sān	Zhuang	3 days in Wenshan
1st day of the Yi Calendar, often falls in the 10th Lunisolar month	Chuxiong and Liangshan	Yi New Year	彝族年	Yízú Nián	Yi	5 days in Chuxiong and Liangshan
1 Shawwal of Islamic calendar	Linxia	Eid ul-Fitr	开斋节	Kāizhāi jié	Hui	3 days in Linxia
10 Dhu al-Hijjah of Islamic calendar	Linxia	Eid al-Adha or Kurban Festival	古尔邦节	Gǔ'ěrbāng jié	Hui	3 days in Linxia

In addition, the following autonomous prefectures celebrate their founding date (Chinese: 州庆纪念日; pinyin: Zhōuqìng JìNiàn Rì or 州庆日; Zhōuqìng Rì). Generally, the government takes one day off to all people working in such prefectures.

Celebrating location	Date
Chuxiong	15 April
Dali	22 November
Dehong	23 July
Dêqên	13 September
Enshi	19 August
Gannan	1 October
Garzê	24 November
Liangshan	1 October
Linxia	19 November
Ngawa	2 January
Nujiang	23 August
Qiandongnan	23 July
Qiannan	8 August
Qianxinan	1 May
Wenshan	1 April
Xiangxi	20 September
Xishuangbanna	23 January
Yanbian	3 September

== Novel holidays ==
Some Chinese young adults have begun to celebrate 11 November as the Singles' Day (Chinese: 光棍节; pinyin: guāng gùn jié) because of the many ones (1s) and many singles in the date.

Serfs' Emancipation Day, celebrated on March 28, was established in Tibet in 2009.

== See also ==
- List of annual events in China
- List of observances set by the Chinese calendar
- Public holidays in Hong Kong
- Public holidays in Macau
- Public holidays in Taiwan
