= Holidays in China =

Holidays in China may refer to:

- Traditional Chinese holidays
- Public holidays in China
- Public holidays in Taiwan
- Public holidays in Hong Kong
- Public holidays in Macau

== See also ==
- Category:Public holidays in China
