= Establishment Day =

Establishment Day may refer to:

- Hong Kong Special Administrative Region Establishment Day (July 1)
- Macau Special Administrative Region Establishment Day (December 20)
