= Jingchu Suishiji =

Historical description of holidays in China

Chinese name
- Traditional Chinese: 《荊楚歲時記》
- Simplified Chinese: 《荆楚岁时记》
- Literal meaning: Record(s) of the Seasons of Jingchu
Transcriptions
Standard Mandarin
- Hanyu Pinyin: 《Jīngchǔ suìshíjì》
- Wade–Giles: Ching-ch‘u Sui-shih Chi

Japanese name
- Kanji: 荊楚歲時記
Transcriptions
- Romanization: Keiso Saijiki

Jingchuji
- Traditional Chinese: 《荊楚記》
- Simplified Chinese: 《荆楚记》
- Literal meaning: Record(s) of Jingchu
Transcriptions
Standard Mandarin
- Hanyu Pinyin: 《Jīngchǔjì》
- Wade–Giles: Ching-ch‘u Chi

The Jingchu Suishiji, also known by various English translations, (Note: These include A Record of the Annual and Seasonal Customs of the Areas of Jing and Chu, Record of the Year and Seasons of Jing-Chu, Records of Local Conditions and Customs in Jingchu, Record of the Annual and Seasonal Customs of Jing-Chu, Festivals and Seasonal Customs of the Jing-Chu Region, Seasonal Festive Customs in the Jingchu Region, and An Account of the Seasonal Activities in the Jing-Chu Region.) is a description of holidays in central China during the 6th and 7th centuries. It was compiled by Du Gongzhan in the Sui or early Tang (early 7th century) as a revised, annotated edition of Zong Lin's mid-6th-century Record of Jingchu or Jingchuji. The original Record is now lost; the original text of the Jingchu Suishiji seems to have been lost as well, with current editions consisting of various attempts of Ming and Qing scholars to recover the text from fragments in other works.

== History ==
Zong Lin (宗懍, Zōng Lǐn, w Tsung Lin; AD 498–561) (Note: It is known Zong was born at some time around the year 500 and lived 63 years. Chapman notes some scholars date him to 502–565.) was a member of the Nanyang immigrants to Jiangling, Hubei, who composed his Record of Jingchu under the Liang. It seems likely he wrote the book after moving to Chang'an in 554. (Note: Holzman avers that Zong spent his entire life at Jiangling, despite his family's more northern origin.) Aside from the Jingchu Suishiji and other fragments, the original text is now lost.

Du Taiqing (t 杜臺卿, s 杜台卿, Dù Táiqīng, w Tu T‘ai-ch‘ing; born c. 536) drew from Zong's work in composing his own seasonal calendar, the Precious Canon of the Jade Candle (t 《玉燭寶典》, s 《玉烛宝典》, Yùzhú Bǎodiǎn, w Yü-chu Pao-tien), shortly after 581. It survives in an incomplete Japanese manuscript, probably from the 14th century.

His nephew Du Gongzhan (杜公瞻, Dù Gōngzhān, w Tu Kung-chan; died after 590) used the Precious Canon to revise and annotate Zong's text sometime in the late Sui or early Tang. Du's family came from Boling (probably Dingzhou, Hebei) and some of his notes are about the differences in the festivals' observance in northern China. The original text of this work—in which it is sometimes difficult to distinguish Zong's text from Du's emendations—seems to have been lost under the Song (10th–13th centuries). Surviving editions of the work differ greatly and appear to be Ming and Qing (14th–20th-century) attempts to recreate the work from fragments elsewhere (Note: Moriya disputes this, claiming that a 1615 edition preserves an imperfect copy of the original text.) in sources like the Yiwen Leiju and Taiping Yulan. Du died in office as the magistrate of Anyang.

== Contents ==
Jingchu was the area reckoned as the former territory of Chu, now mainly in Hubei and Hunan around the middle stretches of the Yangtze River. The Suishiji is an annotated record of its major festivals in the mid-6th to early 7th century, during the chaos of Sui's creation and collapse and just before the stability and grandeur of the Tang. The surviving 37 or so paragraphs also draw from literary sources to outline the history of the festivals as then understood. Some are traced to gods and legendary ancestors, others to agricultural rhythms, and others to historical figures or events. The work also includes irregularly observed rituals and celebrations concerning disease, bodily functions, marriage, childbirth, dancing, and the exorcism of evil spirits.

Importantly, the Jingchu Suishiji records changing Chinese rituals, cuisine, and entertainment as religious and calendrical changes led to a "new canon" of major festivals. The Chinese New Year, Lantern, Tomb Sweeping, Dragon Boat, Double Seven, Ghost, and Double Ninth Festivals all took most of their present form during the periods leading up to the composition of the Jingchu Suishiji (from the late Han to the Six Dynasties). The Double Seven and Double Ninth Festivals reflect the growing use from the late Han onward of monthly dating rather than the old sexagenary cycle of heavenly stems and earthly branches. Similarly, the new reckoning gave added importance to the proper new year festival, which added features from the old popular "new year" La sacrifices and exorcisms that had occurred in the 12th month after midwinter.

The Jingchu Suishiji is one of the first sources to record the combination of the stories of "The Cowherd and the Weaver Girl" and Zhang Qian with his magical raft. Similarly, an edition of the Jingchu Suishiji from the end of the Six Dynasties period of Chinese history is one of the few sources of the era that mention the Ghost Festival, a Buddhist holiday on the 15th day of the 7th lunar month supposedly started by the disciple Moggallāna to free his dead mother from her status as a hungry ghost. Zong quoted the apocryphal Yulanpen Sutra and described the holiday during his time: people offered temples flowers, flags, and bowls and joined monks and nuns in drumming and singing.

Du's commentary on Zong's section about the Cold Food Festival supports the idea that it derived from an old Zhou ritual about banning fire in the capital during the last month of spring. This derives, however, from an ignorance that the festival had originally been observed around midwinter and continued so as late as the Han.

== Editions ==
The best edition of the Jingchu Suishiji is that compiled as part of Mitsu Moriya's Study of China's Old Seasonal Records. It has been translated into German by Turban and into Japanese by Moriya & al., which includes helpful commentary.

== Legacy ==
The Jingchu Suishiji was very influential on writings about the seasons and festivals of China throughout the Tang and Song, being quoted greatly more than any other non-classical text.

The book is sometimes credited as the earliest reference to the Korean traditions concerning red-bean porridge and the beverages that became seju. The consumption of red-bean porridge around the new year had been common in China in order to stave off disease—particularly smallpox—spread by the pestilent son of the monster Gonggong; the practice spread to Korea under the Goryeo and has continued as part of the Korean New Year celebrations.

== See also ==
- Traditional Chinese holidays
- Public Holidays of the People's Republic and Republic of China
