= Public holidays in Taiwan =

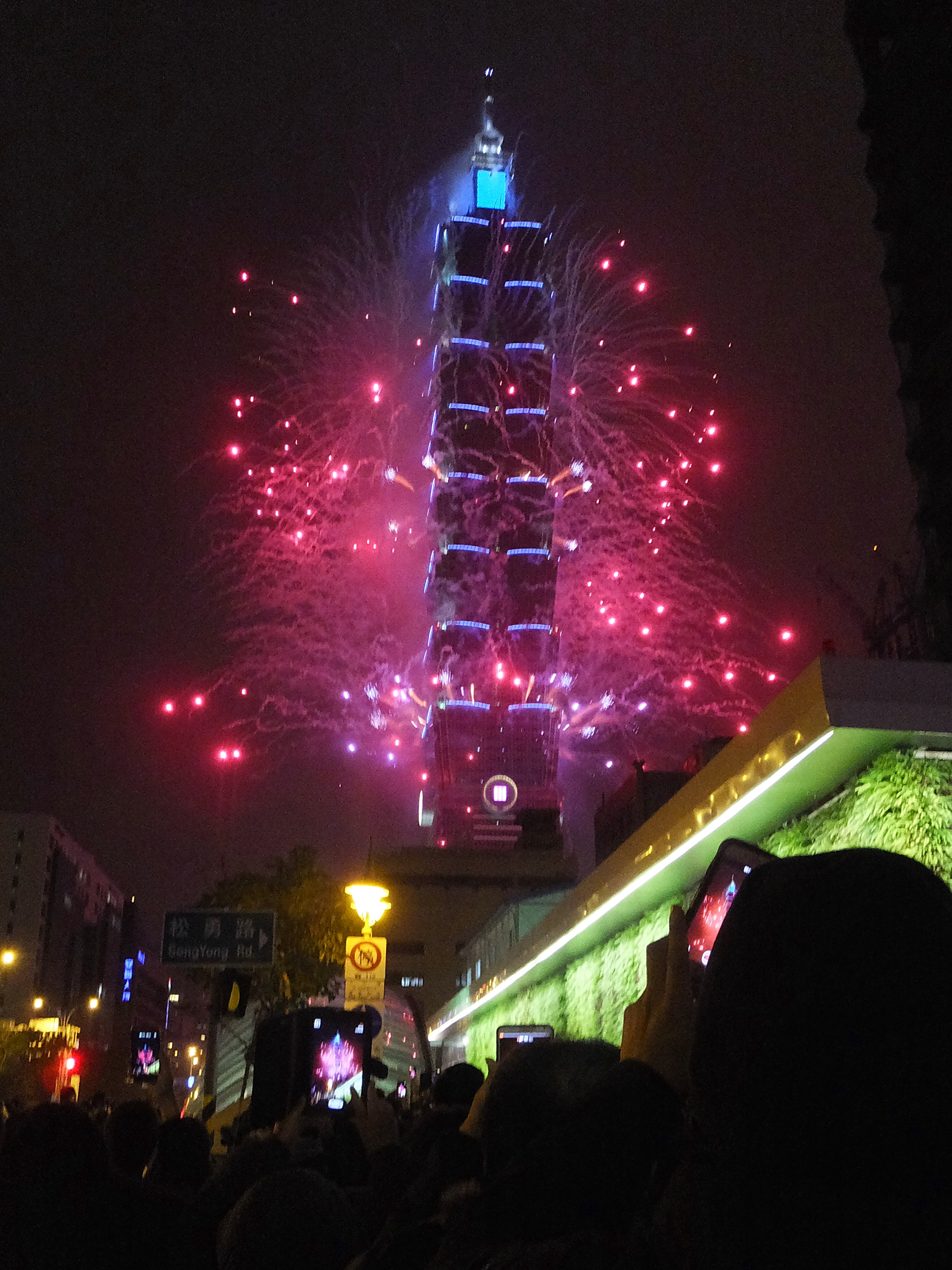
New Year's fireworks around Taipei 101.

The following are considered public holidays in Taiwan. Some are official holidays, and some are not.

== Table of Taiwan holidays ==
=== Public holidays ===
2025 Gregorian Date(s) Observed	Type of calendar followed	Date on calendar	English name	Chinese name	Remarks
January 1	Gregorian calendar	January 1	Founding of the Republic of China (also New Year's Day)	中華民國開國紀念日 / 元旦	Commemorates the establishment of the Provisional Government in Nanking.
January 25–27	Lunisolar calendar	Last day (29th/30th day) of the 12th month	Taiwanese New Year's Eve	農曆除夕	Eve of the Taiwanese New Year.
January 28 - February 2	Lunisolar calendar	First 3 working days of the 1st month	Taiwanese New Year	農曆新年/過年	Day of Taiwanese New Year.
February 28 - March 1	Gregorian calendar	February 28	Peace Memorial Day	228和平紀念日	Commemorates the February 28 Incident in 1947.
April 3 - April 6	Gregorian calendar	April 4	Children's Day	兒童節	To make known the human rights of children and to stop the abuse of children.
April 3 - April 6	Gregorian calendar	15th day after the Spring Equinox	Tomb Sweeping Day	淸明節	To remember and honour ancestors at grave sites
May 1	Gregorian calendar	May 1	Labor Day (May Day)	勞動節	Nationwide public holiday, applicable to all sectors, including public sector employees.
May 30 - June 1	Lunisolar calendar	5th day of the 5th month	Dragon Boat Festival	端午節	Commemorates the death of the patriot Qu Yuan.
September 28	Gregorian calendar	September 28	Confucius' Birthday	孔子誕辰紀念日	Teachers' Day
October 4–6	Lunisolar calendar	15th day of the 8th month	Mid-Autumn Festival	中秋節	Gathering the family together to celebrate the end of the harvest season
October 10–12	Gregorian calendar	October 10	National Day/Double Tenth Day	國慶日 / 雙十節	Commemorates the Wuchang Uprising of 1911, which began the Xinhai Revolution that led to the abolition of monarchy and establishment of a republican form of government.
October 25	Gregorian calendar	October 25	Retrocession Day and Memorial of the Victory of Guningtou, Kinmen	臺灣光復暨金門古寧頭大捷紀念日	The Republic of China resumed sovereignty over Taiwan on 25 October 1945 and claimed that Taiwan had since returned to the Republic of China. However, the said claim is in dispute. The day also coincides with the first day of Victory of Guningtou, Quemoy in 1949, which the Nationalist forces fought against the PLA from taking control of Quemoy.
December 25	Gregorian calendar	December 25	Constitution Day	行憲紀念日	Coincides with Christmas, and the anniversary of the 1947 ROC Constitution

=== Unofficial holidays ===
The following holidays are also observed on Taiwan but are not official holidays observed by civil servants of the central government. Some sectors of the workforce may have time off on some of the following holidays, such as Labor Day, Armed Forces Day, and Teachers' Day.

Gregorian calendar
Date	English name	Local name	Remarks
February 4	Farmer's Day	農民節	Lichun, the beginning of spring
March 12	Arbor Day	國父逝世紀念日	Sun Yat-sen's passing on 12 March 1925
March 29	Youth Day	靑年節	Commemorates revolutionary Tenth Uprising in 1911
May 4	Literary Day	文藝節	Commemorates May Fourth Movement
May (second Sunday)	Mother's Day	母親節	Buddha's Birthday was changed to fit the date of Mother's Day.
June 3	Opium Suppression Movement Day	禁菸節	Commemorates burning of opium in the First Opium War of 1839
August 1	Indigenous Peoples’ Day	原住民族日	On July 31, 2005, the Council of Indigenous Peoples hosted its inaugural ceremony for the rectification of the name ‘indigenous peoples.’ President Chen Shui-bien spoke at the event and declared August 1 to be Indigenous Peoples' Day. In 2016, the administration under President Tsai Ing-wen approved a proposal that designated 1 August as Indigenous Peoples' Day in Taiwan.
August 8	Father's Day	父親節	Held on August 8 because the pronunciation of 8 (八; ba) is very close to the Chinese word for “dad” (爸; ba)
September 1	Journalists' Day	記者節	Commemorates the promulgation of the Protection of Journalists and Public Opinion Organizations law in 1933
September 3	Armed Forces Day	軍人節	Honors the Republic of China Armed Forces, also Victory over Japan Day
October 21	Overseas Chinese Day	華僑節	
November 12	Sun Yat-sen's Birthday	國父誕辰紀念日	Also Doctors' Day and Cultural Renaissance Day
Winter solstice	Dongzhi Festival	冬至	
	Aboriginal Festivals	原住民族歲時祭儀	Dates to be published by the Council of Indigenous Peoples varies according to tribes

Lunar calendar
Date	English name	Local name	Remarks
15th day of 1st lunar month	Lantern Festival	元宵節	Based on Chinese calendar
15th day of 1st lunar month	Tourism Day	觀光節	Based on Chinese calendar
2nd day of 2nd lunar month	Earth God's Birthday	土地公誕辰	Based on Chinese calendar
19th day of 2nd lunar month	Kuan Yin's Birthday	觀音誕辰	Based on Chinese calendar
15th day of 3rd lunar month	God of Medicine's Birthday	保生大帝誕辰	Based on Chinese calendar
23rd day of 3rd lunar month	Matsu's Birthday	媽祖誕辰	Based on Chinese calendar
8th day of 4th lunar month	Buddha's Birthday	佛誕日	Based on Chinese calendar
13th day of 5th lunar month	Kuan Kung's Birthday	關公誕辰	Based on Chinese calendar
13th day of 5th lunar month	Cheng Huang's Birthday	城隍爺誕辰	Based on Chinese calendar
7th day of 7th lunar month	Qixi Festival	七夕	Based on Chinese calendar
15th day of 7th lunar month	Ghost Festival	中元節	Based on Chinese calendar
9th day of 9th lunar month	Double Ninth Festival	重陽節	Based on Chinese calendar
15th day of 10th lunar month	Saisiat Festival	賽夏節	Pas-ta'ai Festival of the Saisiat tribe

Before 1949, a number of public holidays were celebrated by certain ethnic minorities in regions within the ROC, which were decided by local governments and entities. Since 1949, these holidays continued to be celebrated by ethnic groups as such in Taiwan Area only.

Date	English name	Local name	Chinese name	Ethnic Groups
1.1 of Tibetan calendar	Losar	ལོ་གསར	藏曆新年	Tibetan community in Taiwan
30.6 of Tibetan calendar	Sho Dun	ཞོ་སྟོན།	雪頓節	Tibetan community in Taiwan
1.9 of Islamic calendar	Eid ul-Fitr	عيد الفطر	開齋節	Muslim community in Taiwan, not only Hui people, but also Filipino Muslim, Malay and Indonesian immigrants
10.12 of Islamic calendar	Eid al-Adha	عيد الأضحى	爾德節	Muslim community in Taiwan, not only Hui people, but also Filipino Muslim, Malay and Indonesian immigrants
3rd day of the 3rd Lunisolar month	Sam Nyied Sam	Sam Nyied Sam	三月三	Zhuang community in Taiwan

== History ==
In 2016, the Tsai Ing-wen government removed seven public holidays. The holidays were removed due to a political compromise arising from a campaign promise Tsai made while running for president that committed her government to providing two days off per week for all workers.

When implementing the change, the government faced opposition from various interests including businesses, and a compromise was reached to provide two days off per week and remove seven paid public holidays.

The removed public holidays were:

- January 2, the day after New Year's Day
- March 29, Youth Day (commemorating the Huanghuagang Uprising)
- September 3, Armed Forces Day
- September 28, Confucius' Birthday
- October 25, Retrocession Day (commemorating the end of Japanese rule of Taiwan and Penghu and the return of Taiwan to the Republic of China)
- October 31, Chiang Kai-shek's Birthday
- November 12, Sun Yat-sen's Birthday
- December 25, Constitution Day

=== Reinstatement of removed holidays in 2025 ===
A longstanding political debate over reinstating the removed public holidays was reignited during the second session of the Legislative Yuan in February, 2025. Kuomintang legislators said they would seek to reinstate the holidays by amending labor regulations. The proposal received support from a Taiwan People's Party legislator who said their party would support the change. The Democratic Progressive Party caucus suggested the proposal was populist.

On May 9, 2025, the Legislative Yuan passed the third reading of the Memorial Days and Holidays Implementation Act, upgrading the prior administrative-level regulations to legal status. The reform introduces four new national holidays: Lunar New Year's Eve, Confucius' Birthday (September 28), Taiwan Retrocession and Battle of Guningtou Memorial Day (October 25), and Constitution Day (December 25). Additionally, Labour Day (May 1), previously a holiday only for laborers, is now a national holiday for all citizens. The revised law also guarantees that the Lunar New Year break will span at least seven days, potentially extending to ten. Further adjustments include allowing Indigenous peoples to choose three holidays based on their specific traditional ceremonies. New commemorative days such as Freedom of Speech Day (April 7), Indigenous Resistance Day (June 16), and Human Rights Day (December 10) were also added.

== See also ==
- Traditional Chinese holidays
- Public holidays in China
