= List of annual events in China =

This is a list of major annual events in China.

Event	Date	Location	Established	Notes
Asian Film Awards		Hong Kong	2007	
Beijing Pop Festival		Chaoyang Park, Beijing	2005	
Being Globally Responsible Conference	May	Shanghai	2006	
China Baseball League	April		2002	
China Digital Entertainment Expo & Conference		Shanghai New International Expo Center	2004	
China International Copyright Expo		Olympic Green, Beijing	2008	
China Touring Car Championship			2003	
Chinese Football Association Footballer of the Year			1994	
Chinese New Year	January or February	Country-wide		
Double Ninth Festival	October	Country-wide		
Duanwu Festival	June	Country-wide		Also known as Dragon Boat Festival
Hong Kong International Jewellery Show		Hong Kong Convention and Exhibition Centre		
Hong Kong Jewish Film Festival	November	Hong Kong	2000	
Hong Kong Top Footballer Awards			1978	
Hush!! Full Band Festival		Macau	2005	
International Workers' Day	May 1	Country-wide		
Lantern Festival	February or March	Country-wide		
Lychee and Dog Meat Festival	June 21 - June 30	Yulin, Guangxi	June 21, 2009	
Midi Music Festival	May	Beijing, Shanghai, Shenzhen	1997	
Mukden Incident remembrance	September 18, 1931	Liaoning Province	September 18	Major cities across the country sound air-raid sirens at 10:00 am
National Day of the People's Republic of China	October 1	Country-wide		
Qingdao International Beer Festival		Qingdao, Shandong		
Qingming Festival	April	Country-wide		Also known as the Tomb Sweeping Day
Shanghai Fashion Week		Shanghai		
Shanghai International Fashion Culture Festival		Shanghai	1995	
Shanghai International Film Festival	June	Shanghai	1993	
Sho Dun Festival	August	Lhasa, Tibet	16th century	
Third Month Fair	April or May	Dali City, Yunnan	Tang dynasty	

== See also ==
- Culture of China
- Traditional Chinese holidays
- Public holidays in China
