= China Tourism Day =

Public holiday in China

- Observed by: China
- Significance: Day to commemorate Xu Xiake's Travels
- Date: 18 May
- Next time: 18 May 2027
- Frequency: Annual
- First time: 2011

The China Tourism Day is a holiday in the People's Republic of China to commemorate Xu Xiake's Travels. It is celebrated on May 19.

== establishment process ==
As early as 1987, an article in Tourism World proposed the establishment of a “China Tourism Festival”; in 1999, inspired by World Tourism Day, there were also suggestions to establish a “China Tourism Day.”

Since the mid-1990s, with the continuous expansion of the comprehensive benefits of tourism, various regions have engaged in competition over “famous figures” and “famous sites.” For example, Shandong, Hubei, and Henan competed over the legacy of Zhuge Liang, while Yunnan, Sichuan, and Tibet contested the claim to be the authentic “Shangri-La.” Zhejiang and Jiangsu, as the earliest proponents of “China Tourism Day,” also have close historical ties to the Ming Dynasty traveler Xu Xiake, and their consideration of the date for Tourism Day was likewise influenced by similar factors.

On November 6, 2000, Ninghai County in Zhejiang, in the name of the Ninghai Xu Xiake Tourism Club, issued the Xu Xiake Tourism Club Declaration, formally proposing for the first time nationwide that May 19 be designated as “China Tourism Day.”

On May 19, 2002, the first China (Ninghai) Xu Xiake Travel Festival was held. Ninghai has since hosted eight consecutive Xu Xiake Travel Festivals. At each festival, representatives have called for the establishment of May 19—the opening date of The Travel Diaries of Xu Xiake—as “China Tourism Day.”

In October 2003, Ma Xiaohui, then Deputy Secretary of the Ninghai County Party Committee, published an article titled “Ninghai Calls for China Tourism Day” in Macao Monthly, gaining consensus in Hong Kong and Macao.

On the morning of May 17, 2004, Ninghai held the “Ten Cities, One Hundred Cars” contemporary Xu Xiake travel launch ceremony. More than 100 drivers from ten cities, including Shanghai, Nanjing, Suzhou, Wuxi, Hangzhou, Ningbo, Wenzhou, Quzhou, Fuzhou, and Xiamen, participated and jointly issued a proposal to designate May 19 as “China Tourism Day.”

On May 18, 2005, Ninghai organized the “Retracing Xu Xiake’s Route, Exploring Lianghuang Mountain” event. A total of 519 travel enthusiasts from six provinces and one municipality in East China collectively read a proposal advocating for the establishment of May 19—the opening date of The Travel Diaries of Xu Xiake—as “China Tourism Day.”

== History ==
The China Tourism Day was officially established by the State Council of China in 2011. The China Tourism Day launches an event theme every year.

- 2011: "Read Ten Thousand Books, Travel Ten Thousand Miles"
- 2012: “Healthy Life, Happy Travel”
- 2013: “Leisure benefits the people, beautiful China”
- 2014: “Happy Tourism, Public Welfare and Benefiting the People”
- 2015: “New Normal, New Tourism”
- 2016: “Tourism promotes development, tourism promotes poverty alleviation, and tourism promotes peace”
- 2017: “Travel makes life happier”
- 2018: "Whole-region Tourism, Better Life"
- 2019: "Culture and Tourism Integration for a Better Life"
- 2020: "Integration of Culture and Tourism, Better Life"
- 2021: "Green Development, Better Life"
- 2022: “Experience Chinese culture and enjoy a wonderful journey”
- 2023: “A Beautiful China, a Happy Journey”
- 2024: “Travel around China and live a happy life”
