= List of observances set by the Chinese calendar =

The traditional Chinese holidays are an essential part of harvests or prayer offerings. The most important Chinese holiday is the Chinese New Year (Spring Festival), which is also celebrated in overseas ethnic Chinese communities (for example in Malaysia, Thailand, or the USA). Traditional holidays vary from region to region, but most are scheduled according to the Chinese calendar; exceptions, like the Qingming and winter solstice days, fall on the respective jieqi (solar terms) in the agricultural calendar.

== Four Traditional Festivals ==
China's four recognized festivals are the Spring Festival (Chinese New Year), the Qingming Festival, the Dragon Boat Festival, and the Mid-Autumn Festival.

== List ==
Chinese lunar date		Gregorian date	English name	Chinese name	Remarks
Month	Day	Gregorian date	English name	Chinese name	Remarks
1	1st	17 February 2026	Chinese New Year (Spring Festival)	• 農曆新年 / 农历新年 • 春節 / 春节 • 大年初一	Set off fireworks after midnight; visit family members
1	7th	23 February 2026	Renri	人日	
1	15th	3 March 2026	Lantern Festival	• 元宵節 / 元宵节	Lantern parade and lion dance celebrating the first full moon. Eating tangyuan. This day is also the last day of new year celebration. This is Tourism Day in Taiwan
2	2nd	20 March 2026	Zhonghe Festival (Blue Dragon Festival)	• 中和節 / 中和节 • 青龍節 / 青龙节	Eat Chinese pancakes (Chun bing, 春餅) and noodles, clean the house. Also known as Dragon Raising its Head. This is Earth God's Birthday in Taiwan
At the Qingming solar term, solar longitude of 15°, 104th day after Dongzhi (winter solstice)		5 April 2026	Qingming Festival (Tomb Sweeping Festival, Tomb Sweeping Day, Clear and Bright Festival)	清明節 / 清明节	Visit, clean, and make offerings at ancestral gravesites, spring outing
105th day after Dongzhi		6 April 2026	Cold Food Festival (Hanshi Festival)	寒食节	
3	3rd	19 April 2026	Shangsi Festival	上巳節 / 上巳节	Traditional Chinese Women's Day, also known as 婦女節 / 妇女节 (fùnǚjié) or Double Third Festival.
3	3rd	19 April 2026	Sam Nyied Sam	三月三	Celebrated by the Zhuang people, an ethnic minority.
3	15th	1 May 2026	God of Medicine's Birthday	保生大帝誕辰	Public holiday in Taiwan
3	23rd	9 May 2026	Matsu's Birthday (Tin Hau Festival)	媽祖誕辰	Public holiday in Taiwan
4	8th	24 May 2026	Buddha's Birthday	佛誕 / 佛诞	Visit Buddhist temple, offer food to the monks
4	8th	24 May 2026 – 28 May 2026	Cheung Chau Bun Festival	包山節/長洲太平清醮	
5	5th	19 June 2026	Duanwu Festival (Dragon Boat Festival)	端午節 / 端午节	Dragon boat race; eat sticky rice wrapped in lotus leaves (zongzi, 粽子); drink yellow rice wine; related to the Legend of the White Snake. This festival commemorates the ancient poet Qu Yuan
5	13th	27 June 2026	Kuan Kung's Birthday and Cheng Huang's Birthday	關公誕辰	Celebrated in Taiwan
6	6th	19 July 2026	Double Sixth Festival	六月六 / 天贶节	
6	24th or 25th	6 August 2026 – 8 August 2026	Torch Festival	火把节	
7	7th	19 August 2026	Qixi Festival (The Night of Sevens, Magpie Festival, Chinese Valentine's Day)	七夕	According to legend, the goddess Zhinü fell in love with the farmer boy Niulang, but he was disapproved of by her mother goddess. As punishment, they were separated by the Milky Way and could only meet once a year on this night.
7	15th night (14th in parts of southern China)	27 August 2026	Ghost Festival	中元節 / 中元节	Burn fake paper money and make offerings to ancestors and the dead to comfort them in the afterlife and keep them from troubling the living.
8	15th	25 September 2026	Mid-Autumn Festival (Moon Festival)	中秋節 / 中秋节	Eat mooncake, family reunion meal, related to the legend of Chang E and the Jade Rabbit, also called "Chinese Thanksgiving".
8	16th	26 September 2026	Monkey King Festival	齊天大聖千秋	
8	26th	6 October 2026	Food Extermination Day	绝粮日	Commemorate when Nurhaci's troops ran out of food, Northeast China specific
Eve of the 9th month; goes on for nine days		10 October 2026 – 18 October 2026	Nine Emperor Gods Festival		
9	9th	18 October 2026	Double Ninth Festival (Chongyang Festival)	重陽節 / 重阳节	Autumn outing and mountain climbing, some Chinese also visit the graves of their ancestors to pay their respects.
10	1st		Winter Clothes Festival	寒衣節	
10	15th	23 November 2026	Saisiat Festival	賽夏節	Pas-taai Festival of the Saisiat tribe in Taiwan
At the Dongzhi solar term, solar longitude of 270°, the day of winter solstice		22 December 2026	Dongzhi Festival (Winter Solstice Festival)	冬至	Have Tangyuan and Jiuniang and perform ancestor worship, Feast day, family gatherings, also named "Chinese Thanksgiving"
12	8th	15 January 2027	Laba Festival	臘八節 / 腊八节	This is the day the Buddha attained enlightenment. People usually eat Laba congee, which is made of mixed grains and fruits. Beginning of the preparation for Chinese new year.
12	23rd/24th	30 January 2027 (Northern China); 31 January 2027 (Southern China)	Little New Year	小年	Honoring of Kitchen God
Last day of lunar year		5 February 2027	Chinese New Year's Eve	• 除夕 • 大年夜	

== Public holidays ==
Traditional holidays are generally celebrated in Chinese-speaking regions. For the most part however, only Chinese New Year, Qingming Festival, the Dragon Boat Festival and Mid-Autumn Festival are statutory public holidays. This is the case in both mainland China and Taiwan whilst Hong Kong and Macau also observe Buddha's Birthday and Chung Yeung Festival. In Singapore, Chinese New Year is the only traditional Chinese public holiday, likewise with Malaysia, Indonesia & Brunei as well as Mauritius.

Each region has its own holidays on top of this condensed traditional Chinese set. Mainland China and Taiwan observe patriotic holidays, Hong Kong and Macau observe Christian holidays, and Malaysia and Singapore celebrate Malay and Indian festivals.

- Public holidays in the People's Republic of China
  - Public holidays in Hong Kong
  - Public holidays in Macau
- Public holidays in the Republic of China
  - Public holidays in Taiwan (including unofficial holidays)
- Public holidays in Singapore
- Public holidays in Malaysia
- Public holidays in Indonesia
- Public holidays in Brunei
- Public holidays in Mauritius
- List of festivals in China

== See also ==
- Jingchu Suishiji, an important text on the transition from ancient Chinese festivals to the present traditional ones
- Culture of China
- List of annual events in China
- Joss paper
