= National Law Publicity Day =

- Observed by: China
- Significance: Day to raise awareness of legal issues
- Date: 4 December
- Next time: 4 December 2026
- Frequency: Annual
- First time: 2001

The National Law Publicity Day is a national legal publicity day established by the government of the People's Republic of China on December 4 of each year since 2001. December 4 is also the date of promulgation and implementation of the current constitution.

== Introduction ==
The Central Committee of the Chinese Communist Party and the State Council forwarded the "Fourth Five-Year Plan of the Publicity Department and the Ministry of Justice on Carrying Out Legal Publicity and Education Among Citizens" on April 26, 2001, which determined:

December 4th, the date on which my country's current Constitution came into effect, will be designated as the annual National Law Publicity Day.

== Themes ==
years	theme
2016	Vigorously promote the spirit of the rule of law and coordinate the advancement of the "Four Comprehensives" strategic layout
2015	Upholding the spirit of the Constitution and promoting innovative, coordinated, green, open, and shared development.
2014	Upholding the spirit of the Constitution and building a rule-of-law China (Since 2014, December 4th of each year has also been National Constitution Day).
2013	Vigorously promote the spirit of the rule of law and jointly build the great Chinese dream
2012	Upholding the spirit of the Constitution and serving scientific development
2011	Deepen the study and publicity of the Constitution and vigorously promote the spirit of the rule of law.
2010	Promote the spirit of the rule of law and foster social harmony
2009	Strengthen legal publicity and education to serve economic and social development.
2008	Upholding the spirit of the rule of law and serving scientific development
2007	Promote the spirit of the rule of law and advance the rule of law in the country
2006	Implement the Fifth Five-Year Plan for Legal Education and Promote the Building of a Harmonious Society
2005	Upholding the spirit of the Constitution and building a harmonious society
2004	Promote the spirit of the Constitution and enhance the concept of the rule of law
2003	Rule of law and governance for the people
2002	Study and publicize the Constitution to advance the development of democracy and the rule of law
2001	Strengthen constitutional awareness and advance the rule of law

== Activities ==
On National Law Publicity Day, political and legal departments at all levels across the country carry out various forms of legal publicity activities. Since 2009, the Supreme People's Court has held a public open day every year on National Law Publicity Day. Since 2013, the President of the Supreme People's Court has personally participated in the public open day activities. On National Legal Publicity Day in 2014, the Supreme People's Court invited the parties involved in wrongful convictions to participate in the public open day activities for the first time. The invited parties involved in wrongful convictions were Zhang Gaoping and Zhang Hui, the parties involved in the rape and murder case of an uncle and nephew in Zhejiang.
