= Public holidays in Hong Kong =

Public holidays and statutory holidays in Hong Kong are holidays designated by the Government of Hong Kong. They allow workers rest from work, usually in conjunction with special occasions. Public holidays in Hong Kong consist of a mix of traditional Chinese and Western holidays, such as Lunar New Year, the Mid-Autumn Festival, and the Dragon Boat Festival, along with Christmas and Easter. Other public holidays include National Day (1 October) and Hong Kong Special Administrative Region Establishment Day (1 July).

Public holidays and statutory holidays are an important part of life in Hong Kong, allowing people to take a break from work and celebrate important cultural and national events.

== List of holidays ==
The 17 public holidays (Chinese: 公眾假期), also called bank holidays (Chinese: 銀行假期), are set by the General Holidays Ordinance.

According to the Employment Ordinance, 15 of the 17 public holidays are compulsory for employers to give to the employees. These 15 holidays are known as statutory holidays (Chinese: 法定假期), labour holidays (Chinese: 勞工假期), or factory holidays (Chinese: 工廠假期). These are highlighted in beige below.

Public holidays in Hong Kong
| Date | Name in English | Name in Chinese | Remarks |
|---|---|---|---|
| 1 January | New Year's Day | 元旦新年 (officially 一月一日) | |
| 1st day of 1st month (Lunar calendar) | Lunar New Year (specifically the Chinese New Year) | 農曆年初一 | Usually occurs in late January or early February; the most important of the traditional holidays |
| 2nd day of the 1st month (Lunar calendar) | Second day of Lunar New Year | 農曆年初二 | |
| 3rd day of the 1st month (Lunar calendar) | Third day of Lunar New Year | 農曆年初三 | |
| 15 days after the March Equinox | Ching Ming Festival | 清明節 | Usually the 4th or 5th of April; for paying respect to one's ancestors |
| 2 days before Easter (see Computus) | Good Friday | 耶穌受難節 | |
| Day before Easter | Day following Good Friday (Holy Saturday) | 耶穌受難節翌日 | |
| Day after Easter | Easter Monday | 復活節星期一 | |
| 1 May | Labour Day | 勞動節 | |
| 8th day of the 4th month (Lunar calendar) | Buddha's Birthday | 佛誕 | Usually occurs in May; new holiday established in 1998 (general not statutory) |
| 5th day of the 5th month (Lunar calendar) | Dragon Boat Festival (Tuen Ng Festival) | 端午節 | Usually occurs in June; day for patriotic remembrance, eating rice dumplings and dragon boat races |
| 1 July | Hong Kong Special Administrative Region Establishment Day | 香港特別行政區成立紀念日 | |
| 16th day of the 8th month (Lunar calendar) | Day following the Mid-Autumn Festival | 中秋節翌日 | Usually occurs in September; important autumn celebration of harvest and togetherness, with the lighting of lanterns, eating of mooncakes and observation of the moon |
| 1 October | National Day | 中華人民共和國國慶日 | |
| 9th day of the 9th month (Lunar calendar) | Chung Yeung Festival | 重陽節 | Usually occurs in October; day for honouring the elderly and the deceased, and for mountain climbing |
| 25 December | Christmas Day | 聖誕節 | Employers can choose to observe the 21 or 22 December Winter Solstice (冬至) as a statutory holiday instead |
| 26 December | Day following Christmas (Boxing Day) | 聖誕節翌日 | |

== Operation of statutory holidays ==
If an employer states in the employment contract that its employees are only allowed to take statutory holidays, it is legal to require the employees to work on public holidays that are not statutory holidays (i.e. Good Friday, the day following Good Friday and Easter Monday) without salary or leave compensations.

Traditionally, statutory holidays are an entitlement associated with blue-collar jobs in fields such as manufacturing, construction, textiles and clothing, repairing, mass media, security, cleaning, transportation, logistics, distribution, retailing, catering, labourer, hotel and customer service.

== Previous holidays ==
Under the administration of the United Kingdom prior to 1997, the Queen's Birthday was a public holiday observed in the second Monday of June. It was replaced by the Hong Kong Special Administrative Region Establishment Day after the transfer of sovereignty to the People's Republic of China. Similarly, Commonwealth Day was a school holiday prior to the transfer of sovereignty, as was the birthday anniversary of Sun Yat Sen. The anniversary of the liberation of Hong Kong (Chinese: 重光紀念日) was observed on 30 August, but was later switched in 1968 to the last Monday in August. After the transfer of sovereignty, it was replaced with the anniversary of the victory in the Second Sino-Japanese War which was celebrated on the third monday of August before being itself replaced by Buddha's Birthday and Labour Day in 1999. The anniversary was also reintroduced as a one-off holiday in 2015 to commemorate the 70th anniversary of victory in the Second Sino-Japanese War.

== Weekends and days in lieu ==
According to Hong Kong laws, when a designated public holiday falls on a Sunday or on the same day of another holiday, the immediate following weekday would be a public holiday. However, there are exceptions; for example, as Lunar New Year 2007 falls on a Sunday (18 February), the government have designated the Saturday directly before (17 February) as a public holiday. However, this does not apply to Saturdays, and when a non-statutory public holiday falls on a Saturday, the public holiday is lost to people that do not work on Saturdays.

In general, if a statutory holiday falls on the employee's rest day, the employer is committed to giving a day off-in-lieu at a following day which is not the employee's rest day. For example, under the 5-day work week system, if a statutory holiday falls on a Saturday, the employee can be entitled to a day off-in-lieu. This is not true for non-statutory public holidays which are lost to people that do not work on Saturday.

== See also ==
- Traditional Chinese holidays
- Public holidays in Macau
