= Confucius' Birthday =

Public holiday in Hong Kong and Taiwan

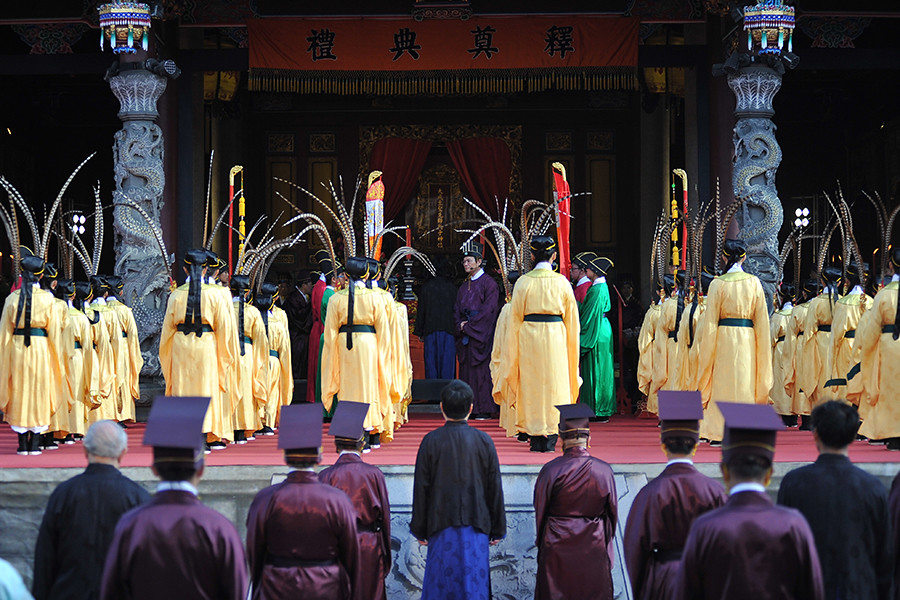
Birthday ceremony held at Confucius Temple of Taipei, Taiwan. Photo taken in 2016.

Confucius’ Birthday (Chinese: 孔子誕辰 / 孔子诞辰, Mandarin pinyin: Kǒngzǐ Dànchén), falls on the 27th day of the eighth lunar month of the Chinese calendar. It is officially celebrated on Taiwan as "Teachers' Day" on September 28, and in Hong Kong on the third Sunday of September as "Confucius Day", though the traditional date is also often observed. Mainland China observes a "Teachers' Day" on September 10 to celebrate the efforts of today's teachers, and there is a legislative effort underway to move that to September 28.

Many countries with Confucian cultures hold commemorations each year, especially mainland China, Macau, Taiwan, Hong Kong and South Korea. The birth of Confucius is not a public holiday, but it is an official public holiday for workers (not including teachers) in Taiwan, known as Teachers’ Day. In October 2006, Hong Kong officially commenced celebrating the birth date of Confucius. The roots of this traditional ceremony can be found as far back in the time of the Zhou dynasty, and appeals to both foreign tourists and local people to this day.

== Celebrations at the birthplace of Confucius ==
Festivals are held to celebrate the birth of Confucius all across China, including at his birthplace in Shandong Province. Among the many attendees of the ceremonies at the Temple of Confucius in Qufu are scholars, notable people, and descendants of Confucius.

During the festival at the Qufu temple there are many activities and entertainments, including musical performances and dancing from ancient times. In the famous Yi Dance, the dancers wear clothes from the Song and Ming dynasty, with yellow silk robes, blue waistbands, and black hats. The ceremonial music, played with traditional Chinese instruments, is known as “The Sound of Peace”. The musicians wear the clothes of the Ming dynasty, with red robes and black hats. In addition to these performances, are calligraphy demonstrations and exhibitions, with many people in traditional costumes. Tourists are welcome to attend and enter the tombs of Confucius and his descendants, as well as explore his hometown and the Confucius Temple.
