= National Fitness Day =

Annual observance in China

- Observed by: China
- Significance: Day to commemorate the opening day of the 2008 Beijing Olympic Games
- Date: 8 August
- Next time: 8 August 2026
- Frequency: Annual
- First time: 2009

The National Fitness Day is a national sports festival established in the People's Republic of China in 2009 to commemorate the opening day of the 2008 Beijing Olympic Games. It is celebrated annually on 8 August. The revised Sports Law of the People's Republic of China, which came into effect in 2023, designates the week containing National Fitness Day (August 8) as "Sports Promotion Week."

== History ==
On January 7, 2009, the State Council of China approved the General Administration of Sport of China's "Request for Designation of August 8 as 'National Fitness Day'", establishing the status of "National Fitness Day" as a national sports festival. On January 13, 2009, the General Administration of Sport of China held a press conference in Beijing to announce this news. On July 28, 2009, the State General Administration of Sport unveiled the logo and theme slogan for the National Fitness Day activities. Yin Maozhen, an amateur art design enthusiast from Mudanjiang City, Heilongjiang Province, designed two groups of 8s to form two fitness figures of men and women, which stood out. The theme slogans selected a group of three, namely "Fitness every day, happiness every day", "Good physique, good life", and "National Fitness, you and I together". The first-place winner, Wang Yuhua, came from Huxian County, Xi'an City, Shaanxi Province. On August 30, 2009, the State Council issued the National Fitness Regulations, which clearly stipulates that August 8 of each year is National Fitness Day, and public sports facilities should be open to the public free of charge on National Fitness Day.
