= China Space Day =

Annual observance in China

- Observed by: China
- Significance: Day to commemorate China's space achievements
- Date: 24 April
- Next time: 24 April 2026
- Frequency: Annual
- First time: 2016

The China Space Day is a space-related holiday in the People's Republic of China, which is celebrated on April 24th every year. The holiday was established in 2016. On this day, the China National Space Administration holds activities related to the theme of space.

== History ==
At the Second Session of the 11th National Committee of the Chinese People's Political Consultative Conference held in 2009, CPPCC member Liang Xiaohong first proposed the "Proposal on Establishing a 'China Space Day'". From 2009 to 2013, he submitted the "Proposal on Establishing a 'China Space Day'" at the CPPCC National Committee meeting every year. The proposed date was October 15th every year, which is the day when Yang Liwei, the first Chinese astronaut, entered space for the first time aboard the Shenzhou 5 crewed spacecraft. In August 2013, the proposal received a reply from the relevant national departments, and the State Administration of Science, Technology and Industry for National Defense actively promoted the development of this work. On March 8, 2016, the State Council of China decided to establish April 24 of each year as China Space Day starting in 2016. The reason for choosing this day is that April 24, 1970 was the day that China's first artificial Earth satellite, Dong Fang Hong 1, was successfully launched.

On April 24, 2016, the first China Space Day, Chinese Communist Party General Secretary Xi Jinping issued instructions to express his high respect to the personnel who have contributed to the development of the space industry over the past 60 years. He stressed that the vast number of space science and technology workers should firmly grasp strategic opportunities, adhere to innovation-driven development, bravely climb the peak of science and technology, write a new chapter in China's space industry, and make greater contributions to serving the overall development of the country and improving human well-being. He said that the purpose of establishing China Space Day is to remember history, inherit the spirit, inspire the enthusiasm of the whole people, especially young people, to admire science, explore the unknown and dare to innovate, and gather powerful strength for realizing the Chinese dream of the great rejuvenation of the Chinese nation.

== Themes ==
Each China Space Day has an officially announced theme slogan, and information about China's space activities is often released for the first time during the China Space Day activities.

Year	Theme	Region	Important announcements	Ref.
2016	"The Chinese Dream, the Space Dream"	Beijing	China's Mars exploration mission was officially approved.	
2017	"Spaceflight Creates a Better Life"	Xi'an	—	
2018	"Building a New Era of Aerospace Together"	Harbin	The selection of the third batch of reserve astronauts was launched, and a creative design competition for crewed lunar landing and ascent vehicles was held.	
2019	"Pursuing the Dream of Spaceflight: Cooperation and Win-Win"	Changsha	—	
2020	"Promoting the spirit of spaceflight and embracing the vast universe"	Fuzhou	China’s first Mars exploration mission was named Tianwen-1	
2021	"Setting Sail to Pursue Dreams in the Heavens"	Nanjing	China’s first Mars rover was named Zhurong	
2022	"Spaceflight Ignites Dreams"	Hainan	—	
2023	"Investigating things to gain knowledge and questioning the heavens."	Hefei	China released its first Mars exploration global image map	
2024	"Gazing upon the vast expanse of Chu, let us together admire the Milky Way."	Wuhan		
2025	"The bright moon rises over the sea, and the Milky Way is embraced in the heavens."	Shanghai	Results of the application for international loan of lunar samples from Chang'e-5, results of the application for international cooperation of Chang'e-8, and announcement of international cooperation of Tianwen-3	
