= National Defense Education Day =

- Observed by: China
- Significance: Day to enhance national defense education
- Date: Third Saturday of September
- Next time: 19 September 2026
- Frequency: Annual
- First time: 2001

The National Defense Education Day is a theme activity day in the People's Republic of China set on the third Saturday of September every year. Its purpose is to carry out activities such as publicity on national defense knowledge to the masses. Moreover, air raid sirens will be sounded in some areas such as Beijing, Shanghai and Guangzhou. It was established in 2001.
