= Being Globally Responsible Conference =

Being Globally Responsible Conference (BGRC; simplified Chinese: 企业社会责任全球论坛; traditional Chinese: 企業社會責任全球論壇) was an annual, 2-day corporate social responsibility (CSR) event held in May at China Europe International Business School (CEIBS) in Shanghai, China. Activities during the event included keynote speeches, discussion panel, and workshops surrounding a designated theme. It was initiated by a CEIBS MBA student Sam Lee in 2006. It was the earliest and largest MBA student organized international CSR conference in Asia-Pacific and a flagship event of CEIBS MBA. Students from mainland China, Hong Kong, Taiwan, Japan, South Korea, Thailand, India, Singapore, the Philippines, Malaysia, Australia, Spain, Denmark, and the United States attended the conference.

== Past conferences ==
=== Evolution of BGRC ===
Since its incubation, BGRC has expanded throughout the years:
1st BGRC (2006)- 3 days conference held in June. All 300 participants reached ‘Shanghai Consensus 2006’, agreeing to terms such as not working for companies that are irresponsible in an environmental or social context.
2nd BGRC (2007)- 3 days conference held in May. Participants included 150 MBA students from over 20 business schools in Asia-Pacific area and over 50 business professional and NGO representatives.
3rd BGRC (2008)- 3 day conference held in June. For the first time, there were students from international schools. Attendees included MBA students from 22 domestic and 17 international schools.
4th BGRC (2009)- 2 day conference held in June. BGRC Invited 46 local and global top business schools to participate. For the first time, it had an exclusive Live Broadcasting media web page reporting the event (by Tencent). There were also added activities such as a student essay competition and interactive gaming.
5th BGRC (2010)- 2 day conference held in May. At this event, Green Campus, a committee geared towards turning CEIBS into an exemplary institution in sustainable and environmental issues, was introduced. Activities also included photographic exhibitions and environment promotion movie shows.

=== Past themes ===
2007- Responsible Leaders, Building a Sustainable Future
2008- New horizon, better world, highlighted topics included environmental protection, poverty reduction and social entrepreneurship
2009- Make a Difference, encapsulated the message of how to empower the individual to take measures that are implementable and quantifiable in the area of sustainability
2010- Better City, Better Life, focused on social value of sustainable development. This was tied to 2010 Shanghai EXPO
