= Anniversary of the Chinese Communist Party =

Annual commemorative day

Anniversary of the founding of the Chinese Communist Party 中国共产党诞生纪念日
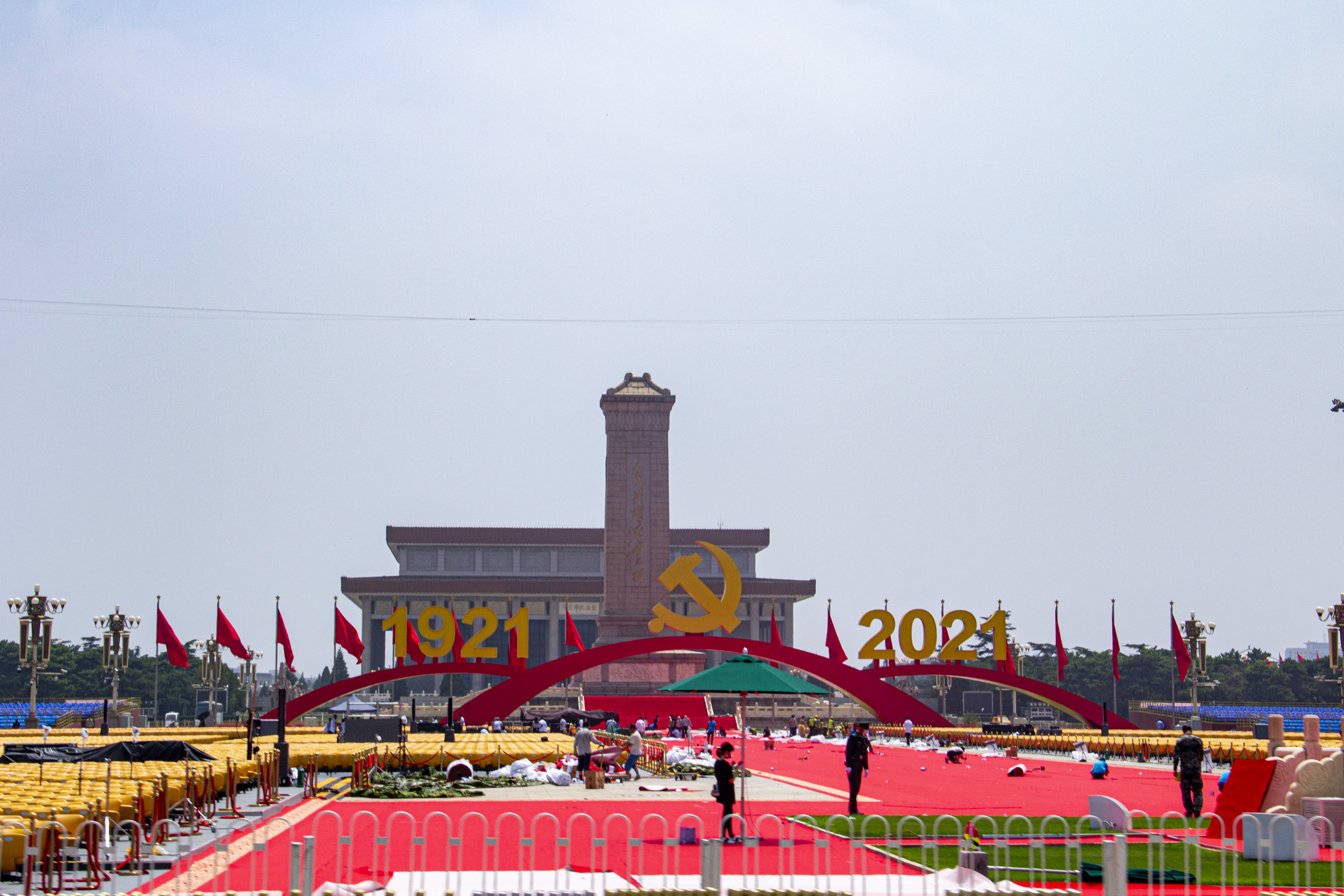
- The scenery of decorations at Tiananmen Square on 30 June 2021
- Observed by: People's Republic of China
- Type: Historical
- Significance: Anniversary day of the Chinese Communist Party
- Celebrations: Festivities
- Date: 1 July
- Next time: 1 July 2027
- Frequency: Annual
- First time: 1 July 1941

The anniversary of the founding of the Chinese Communist Party, also known as the Party Founding Day, or the July 1 founding day, is a commemorative day established to commemorate the 1921 founding of the Chinese Communist Party (CCP).

In 1941, the Central Committee of the Chinese Communist Party officially set the celebration date as July 1 of each year. After the founding of the People's Republic of China, this anniversary became a national holiday, though it is not a legal holiday. Around July 1 of each year, the CCP organizations at all levels carry out party member education and commemorative activities. In some special years such as the 70th, 80th and 90th anniversaries, the CCP Central Committee holds a commemorative meeting around July 1, where the CCP General Secretary delivers a speech. The spirit of his speech is about the learning content of party member education.

The first to commemorate the founding of the CCP was the Communist International. In 1936, the Communist International held a series of activities to commemorate the 15th anniversary of the founding of the CCP. In 1938, the Yan'an Soviet needed to establish a date to celebrate the 17th anniversary of the founding of the CCP. However, the representatives of the 1st CCP National Congress in Yan'an, such as Mao Zedong and Dong Biwu, only remembered that the 1st National Congress was held in July, but could not remember the specific date, so they decided to use July 1 as the anniversary. In June 1941, the CCP Central Committee issued an instruction to commemorate the 20th anniversary of the founding of the CCP, and officially established July 1 as the anniversary of the founding of the CCP. After investigation, the opening date of the 1st National Congress of the CCP was officially confirmed as July 23, 1921 in 1981. The date of the anniversary of the founding of the CCP was not corrected and was still celebrated on July 1.

== History ==
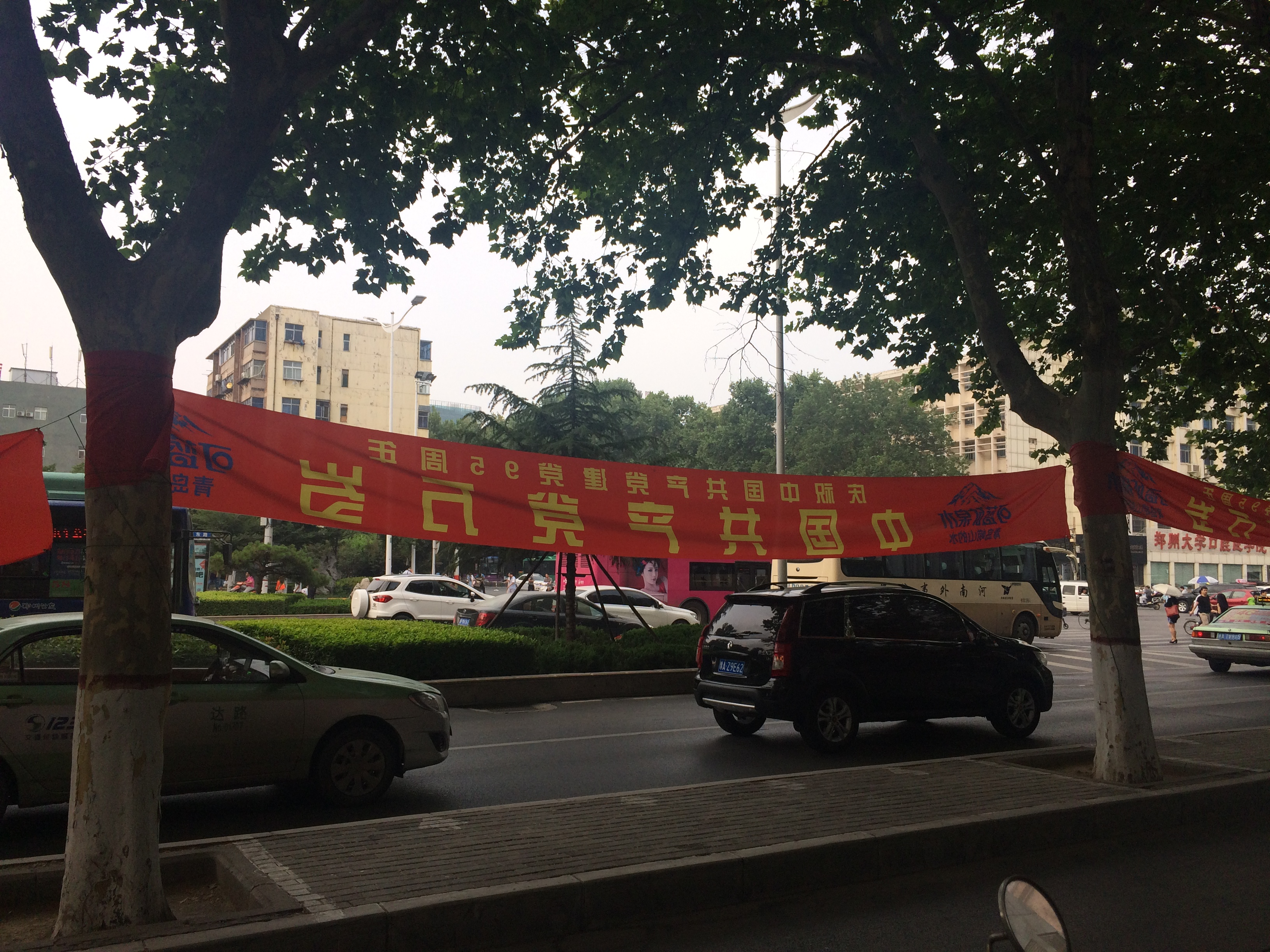
On July 1, 2016, celebratory banners on the streets read "Long Live the Chinese Communist Party" to celebrate the 95th anniversary of the founding of the CCP.

The 1st National Congress of the Chinese Communist Party was held in Shanghai on July 23, 1921. Because spies broke into the venue on the evening of July 30, the delegates moved to Nanhu Lake in Jiaxing, Zhejiang. and held the last day of the meeting on a cruise ship. (Note: The date of the last day of the meeting is conflicting, see the entry "1st National Congress of the Chinese Communist Party") Chinese academic circles believe that the convening of the 1st National Congress of the CCP marked the "formal establishment" of the party. Therefore, July 23, 1921, is also regarded as the birthday of the CCP. (Note: Another view is that the establishment of the Shanghai Communist Group in the summer of 1920 marked the founding of the Chinese Communist Party.)

The first to commemorate the founding of the CCP was the Communist International. In 1936, the Communist International held a series of activities to commemorate the 15th anniversary of the founding of the CCP. July 1 was used as the anniversary of the birth of the party because the delegates failed to remember the specific time of the meeting when the commemorative activities were carried out in the early days, and there was no condition to strictly verify through archival materials during the war years, so it was an expedient measure. In 1936, the magazine "Communist International" published a series of articles commemorating the founding of the CCP including "Recollections of the First Congress" published by Chen Tanqiu, a representative of the 1st National Congress. In his article, he mentioned that the party's 1st National Congress opened at the end of July 1921, but did not mention the specific date. The first leader of the CCP to propose to commemorate July 1 as the party's birthday was Mao Zedong. In 1938, the Yan'an Soviet needed to establish a date to celebrate the 17th anniversary of the founding of the CCP, but Mao Zedong and Dong Biwu, representatives of the 1st National Congress in Yan'an at the time, only remembered that the 1st National Congress was held in July, but failed to remember the specific date. In May 1938, Mao Zedong proposed in his speech "On Protracted War" at the Yan'an Anti-Japanese War Research Conference that "July 1 this year is the 17th anniversary of the founding of the Chinese Communist Party." This was the first time that a CCP leader proposed "July 1" as the anniversary of the party's founding. In June 1941, the CCP Central Committee issued a directive to commemorate the 20th anniversary of the founding of the CCP, officially establishing July 1 as the anniversary of the founding of the CCP.

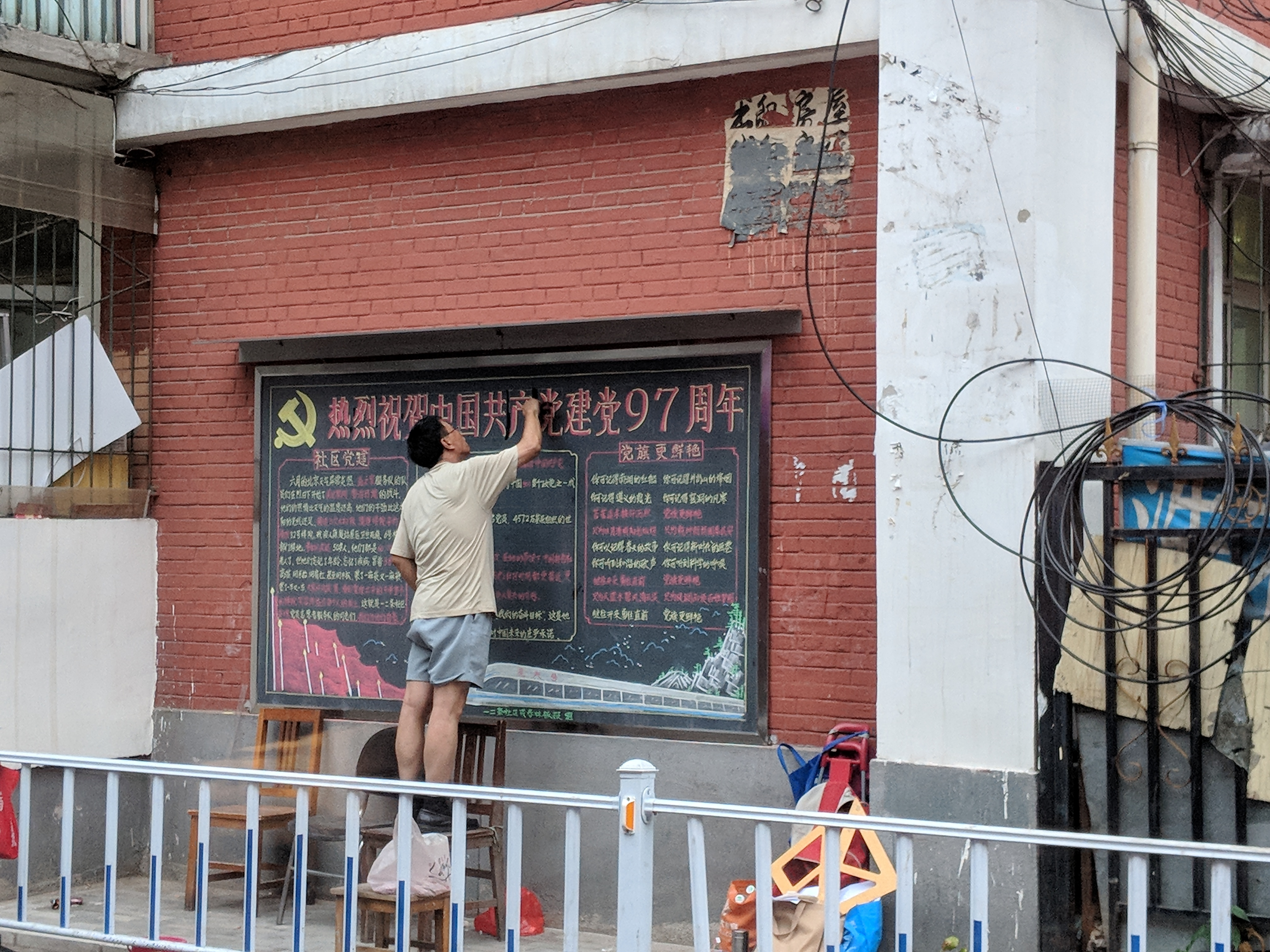
A man making bulletin celebrating 97th anniversary of foundation of Chinese Communist Party in 2018.

The Chinese Communist Party was founded with the help of the Communist International. In its early years, it accepted the leadership of the Third International. Therefore, in addition to keeping a copy of the original archives of its 1st National Congress, the CCP also submitted a copy to the Communist International for record. The original archives kept by the party were lost during the Chinese Civil War, while the original archives kept by the Communist International were preserved in the Soviet Union. In January 1957, the Central Committee of the Communist Party of the Soviet Union handed over three documents on the 1st National Congress kept by the Communist International to the CCP Central Committee. The documents detailed the specific circumstances of the convening of the 1st National Congress, the program and resolutions adopted at the meeting, and clearly recorded that the opening date of the 1st National Congress was July 23. (Note: The document "The 1st National Congress of the Chinese Communist Party" states: "The congress was scheduled to be held on June 20, but the delegates from Beijing, Hankou, Guangzhou, Changsha, Jinan and Japan did not arrive in Shanghai until July 23, and the congress was opened.") In 1960, the Columbia University Libraries in the United States published a graduation thesis submitted by Chen Gongbo, a representative of the 1st National Congress in January 1924, confirming that the documents returned by the Communist Party of the Soviet Union were correct.

In January 1980, Shao Weizheng, a teacher at the Army Service Academy of the People's Liberation Army, published an article in Chinese Social Sciences, stating that the opening date of the 1st National Congress was July 23, 1921. However, the date of the anniversary was not subsequently corrected. The official statement was that people were already accustomed to July 1 as the anniversary of the birth of the party, so no changes were made. Zhang Baijia, deputy director of the Party History Research Office of the CCP Central Committee, said that the date itself was not important, what was important was that the party was founded.

== Commemoration ==
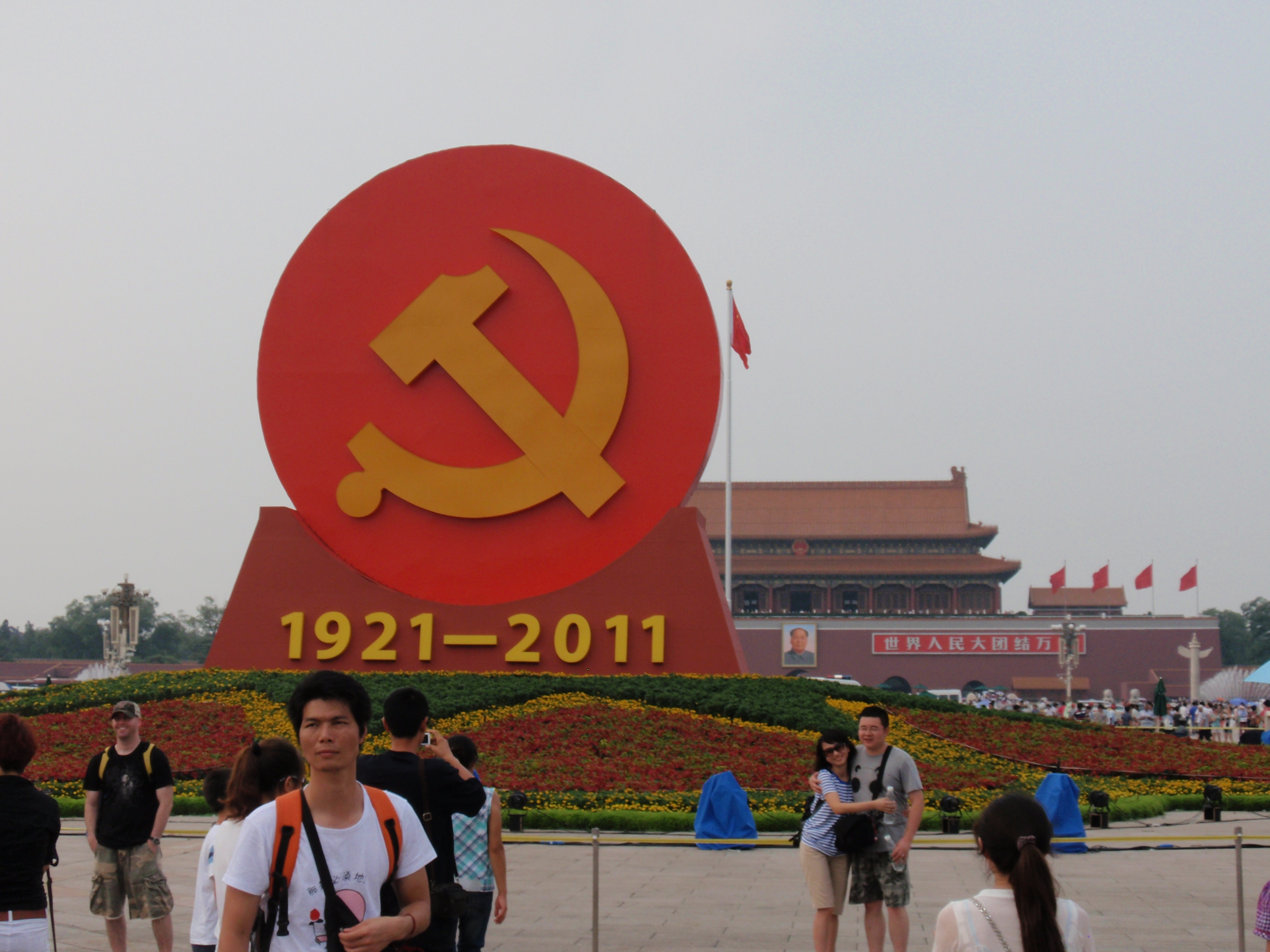
A temporary monument in Tiananmen Square marking the 90th anniversary of the Chinese Communist Party in 2011.

On July 1, 1981, the post office issued the J64 stamp "60th Anniversary of the Founding of the Chinese Communist Party", a complete set of 1 stamp.

On June 18, 1991, the People's Bank of China issued a set of three commemorative coins for the party's 70th anniversary.

In 2001, a series of activities to commemorate the 80th anniversary of the founding of the Party were held across China.

On June 16, 2011, the People's Bank of China issued ordinary commemorative coins to mark the party's 90th anniversary.

In 2021, various celebrations were held to mark the 100th anniversary of the Chinese Communist Party, including party history education, the awarding of the July 1st Medal, a conference, and theatrical performance of The Great Journey. Slogans included "Comprehensively grasp the great struggle, the great project, the great cause, and the great dream!" and "Struggle for a hundred years and embark on a new journey".
