= Hong Kong Special Administrative Region Establishment Day =

Holiday celebrating handover of Hong Kong

Establishment Day 香港特別行政區成立紀念日
- Observed by: Hong Kong
- Type: Government
- Significance: Marks the transfer of Hong Kong from the United Kingdom to China (PRC)
- Observances: Fireworks displays, political rallies
- Date: 1 July
- Next time: 1 July 2027
- Frequency: Annual
- Related to: Macau Special Administrative Region Establishment Day

Establishment Day, formally the Hong Kong Special Administrative Region Establishment Day (Chinese: 香港特別行政區成立紀念日), is celebrated annually on 1 July in Hong Kong since 1997. The holiday celebrates the transfer of sovereignty over Hong Kong from the United Kingdom to the People's Republic of China and the establishment of the Hong Kong Special Administrative Region. The similarly-named holiday in Macau occurs on 20 December, the day of its handover from Portugal.

The day is customarily marked by an officially organised extravagant fireworks display in the evening, and it is also the platform for political rallies demanding universal suffrage. In 2007, to commemorate the 10th anniversary celebration, the Hong Kong Government published a song, "Just Because You Are Here" (始終有你). It was sung by many Hong Kong singers and composed by Peter Kam (金培達), with lyrics by Keith Chan (陳少琪). In 2022, the 25th anniversary was commemorated with the swearing-in of new Chief Executive John Lee together with his cabinet.

== Current festivities ==
=== Protest marches ===
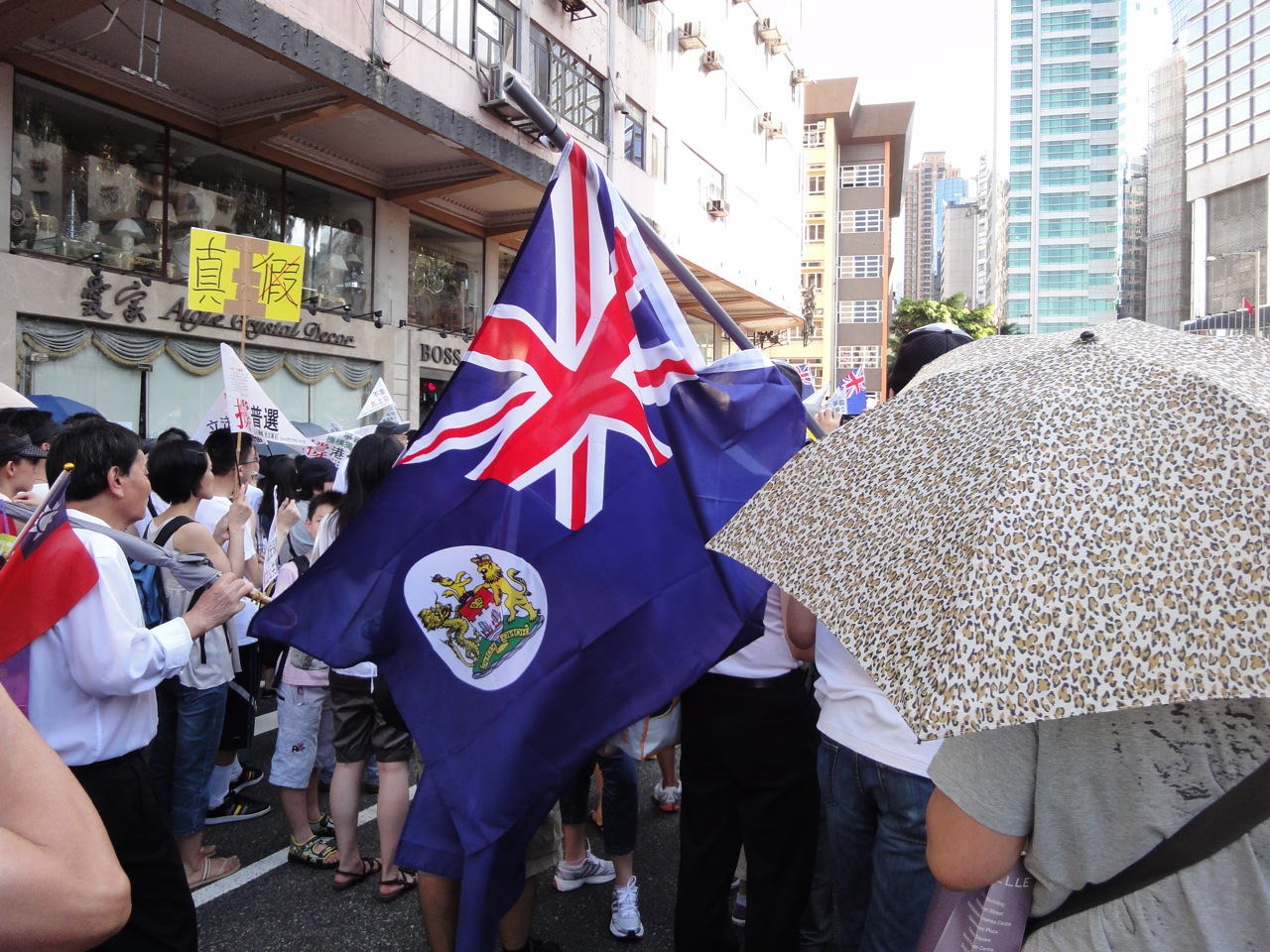
Hong Kong 1 July march in 2011

On 1 July of each year since the 1997 handover, a march is led by the Civil Human Rights Front. It has become the annual platform for demanding universal suffrage, calling for observance and preservation civil liberties such as free speech, venting dissatisfaction with the Hong Kong Government or the chief executive, rallying against actions of the Pro-Beijing camp.

However, it was only in 2003 when it drew large public attention by opposing the bill to enact the Hong Kong Basic Law Article 23. Most notably, in 2003, the HKSAR Government proposed implementing Article 23 of the Basic Law. However, fears arose that by legislating against acts such as treason, subversion, secession, and sedition, the legislation would infringe human rights by adopting the mainland's concept of "national security" into the HKSAR. Together with the general dissatisfaction with the Tung administration, about 500,000 people participated in this protest. Article 23 enactment was "temporarily suspended".

Since 2020, when the Hong Kong National Security Law was promulgated, there have been no further protest marches.

=== Fireworks display ===
Fireworks are not held on the evening of 1 July in Victoria Harbour.

=== Parades ===
Military parades have taken place on HKSAR Day in 2007, 2012, and 2017. In allowing those instances, they have also celebrated the anniversary of the People's Liberation Army. The 2017 parade held in honour of the 20th anniversary of the assession of Hong Kong was the largest parade in the HKSAR's existence, being held at Shek Kong Airfield in the presence of 20 formations, accounting for over 3,000 troops combined.

== History ==
=== Colonial history ===
Hong Kong's territory was acquired by United Kingdom from China through three separate treaties: the Treaty of Nanking in 1842, the Treaty of Beijing in 1860, and The Convention for the Extension of Hong Kong Territory in 1898, which gave the UK the control of Hong Kong Island, Kowloon (area south of Boundary Street), and the New Territories (area north of Boundary Street and south of the Shenzhen River, and outlying islands), respectively. Although Hong Kong Island and Kowloon had been ceded to the United Kingdom in perpetuity, the control on the New Territories was a 99-year lease.

=== Sino-British Joint Declaration ===
The Sino-British Joint Declaration was signed by the Prime Ministers of the People's Republic of China and the United Kingdom governments on 19 December 1984 in Beijing. The Declaration entered into force with the exchange of instruments of ratification on 27 May 1985. In the Joint Declaration, the PRC Government stated that it had decided to resume the exercise of sovereignty over Hong Kong (including Hong Kong Island, Kowloon, and the New Territories) with effect from 1 July 1997, and the UK Government declared that it would restore Hong Kong to the PRC with effect from 1 July 1997. In the document the PRC Government also declared its basic policies regarding Hong Kong.

In accordance with the "One country, two systems" principle agreed between the UK and the PRC, Hong Kong would become a special administrative region where the socialist system of PRC would not be practised, and Hong Kong's capitalist system and its way of life would remain unchanged for a period of 50 years from the date of handover.

=== Handover ceremony ===
The Hong Kong handover ceremony officially marked the transfer of sovereignty from the United Kingdom. It was an internationally televised event with the ceremony commencing on the night of 30 June 1997 and finishing on 1 July 1997 at the new wing of the Hong Kong Convention and Exhibition Centre (HKCEC) in Wan Chai.

=== Origins of the holiday, controversy ===
The day was made into a holiday by the Provisional Legislative Council on 10 May 1997 when it passed the Holidays (1997 and 1998) Bill, its first bill.

The Legislative Council under the colonial government adopted the Public Holiday (Special Holidays 1997) Bill on 17 June 1997 by 27 votes to nine, with the Liberal Party abstaining. The government tabled the bill for first reading in Legco in April 1997, two weeks after the provisional legislature had completed the first and second readings of its own holidays bill. The government was fiercely criticised by provisional legislature members who said it was a political tactic to embarrass the interim body.

The bill gave legal existence of 1 and 2 July as public holidays in 1997 in addition to the then current holidays under the Holidays Ordinance (Cap 149). The bill's purpose was to ensure both are paid holidays in the absence of a functioning government during the handover.
