= National Traffic Safety Day =

- Observed by: China
- Significance: Day to enhance traffic safety awareness
- Date: 2 December
- Next time: 2 December 2026
- Frequency: Annual
- First time: 2012

The National Traffic Safety Day is a festival in the People's Republic of China established by the Ministry of Public Security at the end of November 2011 to "enhance the traffic safety awareness, legal awareness and civilized awareness of mainland residents". 122 is also China's traffic accident emergency number.

== History ==
On November 21, 2012, the State Council of China agreed to establish December 2 of each year as "National Traffic Safety Day" starting from 2012. It specifically mentioned school bus safety, which is closely related to the 2011 Gansu school bus crash.

== Theme ==
- 2011: Civilized Traffic, Saying Goodbye to Bad Habits
- 2012: Obey traffic signals and travel safely and civilly
- 2013: Abandoning bad traffic habits and traveling safely and civilly
