= Journalists' Day =

Day to commend and thank journalists

The Journalists' Day is a day in Taiwan and the People's Republic of China to commend and thank journalists for their contributions to society and to recognize their courage in fighting for press freedom. In Taiwan, Journalists' Day is set on September 1 and is also known as "September 1st Journalists' Day". In the People's Republic of China, Journalists' Day is set on November 8 every year. It is a statutory holiday without a public holiday and is one of only three industry-specific holidays in mainland China (the other two being Teachers' Day and International Nurses Day).

== History ==
=== Republic of China ===
In 1933, Liu Yusheng, the chief editor of the Jiangsu Jiang Sheng Daily, was killed by the Jiangsu Provincial Government of the Nationalist government, which attracted the attention of the press in mainland China. On September 1, 1933, the National Government of China issued the Order on the Protection of News Workers and the Maintenance of Public Opinion Organs. In August 1934, the Hangzhou Journalists Association suggested to the national press that September 1 be designated as "Journalists' Day". Subsequently, September 1 was established by the Nationalist government of the Republic of China as Journalists ' Day, a date that continues to this day.

=== People's Republic of China ===
The National Holidays and Commemorative Days Regulations promulgated in 1949 stipulated "Journalists' Day", but did not specify a date. On September 18, 1999, Premier Zhu Rongji signed the first revision of the "Decision of the State Council on Amending the National Holidays and Commemorative Days Regulations", stipulating that Journalists' Day is a working holiday without a holiday, and is one of only three industry-specific holidays in mainland China (the other two are Teachers' Day and International Nurses Day). In 2000, the State Council officially approved the All-China Journalists Association's "Request for Instructions on Determining the Specific Date of 'Journalists' Day'", agreeing to designate November 8, the founding day of the China Journalists Association, as Journalists' Day.
