= Xu Xiake's Travels =

17th-century Chinese travelogue book

Xu Xiake's Travels (Chinese: 徐霞客遊記) is a Chinese travelogue book, written in the 17th century. It consists mainly of essays describing the travels of the Ming dynasty geographer Xu Xiake. Over 34 years, Xu produced more than 600,000 words, including works such as "Guizhou tour diary" and "Yunnan tour diary". This book offers detailed descriptions of geography, hydrology, geology, plants and other phenomena. It is also respected and valued for its literary qualities and for its historicity.

== Writing process ==
Xu Xiake traveled 22 years after he married in 1607 until his death in 1640. He reached all 16 provinces of China. He traveled to Jinling (Nanjing) in 1611, visited Mount Huangshan, Wuyishan, Baiyue Nine-Bend stream, and West Lake in 1616. He went to Songshan, Huashan, Tai Shan, and Wudang Mountains. He traveled to Luoyang during 1625–1627 and Fujian in 1628. During 1636–1640, he was away from his home.

== Description ==
Xu Xiake's Travels has 22 sections. Xu Xiake's travels at times put him in danger. His persistence led others to invent the term "spirit of Xu Xiake".

Xu Xiake's Travels corrected many mistakes about Chinese roads, described many plants and how the wind speed and air temperature affect plants.
