= National Constitution Day =

- Observed by: China
- Significance: Day to commemorate the adoption of the 1984 Constitution
- Date: 4 December
- Next time: 4 December 2026
- Frequency: Annual
- First time: 2014

The National Constitution Day is a constitutional publicity and education day in China to commemorate the adoption of the constitution. It was established in 2014 by the National People's Congress to "enhance the constitutional awareness of the whole society, promote the spirit of the Constitution, strengthen the implementation of the Constitution, and comprehensively advance the rule of law" 60 years after the implementation of the Constitution in 1984.

December 4, 2014 was the first National Constitution Day of China. On October 23, 2014, the Fourth Plenary Session of the 18th Central Committee of the Chinese Communist Party adopted the "Decision of the CCP Central Committee on Several Major Issues Concerning Comprehensively Advancing the Rule of Law", proposing to designate December 4 of each year as National Constitution Day. On November 1, 2014, the Standing Committee of the National People's Congress voted to adopt the "Decision on Establishing National Constitution Day", which was established in the form of legislation.

== History ==
On December 4, 1982, the newly drafted fourth Constitution of China was promulgated and implemented by the National People's Congress. On April 26, 2001, the Central Committee of the Chinese Communist Party and the State Council forwarded the "Fourth Five-Year Plan of the Publicity Department and the Ministry of Justice on Carrying Out Legal Publicity and Education Among Citizens," which stipulated that "December 4, the date of implementation of the current Constitution of China, shall be designated as the National Legal Publicity Day once a year." Since 2001, December 4 has been the National Legal Publicity Day.

In 2001, Han Dayuan, Dean of the School of Law of Renmin University of China and President of the China Constitutional Law Research Association, suggested that December 4 be designated as National Constitution Day. In 2012, on the 30th anniversary of the promulgation and implementation of the 1982 Constitution, Han Dayuan wrote an article calling for the establishment of National Constitution Day.

The Decision of the CCP Central Committee on Several Major Issues Concerning Comprehensively Advancing the Rule of Law, adopted at the fourth plenary session of the 18th Central Committee on October 23, 2014, proposed that "December 4th of each year be designated as National Constitution Day," and at the same time decided to establish a constitutional oath system. On November 1, 2014, the 11th meeting of the Standing Committee of the 12th National People's Congress adopted the "Decision of the Standing Committee of the National People's Congress on Establishing a National Constitution Day", which stipulates that "December 4 shall be designated as National Constitution Day. The state shall carry out constitutional publicity and education activities in various forms."
