= Public holidays in Macau =

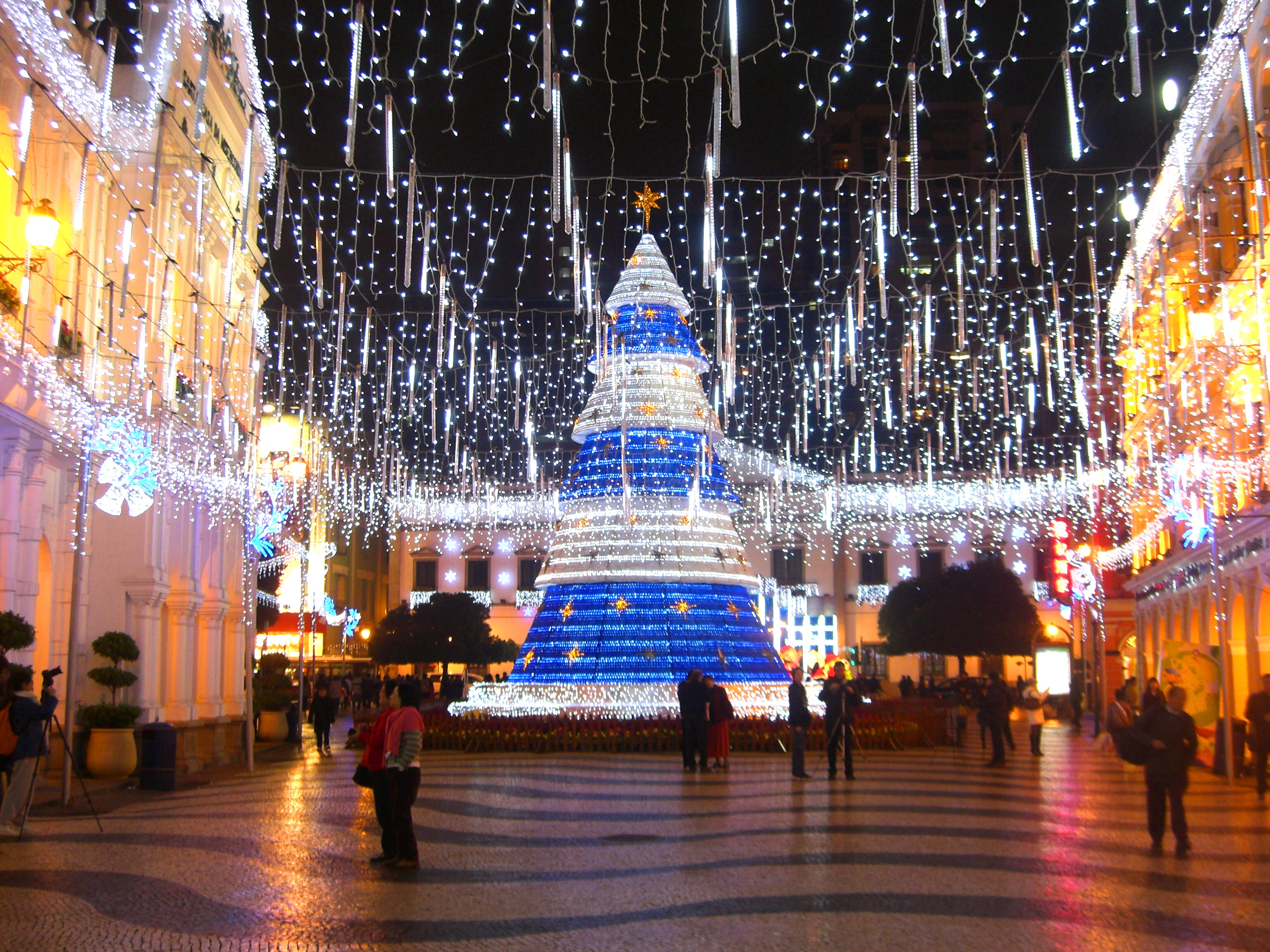
Christmas decorations on the Senado Square. Christmas is one of the first statutory public holidays in Macau.

Public holidays in Macau are dates assigned by the Government of Macau allowing the public administration staff to rest instead of working. The current rest days of the Macau government are Saturdays and Sundays; while public holidays basically include traditional Chinese holidays, western and Catholic festivals as well as Macanese local festivals.

== List ==
Date	English name	Chinese name	Portuguese name
January 1	New Year's Day	元旦	Fraternidade Universal
Last day of last year (Lunar)	Chinese New Year's Eve	除夕	Véspera do Novo Ano Lunar
1st day of 1st month (Lunar)	Chinese New Year's Day	農曆正月初一	1.º dia do 1.º mês do Novo Ano Lunar
2nd day of 1st month (Lunar)	Second day of Chinese New Year's Day	農曆正月初二	2.º dia do 1.º mês do Novo Ano Lunar
3rd day of 1st month (Lunar)	Third day of Chinese New Year's Day	農曆正月初三	3.º dia do 1.º mês do Novo Ano Lunar
April 5 (April 4 in leap years)	Ching Ming Festival	清明節	Cheng Ming (Dia de Finados)
2 days before Easter (see Computus)	Good Friday	耶穌受難日	Morte de Cristo
Day before Easter	Holy Saturday	復活節前日	Sábado de Aleluia
May 1	Labour Day	勞動節	Dia do Trabalhador
8th day of 4th month (Lunar)	Buddha's Birthday	佛誕節	Dia do Buda
5th day of 5th month (Lunar)	Tuen Ng Festival (Dragon Boat Festival)	端午節	Tung Ng (Barco Dragão)
16th day of 8th month (Lunar)	Day following the Mid-Autumn Festival	中秋節翌日	Dia seguinte ao Chong Chao (Bolo Lunar)
October 1	National Day	中華人民共和國國慶	Implantação da República Popular da China
October 2	Day following the National Day of the People's Republic of China	中華人民共和國國慶翌日	Dia seguinte à Implantação da República Popular da China
9th day of 9th moon (Lunar)	Chung Yeung Festival	重陽節	Chong Yeong (Culto dos Antepassados)
November 2	All Souls Day	追思節	Dia de Finados
December 8	Feast of the Immaculate Conception	聖母無原罪瞻禮	Imaculada Conceição
December 20	Macau Special Administrative Region Establishment Day	澳門特別行政區成立紀念日	Dia Commemorativo do Estabelecimento da Região Administrativa Especial de Macau
December 21 or 22	Winter solstice	冬至	Solstício de Inverno
December 24	Christmas Eve	聖誕節前日	Véspera de Natal
December 25	Christmas Day	聖誕節	Natal
December 31	New Year's Eve	元旦前夕	Véspera de Ano-Novo

== See also ==
- List of observances set by the Chinese calendar
- Public holidays in Hong Kong
