= Chinese New Year's Eve =

Last day of the lunisolar Chinese calendar year

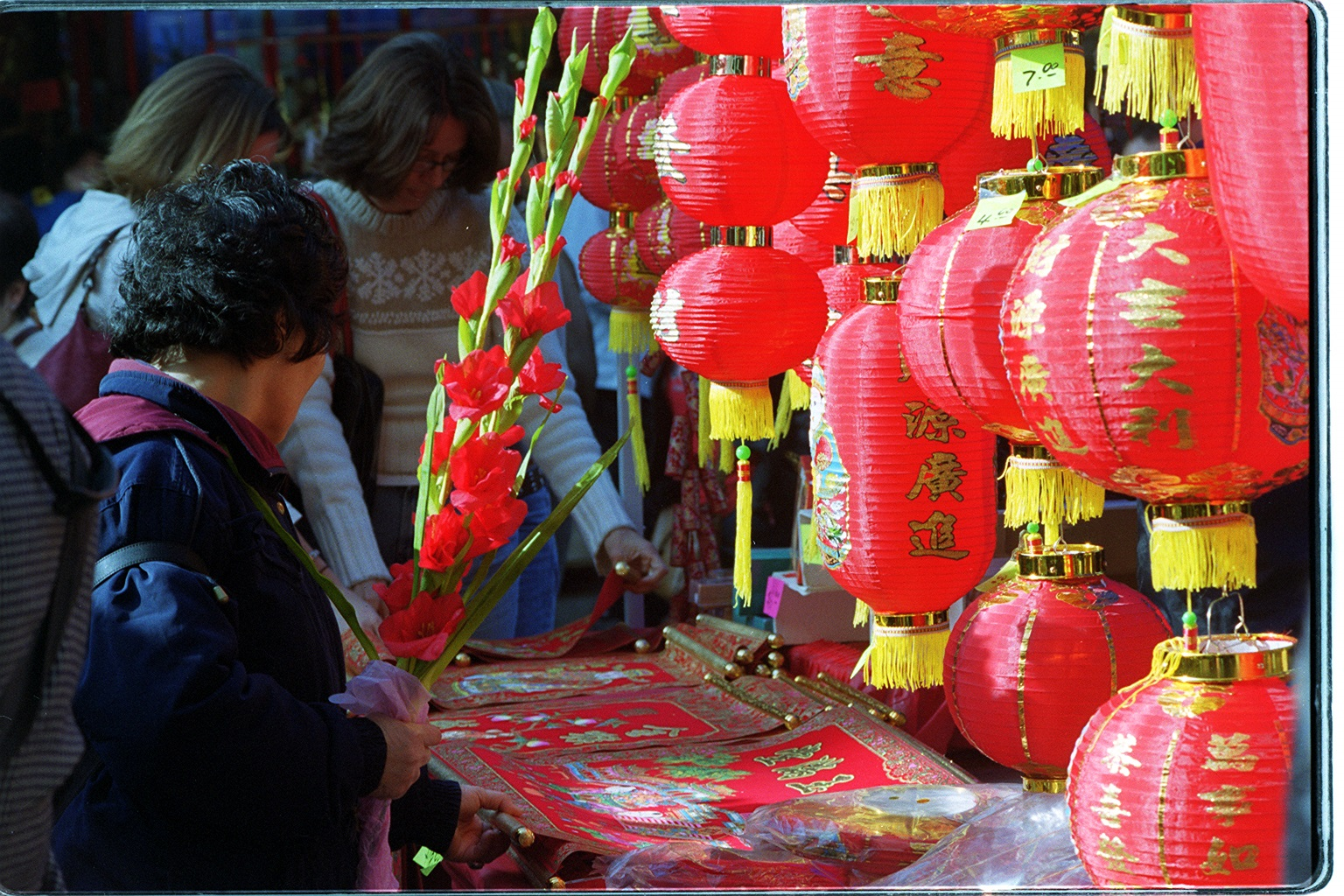
- Official name: 除夕 (chúxī) in China
- Also called: Spring Festival Eve
- Observed by: China, Korea, Malaysia, Singapore, Indonesia, Taiwan, Vietnam, Thailand, Philippines
- Type: Cultural, religious
- Significance: Celebrates the end of the year
- Date: Last day of the 12th month of the Chinese calendar
- 2025 date: 28 January
- 2026 date: 16 February
- 2027 date: 5 February
- 2028 date: 25 January
- Frequency: Annual
- Related to: Chinese New Year

Chinese New Year's Eve (Chinese: 除夕, romanized: chúxī) is the day before the Chinese New Year. The holiday falls between January 21 and February 20 on the Gregorian calendar. Evolving over a long period of time, it is considered a reunion day for every ethnic Chinese family. The origin of Chinese New Year's Eve can be traced back to 3,500 years ago.

== History ==
Chinese New Year's Eve originated in the Shang dynasty (1600 – 1046 BC) when the Chinese held sacrificial ceremonies in honor of their gods and ancestors at the end of each year. In the Zhou dynasty (1046 – 256 BC), the phrase "Nian (Year)" appeared and certain cultural practices became popular among Chinese such as sending door gods and burning bamboo.

The first dated Chinese New Year's Eve was recorded during the Warring States period (475 – 221 BC). In Lüshi Chunqiu, an exorcistic ritual called "Big Nuo" (大傩) was recorded being carried out on the ending day of a year to expel illness in Qin (state). It was derived from an earlier ritual, Nuo (傩), which is the origin of Chinese New Year's Eve. Later, when Qin unified China and founded the Qin dynasty, the ritual was continued. During this time, the practice of thoroughly cleaning up houses in the preceding days before the Chinese New Year began to develop.

During the Jin dynasty (266 – 420 AD), people started to do the "Shousui (守岁)" tradition on New Year's Eve. It was recorded by Western Jin's general Zhou Chu's article Fengtu Ji (风土记): "At the ending of a year, people gift and wish each other, calling it Kuisui (馈岁); people invite others with drinks and food, calling it Biesui (别岁); on the new year's eve, people stayed up all night until sunrise, calling it Shousui (守岁)". The article used the word "除夕 (Chuxi)" to indicate New Year's Eve, and the name is still used till this day.

== Dates of Chinese New Year's Eve ==
There is no fixed date on the Gregorian calendar for Chinese New Year's Eve, as the holiday falls on the lunar calendar.

Dates of Chinese New Year's Eve (2011 - 2031)
Years	Date	Day
2011	February 2	Wednesday
2012	January 22	Sunday
2013	February 9	Saturday
2014	January 30	Thursday
2015	February 18	Wednesday
2016	February 7	Sunday
2017	January 27	Friday
2018	February 15	Thursday
2019	February 4	Monday
2020	January 24	Friday
2021	February 11	Thursday
2022	January 31	Monday
2023	January 21	Saturday
2024	February 9	Friday
2025	January 28	Tuesday
2026	February 16	Monday
2027	February 5	Friday
2028	January 25	Tuesday
2029	February 12	Monday
2030	February 2	Saturday
2031	January 22	Wednesday

== Traditions ==
While many customs exist throughout China, varying by region, most practices still remain in use today.

=== Gathering ===
Especially in southern China, people celebrate Chinese New Year's Eve with a big family meal with traditional dishes. Everyone, including children, can drink alcohol. Families make sacrifices to their ancestors: they set out seats for the ancestors, lay out food, and pour them drinks, and burn joss sticks and candles. Family members kowtow while the ancestors eat. After dinner, the family members sit together, perhaps talking or playing cards.

=== Staying up all night ===
On Chinese New Year's Eve, people stay up late, until midnight or often until dawn. This tradition is called shousui (simplified Chinese: 守岁; traditional Chinese: 守歲; pinyin: shǒusuì; lit. 'guarding the year').

=== TV gala ===
The Spring Festival Gala is a TV show which broadcasts live on China's Central Television during Chinese New Year's Eve.The program includes singing, dancing, sketch comedy and cross-talk. It typically takes 6 months to do the preparation. With more and more Chinese families being able to afford television during the 1980s, the spring festival gala has been institutionalized as a crucial practice of Chinese New Year's Eve, as every family member sits in front of the TV, watching the spring festival gala together. The spring festival gala broadcasts until midnight, when everyone in front of the television will say "Happy New Year" at midnight with the hosts.

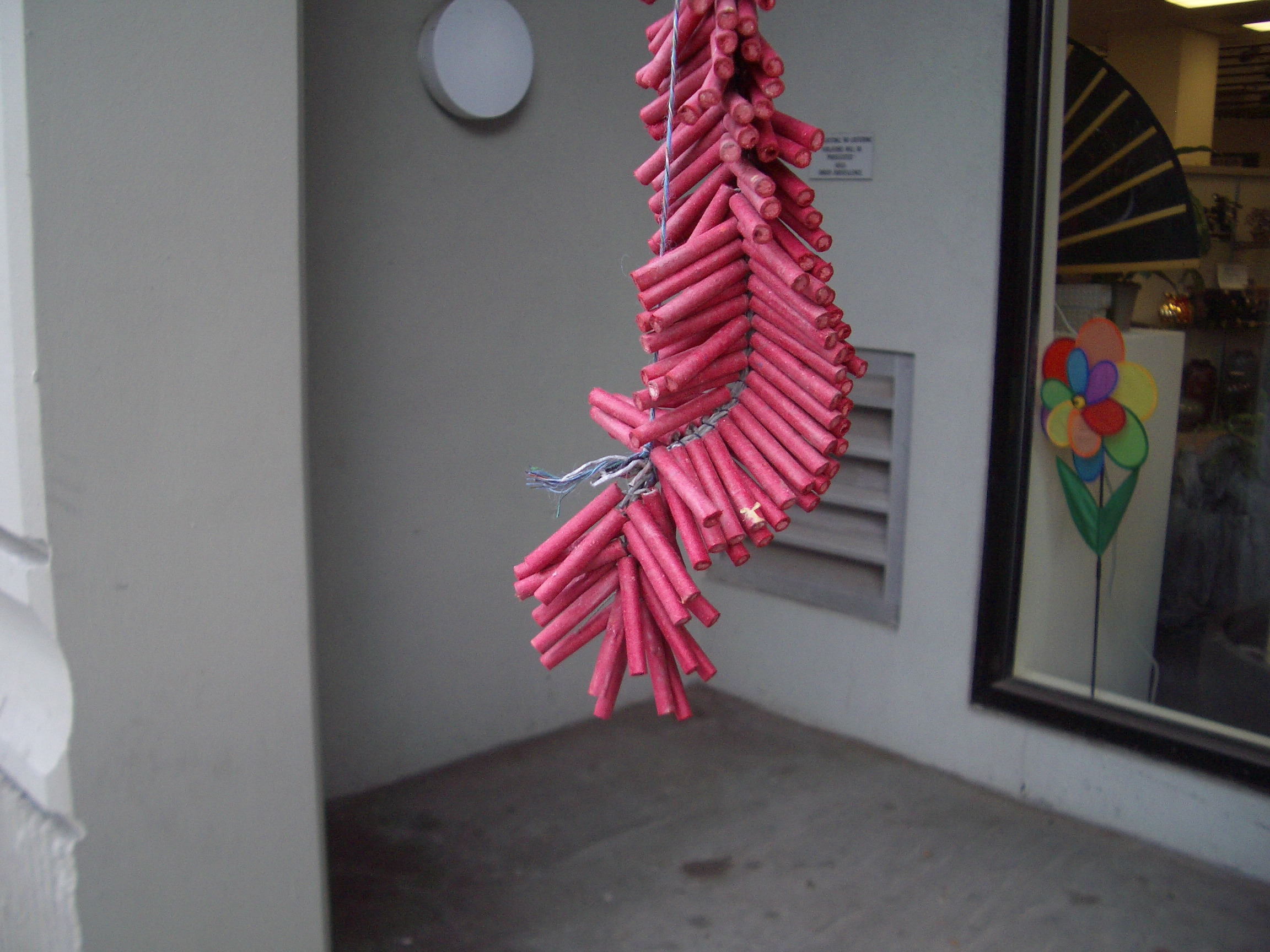
Firecrackers String

=== Burning of bamboo and use of firecrackers ===
According to ancient Chinese mythology, a devil was believed to be living in the western mountains, who possessed the ability to inflict illness upon those who encountered it. Throughout most of Chinese history, Chinese households burned bamboo to scare said devil out of their house on Chinese New Year's Eve. In contemporary times, firecrackers have replaced bamboo as the holiday's primary method of celebration.

=== Kitchen God ===
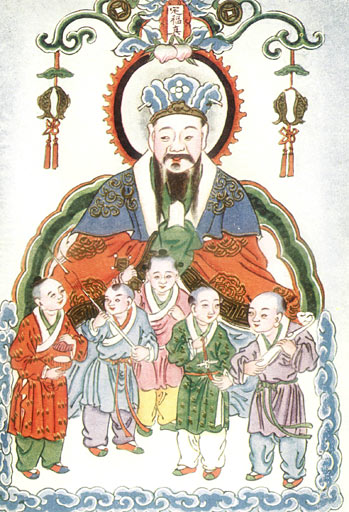
Kitchen God

The Chinese Kitchen God is regarded as the ambassador of the Jade Emperor to each Chinese family. It is said that at the midnight of Chinese New Year's Eve, the kitchen god from each family should go to heaven to report the family's deeds during the year. On Chinese New Year, the kitchen god returns to the earth and each family welcomes him by pasting a new picture of him in the kitchen.

=== Inviting a door god ===
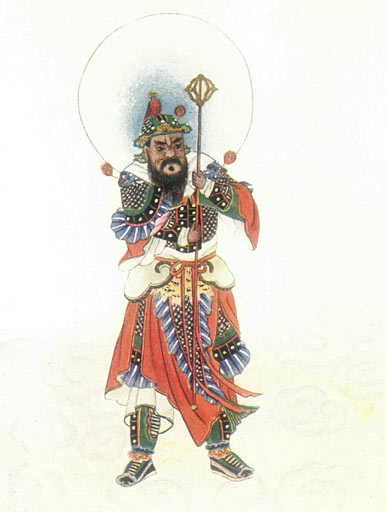
Door God

On Chinese New Year's Eve, each family would invite the door god by pasting its picture on the front door as a talisman to forbid any devil to enter the family. The most popular door gods are Zhong Kui, Qin Shubao and Yuchi Gong in different areas of China.

=== Peach wood ===
On Chinese New Year's Eve, Chinese will make bow of peach wood to exorcise the devil that caused plagues, which dates back to the Qin dynasty. The ghost would do no harm to man, but the ancients were afraid of them, so they asked for help to drive the ghost away. The entrance-guarding god was closely related to festivals and peach wood was regarded as a supernatural force with which ghosts could be driven away.

=== Traditional foods for Chinese New Year's Eve ===
Family reunion dinner is crucial to Chinese. Chinese New Year's Eve feast allows every family members to sit together. It takes days to do the preparation. Every dish on Chinese New Year's Eve have different meanings. Some of the most popular dishes are:

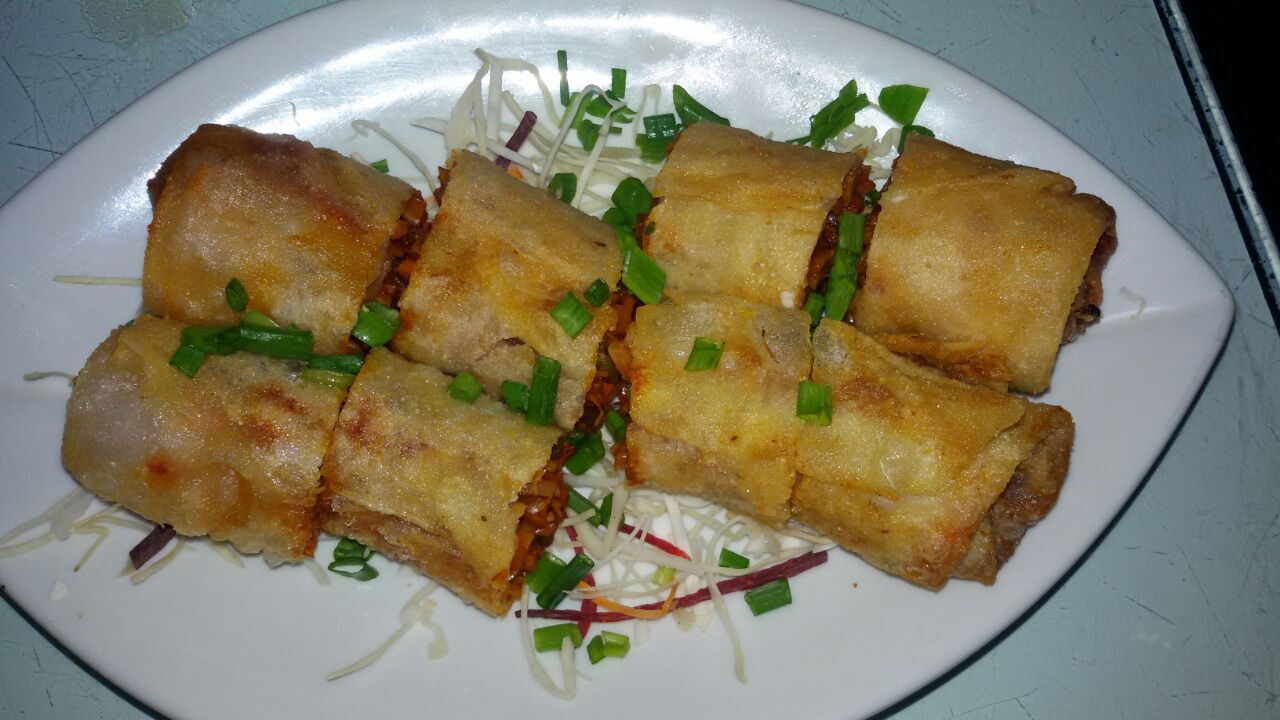
Chinese Vegetable Spring Roll

==== Spring rolls ====
Spring rolls are a traditional dish in parts of China. People make the thin dough wrappers in the cylindrical-shaped rolls and fill them with vegetables, meat, or something sweet, then fried the spring rolls to give them a golden-yellow color.

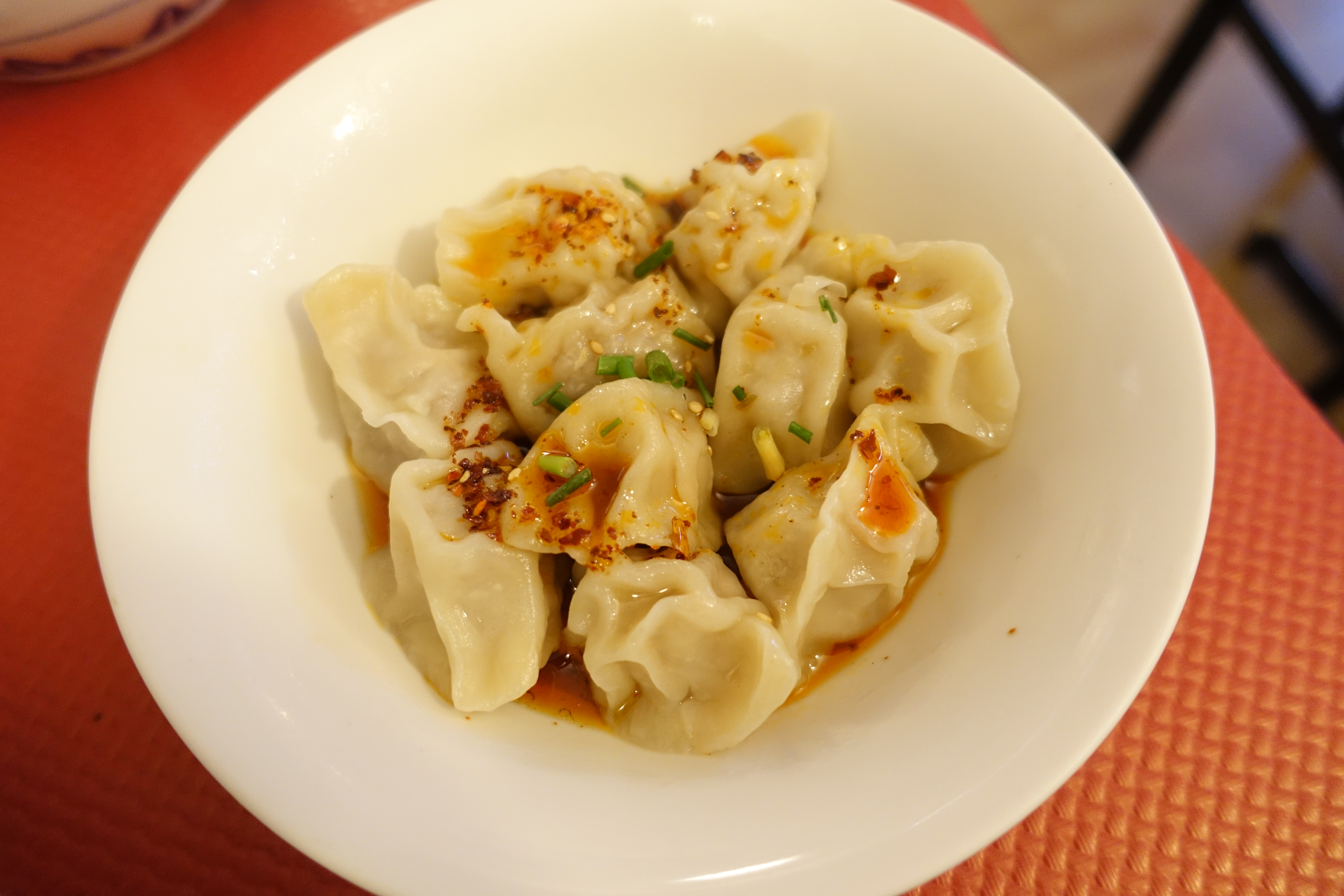
Dumplings

==== Dumplings ====
The dumpling is a traditional food to eat in north China on Chinese New Year's Eve while in southern China very few people serve dumplings as Chinese New Year's Eve dinner. Minced meat (pork, shrimp, chicken, beef.etc.) and vegetables are wrapped in the elastic dough skin. Boiling, steaming, frying are the most common ways to cook dumplings in China.

==== Glutinous rice cake ====
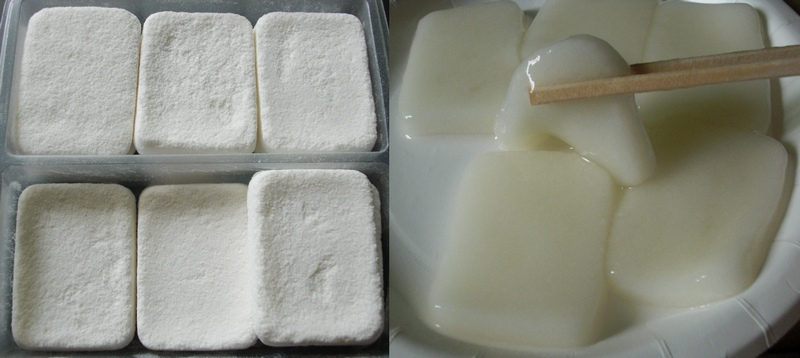
Glutinous Rice Cake

Glutinous Rice Cake is called "niangao" in Mandarin. The sound of Nian Gao has a good meaning: getting higher year by year. Glutinous Rice Cake is made of sticky rice, sugar, chestnuts, lotus leaves. It is a common dish which appeared in the southern Chinese families' Chinese New Year Eve reunion dinner.

==== Good fortune fruit ====
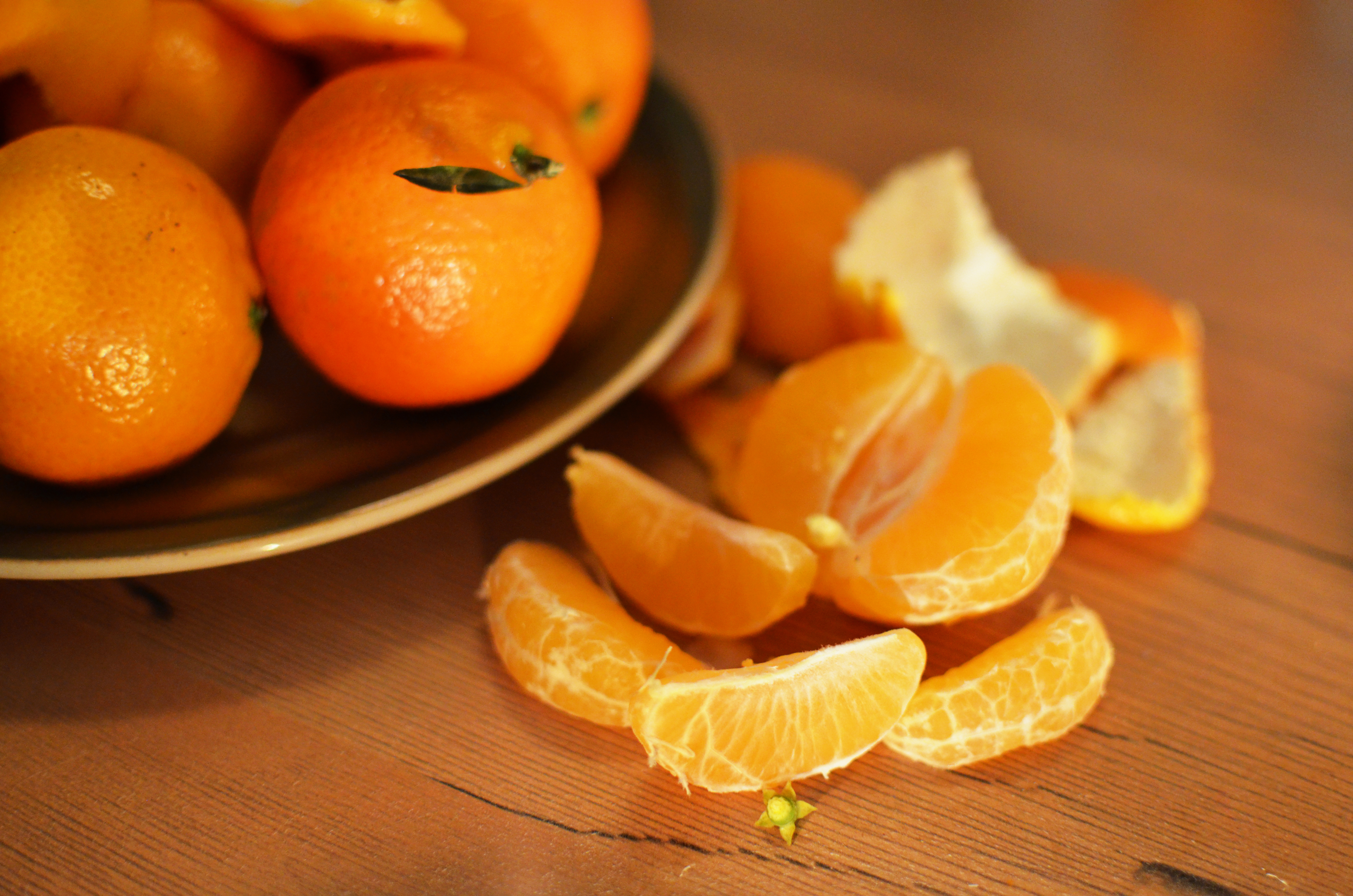
Tangerines

Tangerines, oranges and pomelos are certain fruits that been eaten on Chinese New Year's Eve. Chinese believe that eating these fruits on Chinese New Year's Eve can bring fortune as these fruits have round shape, golden colour, lucky sounds when spoken which symbolise fullness and wealth.

==== Longevity noodles ====
Longevity noodles represents Chinese' wish for longevity. The length and preparation of longevity noodles are the symbolic of eater's life. Longevity noodles are longer than normal noodles, usually fried or boiled and served in the bowl.

=== Money gifts and money trees ===
Chinese will give children money gifts as Chinese new year gift on Chinese New Year's Eve. They usually put money in red pockets and hide under their children's pillows. In ancient times, Chinese money was the round copper coin with a square hole in the middle. adults will thread the coins with colourful thread to make a shape of dragon and then they will put the money beside their children's beds while their children are asleep, which is very similar to Christmas gifts in the West.

A money tree is a legendary tree which will shed coins when shaken. On Chinese New Year's Eve, Chinese will cut some pine branches and put the branches in vase. Then they will tie copper coins, shoe-shaped gold or silver and pomegranate flowers to the tree, which is very similar to the Christmas tree in western countries.

== Similar traditions in other part of Asia ==
=== Philippines ===
Chinese New Year's Eve in Philippines is called Bisperas ng Bagong Taon in Tagalog. On Chinese New Year's Eve, all doors including cupboards, drawers, cabinets, windows must be left wide open to allow good luck to enter. Chinese Filipinos do not eat fish and chicken on Chinese New Year's Eve as these animals scrounge for food and Chinese Filipinos do not want to scrounge for food in the upcoming year. They prepare twelve round fruits (oranges, grapes, clementines, cantaloupe etc.) on Chinese New Year's Eve and each fruit represents a month.

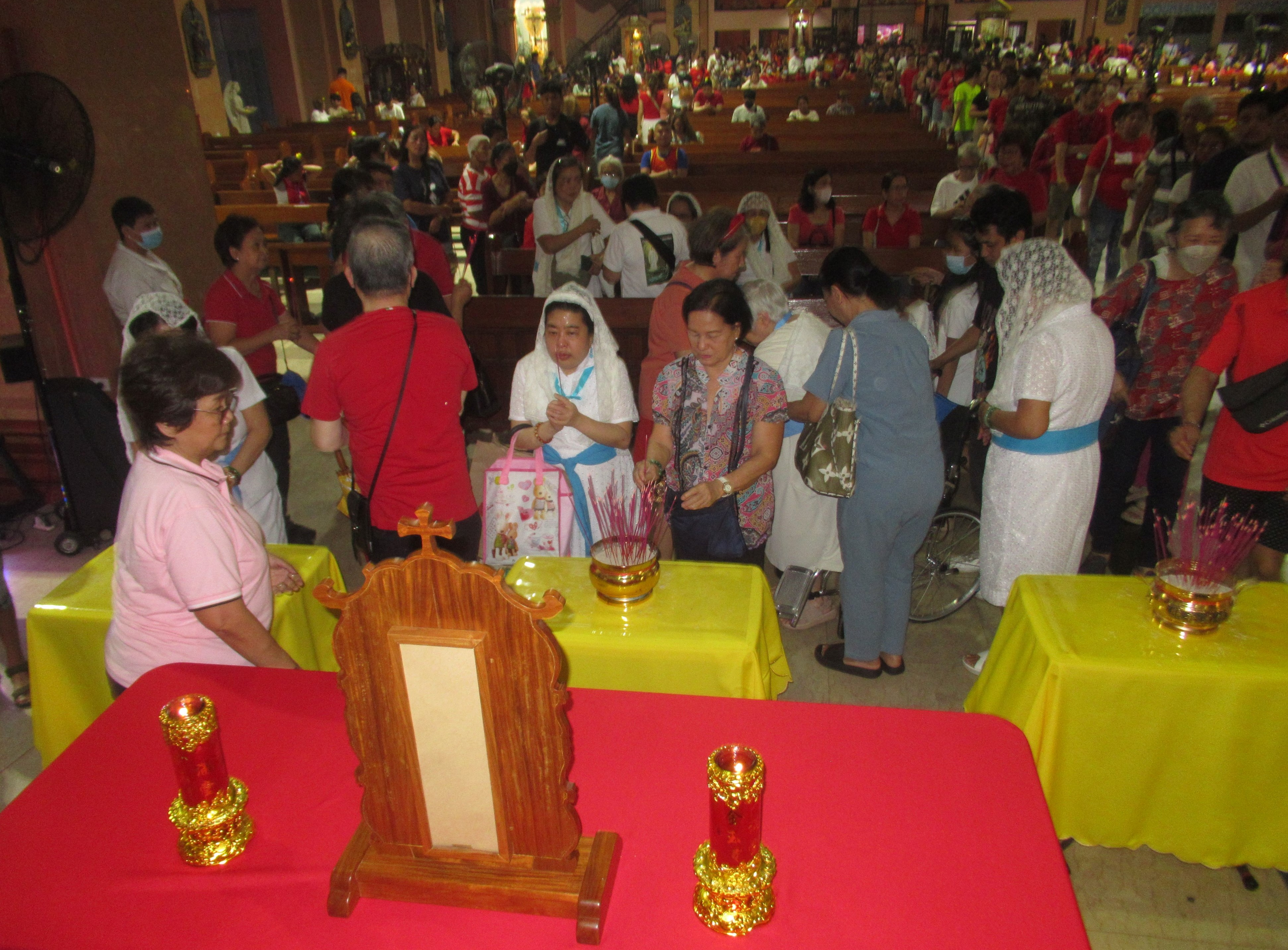
First incense offering" at Binondo Church

In 2012, Chinese New Year was included as a public regular non-working holiday in the Philippines. In 2024, Manila celebrates the Spring Festival of the Wooden Dragon, including the 430th anniversary of Manila Chinatown featuring the "Manila Chinatown Solidarity Float Parade" along Manila Central Post Office in Lawton, Ermita and Jones Bridge led by Ambassador Huang Xilian with Mr. & Ms. Chinatown Philippines 2023 winners. It was preceded by Chinese New Year's Eve, with the "First incense offering" at Binondo Church, a Taoism prayer ritual with Joss sticks, including Chinese ancestor worship at Martyr Saints of China altars in Binondo Chinese Parish Church. A midnight 2-minute pyro-musical fireworks was witnessed by 1.5 million at the Chinese-Filipino Friendship Bridge.
