= Children's Day (Japan) =

Public holiday in Japan

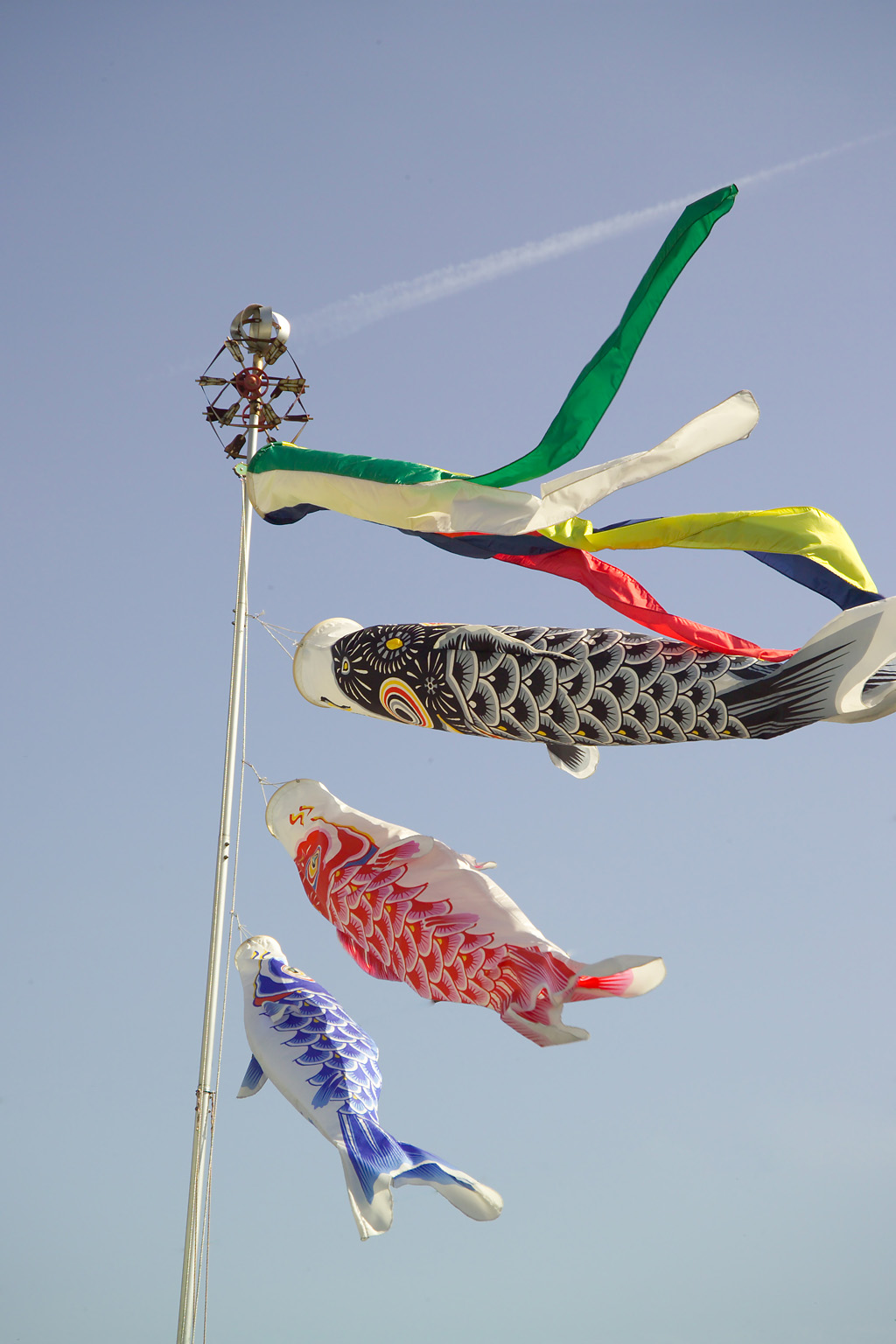
- Koinobori: The black carp (Magoi) at the top represents the father, the red carp (Higoi) represents the mother, and the last carp represents the child (traditionally son), with an additional carp added for each subsequent child with color and position denoting their relative age.
- Official name: 子供の日 (Kodomo no hi)
- Observed by: Japan
- Type: Public
- Significance: Celebrates children's personalities and their happiness
- Celebrations: A public holiday in Japan
- Observances: It was designated a national holiday by the Japanese government in 1948, but has been a day of celebration in Japan since ancient times
- Date: May 5
- Next time: 5 May 2027
- Frequency: Annual
- Related to: Golden Week (Japan), Tango no Sekku, Duanwu Festival, Dano Festival, Tết Đoan Ngọ

Children's Day (こどもの日, Kodomo no hi) is a public holiday in Japan which takes place annually on May 5 and is the final celebration in Golden Week. It is a day set aside to respect children's personalities and to celebrate their happiness. It was designated a national holiday by the Japanese government in 1948, but has been a day of celebration in Japan since ancient times.

Children's Day has officially been a day to wish for the happiness of all children since 1948, but its origin, Tango no Sekku, was a day for boys from the Kamakura period in the 12th century to the mid-20th century, and the customs of Children's Day still retain vestiges from that time.

== History ==
The day was originally called Tango no sekku (端午の節句) – one of the five annual ceremonies held at the imperial court – and was celebrated on the fifth day of the fifth moon in the Lunisolar calendar.

Tango no Sekku was originally a day for women to purify the house by thatching the roof with irises, which were believed to be effective in repelling evil spirits, and for women to rest their bodies, but it was changed to a day for boys in the Kamakura period (1185–1333) when the samurai class took control of the government. The reason for this was that the iris was a plant that represented the samurai because its leaves were shaped like the blade of a Japanese sword, and the word shōbu (尚武), which means "to value military affairs", had the same pronunciation as iris (菖蒲) and was therefore considered an auspicious plant for the samurai. Since this period, yabusame (Japanese horseback archery) was held on May 5 as a way to ward off evil spirits.

The custom of displaying mini Japanese armor and kabuto (helmets) on Children's Day, called Gogatsu Ningyo (May doll), has its origins in the Kamakura to Muromachi periods (1333–1573). Samurai used to take their armor, kabuto, and Japanese swords out of their storage boxes in May before the rainy season to take care of them. Since this was the time of the Tango no Sekku, they began to display armor, kabuto, and Japanese swords in the hope of protecting their children.

During the Edo period (1603–1867), Tango no Sekku celebrations became extravagant, and samurai households began to display samurai dolls (Musha Ningyo, 武者人形) in addition to real armor, kabuto, and Japanese swords. Ordinary households began to display paper kabuto. The custom of bathing in the bathtub with irises on May 5 began in this period.

The custom of decorating koinobori (carp streamers) on Children's Day originated in the Edo period (1603–1867). During the Edo period, samurai households began to decorate their yards with nobori or fukinuke (吹貫) flags, which were colored with mon (family crests) to represent military units, during Tango no Sekku. The nobori and fukinuke were then merged, and the first koinobori appeared in Edo (now Tokyo). The colorful koinobori as we know them today became popular from the Meiji era (1868–1912).

After Japan switched to the Gregorian calendar, the date was moved to May 5. Until 1948, Children's Day was known as Boys' Day (also known as Feast of Banners), celebrating boys and recognizing fathers, as the counterpart to Hinamatsuri, or "Girl's Day" on March 3. In 1948, the name was changed to Children's Day to include both male and female children, as well as recognizing mothers along with fathers and family qualities of unity.

In the Showa era (1926–1989), the popularity shifted from samurai dolls to miniature armor, and since the 21st century, miniature kabuto have become popular, probably due to the size of Japanese homes.

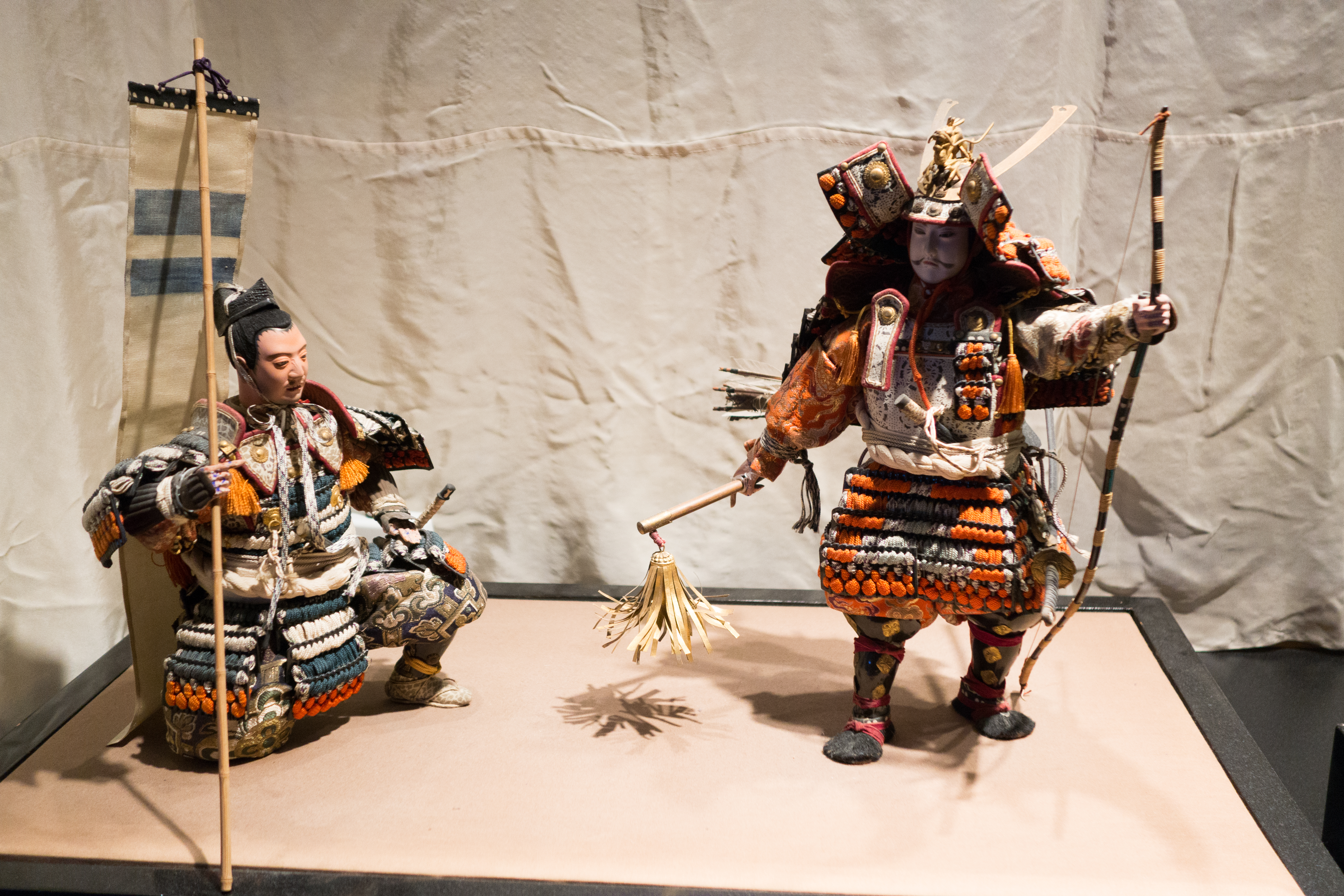
Two samurai dolls (Musha Ningyo, 武者人形)

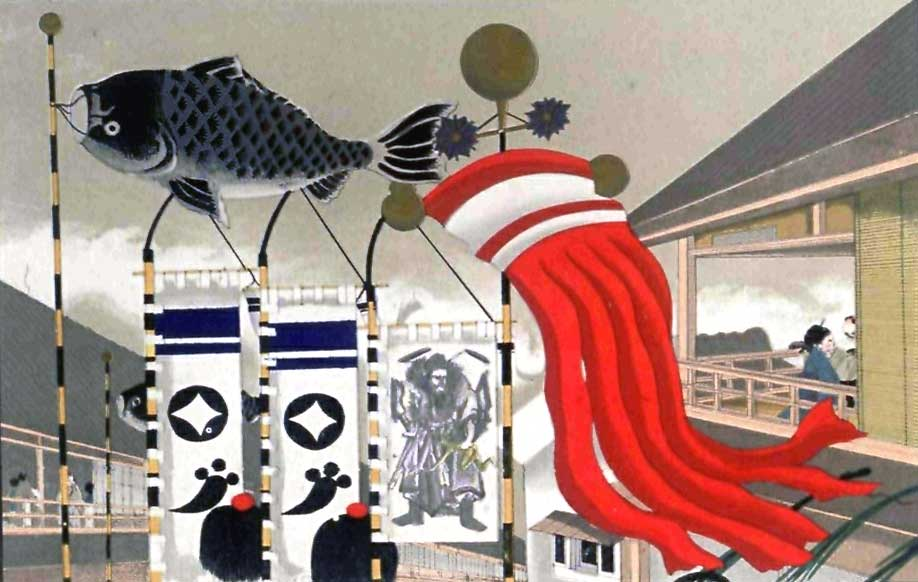
Koinobori, nobori and fukinuke (吹貫). "Japanese Festival in Honor of the Birth of Children" from Sketches of Japanese Manners and Customs, by J.M.W. Silver, illustrated by native drawings, published in London in 1867

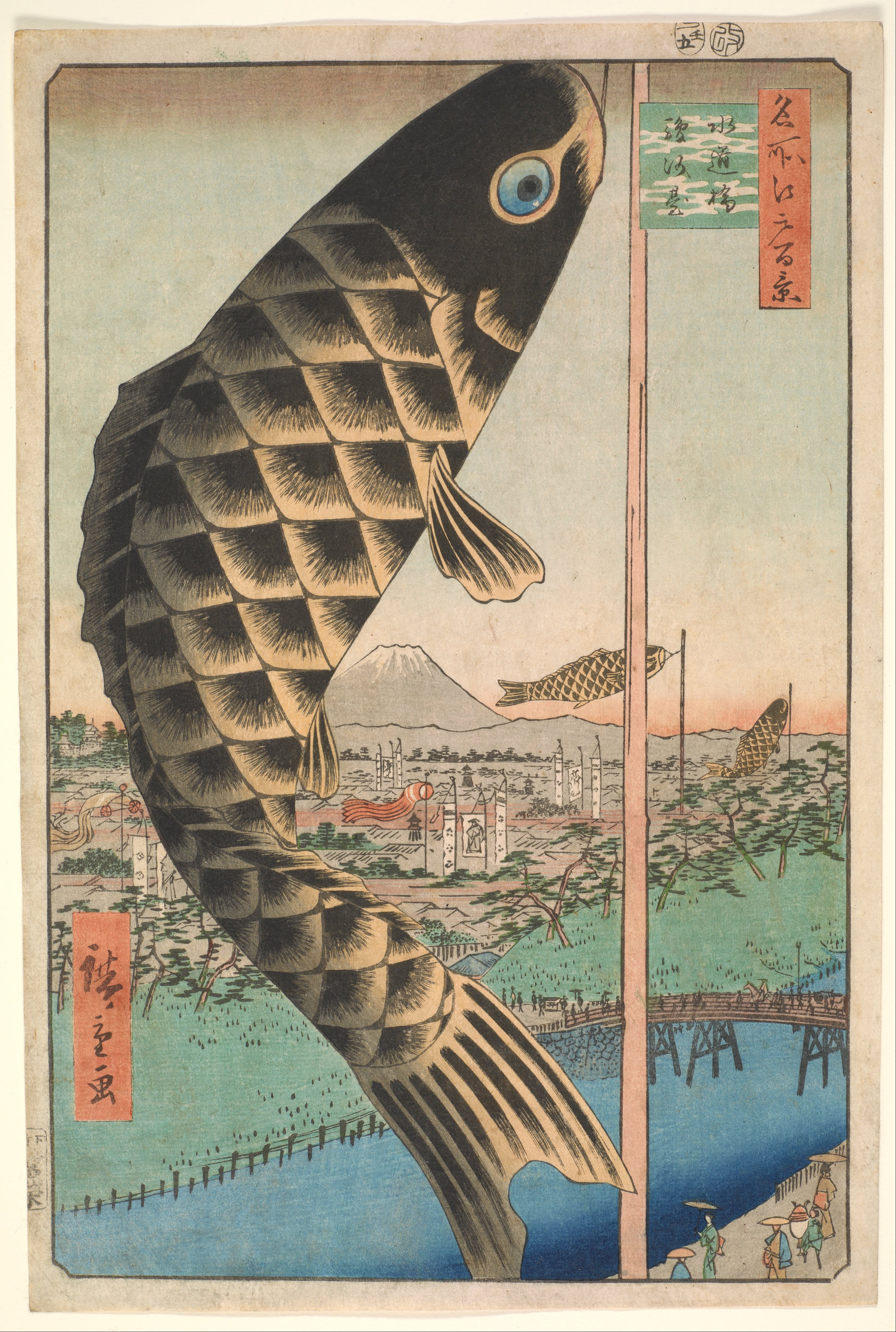
Ukiyo-e by Utagawa Hiroshige depicting koinobori. Edo period

== Celebration ==
On this day, families raise the koinobori, carp-shaped windsock (because of the Chinese legend that a carp that swims upstream becomes a dragon and flies to Heaven, and the resemblance of the waving windsock to swimming fish), with a black carp for the father, a red or pink for the mother, and one carp (usually blue, and sometimes green and orange too) for each child. Traditionally, when celebrated as Boys' Day, the red koinobori was for the eldest son with blue and additional colors for younger brothers.

In modern times, Japanese families usually display miniature Japanese armor and kabuto called Gogatsu Ningyo (May doll) on Children's Day. These dolls are usually made in the style of ō-yoroi or dō-maru popular in the Heian (794–1185) and Kamakura periods (1185–1333), which is more showy in appearance than the tōsei gusoku style armor of the Sengoku period. There are also kabuto made to fit the size of a boy's head that can actually be worn. The formal Gogatsu Ningyo is displayed on a tiered shelf with a yumi (bow), tachi (long sword), Japanese war fan, and jingasa (samurai hats).

Until the Edo period, samurai dolls were more common than miniature armor and kabuto, and the Japanese folk heroes Momotarō, Kintarō, Ushiwakamaru, Benkei, Emperor Jinmu, and Shoki were often chosen as subjects.

Kashiwa mochi (sticky rice cakes filled with red bean jam and wrapped in oak leaves) and chimaki (sticky sweet rice wrapped in an iris or bamboo leaf) are traditionally served on this day. The oak leaf used for kashiwa mochi is said to be a tree whose old leaves do not fall off until new leaves appear, and is considered a good-luck charm representing prosperity of offspring.

Since irises are believed to have medicinal properties and to ward off evil, they are used for various purposes on Children's Day. For example, people would take a bath with irises in the bathtub, soak thinly sliced iris roots or leaves in sake and drink it, or put irises in thin washi (Japanese traditional paper) before putting it in their pillows and going to bed.

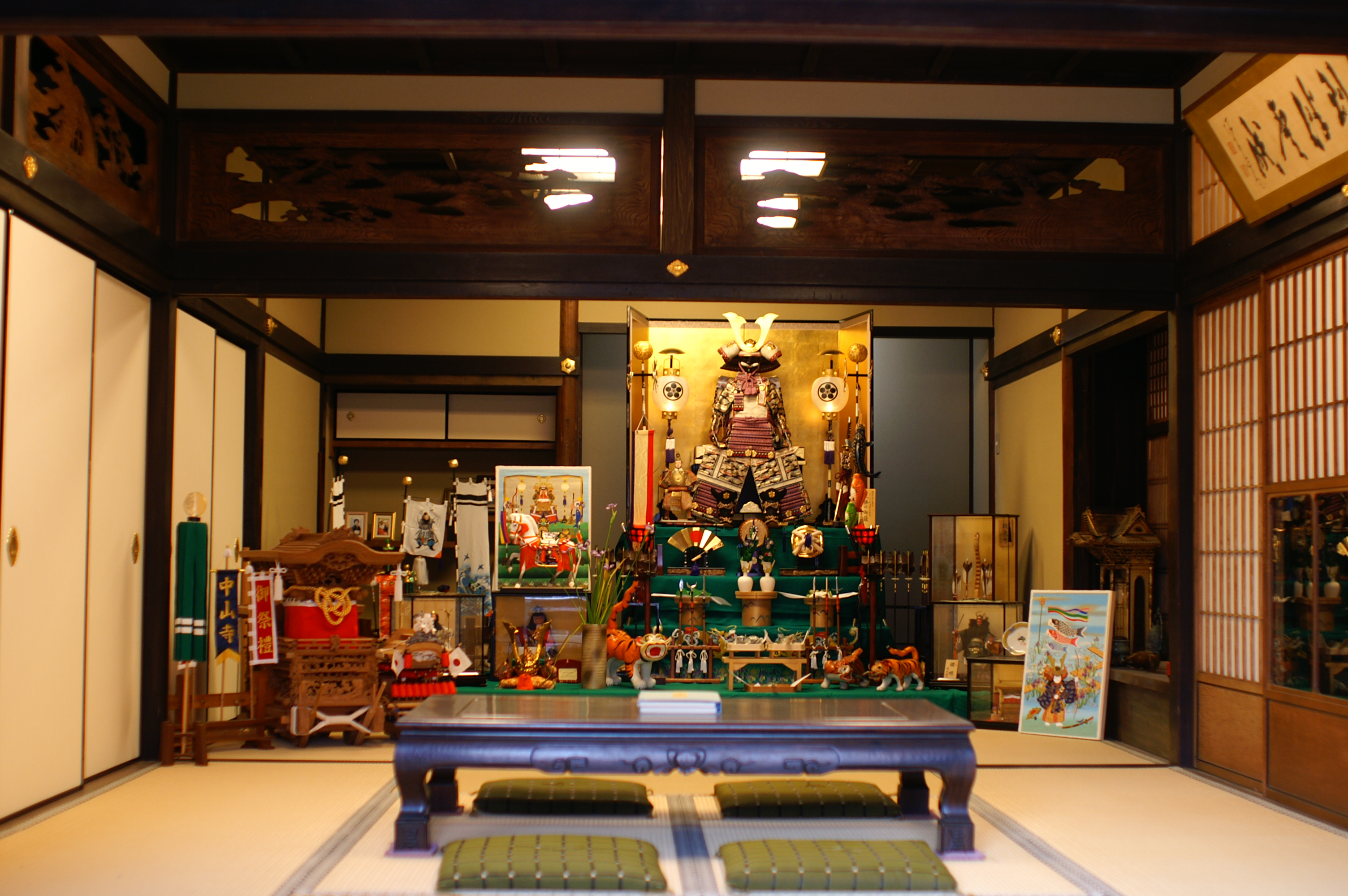
Gogatsu Ningyo at Nakayama-dera.

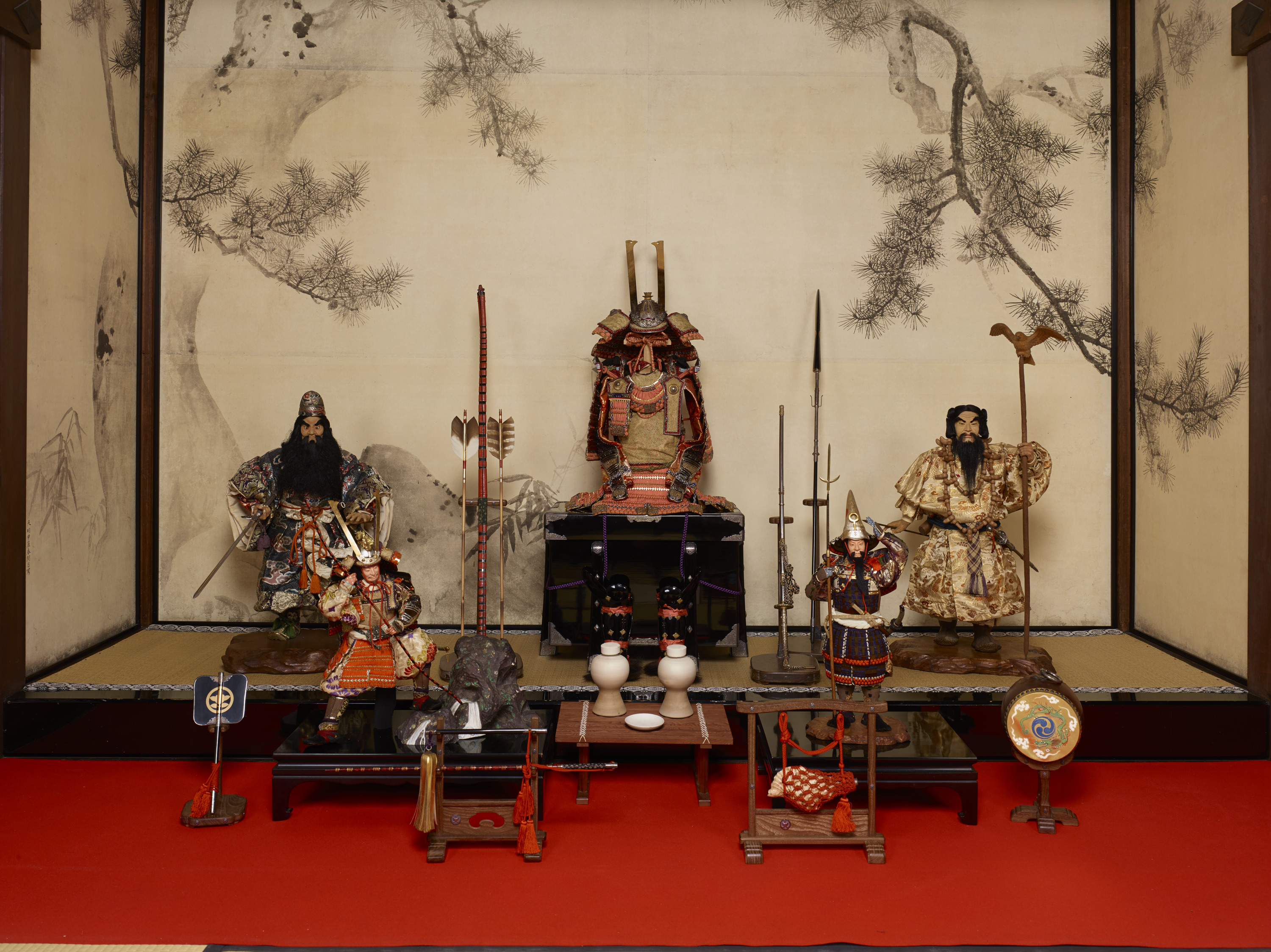
Gogatsu Ningyo from the Taishō era or early Shōwa era. Miniature armor in the ō-yoroi style (center), Samurai dolls featuring Shoki and Emperor Jinmu (back left and right), Samurai dolls wearing armor in the ō-yoroi and tosei gusoku styles (front)

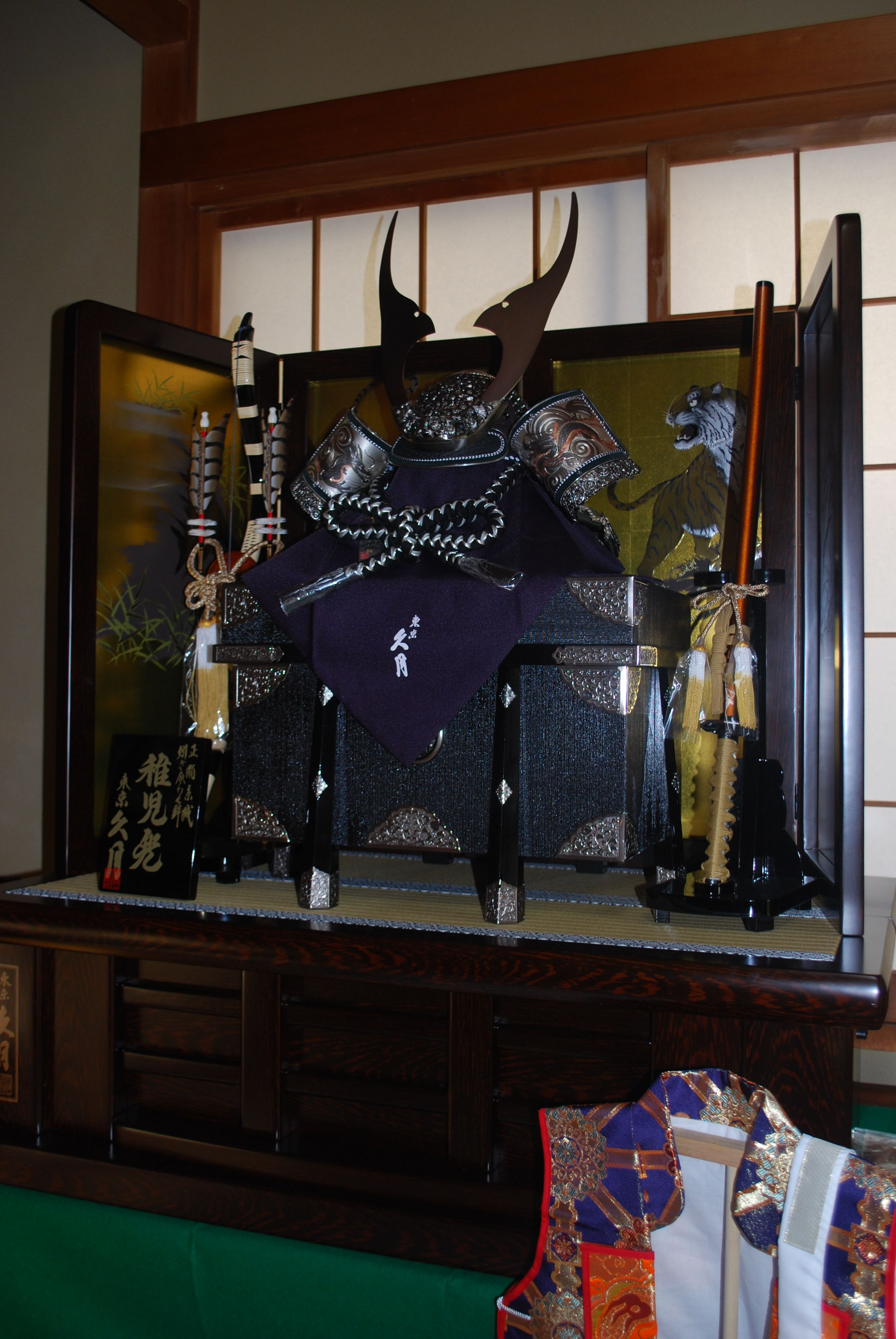
Gogatsu Ningyo (Kabuto type).

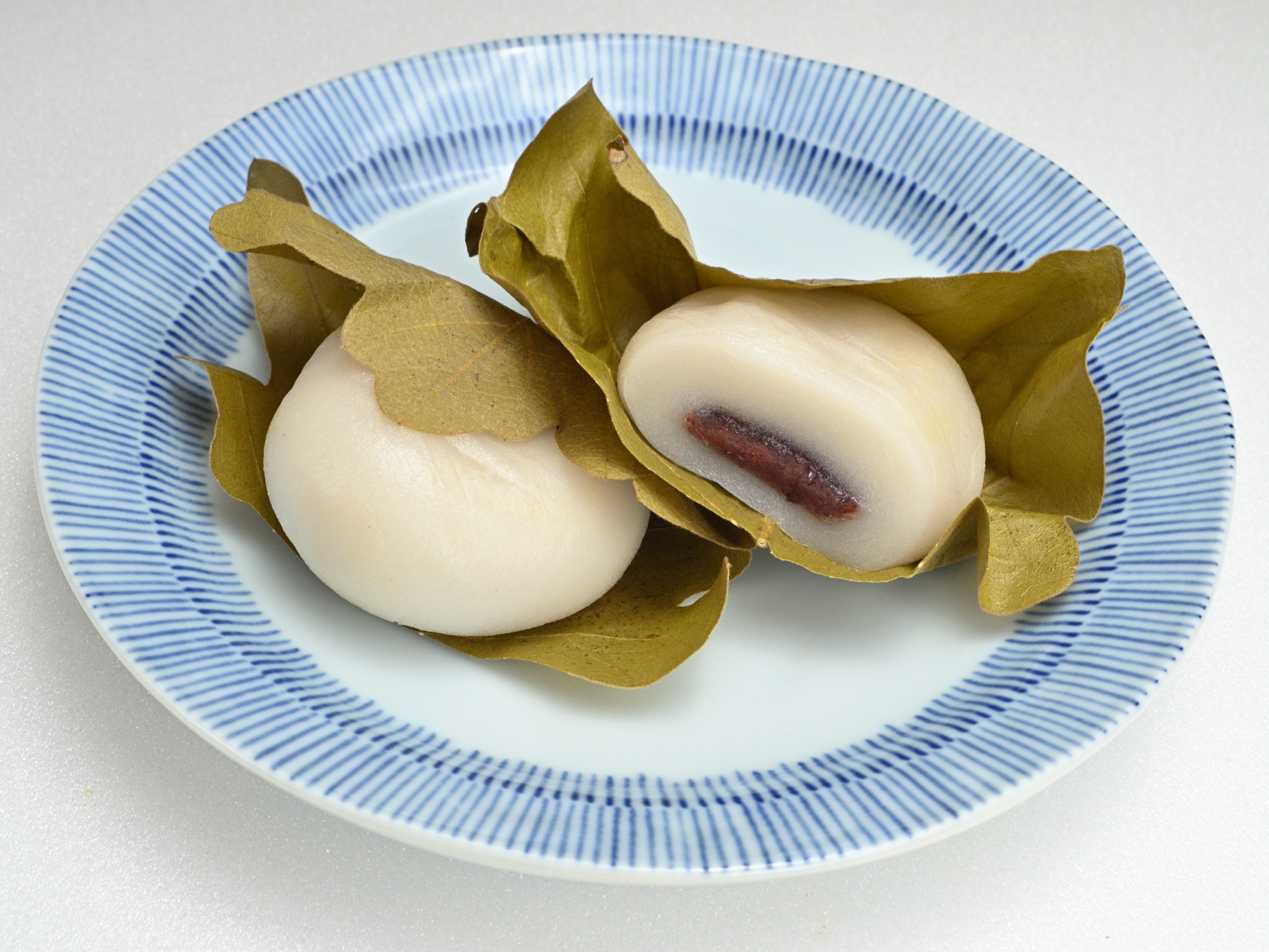
Kashiwa mochi.

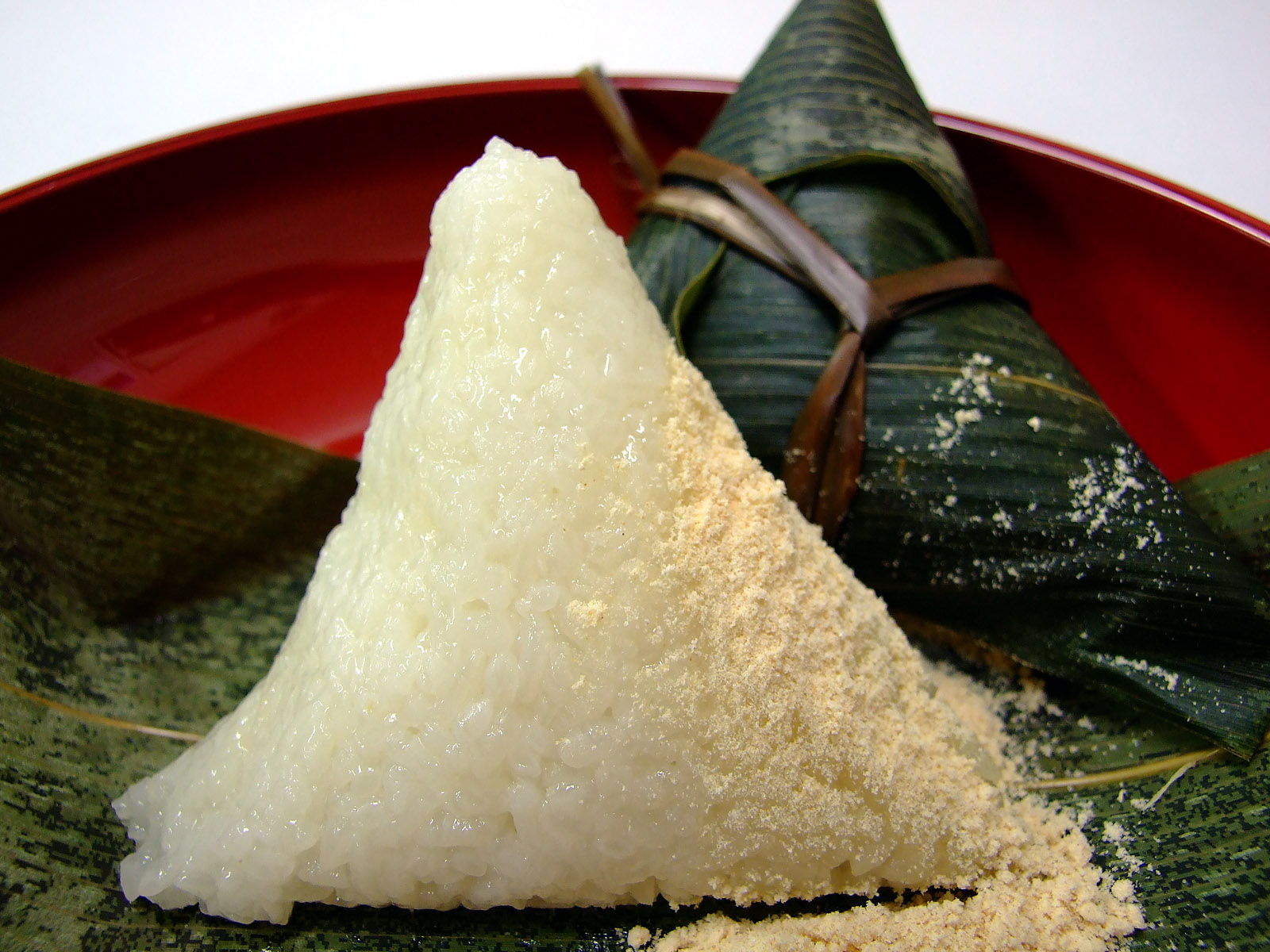
chimaki.

== See also ==
- Shichi-Go-San
- Children's Day
- Double Fifth
- Tết Đoan Ngọ
