= Koinobori =

Japanese carp-shaped windsocks

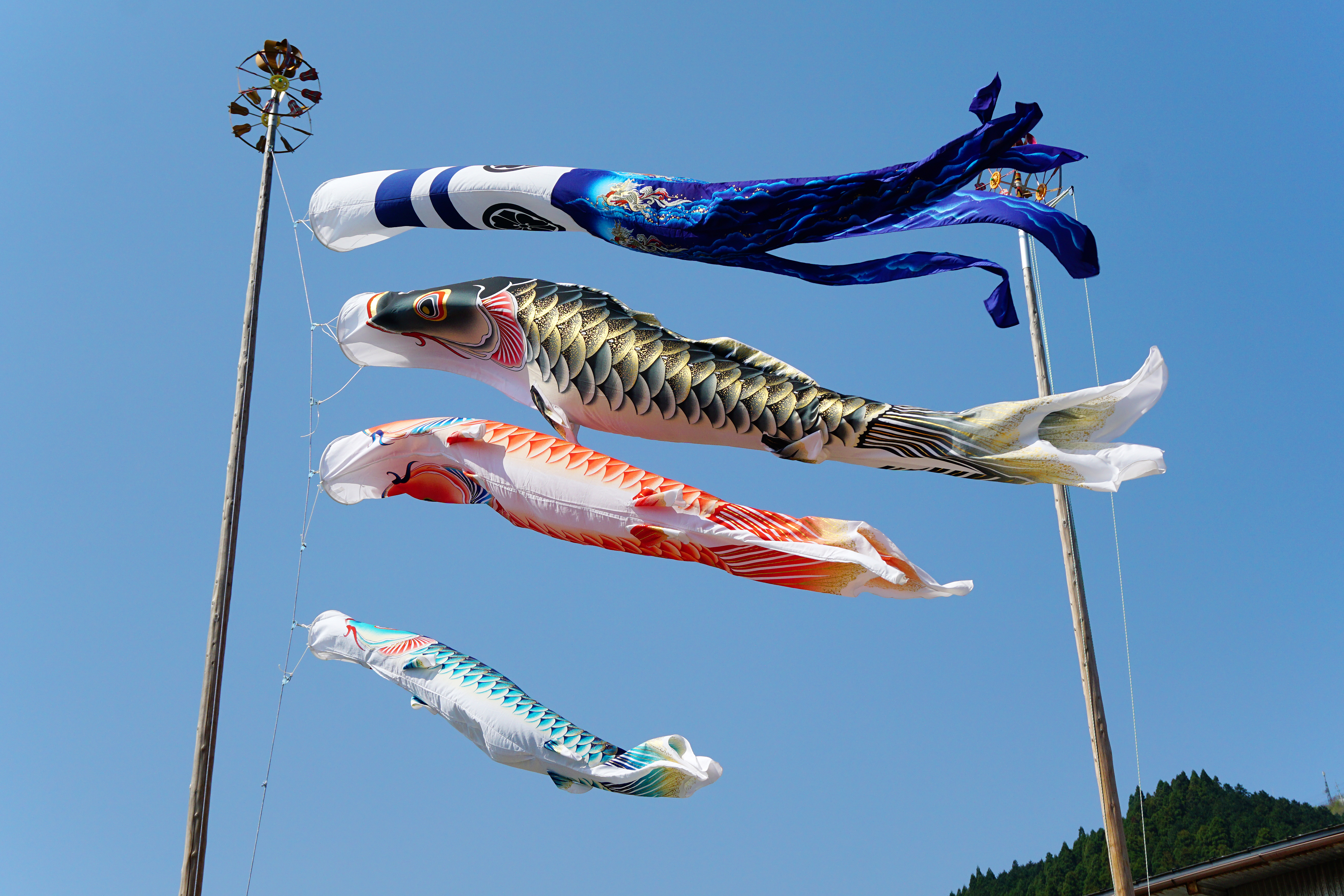
Koinobori at Chizu, Tottori with a patterned windsock at the top

Koinobori (鯉のぼり), meaning 'carp streamer' in Japanese, are carp-shaped windsocks traditionally flown in Japan to celebrate Tango no sekku (端午の節句), a traditional calendrical event which is now designated as Children's Day (子供の日, Kodomo no hi), a national holiday in Japan. Koinobori are made by drawing carp patterns on paper, cloth, or other nonwoven fabric. They are then allowed to flutter in the wind. They are also known as satsuki-nobori (皐のぼり).

Children's Day takes place on May 5, the last day of Golden Week, the largest break for workers and also a week in which many businesses, state schools, and some private schools close for up to 9–10 days for the designated national holidays. Landscapes across Japan are decorated with koinobori from April to early May, in honor of children for a good future and in the hope that they will grow up healthy and strong.

The koinobori is included in Unicode as U+1F38F 🎏 CARP STREAMER.

== Description ==
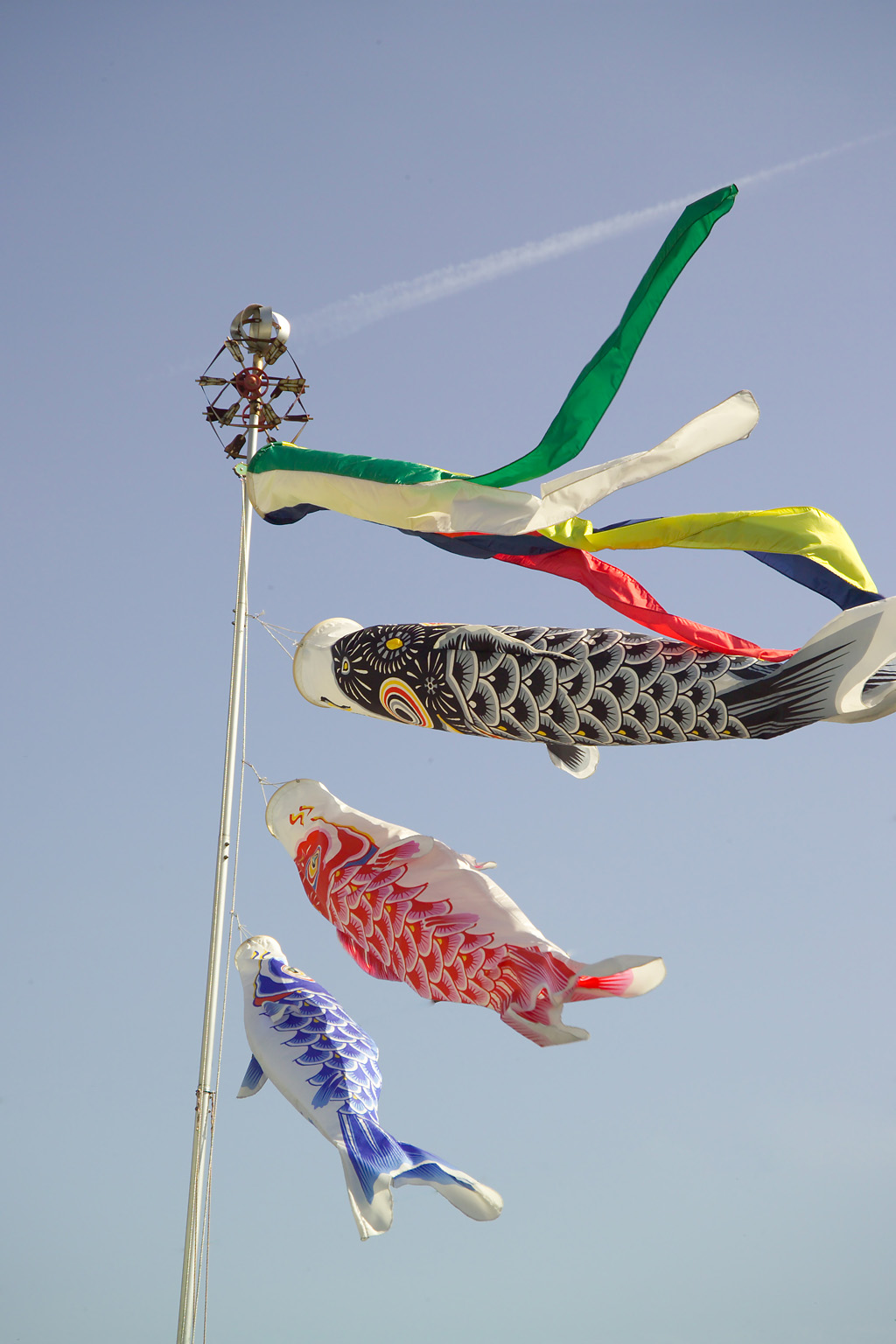
Koinobori with a five-color windsock at the top

A typical koinobori set consists of, from the top of the pole down, a pair of arrow-spoked wheels (矢車, yaguruma) with a ball-shaped spinning vane, a mounting windsock (吹流し, fukinagashi), and finally the koinobori. For the windsock above the koinobori, two main kinds are used: the five-colored windsock (五色吹流し), based on the five elements of Chinese philosophy, and patterned windsocks (柄物吹流し), often featuring a mon (家紋, family crest). The number and meaning of the carp streamers or koinobori that fly beneath the windsock has changed over time. Traditionally, the set would contain a black koinobori representing the father, followed by a smaller, red koinobori representing his eldest son. This is why, according to the Japanese American National Museum, in the traditional "children's song," the red one (higoi) represents the eldest son. If more boys were in the household, an additional blue, green, and then, depending on the region, either purple or orange koinobori were added. After the government's decree that converted Boy's Day (Tango no Sekku) into the present Children's Day (Kodomo no Hi), the holiday came to celebrate the happiness of both boys and girls. As a result, the red koinobori came to represent the mother of the family and it is not uncommon for the color to be varied as pink. Similarly, the other colors and sizes of carp came to represent all the family's children, both sons and daughters.

At present, the koinobori are commonly flown above the roofs of houses with children, with the biggest (black) koinobori for the father, next biggest (red or pink) for the mother, and additional smaller carps of a different color for each child in decreasing order by age.

Koinobori range from a few centimetres to a few metres long. In 1988, a 100 m (330 ft) long koinobori weighing 350 kg (770 lb) was made in Kazo, Saitama.

== History ==
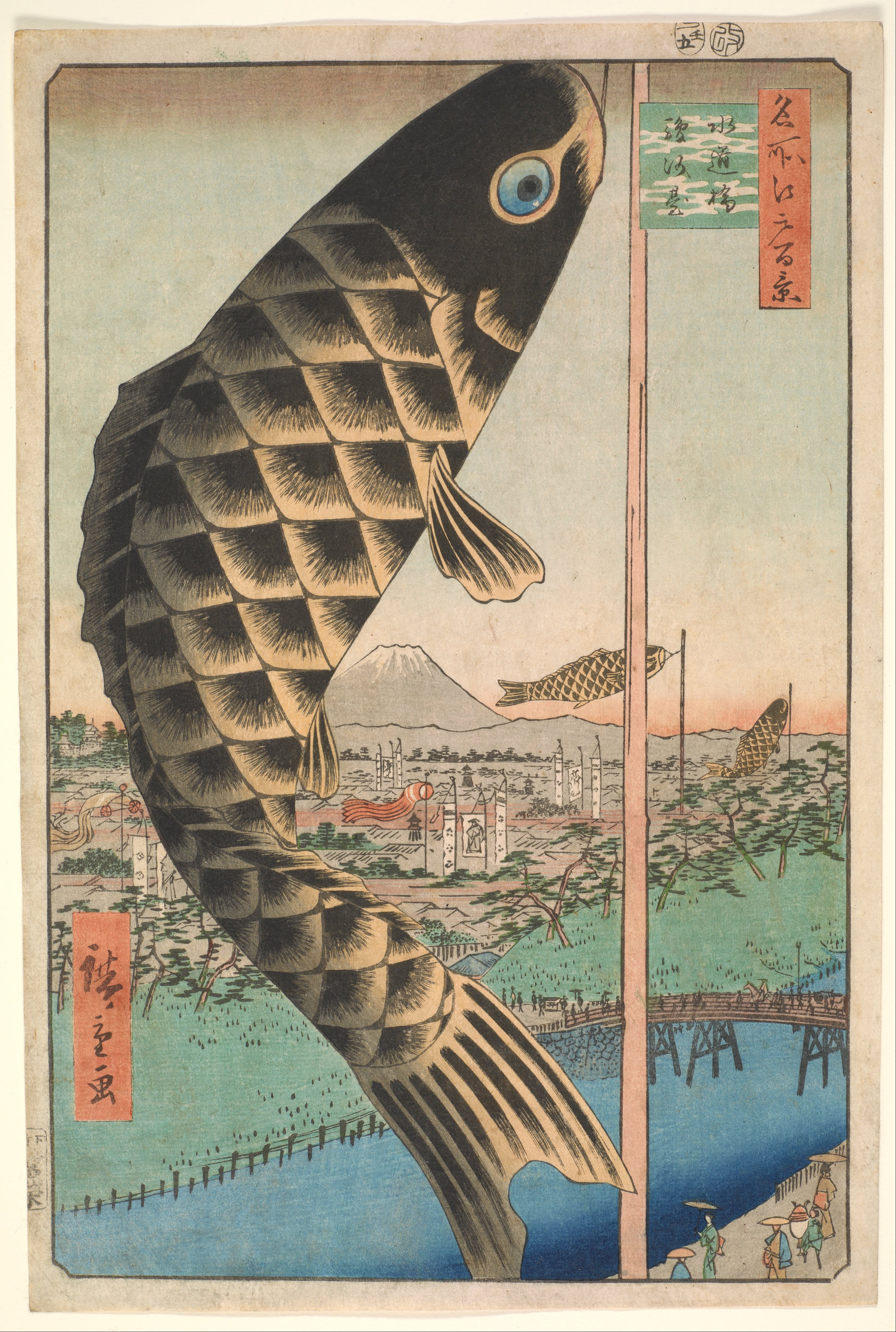
Ukiyo-e showing Koinobori. One of the series One Hundred Famous Views of Edo by Utagawa Hiroshige. 1857, Edo period

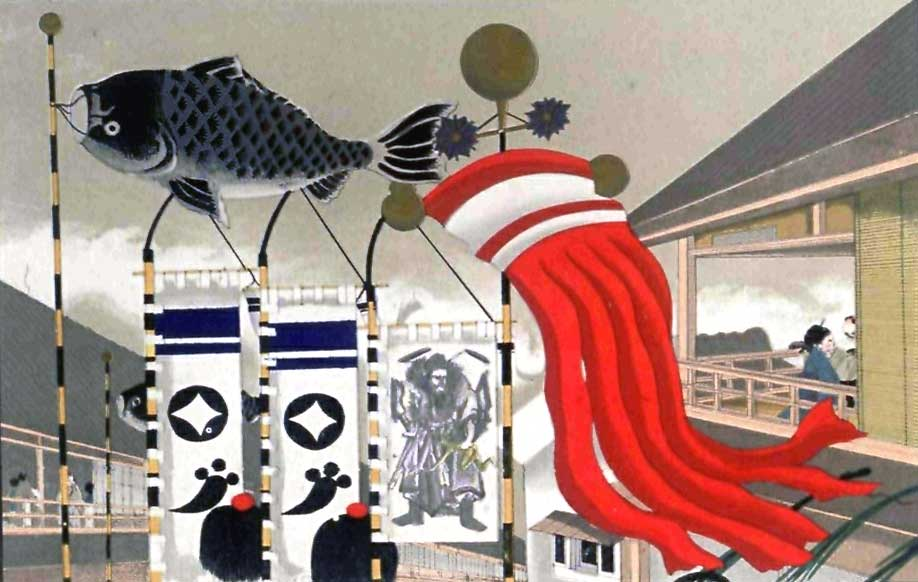
Koinobori, nobori and fukinuke (吹貫). "Japanese Festival in Honor of the Birth of Children" from Sketches of Japanese Manners and Customs, by J.M.W. Silver, illustrated by native drawings, published in London in 1867

Koinobori have been in use since the 18th century. During the Edo period (1603–1867), samurai households began to decorate their yards with nobori or fukinuke (吹貫) flags, which were colored with mon (family crests) to represent military units, during Tango no Sekku. The nobori and fukinuke were then merged, and the first koinobori appeared in Edo (now Tokyo). The colorful koinobori as they are modernly known became popular in the Meiji era (1868–1912).

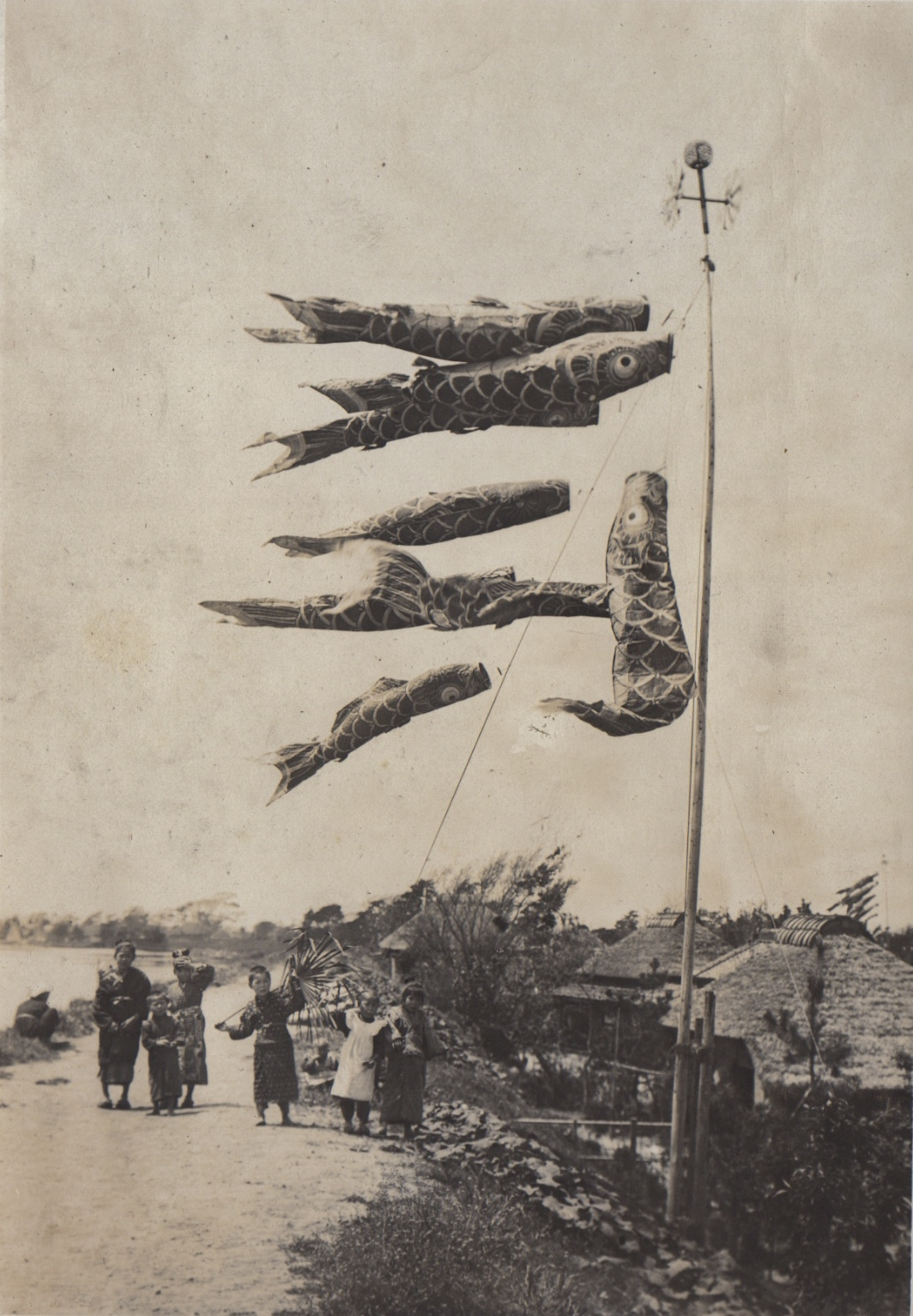
"Fish kites", Tango no Sekku, 1911

Though originally exclusive to samurai households, they eventually reached the rest of the population. They were traditionally flown as part of the Japanese Boys' Day, with one carp for each son, while girls found a counterpart to this custom in hinamatsuri 'Doll's Day'. However, after the redesignation of May 5th as Children's Day in 1948, some families began flying koi for every child, regardless of gender. Despite this, the connection between the koinobori and male children remains, and many families still do not fly them for their daughters. The koi, known for its ability to swim upstream, represents courage, determination, and the hope that children will grow up healthily. This symbolism pays homage to the myth of longmen from the late Han dynasty, that a golden carp swam up a waterfall at the end of the Yellow River and became a dragon.

The number of koinobori included on a pole and the variety of their colors have increased over time to accommodate more family members. They were originally made by hand-painting materials such as paper or cloth, but these have almost entirely fallen out of use in favour of synthetics, outside of some rural areas. Silk and paper models are still sold, but at a higher price than the synthetics.

Related Tango no sekku traditions include kite-flying, kite-fighting, the display of samurai dolls and miniature Japanese armor and helmets (kabuto) in the home, the bathing with iris in the bathtub, the consumption of Kashiwa mochi (sticky rice cakes wrapped in oak leaves) and shōbu-sake (sake soaked with thinly sliced iris root and leaves), and, in some areas, the tradition of making young boys crawl through the koinobori for good fortune. As a tradition, throughout Children's Day, children also thank and show respect for relatives, parents, and teachers for support throughout their life.

== Koinobori song ==
A famous koinobori song often sung by children and their families. It was published in Ehon shōka haru no maki (Picture Songbook, Spring) in 1932. The lyrics are by Miyako Kondō (近藤宮子). The composer is unknown.

Original Japanese:

屋根より 高い 鯉のぼり
大きい 真鯉は お父さん
小さい 緋鯉は 子供たち
面白そうに 泳いでる

Rōmaji:

yane yori takai koinobori
ōkii magoi wa otōsan
chiisai higoi wa kodomo-tachi
omoshirosō ni oyoideru

English translation:

Higher than the roof-tops are the koinobori
The large carp is the father
The smaller carp are the children
They seem to be having fun swimming.

== Gallery ==
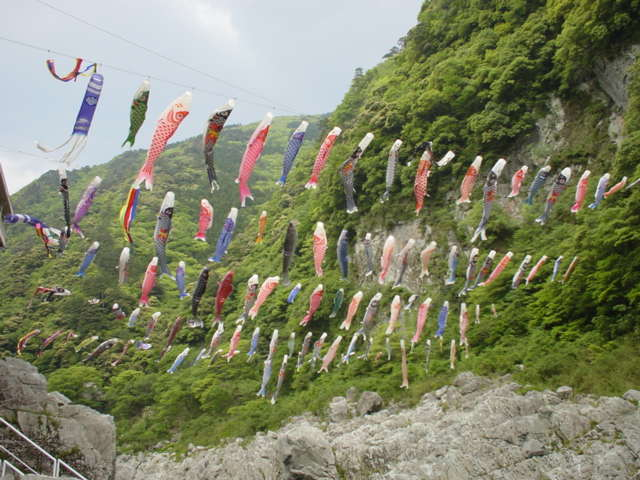
Koinobori flying in Oboke Koboke, Iya Valley, Tokushima Prefecture

A large selection of koinobori in Higashishirahige Park, 2015

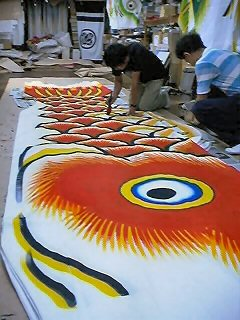
Factory for large hand-made koinobori

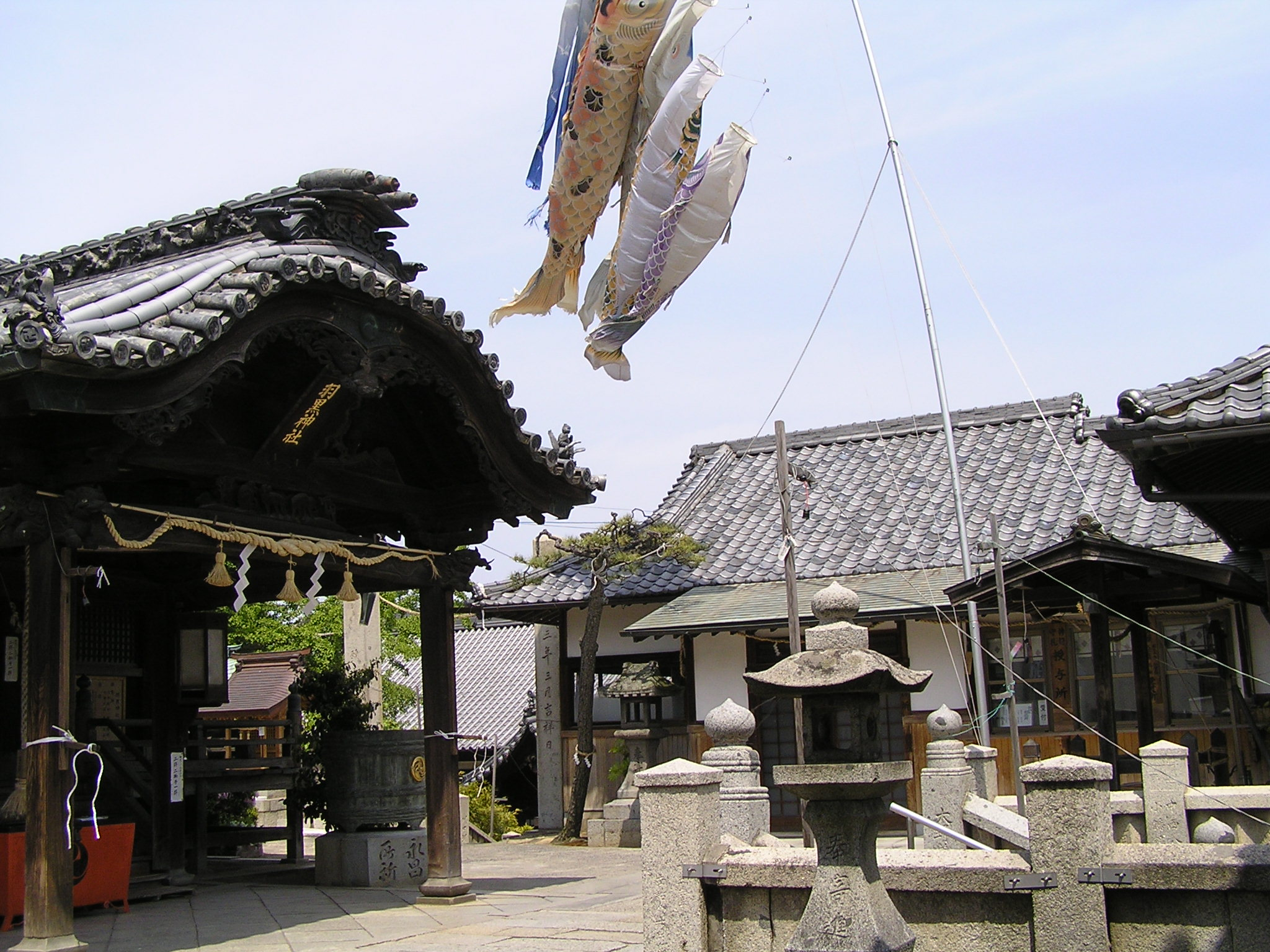
At Haguro Shinto shrine, Kurashiki

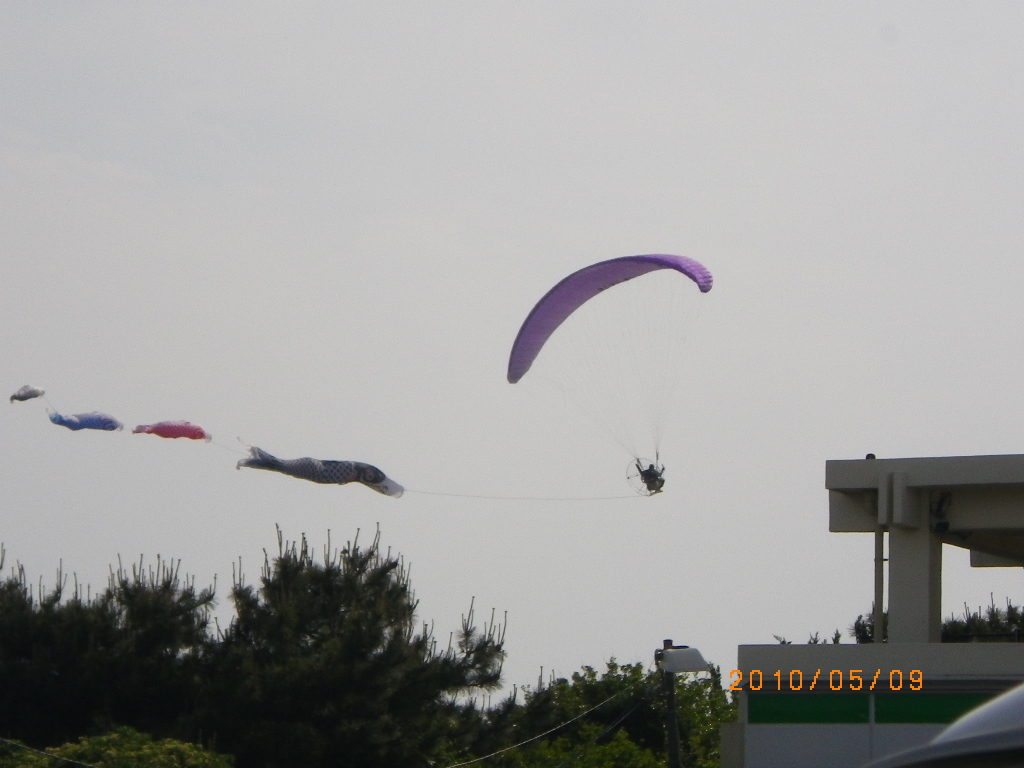
Paragliding with Koinobori

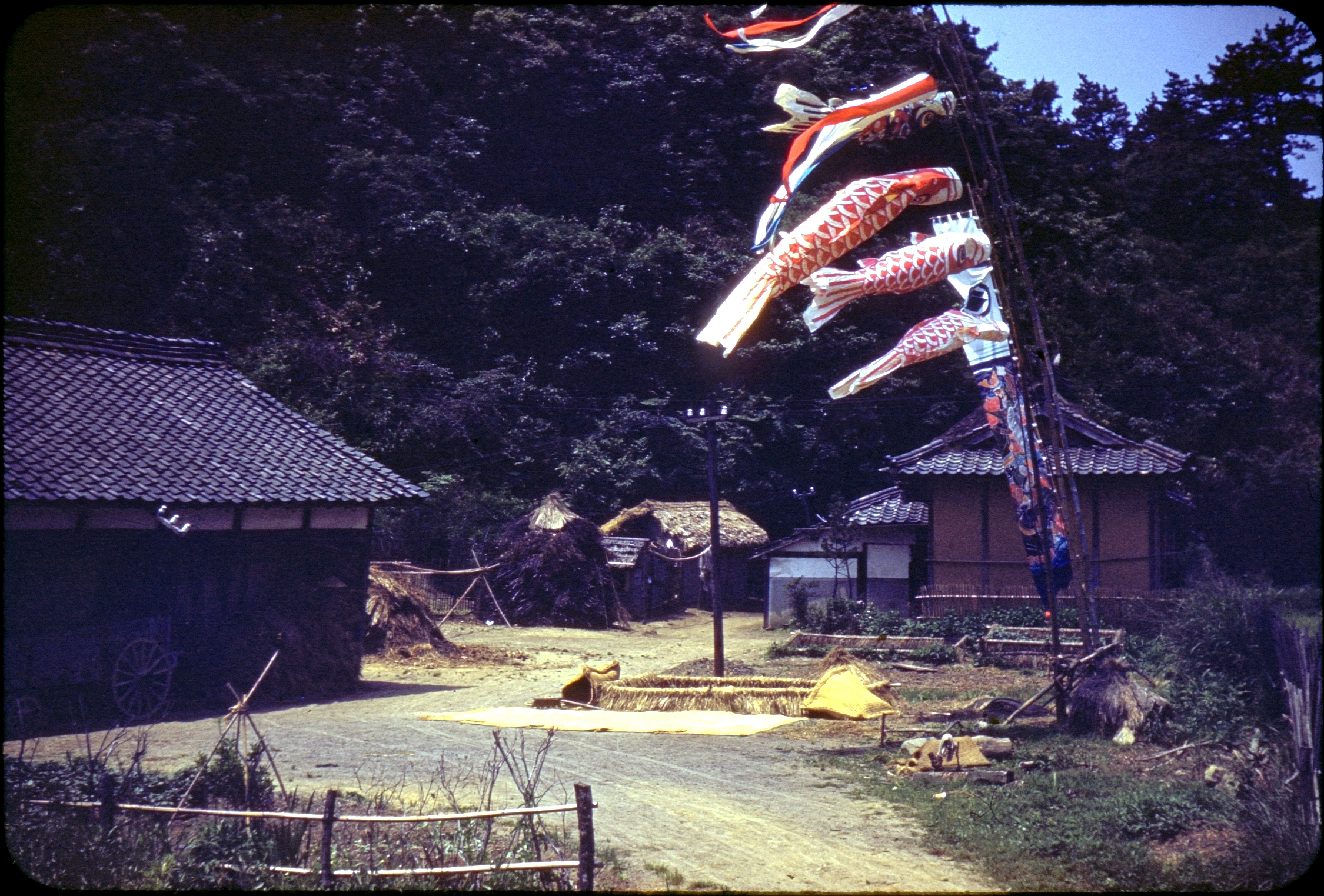
Koinobori at a rural home, 1955

== See also ==
- Dragon Boat Festival
