= Double Fifth Festival (disambiguation) =

The Double Fifth Festival can refer to one of several festivals held on the 5th day of the 5th month in the local lunisolar calendars within the East Asian cultural sphere, or Gregorian calendar for Japan. Including:

- Dragon Boat Festival in Greater China
- Tango no sekku in Japan
- Dano (festival) in Korea
- Tết Đoan Ngọ in Vietnam
- Yukka Nu Hii in Okinawa
