= Ikeda Koson =

Japanese painter

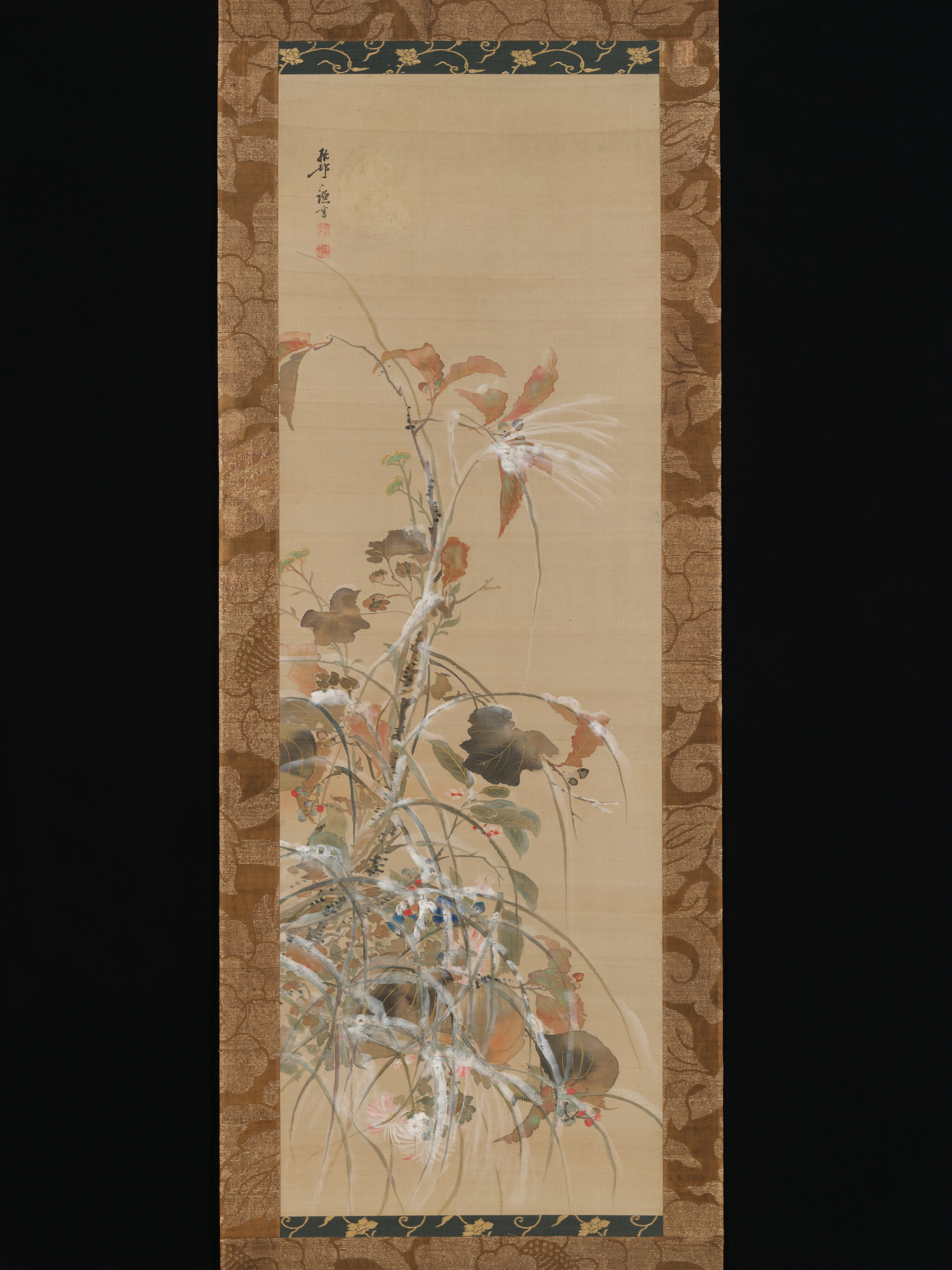

Ikeda Koson (池田 孤邨; Echigo Province 1801 – 1866) was a Japanese painter.

Little is known about Koson's early life. He moved to Edo and studied painting with Sakai Hōitsu (1761-1828). He created a series of paintings that are closely related to a set by Hoitsu depicting court festivals (gosekku), that were adapted from Chinese practices and celebrated in Japan since the Nara period.

According to New York's Metropolitan Museum of Art, Koson "brought a fresh vitality to standard themes in the Rinpa repertoire through his virtuoso brushwork and ability to convey naturalistic forms without sacrificing the bold decorative impact of his predecessors."
