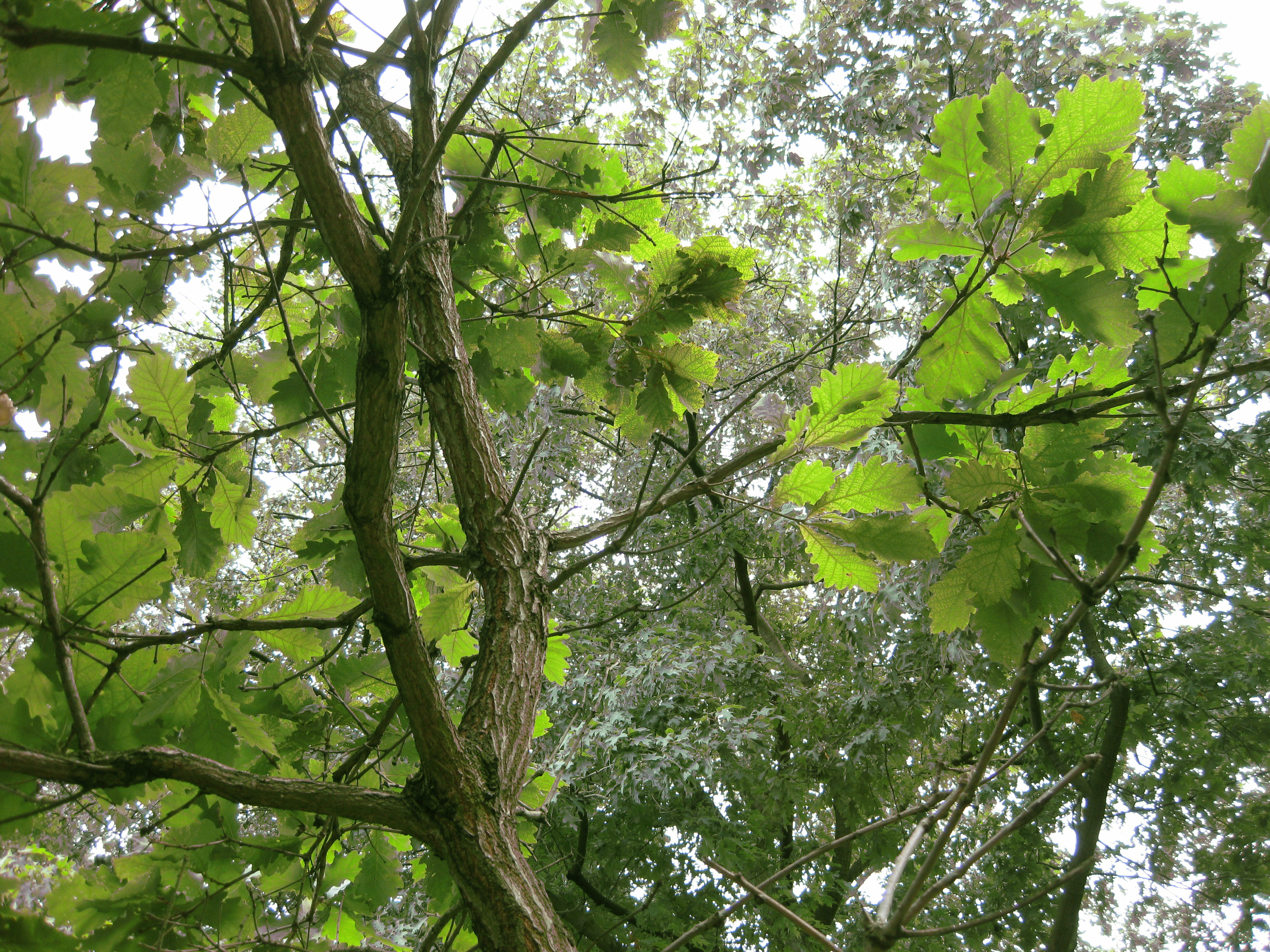

Conservation status
- Least Concern (IUCN 3.1)

Scientific classification
- Kingdom: Plantae
- Clade: Embryophytes
- Clade: Tracheophytes
- Clade: Spermatophytes
- Clade: Angiosperms
- Clade: Eudicots
- Clade: Rosids
- Order: Fagales
- Family: Fagaceae
- Genus: Quercus
- Subgenus: Quercus subg. Quercus
- Section: Quercus sect. Quercus
- Species: Q. dentata

Binomial name
- Quercus dentata Thunb.

Subspecies
- Quercus dentata subsp. dentata; Quercus dentata subsp. stewardii (Rehder) A.Camus; Quercus dentata subsp. yunnanensis (Franch.) Menitsky

Synonyms
- List: Quercus dentata subsp. eudentata A.Camus synonyms of subsp. dentata: Quercus coreana Nakai; Quercus daimio K.Koch; Quercus dentata var. fallax Nakai; Quercus dentata f. fallax (Nakai) W.Lee; Quercus dentata var. grandifolia Koidz.; Quercus dentata f. grandifolia (Koidz.) Kitag.; Quercus dentata var. laciniata Makino; Quercus dentata var. pinnatifida Matsum.; Quercus dentata f. pinnatifida (Matsum.) Rehder; Quercus dentata var. pinnatiloba Makino; Quercus dentata var. pinnatiloba Makino; Quercus dentata var. skworzovii Kozlov; Quercus dentata var. wrightii A.DC.; Quercus obovata Bunge; Quercus pinnatifida Franch. & Sav. synonyms of subsp. stewardii: Quercus stewardii Rehder synonyms of subsp. yunnanensis: Castanopsis yunnanensis (Franch.) H.Lév.; Quercus aliena var. urticifolia (Franch.) Skan; Quercus dentata var. oxyloba Franch.; Quercus dentata var. yunnanensis (Franch.) A.Camus; Quercus dentatoides Liou; Quercus griffithii var. urticifolia Franch.; Quercus malacotricha A.Camus; Quercus oxyloba (Franch.) Liou; Quercus yuii Liou; Quercus yunnanensis Franch.

= Quercus dentata =

Daimyo oak

Species of oak tree

Quercus dentata, also called Japanese emperor oak, daimyo oak, or Korean oak (Japanese: 柏, kashiwa; traditional Chinese: 柞櫟; simplified Chinese: 柞栎; pinyin: zuòlì; Korean: 떡갈나무, tteokgalnamu), is a species of oak native to East Asia, including north-central and southern China, Japan, Korea, the Russian Far East (Khabarovsk and Primorsky krais and the Kuril Islands), Manchuria, Mongolia, and Taiwan. The name of the tree is often translated as "sweet oak" in English to distinguish it from Western varieties. It is placed in section Quercus.

== Description ==
Quercus dentata is a deciduous tree growing up to 20–25 metres (66–82 feet) tall, with a trunk up to 1 m (3 ft 3 in) in diameter. Its foliage is remarkable for its size, among the largest of all oaks, consisting of a short hairy petiole, 1–1.5 centimetres (3/8–5/8 inch) long, and a blade 10–40 cm (4–15 1/2 in) long and 15–30 cm (6–12 in) broad, with a shallowly lobed margin; the form is reminiscent of an enormous pedunculate oak leaf. The leaves are often retained dead on the tree into winter. Both sides of the leaf are initially downy with the upper surface becoming smooth.

The flowers are produced in May; the male flowers are pendulous catkins. The female flowers are sessile, growing near the tips of new shoots, producing acorns 1.2–2.3 cm long and 1.2–1.5 cm broad, in broad, bushy-scaled cups; the acorns mature in September to October.

== Ecology ==
Quercus dentata (Qd) cannot tolerate the extreme cold of northern Hokkaido, but Quercus crispula (Qc) can. In more southerly parts of Hokkaido, Q. dentata lives in coastal areas while Q. crispula tends to live more inland. In the more northern parts of the island, these two species have experienced introgression and they are interfertile, producing shoots that grow and can reproduce; resulting in a coastal Qc ecotype with Qd-like traits. The coastal Qc are intermediary between the two parent species in genotypes and phenotypes.

== Cultivation outside East Asia ==
Quercus dentata was introduced to the British Isles in 1830, where it is occasionally grown in botanical gardens. It is usually smaller in cultivation than in the wild, growing to a small angular tree or large irregular shrub. Notable specimens include one at Osterley Park, 14 m (46 ft) tall and 1.5 m girth, and the largest, 18 m (59 ft) tall, at Avondale Forest Park, County Wicklow, Ireland.

== Culinary uses ==
In Korean cuisine, its acorns (in Hangul: 도토리, dotori) have been used since the Three Kingdoms. A notable food is dotorimuk.

In Japanese cuisine, its leaves are used as a wrapping for kashiwa mochi.

== Gallery ==
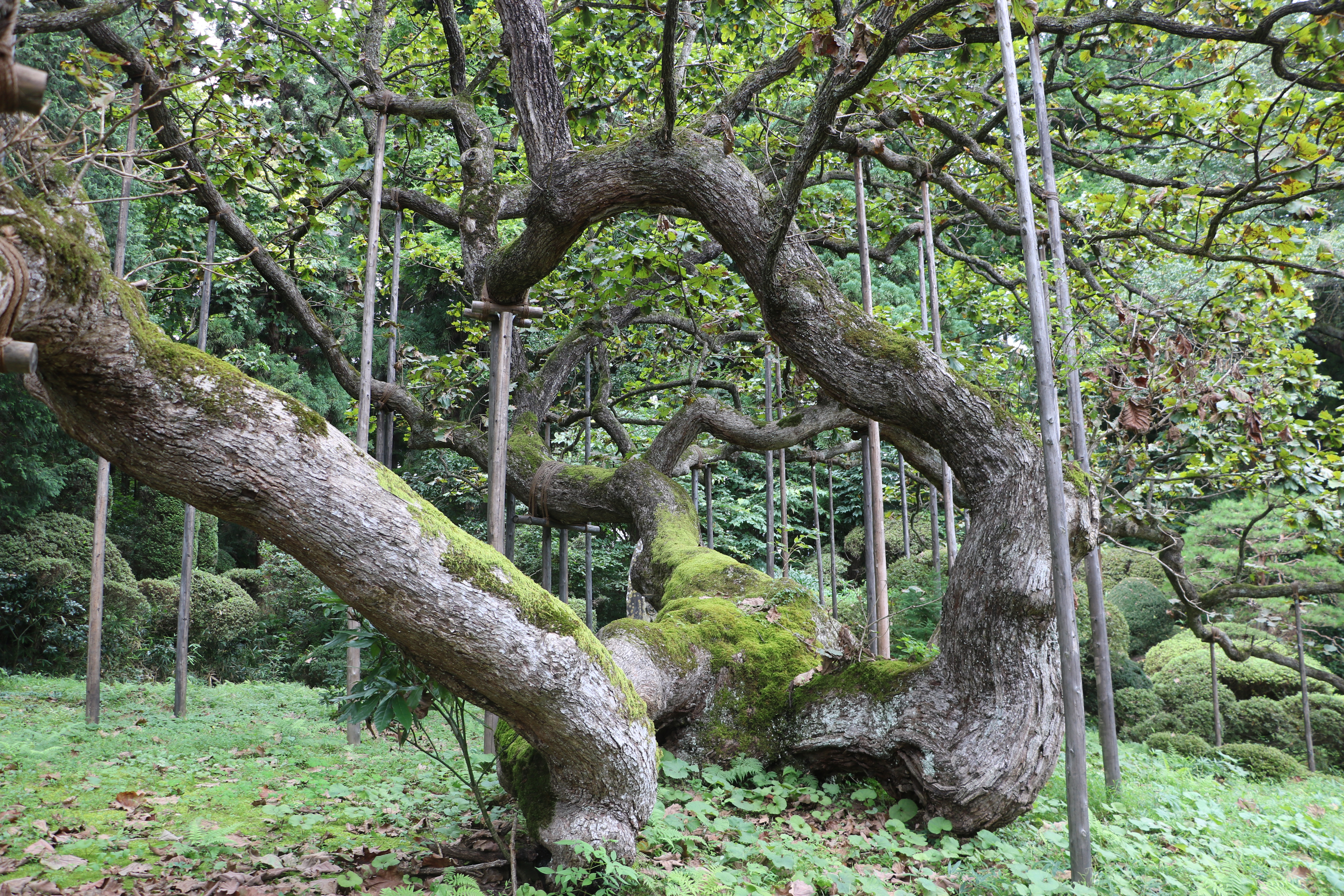
Large emperor oak at Shogen-in Temple in Iwate Prefecture

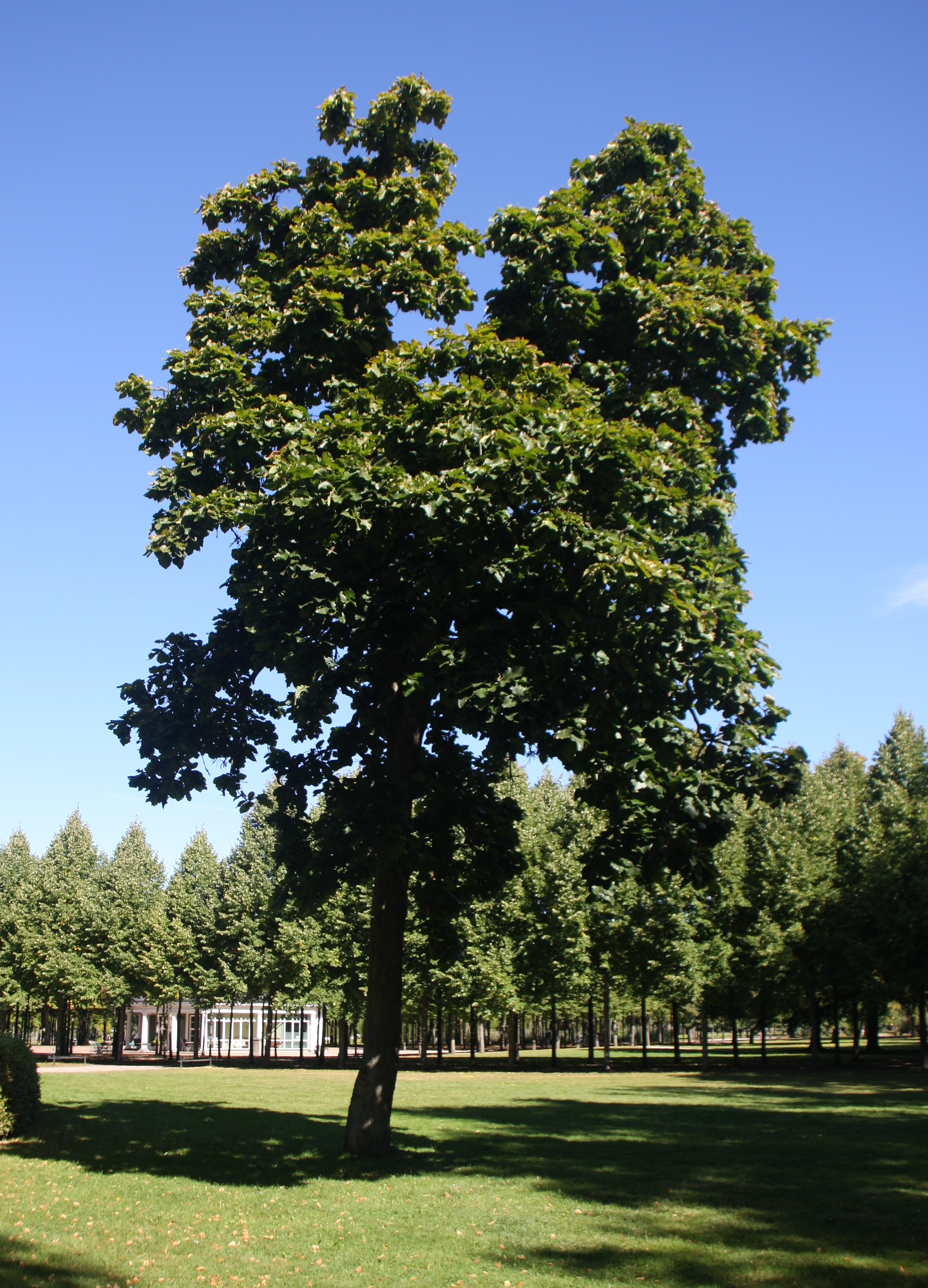
At Schwerin Castle in Germany

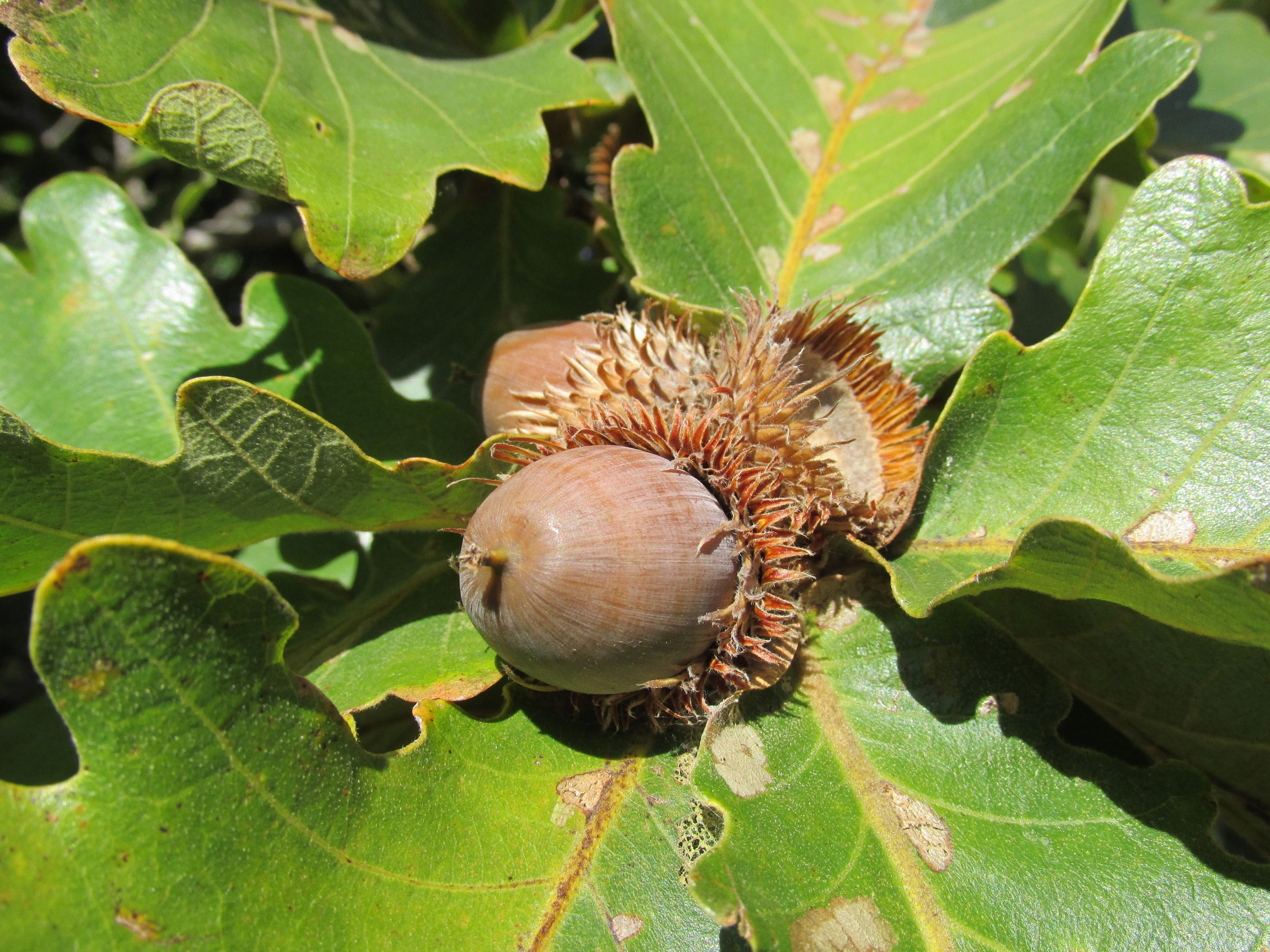
Acorn

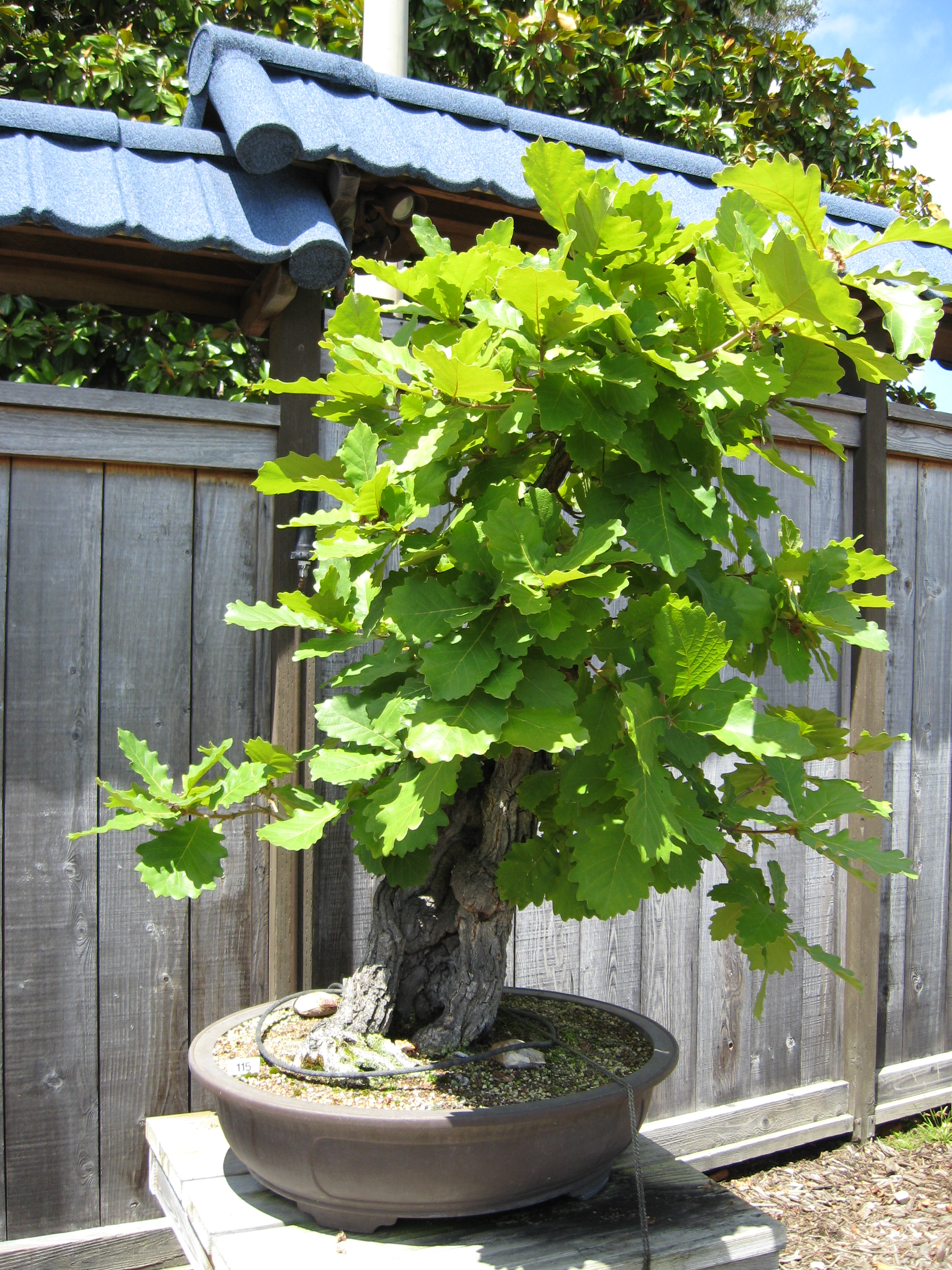
Emperor oak as bonsai

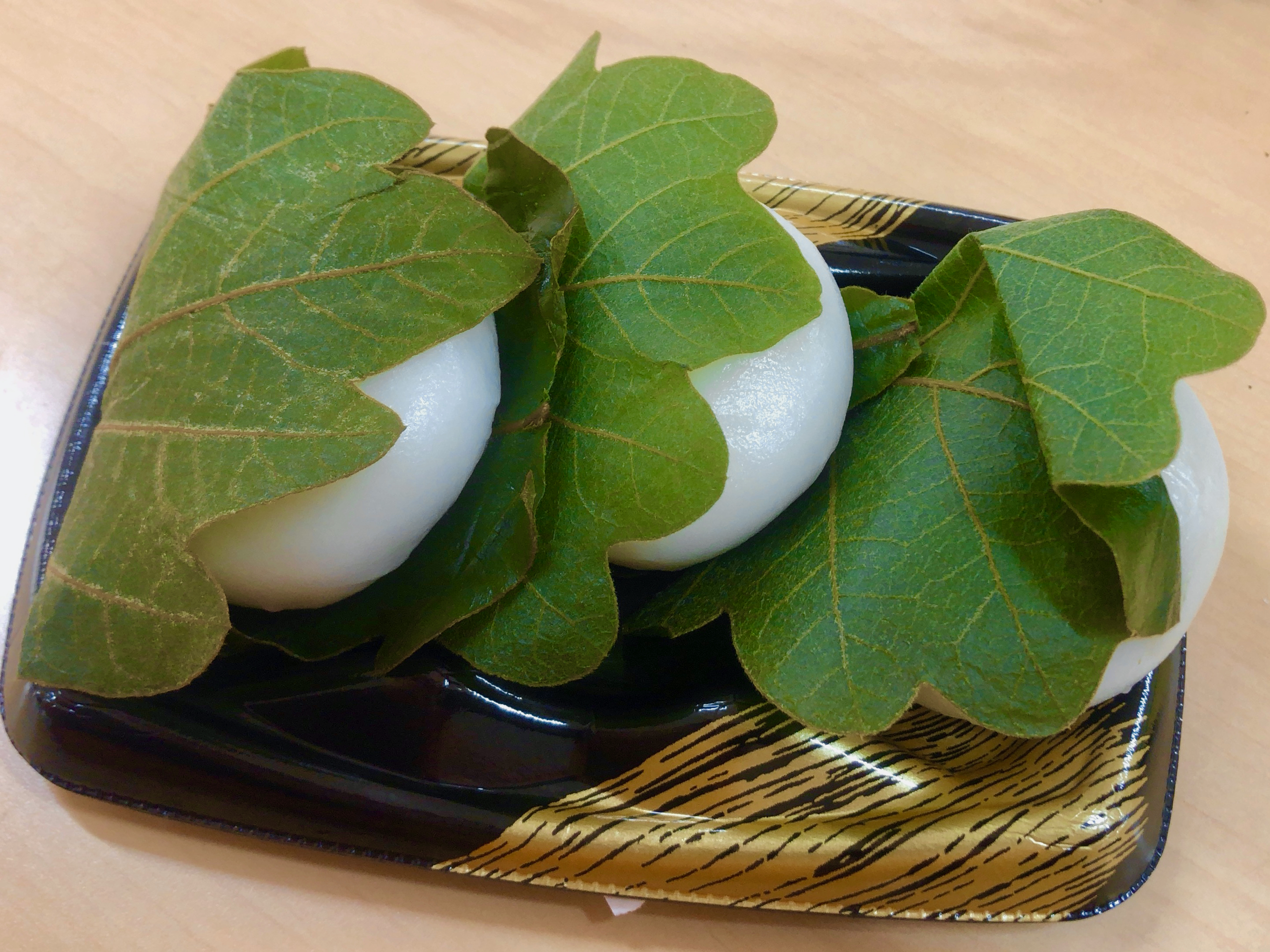
Kashiwa-mochi, Japanese rice cakes wrapped in oak leaves

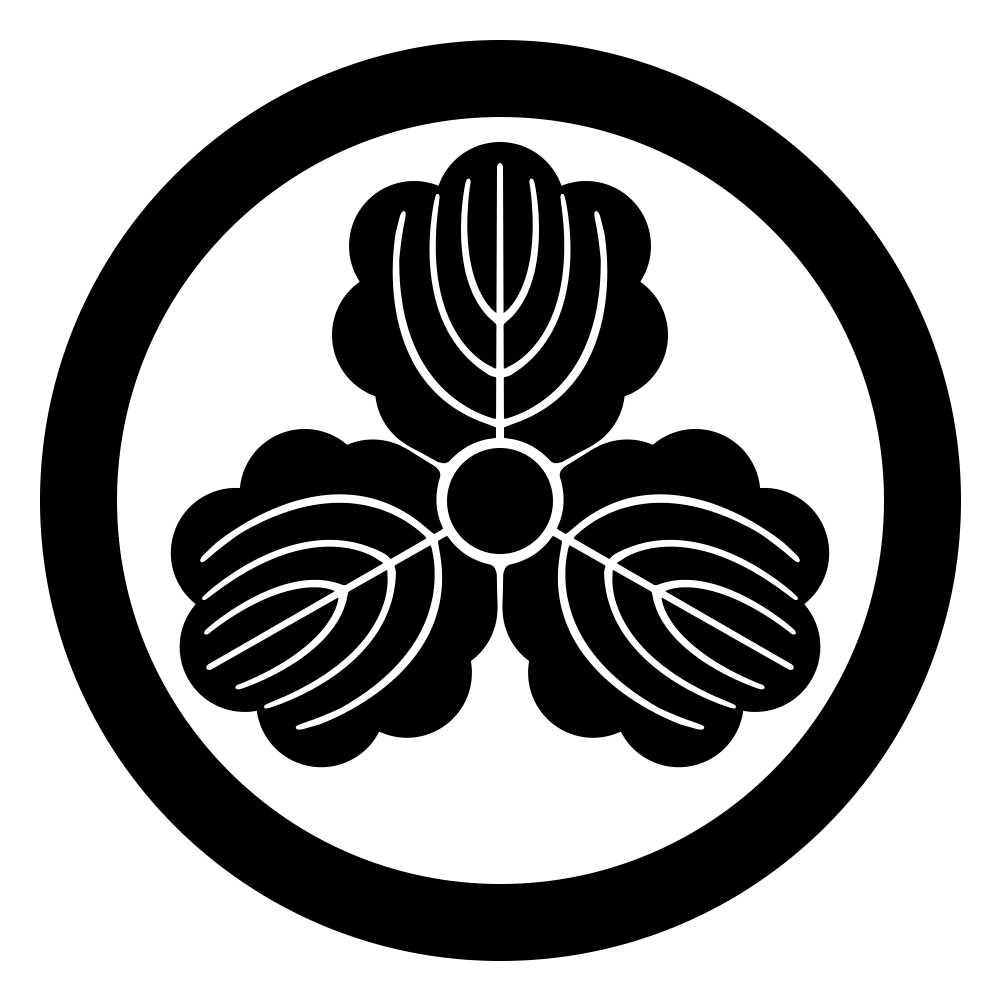
Japanese mon (family crest) depicting three kashiwa leaves
