= Tango no sekku =

Japanese festival held on May 5

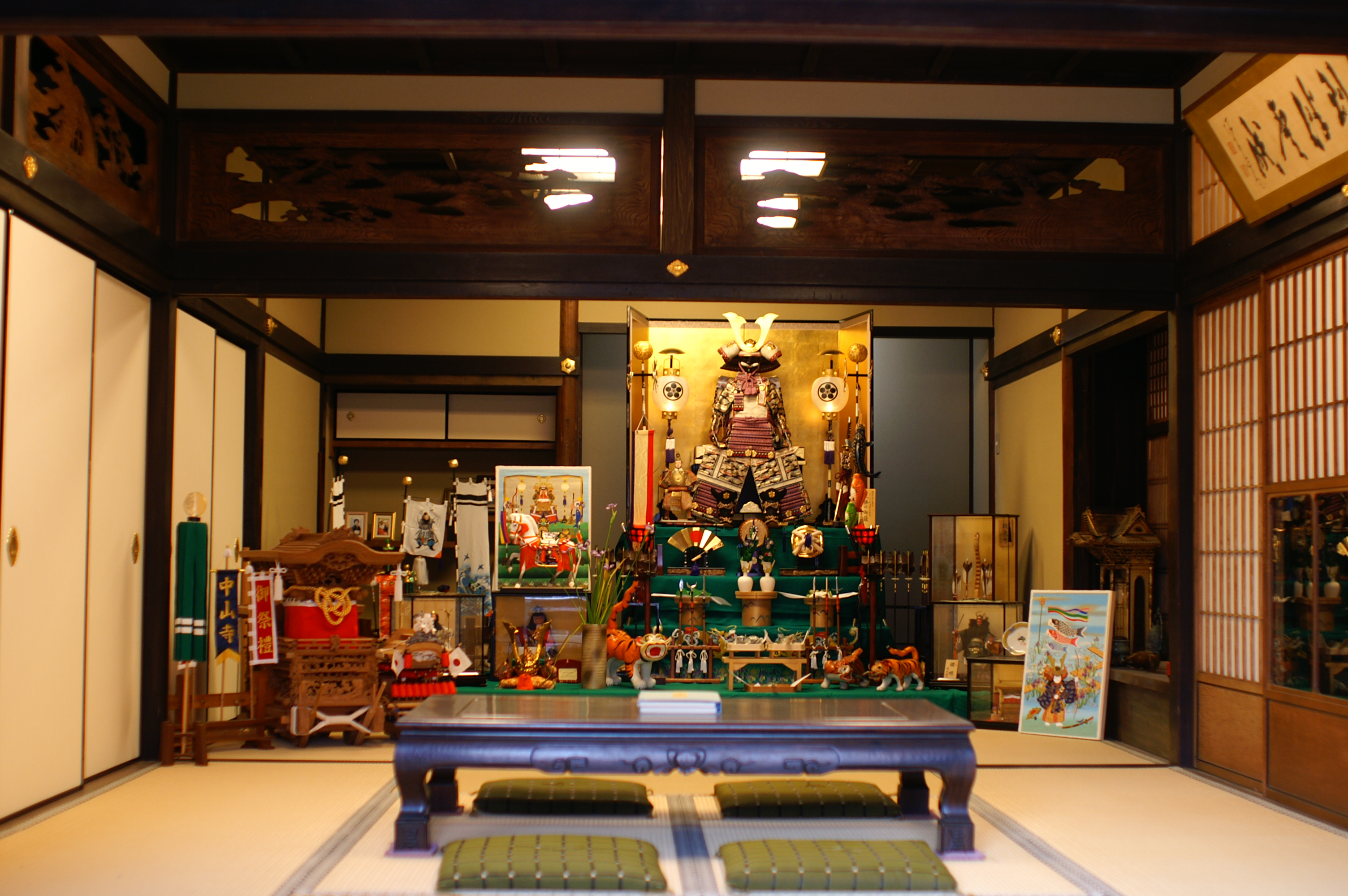
Gogatsu Ningyo (五月人形, May doll) at Nakayama-dera.

Tango no Sekku (端午の節句), also known as Ayame no hi (Iris festival), originally referred to an annual ceremony held at the Japanese imperial court on May 6. It was one of the five annual court ceremonies called Gosekku. Since the Kamakura period (1185–1333), when the samurai class seized power, Tango no Sekku has become an event to ward off evil spirits for samurai boys. Japanese armour, kabuto (helmets) and Japanese swords were displayed in houses from the Kamakura period to the Muromachi period (1333–1573). From the Edo period (1603–1867), samurai dolls (武者人形, musha ningyo) were displayed in homes, koinobori (carp streamers) were hung in gardens. From this period, the custom of decorating houses with offerings on Tango no Sekku spread to the peasant and chōnin classes, and paper kabuto began to be displayed. Since the Showa era (1926–1989), miniatures of samurai armor have become more popular than samurai dolls.

Until recently, Tango no Sekku was known as Boys' Day (also known as Feast of Banners) while Girls' Day (Hinamatsuri) was celebrated on March 3. In 1948, the government decreed this day to be a national holiday to celebrate the happiness of all children and to express gratitude toward mothers. It was renamed Kodomo no Hi (Children's Day) and changed to include both boys and girls.

It is the Japanese equivalent of Double Fifth and was celebrated on the fifth day of the fifth moon in the lunisolar calendar. After Japan switched to the Gregorian calendar, the date was moved to May 5 (the fifth day of the fifth solar month). Other festivals celebrated on the same date in the lunisolar calendar include the Duanwu Festival or Tuen Ng Festival (Cantonese) in mainland China, Hong Kong, Macau, and Taiwan, the Dano Festival in Korea, and Tết Đoan Ngọ in Vietnam.

== Etymology ==
Tan (端) means 'beginning' and go (午) is a simplified form of 'horse' (⾺), referring to the Chinese zodiac name for the fifth lunar month. Days of the week also have zodiac animals. Thus, tango originally meant 'the first horse day of the fifth month'. However, go is a homonym for five (五) in Japanese, so during the Nara period the meaning shifted to become the fifth day of the fifth month. Sekku means a seasonal festival. There are five sekku, including Jinjitsu (January 7), Jōshi (Hinamatsuri, March 3), Shichiseki (Tanabata, July 7) and Chōyō (Kiku Matsuri, September 9), along with Tango no Sekku. Tango no Sekku marks the beginning of summer or the rainy season.

== History ==
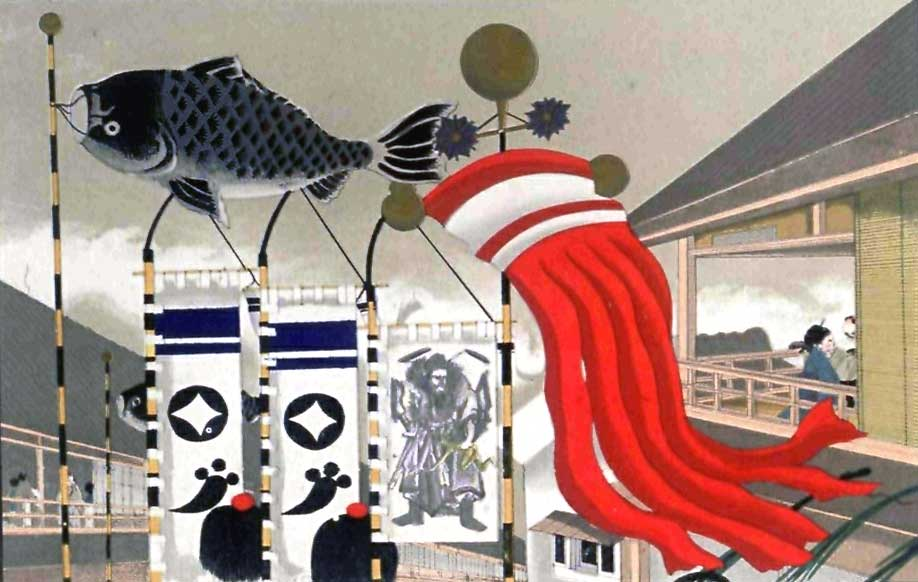
Koinobori, nobori and fukinuke (吹貫). "Japanese Festival in Honor of the Birth of Children" from Sketches of Japanese Manners and Customs, by J.M.W. Silver, illustrated by native drawings, published in London in 1867

Although it is not known precisely when Tango no Sekku began to be celebrated, it was probably during the reign of the Empress Suiko (593–628 AD). In Japan, Tango no Sekku was assigned to the fifth day of the fifth month after the Nara period.

Tango no Sekku was originally a day for women to purify the house by thatching the roof with irises, which were believed to be effective in repelling evil spirits, and for women to rest their bodies, but it was changed to a day for boys in the Kamakura period (1185–1333) when the samurai class took control of the government. The reason for this was that the calamus was a plant that represented the samurai because its leaves were shaped like the blade of a Japanese sword, and the word shōbu (尚武), which means 'to value military affairs', had the same pronunciation as calamus (菖蒲) and was therefore considered an auspicious plant for the samurai. Since this period, yabusame (Japanese horseback archery) was held on May 5 as a way to ward off evil spirits.

The custom of displaying miniature Japanese armor and kabuto (helmets) on Children's Day, called Gogatsu Ningyo (May doll), has its origins in the Kamakura to Muromachi periods (1333–1573). Samurai used to take their armor, kabuto, and Japanese swords out of their storage boxes in May before the rainy season to take care of them. Since this was the time of the Tango no Sekku, they began to display armor, kabuto, and Japanese swords in the hope of protecting their children.

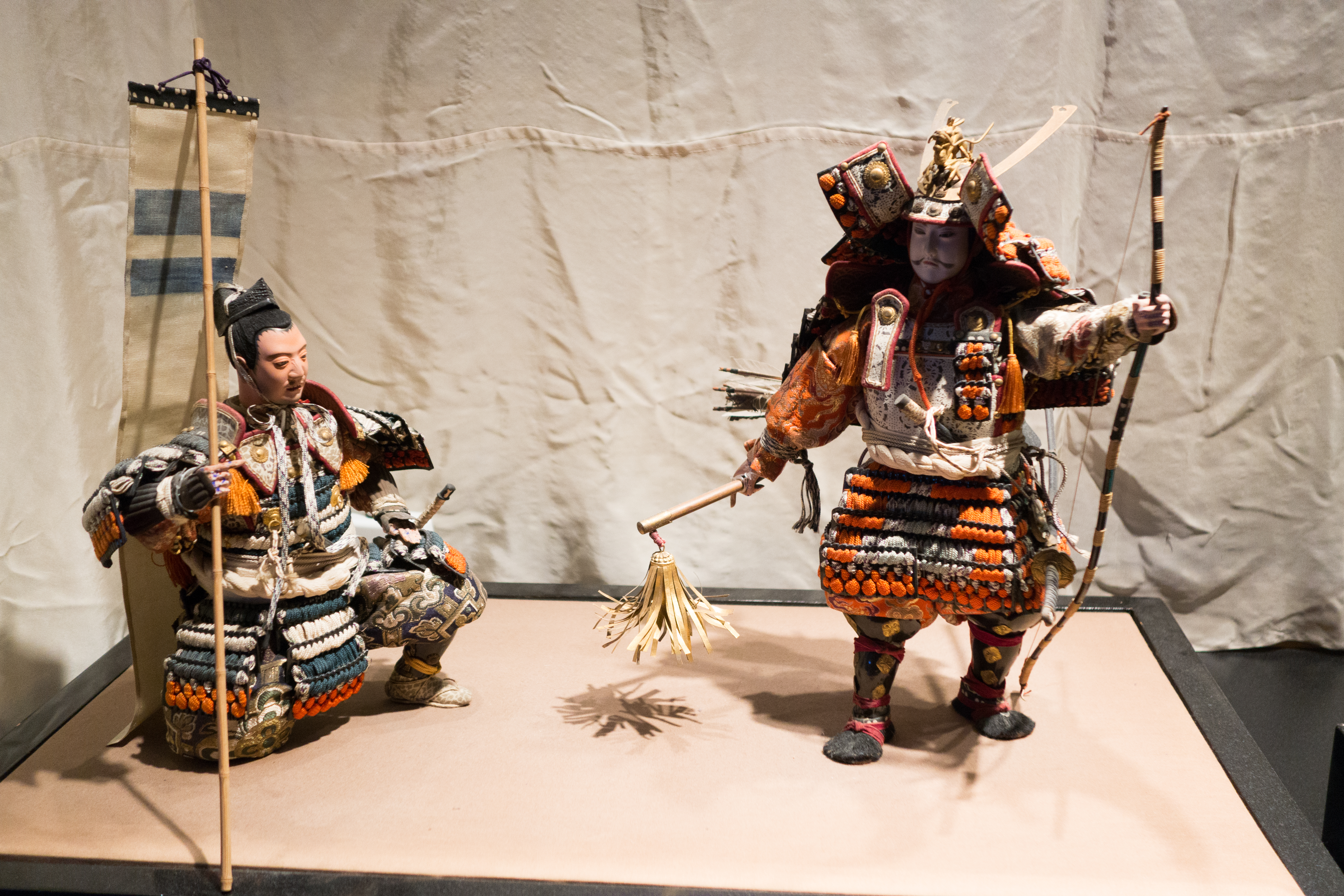
Two samurai dolls (武者人形, musha ningyo)

During the Edo period (1603–1867), Tango no Sekku celebrations became extravagant, and samurai households began to display samurai dolls (武者人形, musha ningyo) in addition to real armor, kabuto, and Japanese swords. Ordinary households began to display paper kabuto. The custom of bathing in the bathtub with irises on May 5 began in this period.

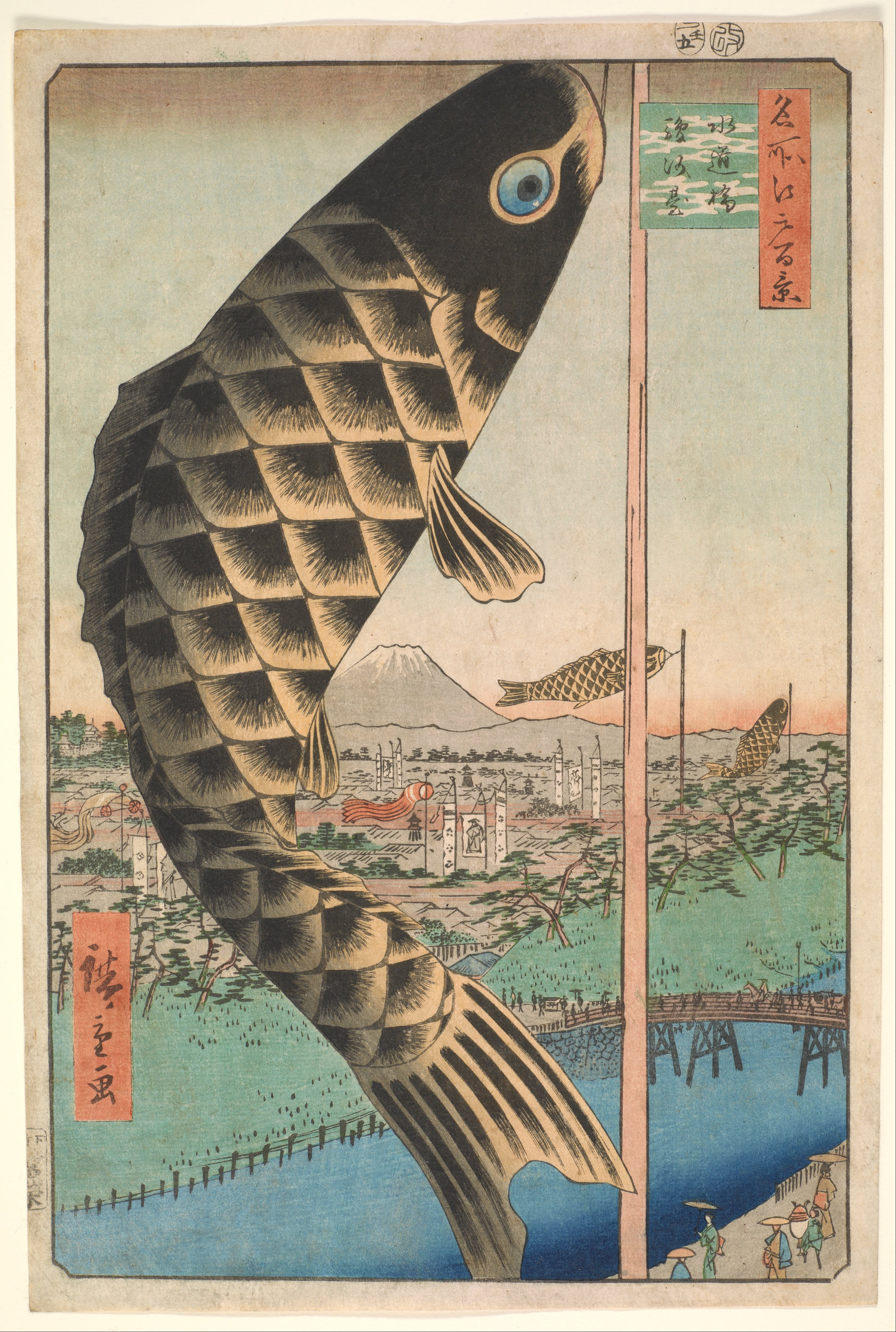
Ukiyo-e by Utagawa Hiroshige depicting koinobori. Edo period

The custom of decorating koinobori (carp streamers) on Children's Day originated in the Edo period. During the Edo period (1603–1867), samurai families began to decorate their yards with nobori or fukinuke (吹貫) flags, which were colored with mon (family crests) to represent military units, during Tango no Sekku. The nobori and fukinuke were then merged, and the first koinobori appeared in Edo (now Tokyo). The colorful koinobori as they are modernly known became popular in the Meiji era (1868–1912).

After Japan switched to the Gregorian calendar, the date was moved to May 5 of the new calendar year. Until 1948, Children's Day was known as Boys' Day (also known as Feast of Banners), celebrating boys and recognizing fathers, as the counterpart to Hinamatsuri, or "Girl's Day" on March 3. In 1948, the name was changed to Children's Day to include both male and female children, as well as recognizing mothers along with fathers and family qualities of unity.

In the Showa era (1926–1989), the popularity shifted from samurai dolls to miniature armor, and since the 21st century, miniature kabuto have become popular, probably due to the size of Japanese houses.

Kashiwa mochi (sticky rice cakes filled with red bean jam and wrapped in oak leaves) and chimaki (sticky sweet rice wrapped in an iris or bamboo leaf) are traditionally served on this day. The oak leaf used for kashiwa mochi is said to be a tree whose old leaves do not fall off until new leaves appear, and is considered a good-luck charm representing prosperity of offspring.

Since irises are believed to have medicinal properties and to ward off evil, they are used for various purposes on Tango no Sekku. For example, people would take a bath with irises in the bathtub, soak thinly sliced iris roots or leaves in sake and drink it, or put irises in thin washi (Japanese traditional paper) before putting it in their pillows and going to bed.

== See also ==
- Aging of Japan
- Golden Week
- International Day of the Boy Child
