= Gosekku =

Five annual ceremonies of the Japanese imperial court

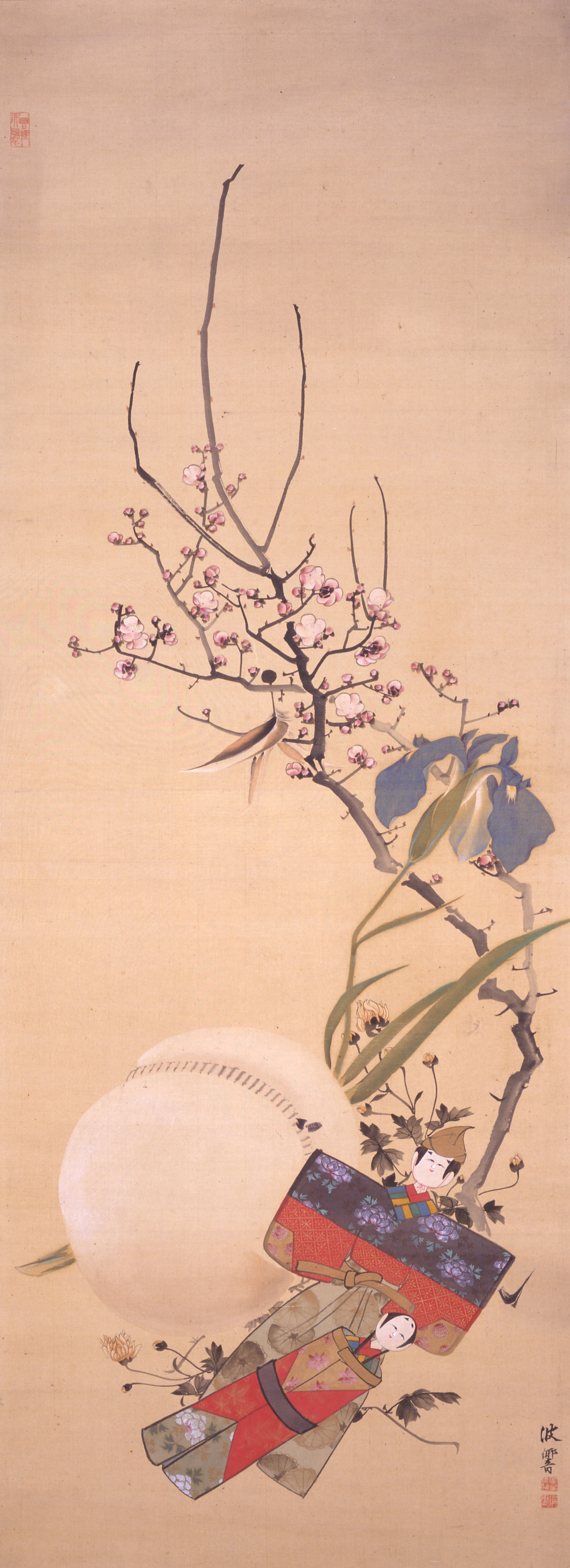
Gosekku-zu by Kakizaki Hakyō, with hagoita for the first month, peach blossoms for the third, irises for the fifth, the two lovers for the seventh, and chrysanthemum motifs for the ninth; from the collection of Hakodate City Museum

The Gosekku (五節句), also known as sekku (節句), are the five annual ceremonies that were traditionally held at the Japanese imperial court. The origins were Japanese practices merged with Chinese practices and celebrated in Japan since the Nara period in the 8th century CE. The Japanese culture and tradition incorporated this in a unique way that spread throughout the country. The festivals were held until the beginning of the Meiji era. Some of them are still celebrated by the public today.

- Kochōhai: on New Year's, the nobles processed before the emperor during the Jinjitsu celebrations.
- Kyokusui: on the third day of the third lunar month, courtiers floated rice wine down a stream in the palace garden. Each guest would take a sip and then write a poem. The Hinamatsuri festival continues today.
- Ayame no hi: on the fifth day of the fifth month, mugwort was hung to dispel evil spirits. Celebrated as the Japanese iris (ayame) festival at court, today it is known as Tango no sekku.
- Kikkoden: on the seventh day of the seventh month, offerings were made during the Tanabata festival, which celebrated the annual crossing of the Weaver (Vega) and Cowherd (Altair) constellations.
- Chōyō no en: on the ninth day of the ninth month, a celebration was held that originally featured chrysanthemum wine, but later became associated with the autumn rice harvest. It is today known as the Kiku no sekku.

The artist Ikeda Koson (1801-1866) painted five hanging scrolls in around 1830, which depict the festivals.
