= Wuyue (month) =

Fifth month of the Chinese calendar

Wǔyuè

Chinese name
- Chinese: 五月
- Hanyu Pinyin: Wǔyuè
Transcriptions
Standard Mandarin
- Hanyu Pinyin: Wǔyuè

Korean name
- Hangul: 오월
- Hanja: 五月
Transcriptions
- Revised Romanization: Owol

Traditional Korean name
- Hangul: 말달
- Hanja: 午月
Transcriptions
- Revised Romanization: Maldal

Japanese name
- Kanji: 五月
- Kana: ごがつ
Transcriptions
- Romanization: Gogatsu

Traditional Japanese name
- Kanji: 皐月
- Kana: さつき
Transcriptions
- Romanization: Satsuki

Wǔyuè (Chinese: 五月) is the fifth month of the Chinese calendar and calendars based on it, such as the Japanese calendar, Korean calendar and Vietnamese calendar. It follows Sìyuè and precedes Liùyuè. It is known in Japanese as Gogatsu (Japanese: 五月) or traditionally Satsuki (Japanese: 皐月), and in Korean as Owol (Korean: 오월; Hanja: 五月) or traditionally Maldal (Korean: 말달; Hanja: 午月). All of these words can also refer to the month of May in the Gregorian calendar.

In the Tenpō calendar, the last official version of the Japanese calendar, the fifth month must always include the summer solstice.

== Names ==
In Mandarin Chinese, traditional names of the month include liúyuè (Chinese: 榴月), púyuè (Chinese: 蒲月), and zhòngxià (Chinese: 仲夏).

In Japanese, the month is known as gogatsu (Japanese: 五月). Traditional names for it include satsuki (皐月), sanaezuki (早苗月) and gogachi. It is associated with early summer rains (Japanese: 五月雨, romanized: samidare).

== Observances ==
- The Dragon Boat Festival, also called Duanwu, is held on the 5th day of the 5th month.
- Tango no sekku was traditionally held on the 5th day of the 5th month in Japan.
- Dano is celebrated on the 5th day of the 5th month in Korea.

== Dates ==
Below is a list of the start and end dates of Wǔyuè in the Gregorian calendar. Because the 1-hour difference between China and Japan/Korea occasionally affects the date on which a new moon occurs, the dates below can differ from those of the Japanese and Korean calendars.

Dates of Wǔyuè
Year	First day	Last day
2016	5 June	3 July
2017	26 May	23 June
2018	14 June	12 July
2019	3 June	2 July
2020	21 June	20 July
2021	10 June	9 July
2022	30 May	28 June
2023	18 June	17 July
2024	6 June	5 July
2025	27 May	24 June
2026	15 June	13 July
2027	5 June	3 July
2028	24 May	22 June
2028 (leap)	23 June	21 July
2029	12 June	10 July
2030	1 June	30 June
2031	20 June	18 July
2032	8 June	6 July
2033	28 May	26 June
2034	16 June	15 July
2035	6 June	4 July
2036	26 May	23 June
