= Kashiwa mochi =

Japanese confection

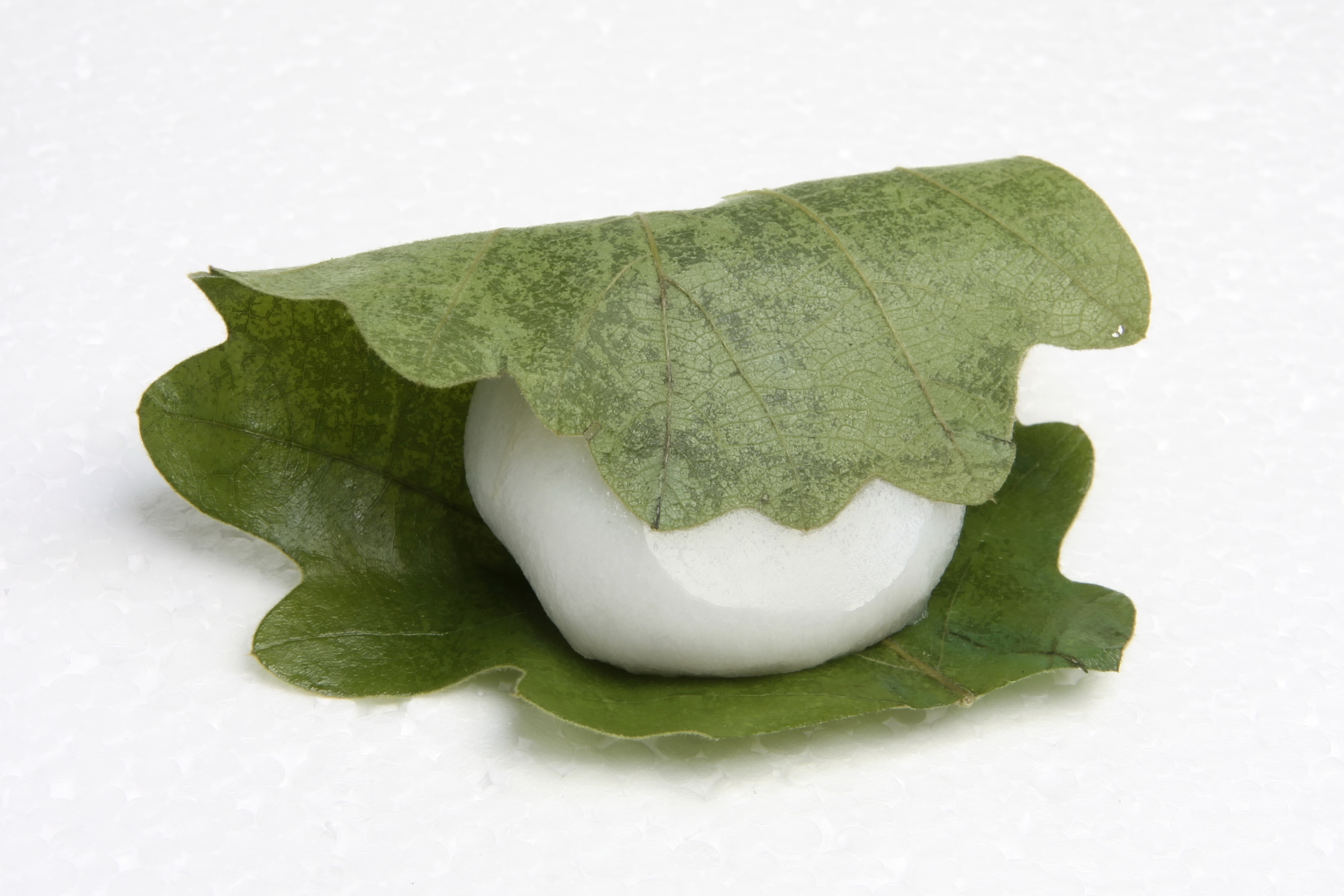
Kashiwa mochi

Kashiwa mochi (Japanese: かしわ餅, 柏餅) is a wagashi (Japanese confection) of white mochi surrounding a sweet anko (red bean paste) filling with a kashiwa (oak) leaf wrapped around it. Unlike the cherry blossom leaf used in sakura mochi, the oak (kashiwa) leaf used in kashiwa mochi is not eaten and used only to symbolize the prosperity of one's descendants.

== Children's Day ==
Tango no sekku (Children's Day) is celebrated in Japan on May 5. On this day, the Japanese promote the happiness and well-being of children. Kashiwa-mochi and chimaki are made especially for this celebration.

== See also ==
- Mochi
- Japanese rice
- Sakuramochi
