= Japanese dolls =

Type of doll

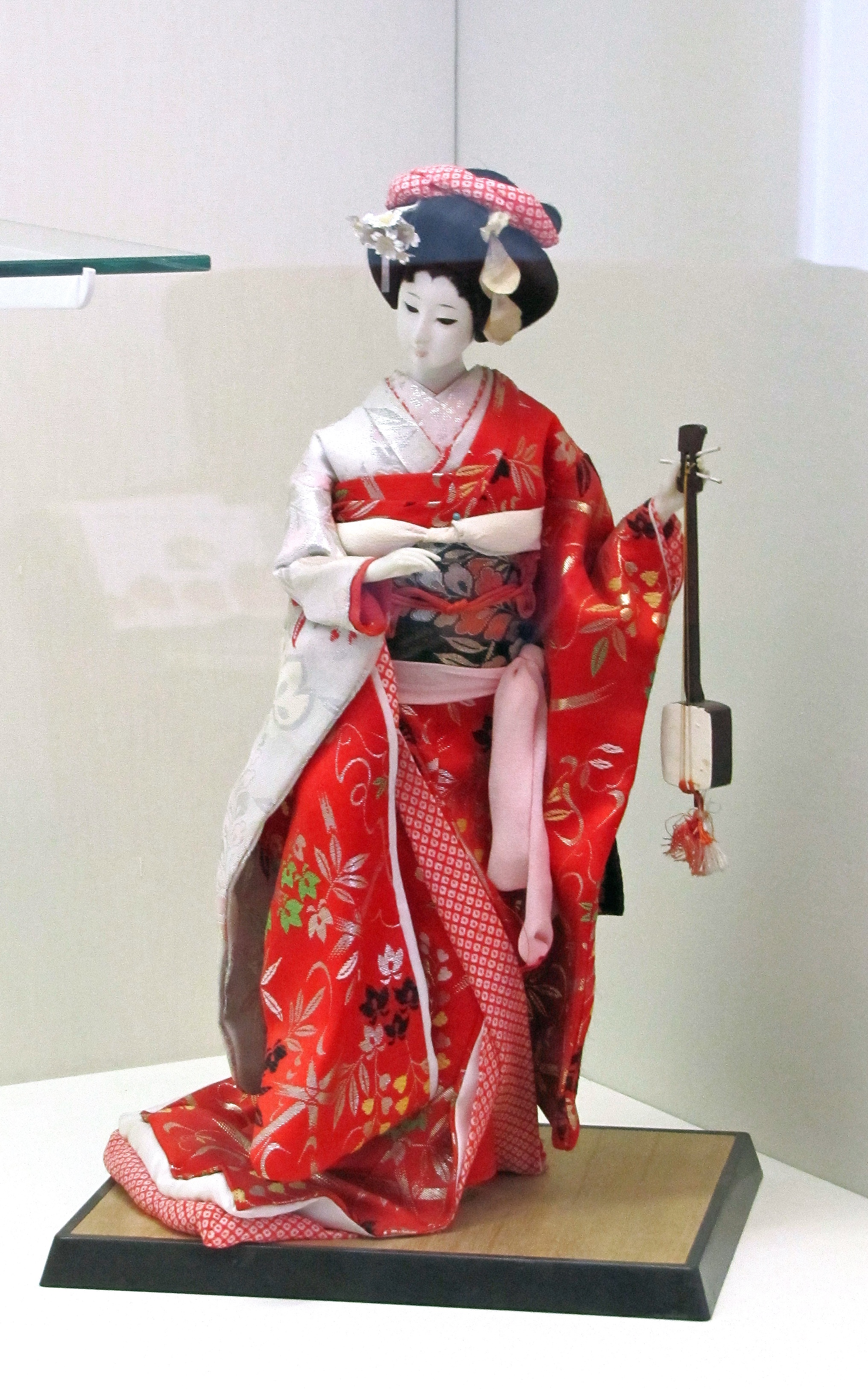
Japanese Oyama doll in traditional kimono and musical instrument

Japanese dolls (人形, ningyō; lit. 'human form') are one of the traditional Japanese crafts. There are various types of traditional dolls, some representing children and babies, some the imperial court, warriors and heroes, fairy-tale characters, gods and (rarely) demons, and also people of the daily life of Japanese cities. Many have a long tradition and are still made today for household shrines, formal gift-giving, or for festival celebrations such as Hinamatsuri, the doll festival, or Kodomo no Hi, Children's Day. Some are manufactured as a local craft, to be purchased by pilgrims as a souvenir of a temple visit or some other trip.

== History ==
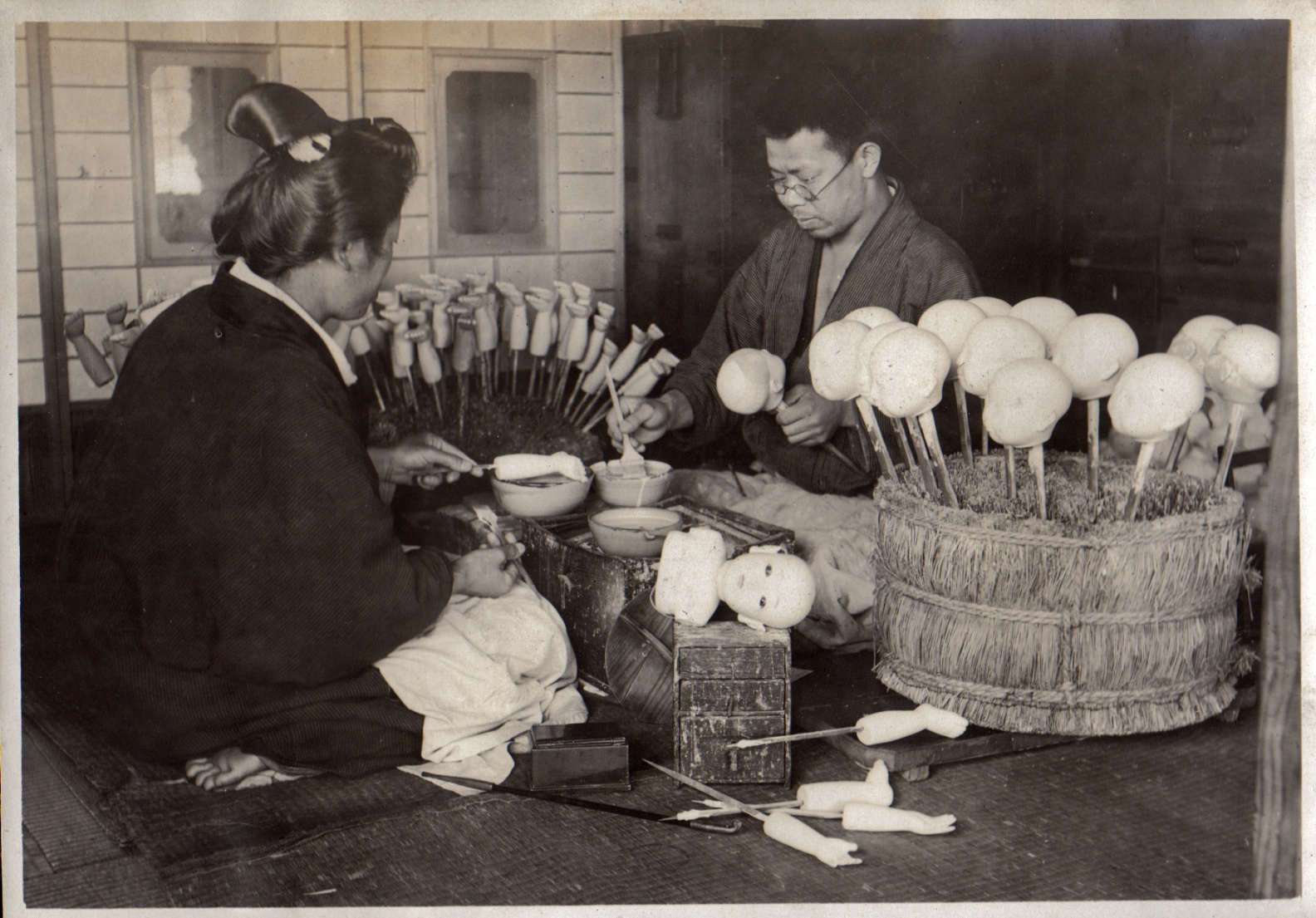
Doll makers, 1915

There may be a continuity in the making of the dogū (土偶), humanoid figures, by the ancient Jōmon culture in Japan (8000–200 BC), which were associated with fertility or shamanistic rites, at a time when dolls were thought to have souls. Dolls also have continuity from the Haniwa funerary figures of the subsequent Kofun culture (around 300–600 AD). Expert Alan Pate notes that temple records refer to the making of a grass doll to be blessed and thrown into the river at Ise Shrine in 3 BC; the custom was probably even more ancient, but it is at the root of the modern doll festival, or Hinamatsuri.

In the early 11th century, around the peak of the Heian period, several types of dolls had already been defined, as known from Lady Murasaki's novel The Tale of Genji. Girls played with dolls and doll houses; women made protective dolls for their children or grandchildren; dolls were used in religious ceremonies, taking on the sins of a person whom they had touched. At that time, it was thought that evil could be ritualistically transferred to a paper image called a katashiro (形代), which were then cast to the river or sea; Japanese dolls today may be the result of the combination of katashiro and paper dolls children once played with. Hōko, though not explicitly mentioned in The Tale of Genji, were soft-bodied dolls given to young women of age and especially to pregnant women to protect both mother and unborn child. Sources mentioning them by name start appearing in the Heian period, but are more apparent in the Muromachi period.

Okiagari-koboshi are roly-poly toys made from papier-mâché, dating back to at least the 14th century. They are good-luck charms and symbols of perseverance and resilience.

Probably the first professional dollmakers were temple sculptors, who used their skill to make painted wooden images of children (Saga dolls). The possibilities of this art form, using carved wood or wood composition, a shining white "skin" lacquer called gofun made from ground oystershell and glue, and textiles, were vast.

During the Edo period (1603–1867), when Japan was closed to most trade, there developed both fine dollmakers and a market of wealthy individuals who would pay for the most beautiful doll sets for display in their homes or as valuable gifts. Sets of dolls came to include larger and more elaborate figures, and more of them. The competitive trade was eventually regulated by government, meaning that doll makers could be arrested or banished for breaking laws on materials and height.

== Annual doll festival ==
Homes and shops put up traditionally-clothed dolls of various sizes, set on a red dais, around 3 March for the festival of Hinamatsuri. These feature the emperor and empress, attended by a court retinue: warriors, ministers and so on. Full versions include 15 dolls and apparatus such as utensils for Japanese tea ceremony (茶の湯, cha no yu). The most elaborate sets can fetch many millions of yen (tens of thousands of US$). The Doll Festival is celebrated to ensure girls' future happiness, and this link to daughters is rooted in the use of dolls in children's play. However, the Doll Festival itself has been part of Japanese culture only since the Edo period.

== Types ==
It was during the Edo period that most of the traditional doll types known today developed.

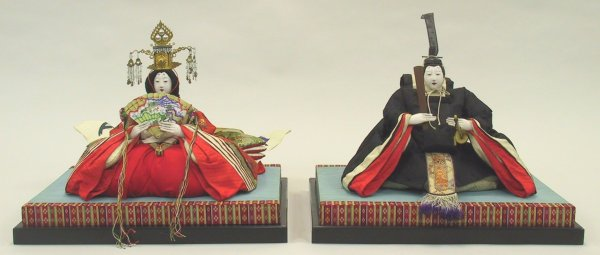
Hinamatsuri dolls of the emperor and empress

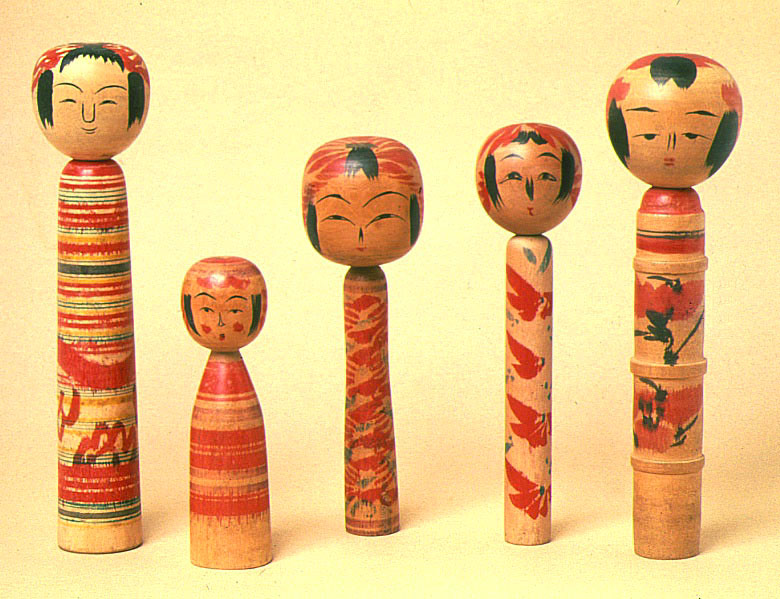
Wooden kokeshi dolls

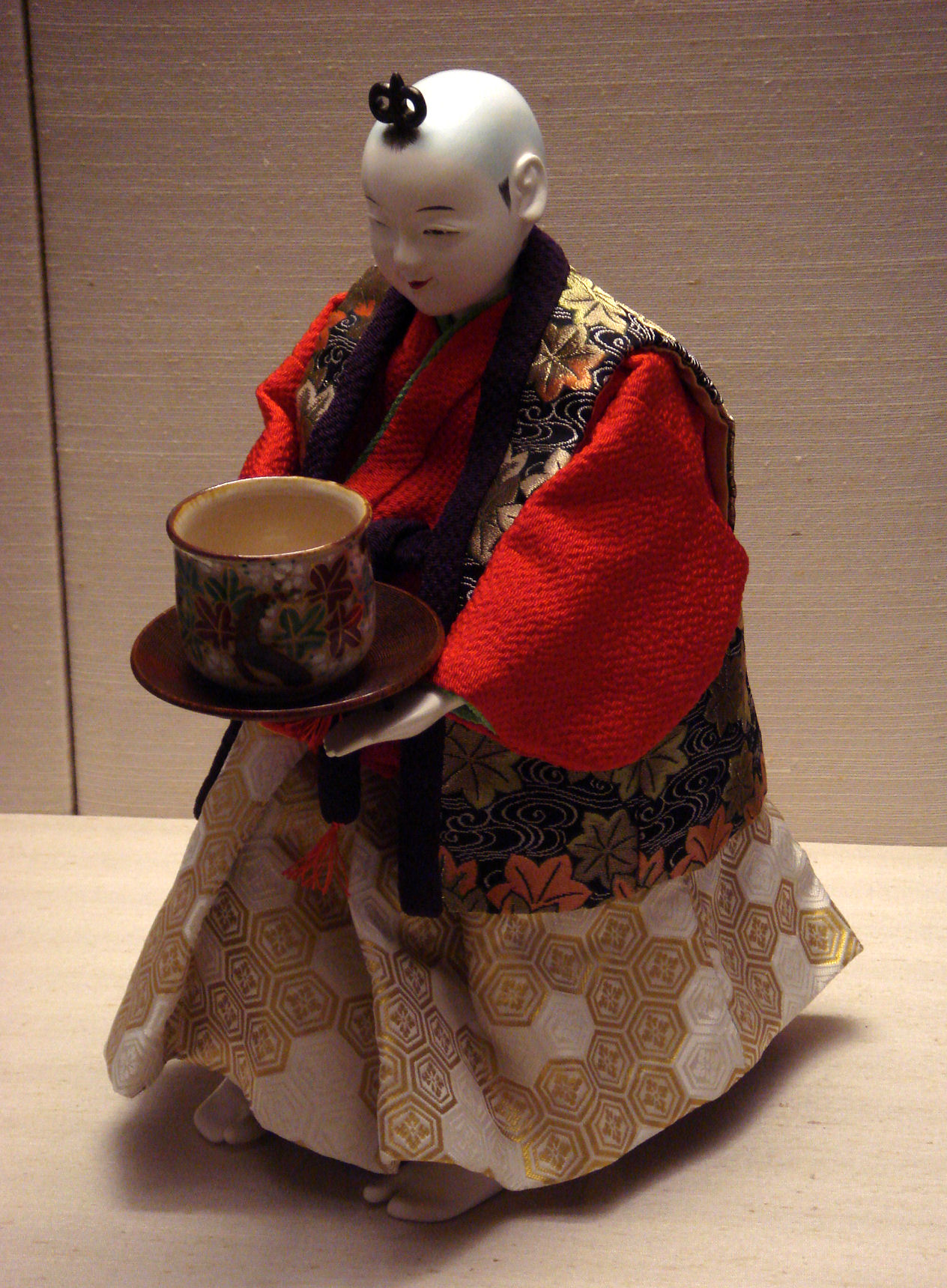
Mechanical karakuri ningyō for bringing tea

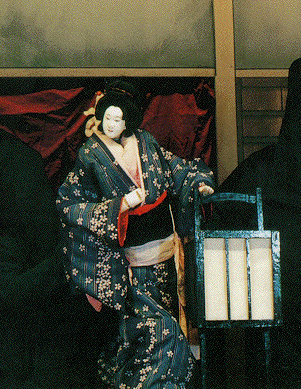
Bunraku puppet during a play

- Hina dolls are the dolls for Hinamatsuri, the doll festival on March 3. They can be made of many materials, but the classic hina doll has a pyramidal body of elaborate, many-layered textiles stuffed with straw and/or wood blocks, carved wood hands (and in some cases feet) covered with gofun, and a head of carved wood or composite molded wood covered with gofun, with set-in glass eyes (though before about 1850, the eyes were carved into the gofun and painted), and human or silk hair. A full set comprises at least 15 dolls, representing specific characters, with many accessories (dogū), though the basic set is a male-female pair, often referred to as the Emperor and Empress.
- Kintarō dolls are offered to Japanese children during the Tango no Sekku holiday, in order to inspire in them the bravery and strength of the legendary Kintarō.
- Musha, or warrior dolls, are usually made of materials similar to the hina dolls, but the construction is often more complicated, since the dolls represent men (or women) seated on camp chairs, standing, or riding horses. Armor, helmets, and weapons are made of lacquered paper, often with metal accents. There is no specified "set" of such dolls; subjects include Emperor Jimmu, Empress Jingū with her prime minister Takenouchi holding her newborn imperial son, Shoki the Demon-Queller, Toyotomi Hideyoshi and his generals and tea-master, and fairy-tale figures such as Momotarō the Peach Boy or Kintarō the Golden Boy.
- Gosho dolls show fat, cute babies in a simplified form. The basic gosho is an almost-naked sitting boy, carved all in one piece, with very white skin, though gosho with elaborate clothing, hairstyle, and accessories, female as well as male, became popular as well. They developed as a gifts associated with the Imperial court, and gosho could be translated "palace" or "court".
- Kimekomi dolls (木目込人形) are made of wood. The ancestors of kimekomi dolls are kamo ("willow-wood") dolls, small dolls carved of willow and decorated with cloth scraps. Kimekomi refers to a method of making dolls. They start with a carved and/or molded base of wood, wood composite, or (in some modern dolls) plastic foam. A design of different patterned cloth scraps is planned out, and the base is grooved so that the edges of the cloth can be hidden in the grooves. The cloth is glued on and the edges tucked in. The head and hands (if any) of the doll are usually finished with gofun; the hair may be part of the molded head or be a separate wig. These dolls have become a very popular craft and kits with finished heads can be purchased. The method is also used by some of Japan's avant-garde dollmakers, who adapt the old materials to new visions.
- Karakuri ningyō, puppets or dolls are mechanical; they include the large figures on festival floats, for festivals like Kyoto's Gion Matsuri and smaller entertaining scenes, often with a musical element accompanying the movement. They often depict legendary heroes.
- Bunraku is a form of theatrical puppet theatre which rivalled and inspired the kabuki theater, and survives today.
- Kokeshi dolls have been made for 150 years, and are from Northern Honshū, the main island of Japan. They were originally made as toys for children of farmers. They have no arms or legs, but a large head and cylindrical body, representing little girls. From a simple toy, it has now become a famous Japanese craft, and now an established souvenir for tourists.
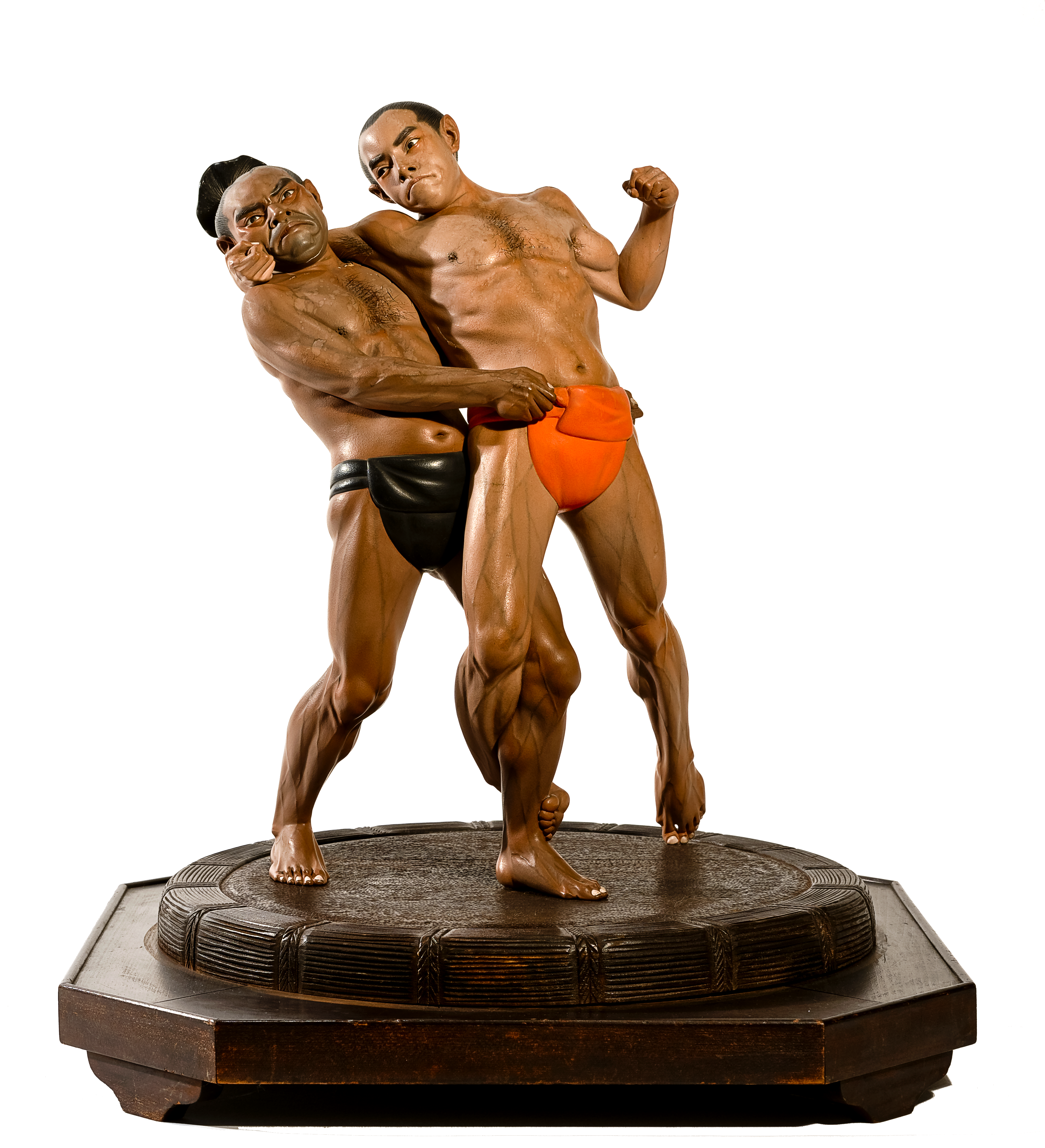
- Japanese figure group entitled 'The Wrestlers' or 'Kawatso Saburo Overcoming Matano Goro'. The sculpture depicts Kawatso Saburo wrestling with Matano Goro during a famous sumo match of AD 1176. The pair are shown in the hold 'kawazu-gake' named after Saburo, the victor. This item is possibly a miniature example of Iki-ningyō (living dolls), the Japanese tradition of making life-sized life-like dolls which were popular in misemono (exhibitions) during the Edo period of Japan and showed dramatic historical scenes.
  Iki-ningyō are life-sized lifelike dolls, that were popular in misemono shows. Artists made iki-ningyō that were novel not just for their subjects that shocked viewers—figures lying in pools of their own blood, for example—but for their influence on Japanese dolls. The works of Matsumoto Kisaburō and Yasumoto Kamehachi, in particular, contributed to form an extreme sense of realism.
- Ichimatsu dolls (市松人形) represent little girls or boys, correctly proportioned and usually with flesh-colored skin and glass eyes. The original ichimatsu were named after an 18th-century kabuki actor, and must have represented an adult man, but since the late 19th century the term has applied to child dolls, usually made to hold in the arms, dress, and pose (either with elaborately made joints or with floppy cloth upper arms and thighs). Baby boy dolls with mischievous expressions were most popular in the late 19th and early 20th century, but in 1927 the friendship doll exchange involved the creation of 58 32 in (810 mm) dolls representing little girls, to be sent as a gift from Japan to the United States, and the aesthetic of these dolls influenced dollmakers to emulate this type of a solemn, gentle-looking little girl in elaborate kimono.
- Daruma are spherical dolls with red bodies and white faces without pupils. They represent Bodhidharma, an East Indian who founded Zen about 1500 years ago; according to legend, he removed his own eyelids to prevent sleep from breaking his concentration, and his limbs withered after prolonged meditation. Daruma dolls are charms to bring good fortune, continued prosperity, and fortitude to accomplish goals. Usually daruma dolls are purchased with blank eyes. One eye is filled when making a wish, the other when the wish is fulfilled. Wishes can be made throughout the year, but it is common in Japan to do it on New Year's Day.
- Teru teru bōzu ("shine-shine monk") are strictly speaking not a type of doll. They are handmade of white paper or cloth, and hung from a window by a string to bring good weather and prevent rain.
- Hōko dolls ("crawling child") are a soft-bodied doll given to young women of age and especially to pregnant women in Japan as a talisman to protect both mother and unborn child.
- Ningyogeki is television dramas using puppetry.

With the end of the Edo period and the advent of the modern Meiji era in the late 1800s, the art of doll-making changed as well:

- Silk-skinned or "mask-face" dolls became a popular craft in Japan in the 1920s and 1930s, allowing the individual to design elaborate kimono for dolls representing women of various periods of Japanese history, particularly the Edo period. Dolls of this type continued to be made and were a popular item for servicemen and tourists to bring back after World War II, though they also might choose dolls representing similar subjects made with gofun faces.
- Bisque dolls are made of fired clay. Fukuoka is a traditional center of the manufacture of bisque dolls, and Hakata ningyō are famous throughout Japan.
- Anesama ningyō and shiori ningyō (literally "big sister dolls" and "bookmark dolls," respectively) are made of washi paper. Anesama ningyō tend to be three-dimensional, whereas shiori ningyō are flat. Anesama ningyō often have elaborate hairstyles and costumes made of high-quality washi paper. They often lack facial features. Those from Shimane Prefecture are especially famous.
  - A hybrid of anesama ningyō and shiori ningyō, called shikishi ningyō, has become popular in recent years. Shikishi ningyō are a type of Japanese paper dolls made with figures and scenes and are mounted on shikishi, a rectangular fancy cardboard about a square foot (about a tenth of a square meter) in size.
- More recent and less traditional Japanese dolls are ball-jointed dolls (BJDs), whose growth in popularity has spread to the US and other countries since the advent of the Super Dollfie, first made by Volks in 1999. BJDs can be very realistic-looking or based more on the anime aesthetic. They are made of polyurethane resin which makes them very durable. These dolls are highly customizable in that owners can sand them, change out their wig and eye colors, and even change their face paint. Because of this hands-on aspect of customization, they are not only popular with collectors, but also with hobbyists.

== Collectors ==
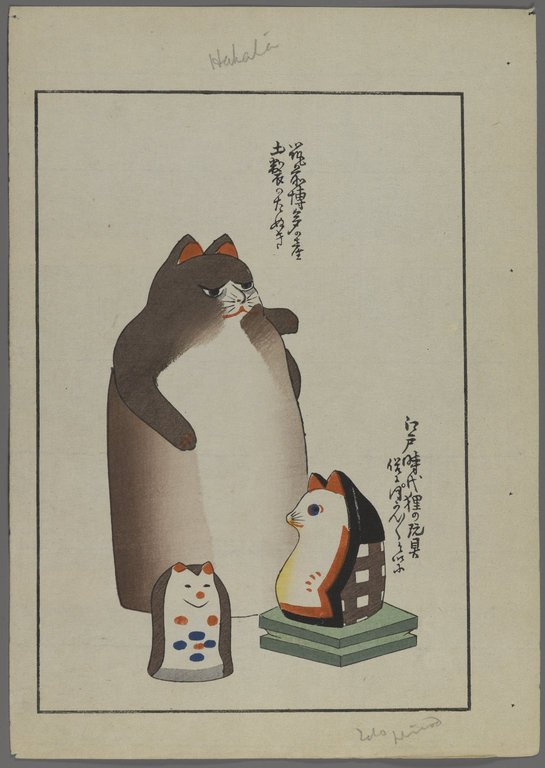
Animal dolls, illustrated by Shimizu Seifū from his collection (1893–1923)

Japanese dolls are broken down into several subcategories. Two of the most prominent are Girl's Day, hina-ningyō, and the Boy's Day musha-ningyō, or display dolls, sagu-ningyō, gosho-ningyō, and isho-ningyō. Collections can be categorized by the material they are made of such as wood dolls (kamo-ningyō and nara-ningyō) and clay forms such as fushimi ningyō, koga ningyō, and hakata ningyō.

In the 19th century, ningyō were introduced to the West. Doll collecting has since become a popular pastime in the West. Famous well known collectors from the West include individuals such as James Tissot (1836–1902), Jules Adeline (1845–1909), Eloise Thomas (1907–1982), and Samuel Pryor (1898–1985). James Tissot was known to be a religious history painter. In 1862, after attending a London Exhibition, he was drawn to Japanese art. During the 1860s, Tissot was known as one of the most important collectors of Japanese art in Paris. His collections included kosode-style kimono, paintings, bronze, ceramics, screens and a number of bijin-ningyō (dolls from the late Edo period). Adeline was known as a working artist and he is also known as "Mikika". Adeline produced many works throughout his career as a working artist. He is best known for his etchings and received the Cross of the Legion of Honor for his Vieux-Roven "Le Parvis Notre-Dame". Unlike Tissot, Adeline is recognized as a true collector. A majority of Adeline's collection consisted of ningyō, and only a few prints.

During the Meiji period, three men became pioneers in collecting ningyō: Shimizu Seifū (1851–1913), Nishizawa Senko (1864–1914), and Tsuboi Shōgorō (1863–1913). The three men are referred to as Gangu San Ketsu ("the three great toy collectors"). They introduced a systematic approach to collecting ningyō in an effort to preserve and document the various forms of ningyō. Shimizu, an artist and calligrapher, put his artistic ability to use by creating an illustrated catalog of his own collection of 440 ningyō dolls. The catalog was published in 1891, under the title Unai no Tomo. Nishizawa, a banker, gathered a significant collection on hina-ningyō. He was an active researcher, collector of stories, documents, and information relating to the development of hina-ningyō during the Edo period. Nishizawa's son Tekiho (1889–1965) inherited his collection, but a great portion of the collection was lost in the Kanto earthquake of 1923. Tsuboi, founder of the Tokyo Anthropological Society, was the most trained of the three, and he brought a scientific element to the collecting of ningyō.

Dolls have been a part of Japanese culture for many years, and the phenomenon of collecting them is still practiced. Many collections are preserved in museums, including the Peabody Essex Museum, Kyoto National Museum, and the Yodoko Guest House.

== See also ==
- Hinamatsuri
- Japanese craft
- Meibutsu
