= Ushi no toki mairi =

Traditional Japanese method of laying a curse

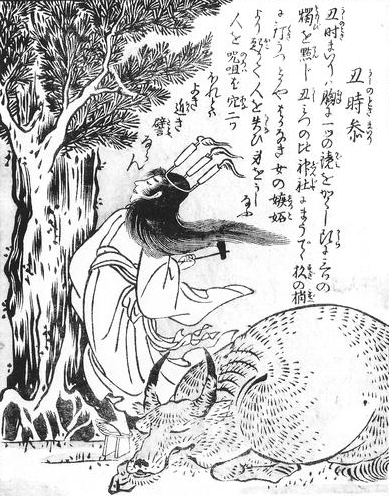
Ushi no toki mairi from the Konjaku Gazu Zoku Hyakki (1779) by Sekien Toriyama

Ushi no toki mairi (Japanese: 丑の時参り; lit. "ox-hour shrine-visit") or ushi no koku mairi (丑の刻参り) refers to a traditional Japanese method of cursing a target, so called because it is conducted during the hours of the Ox (between 1 and 3 AM). The practitioner—typically a scorned woman—hammers nails into the sacred tree (神木, shinboku) of a Shinto shrine while dressed in white and crowned with an iron ring laden by three upright candles. In the common modern-day depiction, the nails are driven through a straw effigy (Note: straw doll (藁人形, wara ningyō)) of the victim, impaling the doll upon the tree. The ritual must be repeated seven days in a row, after which the curse is believed to succeed, causing death to the target. However, being witnessed in the act is thought to nullify the spell. The Kifune Shrine in Kyoto is famously associated with this ritual.

Also variously called ushi no toki mōde (丑の時詣で), ushi mairi (丑参り), or ushimitsu mairi (丑三参り).

== Overview ==
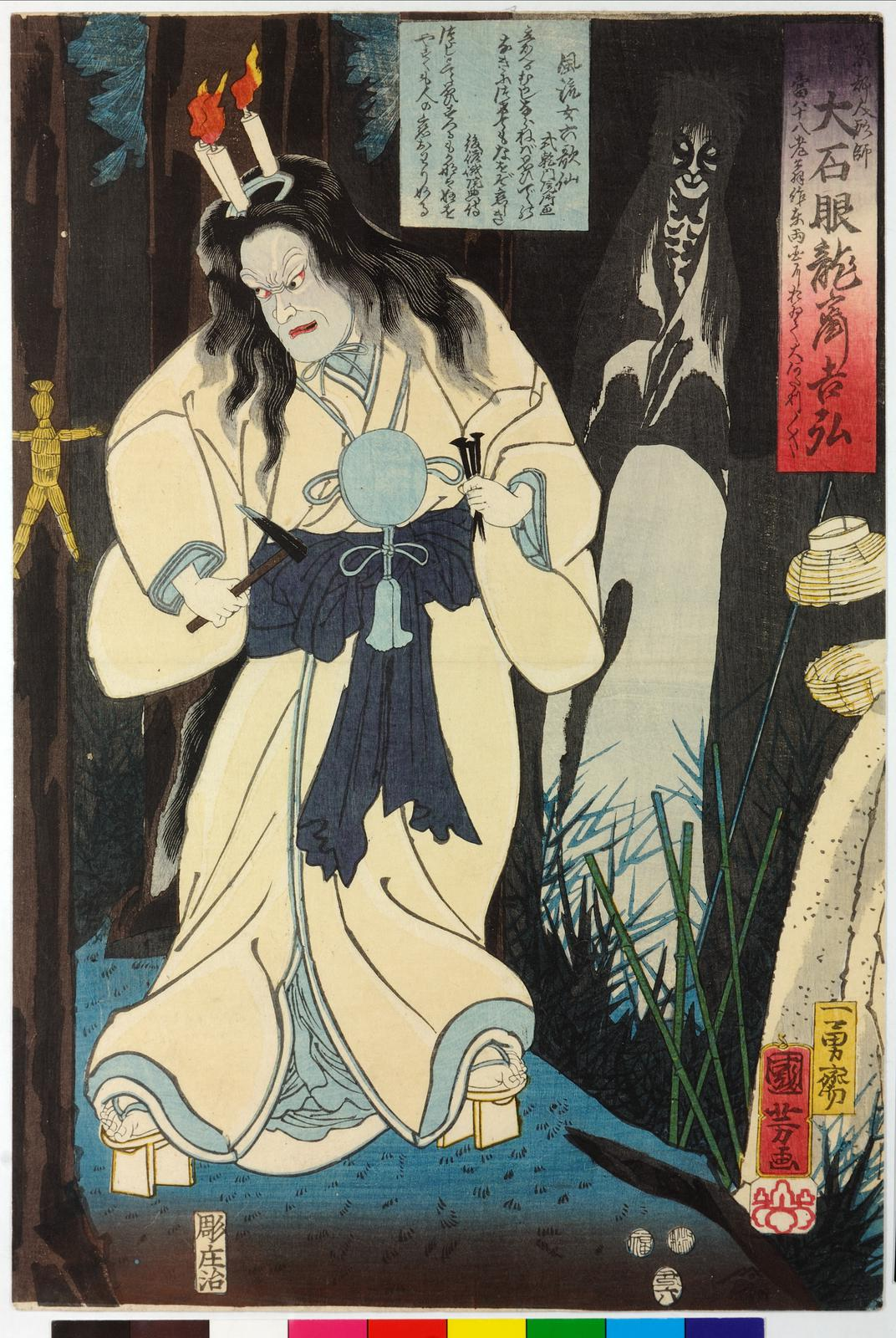
Kuniyoshi print, Kaei 6 (1853). "Kyoto doll-maker Ōishi Ganryūsai Yoshihiro", one of the six immortal poetesses series. (Note: This same year, Ganryūsai created the life-size mitate iki dolls of Six Immortal Poets, exhibited in Ryōgoku, Edo, (thus this ukiyo-e art is a spoof of this), and is clearly a (mitate of) the Ushi no toki mairi.)

Common methods of portraying this ritual developed during the Edo period (1603–1868 CE).

The woman performing the curse is generally depicted as dressed in white, with disheveled hair, wearing an iron "crown" that holds three burning candles. She hangs a mirror around her neck (which is hidden in her clothing) and wears a pair of tall clogs (geta). (Note: Mitsuhashi 2011, pp. 264–265 states that she wears tall clogs with only one support board (「一本歯の高下駄」), even though the accompanying illustration from a Utagawa Toyohiro print clearly shows two supports.) She nails a straw doll (cf. image left) representing her target to a sacred tree (神木, shimboku) at the Shinto shrine.

The iron "crown" that she wears is actually a tripod (五徳, gotoku) or trivet, a stand for setting cookware above a heat source, which she wears inverted, slipping the iron ring over her head and sticking candles on its three legs.

It was believed that the spot struck on the straw doll would correspond to the area of the body where the target would soon experience illness or injury. However, this straw doll or other form of effigy was not always depicted in the ritual even relatively late in the Edo Period. For instance, Toriyama Sekien's Konjaku Gazu Zoku Hyakki (1779, pictured top right) shows the woman holding a hammer but no doll, nor is the doll mentioned in the caption. In that illustration, the nails are driven directly into the branches of the sacred tree.

The props are described somewhat differently, depending on the source. Nails of a particular size called gosun kugi (五寸釘; "five inch nails") are required according to some authorities. The practitioner may hold a comb in her mouth or a "torch of bamboo and pine roots lighted at both ends." The "proper witching hour" is, strictly speaking, the ushi no mitsu doki (2:00–2:30 am).

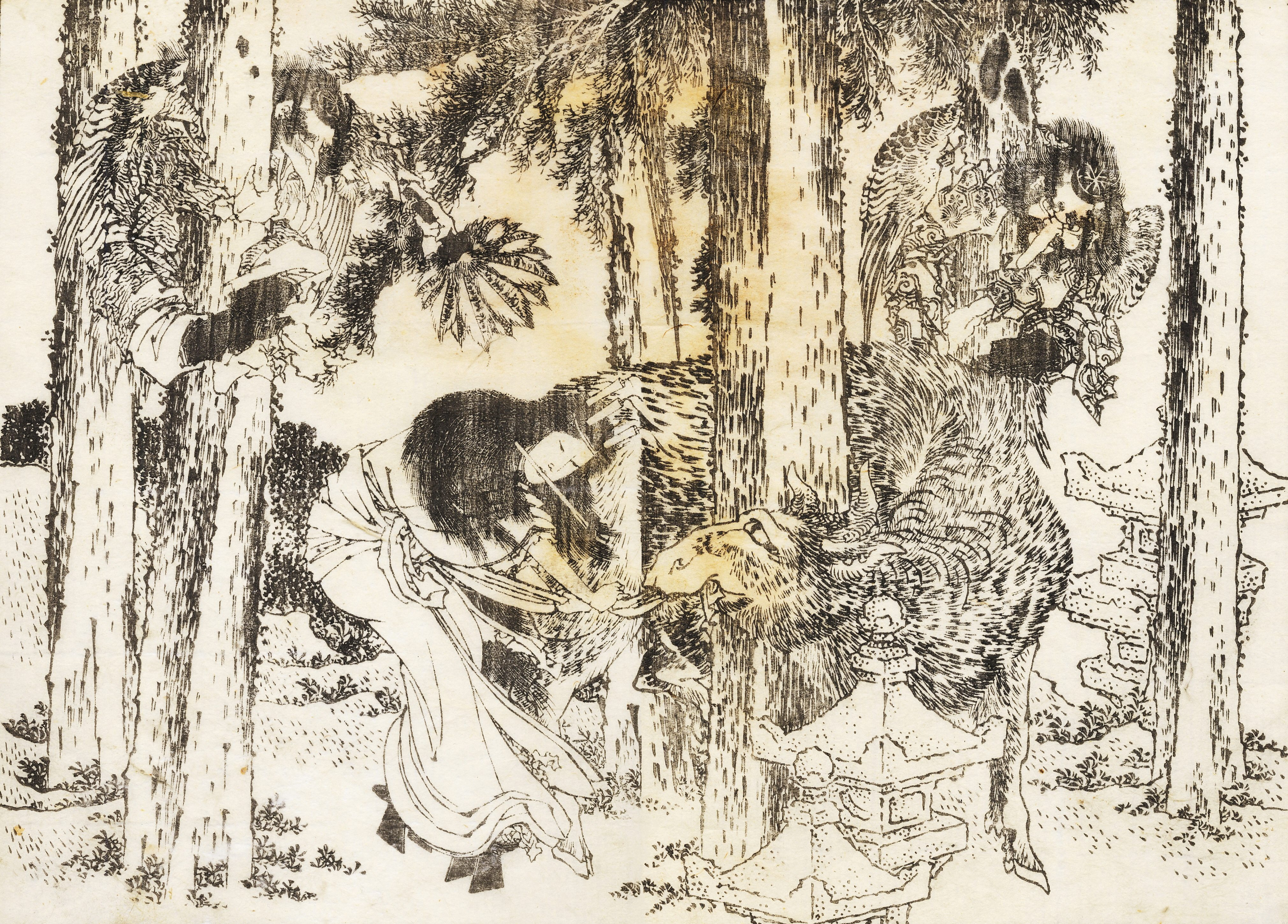
A woman summoning a yōkai through ushi no toki mairi, by Katsushika Hokusai

In Sekien's or Hokusai's print (above), the woman performing the curse ritual is depicted with a black ox by her side. Such a creature is expected to appear on the seventh night of the ritual, and one must stride over or straddle the animal to complete the curse, but if a practitioner betrays their fear of the ox, the "potency of the charm is lost."

== History ==
The term once only referred to worshipping at a shrine during the hours of the ox, and the curse connotation developed later. At the Kifune Shrine in Kyoto, it was said that if one prayed here at the "ox hour of the ox day of the ox month of the ox year" their wish was likely to be granted, because it was during this exact moment that the Kifune deity was believed to descend upon the shrine. However, this shrine became known a cursing spot later on.

The Kifune Shrine became strongly associated with the ox hour curse due in part to the popular medieval legend of the Hashihime of Uji ("The Princess of the Bridge of Uji"). This legend is considered the origin of the Ushi no toki mairi curse ritual. According to the story, the mortal woman Hashihime was the daughter of a certain nobleman, but consumed by jealousy, made a wish to become a kijin (an oni demon) capable of destroying her romantic rival. After seven days at Kifune Shrine, she was finally given a revelation by the resident deity "to bathe for thirty-seven days in the rapids of the Uji River." Although Kifune has later been described as the proper site for the ritual, Hashihime only learned the technique there, and enacted it miles away (Kifune is in northern Kyoto, and the Uji River is to the south).

The earliest written text of the legend appears in a late Kamakura-period variant text (Yashirobon codex) of The Tale of Heike, in the Tsurugi no maki ("Book of the Sword") chapter. The tale claims that Hashihime was originally a mortal during the reign of Emperor Saga (809 to 823 CE), but after turning into a demon, killing her rival and her lover's kinsmen, then indiscriminately slaying other innocent parties, she lived long beyond a normal human life span. She eventually would attack the samurai Watanabe no Tsuna at the Ichijo Modoribashi (一条戻橋) "Turning Back bridge at the street crossing of Ichijō and Horikawa" only to have her arm severed by the sword Higekiri (髭切). The samurai kept the demon's arm, whose power was contained by the Yinyang master (陰陽師, onmyōji) Abe no Seimei, via chanting the Ninnō-kyō sutra. In this variant of the tale, the ceremony that Hashihime performs at the Uji River to transform into a demon is described as follows:

Secluding herself in a deserted spot, she divided her long hair into five bunches and fashioned these bunches into horns. She daubed her face with vermilion and her body with cinnabar, set on her head an iron tripod with burning brands [* (Note: or "to each of its leg, a torch made with pine wood is tied and afired" in Kusano 1962, p. 30)] attached to its legs and held in her mouth another brand, burning at both ends.

—From Tsurugi no Maki

Here, the author describes Hashihime wearing the tripod (here called kanawa (鉄輪)) and holding lit torches (similar to candles in later traditions), but her paints her entire face and body red, rather than remaining in pure white clothing.

Later, during the Muromachi period, this legend was adapted by Zeami into the Noh play Kanawa or "The Iron Crown." The Noh play inherits essentially the same outfit for Hashihime, who is commanded by an oracle to "daub [her] face with red and wear scarlet clothing." The play uses neither a straw doll nor hammer, but has the Yinyang master Seimei create "two life-size straw effigies of the man and his new wife [with] their names [placed] inside" in order to perform the rites to exorcize Hashihime's demon. It is likely that the later form of the ushi no mairi developed afterwards, through the marriage of the use of dolls in the Japanese esoteric art of onmyōdō with the shrine visiting of the ox hour.

=== Curses using dolls in antiquity ===
The use of dolls in cursing rituals has been practiced since antiquity, with a reference in the Nihon Shoki chronicle under the reign of Emperor Yōmei, which describes that in 587 CE Nakatomi no Katsumi no Muraji "prepared figures of the Imperial Prince Oshisaka no Hikohito no Ōe (押坂彦人大兄皇子) ... and [spellcast] them," but the spell did not work. However, this record does not say if the dolls were poked by sharp implements.

Archeological remains of humanoid dolls have been suspected of being used for curses. These wooden purificatory figurines (木製人形代, Mokusei hitogatashiro) often have realistically drawn ink faces, and others have iron nails driven into their torsos. One such doll from the 8th century is held by the Nara National Research Institute for Cultural Properties. Another effigy, from the Tatechō site in Matsue, Shimane, depicts a female figure dressed as a noblewoman, with three wooden nails driven into it, aimed at her breasts and heart.

== Law ==
In Japanese law studies, attempts to commit murder through the ushi no mairi is often cited as the "textbook example of impossibility defense case crime."

== In popular culture ==
- A once-common design archetype for characters interested in ghosts and the occult in anime and manga involves these characters wearing lit candles held upright against their head with a makeshift headband made of rope or another sturdy material. Perhaps the best-known to Western audiences is Hikaru Gosunkugi of Ranma ½, who is directly named after the ritual's iconic gosunkugi nails (adapted as the nickname "Voodoo Spike" in the official Viz Media translation).
- The film Kanawa (1969) is based on the Noh play.
- In the video game Final Fantasy Crystal Chronicles: The Crystal Bearers, one variety of Tonberry uses a hammer and nail to control a much larger nail that will chase after and attack the player character Layle.
- In the video game series Pokémon, there is a Ghost-type attack called Curse. When used by a Ghost-type Pokémon, the attack animation involves hammering a nail into themselves and losing 50% of their health. The opposing Pokémon is then "cursed" and loses 25% of their health every turn regardless of if the Pokémon that used the move faints.
- The character Kain Hikaru from the manga Fairy Tail uses this technique as his magic.
- The character Nobara Kugisaki from the manga Jujutsu Kaisen is skilled in combat using a straw doll, a hammer and nails which she learned from her grandmother.
- The character Soichi Tsujii from the manga Junji Ito Collection used this way to curse people.
- The Curse Devil from the manga Chainsaw Man can be summoned through the use of nails or something that resembles them (i.e. a spike-like sword); after its victim is "nailed" three times, the devil will appear and finish them off.

== See also ==
- ara-mitama and nigi-mitama
- goryō – Vengeful Japanese ghosts
- Jikininki – Short story by Lafcadio Hearn
- Lucia - Swedish Christmas character enacted by woman wearing candles on head
- Rinki no hi no tama - a Rakugo repertoire in which the main character's wife and lover both go on ushi no toki mairi.
- shikigami – Term for a being from Japanese folklore
- shintai – Objects worshipped at or near Shinto shrines
- Voodoo doll – Effigy into which pins are inserted
- witching hour – Time of night associated with supernatural events
