= Hashihime =

Japanese folklore character associated with bridges

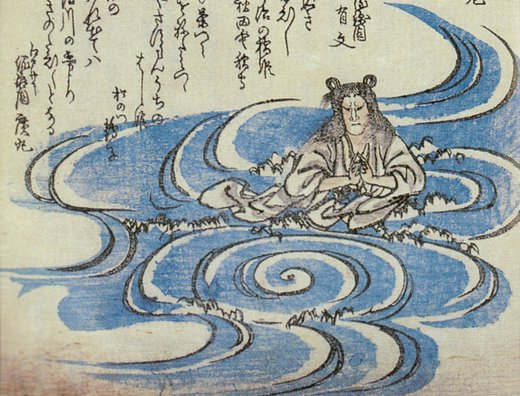
"Hashihime" as depicted in the Kyōka Hyaku Monogatari (1853), illustrated by Ryūkansai Masasumi.

Hashihime (橋姫, 'Bridge Princess' or 'Bridge Maiden') is a character appearing in Japanese folklore and literature. She first appeared in Japanese Heian literature, initially represented as a woman spending lonely nights waiting for her lover. Later legends depicted her as a guardian spirit of bridges, or alternatively as a fierce kijo (female demon) fueled by jealousy. She is most famously associated with a bridge in Uji.

== Origins and etymology ==
The origins of Hashihime beliefs are multifaceted. Primarily, large and ancient bridges were often believed to have a guardian deity, the Hashihime, who protected the bridge from external threats. This may stem from older water deity worship, where pairs of male and female deities were enshrined at bridge crossings.

The common interpretation of Hashihime as intensely jealous may derive from several sources. Local deities often dislike mentions of other places, which, combined with local worshippers' pride, might have been interpreted as jealousy when applied to a female deity. Alternatively, the name itself might involve a pun: hashi (橋, bridge) sounds similar to the classical Japanese word hashi (愛し), meaning "lovely" or "beloved." Thus, "Hashihime" could imply both "Bridge Princess" and "Beloved Maiden," linking the guardian role with themes of love and longing. Legends claim that praising another bridge while on a Hashihime's bridge, or reciting Noh chants about female jealousy (like Aoi no Ue), could invoke her wrath.

While the Hashihime of Uji is the most famous, similar traditions exist for the Nagara Bridge in Osaka (shrine no longer extant) and the Seta no Karahashi bridge in Shiga Prefecture.

== In literature ==
=== Kokin Wakashū ===
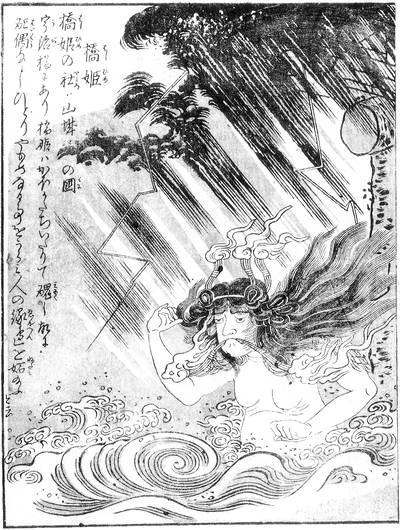
"Hashihime" from Toriyama Sekien's Konjaku Gazu Zoku Hyakki (1779). The caption identifies her shrine at Uji Bridge.

Hashihime appears early in Japanese literature, notably in the Kokin Wakashū (ca. 905), in an anonymous poem (Book 14, Love IV, poem #689):

さむしろに衣かたしきこよひもや我をまつらむうちのはしひめ

Samushiro ni / koromo katashiki / koyoi mo ya / ware o matsuran / Uji no Hashihime

Upon a narrow grass mat / laying out but one sleeve of her robe / tonight, again – / she must be waiting for me, / the Maiden of Uji Bridge?

In waka poetry, Hashihime often embodies pathos and loneliness, waiting for an absent lover, contrasting sharply with her later demonic portrayals.

=== The Tale of the Heike (Sword Chapter) ===
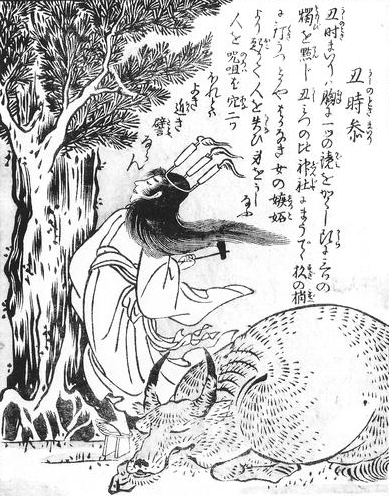
"Ushi no toki mairi" from Sekien's Konjaku Gazu Zoku Hyakki. The ritual depicted mirrors that performed by the Hashihime in legend.

The most famous legend establishing Hashihime as a jealous demon originates from the "Tsurugi no maki" (Chapter of the Sword). This chapter is found in expanded variant texts of The Tale of the Heike, such as the Genpei Jōsuiki and the Yashirobon manuscript, and also appears in the Taiheiki.

The story is set during the reign of Emperor Saga (809–823). A noblewoman, consumed by jealousy towards a rival, performs a seven-day retreat at Kifune Shrine. She prays to the deity (Kifune Myōjin) to turn her into a living kijo (demoness) to exact revenge. Taking pity, the deity instructs her: "If you truly wish to become a demon, change your appearance and immerse yourself in the rapids of the Uji River for twenty-one days."

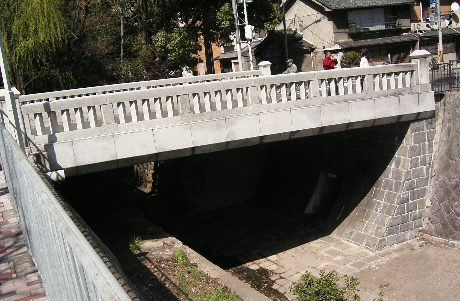
The present-day Horikawa River and Modoribashi Bridge in Kyoto, site of Watanabe no Tsuna's encounter with Hashihime.

She returns to the capital (Heian-kyō), ties her hair into five horns, paints her body red with cinnabar and red lead, and dons an inverted iron tripod (kanawa) on her head, lighting torches on its legs. She also carries a torch lit at both ends in her mouth. In this terrifying guise, she runs south, causing onlookers to die of fright. She immerses herself in the Uji River for 21 days, successfully transforming into the Hashihime demon.

She then proceeds to kill her rival, the rival's family, her former lover's family, and eventually countless innocent people in the capital, changing her form as needed (woman to kill men, man to kill women). Fear grips the city, forcing residents indoors after dusk.

The narrative then jumps forward nearly two centuries to the time of the warrior Minamoto no Yorimitsu (late 10th-early 11th century). Yorimitsu sends his retainer, Watanabe no Tsuna (one of the Four Heavenly Kings), on an errand. Due to the danger, Yorimitsu lends Tsuna his legendary sword, Higekiri. On his return, Tsuna crosses the Ichijō Modoribashi bridge over the Horikawa River (not the Uji Bridge). There, he encounters a beautiful woman who asks for an escort. After Tsuna helps her onto his horse, she reveals her true demonic form, grabs his hair, and attempts to fly him to her lair on Mount Atago. Tsuna reacts quickly, drawing Higekiri and severing the demon's arm. He falls near Kitano Tenmangū shrine, while the demon escapes, leaving her arm behind. The arm, once appearing white, is now black and covered in coarse white hair.

Yorimitsu consults the famous onmyōji Abe no Seimei. Seimei performs rituals to seal the demonic arm, and Tsuna undergoes purification rites for seven days. The sword Higekiri is said to have been renamed Onikiri (鬼切, "Demon Cutter") after this event.

Notably, the legend connects the origin ritual to Uji River/Bridge but depicts the famous encounter at Ichijō Modoribashi in central Kyoto, and involves a significant chronological leap between Emperor Saga's era and Tsuna's lifetime.

=== The Tale of Genji ===
Hashihime's name appears prominently in Murasaki Shikibu's The Tale of Genji (early 11th century).

- It is the title of Chapter 45, "Hashihime" (The Bridge Maiden / The Lady at the Bridge).
- The character is also alluded to several times in waka poems within the novel, often invoking the image of a woman waiting forlornly at the Uji Bridge.

=== Other literature ===
Hashihime is mentioned in other works like the Taiheiki and the Hashihime Monogatari. The Tale of Genji Museum in Uji features an original short film titled "Hashihime: The Hearts of Women."

== Associated legends and concepts ==
=== Kanawa (Noh play) ===
The Noh play Kanawa (鉄輪, 'The Iron Tripod') dramatizes the demonic transformation legend from the "Tsurugi no maki". The protagonist is a wife abandoned for another woman. She undertakes the ritual (wearing the iron tripod, hence the title) to become a demon and curse the couple. They seek help from Abe no Seimei, who uses katashiro (effigies) to counter the curse. The demoness appears in her terrifying form (using the specific "Hashihime" Noh mask) but is ultimately repelled by Seimei and guardian deities. Watanabe no Tsuna does not appear in this adaptation.

=== Ushi no toki mairi ===
The specific curse ritual performed by the woman in the Hashihime legend—dressing in white, wearing an iron tripod with candles, visiting a shrine at the Hour of the Ox (1-3 AM), and striking a nail into a sacred tree—is considered the archetype for the traditional Japanese curse ritual known as ushi no toki mairi (丑の刻参り, "ox-hour shrine visit"). The Kifune Shrine, where Hashihime prayed in the legend, remains famously associated with this practice.

== Associated shrines ==
=== Hashihime shrine (Uji) ===
Located near the Uji Bridge in Kyoto, Hashihime Shrine (橋姫神社, Hashihime-jinja) is popularly associated with the Hashihime of legend. Though officially enshrining Seoritsuhime (a purification goddess often linked to water and bridges), the shrine is widely identified with the jealous Hashihime. While she is venerated as a guardian of the bridge, she is also considered a deity of enkiri – severing unwanted relationships. Due to her legendary jealousy, it is considered taboo for couples, especially newlyweds, to cross the Uji Bridge or visit the shrine together.

=== Aekuni Hashihime shrine (Ise) ===
A separate shrine, Aekuni Hashihime Shrine (饗土橋姫神社, Aekuni Hashihime-jinja), exists near the Uji Bridge (宇治橋, Uji-bashi – a different bridge with the same phonetic name) that spans the Isuzu River within the Ise Grand Shrine complex in Mie Prefecture. Likely founded later (Kamakura or Muromachi period), it was originally called Ōhashi Hashihime Gozen-sha. "Aekuni" refers to the locality, associated with rituals against plagues. Unlike the Uji Hashihime, this deity has no association with jealousy, demons, or curses, and likely also enshrines Seoritsuhime as a bridge guardian.

== In popular culture ==
The shoot 'em up game Touhou Chireiden ~ Subterranean Animism features the character Mizuhashi Parsee as the Stage 2 boss. She is explicitly identified as a Hashihime who guards a bridge connecting the surface world to the underworld and possesses the ability to manipulate jealousy.
