= Hinamatsuri =

Japanese holiday

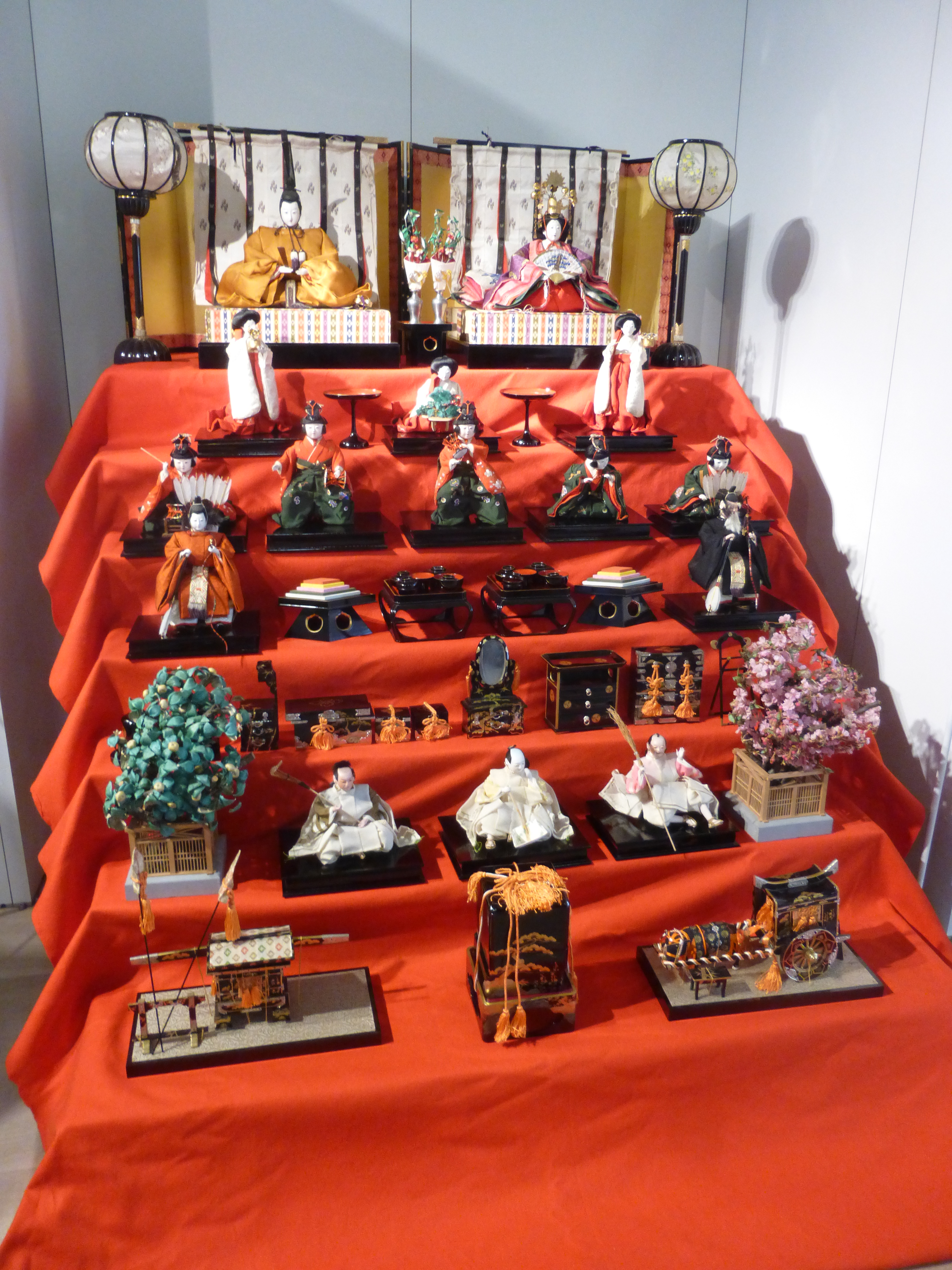
- Seven-tiered hina doll set
- Official name: Hinamatsuri (since 1687)
- Also called: Japanese Doll Festival, Girls' Day
- Observed by: Japan
- Significance: Celebrating the health and happiness of young girls and women
- Date: 3 March
- Frequency: Annual
- Related to: Shangsi Festival, Samjinnal

Hinamatsuri (Japanese: 雛祭り), also called Doll's Day or Girls' Day, is an annual festival in Japan (but not a national holiday), celebrated on 3 March of each year. Platforms covered with a red carpet material are used to display a set of ornamental dolls (雛人形, hina-ningyō) representing the emperor, empress, attendants, and musicians in traditional court dress of the Heian period.

== Customs ==
Hinamatsuri is one of the five seasonal festivals (五節句, gosekku) that are held on auspicious dates of the Lunisolar calendar: the first day of the first month, the third day of the third month, and so on. After the adoption of the Gregorian calendar, these were fixed on 1 January, 3 March, 5 May, 7 July, and 9 September. The festival was traditionally known as the Peach Festival (桃の節句, Momo no Sekku), as peach trees typically began to flower around this time. Although this is no longer true since the shift to Gregorian dates, the name remains and peaches are still symbolic of the festival.

The primary aspect of Hinamatsuri is the display of seated female and male dolls (the mebina (女雛, 'female doll') and obina (男雛, 'male doll')), which represent a Heian period wedding, but are usually described as the Empress and Emperor of Japan. The dolls are usually seated on red cloth, and may be as simple as pictures or folded paper dolls, or as intricate as carved three-dimensional dolls. More elaborate displays will include a multi-tiered doll stand (雛壇, hinadan) of dolls that represent ladies of the court, musicians, and other attendants, with all sorts of accoutrements. The entire set of dolls and accessories is called the hinakazari (雛飾り). The number of tiers and dolls a family may have depends on their budget.

Families normally ensure that girls have a set of the two main dolls before their first Hinamatsuri. The dolls are usually fairly expensive ($1,500 to $2,500 for a five-tier set, depending on quality) and may be handed down from older generations as heirlooms. The hinakazari spends most of the year in storage, and girls and their mothers begin setting up the display a few days before 3 March (boys and men normally do not participate, as 5 May, now Children's Day, was historically called "Boys' Day"). Traditionally, the dolls were supposed to be put away by the day after Hinamatsuri, the superstition being that leaving the dolls any longer will result in a late marriage for the daughter, but some families may leave them up for the entire month of March. Practically speaking, the encouragement to put everything away quickly is to avoid the rainy season and humidity that typically follows Hinamatsuri.

Historically, the dolls were used as toys, but in modern times they are intended for display only. The display of dolls is usually discontinued when the girls reach ten years of age.

During Hinamatsuri and the preceding days, girls hold parties with their friends. Typical foods include hina-arare (雛あられ, multi-colored rice crackers), chirashizushi (ちらし寿司, raw fish and vegetables on rice in a bowl or bento box), hishi mochi (菱餅, multi-colored rice cakes), ichigo daifuku (いちご大福, strawberries wrapped in adzuki bean paste), Sakuramochi (桜餅) and ushiojiru (うしお汁, clam soup, as clam shells represent a joined pair). The customary drink is shirozake (白酒, lit. "white sake"), also called amazake (甘酒, lit. "sweet sake"), a non-alcoholic sake.

Nagashi-bina (流し雛; lit. 'doll floating') ceremonies are held around the country, where participants make dolls out of paper or straw and send them on a boat down a river, carrying one's impurities and sin with them. Some locations, such as at the Nagashibina Doll Museum in Tottori City, still follow the lunisolar calendar instead of doing it on 3 March.This custom traces back to the Kyokusui no en of the Nara period, in which people gathered on riverbanks to drink, purify themselves of impurities, and compose tanka poems while cups of sake floated along the current. During the Heian period, Japanese aristocratic families adapted the practice as Jōshi no harai: an onmyōji was summoned to perform a purification rite in which a doll was rubbed against the body to absorb impurities before being set adrift on a river.

Tsurushi-Bina (吊るし雛; lit. 'Hanging Dolls'), traditional decoration for Hinamatsuri, are lengths of coloured cords (usually in red), usually featuring decorations of miniature baby-dolls, which were originally made from leftover kimono silk (so the idea of repurposing fabric scraps is central to this craft; it is a great activity for using up leftover materials). Tsurushi-Bina are not limited to featuring miniature baby-dolls, but also flowers (i.e., camellia flower, etc.), shells, Temari balls, colourful triangles to represent mountains (such as Mount Fuji, etc.), etc., and with tassels at the bottom.

== Origin ==
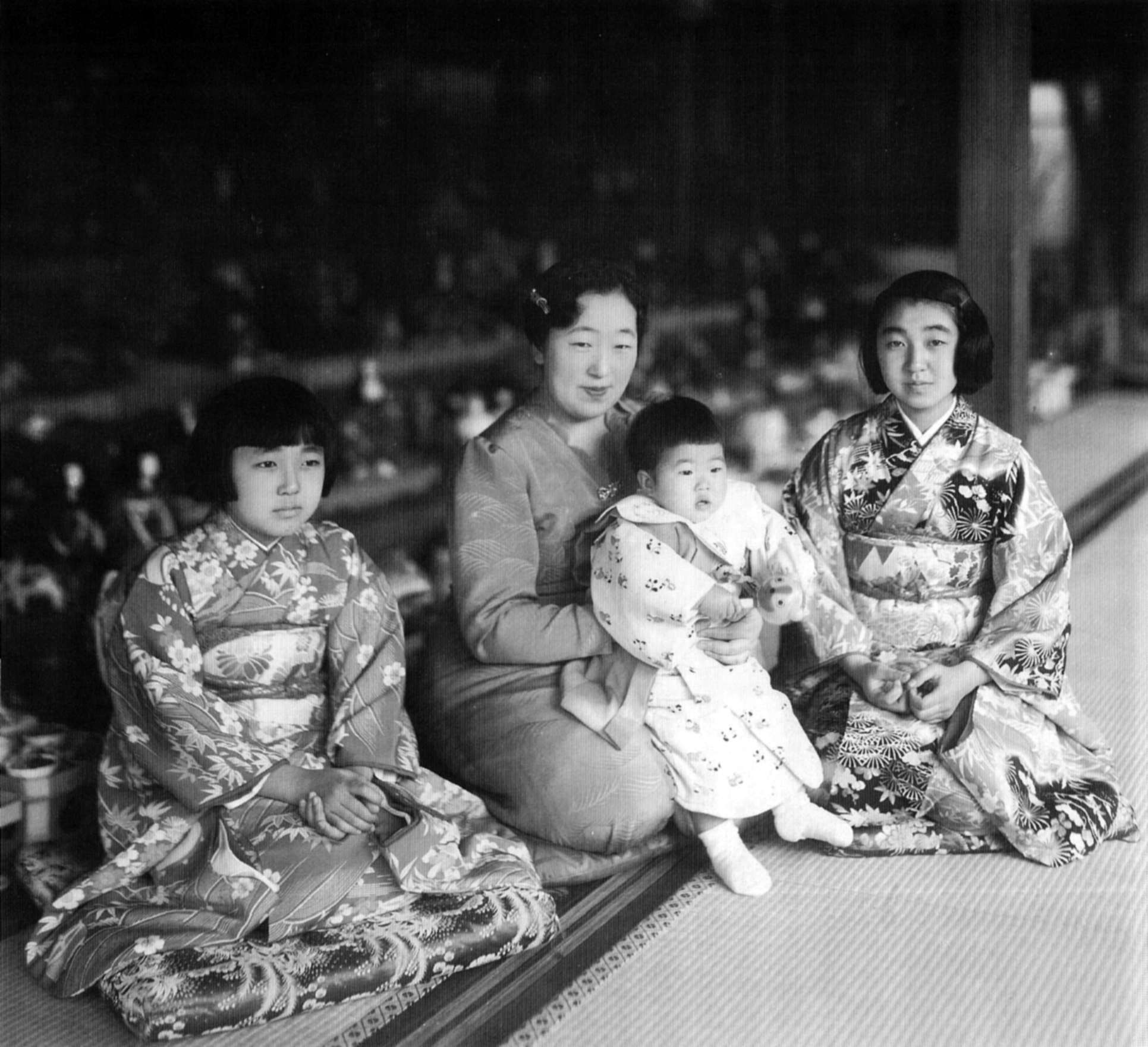
Empress Kōjun attending the festival with her daughters, c. 1940

It is said that the first time hina dolls were shown in the manner they are now as part of the Peach Festival was when the young princess Meisho succeeded to the throne of her abdicating father, Emperor Go-Mizunoo, in 1629. Because empresses regnant in Japan at the time were not allowed to get married, Meisho's mother, Tokugawa Masako, created a doll arrangement showing Meisho blissfully wedded. Hinamatsuri then officially became the name of the festival in 1687. Doll-makers began making elaborate dolls for the festival (some growing as tall as 3 feet (0.91 meters) high before laws were passed restricting their size). Over time, the hinakazari evolved to include fifteen dolls and accessories. As dolls became more expensive, tiers were added to the hinadan so that the expensive ones could be placed out of the reach of young children.

During the Meiji period as Japan began to modernize and the emperor was restored to power, Hinamatsuri was deprecated in favor of new holidays that focused on the emperor's supposed bond with the nation. By focusing on marriage and families, it represented Japanese hopes and values. The dolls were said to represent the emperor and empress; they also fostered respect for the throne. The holiday then spread to other countries via the Japanese diaspora, although it remains confined to Japanese immigrant communities and descendants.

== Placement of dolls ==
The actual placement order of the dolls from left to right varies according to family tradition and location, but the order of dolls per level is the same. The layer of covering is called dankake (段掛) or simply hi-mōsen (緋毛氈), a red carpet with rainbow stripes at the bottom. The description that follows is for a complete set.

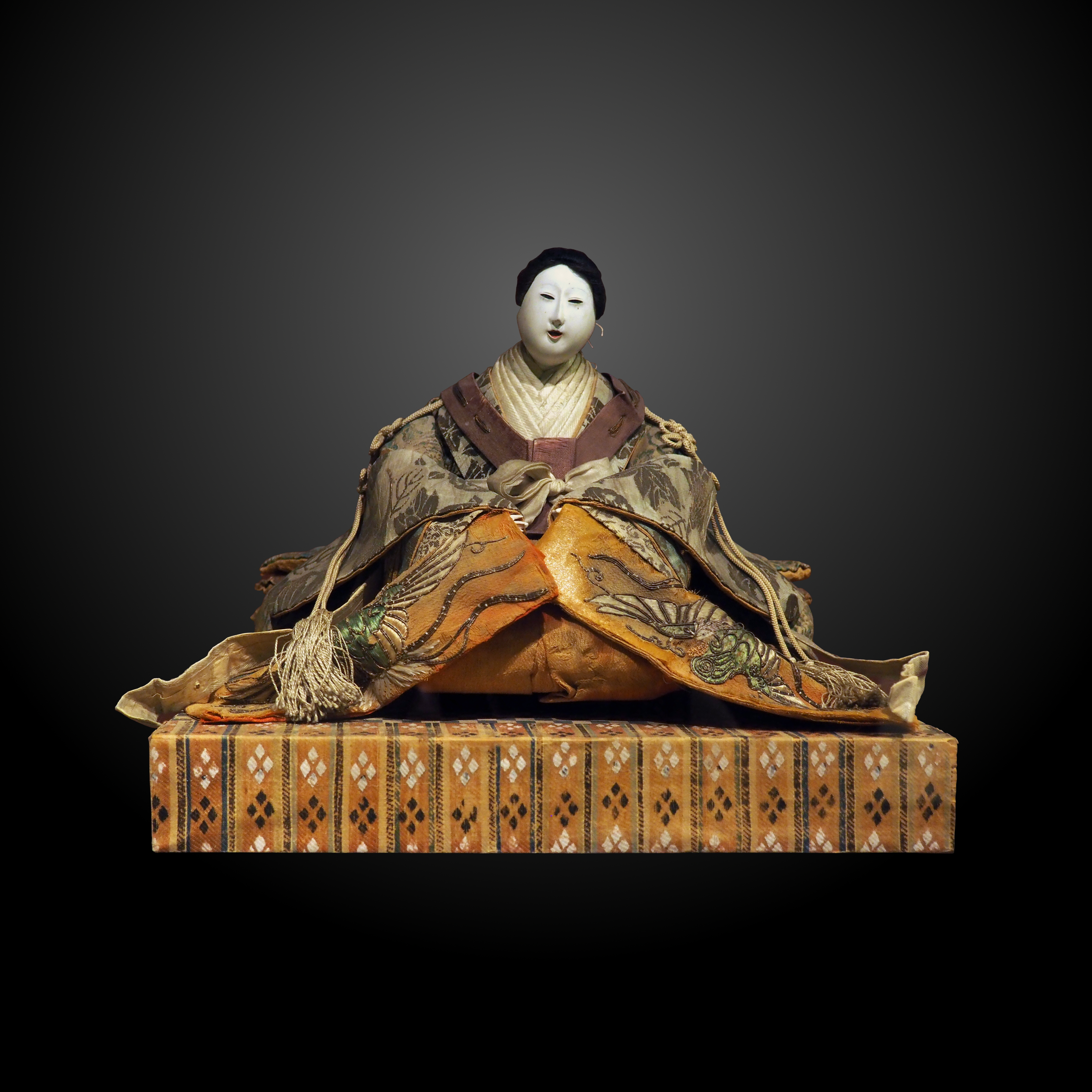
18th-century mebina, Empress doll, on display at Musée d'ethnographie de Genève

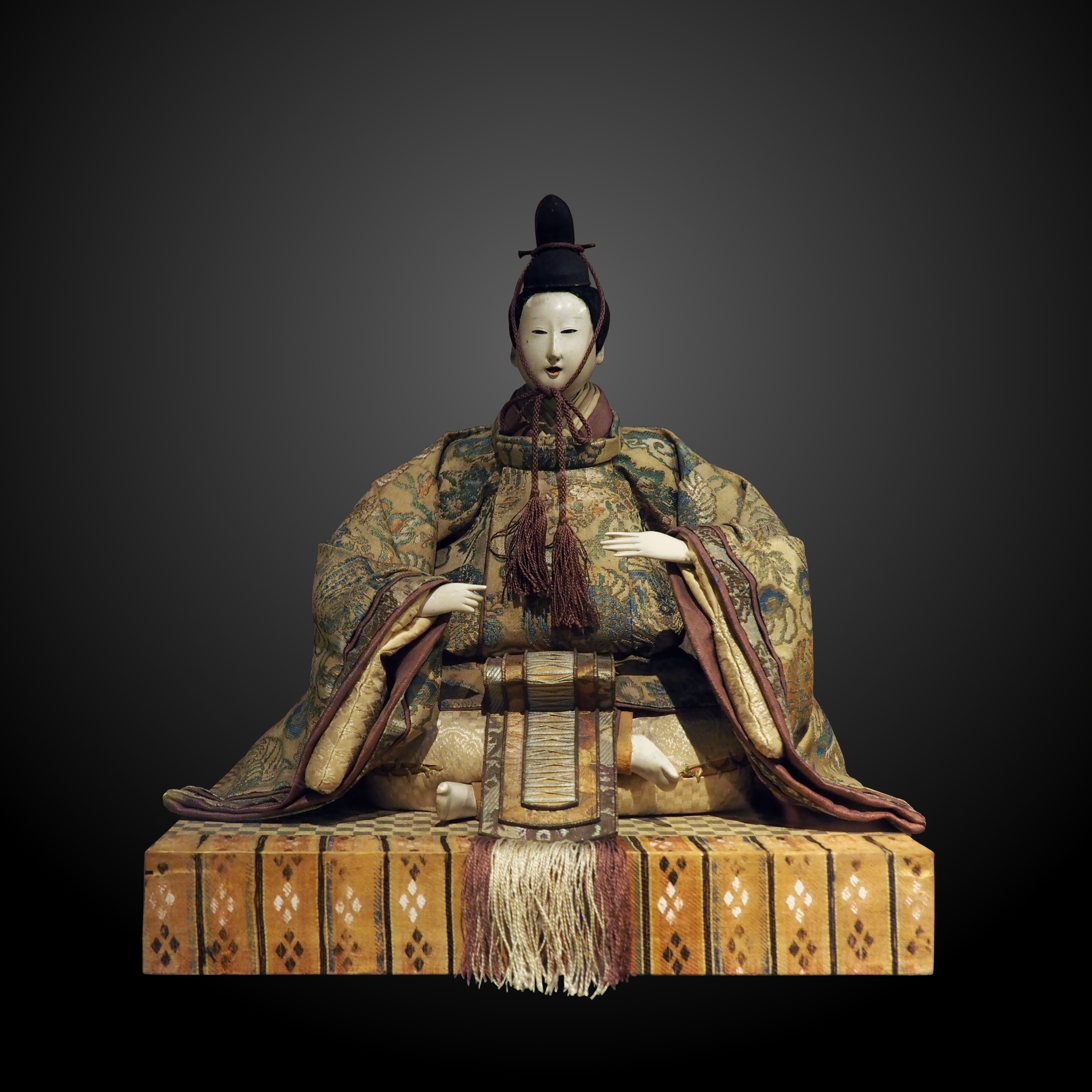
18th century obina, Emperor doll, on display at Musée d'ethnographie de Genève

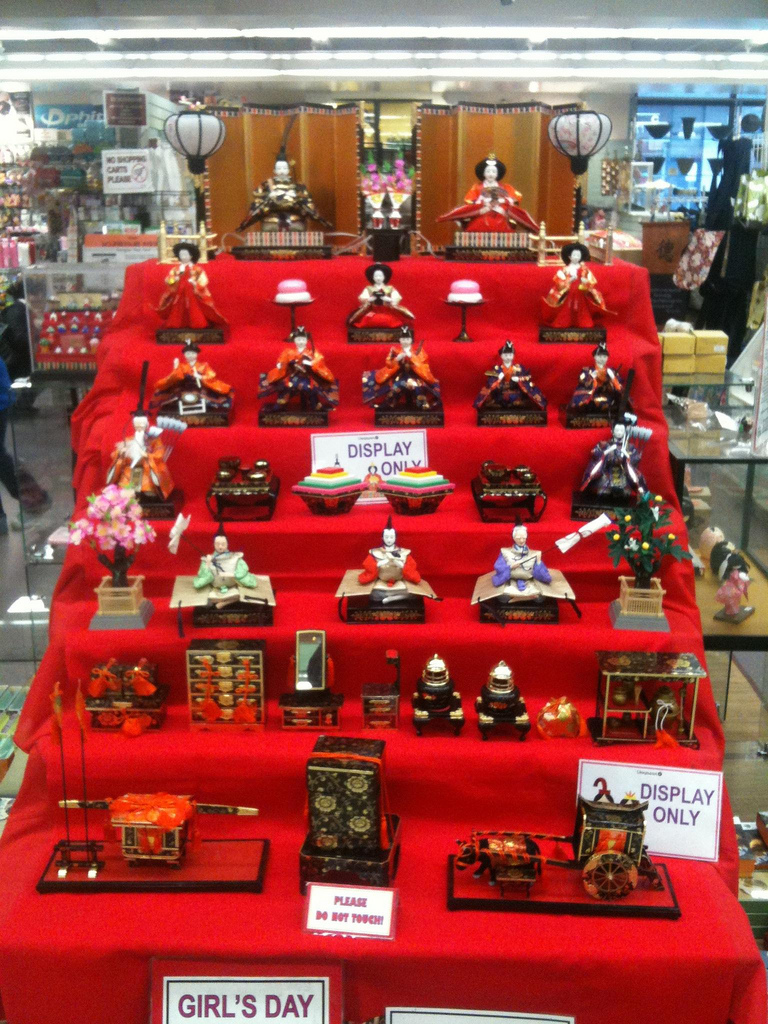
Hinamatsuri store display in Seattle, Washington, featuring all 7 tiers.

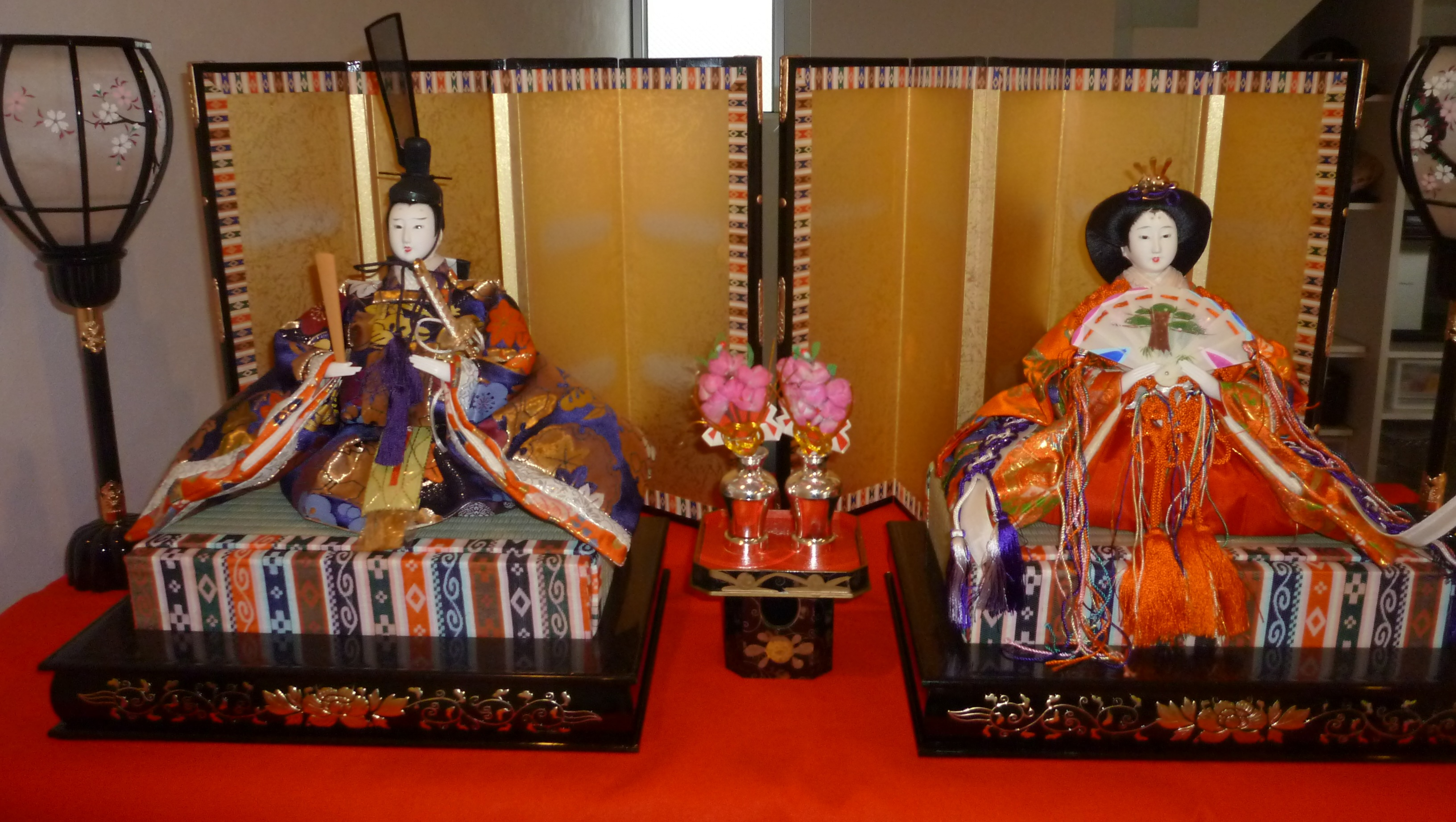
An Emperor doll with an Empress doll, in front of a gold screen. The optional lampstands are also partially visible.

(video) A seven platform doll set next to a three platform set.

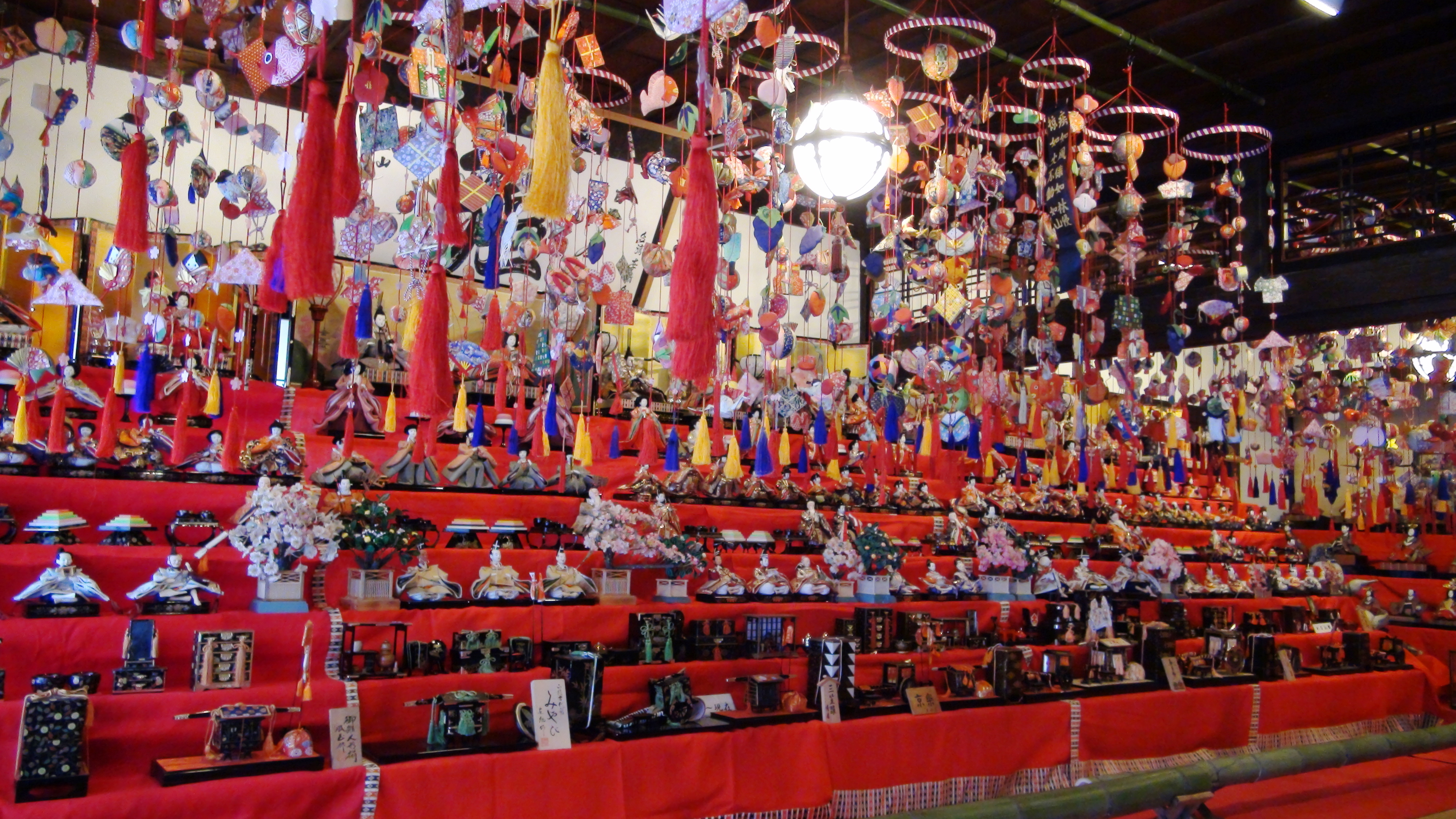
Tsurushibina is a variation of the traditional Hina-Ningyō dolls (Kanzo-Yashiki, Kōshū, Yamanashi Prefecture).

=== First, top platform ===
The top tier holds two dolls, known as imperial dolls (内裏雛, dairi-bina). The word dairi means "imperial palace". These are the obina holding a ritual baton (笏, shaku) and mebina holding a fan. The pair are also known as tono (殿) and hime (姫) (lord and princess) or Odairi-sama (御内裏様) and Ohina-sama (御雛様) (honored palace official and honored doll). Although they are sometimes referred to as the Emperor and Empress, they only represent the positions and not particular individuals themselves (with the exception of some dolls from the Meiji Era that actually depict Emperor Meiji and Empress Shōken). The two are usually placed in front of a gold folding screen byōbu (屏風) and placed beside green Japanese garden trees.

Optional are the two lampstands, called bonbori (雪洞), and the paper or silk lanterns that are known as hibukuro (火袋), which are usually decorated with cherry or plum blossom patterns.

Complete sets would include accessories placed between the two figures, known as sanbō kazari (三方飾), composing of two vases of artificial peach branches (口花, kuchibana).

Generally speaking, the Kansai style arrangement has the male on the right, while Kantō style arrangements have him on the left (from the viewer's perspective).

=== Second platform ===
The second tier holds three court ladies san-nin kanjo (三人官女) who serve sake to the male and female dolls. Commonly, two dolls are standing on both sides of one seated doll, but there are people who use two seated dolls on both sides of one standing doll.

The doll on the viewer's left bears a short-handled sake decanter (加えの銚子, Kuwae no chōshi). The one on the viewer's right holds a long-handled sake decanter (長柄の銚子, Nagae no chōshi). The doll in the middle carries different items in Kyoto compared with the rest of Japan. In Kyoto, the middle doll carries a small platform used in celebratory decorations (島台, Shimadai) upon which is something auspicious such as the Three Friends of Winter (松竹梅, Shōchikubai); whereas in the rest of Japan, she carries a small table (三方, Sanpō) upon which a sake cup is rested.

Accessories placed between the ladies are takatsuki (高坏), stands with round table-tops for seasonal sweets, excluding hishi mochi.

=== Third platform ===
The third tier holds five male musicians gonin bayashi (五人囃子). Each holds a musical instrument except the singer, who holds a fan:

1. Small drum (太鼓, Taiko), seated,
2. Large drum (大鼓, Ōtsuzumi), standing,
3. Hand drum (小鼓, Kotsuzumi), standing,
4. Flute (笛, Fue), or Yokobue (横笛), seated,
5. Singer (謡い方, Utaikata), holding a folding fan (扇子, sensu), standing.

There are ancient sets with seven or ten musicians and at least one with female musicians.

=== Fourth platform ===
Two ministers (大臣, daijin) may be displayed on the fourth tier. These may be the emperor's bodyguards or administrators in Kyoto: the Minister of the Right (右大臣, Udaijin) and the Minister of the Left (左大臣, Sadaijin). Both are sometimes equipped with bows and arrows. When representing the ministers, the Minister of the Right is depicted as a young person, while the Minister of the Left is older because that position was the more senior of the two. Also, because the dolls are placed in positions relative to each other, the Minister of the Right will be on "stage right" (the viewer's left) and the Minister of the Left will be on the other side.

Between the two figures are covered bowl tables (掛盤膳, kakebanzen), also referred to as o-zen (お膳), as well as diamond-shaped stands (菱台, hishidai) bearing diamond-shaped hishi mochi.

Just below the ministers: on the rightmost, a mandarin orange tree (右近の橘, Ukon no tachibana), and on the leftmost, a cherry blossom tree (左近の桜, Sakon no sakura).

=== Fifth platform ===
The fifth tier, between the plants, holds three helpers (仕丁, shichō) or protectors (衛士, eji) of the Emperor and Empress:

In the Kyōto style, from the viewer's left to right the dolls are:

1. Crying drinker nakijōgo (泣き上戸) bearing a rake (熊手, kumade),
2. Angry drinker okorijōgo (怒り上戸) bearing a dustpan (ちり取り, chiritori), and
3. Laughing drinker waraijōgo (笑い上戸) bearing a broom (箒, houki)

In the Kantō style used in the rest of Japan, from the viewer's left to right the dolls are:

1. Angry drinker okorijōgo (怒り上戸) bearing an umbrella hat (台笠, daikasa) at the end of a pole,
2. Crying drinker nakijōgo (泣き上戸) bearing a shoe platform (沓台, kutsudai), and
3. Laughing drinker waraijōgo (笑い上戸) bearing an umbrella (立傘, tachigasa)

=== Other platforms ===
On the sixth and seventh tiers, various miniature furniture, tools, carriages, etc., are displayed.

==== Sixth platform ====
These are items used within the palatial residence.

- tansu (箪笥): chest of (usually five) drawers, sometimes with swinging outer covering doors.
- nagamochi (長持): long chest for kimono storage.
- hasamibako (挟箱): smaller clothing storage box, placed on top of nagamochi.
- kyōdai (鏡台): literally mirror stand, a smaller chest of drawers with a mirror on top.
- haribako (針箱): sewing kit box.
- two hibachi (火鉢): braziers.
- daisu (台子): a set of ocha dōgu (お茶道具) or cha no yu dōgu (茶の湯道具), utensils for the tea ceremony.

==== Seventh, bottom platform ====
These are items used when away from the palatial residence.

- jubako (重箱), a set of nested lacquered food boxes with either a cord tied vertically around the boxes or a stiff handle that locks them together.
- gokago (御駕籠 or 御駕篭, a palanquin.
- goshoguruma (御所車), an ox-drawn carriage favored by Heian nobility. This last is sometimes known as gisha or gyuusha (牛車).
- Less common, hanaguruma (花車), an ox drawing a cart of flowers.

== See also ==
- Golu – a similar tradition in India
- Hōko (doll) – A talisman doll, given to young women of age and especially to pregnant women in Japan to protect both mother and unborn child
- International Day of the Girl Child
- International Women's Day
- Japanese dolls
- Japanese festivals
- Japanese traditional dolls
- Karakuri puppet – Japanese clockwork automata
- Katashiro
- Public holidays in Japan
- Tango no Sekku
- Yurihonjo hinakaido – an annual trail of hina doll displays in Yurihonjo City
