= Kifune Shrine =

Shinto shrine in Kyoto Prefecture, Japan

- 貴船神社 (Kifune Jinja)
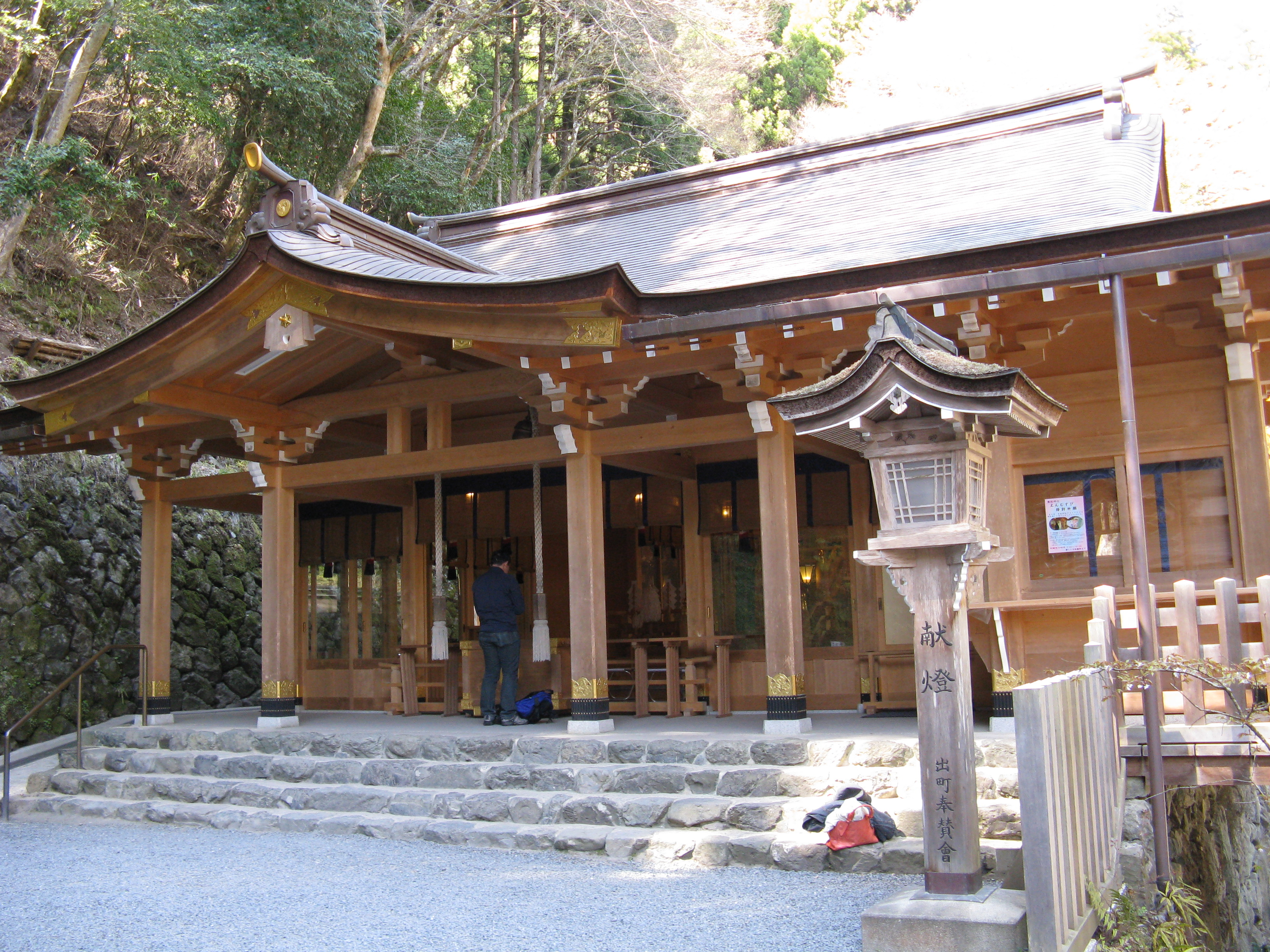

- Location within Kyoto Prefecture Location within Japan

Religion
- Affiliation: Shinto
- Deity: Kuraokami

Location
- Coordinates: 35°07′18″N 135°45′46″E

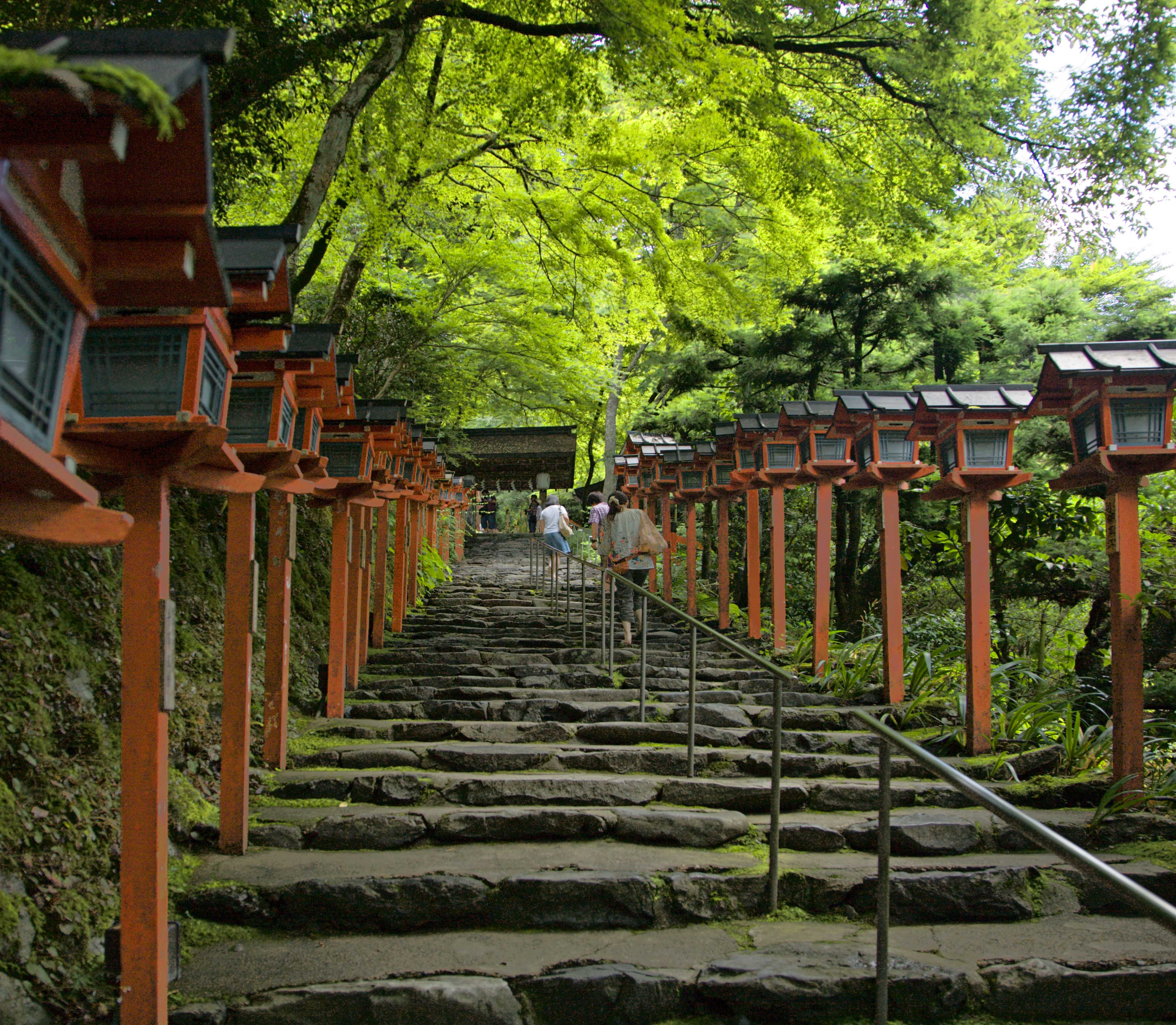
The sandō at Kifune Shrine

Kifune Shrine (貴船神社, Kifune Jinja) is a Shinto shrine located at Sakyō-ku, Kyoto, Kyoto Prefecture Japan.

== History ==
The shrine became the object of Imperial patronage during the early Heian period. In 965, Emperor Murakami ordered that Imperial messengers were sent to report important events to the guardian kami of Japan. These heihaku were initially presented to 16 shrines including the Kifune Shrine.

From 1871 through 1946, the Kifune Shrine was officially designated one of the Modern system of ranked Shinto Shrines (官幣中社; Kanpei-chūsha), meaning that it stood in the second rank of government supported shrines.

The shrine is also associated with the Ushi no toki mairi, the ritual of wearing candles on one's head and laying a curse at a shrine during the "hour of the Ox", since it is from the resident deity that Hashihime (Princess of the Uji Bridge) learns the prescribed ritual to turn herself into an oni demon to exact vengeance, the story of which is immortalized in the Noh play Kanawa ("The Iron Crown").

== See also ==
- List of Shinto shrines
- Twenty-Two Shrines
- Modern system of ranked Shinto Shrines
