= Hakata doll =

Traditional Japanese clay dolls originating from Fukuoka, Japan

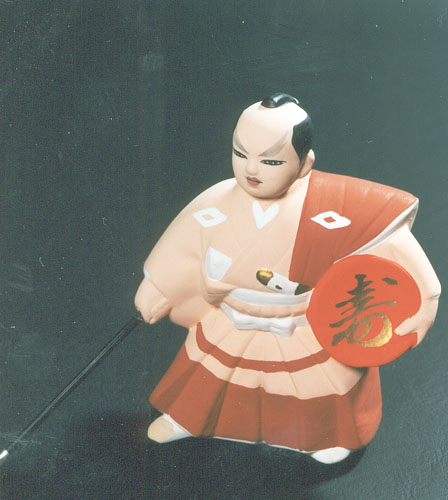
A Hakata figurine of a bushi of the Kuroda clan

A Hakata doll (博多人形, Hakata ningyō) is a traditional Japanese clay doll, originally from the city of Fukuoka, part of which was previously named Hakata before the city merger in 1889.

== History ==
The commonly accepted origin of Hakata dolls is 17th-century Hakata. Artisans including Souichi Masaki produced unglazed Hakata doll (博多素焼人形, Hakata suyaki ningyō) in clay, as offerings to Buddhist temples or as gifts to Kuroda Nagamasa, the ruler of Hakata at that time. Hakata also has a famous festival, Hakata Gion Yamakasa, which involves decorated ningyō (doll) floats. The floats are made from wood, but it is believed that the method of production of these floats strongly influenced the Hakata doll.

Hakata dolls appeared in the 1890 National Industrial Exhibition in Japan and in the Exposition Universelle (Paris World Expo) in 1900 and became a topic of discussion. “Dolls of the World” were made with Hakata techniques and were well received at the Paris expo; they are now in a collection at the General Research Museum at Tokyo University. Delicately made with rich coloration, these “Dolls of the World” were sold for 1 yen and 50 sen in those days.

At the end of the 19th century, Hakata dolls transformed from simple biscuit-fired toys to works of art. Master craftsman Rokusaburō Shirouzu began to study colour theory, human proportions, and other modern artistic theories and techniques under Itusyo Yada, an oil painter, which led to the production of more realistic Hakata. Yoichi Kojima, a student of Rokusaburō Shirouzu, won a gold medal in Paris' 1925 International Exhibition of Modern Decorative and Industrial Arts for his Hakata dolls, and fellow students Kihei Harada and Yoichi Oayu were awarded silver medals.

The Hakata doll gained fame when American soldiers took them back to the US as souvenirs during the American occupation of Japan following the Second World War. Japan started exporting Hakata dolls soon afterwards. At the same time, the Hakata doll became well known domestically, and factories began producing Hakata dolls of lesser quality. Although the image of the Hakata doll is no longer popular, some artisans continue to make Hakata dolls in the traditional fashion.

== See also ==
- List of Traditional Crafts of Japan
