= Iki doll =

Specific type of Japanese traditional doll

The term iki doll (生人形, iki-ningyō) refers to a specific type of Japanese traditional doll. They are life-sized lifelike dolls that were popular in misemono during the Edo period of Japan. Nowadays the name is mainly used to refer to shop store mannequins.

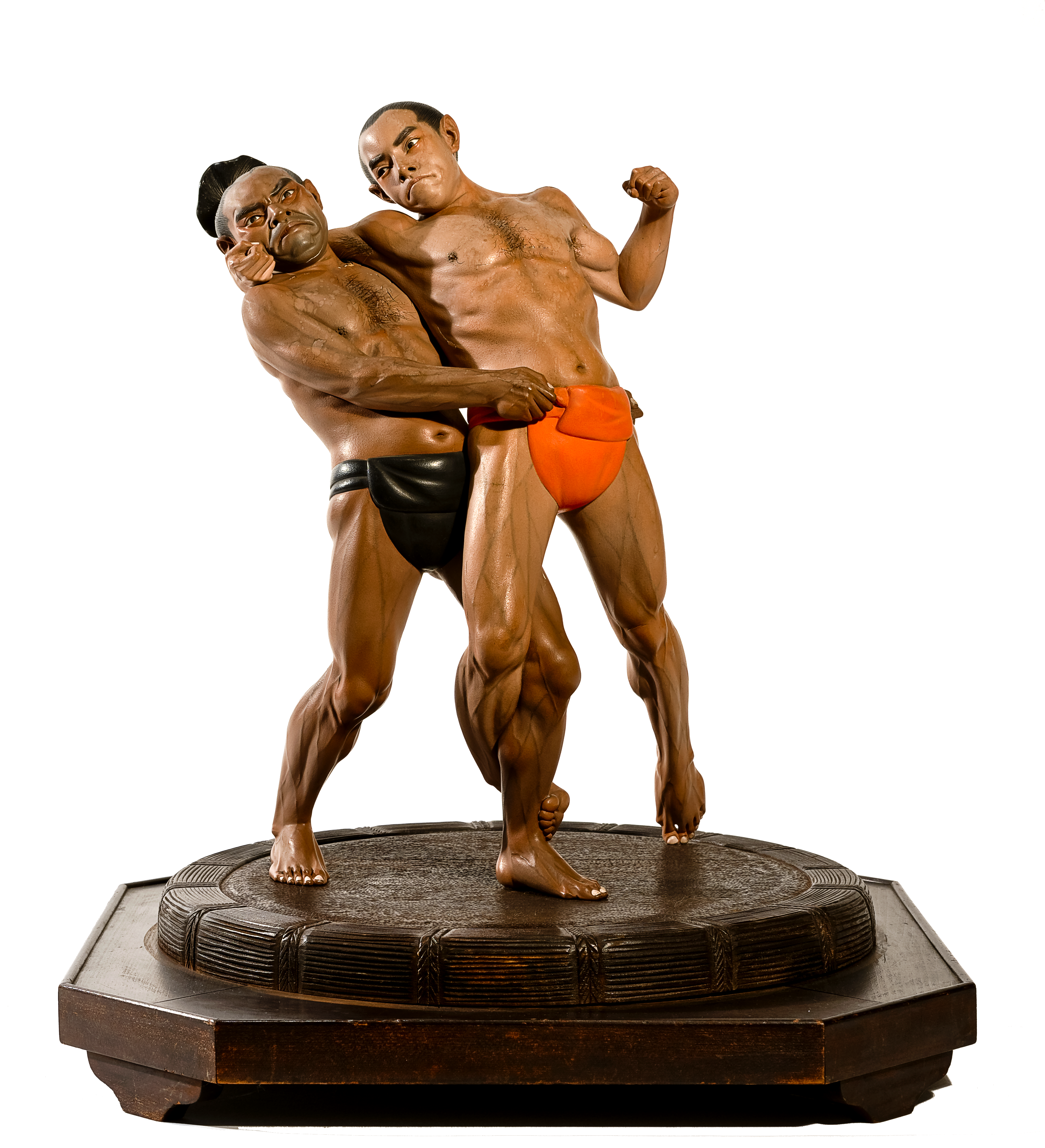
Japanese figure group entitled 'The Wrestlers' or 'Kawatso Saburo Overcoming Matano Goro'. The sculpture depicts Kawatso Saburo wrestling with Matano Goro during a famous sumo match of AD 1176. The pair are shown in the hold 'kawazu-gake' named after Saburo, the victor. This item is possibly a miniature example of Iki-ningyō (living dolls), the Japanese tradition of making life-sized life-like dolls which were popular in misemono (exhibitions) during the Edo period of Japan and showed dramatic historical scenes.

Artists famous for making iki-ningyō during the Edo period include Akiyama Heijūrō, Takedoa Nuinosuke, Matsumoto Kisaburō (松本喜三郎), and Yasumoto Kamehachi (安本亀八). The dolls that they made were novel not just for their context that shocked viewers — figures lying in pools of their own blood, for example, or Akiyama Heijuro's "Development of a Fetus", a life-sized model of a pregnant woman whose abdomen opens up to reveal twelve supposed stages of development of a human fetus in the womb — but also for their influence upon the genre of ningyō. The works of Kamehachi and Kisaburō, in particular, contributed to the emergence of an extreme sense of realism.

The earliest exhibition of iki-ningyō, as recorded in Tommori Seiichi's biography of Kamehachi, was on February 2, 1852, by Ōe Chūbei entitled Representations of Modern Dolls in this Year of Abundance in the Naniwashinchi brothel district of Osaka. Chūbei's name imayō-ningyō ("modern dolls") indicated that he considered this form of doll to be modern and new.
