= Hōko (doll) =

Japanese doll

A hōko (這子; lit. "crawling child") is a kind of soft-bodied doll given to young women of age and especially to pregnant women in Japan to protect both mother and unborn child. Traditionally, hōko dolls were made of silk and human hair, and stuffed with cotton. The dolls could be made for both boys and girls. Boys' dolls would be given up and "consecrated" at a shrine when boys came of age at 15 years old, while girls would give up their dolls at marriage. The dolls were given to children either at birth, or on special days shortly after birth. Pregnant women would be given new ones, so as to protect her and her unborn child together, for the duration of the pregnancy.

== History ==
Hōko can be traced back to "talismanic figures" from early Japanese history, and are likely related to the concept of using paper dolls (hina), as "stand-ins for people." The use of Katashiro (形代; lit. "substitutes") in spiritual practice as stand-ins to take on the brunt of a person's sins or misfortune also played a role in the creation of hōko dolls as well as for absentee family members (i.e. mother dolls for orphaned children).

=== Amagatsu ===
Amagatsu (天児; derivation unclear), also known-as "guardian dolls" or "hoko-hina" ("lowly child dolls"), are another type of doll similar in function as an amulet or talisman to the hōko doll, documented back to at least the 11th century with a mention in The Tale of Genji. Amagatsu were of simple construction: pairs of sticks (wood or bamboo) were strapped together--with the body and arms traditionally forming a "T" shape--a stuffed silk cloth head was attached-on-top and clothing draped on it. Sources mentioning the specific term hōko start appearing in the Heian period, but are more apparent in the Muromachi period of Japan's history; in the Muromachi era (1333-1568), these figures were kept by a child's bedside to ward off evil. It is also thought that a child's clothes should be hung on the T-form of the amagatsu, like a kimono stand, to take any evil elements away from the clothes. The hoko consisted of white silk stuffed with cotton and was presented to a child on his/her birth, often as an ubuyashinai (gift to a baby on the 3rd, 5th, and 9th nights). Used for both boys and girls, these dolls were a constant in their early life. Boys would keep them until the age of 15, when their "guardians" would be consecrated at a nearby shrine. In later years, the amagatsu and hōko dolls became essentially the same thing, with the dolls more commonly made out of cloth and other soft materials.

== See also ==
- Apotropaic magic
- Concealed shoes
- Hama Yumi
- Hinamatsuri
- Japanese traditional dolls
- Katashiro
- Kokeshi dolls
- Motanka doll
- Ofuda
- Poppet doll
- Shikigami
- Teru teru bōzu
- Ushabti
- Voodoo doll
- Witch bottle
