= Chrysanthemum Day =

Yearly Japanese festival

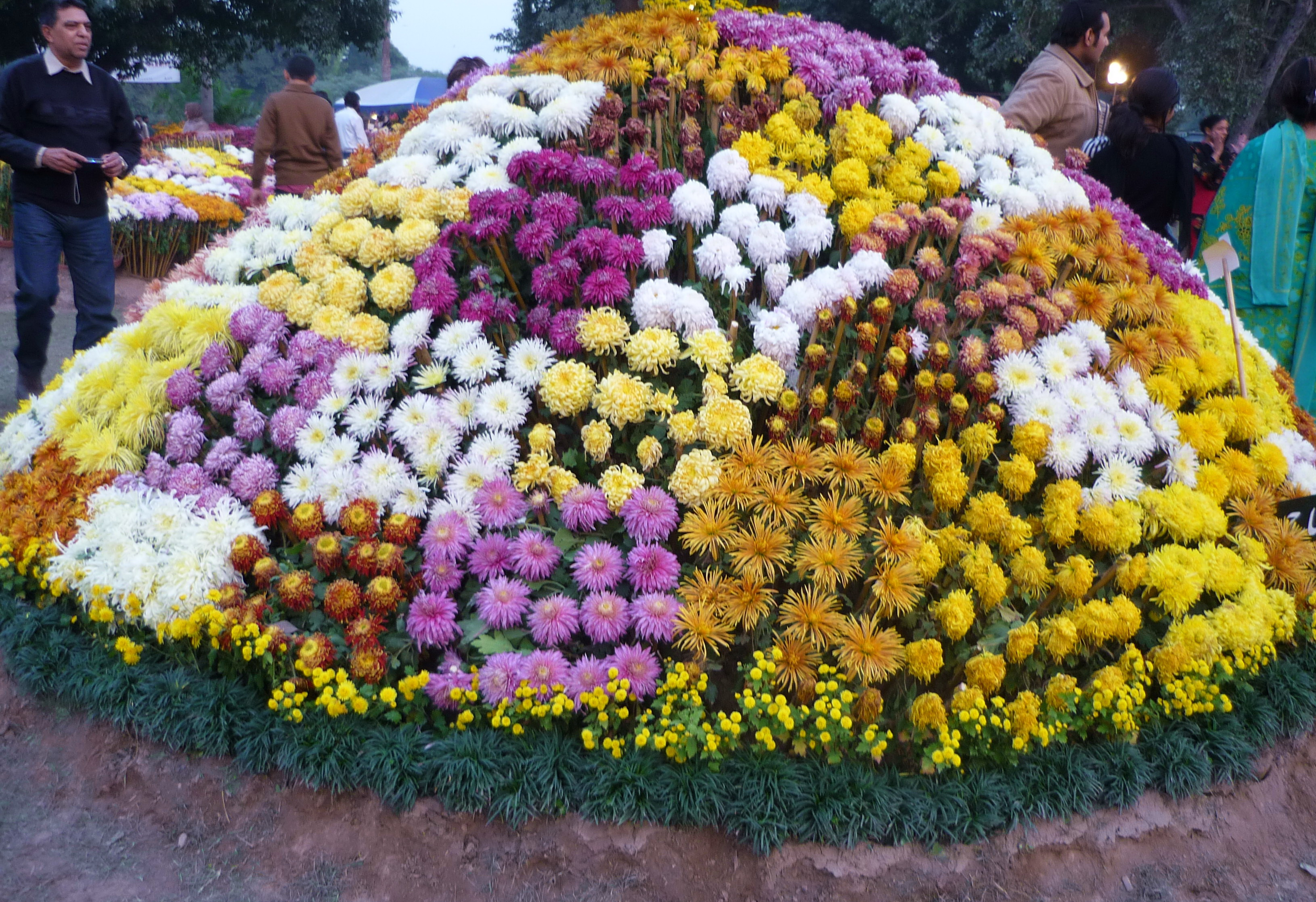
A display of Chrysanthemums

Chrysanthemum Day (菊の節句, Kiku no Sekku) is one of the five ancient sacred festivals of Japan. It is celebrated on the 9th day of the 9th month. It was started in 910, when the Japanese imperial court held its first chrysanthemum show. Chrysanthemums are the symbol of the Imperial House of Japan.

A popular custom of the Chrysanthemum Day festival is to drink sake with chrysanthemum petals in it. Another tradition is to lay cotton wool over individual chrysanthemum blooms to soak up the dew overnight. The chrysanthemum dew, which is believed to have healing powers, is wiped onto the face.

== See also ==
- Japanese calendar
