= Misemono =

During the Edo period, misemono (見世物), "shows" or "exhibitions", were an important part of Japanese urban culture. Many of the shows were put on hurriedly and were characterized by their crudeness. The term misemono dates from the Edo period, although plausible forerunners of the performances appear earlier. Among the likely antecedents of Edo-period shows were benefit performances undertaken to raise funds for shrines or temples. The shows were unhampered by attempts to conform to a particular artistic tradition and thus provide a valuable index to evolving popular taste.
