= Katashiro =

Shinto doll

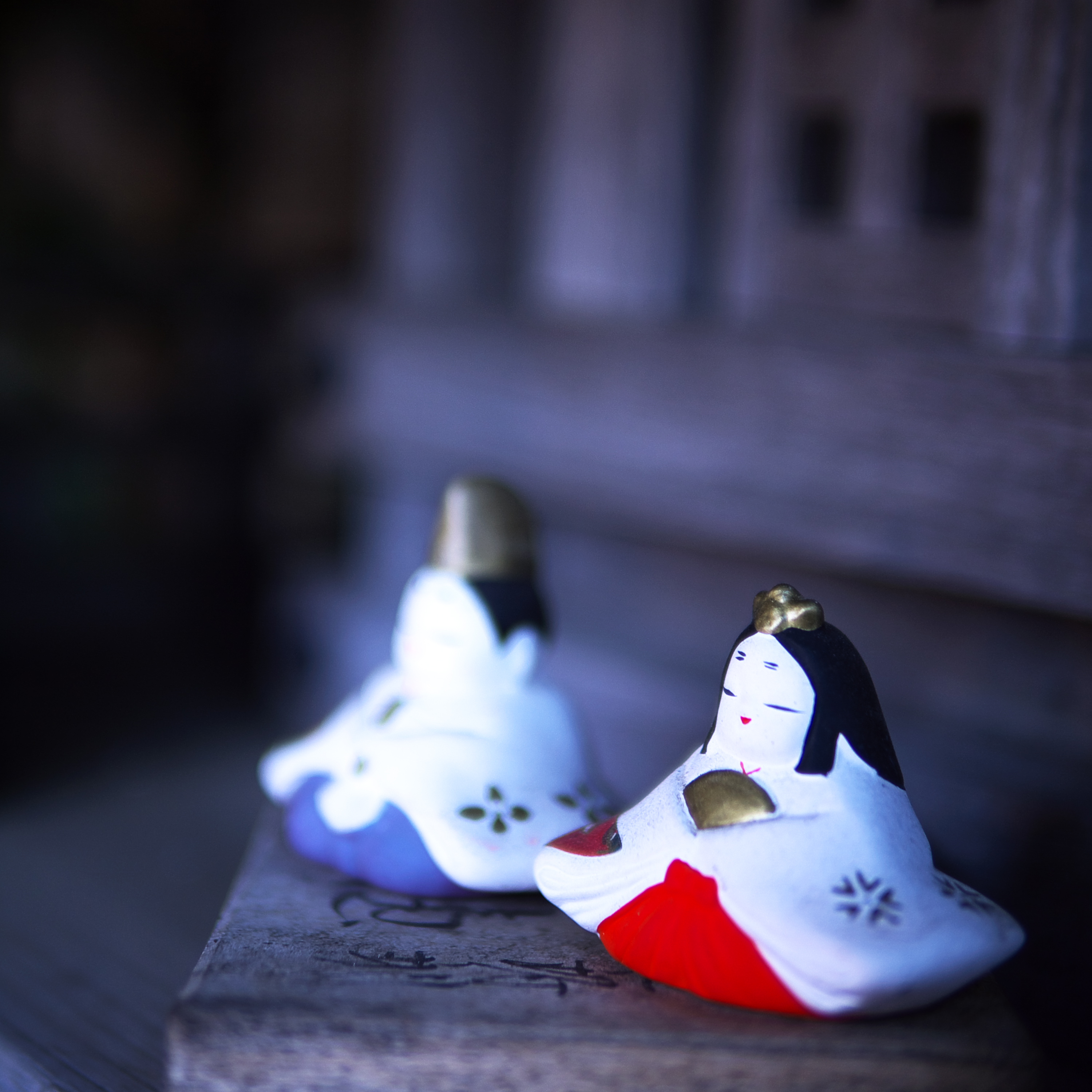
Katashiro used in Hinamatsuri

A katashiro (形代) is a kind of yorishiro where a kami is said to enter which has a human form. In Shinto rituals and folk customs, dolls are used as human substitutes to transfer sins and impurities during exorcisms. They are usually made of paper or thin boards. After the exorcism, they are thrown into the river or sea, or burned. During Hinamatsuri in March, people use these dolls as nademono (撫で物) to stroke the parts of their bodies that are not in good shape, and then cast them into the river or sea to pray for the growth of their children.

== History ==
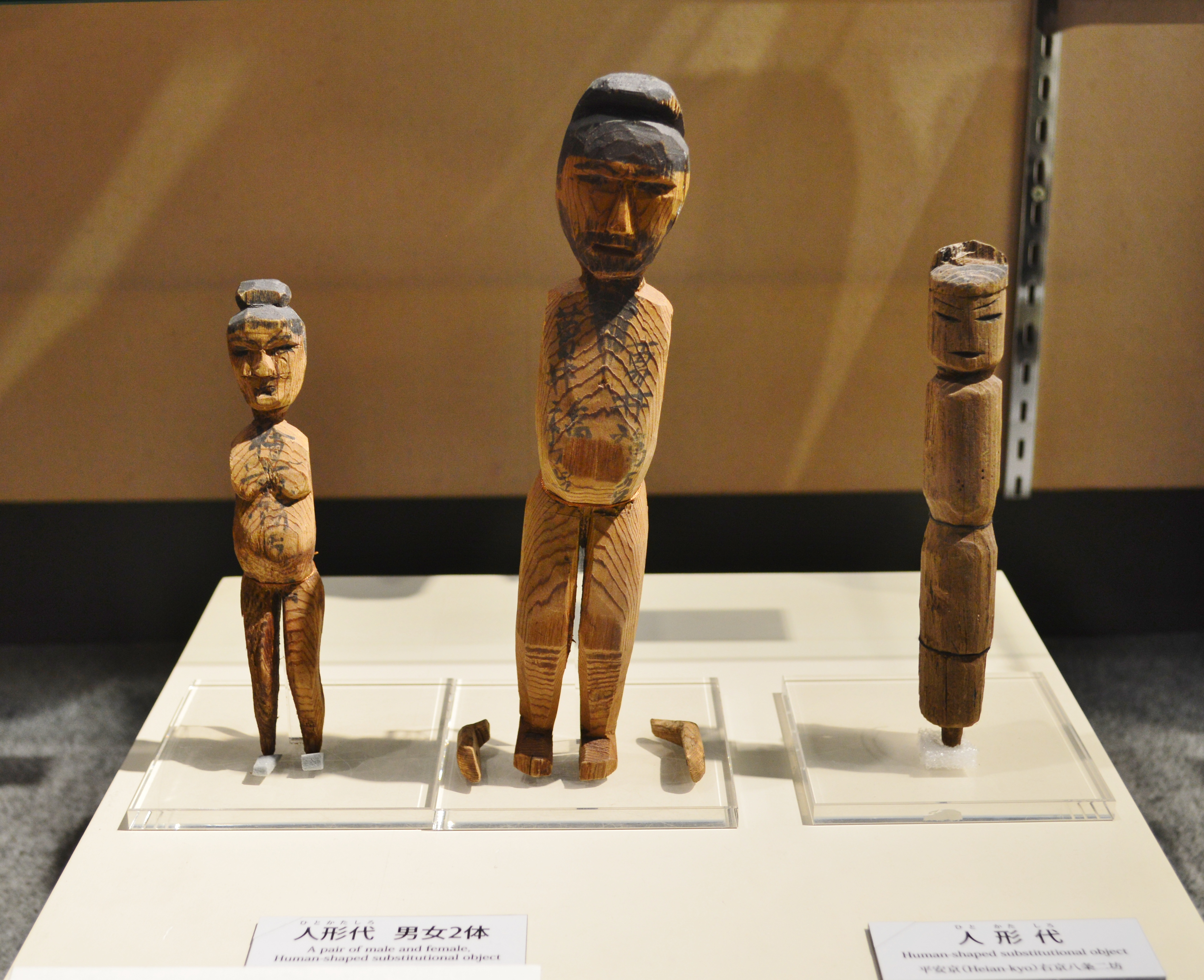
Katashiro from the Heian period located in Kyoto City Archaeological Museum

Katashiro is said to have existed since Ancient times, and has been found in Dogu from the Jōmon period, human-faced earthenware from the Yayoi period, and human haniwa from the Kofun period. Since they were to be flushed with water, plants and trees were used as materials. In Japan, from ancient times to the present, an event called "Oharai", which is described in Kojiki and Enki-Shiki, has been held at Shinto shrines all over Japan. In this event, people blow on the dolls distributed by the shrine and stroke the parts of the body that are not in good shape to remove impurities, and then throw them into the river or sea. This act of "letting go" is later associated with wish-fulfillment, and is sometimes linked to the Tanabata Festival held at the same time, when tanzaku (short strips of paper) are leaked. The burning of dolls, strips of paper, and bamboo is partly performed, but this is an event derived from Donton-yaki and Esoteric Buddhism, and is thought to have been mixed in with Shinbutsu-shūgō.

== Remnants ==
Today's "Nagashi-bina" and "Tanabata-bina" are said to be remnants of Katashiro.

== See also ==
- Amulet
- Hinamatsuri
- Hōko (doll)
- Straw dog
- Yorishiro
