= Bánh lá =

Stuffed leaf cake

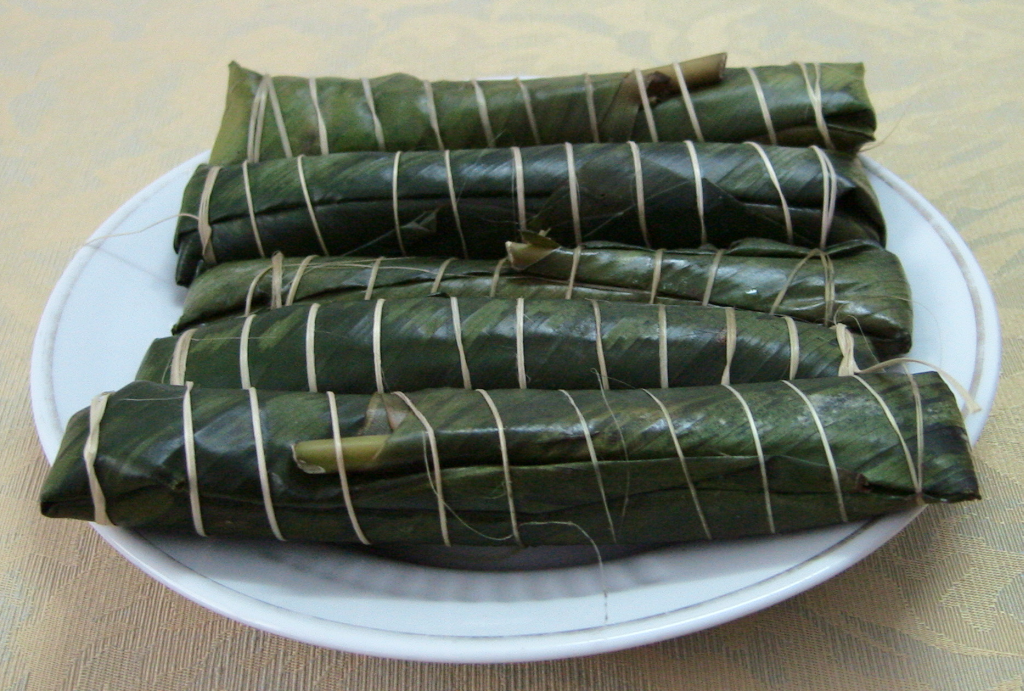
- A plate of cooked bánh tẻ, wrapped with Phrynium placentarium leaves, before being unwrapped for eating
- Type: Bánh or dumpling
- Place of origin: Vietnam
- Region or state: Southeast Asia
- Associated cuisine: Vietnam
- Main ingredients: Rice

A bánh ít wrapped in banana leaf

Bánh lá (/bǎɲ lǎ/), literally meaning "leaf cake", is a category of bánh, or Vietnamese cakes, that consist of a parcel of a variety of rice stuffed with some fillings and wrapped in a leaf or leaves.

== Varieties ==
- Bánh bột lọc – cassava cake packed with shrimp
- Bánh chưng – made from glutinous rice, mung beans, pork
- Bánh dừa – glutinous rice mixed with black bean paste cooked in coconut juice, wrapped in coconut leaf. The filling can be mung bean stir-fried in coconut juice or banana.
- Bánh gai – made from the leaves of the gai tree (Boehmeria nivea) dried, boiled, ground into small pieces, then mixed with glutinous rice, wrapped in banana leaf. The filling is made from a mixture of coconut, mung bean, peanuts, winter melon, sesames, and lotus seeds.
- Bánh giầy – white, flat, round glutinous rice cake with tough, chewy texture filled with mung bean or served with Vietnamese sausage (giò lụa)
- Bánh giò – pyramid-shaped rice dough dumplings filled with pork, shallot, and wood ear mushroom wrapped in banana leaf
- Bánh ít
  - Bánh ít lá gai – triangular dumpling wrapped in ramie leaf, similar to Chinese zongzi
  - Bánh ít tro – used in the Dragon Boat Festival (Vietnamese: Tết Đoan Ngọ).
- Bánh khoái
- Bánh nậm – flat rice-flour dumpling from Hue, wrapped in a banana leaf
- Bánh nếp
- Bánh phu thê – literally "husband and wife cake"; a sweet cake made of rice or tapioca flour and gelatin, filled with mung bean paste; also spelled bánh xu xê)
- Bánh tẻ
- Bánh răng bừa
- Bánh tét
- Bánh tro and bánh ú used in the Dragon Boat Festival (Vietnamese: Tết Đoan Ngọ).
