= Realgar wine =

Chinese alcoholic drink

- Traditional Chinese: 雄黃酒
- Simplified Chinese: 雄黄酒
- Literal meaning: yang-yellow wine
Transcriptions
Standard Mandarin
- Hanyu Pinyin: xiónghuáng jiǔ
Yue: Cantonese
- Jyutping: hung4 wong4 zau2
Southern Min
- Hokkien POJ: hiông-hông-chiú

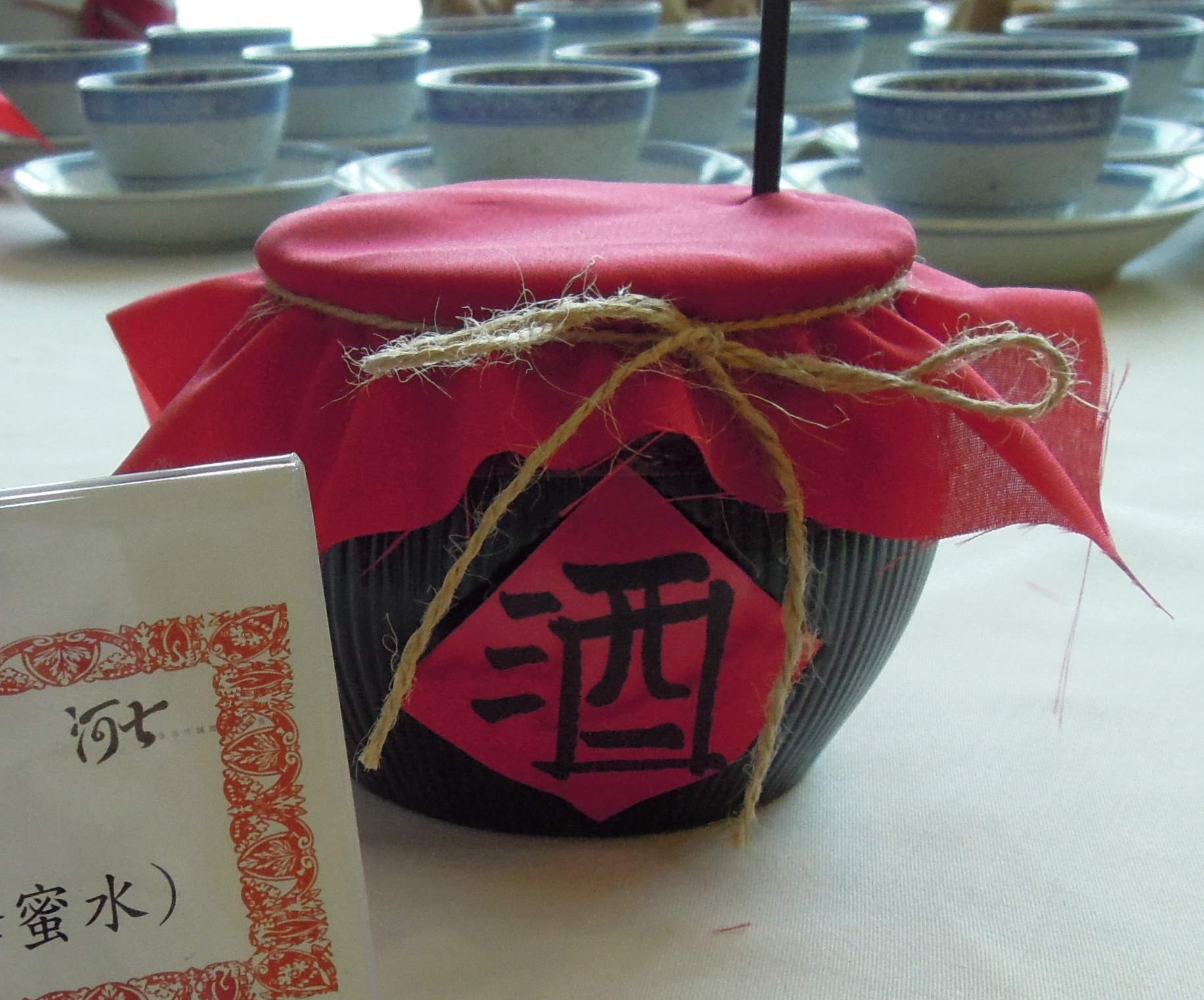

Realgar wine or Xionghuang wine (Chinese: 雄黃酒) is a Chinese alcoholic drink that consists of huangjiu ("yellow wine") dosed with powdered realgar (As_{4}S_{4}), a yellow-orange arsenic sulfide mineral. It is traditionally consumed as part of the Dragon Boat Festival at the height of summer.

== Tradition ==
Realgar solution has been sprinkled around the house as a repellent against snakes and insects since ancient times. In this sense, realgar was considered to be a universal antidote against poison by traditional Chinese medicine, which therefore advocated its use for protection against disease, snakes, and evil spirits. The Dragon Boat Festival coincides with what Chinese astronomy considers the height of summer and yang's force for the year. Adults were advised to consume huangjiu (as alcohol is considered yin) dosed with realgar powder; children too young to consume alcohol would wear an amulet containing realgar or have a 王 ("king") drawn on their forehead or chest with realgar slurry left over from the production of the wine to protect them.

These practices were later connected with the festivities honoring poet and statesman Qu Yuan (340–278 BC), who killed himself in protest by drowning in a river. According to legend, locals rushed in boats to save him or preserve his body from being eaten by the fish. A doctor among them is said to have cast realgar into the river, drawing out an aquatic dragon which the boatmen promptly killed.

== Preparation ==
Realgar wine can be bought ready-made, but it is often prepared from homemade yellow wine and realgar mineral powder bought from drugstores, markets, or street vendors. A typical recipe calls for 50 to 100 grams of realgar powder to be added to one liter of homemade wine and left to stand at room temperature for several hours.

== Health risks ==
Although practiced for many centuries, the drinking of realgar wine and the painting of children with realgar have come under scrutiny in modern times. Pure realgar by itself has low toxicity when ingested since its poor solubility hampers its absorption in the gastrointestinal tract, but the minerals used in realgar wine may contain substantial amounts of other inorganic arsenic compounds, such as arsenate and arsenite, which can be absorbed by the body. Arsenic is a potent poison and a causal factor in urinary bladder, skin, liver, and lung cancers. There have been a number of poisonings associated with realgar ingestion.

Samples of realgar wine have been found to contain 70 to 400 mg of dissolved arsenic compounds per liter (compared to less than 0.003 mg/L in the homemade wine itself), mostly as arsenite and arsenate: more than a thousand times the maximum concentration of arsenic legally allowed in commercial liquor. The concentration of dissolved arsenic decreases as ethanol content increases. Consumption of 200 mL of the realgar wine containing 70 mg arsenic compounds per liter resulted in a substantial increase of arsenic levels in urine, to 200 μg/L. Levels of ≥80 μg/L were observed in the urine of children who had their faces painted with realgar slurry, indicating absorption through the skin.

== See also ==
- Cold-Food Powder, an ancient Chinese drug containing realgar
