= Miluo =

Miluo may refer to the following in southern China:

- Miluo City (汨罗市), county-level city of Yueyang, Hunan
- Miluo River (汨罗江), in Jiangxi and Hunan
