= Qu Yuan =

Chinese poet (c.340–278 BCE)

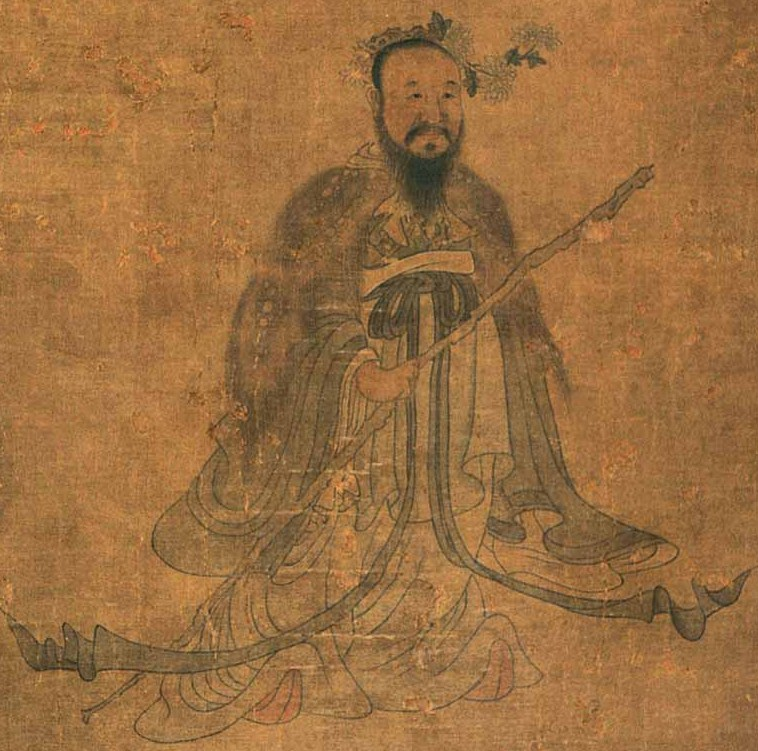
- Portrait of Qu Yuan by Chen Hongshou, 17th century
- Born: c. 339 BC; State of Chu (location disputed)
- Died: 278 BC; Miluo River (traditional account)
- Occupations: Poet, politician

Chinese name
- Chinese: 屈原
Transcriptions
Standard Mandarin
- Hanyu Pinyin: Qū Yuán
- Wade–Giles: Ch'ü^{1} Yüan^{2}
- IPA: [tɕʰý ɥɛ̌n]
Wu
- Suzhounese: Chiuq^{7} Gnioe^{2}
Yue: Cantonese
- Yale Romanization: Wāt Yùhn
- Jyutping: Wat^{1} Jyun^{4}
- IPA: [wɐt̚˥ jyn˩]
Southern Min
- Hokkien POJ: Khut Goân
- Tâi-lô: Khut Guân
Old Chinese
- Baxter–Sagart (2014): *kʰut N-ɢʷar

Qu Yuan (c. 340 BC – 278 BC) was a Chinese poet and political figure of the State of Chu during the Warring States period.

The surviving evidence for his life is limited. The earliest known reference to Qu Yuan is Jia Yi's "Diao Qu Yuan Fu" ("Lament for Qu Yuan"), written in 174 BC. The first systematic biography appears in Sima Qian's Records of the Grand Historian, although it contains contradictory details.

Qu Yuan is the central figure associated with the Chu Ci anthology. "The Lament" is generally accepted as his work, while the attribution of many other poems has been disputed. Later tradition associates his death by drowning in the Miluo River with customs of the Dragon Boat Festival.

== Life ==
The only surviving source of information on Qu Yuan's life is Sima Qian's biography of him in Shiji, although the biography is circumstantial and probably influenced greatly by Sima's own identification with Qu. Sima wrote that Qu was a member of the Chu royal clan and served as an official under King Huai of Chu (reigned 328–299 BC).

During the early days of King Huai's reign, Qu Yuan was serving the State of Chu as its Left Minister. However, King Huai exiled Qu Yuan to the region north of the Han River, because corrupt ministers slandered him and influenced the king. Eventually, Qu Yuan was reinstated and sent on a diplomatic mission to the State of Qi. He tried to resume relations between Chu and Qi, which King Huai had broken under the false pretense of King Hui of Qin to cede territory near Shangyu.

During King Qingxiang's reign, Prime Minister Zilan slandered Qu Yuan. This caused Qu Yuan's exile to the regions south of the Yangtze River. It is said that Qu Yuan returned first to his home town. In his exile, he spent much of this time collecting legends and rearranging folk odes while traveling the countryside. Furthermore, he wrote some of the greatest poetry in Chinese literature and expressed deep concerns about his state. According to legend, his anxiety brought him to an increasingly troubled state of health. During his depression, he would often take walks near a certain well to look upon his thin and gaunt reflection in the water. This well became known as the "Face Reflection Well." On a hillside in Xiangluping (at present-day Zigui County, Hubei Province), there is a well that is considered to be the original well from the time of Qu Yuan.

In 278 BC, learning of the capture of his country's capital, Ying, by General Bai Qi of the state of Qin, Qu Yuan is said to have collected folktales and written the lengthy poem of lamentation called Lament for Ying. Eventually, he died by suicide, wading into the Miluo River in today's Hunan Province while holding a rock. Why he chose death was argued by Chinese scholars for centuries. Typical explanations included martyrdom for his beloved but falling motherland – suggested by Song dynasty philosopher Zhu Xi – or extreme despair of the political situation in Chu, realizing his lifelong political dream would never be achieved. But according to Yu Fu, widely considered to be written by Qu himself or a person very familiar with him, suicide was an ultimate way to protect his innocence and life principles.

According to Li Yinhe, Qu Yuan is said to have expressed his love for the ruling monarch, King Huai of Chu, through several of his works, including the Li Sao and Longing for Beauty.

== Legacy ==
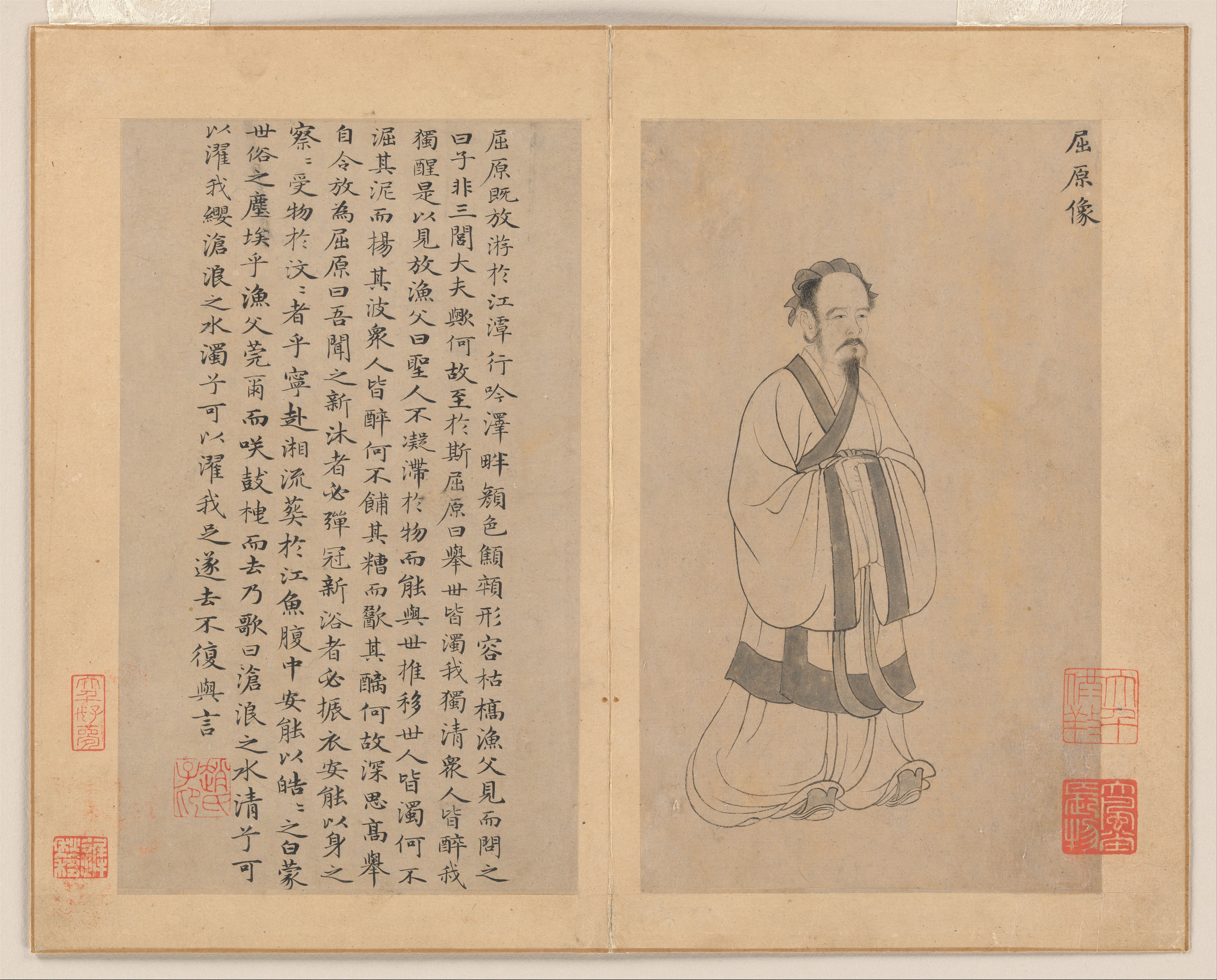
Qu Yuan as depicted in the Nine Songs, imprint of presumably the 14th century (Metropolitan Museum of Art)

Qu Yuan is regarded as the first author of verse in China to have his name associated to his work, since prior to that time, poetic works were not attributed to any specific authors. He is considered to have initiated the so-called sao style of verse, which is named after his work Li Sao, in which he abandoned the classic four-character verses used in poems of Shi Jing and adopted verses with varying lengths. This resulted in poems with more rhythm and latitude in expression. Qu Yuan is also regarded as one of the most prominent figures of Romanticism in Chinese classical literature, and his masterpieces influenced some of the great Romanticist poets in the Tang dynasty. During the Han dynasty, Qu Yuan became established as a heroic example of model behaviour for a scholar-official denied public recognition suitable to their worth.

=== Chu Ci ===
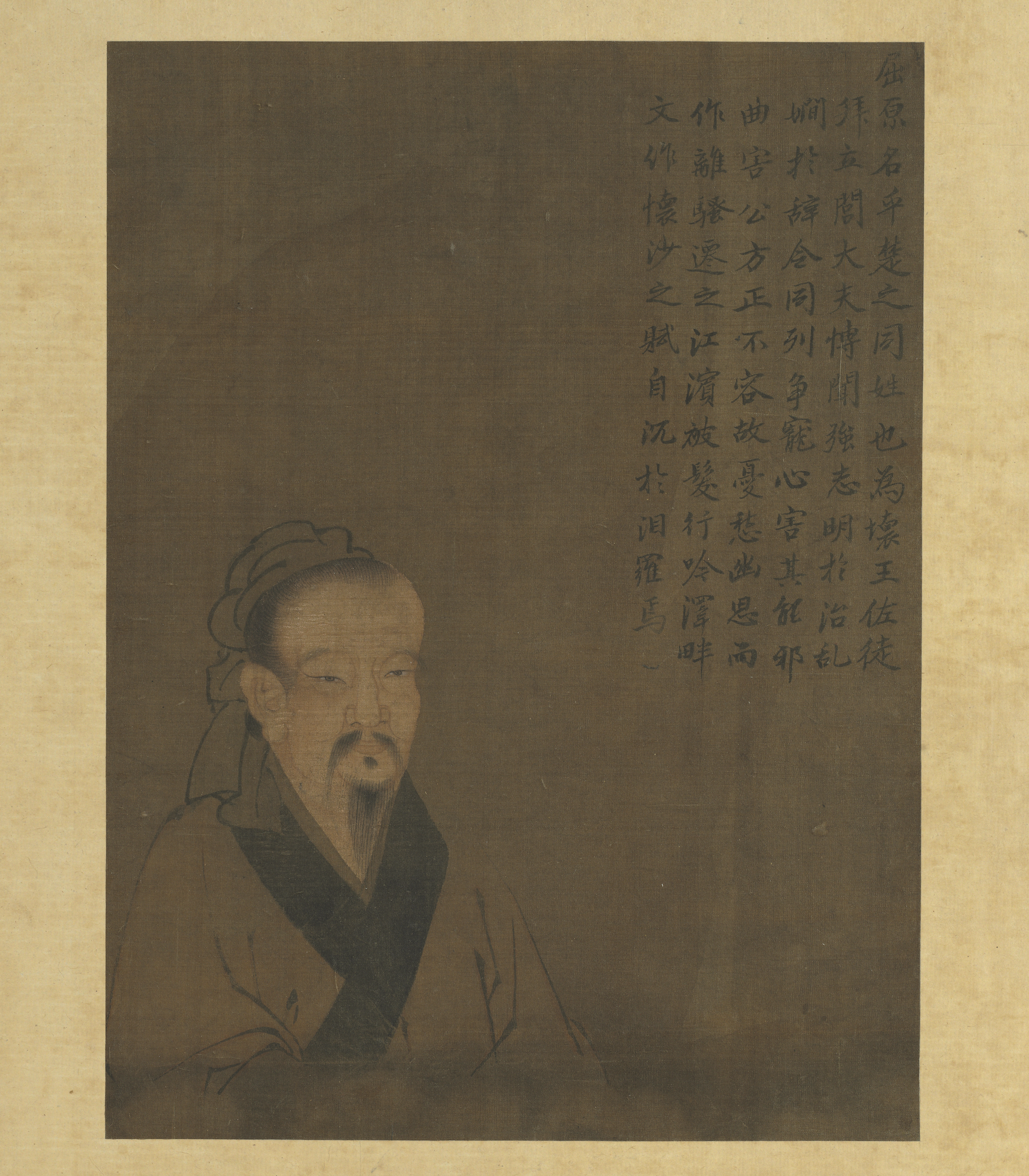
Portrait of Qu Yuan (National Palace Museum)

Chu was located in what is now the Yangzi River area of central China. At this time, Chu represented the southern fringe of the Chinese cultural area, having been at times an ally, opponent, or subunit of the Shang and Zhou kingdoms. However, the Chu culture also retained certain characteristics of local traditions such as shamanism, the influence of which can be seen in the Chu Ci.

The Chu Ci was compiled and annotated by Wang Yi (died AD 158), and is the source of transmission of these poems and any reliable information about them to subsequent times; thus, the role which Qu Yuan had in the authoring, editing, or retouching of these works remains unclear. The Chu Ci poems are important as being direct precursors of the fu style of Han dynasty literature. The Chu Ci, as a preservation of early literature, has provided invaluable data for linguistic research into the history of the Chinese language, from Chen Di on.

=== Religion ===
Following his suicide, Qu Yuan was sometimes revered as a water god, including by Taiwanese Taoists, who number him among the Kings of the Water Immortals.

=== Patriotism ===
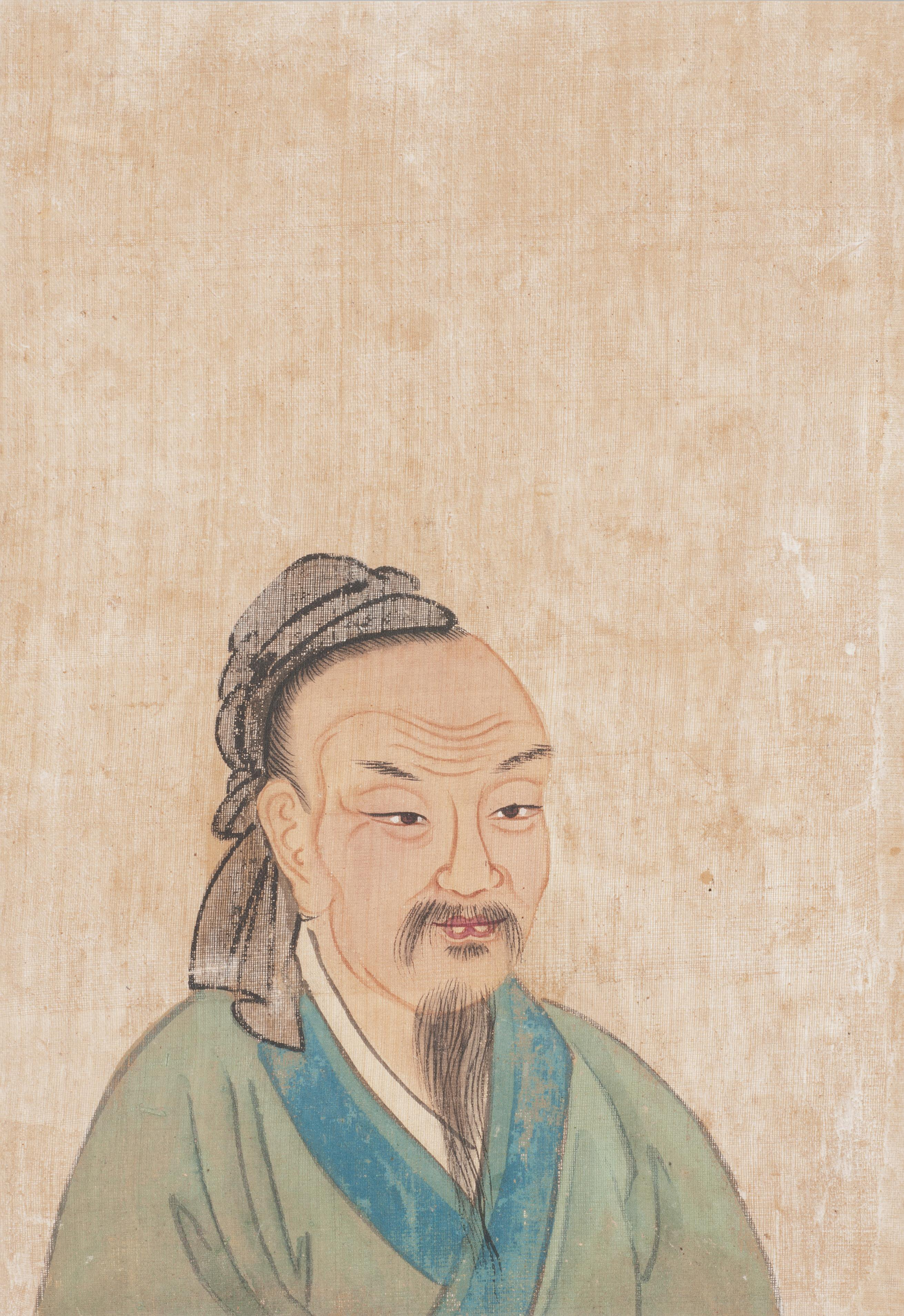
As depicted in the album Portraits of Famous Men, c. 1900 (Philadelphia Museum of Art)

Qu Yuan began to be treated in a nationalist way as "China's first patriotic poet" during World War II. Wen Yiduo—a socialist poet and scholar later executed by the Chinese Nationalist Party—wrote in his Mythology & Poetry that, "although Qu Yuan did not write about the life of the people or voice their sufferings, he may truthfully be said to have acted as the leader of a people's revolution and to have struck a blow to avenge them. Qu Yuan is the only person in the whole of Chinese history who is fully entitled to be called 'the people's poet'." Guo Moruo's 1942 play Qu Yuan gave him similar treatment, drawing parallels to Hamlet and King Lear. Their view of Qu's social idealism and unbending patriotism became canonical under the People's Republic of China after the 1949 Communist victory in the Chinese Civil War. For example, one high-school Chinese textbook from 1957 began with the sentence "Qu Yuan was the first great patriotic poet in the history of our country's literature". This cult status increased Qu Yuan's position within China's literary canon, seeing him placed on postage stamps and the Dragon Boat Festival elevated to a national public holiday in 2008. It has, however, come at the expense of more the critical scholarly appraisals of Qu Yuan's historicity and alleged body of work that had developed during the late Qing and early Republic.

=== Dragon Boat Festival ===
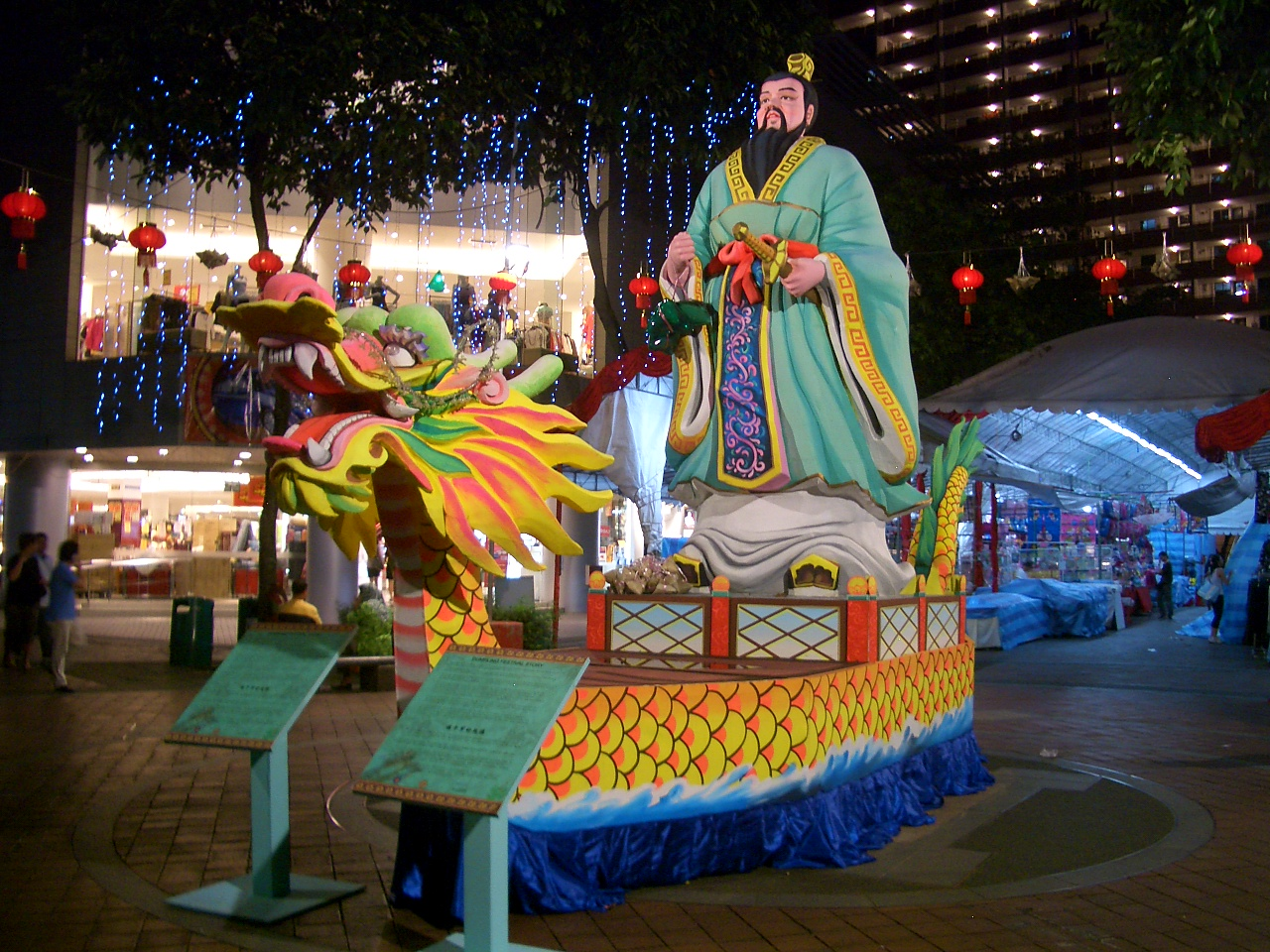
Statue of Qu Yuan on a dragon boat, on display for the Dragon Boat Festival in Singapore

Popular legend has it that villagers carried their dumplings and boats to the middle of the river and desperately tried to save Qu Yuan after he immersed himself in the Miluo but were too late to do so. However, in order to keep fish and evil spirits away from his body, they beat drums and splashed the water with their paddles, and they also threw rice into the water both as a food offering to Qu Yuan's spirit and also to distract the fish away from his body. However, the legend continues, that late one night, the spirit of Qu Yuan appeared before his friends and told them that he died because he had taken himself under the river. Then, he asked his friends to wrap their rice into three-cornered silk packages to ward off the dragon.

These packages became a traditional food known as zongzi, although the lumps of rice are now wrapped in leaves instead of silk. The act of racing to search for his body in boats gradually became the cultural tradition of dragon boat racing, held on the anniversary of his death every year. Today, people still eat zongzi and participate in dragon boat races to commemorate Qu Yuan's sacrifice on the fifth day of the fifth month of the traditional lunisolar Chinese calendar. Countries within the Sinosphere also celebrate variations of the Dragon Boat Festival, namely Tango no sekku in Japan, Dano in Korea, and Tết Đoan Ngọ in Vietnam.

=== Space exploration ===
Qu's poem Heavenly Questions (Tianwen) addressed ontological questions regarding the origins of the universe and the mysteries of heaven and earth. China's interplanetary exploration program, Tianwen (Heavenly Questions) is named after the poem. The first mission to Mars, Tianwen-1, was launched on July 23, 2020, and reached Mars on February 10, 2021. On Mar 14, 2021, the lander and rover successfully landed on the surface of Mars.

== See also ==
- Jiu Ge
- Classical Chinese poetry
- Tianwen
- Song Yu
- Dragon Boat Festival
- Tianwen-1
- Qu (surname 屈)
- Shun Li and the Poet (Qu Yuan serves as Shun Li's inspiration)
