= Dragon Boat Festival =

Chinese holiday

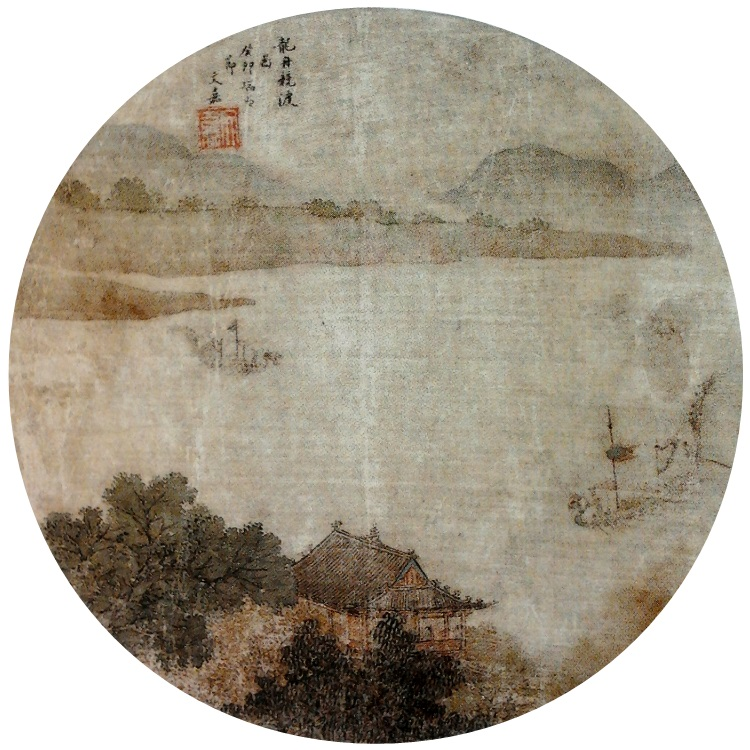
- Dragon Boat Festival (18th century)
- Observed by: Chinese
- Type: Cultural
- Observances: Dragon boat racing, consumption of realgar wine and zongzi
- Date: Fifth day of the fifth month of the Chinese lunisolar calendar
- 2025 date: 31 May
- 2026 date: 19 June
- 2027 date: 9 June
- 2028 date: 28 May
- Frequency: Annual
- Related to: Tango no sekku, Dano, Tết Đoan Ngọ, Yukka Nu Hii

Dragon Boat Festival
- UNESCO Intangible Cultural Heritage
- Country: China
- Reference: 225
- Region: Asia and the Pacific

Inscription history
- Inscription: 2009 (4th session)
- List: Representative
- UNESCO Cultural Heritage

Gangneung Danoje Festival
- UNESCO Intangible Cultural Heritage
- Country: Korea
- Reference: 114
- Region: Asia and the Pacific

Inscription history
- Inscription: 2008

Chinese name
- Simplified Chinese: 端午节
- Traditional Chinese: 端午節
- Literal meaning: Midyear festival
Transcriptions
Standard Mandarin
- Hanyu Pinyin: Duānwǔ jié
- Wade–Giles: Tuan^{1}-wu^{3} chieh^{2}
- IPA: [twán.ù tɕjě]
Yue: Cantonese
- Yale Romanization: Dyūn ńgh jit
- Jyutping: Dyun^{1} Ng^{5} Zit^{3}
- IPA: [tyn˥.ŋ tsit̚˧]
Southern Min
- Hokkien POJ: Toan-ngó͘-cheh; Toan-ngó͘-choeh; Toan-ngó͘-chiat

Dragon Boat Festival
- Simplified Chinese: 龙船节 / 龙舟节
- Traditional Chinese: 龍船節 / 龍舟節
Transcriptions
Standard Mandarin
- Hanyu Pinyin: Lóngchuánjié / Lóngzhōujié
- Wade–Giles: Lung^{2}-chʻuan^{2}-chieh^{2} / Lung^{2}-chou^{1}-chieh^{2}
- IPA: [lʊ̌ŋ.ʈʂʰwǎn.tɕjě] / [lʊ̌ŋ.ʈʂóʊ.tɕjě]

Double Fifth Festival; Fifth Month Festival; Fifth Day Festival
- Simplified Chinese: 重五节 / 双五节
- Traditional Chinese: 重五節 / 雙五節; 五月節; 五日節
Transcriptions
Southern Min
- Hokkien POJ: Gō͘-go̍eh-cheh / Gō͘-ge̍h-choeh; Gō͘-ji̍t-cheh / Gō͘-li̍t-choeh

Dumpling Festival
- Simplified Chinese: 肉粽节
- Traditional Chinese: 肉糭節
- Literal meaning: Meat zongzi festival
Transcriptions
Southern Min
- Hokkien POJ: Bah-chàng-cheh / Bah-chàng-choeh

Portuguese name
- Portuguese: Festividade do Barco-Dragão

The Dragon Boat Festival (traditional Chinese: 端午節; simplified Chinese: 端午节; pinyin: Duānwǔ jié; Cantonese Yale: Dyūnńgh jit (Note: In Cantonese, it is romanized as Tuen^{1} Ng^{5} Jit^{3} in Hong Kong and Tung^{1} Ng^{5} Jit^{3} in Macau, hence the name "Tuen Ng Festival" used in Hong Kong, and Tun Ng (Festividade do Barco-Dragão in Portuguese) in Macau.)), also known as the Duanwu Festival or Tuen Ng Festival, is a traditional Chinese holiday that occurs on the fifth day of the fifth month of the Chinese calendar, which corresponds to late May or early June in the Gregorian calendar. The holiday commemorates Qu Yuan who was the beloved prime minister of the southern Chinese state of Chu during the Warring States period, about 600 B.C. to 200 B.C., and is celebrated by holding dragon boat races and eating sticky rice dumplings called zongzi, which were southern Chinese traditions. The Dragon Boat Festival integrates praying for good luck and taking respite from the summer heat.

In September 2009, UNESCO officially approved the holiday's inclusion in the Representative List of the Intangible Cultural Heritage of Humanity, becoming the first Chinese holiday to be selected.

== Names ==
Other than "Dragon Boat Festival", used as the official English translation of the holiday by the People's Republic of China, and "Tuen Ng Festival", as used by Hong Kong as the official English name, it is also referred to in some English sources as Double Fifth Festival which alludes to the day of the festival according to the Chinese calendar.

The Chinese name of the festival is pronounced differently in different Chinese languages. Duanwu (端午) literally means 'starting five'—i.e., the first "fifth day" of the month according to the Chinese zodiac. (Note: Also suggested to mean "Beginning of Noon", or "High Noon Festival", since "horse" also marks the hours 11:00–13:00 each day.) However, despite the literal meaning referring to the Earthly Branches, this character has also become associated with wǔ (五; wu^{3}; 'five'), due to the characters often having the same pronunciation. Hence Duanwu, the festival on "the fifth day of the fifth month".

== History ==
=== Origin ===
The fifth lunisolar month is considered an unlucky and poisonous month, and the fifth day of the fifth month especially so. To get rid of the misfortune, people would put calamus, Artemisia, and garlic above the doors on the fifth day of the fifth month. These were believed to help ward off evil by their strong smell and their shape (for instance, calamus leaves are shaped like swords).

Venomous animals were said to appear starting from the fifth day of the fifth month, such as snakes, centipedes, and scorpions; people also supposedly get sick easily after this day. Therefore, during the Dragon Boat Festival, people try to avoid this bad luck. For example, people may put pictures of the five venomous creatures (snake, centipede, scorpion, lizard, toad, and sometimes spider) on the wall and stick needles in them. People may also make paper cutouts of the five creatures and wrap them around the wrists of their children. Big ceremonies and performances developed from these practices in many areas, making the Dragon Boat Festival a day for getting rid of disease and bad luck.

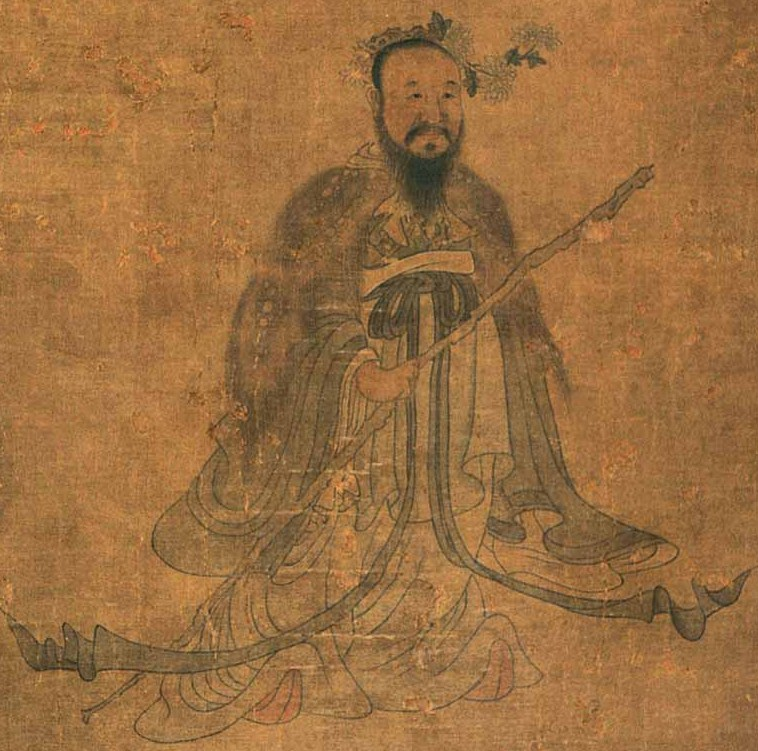
17th century depiction of Qu Yuan

=== Qu Yuan ===
The story best known in modern China holds that the festival commemorates the death of the poet and minister Qu Yuan (c. 340–278 BC) of the ancient state of Chu during the Warring States period of the Zhou dynasty. A cadet member of the Chu royal house, Qu served in high offices. However, when the king decided to ally with the increasingly powerful state of Qin, Qu was banished for opposing the alliance and even accused of treason. During his exile, Qu Yuan wrote a great deal of poetry. Eventually, Qin captured Ying, the Chu capital. In despair, Qu Yuan committed suicide by drowning himself in the Miluo River.

It is said that the local people, who admired him, raced out in their boats to save him, or at least retrieve his body. This is said to have been the origin of dragon boat races. When his body could not be found, they dropped balls of sticky rice into the river so that the fish would eat them instead of Qu Yuan's body. This is said to be the origin of zongzi.

During the twentieth century, Qu Yuan became considered a patriotic poet and a symbol of the people. He was promoted as a folk hero and a symbol of Chinese nationalism in the People's Republic of China after the 1949 Communist victory in the Chinese Civil War. The historian and writer Guo Moruo was influential in shaping this view of Qu.

=== Wu Zixu ===
Another origin story says that the festival commemorates Wu Zixu (died 484 BC), a statesman of the Kingdom of Wu. King Goujian of the state of Yue sends Xi Shi, a beautiful woman, to the state of Wu to distract its King Fuchai from state affairs. Wu Zixu sees through the plot and warned Fuchai, who became angry and forced the latter to commit suicide. His body was thrown into the river on the fifth day of the fifth month. After his death, in places such as Suzhou, Wu Zixu is remembered during the Dragon Boat Festival.

=== Cao E ===
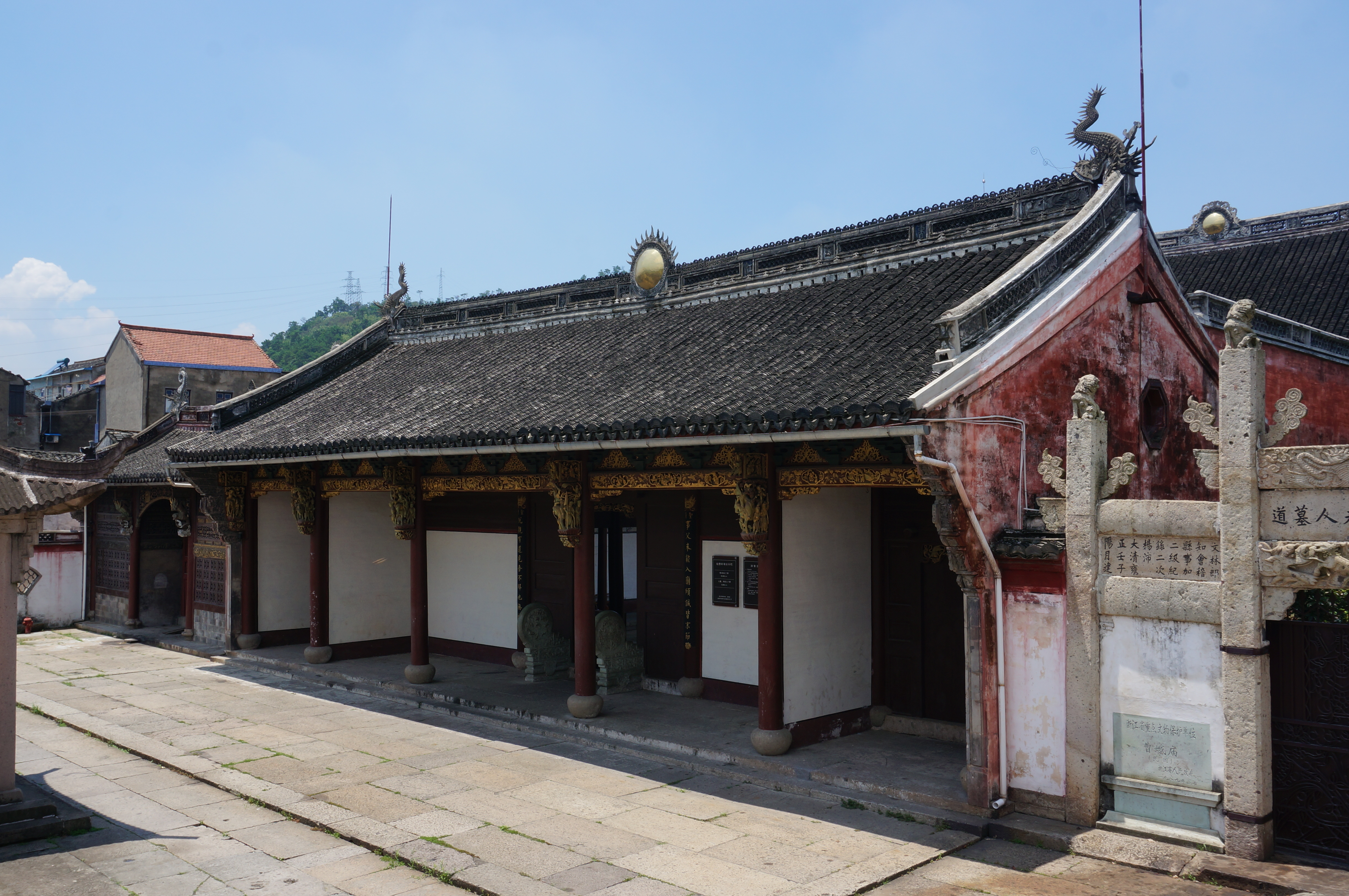
The front of the Cao E Temple, facing east, toward the Cao'e River in Shangyu, Zhejiang

Although Wu Zixu is commemorated in southeast Jiangsu and Qu Yuan elsewhere in China, much of Northeastern Zhejiang, including the cities of Shaoxing, Ningbo and Zhoushan, celebrates the memory of the young girl Cao E (130–144 AD) instead. Cao E's father Cao Xu (曹盱) was a shaman who presided over local ceremonies at Shangyu. In 143, while presiding over a ceremony commemorating Wu Zixu during the Dragon Boat Festival, Cao Xu accidentally fell into the Shun River. Cao E, in an act of filial piety, searched the river for 3 days trying to find him. After five days, she and her father were both found dead in the river from drowning. Eight years later, in 151, a temple was built in Shangyu dedicated to the memory of Cao E and her sacrifice. The Shun River was renamed Cao'e River in her honor.

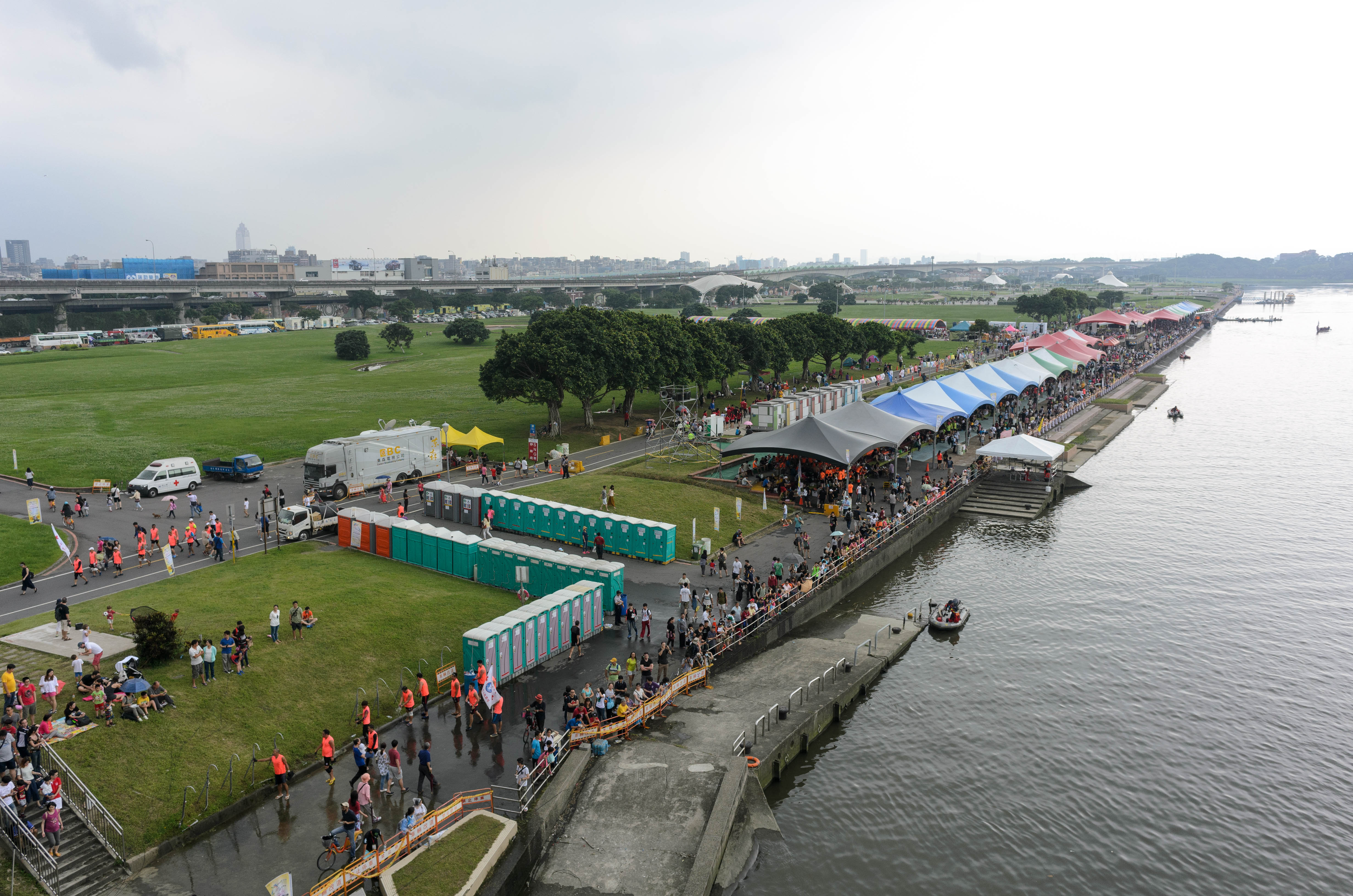
Dragon boat races at Dajia Riverside Park in Taipei

Cao E is depicted in the Wu Shuang Pu ("Table of Peerless Heroes") by Jin Guliang.

=== Pre-existing holiday ===
Some modern research suggests that the stories of Qu Yuan or Wu Zixu were possibly superimposed onto pre-existing holiday traditions. The promotion of these stories might have been encouraged by Confucian scholars, seeking to legitimize and strengthen their influence in China. The relationship between zongzi, Qu Yuan and the Dragon Boat Festival first appeared during the early Han dynasty.

The stories of both Qu Yuan and Wu Zixu were recorded in Sima Qian's Shiji, completed 187 and 393 years after the respective events, because historians wanted to praise both characters.

According to some, the holiday may have originated as a celebration of agriculture, fertility, and rice growing in southern China. As recently as 1952 the American sociologist Wolfram Eberhard wrote that it was more widely celebrated in southern China than in the north.

Another theory is that the Dragon Boat Festival originated from dragon worship. This theory was advanced by Wen Yiduo. Support is drawn from two key traditions of the festival: the tradition of dragon boat racing and zongzi. The food may have originally represented an offering to the dragon king, while dragon boat racing naturally reflects a reverence for the dragon and the active yang energy associated with it. This was merged with the tradition of visiting friends and family on boats.

Another suggestion is that the festival celebrates a widespread feature of east Asian agrarian societies: the harvest of winter wheat. Offerings were regularly made to deities and spirits at such times: in the ancient Yue, dragon kings; in the ancient Chu, Qu Yuan; in the ancient Wu, Wu Zixu (as a river god); in ancient Korea, mountain gods (see Dano). As interactions between different regions increased, these similar festivals eventually merged into one holiday.

=== Early 20th century ===
In the early 20th century the Dragon Boat Festival was observed from the first to the fifth days of the fifth month, and was also known as the Festival of Five Poisonous/Venomous Insects (traditional Chinese: 毒蟲節; simplified Chinese: 毒虫节; pinyin: Dúchóng jié; Wade–Giles: Tu^{2}-chʻung^{2}-chieh^{2}). Yu Der Ling writes in chapter 11 of her 1911 memoir Two Years in the Forbidden City:

The first day of the fifth moon was a busy day for us all, as from the first to the fifth of the fifth moon was the festival of five poisonous insects, which I will explain later—also called the Dragon Boat Festival. ... Now about this Feast. It is also called the Dragon Boat Feast. The fifth of the fifth moon at noon was the most poisonous hour for the poisonous insects, and reptiles such as frogs, lizards, snakes, hide in the mud, for that hour they are paralyzed. Some medical men search for them at that hour and place them in jars, and when they are dried, sometimes use them as medicine. Her Majesty told me this, so that day I went all over everywhere and dug into the ground, but found nothing.

=== 21st century ===
In 2005, the Chinese Communist Party called for the revival of the Dragon Boat Festival. In 2008, the Dragon Boat Festival was made a national public holiday in China.

== Public holiday ==
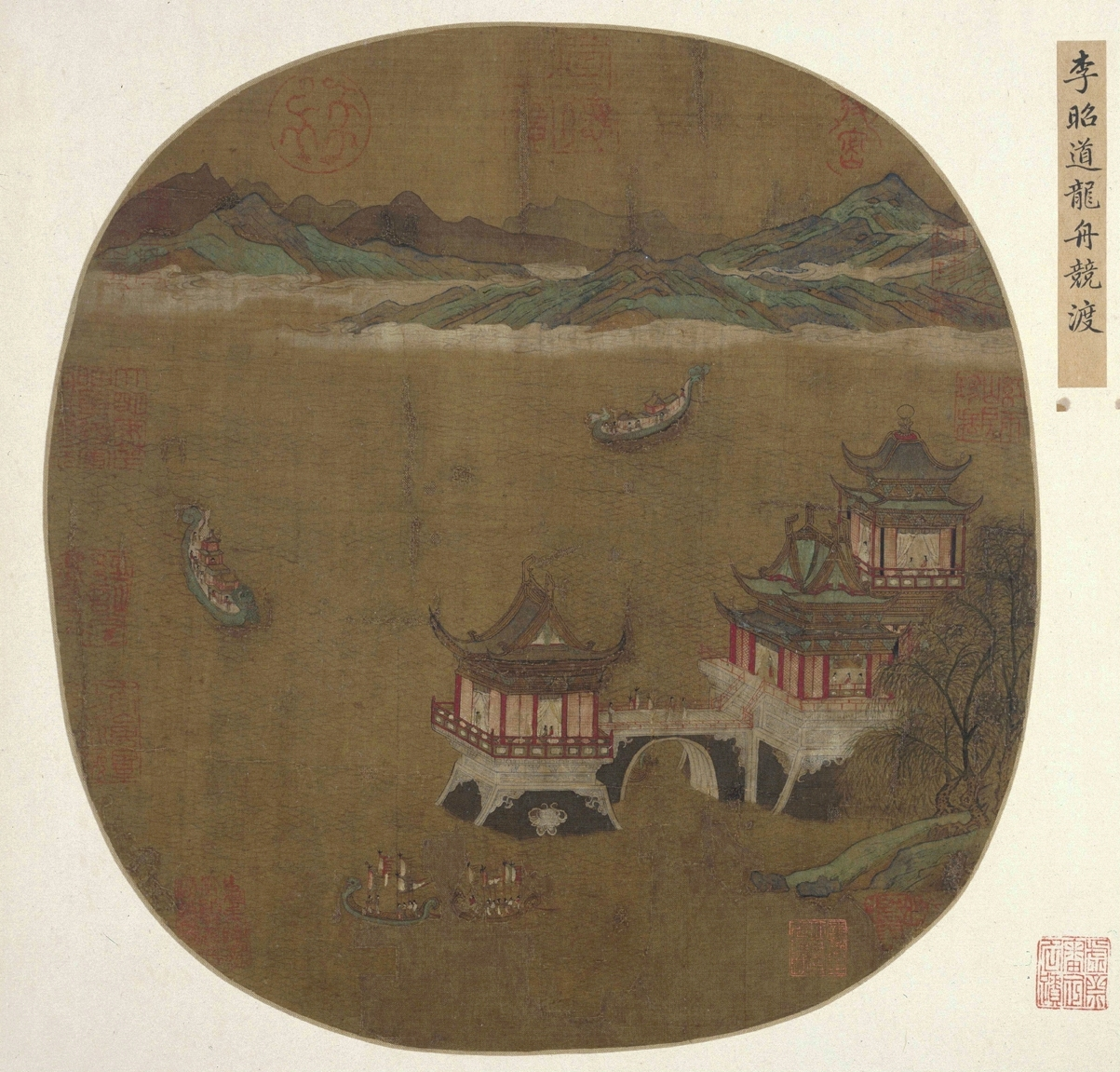
Dragon boat race by Li Zhaodao (675–758)

The festival was long marked as a cultural festival in China and is a public holiday in China, Hong Kong, Macau, and Taiwan. The People's Republic of China's government established in 1949 did not initially recognize the Dragon Boat Festival as a public holiday but reintroduced it in 2008 alongside two other festivals in a bid to boost traditional culture.

The Dragon Boat Festival is unofficially observed by the Chinese communities of Southeast Asia, including Singapore and Malaysia. In Singapore, each dialect group has its own unique style of rice dumplings, with different ingredients and wrapping methods that reflect a rich diversity of cultural flavors. Equivalent and related official festivals include the Korean Dano, Japanese Tango no sekku, and Vietnamese Tết Đoan Ngọ.

== Practices and activities ==
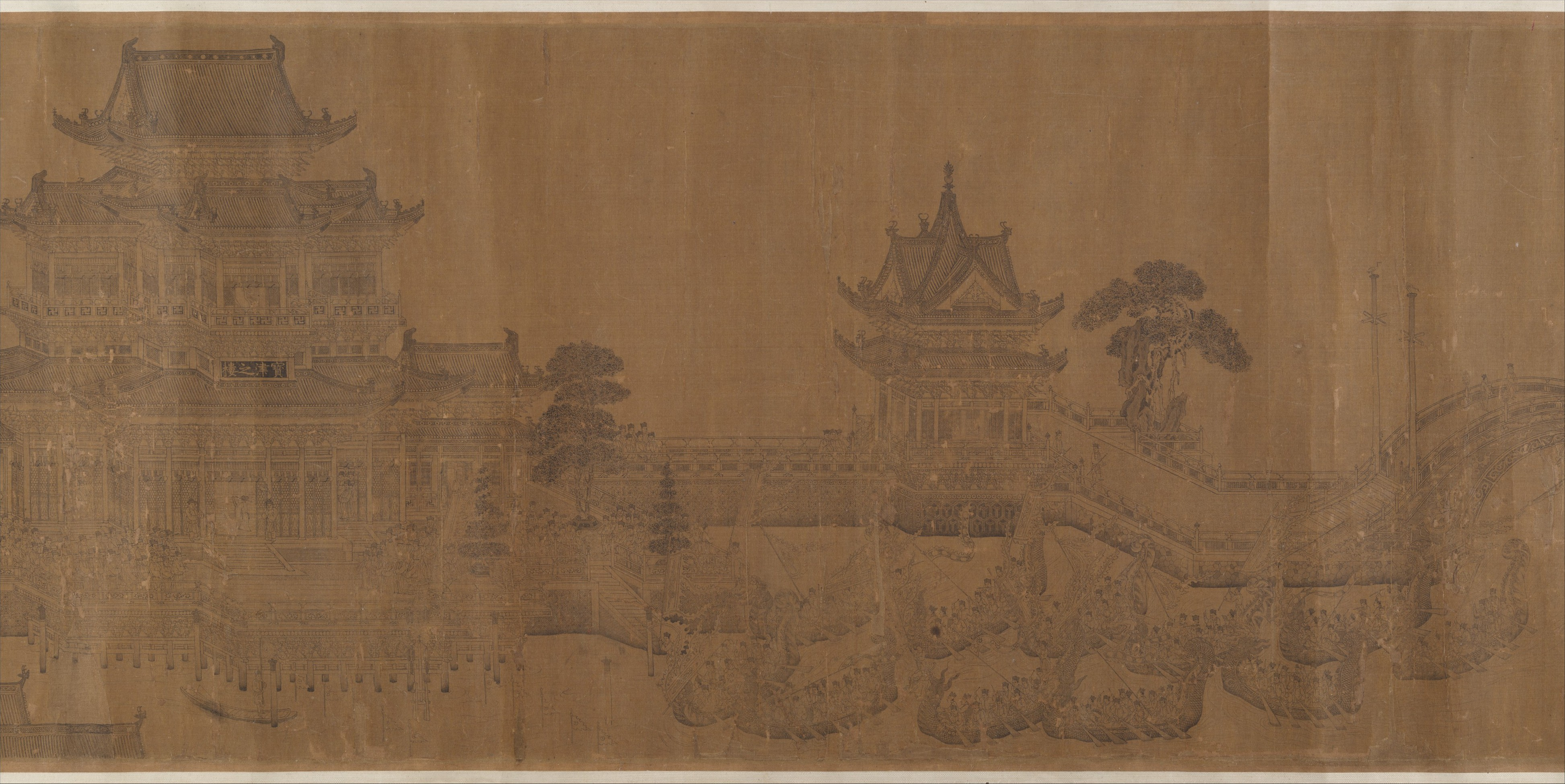
Section of Dragon Boat Regatta by Wang Zhenpeng (fl. 1275–1330)

Three of the most widespread activities conducted during the Dragon Boat Festival are eating (and preparing) zongzi, drinking realgar wine, and racing dragon boats.

=== Dragon boat racing ===
Dragon boat racing has a rich history of ancient ceremonial and ritualistic traditions, which originated in southern central China more than 2500 years ago. The legend starts with the story of Qu Yuan, who was a minister in one of the Warring State governments, Chu. He was slandered by jealous government officials and banished by the king. Out of disappointment in the Chu monarch, he drowned himself in the Miluo River. The common people rushed to the water and tried to recover his body, but they failed. In commemoration of Qu Yuan, people hold dragon boat races yearly on the day of his death according to the legend. They also scattered rice into the water to feed the fish, to prevent them from eating Qu Yuan's body, which is one of the origins of zongzi.

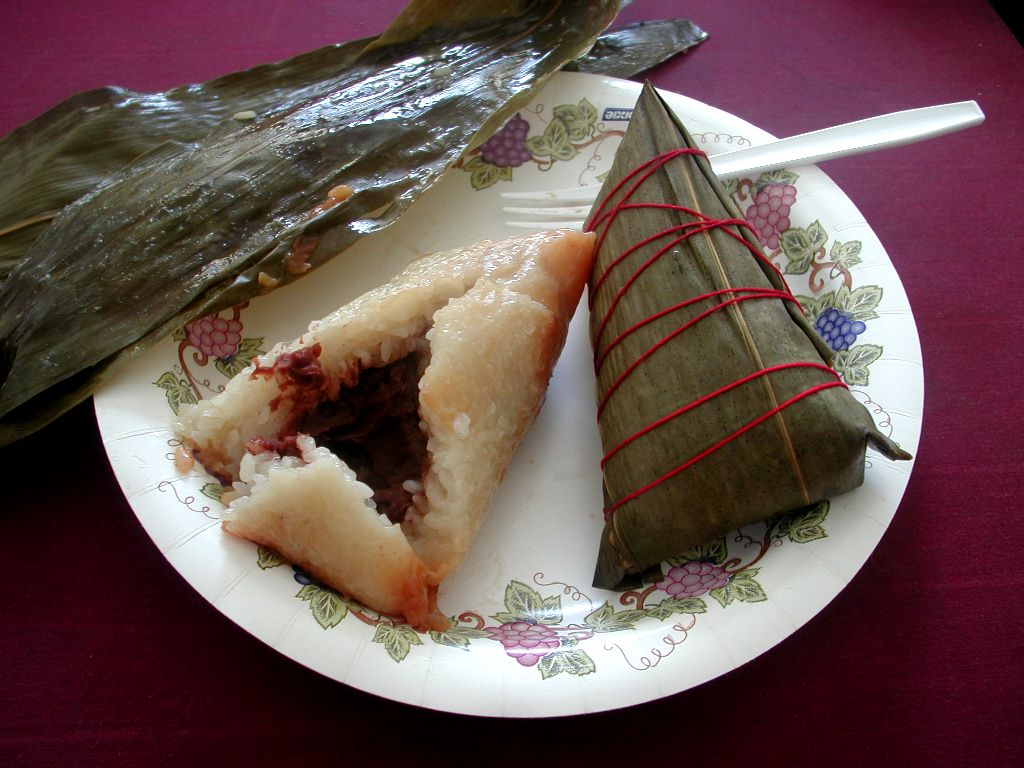
Red Bean Rice Dumpling

=== Zongzi (traditional Chinese rice dumplings) ===
A notable part of celebrating the Dragon Boat Festival is making and eating zongzi, also known as sticky rice dumplings, with family members and friends. People traditionally make zongzi by wrapping glutinous rice and fillings in leaves of reed or bamboo, forming a pyramid shape. The leaves also give a special aroma and flavor to the sticky rice and fillings. Choices of fillings vary depending on regions. Northern regions in China prefer sweet or dessert-styled zongzi, with red bean paste, jujube, and nuts as fillings. Southern regions in China prefer savory zongzi, with a variety of fillings including eggs and meat.

Zongzi appeared before the Spring and Autumn period and were originally used to worship ancestors and gods. In the Jin dynasty, zongzi dumplings were officially designated as the Dragon Boat Festival food. At this time, in addition to glutinous rice, the Chinese medicine yizhiren (Alpinia oxyphylla) was added to the ingredients for making zongzi. This cooked zongzi is called yizhi zong.

=== Food related to 端午 ===
'Wu' (午) in the name 'Duanwu' has a pronunciation similar to that of the number 5 in multiple Chinese dialects, and thus many regions have traditions of eating food that is related to the number 5. For example, the Guangdong and Hong Kong regions have the tradition of having congee made from 5 different beans. Jiangsu, Zhejiang and Huangshan area have the custom to eat "five yellow", which refers to five different foods with "yellow" in names.

=== Realgar wine ===
Realgar wine or Xionghuang wine is a Chinese alcoholic drink that is made from Chinese liquor dosed with powdered realgar, a yellow-orange arsenic sulfide mineral. It was traditionally used as a pesticide, and as a common antidote against disease and venom. On the Dragon Boat Festival, people may put realgar wine on parts of children's faces to repel the five poisonous creatures.

=== 5-colored silk-threaded braid ===
In some regions of China, people, especially children, wear silk ribbons or threads of 5 colors (blue, red, yellow, white, and black, representing the five elements) on the day of the Dragon Boat Festival. People believe that this will help keep evil away.

Other common activities include hanging up icons of Zhong Kui (a mythic guardian figure), hanging mugwort and calamus, taking long walks, and wearing perfumed medicine bags. Other traditional activities include a game of making an egg stand at noon (this "game" implies that if someone succeeds in making the egg stand at exactly 12:00 noon, that person will receive luck for the next year), and writing spells. All of these activities, together with the drinking of realgar wine or water, were regarded by the ancients (and some today) as effective in preventing disease or evil while promoting health and well-being.

In the early years of the Republic of China, Duanwu was celebrated as the "Poets' Day" due to Qu Yuan's status as China's first known poet. In Taiwanese tradition, balancing an egg on Duanwu is said to bring good fortune for the rest of the year.

The sun is considered to be at its strongest around the time of the summer solstice, as the daylight in the northern hemisphere is the longest. The sun, like the Chinese dragon, traditionally represents masculine energy, whereas the moon, like the phoenix, traditionally represents feminine energy. The summer solstice is considered the annual peak of male energy while the winter solstice, the longest night of the year, represents the annual peak of feminine energy. The masculine image of the dragon has thus become associated with the Dragon Boat Festival.

== Gallery ==
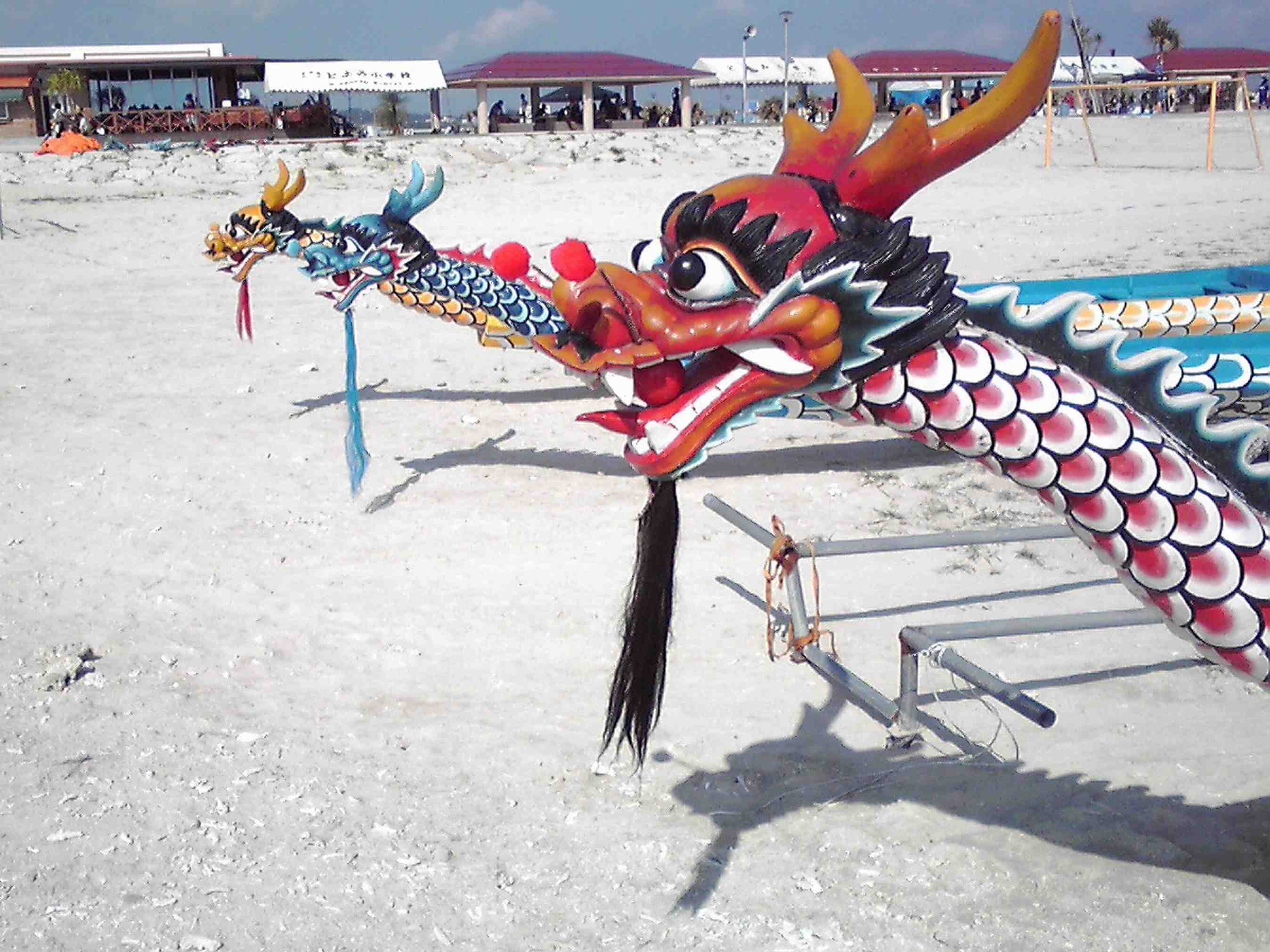
Hari in Tomigusuku, Okinawa, Japan

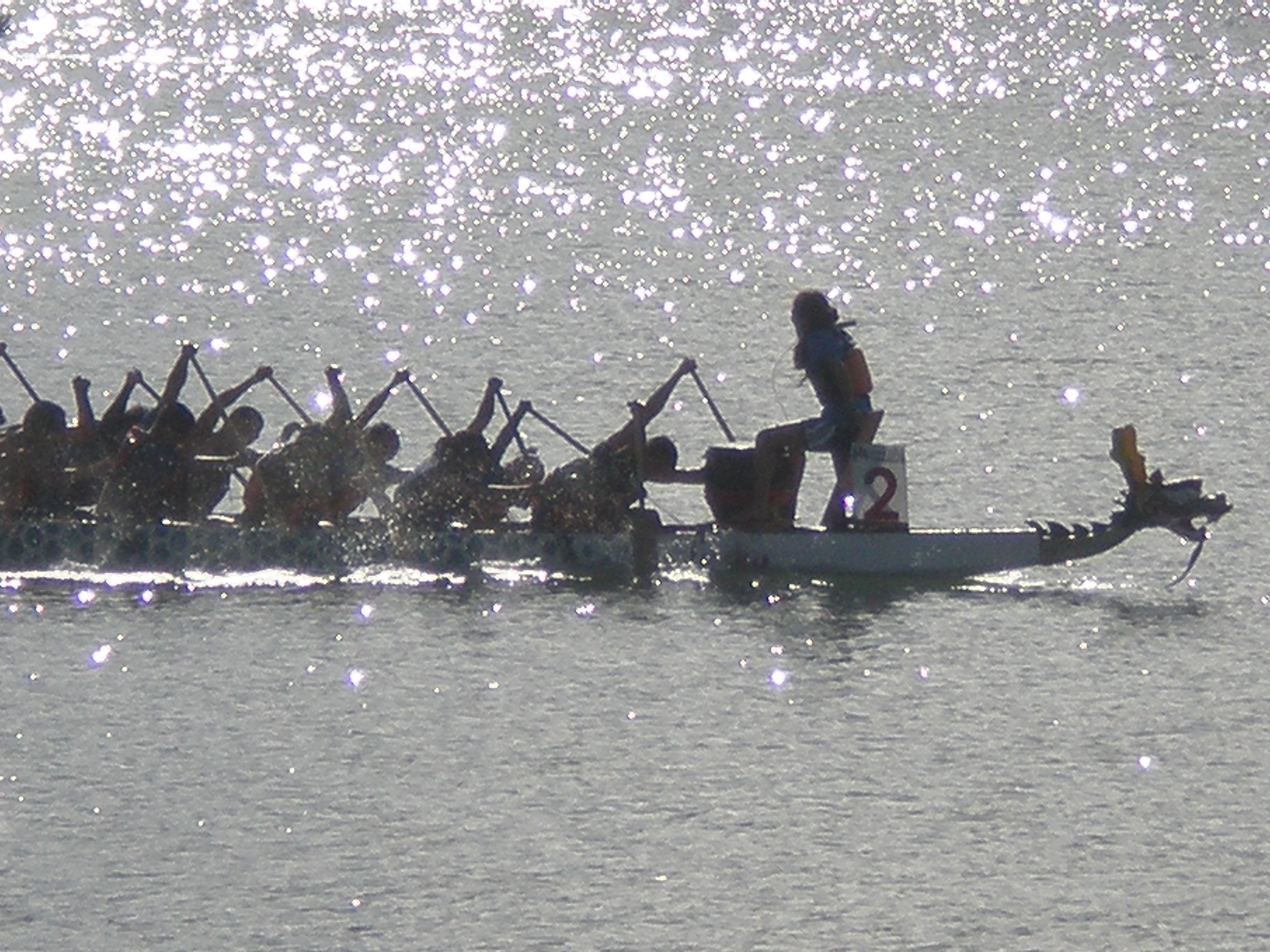
A dragon boat racing in San Francisco, 2008

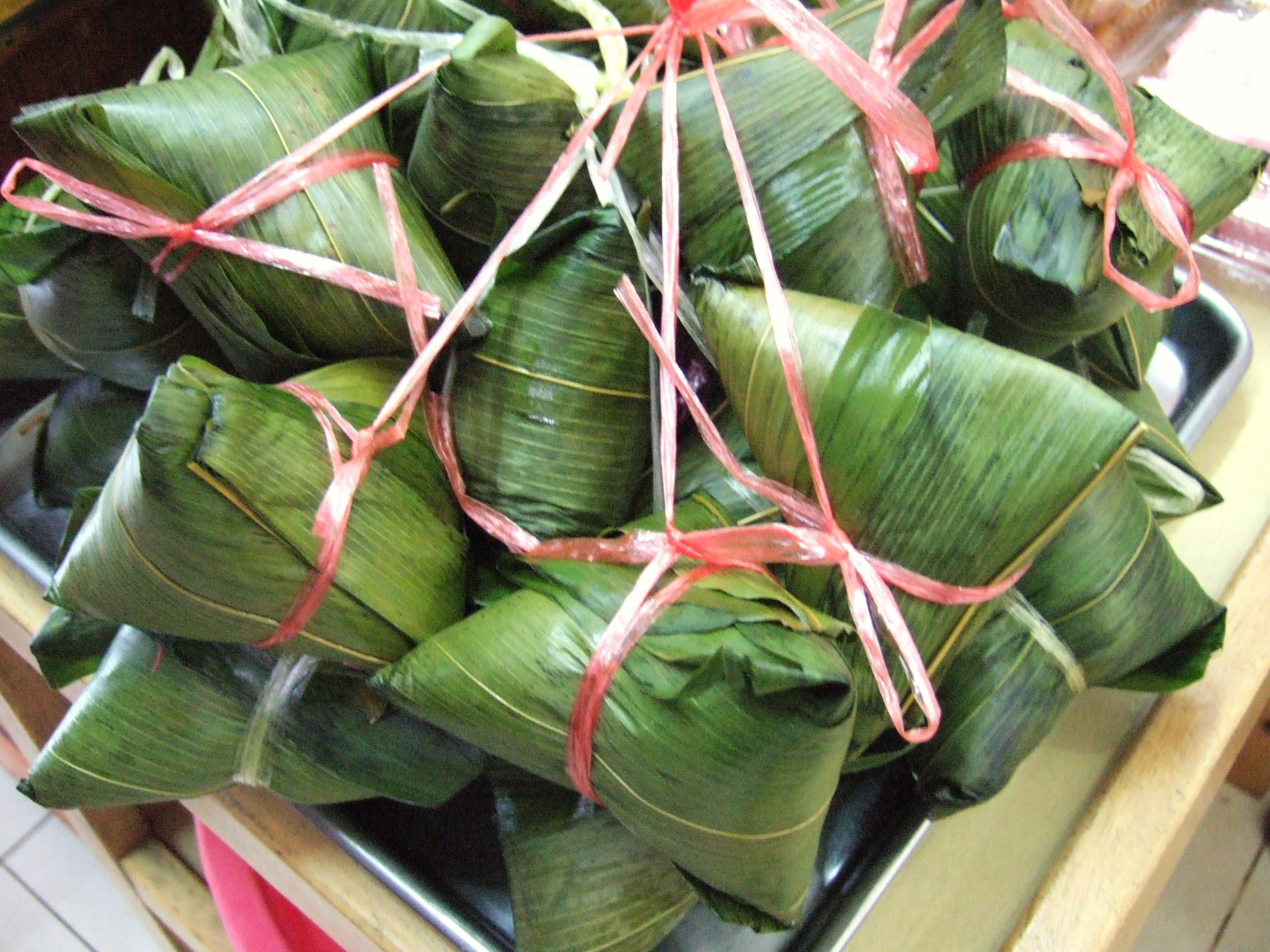
Uncooked zongzi

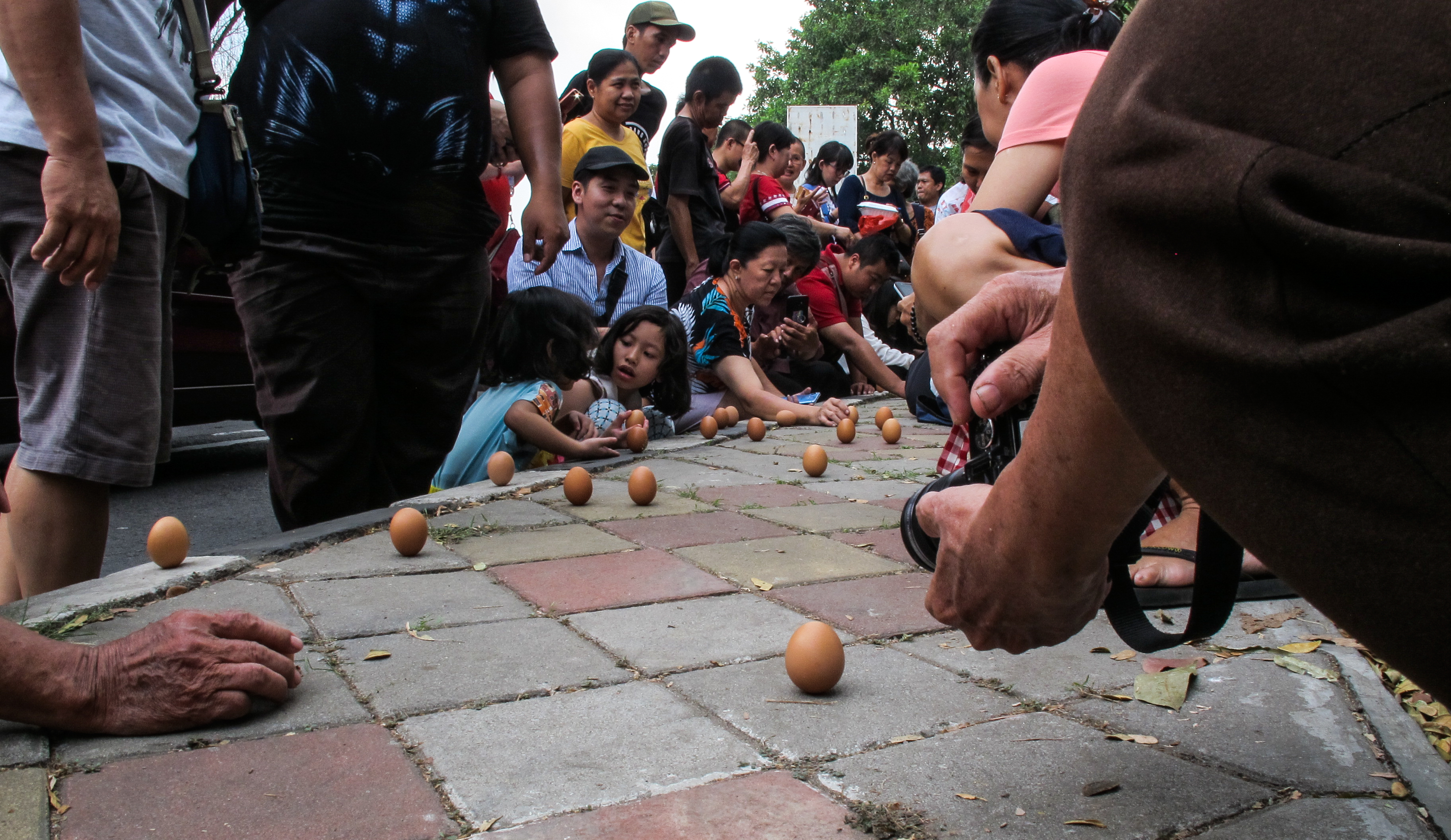
Egg balancing in Tangerang, Indonesia

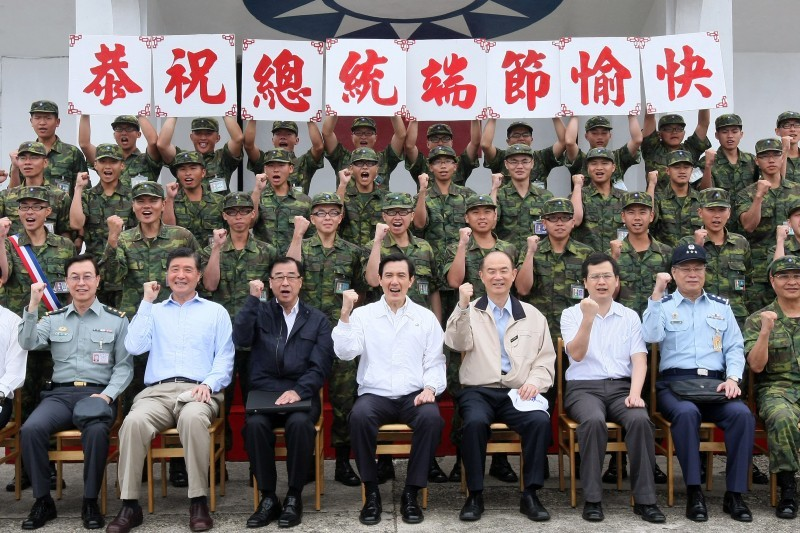
Taiwan's president Ma Ying-jeou visiting Liang Island before the Dragon Boat Festival (2010)
The sign reads: "Respectfully Wishing the President a Joyous Dragon Boat Festival"
(恭祝總統端節愉快)

== See also ==
- Bon Om Touk
- Traditional Chinese holidays
