= Tết Đoan Ngọ =

Vietnamese festival

Tết Đoan Ngọ 節端午 Tết Đoan Dương 節端陽
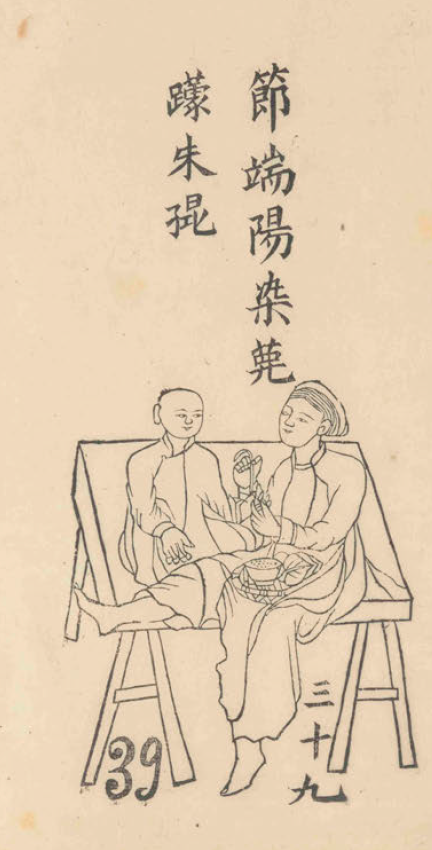
- A mother and child during Tết Đoan Dương (節端陽) dying her child's nails to ward off bad spirits. The picture reads "Tết Đoan Dương nhuộm lá móng cho con (節端陽染𦲿𲄌朱𡥵)".
- Observed by: Vietnamese
- Type: Cultural
- Observances: consumption of Rượu nếp
- Date: Fifth day of the fifth lunar month
- Frequency: Annual
- Related to: Duanwu Festival, Tango no sekku, Dano, Yukka Nu Hii

Tết Đoan Ngọ is the Vietnamese version of Chinese Duanwu festival (literally: Tết: festival, Đoan: the start/straight/middle/righteousness/just, Ngọ: at noon (from 11 am to 1 pm). Đoan Ngọ is the moment that the sun is the most near the earth and this day often is "The middle day of summer" (Hạ chí). In Vietnam, this day is also the death anniversary of National Mother Âu Cơ.

Compared to Cantonese Chinese term "dyun eng" (which is duan wu in Mandarin Chinese) ngo/eng/wu all refer to the ancient Chinese calendar term: the seventh of the twelve Earthly Branches, which was a component for determining time based on a series of 60 years (just as today we refer to 100 year periods as centuries).) Ngo/eng/wu refers to the sun at noon.

Tết Đoan Dương (Dương: yang) - yang being sun
Tết Trùng Ngũ (Trùng: double, Ngũ: the fifth),
Tết Đoan Ngũ, Tết Trùng Nhĩ or Tết Nửa Năm (Nửa Năm: a half of a year) is a festival celebrated at noon on the fifth day of the fifth lunar month. This day is the day around the time when the tail of the Great Bear points directly to the south, that is, around the time of the summer solstice. At this time, the universe brings the greatest amount of yang or maleness in the entire year. Therefore, creatures and people must become stronger in both their health and their souls to overcome this.

== Traditions ==
Rượu nếp, a sticky rice wine, is traditionally eaten on this holiday. Bánh tro, a kind of bánh lá, is used during this holiday with hard-boiled eggs. Bánh tro is considered as "cool", symbolized yin because it includes vegetable ash water as an ingredient. Bánh tro is a perfect match with extreme hot day like May 5 in the lunar year.

== Modern festival ==
On the occasion of Tết Đoan Ngọ, there is Festival of Delicious Fruit celebrated in Chợ Lách, Bến Tre Province with activities: fruit competition, fruit arrangement competition and fruit crop competition. At this time, there is also Festival of Southern Fruit celebrated in Suối Tiên amusement park, Ho Chi Minh city.

== See also ==
- Dano (Korean festival)
- Duanwu Festival
- Kodomo no hi
