= Yukka Nu Hii =

Ryukyuans annual festival

- Observed by: Okinawa Islands
- Type: Ethnic, cultural
- Significance: Giving thanks to the sea and agricultural gods and asking for their continued help for the future
- Celebrations: dragon boat races
- Date: 4th day of the 5th lunar month
- Related to: tango no sekku (Children's Day)

Yukka nu hii (Okinawan: 四日ぬ日 or 四日の日 - lit “the fourth day”) is an annual festival of the Okinawa Islands, which is traditionally celebrated on the 4th day of the 5th month of the lunisolar calendar.

== Festival ==
The festival centers on the traditional dragon boat (haarii, ohaaree in Itoman) races. The dragon boat races are a form of giving thanks to the sea and agricultural gods and asking for their continued help for the future.

Currently, Naha is host to the largest dragon boat race, although Itoman and Tamagusuku are also known for holding large races.

== History ==
The festival dates back to circa 1400, where it is said to have been adopted from the Chinese.

Like many other elements that characterize modern Okinawan culture, yukka nu hii used to have a limited geographic distribution. In northern Okinawa, it was seen as a festival of south–central Okinawa. The dragon boat race is said to have been introduced to Unten, Nakijin Village in the mid-Meiji period, or from the end of the 19th century to the early 20th century.

Since the Meiji period, many Itoman fishermen have migrated to other parts of Okinawa Prefecture, with their haarii races. For example, they started the boat race in Ishigaki City of the Yaeyama Islands in 1906. Ethnologist Matsuo Kōichi noted that in some coastal communities of the Miyako and Yaeyama Islands, boat races were no longer associated with the yukka nu hii festival but with the harvest festival of the 6th lunar month or the shichi festival of the 9th month. The Amami Islands of North Ryukyu have similar boat races. They are usually held in August and appear to have distinct roots.
