= Bánh bột lọc =

Tapioca starch dumpling in Vietnamese cuisine

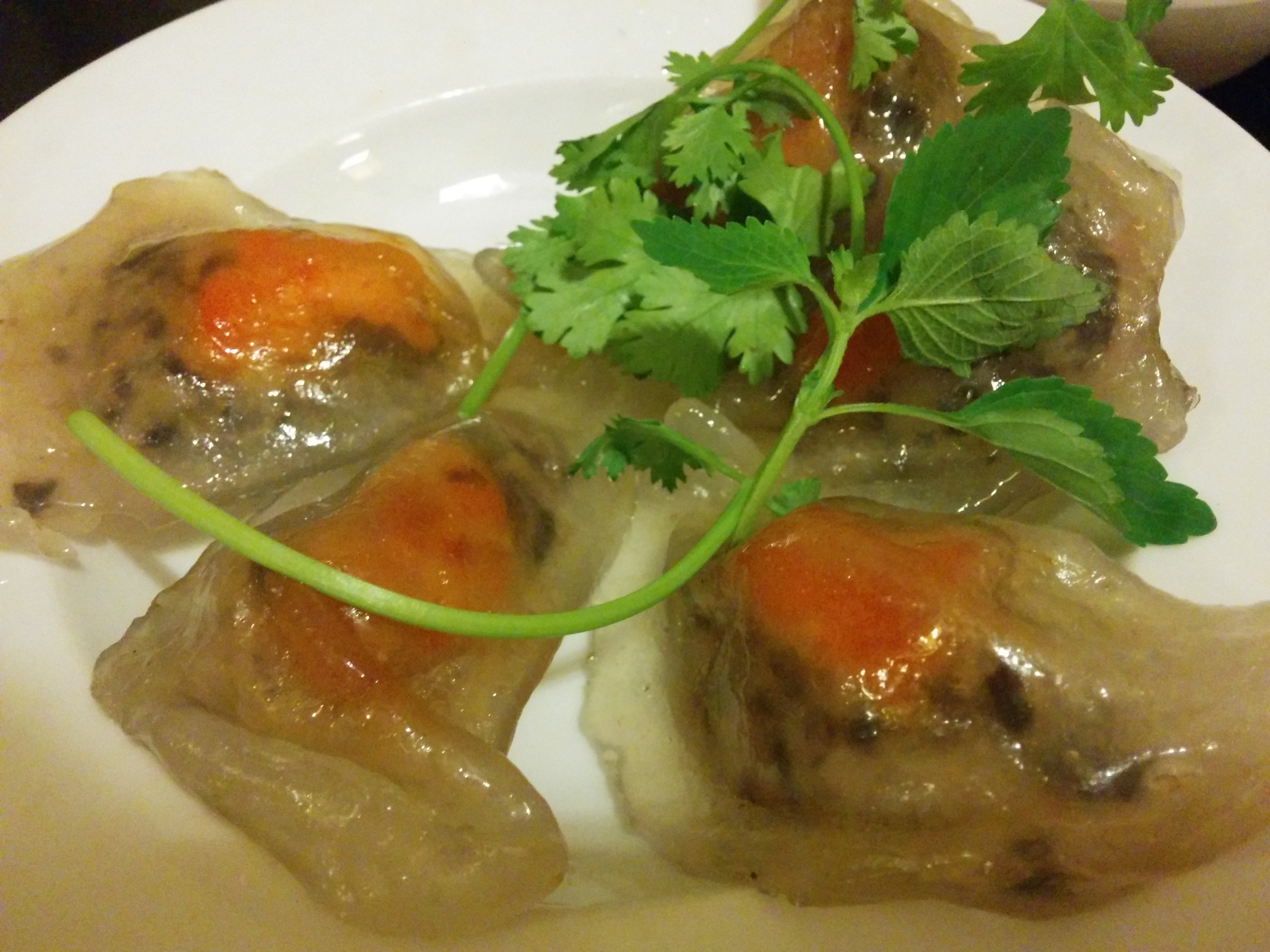
- Bánh bột lọc
- Type: Dumpling
- Course: Snack
- Place of origin: Vietnam
- Region or state: Regions of Vietnam
- Main ingredients: Tapioca starch, shrimp, pork belly
- Variations: Bánh bột lọc trần, bánh bột lọc lá

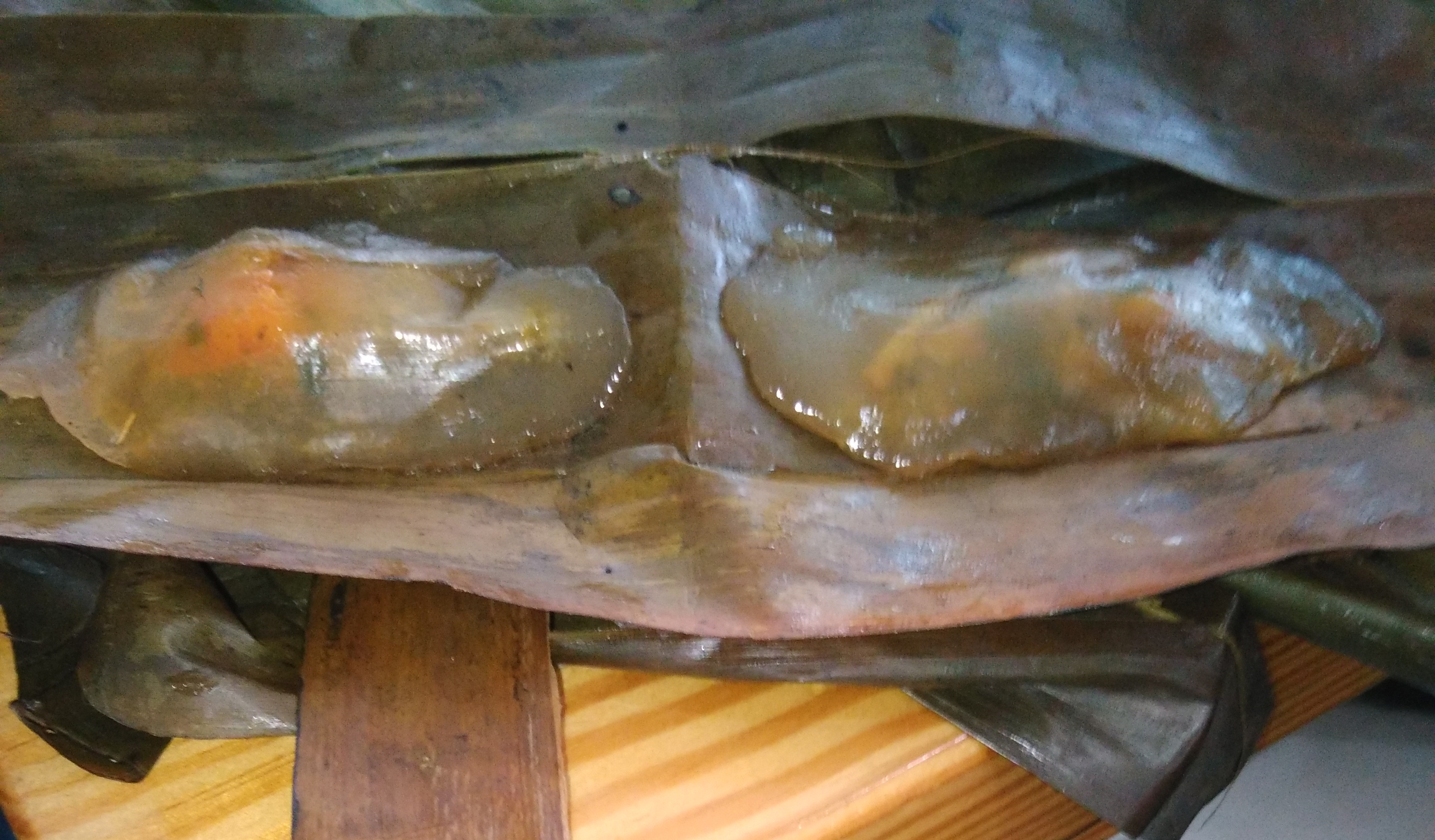
Bánh bột lọc wrapped in leaves

Bánh bột lọc are small, clear-looking, chewy tapioca dumplings in Vietnamese cuisine that can be eaten as appetizers or small snacks. They are usually filled with shrimp and pork belly, often being topped with fried shallots and served with sweet chili fish sauce. They are said to have originated from Huế, as the city was once the imperial capital of the Nguyễn dynasty and known for having simple, yet sophisticated dishes.

== Etymology ==
The dish's name is believed to have come from its clear, dumpling-like appearance, as the term bánh bột lọc Huế loosely translates to "clear flour cake." In Vietnamese, the word bánh can mean "cake" or "bread," but can also be used as a general term for foods that are made from any type of flour, the most common being rice or tapioca. Bột literally means flour, although it does not specify the type, and lọc means "refine" or "clarify."

== Variation ==
Bánh bột lọc can either be steamed or boiled and wrapped with or without banana leaf. With the banana leaf wrapping, it is called bánh bột lọc lá, meaning "clear flour cake with leaf." Without the banana leaf wrapping, it is called bánh bột lọc trần, meaning "clear flour cake bare." The filling is traditionally a whole grilled shrimp with the shell on and a slice of pork belly, but variations have had the filling be shrimp without the shell, no pork belly, ground pork, mushrooms, and onions. In addition to tapioca flour, corn starch and rice flour have also been known to be added in the making of the translucent wrapper.

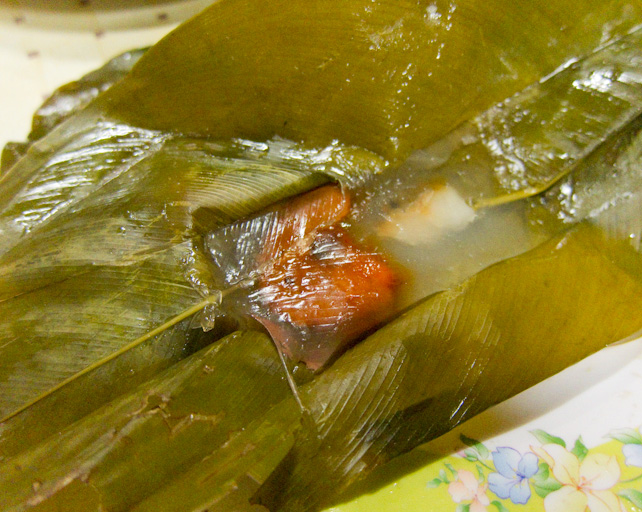
Bánh bột lọc lá containing shrimp and pork belly

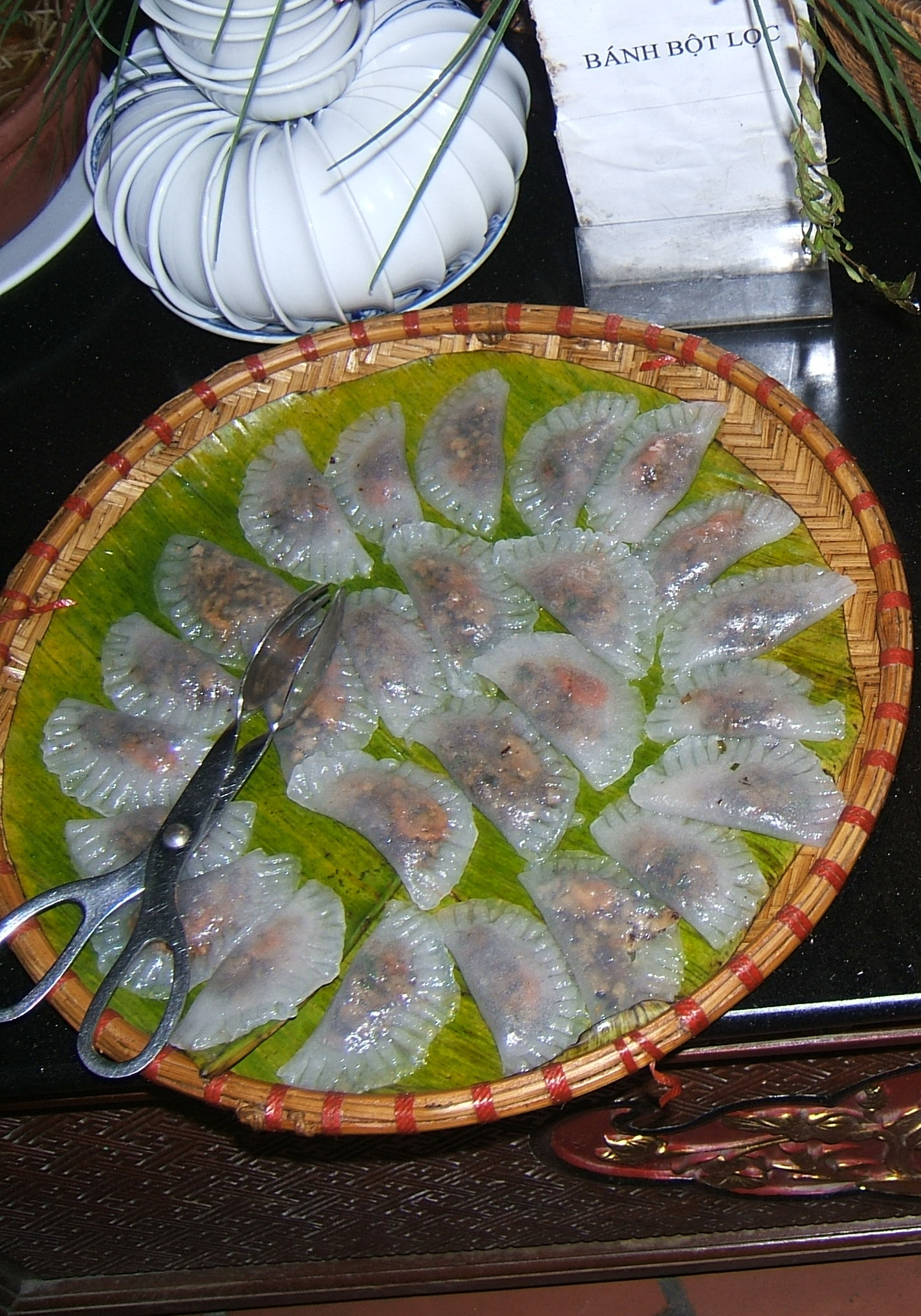
Bánh bột lọc trần containing shrimp, ground pork, and mushrooms

== Production ==
Bánh bột lọc trần is made by adding boiling water into tapioca starch, then mixing and kneading until a smooth, soft, and elastic dough is formed. The dough is then divided into small balls and flattened, where the filling is placed in the middle. The dough gets folded over the filling and the edges pinched together to seal the filling in and creating a dumpling shape. The dumplings are either steamed or cooked in boiling water, then drained and rinsed with cold water. Making bánh bột lọc lá is similar to making bánh bột lọc trần. The dough is placed in blanched banana leaves, some filling is added in the center, and then some more dough is placed on top to cover the filling. The banana leaves are then wrapped tightly and tied together with small strands of banana leaf before being steamed. Regardless of the method, the dish can be frozen for later use.

== See also ==
- Bánh bèo
- Bánh
- List of steamed foods
