= Bánh giò =

Vietnamese steamed pyramid-shaped savory rice cake

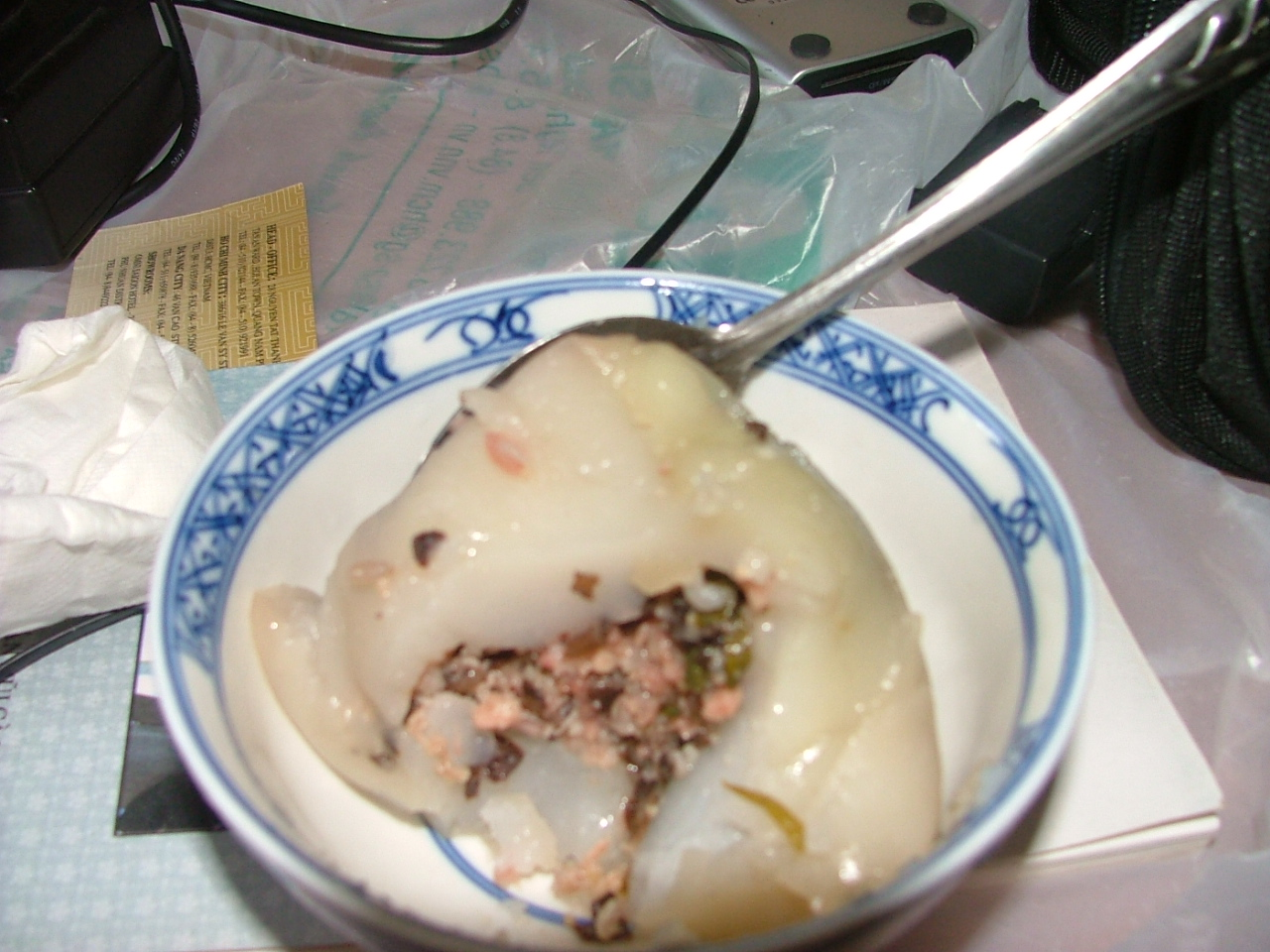
A piece of Bánh giò

Bánh giò is a Vietnamese steamed pyramid-shaped savory rice cake. It is made with a filling of ground pork, wood ear mushrooms, and onions covered with a thin layer of glutinous rice flour dough and wrapped with banana leaves. The bánh giò is then steamed until the dough is cooked through and the filling is hot and flavorful. You can eat bánh giò plain or can eat with soy sauce or chili sauce.

Bánh giò is thought to be originated in northern Vietnam and now has become a popular street food in all over Vietnam. It is often kept warm and sold from small carts or stalls, and it is a popular breakfast and snack food. Bánh giò can also be found in many Vietnamese restaurants.
