= Miluo River =

River in China

Coordinates: 29°00′04″N 112°57′00″E

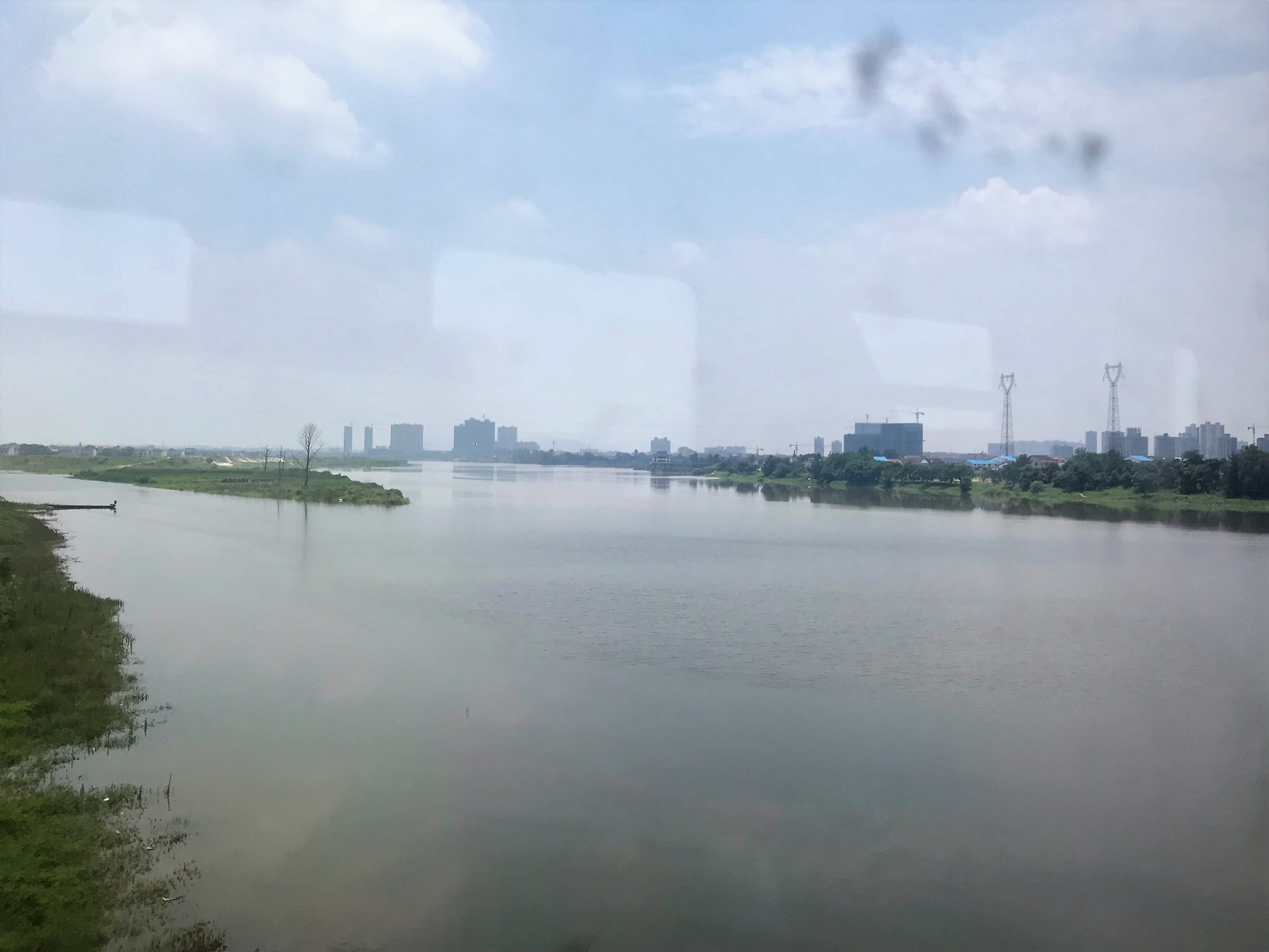
Miluo River in Miluo City, Hunan

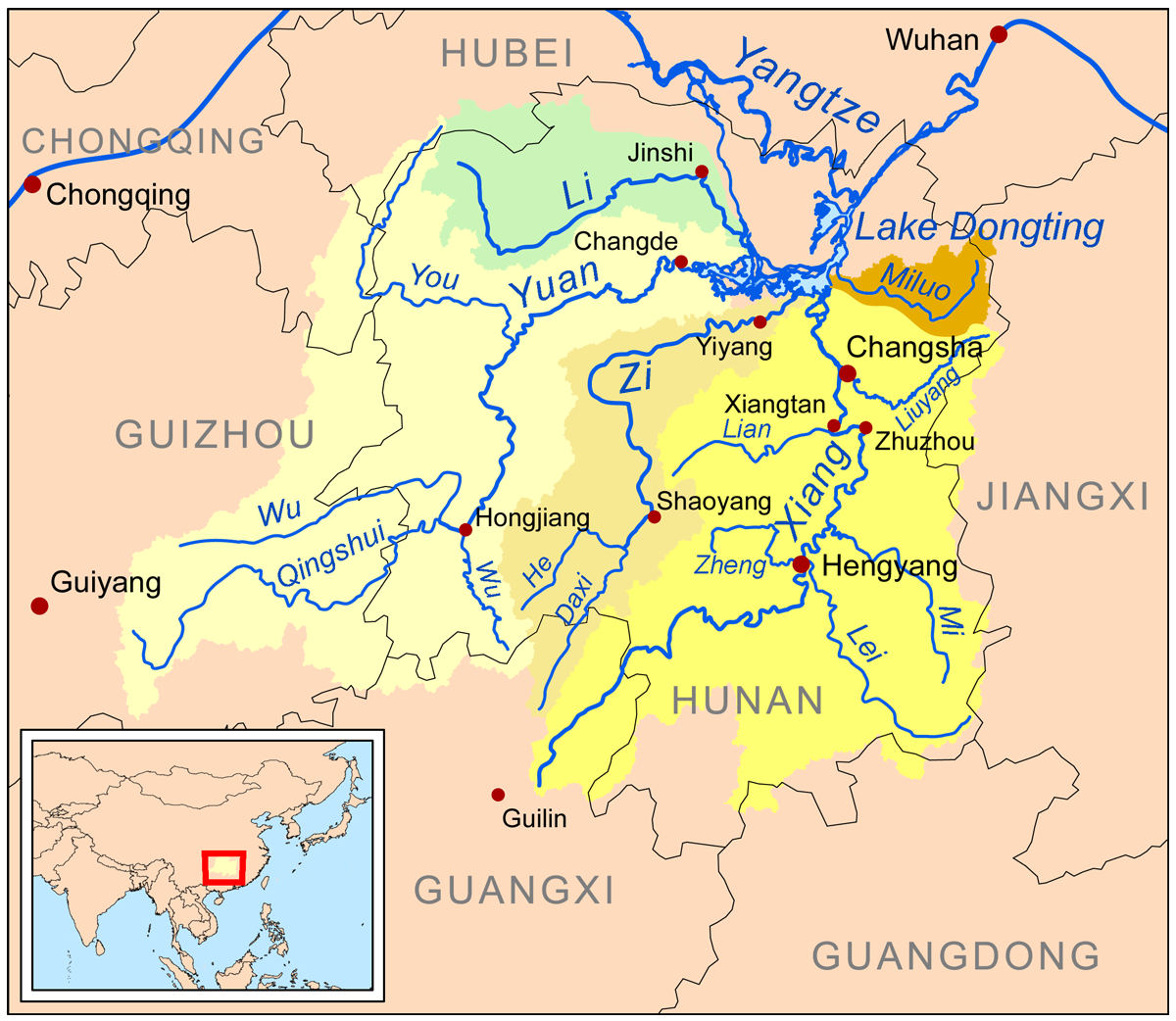
Map showing the Miluo River basin (in dark orange)

The Miluo River (traditional Chinese: 汨羅江; simplified Chinese: 汨罗江; pinyin: Mìluójiāng, and with modified Wade–Giles using the form Mi-lo) is located on the eastern bank of Dongting Lake, the largest tributary of the Xiang River in the northern Hunan Province. It is an important river in the Dongting Lake watershed, known as the location of the ritual suicide in 278 BC of Qu Yuan, a poet of Chu state during the Warring States period, in protest against the corruption of the era.

Originating in Xiushui County of Jiangxi province, the Miluo river is about 400 kilometres (250 mi) long. It passes Pingjiang county in Hunan and empties into Dongting Lake in Miluo city. The river is formed by the confluence of the Mi and Luo rivers, of which the Mi river is the main branch. The two rivers become the Miluo river after joining in Daqiuwan (大丘灣), Miluo city.

== See also ==
- Qu Yuan (340-278 BC)
