= List of Egyptian inventions and discoveries =

Egyptian inventions and discoveries are ideas, objects, processes or techniques invented, innovated or discovered, partially or entirely, by Egyptians. Often, things discovered for the first time are also called inventions and in many cases, there is no clear line between the two.

The following is a list of inventions, innovations or discoveries known or generally recognized to be Egyptian.

== Ancient Egypt ==
=== Government and economy in Ancient Egypt ===
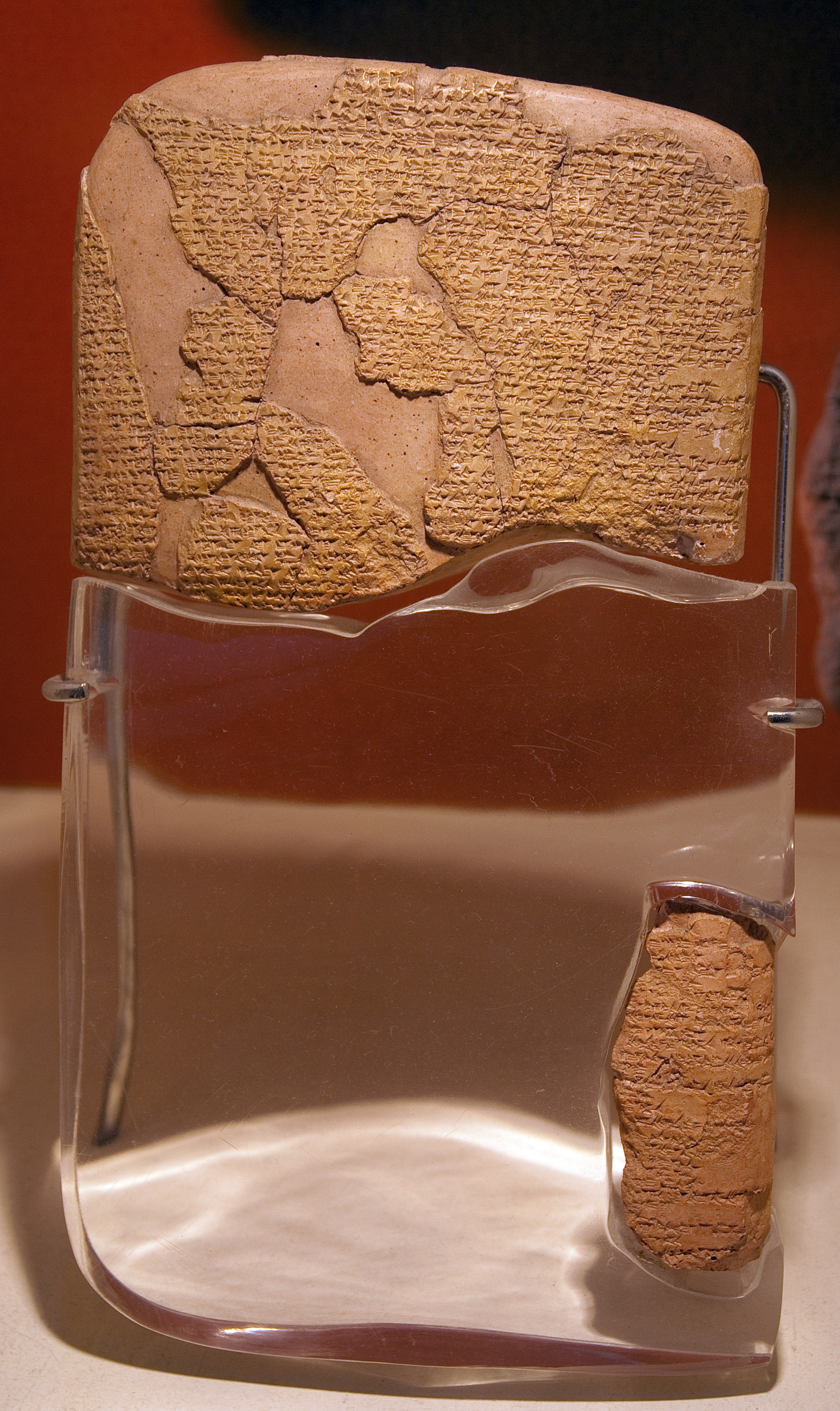
Tablet of one of the earliest recorded treaties in history, Treaty of Kadesh, at the Istanbul Archaeology Museum

- Community banking models — Community banking is a non-traditional form of money-lending. Unlike banks or other classic lending institutions, the funds that community banks lend to borrowers are gathered by the local community itself. This tends to mean that the individuals in a neighborhood or group have more control over who is receiving the capital and how that capital is being spent. This practice has existed in some form for centuries; in ancient Egypt, for example, when grain was often used as currency, local granaries would store and distribute the community's food supply. Since that time, a variety of community banking models have evolved.
- Police – In ancient Egypt evidence of law enforcement exists as far back as the Old Kingdom period. There are records of an office known as "Judge Commandant of the Police" dating to the Fourth Dynasty.
- Postal system — The first documented use of a postal system, state-sponsored, designated courier service for the dissemination of written documents is in Egypt, where Pharaohs used couriers to send out decrees throughout the territory of the state (2400 BCE).
- Law — Ancient Egyptian law, dating as far back as 3000 BC, was based on the concept of Ma'at and characterised by tradition, rhetorical speech, social equality, and impartiality.

=== Warfare ===
- Arrowslit — Loop holes are found for the first time in some Middle kingdom forts.
- Battering rams — The earliest depiction of a possible battering ram is from the tomb of the 11th Dynasty noble Khety, where a pair of soldiers advance towards a fortress under the protection of a mobile roofed structure, carrying a long pole that may represent a simple battering ram.
- Battlements – Another feature of the Buhen fortress the construction of the world's oldest battlements.
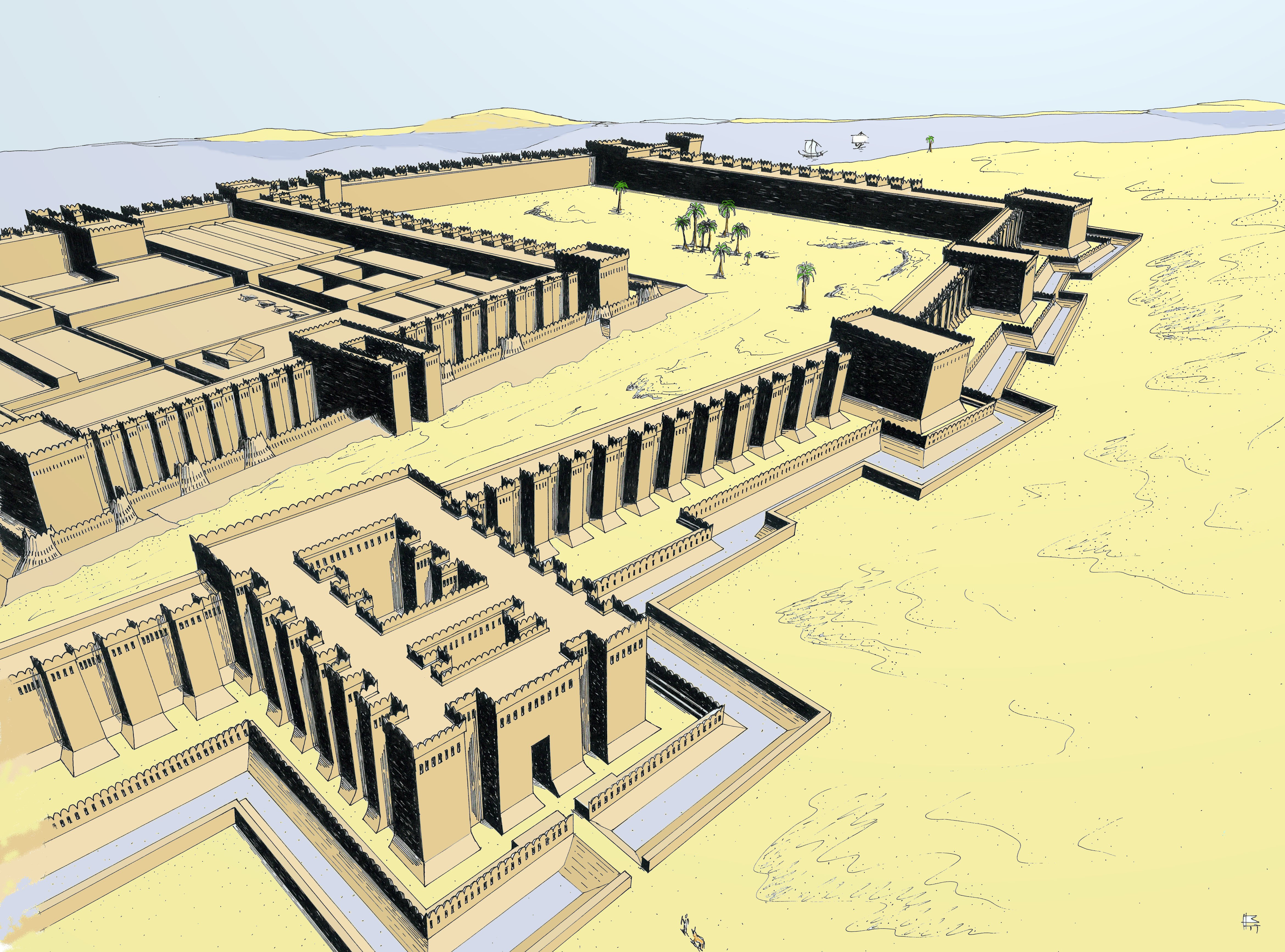
  Reconstruction of Buhen fortress
- Catapult — A catapult dating to the 19th century BC was found on the walls of the fortress of Buhen.
- Dagger — In ancient Egypt, daggers were usually made of copper or bronze, while royalty had gold weapons. At least since pre-dynastic Egypt, (c. 3100 B.C) daggers were adorned as ceremonial objects with golden hilts and later even more ornate and varied construction. One early silver dagger was recovered with midrib design.
- Draw bridge — The fortress of Buhen contains the oldest known drawbridges.
- Encryption — One of the earliest forms of encryption is symbol replacement, which was first found in the tomb of Khnumhotep II, who lived in 1900 BC Egypt. Symbol replacement encryption is "non-standard," which means that the symbols require a cipher or key to understand.
- Grappling hook — The ancient Egyptians used grappling hooks as early as the Bronze Age collapse and in their war with the Sea people.
- Military organization — As early as the Old Kingdom (c.2686–2160 BC) Egypt used specific military units, with military hierarchy appearing in the Middle Kingdom (c.2055–1650 BC).
- Military scribe and battle recording – The first well documented battle in the history of the world is the Battle of Megiddo.
- Naval ram — Naval rams were built on ships since at least the reign of Amenhotep I.
- Police dogs and war dogs — were used by the Egyptians as early as 4000 B.C.
- Siege towers — Moving siege towers were invented in Egypt during the First Intermediate Period.

=== Agriculture and animal husbandry ===
- Beekeeping — domesticated beekeeping was first recorded in ancient Egypt around 2600 BC. as well as the first use of smoke while extracting the honey from bee nests.
- Diversion dam — The first diversion dam is Sadd el-Kafara Dam built in Egypt around 2700 B.C.
- Horse stable — The world's oldest horse stables were discovered in the ancient city of Pi-Ramesses in Qantir, in Ancient Egypt, and were established by Ramesses II (c. 1304–1213 BC). These stables covered approximately 182,986 square feet, had floors sloped for drainage, and could contain about 480 horses.
- Noria — Norias appeared in Egypt in the 4th Century B.C.
- Olive cultivation – Some scholars have argued that olive cultivation originated with the Ancient Egyptians.
- Ox drawn plough — Ox drawn ploughs were used by Ancient Egyptians as early as 2000 B.C.
- Zoo — The world's first zoo was discovered at Hierakonpolis dating back to 3,500 B.C.

=== Transport ===
- Harbor / Dock — The earliest known Harbors were those discovered in Wadi al-Jarf, an ancient Egyptian harbor, (ca. 2600–2550 BCE, reign of King Khufu), located on the Red Sea coast. Archaeologists also discovered anchors and storage jars near the site.
- Hulls – Hulls were first built in Egypt as early as 3000 B.C
- Masts and bipod mast — The bipod mast is a two-legged mast used originally in Egypt during the 3rd millennium BCE. It can be described as two poles secured together at the top, forming a thin isosceles triangle. It did not appear until the Old Kingdom, third dynasty, and disappeared after the sixth dynasty when the pole mast took over during the Middle Kingdom.
- Paved road — The world's oldest surviving paved road was discovered near Faiyum dating back to the 26th century BC.
- Sail — cloth sails are depicted in predynastic Egyptian art (c. 3300 B.C).
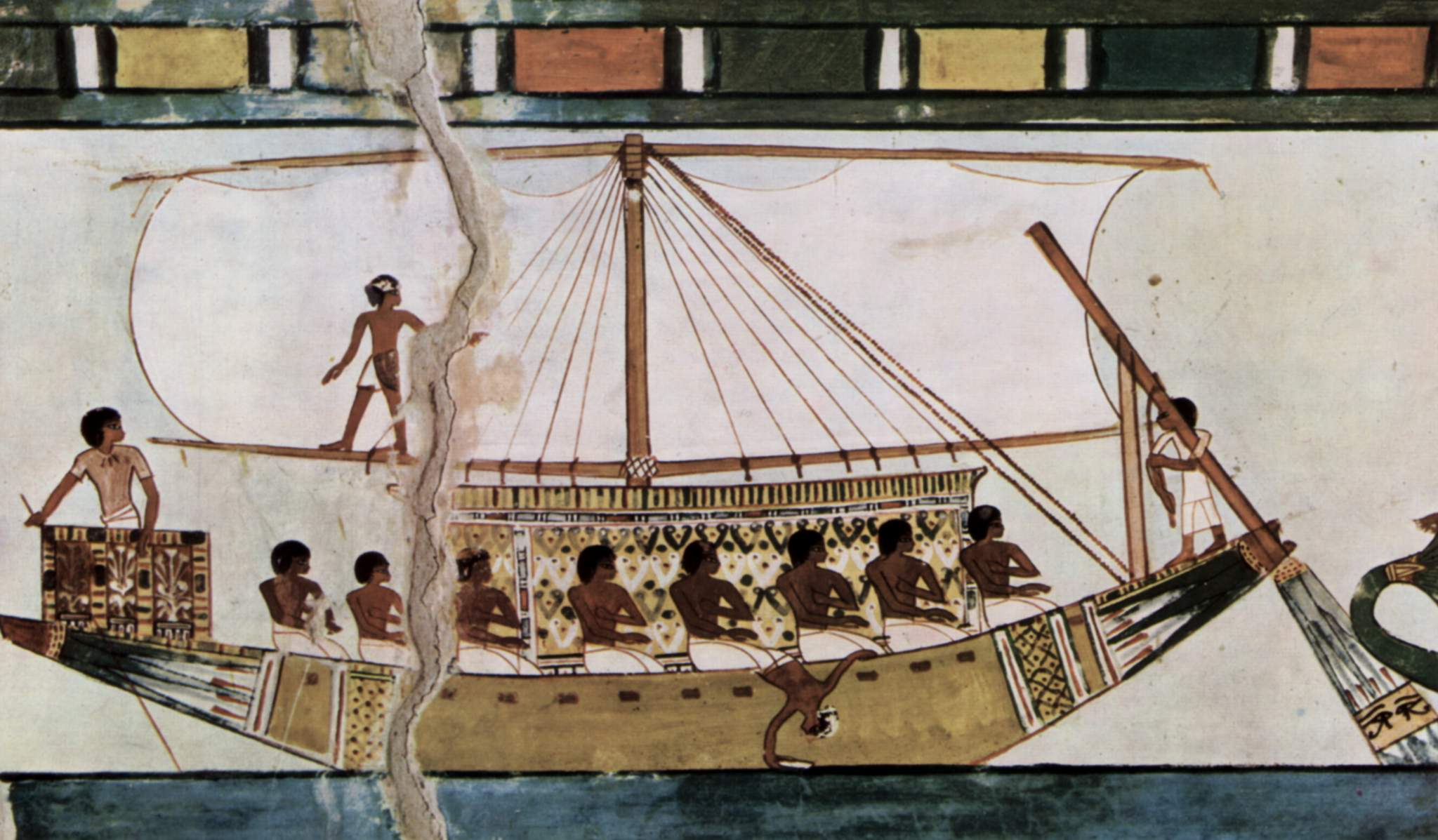
  Egyptian sailing ship, ca. 1422–1411 BCE
- Stern-mounted steering oar — A predecessor to the rudder. Rowing oars set aside for steering appeared on large Egyptian vessels long before the time of Menes (3100 BC). In the Old Kingdom (2686 BC–2134 BC) as many as five steering oars are found on each side of passenger boats. The tiller, at first a small pin run through the stock of the steering oar, can be traced to the fifth dynasty (2504–2347 BC). Both the tiller and the introduction of an upright steering post abaft reduced the usual number of necessary steering oars to one each side. Single steering oars put on the stern can be found in a number of tomb models of the time, particularly during the Middle Kingdom when tomb reliefs suggests them commonly employed in Nile navigation. The first literary reference appears in the works of the Greek historian Herodotus (484–424 BC), who had spent several months in Egypt: "They make one rudder, and this is thrust through the keel", probably meaning the crotch at the end of the keel (see right pic "Tomb of Menna").

=== Metallurgy and materials ===
- Amethyst — a form of quartz was first used by the Ancient Egyptians.
- Electrum — Electrum was used as early as the third millennium BC in Old Kingdom of Egypt, sometimes as an exterior coating to the pyramidions atop ancient Egyptian pyramids and obelisks. It was also used in the making of ancient drinking vessels. Electrum is mentioned in an account of an expedition sent by Pharaoh Sahure of the Fifth Dynasty of Egypt.
- Emerald — Emerald was first mined in Egypt since at least the New Kingdom.
- Lime mortar — The Ancient Egyptians were the first to use lime mortars which they used to plaster the pyramids at Giza. In addition, the Egyptians also incorporated various limes into their religious temples as well as their homes. Indian traditional structures built with lime mortar, which are more than 4,000 years old like Mohenjo-daro is still a heritage monument of Indus valley civilization in Pakistan. It is one of the oldest known types of mortar also used in ancient Rome and Greece, when it largely replaced the clay and gypsum mortars common to ancient Egyptian construction.
- Malachite — Malachite was mined from deposits near the Isthmus of Suez and the Sinai as early as 4000 BC.
- Mercury — The earliest known use of mercury dates to Ancient Egypt around 1500 BC.
- Natron — Natron was used by the Ancient Egyptians in mummification.
- Turquoise — Turquoise was mined in Egypt since at least the First Dynasty (3000 BC), and possibly before then, turquoise was used by the Egyptians and was mined by them in the Sinai Peninsula. This region was known as the Country of Turquoise by the native Monitu. Serabit el-Khadim and Wadi Maghareh, believed to be among the oldest of known mines.
- Wattle and daub — Wattle and daub was used in Egypt as early as the Merimde culture.

=== Medicine ===
==== Discoveries ====
- Anatomy — In 1600 BCE, the Edwin Smith Papyrus, an Ancient Egyptian medical text, described the heart, its vessels, liver, spleen, kidneys, hypothalamus, uterus and bladder, and showed the blood vessels diverging from the heart. The Ebers Papyrus (c. 1550 BCE) features a "treatise on the heart", with vessels carrying all the body's fluids to or from every member of the body.
- Cancer – The earliest written record regarding cancer is from circa 1600 B.C in the Egyptian Edwin Smith Papyrus and describes breast cancer.
- Cerebrospinal fluid
- Circulatory system — The earliest known writings on the circulatory system are found in the Ebers Papyrus (16th century BCE), an ancient Egyptian medical papyrus containing over 700 prescriptions and remedies, both physical and spiritual. In the papyrus, it acknowledges the connection of the heart to the arteries. The Egyptians thought air came in through the mouth and into the lungs and heart. From the heart, the air travelled to every member through the arteries. Although this concept of the circulatory system is only partially correct, it represents one of the earliest accounts of scientific thought.
- Crutch — Crutches were used in ancient Egypt.
- Diabetes — Diabetes was one of the first diseases described, with an Egyptian manuscript from c. 1500 BCE mentioning "too great emptying of the urine". The Ebers papyrus includes a recommendation for a drink to take in such cases. The first described cases are believed to have been type 1 diabetes.
- Dracunculiasis or Guinea-worm disease and its treatment – The Ebers Papyrus says that the cure to the Guinea worm disease is to wrap the emerging end of the worm around a stick and slowly pull it out. 3,500 years later, this remains the standard treatment.
- Hematuria — One of the main symptoms of bilharzia was known and treated by the ancient Egyptians.
- Hysteria — The oldest record of hysteria dates back to 1900 BC, when Egyptians recorded behavioral abnormalities in adult women on medical papyrus. The Egyptians attributed the behavioral disturbances to a wandering uterus—thus later dubbing the condition hysteria. To treat hysteria, Egyptian doctors prescribed various medications. For example, doctors put strong-smelling substances on the patients' vulvas to encourage the uterus to return to its proper position. Another tactic was to smell or swallow unsavory herbs to encourage the uterus to flee back to the lower part of the female's stomach.
- Meninges
- Paralysis
- Urinary incontinence — The management of urinary incontinence with pads is mentioned in the earliest medical book known, the Ebers Papyrus (1500 B.C).

==== Surgery ====
- Cataract surgery — The earliest known depiction of cataract surgery is on a statue from the Fifth Dynasty (2467–2457 BCE).
- Colorectal surgery — The Chester Beatty Medical Papyrus, is one of the extant medical papyri, from ancient Egypt. It is dedicated to magical incantations against headaches and remedies for anorectal ailments, and is dated around 1200 BC.
- Rhinoplasty — Treatments for the plastic repair of a broken nose are first mentioned in the Edwin Smith Papyrus, a transcription of text dated to the Old Kingdom from 3000 to 2500 BCE.

==== Inventions ====
- Bandage — The Ancient Egyptians were the first to use adhesive bandages and were also the first to treat wounds with honey.
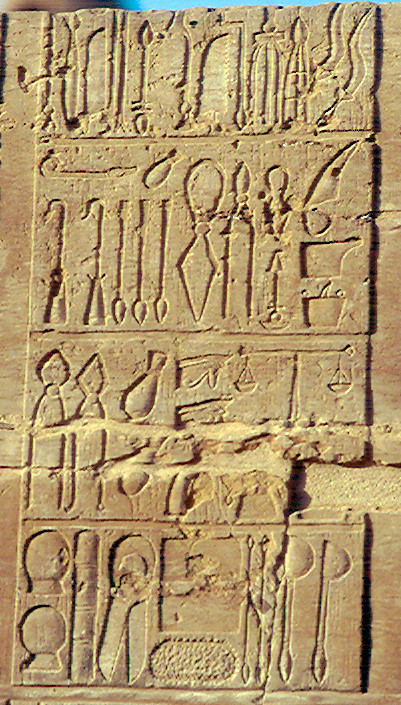
  Inscription detailing ancient Egyptian medical instruments, including bone saws, suction cups, knives and scalpels, retractors, scales, lances, chisels and dental tools.
- Breath mint
- Cauterization — Cauterization has been used to stop heavy bleeding since antiquity. The process was described in the Edwin Smith Papyrus.
- Intramedullary rod — The oldest intramedullary nail was found in the left knee of a mummy named Usermontu, the remains of an Egyptian man from more than 3,500 years ago. Researchers believe the pin was inserted after the man's death, but before his burial.
- Poultice
- Prosthesis — Prosthetics appeared circa 3,000 BC. with the earliest evidence of prosthetics appearing in ancient Egypt and Iran. The earliest recorded mention of eye prosthetics is from the Egyptian story of the Eye of Horus dates circa 3000 BC, which involves the left eye of Horus being plucked out and then restored by Thoth. The Egyptians were also early pioneers of foot prosthetics, as shown by the wooden toe found on a body from the New Kingdom circa 1000 BC.
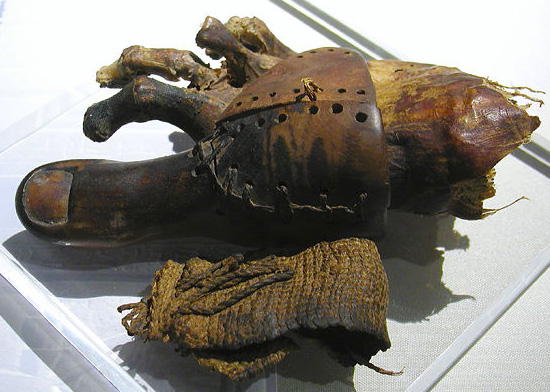
  Prosthetic toe from ancient Egypt
- Splint
- Tampon — The oldest printed medical document, Papyrus Ebers, refers to the use of soft papyrus tampons by Egyptian women in the fifteenth century B.C.
- Toothpaste — Since 5000 BC, the Egyptians made a tooth powder, which consisted of powdered ashes of ox hooves, myrrh, powdered and burnt eggshells, and pumice.

==== Innovations ====
- Birth control — The Egyptian Ebers Papyrus from 1550 BC and the Kahun Papyrus from 1850 BC have within them some of the earliest documented descriptions of birth control: the use of honey, acacia leaves and lint to be placed in the vagina to block sperm.
- Gynaecology — The Kahun Gynaecological Papyrus, dated to about 1800 BC, deals with women's health gynaecological diseases, fertility, pregnancy, contraception, etc. Treatments are non-surgical, comprising applying medicines to the affected body part or swallowing them. The womb is at times seen as the source of complaints manifesting themselves in other body parts.
- Ophthalmology — In the Ebers Papyrus from ancient Rome dating to 1550 BC, a section is devoted to eye diseases.
- Pregnancy test — The ancient Egyptians watered bags of wheat and barley with the urine of a possibly pregnant woman. Germination indicated pregnancy. The type of grain that sprouted was taken as an indicator of the fetus's sex.
- Surgical suture — The earliest reports of surgical suture date to 3000 BC in ancient Egypt, and the oldest known suture is in a mummy from 1100 BC.

=== Mathematics ===
==== Algebra ====
- 0 — By 1770 BC, the Egyptians had a symbol for zero in accounting texts. The symbol nfr, meaning beautiful, was also used to indicate the base level in drawings of tombs and pyramids and distances were measured relative to the base line as being above or below this line.
- Arithmetic progression — Rhind Mathematical Papyrus problem number 40.
  Arithmetic values thought to have been represented by parts of the Eye of Horus
- Binary — The method used for ancient Egyptian multiplication is also closely related to binary numbers. In this method, multiplying one number by a second is performed by a sequence of steps in which a value (initially the first of the two numbers) is either doubled or has the first number added back into it; the order in which these steps are to be performed is given by the binary representation of the second number. This method can be seen in use, for instance, in the Rhind Mathematical Papyrus, which dates to around 1650 BC.
- Conversion of units — Rhind Mathematical Papyrus problem number 42.
- Dyadic rational — The Egyptians also had a different notation for dyadic fractions in the Akhmim Wooden Tablet and several Rhind Mathematical Papyrus problems.
- Exponentiation (power of two) — The ancient Egyptians had laid out tables of a great number of powers of two, rather than recalculating them each time. The decomposition of a number thus consists of finding the powers of two which make it up. The Egyptians knew empirically that a given power of two would only appear once in a number.
- Fraction and arithmetics with fractions — The earliest fractions were reciprocals of integers: ancient symbols representing one part of two, one part of three, one part of four, and so on. The Egyptians used Egyptian fractions c. 1000 BC. About 4000 years ago, Egyptians divided with fractions using slightly different methods. They used least common multiples with unit fractions. Their methods gave the same answer as modern methods.
- Geometric mean and geometric progression — problem no.79 in Rhind Mathematical Papyrus.
- Golden number
- Mathematical symbols — The Egyptian hieroglyphic sign for addition resembled a pair of legs walking in the direction in which the text was written (Egyptian could be written either from right to left or left to right), with the reverse sign indicating subtraction:

D54 or D55

- Numeral system — Written evidence of the use of mathematics dates back to at least 3200 BC with the ivory labels found in Tomb U-j at Abydos. These labels appear to have been used as tags for grave goods and some are inscribed with numbers. Further evidence of the use of the base 10 number system can be found on the Narmer Macehead which depicts offerings of 400,000 oxen, 1,422,000 goats and 120,000 prisoners.
- Pefsu problem (modern day: arithmetic mean and arithmetic progression)
- Pi — Based on the measurements of the Great Pyramid of Giza (c. 2560 BC) , (Note: Allegedly built so that the circle whose radius is equal to the height of the pyramid has a circumference equal to the perimeter of the base) some Egyptologists have claimed that the ancient Egyptians used an approximation of π as 22/7 from as early as the Old Kingdom. The Rhind Papyrus, dated around 1650 BC but copied from a document dated to 1850 BC, has a formula for the area of a circle that treats π as (16/9)^{2} ≈ 3.16.
- Quadratic equation — The ancient Egyptians were the first civilization to develop and solve second-degree (quadratic) equations. This information is found in the Berlin Papyrus fragment. Additionally, the Egyptians solve first-degree algebraic equations found in Rhind Mathematical Papyrus.
- Red auxiliary number — Red auxiliary numbers were written in red ink in the Rhind Mathematical Papyrus, apparently used as aids for arithmetic computations involving fractions.
- Regula falsi — The simple false position technique is found in papyri from ancient Egyptian mathematics.
- Rhind Mathematical Papyrus — from around 1550 BC, has Egyptian fraction expansions of different forms for prime and composite numbers.
- Seked (modern-day slope) — The seked is proportional to the reciprocal of our modern measure of slope or gradient, and to the cotangent of the angle of elevation.
- Square root — The Rhind Mathematical Papyrus is a copy from 1650 BC of an earlier Berlin Papyrus and other texts – possibly the Kahun Papyrus – that shows how the Egyptians extracted square roots by an inverse proportion method.
- Trigonometry — Rhind Mathematical Papyrus problem number 56. The Egyptians, used a primitive form of trigonometry for building pyramids in the 2nd millennium BC.However, they lacked the concept of an angle measure and were limited to studying the sides of triangles instead.
- X (unknown)

==== Areas and volumes ====
- Area of triangle — Rhind Mathematical Papyrus problem number 51.
- Area of trapezoid — Rhind Mathematical Papyrus problem number 52.
- Surface area of sphere — The Tenth problem of the Moscow Mathematical Papyrus asks for a calculation of the surface area of a hemisphere (Struve, Gillings) or possibly the area of a semi-cylinder (Peet). Below we assume that the problem refers to the area of a hemisphere.
- Volume of cylinder — Rhind Mathematical Papyrus problem number 41.
- Volume of prism — Rhind Mathematical Papyrus problem number 46.
- Volume of pyramid
- Volume of frustum — The 14th problem of the Moscow Mathematical Papyrus calculates the volume of a frustum. Problem 14 states that a pyramid has been truncated in such a way that the top area is a square of length 2 units, the bottom a square of length 4 units, and the height 6 units, as shown. The volume is found to be 56 cubic units, which is correct.

==== Measurement ====
- Area — Records of land area also date to the Early Dynastic Period. The Palermo stone records grants of land expressed in terms of kha and setat. Mathematical papyri also include units of land area in their problems. For example, several problems in the Moscow Mathematical Papyrus give the area of rectangular plots of land in terms of setat and the ratio of the sides and then require the scribe to solve for their exact lengths.
- Length — Egyptian units of length are attested from the Early Dynastic Period. Although it dates to the 5th dynasty, the Palermo stone recorded the level of the Nile River during the reign of the Early Dynastic pharaoh Djer, when the height of the Nile was recorded as 6 cubits and 1 palm (about 3.217 m or 10 ft 6.7 in). A 3rd Dynasty diagram shows how to construct an elliptical vault using simple measures along an arc. The ostracon depicting this diagram was found near the Step Pyramid of Saqqara. A curve is divided into five sections and the height of the curve is given in cubits, palms, and digits in each of the sections.
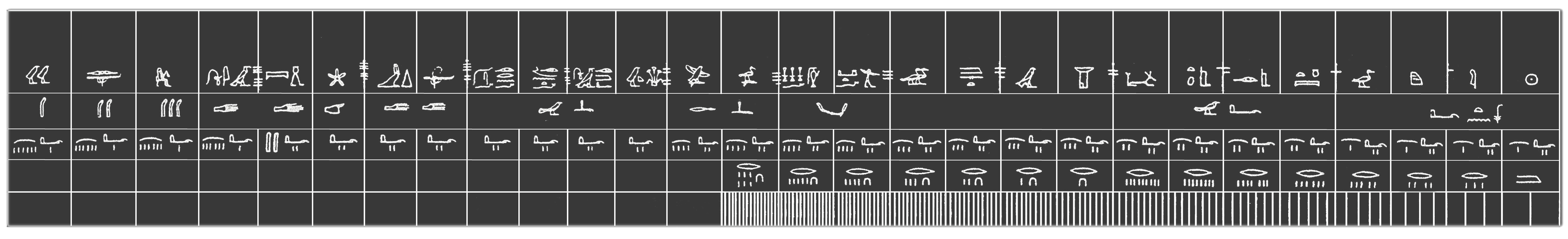
  Cubit rod from the Turin Museum.
- System of measurement and metrology — Ancient Egypt was one of the first civilization to have system of measurement.
- Triangulation — The use of triangles to estimate distances dates to antiquity. In the 6th century BC, about 250 years prior to the establishment of the Ptolemaic dynasty, the Greek philosopher Thales is recorded as using similar triangles to estimate the height of the pyramids of ancient Egypt. He measured the length of the pyramids' shadows and that of his own at the same moment, and compared the ratios to his height (intercept theorem). Such techniques would have been familiar to the ancient Egyptians. Problem 57 of the Rhind papyrus, a thousand years earlier, defines the seqt or seked as the ratio of the run to the rise of a slope, i.e. the reciprocal of gradients as measured today.
- Volume
- Weight — Weighs were known since the Old Kingdom and perhaps as early as the Early Dynastic Period. Weights were measured in terms of deben. This unit would have been equivalent to 13.6 grams in the Old Kingdom and Middle Kingdom. During the New Kingdom however it was equivalent to 91 grams. For smaller amounts the qedet (1/10 of a deben) and the shematy (1/12 of a deben) were used.

=== Science ===
- Geological map — The oldest known geological map is the Turin papyrus (1150 BCE), which shows the location of building stone and gold deposits in Egypt. It would be another 2900 years before the next geological map was made and this was in France during the mid-1700's. the Turin Papyrus is also a topographic map and the first relatively modern-looking of its kind.

=== Astronomy ===
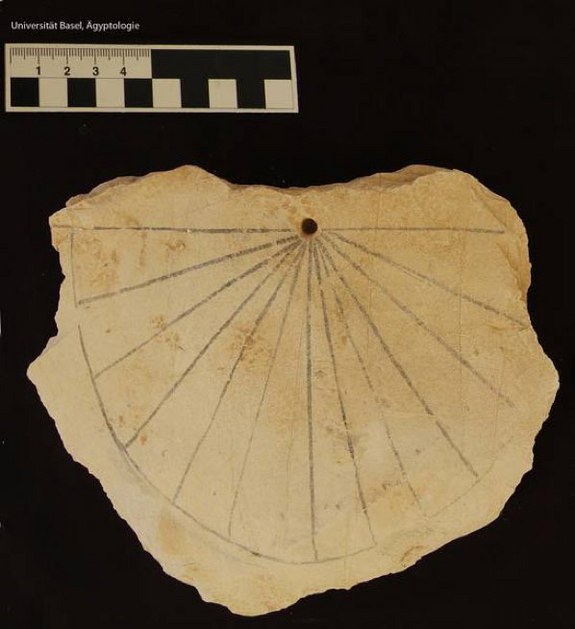
World's oldest sundial, from Egypt's Valley of the Kings (c. 1500 BC)

- Calendar
- Decan — Decans are 36 groups of stars (small constellations) used in the Ancient Egyptian astronomy. They rose consecutively on the horizon throughout each Earth rotation. The rising of each decan marked the beginning of a new decanal "hour" (Greek hōra) of the night for the ancient Egyptians, and they were used as a sidereal star clock beginning by at least the 9th or 10th Dynasty (c. 2100 BCE).
- The discovery of Algol — An Ancient Egyptian calendar of lucky and unlucky days composed some 3,200 years ago is claimed to be the oldest historical document of the discovery of Algol.
- Solstice and Equinox
- Sothic cycle
- Star clock
- Sundials – The earliest sundials known from the archaeological record are shadow clocks (1500 BC or BCE) from ancient Egyptian astronomy.

=== Tools and machines ===
- Air conditioning — The basic concept behind air conditioning is said to have been applied in ancient Egypt, where reeds were hung in windows and were moistened with trickling water. The evaporation of water cooled the air blowing through the window. This process also made the air more humid, which can be beneficial in a dry desert climate.
- Archimedes' screw — Although commonly attributed to Archimedes, the device had been used in Ancient Egypt long before his time. The first records of a water screw, or screw pump, date back to Ancient Egypt before the 3rd century BC. The Egyptian screw, used to lift water from the Nile, was composed of tubes wound round a cylinder; as the entire unit rotates, water is lifted within the spiral tube to the higher elevation. A later screw pump design from Egypt had a spiral groove cut on the outside of a solid wooden cylinder and then the cylinder was covered by boards or sheets of metal closely covering the surfaces between the grooves.
- Bellows — Bellows were used as early as the New Kingdom.
- Combs
- Copper pipes – The c. 2400 BC Pyramid of Sahure, and adjoining temple complex at Abusir, was discovered to have a network of copper drainage pipes.
- Core drill — The earliest core drills were those used by the ancient Egyptians, invented in 3000 BC.
- Doors and door Locks — – The earliest in records are those represented in the paintings of some ancient Egyptian tombs, in which they are shown as single or double doors, each in a single piece of wood. Doors were once believed to be the literal doorway to the afterlife, and some doors leading to important places included designs of the afterlife. Basic principles of the Pin tumbler lock may date as far back as 2000 BC in Egypt; the lock consisted of a wooden post affixed to the door, and a horizontal bolt that slid into the post. The bolt had vertical openings into which a set of pins fitted. These could be lifted, using a key, to a sufficient height to allow the bolt to move and unlock the door. This wooden lock was one of Egypt's major developments in domestic architecture during classical times.
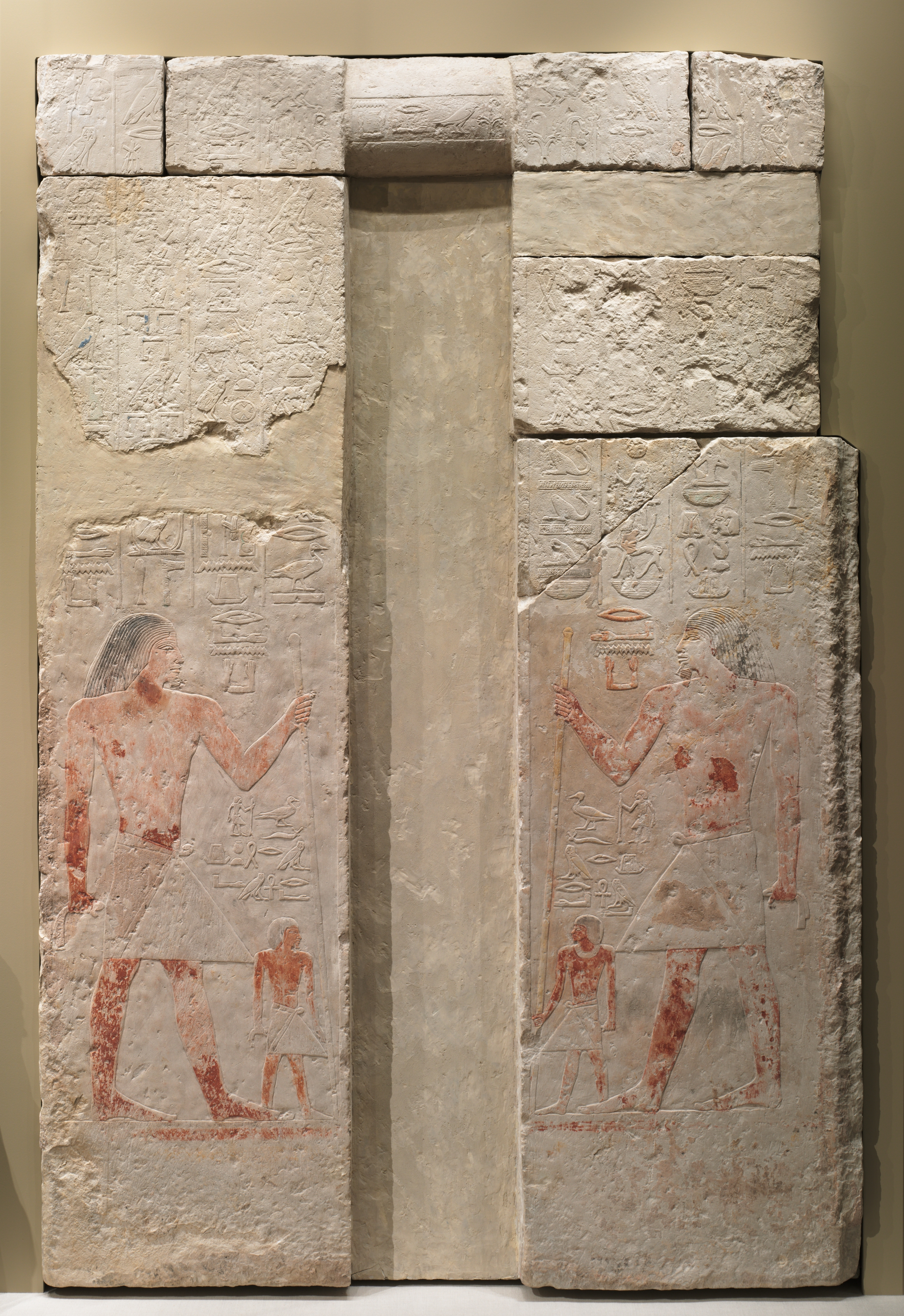
  False door of Nykara, c. 2408 BC, painted limestone, 168 x 111.5 × 6 cm, Cleveland Museum of Art
- Hand fan — Hand fans had been used in Egypt as early as 4,000 years ago. Hand fans have been found in King Tut's tomb.
- Herodotus Machine — The Herodotus Machine was a machine described by Herodotus, a Greek historian. Herodotus claims this invention enabled the ancient Egyptians to construct the pyramids. The contraption supposedly allowed workers to lift heavy building materials. Herodotus is believed to have encountered the device while traveling through Egypt. With limited reference and no true schematics, this machine has stimulated many historians' theories of how the Ancient Egyptians were able to create pyramids.
- Hinge — Ancient remains of stone, marble, wood, and bronze hinges have been found. Some date back to at least Ancient Egypt.
- Ink — Ink was used in Ancient Egypt for writing and drawing on papyrus from at least the 26th century BC.
- Lathe — The lathe is an ancient tool. The earliest evidence of a lathe dates back to Ancient Egypt around 1300 BC. There is also tenuous evidence for its existence at a Mycenaean Greek site, dating back as far as the 13th or 14th century BC.
- Lever — Levers (as machines used in lifting heavy weights) were invented in Ancient Egypt. In ancient Egypt technology, workmen used the lever to move and uplift obelisks weighing more than 100 tons. This is evident from the recesses in the large blocks and the handling bosses which could not be used for any purpose other than for levers.
- Loom — Looms were used in ancient Egypt as early as 4400 BC, a foot pedal was used for the earliest horizontal frame loom.
- Merkhet — The merkhet was an ancient surveying and timekeeping instrument. It involved the use of a bar with a plumb line, attached to a wooden handle. It was used to track the alignment of certain stars called decans or "baktiu" in the Ancient Egyptian. When visible, the stars could be used to measure the time at night. There were 10 stars for the 10 hours of the night; the day had a total of 24 hours including 12 hours for the day, 1 hour for sunset, and 1 hour for sunrise. Merkhets were used to replace sundials, which were useless during the dark.
- Ostracon — The Saqqara ostracon is an ostracon, an Egyptian antiquity, tracing to the period of Djoser (2650 BC),
- Papyrus scroll — Papyrus paper was first manufactured in Egypt as far back as the fourth millennium BCE. The earliest archaeological evidence of papyrus was excavated in 2012 and 2013 at Wadi al-Jarf, an ancient Egyptian harbor located on the Red Sea coast. These documents, the Diary of Merer, date from c. 2560–2550 BCE (end of the reign of Khufu). The papyrus rolls describe the last years of building the Great Pyramid of Giza.
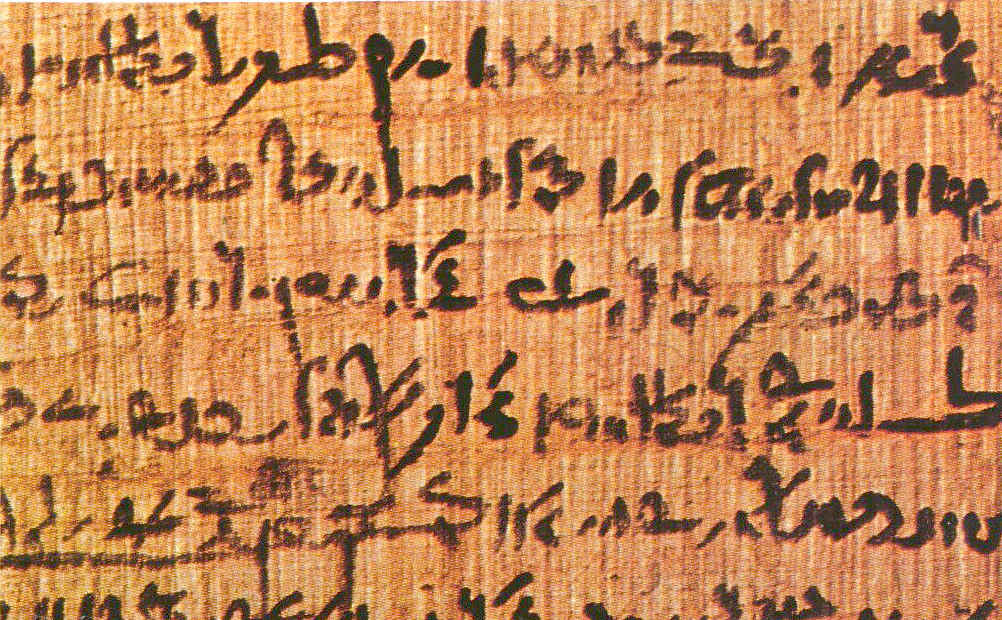
  Papyrus (P. BM EA 10591 recto column IX, beginning of lines 13–17)
- Parchment — Writing on prepared animal skins had a long history, however. David Diringer noted that "the first mention of Egyptian documents written on leather goes back to the Fourth Dynasty (c. 2550–2450 BC), but the earliest of such documents extant are: a fragmentary roll of leather of the Sixth Dynasty (c. 24th century BC), unrolled by Dr. H. Ibscher, and preserved in the Cairo Museum; a roll of the Twelfth Dynasty (c. 1990–1777 BC) now in Berlin; the mathematical text now in the British Museum (MS. 10250); and a document of the reign of Ramses II (early thirteenth century BC)."
- Pens and reed pens – Ancient Egyptians had developed writing on papyrus scrolls when scribes used thin reed brushes or reed pens from the Juncus maritimus or sea rush. In his book A History of Writing, Steven Roger Fischer suggests that on the basis of finds at Saqqara, the reed pen might well have been used for writing on parchment as long ago as the First Dynasty or about 3000 BC.
- Plumb bob — The plumb bob has been used since at least the time of ancient Egypt
- Pulley — The earliest evidence of pulleys date back to Ancient Egypt in the Twelfth Dynasty (1991–1802 BCE)
- Protractors — Found the tomb of architect Kha.
- Ramps and inclined planes – The Egyptian pyramids were constructed using inclined planes,
- Razor — Excavations in Egypt have unearthed solid gold and copper razors in tombs dating back to the 4th millennium BC.
- Rope stretcher — a rope stretcher (or harpedonaptai) was a surveyor who measured real property demarcations and foundations using knotted cords, stretched so the rope did not sag. The practice is depicted in tomb paintings of the Theban Necropolis. rope-stretching itself, are attested over 3000 years from the early dynastic period to the Ptolemaic kingdom.
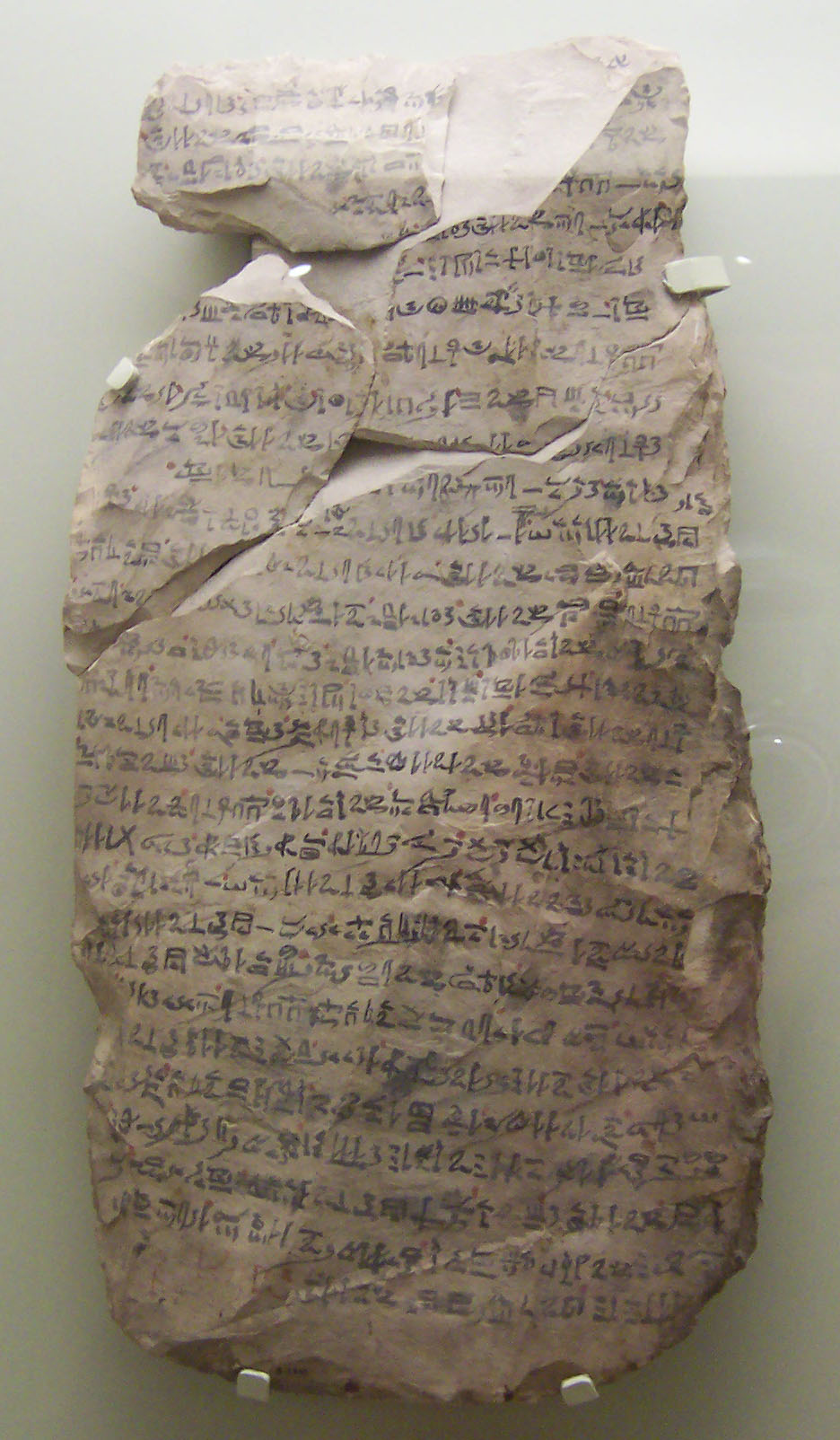
  One of four official letters to vizier Khay copied onto a limestone ostracon, in Egyptian Hieratic
- Saw — In ancient Egypt, open (unframed) saws made of copper are documented as early as the Early Dynastic Period, circa 3,100–2,686 BC. Many copper saws were found in tomb No. 3471 dating to the reign of Djer in the 31st century BC. Saws have been used for cutting a variety of materials, including humans (death by sawing). Models of saws have been found in many contexts throughout Egyptian history. Particularly useful are tomb wall illustrations of carpenters at work that show sizes and the use of different types. Egyptian saws were at first serrated, hardened copper which cut on both pull and push strokes. As the saw developed, teeth were raked to cut only on the pull stroke and set with the teeth projecting only on one side, rather than in the modern fashion with an alternating set. Saws were also made of bronze and later iron.
- Scissors —
- Screw pump — The screw pump is the oldest positive displacement pump. The first records of a water screw, or screw pump, dates back to Ancient Egypt before the 3rd century BC. The Egyptian screw, used to lift water from the Nile, was composed of tubes wound round a cylinder; as the entire unit rotates, water is lifted within the spiral tube to the higher elevation. A later screw pump design from Egypt had a spiral groove cut on the outside of a solid wooden cylinder and then the cylinder was covered by boards or sheets of metal closely covering the surfaces between the grooves.
- Set square — Found the tomb of architect Kha.
- Siphon — Ancient Egyptian reliefs from 1500 BC depict siphons used to extract liquids from large storage jars.
- Spoon — Preserved examples of various forms of spoons used by the ancient Egyptians include those composed of ivory, flint, slate and wood; many of them carved with religious symbols.
- Tweezers — Tweezers are known to have been used in predynastic Egypt.
- Water clock — The oldest water clock of which there is physical evidence dates to c. 1417–1379 BC, during the reign of Amenhotep III where it was used in the Temple of Amen-Re at Karnak. The oldest documentation of the water clock is the tomb inscription of the 16th century BC Egyptian court official Amenemhet, which identifies him as its inventor.
- Weighing scale — The oldest attested evidence for the existence of weighing scales dates to the Fourth Dynasty of Egypt, with Deben (unit) balance weights, from the reign of Sneferu (c. 2600 BC) excavated, though earlier usage has been proposed.
- Wig – In Egyptian society men and women commonly had clean shaven or close cropped hair and often wore wigs. The ancient Egyptians created the wig to shield shaved, hairless heads from the sun. They also wore the wigs on top of their hair using beeswax and resin to keep the wigs in place. Wealthy Egyptians would wear elaborate wigs and scented cones of animal fat on top of their wigs.

==== Furniture ====
Furniture became common first in Ancient Egypt during the Naqada culture. During that period a wide variety of furniture pieces were invented and used.

- Camp bed — It is believed that King Tut, who reigned in Egypt from approximately 1332 to 1323 BC, may have had the first camping bed. When Tutankhamun's tomb was opened in 1922 a room full of furniture was found to contain a three-section camping bed that folded up into a Z shape.Though the frail young king, who had a clubfoot, may never have taken part in long-distance explorations, the elaborate folding bed suggests he had an interest in camping and hunting.
- Chairs – Chairs were in existence since at least the Early Dynastic Period of Egypt (c. 3100 BC). They were covered with cloth or leather, were made of carved wood, and were much lower than today's chairs – chair seats were sometimes only 10 inches (25 cm) high.
- Chest — The Ancient Egyptians created the first known chests, using wood or woven reeds, circa 3000 BC.
- Tables – Some very early tables were made and used by the ancient Egyptians around 2500 BC, using wood and alabaster. They were often little more than stone platforms used to keep objects off the floor, though a few examples of wooden tables have been found in tombs. Food and drinks were usually put on large plates deposed on a pedestal for eating. The Egyptians made use of various small tables and elevated playing boards.

=== Arts and architecture ===
==== Architecture ====
- Capital — The two earliest Egyptian capitals of importance are those based on the lotus and papyrus plants.
- Cavetto — Ancient Egyptian architecture made special use of large cavetto mouldings as a cornice, with only a short fillet (plain vertical face) above, and a torus moulding (convex semi-circle) below. This cavetto cornice is sometimes also known as an "Egyptian cornice", "hollow and roll" or "gorge cornice", and has been suggested to be a reminiscence in stone architecture of the primitive use of bound bunches of reeds as supports for buildings, the weight of the roof bending their tops out.
- Column — In ancient Egyptian architecture as early as 2600 BC, the architect Imhotep made use of stone columns whose surface was carved to reflect the organic form of bundled reeds, like papyrus, lotus and palm. In later Egyptian architecture faceted cylinders were also common. Their form is thought to derive from archaic reed-built shrines. Carved from stone, the columns were highly decorated with carved and painted hieroglyphs, texts, ritual imagery and natural motifs. Egyptian columns are famously present in the Great Hypostyle Hall of Karnak (circa 1224 BC), where 134 columns are lined up in sixteen rows, with some columns reaching heights of 24 metres.
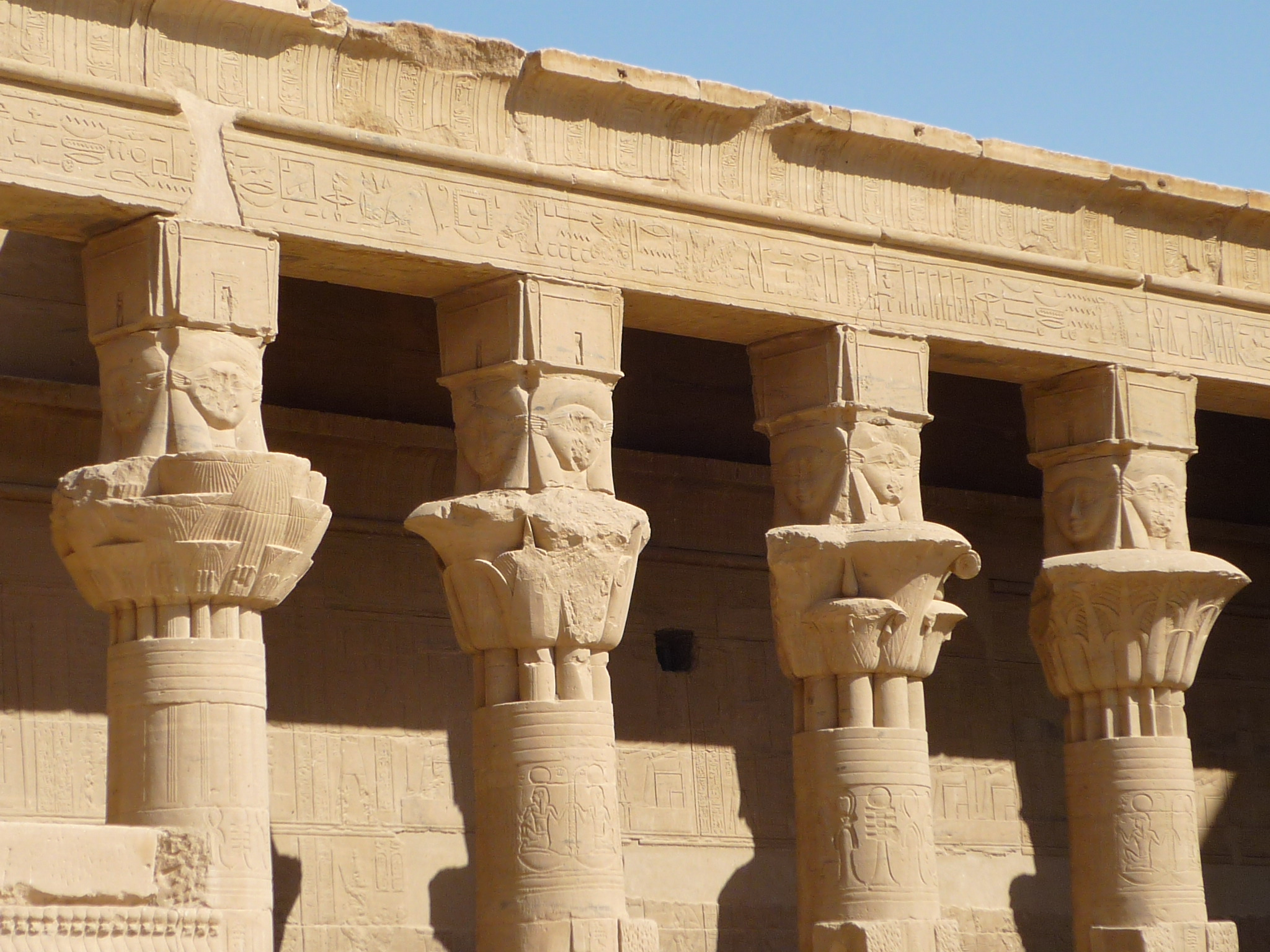
  Columns with Hathoric capitals
- Corbel arch — Corbelling is a technique first applied by the ancient Egyptians and Chaldeans. During the Fourth Dynasty reign of Pharaoh Sneferu (c. 2600 BC), the Ancient Egyptian pyramids used corbel vaults in some of their chambers.
- Gardens – Gardens appeared in Egypt during the Old Kingdom. There were many types of gardens in Ancient Egypt such as: pleasure gardens, palace gardens, temple gardens and funerary gardens.
- Hypostyle architecture
- Mastaba — a predecessor to the Egyptian pyramid. Kings of the Early Dynastic Period were buried there.
- Obelisk — The earliest temple obelisk still in its original position is the 68-foot (20.7 m) 120-metric-ton (130-short-ton) red granite Obelisk of Senusret I of the XIIth Dynasty at Al-Matariyyah in modern Heliopolis.
- Pylon — Pylons were often decorated with scenes emphasizing a king's authority since it was the public face of a cult building. On the first pylon of the temple of Isis at Philae, the pharaoh is shown slaying his enemies while Isis, Horus and Hathor look on. Other examples of pylons can be seen in Karnak, Luxor, and Edfu.
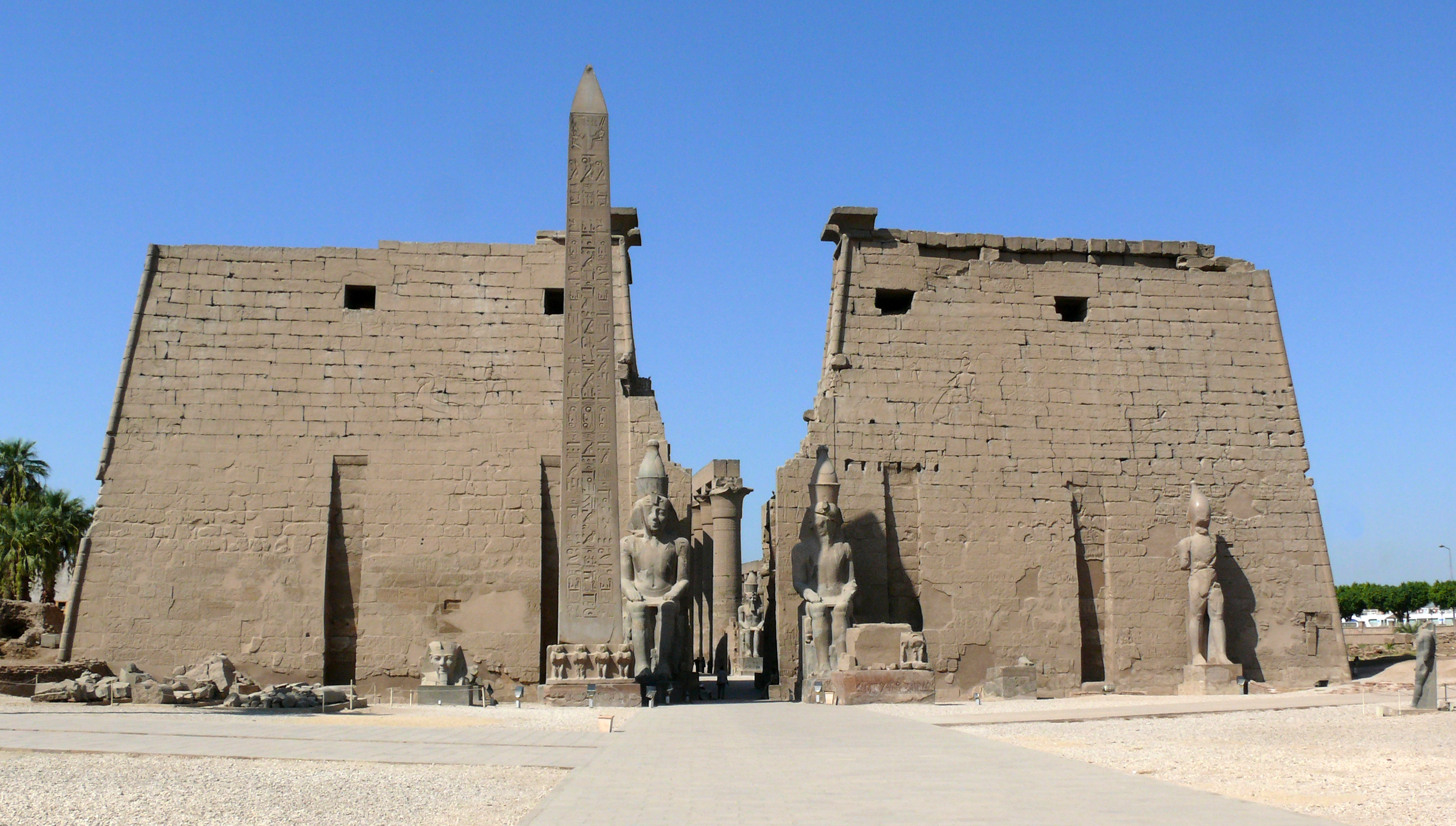
  Pylon of the Temple of Luxor with the remaining obelisk (of two) in front (the second is in the Place de la Concorde in Paris).

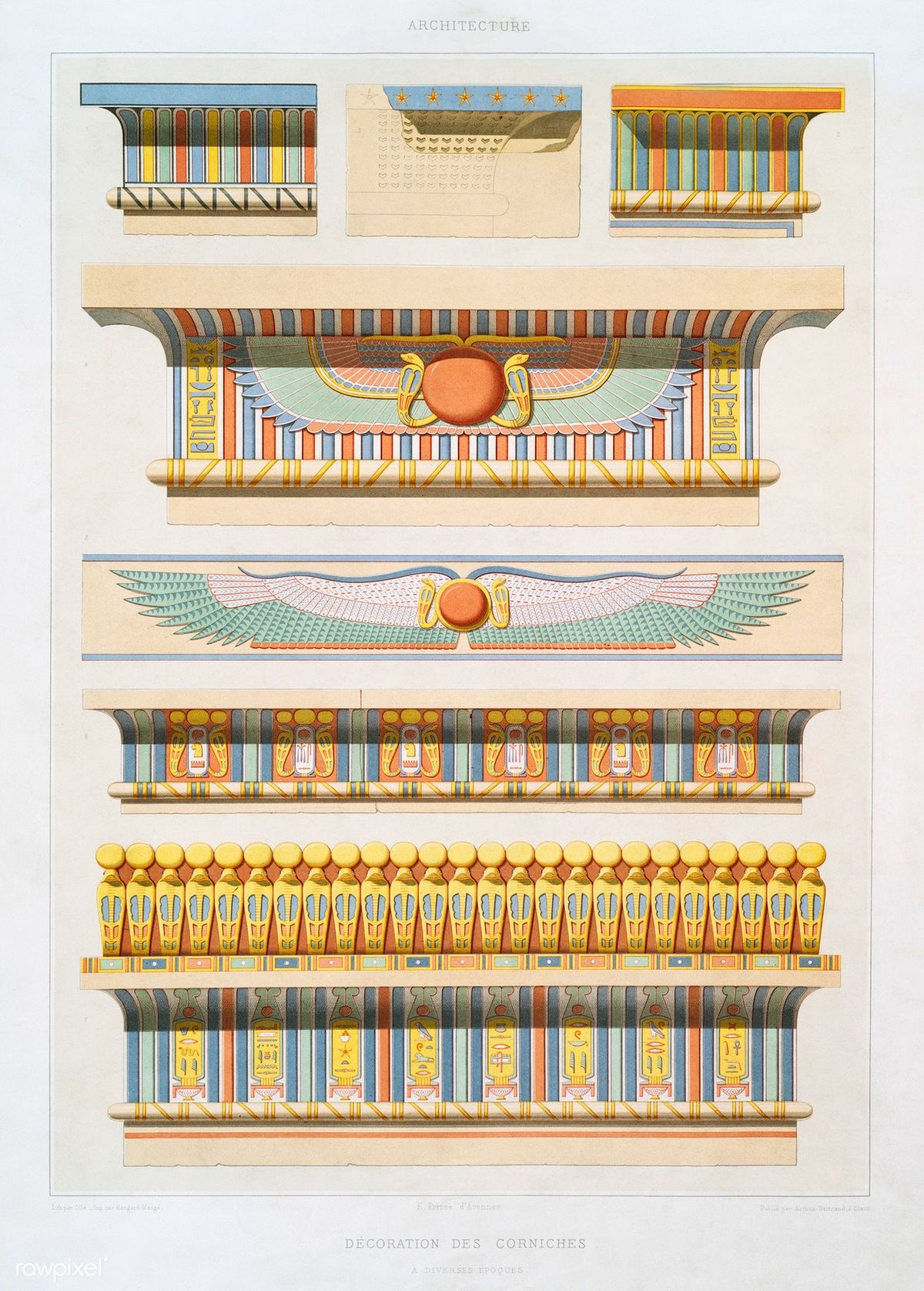
Illustrations of various examples of ancient Egyptian cornices, all of them having cavettos

- Windcatcher — Windcatchers were used in traditional ancient Egyptian architecture from the very early historical times, and only started to fall out of use in the mid-1900s CE.

==== Crafts ====
- Cosmetic palette
- Egyptian faience
- Hollow glass production and glassware — Egypt and Mesopotamia were the first civilizations to produce glass works(3,500 BC.). The oldest specimens of glass are from Egypt and date back to 2000 BC In 1500BC the industry was well established in Egypt.
- Synthetic pigment — The first known synthetic pigment was Egyptian blue, which is first attested on an alabaster bowl in Egypt dated to Naqada III (circa 3250 BC). Egyptian blue (blue frit), calcium copper silicate CaCuSi_{4}O_{10}, made by heating a mixture of quartz sand, lime, a flux and a copper source, such as malachite. Already invented in the Predynastic Period of Egypt, its use became widespread by the 4th Dynasty. It was the blue pigment par excellence of Roman antiquity; its art technological traces vanished in the course of the Middle Ages until its rediscovery in the context of the Egyptian campaign and the excavations in Pompeii and Herculaneum.

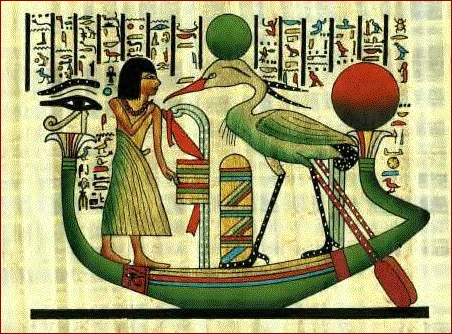
Painting on papyrus

- Tapestry — The earliest known tapestry weave pieces using linen were found in the tombs of both Thutmose IV (d. 1391 or 1388 BC) and Tutankhamen (c. 1323 BC), the latter a glove and a robe.
- Watercolor paper — Painting on Papyrus was invented in Ancient Egypt long before the invention of Paper.
- Wood carving and Wooden statues – The extreme dryness of the climate of Egypt accounts for the existence of a number of woodcarvings from this remote period. Some wood panels from the tomb of Hosul Egypt, at Saqqara are of the Third Dynasty. The carving consists of Egyptian hieroglyphs and figures in low relief, and the style is extremely delicate and fine. A stool shown on one of the panels has the legs shaped like the fore and hind limbs of an animal, a form common in Egypt for thousands of years.
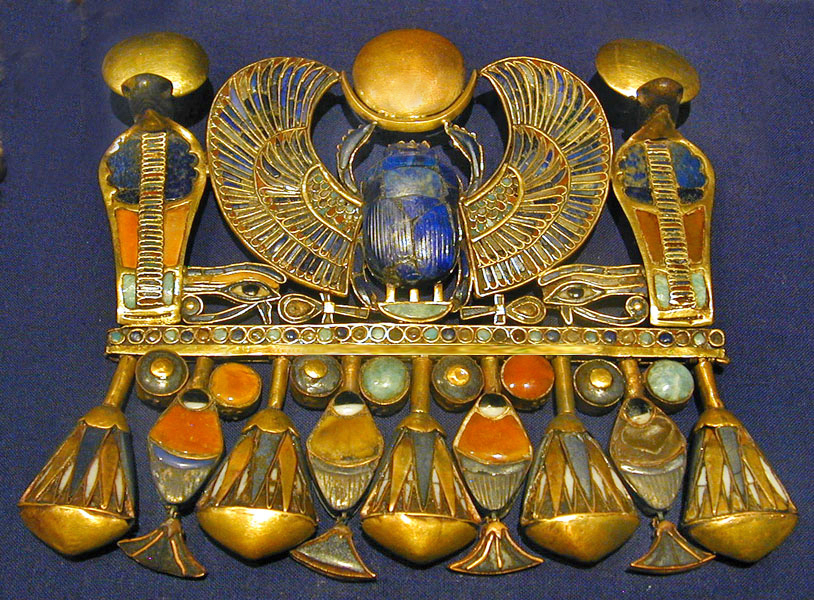
  Hieroglyphs: ankh, basket, Eye of Horus, Sun Disk-(Gard. N5)

==== Music and dance ====
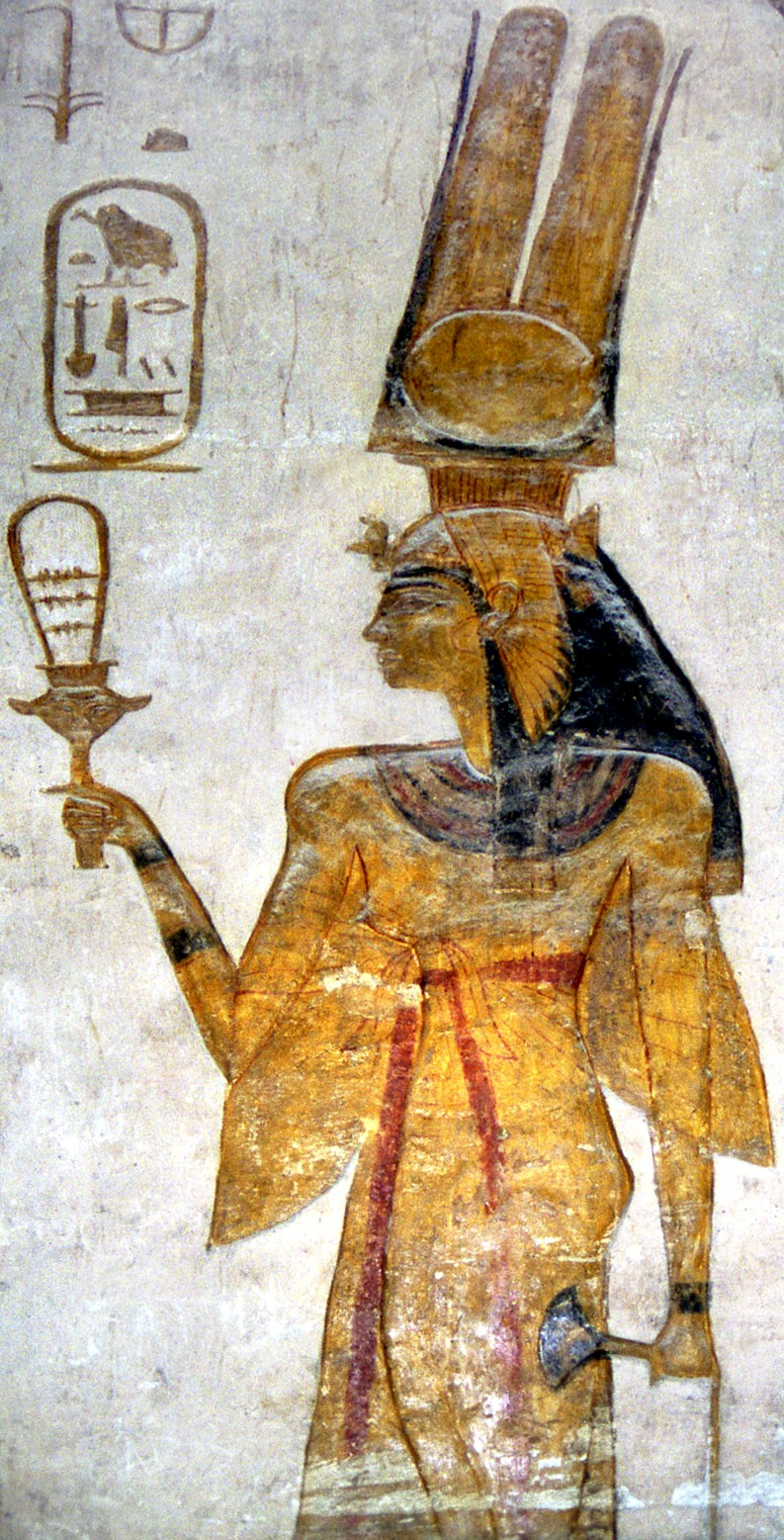
Nefertari, wife of Ramesses II, holding a sistrum

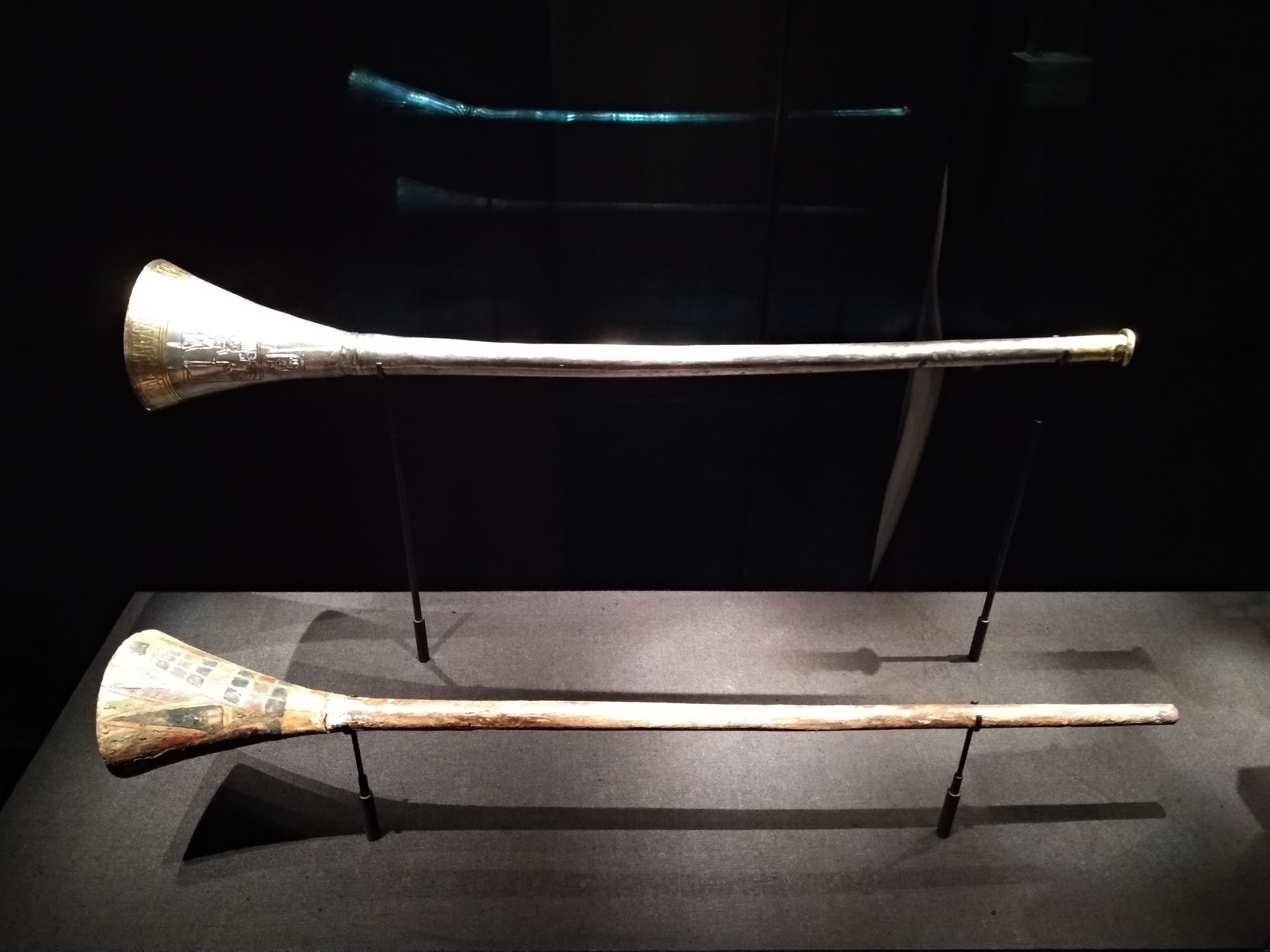
Silver and gold plated trumpet and its wooden mute from the tomb of Tutankhamun (1326–1336 BC)

- Belly dance- The earliest evidence of belly dance has been originated in ancient Egypt."
- Melisma — According to Demetrius of Falorene (3rd century A.D), the Egyptian priests used to praise the gods by singing 7 vowels successively producing sweet sounds. This is the first mention of the melisma which is used in many of the Coptic hymns today.
- Sistrum — The sistrum was a sacred instrument in ancient Egypt. Perhaps originating in the worship of Bastet, it was used in dances and religious ceremonies, particularly in the worship of the goddess Hathor, with the U-shape of the sistrum's handle and frame seen as resembling the face and horns of the cow goddess.
- Syllabtic music style — The Syllabtic music style had been used for 2000 years in the coptic church "Tasbe7a".

==== Literature ====
- Epistle — The ancient Egyptians wrote epistles, most often for pedagogical reasons. Egyptologist Edward Wente (1990) speculates that the Fifth Dynasty Pharaoh Djedkare Isesi (in his many letters sent to his viziers) was a pioneer in the epistolary genre.

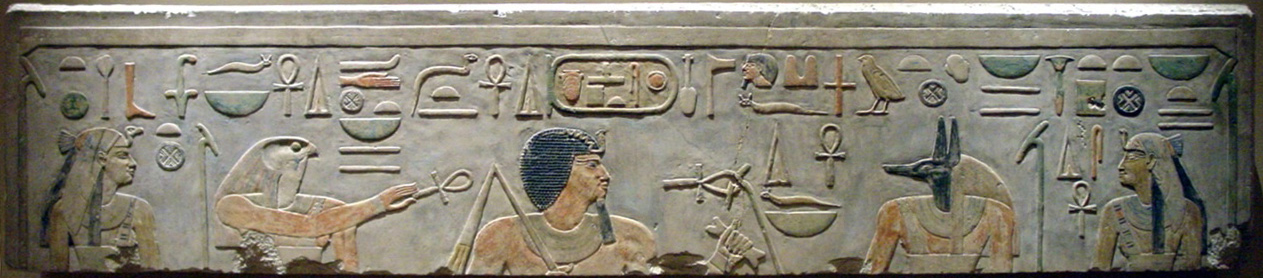
A raised-relief depiction of Amenemhat I accompanied by deities; the death of Amenemhat I is reported by his son Senusret I in the Story of Sinuhe.

- Satire – One of the earliest examples of what we might call satire, The Satire of the Trades, is in Egyptian writing from the beginning of the 2nd millennium BC. The text's apparent readers are students, tired of studying. It argues that their lot as scribes is not only useful, but far superior to that of the ordinary man. Scholars such as Helck think that the context was meant to be serious. The Papyrus Anastasi I (late 2nd millennium BC) contains a satirical letter which first praises the virtues of its recipient, but then mocks the reader's meagre knowledge and achievements.
- Sebayt and wisdom literature — The Maxims of Ptahhotep are among the oldest pieces of wisdom literature. It was compiled during the 24th century BC.
- Short story – short story started in Ancient Egypt around 2000 BC. Among the oldest known stories the "Story of Sinuhe" and the "Tale of the Shipwrecked Sailor".
- Written records – The Ancient Egyptian sentence found in the tomb of Seth-Peribsen is the world's oldest known sentence

=== Sports ===
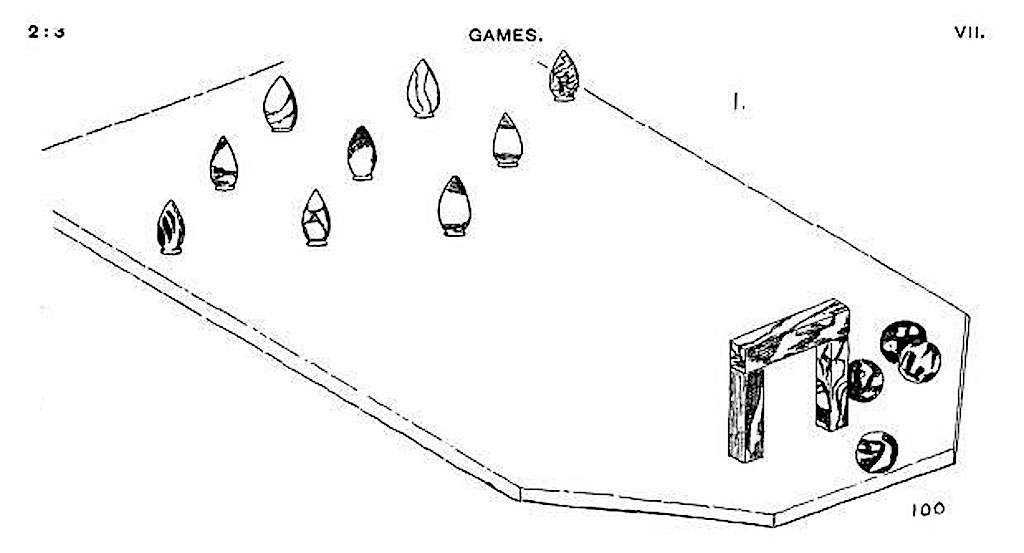
Archeologist's drawing of items found in 1895 in an ancient tomb in Naqada, Egypt, thought to resemble the more modern game of skittles. The archeologist conjectured as to the particular arrangement of the items found.

- Bowling — The earliest known forms of bowling date back to ancient Egypt, with wall drawings depicting bowling being found in a royal Egyptian tomb dated to 5200 B.C. and miniature pins and balls in an Egyptian child's grave about 5200 B.C. Remnants of bowling balls were found among artifacts in ancient Egypt going back to the Egyptian protodynastic period in 3200 BC. What is thought to be a child's game involving porphyry (stone) balls, a miniature trilithon, and nine breccia-veined alabaster vase-shaped figures—thought to resemble the more modern game of skittles—was found in Naqada, Egypt in 1895.
- Equilibrium (sport)
- Fencing — The first historical evidence from archaeology of a fencing contest was found on the wall of a temple within Egypt built at a time dated to approximately 1190 B.C.
- Gymnastics – Ancient Egyptians were the first to play gymnastics. They even developed three types of gymnastics: rhythmic gymnastics, consecutive vault and floor gymnastics.
- High jump
- Hockey — Drawings on tombs at Beni Hassan in Menia Governorate show players holding bats made of long palm-tree branches, with a bent end similar to that of the hockey bat. The hockey ball was made of compressed papyrus fibers covered with two pieces of leather in the shape of a semicircle.
- Tahtib — The oldest traces of tahtib were found on engravings from the archaeological site of Abusir, an extensive necropolis of the Old Kingdom period, located in the south-western suburbs of Cairo. On some of the reliefs of the Pyramid of Sahure (V dynasty, c. 2500 BC); the images and explanatory captions are particularly precise and accurate in their depiction of what seems to be military training using sticks. Tahtib, with archery and wrestling, was then among the three disciplines of warfare taught to soldiers.
- Tug of war — This sport was practiced in the country side.
- Tug of hoop

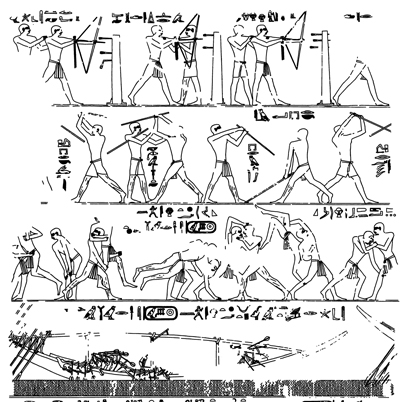
Engravings at the Abusir necropolis showing scenes of archery, wrestling, and stick fighting

- Weightlifting — Weightlifting was first recorded in ancient Egypt. One method of weightlifting was lifting a heavy sack of sand with one hand and keep it high in a vertical position. The player had to hold that sack of sand for some time and stay in the same position. This rule is still applied in the modern weightlifting.

=== Cuisine ===
- Banquet — Depictions of banquets can be found in paintings from both the Old Kingdom and New Kingdom. They usually started sometime in the afternoon. Men and women were separated unless they were married. Seating varied according to social status, with those of the highest status sitting on chairs, those slightly lower sat on stools and those lowest in rank sat on the raw floor. Before the food was served, basins were provided along with aromatics and cones of scented fat were lit to spread pleasant smells or to repel insects, depending on the type.
- Boiled eggs — In Thebes, Egypt, the tomb of Haremhab, dating to approximately 1420 BCE, shows a depiction of a man carrying bowls of ostrich eggs and other large eggs, presumably those of the pelican, as offerings. In ancient Rome, eggs were preserved using a number of methods and meals often started with an egg course.
- Egyptian cheese — Archaeological evidence for making cheese in Egypt goes back about 5,000 years. In 2018, archeologists from Cairo University and the University of Catania reported the discovery of the oldest known cheese from Egypt. Discovered in the Saqqara necropolis, it is around 3200 years old. Earlier, remains identified as cheese were found in the funeral meal in an Egyptian tomb dating around 2900 BC. Visual evidence of Egyptian cheesemaking was found in Egyptian tomb murals in approximately 2000 BC.
- Foie gras and force-feeding — The technique of gavage dates as far back as 2500 BC, when the ancient Egyptians began keeping birds for food and deliberately fattened the birds through force-feeding. Today, France is by far the largest producer and consumer of foie gras, though it is produced and consumed worldwide, particularly in other European nations, the United States, and China.
- Frying — Frying is believed to have first appeared in the ancient Egyptian kitchen, during the Old Kingdom, around 2500 BCE.
- Hardtack and biscuits — versions using various grains date back to Ancient Rome, and as far back as Ancient Egypt.
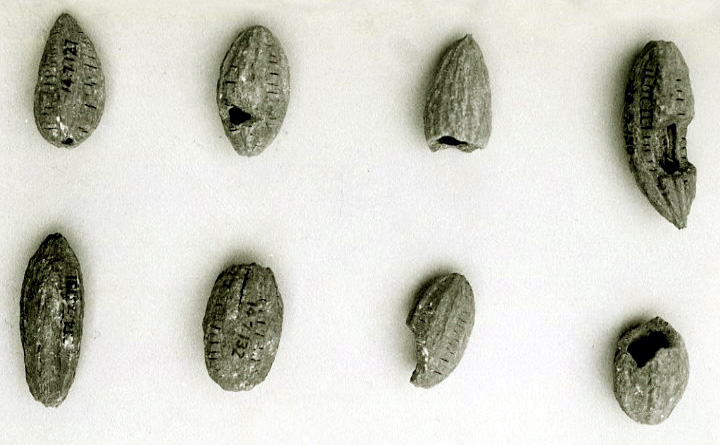
  Fruits of Balanites aegyptiaca from Saqqara. Mastaba of Perneb, 5th dynasty of Egypt. MET.
- Lettuce – Lettuce was first cultivated in ancient Egypt for the production of oil from its seeds. This plant was probably selectively bred by the Egyptians into a plant grown for its edible leaves, with evidence of its cultivation appearing as early as 2680 BC. Lettuce was considered a sacred plant of the reproduction god Min, and it was carried during his festivals and placed near his images. The plant was thought to help the god "perform the sexual act untiringly." Its use in religious ceremonies resulted in the creation of many images in tombs and wall paintings. The cultivated variety appears to have been about 75 cm (30 in) tall and resembled a large version of the modern romaine lettuce. These upright lettuces were developed by the Egyptians and passed to the Greeks, who in turn shared them with the Romans.
- Marshmallows — The first marshmallows were produced in Egypt around 2000 B.c. and were made by mixing Mallow sap, honey, grains and baked into cakes. Marshmallows were only served to the Gods of Ancient Egypt and pharaohs, as a candy or a dessert.
- Pies – Early pies were in the form of flat, round or freeform crusty cakes called galettes consisting of a crust of ground oats, wheat, rye, or barley containing honey inside. These galettes developed into a form of early sweet pastry or desserts, evidence of which can be found on the tomb walls of the Pharaoh Ramesses II, who ruled from 1304 to 1237 BC, located in the Valley of the Kings.
- Smy – thickened milk (Note: "Smy, or thickened milk, both human and animal, is often mentioned in medical prescriptions.") documented as existent in ancient Egypt.
- Yeast — The earliest definite records of yeast come from Ancient Egypt.

=== Clothing and cosmetics ===
- Flip-flops — Thong sandals have been worn for thousands of years, dating back to pictures of them in ancient Egyptian murals from 4,000 BC. Ancient Egyptian sandals were made from papyrus and palm leaves.
- Gloves – Depicted in an Egyptian tomb dating to the 5th dynasty.
- Hair gel — Analysis of ancient Egyptian mummies has shown that they styled their hair using a fat-based gel. The researchers behind the analysis say that the Egyptians used the product to ensure that their style stayed in place in both life and death. Natalie McCreesh, an archaeological scientist from the KNH Centre for Biomedical Egyptology at the University of Manchester, England, and her colleagues studied hair samples taken from 18 mummies. The oldest is approximately 3,500 years old, but most were excavated from a cemetery in the Dakhleh Oasis in the Western Desert and date from Greco-Roman times, around 2,300 years ago.
- Hairpin — Hairpins made of metal, ivory, bronze, carved wood, etc. were used in ancient Egypt for securing decorated hairstyles. Such hairpins suggest, as graves show, that many were luxury objects among the Egyptians and later the Greeks, Etruscans, and Romans.
- Henna and hair dye — Ancient Egyptian, Ahmose-Henuttamehu (17th Dynasty, 1574 BCE): was probably a daughter of Seqenenre Tao and Ahmose Inhapy: Smith reports that the mummy of Henuttamehu's own hair had been dyed a bright red at the sides, probably with henna.
- High-heeled shoe — Paintings circa 3,500 BC. show images of men and women wearing high-heeled shoes. High-heeled shoes was also used by butchers to make them move easily over the dead animals.
- Kohl — Worn during Naqada III era (c. 3100 BCE) by Egyptians of all social classes, originally as protection against eye ailments.
- Liniment — made from castor oil.
- Makeup – The origin of cosmetics such as rouge, eye shadow, etc. dates back to pre-dynastic Egypt.
- Quilting — The earliest known quilted garment is depicted on the carved ivory figure of a Pharaoh dating from the ancient Egyptian First Dynasty (c. 3400 BC).
- Shirt – The world's oldest preserved garment, discovered by Flinders Petrie, is a "highly sophisticated" linen shirt from a First Dynasty Egyptian tomb at Tarkan, dated to c. 3000 BC: "the shoulders and sleeves have been finely pleated to give form-fitting trimness while allowing the wearer room to move. The small fringe formed during weaving along one edge of the cloth has been placed by the designer to decorate the neck opening and side seam."
- Umbrella — the earliest known parasols in Ancient Egyptian art date back to the Fifth Dynasty, around 2450 BC. The parasol is found in various shapes. In some instances it is depicted as a flabellum, a fan of palm-leaves or coloured feathers fixed on a long handle, resembling those now carried behind the Pope in processions.

=== Others ===
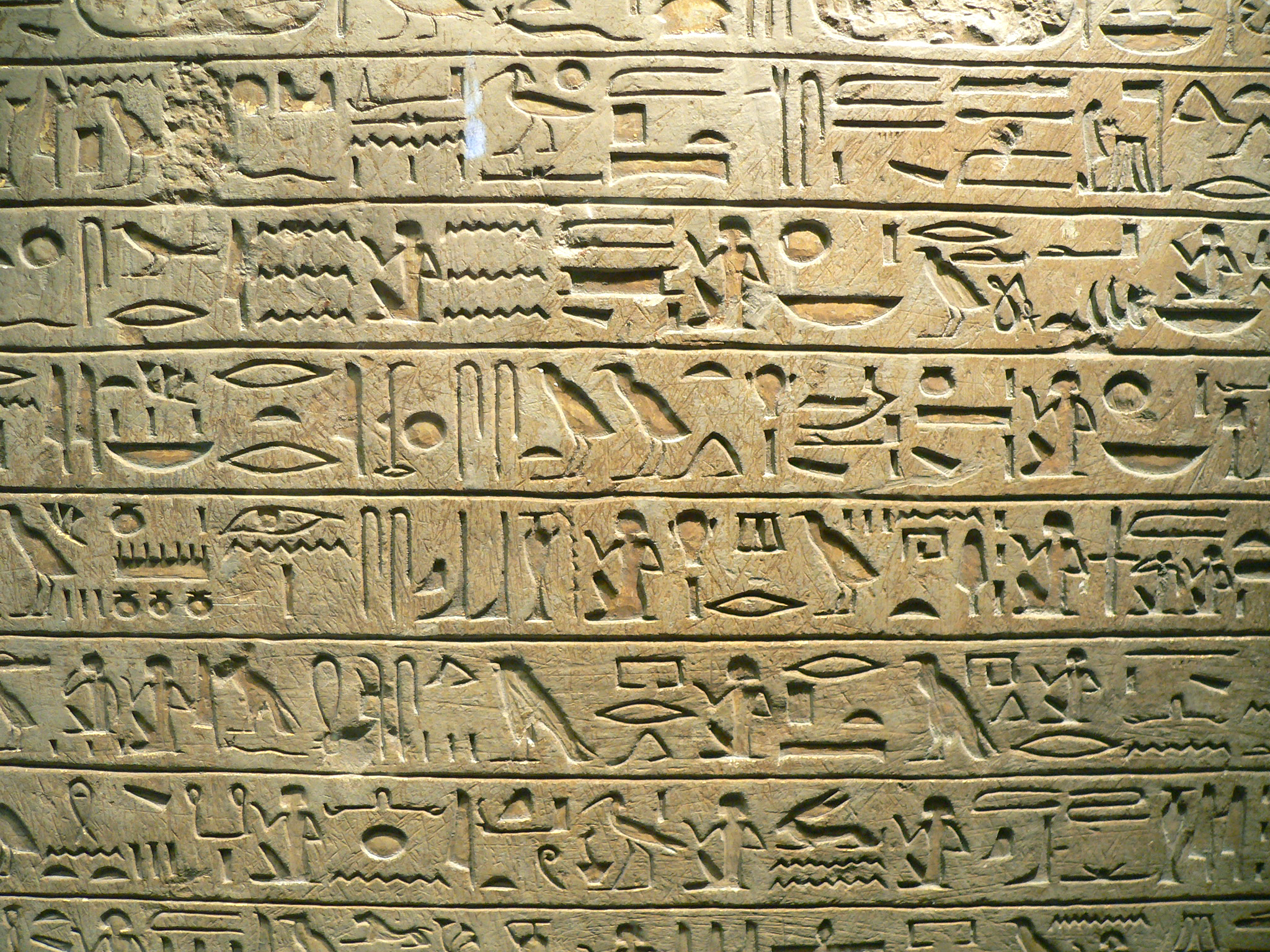
Hieroglyphs on stela in Louvre, circa 1321 BC

- Alphabet — The history of the alphabet started in ancient Egypt. Egyptian writing had a set of some 24 hieroglyphs that are called uniliterals, to represent syllables that begin with a single consonant of their language, plus a vowel (or no vowel) to be supplied by the native speaker. These glyphs were used as pronunciation guides for logograms, to write grammatical inflections, and, later, to transcribe loan words and foreign names. In the Middle Bronze Age, an apparently "alphabetic" system known as the Proto-Sinaitic script appears in Egyptian turquoise mines in the Sinai Peninsula dated to circa the 15th century BC, apparently left by Canaanite workers. In 1999, John and Deborah Darnell discovered an even earlier version of this first alphabet at Wadi el-Hol dated to circa 1800 BC and showing evidence of having been adapted from specific forms of Egyptian hieroglyphs that could be dated to circa 2000 BC, strongly suggesting that the first alphabet had been developed about that time. Based on letter appearances and names, it is believed to be based on Egyptian hieroglyphs. This script had no characters representing vowels, although originally it probably was a syllabary, but unneeded symbols were discarded.
- Board games / Senet — Senet, found in Predynastic and First Dynasty burials of Egypt, c. 3500 BC and 3100 BC respectively, is the oldest board game known to have existed. Senet was pictured in a fresco found in Merknera's tomb (3300–2700 BC).
- Egyptian hieroglyphs — Hieroglyphic symbol systems developed in the second half of the 4th millennium BC, such as the clay labels of a Predynastic ruler called "Scorpion I" (Naqada IIIA period, c. 33rd century BC) recovered at Abydos (modern Umm el-Qa'ab) in 1998 or the Narmer Palette (c. 31st century BC).
- Hieratic — Hieratic developed as a cursive form of hieroglyphic script in the Naqada III period, roughly 3200–3000 BCE.
- Histiography and King lists – The pharaohs of Egypt used to glorify their ancestors. The Den seal impressions is the oldest King list in the world dating to 3000 BC. The Palermo Stone is one of seven surviving fragments of a stele known as the Royal Annals of the Old Kingdom of Ancient Egypt. The stele contained a list of the kings of Egypt from the First Dynasty (~3150–2890 BCE) through to the early part of the Fifth Dynasty (approx 2392–2283 BCE) and noted significant events in each year of their reigns. It was probably made during the Fifth Dynasty. These inscriptions are considered as the oldest History studies.

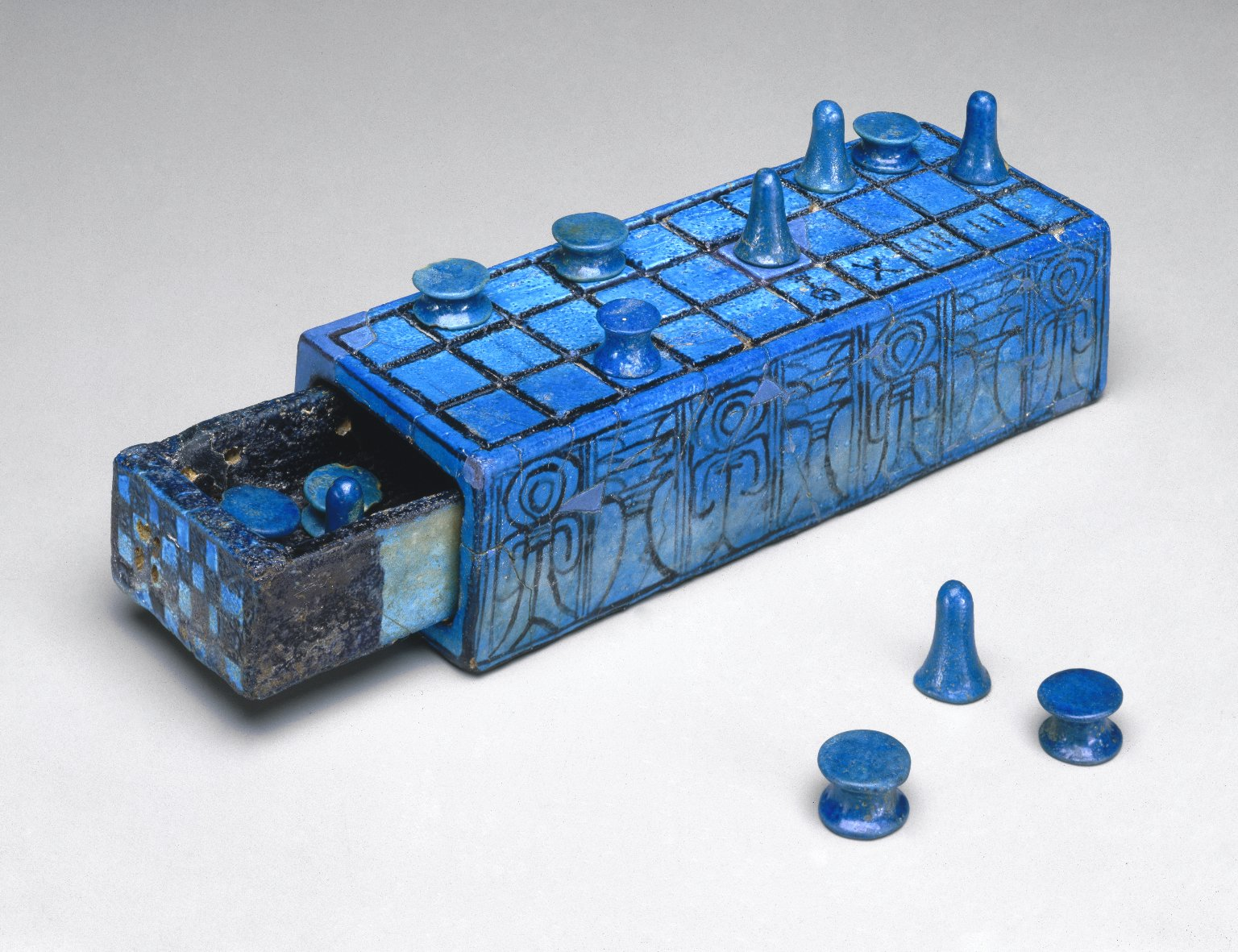
Senet gaming board inscribed for Amenhotep III with separate sliding drawer, c. 1390–1353 BC

- Logbooks – The Diary of Merer (Papyrus Jarf A and B) is the name for papyrus logbooks written over 4,500 years ago that record the daily activities of stone transportation from the Tura limestone quarry to and from Giza during the 4th Dynasty. They are the oldest known papyri with text. The text was found in 2013 by a French mission under the direction of archaeologists Pierre Tallet of Paris-Sorbonne University and Gregory Marouard in a cave in Wadi al-Jarf on the Red Sea coast.
- Mehen — Evidence of the game of Mehen is found from the Predynastic period dating from approximately 3000 BC and continues until the end of the Old Kingdom, around 2300 BC.
- Monotheism — The earliest known instance of monotheism appeared in 14th century BC Egypt during the reign of Akhenaten.
- Sarcophagus — The earliest stone sarcophagi were used by Egyptian pharaohs of the 3rd dynasty, which reigned from about 2686 to 2613 B.C.
- School – Perhaps the earliest formal school was developed in Egypt's Middle Kingdom under the direction of Kheti, treasurer to Mentuhotep II (2061–2010 BC).
- Sick leave — Already in 1500 BCE, at least some of the workers who built the tombs of Egyptian pharaohs received paid sick leave as well as state-supported health care.
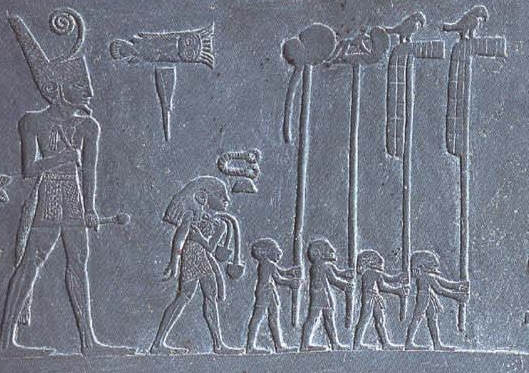
  A detail from the Narmer Palette, with the oldest known depiction of vexilloids.
- Strike action – The first historically certain account of strike action was towards the end of the 20th Dynasty, under Pharaoh Ramses III in ancient Egypt on 14 November in 1152 BC. The artisans of the Royal Necropolis at Deir el-Medina walked off their jobs because they had not been paid.
- Tobacco pipe
- Vexilloid — The oldest known vexilloids appear as depictions on Egyptian pottery from the Gerzeh culture and on the reverse of the Narmer Palette. These vexilloids were symbols of the nomes of pre-dynastic Egypt.
- Writing – writing first arose in Egypt around 3300 BC, contemporaneous with Mesopotamia or may predate it.

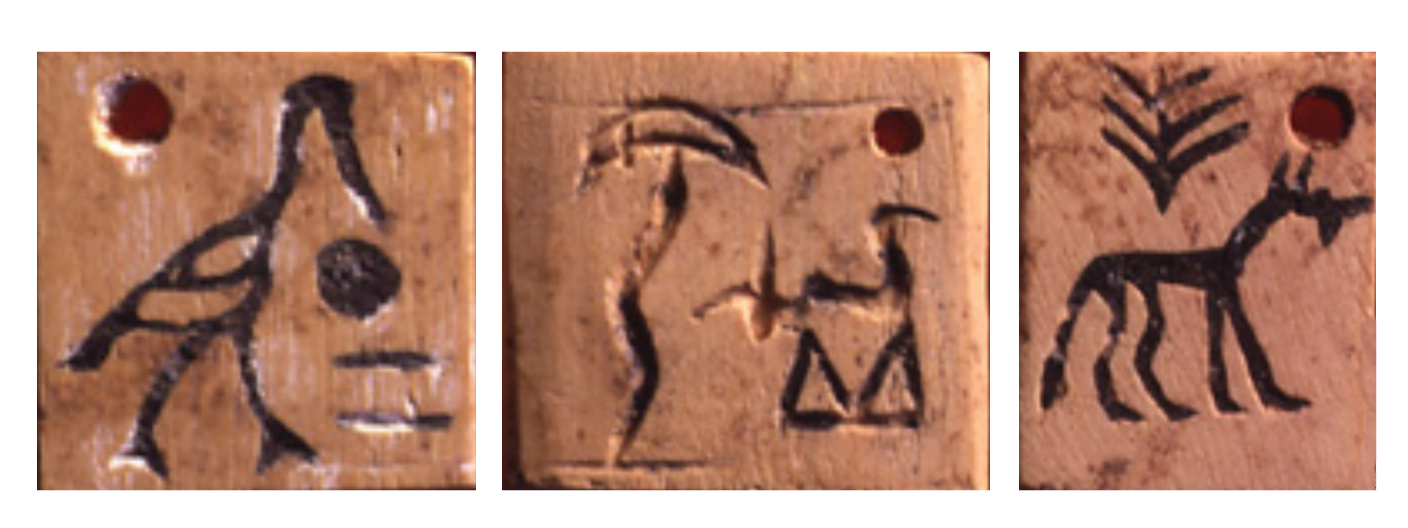
Designs on some of the labels or token from Abydos, carbon-dated to circa 3400–3200 BC and among the earliest form of writing in Egypt. They are virtually similar to contemporary clay tags from Uruk, Mesopotamia.

== Graeco-Roman era ==
=== Hero of Alexandria ===
A triangle with sides a, b, and c.

Sources:

- Automatic door — In the 1st century AD, mathematician Heron of Alexandria in Roman Egypt invented the first known automatic door. He described two different automatic door applications. The first application used heat from a fire lit by the city's temple priest. After a few hours atmospheric pressure built up in a brass vessel causing it to pump water into adjacent containers. These containers acted as weights that, through a series of ropes and pulleys, would open the temple's doors at about the time people were to arrive for prayer. Heron used a similar application to open the gates to the city.
- Force pump — The force pump was widely used in the Roman world, and one application was in a fire-engine.
- Heron's formula — Hero described a method for iteratively computing the square root of a number. Today, however, his name is most closely associated with Heron's formula for finding the area of a triangle from its side lengths.
- He also devised a method for calculating cube roots in the 1st century AD. He also designed a shortest path algorithm, Given two points A and B on one side of a line, find C a point on the straight line, that minimizes AC+BC.
- Heron's fountain — A standalone fountain that operates under self-contained hydro-static energy; now called Heron's fountain.
- In optics, Hero formulated the principle of the shortest path of light: If a ray of light propagates from point A to point B within the same medium, the path-length followed is the shortest possible. In his Catoptrics (1st century CE), he showed that the ordinary law of reflection off a plane surface follows from the premise that the total length of the ray path is a minimum. It was nearly 1000 years later that Alhacen expanded the principle to both reflection and refraction, and the principle was later stated in this form by Pierre de Fermat in 1662; the most modern form is that the optical path is stationary.
- A wind-wheel operating an organ, marking the first instance in history of wind powering a machine.
- Hero also invented many mechanisms for the Greek theater, including an entirely mechanical play almost ten minutes in length, powered by a binary-like system of ropes, knots, and simple machines operated by a rotating cylindrical cogwheel. The sound of thunder was produced by the mechanically timed dropping of metal balls onto a hidden drum.
- A programmable cart that was powered by a falling weight. The "program" consisted of strings wrapped around the drive axle.
- Vending machine — The first vending machine was also one of his constructions; when a coin was introduced via a slot on the top of the machine, a set amount of holy water was dispensed. This was included in his list of inventions in his book Mechanics and Optics. When the coin was deposited, it fell upon a pan attached to a lever. The lever opened up a valve which let some water flow out. The pan continued to tilt with the weight of the coin until it fell off, at which point a counter-weight would snap the lever back up and turn off the valve.

=== Pappus of Alexandria ===
- Pappus's hexagon theorem
- Pappus's centroid theorem

=== Ptolemy ===
- Ptolemy's world map — It included 8,000 locations from Shetland islands to the Ethiopian plateau and from the Canary Islands to China. Significant contributions of Ptolemy's map is the first use of longitudinal and latitudinal lines as well as specifying terrestrial locations by celestial observations. The Geography was translated from Greek into Arabic in the 9th century and played a role in the work of al-Khwārizmī before lapsing into obscurity. The idea of a global coordinate system revolutionized European geographical thought, however, and inspired more mathematical treatment of cartography.
- Ptolemy was the first to measure the angles of incidence and refraction but failed to understand the relation between them (Snell's Law).
- Ptolemy's intense diatonic scale — Ptolemy's intense diatonic scale is a tuning for the diatonic scale proposed by Ptolemy, declared by Zarlino to be the only tuning that could be reasonably sung, and corresponding with modern just intonation. It is also supported by Giuseppe Tartini.
- Ptolemy's contribution to the science of Trigonometry — are many, among them a theorem that was central to Ptolemy's calculation of chords was what is still known today as Ptolemy's theorem, that the sum of the products of the opposite sides of a cyclic quadrilateral is equal to the product of the diagonals. A special case of Ptolemy's theorem appeared as proposition 93 in Euclid's Data. Ptolemy's theorem leads to the equivalent of the four sum-and-difference formulas for sine and cosine that are today known as Ptolemy's formulas, although Ptolemy himself used chords instead of sine and cosine. Ptolemy further derived the equivalent of the half-angle formula

$$\sin^2\left(\frac{x}{2}\right) = \frac{1 - \cos(x)}{2}$$.

=== Others ===
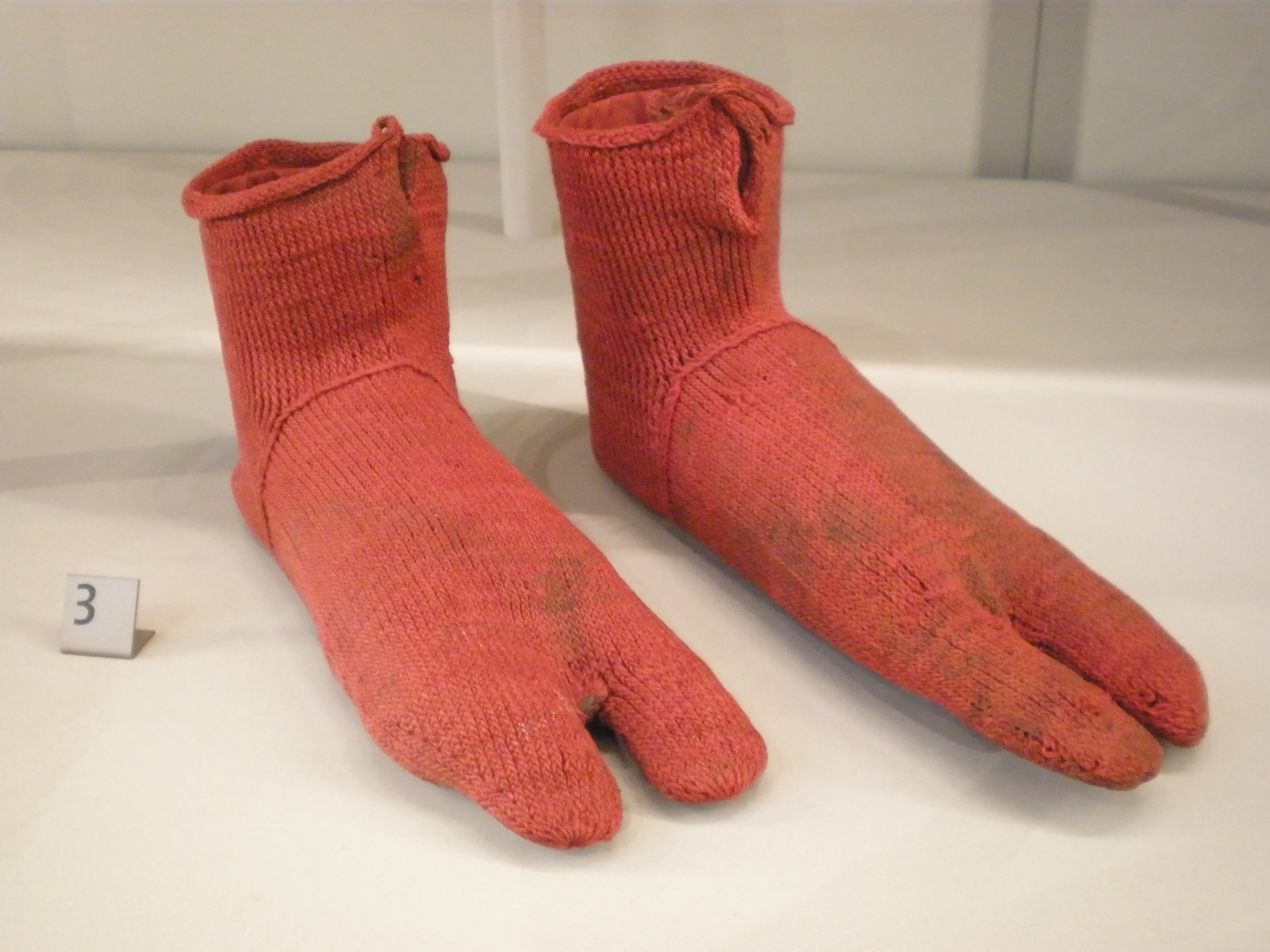
The earliest known surviving pair of socks, created by naalbinding. Dating from 300 to 500, these were excavated from Oxyrhynchus on the Nile in Egypt. The split toes were designed for use with sandals. On display in the Victoria and Albert museum, reference 2085&A-1900.

- Saqiyah — Paddle-driven water-lifting wheels had appeared in ancient Egypt by the 4th century BCE. According to John Peter Oleson, both the compartmented wheel and the hydraulic noria appeared in Egypt by the 4th century BCE, with the sakia being invented there a century later. This is supported by archeological finds at Faiyum, where the oldest archeological evidence of a water wheel has been found, in the form of a sakia dating back to the 3rd century BCE. A papyrus dating to the 2nd century BCE also found in Faiyum mentions a water wheel used for irrigation, a 2nd-century BC fresco found at Alexandria depicts a compartmented sakia, and the writings of Callixenus of Rhodes mention the use of a sakia in the Ptolemaic Kingdom during the reign of Ptolemy IV Philopator in the late 3rd century BCE.
- Fifteen centuries before Braille, wood-carving techniques were in use in the Catechical school of Alexandria by blind scholars to read and write.

=== Religion ===
- Catechesis — The oldest Catechical school in the world is the catechical school of Alexandria.
- Monasticism — Another major contribution made by the Copts in Egypt to Christianity was the creation and organization of monasticism. Worldwide Christian monasticism stems, either directly or indirectly, from the Egyptian example. The most prominent figures of the monastic movement were Anthony the Great, Paul of Thebes, Macarius the Great, Shenouda the Archimandrite and Pachomius the Cenobite. By the end of the 5th century, there were hundreds of monasteries, and thousands of cells and caves scattered throughout the Egyptian desert. Since then pilgrims have visited the Egyptian Desert Fathers to emulate their spiritual, disciplined lives. Saint Basil the Great Archbishop of Caesarea Mazaca, and the founder and organiser of the monastic movement in Asia Minor, visited Egypt around 357 AD and his monastic rules are followed by the Eastern Orthodox Churches. Saint Jerome, who translated the Bible into Latin, came to Egypt while en route to Jerusalem around 400 AD and left details of his experiences in his letters. Saint Benedict founded the Benedictine Order in the 6th century on the model of Saint Pachomius, although in a stricter form.

== Medieval Egypt ==
- Abu Kamil's irrational numbers — An Egyptian scientist who's considered to be the first mathematician to systematically use and accept irrational numbers as solutions and coefficients to equations.
- Astrolabic quadrant was invented in Egypt in the 11th century or 12th century, and later known in Europe as the "Quadrans Vetus" (Old Quadrant).
- Da'irah al-Mu'addal – An astronomical device invented by the Egyptian scientist 'Abd al-'Aziz al-Wafa'i.
- Fountain pen — According to Qadi al-Nu'man al-Tamimi (d. 974) in his Kitab al-Majalis wa 'l-musayarat, the Fatimid caliph Al-Mu'izz li-Din Allah in Egypt demanded a pen that would not stain his hands or clothes, and was provided with a pen that held ink in a reservoir, allowing it to be held upside-down without leaking.
- Packaging and labeling — The earliest recorded use of paper for packaging dates back to 1035, when a Persian traveler visiting markets in Cairo, Egypt, noted that vegetables, spices and hardware were wrapped in paper for the customers after they were sold.
- Sugar refinery — Date back to the 12th century in Medieval Egypt.
- In the late 10th and early 11th centuries AD, the Egyptian astronomer Ibn Yunus performed many careful trigonometric calculations and demonstrated the following trigonometric identity:

$$\cos a \cos b = \frac{\cos(a+b) + \cos(a-b)}{2}$$

== Modern Egypt ==
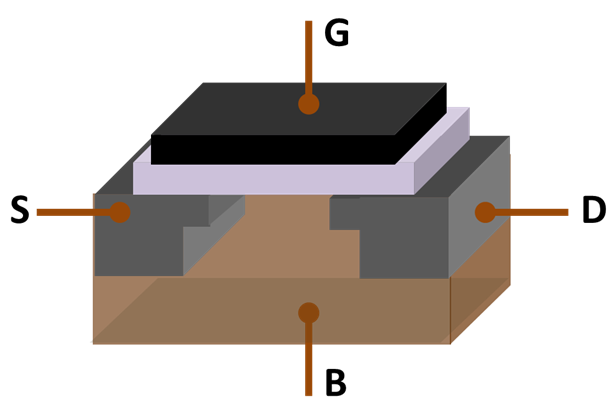
Metal–oxide–semiconductor field-effect transistor (MOSFET)

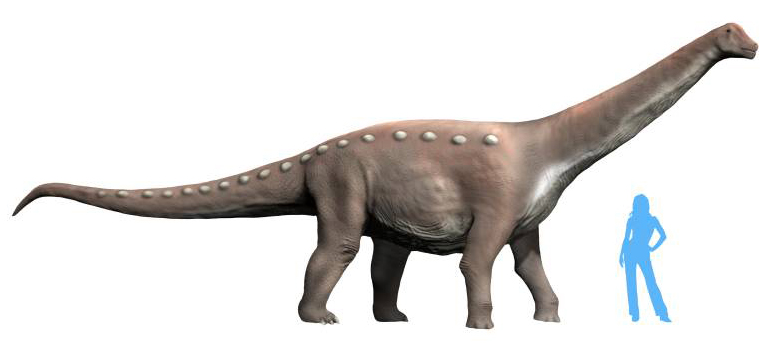
Restoration of Mansourasaurus.

- Cancer treatment with gold – This discovery was made by the Egyptian scientist Mostafa El-Sayed.
- Metal–oxide–semiconductor field-effect transistor (MOSFET) — Invented by Egyptian engineer Mohamed M. Atalla with Dawon Kahng at Bell Labs in 1959 and demonstrated in 1960.
- WiLAN, Wi-Fi, LAN, 3G and 4G — In 1992, Hatim Zaghloul and Michel Fattouche co-founded WiLAN after they developed together the Wideband Orthogonal Frequency Division Multiplexing (WOFDM), and Multi-code Direct-sequence Spread Spectrum (MCDSSS). Through WiLAN's efforts, the Federal Communications Commission (FCC) has allowed OFDM technology over the 2.4 GHz unlicensed ISM band for the Institute of Electrical and Electronics Engineers (IEEE) 802.11 standards. MC-DSSS (MultiCode-Direct-sequence Spread Spectrum) is central to high speed CDMA applications, the main technology currently used by many cellphone networks. The works of Hatim Zaghloul and WiLAN contributed to the invention of Wi-Fi, 3G technology and 4G technology.
- Sameera Moussa — developed an equation that would allow the atoms of cheap metals (e.g. Copper) to be split and radiate nuclear radiations.
- Femtochemistry — Zewail's key work was an explorer of femtochemistry—i.e. the study of chemical reactions across femtoseconds. Using a rapid ultrafast laser technique (consisting of ultrashort laser flashes), the technique allows the description of reactions on very short time scales – short enough to analyse transition states in selected chemical reactions. Zewail became known as the "father of femtochemistry".
- Speed-ball — Speed-Ball is a racquet sport invented in Egypt in 1961 by Mohamed Lotfy (grandfather of Taimour Lotfy) for the training of beginner tennis players. Today it is a sport in its own right, enjoying popularity not only in Egypt but in other countries. Several of these countries make up the International Federation of Speed-Ball (FISB).
- Mansourasaurus — Hesham Sallam, a paleontologist at Mansoura University, together with a team of students discovered a sauropod skeleton in the Dakhla Oasis in Egypt's Western Desert. In 2016, it was reported that over thirty dinosaur specimens had been excavated, among them titanosaurian sauropods.

== See also ==
- List of Egyptian scientists
- List of Egyptian writers
- List of Egyptian architects
- List of Egyptian philosophers
