= Tell Ras Budran =

Archaeological site in Egypt

Tell Ras Budran is an Ancient Egyptian site on which an Ancient fort was built. The site is located in the Sinai peninsula and lies 150 meters away from the shore of Gulf of Suez. It is located not far from the most important as well as one of the oldest known mining areas for copper and turquoise in the Sinai Peninsula. Less than 50 km away are the Wadi Maghareh to the southeast and the temple complex of Serabit el-Khadim to the east.

== History ==
The fort dates back to the Fourth dynasty during the 26th Century B.C. It was contemporary with the Wadi al-Jarf harbor which is on the other side of the Gulf of Suez, thus some suggest that the fort was related to the harbor, since The harbor used to be the headquarters for some mining expeditions in Sinai during the construction of the Great Pyramid.

== Layout ==
The fort is circular in shape. Its inner diameter is about 30 meters with a 5-meter-thick wall on average, making a total of 40 meters as an external diameter. The fort is among the earliest that have battlements and bastions.
