= Pierre Tallet =

French egyptologist (born 1966)

- Occupation: Egyptologist

Pierre Tallet (born 1966) is a French Egyptologist, most famous for discovering the Diary of Merer. He served as president of the French Society of Egyptology from 2009 to 2017. Since 2023 he has been the director of the French Institute of Oriental Archaeology (IFAO) in Cairo.

== Publications ==
Tallet has authored various books and academic papers involving the Great Pyramid of Giza. Below is a full list of his works, some of which he collaborated on with other authors and have been translated from French to English. These publications are according to the National Library of France and the Library of Congress.

- 2003, Egypt: All that we know and how we know it
- 2003, The inscriptions of Ayn Soukhna
- 2003, The Cooking of the Pharaohs
- 2005, Sesostris III and the end of the XII ^{th} Dynasty
- 2006, At the table of the Pharaohs, tastes of yesterday and recipes of today
- 2009, The Red Sea on Pharaonic Times
- 2011, Ayn Soukhna II . The metallurgical workshops of the Middle Kingdom
- 2012, The mining area of South Sinai I
- 2013, 12 queens of Egypt who changed the story
- 2015, The mining area of South Sinai II
- 2015, Between Nile and Seas. Navigation in ancient Egypt
- 2016, Ayn Sukhna III . The shopping gallery complex
- 2017, From Sinai to Sudan. Routes of an Egyptologist
- 2017, The Red Sea Papyrus I. The Diary of Merer
- 2018, The Pharaonic Mining Area of South Sinai III . Egyptian dynastic shipments at the end of the XX ^{th} Dynasty
- 2021, The Red Sea Papyrus II. The Diary of Dedi and other fragments of logbooks
- 2022, The Red Sea Scrolls, How Ancient Papyri Reveal the Secrets of the Pyramids
- 2024 The Red Sea Papyrus III. Accounting documents of the "big deposit".
- 2024, Wadi el-Jarf I. The coastal installations.
- 2026, The Red Sea Papyrus IV

== Discovery of Merer's Diary ==
Tallet and his team discovered the oldest Egyptian papyri known to man in 2013, under a set of caves. Tallet attempted to translate this text into English and he concluded that Merer and his large group had the job of transporting thousands of limestone blocks via ship across the River Nile. This discovery is particularly vital in the modern study of the Great Pyramid, especially as Merer was previously an unknown figure in the study of the Great Pyramid.
