= Wadi al-Jarf =

Area in the Red Sea coast

- وادي الجرف (Arabic)
- Wadi al-Garf, Rod El-Khawaga
- Location within Egypt
- 28°53′30″N 32°39′30″E
- Location: Egypt
- Region: Red Sea Governorate

Site notes
- Archaeologists: J. G. Wilkinson

Wadi al-Jarf (Arabic: وادي الجرف) is an area on the Red Sea coast of Egypt, 119 km (74 mi) south of Suez, that is the site of the oldest known artificial harbour in the world, developed about 4500 years ago. It is located at the mouth of the Wadi Araba, a major communication corridor between the Nile Valley and the Red Sea, crossing the Eastern Desert. The site is across the Gulf of Suez from the small Sinai fortress of Tell Ras Budran. A somewhat similar ancient port is at Ain Sukhna, a little north of Wadi al-Jarf.

The site was first discovered by J. G. Wilkinson in 1832. It was rediscovered by a French team in the 1950s, who named it Rod el-Khawaga. Archeological work was quickly abandoned when the Suez Crisis broke out in 1956. A joint French–Egyptian team resumed excavation in 2011.

The harbor at the site dates to the Fourth Dynasty of Egypt, approximately 4,500 years ago. Also discovered at the site were more than 100 anchors, the first Old Kingdom anchors found in their original context, and numerous storage jars. The jars have been linked with those of another site across the Red Sea, indicating trade between the two sites. A large number of papyrus fragments were found at Wadi al-Jarf, providing insight into life during the Fourth Dynasty. The papyri are the oldest ever found in Egypt.

== Discovery ==
The first known documentation of ancient harbor structures at Wadi al-Jarf was in 1832, when J. G. Wilkinson noted their existence. He discovered a series of galleries cut into the stone which he believed to be Greek catacombs. In the 1950s, a group of French amateurs in archeology began to explore some parts of the site, which they named Rod el-Khawaga, but they were expelled during the 1956 Suez Crisis. Their notes were published in 2008, spurring interest to resume work. Systematic excavation resumed in 2011 by a joint Egyptian–French archeological team led by Pierre Tallet (University Paris IV-La Sorbonne) and Gregory Marouard (The Oriental Institute, Chicago). In April 2013, archaeologists announced the discovery of an ancient harbor and dozens of papyrus documents at the location. Those are the oldest papyri ever found in Egypt (ca. 2560–2550 BC, end of the reign of Khufu).

== Artifacts ==
=== Harbor ===
The harbor complex consists of a ca. 150-metre-long (490 ft) mole or jetty of stones that is still visible at low tide (28.8888°N 32.6815°E), an alamat or navigational landmark made of heaped stones, a 60 m × 30 m (197 ft × 98 ft) building of unknown function that is divided into 13 long rooms, and a series of 25 to 30 storage galleries carved into limestone outcrops further inland. The building of unknown function is the largest pharaonic building discovered to date along the Red Sea coast. The storage galleries are between 16 and 34 m (52 and 112 ft) long, and are usually 3 m (9.8 ft) wide and 2.5 m (8.2 ft) tall.

Inside the galleries lay several boat and sail fragments, some oars, and numerous pieces of ancient rope. Twenty-five stone anchors were found under water, and 99 anchors were found in an apparent storage building. The discovery of anchors in their original context is a first in Old Kingdom archeology. Many of the anchors bear hieroglyphs, likely representing the names of the boats from which they came.

The port was the starting point for voyages from mainland Egypt to South Sinai mining operations. It is speculated that the harbor may have also been used to launch voyages to "the mysterious Land of Punt", a known trading partner of Egypt. The harbor was developed in the reign of the Pharaoh Khufu (2589–2566 B.C.), whose name is inscribed on some of the heavy limestone blocks at the site. That means the harbor predates the second-oldest known port structure by more than 1,000 years. There is some trace evidence of use during the early part of Fifth Dynasty, after which the harbor was likely abandoned.

=== Storage jars and papyri ===
Numerous stone food and water storage jars, textile and wood fragments, and a collection of hundreds of papyrus fragments were also found at the site. Many of the jars feature names of people or boats in red ink, indicating their owners. The jars are characterized by a very particular marl composition which had previously been identified in Fourth Dynasty contexts at other sites, including across the Gulf of Suez at Tell Ras Budran.

Ten of the papyri are especially well preserved. The majority of these documents date to the year after the 13th cattle count of Khufu's reign and describe how the central administration sent food and supplies to Egyptian travelers. One document is of special interest: the Diary of Merer, an official involved in the building of the Great Pyramid of Khufu. Using the diary, researchers reconstructed three months of his life, providing new insight into everyday lives of people of the Fourth Dynasty. The papyri are the oldest ever found in Egypt.

=== Residences ===
Three groups of buildings were found 500 m (1,600 ft) to the northwest of the harbor. The rectangular construction and organization of rooms into a cell-like pattern indicated the buildings served as dwelling places.
