= Nykara =

Ancient Egyptian official

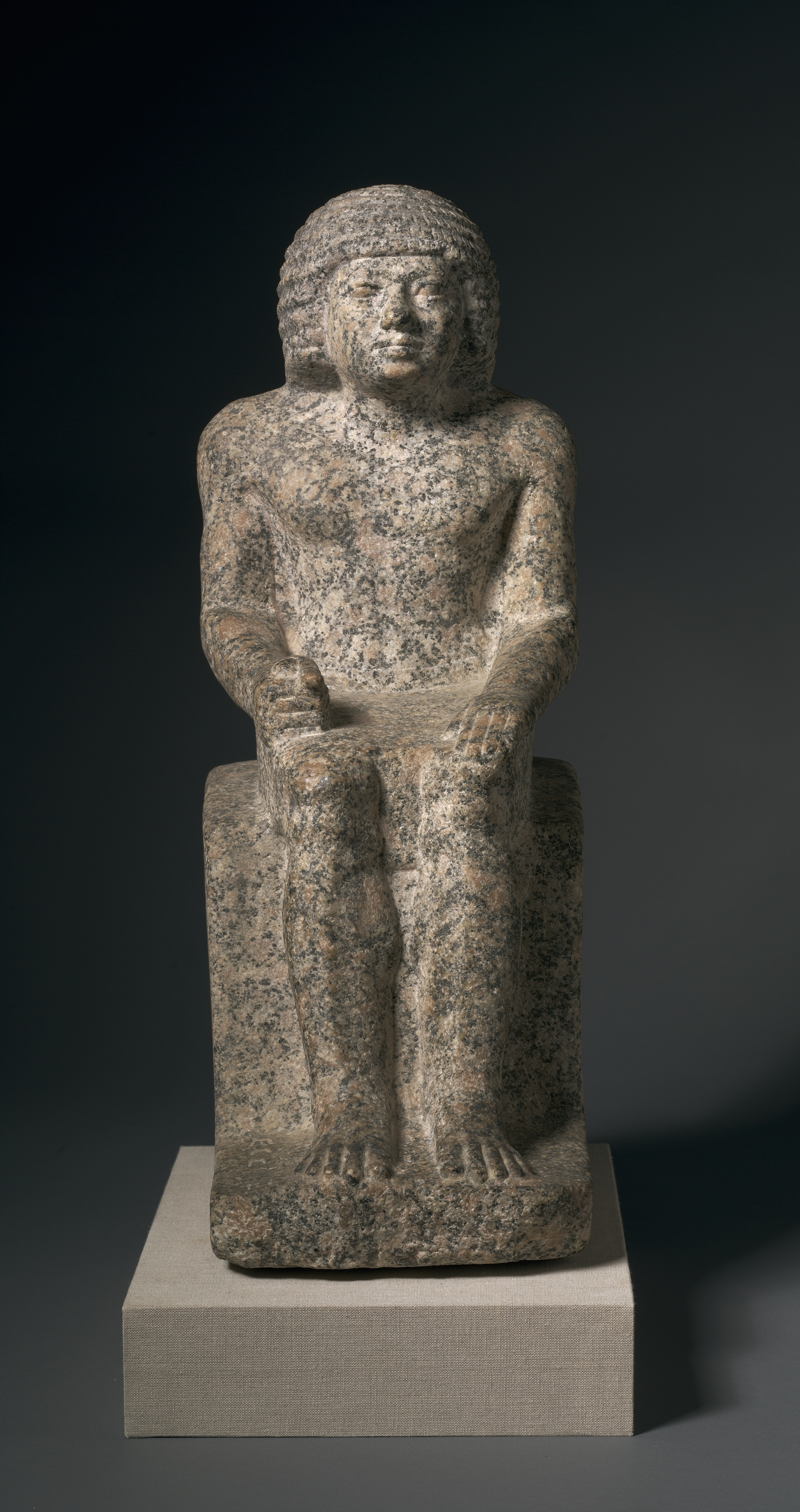
Seated Statue of Nykara, 2408–2377 BC. Red granite and pigment. The Cleveland Museum of Art.

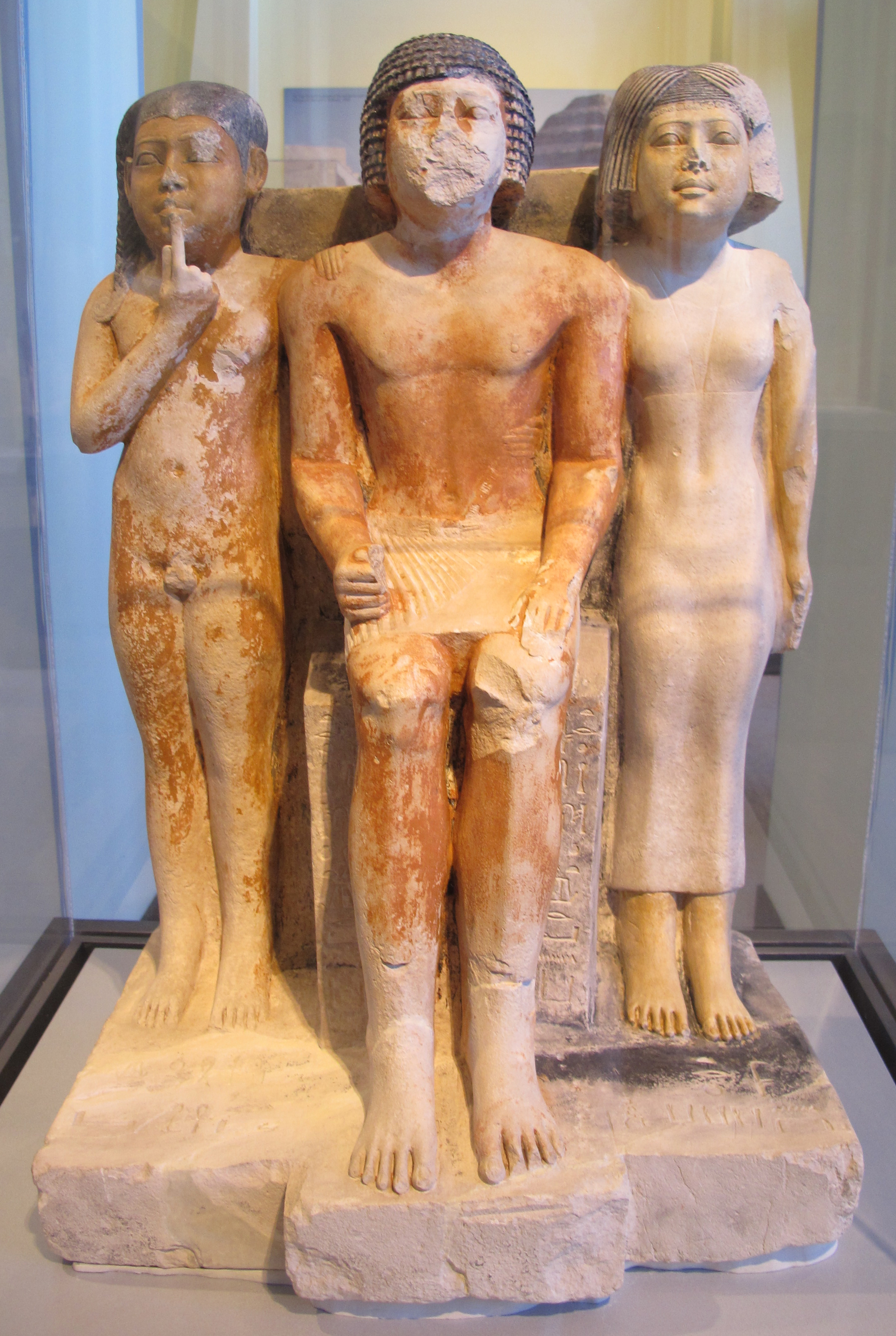
Statue of Nykara and his Family, Brooklyn Museum

Nykara (Ni-ka-re) (fl. c. 2400 BC) was an ancient Egyptian official of the Fifth Dynasty. His highest positions were that of an overseer of the double granaries and overseer of the granary of the residence. He was also priest at the sun-temple of king Niuserre. Nykara is known from a number of monuments all coming from his tomb at Saqqara. Its exact position is unknown.

False Door of Nykara, 2408–2341 BC. Limestone. The Cleveland Museum of Art.

A painted limestone statue of Nykara and his family at the Brooklyn Museum (acc. no. 49.215) features him seated between his wife, Khuen-nub, and young son, Ankh-ma-re, clenching his right fist.

== Bibliography ==
- See "The Old Kingdom and First Intermediate Period," 408 KB pdf-file, Cleveland Museum of Art, pp. 52–53. Note too that footnote 2 (referring to the short rod in his right hand as folded cloth) on page 51 references Henry G. Fischer, "An Elusive Shape within the Fisted Hands of Egyptian Statues" in Ancient Egypt, pp. 143–155, for which no date is provided but most probably refers to: ISBN 0-87099-222-8 and ISBN 0-87099-159-0.
- See also Statue of Nykara and his family and Audio Tours: Statue of Nykara and his family, Brooklyn Museum.
- Strudwick, Nigel (1985). The Administration of Egypt in the Old Kingdom: The Highest Titles and Their Holders (PDF). Studies in Egyptology. London; Boston: Kegan Paul International. ISBN 978-0-7103-0107-9.
