= Diary of Merer =

Egyptian logbook (26th century BC)

- Egyptian Museum, Cairo
- Also known as: Papyrus Jarf, Wadi al-Jarf Papyri, Papyri of Khufu, Cheops Papyri or the Red Sea Scrolls
- Type: Logbook
- Date: c. 2589 – c. 2566 BC
- Place of origin: Wadi al-Jarf
- Language: Ancient Egyptian
- Author: Merer
- Material: Papyrus
- Script: Hieratic
- Discovered: 2013

The Diary of Merer (also known as the Wadi al-Jarf Papyri or Red Sea Scrolls) is the name for papyrus logbooks written over 4,500 years ago by Merer, a middle-ranking official with the title inspector (sḥḏ, sehedj). They are the oldest known papyri with text, dating to the 26th year of the reign of Pharaoh Khufu (reigned in the early 26th century BC, estimated c. 2589 – c. 2566 BC) during the Fourth Dynasty of Egypt. The text, written with cursive hieroglyphs or old hieratic, mostly consists of lists of the daily activities of Merer and his crew. The best preserved sections (Papyrus Jarf A and B) document the transportation of white limestone blocks from the Tura quarries to Giza by boat.

Buried in front of man-made caves that served to store the boats at Wadi al-Jarf on the Red Sea coast, the papyri were found and excavated in 2013 by a French mission under the direction of archaeologists Pierre Tallet of Paris-Sorbonne University and Gregory Marouard. A popular account on the importance of this discovery was published by Pierre Tallet and Mark Lehner, calling the corpus "Red Sea scrolls" (an allusion to the Dead Sea Scrolls).

The Egyptian archaeologist Zahi Hawass describes the Diary of Merer as "the greatest discovery in Egypt in the 21st century." Parts of the papyri are exhibited at the Egyptian Museum in Cairo.

== Contents ==
=== Papyrus Jarf A and B ===
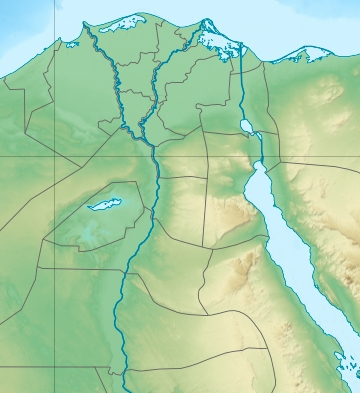
Map of northern Egypt showing the location of the Tura quarries, Giza and the findspot of the Diary of Merer

The most intact papyri describe several months of work with the transportation of limestone from quarries Tura North and Tura South to Giza in the 27th year of the reign of pharaoh Khufu. Though the diary does not specify where the stones were to be used or for what purpose, given the diary may date to what is widely considered the very end of Khufu's reign, Tallet believes they were most likely for cladding the outside of the Great Pyramid. About every ten days, two or three round trips were done, shipping perhaps 30 blocks of 2–3 tonnes each, amounting to 200 blocks per month. About forty boatmen worked under Merer. The period covered in the papyri extends from July to November.

Day 25: Inspector Merer spends the day with his phyle hauling stones in Tura South; spends the night at Tura South
Day 26: Inspector Merer casts off with his phyle from Tura South, loaded with stone, for Akhet-Khufu; spends the night at She-Khufu.
Day 27: sets sail from She-Khufu, sails towards Akhet-Khufu, loaded with stone, spends the night at Akhet-Khufu.
Day 28: casts off from Akhet Khufu in the morning; sails upriver <towards> Tura South

— Log of one of the four-day round-trips from Tura to the Great Pyramid (Akhet-Khufu) and back.

The entries in the logbooks are all arranged along the same line. At the top there is a heading naming the month and the season. Under that there is a horizontal line listing the days of the months. Under the entries for the days, there are always two vertical columns describing what happened on these days (Section B II): [Day 1] The director of 6 Idjeru casts for Heliopolis in a transport boat to bring us food from Heliopolis while the elite is in Tura, Day 2 Inspector Merer spends the day with his troop hauling stones in Tura North; spending the night at Tura North.

The diary also mentions the original name of the Great Pyramid: Akhet-Khufu, meaning "Horizon of Khufu".

In addition to Merer, a few other people are mentioned in the fragments. The most important is Ankhhaf (half-brother of Pharaoh Khufu), known from other sources, who is believed to have been a prince and vizier under Khufu and/or Khafre. In the papyri, he is called a nobleman (Iry-pat) and overseer of Ra-shi-Khufu. The latter place was the harbour at Giza where Tallet believes the casing stones were transported.

=== Papyrus Jarf C ===
Building a "double djadja" in the central Delta

=== Papyrus Jarf D ===
Work for the Residence and the Valley Temple (?) of Khufu

=== Other papyri ===
Other logbooks (E and F) and associated accounts (G to L and other fragments) are much more fragmentary and their contents have yet to be deciphered and/or published.

== See also ==
- Autobiography of Weni

== Bibliography ==
- Tallet, Pierre (2017). Les Papyrus De La Mer Rouge: Le Journal De Merer (Papyrus Jarf A et B) [The Red Sea Papyri: The Diary of Merer] (PDF) (in French, English, and Arabic). Vol. 1. Translated by Clement, Colin; Lotfallah, Soheir. Institut français d'archéologie orientale. ISBN 9782724707069.
- Tallet, Pierre (2021). Les Papyrus De La Mer Rouge: Le Journal De Dedi Et Autres Fragments De Journaux De Bord (Papyrus Jarf C, D, E, F, Aa) [The Red Sea Papyri: The Diary of Dedi and other log fragments] (in French, English, and Arabic). Vol. 2. Translated by Clement, Colin; Lotfallah, Soheir. Institut français d'archéologie orientale. ISBN 978-2724707069.
- Lehner, Mark (2022). Red Sea Scrolls: How Ancient Papyri Reveal the Secrets of the Pyramids. Thames & Hudson. ISBN 9780500777022.
- Tallet, Pierre; Marouard, Gregory (2014). "The Harbor of Khufu on the Red Sea Coast at Wadi al-Jarf, Egypt". Near Eastern Archaeology. 77 (1): 4–14. doi:10.5615/neareastarch.77.1.0004.
