= Star shaft =

Pyramid engineering feature

Elevation diagram of the interior structures of the Great Pyramid.10 shows the King's Chamber and its "star shafts".7 shows the Queen's Chamber and its shafts.

Star shafts, (sometimes called "air shafts") are two narrow ducts leading out of the King's Chamber of the Great Pyramid of Giza, or to similar shafts in the walls of the Queen's Chamber, though these are discussed less frequently due to being blocked off on both the outside and inside of the pyramid.

Shafts of this nature have not been discovered in any other pyramids as of yet. Initially they were presumed to be ventilation shafts, but doubt has been cast on this theory due to not all the shafts leading to the outside. This same fact also undermines the assumption that the shafts were used to observe certain stars. In 2010, researchers from Leeds University developed a robot that traversed the shaft and used an endoscopic camera to look through the hole previously drilled through the stone blocking the path to the outside. This revealed a small chamber with red ochre markings on the floor, followed by another large stone blocking the path.

== Physical characteristics ==
In the north and south walls of the King's Chamber are two narrow shafts, commonly known as "air shafts". They face each other and are located approximately 0.91 m (3.0 ft) above the floor, 2.5 m (8.2 ft) from the eastern wall, with a width of 18 and 21 cm (7 and 8.5 in) and a height of 14 cm (5.5 in). Both start out horizontally for the length of the granite blocks they go through before changing to an upwards direction. The southern shaft ascends at an angle of 45° with a slight curve westwards. One ceiling stone was found to be distinctly unfinished which Gantenbrink called a "Monday morning block". The northern shaft changes angle several times, shifting the path to the west, perhaps to avoid the Big Void. The builders had trouble calculating the right angles, resulting in parts of the shaft being narrower. Nowadays they both commute to the exterior; whether they originally penetrated the outer casing is unknown.

== Theories of purpose ==
In the Great Pyramid of Giza there are two narrow shafts, in the north and south walls of the King's Chamber. Alexandre M. Badawy suggested that the south shaft pointed to Orion's Belt during the period of the construction of the Giza pyramid complex. While this may be true, the shafts could not have been used to actually observe the stars due to the intentionally placed stones blocking the path. Virginia Trimble posited that the north shaft was meant to point towards the north circumpolar stars, The Indestructibles. The Ancient Egyptians believed that these stars were closely associated with eternity and the afterlife, so this northern shaft possibly could have been a way whereby the soul of the deceased king might ascend to the stars.

Another common theory is that the shafts were merely "air vents" for ventilation. It's evident that they can be used as such, given that they were cleaned in modern times, to allow for better ventilation for tourists. Of course the dead do not need air vents, but they may have been useful as such during the construction of the pyramid or in rituals following the death of a pharaoh. However, the Queen's Chamber shafts were found sealed, so whether or not they could have been used for ventilation is uncertain. Furthermore, the lack of shafts in the other pyramids casts doubt on this theory.

The theory that is most widely accepted today is that of the shafts pointing towards certain stars/asterisms that were important to the Egyptians. It is expected that at the time of the pyramid's construction (circa 2500 BC), the shafts aligned with the transit points of Alpha Draconis (which is projected to have been the star closest to the north celestial pole), Orion's Belt, Sirius, and Beta Ursae Minoris. The star shafts were presumably meant to direct the spirit of the pharaoh to these stars; Alpha Draconis the pole star, Beta Ursa Minoris one of The Indestructibles, Orion representing the deity Osiris, and Sirius representing his consort Isis.

== Robotic exploration ==
In 2010, researchers from Leeds University had finished construction of a robot specifically designed to traverse the shafts and attempt to determine their true purpose. The robot successfully navigated through all 60 meters of one shaft, collecting nine hours of video footage. Upon reaching the large stone at the end of the shaft, the robot managed to get a camera past it. On the other side, a small chamber with intricate symbols on the floor was discovered. Rob Richardson, Professor of Robotics at Leeds, stated “given the artwork, it is likely the shaft served a bigger purpose than act as an air vent. But what that bigger purpose was remains a mystery.”

Furthermore, at the other end of the small decorated chamber, was another large stone blocking the shaft; due to the robot not being able to get past the second stone, what lies past it continues to remain a mystery. However, the robotic exploration project had to be cut short due to growing security problems in Egypt.
