= Djedi Project =

Great Pyramid of Giza archaeological project

The Djedi Project was an international archaeological robotics exploration of the inaccessible interior shafts in the Great Pyramid of Giza, particularly those in the Queen's Chamber. The name derived from Djedi, the ancient Egyptian magician consulted by Pharaoh Khufu when planning his famous pyramid.

The team was managed by University of Leeds and supported by Dassault Systèmes in France with research lead Professor Rob Richardson. Its central objective was to deploy a minimally invasive robotic system capable of navigating the shafts, in order to gather evidence about their function. Development of the robotic system took several years, with the 20cm width of the shafts posing as the main technical challenge.

== Team members ==
The team included:

- Ng Tze Chuen (Hong Kong), independent researcher
- Shaun Whitehead (UK), independent researcher, Scoutek
- Robert Richardson (UK), Professor of Robotics, School of Mechanical Engineering, University of Leeds, UK
- Ron Grieve (Canada), from Tekron Services, Canada
- Other key team members are Andrew Pickering, Stephen Rhodes, Adrian Hildred, Jason Liu, William Mayfield and Andrew Smyth.

The team made preliminary studies of the airshafts in July and December 2009, and continued its work in 2011.

== Equipment ==
Details of the Djedi Team Robot:

- "Pinhole camera" that can fit through small spaces and see around corners like an endoscope
- A miniaturised ultrasonic device that can tap on walls and listen to the response to help determine the thickness and condition of the stone
- A miniature "beetle" robot that can fit through a hole of 20mm diameter for further exploration in confined spaces
- Precision compass and inclinometer to measure the orientation of the shafts
- A core drill that can penetrate the second blocking stone (if necessary and feasible) while removing the minimum amount of material necessary

== Results ==
The Djedi robot successfully ascended the southern shaft of the Queen’s Chamber, and deployed its camera systems beyond the previously unreachable barriers.

Small red markings were found inside the second-door small shaft space. The back of the door was filmed which showed the rest of two ornate metal handles. Construction marks were also found on the floor and walls of a small hidden chamber.

Development of the project and photographic findings were published in the 2013 Journal of Field Robotics.

== See also ==
- The Upuaut Project
