= The Indestructibles =

Pair of stars in Ursa Minor and Ursa Major

The Indestructibles (Ancient Egyptian: j.ḫmw-sk – literally "the ones not knowing destruction") was the name given by ancient Egyptian astronomers to two bright stars which, at that time, could always be seen circling the North Pole. The name is directly related to Egyptian belief in constant North as a portal to heaven for pharaohs, and the stars' close association with eternity and the afterlife. These circumpolar stars are now known as Kochab (Beta Ursae Minoris), in the bowl of Ursa Minor or, the Little Dipper, and Mizar (Zeta Ursae Majoris), in Ursa Major, at the middle of the handle of the Big Dipper.

== Terminology ==
Egyptologist Toby Wilkinson explained the naming as apt metaphor in Egyptian ideology. "Circumpolar stars are a very good metaphor for the afterlife because when viewed, they never seem to set: they simply rotate around the pole star. They are the undying stars, or in Egyptian terminology, the Indestructibles, a perfect destination for the soul of the dead king," he said in 2001.

The context for this is the Egyptian belief that Ra (the sun god) was given birth to by Nut (the sky goddess). Nut was pictured as a naked female spread across the sky, and identified with the Milky Way – the legs formed by the bifurcation at Deneb in Cygnus, and the head by the swelling at Gemini. The head of Nut passes below the horizon about 75 minutes after the sun on the spring equinox, and at the same point on the horizon, "consuming" Ra, who was symbolically reborn 272 days later on the morning of the Winter solstice, on the same declination as Deneb.

== Astronomy ==
About 4,500 years ago, the Egyptians believed that the immovable area the stars encircled by 10 degrees each, was heaven in the sense that it was the place of the afterlife. The pole star at the time was Thuban (Alpha Draconis).

== Cosmogony ==
Egyptians associated those two stars with eternity and the afterlife of a king or pharaoh so that after death, a pharaoh would hope to join those stars. During the Old Kingdom it was thought that only the pharaoh and his family could ascend to heaven.

As Pharaohs were buried in pyramids there were implications for their afterlife and their immortality and consequently the structures were deliberately aligned astronomically. Believing that their kings became stars in the Northern sky after death, Egyptians aligned their pyramids and temples due north toward the "indestructible" stars, giving the departed pharaohs direct access to the northern sky.

== Pyramid design ==
Schematic cross-section of the Great Pyramid: 1. Original entrance; 2. Robber's tunnel; 3. Granite blocks; 4. Descending Passage; 5. Lower Chamber; 6. Ascending Passage; 7. Queen's Chamber and shafts/vents; 8. Horizontal Passage and shafts/vents; 9. Grand Gallery; 10. King's Chamber; 11. Anteroom; 12. Greave's Shaft

The entrances to all the Fourth Dynasty pyramids at Giza (the Great Pyramid, the Pyramid of Khafre, and the Pyramid of Menkaure) are in their north faces and the corridors are sloped down from the entrances in such a way that both the circumpolar stars and the pole star were visible. The positioning of the pyramids is such that they do not block each other's views of these stars.

A pyramid was a resting place, rather than a tomb, providing the occupant with all the requirements both physical and mystical for the journey of the ka to the afterlife to become an akh. Because of this, as David Warburton puts it, "In this sense... the entrance is in fact the exit".

The North Shaft of the Kings chamber is also believed to have aligned with Beta Ursae Minoris to facilitate the King's journey as Horus to the stars.

Dr. Kate Spence of the Faculty of Oriental Studies at Cambridge University argues that the alignment of the Great Pyramid of Giza was performed by waiting for a "simultaneous transit" of the circumpolar Indestructibles, and therefore, that by charting the precession of the stars a relatively accurate start date (+/- 5 years) for its construction can be given, namely 2480 BC. Previous Egyptian chronology for the Old Kingdom could only be considered accurate to within 100 years either way.

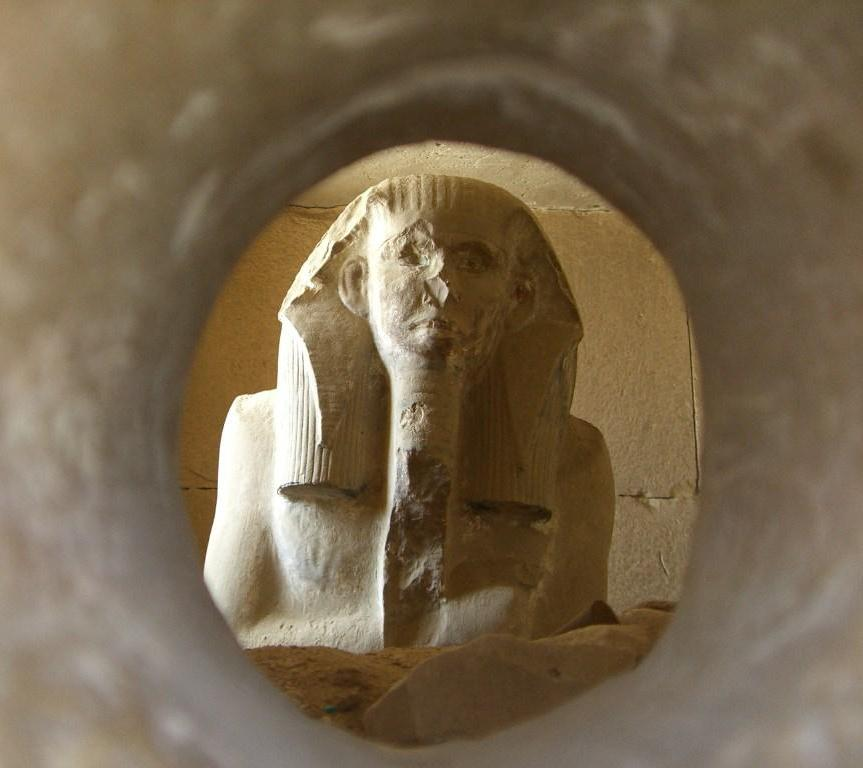
Djoser's ka statue in its serdab

The ka statue of Djoser in his tomb at Saqqara was in a serdab (a type of chamber) in the north-eastern base of his pyramid, tilted at 17 degrees to enable it to observe the circumpolar stars through two holes.
