= Upuaut Project =

Exploration of the Great Pyramid

The Upuaut Project was a scientific exploration of the so-called "air shafts" of the Great Pyramid of Giza, which was built as a tomb for Fourth Dynasty pharaoh Khufu. The Upuaut Project was led by Rudolf Gantenbrink under the auspices of the German Archaeological Institute in Cairo during three campaigns (two in 1992 and one in 1993). According to Bauval, it was "marshalled into two stages: the first stage, to improve ventilation in the Great Pyramid using the shafts in the King's Chamber, and the second stage to explore the presumed 'abandoned' shafts in the Queen's Chambers." The latter was accomplished by sending a miniature mobile robot designed by Rudolph Gantenbrink, named Upuaut-2, into the shafts.

The keynote context and findings of the project became a television documentary.

The project resulted in the finding of a "sealed block", a sort of door or barrier with two metal loops at the end of the southern air shaft of the Queen's Chamber. Gantenbrink attempted a survey of the northern shaft a few days later, but the attempt was abandoned as he was afraid the robot might get stuck. "The temptation is great to send Upuaut around the sharp bend at 18 meters," he wrote. "But, since our short guide rods have suddenly turned up missing, the danger is too great that the robot might get stuck and not be able to return."

Many questions exist regarding what the door implies. Two theories forwarded at that time include an "Abandonment Theory" which states that the Queen's Chamber was abandoned in favor of a second location known as the King's Chamber, which is higher up in the pyramid. This theory is based upon the fact that the northern and southern shafts of the Queen's Chamber do not continue to the outer surface of the pyramid as the northern and southern shafts in the King's Chamber do. The second theory, posited by Bauval, is that the Queen's Chamber wasn't abandoned, but may have been used for rituals. Bauval indicates that the southern shaft door from the Queen's Chamber is located roughly 70.5' (21.5m) above the floor level of the King's Chamber. He reasons that if the Queen's Chamber was abandoned, builders would have terminated that shaft much lower in the pyramid, (i.e., below the King's Chamber.) He notes that when following the angles of the King's Chamber and Queen's Chamber shafts into the sky, they point to astronomical targets and may have religious significance. The southern shaft in the King's Chamber points to the god Sahu-Osiris (central star of Orion's Belt) and the northern shaft points to Alpha Draconis. The Queen's Chamber southern shaft, if extended, points to the goddess Sothus-Isis (Sirius) and its northern shaft, if extended, would point to Draconis' center. Alpha Draconis might have "a cultic significance with Rer or Tuart, the Hippopotamus-goddess who was the protectress of divine pregnancy and birth." Since that time, other researchers have put forth their own theories and explanations.

Research of the Queen's Chamber shafts continued with the National Geographic Pyramid Rover and with the Djedi Project managed by an international academic team.

== See also ==
- Djedi Project
