= Great Pyramid of Giza =

Largest pyramid in the Giza Necropolis, Egypt

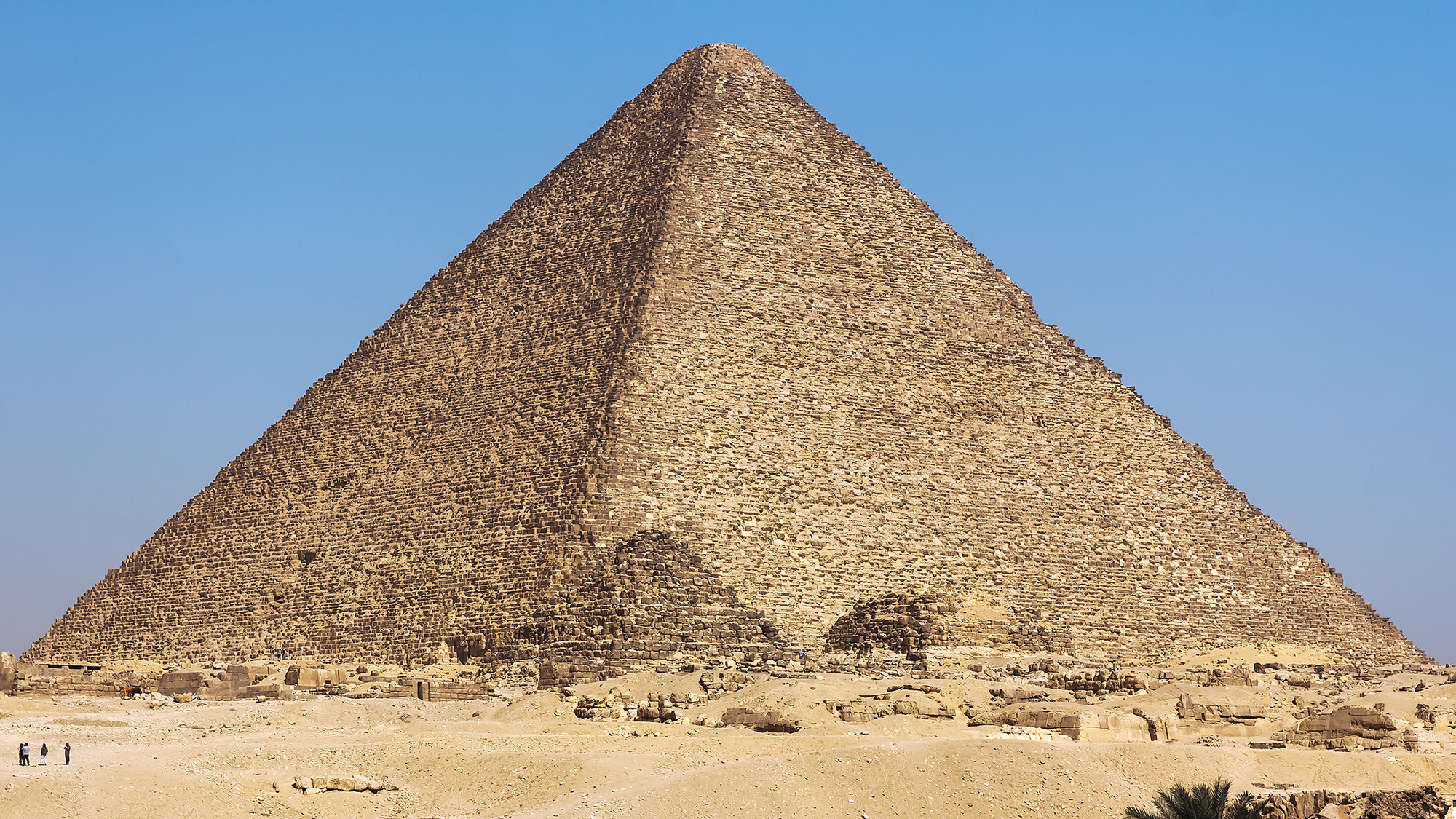
- The Great Pyramid, seen in 2023

- Location within Egypt Location within Africa
- 29°58′45″N 31°08′03″E
- Location: Giza, Egypt
- Ancient name: Akhet Khufu; Khufu's Horizon
- Architect: Hemiunu (presumed)
- Constructed: c. 2600 BC (Old Kingdom); 4626 years ago
- Type: True pyramid
- Material: Limestone, mortar, granite
- Height: Original: 146.6 m (481 ft) or 280 cubits Current: 138.5 m (454 ft)
- Base: 230.33 m (756 ft) or 440 cubits
- Volume: 2.6 million m^{3} (92 million ft^{3})
- Slope: 51°50'40" or seked of 5 1/2 palms

UNESCO World Heritage Site
- Part of: Memphis and its Necropolis – the Pyramid Fields from Giza to Dahshur
- Criteria: Cultural: i, iii, vi
- Reference: 86-002
- Inscription: 1979 (3rd Session)
- Area: Egypt
- Building details

Record height
- Tallest in the world from c. 2600 BC to 1221 AD^{[I]}
- Preceded by: Red Pyramid (Egypt)
- Surpassed by: Old St Paul's Cathedral (England)

The Great Pyramid of Giza (Note: Also known as the Pyramid of Khufu or the Pyramid of Cheops (Egyptian Arabic: هرم خوفو, romanized: Haram Khūfū)) is the largest of the Egyptian pyramids and the most famous landmark of the Giza pyramid complex in Giza, Egypt. It is the oldest of the Seven Wonders of the Ancient World, and the only wonder that has remained largely intact. The Great Pyramid served as the tomb of Egyptian Pharaoh Khufu ("Cheops"), who ruled during the Fourth Dynasty of the Old Kingdom. It was built c. 2600 BC over a period of about 26 years.

Initially standing at 146.6 metres (481 feet), the Great Pyramid was the world's tallest human-made structure for more than 3,700 years. Over time, most of the smooth white limestone casing was removed, which lowered the pyramid's height to the current 138.5 metres (454.4 ft); what is seen today is the underlying core structure. Each side of the base was measured to be about 230.3 metres (755.6 ft) in length, giving a volume of roughly 2.6 million cubic metres (92 million cubic feet), which includes an internal hillock. The dimensions of the pyramid were 280 royal cubits (146.7 m; 481.4 ft) high, a base length of 440 cubits (230.6 m; 756.4 ft), with a seked of 5 1/2 palms (a slope of 51°50'40").

The Great Pyramid was built by quarrying an estimated 2.3 million large blocks, weighing 6 million tonnes in total. The majority of the stones are not uniform in size or shape, and are only roughly dressed. The outside layers were bound together by mortar, primarily local limestone from the Giza Plateau was used for its construction. Other blocks were imported by boat on the Nile: white limestone from Tura for the casing, and blocks of granite from Aswan, weighing up to 80 tonnes, for the "King's Chamber" structure.

There are three known chambers inside of the Great Pyramid. The lowest was cut into the bedrock, upon which the pyramid was built, but remained unfinished. The so-called Queen's Chamber and King's Chamber, which contain a granite sarcophagus, are above ground within the pyramid structure. Hemiunu, Khufu's vizier, is believed by some to be the architect of the Great Pyramid. Many varying scientific and alternative hypotheses attempt to explain the exact construction techniques, but, as is the case for other such structures, there is no definite consensus.

The funerary complex around the pyramid consisted of two mortuary temples connected by a causeway (one close to the pyramid and one near the Nile); tombs for the immediate family and court of Khufu, including three smaller pyramids for Khufu's wives; an even smaller "satellite pyramid"; and five buried solar barques. It is part of the UNESCO World Heritage Site "Memphis and its Necropolis".

== Purpose ==
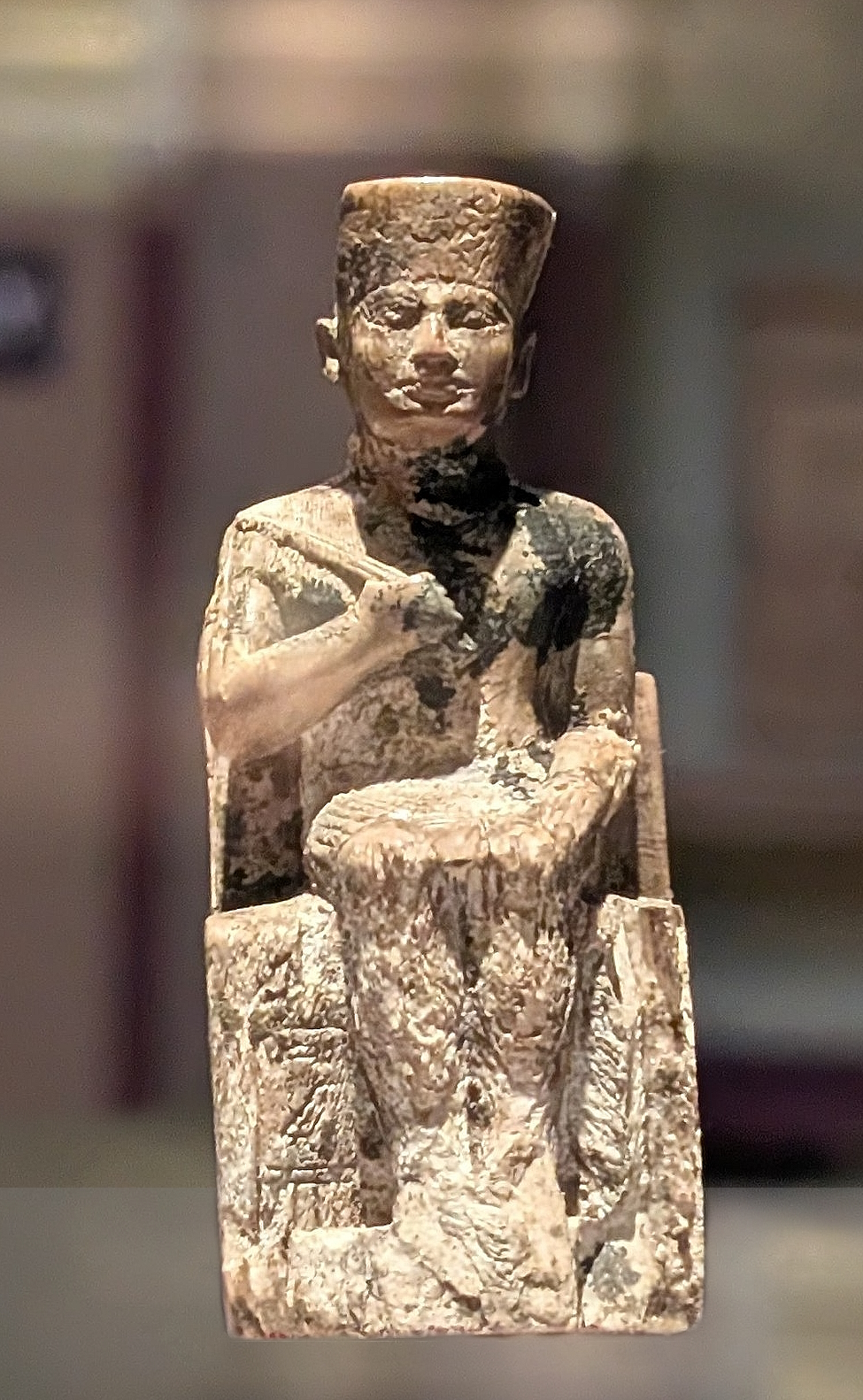
Statue of pharaoh Khufu/Cheops, Cairo Museum.

The Great Pyramid of Giza was the tomb of pharaoh Khufu, and still contains his granite sarcophagus. It had, like other tombs of Egyptian elites, four main purposes:

- It housed the body of the deceased and kept it safe.
- It demonstrated the status of the deceased and his family.
- It retained the deceased's place in society.
- It was a place where offerings could be brought to the deceased.

Make your grave well furnished and prepare thy place in the west.
Look, death counts little for us. Look, life is valued highly by us.
The house of the dead (the tomb) is for life.

— Excerpt from the Instruction of Hardjedef (son of Khufu)

In ancient Egypt, high social status was considered absolutely positive, and the monumental social inequalities were symbolized by gigantic pyramids versus smaller mastabas. The sizes of tombs were regulated officially, with their allowed dimensions written down in royal decrees. In the Old Kingdom only kings and queens could have a pyramid tomb. Architectural layout and funeral equipment were also sanctioned, and were, like access to material and workers, at the discretion of the king.

The Great Pyramid's internal chambers lack inscriptions and decorations, the norm for Egyptian tombs of the fourth to late fifth dynasty, apart from work-gang graffiti that include Khufu's names. Constructed around 2600 BC, it predates the custom of inscribing pyramids with text by over 200 years.

The pyramid complex of Khufu included two temples that were lavishly decorated and inscribed. The pyramid temple was dedicated to the Sed festival, celebrating Khufu's 30th jubilee. Surviving scenes portray Khufu, officials, priests and other characters performing rituals. The valley temple remains largely unexcavated, but blocks reused by Amenemhat I depict, for instance, nautical scenes and personifications of the estates of Khufu (e.g. the estate "Khufu is beautiful"). The mortuary cult of Khufu which operated in these temples for hundreds of years indicates that Khufu was successfully interred in the Great Pyramid. That the funeral was carried out by Khufu's son and successor Djedefre is evidenced by the presence of his cartouches on the blocks that sealed the boat pits next to the pyramid.

The Great Pyramid was likely looted as early as the First Intermediate Period and may have been reused afterwards. Arab accounts tell stories of mummies and treasures being found inside the pyramid. For instance, Al-Maqrizi (1364–1442) reports the discovery of three shrouded bodies, a sarcophagus filled with gold, and a corpse in golden armour with a sword of inestimable value and a ruby as large as an egg.

== Attribution to Khufu ==
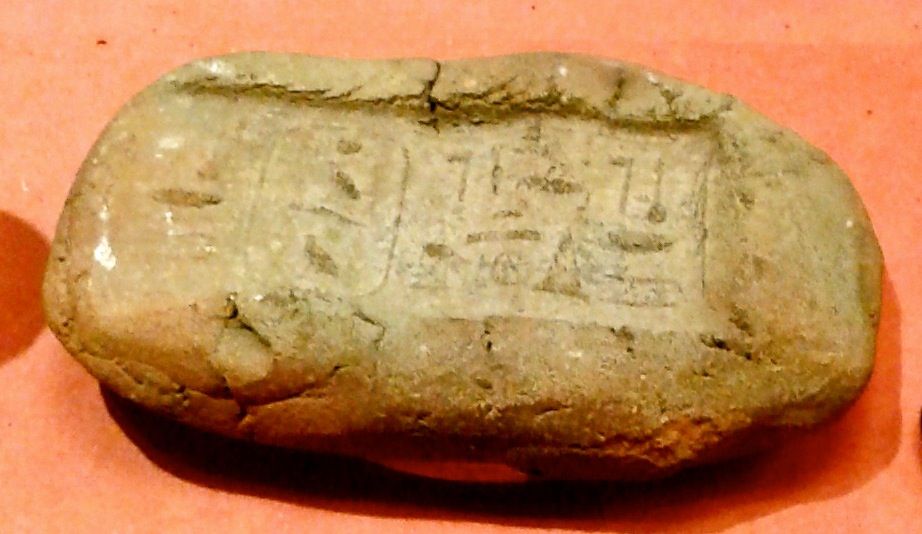
Clay seal bearing the name of the Great Pyramid which includes Khufu's cartouche, c. 664 BC – c. 332 BC, Louvre museum

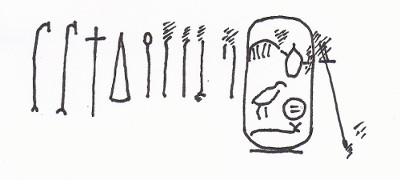
Khufu's cartouche found inscribed on a backing stone of the pyramid

Historically the Great Pyramid had been attributed to Khufu based on the words of authors of classical antiquity, first and foremost Herodotus and Diodorus Siculus. During the Middle Ages other people were credited with the construction of the pyramid as well, for example Joseph from the Book of Genesis, Nimrod, or the legendary king Saurid ibn Salhouk.

In 1837 four additional relieving chambers were found above the King's Chamber after tunnelling to them. The chambers, previously inaccessible, were covered in hieroglyphs of red paint. The workers who were building the pyramid had marked the blocks with the names of their gangs, which included the pharaoh's name (e.g.: "The gang, The white crown of Khnum-Khufu is powerful"). The names of Khufu were spelled out on the walls over a dozen times. Another of these graffiti was found by Goyon on an exterior block of the 4th layer of the pyramid. The inscriptions are comparable to those found at other sites of Khufu, such as the alabaster quarry at Hatnub or the harbour at Wadi al-Jarf, and are present in pyramids of other pharaohs as well.

Throughout the 20th century the cemeteries next to the pyramid were excavated. Family members and high officials of Khufu were buried in the East Field south of the causeway, and the West Field, including the wives, children and grandchildren of Khufu, Hemiunu, Ankhaf and (the funerary cache of) Hetepheres I, mother of Khufu. As Hassan puts it: "From the early dynastic times, it was always the custom for the relatives, friends and courtiers to be buried in the vicinity of the king they had served during life. This was quite in accordance with the Egyptian idea of the Hereafter."

The cemeteries were actively expanded until the 6th dynasty and used less frequently afterwards. The earliest pharaonic name of seal impressions is that of Khufu, the latest of Pepi II. Worker graffiti were written on some of the stones of the tombs as well; for instance, "Mddw" (Medjedu, the Horus name of Khufu) on the mastaba of Chufunacht, probably a grandson of Khufu.

Some inscriptions in the chapels of the mastabas (like the pyramid, their burial chambers were usually bare of inscriptions) mention Khufu or his pyramid. For instance, an inscription of Mersyankh III states that "Her mother [is the] daughter of the King of Upper and Lower Egypt Khufu." Most often these references are part of a title, for example, Snnw-ka, "Chief of the Settlement and Overseer of the Pyramid City of Akhet-Khufu" or Nykahap, "priest of Khufu who presides over the pyramid Akhet-Khufu". Several tomb owners have a king's name as part of their own name (e.g. Chufudjedef, Chufuseneb, Merichufu). The earliest pharaoh alluded to in that manner at Giza is Snefru (Khufu's father).

In 1936 Hassan uncovered a stela of Amenhotep II near the Great Sphinx of Giza, which implies the two larger pyramids were still attributed to Khufu and Khafre in the New Kingdom. It reads: "He yoked the horses in Memphis, when he was still young, and stopped at the Sanctuary of Hor-em-akhet (the Sphinx). He spent a time there in going round it, looking at the beauty of the Sanctuary of Khufu and Khafra the revered."

In 1954 two boat pits, one containing the Khufu ship, were discovered buried at the south foot of the pyramid. The cartouche of Djedefre was found on many of the blocks that covered the boat pits. As the successor and eldest son he would have presumably been responsible for the burial of Khufu. The second boat pit was examined in 1987; excavation work started in 2010. Graffiti on the stones included 4 instances of the name "Khufu", 11 instances of "Djedefre", a year (in reign, season, month and day), measurements of the stone, various signs and marks, and a reference line used in construction, all done in red or black ink.

During excavations in 2013 the Diary of Merer was found at Wadi al-Jarf. It documents the transportation of white limestone blocks from Tura to the Great Pyramid, which is mentioned by its original name Akhet Khufu (with a pyramid determinative) dozens of times. It details that the stones were accepted at She Akhet-Khufu ("the pool of the pyramid Horizon of Khufu") and Ro-She Khufu ("the entrance to the pool of Khufu"), which were under supervision of Ankhhaf, the half brother and vizier of Khufu, and the owner of the largest mastaba of the Giza East Field.

== Age ==
Modern estimates of dating the Great Pyramid and Khufu's first regnal year
Author (year)	Estimated date
Greaves (1646)	1266 BC
Gardiner (1835)	2123 BC
Lepsius (1849)	3124 BC
Bunsen (1860)	3209 BC
Mariette (1867)	4235 BC
Breasted (1906)	2900 BC
Hassan (1960)	2700 BC
O'Mara (1997)	2700 BC
Beckarath (1997)	2554 BC
Arnold (1999)	2551 BC
Spence (2000)	2480 BC
Shaw (2000)	2589 BC
Hornung (2006)	2509 BC
Ramsey et al. (2010)	2613–2577 BC

The Great Pyramid has been determined to be about 4,600 years old by two principal approaches: indirectly, through its attribution to Khufu and his chronological age, based on archaeological and textual evidence; and directly, via radiocarbon dating of organic material found in the pyramid and included in its mortar.

=== Historical chronology ===
In the past the Great Pyramid was dated by its attribution to Khufu alone, putting the construction of the Great Pyramid within his reign, hence dating the pyramid was a matter of dating Khufu and the 4th dynasty. The relative sequence and synchrony of events is the focal point of this method.

Absolute calendar dates are derived from an interlocked network of evidence, the backbone of which are the lines of succession known from ancient king lists and other texts. The reign lengths from Khufu to known points in the earlier past are summated, bolstered with genealogical data, astronomical observations, and other sources. As such, the historical chronology of Egypt is primarily a political chronology, thus independent from other types of archaeological evidence like stratigraphies, material culture, or radiocarbon dating.

The majority of recent chronological estimates date Khufu and his pyramid between 2700 and 2500 BC.

=== Radiocarbon dating ===
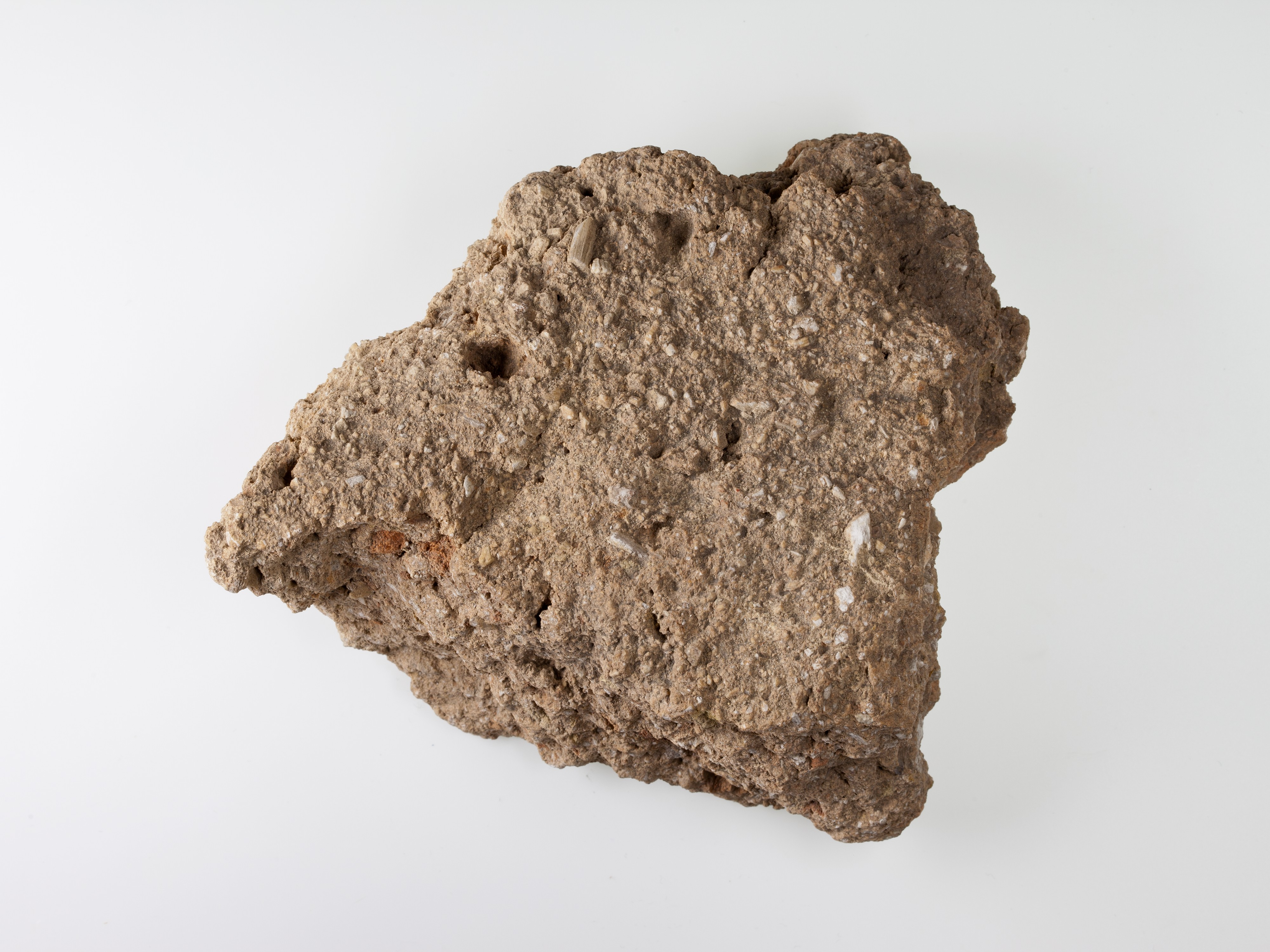
Specimen of mortar from between core blocks of the Great Pyramid

Mortar was used generously in the Great Pyramid's construction. In the mixing process ashes from fires were added to the mortar, organic material that could be extracted and radiocarbon dated. A total of 46 samples of the mortar were taken in 1984 and 1995, making sure they were clearly inherent to the original structure and could not have been incorporated at a later date. The results were calibrated to 2871–2604 BC. The old wood problem is thought to be mainly responsible for the 100–300 year offset, since the age of the organic material was determined, not when it was last used. A reanalysis of the data gave a completion date for the pyramid between 2620 and 2484 BC, based on the younger samples.

In 1872 Waynman Dixon opened the lower pair of "Air-Shafts", previously closed at both ends, by chiseling holes into the walls of the Queen's Chamber. One of the objects found within was a cedar plank, which came into possession of James Grant, a friend of Dixon. After inheritance it was donated to the Museum of Aberdeen in 1946; however, it had broken into pieces and was filed incorrectly. Lost in the vast museum collection, it was only rediscovered in 2020, when it was radiocarbon dated to 3341–3094 BC, over 500 years older than Khufu's chronological age. Abeer Eladany suggests that the wood originated from the centre of a long-lived tree or had been recycled for many years prior to being deposited in the pyramid.

=== History of dating Khufu and the Great Pyramid ===
Circa 450 BC Herodotus attributed the Great Pyramid to Cheops (Hellenization of Khufu), yet erroneously placed his reign following the Ramesside period. Manetho, around 200 years later, composed an extensive list of Egyptian kings, which he divided into dynasties, assigning Khufu to the 4th. However, after phonetic changes in the Egyptian language and consequently the Greek translation, "Cheops" had transformed into "Souphis" (and similar versions).

Greaves, in 1646, reported the great difficulty of ascertaining a date for the pyramid's construction based on the lacking and conflicting historic sources. Because of the differences in spelling, he did not recognize Khufu on Manetho's king list (as transcribed by Africanus and Eusebius), hence he relied on Herodotus' incorrect account. Summating the duration of lines of succession, Greaves concluded 1266 BC to be the beginning of Khufu's reign.

Two centuries later, some of the gaps and uncertainties in Manetho's chronology had been cleared by discoveries such as the King Lists of Turin, Abydos, and Karnak. The names of Khufu found within the Great Pyramid's relieving chambers in 1837 helped to make clear that Cheops and Souphis are one and the same. Thus the Great Pyramid was recognized to have been built in the 4th dynasty. The dating among Egyptologists still varied by multiple centuries (around 4000–2000 BC), depending on methodology, preconceived religious notions (such as the biblical deluge) and which source they thought was more credible.

Estimates significantly narrowed in the 20th century, most being within 250 years of each other, around the middle of the third millennium BC. The newly developed radiocarbon dating method confirmed that the historic chronology was approximately correct. It is still not a perfectly accurate method due to larger margins of error, calibration uncertainties and the problem of inbuilt age (time between growth and final usage) in plant material, including wood. Astronomical alignments have also been suggested to coincide with the time of construction.

Egyptian chronology continues to be refined and data from multiple disciplines have started to be factored in, such as luminescence dating, radiocarbon dating, and dendrochronology. For instance, Ramsey et al. included over 200 radiocarbon samples in their model.

== Historiographical record ==
=== Classical antiquity ===
==== Herodotus ====
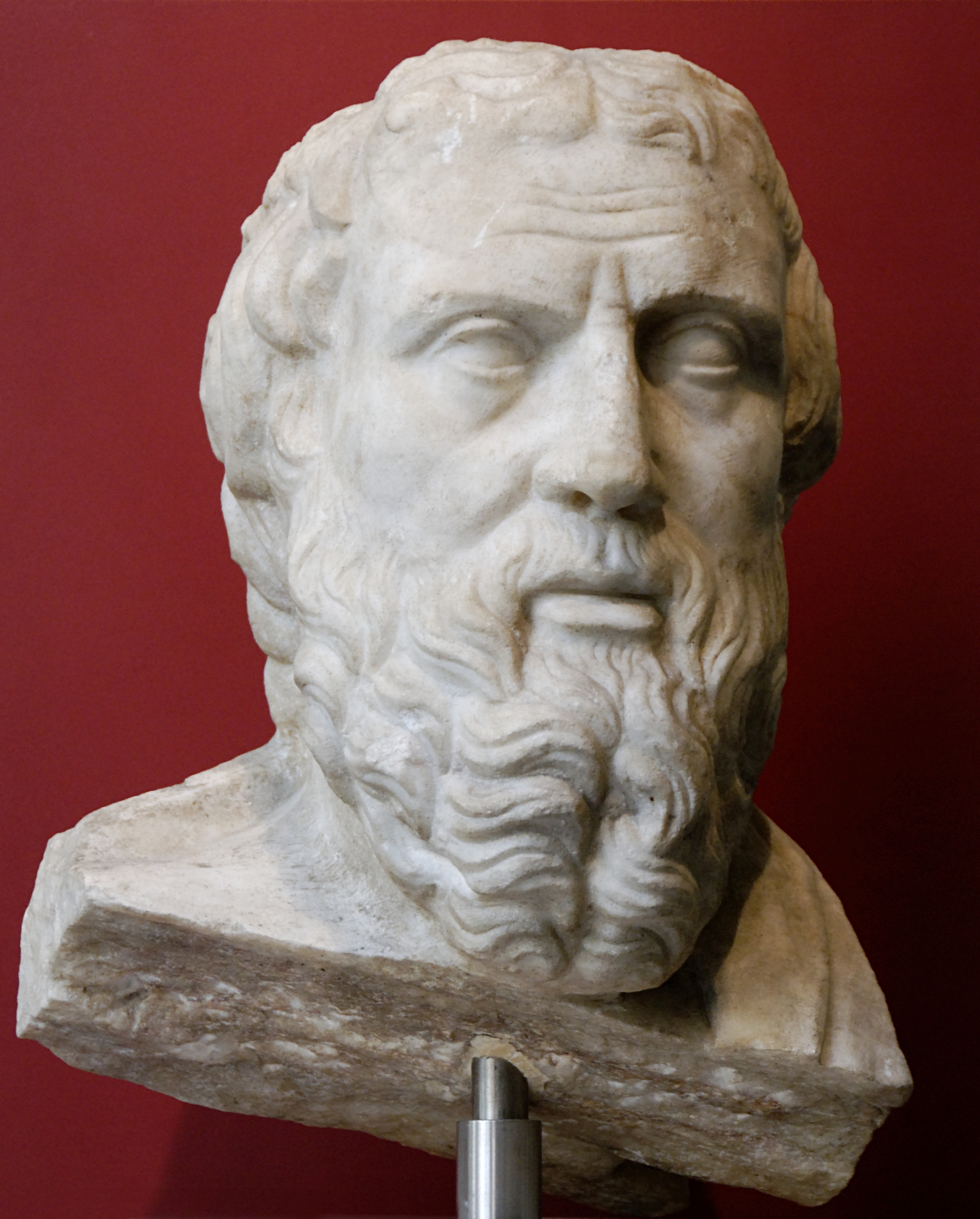
The Greek historian Herodotus was one of the first major authors to discuss the Great Pyramid.

The ancient Greek historian Herodotus, writing in the 5th century BC, is one of the first major authors to mention the pyramid. In the second book of his work The Histories, he discusses the history of Egypt and the Great Pyramid. This report was created more than 2000 years after the structure was built, meaning that Herodotus obtained his knowledge mainly from a variety of indirect sources, including officials and priests of low rank, local Egyptians, Greek immigrants, and Herodotus's own interpreters. Accordingly, his explanations present themselves as a mixture of comprehensible descriptions, personal descriptions, erroneous reports, and fantastical legends; as a result, many of the speculative errors and confusions about the monument can be traced back to Herodotus and his work.

Herodotus writes that the Great Pyramid was built by Khufu (Hellenized as Cheops) who, he erroneously relays, ruled after the Ramesside Period (the 19th dynasty and the 20th dynasty). Khufu was a tyrannical king, Herodotus claims, which may explain the Greek's view that such buildings can only come about through cruel exploitation of the people. Herodotus states that gangs of 100,000 labourers worked on the building in three-month shifts, taking 20 years to build. In the first ten years a wide causeway was erected, which, according to Herodotus, was almost as impressive as the construction of the pyramids themselves. It measured nearly 1 kilometre (0.62 mi) long and 20 yards (18.3 m) wide, and elevated to a height of 16 yards (14.6 m), consisting of stone polished and carved with figures.

Underground chambers were made on the hill where the pyramids stand. These were intended to be burial places for Khufu himself and were supplied with water by a channel brought in from the Nile. Herodotus later states that at the Pyramid of Khafre (beside the Great Pyramid) the Nile flows through a built passage to an island in which Khufu is buried. Hawass interprets this to be a reference to the "Osiris Shaft", which is located at the causeway of Khafre, south of the Great Pyramid.

Herodotus described an inscription on the outside of the pyramid, which, according to his translators, indicated the amount of radishes, garlic and onions that the workers would have eaten while working on the pyramid. This could be a note of restoration work that Khaemweset, son of Rameses II, had carried out. Apparently, Herodotus' companions and interpreters could not read the hieroglyphs or deliberately gave him false information.

==== Diodorus Siculus ====
Between 60 and 56 BC, the ancient Greek historian Diodorus Siculus visited Egypt and later dedicated the first book of his Bibliotheca historica to the land, its history, and its monuments, including the Great Pyramid. Diodorus's work was inspired by historians of the past, but he also distanced himself from Herodotus, who Diodorus claims tells marvellous tales and myths. Diodorus presumably drew his knowledge from the lost work of Hecataeus of Abdera, and like Herodotus, he also places the builder of the pyramid, "Chemmis", after Ramses III. According to his report, neither Chemmis (Khufu) nor Cephren (Khafre) were buried in their pyramids, but rather in secret places, for fear that the people ostensibly forced to build the structures would seek out the bodies for revenge. With this assertion, Diodorus strengthened the connection between pyramid building and slavery.

According to Diodorus, the cladding of the pyramid was still in excellent condition at the time, whereas the uppermost part of the pyramid was formed by a platform 6 cubits (3.1 m; 10.3 ft) high. About the construction of the pyramid he notes that it was built with the help of ramps since no lifting tools had yet been invented. Nothing was left of the ramps, as they were removed after the pyramids were completed. He estimated the number of workers necessary to erect the Great Pyramid at 360,000 and the construction time at 20 years. Similar to Herodotus, Diodorus also claims that the side of the pyramid is inscribed with writing that "[set] forth [the price of] vegetables and purgatives for the workmen there were paid out over sixteen hundred talents."

==== Strabo ====
The Greek geographer, philosopher, and historian Strabo visited Egypt around 25 BC, shortly after Egypt was annexed by the Romans. In his work Geographica, he argues that the pyramids were the burial place of kings, but he does not mention which king was buried in the structure. Strabo also mentions: "At a moderate height in one of the sides is a stone, which may be taken out; when that is removed, there is an oblique passage to the tomb." This statement has generated much speculation, as it suggests that the pyramid could be entered at this time.

==== Pliny the Elder ====
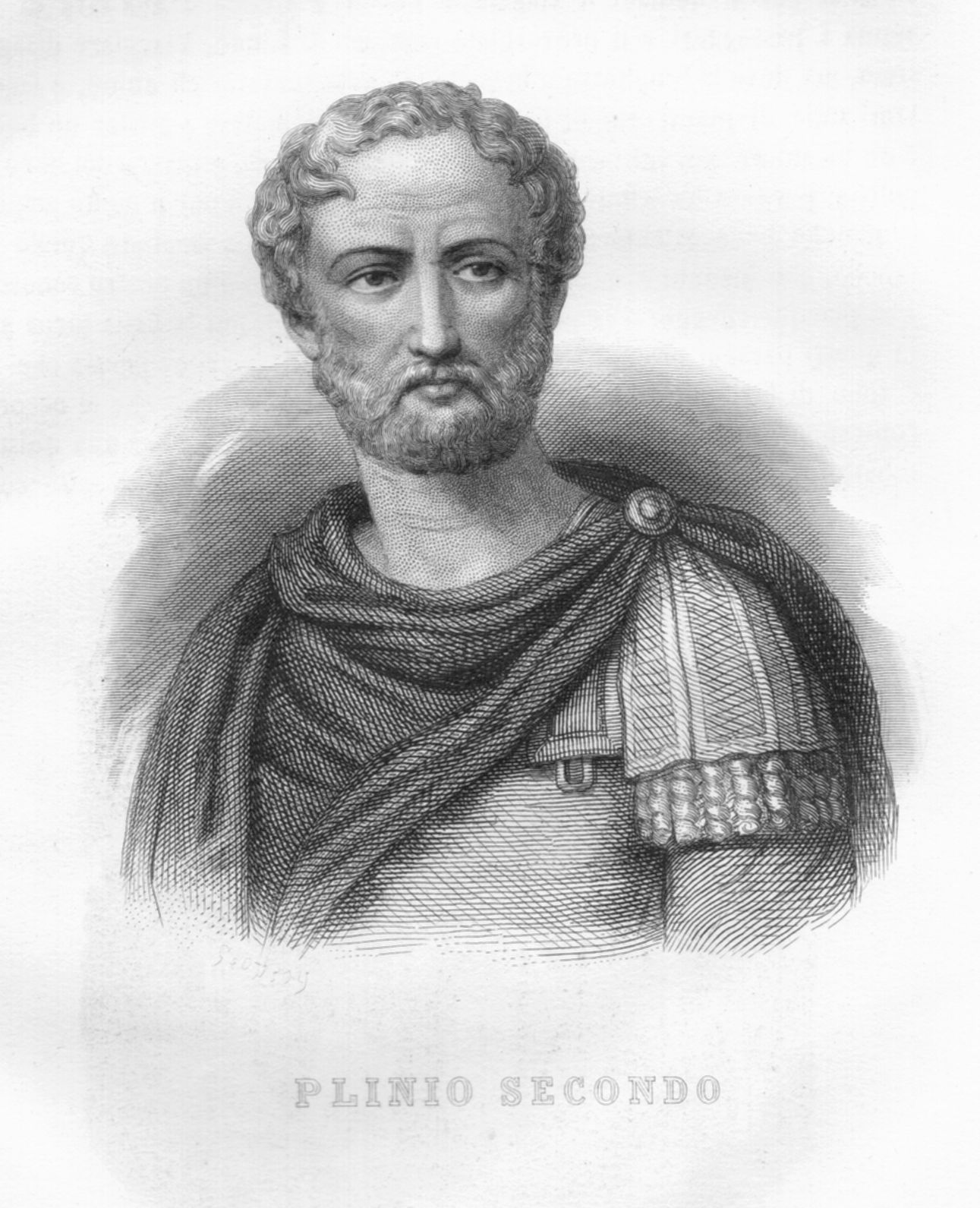
During the Roman Empire, Pliny the Elder argues that "bridges" were used to transport stones to the top of the Great Pyramid.

The Roman writer Pliny the Elder, writing in the first century AD, argued that the Great Pyramid had been raised, either "to prevent the lower classes from remaining unoccupied", or as a measure to prevent the pharaoh's riches from falling into the hands of his rivals or successors. Pliny does not speculate as to the pharaoh in question, explicitly noting that "accident [has] consigned to oblivion the names of those who erected such stupendous memorials of their vanity".

In pondering how the stones could be transported to such a vast height he gives two explanations: That either vast mounds of nitre and salt were heaped up against the pyramid, which were then melted away with water redirected from the river. Or, that "bridges" were constructed, their bricks afterwards distributed for erecting houses, arguing that the level of the river is too low for canals to bring water up to the pyramid. Pliny also recounts how "in the interior of the largest Pyramid there is a well, eighty-six cubits [45.1 m; 147.8 ft] deep, which communicates with the river, it is thought". He also describes a method discovered by Thales of Miletus for ascertaining the pyramid's height by measuring its shadow.

=== Late antiquity and the Middle Ages ===
==== Oblivion ====
During late antiquity, a misinterpretation of the pyramids as "Joseph's granary" began to gain in popularity. The first textual evidence of this connection is found in the travel narratives of the female Christian pilgrim Egeria, who records that on her visit between 381 and 384 AD, "in the twelve-mile stretch between Memphis and Babylonia [= Old Cairo] are many pyramids, which Joseph made in order to store corn." Ten years later the usage is confirmed in the anonymous travelogue of seven monks who set out from Jerusalem to visit the famous ascetics in Egypt, wherein they report that they "saw Joseph's granaries, where he stored grain in biblical times".

This late 4th-century usage is further confirmed in the geographical treatise Cosmographia, written by Julius Honorius around 376 AD, which explains that the Pyramids were called the "granaries of Joseph" (horrea Ioseph). This reference from Julius is important, as it indicates that the identification was starting to spread out from pilgrim's travelogues. In 530 AD, Stephanos of Byzantium added more to this idea when he wrote in his Ethnica that the word "pyramid" was connected to the Greek word πυρός (pyros), meaning wheat.

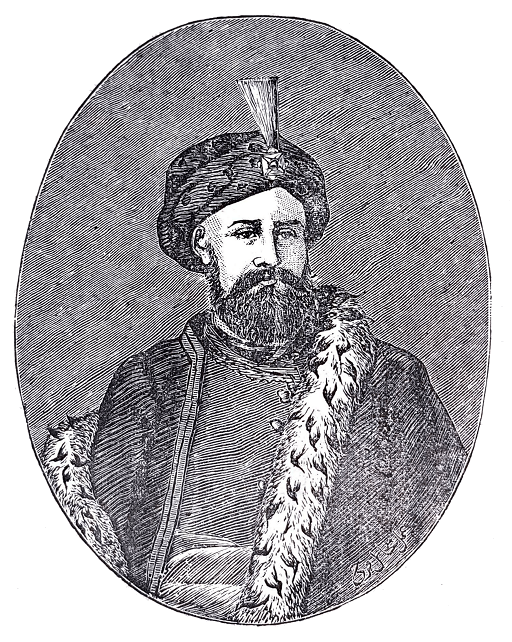
The Abbasid Caliph al-Ma'mun (786–833 CE) is said to have tunnelled into the side of the Great Pyramid.

In 642, the Rashidun Caliphate conquered Egypt, ending several centuries of Romano-Byzantine rule. A few centuries later, in 832 AD, the Abbasid caliph al-Ma'mun (786–833) is said to have tunnelled into the side of the structure and discovered the ascending passage and its connecting chambers. Around this time a Coptic legend gained popularity that claimed the antediluvian king Surid Ibn Salhouk had built the Great Pyramid. One legend in particular relates how, three hundred years prior to the Great Flood, Surid had a terrifying dream of the world's end, and so he ordered the construction of the pyramids so that they might house all the knowledge of Egypt and survive into the present.

The most notable account of this legend was given by al-Masudi (896–956) in his Akbar al-zaman, alongside imaginative tales about the pyramid, such as the story of a man who fell three hours down the pyramid's well and the tale of an expedition that discovered bizarre finds in the structure's inner chambers. Al-zaman also contains a report of al-Ma'mun's entering the pyramid and discovering an emerald jar containing a thousand coins, (each weighing four ounces), which just happened to cover the cost of opening the pyramid. (Some speculate that this story is true, but that the coins were planted by Al-Ma'mun to appease his workers, who were likely frustrated that they had found no treasure.)

In 987 AD, the Arab bibliographer Ibn al-Nadim relates a fantastical tale in his al-Fihrist about a man who journeyed into the main chamber of a pyramid, which Bayard Dodge argues is the Great Pyramid. According to Ibn al-Nadim, the person in question saw a statue of a man holding a tablet and a woman holding a mirror. Supposedly, between the statues was a "stone vessel [with] a gold cover". Inside the vessel was "something like pitch", and when the explorer reached into the vessel "a gold receptacle happened to be inside". The receptacle, when taken from the vessel, was filled with "fresh blood", which quickly dried up. Ibn al-Nadim's work also claims that the bodies of a man and woman were discovered inside the pyramid in the "best possible state of preservation".

The author al-Kaisi, in his work the Tohfat Alalbab, retells the story of al-Ma'mun's entry but with the additional discovery of "an image of a man in green stone", which when opened revealed a body dressed in jewel-encrusted gold armour. Al-Kaisi claims to have seen the case from which the body was taken, and asserts that it was located at the king's palace in Cairo. He also writes that he entered into the pyramid and discovered many preserved bodies. Another attempt to enter the pyramid in search of treasure is recorded during the vizierate of al-Afdal Shahanshah (1094–1121), but it was abandoned after a member of the party was lost in the passages.

The Arab polymath Abd al-Latif al-Baghdadi (1163–1231) studied the pyramid with great care, and in his Account of Egypt, he praises them as works of engineering genius. In addition to measuring the structure, alongside the other pyramids at Giza, al-Baghdadi also writes that the structures were surely tombs, although he thought the Great Pyramid was used for the burial of Agathodaimon or Hermes. Al-Baghdadi ponders whether the pyramid pre-dated the Great Flood as described in Genesis, and even briefly entertained the idea that it was a pre-Adamic construction. A few centuries later, the Islamic historian Al-Maqrizi (1364–1442) compiled lore about the Great Pyramid in his Al-Khitat. In addition to reasserting that Al-Ma'mun breached the structure in 820 AD, Al-Maqrizi's work also discusses the sarcophagus in the coffin chambers, explicitly noting that the pyramid was a grave.

Although the belief that the Pyramids were granaries built by Joseph was popular, in the ninth century, Dionysius I Telmaharoyo disagreed with this notion, saying they were tombs, and solid.

By the Late Middle Ages, the Great Pyramid had gained a reputation as a haunted structure. Others feared entering because it was home to animals like bats.

==== Rediscovery ====
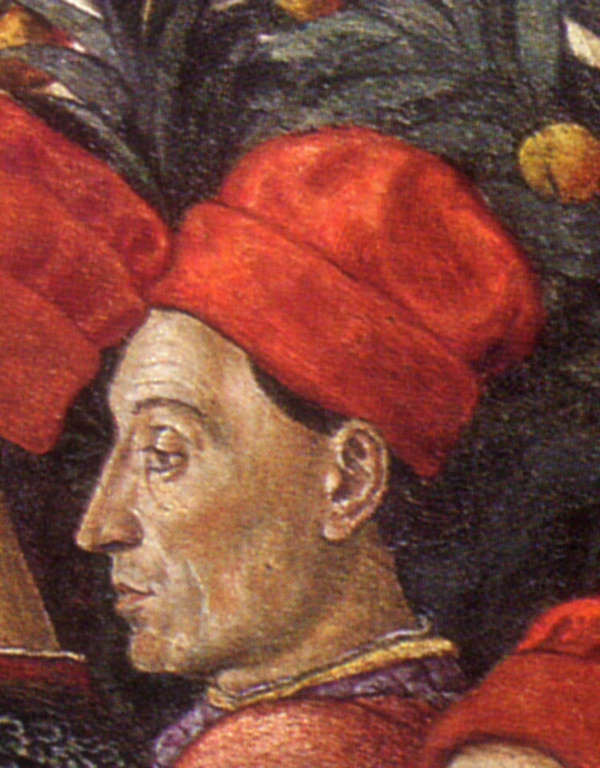
Portrait of Cyriacus of Ancona, fresco by Benozzo Gozzoli, 1459

During the period of Humanism, a new interest in the ancient world arose, which was rediscovered mainly through the study of the texts of classical authors; Cyriacus of Ancona, the founding father of modern classical archaeology, distinguished himself from other humanists because he combined the study of ancient texts with the search for material evidence, such as statues, epigraphs and monuments, reporting information about them in his travel diaries (the Commentarii) and in his letters. For this reason, in 1435, he went to Egypt and reached the Giza plateau after sailing on the Nile. Comparing what he saw with his reading of the second book of the "Histories" by Herodotus, he rediscovered the true nature of the Great Pyramid and corrected centuries of misunderstandings.

Cyriacus of Ancona thus definitively refuted the false identification of the Great Pyramid with one of the Joseph's Granaries and left several drawings of the monument and an account, reported in his Commentarii. Thanks to his numerous travels in Greece and Asia Minor, he was also able to testify that the pyramids of Giza were the only one of the Seven Wonders of the World to have survived the centuries. Through the writings of Ciriaco, this news spread first in Italian humanist circles and then among European scholars.

== Construction ==
=== Preparation of the site ===
A hillock forms the base on which the pyramid stands. It was cut back into steps and only a strip around the perimeter was leveled, which has been measured to be horizontal and flat to within 21 millimetres (0.8 in). The bedrock reaches a height of almost 6 metres (20 ft) above the pyramid base at the location of the Grotto.

Along the sides of the base platform a series of holes are cut in the bedrock. Lehner hypothesizes that they held wooden posts used for alignment. Edwards, among others, suggested the use of water for evening the base, although it is unclear how practical and workable such a system would be.

=== Materials ===
Origins of the materials used for Khufu's pyramid complex

The Great Pyramid consists of an estimated 2.3 million blocks. Approximately 5.5 million tonnes of limestone, 8,000 tonnes of granite, and 500,000 tonnes of mortar were used in the construction.

Most of the blocks were quarried at Giza just south of the pyramid, an area now known as the Central Field. They are a particular type of nummulitic limestone formed of the fossils of prehistoric shell creatures, whose small disc form can still be seen in some of the pyramid's blocks upon close inspection. Other fossils have been found in the blocks and other structures on the site, including fossilized shark teeth. The white limestone used for the casing was transported by boat across the Nile from the Tura quarries of the Eastern Desert plateau, about 10 km (6.2 mi) south-east of the Giza plateau. In 2013, rolls of papyrus called the Diary of Merer were discovered, written by a supervisor of the deliveries of limestone from Tura to Giza in the 27th year of Khufu's reign.

The granite stones in the pyramid were transported from Aswan, more than 900 km (560 mi) south. The largest, weighing 25 to 80 tonnes, form the ceilings of the "King's chamber" and the "relieving chambers" above it. Ancient Egyptians cut stone into rough blocks by hammering grooves into natural stone faces, inserting wooden wedges, then soaking these with water. As the water was absorbed, the wedges expanded, breaking off workable chunks. Once the blocks were cut, they were carried by boat on the Nile to the pyramid and used a now dry offshoot of the river to transport blocks closer to the site.

=== Workforce ===
The ancient Greeks believed that slave labour was used, but modern discoveries made at nearby workers' camps associated with construction at Giza suggest that it was built by thousands of conscript labourers.

Worker graffiti found at Giza suggest haulers were divided into zau (singular za), groups of 40 men, consisting of four sub-units that each had an "Overseer of Ten".

As to the question of how over two million blocks could have been cut within Khufu's lifetime, stonemason Franck Burgos conducted an archaeological experiment based on an abandoned quarry of Khufu discovered in 2017. Within it, an almost completed block and the tools used for cutting it had been uncovered: hardened arsenic copper chisels, wooden mallets, ropes and stone tools. In the experiment replicas of these were used to cut a block weighing about 2.5 tonnes (the average block size used for the Great Pyramid). It took four workers 4 days (with each working 6 hours a day) to excavate it. The initially slow progress sped up six times when the stone was wetted with water. Based on the data, Burgos extrapolates that about 3,500 quarry-men could have produced the 250 blocks/day needed to complete the Great Pyramid in 27 years.

A construction management study conducted in 1999, in association with Mark Lehner and other Egyptologists, had estimated that the total project required an average workforce of about 13,200 people and a peak workforce of roughly 40,000.

=== Surveys and design ===
Comparison of approximate profiles of the Great Pyramid of Giza with some notable pyramidal or near-pyramidal buildings. Dotted lines indicate original heights, where data is available. In its SVG file, hover over a pyramid to highlight and click for its article.

The first precise measurements of the pyramid were made by Egyptologist Flinders Petrie in 1880–1882, published as The Pyramids and Temples of Gizeh. Many of the casing-stones and inner chamber blocks of the Great Pyramid fit together with high precision, with joints, on average, only 0.5 millimetres (0.020 in) wide. In contrast, core blocks were only roughly shaped, with rubble inserted between larger gaps. Mortar was used to bind the outer layers together and fill gaps and joints.

The block height and weight tends to get progressively smaller towards the top. Petrie measured the lowest layer to be 148 centimetres (4.86 ft) high, whereas the layers towards the summit barely exceed 50 centimetres (1.6 ft).

The accuracy of the pyramid's perimeter is such that the four sides of the base have an average error of only 58 millimetres (2.3 inches) in length (Note: Based on side lengths 230.252 m, 230.454 m, 230.391 m, 230.357 m.) and the finished base was squared to a mean corner error of only 12 seconds of arc.

The completed design dimensions are measured to have originally been 280 royal cubits (146.7 m; 481.4 ft) high by 440 cubits (230.6 m; 756.4 ft) long at each of the four sides of its base. Ancient Egyptians used seked – how much run for one cubit of rise – to describe slopes. For the Great Pyramid a seked of 5 1/2 palms was chosen, a ratio of 14 up to 11 in.

Some Egyptologists suggest this slope was chosen because the ratio of perimeter to height (1760/280 cubits) equals 2π to an accuracy of better than 0.05 percent (corresponding to the well-known approximation of π as 22/7). Verner wrote, "We can conclude that although the ancient Egyptians could not precisely define the value of π, in practice they used it". Petrie concluded: "but these relations of areas and of circular ratio are so systematic that we should grant that they were in the builder's design". Others have argued that the ancient Egyptians had no concept of pi and would not have thought to encode it in their monuments and that the observed pyramid slope may be based on the seked choice alone.

==== Alignment to the cardinal directions ====
The sides of the Great Pyramid's base are closely aligned to the four geographic (not magnetic) cardinal directions, deviating on average 3 minutes and 38 seconds of arc, or about a tenth of a degree. Several methods have been proposed for how the ancient Egyptians achieved this level of accuracy:

- The solar gnomon method: The shadow of a vertical rod is tracked throughout a day. The shadow line is intersected by a circle drawn around the base of the rod. Connecting the intersecting points produces an east–west line. An experiment using this method resulted in lines being, on average, 2 minutes, 9 seconds off due east–west. Employing a pinhole produced much more accurate results (19 arc seconds off), whereas using an angled block as a shadow definer was less accurate (3′ 47″ off).
- The pole star method: The polar star is tracked using a movable sight and fixed plumb line. Halfway between the maximum eastern and western elongations is true north. Thuban, the polar star during the Old Kingdom, was about two degrees removed from the celestial pole at the time.
- The simultaneous transit method: The stars Mizar and Kochab appear on a vertical line on the horizon, close to true north around 2500 BC. They slowly and simultaneously shift east over time, which is used to explain the relative misalignment of the pyramids.

=== Construction theories ===
Many alternative, often contradictory, theories have been proposed regarding the pyramid's construction techniques. One mystery of the pyramid's construction is its planning. John Romer suggests that they used the same method that had been used for earlier and later constructions, laying out parts of the plan on the ground at a 1-to-1 scale. He writes that "such a working diagram would also serve to generate the architecture of the pyramid with precision unmatched by any other means".

The basalt blocks of the pyramid temple show "clear evidence" of having been cut with some kind of saw with an estimated cutting blade of 15 feet (4.6 m) in length. Romer suggests that this "super saw" may have had copper teeth and weighed up to 140 kilograms (310 lb). He theorizes that such a saw could have been attached to a wooden trestle support and possibly used in conjunction with vegetable oil, cutting sand, emery or pounded quartz to cut the blocks, which would have required the labour of at least a dozen men to operate it.

== Casing ==
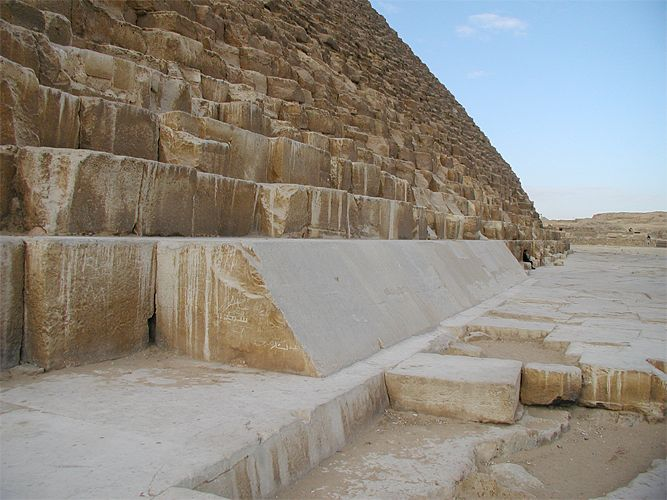
Remaining casing stones on the north side of the Great Pyramid

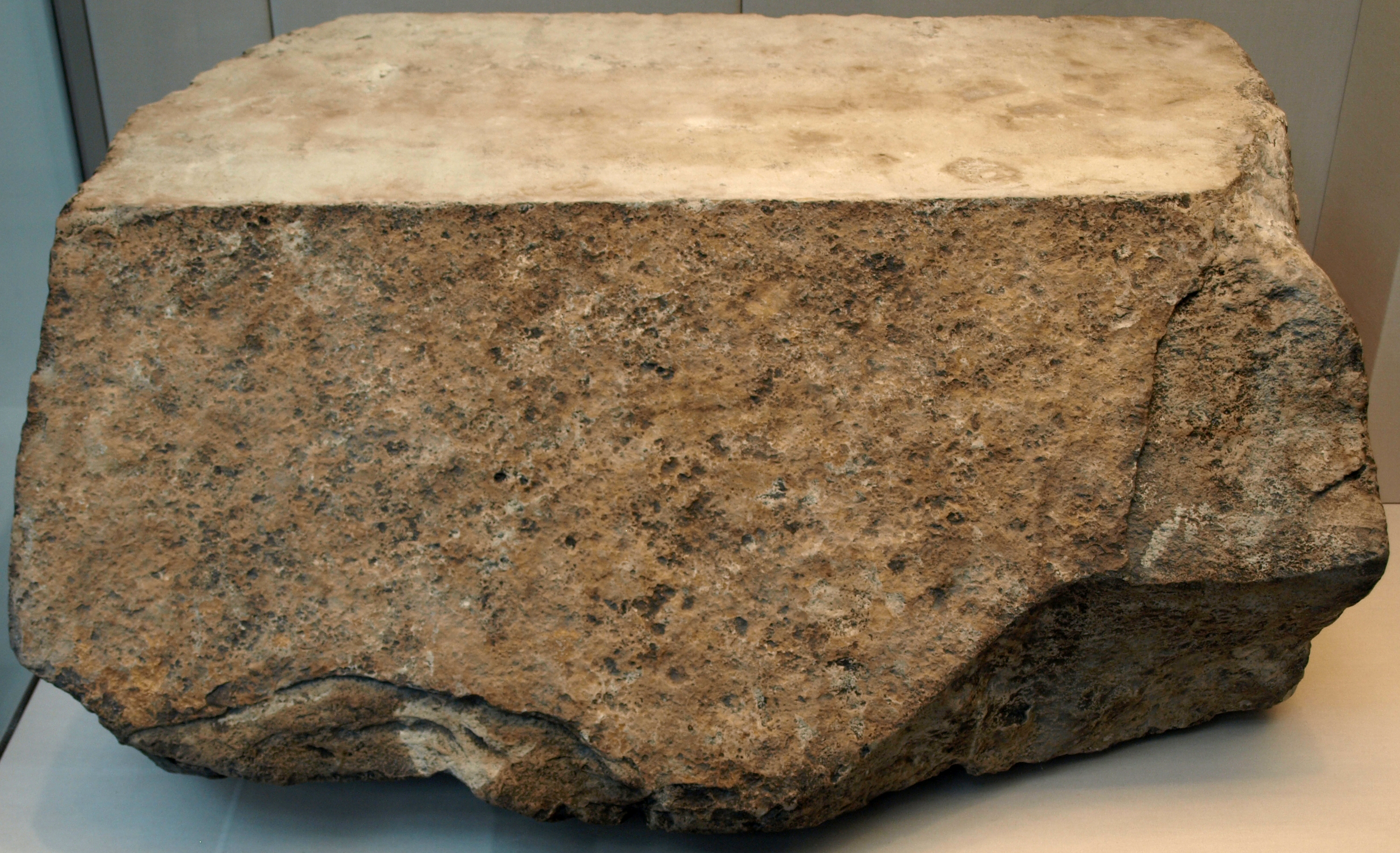
A casing stone in the British Museum

At completion, the Great Pyramid was cased entirely in white limestone. Precisely worked blocks were placed in horizontal layers and carefully fitted together with mortar, their outward faces cut at a slope and smoothed to a high degree. Together they created four uniform surfaces, angled at 51°50'40" (a seked of 5 1/2 palms). Unfinished casing blocks of the pyramids of Menkaure and Henutsen at Giza suggest that the front faces were smoothed only after the stones were laid, with chiselled seams marking correct positioning and where the superfluous rock would have to be trimmed off.

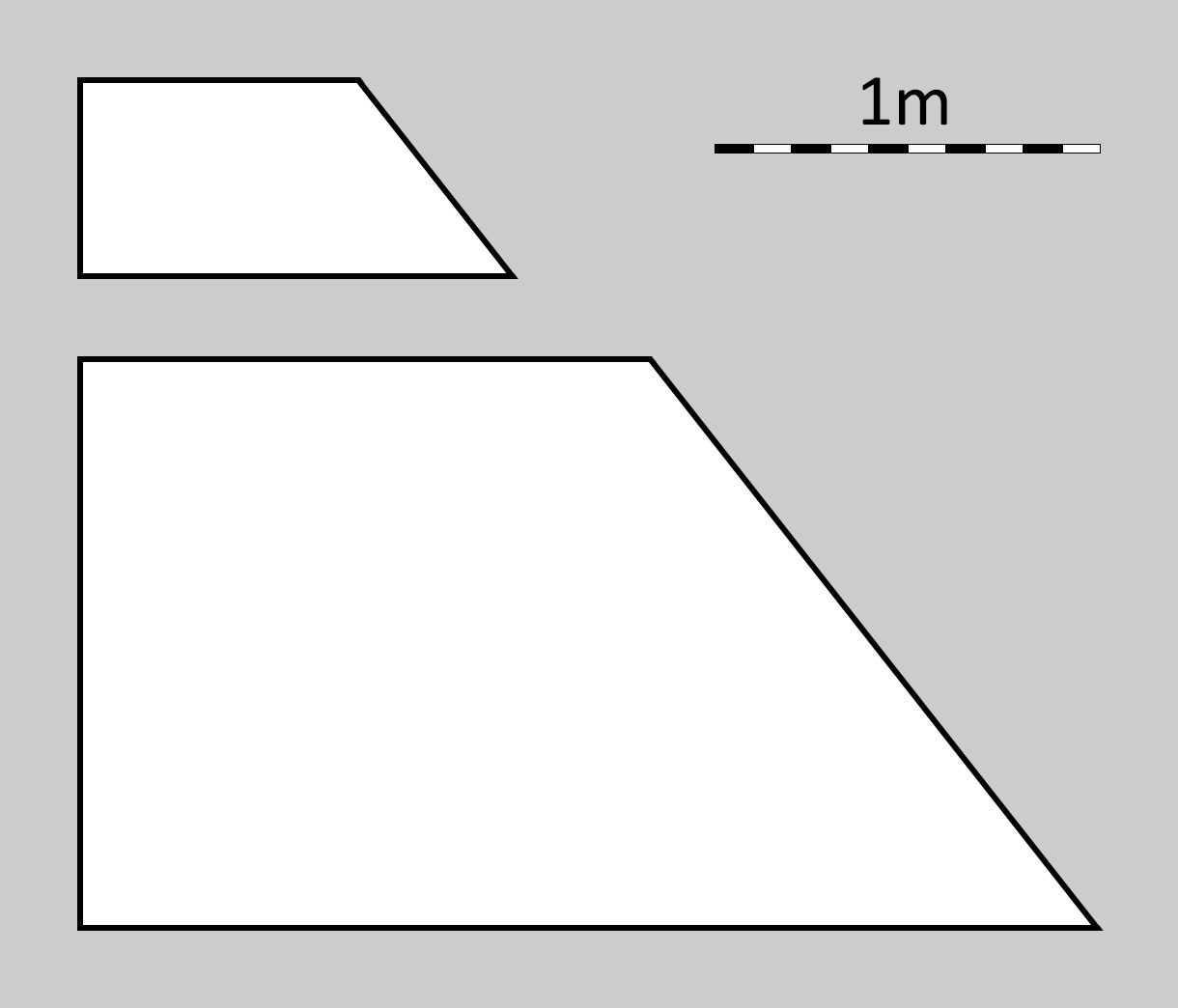
The size of a casing stone from the first layer (bottom) compared with one of the upper layers (top)

The height of the horizontal layers is not uniform but varies considerably. The highest of the 203 remaining courses are towards the bottom, the first layer being the tallest at 1.49 metres (4.9 ft). Towards the top, layers tend to be only slightly over 1 royal cubit (0.5 m; 1.7 ft) in height, with stones weighing around 500 kilograms (1,100 lb). An irregular pattern is noticeable when looking at the sizes in sequence, where layer height declines steadily only to rise sharply again.

So-called "backing stones" supported the casing, which were (unlike core blocks), precisely dressed as well and bound to the casing with mortar. Now, these stones give the structure its visible appearance, following the partial dismantling of the pyramid in the Middle Ages. Amidst earthquakes in northern Egypt, workers stripped away many of the outer casing stones, which were said to have been carted away by Bahri Sultan An-Nasir Nasir-ad-Din al-Hasan in 1356 for use in nearby Cairo.

Later explorers reported massive piles of rubble at the base of the pyramids left over from the continuing collapse of the casing stones, which were subsequently cleared away during continuing excavations of the site. Today a few of the casing stones from the lowest course can be seen in situ on each side, with the best preserved on the north below the entrances, excavated by Vyse in 1837.

The mortar was chemically analyzed and contains organic inclusions (mostly charcoal), samples of which were radiocarbon dated to 2871–2604 BC. It has been theorized that the mortar enabled the masons to set the stones exactly by providing a level bed.

Although it has been suggested that some or all of the casing stones were made from a type of concrete that was cast in place, rather than quarried and moved, archaeological evidence and petrographic analysis indicate this was not the case.

Petrie noted in 1880 the four sides of the pyramid to be "very distinctly hollowed" and that "each side has a sort of groove specially down the middle of the face", which he reasoned was a result of increased casing thickness in these areas. Under certain lighting conditions and with image enhancement the faces can appear to be split, leading to speculation that the pyramid had been intentionally constructed eight-sided. Laser scanning and photogrammetrical surveys concluded the concavities of the four sides to be the result of the removal of the casing stones, which damaged the underlying blocks that form the outer surface today.

== Pyramidion and missing tip ==
The pyramid was once topped by a capstone known as a pyramidion. The material from which it was made is subject to much speculation; limestone, granite or basalt are commonly proposed, while in popular culture it is often solid gold, gilded or electrum. All known 4th dynasty pyramidia (of the Red Pyramid, Satellite Pyramid of Khufu (G1-d) and Queen's Pyramid of Menkaure (G3-a)) are of white limestone and were not gilded. Only from the 5th dynasty onward is there evidence of gilded capstones; for instance, a scene on the causeway of Sahure speaks of the "white gold pyramidion of the pyramid Sahure's Soul Shines".

The Great Pyramid's pyramidion was already lost in classical antiquity, as Pliny the Elder and later authors report a platform on its summit. Over time more stones were removed from the peak, and nowadays the pyramid is about 8 metres (26 ft) shorter than it was when intact, with about 1,000 tonnes (2,200,000 lb) of material missing from the top.

In 1874 a mast was installed on the top by the Scottish astronomer David Gill who, while returning from observing a rare Venus transit, was invited to survey Egypt and began by surveying the Great Pyramid. His measurements of the pyramid were accurate to within 1 mm. The mast was damaged in 2019 by a man who evaded security and climbed the pyramid; however, as the mast was periodically changed due to erosion and so was considered a modern object, the trespasser did not violate Egypt's strict laws regarding antiquities.

== Interior ==
Elevation diagram of the interior structures of the Great Pyramid viewed from the east. The inner and outer lines indicate the pyramid's present and original profiles.: 1. Original entrance, North Face Corridor; 2. Robbers' Tunnel (tourist entrance); 3, 4. Descending Passage; 5. Subterranean Chamber; 6. Ascending Passage; 7. Queen's Chamber and its "air-shafts"; 8. Horizontal Passage; 9. Grand Gallery; 10. King's Chamber and its "air-shafts"; 11. Grotto and Well Shaft

The internal structure consists of three main chambers (the King's, Queen's and Subterranean Chambers), the Grand Gallery and various corridors and shafts. None of the interior walls were decorated or inscribed, as was the norm for tombs of the 4th dynasty, apart from the marks and names of work-gangs left on blocks of the relieving chambers.

There are two entrances into the pyramid: the original and a forced passage, which meet at a junction. From there, one passage descends into the Subterranean Chamber, while the other ascends to the Grand Gallery. From the beginning of the gallery three paths can be taken:

- a vertical shaft that leads down, past a grotto, to meet the descending passage
- a horizontal corridor leading to the Queen's Chamber
- and the path up the gallery itself to the King's Chamber that contains the sarcophagus.

Both the King's and Queen's Chamber have a pair of small "air-shafts". Above the King's Chamber are a series of five relieving chambers.

=== Entrances ===
==== Original entrance ====
The original entrance is on the north side, 15 royal cubits (7.9 m; 25.8 ft) east of the centreline of the pyramid. Before the removal of the casing in the Middle Ages, the pyramid was entered through a hole in the 19th layer of masonry, approximately 17 metres (56 ft) above the pyramid's base level. The height of that layer – 96 centimetres (3.15 ft) – corresponds to the size of the entrance tunnel that is commonly called the Descending Passage. According to Strabo (64–24 BC) a movable stone could be raised to enter this sloping corridor; however, it is not known if it was a later addition or original.

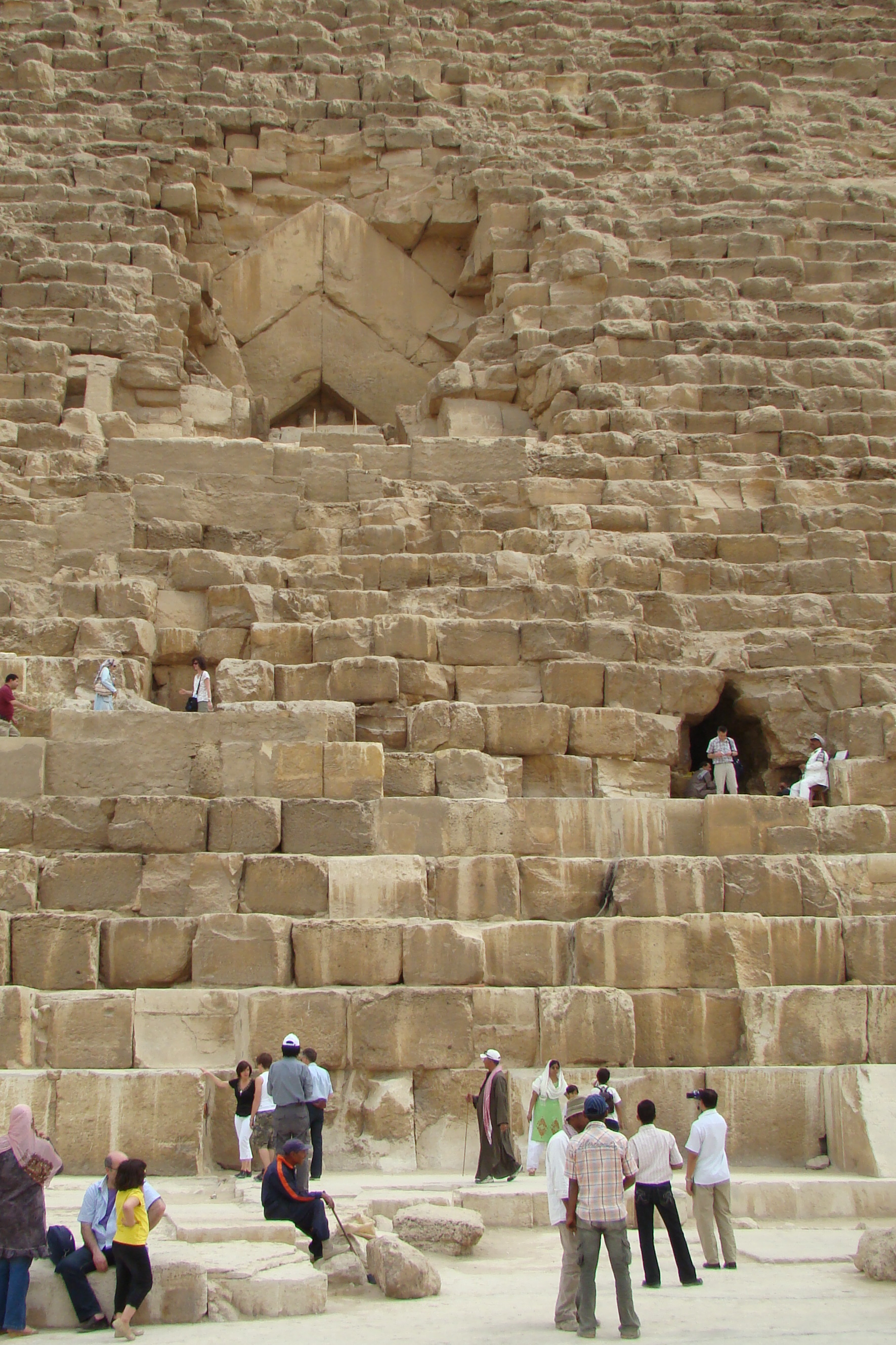
The original entrance (top-left), Robbers' Tunnel (middle-right)

A row of double chevrons diverts weight away from the entrance. Several of these chevron blocks are now missing, as indicated by the slanted faces on which they once rested.

Numerous, mostly modern, graffiti is cut into the stones around the entrance. Most notable is a large, square text of hieroglyphs carved in honor of Frederick William IV, by Karl Richard Lepsius's Prussian expedition to Egypt in 1842.

===== North Face Corridor =====
In 2016 the ScanPyramids team detected a cavity behind the entrance chevrons using muography, which was confirmed in 2019 to be a corridor at least 5 metres (16 ft) long, and running horizontal or sloping upwards (thus not parallel to the Descending Passage).

In February 2023 the North Face Corridor was explored with an endoscopic camera, revealing a horizontal tunnel with a length of 9 metres (30 ft) and a transverse section of about 2 by 2 metres (6.6 by 6.6 ft). Its ceiling is formed by large chevrons, like those visible above the original entrance and also similar to relieving chambers.

==== Robbers' Tunnel ====
Today tourists enter the Great Pyramid via the Robbers' Tunnel, which was long ago cut straight through the masonry of the pyramid. The entrance was forced into the 6th and 7th layer of the casing, about 7 metres (23 ft) above the base. After running more or less straight and horizontal for 27 metres (89 ft) it turns sharply left to encounter the blocking stones in the Ascending Passage. It is possible to enter the Descending Passage from this point but access is usually forbidden.

The origin of this Robbers' Tunnel is the subject of much scholarly discussion. According to tradition the opening was made around 820 AD by Caliph al-Ma'mun's workmen with a battering ram. The digging dislodged the stone in the ceiling of the Descending Passage that hid the entrance to the Ascending Passage, and the noise of that stone falling, then sliding down the Descending Passage alerted them to the need to turn left. Unable to remove these stones, the workmen tunnelled upwards beside them through the softer limestone of the Pyramid until they reached the Ascending Passage.

Due to historical and archaeological discrepancies, many scholars (with Antoine de Sacy perhaps being the first) contend that this story is apocryphal. They argue that it is much more likely that the tunnel had been carved shortly after the pyramid was initially sealed. This tunnel, the scholars continue, was then utilized by tomb robbers before being resealed (likely during the Ramesside Restoration), and it was this plug that al-Ma'mun's ninth-century expedition cleared away. This theory is furthered by the report of patriarch Dionysius I Telmaharoyo, who claimed that before al-Ma'mun's expedition, there already existed a breach in the pyramid's north face that extended into the structure 33 metres (108 ft) before hitting a dead end. This suggests that some sort of robber's tunnel predated al-Ma'mun, and that the caliph enlarged it and cleared it of debris.

=== Descending Passage ===
From the original entrance, a passage descends through the masonry of the pyramid and then into the bedrock beneath it, ultimately leading to the Subterranean Chamber.

It has a slanted height of 4 Egyptian feet (1.20 m; 3.9 ft) and a width of 2 cubits (1.0 m; 3.4 ft). Its angle of 26°26'46" corresponds to a ratio of 1 to 2 (rise over run).

After 28 metres (92 ft), the lower end of the Ascending Passage is reached; a square hole in the ceiling, which is blocked by granite stones and might have originally been concealed. To circumvent these hard stones, a short tunnel was excavated that meets the end of the Robbers' Tunnel. This was expanded over time and fitted with stairs.

The passage continues to descend for another 72 metres (236 ft), now through bedrock instead of the pyramid superstructure. Lazy guides used to block off this part with rubble to avoid having to lead people down and back up the long shaft, until around 1902 when Covington installed a padlocked iron grill-door to stop this practice. Near the end of this section, on the west wall, is the connection to the vertical shaft that leads up to the Grand Gallery.

A horizontal shaft connects the end of the Descending Passage to the Subterranean Chamber, It has a length of 8.84 m (29.0 ft), width of 85 cm (2.79 ft) and height of 91–95 cm (2.99–3.12 ft). A recess is located towards the end of the western wall, slightly larger than the tunnel, the ceiling of which is irregular and undressed.

=== Subterranean Chamber ===
The Subterranean Chamber, or "Pit", is the lowest of the three main chambers and the only one dug into the bedrock beneath the pyramid.

Located about 27 m (89 ft) below base level, it measures roughly 16 cubits (8.4 m; 27.5 ft) north-south by 27 cubits (14.1 m; 46.4 ft) east-west, with an approximate height of 4 m (13 ft). The western half of the room, apart from the ceiling, is unfinished, with trenches left behind by the quarry-men running east to west. A niche was cut into the northern half of the west wall. The only access, through the Descending Passage, lies on the eastern end of the north wall.

Although seemingly known in antiquity, according to Herodotus and later authors, its existence had been forgotten in the Middle Ages until rediscovery in 1817, when Giovanni Caviglia cleared the rubble blocking the Descending Passage.

Opposing the entrance, a blind corridor runs straight south for 11 m (36 ft) and continues with a slight bend another 5.4 m (18 ft), measuring about 0.75 m (2.5 ft) squared. A Greek or Roman character was found on its ceiling with the light of a candle, suggesting that the chamber had indeed been accessible during Classical antiquity.

In the middle of the eastern half is a large hole called a Pit Shaft or Perring's Shaft. The uppermost part may have ancient origins, about 2 m (6.6 ft) squared in width and 1.5 m (4.9 ft) in depth, diagonally aligned with the chamber. Caviglia and Salt enlarged it to the depth of about 3 m (9.8 ft). In 1837 Vyse directed the shaft to be sunk to a depth of 50 ft (15 m), in hopes of discovering the chamber encompassed by water that Herodotus alluded to. It is slightly narrower in width at about 1.5 m (4.9 ft). No chamber was discovered after Perring and his workers had spent one and a half years penetrating the bedrock to the then water level of the Nile, 12 m (39 ft) further down.

The rubble produced during this operation was deposited throughout the chamber. Petrie, visiting in 1880, found the shaft to be partially filled with rainwater that had rushed down the Descending Passage. In 1909, when the Edgar brothers' surveying activities were encumbered by the material, they moved the sand and smaller stones back into the shaft, leaving the upper part clear. The deep, modern shaft is sometimes mistaken to be part of the original design.

Ludwig Borchardt suggested that the Subterranean Chamber was originally planned to be the burial place for pharaoh Khufu, but that it was abandoned during construction in favour of a chamber higher up in the pyramid.

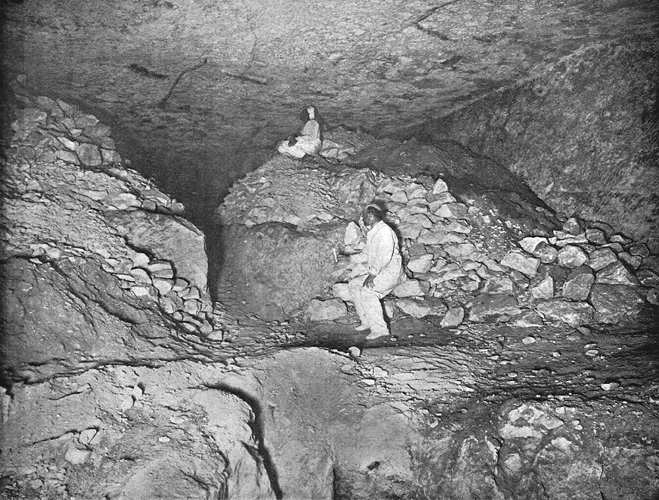
Rubble from the Pit Shaft excavation still filling the subterranean chamber in 1909

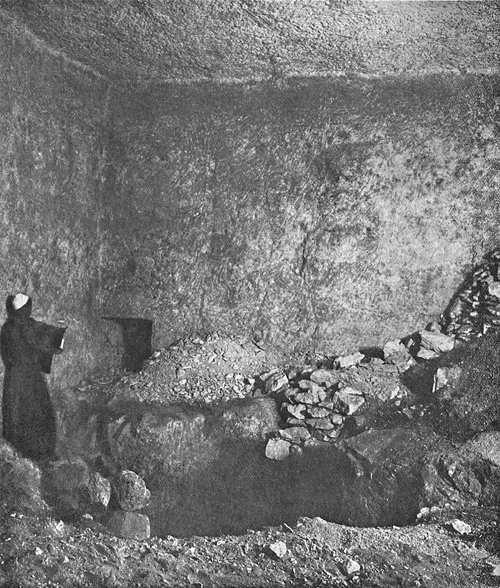
Pit Shaft in the floor, and blind corridor entrance

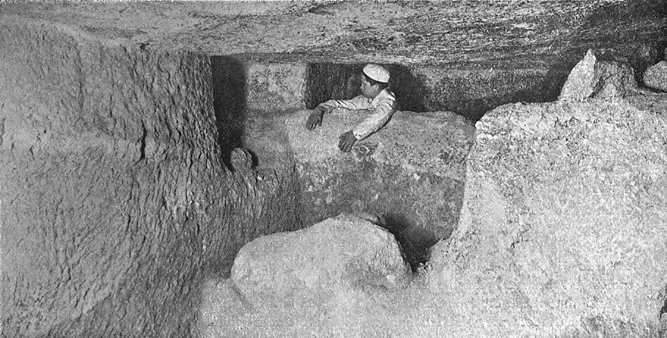
Niche in the west wall

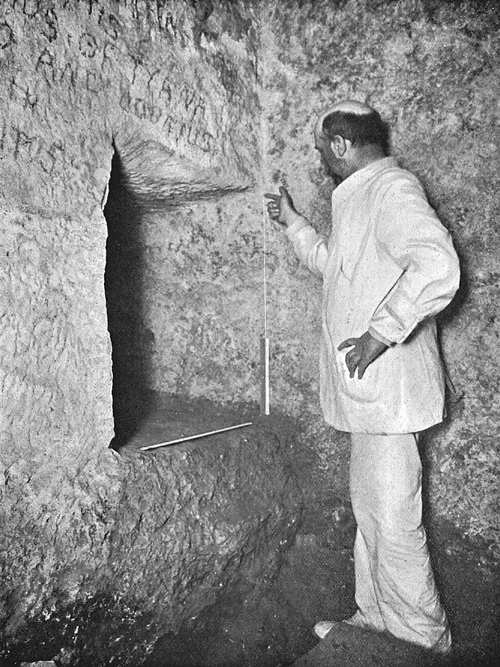
Descending Passage exiting in the north wall

=== Ascending Passage ===
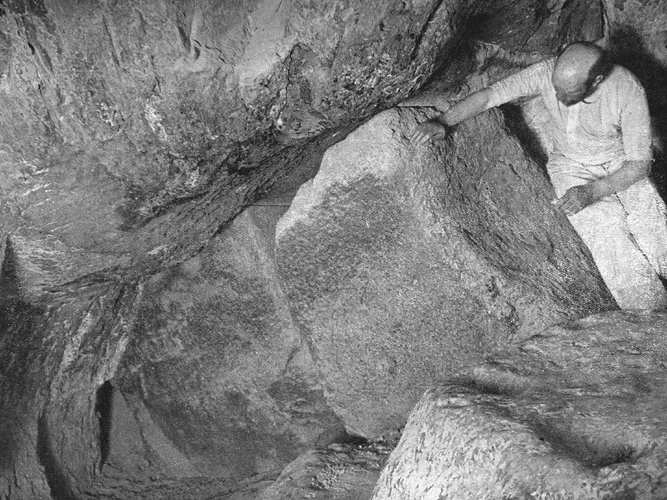
The upper two granite plugs in the Ascending Passage, seen from the end of the Robbers' Tunnel

The Ascending Passage connects the Descending Passage to the Grand Gallery. It is 75 cubits (39.3 m; 128.9 ft) long and of the same width and height as the shaft from which it originates, although its angle is slightly lower at 26°6'.

The lower end of the shaft is plugged by three granite stones, which were slid down from the Grand Gallery to seal the tunnel. They are 1.57 m (5.2 ft), 1.67 m (5.5 ft) and 1 m (3.3 ft) long respectively. The uppermost is heavily damaged, hence it is shorter. The Robbers' Tunnel terminates slightly below the stones, so a short tunnel was dug around them to access the Descending Passage, since the surrounding limestone is considerably softer and easier to work.

Most of the joints between the blocks of the walls run perpendicular to the floor, with two exceptions. Firstly, those in the lower third of the corridor are vertical. Secondly, the three girdle stones that are inserted near the middle (about 10 cubits apart) presumably stabilize the tunnel.

=== Well Shaft and Grotto ===
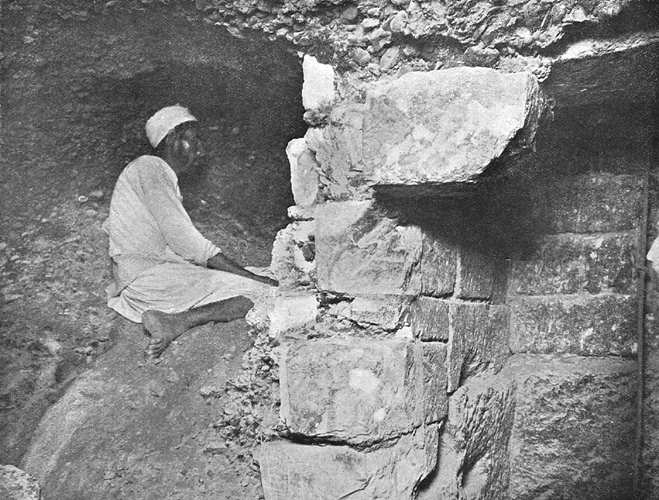
Grotto (left) accessed through the broken wall of the Well Shaft (right)

The Well Shaft (also known as the Service Shaft or Vertical Shaft) links the lower end of the Grand Gallery to the bottom of the Descending Passage, about 50 metres (160 ft) further down.

It takes a winding and indirect course. The upper half goes through the nucleus masonry of the pyramid. It runs vertical at first for 8 metres (26 ft), then slightly angles southwards for about the same distance, until it hits bedrock approximately 5.7 metres (19 ft) above the pyramid's base level. Another vertical section descends further; it is partially lined with masonry that has been broken through to a cavity known as the Grotto. The lower half of the Well Shaft goes through the bedrock at an angle of about 45° for 26.5 metres (87 ft) before a steeper section, 9.5 metres (31 ft) long, leads to its lowest point. The final section of 2.6 metres (8.5 ft) connects it to the Descending Passage, running almost horizontally. The builders evidently had trouble aligning the lower exit.

The purpose of the shaft is commonly explained as a ventilation shaft for the Subterranean Chamber and as an escape shaft for the workers who slid the blocking stones of the Ascending Passage into place.

The Grotto is a natural limestone cave that was likely filled with sand and gravel before construction, before being hollowed out by looters. A granite block rests in it that likely originated from the portcullis that once sealed the King's Chamber.

=== Queen's Chamber ===
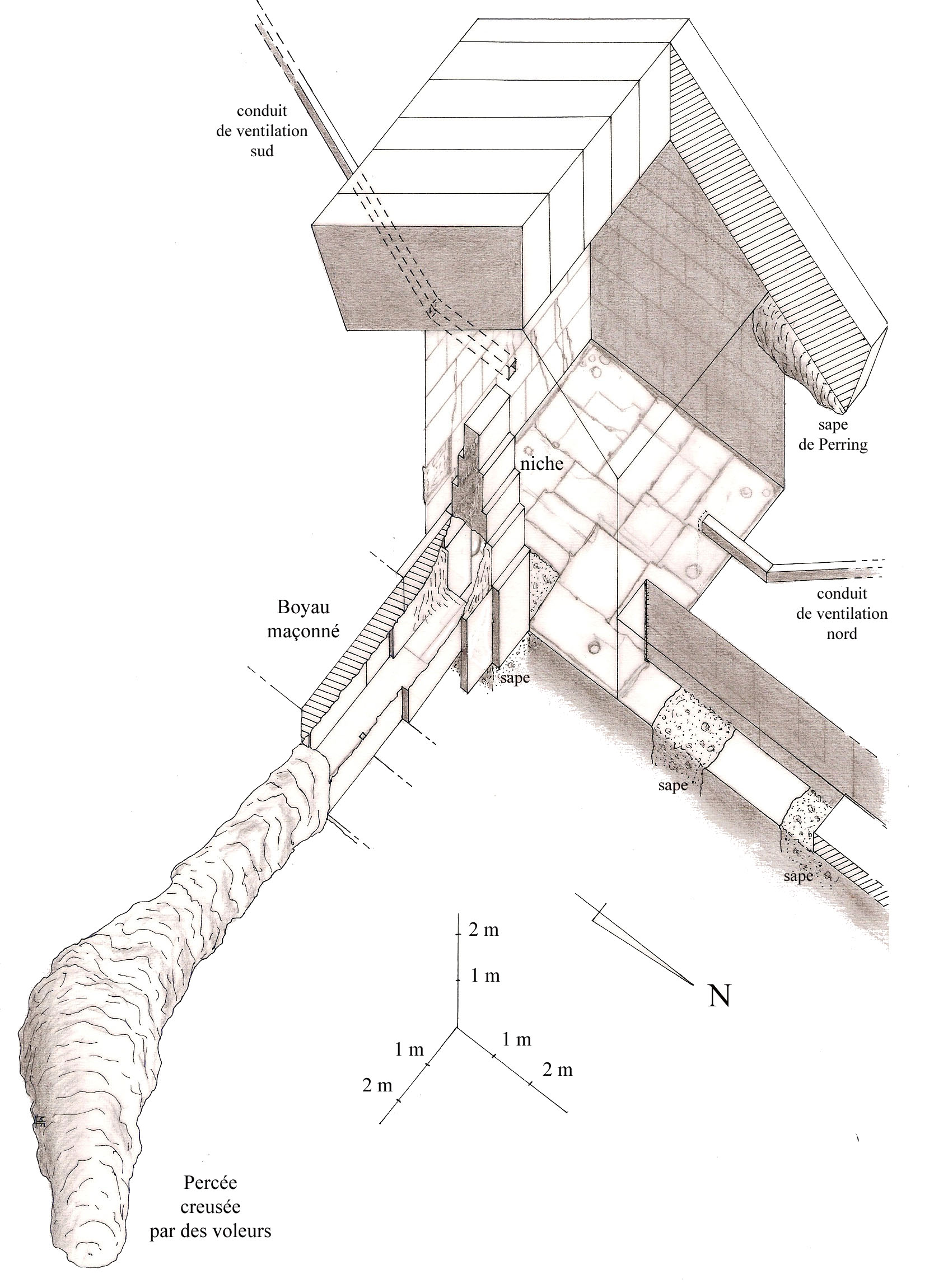
Axonometric view of the Queen's Chamber

The Horizontal Passage links the Grand Gallery to the Queen's Chamber. Five pairs of holes at the start suggest the tunnel was once concealed with slabs that lay flush with the gallery floor. The passage is 2 cubits (1.0 m; 3.4 ft) wide and 1.17 m (3.8 ft) high for most of its length, but near the chamber there is a step in the floor, after which the passage increases to 1.68 m (5.5 ft) high. Half of the west wall consists of two layers that have atypically continuous vertical joints. Dormion suggests the entrances to magazines laid here and have been filled in.

The Queen's Chamber is exactly halfway between the north and south faces of the pyramid. It measures 10 cubits (5.2 m; 17.2 ft) north-south, 11 cubits (5.8 m; 18.9 ft) east-west, and has a pointed roof that apexes at 12 cubits (6.3 m; 20.6 ft) tall. At the eastern end of the chamber is a niche 9 cubits (4.7 m; 15.5 ft) high. The original depth of the niche was 2 cubits (1.0 m; 3.4 ft), but it has since been deepened by treasure hunters.

Shafts were discovered in the north and south walls of the Queen's Chamber in 1872 by British engineer Waynman Dixon, who believed shafts similar to those in the King's Chamber must also exist. The shafts were not connected to the outer faces of the pyramid or the Queen's Chamber; their purpose is unknown. In one shaft Dixon discovered a ball of diorite, a bronze hook of unknown purpose and a piece of cedar wood. The first two objects are now in the British Museum. The latter was lost until 2020 when it was found at the University of Aberdeen. It has since been radiocarbon dated to 3341–3094 BC. The northern shaft's angle of ascent fluctuates and at one point turns 45 degrees to avoid the Great Gallery. The southern shaft is perpendicular to the pyramid's slope.

The shafts in the Queen's Chamber were explored in 1993 by the German engineer Rudolf Gantenbrink using a crawler robot he designed, Upuaut 2. After a climb of 65 m (213 ft), he discovered that one of the shafts was blocked by a limestone "door" with two eroded copper "handles". The National Geographic Society created a similar robot, which, in September 2002, drilled a small hole in the southern door only to find another stone slab behind it. The northern passage, which was difficult to navigate because of its twists and turns, was also found to be blocked by a slab.

Research continued in 2011 with the Djedi Project, which used a fibre-optic "micro snake camera" that could see around corners. With this, they were able to penetrate the first door of the southern shaft through the hole drilled in 2002, and view all the sides of the small chamber behind it. They discovered hieroglyphic characters written in red paint. Egyptian mathematics researcher Luca Miatello stated that the markings read "121" – the length of the shaft in cubits. The Djedi team were also able to scrutinize the inside of the two copper "handles" embedded in the door, which they now believe to be for decorative purposes. They additionally found the reverse side of the "door" to be finished and polished, which suggests that it was not put there just to block the shaft from debris, but rather for a more specific reason.

=== Grand Gallery ===
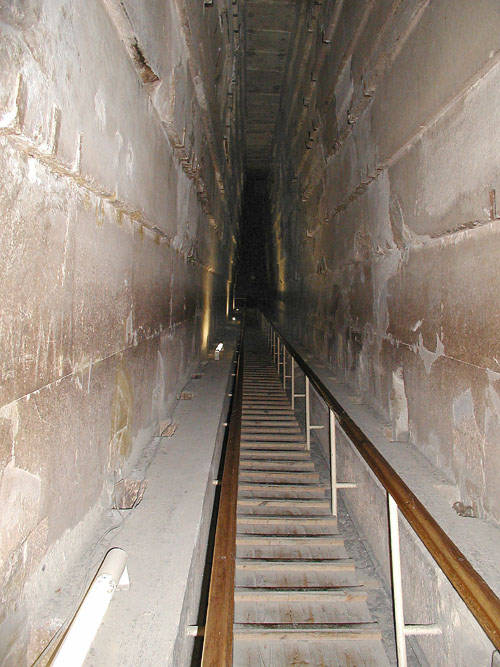
Grand Gallery (with modern walkway up the middle)

The Grand Gallery continues the slope of the Ascending Passage towards the King's Chamber, extending from the 23rd to the 48th course (of stones), a rise of 21 metres (69 ft). It has been praised as a "truly spectacular example of stonemasonry". It is 8.6 metres (28 ft) high and 46.68 metres (153.1 ft) long. Its walls are made out of polished limestone. The base is 4 cubits (2.1 m; 6.9 ft) wide, but after two courses – at a height of 2.29 metres (7.5 ft) – the blocks of stone in the walls are corbelled inwards by 6–10 centimetres (2.4–3.9 in) on each side.

There are seven of these steps, so, at the top, the Grand Gallery is only 2 cubits (1.0 m; 3.4 ft) wide. It is roofed by slabs of stone laid at a slightly steeper angle than the floor so that each stone fits into a slot cut into the top of the gallery, like the teeth of a ratchet. The purpose was to have each block supported by the wall of the Gallery, rather than resting on the block beneath it, in order to prevent cumulative pressure.

At the upper end of the Gallery, on the eastern wall, is a hole near the roof that opens into a short tunnel by which access can be gained to the lowest of the relieving chambers.

The floor of the Grand Gallery has a shelf or step on either side, 1 cubit (52.4 cm; 20.6 in) wide, leaving a lower ramp 2 cubits (1.0 m; 3.4 ft) wide between them. There are 56 slots on the shelves, with 28 on each side. On each wall, 25 niches have been cut above the slots. The purpose of these slots is not known, but the central gutter in the floor of the Gallery, which is the same width as the Ascending Passage, has led to speculation that the blocking stones were stored in the Grand Gallery and the slots held wooden beams to restrain them from sliding down the passage. Jean-Pierre Houdin theorized that they held a timber frame that was used in combination with a trolley to pull the heavy granite blocks up the pyramid.

At the top of the gallery, there is a step onto a small horizontal platform where a tunnel leads through the Antechamber, once blocked by portcullis stones, into the King's Chamber.

=== The Big Void ===
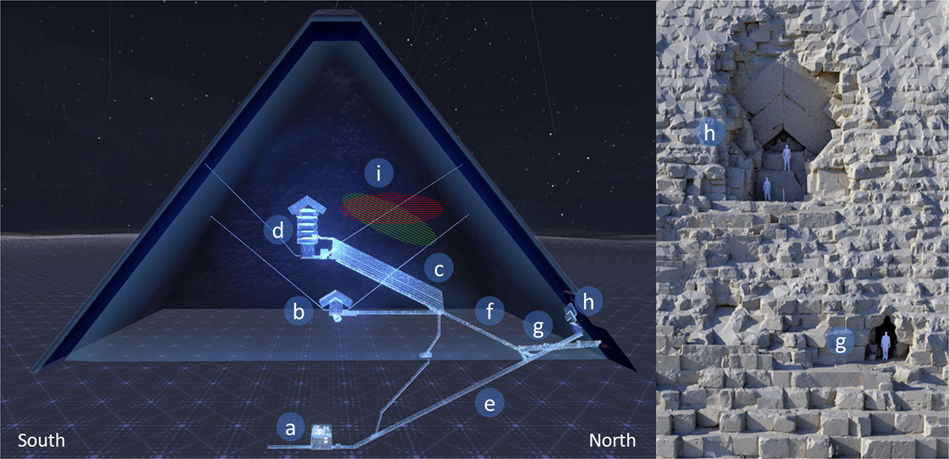
East-West cut view of the Great Pyramid and front view of the North Face Chevron Area. a. Subterranean Chamber, b. Queen's Chamber, c. Grand Gallery, d. King's Chamber, e. Descending Corridor, f. Ascending Corridor, g. al-Ma'mun Corridor, h. North Face Chevron Area, i. ScanPyramids Big Void with horizontal hypothesis (red hatching) and inclined hypothesis (green hatching), as published in November 2017.

In 2017, scientists from the ScanPyramids project discovered a large cavity above the Grand Gallery using muon radiography, which they called the "ScanPyramids Big Void". A research team, under the supervision of Professor Morishima Kunihiro at Nagoya University, used special nuclear emulsion detectors. Its length is at least 30 metres (98 ft) and its cross-section is similar to that of the Grand Gallery. Its existence was confirmed by independent detection with three different technologies: nuclear emulsion films, scintillator hodoscopes, and gas detectors. The purpose of the cavity is unknown and it is not accessible. Zahi Hawass speculates it may have been a gap used in the construction of the Grand Gallery, but the Japanese research team state that the void is completely different from previously identified construction spaces.

To verify and pinpoint the void, a team from Kyushu University, Tohoku University, the University of Tokyo and the Chiba Institute of Technology planned to rescan the structure with a newly developed muon detector in 2020. Their work was delayed by the COVID-19 pandemic.

=== Antechamber ===
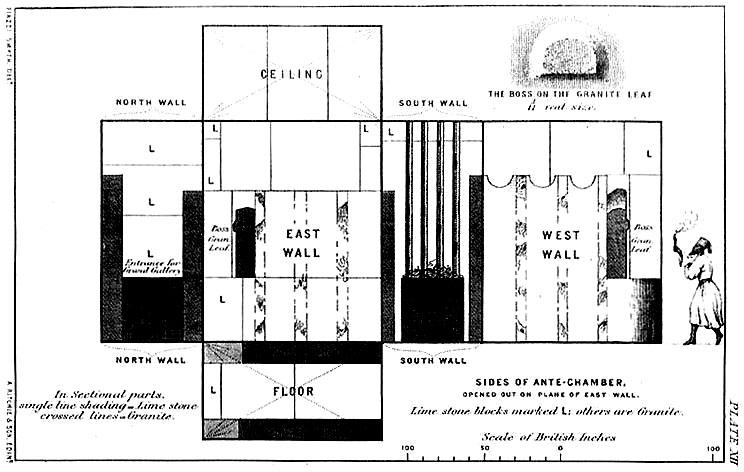
A diagram of the Antechamber

The last line of defence against intrusion was a small chamber designed to house portcullis blocking stones, called the Antechamber. It is cased almost entirely in granite and is situated between the upper end of the Grand Gallery and the King's Chamber. Three slots for portcullis stones line the east and west wall of the chamber. Each of them is topped with a semi-circular groove for a log, around which ropes could be spanned.

The granite portcullis stones were approximately 1 cubit (52.4 cm; 20.6 in) thick and were lowered into position by ropes, which were tied through four holes at the top of the blocks. A corresponding set of four vertical grooves are on the south wall of the chamber, recesses that make space for the ropes.

The Antechamber has a design flaw: the space above them can be accessed, thus all but the last block can be circumvented. This was exploited by looters who punched a hole through the ceiling of the tunnel behind, gaining access to the King's Chamber. Later on, all three portcullis stones were broken and removed. Fragments of these blocks can be found in various locations in the pyramid (the Pit Shaft, the Original Entrance, the Grotto and the recess before the Subterranean Chamber).

=== King's Chamber ===
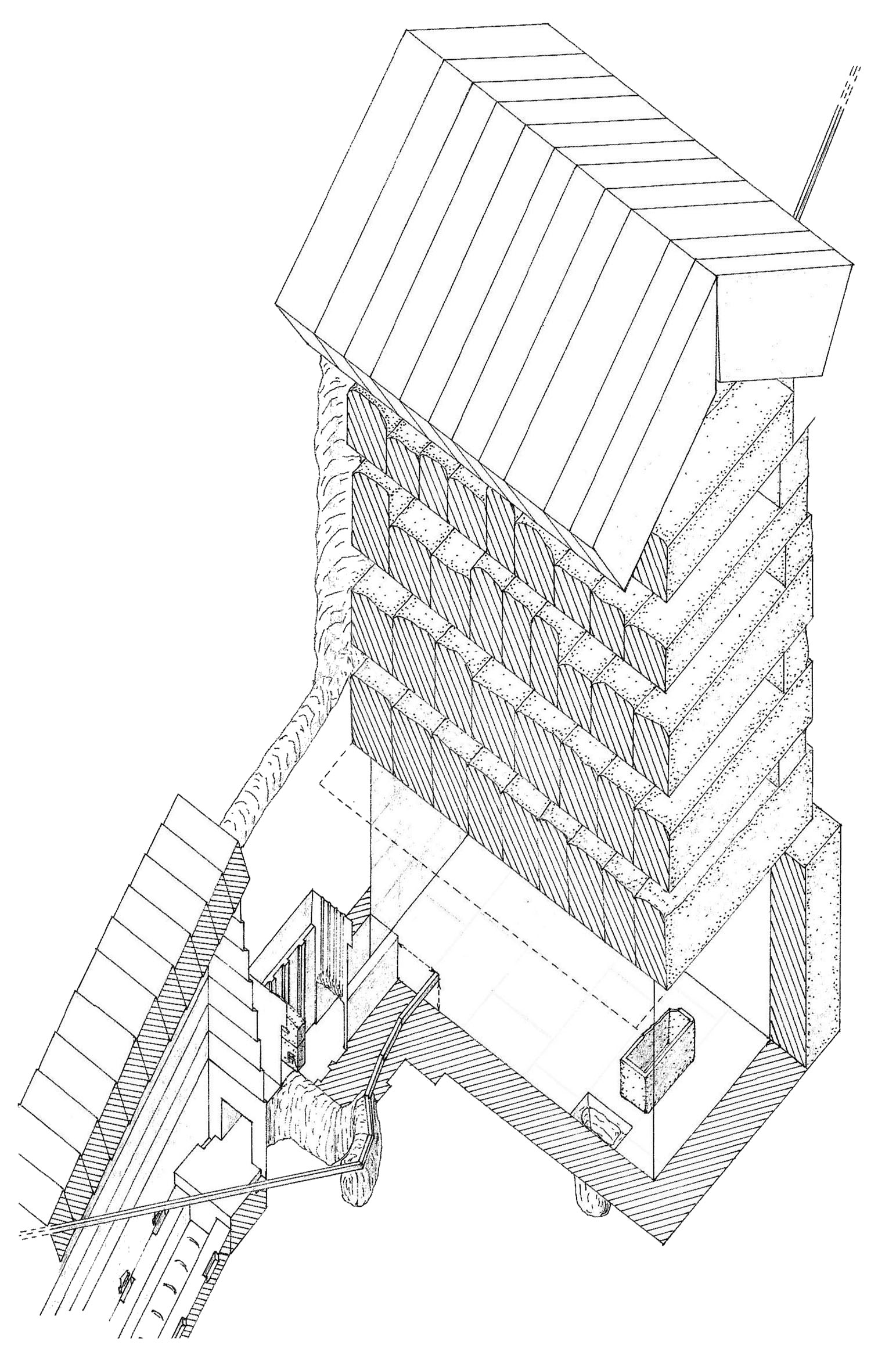
Axonometric view of the King's Chamber

The King's Chamber is the upmost of the three main chambers of the pyramid. It is faced entirely with granite and measures 20 cubits (10.5 m; 34.4 ft) east-west by 10 cubits (5.2 m; 17.2 ft) north-south. Its flat ceiling is about 11 cubits and 5 digits (5.8 m;19.0 ft) above the floor, formed by nine slabs of stone weighing in total about 400 tons. All the roof beams show cracks due to the chamber having settled 2.5–5 cm (0.98–1.97 in).

The walls consist of five courses of blocks that are uninscribed, as was the norm for burial chambers of the 4th dynasty. The stones are precisely fitted together. The facing surfaces are dressed to varying degrees, with some displaying remains of lifting bosses not entirely cut away. The back sides of the blocks were only roughly hewn to shape, as was usual with Egyptian hard-stone facade blocks, presumably to save work.

==== Sarcophagus ====
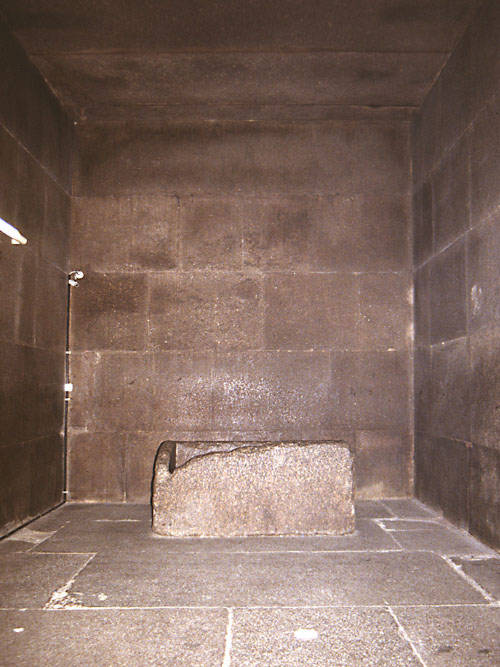
Sarcophagus in the King's Chamber

The only surviving object in the King's Chamber is a sarcophagus made of a single, hollowed-out granite block. When it was rediscovered in the Early Middle Ages, it was found broken open and any contents had already been removed. It is of the form common for early Egyptian sarcophagi, rectangular in shape with grooves to slide the now missing lid into place with three small holes for pegs to fix it. The coffer was not perfectly smoothed, displaying tool marks matching those of copper saws and tubular hand-drills.

The internal dimensions of the sarcophagus are roughly 198 cm (6.50 ft) by 68 cm (2.23 feet), the external 228 cm (7.48 ft) by 98 cm (3.22 ft), with a height of 105 cm (3.44 ft). The walls have a thickness of about 15 cm (0.49 ft). The sarcophagus is too large to fit around the corner between the Ascending and Descending Passages, which indicates that it must have been placed in the chamber before the roof was put in place.

==== Air shafts ====
In the north and south walls of the King's Chamber are two narrow shafts, commonly known as "air shafts". They face each other and are located approximately 0.91 m (3.0 ft) above the floor, 2.5 m (8.2 ft) from the eastern wall, with a width of 18 and 21 cm (7.1 and 8.3 in) and a height of 14 cm (5.5 in). Both start out horizontally for the length of the granite blocks they go through before changing to an upwards direction.

The southern shaft ascends at an angle of 45° with a slight curve westwards. One ceiling stone was found to be distinctly unfinished, which Gantenbrink called a "Monday morning block". The northern shaft changes angle several times, shifting the path to the west, perhaps to avoid the Big Void. The builders apparently had trouble calculating the right angles, resulting in parts of the shaft being narrower. Now, they both commute to the exterior. Whether they originally penetrated the outer casing is unknown.

The purpose of these shafts is not clear: they were long believed by Egyptologists to be shafts for ventilation, but this idea has now been widely abandoned in favour of the shafts serving a ritualistic purpose associated with the ascension of the king's spirit to the heavens.

The idea that the shafts point towards stars or areas of the northern and southern skies has been largely dismissed as the northern shaft follows a dog-leg course through the masonry and the southern shaft has a bend of approximately 20 centimetres (7.9 in), indicating no intention to have them point to any celestial objects.

In 1992, as part of the Upuaut project, a ventilation system was installed in both air shafts of the King's Chamber.

=== Relieving chambers ===
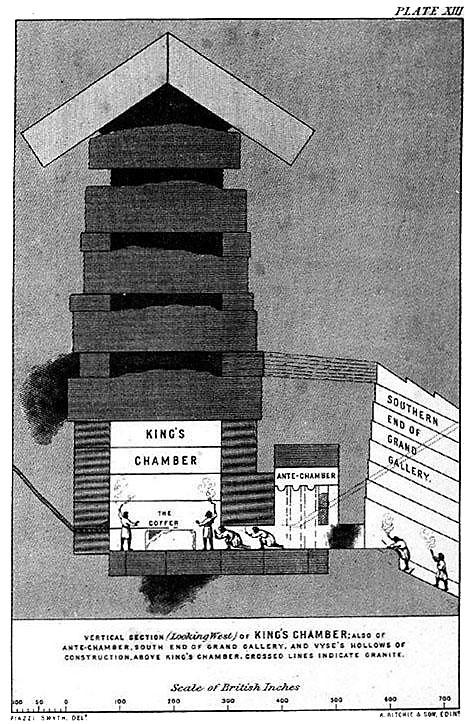
Relieving chambers above the King's Chamber, Smyth 1877

Above the roof of the King's Chamber are five compartments, named (from lowest upwards) "Davison's Chamber", "Wellington's Chamber", "Nelson's Chamber", "Lady Arbuthnot's Chamber", and "Campbell's Chamber".

They were presumably intended to safeguard the King's Chamber from the possibility of the roof collapsing under the weight of stone above, hence they are referred to as "relieving chambers".

The granite blocks that divide the chambers have flat bottom sides but roughly shaped top sides, giving all five chambers an irregular floor, but a flat ceiling, with the exception of the uppermost chamber, which has a pointed limestone roof.

Nathaniel Davison is credited with the discovery of the lowest of these chambers in 1763, although a French merchant named Maynard informed him of its existence. It can be reached through an ancient passage that originates from the top of the south wall of the Grand Gallery. The upper four chambers were discovered in 1837 by Howard Vyse after discovering a crack in the ceiling of the first chamber. This allowed the insertion of a long reed, which, with the employment of gunpowder and boring rods, opened a tunnel upwards through the masonry. As no access shafts existed for the upper four chambers – unlike Davison's Chamber – they were completely inaccessible until this point.

==== Inscriptions ====
The walls of the upper four relieving chambers are inscribed with numerous graffiti of red ochre paint.

The hieroglyphic inscriptions spell out the names of work-gangs, such as Khufu-excites-love. The blocks were inscribed before being laid, which led to some of the inscriptions being partially covered by other blocks, and oriented sideways or upside down. Similar graffiti were found on blocks of other Egyptian pyramids, like that of Menkaure and Sahure.

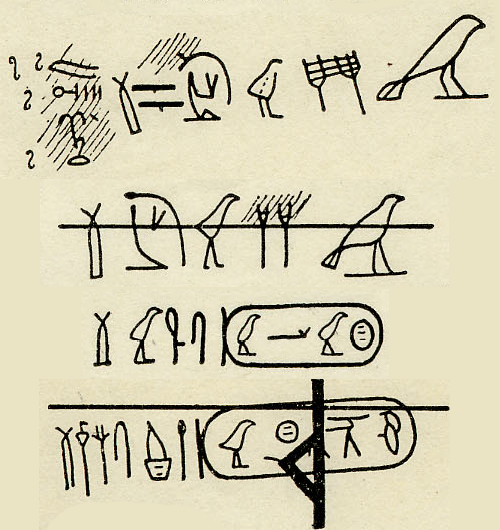
The names of the four work-gangs, inscribed on the walls of the relieving chambers

The inscriptions were deciphered correctly only decades after discovery and reference four work-gangs:

- "The gang, The Horus Medjedu-is-the-purifier-of-the-two-lands" (Medjedu is Khufu's Horus name)
  - Found once in relieving chamber 3
- "The gang, The Horus Medjedu-is-pure"
  - Found seven times in chamber 4
- "The gang, Khufu-excites-love"
  - Found once in chamber 5 (top chamber)
- "The gang, The-white-crown-of Khnumkhufu-is-powerful" (Khnum-Khufu is Khufu's full birth name)
  - Found once in chambers 2 and 3, ten times in chamber 4 and twice in chamber 5

A 3D survey conducted in 2024 revealed previously unknown graffiti. The west wall of Nelson's Chamber was found to be inscribed with a date in “the year of the 6th census, second month of the Peret season, day […]” (the census was conducted biannually during Khufu's reign). A mention of the goddess Wadjet, which might have been part of a work-gang name, was also discovered on the same wall.

Leveling lines and indication marks for masons, made during construction, are also found throughout the relieving chambers.

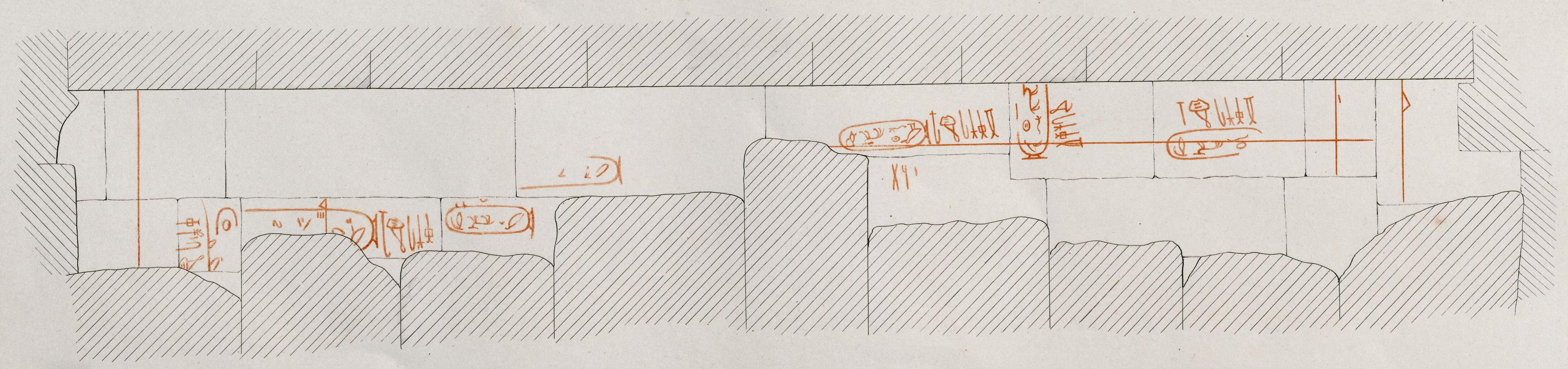
North wall of Lady Arbuthnot's Chamber, inscribed with several cartouches of Khufu, as well as leveling lines

== Pyramid complex ==
The Great Pyramid is surrounded by a complex of several buildings, including small pyramids.

=== Temples and causeway ===
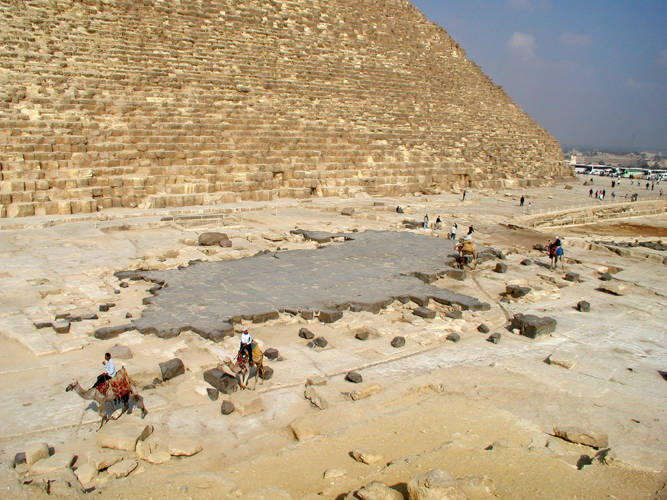
Remains of the basalt floor of the temple at the east foot of the pyramid

The Pyramid Temple, which stood on the east side of the pyramid and measured 52.2 metres (171 ft) north to south and 40 metres (130 ft) east to west, has almost entirely disappeared. Only some of the black basalt paving remains. There are only a few remnants of the causeway that linked the pyramid with the valley and the Valley Temple. The Valley Temple is buried beneath the village of Nazlet el-Samman; basalt paving and limestone walls have been found but the site has not been excavated.

=== East cemetery ===
The tomb of Queen Hetepheres I, sister-wife of Sneferu and mother of Khufu, lies 110 metres (360 ft) east of the Great Pyramid. Discovered by accident by the Reisner expedition, the burial was intact, but the carefully sealed coffin proved to be empty.

==== Subsidiary pyramids ====
On the southern end of the east side are four subsidiary pyramids. The three that remain standing to almost full height are popularly known as the Queens' Pyramids (G1-a, G1-b and G1-c). The fourth, smaller satellite pyramid (G1-d), is so ruined that its existence was not suspected until the first course of stones and, later, the remains of the capstone were discovered during excavations in 1991–1993.

=== Boats ===
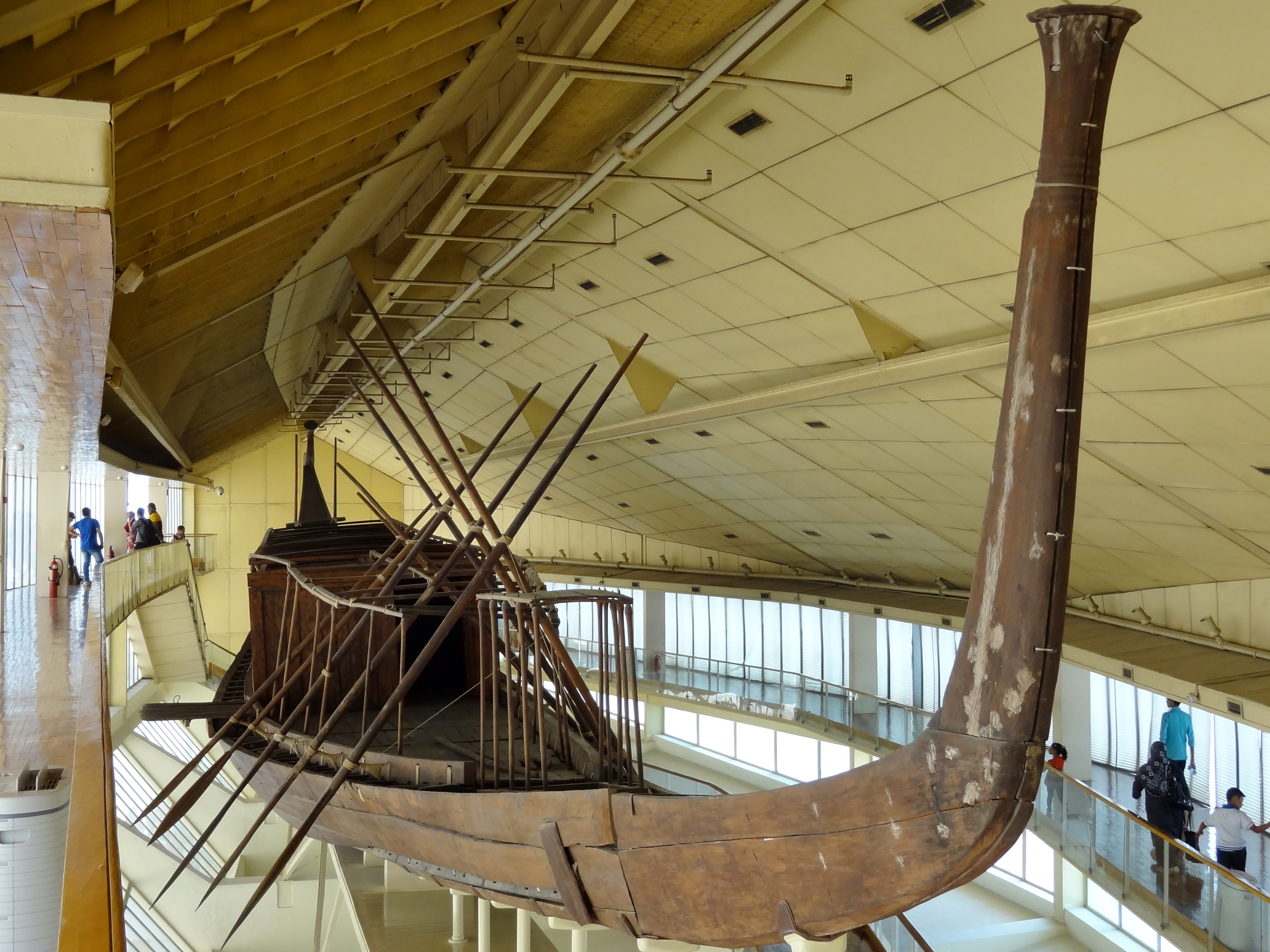
A restored Khufu ship was once displayed at the Giza Solar boat museum and is now relocated to the Grand Egyptian Museum.

Three boat-shaped pits are located east of the pyramid. They are large enough in size and shape to have held complete boats, though so shallow that any superstructure, if there ever was one, must have been removed or disassembled.

Two additional boat pits, long and rectangular in shape, were found south of the pyramid, still covered with slabs of stone weighing up to 15 tons.

The first of these was discovered in May 1954 by the Egyptian archaeologist Kamal el-Mallakh. Inside were 1,224 pieces of wood, the longest 23 metres (75 ft) in length, the shortest 10 centimetres (0.33 ft). These were entrusted to a boat builder, Haj Ahmed Yusuf, who worked out how the pieces fitted together. The entire process, including conservation and straightening of the warped wood, took fourteen years. The result is a cedar-wood boat 43.6 metres (143 ft) long, its timbers held together by ropes, which was originally housed in the Giza Solar boat museum, a special boat-shaped, air-conditioned museum beside the pyramid. The boat is now in the Grand Egyptian Museum.

During construction of this museum in the 1980s, the second sealed boat pit was discovered. It was left unopened until 2011 when excavation began on the boat.

=== Pyramid town ===
Flanking the Giza pyramid complex is a cyclopean stone wall, the Wall of the Crow. Mark Lehner discovered a worker's town outside the wall, otherwise known as "The Lost City", dated by pottery styles, seal impressions and stratigraphy to have been constructed and occupied during the reigns of Khafre (2520–2494 BC) and Menkaure (2490–2472 BC). In the early 21st century, Lehner and his team made several discoveries, including what appears to have been a thriving port, suggesting the town and associated living quarters, which consisted of barracks called "galleries", may not have been for the pyramid workers after all, but rather for the soldiers and sailors who used the port. In light of this new discovery, as to where then the pyramid workers may have lived, Lehner suggested the alternative possibility they may have camped on the ramps he believes were used to construct the pyramids, or possibly at nearby quarries.

In the early 1970s, the Austrian archaeologist Karl Kromer excavated a mound in the South Field of the plateau. It contained artefacts including mudbrick seals of Khufu, which Kromer identified with an artisans' settlement. Mudbrick buildings just south of Khufu's Valley Temple contained mud sealings of Khufu and have been suggested to be a settlement serving the cult of Khufu after his death. A worker's cemetery used at least between Khufu's reign and the end of the Fifth Dynasty was discovered south of the Wall of the Crow by Hawass in 1990.

== Looting ==
Authors Bob Brier and Hoyt Hobbs claim that "all the pyramids were robbed" by the New Kingdom, when the construction of royal tombs in the Valley of the Kings began. Joyce Tyldesley states that the Great Pyramid itself was likely robbed as early as the First Intermediate Period, given that the evidence indicates that the Great Pyramid had been "known to have been opened and emptied by the Middle Kingdom", before the Arab caliph Al-Ma'mun entered the pyramid around 820 AD.

I. E. S. Edwards discusses Strabo's mention that the pyramid "a little way up one side has a stone that may be taken out, which being raised up there is a sloping passage to the foundations". Edwards suggested that the pyramid was entered by tomb robbers after the end of the Old Kingdom and sealed and then reopened more than once until Strabo's door was added. He adds: "If this highly speculative surmise be correct, it is also necessary to assume either that the existence of the door was forgotten or that the entrance was again blocked with facing stones", in order to explain why al-Ma'mun could not find the entrance. Scholars such as Gaston Maspero and Flinders Petrie have noted that evidence for a similar door has been found at the Bent Pyramid of Dashur.

Herodotus visited Egypt in the 5th century BC and recounts a story that he was told concerning vaults under the pyramid built on an island where the body of Khufu lies. Edwards notes that the pyramid had "almost certainly been opened and its contents plundered long before the time of Herodotus" and that it might have been closed again during the Twenty-sixth Dynasty of Egypt when other monuments were restored. He suggests that the story told to Herodotus could have been the result of almost two centuries of telling and retelling by pyramid guides.

== See also ==
- Ancient Egypt in mathematics and architecture
- List of Egyptian pyramids
- List of largest monoliths, including a section on calculating the weight of megaliths
- List of tallest freestanding structures
- List of tallest structures built before the 20th century
- Pyramidology

== Notes ==
Records
Preceded by Red Pyramid	World's tallest structure ever built c. 2600 BC − c. 516 AD; 146.6 m	Succeeded by Yongning Pagoda (disputed)
Preceded by Yongning Pagoda (disputed)	World's tallest existing structure 532-1221	Succeeded by Old St Paul's Cathedral
Preceded by Red Pyramid	Tallest structure in Egypt c. 2600 BC − 1961	Succeeded by Cairo Tower
