= St. John Street, Katowice =

Street in Katowice, Poland

St. John Street
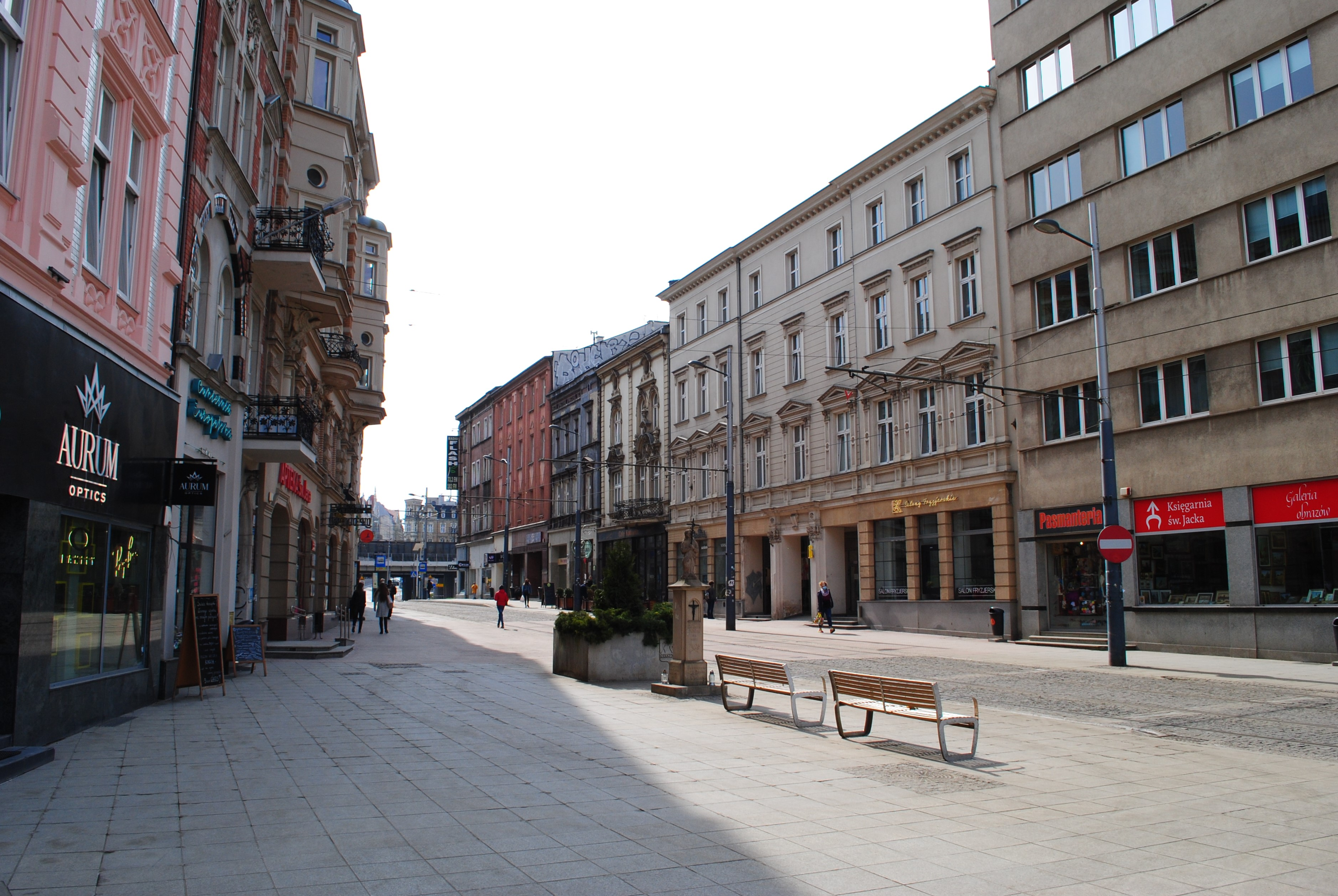
- St. John Street in March 2021
- Interactive map of St. John Street
- Native name: Ulica św. Jana (Polish)
- Part of: Śródmieście
- Length: 255 m (837 ft)
- Location: Katowice
- Coordinates: 50°15′29.25″N 19°01′17.85″E

St. John Street in Katowice is a street in the Śródmieście district. It begins at the Market Square, intersects with Staromiejska Street and Dworcowa Street, and ends after a railway viaduct at the junction with Tadeusz Kościuszko Street, Jan Kochanowski Street, and Wojewódzka Street.

== History ==
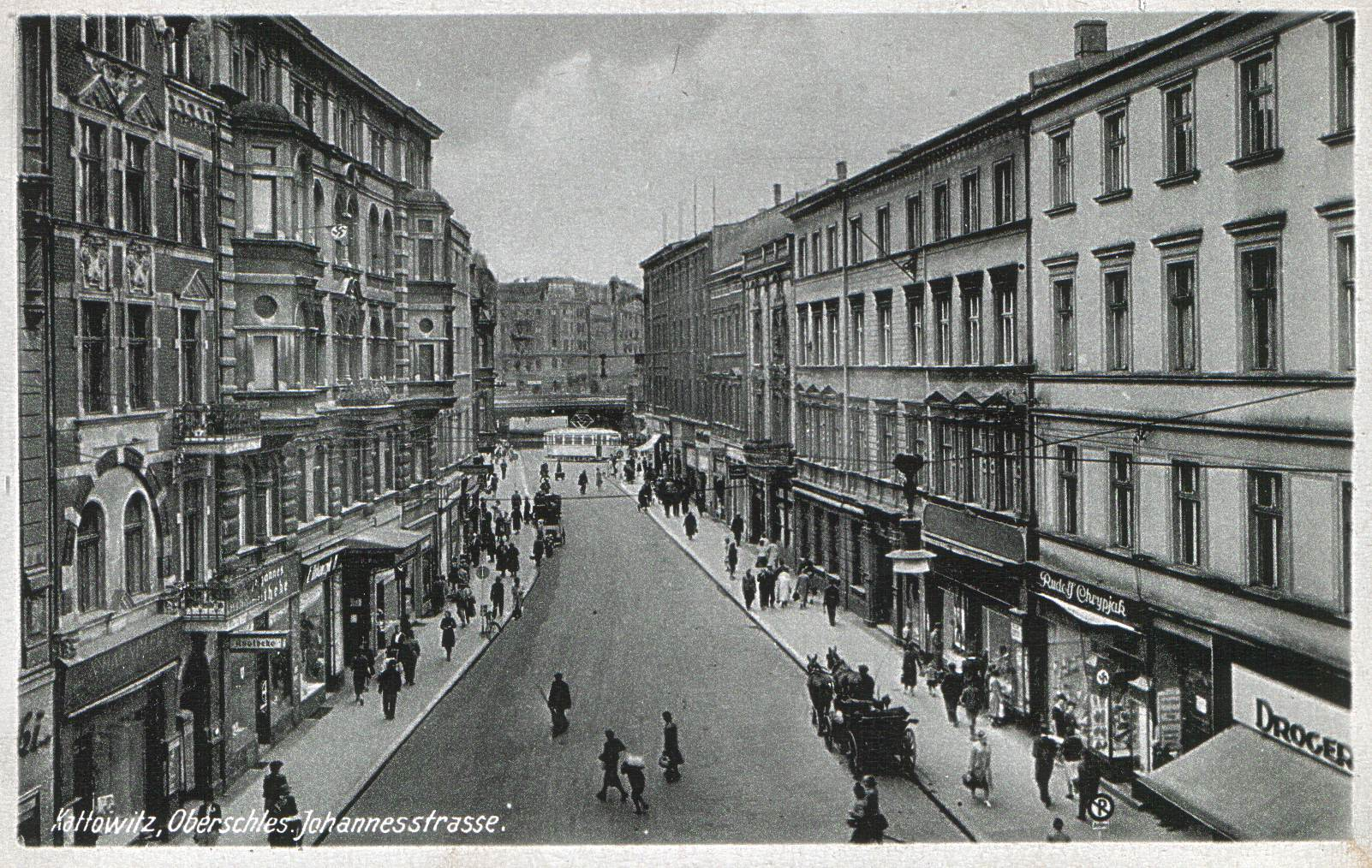
St. John Street on a postcard from the 1940s

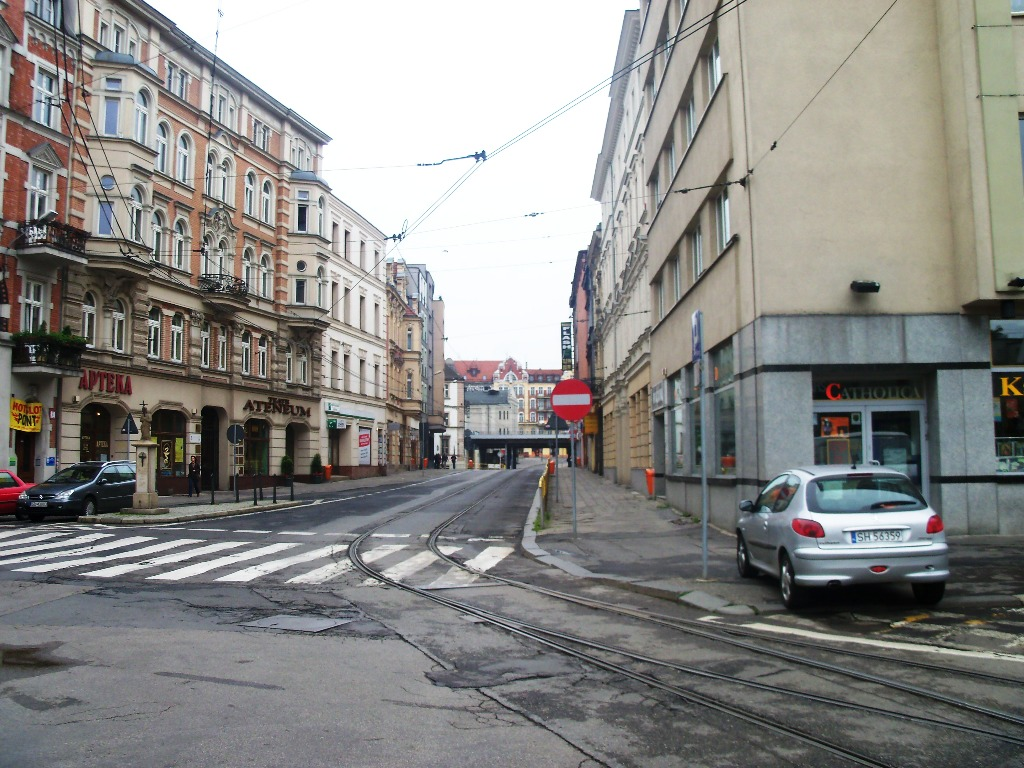
St. John Street looking south (before modernization)

In the second half of the 16th century, near the former forge pond at the corner of the present-day Market Square and St. John Street, a local communication hub connected routes in four directions: southeast to Mikołów (now Młyńska Street and Mikołowska Street), south to Brynów (now St. John Street, Jan Kochanowski Street, and Wit Stwosz Street), east to Szopienice and Mysłowice (Warszawska Street), and north to the northern part of Bogucice (near the church, along Katowicka Street) and further to Dąbrówka Mała.

The street's name derives from a statue of St. John, erected along the road and consecrated on 11 July 1816. In 1875, the statue was expanded and relocated to a private property in Brynów. In 1999, a replica of the statue, crafted by Mirosław and Jacek Kiciński, was placed at the street's entrance to the Market Square.

In the 1860s, Katowice's first sewers were constructed to drain waste from manor buildings. These ran, among others, from the intersection of Querstraße (now Staromiejska Street) and Johanesstraße (now St. John Street), alongside Pocztowa Street, into the forge pond of Marta Smelter (formed from a Rawa river spill, now nonexistent). In the 1870s, an extension of the street included a railway crossing, insufficient for the growing traffic toward the city's exit routes. In 1882, a grade-separated railway viaduct was completed over St. John Street.

In 1912, the Rialto Cinema Theatre was built at the street (constructed by Martin Tichauer). During the interwar period, an office of the Port insurance company operated at number 12, and a men's clothing store by Gruenpeter was located at number 11. During the German Empire (until 1922) and the German occupation, the street was named Johannesstraße. During the Polish People's Republic, it was named 15 Grudnia Street, commemorating the founding of the Polish United Workers' Party. Fires set by Soviet troops in 1945 destroyed parts of the city center between St. John Street and Pocztowa Street. Around the mid-1950s, a late-socialist-realist building was constructed, closing the block between Pocztowa Street and St. John Street, forming the southern frontage of the new market square. On 28 February 1990, the Katowice City Council restored the name St. John Street.

On 20 August 2010, a brass memorial plaque honoring Henryk Sławik, a Righteous Among the Nations, Silesian Uprising participant, and rescuer of Jews during World War II, was unveiled on the facade of a tenement at the corner of Market Square and St. John Street. The tenement stands where Sławik lived from 1928 to 1939. Plans were made to relocate tram tracks from Pocztowa Street to St. John Street.

As part of the redevelopment of Katowice railway station, the transport hub around Pocztowa, Dworcowa, and St. John streets was reconstructed. Construction began on 3 March 2012. The hub was opened in 2013. Tram tracks on Pocztowa Street were removed, and two tracks were laid along St. John Street.

== Description ==
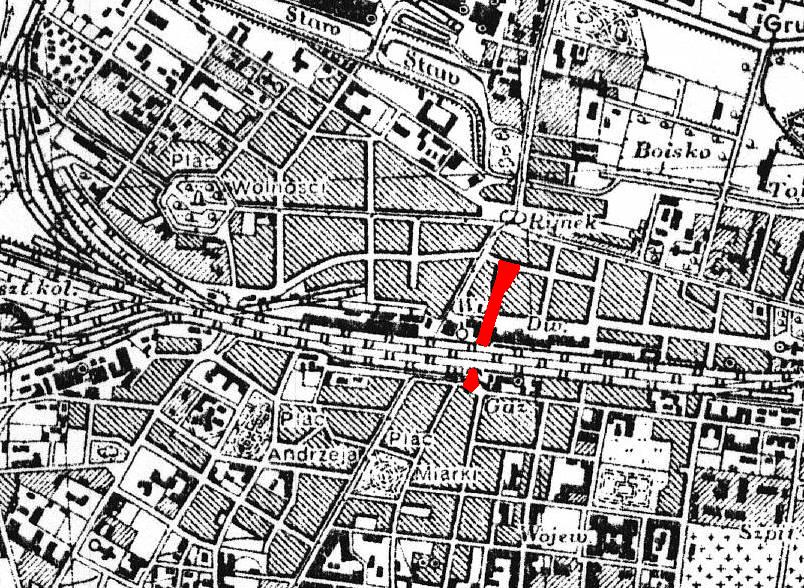
St. John Street, marked in red, on a 1933 Military Geographical Institute map

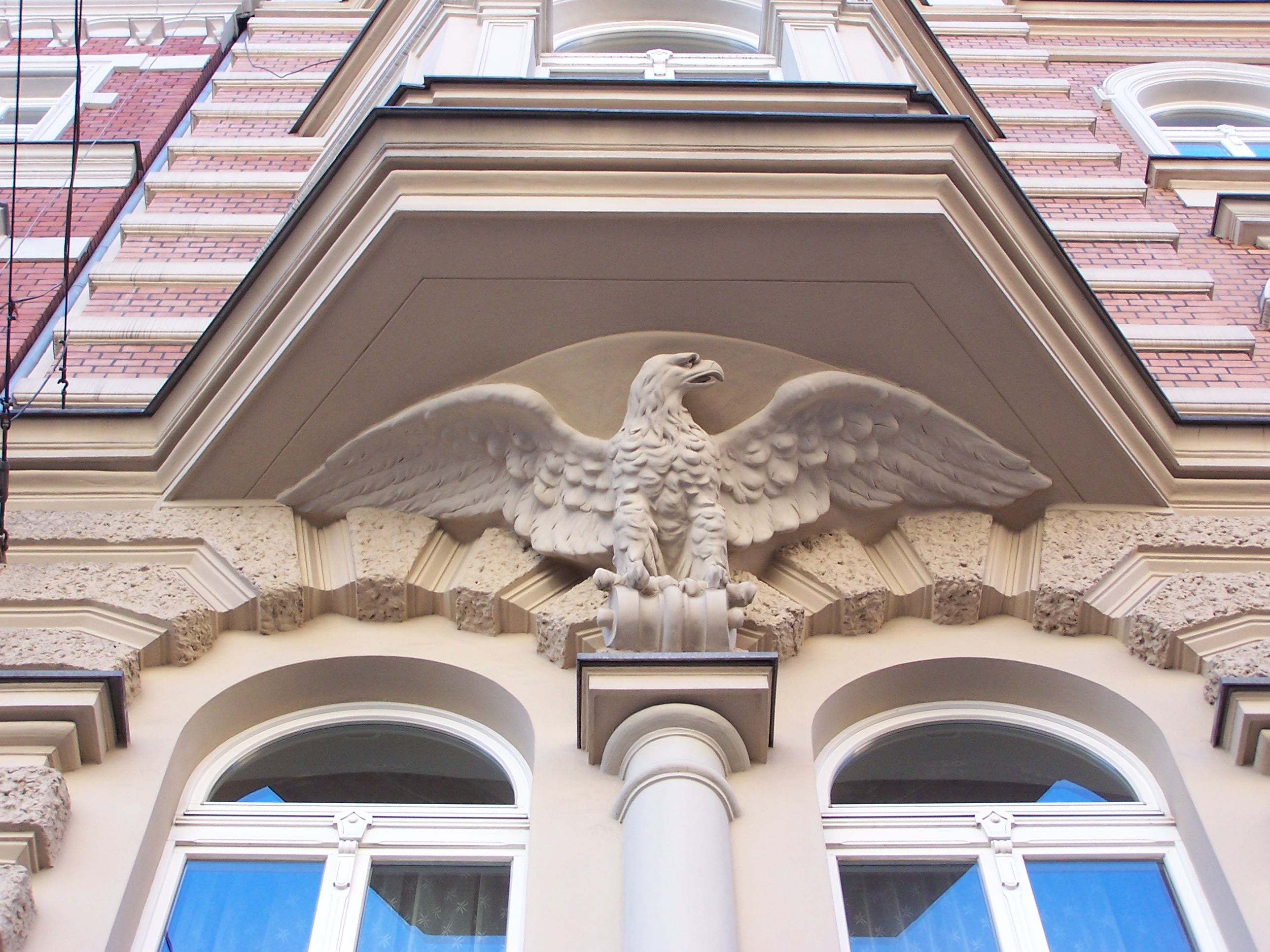
Architectural detail in the shape of an eagle on a tenement at St. John Street

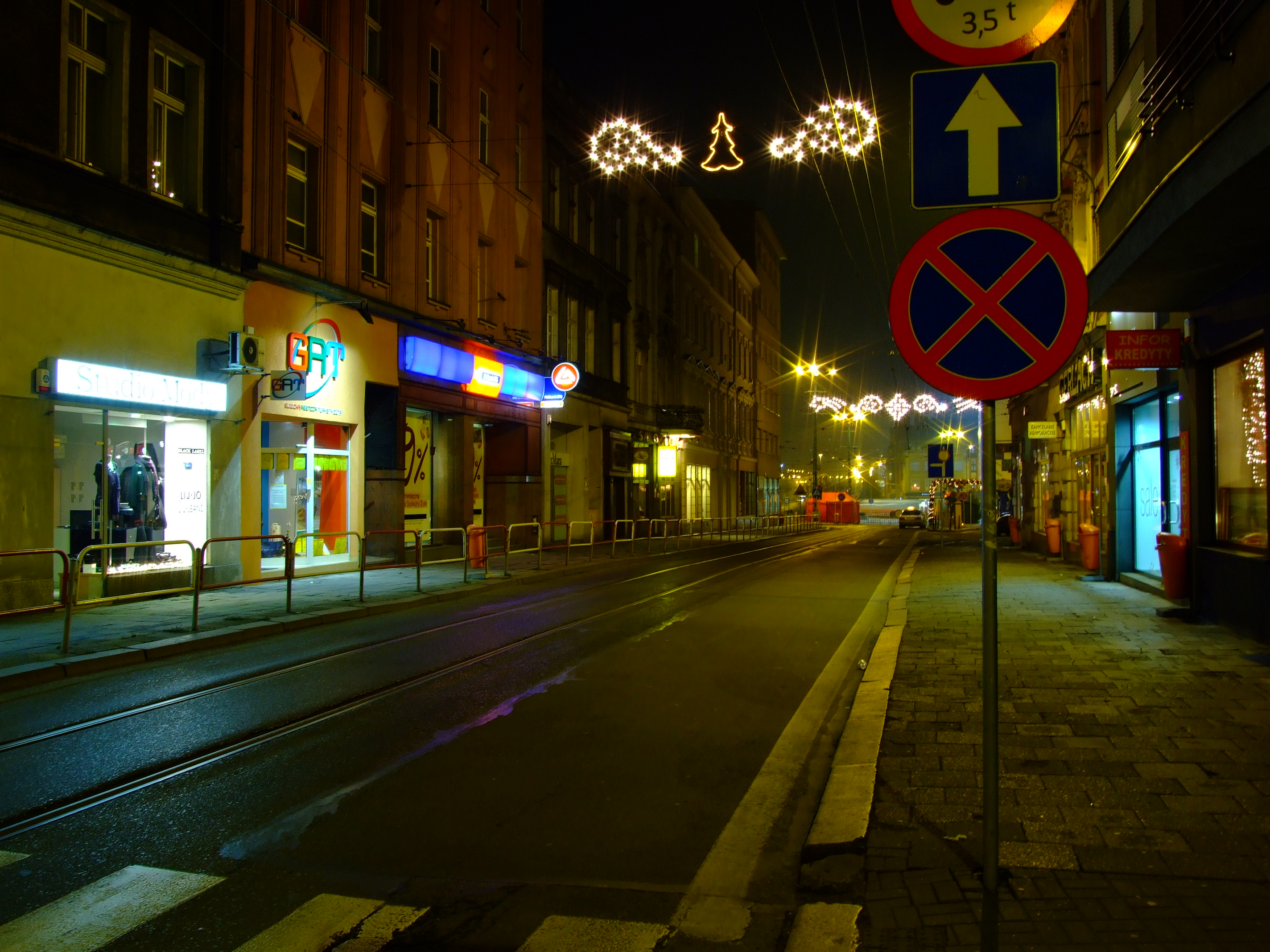
St. John Street at night (2008)

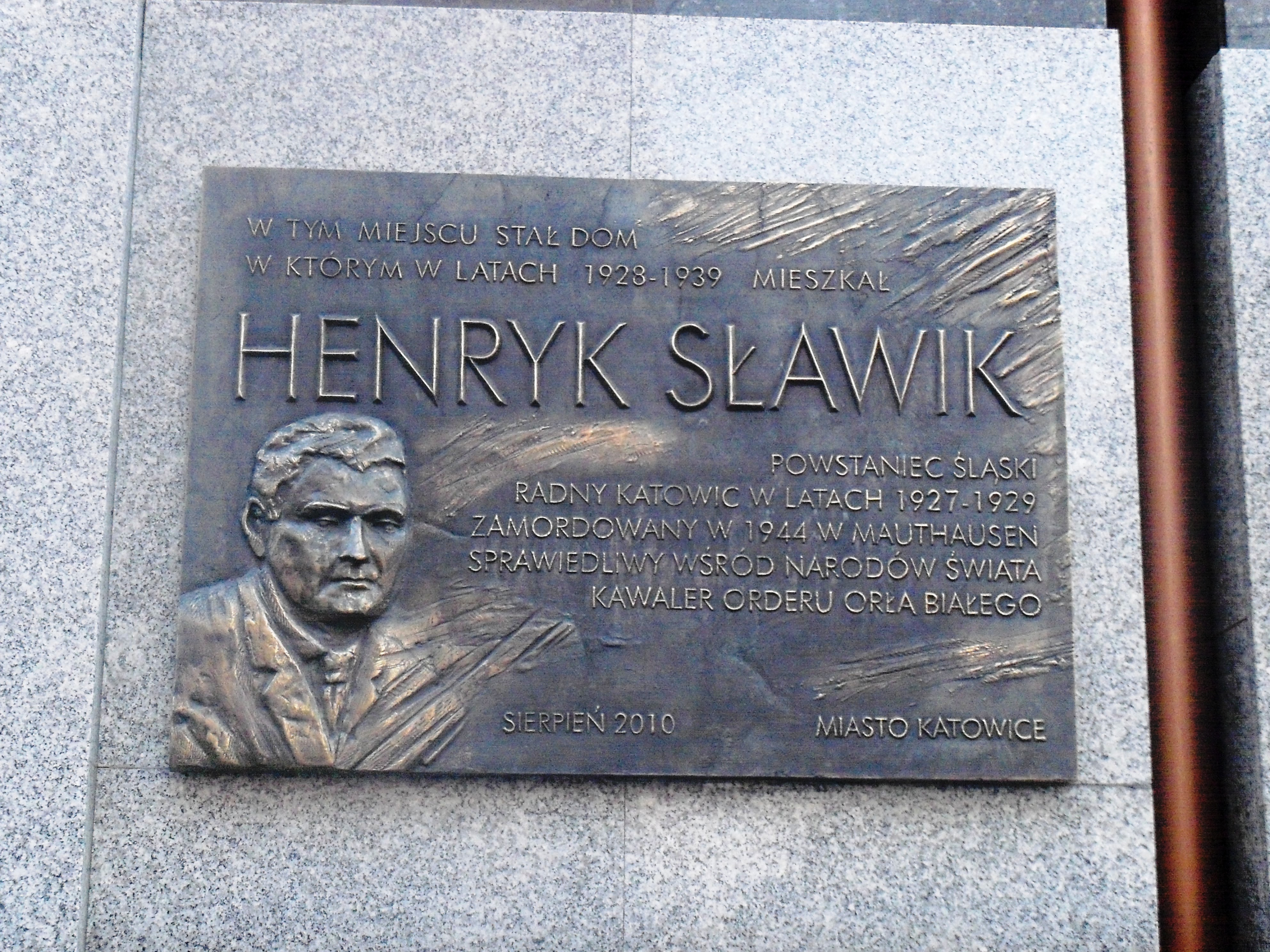
Memorial plaque on the facade of a building at St. John Street, dedicated to Henryk Sławik

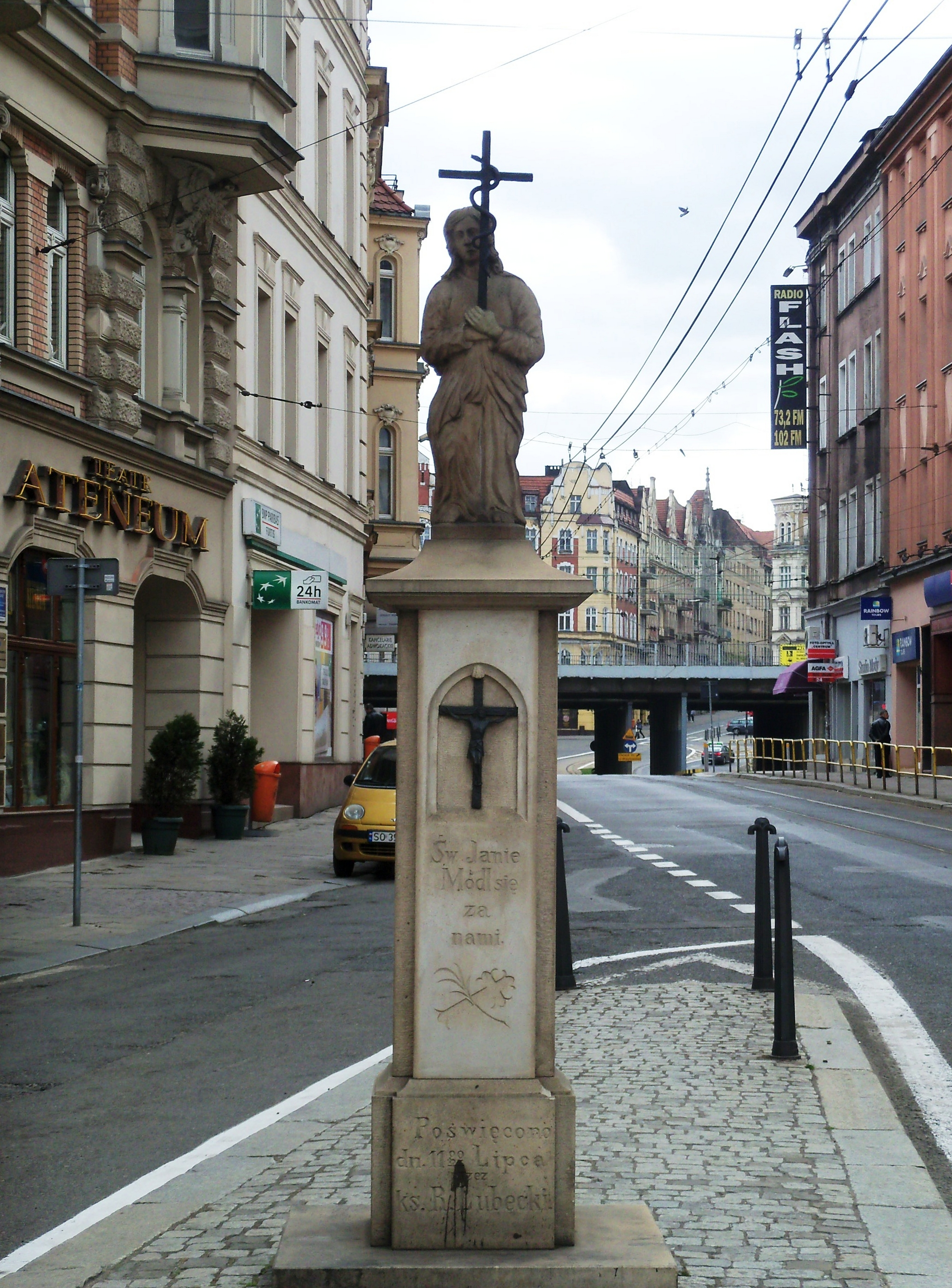
Replica of the St. John statue at the street named after him

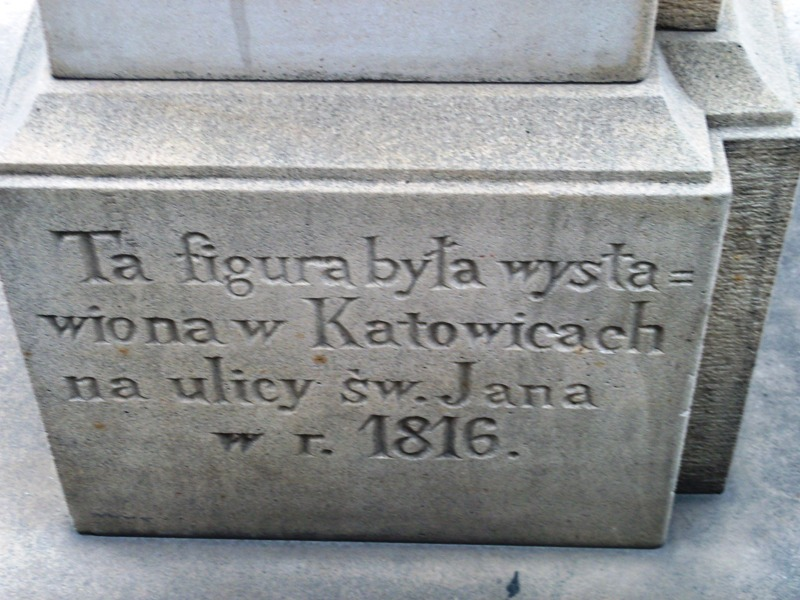
Inscription under the St. John statue

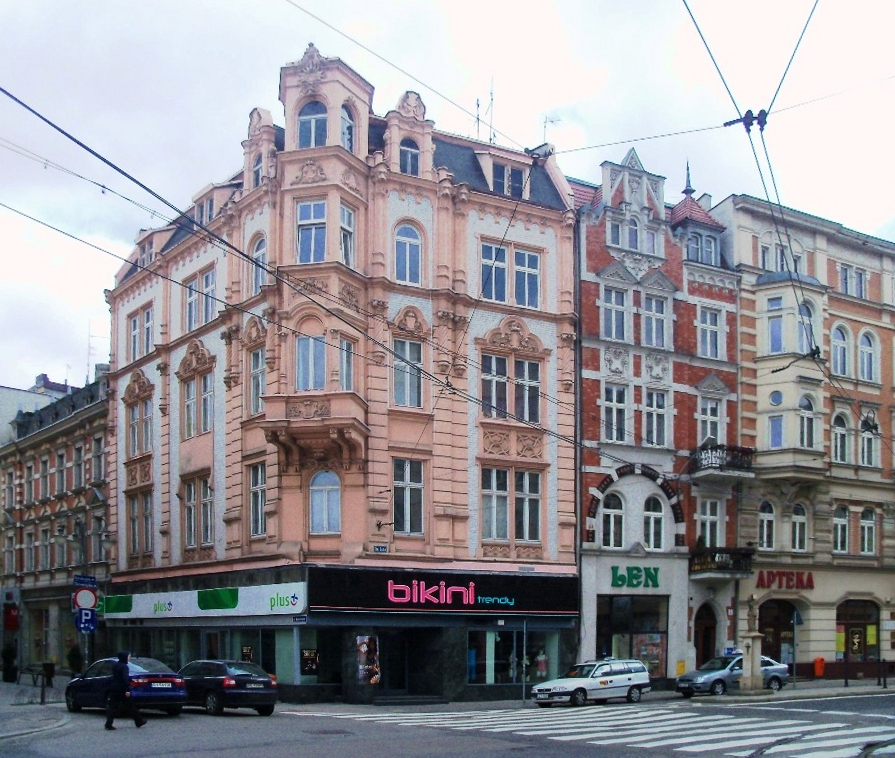
Corner tenement (6 St. John Street, at the intersection with 1 Staromiejska Street)

The following historic structures are located along St. John Street:

- A tenement (5 St. John Street) was built in 1875 by builder Brinsy and renovated in 1924 (with an added first floor and modified architectural details) in a classicist style by B. Żurkowski from Warsaw. In the 1920s, it housed a branch of the Commercial Bank. Constructed in a U-shaped plan, the tenement has three wings and pseudo-avant-corps. The three-story building is fully basemented with a low-pitched gable roof. Its nine-axis plastered facade is crowned by a cornice supported by corbels. The central axis features an entrance portal flanked by double pilasters in the Composite order. The portal's entablature includes a console keystone. The bossaged ground floor has been modified. Upper floors are separated by a cornice. The second floor's window openings are framed with triangular pediments and composite pilasters, except for three central windows with cornice-shaped pediments. Third-floor windows are topped with cornices, while fourth-floor windows have rectangular frames. The interior retains two-flight stairs with terrazzo steps and landings, and a metal balustrade from the 1920s.
- A historic bourgeois tenement (6 St. John Street, at the intersection with 1 Staromiejska Street) was added to the Registry of Cultural Property under no. A/1393/89 on 23 October 1989. Built in the early 20th century, it combines elements of eclecticism, Renaissance Revival, Gothic Revival, and Baroque Revival. The tenement was built on a rectangular plan. Its corner features a bay window, originally topped by a turret (demolished in 1929) supported by atlantes. The facade initially had rich ornamentation. The northern facade is three-axis, the western two-axis, both clad in white glazed brick. The northern facade once had a balcony. Decorations in pediments and under-window panels include anthropomorphic, abstract-geometric, and floral motifs.
- A residential-commercial tenement (7 St. John Street) was built in 1892 by Ignatz Grunfeld in the Baroque Revival style. During the interwar period, it housed a restaurant owned by W. Nowakowski. Constructed on a rectangular plan, the tenement has a compact form. The three-story building, with a basement and attic, is covered by a low-pitched gable roof. Its symmetrical plastered front facade has a modified ground floor. The upper floors are three-axis, divided by three rusticated pilasters. The second floor features a balcony spanning two axes with an original wrought-iron balustrade with Regence ornament. The facade is richly decorated with stucco, including zoomorphic and anthropomorphic motifs in volute pediments. Attic windows are oval. The interior includes utility rooms on the first and second floors, connected by a modern staircase, with apartments on higher floors accessed via a rear staircase. The preserved spiral metal stairs with wooden steps feature an original metal balustrade.
- A tenement (8 St. John Street) was built in 1899, likely by Georg Schalscha's construction company for N. Handler, in an eclectic style with romantic Renaissance Revival and Gothic Revival elements. A residential house from the mid-19th century, expanded in 1865, originally stood on the site. The tenement was built on an L-shaped plan connected to a side wing, with a rear wing enclosing the block. Its compact form is broken by a front avant-corps topped by a triangular gable. The four-story building includes a residential attic and mansard, covered by a gable roof. The front facade has asymmetrical axes, with the entrance portal on the second axis, framed by a full arch. The ground floor has been modified. The upper floors have three axes, clad in brick with plastered architectural details. The tenement features stucco decorations with floral, animal, and anthropomorphic motifs in triangular pediments, under-window panels, and the gable. Windows are framed with profiled moldings. The second and third floors have balconies with original wrought-iron balustrades with floral motifs. The entrance hall's ceiling has rich stucco, and two-flight steel stairs feature a cast iron wrought balustrade.
- A residential-commercial tenement (9 St. John Street) was built in 1874 by Ignatz Grunfeld and renovated in 1930 by Stanisław Łazik (with added rear and side wings). Constructed in the Renaissance Revival style, it aligns with the street's frontage. Plans to redesign the facade in a functionalist style were not realized. In 1945, the Wyzwolenie café, owned by Władysław Pawłowski, opened in the building. Built on a C-shaped plan, the three-story tenement has a three-axis form, with the first axis framed as a pseudo-avant-corps. It is covered by a low-pitched gable roof. The ground floor has been modified. The upper floors have four axes and are plastered, separated by cornices. Decorations are minimal, limited to window frames, simple and triangular pediments, and arabesque reliefs under the second-floor windows and crowning cornice. The original window joinery is fully preserved, while mid-19th-century door joinery is partially retained. The entrance hall lacks decoration. The two-flight wooden stairs feature an original baluster balustrade.
- A tenement (10 St. John Street) was built in 1896 through the renovation of an 1865 house, in the Baroque Revival style. Around 1909, it housed the Friefer hotel, later Residenz (during the interwar period, the Wypoczynek hotel), and in 1945, a chess club of the Youth Organization of the Workers' University Society. During the interwar period, the St. John Pharmacy operated in the building. Constructed on a rectangular plan with two wings semicircularly enclosing the courtyard, the five-story tenement features two-story bay windows on the first and last axes. It is covered by a single-pitched roof. The asymmetrical ground-floor facade has four axes, with a modified passage gate. The upper floors, with nine axes (doubled axes and an emphasized central axis), are symmetrical and clad in brick, with plastered bay windows and details. The first floor's paired axes are separated by bossaged composite pilasters, with outer axes flanked by rustication. A balcony with an original wrought-iron balustrade is located on the central axis of the third floor. Decorations include eagles supporting the bay windows and anthropomorphic motifs in the pediment of the third-floor window on the main axis. The interior features modern three-flight stairs, with interiors rebuilt and lacking decoration.
- A tenement (14 St. John Street) was built in 1893 in an eclectic style with dominant Baroque Revival elements, replacing an earlier one-story house. Constructed on a rectangular plan, the compact form is broken by a central bay window. The three-story tenement, with a residential attic, is covered by a gable roof with dormers and skylights. The ground-floor facade, rebuilt and clad in red brick, is asymmetrical. The upper floors have seven axes, with the first, central, and last axes emphasized. The plastered facade under the crowning cornice includes outer axes, the bay window, and a band. The facade is richly decorated with cartouches, masks, floral motifs (especially in window pediments), and consoles in the crowning cornice band. The entrance hall retains a ceramic floor and two-flight steel stairs with a wooden balustrade with turned balusters.

Historic bourgeois tenements are also located at numbers 11 and 12.

Trams operate along the street under the Metropolitan Transport Authority, with a stop named Katowice Św. Jana.

== See also ==
- History of Katowice
