= Legnica City Hall =

Building erected in 1905 in the Neo-Renaissance style in Legnica, Poland

Coordinates: 51.2067°N 16.1625°E

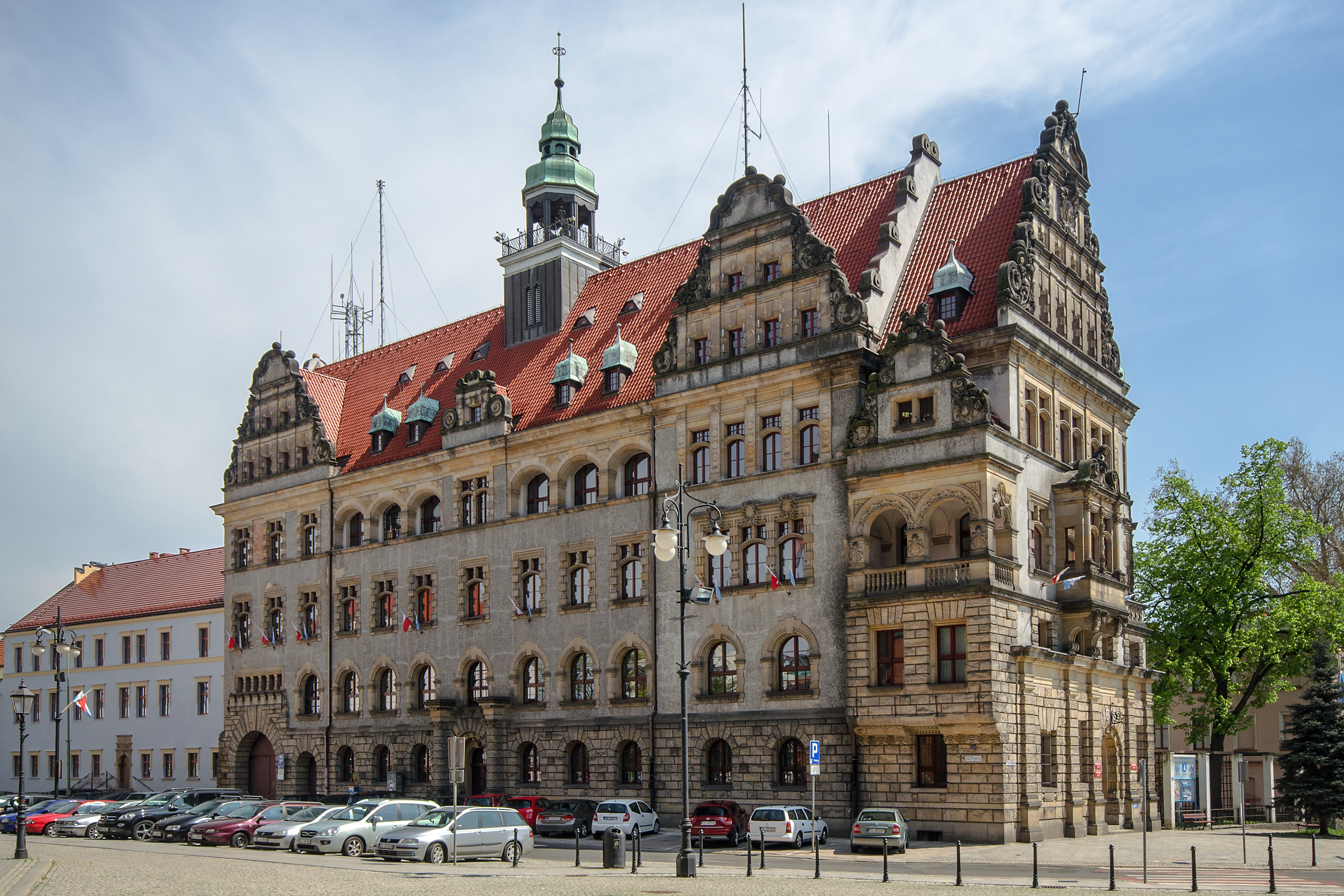
Legnica City Hall

Legnica City Hall, erected in 1905 in the Neo-Renaissance style, is currently the seat of the city authorities of Legnica, Poland.

== History ==
As a result of the development of the city at the end of the 19th century, a need to build a new, larger town hall arose. The new seat of Legnica's municipal authorities was erected in 1902-1905 according to the design of the construction counselor Paul Öhlmann. The building is the result of the first part of the project, which ultimately included the construction of a four-wing complex with two inner courtyards and a monumental tower. The project, probably due to lack of funds, was never completed.

By the decision of the provincial conservator the building was entered in the register of monuments on April 14, 1981.

== Architecture ==
The new town hall is a grand neo-Renaissance building erected on the plan of the letter L. It has five storeys, two external risalits and is covered with gable roofs with dormer windows. There is a flèche on the ridge, and the roofs are covered with richly decorated neo-Renaissance gables. The flèche is topped with a helmet with two openings. The elevations are richly decorated with architectural details such as: bays, bossage and window frames. The sculptural details decorating the northern bay window refer to the city's past. The pillars of the loggia are decorated with knights with the coats of arms of Silesia, Legnica and Prussia. A cartouche with the town's coat of arms, consisting of two crossed keys, appears at the top of the pediment. Above it, a statue of a Czech lion was placed - the coat of arms of Legnica. The two and a half-tiered interiors have communication corridors and are covered with barrel vaults with lunettes. This building is the seat of the city authorities.

== Gallery ==
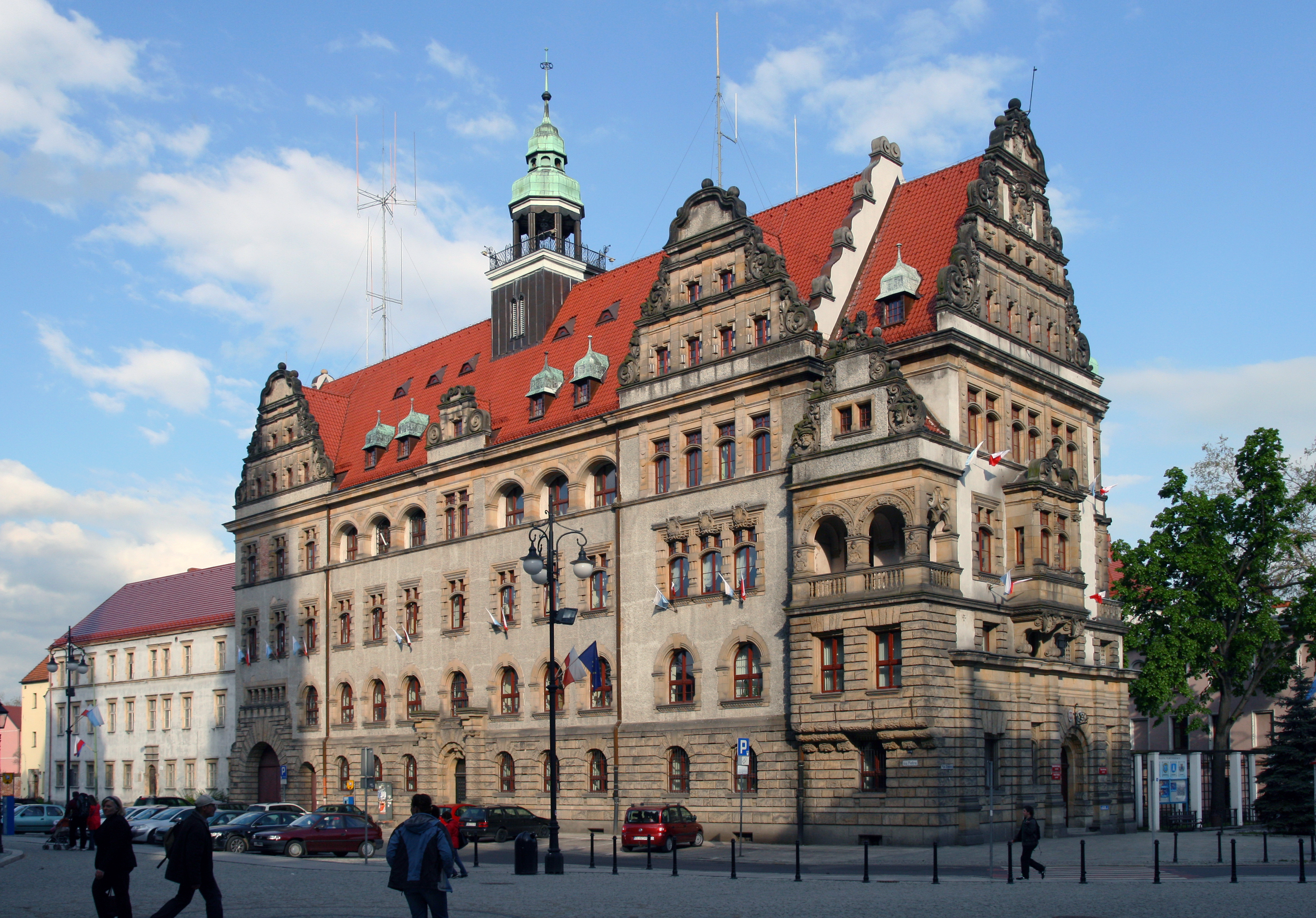

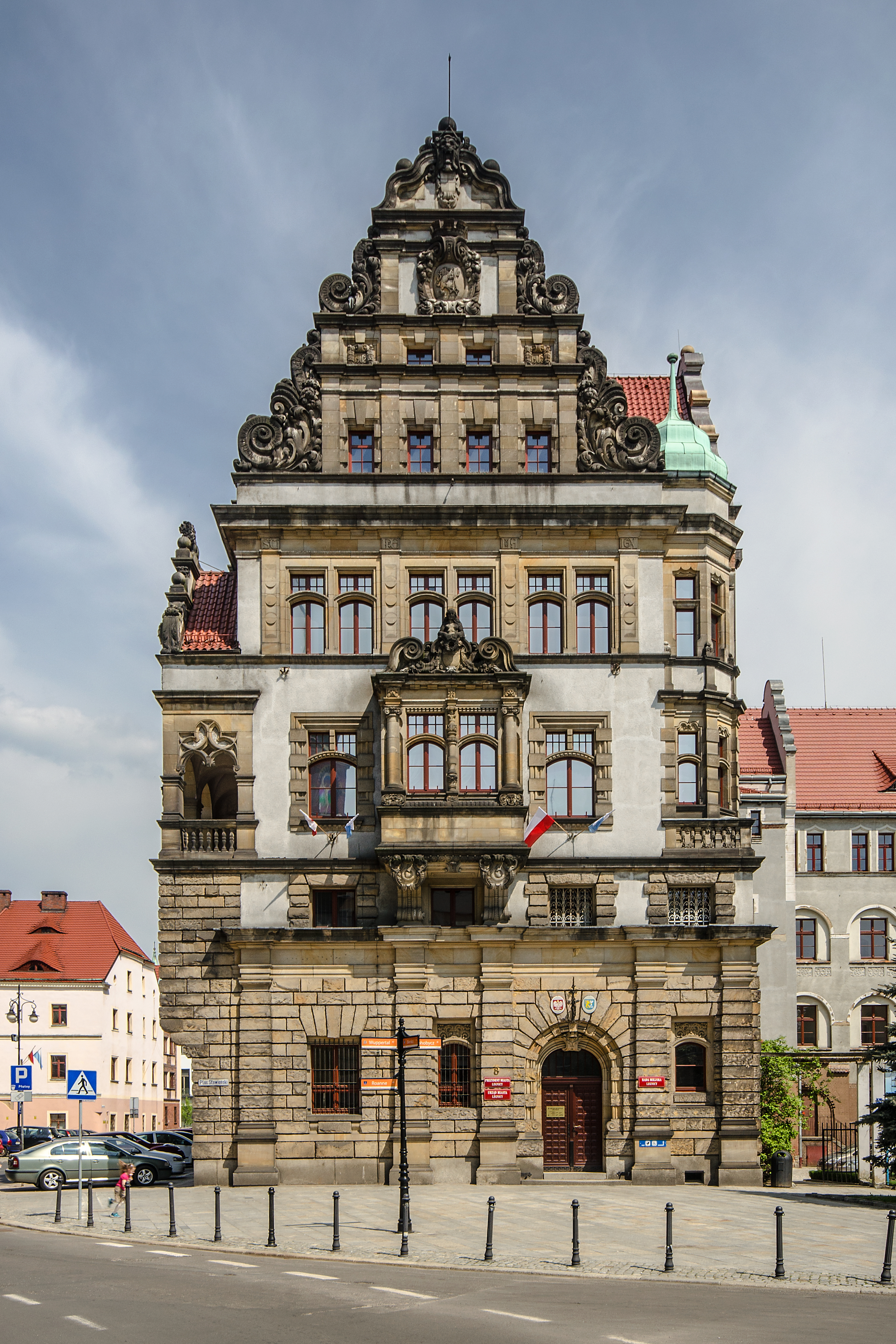

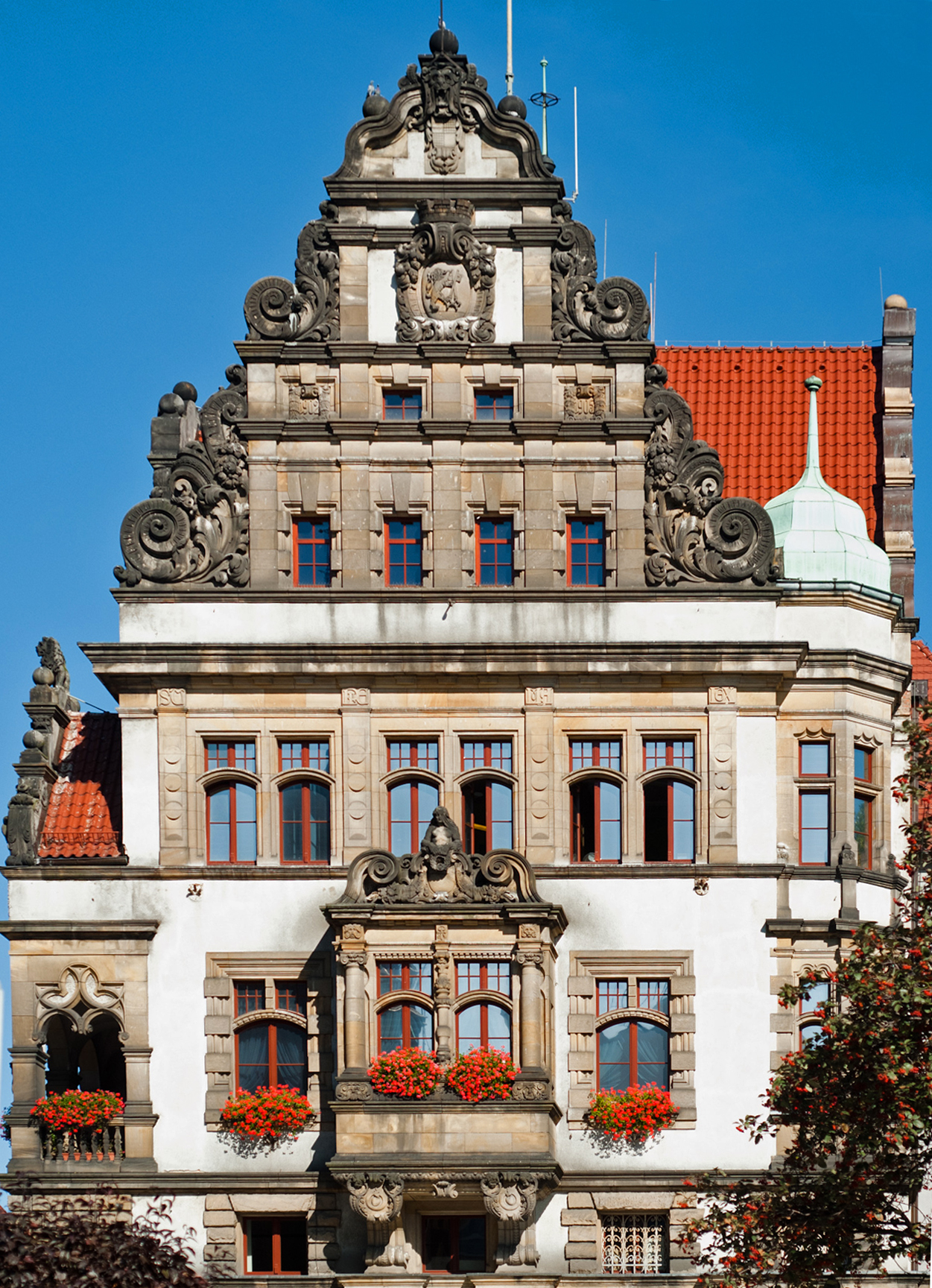

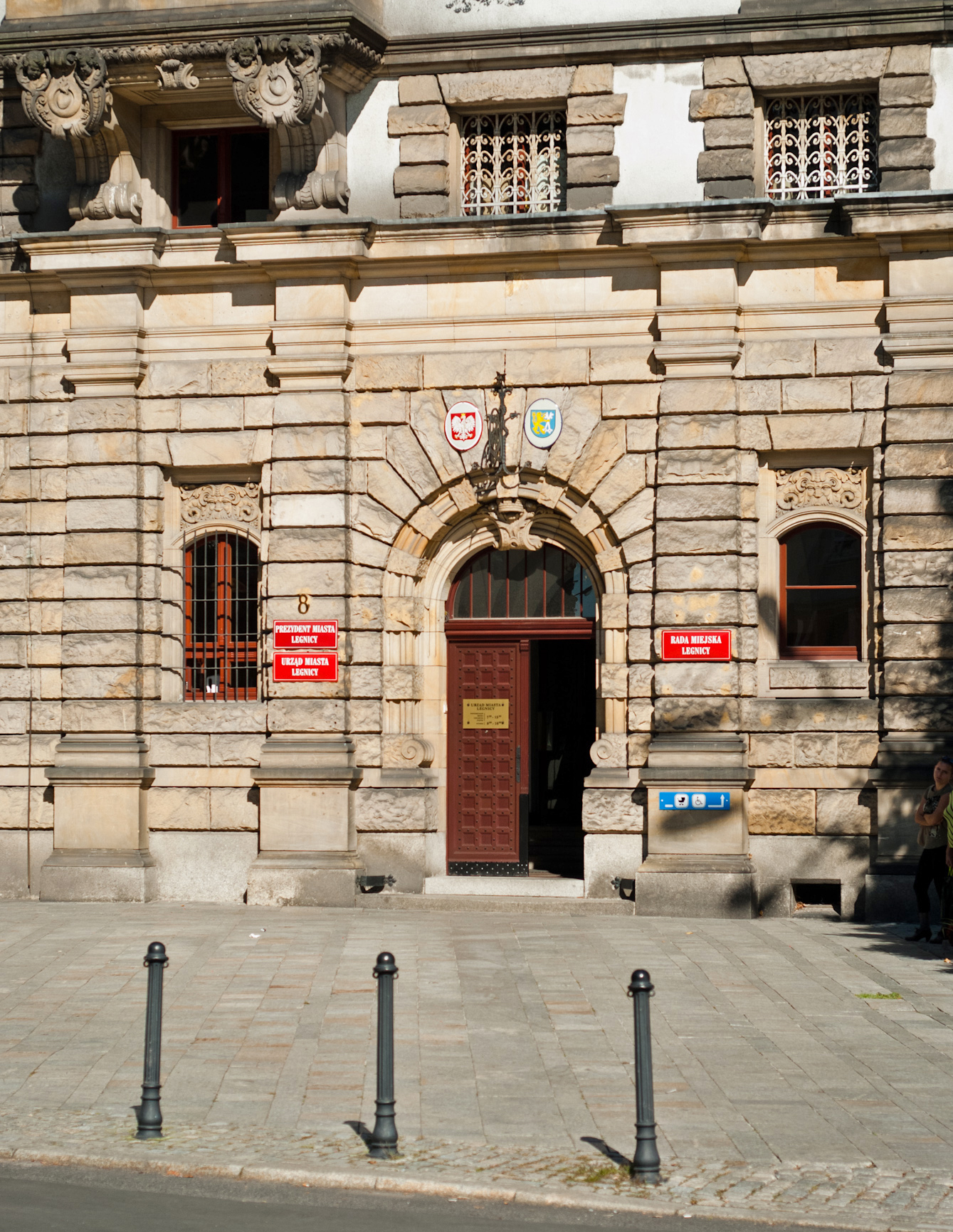
