= Lifting boss =

Knob left on stones by masons for levering or lifting

Lifting bosses or handling bosses are protrusions intentionally left on stones by masons to facilitate maneuvering the blocks with ropes and levers.

They are an important feature of ancient and classical construction, and were often left behind, despite having fulfilled their purpose. Sometimes this was the result of a cost-saving measure or a construction halt. Other times, bosses were left as a stylistic element, and even if dressed back, a remnant of them was kept to make their existence obvious.

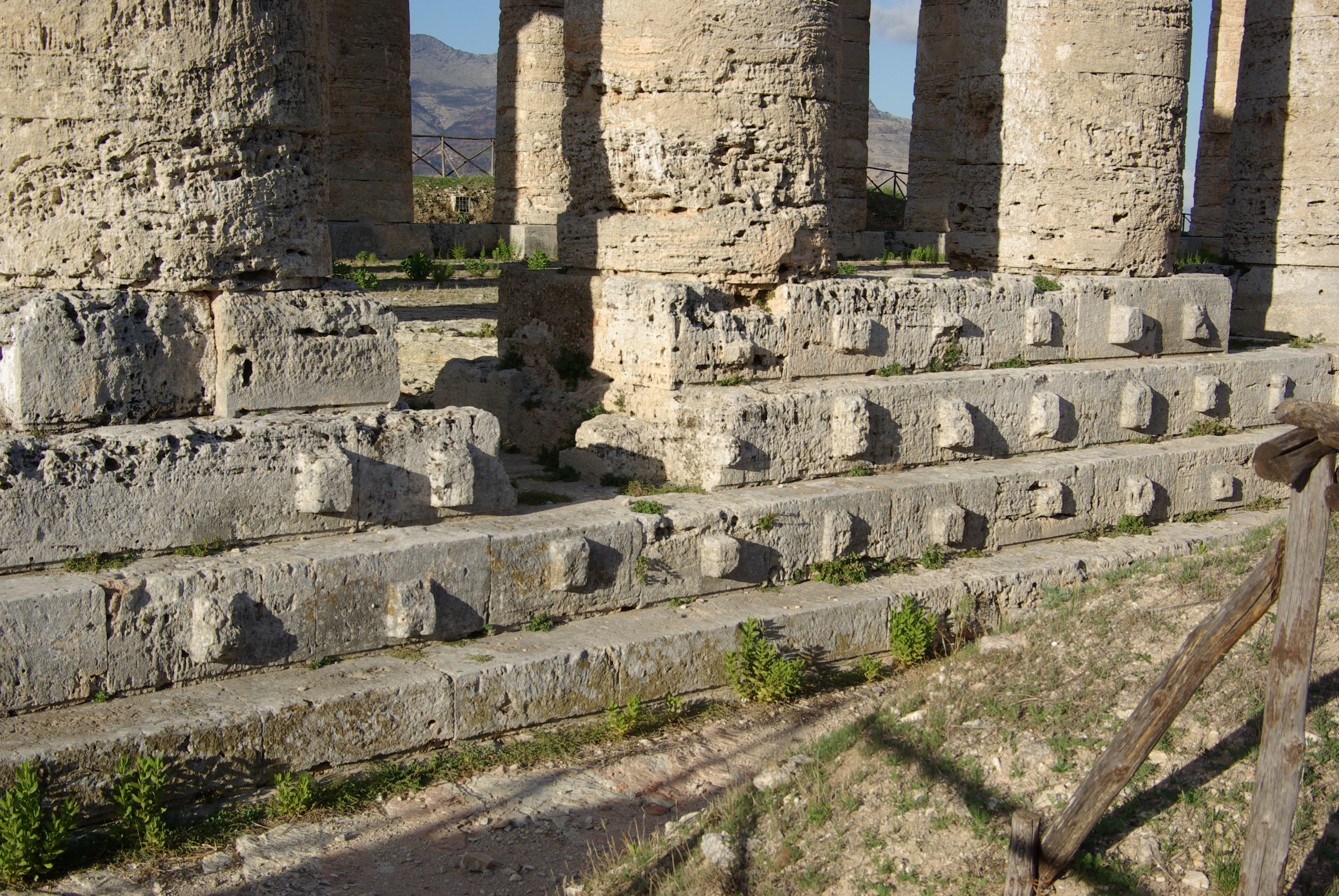
Lifting bosses of the crepidoma (base) of the Segesta temple, Sicily

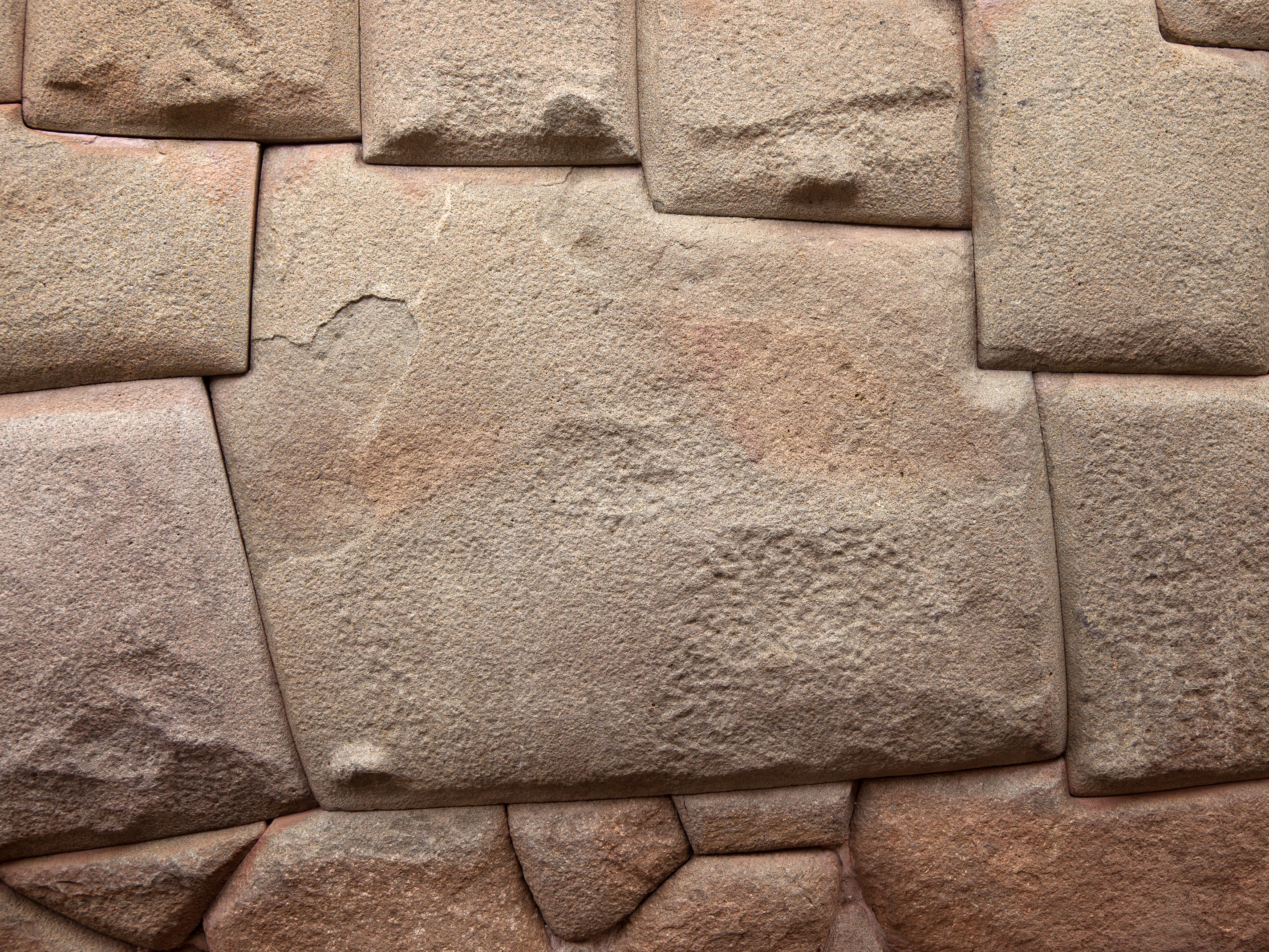
Levering bosses left on Inca walls of Cusco, Peru

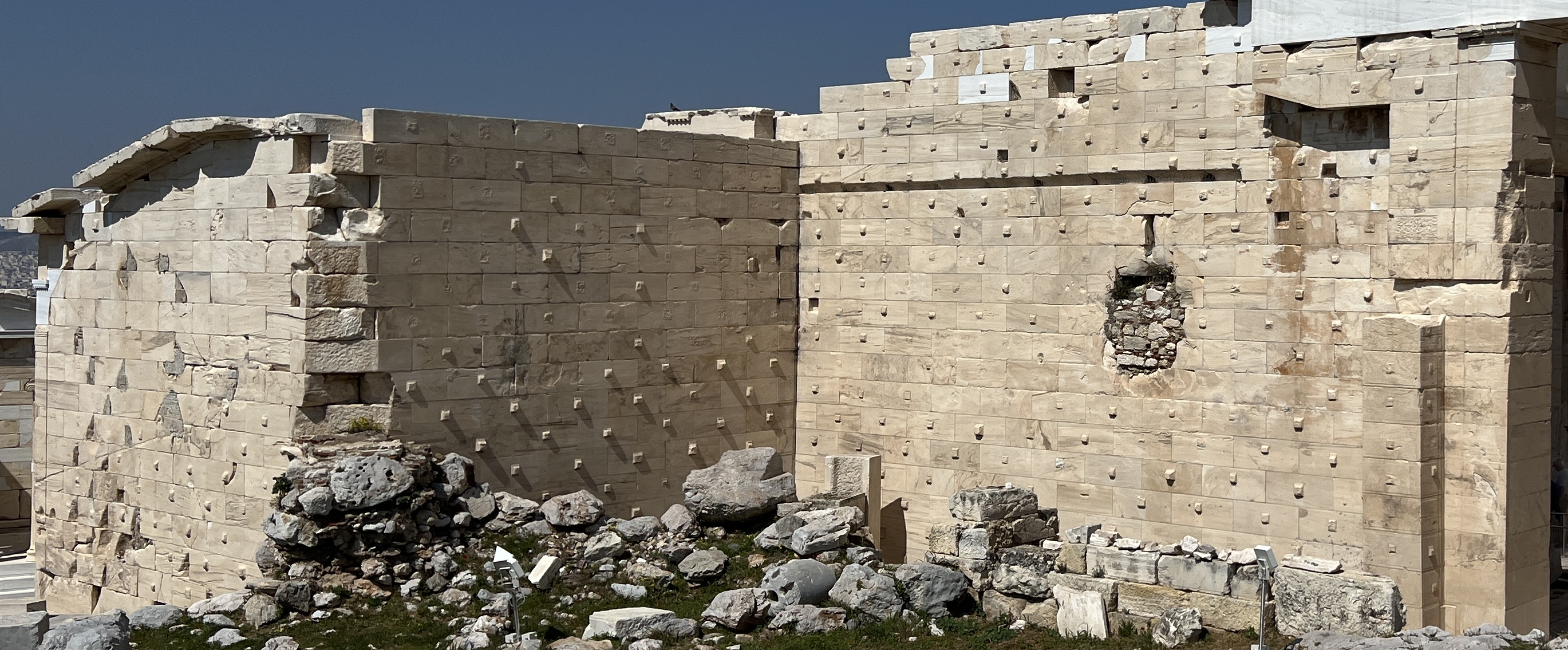
Bosses on the Propylaia (Acropolis of Athens)

== See also ==
- Boss (architecture)
- Bossage
