= Boss (architecture) =

Decorative knob

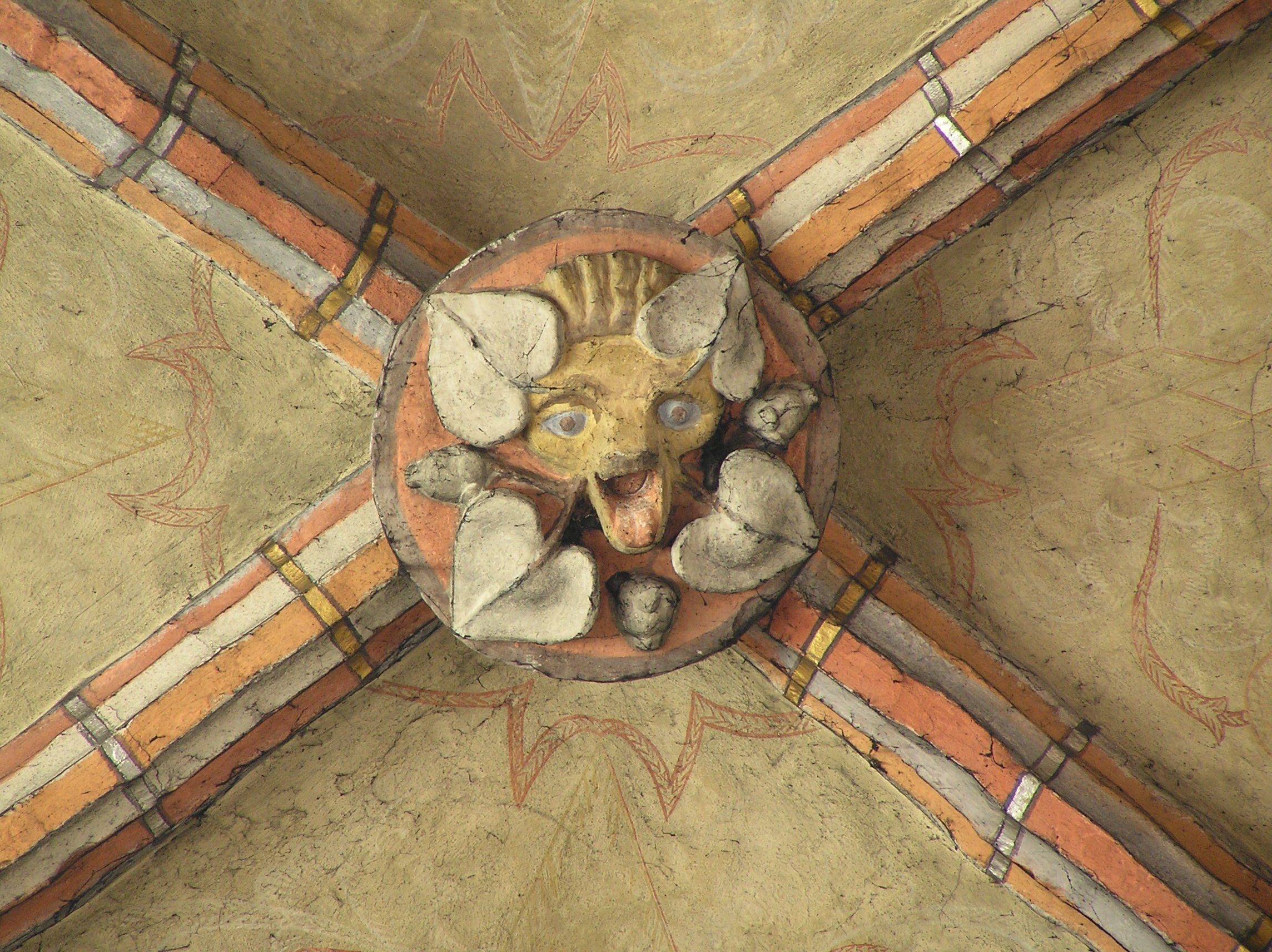
Rib vault keystone with boss, in the Church of St Mary in Chełmno, Poland

In architecture, a boss is either a decorative knob on a ceiling, wall or sculpture, or a prominence on an ashlar.

== Decorative boss ==
Bosses can often be found in the ceilings of buildings, particularly at the keystones at the intersections of a rib vault. In Gothic architecture, such roof bosses (or ceiling bosses) are often intricately carved with foliage, heraldic devices or other decorations. Many feature animals, birds, or human figures or faces, sometimes realistic, but often Grotesque: the Green Man is a frequent subject.

The Romanesque Norwich Cathedral in Norfolk, United Kingdom, has the largest number of painted carved stone bosses in the world; an extensive and varied collection of over one thousand individual pieces. Many of these decorated bosses still bear the original gilt and pigments from the time of their creation.

== 'Boss' in masonry ==
The 'boss' in the context of ashlars is a raised bump left projecting outward from the outer face of a so-called bossed, rusticated, or quarry-faced ashlar used in bossed or drafted margin masonry. It is used in an ancient stonecutting technique in which only the margins of the ashlar's outer face are neatly dressed using a mallet and chisel, which helps the mason fit the ashlar tightly into the wall, while much of the outer face (the boss) is protruding from the smoothly dressed frame, and is either left rough or given a regular shape and surface texture.

== Gallery ==
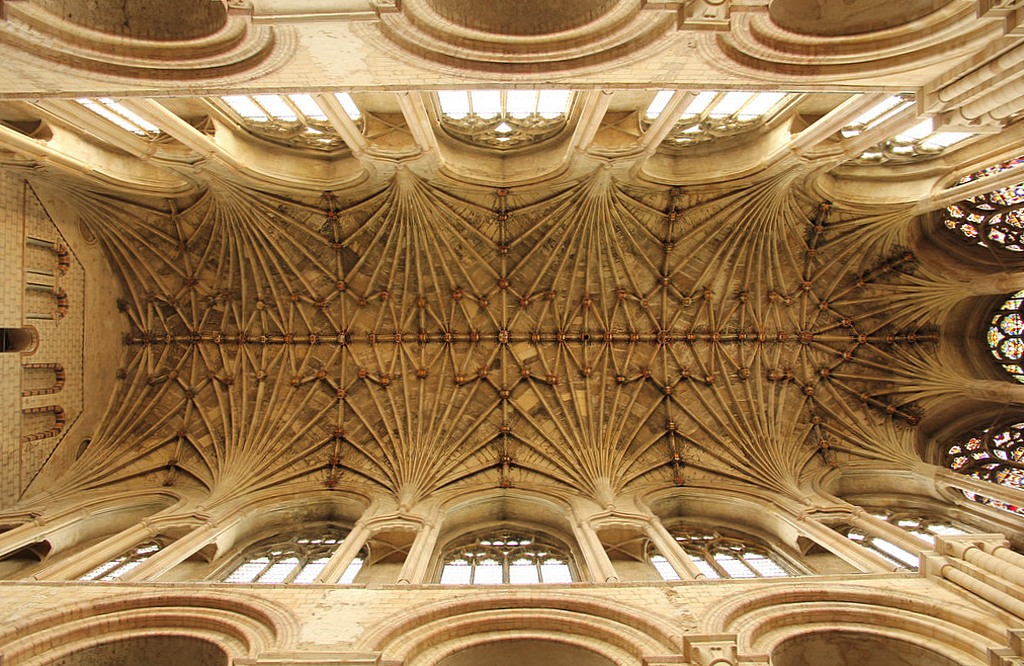
Norwich Cathedral's choir vault with multiple bosses

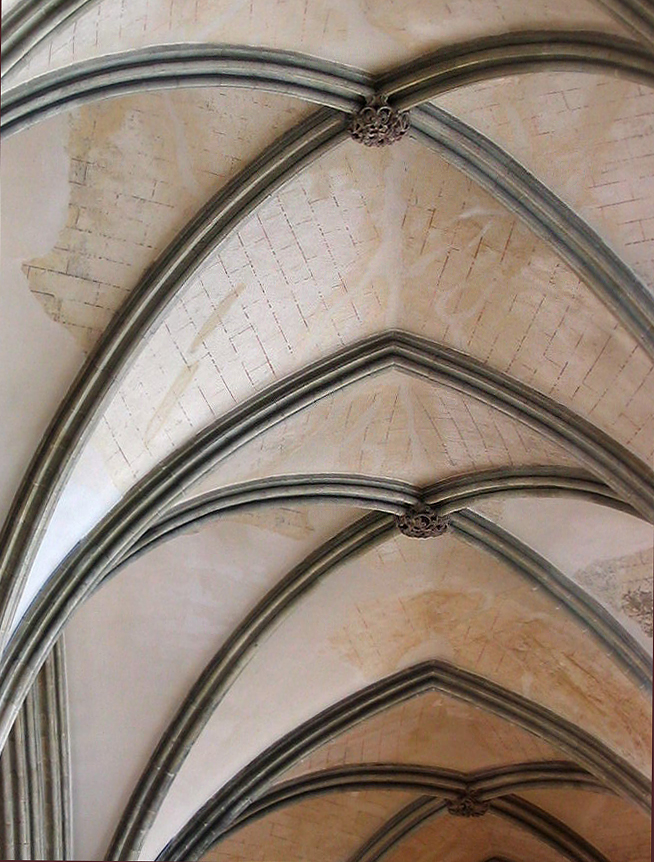
Early English roof bosses in Salisbury Cathedral, England

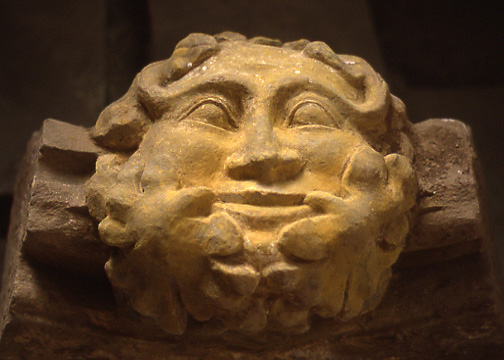
Green Man roof boss from Dore Abbey, in Herefordshire, England

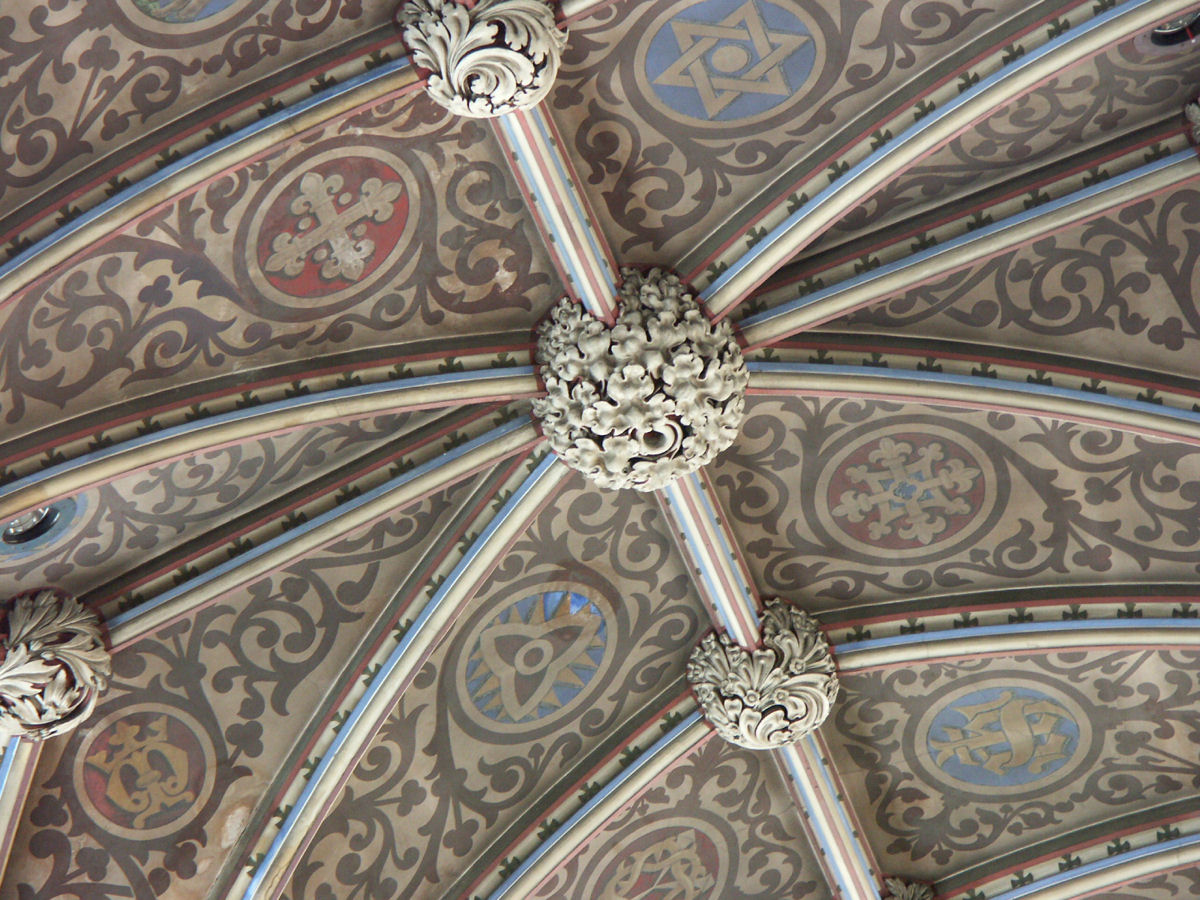
Bosses at Hereford Cathedral, England

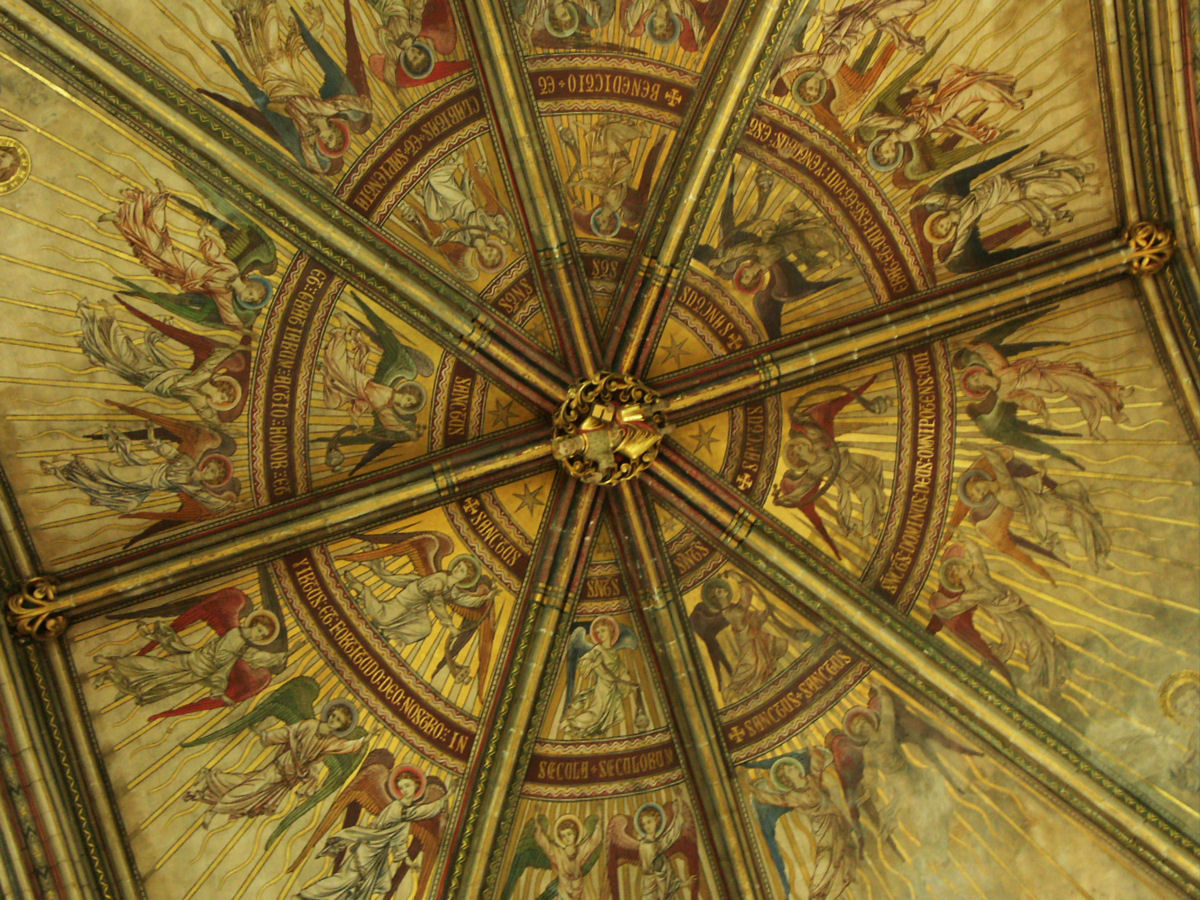
Bosses at Worcester Cathedral, England

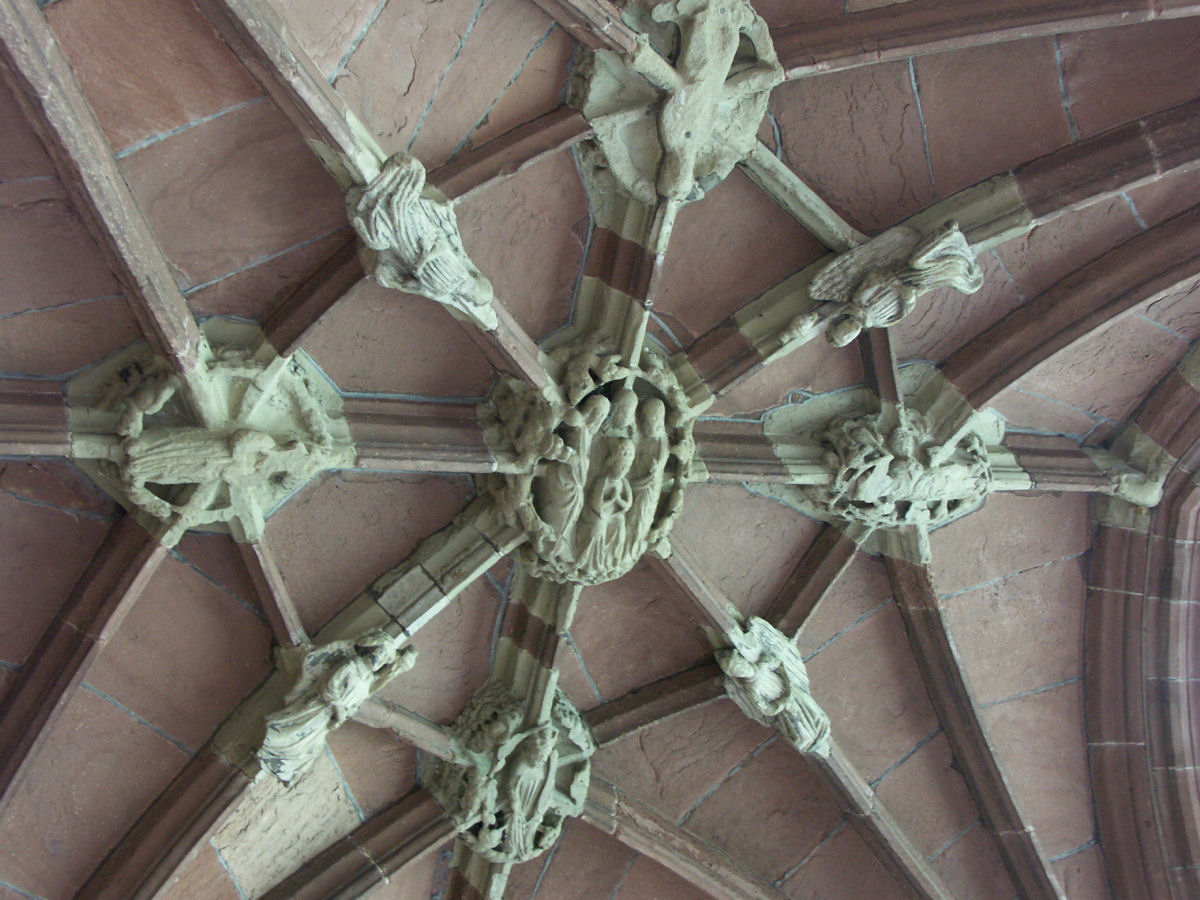
Bosses at Worcester Cathedral, England

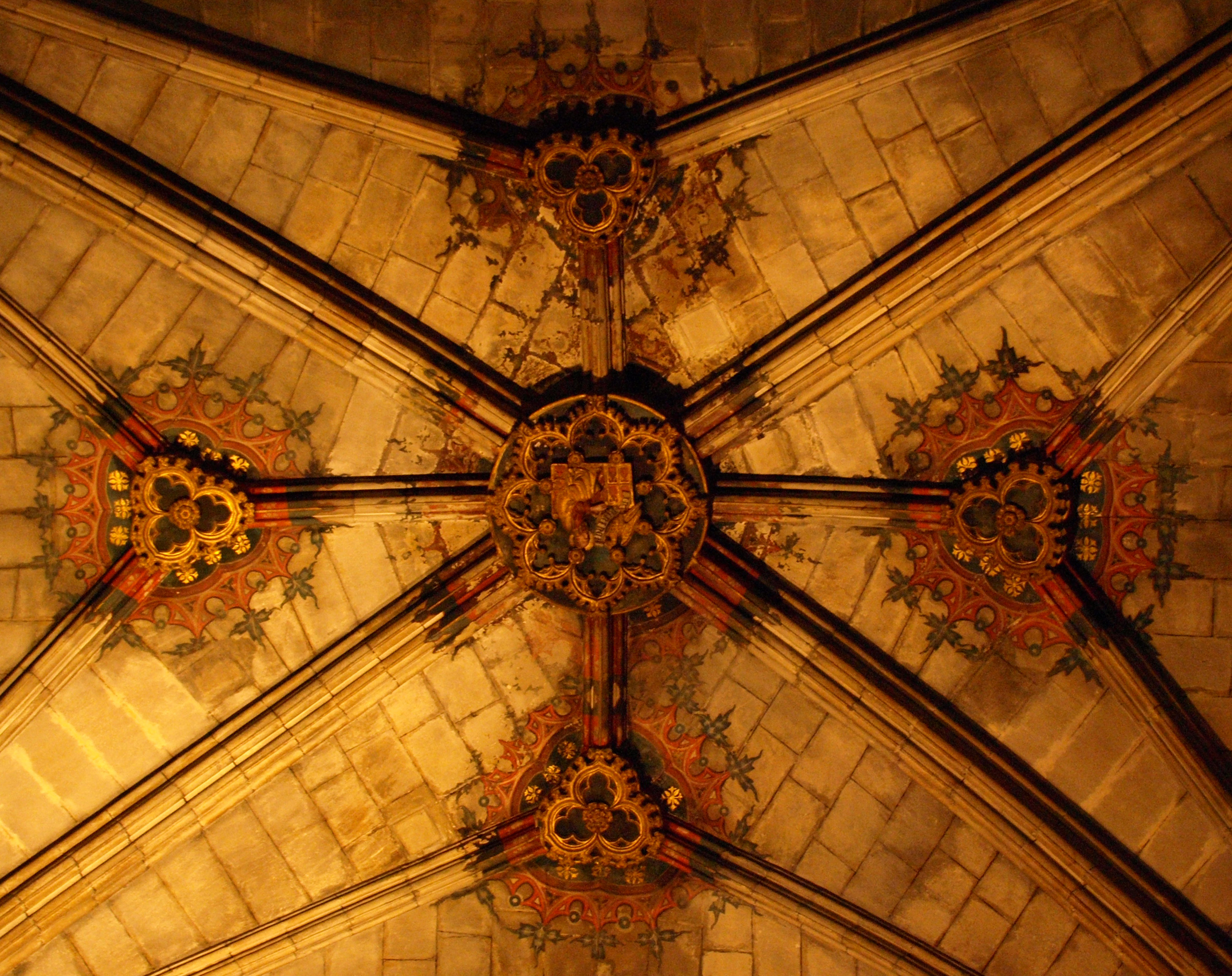
Bosses at Barcelona Cathedral, Spain

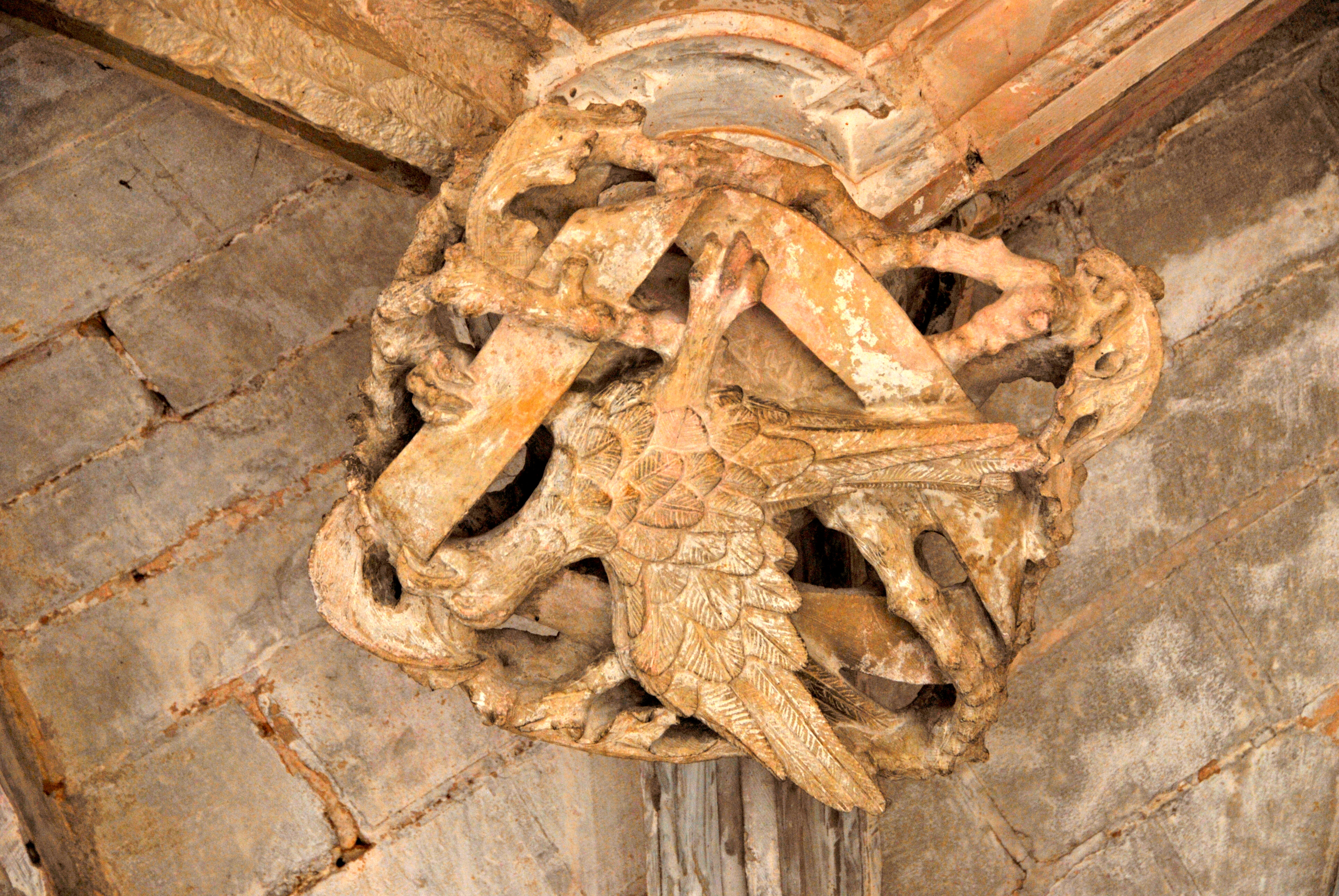
Griffin boss at Cadouin Abbey, Dordogne, France

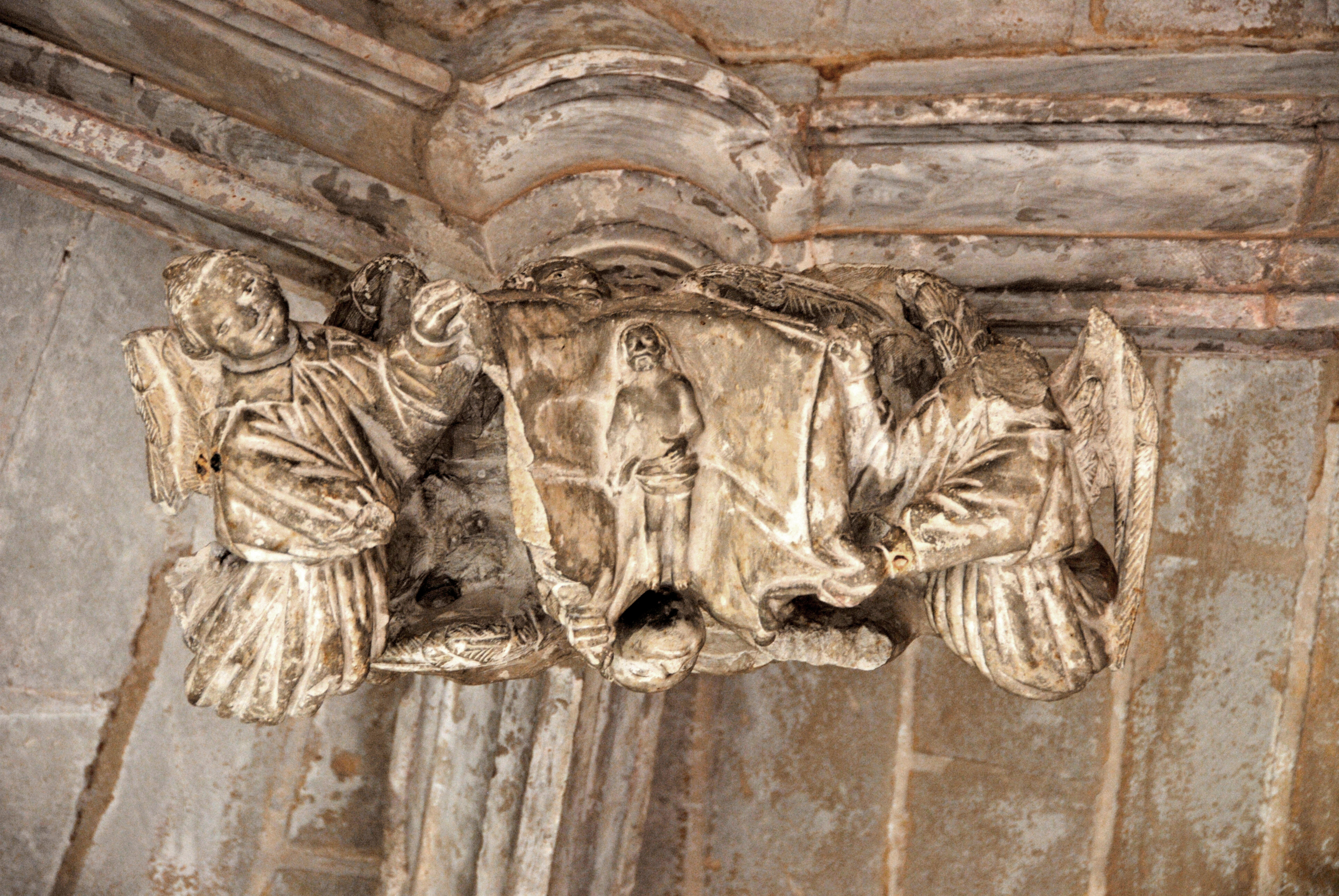
Boss showing the Veil of Veronica at Cadouin Abbey, France

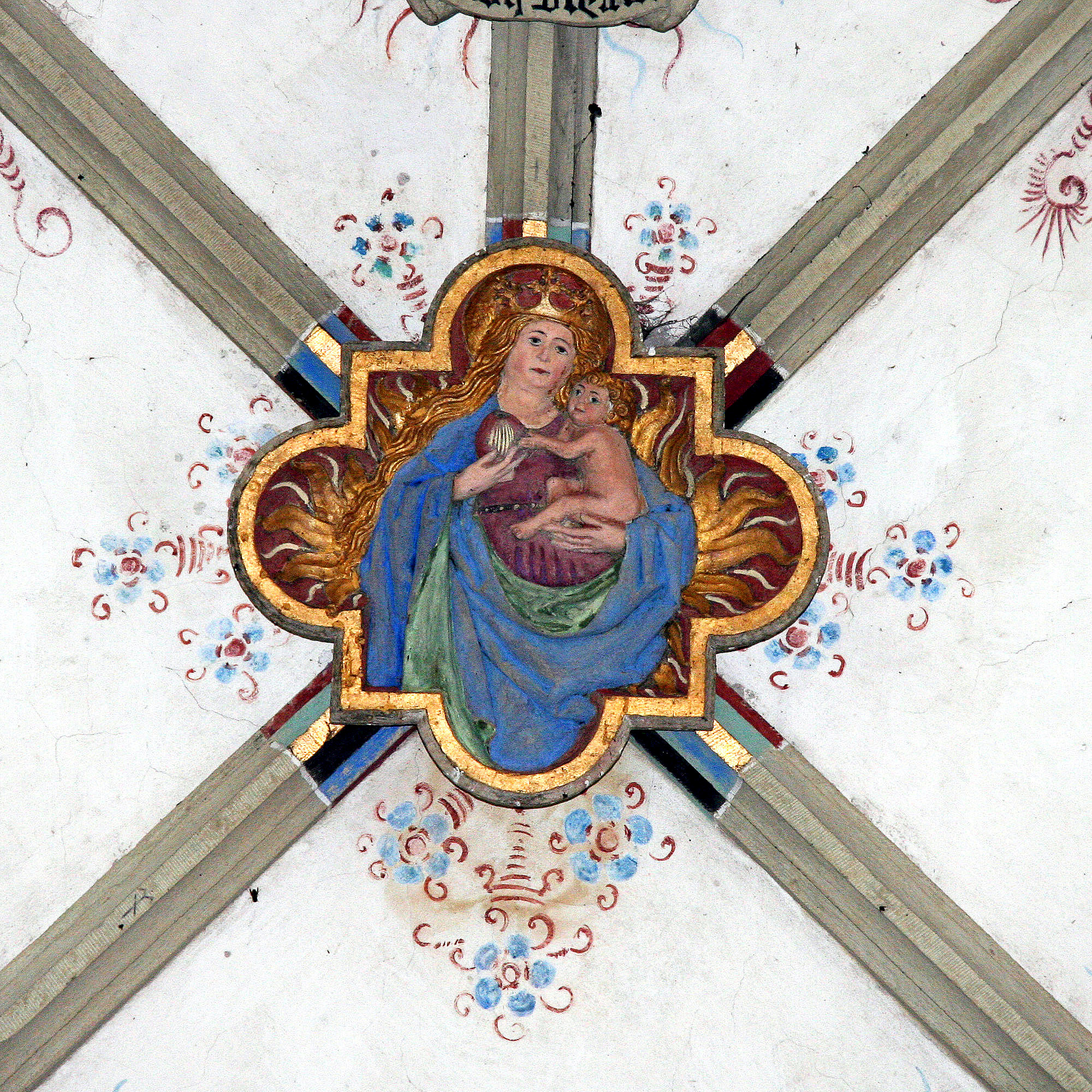
Madonna and Child boss in Germany

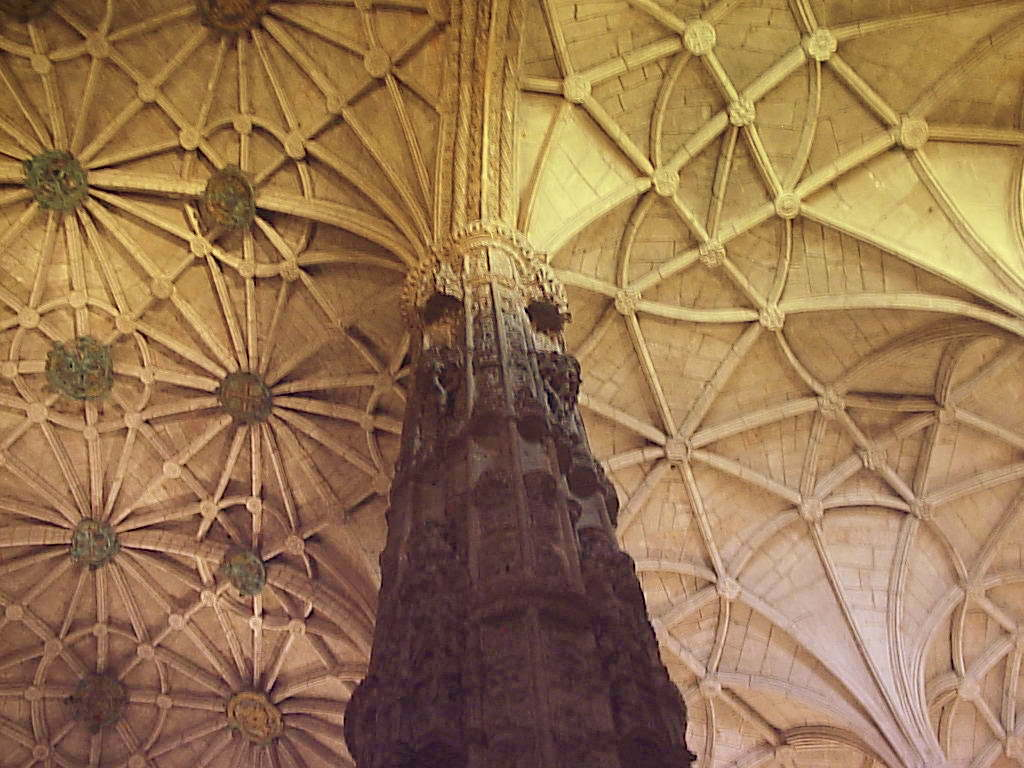
Bosses at Jerónimos Monastery, Portugal

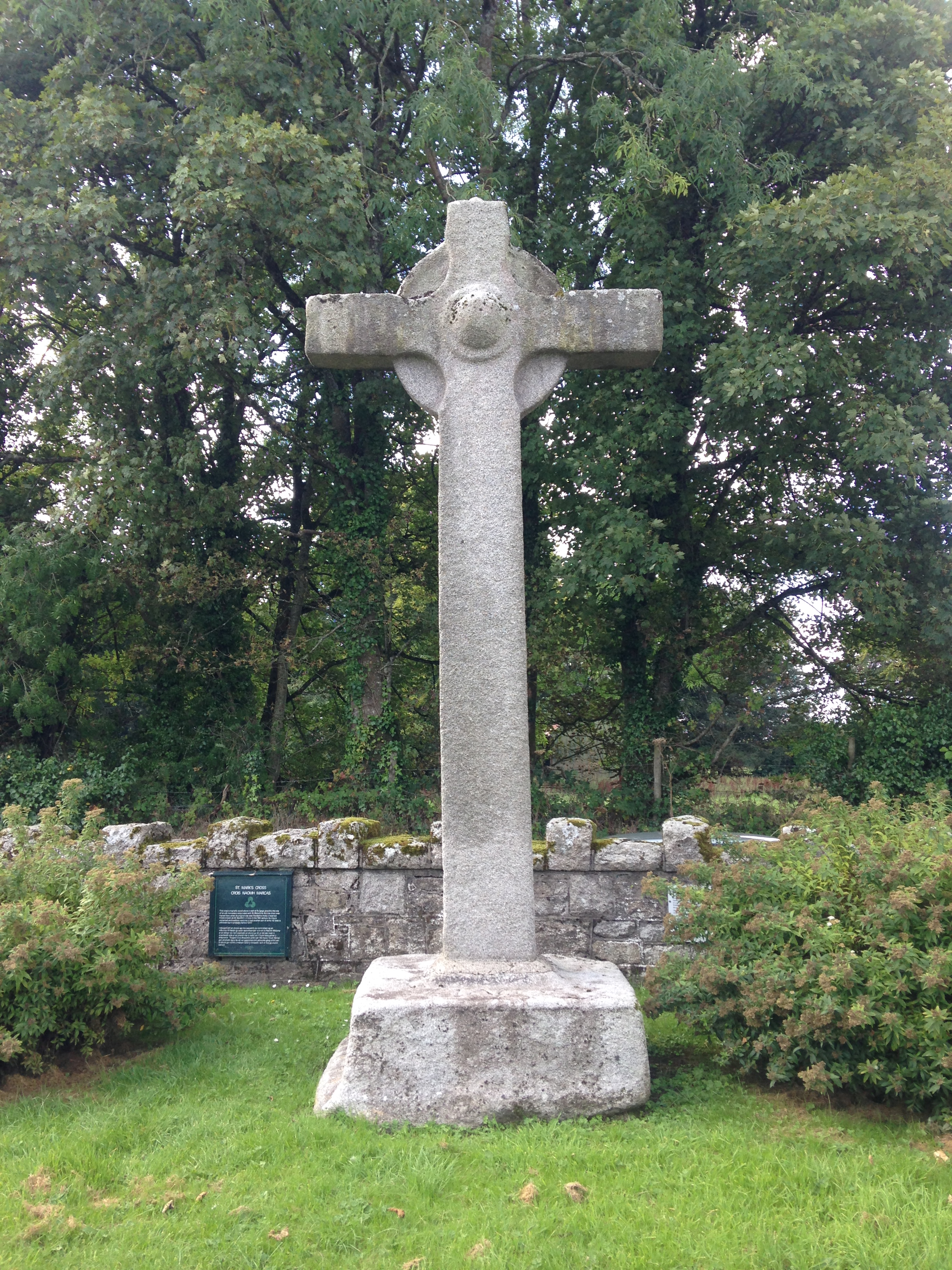
Boss on St Mark's Cross, Blessington, County Wicklow, Ireland

== See also ==
- Bossage, bossed ashlar
- Lifting boss
- Three hares
