= Staromiejska Street =

Street in Katowice, Poland

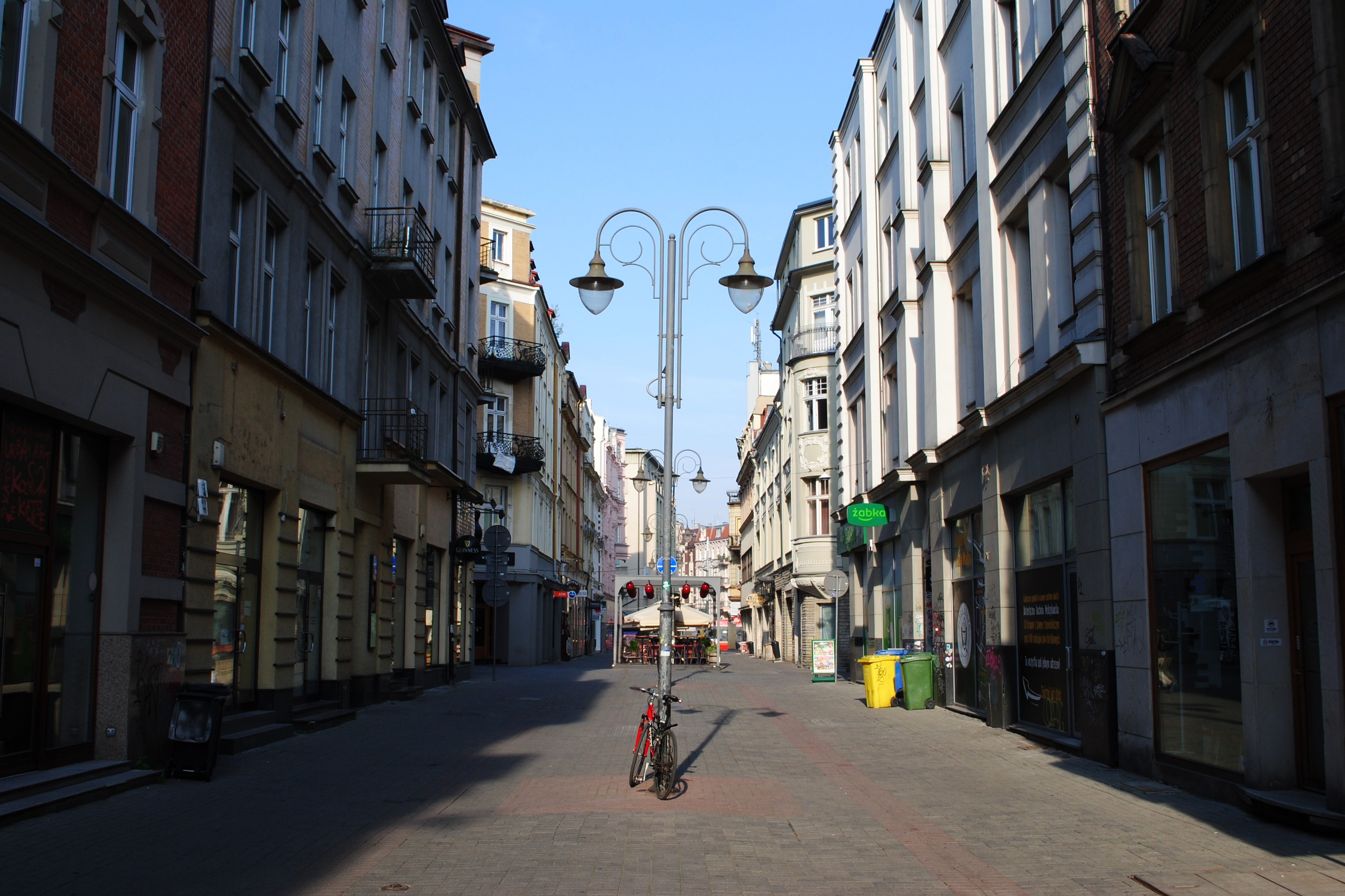
- Staromiejska Street facing west (2024)
- Interactive map of Staromiejska Street
- Former name(s): Querstraße, Bronisław Pieracki Street, Mollwitzstraße, Wojciech Korfanty Street, Józef Wieczorek Street
- Part of: Śródmieście
- Length: 206 m (676 ft)
- Location: Katowice, Silesian Voivodeship, Poland
- Coordinates: 50°15′30.64″N 19°01′22.1″E
- From: St. John Street, Market Square
- Major junctions: Dyrekcyjna Street (85 m)
- To: Andrzej Mielęcki Street (206 m)

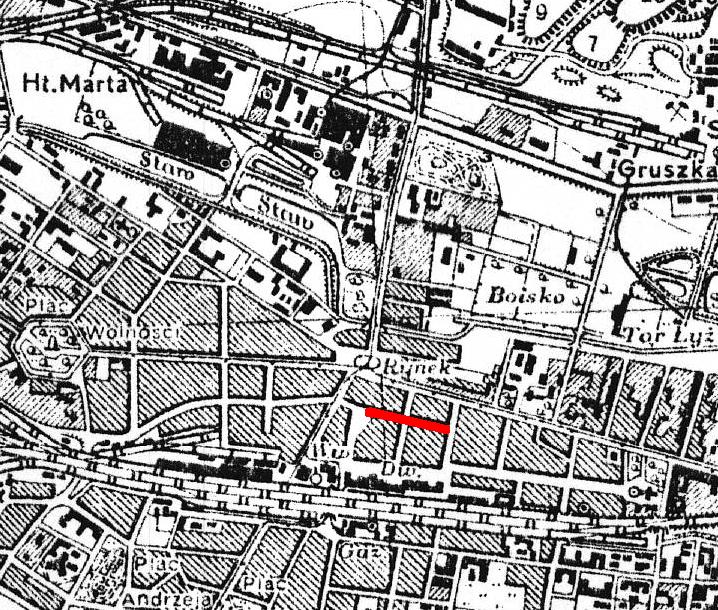
Staromiejska Street, marked with a red line, on a 1933 map by the Military Geographical Institute

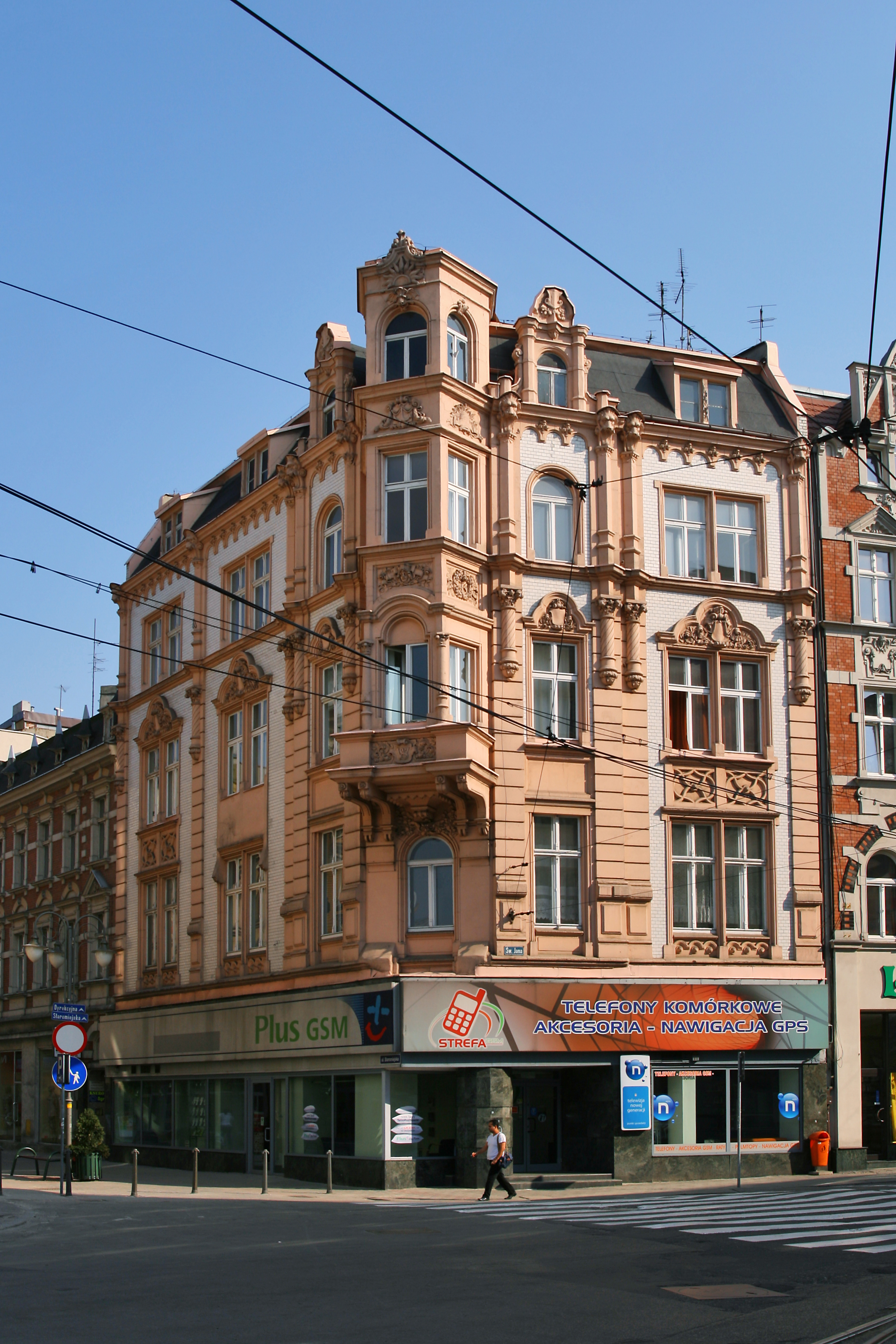
Historic tenement at 1 Staromiejska Street, corner with St. John Street

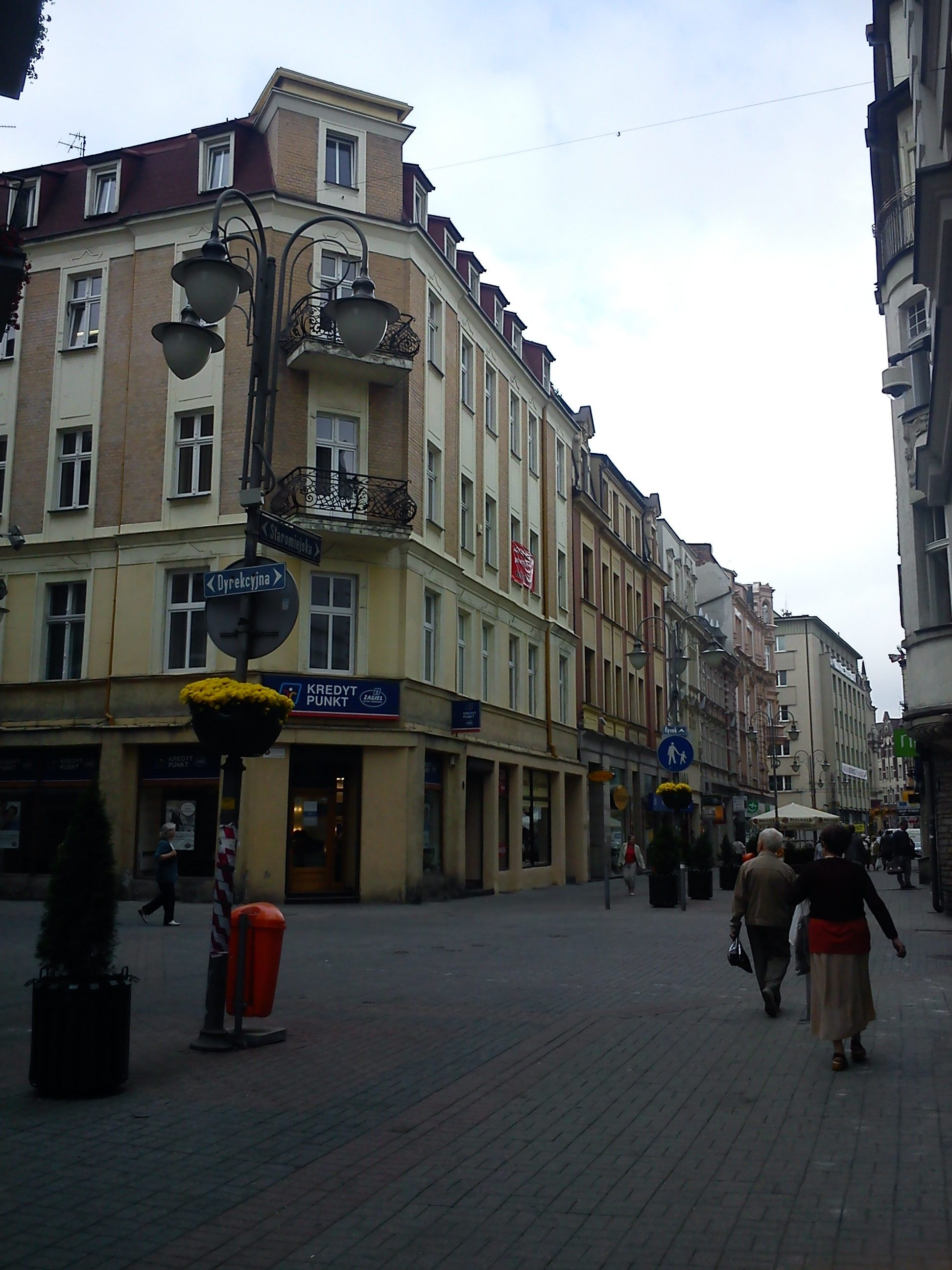
Staromiejska Street at the intersection with Dyrekcyjna Street

Staromiejska Street is one of the oldest streets in the Śródmieście district of Katowice, Poland. It begins at the intersection with St. John Street near the Market Square, intersects with Dyrekcyjna Street, and ends at Andrzej Mielęcki Street. Spanning 206 meters, the street is recognized by city authorities as a representative and socially integrative public space.

== History ==
Originally part of a route leading to Mysłowice, the street was shortened and realigned in 1856, when it was named Querstraße (meaning "Cross Street"). In the 1860s, through the efforts of Count Thiele-Wickler, Katowice developed its first sewage channels to drain wastewater from manor buildings. One such channel ran from the intersection of Querstraße (now Staromiejska Street) and Johanesstraße (now St. John Street) through Pocztowa Street to a pond formed by the Rawa stream at the Marta Ironworks.

In 1902, Telesfor Nowicki established the Polish bookstore Górnoślązak at the street. In 1905, the street housed the clandestine Tomasz Zan Society, based at Nowicki's bookstore. From 1907 until the outbreak of World War II, a theater operated on the ground floor of the rear wing at 17 Staromiejska Street, which was converted into the Apollo cinema-theater in 1911, colloquially known as the "den of vice".

The oldest surviving restaurant on the street, Tatiana, operates at 5 Staromiejska Street; an earlier restaurant at 2 Staromiejska Street was closed. During the interwar period, it was known as Carlton. The street bore the name Staromiejska from 1922 to 1934, after which it was renamed in honor of Bronisław Pieracki, assassinated by Ukrainian nationalists. During the German occupation (1939–1945), it was called Mollwitzstraße. Post-war, it was named Bronisław Pieracki Street (1945–1947), Wojciech Korfanty Street (1947–1950), and Józef Wieczorek Street (1950–1990). On 8 October 1990, the Katowice City Council restored the name Staromiejska. Notable residents include Stanisław Rochowiak, who lived at 14 Staromiejska Street, and Sławomir Idziak, born at 7 Staromiejska Street.

== Description ==
Staromiejska Street is home to several historic buildings:

- Historic bourgeois tenement (1 Staromiejska Street, 6 St. John Street), listed in the Registry of Cultural Property (no. A/1393/89, 23 October 1989; currently A/1203/23). Built in the early 20th century in an eclectic style combining Renaissance Revival, Gothic Revival, and Baroque Revival elements, it originally featured a richly decorated facade, a corner bay window supported by atlas figures, and a dismantled turret (1929). The building, constructed on a near-rectangular plan, has an asymmetrical facade clad in white glazed brick, with anthropomorphic, geometric, and floral motifs in the pediments and window panels.
- Residential-commercial tenement (2 Staromiejska Street), listed in the Registry of Cultural Property (no. A/1441/91, 31 October 1991). Built in 1894 by R. Czieślik, with its facade renovated in 1911 and the ground and first floors remodeled between 1913 and 1914 (designed by Albert Köhler), it features an eclectic style with dominant Baroque Revival elements. Constructed on a rectangular plan with side and rear wings forming a courtyard, it has four stories and a symmetrical facade with lion heads and eagle figures in stucco decoration. From October 1922, Ludwik Fiszer ran a bookstore there, employing 20 people by 1928.
- Residential-commercial tenement (3 Staromiejska Street), built in the last decade of the 19th century in an eclectic style with Baroque Revival elements. Designed by an unknown architect, it has a rectangular plan with one side wing, a three-story structure, a basement, and a steep-pitched roof with mansard windows. The symmetrical six-axis facade features subtle avant-corps and plaster-decorated details, including women's heads in the pediments of the second-floor windows.
- Residential-commercial tenement (5 Staromiejska Street), erected at the end of the 19th century in the eclectic style with elements of Baroque Revival and Rococo Revival. The design was most likely prepared by the builder Czieślik. The building was extended upward in the 1930s. It was constructed on a rectangular plan with a rear annex. The body is compact, with a slight false avant-corps on the outer axis; it is four-storeyed, with a basement, and covered by a gable roof. The ground floor was later rebuilt. The gateway is located on the first axis. The three-axis, asymmetrical front façade is plastered. The first axis is wider and forms a slight false avant-corps. The third storey is crowned with a cornice supported by consoles. The fairly rich architectural detail was executed in plaster and carved in stone. The rectangular windows are framed with eared surrounds. In the window pediments (triangular on the second storey and arched on the third), there are stucco decorations depicting plant motifs, anthropomorphic figures, and shell designs. The widest and outermost axis received the richest decoration. The double-flight staircase with a decorative metal balustrade has been preserved, as well as one original stained-glass window on the stairwell. In the interwar period, the Carlton restaurant operated in the tenement, owned by Karol Łukaszek.
- Historic tenement (6 Staromiejska Street, corner with Dyrekcyjna Street), listed in the Registry of Cultural Property (no. A/1544/94, 29 August 1994; no. A/676/2020, 17 July 2020). Erected between 1904 and 1906 in the Modernist style, probably according to a design by Ignatz Grünfeld. In the 1950s, the attic was rebuilt and adapted for use as an additional storey. The building was constructed on a U-shaped plan. Its massing consists of two wings with a corner, two-storey bay window. The plastered façade was designed asymmetrically. Beneath the windows of the third storey are panels with stucco decoration featuring geometric motifs, while the corner is adorned with vertical bands. Both wings are closed by balcony loggias. The double-flight staircase was rebuilt but retains its original decorative metal balustrade. In the interwar period, the Opera café owned by Herman Gorlitz operated in the building.
- Residential-commercial tenement (8 Staromiejska Street), built in the late 19th century by German architect Grünberg. During the interwar period, it was home to Dr. Henryk Weinberg and, until 1914, Dr. Eduard Preis, a gynecologist.
- Historic tenement (10 Staromiejska Street), built in 1892 in an eclectic style with Gothic Revival and Art Nouveau elements. It is a corner building with bay windows located at the corner. The façade of the tenement is faced with glazed white brick. Decorations and stuccowork are placed mainly above the windows. In the interwar period, the building housed the headquarters of the Discount Bank, as well as M. Stahl's technical materials warehouse, and the Bobrek clothing shop.
- Historic tenement (14 Staromiejska Street), erected according to a design by A. Scheer in the Baroque Revival style, featuring a turret at the corner. The building's façade is faced with yellow brick. The tripartite rectangular windows are divided by plaster bands. The upper plastered storey of the building is separated by a cornice. Ceramic tiles lining the walls of the entrance hall have been preserved. In the interwar period, the building housed the Tatrzańska eatery, as well as the offices of the Workers' Sports Association and the District Commission of Trade Unions. Since 1945, the Cichy Barek bar has operated there.
- Combined residential-service tenements (17 and 19 Staromiejska Street). Number 17 was built around 1899, and number 19 in 1896 by Erich Kail in an eclectic style with northern Renaissance Revival elements. In 1907, the buildings, owned by Paul Kneler, housed a restaurant and cabaret theater run by Alois Swoboda. In 1911, the buildings were purchased by brothers Alexander and Marceli Moscovitch, who renamed the theater Apollo. Its hall featured elegant décor, balconies, and some seats arranged at tables for dining. According to contemporary advertisements, cabaret performances were presented daily from 8 PM. The Apollo bar also operated in the building. During the interwar period, the Moscovitch brothers remained the owners of No. 17, while the neighboring tenement (No. 19) was owned by Berta Anita Teresa Moscovitch. She ran the Femina cabaret, and the building and its rear wing housed apartments for cabaret staff. The theater hall was also used for the Casino cinema with 600 seats, and nearby operated the Tabarin dancing bar. In the mid-1930s, No. 19 housed Bar Krakowski, run by Wawrzyn Kowalski, who lived next door at No. 17, apartment 2. After World War II, on 30 December 1954, the former cinema hall was opened as Teatr Satyry. A few years later, on 1 December 1958, it was organizationally incorporated into the Silesian Theater. Initially, the stage operated under the name Teatr Komedia, and from 1961 as Teatr Rozmaitości, a name chosen through a plebiscite announced by the Katowice afternoon newspaper Wieczór. The theater staged both lighter and more serious works. It was closed on 22 December 1971 due to alleged fire hazards.
- Residential-commercial tenement (21 Staromiejska Street, corner with Andrzej Mielęcki Street), listed in the Registry of Cultural Property (no. A/1542/94, 1 March 1994; no. A/723/2020, 26 October 2020). Built in 1905 in the Art Nouveau style, according to a design by architect Fryderyk Jaunich. It was constructed on an inverted L-shaped plan. The building has four storeys, a chamfered corner with a bay window, and a corner tower. The corner axes form a slight, apparent avant-corps. On the north façade, the second axis features a richly decorated portal with a cartouche bearing the date 1905. Since 1945, the building has housed Tomasz Sarnowski's café.

Other historic tenements are located at 4, 7, 11, 12, and 13/15 Staromiejska Street.
