= Bossage =

Uncut stone laid in place in a building

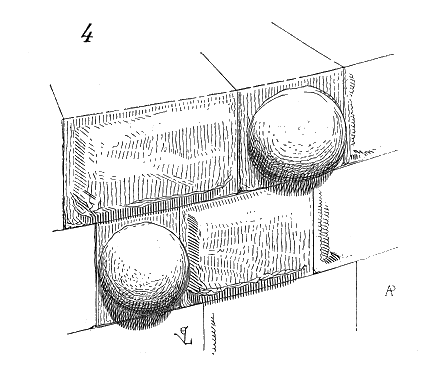

Bossage is uncut stone that is laid in place in a building, projecting outward from the building, to later be carved into decorative moldings, capitals, arms, etc.

Bossages are also rustic work, consisting of stones which seem to advance beyond the surface of the building, by reason of indentures, or channels left in the joinings; used chiefly in the corners of buildings, and called rustic quoins. The cavity or indenture may be round, square, chamfered, beveled, diamond-shaped, or enclosed with a cavetto or listel.

== Bossed ashlar, bossed masonry ==
A bossed ashlar, rusticated ashlar, or quarry-faced ashlar, used in bossed masonry or drafted margin masonry, is an ashlar worked in an ancient technique in which it is cut to fit tightly into the wall, but much of its outer face is left projecting outward in a raised bump called "boss". The boss can be either left rough, or given a regular shape and surface texture, while the sunken margins ('draft') are neatly dressed using a mallet and chisel.

The tooled border or margin of a faced stone is known as a draft.

=== History ===
The discovery of bossed ashlars in Ugarit might indicate that this technique was first developed in the 2nd millennium BCE. The examples there have 2 or 3, and only rarely 4 drafted margins around the bossed panel for functional, not decorative purposes, as they facilitated the placing of the block in the masonry. The margins were usually created with the stone cutters' percussive tools used for regularising the faces, and only rarely cut with a chisel. The masons worked economically, dressing as little as required for construction and leaving the rest of the blocks' surface raw.

In Israel, masonry of the Hellenistic period typically uses ashlar set in courses of headers and stretchers, with dressed margins around bosses protruding in the centre.

After being widely used by the Greeks and Romans, there was a hiatus in the use of rustication until the 13th and 14th centuries during the late Middle Ages, when it again became popular during the Crusades and in the architecture of the Hohenstaufen, when it was used in fortresses as well as in public buildings and private residences in Italy.

In spite of that, the renewed widespread use of rusticated masonry only took place during the Renaissance of the 15th and 16th centuries, as part of the renewed admiration for the ancient architectural schools and as a result of the research conducted at the start of the Florentine Renaissance.

== See also ==
- Glossary of architecture
- Lifting boss
- Rustication (architecture)
