= CSDA =

CSDA may refer to:

- Y-box-binding protein 3, a protein encoded by a gene sometimes denoted CSDA or CSDA1
- Certified Software Development Associate, a certification in software engineering
- in particle physics, the continuous slowing down approximation range, i.e. the path length after which a particle of a given kinetic energy is stopped, assuming it losts its energy continuously.
- Creation Seventh Day Adventist Church
