= Jean-Pierre Houdin =

French architect (born 1951)

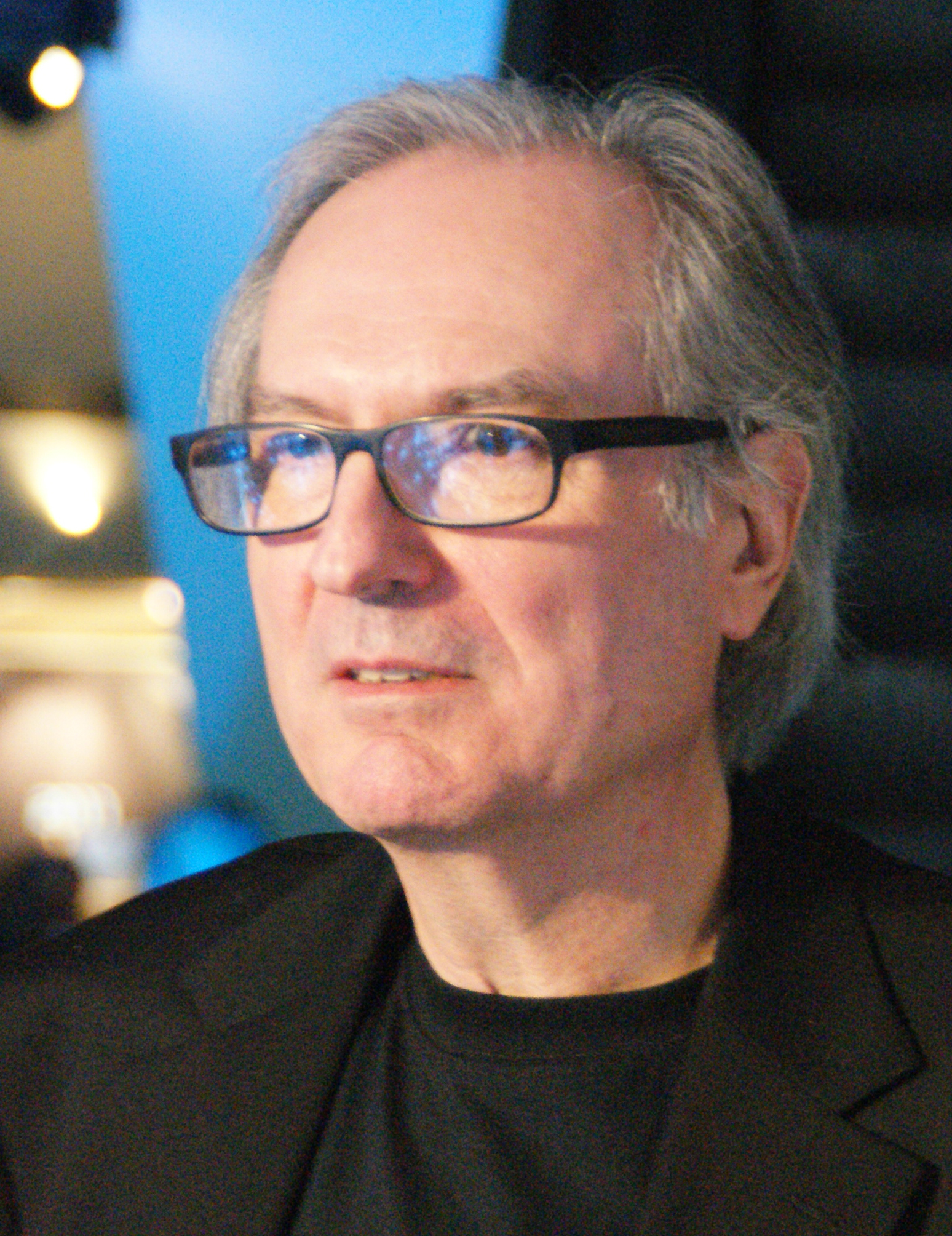
- Born: 1951 (age 74–75); Paris
- Occupation: Architect
- Design: Egyptian pyramid construction techniques

Jean-Pierre Houdin (French: [udɛ̃]; born 1951) is a French architect. He developed a theory detailing how the Great Pyramid of Giza was built. His theory posits an external ramp to build the lower portion, followed by an internal spiral ramp for the upper portion.

== Pyramid construction theory ==
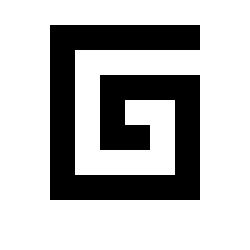
Scheme inside the pyramid

In 1999, Houdin's father, a retired civil engineer, started to develop the idea that the pyramids had been built from the inside. Jean-Pierre Houdin, using advanced 3D modelling technology, helped him identify a construction anomaly which they named "the spiral structure". It looked exactly like a ramp built inside the pyramid which they thought could have played a part in its construction. In 2003, his father created the Association of the Construction of the Great Pyramid (ACGP) in order to promote the project. This association enabled him to meet a number of experts.

In 2005, Mehdi Tayoubi and Richard Breitner from Dassault Systèmes invited him to join a new sponsorship programme “Passion For Innovation”. Together, they decided to examine the theory in the light of Dassault Systèmes's industrial and scientific 3D solutions.

Using software applications such as CATIA to reconstitute the site of this gigantic construction in three dimensions allowed them to test in real-time whether such an approach was plausible. In order to explain and communicate it, Tayoubi and his team used 3D technology as a teaching medium and proposed an interactive voyage through time in three dimensions. This was presented both on the giant screen of La Géode (a famous hemispheric theater in Paris), and on the Internet.

Also in 2005, a project was initiated to analyse the cracks in the King's Chamber of the pyramid. The group consisted of Houdin, the Egyptologist Bob Brier, Tayoubi, Breitner, and a team of engineers from Dassault Systèmes. Their choice of software tools such as SIMULIA, are normally used by industrial corporations to simulate the behaviour of their products in operation, and to detect any structural weaknesses in order to solve problems as early as the products' design phase.

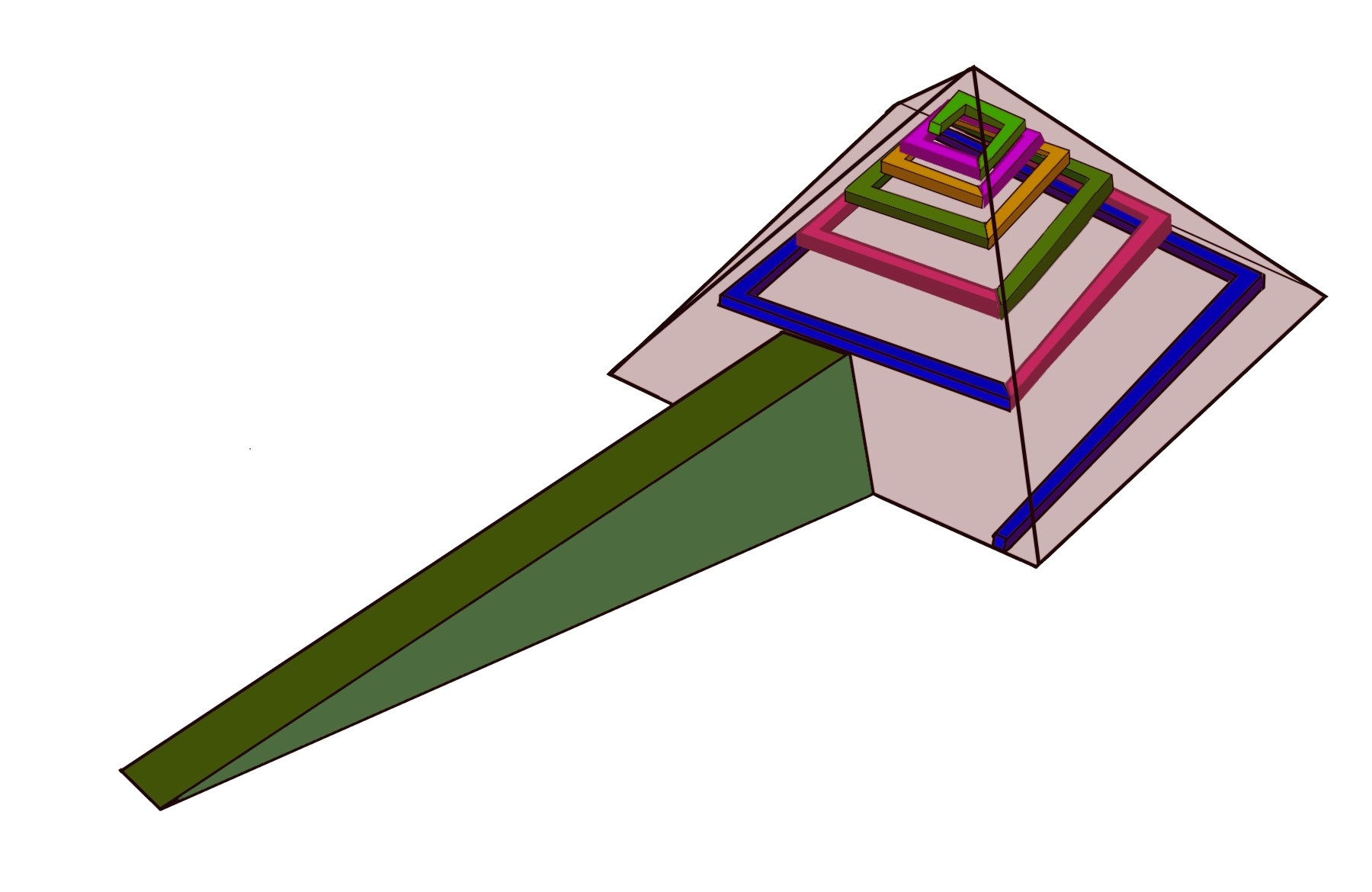
External and internal ramp

Their scheme involves the use of a regular external ramp to build the first 30% of the pyramid, with an internal ramp taking stones up beyond that height. The stones of the external ramp are re-cycled into the upper stories, thus explaining the otherwise puzzling lack of evidence for ramps.

After 4 years working alone, Houdin was joined by a team of engineers from the French 3D software company Dassault Systèmes, who used the most modern computer-aided design technology available to further refine and test the hypothesis, making it (according to Houdin) the only one proven to be a viable technique. Houdin published his theory in the books Khufu: The Secrets Behind the Building of the Great Pyramid in 2006 and The Secret of the Great Pyramid, co-written in 2008 with Egyptologist Bob Brier.

In Houdin's method, each ramp inside the pyramid ended at an open space, a notch temporarily left open in the edge of the construction. This 10-square-meter clear space housed a crane that lifted and rotated each 2.5-ton block, to ready it for eight men to drag up the next internal ramp. There is a notch of sorts in one of the right places, and in 2008 Houdin's co-author Bob Brier, with a National Geographic film crew, entered a previously unremarked chamber that could be the start of one of these internal ramps. In 1986 a member of the French team (see below) saw a desert fox at this notch, rather as if it had ascended internally.

Houdin's thesis remains unproven and in 2007, UCL Egyptologist David Jeffreys described the internal spiral hypothesis as "far-fetched and horribly complicated", while Oxford University's John Baines, declared he was "suspicious of any theory that seeks to explain only how the Great Pyramid was built".

The team concluded that the pyramid’s architect, Hemiunu, concerned that the cracks imperiled the whole structure, had cut a tunnel into a sealed space above the burial chamber to assess the damage, and then had filled the cracks with plaster as a tell-tale that would indicate if they were widening. The beams held and the pyramid was completed.

== In popular culture ==
- In the 2017 video game Assassin's Creed Origins, a tour of the Great Pyramid of Giza based on Jean-Pierre Houdin's internal ramp theory is offered.

== Bibliography ==
- Houdin, Jean-Pierre (2006). Khufu: The Secrets Behind the Building of the Great Pyramid. Farid Atiya Press. ISBN 978-977-17-3061-3.
- Brier, Bob; Houdin, Jean-Pierre (2008). The Secret of the Great Pyramid: How One Man's Obsession Led to the Solution of Ancient Egypt's Greatest Mystery. Collins. ISBN 978-0-06-165552-4.
