= Hiroyuki K.M. Tanaka =

Pioneer in muography

Hiroyuki K.M. Tanaka or Hiroyuki Tanaka is a Japanese physicist. and inventor. Tanaka is a pioneer in the field of muography which was also coined by him. His inventions include muometric navigation.

== Career ==
=== Muon tomography works ===
Tanaka pioneered the technique to image volcanoes with cosmic muons and is the most published author as of 2022 in this topic. He was also the initiator of the use of muography for the ScanPyramids mission. Tanaka and his team exploited the unique properties of cosmic rays to map the interiors of hard-to-access places such as volcanoes, the core of nuclear reactors, and pyramids. He was interested in "x-raying" the throat of a volcano with cosmic muons. In 2007, he led a team of scientists to install a muon detector near the summit of a volcano. By measuring muons traveling nearly horizontally through the volcano, the density of the volcano's innards was determined, and provided the first demonstration that magma and voids within the volcano could be detected with this technique. Tanaka has used muography to predict volcanic eruptions at an active volcano called Sakurajima, as well as to image ancient tombs, dams, and industrial furnaces. In 2013, he succeeded in creating a video from time-lapse images captured magma motion over the course of several days. In 2016, he x-rayed a volcano from the sky using a helicopter to fly the detectors around the volcano.

In May 2023, in an interview in elDiario.es, he explains "If you hide a coin behind a sheet of paper, under normal circumstances you wouldn't see it, but if you put it against the sun you see the shadow of the coin. Light is energetic enough to pass through a sheet of paper, but it cannot penetrate a pyramid. Cosmic muons are more penetrating, so muography allows us to image shadows through much thicker objects".

In 2022, he expanded muography to image targets in the atmosphere and the ocean. First, Tanaka set his sights on tropical cyclones and measured the muon flux before the storm arrived. He showed the cyclone's cross sections and revealed variations in density to provide information on wind speed and storm strength. Tanaka commented "We may be able to design a completely new kind of cyclone forecast system " in an interview in IEEE Spectrum in July 2023. This appears to be the first time that anyone has made 3-D muon scans of the insides of a storm to remotely monitor the behavior of cyclones approaching coastal regions. In 2022, Tanaka proposed undersea muon detectors to monitor variations in water depth to forecast storm surges without experiencing physical abrasion as there are no moving parts.

In the same year (2022), Tanaka has used muography to measure meteotsunamis, another hazard linked to cyclones. Tanaka's research group together with NEC Corporation were the first in the world to measure the muon flux under the seafloor. An array of detectors called the Tokyo Bay Seafloor Hyper-Kilometric Submarine Deep Detector (TS-HKMSDD) were installed in the underwater section of the Tokyo Bay Aqua-Line to capture meteotsunami induced by Typhoon Mindulle which reached a height of 15 cm and decayed within a few hours. In a May 2022 Eos (magazine) interview, Tanaka explained "it [muography] can detect offshore tides." He also remarked in a July 2023 Physics World interview "We want to know before the meteotsunami hits land." This HKMSDD system in Japan detected the wave height deviation generated by the 2022 Hunga Tonga–Hunga Haʻapai eruption and tsunami in 2022.

=== Muometric navigation works ===
Tanaka founded the field of muometric navigation with his invention called the muometric positioning system (muPS)in 2020. This is a new kind of GPS using muons which works underground, indoors, and underwater even when obstructed by obstacles like rocks, water, and buildings. It took He has been trying for several years to create this system to geolocate an object underground, underwater or inside a building. Tanaka explains "Cosmic muons are not intercepted like radio waves, making the technique suitable for universal indoor or underground navigation." After the initial wired system, Tanaka invented a new wireless version system called MuWNS capable of conducting autonomous operation in places like underground tunnels, which has never been possible with conventional technology. Tanaka and his team demonstrated that MuWNS can perform at an accuracy of 1–10 m., and the size of the receiver could be miniaturized to a chip scale and installed in smartphones in the future. He also plans to improve positioning accuracy of MuWNS.

In 2022, Tanaka began work to improve wireless time synchronization with cosmic rays by developing the Cosmic Time Synchronizer and the Cosmic Time Calibrator, capable of providing stable and accurate time synchronization without a GPS signal input. In a May 2022 interview for ScienceAlert, Tanaka compared this to the development of the lightbulb saying "Thomas Edison lit up Manhattan starting with a single light bulb. Perhaps we should take that approach, starting with a city block, then a district, and eventually we'll synchronize the whole of Tokyo and beyond.". According to an article in the National Tribune, Cosmic Time Synchronizer could bring accurate timing abilities to remote sensing stations, or even underwater, places that other methods cannot operate.

Tanaka applied cosmic-ray wireless time synchronization to wireless security, and named this technique Cosmic Coding and Transfer (COSMOCAT). He claims that the new scheme is more secure than other cryptosystems because this hardware random number generator does not require the sender and receiver of a message to exchange a key (cryptography). Tanaka has also expanded his COSMOCAT system to include a secured key storage system called Cosmic Coding and Transfer Storage (COSMOCATS). Tanaka commented in an interview in El País in February 2023, "If we dispense with this key-sharing idea and instead find a way to use unpredictable random numbers to encrypt information, the system might be immune"

== Views ==
=== On innovation ===
In April 2022, in interviewed by Science News, Tanaka stated "particles arriving from the universe have not been applied to our regular lives." He is trying to change that

Tanaka believes the university has an important role in the progress of new areas of research. He said "However, in the future there will be a stronger public interest in how research can lead to resolving the issues that modern society faces.". He pursues strategies to help with the creation of new industries based on research results, and training young technical experts acting at the forefront of corporations and other organizations"

=== On collaboration ===
When commemorating the establishment of a new research center for investigating muography, Tanaka said "it marks the first joint scientific effort between Hungary and Japan. Hungary has a rich scientific history, which makes this venture both significant and exciting."

Federico Iacobucci, pianist, composer and conductor resident in Tokyo, who as a Conservatory student also had the fortune of knowing the Maestro Ennio Morricone personally, stated "Tanaka is also a great expert in classical music. Tanaka is also a great music lover and a relationship of profound dialogue was born between us."
