= Mehdi Tayoubi =

Mehdi Tayoubi is Strategy and Innovation Vice-President at Dassault Systèmes (a subsidiary of the Dassault Group), and an employee since 2001. He is the co-director of the ScanPyramids mission launched in 2015 and co-founder of the HIP (Heritage Innovation Preservation) Institute. In November 2017, he was a co-author with the ScanPyramids team, in the journal Nature, of "Discovery of a big void in Khufu's Pyramid by observation of cosmic-ray muons". The team revealed their third discovery named ScanPyramids Big Void thanks to muography.
