= Herodotus Machine =

Mechanism used to build Ancient Egyptian pyramids according to Herodotus

The Herodotus Machine was a machine described by Herodotus. According to Herodotus, this invention enabled the ancient Egyptians to construct the pyramids by allowing workers to lift heavy building materials. Herodotus is believed to have encountered the device while traveling through Egypt. With limited reference and no true schematics, this machine has stimulated many historians' theories of how the ancient Egyptians were able to create pyramids.

== Herodotus in Egypt ==
Herodotus is suspected of having embellished – or made up entirely – some of his historical accounts, but scholars generally accept this particular account as Herodotus provides otherwise reasonable accounts of Egypt; further, it would have been quite possible for someone living in Halicarnassus to safely and easily travel to Egypt during Herodotus' lifetime. Trade existed between the Greek City States and the kingdom of Egypt. In Egypt Herodotus is thought to have conversed with locals on the matter.

=== Herodotus' description ===
Herodotus provides a description of the process in Histories.

The pyramid was built in steps, battlement-wise, as it is called, or, according to others, altar-wise. After laying the stones for the base, they raised the remaining stones to their places by means of machines formed of short wooden planks. The first machine raised them from the ground to the top of the first step. On this there was another machine, which received the stone upon its arrival and conveyed it to the second step, whence a third machine advanced it still higher. Either they had as many machines as there were steps in the pyramid, or possibly they had but a single machine, which, being easily moved, was transferred from tier to tier as the stone rose – both accounts are given and therefore I mention both. The upper portion of the Pyramid was finished first, then the middle and finally the part which was lowest and nearest to the ground.

== Leonardo's machine ==
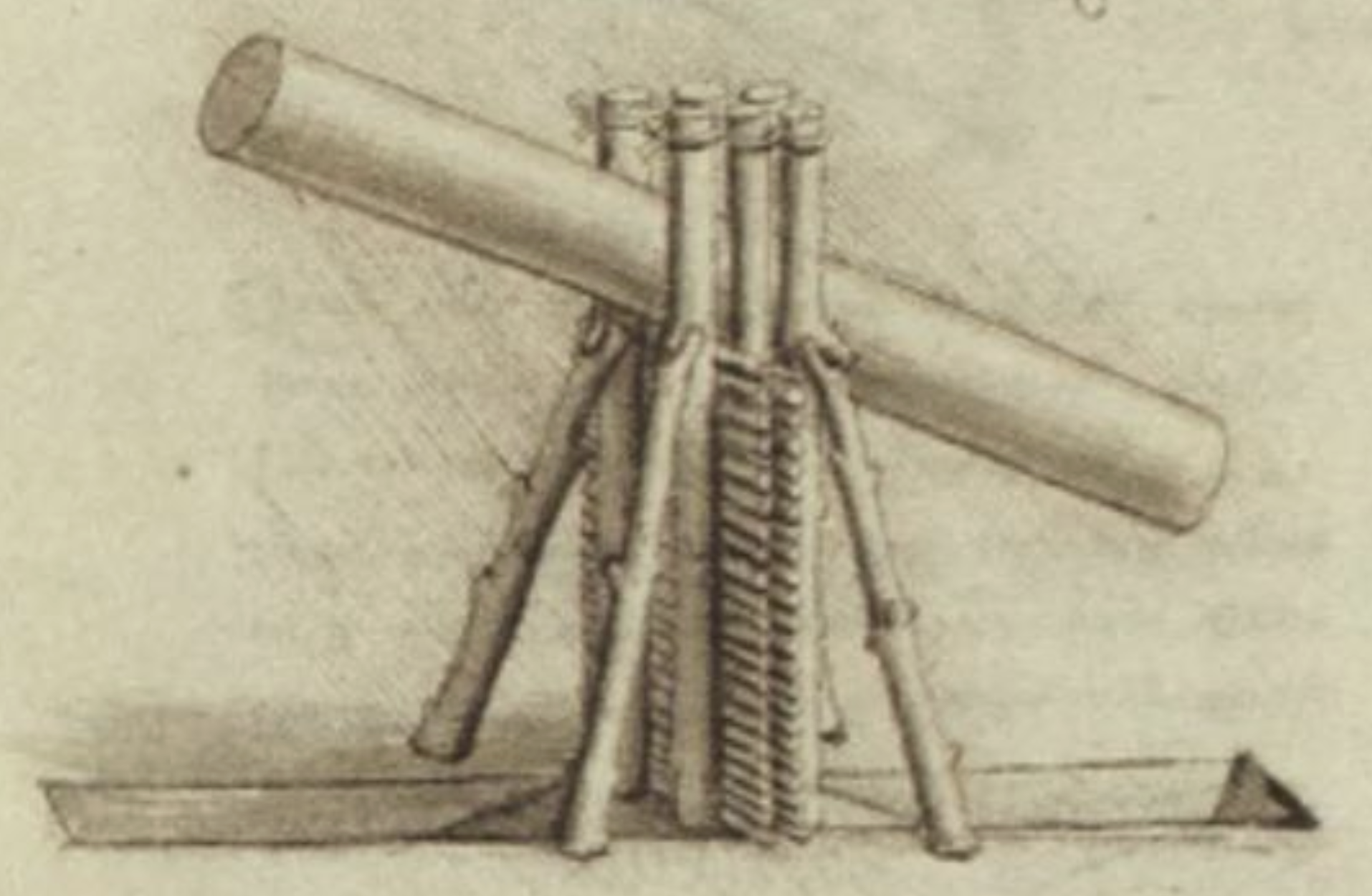
A lifting machine by Leonardo da Vinci (from the page f.29r of the Madrid I Codex)

Leonardo da Vinci is believed to have sketched a machine based on Herodotus' description (in f.818v of the Codex Atlanticus and f.29r of the Madrid I Codex). Gabriele Niccolai describes Leonardo's machine as follows:

[A very large stone] swings to the other side of the central fulcrum, creating enough space to insert a short plank underneath it. It is then swung back again to the opposite side, creating enough space to insert another wooden plank. The operation is repeated several times until the [stone] is lifted to the desired height.

Later depictions are premised upon da Vinci's sketches in the Codex Madrid. Visual depictions cannot authoritatively claim to represent Herodotus' machine.

== See also ==
- Egyptian pyramid construction techniques
- Histories
- Shadoof - a simple lifting tool known to be used in Ancient Egypt in agriculture.
