= Muon tomography =

Tomography technique based on high-energy muon particles

Muon tomography or muography is a technique that uses cosmic ray muons to generate two or three-dimensional images of volumes using information contained in the Coulomb scattering of the muons. Since muons are much more deeply penetrating than X-rays, muon tomography can be used to image through much thicker material than x-ray based tomography such as CT scanning. The muon flux at the Earth's surface is such that a single muon passes through an area the size of a human hand per second.

Since its development in the 1950s, muon tomography has taken many forms, the most important of which are muon transmission radiography and muon scattering tomography. Since 2010s researchers are also exploring and attempting to use artificially generated muons—created by conventional accelerators or laser-plasma systems—for muon tomography.

Muography uses muons by tracking the number of muons that pass through the target volume to determine the density of the inaccessible internal structure. Muography is a technique similar in principle to radiography (imaging with X-rays) but capable of surveying much larger objects. Since muons are less likely to interact, stop and decay in low density matter than high density matter, a larger number of muons will travel through the low density regions of target objects in comparison to higher density regions. The apparatus records the trajectory of each event to produce a muogram that displays the matrix of the resulting numbers of transmitted muons after they have passed through objects up to multiple kilometers in thickness. The internal structure of the object, imaged in terms of density, is displayed by converting muograms to muographic images.

Muon tomography imagers are under development for the purposes of detecting nuclear material in road transport vehicles and cargo containers for the purposes of non-proliferation. Another application is the usage of muon tomography to monitor potential underground sites used for carbon sequestration.

== Etymology and use ==
The term muon tomography is based on the word "tomography", a word produced by combining Ancient Greek tomos "cut" and graphe "drawing." The technique produces cross-sectional images (not projection images) of large-scaled objects that cannot be imaged with conventional radiography. Some authors hence see this modality as a subset of muography.

Muography was named by Hiroyuki K. M. Tanaka. There are two explanations for the origin of the word "muography": (A) a combination of the elementary particle muon and Greek γραφή (graphé) "drawing," together suggesting the meaning "drawing with muons"; and (B) a shortened combination of "muon" and "radiography." Although these techniques are related, they differ in that radiography uses X-rays to image the inside of objects on the scale of meters, while muography uses muons to image the inside of objects on the scale of hectometers to kilometers.

== Invention of muography ==
=== Precursor technologies ===
Twenty years after Carl David Anderson and Seth Neddermeyer discovered that muons were generated from cosmic rays in 1936, Australian physicist E.P. George made the first known attempt to measure the areal density of the rock overburden of the Guthega-Munyang tunnel (part of the Snowy Mountains Hydro-Electric Scheme) with cosmic ray muons. He used a Geiger counter. Although he succeeded in measuring the areal density of rock overburden placed above the detector, and even successfully matched the result from core samples, due to the lack of directional sensitivity in the Geiger counter, imaging was impossible.

In a famous experiment in the 1960s, American physicist Luis Walter Alvarez used muon transmission imaging to search for hidden chambers in the Pyramid of Chephren in Giza, although none were found at the time; a later effort discovered a previously unknown void in the Great Pyramid. In all cases the information about the absorption of the muons was used as a measure of the thickness of the material crossed by the cosmic ray particles.

=== First muogram ===
The first muogram was produced in 1970 by a team led by Luis Walter Alvarez, who installed detection apparatus in the Belzoni Chamber of the Pyramid of Khafre to search for hidden rooms within the structure. He recorded the number of muons after they had passed through the Pyramid. With an invention of this particle tracking technique, he worked out the methods to generate the muogram as a function of muon's arriving angles. The generated muogram was compared with the results of the computer simulations, and he concluded that there were no hidden chambers in the Pyramid of Chephren after the apparatus was exposed to the Pyramid for several months.

=== Film muography ===
Tanaka and Niwa's pioneering work created film muography, which uses nuclear emulsion. Film muography enabled them to obtain the first interior imaging of an active volcano in 2007, revealing the structure of the magma pathway of Asama volcano. Exposures of nuclear emulsions were taken in the direction of the volcano and then analyzed with a newly invented scanning microscope, custom built for the purpose of identifying particle tracks more efficiently.

=== Real-time muography ===
In 1968, the group of Alvarez used spark chambers with a digital read out for their Pyramid experiment. Tracking data from the apparatus was onto magnetic tape in the Belzoni Chamber, then the data were analyzed by the IBM 1130 computer, and later by the CDC 6600 computer located at Ein Shams University and Lawrence Radiation Laboratory, respectively. Strictly speaking these were not real time measurements.

Real-time muography requires muon sensors to convert the muon's kinetic energy into a number of electrons in order to process muon events as electronic data rather than as chemical changes on film. Electronic tracking data can be processed almost instantly with an adequate computer processor; in contrast, film muography data have to be developed before the muon tracks can be observed. Real-time tracking of muon trajectories produce real-time muograms that would be difficult or impossible to obtain with film muography.

=== High-resolution muography ===
The MicroMegas detector has a positioning resolution of 0.3 mm, an order of magnitude higher than that of the scintillator-based apparatus (10 mm), and thus has a capability to create better angular resolution for muograms.

== Applications ==
=== Geology ===
Muons have been used to image magma chambers to predict volcanic eruptions. Kanetada Nagamine et al. continue active research into the prediction of volcanic eruptions through cosmic ray attenuation radiography. Minato used cosmic ray counts to radiograph a large temple gate. Emil Frlež et al. reported using tomographic methods to track the passage of cosmic rays muons through cesium iodide crystals for quality control purposes. All of these studies have been based on finding some part of the imaged material that has a lower density than the rest, indicating a cavity. Muon transmission imaging is the most suitable method for acquiring this type of information.

In 2021, Giovanni Leone and his group revealed that volcanic eruption frequency is related to the amount of volcanic material which moves through a near-surface conduit in an active volcano.

==== Mount Vesuvius ====
The Mu-Ray project has been using muography to image Vesuvius, famous for its eruption of 79 AD, which destroyed local settlements including Pompeii and Herculaneum. The Mu-Ray project is funded by the Istituto Nazionale di Fisica Nucleare (INFN, Italian National Institute for Nuclear Physics) and the Istituto Nazionale di Geofisica e Vulcanologia (Italian National Institute for Geophysics and Volcanology). The last time this volcano erupted was in 1944. The goal of this project is to "see" inside the volcano which is being developed by scientists in Italy, France, the US and Japan. This technology can be applied to volcanoes all around the world, to have a better understanding of when volcanoes will erupt.

==== Etna ====
The ASTRI SST-2M Project is using muography to generate the internal images of the magma pathways of Etna volcano. The last major eruption of 1669 caused widespread damage. Monitoring the magma flows with muography may help to predict the direction from which lava from future eruptions may emit.

From August 2017 to October 2019, time sequential muography imaging of the Etna edifice was conducted to study differences in density levels which would indicate interior volcanic activities. Some of the findings of this research were the following: imaging of a cavity formation prior to crater floor collapse, underground fracture identification, and imaging of the formation of a new vent in 2019 which became active and subsequently erupted.

==== Stromboli ====
The apparatuses use nuclear emulsions to collect data near Stromboli volcano. Recent emulsion scanning improvements developed during the course of the Oscillation Project with Emulsion tRacking Apparatus (OPERA experiment) led to film muography. Unlike other muography particle trackers, nuclear emulsion can acquire high angular resolution without electricity. An emulsion-based tracker has been collecting data at Stromboli since December 2011.

Over a period of 5 months in 2019, an experiment using nuclear emulsion muography was done at Stromboli volcano. Emulsion films were prepared in Italy and analyzed in Italy and Japan. The images revealed a low-density zone at the summit of the volcano which is thought to influence the stability of the "Sciara del Fuoco" slope (the source of many landslides).

==== Puy de Dôme ====
Since 2010, a muographic imaging survey has been conducted at the dormant volcano, Puy de Dôme, in France. It has been using the existing closed building structures located directly underneath the southern and eastern sides of the volcano for equipment testing and experiments. Preliminary muographs have revealed previously unknown density features at the top of Puy de Dôme that have been confirmed with gravimetric imaging.

A joint measurement was conducted by French and Italian research groups in 2013-2014 during which different strategies for improved detector designs were tested, particularly their capacities to reduce background noise.

==== Underground water monitoring ====
Muography has been applied to groundwater and saturation level monitoring for bedrock in a landslide area as a response to major rainfall events. The measurement results were compared with borehole groundwater level measurements and rock resistivity.

==== Glaciers ====
The applicability of muography to glacier studies was first demonstrated with a survey of the top portion of Aletch glacier located in the Central European Alps.

In 2017, a Japanese/Swiss collaboration conducted a larger scale muography imaging experiment based at Eiger Glacier to determine the bedrock geometry beneath active glaciers in the steep alpine environment of the Jungfrau region in Switzerland. 5-6 double side coated emulsion films were set in frames with stainless steel plates for shielding to be installed in 3 regions of a railway tunnel which was located underneath the targeted glacier. Production of the emulsion films was done in Switzerland and analysis was done in Japan.

Underlying bedrock erosion and its boundary between glacier and bedrock could be successfully imaged for the first time. The methodology provided important information on subglacial mechanisms of bedrock erosion.

==== Mining ====
TRIUMF and its spin-off company Ideon Technologies developed a muograph designed specifically for surveys of possible uranium deposit sites with industry-standard boreholes

=== Civil engineering ===
Muography has been used to map the inside of big civil engineering structures, such as dams, and their surroundings for safety and risk prevention purposes. Muography imaging was applied to the identification of hidden construction shafts located above the Alfreton Old Tunnel (constructed in 1862) in the UK.

=== Nuclear reactors ===
Muography was applied to investigating the conditions of nuclear reactors damaged by the Fukushima nuclear disaster, and helped to confirm its state of near-complete meltdown.

==== Nuclear waste imaging ====
Tomographic techniques can be effective for non-invasive nuclear waste characterization and for nuclear material accountancy of spent fuel inside dry storage containers. Cosmic muons can improve the accuracy of data on nuclear waste and Dry Storage Containers (DSC). Imaging of DSC exceeds the IAEA detection target for nuclear material accountancy. In Canada, spent nuclear fuel is stored in large pools (fuel bays or wet storage) for a nominal period of 10 years to allow for sufficient radioactive cooling.

Challenges and issues for nuclear waste characterization are covered at great length, summarized below:

- Historical waste. Non-traceable waste stream poses a challenge for characterization. Different types of waste can be distinguished: tanks with liquids, fabrication facilities to be decontaminated before decommissioning, interim waste storage sites, etc.
- Some waste form may be difficult and/or impossible to measure and characterize (i.e. encapsulated alpha/beta emitters, heavily shielded waste).
- Direct measurements, i.e. destructive assay, are not possible in many cases and Non-Destructive Assay (NDA) techniques are required, which often do not provide conclusive characterization.
- Homogeneity of the waste needs characterization (i.e. sludge in tanks, in-homogeneities in cemented waste, etc.).
- Condition of the waste and waste package: breach of containment, corrosion, voids, etc.

Accounting for all of these issues can take a great deal of time and effort. Muon Tomography can be useful to assess the characterization of waste, radiation cooling, and condition of the waste container.

==== Los Alamos Concrete Reactor ====
In the summer of 2011, a reactor mockup was imaged using Muon Mini Tracker (MMT) at Los Alamos. The MMT consists of two muon trackers made up of sealed drift tubes. In the demonstration, cosmic-ray muons passing through a physical arrangement of concrete and lead; materials similar to a reactor were measured. The mockup consisted of two layers of concrete shielding blocks, and a lead assembly in between; one tracker was installed at 2.5 metres (8 ft 2 in) height, and another tracker was installed on the ground level at the other side. Lead with a conical void similar in shape to the melted core of the Three Mile Island reactor was imaged through the concrete walls. It took three weeks to accumulate 8×10^{4} muon events. The analysis was based on point of closest approach, where the track pairs were projected to the mid-plane of the target, and the scattered angle was plotted at the intersection. This test object was successfully imaged, even though it was significantly smaller than expected at Fukushima Daiichi for the proposed Fukushima Muon Tracker (FMT).

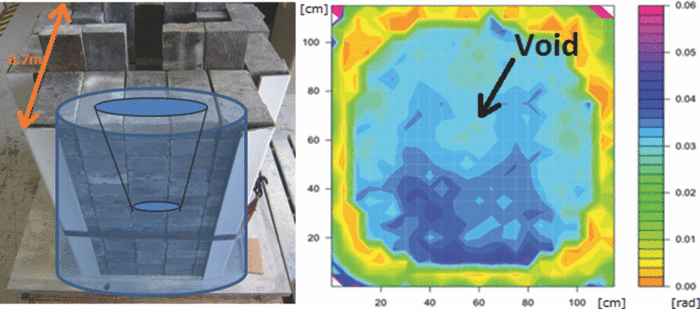
Left – Lead reactor core with conic void. Right – Observed core where average scattering angles of muons are plotted. The void in the core is clearly imaged through two 2.74 metres (9 ft 0 in) concrete walls. The lead core of 0.7 metres (2 ft 4 in) thickness gives an equivalent radiation length to the uranium fuel in Unit 1, and gives a similar scattering angle. Hot spots at the corners are artifacts caused by edge effect of MMT.

==== Fukushima application ====
The March 11, 2011 Tōhoku earthquake and tsunami caused an ongoing nuclear crisis at the Fukushima Daiichi power plant. Though the reactors are stabilized, complete shutdown will require knowledge of the extent and location of the damage to the reactors. A cold shutdown was announced by the Japanese government in December, 2011, and a new phase of nuclear cleanup and decommissioning was started. However, it is hard to plan the dismantling of the reactors without any realistic estimate of the extent of the damage to the cores, and knowledge of the location of the melted fuel. Since the radiation levels are still very high inside the reactor core, it is not possible for manual assessment of the damage. The Fukushima Daiichi Tracker (FDT) is proposed to see the extent of the damage from a safe distance. A few months of measurements with muon tomography will show the distribution of the reactor core. From that, a plan can be devices for reactor dismantlement; thus potentially shortening the time of the project by many years.

In August 2014, Decision Sciences International Corporation announced it had been awarded a contract by Toshiba Corporation (Toshiba) to support the reclamation of the Fukushima Daiichi Nuclear complex with the use of Decision Science's muon tracking detectors. This is an example in reactor inspection. It was used to locate the nuclear fuel in the Fukushima Daiichi nuclear power plant, which was damaged by the 9.0-magnitude earthquake, followed by a tsunami.

=== Non-proliferation ===
The Nuclear Non-proliferation Treaty (NPT) signed in 1968 was a major step in the non-proliferation of nuclear weapons. Under the NPT, non-nuclear weapon states were prohibited from, among other things, possessing, manufacturing or acquiring nuclear weapons or other nuclear explosive devices. All signatories, including nuclear weapon states, were committed to the goal of total nuclear disarmament.

The Comprehensive Nuclear-Test-Ban Treaty (CTBT) bans all nuclear explosions in any environments. Tools such as muon tomography can help to stop the spread of nuclear material before it is armed into a weapon.

The New START treaty signed by the US and Russia aims to reduce the nuclear arsenal by as much as a third. The verification involves a number of logistically and technically difficult problems. New methods of warhead imaging are of crucial importance for the success of mutual inspections.

Muon tomography can be used for treaty verification due to many important factors. It is a passive method; it is safe for humans and will not apply an artificial radiological dose to the warhead. Cosmic rays are much more penetrating than gamma or x-rays. Warheads can be imaged in a container behind significant shielding and in presence of clutter. Exposure times depend on the object and detector configuration (~few minutes if optimized). While special nuclear material (SNM) detection can be reliably confirmed, and discrete SNM objects can be counted and localized, the system can be designed to not reveal potentially sensitive details of the object design and composition.

The Multi-Mode Passive Detection System (MMPDS) port scanner, located in the Freeport, Bahamas can detect both shielded nuclear material, as well as explosives and contraband. The scanner is large enough for a cargo container to pass through, making it a scaled-up version of the Mini Muon Tracker. It then produces a three-dimensional image of what is scanned.

Tools such as the MMPDS can be used to prevent the spread of nuclear weapons. The safe but effective use of cosmic rays can be implemented in ports to help non-proliferation efforts, or even in cities, under overpasses, or entrances to government buildings.

=== Archaeology ===
==== Egyptian pyramids ====
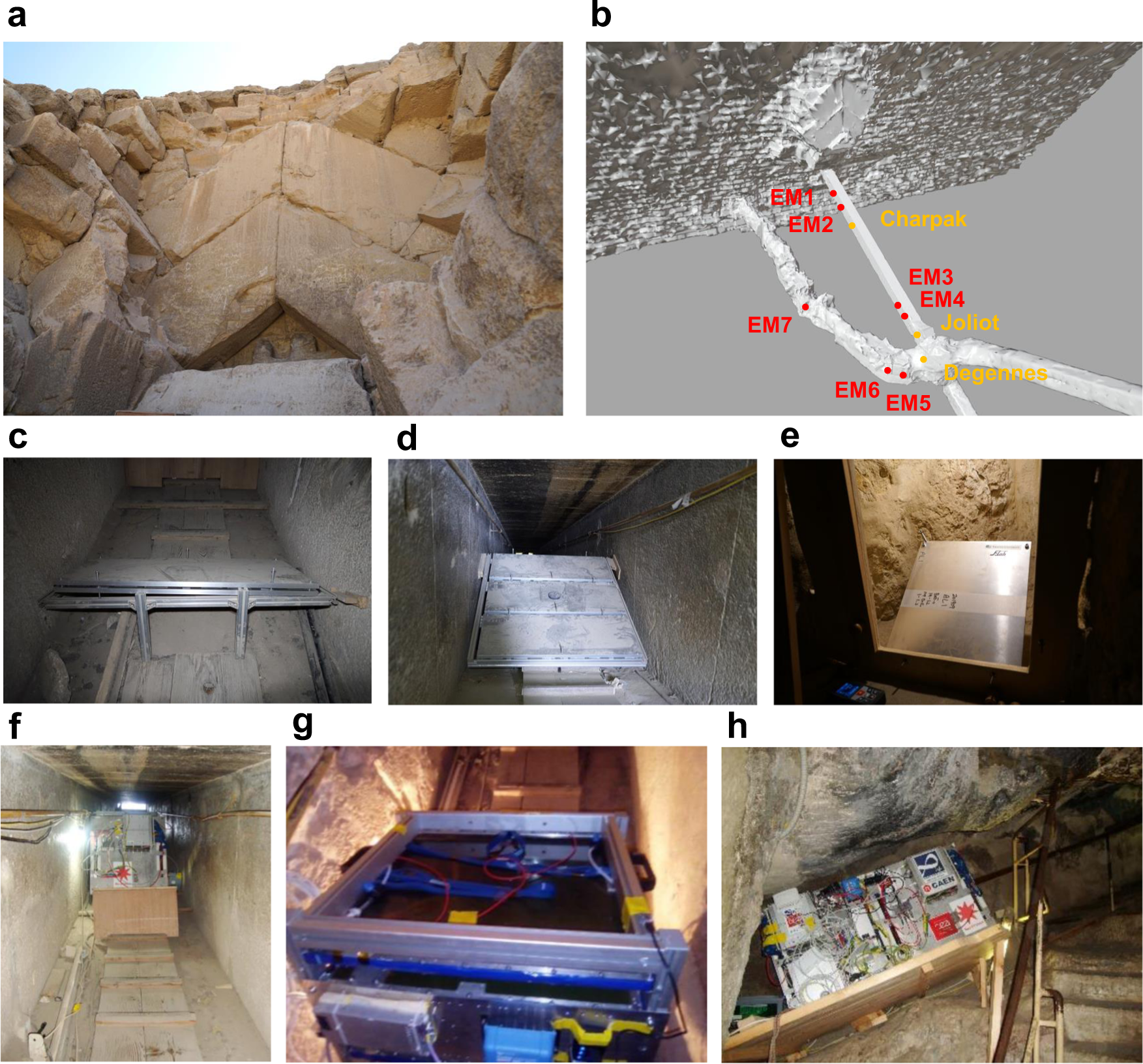
Detectors installed in the descending corridor (DC) and in the al-Ma'mun corridor (MC). a The Chevron, which consists of huge gabled limestone beams, covering the original entrance to the DC on the North side of Khufu's Pyramid. b 3D model and positions of the detectors from Nagoya University, indicated by red dots and of the detectors from CEA, indicated by orange dots, in the DC and in the MC. c–h The detectors. c shows EM3, d shows EM2, e shows EM5, f shows Charpak, g shows Joliot and h shows Degennes.

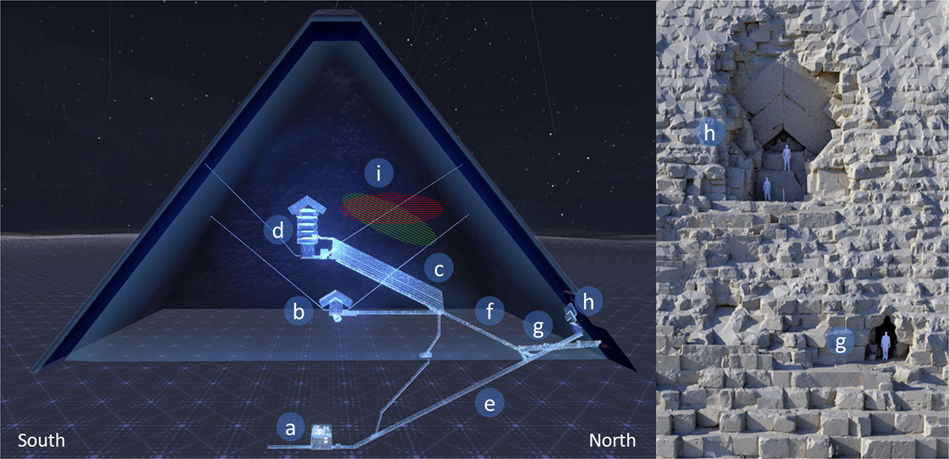
East-West cut view of the Great Pyramid and front view of the North face Chevron area. a Subterranean chamber, b queen's chamber, c grand gallery, d king's chamber, e descending corridor, f ascending corridor, g al-Ma'mun corridor, h north face Chevron area, i ScanPyramids Big Void with horizontal hypothesis (red hatching) and inclined hypothesis (green hatching) as published in November 2017.

In 2015, 45 years after Alvarez's experiment, the ScanPyramids Project, which is composed of an international team of scientists from Egypt, France, Canada, and Japan, started using muography and thermography imaging techniques to survey the Giza pyramid complex. In 2017, scientists involved in the project discovered a large cavity, named "ScanPyramids Big Void", above the Grand Gallery of the Great Pyramid of Giza. In 2023, "a corridor-shaped structure" was found in Khufu's Pyramid using the cosmic-ray muons. It was named "ScanPyramids North Face Corridor".

==== Mexican pyramids ====
The 3rd largest pyramid in the world, the Pyramid of the Sun, situated near Mexico City in the ancient city of Teotihuacan was surveyed with muography. One of the motivations of the team was to discover if inaccessible chambers inside the Pyramid might hold the tomb of a Teotihuacan ruler. The apparatus was transported in components and then reassembled inside a small tunnel leading to an underground chamber directly underneath the pyramid. A low density region approximately 60 meters wide was reported as a preliminary result, which has led some researchers to suggest that the structure of the pyramid might have been weakened and it is in danger of collapse.

In 2020, the US National Science Foundation awarded a US-Mexico international group a grant for muography to investigate El Castillo, the largest pyramid in Chichen Itza.

==== Mt. Echia ====
A three-dimensional muography experiment was done in the underground tunnels of Mt Echia (in Naples, Italy) with 2 muon detectors, MU-RAY and MIMA, which successfully imaged 2 known cavities and discovered one unknown cavity. Mt Echia is where the earliest Naples settlement started in the 8th century and is located underground. Using measurements from 3 different locations in the underground tunnels, a 3D reconstruction was created for the unknown cavity. The method used for this experiment could be applied to other archeological targets to check the structural integrity of ancient sites and to potentially discover hidden historical regions within known sites.

==== China's imperial chambers ====
Yuanyuan Liu of the Beijing Normal University and her group showed the feasibility of muography to image the underground chamber of the first emperor of China.

==== City of David archeological site ====
Archeologists and High Energy Physicists associated with Tel Aviv University announced in August 2025 that they had developed a system of muon tomography that allowed them to visualize hollows in the City of David archeological site without unburying them.

=== Planetary science ===
==== Mars ====
Muography may potentially be implemented to image extraterrestrial objects such as the geology of Mars. Cosmic rays are numerous and omnipresent in outer space. Therefore, it is predicted that the interaction of the cosmic rays in the Earth's atmosphere to generate pions/mesons and subsequently to decay into muons also occurs in the atmosphere of other planets. It has been calculated that the atmosphere of Mars is sufficient to produce a horizontal muon flux for practical muography, roughly equivalent to the Earth's muon flux. In the future, it may be viable to include a high-resolution muography apparatus in a future space mission to Mars, for instance inside a Mars rover. Getting accurate images of the density of Martian structures could be used for surveying sources of ice or water.

==== Small Solar System bodies ====
The "NASA Innovative Advanced Concepts (NIAC) program" is now in the process of assessing whether muography may be used for imaging the density structures of small Solar System bodies (SSBs). While the SSBs tend to generate lower muon flux than the Earth's atmosphere, some are sufficient to allow for muography of objects ranging from 1 km or less in diameter. The program includes calculating the muon flux for each potential target, creating imaging simulations and considering the engineering challenges of building a more lightweight, compact apparatus appropriate for such a mission.

=== Hydrospheric muography ===
The Hyper-kilometric Submarine Deep Detector (HKMSDD) was designed as a technique to operate muographic observations autonomously under the sea at reasonable costs by combining linear arrays of muographic sensor modules with underwater tube structures.

In undersea muography, time-dependent mass movements consisting of or within targeted gigantic fluid bodies and submerged solid material bodies can be more precisely imaged than with land-based muography. Time-dependent fluctuations of the muon flux due to atmospheric pressure variations are suppressed when muography is conducted under the seafloor by the "inverse barometric effect (IBE)" of seawater. Low atmospheric pressures, such as the pressures observed at the center of a cyclone suck up seawater; on the other hand, high atmospheric pressures will push down seawater. The muon's barometric pressure fluctuation, therefore, are mostly compensated by IBE at sea levels.

=== Carbon capture and storage ===
The success of carbon capture and storage (CCS) hinges upon being able to reliably contain the materials within the storage containers. It has been proposed to use muography as a monitoring tool for CCS. In 2018, a 2 month study supported the feasibility of CCS muography monitoring. It was completed in the UK at the Boulby Mine site in a 1.1 kilometres (3,600 ft) deep borehole.

=== Commercialization of muon tomography ===
The commercialization of muon tomography is a growing field, primarily utilizing naturally occurring cosmic-ray muons for large-scale imaging. Since 2000s companies around the world are adapting this particle physics technique for various industrial applications. One of the earliest, Decision Sciences International Corporation focuses heavily on security applications, which employs muon scattering tomography to scan large cargo containers and vehicles for shielded nuclear threats and other contraband.

Canadian firm Ideon Technologies specializes in subsurface intelligence for mineral exploration and mining. European companies like Estonia-UK GScan and Finland's Muon Solutions focus on non-destructive testing of civil infrastructure, for example, see the Structures Moonshot project by the UK National Highways and AtkinsRéalis. The UK-based company Geoptic is also active in infrastructure investigations. The Israeli company Lingacom works on muon-based imaging systems for both security and underground surveying. Other players, such as the UK-based Lynkeos Technology, have focused on specialized applications, like monitoring high-activity nuclear waste containers.

One of the first commercial developer in the artificial source space is MuRayTech, a spinout from GScan and DESY in Hamburg, Germany. Operating in Tallinn, Estonia; Hamburg, Germany; and Cambridge, UK, MuRayTech is specifically developing laser-plasma accelerator technology to create artificially generated muons on demand for precise muon tomography in industrial quality control and medical diagnostics.

== Technique variants ==
=== Muon scattering tomography (MST) ===
Muon scattering tomography was first proposed by Chris Morris and his group at Los Alamos National Laboratory (LANL). This technique is capable of locating the muon's Rutherford scattering source by tracking incoming and outgoing muons from the target. Since the radiation lengths tend to be shorter for higher atomic number materials; hence larger scattering angles are expected for the same path lengths, this technique is more sensitive to distinguishing differences between materials within structures and ~~is~~ therefore can be used for imaging heavy metals hidden inside light materials. On the other hand, this technique is not suitable for imaging void structures or light materials located inside heavy materials.

LANL and its spinoff company Decision Sciences applied the MST technique to image the interiors of large trucks and other storage containers in order to detect nuclear materials. A similar system that used MST was developed at the University of Glasgow and its spin-off company Lynkeos Technology to apply towards monitoring the robustness of nuclear waste containers at the Sellafield storage site.

With muon scattering tomography, both incoming and outgoing trajectories for each particle are reconstructed. This technique has been shown to be useful to find materials with high atomic number in a background of high-z material such as uranium or material with a low atomic number. Since the development of this technique at Los Alamos, a few different companies have started to use it for several purposes, most notably for detecting nuclear cargo entering ports and crossing over borders.

The Los Alamos National Laboratory team has built a portable Mini Muon Tracker (MMT). This muon tracker is constructed from sealed aluminum drift tubes, which are grouped into twenty-four 1.2-meter-square (4 ft) planes. The drift tubes measure particle coordinates in X and Y with a typical accuracy of several hundred micrometers. The MMT can be moved via a pallet jack or a fork lift. If a nuclear material has been detected it is important to be able to measure details of its construction in order to correctly evaluate the threat.

MT uses multiple scattering radiography. In addition to energy loss and stopping cosmic rays undergo Coulomb scattering. The angular distribution is the result of many single scatters. This results in an angular distribution that is Gaussian in shape with tails from large angle single and plural scattering. The scattering provides a novel method for obtaining radiographic information with charged particle beams. More recently, scattering information from cosmic ray muons has been shown to be a useful method of radiography for homeland security applications.

Multiple scattering can be defined as when the thickness increases and the number of interactions become high the angular dispersion can be modelled as Gaussian. Where the dominant part of the multiple scattering polar-angular distribution is

$\frac{\mathrm{d}N}{\mathrm{d}\theta}={\frac{1}{2 \pi \theta_0^2}}\,\exp{\left(-\frac{\theta^2}{2 \theta_0^2}\right)}.$

where θ is the muon scattering angle and θ_{0} is the standard deviation of scattering angle, is given approximately by

$\theta_0={\frac{14.1\,\mathrm{MeV}}{pc \beta}}\sqrt{\frac{X}{X_0}}.$

The muon momentum and velocity are p and β, respectively, c is the speed of light, X is the length of scattering medium, and X_{0} is the radiation length for the material. This needs to be convolved with the cosmic ray momentum spectrum in order to describe the angular distribution.

The Image can then be reconstructed by use of GEANT4. These runs include input and output vectors, $\vec{X}$ in and $\vec{X}$ out for each incident particle. The incident flux projected to the core location was used to normalize transmission radiography (attenuation method). From here the calculations are normalized for the zenith angle of the flux.

=== Muon Momentum Integrated Tomography System ===
Despite the various benefits of using cosmic ray muons for imaging large and dense objects, i.e., spent nuclear fuel casks and nuclear reactors, their wide applications are often limited by the naturally low muon flux at sea level, approximately 10,000 m^{−2}min^{−1}. To overcome this limitation, two important quantities—scattering angle, θ and momentum, p—for each muon event must be measured during the measurement. To measure cosmic ray muon momentum in the field, a fieldable muon spectrometer using multi-layer pressurized gas Cherenkov radiators has been developed and the muon spectrometer-tomography shows improved muon scattering tomography resolutions.

=== Muon computational axial tomography (Mu-CAT) ===
Mu-CAT is a technique which combines multiple projected muographic images to create a 3D muography image. In principle, it is similar to medical imaging used in radiology (CAT scans) to obtain three-dimensional internal images of the body. While medical CAT scanners use a rotating X-ray generator around the target object, Mu-CAT uses multiple detectors around the target object and naturally occurring muons as probes. Either the tomographic reconstruction technique or the inverse problem is applied to these data from the Mu-CAT observations to reconstruct 3d images.

Mu-CAT revealed the three-dimensional position of a fractured zone below the crater floor of an active volcano related to a past eruption that had caused a large pyroclastic and lava flow on its northern slope.

=== Cosmic Ray Inspection and Passive Tomography (CRIPT) ===
The Cosmic Ray Inspection and Passive Tomography (CRIPT) detector is a Canadian muon tomography project which tracks muon scattering events while simultaneously estimating the muon momentum. The CRIPT detector is 5.3 metres (17 ft) tall and has a mass of 22 tonnes (22 long tons; 24 short tons). The majority of the detector mass is located in the muon momentum spectrometer which is a feature unique to CRIPT regarding muon tomography.

After initial construction and commissioning at Carleton University in Ottawa, Canada, the CRIPT detector was moved to Atomic Energy Of Canada Limited's Chalk River Laboratories.

The CRIPT detector is presently examining the limitations on detection time for border security applications, limitations on muon tomography image resolution, nuclear waste stockpile verification, and space weather observation through muon detection.

== Technical aspects ==
The apparatus is a muon-tracking device that consists of muon sensors and recording media. There are several different kinds of muon sensors used in muography apparatuses: plastic scintillators, nuclear emulsions, or gaseous ionization detectors. The recording medium is the film itself, digital magnetic or electronic memory. The apparatus is directed towards the target volume, exposing the muon sensor until the muon events required in order to form a statistically sufficient muogram are recorded, after which, (post processing) a muograph displaying the average density along each muon path is created.

== Advantages ==
There are several advantages that muography has over traditional geophysical surveys. First, muons are naturally abundant and travel from the atmosphere towards the Earth's surface. This abundant muon flux is nearly constant, therefore muography can be used worldwide. Second, because of the high-contrast resolution of muography, a small void of less than 0.001% of the entire volume can be distinguished. Finally, the apparatus has much lower power requirements than other imaging techniques since they use natural probes, rather than relying on artificially generated signals.

== Process ==
In the field of muography, the transmission coefficient is defined as the ratio of the transmission through the object over the incident muon flux. By applying the muon's range through matter to the open-sky muon energy spectrum, the value of the fraction of incident muon flux that is transmitted through the object can be analytically derived. A muon with a different energy has a different range, which is defined as a distance that the incident muon can traverse in matter before it stops. For example, 1 TeV energy muons have a continuous slowing down approximation range (CSDA range) of 2500 m water equivalent (m.w.e.) in silica dioxide whereas the range is reduced to 400 m.w.e. for 100 GeV muons. This range varies if the material is different, e.g., 1 TeV muons have a CSDA range of 1500 m.w.e. in lead.

The numbers (or later colors) forming a muogram are displayed in terms of the transmitted number of muon events. Each pixel in the muogram is a two dimensional unit based on the angular resolution of the apparatus. The phenomenon that muography cannot differentiate density variations is called the "Volume Effects". Volume Effects happen when a large amount of low density materials and a thin layer of high density materials cause the same attenuation in muon flux. Therefore, in order to avoid false data arising from Volume Effects, the exterior shape of the volume has to be accurately determined and used for analyzing the data.
