= Construction of the Egyptian pyramids =

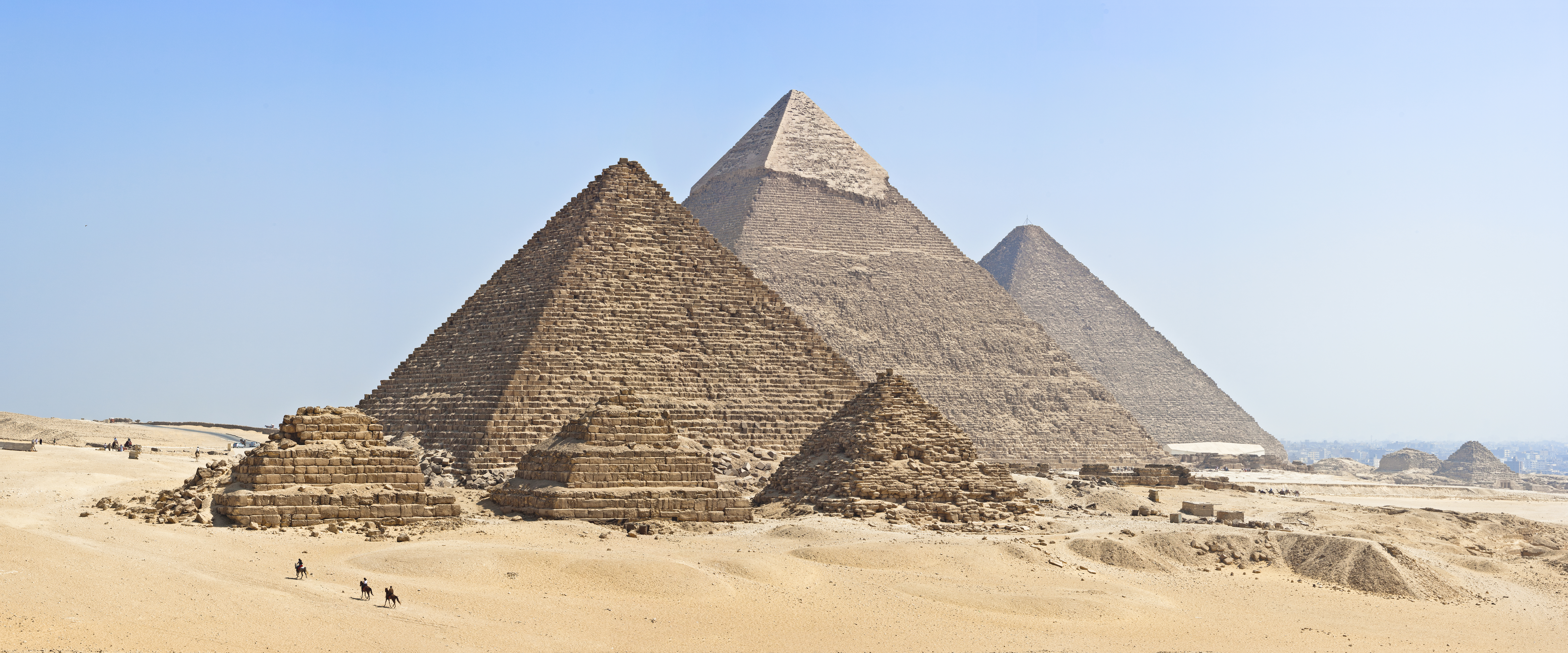
The three main pyramids at Giza, together with subsidiary pyramids and the remains of other ancient structures

The construction of the Egyptian pyramids can be explained with well-established scientific facts; however, there are some aspects that even today are considered controversial hypotheses. The construction techniques used seem to have developed over time; later pyramids were not constructed in the same way as earlier ones. It is believed that huge stones were carved from quarries with copper tools, and these blocks were then dragged and lifted into position. Disagreements chiefly concern the methods used to move and place the stones.

In addition to the many unresolved arguments about the construction techniques, there have been many disagreements as to the kind of workforce used. The Greeks, many years after the event, believed that the pyramids were built by slave labour. Archaeologists now believe that the Great Pyramid of Giza (at least) was built by tens of thousands of skilled workers who camped near the pyramids and worked for a salary or as a form of tax payment (corvée) until the construction was completed, pointing to workers' cemeteries discovered in 1990. For the Middle Kingdom pyramid of Amenemhat II, there is evidence from the annal stone of the king that foreigners from Canaan were employed.

The pseudoscientific field of pyramidology includes many archaeological fringe theories attempting to explain how the pyramids were built.

== Historical hypotheses ==
=== The Writing of Herodotus and Diodorus Siculus ===
The first historical accounts of the construction of these monuments came centuries after the era of pyramid construction, by Herodotus in the 5th century BC and Diodorus Siculus in the 1st century BC. Herodotus's account claims that the Egyptians used a machine (now referred to as the "Herodotus Machine"), stating:

This pyramid was made like stairs, which some call steps and others, tiers. When this, its first form, was completed, the workmen used short wooden logs as levers to raise the rest of the stones; they heaved up the blocks from the ground onto the first tier of steps; when the stone had been raised, it was set on another lever that stood on the first tier, and the lever again used to lift it from this tier to the next. It may be that there was a new lever on each tier of steps, or perhaps there was only one lever, quite portable, which they carried up to each tier in turn; I leave this uncertain, as both possibilities were mentioned. But this is certain, that the upper part of the pyramid was finished off first, then the next below it, and last of all the base and the lowest part.

Diodorus Siculus's account states:

And it's said the stone was transported a great distance from Arabia, and that the edifices were raised utilizing earthen ramps since machines for lifting had not yet been invented in those days; and most surprising it is, that although such large structures were raised in an area surrounded by sand, no trace remains of either ramps or the dressing of the stones, so that it seems not the result of the patient labour of men, but rather as if the whole complex were set down entire upon the surrounding sand by some god. Now Egyptians try to make a marvel of these things, alleging that the ramps were made of salt and natron and that, when the river was turned against them, it melted them clean away and obliterated their every trace without the use of human labour. But in truth, it most certainly was not done this way! Rather, the same multitude of workmen who raised the mounds returned the entire mass to its original place; for they say that three hundred and sixty thousand men were constantly employed in the prosecution of their work, yet the entire edifice was hardly finished at the end of twenty years.

Diodorus Siculus's description of the shipment of the stone from Arabia is correct since the term "Arabia" in those days implied the land between the Nile and the Red Sea where the limestone blocks have been transported from quarries across the river Nile.

=== Third through Fifth dynasties ===
During the earliest period, pyramids were constructed wholly of stone. Locally quarried limestone was the material of choice for the main body of these pyramids, while a higher quality of limestone quarried at Tura (near modern Cairo) was used for the outer casing. The limestone originated from different outcrops of the Eocene-aged Mokattam Formation. Granite, quarried near Aswan, was used to construct some architectural elements, including the portcullis (a type of gate) and the roofs and walls of the burial chamber. Occasionally, granite was used in the outer casing as well, such as in the Pyramid of Menkaure. In the early pyramids, the layers of stone (called courses) forming the pyramid body were laid sloping inwards; however, this configuration was abandoned in later pyramids. The Bent Pyramid at Dahshur seems to indicate acceptance of a new technique at a transition between these two building techniques. Its lower section is built of sloping courses while in its upper section the stones are laid horizontally.

=== Middle Kingdom and onward ===
During the Middle Kingdom, pyramid construction techniques changed again. Most pyramids built then were little more than mountains of mud-brick encased in a veneer of polished limestone. In several cases, later pyramids were built on top of natural hills to further reduce the volume of material needed in their construction. The materials and methods of construction used in the earliest pyramids have ensured their survival in a generally much better state of preservation than for the pyramid monuments of the later pharaohs.

=== Mortar ===
The stones forming the core of the pyramids were roughly cut, especially in the Great Pyramid. To fill the gaps, huge quantities of gypsum and rubble were needed. The filling has almost no binding properties, but it was necessary to stabilize the construction. To make the gypsum mortar, it had to be dehydrated by heating which requires large quantities of wood. According to Egyptologists, the findings of both the 1984 and 1995 David H. Koch Pyramids Radiocarbon Projects may suggest that Egypt had to strip its forest and scrap every bit of wood it had to build the pyramids of Giza and other even earlier 4th Dynasty pyramids. Carbon dating samples from core blocks and other materials revealed that dates from the 1984 study averaged 374 years earlier than currently accepted and the 1995 dating averaging 100–200 years. As suggested by team members, "We thought that it was unlikely that the pyramid builders consistently used centuries-old wood as fuel in preparing mortar. The 1984 results left us with too little data to conclude that the historical chronology of the Old Kingdom was wrong by nearly 400 years, but we considered this at least a possibility". Egyptologists propose that the old wood problem is responsible for the discrepancy, claiming the earlier dates were possibly derived from recycling large amounts of centuries-old wood and other earlier materials.

=== Arsenical copper ===
The main material used in the Old and Middle Kingdoms was so-called arsenical copper or bronze. It is more effective than copper with minor impurities, and can be made even harder by repeated hammering. Hundreds of artefacts from these periods were made of this material. All preserved copper alloy tools of the Old Kingdom era of pyramid builders were recently collected in a monograph. Its occurrence was also confirmed for the settlement material from Giza, from the reigns of Khufu and Khafre. Recent data from Middle Kingdom Elephantine Island indicate that this material was an intentionally produced alloy, and a result of rather complex technology.

== Quarrying ==
There is good information concerning the location of the quarries, some of the tools used to cut stone in the quarries, transportation of the stone to the monument, leveling the foundation, and leveling the subsequent tiers of the developing superstructure. Workmen probably used copper chisels, drills, and saws to cut softer stone, such as most of the limestone. The harder stones, such as granite, granodiorite, syenite, and basalt, cannot be cut with copper tools alone; instead, they were worked with time-consuming methods like pounding with dolerite, drilling, and sawing with the aid of an abrasive, such as quartz or corundum sand. This occurred in a process known as sand abrasion. Blocks were transported by sledge likely lubricated by water.

Leveling the foundation may have been accomplished by use of water-filled trenches as suggested by Mark Lehner and I. E. S. Edwards or through the use of a crude square level and experienced surveyors.

== Transport of stone blocks ==
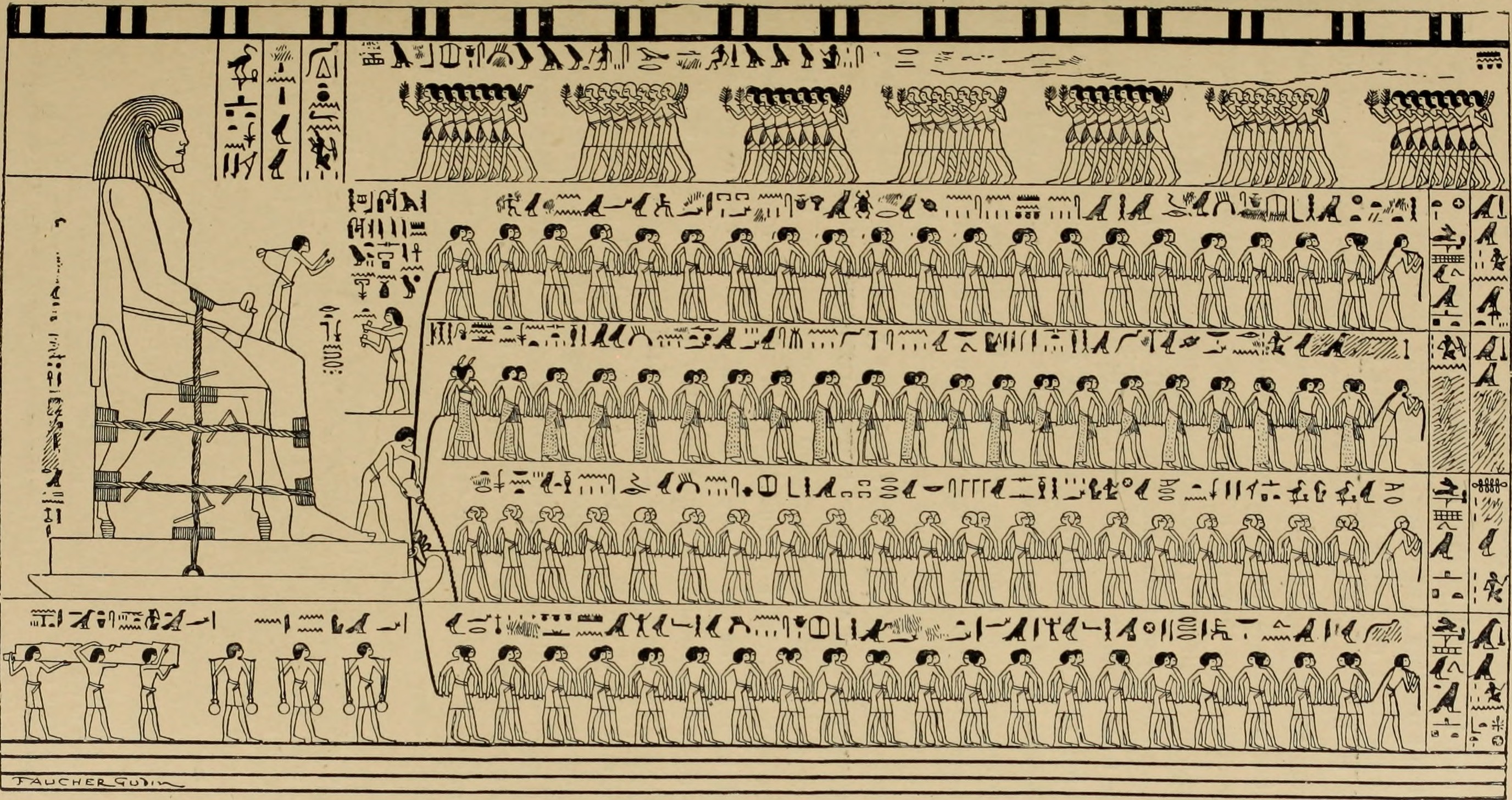
A transport of a large statue on a sledge

One of the major problems faced by the early pyramid builders was the need to move immense quantities of stone. The Twelfth Dynasty tomb of Djehutihotep has an illustration of 172 men pulling an alabaster statue of him on a sledge. The statue is estimated to weigh 60 tons and Denys Stocks estimated that 45 workers would be required to start moving a 16,300 kg (35,900 lb) lubricated block, or eight workers to move a 2,750 kg (6,060 lb) block. Dick Parry and Mladjov have suggested a method for rolling the stones, using a cradle-like machine that had been excavated in various new kingdom temples. Four of those objects could be fitted around a block so it could be rolled easily. Experiments done by the Obayashi Corporation, with concrete blocks 0.8 metres (2 ft 7 in) square by 1.6 metres (5 ft 3 in) long and weighing 2.5 tonnes (5,500 lb), showed how 18 men could drag the block over a 1-in-4 incline ramp, at a rate of 18 metres per minute (1 ft/s; 1 km/h). This idea was previously described by John Bush in 1977, and is mentioned in the Closing Remarks section of Parry's book. Vitruvius in De architectura described a similar method for moving irregular weights. It is still not known whether the Egyptians used this method but the experiments indicate it could have worked using stones of this size. Egyptologists generally accept this for the 2.5 ton blocks mostly used but do not agree over the methods used for the 15+ ton and several 70 to 80 ton blocks.

The diary of Merer, logbooks written more than 4,500 years ago by an Egyptian official and found in 2013 by a French archeology team under the direction of Pierre Tallet in a cave in Wadi al-Jarf, describes the transportation of limestone blocks from the quarries at Tura to Giza by boat.

=== Ramps ===
Example of a large straight ramp. This method was likely not used in pyramid construction according to current expert consensus (see text).

From left to right: Zig-zagging ramp (Uvo Hölscher (Egyptologist)), ramp using the incomplete part of the superstructure (Dieter Arnold), and a spiraling ramp supported by the superstructure (Mark Lehner)

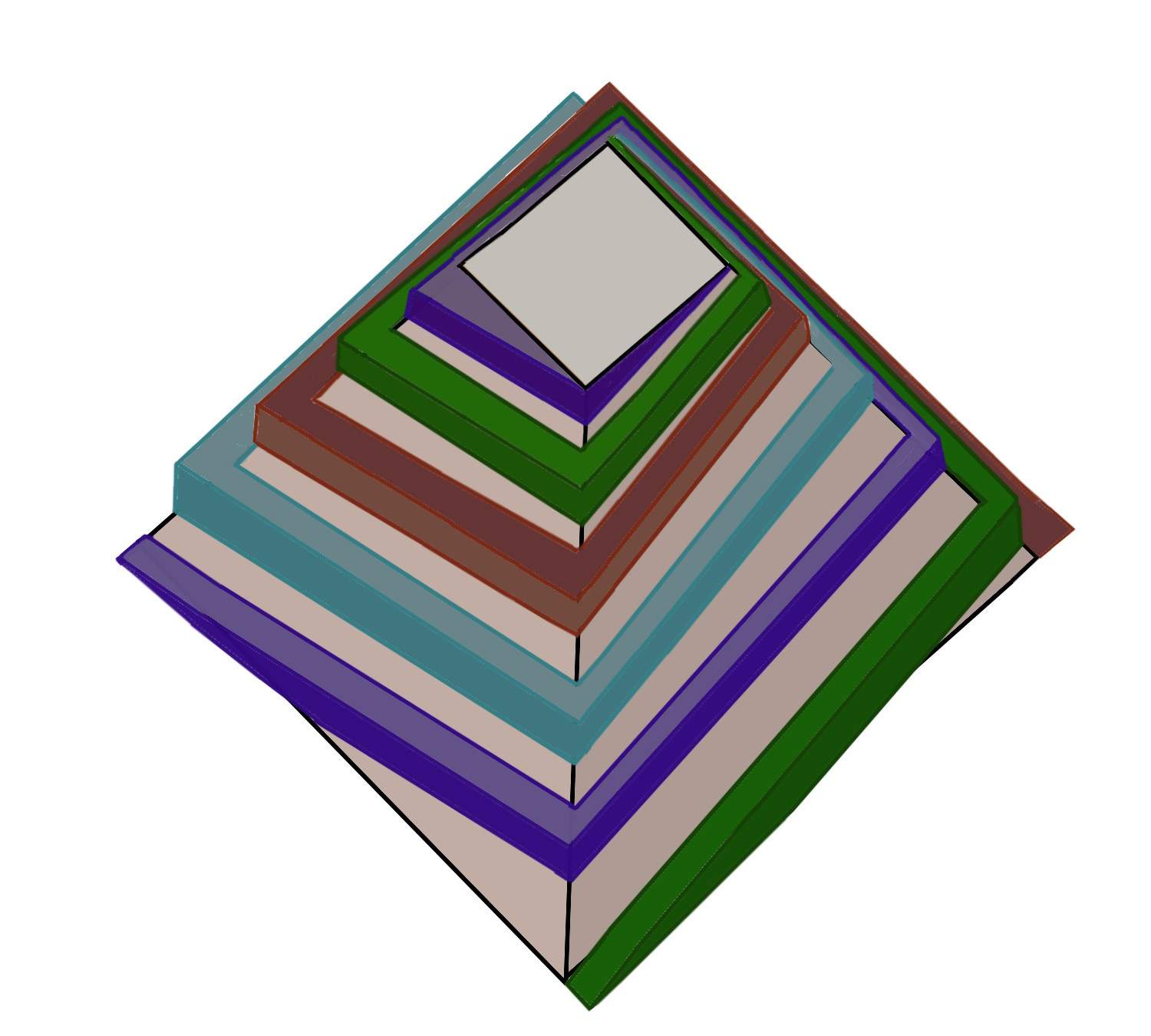
Four-spiral ramps (Dows Dunham)

Most Egyptologists acknowledge that ramps are the most tenable of the methods to raise the blocks, yet they acknowledge that it is an incomplete method that must be supplemented by another device. Archaeological evidence for the use of ramps has been found at the Great Pyramid of Giza and other pyramids. The method most accepted for assisting ramps is levering. The archaeological record gives evidence of only small ramps and inclined causeways, not something that could have been used to construct even a majority of the monument. To add to the uncertainty, there is considerable evidence demonstrating that non-standardized or ad hoc construction methods were used in pyramid construction.

Therefore, there are many proposed ramps and there is a considerable amount of discrepancy regarding what type of ramp was used to build the pyramids. One of the widely discredited ramping methods is the large straight ramp, and it is routinely discredited on functional grounds for its massive size, lack of archaeological evidence, huge labor cost, and other problems.

Other ramps serve to correct these problems of ramp size, yet run into critiques of either functionality or limited archaeological evidence. Zig-zagging ramps, straight ramps using the incomplete part of the superstructure (Arnold 1991), spiraling ramps supported by the superstructure and spiraling ramps leaning on the monument as a large accretion have been proposed. Mark Lehner speculated that a spiraling ramp, beginning in the stone quarry to the southeast and continuing around the exterior of the pyramid, may have been used. However, spiral ramps would have covered the building for decades fully and would not allow the regular layout of the exact pyramid square in equal distance to each base cornerstone as the only method to keep the exact geometric shape of the edges and side mantles. Ramp models with several ramp paths, which are positioned on the inner step pyramid require relatively less material. The stone blocks may have been drawn on sleds along the ramps lubricated by water.

As a recent study shows that the challenge was not just to account for the route the transported stones had to take but to account for the size and frequency of stones being moved—circa 1 ton being put in place every 2–3 minutes by human draw teams on a ramp of maximum 10%—to enable building of the Great Pyramid within 30 years. The special case of the pyramid extensions E2 and E3 in Meydum of ring-shaped extensions only 5 metres (16 ft) wide around the previous building core shows the ramp system was effective and small in volume which applies for tangential ramps of 10 cubits or 5 metre width. The challenge was the geometry of the pyramid that provides shorter side lengths the higher the building grows, increases the necessity to turn maneuvers and allows less space for ramps leaning on the masonry. The slope change of the Bent Pyramid is probably the result of the discovery this can not be solved with steep gradients. Also essential was the effective organization of the building site by a module that allowed the work division of the teams along plots and the transport causeways between ramp and workplace, including the return of pulling crews and sleds, probably by a second ramp system. The problem of building the mantle at the ramp arrival point could be solved by bypass-systems.

=== Levering ===
Levering methods are considered to be the most tenable solution to complement ramping methods, partially due to Herodotus's description; and partially to the shadoof, a lever-enabled irrigation device first depicted in Egypt during the New Kingdom and found concomitantly with the Old Kingdom in Mesopotamia. In Lehner's point of view, levers should be employed to lift the top 3% of the material of the superstructure. The top 4% of this material comprises 1/3 of the total height of the monument. In other words, in Lehner's view, levers should be employed to lift a small amount of material and a great deal of vertical height of the monument.

In the milieu of levering methods, there are those that lift the block incrementally, as in repeatedly prying up alternating sides of the block and inserting wooden or stone shims to gradually move the stone up one course; and there are other methods that use a larger lever to move the block up one course in one lifting procedure. Since the discussion of construction techniques to lift the blocks attempts to resolve a gap in the archaeological and historical record with a plausible functional explanation, the following examples by Isler, Keable, and Hussey-Pailos list experimentally tested methods. Isler's method (1985, 1987) is an incremental method and, in the Nova experiment (1992), used wooden shims or cribbing. Isler was able to lift a block up one tier in approximately one hour and 30 minutes. Peter Hodges and Julian Keable's method is similar to Isler's method and instead used small manufactured concrete blocks as shims, wooden pallets, and a pit where their experimental tests were performed. Keable was able to perform his method in approximately 2 minutes. Scott Hussey-Pailos's (2005) method uses a simple levering device to lift a block up a course in one movement. This method was tested with materials of less strength than historical analogs (tested with materials weaker than those available in ancient Egypt), a factor of safety of 2, and lifted a 1,100 kg (2,500 lb) block up one course in under a minute. This method is presented as a levering device to work complementary with Mark Lehner's idea of a combined ramp and levering techniques.

=== Waterways ===
Egyptians used the now-disappeared branch of the Nile to transport the tons of construction materials. A 2012 study led by geographer Hader Sheisha at Aix-Marseille University proposed that the former waterscapes and higher river levels around 4,500 years ago facilitated the construction of the Giza Pyramid Complex. The Nile's present waterways have receded too far from the pyramid sites to be of use.

A new study published in May 2024 mapped an extinct branch of the Nile, Ahramat Branch, which once flowed near Egypt's Great Pyramid and other Giza monuments. Using satellite imaging and sediment core analysis, researchers suggested that the 64 kilometres (40 mi) waterway was crucial for transporting materials and labor for pyramid construction. The branch, which was about 0.5 kilometres (0.31 mi) wide with a depth of at least 25 metres (82 ft), likely disappeared due to drought and desertification.

It has been suggested that locks were used to elevate barges along waterways leading to pyramid construction sites, but there is a lack of evidence of any on-site use of hydraulic force.

== Pyramid building experiments ==
=== Yoshimura ===
In 1978, Nippon TV funded the pyramid building project conceived by archaeologist Sajuki Yoshimura. It was originally planned as a 1 to 5 scale model of the Great Pyramid. Because of the limited budget, the size had to be drastically reduced when the price of limestone rose as the project gained publicity. A concrete foundation had to be poured as the selected site offered no bedrock basis. With the help of two cranes and a forklift, the pyramid was built to reach a height of 11 metres (36 ft), with a 15 metres (49 ft) base. The structure was ultimately dismantled and hauled away.

=== Nova ===
In 1992, Egyptologist Mark Lehner and stonemason Roger Hopkins conducted a three-week pyramid-building experiment for a Nova television episode. They built a pyramid 6 metres (20 ft) high by 9 metres (30 ft) wide, consisting of a total of 162 cubic metres (5,700 ft^{3}), or about 405 tons. It was made out of 186 stones weighing an average of 2.2 tons each. Twelve quarrymen carved 186 stones in 22 days, and the structure was erected by 44 men. As a modern shortcut, they used iron hammers, chisels and levers (the ancient Egyptians were limited to using copper and later bronze and wood), but Lehner and Hopkins did experiments with copper tools, noting that they were adequate for the job in hand, if additional manpower was available to constantly resharpen them; they estimated they would have needed around 20 extra men for this maintenance. Another shortcut taken was the use of a front-end loader or fork lift truck, but modern machinery was not used to finish the construction. They used levers to lift the capstone to a height of 20 feet (6.1 m). Four or five men were able to use levers on stones less than one ton to flip them over and transport them by rolling, but larger stones had to be towed. Lehner and Hopkins found that by putting the stones on wooden sledges and sliding the sledges on wooden tracks, they were able to tow a two-ton stone with 12 to 20 men. The wood for these sledges and tracks would have to have been imported from Lebanon at great cost since there was little, if any, wood in ancient Egypt. While the builders failed to duplicate the precise jointing created by the ancient Egyptians, Hopkins was confident that this could have been achieved with more practice.

== Great Pyramid ==
Some research suggests other estimates to the accepted workforce size. For instance, physicist Kurt Mendelssohn calculated that the workforce may have been 50,000 men at most, while Ludwig Borchardt and Louis Croon placed the number at 36,000. According to Miroslav Verner, a workforce of no more than 30,000 was needed in the Great Pyramid's construction. Evidence suggests that around 5,000 were permanent workers on salaries with the balance working three- or four-month shifts in lieu of taxes while receiving subsistence "wages" of ten loaves of bread and a jug of beer per day. Zahi Hawass believes that the majority of workers may have been volunteers. Most archaeologists agree that only about 4,000 of the total workforce were labourers who quarried the stone, hauled blocks to the pyramid, and set the blocks in place. The vast majority of the workforce provided support services such as scribes, toolmakers, and other backup services. The tombs of supervisors contain inscriptions regarding the organisation of the workforce. There were two crews of approximately 2,000 workers sub-divided into named gangs of 1,000. The gangs were divided into five phyles of 200 which were in turn split into groups of around 20 workers grouped according to their skills, with each group having their own project leader and a specific task.

A construction management study carried out by the firm Daniel, Mann, Johnson, & Mendenhall in association with Mark Lehner, and other Egyptologists, estimates that the total project required an average workforce of 14,567 people and a peak workforce of 40,000. Without the use of pulleys, wheels, or iron tools, they used critical path analysis to suggest the Great Pyramid was completed from start to finish in approximately 10 years. Their study estimates the number of blocks used in construction was between 2 and 2.8 million (an average of 2.4 million), but settles on a reduced finished total of 2 million after subtracting the estimated volume of the hollow spaces of the chambers and galleries. Most sources agree on this number of blocks somewhere above 2.3 million. Their calculations suggest the workforce could have sustained a rate of 180 blocks per hour (3 blocks/minute) with ten-hour workdays for putting each individual block in place. They derived these estimates from modern third-world construction projects that did not use modern machinery, but conclude it is still unknown exactly how the Great Pyramid was built. As Dr. Craig Smith of the team points out:

The logistics of construction at the Giza site are staggering when you think that the ancient Egyptians had no pulleys, no wheels, and no iron tools. Yet, the dimensions of the pyramid are extremely accurate and the site was leveled within a fraction of an inch over the entire 13.1-acre base. This is comparable to the accuracy possible with modern construction methods and laser leveling. That's astounding. With their 'rudimentary tools', the pyramid builders of ancient Egypt were about as accurate as we are today with 20th-century technology.

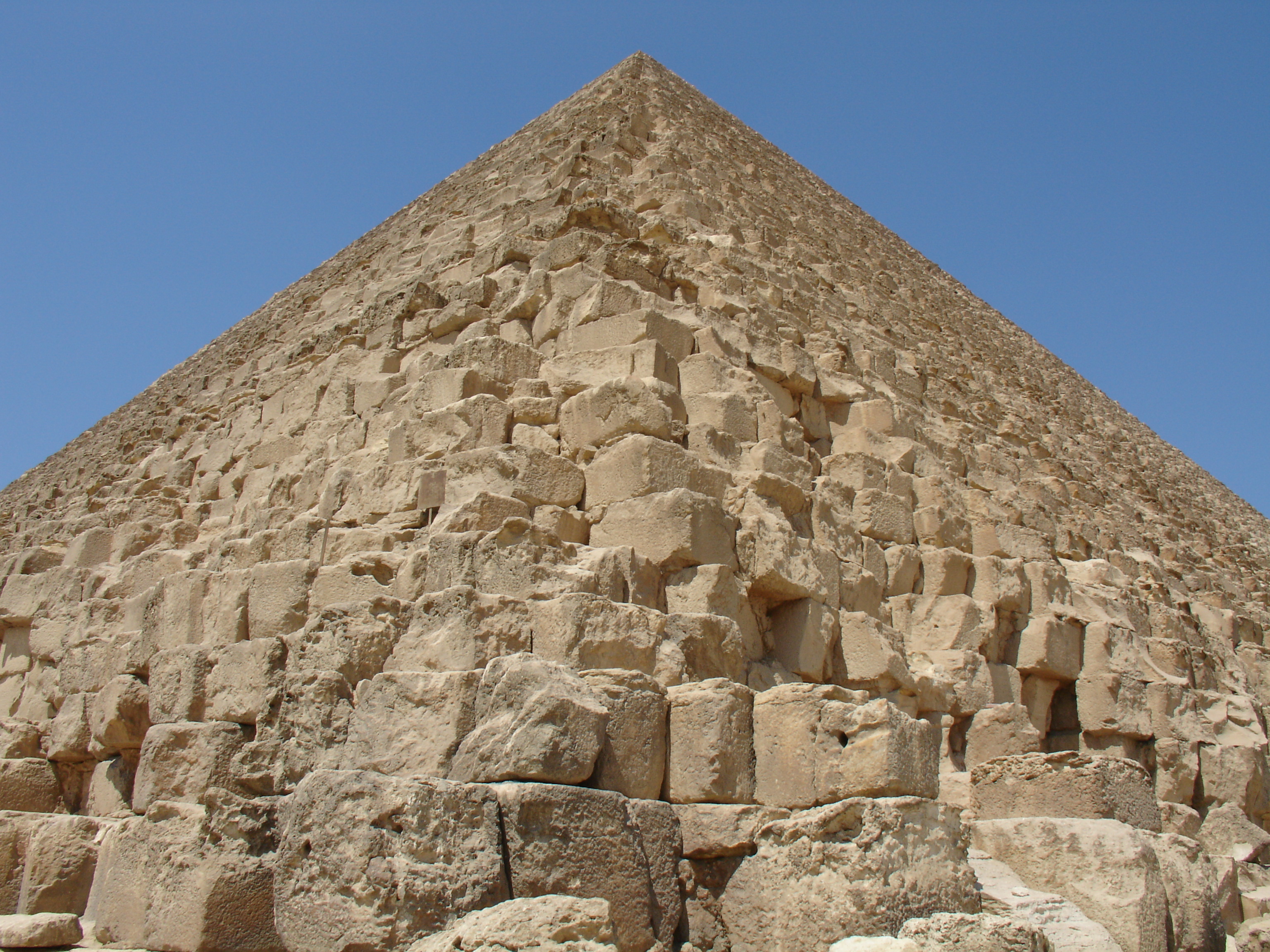
Average core blocks of the Great Pyramid weigh about 1.5 tons each, and the granite blocks used to roof the burial chambers are estimated to weigh up to 80 tons each.

The entire Giza Plateau is believed to have been constructed over the reign of five pharaohs in less than a hundred years, which generally includes: the Great Pyramid, Khafre and Menkaure's pyramids, the Great Sphinx, the Sphinx, and Valley Temples, 35 boat pits cut out of solid bedrock, and several causeways, as well as paving nearly the entire plateau with large stones. This does not include Khafre's brother Djedefre's northern pyramid at Abu Rawash, which would have also been built during this time frame of 100 years. In the hundred years prior to Giza—beginning with Djoser, who ruled from 2687 to 2667 BC, and amongst dozens of other temples, smaller pyramids, and general construction projects—four other massive pyramids were built: the Step pyramid of Saqqara (believed to be the first Egyptian pyramid), the pyramid of Meidum, the Bent Pyramid, and the Red Pyramid. Also during this period (between 2686 and 2498 BC) the Sadd el-Kafara dam, which used an estimated 100,000 cubic meters of rock and rubble, was built.

In October 2018, a team of archaeologists from the Institut Français d'Archéologie Orientale and University of Liverpool announced the discovery of the remains of a 4,500-year-old ramp contraption at Hatnub, excavated since 2012. This method, which aided in lifting the heavy alabaster stones up from their quarries, may have been used to build Egypt's Great Pyramid as well. Yannis Gourdon, co-director of the joint mission at Hatnub, said:

This system is composed of a central ramp flanked by two staircases with numerous post holes, using a sled which carried a stone block and was attached with ropes to these wooden posts, ancient Egyptians were able to pull up the alabaster blocks out of the quarry on very steep slopes of 20 percent or more ... As this system dates back at least to Khufu's reign, that means that during the time of Khufu, ancient Egyptians knew how to move huge blocks of stone using very steep slopes. Therefore, they could have used it for the construction [of] his pyramid.

=== Internal ramp hypothesis ===
Houdin's father was an architect who, in 1999, thought of a construction method that, it seemed to him, made more sense than any existing method proposed for building pyramids. To develop this hypothesis, Jean-Pierre Houdin, also an architect, gave up his job and set about drawing the first fully functional CAD architectural model of the Great Pyramid of Giza.

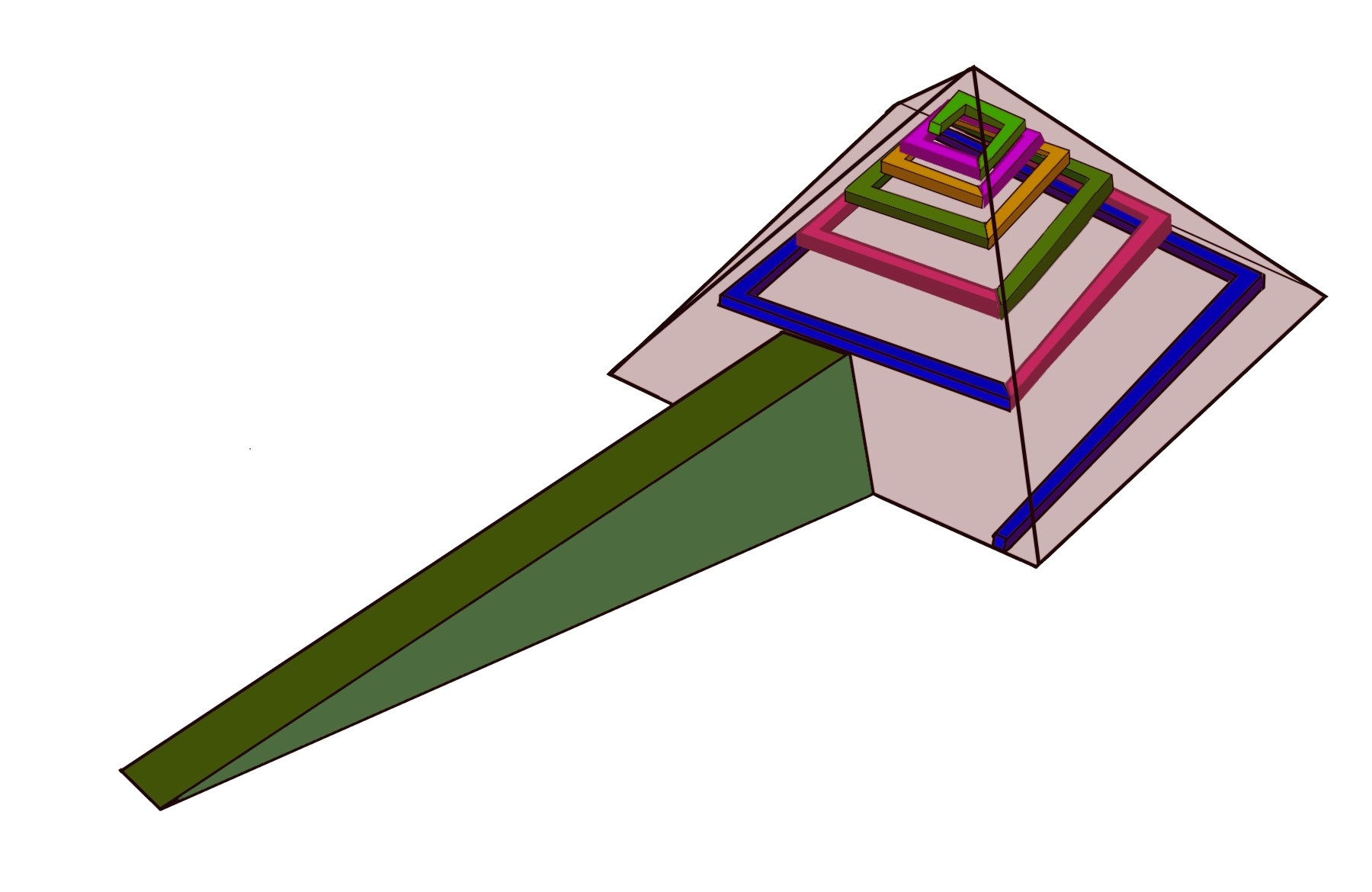
External and internal ramp

His scheme involves using a regular external ramp to build the first 30% of the pyramid, with an "internal ramp" taking stones up beyond that height. The stones of the external ramp are re-cycled into the upper stories, thus explaining the otherwise puzzling lack of evidence for ramps.

After four years working alone, Houdin was joined by a team of engineers from the French 3D software company Dassault Systèmes, who used the most modern computer-aided design technology available to further refine and test the hypothesis, making it (according to Houdin) the only one proven to be a viable technique. Houdin published his theory in the books Khufu: The Secrets Behind the Building of the Great Pyramid in 2006 and The Secret of the Great Pyramid, co-written in 2008 with Egyptologist Bob Brier.

In Houdin's method, each ramp inside the pyramid ended at an open space, a notch temporarily left open in the edge of the construction. This 10-square-meter clear space housed a crane that lifted and rotated each 2.5-ton block, to ready it for eight men to drag up the next internal ramp. There is a notch of sorts in one of the right places, and in 2008 Houdin's co-author Bob Brier, with a National Geographic film crew, entered a previously unremarked chamber that could be the start of one of these internal ramps. In 1986 a member of the French team (see below) saw a desert fox at this notch, rather as if it had ascended internally.

Houdin's thesis remains unproven and in 2007, Egyptologist David Jeffreys from the University College London described the internal spiral hypothesis as "far-fetched and horribly complicated", while Oxford University's John Baines, declared he was "suspicious of any theory that seeks to explain only how the Great Pyramid was built".

Houdin has another hypothesis developed from his architectural model, one that could finally explain the internal "Grand Gallery" chamber that otherwise appears to have little purpose. He believes the gallery acted as a trolley chute/guide for counterbalance weights. It enabled the raising of the five 60-ton granite beams that roof the King's Chamber. Houdin and Brier and the Dassault team are already credited with proving for the first time that cracks in beams appeared during construction, were examined and tested at the time and declared relatively harmless.

== See also ==
- Ancient Egyptian technology
- List of megalithic sites
- Seven wonders of the world
