= Y-box-binding protein 3 =

Protein-coding gene in humans

YBX3

Identifiers
- Aliases: YBX3, CSDA, CSDA1, DBPA, ZONAB, Y-box binding protein 3
- External IDs: OMIM: 603437; MGI: 2137670; GeneCards: YBX3

Gene location (Human)
Chr.	Chromosome 12 (human)
Band	12p13.2	Start	10,699,089 bp
Band	12p13.2	End	10,723,323 bp

Gene location (Mouse)
Chr.	Chromosome 6 (mouse)
Band	6|6 F3	Start	131,341,818 bp
Band	6|6 F3	End	131,365,439 bp
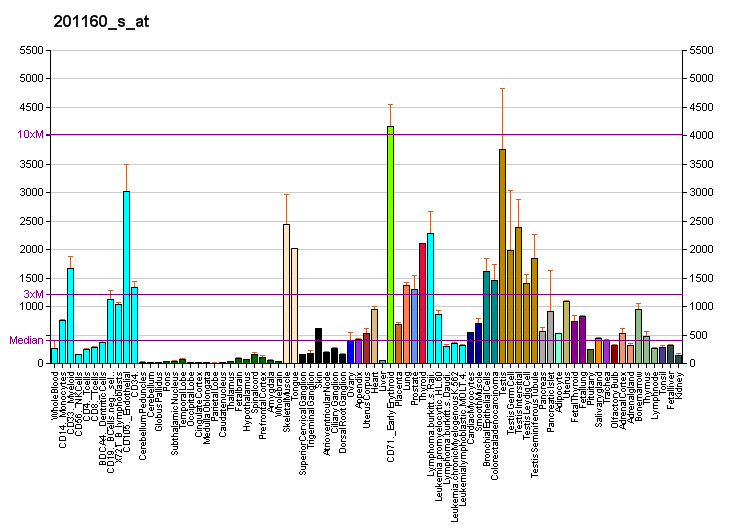

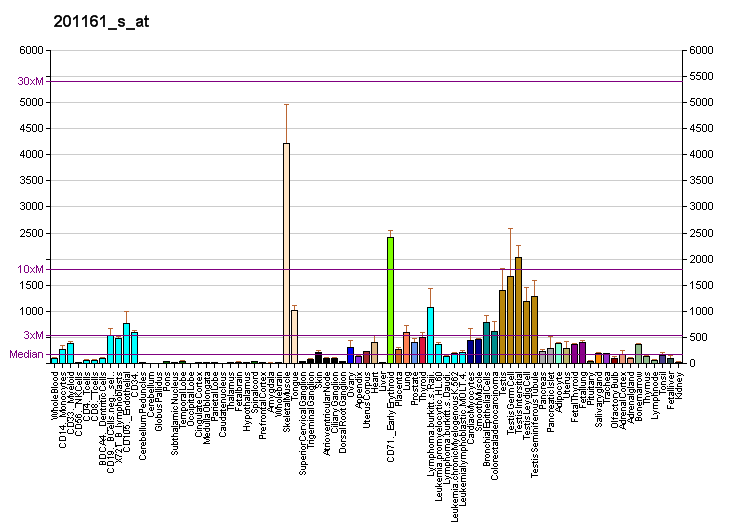
RNA expression pattern
Bgee	Human / Mouse (ortholog); Top expressed in: gastrocnemius muscle; Skeletal muscle tissue of rectus abdominis; muscle of thigh; body of tongue; Skeletal muscle tissue of biceps brachii; vastus lateralis muscle; tibialis anterior muscle; deltoid muscle; triceps brachii muscle; thoracic diaphragm / Top expressed in: seminiferous tubule; blood; medial head of gastrocnemius muscle; external carotid artery; internal carotid artery; muscle of thigh; quadriceps femoris muscle; intercostal muscle; digastric muscle; hair follicle; More reference expression data
BioGPS	More reference expression data
Gene ontology
Molecular function	DNA binding; RNA polymerase II transcription regulatory region sequence-specific DNA binding; transcription corepressor activity; DNA-binding transcription factor activity; mRNA 3'-UTR binding; single-stranded DNA binding; DNA-binding transcription repressor activity, RNA polymerase II-specific; nucleic acid binding; double-stranded DNA binding; RNA binding; DNA-binding transcription factor activity, RNA polymerase II-specific; protein binding; polysome binding
Cellular component	polysome; bicellular tight junction; perinuclear region of cytoplasm; nucleus; cytoplasm; cytosol
Biological process	male gonad development; regulation of transcription, DNA-templated; negative regulation of intrinsic apoptotic signaling pathway in response to osmotic stress; negative regulation of necroptotic process; positive regulation of cytoplasmic translation; cellular response to tumor necrosis factor; positive regulation of organ growth; negative regulation of apoptotic process; in utero embryonic development; negative regulation of transcription by RNA polymerase II; transcription, DNA-templated; cellular hyperosmotic response; negative regulation of skeletal muscle tissue development; spermatogenesis; response to cold; fertilization; 3'-UTR-mediated mRNA stabilization
Sources:Amigo / QuickGO
Orthologs
Databases	NCBI: entry; OMA: entry
Species	Human	Mouse
Entrez	8531	56449
Ensembl	ENSG00000060138	ENSMUSG00000030189
UniProt	P16989	Q9JKB3
RefSeq (mRNA)	NM_001145426; NM_003651	NM_011733; NM_139117
RefSeq (protein)	NP_001138898; NP_003642	NP_035863; NP_620817
Location (UCSC)	Chr 12: 10.7 – 10.72 Mb	Chr 6: 131.34 – 131.37 Mb
PubMed search
- Wikidata
View/Edit Human	View/Edit Mouse

Y-box-binding protein 3 is a protein that in humans is encoded by the gene YBX3 (previously CSDA). The protein YBX3 is involved in the regulation of GM-CSF through binding to DNA at its promotor. In particular, it is believed to repress expression.
