= Bob Brier =

American Egyptologist

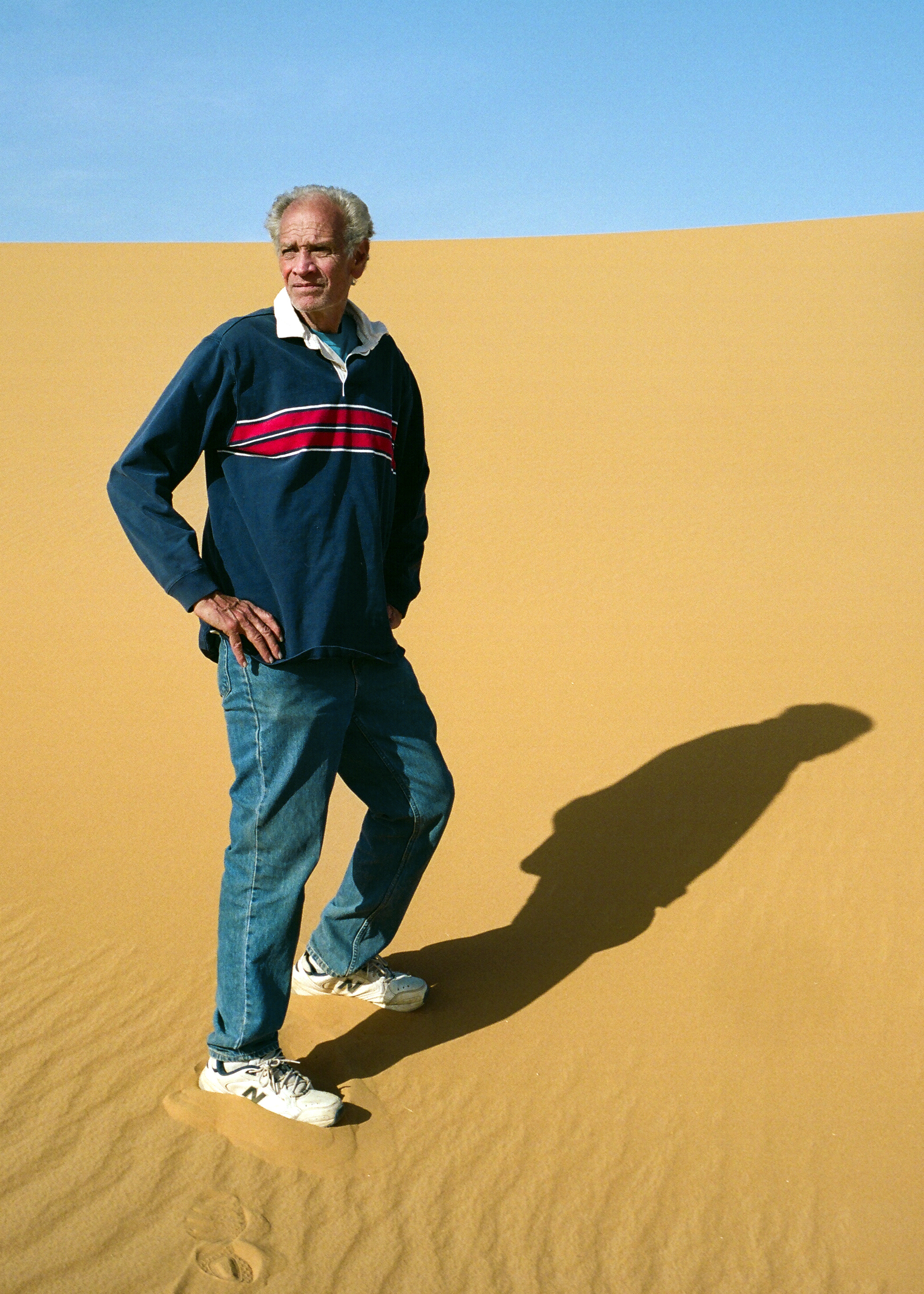
- Born: Robert Brier; December 13, 1943 (age 82); The Bronx, USA
- Scientific career
- Fields: Egyptologist

Robert Brier (/ˈbraɪ.ər/; born December 13, 1943) is an American Egyptologist specializing in paleopathology. A senior research fellow at Long Island University/LIU Post, he has researched and published on mummies and the mummification process and has appeared in many Discovery Civilization, TLC Network, and National Geographic documentaries, primarily on ancient Egypt. He is recognized as one of the world's foremost Egyptologists.

== Background ==
Born and raised in The Bronx, New York, Brier earned his bachelor's degree from Hunter College of the City University of New York. He earned his PhD in philosophy from the University of North Carolina at Chapel Hill in 1970 and began teaching at Long Island University in 1972. He served as chairman of the philosophy department from 1981 to 1996 and has also served as the director of the National Endowment for the Humanities' "Egyptology Today" program. He was appointed senior research fellow at LIU Post in 2004. In addition to his career at Long Island University, Brier has taught ancient Egyptian at The New School and Egyptology at Webb Institute for many years.

== Research and other achievements ==
Brier has worked in pyramids and tombs in 15 countries and conducted research in mummification practices worldwide. He has investigated well-known mummies such as Tutankhamen, Ramses the Great, Vladimir Lenin, Eva Perón (more commonly known as Evita), and the Medici family.

In 1994 Brier and a colleague, Ronald Wade, director of the State Anatomy Board of Maryland, mummified a human cadaver using ancient Egyptian techniques which they noted was the first known effort in 2,000 years. This research earned Brier the affectionate nickname "Mr. Mummy" and was also the subject of the National Geographic television special of the same name, which made him a household name. He is also the host of several television programs for the TLC Network including The Great Egyptians, Pyramids, Mummies and Tombs, and Mummy Detective. His research has been featured in Archaeology Magazine, The New York Times, CNN, 60 Minutes and 20/20.

In 1999, Brier gave a series of 48 specially-prepared lectures entitled "The History of Ancient Egypt" for The Teaching Company. He later did two more series of lectures for them. One focused on "Great Pharaohs of Ancient Egypt" and the other "Decoding the Secrets of Egyptian Hieroglyphs".

== TV Shows ==
- Decoding the Secrets of Egyptian Hieroglyphs
- History of Ancient Egypt

== Awards and recognition ==
- Fulbright Fellowship to Turkey 1985
- National Endowment for the Humanities Fellow, Islamic Science, Columbia University, 1986
- David Newton Award for Excellence in Teaching, 1988
- Director, National Endowment for the Humanities "Egyptology Today" Program, 1992–94
- TASA Award for Lifetime of Scholarship, 2002
- Emmy Nomination, Best TV Documentary, Murder of Tutankhamen, 1997

== Published works ==
Brier has also written several articles and books, including:

- "Precognition and the philosophy of science: An essay on backward causation" (1974) ISBN 0-391-00325-9
- "The Glory of Ancient Egypt: A Collection of Rare Engravings from the Napoleonic Expedition" (1990) ISBN 0-8115-4469-9
- "Egyptomania" (June, 1992) ISBN 0-933699-26-3
- "Egyptian Mummies : Unraveling the Secrets of an Ancient Art" (March 14, 1996) ISBN 0-688-14624-4
- "The Encyclopedia of Mummies" (September, 1998) ISBN 0-8160-3906-2
- "The Murder of Tutankhamen" (March 1, 1999) ISBN 0-425-16689-9
- "The Daily Life of the Ancient Egyptians" (with Hoyt Hobbs) (December 30, 1999) ISBN 0-313-30313-4
- The History of Ancient Egypt (2001, lectures published by The Teaching Company)
- Great Pharaohs of Ancient Egypt (2004, lectures published by The Teaching Company)
- "The Secret of the Great Pyramid" (with Jean-Pierre Houdin) (October 6, 2008)
- "Immunological identification of Plasmodium falciparum and Leishmania infantum in the skeletal remains of the Medici family", Proceedings of the XVIII Congress of Italian Anthropological Association, 2009
- "Return to the Great Pyramid," Archaeology Magazine, 2009
- Egyptomania: Our Three Thousand Year Obsession with the Land of the Pharaohs (Nov 12, 2013) ISBN 1137278609
- Decoding the Secrets of Egyptian Hieroglyphs (2016, lectures published by The Teaching Company, now The Great Courses)
- Cleopatra's Needles: The Lost Obelisks of Egypt. Bloomsbury Academic, 2016.

Brier has also written magazine articles for KMT, Archaeology, and others.
