= Muometric navigation =

Use of experimental particle physics for navigation

Muometric navigation is positioning, navigation and timing using cosmic ray muons and other cosmic particles.

It is possible to determine locations with GNSS satellites with well-known positions and time. GNSS is often used by critically important governmental organizations for navigating ships and planes, but the signals can be easily jammed and spoofed. In 2020 Hiroyuki K.M. Tanaka created an entirely new approach from GNSS that locates the receiver's position with cosmic-ray muons.

Muometric techniques include the muometric positioning system (muPS), the muometric wireless navigation system (MuWNS) or muPS Wireless Navigation System (muWNS), cosmic time synchronizer (CTS) and cosmic time calibrator (CTC).

== Positioning and navigation ==
The muometric positioning and navigation techniques are based on the time-of-flight of relativistic cosmic-ray muons between reference detectors and the receiver detector usually located indoor, underground, or underwater. Instead of receiving a GNSS signal, they detect cosmic-ray muons. Three or more reference detectors are deployed with known positions and time-references. Like GNSS, clocks between the reference receivers and the receiver must be well-synchronized. Unlike GNSS, this technology enables navigation in Arctic areas where GNSS satellite access is limited due to orbital constraints of these satellites.

The initial prototype required wiring between the receiver and each reference detector for accurate time synchronization. However, this configuration restricted the range of applicability of the system. Efforts to find a way to navigate without wires, growing out of the success of this initial system replaced wires with a clock. muWNS is expected to be applied to rescue teams, for example, to guide robots underwater and underground by positioning inside tunnels, in a building or mine collapse.

The indoor muometric positioning accuracy is 3.9 cm as of 2023.

== Timing ==
Precise timekeeping generally requires GNSS and atomic clock systems, but these are expensive and unavailable in indoor, underground or underwater areas. Also, GNSS is vulnerable to cyber-attack and disruption. A method using cosmic particles was proposed to precisely track time to solve this problem. Cosmic rays collide in the atmosphere, generating particle showers. The muons in these showers travel close to the speed of light and spread out as they travel through the atmosphere. They reach the ground at almost the same time, so by sharing the information provided by these muons, clocks can be synchronized. A recent demonstration showed its synchronization precision of tens of nanoseconds over a distance of 60 m.

Random timestamps generated in this cosmic time synchronizing scheme can be used in turn for generating random numbers for secure data transfer. The sender and receiver use the same muons to create truly random cryptographic keys from the timestamp. Based on the precise time delay between the sender and the receiver calculated from the distance between the detectors within 10 meters each other, the receiver knows the private key without having to directly exchange it between the sender and the receiver. Applications potentially range from secure cloud storage, communications, to virtual currency generation.
