= Continuous slowing down approximation range =

The CSDA range is a very close approximation to the average distance traveled by a charged particle as it slows down to rest, calculated in the continuous-slowing-down approximation. In this approximation, the rate of energy loss at every point along the track is assumed to be equal to the same as the total stopping power. Energy-loss fluctuations are neglected. The CSDA range is obtained by integrating the reciprocal of the total stopping power with respect to energy.
