= ScanPyramids =

International cooperation

The ScanPyramids mission is an international project designed and led by Cairo University and the French HIP Institute (Heritage Innovation Preservation). This project aims at scanning Old Kingdom Egyptian Pyramids (Khufu, Khafre, the Bent and the Red) to detect the presence of unknown internal voids and structures.

The project, launched in October 2015, combines several non-invasive and non-destructive techniques which may help to get a better understanding of their structure and their construction processes and techniques. The team was using Infrared thermography, muon tomography, 3D simulation and reconstruction techniques.

ScanPyramids is an interdisciplinary project mixing art, science and technology. On November 2, 2017, the ScanPyramids team announced, through a publication in Nature, its third discovery in the Great Pyramid, a "plane-sized" previously unknown void named the "ScanPyramids Big Void".

== Discoveries ==
=== 2016 ===
On October 15, 2016, ScanPyramids confirmed their first unknown void discoveries thanks to muon tomography in the Great Pyramid. A previously unknown cavity was confirmed on the North-Eastern Edge, roughly at 110 metres (360 ft) high with similar void volume characteristics as a known "cave" located at 83 metres (272 ft) on the same edge.

A second void was discovered behind the chevrons area of Khufu's North Face above the Descending Corridor (referred to as "SP-NFC" in papers). This area was investigated after thermal anomalies observation that led the team to position muon emulsion plates in the Descending Corridor. This void was further investigated during 2017 to provide more information about its shape, size, and exact position.

=== 2017 ===
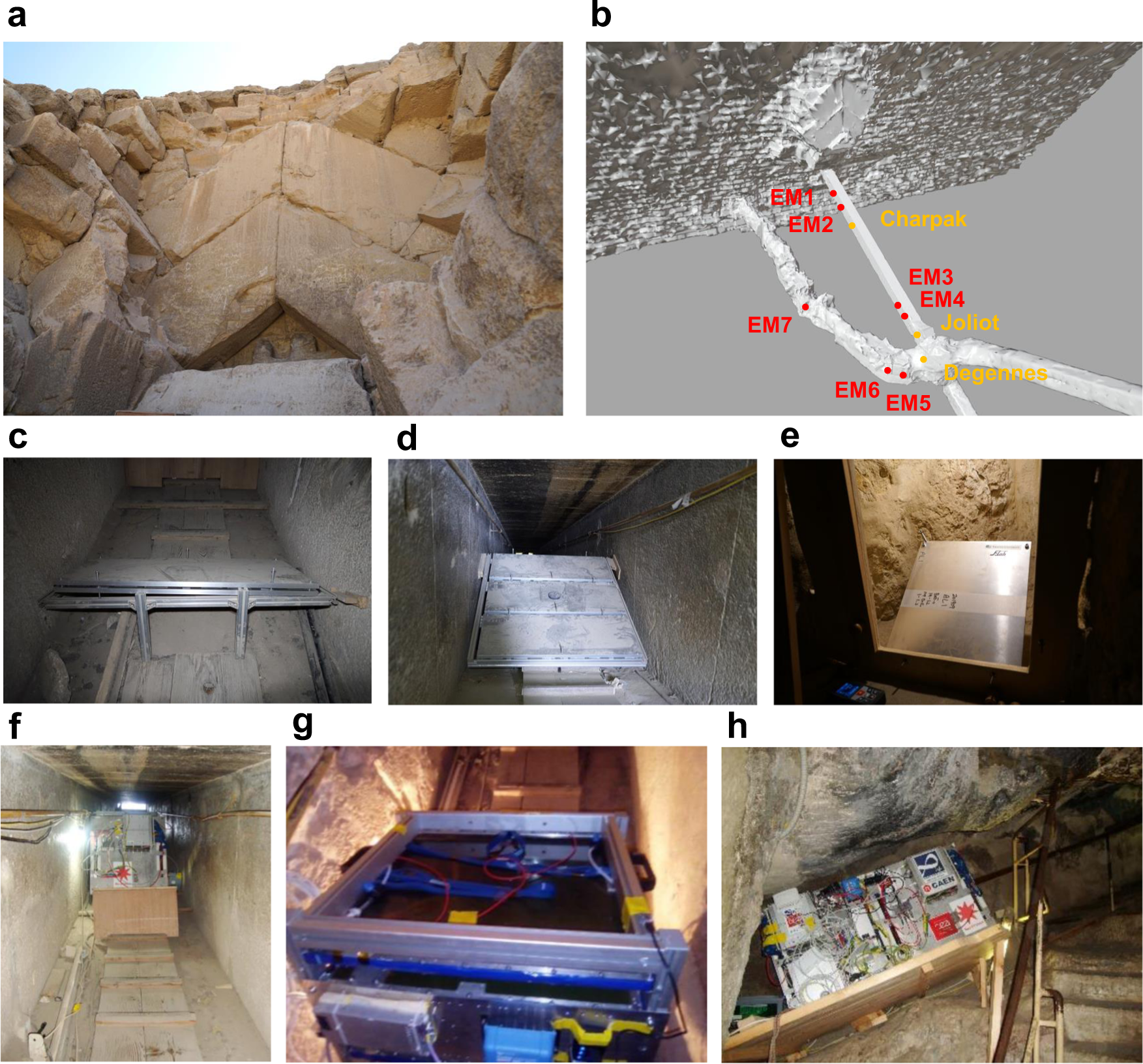
Detectors installed in the descending corridor (DC) and in the al-Ma’mun corridor (MC). a The Chevron, which consists of huge gabled limestone beams, covering the original entrance to the DC on the North side of Khufu's Pyramid. b 3D model and positions of the detectors from Nagoya University, indicated by red dots and of the detectors from CEA, indicated by orange dots, in the DC and in the MC. c–h The detectors. c shows EM3, d shows EM2, e shows EM5, f shows Charpak, g shows Joliot and h shows Degennes.

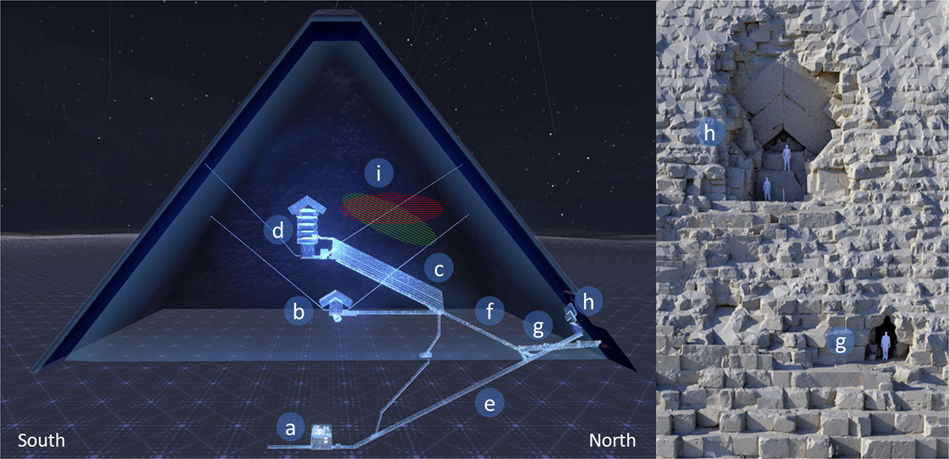
East-West cut view of the Great Pyramid and front view of the North face Chevron area. a Subterranean chamber, b queen's chamber, c grand gallery, d king's chamber, e descending corridor, f ascending corridor, g al-Ma’mun corridor, h north face Chevron area, i ScanPyramids Big Void with horizontal hypothesis (red hatching) and inclined hypothesis (green hatching) as published in November 2017.

In 2017 more muon-sensitive emulsion plates were positioned in the descending corridor and in Al-Mamun's tunnel. The void behind the chevrons could be confirmed through different points of view and its characteristics refined. Named "ScanPyramids North-Face Corridor" (SP-NFC), this void is located between 17 and 23 metres (56 and 75 ft) from the Great Pyramid's ground level, between 0.7 and 2 metres (2 ft 4 in and 6 ft 7 in) from the North Face. It could be horizontal or sloping upwards and it has a corridor-like shape.

==== ScanPyramids Big Void (SP-BV) ====
On November 2, 2017, the ScanPyramids team published its third discovery in Nature, which was named "ScanPyramids Big Void", or "SP-BV" for short. It describes a newly discovered huge void in a circumscribed area above the Grand Gallery. It is estimated to have a length of at least 30 metres (98 ft) and a similar cross-section as the Grand Gallery. The ScanPyramids Big Void has been observed by three teams of physicists from different points of view (2 points of view in the Queen's Chamber and from outside in front of the North Face).

Three scientific institutions specializing in particle physics have worked independently and each one used a different and complementary muography technique:

- Nagoya University, Japan: Nuclear emulsion plates in the Queen's Chamber under the leadership of Professor Morishima Kunihiro
- High Energy Accelerator Research Organization (KEK), Japan: Scintillator hodoscope in the Queen's Chamber
- Alternative Energies and Atomic Energy Commission (CEA), France: Muon telescopes with gas detectors positioned outside in front of the Great Pyramid's North Face.

Like the work done on the "ScanPyramids North Face Corridor", more muography observations, from new viewpoints, need to be conducted in order to better determine the Big Void's shape, so that functional inferences can be drawn. As long the exact layout and function of the void is still unknown, the scientists have been cautious about using architectural nomenclature.

==== North Facing Corridor (SP-NFC) ====
In March 2023, the team published its finding of the North Facing Corridor (NFC) behind the original entrance; the void is called "SP-NFC" (ScanPyramids - North Face Corridor) in the paper.

== Reactions ==
=== Egyptologists ===
On November 2, 2017, the Egyptologist Zahi Hawass told the New York Times: "They found nothing...This paper offers nothing to Egyptology. Zero." Later, once the North Face Corridor was inspected with an Endoscope, Hawass conversely commented that ScanPyramids's work had provided a "major discovery" that would "enter houses and homes of people all over the world for the first time".

On November 3, 2017, Egypt's Ministry of Tourism and Antiquities released a statement, asserting, "The existence of several void spaces inside the pyramid is not a new thing. Egyptologists and scholars knew about it several years ago," adding, "the ministry sees that the ScanPyramid team should not have rushed [sic] to publish their findings in media at that stage of their research because it requires more research and it is too early to say that there was a new discovery." The next day, on November 4, Khaled El-Enany, the Egyptian Minister of Antiquities, said during a press conference that the void space found inside the Pyramid of Khufu by the ScanPyramids project was a new revelation that had brought the world's attention to Egypt. El-Enany added, "What was discovered is new and larger than the known cavities, and we'll continue in our scientific steps".

Yukinori Kawae told National Geographic, "This is definitely the discovery of the century... There have been many hypotheses about the pyramid, but no one even imagined that such a big void is located above the Grand Gallery."

Peter der Manuelian of Harvard University said, "This is an exciting new discovery, and potentially a major contribution to our knowledge about the Great Pyramid."

=== Physicists ===
Lee Thompson, an expert in particle physics at the University of Sheffield (UK) told Science: "The scientists have "seen" the void using three different muon detectors in three independent experiments, which makes their finding very robust." Christopher Morris, physicist at Los Alamos National Laboratory called the findings "pretty amazing". Jerry Anderson who worked on Khafre's Pyramid and was a member of the team of Luis Walter Alvarez, the first scientist to use muography inside a pyramid in 1965, said to Los Angeles Times, with a laugh: "I am very excited and very pleased,...I wish we had worked in the Great Pyramid, now that I look back on it".

=== International media ===
This discovery has been featured in many international media as one of the top discoveries of the year 2017 (NBC News, Euronews, Physics World, Science News, Global News, Gizmodo, Business Insider, Altmetric, Egypt Today, NBC, MSN News, Le Monde, CTV, The Franklin Institute, Radio Canada, Sciences et Avenir, RTÉ, PBS, Yahoo, La Vanguardia, France Info).
