= Ancient Egypt =

Cradle of civilization in North Africa

- c. 3150 BC – 30 BC
- Ancient Egyptian cities and other sites following the Nile up to the Fifth Cataract. Modern Cairo is marked for reference.
- Capital: See List of historical capitals of Egypt
- Common languages: Egyptian language
- Religion: Egyptian religion
- Demonym: Egyptian
- Historical era: Ancient history
  - Unification of Upper and Lower Egypt: c. 3150 BC
  - Early Dynastic Period: c. 3150 BC – 2686 BC
  - Old Kingdom: 2686 BC – 2181 BC
  - Middle Kingdom: 2134 BC – 1690 BC
  - New Kingdom: 1549 BC – 1078/77 BC (Note: With the death of Ramesses XI)
  - Late Period: 664 BC – 332 BC
  - Ptolemaic Kingdom: 332 BC – 30 BC
  - Annexation by the Roman Empire: 30 BC (Note: Depending on the definition, the end of ancient Egypt may be considered to have occurred either with the end of the Late Period in 332 BC or with the end of the Ptolemaic Kingdom in 30 BC.)
Preceded by	Succeeded by
Prehistoric Egypt	Roman Egypt

Ancient Egypt was a cradle of civilization concentrated along the lower reaches of the Nile River in the eastern part of North Africa. It emerged from prehistoric Egypt around 3150 BC (according to conventional Egyptian chronology), when Upper and Lower Egypt were united by Menes, who is believed by the majority of Egyptologists to have been the same person as Narmer. The history of ancient Egypt unfolded as a series of stable kingdoms interspersed by the "Intermediate Periods" of relative instability. These stable kingdoms existed in one of three periods: the Old Kingdom of the Early Bronze Age; the Middle Kingdom of the Middle Bronze Age; or the New Kingdom of the Late Bronze Age.

The pinnacle of ancient Egyptian power was achieved during the New Kingdom, which extended its rule to much of Nubia and a considerable portion of the Levant. After this period, Egypt entered an era of slow decline. Over the course of its history, it was invaded or conquered by a number of foreign civilizations, including the Hyksos, the Kushites, the Assyrians, the Persians, the Greeks and the Romans. The end of ancient Egypt is variously defined as occurring with the end of the Late Period during the Wars of Alexander the Great in 332 BC or with the end of the Greek-ruled Ptolemaic Kingdom during the Roman conquest of Egypt in 30 BC. In AD 642, the Arab conquest of Egypt brought an end to the region's millennium-long Greco-Roman period.

The success of ancient Egyptian civilization came partly from its ability to adapt to the Nile's conditions for agriculture. The predictable flooding of the Nile and controlled irrigation of its fertile valley produced surplus crops which supported a more dense population and thereby substantial social and cultural development. With resources to spare, the administration sponsored the mineral exploitation of the valley and its surrounding desert regions, the early development of an independent writing system, the organization of collective construction and agricultural projects, trade with other civilizations, and a military to assert Egyptian dominance throughout the Near East. Motivating and organizing these activities was a bureaucracy of elite scribes, religious leaders, and administrators under the control of the reigning pharaoh, who ensured the cooperation and unity of the Egyptian people in the context of an elaborate system of religious beliefs.

Among the many achievements of ancient Egypt are: the quarrying, surveying, and construction techniques that supported the building of monumental pyramids, temples, and obelisks; a system of mathematics; a practical and effective system of medicine; irrigation systems and agricultural production techniques; the first known planked boats; Egyptian faience and glass technology; new forms of literature; and the earliest known peace treaty, which was ratified with the Anatolia-based Hittite Empire. Its art and architecture were widely copied and its antiquities were carried off to be studied, admired, or coveted in the far corners of the world. Likewise, its monumental ruins inspired the imaginations of travelers and writers for millennia. A newfound European and Egyptian respect for antiquities and excavations that began in earnest in the early modern period has led to much scientific investigation of ancient Egypt and its society, as well as a greater appreciation of its cultural legacy.

== History ==
The Nile has been the lifeline of its region for much of human history. The fertile floodplain of the Nile gave humans the opportunity to develop a settled agricultural economy and a more sophisticated, centralized society that became a cornerstone in the history of human civilization.

=== Predynastic period ===
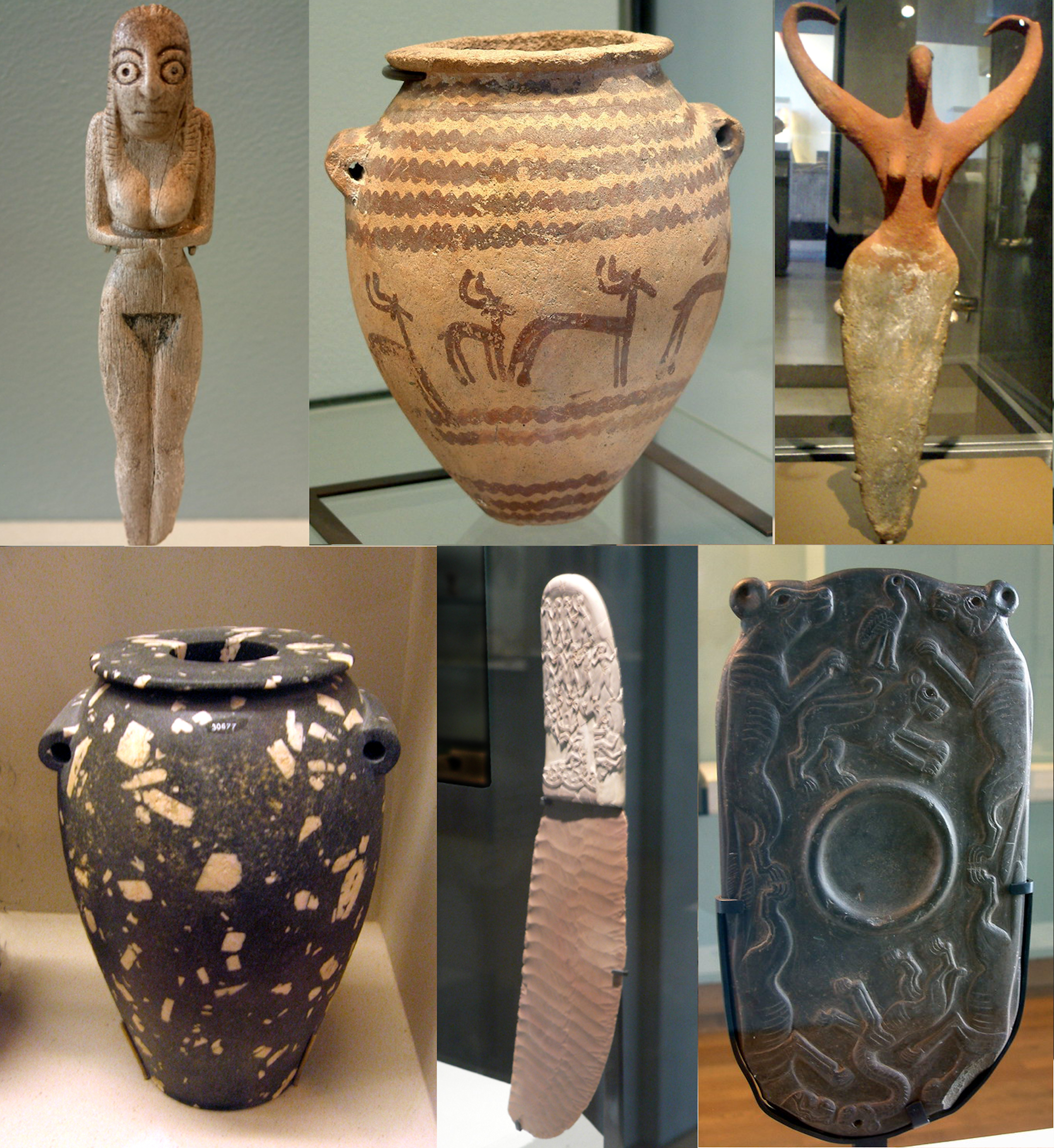
Artifacts of Egypt from the prehistoric period, from 4400 to 3100 BC. First row from top left: a Badarian ivory figurine, a Naqada II jar, a Bat figurine. Second row: a diorite vase, the Gebel el-Arak Knife, a cosmetic palette.

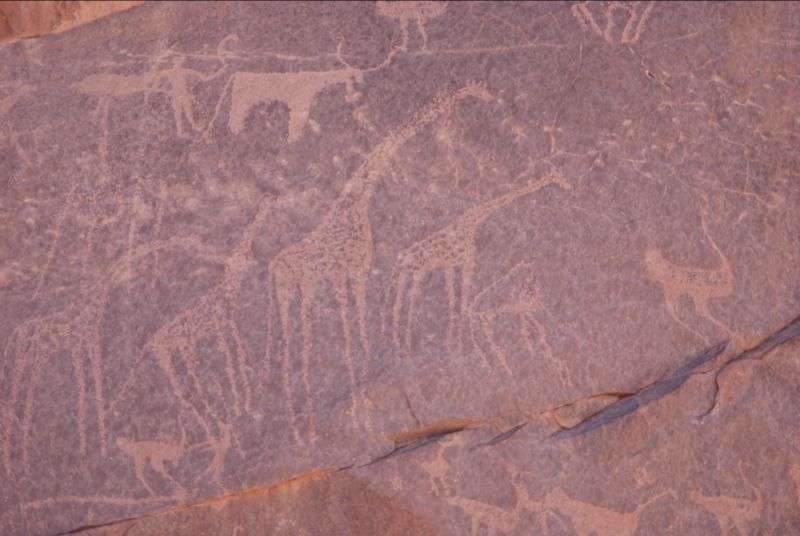
Ancient Petroglyphs of giraffe, ostrich, and longhorned cow being driven by a human, featured in the desert region, Gilf Kebir, Egypt.

In Predynastic and Early Dynastic times, the Egyptian climate was much less arid than it is today. Large regions of Egypt were savanna and traversed by herds of grazing ungulates. Foliage and fauna were far more prolific in all environs, and the Nile region supported large populations of waterfowl. Hunting would have been common for Egyptians, and this is also the period when many animals were first domesticated.

By about 5500 BC, small tribes living in the Nile valley had developed into a series of cultures demonstrating firm control of agriculture and animal husbandry, and identifiable by their pottery and personal items, such as combs, bracelets, and beads. The largest of these early cultures in upper (Southern) Egypt was the Badarian culture, which probably originated in the Western Desert; it was known for its high-quality ceramics, stone tools, and its use of copper.

The Badari was followed by the Naqada culture: the Naqada I (Amratian), the Naqada II (Gerzeh), and Naqada III (Semainean). These brought a number of technological improvements. As early as the Naqada I Period, predynastic Egyptians imported obsidian from Ethiopia, used to shape blades and other objects from flakes. Mutual trade with the Levant was established during Naqada II (c. 3600–3350 BC); this period was also the beginning of trade with Mesopotamia, which continued into the early dynastic period and beyond. Over a period of about 1,000 years, the Naqada culture developed from a few small farming communities into a powerful civilization whose leaders were in complete control of the people and resources of the Nile valley. Establishing a power center at Nekhen, and later at Abydos, Naqada III leaders expanded their control of Egypt northwards along the Nile. They also traded with Nubia to the south, the oases of the western desert to the west, and the cultures of the eastern Mediterranean and Near East to the east.

The Naqada culture manufactured a diverse selection of material goods, reflective of the increasing power and wealth of the elite, as well as societal personal-use items, which included combs, small statuary, painted pottery, high quality decorative stone vases, cosmetic palettes, and jewelry made of gold, lapis, and ivory. They also developed a ceramic glaze known as faience, which was used well into the Roman Period to decorate cups, amulets, and figurines. During the last predynastic phase, the Naqada culture began using written symbols that eventually were developed into a full system of hieroglyphs for writing the ancient Egyptian language.

=== Early Dynastic Period (c. 3150–2686 BC) ===
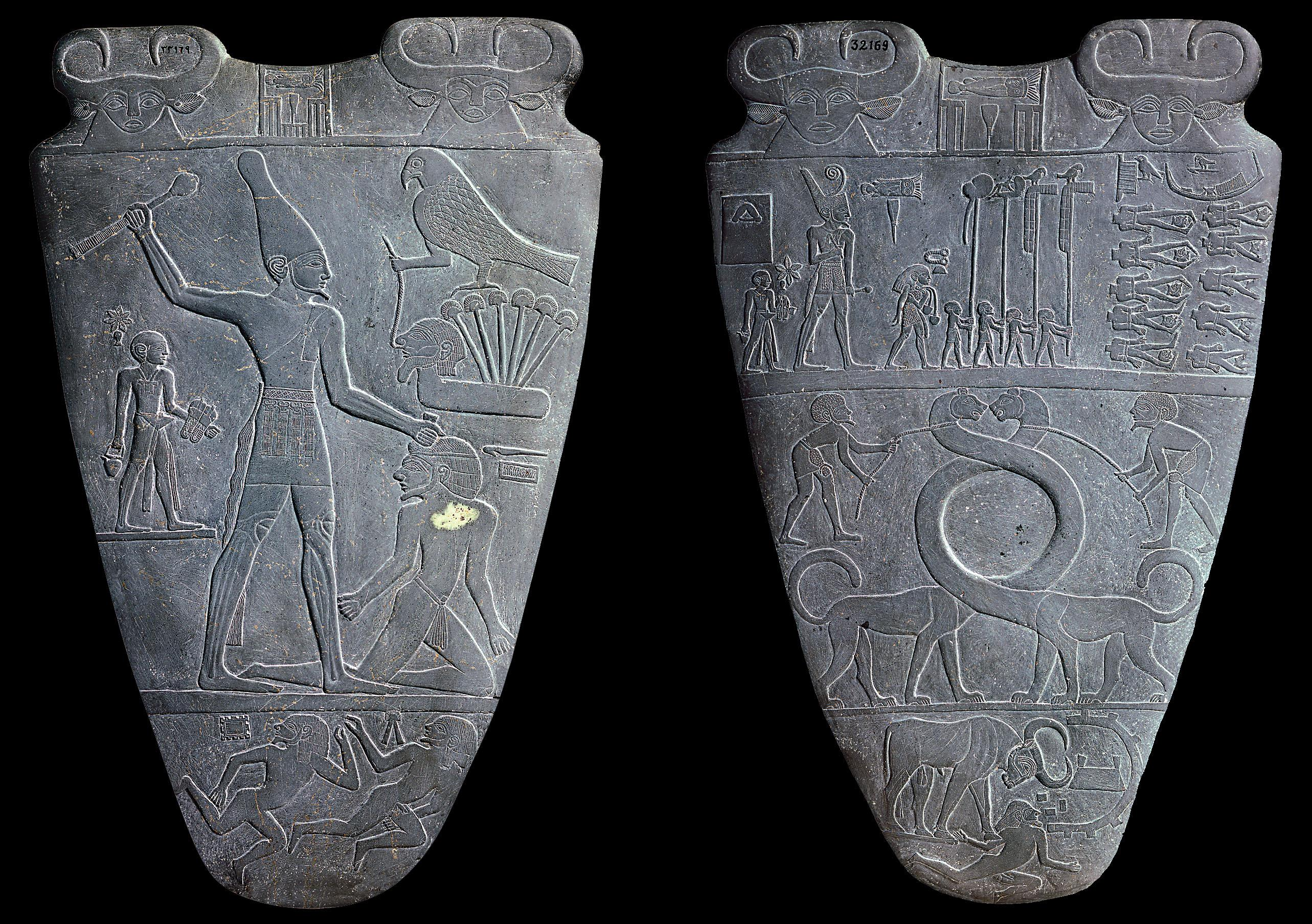
The Narmer Palette depicts the unification of the Two Lands.

The Early Dynastic Period was approximately contemporary to the early Sumerian-Akkadian civilization of Mesopotamia and of ancient Elam. The third-century BC Egyptian priest Manetho grouped the long line of kings from Menes to his own time into 30 dynasties, a system still used today. He began his official history with the king named "Meni" (or Menes in Greek), who was believed to have united the two kingdoms of Upper and Lower Egypt.

The transition to a unified state happened more gradually than ancient Egyptian writers represented, and there is no contemporary record of Menes. Some scholars now believe, however, that the mythical Menes may have been the king Narmer, who is depicted wearing royal regalia on the ceremonial Narmer Palette, in a symbolic act of unification. In the Early Dynastic Period, which began about 3000 BC, the first of the Dynastic kings solidified control over Lower Egypt by establishing a capital at Memphis, from which he could control the labor force and agriculture of the fertile delta region, as well as the lucrative and critical trade routes to the Levant. The increasing power and wealth of the kings during the early dynastic period was reflected in their elaborate mastaba tombs and mortuary cult structures at Abydos, which were used to celebrate the deified king after his death. The strong institution of kingship developed by the kings served to legitimize state control over the land, labor, and resources that were essential to the survival and growth of ancient Egyptian civilization.

=== Old Kingdom (2686–2181 BC) ===
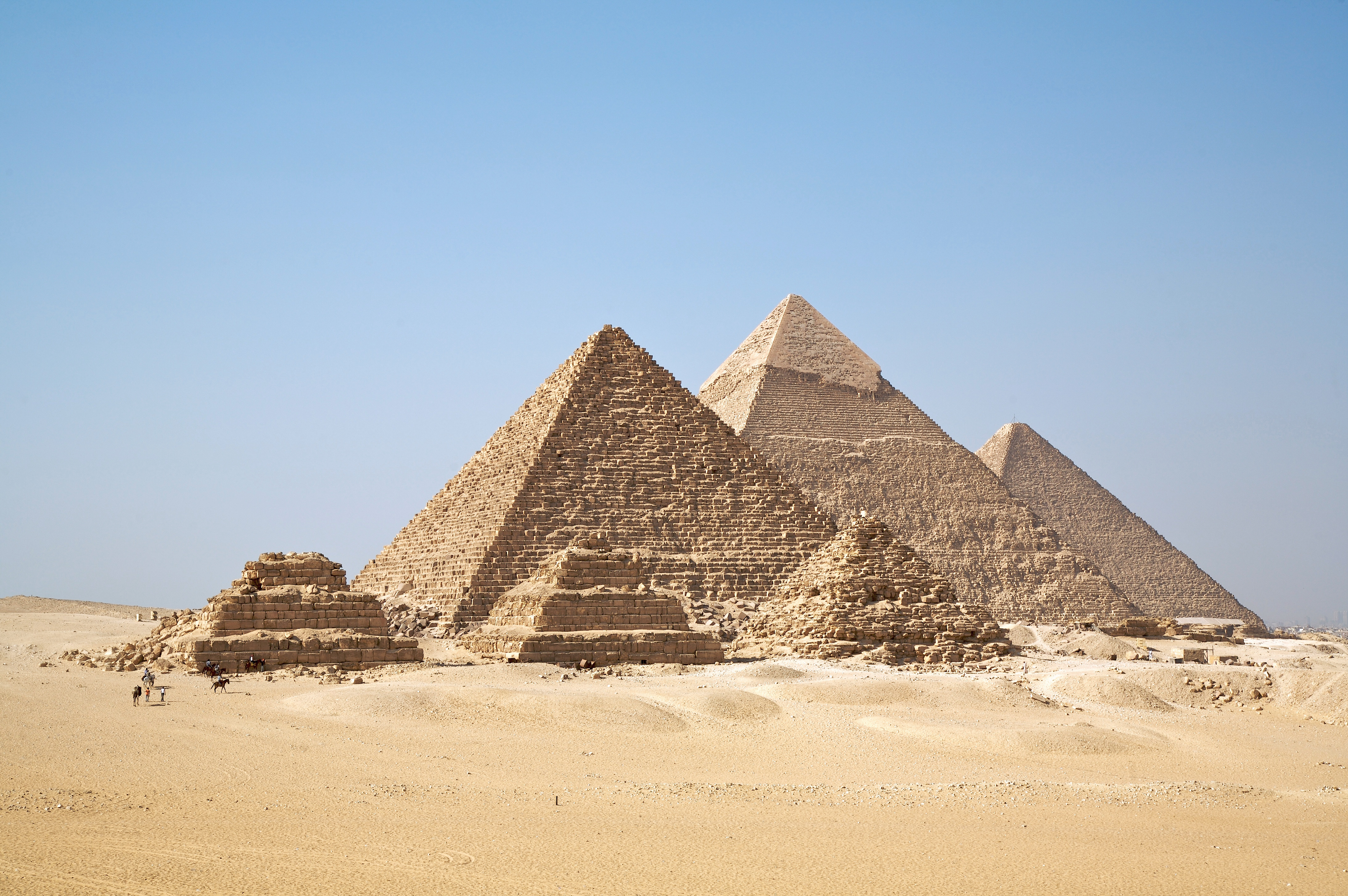
The pyramids of Giza are among the most recognizable symbols of ancient Egyptian civilization.

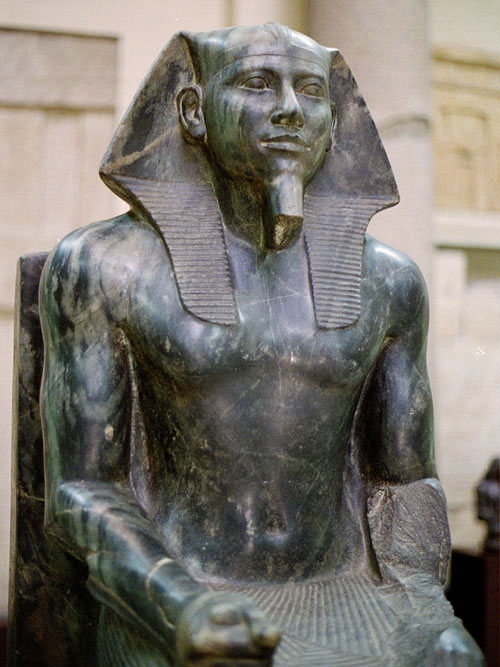
Khafre enthroned (c. 2558–2532 BC)

Major advances in architecture, art, and technology were made during the Old Kingdom, fueled by the increased agricultural productivity and resulting population growth, made possible by a well-developed central administration. Some of ancient Egypt's crowning achievements, the Giza pyramids and Great Sphinx, were constructed during the Old Kingdom. Under the direction of the vizier, state officials collected taxes, coordinated irrigation projects to improve crop yield, and drafted peasants to work on construction projects.

With the rise of central administration in Egypt, a new class of educated scribes and officials emerged and were granted estates by the king as payment for their services. Kings also made land grants to their mortuary cults and local temples, to ensure that these institutions had the resources to worship the king after his death. Scholars believe that five centuries of these practices slowly eroded the economic vitality of Egypt, and that the economy could no longer afford to support a large centralized administration. As the power of the kings diminished, regional governors called nomarchs began to challenge the supremacy of the office of king. This, coupled with severe droughts between 2200 and 2150 BC, is believed to have caused the country to enter the 140-year period of famine and strife known as the First Intermediate Period.

=== First Intermediate Period (2181–2055 BC) ===
After Egypt's central government collapsed at the end of the Old Kingdom, the administration could no longer support or stabilize the country's economy. The ensuing food shortages and political disputes escalated into famines and small-scale civil wars. Yet despite difficult problems, local leaders, owing no tribute to the king, used their new-found independence to establish a thriving culture in the provinces. Once in control of their own resources, the provinces became economically richer—which was demonstrated by larger and better burials among all social classes.

Free from their loyalties to the king, local rulers began competing with each other for territorial control and political power. By 2160 BC, rulers in Herakleopolis controlled Lower Egypt in the north, while a rival clan based in Thebes, the Intef family, took control of Upper Egypt in the south. As the Intefs grew in power and expanded their control northward, a clash between the two rival dynasties became inevitable. Around 2055 BC the northern Theban forces under Nebhepetre Mentuhotep II finally defeated the Herakleopolitan rulers, reuniting the Two Lands. They inaugurated a period of economic and cultural renaissance known as the Middle Kingdom.

=== Middle Kingdom (2134–1690 BC) ===
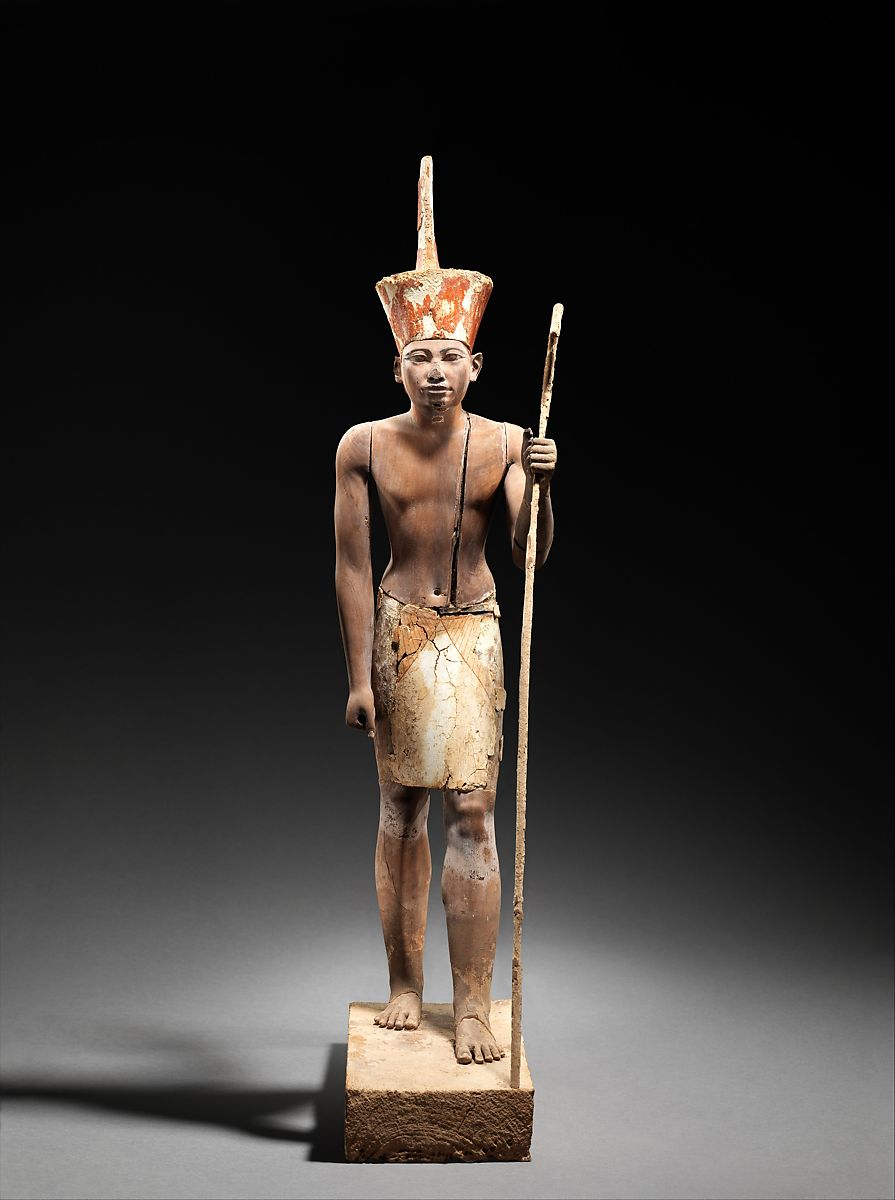
A figure wearing the red crown of Lower Egypt, most probably Amenemhat II or Senwosret II

The kings of the Middle Kingdom restored the country's stability, which saw a resurgence of art and monumental building projects, and a new flourishing of literature. Mentuhotep II and his Eleventh Dynasty successors ruled from Thebes, but the vizier Amenemhat I, upon assuming the kingship at the beginning of the Twelfth Dynasty around 1985 BC, shifted the kingdom's capital to the city of Itjtawy, located in Faiyum. From Itjtawy, the kings of the Twelfth Dynasty undertook a far-sighted land reclamation and irrigation scheme to increase agricultural output in the region. Moreover, the military reconquered territory in Nubia that was rich in quarries and gold mines, while laborers built a defensive structure in the Eastern Delta, called the "Walls of the Ruler", to defend against foreign attack.

With the kings having secured the country militarily and politically and with vast agricultural and mineral wealth at their disposal, the nation's population, arts, and religion flourished. The Middle Kingdom displayed an increase in expressions of personal piety toward the gods. Middle Kingdom literature featured sophisticated themes and characters written in a confident, eloquent style. The relief and portrait sculpture of the period captured subtle, individual details that reached new heights of technical sophistication.

=== Second Intermediate Period (1674–1549 BC) and the Hyksos ===
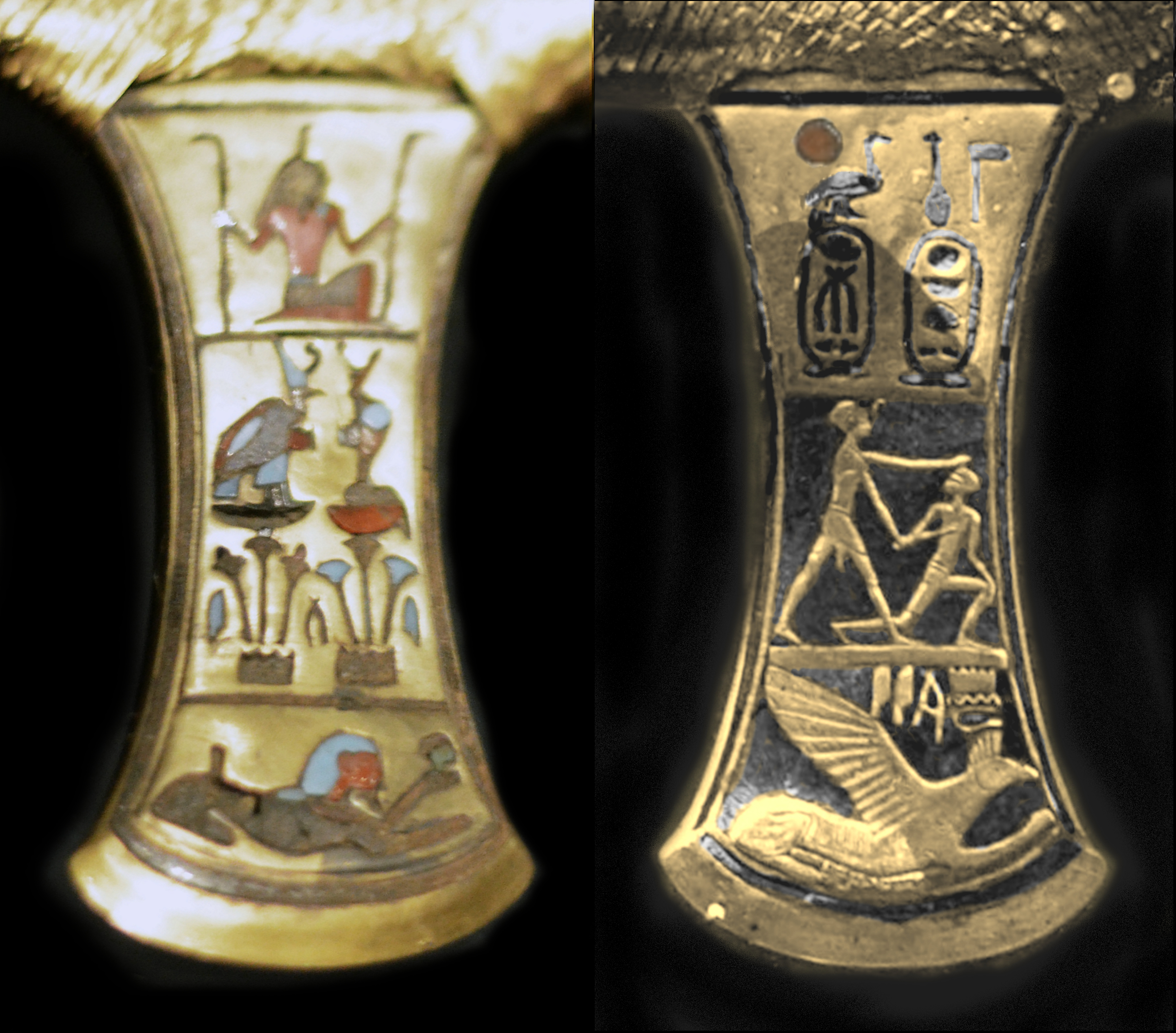
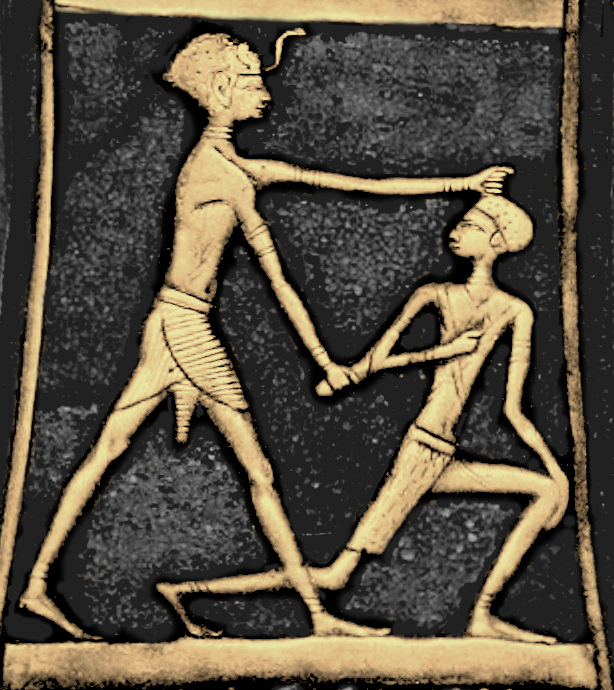
Pharaoh Ahmose I (ruled c. 1549–1524 BC) slaying a probable Hyksos. Detail of a ceremonial axe in the name of Ahmose I, treasure of Queen Ahhotep II.

Around 1785 BC, as the power of the Middle Kingdom kings weakened, a Western Asian people called the Hyksos, who had already settled in the Delta, seized control of Egypt and established their capital at Avaris, forcing the former central government to retreat to Thebes. The king was treated as a vassal and expected to pay tribute. The Hyksos ('foreign rulers') retained Egyptian models of government and identified as kings, thereby integrating Egyptian elements into their culture.

After retreating south, the native Theban kings found themselves trapped between the Canaanite Hyksos ruling the north and the Hyksos' Nubian allies, the Kushites, to the south. After years of vassalage, Thebes gathered enough strength to challenge the Hyksos in a conflict that lasted more than 30 years, until 1555 BC. Ahmose I waged a series of campaigns that permanently eradicated the Hyksos' presence in Egypt. He is considered the founder of the Eighteenth Dynasty, and the military became a central priority for his successors, who sought to expand Egypt's borders and attempted to gain mastery of the Near East.

=== New Kingdom (1549–1069 BC) ===
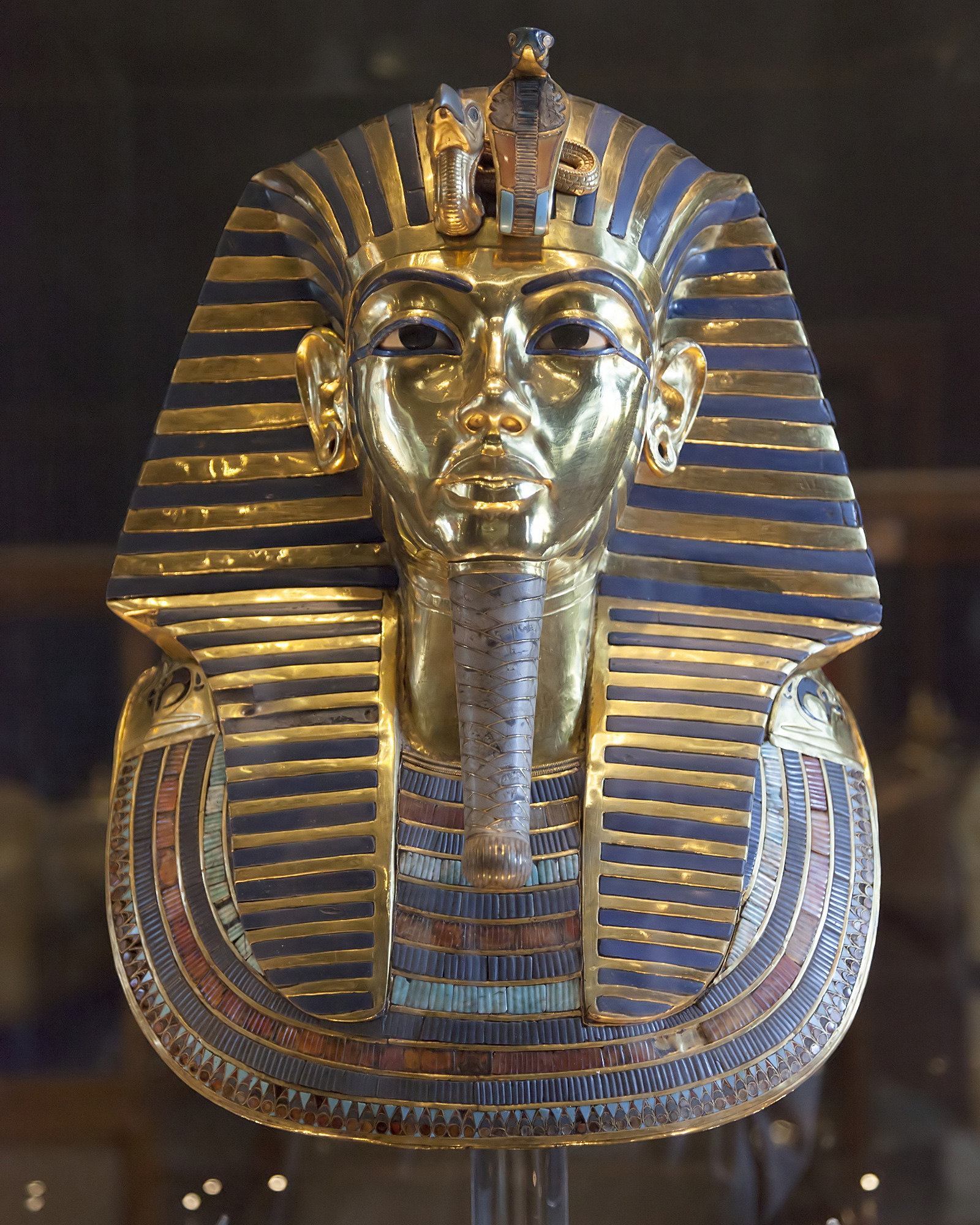
Pharaohs' tombs were provided with vast quantities of wealth, such as the golden mask from the mummy of Tutankhamun.

The New Kingdom pharaohs established a period of unprecedented prosperity by securing their borders and strengthening diplomatic ties with their neighbours, including the Mitanni Empire, Assyria, and Canaan. Military campaigns waged under Thutmose I and his grandson Thutmose III extended the influence of the pharaohs to the largest empire Egypt had ever seen.

Between their reigns, Hatshepsut, a queen who established herself as pharaoh, launched many building projects, including the restoration of temples damaged by the Hyksos, and sent trading expeditions to Punt and the Sinai. When Tuthmosis III died in 1425 BC, Egypt had an empire extending from Niya in north west Syria to the Fourth Cataract of the Nile in Nubia, cementing loyalties and opening access to critical imports such as bronze and wood.

The New Kingdom pharaohs began a large-scale building campaign to promote the god Amun, whose growing cult was based in Karnak. They also constructed monuments to glorify their own achievements, both real and imagined. The Karnak temple is the largest Egyptian temple ever built.

Around 1350 BC, the stability of the New Kingdom was threatened when Amenhotep IV ascended the throne and instituted a series of radical and chaotic reforms. Changing his name to Akhenaten, he touted the previously obscure sun deity Aten as the supreme deity, suppressed the worship of most other deities, and moved the capital to the new city of Akhetaten (modern-day Amarna). He was devoted to his new religion and artistic style. After his death, the cult of the Aten was quickly abandoned and the traditional religious order restored. The subsequent pharaohs, Tutankhamun, Ay, and Horemheb, worked to erase all mention of Akhenaten's heresy, now known as the Amarna Period.

Around 1279 BC, Ramesses II, also known as Ramesses the Great, ascended the throne, and went on to build more temples, erect more statues and obelisks, and sire more children than any other pharaoh in history. (Note: With his two principal wives and large harem, Ramesses II sired more than 100 children. (Clayton (1994), p. 146)) A bold military leader, Ramesses II led his army against the Hittites in the Battle of Kadesh (in modern Syria) and, after fighting to a stalemate, finally agreed to the first recorded peace treaty, around 1258 BC.

Egypt's wealth, however, made it a tempting target for invasion, particularly by the Libyan Berbers to the west, and the Sea Peoples, a conjectured confederation of seafarers from the Aegean Sea. (Note: From Killebrew & Lehmann (2013), p. 2: "First coined in 1881 by the French Egyptologist G. Maspero (1896), the somewhat misleading term "Sea Peoples" encompasses the ethnonyms Lukka, Sherden, Shekelesh, Teresh, Eqwesh, Denyen, Sikil / Tjekker, Weshesh, and Peleset (Philistines). Footnote: The modern term "Sea Peoples" refers to peoples that appear in several New Kingdom Egyptian texts as originating from "islands"... The use of quotation marks in association with the term "Sea Peoples" in our title is intended to draw attention to the problematic nature of this commonly used term. It is noteworthy that the designation "of the sea" appears only in relation to the Sherden, Shekelesh, and Eqwesh. Subsequently, this term was applied somewhat indiscriminately to several additional ethnonyms, including the Philistines, who are portrayed in their earliest appearance as invaders from the north during the reigns of Merenptah and Ramesses III.": From Drews (1993), pp. 48–61: "The thesis that a great "migration of the Sea Peoples" occurred ca. 1200 B.C. is supposedly based on Egyptian inscriptions, one from the reign of Merneptah and another from the reign of Ramesses III. Yet in the inscriptions themselves such a migration nowhere appears. After reviewing what the Egyptian texts have to say about 'the sea peoples', one Egyptologist (Wolfgang Helck) recently remarked that although some things are unclear, "eins ist aber sicher: Nach den agyptischen Texten haben wir es nicht mit einer 'Volkerwanderung' zu tun." Thus the migration hypothesis is based not on the inscriptions themselves but on their interpretation.") Initially, the military was able to repel these invasions, but Egypt eventually lost control of its remaining territories in southern Canaan, much of it falling to the Assyrians. The effects of external threats were exacerbated by internal problems such as corruption, tomb robbery, and civil unrest. After regaining their power, the high priests at the temple of Amun in Thebes accumulated vast tracts of land and wealth, and their expanded power splintered the country during the Third Intermediate Period.

=== Third Intermediate Period (1069–653 BC) ===
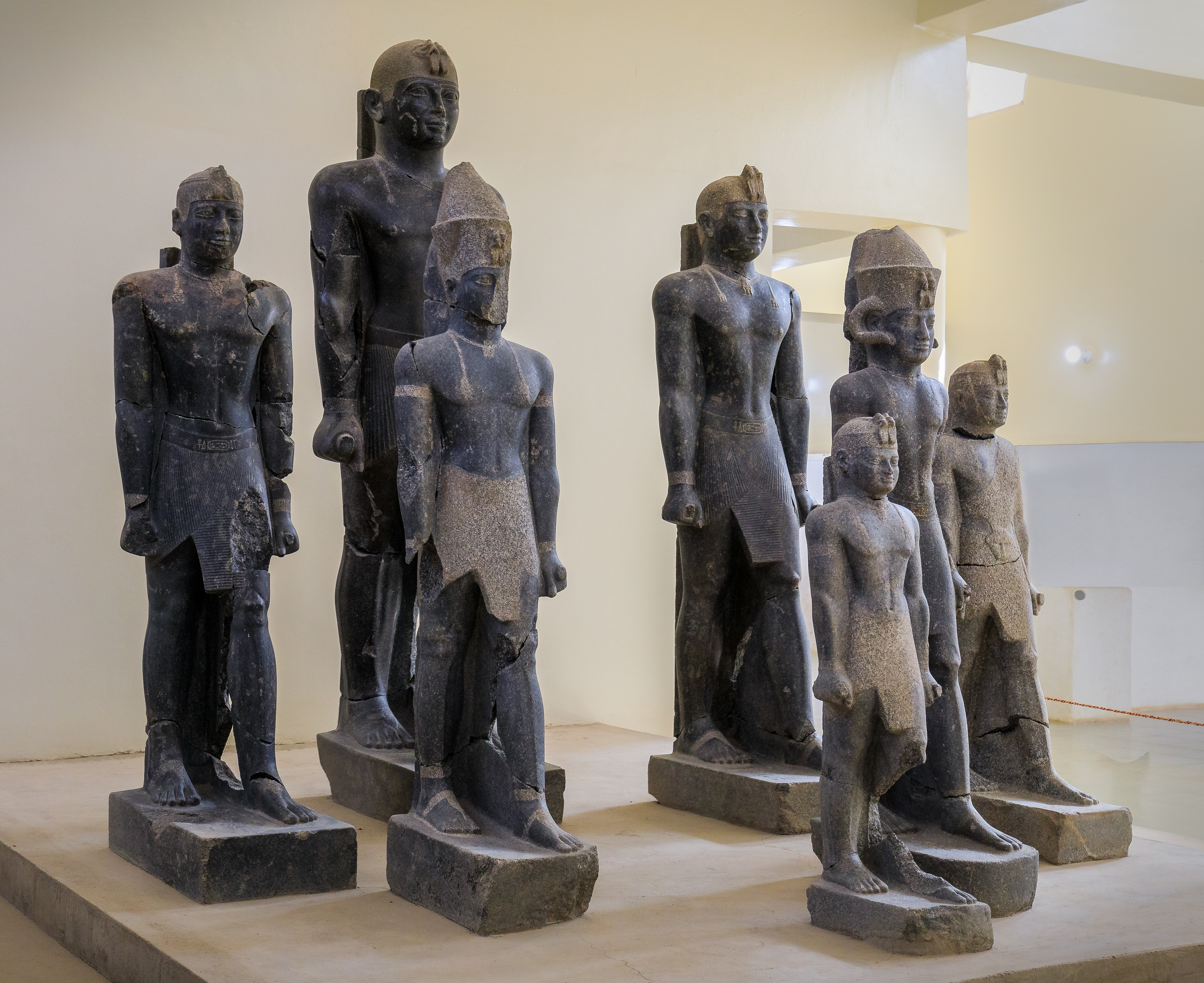
Statues of two pharaohs of Egypt's Twenty-Fifth Dynasty and several other Kushite kings, Kerma Museum

Following the death of Ramesses XI in 1078 BC, Smendes assumed authority over the northern part of Egypt, ruling from the city of Tanis. The south was effectively controlled by the High Priests of Amun at Thebes, who recognized Smendes in name only. During this time, Libyans had been settling in the western delta, and chieftains of these settlers began increasing their autonomy. Libyan princes took control of the delta under Shoshenq I in 945 BC, founding the so-called Libyan or Bubastite dynasty that would rule for some 200 years. Shoshenq also gained control of southern Egypt by placing his family members in important priestly positions. Libyan control began to erode as a rival dynasty in the delta arose in Leontopolis, and Kushites threatened from the south.

Around 727 BC the Kushite king Piye invaded northward, seizing control of Thebes and eventually the Delta, which established the 25th Dynasty. During the 25th Dynasty, Pharaoh Taharqa created an empire nearly as large as the New Kingdom's. Twenty-fifth Dynasty pharaohs built, or restored, temples and monuments throughout the Nile valley, including at Memphis, Karnak, Kawa, and Jebel Barkal. During this period, the Nile valley saw the first widespread construction of pyramids (many in modern Sudan) since the Middle Kingdom.

Egypt's far-reaching prestige declined considerably toward the end of the Third Intermediate Period. Its foreign allies had fallen into the Assyrian sphere of influence, and by 700 BC war between the two states became inevitable. Between 671 and 667 BC the Assyrians began the Assyrian conquest of Egypt. The reigns of both Taharqa and his successor, Tanutamun, were filled with frequent conflict with the Assyrians. Ultimately, the Assyrians pushed the Kushites back into Nubia, occupied Memphis, and sacked the temples of Thebes.

=== Late Period (653–332 BC) ===
The Assyrians left control of Egypt to a series of vassals who became known as the Saite kings of the Twenty-Sixth Dynasty. By 653 BC, the Saite king Psamtik I was able to oust the Assyrians with the help of Greek mercenaries, who were recruited to form Egypt's first navy. Greek influence expanded greatly as the city-state of Naucratis became the home of Greeks in the Nile Delta. The Saite kings based in the new capital of Sais witnessed a brief but spirited resurgence in the economy and culture, but in 525 BC, the Persian Empire, led by Cambyses II, began its conquest of Egypt, eventually defeating the pharaoh Psamtik III at the Battle of Pelusium. Cambyses II then assumed the formal title of pharaoh, but ruled Egypt from Iran, leaving Egypt under the control of a satrap. A few revolts against the Persians marked the 5th century BC, but Egypt was unable to overthrow the Persians until the end of the century.

Following its annexation by Persia, Egypt was joined with Cyprus and Phoenicia in the sixth satrapy of the Achaemenid Persian Empire. This first period of Persian rule over Egypt, also known as the Twenty-Seventh Dynasty, ended in 402 BC, when Egypt regained independence under a series of native dynasties. The last of these dynasties, the Thirtieth, proved to be the last native royal house of ancient Egypt, ending with the kingship of Nectanebo II. A brief restoration of Persian rule, sometimes known as the Thirty-First Dynasty, began in 343 BC, but shortly after, in 332 BC, the Persian ruler Mazaces handed Egypt over to Alexander the Great without a fight.

=== Ptolemaic period (332–30 BC) ===
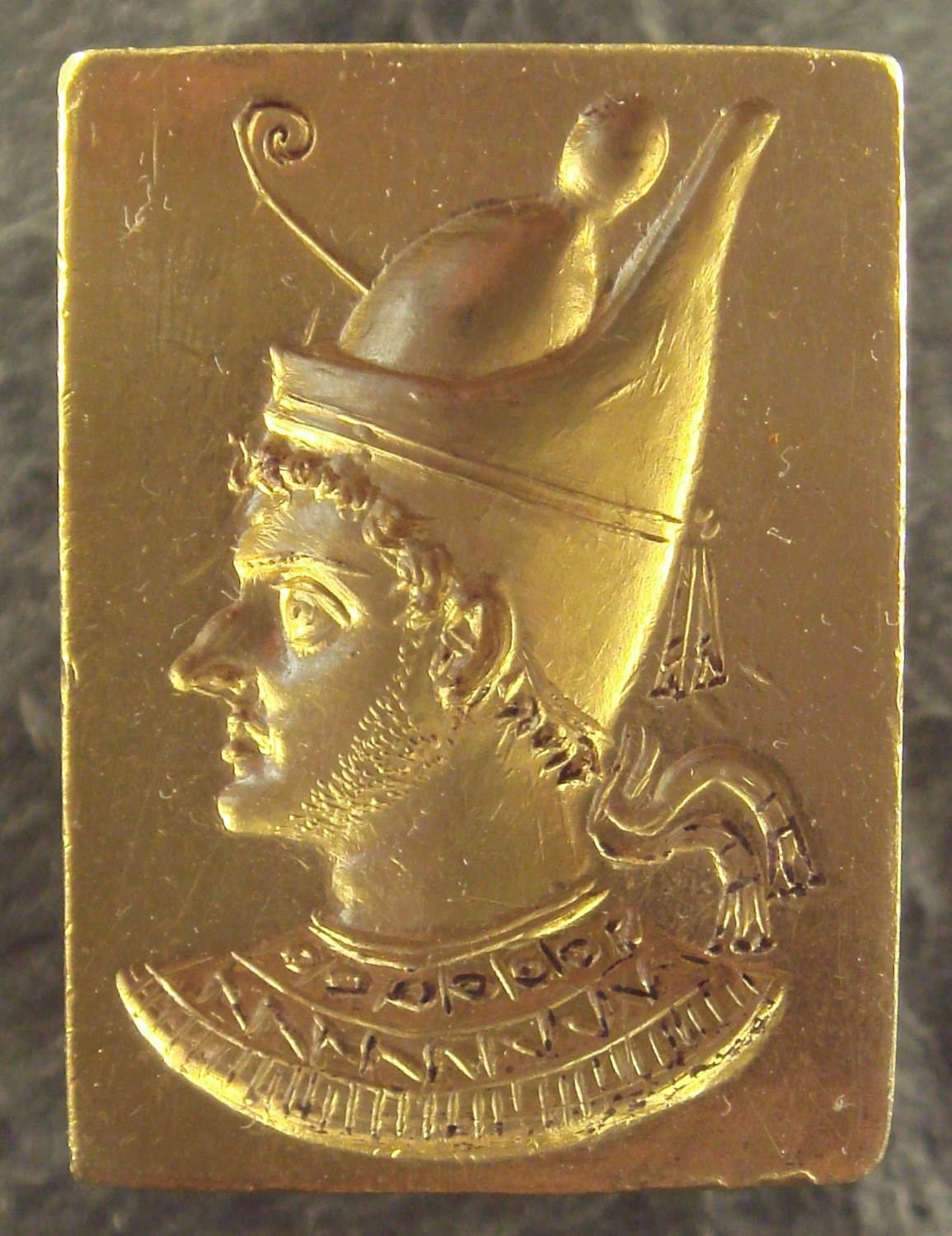
Portrait of Ptolemy VI Philometor wearing the double crown of Egypt

In 332 BC, Alexander the Great conquered Egypt with little resistance from the Persians and was welcomed by the Egyptians as a deliverer. The administration established by Alexander's successors, the Macedonian Ptolemaic Kingdom, was based on an Egyptian model and based in the new capital city of Alexandria. The city showcased the power and prestige of Hellenistic rule, and became a centre of learning and culture that included the famous Library of Alexandria and the Mouseion. The Lighthouse of Alexandria lit the way for the many ships that kept trade flowing through the city—as the Ptolemies made commerce and revenue-generating enterprises, such as papyrus manufacturing, their top priority.

Hellenistic culture did not supplant native Egyptian culture, as the Ptolemies supported time-honored traditions in an effort to secure the loyalty of the populace. They built new temples in Egyptian style, supported traditional cults, and portrayed themselves as pharaohs. Some traditions merged, as Greek and Egyptian gods were syncretized into composite deities, such as Serapis, and classical Greek forms of sculpture influenced traditional Egyptian motifs. Despite their efforts to appease the Egyptians, the Ptolemies were challenged by native rebellion, bitter family rivalries, and frequent mob violence in Alexandria. In addition, as Rome relied more heavily on imports of grain from Egypt, the Romans took great interest in the political situation in the country. Continued Egyptian revolts, ambitious politicians, and powerful opponents from the Near East made this situation unstable, leading Rome to send forces to secure the country as a province of its empire.

=== Roman period (30 BC – AD 642) ===
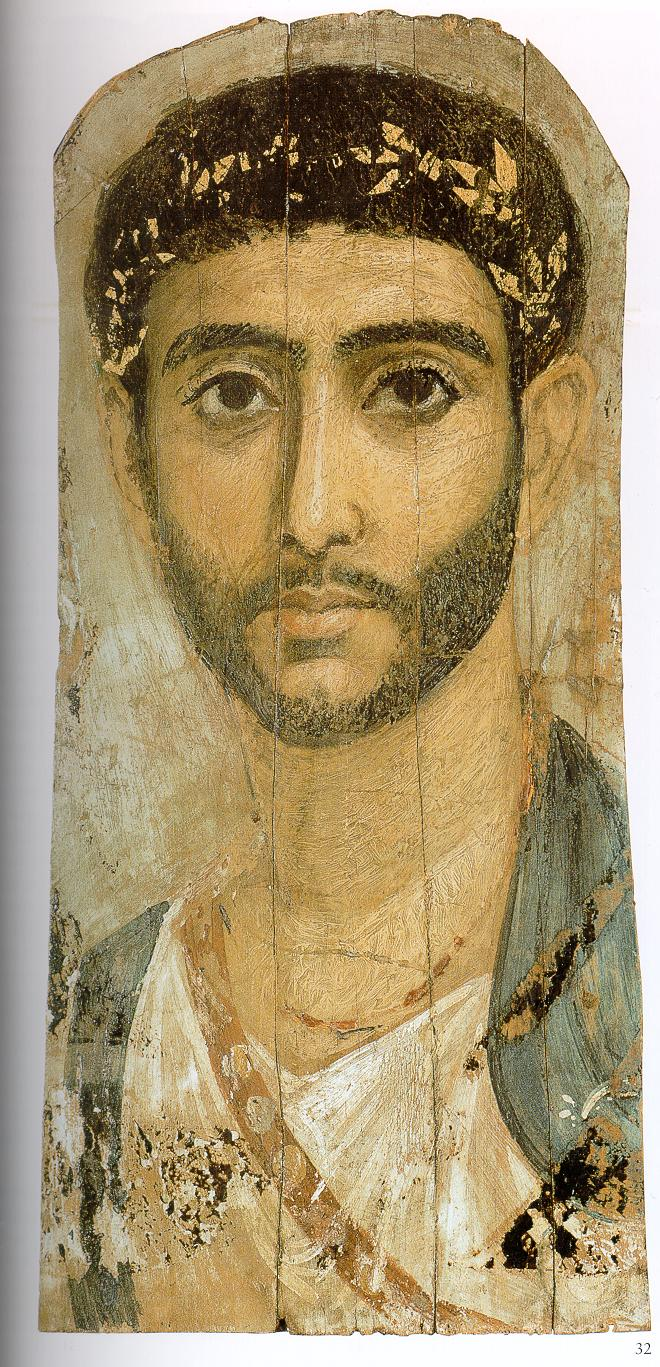
The Fayum mummy portraits epitomize the meeting of Egyptian and Roman cultures.

Egypt became a province of the Roman Empire in 30 BC, following the defeat of Mark Antony and Ptolemaic Queen Cleopatra VII by Octavian (later Emperor Augustus) in the Battle of Actium. The Romans relied heavily on grain shipments from Egypt, and the Roman army, under the control of a prefect appointed by the emperor, quelled rebellions, strictly enforced the collection of heavy taxes, and prevented attacks by bandits, which had become a notorious problem during the period. Alexandria became an increasingly important center on the trade route with the orient, as exotic luxuries were in high demand in Rome.

Upper Egypt frequently operated with a degree of de facto independence due to its distance from Alexandria, its strong local priesthoods, and active resistance to Roman rule, like the Revolt of Thebes (c. 30–29 BC), which took place immediately following the war. The region near the southern border maintained a unique position, acting as a bridge to Nubia, with local elites sometimes exerting control over the Eastern Desert.

Although the Romans had a more hostile attitude than the Greeks towards the Egyptians, some traditions such as mummification and worship of the traditional gods continued. The art of mummy portraiture flourished, and some Roman emperors had themselves depicted as pharaohs, though not to the extent that the Ptolemies had. The former lived outside Egypt and did not perform the ceremonial functions of Egyptian kingship. Local administration became Roman in style and closed to native Egyptians.

From the mid-first century AD, Christianity took root in Egypt and it was originally seen as another cult that could be accepted. However, it was an uncompromising religion that sought to win converts from the pagan Egyptian and Greco-Roman religions and threatened popular religious traditions. This led to the persecution of converts to Christianity, culminating in the great purges of Diocletian starting in 303, but eventually Christianity won out. In 391, the Christian emperor Theodosius I introduced legislation that banned pagan rites and closed temples. Alexandria became the scene of great anti-pagan riots with public and private religious imagery destroyed. As a consequence, Egypt's native religious culture was continually in decline. While the native population continued to speak their language, the ability to read hieroglyphic writing slowly disappeared as the role of the Egyptian temple priests and priestesses diminished. The temples themselves were sometimes converted to churches or abandoned to the desert.

== Government and economy ==
=== Administration and commerce ===
The pharaoh was the absolute monarch of the country and, at least in theory, wielded complete control of the land and its resources. The king was the supreme military commander and head of the government, who relied on a bureaucracy of officials to manage his affairs. In charge of the administration was his second in command, the vizier, who acted as the king's representative and coordinated land surveys, the treasury, building projects, the legal system, and the archives. At a regional level, the country was divided into as many as 42 administrative regions called nomes each governed by a nomarch, who was accountable to the vizier for his jurisdiction. The temples formed the backbone of the economy. Not only were they places of worship, but were also responsible for collecting and storing the kingdom's wealth in a system of granaries and treasuries administered by overseers, who redistributed grain and goods.

Much of the economy was centrally organized and strictly controlled. Although the ancient Egyptians did not use coinage until the Late period, they did use a type of money-barter system, with standard sacks of grain and the deben, a weight of roughly 91 g (3 oz) of copper or silver, forming a common denominator. Workers were paid in grain: A simple laborer might earn 5 1/2 sacks or ca. 200 kg (440 lb) of grain per month, while a foreman might earn 7 1/2 sacks or roughly 250 kg (550 lb). Prices were fixed across the country and recorded in lists to facilitate trading; for example a shirt cost five copper deben, while a cow cost 140 deben. Grain could be traded for other goods, according to the fixed price list. During the fifth century BC coined money was introduced into Egypt from abroad. At first the coins were used as standardized pieces of precious metal rather than true money, but in the following centuries international traders came to rely on coinage.

=== Social status ===
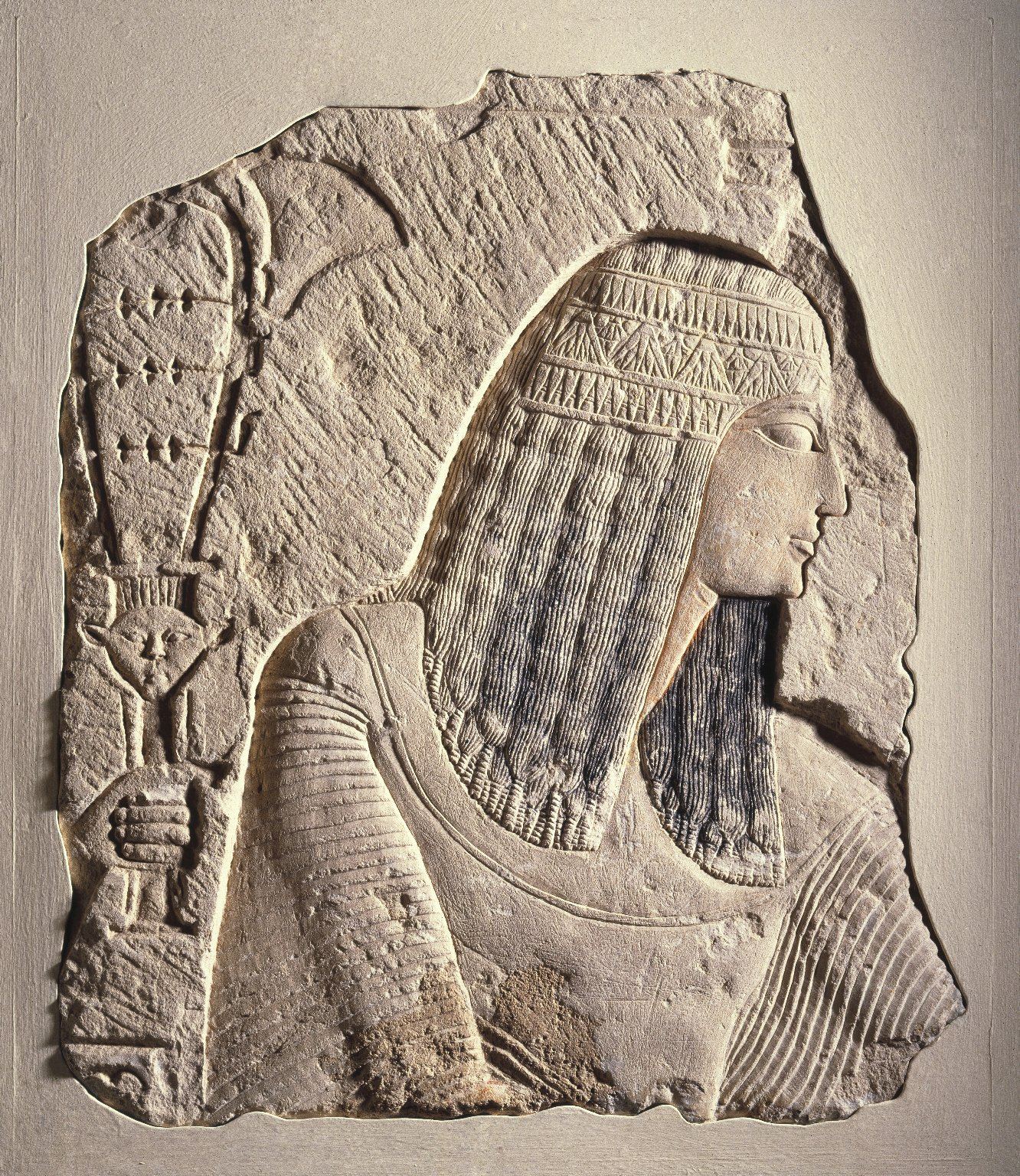
Painted limestone relief of a noble member of Ancient Egyptian society during the New Kingdom

Egyptian society was highly stratified, and social status was expressly displayed. Farmers made up the bulk of the population, but agricultural produce was owned directly by the state, temple, or noble family that owned the land. Farmers were also subject to a labor tax and were required to work on irrigation or construction projects in a corvée system. Artists and craftsmen were of higher status than farmers, but they were also under state control, working in the shops attached to the temples and paid directly from the state treasury. Scribes and officials formed the upper class in ancient Egypt, known as the "white kilt class" in reference to the bleached linen garments that served as a mark of their rank. The upper class prominently displayed their social status in art and literature. Below the nobility were the priests, physicians, and engineers with specialized training in their field. It is unclear whether slavery as understood today existed in ancient Egypt; there is difference of opinions among authors.

The ancient Egyptians viewed men and women, including people from all social classes, as essentially equal under the law, and even the lowliest peasant was entitled to petition the vizier and his court for redress. Although slaves were mostly used as indentured servants, they were able to buy and sell their servitude, work their way to freedom or nobility, and were usually treated by doctors in the workplace. Both men and women had the right to own and sell property, make contracts, marry and divorce, receive inheritance, and pursue legal disputes in court. Married couples could own property jointly and protect themselves from divorce by agreeing to marriage contracts, which stipulated the financial obligations of the husband to his wife and children should the marriage end. Compared with their counterparts in ancient Greece, Rome, and even more modern places around the world, ancient Egyptian women had a greater range of personal choices, legal rights, and opportunities for achievement. Women such as Hatshepsut and Cleopatra VII even became pharaohs, while others wielded power as Divine Wives of Amun. Despite these freedoms, ancient Egyptian women did not often take part in official roles in the administration, aside from the royal high priestesses, apparently served only secondary roles in the temples (not much data for many dynasties), and were less likely to be as educated as men.

=== Legal system ===
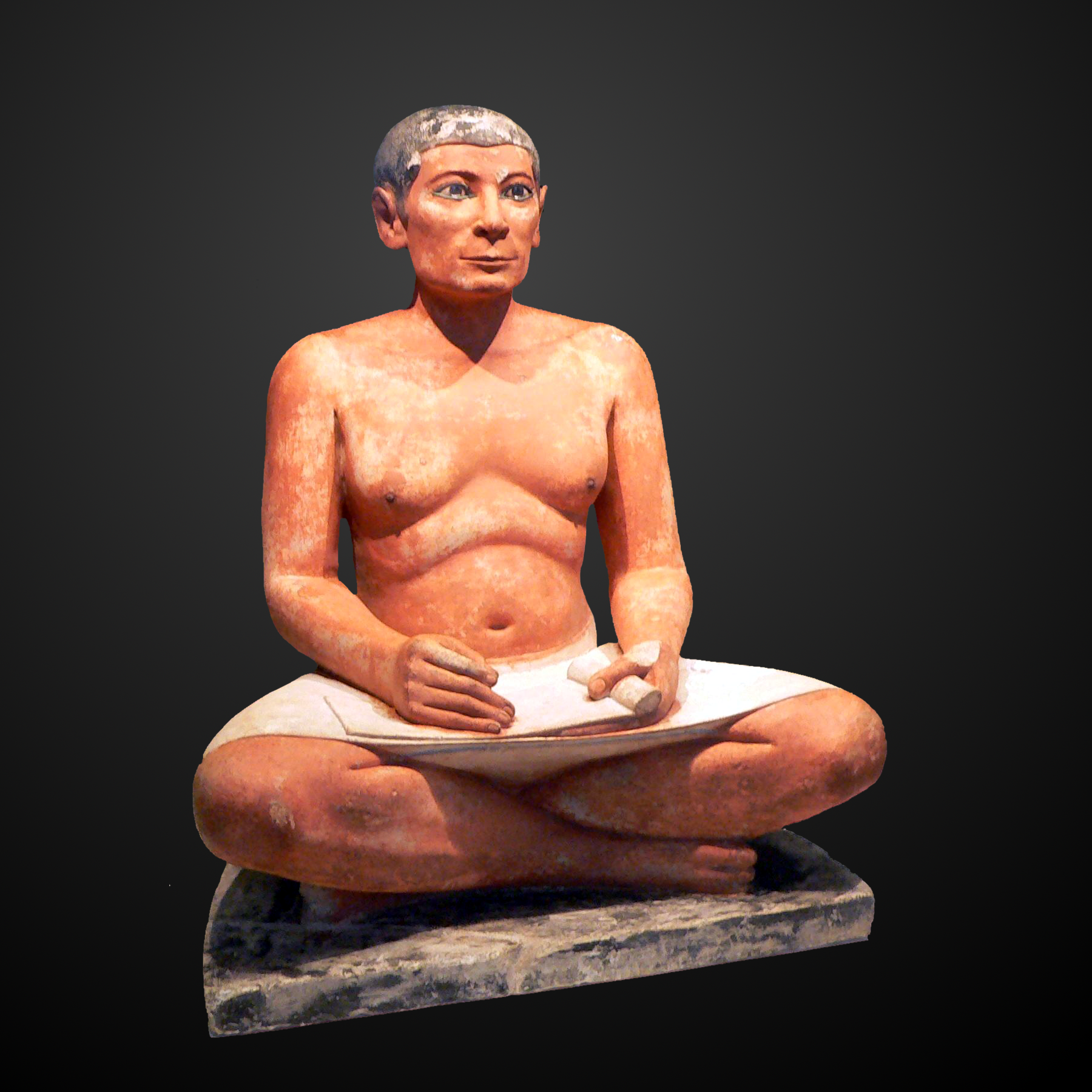
The Seated Scribe from Saqqara, 5th dynasty

The head of the legal system was officially the pharaoh, who was responsible for enacting laws, delivering justice, and maintaining law and order, a concept the ancient Egyptians referred to as Ma'at. Although no legal codes from ancient Egypt survive, court documents show that Egyptian law was based on a common-sense view of right and wrong that emphasized reaching agreements and resolving conflicts rather than strictly adhering to a complicated set of statutes. Local councils of elders, known as Kenbet in the New Kingdom, were responsible for ruling in court cases involving small claims and minor disputes. More serious cases involving murder, major land transactions, and tomb robbery were referred to the Great Kenbet, over which the vizier or pharaoh presided. Plaintiffs and defendants were expected to represent themselves and were required to swear an oath that they had told the truth. In some cases, the state took on both the role of prosecutor and judge, and it could torture the accused with beatings to obtain a confession and the names of any co-conspirators. Whether the charges were trivial or serious, court scribes documented the complaint, testimony, and verdict of the case for future reference.

Punishment for minor crimes involved either imposition of fines, beatings, facial mutilation, or exile, depending on the severity of the offense. Serious crimes such as murder and tomb robbery were punished by execution, carried out by decapitation, drowning, or impaling the criminal on a stake. Punishment could also be extended to the criminal's family. Beginning in the New Kingdom, oracles played a major role in the legal system, dispensing justice in both civil and criminal cases. The procedure was to ask the god a "yes" or "no" question concerning the right or wrong of an issue. The god, carried by a number of priests, rendered judgement by choosing one or the other, moving forward or backward, or pointing to one of the answers written on a piece of papyrus or an ostracon.

=== Agriculture ===
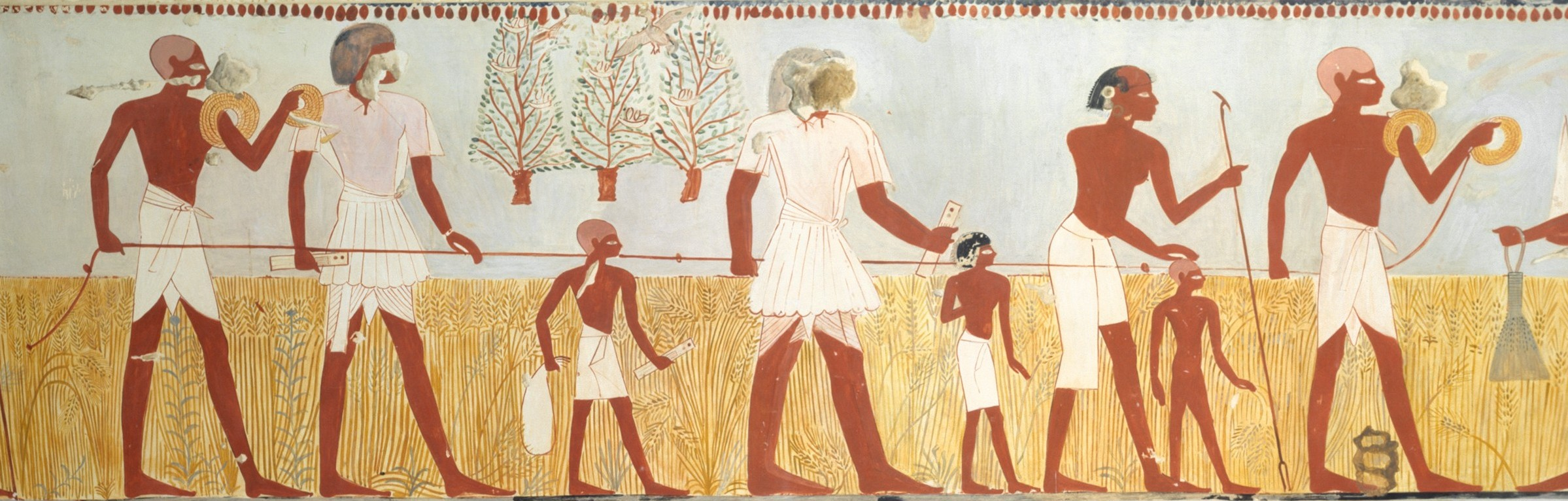
Measuring and recording the harvest, from the tomb of Menna at Thebes (Eighteenth Dynasty)

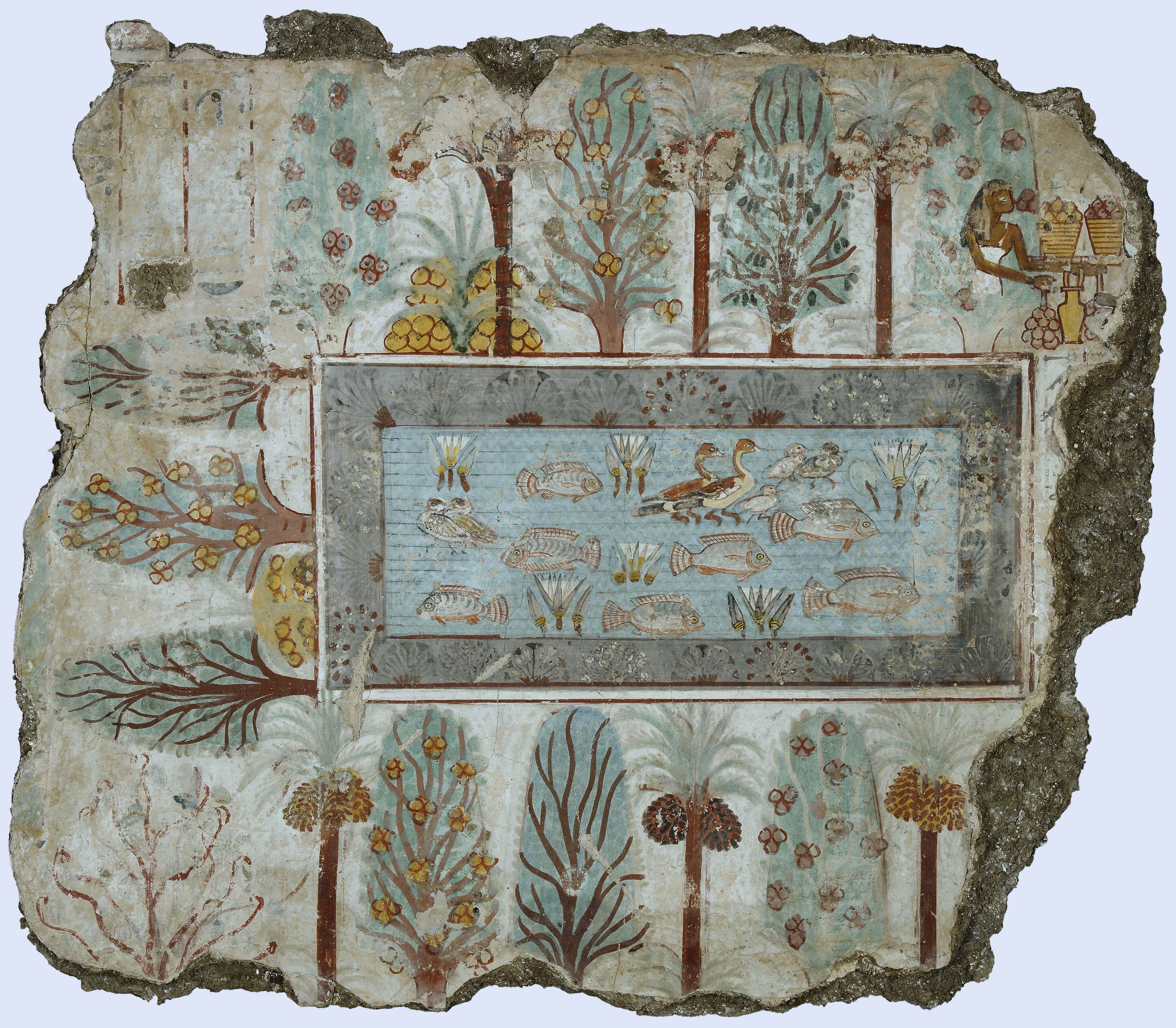
Rectangular fishpond with ducks and lotus planted round with date palms and fruit trees, Tomb of Nebamun, Thebes, 18th Dynasty

A combination of favorable geographical features contributed to the success of ancient Egyptian culture, the most important of which was the rich fertile soil resulting from annual inundations of the Nile River. The ancient Egyptians were thus able to produce an abundance of food, allowing the population to devote more time and resources to cultural, technological, and artistic pursuits. Land management was crucial in ancient Egypt because taxes were assessed based on the amount of land a person owned.

Farming in Egypt was dependent on the cycle of the Nile River. The Egyptians recognized three seasons: Akhet (flooding), Peret (planting), and Shemu (harvesting). The flooding season lasted from June to September, depositing on the river's banks a layer of mineral-rich silt ideal for growing crops. After the floodwaters had receded, the growing season lasted from October to February. Farmers plowed and planted seeds in the fields, which were irrigated with ditches and canals. Egypt received little rainfall, so farmers relied on the Nile to water their crops. From March to May, farmers used sickles to harvest their crops, which were then threshed with a flail to separate the straw from the grain. Winnowing removed the chaff from the grain, and the grain was then ground into flour, brewed to make beer, or stored for later use.

The ancient Egyptians cultivated emmer and barley, and several other cereal grains, all of which were used to make the two main food staples of bread and beer. Flax plants, uprooted before they started flowering, were grown for the fibers of their stems. These fibers were split along their length and spun into thread, which was used to weave sheets of linen and to make clothing. Papyrus growing on the banks of the Nile River was used to make paper. Vegetables and fruits were grown in garden plots, close to habitations and on higher ground, and had to be watered by hand. Vegetables included leeks, garlic, melons, squashes, pulses, lettuce, and other crops, in addition to grapes that were made into wine.

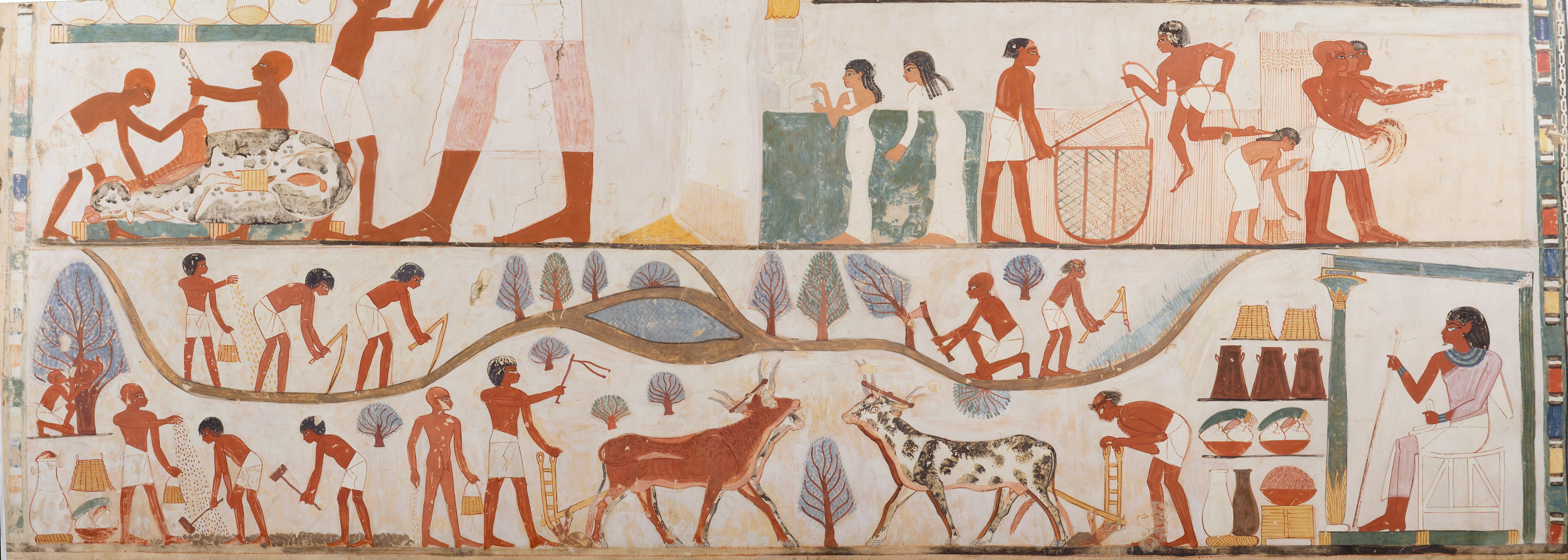
A tomb relief depicts workers plowing the fields, harvesting the crops, and threshing the grain under the direction of an overseer, painting in the tomb of Nakht.

==== Animals ====
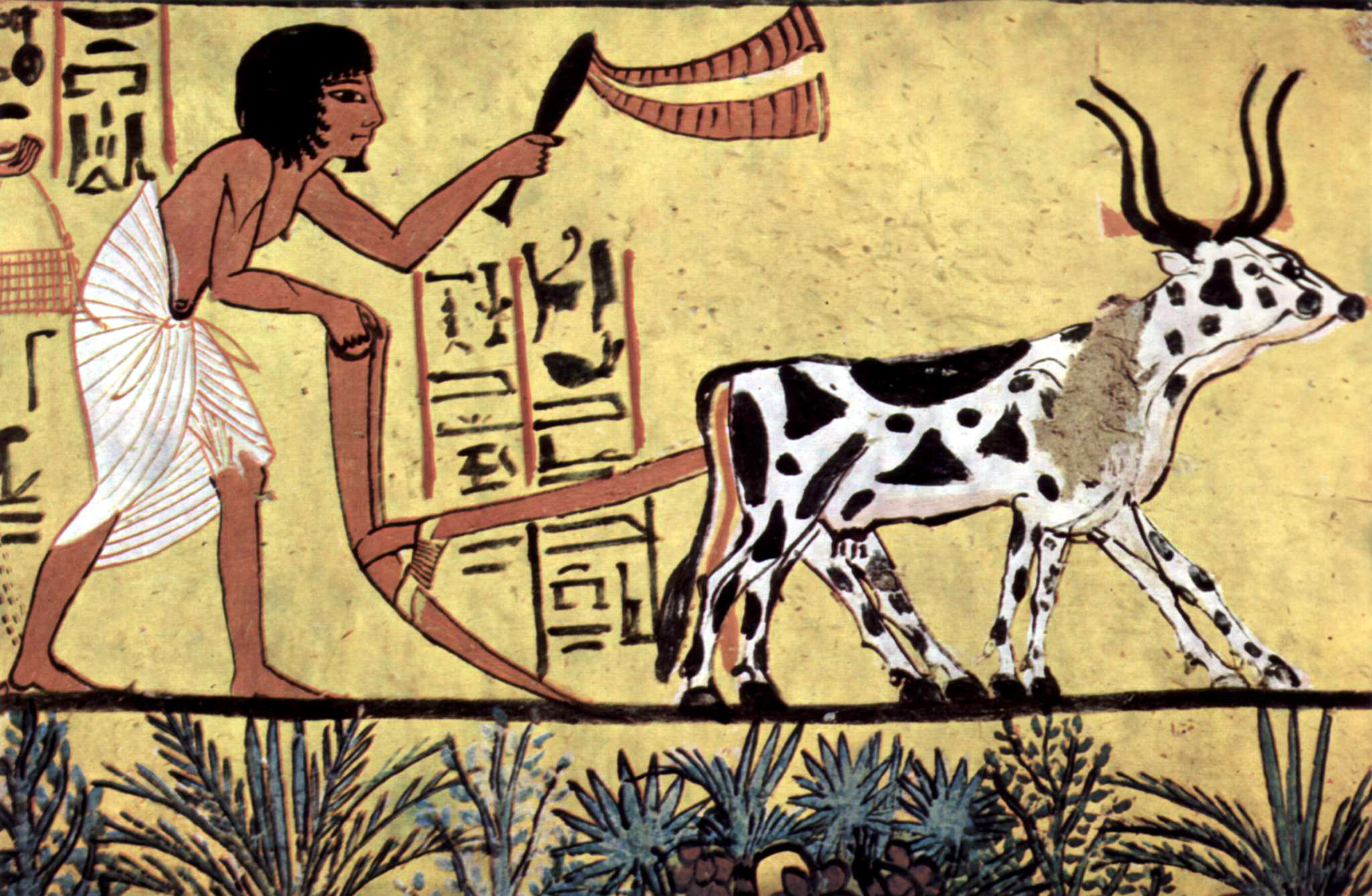
Sennedjem plows his fields in Aaru with a pair of oxen, Deir el-Medina.

The Egyptians believed that a balanced relationship between people and animals was an essential element of the cosmic order; thus humans, animals and plants were believed to be members of a single whole. Animals, both domesticated and wild, were therefore a critical source of spirituality, companionship, and sustenance to the ancient Egyptians. Cattle were the most important livestock; the administration collected taxes on livestock in regular censuses, and the size of a herd reflected the prestige and importance of the estate or temple that owned them. In addition to cattle, the ancient Egyptians kept sheep, goats, and pigs. Poultry, such as ducks, geese, and pigeons, were captured in nets and bred on farms, where they were force-fed with dough to fatten them. The Nile provided a plentiful source of fish. Bees were also domesticated from at least the Old Kingdom, and provided both honey and wax.

The ancient Egyptians used donkeys and oxen as beasts of burden, and they were responsible for plowing the fields and trampling seed into the soil. The slaughter of a fattened ox was also a central part of an offering ritual. Horses were introduced by the Hyksos in the Second Intermediate Period. Camels, although known from the New Kingdom, were not used as beasts of burden until the Late Period. There is also evidence to suggest that elephants were briefly used in the Late Period but largely abandoned due to lack of grazing land. Cats, dogs, and monkeys were common family pets, while more exotic pets imported from the heart of Africa, such as Sub-Saharan African lions, were reserved for royalty. Herodotus observed that the Egyptians were the only people to keep their animals with them in their houses. During the Late Period, the worship of the gods in their animal form was extremely popular, such as the cat goddess Bastet and the ibis god Thoth, and these animals were kept in large numbers for the purpose of ritual sacrifice.

=== Natural resources ===
Egypt is rich in building and decorative stone, copper and lead ores, gold, and semiprecious stones. These natural resources allowed the ancient Egyptians to build monuments, sculpt statues, make tools, and fashion jewelry. Embalmers used salts from the Wadi Natrun for mummification, which also provided the gypsum needed to make plaster. Ore-bearing rock formations were found in distant, inhospitable wadis in the Eastern Desert and the Sinai, requiring large, state-controlled expeditions to obtain natural resources found there. There were extensive gold mines in Nubia, and one of the first maps known is of a gold mine in this region. The Wadi Hammamat was a notable source of granite, greywacke, and gold. Flint was the first mineral collected and used to make tools, and flint handaxes are the earliest pieces of evidence of habitation in the Nile valley. Nodules of the mineral were carefully flaked to make blades and arrowheads of moderate hardness and durability even after copper was adopted for this purpose. Ancient Egyptians were among the first to use minerals such as sulfur as cosmetic substances.

The Egyptians worked deposits of the lead ore galena at Gebel Rosas to make net sinkers, plumb bobs, and small figurines. Copper was the most important metal for toolmaking in ancient Egypt and was smelted in furnaces from malachite ore mined in the Sinai. Workers collected gold by washing the nuggets out of sediment in alluvial deposits, or by the more labor-intensive process of grinding and washing gold-bearing quartzite. Iron deposits found in upper Egypt were used in the Late Period. High-quality building stones were abundant in Egypt; the ancient Egyptians quarried limestone all along the Nile valley, granite from Aswan, and basalt and sandstone from the wadis of the Eastern Desert. Deposits of decorative stones such as porphyry, greywacke, alabaster, and carnelian dotted the Eastern Desert and were collected even before the First Dynasty. In the Ptolemaic and Roman Periods, miners worked deposits of emeralds in Wadi Sikait and amethyst in Wadi el-Hudi.

=== Trade ===
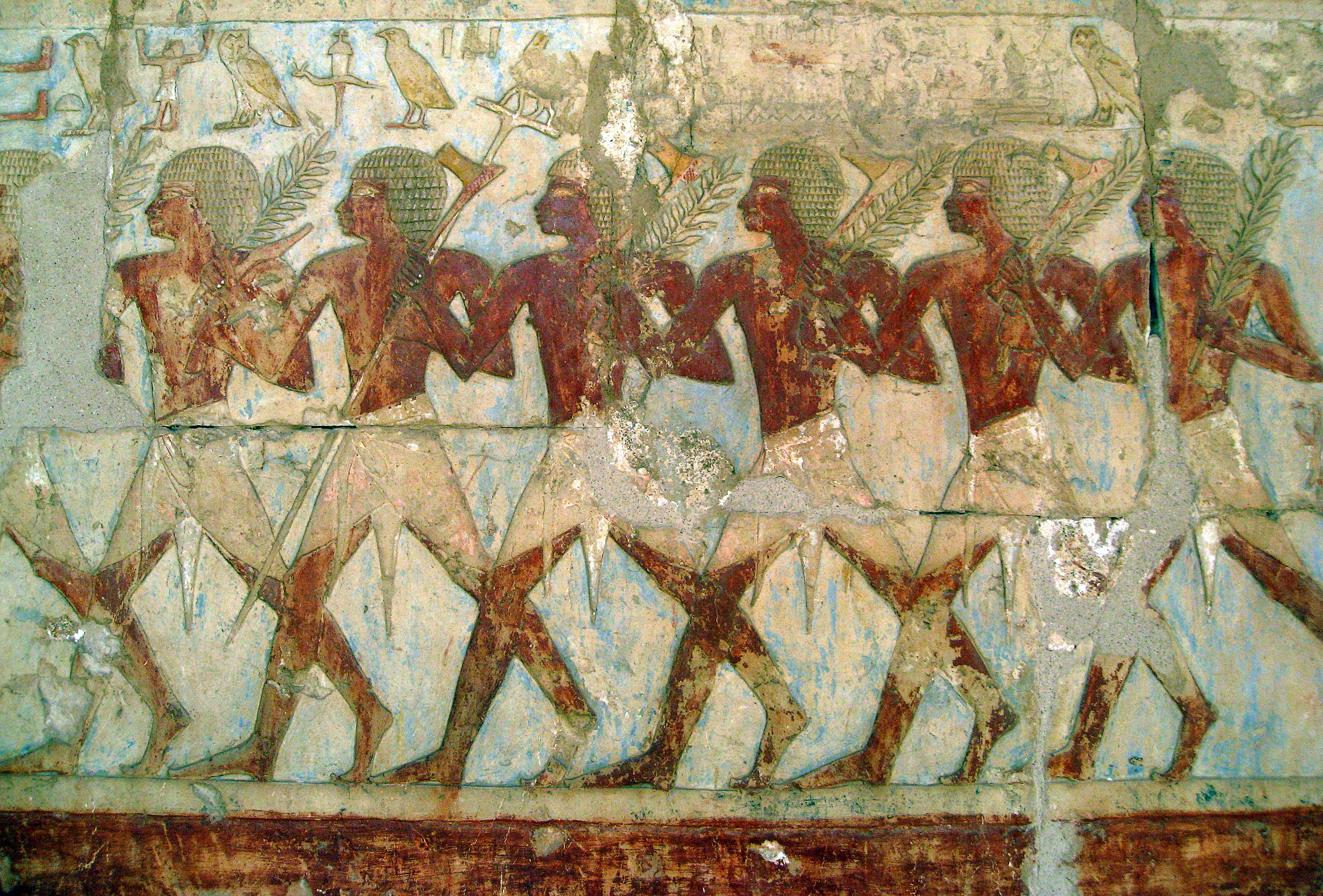
Hatshepsut's trading expedition to the Land of Punt

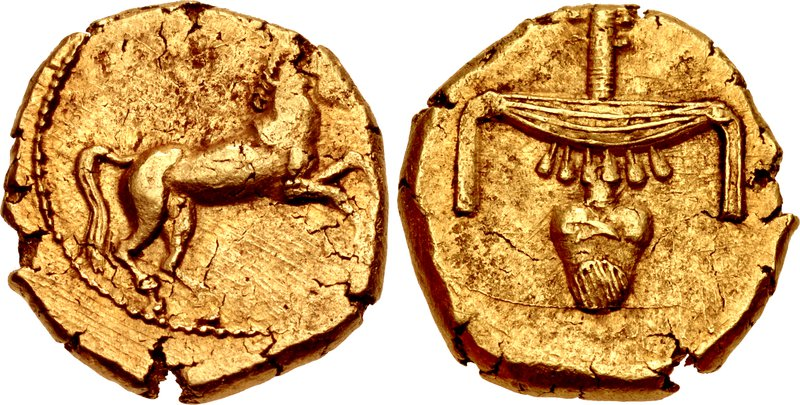
Egyptian gold stater of Nectanebo II: reverse with hieroglyphs nfr-nb minted in Egypt (around 360 BC).

The ancient Egyptians engaged in trade with their foreign neighbors to obtain rare, exotic goods not found in Egypt. In the Predynastic Period, they established trade with Nubia to obtain gold and incense. They also established trade with Palestine, as evidenced by Palestinian-style oil jugs found in the burials of the First Dynasty pharaohs. An Egyptian colony stationed in southern Canaan dates to slightly before the First Dynasty. Tell es-Sakan in present-day Gaza was established as an Egyptian settlement in the late 4th millennium BC, and is theorised to have been the main Egyptian colonial site in the region. Narmer had Egyptian pottery produced in Canaan and exported back to Egypt.

By the Second Dynasty at latest, ancient Egyptian trade with Byblos yielded a critical source of quality timber not found in Egypt. By the Fifth Dynasty, trade with Punt provided gold, aromatic resins, ebony, ivory, and wild animals such as monkeys and baboons. Egypt relied on trade with Anatolia for essential quantities of tin as well as supplementary supplies of copper, both metals being necessary for the manufacture of bronze. The ancient Egyptians prized the blue stone lapis lazuli, which had to be imported from far-away Afghanistan. Egypt's Mediterranean trade partners also included Greece and Crete, which provided, among other goods, supplies of olive oil.

== Language ==
=== Historical development ===
r Z1 n km m t O49
r n kmt
'Egyptian language'
in hieroglyphs

The Egyptian language is a northern Afro-Asiatic language closely related to the Berber and Semitic languages. The Ancient Egyptian language likewise shared linguistic ties with other Afro-Asiatic languages such as the Chadic languages of west and central Africa, the Cushitic languages of northeast Africa, and the Ethio-Semitic languages, which are found in Ethiopia and Eritrea. Many scholars have accepted an African phylum language origin since five of the six Afro-Asiatic subfamilies, including the Egyptian language, are spoken on the African continent, and only one in Asia.

It has the longest known history of any language having been written from c. 3200 BC to the Middle Ages and remaining as a spoken language for longer. The phases of ancient Egyptian are Old Egyptian, Middle Egyptian (Classical Egyptian), Late Egyptian, Demotic and Coptic. Egyptian writings do not show dialect differences before Coptic, but it was probably spoken in regional dialects around Memphis and later Thebes.

Ancient Egyptian was a synthetic language, but it became more analytic later on. Late Egyptian developed prefixal definite and indefinite articles, which replaced the older inflectional suffixes. There was a change from the older verb–subject–object word order to subject–verb–object. The Egyptian hieroglyphic, hieratic, and demotic scripts were eventually replaced by the more phonetic Coptic alphabet. Coptic is still used in the liturgy of the Egyptian Orthodox Church, and traces of it are found in modern Egyptian Arabic.

=== Sounds and grammar ===
Ancient Egyptian has 25 consonants similar to those of other Afro-Asiatic languages. These include pharyngeal and emphatic consonants, voiced and voiceless stops, voiceless fricatives and voiced and voiceless affricates. It has three long and three short vowels, which expanded in Late Egyptian to about nine. The basic word in Egyptian, similar to Semitic and Berber, is a triliteral or biliteral root of consonants and semiconsonants. Suffixes are added to form words. The verb conjugation corresponds to the person. For example, the triconsonantal skeleton S-Ḏ-M is the semantic core of the word 'hear'; its basic conjugation is sḏm, 'he hears'. If the subject is a noun, suffixes are not added to the verb: sḏm ḥmt, 'the woman hears'.

Adjectives are derived from nouns through a process that Egyptologists call nisbation because of its similarity with Arabic. The word order is predicate–subject in verbal and adjectival sentences, and subject–predicate in nominal and adverbial sentences. The subject can be moved to the beginning of sentences if it is long and is followed by a resumptive pronoun. Verbs and nouns are negated by the particle n, but nn is used for adverbial and adjectival sentences. Stress falls on the ultimate or penultimate syllable, which can be open (CV) or closed (CVC).

=== Writing ===
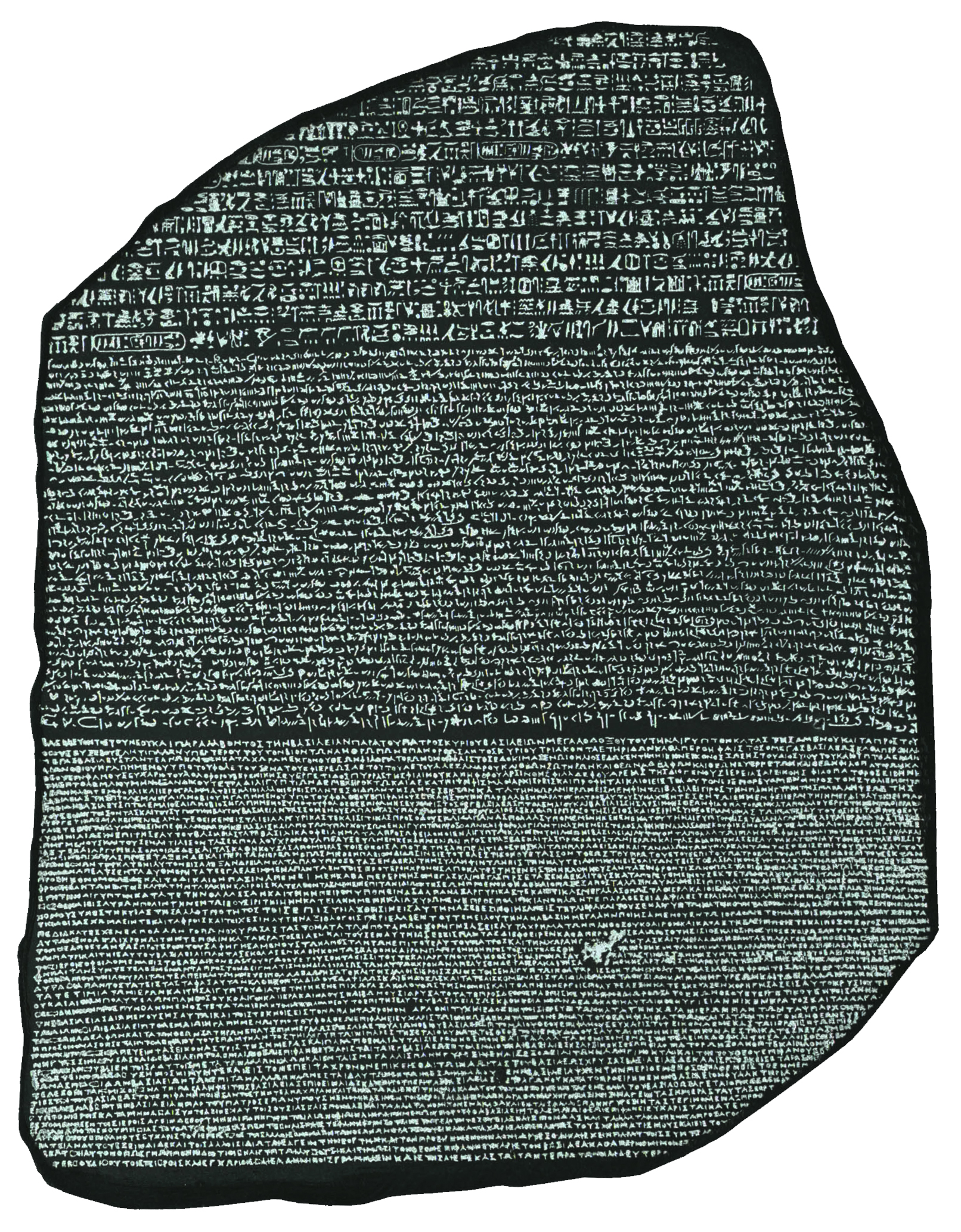
The Rosetta Stone (c. 196 BC) enabled linguists to begin deciphering ancient Egyptian scripts.

Hieroglyphic writing dates from c. 3000 BC, and is composed of hundreds of symbols. A hieroglyph can represent a word, a sound, or a silent determinative; and the same symbol can serve different purposes in different contexts. Hieroglyphs were a formal script, used on stone monuments and in tombs, that could be as detailed as individual works of art. In day-to-day writing, scribes used a cursive form of writing, called hieratic, which was quicker and easier. While formal hieroglyphs may be read in rows or columns in either direction (though typically written from right to left), hieratic was always written from right to left, usually in horizontal rows. A new form of writing, Demotic, became the prevalent writing style, and it is this form of writing—along with formal hieroglyphs—that accompany the Greek text on the Rosetta Stone.

Around the first century AD, the Coptic alphabet started to be used alongside the Demotic script. Coptic is a modified Greek alphabet with the addition of some Demotic signs. Although formal hieroglyphs were used in a ceremonial role until the fourth century, towards the end only a small handful of priests could still read them. As the traditional religious establishments were disbanded, knowledge of hieroglyphic writing was mostly lost. Attempts to decipher them date to the Byzantine and Islamic periods in Egypt, but only in the 1820s, after the discovery of the Rosetta Stone and years of research by Thomas Young and Jean-François Champollion, were hieroglyphs substantially deciphered.

=== Literature ===
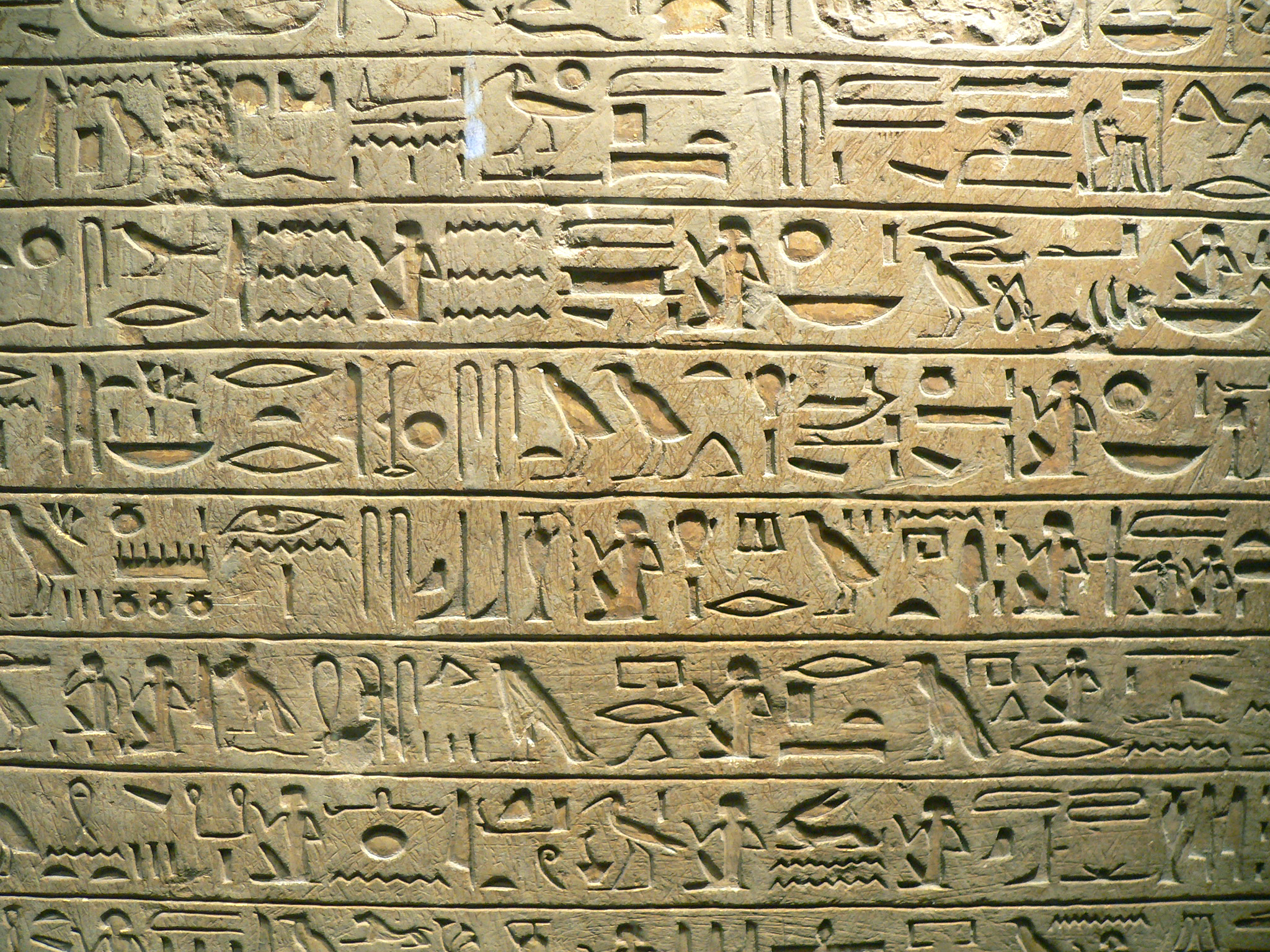
Hieroglyphs on stela in Louvre, c. 1321 BC

Writing first appeared in association with kingship on labels and tags for items found in royal tombs. It was primarily an occupation of the scribes, who worked out of the Per Ankh institution or the House of Life. The latter comprised offices, libraries (called House of Books), laboratories and observatories. Some of the best-known pieces of ancient Egyptian literature, such as the Pyramid and Coffin Texts, were written in Classical Egyptian, which continued to be the language of writing until about 1300 BC. Late Egyptian was spoken from the New Kingdom onward and is represented in Ramesside administrative documents, love poetry and tales, as well as in Demotic and Coptic texts. During this period, the tradition of writing had evolved into the tomb autobiography, such as those of Harkhuf and Weni. The genre known as Sebayt ('instructions') was developed to communicate teachings and guidance from famous nobles; the Ipuwer papyrus, a poem of lamentations describing natural disasters and social upheaval, is a famous example.

The Story of Sinuhe, written in Middle Egyptian, might be the classic of Egyptian literature. Also written at this time was the Westcar Papyrus, a set of stories told to Khufu by his sons relating the marvels performed by priests. The Instruction of Amenemope is considered a masterpiece of Near Eastern literature. Towards the end of the New Kingdom, the vernacular language was more often employed to write popular pieces such as the Story of Wenamun and the Instruction of Any. The former tells the story of a noble who is robbed on his way to buy cedar from Lebanon and of his struggle to return to Egypt. From about 700 BC, narrative stories and instructions, such as the popular Instructions of Onchsheshonqy, as well as personal and business documents were written in the demotic script and phase of Egyptian. Many stories written in demotic during the Greco-Roman period were set in previous historical eras, when Egypt was an independent nation ruled by great pharaohs such as Ramesses II.

== Culture ==
=== Daily life ===
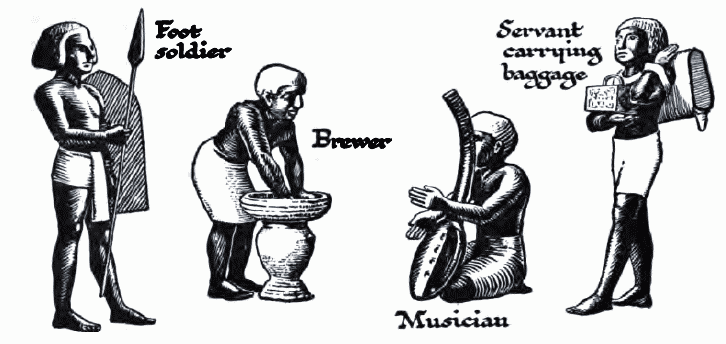
Lower-class occupations

Most ancient Egyptians were farmers tied to the land. Their dwellings were restricted to immediate family members, and were constructed of mudbrick designed to remain cool in the heat of the day. Each home had a kitchen with an open roof, which contained a grindstone for milling grain and a small oven for baking the bread. Ceramics served as household wares for the storage, preparation, transport, and consumption of food, drink, and raw materials. Walls were painted white and could be covered with dyed linen wall hangings. Floors were covered with reed mats, while wooden stools, beds raised from the floor and individual tables comprised the furniture.

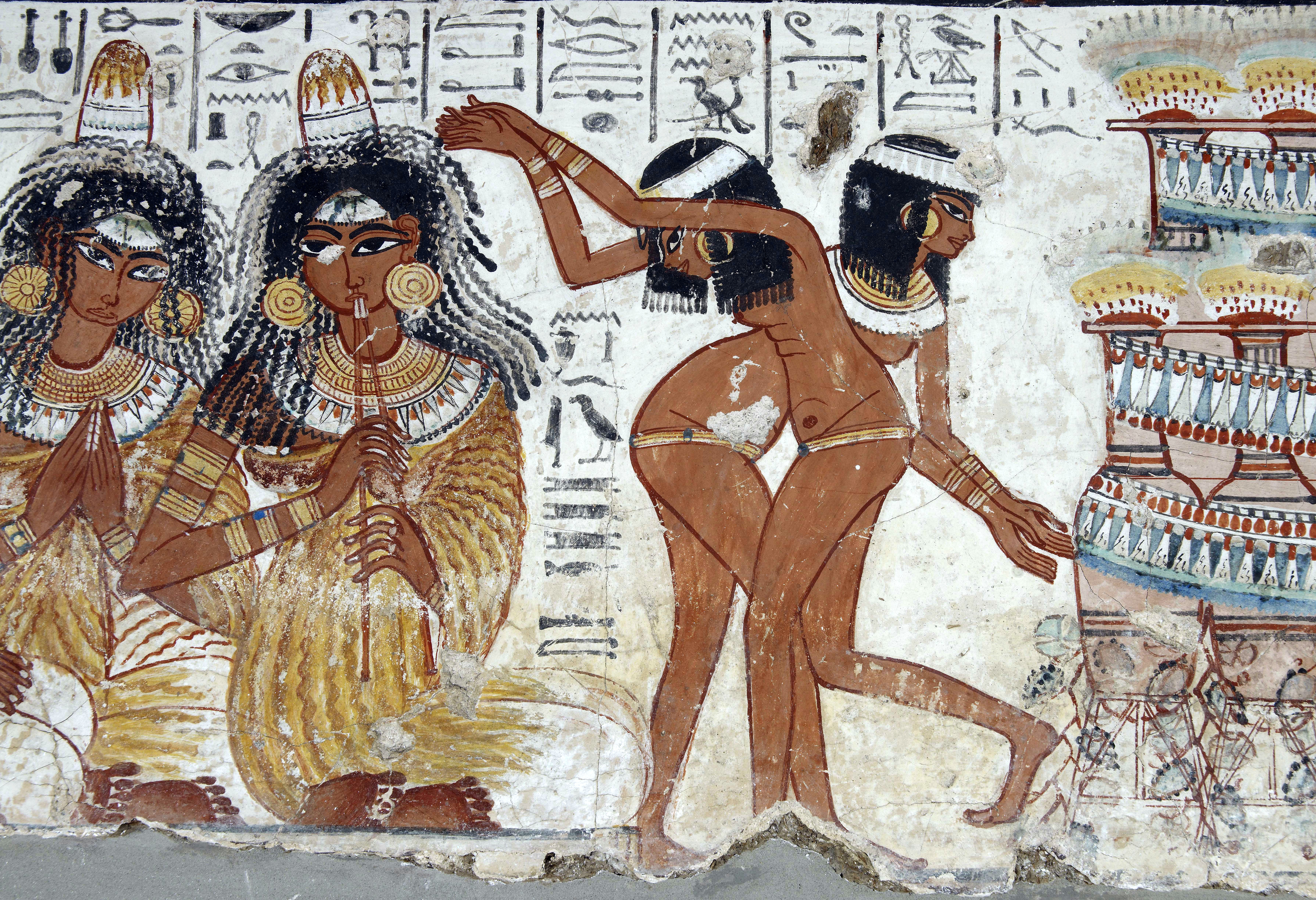
Egyptians celebrated feasts and festivals, accompanied by music and dance.

The ancient Egyptians placed a great value on hygiene and appearance. Most bathed in the Nile and used a pasty soap made from animal fat and chalk. Men shaved their entire bodies for cleanliness; perfumes and aromatic ointments covered bad odors and soothed skin. Clothing was made from simple linen sheets that were bleached white, and both men and women of the upper classes wore wigs, jewelry, and cosmetics. Children went without clothing until maturity, at about age 12, and at this age males were circumcised and had their heads shaved. Mothers were responsible for taking care of the children, while the father provided the family's income.

Music and dance were popular entertainments for those who could afford them. Early instruments included flutes and harps, while instruments similar to trumpets, oboes, and pipes developed later and became popular. In the New Kingdom, the Egyptians played on bells, cymbals, tambourines, drums, and imported lutes and lyres from Asia. The sistrum was a rattle-like musical instrument that was especially important in religious ceremonies.

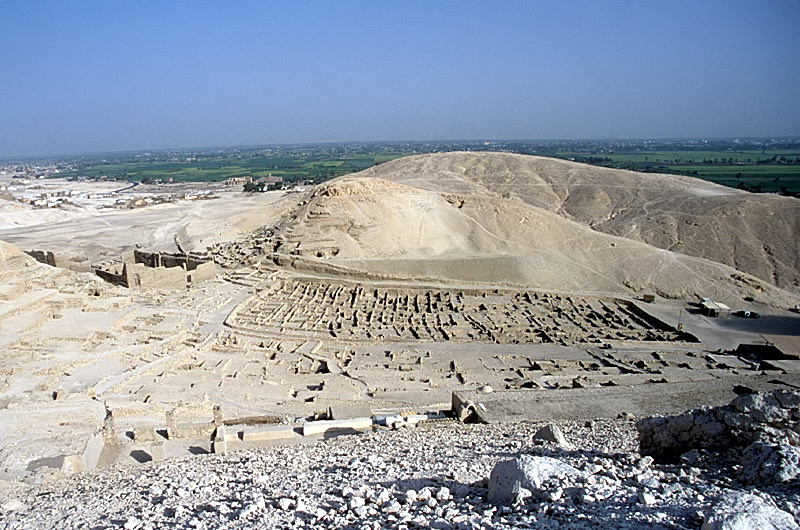
Ruins of Deir el-Medina

The ancient Egyptians enjoyed a variety of leisure activities, including games and music. Senet, a board game where pieces moved according to random chance, was particularly popular from the earliest times; another similar game was mehen, which had a circular gaming board. "Hounds and Jackals," also known as 58 holes, is another example of board games played in ancient Egypt. The first complete set of this game was discovered from a Theban tomb of the Egyptian pharaoh Amenemhat IV that dates to the 13th Dynasty. Juggling and ball games were popular with children, and wrestling is also documented in a tomb at Beni Hasan. The wealthy members of ancient Egyptian society enjoyed hunting, fishing, and boating as well.

The excavation of the workers' village of Deir el-Medina has resulted in one of the most thoroughly documented accounts of community life in the ancient world, which spans almost four hundred years. There is no comparable site in which the organization, social interactions, and working and living conditions of a community have been studied in such detail.

=== Cuisine ===
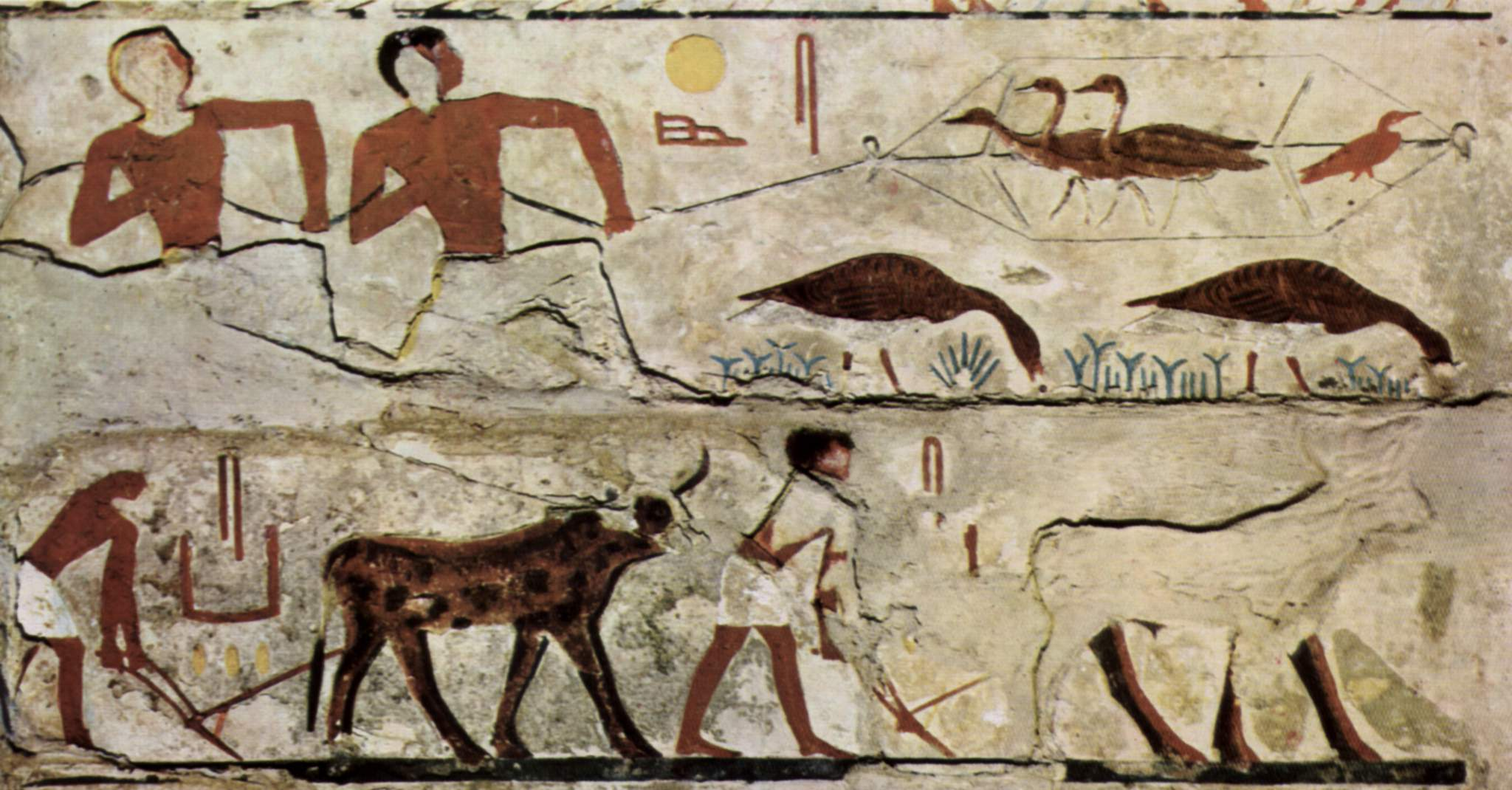
Hunting game birds and plowing a field, tomb of Nefermaat and his wife Itet (c. 2700 BC)

Egyptian cuisine remained remarkably stable over time; indeed, the cuisine of modern Egypt retains some striking similarities to the cuisine of the ancients. The staple diet consisted of bread and beer, supplemented with vegetables such as onions and garlic, and fruit such as dates and figs. Wine and meat were enjoyed by all on feast days while the upper classes indulged on a more regular basis. Fish, meat, and fowl could be salted or dried, and could be cooked in stews or roasted on a grill.

=== Architecture ===
The architecture of ancient Egypt includes some of the most famous structures in the world: the Great Pyramids of Giza and the temples at Thebes. Building projects were organized and funded by the state for religious and commemorative purposes, but also to reinforce the wide-ranging power of the pharaoh. The ancient Egyptians were skilled builders; using only simple but effective tools and sighting instruments, architects could build large stone structures with great accuracy and precision that is still envied today.

The domestic dwellings of elite and ordinary Egyptians alike were constructed from perishable materials such as mudbricks and wood, and have not survived. Peasants lived in simple homes, while the palaces of the elite and the pharaoh were more elaborate structures. A few surviving New Kingdom palaces, such as those in Malkata and Amarna, show richly decorated walls and floors with scenes of people, birds, water pools, deities and geometric designs. Important structures such as temples and tombs that were intended to last forever were constructed of stone instead of mudbricks. The architectural elements used in the world's first large-scale stone building, Djoser's mortuary complex, include post and lintel supports in the papyrus and lotus motif.

The earliest preserved ancient Egyptian temples, such as those at Giza, consist of single, enclosed halls with roof slabs supported by columns. In the New Kingdom, architects added the pylon, the open courtyard, and the enclosed hypostyle hall to the front of the temple's sanctuary, a style that was standard until the Greco-Roman period. The earliest and most popular tomb architecture in the Old Kingdom was the mastaba, a flat-roofed rectangular structure of mudbrick or stone built over an underground burial chamber. The step pyramid of Djoser is a series of stone mastabas stacked on top of each other. Pyramids were built during the Old and Middle Kingdoms, but most later rulers abandoned them in favor of less conspicuous rock-cut tombs. The use of the pyramid form continued in private tomb chapels of the New Kingdom and in the royal pyramids of Nubia.

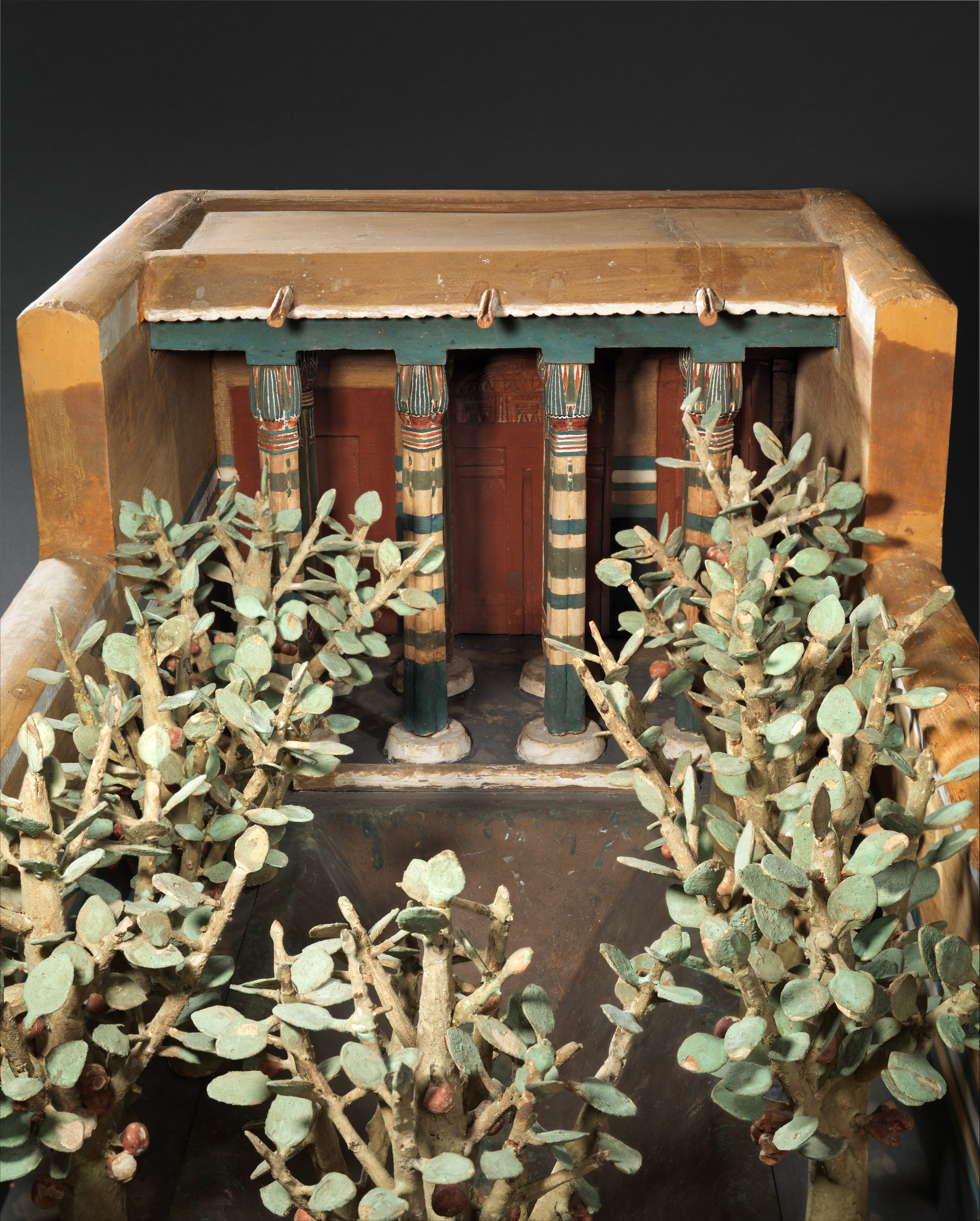
Model of a household porch and garden, c. 1981–1975 BC

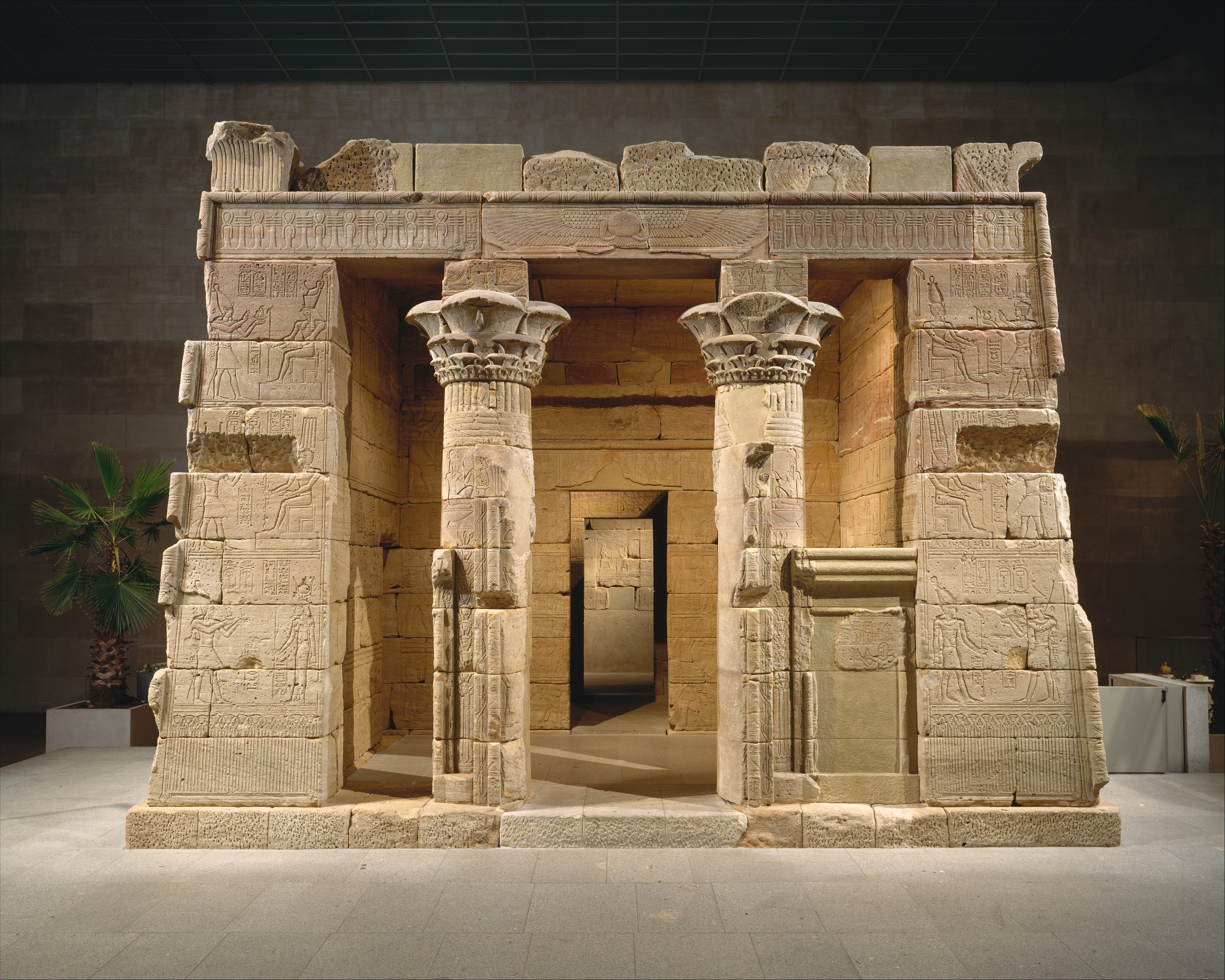
The Temple of Dendur, completed by 10 BC, Metropolitan Museum of Art (New York City)

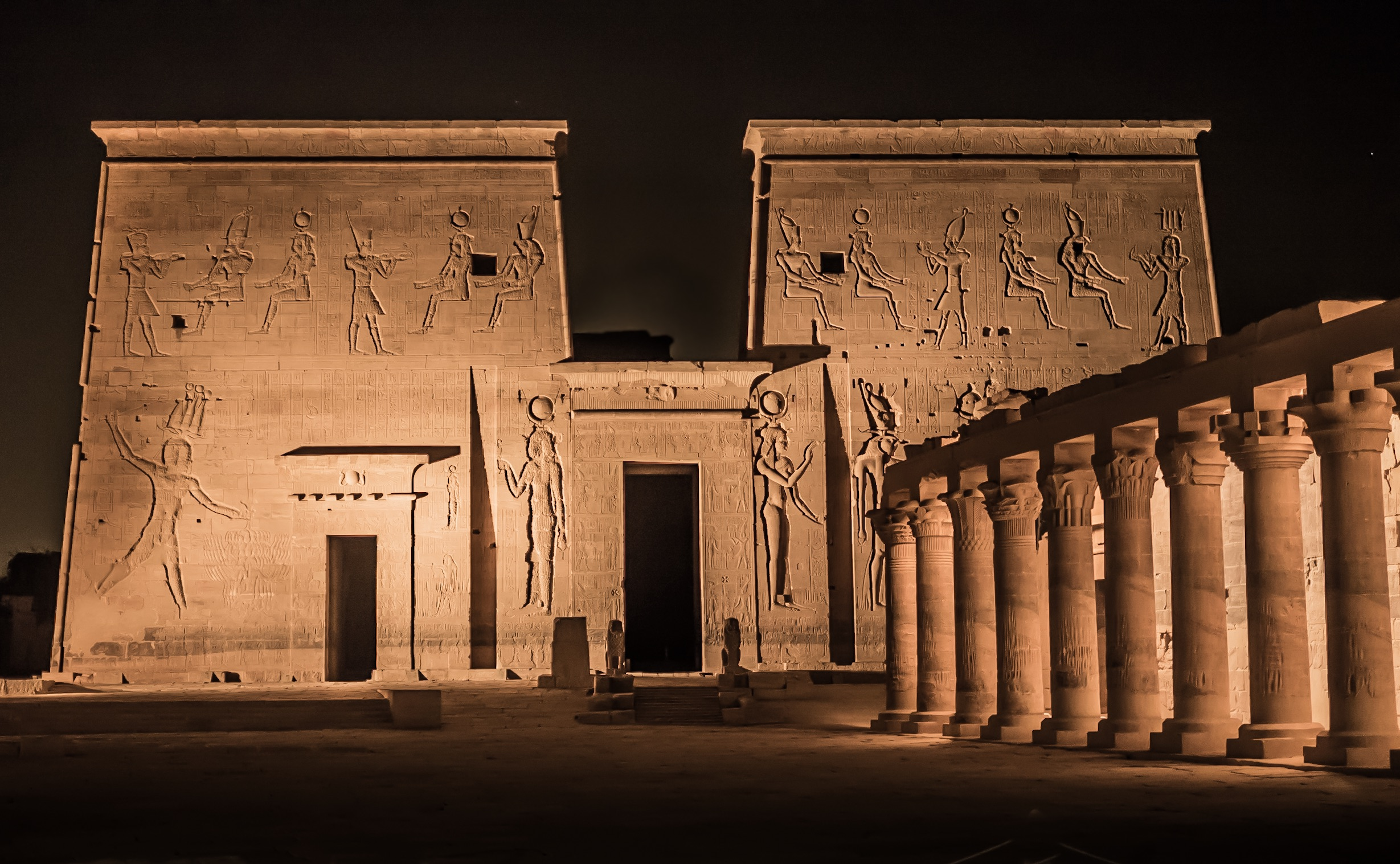
The well preserved Temple of Isis from Philae is an example of Egyptian architecture and architectural sculpture.

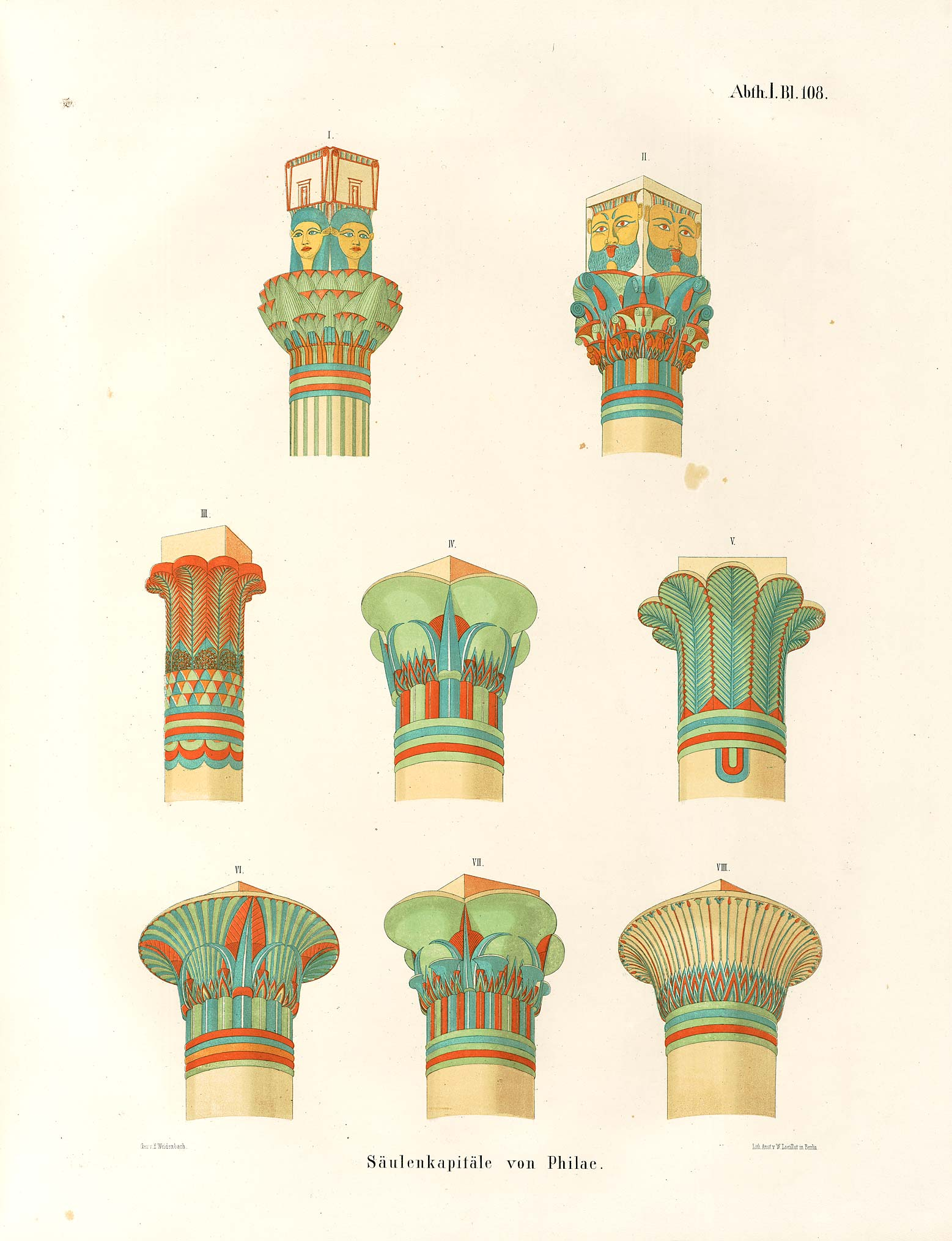
Illustration of various types of capitals, by Karl Richard Lepsius

=== Art ===
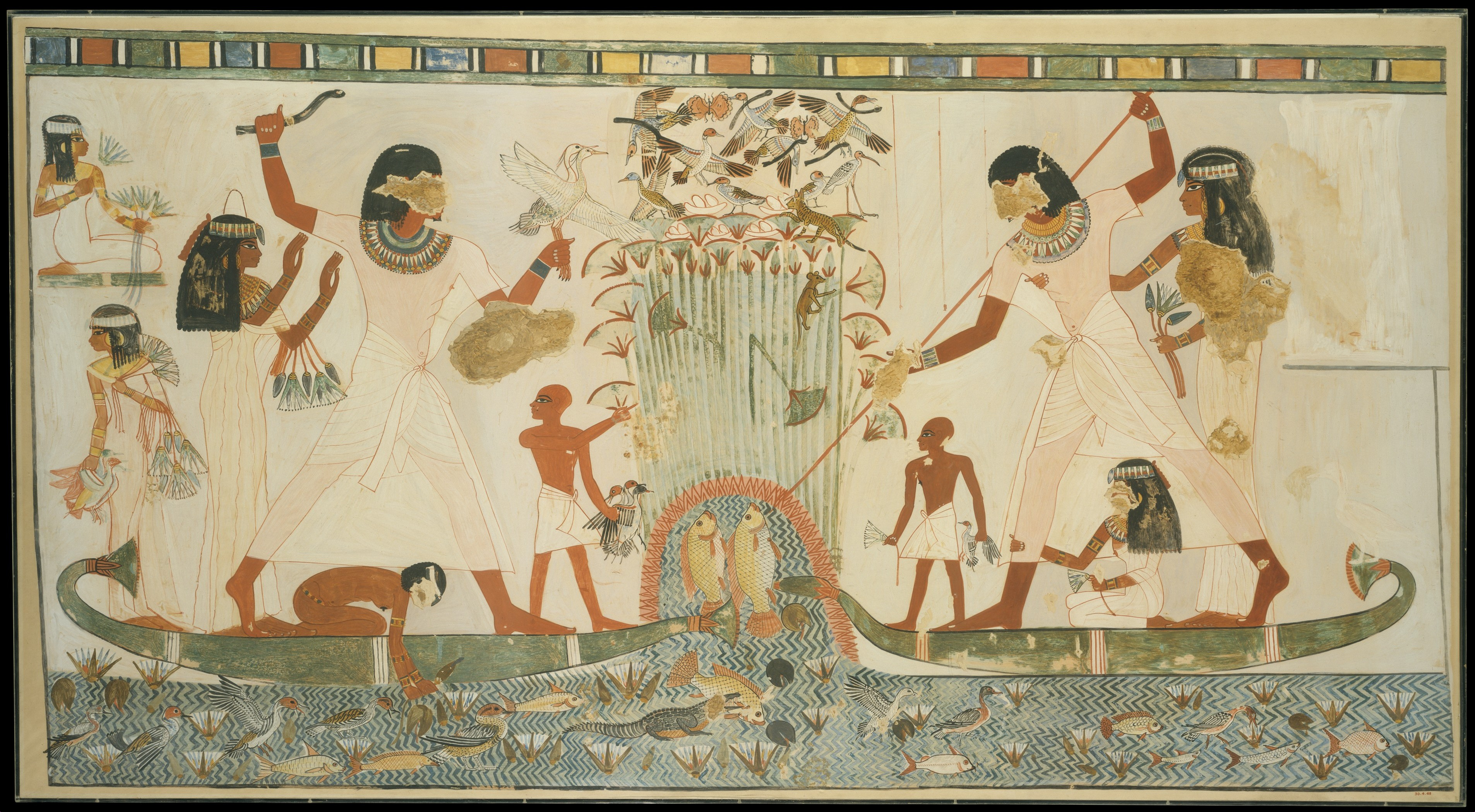
Menna and Family Hunting in the Marshes, Tomb of Menna, c. 1400 BC

The ancient Egyptians produced art to serve functional purposes. For over 3500 years, artists adhered to artistic forms and iconography that were developed during the Old Kingdom, following a strict set of principles that resisted foreign influence and internal change. These artistic standards—simple lines, shapes, and flat areas of color combined with the characteristic flat projection of figures with no indication of spatial depth—created a sense of order and balance within a composition. Images and text were intimately interwoven on tomb and temple walls, coffins, stelae, and even statues. The Narmer Palette, for example, displays figures that can also be read as hieroglyphs. Because of the rigid rules that governed its highly stylized and symbolic appearance, ancient Egyptian art served its political and religious purposes with precision and clarity.

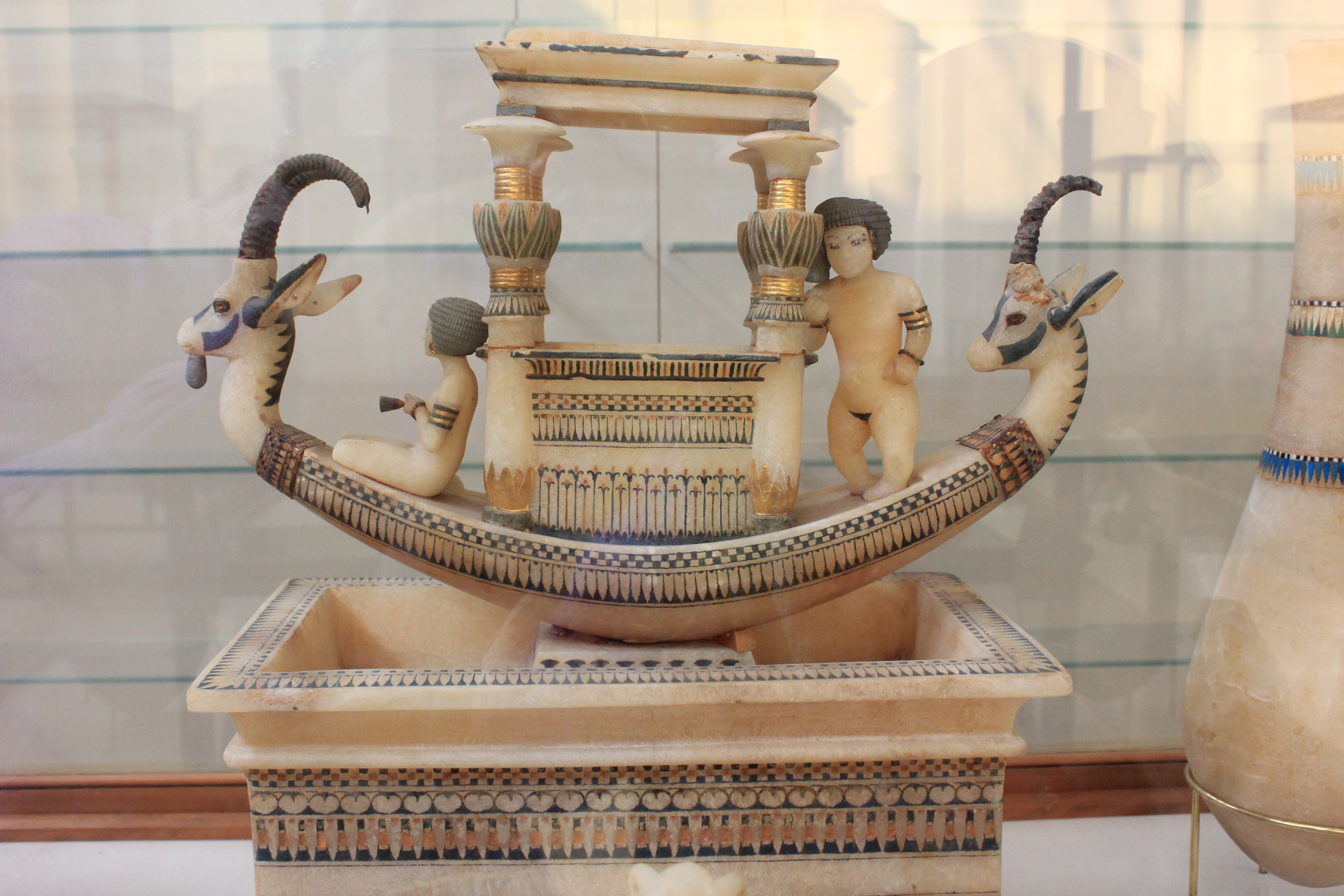
Egyptian tomb models as funerary goods

Ancient Egyptian artisans used stone as a medium for carving statues and fine reliefs, but used wood as a cheap and easily carved substitute. Paints were obtained from minerals such as iron ores (red and yellow ochres), copper ores (blue and green), soot or charcoal (black), and limestone (white). Paints could be mixed with gum arabic as a binder and pressed into cakes, which could be moistened with water when needed.

Pharaohs used reliefs to record victories in battle, royal decrees, and religious scenes. Common citizens had access to pieces of funerary art, such as ushabti statues and books of the dead, which they believed would protect them in the afterlife. During the Middle Kingdom, wooden or clay models depicting scenes from everyday life became popular additions to the tomb. In an attempt to duplicate the activities of the living in the afterlife, these models show laborers, houses, boats, and even military formations that are scale representations of the ideal ancient Egyptian afterlife.

Despite the homogeneity of ancient Egyptian art, the styles of particular times and places sometimes reflected changing cultural or political attitudes. After the invasion of the Hyksos in the Second Intermediate Period, Minoan-style frescoes were found in Avaris. The most striking example of a politically driven change in artistic forms comes from the Amarna Period, where figures were radically altered to conform to Akhenaten's revolutionary religious ideas. This style, known as Amarna art, was quickly abandoned after Akhenaten's death and replaced by the traditional forms.

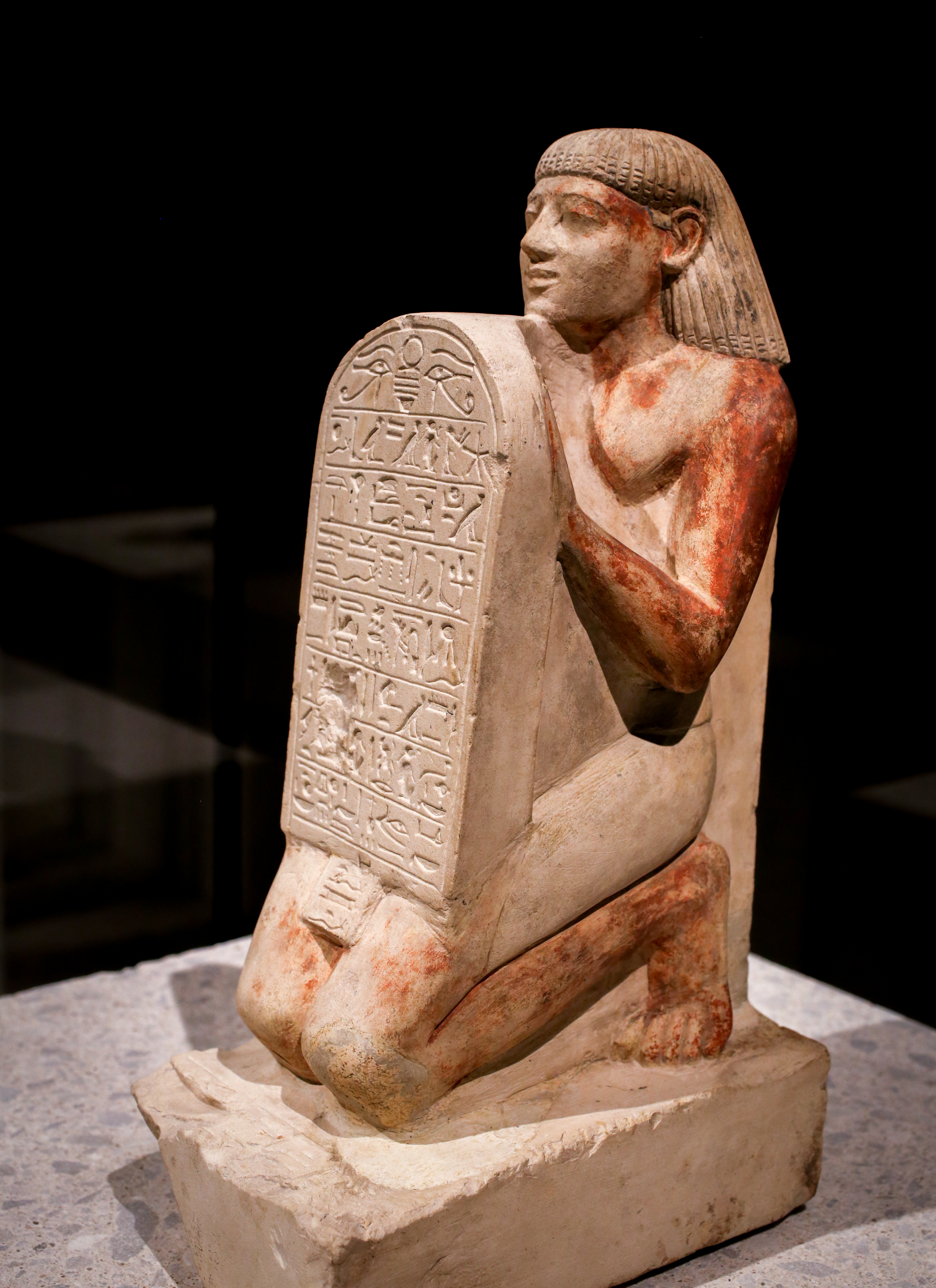
Stelophorous statue of Amenemhat; c. 1500 BC

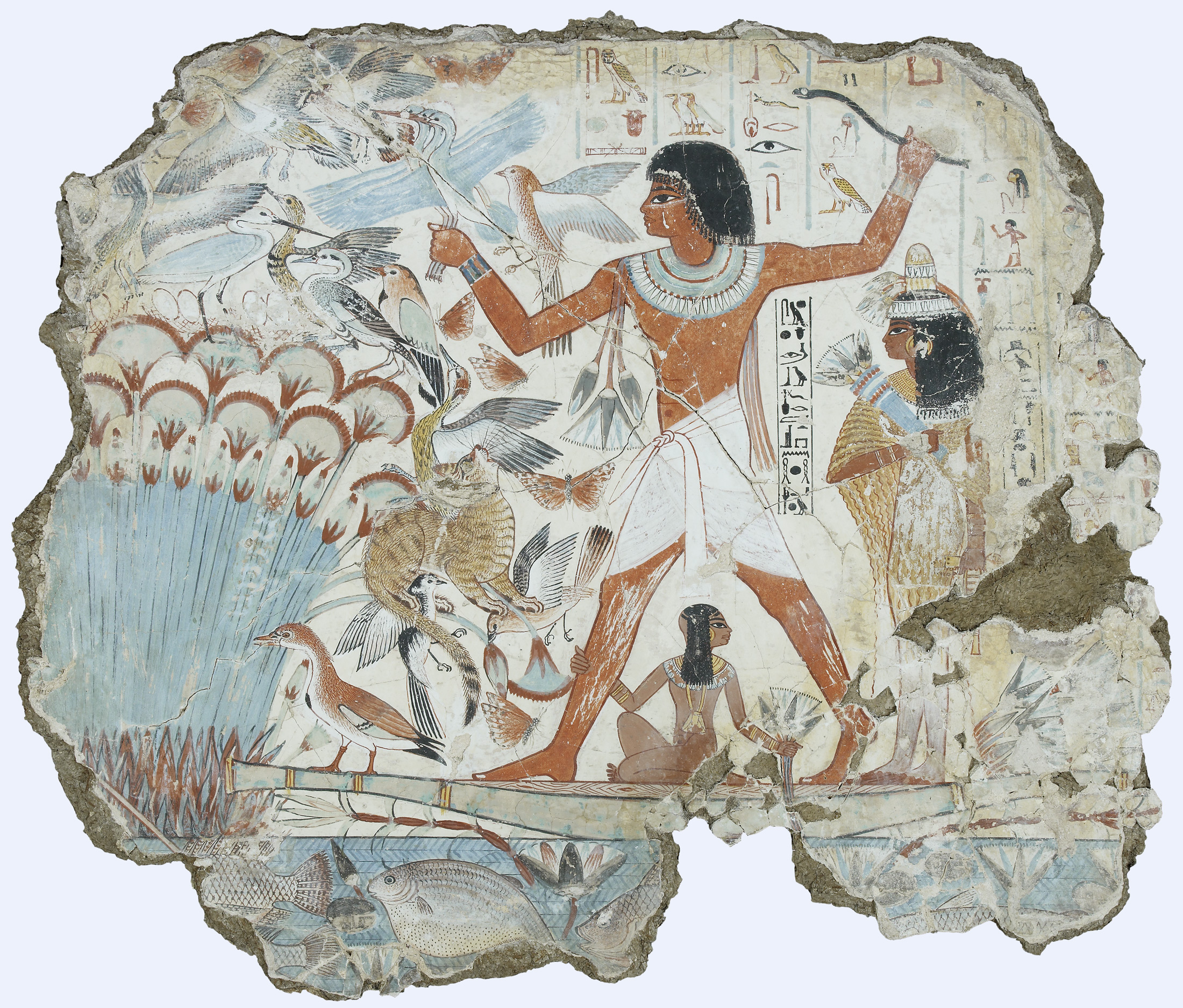
Fresco which depicts Nebamun hunting birds; c. 1350 BC

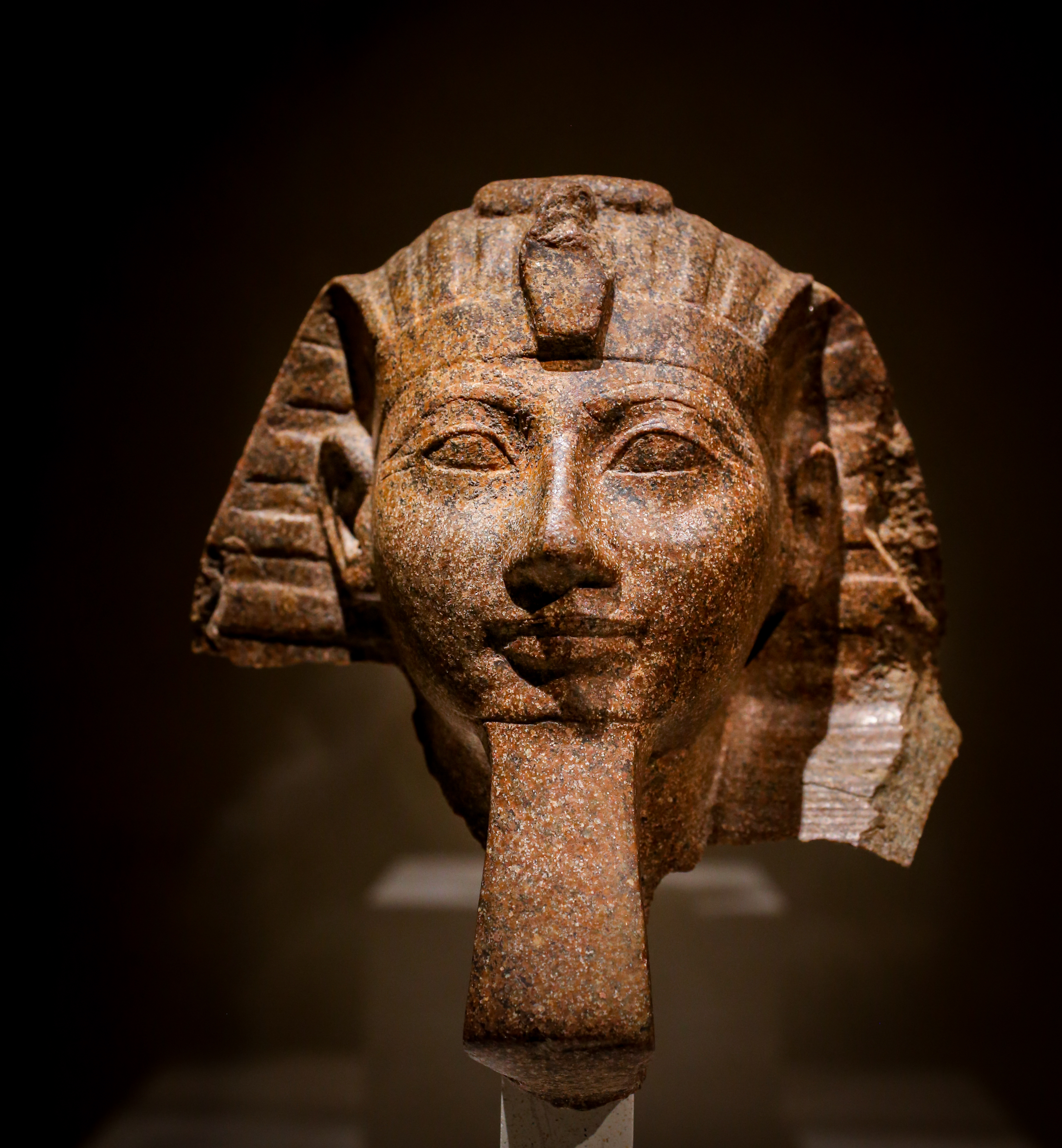
Portrait head of pharaoh Hatshepsut or Thutmose III; 1480–1425 BC

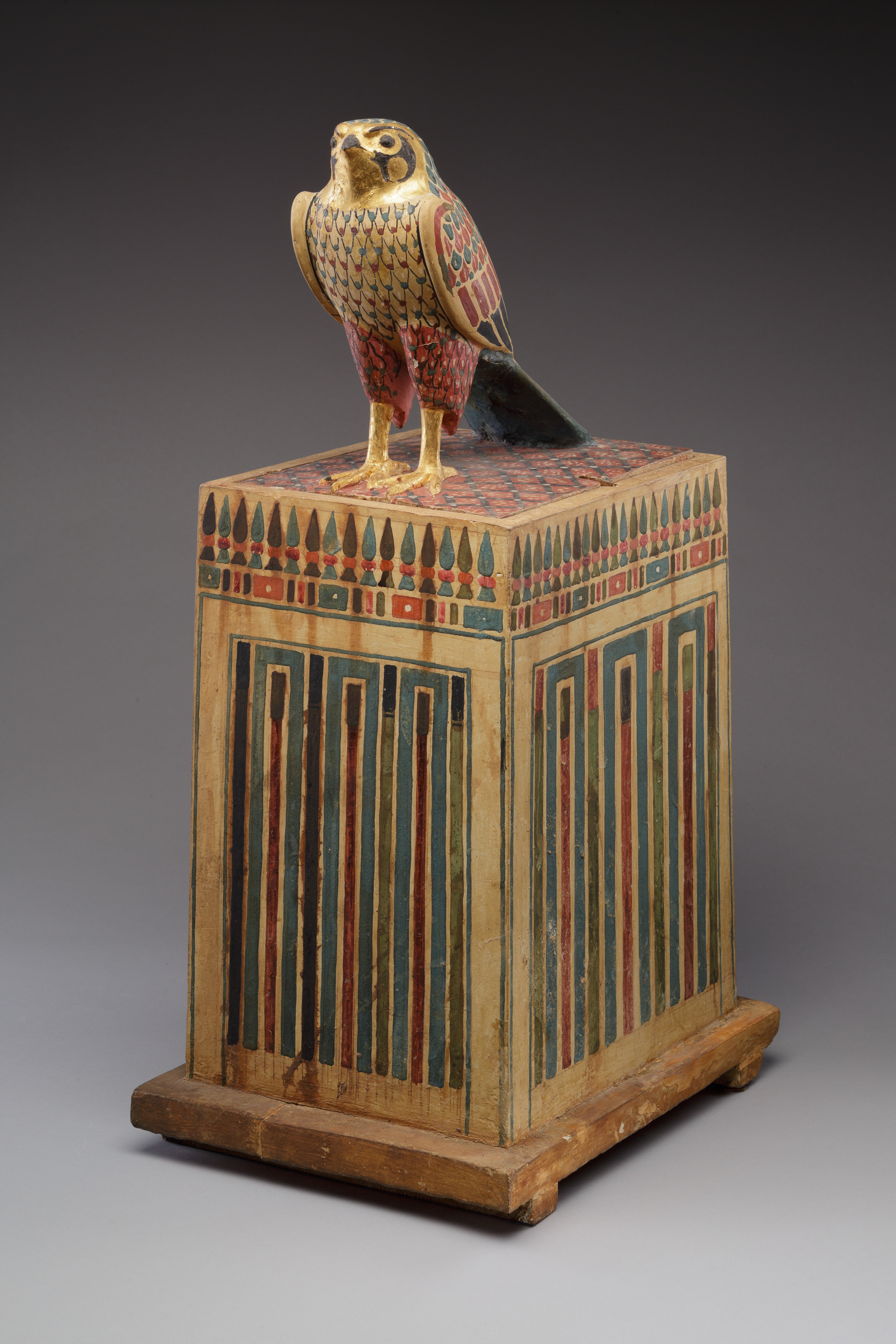
Falcon box with wrapped contents; 332–30 BC

=== Religious beliefs ===
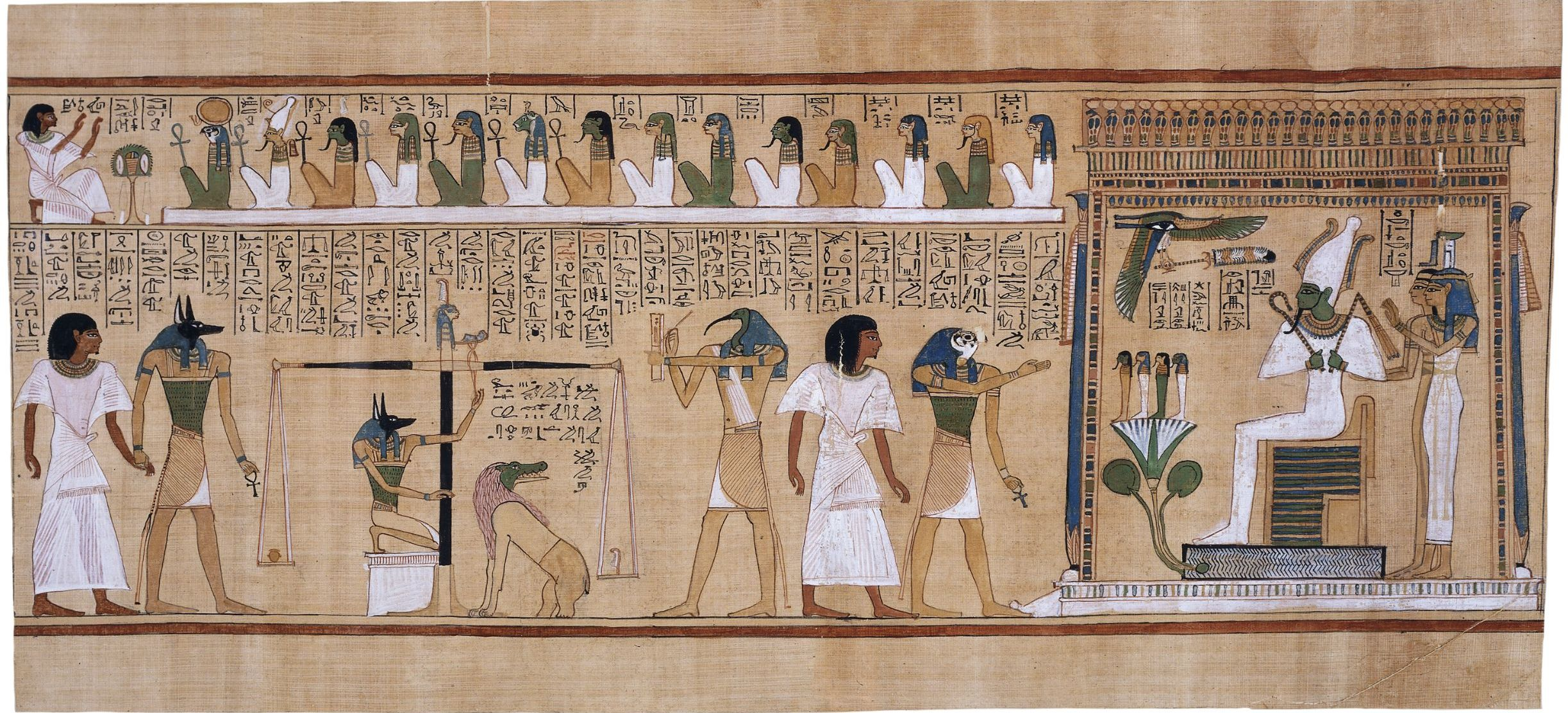
The Book of the Dead was a guide to the deceased's journey in the afterlife.

Beliefs in the divine and in the afterlife were ingrained in ancient Egyptian civilization from its inception; pharaonic rule was based on the divine right of kings. The Egyptian pantheon was populated by gods who had supernatural powers and were called on for help or protection. However, the gods were not always viewed as benevolent, and Egyptians believed they had to be appeased with offerings and prayers. The structure of this pantheon changed continually as new deities were promoted in the hierarchy, but priests made no effort to organize the diverse and sometimes conflicting myths and stories into a coherent system. These various conceptions of divinity were not considered contradictory but rather layers in the multiple facets of reality.

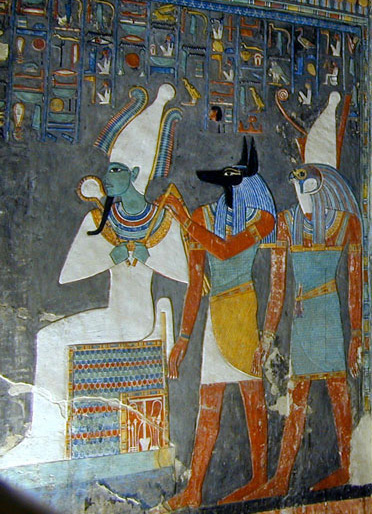
The gods Osiris, Anubis, and Horus in the tomb of Horemheb (KV57) in the Valley of the Kings

Gods were worshiped in cult temples administered by priests acting on the king's behalf. At the center of the temple was the cult statue in a shrine. Temples were not places of public worship or congregation, and only on select feast days and celebrations was a shrine carrying the statue of the god brought out for public worship. Normally, the god's domain was sealed off from the outside world and was only accessible to temple officials. Common citizens could worship private statues in their homes, and amulets offered protection against the forces of chaos. After the New Kingdom, the pharaoh's role as a spiritual intermediary was de-emphasized as religious customs shifted to direct worship of the gods. As a result, priests developed a system of oracles to communicate the will of the gods directly to the people.

The Egyptians believed that every human being was composed of physical and spiritual parts or aspects. In addition to the body, each person had a šwt (shadow), a ba (personality or soul), a ka (life-force), and a name. The heart, rather than the brain, was considered the seat of thoughts and emotions. After death, the spiritual aspects were released from the body and could move at will, but they required the physical remains (or a substitute, such as a statue) as a permanent home. The ultimate goal of the deceased was to rejoin his ka and ba and become one of the "blessed dead", living on as an akh, or "effective one". For this to happen, the deceased had to be judged worthy in a trial, in which the heart was weighed against a "feather of truth". If deemed worthy, the deceased could continue their existence on earth in spiritual form. If they were not deemed worthy, their heart was eaten by Ammit the Devourer and they were erased from the Universe.

=== Burial customs ===
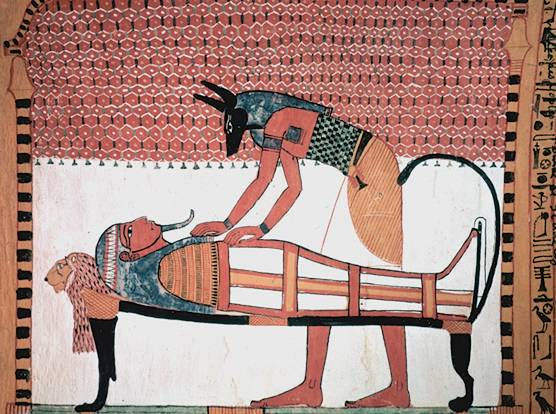
Anubis, the god associated with mummification and burial rituals, attending to a mummy

The ancient Egyptians maintained an elaborate set of burial customs that they believed were necessary to ensure immortality after death. These customs involved preserving the body by mummification, performing burial ceremonies, and interring with the body goods the deceased would use in the afterlife. Before the Old Kingdom, bodies buried in desert pits were naturally preserved by desiccation. The arid, desert conditions were a boon throughout the history of ancient Egypt for burials of the poor, who could not afford the elaborate burial preparations available to the elite. Wealthier Egyptians began to bury their dead in stone tombs and use artificial mummification, which involved removing the internal organs, wrapping the body in linen, and burying it in a rectangular stone sarcophagus or wooden coffin. Beginning in the Fourth Dynasty, some parts were preserved separately in canopic jars.

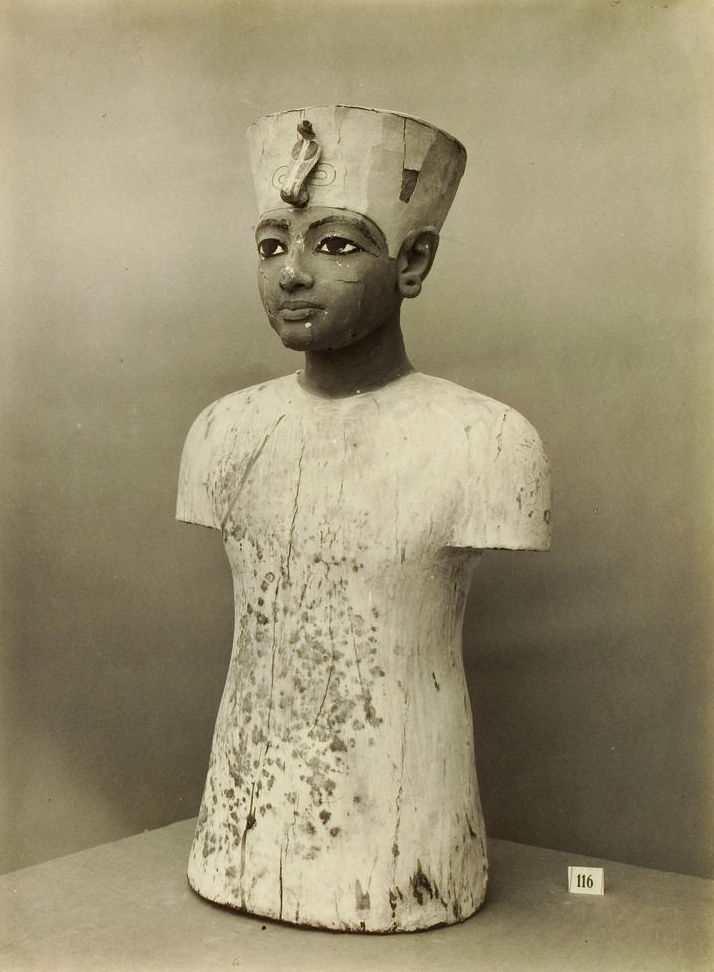
A painted, wooden figure found in Tutankhamun's royal tomb

By the New Kingdom, the ancient Egyptians had perfected the art of mummification; the best technique took 70 days and involved removing the internal organs, removing the brain through the nose, and desiccating the body in a mixture of salts called natron. The body was then wrapped in linen with protective amulets inserted between layers and placed in a decorated anthropoid coffin. Mummies of the Late Period were also placed in painted cartonnage mummy cases. Actual preservation practices declined during the Ptolemaic and Roman eras, while greater emphasis was placed on the outer appearance of the mummy, which was decorated.

Wealthy Egyptians were buried with larger quantities of luxury items, but all burials, regardless of social status, included goods for the deceased. Funerary texts were often included in the grave, and, beginning in the New Kingdom, so were ushabti statues that were believed to perform manual labor for them in the afterlife. Rituals in which the deceased was magically re-animated accompanied burials. After burial, living relatives were expected to occasionally bring food to the tomb and recite prayers on behalf of the deceased.

== Military ==
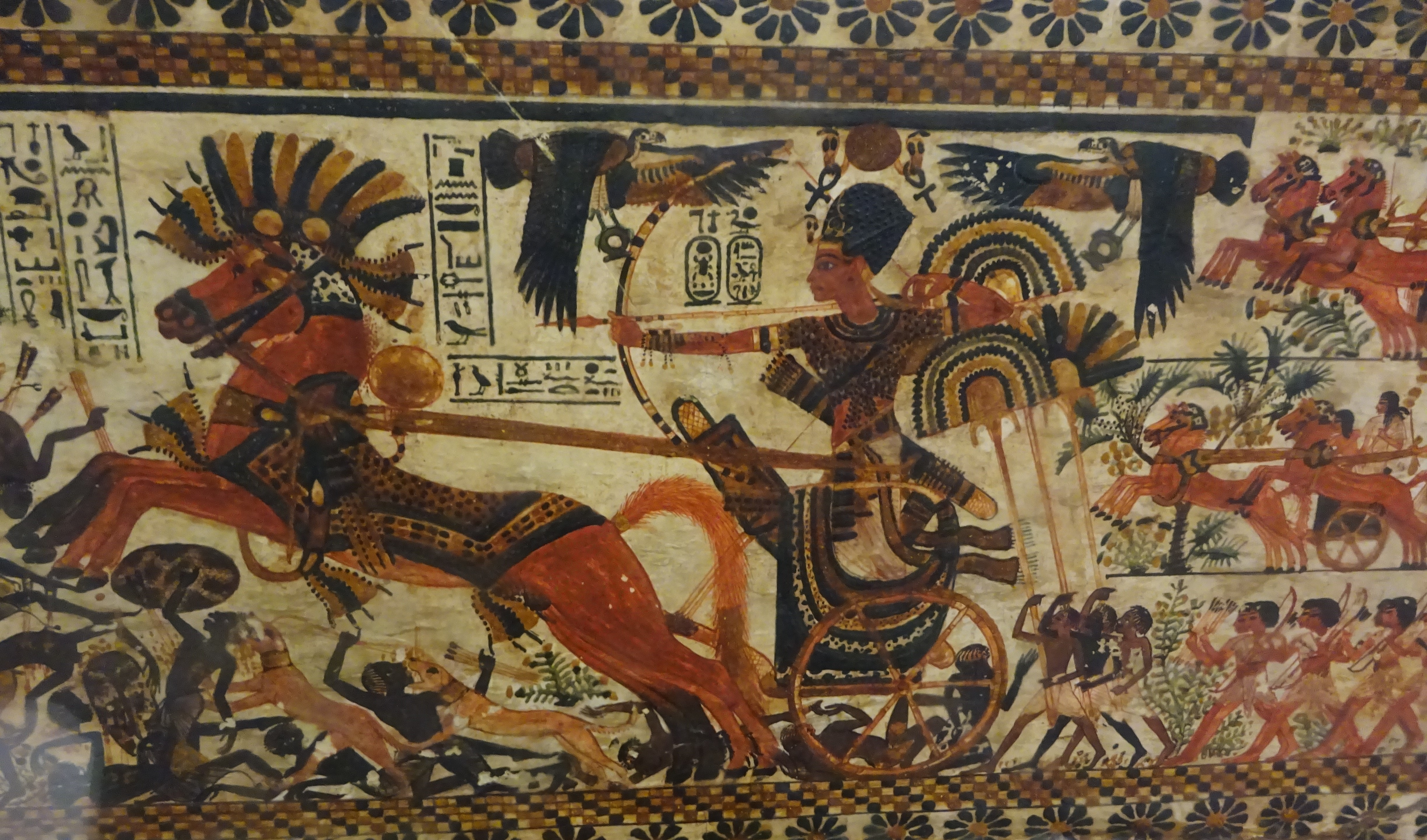
Tutankhamun charging enemies on his chariot, 18th dynasty

The ancient Egyptian military was responsible for defending Egypt against foreign invasion, and for maintaining Egypt's domination in the ancient Near East. The military protected mining expeditions to the Sinai during the Old Kingdom and fought civil wars during the First and Second Intermediate Periods. The military was responsible for maintaining fortifications along important trade routes, such as those found at the city of Buhen on the way to Nubia. Forts also were constructed to serve as military bases, such as the fortress at Sile, which was a base of operations for expeditions to the Levant. In the New Kingdom, a series of pharaohs used the standing Egyptian army to attack and conquer Kush and parts of the Levant.

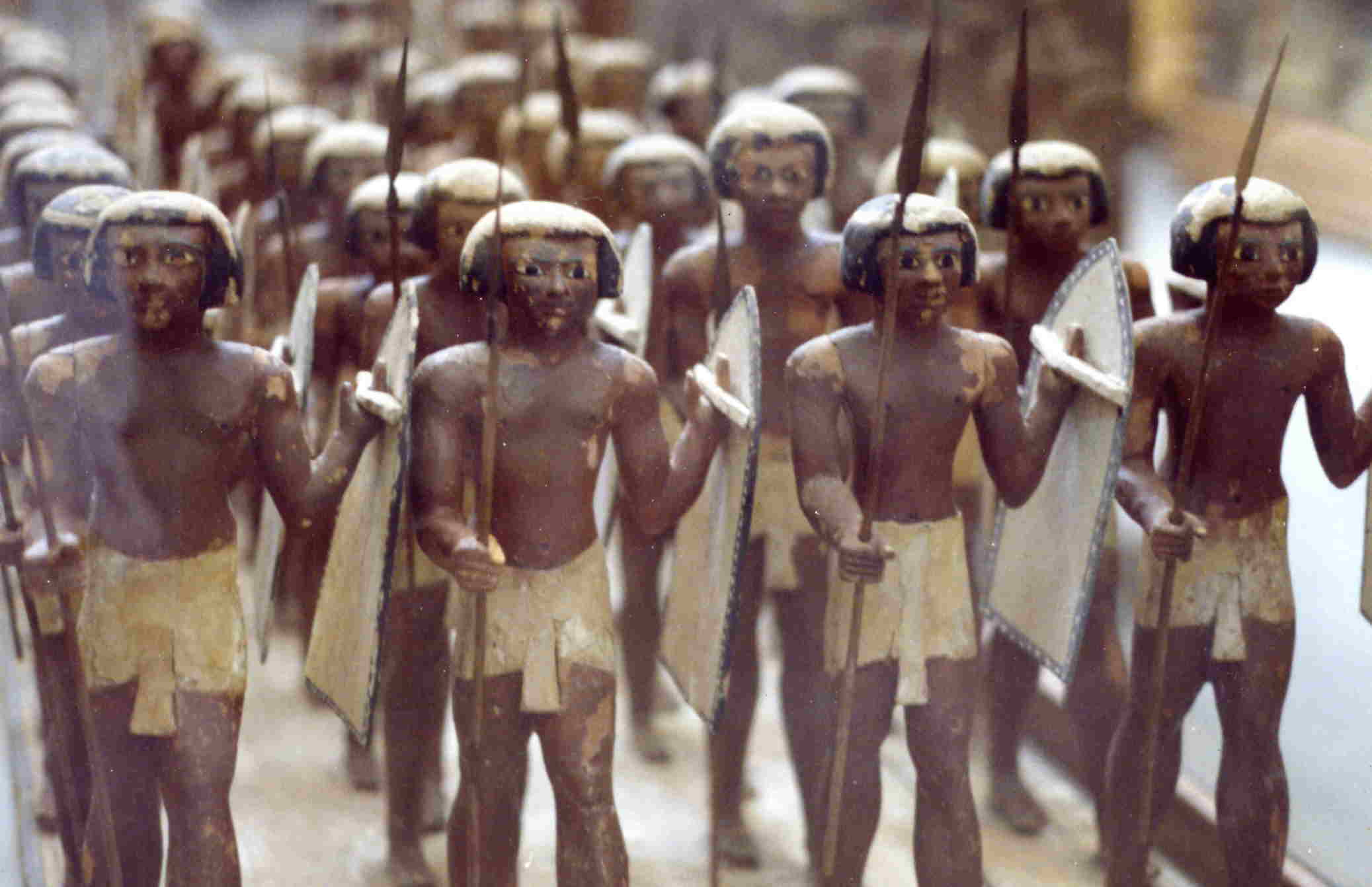
11th Dynasty model of Egyptian soldiers from the tomb of Mesehti, Upper Egypt

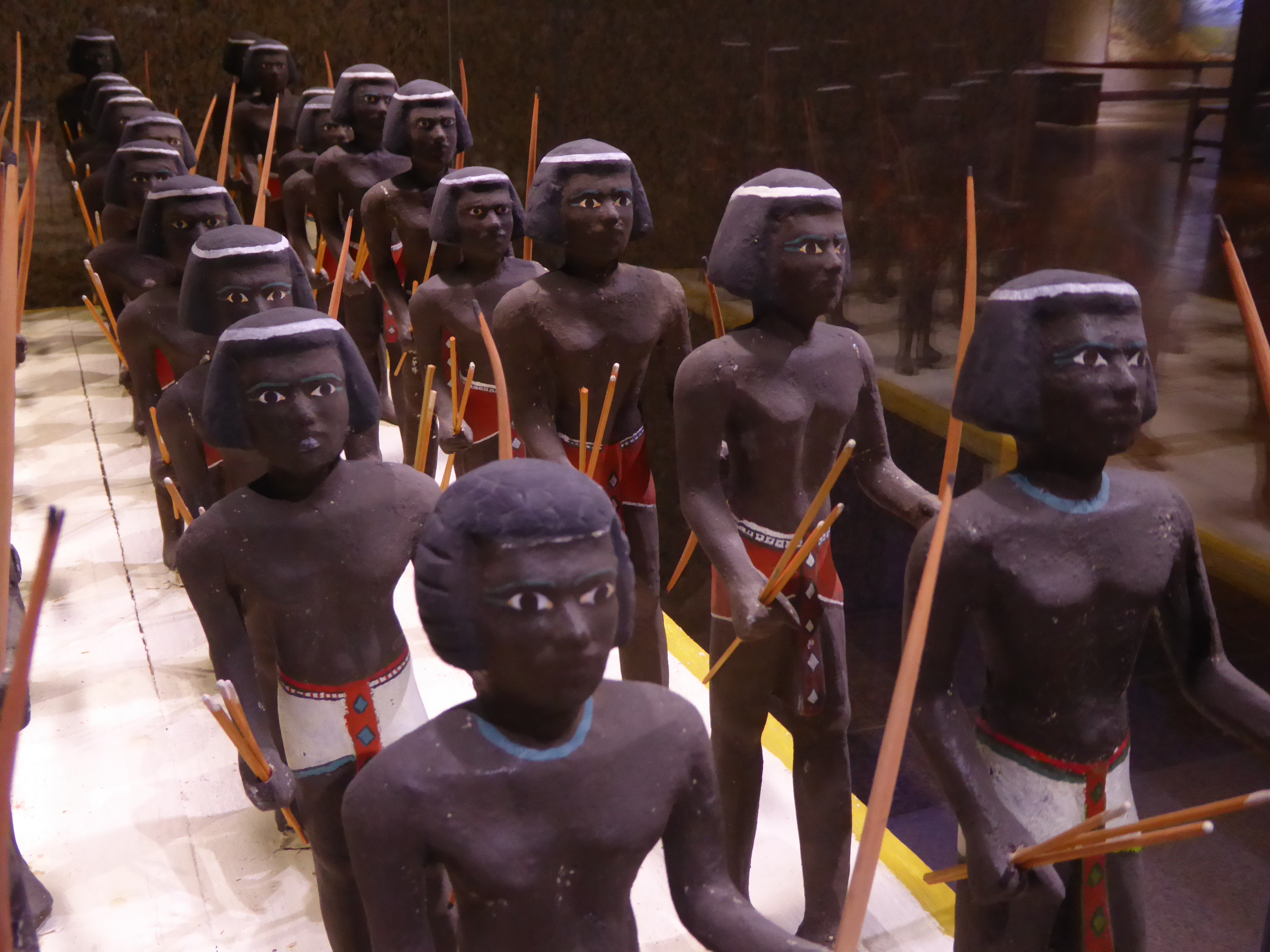
11th Dynasty model of Nubian archers from a tomb in Asyut, Upper Egypt

Typical military equipment included bows and arrows, spears, and round-topped shields made by stretching animal skin over a wooden frame. In the New Kingdom, the military began using chariots that had earlier been introduced by the Hyksos invaders. Weapons and armor continued to improve after the adoption of bronze: shields were now made from solid wood with a bronze buckle, spears were tipped with a bronze point, and the khopesh was adopted from Asiatic soldiers. The pharaoh was usually depicted in art and literature riding at the head of the army; it has been suggested that at least a few pharaohs, such as Seqenenre Tao II and his sons, did do so. However, it has also been argued that "kings of this period did not personally act as frontline war leaders, fighting alongside their troops". Soldiers were recruited from the general population, but during, and especially after, the New Kingdom, mercenaries from Nubia, Kush, and Libya were hired to fight for Egypt.

== Technology, medicine and mathematics ==
=== Technology ===
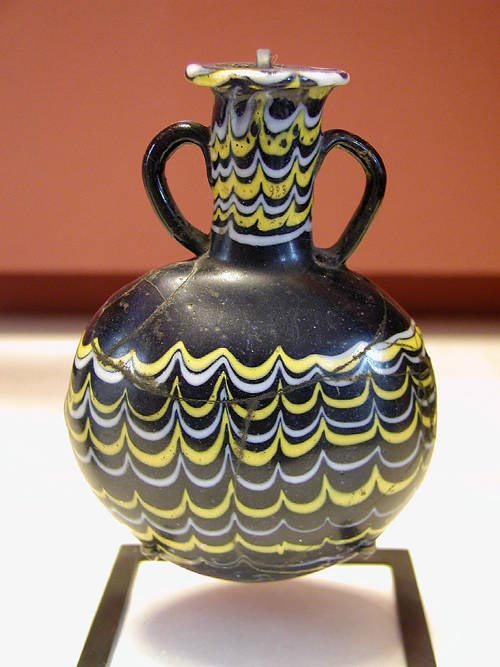
Glassmaking was a highly developed art.

In technology, medicine, and mathematics, ancient Egypt achieved a relatively high standard of productivity and sophistication. Traditional empiricism, as evidenced by the Edwin Smith and Ebers papyri (c. 1600 BC), is first credited to Egypt. The Egyptians created their own alphabet and decimal system.

=== Faience and glass ===
Even before the Old Kingdom, the ancient Egyptians had developed a glassy material known as faience, which they treated as a type of artificial semi-precious stone. Faience is a non-clay ceramic made of silica, small amounts of lime and soda, and a colorant, typically copper. The material was used to make beads, tiles, figurines, and small wares. Several methods can be used to create faience, but typically production involved application of the powdered materials in the form of a paste over a clay core, which was then fired. By a related technique, the ancient Egyptians produced a pigment known as Egyptian blue, also called blue frit, which is produced by fusing (or sintering) silica, copper, lime, and an alkali such as natron. The product can be ground up and used as a pigment.

The ancient Egyptians could fabricate a wide variety of objects from glass with great skill, but it is not clear whether they developed the process independently. It is also unclear whether they made their own raw glass or merely imported pre-made ingots, which they melted and finished. However, they did have technical expertise in making objects, as well as adding trace elements to control the color of the finished glass. A range of colors could be produced, including yellow, red, green, blue, purple, and white, and the glass could be made either transparent or opaque.

=== Medicine ===
The medical problems of the ancient Egyptians stemmed directly from their environment. Living and working close to the Nile brought hazards from malaria and debilitating schistosomiasis parasites, which caused liver and intestinal damage. Dangerous wildlife such as crocodiles and hippos were also a common threat. The lifelong labors of farming and building put stress on the spine and joints, and traumatic injuries from construction and warfare all took a significant toll on the body. The grit and sand from stone-ground flour abraded teeth, leaving them susceptible to abscesses (though caries were rare).

The diets of the wealthy were rich in sugars, which promoted periodontal disease. Despite the flattering physiques portrayed on tomb walls, the overweight mummies of many of the upper class show the effects of a life of overindulgence. Adult life expectancy was about 35 for men and 30 for women, but reaching adulthood was difficult as about one-third of the population died in infancy. (Note: Figures are given for adult life expectancy and do not reflect life expectancy at birth. (Filer (1995), p. 25))

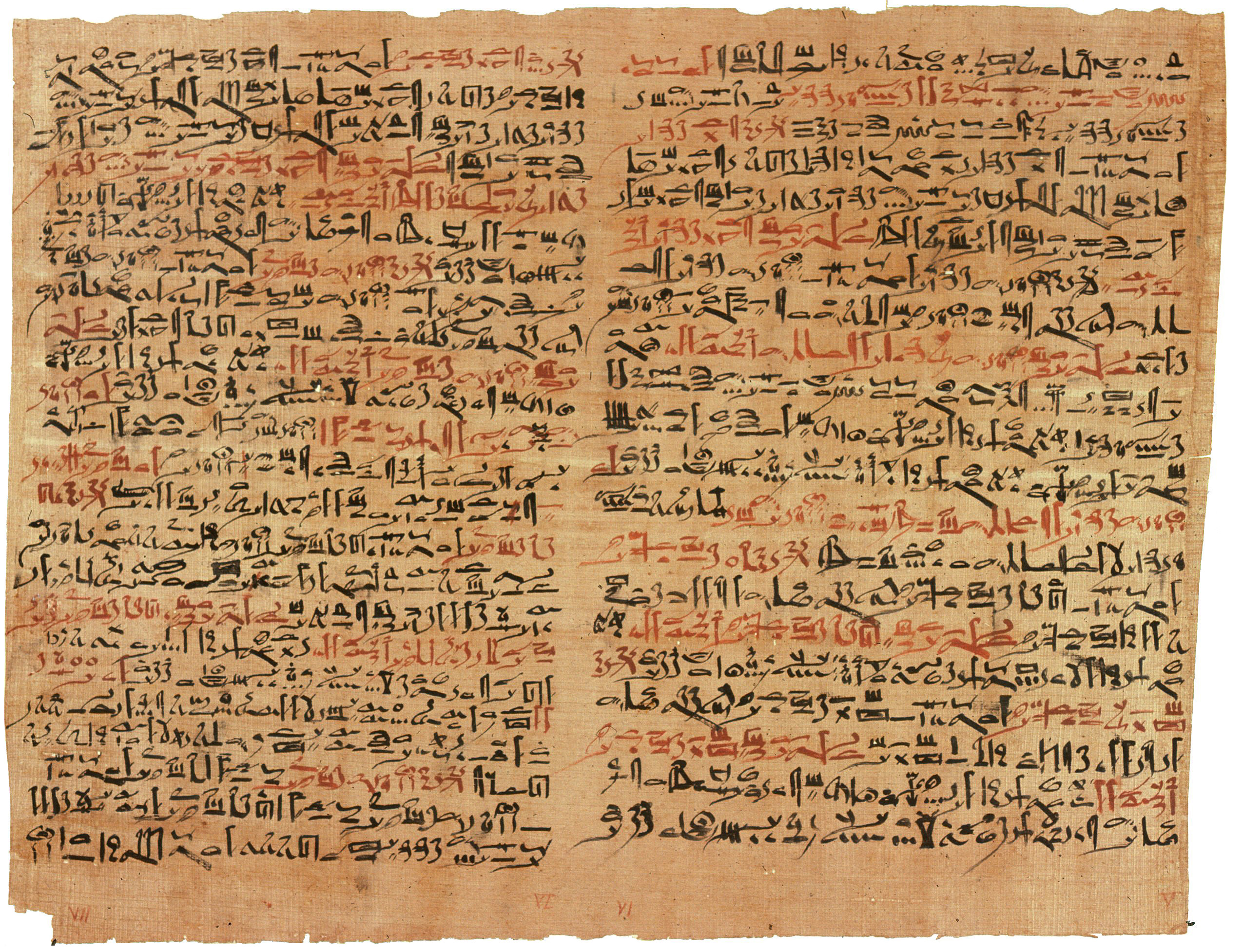
The Edwin Smith surgical papyrus describes anatomy and medical treatments, written in hieratic, c. 1550 BC.

Ancient Egyptian physicians were renowned in the ancient Near East for their healing skills, and some, such as Imhotep, remained famous long after their deaths. Herodotus remarked that there was a high degree of specialization among Egyptian physicians, with some treating only the head or the stomach, while others were eye-doctors and dentists. Training of physicians took place at the Per Ankh or "House of Life" institution, most notably those headquartered in Per-Bastet during the New Kingdom and at Abydos and Saïs in the Late period. Medical papyri show empirical knowledge of anatomy, injuries, and practical treatments.

Wounds were treated by bandaging with raw meat, white linen, sutures, nets, pads, and swabs soaked with honey to prevent infection, while opium, thyme, and belladonna were used to relieve pain. The earliest records of burn treatment describe burn dressings that use the milk from mothers of male babies. Prayers were made to the goddess Isis. Moldy bread, honey, and copper salts were also used to prevent infection from dirt in burns. Garlic and onions were used regularly to promote good health and were thought to relieve asthma symptoms. Ancient Egyptian surgeons stitched wounds, set broken bones, and amputated diseased limbs, but they recognized that some injuries were so serious that they could only make the patient comfortable until death occurred.

=== Maritime technology ===
Early Egyptians knew how to assemble planks of wood into a ship hull and had mastered advanced forms of shipbuilding as early as 3000 BC. The Archaeological Institute of America reports that the oldest planked ships known are the Abydos boats. A group of 14 discovered ships in Abydos were constructed of wooden planks "sewn" together. Discovered by Egyptologist David O'Connor of New York University, woven straps were found to have been used to lash the planks together, and reeds or grass stuffed between the planks helped to seal the seams. Because the ships are all buried together and near a mortuary belonging to Pharaoh Khasekhemwy, originally they were all thought to have belonged to him, but one of the 14 ships dates to 3000 BC, and the associated pottery jars buried with the vessels also suggest earlier dating. The ship dating to 3000 BC was 75 feet (23 m) long and is now thought to perhaps have belonged to an earlier pharaoh, perhaps one as early as Hor-Aha.

Early Egyptians also knew how to assemble planks of wood with treenails to fasten them together, using pitch for caulking the seams. The "Khufu ship", a 43.6-metre (143 ft) vessel sealed into a pit in the Giza pyramid complex at the foot of the Great Pyramid of Giza in the Fourth Dynasty around 2500 BC, is a full-size surviving example that may have filled the symbolic function of a solar barque. Early Egyptians also knew how to fasten the planks of this ship together with mortise and tenon joints.

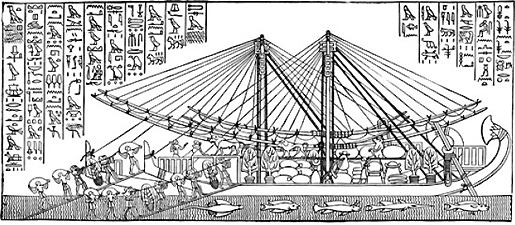
Seagoing ship of an expedition to Punt, from a relief of Hatshepsut's Mortuary temple, Deir el-Bahari

Large seagoing ships are known to have been heavily used by the Egyptians in their trade with the city states of the eastern Mediterranean, especially Byblos (on the coast of modern-day Lebanon), and in several expeditions down the Red Sea to the Land of Punt. In fact one of the earliest Egyptian words for a seagoing ship is a "Byblos Ship", which originally defined a class of Egyptian seagoing ships used on the Byblos run; however, by the end of the Old Kingdom, the term had come to include large seagoing ships, whatever their destination.

In 1977, an ancient north–south canal was discovered extending from Lake Timsah to the Ballah Lakes. It was dated to the Middle Kingdom of Egypt by extrapolating dates of ancient sites constructed along its course. (Note: See Suez Canal.)

In 2011, archaeologists from Italy, the United States, and Egypt, excavating a dried-up lagoon known as Mersa Gawasis, unearthed traces of an ancient harbor that once launched early voyages, such as Hatshepsut's Punt, expedition onto the open ocean. Some of the site's most evocative evidence for the ancient Egyptians' seafaring prowess include large ship timbers and hundreds of feet of ropes, made from papyrus, coiled in huge bundles. In 2013, a team of Franco-Egyptian archaeologists discovered what is believed to be the world's oldest port, dating back about 4500 years, from the time of King Khufu, on the Red Sea coast, near Wadi el-Jarf (about 110 miles south of Suez).

=== Mathematics ===
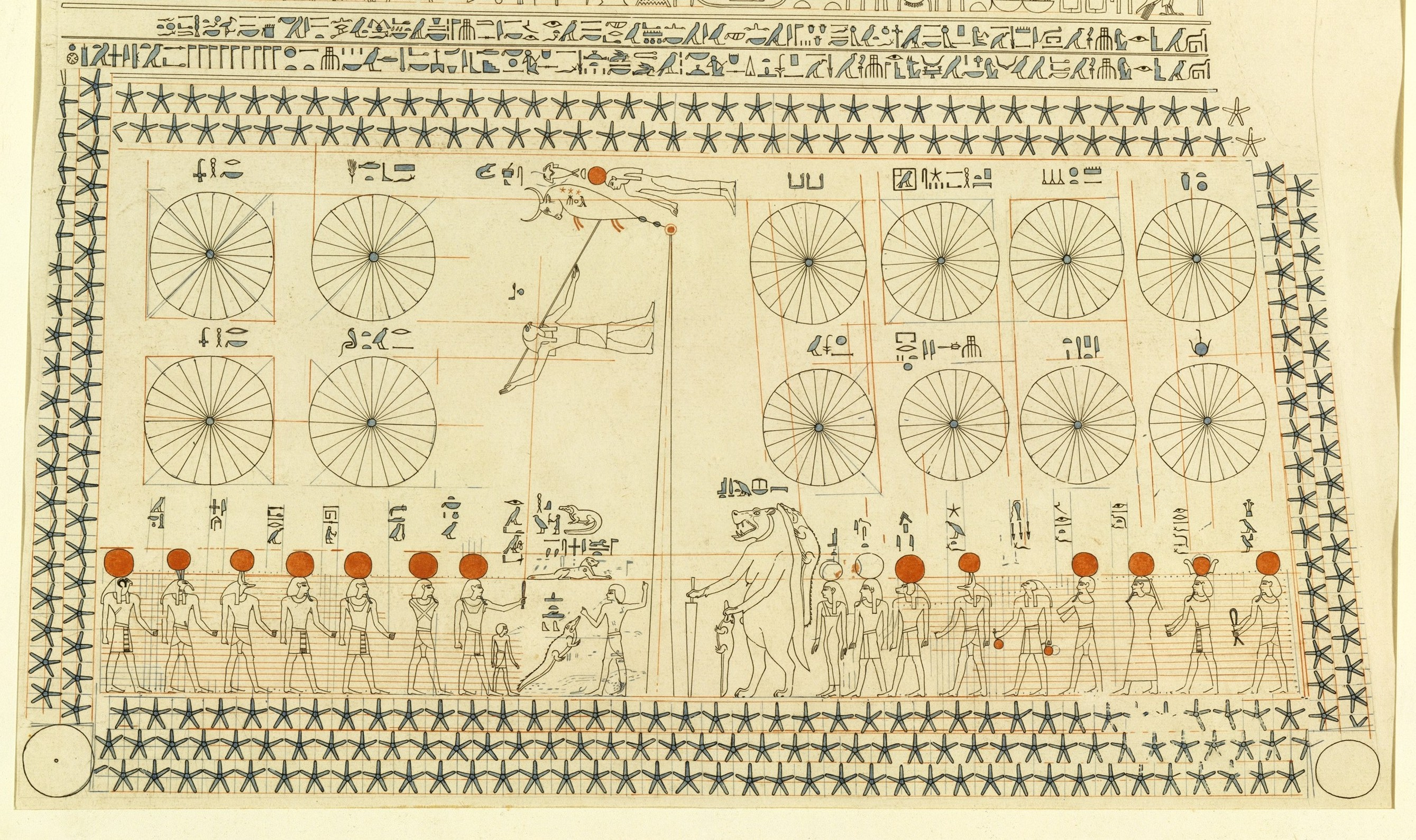
Facsimile of the Astronomical chart in Senemut's tomb, 18th dynasty

The earliest attested examples of mathematical calculations date to the predynastic Naqada period, and show a fully developed numeral system. (Note: Understanding of Egyptian mathematics is incomplete due to paucity of available material and lack of exhaustive study of the texts that have been uncovered (Imhausen (2007), p. 13).) The importance of mathematics to an educated Egyptian is suggested by a New Kingdom fictional letter in which the writer proposes a scholarly competition between himself and another scribe regarding everyday calculation tasks such as accounting of land, labor, and grain. Texts such as the Rhind Mathematical Papyrus and the Moscow Mathematical Papyrus show that the ancient Egyptians could perform the four basic mathematical operations—addition, subtraction, multiplication, and division—use fractions, calculate the areas of rectangles, triangles, and circles and compute the volumes of boxes, columns and pyramids. They understood basic concepts of algebra and geometry, and could solve systems of equations. Nubians also exercised a trigonometric methodology comparable to their Egyptian counterparts.

D22
2/3
in hieroglyphs

Mathematical notation was decimal, and based on hieroglyphic signs for each power of ten up to one million. Each of these could be written as many times as necessary to add up to the desired number; so to write the number eighty or eight hundred, the symbol for ten or one hundred was written eight times respectively. Because their methods of calculation could not handle most fractions with a numerator greater than one, they had to write fractions as the sum of several fractions. For example, they resolved the fraction two-fifths into the sum of one-third + one-fifteenth. Standard tables of values facilitated this. Some common fractions, however, were written with a special glyph—the equivalent of the modern two-thirds is shown on the right.

Ancient Egyptian mathematicians knew the Pythagorean theorem as an empirical formula. They were aware, for example, that a triangle had a right angle opposite the hypotenuse when its sides were in a 3–4–5 ratio. They were able to estimate the area of a circle by subtracting one-ninth from its diameter and squaring the result:

Area ≈ [(8/9)D]^{2} = (256/81)r^{2} ≈ 3.16r^{2},

a reasonable approximation of the formula πr^{2}.

== Population ==
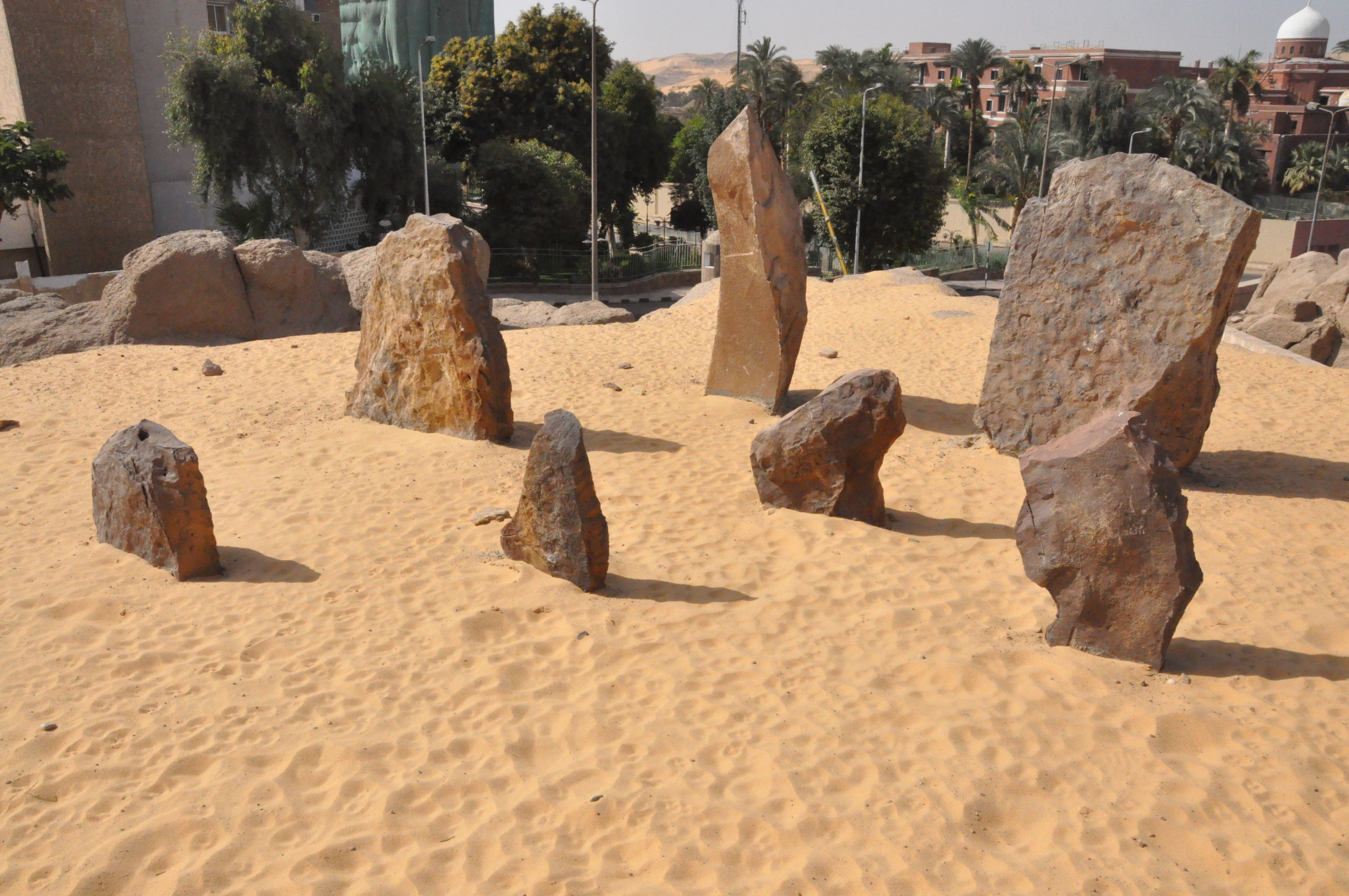
Megaliths from Nabta Playa, constructed by Neolithic populations, located in Aswan, Upper Egypt.

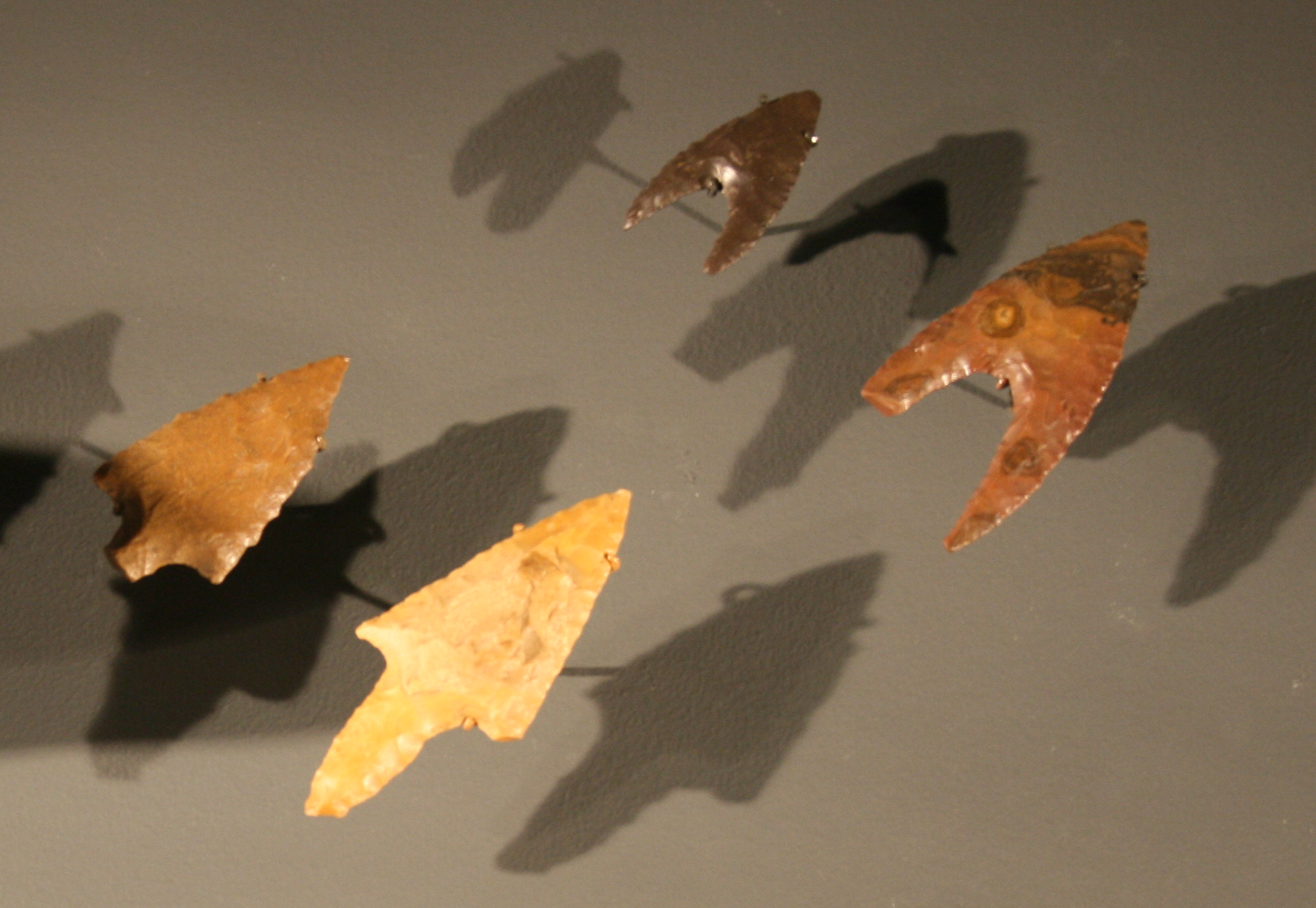
Arrowheads from Al Faiyum, Lower Egypt

Estimates of the size of the population range from 1–1.5 million in the 3rd millennium BC to possibly 2–3 million by the 1st millennium BC, before growing significantly towards the end of that millennium.

Historical scholarship has generally regarded the peopling of the Egyptian Nile Valley from archaeological and biological data, to be the result of interaction between coastal northern Africans, "neolithic" Saharans, Nilotic hunters, and riverine proto-Nubians with some influence and migration from the Levant.

International scholarship reflected in the UNESCO General History of Africa book series have expressed a similar position. A majority of the scholars that contributed to the Volume II edition (1981) considered Egypt an indigenous African civilisation with a mixed population that originated largely in the Sahara and featured a variety of skin colours from north and south of the Saharan region. In the view of Egyptian scholar and featured editor, Gamal Mokhtar, Upper Egypt and Nubia held "similar ethnic composition" with comparable material culture. An updated Volume IX publication launched in 2025, reaffirmed the view that Egypt had African and Eurasian populations. The review section which focused on the 1974 "Peopling of Egypt" symposium stated that accumulated research over three decades had confirmed the migration from Southernly African along with Saharan populations into the early Nile Valley. Upper Egypt was now positioned as a origin point of Pharaonic unification, with supporting archaeological, anthropological, genetic and linguistic sources of evidence having identified close affinities between Upper Egypt and other Sub-Saharan African populations.

Pharaonic reunification and the reinvigoration of Egyptian culture has been attributed primarily to several dynasties of Upper Egyptian or southern origin, which included the 11th, 12th, 17th, 18th and 25th dynasties, after periods of fragmentation.

=== Archaeogenetics ===
According to historian William Stiebling and archaeologist Susan N. Helft, conflicting DNA analysis on recent genetic samples such as the Amarna royal mummies has led to a lack of consensus on the genetic makeup of the ancient Egyptians and their geographic origins.

The genetic history of Ancient Egypt remains a developing field, and is relevant for the understanding of population demographic events connecting Africa and Eurasia. To date, the amount of genome-wide aDNA analyses on ancient specimens from Egypt and Sudan remain scarce, although studies on uniparental haplogroups in ancient individuals have been carried out several times, pointing broadly to affinities with other African and Eurasian groups.

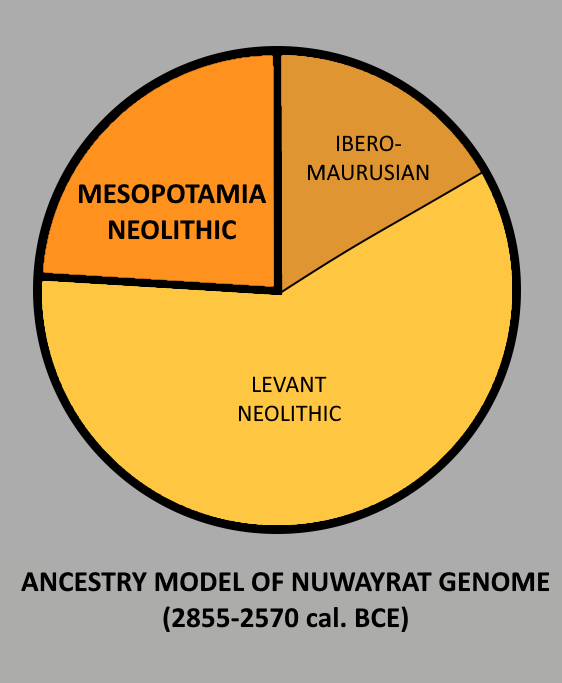
Ancestry model of Egyptian genome NUE001 from Nuwayrat (2855–2570 BC).

The currently most advanced full genome analyses was published in a 2025 article by the scientific journal Nature, a whole-genome genetic study of an Old Kingdom adult male Egyptian of relatively high-status, codenamed "Old Kingdom individual (NUE001)", who was radiocarbon-dated to 2855–2570 BC, with funerary practices archeologically attributed to the Third and Fourth Dynasty, excavated in Nuwayrat (Nuerat, نويرات), in a cliff 265 km south of Cairo. Before this study, whole-genome sequencing of ancient Egyptians from the early periods of Egyptian Dynastic history had not yet been accomplished, mainly because of the problematic DNA preservation conditions in Egypt. The corpse had been placed intact in a large circular clay pot without embalming, and then installed inside a cliff tomb, which accounts for the comparatively good level of conservation of the skeleton and its DNA. Most of his genome was found to be associated with North African Neolithic ancestry, but about 20% of his genetic ancestry could be sourced to the eastern Fertile Crescent, including Mesopotamia. Overall, the 2025 study "provides direct evidence of genetic ancestry related to the eastern Fertile Crescent in ancient Egypt". This genetic connection suggests that there had been ancient migration flows from the eastern Fertile Crescent to Egypt, in addition to the exchanges of objects and imagery (domesticated animals and plants, writing systems...) already observed. This suggests a pattern of wide cultural and demographic expansion from the Mesopotamian region, which affected both Anatolia and Egypt during this period. The authors acknowledged some limitations of the study, such as the results deriving from one single Egyptian genome and known limitations predicting specific phenotypic traits in understudied populations. The analysis also excluded any substantial ancestry in the Nuwayrat genome related to a previously published 4,500-year-old hunter-gatherer genome from the Mota cave in Ethiopia, or other individuals in central, eastern, or southern Africa.

An earlier partial genomic analyses had been made on much later specimens recovered from the Nile River Valley, Abusir el-Meleq, Egypt, dating from the 787 BC-23 AD time period. Two of the individuals were dated to the Pre-Ptolemaic Period (New Kingdom to Late Period), and one individual to the Ptolemaic Period. These results point to a genetic continuity of Ancient Egyptians with modern Egyptians. The results further point to a close genetic affinity between ancient Egyptians and Middle Eastern populations, especially ancient groups from the Levant.

Ancient Egyptians also displayed affinities to Nubians to the south of Egypt, in modern-day Sudan. Archaeological and historical evidence support interactions between Egyptian and Nubian populations more than 5000 years ago, with socio-political dynamics between Egyptians and Nubians ranging from peaceful coexistence to variably successful attempts of conquest. A study on sixty-six ancient Nubian individuals revealed significant contact with ancient Egyptians, characterized by the presence of c. 57% Neolithic/Bronze Age Levantine ancestry in these individuals. Such geneflow of Levantine-like ancestry corresponds with archaeological and botanic evidence, pointing to a Neolithic movement around 7,000 years ago.

Modern Egyptians, like modern Nubians, also underwent subsequent admixture events, contributing both "Sub-Saharan" African-like and West Asian-like ancestries, since the Roman period, with significance on the African Slave Trade and the Spread of Islam.

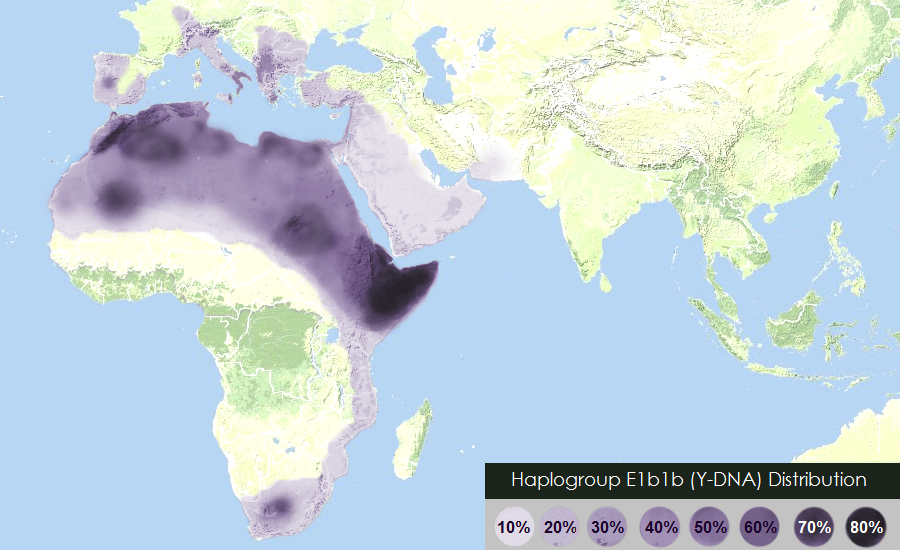
E1b1b is the most common paternal haplogroup across Africa, including Egypt, with modern genetic studies rooting the origin of the E haplogroup in East Africa.

Genetic analysis of a modern Upper Egyptian population in Adaima by Eric Crubézy had identified genetic markers common across Africa, with 71% of the Adaima samples carrying E1b1 haplogroup and 3% carrying the L0f mitochondrial haplogroup. A secondary review, published in UNESCO General History of Africa Volume IX, in 2025 noted the results were preliminary and need to be confirmed by other laboratories with new sequencing methods. This was supported by an anthropological study which found the notable presence of dental markers, characteristic of Khoisan people, in a predynastic-era cemetery at Adaïma. The genetic marker E1b1 was identified in a number of genetic studies to have wide distribution across Egypt, with "P2/215/M35.1 (E1b1b), for short M35, likely also originated in eastern tropical Africa, and is predominantly distributed in an arc from the Horn of Africa up through Egypt". Multiple STR analyses of the Amarna royal mummies (including Rameses III, Tutankhamun and Amenhotep III) were deployed to estimate their ethnicity have found they had strong affinities with modern Sub-Saharan populations. Nonetheless, these forms of analysis were not exhaustive as only 8 of the 13 CODIS markers were used.

Some scholars, such as Christopher Ehret, caution that a wider sampling area is needed and argue that the current data is inconclusive on the origin of ancient Egyptians. They also point out issues with the previously used methodology such as the sampling size, comparative approach and a "biased interpretation" of the genetic data. They argue in favor for a link between Ancient Egypt and the northern Horn of Africa. This latter view has been attributed to the corresponding archaeological, genetic, linguistic and biological anthropological sources of evidence which broadly indicate that the earliest Egyptians and Nubians were the descendants of populations in Northeast Africa.

=== Race and ethnicity ===
Mainstream scholars have situated the ethnicity and the origins of predynastic, southern Egypt as a foundational community primarily in northeast Africa which included the Sudan, tropical Africa and the Sahara whilst recognising the population variability that became characteristic of the pharaonic period. Pharaonic Egypt featured a physical gradation across the regional populations, with Upper Egyptians having shared more biological affinities with Sudanese and southernly African populations, whereas Lower Egyptians had closer genetic links with Levantine and Mediterranean populations. In the view of William Stiebling and Susan Helft, "some ancient Egyptians looked more Middle Eastern and others looked more Sudanese or Ethiopians of today, and some may even have looked like other groups in Africa". Overall, the authors reached the conclusion that Ancient Egypt was a heterogeneous civilization with bio-cultural connections across Africa and Eurasia.

Recent studies have emphasized that Ancient Egypt contained much greater ethnic diversity than traditionally assumed in earlier historical approaches. Egyptian notions of identity were formed mainly through social constructs, rather than adhering to fixed biological groups. Riggs and Baines note that the common ideological contrast between "Egyptian" and "Other" oversimplifies population groups which varied according to local traditions, dialects, and naming practices. Archaeological evidence also shows foreigners lived in Egypt, particularly Nubians, Libyans and Asiatics. They would frequently participate in activities that which crossed the social divide described by Riggs and Baines. Furthermore, Smith highlights that while state ideology portrayed outsiders through negative stereotypes, evidence regarding everyday interactions, intermarriage, shared foodways, and visual self-presentations demonstrate that ethnic boundaries flexible across social and political contexts.

A number of scholars have argued that Ancient Egyptians shared cultural connections and origins with the Land of Punt. This has been accredited to the Egyptian textual descriptions of Puntland as Ta Nejter which translates into "God's Land", along with temple reliefs which depicted Puntites with reddish-brown skin complexions similar to their Egyptian counterparts.

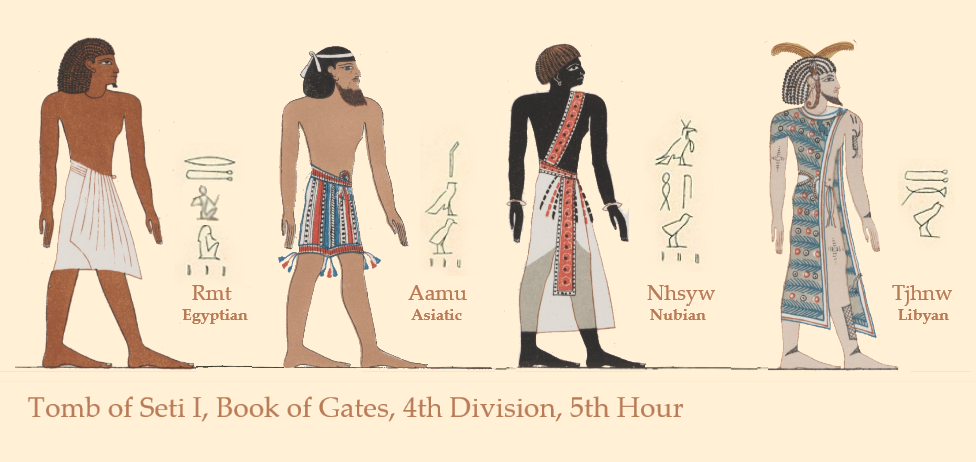
From left to right: an Egyptian, an Asiatic, a Nubian, and a Libyan. It is based on an illustration from Richard Lepsius (1849–1856).

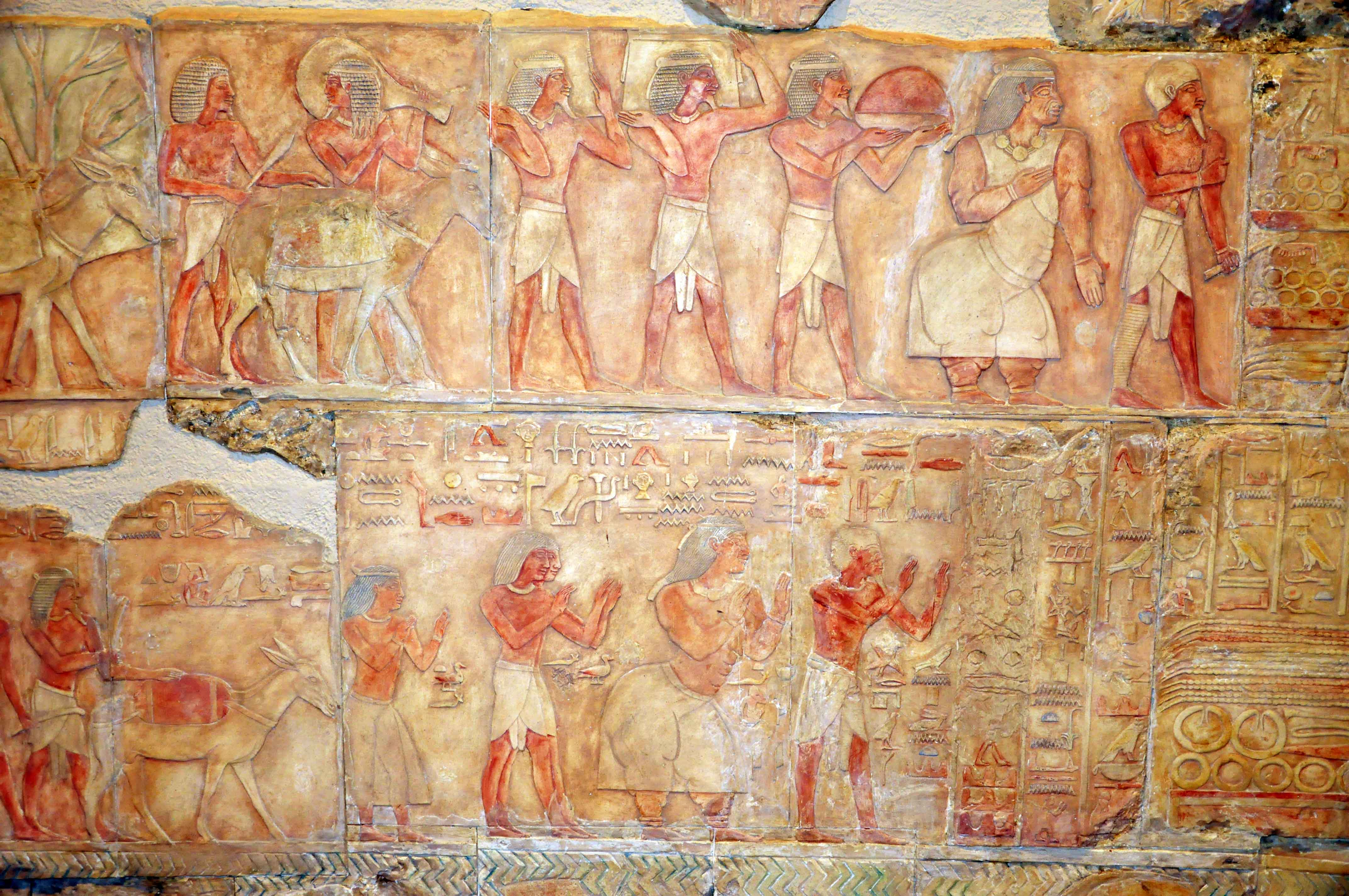
Puntites including their Queen, bearing tributes, represented in the classic reddish-brown colouring as Egyptians

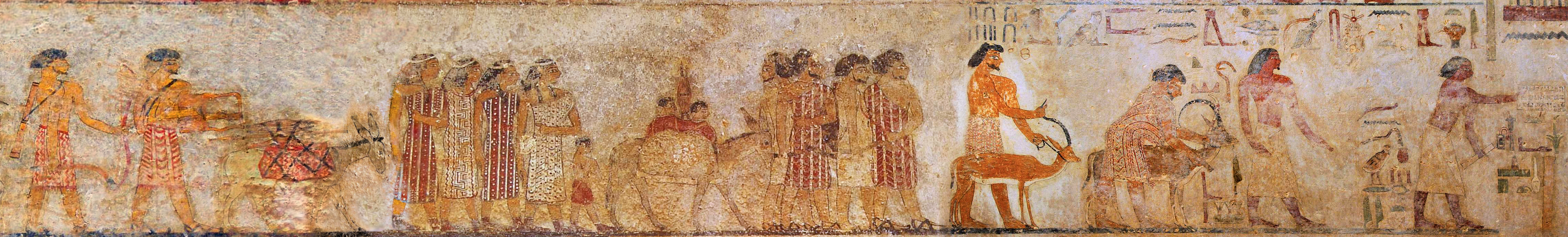
A group of West Asiatic foreigners, possibly Canaanites, labelled as Aamu (ꜥꜣmw), including the leading man with a Nubian ibex labelled as Abisha the Hyksos (𓋾𓈎𓐰𓈉, ḥqꜣ-ḫꜣsw, Heqa-kasut for "Hyksos"). Tomb of 12th-dynasty official Khnumhotep II, at Beni Hasan (c. 1890 BC).

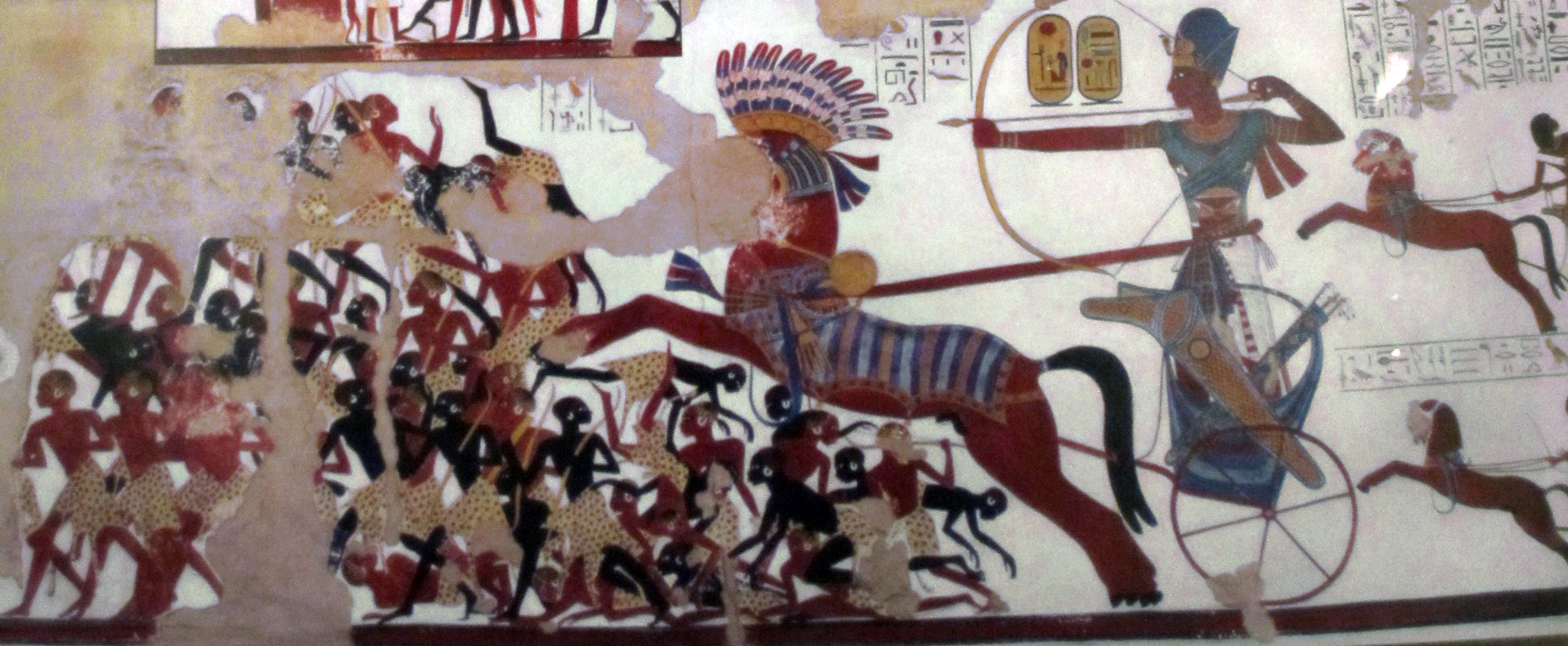
Ramesses II in his war chariot charging into battle against the Nubians. New Kingdom reliefs as seen in Rameses II temple, Beit el-Wali, represented Nubians with dark reddish brown and jet black skin tones.

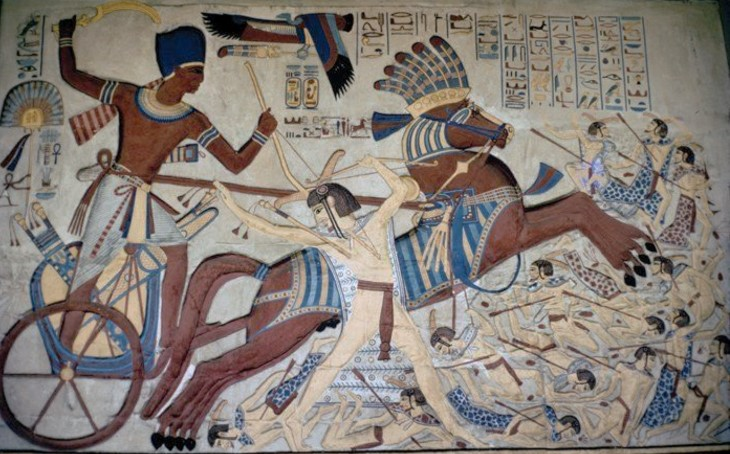
Seti I fighting Libyans, a relief at Karnak.

== Legacy ==
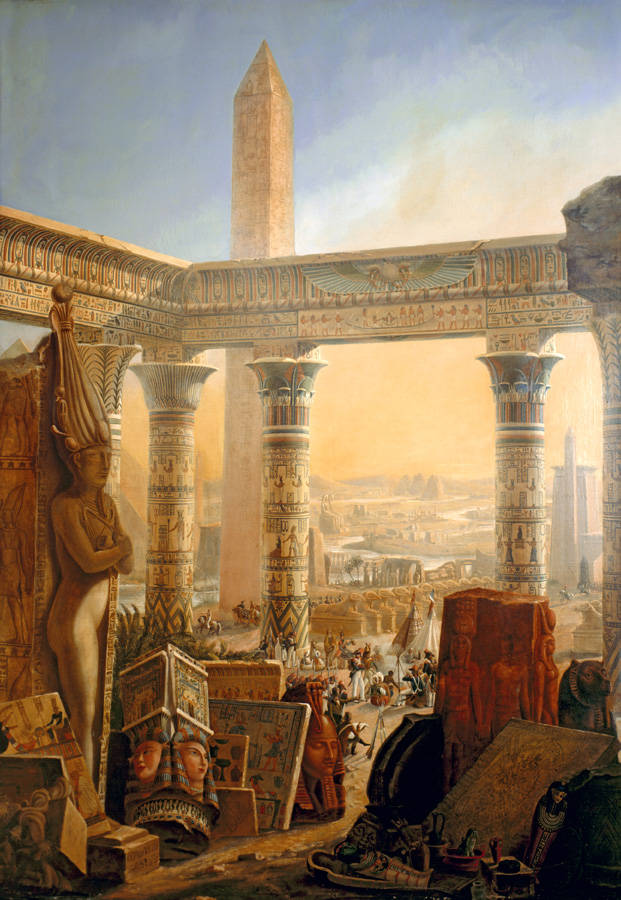
Frontispiece of Description de l'Égypte, published in 38 volumes between 1809 and 1829

The culture and monuments of ancient Egypt have left a lasting legacy. Egyptian civilization significantly influenced the Kingdom of Kush and Meroë with both adopting Egyptian religious and architectural norms (hundreds of pyramids (6–30 meters high) were built in Egypt/Sudan), as well as using Egyptian writing as the basis of the Meroitic script. Meroitic is the oldest written language in Africa, other than Egyptian, and was used from the 2nd century BC until the early 5th century AD. The cult of the goddess Isis, for example, became popular in the Roman Empire, as obelisks and other relics were transported back to Rome. The Romans also imported building materials from Egypt to erect Egyptian-style structures. Early historians such as Herodotus, Strabo, and Diodorus Siculus studied and wrote about the land, which Romans came to view as a place of mystery.

During the Middle Ages and the Renaissance, Egyptian pagan culture was in decline after the rise of Christianity and later Islam, but interest in Egyptian antiquity continued in the writings of medieval scholars such as Dhul-Nun al-Misri and al-Maqrizi. In the seventeenth and eighteenth centuries, European travelers and tourists brought back antiquities and wrote stories of their journeys, leading to a wave of Egyptomania across Europe, as evident in symbolism such as the Eye of Providence and the Great Seal of the United States. This renewed interest sent collectors to Egypt, who took, purchased, or were given many important antiquities. Napoleon arranged the first studies in Egyptology when he brought some 150 scientists and artists to study and document Egypt's natural history, which was published in the Description de l'Égypte.

In the 20th century, the Egyptian Government and archaeologists alike recognized the importance of cultural respect and integrity in excavations. Since the 2010s, the Ministry of Tourism and Antiquities has overseen excavations and the recovery of artifacts.

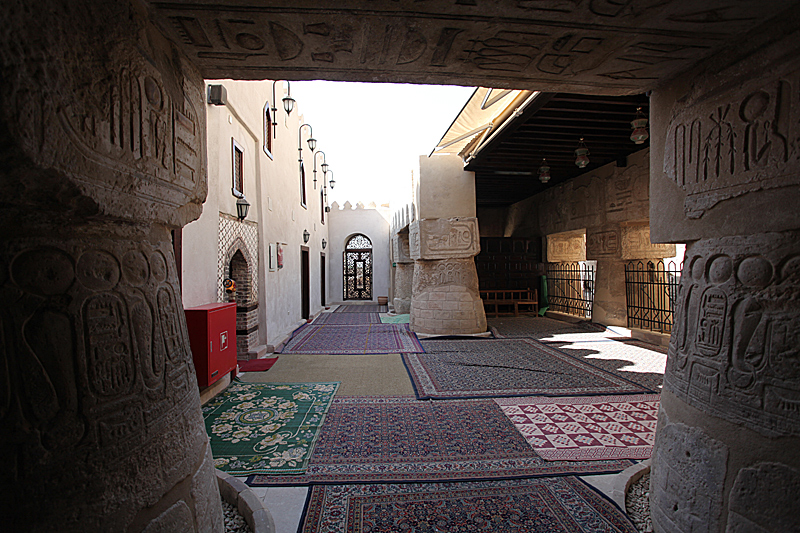
The Abu Haggag Mosque is integrated into the Luxor temple from the 14th century BC, which has made it the oldest continuously used temple

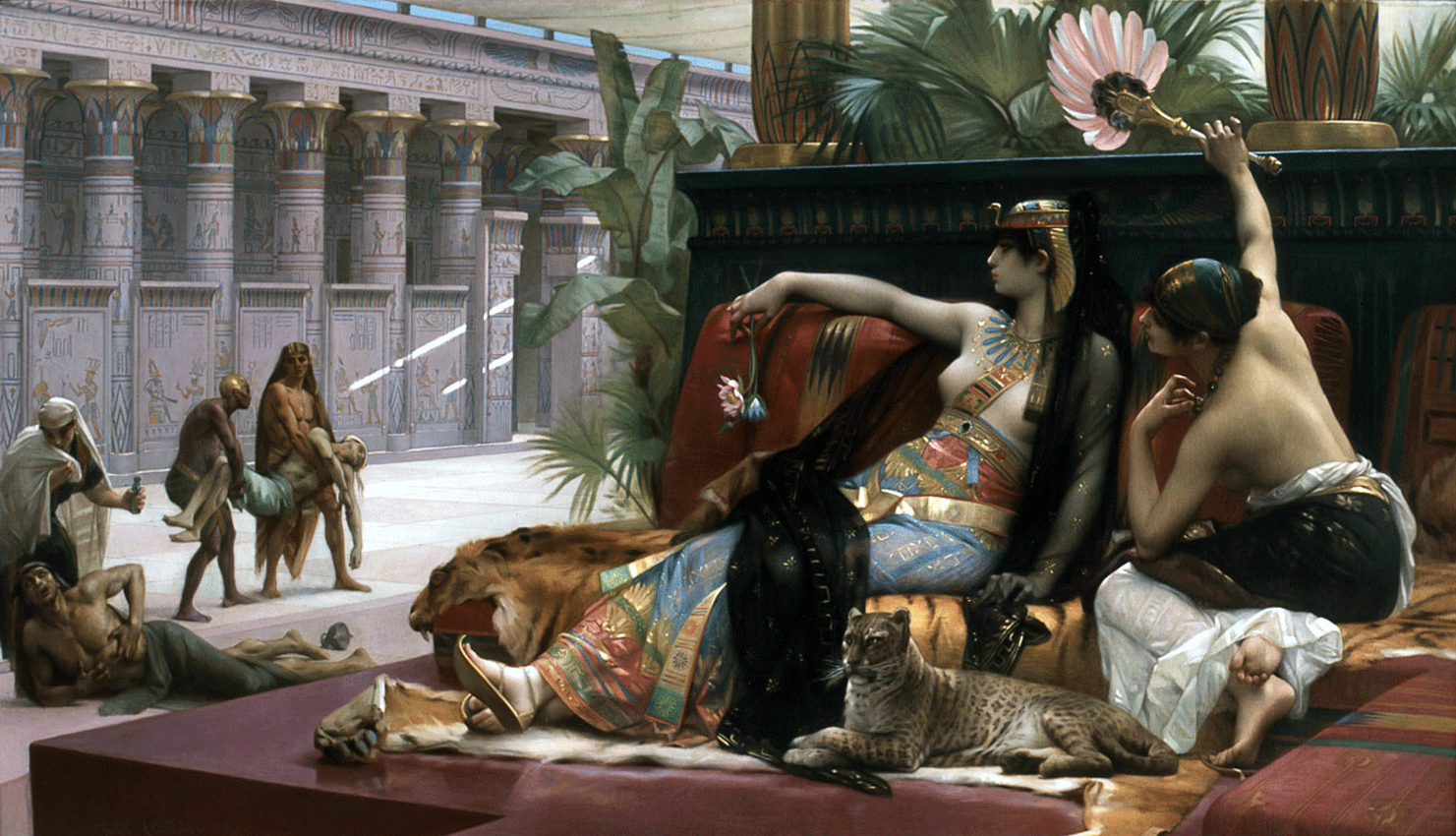
Cleopatra Testing Poisons on Condemned Prisoners (1887), by Alexandre Cabanel

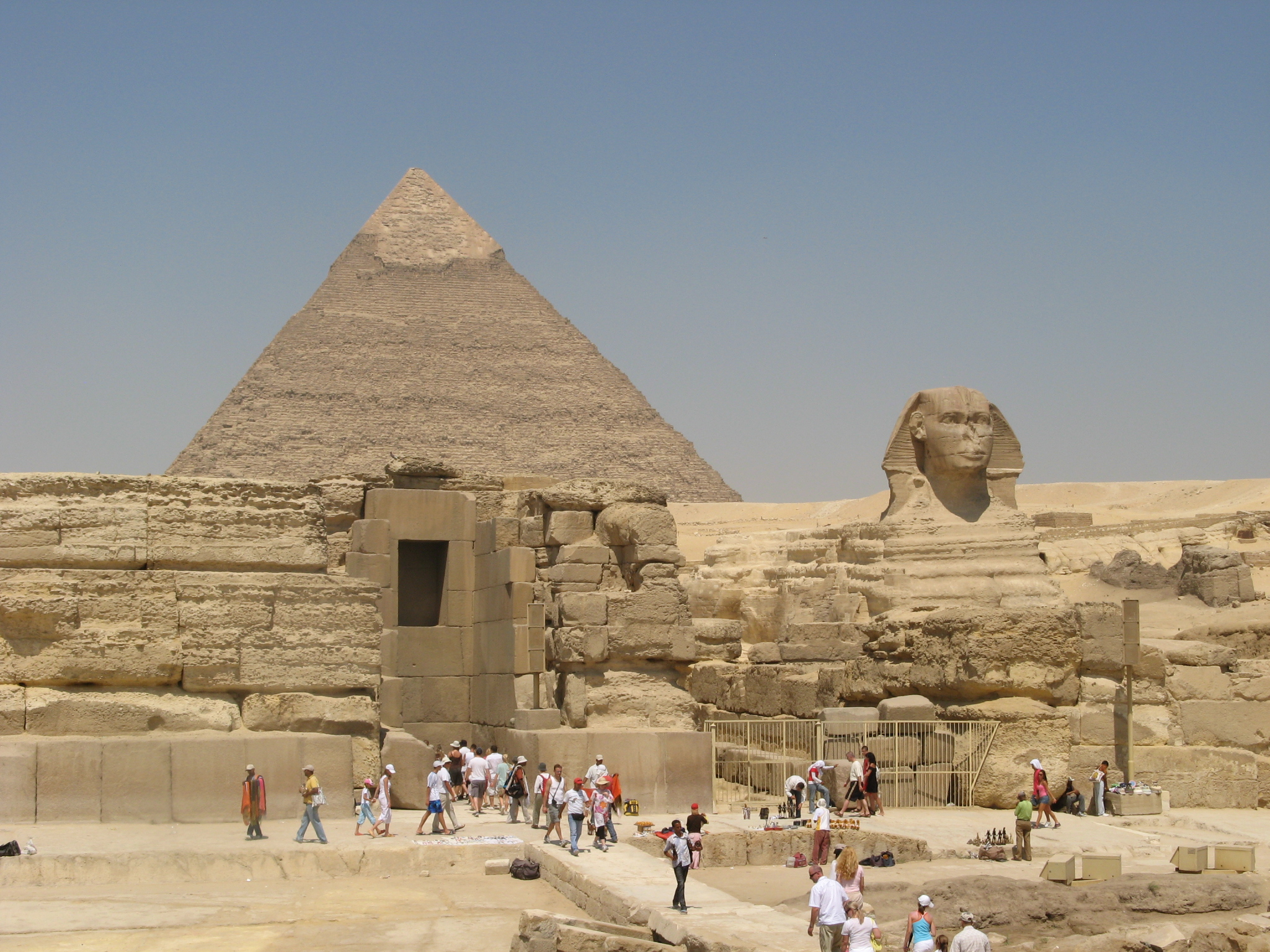
Tourists at the pyramid complex of Khafre near the Great Sphinx of Giza

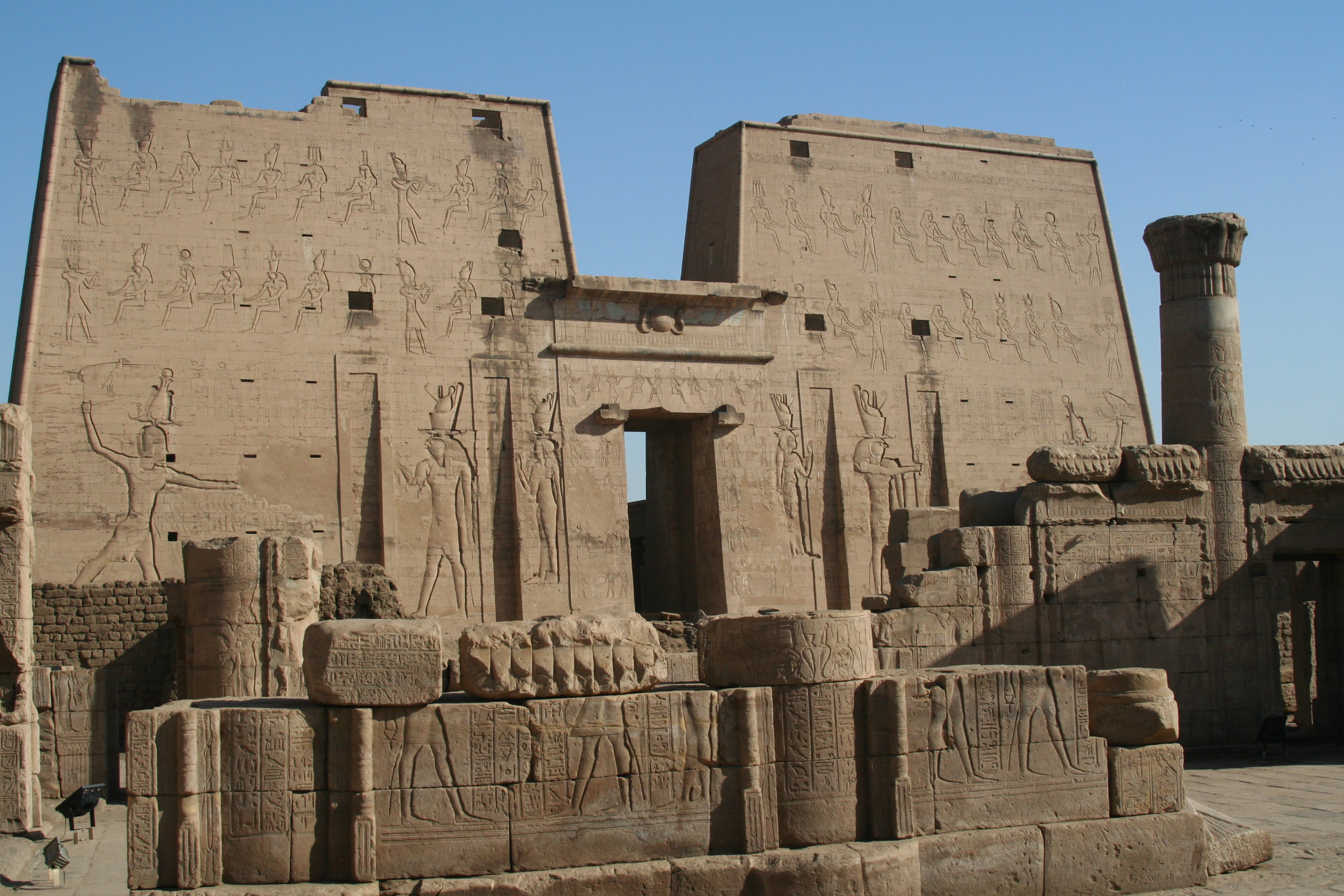
The preserved Temple of Horus at Edfu is a model of Egyptian architecture

== See also ==
- Dugurasu
- Egyptology
- Glossary of ancient Egypt artifacts
- Index of ancient Egypt–related articles
- Outline of ancient Egypt
- List of ancient Egyptians
- List of Ancient Egyptian inventions and discoveries
- Archaeology of Ancient Egypt
- Archeological Map of Egypt
- British school of diffusionism
