= Mathematics in Ancient Egypt: A Contextual History =

2016 book by Annette Imhausen

- First edition cover
- Author: Annette Imhausen
- Language: English
- Genre: Non-fiction
- Publisher: Princeton University Press
- Publication date: 2016
- Publication place: United States

Mathematics in Ancient Egypt: A Contextual History is a book on ancient Egyptian mathematics by Annette Imhausen. It was published by the Princeton University Press in 2016.

== Topics ==
The history of ancient Egyptian mathematics covers roughly three thousand years, and as well as sketching the mathematics of this period, the book also provides background material on the culture and society of the period, and the role played by mathematics in society. These aspects of the subject advance the goal of understanding Egyptian mathematics in its cultural context rather than (as in much earlier work on the mathematics of ancient cultures) trying to translate it into modern mathematical ideas and notation. Particular emphases of the book are the elite status of the scribes, the Egyptian class entrusted with mathematical calculations, the practical rather than theoretical approach to mathematics taken by the scribes, and the ways that Egyptian conceptualizations of numbers affected the methods they used to solve mathematical problems.

In keeping with that change in emphasis, the book is ordered by time period rather than by mathematical topics. After an introduction that reviews past studies of the subject and calls for a reassessment of their conclusions, it divides its history into five major eras: prehistoric Egypt and the Early Dynastic Period, the Old Kingdom of Egypt, the Middle Kingdom of Egypt, the New Kingdom of Egypt, and Hellenistic and Roman Egypt.

The topics covered in the book include the Egyptian numbering systems, in both spoken and written (hieroglyphic) form, arithmetic, Egyptian fractions, and systems of measurement, their lunar calendar, calculations of volumes of solids, and word problems involving the measurement of beer and grain. As well, it covers the use of mathematics by the scribes in architectural design and the measurement of land. Although much past effort has gone into questions such as trying to deduce the rules used by the scribes to calculate their tables of representations of fractions of the form 2/n, that sort of mathematical exercise has been avoided here in place of a description of how the Egyptians used these tables and their other mathematical methods in solving practical problems.

Because documents recording Egyptian mathematical knowledge are scarce, much of the book's history comes from other less directly mathematical objects, including the Egyptian architectural accomplishments, their burial goods, and their tax records, administrative writings, and literature. The book also discusses the mathematical problems and their solutions recorded from the small number of surviving mathematical documents including the Rhind papyrus, Lahun Mathematical Papyri, Moscow Mathematical Papyrus, Egyptian Mathematical Leather Roll, Carlsberg papyrus 30, and the Ostraca Senmut 153 and Turin 57170, placed in context by comparison with other less directly mathematical objects and texts from ancient Egypt, such as Instruction of Amenemope, Papyrus Harris I, Wilbour Papyrus, and Papyrus Anastasi I.

== Audience and reception ==
The audience for this book, according to reviewer Kevin Davis, is "mid-way between a specialised and a general readership". Alex Criddle echoes this opinion, suggesting that "those without a special interest in mathematics may find it very dry and hard to understand" but that it should be read by "anyone interested in the history of mathematics, egyptology, or Egyptian culture". Although little specialized knowledge is needed to read this book, readers are expected to understand the basic concepts of modern arithmetic, and to have a general idea of Egyptian geography. Reviewer Victor Pambuccian sees the book as excessively hostile towards the mathematical study of Egyptian mathematics, while reviewer Stephen Chrisomalis sees it as bridging a longstanding gap between historians of the ancient world and historians of mathematics, and sees the book as aimed primarily at specialists in these fields.

Pambuccian faults the book for miscrediting later historians with insights that repeated those of Oswald Spengler, and Chrisomalis takes issue with the book's treatment of hieratic numerals as being equivalent to decimal for the purposes of calculation. Martine Jansen asks for more examples,, and similarly reviewer Joaquim Eurico Anes Duarte Nogueira suggests that more photos and added material on Egyptian games would have made the presentation more appealing. Nogueira also complains that the heavy use of notation based on that of the Egyptians, rather than translation into modern notation, makes the work hard to follow. He adds that although it seems aimed at a popular audience he thinks it will be of more interest to specialists in this area. In contrast, reviewer Glen Van Brummelen writes that the book's "explanations are thorough and generally easy to understand, even for an interested lay person", and reviewer Calvin Johnsma specifically praises the book's efforts to present ancient Egyptian mathematics for what it was rather than converting it into modern forms, avoiding the anachronistic distortions of modern algebraic notation. On the other hand, Johnsma would have preferred to see deeper coverage of the algebraic nature of Egyptian problem-solving techniques, of their changing notions of fractions, and of their geometry.

Although Nogueira calls the book "good, but not excellent", some other reviewers are more positive. Reviewer H. Rindler calls it "an excellent introduction to the current state of knowledge", Davis calls it "head and shoulders above others" on the same topic, and Johnsma calls it "a deeply informed up-to-date contextual history", "masterful", and "highly accessible" to non-experts.
