= Heqanakht Papyri =

Piece of Ancient Egyptian literature

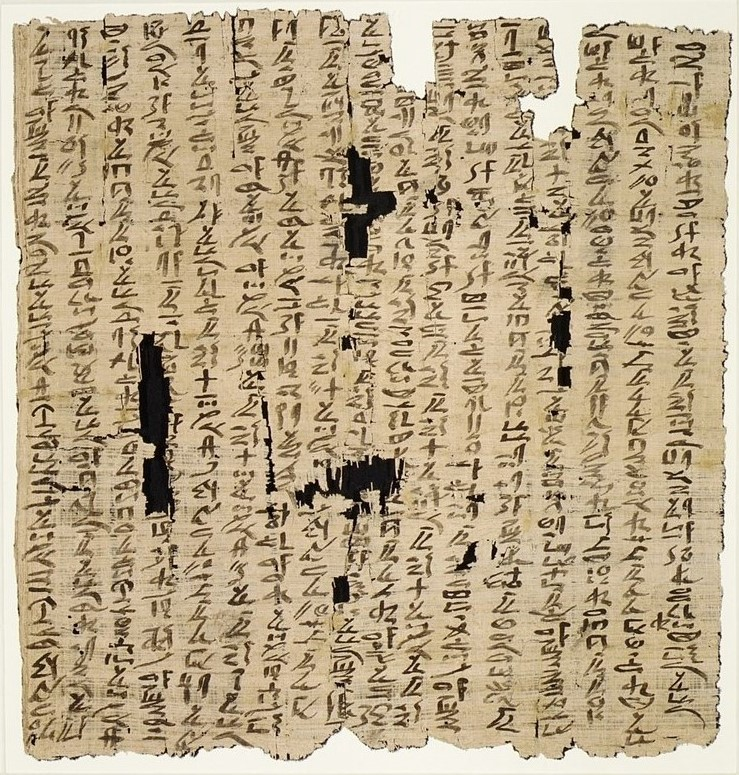
- Heqanakht papyrus (MM 22.3.516) on display in the Metropolitan Museum of Art
- Created: c. 1950 BC
- Discovered: before 1954; Egypt
- Present location: New York City, New York, United States

The Heqanakht Papyri or Heqanakht letters (also spelled Hekanakht) are a group of papyri dating to the early Middle Kingdom of Ancient Egypt that were found in the tomb complex of Vizier Ipi. Their find was located in the burial chamber of a servant named Meseh, which was to the right side of the courtyard of Ipi's burial complex. It is believed that the papyri were accidentally mixed into debris used to form a ramp to push the coffin of Meseh into the chamber. The papyri contain letters and accounts written by (or on behalf of) Heqanakht, a ka-priest of Ipi. Heqanakht himself was obliged to stay in the Theban area (probably because of his responsibilities in the necropolis), and thus wrote letters to his family, probably located somewhere near the capital of Egypt at that time, near the Faiyum. These letters and accounts were somehow lost and thus preserved. The significance of the papers is that they give rare and valuable information about lives of ordinary members of the lower upper class of Egypt during this period.

== Scholarship ==
These papyri have been published and discussed several times. Cerny and Baer dwelt on economic and social issues, relating to land tenure, land ownership, monetary units and similar topics. Silver discussed macro and micro aspects of the commodity wages paid to estate workers, and other commodity monetary transactions cited in the Heqanakht papers. James and Allen prepared complete translations with commentaries, while Wente offered translations. The materials allowed people to understand both domestic squabbles and household management during that time.

== Significance ==
In the monetary system at the time of the papyri's creation, rent and taxes were generally (but not invariably) paid to Pharaoh in grain. For example, the text reports:

Furthermore behold, 15 sacks of emmer are in the possession of Nenek-su (nnk-sw) at Hut-haa (Hw.t-hAA) and 13 (sacks ?) and 5 (bushels ?) of Lower Egyptian barley are in the possession of Ipi the Younger (jpj-Xrd) at Yusebek (jw-sbk). That which is in the possession of Neher's (nHr) son Ipi (jpj) at Sepat-mat (spA.t-mA.t) (amounts to) 20 (sacks of) emmer and (in the possession of) his brother Desher (dSr) 3 (sacks). The total is 38 (sacks of emmer and) 13 (sacks) and 5 (bushel ?) (of Lower Egyptian barley). Concerning anyone who will give me oil in payment - he shall give me 1 hbn.t-jar for 2 (sacks) of Lower Egyptian barley or for 3 (sacks) of emmer.

In terms of the understanding of what one would call "money," Heqanakht clearly calculated values in grain (particularly barley). However, he was able to convert this without difficulties into equivalent values in oil, textiles or copper. He both expected and offered payments in different commodities. For general purposes, however, he only valued new barley himself and was perfectly willing to put his family on short rations in the hope of profit (as Baer noted). On the other hand, however, once a temporary shortage was overcome, he did not view the grain as being particularly valuable: its use value was nil when the family was fed and its exchange value did not exist when his family needed to be fed.

For example: "Record of the household's incomes: Ipi (jpj) and her servant woman 8 (heqat), Hetepet (Htp.t) and her servant woman 8 (heqat), Heti's (Ht) son Nakht (nxt) together with his dependants 8 (heqat), Merisu (mr.sw) and his dependants 8 (heqat), Sahathor (zA-Hwt-Hr) 8 (heqat), Sanebnut (ZA-nb-n'.t) 7 (heqat), Anpu (jnp) 4 (heqat), Snefru (snfr.w) 4 (heqat), Sa-inut (zA-jnw.t) 4 (heqat), Mai-sa-hetepet (may-zA-Htp.t) 5 (heqat), Nofret (nfr.t) 3½ (heqat), Satwerut (zA.t-wr.wt) (?) 2 (heqat): Total 79½ (heqat)").

The papyri are also significant to the study of ancient economic thought, accountancy, and the history of Egyptian fractions and Egyptian multiplication and division. The Akhmim Wooden Tablet, the Egyptian Mathematical Leather Roll, the RMP 2/n table, the Rhind Mathematical Papyrus, the Ebers Papyrus and other mathematical texts reported expected and observed Egyptian fractions totals. Totals were written in quotients and scaled/unscaled remainder units. A meta context of the Egyptian Middle Kingdom weights and measures system had empowered one of the earliest Ancient Near East monetary systems. The Egyptian economy was able to double-check its management elements by using double entry accounting, and theoretical or abstract weights and measures units.

== Heqanakht household ==
Heqanakht served as the funerary priest of a high official, a role which granted him a large estate. The yield and profits from this estate allowed him to keep a large family and maintain his lower upper class status.

The letters are from Heqanakht while he is away, carrying out his duties near Memphis, and are written to his eldest son, left in charge of the household, family and estate. The household consists of five sons, his mother, his daughter, and a new wife. This new wife has the title "hebesit", which does not quite imply the dignity of "mistress of the house". She is not accepted by the family. However, Heqanakht stresses the importance of their respect towards her.

== Inspiration for Death Comes as the End ==
Agatha Christie's 1944 murder mystery novel Death Comes as the End was inspired by her reading about the Heqanakht Papyri. The novel is set in Egypt around 2000 BC, features a character called Ipy and reference to the writing of accounts and letters. Christie had been considering writing a novel set in Ancient Egypt since Stephen Glanville urged her to do so in 1943, but did not undertake the task until Glanville found her a source that dealt with everyday life: the Heqanakht Papyri.

== See also ==
- List of papyri from ancient Egypt
