= Egyptian algebra =

In the history of mathematics, Egyptian algebra, as that term is used in this article, refers to algebra as it was developed and used in ancient Egypt. Ancient Egyptian mathematics as discussed here spans a time period ranging from c. 3000 BCE to c. 300 BCE.

There are limited surviving examples of ancient Egyptian algebraic problems. They appear in the Moscow Mathematical Papyrus (MMP) and in the Rhind Mathematical Papyrus (RMP), among others.

== Fractions ==
Known mathematical texts show that scribes used (least) common multiples to turn problems with fractions into problems using integers. The multiplicative factors were often recorded in red ink and are referred to as Red auxiliary numbers.

== Aha problems, linear equations and false position ==
P6 a M35
Aha
in hieroglyphs
Era: New Kingdom
(1550–1069 BC)

Aha problems involve finding unknown quantities (referred to as Aha) if the sum of the quantity and part(s) of it are given. The Rhind Mathematical Papyrus also contains four of these types of problems. Problems 1, 19, and 25 of the Moscow Papyrus are Aha problems. Problem 19 asks one to calculate a quantity taken 1 and one-half times and added to 4 to make 10. In modern mathematical notation, this linear equation is represented:

$$\frac{3}{2} x + 4 = 10.$$

Solving these Aha problems involves a technique called method of false position. The technique is also called the method of false assumption. The scribe would substitute an initial guess of the answer into the problem. The solution using the false assumption would be proportional to the actual answer, and the scribe would find the answer by using this ratio.

== Pefsu problems ==
10 of the 25 problems of the practical problems contained in the Moscow Mathematical Papyrus are pefsu problems. A pefsu measures the strength of the beer made from a heqat of grain.

$$\mbox{pefsu} = \frac{\mbox{number loaves of bread (or jugs of beer)}}{\mbox{number of heqats of grain}}.$$

A higher pefsu number means weaker bread or beer. The pefsu number is mentioned in many offering lists. For example, problem 8 translates as:

(1) Example of calculating 100 loaves of bread of pefsu 20
(2) If someone says to you: "You have 100 loaves of bread of pefsu 20
(3) to be exchanged for beer of pefsu 4
(4) like 1/2 1/4 malt-date beer
(5) First calculate the grain required for the 100 loaves of the bread of pefsu 20
(6) The result is 5 heqat. Then reckon what you need for a des-jug of beer like the beer called 1/2 1/4 malt-date beer
(7) The result is 1/2 of the heqat measure needed for des-jug of beer made from Upper-Egyptian grain.
(8) Calculate 1/2 of 5 heqat, the result will be 2 1/2
(9) Take this 2 1/2 four times
(10) The result is 10. Then you say to him:
(11) Behold! The beer quantity is found to be correct.

== Geometrical progressions ==
The use of the Horus eye fractions shows some (rudimentary) knowledge of geometrical progression. One unit was written as 1/2 + 1/4 + 1/8 + 1/16 + 1/32 + 1/64 + 1/64. But the last copy of 1/64 was written as 5 ro, thereby writing 1 = 1/2 + 1/4 + 1/8 + 1/16 + 1/32 + 1/64 + (5 ro). These fractions were further used to write fractions in terms of $1 / 2^k$ terms plus a remainder specified in terms of ro as shown in for instance the Akhmim wooden tablets.

== Arithmetical progressions ==
Knowledge of arithmetic progressions is also evident from the mathematical sources.
