= Ancient Egyptian mathematics =

Mathematics used in Ancient Egypt

Ancient Egyptian mathematics is the mathematics that was developed and used in Ancient Egypt c. 3000 to c. 300 BCE, from the Old Kingdom of Egypt until roughly the beginning of Hellenistic Egypt. The ancient Egyptians utilized a numeral system for counting and solving written mathematical problems, often involving multiplication and fractions. Evidence for Egyptian mathematics is limited to a scarce amount of surviving sources written on papyrus. From these texts it is known that ancient Egyptians understood concepts of geometry, such as determining the surface area and volume of three-dimensional shapes useful for architectural engineering, and algebra, such as the false position method and quadratic equations.

== Overview ==
Written evidence of the use of mathematics dates back to at least 3200 BC with the ivory labels found in Tomb U-j at Abydos. These labels appear to have been used as tags for grave goods and some are inscribed with numbers. Further evidence of the use of the base 10 number system can be found on the Narmer Macehead which depicts offerings of 400,000 oxen, 1,422,000 goats and 120,000 prisoners.

The evidence of the use of mathematics in the Old Kingdom (c. 2690–2180 BC) is scarce, but can be deduced from inscriptions on a wall near a mastaba in Meidum which gives guidelines for the slope of the mastaba. The lines in the diagram are spaced at a distance of one cubit and show the use of that unit of measurement.

The earliest true mathematical documents date to the 12th Dynasty (c. 1990–1800 BC). The Moscow Mathematical Papyrus, the Egyptian Mathematical Leather Roll, the Lahun Mathematical Papyri which are a part of the much larger collection of Kahun Papyri and the Berlin Papyrus 6619 all date to this period. The Rhind Mathematical Papyrus which dates to the Second Intermediate Period (c. 1650 BC) is said to be based on an older mathematical text from the 12th dynasty.

The Moscow Mathematical Papyrus and Rhind Mathematical Papyrus are so called mathematical problem texts. They consist of a collection of problems with solutions. These texts may have been written by a teacher or a student engaged in solving typical mathematics problems.

An interesting feature of ancient Egyptian mathematics is the use of unit fractions. The Egyptians used some special notation for fractions such as 1/2, 1/3 and 2/3 and in some texts for 3/4, but other fractions were all written as unit fractions of the form 1/n or sums of such unit fractions. Scribes used tables to help them work with these fractions. The Egyptian Mathematical Leather Roll for instance is a table of unit fractions which are expressed as sums of other unit fractions. The Rhind Mathematical Papyrus and some of the other texts contain 2/n tables. These tables allowed the scribes to rewrite any fraction of the form 1/n as a sum of unit fractions.

During the New Kingdom (c. 1550–1070 BC) mathematical problems are mentioned in the literary Papyrus Anastasi I, and the Papyrus Wilbour from the time of Ramesses III records land measurements. In the workers village of Deir el-Medina several ostraca have been found that record volumes of dirt removed while quarrying the tombs.

== Sources ==
Current understanding of ancient Egyptian mathematics is impeded by the paucity of available sources. The sources that do exist include the following texts (which are generally dated to the Middle Kingdom and Second Intermediate Period):

- The Moscow Mathematical Papyrus
- The Egyptian Mathematical Leather Roll
- The Lahun Mathematical Papyri
- The Berlin Papyrus 6619, written around 1800 BC
- The Akhmim Wooden Tablet
- The Reisner Papyrus, dated to the early Twelfth dynasty of Egypt and found in Nag el-Deir, the ancient town of Thinis
- The Rhind Mathematical Papyrus (RMP), dated from the Second Intermediate Period (c. 1650 BC), but its author, Ahmes, identifies it as a copy of a now lost Middle Kingdom papyrus. The RMP is the largest mathematical text.

From the New Kingdom there are a handful of mathematical texts and inscriptions related to computations:

- The Papyrus Anastasi I, a literary text written as a (fictional) letter written by a scribe named Hori and addressed to a scribe named Amenemope. A segment of the letter describes several mathematical problems.
- Ostracon Senmut 153, a text written in hieratic
- Ostracon Turin 57170, a text written in hieratic
- Ostraca from Deir el-Medina contain computations. Ostracon IFAO 1206 for instance shows the calculation of volumes, presumably related to the quarrying of a tomb.

== Numerals ==
Ancient Egyptian texts could be written in either hieroglyphs or in hieratic. In either representation the number system was always given in base 10. The number 1 was depicted by a simple stroke, the number 2 was represented by two strokes, etc. The numbers 10, 100, 1000, 10,000 and 100,000 had their own hieroglyphs. Number 10 is a hobble for cattle, number 100 is represented by a coiled rope, the number 1000 is represented by a lotus flower, the number 10,000 is represented by a finger, the number 100,000 is represented by a tadpole, and a million was represented by the god Heh with his hands raised in adoration.

Hieroglyphics for Egyptian numerals
1	10	100	1000	10,000	100,000	1,000,000
Z1	V20	V1	M12	D50	I8	C11

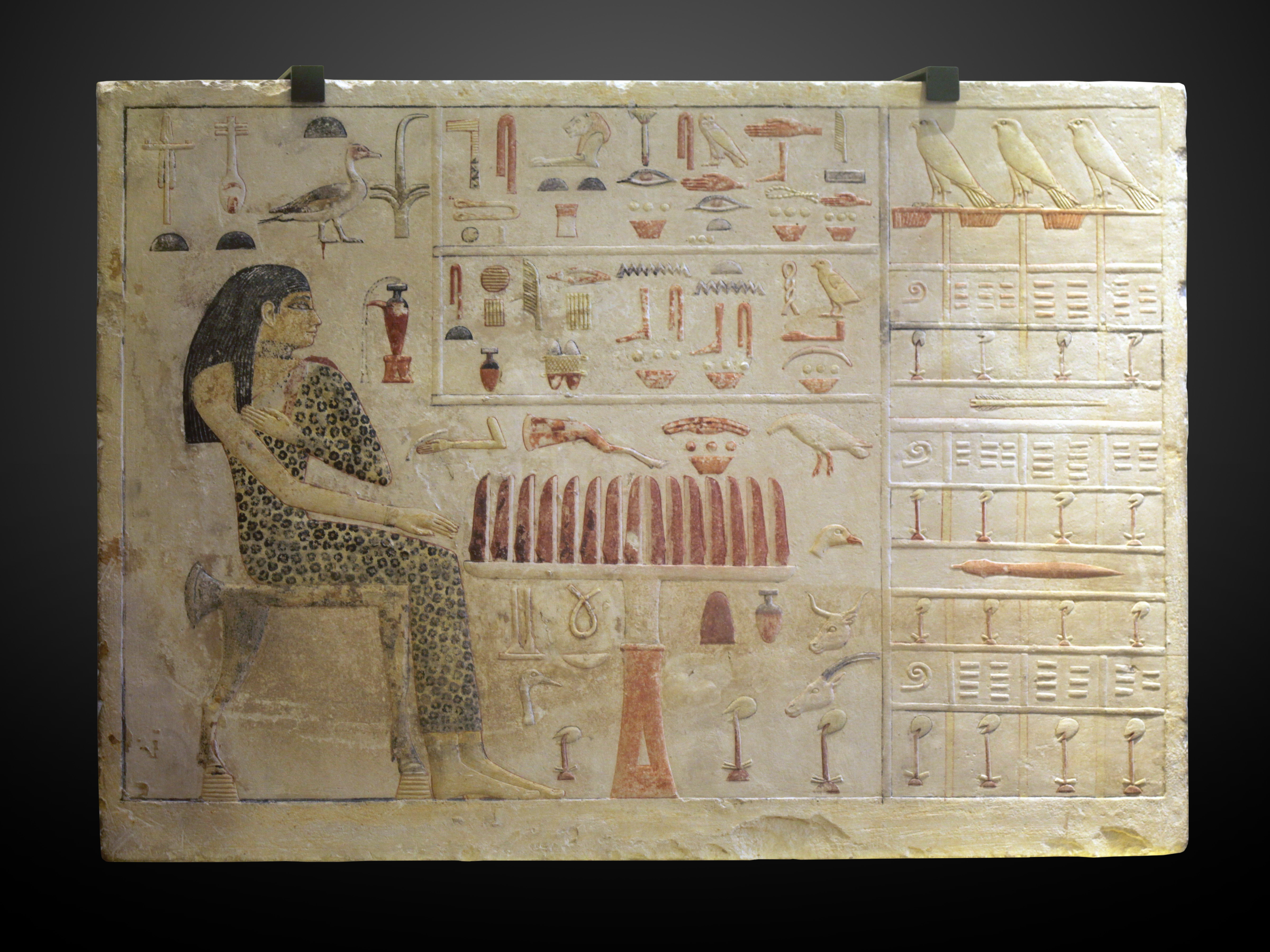
Slab stela of Old Kingdom princess Neferetiabet (dated 2590–2565 BC) from her tomb at Giza, painting on limestone, now in the Louvre

Egyptian numerals date back to the Predynastic period. Ivory labels from Abydos record the use of this number system. It is also common to see the numerals in offering scenes to indicate the number of items offered. The king's daughter Neferetiabet is shown with an offering of 1000 oxen, bread, beer, etc.

The Egyptian number system was additive. Large numbers were represented by collections of the glyphs and the value was obtained by simply adding the individual numbers together.

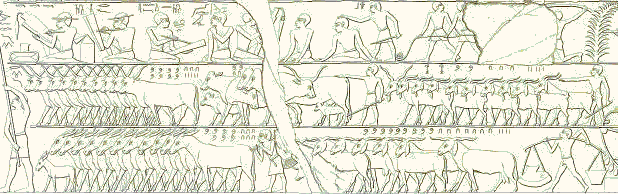
This scene depicts a cattle count (copied by the Egyptologist Lepsius). In the middle register we see 835 horned cattle on the left, right behind them are some 220 animals (cows?) and on the right 2235 goats. In the bottom register we see 760 donkeys on the left and 974 goats on the right.

The Egyptians almost exclusively used fractions of the form 1/n. One notable exception is the fraction 2/3, which is frequently found in the mathematical texts. Very rarely a special glyph was used to denote 3/4. The fraction 1/2 was represented by a glyph that may have depicted a piece of linen folded in two. The fraction 2/3 was represented by the glyph for a mouth with 2 (different sized) strokes. The rest of the fractions were always represented by a mouth super-imposed over a number.

Hieroglyphics for some fractions
1/2	1/3	2/3	1/4	1/5
Aa13	r Z2	D22	r Z1 Z1 Z1 Z1	r Z1 Z1 Z1 Z1 Z1

== Notation ==
Steps of calculations were written in sentences in Egyptian languages. (e.g. "Multiply 10 times 100; it becomes 1000.")

In Rhind Papyrus Problem 28, the hieroglyphs

D54 D55

(D54, D55), symbols for feet, were used to mean "to add" and "to subtract". These were presumably shorthands for

G35 D54 O1 D21 D54

meaning "to go in" and "to go out".

== Multiplication and division ==
Egyptian multiplication was done by a repeated doubling of the number to be multiplied (the multiplicand), and choosing which of the doublings to add together (essentially a form of binary arithmetic), a method that links to the Old Kingdom. The multiplicand was written next to figure 1; the multiplicand was then added to itself, and the result written next to the number 2. The process was continued until the doublings gave a number greater than half of the multiplier. Then the doubled numbers (1, 2, etc.) would be repeatedly subtracted from the multiplier to select which of the results of the existing calculations should be added together to create the answer.

As a shortcut for larger numbers, the multiplicand can also be immediately multiplied by 10, 100, 1000, 10000, etc.

For example, Problem 69 on the Rhind Papyrus (RMP) provides the following illustration, as if Hieroglyphic symbols were used (rather than the RMP's actual hieratic script).

Multiplication: 80 × 14
Egyptian calculation		Modern calculation	
Result	Multiplier	Result	Multiplier
V20 V20 V20 V20 V20 V20 V20 V20	Z1	80	1
V1 V1 V1 V1 V1 V1 V1 V1	V20	800	10
V20 V20 V20 V20 V20 V20 V1	Z1 Z1	160	2
V20 V20 V1 V1 V1	Z1 Z1 Z1 Z1	320	4
V20 V20 V1 M12	Z1 Z1 Z1 Z1 V20	1120	14

The denotes the intermediate results that are added together to produce the final answer.

The table above can also be used to divide 1120 by 80. We would solve this problem by finding the quotient (80) as the sum of those multipliers of 80 that add up to 1120. In this example that would yield a quotient of 10 + 4 = 14. A more complicated example of the division algorithm is provided by Problem 66. A total of 3200 ro of fat are to be distributed evenly over 365 days.

Division: 3200 ÷ 365
1	365
2	730
4	1460
8	2920
2/3	243 1/3
1/10	36 1/2
1/2190	1/6

First the scribe would double 365 repeatedly until the largest possible multiple of 365 is reached, which is smaller than 3200. In this case 8 times 365 is 2920 and further addition of multiples of 365 would clearly give a value greater than 3200. Next it is noted that 2/3 + 1/10 + 1/2190 times 365 gives us the value of 280 we need. Hence we find that 3200 divided by 365 must equal 8 + 2/3 + 1/10 + 1/2190.

== Algebra ==
Egyptian algebra problems appear in both the Rhind mathematical papyrus and the Moscow mathematical papyrus as well as several other sources.

P6 a M35
Aha
in hieroglyphs
Era: New Kingdom
(1550–1069 BC)

Aha problems involve finding unknown quantities (referred to as Aha) if the sum of the quantity and part(s) of it are given. The Rhind Mathematical Papyrus also contains four of these types of problems. Problems 1, 19, and 25 of the Moscow Papyrus are Aha problems. For instance problem 19 asks one to calculate a quantity taken 1 1/2 times and added to 4 to make 10. In other words, in modern mathematical notation we are asked to solve the linear equation:

$$\frac 3 2 \times x + 4 = 10.\$$

Solving these Aha problems involves a technique called method of false position. The technique is also called the method of false assumption. The scribe would substitute an initial guess of the answer into the problem. The solution using the false assumption would be proportional to the actual answer, and the scribe would find the answer by using this ratio.

The mathematical writings show that the scribes used (least) common multiples to turn problems with fractions into problems using integers. In this connection red auxiliary numbers are written next to the fractions.

The use of the Horus eye fractions shows some (rudimentary) knowledge of geometrical progression. Knowledge of arithmetic progressions is also evident from the mathematical sources.

=== Quadratic equations ===
The ancient Egyptians were the first civilization to develop and solve second-degree (quadratic) equations. This information is found in the Berlin Papyrus fragment. Additionally, the Egyptians solve first-degree algebraic equations found in Rhind Mathematical Papyrus.

== Geometry ==
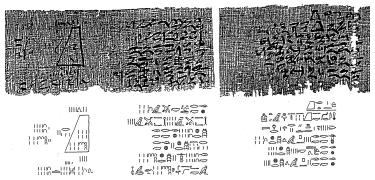
Image of Problem 14 from the Moscow Mathematical Papyrus. The problem includes a diagram indicating the dimensions of the truncated pyramid.

There are only a limited number of problems from ancient Egypt that concern geometry. Geometric problems appear in both the Moscow Mathematical Papyrus (MMP) and in the Rhind Mathematical Papyrus (RMP). The examples demonstrate that the Ancient Egyptians knew how to compute areas of several geometric shapes and the volumes of cylinders and pyramids.

- Area:
  - Triangles: The scribes record problems computing the area of a triangle (RMP and MMP).
  - Rectangles: Problems regarding the area of a rectangular plot of land appear in the RMP and the MMP. A similar problem appears in the Lahun Mathematical Papyri in London.
  - Circles: Problem 48 of the RMP compares the area of a circle (approximated by an octagon) and its circumscribing square. This problem's result is used in problem 50, where the scribe finds the area of a round field of diameter 9 khet.
  - Hemisphere: Problem 10 in the MMP finds the area of a hemisphere.
- Volumes:
  - Cylindrical (cylinder): Several problems compute the volume of cylindrical granaries (RMP 41–43), while problem 60 RMP seems to concern a pillar or a cone instead of a pyramid. It is rather small and steep, with a seked (reciprocal of slope) of four palms (per cubit). In section IV.3 of the Lahun Mathematical Papyri the volume of a granary with a circular base is found using the same procedure as RMP 43.
  - Rectangular (Cuboid): Several problems in the Moscow Mathematical Papyrus (problem 14) and in the Rhind Mathematical Papyrus (numbers 44, 45, 46) compute the volume of a rectangular granary.
  - Truncated pyramid (frustum) Frustum: The volume of a truncated pyramid is computed in MMP 14.

=== The Seqed ===
Problem 56 of the RMP indicates an understanding of the idea of geometric similarity. This problem discusses the ratio run/rise, also known as the seqed. Such a formula would be needed for building pyramids. In the next problem (Problem 57), the height of a pyramid is calculated from the base length and the seked (Egyptian for the reciprocal of the slope), while problem 58 gives the length of the base and the height and uses these measurements to compute the seqed. In Problem 59 part 1 computes the seqed, while the second part may be a computation to check the answer: If you construct a pyramid with base side 12 [cubits] and with a seqed of 5 palms 1 finger; what is its altitude?

== See also ==
- Red auxiliary number
- History of mathematics
  - History of geometry
- Egyptian hieroglyphics and Transliteration of Ancient Egyptian
- Ancient Egyptian units of measurement and technology
- Mathematics and architecture
