= Reisner Papyrus =

The Reisner Papyri date to the reign of Senusret I, who was king of ancient Egypt in the 19th century BCE. The documents were discovered by G.A. Reisner during excavations in 1901–04 in Naga ed-Deir in southern Egypt. A total of four papyrus rolls were found in a wooden coffin in a tomb.

- The Reisner I Papyrus is about 3.5 meters long and 31.6 cm wide in total. It consists of nine separate sheets and includes records of building construction with numbers of workers needed, carpentry workshops, dockyard workshops with lists of tools. Some segments contain calculations used in construction. The sections of the document were given letter designations by W.K. Simpson. Sections G, H, I, J and K contain records of the construction of a building, usually thought to be a temple. Section O is a record of worker's compensation. The records span 72 days of work.
- The Reisner II Papyrus: the Accounts of the Dockyard Workshop at This in the Reign of Sesostris I was published by W.K. Simpson in 1965. This papyrus contains accounts dating to years 15–18 of Senusret I. There are three administrative orders from a vizier.
- The Reisner III Papyrus: the Records of a Building Project in the Early Twelfth Dynasty was published by W. K. Simpson in 1969 for the Boston Museum of Fine Arts. Further research at this point indicated that the papyri may have come from a slightly earlier period.
- The Reisner IV Papyrus: the Personnel Accounts of the Early Twelfth Dynasty was published by W.K. Simpson in 1986.

== Mathematical texts ==
Several sections contain tables with mathematical content.

=== Papyrus Reisner I, Section G ===
Section G consistes of 19 lines of text. In the first line the column headings are given: length (3w), width (wsx), thickness or depth (mDwt), units, product/volume (sty), and in the last column the calculations of the number of workers needed for the work of that day.

=== Papyrus Reisner I, Section H ===
The format of the table in section H is similar to that of section G. In this document only the column heading product/volume is used however, and there is no column recording the number of workers required.

=== Papyrus Reisner I, Section I ===
Section I closely resembles section H. Columns recording the length, width, height and product/volume are presented. In this case there are no column headings written down by the scribe. The text is damaged in places but can be reconstructed. The units are cubits except where the scribe mentions palms. The square brackets indicate added or reconstructed text.

== Difficulties with interpretation ==
Gillings and other scholars accepted 100-year-old views of this document, with several of the views being incomplete and misleading. Two of the documents, reported in Tables 22.2 and 22.2, a detail a division by 10 method, a method that also appears in the Rhind Mathematical Papyrus. Labor efficiencies were monitored by applying this method. For example, how deep did 10 workmen dig in one day as calculated in the Reisner Papyrus, and by Ahmes 150 years later? In addition, the methods used in the Reisner and RMP to convert vulgar fractions to unit fraction series look similar to the conversion methods used in the Egyptian Mathematical Leather Roll.

Gillings repeated a common and incomplete view of the Reisner Papyrus. He analyzed lines G10, from table 22.3B, and line 17 from Table 22.2 on page 221, in the "Mathematics in the Time of the Pharaohs", citing these Reisner Papyrus facts: divide 39 by 10 = 4, a poor approximation to the correct value, reported Gillings.

Gillings fairly reported that the scribe should have stated the problem and data as:

39/10 = (30 + 9)/10 = 3 + 1/2 + 1/3 + 1/15

Yet, all other the division by 10 problems and answers were correctly stated, points that Gillings did not stress. Table 22.2 data described the work done in the Eastern Chapel. Additional raw data was listed on lines G5, G6/H32, G14, G15, G16, G17/H33 and G18/H34, as follows:

12/10 = 1 + 1/5 (G5)
10/10 = 1 (G6 & H32)
8/10 = 1/2 + 1/4 + 1/20 (G14)
48/10 = 4 + 1/2 + 1/4 + 1/20 (G15)
16/10 = 1 + 1/2 + 1/10 (G16)
64/10 = 6 + 1/4 + 1/10 + 1/20 (G17 & H33)
36/10 = 3 + 1/2 + 1/10 (G18 & H34)

Chace and Shute had noted the Reisner Papyrus division by 10 method, also applied in the RMP. Chace, nor Shute, clearly cite the quotients and remainders that were used by Ahmes. Other additive scholars have also muddled the reading the first 6 problems of the Rhind Mathematical Papyrus, missing its use of quotient and remainders.

Gillings, Chace and Shute apparently had not analyzed the RMP data in a broader context, and reported its older structure, thereby missing a major fragment of Akhmim Wooden Tablet and Reisner Papyrus remainder arithmetic. That is, Gillings' citation in the Reisner and RMP documented in the "Mathematics in the Time of the Pharaohs" only scratched the surface of scribal arithmetic. Had scholars dug a little deeper, academics may have found 80 years ago other reasons for the Reisner Papyrus 39/10 error.

The Reisner Papyrus error may have been noted by Gillings as using quotients (Q) and remainders (R). Ahmes used quotients and remainders in the RMP's first six problems. Gillings may have forgotten to summarize his findings in a rigorous manner, showing that several Middle Kingdom texts had used quotients and remainders.

Seen in a broader sense the Reisner Papyrus data should be noted as:

39/10 = (Q' + R)/10 with Q' = (Q*10), Q = 3 and R = 9

such that:

39/10 = 3 + 9/10 = 3 + 1/2 + 1/3 + 1/15

with 9/10 being converted to a unit fraction series following rules set down in the AWT, and followed in RMP and other texts.

Confirmation of the scribal remainder arithmetic is found in other hieratic texts. The most important text is the Akhmim Wooden Tablet. The AWT defines scribal remainder arithmetic in term of another context, a hekat (volume unit). Oddly, Gillings did not cite AWT data in "Mathematics in the Time of the Pharaohs". Gillings and the earlier 1920s scholars had missed a major opportunity to point out a multiple use of scribal remainder arithmetic built upon quotient and remainders.

The modern looking remainder arithmetic was later found by others by taking a broader view of the 39/10 error, as corrected as the actual Eastern Chapel data reports.

Gillings and the academic community therefore had inadvertently omitted a critically important discussion of fragments of remainder arithmetic. Remainder arithmetic, as used in many ancient cultures to solve astronomy and time problems, is one of several plausible historical division methods that may have allowed a full restoration of scribal division around 1906.

In summary, the Reisner Papyri was built upon a method described in the Akhmim Wooden Tablet, and later followed by Ahmes writing the RMP. The Reisner calculations apparently follows our modern Occam's Razor rule, that the simplest method was the historical method; in this case remainder arithmetic, such that:

n/10 = Q + R/10

where Q was a quotient and R was a remainder.

The Reisner, following this Occam's Razor rule, says that 10 workmen units were used to divide raw data using a method that was defined in the text, a method that also begins the Rhind Mathematical Papyrus, as noted in its first six problems.

== See also ==
- List of ancient Egyptian papyri
