= Imhausen =

Imhausen may refer to:

== Places ==
- Meinerzhagen, a German town in North Rhine-Westphalia with a division named Imhausen
- Windeck, a German town in North Rhine-Westphalia with a division named Imhausen

== People ==
- Annette Imhausen, German historian of ancient Egyptian mathematics

== Other ==
- Imhausen-Chemie, a West German chemical company implicated by Michael R. Gordon in Libyan chemical weapons production
- The Imhausen high-pressure process for coal liquefaction
