= Egyptian geometry =

Geometry emanating from Egypt

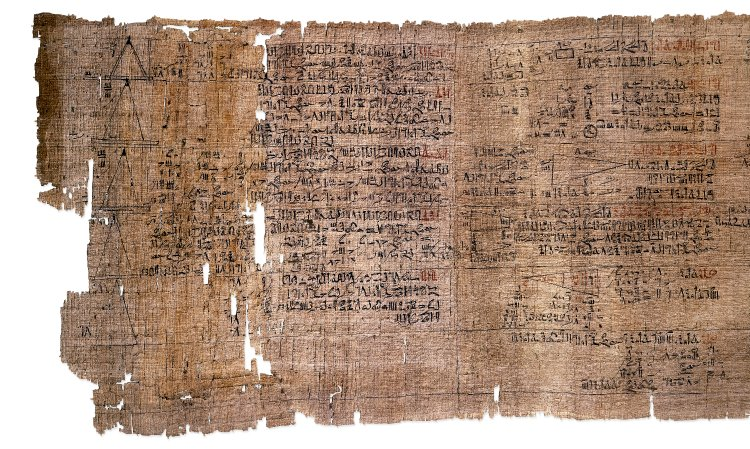
The Rhind Mathematical Papyrus

Egyptian geometry refers to geometry as it was developed and used in Ancient Egypt. Their geometry was a necessary outgrowth of surveying to preserve the layout and ownership of farmland, which was flooded annually by the Nile river.

We only have a limited number of problems from ancient Egypt that concern geometry. Geometric problems appear in both the Moscow Mathematical Papyrus (MMP) and in the Rhind Mathematical Papyrus (RMP). The examples demonstrate that the ancient Egyptians knew how to compute areas of several geometric shapes and the volumes of cylinders and pyramids.

== Area ==
The ancient Egyptians wrote out their problems in multiple parts. They gave the title and the data for the given problem, in some of the texts they would show how to solve the problem, and as the last step they verified that the problem was correct. The scribes did not use any variables and the problems were written in prose form. The solutions were written out in steps, outlining the process.

Egyptian circle

Egyptian units of length are attested from the Early Dynastic Period. Although it dates to the 5th dynasty, the Palermo stone recorded the level of the Nile River during the reign of the Early Dynastic pharaoh Djer, when the height of the Nile was recorded as 6 cubits and 1 palm (about 3.217 m or 10 ft 6.7 in). A Third Dynasty diagram shows how to construct a circular vault using body measures along an arc. If the area of the Square is 434 units. The area of the circle is 433.7.

The ostracon depicting this diagram was found near the Step Pyramid of Saqqara. A curve is divided into five sections and the height of the curve is given in cubits, palms, and digits in each of the sections.

At some point, lengths were standardized by cubit rods. Examples have been found in the tombs of officials, noting lengths up to remen. Royal cubits were used for land measures such as roads and fields. Fourteen rods, including one double-cubit rod, were described and compared by Lepsius. Two examples are known from the Saqqara tomb of Maya, the treasurer of Tutankhamun.

Another was found in the tomb of Kha (TT8) in Thebes. These cubits are 52.5 cm (20.7 in) long and are divided into palms and hands: each palm is divided into four fingers from left to right and the fingers are further subdivided into ro from right to left. The rulers are also divided into hands so that for example one foot is given as three hands and fifteen fingers and also as four palms and sixteen fingers.

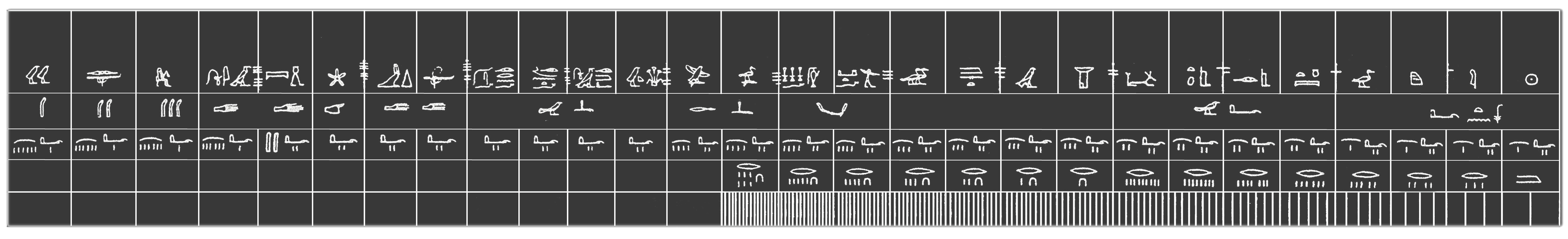
Cubit rod from the Turin Museum.

Surveying and itinerant measurement were undertaken using rods, poles, and knotted cords of rope. A scene in the tomb of Menna in Thebes shows surveyors measuring a plot of land using rope with knots tied at regular intervals. Similar scenes can be found in the tombs of Amenhotep-Sesi, Khaemhat and Djeserkareseneb. The balls of rope are also shown in New Kingdom statues of officials such as Senenmut, Amenemhet-Surer, and Penanhor.

Areas
Object	Source	Formula (using modern notation)
triangle	Problem 51 in RMP and problems 4, 7 and 17 in MMP	$A = \frac{1}{2} b h$ b = base, h = height
rectangles	Problem 49 in RMP and problems 6 in MMP and Lahun LV.4. problem 1	$A = b h$ b = base, h = height
circle	Problems 51 in RMP and problems 4, 7 and 17 in MMP	$A = \frac{1}{4} (\frac{256}{81}) d^2$ d= diameter. This uses the value 256/81 = 3.16049... for $\pi = 3.14159...$
hemisphere	Problem 10 in MMP

Triangles:
The ancient Egyptians knew that the area of a triangle is $A = \frac{1}{2} b h$ where b = base and h = height. Calculations of the area of a triangle appear in both the RMP and the MMP.

Rectangles:
Problem 49 from the RMP finds the area of a rectangular plot of land Problem 6 of MMP finds the lengths of the sides of a rectangular area given the ratio of the lengths of the sides. This problem seems to be identical to one of the Lahun Mathematical Papyri in London. The problem also demonstrates that the Egyptians were familiar with square roots. They even had a special hieroglyph for finding a square root. It looks like a corner and appears in the fifth line of the problem. Scholars suspect that they had tables giving the square roots of some often used numbers. No such tables have been found however. Problem 18 of the MMP computes the area of a length of garment-cloth.

The Lahun Papyrus Problem 1 in LV.4 is given as: An area of 40 "mH" by 3 "mH" shall be divided in 10 areas, each of which shall have a width that is 1/2 1/4 of their length. A translation of the problem and its solution as it appears on the fragment is given on the website maintained by University College London.

Circles:
Problem 48 of the RMP compares the area of a circle (approximated by an octagon) and its circumscribing square. This problem's result is used in problem 50.

Trisect each side. Remove the corner triangles. The resulting octagonal figure approximates the circle. The area of the octagonal figure is:

$9^2 -4 \frac{1}{2} (3) (3) = 63$ Next we approximate 63 to be 64 and note that $64=8^2$

Thus the number $4(\frac{8}{9})^2 = 3.16049...$ plays the role of π = 3.14159....

That this octagonal figure, whose area is easily calculated, so accurately approximates the area of the circle is just plain good luck. Obtaining a better approximation to the area using finer divisions of a square and a similar argument is not simple.

Problem 50 of the RMP finds the area of a round field of diameter 9 khet. This is solved by using the approximation that circular field of diameter 9 has the same area as a square of side 8. Problem 52 finds the area of a trapezium with (apparently) equally slanting sides. The lengths of the parallel sides and the distance between them being the given numbers.

Hemisphere:
Problem 10 of the MMP computes the area of a hemisphere.

== Volumes ==
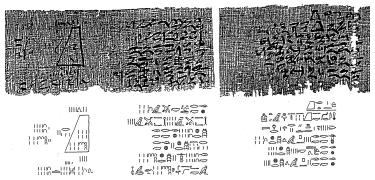
Image of Problem 14 from the Moscow Mathematical Papyrus. The problem includes a diagram indicating the dimensions of the truncated pyramid.

Several problems compute the volume of cylindrical granaries (41, 42, and 43 of the RMP), while problem 60 RMP seems to concern a pillar or a cone instead of a pyramid. It is rather small and steep, with a seked (slope) of four palms (per cubit).

A problem appearing in section IV.3 of the Lahun Mathematical Papyri computes the volume of a granary with a circular base. A similar problem and procedure can be found in the Rhind papyrus (problem 43). Several problems in the Moscow Mathematical Papyrus (problem 14) and in the Rhind Mathematical Papyrus (numbers 44, 45, 46) compute the volume of a rectangular granary.

Problem 14 of the Moscow Mathematical Papyrus computes the volume of a truncated pyramid, also known as a frustum.

Volumes
Object	Source	Formula (using modern notation)
Cylindrical granaries	RMP 41	$V = \frac{256}{81} r^2\ h$ measured in cubic-cubits
Cylindrical granaries	RMP 42, Lahun IV.3	$V = \frac{32}{27} d^2\ h = \frac{128}{27} r^2\ h$ (measured in khar).
Rectangular granaries	RMP 44-46 and MMP 14	$V = w \ l \ h$ w = width, l = length, h = height
Truncated pyramid (frustum)	MMP 14	$V = \frac{1}{3} (a^2 + ab + b^2) h$

== Seked ==
Problem 56 of the RMP indicates an understanding of the idea of geometric similarity. This problem discusses the ratio run/rise, also known as the seked. Such a formula would be needed for building pyramids. In the next problem (Problem 57), the height of a pyramid is calculated from the base length and the seked (Egyptian for slope), while problem 58 gives the length of the base and the height and uses these measurements to compute the seked.

In Problem 59 part 1 computes the seked, while the second part may be a computation to check the answer: If you construct a pyramid with base side 12 [cubits] and with a seked of 5 palms 1 finger; what is its altitude?

== Bibliography ==
- Clagett, Marshall (1999). Ancient Egyptian Science: A Source Book, Vol. III: Ancient Egyptian Mathematics. Memoirs of the APS, Vol. 232. Philadelphia: American Philosophical Society. ISBN 978-0-87169-232-0.
- Lepsius, Karl Richard (1865). Die Alt-Aegyptische Elle und Ihre Eintheilung (in German). Berlin: Dümmler.
