= Egyptian Mathematical Leather Roll =

Ancient Egyptian text

Egyptian Mathematical Leather Roll (EMLR)
- British Museum in London
- Date: ca 1650 BCE
- Place of origin: Thebes
- Language: Hieratic
- Size: Length: 10 inches (25 cm); Width: 17 inches (43 cm)

The Egyptian Mathematical Leather Roll (EMLR) is a 10 × 17 in (25 × 43 cm) leather roll purchased by Alexander Henry Rhind in 1858. It was sent to the British Museum in 1864, along with the Rhind Mathematical Papyrus, but it was not chemically softened and unrolled until 1927 (Scott, Hall 1927).

The writing consists of Middle Kingdom hieratic characters written right to left. Scholars date the EMLR to the 17th century BCE.

== Mathematical content ==
This leather roll is an aid for computing Egyptian fractions. It contains 26 sums of unit fractions which equal another unit fraction. The sums appear in two columns, and are followed by two more columns which contain exactly the same sums.

The Egyptian Mathematical Leather Roll
Column 1	Column 2	Column 3	Column 4
$\frac{1}{10} + \frac{1}{40} = \frac{1}{8}$	$\frac{1}{30} + \frac{1}{45} + \frac{1}{90}= \frac{1}{15}$	$\frac{1}{10} + \frac{1}{40} = \frac{1}{8}$	$\frac{1}{18} + \frac{1}{36} = \frac{1}{12}$
$\frac{1}{5} + \frac{1}{20} = \frac{1}{4}$	$\frac{1}{24} + \frac{1}{48} = \frac{1}{16}$	$\frac{1}{5} + \frac{1}{20} = \frac{1}{4}$	$\frac{1}{21} + \frac{1}{42} = \frac{1}{14}$
$\frac{1}{4} + \frac{1}{12} = \frac{1}{3}$	$\frac{1}{18} + \frac{1}{36} = \frac{1}{12}$	$\frac{1}{4} + \frac{1}{12} = \frac{1}{3}$	$\frac{1}{45} + \frac{1}{90} = \frac{1}{30}$
$\frac{1}{10} + \frac{1}{10} = \frac{1}{5}$	$\frac{1}{21} + \frac{1}{42} = \frac{1}{14}$	$\frac{1}{10} + \frac{1}{10} = \frac{1}{5}$	$\frac{1}{30} + \frac{1}{60} = \frac{1}{20}$
$\frac{1}{6} + \frac{1}{6} = \frac{1}{3}$	$\frac{1}{45} + \frac{1}{90} = \frac{1}{30}$	$\frac{1}{6} + \frac{1}{6} = \frac{1}{3}$	$\frac{1}{15} + \frac{1}{30} = \frac{1}{10}$
$\frac{1}{6} + \frac{1}{6} + \frac{1}{6} = \frac{1}{2}$	$\frac{1}{30} + \frac{1}{60} = \frac{1}{20}$	$\frac{1}{6} + \frac{1}{6} + \frac{1}{6} = \frac{1}{2}$	$\frac{1}{48} + \frac{1}{96} = \frac{1}{32}$
$\frac{1}{3} + \frac{1}{3} = \frac{2}{3}$	$\frac{1}{15} + \frac{1}{30} = \frac{1}{10}$	$\frac{1}{3} + \frac{1}{3} = \frac{2}{3}$	$\frac{1}{96} + \frac{1}{192} = \frac{1}{64}$
$\frac{1}{25} + \frac{1}{15} + \frac{1}{75} + \frac{1}{200} = \frac{1}{8}$	$\frac{1}{48} + \frac{1}{96} = \frac{1}{32}$	$\frac{1}{25} + \frac{1}{15} + \frac{1}{75} + \frac{1}{200} = \frac{1}{8}$	
$\frac{1}{50} + \frac{1}{30} + \frac{1}{150} + \frac{1}{400} = \frac{1}{16}$	$\frac{1}{96} + \frac{1}{192} = \frac{1}{64}$	$\frac{1}{50} + \frac{1}{30} + \frac{1}{150} + \frac{1}{400} = \frac{1}{16}$	
$\frac{1}{25} + \frac{1}{50} + \frac{1}{150} = \frac{1}{15}$		$\frac{1}{25} + \frac{1}{50} + \frac{1}{150} = \frac{1}{6}$	
$\frac{1}{9} + \frac{1}{18} = \frac{1}{6}$		$\frac{1}{9} + \frac{1}{18} = \frac{1}{6}$	
$\frac{1}{7} + \frac{1}{14} + \frac{1}{28} = \frac{1}{4}$		$\frac{1}{7} + \frac{1}{14} + \frac{1}{28} = \frac{1}{4}$	
$\frac{1}{12} + \frac{1}{24} = \frac{1}{8}$		$\frac{1}{12} + \frac{1}{24} = \frac{1}{8}$	
$\frac{1}{14} + \frac{1}{21} + \frac{1}{42} = \frac{1}{7}$		$\frac{1}{14} + \frac{1}{21} + \frac{1}{42} = \frac{1}{7}$	
$\frac{1}{18} + \frac{1}{27} + \frac{1}{54} = \frac{1}{9}$		$\frac{1}{18} + \frac{1}{27} + \frac{1}{54} = \frac{1}{9}$	
$\frac{1}{22} + \frac{1}{33} + \frac{1}{66} = \frac{1}{11}$		$\frac{1}{22} + \frac{1}{33} + \frac{1}{66} = \frac{1}{11}$	
$\frac{1}{28} + \frac{1}{49} + \frac{1}{196} = \frac{1}{13}$		$\frac{1}{28} + \frac{1}{49} + \frac{1}{196} = \frac{1}{13}$	
		$\frac{1}{30} + \frac{1}{45} + \frac{1}{90} = \frac{1}{15}$	
		$\frac{1}{24} + \frac{1}{48} = \frac{1}{16}$	

Of the 26 sums listed, ten are Eye of Horus numbers: 1/2, 1/4 (twice), 1/8 (thrice), 1/16 (twice), 1/32, 1/64 converted from Egyptian fractions. There are seven other sums having even denominators converted from Egyptian fractions: 1/6 (listed twice–but wrong once), 1/10, 1/12, 1/14, 1/20 and 1/30. By way of example, the three 1/8 conversions followed one or two scaling factors as alternatives:

1. 1/8 x 3/3 = 3/24 = (2 + 1)/24 = 1/12 + 1/24

2. 1/8 x 5/5 = 5/40 = (4 + 1)/40 = 1/10 + 1/40

3. 1/8 x 25/25 = 25/200 = (8 + 17)/200 = 1/25 + (17/200 x 6/6) = 1/25 + 102/1200 = 1/25 + (80 + 16 + 6)/1200 = 1/25 + 1/15 + 1/75 + 1/200

Finally, there were nine sums, having odd denominators, converted from Egyptian fractions: 2/3, 1/3 (twice), 1/5, 1/7, 1/9, 1/11, 1/13 and 1/15.

The British Museum examiners found no introduction or description to how or why the equivalent unit fraction series were computed. Equivalent unit fraction series are associated with fractions 1/3, 1/4, 1/8 and 1/16. There was a trivial error associated with the final 1/15 unit fraction series. The 1/15 series was listed as equal to 1/6. Another serious error was associated with 1/13, an issue that the examiners of 1927 did not attempt to resolve.

== Modern analysis ==
The original mathematical texts never explain where the procedures and formulas came from. This holds true for the EMLR as well. Scholars have attempted to deduce what techniques the ancient Egyptians may have used to construct both the unit fraction tables of the EMLR and the 2/n tables known from the Rhind Mathematical Papyrus and the Lahun Mathematical Papyri. Both types of tables were used to aid in computations dealing with fractions, and for the conversion of measuring units.

It has been noted that there are groups of unit fraction decompositions in the EMLR which are very similar. For instance lines 5 and 6 easily combine into the equation 1/3 + 1/6 = 1/2. It is easy to derive lines 11, 13, 24, 20, 21, 19, 23, 22, 25 and 26 by dividing this equation by 3, 4, 5, 6, 7, 8, 10, 15, 16 and 32 respectively.

Some of the problems would lend themselves to a solution via an algorithm which involves multiplying both the numerator and the denominator by the same term and then further reducing the resulting equation:

$$\frac{1}{pq} = \frac{1}{N}\times\frac{N}{pq}$$

This method leads to a solution for the fraction 1/8 as appears in the EMLR when using N=25 (using modern mathematical notation):

$$\begin{align}
1/8 &= 1/25 \times 25/8 = 1/5 \times 25/40 = 1/5 \times (3/5 + 1/40) \\
&= 1/5 \times (1/5 + 2/5 + 1/40) = 1/5 \times (1/5 + 1/3 + 1/15 + 1/40) \\
&= 1/25 + 1/15 + 1/75 + 1/200
\end{align}$$

== Modern conclusions ==
The EMLR has been considered a student scribe test document since 1927, the year that the text was unrolled at the British Museum. The scribe practiced conversions of rational numbers 1/p and 1/pq to alternative unit fraction series. Reading available Middle Kingdom math records, RMP 2/n table being one, modern students of Egyptian arithmetic may see that trained scribes improved conversions of 2/n and n/p to concise unit fraction series by applying algorithmic and non-algorithmic methods.

== Chronology ==
The following chronology shows several milestones that marked the recent progress toward reporting a clearer understanding of the EMLR's contents, related to the RMP 2/n table.

- 1895 – Hultsch suggested that all RMP 2/p series were coded by aliquot parts.
- 1927 – Glanville concluded that EMLR arithmetic was purely additive.
- 1929 – Vogel reported the EMLR to be more important (than the RMP), though it contains only 25 unit fraction series.
- 1950 – Bruins independently confirms Hultsch's RMP 2/p analysis (Bruins 1950)
- 1972 – Gillings found solutions to an easier RMP problem, the 2/pq series (Gillings 1972: 95–96).
- 1982 – Knorr identifies RMP unit fractions 2/35, 2/91 and 2/95 as exceptions to the 2/pq problem.
- 2002 – Gardner identifies five abstract EMLR patterns.
- 2018 – Dorce explains the pattern of RMP 2/p.

== See also ==
Egyptian mathematical texts:

- Akhmim Wooden Tablet
- Berlin Papyrus 6619
- Lahun Mathematical Papyri
- Moscow Mathematical Papyrus
- Reisner Papyrus

Other:

- Liber Abaci
- Sylvia Couchoud (in French)
