= Alexander Henry Rhind =

Scottish antiquarian and archaeologist

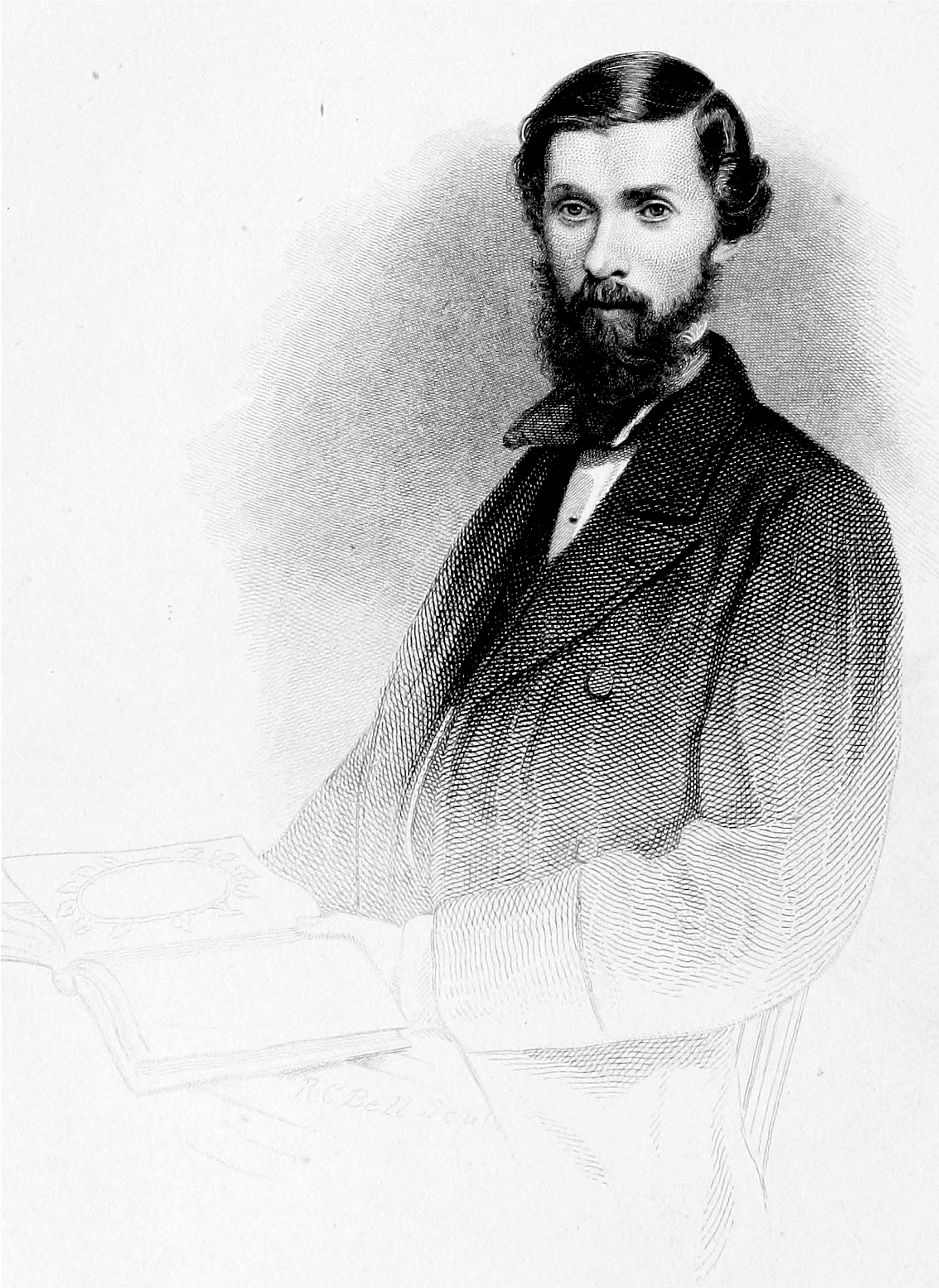
Engraving from photo in Stuart's Memoir by Robert C. Bell

Alexander Henry Rhind (/raɪnd/; 26 July 1833 – 3 July 1863) was a Scottish antiquarian and archaeologist.

== Biography ==
Born on 26 July 1833 in Wick in the Scottish Highlands, Rhind studied at the University of Edinburgh. He has often been erroneously referred to as a lawyer, but he never actually studied law. Rhind excavated and published a number of prehistoric sites in northern Scotland in the early 1850s, and donated the finds to the Society of Antiquaries of Scotland (now in National Museums Scotland). Suffering from pulmonary disease, he travelled to Egypt in the winters of 1855–1857 with the intention of excavating and collecting for the newly formed National Museum of Antiquities of Scotland.

He collected material for his book entitled Thebes, its Tombs and their Tenants, which was published in 1862. He was a prolific writer with a methodical research style, despite continuing to battle ill health.

Among the items that he collected was the Rhind Papyrus, also known as the Ahmes Papyrus after its Egyptian scribe. Rhind acquired it around 1858, and following his death shortly afterwards, it was sold to the British Museum, along with the similar Egyptian Mathematical Leather Roll. Both are mathematical treatises and both were purchased in the Luxor market, and may have previously been stolen from the Ramesseum. When chemically softened and decoded years afterward, they show the Egyptians had computed the value of π as 3.1605, a margin of error of less than one percent.

He has been described as a "young hero", the only "bright shining light of archaeological method and conscience" in the mid-nineteenth century, who plotted the exact location of artefacts and their relationships, the first to do so.

Rhind died in his sleep at the age of 29, on 3 July 1863 in Cadenabbia. Along with his 1600-volume library he left a bequest to the Society of Antiquaries of Scotland to fund a lectureship, and the prestigious Rhind Lectures currently hosted by the Society commemorates his name. Rhind directed that a sum from his estate at Sibster, Caithness, be used for this purpose, once the interests of living parties was extinguished; this eventuated in 1874, 11 years after his death.

== Publications ==
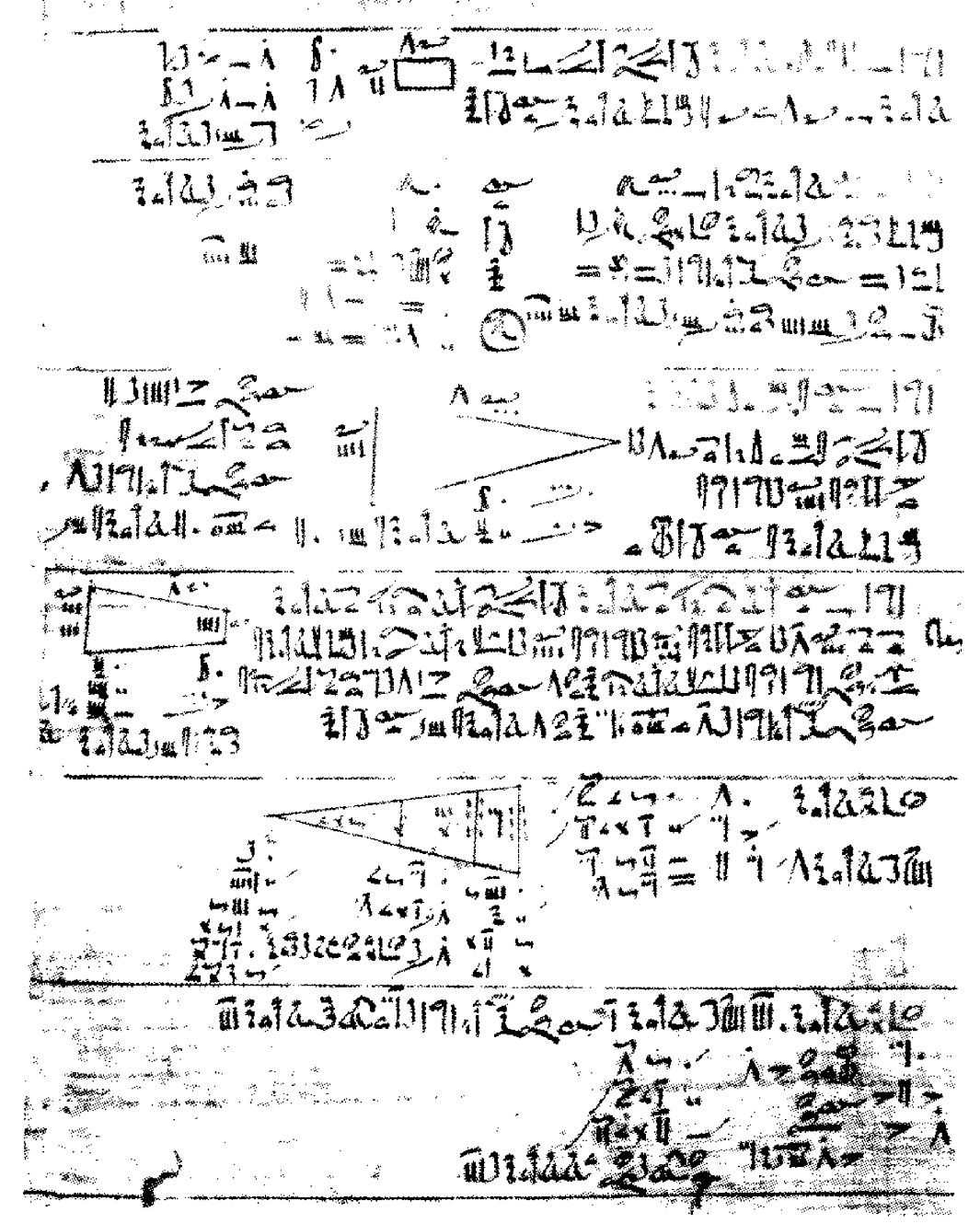
Rhind Mathematical Papyrus

- British Archæology, its progress and demands
- Facsimiles of two papyri found in a tomb at Thebes with a translation by Samuel Birch and an account of their discovery
- Law of treasure-trove: how can it be best adapted to accomplish useful results?
- Thebes: its tombs and their tenants, ancient and present
