= Annette Imhausen =

German mathematician, archaeologist, historian of mathematics and egyptologist

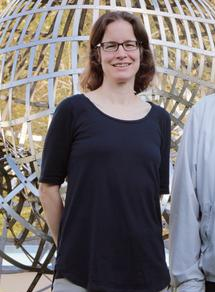
Imhausen at Oberwolfach, 2017

Annette Imhausen (also known as Annette Warner, born 12 June 1970) is a German historian of mathematics known for her work on Ancient Egyptian mathematics. She is a professor in the Normative Orders Cluster of Excellence at Goethe University Frankfurt.

== Education and career ==
Imhausen studied mathematics, chemistry, and Egyptology at Johannes Gutenberg University Mainz, passing the Staatsexamen in 1996. She then continued her studies in Egyptology and Assyriology at the Freie Universität Berlin. In 2002, She completed her doctorate in the history of mathematics at Mainz under the joint supervision of David E. Rowe and James Ritter.

She held a fellowship at the Dibner Institute for the History of Science and Technology (Cambridge, MA) before she received a Junior Research Fellowship at the University of Cambridge from 2003 to 2006. She returned to Mainz as an assistant professor from 2006 to 2008, and became a professor at Frankfurt in 2009.

== Contributions ==
Imhausen is featured in the BBC TV series The Story of Maths.

Her dissertation, Ägyptische Algorithmen. Eine Untersuchung zu den mittelägyptischen mathematischen Aufgabentexten, was published by Harrassowitz Verlag in 2002 (Ägyptologische Abhandlungen, vol. 65). She is also the author of Mathematics in Ancient Egypt: A Contextual History (Princeton University Press, 2016).
