= Lahun Mathematical Papyri =

Mathematical subset of the Lahun Papyri

The Lahun Mathematical Papyri (also known as the Kahun Mathematical Papyri) is an ancient Egyptian mathematical text. It forms part of the Kahun Papyri, which was discovered at El-Lahun (also known as Lahun, Kahun or Il-Lahun) by Flinders Petrie during excavations of a workers' town near the pyramid of the Twelfth Dynasty pharaoh Sesostris II. The Kahun Papyri are a collection of texts including administrative texts, medical texts, veterinarian texts and six fragments devoted to mathematics.

== Fragments ==
The mathematical texts most commented on are usually named:

- Lahun IV.2 (or Kahun IV.2) (UC 32159): This fragment contains a table of Egyptian fraction representations of numbers of the form 2/n. A more complete version of this table of fractions is given in the Rhind Mathematical Papyrus.
- Lahun IV.3 (or Kahun IV.3) (UC 32160) contains numbers in arithmetical progression and a problem very similar to Problem 40 of the Rhind Mathematical Papyrus. Another problem on this fragment computes the volume of a cylindrical granary. In this problem the scribe uses a formula which takes measurements in cubits and computes the volume and expresses it in terms of the unit khar. Given the diameter (d) and height (h) of the cylindrical granary. As was common for ancient Egyptian mathematics, the scribe did not necessarily generalize the result for arbitrary values of the diameter (d) and height (h). Instead, results were typically obtained empirically —even in problems that involved equations, often solved through the Regula falsi method— rather than through formalized geometric reasoning. In this particular case, the scribe presented the calculation for d = 12 and h = 8.

$$V = ((1+1/3)d)^2 \, ((2/3) h)$$.

In modern mathematical notation this is equal to

$V = \frac{32}{27} d^2 h = \frac{128}{27} r^2 h$ (measured in khar).

This problem resembles problem 42 of the Rhind Mathematical Papyrus. The formula is equivalent to $V = \frac{256}{81} r^2 h$ measured in cubic-cubits as used in the other problems.

- Lahun XLV.1 (or Kahun XLV.1) (UC 32161) contains a group of very large numbers (hundreds of thousands).
- Lahun LV.3 (or Kahun LV.3) (UC 32134A and UC 32134B) contains a so-called aha problem which asks one to solve for a certain quantity. The problem resembles ones from the Rhind Mathematical Papyrus (problems 24–29).
- Lahun LV.4 (or Kahun LV.4) (UC 32162) contains what seems to be an area computation and a problem concerning the value of ducks, geese and cranes. The problem concerning fowl is a baku problem and most closely resembles problem 69 in the Rhind Mathematical Papyrus and problems 11 and 21 in the Moscow Mathematical Papyrus.
- Unnamed fragment (UC 32118B). This is a fragmentary piece.

== 2/n tables ==
The Lahun papyrus IV.2 reports a 2/n table for odd n, n = 1, ..., 21. The Rhind Mathematical Papyrus reports an odd n table up to 101. These fraction tables were related to multiplication problems and the use of unit fractions, namely n/p scaled by LCM m to mn/mp. With the exception of 2/3, all fractions were represented as sums of unit fractions (i.e. of the form 1/n), first in red numbers. Multiplication algorithms and scaling factors involved repeated doubling of numbers, and other operations. Doubling a unit fraction with an even denominator was simple, dividing the denominator by 2. Doubling a fraction with an odd denominator however results in a fraction of the form 2/n. The RMP 2/n table and RMP 36 rules allowed scribes to find decompositions of 2/n into unit fractions for specific needs, most often to solve otherwise un-scalable rational numbers (i.e. 28/97 in RMP 31, and 30/53 n RMP 36 by substituting 26/97 + 2/97 and 28/53 + 2/53) and generally n/p by (n − 2)/p + 2/p. Decompositions were unique. Red auxiliary numbers selected divisors of denominators mp that best summed to numerator mn.

== See also ==
- List of ancient Egyptian papyri
