= Rhind Mathematical Papyrus 2/n table =

Mathematical table

The Rhind Mathematical Papyrus, an ancient Egyptian mathematical work, includes a mathematical table for converting rational numbers of the form 2/n into Egyptian fractions (sums of distinct unit fractions), the form the Egyptians used to write fractional numbers. The text describes the representation of 50 rational numbers. It was written during the Second Intermediate Period of Egypt (approximately 1650–1550 BCE) by Ahmes, the first writer of mathematics whose name is known. Aspects of the document may have been copied from an unknown 1850 BCE text.

== Table ==
The following table gives the expansions listed in the papyrus.

2/n table from the Rhind Mathematical Papyrus
| 2/3 = 1/2 + 1/6 | 2/5 = 1/3 + 1/15 | 2/7 = 1/4 + 1/28 |
| 2/9 = 1/6 + 1/18 | 2/11 = 1/6 + 1/66 | 2/13 = 1/8 + 1/52 + 1/104 |
| 2/15 = 1/10 + 1/30 | 2/17 = 1/12 + 1/51 + 1/68 | 2/19 = 1/12 + 1/76 + 1/114 |
| 2/21 = 1/14 + 1/42 | 2/23 = 1/12 + 1/276 | 2/25 = 1/15 + 1/75 |
| 2/27 = 1/18 + 1/54 | 2/29 = 1/24 + 1/58 + 1/174 + 1/232 | 2/31 = 1/20 + 1/124 + 1/155 |
| 2/33 = 1/22 + 1/66 | 2/35 = 1/30 + 1/42 | 2/37 = 1/24 + 1/111 + 1/296 |
| 2/39 = 1/26 + 1/78 | 2/41 = 1/24 + 1/246 + 1/328 | 2/43 = 1/42 + 1/86 + 1/129 + 1/301 |
| 2/45 = 1/30 + 1/90 | 2/47 = 1/30 + 1/141 + 1/470 | 2/49 = 1/28 + 1/196 |
| 2/51 = 1/34 + 1/102 | 2/53 = 1/30 + 1/318 + 1/795 | 2/55 = 1/30 + 1/330 |
| 2/57 = 1/38 + 1/114 | 2/59 = 1/36 + 1/236 + 1/531 | 2/61 = 1/40 + 1/244 + 1/488 + 1/610 |
| 2/63 = 1/42 + 1/126 | 2/65 = 1/39 + 1/195 | 2/67 = 1/40 + 1/335 + 1/536 |
| 2/69 = 1/46 + 1/138 | 2/71 = 1/40 + 1/568 + 1/710 | 2/73 = 1/60 + 1/219 + 1/292 + 1/365 |
| 2/75 = 1/50 + 1/150 | 2/77 = 1/44 + 1/308 | 2/79 = 1/60 + 1/237 + 1/316 + 1/790 |
| 2/81 = 1/54 + 1/162 | 2/83 = 1/60 + 1/332 + 1/415 + 1/498 | 2/85 = 1/51 + 1/255 |
| 2/87 = 1/58 + 1/174 | 2/89 = 1/60 + 1/356 + 1/534 + 1/890 | 2/91 = 1/70 + 1/130 |
| 2/93 = 1/62 + 1/186 | 2/95 = 1/60 + 1/380 + 1/570 | 2/97 = 1/56 + 1/679 + 1/776 |
| 2/99 = 1/66 + 1/198 | 2/101 = 1/101 + 1/202 + 1/303 + 1/606 | |

This part of the Rhind Mathematical Papyrus was spread over nine sheets of papyrus.

== Explanations ==
Any rational number has infinitely many different possible expansions as a sum of unit fractions, and since the discovery of the Rhind Mathematical Papyrus mathematicians have struggled to understand how the ancient Egyptians might have calculated the specific expansions shown in this table.

Suggestions by Gillings included five different techniques. Problem 61 in the Rhind Mathematical Papyrus gives one formula:

$\frac{2}{3n} = \frac{1}{2n} + \frac{1}{6n}$, which can be stated equivalently as $\frac{2}{n} = \frac{1}{2} \frac{1}{n} +\frac{3}{2} \frac{1}{n}$ (n divisible by 3 in the latter equation).

Other possible formulas are:

$\,\frac{2}{n}\; = \;\frac{1}{3} \frac{1}{n} +\frac{5}{3} \frac{1}{n}$ (n divisible by 5)

$\!\frac{2}{mn}\! = \frac{1}{m}\!\frac{1}{k} +\frac{1}{n} \frac{1}{k}$ (where k is the average of m and n)

$\,\frac{2}{n}\; = \,\frac{1}{n} + \frac{1}{2n} + \frac{1}{3n} + \frac{1}{6n}$. This formula yields the decomposition for n = 101 in the table.

Ahmes was suggested to have converted 2/p (where p was a prime number) by two methods, and three methods to convert 2/pq composite denominators. Others have suggested only one method was used by Ahmes which used multiplicative factors similar to least common multiples. A detailed and simple explanation of how the 2/p table may have been decomposed was provided by Abdulrahman Abdulaziz.

== Comparison to other table texts ==
An older ancient Egyptian papyrus contained a similar table of Egyptian fractions; the Lahun Mathematical Papyri, written around 1850 BCE, is about the age of one unknown source for the Rhind papyrus. The Lahun 2/n fractions were identical to the fraction decompositions given in the Rhind Papyrus' 2/n table.

The Egyptian Mathematical Leather Roll (EMLR), circa 1900 BCE, lists decompositions of fractions of the form 1/n into other unit fractions. The table consisted of 26 unit fraction series of the form 1/n written as sums of other rational numbers.

The Akhmim wooden tablet wrote difficult fractions of the form 1/n (specifically, 1/3, 1/7, 1/10, 1/11 and 1/13) in terms of Eye of Horus fractions which were fractions of the form 1/2^{k} and remainders expressed in terms of a unit called ro. The answers were checked by multiplying the initial divisor by the proposed solution and checking that the resulting answer was 1/2 + 1/4 + 1/8 + 1/16 + 1/32 + 1/64 + 5 ro, which equals 1.
