= Ipi (vizier) =

Ancient Egyptian vizier

- Vizier of Egypt
Egyptian name
M17 Q3 M17
- Pharaoh: Amenemhat I
- Burial: Deir el-Bahari, Luxor, Egypt

Ipi was an Ancient Egyptian vizier of the early Middle Kingdom.

== Biography ==
His only secure attestation known today is his Theban Tomb (TT315) (MMA 516). The tomb was found in the rocks of Deir el-Bahari overlooking the funerary complex of Mentuhotep II. It consisted of a great courtyard, a corridor, a chapel and a burial chamber. The corridor and chapel were found undecorated and only the burial chamber had painted decorations, religious texts and the titles and name of Ipi on its walls. The burial chamber housed a sarcophagus, sunk into the floor.

The courtyard in front of Ipi's tomb comprised the burial of the servant Meseh, where the Heqanakht papyri were discovered. In another chamber were found about sixty vessels and an embalming table, presumably for the mummy of Ipi.

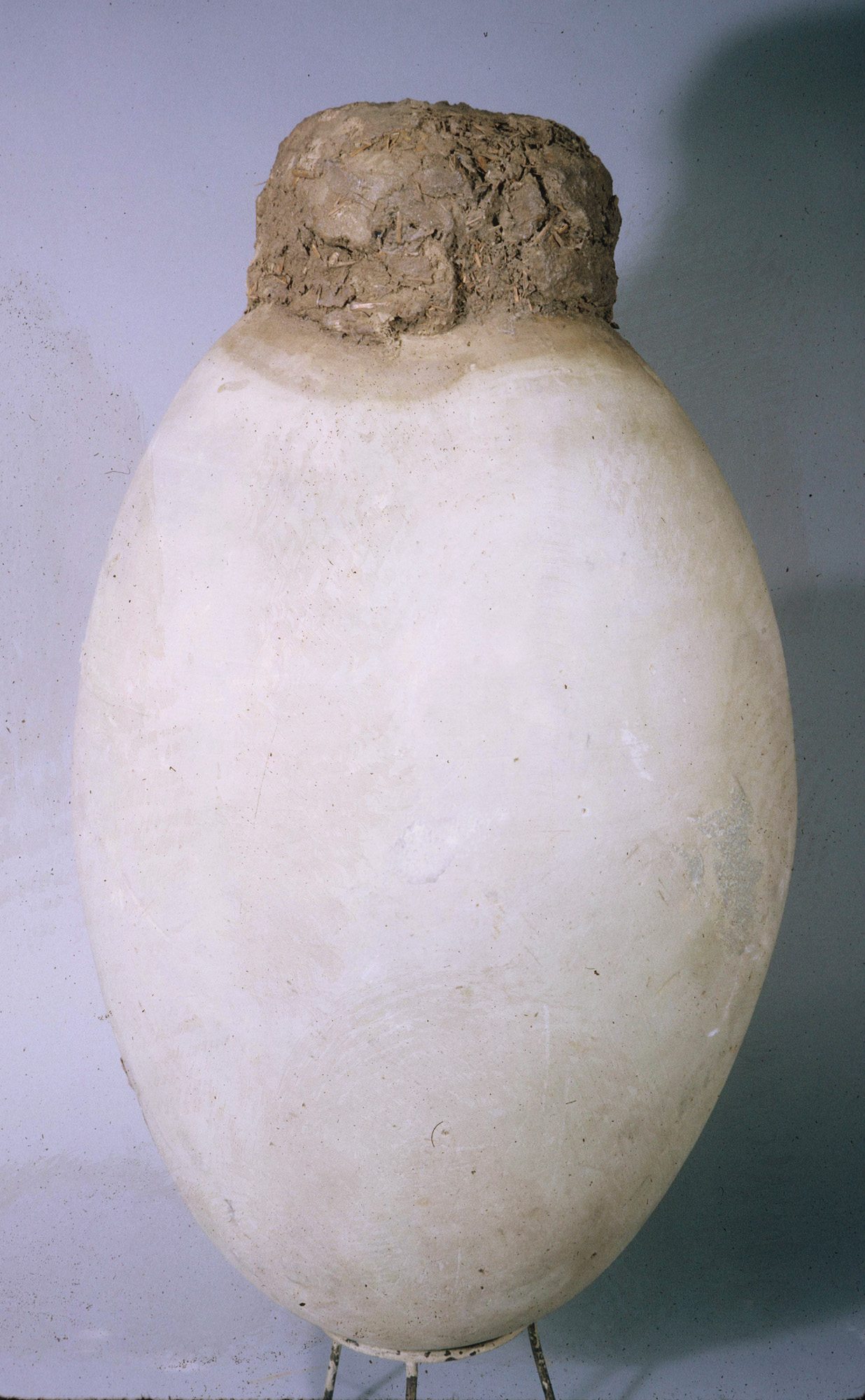
Jar (mummifing materials), Ipy

The datation of Ipi's lifetime is disputed, but he most likely lived during the early 12th Dynasty.
