= Berlin Papyrus 6619 =

Ancient Egyptian mathematical papyrus

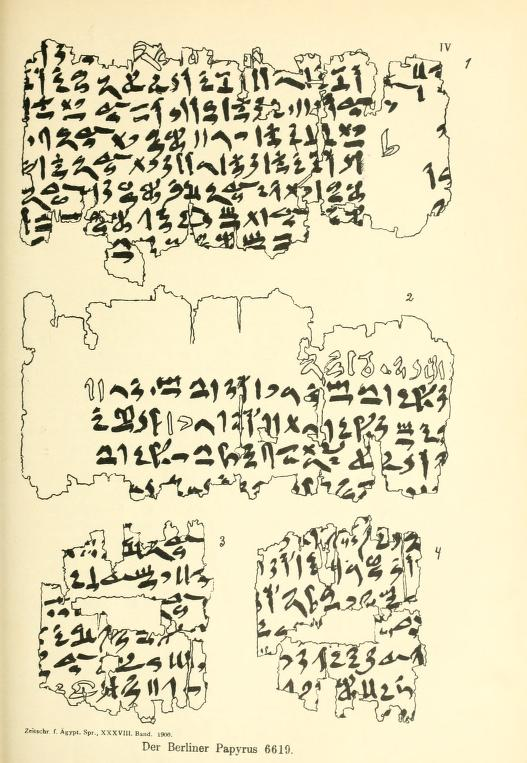
- Berlin Papyrus 6619, as reproduced in 1900 by Schack-Schackenburg
- Created: c. 1800 BC
- Discovered: Egypt
- Present location: Berlin, Germany

The Berlin Papyrus 6619, simply called the Berlin Papyrus when the context makes it clear, is one of the primary sources of ancient Egyptian mathematics and part of the Berlin Papyrus Collection. One of the two mathematics problems on the Papyrus may suggest that the ancient Egyptians knew the Pythagorean theorem.

== Description, dating, and provenance ==
The Berlin Papyrus 6619 is an ancient Egyptian papyrus document from the Middle Kingdom, second half of the 12th (c. 1990–1800 BC) or 13th Dynasty (c. 1800 BC – 1649 BC). It is written in the hieratic script. The two readable fragments were published by Hans Schack-Schackenburg in 1900 and 1902.

== Connection to the Pythagorean theorem ==
The Berlin Papyrus contains two problems, the first stated as "the area of a square of 100 is equal to that of two smaller squares. The side of one is ½ + ¼ the side of the other." The interest in the question may suggest some knowledge of the Pythagorean theorem, though the papyrus only shows a straightforward solution to a single second degree equation in one unknown. In modern terms, the simultaneous equations x^{2} + y^{2} = 100 and x = (3/4)y reduce to the single equation in y: ((3/4)y)^{2} + y^{2} = 100, giving the solution y = 8 and x = 6.

== See also ==
- List of ancient Egyptian papyri
- Papyrology
- Timeline of mathematics
- Egyptian fraction
