= Hekat =

Ancient Egyptian unit of volume

The hekat or heqat (transcribed HqA.t) was an ancient Egyptian volume unit used to measure grain, bread, and beer. It equals 4.8 litres, or about 1.056 imperial gallons, in today's measurements.

== Overview ==
Until the New Kingdom the hekat was one tenth of a khar, later one sixteenth; while the New Kingdom oipe (transcribed ip.t) contained 4 hekat. It was sub-divided into other units – some for medical prescriptions – the hin (1/10), dja (1/64) and ro (1/320). The dja was recently evaluated by Tanja Pommerening in 2002 to 1/64 of a hekat (75 cc) in the MK, and 1/64 of an oipe (1/16 of a hekat, or 300 cc) in the NK, meaning that the dja was denoted by Horus-Eye imagery. It has been suggested by Pommerening that the NK change came about related to the oipe replacing the hekat as the Pharaonic volume control unit in official lists.

Hana Vymazalova evaluated the hekat unit in 2002 within the Akhmim Wooden Tablet by showing that five answers were returned to (64/64) when multiplied by the divisors 3, 7, 10, 11 and 13. The RMP also divided a hekat unity (64/64) by prime and composite numbers n when 1/64 < n < 64. The binary quotient used Eye of Horus numbers. The remainder scaled Egyptian fractions to 1/320 units named ro. Quotients and unscaled remainders were obtained for the dja, ro and other units when the divisor n was greater than 64. For example, one the 1/320 ro unit was written by Ahmes by solving 320/n ro. Gillings cites 29 examples of two-part statements converted to one-part statements in RMP 82. Ahmes recorded the n = 3 case by showing (64/64)/3 = 21/64 + 1/192 (a modern statement) as written as(16 + 4 + 1)/64 + 5/3 × 1/320 = 1/4 + 1/16 + 1/64 + 1 2/3ro (two-part ancient statement). Two-part statements were also converted by Ahmes to an unscaled hin unit by writing 3 1/3 hin.

The hekat measurement unit, and its double entry accounting system, was found beyond the Rhind Mathematical Papyrus. Another text was the Ebers Papyrus, the best known medical text. The hekat unit was defined, in terms of its volume size, in the Moscow Mathematical Papyrus by MMP #10, by approximating π to around 3.16. The approximation of π was achieved by squaring a circle, increasingly (i.e. for the denominator in terms of setats: 9, 18, 36, 72, and 81, Gillings, page 141) until the vulgar fraction 256/81 was reached, the only relationship that was used in the Egyptian Middle Kingdom. The MMP scribe found the surface area of a basket equal to: (8d/9)^{2} = 64d^{2}/81, within a cylinder relationship to the hekat. MMP 10 data meant that d = 2 defined π for use in hekat volumes as 256/81. The 256/81 approximation was also used by Ahmes and other scribes. The ancient Egyptian units of measurement discussion further shows that the hekat was 1/30 of a royal cubit^{3}, an analysis that needs to double checked, against the d = 2 suggestion, which means that r = 1, a suggestion that does make sense. One royal cubit of the ancient Egyptian weights and measures = 523.5 millimeters. ((523.5 mm)^{3}) / 30 = 4.78221176 liters.

However that may be at least a sphere that has a circumference 523.5 millimeters will actually have a metric volume about 2.42269 liters or roughly half of a hekat or about one sixtieth of a royal cubic cubit to two parts in a hundred. A modern schoolbook formula has volume=4/3 pi r^{3} for example. In the case of a land where pi=256/81 or about 3.1604938 a similar result can be obtained with the different formula that has been suggested by Zapassky and others where over there the volume of a sphere is given by the quotient of the cube of the circumference divided by six pi^{2} (V=c^{3}/6π^{2}) and in that case the ancient Egyptian volume should come to about 2.386954 liters or about 98.5% of its true volume.
