= Red auxiliary number =

In the study of ancient Egyptian mathematics, red auxiliary numbers are numbers written in red ink in the Rhind Mathematical Papyrus, apparently used as aids for arithmetic computations involving fractions. It is considered to be the first examples of method that uses least common multiples.
