= Kahun Papyri =

Ancient Egyptian texts

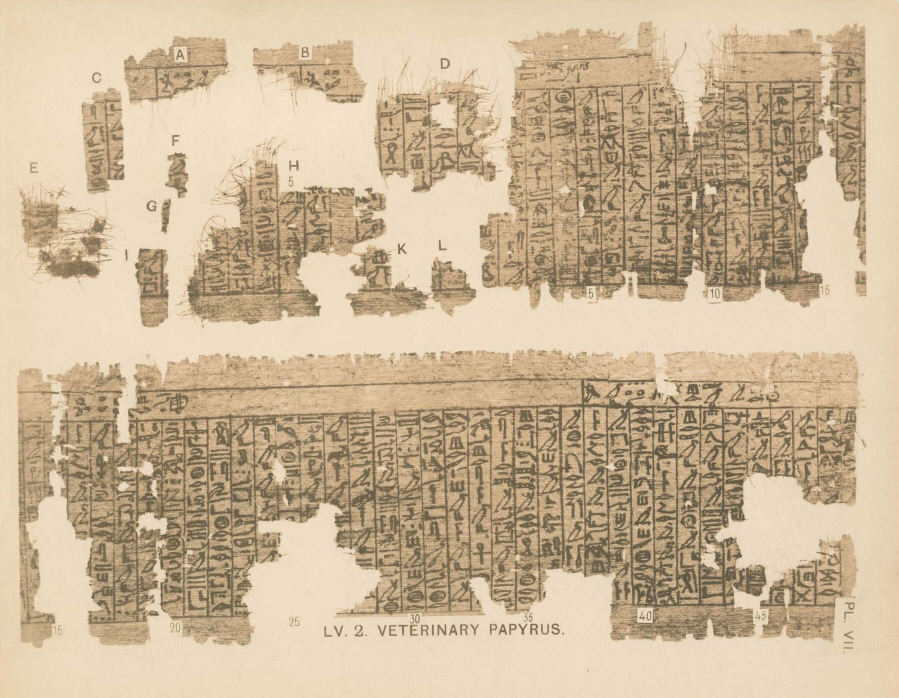
Fragments of the Kahun Papyrus on veterinary medicine

The Kahun Papyri (KP; also Petrie Papyri or Lahun Papyri) are a collection of ancient Egyptian texts discussing administrative, mathematical and medical topics. Its many fragments were discovered by Flinders Petrie in 1889 and are kept at the University College London. This collection of papyri is one of the largest ever found. Most of the texts are dated to ca. 1825 BC, to the reign of Amenemhat III. In general the collection spans the Middle Kingdom of Egypt.

The texts span a variety of topics:

- Business papers of the cult of Senusret II.
- Hymns to king Senusret III.
- The Kahun Gynaecological Papyrus, which deals with gynaecological illnesses and conditions.
- The Lahun Mathematical Papyri are a collection of mathematical texts.
- A veterinarian Papyrus
- A late Middle Kingdom account, listing festivals.

== See also ==
- List of ancient Egyptian papyri
