= Egyptian fraction =

Finite sum of distinct unit fractions

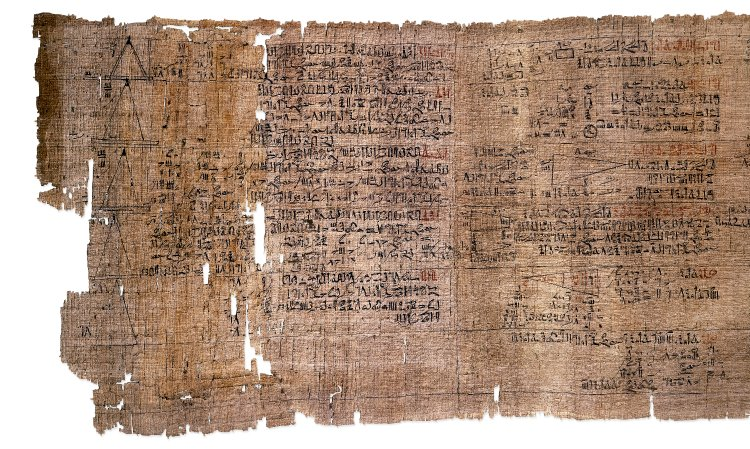
The Rhind Mathematical Papyrus

An Egyptian fraction is a finite sum of distinct unit fractions, such as
$$\frac{1}{2}+\frac{1}{3}+\frac{1}{16}.$$
That is, each fraction in the expression has a numerator equal to 1 and a denominator that is a positive integer, and all the denominators differ from each other. The value of an expression of this type is a positive rational number $\tfrac{a}{b}$; for instance the Egyptian fraction above sums to $\tfrac{43}{48}$. Every positive rational number can be represented by an Egyptian fraction. Sums of this type, and similar sums also including $\tfrac{2}{3}$ and $\tfrac{3}{4}$ as summands, were used as a serious notation for rational numbers by the ancient Egyptians, and continued to be used by other civilizations into medieval times. In modern mathematical notation, Egyptian fractions have been superseded by vulgar fractions and decimal notation. However, Egyptian fractions continue to be an object of study in modern number theory and recreational mathematics, as well as in modern historical studies of ancient mathematics.

== Applications ==
Beyond their historical use, Egyptian fractions have some practical advantages over other representations of fractional numbers. For instance, Egyptian fractions can help in dividing food or other objects into equal shares. For example, if one wants to divide 5 pizzas equally among 8 diners, the Egyptian fraction
$$\frac{5}{8}=\frac{1}{2}+\frac{1}{8}$$
means that each diner gets half a pizza plus another eighth of a pizza, for example by splitting 4 pizzas into 8 halves, and the remaining pizza into 8 eighths. Exercises in performing this sort of fair division of food are a standard classroom example in teaching students to work with unit fractions.

Egyptian fractions can provide a solution to rope-burning puzzles, in which a given duration is to be measured by igniting non-uniform ropes which burn out after a unit time. Any rational fraction of a unit of time can be measured by expanding the fraction into a sum of unit fractions and then, for each unit fraction $1/x$, burning a rope so that it always has $x$ simultaneously lit points where it is burning. For this application, it is not necessary for the unit fractions to be distinct from each other. However, this solution may need an infinite number of re-lighting steps.

== Early history ==
Egyptian fraction notation was developed in the Middle Kingdom of Egypt. Five early texts in which Egyptian fractions appear were the Egyptian Mathematical Leather Roll, the Moscow Mathematical Papyrus, the Reisner Papyrus, the Kahun Papyrus and the Akhmim Wooden Tablet. A later text, the Rhind Mathematical Papyrus, introduced improved ways of writing Egyptian fractions. The Rhind papyrus was written by Ahmes and dates from the Second Intermediate Period; it includes a table of Egyptian fraction expansions for rational numbers $\tfrac{2}{n}$, as well as 84 word problems. Solutions to each problem were written out in scribal shorthand, with the final answers of all 84 problems being expressed in Egyptian fraction notation. Tables of expansions for $\tfrac{2}{n}$ similar to the one on the Rhind papyrus also appear on some of the other texts. However, as the Kahun Papyrus shows, vulgar fractions were also used by scribes within their calculations.

=== Notation ===
To write the unit fractions used in their Egyptian fraction notation, in hieroglyph script, the Egyptians placed the hieroglyph:

D21

(er, "[one] among" or possibly re, mouth) above a number to represent the reciprocal of that number. Similarly, in hieratic script they drew a line over the letter representing the number. For example:

D21 Z1 Z1 Z1	$= \frac{1}{3}$	D21 V20	$= \frac{1}{10}$

The Egyptians had special symbols for $\tfrac{1}{2}$, $\tfrac{2}{3}$, and $\tfrac{3}{4}$ that were used to reduce the size of numbers greater than $\tfrac{1}{2}$ when such numbers were converted to an Egyptian fraction series. The remaining number after subtracting one of these special fractions was written as a sum of distinct unit fractions according to the usual Egyptian fraction notation.

Aa13	$= \frac{1}{2}$	D22	$= \frac{2}{3}$	D23	$= \frac{3}{4}$

The Egyptians also used an alternative notation modified from the Old Kingdom to denote a special set of fractions of the form $1/2^k$ (for $k=1,2,\dots,6$) and sums of these numbers, which are necessarily dyadic rational numbers. These have been called "Horus-Eye fractions" after a theory (now discredited) that they were based on the parts of the Eye of Horus symbol. They were used in the Middle Kingdom in conjunction with the later notation for Egyptian fractions to subdivide a hekat, the primary ancient Egyptian volume measure for grain, bread, and other small quantities of volume, as described in the Akhmim Wooden Tablet. If any remainder was left after expressing a quantity in Eye of Horus fractions of a hekat, the remainder was written using the usual Egyptian fraction notation as multiples of a ro, a unit equal to $\tfrac{1}{320}$ of a hekat.

=== Calculation methods ===
Modern historians of mathematics have studied the Rhind papyrus and other ancient sources in an attempt to discover the methods the Egyptians used in calculating with Egyptian fractions. In particular, study in this area has concentrated on understanding the tables of expansions for numbers of the form $\tfrac{2}{n}$ in the Rhind papyrus. Although these expansions can generally be described as algebraic identities, the methods used by the Egyptians may not correspond directly to these identities. Additionally, the expansions in the table do not match any single identity; rather, different identities match the expansions for prime and for composite denominators, and more than one identity fits the numbers of each type:

- For small odd prime denominators $p$, the expansion
  $$\frac{2}{p} = \frac{1}{(p + 1)/2} + \frac{1}{p(p + 1)/2}$$
  was used.
- For larger prime denominators, an expansion of the form
  $$\frac{2}{p} = \frac{1}{A} + \frac{2A-p}{Ap}$$
  was used, where $A$ is a number with many divisors (such as a practical number) between $\tfrac{p}{2}$ and $p$. The remaining term $(2A-p)/Ap$ was expanded by representing the number $2A-p$ as a sum of divisors of $A$ and forming a fraction $\tfrac{d}{Ap}$ for each such divisor $d$ in this sum. As an example, Ahmes' expansion $\tfrac{2}{37}=\tfrac{1}{24}+\tfrac{1}{111}+\tfrac{1}{296}$ fits this pattern with $A=24$ and $2A-p=11=8+3$, as $\tfrac{1}{111}=\tfrac{8}{24\cdot 37}$ and $\tfrac{1}{296}=\tfrac{3}{24\cdot 37}$. There may be many different expansions of this type for a given $p$; however, as K. S. Brown observed, the expansion chosen by the Egyptians was often the one that caused the largest denominator to be as small as possible, among all expansions fitting this pattern.
- For some composite denominators, factored as $p\cdot q$, the expansion for $\tfrac{2}{pq}$ has the form of an expansion for $\tfrac{2}{p}$ with each denominator multiplied by $q$. This method appears to have been used for many of the composite numbers in the Rhind papyrus, but there are exceptions, notably $\tfrac{2}{35}$, $\tfrac{2}{91}$, and $\tfrac{2}{95}$.
- One can also expand
  $$\frac{2}{pq}=\frac{1}{p(p+q)/2}+\frac{1}{q(p+q)/2}.$$
  For instance, Ahmes expands $\tfrac{2}{35}=\tfrac{2}{5\cdot 7}=\tfrac{1}{30}+\tfrac{1}{42}$. Later scribes used a more general form of this expansion,
  $$\frac{n}{pq}=\frac{1}{p(p+q)/n}+\frac{1}{q(p+q)/n},$$
  which works when $p+q$ is a multiple of $n$.
- The final (prime) expansion in the Rhind papyrus, $\tfrac{2}{101}$, does not fit any of these forms, but instead uses an expansion
  $$\frac{2}{p} = \frac{1}{p} + \frac{1}{2p} + \frac{1}{3p} + \frac{1}{6p}$$
  that may be applied regardless of the value of $p$. That is, $\tfrac{2}{101} = \tfrac{1}{101} + \tfrac{1}{202} + \tfrac{1}{303} + \tfrac{1}{606}$. A related expansion was also used in the Egyptian Mathematical Leather Roll for several cases.

== Later usage ==
Egyptian fraction notation continued to be used in Greek times and into the Middle Ages, despite complaints as early as Ptolemy's Almagest about the clumsiness of the notation compared to alternatives such as the Babylonian base-60 notation. Related problems of decomposition into unit fractions were also studied in 9th-century India by Jain mathematician Mahāvīra. An important text of medieval European mathematics, the Liber Abaci (1202) of Leonardo of Pisa (more commonly known as Fibonacci), provides some insight into the uses of Egyptian fractions in the Middle Ages, and introduces topics that continue to be important in modern mathematical study of these series.

The primary subject of the Liber Abaci is calculations involving decimal and vulgar fraction notation, which eventually replaced Egyptian fractions. Fibonacci himself used a complex notation for fractions involving a combination of a mixed radix notation with sums of fractions. Many of the calculations throughout Fibonacci's book involve numbers represented as Egyptian fractions, and one section of this book provides a list of methods for conversion of vulgar fractions to Egyptian fractions. If the number is not already a unit fraction, the first method in this list is to attempt to split the numerator into a sum of divisors of the denominator; this is possible whenever the denominator is a practical number, and Liber Abaci includes tables of expansions of this type for the practical numbers 6, 8, 12, 20, 24, 60, and 100.

The next several methods involve algebraic identities such as
$$\frac{a}{ab-1}=\frac{1}{b}+\frac{1}{b(ab-1)}.$$
For instance, Fibonacci represents the fraction $\tfrac{8}{11}$ by splitting the numerator into a sum of two numbers, each of which divides one plus the denominator: $\tfrac{8}{11}=\tfrac{6}{11}+\tfrac{2}{11}$. Fibonacci applies the algebraic identity above to each these two parts, producing the expansion $\tfrac{8}{11}=\tfrac{1}{2}+\tfrac{1}{22}+\tfrac{1}{6}+\tfrac{1}{66}$. Fibonacci describes similar methods for denominators that are two or three less than a number with many factors.

In the rare case that these other methods all fail, Fibonacci suggests a "greedy" algorithm for computing Egyptian fractions, in which one repeatedly chooses the unit fraction with the smallest denominator that is no larger than the remaining fraction to be expanded: that is, in more modern notation, this method replaces a fraction $\tfrac{x}{y}$ by the expansion
$$\frac{x}{y}=\frac{1}{\,\left\lceil \frac{y}{x} \right\rceil\,}+\frac{(-y)\,\bmod\, x}{y\left\lceil \frac{y}{x}\right\rceil},$$
where $\lceil\ \rceil$ represents the ceiling function; since $(-y)\bmod{x}<x$, this method yields a finite expansion.

Fibonacci suggests switching to another method after the first such expansion, but he also gives examples in which this greedy expansion was iterated until a complete Egyptian fraction expansion was constructed: $\tfrac{4}{13}=\tfrac{1}{4}+\tfrac{1}{18}+\tfrac{1}{468}$ and $\tfrac{17}{29}=\tfrac{1}{2}+\tfrac{1}{12}+\tfrac{1}{348}$.

Compared to ancient Egyptian expansions or to more modern methods, this method may produce expansions that are quite long, with large denominators, and Fibonacci himself noted the awkwardness of the expansions produced by this method. For instance, the greedy method expands
$$\frac{5}{121}=\frac{1}{25}+\frac{1}{757}+\frac{1}{763\,309}+\frac{1}{873\,960\,180\,913}+\frac{1}{1\,527\,612\,795\,642\,093\,418\,846\,225},$$
while other methods lead to the shorter expansion
$$\frac{5}{121}=\frac{1}{33}+\frac{1}{121}+\frac{1}{363}.$$

Sylvester's sequence 2, 3, 7, 43, 1807, ... can be viewed as generated by an infinite greedy expansion of this type for the number 1, where at each step we choose the denominator $\lfloor\tfrac{y}{x}\rfloor+1$ instead of $\lceil\tfrac{y}{x}\rceil$, and sometimes Fibonacci's greedy algorithm is attributed to James Joseph Sylvester.

After his description of the greedy algorithm, Fibonacci suggests yet another method, expanding a fraction $\tfrac{a}{b}$ by searching for a number $c$ having many divisors, with $\tfrac{b}{2}<c<b$, replacing $\tfrac{a}{b}$ by $\tfrac{ac}{bc}$, and expanding $ac$ as a sum of divisors of $bc$, similar to the method proposed by Hultsch and Bruins to explain some of the expansions in the Rhind papyrus.

== Modern number theory ==
Although Egyptian fractions are no longer used in most practical applications of mathematics, modern number theorists have continued to study many different problems related to them. These include problems of bounding the length or maximum denominator in Egyptian fraction representations, finding expansions of certain special forms or in which the denominators are all of some special type, the termination of various methods for Egyptian fraction expansion, and showing that expansions exist for any sufficiently dense set of sufficiently smooth numbers.

- One of the earliest publications of Paul Erdős proved that it is not possible for a harmonic progression to form an Egyptian fraction representation of an integer. The reason is that, necessarily, at least one denominator of the progression will be divisible by a prime number that does not divide any other denominator. The latest publication of Erdős, nearly 20 years after his death, proves that every integer has a representation in which all denominators are products of three primes.
- The Erdős–Graham conjecture in combinatorial number theory states that, if the integers greater than 1 are partitioned into finitely many subsets, then one of the subsets has a finite subset of itself whose reciprocals sum to one. That is, for every r > 0, and every r-coloring of the integers greater than one, there is a finite monochromatic subset S of these integers such that
  $$\sum_{n\in S}\frac{1}{n} = 1.$$
  The conjecture was proven in 2003 by Ernest S. Croot III.
- Znám's problem and primary pseudoperfect numbers are closely related to the existence of Egyptian fractions of the form
  $$\sum\frac1{x_i} + \prod\frac1{x_i}=1.$$
  For instance, the primary pseudoperfect number 1806 is the product of the prime numbers 2, 3, 7, and 43, and gives rise to the Egyptian fraction 1 = 1/2 + 1/3 + 1/7 + 1/43 + 1/1806.
- Egyptian fractions are normally defined as requiring all denominators to be distinct, but this requirement can be relaxed to allow repeated denominators. However, this relaxed form of Egyptian fractions does not allow for any number to be represented using fewer fractions, as any expansion with repeated fractions can be converted to an Egyptian fraction of equal or smaller length (as a mixed fraction that also allows whole numbers) by repeated application of the replacement
  $$\frac1k+\frac1k=\frac2{k+1}+\frac2{k(k+1)}$$
  if k is odd, or simply by replacing 1/k + 1/k by 2/k if k is even. This result was first proven by Takenouchi (1921).
- Graham and Jewett proved that it is similarly possible to convert expansions with repeated denominators to (longer) Egyptian fractions, via the replacement
  $$\frac1k+\frac1k=\frac1k+\frac1{k+1}+\frac1{k(k+1)}.$$
  This method can lead to long expansions with large denominators, such as
  $$\frac45=\frac15+\frac16+\frac17+\frac18+\frac1{30}+\frac1{31}+\frac1{32}+\frac1{42}+\frac1{43}+\frac1{56}+
\frac1{930}+\frac1{931}+\frac1{992}+\frac1{1806}+\frac1{865\,830}.$$
  Botts (1967) had originally used this replacement technique to show that any rational number has Egyptian fraction representations with arbitrarily large minimum denominators.
- Every fraction $\tfrac{x}{y}$ has an Egyptian fraction representation with $O(\log\log y)$ terms, resolving a conjecture of. For some fractions $\tfrac{x}{y}$, the number of terms must be at least proportional to $\log\log y$; for instance this is true for the fractions in the sequence 1/2, 2/3, 6/7, 42/43, 1806/1807, ... whose denominators form Sylvester's sequence.
- Every fraction $\tfrac{x}{y}$ has an Egyptian fraction representation in which the maximum denominator is bounded by
  $$O\left(y \log y \left(\log\log y\right)^4 \left(\log\log\log y\right)^2\right).$$
  It is also possible to find representations in which both the maximum denominator and the number of terms are small.
- Graham (1964) characterized the numbers that can be represented by Egyptian fractions in which all denominators are nth powers. In particular, a rational number q can be represented as an Egyptian fraction with square denominators if and only if q lies in one of the two half-open intervals
  $$\left[0,\frac{\pi^2}{6}-1\right)\cup\left[1,\frac{\pi^2}{6}\right).$$
- Martin (1999) showed that any rational number has very dense expansions, using a constant fraction of the denominators up to $N$ for any sufficiently large $N$.
- Engel expansion, sometimes called an Egyptian product, is a form of Egyptian fraction expansion in which each denominator is a multiple of the previous one:
  $$x=\frac{1}{a_1}+\frac{1}{a_1a_2}+\frac{1}{a_1a_2a_3}+\cdots.$$
  In addition, the sequence of multipliers a_{i} is required to be nondecreasing. Every rational number has a finite Engel expansion, while irrational numbers have an infinite Engel expansion.
- Anshel & Goldfeld (1991) study numbers that have multiple distinct Egyptian fraction representations with the same number of terms and the same product of denominators; for instance, one of the examples they supply is
  $$\frac{5}{12}=\frac{1}{4}+\frac{1}{10}+\frac{1}{15}=\frac{1}{5}+\frac{1}{6}+\frac{1}{20}.$$
  Unlike the ancient Egyptians, they allow denominators to be repeated in these expansions. They apply their results for this problem to the characterization of free products of Abelian groups by a small number of numerical parameters: the rank of the commutator subgroup, the number of terms in the free product, and the product of the orders of the factors.
- The number of different $n$-term Egyptian fraction representations of the number one is bounded above and below by double exponential functions of $n$.
- The number of different Egyptian fraction representations of the number one with maximum denominator at most $n$ is bounded above and below by a function of the form
  $$2^{cn+o(n)},$$
  for $c\approx 0.91117$. More generally, for every rational number $x$, there is a bound of the same form but with a different constant $c$, depending on $x$.

== Open problems ==
Some notable problems remain unsolved with regard to Egyptian fractions, despite considerable effort by mathematicians.

- The Erdős–Straus conjecture concerns the length of the shortest expansion for a fraction of the form 4/n. Does an expansion
  $$\frac4n=\frac1x+\frac1y+\frac1z$$
  exist for every n? It is known to be true for all n < 10^{17}, and for all but a vanishingly small fraction of possible values of n, but the general truth of the conjecture remains unknown.
- It is unknown whether an odd greedy expansion exists for every fraction with an odd denominator. If Fibonacci's greedy method is modified so that it always chooses the smallest possible odd denominator, under what conditions does this modified algorithm produce a finite expansion? An obvious necessary condition is that the starting fraction x/y have an odd denominator y, and it is conjectured but not known that this is also a sufficient condition. It is known that every x/y with odd y has an expansion into distinct odd unit fractions, constructed using a different method than the greedy algorithm.
- It is possible to use brute-force search algorithms to find the Egyptian fraction representation of a given number with the fewest possible terms or minimizing the largest denominator; however, such algorithms can be quite inefficient. The existence of polynomial time algorithms for these problems, or more generally the computational complexity of such problems, remains unknown.

Guy (2004) describes these problems in more detail and lists numerous additional open problems.

== See also ==
- List of sums of reciprocals
- 17-animal inheritance puzzle
