= Akhmim wooden tablets =

Ancient Egyptian texts

The Akhmim wooden tablets, also known as the Cairo wooden tablets are two wooden writing tablets from ancient Egypt, solving arithmetical problems. They each measure around 18 by 10 inches (460 mm × 250 mm) and are covered with plaster. The tablets are inscribed on both sides. The hieroglyphic inscriptions on the first tablet include a list of servants, which is followed by a mathematical text. The text is dated to year 38 (it was at first thought to be from year 28) of an otherwise unnamed king's reign. The general dating to the early Egyptian Middle Kingdom combined with the high regnal year suggests that the tablets may date to the reign of the 12th Dynasty pharaoh Senusret I, c. 1950 BC. The second tablet also lists several servants and contains further mathematical texts.

The tablets are currently housed at the Museum of Egyptian Antiquities in Cairo. The text was reported by Daressy in 1901 and later analyzed and published in 1906.

The first half of the tablet details five multiplications of a hekat, a unit of volume made up of 64 dja, by 1/3, 1/7, 1/10, 1/11 and 1/13. The answers were written in binary Eye of Horus quotients and exact Egyptian fraction remainders, scaled to a 1/320 factor named ro. The second half of the document proved the correctness of the five division answers by multiplying the two-part quotient and remainder answer by its respective (3, 7, 10, 11 and 13) dividend that returned the ab initio hekat unity, 64/64.

In 2002, Hana Vymazalová obtained a fresh copy of the text from the Cairo Museum, and confirmed that all five two-part answers were correctly checked for accuracy by the scribe that returned a 64/64 hekat unity. Minor typographical errors in Daressy's copy of two problems, the division by 11 and 13 data, were corrected at this time. That all five divisions had been exact was suspected by Daressy but was not proven until 1906.

== Mathematical content ==
=== 1/3 case ===
The first problem divides 1 hekat by writing it as $1/2 + 1/4 + 1/8 + 1/16 + 1/32 + 1/64$ + (5 ro) (which equals 1) and dividing that expression by 3.

- The scribe first divides the remainder of 5 ro by 3, and determines that it is equal to (1 + 2/3) ro.
- Next, the scribe finds 1/3 of the rest of the equation and determines it is equal to $1/4 + 1/16 + 1/64$.
- The final step in the problem consists of checking that the answer is correct. The scribe multiplies $1/4 + 1/16 + 1/64 + (1 + 2/3) ro$ by 3 and shows that the answer is (1/2 + 1/4 + 1/8 + 1/16 + 1/32 + 1/64) + (5 ro), which he knows is equal to 1.

In modern mathematical notation, one might say that the scribe showed that 3 times the hekat fraction (1/4 + 1/16 + 1/64) is equal to 63/64, and that 3 times the remainder part, (1 + 2/3) ro, is equal to 5 ro, which is equal to 1/64 of a hekat, which sums to the initial hekat unity (64/64).

=== Other fractions ===
The other problems on the tablets were computed by the same technique. The scribe used the identity 1 hekat = 320 ro and divided 64 by 7, 10, 11 and 13. For instance, in the 1/11 computation, the division of 64 by 11 gave 5 with a remainder 45/11 ro. This was equivalent to (1/16 + 1/64) hekat + (4 + 1/11) ro. Checking the work required the scribe to multiply the two-part number by 11 and showed the result 63/64 + 1/64 = 64/64, as all five proofs reported.

=== Accuracy ===
The computations show several minor mistakes. For instance, in the 1/7 computations, $2 \times 7$ was said to be 12 and the double of that 24 in all of the copies of the problem. The mistake takes place in exactly the same place in each of the versions of this problem, but the scribe manages to find the correct answer in spite of this error since the 64/64 hekat unity guided his thinking. The fourth copy of the 1/7 division contains an extra minor error in one of the lines.

The 1/11 computation occurs four times and the problems appear right next to one another, leaving the impression that the scribe was practicing the computation procedure. The 1/13 computation appears once in its complete form and twice more with only partial computations. There are errors in the computations, but the scribe does find the correct answer. 1/10 is the only fraction computed only once. There are no mistakes in the computations for this problem.

== Hekat problems in other texts ==
The Rhind Mathematical Papyrus (RMP) contained over 60 examples of hekat multiplication and division in RMP 35, 36, 37, 38, 47, 80, 81, 82, 83 and 84. The problems were different since the hekat unity was changed from the 64/64 binary hekat and ro remainder standard as needed to a second 320/320 standard recorded in 320 ro statements. Some examples include:

- Problems 35–38 find fractions of the hekat. Problem 38 scaled one hekat to 320 ro and multiplied by 7/22. The answer 101 9/11 ro was proven by multiplying by 22/7, facts not mentioned by Claggett and scholars prior to Vymazalova.
- Problem 47 scaled 100 hekat to (6400/64) and multiplied (6400/64) by 1/10, 1/20, 1/30, 1/40, 1/50, 1/60, 1/70, 1/80, 1/90 and 1/100 fractions to binary quotient and 1/1320 (ro) remainder unit fraction series.
- Problem 80 gave 5 Horus eye fractions of the hekat and equivalent fractions as expressions of another unit called the hinu. These were left unclear prior to Vymazalova. Problem 81 generally converted hekat unity binary quotient and ro remainder statements to equivalent 1/10 hinu units making it clear the meaning of the RMP 80 data.

The Ebers Papyrus is a famous late Middle Kingdom medical text. Its raw data were written in hekat one-parts suggested by the Akhim wooden tablets, handling divisors greater than 64.
