= Aha =

AHA, Aha, or aha may refer to:

== Arts, entertainment and media ==
- a-ha, a Norwegian pop music band
- Aha (streaming service), an Indian service offering Telugu content
- Association of Hispanic Arts, a New York-based non-profit organization that promotes the work of Hispanic artists
- "Aha!", a 2009 song by British singer Imogen Heap

== Hockey ==
- Amateur Hockey Association, an amateur men's ice hockey league in Canada from 1886 to 1898
- American Hockey Association (1926–1942)
- American Hockey Association (1992–1993)
- Atlantic Hockey America, an NCAA Division I ice hockey conference with men's and women's divisions which operates primarily in the northeastern U.S.
- Atlantic Hockey Association, a men-only ice hockey conference which merged into the new Atlantic Hockey America in 2024

== Organizations ==
- AHA Foundation, a nonprofit organization for the defense of women's rights
- Administration for a Healthy America, a proposed operating agency of the U.S. Department of Health and Human Services
- Allianz vun Humanisten, Atheisten an Agnostiker, an association of humanists, atheists and agnostics based in Luxembourg
- American Heart Association, a non-profit organization in the US that promotes cardiac care
- American Hebrew Academy, an American Jewish pluralistic college preparatory boarding school
- American Historical Association, the oldest and largest society of historians in the US
- American Homebrewers Association, an American trade group concerned with the promotion of craft beer and homebrewing
- American Hospital Association, a trade group founded in 1898 to the promote health care industry
- American Humane Association, an organization founded in 1877 dedicated to the welfare of animals and children
- American Humanist Association, an educational organization in the US that advances secular humanism
- Arabian Horse Association, an organization that registers Arabian horses in the US
- Area health authority, a former type of administrative organisation of the NHS in England and Wales
- Association of Hispanic Arts, a New York-based non-profit organization that promotes the work of Hispanic artists
- Atlanta Housing Authority, an organization to develop, acquire, lease and operate affordable housing
- Australian Hotels Association, an employer advocacy and lobby group representing hoteliers around Australia

== People ==
- Hor-Aha, a First Dynasty Egyptian pharaoh
- Rabbi Aha, fourth century rabbi in the Land of Israel
- Aha bar Jacob, third or fourth century Babylonian rabbi
- Aha b. Rava, fourth or fifth century Babylonian rabbi
- Achai Gaon, also known as Aha of Shabḥa, eighth century Talmudist and scholar

== Science and technology ==
- Alpha hydroxy acid, a class of chemical compounds that consist of a carboxylic acid substituted with a hydroxyl group on the adjacent carbon
- Aha (wasp), a genus of Australian wasp
  - Aha ha, an Aha species abbreviated as A. ha
- Avoid hasty abstractions, a computer programming methodology

== Other uses ==
- Aboriginal Heritage Act 1972, Western Australian legislation also known as the AHA
- Aboriginal Heritage Act 1988, South Australian legislation also known as the AHA
- Aboriginal Heritage Act 2006, legislation of the state of Victoria, Australia, also known as the AHA
- Aha, an Egyptian phrase found on the Rhind Papyrus
- Aha (Book of Mormon), a Nephite soldier
- Ahanta language (ISO 639-3 code AHA)
- Aha, Aeon of Elation in Honkai: Star Rail

== See also ==
- Aha! (disambiguation)
- AAHA (disambiguation)
- Aahaa (disambiguation)
- Aha experience, an insight that manifests itself suddenly
- Aha Khani, a village in Hormozgan Province, Iran
