= AAHA =

AAHA or Aaha may refer to:

== Organizations ==
- All American Hockey League (2008–2011), formerly the All American Hockey Association
- American Amputee Hockey Association, also an ice hockey league in the U.S.
- The former Alberta Amateur Hockey Association, now known as Hockey Alberta

== Film and television ==
- Aahaa..! (1997 film), a Tamil language film
- Aahaa..! (1998 film), a Telugu language film
- Aaha (2021 film), a Malayalam language film
- Aaha (TV series), a 2011-12 Tamil series

== See also ==
- Aahaa (disambiguation)
- AHA (disambiguation)
- Aha! (disambiguation)
