= Miscophus americanus =

Scientific classification
- Domain: Eukaryota
- Kingdom: Animalia
- Phylum: Arthropoda
- Class: Insecta
- Order: Hymenoptera
- Family: Crabronidae
- Tribe: Miscophini
- Genus: Miscophus
- Species: M. americanus

Binomial name
- Miscophus americanus W. Fox, 1890

Species of wasp

Miscophus americanus is a species of square-headed wasp in the family Crabronidae. It is found in North America.
