= Plenoculus davisi =

Scientific classification
- Domain: Eukaryota
- Kingdom: Animalia
- Phylum: Arthropoda
- Class: Insecta
- Order: Hymenoptera
- Family: Crabronidae
- Tribe: Miscophini
- Genus: Plenoculus
- Species: P. davisi

Binomial name
- Plenoculus davisi W. Fox, 1893

Synonyms
- Plenoculus abdominalis Ashmead, 1899; Plenoculus apicalis F. Williams, 1914

Species of wasp

Plenoculus davisi is a species of square-headed wasp in the family Crabronidae. It is found in North America.

== Subspecies ==
These five subspecies belong to the species Plenoculus davisi:

- Plenoculus davisi atlanticus Viereck, 1902
- Plenoculus davisi davisi W. Fox, 1893
- Plenoculus davisi gracilis F. Williams, 1960
- Plenoculus davisi mojavensis F. Williams, 1960
- Plenoculus davisi transversus F. Williams, 1960
