= Aha! =

Aha! or AHA! may refer to:

- AHA! A Hands-On Adventure, a children's museum in Lancaster, Ohio, US
- Aha! (airline brand), a defunct American regional airline brand
- Aha! (company), an American software company
- Aha! (film), a 2007 Bangladeshi film
- Aha! Insight (1978), a book by Martin Gardner
- Aha! (tabloid), a newspaper published in the Czech Republic
- Aha! (TV program), an information and education TV program in the Philippines
- "Aha!", a song by Imogen Heap

== See also ==
- AHA (disambiguation)
- Aahaa (disambiguation)
- AAHA (disambiguation)
