= List of Miscophus species =

These species belong to Miscophus, a genus of square-headed wasps in the family Crabronidae.

== Miscophus species ==
- Miscophus absconditus de Andrade, 1960^{i c g}
- Miscophus aegyptius Morice, 1897^{i c g}
- Miscophus aenescens (Bridwell, 1920)^{i c g}
- Miscophus aeneus Lomholdt, 1985^{i c g}
- Miscophus aenigma Honoré, 1944^{i c g}
- Miscophus affinis Pulawski, 1964^{i c g}
- Miscophus agadiriensis de Andrade, 1954^{i c g}
- Miscophus akrofisianus Balthasar, 1954^{i c g}
- Miscophus albomaculatus de Andrade, 1960^{i c g}
- Miscophus albufeirae de Andrade, 1952^{i c g}
- Miscophus alfierii Honoré, 1944^{i c g}
- Miscophus americanus W. Fox, 1890^{i c g b}
- Miscophus andradei P. Verhoeff, 1955^{i c g}
- Miscophus angolensis Lomholdt, 1985^{i c g}
- Miscophus antares de Andrade, 1956^{i c g}
- Miscophus arenarum Cockerell, 1898^{i c g}
- Miscophus ater Lepeletier de Saint Fargeau, 1845^{i c g}
- Miscophus atlanteus de Andrade, 1956^{i c g}
- Miscophus atrescens Lomholdt, 1985^{i c g}
- Miscophus aurulentus Lomholdt, 1985^{i c g}
- Miscophus bellulus Arnold, 1924^{i c g}
- Miscophus belveriensis de Andrade, 1960^{i c g}
- Miscophus benidormicus P. Verhoeff, 1955^{i c g}
- Miscophus berlandi de Andrade, 1956^{i c g}
- Miscophus betpakdalensis Kazenas, 1992^{i c g}
- Miscophus bicolor Jurine, 1807^{i c g}
- Miscophus bonifaciensis Ferton, 1896^{i c g}
- Miscophus botswanaensis Lomholdt, 1985^{i c g}
- Miscophus bridwelli Lomholdt, 1985^{i c g}
- Miscophus bytinskii P. Verhoeff, 1955^{i c g}
- Miscophus californicus (Ashmead, 1898)^{i c g}
- Miscophus canariensis de Beaumont, 1968^{i c g}
- Miscophus caninus de Andrade, 1953^{i c g}
- Miscophus carolinae Schmid-Egger, 2002^{i c g}
- Miscophus ceballosi de Andrade, 1954^{i c g}
- Miscophus chrysis Kohl, 1894^{i c g}
- Miscophus clypearis Honoré, 1944^{i c g}
- Miscophus coerulescens Arnold, 1923^{i}
- Miscophus collaris Honoré, 1944^{i c g}
- Miscophus concolor Dahlbom, 1844^{i c g}
- Miscophus corsicus de Andrade, 1960^{i c g}
- Miscophus crassipes Lomholdt, 1985^{i c g}
- Miscophus ctenopus Kohl, 1884^{i c g}
- Miscophus cyanescens R. Turner, 1917^{i c g}
- Miscophus cyanurus (Rohwer, 1909)^{i c g}
- Miscophus deserti Berland, 1943^{c g}
- Miscophus deserticolus R. Turner, 1929^{i c g}
- Miscophus desertorum Kazenas, 1978^{i c g}
- Miscophus difficilis Nurse, 1903^{i c g}
- Miscophus dispersus de Andrade, 1954^{i c g}
- Miscophus eatoni E. Saunders, 1903^{i c g}
- Miscophus eburneus Simon Thomas, 1995^{i c g}
- Miscophus elegans de Andrade, 1960^{i c g}
- Miscophus evansi (Krombein, 1963)^{i c g}
- Miscophus eximius Gussakovskij, 1934^{i c g}
- Miscophus exoticus Taschenberg, 1870^{i c g}
- Miscophus fasciatus Lomholdt, 1985^{i c g}
- Miscophus flavopictus Pulawski, 1964^{i c g}
- Miscophus fluviatilis Lomholdt, 1985^{i c g}
- Miscophus funebris Honoré, 1944^{i c g}
- Miscophus galei (Rohwer, 1909)^{i c g}
- Miscophus garianensis de Andrade, 1956^{i c g}
- Miscophus gegensumus Tsuneki, 1971^{i c g}
- Miscophus gibbicollis Giner Marí, 1945^{i c g}
- Miscophus gineri P. Verhoeff, 1955^{i c g}
- Miscophus gobiensis Tsuneki, 1972^{i c g}
- Miscophus grangeri de Beaumont, 1968^{i c g}
- Miscophus gratiosus de Andrade, 1960^{i c g}
- Miscophus gratuitus de Andrade, 1954^{i c g}
- Miscophus guichardi de Beaumont, 1968^{i c g}
- Miscophus gussakovskiji de Andrade, 1954^{i c g}
- Miscophus handlirschi Kohl, 1892^{i c g}
- Miscophus hebraeus de Andrade, 1954^{i c g}
- Miscophus heliophilus Pulawski, 1968^{i c g}
- Miscophus helveticus Kohl, 1883^{i c g}
- Miscophus hissaricus Gussakovskij, 1935^{i c g}
- Miscophus histrionicus Balthasar, 1954^{i c g}
- Miscophus ichneumonoides Arnold, 1929^{i c g}
- Miscophus iliensis Kazenas, 1992^{i c g}
- Miscophus imitans Giner Marí, 1945^{i c g}
- Miscophus impressifrons Lomholdt, 1985^{i c g}
- Miscophus impudens de Andrade, 1960^{i c g}
- Miscophus inconspicuus de Andrade, 1960^{i c g}
- Miscophus infernalis Arnold, 1929^{i c g}
- Miscophus insolitus de Andrade, 1953^{i c g}
- Miscophus insulicola Balthasar, 1954^{i c g}
- Miscophus italicus A. Costa, 1867^{i c g}
- Miscophus johni Mokrousov, 2004^{i c g}
- Miscophus kansensis (Slansky, 1969)^{i c g}
- Miscophus karrooensis Arnold, 1923^{i c g}
- Miscophus kohlii Brauns, 1899^{i c g}
- Miscophus kriechbaumeri Brauns, 1899^{i c g}
- Miscophus krunki Lomholdt, 1985^{i c g}
- Miscophus laticeps (Ashmead, 1898)^{i c g}
- Miscophus levantinus Balthasar, 1954^{i c g}
- Miscophus lissonotus Lomholdt, 1985^{i c g}
- Miscophus littoreus de Andrade, 1960^{i c g}
- Miscophus luctuosus de Andrade, 1960^{i c g}
- Miscophus lugubris Arnold, 1929^{i c g}
- Miscophus lusitanicus de Andrade, 1952^{i c g}
- Miscophus maculipes Arnold, 1945^{i c g}
- Miscophus magnus Kazenas, 1992^{i c g}
- Miscophus maurus (Rohwer, 1909)^{i c g}
- Miscophus mavromoustakisi de Andrade, 1953^{i c g}
- Miscophus merceti de Andrade, 1952^{i c g}
- Miscophus mimeticus Honoré, 1944^{i c g}
- Miscophus minutus de Andrade, 1953^{i c g}
- Miscophus mochii Arnold, 1940^{i c g}
- Miscophus modestus Arnold, 1929^{i c g}
- Miscophus mongolicus Tsuneki, 1972^{i c g}
- Miscophus montanus Gussakovskij, 1935^{i c g}
- Miscophus nevesi de Andrade, 1952^{i c g}
- Miscophus nicolai Ferton, 1896^{i c g}
- Miscophus niger Dahlbom, 1844^{i c g}
- Miscophus nigrescens (Rohwer, 1909)^{i c g}
- Miscophus nigricans Cameron, 1907^{i c g}
- Miscophus nigriceps (Rohwer, 1911)^{i c g}
- Miscophus nigripes Honoré, 1944^{i c g}
- Miscophus nigriventris Kazenas, 1992^{i c g}
- Miscophus niloticus Honoré, 1944^{i c g}
- Miscophus nitidior de Beaumont, 1968^{i c g}
- Miscophus nobilis de Andrade, 1960^{i c g}
- Miscophus numidus de Beaumont, 1968^{i c g}
- Miscophus obscuritarsis Pulawski, 1964^{i c g}
- Miscophus occidentalis de Andrade, 1960^{i c g}
- Miscophus oraniensis Brauns, 1906^{i c g}
- Miscophus othello Balthasar, 1954^{i c g}
- Miscophus paolorosai Schmid-Egger, 2011^{i c g}
- Miscophus papyrus de Andrade, 1954^{i c g}
- Miscophus pardoi de Andrade, 1954^{i c g}
- Miscophus percitus Mokrousov, 2004^{i c g}
- Miscophus pharaonis Arnold, 1940^{i c g}
- Miscophus portoi de Andrade, 1956^{i c g}
- Miscophus postumus Bischoff, 1921^{i c g}
- Miscophus pretiosus Kohl, 1884^{i c g}
- Miscophus primogeniti de Andrade, 1954^{i c g}
- Miscophus pseudochrysis (Simon Thomas, 1995)^{i c g}
- Miscophus pseudomimeticus de Andrade, 1960^{i c g}
- Miscophus pseudonotogonia Brauns, 1899^{i c g}
- Miscophus pulcher de Andrade, 1953^{i c g}
- Miscophus pulcherrimus Lomholdt, 1985^{i c g}
- Miscophus punctatissimus Lomholdt, 1985^{i c g}
- Miscophus punicus de Andrade, 1954^{i c g}
- Miscophus quettaensis Nurse, 1903^{i c g}
- Miscophus rasilis Kazenas, 1993^{i c g}
- Miscophus repetekus Kazenas, 1993^{i c g}
- Miscophus reticulatus Schmid-Egger, 2014^{i g}
- Miscophus rothneyi Bingham, 1897^{i c g}
- Miscophus rufigaster Simon Thomas, 1995^{i c g}
- Miscophus rufiventris Tsuneki, 1972^{i c g}
- Miscophus sabulosus Lomholdt, 1985^{i c g}
- Miscophus sallitus de Andrade, 1960^{i c g}
- Miscophus scintillans de Andrade, 1956^{i c g}
- Miscophus sericeus Radoszkowski, 1876^{i c g}
- Miscophus seyrigi Arnold, 1945^{i c g}
- Miscophus similis F. Morawitz, 1897^{i c g}
- Miscophus sirius de Andrade, 1956^{i c g}
- Miscophus slossonae (Ashmead in Kohl, 1897)^{i c g}
- Miscophus soikai de Beaumont, 1952^{i c g}
- Miscophus sordidatus Arnold, 1945^{i c g}
- Miscophus specularis de Andrade, 1960^{i c g}
- Miscophus spinifer Lomholdt, 1985^{i c g}
- Miscophus spurius (Dahlbom, 1832)^{i c g}
- Miscophus stevensoni Arnold, 1923^{i c g}
- Miscophus susterai Balthasar, 1954^{i c g}
- Miscophus syriacus de Andrade, 1960^{i c g}
- Miscophus tagiurae de Andrade, 1954^{i c g}
- Miscophus temperatus Balthasar, 1954^{i c g}
- Miscophus texanus (Ashmead, 1898)^{i c g}
- Miscophus timberlakei (Bridwell, 1920)^{i c g}
- Miscophus tinctus de Andrade, 1956^{i c g}
- Miscophus transcaspicus de Andrade, 1960^{i c g}
- Miscophus tricolor Kazenas, 1992^{i c g}
- Miscophus tshardarensis Kazenas, 1992^{i c g}
- Miscophus turanicus Kazenas, 1992^{i c g}
- Miscophus turkmenicus Kazenas, 1993^{i c g}
- Miscophus turneri Lomholdt, 1985^{i c g}
- Miscophus unigena Balthasar, 1954^{i c g}
- Miscophus venustus de Beaumont, 1969^{i c g}
- Miscophus verecundus Arnold, 1924^{i c g}
- Miscophus verhoeffi de Andrade, 1952^{i c g}
- Miscophus wieringi Simon Thomas, 1995^{i c g}
- Miscophus yermasoyensis Balthasar, 1954^{i c g}
- Miscophus zakakiensis Balthasar, 1954^{i c g}
- Miscophus zergericus Kazenas, 1993^{i c g}

Data sources: i = ITIS, c = Catalogue of Life, g = GBIF, b = Bugguide.net
