= Seked =

Ancient Egyptian unit of measurement

Illustration of the ancient Egyptian measure of Seked compared with the slope of the Great Pyramid

Seked (or seqed) is an ancient Egyptian term describing the inclination of the triangular faces of a right pyramid. The system was based on the Egyptians' length measure known as the royal cubit. It was subdivided into seven palms, each of which was sub-divided into four digits.

The inclination of measured slopes was therefore expressed as the number of horizontal palms and digits relative to each royal cubit rise.

The seked is proportional to the reciprocal of our modern measure of slope or gradient, and to the cotangent of the angle of elevation. Specifically, if s is the seked, m the slope (rise over run), and $\phi$ the angle of elevation from horizontal, then:

$$s = \frac{7}{m} = 7\cot(\phi).$$

The most famous example of a seked slope is of the Great Pyramid of Giza in Egypt built around 2550 BC. Based on modern surveys, the faces of this monument had a seked of 5 1/2, or 5 palms and 2 digits, in modern terms equivalent to a slope of 1.27, a gradient of 127%, and an elevation of 51.84° from the horizontal (in our 360° system).

== Overview ==
Information on the use of the seked in the design of pyramids has been obtained from two mathematical papyri: the Rhind Mathematical Papyrus in the British Museum and the Moscow Mathematical Papyrus in the Museum of Fine Arts.

Although there is no direct evidence of its application from the archaeology of the Old Kingdom, there are a number of examples from the two mathematical papyri, which date to the Middle Kingdom that show the use of this system for defining the slopes of the sides of pyramids, based on their height and base dimensions. The most widely quoted example is perhaps problem 56 from the Rhind Mathematical Papyrus.

The most famous of all the pyramids of Egypt is the Great Pyramid of Giza built around 2550 BC. Based on the surveys of this structure that have been carried out by Flinders Petrie and others, the slopes of the faces of this monument were a seked of 5 1/2, or 5 palms and 2 digits [see figure above] which equates to a slope of 51.84° from the horizontal, using the modern 360° system.

This slope would probably have been accurately applied during construction by way of 'A frame' shaped wooden tools with plumb bobs, marked to the correct incline, so that slopes could be measured out and checked efficiently.

Furthermore, according to Petrie's survey data in "The Pyramids and Temples of Gizeh" the mean slope of the Great Pyramid's entrance passage is 26° 31' 23" ± 5". This is less than 1/20 of one degree in deviation from an ideal slope of 1 in 2, which is 26° 33' 54". This equates to a seked of 14 palms, and is generally considered to have been the intentional designed slope applied by the Old Kingdom builders for internal passages.

== Pyramid slopes ==
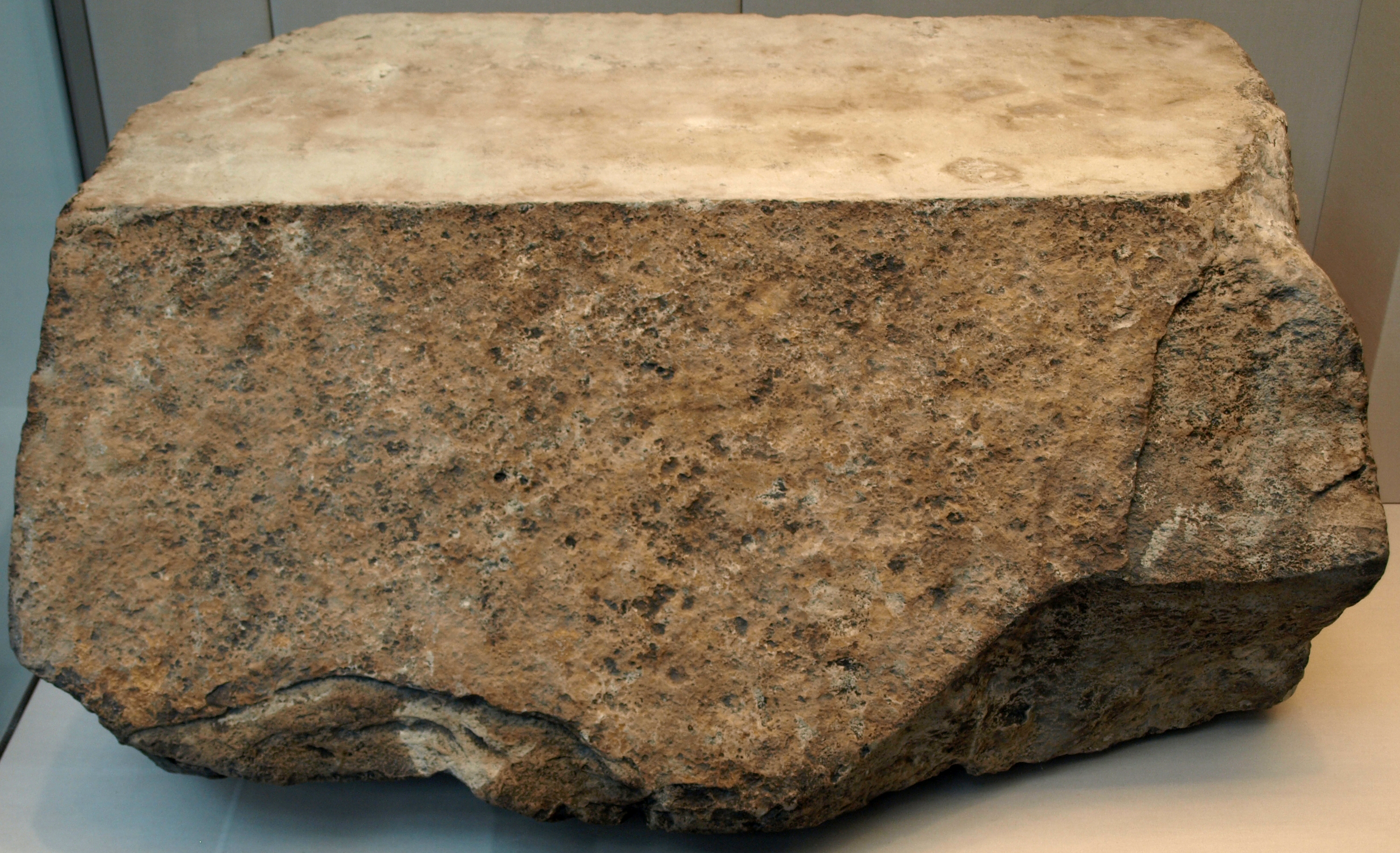
Casing stone from the Great Pyramid

The seked of a pyramid is described by Richard Gillings in his book 'Mathematics in the Time of the Pharaohs' as follows:

The seked of a right pyramid is the inclination of any one of the four triangular faces to the horizontal plane of its base, and is measured as so many horizontal units per one vertical unit rise. It is thus a measure equivalent to our modern cotangent of the angle of slope. In general, the seked of a pyramid is a kind of fraction, given as so many palms horizontally for each cubit of vertically, where 7 palms = 1 cubit. The Egyptian word 'seked' is thus related [in meaning, not origin] to our modern word 'gradient'.

Many of the smaller pyramids in Egypt have varying slopes; however, like the Great Pyramid of Giza, the pyramid at Meidum is thought to have had sides that sloped by 51.842° or 51° 50' 35", which is a seked of 5 1/2 palms.

The Great Pyramid scholar Professor I E S Edwards considered this to have been the 'normal' or most typical slope choice for pyramids. Flinders Petrie also noted the similarity of the slope of this pyramid to that of the Great Pyramid at Giza, and both Egyptologists considered it to have been a deliberate choice, based on a desire to ensure that the circuit of the base of the pyramids precisely equalled the circumference of a circle that would be swept out if the pyramid's height were used as a radius. Petrie wrote "...these relations of areas and of circular ratio are so systematic that we should grant that they were in the builder's design".

Slopes of edges are simpler ratios than slopes of faces.

== See also ==
- Triangulation
