= Aha (wasp) =

Scientific classification
- Kingdom: Animalia
- Phylum: Arthropoda
- Clade: Pancrustacea
- Class: Insecta
- Order: Hymenoptera
- Family: Crabronidae
- Subfamily: Crabroninae
- Tribe: Miscophini
- Genus: Aha; Menke, 1977

Type species
- Aha ha Menke, 1977

Species
- A. ha Menke, 1977; A. evansi Menke, 1977
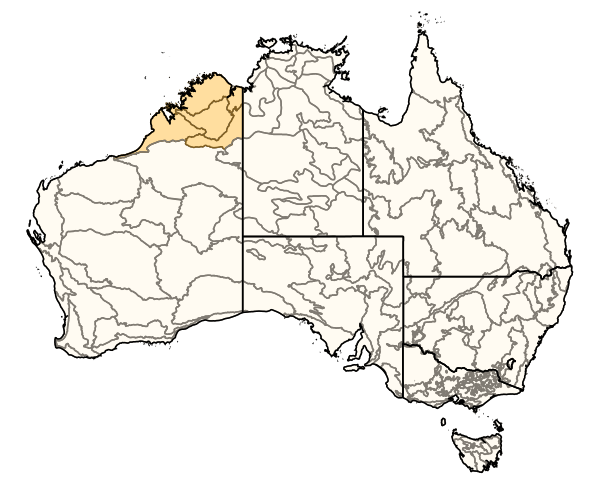
- A. ha distribution
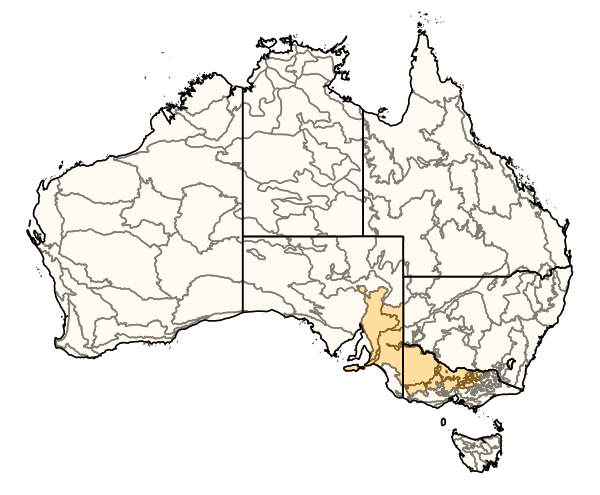
- A. evansi distribution

Genus of wasps

Aha is a genus of wasp. As of 2017, it consists of two species: A. ha, and A. evansi, and is endemic to Australia. The American entomologist Arnold S. Menke named and circumscribed the genus in 1977 for his newly-described species A. ha and A. evansi.

== Taxonomic history ==
In 1977, the American entomologist Arnold S. Menke wrote a paper circumscribing the new genus Aha which was accompanied by his descriptions of its two species: A. ha and A. evansi. Howard Ensign Evans and Robert Matthews had provided him with specimens of this new genus; they had collected them during expeditions in Australia in 1969–1970 and 1972. Menke designated A. ha to be the genus's type species. Menke only had access to male specimens when writing his description of the genus and both species. Ole C. Lomholdt wrote a description of the female A. evansi in 1980.

When Menke named Aha, he placed it in the tribe Miscophini due to its ocelli. Lomholdt argued the genus should be in the tribe Larrini. As of 2017, Aha is classified in the Miscophini tribe, of the Crabroninae subfamily of the Crabronidae family.

=== Etymology ===
The etymology listed in Menke's 1977 paper is that "Aha is an arbitrary combination of letters chosen for brevity". He later stated his first reaction when seeing one of these new specimens was "Aha, a new genus", making use of the English interjection aha. Due to its name, it has appeared in various lists and articles on interesting or humorous taxon names. Richard Conniff wrote an article for the magazine Science 82 discussing scientific names for taxa; he ended it with a paragraph on what he called "the topper", discussing the genus Aha. In 1993, Aha was both included in a list authored by Menke of animal taxa names he considered "funny" or "curious" and in an article by May Berenbaum in American Entomologist on creative names for insect taxa.

== Distribution ==
A. ha's type locality is in Kununurra, Western Australia; all specimens in the type series were found in the same area. The type locality for A. evansi is about 12–21 miles (19–34 km) north of Ouyen, Victoria. Additional specimens were found 15–20 miles (24–32 km) south of Ouyen and 4 miles (6.4 km) south of Sherlock, South Australia.

== Description ==
Lomholdt listed six autapomorphic features of the genus. Both sexes have outer claws which are much bigger than their inner claws. They have a compressed labio-maxillairy complex. Aha neither have volsella nor do they have aedeagal teeth. The genus is also characterized by a medial sulcus on its pronotal collar. The media on its forewing diverges proximally to the cu-a cross-vein.

In Menke's key to genera in Miscophini, Aha was coupled with Lyroda. His diagnostic features included the placement of the forewing media divergence, a prementum which was compressed laterally, and claws of unequal sizes.
