= Plenoculus =

Scientific classification
- Kingdom: Animalia
- Phylum: Arthropoda
- Class: Insecta
- Order: Hymenoptera
- Family: Crabronidae
- Subfamily: Crabroninae
- Tribe: Miscophini
- Genus: Plenoculus; W. Fox, 1893

Synonyms
- Pavlovskia Gussakovskij, 1935; Ptygosphex Gussakovskij, 1928

Genus of wasps

Plenoculus is a genus of square-headed wasps in the family Crabronidae. There are more than 20 described species in Plenoculus.

== Species ==
These 21 species belong to the genus Plenoculus:

- Plenoculus beaumonti de Andrade, 1957
- Plenoculus boharti F. Williams, 1960
- Plenoculus boregensis F. Williams, 1960
- Plenoculus cockerellii W. Fox, 1894
- Plenoculus cuneatus F. Williams, 1960
- Plenoculus davisi W. Fox, 1893
- Plenoculus deserti F. Williams, 1960
- Plenoculus fremonti Parker in Parker & Griswold, 1984
- Plenoculus gillaspyi Krombein, 1938
- Plenoculus hurdi F. Williams, 1960
- Plenoculus mexicanus F. Williams, 1960
- Plenoculus murgabensis (Gussakovskij, 1928)
- Plenoculus palmarum F. Williams, 1960
- Plenoculus parvus W. Fox, 1897
- Plenoculus platycerus Menke, 1968
- Plenoculus propinquus W. Fox, 1894
- Plenoculus sinuatus F. Williams, 1960
- Plenoculus stygius F. Williams, 1960
- Plenoculus timberlakei F. Williams, 1960
- Plenoculus ute Griswold in Parker & Griswold, 1984
- Plenoculus vanharteni Schmid-Egger, 2011
