= Aahaa =

Aahaa or Aahaa..! may refer to:

- Aahaa..! (1997 film), Indian Tamil-language film
- Aahaa..! (1998 film), Indian Telugu-language film

== See also ==
- AAHA (disambiguation)
- AHA (disambiguation)
- Aha! (disambiguation)
