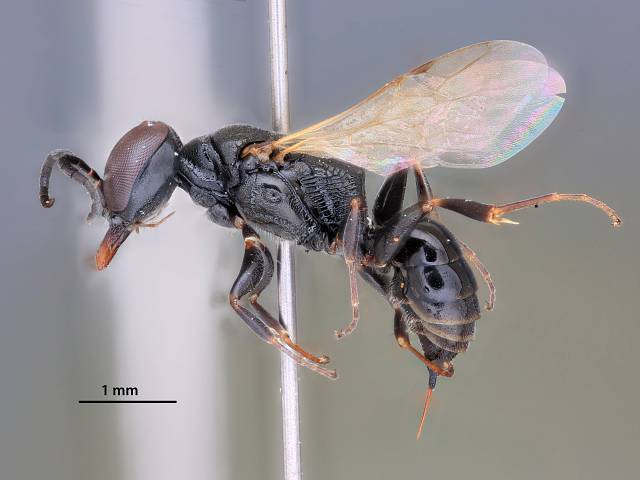
- Nitela Philippinica

Scientific classification
- Kingdom: Animalia
- Phylum: Arthropoda
- Class: Insecta
- Order: Hymenoptera
- Family: Crabronidae
- Tribe: Miscophini
- Genus: Nitela; Latreille, 1809

= Nitela =

Genus of wasps

Nitela is a genus of wasps belonging to the family Crabronidae.

The genus has cosmopolitan distribution.

Species:

- Nitela amazonica Ducke, 1903
- Nitela apoensis Tsuneki, 1992
