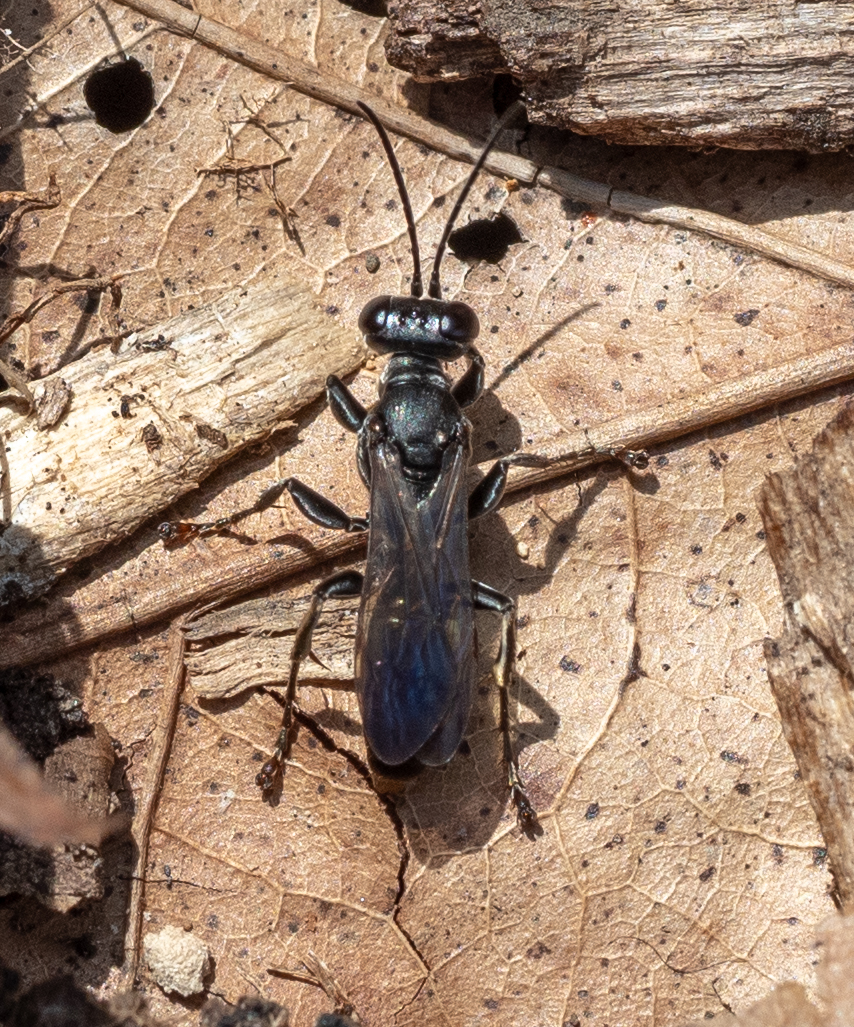
- L. subita in Brooklyn, New York

Scientific classification
- Domain: Eukaryota
- Kingdom: Animalia
- Phylum: Arthropoda
- Class: Insecta
- Order: Hymenoptera
- Family: Crabronidae
- Genus: Lyroda
- Species: L. subita

Binomial name
- Lyroda subita Say, 1837

Synonyms
- Larra arcuata (F. Smith, 1856); Larrada arcuata F. Smith, 1856; Lyroda cockerelli Rohwer, 1909; Tachysphex arcuatus (F. Smith, 1856)

= Lyroda subita =

Species of wasp

Lyroda subita is a species of square-headed wasp in the family Crabronidae. It is found in North America.
