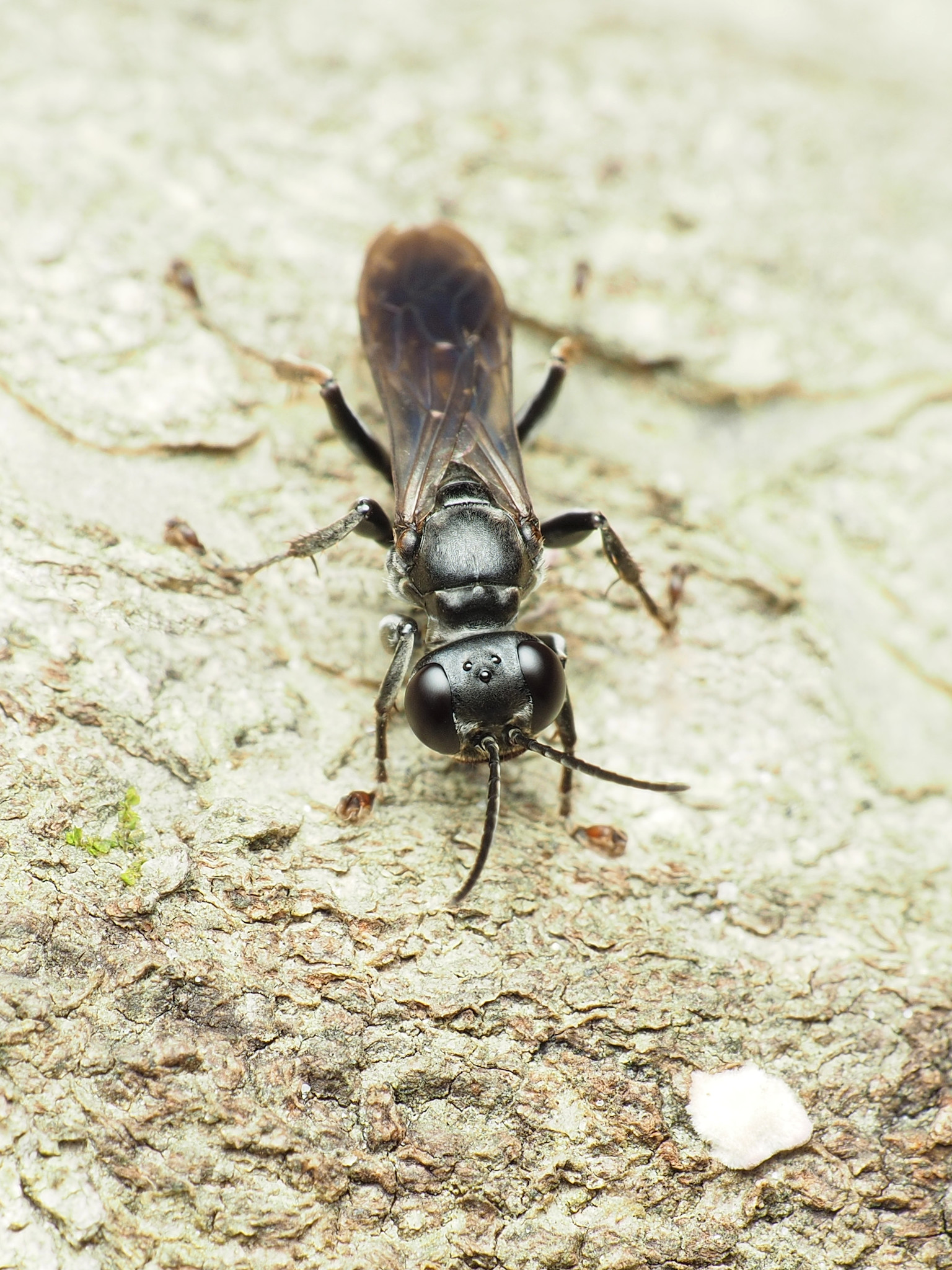
- Lyroda subita

Scientific classification
- Kingdom: Animalia
- Phylum: Arthropoda
- Clade: Pancrustacea
- Class: Insecta
- Order: Hymenoptera
- Family: Crabronidae
- Subfamily: Crabroninae
- Tribe: Miscophini
- Genus: Lyroda; Say, 1837

Synonyms
- Morphota F. Smith, 1856; Odontolarra Cameron, 1900

= Lyroda =

Genus of wasps

Lyroda is a genus of square-headed wasps that belongs to the family Crabronidae. There are more than 30 described species in Lyroda.

== Species ==
The genus Lyroda contains around 30 extant species. They are listed below:

- Lyroda aethiopica Kohl, 1894
- Lyroda alaminos Tsuneki, 1983
- Lyroda argenteofacialis (Cameron, 1889)
- Lyroda aurea Mawadda and Girish Kumar, 2021
- Lyroda binghami Tsuneki, 1983
- Lyroda centralafricana Schmid-Egger and Al-Jahdhami, 2021
- Lyroda concinna (F. Smith, 1856)
- Lyroda curvicarina Li & Li, 2026
- Lyroda errans (R. Turner, 1936)
- Lyroda fasciata (F. Smith, 1856)
- Lyroda formosa (F. Smith, 1858)
- Lyroda fukuiensis Tsuneki, 1983
- Lyroda laguna Tsuneki, 1983
- Lyroda madecassa Arnold, 1945
- Lyroda michaelseni W. Schulz, 1908
- Lyroda minima R. Turner, 1936
- Lyroda multidentis Li & Li, 2026
- Lyroda nigra (Cameron, 1904)
- Lyroda nuda Mawadda and Girish Kumar, 2021
- Lyroda philippinica Tsuneki, 1983
- Lyroda quadratidens Li & Li, 2026
- Lyroda queenslandensis R. Turner, 1916
- Lyroda retirugosa Li & Li, 2026
- Lyroda salai Giner Marí, 1945
- Lyroda salalah Schmid-Egger and Al-Jahdhami, 2021
- Lyroda subita Say, 1837
- Lyroda tridentata T. Li, W. Cai & Q. Li, 2009
- Lyroda triloba Say, 1837
- Lyroda venusta Bingham, 1897
- Lyroda williamsi Tsuneki, 1983
