= Aha ha =

Scientific classification
- Kingdom: Animalia
- Phylum: Arthropoda
- Clade: Pancrustacea
- Class: Insecta
- Order: Hymenoptera
- Family: Crabronidae
- Genus: Aha
- Species: A. ha

Binomial name
- Aha ha Menke, 1977
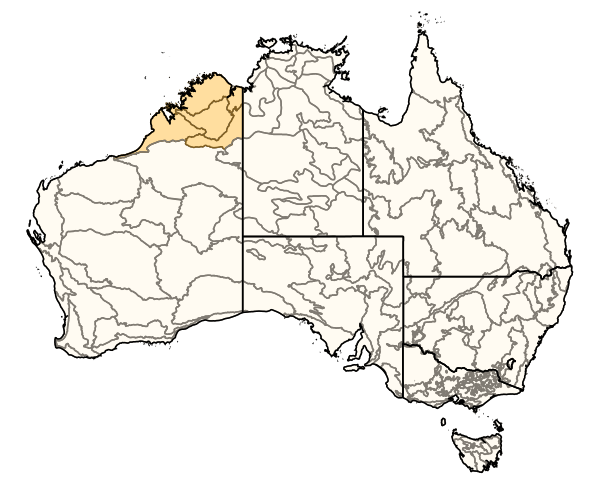
- A. ha distribution

Species of wasp

Aha ha is a species of Australian wasp, named by the entomologist Arnold Menke in 1977 as a joke. Menke described several years after its discovery how, when he received a package from a colleague containing insect specimens, he exclaimed "Aha, a new genus", with fellow entomologist Eric Grissell responding "ha" doubtfully. This incident took place on 16 September 1972. The name of the insect is commonly found in lists of bizarre scientific names. The name was also used as the vehicle registration plate of Menke's car, "AHA HA".

== See also ==
- List of short species names
