= American Amputee Hockey Association =

The American Amputee Hockey Association (AAHA) is a non-profit sports organization founded in 2000 to develop opportunities for amputee and other disabled athletes to learn and play competitive hockey. The AAHA is a member of the Disabled Hockey Section of USA Hockey and is working to promote a fun and safe environment for the growth of hockey in the United States and to lead the international effort to make Standing (Amputee) Hockey a Winter Paralympic Sport.

Amputee Hockey is identical to typical amateur ice hockey, with the notable exception that the athletes are missing one or more of their upper or lower extremities. Competing with other amputees helps to increase self-esteem through participation in a fast-paced, exciting sport on a "level playing field", the hockey rink. Our motto "put your disability on ice" is designed to inspire amputees and other athletes to look beyond impairment and disability toward participation and improved performance in a competitive team sport.

== History ==
In May 2000, six US amputee skaters responded to an invitation to go to St. Petersburg, Russia to play an exhibition match against a group of Russian amputees during the World Ice Hockey Championship. Upon their successful return, the AAHA was formed. AAHA members began the effort to find, recruit and train amputee skaters throughout the US and Canada. In January 2001, the first Amputee Hockey Game was played in Saranac Lake, NY. In March 2002, Team USA played Team Canada in the silver medal game during the Winter Paralympic Games in Salt Lake City. In April 2002 the first World Amputee Hockey Championship was held in Finland with teams from Canada, Finland, Russia, and the United States.

- Team Canada
- Team Russia
- Finnish Amputee Hockey Team
- Czech Republic National Team
- Team Latvia
