= Aha! (company) =

American software company

- Aha! logo
- Type: Private
- Traded as: 747773000RC0001
- Industry: Software
- Founded: 2013
- Headquarters: Menlo Park, California
- Area served: Global
- Key people: Brian de Haaff (CEO); Chris Waters (CTO)
- Website: www.aha.io

Aha! is a cloud-based software company that provides product management software for companies in the United States and internationally. Aha! offers Software-as-a-Service (SaaS) products for organizations to set strategy, ideate, plan, showcase, build, and launch new products and enhancements.

The Aha! suite of products cater to Product managers (PMs), engineers, and product development teams involved in innovation management programs, portfolio management, product marketing, and operations. These tools aim to streamline the process of bringing ideas from concept to market, helping product builders go from discovery to delivery.

As of 2024, more than one million product builders reportedly use the Aha! suite of products.

== Capabilities ==
Aha! is a software suite designed to support users in their approach to developing and delivering products and services. The suite includes Aha! Roadmaps, Aha! Discovery, Aha! Ideas, Aha! Whiteboards, Aha! Builder, Aha! Develop, Aha! Teamwork, and Aha! Knowledge.

Aha! offers integration with Jira, GitHub, Azure DevOps Server, Pivotal Tracker, Trello, FogBugz, Jellyfish, Redmine, Zendesk, Salesforce, Google Analytics, and Slack and has a rest-based API.

They also offer mobile applications for iPhone and Android and are partners with Microsoft, GitHub and HP.

== History ==
Aha! is a self-funded, private company, founded by Brian de Haaff and Dr. Chris Waters in 2013 in Menlo Park, California. They have no centralized headquarters, and employees work remotely from the United States and some international locations.

In 2017, Aha! co-founder and CEO Brian de Haaff released the book Lovability, sharing his philosophy on building businesses and products.

In 2019 and 2020, Aha! expanded their road-mapping software to target marketing, IT, services, project management, and business operations users.

In October 2020, Aha! launched Aha! Ideas, aiming to give teams a way to crowdsource ideas from customers, employees, and partners into their product plans. In May 2021, the company released Aha! Develop, a development tool for engineering teams.

In 2022, Aha! introduced a digital notebook for product builders. Aha! Notebooks aims to give teams the ability to collaborate on documentation and concepts. The company also announced that they surpassed $100 million in annual recurring revenue (ARR) and launched The Bootstrap Movement.

In 2025, Aha! introduced a new way to manage customer interviews. Aha! Discovery helps product teams centralize meeting transcripts, uncover key product insights, and link them to a roadmap. The company also launched Aha! Teamwork, a flexible project management tool for teams to complete tasks and stay aligned with strategic plans.

In 2026, the company launched Aha! Builder to help companies plan, design, and develop custom software using AI.

Aha! claims to have donated more than $1.5 million through its philanthropic giving program, Aha! Cares.

== See also ==
- Software development
- Software engineering
- Software product management
