= Association of Hispanic Arts =

New York City-based non-profit organization

The Association of Hispanic Arts (AHA) is a New York–based non-profit organization founded in 1975 that promotes the work of Hispanic artists. It holds an annual Hispanic Arts Festival in the city, and publishes a quarterly magazine, AHA! Hispanic Arts News.

The organisation won a Mayor's Award of Honor for Arts and Culture from the Mayor of New York David Dinkins in 1992 for its counseling and advocacy of Hispanic artists. In 1995, the group picketed the opening of The Perez Family, a film about Cuban refugees whose cast was mostly non-Hispanic.

== See also ==
- Hispanic culture
