= Rhind Mathematical Papyrus =

Ancient Egyptian mathematical document

- British Museum, London
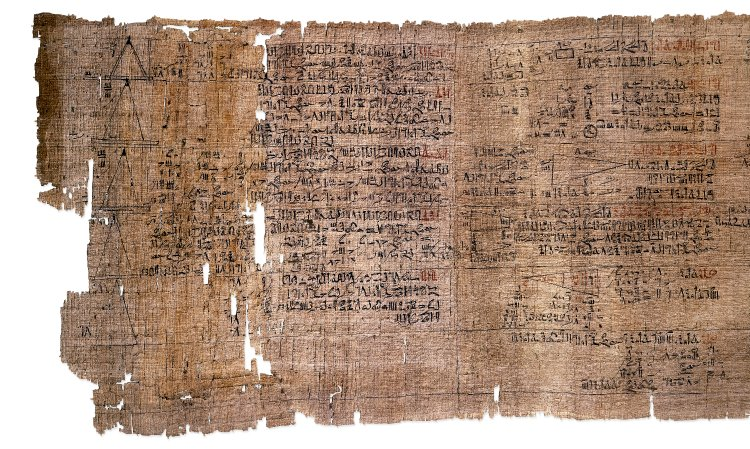
- A portion of the Rhind Papyrus
- Date: c. 1550 BC
- Place of origin: Thebes, Egypt
- Language: Egyptian (Hieratic)
- Scribe: Ahmes
- Material: Papyrus
- Size: First section (BM 10057 ): Length: 295.5 cm (116.3 in); Width: 32 cm (13 in); Second section (BM 10058 ): Length: 199.5 cm (78.5 in); Width: 32 cm (13 in)

The Rhind Mathematical Papyrus (RMP; also designated as papyrus British Museum 10057, pBM 10058, and Brooklyn Museum 37.1784Ea-b) is one of the best known examples of ancient Egyptian mathematics.

It is one of two well-known mathematical papyri, along with the Moscow Mathematical Papyrus. The Rhind Papyrus is the larger, but younger, of the two, having been written in the Fifteenth Dynasty during the late Second Intermediate Period.

In the papyrus' opening paragraphs, Ahmes presents the papyrus as giving "Accurate reckoning for inquiring into things, and the knowledge of all things, mysteries ... all secrets". He continues:

This book was copied in regnal year 33, month 4 of Akhet, under the majesty of the King of Upper and Lower Egypt, Awserre, given life, from an ancient copy made in the time of the King of Upper and Lower Egypt Nimaatre. The scribe Ahmose writes this copy.

The name Awserre was the prenomen of the Hyksos king Apepi. The name Nimaatre mentioned was the prenomen of pharaoh Amenemhat III of the Twelfth Dynasty of the Middle Kingdom.

Several books and articles about the Rhind Mathematical Papyrus have been published, and a handful of these stand out. The Rhind Papyrus was published in 1923 by the English Egyptologist T. Eric Peet and contains a discussion of the text that followed Francis Llewellyn Griffith's Book I, II and III outline. Arnold Buffum Chace published a compendium in 1927–1929 which included photographs of the text. A more recent overview of the Rhind Papyrus was published in 1987 by Robins and Shute.

The Rhind Mathematical Papyrus contains on its verso or back another regnal year with this important entry:

Regnal Year 11, second month of Shemu, Heliopolis was entered. First month of Akhet, day 23, "he of the South" broke into Tjaru [Greek Sile, modern Tell El-Hebwa],

Both the Egyptologists Thomas Schneider and Irene Forstner-Mueller agree that the "He of the South" must refer to the Theban king Ahmose I. As Thomas Schneider writes:

"Since "he of the South" must denote the Theban ruler Ahmose, the regnal year 11 can only be assigned to the successor of the Hyksos king Apepi: Khamudi. The Hyksos capital Avaris will have fallen to Ahmose not much later."

== History ==
The Rhind Mathematical Papyrus dates to the Second Intermediate Period of Egypt. It was copied by the scribe Ahmes (i.e., Ahmose; Ahmes is an older transcription favoured by historians of mathematics) from a now-lost text from the reign of the 12th dynasty king Amenemhat III.

It dates to around 1550 BC. The document is dated to Year 33 of the Hyksos king Apophis and also contains a separate later historical note on its verso likely dating from "Year 11" of his successor, Khamudi.

Alexander Henry Rhind, a Scottish antiquarian, purchased two parts of the papyrus in 1858 in Luxor, Egypt; it was stated to have been found in "one of the small buildings near the Ramesseum", near Luxor.

The British Museum, where the majority of the papyrus is now kept, acquired it in 1865 along with the Egyptian Mathematical Leather Roll, also owned by Henry Rhind.

Fragments of the text were independently purchased in Luxor by American Egyptologist Edwin Smith in the mid 1860s, were donated by his daughter in 1906 to the New York Historical Society, and are now held by the Brooklyn Museum. An 18 cm (7.1 in) central section is missing.

The papyrus began to be transliterated and mathematically translated in the late 19th century. The mathematical-translation aspect remains incomplete in several respects.

== Books ==
=== Book I – Arithmetic and Algebra ===
The first part of the Rhind papyrus consists of reference tables and a collection of 21 arithmetic and 20 algebraic problems. The problems start out with simple fractional expressions, followed by completion (sekem) problems and more involved linear equations (aha problems).

The first part of the papyrus is taken up by the 2/n table. The fractions 2/n for odd n ranging from 3 to 101 are expressed as sums of unit fractions. For example, $\frac{2}{15} = \frac{1}{10} + \frac{1}{30}$. The decomposition of 2/n into unit fractions is never more than 4 terms long as in for example:

$$\frac{2}{101} = \frac{1}{101} + \frac{1}{202} + \frac{1}{303} + \frac{1}{606}$$

This table is followed by a much smaller, tiny table of fractional expressions for the numbers 1 through 9 divided by 10. For instance the division of 7 by 10 is recorded as:

7 divided by 10 yields 2/3 + 1/30

After these two tables, the papyrus records 91 problems altogether, which have been designated by moderns as problems (or numbers) 1–87, including four other items which have been designated as problems 7B, 59B, 61B and 82B. Problems 1–7, 7B and 8–40 are concerned with arithmetic and elementary algebra.

Problems 1–6 compute divisions of a certain number of loaves of bread by 10 men and record the outcome in unit fractions. Problems 7–20 show how to multiply the expressions 1 + 1/2 + 1/4 = 7/4, and 1 + 2/3 + 1/3 = 2 by different fractions. Problems 21–23 are problems in completion, which in modern notation are simply subtraction problems. Problems 24–34 are ‘‘aha’’ problems; these are linear equations. Problem 32 for instance corresponds (in modern notation) to solving x + 1/3 x + 1/4 x = 2 for x. Problems 35–38 involve divisions of the heqat, which is an ancient Egyptian unit of volume. Beginning at this point, assorted units of measurement become much more important throughout the remainder of the papyrus, and indeed a major consideration throughout the rest of the papyrus is dimensional analysis. Problems 39 and 40 compute the division of loaves and use arithmetic progressions.

=== Book II – Geometry ===
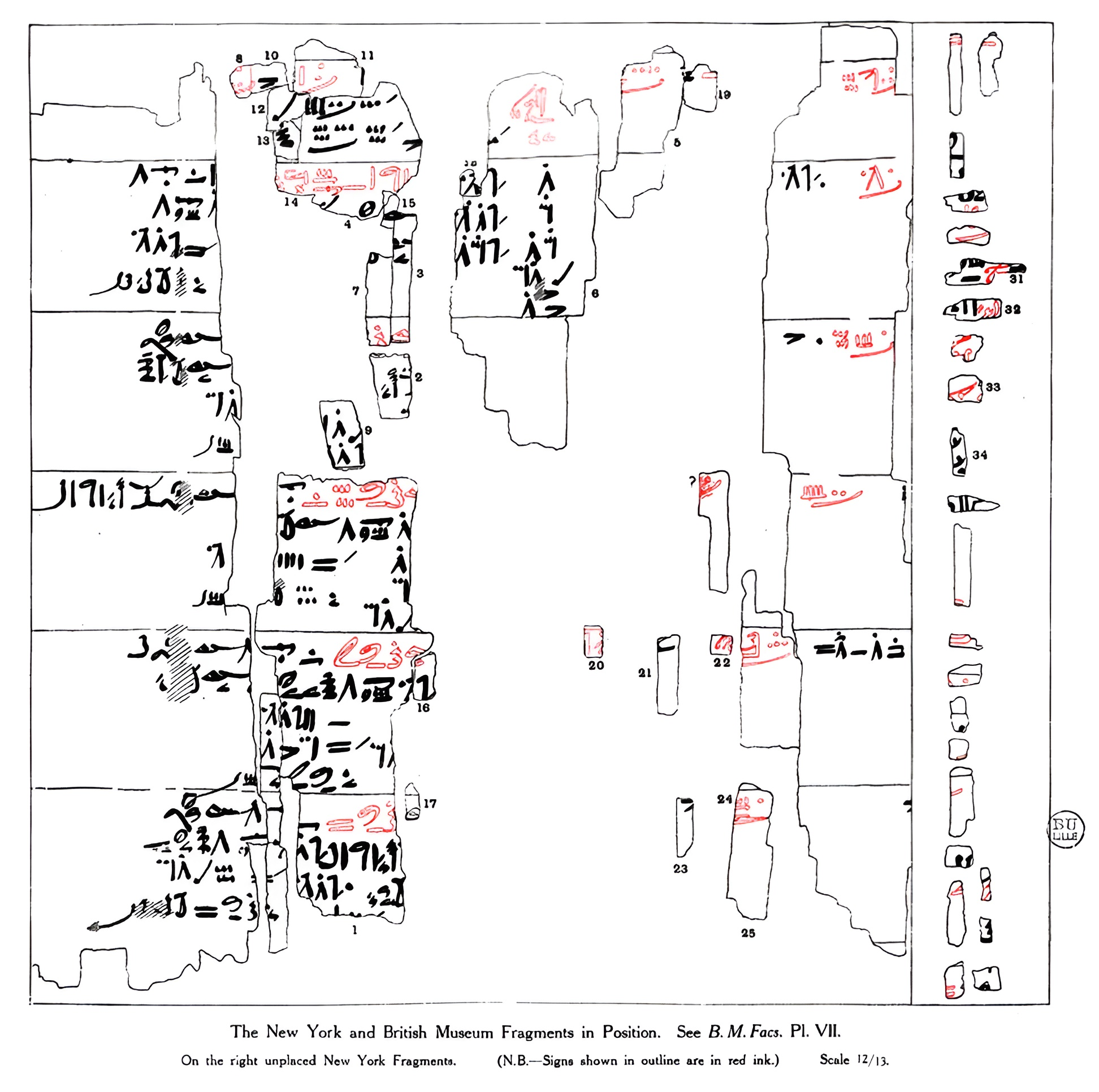
A portion of the Rhind Papyrus

The second part of the Rhind papyrus, being problems 41–59, 59B and 60, consists of geometry problems. Peet referred to these problems as "mensuration problems".

==== Volumes ====
Problems 41–46 show how to find the volume of both cylindrical and rectangular granaries. In problem 41 Ahmes computes the volume of a cylindrical granary. Given the diameter d and the height h, the volume V is given by:

$$V = \left[\right(1-1/9\left) d\right]^2 h$$

In modern mathematical notation (and using d = 2r) this gives $V = (8/9)^2 d^2 h = (256/81) r^2 h$. The fractional term 256/81 approximates the value of π as being 3.1605..., an error of less than one percent.

Problem 47 is a table with fractional equalities which represent the ten situations where the physical volume quantity of "100 quadruple heqats" is divided by each of the multiples of ten, from ten through one hundred. The quotients are expressed in terms of Horus eye fractions, sometimes also using a much smaller unit of volume known as a "quadruple ro". The quadruple heqat and the quadruple ro are units of volume derived from the simpler heqat and ro, such that these four units of volume satisfy the following relationships: 1 quadruple heqat = 4 heqat = 1,280 ro = 320 quadruple ro. Thus,

100/10 quadruple heqat = 10 quadruple heqat
100/20 quadruple heqat = 5 quadruple heqat
100/30 quadruple heqat = (3 + 1/4 + 1/16 + 1/64) quadruple heqat + (1 + 2/3) quadruple ro
100/40 quadruple heqat = (2 + 1/2) quadruple heqat
100/50 quadruple heqat = 2 quadruple heqat
100/60 quadruple heqat = (1 + 1/2 + 1/8 + 1/32) quadruple heqat + (3 + 1/3) quadruple ro
100/70 quadruple heqat = (1 + 1/4 + 1/8 + 1/32 + 1/64) quadruple heqat + (2 + 1/14 + 1/21 + 1/42) quadruple ro
100/80 quadruple heqat = (1 + 1/4) quadruple heqat
100/90 quadruple heqat = (1 + 1/16 + 1/32 + 1/64) quadruple heqat + (1/2 + 1/18) quadruple ro
100/100 quadruple heqat = 1 quadruple heqat

==== Areas ====
Problems 48–55 show how to compute an assortment of areas. Problem 48 is notable in that it succinctly computes the area of a circle by approximating π. Specifically, problem 48 explicitly reinforces the convention (used throughout the geometry section) that "a circle's area stands to that of its circumscribing square in the ratio 64/81." Equivalently, the papyrus approximates π as 256/81, as was already noted above in the explanation of problem 41.

Other problems show how to find the area of rectangles, triangles and trapezoids.

==== Pyramids ====
The final six problems are related to the slopes of pyramids. A seked problem is reported as follows:

If a pyramid is 250 cubits high and the side of its base 360 cubits long, what is its seked?"

The solution to the problem is given as the ratio of half the side of the base of the pyramid to its height, or the run-to-rise ratio of its face. In other words, the quantity found for the seked is the cotangent of the angle to the base of the pyramid and its face.

=== Book III – Miscellany ===
The third part of the Rhind papyrus consists of the remainder of the 91 problems, being 61, 61B, 62–82, 82B, 83–84, and "numbers" 85–87, which are items that are not mathematical in nature. This final section contains more complicated tables of data (which frequently involve Horus eye fractions), several pefsu problems which are elementary algebraic problems concerning food preparation, and even an amusing problem (79) which is suggestive of geometric progressions, geometric series, and certain later problems and riddles in history. Problem 79 explicitly cites, "seven houses, 49 cats, 343 mice, 2401 ears of spelt, 16807 hekats." In particular problem 79 concerns a situation in which 7 houses each contain seven cats, which all eat seven mice, each of which would have eaten seven ears of grain, each of which would have produced seven measures of grain. The third part of the Rhind papyrus is therefore a kind of miscellany, building on what has already been presented. Problem 61 is concerned with multiplications of fractions. Problem 61B, meanwhile, gives a general expression for computing 2/3 of 1/n, where n is odd. In modern notation the formula given is

$$\frac{2}{3n} = \frac{1}{2n} + \frac{1}{6n}$$

The technique given in 61B is closely related to the derivation of the 2/n table.

Problems 62–68 are general problems of an algebraic nature. Problems 69–78 are all pefsu problems in some form or another. They involve computations regarding the strength of bread and beer, with respect to certain raw materials used in their production.

Problem 79 sums five terms in a geometric progression. Its language is strongly suggestive of the more modern riddle and nursery rhyme "As I was going to St Ives". Problems 80 and 81 compute Horus eye fractions of hinu (or heqats). The last four mathematical items, problems 82, 82B and 83–84, compute the amount of feed necessary for various animals, such as fowl and oxen. However, these problems, especially 84, are plagued by pervasive ambiguity, confusion, and simple inaccuracy.

The final three items on the Rhind papyrus are designated as "numbers" 85–87, as opposed to "problems", and they are scattered widely across the papyrus's back side, or verso. They are, respectively, a small phrase which ends the document (and has a few possibilities for translation, given below), a piece of scrap paper unrelated to the body of the document, used to hold it together (yet containing words and Egyptian fractions which are by now familiar to a reader of the document), and a small historical note which is thought to have been written some time after the completion of the body of the papyrus's writing. This note is thought to describe events during the "Hyksos domination", a period of external interruption in ancient Egyptian society which is closely related with its second intermediary period. With these non-mathematical yet historically and philologically intriguing errata, the papyrus's writing comes to an end.

== Unit concordance ==
Much of the Rhind Papyrus's material is concerned with Ancient Egyptian units of measurement and especially the dimensional analysis used to convert between them. A concordance of units of measurement used in the papyrus is given in the image.

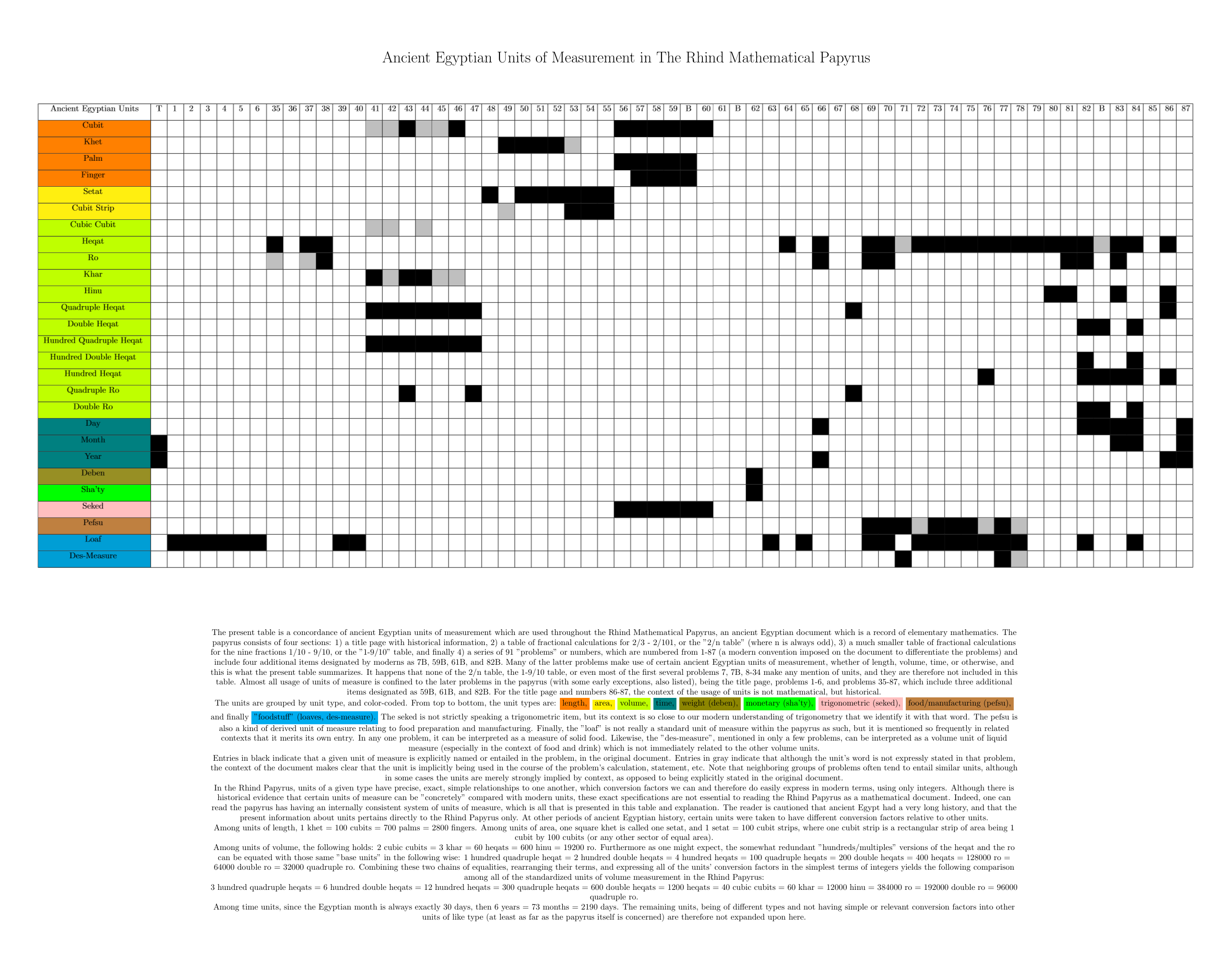
Units of measure used in the Rhind Papyrus

== Content ==
This table summarizes the content of the Rhind Papyrus by means of a concise modern paraphrase. It is based upon the two-volume exposition of the papyrus which was published by Arnold Buffum Chace in 1927, and in 1929. In general, the papyrus consists of four sections: a title page, the 2/n table, a tiny "1–9/10 table", and 91 problems, or "numbers". The latter are numbered from 1 through 87 and include four mathematical items which have been designated by moderns as problems 7B, 59B, 61B, and 82B. Numbers 85–87, meanwhile, are not mathematical items forming part of the body of the document, but instead are respectively: a small phrase ending the document, a piece of "scrap-paper" used to hold the document together (having already contained unrelated writing), and a historical note which is thought to describe a time period shortly after the completion of the body of the papyrus. These three latter items are written on disparate areas of the papyrus's verso (back side), far away from the mathematical content. Chace therefore differentiates them by styling them as numbers as opposed to problems, like the other 88 numbered items.

Section or problem numbers	Statement of problem, or description	Solution, or description	Notes
Title page	Ahmes identifies himself and his historical circumstances.	"Accurate reckoning. The entrance into the knowledge of all existing things and all obscure secrets. This book was copied in the year 33, in the fourth month of the inundation season, under the majesty of the king of Upper and Lower Egypt, 'A-user-Re', endowed with life, in likeness to writings of old made in the time of the king of Upper and Lower Egypt, Ne-ma'et-Re'. It is the scribe Ahmes who copies this writing."	It is clear from the title page that Ahmes identifies both his own period, as well as the period of an older text or texts from which he is supposed to have copied, thereby creating the Rhind Papyrus. The papyrus has material written on both sides—that is, its recto and verso. See the picture for details.
2/n Table	Express each of the quotients from 2/3 through 2/101 (where the denominator is always odd) as Egyptian fractions.	See the Rhind Mathematical Papyrus 2/n table article for summary and solutions of this section.	Throughout the papyrus, most solutions are given as particular Egyptian fractional representations of a given real number. However, since every positive rational number has infinitely many representations as an Egyptian fraction, these solutions are not unique. Also bear in mind that the fraction 2/3 is the single exception, used in addition to integers, that Ahmes uses alongside all (positive) rational unit fractions to express Egyptian fractions. The 2/n table can be said to partially follow an algorithm (see problem 61B) for expressing 2/n as an Egyptian fraction of 2 terms, when n is composite. However, this fledgling algorithm is cast aside in many situations when n is prime. The method of solutions for the 2/n table, therefore, also suggests beginnings of number theory, and not merely arithmetic.
1–9/10 Table	Write the quotients from 1/10 through 9/10 as Egyptian fractions.	$\frac{1}{10} = \frac{1}{10} \;\;\; ; \;\;\; \frac{2}{10} = \frac{1}{5} \;\;\; ; \;\;\; \frac{3}{10} = \frac{1}{5} + \frac{1}{10}$ $\frac{4}{10} = \frac{1}{3} + \frac{1}{15} \;\;\; ; \;\;\; \frac{5}{10} = \frac{1}{2} \;\;\; ; \;\;\; \frac{6}{10} = \frac{1}{2} + \frac{1}{10}$ $\frac{7}{10} = \frac{2}{3} + \frac{1}{30} \;\;\; ; \;\;\; \frac{8}{10} = \frac{2}{3} + \frac{1}{10} + \frac{1}{30} \;\;\; ; \;\;\; \frac{9}{10} = \frac{2}{3} + \frac{1}{5} + \frac{1}{30}$	
Problems 1–6	1, 2, 6, 7, 8 and 9 loaves of bread (respectively, in each problem) are divided among 10 men. In each case, represent each man's share of bread as an Egyptian fraction.	$\frac{1}{10} = \frac{1}{10} \;\;\; ; \;\;\; \frac{2}{10} = \frac{1}{5}$ $\frac{6}{10} = \frac{1}{2} + \frac{1}{10} \;\;\; ; \;\;\; \frac{7}{10} = \frac{2}{3} + \frac{1}{30}$ $\frac{8}{10} = \frac{2}{3} + \frac{1}{10} + \frac{1}{30} \;\;\; ; \;\;\; \frac{9}{10} = \frac{2}{3} + \frac{1}{5} + \frac{1}{30}$	The first six problems of the papyrus are simple repetitions of the information already written in the 1–9/10 table, now in the context of story problems.
7, 7B, 8–20	Let $S = 1 + 1/2 + 1/4 = \frac{7}{4}$ and $T = 1 + 2/3 + 1/3 = 2$. Then for the following multiplications, write the product as an Egyptian fraction.	$7: \bigg( \frac{1}{4} + \frac{1}{28} \bigg) S = \frac{1}{2} \;\;\; ; \;\;\; 7B: \bigg( \frac{1}{4} + \frac{1}{28} \bigg) S = \frac{1}{2} \;\;\; ; \;\;\; 8: \frac{1}{4} T = \frac{1}{2}$ $9: \bigg( \frac{1}{2} + \frac{1}{14} \bigg) S = 1 \;\;\; ; \;\;\; 10: \bigg( \frac{1}{4} + \frac{1}{28} \bigg) S = \frac{1}{2} \;\;\; ; \;\;\; 11: \frac{1}{7} S = \frac{1}{4}$ $12: \frac{1}{14} S = \frac{1}{8} \;\;\; ; \;\;\; 13: \bigg( \frac{1}{16} + \frac{1}{112} \bigg) S = \frac{1}{8} \;\;\; ; \;\;\; 14: \frac{1}{28} S = \frac{1}{16}$ $15: \bigg( \frac{1}{32} + \frac{1}{224} \bigg) S = \frac{1}{16} \;\;\; ; \;\;\; 16: \frac{1}{2} T = 1 \;\;\; ; \;\;\; 17: \frac{1}{3} T = \frac{2}{3}$ $18: \frac{1}{6} T = \frac{1}{3} \;\;\; ; \;\;\; 19: \frac{1}{12} T = \frac{1}{6} \;\;\; ; \;\;\; 20: \frac{1}{24} T = \frac{1}{12}$	The same two multiplicands (here denoted as S and T) are used incessantly throughout these problems. Ahmes effectively writes the same problem thrice over (7, 7B, 10), sometimes approaching the same problem with different arithmetic work.
21–38	For each of the following linear equations with variable $x$, solve for $x$ and express $x$ as an Egyptian fraction.	$21: \bigg( \frac{2}{3} + \frac{1}{15} \bigg) + x = 1 \;\;\; \rightarrow \;\;\; x = \frac{1}{5} + \frac{1}{15}$ $22: \bigg( \frac{2}{3} + \frac{1}{30} \bigg) + x = 1 \;\;\; \rightarrow \;\;\; x = \frac{1}{5} + \frac{1}{10}$ $23: \bigg( \frac{1}{4} + \frac{1}{8} + \frac{1}{10} + \frac{1}{30} + \frac{1}{45} \bigg) + x = \frac{2}{3} \;\;\; \rightarrow \;\;\; x = \frac{1}{9} + \frac{1}{40}$ $24: x + \frac{1}{7} x = 19 \;\;\; \rightarrow \;\;\; x = 16 + \frac{1}{2} + \frac{1}{8}$ $25: x + \frac{1}{2} x = 16 \;\;\; \rightarrow \;\;\; x = 10 + \frac{2}{3}$ $26: x + \frac{1}{4} x = 15 \;\;\; \rightarrow \;\;\; x = 12$ $27: x + \frac{1}{5} x = 21 \;\;\; \rightarrow \;\;\; x = 17 + \frac{1}{2}$ $28: \bigg( x + \frac{2}{3} x \bigg) - \frac{1}{3} \bigg( x + \frac{2}{3} x \bigg) = 10 \;\;\; \rightarrow \;\;\; x = 9$ $29: \frac{1}{3} \Bigg( \bigg( x + \frac{2}{3} x \bigg) + \frac{1}{3} \bigg( x + \frac{2}{3} x \bigg) \Bigg) = 10 \;\;\; \rightarrow \;\;\; x = 13 + \frac{1}{2}$ $30: \bigg( \frac{2}{3} + \frac{1}{10} \bigg) x = 10 \;\;\; \rightarrow \;\;\; x = 13 + \frac{1}{23}$ $31: x + \frac{2}{3} x + \frac{1}{2} x + \frac{1}{7} x = 33 \;\;\; \rightarrow$ $x = 14 + \frac{1}{4} + \frac{1}{56} + \frac{1}{97} + \frac{1}{194} + \frac{1}{388} + \frac{1}{679} + \frac{1}{776}$ $32: x + \frac{1}{3} x + \frac{1}{4} x = 2 \;\;\; \rightarrow \;\;\; x = 1 + \frac{1}{6} + \frac{1}{12} + \frac{1}{114} + \frac{1}{228}$ $33: x + \frac{2}{3} x + \frac{1}{2} x + \frac{1}{7} x = 37 \;\;\; \rightarrow \;\;\; x = 16 + \frac{1}{56} + \frac{1}{679} + \frac{1}{776}$ $34: x + \frac{1}{2} x + \frac{1}{4} x = 10 \;\;\; \rightarrow \;\;\; x = 5 + \frac{1}{2} + \frac{1}{7} + \frac{1}{14}$ $35: \bigg( 3 + \frac{1}{3} \bigg) x = 1 \;\;\; \rightarrow \;\;\; x = \frac{1}{5} + \frac{1}{10}$ $36: \bigg( 3 + \frac{1}{3} + \frac{1}{5} \bigg) x = 1 \;\;\; \rightarrow \;\;\; x = \frac{1}{4} + \frac{1}{53} + \frac{1}{106} + \frac{1}{212}$ $37: \bigg( 3 + \frac{1}{3} + \frac{1}{3} \cdot \frac{1}{3} + \frac{1}{9} \bigg) x = 1 \;\;\; \rightarrow \;\;\; x = \frac{1}{4} + \frac{1}{32}$ $38: \bigg( 3 + \frac{1}{7} \bigg) x = 1 \;\;\; \rightarrow \;\;\; x = \frac{1}{6} + \frac{1}{11} + \frac{1}{22} + \frac{1}{66}$	Problem 31 has an especially onerous solution. Although the statement of problems 21–38 can at times appear complicated (especially in Ahmes' prose), each problem ultimately reduces to a simple linear equation. In some cases, a unit of some kind has been omitted, being superfluous for these problems. These cases are problems 35–38, whose statements and "work" make the first mentions of units of volume known as a heqat and a ro (where 1 heqat = 320 ro), which will feature prominently throughout the rest of the papyrus. For the moment, however, their literal mention and usage in 35–38 is cosmetic.
39	100 bread loaves will be distributed unequally among 10 men. 50 loaves will be divided equally among 4 men so that each of those 4 receives an equal share $y$, while the other 50 loaves will be divided equally among the other 6 men so that each of those 6 receives an equal share $x$. Find the difference of these two shares $y - x$ and express same as an Egyptian fraction.	$y - x = 4 + \frac{1}{6}$	In problem 39, the papyrus begins to consider situations with more than one variable.
40	100 loaves of bread are to be divided among five men. The men's five shares of bread are to be in arithmetic progression, so that consecutive shares always differ by a fixed difference, or $\Delta$. Furthermore, the sum of the three largest shares is to be equal to seven times the sum of the two smallest shares. Find $\Delta$ and write it as an Egyptian fraction.	$\Delta = 9 + \frac{1}{6}$	Problem 40 concludes the arithmetic/algebraic section of the papyrus, to be followed by the geometry section. After problem 40, there is even a large section of blank space on the papyrus, which visually indicates the end of the section. As for problem 40 itself, Ahmes works out his solution by first considering the analogous case where the number of loaves is 60 as opposed to 100. He then states that in this case the difference is 5 1/2 and that the smallest share is equal to one, lists the others, and then scales his work back up to 100 to produce his result. Although Ahmes does not state the solution itself as it has been given here, the quantity is implicitly clear once he has re-scaled his first step by the multiplication 5/3 x 11/2, to list the five shares (which he does). It bears mentioning that this problem can be thought of as having four conditions: a) five shares sum to 100, b) the shares range from smallest to largest, c) consecutive shares have a constant difference and d) the sum of the three larger shares is equal to seven times the sum of the smaller two shares. Beginning with the first three conditions only, one can use elementary algebra and then consider whether adding the fourth condition yields a consistent result. It happens that once all four conditions are in place, the solution is unique. The problem is therefore a more elaborate case of linear equation solving than what has gone before, verging on linear algebra.
41	Use the volume formula $V = \bigg( d - \frac{1}{9} d \bigg)^{2} h$ $= \frac{64}{81} d^{2} h$ to calculate the volume of a cylindrical grain silo with a diameter of 9 cubits and a height of 10 cubits. Give the answer in terms of cubic cubits. Furthermore, given the following equalities among other units of volume, 1 cubic cubit = 3/2 khar = 30 heqats = 15/2 quadruple heqats, also express the answer in terms of khar and quadruple heqats.	$V = 640 \;\;\; cubit^{3}$ $= 960 \;\;\; khar$ $= 4800 \;\;\; quadruple \;\;\; heqat$	This problem opens up the papyrus's geometry section, and also gives its first factually incorrect result (albeit with a very good approximation of $\pi$, differing by less than one percent). Other ancient Egyptian volume units such as the quadruple heqat and the khar are later reported in this problem via unit conversion. Problem 41 is therefore also the first problem to treat significantly of dimensional analysis.
42	Reuse the volume formula and unit information given in 41 to calculate the volume of a cylindrical grain silo with a diameter of 10 cubits and a height of 10 cubits. Give the answer in terms of cubic cubits, khar, and hundreds of quadruple heqats, where 400 heqats = 100 quadruple heqats = 1 hundred-quadruple heqat, all as Egyptian fractions.	$V = \bigg( 790 + \frac{1}{18} + \frac{1}{27} + \frac{1}{54} + \frac{1}{81} \bigg) \;\;\; cubit^{3}$ $= \bigg( 1185 + \frac{1}{6} + \frac{1}{54} \bigg) \;\;\; khar$ $= \bigg( 59 + \frac{1}{4} + \frac{1}{108} \bigg) \;\;\; hundred \;\;\; quadruple \;\;\; heqat$	Problem 42 is effectively a repetition of 41, performing similar unit conversions at the end. However, although the problem does begin as stated, the arithmetic is considerably more involved, and certain of the given latter fractional terms are not actually present in the original document. However, the context is sufficient to fill in the gaps, and Chace has therefore taken license to add certain fractional terms in his mathematical translation (repeated here) which give rise to an internally consistent solution.
43	Use the volume formula $V = \frac{2}{3} \Bigg( \bigg( d - \frac{1}{9} d \bigg) + \frac{1}{3} \bigg( d - \frac{1}{9} d \bigg) \Bigg)^{2} h$ $= \frac{2048}{2187} d^{2} h$ to calculate the volume of a cylindrical grain silo with a diameter of 9 cubits and a height of 6 cubits, directly finding the answer in Egyptian fractional terms of khar, and later in Egyptian fractional terms of quadruple heqats and quadruple ro, where 1 quadruple heqat = 4 heqat = 1280 ro = 320 quadruple ro.	$V = \bigg( 455 + \frac{1}{9} \bigg) \;\;\; khar$ $= \bigg( 2275 + \frac{1}{2} + \frac{1}{32} + \frac{1}{64} \bigg) \;\;\; quadruple \;\;\; heqat$ $+ \bigg( 2 + \frac{1}{2} + \frac{1}{4} + \frac{1}{36} \bigg) \;\;\; quadruple \;\;\; ro$	Problem 43 represents the first serious mathematical mistake in the papyrus. Ahmes (or the source from which he may have been copying) attempted a shortcut in order to perform both the volume calculation and a unit conversion from cubic cubits to khar all in a single step, to avoid the need to use cubic cubits in an initial result. However, this attempt (which failed due to confusing part of the process used in 41 and 42 with that which was probably intended to be used in 43, giving consistent results by a different method) instead resulted in a new volume formula which is inconsistent with (and worse than) the approximation used in 41 and 42.
44, 45	One cubic cubit is equal to 15/2 quadruple heqats. Consider (44) a cubic grain silo with a length of 10 cubits on every edge. Express its volume $V$ in terms of quadruple heqats. On the other hand, (45) consider a cubic grain silo which has a volume of 7500 quadruple heqats, and express its edge length $l$ in terms of cubits.	$V = 7500 \;\;\; quadruple \;\; heqat$ $l = 10 \;\;\; cubit$	Problem 45 is an exact reversal of problem 44, and they are therefore presented together here.
46	A rectangular prism-grain silo has a volume of 2500 quadruple heqats. Describe its three dimensions $l_1, l_2, l_3$ in terms of cubits.	$l_1 = l_2 = 10 \;\;\; cubit$ $l_3 = 3 + \frac{1}{3} \;\;\; cubit$	This problem as stated has infinitely many solutions, but a simple choice of solution closely related to the terms of 44 and 45 is made.
47	Divide the physical volume quantity of 100 quadruple heqats by each of the multiples of 10, from 10 through 100. Express the results in Egyptian fractional terms of quadruple heqat and quadruple ro, and present the results in a table.	$$\begin{bmatrix} \frac{100}{10}  & q. \; heqat & = &   10                                                               & q. \; heqat \\ \frac{100}{20}  & q. \; heqat & = &   5                                                                & q. \; heqat \\ \frac{100}{30}  & q. \; heqat & = & ( 3  + \frac{1}{4}  + \frac{1}{16} + \frac{1}{64}                ) & q. \; heqat \\ &             & + & ( 1  + \frac{2}{3}                                               ) & q. \; ro    \\ \frac{100}{40}  & q. \; heqat & = & ( 2  + \frac{1}{2}                                               ) & q. \; heqat \\ \frac{100}{50}  & q. \; heqat & = &   2                                                                & q. \; heqat \\ \frac{100}{60}  & q. \; heqat & = & ( 1  + \frac{1}{2}  + \frac{1}{8}  + \frac{1}{32}                ) & q. \; heqat \\ &             & + & ( 3  + \frac{1}{3}                                               ) & q. \; ro    \\ \frac{100}{70}  & q. \; heqat & = & ( 1  + \frac{1}{4}  + \frac{1}{8}  + \frac{1}{32} + \frac{1}{64} ) & q. \; heqat \\ &             & + & ( 2  + \frac{1}{14} + \frac{1}{21} + \frac{1}{42}                ) & q. \; ro    \\ \frac{100}{80}  & q. \; heqat & = & ( 1  + \frac{1}{4}                                               ) & q. \; heqat \\ \frac{100}{90}  & q. \; heqat & = & ( 1  + \frac{1}{16} + \frac{1}{32} + \frac{1}{64}                ) & q. \; heqat \\ &             & + & (      \frac{1}{2}  + \frac{1}{18}                               ) & q. \; ro    \\ \frac{100}{100} & q. \; heqat & = &   1                                                                & q. \; heqat \\ \end{bmatrix}$$	In problem 47, Ahmes is particularly insistent on representing more elaborate strings of fractions as Horus eye fractions, as far as he can. Compare problems 64 and 80 for similar preference of representation. To conserve space, "quadruple" has been shortened to "q." in all cases.
48	Compare the area of a circle with diameter 9 to that of its circumscribing square, which also has a side length of 9. What is the ratio of the area of the circle to that of the square?	$\frac{64}{81}$	The statement and solution of problem 48 make explicitly clear this preferred method of approximating the area of a circle, which had been used earlier in problems 41–43. However, it is erroneous. The original statement of problem 48 involves the usage of a unit of area known as the setat, which will shortly be given further context in future problems. For the moment, it is cosmetic.
49	One khet is a unit of length, being equal to 100 cubits. Also, a "cubit strip" is a rectangular strip-measurement of area, being 1 cubit by 100 cubits, or 100 square cubits (or a physical quantity of equal area). Consider a rectangular plot of land measuring 10 khet by 1 khet. Express its area $A$ in terms of cubit strips.	$A = 1000 \;\;\; cubit \;\;\; strip$	-
50	One square khet is a unit of area equal to one setat. Consider a circle with a diameter of 9 khet. Express its area $A$ in terms of setat.	$A = 64 \;\;\; setat$	Problem 50 is effectively a reinforcement of 48's 64/81 rule for a circle's area, which pervades the papyrus.
51	A triangular tract of land has a base of 4 khet and an altitude of 10 khet. Find its area $A$ in terms of setat.	$A = 20 \;\;\; setat$	The setup and solution of 51 recall the familiar formula for calculating a triangle's area, and per Chace it is paraphrased as such. However, the papyrus's triangular diagram, previous mistakes, and translation issues present ambiguity over whether the triangle in question is a right triangle, or indeed if Ahmes actually understood the conditions under which the stated answer is correct. Specifically, it is unclear whether the dimension of 10 khet was meant as an altitude (in which case the problem is correctly worked as stated) or whether "10 khet" simply refers to a side of the triangle, in which case the figure would have to be a right triangle in order for the answer to be factually correct and properly worked, as done. These problems and confusions perpetuate themselves throughout 51–53, to the point where Ahmes seems to lose understanding of what he is doing, especially in 53.
52	A trapezoidal tract of land has two bases, being 6 khet and 4 khet. Its altitude is 20 khet. Find its area $A$ in terms of setat.	$A = 100 \;\;\; setat$	Problem 52's issues are much the same as those of 51. The method of solution is familiar to moderns, and yet circumstances like those in 51 cast doubt over how well Ahmes or his source understood what they were doing.
53	An isosceles triangle (a tract of land, say) has a base equal to 4 1/2 khet, and an altitude equal to 14 khet. Two line segments parallel to the base further partition the triangle into three sectors, being a bottom trapezoid, a middle trapezoid, and a top (similar) smaller triangle. The line segments cut the triangle's altitude at its midpoint (7) and further at a quarter-point (3 1/2) closer to the base, so that each trapezoid has an altitude of 3 1/2 khet, while the smaller similar triangle has an altitude of 7 khet. Find the lengths $l_{1} , l_{2}$ of the two line segments, where they are the shorter and the longer line segments respectively, and express them in Egyptian fractional terms of khet. Furthermore, find the areas $A_{1} , A_{2} , A_{3}$ of the three sectors, where they are the large trapezoid, the middle trapezoid, and the small triangle respectively, and express them in Egyptian fractional terms of setat and cubit strips. Use the fact that 1 setat = 100 cubit strips for unit conversions.	$l_{1} = \bigg( 2 + \frac{1}{4} \bigg) \;\;\; khet$ $l_{2} = \bigg( 3 + \frac{1}{4} + \frac{1}{8} \bigg) \;\;\; khet$ $A_{1} = \bigg( 13 + \frac{1}{2} + \frac{1}{4} \bigg) \;\;\; setat + \bigg( 3 + \frac{1}{8} \bigg) \;\;\; cubit \;\;\; strip$ $A_{2} = \bigg( 9 + \frac{1}{2} + \frac{1}{4} \bigg) \;\;\; setat + \bigg( 9 + \frac{1}{4} + \frac{1}{8} \bigg) \;\;\; cubit \;\;\; strip$ $A_{3} = \bigg( 7 + \frac{1}{2} + \frac{1}{4} + \frac{1}{8} \bigg) \;\;\; setat$	Problem 53, being more complex, is fraught with many of the same issues as 51 and 52—translation ambiguities and several numerical mistakes. In particular concerning the large bottom trapezoid, Ahmes seems to get stuck on finding the upper base, and proposes in the original work to subtract "one tenth, equal to 1 + 1/4 + 1/8 setat plus 10 cubit strips" from a rectangle being (presumably) 4 1/2 x 3 1/2 (khet). However, even Ahmes' answer here is inconsistent with the problem's other information. Happily the context of 51 and 52, together with the base, mid-line, and smaller triangle area (which are given as 4 + 1/2, 2 + 1/4 and 7 + 1/2 + 1/4 + 1/8, respectively) make it possible to interpret the problem and its solution as has been done here. The given paraphrase therefore represents a consistent best guess as to the problem's intent, which follows Chace. Ahmes also refers to the "cubit strips" again in the course of calculating for this problem, and we therefore repeat their usage here. It bears mentioning that neither Ahmes nor Chace explicitly give the area for the middle trapezoid in their treatments (Chace suggests that this is a triviality from Ahmes' point of view); liberty has therefore been taken to report it in a manner which is consistent with what Chace had thus far advanced.
54	There are 10 plots of land. In each plot, a sector is partitioned off such that the sum of the area of these 10 new partitions is 7 setat. Each new partition has equal area. Find the area $A$ of any one of these 10 new partitions, and express it in Egyptian fractional terms of setat and cubit strips.	$A = \bigg( \frac{1}{2} + \frac{1}{5} \bigg) \;\;\; setat$ $= \bigg( \frac{1}{2} + \frac{1}{8} \bigg) \;\;\; setat + \bigg( 7 + \frac{1}{2} \bigg) \;\;\; cubit \;\;\; strip$	-
55	There are 5 plots of land. In each plot, a sector is partitioned off such that the sum of the area of these 5 new partitions is 3 setat. Each new partition has equal area. Find the area $A$ of any one of these 5 new partitions, and express it in Egyptian fractional terms of setat and cubit strips.	$A = \bigg( \frac{1}{2} + \frac{1}{10} \bigg) \;\;\; setat$ $= \frac{1}{2} \;\;\; setat + 10 \;\;\; cubit \;\;\; strip$	-
56	1) The unit of length known as a royal cubit is (and has been, throughout the papyrus) what is meant when we simply refer to a cubit. One royal cubit, or one cubit, is equal to seven palms, and one palm is equal to four fingers. In other words, the following equalities hold: 1 (royal) cubit = 1 cubit = 7 palms = 28 fingers. 2) Consider a right regular square pyramid whose base, the square face is coplanar with a plane (or the ground, say), so that any of the planes containing its triangular faces has the dihedral angle of $\theta$ with respect to the ground-plane (that is, on the interior of the pyramid). In other words, $\theta$ is the angle of the triangular faces of the pyramid with respect to the ground. The seked of such a pyramid, then, having altitude $a$ and base edge length $b$, is defined as that physical length $S$ such that $\frac{S}{1 \;\;\; royal \;\;\;cubit} =$ $\cot{ \theta }$. Put another way, the seked of a pyramid can be interpreted as the ratio of its triangular faces' run per one unit (cubit) rise. Or, for the appropriate right triangle on a pyramid's interior having legs $a, \frac{b}{2}$ and the perpendicular bisector of a triangular face as the hypotenuse, then the pyramid's seked $S$ satisfies $\cot{ \theta } = \frac{b}{2a} = \frac{S}{1 \;\;\; royal \;\;\;cubit}$. Similar triangles are therefore described, and one can be scaled to the other. 3) A pyramid has an altitude of 250 (royal) cubits, and the side of its base has a length of 360 (royal) cubits. Find its seked $S$ in Egyptian fractional terms of (royal) cubits, and also in terms of palms.	$S = \bigg( \frac{1}{2} + \frac{1}{5} + \frac{1}{50} \bigg) \;\;\; cubit$ $= \bigg( 5 + \frac{1}{25} \bigg) \;\;\; palm$	Problem 56 is the first of the "pyramid problems" or seked problems in the Rhind papyrus, 56–59, 59B and 60, which concern the notion of a pyramid's facial inclination with respect to a flat ground. In this connection, the concept of a seked suggests early beginnings of trigonometry. Unlike modern trigonometry however, note especially that a seked is found with respect to some pyramid, and is itself a physical length measurement, which may be given in terms of any physical length units. For obvious reasons however, we (and the papyrus) confine our attention to situations involving ancient Egygtian units. We have also clarified that royal cubits are used throughout the papyrus, to differentiate them from "short" cubits which were used elsewhere in ancient Egypt. One "short" cubit is equal to six palms.
57, 58	The seked of a pyramid is 5 palms and 1 finger, and the side of its base is 140 cubits. Find (57) its altitude $a$ in terms of cubits. On the other hand, (58), a pyramid's altitude is 93 + 1/3 cubits, and the side of its base is 140 cubits. Find its seked $S$ and express it in terms of palms and fingers.	$a = \bigg( 93 + \frac{1}{3} \bigg) \;\;\; cubit$ $S = 5 \;\;\; palm + 1 \;\;\; finger$	Problem 58 is an exact reversal of problem 57, and they are therefore presented together here.
59, 59B	A pyramid's (59) altitude is 8 cubits, and its base length is 12 cubits. Express its seked $S$ in terms of palms and fingers. On the other hand, (59B), a pyramid's seked is five palms and one finger, and the side of its base is 12 cubits. Express its altitude $a$ in terms of cubits.	$S = 5 \;\;\; palm + 1 \;\;\; finger$ $a = 8 \;\;\; cubit$	Problems 59 and 59B consider a case similar to 57 and 58, ending with familiar results. As exact reversals of each other, they are presented together here.
60	If a "pillar" (that is, a cone) has an altitude of 30 cubits, and the side of its base (or diameter) has a length of 15 cubits, find its seked $S$ and express it in terms of cubits.	$S = \frac{1}{4} \;\;\; cubit$	Ahmes uses slightly different words to present this problem, which lend themselves to translation issues. However, the overall context of the problem, together with its accompanying diagram (which differs from the previous diagrams), leads Chace to conclude that a cone is meant. The notion of seked is easily generalized to the lateral face of a cone; he therefore reports the problem in these terms. Problem 60 concludes the geometry section of the papyrus. Moreover, it is the last problem on the recto (front side) of the document; all later content in this summary is present on the verso (back side) of the papyrus. The transition from 60 to 61 is thus both a thematic and physical shift in the papyrus.
61	Seventeen multiplications are to have their products expressed as Egyptian fractions. The whole is to be given as a table.	$$\begin{bmatrix} \frac{2}{3} \cdot \frac{2}{3}  = \frac{1}{3}  + \frac{1}{9}  & ; & \frac{1}{3}  \cdot \frac{2}{3}  = \frac{1}{6}  + \frac{1}{18} \\ \frac{2}{3} \cdot \frac{1}{3}  = \frac{1}{6}  + \frac{1}{18} & ; & \frac{2}{3}  \cdot \frac{1}{6}  = \frac{1}{12} + \frac{1}{36} \\ \frac{2}{3} \cdot \frac{1}{2}  = \frac{1}{3}                 & ; & \frac{1}{3}  \cdot \frac{1}{2}  = \frac{1}{6}                 \\ \frac{1}{6} \cdot \frac{1}{2}  = \frac{1}{12}                & ; & \frac{1}{12} \cdot \frac{1}{2}  = \frac{1}{24}                \\ \frac{1}{9} \cdot \frac{2}{3}  = \frac{1}{18} + \frac{1}{54} & ; & \frac{2}{3}  \cdot \frac{1}{9}  = \frac{1}{18} + \frac{1}{54} \\ \frac{1}{4} \cdot \frac{1}{5}  = \frac{1}{20}                & ; & \frac{2}{3}  \cdot \frac{1}{7}  = \frac{1}{14} + \frac{1}{42} \\ \frac{1}{2} \cdot \frac{1}{7}  = \frac{1}{14}                & ; & \frac{2}{3}  \cdot \frac{1}{11} = \frac{1}{22} + \frac{1}{66} \\ \frac{1}{3} \cdot \frac{1}{11} = \frac{1}{33}                & ; & \frac{1}{2}  \cdot \frac{1}{11} = \frac{1}{22}                \\ \frac{1}{4} \cdot \frac{1}{11} = \frac{1}{44}                &   &                                                               \\ \end{bmatrix}$$	The syntax of the original document and its repeated multiplications indicate a rudimentary understanding that multiplication is commutative.
61B	Give a general procedure for converting the product of 2/3 and the reciprocal of any (positive) odd number 2n+1 into an Egyptian fraction of two terms, e.g. $\frac{2}{3} \cdot \frac{1}{2n+1} = \frac{1}{p} + \frac{1}{q}$ with natural p and q. In other words, find p and q in terms of n.	$p = 2(2n+1)$ $q = 6(2n+1)$	Problem 61B, and the method of decomposition that it describes (and suggests) is closely related to the computation of the Rhind Mathematical Papyrus 2/n table. In particular, every case in the 2/n table involving a denominator which is a multiple of 3 can be said to follow the example of 61B. 61B's statement and solution are also suggestive of a generality which most of the rest of the papyrus's more concrete problems do not have. It therefore represents an early suggestion of both algebra and algorithms.
62	A bag of three precious metals, gold, silver and lead, has been purchased for 84 sha'ty, which is a monetary unit. All three substances weigh the same, and a deben is a unit of weight. 1 deben of gold costs 12 sha'ty, 1 deben of silver costs 6 sha'ty, and 1 deben of lead costs 3 sha'ty. Find the common weight $W$ of any of the three metals in the bag.	$W = 4 \;\;\; deben$	Problem 62 becomes a division problem entailing a little dimensional analysis. Its setup involving standard weights renders the problem straightforward.
63	700 loaves are to be divided unevenly among four men, in four unequal, weighted shares. The shares will be in the respective proportions $\frac{2}{3} : \frac{1}{2} : \frac{1}{3} : \frac{1}{4}$. Find each share.	$266 + \frac{2}{3}$ $200$ $133 + \frac{1}{3}$ $100$	-
64	Recall that the heqat is a unit of volume. Ten heqat of barley are to be distributed among ten men in an arithmetic progression, so that consecutive men's shares have a difference of 1/8 heqats. Find the ten shares and list them in descending order, in Egyptian fractional terms of heqat.	$\bigg( 1 + \frac{1}{2} + \frac{1}{16} \bigg) \; heqat$ $\bigg( 1 + \frac{1}{4} + \frac{1}{8} + \frac{1}{16} \bigg) \; heqat$ $\bigg( 1 + \frac{1}{4} + \frac{1}{16} \bigg) \; heqat$ $\bigg( 1 + \frac{1}{8} + \frac{1}{16} \bigg) \; heqat$ $\bigg( 1 + \frac{1}{16} \bigg) \; heqat$ $\bigg( \frac{1}{2} + \frac{1}{4} + \frac{1}{8} + \frac{1}{16} \bigg) \; heqat$ $\bigg( \frac{1}{2} + \frac{1}{4} + \frac{1}{16} \bigg) \; heqat$ $\bigg( \frac{1}{2} + \frac{1}{8} + \frac{1}{16} \bigg) \; heqat$ $\bigg( \frac{1}{2} + \frac{1}{16} \bigg) \; heqat$ $\bigg( \frac{1}{4} + \frac{1}{8} + \frac{1}{16} \bigg) \; heqat$	Problem 64 is a variant of 40, this time involving an even number of unknowns. For quick modern reference apart from Egyptian fractions, the shares range from 25/16 down through 7/16, where the numerator decreases by consecutive odd numbers. The terms are given as Horus eye fractions; compare problems 47 and 80 for more of this.
65	100 loaves of bread are to be unevenly divided among ten men. Seven of the men receive a single share, while the other three men, being a boatman, a foreman, and a door-keeper, each receive a double share. Express each of these two share amounts as Egyptian fractions.	$7 + \frac{2}{3} + \frac{1}{39}$ $15 + \frac{1}{3} + \frac{1}{26} + \frac{1}{78}$	-
66	Recall that the heqat is a unit of volume and that one heqat equals 320 ro. 10 heqat of fat are distributed to one person over the course of one year (365 days), in daily allowances of equal amount. Express the allowance $a$ as an Egyptian fraction in terms of heqat and ro.	$a = \frac{1}{64} \;\;\; heqat + \bigg( 3 + \frac{2}{3} + \frac{1}{10} + \frac{1}{2190} \bigg) \;\;\; ro$	Problem 66 in its original form explicitly states that one year is equal to 365 days, and repeatedly uses the number 365 for its calculations. It is therefore primary historical evidence of the ancient Egyptian understanding of the year.
67	A shepherd had a flock of animals, and had to give a portion of his flock to a lord as tribute. The shepherd was told to give two-thirds OF one-third of his original flock as tribute. The shepherd gave 70 animals. Find the size of the shepherd's original flock.	$315$	-
68	Four overseers are in charge of four crews of men, being 12, 8, 6 and 4 men, respectively. Each crewman works at a fungible rate, to produce a single work-product: production (picking, say) of grain. Working on some interval of time, these four gangs collectively produced 100 units, or 100 quadruple heqats of grain, where each crew's work-product will be given to each crew's overseer. Express each crew's output $O_{12} , O_{8} , O_{6} , O_{4}$ in terms of quadruple heqat.	$O_{12} = 40 \;\;\; quadruple \;\;\; heqat$ $O_{8} = 26 + \frac{2}{3} \;\;\; quadruple \;\;\; heqat$ $O_{6} = 20 \;\;\; quadruple \;\;\; heqat$ $O_{4} = 13 + \frac{1}{3} \;\;\; quadruple \;\;\; heqat$	-
69	1) Consider cooking and food preparation. Suppose that there is a standardized way of cooking, or a production process, which will take volume units, specifically heqats of raw food-material (in particular, some one raw food-material) and produce units of some one finished food product. The pefsu $P$ of the (one) finished food product with respect to the (one) raw food-material, then, is defined as the quantity of finished food product units $p$ yielded from exactly one heqat of raw food material. In other words, $P = \frac{ p \;\;\; finished \;\;\; unit}{1 \;\;\; heqat_{raw \;\;\; material} }$. 2) 3 + 1/2 heqats of meal produce 80 loaves of bread. Find the meal per loaf $m$ in heqats and ro, and find the pefsu $P$ of these loaves with respect to the meal. Express them as Egyptian fractions.	$m = \frac{1}{32} \;\;\; heqat + 4 \;\;\; ro$ $P = \bigg( 22 + \frac{2}{3} + \frac{1}{7} + \frac{1}{21} \bigg) \frac{loaf}{ heqat_{meal} }$	Problem 69 begins the "pefsu" problems, 69–78, in the context of food preparation. The notion of the pefsu assumes some standardized production process without accidents, waste, etc., and only concerns the relationship of one standardized finished food product to one particular raw material. That is, the pefsu is not immediately concerned with matters like production time, or (in any one given case) the relationship of other raw materials or equipment to the production process, etc. Still, the notion of the pefsu is another hint of abstraction in the papyrus, capable of being applied to any binary relationship between a food product (or finished good, for that matter) and a raw material. The concepts that the pefsu entails are thus typical of manufacturing.
70	(7 + 1/2 + 1/4 + 1/8) heqats of meal produce 100 loaves of bread. Find the meal per loaf $m$ in heqats and ro, and find the pefsu $P$ of these loaves with respect to the meal. Express them as Egyptian fractions.	$m = \bigg( \frac{1}{16} + \frac{1}{64} \bigg) \;\;\; heqat + \frac{1}{5} \;\;\; ro$ $P = \bigg( 12 + \frac{2}{3} + \frac{1}{42} + \frac{1}{126} \bigg) \frac{loaf}{ heqat_{meal} }$	-
71	1/2 heqats of besha, a raw material, produces exactly one full des-measure (glass) of beer. Suppose that there is a production process for diluted glasses of beer. 1/4 of the glass just described is poured out, and what has just been poured out is captured and re-used later. This glass, which is now 3/4 full, is then diluted back to capacity with water, producing exactly one full diluted glass of beer. Find the pefsu $P$ of these diluted beer glasses with respect to the besha as an Egyptian fraction.	$P = \bigg( 2 + \frac{2}{3} \bigg) \frac{des-measure}{ heqat_{besha} }$	Problem 71 describes intermediate steps in a production process, as well as a second raw material, water. These are irrelevant to the relationship between the finished unit and the raw material (besha in this case).
72	100 bread loaves "of pefsu 10" are to be evenly exchanged for $x$ loaves "of pefsu 45". Find $x$.	$x = 450$	Now that the concept of the pefsu has been established, problems 72–78 explore even exchanges of different heaps of finished foods, having different pefsu. In general however, they assume a common raw material of some kind. Specifically, the common raw material assumed throughout all of 72–78 is called wedyet flour, which is even implicated in the production of beer, so that beer can be exchanged for bread in the latter problems. 74's original statement also mentions "Upper Egyptian barley", but for our purposes this is cosmetic. What problems 72–78 say, then, is really this: equal amounts of raw material are used in two different production processes, to produce two different units of finished food, where each type has a different pefsu. One of the two finished food units is given. Find the other. This can be accomplished by dividing both units (known and unknown) by their respective pefsu, where the units of finished food vanish in dimensional analysis, and only the same raw material is considered. One can then easily solve for x. 72–78 therefore really require that x be given so that equal amounts of raw material are used in two different production processes.
73	100 bread loaves of pefsu 10 are to be evenly exchanged for $x$ loaves of pefsu 15. Find $x$.	$x = 150$	-
74	1000 bread loaves of pefsu 5 are to be divided evenly into two heaps of 500 loaves each. Each heap is to be evenly exchanged for two other heaps, one of $x$ loaves of pefsu 10, and the other of $y$ loaves of pefsu 20. Find $x$ and $y$.	$x = 1000$ $y = 2000$	-
75	155 bread loaves of pefsu 20 are to be evenly exchanged for $x$ loaves of pefsu 30. Find $x$.	$x = 232 + \frac{1}{2}$	-
76	1000 bread loaves of pefsu 10, one heap, will be evenly exchanged for two other heaps of loaves. The other two heaps each has an equal number of $x$ loaves, one being of pefsu 20, the other of pefsu 30. Find $x$.	$x = 1200$	-
77	10 des-measure of beer, of pefsu 2, are to be evenly exchanged for $x$ bread loaves, of pefsu 5. Find $x$.	$x = 25$	-
78	100 bread loaves of pefsu 10 are to be evenly exchanged for $x$ des-measures of beer of pefsu 2. Find $x$.	$x = 20$	-
79	An estate's inventory consists of 7 houses, 49 cats, 343 mice, 2401 spelt plants (a type of wheat), and 16,807 units of heqat (of whatever substance—a type of grain, suppose). List the items in the estates' inventory as a table, and include their total.	$$\begin{bmatrix} houses & 7     \\ cats   & 49    \\ mice   & 343   \\ spelt  & 2401  \\ heqat  & 16807 \\ Total  & 19607 \\ \end{bmatrix}$$	Problem 79 has been presented in its most literal interpretation. However, the problem is among the most interesting in the papyrus, as its setup and even method of solution suggests Geometric progression (that is, geometric sequences), elementary understanding of finite series, as well as the St. Ives problem—even Chace cannot help interrupting his own narrative in order to compare problem 79 with the St. Ives nursery rhyme. He also indicates that a suspiciously familiar third instance of these types of problems is to be found in Fibonacci's Liber Abaci. Chace suggests the interpretation that 79 is a kind of savings example, where a certain amount of grain is saved by keeping cats on hand to kill the mice which would otherwise eat the spelt used to make the grain. In the original document, the 2401 term is written as 2301 (an obvious mistake), while the other terms are given correctly; it is therefore corrected here. Moreover, one of Ahmes' methods of solution for the sum suggests an understanding of finite geometric series. Ahmes performs a direct sum, but he also presents a simple multiplication to get the same answer: "2801 x 7 = 19607". Chace explains that since the first term, the number of houses (7) is equal to the common ratio of multiplication (7), then the following holds (and can be generalized to any similar situation): $\sum\limits_{k=1}^{n} 7^{k} = 7 \bigg( 1 + \sum\limits_{k=1}^{n-1} 7^{k} \bigg)$ That is, when the first term of a geometric sequence is equal to the common ratio, partial sums of geometric sequences, or finite geometric series, can be reduced to multiplications involving the finite series having one less term, which does prove convenient in this case. In this instance then, Ahmes simply adds the first four terms of the sequence (7 + 49 + 343 + 2401 = 2800) to produce a partial sum, adds one (2801), and then simply multiplies by 7 to produce the correct answer.
80	The hinu is a further unit of volume such that one heqat equals ten hinu. Consider the situations where one has a Horus eye fraction of heqats, and express their conversions to hinu in a table.	$$\begin{bmatrix} 1            & heqat & = & 10                             & hinu \\ \frac{1}{2}  & heqat & = & 5                              & hinu \\ \frac{1}{4}  & heqat & = & ( 2 + \frac{1}{2} )            & hinu \\ \frac{1}{8}  & heqat & = & ( 1 + \frac{1}{4} )            & hinu \\ \frac{1}{16} & heqat & = & ( \frac{1}{2} + \frac{1}{8} )  & hinu \\ \frac{1}{32} & heqat & = & ( \frac{1}{4} + \frac{1}{16} ) & hinu \\ \frac{1}{64} & heqat & = & ( \frac{1}{8} + \frac{1}{32} ) & hinu \\ \end{bmatrix}$$	Compare problems 47 and 64 for other tabular information with repeated Horus eye fractions.
81	Perform "another reckoning of the hinu." That is, express an assortment of Egyptian fractions, many terms of which are also Horus eye fractions, in various terms of heqats, hinu, and ro.		Problem 81's main section is a much larger conversion table of assorted Egyptian fractions, which expands on the idea of problem 80—indeed, it represents one of the largest tabular forms in the entire papyrus. The first part of problem 81 is an exact repetition of the table in problem 80, without the first row which states that 1 heqat = 10 hinu; it is therefore not repeated here. The second part of problem 81, or its "body", is the large table which is given here. The attentive reader will notice two things: several rows repeat identical information, and several forms (but not all) given in both of the "heqat" areas on either side of the table are in fact identical. There are two points worth mentioning, to explain why the table looks the way that it does. For one thing, Ahmes does in fact exactly repeat certain groups of information in different areas of the table, and they are accordingly repeated here. On the other hand, Ahmes also starts out with certain "left-hand" heqat forms, and makes some mistakes in his early calculations. However, in many cases he corrects these mistakes later in his writing of the table, producing a consistent result. Since the present information is simply a re-creation of Chace's translation and interpretation of the papyrus, and since Chace elected to interpret and correct Ahmes' mistakes by substituting the later correct information in certain earlier rows, thereby fixing Ahmes' mistakes and also therefore repeating information in the course of translation, this method of interpretation explains the duplication of information in certain rows. As for the duplication of information in certain columns (1/4 heqat = ... = 1/4 heqat, etc.), this seems simply to have been a convention that Ahmes filled in while considering certain important Horus-eye fractional ratios from both the standpoint of the hinu, and also of the heqat (and their conversions). In short, the various repetitions of information are the result of choices made by Ahmes, his potential source document, and the editorial choices of Chace, in order to present a mathematically consistent translation of the larger table in problem 81.
82	Estimate in wedyet-flour, made into bread, the daily portion of feed for ten fattening geese. To do this, perform the following calculations, expressing the quantities in Egyptian fractional terms of hundreds of heqats, heqats and ro, except where specified otherwise: Begin with the statement that "10 fattening geese eat 2 + 1/2 heqats in one day". In other words, the daily rate of consumption (and initial condition) $i$ is equal to 2 + 1/2. Determine the number of heqats which 10 fattening geese eat in 10 days, and in 40 days. Call these quantities $t$ and $f$, respectively. Multiply the above latter quantity $f$ by 5/3 to express the amount of "spelt", or $s$, required to be ground up. Multiply $f$ by 2/3 to express the amount of "wheat", or $w$, required. Divide $w$ by 10 to express a "portion of wheat", or $p$, which is to be subtracted from $f$. Find $f - p = g$. This is the amount of "grain", (or wedyet flour, it would seem), which is required to make the feed for geese, presumably on the interval of 40 days (which would seem to contradict the original statement of the problem, somewhat). Finally, express $g$ again in terms of hundreds of double heqats, double heqats and double ro, where 1 hundred double heqat = 2 hundred heqat = 100 double heqat = 200 heqat = 32,000 double ro = 64,000 ro. Call this final quantity $g_{2}$.	$t = 25 \;\;\; heqat$ $f = 100 \;\;\; heqat$ $s = \bigg( 1 + \frac{1}{2} \bigg) hundred \;\;\; heqat$ $+ \bigg( 16 + \frac{1}{2} + \frac{1}{8} + \frac{1}{32} \bigg) \;\;\; heqat + \bigg( 3 + \frac{1}{3} \bigg) \;\;\; ro$ $w = \bigg( \frac{1}{3} + \frac{1}{4} \bigg) hundred \;\;\; heqat$ $+ \bigg( 8 + \frac{1}{4} + \frac{1}{16} + \frac{1}{64} \bigg) \;\;\; heqat + \bigg( 1 + \frac{2}{3} \bigg) \;\;\; ro$ $p = \bigg( 6 + \frac{1}{2} + \frac{1}{8} + \frac{1}{32} \bigg) \;\;\; heqat + \bigg( 3 + \frac{1}{3} \bigg) \;\;\; ro$ $g = \bigg( \frac{1}{2} + \frac{1}{4} \bigg) hundred \;\;\; heqat$ $+ \bigg( 18 + \frac{1}{4} + \frac{1}{16} + \frac{1}{64} \bigg) \;\;\; heqat + \bigg( 1 + \frac{2}{3} \bigg) \;\;\; ro$ $g_{2} = \bigg( \frac{1}{4} \bigg) hundred \;\;\; double \;\;\; heqat$ $+ \bigg( 21 + \frac{1}{2} + \frac{1}{8} + \frac{1}{32} \bigg) \;\;\; double \;\;\; heqat$ $+ \bigg( 3 + \frac{1}{3} \bigg) \;\;\; double \;\;\; ro$	Beginning with problem 82, the papyrus becomes increasingly difficult to interpret (owing to mistakes and missing information), to the point of unintelligibility. However, it is yet possible to make some sense of 82. Simply put, there seem to exist established rules, or good estimates, for fractions to be taken of this-or-that food material in a cooking or production process. Ahmes' 82 simply gives expression to some of these quantities, in what is after all declared in the original document to be an "estimate", its somewhat contradictory and confused language notwithstanding. In addition to their strangeness, problems 82, 82B, 83 and 84 are also notable for continuing the "food" train of thought of the recent pefsu problems, this time considering how to feed animals instead of people. Both 82 and 82B make use of the "hundred heqat" unit with regard to t and f; these conventions are cosmetic, and not repeated here. Licence is also taken throughout these last problems (per Chace) to fix numerical mistakes of the original document, to attempt to present a coherent paraphrase.
82B	Estimate the amount of feed for other geese. That is, consider a situation which is identical to problem 82, with the single exception that the initial condition, or daily rate of consumption, is exactly half as large. That is, let $i$ = 1 + 1/4. Find $t$, $f$ and especially $g_{2}$ by using elementary algebra to skip the intermediate steps.	$t = \bigg( 12 + \frac{1}{2} \bigg) \;\;\; heqat$ $f = 50 \;\;\; heqat$ $g_{2} = \bigg( 23 + \frac{1}{4} + \frac{1}{16} + \frac{1}{64} \bigg) \;\;\; double \;\;\; heqat$ $+ \bigg( 1 + \frac{2}{3} \bigg) \;\;\; double \;\;\; ro$	Problem 82B is presented in parallel with problem 82, and quickly considers the identical situation where the associated quantities are halved. In both cases, it appears that Ahmes' real goal is to find g_2. Now that he has a "procedure", he feels free to skip 82's onerous steps. One could simply observe that the division by two carries through the entire problem's work, so that g_2 is also exactly half as large as in problem 82. A slightly more thorough approach using elementary algebra would be to backtrack the relationships between the quantities in 82, make the essential observation that g = 14/15 x f, and then perform the unit conversions to transform g into g_2.
83	Estimate the feed for various kinds of birds. This is a "problem" with multiple components, which can be interpreted as a series of remarks: Suppose that four geese are cooped up, and their collective daily allowance of feed is equal to one hinu. Express one goose's daily allowance of feed $a_{1}$ in terms of heqats and ro. Suppose that the daily feed for a goose "that goes into the pond" is equal to 1/16 + 1/32 heqats + 2 ro. Express this same daily allowance $a_{2}$ in terms of hinu. Suppose that the daily allowance of feed for 10 geese is one heqat. Find the 10-day allowance $a_{10}$ and the 30-day, or one-month allowance $a_{30}$ for the same group of animals, in heqats. Finally a table will be presented, giving daily feed portions to fatten one animal of any of the indicated species.	$a_{1} = \frac{1}{64} \;\;\; heqat + 3 \;\;\; ro$ $a_{2} = 1 \;\;\; hinu$ $a_{10} = 10 \;\;\; heqat$ $a_{30} = 30 \;\;\; heqat$ $$\begin{bmatrix} goose      & ( \frac{1}{8}  + \frac{1}{32} ) & heqat & + & ( 3 + \frac{1}{3} ) & ro \\ terp-goose & ( \frac{1}{8}  + \frac{1}{32} ) & heqat & + & ( 3 + \frac{1}{3} ) & ro \\ crane      & ( \frac{1}{8}  + \frac{1}{32} ) & heqat & + & ( 3 + \frac{1}{3} ) & ro \\ set-duck   & ( \frac{1}{32} + \frac{1}{64} ) & heqat & + &   1                 & ro \\ ser-goose  &   \frac{1}{64}                  & heqat & + &   3                 & ro \\ dove       &                                 &       &   &   3                 & ro \\ quail      &                                 &       &   &   3                 & ro \\ \end{bmatrix}$$	Since problem 83's various items are concerned with unit conversions between heqats, ro and hinu, in the spirit of 80 and 81, it is natural to wonder what the table's items become when converted to hinu. The portion shared by the goose, terp-goose and crane is equal to 5/3 hinu, the set-ducks' portion is equal to 1/2 hinu, the ser-gooses' portion is equal to 1/4 hinu (compare the first item in the problem), and the portion shared by the dove and quail is equal to 1/16 + 1/32 hinu. The presence of various Horus eye fractions is familiar from the rest of the papyrus, and the table seems to consider feed estimates for birds, ranging from largest to smallest. The "5/3 hinu" portions at the top of the table, specifically its factor of 5/3, reminds one of the method for finding s in problem 82. Problem 83 makes mention of "Lower-Egyptian grain", or barley, and it also uses the "hundred-heqat" unit in one place; these are cosmetic, and left out of the present statement.
84	Estimate the feed for a stable of oxen.	$$\begin{bmatrix} & Loaves                                        & Common \; food                               \\ 4 \; fine \; oxen & 24 \; heqat                                   & 2 \; heqat                                   \\ 2 \; fine \; oxen & 22 \; heqat                                   & 6 \; heqat                                   \\ 3 \; cattle       & 20 \; heqat                                   & 2 \; heqat                                   \\ 1 \; ox           & 20 \; heqat                                   &                                              \\ Total             & 86 \; heqat                                   & 10 \; heqat                                  \\ in \; spelt       & 9  \; heqat                                   & ( 7 + \frac{1}{2} ) \; heqat                 \\ 10 \; days        & ( \frac{1}{2} + \frac{1}{4} ) \; c. \; heqat  & ( \frac{1}{2} + \frac{1}{4} ) \; c. \; heqat \\ & + 15 \; heqat                                 &                                              \\ one \; month      & 200 \; heqat                                  & ( \frac{1}{2} + \frac{1}{4} ) \; c. \; heqat \\ &                                               & + 15 \; heqat                                \\ double \; heqat   & \frac{1}{2} \; c. \; heqat                    & \frac{1}{4} \; c. \; heqat                   \\ & + ( 11 + \frac{1}{2} + \frac{1}{8} ) \; heqat & + 5 \; heqat                                 \\ & + 3 \; ro                                     &                                              \\ \end{bmatrix}$$	84 is the last problem, or number, comprising the mathematical content of the Rhind papyrus. With regard to 84 itself, Chace echoes Peet: "One can only agree with Peet that 'with this problem the papyrus reaches its limit of unintelligibility and inaccuracy.'"(Chace, V.2, Problem 84). Here, instances of the "hundred heqat" unit have been expressed by "c. heqat" in order to conserve space. The three "cattle" mentioned are described as "common" cattle, to differentiate them from the other animals, and the two headers concerning loaves and "common food" are with respect to heqats. The "fine oxen" at the table's beginning are described as Upper Egyptian oxen, a phrase also removed here for space reasons. Problem 84 seems to suggest a procedure to estimate various food materials and allowances in similar terms as the previous three problems, but the extant information is deeply confused. Still, there are hints of consistency. The problem seems to start out like a conventional story problem, describing a stable with ten animals of four different types. It seems that the four types of animals consume feed, or "loaves" at different rates, and that there are corresponding amounts of "common" food. These two columns of information are correctly summed in the "total" row, however they are followed by two "spelt" items of dubious relationship to the above. These two spelt items are indeed each multiplied by ten to give the two entries in the "10 days" row, once unit conversions are accounted for. The "one month" row items do not seem to be consistent with the previous two, however. Finally, information in "double heqats" (read hundred double heqats, double heqats and double ro for these items) concludes the problem, in a manner reminiscent of 82 and 82B. The two items in the final row are in roughly, but not exactly, the same proportion to one another as the two items in the "one month" row.
Number 85	A small group of cursive hieroglyphic signs is written, which Chace suggests may represent the scribe "trying his pen." It appears to be a phrase or sentence of some kind, and two translations are suggested: 1) "Kill vermin, mice, fresh weeds, numerous spiders. Pray the god Re for warmth, wind and high water." 2) "Interpret this strange matter, which the scribe wrote ... according to what he knew."		The remaining items 85, 86 and 87, being various errata that are not mathematical in nature, are therefore styled by Chace as "numbers" as opposed to problems. They are also located on areas of the papyrus that are well away from the body of the writing, which had just ended with Problem 84. Number 85, for example, is some distance away from Problem 84 on the verso—but not too far away. Its placement on the papyrus therefore suggests a kind of coda, in which case the latter translation, which Chace describes as an example of the "enigmatic writing" interpretation of ancient Egyptian documents, seems most appropriate to its context in the document.
Number 86	Number 86 seems to be from some account, or memorandum, and lists an assortment of goods and quantities, using words familiar from the context of the rest of the papyrus itself. [The original text is a series of lines of writing, which are therefore numbered in the following.]	"1... living forever. List of the food in Hebenti... 2... his brother the steward Ka-mose... 3... of his year, silver, 50 pieces twice in the year... 4... cattle 2, in silver 3 pieces in the year... 5... one twice; that is, 1/6 and 1/6. Now as for one... 6... 12 hinu; that is, silver, 1/4 piece; one... 7... (gold or silver) 5 pieces, their price therefor; fish, 120, twice... 8... year, barley, in quadruple heqat, 1/2 + 1/4 of 100 heqat 15 heqat; spelt, 100 heqat... heqat... 9... barley, in quadruple heqat, 1/2 + 1/4 of 100 heqat 15 heqat; spelt, 1 + 1/2 + 1/4 times 100 heqat 17 heqat... 10... 146 + 1/2; barley, 1 + 1/2 + 1/4 times 100 heqat 10 heqat; spelt, 300 heqat... heqat... 11... 1/2, there was brought wine, 1 ass(load?)... 12... silver 1/2 piece; ... 4; that is, in silver... 13... 1 + 1/4; fat, 36 hinu; that is, in silver... 14... 1 + 1/2 + 1/4 times 100 heqat 21 heqat; spelt, in quadruple heqat, 400 heqat 10 heqat... 15-18 (These lines are repetitions of line 14.)"	Chace indicates that number 86 was pasted onto the far left side of the verso (opposite the later geometry problems on the recto), to strengthen the papyrus. Number 86 can therefore be interpreted as a piece of "scrap paper".
Number 87	Number 87 is a brief account of certain events. Chace indicates an (admittedly now dated and possibly changed) scholarly consensus that 87 was added to the papyrus not long after the completion of its mathematical content. He goes on to indicate that the events described in it "took place during the period of the Hyksos domination."	"Year 11, second month of the harvest season. Heliopolis was entered. The first month of the inundation season, 23rd day, "he of the South" attacked Tjaru. 25th day, it was heard that Tjaru was entered. Year 11, first month of the inundation season, third day. Birth of Set; the majesty of this god caused his voice to be heard. Birth of Isis, the heavens rained."	Number 87 is located toward the middle of the verso, surrounded by a large, blank, unused space.

== See also ==
- List of ancient Egyptian papyri
- Akhmim wooden tablet
- Ancient Egyptian units of measurement
- As I was going to St. Ives
- Berlin Papyrus 6619
- History of mathematics
- Lahun Mathematical Papyri

== Bibliography ==
- Chace, Arnold Buffum; et al. (1927). The Rhind Mathematical Papyrus. Vol. 1. Oberlin, Ohio: Mathematical Association of America – via Internet Archive.
- Chace, Arnold Buffum; et al. (1929). The Rhind Mathematical Papyrus. Vol. 2. Oberlin, Ohio: Mathematical Association of America – via Internet Archive.
- Gillings, Richard J. (1972). Mathematics in the Time of the Pharaohs (Dover reprint ed.). MIT Press. ISBN 0-486-24315-X.
- Robins, Gay; Shute, Charles (1987). The Rhind Mathematical Papyrus: an Ancient Egyptian Text. London: British Museum Publications Limited. ISBN 0-7141-0944-4.

Preceded by 16: Flood tablet	A History of the World in 100 Objects; Object 17	Succeeded by 18: Minoan Bull-leaper
