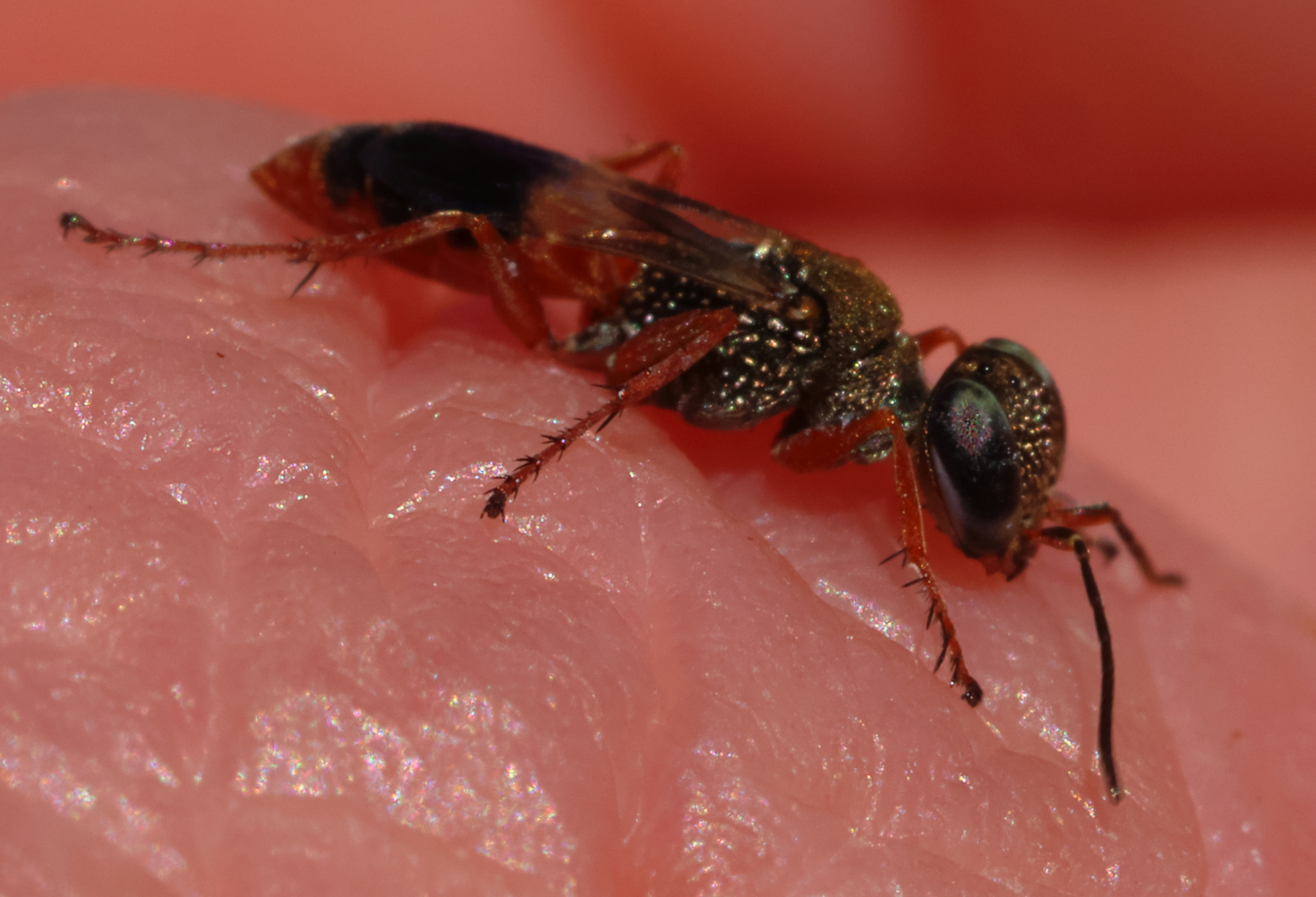
- Miscophus kriechbaumeri

Scientific classification
- Kingdom: Animalia
- Phylum: Arthropoda
- Clade: Pancrustacea
- Class: Insecta
- Order: Hymenoptera
- Family: Crabronidae
- Tribe: Miscophini
- Genus: Miscophus; Jurine, 1807

Diversity
- at least 180 species

Synonyms
- Hypomiscophus Cockerell, 1898; Miscophinus Ashmead, 1898; Nitelopterus Ashmead, 1897

= Miscophus =

Genus of wasps

Miscophus is a genus of square-headed wasps in the family Crabronidae. There are more than 180 described species in Miscophus.

== See also ==
- List of Miscophus species
