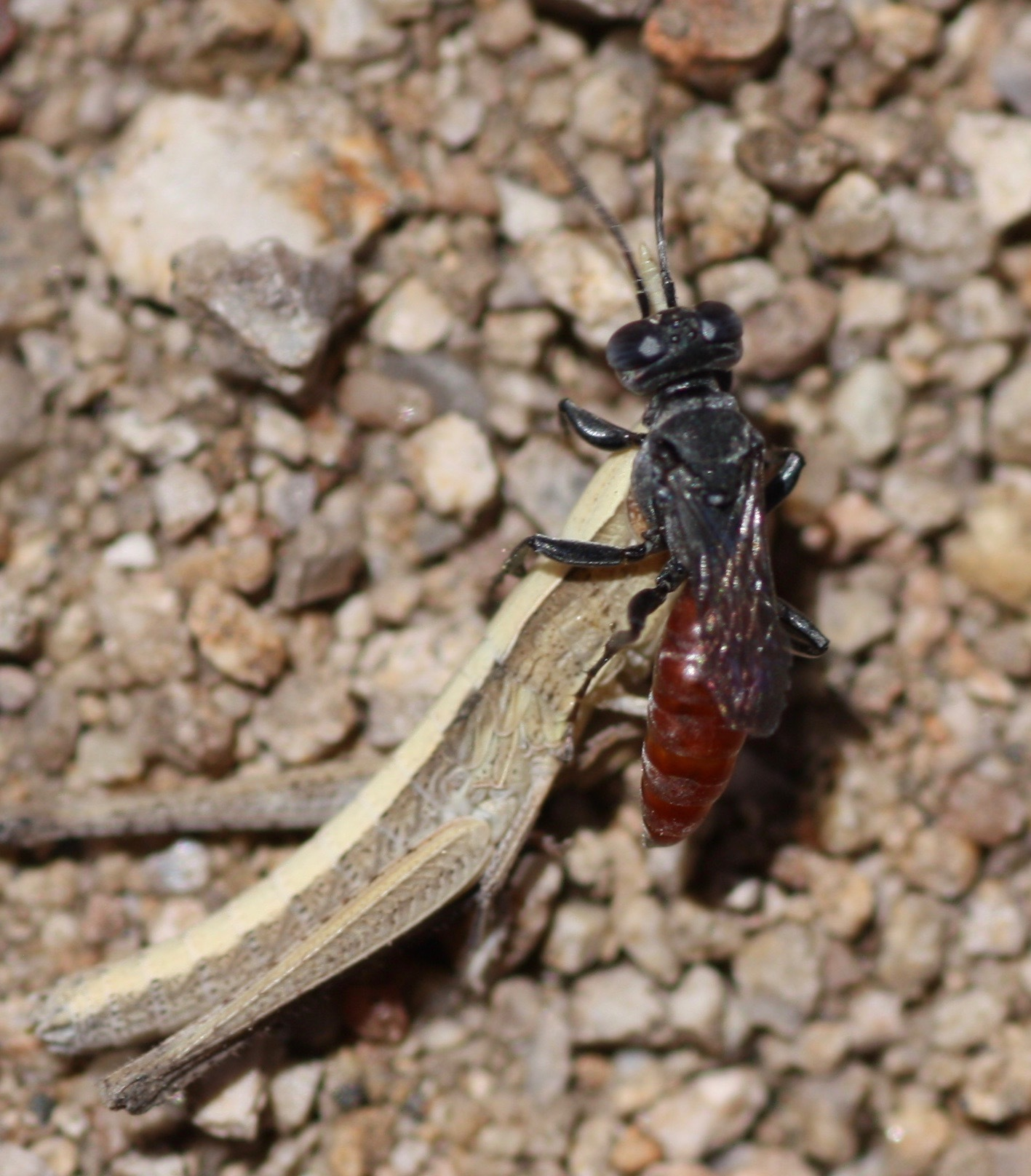
- Solierella sp.

Scientific classification
- Domain: Eukaryota
- Kingdom: Animalia
- Phylum: Arthropoda
- Class: Insecta
- Order: Hymenoptera
- Family: Crabronidae
- Subfamily: Crabroninae
- Tribe: Miscophini; W. Fox, 1894

= Miscophini =

Tribe of wasps

Miscophini is a tribe of square-headed wasps in the family Crabronidae. There are about 17 genera and at least 570 described species in Miscophini.

== Genera ==
These 17 genera belong to the tribe Miscophini:

- Aha Menke, 1977
- Auchenophorus R. Turner, 1907
- Larrissa Pulawski, 2012
- Larrisson Menke, 1967
- Lyroda Say, 1837
- Miscophoidellus Menke in Bohart and Menke, 1976
- Miscophoides Brauns in Kohl, 1897
- Miscophus Jurine, 1807
- Namiscophus Lomholdt, 1985
- Nitela Latreille, 1809
- Paranysson Guérin-Méneville, 1844
- Plenoculus W. Fox, 1893
- Saliostethoides Arnold, 1924
- Saliostethus Brauns in Kohl, 1897
- Sericophorus F. Smith, 1851
- Solierella Spinola, 1851
- Sphodrotes Kohl, 1889
